= 1995 Abierto Mexicano Telcel – Doubles =

Doubles
- 1995 Abierto Mexicano Telcel

Final
- Champions: (Argentina) Javier Frana (Mexico) Leonardo Lavalle
- Runners-up: (Germany) Marc-Kevin Goellner (Italy) Diego Nargiso
- Score: 7–5, 6–3

Details
- Draw: 16
- Seeds: 4

Events
Singles	Doubles
- Mexican Open

Francisco Montana and Bryan Shelton were the defending champions, but lost in the quarterfinals to Javier Frana and Leonardo Lavalle.

Frana and Lavalle won the title by defeating Marc-Kevin Goellner and Diego Nargiso 7–5, 6–3 in the final.

== Seeds ==
1. (Germany) Marc-Kevin Goellner / (Italy) Diego Nargiso (final)
2. (United States) Francisco Montana / (United States) Bryan Shelton (quarterfinals)
3. (Venezuela) Nicolás Pereira / (Czech Republic) David Rikl (semifinals)
4. (United States) Donald Johnson / (United States) Jack Waite (first round)

== Draw ==
Key

- Q = Qualifier
- WC = Wild card
- LL = Lucky loser
- Alt = Alternate
- ITF = ITF entry
- PR = Protected ranking
- SR = Special ranking
- SE = Special exempt
- JE = Junior exempt
- JR = Junior Accelerator Programme entrant
- CO = College Accelerator Programme entrant
- NG = Next Gen Accelerator Program entrant
- w/o = Walkover
- r = Retired
- d = Defaulted

=== Draw ===
First round
1	(Germany) MK Goellner (Italy) D Nargiso	6	6
WC	(Mexico) A Moreno (Peru) J Yzaga	3	2
(Spain) J Arrese (Spain) JA Conde	6	2	6
(United States) I Baron (Germany) M Zumpft	4	6	4
4	(United States) D Johnson (United States) J Waite	6	5	6
(United Kingdom) M Petchey (United States) K Thorne	4	7	7
(Spain) J Burillo (Argentina) H Gumy	4	6	3
WC	(Mexico) J Lozano (Mexico) R Ramírez	6	3	6
WC	(Mexico) L Herrera (Mexico) Ó Ortiz	7	0	4
(Spain) F Clavet (Spain) À Corretja	6	6	6
Q	(Mexico) R Herrera (Mexico) M Pacheco	6	1
3	(Venezuela) N Pereira (Czech Republic) D Rikl	7	6
(Argentina) J Frana (Mexico) L Lavalle	6	6	6
(United States) S Cannon (Kenya) P Wekesa	7	2	4
(Ecuador) P Campana (Colombia) M Rincón	6	5	6
2	(United States) F Montana (United States) B Shelton	3	7	7

Quarterfinals
1	(Germany) MK Goellner (Italy) D Nargiso	4	6	6
(Spain) J Arrese (Spain) JA Conde	6	2	1
(United Kingdom) M Petchey (United States) K Thorne	6	6
WC	(Mexico) J Lozano (Mexico) R Ramírez	3	4
(Spain) F Clavet (Spain) À Corretja	1	6
3	(Venezuela) N Pereira (Czech Republic) D Rikl	6	7
(Argentina) J Frana (Mexico) L Lavalle	2	6	6
2	(United States) F Montana (United States) B Shelton	6	2	1

Semifinals
1	(Germany) MK Goellner (Italy) D Nargiso	7	7
(United Kingdom) M Petchey (United States) K Thorne	6	5
3	(Venezuela) N Pereira (Czech Republic) D Rikl	4	4
(Argentina) J Frana (Mexico) L Lavalle	6	6

Final
1	(Germany) MK Goellner (Italy) D Nargiso	5	3
(Argentina) J Frana (Mexico) L Lavalle	7	6
