= 1997 Abierto Mexicano de Tenis =

- Date: 20–26 October
- Edition: 5th
- Category: World Series
- Draw: 32S / 16D
- Prize money: $305,000
- Surface: Clay / outdoor
- Location: Mexico City, Mexico]

Champions

Singles
- (Spain) Francisco Clavet

Doubles
- (Ecuador) Nicolás Lapentti / (Argentina) Daniel Orsanic
← 1996 ·	Abierto Mexicano de Tenis	· 1998 →

The 1997 Abierto Mexicano de Tenis, also known by its sponsored name Abierto Mexicano Telcel, was a men's tennis tournament played on outdoor clay courts in Mexico City, Mexico and was part of the World Series of the 1997 ATP Tour. It was the fifth edition of the tournament and took place from 20 October through 26 October 1997. First-seeded Francisco Clavet won the singles title.

== Finals ==
=== Singles ===
(Spain) Francisco Clavet defeated (Spain) Juan Albert Viloca 6–4, 7–6^{(9–7)}

- It was Clavet's 1st singles title of the year and the 4th of his career.

=== Doubles ===
(Ecuador) Nicolás Lapentti / (Argentina) Daniel Orsanic defeated (Mexico) Luis Herrera / (Mexico) Mariano Sánchez 4–6, 6–3, 7–6
