= 1997 Abierto Mexicano de Tenis – Doubles =

Doubles
- 1997 Abierto Mexicano de Tenis

Final
- Champions: (Ecuador) Nicolás Lapentti (Argentina) Daniel Orsanic
- Runners-up: (Mexico) Luis Herrera (Mexico) Mariano Sánchez
- Score: 4–6, 6–3, 7–6

Details
- Draw: 16 (1Q/2WC)
- Seeds: 4

Events
Singles	Doubles
← 1996 ·	Mexican Open	· 1998 →

Donald Johnson and Francisco Montana were the defending champions, but decided to compete in Stuttgart at the same week

Nicolás Lapentti and Daniel Orsanic won the title by defeating Luis Herrera and Mariano Sánchez 4–6, 6–3, 7–6 in the final.

== Seeds ==
1. (Argentina) Luis Lobo / (Spain) Javier Sánchez (first round)
2. (United States) Luke Jensen / (United States) Murphy Jensen (semifinals)
3. (Ecuador) Nicolás Lapentti / (Argentina) Daniel Orsanic (champions)
4. (Netherlands) Hendrik Jan Davids / (Australia) Andrew Kratzmann (first round)

== Draw ==
=== Key ===
- Q = Qualifier
- WC = Wild card
- LL = Lucky loser
- Alt = Alternate
- SE = Special exempt
- PR = Protected ranking
- ITF = ITF entry
- JE = Junior exempt
- w/o = Walkover
- r = Retired
- d = Defaulted
- SR = Special ranking

=== Draw ===
First round
1	(Argentina) L Lobo (Spain) J Sánchez	7	6	6
(United States) B Coupe (South Africa) P Rosner	5	7	7
(Mexico) D Roditi (Czech Republic) T Anzari	2	6	4
(United States) K Kinnear (United States) G Van Emburgh	6	1	6
4	(Netherlands) HJ Davids (Australia) A Kratzmann	2	4
(Spain) J Burillo (Spain) A Martín	6	6
Q	(Argentina) M Hood (Argentina) S Prieto	3	7	4
WC	(Mexico) L Herrera (Mexico) M Sánchez	6	6	6
(United States) B MacPhie (Netherlands) T Nijssen	4	6	7
(Mexico) B Martínez (Mexico) M Osorio	6	3	6
(Brazil) F Meligeni (Brazil) A Sá	5	6
3	(Ecuador) N Lapentti (Argentina) D Orsanic	7	7
WC	(Mexico) A Hernández (Mexico) Ó Ortiz	3	6	2
(Argentina) L Arnold Ker (United States) D Bowen	6	1	6
(United States) M Keil (United States) TJ Middleton	3	4
2	(United States) L Jensen (United States) M Jensen	6	6

Quarterfinals
(United States) B Coupe (South Africa) P Rosner	7	6
(United States) K Kinnear (United States) G Van Emburgh	6	4
(Spain) J Burillo (Spain) A Martín	4	4
WC	(Mexico) L Herrera (Mexico) M Sánchez	6	6
(United States) B MacPhie (Netherlands) T Nijssen	7	4	3
3	(Ecuador) N Lapentti (Argentina) D Orsanic	6	6	6
(Argentina) L Arnold Ker (United States) D Bowen	4	3
2	(United States) L Jensen (United States) M Jensen	6	6

Semifinals
(United States) B Coupe (South Africa) P Rosner	6	2	3
WC	(Mexico) L Herrera (Mexico) M Sánchez	1	6	6
3	(Ecuador) N Lapentti (Argentina) D Orsanic	6	7
2	(United States) L Jensen (United States) M Jensen	0	6

Final
WC	(Mexico) L Herrera (Mexico) M Sánchez	6	3	6
3	(Ecuador) N Lapentti (Argentina) D Orsanic	4	6	7
