= 1998 Abierto Mexicano Telcel – Doubles =

Doubles
- 1998 Abierto Mexicano Telcel

Final
- Champions: (Czech Republic) Jiří Novák (Czech Republic) David Rikl
- Runners-up: (Argentina) Daniel Orsanic (Mexico) David Roditi
- Score: 6–4, 6–2

Events
Singles	Doubles
← 1997 ·	Abierto Mexicano Telcel	· 1999 →

The 1998 Abierto Mexicano Telcel was a men's tennis tournament played on Clay in Mexico City, Mexico that was part of the International Series of the 1998 ATP Tour. It was the sixth edition of the tournament and was held from 26 October – 1 November.

== Seeds ==
Champion seeds are indicated in bold text while text in italics indicates the round in which those seeds were eliminated.

1. (Argentina) Daniel Orsanic / (Mexico) David Roditi (final)
2. (Czech Republic) **Jiří Novák** / (Czech Republic) **David Rikl (champions)**
3. (Spain) Julián Alonso / (Ecuador) Nicolás Lapentti (first round)
4. (Argentina) Mariano Hood / (Argentina) Sebastián Prieto (first round)

== Draw ==
=== Key ===
- Q = Qualifier
- WC = Wild card
- LL = Lucky loser
- Alt = Alternate
- SE = Special exempt
- PR = Protected ranking
- ITF = ITF entry
- JE = Junior exempt
- w/o = Walkover
- r = Retired
- d = Defaulted
- SR = Special ranking

=== Finals ===
First round
1	(Argentina) **D Orsanic** **(Mexico) D Roditi**	**6**	**6**
(Spain) J Balcells (Hungary) G Köves	4	4
(South Africa) **B Haygarth** **(United States) TJ Middleton**	**6**	4	**6**
(South Africa) L Bale (United Kingdom) D Sapsford	1	**6**	3
(Slovakia) **D Hrbatý** **(Armenia) S Sargsian**	**7**	**6**
3	(Spain) J Alonso (Ecuador) N Lapentti	5	3
(Argentina) **L Arnold** **(Argentina) M Puerta**	**6**	**6**
(Mexico) B Martínez (Mexico) M Osorio	3	2
(Mexico) **L Lavalle** **(Mexico) M Sánchez**	**7**	**6**
(Italy) M Bertolini (United States) D Bowen	6	3
(Brazil) **G Kuerten** **(Brazil) F Meligeni**	**6**	4	**6**
4	(Argentina) M Hood (Argentina) S Prieto	4	**6**	4
(United States) **J Courier** **(Mexico) L Herrera**	**6**	6	**6**
(United States) B Coupe (South Africa) P Rosner	3	**7**	3
2	(Czech Republic) **J Novák** **(Czech Republic) D Rikl**	**6**	**6**
(United States) D Flach (United States) G Van Emburgh	1	3

Quarterfinals
1	(Argentina) **D Orsanic** **(Mexico) D Roditi**	5	**6**	**6**
(South Africa) B Haygarth (United States) TJ Middleton	**7**	1	4
(Slovakia) D Hrbatý (Armenia) S Sargsian	6	6
(Argentina) **L Arnold** **(Argentina) M Puerta**	**7**	**7**
(Mexico) **L Lavalle** **(Mexico) M Sánchez**	4	**6**	**7**
(Brazil) G Kuerten (Brazil) F Meligeni	**6**	3	6
(United States) J Courier (Mexico) L Herrera	4	4
2	(Czech Republic) **J Novák** **(Czech Republic) D Rikl**	**6**	**6**

Semifinals
1	(Argentina) **D Orsanic** **(Mexico) D Roditi**	**6**	**6**
(Argentina) L Arnold (Argentina) M Puerta	0	1
(Mexico) L Lavalle (Mexico) M Sánchez	**6**	3	2
2	(Czech Republic) **J Novák** **(Czech Republic) D Rikl**	3	**6**	**6**

Final
1	(Argentina) D Orsanic (Mexico) D Roditi	4	2
2	(Czech Republic) **J Novák** **(Czech Republic) D Rikl**	**6**	**6**
