= 1997 Monte Carlo Open =

- Date: 21 – 27 April
- Edition: 91st
- Category: ATP Super 9
- Draw: 56S / 28D
- Prize money: $2,050,000
- Surface: Clay / outdoor
- Location: Roquebrune-Cap-Martin, France
- Venue: Monte Carlo Country Club

Champions

Singles
- (Chile) Marcelo Ríos

Doubles
- (United States) Donald Johnson / (United States) Francisco Montana
← 1996 ·	Monte Carlo Open	· 1998 →

The 1997 Monte Carlo Open was a men's tennis tournament played on outdoor clay courts. It was the 91st edition of the Monte Carlo Open, and was part of the ATP Super 9 of the 1997 ATP Tour. It took place at the Monte Carlo Country Club in Roquebrune-Cap-Martin, France, near Monte Carlo, Monaco, from 21 April through 27 April 1997.

Seventh-seeded Marcelo Ríos won the singles title.

== Finals ==
=== Singles ===
(Chile) Marcelo Ríos defeated (Spain) Àlex Corretja, 6–4, 6–3, 6–3

- It was Ríos' 1st singles title of the year, and his 5th overall. It was his 1st Masters title of the year, and overall.

=== Doubles ===
(United States) Donald Johnson / (United States) Francisco Montana defeated (Netherlands) Jacco Eltingh / (Netherlands) Paul Haarhuis, 7–6, 2–6, 7–6
