= 1996 Abierto Mexicano de Tenis – Doubles =

Doubles
- 1996 Abierto Mexicano de Tenis

Final
- Champions: (United States) Donald Johnson (United States) Francisco Montana
- Runners-up: (Venezuela) Nicolás Pereira (Spain) Emilio Sánchez
- Score: 6–2, 6–4

Details
- Draw: 16
- Seeds: 4

Events
Singles	Doubles
← 1995 ·	Abierto Mexicano de Tenis	· 1997 →

Javier Frana and Leonardo Lavalle were the defending champions but lost in the first round to Luis Lobo and Javier Sánchez.

Donald Johnson and Francisco Montana won in the final 6–2, 6–4 against Nicolás Pereira and Emilio Sánchez.

== Seeds ==
1. (Argentina) Luis Lobo / (Spain) Javier Sánchez (quarterfinals)
2. (Venezuela) Nicolás Pereira / (Spain) Emilio Sánchez (final)
3. (Czech Republic) Karel Nováček / (Czech Republic) Jiří Novák (quarterfinals)
4. (Spain) Jose Antonio Conde / (Portugal) Nuno Marques (first round)

== Draw ==
=== Key ===
- Q = Qualifier
- WC = Wild card
- LL = Lucky loser
- Alt = Alternate
- SE = Special exempt
- PR = Protected ranking
- ITF = ITF entry
- JE = Junior exempt
- w/o = Walkover
- r = Retired
- d = Defaulted
- SR = Special ranking

First round
1	(Argentina) L Lobo (Spain) J Sánchez	7	7
(Argentina) J Frana (Mexico) L Lavalle	6	6
(United States) D Johnson (United States) F Montana	6	6
(Sweden) R Bergh (Sweden) D Ekerot	1	2
4	(Spain) J A Conde (Portugal) N Marques	6	4	6
WC	(Mexico) A Hernández (Mexico) Ó Ortiz	3	6	7
(United Kingdom) M Petchey (United States) K Thorne	6	7
(Ecuador) N Lapentti (Israel) E Ran	1	6
(Egypt) T El-Sawy (Hungary) G Köves	4	6	6
(United States) S Cannon (United States) B Shelton	6	2	2
Q	(Argentina) G Etlis (Italy) F Maggi	2	6
3	(Czech Republic) K Nováček (Czech Republic) J Novák	6	7
WC	(Mexico) E Casas (Mexico) R Ramírez	6	6
WC	(Argentina) R Gattiker (Mexico) G Martínez	2	4
(United States) J Belloli (Portugal) J Cunha e Silva	3	6
2	(Venezuela) N Pereira (Spain) E Sánchez	6	7

Quarterfinals
1	(Argentina) L Lobo (Spain) J Sánchez	6	3	5
(United States) D Johnson (United States) F Montana	3	6	7
WC	(Mexico) A Hernández (Mexico) Ó Ortiz	7	6	3
(United Kingdom) M Petchey (United States) K Thorne	6	7	6
(Egypt) T El-Sawy (Hungary) G Köves	6	7
3	(Czech Republic) K Nováček (Czech Republic) J Novák	4	6
WC	(Mexico) E Casas (Mexico) R Ramírez	7	1	5
2	(Venezuela) N Pereira (Spain) E Sánchez	5	6	7

Semifinals
(United States) D Johnson (United States) F Montana	6	6	7
(United Kingdom) M Petchey (United States) K Thorne	7	3	6
(Egypt) T El-Sawy (Hungary) G Köves	2	7	3
2	(Venezuela) N Pereira (Spain) E Sánchez	6	5	6

Final
(United States) D Johnson (United States) F Montana	6	6
2	(Venezuela) N Pereira (Spain) E Sánchez	2	4
