= 2000 Abierto Mexicano Pegaso – Singles =

Singles
- 2000 Abierto Mexicano Pegaso

Final
- Champion: (Argentina) Juan Ignacio Chela
- Runner-up: (Argentina) Mariano Puerta
- Score: 6–4, 7–6^{(7–4)}

Details
- Draw: 32 (3WC/4Q/1LL/1SE)
- Seeds: 8

Events
Singles	Doubles
← 1998 ·	Mexican Open	· 2001 →

Jiří Novák was the last champion in 1998. He chose to compete at London during the same week, losing in the first round.

Juan Ignacio Chela won the title by defeating Mariano Puerta 6–4, 7–6^{(7–4)} in the final.

== Seeds ==
1. (Brazil) Gustavo Kuerten (second round)
2. (Ecuador) Nicolás Lapentti (quarterfinals)
3. (Brazil) Fernando Meligeni (second round)
4. (Austria) Stefan Koubek (semifinals)
5. (Spain) Francisco Clavet (first round)
6. (Spain) Fernando Vicente (first round)
7. (Argentina) Franco Squillari (semifinals)
8. (France) Arnaud Di Pasquale (first round)

== Draw ==
=== Key ===
- Q = Qualifier
- WC = Wild card
- LL = Lucky loser
- Alt = Alternate
- SE = Special exempt
- PR = Protected ranking
- ITF = ITF entry
- JE = Junior exempt
- w/o = Walkover
- r = Retired
- d = Defaulted
- SR = Special ranking

=== Finals ===
Semifinals
Q	(Argentina) Juan Ignacio Chela	7^{7}	6
4	(Austria) Stefan Koubek	6^{2}	3
WC	(Argentina) Mariano Puerta	6	6
7	(Argentina) Franco Squillari	4	1

Final
Q	(Argentina) Juan Ignacio Chela	6	7^{7}
WC	(Argentina) Mariano Puerta	4	6^{4}

=== Top half ===
First round
1	(Brazil) G Kuerten	6	3	6
Q	(Argentina) G Etlis	4	6	3
(Zimbabwe) B Black	2	3
Q	(Argentina) JI Chela	6	6
(Costa Rica) JA Marín	6^{6}	6	0
(Germany) M Hantschk	7^{8}	3	6
LL	(Bulgaria) O Stanoytchev	6	7
8	(France) A Di Pasquale	1	5
4	(Austria) S Koubek	6	6
(Spain) A Portas	1	3
SE	(Brazil) A Sá	6	2	4
(Australia) R Fromberg	4	6	6
(Italy) L Tieleman	2	4
WC	(Mexico) A Hernández	6	6
(Argentina) G Gaudio	6	6
5	(Spain) F Clavet	3	1

Second round
1	(Brazil) G Kuerten	6	6^{8}	4
Q	(Argentina) JI Chela	3	7^{10}	6
(Germany) M Hantschk	6	1	6
LL	(Bulgaria) O Stanoytchev	3	6	2
4	(Austria) S Koubek	6^{5}	6	6
(Australia) R Fromberg	7^{7}	4	4
WC	(Mexico) A Hernández	6	3	3
(Argentina) G Gaudio	3	6	6

Quarterfinals
Q	(Argentina) JI Chela	6	7^{7}
(Germany) M Hantschk	3	6^{3}
4	(Austria) S Koubek	7^{7}	6
(Argentina) G Gaudio	6^{5}	4

Semifinals
Q	(Argentina) JI Chela	7^{7}	6
4	(Austria) S Koubek	6^{2}	3

=== Bottom half ===
First round
6	(Spain) F Vicente	5	4
WC	(Argentina) M Puerta	7	6
(Argentina) H Gumy	6	6
(France) A Dupuis	4	3
(Argentina) G Cañas	4
(Chile) N Massú	1^{r}
WC	(Spain) S Bruguera	6^{5}	6^{3}
3	(Brazil) F Meligeni	7^{7}	7^{7}
7	(Argentina) F Squillari	3	6	6
(Spain) G Blanco	6	4	1
(Spain) J Díaz	3	4
(Haiti) R Agénor	6	6
Q	(Spain) JA Viloca	6	4	1
(Armenia) S Sargsian	3	6	6
Q	(Czech Republic) B Ulihrach	4	2
2	(Ecuador) N Lapentti	6	6

Second round
WC	(Argentina) M Puerta	6	6
(Argentina) H Gumy	4	4
(Argentina) G Cañas	6	4	6
3	(Brazil) F Meligeni	2	6	3
7	(Argentina) F Squillari	7	6
(Haiti) R Agénor	5	2
(Armenia) S Sargsian	5	6	1
2	(Ecuador) N Lapentti	7	4	6

Quarterfinals
WC	(Argentina) M Puerta	6	6
(Argentina) G Cañas	2	3
7	(Argentina) F Squillari	6	7^{7}
2	(Ecuador) N Lapentti	4	6^{3}

Semifinals
WC	(Argentina) M Puerta	6	6
7	(Argentina) F Squillari	4	1
