= 1997 Abierto Mexicano de Tenis – Singles =

Singles
- 1997 Abierto Mexicano de Tenis

Final
- Champion: (Spain) Francisco Clavet
- Runner-up: (Spain) Juan Albert Viloca
- Score: 6–4, 7–6^{(9–7)}

Details
- Draw: 32 (4Q/3WC)
- Seeds: 8

Events
| Singles | Doubles |
| ← 1996 · | Mexican Open | · 1998 → |

Thomas Muster was the defending champion, but chose to compete in Stuttgart at the same week.

Francisco Clavet won the title by defeating Juan Albert Viloca 6–4, 7–6^{(9–7)} in the final.

== Seeds ==
1. (Spain) Francisco Clavet (champion)
2. (Spain) Javier Sánchez (first round)
3. (Uruguay) Marcelo Filippini (first round)
4. (Spain) Galo Blanco (second round)
5. (Spain) Julián Alonso (first round)
6. (Argentina) Hernán Gumy (first round)
7. (Spain) Carlos Costa (second round)
8. (Morocco) Karim Alami (first round)

== Draw ==
=== Key ===
- Q = Qualifier
- WC = Wild card
- LL = Lucky loser
- Alt = Alternate
- SE = Special exempt
- PR = Protected ranking
- ITF = ITF entry
- JE = Junior exempt
- w/o = Walkover
- r = Retired
- d = Defaulted
- SR = Special ranking

=== Finals ===
Semifinals
1 | (Spain) Francisco Clavet | 7 | 7^{7}
(Ecuador) Nicolás Lapentti | 5 | 6^{5}
(Brazil) Fernando Meligeni | 3 | 1
(Spain) Juan Albert Viloca | 6 | 6

Final
1 | (Spain) Francisco Clavet | 6 | 7^{9}
(Spain) Juan Albert Viloca | 4 | 6^{7}

=== Top half ===
First round
1 | (Spain) F Clavet | 4 | 6 | 6
(Italy) A Gaudenzi | 6 | 2 | 0
(Spain) J Burillo | 6 | 6
(Sweden) T Nydahl | 0 | 0
Q | (Brazil) A Sá | 0 | 7^{11} | 6
(Italy) D Sanguinetti | 6 | 6^{9} | 2
WC | (Mexico) L Herrera | 6^{5} | 6 | 6
8 | (Morocco) K Alami | 7^{7} | 1 | 2
4 | (Spain) G Blanco | 6 | 6
Q | (France) F Fontang | 3 | 4
(Ecuador) N Lapentti | 6 | 6
(Uzbekistan) O Ogorodov | 2 | 2
(Spain) F Vicente | 3 | 6 | 4
(Spain) E Benfele Álvarez | 6 | 3 | 6
(Germany) M Craca | 5 | 6 | 6
5 | (Spain) J Alonso | 7 | 3 | 3

Second round
1 | (Spain) F Clavet | 3 | 6 | 7
(Spain) J Burillo | 6 | 4 | 5
Q | (Brazil) A Sá | 2 | 6 | 6
WC | (Mexico) L Herrera | 6 | 3 | 4
4 | (Spain) G Blanco | 3 | 0
(Ecuador) N Lapentti | 6 | 6
(Spain) E Benfele Álvarez | 6 | 6
(Germany) M Craca | 3 | 3

Quarterfinals
1 | (Spain) F Clavet | 6 | 7^{7}
Q | (Brazil) A Sá | 3 | 6^{4}
(Ecuador) N Lapentti | 6 | 4 | 7
(Spain) E Benfele Álvarez | 2 | 6 | 5

Semifinals
1 | (Spain) F Clavet | 7 | 7^{7}
(Ecuador) N Lapentti | 5 | 6^{5}

=== Bottom half ===
First round
6 | (Argentina) H Gumy | 1 | 6 | 1
Q | (Argentina) L Arnold Ker | 6 | 0 | 6
(Argentina) F Squillari | 4 | 4
Q | (Argentina) G Etlis | 6 | 6
(Paraguay) R Delgado | 6 | 6
(Germany) O Gross | 0 | 1
(Brazil) F Meligeni | 4 | 7^{7} | 6
3 | (Uruguay) M Filippini | 6 | 6^{5} | 1
7 | (Spain) C Costa | 4 | 6 | 6
(Spain) A Martín | 6 | 2 | 4
(Czech Republic) R Vašek | 6 | 1 | 4
(Spain) JA Viloca | 1 | 6 | 6
WC | (Mexico) A Hernández | 6 | 6
WC | (Mexico) M Osorio | 1 | 1
(Spain) JA Marín | 7 | 6
2 | (Spain) J Sánchez | 5 | 3

Second round
Q | (Argentina) L Arnold Ker | 6 | 6
Q | (Argentina) G Etlis | 3 | 3
(Paraguay) R Delgado | 3 | 5
(Brazil) F Meligeni | 6 | 7
7 | (Spain) C Costa | 4 | 3
(Spain) JA Viloca | 6 | 6
WC | (Mexico) A Hernández | 3 | 6 | 4
(Spain) JA Marín | 6 | 4 | 6

Quarterfinals
Q | (Argentina) L Arnold Ker | 6 | 6^{4} | 0
(Brazil) F Meligeni | 2 | 7^{7} | 6
(Spain) JA Viloca | 6 | 6
(Spain) JA Marín | 4 | 2

Semifinals
(Brazil) F Meligeni | 3 | 1
(Spain) JA Viloca | 6 | 6
