= 2000 Abierto Mexicano Pegaso – Doubles =

Doubles
- 2000 Abierto Mexicano Pegaso

Final
- Champions: (Zimbabwe) Byron Black (United States) Donald Johnson
- Runners-up: (Argentina) Gastón Etlis (Argentina) Martín Rodríguez
- Score: 6–3, 7–5

Details
- Draw: 16 (2WC/1Q)
- Seeds: 4

Events
Singles	Doubles
- Mexican Open

Jiří Novák and David Rikl were the last champions in 1998. None competed this year.

Byron Black and Donald Johnson won the title by defeating qualifiers Gastón Etlis and Martín Rodríguez 6–3, 7–5 in the final.

== Seeds ==
1. (Zimbabwe) Byron Black / (United States) Donald Johnson (champions)
2. (Argentina) Pablo Albano / (South Africa) Brent Haygarth (first round)
3. (Italy) Massimo Bertolini / (Italy) Cristian Brandi (quarterfinals)
4. (Spain) Tomás Carbonell / (Spain) Javier Sánchez (first round)

== Draw ==
Key

- Q = Qualifier
- WC = Wild card
- LL = Lucky loser
- Alt = Alternate
- ITF = ITF entry
- PR = Protected ranking
- SR = Special ranking
- SE = Special exempt
- JE = Junior exempt
- JR = Junior Accelerator Programme entrant
- CO = College Accelerator Programme entrant
- NG = Next Gen Accelerator Program entrant
- w/o = Walkover
- r = Retired
- d = Defaulted

=== Draw ===
First round
1	(Zimbabwe) B Black (United States) D Johnson	6	6
(Australia) M Tebbutt (United States) J Waite	1	3
WC	(Brazil) G Kuerten (Brazil) A Simoni	6	7^{7}
(Argentina) M Hood (Argentina) S Prieto	4	6^{4}
4	(Spain) T Carbonell (Spain) J Sánchez	4	4
(Argentina) M García (Argentina) M Puerta	6	6
(Spain) JI Carrasco (Spain) J Velasco Jr.	6	4	6
(South Africa) L Bale (South Africa) G Stafford	2	6	3
(Mexico) Ó Ortiz (Mexico) D Roditi	4	7^{7}	5
Q	(Argentina) G Etlis (Argentina) M Rodríguez	6	6^{3}	7
WC	(Ecuador) G Lapentti (Ecuador) N Lapentti	6	3	4
3	(Italy) M Bertolini (Italy) C Brandi	3	6	6
(United States) F Montana (Israel) E Ran	6	6
(United States) P Galbraith (United States) B MacPhie	3	3
(Brazil) J Oncins (Argentina) D Orsanic	6	4	6
2	(Argentina) P Albano (South Africa) B Haygarth	3	6	3

Quarterfinals
1	(Zimbabwe) B Black (United States) D Johnson	6	7^{7}
WC	(Brazil) G Kuerten (Brazil) A Simoni	1	6^{4}
(Argentina) M García (Argentina) M Puerta	7^{7}	6^{5}	6
(Spain) JI Carrasco (Spain) J Velasco Jr.	6^{4}	7^{7}	3
Q	(Argentina) G Etlis (Argentina) M Rodríguez	6	6
3	(Italy) M Bertolini (Italy) C Brandi	4	4
(United States) F Montana (Israel) E Ran	0	4
(Brazil) J Oncins (Argentina) D Orsanic	6	6

Semifinals
1	(Zimbabwe) B Black (United States) D Johnson	7^{7}	6
(Argentina) M García (Argentina) M Puerta	6^{1}	4
Q	(Argentina) G Etlis (Argentina) M Rodríguez	6	6
(Brazil) J Oncins (Argentina) D Orsanic	3	3

Final
1	(Zimbabwe) B Black (United States) D Johnson	6	7
Q	(Argentina) G Etlis (Argentina) M Rodríguez	3	5
