= 1996 Abierto Mexicano de Tenis – Singles =

Singles
- 1996 Abierto Mexicano de Tenis

Final
- Champion: (Austria) Thomas Muster
- Runner-up: (Czech Republic) Jiří Novák
- Score: 7–6^{(7–3)}, 6–2

Details
- Draw: 32 (4Q/3WC)
- Seeds: 8

Events
Singles	Doubles
← 1995 ·	Abierto Mexicano de Tenis	· 1997 →

Thomas Muster was the defending champion and won in the final 7–6^{(7–3)}, 6–2 against Jiří Novák.

== Seeds ==
1. (Austria) Thomas Muster (champion)
2. (Italy) Andrea Gaudenzi (quarterfinals)
3. (Czech Republic) Jiří Novák (final)
4. (Argentina) Javier Frana (quarterfinals)
5. (Spain) Francisco Clavet (semifinals)
6. (Spain) Javier Sánchez (quarterfinals)
7. (Brazil) Fernando Meligeni (semifinals)
8. (Spain) Félix Mantilla (second round)

== Draw ==
=== Key ===
- Q = Qualifier
- WC = Wild card
- LL = Lucky loser
- Alt = Alternate
- SE = Special exempt
- PR = Protected ranking
- ITF = ITF entry
- JE = Junior exempt
- w/o = Walkover
- r = Retired
- d = Defaulted
- SR = Special ranking

=== Finals ===
Semifinals
1	(Austria) Thomas Muster	6	2	6
5	(Spain) Francisco Clavet	3	6	1
3	(Czech Republic) Jiří Novák	4	7	6
7	(Brazil) Fernando Meligeni	6	5	4

Final
1	(Austria) Thomas Muster	7^{7}	6
3	(Czech Republic) Jiří Novák	6^{3}	2

=== Top half ===
First round
1	(Austria) T Muster	6	6
Q	(Spain) J A Viloca	4	4
(Israel) E Ran	4	6	3
Q	(Argentina) L Lobo	6	3	6
(Argentina) G Etlis	5	6^{3}
WC	(Mexico) A Hernández	7	7^{7}
(Portugal) J Cunha e Silva	6^{4}	4
8	(Spain) F Mantilla	7^{7}	6
4	(Argentina) J Frana	6	6^{4}	7
WC	(Mexico) Ó Ortiz	2	7^{7}	5
(Spain) E Sánchez	2	2
(Portugal) N Marques	6	6
(Hungary) S Noszály	3	2
(Colombia) M Hadad	6	6
(Venezuela) N Pereira	3	2
5	(Spain) F Clavet	6	6

Second round
1	(Austria) T Muster	7^{7}	6
Q	(Argentina) L Lobo	6^{3}	2
WC	(Mexico) A Hernández	6	7
8	(Spain) F Mantilla	2	5
4	(Argentina) J Frana	6	6
(Portugal) N Marques	4	4
(Colombia) M Hadad	2	5
5	(Spain) F Clavet	6	7

Quarterfinals
1	(Austria) T Muster	6	6
WC	(Mexico) A Hernández	4	4
4	(Argentina) J Frana	5	3
5	(Spain) F Clavet	7	6

Semifinals
1	(Austria) T Muster	6	2	6
5	(Spain) F Clavet	3	6	1

=== Bottom half ===
First round
6	(Spain) J Sánchez	6	6
(Spain) J L Rascon	3	1
(Ecuador) L Morejón	6^{4}	2
(France) F Vitoux	7^{7}	6
(Ecuador) N Lapentti	6^{4}	7^{7}	2
(France) F Fontang	7^{7}	6^{5}	6
Q	(United States) F Montana	7^{7}	0	1
3	(Czech Republic) J Novák	6^{4}	6	6
7	(Brazil) F Meligeni	6	7^{7}
Q	(Colombia) M Rincón	4	6^{5}
(United States) B Shelton	3	7^{7}	6
(United Kingdom) M Petchey	6	6^{5}	2
(United States) S Campbell	3	2
WC	(Mexico) L Lavalle	6	6
(Belgium) K Goossens	3	6	3
2	(Italy) A Gaudenzi	6	4	6

Second round
6	(Spain) J Sánchez	6	6
(France) F Vitoux	3	3
(France) F Fontang	6^{4}	3
3	(Czech Republic) J Novák	7^{7}	6
7	(Brazil) F Meligeni	6	6
(United States) B Shelton	2	4
WC	(Mexico) L Lavalle	3	6^{6}
2	(Italy) A Gaudenzi	6	7^{8}

Quarterfinals
6	(Spain) J Sánchez	3	6	4
3	(Czech Republic) J Novák	6	1	6
7	(Brazil) F Meligeni	7^{7}	2	7
2	(Italy) A Gaudenzi	6^{3}	6	5

Semifinals
3	(Czech Republic) J Novák	4	7	6
7	(Brazil) F Meligeni	6	5	4
