= 1998 Abierto Mexicano Telcel =

- Date: 26 October – 1 November
- Edition: 6th
- Category: International Series
- Draw: 32S / 16D
- Prize money: $315,000
- Surface: Clay / outdoor
- Location: Mexico City, Mexico

Champions

Singles
- (Czech Republic) Jiří Novák

Doubles
- (Czech Republic) Jiří Novák / (Czech Republic) David Rikl
← 1997 ·	Mexican Open	· 2000 →

The 1998 Abierto Mexicano Telcel was a men's tennis tournament played on outdoor clay courts in Mexico City, it was a part of the International Series category of the 1998 ATP Tour. It was the sixth edition of the tournament and was held from 26 October through 1 November. Unseeded Jiří Novák won the singles title.

== Finals ==
=== Singles ===
(Czech Republic) Jiří Novák defeated (Belgium) Xavier Malisse, 6–3, 6–3

- It was Novák 1st singles title of the year and the 2nd of his career.

=== Doubles ===
(Czech Republic) Jiří Novák / (Czech Republic) David Rikl defeated (Argentina) Daniel Orsanic / (Mexico) David Roditi, 6–4, 6–2
