= 1995 Abierto Mexicano Telcel – Singles =

Singles
- 1995 Abierto Mexicano Telcel

Final
- Champion: (Austria) Thomas Muster
- Runner-up: (Brazil) Fernando Meligeni
- Score: 7–6^{(7–4)}, 7–5

Details
- Draw: 32 (4 Q / 3 WC )
- Seeds: 8

Events
Singles	Doubles
← 1994 ·	Abierto Mexicano Telcel	· 1996 →

Thomas Muster was the two-time defending champion and successfully defended his title, defeating Fernando Meligeni in the final, 7–6^{(7–4)}, 7–5.

== Seeds ==
1. (Spain) Alberto Berasategui (second round)
2. (Austria) Thomas Muster (champion)
3. (Spain) Àlex Corretja (semifinals)
4. (Spain) Carlos Costa (second round)
5. (Peru) Jaime Yzaga (first round)
6. (Spain) Francisco Clavet (semifinals)
7. (Spain) Albert Costa (first round)
8. (Spain) Óscar Martínez (quarterfinals)

== Draw ==
=== Key ===
- Q = Qualifier
- WC = Wild card
- LL = Lucky loser
- Alt = Alternate
- SE = Special exempt
- PR = Protected ranking
- ITF = ITF entry
- JE = Junior exempt
- w/o = Walkover
- r = Retired
- d = Defaulted
- SR = Special ranking

=== Finals ===
Semifinals
(Brazil) Fernando Meligeni	6	6
3	(Spain) Àlex Corretja	1	0
6	(Spain) Francisco Clavet	6^{3}	6	2
2	(Austria) Thomas Muster	7^{7}	1	6

Final
(Brazil) Fernando Meligeni	6^{4}	5
2	(Austria) Thomas Muster	7^{7}	7

=== Top half ===
First round
1	(Spain) A Berasategui	7^{7}	6
(Czech Republic) D Rikl	6^{1}	4
Q	(France) G Solves	4	6	3
(United Kingdom) M Petchey	6	4	6
(Brazil) F Meligeni	6	6
Q	(Colombia) M Rincón	3	3
(Germany) M-K Goellner	6	6
7	(Spain) A Costa	3	4
3	(Spain) À Corretja	6	7
(Italy) D Nargiso	3	5
(Spain) A Mancisidor	2	4
(Mexico) L Herrera	6	6
(Kenya) P Wekesa	3	0
(Spain) J Burillo	6	6
(Czech Republic) B Ulihrach	6	6
5	(Peru) J Yzaga	4	4

Second round
1	(Spain) A Berasategui	6^{5}	4
(United Kingdom) M Petchey	7^{7}	6
(Brazil) F Meligeni	6	6^{5}	6
(Germany) M-K Goellener	2	7^{7}	1
3	(Spain) À Corretja	7^{7}	6
(Mexico) L Herrera	6^{5}	2
(Spain) J Burillo	5	6	6
(Czech Republic) B Ulihrach	7	3	3

Quarterfinals
(United Kingdom) M Petchey	6	3	6^{3}
(Brazil) F Meligeni	3	6	7^{7}
3	(Spain) À Corretja	7	3	7^{7}
(Spain) J Burillo	5	6	6^{5}

Semifinals
(Brazil) F Meligeni	6	6
3	(Spain) À Corretja	1	0

=== Bottom half ===
First round
6	(Spain) F Clavet	7	6
(United States) A O'Brien	5	3
(United States) B Shelton	6	1	6
WC	(Mexico) Ó Ortiz	0	6	2
(Colombia) M Hadad	6	6
Q	(Mexico) A Moreno	3	2
(Argentina) J Frana	6	6^{5}	5
4	(Spain) C Costa	3	7^{7}	7
8	(Spain) Ó Martínez	7	6
Q	(United States) K Thorne	5	4
(Argentina) H Gumy	7	4	4
WC	(Mexico) A Hernández	5	6	6
(Spain) J Arrese	6	4	3
WC	(Mexico) L Lavalle	1	6	6
(Venezuela) N Pereira	2	1
2	(Austria) T Muster	6	6

Second round
6	(Spain) F Clavet	6	6
(United States) B Shelton	0	4
(Colombia) M Hadad	6	6
4	(Spain) C Costa	1	3
8	(Spain) Ó Martínez	6	4	7
WC	(Mexico) A Hernández	2	6	5
WC	(Mexico) L Lavalle	4	1
2	(Austria) T Muster	6	6

Quarterfinals
6	(Spain) F Clavet	6	6
(Colombia) M Hadad	4	1
8	(Spain) Ó Martínez	6^{6}	1
2	(Austria) T Muster	7^{7}	6

Semifinals
6	(Spain) F Clavet	6^{3}	6	2
2	(Austria) T Muster	7^{7}	1	6
