= 1997 Monte Carlo Open – Doubles =

Doubles
- 1997 Monte Carlo Open

Final
- Champions: (United States) Donald Johnson (United States) Francisco Montana
- Runners-up: (Netherlands) Jacco Eltingh (Netherlands) Paul Haarhuis
- Score: 7–6, 2–6, 7–6

Details
- Draw: 28 (4WC/2Q)
- Seeds: 8

Events
| Singles | Doubles |
| ← 1996 · | Monte-Carlo Masters | · 1998 → |

Ellis Ferreira and Jan Siemerink were the defending champions, but competed this year with different partners. Ferreira teamed up with Patrick Galbraith and lost in quarterfinals to tournament winners Donald Johnson and Francisco Montana, while Siemerink teamed up with Menno Oosting and lost in first round to Pablo Albano and Àlex Corretja.

Donald Johnson and Francisco Montana won the title by defeating Jacco Eltingh and Paul Haarhuis 7–6, 2–6, 7–6 in the final.

== Seeds ==
The top four seeds received a bye to the second round.

1. (Netherlands) Jacco Eltingh / (Netherlands) Paul Haarhuis (final)
2. (Russia) Yevgeny Kafelnikov / (Czech Republic) Daniel Vacek (semifinals)
3. (South Africa) Ellis Ferreira / (United States) Patrick Galbraith (quarterfinals)
4. (Argentina) Luis Lobo / (Spain) Javier Sánchez (quarterfinals)
5. (Sweden) Jonas Björkman / (Sweden) Nicklas Kulti (semifinals)
6. (South Africa) David Adams / (Russia) Andrei Olhovskiy (first round)
7. (Belgium) Libor Pimek / (South Africa) Byron Talbot (quarterfinals)
8. (United Kingdom) Neil Broad / (South Africa) Piet Norval (quarterfinals)

== Draw ==
=== Key ===
- Q = Qualifier
- WC = Wild card
- LL = Lucky loser
- Alt = Alternate
- ITF = ITF entry
- PR = Protected ranking
- SR = Special ranking
- SE = Special exempt
- JE = Junior exempt
- JR = Junior Accelerator Programme entrant
- CO = College Accelerator Programme entrant
- NG = Next Gen Accelerator Program entrant
- w/o = Walkover
- r = Retired
- d = Defaulted

=== Finals ===
Semifinals
1 | (Netherlands) Jacco Eltingh (Netherlands) Paul Haarhuis | 5 | 6 | 7
5 | (Sweden) Jonas Björkman (Sweden) Nicklas Kulti | 7 | 2 | 5
(United States) Donald Johnson (United States) Francisco Montana | 6 | 6
2 | (Russia) Yevgeny Kafelnikov (Czech Republic) Daniel Vacek | 1 | 4

Final
1 | (Netherlands) Jacco Eltingh (Netherlands) Paul Haarhuis | 6 | 6 | 6
(United States) Donald Johnson (United States) Francisco Montana | 7 | 2 | 7

=== Top half ===
First round
WC | (Italy) O Camporese (Italy) D Nargiso | 2 | 6
(South Africa) M Barnard (Italy) F Messori | 6 | 7
(Argentina) P Albano (Spain) À Corretja | 7 | 6
(Netherlands) M Oosting (Netherlands) J Siemerink | 5 | 4
(United States) D Randall (United States) J Waite | 3 | 4
8 | (United Kingdom) N Broad (South Africa) P Norval | 6 | 6
WC | (United States) J Courier (Switzerland) M Rosset | 7 | 6
(Italy) A Gaudenzi (Netherlands) S Schalken | 6 | 1
(Sweden) D Ekerot (United States) TJ Middleton | 2 | 6 | 6
(Australia) J Eagle (Australia) A Florent | 6 | 3 | 2
(United States) T Kronemann (Australia) D Macpherson | 6 | 5 | 5
5 | (Sweden) J Björkman (Sweden) N Kulti | 3 | 7 | 7

Second round
1 | (Netherlands) J Eltingh (Netherlands) P Haarhuis | 6 | 6
(South Africa) M Barnard (Italy) F Messori | 1 | 4
(Argentina) P Albano (Spain) À Corretja | 3 | 5
8 | (United Kingdom) N Broad (South Africa) P Norval | 6 | 7
4 | (Argentina) L Lobo (Spain) J Sánchez | 3 | 6 | 4
WC | (United States) J Courier (Switzerland) M Rosset | 6 | 2 | 1^{d}
(Sweden) D Ekerot (United States) TJ Middleton | 2 | 2
5 | (Sweden) J Björkman (Sweden) N Kulti | 6 | 6

Quarterfinals
1 | (Netherlands) J Eltingh (Netherlands) P Haarhuis | 6 | 6
8 | (United Kingdom) N Broad (South Africa) P Norval | 3 | 3
4 | (Argentina) L Lobo (Spain) J Sánchez | 6 | 1 | 5
5 | (Sweden) J Björkman (Sweden) N Kulti | 4 | 6 | 7

Semifinals
1 | (Netherlands) J Eltingh (Netherlands) P Haarhuis | 5 | 6 | 7
5 | (Sweden) J Björkman (Sweden) N Kulti | 7 | 2 | 5

=== Bottom half ===
First round
6 | (South Africa) D Adams (Russia) A Olhovskiy | 5 | 4
(Spain) T Carbonell (Spain) F Roig | 7 | 6
(United States) D Johnson (United States) F Montana | 5 | 6 | 6
WC | (Ukraine) A Medvedev (Germany) M Stich | 7 | 1 | 4
WC | (France) A Boetsch (France) C Pioline | 7 | 6 | 6
Q | (South Africa) B Haygarth (Belarus) M Mirnyi | 6 | 7 | 3
7 | (Belgium) L Pimek (South Africa) B Talbot | 6 | 6
(Italy) C Brandi (Netherlands) F Wibier | 2 | 4
Q | (Brazil) G Kuerten (Ecuador) N Lapentti | 6 | 7
(Portugal) E Couto (Portugal) N Marques | 4 | 5
(France) O Delaître (France) F Santoro | 6 | 6
(Sweden) P Nyborg (Netherlands) S Noteboom | 4 | 4

Second round
(Spain) T Carbonell (Spain) F Roig | 3 | 3
(United States) D Johnson (United States) F Montana | 6 | 6
WC | (France) A Boetsch (France) C Pioline
3 | (South Africa) E Ferreira (United States) P Galbraith | w | / | o
7 | (Belgium) L Pimek (South Africa) B Talbot | 6 | 6
Q | (Brazil) G Kuerten (Ecuador) N Lapentti | 0 | 4
(France) O Delaître (France) F Santoro | 3 | 6 | 3
2 | (Russia) Y Kafelnikov (Czech Republic) D Vacek | 6 | 4 | 6

Quarterfinals
(United States) D Johnson (United States) F Montana | 6 | 6
3 | (South Africa) E Ferreira (United States) P Galbraith | 4 | 4
7 | (Belgium) L Pimek (South Africa) B Talbot | 4 | 6
2 | (Russia) Y Kafelnikov (Czech Republic) D Vacek | 6 | 7

Semifinals
(United States) D Johnson (United States) F Montana | 6 | 6
2 | (Russia) Y Kafelnikov (Czech Republic) D Vacek | 1 | 4

== Qualifying ==
=== Qualifying seeds ===
1. (South Africa) Brent Haygarth / (Belarus) Max Mirnyi (qualified)
2. (South Africa) Clinton Ferreira / (North Macedonia) Aleksandar Kitinov (first round)
3. (Brazil) Gustavo Kuerten / (Ecuador) Nicolás Lapentti (qualified)
4. (Federal Republic of Yugoslavia) Nebojša Đorđević / (Czech Republic) Sláva Doseděl (first round)

=== Qualifiers ===
1. (South Africa) Brent Haygarth / (Belarus) Max Mirnyi
2. (Brazil) Gustavo Kuerten / (Ecuador) Nicolás Lapentti

=== Qualifying draw ===
==== First qualifier ====
First round
1 | (South Africa) Brent Haygarth (Belarus) Max Mirnyi | 2 | 6 | 6
WC | (Spain) Emilio Benfele Álvarez (Monaco) Sébastien Graeff | 6 | 3 | 1
WC | (Sweden) Thomas Enqvist (Sweden) Magnus Larsson | 6 | 6
4 | (Federal Republic of Yugoslavia) Nebojša Đorđević (Czech Republic) Sláva Doseděl | 3 | 1

Qualifying competition
1 | (South Africa) Brent Haygarth (Belarus) Max Mirnyi | 6 | 6
WC | (Sweden) Thomas Enqvist (Sweden) Magnus Larsson | 3 | 3

==== Second qualifier ====
First round
2 | (South Africa) Clinton Ferreira (North Macedonia) Aleksandar Kitinov | 5 | 2
WC | (South Africa) Wayne Ferreira (Chile) Marcelo Ríos | 7 | 6
(Germany) Patrick Baur (Germany) Jens Knippschild | 6 | 2
3 | (Brazil) Gustavo Kuerten (Ecuador) Nicolás Lapentti | 7 | 6

Qualifying competition
WC | (South Africa) Wayne Ferreira (Chile) Marcelo Ríos | 6 | 6 | 2
3 | (Brazil) Gustavo Kuerten (Ecuador) Nicolás Lapentti | 3 | 7 | 6
