= 1998 Monte Carlo Open – Doubles =

Doubles
- 1998 Monte Carlo Open

Final
- Champions: (Netherlands) Jacco Eltingh (Netherlands) Paul Haarhuis
- Runners-up: (Australia) Todd Woodbridge (Australia) Mark Woodforde
- Score: 6–4, 6–2

Events
Singles	Doubles
← 1997 ·	Monte Carlo Open	· 1999 →

Donald Johnson and Francisco Montana were the defending champions, but lost in the second round to Tomás Carbonell and Francisco Roig.

Jacco Eltingh and Paul Haarhuis won the title, defeating Todd Woodbridge and Mark Woodforde, 6–4, 6–2.

== Seeds ==
Champion seeds are indicated in bold text while text in italics indicates the round in which those seeds were eliminated. The top four seeds received a bye to the second round.

1. (Australia) Todd Woodbridge / (Australia) Mark Woodforde (final)
2. (Netherlands) **Jacco Eltingh** / (Netherlands) **Paul Haarhuis (champions)**
3. (Russia) Yevgeny Kafelnikov / (Czech Republic) Daniel Vacek (second round)
4. (India) Mahesh Bhupathi / (India) Leander Paes (semifinals)
5. (Sweden) Jonas Björkman / (Sweden) Nicklas Kulti (first round)
6. (South Africa) Ellis Ferreira / (United States) Rick Leach (second round)
7. (Czech Republic) Martin Damm / (United States) Jim Grabb (first round)
8. (United States) Donald Johnson / (United States) Francisco Montana (second round)

== Draw ==
=== Key ===
- Q = Qualifier
- WC = Wild card
- LL = Lucky loser
- Alt = Alternate
- ITF = ITF entry
- PR = Protected ranking
- SR = Special ranking
- SE = Special exempt
- JE = Junior exempt
- JR = Junior Accelerator Programme entrant
- CO = College Accelerator Programme entrant
- NG = Next Gen Accelerator Program entrant
- w/o = Walkover
- r = Retired
- d = Defaulted

=== Finals ===
Semifinals
1	(Australia) **Todd Woodbridge** **(Australia) Mark Woodforde**	**6**	**6**
(Czech Republic) Ctislav Doseděl (Russia) Andrei Olhovskiy	3	2
4	(India) Mahesh Bhupathi (India) Leander Paes	2	**7**	5
2	(Netherlands) **Jacco Eltingh** **(Netherlands) Paul Haarhuis**	**6**	6	**7**

Final
1	(Australia) Todd Woodbridge (Australia) Mark Woodforde	4	2
(Netherlands) **Jacco Eltingh** **(Netherlands) Paul Haarhuis**	**6**	**6**

=== Top half ===
First round
(South Africa) **D Adams** **(South Africa) W Ferreira**	4	**7**	**7**
(Czech Republic) C Suk (United States) J Tarango	**6**	5	5
(United States) **T Kronemann** **(Australia) D Macpherson**	**6**	**6**
(Mexico) D Roditi (Netherlands) D Wibier	3	4
(North Macedonia) **A Kitinov** **(Czech Republic) P Vízner**	**7**	**6**
7	(Czech Republic) M Damm (United States) J Grabb	6	3
(United States) **A Agassi** **(Czech Republic) P Korda**	1	**6**	**6**
(Italy) A Gaudenzi (Austria) T Muster	**6**	4	1
(Czech Republic) **C Doseděl** **(Russia) A Olhovskiy**	**7**	**6**
(Argentina) L Lobo (Spain) J Sánchez	5	3
(Spain) **J Alonso** **(Ecuador) N Lapentti**	2	**6**	**7**
5	(Sweden) J Björkman (Sweden) N Kulti	**6**	2	5

Second round
(South Africa) D Adams (South Africa) W Ferreira	6	2
1	(Australia) **T Woodbridge** **(Australia) M Woodforde**	**7**	**6**
(United States) **T Kronemann** **(Australia) D Macpherson**	**7**	**6**
(North Macedonia) A Kitinov (Czech Republic) P Vízner	6	1
3	(Russia) Y Kafelnikov (Czech Republic) D Vacek	5	0
(United States) **A Agassi** **(Czech Republic) P Korda**	**7**	**6**
(Czech Republic) **C Doseděl** **(Russia) A Olhovskiy**	**7**	**6**
(Spain) J Alonso (Ecuador) N Lapentti	6	2

Quarterfinals
1	(Australia) **T Woodbridge** **(Australia) M Woodforde**	5	**6**	**6**
(United States) T Kronemann (Australia) D Macpherson	**7**	3	2
(United States) A Agassi (Czech Republic) P Korda
(Czech Republic) **C Doseděl** **(Russia) A Olhovskiy**	w/o

Semifinals
1	(Australia) **T Woodbridge** **(Australia) M Woodforde**	**6**	**6**
(Czech Republic) C Doseděl (Russia) A Olhovskiy	3	2

=== Bottom half ===
First round
6	(South Africa) **E Ferreira** **(United States) R Leach**	**6**	**6**
(Sweden) T Johansson (Sweden) T Nydahl	3	2
(Netherlands) **T Kempers** **(Netherlands) M Oosting**	**7**	**6**
(United Kingdom) N Broad (South Africa) P Norval	5	4
(Argentina) **P Albano** **(Spain) À Corretja**	**6**	**6**
(United States) P Annacone (United States) P Sampras	2	2
8	(United States) **D Johnson** **(United States) F Montana**	**6**	**6**
(Italy) D Nargiso (Socialist Federal Republic of Yugoslavia) D Vemić	2	4
(Spain) **T Carbonell** **(Spain) F Roig**	**6**	5	**6**
(Brazil) G Kuerten (Australia) M Philippoussis	1	**7**	4
(Argentina) **D Orsanic** **(France) F Santoro**	**6**	**6**
(Australia) J Eagle (Australia) A Florent	4	2

Second round
6	(South Africa) E Ferreira (United States) R Leach
(Netherlands) **T Kempers** **(Netherlands) M Oosting**	w/o
(Argentina) P Albano (Spain) À Corretja	3	4
4	(India) **M Bhupathi** **(India) L Paes**	**6**	**6**
8	(United States) D Johnson (United States) F Montana	3	6
(Spain) **T Carbonell** **(Spain) F Roig**	**6**	**7**
(Argentina) D Orsanic (France) F Santoro	**6**	6	0
2	(Netherlands) **J Eltingh** **(Netherlands) P Haarhuis**	4	**7**	**6**

Quarterfinals
(Netherlands) T Kempers (Netherlands) M Oosting	2	4
4	(India) **M Bhupathi** **(India) L Paes**	**6**	**6**
(Spain) T Carbonell (Spain) F Roig	**6**	3	3
2	(Netherlands) **J Eltingh** **(Netherlands) P Haarhuis**	2	**6**	**6**

Semifinals
4	(India) M Bhupathi (India) L Paes	2	**7**	5
2	(Netherlands) **J Eltingh** **(Netherlands) P Haarhuis**	**6**	6	**7**
