= 2000 Abierto Mexicano Pegaso =

- Date: 21–27 February
- Edition: 7th
- Category: International Series Gold
- Draw: 32S / 16D
- Prize money: $700,000
- Surface: Clay / outdoor
- Location: Mexico City, Mexico

Champions

Singles
- (Argentina) Juan Ignacio Chela

Doubles
- (Zimbabwe) Byron Black / (United States) Donald Johnson
← 1998 ·	Mexican Open	· 2001 →

The 2000 Abierto Mexicano Pegaso was a men's tennis tournament played on outdoor clay courts in Mexico City, Mexico that was part of the International Series Gold category of the 2000 ATP Tour. It was the seventh edition of the tournament and was held from 21 February through 27 February 2000. Unseeded Juan Ignacio Chela, who entered the main draw as a qualifier, won the singles title.

== Finals ==
=== Singles ===
(Argentina) Juan Ignacio Chela defeated (Argentina) Mariano Puerta, 6–4, 7–6^{(7–4)}

- It was Chela's first singles title of his career.

=== Doubles ===
(Zimbabwe) Byron Black / (United States) Donald Johnson defeated (Argentina) Gastón Etlis / (Argentina) Martín Rodríguez, 6–3, 7–5
