= 1998 Monte Carlo Open =

- Date: 20–26 April
- Edition: 92nd
- Category: ATP Masters Series
- Draw: 56S / 28D
- Prize money: $2,450,000
- Surface: Clay / outdoor
- Location: Roquebrune-Cap-Martin, France
- Venue: Monte Carlo Country Club

Champions

Singles
- (Spain) Carlos Moyá

Doubles
- (Netherlands) Jacco Eltingh / (Netherlands) Paul Haarhuis
← 1997 ·	Monte Carlo Open	· 1999 →

The 1998 Monte Carlo Open was a men's tennis tournament played on outdoor clay courts. It was the 92nd edition of the Monte Carlo Open, and was part of the ATP Masters Series of the 1998 ATP Tour. It took place at the Monte Carlo Country Club in Roquebrune-Cap-Martin, France, near Monte Carlo, Monaco, from 20 April through 26 April 1998.

Fourteenth-seeded Carlos Moyá won the singles title.

== Finals ==
=== Singles ===
(Spain) Carlos Moyá defeated (France) Cédric Pioline, 6–3, 6–0, 7–5

- It was Carlos Moyá's 1st title of the year, and his 4th overall. It was his 1st Masters title of the year, and overall.

=== Doubles ===
(Netherlands) Jacco Eltingh / (Netherlands) Paul Haarhuis defeated (Australia) Todd Woodbridge / (Australia) Mark Woodforde, 6–4, 6–2
