= 1996 Abierto Mexicano de Tenis =

- Date: 4–10 March
- Edition: 4th
- Category: World Series
- Draw: 32S / 16D
- Prize money: $305,000
- Surface: Clay / outdoor
- Location: Mexico City, Mexico]

Champions

Singles
- (Austria) Thomas Muster

Doubles
- (United States) Donald Johnson / (United States) Francisco Montana
- Abierto Mexicano de Tenis

The 1996 Abierto Mexicano de Tenis, also known by its sponsored name Abierto Mexicano Telcel, was a men's tennis tournament played on outdoor clay courts in Mexico City, Mexico and was part of the World Series of the 1996 ATP Tour. It was the fourth edition of the tournament and took place from 4 March through 10 March 1996. First-seeded Thomas Muster won his fourth consecutive singles title at the event and he regained the world No. 1 ranking from Pete Sampras.

== Finals ==
=== Singles ===
(Austria) Thomas Muster defeated (Czech Republic) Jiří Novák 7–6^{(7–3)}, 6–2

- It was Muster's 1st singles title of the year and the 36th of his career.

=== Doubles ===
(United States) Donald Johnson / (United States) Francisco Montana defeated (Venezuela) Nicolás Pereira / (Spain) Emilio Sánchez 6–2, 6–4

- It was Johnson's 1st title of the year and the 1st of his career. It was Montana's 1st title of the year and the 4th of his career.
