= 1997 Monte Carlo Open – Singles =

Singles
- 1997 Monte Carlo Open

Final
- Champion: (Chile) Marcelo Ríos
- Runner-up: (Spain) Álex Corretja
- Score: 6–4, 6–3, 6–3

Details
- Draw: 56 (7Q / 4WC)
- Seeds: 16

Events
Singles	Doubles
← 1996 ·	Monte-Carlo Masters	· 1998 →

Marcelo Ríos defeated Àlex Corretja in the final, 6–4, 6–3, 6–3 to win the singles tennis title at the 1997 Monte Carlo Open.

Thomas Muster was the two-time defending champion, but lost in the second round to Fabrice Santoro.

== Seeds ==
The top eight seeds received a bye to the second round.

1. (United States) Pete Sampras (second round)
2. (Austria) Thomas Muster (second round)
3. (Russia) Yevgeny Kafelnikov (second round)
4. (Netherlands) Richard Krajicek (quarterfinals)
5. (Sweden) Thomas Enqvist (second round)
6. (Spain) Carlos Moyà (semifinals)
7. (Chile) Marcelo Ríos (champion)
8. (South Africa) Wayne Ferreira (second round)
9. (Germany) Boris Becker (first round)
10. (Spain) Álbert Costa (third round)
11. (Spain) Félix Mantilla (second round)
12. (Spain) Álex Corretja (final)
13. (United States) Jim Courier (second round)
14. (Spain) Alberto Berasategui (second round)
15. (Switzerland) Marc Rosset (second round)
16. (Spain) Sergi Bruguera (third round)

== Draw ==
=== Key ===
- Q = Qualifier
- WC = Wild card
- LL = Lucky loser
- Alt = Alternate
- SE = Special exempt
- PR = Protected ranking
- ITF = ITF entry
- JE = Junior exempt
- w/o = Walkover
- r = Retired
- d = Defaulted
- SR = Special ranking

=== Finals ===
Semifinals
7	(Chile) Marcelo Ríos	6	7^{7}
6	(Spain) Carlos Moyà	4	6^{5}
12	(Spain) Álex Corretja	6	6
WC	(France) Fabrice Santoro	4	4

Final
7	(Chile) Marcelo Ríos	6	6	6
12	(Spain) Álex Corretja	4	3	3

=== Top half ===
==== Section 1 ====
First round
(Sweden) M Larsson	6	6
(Morocco) H Arazi	3	3
(Czech Republic) D Vacek	6	6
(Sweden) M Tillström	1	3
(Spain) R Carretero	6^{2}	0
15	(Switzerland) M Rosset	7^{7}	6
10	(Spain) Á Costa	6	6
(Sweden) J Björkman	4	0
(Czech Republic) S Doseděl	6	3	6
Q	(Brazil) G Kuerten	1	6	1
WC	(Italy) A Gaudenzi	6	6
(France) L Roux	1	2

Second round
WC/1	(United States) P Sampras	6	2	3
(Sweden) M Larsson	3	6	6
(Czech Republic) D Vacek	7^{7}	6
15	(Switzerland) M Rosset	6^{5}	1
10	(Spain) Á Costa	6	6
(Czech Republic) S Doseděl	3	3
WC	(Italy) A Gaudenzi	2	2
7	(Chile) M Ríos	6	6

Third round
(Sweden) M Larsson	7	6
(Czech Republic) D Vacek	5	0
10	(Spain) Á Costa	6^{3}	4
7	(Chile) M Ríos	7^{7}	6

Quarterfinals
(Sweden) M Larsson	2	1
7	(Chile) M Ríos	6	6

==== Section 2 ====
First round
(Germany) M Stich	3	7	7
(Australia) M Woodforde	6	5	5
(Australia) M Philippoussis	7	7^{7}
(Argentina) H Gumy	5	6^{5}
(Slovakia) D Hrbatý	7^{7}	5	4
13	(United States) J Courier	6^{1}	7	6
11	(Spain) F Mantilla	6	6
(Czech Republic) M Damm	1	1
(Ukraine) A Medvedev	4	6	6
WC	(Sweden) N Kulti	6	2	3
(Sweden) T Johansson	1	2
(Spain) F Clavet	6	6

Second round
4	(Netherlands) R Krajicek	6	6
(Germany) M Stich	3	0
(Australia) M Philippoussis	7	7
13	(United States) J Courier	5	5
11	(Spain) F Mantilla	2	4
(Ukraine) A Medvedev	6	6
(Spain) F Clavet	1	6	1
6	(Spain) C Moyà	6	4	6

Third round
4	(Netherlands) R Krajicek	6	6
(Australia) M Philippoussis	3	2
(Ukraine) A Medvedev	4	6^{3}
6	(Spain) C Moyà	6	7^{7}

Quarterfinals
4	(Netherlands) R Krajicek	6	2	4
6	(Spain) C Moyà	1	6	6

=== Bottom half ===
==== Section 3 ====
First round
(Sweden) M Gustafsson	6^{2}	2
(Czech Republic) B Ulihrach	7^{7}	6
(France) C Pioline	6	6
WC	(Italy) O Camporese	3	4
Q	(Portugal) N Marques	0	0
12	(Spain) Á Corretja	6	6
14	(Spain) A Berasategui	6	7
(Netherlands) P Haarhuis	3	5
Q	(Spain) E Benfele Álvarez	6	3	6
(Morocco) K Alami	3	6	0
(Norway) C Ruud	6	6
(Netherlands) S Schalken	4	2

Second round
5	(Sweden) T Enqvist	5	6	3
(Czech Republic) B Ulihrach	7	4	6
(France) C Pioline	4	3
12	(Spain) Á Corretja	6	6
14	(Spain) A Berasategui	3	6	4
Q	(Spain) E Benfele Álvarez	6	3	6
(Norway) C Ruud	6	2	6
3	(Russia) Y Kafelnikov	4	6	4

Third round
(Czech Republic) B Ulihrach	6	6^{5}	0
12	(Spain) Á Corretja	4	7^{7}	6
Q	(Spain) E Benfele Álvarez	7	6^{3}	1
(Norway) C Ruud	5	7^{7}	6

Quarterfinals
12	(Spain) Á Corretja	6	6
(Norway) C Ruud	2	0

==== Section 4 ====
First round
Q	(Spain) C Costa	6	5	6
(Slovakia) K Kučera	3	7	3
Q	(Italy) D Sanguinetti	2	7^{8}	4
(France) A Boetsch	6	6^{6}	6
(Italy) R Furlan	1	6	7^{7}
9	(Germany) B Becker	6	3	6^{4}
16	(Spain) S Bruguera	6	6
(Spain) J Sánchez	4	1
(Netherlands) J Siemerink	7^{7}	6
Q	(Russia) A Merinov	6^{2}	3
Q	(Spain) F Roig	4	1
WC	(France) F Santoro	6	6

Second round
8	(South Africa) W Ferreira	4	6^{5}
Q	(Spain) C Costa	6	7^{7}
(France) A Boetsch	3	6	6
(Italy) R Furlan	6	4	2
16	(Spain) S Bruguera	6	6
(Netherlands) J Siemerink	4	4
WC	(France) F Santoro	6	7^{7}
2	(Austria) T Muster	2	6^{3}

Third round
Q	(Spain) C Costa	6	7
(France) A Boetsch	4	5
16	(Spain) S Bruguera	6	5	1
WC	(France) F Santoro	3	7	6

Quarterfinals
Q	(Spain) C Costa	3	5
WC	(France) F Santoro	6	7

== Qualifying ==
=== Qualifying seeds ===
1. (Brazil) Gustavo Kuerten (qualified)
2. (Australia) Scott Draper (first round)
3. (Romania) Adrian Voinea (qualifying competition)
4. (Slovakia) Ján Krošlák (first round)
5. (Australia) Richard Fromberg (first round)
6. (Spain) Carlos Costa (qualified)
7. (Spain) Galo Blanco (qualifying competition)
8. (Spain) Emilio Benfele Álvarez (qualified)
9. (Ecuador) Nicolás Lapentti (qualifying competition)
10. (Portugal) Nuno Marques (qualified)
11. (Spain) Francisco Roig (qualified)
12. (Germany) Jens Knippschild (first round)
13. (Russia) Andrei Cherkasov (qualifying competition)
14. (Sweden) Lars Jönsson (qualifying competition)

=== Qualifiers ===
1. (Brazil) Gustavo Kuerten
2. (Russia) Andrei Merinov
3. (Italy) Davide Sanguinetti
4. (Portugal) Nuno Marques
5. (Spain) Francisco Roig
6. (Spain) Carlos Costa
7. (Spain) Emilio Benfele Álvarez

=== Qualifying draw ===
==== First qualifier ====
First round
1	(Brazil) Gustavo Kuerten	6	6
(France) Frédéric Fontang	3	0
(Italy) Daniele Musa	6	3
14	(Sweden) Lars Jönsson	7	6

Qualifying competition
1	(Brazil) Gustavo Kuerten	6	6
14	(Sweden) Lars Jönsson	1	3

==== Second qualifier ====
First round
2	(Australia) Scott Draper	4	6
(Russia) Andrei Merinov	6	7
WC	(Monaco) Sébastien Graeff	2	1
13	(Russia) Andrei Cherkasov	6	6

Qualifying competition
(Russia) Andrei Merinov	6	7
13	(Russia) Andrei Cherkasov	1	5

==== Third qualifier ====
First round
3	(Romania) Adrian Voinea	7	2	7
(France) Arnaud Clément	6	6	5
(Italy) Davide Sanguinetti	2	7	7
12	(Germany) Jens Knippschild	6	6	6

Qualifying competition
3	(Romania) Adrian Voinea	6	4
(Italy) Davide Sanguinetti	7	6

==== Fourth qualifier ====
First round
4	(Slovakia) Ján Krošlák	3	2
(France) Olivier Delaître	6	6
(Netherlands) Fernon Wibier	4	0
10	(Portugal) Nuno Marques	6	6

Qualifying competition
(France) Olivier Delaître	1	2
10	(Portugal) Nuno Marques	6	6

==== Fifth qualifier ====
First round
5	(Australia) Richard Fromberg	1	4
(Italy) Marco Meneschincheri	6	6
WC	(Monaco) Emmanuel Heussner	4	5
11	(Spain) Francisco Roig	6	7

Qualifying competition
(Italy) Marco Meneschincheri	4	5
11	(Spain) Francisco Roig	6	7

==== Sixth qualifier ====
First round
6	(Spain) Carlos Costa	6	6
(Italy) Cristiano Caratti	4	4
WC	(Germany) Daniel Elsner	3	1
9	(Ecuador) Nicolás Lapentti	6	6

Qualifying competition
6	(Spain) Carlos Costa	6	2	6
9	(Ecuador) Nicolás Lapentti	2	6	3

==== Seventh qualifier ====
First round
7	(Spain) Galo Blanco	6	4	6
(Portugal) Emanuel Couto	1	6	2
WC	(France) Sébastien Grosjean	5	4
8	(Spain) Emilio Benfele Álvarez	7	6

Qualifying competition
7	(Spain) Galo Blanco	2	6	1
8	(Spain) Emilio Benfele Álvarez	6	3	6
