= 1998 Monte Carlo Open – Singles =

Singles
- 1998 Monte Carlo Open

Final
- Champion: (Spain) Carlos Moyà
- Runner-up: (France) Cédric Pioline
- Score: 6–3, 6–0, 7–5

Details
- Draw: 56 (7Q / 4WC)
- Seeds: 16

Events
Singles	Doubles
← 1997 ·	Monte Carlo Open	· 1999 →

Carlos Moyá defeated Cédric Pioline in the final, 6–3, 6–0, 7–5 to win the singles tennis title at the 1998 Monte Carlo Open.

Marcelo Ríos was the reigning champion, but did not participate this year.

== Seeds ==
The top eight seeds received a bye to the second round.

1. (United States) Pete Sampras (third round)
2. (Czech Republic) Petr Korda (quarterfinals)
3. (United Kingdom) Greg Rusedski (second round)
4. (Russia) Yevgeny Kafelnikov (third round)
5. (Sweden) Jonas Björkman (second round)
6. (Spain) Álex Corretja (quarterfinals)
7. (Netherlands) Richard Krajicek (semifinals)
8. (Brazil) Gustavo Kuerten (third round)
9. (Spain) Félix Mantilla (first round)
10. (France) Cédric Pioline (final)
11. (United Kingdom) Tim Henman (first round)
12. (Spain) Alberto Berasategui (semifinals)
13. (Australia) Mark Philippoussis (third round)
14. (Spain) Carlos Moyà (champion)
15. (Spain) Sergi Bruguera (second round)
16. (Spain) Álbert Costa (third round)

== Draw ==
=== Key ===
- Q = Qualifier
- WC = Wild card
- LL = Lucky loser
- Alt = Alternate
- SE = Special exempt
- PR = Protected ranking
- ITF = ITF entry
- JE = Junior exempt
- w/o = Walkover
- r = Retired
- d = Defaulted
- SR = Special ranking

=== Finals ===
Semifinals
10	(France) Cédric Pioline	6	0	7^{7}
12	(Spain) Alberto Berasategui	3	6	6^{5}
14	(Spain) Carlos Moyà	4	6	6
7	(Netherlands) Richard Krajicek	6	1	4

Final
10	(France) Cédric Pioline	3	0	5
14	(Spain) Carlos Moyà	6	6	7

=== Top half ===
==== Section 1 ====
First round
(United States) A Agassi	6	6
(United States) T Martin	2	1
(France) F Santoro	6	6
WC	(France) A Clément	2	1
Q	(United States) J Tarango	1	6	5
15	(Spain) S Bruguera	6	1	7
10	(France) C Pioline	6	3	6
(Spain) C Costa	2	6	3
Q	(Ecuador) N Lapentti	2	4
WC	(France) S Grosjean	6	6
(Spain) A Portas	2	1
(Spain) F Clavet	6	6

Second round
1	(United States) P Sampras	6	7
(United States) A Agassi	4	5
(France) F Santoro	6	6
15	(Spain) S Bruguera	3	0
10	(France) C Pioline	6	7^{7}
WC	(France) S Grosjean	1	6^{5}
(Spain) F Clavet	5	5
8	(Brazil) G Kuerten	7	7

Third round
1	(United States) P Sampras	1	1
(France) F Santoro	6	6
10	(France) C Pioline	7^{8}	6
8	(Brazil) G Kuerten	6^{6}	1

Quarterfinals
(France) F Santoro	6	2	4
10	(France) C Pioline	1	6	6

==== Section 2 ====
First round
WC	(Germany) B Becker	5	6	6
(Netherlands) J Siemerink	7	3	1
(Uruguay) M Filippini	6	2	6^{4}
(Sweden) M Norman	2	6	7^{7}
(Spain) J Alonso	6^{9}	6	4
13	(Australia) M Philippoussis	7^{11}	4	6
12	(Spain) A Berasategui	6	7
(Australia) T Woodbridge	0	5
Q	(Spain) J Sánchez	3	6	4
WC	(Czech Republic) D Vacek	6	4	6
(Czech Republic) S Doseděl	7^{7}	6
(Australia) R Fromberg	6^{5}	4

Second round
3	(United Kingdom) G Rusedski	4	6	3
WC	(Germany) B Becker	6	3	6
(Sweden) M Norman	4	3
13	(Australia) M Philippoussis	6	6
12	(Spain) A Berasategui	6	7^{7}
WC	(Czech Republic) D Vacek	0	6^{1}
(Czech Republic) S Doseděl	6	6
5	(Sweden) J Björkman	1	0

Third round
WC	(Germany) B Becker	6	6
13	(Australia) M Philippoussis	1	1
12	(Spain) A Berasategui	3	6	6
(Czech Republic) S Doseděl	6	3	3

Quarterfinals
WC	(Germany) B Becker	7^{7}	5	1
12	(Spain) A Berasategui	6^{4}	7	6

=== Bottom half ===
==== Section 3 ====
First round
(Ukraine) A Medvedev	4	6	7^{9}
(Croatia) G Ivanišević	6	2	6^{7}
(New Zealand) B Steven	3	1
SE	(Italy) A Gaudenzi	6	6
Q	(Spain) G Blanco	6	6
11	(United Kingdom) T Henman	2	4
14	(Spain) C Moyà	6	6
(Austria) T Muster	0	3
(Morocco) H Arazi	6	6
Q	(Spain) J Burillo	4	0
(Sweden) T Johansson	7	6^{10}	3
(Australia) M Woodforde	5	7^{12}	6

Second round
6	(Spain) Á Corretja	7^{7}	6
(Ukraine) A Medvedev	6^{4}	4
SE	(Italy) A Gaudenzi	6	4	6
Q	(Spain) G Blanco	4	6	3
14	(Spain) C Moyà	6	6
(Morocco) H Arazi	1	1
(Australia) M Woodforde	6	2	2
4	(Russia) Y Kafelnikov	4	6	6

Third round
6	(Spain) Á Corretja	7^{7}	6
SE	(Italy) A Gaudenzi	6^{1}	4
14	(Spain) C Moyà	6	6
4	(Russia) Y Kafelnikov	2	3

Quarterfinals
6	(Spain) Á Corretja	3	2
14	(Spain) C Moyà	6	6

==== Section 4 ====
First round
LL	(Spain) J A Viloca	6	6
Q	(Italy) D Nargiso	3	4
(Switzerland) M Rosset	1	0^{r}
(Czech Republic) B Ulihrach	6	3
(Germany) N Kiefer	6	6
9	(Spain) F Mantilla	1	4
16	(Spain) Á Costa	6	6
(Sweden) T Enqvist	1	3
(Sweden) M Gustafsson	6	7
LL	(Morocco) K Alami	3	5
Q	(Netherlands) S Schalken	6	2	4
(South Africa) W Ferreira	4	6	6

Second round
7	(Netherlands) R Krajicek	6	6
LL	(Spain) J A Viloca	4	2
(Czech Republic) B Ulihrach	6	6
(Germany) N Kiefer	4	2
16	(Spain) Á Costa	6	6
(Sweden) M Gustafsson	4	2
(South Africa) W Ferreira	1	3
2	(Czech Republic) P Korda	6	6

Third round
7	(Netherlands) R Krajicek	6	6
(Czech Republic) B Ulihrach	4	0
16	(Spain) Á Costa	7	4	4
2	(Czech Republic) P Korda	5	6	6

Quarterfinals
7	(Netherlands) R Krajicek	4	7^{7}	6
2	(Czech Republic) P Korda	6	6^{1}	1
