= Ricardo Herrera (tennis) =

Mexican tennis player

- Country (sports): Mexico
- Born: 7 November 1967 (age 57)

Singles
- Highest ranking: No. 526 (18 October 1993)

Doubles
- Career record: 0–1
- Highest ranking: No. 405 (10 July 1995)

Ricardo Herrera (born 7 November 1967) is a Mexican former professional tennis player.

Herrera, who played college tennis for San Diego State University, represented Mexico at the 1995 Pan American Games in Mar del Plata, Argentina. He won a bronze medal in the men's doubles event, partnering Mario Pacheco.

His only ATP Tour main draw appearance came in the doubles at the 1995 Mexican Open.
