= Mario Pacheco (tennis) =

Mexican tennis player

- Country (sports): Mexico
- Born: 4 February 1969 (age 56)

Singles
- Highest ranking: No. 453 (1 August 1994)

Doubles
- Career record: 0–1
- Highest ranking: No. 265 (6 March 1995)

Mario Pacheco (born 4 February 1969) is a Mexican former professional tennis player.

Pacheco, who played college tennis for the Louisiana State University, represented Mexico at the 1995 Pan American Games in Mar del Plata, Argentina. He won a bronze medal in the men's doubles event, partnering Ricardo Herrera.

His only ATP Tour main draw appearance came in the doubles at the 1995 Mexican Open.
