= 1998 Abierto Mexicano Telcel – Singles =

Singles
- 1998 Abierto Mexicano Telcel

Final
- Champion: (Czech Republic) Jiří Novák
- Runner-up: (Belgium) Xavier Malisse
- Score: 6–3, 6–3

Events
Singles	Doubles
← 1997 ·	Abierto Mexicano Telcel	· 1999 →

The 1998 Abierto Mexicano Telcel was a men's tennis tournament played on Clay in Mexico City, Mexico that was part of the International Series of the 1998 ATP Tour. It was the sixth edition of the tournament and was held from 26 October – 1 November.

== Seeds ==
Champion seeds are indicated in bold text while text in italics indicates the round in which those seeds were eliminated.

1. (Spain) Félix Mantilla (second round)
2. (Spain) Alberto Berasategui (first round)
3. (Brazil) Gustavo Kuerten (first round)
4. (Spain) Francisco Clavet (semifinals)
5. (Slovakia) Dominik Hrbatý (second round)
6. (Argentina) Mariano Puerta (semifinals)
7. (Brazil) Fernando Meligeni (second round)
8. (Argentina) Franco Squillari (first round)

== Draw ==
=== Key ===
- Q = Qualifier
- WC = Wild card
- LL = Lucky loser
- Alt = Alternate
- ITF = ITF entry
- PR = Protected ranking
- SR = Special ranking
- SE = Special exempt
- JE = Junior exempt
- JR = Junior Accelerator Programme entrant
- CO = College Accelerator Programme entrant
- NG = Next Gen Accelerator Program entrant
- w/o = Walkover
- r = Retired
- d = Defaulted

=== Finals ===
Semifinals
**(Belgium) Xavier Malisse**	**6**	**6**
4	(Spain) Francisco Clavet	2	2
6	(Argentina) Mariano Puerta	3	**7**	3
**(Czech Republic) Jiří Novák**	**6**	6^{1}	**6**

Final
(Belgium) Xavier Malisse	3	3
**(Czech Republic) Jiří Novák**	**6**	**6**

=== Top half ===
First round
1	**(Spain) F Mantilla**	**6**	**6**
(Spain) F Vicente	4	3
**(Belgium) X Malisse**	**6**	**6**
(Spain) Á Calatrava	4	2
**(Costa Rica) JA Marín**	**7**	2	**6**
(Armenia) S Sargsian	6^{7}	**6**	0
**(Spain) JA Viloca**	4	**7**	**6**
8	(Argentina) F Squillari	**6**	6^{2}	4
4	**(Spain) F Clavet**	4	**6**	**6**
(Argentina) M Rodriguez	**6**	3	2
**(Morocco) Y El Aynaoui**	**6**	**6**
(Argentina) M Zabaleta	3	4
**(Italy) D Sanguinetti**	6^{3}	**6**	**7**
(United States) J Courier	**7**	3	5
5	**(Slovakia) D Hrbatý**	**6**	**6**
(Norway) C Ruud	4	3

Second round
1	(Spain) F Mantilla	6^{4}	**6**	**6**
**(Belgium) X Malisse**	**7**	3	3
**(Costa Rica) JA Marín**	**6**	4	**7**
(Spain) JA Viloca	4	**6**	6^{1}
4	**(Spain) F Clavet**	3	**6**	**6**
(Morocco) Y El Aynaoui	**6**	0	4
**(Italy) D Sanguinetti**	**6**	**6**
5	(Slovakia) D Hrbatý	3	3

Quarterfinals
**(Belgium) X Malisse**	**6**	**7**
(Costa Rica) JA Marín	3	5
4	**(Spain) F Clavet**	**7**	**7**
(Italy) D Sanguinetti	6^{1}	5

Semifinals
**(Belgium) X Malisse**	**6**	**6**
4	(Spain) F Clavet	2	2

=== Bottom half ===
First round
6	**(Argentina) M Puerta**	**6**	**6**
(Morocco) K Alami	4	4
**(Argentina) L Arnold**	**6**	6^{3}	**6**
(United States) S Campbell	4	**7**	3
**(Argentina) G Cañas**	**7**	**6**
(Spain) J Alonso	6^{1}	4
**(Mexico) A Hernández**	**6**	**7**
3	(Brazil) G Kuerten	3	5
7	**(Brazil) F Meligeni**	**6**	**6**
(Argentina) M Hood	3	4
**(Spain) J Burillo**	**6**	**6**
(Ecuador) N Lapentti	1	4
**(Czech Republic) J Novák**	**6**	6^{5}	**7**
(Paraguay) R Delgado	4	**7**	6^{4}
**(Mexico) L Lavalle**	**6**	**7**
2	(Spain) A Berasategui	3	6^{3}

Second round
6	**(Argentina) M Puerta**	**6**	**6**
(Argentina) L Arnold	1	2
(Argentina) G Cañas	2	3
**(Mexico) A Hernández**	**6**	**6**
7	(Brazil) F Meligeni	6^{3}	3
**(Spain) J Burillo**	**7**	**6**
**(Czech Republic) J Novák**	**6**	**7**
(Mexico) L Lavalle	3	6^{1}

Quarterfinals
6	**(Argentina) M Puerta**	5	**6**	**6**
(Mexico) A Hernández	**7**	1	4
(Spain) J Burillo	3	**6**	3
**(Czech Republic) J Novák**	**6**	3	**6**

Semifinals
6	(Argentina) M Puerta	3	**7**	3
**(Czech Republic) J Novák**	**6**	6^{1}	**6**
