= 1995 Abierto Mexicano Telcel =

- Date: 27 February – 5 March
- Edition: 3rd
- Category: ATP World Series
- Draw: 32S / 16D
- Prize money: $305,000
- Surface: Clay / outdoor
- Location: Mexico City, Mexico

Champions

Singles
- (Austria) Thomas Muster

Doubles
- (Argentina) Javier Frana / (Mexico) Leonardo Lavalle
← 1994 ·	Abierto Mexicano Telcel	· 1996 →

The 1995 Abierto Mexicano Telcel was a men's tennis tournament held in Mexico City, Mexico. It was the third edition of the tournament and was part of the ATP World Series of the 1995 ATP Tour. It was played on outdoor clay courts and was held from 27 February through 5 March 1995. Thomas Muster won his third consecutive singles title at the event and earned $43,200 first-prize money.

== Finals ==
=== Singles ===
(Austria) Thomas Muster defeated (Brazil) Fernando Meligeni 7–6^{(7–4)}, 7–5

- It was Muster 4th singles title of the year and the 24th of his career.

=== Doubles ===
(Argentina) Javier Frana / (Mexico) Leonardo Lavalle defeated (Germany) Marc-Kevin Goellner / (Italy) Diego Nargiso 7–5, 6–3
