= Mariano Sánchez (tennis) =

Mexican tennis player

- Full name: Mariano Sánchez
- Country (sports): Mexico
- Born: 3 July 1978 (age 46); Cuernavaca, Morelos
- Turned pro: 1996
- Retired: 2001
- Plays: Right-handed
- Prize money: $69,245

Singles
- Career record: 4–1
- Career titles: 0
- Highest ranking: No. 210 (1 March 1999)

Doubles
- Career record: 5–3
- Career titles: 0
- Highest ranking: No. 208 (30 November 1998)

Mariano Sánchez (born 3 July 1978) is a former professional tennis player from Mexico.

== Biography ==
Sánchez, a right-handed player from Cuernavaca, turned professional in 1996. He competed mostly on the Challenger circuit, where he won two doubles titles, but twice appeared in the Mexican Open, a tournament on the ATP Tour. On both occasions he did well, he was a finalist in 1997 with Luis Herrera, then in 1998 made the semi-finals with Leonardo Lavalle.

In Davis Cup competition, Sánchez played in three ties for Mexico. He featured in Mexico's Americas Zone relegation play-off ties against Bahamas and Colombia. In each of the ties he won reverse singles matches, both were in dead rubbers, with Mexico having already lost. His other tie was in the 2000 Davis Cup against Venezuela, in the Americas Zone Group II final. Mexico won the tie 5–0 to secure promotion to Group I, with Sánchez winning both of his singles matches.

== ATP Tour career finals ==
=== Doubles: 1 (0–1) ===
Result	W/L	Date	Tournament	Surface	Partner	Opponents	Score
Loss	0–1	Oct 1997	Mexico City, Mexico	Clay	(Mexico) Luis Herrera	(Ecuador) Nicolás Lapentti (Argentina) Daniel Orsanic	6–4, 3–6, 6–7

== Challenger titles ==
=== Doubles: (2) ===
No.	Year	Tournament	Surface	Partner	Opponents	Score
1.	1998	Puebla, Mexico	Hard	(Mexico) Alejandro Hernández	(Mexico) Bernardo Martínez (Japan) Gouichi Motomura	7–6, 7–6
2.	1998	Toluca, Mexico	Clay	(Mexico) Alejandro Hernández	(Netherlands) Edwin Kempes (Netherlands) Rogier Wassen	6–3, 6–4

== See also ==
- List of Mexico Davis Cup team representatives
