= Bernardo Martínez =

Mexican tennis player (born 1972)

- Full name: Bernardo Martínez Jacques
- Country (sports): Mexico
- Born: 21 August 1972 (age 52)
- Prize money: $28,220

Singles
- Highest ranking: No. 943 (31 August 1992)

Doubles
- Career record: 1–6
- Highest ranking: No. 128 (4 May 1998)

Grand Slam doubles results
- Wimbledon: Q2 (1998)

Bernardo Martínez Jacques (born 21 August 1972) is a Mexican former professional tennis player.

Martínez, a native of Mexico City, competed on the professional tour as a doubles specialist, reaching a best ranking of 128 in the world. He won two doubles titles on the ATP Challenger Tour.

Between 1992 and 1995, Martínez played collegiate tennis for Texas A&M, forming a successful doubles partnership with Mark Weaver. The pair were the 1994 Southwest Conference No. 1 doubles champions.

Martínez has been married to Mexican soap actress Luz Elena González since 2009.

== Challenger titles ==
=== Doubles: (2) ===
No.	Date	Tournament	Surface	Partner	Opponents	Score
1.	July 1997	Quito, Ecuador	Clay	(Mexico) Marco Osorio	(Paraguay) Ramón Delgado (Argentina) Martín García	6–4, 6–4
2.	September 1997	São Paulo, Brazil	Clay	(Brazil) Nelson Aerts	(Brazil) Márcio Carlsson (Brazil) Francisco Costa	6–0, 6–0
