= Daniel Orsanic =

Argentine tennis player

- Country (sports): Argentina
- Residence: Buenos Aires, Argentina
- Born: 11 June 1968 (age 58) Buenos Aires, Argentina
- Height: 1.83 m (6 ft 0 in)
- Turned pro: 1989
- Retired: 2003
- Plays: Left-handed
- Prize money: US$991,800

Singles
- Career record: 14–31
- Career titles: 0; 2 Challenger, 0 Futures
- Highest ranking: No. 107 (15 November 1993)

Grand Slam singles results
- Australian Open: 1R (1994)
- French Open: 1R (1992)
- Wimbledon: 1R (1991, 1993)
- US Open: Q1 (1996)

Doubles
- Career record: 145–170
- Career titles: 8; 10 Challenger, 0 Futures
- Highest ranking: No. 24 (11 May 1998)

Grand Slam doubles results
- Australian Open: 1R (1998, 1999, 2000, 2001, 2002)
- French Open: SF (1997, 2000)
- Wimbledon: 2R (2001)
- US Open: 3R (2000)

Other doubles tournaments
- Tour Finals: RR (2000)

Grand Slam mixed doubles results
- Australian Open: 2R (2000)
- French Open: 3R (1995, 1999)
- Wimbledon: 2R (1997, 2002)
- US Open: 2R (1999)
- Last updated on: 15 July 2022.

Daniel Orsanic (Croatian: Daniel Oršanić, pronounced [dǎniel ǒrʃanitɕ]; born 11 June 1968) is an Argentine former professional tennis player . He was captain of the Argentina Davis Cup team that won the country's first title in 2016.

== Playing career ==
Orsanic was a left-hander with a double handed backhand. He was primarily a doubles specialist with his best tournament results in singles reaching three quarterfinals in 1993 at Buenos Aires and twice in 1994 at Birmingham, Alabama and Båstad.

In doubles Orsanic won eight titles and was a finalist on seven occasions all of these performances were on clay. 1998 was his most successful year with two titles at Mallorca and Kitzbühel and a finalist in Palermo, Mexico City, and Gstaad. His last title came in 2001 Palermo with Spaniard Tomás Carbonell. Orsanic retired as a player at the end of the 2003 season. He is of Croatian descent.

== Coaching career ==
Orsanic was the former coach to Peruvian Luis Horna. He was also the team captain for Argentina when they won the 2007 World Team Cup in Düsseldorf. Orsanic was the former coach of José Acasuso, they separated before Roland Garros. He is now working with the Uruguayan Pablo Cuevas.

== ATP career finals ==
=== Doubles: 15 (8 titles, 7 runner-ups) ===
Legend Grand Slam Tournaments (0–0) ATP World Tour Finals (0–0) ATP Masters 1000 Series (0–0) ATP 500 Series (1–0) ATP 250 Series (7–7)	Finals by surface Hard (0–0) Clay (8–7) Grass (0–0) Carpet (0–0)	Finals by setting Outdoors (8–7) Indoors (0–0)

Result	W–L	Date	Tournament	Tier	Surface	Partner	Opponents	Score
Win	1–0	Aug 1993	San Marino, San Marino	World Series	Clay	(Finland) Olli Rahnasto	(Argentina) Juan Garat (Argentina) Roberto Saad	6–4, 1–6, 6–3
Win	2–0	Aug 1994	Hilversum, Netherlands	World Series	Clay	(Netherlands) Jan Siemerink	(South Africa) David Adams (Russia) Andrei Olhovskiy	6–4, 6–2
Loss	2–1	Sep 1997	Bucharest, Romania	World Series	Clay	(Netherlands) Hendrik Jan Davids	(Argentina) Luis Lobo (Spain) Javier Sánchez	5–7, 5–7
Loss	2–2	Oct 1997	Palermo, Italy	World Series	Clay	(Netherlands) Hendrik Jan Davids	(Australia) Andrew Kratzmann (Czech Republic) Libor Pimek	6–3, 3–6, 6–7
Win	3–2	Oct 1997	Mexico City, Mexico	World Series	Clay	(Ecuador) Nicolás Lapentti	(Mexico) Luis Herrera (Mexico) Mariano Sánchez	4–6, 6–3, 7–6
Loss	3–3	Jul 1998	Gstaad, Switzerland	International Series	Clay	(Czech Republic) Cyril Suk	(Brazil) Gustavo Kuerten (Brazil) Fernando Meligeni	4–6, 5–7
Win	4–3	Aug 1998	Kitzbühel, Austria	International Series	Clay	(Netherlands) Tom Kempers	(Australia) Joshua Eagle (Australia) Mark Kratzmann	6–3, 6–4
Win	5–3	Oct 1998	Majorca, Spain	World Series	Clay	(Argentina) Pablo Albano	(Czech Republic) Jiří Novák (Czech Republic) David Rikl	7–6, 6–3
Loss	5–4	Oct 1998	Palermo, Italy	World Series	Clay	(Argentina) Pablo Albano	(United States) Donald Johnson (United States) Francisco Montana	4–6, 6–7
Loss	5–5	Oct 1998	Mexico City, Mexico	International Series	Clay	(Mexico) David Roditi	(Czech Republic) Jiří Novák (Czech Republic) David Rikl	4–6, 2–6
Win	6–5	May 1999	Munich, Germany	World Series	Clay	(Argentina) Mariano Puerta	(Italy) Massimo Bertolini (Italy) Cristian Brandi	7–6, 3–6, 7–6
Win	7–5	Jul 1999	Stuttgart, Germany	Championship Series	Clay	(Brazil) Jaime Oncins	(North Macedonia) Aleksandar Kitinov (United States) Jack Waite	6–2, 6–1
Loss	7–6	May 2001	Munich, Germany	International Series	Clay	(Brazil) Jaime Oncins	(Czech Republic) Petr Luxa (Czech Republic) Radek Štěpánek	7–5, 2–6, 6–7
Loss	7–7	May 2001	Sankt Pölten, Austria	International Series	Clay	(Brazil) Jaime Oncins	(Czech Republic) Petr Pála (Czech Republic) David Rikl	3–6, 7–5, 5–7
Win	8–7	Sep 2001	Palermo, Italy	International Series	Clay	(Spain) Tomás Carbonell	(Italy) Enzo Artoni (Spain) Emilio Benfele Álvarez	6–2, 2–6, 6–2

== ATP Challenger and ITF Futures finals ==
=== Singles: 4 (2–2) ===
Legend ATP Challenger (2–2) ITF Futures (0–0)	Finals by surface Hard (0–0) Clay (2–2) Grass (0–0) Carpet (0–0)

Result	W–L	Date	Tournament	Tier	Surface	Opponent	Score
Win	1–0	Aug 1989	Goiânia, Brazil	Challenger	Clay	(Cuba) Juan-Antonio Pino-Perez	6–1, 3–6, 6–3
Loss	1–1	Aug 1990	Geneva, Switzerland	Challenger	Clay	(Argentina) Roberto Argüello	3–6, 0–6
Loss	1–2	Nov 1992	Pembroke Pines, United States	Challenger	Clay	(Mexico) Leonardo Lavalle	4–6, 6–7
Win	2–2	May 1993	Ljubljana, Slovenia	Challenger	Clay	(Russia) Andrei Cherkasov	4–6, 6–2, 7–5

=== Doubles: 22 (10–12) ===
Legend ATP Challenger (10–12) ITF Futures (0–0)	Finals by surface Hard (0–5) Clay (10–7) Grass (0–0) Carpet (0–0)

Result	W–L	Date	Tournament	Tier	Surface	Partner	Opponents	Score
Loss	0–1	Jul 1989	Campos do Jordão, Brazil	Challenger	Hard	(Mexico) Stefan Dallwitz	(Brazil) Nelson Aerts (Brazil) Fernando Roese	3–6, 6–7
Win	1–1	Mar 1991	San Luis Potosí, Mexico	Challenger	Clay	(Colombia) Mauricio Hadad	(United States) Scott Patridge (United States) Kenny Thorne	6–4, 3–6, 6–3
Loss	1–2	Aug 1991	Cervia, Italy	Challenger	Clay	(Portugal) João Cunha-Silva	(Argentina) Christian Miniussi (Uruguay) Diego Pérez	3–6, 4–6
Loss	1–3	Apr 1992	Parioli, Italy	Challenger	Clay	(Argentina) Luis Lobo	(United States) Shelby Cannon (United States) Greg Van Emburgh	6–7, 4–6
Loss	1–4	Jul 1992	Salerno, Italy	Challenger	Clay	(Argentina) Gabriel Markus	(Australia) Andrew Kratzmann (Australia) Roger Rasheed	4–6, 3–6
Win	2–4	Jul 1992	Neu Ulm, Germany	Challenger	Clay	(Argentina) Gustavo Luza	(New Zealand) Bruce Derlin (New Zealand) Steve Guy	6–3, 6–2
Loss	2–5	Oct 1992	Cali, Colombia	Challenger	Clay	(Cuba) Mario Tabares	(Germany) Michael Geserer (Brazil) Fabio Silberberg	4–6, 4–6
Win	3–5	Aug 1994	Geneva, Switzerland	Challenger	Clay	(Argentina) Luis Lobo	(United States) Brett Dickinson (New Zealand) Glenn Wilson	1–6, 7–6, 6–4
Loss	3–6	Mar 1996	Salinas, Ecuador	Challenger	Hard	(Italy) Laurence Tieleman	(Venezuela) Juan Carlos Bianchi (Ivory Coast) Claude N'Goran	5–7, 4–6
Loss	3–7	Apr 1996	Puerto Vallarta, Mexico	Challenger	Hard	(Ivory Coast) Claude N'Goran	(United States) Francisco Montana (United States) Jack Waite	2–6, 3–6
Win	4–7	Feb 1997	Punta del Este, Uruguay	Challenger	Clay	(Argentina) Martín Rodríguez	(Brazil) Nelson Aerts (Brazil) Fernando Meligeni	6–2, 6–4
Loss	4–8	Apr 1997	Paget, Bermuda	Challenger	Clay	(Argentina) Lucas Arnold Ker	(Argentina) Javier Frana (The Bahamas) Mark Knowles	3–6, 7–6, 3–6
Win	5–8	May 1997	Ljubljana, Slovenia	Challenger	Clay	(Argentina) Lucas Arnold Ker	(Czech Republic) David Škoch (Netherlands) Fernon Wibier	6–0, 6–4
Win	6–8	Sep 1997	Szczecin, Poland	Challenger	Clay	(Netherlands) Tom Kempers	(Italy) Cristian Brandi (Italy) Filippo Messori	6–3, 7–5
Win	7–8	Nov 1997	Palmer, Puerto Rico	Challenger	Clay	(Argentina) Lucas Arnold Ker	(Argentina) Sebastián Prieto (Argentina) Mariano Hood	7–5, 3–6, 6–3
Win	8–8	Nov 1997	Buenos Aires, Argentina	Challenger	Clay	(Argentina) Diego del Río	(Argentina) Pablo Albano (Argentina) Luis Lobo	6–4, 4–6, 6–1
Loss	8–9	Feb 1999	Laguna Hills, United States	Challenger	Hard	(Argentina) Pablo Albano	(United States) Paul Goldstein (United States) Brian Macphie	6–3, 4–6, 5–7
Loss	8–10	Mar 1999	Salinas, Ecuador	Challenger	Hard	(Argentina) Lucas Arnold Ker	(Argentina) Sebastián Prieto (Argentina) Mariano Hood	2–6, 6–7
Win	9–10	Oct 1999	São Paulo, Brazil	Challenger	Clay	(Brazil) Jaime Oncins	(Argentina) Sebastián Prieto (Argentina) Mariano Hood	6–2, 6–2
Loss	9–11	Nov 1999	Montevideo, Uruguay	Challenger	Clay	(Argentina) Diego del Río	(Argentina) Pablo Albano (Argentina) Martín García	2–6, 3–6
Win	10–11	Oct 2001	Brasília, Brazil	Challenger	Clay	(Argentina) Luis Lobo	(Brazil) Daniel Melo (Brazil) Alexandre Simoni	walkover
Loss	10–12	Sep 2002	Banja Luka, Bosnia & Herzegovina	Challenger	Clay	(Argentina) Juan Pablo Guzmán	(Czech Republic) Jaroslav Levinský (Russia) Yuri Schukin	6–7^{(5–7)}, 5–7

== Performance timelines ==
Key
W	F	SF	QF	#R	RR	Q#	DNQ	A	NH

(W) winner; (F) finalist; (SF) semifinalist; (QF) quarterfinalist; (#R) rounds 4, 3, 2, 1; (RR) round-robin stage; (Q#) qualification round; (DNQ) did not qualify; (A) absent; (NH) not held; (SR) strike rate (events won / competed); (W–L) win–loss record.

=== Singles ===
Tournament	1991	1992	1993	1994	1995	1996	1997	SR	W–L	Win %
Grand Slam tournaments
Australian Open	A	A	A	1R	A	A	A	0 / 1	0–1	0%
French Open	A	1R	Q2	Q2	Q3	A	A	0 / 1	0–1	0%
Wimbledon	1R	Q1	1R	A	A	A	A	0 / 2	0–2	0%
US Open	A	A	A	A	A	Q1	A	0 / 0	0–0	–
Win–loss	0–1	0–1	0–1	0–1	0–0	0–0	0–0	0 / 4	0–4	0%
ATP Masters Series
Miami	A	A	A	A	1R	A	Q1	0 / 1	0–1	0%
Win–loss	0–0	0–0	0–0	0–0	0–1	0–0	0–0	0 / 1	0–1	0%

=== Doubles ===
Tournament	1991	1992	1993	1994	1995	1996	1997	1998	1999	2000	2001	2002	SR	W–L	Win %
Grand Slam tournaments
Australian Open	A	A	A	A	A	A	A	1R	1R	1R	1R	1R	0 / 5	0–5	0%
French Open	A	A	A	A	1R	A	SF	1R	2R	SF	1R	1R	0 / 7	9–7	56%
Wimbledon	Q2	Q1	A	A	A	A	1R	1R	A	1R	2R	1R	0 / 5	1–5	17%
US Open	A	A	A	A	A	1R	A	1R	1R	3R	2R	A	0 / 5	3–5	38%
Win–loss	0–0	0–0	0–0	0–0	0–1	0–1	4–2	0–4	1–3	6–4	2–4	0–3	0 / 22	13–22	37%
Year-End Championships
ATP Finals	Did not qualify									RR	DNQ		0 / 1	1–2	33%
ATP Masters Series
Indian Wells	A	A	A	A	A	A	A	1R	A	1R	1R	A	0 / 3	0–3	0%
Miami	A	A	A	A	2R	A	1R	QF	1R	2R	2R	2R	0 / 7	5–7	42%
Monte Carlo	A	A	A	A	A	A	A	2R	1R	1R	SF	1R	0 / 5	4–5	44%
Hamburg	A	A	A	A	A	A	A	QF	1R	A	QF	A	0 / 3	4–3	57%
Rome	A	A	A	A	A	A	A	1R	1R	2R	2R	A	0 / 4	2–4	33%
Canada	A	A	A	A	A	A	A	A	A	A	1R	A	0 / 1	0–1	0%
Stuttgart	A	A	A	A	A	A	A	A	A	Q2	A	A	0 / 0	0–0	–
Paris	A	A	A	A	A	A	A	A	A	2R	A	A	0 / 1	1–1	50%
Win–loss	0–0	0–0	0–0	0–0	1–1	0–0	0–1	5–5	0–4	3–5	7–6	0–2	0 / 24	16–24	40%

=== Mixed doubles ===
Tournament	1995	1996	1997	1998	1999	2000	2001	2002	SR	W–L	Win %
Grand Slam tournaments
Australian Open	A	A	A	1R	1R	2R	1R	A	0 / 4	1–4	20%
French Open	3R	A	A	2R	3R	1R	A	A	0 / 4	3–4	43%
Wimbledon	A	A	2R	1R	A	1R	A	2R	0 / 4	2–4	33%
US Open	A	A	A	1R	2R	A	A	A	0 / 2	1–2	33%
Win–loss	2–1	0–0	1–1	0–4	2–3	1–3	0–1	1–1	0 / 14	7–14	33%
