= Juan Albert Viloca =

Spanish tennis player (born 1973)

- Country (sports): Spain
- Residence: Miami, United States
- Born: 17 January 1973 (age 52); Barcelona, Spain
- Height: 1.85 m (6 ft 1 in)
- Turned pro: 1992
- Plays: Right-handed (one-handed backhand)
- Prize money: $851,371

Singles
- Career record: 49–80
- Career titles: 0
- Highest ranking: No. 47 (14 July 1997)

Grand Slam singles results
- Australian Open: 1R (1997, 1998)
- French Open: 2R (1997, 1998)
- Wimbledon: 2R (1997)
- US Open: 1R (1995, 1997)

Doubles
- Career record: 1–8
- Career titles: 0
- Highest ranking: No. 204 (3 November 2003)
- Last updated on: 23 September 2021.

Juan Albert Viloca Puig (pronounced [ʒuˈan əlˈβɛɾd biˈlɔkə ˈputʃ]; born 17 January 1973) is a professional tennis player from Spain.

He turned professional in 1992. His favourite surface is clay, surface on which he achieved his both ATP finals in his whole career, although both came in 1997.

Viloca was suspended for two months in 2005 after testing positive for hydroxyprednisolone.

== ATP career finals ==
=== Singles: 2 (2 runner-ups) ===
Legend Grand Slam tournaments (0–0) ATP World Tour Finals (0–0) ATP World Tour Masters 1000 (0–0) ATP World Tour 500 Series (0–0) ATP World Tour 250 Series (0–2)	Titles by surface Hard (0–0) Clay (0–2) Grass (0–0) Carpet (0–0)	Titles by setting Outdoor (0–2) Indoor (0–0)

Result	W–L	Date	Tournament	Tier	Surface	Opponent	Score
Loss	0–1	Jul 1997	Gstaad, Switzerland	International Series	Clay	(Spain) Félix Mantilla	1–6, 4–6, 4–6
Loss	0–2	Oct 1997	Mexico City, Mexico	International Series	Clay	(Spain) Francisco Clavet	4–6, 6–7^{(7–9)}

== ATP Challenger and ITF Futures finals ==
=== Singles: 16 (7–9) ===
Legend ATP Challenger (5–3) ITF Futures (2–6)	Finals by surface Hard (0–0) Clay (7–9) Grass (0–0) Carpet (0–0)

Result	W–L	Date	Tournament	Tier	Surface	Opponent	Score
Loss	0–1	Feb 1995	Mendoza, Argentina	Challenger	Clay	(Belgium) Johan Van Herck	6–7, 1–6
Win	1–1	Aug 1996	Merano, Italy	Challenger	Clay	(Argentina) Lucas Arnold Ker	7–6, 6–4
Win	2–1	Aug 1996	Alicante, Spain	Challenger	Clay	(Slovakia) Branislav Galik	6–3, 7–5
Win	3–1	Aug 1996	Graz, Austria	Challenger	Clay	(Slovakia) Dominik Hrbatý	6–7, 6–2, 6–2
Win	4–1	Aug 1998	Geneva, Switzerland	Challenger	Clay	(Morocco) Younes El Aynaoui	6–3, 6–4
Loss	4–2	Apr 1999	Napoli, Italy	Challenger	Clay	(Spain) Juan Carlos Ferrero	6–3, 6–7, 1–6
Win	5–2	Jun 1999	Eisenach, Germany	Challenger	Clay	(Germany) Tomas Behrend	7–6, 6–4
Loss	5–3	Feb 2003	Spain F2, Algezares	Futures	Clay	(Spain) Salvador Navarro	6–4, 2–6, 5–7
Loss	5–4	Jun 2003	Turin, Italy	Challenger	Clay	(Spain) Óscar Serrano-Gamez	2–6, 2–6
Loss	5–5	Dec 2003	Spain F29, Pontevedra	Futures	Clay	(Spain) Santiago Ventura	2–6, 3–6
Loss	5–6	Apr 2006	Spain F10, Loja	Futures	Clay	(Spain) Pablo Santos González	2–6, 4–6
Loss	5–7	May 2006	Spain F16, Reus	Futures	Clay	(Aruba) Jose-Luis Muguruza	3–6, 6–0, 2–6
Win	6–7	Jan 2007	Spain F2, Calvià	Futures	Clay	(Spain) Javier Genaro-Martinez	2–6, 7–5, 6–2
Win	7–7	May 2007	Spain F17, Lleida	Futures	Clay	(France) Romain Jouan	6–4, 6–3
Loss	7–8	May 2007	Spain F18, Balaguer	Futures	Clay	(Spain) Gabriel Trujillo Soler	7–5, 5–7, 0–6
Loss	7–9	Jun 2007	Italy F19, L'Aquila	Futures	Clay	(Austria) Andreas Haider-Maurer	5–7, 4–6

|}

=== Doubles: 8 (2–6) ===
Legend ATP Challenger (1–2) ITF Futures (1–4)	Finals by surface Hard (0–0) Clay (2–6) Grass (0–0) Carpet (0–0)

Result	W–L	Date	Tournament	Tier	Surface	Partner	Opponents	Score
Loss	0–1	Apr 2003	Sanremo, Italy	Challenger	Clay	(Spain) Joan Balcells	(Italy) Daniele Bracciali (Israel) Amir Hadad	2–6, 4–6
Win	1–1	Jun 2003	Lugano, Switzerland	Challenger	Clay	(Spain) Joan Balcells	(Spain) Álex López Morón (Argentina) Andrés Schneiter	6–4, 6–4
Loss	1–2	Jun 2006	Milan, Italy	Challenger	Clay	(Portugal) Fred Gil	(Italy) Giorgio Galimberti (Israel) Harel Levy	3–6, 3–6
Loss	1–3	Jan 2007	Spain F1, Menorca	Futures	Clay	(Spain) Jordi Marse-Vidri	(Spain) Guillem Burniol (Spain) Adrián Menéndez Maceiras	3–6, 6–7^{(4–7)}
Loss	1–4	Feb 2007	Spain F4, Murcia	Futures	Clay	(Spain) Antonio Baldellou-Esteva	(Spain) Jordi Marse-Vidri (Spain) Carles Poch Gradin	2–6, 1–6
Win	2–4	Mar 2007	Spain F8, Menorca	Futures	Clay	(Spain) Antonio Baldellou-Esteva	(Spain) Jordi Marse-Vidri (Spain) Marc Fornell Mestres	7–6^{(8–6)}, 2–6, 6–3
Loss	2–5	Sep 2007	Spain F33, Oviedo	Futures	Clay	(Spain) Pedro Clar	(Spain) Sergio Pérez Pérez (Spain) Pablo Santos	2–6, 1–6
Loss	2–6	Jan 2008	Spain F2, Mallorca	Futures	Clay	(Bulgaria) Grigor Dimitrov	(France) Julien Jeanpierre (France) Xavier Pujo	5–7, 2–6

== Performance timelines ==
Key
W	F	SF	QF	#R	RR	Q#	DNQ	A	NH

(W) winner; (F) finalist; (SF) semifinalist; (QF) quarterfinalist; (#R) rounds 4, 3, 2, 1; (RR) round-robin stage; (Q#) qualification round; (DNQ) did not qualify; (A) absent; (NH) not held; (SR) strike rate (events won / competed); (W–L) win–loss record.

=== Singles ===
Tournament	1993	1994	1995	1996	1997	1998	1999	2000	2001	2002	2003	2004	SR	W–L	Win %
Grand Slam tournaments
Australian Open	Q1	Q1	A	A	1R	1R	A	A	Q1	A	A	Q2	0 / 2	0–2	0%
French Open	Q2	Q2	Q1	A	2R	2R	Q2	A	Q3	A	A	Q2	0 / 2	2–2	50%
Wimbledon	A	A	1R	A	2R	1R	A	A	A	A	A	Q1	0 / 3	1–3	25%
US Open	Q2	A	1R	A	1R	A	A	A	A	A	A	A	0 / 2	0–2	0%
Win–loss	0–0	0–0	0–2	0–0	2–4	1–3	0–0	0–0	0–0	0–0	0–0	0–0	0 / 9	3–9	25%
ATP Tour Masters 1000
Indian Wells	A	A	Q3	Q1	Q1	1R	A	A	A	Q2	A	A	0 / 1	0–1	0%
Miami	Q1	Q1	Q2	Q2	1R	1R	Q1	1R	Q1	A	A	A	0 / 3	0–3	0%
Monte Carlo	Q1	A	Q1	Q2	A	2R	A	A	Q1	A	A	A	0 / 1	1–1	50%
Hamburg	Q2	A	A	A	A	A	A	A	A	A	A	A	0 / 0	0–0	–
Rome Masters	Q2	Q1	A	A	A	A	A	A	A	A	A	A	0 / 0	0–0	–
Stuttgart	Q1	2R	A	A	A	Q1	Q2	A	A	Not Held			0 / 1	1–1	50%
Win–loss	0–0	1–1	0–0	0–0	0–1	1–3	0–0	0–1	0–0	0–0	0–0	0–0	0 / 6	2–6	25%

== Wins over top 10 players ==
#	Player	Rank	Event	Surface	Rd	Score
1997
1.	(Chile) Marcelo Ríos	9	Gstaad, Switzerland	Clay	2R	6–3, 7–6^{(7–3)}
2.	(Spain) Àlex Corretja	6	Gstaad, Switzerland	Clay	SF	3–6, 7–6^{(7–5)}, 6–4
