= Luis Herrera (tennis) =

Mexican tennis player

Luis-Enrique Herrera
- Country (sports): Mexico
- Born: 27 August 1971 (age 55) Mexico City, Mexico
- Height: 1.70 m (5 ft 7 in)
- Turned pro: 1989
- Plays: Left-handed (one-handed backhand)
- Prize money: $542,438

Singles
- Career record: 53–83
- Career titles: 0; 6 Challenger, 1 Futures
- Highest ranking: No. 49 (9 November 1992)

Grand Slam singles results
- Australian Open: 1R (1991, 1993)
- French Open: 1R (1991, 1993)
- Wimbledon: 3R (1992)
- US Open: 1R (1991, 1992)

Doubles
- Career record: 19–29
- Career titles: 0; 5 Challenger, 0 Futures
- Highest ranking: No. 117 (21 August 1989)

Grand Slam doubles results
- Australian Open: 1R (1991)
- French Open: 2R (1989)
- Wimbledon: 1R (1989)
- US Open: 1R (1989)

Grand Slam mixed doubles results
- Wimbledon: 1R (1989)
- Last updated on: 13 July 2022.

Luis-Enrique Herrera (born 27 August 1971) is a Mexican former professional tennis player.

== Career ==
Herrera was Mexico's national champion in the 12s, 14s and 16s junior events. He partnered Mark Knowles in the Boys' Doubles at the 1989 French Open and they finished runners-up.

He broke into the top 100 for the first time in 1991, after some good performances on the ATP Tour. Herrera reached the semi-final of the Seoul Open and the quarter-final in Washington. En route to the Washington quarter finals he defeated John McEnroe. He also won the gold medal at the 1991 Pan American Games, held in Cuba.

In 1992, he reached the third round of the Wimbledon Championships, having beaten veteran Jimmy Connors in four sets and Japan's Shuzo Matsuoka in five sets. This was the furthest a Mexican had gone at Wimbledon since Raúl Ramírez reached the quarters in 1978. He also made it into the semi-finals of the Manchester Open and along the way defeated second-seed Brad Gilbert, in a close three-set match which was decided in a tie break. However his most successful outing in 1992 came at Búzios, where he reached his only ATP Tour singles final.

Herrera had his third and final Grand Slam win in the 1993 Wimbledon Championships when he came from two sets down to defeat 15th-seed Karel Nováček in the opening round. Soon after he made the semi-finals of the tournament in Newport.

He played a total of 26 singles matches and four doubles matches for the Mexico Davis Cup team, for an overall record of 13–17.

== ATP career finals ==
=== Singles: 1 (1 runner-up) ===
Legend Grand Slam Tournaments (0–0) ATP World Tour Finals (0–0) ATP Masters 1000 Series (0–0) ATP 500 Series (0–0) ATP 250 Series (0–1)	Finals by surface Hard (0–1) Clay (0–0) Grass (0–0) Carpet (0–0)	Finals by setting Outdoors (0–1) Indoors (0–0)

Result	W–L	Date	Tournament	Tier	Surface	Opponent	Score
Loss	0–1	Nov 1992	Búzios, Brazil	World Series	Hard	(Brazil) Jaime Oncins	3–6, 2–6

=== Doubles: 1 (1 runner-up) ===
Legend Grand Slam Tournaments (0–0) ATP World Tour Finals (0–0) ATP Masters 1000 Series (0–0) ATP 500 Series (0–0) ATP 250 Series (0–1)	Finals by surface Hard (0–0) Clay (0–1) Grass (0–0) Carpet (0–0)	Finals by setting Outdoors (0–1) Indoors (0–0)

Result	W–L	Date	Tournament	Tier	Surface	Partner	Opponents	Score
Loss	0–1	Oct 1997	Mexico City, Mexico	World Series	Clay	(Mexico) Mariano Sánchez	(Ecuador) Nicolás Lapentti (Argentina) Daniel Orsanic	6–4, 3–6, 6–7

== ATP Challenger and ITF Futures finals ==
=== Singles: 14 (7–7) ===
Legend ATP Challenger (6–7) ITF Futures (1–0)	Finals by surface Hard (7–2) Clay (0–5) Grass (0–0) Carpet (0–0)

Result	W–L	Date	Tournament	Tier	Surface	Opponent	Score
Loss	0–1	Apr 1990	Mexico City, Mexico	Challenger	Clay	(Mexico) Francisco Maciel	6–2, 6–7, 3–6
Win	1–1	Oct 1990	Manaus, Brazil	Challenger	Hard	(Brazil) Jaime Oncins	6–2, 7–5
Win	2–1	Oct 1990	Ilheus, Brazil	Challenger	Hard	(West Germany) Patrick Baur	6–2, 6–2
Loss	2–2	Nov 1990	Rio de Janeiro, Brazil	Challenger	Clay	(Brazil) Luiz Mattar	3–6, 6–3, 3–6
Loss	2–3	Dec 1991	Puebla, Mexico	Challenger	Hard	(United States) Kent Kinnear	1–6, 5–7
Loss	2–4	May 1992	Acapulco, Mexico	Challenger	Clay	(Mexico) Leonardo Lavalle	6–0, 3–6, 3–6
Win	3–4	May 1992	São Paulo, Brazil	Challenger	Hard	(Brazil) Jaime Oncins	6–2, 3–6, 6–4
Win	4–4	Oct 1992	Ixtapa, Mexico	Challenger	Hard	(Canada) Andrew Sznajder	6–1, 6–2
Win	5–4	Oct 1992	Ponte Vedra, United States	Challenger	Hard	(Peru) Jaime Yzaga	7–5, 6–4
Loss	5–5	Apr 1993	San Luis Potosí, Mexico	Challenger	Clay	(Austria) Horst Skoff	6–2, 2–6, 2–6
Loss	5–6	Apr 1994	San Luis Potosí, Mexico	Challenger	Clay	(Venezuela) Nicolás Pereira	7–6, 2–6, 2–6
Loss	5–7	Sep 1996	Azores, Portugal	Challenger	Hard	(Portugal) Nuno Marques	7–6, 4–6, 4–6
Win	6–7	Nov 1997	Puebla, Mexico	Challenger	Hard	(United States) Wade McGuire	7–6, 4–6, 6–4
Win	7–7	Jun 1999	Mexico F4, Guadalajara	Futures	Hard	(Brazil) Leonardo Silva	6–4, 6–2

=== Doubles: 9 (5–4) ===
Legend ATP Challenger (5–4) ITF Futures (0–0)	Finals by surface Hard (2–2) Clay (3–2) Grass (0–0) Carpet (0–0)

Result	W–L	Date	Tournament	Tier	Surface	Partner	Opponents	Score
Win	1–0	Mar 1988	San Luis Potosí, Mexico	Challenger	Clay	(Mexico) Javier Ordaz	(Mexico) Fernando Pérez Pascal (United States) Agustín Moreno	6–4, 6–1
Win	2–0	Mar 1989	San Luis Potosí, Mexico	Challenger	Clay	(Mexico) Javier Ordaz	(The Bahamas) Mark Knowles (United States) Brian Page	6–4, 6–7, 6–3
Loss	2–1	Apr 1990	San Luis Potosí, Mexico	Challenger	Clay	(Argentina) Guillermo Pérez Roldán	(Mexico) Leonardo Lavalle (Mexico) Jorge Lozano	7–5, 3–6, 2–6
Loss	2–2	Aug 1990	Winnetka, United States	Challenger	Hard	(United States) Doug Flach	(India) Zeeshan Ali (Netherlands) Menno Oosting	6–4, 3–6, 2–6
Win	3–2	Dec 1981	Puebla, Mexico	Challenger	Hard	(Mexico) Oliver Fernández	(United States) Doug Eisenman (United States) Dave Randall	6–4, 7–6
Win	4–2	Apr 1992	San Luis Potosí, Mexico	Challenger	Clay	(Mexico) Leonardo Lavalle	(Mexico) Francisco Maciel (Mexico) Agustín Moreno	6–2, 6–2
Loss	4–3	Apr 1994	San Luis Potosí, Mexico	Challenger	Clay	(Mexico) Ismael Hernández	(Mexico) Leonardo Lavalle (Mexico) Oliver Fernández	5–7, 5–7
Loss	4–4	Aug 1996	Belo Horizonte, Brazil	Challenger	Hard	(Romania) Gabriel Trifu	(Mexico) Leonardo Lavalle (Venezuela) Maurice Ruah	7–5, 4–6, 4–6
Win	5–4	Apr 1998	Puerto Vallarta, Mexico	Challenger	Hard	(Romania) Gabriel Trifu	(Czech Republic) Ota Fukárek (France) Régis Lavergne	6–3, 6–4

== Junior Grand Slam finals ==
=== Doubles: 1 (1 runner-up) ===
Result	Year	Tournament	Surface	Partner	Opponents	Score
Loss	1989	French Open	Clay	(The Bahamas) Mark Knowles	(Australia) Johan Anderson (Australia) Todd Woodbridge	3–6, 6–4, 2–6

== Performance timeline ==
Key
W	F	SF	QF	#R	RR	Q#	DNQ	A	NH

(W) winner; (F) finalist; (SF) semifinalist; (QF) quarterfinalist; (#R) rounds 4, 3, 2, 1; (RR) round-robin stage; (Q#) qualification round; (DNQ) did not qualify; (A) absent; (NH) not held; (SR) strike rate (events won / competed); (W–L) win–loss record.

=== Singles ===
Tournament	1989	1990	1991	1992	1993	1994	1995	1996	1997	SR	W–L	Win %
Grand Slam tournaments
Australian Open	A	A	1R	A	1R	A	A	Q1	A	0 / 2	0–2	0%
French Open	A	A	1R	A	1R	A	A	A	A	0 / 2	0–2	0%
Wimbledon	Q2	1R	1R	3R	2R	A	A	A	1R	0 / 5	3–5	38%
US Open	A	A	1R	1R	A	A	Q3	Q2	Q1	0 / 2	0–2	0%
Win–loss	0–0	0–1	0–4	2–2	1–3	0–0	0–0	0–0	0–1	0 / 11	3–11	21%
ATP Masters Series
Indian Wells	A	A	A	A	1R	A	A	A	A	0 / 1	0–1	0%
Miami	A	A	2R	A	1R	1R	2R	A	Q1	0 / 4	2–4	33%
Canada	A	A	1R	1R	A	A	Q3	A	A	0 / 2	0–2	0%
Win–loss	0–0	0–0	1–2	0–1	0–2	0–1	1–1	0–0	0–0	0 / 7	2–7	22%
