= Francisco Montana =

American tennis player

- Full name: Francisco Montana
- Country (sports): United States
- Residence: Miami, Florida, U.S.
- Born: November 5, 1969 (age 56) Miami, Florida, U.S.
- Height: 6 ft 0 in (1.83 m)
- Turned pro: 1990
- Retired: 2003
- Plays: Right-handed
- Prize money: $1,248,094

Singles
- Career record: 0; 0 Challenger, 0 Futures
- Career titles: 17–37
- Highest ranking: No. 100 (4 May 1992)

Grand Slam singles results
- Australian Open: 1R (1993)
- French Open: 1R (1996)
- Wimbledon: 1R (1992)
- US Open: 1R (1991, 1992)

Doubles
- Career record: 186–173
- Career titles: 10; 11 Challenger, 1 Futures
- Highest ranking: No. 13 (8 June 1998)

Grand Slam doubles results
- Australian Open: 3R (1992, 1997, 1998)
- French Open: QF (1996, 1998)
- Wimbledon: QF (1997)
- US Open: 3R (1997, 1999)

Other doubles tournaments
- Tour Finals: SF (1998)

Grand Slam mixed doubles results
- Australian Open: QF (1995)
- French Open: SF (1998)
- Wimbledon: 2R (1993)
- US Open: 2R (1998)
- Last updated on: 6 March 2023.

Francisco Montana (born November 5, 1969) is a former professional tennis player from the United States. He turned into a professional in 1990.

He reached his career high doubles ranking, world No. 13, on July 8, 1998. Montana reached his career high singles ranking, world No.100, on May 4, 1992.

== Performance timelines ==
Key
W	F	SF	QF	#R	RR	Q#	DNQ	A	NH

(W) winner; (F) finalist; (SF) semifinalist; (QF) quarterfinalist; (#R) rounds 4, 3, 2, 1; (RR) round-robin stage; (Q#) qualification round; (DNQ) did not qualify; (A) absent; (NH) not held; (SR) strike rate (events won / competed); (W–L) win–loss record.

=== Singles ===
Tournament	1991	1992	1993	1994	1995	1996	1997	SR	W–L	Win %
Grand Slam tournaments
Australian Open	A	Q3	1R	A	Q3	Q2	Q2	0 / 1	0–1	0%
French Open	A	A	A	A	A	1R	A	0 / 1	0–1	0%
Wimbledon	Q1	1R	A	Q2	A	A	A	0 / 1	0–1	0%
US Open	1R	1R	A	A	A	A	A	0 / 2	0–2	0%
Win–loss	0–1	0–2	0–1	0–0	0–0	0–1	0–0	0 / 5	0–5	0%
ATP Masters Series
Miami	A	A	A	Q2	Q3	Q1	A	0 / 0	0–0	–
Monte Carlo	A	A	Q2	1R	A	A	A	0 / 1	0–1	0%
Rome	A	A	A	Q1	A	A	A	0 / 0	0–0	–
Canada	A	1R	A	A	A	A	A	0 / 1	0–1	0%
Cincinnati	A	1R	A	A	A	A	Q1	0 / 1	0–1	0%
Paris	A	A	A	Q1	A	A	A	0 / 0	0–0	–
Win–loss	0–0	0–2	0–0	0–1	0–0	0–0	0–0	0 / 3	0–3	0%

=== Doubles ===
Tournament	1991	1992	1993	1994	1995	1996	1997	1998	1999	2000	SR	W–L	Win %
Grand Slam tournaments
Australian Open	A	3R	1R	A	1R	1R	3R	3R	1R	1R	0 / 8	6–8	43%
French Open	A	1R	A	1R	A	QF	1R	QF	1R	3R	0 / 7	8–7	53%
Wimbledon	Q1	1R	1R	2R	1R	1R	QF	3R	1R	A	0 / 8	6–8	43%
US Open	1R	2R	1R	1R	1R	1R	3R	1R	3R	A	0 / 9	5–9	36%
Win–loss	0–1	3–4	0–3	1–3	0–3	3–4	7–4	7–4	2–4	2–2	0 / 32	25–32	44%
Year-End Championships
ATP Finals	Did not qualify						RR	SF	DNQ		0 / 2	2–5	29%
ATP Masters Series
Indian Wells	A	A	A	A	A	A	1R	1R	1R	A	0 / 3	0–3	0%
Miami	A	1R	A	QF	1R	2R	2R	2R	3R	1R	0 / 8	6–8	43%
Monte Carlo	A	A	2R	1R	A	A	W	2R	2R	1R	1 / 6	8–5	62%
Rome	A	A	A	2R	A	A	1R	1R	1R	A	0 / 4	1–4	20%
Hamburg	A	A	A	1R	A	A	A	W	2R	A	1 / 3	0–2	71%
Canada	A	1R	A	A	A	QF	2R	QF	A	A	0 / 4	5–4	56%
Cincinnati	A	A	A	A	A	A	2R	2R	A	A	0 / 2	2–2	50%
Paris	A	A	A	2R	A	A	A	2R	A	A	0 / 2	2–2	50%
Win–loss	0–0	0–2	1–1	5–5	0–1	3–2	8–5	8–7	4–5	0–2	2 / 32	29–30	49%

== ATP Career Finals ==
=== Doubles: 17 (10 titles, 7 runner-ups) ===
Legend Grand Slam Tournaments (0–0) ATP World Tour Finals (0–0) ATP Masters Series (2–0) ATP Championship Series (0–1) ATP World Series (8–6)	Finals by surface Hard (2–2) Clay (8–4) Grass (0–0) Carpet (0–1)	Finals by setting Outdoors (0–0) Indoors (0–0)

Result	W–L	Date	Tournament	Tier	Surface	Partner	Opponents	Score
Loss	0–1	Aug 1992	Los Angeles, United States	World Series	Hard	(United States) David Wheaton	(United States) Patrick Galbraith (United States) Jim Pugh	6–7, 6–7
Win	1–1	Aug 1992	Long Island, United States	World Series	Hard	(United States) Greg Van Emburgh	(Italy) Gianluca Pozzi (Finland) Olli Rahnasto	6–4, 6–2
Win	2–1	Feb 1994	Mexico City, Mexico	World Series	Clay	(United States) Bryan Shelton	(United States) Luke Jensen (United States) Murphy Jensen	6–3, 6–4
Loss	2–2	May 1994	Atlanta, United States	World Series	Clay	(United States) Jim Pugh	(United States) Jared Palmer (United States) Richey Reneberg	6–4, 6–7, 4–6
Win	3–2	Aug 1995	Kitzbühel, Austria	World Series	Clay	(United States) Greg Van Emburgh	(Spain) Jordi Arrese (Australia) Wayne Arthurs	6–7, 6–3, 7–6
Loss	3–3	Oct 1995	Santiago, Chile	World Series	Clay	(United States) Shelby Cannon	(Czech Republic) Jiří Novák (Czech Republic) David Rikl	4–6, 6–4, 1–6
Win	4–3	Mar 1996	Mexico City, Mexico	World Series	Clay	(United States) Donald Johnson	(Venezuela) Nicolás Pereira (Spain) Emilio Sánchez	6–2, 6–4
Win	5–3	Aug 1996	Amsterdam, Netherlands	World Series	Clay	(United States) Donald Johnson	(Sweden) Jacco Eltingh (United States) Paul Haarhuis	6–4, 3–6, 6–2
Win	6–3	Apr 1997	Monte Carlo, Monaco	Masters Series	Clay	(United States) Donald Johnson	(Netherlands) Luke Jensen (Netherlands) Murphy Jensen	7–6, 2–6, 7–6
Loss	6–4	Jul 1997	Stuttgart, Germany	Championship Series	Clay	(United States) Donald Johnson	(Brazil) Gustavo Kuerten (Brazil) Fernando Meligeni	4–6, 4–6
Loss	6–5	Oct 1997	Ostrava, Czech Republic	World Series	Carpet	(United States) Donald Johnson	(Czech Republic) Jiří Novák (Czech Republic) David Rikl	2–6, 4–6
Win	7–5	Feb 1998	Marseille, France	World Series	Hard	(United States) Donald Johnson	(United States) Mark Keil (United States) T. J. Middleton	6–4, 3–6, 6–3
Loss	7–6	Feb 1998	Dubai, United Arab Emirates	World Series	Hard	(United States) Donald Johnson	(India) Mahesh Bhupathi (India) Leander Paes	2–6, 5–7
Win	8–6	Apr 1998	Estoril, Portugal	World Series	Clay	(United States) Donald Johnson	(Mexico) David Roditi (Netherlands) Fernon Wibier	6–1, 2–6, 6–1
Win	9–6	May 1998	Hamburg, Germany	Masters Series	Clay	(United States) Donald Johnson	(South Africa) David Adams (New Zealand) Brett Steven	6–2, 7–5
Win	10–6	Oct 1998	Palermo, Italy	World Series	Clay	(United States) Donald Johnson	(Argentina) Pablo Albano (Argentina) Daniel Orsanic	6–4, 7–6
Loss	10–7	Oct 1999	Bucharest, Romania	World Series	Clay	(Germany) Marc-Kevin Goellner	(Argentina) Lucas Arnold Ker (Argentina) Martín García	3–6, 6–2, 3–6

== ATP Challenger and ITF Futures finals ==
=== Singles: 3 (0–3) ===
Legend ATP Challenger (0–3) ITF Futures (0–0)	Finals by surface Hard (0–1) Clay (0–2) Grass (0–0) Carpet (0–0)

Result	W–L	Date	Tournament	Tier	Surface	Opponent	Score
Loss	0–1	Aug 1991	Segovia, Italy	Challenger	Hard	(Spain) Javier Sánchez	3–6, 2–6
Loss	0–2	Apr 1992	San Luis Potosí, Mexico	Challenger	Clay	(Mexico) Leonardo Lavalle	0–6, 7–6, 4–6
Loss	0–3	May 1994	Budapest, Hungary	Challenger	Clay	(Argentina) Hernán Gumy	4–6, 2–6

=== Doubles: 19 (12–7) ===
Legend ATP Challenger (11–7) ITF Futures (1–0)	Finals by surface Hard (2–2) Clay (9–5) Grass (0–0) Carpet (1–0)

Result	W–L	Date	Tournament	Tier	Surface	Partner	Opponents	Score
Win	1–0	Nov 1990	São Paulo, Brazil	Challenger	Clay	(South Africa) Richard Lubner	(Brazil) Nelson Aerts (Brazil) Danilo Marcelino	6–4, 7–6
Loss	1–1	Apr 1991	Mexico City, Mexico	Challenger	Clay	(United States) Leif Shiras	(Brazil) Ricardo Acioly (Argentina) Pablo Albano	3–6, 3–6
Loss	1–2	Jun 1991	Bielefeld, Germany	Challenger	Clay	(United States) Mark Keil	(Australia) Carl Limberger (Romania) Florin Segărceanu	3–6, 2–6
Win	2–2	Aug 1991	Salou, Spain	Challenger	Clay	(United States) Murphy Jensen	(Australia) Wayne Arthurs (Australia) Carl Limberger	5–7, 6–2, 7–5
Win	3–2	Nov 1991	São Paulo, Brazil	Challenger	Clay	(United States) Greg Van Emburgh	(Spain) Jordi Burillo (Spain) David De Miguel-Lapiedra	3–6, 6–4, 6–1
Win	4–2	Mar 1992	Rennes, France	Challenger	Carpet	(United States) Kenny Thorne	(Czech Republic) Martin Damm (Australia) Sandon Stolle	6–4, 3–6, 6–3
Loss	4–3	Apr 1993	San Luis Potosí, Mexico	Challenger	Clay	(United States) Bryan Shelton	(Mexico) Leonardo Lavalle (Argentina) Javier Frana	3–6, 6–4, 4–6
Loss	4–4	Oct 1993	Curitiba, Brazil	Challenger	Clay	(Austria) Gilbert Schaller	(Portugal) João Cunha-Silva (United States) Jack Waite	6–4, 3–6, 0–6
Win	5–4	Dec 1993	Naples, United States	Challenger	Clay	(United States) Jim Pugh	(The Bahamas) Mark Knowles (United States) Jared Palmer	7–6, 3–6, 6–4
Win	6–4	Jun 1995	Asunción, Paraguay	Challenger	Clay	(Ivory Coast) Claude N'Goran	(Paraguay) Paulo Carvallo (Paraguay) Francisco Rodríguez	6–2, 6–3
Win	7–4	Jun 1995	Cali, Colombia	Challenger	Clay	(Ivory Coast) Claude N'Goran	(Brazil) Otavio Della (Brazil) Gustavo Kuerten	6–3, 3–6, 6–4
Loss	7–5	Jul 1995	Seville, Spain	Challenger	Clay	(Ivory Coast) Claude N'Goran	(Netherlands) Martijn Bok (Belgium) Tom Vanhoudt	2–6, 2–6
Win	8–5	Apr 1996	Puerto Vallarta, Mexico	Challenger	Hard	(United States) Jack Waite	(Ivory Coast) Claude N'Goran (Argentina) Daniel Orsanic	6–2, 6–3
Win	9–5	Apr 1996	Prague, Czech Republic	Challenger	Clay	(United States) Donald Johnson	(North Macedonia) Aleksandar Kitinov (Canada) Sébastien Leblanc	3–6, 6–3, 6–1
Win	10–5	Jun 1996	Eisenach, Germany	Challenger	Clay	(United States) Donald Johnson	(Germany) Karsten Braasch (Germany) Jens Knippschild	6–3, 6–2
Win	11–5	Jul 1996	Tampere, Finland	Challenger	Clay	(United States) Donald Johnson	(Sweden) Ola Kristiansson (Sweden) Mårten Renström	7–5, 7–6
Loss	11–6	Mar 1997	Salinas, Ecuador	Challenger	Hard	(United States) Donald Johnson	(Brazil) Fernando Meligeni (Brazil) André Sá	3–6, 6–3, 3–6
Loss	11–7	Apr 1997	Puerto Vallarta, Mexico	Challenger	Hard	(United States) Jack Waite	(Mexico) Alejandro Hernández (Mexico) Óscar Ortiz	6–4, 2–6, 1–6
Win	12–7	Jun 2002	Mexico F11, Cancún	Futures	Hard	(United States) Alex Bogomolov Jr.	(Argentina) Sebastián Decoud (Cuba) Lazaro Navarro-Batles	walkover
