= Donald Johnson =

American tennis player

- Country (sports): United States
- Residence: Atlanta, Georgia, U.S.
- Born: September 9, 1968 (age 58) Bethlehem, Pennsylvania, U.S.
- Height: 6 ft 3 in (1.91 m)
- Turned pro: 1992
- Plays: Left-handed
- Prize money: $2,294,044

Singles
- Career record: 7–16
- Career titles: 0
- Highest ranking: No. 194 (April 22, 1996)

Grand Slam singles results
- French Open: 2R (1995)

Doubles
- Career record: 318–238
- Career titles: 23
- Highest ranking: No. 1 (January 28, 2002)

Grand Slam doubles results
- Australian Open: SF (2002)
- French Open: QF (1996, 1998)
- Wimbledon: W (2001)
- US Open: F (2001)

Grand Slam mixed doubles results
- Australian Open: SF (2003)
- French Open: QF (1998, 2000)
- Wimbledon: W (2000)
- US Open: F (1999)

Donald James Johnson (born September 9, 1968) is an American former professional tennis player who reached the World No. 1 doubles ranking in 2002. Although born in Bethlehem, Pennsylvania, he was raised and learned the sport of tennis in the Pittsburgh suburb of Mt. Lebanon, Pennsylvania. Johnson attended Fairview High School in Erie, Pennsylvania, where he won the PIAA State Singles Championship in 1984 before transferring to Mt. Lebanon High School, where he won the 1986 WPIAL singles title. During his career, he won the Wimbledon men's doubles title in 2001 (partnering Jared Palmer), and the Wimbledon mixed doubles title in 2000 (partnering Kimberly Po). He also won the doubles title at the Tennis Masters Cup in 2000 (partnering Piet Norval). He won a total of 23 top-level doubles titles.

Prior to turning professional, Johnson played collegiate tennis for the University of North Carolina from 1987 to 1991. As a youngster, he earned the Sportsmanship Award at the USTA National Junior Championships in 1986.

== Grand Slam finals ==
=== Doubles: 1 (1–1) ===
Result	Year	Championship	Surface	Partner	Opponents	Score
Win	2001	Wimbledon	Grass	(United States) Jared Palmer	(Czech Republic) Jiří Novák (Czech Republic) David Rikl	6–4, 4–6, 6–3, 7–6^{(8–6)}
Loss	2001	US Open	Hard	(United States) Jared Palmer	(Zimbabwe) Wayne Black (Zimbabwe) Kevin Ullyett	6–7^{(9–11)}, 6–2, 3–6

=== Mixed doubles: 2 (1–1) ===
Result	Year	Championship	Surface	Partner	Opponents	Score
Loss	1999	US Open	Hard	(United States) Kimberly Po	(Japan) Ai Sugiyama (India) Mahesh Bhupathi	4–6, 4–6
Win	2000	Wimbledon	Grass	(United States) Kimberly Po	(Belgium) Kim Clijsters (Australia) Lleyton Hewitt	6–4, 7–6^{(7–3)}

== Career finals ==
=== Doubles: 35 (23–12) ===
Legend Grand Slam (1) Tennis Masters Cup (1) ATP Masters Series (2) ATP International Series Gold (3) ATP Tour (16)	Wins by surface Hard (13) Clay (6) Grass (3) Carpet (1)

Result	W-L	Date	Tournament	Surface	Partner	Opponents	Score
Win	1–0	Mar 1996	Mexico City, Mexico	Clay	(United States) Francisco Montana	(Venezuela) Nicolás Pereira (Spain) Emilio Sánchez	6–2, 6–4
Win	2–0	Aug 1996	Amsterdam, Netherlands	Clay	(United States) Francisco Montana	(Sweden) Rikard Bergh (United States) Jack Waite	6–4, 3–6, 6–2
Win	3–0	Apr 1997	Monte Carlo, Monaco	Clay	(United States) Francisco Montana	(Netherlands) Jacco Eltingh (Netherlands) Paul Haarhuis	7–6, 2–6, 7–6
Loss	3–1	Jul 1997	Stuttgart Outdoor, Germany	Clay	(United States) Francisco Montana	(Brazil) Gustavo Kuerten (Brazil) Fernando Meligeni	4–6, 4–6
Loss	3–2	Oct 1997	Ostrava, Czech Republic	Carpet	(United States) Francisco Montana	(Czech Republic) Jiří Novák (Czech Republic) David Rikl	2–6, 4–6
Win	4–2	Feb 1998	Marseille, France	Hard (i)	(United States) Francisco Montana	(United States) Mark Keil (United States) T. J. Middleton	6–4, 3–6, 6–3
Loss	4–3	Feb 1998	Dubai, UAE	Hard	(United States) Francisco Montana	(India) Mahesh Bhupathi (India) Leander Paes	2–6, 5–7
Win	5–3	Apr 1998	Estoril, Portugal	Clay	(United States) Francisco Montana	(Mexico) David Roditi (Netherlands) Fernon Wibier	6–1, 2–6, 6–1
Win	6–3	May 1998	Hamburg, Germany	Clay	(United States) Francisco Montana	(South Africa) David Adams (New Zealand) Brett Steven	6–2, 7–5
Win	7–3	Oct 1998	Palermo, Italy	Clay	(United States) Francisco Montana	(Argentina) Pablo Albano (Argentina) Daniel Orsanic	6–4, 7–6
Win	8–3	Apr 1999	Estoril, Portugal	Clay	(Spain) Tomás Carbonell	(Czech Republic) Jiří Novák (Czech Republic) David Rikl	6–3, 2–6, 6–1
Win	9–3	Jul 1999	Gstaad, Switzerland	Clay	(Czech Republic) Cyril Suk	(North Macedonia) Aleksandar Kitinov (Philippines) Eric Taino	7–5, 7–6
Win	10–3	Feb 2000	Mexico City, Mexico	Clay	(Zimbabwe) Byron Black	(Argentina) Gastón Etlis (Argentina) Martín Rodríguez	6–3, 7–5
Win	11–3	Apr 2000	Estoril, Portugal	Clay	(South Africa) Piet Norval	(South Africa) David Adams (Australia) Joshua Eagle	6–4, 7–5
Win	12–3	Jun 2000	Nottingham, England	Grass	(South Africa) Piet Norval	(South Africa) Ellis Ferreira (United States) Rick Leach	1–6, 6–4, 6–3
Loss	12–4	Jul 2000	Stuttgart Outdoor, Germany	Clay	(Argentina) Lucas Arnold Ker	(Czech Republic) Jiří Novák (Czech Republic) David Rikl	7–5, 2–6, 3–6
Loss	12–5	Oct 2000	Toulouse, France	Hard (i)	(South Africa) Piet Norval	(France) Julien Boutter (France) Fabrice Santoro	6–7, 6–4, 6–7
Win	13–5	Oct 2000	Basel, Switzerland	Carpet	(South Africa) Piet Norval	(Switzerland) Roger Federer (Slovakia) Dominik Hrbatý	7–6, 4–6, 7–6
Loss	13–6	Nov 2000	Stuttgart Indoor, Germany	Hard (i)	(South Africa) Piet Norval	(Czech Republic) Jiří Novák (Czech Republic) David Rikl	6–3, 3–6, 4–6
Win	14–6	Dec 2000	Doubles Championship, Bangalore	Hard	(South Africa) Piet Norval	(India) Mahesh Bhupathi (India) Leander Paes	7–6, 6–3, 6–4
Win	15–6	Mar 2001	Acapulco, Mexico	Clay	(Brazil) Gustavo Kuerten	(South Africa) David Adams (Argentina) Martín García	6–3, 7–6
Win	16–6	Mar 2001	Scottsdale, U.S.	Hard	(United States) Jared Palmer	(Chile) Marcelo Ríos (Netherlands) Sjeng Schalken	7–6, 6–2
Loss	16–7	Apr 2001	Estoril, Portugal	Clay	(Federal Republic of Yugoslavia) Nenad Zimonjić	(Czech Republic) Radek Štěpánek (Czech Republic) Michal Tabara	4–6, 1–6
Win	17–7	Apr 2001	Barcelona, Spain	Clay	(United States) Jared Palmer	(Spain) Tommy Robredo (Spain) Fernando Vicente	7–6, 6–4
Win	18–7	May 2001	Majorca, Spain	Clay	(United States) Jared Palmer	(Spain) Feliciano López (Spain) Francisco Roig	7–5, 6–3
Win	19–7	Jun 2001	Nottingham, England	Grass	(United States) Jared Palmer	(Australia) Paul Hanley (Australia) Andrew Kratzmann	6–4, 6–2
Win	20–7	Jul 2001	Wimbledon, London	Grass	(United States) Jared Palmer	(Czech Republic) Jiří Novák (Czech Republic) David Rikl	6–4, 4–6, 6–3, 7–6
Loss	20–8	Aug 2001	Montreal, Canada	Hard	(United States) Jared Palmer	(Czech Republic) Jiří Novák (Czech Republic) David Rikl	4–6, 6–3, 3–6
Loss	20–9	Sep 2001	U.S. Open, New York	Hard	(United States) Jared Palmer	(Zimbabwe) Wayne Black (Zimbabwe) Kevin Ullyett	6–7, 6–2, 3–6
Win	21–9	Oct 2001	Stockholm, Sweden	Hard (i)	(United States) Jared Palmer	(Sweden) Jonas Björkman (Australia) Todd Woodbridge	6–3, 4–6, 6–3
Win	22–9	Jan 2002	Doha, Qatar	Hard	(United States) Jared Palmer	(Czech Republic) Jiří Novák (Czech Republic) David Rikl	6–3, 7–6^{(7–5)}
Win	23–9	Jan 2002	Sydney, Australia	Hard	(United States) Jared Palmer	(Australia) Joshua Eagle (Australia) Sandon Stolle	6–4, 6–4
Loss	23–10	Apr 2002	Miami, U.S.	Hard	(United States) Jared Palmer	(The Bahamas) Mark Knowles (Canada) Daniel Nestor	3–6, 6–3, 1–6
Loss	23–11	Jun 2002	Nottingham, England	Grass	(United States) Jared Palmer	(United States) Mike Bryan (The Bahamas) Mark Knowles	6–0, 6–7, 4–6
Loss	23–12	Jun 2003	s'Hertogenbosch, Netherlands	Grass	(India) Leander Paes	(Czech Republic) Martin Damm (Czech Republic) Cyril Suk	5–7, 6–7

== Doubles performance timeline ==
Key
W	F	SF	QF	#R	RR	Q#	DNQ	A	NH

(W) winner; (F) finalist; (SF) semifinalist; (QF) quarterfinalist; (#R) rounds 4, 3, 2, 1; (RR) round-robin stage; (Q#) qualification round; (DNQ) did not qualify; (A) absent; (NH) not held; (SR) strike rate (events won / competed); (W–L) win–loss record.

Tournament	1989	1990	1991	1992	1993	1994	1995	1996	1997	1998	1999	2000	2001	2002	2003	2004	SR	W–L
Grand Slam tournaments
Australian Open	A	A	A	A	A	2R	3R	1R	3R	3R	1R	A	1R	SF	QF	A	0 / 9	14–9
French Open	A	A	A	A	A	1R	3R	QF	1R	QF	1R	2R	1R	2R	2R	A	0 / 10	11–10
Wimbledon	A	A	A	A	A	1R	1R	1R	QF	3R	2R	2R	W	SF	3R	A	1 / 10	18–9
U.S. Open	A	A	A	A	3R	2R	2R	1R	3R	1R	3R	1R	F	QF	3R	1R	0 / 12	17–12
Grand Slam SR	0 / 0	0 / 0	0 / 0	0 / 0	0 / 1	0 / 4	0 / 4	0 / 4	0 / 4	0 / 4	0 / 4	0 / 3	1 / 4	0 / 4	0 / 4	0 / 1	1 / 41	N/A
Annual win–loss	0–0	0–0	0–0	0–0	1–1	2–4	5–4	3–4	7–4	7–4	3–4	2–3	10–3	12–4	8–4	0–1	N/A	60–40
ATP Masters Series
Indian Wells	NME	A	A	A	A	A	A	A	1R	1R	1R	1R	1R	SF	2R	A	0 / 7	3–7
Miami	NME	A	A	A	2R	2R	A	2R	2R	2R	2R	2R	QF	F	2R	A	0 / 10	12–10
Monte Carlo	NME	A	A	A	A	1R	A	A	W	2R	SF	QF	QF	SF	SF	A	1 / 8	17–7
Rome	NME	A	A	A	A	A	A	A	1R	1R	SF	2R	QF	QF	1R	A	0 / 7	7–7
Hamburg	NME	A	A	A	A	A	A	A	1R	W	2R	2R	A	2R	2R	A	1 / 6	8–5
Canada	NME	A	A	A	A	1R	1R	QF	2R	QF	1R	SF	F	QF	1R	A	0 / 10	13–10
Cincinnati	NME	A	A	A	A	A	A	1R	2R	2R	2R	1R	2R	QF	2R	A	0 / 8	6–8
Stuttgart (Stockholm)	NME	A	A	A	A	A	A	A	2R	2R	1R	F	2R	A	A	A	0 / 5	5–5
Paris	NME	A	A	A	A	A	A	A	2R	1R	A	A	QF	A	A	A	0 / 3	2–3
Masters Series SR	N/A	0 / 0	0 / 0	0 / 0	0 / 1	0 / 3	0 / 1	0 / 3	1 / 9	1 / 9	0 / 8	0 / 8	0 / 8	0 / 7	0 / 7	0 / 0	2 / 64	N/A
Annual win–loss	N/A	0–0	0–0	0–0	1–1	1–3	0–1	3–3	9–8	8–8	9–8	12–8	11–8	14–7	5–7	0–0	N/A	73–62
Year-end ranking	834	–	522	157	100	106	100	42	26	24	36	18	3	10	35	1211	N/A	
