= 1998 ATP Tour =

Men's tennis circuit

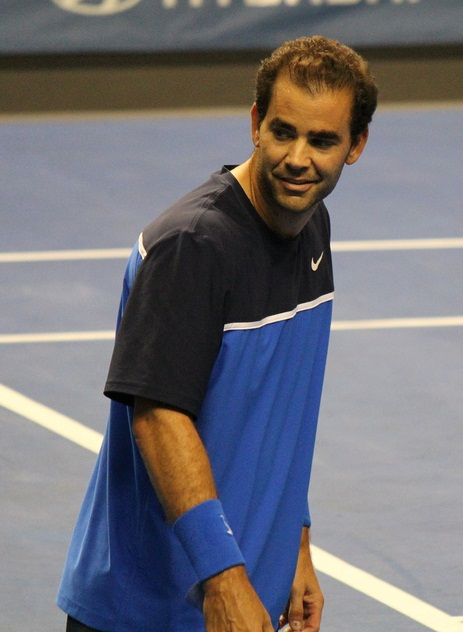
- Pete Sampras finished the year ranked world No. 1 for the record-breaking sixth time in his career. He won four titles during the season, including a major at the Wimbledon Championships.

Details
- Duration: 5 January 1998 – 18 November 1998
- Categories: Grand Slam (4); ATP Super 9 (9); ATP Championship Series (12); ATP World Series (52)

Achievements (singles)
- Most titles: (Chile) Marcelo Ríos (7)
- Most finals: (United States) Andre Agassi (9)
- Prize money leader: (United States) Pete Sampras ($3,926,347)
- Points leader: (United States) Pete Sampras (3915)

Awards
- Player of the year: (United States) Pete Sampras
- Doubles team of the year: (Netherlands) Jacco Eltingh; (Netherlands) Paul Haarhuis
- Most improved player of the year: (United States) Andre Agassi
- Newcomer of the year: (Russia) Marat Safin
- Comeback player of the year: (Morocco) Younes El Aynaoui

The ATP Tour is the elite tour for professional men's tennis organized by the Association of Tennis Professionals (ATP). The ATP Tour includes the four Grand Slam tournaments, the ATP World Tour Finals, the ATP Super 9, the Championship Series and the World Series tournaments.

== Schedule ==
This is the complete schedule of events on the 1998 ATP Tour, with player progression documented from the quarter-final stage.
.

Key

Grand Slam events
ATP Tour World Championships
ATP Super 9
ATP International Series Gold
ATP International Series
Team events

.
.

=== January ===
Week	Tournament	Champions	Runners-up	Semifinalists	Quarterfinalists
5 Jan	Hopman Cup; Perth, Australia; ITF Mixed Teams Championships; Hard (i) – $1,000,000 – 8 teams (RR)	Slovakia; 2–1	France	Round robin (Group A) Spain; Sweden; Australia	Round robin (Group B) Germany; United States; South Africa
5 Jan	Qatar Open; Doha, Qatar; ATP World Series; Hard – $975,000 – 32S/16D; Singles – Doubles	(Czech Republic) Petr Korda; 6–0, 6–3	(France) Fabrice Santoro	(Croatia) Goran Ivanišević (Ukraine) Andrei Medvedev	(United Kingdom) Greg Rusedski (Germany) Bernd Karbacher (United Kingdom) Tim Henman (Netherlands) Sjeng Schalken
5 Jan	Qatar Open; Doha, Qatar; ATP World Series; Hard – $975,000 – 32S/16D; Singles – Doubles	(India) Mahesh Bhupathi (India) Leander Paes; 6–4, 3–6, 6–4	(France) Olivier Delaître (France) Fabrice Santoro	(Croatia) Goran Ivanišević (Ukraine) Andrei Medvedev	(United Kingdom) Greg Rusedski (Germany) Bernd Karbacher (United Kingdom) Tim Henman (Netherlands) Sjeng Schalken
5 Jan	Adelaide International; Adelaide, Australia; ATP World Series; Hard – $315,000 – 32S/16D; Singles – Doubles	(Australia) Lleyton Hewitt; 3–6, 6–3, 7–6^{(7–4)}	(Australia) Jason Stoltenberg	(Australia) Todd Woodbridge (United States) Andre Agassi	(France) Nicolas Escudé (France) Jérôme Golmard (United States) Vincent Spadea (New Zealand) Brett Steven
5 Jan	Adelaide International; Adelaide, Australia; ATP World Series; Hard – $315,000 – 32S/16D; Singles – Doubles	(Australia) Joshua Eagle (Australia) Andrew Florent; 6–4, 6–7, 6–3	(South Africa) Ellis Ferreira (United States) Rick Leach	(Australia) Todd Woodbridge (United States) Andre Agassi	(France) Nicolas Escudé (France) Jérôme Golmard (United States) Vincent Spadea (New Zealand) Brett Steven
12 Jan	Sydney International; Sydney, Australia; ATP World Series; Hard – $315,000 – 32S/16D; Singles – Doubles	(Slovakia) Karol Kučera; 7–5, 6–4	(United Kingdom) Tim Henman	(Australia) Patrick Rafter (Australia) Michael Tebbutt	(United States) Todd Martin (Sweden) Thomas Enqvist (Australia) Jason Stoltenberg (Spain) Albert Costa
12 Jan	Sydney International; Sydney, Australia; ATP World Series; Hard – $315,000 – 32S/16D; Singles – Doubles	(Australia) Todd Woodbridge (Australia) Mark Woodforde; 6–3, 7–5	(Netherlands) Jacco Eltingh (Canada) Daniel Nestor	(Australia) Patrick Rafter (Australia) Michael Tebbutt	(United States) Todd Martin (Sweden) Thomas Enqvist (Australia) Jason Stoltenberg (Spain) Albert Costa
12 Jan	Heineken Open; Auckland, New Zealand; ATP World Series; Hard – $315,000 – 32S/16D; Singles – Doubles	(Chile) Marcelo Ríos; 4–6, 6–4, 7–6^{(7–3)}	(Australia) Richard Fromberg	(Zimbabwe) Byron Black (Spain) Félix Mantilla	(Denmark) Kenneth Carlsen (Germany) Christian Vinck (Slovakia) Dominik Hrbatý (Spain) Carlos Costa
12 Jan	Heineken Open; Auckland, New Zealand; ATP World Series; Hard – $315,000 – 32S/16D; Singles – Doubles	(United States) Patrick Galbraith (New Zealand) Brett Steven; 6–4, 6–2	(Netherlands) Tom Nijssen (United States) Jeff Tarango	(Zimbabwe) Byron Black (Spain) Félix Mantilla	(Denmark) Kenneth Carlsen (Germany) Christian Vinck (Slovakia) Dominik Hrbatý (Spain) Carlos Costa
19 Jan; 26 Jan	Australian Open; Melbourne, Australia; Grand Slam; Hard – $3,140,107 – 128S/64D/32X; Singles – Doubles; Mixed doubles	(Czech Republic) Petr Korda; 6–2, 6–2, 6–2	(Chile) Marcelo Ríos	(Slovakia) Karol Kučera (France) Nicolas Escudé	(United States) Pete Sampras (Sweden) Jonas Björkman (Germany) Nicolas Kiefer (Spain) Alberto Berasategui
19 Jan; 26 Jan	Australian Open; Melbourne, Australia; Grand Slam; Hard – $3,140,107 – 128S/64D/32X; Singles – Doubles; Mixed doubles	(Sweden) Jonas Björkman (Netherlands) Jacco Eltingh; 6–2, 5–7, 2–6, 6–4, 6–3	(Australia) Todd Woodbridge (Australia) Mark Woodforde	(Slovakia) Karol Kučera (France) Nicolas Escudé	(United States) Pete Sampras (Sweden) Jonas Björkman (Germany) Nicolas Kiefer (Spain) Alberto Berasategui
19 Jan; 26 Jan	Australian Open; Melbourne, Australia; Grand Slam; Hard – $3,140,107 – 128S/64D/32X; Singles – Doubles; Mixed doubles	(United States) Justin Gimelstob (United States) Venus Williams; 6–2, 6–1	(Czech Republic) Cyril Suk (Czech Republic) Helena Suková	(Slovakia) Karol Kučera (France) Nicolas Escudé	(United States) Pete Sampras (Sweden) Jonas Björkman (Germany) Nicolas Kiefer (Spain) Alberto Berasategui

=== February ===
Week	Tournament	Champions	Runners-up	Semifinalists	Quarterfinalists
2 Feb	Open 13; Marseille, France; ATP World Series; Hard (i) – $514,250 – 32S/16D; Singles – Doubles	(Sweden) Thomas Enqvist; 6–4, 6–1	(Russia) Yevgeny Kafelnikov	(Sweden) Mikael Tillström (Netherlands) Richard Krajicek	(France) Arnaud Clément (France) Arnaud Boetsch (Sweden) Magnus Gustafsson (Czech Republic) Daniel Vacek
2 Feb	Open 13; Marseille, France; ATP World Series; Hard (i) – $514,250 – 32S/16D; Singles – Doubles	(United States) Donald Johnson (United States) Francisco Montana; 6–4, 3–6, 6–3	(United States) Mark Keil (United States) T. J. Middleton	(Sweden) Mikael Tillström (Netherlands) Richard Krajicek	(France) Arnaud Clément (France) Arnaud Boetsch (Sweden) Magnus Gustafsson (Czech Republic) Daniel Vacek
2 Feb	Croatian Indoors; Split, Croatia; ATP World Series; Carpet (i) – $375,000 – 32S/16D; Singles – Doubles	(Croatia) Goran Ivanišević; 7–6^{(7–3)}, 7–6^{(7–5)}	(United Kingdom) Greg Rusedski	(Switzerland) Marc Rosset (Germany) Martin Sinner	(Czech Republic) Martin Damm (Germany) Rainer Schüttler (Denmark) Kenneth Carlsen (Czech Republic) Jiří Novák
2 Feb	Croatian Indoors; Split, Croatia; ATP World Series; Carpet (i) – $375,000 – 32S/16D; Singles – Doubles	(Czech Republic) Martin Damm (Czech Republic) Jiří Novák; 7–6, 6–2	(Sweden) Fredrik Bergh (Sweden) Patrik Fredriksson	(Switzerland) Marc Rosset (Germany) Martin Sinner	(Czech Republic) Martin Damm (Germany) Rainer Schüttler (Denmark) Kenneth Carlsen (Czech Republic) Jiří Novák
9 Feb	Dubai Tennis Championships; Dubai, United Arab Emirates; ATP World Series; Hard – $1,014,250 – 32S/31Q/16D; Singles – Doubles	(Spain) Àlex Corretja; 7–6^{(7–0)}, 6–1	(Spain) Félix Mantilla	(Sweden) Jonas Björkman (South Africa) Wayne Ferreira	(Spain) Carlos Moyá (Spain) Carlos Costa (Spain) Alberto Berasategui (Germany) Nicolas Kiefer
9 Feb	Dubai Tennis Championships; Dubai, United Arab Emirates; ATP World Series; Hard – $1,014,250 – 32S/31Q/16D; Singles – Doubles	(India) Mahesh Bhupathi (India) Leander Paes; 6–2, 7–5	(United States) Donald Johnson (United States) Francisco Montana	(Sweden) Jonas Björkman (South Africa) Wayne Ferreira	(Spain) Carlos Moyá (Spain) Carlos Costa (Spain) Alberto Berasategui (Germany) Nicolas Kiefer
9 Feb	St. Petersburg Open; St. Petersburg, Russia; ATP World Series; Carpet (i) – $315,000 – 32S/28Q/16D; Singles – Doubles	(Netherlands) Richard Krajicek; 6–4, 7–6^{(7–5)}	(Switzerland) Marc Rosset	(Sweden) Thomas Johansson (France) Cédric Pioline	(Czech Republic) Daniel Vacek (France) Fabrice Santoro (Slovakia) Dominik Hrbatý (Germany) Hendrik Dreekmann
9 Feb	St. Petersburg Open; St. Petersburg, Russia; ATP World Series; Carpet (i) – $315,000 – 32S/28Q/16D; Singles – Doubles	(Sweden) Nicklas Kulti (Sweden) Mikael Tillström; 3–6, 6–3, 7–6	(South Africa) Marius Barnard (South Africa) Brent Haygarth	(Sweden) Thomas Johansson (France) Cédric Pioline	(Czech Republic) Daniel Vacek (France) Fabrice Santoro (Slovakia) Dominik Hrbatý (Germany) Hendrik Dreekmann
9 Feb	Sybase Open; San Jose, United States; ATP World Series; Hard (i) – $315,000 – 32S/16D; Singles – Doubles	(United States) Andre Agassi; 6–2, 6–4	(United States) Pete Sampras	(Netherlands) John van Lottum (United States) Michael Chang	(Australia) Mark Woodforde (United States) Todd Martin (United States) Jan-Michael Gambill (Germany) Tommy Haas
9 Feb	Sybase Open; San Jose, United States; ATP World Series; Hard (i) – $315,000 – 32S/16D; Singles – Doubles	(Australia) Todd Woodbridge (Australia) Mark Woodforde; 6–1, 7–5	(Brazil) Nelson Aerts (Brazil) André Sá	(Netherlands) John van Lottum (United States) Michael Chang	(Australia) Mark Woodforde (United States) Todd Martin (United States) Jan-Michael Gambill (Germany) Tommy Haas
16 Feb	European Community Championships; Antwerp, Belgium; ATP Championship Series; Hard – $875,000 – 32S/16D; Singles – Doubles	(United Kingdom) Greg Rusedski; 7–6^{(7–3)}, 3–6, 6–1, 6–4	(Switzerland) Marc Rosset	(Slovakia) Karol Kučera (Australia) Patrick Rafter	(Czech Republic) Petr Korda (Sweden) Thomas Johansson (Sweden) Magnus Larsson (United States) Jeff Tarango
16 Feb	European Community Championships; Antwerp, Belgium; ATP Championship Series; Hard – $875,000 – 32S/16D; Singles – Doubles	(South Africa) Wayne Ferreira (Russia) Yevgeny Kafelnikov; 7–5, 3–6, 6–2	(Spain) Tomás Carbonell (Spain) Francisco Roig	(Slovakia) Karol Kučera (Australia) Patrick Rafter	(Czech Republic) Petr Korda (Sweden) Thomas Johansson (Sweden) Magnus Larsson (United States) Jeff Tarango
16 Feb	Kroger St. Jude International; Memphis, United States; ATP Championship Series; Hard (i) – $700,000 – 48S/34D; Singles – Doubles	(Australia) Mark Philippoussis; 6–3, 6–2	(United States) Michael Chang	(Chile) Marcelo Ríos (Brazil) Gustavo Kuerten	(South Africa) Grant Stafford (Sweden) Thomas Enqvist (Australia) Mark Woodforde (Australia) Richard Fromberg
16 Feb	Kroger St. Jude International; Memphis, United States; ATP Championship Series; Hard (i) – $700,000 – 48S/34D; Singles – Doubles	(Australia) Todd Woodbridge (Australia) Mark Woodforde; 6–3, 6–4	(South Africa) Ellis Ferreira (Mexico) David Roditi	(Chile) Marcelo Ríos (Brazil) Gustavo Kuerten	(South Africa) Grant Stafford (Sweden) Thomas Enqvist (Australia) Mark Woodforde (Australia) Richard Fromberg
23 Feb	Advanta Championships; Philadelphia, United States; ATP Championship Series; Hard (i) – $589,250 – 32S/16D; Singles – Doubles	(United States) Pete Sampras; 7–5, 7–6^{(7–3)}	(Sweden) Thomas Enqvist	(Germany) Tommy Haas (Canada) Sébastien Lareau	(Netherlands) Sjeng Schalken (United States) Jeff Tarango (United States) Richey Reneberg (South Africa) Grant Stafford
23 Feb	Advanta Championships; Philadelphia, United States; ATP Championship Series; Hard (i) – $589,250 – 32S/16D; Singles – Doubles	(Netherlands) Jacco Eltingh (Netherlands) Paul Haarhuis; 7–6, 6–7, 6–2	(Australia) David Macpherson (United States) Richey Reneberg	(Germany) Tommy Haas (Canada) Sébastien Lareau	(Netherlands) Sjeng Schalken (United States) Jeff Tarango (United States) Richey Reneberg (South Africa) Grant Stafford
23 Feb	Guardian Direct Cup; London, Great Britain; ATP Championship Series; Carpet (i) – $689,250 – 32S/16D; Singles – Doubles	(Russia) Yevgeny Kafelnikov; 7–5, 6–4	(France) Cédric Pioline	(Netherlands) Jan Siemerink (South Africa) Wayne Ferreira	(Slovakia) Karol Kučera (Germany) Marc-Kevin Goellner (United Kingdom) Tim Henman (Australia) Patrick Rafter
23 Feb	Guardian Direct Cup; London, Great Britain; ATP Championship Series; Carpet (i) – $689,250 – 32S/16D; Singles – Doubles	(Czech Republic) Martin Damm (United States) Jim Grabb; 6–4, 7–5	(Russia) Yevgeny Kafelnikov (Czech Republic) Daniel Vacek	(Netherlands) Jan Siemerink (South Africa) Wayne Ferreira	(Slovakia) Karol Kučera (Germany) Marc-Kevin Goellner (United Kingdom) Tim Henman (Australia) Patrick Rafter

=== March ===
Week	Tournament	Champions	Runners-up	Semifinalists	Quarterfinalists
2 Mar	ABN AMRO World Tennis Tournament; Rotterdam, Netherlands; ATP World Series; Carpet (i) – $725,000 – 32S/16D; Singles – Doubles	(Netherlands) Jan Siemerink; 7–6^{(7–2)}, 6–2	(Sweden) Thomas Johansson	(Netherlands) Richard Krajicek (New Zealand) Brett Steven	(Australia) Patrick Rafter (United Kingdom) Greg Rusedski (Belgium) Johan Van Herck (Spain) Tomás Carbonell
2 Mar	ABN AMRO World Tennis Tournament; Rotterdam, Netherlands; ATP World Series; Carpet (i) – $725,000 – 32S/16D; Singles – Doubles	(Netherlands) Jacco Eltingh (Netherlands) Paul Haarhuis; 7–6, 6–3	(United Kingdom) Neil Broad (South Africa) Piet Norval	(Netherlands) Richard Krajicek (New Zealand) Brett Steven	(Australia) Patrick Rafter (United Kingdom) Greg Rusedski (Belgium) Johan Van Herck (Spain) Tomás Carbonell
2 Mar	Tennis Channel Open; Scottsdale, United States; ATP World Series; Hard – $315,000 – 32S/16D; Singles – Doubles	(United States) Andre Agassi; 6–4, 7–6^{(7–3)}	(Australia) Jason Stoltenberg	(Germany) Tommy Haas (Netherlands) Sjeng Schalken	(Canada) Sébastien Lareau (United States) Jan-Michael Gambill (Italy) Andrea Gaudenzi (Spain) Albert Costa
2 Mar	Tennis Channel Open; Scottsdale, United States; ATP World Series; Hard – $315,000 – 32S/16D; Singles – Doubles	(Czech Republic) Cyril Suk (Australia) Michael Tebbutt; 4–6, 6–1, 7–6	(United States) Kent Kinnear (United States) David Wheaton	(Germany) Tommy Haas (Netherlands) Sjeng Schalken	(Canada) Sébastien Lareau (United States) Jan-Michael Gambill (Italy) Andrea Gaudenzi (Spain) Albert Costa
9 Mar	Copenhagen Open; Copenhagen, Denmark; ATP World Series; Carpet (i) – $315,000 – 32S/16D; Singles – Doubles	(Sweden) Magnus Gustafsson; 3–6, 6–1, 6–1	(Germany) David Prinosil	(Netherlands) Jan Siemerink (Denmark) Kenneth Carlsen	(France) Olivier Delaître (New Zealand) Brett Steven (Italy) Gianluca Pozzi (Romania) Andrei Pavel
9 Mar	Copenhagen Open; Copenhagen, Denmark; ATP World Series; Carpet (i) – $315,000 – 32S/16D; Singles – Doubles	(Netherlands) Tom Kempers (Netherlands) Menno Oosting; 6–4, 7–6	(Netherlands) Jan Siemerink (New Zealand) Brett Steven	(Netherlands) Jan Siemerink (Denmark) Kenneth Carlsen	(France) Olivier Delaître (New Zealand) Brett Steven (Italy) Gianluca Pozzi (Romania) Andrei Pavel
9 Mar	Newsweek Champions Cup; Indian Wells, United States; ATP Super 9 Hard – $2,200,000 – 56S/28D; Singles – Doubles	(Chile) Marcelo Ríos; 6–3, 6–7^{(15–17)}, 7–6^{(7–4)}, 6–4	(United Kingdom) Greg Rusedski	(Austria) Thomas Muster (United States) Jan-Michael Gambill	(Ukraine) Andrei Medvedev (Sweden) Thomas Enqvist (United States) Andre Agassi (Czech Republic) Petr Korda
9 Mar	Newsweek Champions Cup; Indian Wells, United States; ATP Super 9 Hard – $2,200,000 – 56S/28D; Singles – Doubles	(Sweden) Jonas Björkman (Australia) Patrick Rafter; 6–4, 7–6	(United States) Todd Martin (United States) Richey Reneberg	(Austria) Thomas Muster (United States) Jan-Michael Gambill	(Ukraine) Andrei Medvedev (Sweden) Thomas Enqvist (United States) Andre Agassi (Czech Republic) Petr Korda
16 Mar; 23 Mar	Lipton Championships; Key Biscayne, United States; ATP Super 9 Hard – $2,450,000 – 96S/64Q/48D; Singles – Doubles	(Chile) Marcelo Ríos; 7–5, 6–3, 6–4	(United States) Andre Agassi	(Spain) Àlex Corretja (United Kingdom) Tim Henman	(United States) Steve Campbell (United States) Jeff Tarango (Sweden) Thomas Enqvist (Brazil) Gustavo Kuerten
16 Mar; 23 Mar	Lipton Championships; Key Biscayne, United States; ATP Super 9 Hard – $2,450,000 – 96S/64Q/48D; Singles – Doubles	(South Africa) Ellis Ferreira (United States) Rick Leach; 6–2, 6–4	(United States) Alex O'Brien (United States) Jonathan Stark	(Spain) Àlex Corretja (United Kingdom) Tim Henman	(United States) Steve Campbell (United States) Jeff Tarango (Sweden) Thomas Enqvist (Brazil) Gustavo Kuerten
23 Mar	Grand Prix Hassan II; Casablanca, Morocco; ATP World Series; Clay – $210,000 – 32S/16D; Singles – Doubles	(Italy) Andrea Gaudenzi; 6–4, 5–7, 6–4	(Spain) Álex Calatrava	(Morocco) Karim Alami (France) Sébastien Grosjean	(Spain) Albert Portas (Spain) Fernando Vicente (Costa Rica) Juan Antonio Marín (Morocco) Hicham Arazi
23 Mar	Grand Prix Hassan II; Casablanca, Morocco; ATP World Series; Clay – $210,000 – 32S/16D; Singles – Doubles	(Italy) Andrea Gaudenzi (Italy) Diego Nargiso; 6–4, 7–6	(Italy) Cristian Brandi (Italy) Filippo Messori	(Morocco) Karim Alami (France) Sébastien Grosjean	(Spain) Albert Portas (Spain) Fernando Vicente (Costa Rica) Juan Antonio Marín (Morocco) Hicham Arazi
30 Mar	1998 Davis Cup First round Bratislava, Slovakia – clay (i); Bremen, Germany – carpet (i); Moinhos de Vento Park, Brazil – clay Zürich, Switzerland – carpet (i); Genoa, Italy – clay Victoria, Australia – grass Brussels, Belgium – clay Atlanta, United States – hard	First-round winners Sweden 3–2; Germany 5–0; Spain 3–2; Switzerland 3–2; Italy 4–1; Zimbabwe 3–2; Belgium 3–2; United States 3–2	First-round losers Slovakia; South Africa; Brazil; Czech Republic; India; Australia; Netherlands; Russia		

=== April ===
Week	Tournament	Champions	Runners-up	Semifinalists	Quarterfinalists
6 Apr	Salem Open; Hong Kong SAR; ATP World Series; Hard – $315,000 – 32S/16D; Singles – Doubles	(Denmark) Kenneth Carlsen; 6–2, 6–0	(Zimbabwe) Byron Black	(Canada) Sébastien Lareau (Sweden) Thomas Johansson	(Italy) Gianluca Pozzi (Spain) Oscar Burrieza (Australia) Sandon Stolle (South Africa) Neville Godwin
6 Apr	Salem Open; Hong Kong SAR; ATP World Series; Hard – $315,000 – 32S/16D; Singles – Doubles	(Zimbabwe) Byron Black (United States) Alex O'Brien; 7–5, 6–1	(South Africa) Neville Godwin (Finland) Tuomas Ketola	(Canada) Sébastien Lareau (Sweden) Thomas Johansson	(Italy) Gianluca Pozzi (Spain) Oscar Burrieza (Australia) Sandon Stolle (South Africa) Neville Godwin
6 Apr	Estoril Open; Oeiras, Portugal; ATP World Series; Clay – $600,000 – 32S/16D; Singles – Doubles	(Spain) Alberto Berasategui; 3–6, 6–1, 6–3	(Austria) Thomas Muster	(Morocco) Karim Alami (Spain) Carlos Moyá	(Spain) Félix Mantilla (Spain) Albert Costa (Costa Rica) Juan Antonio Marín (Spain) Carlos Costa
6 Apr	Estoril Open; Oeiras, Portugal; ATP World Series; Clay – $600,000 – 32S/16D; Singles – Doubles	(United States) Donald Johnson (United States) Francisco Montana; 6–1, 2–6, 6–1	(Mexico) David Roditi (Netherlands) Fernon Wibier	(Morocco) Karim Alami (Spain) Carlos Moyá	(Spain) Félix Mantilla (Spain) Albert Costa (Costa Rica) Juan Antonio Marín (Spain) Carlos Costa
6 Apr	Gold Flake Open; Chennai, India; ATP World Series; Hard – $405,000 – 32S/22Q/16D/3Q; Singles – Doubles	(Australia) Patrick Rafter; 6–3, 6–4	(Sweden) Mikael Tillström	(India) Leander Paes (Australia) Todd Woodbridge	(Germany) Lars Burgsmüller (France) Gérard Solvès (Australia) Mark Woodforde (Romania) Andrei Pavel
6 Apr	Gold Flake Open; Chennai, India; ATP World Series; Hard – $405,000 – 32S/22Q/16D/3Q; Singles – Doubles	(India) Mahesh Bhupathi (India) Leander Paes; 6–7, 6–3, 6–2	(France) Olivier Delaître (Belarus) Max Mirnyi	(India) Leander Paes (Australia) Todd Woodbridge	(Germany) Lars Burgsmüller (France) Gérard Solvès (Australia) Mark Woodforde (Romania) Andrei Pavel
13 Apr	Torneo Godó; Barcelona, Spain; ATP Championship Series; Clay – $825,000 – 56S/28D; Singles – Doubles	(United States) Todd Martin; 6–2, 1–6, 6–3, 6–2	(Spain) Alberto Berasategui	(Spain) Carlos Moyá (Italy) Andrea Gaudenzi	(Russia) Yevgeny Kafelnikov (Slovakia) Dominik Hrbatý (Spain) Carlos Costa (Spain) Sergi Bruguera
13 Apr	Torneo Godó; Barcelona, Spain; ATP Championship Series; Clay – $825,000 – 56S/28D; Singles – Doubles	(Netherlands) Jacco Eltingh (Netherlands) Paul Haarhuis; 7–5, 6–0	(South Africa) Ellis Ferreira (United States) Rick Leach	(Spain) Carlos Moyá (Italy) Andrea Gaudenzi	(Russia) Yevgeny Kafelnikov (Slovakia) Dominik Hrbatý (Spain) Carlos Costa (Spain) Sergi Bruguera
13 Apr	Japan Open Tennis Championships; Tokyo, Japan; ATP Championship Series; Hard – $755,000 – 56S/28D/5Q; Singles – Doubles	(Romania) Andrei Pavel; 6–3, 6–4	(Zimbabwe) Byron Black	(United States) Jan-Michael Gambill (Czech Republic) Daniel Vacek	(United States) David DiLucia (United Kingdom) Tim Henman (Germany) David Prinosil (Germany) Hendrik Dreekmann
13 Apr	Japan Open Tennis Championships; Tokyo, Japan; ATP Championship Series; Hard – $755,000 – 56S/28D/5Q; Singles – Doubles	(Canada) Sébastien Lareau (Canada) Daniel Nestor; 6–3, 6–4	(France) Olivier Delaître (Italy) Stefano Pescosolido	(United States) Jan-Michael Gambill (Czech Republic) Daniel Vacek	(United States) David DiLucia (United Kingdom) Tim Henman (Germany) David Prinosil (Germany) Hendrik Dreekmann
20 Apr	Monte Carlo Open; Roquebrune-Cap-Martin, France; ATP Super 9 Clay – $2,200,000 – 56S/28D; Singles – Doubles	(Spain) Carlos Moyá; 6–3, 6–0, 7–5	(France) Cédric Pioline	(Spain) Alberto Berasategui (Netherlands) Richard Krajicek	(France) Fabrice Santoro (Germany) Boris Becker (Spain) Àlex Corretja (Czech Republic) Petr Korda
20 Apr	Monte Carlo Open; Roquebrune-Cap-Martin, France; ATP Super 9 Clay – $2,200,000 – 56S/28D; Singles – Doubles	(Netherlands) Jacco Eltingh (Netherlands) Paul Haarhuis; 6–4, 6–2	(Australia) Todd Woodbridge (Australia) Mark Woodforde	(Spain) Alberto Berasategui (Netherlands) Richard Krajicek	(France) Fabrice Santoro (Germany) Boris Becker (Spain) Àlex Corretja (Czech Republic) Petr Korda
20 Apr	U.S. Men's Clay Court Championships; Orlando, United States; ATP World Series; Clay – $264,250 – 32S/16D; Singles – Doubles	(United States) Jim Courier; 7–5, 3–6, 7–5	(United States) Michael Chang	(Sweden) Mikael Tillström (Romania) Andrei Pavel	(Brazil) Márcio Carlsson (Australia) Andrew Ilie (Germany) Marcello Craca (Spain) Álex Calatrava
20 Apr	U.S. Men's Clay Court Championships; Orlando, United States; ATP World Series; Clay – $264,250 – 32S/16D; Singles – Doubles	(South Africa) Grant Stafford (Zimbabwe) Kevin Ullyett; 4–6, 6–4, 7–5	(Australia) Michael Tebbutt (Sweden) Mikael Tillström	(Sweden) Mikael Tillström (Romania) Andrei Pavel	(Brazil) Márcio Carlsson (Australia) Andrew Ilie (Germany) Marcello Craca (Spain) Álex Calatrava
27 Apr	Prague Open; Prague, Czech Republic; ATP World Series; Clay – $340,000 – 32S/16D; Singles – Doubles	(Brazil) Fernando Meligeni; 6–1, 6–4	(Czech Republic) Slava Doseděl	(Ecuador) Nicolás Lapentti (Romania) Dinu Pescariu	(Spain) Jacobo Díaz (Spain) Fernando Vicente (Spain) Javier Sánchez (Russia) Andrei Chesnokov
27 Apr	Prague Open; Prague, Czech Republic; ATP World Series; Clay – $340,000 – 32S/16D; Singles – Doubles	(Australia) Wayne Arthurs (Australia) Andrew Kratzmann; 6–1, 6–1	(Sweden) Fredrik Bergh (Sweden) Nicklas Kulti	(Ecuador) Nicolás Lapentti (Romania) Dinu Pescariu	(Spain) Jacobo Díaz (Spain) Fernando Vicente (Spain) Javier Sánchez (Russia) Andrei Chesnokov
27 Apr	AT&T Challenge; Atlanta, United States; ATP World Series; Clay – $315,000 – 32S/16D; Singles – Doubles	(United States) Pete Sampras; 6–7^{(2–7)}, 6–3, 7–6^{(7–4)}	(Australia) Jason Stoltenberg	(Spain) Álex Calatrava (Romania) Andrei Pavel	(Paraguay) Ramón Delgado (United States) Steve Campbell (Argentina) Franco Squillari (United States) Richey Reneberg
27 Apr	AT&T Challenge; Atlanta, United States; ATP World Series; Clay – $315,000 – 32S/16D; Singles – Doubles	(South Africa) Ellis Ferreira (South Africa) Brent Haygarth; 6–3, 0–6, 6–2	(United States) Alex O'Brien (United States) Richey Reneberg	(Spain) Álex Calatrava (Romania) Andrei Pavel	(Paraguay) Ramón Delgado (United States) Steve Campbell (Argentina) Franco Squillari (United States) Richey Reneberg
27 Apr	BMW Open; Munich, Germany; ATP World Series; Clay – $500,000 – 32S/16D; Singles – Doubles	(Sweden) Thomas Enqvist; 6–7^{(4–7)}, 7–6^{(8–6)}, 6–3	(United States) Andre Agassi	(Sweden) Magnus Gustafsson (Spain) Galo Blanco	(Germany) Oliver Gross (France) Nicolas Escudé (Sweden) Tomas Nydahl (Sweden) Jonas Björkman
27 Apr	BMW Open; Munich, Germany; ATP World Series; Clay – $500,000 – 32S/16D; Singles – Doubles	(Australia) Todd Woodbridge (Australia) Mark Woodforde; 6–0, 6–3	(Australia) Joshua Eagle (Australia) Andrew Florent	(Sweden) Magnus Gustafsson (Spain) Galo Blanco	(Germany) Oliver Gross (France) Nicolas Escudé (Sweden) Tomas Nydahl (Sweden) Jonas Björkman

=== May ===
Week	Tournament	Champions	Runners-up	Semifinalists	Quarterfinalists
4 May	ATP German Open; Hamburg, Germany; ATP Super 9 Clay – $2,200,000 – 56S/28D; Singles – Doubles	(Spain) Albert Costa; 6–2, 6–0, 1–0, retired	(Spain) Àlex Corretja	(Slovakia) Karol Kučera (Spain) Félix Mantilla	(France) Fabrice Santoro (Austria) Thomas Muster (Brazil) Gustavo Kuerten (Croatia) Goran Ivanišević
4 May	ATP German Open; Hamburg, Germany; ATP Super 9 Clay – $2,200,000 – 56S/28D; Singles – Doubles	(United States) Donald Johnson (United States) Francisco Montana; 6–2, 7–5	(South Africa) David Adams (New Zealand) Brett Steven	(Slovakia) Karol Kučera (Spain) Félix Mantilla	(France) Fabrice Santoro (Austria) Thomas Muster (Brazil) Gustavo Kuerten (Croatia) Goran Ivanišević
4 May	International Tennis Championships; Coral Springs, United States; ATP World Series; Clay – $245,000 – 32S/16D; Singles – Doubles	(Australia) Andrew Ilie; 7–5, 6–4	(Italy) Davide Sanguinetti	(United States) Justin Gimelstob (Belgium) Johan Van Herck	(France) Sébastien Grosjean (Belgium) Xavier Malisse (Australia) Michael Tebbutt (Paraguay) Ramón Delgado
4 May	International Tennis Championships; Coral Springs, United States; ATP World Series; Clay – $245,000 – 32S/16D; Singles – Doubles	(South Africa) Grant Stafford (Zimbabwe) Kevin Ullyett; 7–5, 6–4	(The Bahamas) Mark Merklein (United States) Vincent Spadea	(United States) Justin Gimelstob (Belgium) Johan Van Herck	(France) Sébastien Grosjean (Belgium) Xavier Malisse (Australia) Michael Tebbutt (Paraguay) Ramón Delgado
11 May	Italian Open; Rome, Italy; ATP Super 9 Clay – $2,200,000 – 64S/32D; Singles – Doubles	(Chile) Marcelo Ríos walkover	(Spain) Albert Costa	(Spain) Alberto Berasategui (Brazil) Gustavo Kuerten	(United States) Michael Chang (New Zealand) Brett Steven (Netherlands) Richard Krajicek (Spain) Fernando Vicente
11 May	Italian Open; Rome, Italy; ATP Super 9 Clay – $2,200,000 – 64S/32D; Singles – Doubles	(India) Mahesh Bhupathi (India) Leander Paes; 6–4, 4–6, 7–6	(South Africa) Ellis Ferreira (United States) Rick Leach	(Spain) Alberto Berasategui (Brazil) Gustavo Kuerten	(United States) Michael Chang (New Zealand) Brett Steven (Netherlands) Richard Krajicek (Spain) Fernando Vicente
18 May	International Raiffeisen Grand Prix; St. Pölten, Austria; ATP World Series; Clay – $400,000 – 32S/16D; Singles – Doubles	(Chile) Marcelo Ríos; 6–2, 6–0	(United States) Vincent Spadea	(Italy) Andrea Gaudenzi (Uruguay) Marcelo Filippini	(Spain) Galo Blanco (Spain) Francisco Clavet (Austria) Thomas Muster (Netherlands) Sjeng Schalken
18 May	International Raiffeisen Grand Prix; St. Pölten, Austria; ATP World Series; Clay – $400,000 – 32S/16D; Singles – Doubles	(United States) Jim Grabb (Australia) David Macpherson; 6–4, 6–4	(South Africa) David Adams (Zimbabwe) Wayne Black	(Italy) Andrea Gaudenzi (Uruguay) Marcelo Filippini	(Spain) Galo Blanco (Spain) Francisco Clavet (Austria) Thomas Muster (Netherlands) Sjeng Schalken
18 May	World Team Cup; Düsseldorf, Germany – clay	(Germany); 3–0	Czech Republic		
25 May; 1 Jun	French Open; Paris, France; Grand Slam; Clay – $5,026,607 – 128S/64D/32X; Singles – Doubles – Mixed doubles	(Spain) Carlos Moyá; 6–3, 7–5, 6–3	(Spain) Àlex Corretja	(Spain) Félix Mantilla (France) Cédric Pioline	(Austria) Thomas Muster (Chile) Marcelo Ríos (Belgium) Filip Dewulf (Morocco) Hicham Arazi
25 May; 1 Jun	French Open; Paris, France; Grand Slam; Clay – $5,026,607 – 128S/64D/32X; Singles – Doubles – Mixed doubles	(Netherlands) Jacco Eltingh (Netherlands) Paul Haarhuis; 6–3, 3–6, 6–3	(The Bahamas) Mark Knowles (Canada) Daniel Nestor	(Spain) Félix Mantilla (France) Cédric Pioline	(Austria) Thomas Muster (Chile) Marcelo Ríos (Belgium) Filip Dewulf (Morocco) Hicham Arazi
25 May; 1 Jun	French Open; Paris, France; Grand Slam; Clay – $5,026,607 – 128S/64D/32X; Singles – Doubles – Mixed doubles	(United States) Justin Gimelstob (United States) Venus Williams; 6–4, 6–4	(Argentina) Luis Lobo (United States) Serena Williams	(Spain) Félix Mantilla (France) Cédric Pioline	(Austria) Thomas Muster (Chile) Marcelo Ríos (Belgium) Filip Dewulf (Morocco) Hicham Arazi

=== June ===
Week	Tournament	Champions	Runners-up	Semifinalists	Quarterfinalists
8 Jun	Gerry Weber Open; Halle, Germany; ATP World Series; Grass – $875,000 – 32S/16D; Singles – Doubles	(Russia) Yevgeny Kafelnikov; 6–4, 6–4	(Sweden) Magnus Larsson	(Netherlands) Paul Haarhuis (Sweden) Thomas Johansson	(Italy) Gianluca Pozzi (Netherlands) Richard Krajicek (Germany) Hendrik Dreekmann (Sweden) Magnus Norman
8 Jun	Gerry Weber Open; Halle, Germany; ATP World Series; Grass – $875,000 – 32S/16D; Singles – Doubles	(South Africa) Ellis Ferreira (United States) Rick Leach'; 4–6, 6–4, 7–6	(South Africa) John-Laffnie de Jager (Germany) Marc-Kevin Goellner	(Netherlands) Paul Haarhuis (Sweden) Thomas Johansson	(Italy) Gianluca Pozzi (Netherlands) Richard Krajicek (Germany) Hendrik Dreekmann (Sweden) Magnus Norman
8 Jun	Stella Artois Championships; London, Great Britain; ATP World Series; Grass – $725,000 – 56S/64Q/28D; Singles – Doubles	(Australia) Scott Draper; 7–6^{(7–5)}, 6–4	(Italy) Laurence Tieleman	(Australia) Mark Woodforde (Zimbabwe) Byron Black	(Sweden) Thomas Enqvist (United States) Doug Flach (United States) Brian MacPhie (United Kingdom) Tim Henman
8 Jun	Stella Artois Championships; London, Great Britain; ATP World Series; Grass – $725,000 – 56S/64Q/28D; Singles – Doubles	(Australia) Todd Woodbridge / (Australia) Mark Woodforde vs. (Sweden) Jonas Björkman / (Australia) Patrick Rafter – cancelled		(Australia) Mark Woodforde (Zimbabwe) Byron Black	(Sweden) Thomas Enqvist (United States) Doug Flach (United States) Brian MacPhie (United Kingdom) Tim Henman
8 Jun	Internazionali di Carisbo; Bologna, Italy; ATP World Series; Clay – $315,000 – 32S/19Q/16D; Singles – Doubles	(Spain) Julian Alonso; 6–1, 6–4	(Morocco) Karim Alami	(Costa Rica) Juan Antonio Marín (Slovakia) Dominik Hrbatý	(Argentina) Mariano Puerta (Spain) Carlos Costa (Italy) Marzio Martelli (Argentina) Franco Squillari
8 Jun	Internazionali di Carisbo; Bologna, Italy; ATP World Series; Clay – $315,000 – 32S/19Q/16D; Singles – Doubles	(United States) Brandon Coupe (South Africa) Paul Rosner; 7–6, 6–3	(Italy) Giorgio Galimberti (Italy) Massimo Valeri	(Costa Rica) Juan Antonio Marín (Slovakia) Dominik Hrbatý	(Argentina) Mariano Puerta (Spain) Carlos Costa (Italy) Marzio Martelli (Argentina) Franco Squillari
15 Jun	Heineken Trophy 's-Hertogenbosch, Netherlands; ATP World Series; Grass – $475,000 – 32S/25Q/16D; Singles – Doubles	(Australia) Patrick Rafter; 7–6^{(7–2)}, 6–2	(Czech Republic) Martin Damm	(Netherlands) Dennis van Scheppingen (Netherlands) Jan Siemerink	(Netherlands) Sjeng Schalken (Netherlands) Richard Krajicek (Slovakia) Karol Kučera (United States) Steve Campbell
15 Jun	Heineken Trophy 's-Hertogenbosch, Netherlands; ATP World Series; Grass – $475,000 – 32S/25Q/16D; Singles – Doubles	(France) Guillaume Raoux (Netherlands) Jan Siemerink; 7–6^{(7–5)}, 6–2	(Australia) Joshua Eagle (Australia) Andrew Florent	(Netherlands) Dennis van Scheppingen (Netherlands) Jan Siemerink	(Netherlands) Sjeng Schalken (Netherlands) Richard Krajicek (Slovakia) Karol Kučera (United States) Steve Campbell
15 Jun	Nottingham Open; Nottingham, Great Britain; ATP World Series; Grass – $315,000 – 32S/16D; Singles – Doubles	(Sweden) Jonas Björkman; 6–3, 6–2	(Zimbabwe) Byron Black	(Armenia) Sargis Sargsian (France) Jérôme Golmard	(Italy) Gianluca Pozzi (New Zealand) Brett Steven (Australia) Scott Draper (Germany) David Prinosil
15 Jun	Nottingham Open; Nottingham, Great Britain; ATP World Series; Grass – $315,000 – 32S/16D; Singles – Doubles	(United States) Justin Gimelstob (South Africa) Byron Talbot; 7–5, 6–7, 6–4	(Canada) Sébastien Lareau (Canada) Daniel Nestor	(Armenia) Sargis Sargsian (France) Jérôme Golmard	(Italy) Gianluca Pozzi (New Zealand) Brett Steven (Australia) Scott Draper (Germany) David Prinosil
22 Jun; 29 Jun	Wimbledon Championships; London, Great Britain; Grand Slam; Grass – $5,638,006 – 128S/64D/32X; Singles – Doubles; Mixed doubles	(United States) Pete Sampras; 6–7^{(2–7)}, 7–6^{(11–9)}, 6–4, 3–6, 6–2	(Croatia) Goran Ivanišević	(United Kingdom) Tim Henman (Netherlands) Richard Krajicek	(Australia) Mark Philippoussis (Czech Republic) Petr Korda (Netherlands) Jan Siemerink (Italy) Davide Sanguinetti
22 Jun; 29 Jun	Wimbledon Championships; London, Great Britain; Grand Slam; Grass – $5,638,006 – 128S/64D/32X; Singles – Doubles; Mixed doubles	(Netherlands) Jacco Eltingh (Netherlands) Paul Haarhuis; 2–6, 6–4, 7–6^{(7–3)}, 5–7, 10–8	(Australia) Todd Woodbridge (Australia) Mark Woodforde	(United Kingdom) Tim Henman (Netherlands) Richard Krajicek	(Australia) Mark Philippoussis (Czech Republic) Petr Korda (Netherlands) Jan Siemerink (Italy) Davide Sanguinetti
22 Jun; 29 Jun	Wimbledon Championships; London, Great Britain; Grand Slam; Grass – $5,638,006 – 128S/64D/32X; Singles – Doubles; Mixed doubles	(Belarus) Max Mirnyi (United States) Serena Williams; 6–4, 6–4	(India) Mahesh Bhupathi (Croatia) Mirjana Lučić	(United Kingdom) Tim Henman (Netherlands) Richard Krajicek	(Australia) Mark Philippoussis (Czech Republic) Petr Korda (Netherlands) Jan Siemerink (Italy) Davide Sanguinetti

=== July ===
Week	Tournament	Champions	Runners-up	Semifinalists	Quarterfinalists
6 Jul	Rado Open; Gstaad, Switzerland; ATP World Series; Clay – $525,000 – 32S/16D; Singles – Doubles	(Spain) Àlex Corretja; 7–6^{(7–5)}, 7–5, 6–3	(Germany) Boris Becker	(Chile) Marcelo Ríos (Belgium) Filip Dewulf	(Spain) Francisco Clavet (Spain) Félix Mantilla (Spain) Albert Costa (Germany) Nicolas Kiefer
6 Jul	Rado Open; Gstaad, Switzerland; ATP World Series; Clay – $525,000 – 32S/16D; Singles – Doubles	(Brazil) Gustavo Kuerten (Brazil) Fernando Meligeni; 6–4, 7–5	(Argentina) Daniel Orsanic (Czech Republic) Cyril Suk	(Chile) Marcelo Ríos (Belgium) Filip Dewulf	(Spain) Francisco Clavet (Spain) Félix Mantilla (Spain) Albert Costa (Germany) Nicolas Kiefer
6 Jul	Miller Lite Hall of Fame Tennis Championships; Newport, United States; ATP World Series; Grass – $275,000 – 32S/16D; Singles – Doubles	(India) Leander Paes; 6–3, 6–2	(South Africa) Neville Godwin	(Australia) Jason Stoltenberg (Italy) Laurence Tieleman	(Netherlands) John van Lottum (United States) Justin Gimelstob (Germany) Rainer Schüttler (The Bahamas) Mark Knowles
6 Jul	Miller Lite Hall of Fame Tennis Championships; Newport, United States; ATP World Series; Grass – $275,000 – 32S/16D; Singles – Doubles	(United States) Doug Flach (Australia) Sandon Stolle; 6–2, 4–6, 7–6	(Australia) Scott Draper (Australia) Jason Stoltenberg	(Australia) Jason Stoltenberg (Italy) Laurence Tieleman	(Netherlands) John van Lottum (United States) Justin Gimelstob (Germany) Rainer Schüttler (The Bahamas) Mark Knowles
6 Jul	Investor Swedish Open; Båstad, Sweden; ATP World Series; Clay – $315,000 – 32S/16D; Singles – Doubles	(Sweden) Magnus Gustafsson; 6–2, 6–3	(Ukraine) Andrei Medvedev	(Sweden) Thomas Johansson (Slovakia) Dominik Hrbatý	(France) Jérôme Golmard (Morocco) Karim Alami (Italy) Andrea Gaudenzi (Czech Republic) Jiří Novák
6 Jul	Investor Swedish Open; Båstad, Sweden; ATP World Series; Clay – $315,000 – 32S/16D; Singles – Doubles	(Sweden) Magnus Gustafsson (Sweden) Magnus Larsson; 6–4, 6–2	(South Africa) Lan Bale (South Africa) Piet Norval	(Sweden) Thomas Johansson (Slovakia) Dominik Hrbatý	(France) Jérôme Golmard (Morocco) Karim Alami (Italy) Andrea Gaudenzi (Czech Republic) Jiří Novák
13 Jul	1998 Davis Cup Quarterfinals; Hamburg, Germany – hard A Coruña, Spain – clay Prato, Italy – clay Indianapolis, United States – hard	Quarterfinal winners Sweden 3–2; Spain 4–1; Italy 5–0; United States 4–1	Quarterfinal losers Germany; Switzerland; Zimbabwe; Belgium		
20 Jul	Mercedes Cup; Stuttgart, Germany; ATP Championship Series; Clay – $915,000 – 48S/24D; Singles – Doubles	(Brazil) Gustavo Kuerten; 4–6, 6–2, 6–4	(Slovakia) Karol Kučera	(Chile) Marcelo Ríos (Spain) Carlos Moyá	(Germany) Boris Becker (Czech Republic) Bohdan Ulihrach (Spain) Albert Costa (Spain) Fernando Vicente
20 Jul	Mercedes Cup; Stuttgart, Germany; ATP Championship Series; Clay – $915,000 – 48S/24D; Singles – Doubles	(France) Olivier Delaître (France) Fabrice Santoro; 6–1, 3–6, 6–3	(Australia) Joshua Eagle (United States) Jim Grabb	(Chile) Marcelo Ríos (Spain) Carlos Moyá	(Germany) Boris Becker (Czech Republic) Bohdan Ulihrach (Spain) Albert Costa (Spain) Fernando Vicente
20 Jul	Legg Mason Tennis Classic; Washington, D.C., United States; ATP Championship Series; Hard – $575,000 – 58S/28D; Singles – Doubles	(United States) Andre Agassi; 6–2, 6–0	(Australia) Scott Draper	(United States) Michael Chang (South Africa) Wayne Ferreira	(United States) Jim Courier (Belgium) Filip Dewulf (United States) Vincent Spadea (Canada) Sébastien Lareau
20 Jul	Legg Mason Tennis Classic; Washington, D.C., United States; ATP Championship Series; Hard – $575,000 – 58S/28D; Singles – Doubles	(South Africa) Grant Stafford (Zimbabwe) Kevin Ullyett; 6–2, 6–4	(South Africa) Wayne Ferreira (United States) Patrick Galbraith	(United States) Michael Chang (South Africa) Wayne Ferreira	(United States) Jim Courier (Belgium) Filip Dewulf (United States) Vincent Spadea (Canada) Sébastien Lareau
27 Jul	Mercedes-Benz Cup; Los Angeles, United States; ATP World Series; Hard – $315,000 – 32S/16D; Singles – Doubles	(United States) Andre Agassi; 6–4, 6–4	(United Kingdom) Tim Henman	(United States) Justin Gimelstob (France) Guillaume Raoux	(Australia) Patrick Rafter (Australia) Sandon Stolle (United States) Michael Joyce (Zimbabwe) Byron Black
27 Jul	Mercedes-Benz Cup; Los Angeles, United States; ATP World Series; Hard – $315,000 – 32S/16D; Singles – Doubles	(Australia) Patrick Rafter (Australia) Sandon Stolle; 6–4, 6–4	(United States) Jeff Tarango (Czech Republic) Daniel Vacek	(United States) Justin Gimelstob (France) Guillaume Raoux	(Australia) Patrick Rafter (Australia) Sandon Stolle (United States) Michael Joyce (Zimbabwe) Byron Black
27 Jul	Croatia Open Umag; Umag, Croatia; ATP World Series; Clay – $375,000 – 32S/16D; Singles – Doubles	(Czech Republic) Bohdan Ulihrach; 6–3, 7–6^{(7–0)}	(Sweden) Magnus Norman	(Costa Rica) Juan Antonio Marín (Argentina) Mariano Puerta	(Netherlands) Paul Haarhuis (Slovakia) Karol Kučera (Brazil) Gustavo Kuerten (Spain) Félix Mantilla
27 Jul	Croatia Open Umag; Umag, Croatia; ATP World Series; Clay – $375,000 – 32S/16D; Singles – Doubles	(United Kingdom) Neil Broad (South Africa) Piet Norval; 6–1, 3–6, 6–3	(Czech Republic) Jiří Novák (Czech Republic) David Rikl	(Costa Rica) Juan Antonio Marín (Argentina) Mariano Puerta	(Netherlands) Paul Haarhuis (Slovakia) Karol Kučera (Brazil) Gustavo Kuerten (Spain) Félix Mantilla
27 Jul	Generali Open; Kitzbühel, Austria; ATP World Series; Clay – $500,000 – 48S/28D; Singles – Doubles	(Spain) Albert Costa; 6–2, 1–6, 6–2, 3–6, 6–1	(Italy) Andrea Gaudenzi	(Argentina) Franco Squillari (Spain) Francisco Clavet	(Australia) Richard Fromberg (Belgium) Filip Dewulf (Brazil) Fernando Meligeni (Ecuador) Nicolás Lapentti
27 Jul	Generali Open; Kitzbühel, Austria; ATP World Series; Clay – $500,000 – 48S/28D; Singles – Doubles	(Netherlands) Tom Kempers (Argentina) Daniel Orsanic; 6–3, 6–4	(Australia) Joshua Eagle (Australia) Andrew Kratzmann	(Argentina) Franco Squillari (Spain) Francisco Clavet	(Australia) Richard Fromberg (Belgium) Filip Dewulf (Brazil) Fernando Meligeni (Ecuador) Nicolás Lapentti

=== August ===
Week	Tournament	Champions	Runners-up	Semifinalists	Quarterfinalists
3 Aug	du Maurier Open; Toronto, Ontario, Canada; ATP Super 9 Hard – $2,200,000 – 56S/28Q/28D; Singles – Doubles	(Australia) Patrick Rafter; 7–6^{(7–3)}, 6–4	(Netherlands) Richard Krajicek	(United States) Andre Agassi (United Kingdom) Tim Henman	(United States) Pete Sampras (Russia) Yevgeny Kafelnikov (Sweden) Jonas Björkman (Czech Republic) Daniel Vacek
3 Aug	du Maurier Open; Toronto, Ontario, Canada; ATP Super 9 Hard – $2,200,000 – 56S/28Q/28D; Singles – Doubles	(Czech Republic) Martin Damm (United States) Jim Grabb; 6–7, 6–2, 7–6	(South Africa) Ellis Ferreira (United States) Rick Leach	(United States) Andre Agassi (United Kingdom) Tim Henman	(United States) Pete Sampras (Russia) Yevgeny Kafelnikov (Sweden) Jonas Björkman (Czech Republic) Daniel Vacek
3 Aug	Dutch Open; Amsterdam, Netherlands; ATP World Series; Clay – $475,000 – 32S/16D; Singles – Doubles	(Sweden) Magnus Norman; 6–3, 6–3, 2–6, 6–4	(Australia) Richard Fromberg	(Slovakia) Karol Kučera (Argentina) Mariano Zabaleta	(Slovakia) Dominik Hrbatý (Romania) Adrian Voinea (Spain) Galo Blanco (Czech Republic) Slava Doseděl
3 Aug	Dutch Open; Amsterdam, Netherlands; ATP World Series; Clay – $475,000 – 32S/16D; Singles – Doubles	(Netherlands) Jacco Eltingh (Netherlands) Paul Haarhuis; 6–3, 6–2	(Slovakia) Dominik Hrbatý (Slovakia) Karol Kučera	(Slovakia) Karol Kučera (Argentina) Mariano Zabaleta	(Slovakia) Dominik Hrbatý (Romania) Adrian Voinea (Spain) Galo Blanco (Czech Republic) Slava Doseděl
10 Aug	Great American Insurance ATP Championships; Mason, United States; ATP Super 9 Hard – $2,200,000 – 56S/28Q/28D; Singles – Doubles	(Australia) Patrick Rafter; 1–6, 7–6^{(7–2)}, 6–4	(United States) Pete Sampras	(Sweden) Magnus Larsson (Russia) Yevgeny Kafelnikov	(United States) Vincent Spadea (Sweden) Thomas Johansson (Czech Republic) Petr Korda (Czech Republic) Daniel Vacek
10 Aug	Great American Insurance ATP Championships; Mason, United States; ATP Super 9 Hard – $2,200,000 – 56S/28Q/28D; Singles – Doubles	(The Bahamas) Mark Knowles (Canada) Daniel Nestor; 6–1, 2–1 ret.	(France) Olivier Delaître (France) Fabrice Santoro	(Sweden) Magnus Larsson (Russia) Yevgeny Kafelnikov	(United States) Vincent Spadea (Sweden) Thomas Johansson (Czech Republic) Petr Korda (Czech Republic) Daniel Vacek
10 Aug	Campionati Internazionali di San Marino; City of San Marino, San Marino; ATP World Series; Clay – $275,000 – 32S/23Q/16D/2Q; Singles – Doubles	(Slovakia) Dominik Hrbatý; 6–2, 7–5	(Argentina) Mariano Puerta	(Spain) Carlos Costa (Australia) Richard Fromberg	(Italy) Andrea Gaudenzi (Spain) Juan Albert Viloca (Argentina) Mariano Zabaleta (Italy) Vincenzo Santopadre
10 Aug	Campionati Internazionali di San Marino; City of San Marino, San Marino; ATP World Series; Clay – $275,000 – 32S/23Q/16D/2Q; Singles – Doubles	(Czech Republic) Jiří Novák (Czech Republic) David Rikl; 6–4, 7–6	(Argentina) Mariano Hood (Argentina) Sebastián Prieto	(Spain) Carlos Costa (Australia) Richard Fromberg	(Italy) Andrea Gaudenzi (Spain) Juan Albert Viloca (Argentina) Mariano Zabaleta (Italy) Vincenzo Santopadre
17 Aug	RCA Championships; Indianapolis, United States; ATP Championship Series; Hard – $915,000 – 56S/28Q/28D; Singles – Doubles	(Spain) Àlex Corretja; 2–6, 6–2, 6–3	(United States) Andre Agassi	(Paraguay) Ramón Delgado (United States) Todd Martin	(Zimbabwe) Byron Black (South Africa) Wayne Ferreira (United Kingdom) Greg Rusedski (Morocco) Hicham Arazi
17 Aug	RCA Championships; Indianapolis, United States; ATP Championship Series; Hard – $915,000 – 56S/28Q/28D; Singles – Doubles	(Czech Republic) Jiří Novák (Czech Republic) David Rikl; 6–2, 7–6	(The Bahamas) Mark Knowles (Canada) Daniel Nestor	(Paraguay) Ramón Delgado (United States) Todd Martin	(Zimbabwe) Byron Black (South Africa) Wayne Ferreira (United Kingdom) Greg Rusedski (Morocco) Hicham Arazi
17 Aug	Pilot Pen International; New Haven, United States; ATP Championship Series; Hard – $745,000 – 56S/28Q/28D; Singles – Doubles	(Slovakia) Karol Kučera; 6–4, 5–7, 6–2	(Croatia) Goran Ivanišević	(Russia) Yevgeny Kafelnikov (Netherlands) Richard Krajicek	(India) Leander Paes (Czech Republic) Bohdan Ulihrach (United Kingdom) Tim Henman (France) Guillaume Raoux
17 Aug	Pilot Pen International; New Haven, United States; ATP Championship Series; Hard – $745,000 – 56S/28Q/28D; Singles – Doubles	(Australia) Wayne Arthurs (Australia) Peter Tramacchi; 7–6, 1–6, 6–3	(Canada) Sébastien Lareau (United States) Alex O'Brien	(Russia) Yevgeny Kafelnikov (Netherlands) Richard Krajicek	(India) Leander Paes (Czech Republic) Bohdan Ulihrach (United Kingdom) Tim Henman (France) Guillaume Raoux
24 Aug	Waldbaum's Hamlet Cup; Long Island, United States; ATP World Series; Hard – $315,000 – 32S/16D; Singles – Doubles	(Australia) Patrick Rafter; 7–6^{(7–3)}, 6–2	(Spain) Félix Mantilla	(Russia) Marat Safin (United Kingdom) Greg Rusedski	(Brazil) Gustavo Kuerten (Germany) David Prinosil (Czech Republic) Daniel Vacek (France) Nicolas Escudé
24 Aug	Waldbaum's Hamlet Cup; Long Island, United States; ATP World Series; Hard – $315,000 – 32S/16D; Singles – Doubles	(Spain) Julian Alonso (Spain) Javier Sánchez; 6–4, 6–4	(United States) Brandon Coupe (United States) Dave Randall	(Russia) Marat Safin (United Kingdom) Greg Rusedski	(Brazil) Gustavo Kuerten (Germany) David Prinosil (Czech Republic) Daniel Vacek (France) Nicolas Escudé
24 Aug	MFS Pro Tennis Championships; Boston, United States; ATP World Series; Hard – $315,000 – 32S/16D/3Q; Singles – Doubles	(United States) Michael Chang; 6–3, 6–4	(Netherlands) Paul Haarhuis	(France) Sébastien Grosjean (France) Cédric Pioline	(Sweden) Jonas Björkman (Italy) Gianluca Pozzi (Austria) Thomas Muster (Netherlands) Sjeng Schalken
24 Aug	MFS Pro Tennis Championships; Boston, United States; ATP World Series; Hard – $315,000 – 32S/16D/3Q; Singles – Doubles	(Netherlands) Jacco Eltingh (Netherlands) Paul Haarhuis; 6–3, 6–2	(South Africa) Chris Haggard (United States) Jack Waite	(France) Sébastien Grosjean (France) Cédric Pioline	(Sweden) Jonas Björkman (Italy) Gianluca Pozzi (Austria) Thomas Muster (Netherlands) Sjeng Schalken
31 Aug; 7 Sep	US Open; New York City, United States; Grand Slam; Hard – $6,032,000 – 128S/64D/32X; Singles – Doubles; Mixed doubles	(Australia) Patrick Rafter; 6–3, 3–6, 6–2, 6–0	(Australia) Mark Philippoussis	(United States) Pete Sampras (Spain) Carlos Moyá	(Slovakia) Karol Kučera (Sweden) Jonas Björkman (Sweden) Thomas Johansson (Sweden) Magnus Larsson
31 Aug; 7 Sep	US Open; New York City, United States; Grand Slam; Hard – $6,032,000 – 128S/64D/32X; Singles – Doubles; Mixed doubles	(Czech Republic) Cyril Suk (Australia) Sandon Stolle; 4–6, 7–6, 6–2	(The Bahamas) Mark Knowles (Canada) Daniel Nestor	(United States) Pete Sampras (Spain) Carlos Moyá	(Slovakia) Karol Kučera (Sweden) Jonas Björkman (Sweden) Thomas Johansson (Sweden) Magnus Larsson
31 Aug; 7 Sep	US Open; New York City, United States; Grand Slam; Hard – $6,032,000 – 128S/64D/32X; Singles – Doubles; Mixed doubles	(Belarus) Max Mirnyi (United States) Serena Williams; 6–2, 6–2	(United States) Patrick Galbraith (United States) Lisa Raymond	(United States) Pete Sampras (Spain) Carlos Moyá	(Slovakia) Karol Kučera (Sweden) Jonas Björkman (Sweden) Thomas Johansson (Sweden) Magnus Larsson

=== September ===
Week	Tournament	Champions	Runners-up	Semifinalists	Quarterfinalists
14 Sep	Bournemouth International; Bournemouth, Great Britain; ATP World Series; Clay – $375,000 – 32S/29Q/16D; Singles – Doubles	(Spain) Félix Mantilla; 6–3, 7–5	(Spain) Albert Costa	(Germany) Marc-Kevin Goellner (Italy) Vincenzo Santopadre	(Spain) Alberto Berasategui (Austria) Stefan Koubek (Spain) Álex López Morón (France) Arnaud Clément
14 Sep	Bournemouth International; Bournemouth, Great Britain; ATP World Series; Clay – $375,000 – 32S/29Q/16D; Singles – Doubles	(United Kingdom) Neil Broad (Zimbabwe) Kevin Ullyett; 7–6, 6–3	(Australia) Wayne Arthurs (Spain) Alberto Berasategui	(Germany) Marc-Kevin Goellner (Italy) Vincenzo Santopadre	(Spain) Alberto Berasategui (Austria) Stefan Koubek (Spain) Álex López Morón (France) Arnaud Clément
14 Sep	President's Cup; Tashkent, Uzbekistan; ATP World Series; Hard – $380,000 – 32S/27Q/16D; Singles – Doubles	(United Kingdom) Tim Henman; 7–5, 6–4	(Russia) Yevgeny Kafelnikov	(France) Cédric Pioline (France) Nicolas Escudé	(Argentina) Gastón Etlis (Russia) Marat Safin (Germany) Karsten Braasch (Italy) Stefano Pescosolido
14 Sep	President's Cup; Tashkent, Uzbekistan; ATP World Series; Hard – $380,000 – 32S/27Q/16D; Singles – Doubles	(Italy) Stefano Pescosolido (Italy) Laurence Tieleman; 7–5, 4–6, 7–5	(Denmark) Kenneth Carlsen (Netherlands) Sjeng Schalken	(France) Cédric Pioline (France) Nicolas Escudé	(Argentina) Gastón Etlis (Russia) Marat Safin (Germany) Karsten Braasch (Italy) Stefano Pescosolido
14 Sep	Romanian Open; Bucharest, Romania; ATP World Series; Clay – $470,000 – 32S/16D; Singles – Doubles	(Spain) Francisco Clavet; 6–4, 2–6, 7–5	(France) Arnaud Di Pasquale	(Spain) Albert Portas (Romania) Adrian Voinea	(Spain) Julian Alonso (Romania) Andrei Pavel (Spain) Galo Blanco (Spain) Emilio Benfele Álvarez
14 Sep	Romanian Open; Bucharest, Romania; ATP World Series; Clay – $470,000 – 32S/16D; Singles – Doubles	(Romania) Andrei Pavel (Romania) Gabriel Trifu; 7–6, 7–6	(Romania) George Cosac (Romania) Dinu Pescariu	(Spain) Albert Portas (Romania) Adrian Voinea	(Spain) Julian Alonso (Romania) Andrei Pavel (Spain) Galo Blanco (Spain) Emilio Benfele Álvarez
21 Sep	1998 Davis Cup Semifinals; Stockholm, Sweden – carpet (i); Milwaukee, United States – hard (i)	Semifinal winners Sweden 4–1; Italy 4–1	Semifinal losers Spain; United States		
28 Sep	Majorca Open; Mallorca, Spain; ATP World Series; Clay – $425,000 – 32S/29Q/16D; Singles – Doubles	(Brazil) Gustavo Kuerten; 6–7^{(5–7)}, 6–2, 6–3	(Spain) Carlos Moyá	(Spain) Fernando Vicente (Austria) Thomas Muster	(Austria) Thomas Schiessling (Spain) Tomás Carbonell (Germany) Tommy Haas (Spain) Sergi Bruguera
28 Sep	Majorca Open; Mallorca, Spain; ATP World Series; Clay – $425,000 – 32S/29Q/16D; Singles – Doubles	(Argentina) Daniel Orsanic (Argentina) Pablo Albano; 7–6, 6–3	(Czech Republic) Jiří Novák (Czech Republic) David Rikl	(Spain) Fernando Vicente (Austria) Thomas Muster	(Austria) Thomas Schiessling (Spain) Tomás Carbonell (Germany) Tommy Haas (Spain) Sergi Bruguera
28 Sep	Grand Prix de Tennis de Toulouse; Toulouse, France; ATP World Series; Hard (i) – $375,000 – 32S/16D; Singles – Doubles	(Netherlands) Jan Siemerink; 6–4, 6–4	(United Kingdom) Greg Rusedski	(Germany) Nicolas Kiefer (Sweden) Thomas Johansson	(France) Arnaud Clément (Switzerland) Marc Rosset (France) Stéphane Huet (Switzerland) Roger Federer
28 Sep	Grand Prix de Tennis de Toulouse; Toulouse, France; ATP World Series; Hard (i) – $375,000 – 32S/16D; Singles – Doubles	(France) Fabrice Santoro (France) Olivier Delaître; 6–2, 6–4	(Netherlands) Paul Haarhuis (Netherlands) Jan Siemerink	(Germany) Nicolas Kiefer (Sweden) Thomas Johansson	(France) Arnaud Clément (Switzerland) Marc Rosset (France) Stéphane Huet (Switzerland) Roger Federer
28 Sep	Grand Slam Cup; Munich, Germany; Grand Slam Cup; Hard (i) – $4,250,000 – 12S; Singles	(Chile) Marcelo Ríos; 6–4, 2–6, 7–6^{(7–1)}, 5–7, 6–3	(United States) Andre Agassi	(Slovakia) Karol Kučera (Australia) Mark Philippoussis	(Czech Republic) Petr Korda (Croatia) Goran Ivanišević (Sweden) Jonas Björkman (Spain) Félix Mantilla

=== October ===
Week	Tournament	Champions	Runners-up	Semifinalists	Quarterfinalists
5 Oct	Davidoff Swiss Indoors; Basel, Switzerland; ATP World Series; Hard (i) – $975,000 – 32S/16D; Singles – Doubles	(United Kingdom) Tim Henman; 6–4, 6–3, 3–6, 6–4	(United States) Andre Agassi	(Switzerland) Marc Rosset (Sweden) Thomas Johansson	(Germany) David Prinosil (Sweden) Magnus Gustafsson (Germany) Nicolas Kiefer (France) Fabrice Santoro
5 Oct	Davidoff Swiss Indoors; Basel, Switzerland; ATP World Series; Hard (i) – $975,000 – 32S/16D; Singles – Doubles	(France) Fabrice Santoro (France) Olivier Delaître; 6–3, 7–6	(South Africa) Piet Norval (Zimbabwe) Kevin Ullyett	(Switzerland) Marc Rosset (Sweden) Thomas Johansson	(Germany) David Prinosil (Sweden) Magnus Gustafsson (Germany) Nicolas Kiefer (France) Fabrice Santoro
5 Oct	Campionati Internazionali di Sicilia; Palermo, Italy; ATP World Series; Clay – $315,000 – 32S/16D; Singles – Doubles	(Argentina) Mariano Puerta; 6–3, 6–2	(Argentina) Franco Squillari	(Spain) Àlex Corretja (Spain) Galo Blanco	(Ecuador) Nicolás Lapentti (Spain) Fernando Vicente (Argentina) Mariano Zabaleta (France) Arnaud Di Pasquale
5 Oct	Campionati Internazionali di Sicilia; Palermo, Italy; ATP World Series; Clay – $315,000 – 32S/16D; Singles – Doubles	(United States) Francisco Montana (United States) Donald Johnson; 6–4, 7–6	(Argentina) Pablo Albano (Argentina) Daniel Orsanic	(Spain) Àlex Corretja (Spain) Galo Blanco	(Ecuador) Nicolás Lapentti (Spain) Fernando Vicente (Argentina) Mariano Zabaleta (France) Arnaud Di Pasquale
5 Oct	Shanghai Open; Shanghai, China; ATP World Series; Carpet (i) – $315,000 – 32S/16D; Singles – Doubles	(United States) Michael Chang; 4–6, 6–1, 6–2	(Croatia) Goran Ivanišević	(Paraguay) Ramón Delgado (Netherlands) Paul Haarhuis	(Denmark) Kenneth Carlsen (Australia) Michael Tebbutt (Australia) Mark Woodforde (Australia) Todd Woodbridge
5 Oct	Shanghai Open; Shanghai, China; ATP World Series; Carpet (i) – $315,000 – 32S/16D; Singles – Doubles	(India) Mahesh Bhupathi (India) Leander Paes; 6–4, 6–7, 7–6	(Australia) Todd Woodbridge (Australia) Mark Woodforde	(Paraguay) Ramón Delgado (Netherlands) Paul Haarhuis	(Denmark) Kenneth Carlsen (Australia) Michael Tebbutt (Australia) Mark Woodforde (Australia) Todd Woodbridge
12 Oct	Singapore Open; Singapore, Singapore; ATP Championship Series; Hard (i) – $575,000 – 32S/16D; Singles – Doubles	(Chile) Marcelo Ríos; 6–4, 6–2	(Australia) Mark Woodforde	(United States) Jim Courier (Netherlands) Sjeng Schalken	(Australia) Lleyton Hewitt (United States) Jan-Michael Gambill (Netherlands) John Van Lottum (Denmark) Kenneth Carlsen
12 Oct	Singapore Open; Singapore, Singapore; ATP Championship Series; Hard (i) – $575,000 – 32S/16D; Singles – Doubles	(Australia) Todd Woodbridge (Australia) Mark Woodforde; 6–2, 6–3	(India) Mahesh Bhupathi (India) Leander Paes	(United States) Jim Courier (Netherlands) Sjeng Schalken	(Australia) Lleyton Hewitt (United States) Jan-Michael Gambill (Netherlands) John Van Lottum (Denmark) Kenneth Carlsen
12 Oct	CA-TennisTrophy; Vienna, Austria; ATP Championship Series; Carpet (i) – $675,000 – 32S/16D; Singles – Doubles	(United States) Pete Sampras; 6–3, 7–6^{(7–3)}, 6–1	(Slovakia) Karol Kučera	(United States) Todd Martin (United Kingdom) Greg Rusedski	(United Kingdom) Tim Henman (France) Cédric Pioline (Sweden) Jonas Björkman (Australia) Patrick Rafter
12 Oct	CA-TennisTrophy; Vienna, Austria; ATP Championship Series; Carpet (i) – $675,000 – 32S/16D; Singles – Doubles	(Russia) Yevgeny Kafelnikov (Czech Republic) Daniel Vacek; 7–5, 6–3	(South Africa) David Adams (South Africa) John-Laffnie de Jager	(United States) Todd Martin (United Kingdom) Greg Rusedski	(United Kingdom) Tim Henman (France) Cédric Pioline (Sweden) Jonas Björkman (Australia) Patrick Rafter
19 Oct	Grand Prix de Tennis de Lyon; Lyon, France; ATP World Series; Carpet (i) – $725,000 – 32S/16D; Singles – Doubles	(Spain) Àlex Corretja; 2–6, 7–6^{(8–6)}, 6–1	(Germany) Tommy Haas	(Chile) Marcelo Ríos (South Africa) Wayne Ferreira	(United States) Pete Sampras (France) Arnaud Di Pasquale (France) Olivier Delaître (Australia) Patrick Rafter
19 Oct	Grand Prix de Tennis de Lyon; Lyon, France; ATP World Series; Carpet (i) – $725,000 – 32S/16D; Singles – Doubles	(France) Olivier Delaître (France) Fabrice Santoro; 6–2, 6–2	(Spain) Tomás Carbonell (Spain) Francisco Roig	(Chile) Marcelo Ríos (South Africa) Wayne Ferreira	(United States) Pete Sampras (France) Arnaud Di Pasquale (France) Olivier Delaître (Australia) Patrick Rafter
19 Oct	IPB Czech Indoor; Ostrava, Czech Republic; ATP World Series; Carpet (i) – $975,000 – 32S/16D; Singles – Doubles	(United States) Andre Agassi; 6–2, 3–6, 6–3	(Slovakia) Ján Krošlák	(Sweden) Thomas Enqvist (Zimbabwe) Wayne Black	(Sweden) Nicklas Kulti (Ukraine) Andrei Medvedev (Czech Republic) Martin Damm (Sweden) Thomas Johansson
19 Oct	IPB Czech Indoor; Ostrava, Czech Republic; ATP World Series; Carpet (i) – $975,000 – 32S/16D; Singles – Doubles	(Germany) Nicolas Kiefer (Germany) David Prinosil; 6–4, 6–3	(South Africa) David Adams (Czech Republic) Pavel Vízner	(Sweden) Thomas Enqvist (Zimbabwe) Wayne Black	(Sweden) Nicklas Kulti (Ukraine) Andrei Medvedev (Czech Republic) Martin Damm (Sweden) Thomas Johansson
26 Oct	Abierto Mexicano Telcel; Mexico City, Mexico; ATP World Series; Clay – $315,000 – 32S/16D; Singles – Doubles	(Czech Republic) Jiří Novák; 6–3, 6–3	(Belgium) Xavier Malisse	(Spain) Francisco Clavet (Argentina) Mariano Puerta	(Costa Rica) Juan Antonio Marín (Italy) Davide Sanguinetti (Mexico) Alejandro Hernández (Spain) Jordi Burillo
26 Oct	Abierto Mexicano Telcel; Mexico City, Mexico; ATP World Series; Clay – $315,000 – 32S/16D; Singles – Doubles	(Czech Republic) Jiří Novák (Czech Republic) David Rikl; 6–4, 6–2	(Argentina) Daniel Orsanic (Mexico) David Roditi	(Spain) Francisco Clavet (Argentina) Mariano Puerta	(Costa Rica) Juan Antonio Marín (Italy) Davide Sanguinetti (Mexico) Alejandro Hernández (Spain) Jordi Burillo
26 Oct	Eurocard Open; Stuttgart, Germany; ATP Super 9 Hard (i) – $2,200,000 – 48S/28Q/32D/3Q; Singles – Doubles	(Netherlands) Richard Krajicek; 6–4, 6–3, 6–3	(Russia) Yevgeny Kafelnikov	(United States) Pete Sampras (Sweden) Jonas Björkman	(United States) Jan-Michael Gambill (Croatia) Goran Ivanišević (United Kingdom) Greg Rusedski (Chile) Marcelo Ríos
26 Oct	Eurocard Open; Stuttgart, Germany; ATP Super 9 Hard (i) – $2,200,000 – 48S/28Q/32D/3Q; Singles – Doubles	(Canada) Sébastien Lareau (United States) Alex O'Brien; 6–3, 3–6, 7–5	(India) Mahesh Bhupathi (India) Leander Paes	(United States) Pete Sampras (Sweden) Jonas Björkman	(United States) Jan-Michael Gambill (Croatia) Goran Ivanišević (United Kingdom) Greg Rusedski (Chile) Marcelo Ríos

=== November ===
Week	Tournament	Champions	Runners-up	Semifinalists	Quarterfinalists
2 Nov	Cerveza Club Colombia Open; Bogotá, Colombia; ATP World Series; Clay – $315,000 – 32S/16D; Singles – Doubles	(Argentina) Mariano Zabaleta; 6–4, 6–4	(Paraguay) Ramón Delgado	(Armenia) Sargis Sargsian (Czech Republic) Jiří Novák	(United States) Jim Courier (Spain) Juan Balcells (Colombia) Mauricio Hadad (Italy) Davide Sanguinetti
2 Nov	Cerveza Club Colombia Open; Bogotá, Colombia; ATP World Series; Clay – $315,000 – 32S/16D; Singles – Doubles	(Argentina) Diego del Río (Argentina) Mariano Puerta; 6–7, 6–3, 6–2	(Hungary) Gábor Köves (Philippines) Eric Taino	(Armenia) Sargis Sargsian (Czech Republic) Jiří Novák	(United States) Jim Courier (Spain) Juan Balcells (Colombia) Mauricio Hadad (Italy) Davide Sanguinetti
2 Nov	Paris Open; Paris, France; ATP Super 9 Carpet (i) – $2,300,000 – 48S/24Q/24D; Singles – Doubles	(United Kingdom) Greg Rusedski; 6–4, 7–6^{(7–4)}, 6–3	(United States) Pete Sampras	(United States) Todd Martin (Russia) Yevgeny Kafelnikov	(Australia) Mark Philippoussis (United States) Andre Agassi (Sweden) Magnus Gustafsson (Chile) Marcelo Ríos
2 Nov	Paris Open; Paris, France; ATP Super 9 Carpet (i) – $2,300,000 – 48S/24Q/24D; Singles – Doubles	(India) Mahesh Bhupathi (India) Leander Paes; 6–4, 6–2	(Netherlands) Jacco Eltingh (Netherlands) Paul Haarhuis	(United States) Todd Martin (Russia) Yevgeny Kafelnikov	(Australia) Mark Philippoussis (United States) Andre Agassi (Sweden) Magnus Gustafsson (Chile) Marcelo Ríos
9 Nov	Kremlin Cup; Moscow, Russia; ATP World Series; Carpet (i) – $1,125,000 – 32S/16D; Singles – Doubles	(Russia) Yevgeny Kafelnikov; 7–6^{(7–2)}, 7–6^{(7–5)}	(Croatia) Goran Ivanišević	(France) Arnaud Clément (Switzerland) Marc Rosset	(Canada) Sébastien Lareau (Germany) Lars Burgsmüller (Slovakia) Ján Krošlák (France) Guillaume Raoux
9 Nov	Kremlin Cup; Moscow, Russia; ATP World Series; Carpet (i) – $1,125,000 – 32S/16D; Singles – Doubles	(United States) Jared Palmer (United States) Jeff Tarango; 6–4, 6–7, 6–2	(Russia) Yevgeny Kafelnikov (Czech Republic) Daniel Vacek	(France) Arnaud Clément (Switzerland) Marc Rosset	(Canada) Sébastien Lareau (Germany) Lars Burgsmüller (Slovakia) Ján Krošlák (France) Guillaume Raoux
9 Nov	Chevrolet Cup; Santiago, Chile; ATP World Series; Clay – $315,000 – 32S/16D; Singles – Doubles	(Spain) Francisco Clavet; 6–2, 6–4	(Morocco) Younes El Aynaoui	(Costa Rica) Juan Antonio Marín (Spain) Félix Mantilla	(Chile) Marcelo Ríos (Ecuador) Nicolás Lapentti (Argentina) Mariano Puerta (United States) Jim Courier
9 Nov	Chevrolet Cup; Santiago, Chile; ATP World Series; Clay – $315,000 – 32S/16D; Singles – Doubles	(Argentina) Mariano Hood (Argentina) Sebastián Prieto; 7–6, 6–7, 7–6	(Italy) Massimo Bertolini (United States) Devin Bowen	(Costa Rica) Juan Antonio Marín (Spain) Félix Mantilla	(Chile) Marcelo Ríos (Ecuador) Nicolás Lapentti (Argentina) Mariano Puerta (United States) Jim Courier
9 Nov	Stockholm Open; Stockholm, Sweden; ATP World Series; Hard (i) – $800,000 – 32S/16D; Singles – Doubles	(United States) Todd Martin; 6–3, 6–4, 6–4	(Sweden) Thomas Johansson	(United Kingdom) Greg Rusedski (United Kingdom) Tim Henman	(Australia) Jason Stoltenberg (Canada) Daniel Nestor (Sweden) Magnus Gustafsson (Japan) Takao Suzuki
9 Nov	Stockholm Open; Stockholm, Sweden; ATP World Series; Hard (i) – $800,000 – 32S/16D; Singles – Doubles	(Sweden) Nicklas Kulti (Sweden) Mikael Tillström; 7–5, 3–6, 7–5	(South Africa) Chris Haggard (Sweden) Peter Nyborg	(United Kingdom) Greg Rusedski (United Kingdom) Tim Henman	(Australia) Jason Stoltenberg (Canada) Daniel Nestor (Sweden) Magnus Gustafsson (Japan) Takao Suzuki
16 Nov	ATP Tour World Championships Doubles; Hartford, United States; ATP Tour World Championships; Carpet (i) – $ – 8D (RR); Doubles	(Netherlands) Jacco Eltingh (Netherlands) Paul Haarhuis; 6–4, 6–2, 7–5	(The Bahamas) Mark Knowles (Canada) Daniel Nestor	(United States) Donald Johnson / (United States) Francisco Montana (France) Olivier Delaître / (France) Fabrice Santoro	
23 Nov	ATP Tour World Championships Singles; Hanover, Germany; ATP Tour World Championships; Hard (i) – $ – 8S (RR); Singles	(Spain) Àlex Corretja; 3–6, 3–6, 7–5, 6–3, 7–5	(Spain) Carlos Moyá	(United Kingdom) Tim Henman (United States) Pete Sampras	Round robin (Spain) Albert Costa (United Kingdom) Greg Rusedski (Russia) Yevgeny Kafelnikov (Slovakia) Karol Kučera (United States) Andre Agassi (Chile) Marcelo Ríos
30 Nov	Davis Cup by BNP Paribas Final; Milan, Italy – clay (i)	Sweden; 4–1	Italy		

== ATP rankings ==
These are the rankings of the top twenty players of the ATP Tour, at the end of the 1997 ATP Tour, and of the 1998 season, with number of rankings points, highest and lowest position during the year, and number of spots gained or lost from 1997 to 1998.

=== Singles ===
as of December 15, 1997
Rk	Player	Nation
1	Pete Sampras	USA
2	Patrick Rafter	AUS
3	Michael Chang	USA
4	Jonas Björkman	SWE
5	Yevgeny Kafelnikov	RUS
6	Greg Rusedski	GBR
7	Carlos Moyá	ESP
8	Sergi Bruguera	ESP
9	Thomas Muster	AUT
10	Marcelo Ríos	CHI
11	Richard Krajicek	NED
12	Àlex Corretja	ESP
13	Petr Korda	CZE
14	Gustavo Kuerten	BRA
15	Goran Ivanišević	CRO
16	Félix Mantilla	ESP
17	Tim Henman	GBR
18	Mark Philippoussis	AUS
19	Albert Costa	ESP
20	Cédric Pioline	FRA

Year-end rankings 1998 (28 December 1998)
Rk	Player	Nation	Points	High	Low	Change
1	Pete Sampras	USA	3915	1	2	Steady
2	Marcelo Ríos	CHI	3670	1	10	▲8
3	Àlex Corretja	ESP	3398	3	14	▲9
4	Patrick Rafter	AUS	3315	2	6	▼2
5	Carlos Moyá	ESP	3159	4	21	▲2
6	Andre Agassi	USA	2879	6	110	▲104
7	Tim Henman	GBR	2620	7	21	▲10
8	Karol Kučera	SVK	2579	6	25	▲16
9	Greg Rusedski	GBR	2573	4	15	▼3
10	Richard Krajicek	NED	2548	5	14	▲1
11	Yevgeny Kafelnikov	RUS	2515	4	12	▼6
12	Goran Ivanišević	CRO	2137	12	25	▲3
13	Petr Korda	CZE	2114	2	13	Steady
14	Albert Costa	ESP	1823	13	27	▲5
15	Mark Philippoussis	AUS	1792	13	28	▲3
16	Todd Martin	USA	1774	16	81	▲65
17	Thomas Johansson	SWE	1761	17	54	▲20
18	Cédric Pioline	FRA	1710	10	20	▲2
19	Jan Siemerink	NED	1669	14	78	▲59
20	Félix Mantilla	ESP	1643	10	22	▼4

== Statistical information ==
These tables present the number of singles (S), doubles (D), and mixed doubles (X) titles won by each player and each nation during the season, within all the tournament categories of the 1998 ATP Tour: the Grand Slam tournaments, the ATP Tour World Championships, the ATP Super 9, the ATP Championship Series, and the ATP World Series.

=== Titles won by player ===
Total titles	Player	Grand Slam tournaments			ATP Tour Finals		ATP Tour Super 9		ATP Tour Championship Series		ATP Tour World Series		All titles		
Total titles	Player	S	D	X	S	D	S	D	S	D	S	D	S	D	X
9	(Netherlands) Jacco Eltingh		3					1		2		3	0	9	0
9	(Australia) Patrick Rafter	1					2	1			3	1	6	2	0
8	(Netherlands) Paul Haarhuis		2					1		2		3	0	8	0
7	(Chile) Marcelo Ríos						3		1		2		7^	0	0
5	(India) Leander Paes							1			1	3	1	4	0
4	(United States) Pete Sampras	1							2		1		4	0	0
4	(United States) Andre Agassi								1		3		4	0	0
4	(India) Mahesh Bhupathi							1				3	0	4	0
4	(Australia) Todd Woodbridge									1		3	0	4	0
4	(Australia) Mark Woodforde									1		3	0	4	0
4	(Zimbabwe) Kevin Ullyett									1		3	0	4	0
3	(Sweden) Jonas Björkman		1					1			1		1	2	0
3	(Spain) Àlex Corretja				1				1		3		5	0	5
3	(Czech Republic) Martin Damm									1		2	0	3	0
3	(South Africa) Ellis Ferreira							1				2	0	3	0
3	(United States) Justin Gimelstob			2								1	0	1	2
3	(United States) Jim Grabb									1		2	0	3	0
3	(Sweden) Magnus Gustafsson										2	1	2	1	0
3	(Netherlands) Paul Haarhuis									2		1	0	3	0
3	(United States) Donald Johnson							1				2	0	3	0
3	(Russia) Yevgeny Kafelnikov								1	1	2		3	1	0
3	(United States) Francisco Montana							1				2	0	3	0
3	(Czech Republic) Jiří Novák									1		2	0	3	0
3	(South Africa) Grant Stafford									1		2	0	3	0
3	(Australia) Sandon Stolle		1									2	0	3	0
2	(Spain) Julian Alonso										1	1	1	1	0
2	(Australia) Wayne Arthurs									1		1	0	2	0
2	(United Kingdom) Neil Broad											1	0	1	0
2	(Spain) Albert Costa						1				1		2	0	0
2	(Sweden) Thomas Enqvist										2		2	0	0
2	(Italy) Andrea Gaudenzi										1	1	1	1	0
2	(Netherlands) Tom Kempers											2	0	2	0
2	(Czech Republic) Petr Korda	1									1		2	0	0
2	(Slovakia) Karol Kučera								1		1		2	0	0
2	(Brazil) Gustavo Kuerten								1			1	1	1	0
2	(United States) Rick Leach							1				1	0	2	0
2	(Brazil) Fernando Meligeni										1	1	1	1	0
2	(Belarus) Max Mirnyi			2									0	0	2
2	(Spain) Carlos Moyá	1					1						2	0	0
2	(Canada) Daniel Nestor							1		1			0	2	0
2	(Romania) Andrei Pavel								1			1	1	1	0
2	(Czech Republic) David Rikl									1		1	0	2	0
2	(Netherlands) Jan Siemerink										1	1	1	1	0
2	(Czech Republic) Cyril Suk		1									1	0	2	0
1	(Spain) Alberto Berasategui										1		1	0	0
1	(Zimbabwe) Byron Black											1	0	1	0
1	(Denmark) Kenneth Carlsen										1		1	0	0
1	(United States) Michael Chang										1		1	0	0
1	(Spain) Francisco Clavet										1		1	0	0
1	(United States) Brandon Coupe											1	0	1	0
1	(United States) Jim Courier										1		1	0	0
1	(France) Olivier Delaître									1			0	1	0
1	(Australia) Scott Draper										1		1	0	0
1	(Australia) Joshua Eagle											1	0	1	0
1	(South Africa) Wayne Ferreira									1			0	1	0
1	(United States) Doug Flach											1	0	1	0
1	(Australia) Andrew Florent											1	0	1	0
1	(United States) Patrick Galbraith											1	0	1	0
1	(South Africa) Brent Haygarth											1	0	1	0
1	(Australia) Mark Philippoussis										1		1	0	0
1	(Australia) Lleyton Hewitt										1		1	0	0
1	(Slovakia) Dominik Hrbatý										1		1	0	0
1	(Australia) Andrew Ilie										1		1	0	0
1	(Croatia) Goran Ivanišević										1		1	0	0
1	(The Bahamas) Mark Knowles							1					0	1	0
1	(Netherlands) Richard Krajicek										1		1	0	0
1	(Australia) Andrew Kratzmann											1	0	1	0
1	(Sweden) Nicklas Kulti											1	0	1	0
1	(Canada) Sébastien Lareau									1			0	1	0
1	(Sweden) Magnus Larsson											1	0	1	0
1	(Australia) David Macpherson											1	0	1	0
1	(Spain) Félix Mantilla										1		1	0	0
1	(United States) Todd Martin								1				1	0	0
1	(Italy) Diego Nargiso											1	0	1	0
1	(Sweden) Magnus Norman										1		1	0	0
1	(South Africa) Piet Norval											1	0	1	0
1	(Netherlands) Menno Oosting											1	0	1	0
1	(United States) Alex O'Brien											1	0	1	0
1	(Argentina) Daniel Orsanic											1	0	1	0
1	(Italy) Stefano Pescosolido											1	0	1	0
1	(Australia) Mark Philippoussis								1				1	0	0
1	(France) Guillaume Raoux											1	0	1	0
1	(South Africa) Paul Rosner											1	0	1	0
1	(United Kingdom) Greg Rusedski								1				1	0	0
1	(Spain) Javier Sánchez											1	0	1	0
1	(France) Fabrice Santoro									1			0	1	0
1	(New Zealand) Brett Steven											1	0	1	0
1	(South Africa) Byron Talbot											1	0	1	0
1	(Australia) Michael Tebbutt											1	0	1	0
1	(Italy) Laurence Tieleman											1	0	1	0
1	(Sweden) Mikael Tillström											1	0	1	0
1	(Australia) Peter Tramacchi									1			0	1	0
1	(Romania) Gabriel Trifu											1	0	1	0
1	(Czech Republic) Bohdan Ulihrach										1		1	0	0

^ Rios also won the Grand Slam Cup, which on December 9, 1999, merged with the ATP Tour World Championship, the ATP's year-end tournament also held annually in Germany. This gave birth to the present ATP World Tour Finals.

Titles won by nation (singles):

- United States 13 (San Jose, Philadelphia, Scottsdale, Barcelona, Orlando, Atlanta, Wimbledon, Washington, D.C., Los Angeles, Boston, Shanghai, Vienna, Ostrava, Stockholm)
- Spain 12 (Dubai, Estoril, Monte Carlo Masters, Hamburg Masters, French Open, Bologna, Gstaad, Kitzbühel, Indianapolis, Bournemouth, Bucharest, Lyon, Santiago, ATP Finals)
- Australia 10 (Adelaide, Memphis, Chennai, Coral Springs, London, 's-Hertogenbosch, Canada Masters, Cincinnati Masters, Long Island, US Open)
- Chile 7 (Auckland, Indian Wells Masters, Miami Masters, Rome Masters, St. Poelten, Grand Slam Cup, Singapore)
- Sweden 6 (Marseille, Copenhagen, Munich, Nottingham, Båstad, Amsterdam)
- Czech Republic 4 (Doha, Australian Open, Umag, Mexico City)
- United Kingdom 4 (Antwerp, Tashkent, Basel, Paris Masters)
- Netherlands 4 (St. Petersburg, Rotterdam, Toulouse, Stuttgart Masters)
- Brazil 3 (Prague, Stuttgart, Mallorca)
- Russia 3 (London, Halle, Moscow)
- Slovakia 3 (Sydney, San Marino, New Haven)
- Argentina 2 (Palermo, Bogotá)
- Russia 2 (London, Halle)
- Croatia 1 (Split)
- Denmark 1 (Hong Kong)
- India 1 (Newport)
- Italy 1 (Casablanca)
- Romania 1 (Tokyo)

The following players won their first career title:

- (Denmark) Kenneth Carlsen – Hong Kong
- (Australia) Scott Draper – London
- (Italy) Andrea Gaudenzi – Casablanca
- (Australia) Lleyton Hewitt – Adelaide
- (Slovakia) Dominik Hrbatý – San Marino
- (Australia) Andrew Ilie – Coral Springs
- (India) Leander Paes – Newport
- (Romania) Andrei Pavel – Tokyo
- (Argentina) Mariano Puerta – Palermo
- (Argentina) Mariano Zabaleta – Bogotá

== See also ==
- 1998 WTA Tour – women's tour
- Association of Tennis Professionals
- International Tennis Federation
