= 1998 European Community Championships =

- Date: 16–22 February
- Edition: 16th
- Category: Championship Series
- Draw: 32S / 16D
- Prize money: $875,000
- Surface: Hard / indoor
- Location: Antwerp, Belgium

Champions

Singles
- (United Kingdom) Greg Rusedski

Doubles
- (South Africa) Wayne Ferreira / (Russia) Yevgeny Kafelnikov
- European Community Championships

The 1998 European Community Championships was a men's tennis tournament played on indoor hard courts in Antwerp, Belgium, that was part of the Championship Series of the 1998 ATP Tour. It was the sixteenth edition of the tournament and was held from 16 February to 22 February 1998. Fifth-seeded Greg Rusedski won the singles title.

== Finals ==
=== Singles ===
- (United Kingdom) Greg Rusedski defeated (Switzerland) Marc Rosset, 7–6^{(7–3)}, 3–6, 6–1, 6–4

=== Doubles ===
- (South Africa) Wayne Ferreira / (Russia) Yevgeny Kafelnikov defeated (Spain) Tomás Carbonell / (Spain) Francisco Roig, 7–5, 3–6, 6–2
