= 1998 Dubai Tennis Championships – Doubles =

Doubles
- 1998 Dubai Tennis Championships

Final
- Champions: (India) Mahesh Bhupathi (India) Leander Paes
- Runners-up: (United States) Donald Johnson (United States) Francisco Montana
- Score: 6–2, 7–5

Details
- Draw: 16
- Seeds: 4

Events
Singles	Doubles
← 1997 ·	Dubai Tennis Championships	· 1999 →

The 1998 Dubai Tennis Championships was a men's tennis tournaments played on outdoor hard courts at the Aviation Club Tennis Centre in Dubai in the United Arab Emirates that were part of the World Series of the 1998 ATP Tour. The tournament was held from 9 February through 15 February 1998.

== Seeds ==
Champion seeds are indicated in bold text while text in italics indicates the round in which those seeds were eliminated.

1. (India) **Mahesh Bhupathi** / (India) **Leander Paes (champions)**
2. (United States) Donald Johnson / (United States) Francisco Montana (final)
3. (United States) Patrick Galbraith / (New Zealand) Brett Steven (semifinals)
4. (Australia) Sandon Stolle / (Czech Republic) Cyril Suk (semifinals)

== Draw ==
=== Key ===
- Q = Qualifier
- WC = Wild card
- LL = Lucky loser
- Alt = Alternate
- ITF = ITF entry
- PR = Protected ranking
- SR = Special ranking
- SE = Special exempt
- JE = Junior exempt
- JR = Junior Accelerator Programme entrant
- CO = College Accelerator Programme entrant
- NG = Next Gen Accelerator Program entrant
- w/o = Walkover
- r = Retired
- d = Defaulted

=== Finals ===
First round
1	(India) **M Bhupathi** **(India) L Paes**	**7**	**6**
(United Kingdom) N Broad (South Africa) P Norval	6	4
(Australia) **J Eagle** **(Australia) A Florent**	**6**	**6**
(United States) J Grabb (Czech Republic) J Novák	2	3
3	(United States) **P Galbraith** **(New Zealand) B Steven**	**6**	**6**
(Netherlands) S Groen (Croatia) G Ivanišević	1	0
(North Macedonia) **A Kitinov** **(Czech Republic) P Vízner**	**7**	**7**
(Sweden) J Apell (Sweden) J Björkman	5	6
(Spain) **T Carbonell** **(Spain) F Roig**	**6**	**6**
(Belarus) M Mirnyi (United States) J Tarango	1	3
4	(Australia) **S Stolle** **(Czech Republic) C Suk**	**6**	**6**
(Argentina) P Albano (Sweden) P Nyborg	4	4
(Germany) **B Becker** **(United Kingdom) T Henman**	**6**	**6**
(Spain) À Corretja (Spain) J Sánchez	3	2
2	(United States) **D Johnson** **(United States) F Montana**	**6**	**6**
(Germany) N Kiefer (Chile) M Ríos	2	1

Quarterfinals
1	(India) **M Bhupathi** **(India) L Paes**	**6**	5	**6**
(Australia) J Eagle (Australia) A Florent	3	**7**	4
3	(United States) **P Galbraith** **(New Zealand) B Steven**	**6**	**6**
(North Macedonia) A Kitinov (Czech Republic) P Vízner	3	4
(Spain) T Carbonell (Spain) F Roig	4	2
4	(Australia) **S Stolle** **(Czech Republic) C Suk**	**6**	**6**
(Germany) B Becker (United Kingdom) T Henman
2	(United States) **D Johnson** **(United States) F Montana**	w/o

Semifinals
1	(India) **M Bhupathi** **(India) L Paes**	**6**	**6**
3	(United States) P Galbraith (New Zealand) B Steven	4	2
4	(Australia) S Stolle (Czech Republic) C Suk	3	5
2	(United States) **D Johnson** **(United States) F Montana**	**6**	**7**

Final
1	(India) **M Bhupathi** **(India) L Paes**	**6**	**7**
2	(United States) D Johnson (United States) F Montana	2	5
