= 1998 Mercedes Cup – Doubles =

Doubles
- 1998 Mercedes Cup

Final
- Champions: (France) Olivier Delaître (France) Fabrice Santoro
- Runners-up: (Australia) Joshua Eagle (United States) Jim Grabb
- Score: 6–1, 3–6, 6–3

Events
Singles	Doubles
← 1997 ·	Stuttgart Open	· 1999 →

The 1998 Mercedes Cup was a men's tennis tournament played on Clay in Stuttgart, Germany, that was part of the International Series Gold of the 1998 ATP Tour. It was the fiftieth edition of the tournament and was held 20 July – 26 July.

== Seeds ==
Champion seeds are indicated in bold text while text in italics indicates the round in which those seeds were eliminated.

1. (India) Mahesh Bhupathi / (Russia) Yevgeny Kafelnikov (semifinals)
2. (United States) Donald Johnson / (United States) Francisco Montana (second round)
3. (Australia) Joshua Eagle / (United States) Jim Grabb (final)
4. (Argentina) Daniel Orsanic / (Czech Republic) Cyril Suk (quarterfinals)
5. (United Kingdom) Neil Broad / (South Africa) Piet Norval (quarterfinals)
6. (South Africa) David Adams / (Netherlands) Fernon Wibier (second round)
7. (Australia) Andrew Kratzmann / (Netherlands) Menno Oosting (second round)
8. (Netherlands) Tom Kempers / (North Macedonia) Aleksandar Kitinov (quarterfinals)

== Draw ==
=== Key ===
- Q = Qualifier
- WC = Wild card
- LL = Lucky loser
- Alt = Alternate
- SE = Special exempt
- PR = Protected ranking
- ITF = ITF entry
- JE = Junior exempt
- w/o = Walkover
- r = Retired
- d = Defaulted
- SR = Special ranking

=== Finals ===
Semifinals
1	(India) Mahesh Bhupathi (Russia) Yevgeny Kafelnikov	**6**	3	6
(France) **Olivier Delaître** **(France) Fabrice Santoro**	3	**6**	**7**
3	(Australia) **Joshua Eagle** **(United States) Jim Grabb**	**6**	**7**
(South Africa) Chris Haggard (United States) Jack Waite	2	6

Final
(France) **Olivier Delaître** **(France) Fabrice Santoro**	**6**	3	**6**
3	(Australia) Joshua Eagle (United States) Jim Grabb	1	**6**	3

=== Top half ===
First round
(Argentina) **L Arnold** **(Argentina) L Lobo**	**6**	**6**
(Sweden) M Gustafsson (Sweden) M Larsson	4	2
(Russia) **A Olhovskiy** **(Czech Republic) P Vízner**	6	**6**	**7**
(Germany) T Haas (Russia) M Safin	**7**	4	5
(Spain) **J Balcells** **(United States) D Bowen**	**6**	2	**6**
(Brazil) G Kuerten (Brazil) F Meligeni	1	**6**	2
(France) **O Delaître** **(France) F Santoro**	2	**6**	**6**
(Argentina) M Hood (Argentina) S Prieto	**6**	4	3

Second round
1	(India) **M Bhupathi** **(Russia) Y Kafelnikov**	**6**	**7**
(Argentina) L Arnold (Argentina) L Lobo	2	5
(Russia) A Olhovskiy (Czech Republic) P Vízner	5	4
8	(Netherlands) **T Kempers** **(North Macedonia) A Kitinov**	**7**	**6**
4	(Argentina) **D Orsanic** **(Czech Republic) C Suk**	**7**	4	**7**
(Spain) J Balcells (United States) D Bowen	6	**6**	5
(France) **O Delaître** **(France) F Santoro**	**6**	**6**
6	(South Africa) D Adams (Netherlands) F Wibier	4	2

Quarterfinals
1	(India) **M Bhupathi** **(Russia) Y Kafelnikov**	**7**	**7**
8	(Netherlands) T Kempers (North Macedonia) A Kitinov	6	6
4	(Argentina) D Orsanic (Czech Republic) C Suk	1	**6**	5
(France) **O Delaître** **(France) F Santoro**	**6**	0	**7**

Semifinals
1	(India) M Bhupathi (Russia) Y Kafelnikov	**6**	3	6
(France) **O Delaître** **(France) F Santoro**	3	**6**	**7**

=== Bottom half ===
First round
(Belgium) **L Pimek** **(Czech Republic) T Anzari**	**6**	**7**
(United States) B Coupe (South Africa) P Rosner	1	5
(Spain) **J Alonso** **(Hungary) G Köves**	**6**	**6**
(Spain) A Berasategui (Spain) A Martín	2	1
(Germany) **K Braasch** **(Germany) B Karbacher**	**6**	**6**
(Argentina) P Albano (Ecuador) N Lapentti	4	0
(South Africa) **C Haggard** **(United States) J Waite**	**7**	**6**
(Germany) B Becker (Germany) D Prinosil	6	4

Second round
5	(United Kingdom) **N Broad** **(South Africa) P Norval**	**6**	**6**
(Belgium) L Pimek (Czech Republic) T Anzari	3	4
(Spain) J Alonso (Hungary) G Köves	4	2
3	(Australia) **J Eagle** **(United States) J Grabb**	**6**	**6**
7	(Australia) A Kratzmann (Netherlands) M Oosting	**6**	5	3
(Germany) **K Braasch** **(Germany) B Karbacher**	4	**7**	**6**
(South Africa) **C Haggard** **(United States) J Waite**	1	**7**	**6**
2	(United States) Donald Johnson (United States) F Montana	**6**	5	2

Quarterfinals
5	(United Kingdom) N Broad (South Africa) P Norval	4	**6**	4
3	(Australia) **J Eagle** **(United States) J Grabb**	**6**	4	**6**
(Germany) K Braasch (Germany) B Karbacher	3	5
(South Africa) **C Haggard** **(United States) J Waite**	**6**	**7**

Semifinals
3	(Australia) **J Eagle** **(United States) J Grabb**	**6**	**7**
(South Africa) C Haggard (United States) J Waite	2	6
