= 1998 Eurocard Open =

- Date: 26 October – 2 November
- Edition: 3rd
- Category: ATP Super 9
- Prize money: $2,200,000
- Surface: Hard / indoor
- Location: Stuttgart, Germany
- Venue: Schleyerhalle

Champions

Singles
- (Netherlands) Richard Krajicek

Doubles
- (Canada) Sébastien Lareau / (United States) Alex O'Brien
- Eurocard Open

The 1998 Stuttgart Masters (known as the Eurocard Open for sponsorship reasons) was a tennis tournament played on indoor hard courts. It was the 3rd edition of the Stuttgart Masters, and was part of the ATP Super 9 of the 1998 ATP Tour. It took place at the Schleyerhalle in Stuttgart, Germany, from 26 October until 2 November 1998. Richard Krajicek won the singles title.

== Finals ==
=== Singles ===
(Netherlands) Richard Krajicek defeated (Russia) Yevgeny Kafelnikov 6–4, 6–3, 6–3

- It was Krajicek's 2nd title of the year and his 15th overall. It was his 1st Masters title of the year, and overall.

=== Doubles ===
(Canada) Sébastien Lareau / (United States) Alex O'Brien defeated (India) Mahesh Bhupati / (India) Leander Paes, 4–6, 6–3, 7–5

== See also ==
- 1998 Mercedes Cup – Stuttgart outdoor tournament
