= 1998 Mercedes Cup – Singles =

Singles
- 1998 Mercedes Cup

Final
- Champion: (Brazil) Gustavo Kuerten
- Runner-up: (Slovakia) Karol Kučera
- Score: 4–6, 6–2, 6–4

Details
- Draw: 48
- Seeds: 16

Events
Singles	Doubles
- Mercedes Cup

The 1998 Mercedes Cup was a men's tennis tournament played on clay courts in Stuttgart, Germany, that was part of the International Series Gold of the 1998 ATP Tour. It was the fiftieth edition of the tournament and was held 20 July – 26 July. Gustavo Kuerten, who was seeded 13th, won the singles title, by defeating Karol Kučera 4–6, 6–2, 6–4 in the final.

== Seeds ==
Champion seeds are indicated in bold text while text in italics indicates the round in which those seeds were eliminated.

1. (Chile) Marcelo Ríos (semifinals)
2. (Spain) Carlos Moyá (quarterfinals)
3. (Spain) Àlex Corretja (second round)
4. (Russia) Yevgeny Kafelnikov (second round)
5. (Slovakia) Karol Kučera (finale)
6. (Spain) Albert Costa (quarterfinals)
7. (Germany) Félix Mantilla (third round)
8. (Spain) Alberto Berasategui (second round)
9. (France) Cédric Pioline (second round)
10. (Austria) Thomas Muster (second round)
11. (Sweden) Magnus Gustafsson (third round)
12. (France) Fabrice Santoro (second round)
13. **(Brazil) Gustavo Kuerten (champion)**
14. (Spain) Francisco Clavet (third round)
15. (Sweden) Hendrik Dreekmann (second round)
16. (France) Nicolas Escudé (second round)

== Draw ==
Key

- Q = Qualifier
- WC = Wild card
- LL = Lucky loser
- Alt = Alternate
- ITF = ITF entry
- PR = Protected ranking
- SR = Special ranking
- SE = Special exempt
- JE = Junior exempt
- JR = Junior Accelerator Programme entrant
- CO = College Accelerator Programme entrant
- NG = Next Gen Accelerator Program entrant
- w/o = Walkover
- r = Retired
- d = Defaulted

=== Finals ===
Semifinals
1	(Chile) Marcelo Ríos	1	**7**	4
5	**(Slovakia) Karol Kučera**	**6**	6	**6**
13	**(Brazil) Gustavo Kuerten**	**7**	**6**
2	(Spain) Carlos Moyá	6	4

Final
5	(Slovakia) Karol Kučera	**6**	2	4
13	**(Brazil) Gustavo Kuerten**	4	**6**	**6**

=== Top half ===
==== Section 1 ====
First round
**(Germany) J Knippschild**	3	**6**	**6**
(Germany) M Kohlmann	**6**	3	3
**(Germany) H Dreekmann**	**6**	**6**
(Sweden) M Tillström	3	0
**(Germany) B Becker**	**6**	**7**
(Italy) A Gaudenzi	1	5
**(Australia) R Fromberg**	**7**	**6**
(Costa Rica) JA Marín	6	1

Second round
1	**(Chile) M Ríos**	**7**	**6**
(Germany) J Knippschild	6	2
**(Germany) H Dreekmann**	**6**	**7**
15	(Sweden) M Larsson	4	5
9	(France) C Pioline	6	1
**(Germany) B Becker**	**7**	**6**
(Australia) R Fromberg	6	5
7	**(Spain) F Mantilla**	**7**	**7**

Third round
1	**(Chile) M Ríos**	**6**	**6**
(Germany) H Dreekmann	3	4
**(Germany) B Becker**	**7**	**7**
7	(Spain) F Mantilla	6	5

Quarterfinals
1	**(Chile) M Ríos**	**6**	**6**
(Germany) B Becker	2	0

==== Section 2 ====
First round
**(Czech Republic) B Ulihrach**	**7**	**6**
(France) S Grosjean	5	2
**(Spain) G Blanco**	2	**7**	**6**
(Russia) M Safin	**6**	6	2
**(Germany) T Haas**	**7**	**7**
(Germany) M-K Goellner	6	5
**(Czech Republic) C Doseděl**	**6**	**6**
(Switzerland) M Rosset	3	4

Second round
4	(Russia) Y Kafelnikov	3	**6**	3
**(Czech Republic) B Ulihrach**	**6**	3	**6**
(Spain) G Blanco	6	5
14	**(Spain) F Clavet**	**7**	**7**
11	**(Sweden) M Gustafsson**	**6**	**6**
(Germany) T Haas	3	1
(Czech Republic) C Doseděl	1	1
5	**(Slovakia) K Kučera**	**6**	**6**

Third round
**(Czech Republic) B Ulihrach**	**7**	**6**
14	(Spain) F Clavet	6	2
11	(Sweden) M Gustafsson	1	3
5	**(Slovakia) K Kučera**	**6**	**6**

Quarterfinals
(Czech Republic) B Ulihrach	4	4
5	**(Slovakia) K Kučera**	**6**	**6**

=== Bottom half ===
==== Section 3 ====
First round
**(Argentina) F Squillari**	**6**	3	**6**
(Ecuador) N Lapentti	2	**6**	1
**(Spain) A Portas**	**7**	**6**
(Sweden) T Johansson	6	4
**(Brazil) F Meligeni**	3	**6**	**6**
(Germany) D Prinosil	**6**	4	4
**(Spain) C Costa**	**6**	**6**
(Czech Republic) R Vašek	2	0

Second round
6	**(Spain) A Costa**	**6**	**6**
(Argentina) F Squillari	3	4
**(Spain) A Portas**	1	**6**	**7**
12	(France) F Santoro	**6**	2	6
13	**(Brazil) G Kuerten**	**7**	**6**
(Brazil) F Meligeni	6	4
**(Spain) C Costa**	**7**	6	**7**
3	(Spain) À Corretja	6	**7**	5

Third round
6	**(Spain) A Costa**	**6**	**6**
(Spain) A Portas	1	3
13	**(Brazil) G Kuerten**	**6**	**6**
(Spain) C Costa	2	4

Quarterfinals
6	(Spain) A Costa	5	0
13	**(Brazil) G Kuerten**	**7**	**6**

==== Section 4 ====
First round
**(France) G Raoux**	**6**	**7**
(Italy) D Sanguinetti	2	6
**(Spain) F Vicente**	6	**7**	**4**
(Italy) M Meneschincheri	**7**	5	0R
**(Slovakia) D Hrbatý**	**6**	**6**
(Sweden) M Norman	3	2
**(Spain) J Alonso**	**6**	**6**
(Spain) S Bruguera	4	2

Second round
8	(Spain) A Berasategui	1	2
**(France) G Raoux**	**6**	**6**
**(Spain) F Vicente**	**6**	6	**7**
10	(Austria) T Muster	3	**7**	5
16	(France) N Escudé	**6**	3	3
**(Slovakia) D Hrbatý**	2	**6**	**6**
(Spain) J Alonso	6	5
2	**(Spain) C Moyá**	**7**	**7**

Third round
(France) G Raoux	**7**	3	2
**(Spain) F Vicente**	6	**6**	**6**
(Slovakia) D Hrbatý	2	2
2	**(Spain) C Moyá**	**6**	**6**

Quarterfinals
(Spain) F Vicente	**6**	3	2
2	**(Spain) C Moyá**	3	**6**	**6**
