= 1998 Mercedes Cup =

- Date: 20–26 July
- Edition: 50th
- Category: International Series Gold
- Draw: 48S / 24D
- Prize money: $915,000
- Surface: Clay / outdoor
- Location: Stuttgart, Germany
- Venue: Tennis Club Weissenhof

Champions

Singles
- (Brazil) Gustavo Kuerten

Doubles
- (France) Olivier Delaître / (France) Fabrice Santoro
- Stuttgart Open

The 1998 Mercedes Cup was a men's tennis tournament played on clay courts at the Tennis Club Weissenhof in Stuttgart, Germany, that was part of the International Series Gold of the 1998 ATP Tour. It was the fiftieth edition of the tournament and was held from 20 July until 26 July. Gustavo Kuerten won the singles title.

== Finals ==
=== Singles ===
(Brazil) Gustavo Kuerten defeated (Slovakia) Karol Kučera, 4–6, 6–2, 6–4.

=== Doubles ===
(France) Olivier Delaître / (France) Fabrice Santoro defeated (Australia) Joshua Eagle / (United States) Jim Grabb, 6–1, 3–6, 6–3.

== See also ==
- 1998 Eurocard Open – Stuttgart indoor tournament
