= 1998 European Community Championships – Doubles =

Doubles
- 1998 European Community Championships

Final
- Champions: (South Africa) Wayne Ferreira (Russia) Yevgeny Kafelnikov
- Runners-up: (Spain) Tomás Carbonell (Spain) Francisco Roig
- Score: 7–5, 3–6, 6–2

Details
- Draw: 16
- Seeds: 4

Events
| Singles | Doubles |
- European Community Championships

The 1998 European Community Championships was a men's tennis tournament played on hard courts in Antwerp, Belgium, that was part of the Championship Series of the 1998 ATP Tour. It was the sixteenth edition of the tournament and was held 16–22 February 1998.

== Seeds ==
Champion seeds are indicated in bold text while text in italics indicates the round in which those seeds were eliminated.

1. Unknown (withdrew)
2. (United States) Patrick Galbraith / (New Zealand) Brett Steven (quarterfinals)
3. Unknown (withdrew)
4. (South Africa) David Adams / (Czechoslovakia) Libor Pimek (first round)

== Draw ==
Key

- Q = Qualifier
- WC = Wild card
- LL = Lucky loser
- Alt = Alternate
- ITF = ITF entry
- PR = Protected ranking
- SR = Special ranking
- SE = Special exempt
- JE = Junior exempt
- JR = Junior Accelerator Programme entrant
- CO = College Accelerator Programme entrant
- NG = Next Gen Accelerator Program entrant
- w/o = Walkover
- r = Retired
- d = Defaulted

=== Finals ===
First round
(Belgium) **F Dewulf** **(Belgium) J Van Herck** | **6** | **6**
(Netherlands) S Groen (Belgium) T Vanhoudt | 4 | 3
(Spain) **T Carbonell** **(Spain) F Roig** | 6 | **7** | **6**
(Netherlands) S Noteboom (South Africa) B Talbot | **7** | 6 | 0
(Czechoslovakia) **M Damm** **(United States) J Grabb** | 6 | **6** | **7**
(United Kingdom) N Broad (South Africa) P Norval | **7** | 2 | 5
(North Macedonia) **A Kitinov** **(Czech Republic) P Vízner** | **6** | **7**
(Argentina) P Albano (Sweden) P Nyborg | 3 | 5
(Czech Republic) **J Novák** **(Netherlands) F Wibier** | **7** | **6**
(Germany) M-K Goellner (Germany) N Kiefer | 5 | 2
(South Africa) **W Ferreira** **(Russia) Y Kafelnikov** | **7** | **6**
4 | (South Africa) D Adams (Czechoslovakia) L Pimek | 6 | 3
(Australia) **J Eagle** **(Australia) A Florent** | 4 | **6** | **7**
(South Africa) J-L de Jager (South Africa) R Koenig | **6** | 4 | 6
2 | (United States) **P Galbraith** **(New Zealand) B Steven** | **6** | **7**
(United Kingdom) T Henman (Switzerland) M Rosset | 3 | 5

Quarterfinals
(Belgium) F Dewulf (Belgium) J Van Herck | 4 | 1
(Spain) **T Carbonell** **(Spain) F Roig** | **6** | **6**
(Czechoslovakia) **M Damm** **(United States) J Grabb** | **6** | **7**
(North Macedonia) A Kitinov (Czech Republic) P Vízner | 3 | 5
(Czech Republic) J Novák (Netherlands) F Wibier | 5 | 1
(South Africa) **W Ferreira** **(Russia) Y Kafelnikov** | **7** | **6**
(Australia) **J Eagle** **(Australia) A Florent** | **6** | **6**
2 | (United States) P Galbraith (New Zealand) B Steven | 1 | 2

Semifinals
(Spain) **T Carbonell** **(Spain) F Roig** | **7** | 3 | **7**
(Czechoslovakia) M Damm (United States) J Grabb | 6 | **6** | 6
(South Africa) **W Ferreira** **(Russia) Y Kafelnikov** | **6** | **6**
(Australia) J Eagle (Australia) A Florent | 4 | 3

Final
(Spain) T Carbonell (Spain) F Roig | 5 | **6** | 2
(South Africa) **W Ferreira** **(Russia) Y Kafelnikov** | **7** | 3 | **6**
