= 1998 Dubai Tennis Championships =

- Date: 9–15 February
- Edition: 6th
- Category: World Series
- Draw: 32S / 16D
- Prize money: $1,014,250
- Surface: Hard / outdoor
- Location: Dubai, United Arab Emirates
- Venue: Aviation Club Tennis Centre

Champions

Singles
- (Spain) Àlex Corretja

Doubles
- (India) Mahesh Bhupathi / (India) Leander Paes
- Dubai Tennis Championships

The 1998 Dubai Tennis Championships was a men's tennis tournaments played on outdoor hard courts at the Aviation Club Tennis Centre in Dubai in the United Arab Emirates that were part of the World Series of the 1998 ATP Tour. The tournament was held from 9 February through 15 February 1998. Fourth-seeded Àlex Corretja won the singles title.

== Finals ==
=== Singles ===
(Spain) Àlex Corretja defeated (Spain) Félix Mantilla 7–6^{(7–0)}, 6–1

- It was Corretja's 1st title of the year and the 5th of his career.

=== Doubles ===
(India) Mahesh Bhupathi / (India) Leander Paes defeated (United States) Donald Johnson / (United States) Francisco Montana 6–2, 7–5

- It was Bhupathi's 2nd title of the year and the 8th of his career. It was Paes' 2nd title of the year and the 8th of his career.
