= 1998 European Community Championships – Singles =

Singles
- 1998 European Community Championships

Final
- Champion: (United Kingdom) Greg Rusedski
- Runner-up: (Switzerland) Marc Rosset
- Score: 7–6^{(7–3)}, 3–6, 6–1, 6–4

Details
- Draw: 32
- Seeds: 8

Events
Singles	Doubles
- European Community Championships

The 1998 European Community Championships was a men's tennis tournament played on hard courts in Antwerp, Belgium, that was part of the Championship Series of the 1998 ATP Tour. It was the sixteenth edition of the tournament and was held 16–22 February 1998.

== Seeds ==
Champion seeds are indicated in bold text while text in italics indicates the round in which those seeds were eliminated.

1. (Czech Republic) Petr Korda (quarterfinals)
2. (Australia) Patrick Rafter (semifinals)
3. (Sweden) Jonas Björkman (first round)
4. (Russia) Yevgeny Kafelnikov (second round)
5. (United Kingdom) **Greg Rusedski (champion)**
6. (Croatia) Goran Ivanišević (first round)
7. (Slovakia) Karol Kučera (semifinals)
8. (United Kingdom) Tim Henman (first round)

== Draw ==
Key

- Q = Qualifier
- WC = Wild card
- LL = Lucky loser
- Alt = Alternate
- ITF = ITF entry
- PR = Protected ranking
- SR = Special ranking
- SE = Special exempt
- JE = Junior exempt
- JR = Junior Accelerator Programme entrant
- CO = College Accelerator Programme entrant
- NG = Next Gen Accelerator Program entrant
- w/o = Walkover
- r = Retired
- d = Defaulted

=== Finals ===
Semifinals
7	(Slovakia) Karol Kučera	4	3
5	**(United Kingdom) Greg Rusedski**	**6**	**6**
**(Switzerland) Marc Rosset**	**7**	**7**
2	(Australia) Patrick Rafter	6^{4}	6^{2}

Final
**(United Kingdom) Greg Rusedski**	**7**	3	**6**
(Switzerland) Marc Rosset	6^{3}	**6**	1

=== Top half ===
First round
1	**(Czech Republic) P Korda**	**6**	**6**
(South Africa) W Ferreira	3	3
**(Spain) A Portas**	6^{4}	**7**	**6**
(Slovakia) D Hrbatý	**7**	6^{1}	4
**(Czech Republic) B Ulihrach**	**6**	**6**
(France) F Santoro	2	4
7	**(Slovakia) K Kučera**	6^{3}	**6**	**6**
(Belgium) J Van Herck	**7**	4	2
**(Sweden) T Johansson**	**6**	**6**
3	(Sweden) J Björkman	1	2
**(Czech Republic) M Damm**	4	**7**	**6**
(Belgium) F Dewulf	**6**	6^{6}	4
**(France) G Raoux**	**7**	5	**6**
(Spain) F Clavet	6^{4}	**7**	2
5	**(United Kingdom) G Rusedski**	**7**	3	**6**
(Morocco) H Arazi	6^{4}	**6**	3

Second round
1	**(Czech Republic) P Korda**	**7**	**6**
(Spain) A Portas	5	2
(Czech Republic) B Ulihrach	1	1
7	**(Slovakia) K Kučera**	**6**	**6**
**(Sweden) T Johansson**	**6**	**6**
(Czech Republic) M Damm	2	4
(France) G Raoux	6^{13}	**6**	6^{13}
5	**(United Kingdom) G Rusedski**	**7**	3	**7**

Quarterfinals
1	(Czech Republic) P Korda	**6**	4	2
7	**(Slovakia) K Kučera**	3	**6**	**6**
(Sweden) T Johansson	3	**6**	4
5	**(United Kingdom) G Rusedski**	**6**	4	**6**

Semifinals
7	(Slovakia) K Kučera	4	3
5	**(United Kingdom) G Rusedski**	**6**	**6**

=== Bottom half ===
First round
**(Netherlands) J Siemerink**	**6**	**6**
6	(Croatia) G Ivanišević	4	3
**(Sweden) M Larsson**	**6**	**6**
(Germany) M-K Goellner	2	1
**(Switzerland) M Rosset**	**7**	4	**7**
(Germany) N Kiefer	6^{3}	**6**	6^{5}
4	**(Russia) Y Kafelnikov**	**7**	5	**6**
(Czech Republic) J Novák	5	**7**	3
**(Sweden) M Norman**	**7**	**6**
8	(United Kingdom) T Henman	5	3
**(United States) J Tarango**	3	**6**	**6**
(Belgium) D Norman	**6**	4	3
**(France) C Pioline**	**6**	**7**
(Sweden) M Gustafsson	4	6^{5}
2	**(Australia) P Rafter**	**6**	**7**
(France) A Boetsch	2	6^{8}

Second round
(Netherlands) J Siemerink	3	3
**(Sweden) M Larsson**	**6**	**6**
**(Switzerland) M Rosset**	3	**6**	**6**
4	(Russia) Y Kafelnikov	**6**	4	3
(Sweden) M Norman	6^{2}	2
**(United States) J Tarango**	**7**	**6**
(France) C Pioline	4	6^{2}
2	**(Australia) P Rafter**	**6**	**7**

Quarterfinals
(Sweden) M Larsson
**(Switzerland) M Rosset**	w/o
(United States) J Tarango	**7**	2	1
2	**(Australia) P Rafter**	6^{1}	**6**	**6**

Semifinals
**(Switzerland) M Rosset**	**7**	**7**
2	(Australia) P Rafter	6^{4}	6^{2}
