= 1998 Eurocard Open – Singles =

Singles
- 1998 Eurocard Open

Final
- Champion: (Netherlands) Richard Krajicek
- Runner-up: (Russia) Yevgeny Kafelnikov
- Score: 6–4, 6–3, 6–3

Details
- Draw: 48
- Seeds: 16

Events
Singles	Doubles
- Eurocard Open

Richard Krajicek defeated Yevgeny Kafelnikov in the final, 6–4, 6–3, 6–3 to win the singles tennis title at the 1998 Eurocard Open.

Petr Korda was the defending champion, but lost in the second round to Thomas Johansson.

== Seeds ==
A champion seed is indicated in bold text while text in italics indicates the round in which that seed was eliminated. All sixteen seeds received a bye into the second round.

1. (United States) Pete Sampras (semifinals)
2. (Chile) Marcelo Ríos (quarterfinals)
3. (Australia) Patrick Rafter (third round)
4. (Spain) Carlos Moyá (second round)
5. (Czech Republic) Petr Korda (second round)
6. (United States) Andre Agassi (third round)
7. (Spain) Álex Corretja (second round)
8. (Slovakia) Karol Kučera (second round)
9. (United Kingdom) Tim Henman (third round)
10. (Russia) Yevgeny Kafelnikov (final)
11. (Netherlands) **Richard Krajicek (champion)**
12. (Sweden) Jonas Björkman (semifinals)
13. (United Kingdom) Greg Rusedski (quarterfinals)
14. (Croatia) Goran Ivanišević (quarterfinals)
15. (Netherlands) Jan Siemerink (third round)
16. (Spain) Álbert Costa (second round)

== Draw ==
Key

- Q = Qualifier
- WC = Wild card
- LL = Lucky loser
- Alt = Alternate
- ITF = ITF entry
- PR = Protected ranking
- SR = Special ranking
- SE = Special exempt
- JE = Junior exempt
- JR = Junior Accelerator Programme entrant
- CO = College Accelerator Programme entrant
- NG = Next Gen Accelerator Program entrant
- w/o = Walkover
- r = Retired
- d = Defaulted

=== Finals ===
Quarterfinals
1	**(United States) Pete Sampras**	**4**
(United States) Jan-Michael Gambill	1	r
14	(Croatia) Goran Ivanišević	6^{3}	6^{5}
11	**(Netherlands) Richard Krajicek**	**7^{7}**	**7^{7}**
12	**(Sweden) Jonas Björkman**	**6**	**6**
13	(United Kingdom) Greg Rusedski	3	2
10	**(Russia) Yevgeny Kafelnikov**	**w/o**
2	(Chile) Marcelo Ríos

Semifinals
1	(United States) Pete Sampras	**7^{7}**	4	6^{5}
11	(Netherlands) **Richard Krajicek**	6^{2}	**6**	**7^{7}**
12	(Sweden) Jonas Björkman	2	5
10	(Russia) **Yevgeny Kafelnikov**	**6**	**7**

Final
11	(Netherlands) **Richard Krajicek**	**6**	**6**	**6**
10	(Russia) Yevgeny Kafelnikov	4	3	3

=== Top half ===
==== Section 1 ====
First round
(Zimbabwe) B Black	**6**	6^{5}	6^{0}
(Germany) **N Kiefer**	4	**7^{7}**	**7^{7}**
(Czech Republic) **B Ulihrach**	3	**7^{7}**	**6**
(Australia) R Fromberg	**6**	6^{3}	4
Q	(Australia) **M Woodforde**	**6**	2	**7^{7}**
(Morocco) H Arazi	2	**6**	6^{4}
(Czech Republic) D Vacek	3	**6**	3
(United States) **J-M Gambill**	**6**	4	**6**

Second round
1	(United States) **P Sampras**	**6**	**6**
(Germany) N Kiefer	3	4
(Czech Republic) **B Ulihrach**	**6**	**6**
16	(Spain) Á Costa	2	2
9	(United Kingdom) **T Henman**	**7**	**6**
Q	(Australia) M Woodforde	5	1
(United States) **J-M Gambill**	**6**	**6**
7	(Spain) Á Corretja	2	4

Third round
1	(United States) **P Sampras**	**6**	**6**
(Czech Republic) B Ulihrach	3	3
9	(United Kingdom) T Henman	6^{2}	**6**	6^{5}
(United States) **J-M Gambill**	**7^{7}**	1	**7^{7}**

Quarterfinals
1	(United States) **P Sampras**	**4**
(United States) J-M Gambill	1	r

==== Section 2 ====
First round
WC	(Germany) **B Becker**	**6**	**7**
Q	(Netherlands) S Schalken	2	5
(South Africa) **W Ferreira**	**6**	3	**7**
(United States) V Spadea	2	**6**	5
WC	(Switzerland) M Rosset	6^{5}	**6**	4
(Sweden) **M Norman**	**7^{7}**	3	**6**
LL	(Romania) **A Pavel**	**7**	**6**
Q	(Netherlands) P Haarhuis	5	3

Second round
4	(Spain) C Moyà	**7^{7}**	4	4
WC	(Germany) **B Becker**	6^{4}	**6**	**6**
(South Africa) W Ferreira	4	6^{6}
14	(Croatia) **G Ivanišević**	**6**	**7^{8}**
11	(Netherlands) **R Krajicek**	**6**	**6**
(Sweden) M Norman	4	1
LL	(Romania) A Pavel	1	**7^{7}**	3
6	(United States) **A Agassi**	**6**	6^{4}	**6**

Third round
WC	(Germany) B Becker	6^{5}	6^{5}
14	(Croatia) **G Ivanišević**	**7^{7}**	**7^{7}**
11	(Netherlands) **R Krajicek**	**6**	**6**
6	(United States) A Agassi	3	4

Quarterfinals
14	(Croatia) G Ivanišević	6^{3}	6^{5}
11	(Netherlands) **R Krajicek**	**7^{7}**	**7^{7}**

=== Bottom half ===
==== Section 3 ====
First round
Q	(Czech Republic) M Damm	**7**	3	2
(Sweden) **T Johansson**	5	**6**	**6**
Q	(Italy) **G Pozzi**	**7^{7}**	**6**
LL	(United States) J Stark	6^{4}	3
WC	(Germany) D Prinosil	6^{5}	1
(Australia) **J Stoltenberg**	**7^{7}**	**6**
WC	(Germany) O Gross	0	3
(Sweden) **M Gustafsson**	**6**	**6**

Second round
5	(Czech Republic) P Korda	2	4
(Sweden) **T Johansson**	**6**	**6**
Q	(Italy) G Pozzi	4	**6**	2
12	(Sweden) **J Björkman**	**6**	3	**6**
13	(United Kingdom) **G Rusedski**	**7^{7}**	6^{2}	**7^{7}**
(Australia) J Stoltenberg	6^{5}	**7^{7}**	6^{4}
(Sweden) M Gustafsson	1	4
3	(Australia) **P Rafter**	**6**	**6**

Third round
(Sweden) T Johansson	**6**	4	2
12	(Sweden) **J Björkman**	2	**6**	**6**
13	(United Kingdom) **G Rusedski**	**7^{7}**	6^{5}	**6**
3	(Australia) P Rafter	6^{4}	**7^{7}**	4

Quarterfinals
12	(Sweden) **J Björkman**	**6**	**6**
13	(United Kingdom) G Rusedski	3	2

==== Section 4 ====
First round
(United States) **T Martin**	**6**	**6**
LL	(Canada) S Lareau	3	3
(France) F Santoro	1	**7**	2
(Australia) **M Philippoussis**	**6**	5	**6**
(France) **G Raoux**	**7^{7}**	**6**
(United States) M Chang	6^{5}	3
(Germany) **T Haas**	**6**	**6**
LL	(South Africa) D Nainkin	4	4

Second round
8	(Slovakia) K Kučera	2	4
(United States) **T Martin**	**6**	**6**
(Australia) M Philippoussis	**6**	4	6^{4}
10	(Russia) **Y Kafelnikov**	4	**6**	**7^{7}**
15	(Netherlands) **J Siemerink**	6^{3}	**7^{7}**	**6**
(France) G Raoux	**7^{7}**	6^{5}	3
(Germany) T Haas	3	5
2	(Chile) **M Ríos**	**6**	**7**

Third round
(United States) T Martin	4	5
10	(Russia) **Y Kafelnikov**	**6**	**7**
15	(Netherlands) J Siemerink	2	r
2	(Chile) **M Ríos**	**6**

Quarterfinals
10	(Russia) **Y Kafelnikov**	**w/o**
2	(Chile) M Ríos
