= 1998 Eurocard Open – Doubles =

Doubles
- 1998 Eurocard Open

Final
- Champions: (Canada) Sébastien Lareau (United States) Alex O'Brien
- Runners-up: (India) Mahesh Bhupati (India) Leander Paes
- Score: 4–6, 6–3, 7–5

Details
- Draw: 24
- Seeds: 8

Events
Singles	Doubles
- Eurocard Open

Todd Woodbridge and Mark Woodforde were the defending champion, but lost in the quarterfinals to Saša Hiršzon and Goran Ivanišević.

Sébastien Lareau and Alex O'Brien won the title, by defeating Mahesh Bhupathi and Leander Paes 4–6, 6–3, 7–5 in the final.

== Seeds ==
Champion seeds are indicated in bold text while text in italics indicates the round in which those seeds were eliminated.

1. (Netherlands) Jacco Eltingh / (Netherlands) Paul Haarhuis (quarterfinals)
2. (Australia) Todd Woodbridge / (Australia) Mark Woodforde (quarterfinals)
3. (India) Mahesh Bhupathi / (India) Leander Paes (final)
4. (The Bahamas) Mark Knowles / (Canada) Daniel Nestor (second round)
5. (South Africa) Ellis Ferreira / (United States) Rick Leach (second round)
6. (Australia) Sandon Stolle / (Czech Republic) Cyril Suk (second round)
7. Unknown (withdrew)
8. (United States) Donald Johnson / (United States) Francisco Montana (second round)

== Draw ==
Key

- Q = Qualifier
- WC = Wild card
- LL = Lucky loser
- Alt = Alternate
- ITF = ITF entry
- PR = Protected ranking
- SR = Special ranking
- SE = Special exempt
- JE = Junior exempt
- JR = Junior Accelerator Programme entrant
- CO = College Accelerator Programme entrant
- NG = Next Gen Accelerator Program entrant
- w/o = Walkover
- r = Retired
- d = Defaulted

=== Finals ===
Semifinals
(France) Olivier Delaître (France) Fabrice Santoro	4	4
3	(India) **Mahesh Bhupathi** **(India) Leander Paes**	**6**	**6**
(Canada) **Sébastien Lareau** **(United States) Alex O'Brien**	**6**	**6**
(Croatia) Saša Hiršzon (Croatia) Goran Ivanišević	2	3

Final
3	(India) Mahesh Bhupathi (India) Leander Paes	3	**6**	5
(Canada) **Sébastien Lareau** **(United States) Alex O'Brien**	**6**	3	**7**

=== Top half ===
First round
(United Kingdom) **N Broad** **(South Africa) R Koenig**	**7**	**7**
(Australia) J Eagle (Australia) A Florent	6	6
(France) **O Delaître** **(France) F Santoro**	**7**	**6**
(South Africa) P Norval (Zimbabwe) K Ullyett	6	3
(Germany) **M-K Goellner** **(Germany) D Prinosil**	**7**	6	**6**
(United States) R Reneberg (United States) J Stark	6	**7**	3
(Russia) **Y Kafelnikov** **(Czech Republic) D Vacek**	**6**	**7**
(Zimbabwe) B Black (South Africa) C Haggard	3	6

Second round
1	(Netherlands) **J Eltingh** **(Netherlands) P Haarhuis**	**6**	**6**
(United Kingdom) N Broad (South Africa) R Koenig	4	4
(France) **O Delaître** **(France) F Santoro**	**6**	**6**
(Czech Republic) M Damm (United States) J Grabb	1	4
3	(India) **M Bhupathi** **(India) L Paes**	**7**	**6**
(Germany) M-K Goellner (Germany) D Prinosil	5	3
(Russia) **Y Kafelnikov** **(Czech Republic) D Vacek**	**7**	**6**
5	(South Africa) E Ferreira (United States) R Leach	6	4

Quarterfinals
1	(Netherlands) J Eltingh (Netherlands) P Haarhuis	3	3
(France) **O Delaître** **(France) F Santoro**	**6**	**6**
3	(India) **M Bhupathi** **(India) L Paes**	**6**	**6**
(Russia) Y Kafelnikov (Czech Republic) D Vacek	4	4

Semifinals
(France) O Delaître (France) F Santoro	4	4
3	(India) **M Bhupathi** **(India) L Paes**	**6**	**6**

=== Bottom half ===
First round
(Canada) **S Lareau** **(United States) A O'Brien**	**6**	4	**6**
(United States) A Agassi (Germany) B Becker	4	**6**	4
(Germany) **T Haas** **(Germany) N Kiefer**	6	**7**	**7**
(South Africa) D Adams (South Africa) J-L de Jager	**7**	5	6
(Croatia) **S Hiršzon** **(Croatia) G Ivanišević**	**6**	3	**7**
(Argentina) L Lobo (Spain) J Sánchez	4	**6**	5
(Sweden) **J Björkman** **(Sweden) P Nyborg**	**6**	**7**
(Sweden) N Kulti (Australia) D Macpherson	3	5

Second round
6	(Australia) S Stolle (Czech Republic) C Suk	4	3
(Canada) **S Lareau** **(United States) A O'Brien**	**6**	**6**
(Germany) **T Haas** **(Germany) N Kiefer**	**6**	**7**
4	(The Bahamas) M Knowles (Canada) D Nestor	4	6
8	(United States) D Johnson (United States) F Montana	**6**	3	5
(Croatia) **S Hiršzon** **(Croatia) G Ivanišević**	4	**6**	**7**
(Sweden) J Björkman (Sweden) P Nyborg	4	**7**	5
2	(Australia) **T Woodbridge** **(Australia) M Woodforde**	**6**	6	**7**

Quarterfinals
(Canada) **S Lareau** **(United States) A O'Brien**	**6**	3	**7**
(Germany) T Haas (Germany) N Kiefer	4	**6**	5
(Croatia) **S Hiršzon** **(Croatia) G Ivanišević**	**6**	**6**
2	(Australia) T Woodbridge (Australia) M Woodforde	1	4

Semifinals
(Canada) **S Lareau** **(United States) A O'Brien**	**6**	**6**
(Croatia) S Hiršzon (Croatia) G Ivanišević	2	3
