= 1998 Dubai Tennis Championships – Singles =

Singles
- 1998 Dubai Tennis Championships

Final
- Champion: (Spain) Àlex Corretja
- Runner-up: (Spain) Félix Mantilla
- Score: 7–6^{(7–0)}, 6–1

Details
- Draw: 32
- Seeds: 8

Events
Singles	Doubles
← 1997 ·	Dubai Tennis Championships	· 1999 →

Thomas Muster was the defending champion, but lost in the second round to Nicolas Kiefer.

Àlex Corretja won the title, defeating Félix Mantilla 7–6^{(7–0)}, 6–1 in the final.

== Seeds ==
1. (Sweden) Jonas Björkman (semifinals)
2. (Chile) Marcelo Ríos (first round)
3. (Russia) Yevgeny Kafelnikov (first round)
4. (Spain) Àlex Corretja (champion)
5. (Spain) Sergi Bruguera (first round)
6. (Spain) Félix Mantilla (final)
7. (Austria) Thomas Muster (second round)
8. (Croatia) Goran Ivanišević (first round)

== Draw ==
=== Key ===
- Q = Qualifier
- WC = Wild card
- LL = Lucky loser
- Alt = Alternate
- SE = Special exempt
- PR = Protected ranking
- ITF = ITF entry
- JE = Junior exempt
- w/o = Walkover
- r = Retired
- d = Defaulted
- SR = Special ranking

=== Finals ===
Semifinals
1	(Sweden) Jonas Björkman	3	3
4	(Spain) Àlex Corretja	6	6
6	(Spain) Félix Mantilla	7^{12}	4	6
(South Africa) Wayne Ferreira	6^{10}	6	4

Final
4	(Spain) Àlex Corretja	7^{7}	6
6	(Spain) Félix Mantilla	6^{0}	1

=== Top half ===
First round
1	(Sweden) J Björkman	6	6
Q	(South Africa) D Nainkin	1	3
(Spain) A Portas	2	6	3
(Sweden) M Norman	6	4	6
(Spain) A Costa	6	6
Q	(Spain) Ó Burrieza López	3	4
(Spain) C Moyá	6	6
8	(Croatia) G Ivanišević	3	3
4	(Spain) À Corretja	6	6
(Spain) J Alonso	1	2
SE	(Germany) M Sinner	7	6
Q	(South Africa) P Norval	5	3
(Czech Republic) B Ulihrach	6^{7}	3
WC	(Spain) C Costa	7^{9}	6
(United States) J Tarango	6	6
5	(Spain) S Bruguera	3	3

Second round
1	(Sweden) J Björkman	7^{10}	6
(Sweden) M Norman	6^{8}	2
(Spain) A Costa	6^{3}	2
(Spain) C Moyá	7^{7}	6
4	(Spain) À Corretja	6	6
SE	(Germany) M Sinner	4	3
WC	(Spain) C Costa	1	6	6
(United States) J Tarango	6	2	3

Quarterfinals
1	(Sweden) J Björkman	7^{7}	6
(Spain) C Moyá	6^{3}	1
4	(Spain) À Corretja	7^{7}	5	6
WC	(Spain) C Costa	6^{1}	7	4

Semifinals
1	(Sweden) J Björkman	3	3
4	(Spain) À Corretja	6	6

=== Bottom half ===
First round
6	(Spain) F Mantilla	6	6
(Morocco) K Alami	4	2
(United Kingdom) T Henman	5	0
WC	(Germany) B Becker	7	6
Q	(North Macedonia) A Kitinov	1	3
(Spain) A Berasategui	6	6
(Morocco) H Arazi	6	6
3	(Russia) Y Kafelnikov	2	1
7	(Austria) T Muster	6	6^{4}	6
WC	(Australia) S Stolle	3	7^{7}	4
(Germany) N Kiefer	6	1	6
(Czech Republic) J Novák	1	6	3
(South Africa) W Ferreira	6^{3}	6	7
(Spain) J Sánchez	7^{7}	3	5
(New Zealand) B Steven	6	6
2	(Chile) M Ríos	3	3

Second round
6	(Spain) F Mantilla	w/o
WC	(Germany) B Becker
(Spain) A Berasategui	6	7^{7}
(Morocco) H Arazi	3	6^{3}
7	(Austria) T Muster	6^{5}	4
(Germany) N Kiefer	7^{7}	6
(South Africa) W Ferreira	2	6	6
(New Zealand) B Steven	6	4	3

Quarterfinals
6	(Spain) F Mantilla	6	6
(Spain) A Berasategui	4	4
(Germany) N Kiefer	3	2
(South Africa) W Ferreira	6	6

Semifinals
6	(Spain) F Mantilla	7^{12}	4	6
(South Africa) W Ferreira	6^{10}	6	4
