= 1998 Dutch Open – Singles =

Singles
- 1998 Dutch Open

Final
- Champion: (Sweden) Magnus Norman
- Runner-up: (Spain) Richard Fromberg
- Score: 6–3, 6–3, 2–6, 6–4

Details
- Draw: 32
- Seeds: 8

Events
Singles	Doubles
← 1997 ·	Dutch Open	· 1999 →

Sláva Doseděl was the defending champion, but the eight seeded Czech lost in the quarterfinals to qualifier Mariano Zabaleta. Magnus Norman won in the final 6–3, 6–3, 2–6, 6–4 against number six seed Richard Fromberg and captured the second title of his professional career.

== Seeds ==
Champion seeds are indicated in bold while text in italics indicates the round in which that seed was eliminated.

1. (Slovakia) Karol Kučera (semifinals)
2. (Spain) Felix Mantilla (first round)
3. (Sweden) Magnus Gustafsson (second round)
4. (Sweden) Thomas Johansson (first round)
5. (Italy) Andrea Gaudenzi (first round)
6. (Australia) Richard Fromberg (final)
7. (Slovakia) Dominik Hrbatý (quarterfinals)
8. (Czech Republic) Sláva Doseděl (quarterfinals)

== Draw ==
=== Key ===
- Q = Qualifier
- WC = Wild card
- LL = Lucky loser
- Alt = Alternate
- ITF = ITF entry
- PR = Protected ranking
- SR = Special ranking
- SE = Special exempt
- JE = Junior exempt
- JR = Junior Accelerator Programme entrant
- CO = College Accelerator Programme entrant
- NG = Next Gen Accelerator Program entrant
- w/o = Walkover
- r = Retired
- d = Defaulted

=== Finals ===
Semifinals
1	(Slovakia) Karol Kučera	1	**7^{7}**	2
6	(Australia) **Richard Fromberg**	**6**	6^{4}	**6**
(Sweden) **Magnus Norman**	**7**	**6**
Q	(Argentina) Mariano Zabaleta	5	4

Final
6	(Australia) Richard Fromberg	3	3	**6**	4
(Sweden) **Magnus Norman**	**6**	**6**	2	**6**

=== Section 1 ===
First round
1	**(Slovakia) K Kučera**	**6**	3	**7^{7}**
(Russia) M Safin	2	**6**	6^{5}
Q	**(Denmark) T Larsen**	**6**	**6**
(Romania) D Pescariu	4	4
**(Spain) A Portas**	**6**	3	**6**
(Netherlands) P Haarhuis	4	**6**	4
(Belgium) F Dewulf	3	5
7	**(Slovakia) D Hrbatý**	**6**	**7**
3	**(Sweden) M Gustafsson**	**6**	**6**
(Brazil) F Meligeni	4	3
(Argentina) F Squillari	4	5
Q	**(Romania) A Voinea**	**6**	**7**
(Czech Republic) B Ulihrach	4	**6**	6^{1}
WC	**(Netherlands) D van Scheppingen**	**6**	3	**7^{7}**
(Romania) A Pavel	3	4
6	**(Australia) R Fromberg**	**6**	**6**

Second round
1	**(Slovakia) K Kučera**	**7**	**6**
Q	(Denmark) T Larsen	5	3
(Spain) A Portas	1	2
7	**(Slovakia) D Hrbatý**	**6**	**6**
3	(Sweden) M Gustafsson	**6**	1	3
Q	**(Romania) A Voinea**	4	**6**	**6**
WC	(Netherlands) D van Scheppingen	3	4
6	**(Australia) R Fromberg**	**6**	**6**

Quarterfinals
1	**(Slovakia) K Kučera**	**6**	**6**
7	(Slovakia) D Hrbatý	2	1
Q	(Romania) A Voinea	3	4
6	**(Australia) R Fromberg**	**6**	**6**

Semifinals
1	(Slovakia) K Kučera	1	**7^{7}**	2
6	(Australia) **R Fromberg**	**6**	6^{4}	**6**

=== Section 2 ===
First round
5	(Italy) A Gaudenzi	3	2
**(Czech Republic) J Novák**	**6**	**6**
**(Sweden) M Norman**	6^{9}	5
(Morocco) H Arazi	**7^{11}**	1^{d}
**(Italy) D Sanguinetti**	6^{3}	**6**	**7**
(Spain) Á Calatrava	**7^{7}**	2	5
**(Spain) G Blanco**	0	**6**	**7^{7}**
4	(Sweden) T Johansson	**6**	4	6^{5}
8	**(Czech Republic) S Doseděl**	**7^{7}**	**6**
SE	(Argentina) M Puerta	6^{5}	1
Q	**(Netherlands) M Verkerk**	**7**	**6**
(Netherlands) J van Lottum	5	3
SE	**(Costa Rica) JA Marín**	**6**	4	**6**
(Belgium) J van Herck	2	**6**	3
Q	**(Argentina) M Zabaleta**	**7^{7}**	**6**
2	(Spain) F Mantilla	6^{2}	2

Second round
(Czech Republic) J Novák	1	3
**(Sweden) M Norman**	**6**	**6**
(Italy) D Sanguinetti	**6**	4	1
**(Spain) G Blanco**	2	**6**	**6**
8	**(Czech Republic) S Doseděl**	**6**	**6**
Q	(Netherlands) M Verkerk	4	4
SE	(Costa Rica) JA Marín	1	6^{5}
Q	**(Argentina) M Zabaleta**	**6**	**7^{7}**

Quarterfinals
**(Sweden) M Norman**	**6**	**6**
(Spain) G Blanco	2	4
8	(Czech Republic) S Doseděl	**6**	6^{5}	6^{5}
Q	**(Argentina) M Zabaleta**	2	**7^{7}**	**7^{7}**

Semifinals
(Sweden) **M Norman**	**7**	**6**
Q	(Argentina) M Zabaleta	5	4
