= 1994 Dutch Open – Doubles =

Doubles
- 1994 Dutch Open

Final
- Champions: (Argentina) Daniel Orsanic (Netherlands) Jan Siemerink
- Runners-up: (South Africa) David Adams (Russia) Andrei Olhovskiy
- Score: 6–4, 6–2

Events
Singles	Doubles
← 1993 ·	Dutch Open	· 1995 →

Paul Haarhuis and Jacco Eltingh were the defending champions, but lost in the quarterfinals to Diego Nargiso and Udo Riglewski.

Daniel Orsanic and Jan Siemerink won the title by defeating David Adams and Andrei Olhovskiy 6–4, 6–2 in the final.

== Seeds ==
1. (Netherlands) Jacco Eltingh / (Netherlands) Paul Haarhuis (quarterfinals)
2. (South Africa) David Adams / (Russia) Andrei Olhovskiy (final)
3. (Netherlands) Menno Oosting / (Spain) Javier Sánchez (semifinals)
4. (Netherlands) Hendrik Jan Davids / (South Africa) Piet Norval (first round)

== Draw ==
=== Key ===
- Q = Qualifier
- WC = Wild card
- LL = Lucky loser
- Alt = Alternate
- SE = Special exempt
- PR = Protected ranking
- ITF = ITF entry
- JE = Junior exempt
- w/o = Walkover
- r = Retired
- d = Defaulted
- SR = Special ranking

=== Draw ===
First round
1	(Netherlands) J Eltingh (Netherlands) P Haarhuis	6	6
(Italy) C Brandi (Italy) F Mordegan	2	3
(Italy) D Nargiso (Germany) U Riglewski	6	6
WC	(Spain) J Arrese (Spain) C Costa	2	1
4	(Netherlands) HJ Davids (South Africa) P Norval	4	6	5
WC	(Netherlands) S Noteboom (Netherlands) J Winnink	6	3	7
(Netherlands) T Kempers (Netherlands) T Nijssen	6	6	2
(Argentina) D Orsanic (Netherlands) J Siemerink	3	7	6
(Czech Republic) V Flégl (Australia) A Florent	7	6
(United States) S Cannon (United States) M Keil	6	4
WC	(Australia) R Fromberg (Uruguay) M Filippini	4	4
3	(Netherlands) M Oosting (Spain) J Sánchez	6	6
(Germany) MK Goellner (Czech Republic) K Nováček	4	7	6
(Australia) J Ireland (Belgium) L Pimek	6	6	2
Q	(Spain) E Benfele Álvarez (Spain) P Imaz	2	7	2
2	(South Africa) D Adams (Russia) A Olhovskiy	6	6	6

Quarterfinals
1	(Netherlands) J Eltingh (Netherlands) P Haarhuis	4	4
(Italy) D Nargiso (Germany) U Riglewski	6	6
WC	(Netherlands) S Noteboom (Netherlands) J Winnink	6	6	3
(Argentina) D Orsanic (Netherlands) J Siemerink	7	4	6
(Czech Republic) V Flégl (Australia) A Florent	1	2
3	(Netherlands) M Oosting (Spain) J Sánchez	6	6
(Germany) MK Goellner (Czech Republic) K Nováček	2	3
2	(South Africa) D Adams (Russia) A Olhovskiy	6	6

Semifinals
(Italy) D Nargiso (Germany) U Riglewski	3	6	6
(Argentina) D Orsanic (Netherlands) J Siemerink	6	3	7
3	(Netherlands) M Oosting (Spain) J Sánchez	6	3	3
2	(South Africa) D Adams (Russia) A Olhovskiy	3	6	6

Final
(Argentina) D Orsanic (Netherlands) J Siemerink	6	6
2	(South Africa) D Adams (Russia) A Olhovskiy	4	2
