= 1996 Grolsch Open – Doubles =

Doubles
- 1996 Grolsch Open

Final
- Champions: (United States) Donald Johnson (United States) Francisco Montana
- Runners-up: (Sweden) Rikard Bergh (United States) Jack Waite
- Score: 6–4, 3–6, 6–2

Details
- Draw: 16
- Seeds: 4

Events
Singles	Doubles
← 1995 ·	Grolsch Open	· 1997 →

Marcelo Ríos and Sjeng Schalken were the defending champions but they competed with different partners that year, Ríos with Jordi Burillo and Schalken with John-Laffnie de Jager.

de Jager and Schalken lost in the first round to Brett Hansen-Dent and T.J. Middleton.

Burillo and Ríos lost in the quarterfinals to David Rikl and Pavel Vízner.

Donald Johnson and Francisco Montana won in the final 6–4, 3–6, 6–2 against Rikard Bergh and Jack Waite.

== Seeds ==
Champion seeds are indicated in bold text while text in italics indicates the round in which those seeds were eliminated.

1. (Belgium) Libor Pimek / (South Africa) Byron Talbot (first round)
2. (Czech Republic) David Rikl / (Czech Republic) Pavel Vízner (semifinals)
3. (South Africa) David Adams / (Netherlands) Menno Oosting (first round)
4. (United States) **Donald Johnson** / (United States) **Francisco Montana (champions)**

== Draw ==
=== Key ===
- Q = Qualifier
- WC = Wild card
- LL = Lucky loser
- Alt = Alternate
- SE = Special exempt
- PR = Protected ranking
- ITF = ITF entry
- JE = Junior exempt
- w/o = Walkover
- r = Retired
- d = Defaulted
- SR = Special ranking

First round
1	(Belgium) L Pimek (South Africa) B Talbot	6	**6**	6
(Sweden) **D Ekerot** (Netherlands) **S Noteboom**	**7**	4	**7**
WC	(Spain) A Costa (Spain) C Moyá	3	0
(Sweden) **R Bergh** (United States) **J Waite**	**6**	**6**
3	(South Africa) D Adams (Netherlands) M Oosting	3	2
WC	(Czech Republic) **C Doseděl** (Czech Republic) **B Ulihrach**	**6**	**6**
(South Africa) J-L de Jager (Netherlands) S Schalken	3	2
LL	(United States) **B Hansen-Dent** (United States) **T.J. Middleton**	**6**	**6**
Q	(Argentina) **H Gumy** (Argentina) **D Orsanic**	**6**	3	**6**
(Netherlands) T Kempers (Netherlands) T Nijssen	4	**6**	3
(Spain) J A Conde (Spain) J Sánchez	3	4
4	(United States) **D Johnson** (United States) **F Montana**	**6**	**6**
(United States) S Cannon (United States) G Van Emburgh	4	2
WC	(Spain) **J Burillo** (Chile) **M Ríos**	**6**	**6**
(North Macedonia) A Kitinov (Czech Republic) P Pála	3	2
2	(Czech Republic) **D Rikl** (Czech Republic) **P Vízner**	**6**	**6**

Quarterfinals
(Sweden) D Ekerot (Netherlands) S Noteboom	**6**	1	4
(Sweden) **R Bergh** (United States) **J Waite**	2	**6**	**6**
WC	(Czech Republic) C Doseděl (Czech Republic) B Ulihrach	5	3
LL	(United States) **B Hansen-Dent** (United States) **T.J. Middleton**	**7**	**6**
Q	(Argentina) H Gumy (Argentina) D Orsanic	2	1
4	(United States) **D Johnson** (United States) **F Montana**	**6**	**6**
WC	(Spain) J Burillo (Chile) M Ríos
2	(Czech Republic) **D Rikl** (Czech Republic) **P Vízner**	w/o

Semifinals
(Sweden) **R Bergh** (United States) **J Waite**	**7**	**6**
LL	(United States) B Hansen-Dent (United States) T.J. Middleton	6	2
4	(United States) **D Johnson** (United States) **F Montana**	**6**	**7**
2	(Czech Republic) D Rikl (Czech Republic) P Vízner	4	5

Final
(Sweden) R Bergh (United States) J Waite	4	**6**	2
4	(United States) **D Johnson** (United States) **F Montana**	**6**	3	**6**
