= 1999 Grolsch Open – Doubles =

Doubles
- 1999 Grolsch Open

Final
- Champions: (Netherlands) Paul Haarhuis (Netherlands) Sjeng Schalken
- Runners-up: (United States) Devin Bowen (Israel) Eyal Ran
- Score: 6–3, 6–2

Events
Singles	Doubles
← 1998 ·	Dutch Open	· 2000 →

Jacco Eltingh and Paul Haarhuis were the defending champions, but Eltingh did not compete this year.

Haarhuis teamed up with Sjeng Schalken and successfully defended his title, by defeating Devin Bowen and Eyal Ran 6–3, 6–2 in the final.

== Seeds ==
1. (Argentina) Daniel Orsanic / (Australia) Peter Tramacchi (quarterfinals)
2. (United Kingdom) Neil Broad / (South Africa) Lan Bale (quarterfinals)
3. (South Africa) Chris Haggard / (Sweden) Peter Nyborg (first round)
4. (Italy) Cristian Brandi / (Italy) Massimo Bertolini (quarterfinals)

== Draw ==
=== Key ===
- Q = Qualifier
- WC = Wild card
- LL = Lucky loser
- Alt = Alternate
- SE = Special exempt
- PR = Protected ranking
- ITF = ITF entry
- JE = Junior exempt
- w/o = Walkover
- r = Retired
- d = Defaulted
- SR = Special ranking

=== Draw ===
First round
1	(Argentina) D Orsanic (Australia) P Tramacchi	6	6^{5}	7^{7}
WC	(Netherlands) J van Lottum (Netherlands) P Wessels	3	7^{7}	6^{2}
WC	(Netherlands) P Haarhuis (Netherlands) S Schalken	3	6	6
(Federal Republic of Yugoslavia) N Đorđević (United States) F Montana	6	3	2
3	(South Africa) C Haggard (Sweden) P Nyborg	4	4
Q	(Netherlands) D van Scheppingen (Netherlands) R Sluiter	6	6
(Argentina) M García (Mexico) D Roditi	6	6^{8}	3
(Brazil) F Meligeni (Brazil) J Oncins	4	7^{10}	6
(North Macedonia) A Kitinov (United States) J Waite	6	3	6^{4}
(United States) D Bowen (Israel) E Ran	3	6	7^{7}
(New Zealand) J Greenhalgh (Belgium) T Vanhoudt	3	3
4	(Italy) C Brandi (Italy) M Bertolini	6	6
WC	(Morocco) H Arazi (Slovakia) D Hrbatý	6	2	4
(Argentina) L Arnold Ker (Argentina) M Hood	3	6	6
(Czech Republic) P Pála (Czech Republic) P Vízner	3	3
2	(United Kingdom) N Broad (South Africa) L Bale	6	6

Quarterfinals
1	(Argentina) D Orsanic (Australia) P Tramacchi	7	4	2
WC	(Netherlands) P Haarhuis (Netherlands) S Schalken	5	6	6
Q	(Netherlands) D van Scheppingen (Netherlands) R Sluiter	5	6	5
(Brazil) F Meligeni (Brazil) J Oncins	7	4	7
(United States) D Bowen (Israel) E Ran	7	6
4	(Italy) C Brandi (Italy) M Bertolini	5	3
(Argentina) L Arnold Ker (Argentina) M Hood	7^{7}	6
2	(United Kingdom) N Broad (South Africa) L Bale	6^{5}	0

Semifinals
WC	(Netherlands) P Haarhuis (Netherlands) S Schalken	4	6	6
(Brazil) F Meligeni (Brazil) J Oncins	6	1	3
(United States) D Bowen (Israel) E Ran	6	1	6
(Argentina) L Arnold Ker (Argentina) M Hood	4	6	0

Final
WC	(Netherlands) P Haarhuis (Netherlands) S Schalken	6	6
(United States) D Bowen (Israel) E Ran	3	2
