= 1995 Dutch Open – Doubles =

Doubles
- 1995 Dutch Open

Final
- Champions: (Chile) Marcelo Ríos (Netherlands) Sjeng Schalken
- Runners-up: (Australia) Wayne Arthurs (United Kingdom) Neil Broad
- Score: 7–6, 6–2

Events
Singles	Doubles
← 1994 ·	Dutch Open	· 1996 →

Daniel Orsanic and Jan Siemerink were the defending champions, but Orsanic did not compete this year. Siemerink teamed up with Ellis Ferreira and lost in semifinals to Wayne Arthurs and Neil Broad.

Marcelo Ríos and Sjeng Schalken won the title by defeating Wayne Arthurs and Neil Broad 7–6, 6–2 in the final. It would be the first doubles title for both players and the only doubles title for Ríos in his entire career.

This tournament saw an unusual event, as all seeded pairs were eliminated in first round.

== Seeds ==
1. (Netherlands) Jacco Eltingh / (Netherlands) Paul Haarhuis (first round, withdrew)
2. (n/a)
3. (Spain) Sergio Casal / (Spain) Emilio Sánchez (first round)
4. (Netherlands) Tom Nijssen / (Netherlands) Menno Oosting (first round)

== Draw ==
=== Key ===
- Q = Qualifier
- WC = Wild card
- LL = Lucky loser
- Alt = Alternate
- SE = Special exempt
- PR = Protected ranking
- ITF = ITF entry
- JE = Junior exempt
- w/o = Walkover
- r = Retired
- d = Defaulted
- SR = Special ranking

=== Draw ===
First round
1	(Netherlands) J Eltingh (Netherlands) P Haarhuis
WC	(Chile) M Ríos (Netherlands) S Schalken	w	/	o
(Czech Republic) L Pimek (South Africa) B Talbot	6	7
(Australia) J Ireland (Australia) A Kratzmann	4	6
3	(Spain) S Casal (Spain) E Sánchez	6	7	2
(United States) F Montana (United States) G Van Emburgh	7	6	6
(Italy) C Brandi (Italy) A Gaudenzi	6	4	2
(Netherlands) T Kempers (South Africa) P Norval	1	6	6
(South Africa) E Ferreira (Netherlands) J Siemerink	6	7
WC	(Argentina) P Albano (Peru) J Yzaga	3	5
(United States) M Bauer (Netherlands) S Noteboom	6	7
4	(Netherlands) T Nijssen (Netherlands) M Oosting	2	6
(Australia) W Arthurs (United Kingdom) N Broad	6	3	7
Q	(North Macedonia) A Kitinov (Australia) B Larkham	3	6	5
WC	(Spain) A Berasategui (Spain) À Corretja	2	6	6
LL	(Spain) AJ Viloca (Argentina) M Zabaleta	6	4	1

Quarterfinals
WC	(Chile) M Ríos (Netherlands) S Schalken	2	6	6
(Czech Republic) L Pimek (South Africa) B Talbot	6	2	4
(United States) F Montana (United States) G Van Emburgh	3	2
(Netherlands) T Kempers (South Africa) P Norval	6	6
(South Africa) E Ferreira (Netherlands) J Siemerink	6	7
(United States) M Bauer (Netherlands) S Noteboom	3	6
(Australia) W Arthurs (United Kingdom) N Broad	6	3	7
WC	(Spain) A Berasategui (Spain) À Corretja	3	6	6

Semifinals
WC	(Chile) M Ríos (Netherlands) S Schalken	3	6	6
(Netherlands) T Kempers (South Africa) P Norval	6	3	4
(South Africa) E Ferreira (Netherlands) J Siemerink	4	7	3
(Australia) W Arthurs (United Kingdom) N Broad	6	6	6

Final
WC	(Chile) M Ríos (Netherlands) S Schalken	7	6
(Australia) W Arthurs (United Kingdom) N Broad	6	2
