= 1997 Dutch Open – Singles =

Singles
- 1997 Dutch Open

Final
- Champion: (Czech Republic) Sláva Doseděl
- Runner-up: (Spain) Carlos Moyà
- Score: 7–6^{(7–4)}, 7–6^{(7–5)}, 6–7^{(4–7)}, 6–2

Details
- Draw: 32
- Seeds: 8

Events
Singles	Doubles
← 1996 ·	Dutch Open	· 1998 →

Francisco Clavet was the defending champion, but the eighth seeded Spaniard lost in the quarterfinals to Carlos Moyá. Sláva Doseděl won in the final 7–6^{(7–4)}, 7–6^{(7–5)}, 6–7^{(4–7)}, 6–2 against number one seed Carlos Moyà and captured his third and last title of his professional career.

== Seeds ==
Champion seeds are indicated in bold while text in italics indicates the round in which that seed was eliminated.

1. (Spain) Carlos Moyà (final)
2. (Spain) Albert Costa (first round)
3. (Spain) Alberto Berasategui (first round)
4. (Sweden) Magnus Norman (semifinals)
5. (Czech Republic) Bohdan Ulihrach (first round)
6. (Spain) Javier Sánchez (quarterfinals)
7. (Morocco) Hicham Arazi (second round)
8. (Spain) Francisco Clavet (quarterfinals)

== Draw ==
=== Key ===
- Q = Qualifier
- WC = Wild card
- LL = Lucky loser
- Alt = Alternate
- SE = Special exempt
- PR = Protected ranking
- ITF = ITF entry
- JE = Junior exempt
- w/o = Walkover
- r = Retired
- d = Defaulted
- SR = Special ranking

=== Finals ===
Semifinals
1	(Spain) **Carlos Moyà**	**6**	**6**
4	(Sweden) Magnus Norman	4	3
(Uruguay) Marcelo Filippini	6^{5}	2
(Czech Republic) **Sláva Doseděl**	**7**	**6**

Final
1	(Spain) Carlos Moyà	6^{4}	6^{5}	**7**	2
(Czech Republic) **Sláva Doseděl**	**7**	**7**	6^{4}	**6**

=== Section 1 ===
First round
1	**(Spain) C Moyà**	**6**	**6**
Q	(France) G Carraz	4	4
(Netherlands) P Haarhuis	3	6^{3}
Q	**(Spain) F Vicente**	**6**	**7^{7}**
(Spain) G Blanco	3	**6**	0^{r}
**(Spain) E Benfele Álvarez**	**6**	3	4
Q	(Czech Republic) L Němeček	3	5
8	**(Spain) F Clavet**	**6**	**7**
4	**(Sweden) M Norman**	5	**6**	**6**
(Slovakia) D Hrbatý	**7**	1	0
**(Sweden) M Gustafsson**	**6**	**6**
(Netherlands) S Schalken	3	3
(Italy) R Furlan	4	4
**(Norway) C Ruud**	**6**	**6**
**(Germany) H Dreekmann**	4	**6**	**6**
5	(Czech Republic) B Ulihrach	**6**	4	3

Second round
1	**(Spain) C Moyà**	**6**	**6**
Q	(Spain) F Vicente	4	3
(Spain) E Benfele Álvarez	1	**6**	4
8	**(Spain) F Clavet**	**6**	2	**6**
4	**(Sweden) M Norman**	**6**	**6**
(Sweden) M Gustafsson	4	4
**(Norway) C Ruud**	**7**	**6**
(Germany) H Dreekmann	5	4

Quarterfinals
1	**(Spain) C Moyà**	**6**	**6**
8	(Spain) F Clavet	3	4
4	**(Sweden) M Norman**	**6**	**7^{8}**
(Norway) C Ruud	3	6^{6}

Semifinals
1	(Spain) **C Moyà**	**6**	**6**
4	(Sweden) M Norman	4	3

=== Section 2 ===
First round
6	**(Spain) J Sánchez**	5	**6**	**6**
Q	(Netherlands) T Kempers	**7**	4	4
**(Argentina) H Gumy**	**7**	**6**
SE	(Spain) A Martín	5	3
**(Uruguay) M Filippini**	**7**	1	**6**
(Germany) M-K Goellner	5	**6**	4
**(Morocco) K Alami**	**6**	**6**
3	(Spain) A Berasategui	4	4
7	**(Morocco) H Arazi**	2	**6**	**7^{10}**
(Brazil) F Meligeni	**6**	1	6^{8}
**(Czech Republic) S Doseděl**	**6**	**6**
WC	(Netherlands) F Wibier	3	1
(Belgium) F Dewulf	5	1
WC	**(Netherlands) J van Lottum**	**7**	**6**
WC	**(Netherlands) D van Scheppingen**	**6**	**6**
2	(Spain) A Costa	3	4

Second round
6	**(Spain) J Sánchez**	4	**6**	**7^{7}**
(Argentina) H Gumy	**6**	4	6^{5}
**(Uruguay) M Filippini**	**6**	3	**6**
(Morocco) K Alami	3	**6**	0
7	(Morocco) H Arazi	5	6^{7}
**(Czech Republic) S Doseděl**	**7**	**7^{9}**
WC	**(Netherlands) J van Lottum**	**6**	**7^{7}**
WC	(Netherlands) D van Scheppingen	0	6^{5}

Quarterfinals
6	(Spain) J Sánchez	6^{5}	1
**(Uruguay) M Filippini**	**7^{7}**	**6**
**(Czech Republic) S Doseděl**	**6**	4	**6**
WC	(Netherlands) J van Lottum	4	**6**	2

Semifinals
(Uruguay) M Filippini	6^{5}	2
(Czech Republic) **S Doseděl**	**7**	**6**
