= 1997 Dutch Open – Doubles =

Doubles
- 1997 Dutch Open

Final
- Champions: (Australia) Paul Kilderry (Ecuador) Nicolás Lapentti
- Runners-up: (Australia) Andrew Kratzmann (Belgium) Libor Pimek
- Score: 3–6, 7–5, 7–6

Details
- Draw: 16
- Seeds: 4

Events
| Singles | Doubles |
| ← 1996 · | Dutch Open | · 1998 → |

Donald Johnson and Francisco Montana were the defending champions, but they chose to compete in Montreal at the same week.

Paul Kilderry and Nicolás Lapentti won the title by defeating Andrew Kratzmann and Libor Pimek 3–6, 7–5, 7–6 in the final.

== Seeds ==
1. (Argentina) Pablo Albano / (Argentina) Daniel Orsanic (semifinals)
2. (Netherlands) Tom Kempers / (Netherlands) Menno Oosting (first round)
3. (Australia) Andrew Kratzmann / (Belgium) Libor Pimek (final)
4. (Netherlands) Stephen Noteboom / (Netherlands) Fernon Wibier (first round)

== Draw ==
=== Key ===
- Q = Qualifier
- WC = Wild card
- LL = Lucky loser
- Alt = Alternate
- SE = Special exempt
- PR = Protected ranking
- ITF = ITF entry
- JE = Junior exempt
- w/o = Walkover
- r = Retired
- d = Defaulted
- SR = Special ranking

=== Draw ===
First round
1 | (Argentina) P Albano (Argentina) D Orsanic | 6 | 6
(Spain) A Berasategui (Spain) A Martín | 2 | 3
Q | (Netherlands) R Sluiter (Netherlands) M Verkerk | 6 | 6
WC | (Netherlands) HJ Davids (Netherlands) J van Lottum | 7 | 7
3 | (Australia) A Kratzmann (Belgium) L Pimek | 3 | 6 | 6
(Sweden) D Ekerot (United States) B Hansen-Dent | 6 | 3 | 3
(Morocco) H Arazi (Belgium) T Vanhoudt | 6 | 6
(United States) M Keil (Brazil) F Meligeni | 4 | 2
(South Africa) JL de Jager (United States) S Melville | 3 | 3
(Australia) P Kilderry (Ecuador) N Lapentti | 6 | 6
WC | (Netherlands) E Kempes (Netherlands) P Wessels | 1 | 7 | 6
4 | (Netherlands) S Noteboom (Netherlands) F Wibier | 6 | 6 | 4
(South Africa) B Haygarth (United States) G Van Emburgh | 6 | 2 | 6
WC | (Netherlands) T Nijssen (Netherlands) D van Scheppingen | 4 | 6 | 7
(United States) D Randall (United States) J Waite | 6 | 6
2 | (Netherlands) T Kempers (Netherlands) M Oosting | 4 | 3

Quarterfinals
1 | (Argentina) P Albano (Argentina) D Orsanic | 7 | 6
WC | (Netherlands) HJ Davids (Netherlands) J van Lottum | 6 | 4
3 | (Australia) A Kratzmann (Belgium) L Pimek | 6 | 6 | 6
(Morocco) H Arazi (Belgium) T Vanhoudt | 4 | 7 | 4
(Australia) P Kilderry (Ecuador) N Lapentti | 6 | 6
WC | (Netherlands) E Kempes (Netherlands) P Wessels | 1 | 2
WC | (Netherlands) T Nijssen (Netherlands) D van Scheppingen | 4 | 6 | 3
(United States) D Randall (United States) J Waite | 6 | 1 | 6

Semifinals
1 | (Argentina) P Albano (Argentina) D Orsanic | 6 | 6 | 2
3 | (Australia) A Kratzmann (Belgium) L Pimek | 1 | 7 | 6
(Australia) P Kilderry (Ecuador) N Lapentti | 6 | 6 | 6
(United States) D Randall (United States) J Waite | 7 | 3 | 3

Final
3 | (Australia) A Kratzmann (Belgium) L Pimek | 6 | 5 | 6
(Australia) P Kilderry (Ecuador) N Lapentti | 3 | 7 | 7
