= 1993 Dutch Open – Singles =

Singles
- 1993 Dutch Open

Final
- Champion: (Spain) Carlos Costa
- Runner-up: (Sweden) Magnus Gustafsson
- Score: 6–1, 6–2, 6–3

Details
- Draw: 32
- Seeds: 8

Events
Singles	Doubles
← 1992 ·	Dutch Open	· 1994 →

Karel Nováček was the defending champion, but the second seeded Czech lost in the first round to Andrei Cherkasov. Carlos Costa won in the final 6–1, 6–2, 6–3 against Magnus Gustafsson and captured his third individual title at the ATP Tour.

== Seeds ==
Champion seeds are indicated in bold while text in italics indicates the round in which that seed was eliminated.

1. (Spain) Sergi Bruguera (second round)
2. (Czechoslovakia) Karel Nováček (first round)
3. (Austria) Thomas Muster (quarterfinals)
4. (Spain) Emilio Sánchez (first round)
5. (South Africa) Marcos Ondruska (second round)
6. (Russia) Andrei Chesnokov (second round)
7. (France) Fabrice Santoro (second round)
8. (Germany) Marc-Kevin Goellner (second round)

== Draw ==
=== Key ===
- Q = Qualifier
- WC = Wild card
- LL = Lucky loser
- Alt = Alternate
- SE = Special exempt
- PR = Protected ranking
- ITF = ITF entry
- JE = Junior exempt
- w/o = Walkover
- r = Retired
- d = Defaulted
- SR = Special ranking

=== Finals ===
Semifinals
(Australia) Richard Fromberg	2	**6**	4
(Sweden) **Magnus Gustafsson**	**6**	3	**6**
(Spain) Javier Sánchez	6^{5}	1
(Spain) **Carlos Costa**	**7^{7}**	**6**

Final
(Sweden) Magnus Gustafsson	1	2	3
(Spain) **Carlos Costa**	**6**	**6**	**6**

=== Section 1 ===
First round
1	**(Spain) S Bruguera**	**6**	**6**
Q	(Sweden) J Apell	3	4
Q	(Netherlands) F Wibier	3	2
**(Netherlands) P Haarhuis**	**6**	**6**
**(Australia) R Fromberg**	**7**	**7**
(Germany) B Karbacher	5	5
(Spain) À Corretja	2	4
8	**(Germany) M-K Goellner**	**6**	**6**
4	(Spain) E Sánchez	1	6^{7}
**(Russia) A Olhovskiy**	**6**	**7^{9}**
**(Spain) F Clavet**	6^{7}	**6**	**6**
(Sweden) J Svensson	**7^{9}**	1	4
WC	(Netherlands) T Nijssen	4	5
**(Sweden) M Gustafsson**	**6**	**7**
WC	(Netherlands) M Koevermans	1	0
6	**(Russia) A Chesnokov**	**6**	**6**

Second round
1	(Spain) S Bruguera	6^{5}	3
**(Netherlands) P Haarhuis**	**7^{7}**	**6**
**(Australia) R Fromberg**	6^{3}	**6**	**7^{11}**
8	(Germany) M-K Goellner	**7^{7}**	3	6^{9}
(Russia) A Olhovskiy	4	3
**(Spain) F Clavet**	**6**	**6**
**(Sweden) M Gustafsson**	**6**	4	**6**
6	(Russia) A Chesnokov	2	**6**	2

Quarterfinals
(Netherlands) P Haarhuis	6^{5}	3
**(Australia) R Fromberg**	**7^{7}**	**6**
(Spain) F Clavet	**6**	1	5
**(Sweden) M Gustafsson**	3	**6**	**7**

Semifinals
(Australia) R Fromberg	2	**6**	4
(Sweden) **M Gustafsson**	**6**	3	**6**

=== Section 2 ===
First round
5	**(South Africa) M Ondruska**	**6**	**6**
(Uruguay) M Filippini	1	3
(Spain) J Arrese	**6**	5	6^{8}
**(Spain) J Sánchez**	3	**7**	**7^{10}**
Q	**(France) N Kischkewitz**	3	**6**	4
(Argentina) H de la Peña	**6**	4	1^{r}
(Argentina) F Davín	2	0
3	**(Austria) T Muster**	**6**	**6**
7	**(France) F Santoro**	6^{6}	**6**	**6**
WC	(Argentina) A Mancini	**7^{8}**	3	3
(Brazil) J Oncins	5	**6**	3
**(Spain) C Costa**	**7**	3	**6**
**(Netherlands) J Eltingh**	**6**	**6**
Q	(Belgium) F Dewulf	3	4
**(Russia) A Cherkasov**	**6**	6^{5}	**7^{8}**
2	(Czech Republic) K Nováček	3	**7^{7}**	6^{6}

Second round
5	(South Africa) M Ondruska	**6**	3	3
**(Spain) J Sánchez**	4	**6**	**6**
Q	(France) N Kischkewitz	2	2
3	**(Austria) T Muster**	**6**	**6**
7	(France) F Santoro	2	4
**(Spain) C Costa**	**6**	**6**
(Netherlands) J Eltingh	1	6^{6}
**(Russia) A Cherkasov**	**6**	**7^{8}**

Quarterfinals
**(Spain) J Sánchez**	**6**	5	**6**
3	(Austria) T Muster	4	**7**	3
**(Spain) C Costa**	**6**	**7**
(Russia) A Cherkasov	4	5

Semifinals
(Spain) J Sánchez	6^{5}	1
(Spain) **C Costa**	**7^{7}**	**6**
