= 1994 Dutch Open – Singles =

Singles
- 1994 Dutch Open

Final
- Champion: (Czech Republic) Karel Nováček
- Runner-up: (Australia) Richard Fromberg
- Score: 7–5, 6–4, 7–6^{(9–7)}

Details
- Draw: 32
- Seeds: 8

Events
Singles	Doubles
← 1993 ·	Dutch Open	· 1995 →

Carlos Costa was the defending champion, but the second seeded Spaniard lost in the first round to Marcelo Filippini because he had to retire. Karel Nováček won in the final 7–5, 6–4, 7–6^{(9–7)} against Richard Fromberg and captured his third title in Hilversum.

== Seeds ==
Champion seeds are indicated in bold while text in italics indicates the round in which that seed was eliminated.

1. (Spain) Alberto Berasategui (semifinals)
2. (Spain) Carlos Costa (first round)
3. (Spain) Javier Sánchez (second round)
4. (Netherlands) Paul Haarhuis (second round)
5. (Czech Republic) Sláva Doseděl (quarterfinals)
6. (Russia) Andrei Chesnokov (second round)
7. (Austria) Gilbert Schaller (quarterfinals)
8. (Italy) Renzo Furlan (quarterfinals)

== Draw ==
=== Key ===
- Q = Qualifier
- WC = Wild card
- LL = Lucky loser
- Alt = Alternate
- ITF = ITF entry
- PR = Protected ranking
- SR = Special ranking
- SE = Special exempt
- JE = Junior exempt
- JR = Junior Accelerator Programme entrant
- CO = College Accelerator Programme entrant
- NG = Next Gen Accelerator Program entrant
- w/o = Walkover
- r = Retired
- d = Defaulted

=== Finals ===
Semifinals
1	(Spain) Alberto Berasategui	6^{2}	**6**	0
(Australia) **Richard Fromberg**	**7^{7}**	3	**6**
WC	(Chile) Marcelo Ríos	**6**	3	4
(Czech Republic) **Karel Nováček**	3	**6**	**6**

Final
(Australia) Richard Fromberg	5	4	6^{7}
(Czech Republic) **Karel Nováček**	**7**	**6**	**7^{9}**

=== Section 1 ===
First round
1	**(Spain) A Berasategui**	**6**	**6**
(Spain) J Arrese	4	2
(Argentina) F Davín	**6**	3	2
**(Russia) A Olhovskiy**	2	**6**	**6**
Q	**(Germany) T Gollwitzer**	4	**6**	**6**
(Italy) D Nargiso	**6**	3	3
Q	(Netherlands) S Schalken	**6**	5	3
8	**(Italy) R Furlan**	4	**7**	**6**
4	**(Netherlands) P Haarhuis**	**7**	**7**
(Netherlands) J Eltingh	5	5
(Netherlands) J Siemerink	5	5
**(Australia) R Fromberg**	**7**	**7**
Q	(France) S Matheu	4	2
**(Spain) T Carbonell**	**6**	**6**
(Russia) A Cherkasov	2	3
5	**(Czech Republic) S Doseděl**	**6**	**6**

Second round
1	**(Spain) A Berasategui**	4	**6**	**6**
(Russia) A Olhovskiy	**6**	3	4
Q	(Germany) T Gollwitzer	2	6^{4}
8	**(Italy) R Furlan**	**6**	**7^{7}**
4	(Netherlands) P Haarhuis	4	4
**(Australia) R Fromberg**	**6**	**6**
(Spain) T Carbonell	**6**	5	6^{3}
5	**(Czech Republic) S Doseděl**	3	**7**	**7^{7}**

Quarterfinals
1	**(Spain) A Berasategui**	**6**	2	**6**
8	(Italy) R Furlan	3	**6**	4
**(Australia) R Fromberg**	2	**7^{7}**	**6**
5	(Czech Republic) S Doseděl	**6**	6^{4}	1

Semifinals
1	(Spain) A Berasategui	6^{2}	**6**	0
(Australia) **R Fromberg**	**7^{7}**	3	**6**

=== Section 2 ===
First round
6	(Russia) A Chesnokov	**6**	3	6^{3}
**(France) G Forget**	2	**6**	**7^{7}**
(Spain) À Corretja	4	4
Q	**(Netherlands) J Winnink**	**6**	**6**
WC	(Netherlands) HJ Davids	2	3
WC	**(Chile) M Ríos**	**6**	**6**
LL	(Germany) L Rehmann	4	4
3	**(Spain) J Sánchez**	**6**	**6**
7	**(Austria) G Schaller**	4	**6**	**6**
(Germany) M-K Goellner	**6**	4	4
**(Brazil) F Meligeni**	**6**	**6**
(Germany) B Karbacher	2	2
**(Czech Republic) K Nováček**	3	**7^{7}**	**6**
WC	(Netherlands) T Nijssen	**6**	6^{2}	2
**(Uruguay) M Filippini**	**7^{7}**	3
2	(Spain) C Costa	6^{5}	1^{r}

Second round
**(France) G Forget**	**6**	**6**
Q	(Netherlands) J Winnink	4	4
WC	**(Chile) M Ríos**	**6**	0	**6**
3	(Spain) J Sánchez	4	**6**	1
7	**(Austria) G Schaller**	**7**	**7**
(Brazil) F Meligeni	5	5
**(Czech Republic) K Nováček**	**6**	3	**6**
(Uruguay) M Filippini	3	**6**	3

Quarterfinals
(France) G Forget	3	3
WC	**(Chile) M Ríos**	**6**	**6**
7	(Austria) G Schaller	1	5
**(Czech Republic) K Nováček**	**6**	**7**

Semifinals
WC	(Chile) M Ríos	**6**	3	4
(Czech Republic) **K Nováček**	3	**6**	**6**
