= Olivier Morel (tennis) =

French tennis player

- Country (sports): France
- Born: 3 August 1972 (age 54)

Singles
- Highest ranking: No. 496 (19 May 1997)

Doubles
- Career record: 0–2
- Highest ranking: No. 203 (27 Oct 1997)

Grand Slam doubles results
- French Open: 1R (1997)

Olivier Morel (born 3 August 1972) is a French former professional tennis player.

Morel was a wildcard pairing, with Guillaume Marx, in the 1997 French Open men's doubles main draw. The pair were beaten in the first round by seventh seeds Rick Leach and Jonathan Stark.

In 2002 he made his ATP Tour main draw debut in doubles at the TD Waterhouse Cup on Long Island.

Morel, now a New York-based tennis coach, has previously served as a tour coach of players including Mischa Zverev and Sergei Bubka. He is a former hitting partner of Ana Ivanovic.

== ATP Challenger/ITF Futures finals ==
=== Doubles: 5 (2–3) ===
Legend
ATP Challenger (0–1)
ITF Futures (2–2)

Result	W–L	Date	Tournament	Tier	Surface	Partner	Opponents	Score
Loss	0–1	Aug 1997	Geneva Challenger, Geneva	Challenger	Clay	(France) Guillaume Marx	(Argentina) Mariano Puerta (Argentina) Diego del Río	3–6, 4–6
Win	1–0	Mar 1998	Germany F2, Offenbach	Futures	Hard	(France) Stéphane Matheu	(Finland) Tommi Lenho (Brazil) Alexandre Simoni	7–5, 2–6, 6–3
Loss	1–1	Jul 1998	France F2, Aix-en-Provence	Futures	Clay	(France) Stéphane Matheu	(United States) Hugo Armando (Argentina) Pablo Bianchi	4–6, 5–7
Loss	1–2	Oct 1998	France F11, La Roche-sur-Yon	Futures	Hard	(France) Stéphane Matheu	(France) Régis Lavergne (France) Guillaume Marx	2–6, 1–6
Win	2–2	Oct 1998	France F12, Rodez	Futures	Hard	(France) Stéphane Matheu	(France) Julien Cuaz (Belgium) Wim Neefs	5–7, 7–6, 7–5
