= 1994 Dutch Open (tennis) =

- Date: 25 July – 1 August
- Edition: 37th
- Category: World Series
- Draw: 32S / 16D
- Prize money: $275,000
- Surface: Clay / outdoor
- Location: Hilversum, Netherlands

Champions

Singles
- (Czech Republic) Karel Nováček

Doubles
- (Argentina) Daniel Orsanic / (Netherlands) Jan Siemerink
- Dutch Open

The 1994 Dutch Open was an ATP tennis tournament held in Hilversum, Netherlands and played on outdoor clay courts. It was the 37th edition of the tournament and was held from 25 July to 1 August 1994. Unseeded Karel Nováček won his first title of the year, and 13th of his career. It was his 3rd win at Hilversum, having also won in 1989 and 1992.

== Finals ==
=== Singles ===
(Czech Republic) Karel Nováček defeated (Australia) Richard Fromberg, 7–5, 6–4, 7–6^{(9–7)}

- It was Nováček's only singles title of the year and the 13th and last of his career.

=== Doubles ===
(Argentina) Daniel Orsanic / (Netherlands) Jan Siemerink defeated (South Africa) David Adams / (Russia) Andrei Olhovskiy 6–4, 6–2
