= 1999 ATP German Open =

- Date: 3–10 May
- Edition: 93rd
- Category: ATP Super 9
- Draw: 56S / 28D
- Prize money: $2,200,000
- Surface: Clay / outdoor
- Location: Hamburg, Germany
- Venue: Rothenbaum Tennis Center

Champions

Singles
- (Chile) Marcelo Ríos

Doubles
- (Australia) Wayne Arthurs / (Australia) Andrew Kratzmann
← 1998 ·	ATP German Open	· 2000 →

The 1999 German Open was a men's tennis tournament played on outdoor clay courts. It was the 93rd edition of the Hamburg Masters (German Open), and was part of the ATP Super 9 of the 1999 ATP Tour. It took place at the Rothenbaum Tennis Center in Hamburg, Germany, from through 3 May through 10 May 1999.

== Finals ==
=== Singles ===
(Chile) Marcelo Ríos defeated (Argentina) Mariano Zabaleta 6–7^{(5–7)}, 7–5, 5–7, 7–6^{(7–5)}, 6–2

- It was Marcelo Ríos' 1st title of the year, and his 13th overall. It was his 1st Masters title of the year, and his 5th overall.

=== Doubles ===
(Australia) Wayne Arthurs / (Australia) Andrew Kratzmann defeated (Netherlands) Paul Haarhuis / (United States) Jared Palmer 4–6, 7–6^{(7–5)}, 6–4
