= 1999 Grolsch Open =

- Date: 2–8 August
- Edition: 42nd
- Category: World Series
- Draw: 32S / 16D
- Prize money: $475,000
- Surface: Clay / outdoor
- Location: Amsterdam, Netherlands

Champions

Singles
- (Morocco) Younes El Aynaoui

Doubles
- (Netherlands) Sjeng Schalken / (Netherlands) Paul Haarhuis
- Dutch Open

The 1999 Grolsch Open, also known as the Dutch Open, was an ATP men's tennis tournament played on outdoor clay courts in Amsterdam, Netherlands that was part of the World Series of the 1999 ATP Tour. It was the 42nd edition of the tournament and was held from 2 to 8 August. Sixth-seeded Younes El Aynaoui won the singles title.

== Finals ==
=== Singles ===
(Morocco) Younes El Aynaoui defeated (Argentina) Mariano Zabaleta 6–0, 6–3

- It was El Aynaoui's first singles title of his career.

=== Doubles ===
(Netherlands) Sjeng Schalken / (Netherlands) Paul Haarhuis defeated (United States) Devin Bowen / (Israel) Eyal Ran 6–3, 6–2
