= 1999 Grolsch Open – Singles =

Singles
- 1999 Grolsch Open

Final
- Champion: (Morocco) Younes El Aynaoui
- Runner-up: (Argentina) Mariano Zabaleta
- Score: 6–0, 6–3

Details
- Draw: 32
- Seeds: 8

Events
Singles	Doubles
← 1998 ·	Dutch Open	· 2000 →

Magnus Norman was the defending champion, but the fifth seeded Swede lost in the first round to qualifier Adrian Voinea. Younes El Aynaoui won in the final 6–0, 6–3 against number three seed Mariano Zabaleta and captured the second title of his professional career.

== Seeds ==
Champion seeds are indicated in bold while text in italics indicates the round in which that seed was eliminated.

1. (Slovakia) Dominik Hrbatý (first round)
2. (Ecuador) Nicolás Lapentti (semifinals)
3. (Argentina) Mariano Zabaleta (final)
4. (Brazil) Fernando Meligeni (quarterfinals)
5. (Sweden) Magnus Norman (first round)
6. (Morocco) **Younes El Aynaoui (champion)**
7. (Ukraine) Andriy Medvedev (second round)
8. (Russia) Marat Safin (semifinals)

== Draw ==
=== Key ===
- Q = Qualifier
- WC = Wild card
- LL = Lucky loser
- Alt = Alternate
- SE = Special exempt
- PR = Protected ranking
- ITF = ITF entry
- JE = Junior exempt
- w/o = Walkover
- r = Retired
- d = Defaulted
- SR = Special ranking

=== Finals ===
Semifinals
8	(Russia) Marat Safin	1	4
6	(Morocco) **Younes El Aynaoui**	**6**	**6**
3	(Argentina) **Mariano Zabaleta**	3	**7**	**7**
2	(Ecuador) Nicolás Lapentti	**6**	5	5

Final
6	(Morocco) **Younes El Aynaoui**	**6**	**6**
3	(Argentina) Mariano Zabaleta	0	3

=== Section 1 ===
First round
1	(Slovakia) D Hrbatý	2	3
**(France) A Di Pasquale**	**6**	**6**
Q	(Sweden) A Vinceguerra	1	6^{5}
**(Romania) A Pavel**	**6**	**7^{7}**
**(Argentina) G Gaudio**	4	**6**	**6**
(Armenia) S Sargsian	**6**	2	2
(Netherlands) J van Lottum	**6**	3	5
8	**(Russia) M Safin**	2	**6**	**7**
4	**(Brazil) F Meligeni**	**6**	**7^{7}**
WC	(Spain) A Berasategui	3	6^{1}
(Spain) F Vicente	6^{2}	4
SE	**(Spain) A Portas**	**7^{7}**	**6**
SE	(United States) J Tarango	4	6^{3}
**(Morocco) K Alami**	**6**	**7^{7}**
(Austria) S Koubek	6^{6}	3
6	**(Morocco) Y El Aynaoui**	**7^{8}**	**6**

Second round
**(France) A Di Pasquale**	**7^{7}**	**6**
(Romania) A Pavel	6^{5}	2
(Argentina) G Gaudio	4	6^{4}
8	**(Russia) M Safin**	**6**	**7^{7}**
4	**(Brazil) F Meligeni**	**6**	**7^{7}**
SE	(Spain) A Portas	3	6^{3}
(Morocco) K Alami	**6**	1	1
6	**(Morocco) Y El Aynaoui**	1	**6**	**6**

Quarterfinals
(France) A Di Pasquale	6^{7}	**6**	4
8	**(Russia) M Safin**	**7^{9}**	0	**6**
4	(Brazil) F Meligeni	2	4
6	**(Morocco) Y El Aynaoui**	**6**	**6**

Semifinals
8	(Russia) M Safin	1	4
6	(Morocco) **Y El Aynaoui**	**6**	**6**

=== Section 2 ===
First round
5	(Sweden) M Norman	**6**	6^{4}	6^{6}
**(Romania) A Voinea**	4	**7^{7}**	**7^{8}**
**(Sweden) M Gustafsson**	2	**7**	**6**
(Czech Republic) B Ulihrach	**6**	5	1
(Argentina) M Puerta	5	1
**(Argentina) F Squillari**	**7**	**6**
Q	(Netherlands) R Sluiter	3	**6**	6^{1}
3	**(Argentina) M Zabaleta**	**6**	4	**7^{7}**
7	**(Ukraine) A Medvedev**	**7**	**6**
WC	(Netherlands) P Haarhuis	5	3
(Netherlands) S Schalken	2	**6**	4
**(Morocco) H Arazi**	**6**	0	**6**
**(Norway) C Ruud**	**6**	5	**7**
WC	(Netherlands) P Wessels	3	**7**	5
Q	(Argentina) M Rodríguez	3	2
2	**(Ecuador) N Lapentti**	**6**	**6**

Second round
(Romania) A Voinea	**6**	3	1
**(Sweden) M Gustafsson**	3	**6**	**6**
(Argentina) F Squillari	5	4
3	**(Argentina) M Zabaleta**	**7**	**6**
7	(Ukraine) A Medvedev	2	3
**(Morocco) H Arazi**	**6**	**6**
(Norway) C Ruud	5	3
2	**(Ecuador) N Lapentti**	**7**	**6**

Quarterfinals
(Sweden) M Gustafsson	6^{3}	3
3	**(Argentina) M Zabaleta**	**7^{7}**	**6**
(Morocco) H Arazi	**6**	5	3
2	**(Ecuador) N Lapentti**	2	**7**	**6**

Semifinals
3	(Argentina) **M Zabaleta**	3	**7**	**7**
2	(Ecuador) N Lapentti	**6**	5	5
