= Michael Geserer =

German tennis player

- Full name: Michael Geserer
- Country (sports): Germany
- Born: 14 December 1969 (age 55); Regensburg, West Germany
- Height: 6 ft 3 in (191 cm)
- Plays: Right-handed
- Prize money: $99,790

Singles
- Career record: 2–7
- Highest ranking: No. 189 (17 June 1996)

Doubles
- Career record: 0–2
- Highest ranking: No. 242 (23 November 1992)

Michael Geserer (born 14 December 1969) is a tennis coach and former professional player from Germany.

== Biography ==
Born in Regensburg, Geserer only started playing tennis at the age of 17; as a child, he played soccer and ran 800 and 1000 meter races in track and field. After graduating from high school in 1989, he completed a year of military service before committing to professional tennis in 1991.

Geserer achieved a career-high singles ranking of No. 189 and featured in the qualifying draws of all four Grand Slam tournaments. His best performances on the ATP Tour were appearances in the round of 16 at the 1995 Arizona Tennis Championships and the 1995 Dutch Open, having reached both main draws as a qualifier before losing to Stefan Edberg and Karel Nováček, respectively.

Geserer has been the coach and manager of Jule Niemeier since December 2023. He formerly coached Julia Görges, Jennifer Brady, and Petra Martić.

== Challenger titles ==
=== Doubles: (1) ===
No.	Year	Tournament	Surface	Partner	Opponents	Score
1.	1992	Cali, Colombia	Hard	(Brazil) Fabio Silberberg	(Argentina) Daniel Orsanic (Cuba) Mario Tabares	6–4, 6–4
