= Thomas Larsen (tennis) =

Danish tennis player

- Full name: Thomas Larsen
- Country (sports): Denmark
- Born: 15 July 1975 (age 49); Aarhus, Denmark
- Height: 1.80 m (5 ft 11 in)
- Plays: Right-handed
- Prize money: $52,164

Singles
- Career record: 2–8
- Career titles: 0
- Highest ranking: No. 170 (21 September 1998)

Doubles
- Highest ranking: No. 547 (12 August 1996)

Thomas Larsen (born 15 July 1975) is a retired professional Danish tennis player.

== Biography ==
Larsen, who was born in Aarhus, turned professional in 1995.

A right-handed player, he made his Davis Cup debut in a 1996 World Group qualifier against Spain, where he was beaten by Carlos Moya.

In 1997 he appeared in the main draw of an ATP Tour tournament for the first time, as a wildcard at his home event, the Copenhagen Open.

Larsen had his best year on tour in 1998. Playing as a qualifier, he featured in the main draw of the 1998 Dutch Open and had a win over Dinu Pescariu, then fell in the second round to top seed Karol Kucera. Later in 1998 he finished runner-up in two Challenger tournaments in the space of a month, at Sopot and Brasov, after which his ranking rose to a career best 170 in the world. He took Stefan Koubek of Austria to five sets in a Davis Cup tie against Austria in Pörtschach.

He received another wildcard into the Copenhagen Open in 1999 and won his only Davis Cup match that year, over Hungary's Zoltán Böröczky.

In 2001 he made his final Davis Cup appearance for Denmark.

== See also ==
- List of Denmark Davis Cup team representatives
