= 1995 Dutch Open (tennis) =

- Date: 24–30 July
- Edition: 38th
- Category: World Series
- Draw: 32S / 16D
- Prize money: $475,000
- Surface: Clay / outdoor
- Location: Amsterdam, Netherlands

Champions

Singles
- (Chile) Marcelo Ríos

Doubles
- (Chile) Marcelo Ríos / (Netherlands) Sjeng Schalken
- Dutch Open

The 1995 Dutch Open was an ATP men's tennis tournament held in Amsterdam, Netherlands, after being transferred from Hilversum, and played on outdoor clay courts. It was the 38th edition of the tournament that was part of the World Series of the 1995 ATP Tour and was held from 24 July until 30 July 1995. Unseeded qualifier Marcelo Ríos won his second title of the year, and the second as well of his career.

== Finals ==
=== Singles ===
(Chile) Marcelo Ríos defeated (Netherlands) Jan Siemerink 6–4, 7–5, 6–4

- It was Ríos' 2nd singles title of the year and of his career.

=== Doubles ===
(Chile) Marcelo Ríos / (Netherlands) Sjeng Schalken defeated (Australia) Wayne Arthurs / (United Kingdom) Neil Broad 7–6, 6–2
