= 1998 ATP German Open – Doubles =

Doubles
- 1998 ATP German Open

Final
- Champions: (United States) Donald Johnson (United States) Francisco Montana
- Runners-up: (South Africa) David Adams (New Zealand) Brett Steven
- Score: 6–4, 6–4

Events
Singles	Doubles
← 1997 ·	ATP German Open	· 1999 →

Luis Lobo and Javier Sánchez were the defending champions, but lost in the second round to Tomás Carbonell and Francisco Roig.

Donald Johnson and Francisco Montana won the title, defeating David Adams and Brett Steven, 6–2, 7–5.

== Seeds ==
Champion seeds are indicated in bold text while text in italics indicates the round in which those seeds were eliminated. The top four seeds received a bye to the second round.

1. (South Africa) Ellis Ferreira / (United States) Rick Leach (semifinals)
2. (United States) Jim Grabb / (Czech Republic) Cyril Suk (second round)
3. (Argentina) Luis Lobo / (Spain) Javier Sánchez (second round)
4. (United States) **Donald Johnson** / (United States) **Francisco Montana (champions)**
5. (United Kingdom) Neil Broad / (South Africa) Piet Norval (quarterfinals)
6. (India) Mahesh Bhupathi / (The Bahamas) Mark Knowles (quarterfinals)
7. (Australia) Joshua Eagle / (Australia) Andrew Florent (quarterfinals)
8. (United States) Trevor Kronemann / (Australia) David Macpherson (first round)

== Draw ==
=== Key ===
- Q = Qualifier
- WC = Wild card
- LL = Lucky loser
- Alt = Alternate
- ITF = ITF entry
- PR = Protected ranking
- SR = Special ranking
- SE = Special exempt
- JE = Junior exempt
- JR = Junior Accelerator Programme entrant
- CO = College Accelerator Programme entrant
- NG = Next Gen Accelerator Program entrant
- w/o = Walkover
- r = Retired
- d = Defaulted

=== Finals ===
Semifinals
1	(South Africa) Ellis Ferreira (United States) Rick Leach	4	**6**	4
4	(United States) **Donald Johnson** **(United States) Francisco Montana**	**6**	3	**6**
(Spain) Tomás Carbonell (Spain) Francisco Roig	6	4
(South Africa) **D Adams** **(New Zealand) Brett Steven**	**7**	**6**

Final
4	(United States) **Donald Johnson** **(United States) Francisco Montana**	**6**	**7**
(South Africa) D Adams (New Zealand) Brett Steven	2	5

=== Top half ===
First round
(Australia) **A Kratzmann** **(Mexico) D Roditi**	**6**	6	**7**
(Russia) A Olhovskiy (Czech Republic) P Vízner	4	**7**	6
(United Kingdom) **T Henman** **(Chile) M Ríos**	**6**	**6**
(Netherlands) T Kempers (Netherlands) M Oosting	2	3
7	(Australia) **J Eagle** **(Australia) A Florent**	**6**	3	**6**
(South Africa) W Ferreira (Russia) Y Kafelnikov	4	**6**	3
(South Africa) **J-L de Jager** **(South Africa) R Koenig**	**7**	**7**
(Germany) D Dier (Germany) M Kohlmann	6	6
(Germany) **J Knippschild** **(Germany) R Schüttler**	3	**6**	**6**
(North Macedonia) A Kitinov (Sweden) P Nyborg	**6**	4	4
5	(United Kingdom) **N Broad** **(South Africa) P Norval**	4	**6**	**7**
(Brazil) G Kuerten (Brazil) F Meligeni	**6**	3	5

Second round
(Australia) A Kratzmann (Mexico) D Roditi	3	2
1	(South Africa) **E Ferreira** **(United States) R Leach**	**6**	**6**
(United Kingdom) T Henman (Chile) M Ríos	4	4
7	(Australia) **J Eagle** **(Australia) A Florent**	**6**	**6**
4	(United States) **D Johnson** **(United States) F Montana**	**6**	**6**
(South Africa) J-L de Jager (South Africa) R Koenig	3	2
(Germany) J Knippschild (Germany) R Schüttler	2	5
5	(United Kingdom) **N Broad** **(South Africa) P Norval**	**6**	**7**

Quarterfinals
1	(South Africa) **E Ferreira** **(United States) R Leach**	**6**	**6**
7	(Australia) J Eagle (Australia) A Florent	3	2
4	(United States) **D Johnson** **(United States) F Montana**	**6**	**6**
5	(United Kingdom) Neil Broad (South Africa) Piet Norval	4	4

Semifinals
1	(South Africa) E Ferreira (United States) R Leach	4	**6**	4
4	(United States) **D Johnson** **(United States) F Montana**	**6**	3	**6**

=== Bottom half ===
First round
6	(India) **M Bhupathi** **(The Bahamas) M Knowles**	**6**	**6**
(Australia) R Fromberg (Italy) F Maggi	4	3
(Spain) **A Berasategui** **(Netherlands) F Wibier**	**6**	**6**
(Germany) T Haas (Germany) N Kiefer	1	3
(Spain) **T Carbonell** **(Spain) F Roig**	4	**6**	**6**
(Spain) J Alonso (Ecuador) N Lapentti	**6**	4	0
(Argentina) **P Albano** **(France) F Santoro**	**6**	**6**
8	(United States) T Kronemann (Australia) D Macpherson	0	4
(South Africa) **D Adams** **(New Zealand) B Steven**	**7**	**6**
(Germany) B Becker (Croatia) G Ivanišević	6	3
(Argentina) **L Arnold** **(Argentina) D Orsanic**	**6**	**7**
(Germany) M-K Goellner (Germany) D Prinosil	2	6

Second round
6	(India) **M Bhupathi** **(The Bahamas) M Knowles**	w/o
(Spain) A Berasategui (Netherlands) F Wibier
(Spain) **T Carbonell** **(Spain) F Roig**	**6**	**6**
3	(Argentina) L Lobo (Spain) J Sánchez	2	4
(Argentina) P Albano (France) F Santoro	**6**	5	5
(South Africa) **D Adams** **(New Zealand) B Steven**	3	**7**	**7**
(Argentina) **L Arnold** **(Argentina) D Orsanic**	**6**	**7**
2	(United States) J Grabb (Czech Republic) C Suk	2	6

Quarterfinals
6	(India) M Bhupathi (The Bahamas) M Knowles	4	4
(Spain) **T Carbonell** **(Spain) F Roig**	**6**	**6**
(South Africa) **D Adams** **(New Zealand) B Steven**	**6**	6	**6**
(Argentina) L Arnold (Argentina) D Orsanic	4	**7**	4

Semifinals
(Spain) T Carbonell (Spain) F Roig	6	4
(South Africa) **D Adams** **(New Zealand) B Steven**	**7**	**6**
