= Stéphane Matheu =

French tennis player

- Country (sports): France
- Born: 27 April 1973 (age 51)
- Plays: Left-handed
- Prize money: $17,401

Singles
- Career record: 0–1
- Highest ranking: No. 286 (15 May 1995)

Grand Slam singles results
- Australian Open: Q2 (1995)
- French Open: Q2 (1995)
- US Open: Q2 (1994)

Doubles
- Highest ranking: No. 375 (10 May 1999)

Stéphane Matheu (born 27 April 1973) is a French former professional tennis player.

A left-handed player, Matheu was active on the professional tour in the 1990s and reached a career best singles world ranking of 286. He made his only ATP Tour main draw appearances as a qualifier at the 1994 Dutch Open.

Matheu is now involved in professional poker as a team manager.

== ITF Futures titles ==
Titles by surface
Hard (2)
Clay (1)

=== Doubles: (3) ===
No.	Date	Tournament	Surface	Partner	Opponents	Score
1.	Mar 1998	Germany F2, Offenbach	Hard	(France) Olivier Morel	(Finland) Tommi Lenho (Brazil) Alexandre Simoni	7–5, 2–6, 6–3
2.	Oct 1998	France F12, Rodez	Hard	(France) Olivier Morel	(France) Julien Cuaz (Belgium) Wim Neefs	5–7, 7–6, 7–5
3.	Jun 1999	Finland F3, Vierumäki	Clay	(Belgium) Olivier Rochus	(Finland) Lassi Ketola (Finland) Janne Ojala	6–3, 4–6, 6–1
