= 1993 Dutch Open (tennis) =

- Date: 26 July – 1 August
- Edition: 36th
- Category: World Series
- Draw: 32S / 16D
- Prize money: $265,000
- Surface: Clay / outdoor
- Location: Hilversum, Netherlands
- Venue: 't Melkhuisje

Champions

Singles
- (Spain) Carlos Costa

Doubles
- (Netherlands) Paul Haarhuis / (Netherlands) Jacco Eltingh
- Dutch Open

The 1993 Dutch Open was an ATP men's tennis tournament played on outdoor clay courts in Hilversum, Netherlands that was part of the World Series category of the 1993 ATP Tour. It was the 36th edition of the tournament and was held from 26 July until 1 August 1993. Unseeded Carlos Costa won the singles title.

== Finals ==
=== Singles ===
(Spain) Carlos Costa defeated (Sweden) Magnus Gustafsson, 6–1, 6–2, 6–3

- It was Costa's 1st singles title of the year and the 3rd of his career.

=== Doubles ===
(Netherlands) Jacco Eltingh / (Netherlands) Paul Haarhuis defeated (Netherlands) Hendrik Jan Davids / (Belgium) Libor Pimek 4–6, 6–2, 7–5
