= 1995 Dutch Open – Singles =

Singles
- 1995 Dutch Open

Final
- Champion: (Chile) Marcelo Ríos
- Runner-up: (Netherlands) Jan Siemerink
- Score: 6–4, 7–5, 6–4

Details
- Draw: 32
- Seeds: 8

Events
Singles	Doubles
← 1994 ·	Dutch Open	· 1996 →

Karel Nováček was the defending champion, but the seventh seeded Czech lost in the quarterfinals to Gilbert Schaller. Qualifier Marcelo Ríos won in the final 6–4, 7–5, 6–4 against Jan Siemerink and captured his second title of the year.

== Seeds ==
Champion seeds are indicated in bold while text in italics indicates the round in which that seed was eliminated.

1. (Austria) Thomas Muster (second round, withdrew)
2. (Spain) Alberto Berasategui (second round)
3. (Italy) Andrea Gaudenzi (first round)
4. (Netherlands) Jacco Eltingh (first round)
5. (Spain) Àlex Corretja (second round)
6. (Netherlands) Paul Haarhuis (first round)
7. (Czech Republic) Karel Nováček (quarterfinals)
8. (Spain) Francisco Clavet (first round)

== Draw ==
=== Key ===
- Q = Qualifier
- WC = Wild card
- LL = Lucky loser
- Alt = Alternate
- SE = Special exempt
- PR = Protected ranking
- ITF = ITF entry
- JE = Junior exempt
- w/o = Walkover
- r = Retired
- d = Defaulted
- SR = Special ranking

=== Finals ===
Semifinals
(Spain) Carlos Costa	6^{1}	0
Q	(Chile) **Marcelo Ríos**	**7^{7}**	**6**
(Netherlands) **Jan Siemerink**	**7^{8}**	6^{4}	**6**
(Austria) Gilbert Schaller	6^{6}	**7^{7}**	4

Final
Q	(Chile) **Marcelo Ríos**	**6**	**7**	**6**
(Netherlands) Jan Siemerink	4	5	4

=== Section 1 ===
First round
1	**(Austria) T Muster**	**6**	**6**
(Germany) M Sinner	2	3
WC	(Netherlands) S Schalken	3	4
**(Uruguay) M Filippini**	**6**	**6**
**(Spain) C Costa**	**6**	6^{3}	**7**
(Peru) J Yzaga	3	**7^{7}**	5
**(Brazil) F Meligeni**	3	**6**	**6**
8	(Spain) F Clavet	**6**	4	3
4	(Netherlands) J Eltingh	4	4
**(Germany) B Karbacher**	**6**	**6**
**(Czech Republic) S Doseděl**	**6**	**6**
WC	(Netherlands) J Winnink	1	2
(Italy) R Furlan	3	6^{2}
Q	**(Chile) M Ríos**	**6**	**7^{7}**
(Slovakia) K Kučera	1	4
5	**(Spain) À Corretja**	**6**	**6**

Second round
1	(Austria) T Muster
**(Uruguay) M Filippini**	w/o
**(Spain) C Costa**	4	**6**	**6**
(Brazil) F Meligeni	**6**	3	0
**(Germany) B Karbacher**	**6**	**6**
(Czech Republic) S Doseděl	3	4
Q	**(Chile) M Ríos**	**7^{7}**	**6**
5	(Spain) À Corretja	6^{3}	4

Quarterfinals
(Uruguay) M Filippini	6^{7}	2
**(Spain) C Costa**	**7^{9}**	**6**
(Germany) B Karbacher	**7**	6^{2}	5
Q	**(Chile) M Ríos**	5	**7^{7}**	**7**

Semifinals
(Spain) C Costa	6^{1}	0
Q	(Chile) **M Ríos**	**7^{7}**	**6**

=== Section 2 ===
First round
6	(Netherlands) P Haarhuis	3	3
**(Netherlands) J Siemerink**	**6**	**6**
(Spain) A Costa	**6**	2	4
**(Russia) A Chesnokov**	3	**6**	**6**
WC	(Germany) M-K Goellner	2	**7**	3
Q	**(United States) F Montana**	**6**	5	**6**
**(Czech Republic) B Ulihrach**	**6**	**7**
3	(Italy) A Gaudenzi	2	5
7	**(Czech Republic) K Nováček**	**6**	**6**
(Norway) C Ruud	3	3
Q	**(Germany) M Geserer**	**6**	**7^{7}**
Q	(France) J Hanquez	3	6^{1}
(Spain) J Sánchez	2	2
**(Austria) G Schaller**	**6**	**6**
(Spain) E Sánchez	3	4
2	**(Spain) A Berasategui**	**6**	**6**

Second round
**(Netherlands) J Siemerink**	**6**	**6**
(Russia) A Chesnokov	3	4
Q	(United States) F Montana	**6**	1	2
**(Czech Republic) B Ulihrach**	4	**6**	**6**
7	**(Czech Republic) K Nováček**	**6**	**7**
Q	(Germany) M Geserer	4	5
**(Austria) G Schaller**	6^{5}	**7^{7}**	**6**
2	(Spain) A Berasategui	**7^{7}**	6^{4}	3

Quarterfinals
**(Netherlands) J Siemerink**	**6**	3	**6**
(Czech Republic) B Ulihrach	3	**6**	3
7	(Czech Republic) K Nováček	**7^{9}**	4	4
**(Austria) G Schaller**	6^{7}	**6**	**6**

Semifinals
(Netherlands) **J Siemerink**	**7^{8}**	6^{4}	**6**
(Austria) G Schaller	6^{6}	**7^{7}**	4
