= 1997 Dutch Open (tennis) =

- Date: 28 July – 3 August
- Edition: 40th
- Category: World Series
- Draw: 32S / 16D
- Prize money: $475,000
- Surface: Clay / outdoor
- Location: Amsterdam, Netherlands

Champions

Singles
- (Czech Republic) Ctislav Doseděl

Doubles
- (Australia) Paul Kilderry / (Ecuador) Nicolás Lapentti
- Dutch Open

The 1997 Dutch Open was an ATP men's tennis tournament held in Amsterdam, Netherlands that was part of the World Series category of the 1997 ATP Tour. It was the 40th edition of the tournament and was held from 28 July to 3 August. Unseeded Ctislav Doseděl won his first title of the year, and the third of his career.

== Finals ==
=== Singles ===
(Czech Republic) Ctislav Doseděl defeated (Spain) Carlos Moyá 7–6^{(7–4)}, 7–6^{(7–5)}, 6–7^{(4–7)}, 6–2

- It was Doseděl's only singles title of the year and the 3rd and last of his career.

=== Doubles ===
(Australia) Paul Kilderry / (Ecuador) Nicolás Lapentti defeated (Australia) Andrew Kratzmann / (Belgium) Libor Pimek 3–6, 7–5, 7–6
