= 1998 ATP German Open =

- Date: 4–11 May
- Edition: 92nd
- Category: ATP Super 9
- Draw: 56S / 28D
- Prize money: $2,200,000
- Surface: Clay / outdoor
- Location: Hamburg, Germany
- Venue: Rothenbaum Tennis Center

Champions

Singles
- (Spain) Albert Costa

Doubles
- (United States) Donald Johnson / (United States) Francisco Montana
| ← 1997 · | ATP German Open | · 1999 → |

The 1998 German Open was a men's tennis tournament played on outdoor clay courts. It was the 92nd edition of the Hamburg Masters (German Open), and was part of the ATP Super 9 of the 1998 ATP Tour. It took place at the Rothenbaum Tennis Center in Hamburg, Germany, from through 4 May through 11 May 1998.

The men's field was headlined by ATP No. 1, Indian Wells, Miami, Auckland titlist, Australian Open finalist Marcelo Ríos, Antwerp winner, Indian Wells and 1997 U.S. Open runner-up Greg Rusedski and Marseille runner-up, 1994 Hamburg winner Yevgeny Kafelnikov. Other top seeds competing were Dubai titlist Àlex Corretja, Gustavo Kuerten, Karol Kučera, Richard Krajicek and Alberto Berasategui.

== Finals ==
=== Singles ===
(Spain) Albert Costa defeated (Spain) Àlex Corretja 6–2, 6–0, 1–0, retired.

- It was Albert Costa's 1st title of the year, and his 7th overall. It was his 1st Masters title of the year, and overall.

=== Doubles ===
(United States) Donald Johnson / (United States) Francisco Montana defeated (South Africa) David Adams / (New Zealand) Brett Steven 6–4, 6–4
