= 1998 Dutch Open – Doubles =

Tennis tournament held in the Netherlands

Doubles
- 1998 Dutch Open

Final
- Champions: (Australia) Jacco Eltingh (Netherlands) Paul Haarhuis
- Runners-up: (Slovakia) Dominik Hrbatý (Slovakia) Karol Kučera
- Score: 6–3, 6–2

Events
Singles	men	women
Doubles	men	women
← 1997 ·	Dutch Open	· 1999 →

The 1998 Dutch Open was an ATP-tournament held in Amsterdam, Netherlands. The tournament was held from August 3 to August 9.

== Seeds ==
Champion seeds are indicated in bold text while text in italics indicates the round in which those seeds were eliminated.

1. (Netherlands) **Jacco Eltingh / (Netherlands) Paul Haarhuis (champions)**
2. (United Kingdom) Neil Broad / (South Africa) Piet Norval (first round)
3. (Netherlands) Tom Kempers / (Argentina) Daniel Orsanic (first round)
4. (Czech Republic) Jiří Novák / (Czech Republic) David Rikl (first round)

== Draw ==
=== Key ===
- Q = Qualifier
- WC = Wild card
- LL = Lucky loser
- Alt = Alternate
- ITF = ITF entry
- PR = Protected ranking
- SR = Special ranking
- SE = Special exempt
- JE = Junior exempt
- JR = Junior Accelerator Programme entrant
- CO = College Accelerator Programme entrant
- NG = Next Gen Accelerator Program entrant
- w/o = Walkover
- r = Retired
- d = Defaulted

=== Finals ===
First round
1	(Netherlands) **J Eltingh** **(Netherlands) P Haarhuis**	4	**6**	**6**
(South Africa) C Haggard (United States) J Waite	**6**	3	3
(Netherlands) **J van Lottum** **(Netherlands) D van Scheppingen**	**7**	6	**6**
(Czech Republic) L Pimek (Czech Republic) T Anzari	6	**7**	4
(Sweden) **F Bergh** **(Czech Republic) P Vízner**	**6**	6	**6**
3	(Netherlands) T Kempers (Argentina) D Orsanic	4	**7**	3
(Argentina) **M Hood** **(Belgium) T Vanhoudt**	**7**	**6**
(Netherlands) S Noteboom (Argentina) M Puerta	6	1
(Czech Republic) **C Doseděl** **(Russia) A Olhovskiy**	4	**7**	**6**
(South Africa) M Barnard (South Africa) B Barnard	**6**	6	1
(Hungary) **G Köves** **(South Africa) P Rosner**	**6**	4	**7**
4	(Czech Republic) J Novák (Czech Republic) D Rikl	2	**6**	6
(Socialist Federal Republic of Yugoslavia) **N Djordjevic** **(Australia) J Holmes**	**7**	6	**6**
(Argentina) P Albano (Brazil) F Meligeni	6	**7**	1
(Slovakia) **D Hrbatý** **(Slovakia) K Kučera**	5	**6**	**6**
2	(United Kingdom) N Broad (South Africa) P Norval	**7**	4	3

Quarterfinals
1	(Netherlands) **J Eltingh** **(Netherlands) P Haarhuis**	**6**	3	**6**
(Netherlands) J van Lottum (Netherlands) D van Scheppingen	3	**6**	3
(Sweden) **F Bergh** **(Czech Republic) P Vízner**	**6**	3	**6**
(Argentina) M Hood (Belgium) T Vanhoudt	1	**6**	2
(Czech Republic) **C Doseděl** **(Russia) A Olhovskiy**	w/o
(Hungary) G Köves (South Africa) P Rosner
(Socialist Federal Republic of Yugoslavia) N Djordjevic (Australia) J Holmes	5	**7**	2
(Slovakia) **D Hrbatý** **(Slovakia) K Kučera**	**7**	6	**6**

Semifinals
1	(Netherlands) **J Eltingh** **(Netherlands) P Haarhuis**	**6**	3	**6**
(Sweden) F Bergh (Czech Republic) P Vízner	3	**6**	3
(Czech Republic) C Doseděl (Russia) A Olhovskiy	**6**	3	4
(Slovakia) **D Hrbatý** **(Slovakia) K Kučera**	2	**6**	**6**

Final
1	(Netherlands) **J Eltingh** **(Netherlands) P Haarhuis**	**6**	**6**
(Slovakia) D Hrbatý (Slovakia) K Kučera	3	2
