= 1998 ATP German Open – Singles =

Singles
- 1998 ATP German Open

Final
- Champion: (Spain) Albert Costa
- Runner-up: (Spain) Àlex Corretja
- Score: 6–2, 6–0, 1–0 (retired)

Details
- Draw: 56
- Seeds: 16

Events
Singles	Doubles
← 1997 ·	ATP German Open	· 1999 →

Albert Costa won the singles tennis title at the 1998 Hamburg European Open after Àlex Corretja retired from the final, with the scoreline at 6–2, 6–0, 1–0.

Andriy Medvedev was the defending champion, but lost in the first round to Costa.

== Seeds ==
A champion seed is indicated in bold text while text in italics indicates the round in which that seed was eliminated. The top eight seeds received a bye into the second round.

1. (Chile) Marcelo Ríos (second round)
2. (United Kingdom) Greg Rusedski (third round)
3. (Russia) Yevgeny Kafelnikov (second round)
4. (Spain) Álex Corretja (final, retired)
5. (Brazil) Gustavo Kuerten (quarterfinals)
6. (Slovakia) Karol Kučera (semifinals, retired)
7. (Netherlands) Richard Krajicek (third round)
8. (Spain) Alberto Berasategui (third round)
9. (Spain) Félix Mantilla (semifinals)
10. (Spain) Carlos Moyà (first round)
11. (United States) Michael Chang (second round)
12. (United Kingdom) Tim Henman (second round)
13. (Spain) Sergi Bruguera (third round)
14. (Sweden) Magnus Norman (first round)
15. (Germany) Nicolas Kiefer (first round)
16. (Croatia) Goran Ivanišević (quarterfinals, retired)

== Draw ==
=== Key ===
- Q = Qualifier
- WC = Wild card
- LL = Lucky loser
- Alt = Alternate
- SE = Special exempt
- PR = Protected ranking
- ITF = ITF entry
- JE = Junior exempt
- w/o = Walkover
- r = Retired
- d = Defaulted
- SR = Special ranking

=== Finals ===
Semifinals
(Spain) **Álbert Costa**	3
6	(Slovakia) Karol Kučera	0^{r}
4	(Spain) **Álex Corretja**	**6**	3	**6**
9	(Spain) Félix Mantilla	2	**6**	3

Final
(Spain) **Álbert Costa**	**6**	**6**	1
4	(Spain) Álex Corretja	2	0	0^{r}

=== Top half ===
==== Section 1 ====
First round
(South Africa) **W Ferreira**	**6**	**6**
(Netherlands) J Siemerink	4	2
(Ukraine) A Medvedev	3	**6**	6^{3}
(Spain) **Á Costa**	**6**	1	**7^{7}**
WC	(Germany) **O Gross**	3	**6**	**6**
15	(Germany) N Kiefer	**6**	2	1
10	(Spain) C Moyà	2	5
(Germany) **T Haas**	**6**	**7**
(Spain) C Costa	3	3
(France) **F Santoro**	**6**	**6**
(Netherlands) **S Schalken**	**6**	1
(Switzerland) M Rosset	2	0^{r}

Second round
1	(Chile) M Ríos	**6**	4	3
(South Africa) **W Ferreira**	4	**6**	**6**
(Spain) **Á Costa**	**6**	**6**
WC	(Germany) O Gross	2	2
(Germany) T Haas	4	4
(France) **F Santoro**	**6**	**6**
(Netherlands) S Schalken	6^{6}	2
7/WC	(Netherlands) **R Krajicek**	**7^{8}**	**6**

Third round
(South Africa) W Ferreira	3	3
(Spain) **Á Costa**	**6**	**6**
(France) **F Santoro**	**7**	**7^{7}**
7/WC	(Netherlands) R Krajicek	5	6^{3}

Quarterfinals
(Spain) **Á Costa**	**6**	**6**
(France) F Santoro	3	4

==== Section 2 ====
First round
(Austria) **T Muster**	**6**	**6**
(Spain) A Portas	2	0
Q	(Spain) F Vicente	5	4
(Belgium) **F Dewulf**	**7**	**6**
Q	(Germany) **J Knippschild**	**6**	**6**
14	(Sweden) M Norman	3	0
11/WC	(United States) **M Chang**	**6**	3	**6**
WC	(Germany) D Prinosil	4	**6**	1
(Spain) **F Clavet**	**6**	2	**6**
(Germany) M-K Goellner	4	**6**	4
(Australia) **R Fromberg**	**6**	6^{7}	**6**
(Uruguay) M Filippini	3	**7^{9}**	4

Second round
3	(Russia) Y Kafelnikov	4	2
(Austria) **T Muster**	**6**	**6**
(Belgium) F Dewulf	4	3
Q	(Germany) **J Knippschild**	**6**	**6**
11/WC	(United States) M Chang	3	**7^{7}**	2
(Spain) **F Clavet**	**6**	6^{4}	**6**
(Australia) R Fromberg	2	1
6	(Slovakia) **K Kučera**	**6**	**6**

Third round
(Austria) **T Muster**	**6**	**6**
Q	(Germany) J Knippschild	1	4
(Spain) F Clavet	2	2
6	(Slovakia) **K Kučera**	**6**	**6**

Quarterfinals
(Austria) T Muster	3	2
6	(Slovakia) **K Kučera**	**6**	**6**

=== Bottom half ===
==== Section 3 ====
First round
(Slovakia) D Hrbatý	0	2
(Czech Republic) **S Doseděl**	**6**	**6**
(Morocco) **H Arazi**	**7**	**7**
(Italy) A Gaudenzi	5	5
Q	(Sweden) J Apell	3	2
12	(United Kingdom) **T Henman**	**6**	**6**
13	(Spain) **S Bruguera**	**6**	**6**
Q	(Spain) J Díaz	2	1
(France) **N Escudé**	**6**	**7^{8}**
(Spain) J Alonso	4	6^{6}
(Morocco) **K Alami**	**7**	**6**
WC	(Germany) M Sinner	5	2

Second round
5	(Brazil) **G Kuerten**	**6**	**6**
(Czech Republic) S Doseděl	4	4
(Morocco) **H Arazi**	**6**	**6**
12	(United Kingdom) T Henman	3	3
13	(Spain) **S Bruguera**	**6**	**6**
(France) N Escudé	0	2
(Morocco) K Alami	2	**6**	3
4	(Spain) **Á Corretja**	**6**	4	**6**

Third round
5	(Brazil) **G Kuerten**	**6**	4	**6**
(Morocco) H Arazi	1	**6**	2
13	(Spain) S Bruguera	**7^{7}**	4	3
4	(Spain) **Á Corretja**	6^{0}	**6**	**6**

Quarterfinals
5	(Brazil) G Kuerten	**6**	6^{8}	4
4	(Spain) **Á Corretja**	4	**7^{10}**	**6**

==== Section 4 ====
First round
(Germany) B Becker	5	4
(Sweden) **M Gustafsson**	**7**	**6**
(Czech Republic) **B Ulihrach**	**6**	4	**6**
Q	(Germany) B Karbacher	3	**6**	2
(France) G Raoux	4	r
9	(Spain) **F Mantilla**	**6**
16	(Croatia) **G Ivanišević**	4	**6**	**6**
(Spain) G Blanco	**6**	4	3
(New Zealand) B Steven	4	4
(Ecuador) **N Lapentti**	**6**	**6**
Q	(Italy) M Martelli	1	5
Q	(Spain) **E Benfele Álvarez**	**6**	**7**

Second round
8	(Spain) **A Berasategui**	**6**	**6**
(Sweden) M Gustafsson	3	3
(Czech Republic) B Ulihrach	4	2
9	(Spain) **F Mantilla**	**6**	**6**
16	(Croatia) **G Ivanišević**	4	**6**	**6**
(Ecuador) N Lapentti	**6**	1	4
Q	(Spain) E Benfele Álvarez	6^{3}	**6**	3
2	(United Kingdom) **G Rusedski**	**7^{7}**	0	**6**

Third round
8	(Spain) A Berasategui	**6**	6^{5}	6^{4}
9	(Spain) **F Mantilla**	1	**7^{7}**	**7^{7}**
16	(Croatia) **G Ivanišević**	**6**	**6**
2	(United Kingdom) G Rusedski	4	2

Quarterfinals
9	(Spain) **F Mantilla**	**6**	2
16	(Croatia) G Ivanišević	0	0^{r}
