= 1999 ATP German Open – Singles =

Singles
- 1999 ATP German Open

Final
- Champion: (Chile) Marcelo Ríos
- Runner-up: (Argentina) Mariano Zabaleta
- Score: 6–7^{(5–7)}, 7–5, 5–7, 7–6^{(7–5)}, 6–2

Details
- Draw: 56
- Seeds: 16

Events
Singles	Doubles
← 1998 ·	ATP German Open	· 2000 →

Marcelo Ríos defeated Mariano Zabaleta in the final, 6–7^{(5–7)}, 7–5, 5–7, 7–6^{(7–5)}, 6–2 to win the singles tennis title at the 1999 Hamburg European Open.

Albert Costa was the defending champion, but was defeated in the second round by Zabaleta.

== Seeds ==
A champion seed is indicated in bold text while text in italics indicates the round in which that seed was eliminated. The top eight seeds received a bye into the second round.

1. (Netherlands) Richard Krajicek (second round)
2. (Spain) Carlos Moyà (semifinals)
3. (United Kingdom) Tim Henman (quarterfinals)
4. (Chile) **Marcelo Ríos (champion)**
5. (United Kingdom) Greg Rusedski (second round)
6. (Spain) Álbert Costa (second round)
7. (Spain) Félix Mantilla (second round)
8. (Brazil) Gustavo Kuerten (quarterfinals)
9. (Croatia) Goran Ivanišević (first round)
10. (Sweden) Thomas Johansson (first round)
11. (Germany) Tommy Haas (quarterfinals)
12. (Spain) Francisco Clavet (third round)
13. (South Africa) Wayne Ferreira (third round)
14. (France) Cédric Pioline (first round)
15. (Switzerland) Marc Rosset (second round)
16. (Russia) Marat Safin (second round)

== Draw ==
=== Key ===
- Q = Qualifier
- WC = Wild card
- LL = Lucky loser
- Alt = Alternate
- SE = Special exempt
- PR = Protected ranking
- ITF = ITF entry
- JE = Junior exempt
- w/o = Walkover
- r = Retired
- d = Defaulted
- SR = Special ranking

=== Finals ===
Semifinals
(Ecuador) Nicolás Lapentti	5	2
(Argentina) **Mariano Zabaleta**	**7**	**6**
4	(Chile) **Marcelo Ríos**	**6**	**7^{7}**
2	(Spain) Carlos Moyà	4	6^{4}

Final
(Argentina) Mariano Zabaleta	**7^{7}**	5	**7**	6^{5}	2
4	(Chile) **Marcelo Ríos**	6^{5}	**7**	5	**7^{7}**	**6**

=== Top half ===
==== Section 1 ====
First round
(Morocco) **H Arazi**	**6**	**6**
Q	(France) R Gilbert	4	2
WC	(Germany) L Burgsmüller	4	3
(Ecuador) **N Lapentti**	**6**	**6**
(Netherlands) P Haarhuis	3	4
15	(Switzerland) **M Rosset**	**6**	**6**
10	(Sweden) T Johansson	5	1
(Brazil) **F Meligeni**	**7**	**6**
(Morocco) Y El Aynaoui	**7**	4	1
(Czech Republic) **J Novák**	5	**6**	**6**
(Italy) D Sanguinetti	3	2
Q	(France) **A Di Pasquale**	**6**	**6**

Second round
1	(Netherlands) R Krajicek	4	6^{3}
(Morocco) **H Arazi**	**6**	**7^{7}**
(Ecuador) **N Lapentti**	**6**	**6**
15	(Switzerland) M Rosset	2	0
(Brazil) F Meligeni	2	**6**	1
(Czech Republic) **J Novák**	**6**	3	**6**
Q	(France) **A Di Pasquale**	**6**	4	**6**
7	(Spain) F Mantilla	4	**6**	0

Third round
(Morocco) H Arazi	4	0
(Ecuador) **N Lapentti**	**6**	**6**
(Czech Republic) J Novák	6^{6}	6^{4}
Q	(France) **A Di Pasquale**	**7^{8}**	**7^{7}**

Quarterfinals
(Ecuador) **N Lapentti**	**6**	6^{6}	**6**
Q	(France) A Di Pasquale	4	**7^{8}**	2

==== Section 2 ====
First round
(Argentina) **F Squillari**	**6**	1	**7^{7}**
WC	(Germany) H Dreekmann	1	**6**	6^{5}
(Norway) C Ruud	3	3
(Argentina) **M Puerta**	**6**	**6**
(France) **F Santoro**	3	**6**	**6**
14	(France) C Pioline	**6**	3	2
12	(Spain) **F Clavet**	**6**	**6**
(Slovakia) D Hrbatý	0	4
(Italy) A Gaudenzi	3	4
(Morocco) **K Alami**	**6**	**6**
(Argentina) **M Zabaleta**	**6**	**6**
(Czech Republic) B Ulihrach	3	2

Second round
3	(United Kingdom) **T Henman**	**6**	**6**
(Argentina) F Squillari	3	3
(Argentina) **M Puerta**	**6**	**6**
(France) F Santoro	2	2
12	(Spain) **F Clavet**	1	**7^{7}**	**7^{7}**
(Morocco) K Alami	**6**	6^{5}	6^{5}
(Argentina) **M Zabaleta**	**7**	**6**
6	(Spain) Á Costa	5	2

Third round
3	(United Kingdom) **T Henman**	**6**	**6**
(Argentina) M Puerta	4	1
12	(Spain) F Clavet	6^{5}	**7^{7}**	4
(Argentina) **M Zabaleta**	**7^{7}**	6^{1}	**6**

Quarterfinals
3	(United Kingdom) T Henman	**6**	1	4
(Argentina) **M Zabaleta**	3	**6**	**6**

=== Bottom half ===
==== Section 3 ====
First round
(Italy) G Pozzi	2	5
(Spain) **A Berasategui**	**6**	**7**
Q	(Finland) **T Ketola**	**6**	**7**
(Paraguay) R Delgado	3	5
(Spain) F Vicente	3	**6**	2
11	(Germany) **T Haas**	**6**	3	**6**
13	(South Africa) **W Ferreira**	**7**	**7**
WC	(Germany) M Kohlmann	5	5
(United States) M Chang	**7^{7}**	1	6^{5}
(Netherlands) **S Schalken**	6^{3}	**6**	**7^{7}**
Q	(Germany) **O Gross**	**6**	**6**
(Australia) A Ilie	4	2

Second round
5	(United Kingdom) G Rusedski	4	5
(Spain) **A Berasategui**	**6**	**7**
Q	(Finland) T Ketola	5	4
11	(Germany) **T Haas**	**7**	**6**
13	(South Africa) **W Ferreira**	**6**	**6**
(Netherlands) S Schalken	4	3
Q	(Germany) O Gross	6^{6}	5
4	(Chile) **M Ríos**	**7^{8}**	**7**

Third round
(Spain) A Berasategui	3	**6**	4
11	(Germany) **T Haas**	**6**	1	**6**
13	(South Africa) W Ferreira	1	**6**	2
4	(Chile) **M Ríos**	**6**	3	**6**

Quarterfinals
11	(Germany) T Haas	4	4
4	(Chile) **M Ríos**	**6**	**6**

==== Section 4 ====
First round
(United States) **J-M Gambill**	3	**6**	**6**
Q	(Sweden) F Jonsson	**6**	2	3
WC	(Germany) M Hantschk	1	3
(Czech Republic) **S Doseděl**	**6**	**6**
(Germany) **R Schüttler**	**6**	**6**
9	(Croatia) G Ivanišević	1	3
16	(Russia) **M Safin**	**6**	**7^{7}**
(Czech Republic) D Vacek	3	6^{3}
(Germany) D Prinosil	3	2
Q	(Romania) **A Voinea**	**6**	**6**
(Slovakia) J Krošlák	**6**	5	4
Q	(Italy) **M Meneschincheri**	1	**7**	**6**

Second round
8	(Brazil) **G Kuerten**	**6**	**6**
(United States) J-M Gambill	4	4
(Czech Republic) S Doseděl	3	3
(Germany) **R Schüttler**	**6**	**6**
16	(Russia) M Safin	**6**	3	3
Q	(Romania) **A Voinea**	4	**6**	**6**
Q	(Italy) M Meneschincheri	3	5
2	(Spain) **C Moyà**	**6**	**7**

Third round
8	(Brazil) **G Kuerten**	**6**	**6**
(Germany) R Schüttler	4	3
Q	(Romania) A Voinea	5	6^{5}
2	(Spain) **C Moyà**	**7**	**7^{7}**

Quarterfinals
8	(Brazil) G Kuerten	0	2
2	(Spain) **C Moyà**	**6**	**6**
