= 1993 Dutch Open – Doubles =

Doubles
- 1993 Dutch Open

Final
- Champions: (Netherlands) Jacco Eltingh (Netherlands) Paul Haarhuis
- Runners-up: (Netherlands) Hendrik Jan Davids (Belgium) Libor Pimek
- Score: 4–6, 6–2, 7–5

Events
Singles	Doubles
- Dutch Open

Paul Haarhuis and Mark Koevermans were the defending champions, but Koevermans did not compete this year.

Haarhuis teamed up with Jacco Eltingh and successfully defended his title by defeating Hendrik Jan Davids and Libor Pimek 4–6, 6–2, 7–5 in the final.

== Seeds ==
1. (Netherlands) Jacco Eltingh / (Netherlands) Paul Haarhuis (champions)
2. (Spain) Sergio Casal / (Spain) Emilio Sánchez (first round)
3. (Netherlands) Tom Nijssen / (Czech Republic) Cyril Suk (semifinals)
4. (South Africa) David Adams / (Russia) Andrei Olhovskiy (first round)

== Draw ==
Key

- Q = Qualifier
- WC = Wild card
- LL = Lucky loser
- Alt = Alternate
- ITF = ITF entry
- PR = Protected ranking
- SR = Special ranking
- SE = Special exempt
- JE = Junior exempt
- JR = Junior Accelerator Programme entrant
- CO = College Accelerator Programme entrant
- NG = Next Gen Accelerator Program entrant
- w/o = Walkover
- r = Retired
- d = Defaulted

=== Draw ===
First round
1	(Netherlands) J Eltingh (Netherlands) P Haarhuis	5	6	6
(Sweden) C Allgårdh (Australia) S Youl	7	4	4
(Sweden) J Björkman (United States) B Devening	6	6
(Argentina) H de la Peña (Mexico) J Lozano	4	2
3	(Netherlands) T Nijssen (Czech Republic) C Suk	6	6
Q	(Sweden) M Renström (Sweden) M Tillström	3	3
(Czech Republic) V Flégl (Denmark) M Mortensen	7	2	6
(Sweden) J Apell (Sweden) J Donar	6	6	4
(Brazil) J Oncins (Spain) J Sánchez	7	4	6
(Germany) MK Goellner (South Africa) M Ondruska	6	6	7
(Netherlands) M Oosting (Germany) U Riglewski	7	6
4	(South Africa) D Adams (Russia) A Olhovskiy	6	5
WC	(Russia) A Cherkasov (Russia) A Chesnokov	3	1
WC	(Spain) F Clavet (Spain) C Costa	6	6
(Netherlands) HJ Davids (Belgium) L Pimek	6	6	6
2	(Spain) S Casal (Spain) E Sánchez	3	7	3

Quarterfinals
1	(Netherlands) J Eltingh (Netherlands) P Haarhuis	6	7
(Sweden) J Björkman (United States) B Devening	3	5
3	(Netherlands) T Nijssen (Czech Republic) C Suk	6	6
(Czech Republic) V Flégl (Denmark) M Mortensen	0	3
(Germany) MK Goellner (South Africa) M Ondruska	3	6
(Netherlands) M Oosting (Germany) U Riglewski	6	7
WC	(Spain) F Clavet (Spain) C Costa
(Netherlands) HJ Davids (Belgium) L Pimek	w/o

Semifinals
1	(Netherlands) J Eltingh (Netherlands) P Haarhuis	6	5	6
3	(Netherlands) T Nijssen (Czech Republic) C Suk	4	7	4
(Netherlands) M Oosting (Germany) U Riglewski	6	6	6
(Netherlands) HJ Davids (Belgium) L Pimek	7	3	7

Final
1	(Netherlands) J Eltingh (Netherlands) P Haarhuis	4	6	7
(Netherlands) HJ Davids (Belgium) L Pimek	6	2	5
