= 1996 Grolsch Open – Singles =

Singles
- 1996 Grolsch Open

Final
- Champion: (Spain) Francisco Clavet
- Runner-up: (Morocco) Younes El Aynaoui
- Score: 7–5, 6–1, 6–1

Details
- Draw: 32
- Seeds: 8

Events
Singles	Doubles
← 1995 ·	Grolsch Open	· 1997 →

Marcelo Ríos was the defending champion but lost in the second round to Adrian Voinea.

Francisco Clavet won in the final 7–5, 6–1, 6–1 against Younes El Aynaoui.

== Seeds ==
Champion seeds are indicated in bold while text in italics indicates the round in which that seed was eliminated.

1. (Chile) Marcelo Ríos (second round)
2. (Spain) Albert Costa (first round)
3. (Spain) Félix Mantilla (quarterfinals)
4. (Spain) Alberto Berasategui (second round)
5. (Spain) Carlos Moyá (quarterfinals)
6. (Spain) **Francisco Clavet (champion)**
7. (Czech Republic) Bohdan Ulihrach (second round)
8. (Spain) Carlos Costa (second round)

== Draw ==
=== Key ===
- Q = Qualifier
- WC = Wild card
- LL = Lucky loser
- Alt = Alternate
- SE = Special exempt
- PR = Protected ranking
- ITF = ITF entry
- JE = Junior exempt
- w/o = Walkover
- r = Retired
- d = Defaulted
- SR = Special ranking

=== Finals ===
Semifinals
(Romania) Adrian Voinea	3	4
6	(Spain) **Francisco Clavet**	**6**	**6**
(Netherlands) Dennis van Scheppingen	3	**7^{7}**	2
(Morocco) **Younes El Aynaoui**	**6**	6^{5}	**6**

Final
6	(Spain) **Francisco Clavet**	**7**	**6**	**6**
(Morocco) Younes El Aynaoui	5	1	1

=== Section 1 ===
First round
1	(Chile) **M Ríos**	**7**	**6**
(Hungary) S Noszály	5	2
(Denmark) F Fetterlein	2	4
(Romania) **A Voinea**	**6**	**6**
WC	(Netherlands) P Wessels	4	4
(Czech Republic) **C Doseděl**	**6**	**6**
(Czech Republic) D Rikl	2	3
8	(Spain) **C Costa**	**6**	**6**
3	(Spain) **F Mantilla**	**6**	**6**
WC	(Netherlands) J van Lottum	3	1
(Austria) **G Schaller**	**6**	**6**
(Spain) J Sánchez	4	4
(Spain) **J Burillo**	**7^{7}**	4	**6**
Q	(Netherlands) S Noteboom	6^{4}	**6**	3
WC	(Norway) C Ruud	6^{3}	3
6	(Spain) **F Clavet**	**7^{7}**	**6**

Second round
1	(Chile) M Ríos	0	5
(Romania) **A Voinea**	**6**	**7**
(Czech Republic) **C Doseděl**	**6**	**7**
8	(Spain) C Costa	2	5
3	(Spain) **F Mantilla**	**6**	**6**
(Austria) G Schaller	4	2
(Spain) J Burillo	4	1^{r}
6	(Spain) **F Clavet**	**6**	2

Quarterfinals
(Romania) **A Voinea**	**7^{9}**	**7**
(Czech Republic) C Doseděl	6^{7}	5
3	(Spain) F Mantilla	4	3
6	(Spain) **F Clavet**	**6**	**6**

Semifinals
(Romania) A Voinea	3	4
6	(Spain) **F Clavet**	**6**	**6**

=== Section 2 ===
First round
5	(Spain) **C Moyá**	**6**	**6**
Q	(Australia) G Doyle	2	2
Q	(Spain) G Blanco	**6**	2	4
(Russia) **A Volkov**	2	**6**	**6**
WC	(Netherlands) **D van Scheppingen**	**7^{7}**	**6**
WC	(Haiti) R Agénor	6^{5}	1
WC	(Uruguay) M Filippini	4	**6**	1
4	(Spain) **A Berasategui**	**6**	4	**6**
7	(Czech Republic) **B Ulihrach**	**7**	4	**6**
(Netherlands) S Schalken	5	**6**	0
(Spain) R Carretero	2	3
(Argentina) **H Gumy**	**6**	**6**
(Belgium) F Dewulf	**6**	4	1
(Morocco) **Y El Aynaoui**	4	**6**	**6**
Q	(Spain) G Puentes	4	2
2	(Spain) **A Costa**	**6**	**6**

Second round
5	(Spain) **C Moyá**	**6**	**6**
(Russia) A Volkov	0	2
WC	(Netherlands) **D van Scheppingen**	6^{1}	**6**	**7^{7}**
4	(Spain) A Berasategui	**7^{7}**	3	6^{2}
7	(Czech Republic) B Ulihrach	1	2
(Argentina) **H Gumy**	**6**	**6**
(Morocco) **Y El Aynaoui**	6^{7}	**7^{7}**	**7**
2	(Spain) A Costa	**7^{9}**	6^{5}	5

Quarterfinals
5	(Spain) C Moyá	6^{9}	2
WC	(Netherlands) **D van Scheppingen**	**7^{11}**	**6**
(Argentina) H Gumy	4	3
(Morocco) **Y El Aynaoui**	**6**	**6**

Semifinals
WC	(Netherlands) D van Scheppingen	3	**7^{7}**	2
(Morocco) **Y El Aynaoui**	**6**	6^{5}	**6**
