= 1999 ATP German Open – Doubles =

Doubles
- 1999 ATP German Open

Final
- Champions: (Australia) Wayne Arthurs (Australia) Andrew Kratzmann
- Runners-up: (Netherlands) Paul Haarhuis (United States) Jared Palmer
- Score: 2–6, 7–6^{(7–5)}, 6–2

Events
Singles	Doubles
← 1998 ·	ATP German Open	· 2000 →

The 1999 German Open was a tennis tournament played on outdoor clay courts. It was the 92nd edition of the Hamburg Masters (German Open), and was part of the ATP Super 9 of the 1999 ATP Tour. It took place at the Rothenbaum Tennis Center in Hamburg, Germany, from through 3 May through 10 May 1999.

== Seeds ==
Champion seeds are indicated in bold text while text in italics indicates the round in which those seeds were eliminated.

1. (India) Mahesh Bhupathi / (India) Leander Paes (second round)
2. (The Bahamas) Mark Knowles / (Canada) Daniel Nestor (quarterfinals)
3. (South Africa) Ellis Ferreira / (United States) Rick Leach (semifinals)
4. (France) Olivier Delaître / (France) Fabrice Santoro (semifinals)
5. (Czech Republic) Jiří Novák / (Czech Republic) David Rikl (quarterfinals)
6. (Australia) Andrew Florent / (Czech Republic) Daniel Vacek (quarterfinals)
7. (United States) Donald Johnson / (Czech Republic) Cyril Suk (second round)
8. (South Africa) David Adams / (South Africa) John-Laffnie de Jager (second round)

== Draw ==
=== Key ===
- Q = Qualifier
- WC = Wild card
- LL = Lucky loser
- Alt = Alternate
- ITF = ITF entry
- PR = Protected ranking
- SR = Special ranking
- SE = Special exempt
- JE = Junior exempt
- JR = Junior Accelerator Programme entrant
- CO = College Accelerator Programme entrant
- NG = Next Gen Accelerator Program entrant
- w/o = Walkover
- r = Retired
- d = Defaulted

=== Finals ===
Semifinals
(Australia) **Wayne Arthurs** **(Australia) Andrew Kratzmann**	**6**	**6**
3	(South Africa) Ellis Ferreira (United States) Rick Leach	4	4
4	(France) Olivier Delaître (France) Fabrice Santoro	**6**	3	4
(Netherlands) **Paul Haarhuis** **(United States) Jared Palmer**	3	**6**	**6**

Final
(Australia) **Wayne Arthurs** **(Australia) Andrew Kratzmann**	2	**7^{7}**	**6**
(Netherlands) Paul Haarhuis (United States) Jared Palmer	**6**	6^{5}	2

=== Top half ===
First round
(Spain) **Á López Morón** **(Italy) D Sanguinetti**	**6**	**6**
(Sweden) P Nyborg (Australia) P Tramacchi	3	4
(Australia) **W Arthurs** **(Australia) A Kratzmann**	**6**	5	**6**
(South Africa) W Ferreira (Spain) J Sánchez	3	**7**	4
8	(South Africa) **D Adams** **(South Africa) J-L de Jager**	**6**	6	**6**
(Brazil) G Kuerten (Ecuador) N Lapentti	3	**7**	4
(Argentina) **P Albano** **(Spain) T Carbonell**	**7**	**6**
(United States) R Reneberg (United States) J Stark	5	2
(Brazil) **F Meligeni** **(United States) F Montana**	**6**	4	**7**
(United Kingdom) T Henman (United Kingdom) G Rusedski	2	**6**	5
5	(Czech Republic) **J Novák** **(Czech Republic) D Rikl**	**6**	**6**
(South Africa) M Barnard (Argentina) D Orsanic	2	2

Second round
1	(India) M Bhupathi (India) L Paes
(Spain) **Á López Morón** **(Italy) D Sanguinetti**	w/o
(Australia) **W Arthurs** **(Australia) A Kratzmann**	**7**	**6**
8	(South Africa) D Adams (South Africa) J-L de Jager	6	4
(Argentina) P Albano (Spain) T Carbonell	6	2
3	(South Africa) **E Ferreira** **(United States) R Leach**	**7**	**6**
(Brazil) F Meligeni (United States) F Montana	2	1
5	(Czech Republic) **J Novák** **(Czech Republic) D Rikl**	**6**	**6**

Quarterfinals
(Spain) Á López Morón (Italy) D Sanguinetti	3	2
(Australia) **W Arthurs** **(Australia) A Kratzmann**	**6**	**6**
3	(South Africa) **E Ferreira** **(United States) R Leach**	**6**	**6**
5	(Czech Republic) J Novák (Czech Republic) D Rikl	3	4

Semifinals
(Australia) **W Arthurs** **(Australia) A Kratzmann**	**6**	**6**
3	(South Africa) E Ferreira (United States) R Leach	4	4

=== Bottom half ===
First round
6	(Australia) **A Florent** **(Czech Republic) D Vacek**	**6**	**7**
(South Africa) C Haggard (Russia) A Olhovskiy	3	6
(Germany) **L Burgsmüller** **(Germany) H Dreekmann**	**7**	**6**
(United Kingdom) N Broad (South Africa) R Koenig	6	4
(South Africa) **P Norval** **(Czech Republic) C Suk**	**7**	**6**
(Finland) T Ketola (North Macedonia) A Kitinov	5	3
7	(United States) **Donald Johnson** **(Czech Republic) Cyril Suk**	**6**	4	**6**
(Germany) M Kohlmann (Germany) D Prinosil	4	**6**	4
(Netherlands) **P Haarhuis** **(United States) J Palmer**	**6**	**7**
(United States) J Grabb (Australia) D Macpherson	2	5
(Germany) **J Knippschild** **(Germany) R Schüttler**	**6**	**6**
(South Africa) L Bale (South Africa) G Stafford	4	1

Second round
6	(Australia) **A Florent** **(Czech Republic) D Vacek**	**7**	**7**
(Germany) L Burgsmüller (Germany) H Dreekmann	6	5
(South Africa) P Norval (Czech Republic) C Suk	4	6
4	(France) **O Delaître** **(France) F Santoro**	**6**	**7**
7	(United States) D Johnson (Czech Republic) C Suk	6	6
(Netherlands) **P Haarhuis** **(United States) J Palmer**	**7**	**7**
(Germany) J Knippschild (Germany) R Schüttler	2	5
2	(The Bahamas) **M Knowles** **(Canada) D Nestor**	**6**	**7**

Quarterfinals
6	(Australia) A Florent (Czech Republic) D Vacek	**6**	6	4
4	(France) **O Delaître** **(France) F Santoro**	4	**7**	**6**
(Netherlands) **P Haarhuis** **(United States) J Palmer**	**6**	**7**
2	(The Bahamas) M Knowles (Canada) D Nestor	4	5

Semifinals
4	(France) O Delaître (France) F Santoro	**6**	3	4
(Netherlands) **P Haarhuis** **(United States) J Palmer**	3	**6**	**6**
