= 1998 Dutch Open (tennis) =

- Date: 3–9 August
- Edition: 41st
- Category: International Series
- Draw: 32S / 16D
- Prize money: $475,000
- Surface: Clay / outdoor
- Location: Amsterdam, Netherlands

Champions

Singles
- (Sweden) Magnus Norman

Doubles
- (Netherlands) Jacco Eltingh / (Netherlands) Paul Haarhuis
- Dutch Open

The 1998 Dutch Open was an Association of Tennis Professionals men's tennis tournament held on outdoor clay courts in Amsterdam, Netherlands. It was the 41st edition of the tournament and was held from 3 August until 9 August 1998. Unseeded Magnus Norman won his first title of the year, and the second of his career.

== Finals ==
=== Singles ===
(Sweden) Magnus Norman defeated (Australia) Richard Fromberg, 6–3, 6–3, 2–6, 6–4

- It was Norman's only singles title of the year and the 2nd of his career.

=== Doubles ===
(Netherlands) Jacco Eltingh / (Netherlands) Paul Haarhuis defeated (Slovakia) Dominik Hrbatý / (Slovakia) Karol Kučera, 6–3, 6–2
