= Richard Fromberg =

Australian tennis player

- Country (sports): Australia
- Residence: Melbourne, Victoria, Australia
- Born: 28 April 1970 (age 56) Ulverstone, Tasmania, Australia
- Height: 1.96 m (6 ft 5 in)
- Turned pro: 1988
- Retired: 2005
- Plays: Right-handed (two-handed backhand)
- Prize money: US$2,605,740

Singles
- Career record: 256–287
- Career titles: 4
- Highest ranking: No. 24 (13 August 1990)

Grand Slam singles results
- Australian Open: 4R (1993, 1998)
- French Open: 3R (1993)
- Wimbledon: 3R (1994)
- US Open: 3R (1992, 1993, 1994, 1999, 2000)

Other tournaments
- Olympic Games: 1R (1992)

Doubles
- Career record: 30–53
- Career titles: 2
- Highest ranking: No. 159 (2 February 1998)

Grand Slam doubles results
- Australian Open: 2R (1991, 1993)
- Wimbledon: Q3 (1992)
- US Open: 1R (1991)

Richard James Fromberg (born 28 April 1970) is a former professional tennis player from Australia.

== Tennis career ==
Fromberg began playing tennis at the age of 10. He was an Australian Institute of Sport scholarship holder. In 1987, he reached the Australian Open Junior finals in both singles and doubles. He turned professional in 1988. In 1990, he won his first top-level singles title in at Bologna, and his first tour doubles title in Schenectady, New York.

Fromberg played for Australia in two Davis Cup finals during his career. In 1990 he was part of the team which lost 3–2 in the final to the United States (winning one singles rubber against Michael Chang, and losing another in five sets to Andre Agassi). In 1993 he was on the team which lost 4–1 in the final to Germany (winning one singles match-up against Marc-Kevin Goellner, and losing the other to Michael Stich). He had an 11–4 career Davis Cup record (10–4 in singles and 1–0 in doubles).

Fromberg's best performances at Grand Slam events came in reaching the fourth round of the Australian Open in 1993 and 1998.

During his career, Fromberg won four singles titles and two doubles titles. His career-high singles ranking was World No. 24 (in 1990). His career prize money totalled US$2,605,740.

== ATP career finals ==
=== Singles: 11 (4 titles, 7 runner-ups) ===
Legend Grand Slam Tournaments (0–0) ATP World Tour Finals (0–0) ATP World Tour Masters Series (0–0) ATP Championship Series (0–0) ATP World Series (4-7)	Finals by surface Hard (1–3) Clay (3–4) Grass (0–0) Carpet (0–0)	Finals by setting Outdoors (4–7) Indoors (0–0)

Result	W–L	Date	Tournament	Tier	Surface	Opponent	Score
Loss	0–1	May 1990	Singapore, Singapore	World Series	Hard	(United States) Kelly Jones	4–6, 6–2, 6–7^{(4–7)}
Win	1–1	May 1990	Bologna, Italy	World Series	Clay	(Switzerland) Marc Rosset	4–6, 6–4, 7–6^{(7–5)}
Win	2–1	Jul 1990	Båstad, Sweden	World Series	Clay	(Sweden) Magnus Larsson	6–2, 7–6^{(7–5)}
Win	3–1	Jan 1991	Wellington, New Zealand	World Series	Hard	(Sweden) Lars Jönsson	6–1, 6–4, 6–4
Loss	3–2	May 1993	Tampa, United States	World Series	Clay	(Peru) Jaime Yzaga	4–6, 2–6
Loss	3–3	Jun 1994	Florence, Italy	World Series	Clay	(Uruguay) Marcelo Filippini	6–3, 3–6, 3–6
Loss	3–4	Aug 1994	Hilversum, Netherlands	World Series	Clay	(Czech Republic) Karel Nováček	5–7, 4–6, 6–7^{(7–9)}
Loss	3–5	Jan 1995	Sydney, Australia	World Series	Hard	(United States) Patrick McEnroe	2–6, 6–7^{(4–7)}
Win	4–5	Sep 1997	Bucharest, Romania	World Series	Clay	(Italy) Andrea Gaudenzi	6–1, 7–6^{(7–2)}
Loss	4–6	Jan 1998	Auckland, New Zealand	World Series	Hard	(Chile) Marcelo Ríos	6–4, 4–6, 6–7^{(3–7)}
Loss	4–7	Aug 1998	Amsterdam, Netherlands	International Series	Clay	(Sweden) Magnus Norman	3–6, 3–6, 6–2, 4–6

=== Doubles: 2 (2 titles) ===
Legend Grand Slam Tournaments (0–0) ATP World Tour Finals (0–0) ATP World Tour Masters Series (0–0) ATP Championship Series (0–0) ATP World Series (2–0)	Finals by surface Hard (1–0) Clay (1–0) Grass (0–0) Carpet (0–0)	Finals by setting Outdoors (2–0) Indoors (0–0)

Result	W–L	Date	Tournament	Tier	Surface	Partner	Opponents	Score
Win	1–0	Aug 1990	Schenectady, United States	World Series	Hard	(United States) Brad Pearce	(United States) Brian Garrow (United States) Sven Salumaa	6–2, 3–6, 7–6
Win	2–0	Jul 1997	Kitzbühel, Austria	World Series	Clay	(Australia) Wayne Arthurs	(Austria) Thomas Buchmayer (Austria) Thomas Strengberger	6–3, 6–3

== ATP Challenger and ITF Futures finals ==
=== Singles: 10 (10–0) ===
Legend ATP Challenger (10–0) ITF Futures (0–0)	Finals by surface Hard (4–0) Clay (5–0) Grass (0–0) Carpet (1–0)

Result	W–L	Date	Tournament	Tier	Surface	Opponent	Score
Win	1–0	Nov 1989	Ilheus, Brazil	Challenger	Hard	(France) Jean-Philippe Fleurian	3–6, 6–3, 6–2
Win	2–0	Mar 1992	Indian Wells, United States	Challenger	Hard	(Australia) Todd Woodbridge	6–4, 6–1
Win	3–0	Nov 1992	Manila, Philippines	Challenger	Hard	(Australia) Neil Borwick	7–6, 6–4
Win	4–0	Nov 1992	Launceston, Australia	Challenger	Carpet	(South Africa) David Nainkin	6–1, 6–3
Win	5–0	Jun 1993	Turin, Italy	Challenger	Clay	(Argentina) Horacio de la Peña	6–1, 7–6
Win	6–0	Sep 1996	Oporto, Portugal	Challenger	Clay	(Spain) Galo Blanco	6–3, 7–6
Win	7–0	Dec 1996	Perth, Australia	Challenger	Hard	(New Zealand) Steven Downs	6–0, 6–3
Win	8–0	Sep 1997	Szczecin, Poland	Challenger	Clay	(Ecuador) Nicolás Lapentti	6–7, 6–4, 6–3
Win	9–0	Jun 1998	Prostějov, Czech Republic	Challenger	Clay	(Australia) Andrew Ilie	6–2, 6–2
Win	10–0	Jun 1999	Prostějov, Czech Republic	Challenger	Clay	(Spain) Juan Carlos Ferrero	7–6, 5–7, 6–4

=== Doubles: 3 (3–0) ===
Legend ATP Challenger (3–0) ITF Futures (0–0)	Finals by surface Hard (1–0) Clay (1–0) Grass (0–0) Carpet (1–0)

Result	W–L	Date	Tournament	Tier	Surface	Partner	Opponents	Score
DNP	0–0	Apr 1989	Martinique, Martinique	Challenger	Hard	(Australia) Johan Anderson	(United States) David Wheaton (Australia) Todd Woodbridge	not played
Win	1–0	Nov 1992	Manila, Philippines	Challenger	Hard	(New Zealand) Steve Guy	(Italy) Massimo Ardinghi (Italy) Mario Visconti	6–3, 6–4
Win	2–0	Nov 1992	Launceston, Australia	Challenger	Carpet	(Australia) Patrick Rafter	(United Kingdom) Nick Brown (United Kingdom) Andrew Foster	7–5, 7–6
Win	3–0	Apr 2005	Canberra, Australia	Challenger	Clay	(Australia) Chris Guccione	(Austria) Werner Eschauer (Greece) Vasilis Mazarakis	6–1, 6–2

== Junior Grand Slam finals ==
=== Doubles: 1 (1 runner-up) ===
Result	Year	Tournament	Surface	Partner	Opponents	Score
Loss	1988	Australian Open	Grass	(Australia) Johan Anderson	(Australia) Jason Stoltenberg (Australia) Todd Woodbridge	3–6, 2–6

== Performance timelines ==
Key
W	F	SF	QF	#R	RR	Q#	DNQ	A	NH

(W) winner; (F) finalist; (SF) semifinalist; (QF) quarterfinalist; (#R) rounds 4, 3, 2, 1; (RR) round-robin stage; (Q#) qualification round; (DNQ) did not qualify; (A) absent; (NH) not held; (SR) strike rate (events won / competed); (W–L) win–loss record.

=== Singles ===
Tournament	1987	1988	1989	1990	1991	1992	1993	1994	1995	1996	1997	1998	1999	2000	2001	2002	SR	W–L	Win %
Grand Slam tournaments
Australian Open	Q1	2R	1R	1R	2R	1R	4R	2R	2R	1R	2R	4R	A	3R	1R	1R	0 / 14	13–14	48%
French Open	A	A	1R	1R	1R	2R	3R	2R	1R	2R	1R	1R	2R	1R	Q1	A	0 / 12	6–12	33%
Wimbledon	A	Q2	A	2R	1R	1R	1R	3R	A	1R	1R	1R	2R	1R	Q1	A	0 / 10	4–10	29%
US Open	A	A	A	1R	1R	3R	3R	3R	A	A	2R	1R	3R	3R	Q1	A	0 / 9	11–9	55%
Win–loss	0–0	1–1	0–2	1–4	1–4	3–4	7–4	6–4	1–2	1–3	2–4	3–4	4–3	4–4	0–1	0–1	0 / 45	34–45	43%
National Representation
Summer Olympics	NH	A	Not Held			1R	Not Held			A	Not Held			A	Not Held		0 / 1	0–1	0%
ATP Masters Series
Indian Wells	A	A	A	A	A	1R	A	A	1R	A	A	Q1	A	Q1	Q2	A	0 / 2	0–2	0%
Miami	A	A	2R	A	A	A	A	A	2R	A	A	A	A	3R	1R	A	0 / 4	3–4	43%
Monte Carlo	A	A	A	A	2R	A	A	1R	3R	A	Q1	1R	Q1	A	A	A	0 / 4	3–4	43%
Hamburg	A	A	A	A	1R	A	A	1R	1R	A	2R	2R	Q1	2R	A	A	0 / 6	3–6	33%
Rome	A	A	A	A	QF	A	A	2R	3R	A	Q1	1R	1R	A	A	A	0 / 5	6–5	55%
Canada	A	A	2R	A	A	A	A	A	A	A	A	A	A	A	A	A	0 / 1	1–1	50%
Cincinnati	A	A	A	QF	1R	A	A	A	A	A	A	A	A	A	A	A	0 / 2	3–2	60%
Stuttgart	A	A	A	A	A	A	A	A	A	A	A	1R	A	A	A	NMS	0 / 1	0–1	0%
Paris	A	A	A	1R	A	A	A	A	Q2	A	Q2	1R	A	A	A	A	0 / 2	0–2	0%
Win–loss	0–0	0–0	2–2	3–2	4–4	0–1	0–0	1–3	4–5	0–0	1–1	1–5	0–1	3–2	0–1	0–0	0 / 27	19–27	41%

=== Doubles ===
Tournament	1988	1989	1990	1991	1992	1993	1994	1995	1996	1997	1998	1999	2000	2001	2002	SR	W–L	Win %
Grand Slam tournaments
Australian Open	1R	1R	1R	2R	1R	2R	1R	1R	1R	A	1R	A	A	A	1R	0 / 11	2–11	67%
French Open	A	A	A	A	A	A	A	A	A	A	A	A	A	A	A	0 / 0	0–0	–
Wimbledon	A	A	A	A	Q3	A	A	A	A	A	A	A	A	A	A	0 / 0	0–0	–
US Open	A	A	A	1R	A	A	A	A	A	A	A	A	A	A	A	0 / 1	0–1	0%
Win–loss	0–1	0–1	0–1	1–2	0–1	1–1	0–1	0–1	0–1	0–0	0–1	0–0	0–0	0–0	0–1	0 / 12	2–12	14%
ATP World Tour Masters 1000
Rome	A	A	A	A	A	A	A	2R	A	A	A	A	A	A	A	0 / 1	1–1	50%
Hamburg	A	A	A	A	A	A	A	A	A	A	1R	Q1	A	A	A	0 / 1	0–1	0%
Canada	A	2R	A	A	A	A	A	A	A	A	A	A	A	A	A	0 / 1	1–1	50%
Win–loss	0–0	1–1	0–0	0–0	0–0	0–0	0–0	1–1	0–0	0–0	0–1	0–0	0–0	0–0	0–0	0 / 3	2–3	40%
