= 1996 Grolsch Open =

- Date: 29 July – 4 August
- Edition: 39th
- Category: World Series
- Draw: 32S / 16D
- Prize money: $475,000
- Surface: Clay / outdoor
- Location: Amsterdam, Netherlands

Champions

Singles
- (Spain) Francisco Clavet

Doubles
- (United States) Donald Johnson / (United States) Francisco Montana
- Dutch Open

The 1996 Grolsch Open, also known as the Dutch Open, was a men's tennis tournament played on outdoor clay courts in Amsterdam, Netherlands and was part of the World Series of the 1996 ATP Tour. It was the 39th edition of the tournament and was held from 29 July until 4 August 1996. Sixth-seeded Francisco Clavet won the singles title, his second at the event after 1990.

== Finals ==
=== Singles ===
(Spain) Francisco Clavet defeated (Morocco) Younes El Aynaoui 7–5, 6–1, 6–1

- It was Clavet's only singles title of the year and the 3rd of his career.

=== Doubles ===
(United States) Donald Johnson / (United States) Francisco Montana defeated (Sweden) Rikard Bergh / (United States) Jack Waite 6–4, 3–6, 6–2

- It was Johnson's 2nd title of the year and the 2nd of his career. It was Montana's 2nd title of the year and the 5th of his career.
