= Mariano Zabaleta =

Argentine tennis player

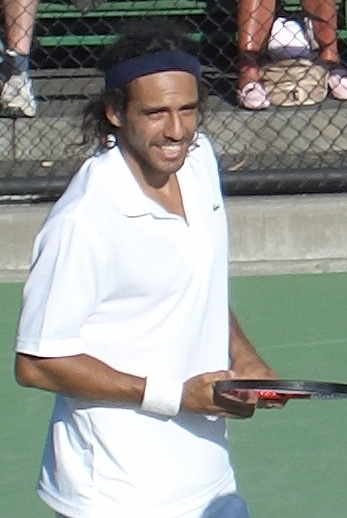
- Country (sports): Argentina
- Residence: Tandil, Argentina
- Born: 28 February 1978 (age 47); Tandil, Argentina
- Height: 1.82 m (5 ft 11 1/2 in)
- Turned pro: 1996
- Retired: 2010
- Plays: Right-handed (double-handed backhand)
- Prize money: US$3,204,127

Singles
- Career record: 202–213
- Career titles: 3
- Highest ranking: No. 21 (3 April 2000)

Grand Slam singles results
- Australian Open: 3R (2000)
- French Open: 4R (2002, 2003)
- Wimbledon: 1R (2000, 2001, 2002, 2003, 2007)
- US Open: QF (2001)

Other tournaments
- Olympic Games: 3R (2000)

Doubles
- Career record: 12–35
- Career titles: 0
- Highest ranking: No. 174 (7 July 2003)

Grand Slam doubles results
- Australian Open: 1R (2003, 2005, 2006)
- French Open: 1R (2003, 2007)
- Wimbledon: 2R (2003)
- US Open: 1R (2004, 2005)

Other doubles tournaments
- Olympic Games: 1R (2000, 2004)
- Last updated on: 14 January 2022.

Mariano Zabaleta (born 28 February 1978) is a retired professional male tennis player from Argentina. He had an unusual but effective service motion. His best shot was his forehand and his favourite surface was clay. Zabaleta's career highlights include reaching the quarter-finals of the 2001 US Open and the final of the 1999 Hamburg Masters. He achieved a career-high singles ranking of World No. 21.

== Tennis career ==
=== Juniors ===
Zabaleta was an outstanding junior in 1995 and finished the year as No. 1 with a junior career singles record of 84–7 (also reaching as high as No. 10 in doubles), with his only loss in 1995 being to Peter Wessels in the quarter-finals of the US Open.

Zabaleta won three of the major junior events in 1995. The Italian Open juniors without losing a set against Martin Lee in the final 6–4, 6–2 and followed that up with French Open juniors which was also achieved without dropping a set and he defeated compatriot Mariano Puerta 6–2, 6–3 as he had done four times in 1995 and not losing a set in the process. Zabaleta finished his junior career with victory in the Orange Bowl over Tommy Haas 6–2, 3–6, 6–1 and that was the only set he dropped in the tournament.

=== Pro tour ===
Zabaleta struggled initially with the transition from juniors to seniors. In 1996 he won his first Challenger event in Birmingham, Alabama over Bill Behrens 6–4, 6–4 and his quarter final performance in Bournemouth was his best showing on the main tour.

In 1997, he made the final of the Guayaquil Challenger losing to Tomas Nydahl. In 1998 Zabaleta reached the third round of the French Open as a qualifier and defeated the number 2 player in the world and reigning Australian Open champion Petr Korda 6–0, 6–2, 3–6, 4–6, 6–3 before losing to Hicham Arazi. Later in the year Zabaleta made his first semifinal in Amsterdam losing to Magnus Norman and then in November he won his first ATP title as a senior at Bogotá defeating Ramón Delgado 6–4, 6–4 in the final.

In 1999, Zabaleta was a finalist on three occasions without winning a title, his best performance was reaching the final of the Hamburg Masters against Marcelo Ríos. Zabaleta had matchpoint in the fourth set and lost the set in the tiebreak and lost the match 7–6^{(5)}, 5–7, 7–5, 6–7^{(5)}, 2–6. Zabaleta lost to Rios again in St Pölten and in Amsterdam to Younes El Aynaoui.

Zabaleta reached the third round of the 2000 Australian Open his best ever showing at the event before losing to Andre Agassi, but he was involved in an Americas Zone Group Davis Cup tie with rivals Chile in Santiago when Zabaleta was leading 7–5, 2–6, 7–6^{(1)} 3–1, when sections of the Chilean crowd incensed by what was perceived to be bad calls against Nicolás Massú threw missiles, fruits, coins, bottles, plastic chairs among other things. Zabaleta's father was hurt in the disturbances and required 10 stitches and the Argentines did not complete the tie after they were escorted from the court by police. Zabaleta reached the third round of the Olympics in Sydney defeating Marcelo Ríos and Jeff Tarango before losing to Max Mirnyi.

While there were no titles in 2001 and 2002 for Zabaleta, he achieved his best ever Grand Slam performance surprisingly at the US Open where he made the quarter-finals on a fast hardcourt, whereas most of success has come on the clay. He defeated Sébastien Grosjean who was in the top 10 at the time, in the first round, then Taylor Dent, Greg Rusedski and Xavier Malisse were beaten before Marat Safin ended his run. He also reached the fourth round of the 2002 French Open defeating top 10 player Yevgeny Kafelnikov and falling to Àlex Corretja.

2003 was Zabaleta's best year overall with a 33–25 record and for the first time a positive record on both hardcourt 12–11 and on clay 20–11. He made the semis in Auckland and Scottsdale losing to Gustavo Kuerten and Mark Philippoussis respectively, he made first his final since 1999 at Acapulco in the process avenging the defeat in Auckland by Gustavo Kuerten in the semi-finals before losing to Agustín Calleri.

Zabaleta matched his fourth round showing from the previous year at the French Open losing to Guillermo Coria in a match that lasted over 4 hours and 41 minutes and went to 5 sets. Then Zabaleta won his second title in Båstad defeating Nicolás Lapentti 6–3, 6–4. At the after match presentation the organisers played a recording of the ABBA song "Money, Money, Money" that Zabaleta made with Younes El Aynaoui which the crowd enjoyed and had a good laugh about. Zabaleta followed up with a semi final in Kitzbühel losing to reigning French Open champion Juan Carlos Ferrero.

In 2004, Zabaleta had defended his title in Båstad against childhood friend and French Open champion Gastón Gaudio 6–1, 4–6, 7–6^{(4)}. He made the semi-finals of the Italian Open defeating Tim Henman and Nicolás Massú who were both in the top 15 at the time, before losing to Carlos Moyà. He also had quarter final appearances in Viña del Mar, Buenos Aires and Kitzbühel.

Zabaleta started 2005 with quarter final appearances in Viña del Mar losing to Fernando González. After pushing the world number 1 Roger Federer to 3 sets in Miami Masters. In the third round of the Monte Carlo Masters, Zabaleta was leading David Ferrer by a set and had to be carried off the court with a foot injury which kept him out for two months and he missed the French Open in the process. He came back to play in Båstad and lost in the quarter-finals to Tomáš Berdych and made the semi-finals in Kitzbühel and after a series of poor results, then he had surgery on his knee.

Zabaleta continued to suffer knee problems in 2006 and finished outside the top 100 for the first time since 1997. He started 2007 by winning the La Serena Challenger defeating Juan-Pablo Brzezicki and was a finalist in Florianópolis losing to Óscar Hernández. After qualifying for the U.S. Men's Clay Court Championships, Zabaleta reached the final without losing a set and in the process defeated both finalists from 2006 Mardy Fish and Jürgen Melzer before losing to Croat Ivo Karlović. Zabaleta won the Bermuda Challenger and with this victory took him back inside the top 100 in the ATP rankings.

In 2008, Zabaleta suffered very poor results, which led to him dropping beyond top 1000. In March 2009, he lost the 2009 Challenger de Providencia final in Santiago de Chile against countryman Máximo González.

After playing on the Challenger circuit in 2009, Zabaleta retired from tennis in 2010 and is now taking part on a TV show on ESPN

== Personal and miscellaneous ==
In 2004 he started his own show called Tenis Pro in which he takes the video camera with him to all the tournaments and highlights life on tour in a light hearted manner and along with Juan Ignacio Chela conduct various interviews with other players, along with other various skits.

Zabaleta has no relation to the former West Ham United and Manchester City footballer Pablo Zabaleta, although the latter was interviewed by the former for a football website.

== Junior Grand Slam finals ==
=== Singles: 1 (1 title) ===
Result	Year	Tournament	Surface	Opponent	Score
Win	1995	French Open	Clay	(Argentina) Mariano Puerta	6–2, 6–3

== ATP career finals ==
=== Singles: 8 (3 titles, 5 runner-ups) ===
Legend Grand Slam Tournaments (0–0) ATP World Tour Finals (0–0) ATP World Tour Masters Series (0–1) ATP Championship Series (0–1) ATP World Series (3–3)	Finals by surface Hard (0–0) Clay (3–5) Grass (0–0) Carpet (0–0)	Finals by setting Outdoors (3–5) Indoors (0–0)

Result	W–L	Date	Tournament	Tier	Surface	Opponent	Score
Win	1–0	Nov 1998	Bogotá, Colombia	International Series	Clay	(Paraguay) Ramón Delgado	6–4, 6–4
Loss	1–1	May 1999	Hamburg, Germany	Masters Series	Clay	(Chile) Marcelo Ríos	7–6^{(7–5)}, 5–7, 7–5, 6–7^{(5–7)}, 2–6
Loss	1–2	May 1999	St Pölten, Austria	International Series	Clay	(Chile) Marcelo Ríos	4–4 ret.
Loss	1–3	Aug 1999	Amsterdam, Netherlands	World Series	Clay	(Morocco) Younes El Aynaoui	0–6, 3–6
Loss	1–4	Feb 2003	Acapulco, Mexico	Championship Series	Clay	(Argentina) Agustín Calleri	5–7, 6–3, 3–6
Win	2–4	Jul 2003	Båstad, Sweden	International Series	Clay	(Ecuador) Nicolás Lapentti	6–3, 6–4
Win	3–4	Jul 2004	Båstad, Sweden	International Series	Clay	(Argentina) Gastón Gaudio	6–1, 4–6, 7–6^{(7–4)}
Loss	3–5	Apr 2007	Houston, United States	International Series	Clay	(Croatia) Ivo Karlović	4–6, 1–6

== ATP Challenger and ITF Futures finals ==
=== Singles: 7 (3–4) ===
Legend ATP Challenger (3–4) ITF Futures (0–0)	Finals by surface Hard (0–0) Clay (3–4) Grass (0–0) Carpet (0–0)

Result	W–L	Date	Tournament	Tier	Surface	Opponent	Score
Win	1–0	Apr 1996	Birmingham, United States	Challenger	Clay	(United States) Bill Behrens	6–4, 6–4
Loss	1–1	Oct 1997	Guayaquil, Ecuador	Challenger	Clay	(Sweden) Tomas Nydahl	0–6, 3–6
Loss	1–2	Nov 2006	Guayaquil, Ecuador	Challenger	Clay	(Argentina) Sergio Roitman	3–6, 6–4, 1–6
Win	2–2	Jan 2007	La Serena, Chile	Challenger	Clay	(Argentina) Juan-Pablo Brzezicki	6–2, 6–4
Loss	2–3	Feb 2007	Florianopolis, Brazil	Challenger	Clay	(Spain) Óscar Hernández	5–7, 6–7^{(6–8)}
Win	3–3	Apr 2007	Paget, Bermuda	Challenger	Clay	(Canada) Frank Dancevic	7–5, 5–7, 6–3
Loss	3–4	Mar 2009	Santiago, Chile	Challenger	Clay	(Argentina) Máximo González	4–6, 3–6

== Performance Timelines ==
Key
W	F	SF	QF	#R	RR	Q#	P#	DNQ	A	Z#	PO	G	S	B	NMS	NTI	P	NH

(W) winner; (F) finalist; (SF) semifinalist; (QF) quarterfinalist; (#R) rounds 4, 3, 2, 1; (RR) round-robin stage; (Q#) qualification round; (P#) preliminary round; (DNQ) did not qualify; (A) absent; (Z#) Davis/Fed Cup Zonal Group (with number indication) or (PO) play-off; (G) gold, (S) silver or (B) bronze Olympic/Paralympic medal; (NMS) not a Masters tournament; (NTI) not a Tier I tournament; (P) postponed; (NH) not held; (SR) strike rate (events won / competed); (W–L) win–loss record.

=== Singles ===
Tournament	1996	1997	1998	1999	2000	2001	2002	2003	2004	2005	2006	2007	2008	2009	SR	W–L
Grand Slam tournaments
Australian Open	A	A	A	2R	3R	2R	1R	1R	A	2R	1R	A	1R	A	0 / 8	5–8
French Open	Q2	1R	3R	1R	2R	1R	4R	4R	2R	A	Q2	2R	A	Q1	0 / 9	11–9
Wimbledon	A	A	A	A	1R	1R	1R	1R	A	A	A	1R	A	A	0 / 5	0–5
US Open	A	A	A	1R	A	QF	1R	1R	1R	1R	1R	1R	A	A	0 / 8	4–8
Win–loss	0–0	0–1	2–1	1–3	3–3	5–4	3–4	3–4	1–2	1–2	0–2	1–3	0–1	0–0	0 / 30	20–30
ATP Masters Series
Indian Wells	A	1R	A	1R	3R	A	1R	2R	1R	1R	A	A	A	A	0 / 7	3–7
Miami	A	1R	A	1R	3R	1R	1R	1R	2R	3R	A	A	A	A	0 / 8	4–8
Monte Carlo	A	A	A	1R	2R	Q1	1R	1R	1R	3R	A	A	A	A	0 / 6	3–6
Hamburg	A	A	A	F	QF	Q2	3R	3R	2R	A	A	Q1	A	NM1	0 / 5	13–5
Rome	1R	Q1	A	1R	2R	Q2	A	2R	SF	A	A	A	A	A	0 / 5	6–5
Canada	A	A	A	A	1R	A	2R	2R	1R	A	A	A	A	A	0 / 4	2–4
Cincinnati	A	A	A	A	1R	A	1R	QF	2R	A	A	A	A	A	0 / 4	4–4
Madrid^{1}	A	A	A	QF	A	A	1R	1R	Q1	A	A	A	A	A	0 / 3	3–3
Paris	A	A	A	1R	A	A	1R	1R	1R	A	A	A	A	A	0 / 4	0–4
Win–loss	0–1	0–2	0–0	8–7	8–7	0–1	3–8	8–9	7–8	4–3	0–0	0–0	0–0	0–0	0 / 46	38–46
Year-end ranking	103	257	63	28	61	59	53	27	54	83	243	104	1141	292		

^{1}This event was held in Stuttgart from 1996 through 2001.

=== Doubles ===
Tournament	1996	1997	1998	1999	2000	2001	2002	2003	2004	2005	2006	2007	SR	W–L	Win %
Grand Slam tournaments
Australian Open	A	A	A	A	A	A	A	1R	A	1R	1R	A	0 / 3	0–3	0%
French Open	A	A	A	A	A	A	A	1R	A	A	A	1R	0 / 2	0–2	0%
Wimbledon	A	A	A	A	A	A	A	2R	A	A	A	A	0 / 1	1–1	50%
US Open	A	A	A	A	A	A	A	A	1R	1R	A	A	0 / 2	0–2	0%
Win–loss	0–0	0–0	0–0	0–0	0–0	0–0	0–0	1–3	0–1	0–2	0–1	0–1	0 / 8	1–8	11%
Olympic Games
Summer Olympics	A	Not Held			1R	Not Held			1R	Not Held			0 / 2	0–2	0%
ATP Masters Series
Rome	Q2	A	A	A	A	A	A	A	A	A	A	A	0 / 0	0–0	–
Canada	A	A	A	A	A	A	A	1R	A	A	A	A	0 / 1	0–1	0%
Win–loss	0–0	0–0	0–0	0–0	0–0	0–0	0–0	0–1	0–0	0–0	0–0	0–0	0 / 1	0–1	0%
