= 1998 ATP Super 9 =

Men's professional tennis tour

Details
- Duration: March 5 – November 9
- Edition: 9th
- Tournaments: 9

Achievements (singles)
- Most titles: (Chile) Marcelo Ríos (3)
- Most finals: (Chile) Marcelo Ríos (3)

The 1998 ATP Super 9 (also known as Mercedes-Benz Super 9 for sponsorship reasons) were part of the 1998 ATP Tour, the elite tour for professional men's tennis organised by the Association of Tennis Professionals.

== Results ==
* First-time champion

Masters	Singles champions	Runners-up	Score	Doubles champions	Runners-up	Score
Indian Wells Singles – Doubles	(Chile) Marcelo Ríos	(United Kingdom) Greg Rusedski	6–3, 6–7^{(15–17)}, 7–6^{(7–4)}, 6–4	(Sweden) Jonas Björkman*	(United States) Todd Martin (United States) Richey Reneberg	6–0, 6–3
Indian Wells Singles – Doubles	(Chile) Marcelo Ríos	(United Kingdom) Greg Rusedski	6–3, 6–7^{(15–17)}, 7–6^{(7–4)}, 6–4	(Australia) Patrick Rafter	(United States) Todd Martin (United States) Richey Reneberg	6–0, 6–3
Miami Singles – Doubles	(Chile) Marcelo Ríos	(United States) Andre Agassi	7–5, 6–3, 6–4	(South Africa) Ellis Ferreira (United States) Rick Leach	(United States) Alex O'Brien (United States) Jonathan Stark	6–2, 6–4
Monte Carlo Singles – Doubles	(Spain) Carlos Moyà*	(France) Cédric Pioline	6–3, 6–0, 7–5	(Netherlands) Jacco Eltingh (Netherlands) Paul Haarhuis	(Australia) Todd Woodbridge (Australia) Mark Woodforde	6–4, 6–2
Hamburg Singles – Doubles	(Spain) Albert Costa*	(Spain) Àlex Corretja	6–2, 6–0, 1–0 ret.	(United States) Donald Johnson (United States) Francisco Montana	(South Africa) David Adams (New Zealand) Brett Steven	6–4, 6–4
Rome Singles – Doubles	(Chile) Marcelo Ríos	(Spain) Albert Costa	W/O	(India) Mahesh Bhupathi (India) Leander Paes	(South Africa) Ellis Ferreira (United States) Rick Leach	6–4, 4–6, 7–6
Toronto Singles – Doubles	(Australia) Patrick Rafter*	(Netherlands) Richard Krajicek	7–6^{(7–3)}, 6–4	(Czech Republic) Martin Damm*	(South Africa) Ellis Ferreira (United States) Rick Leach	6–7, 6–2 7–6
Toronto Singles – Doubles	(Australia) Patrick Rafter*	(Netherlands) Richard Krajicek	7–6^{(7–3)}, 6–4	(United States) Jim Grabb	(South Africa) Ellis Ferreira (United States) Rick Leach	6–7, 6–2 7–6
Cincinnati Singles – Doubles	(Australia) Patrick Rafter	(United States) Pete Sampras	1–6, 7–6^{(7–2)}, 6–4	(The Bahamas) Mark Knowles (Canada) Daniel Nestor	(France) Olivier Delaître (France) Fabrice Santoro	6–7, 6–4, 6–4
Stuttgart Singles – Doubles	(Netherlands) Richard Krajicek*	(Russia) Yevgeny Kafelnikov	6–4, 6–3, 6–3	(Canada) Sébastien Lareau (United States) Alex O'Brien	(India) Mahesh Bhupathi (India) Leander Paes	4–6, 6–3, 7–5
Paris Singles – Doubles	(United Kingdom) Greg Rusedski*	(United States) Pete Sampras	6–4, 7–6^{(7–4)}, 6–3	(India) Mahesh Bhupathi (India) Leander Paes	(Netherlands) Jacco Eltingh (Netherlands) Paul Haarhuis	7–6, 7–6

== Champions ==
=== Singles ===
#	Player	IN	MI	MO	HA	RO	CA	CI	ST	PA	#	Winning span
	(United States) Andre Agassi	-	3	-	-	-	3	2	-	1	9	1990–1996 (7)
	(United States) Pete Sampras	2	2	-	-	1	-	2	-	2	9	1992–1997 (6)
	(Austria) Thomas Muster	-	1	3	-	3	-	-	1	-	8	1990–1997 (8)
	(United States) Michael Chang	3	1	-	-	-	1	2	-	-	7	1990–1997 (8)
	(United States) Jim Courier	2	1	-	-	2	-	-	-	-	5	1991–1993 (3)
	(Germany) Boris Becker	-	-	-	-	-	-	-	4	1	5	1990–1996 (7)
	(Sweden) Stefan Edberg	1	-	-	1	-	-	1	-	1	4	1990–1992 (3)
	(Ukraine) Andrei Medvedev	-	-	1	3	-	-	-	-	-	4	1994–1997 (4)
	(Chile) Marcelo Ríos	1	1	1	-	1	-	-	-	-	4	1997–1998 (2)
	(Spain) Sergi Bruguera	-	-	2	-	-	-	-	-	-	2	1991–1993 (3)
	(Russia) Andrei Chesnokov	-	-	1	-	-	1	-	-	-	2	1990–1991 (2)
	(France) Guy Forget	-	-	-	-	-	-	1	-	1	2	1991
	(Croatia) Goran Ivanišević	-	-	-	-	-	-	-	1	1	2	1992–1993 (2)
	(Australia) Patrick Rafter	-	-	-	-	-	1	1	-	-	2	1998
	(Germany) Michael Stich	-	-	-	1	-	-	-	1	-	2	1993
	(Spain) Juan Aguilera	-	-	-	1	-	-	-	-	-	1	1990
	(Spain) Àlex Corretja	-	-	-	-	1	-	-	-	-	1	1997
	(Spain) Albert Costa	-	-	-	1	-	-	-	-	-	1	1998
	(Spain) Roberto Carretero	-	-	-	1	-	-	-	-	-	1	1996
	(Sweden) Thomas Enqvist	-	-	-	-	-	-	-	-	1	1	1996
	(South Africa) Wayne Ferreira	-	-	-	-	-	1	-	-	-	1	1996
	(Czech Republic) Petr Korda	-	-	-	-	-	-	-	1	-	1	1997
	(Netherlands) Richard Krajicek	-	-	-	-	-	-	-	1	-	1	1998
	(Spain) Carlos Moyá	-	-	1	-	-	1	-	-	-	1	1998
	(Czech Republic) Karel Nováček	-	-	-	1	-	-	-	-	-	1	1991
	(Sweden) Mikael Pernfors	-	-	-	-	-	1	-	-	-	1	1993
	(United Kingdom) Greg Rusedski	-	-	-	-	-	-	-	-	1	1	1998
	(Spain) Emilio Sánchez	-	-	-	-	1	-	-	-	-	1	1991
	(United States) Chris Woodruff	-	-	-	-	-	1	-	-	-	1	1997
#	Player	IN	MI	MO	HA	RO	CA	CI	ST	PA	#	Winning span

== See also ==
- ATP Tour Masters 1000
- 1998 ATP Tour
- 1998 WTA Tier I Series
- 1998 WTA Tour
