= 1998 WTA Tier I Series =

Women's professional tennis tour

Details
- Duration: February 2 – October 25
- Edition: 9th
- Tournaments: 8

Achievements (singles)
- Most titles: (United States) Lindsay Davenport (Switzerland) Martina Hingis (2)
- Most finals: (United States) Lindsay Davenport (Switzerland) Martina Hingis (United States) Venus Williams (3)

The WTA Tier I events are part of the elite tour for professional women's tennis organised by the WTA called the WTA Tour.

== Tournaments ==
Tournament	Country	Location	Surface	Date	Prize money
Toray Pan Pacific Open	Japan	Tokyo	Carpet (i)	Feb 2 – 8	$926,250
State Farm Evert Cup	United States	Indian Wells	Hard	Mar 2 – 15	$1,250,000
Lipton Championships	United States	Key Biscayne	Hard	Mar 16 – 29	$1,900,000
Family Circle Magazine Cup	United States	Hilton Head Island	Clay (green)	Mar 30 – Apr 5	$926,250
Campionati Internazionali d’Italia	Italy	Rome	Clay (red)	May 4 – 10	$926,250
German Open	Germany	Berlin	Clay (red)	May 11 – 17	$926,250
du Maurier Open	Canada	Montreal	Hard	Aug 17 – 23	$926,250
European Championships	Switzerland	Zürich	Carpet (i)	Oct 12 – 18	$926,250
MGTS Kremlin Cup	Russia	Moscow	Carpet (i)	Oct 19 – 25	$1,000,000

== Results ==
* First-time champion

Tournament	Singles champions	Runners-up	Score	Doubles champions	Runners-up	Score
Tokyo Singles – Doubles	(United States) Lindsay Davenport	(Switzerland) Martina Hingis	6–3, 6–3	(Switzerland) Martina Hingis	(United States) Lindsay Davenport (Belarus) Natasha Zvereva	7–5, 6–4
Tokyo Singles – Doubles	(United States) Lindsay Davenport	(Switzerland) Martina Hingis	6–3, 6–3	(Croatia) Mirjana Lučić*	(United States) Lindsay Davenport (Belarus) Natasha Zvereva	7–5, 6–4
Indian Wells Singles – Doubles	(Switzerland) Martina Hingis	(United States) Lindsay Davenport	6–3, 6–4	(United States) Lindsay Davenport (Belarus) Natasha Zvereva	(France) Alexandra Fusai (France) Nathalie Tauziat	6–4, 2–6, 6–4
Miami Singles – Doubles	(United States) Venus Williams*	(Russia) Anna Kournikova	2–6, 6–4, 6–1	(Switzerland) Martina Hingis (Czech Republic) Jana Novotná	(Spain) Arantxa Sánchez Vicario (Belarus) Natasha Zvereva	6–2, 3–6, 6–3
Hilton Head Singles – Doubles	(South Africa) Amanda Coetzer*	(Romania) Irina Spîrlea	6–3, 6–4	(Spain) Conchita Martínez* (Argentina) Patricia Tarabini*	(United States) Lisa Raymond (Australia) Rennae Stubbs	3–6, 6–4, 6–4
Rome Singles – Doubles	(Switzerland) Martina Hingis	(United States) Venus Williams	6–3, 2–6, 6–3	(Spain) Virginia Ruano Pascual* (Argentina) Paola Suárez*	(South Africa) Amanda Coetzer (Spain) Arantxa Sánchez Vicario	7–6^{(7–1)}, 6–4
Berlin Singles – Doubles	(Spain) Conchita Martínez	(France) Amélie Mauresmo	6–4, 6–4	(United States) Lindsay Davenport (Belarus) Natasha Zvereva	(France) Alexandra Fusai (France) Nathalie Tauziat	6–3, 6–0
Montréal Singles – Doubles	(United States) Monica Seles	(Spain) Arantxa Sánchez Vicario	6–3, 6–2	(Switzerland) Martina Hingis (Czech Republic) Jana Novotná	(Indonesia) Yayuk Basuki (Netherlands) Caroline Vis	6–3, 6–4
Zürich Singles – Doubles	(United States) Lindsay Davenport	(United States) Venus Williams	6–3, 6–4	(United States) Serena Williams* (United States) Venus Williams*	(South Africa) Mariaan de Swardt (Ukraine) Elena Tatarkova	5–7, 6–1, 6–3
Moscow Singles – Doubles	(France) Mary Pierce	(United States) Monica Seles	7–6^{(7–2)}, 6–3	(France) Mary Pierce*	(United States) Lisa Raymond (Australia) Rennae Stubbs	6–3, 6–4
Moscow Singles – Doubles	(France) Mary Pierce	(United States) Monica Seles	7–6^{(7–2)}, 6–3	(Belarus) Natasha Zvereva	(United States) Lisa Raymond (Australia) Rennae Stubbs	6–3, 6–4

== See also ==
- WTA Tier I events
- 1998 WTA Tour
- 1998 ATP Super 9
- 1998 ATP Tour
