= 1998 du Maurier Open – Women's doubles =

Women's doubles
- 1998 du Maurier Open
- 1997 Champions: (Indonesia) Yayuk Basuki (Netherlands) Caroline Vis

Final
- Champions: (Switzerland) Martina Hingis (Czech Republic) Jana Novotná
- Runners-up: (Indonesia) Yayuk Basuki (Netherlands) Caroline Vis
- Score: 6–3, 6–4

Details
- Draw: 28
- Seeds: 8

Events
Singles	men	women
Doubles	men	women
- du Maurier Open

The 1998 du Maurier Open women's doubles was the women's doubles event of the one hundred and ninth edition of the Canadian Open; a WTA Tier I tournament and the most prestigious women's tennis tournament held in Canada. Yayuk Basuki and Caroline Vis were the defending champions but lost in the final 6–3, 6–4 against Martina Hingis and Jana Novotná.

== Seeds ==
Champion seeds are indicated in bold text while text in italics indicates the round in which those seeds were eliminated. The top four seeded teams received byes into the second round.

1. (Switzerland) **Martina Hingis** / (Czech Republic) **Jana Novotná (champions)**
2. (France) Alexandra Fusai / (France) Nathalie Tauziat (semifinals)
3. (United States) Lisa Raymond / (Australia) Rennae Stubbs (second round)
4. (Indonesia) Yayuk Basuki / (Netherlands) Caroline Vis (final)
5. (Russia) Anna Kournikova / (Latvia) Larisa Neiland (first round)
6. (Spain) Conchita Martínez / (Argentina) Patricia Tarabini (semifinals)
7. (Russia) Elena Likhovtseva / (Japan) Ai Sugiyama (second round)
8. (Japan) Naoko Kijimuta / (Japan) Nana Miyagi (quarterfinals)

== Draw ==
Key

- Q = Qualifier
- WC = Wild card
- LL = Lucky loser
- Alt = Alternate
- ITF = ITF entry
- PR = Protected ranking
- SR = Special ranking
- SE = Special exempt
- JE = Junior exempt
- JR = Junior Accelerator Programme entrant
- CO = College Accelerator Programme entrant
- NG = Next Gen Accelerator Program entrant
- w/o = Walkover
- r = Retired
- d = Defaulted

=== Final ===
Final

1
- (Switzerland) **Martina Hingis**
- (Czech Republic) **Jana Novotná**
**6**
**6**

4
- (Indonesia) Yayuk Basuki
- (Netherlands) Caroline Vis
3
4

=== Top half ===
First round

Second round

Quarterfinals

Semifinals

1
- (Switzerland) **M Hingis**
- (Czech Republic) **J Novotná**
**6**
**6**

- (Romania) C Cristea
- (Australia) K-A Guse
3
**6**
4

- (United States) A Frazier
- (France) A-G Sidot
2
3

- (United States) **A Frazier**
- (France) **A-G Sidot**
**6**
3
**6**

1
- (Switzerland) **M Hingis**
- (Czech Republic) **J Novotná**
**6**
**6**

- (France) J Halard-Decugis
- (Australia) R McQuillan
2
5

8
- (Japan) N Kijimuta
- (Japan) N Miyagi
2
3

WC
- (Argentina) **I Gorrochategui**
- (Germany) **S Graf**
**6**
**7**

WC
- (Argentina) I Gorrochategui
- (Germany) S Graf
4
5

- (Australia) L McShea
- (Australia) N Pratt
3
**6**
4

8
- (Japan) **N Kijimuta**
- (Japan) **N Miyagi**
**6**
**7**

8
- (Japan) **N Kijimuta**
- (Japan) **N Miyagi**
**6**
4
**6**

1
- (Switzerland) **M Hingis**
- (Czech Republic) **J Novotná**
**6**
4
**6**

6
- (Spain) C Martínez
- (Argentina) P Tarabini
1
**6**
4

3
- (United States) L Raymond
- (Australia) R Stubbs
3
**6**
3

- (Australia) **K Kunce**
- (United States) **C Morariu**
**6**
**6**

- (Australia) **K Kunce**
- (United States) **C Morariu**
**6**
3
**6**

- (Croatia) M Murić
- (Thailand) T Tanasugarn
1
3

- (Australia) K Kunce
- (United States) C Morariu
**6**
5
2

- (United States) **L McNeil**
- (United States) **K Po**
**6**
**6**

6
- (Spain) **C Martínez**
- (Argentina) **P Tarabini**
1
**7**
**6**

WC
- (Canada) S Jeyaseelan
- (Canada) R Simpson
3
1

- (United States) L McNeil
- (United States) K Po
1
2

- (Argentina) F Labat
- (Belgium) D Van Roost
5
5

6
- (Spain) **C Martínez**
- (Argentina) **P Tarabini**
**6**
**6**

6
- (Spain) **C Martínez**
- (Argentina) **P Tarabini**
**7**
**7**

=== Bottom half ===
First round

Second round

Quarterfinals

Semifinals

5
- (Russia) A Kournikova
- (Latvia) L Neiland
6
3

- (Romania) **R Dragomir**
- (Croatia) **I Majoli**
**7**
**6**

- (Romania) R Dragomir
- (Croatia) I Majoli
4
6

- (Austria) B Schett
- (Switzerland) P Schnyder
2
2

- (Italy) **S Farina**
- (Slovakia) **K Habšudová**
**6**
**7**

- (Italy) **S Farina**
- (Slovakia) **K Habšudová**
**6**
**6**

- (Italy) S Farina
- (Slovakia) K Habšudová
**6**
1
2

Q
- (United States) S Cacic
- (Canada) M Drake
2
1

4
- (Indonesia) **Y Basuki**
- (Netherlands) **C Vis**
4
**6**
**6**

- (United States) **M J Fernández**
- (Spain) **A Sánchez-Vicario**
**6**
**6**

- (United States) M J Fernández
- (Spain) A Sánchez-Vicario
3
3

4
- (Indonesia) **Y Basuki**
- (Netherlands) **C Vis**
**6**
**6**

4
- (Indonesia) **Y Basuki**
- (Netherlands) **C Vis**
**6**
**2**

7
- (Russia) **E Likhovtseva**
- (Japan) **A Sugiyama**
**6**
**6**

2
- (France) A Fusai
- (France) N Tauziat
2
1
r

- (Belarus) O Barabanschikova
- (Ukraine) E Tatarkova
4
2

7
- (Russia) E Likhovtseva
- (Japan) A Sugiyama
1
3

- (Italy) **R Grande**
- (France) **S Testud**
**6**
**6**

- (Italy) **R Grande**
- (France) **S Testud**
**6**
**6**

- (Chinese Taipei) J Lee
- (Chinese Taipei) S-T Wang
2
0

- (Italy) R Grande
- (France) S Testud
1
2

- (Germany) B Rittner
- (Spain) V Ruano Pascual
**6**
1
3

2
- (France) **A Fusai**
- (France) **N Tauziat**
**6**
**6**

- (South Africa) **A Coetzer**
- (Germany) **A Huber**
4
**6**
**6**

- (South Africa) A Coetzer
- (Germany) A Huber
5
**6**
3

2
- (France) **A Fusai**
- (France) **N Tauziat**
**7**
4
**6**
