= 1998 du Maurier Open – Men's singles =

Men's singles
- 1998 du Maurier Open

Final
- Champion: (Australia) Patrick Rafter
- Runner-up: (Netherlands) Richard Krajicek
- Score: 7–6^{(7–3)}, 6–4

Details
- Draw: 56 (4WC/7Q/2LL)
- Seeds: 16

Events
Singles	men	women
Doubles	men	women
← 1997 ·	Canadian Open	· 1999 →

Patrick Rafter defeated Richard Krajicek in the final, 7–6,^{(7–3)}, 6–4 to win the men's singles tennis title at the 1998 Canadian Open. Rafter became the first tennis player in 10 years in winning the tournament without dropping a set, after Ivan Lendl did the same achievement in 1988.

Chris Woodruff was the reigning champion, but did not participate this year due to an 8-month injury.

== Seeds ==
A champion seed is indicated in bold text while text in italics indicates the round in which that seed was eliminated. The top eight seeds received a bye to the second round.

1. (United States) Pete Sampras (quarterfinals)
2. (Czech Republic) Petr Korda (second round)
3. (Australia) **Patrick Rafter (champion)**
4. (Russia) Yevgeny Kafelnikov (quarterfinals)
5. (Sweden) Jonas Björkman (quarterfinals)
6. (Netherlands) Richard Krajicek (final)
7. (United Kingdom) Tim Henman (semifinals)
8. (United States) Andre Agassi (semifinals)
9. (Spain) Álbert Costa (third round)
10. (Croatia) Goran Ivanišević (third round)
11. (Sweden) ~~Thomas Enqvist~~ (withdrew)
12. (Brazil) Gustavo Kuerten (first round)
13. (Netherlands) Jan Siemerink (first round)
14. (Australia) Mark Philippoussis (third round)
15. (France) Fabrice Santoro (second round)
16. (South Africa) Wayne Ferreira (first round, retired)
17. (Germany) Nicolas Kiefer (third round)

== Draw ==
=== Key ===
- Q = Qualifier
- WC = Wild card
- LL = Lucky loser
- Alt = Alternate
- SE = Special exempt
- PR = Protected ranking
- ITF = ITF entry
- JE = Junior exempt
- w/o = Walkover
- r = Retired
- d = Defaulted
- SR = Special ranking

=== Finals ===
Semifinals
8/WC	(United States) Andre Agassi	**6**	5	2
6	(Netherlands) **Richard Krajicek**	4	**7**	**6**
3	(Australia) **Patrick Rafter**	**6**	**6**
7	(United Kingdom) Tim Henman	2	4

Final
6	(Netherlands) Richard Krajicek	6^{3}	4
3	(Australia) **Patrick Rafter**	**7^{7}**	**6**

=== Top half ===
==== Section 1 ====
First round
(United States) J Tarango	6^{2}	**6**	2
(Italy) **G Pozzi**	**7^{7}**	4	**6**
(South Africa) M Ondruska	2	3
(Germany) **T Haas**	**6**	**6**
(Czech Republic) M Damm	3	4
15	(France) **F Santoro**	**6**	**6**
10	(Croatia) **G Ivanišević**	**7^{14}**	**7^{7}**
WC	(Canada) S Lareau	6^{12}	6^{4}
(France) A Clément	**6**	4	5
(Armenia) **S Sargsian**	3	**6**	**7**
LL	(Finland) T Ketola	5	3
(France) **G Raoux**	**7**	**6**

Second round
1	(United States) **P Sampras**	**6**	**6**
(Italy) G Pozzi	1	2
(Germany) **T Haas**	**7^{10}**	**6**
15	(France) F Santoro	6^{8}	2
10	(Croatia) **G Ivanišević**	**6**	**6**
(Armenia) S Sargsian	3	2
(France) G Raoux	4	5
8/WC	(United States) **A Agassi**	**6**	**7**

Third round
1	(United States) **P Sampras**	**7^{7}**	**6**
(Germany) T Haas	6^{5}	2
10	(Croatia) G Ivanišević	**6**	5	3
8/WC	(United States) **A Agassi**	2	**7**	**6**

Quarterfinals
1	(United States) P Sampras	**7^{7}**	1	2
8/WC	(United States) **A Agassi**	6^{5}	**6**	**6**

==== Section 2 ====
First round
Q	(United States) M Russell	3	4
(United States) **T Martin**	**6**	**6**
WC	(Canada) **B Kokavec**	**6**	**6**
(United States) S Campbell	1	2
(United States) **M Washington**	**7^{7}**	**6**
13	(Netherlands) J Siemerink	6^{2}	3
12	(Brazil) G Kuerten	3	6^{2}
LL	(United States) **A O'Brien**	**6**	**7^{7}**
(Paraguay) **R Delgado**	**7^{7}**	6^{2}	**6**
Q	(United States) B MacPhie	6^{4}	**7^{7}**	1
Q	(Italy) L Tieleman	1	**6**	5
(South Africa) **D Nainkin**	**6**	3	**7**

Second round
4	(Russia) **Y Kafelnikov**	**6**	**6**
(United States) T Martin	2	3
WC	(Canada) B Kokavec	3	4
(United States) **M Washington**	**6**	**6**
LL	(United States) **A O'Brien**	**6**	4	**7**
(Paraguay) R Delgado	1	**6**	5
Q	(South Africa) D Nainkin	4	4
6	(Netherlands) **R Krajicek**	**6**	**6**

Third round
4	(Russia) **Y Kafelnikov**	**7^{8}**	**6**
(United States) M Washington	6^{6}	2
LL	(United States) A O'Brien	**6**	2	3
6	(Netherlands) **R Krajicek**	3	**6**	**6**

Quarterfinals
4	(Russia) Y Kafelnikov	4	4
6	(Netherlands) **R Krajicek**	**6**	**6**

=== Bottom half ===
==== Section 3 ====
First round
(United States) J Courier	5	**7**	4
(Australia) **S Draper**	**7**	5	**6**
WC	(Canada) F Niemeyer	4	4
(Italy) **V Santopadre**	**6**	**6**
(Canada) D Nestor	2	6^{1}
17	(Germany) **N Kiefer**	**6**	**7^{7}**
14	(Australia) **M Philippoussis**	**6**	**6**
Q	(United States) D Flach	4	3
(Zimbabwe) **W Black**	**6**	**6**
(Zimbabwe) B Black	4	0
Q	(Philippines) C Mamiit	4	**6**	4
Q	(South Africa) **N Godwin**	**6**	1	**6**

Second round
5	(Sweden) **J Björkman**	**7^{7}**	**6**
(Australia) S Draper	6^{5}	3
(Italy) V Santopadre	**6**	1	6^{6}
17	(Germany) **N Kiefer**	2	**6**	**7^{8}**
14	(Australia) **M Philippoussis**	**6**	**6**
(Zimbabwe) W Black	1	4
Q	(South Africa) N Godwin	5	3
3	(Australia) **P Rafter**	**7**	**6**

Third round
5	(Sweden) **J Björkman**	**6**	6^{7}	**6**
17	(Germany) N Kiefer	2	**7^{9}**	3
14	(Australia) M Philippoussis	3	3
3	(Australia) **P Rafter**	**6**	**6**

Quarterfinals
5	(Sweden) J Björkman	3	2
3	(Australia) **P Rafter**	**6**	**6**

==== Section 4 ====
First round
(Argentina) **G Cañas**	2	**7^{15}**	**6**
(South Africa) G Stafford	**6**	6^{13}	2
(United States) **J-M Gambill**	**6**	**6**
(France) N Escudé	3	2
(Australia) J Stoltenberg	5	4
9	(Spain) **Á Costa**	**7**	**6**
16	(South Africa) W Ferreira	2	r
(Australia) **M Tebbutt**	**3**
(Netherlands) S Schalken	**6**	3	4
(Czech Republic) **D Vacek**	4	**6**	**6**
(Australia) A Ilie	3	0
(United States) **V Spadea**	**6**	**6**

Second round
7	(United Kingdom) **T Henman**	3	**7^{7}**	**6**
(Argentina) G Cañas	**6**	6^{5}	2
(United States) J-M Gambill	4	2
9	(Spain) **Á Costa**	**6**	**6**
(Australia) M Tebbutt	4	6^{9}
(Czech Republic) **D Vacek**	**6**	**7^{11}**
(United States) **V Spadea**	5	**6**	**6**
2	(Czech Republic) P Korda	**7**	1	4

Third round
7	(United Kingdom) **T Henman**	**7^{7}**	**6**
9	(Spain) Á Costa	6^{2}	2
(Czech Republic) **D Vacek**	4	**6**	**6**
(United States) V Spadea	**6**	1	4

Quarterfinals
7	(United Kingdom) **T Henman**	**6**	5	**6**
(Czech Republic) D Vacek	3	**7**	1

== Qualifying ==
=== Qualifying seeds ===
1. (Italy) **Laurence Tieleman (qualified)**
2. (United States) Alex O'Brien (qualifying competition, retired, **lucky loser**)
3. (United States) **Brian MacPhie (qualified)**
4. (South Africa) **Neville Godwin (qualified)**
5. (Finland) Tuomas Ketola (qualifying competition, **lucky loser**)
6. (Spain) Óscar Burrieza (qualifying competition)
7. (Philippines) **Cecil Mamiit (qualified)**
8. (France) Olivier Delaître (first round)
9. (South Africa) **David Nainkin (qualified)**
10. (United States) **Doug Flach (qualified)**
11. (United States) David Witt (first round)
12. (Belarus) Max Mirnyi (qualifying competition)
13. (United States) **Michael Russell (qualified)**
14. (Haiti) Ronald Agénor (qualifying competition)

=== Qualifiers ===
1. (Italy) **Laurence Tieleman**
2. (United States) **Brian MacPhie**
3. (South Africa) **Neville Godwin**
4. (United States) **Doug Flach**
5. (South Africa) **David Nainkin**
6. (Philippines) **Cecil Mamiit**
7. (United States) **Michael Russell**

=== Lucky losers ===
1. (United States) **Alex O'Brien**
2. (Finland) **Tuomas Ketola**

=== Qualifying draw ===
==== First qualifier ====
First round
1	**(Italy) Laurence Tieleman**	**6**	**6**
WC	(Canada) Rob Steckley	3	3
(Canada) Simon Larose	5	**6**	6
12	**(Belarus) Max Mirnyi**	**7**	2	**7**

Qualifying competition
1	**(Italy) Laurence Tieleman**	3	**7**	**7**
12	(Belarus) Max Mirnyi	**6**	6	5

==== Second qualifier ====
First round
2	**(United States) Alex O'Brien**	**6**	5	**6**
(Canada) Jocelyn Robichaud	2	**7**	4
(Canada) Emin Ağayev	**6**	6	4
13	**(United States) Michael Russell**	4	**7**	**6**

Qualifying competition
2	(United States) Alex O'Brien	3	**7**	2^{r}
13	**(United States) Michael Russell**	**6**	5	3

==== Third qualifier ====
First round
3	**(United States) Brian MacPhie**	**6**	**6**
(Canada) Ryan Clark	2	2
(Canada) Dominic Boulet	2	3
14	**(Haiti) Ronald Agénor**	**6**	**6**

Qualifying competition
3	**(United States) Brian MacPhie**	**6**	**6**
14	(Haiti) Ronald Agénor	3	4

==== Fourth qualifier ====
First round
4	**(South Africa) Neville Godwin**	**6**	3	**7**
(Canada) David Kepka	2	**6**	6
**(Australia) James Sekulov**	**6**	**6**
11	(United States) David Witt	4	3

Qualifying competition
4	**(South Africa) Neville Godwin**	2	**6**	**7**
(Australia) James Sekulov	**6**	4	6

==== Fifth qualifier ====
First round
5	**(Finland) Tuomas Ketola**	**6**	**6**
WC	(Canada) Hugues Laverdière	0	4
(Canada) Bobby Mahal	2	4
10	**(United States) Doug Flach**	**6**	**6**

Qualifying competition
5	(Finland) Tuomas Ketola	4	4
10	**(United States) Doug Flach**	**6**	**6**

==== Sixth qualifier ====
First round
6	**(Spain) Óscar Burrieza**	**6**	**6**
WC	(Canada) Stephan Timu	1	2
WC	(Canada) Charles-Antoine Sévigny	1	2
9	**(South Africa) David Nainkin**	**6**	**6**

Qualifying competition
6	(Spain) Óscar Burrieza	3	5
9	**(South Africa) David Nainkin**	**6**	**7**

==== Seventh qualifier ====
First round
7	**(Philippines) Cecil Mamiit**	**6**	**6**
(United States) Will Ritter	1	2
**(Zimbabwe) Kevin Ullyett**	**6**	**6**
8	(France) Olivier Delaître	1	2

Qualifying competition
7	**(Philippines) Cecil Mamiit**	**6**	**6**
(Zimbabwe) Kevin Ullyett	3	4
