= 1998 Italian Open – Men's doubles =

Men's doubles
- 1998 Italian Open

Final
- Champions: (India) Mahesh Bhupathi (India) Leander Paes
- Runners-up: (South Africa) Ellis Ferreira (United States) Rick Leach
- Score: 6–4, 4–6, 7–6

Details
- Draw: 32
- Seeds: 8

Events
Singles	men	women
Doubles	men	women
← 1997 ·	Italian Open	· 1999 →

Mark Knowles and Daniel Nestor were the defending champions, but Nestor chose not to participate this year. Knowles team up with Jim Grabb, but lost in the first round to Jonas Björkman and Pat Rafter.

Mahesh Bhupathi and Leander Paes won the title, by defeating Ellis Ferreira and Rick Leach 6–4, 4–6, 7–6 in the final.

== Seeds ==
Champion seeds are indicated in bold text while text in italics indicates the round in which those seeds were eliminated.

1. (Australia) Todd Woodbridge / (Australia) Mark Woodforde (first round)
2. (India) **Mahesh Bhupathi** / (India) **Leander Paes (champions)**
3. (Russia) Yevgeny Kafelnikov / (Czech Republic) Daniel Vacek (quarterfinals)
4. (South Africa) Ellis Ferreira / (United States) Rick Leach (final)
5. (Sweden) Jonas Björkman / (Australia) Patrick Rafter (quarterfinals)
6. (Argentina) Luis Lobo / (Spain) Javier Sánchez (semifinals)
7. (United States) Donald Johnson / (United States) Francisco Montana (first round)
8. (Australia) Joshua Eagle / (Australia) Andrew Florent (first round)

== Draw ==
=== Key ===
- Q = Qualifier
- WC = Wild card
- LL = Lucky loser
- Alt = Alternate
- ITF = ITF entry
- PR = Protected ranking
- SR = Special ranking
- SE = Special exempt
- JE = Junior exempt
- JR = Junior Accelerator Programme entrant
- CO = College Accelerator Programme entrant
- NG = Next Gen Accelerator Program entrant
- w/o = Walkover
- r = Retired
- d = Defaulted

=== Finals ===
Semifinals
(Croatia) Goran Ivanišević (Australia) Mark Philippoussis	3	**7**	6
4	(South Africa) **Ellis Ferreira** **(United States) Rick Leach**	**6**	6	**7**
6	(Argentina) Luis Lobo (Spain) Javier Sánchez	5	**6**	6
2	(India) **Mahesh Bhupathi** **(India) Leander Paes**	**7**	3	**7**

Final
4	(South Africa) Ellis Ferreira (United States) Rick Leach	4	**6**	6
2	(India) **Mahesh Bhupathi** **(India) Leander Paes**	**6**	4	**7**

=== Top half ===
First round
1	(Australia) T Woodbridge (Australia) M Woodforde	4	3
(Ecuador) **N Lapentti** **(Mexico) D Roditi**	**6**	**6**
(United States) **P Galbraith** **(New Zealand) B Steven**	**6**	**6**
(United States) T Kronemann (Australia) D Macpherson	2	4
(Croatia) **G Ivanišević** **(Australia) M Philippoussis**	**6**	**7**
(Australia) L Hewitt (Socialist Federal Republic of Yugoslavia) D Vemić	3	6
(Russia) **A Olhovskiy** **(Czech Republic) P Vízner**	**7**	**6**
7	(United States) D Johnson (United States) F Montana	6	3
4	(South Africa) **E Ferreira** **(United States) R Leach**	**7**	**1**
(Argentina) L Arnold (Argentina) D Orsanic	5	0R
(Italy) **D Nargiso** **(Italy) D Sanguinetti**	**6**	1	**6**
(South Africa) D Adams (South Africa) W Ferreira	4	**6**	3
(Sweden) **T Enqvist** **(Chile) M Ríos**	**6**	**7**
(Germany) M-K Goellner (United States) J Tarango	4	6
5	(Sweden) **J Björkman** **(Australia) P Rafter**	**6**	4	**6**
(United States) J Grabb (The Bahamas) M Knowles	2	**6**	1

Second round
(Ecuador) N Lapentti (Mexico) D Roditi	3	**6**	2
(United States) **P Galbraith** **(New Zealand) B Steven**	**6**	3	**6**
(Croatia) **G Ivanišević** **(Australia) M Philippoussis**	**6**	**6**
(Russia) A Olhovskiy (Czech Republic) P Vízner	3	2
4	(South Africa) **E Ferreira** **(United States) R Leach**	**6**	**6**
(Italy) D Nargiso (Italy) D Sanguinetti	3	3
(Sweden) T Enqvist (Chile) M Ríos	3	6
5	(Sweden) **J Björkman** **(Australia) P Rafter**	**6**	**7**

Quarterfinals
(United States) P Galbraith (New Zealand) B Steven	2	3
(Croatia) **G Ivanišević** **(Australia) M Philippoussis**	**6**	**6**
4	(South Africa) **E Ferreira** **(United States) R Leach**	**6**	**7**
5	(Sweden) J Björkman (Australia) P Rafter	4	6

Semifinals
(Croatia) G Ivanišević (Australia) M Philippoussis	3	**7**	6
4	(South Africa) **E Ferreira** **(United States) R Leach**	**6**	6	**7**

=== Bottom half ===
First round
6	(Argentina) **L Lobo** **(Spain) J Sánchez**	**6**	**6**
(Italy) C Brandi (Italy) F Messori	4	2
(Sweden) **N Kulti** **(Sweden) P Nyborg**	5	**7**	**6**
(Netherlands) T Kempers (Netherlands) M Oosting	**7**	6	3
(United States) **L Jensen** **(United States) M Jensen**	**7**	4	**6**
(United Kingdom) T Henman (United States) P Sampras	5	**6**	2
3	(Russia) **Y Kafelnikov** **(Czech Republic) D Vacek**	**2**	0
(Spain) J Alonso (Spain) A Portas	0	0R
(Australia) **A Kratzmann** **(Brazil) G Kuerten**	**6**	2	**6**
8	(Australia) J Eagle (Australia) A Florent	4	**6**	3
(Belgium) **L Pimek** **(United States) J Waite**	**7**	**6**
(North Macedonia) A Kitinov (Netherlands) F Wibier	6	3
(Australia) **S Stolle** **(Czech Republic) C Suk**	**7**	3	**7**
(United Kingdom) N Broad (South Africa) P Norval	6	**6**	6
(Spain) T Carbonell (Spain) F Roig	0	4
2	(India) **M Bhupathi** **(India) L Paes**	**6**	**6**

Second round
6	(Argentina) **L Lobo** **(Spain) J Sánchez**	**6**	**6**
(Sweden) N Kulti (Sweden) P Nyborg	1	4
(United States) L Jensen (United States) M Jensen	**7**	2	2
3	(Russia) **Y Kafelnikov** **(Czech Republic) D Vacek**	6	**6**	**6**
(Australia) **A Kratzmann** **(Brazil) G Kuerten**	**6**	**6**
(Belgium) L Pimek (United States) J Waite	3	1
(Australia) S Stolle (Czech Republic) C Suk	**7**	5	1
2	(India) **M Bhupathi** **(India) L Paes**	6	**7**	**6**

Quarterfinals
6	(Argentina) **L Lobo** **(Spain) J Sánchez**	5	**6**	**6**
3	(Russia) Y Kafelnikov (Czech Republic) D Vacek	**7**	4	4
(Australia) A Kratzmann (Brazil) G Kuerten	4	4
2	(India) **M Bhupathi** **(India) L Paes**	**6**	**6**

Semifinals
6	(Argentina) L Lobo (Spain) J Sánchez	5	**6**	6
2	(India) **M Bhupathi** **(India) L Paes**	**7**	3	**7**
