= 1998 Italian Open – Women's doubles =

Women's doubles
- 1998 Italian Open
- 1997 Champions: (United States) Nicole Arendt (Netherlands) Manon Bollegraf

Final
- Champions: (Spain) Virginia Ruano Pascual (Argentina) Paola Suárez
- Runners-up: (South Africa) Amanda Coetzer (Spain) Arantxa Sánchez Vicario
- Score: 7–6, 6–4

Events
Singles	men	women
Doubles	men	women
- Italian Open

Nicole Arendt and Manon Bollegraf were the defending champions but only Bollegraf competed that year with Katrina Adams.

Adams and Bollegraf lost in the quarterfinals to Serena Williams and Venus Williams.

Virginia Ruano Pascual and Paola Suárez won in the final 7–6, 6–4 against Amanda Coetzer and Arantxa Sánchez Vicario.

== Seeds ==
Champion seeds are indicated in bold text while text in italics indicates the round in which those seeds were eliminated. The top four seeded teams received byes into the second round.

1. (Indonesia) Yayuk Basuki / (Netherlands) Caroline Vis (quarterfinals)
2. (United States) Katrina Adams / (Netherlands) Manon Bollegraf (quarterfinals)
3. (Russia) Anna Kournikova / (Latvia) Larisa Neiland (second round)
4. (United States) Lisa Raymond / (Australia) Rennae Stubbs (quarterfinals)
5. (Spain) Conchita Martínez / (Argentina) Patricia Tarabini (quarterfinals)
6. (South Africa) Amanda Coetzer / (Spain) Arantxa Sánchez Vicario (final)
7. (Russia) Elena Likhovtseva / (Japan) Ai Sugiyama (second round)
8. (Japan) Naoko Kijimuta / (Japan) Nana Miyagi (first round)

== Draw ==
Key

- Q = Qualifier
- WC = Wild card
- LL = Lucky loser
- Alt = Alternate
- ITF = ITF entry
- PR = Protected ranking
- SR = Special ranking
- SE = Special exempt
- JE = Junior exempt
- JR = Junior Accelerator Programme entrant
- CO = College Accelerator Programme entrant
- NG = Next Gen Accelerator Program entrant
- w/o = Walkover
- r = Retired
- d = Defaulted

=== Final ===
Final

6
- (South Africa) Amanda Coetzer
- (Spain) Arantxa Sánchez Vicario
6
4

- (Spain) **Virginia Ruano Pascual**
- (Argentina) **Paola Suárez**
**7**
**6**

=== Top half ===
First round

Second round

Quarterfinals

Semifinals

1
- (Indonesia) **Y Basuki**
- (Netherlands) **C Vis**
**7**
**6**

Q
- (United States) A Miller
- (United States) T Snyder
0
2

- (Austria) B Schett
- (Switzerland) P Schnyder
5
4

- (Austria) **B Schett**
- (Switzerland) **P Schnyder**
**6**
**6**

1
- (Indonesia) Y Basuki
- (Netherlands) C Vis
3
3

- (Argentina) **F Labat**
- (Belgium) **D Van Roost**
**6**
**6**

- (Argentina) **F Labat**
- (Belgium) **D Van Roost**
**6**
**6**

- (France) A Dechaume-Balleret
- (France) N Tauziat
1
4

- (Argentina) **F Labat**
- (Belgium) **D Van Roost**
**6**
4
**6**

- (Romania) R Dragomir
- (Croatia) I Majoli
**6**
1
1

7
- (Russia) E Likhovtseva
- (Japan) A Sugiyama
1
**6**
1

7
- (Russia) **E Likhovtseva**
- (Japan) **A Sugiyama**
3
**6**
**6**

- (Argentina) F Labat
- (Belgium) D Van Roost
2
**7**
2

6
- (South Africa) **A Coetzer**
- (Spain) **A Sánchez Vicario**
**6**
5
**6**

4
- (United States) **L Raymond**
- (Australia) **R Stubbs**
**6**
**6**

WC
- (Italy) **A Canepa**
- (Italy) **T Garbin**
3
**7**
**6**

WC
- (Italy) A Canepa
- (Italy) T Garbin
2
3

- (United States) M Seles
- (Czech Republic) H Suková
**6**
5
2

4
- (United States) L Raymond
- (Australia) R Stubbs
4
4

- (Chinese Taipei) **J Lee**
- (United States) **C Morariu**
**6**
**6**

6
- (South Africa) **A Coetzer**
- (Spain) **A Sánchez Vicario**
**6**
**6**

- (Italy) R Grande
- (Romania) I Spîrlea
1
2

- (Chinese Taipei) J Lee
- (United States) C Morariu
4
2

- (France) J Halard-Decugis
- (France) S Testud
**6**
4
3

6
- (South Africa) **A Coetzer**
- (Spain) **A Sánchez Vicario**
**6**
**6**

6
- (South Africa) **A Coetzer**
- (Spain) **A Sánchez Vicario**
3
**6**
**6**

=== Bottom half ===
First round

Second round

Quarterfinals

Semifinals

5
- (Spain) **C Martínez**
- (Argentina) **P Tarabini**
**6**
**6**

- (Italy) L Golarsa
- (Argentina) M Paz
3
4

5
- (Spain) **C Martínez**
- (Argentina) **P Tarabini**
**6**
**6**

- (Italy) **S Farina**
- (Argentina) **L Montalvo**
**6**
**7**

- (Italy) S Farina
- (Argentina) L Montalvo
3
2

- (Belarus) O Barabanschikova
- (Slovakia) K Habšudová
2
5

5
- (Spain) C Martínez
- (Argentina) P Tarabini
4
**6**
4

WC
- (Italy) F Lubiani
- (Italy) F Perfetti
3
2

- (Spain) **V Ruano Pascual**
- (Argentina) **P Suárez**
**6**
3
**6**

- (Spain) **V Ruano Pascual**
- (Argentina) **P Suárez**
**6**
**6**

- (Spain) **V Ruano Pascual**
- (Argentina) **P Suárez**
**6**
**6**

3
- (Russia) A Kournikova
- (Latvia) L Neiland
2
4

- (Spain) **V Ruano Pascual**
- (Argentina) **P Suárez**
2
**6**
**7**

8
- (Japan) N Kijimuta
- (Japan) N Miyagi
4
4

- (United States) S Williams
- (United States) V Williams
**6**
4
5

- (United States) **S Williams**
- (United States) **V Williams**
**6**
**6**

- (United States) **S Williams**
- (United States) **V Williams**
**7**
**6**

- (United States) S Cacic
- (France) M Pierce
5
**7**
1

- (Hungary) V Csurgo
- (Japan) Y Yoshida
5
2

- (Hungary) **V Csurgo**
- (Japan) **Y Yoshida**
**7**
5
**6**

- (United States) **S Williams**
- (United States) **V Williams**
**6**
**6**

- (Belgium) **S Appelmans**
- (Netherlands) **M Oremans**
2
**6**
**6**

2
- (United States) K Adams
- (Netherlands) M Bollegraf
2
1

- (Netherlands) S Noorlander
- (Australia) L Pleming
**6**
4
1

- (Belgium) S Appelmans
- (Netherlands) M Oremans
**7**
2
2

2
- (United States) **K Adams**
- (Netherlands) **M Bollegraf**
5
**6**
**6**
