= 1998 du Maurier Open – Women's singles =

Women's singles
- 1998 du Maurier Open

Final
- Champion: (United States) Monica Seles
- Runner-up: (Spain) Arantxa Sánchez Vicario
- Score: 6–3, 6–2

Details
- Draw: 56 (3WC/7Q/2LL)
- Seeds: 16

Events
Singles	men	women
Doubles	men	women
- Canadian Open

Three-time defending champion Monica Seles defeated Arantxa Sánchez Vicario in the final, 6–3, 6–2 to win the women's singles tennis title at the 1998 Canadian Open.

== Seeds ==
A champion seed is indicated in bold text while text in italics indicates the round in which that seed was eliminated. The top nine seeds received a bye to the second round.

1. (Switzerland) Martina Hingis (semifinals)
2. (Czech Republic) Jana Novotná (semifinals)
3. (Spain) Arantxa Sánchez Vicario (final)
4. (United States) ~~Venus Williams~~ (withdrew)
5. (United States) **Monica Seles (champion)**
6. (Spain) Conchita Martínez (quarterfinals)
7. (Germany) Steffi Graf (third round)
8. (South Africa) Amanda Coetzer (third round)
9. (Romania) Irina Spîrlea (third round)
10. (Switzerland) Patty Schnyder (first round)
11. (France) Nathalie Tauziat (third round)
12. (Belgium) Dominique Van Roost (second round)
13. (France) Mary Pierce (first round)
14. (France) Sandrine Testud (quarterfinals)
15. (Russia) Anna Kournikova (third round)
16. (Japan) Ai Sugiyama (third round)
17. (United States) Lisa Raymond (first round)

== Draw ==
Key

- Q = Qualifier
- WC = Wild card
- LL = Lucky loser
- Alt = Alternate
- ITF = ITF entry
- PR = Protected ranking
- SR = Special ranking
- SE = Special exempt
- JE = Junior exempt
- JR = Junior Accelerator Programme entrant
- CO = College Accelerator Programme entrant
- NG = Next Gen Accelerator Program entrant
- w/o = Walkover
- r = Retired
- d = Defaulted

=== Finals ===
Semifinals
1	(Switzerland) Martina Hingis	**6**	3	2
5	**(United States) Monica Seles**	4	**6**	**6**
3	**(Spain) Arantxa Sánchez Vicario**	4	**7^{7}**	**6**
2	(Czech Republic) Jana Novotná	**6**	6^{4}	2

Final
5	**(United States) Monica Seles**	**6**	**6**
3	(Spain) Arantxa Sánchez Vicario	3	2

=== Top half ===
==== Section 1 ====
First round
**(Austria) S Plischke**	**6**	**6**
(Italy) R Grande	1	1
**(Venezuela) M Vento**	**6**	**6**
(France) A Mauresmo	3	4
Q	(France) N Dechy	6^{2}	5
16	**(Japan) A Sugiyama**	**7^{7}**	**7**
14	**(France) S Testud**	**6**	**6**
Q	(Australia) R McQuillan	1	3
**(Croatia) I Majoli**	**6**	**6**
(Austria) B Paulus	3	1
WC	**(Canada) S Jeyaseelan**	**7**	**6**
Q	(Australia) N Pratt	5	3

Second round
1	**(Switzerland) M Hingis**	**6**	**6**
(Austria) S Plischke	4	1
(Venezuela) M Vento	4	0
16	**(Japan) A Sugiyama**	**6**	**6**
14	**(France) S Testud**	6^{5}	**6**	**6**
(Croatia) I Majoli	**7^{7}**	4	1
WC	(Canada) S Jeyaseelan	**7^{7}**	6^{5}	0
9	**(Romania) I Spîrlea**	6^{5}	**7^{7}**	**6**

Third round
1	**(Switzerland) M Hingis**	**6**	**6**
16	(Japan) A Sugiyama	3	0
14	**(France) S Testud**	**7^{7}**	4	**6**
9	(Romania) I Spîrlea	6^{4}	**6**	1

Quarterfinals
1	**(Switzerland) M Hingis**	**7^{7}**	3	**6**
14	(France) S Testud	6^{3}	**6**	4

==== Section 2 ====
First round
**(United States) T Snyder**	**7**	**6**
(United States) A Miller	5	2
**(Indonesia) Y Basuki**	**6**	**6**
Q	(Chinese Taipei) S-T Wang	3	1
WC	(Canada) J Nejedly	4	2
12	**(Belgium) D Van Roost**	**6**	**6**
10	(Switzerland) P Schnyder	4	3
Q	**(Argentina) F Labat**	**6**	**6**
**(Germany) A Huber**	**6**	**6**
WC	(Canada) V Webb	4	1
**(China) F Li**	**6**	**7**
Q	(France) A Dechaume-Balleret	3	5

Second round
5	**(United States) M Seles**	**6**	**6**
(United States) T Snyder	2	1
**(Indonesia) Y Basuki**	**7**	**6**
12	(Belgium) D Van Roost	5	3
Q	(Argentina) F Labat	2	4
**(Germany) A Huber**	**6**	**6**
(China) F Li	3	4
8	**(South Africa) A Coetzer**	**6**	**6**

Third round
5	**(United States) M Seles**	**6**	**6**
(Indonesia) Y Basuki	3	3
**(Germany) A Huber**	**7**	**7^{8}**
8	(South Africa) A Coetzer	5	6^{6}

Quarterfinals
5	**(United States) M Seles**	**6**	**6**
(Germany) A Huber	3	4

=== Bottom half ===
==== Section 3 ====
First round
(France) J Halard-Decugis	0	**7**	6^{5}
Q	**(United States) A Frazier**	**6**	5	**7^{7}**
**(Romania) R Dragomir**	**6**	**7^{7}**
(France) A-G Sidot	3	6^{5}
(France) A Fusai	2	4
15	**(Russia) A Kournikova**	**6**	**6**
11	**(France) N Tauziat**	4	**6**	**6**
Q	(United States) S Cacic	**6**	4	2
(Thailand) T Tanasugarn	1	6^{1}
**(United States) K Po**	**6**	**7^{7}**
(Japan) N Sawamatsu	4	3
**(Slovakia) K Habšudová**	**6**	**6**

Second round
6	**(Spain) C Martínez**	**7^{7}**	**6**
Q	(United States) A Frazier	6^{4}	4
(Romania) R Dragomir	**6**	2	4
15	**(Russia) A Kournikova**	4	**6**	**6**
11	**(France) N Tauziat**	**6**	**6**
(United States) K Po	3	3
(Slovakia) K Habšudová	**6**	5	2
3	**(Spain) A Sánchez Vicario**	0	**7**	**6**

Third round
6	**(Spain) C Martínez**	**6**	**6**
15	(Russia) A Kournikova	0	3
11	(France) N Tauziat	**6**	1	2
3	**(Spain) A Sánchez Vicario**	3	**6**	**6**

Quarterfinals
6	(Spain) C Martínez	3	4
3	**(Spain) A Sánchez Vicario**	**6**	**6**

==== Section 4 ====
First round
**(Spain) V Ruano Pascual**	5	**6**	**6**
LL	(Czech Republic) K Hrdličková	**7**	4	2
LL	(Israel) A Smashnova	**6**	5	2
**(Spain) M Serna**	1	**7**	**6**
**(United States) C Morariu**	**7^{7}**	1	**6**
17	(United States) L Raymond	6^{5}	**6**	2
13	(France) M Pierce	1	1
**(United States) M J Fernández**	**6**	**6**
**(Italy) S Farina**	**7**	6^{1}	**6**
(Austria) B Schett	5	**7^{7}**	1
(Netherlands) M Oremans	4	3
**(Russia) E Likhovtseva**	**6**	**6**

Second round
7	**(Germany) S Graf**	**6**	**6**
(Spain) V Ruano Pascual	0	1
**(Spain) M Serna**	**7^{7}**	**6**
(United States) C Morariu	6^{4}	3
(United States) M J Fernández	5	3
**(Italy) S Farina**	**7**	**6**
(Russia) E Likhovtseva	5	2
2	**(Czech Republic) J Novotná**	**7**	**6**

Third round
7	(Germany) S Graf	4	4
**(Spain) M Serna**	**6**	**6**
(Italy) S Farina	1	4
2	**(Czech Republic) J Novotná**	**6**	**6**

Quarterfinals
(Spain) M Serna	**6**	1	1
2	**(Czech Republic) J Novotná**	2	**6**	**6**

== Qualifying ==
=== Qualifying seeds ===
1. (Israel) Anna Smashnova (qualifying competition, **lucky loser**)
2. (Argentina) **Florencia Labat (qualified)**
3. (n/a)
4. (Belarus) Olga Barabanschikova (first round)
5. (n/a)
6. (France) **Nathalie Dechy (qualified)**
7. (Chinese Taipei) **Wang Shi-ting (qualified)**
8. (Japan) Miho Saeki (qualifying competition, retired)
9. (Australia) **Rachel McQuillan (qualified)**
10. (United States) **Sandra Cacic (qualified)**

=== Qualifiers ===
1. (United States) **Amy Frazier**
2. (Chinese Taipei) **Wang Shi-ting**
3. (Australia) **Rachel McQuillan**
4. (United States) **Sandra Cacic**
5. (Australia) **Nicole Pratt**
6. (France) **Alexia Dechaume-Balleret**
7. (France) **Nathalie Dechy**
8. (Argentina) **Florencia Labat**

=== Lucky losers ===
1. (Israel) **Anna Smashnova**
2. (Czech Republic) **Květa Hrdličková**

=== Qualifying draw ===
==== First qualifier ====
First round
1	**(Israel) Anna Smashnova**	6	**6**	**6**
(France) Amélie Cocheteux	**7**	4	2
**(United States) Amy Frazier**	**6**	**6**
(Germany) Andrea Glass	1	1

Qualifying competition
1	(Israel) Anna Smashnova	5	2
**(United States) Amy Frazier**	**7**	**6**

==== Second qualifier ====
First round
WC	(Canada) Marie-Ève Pelletier	2	0
**(Russia) Elena Makarova**	**6**	**6**
WC	(Canada) Christina Popescu	1	2
7	**(Chinese Taipei) Wang Shi-ting**	**6**	**6**

Qualifying competition
(Russia) Elena Makarova	5	3
7	**(Chinese Taipei) Wang Shi-ting**	**7**	**6**

==== Third qualifier ====
First round
9	**(Australia) Rachel McQuillan**	4	**6**	**6**
Alt	(United States) Jolene Watanabe	**6**	1	3
(Australia) Kerry-Anne Guse	1	4
**(Latvia) Larisa Neiland**	**6**	**6**

Qualifying competition
9	**(Australia) Rachel McQuillan**	**6**	1	**7**
(Latvia) Larisa Neiland	3	**6**	5

==== Fourth qualifier ====
First round
WC	(Canada) Maureen Drake	5	4
**(Japan) Yuka Yoshida**	**7**	**6**
(Czech Republic) Sandra Kleinová	5	0
10	**(United States) Sandra Cacic**	**7**	**6**

Qualifying competition
(Japan) Yuka Yoshida	4	6
10	**(United States) Sandra Cacic**	**6**	**7**

==== Fifth qualifier ====
First round
8	**(Japan) Miho Saeki**	**6**	3	**7**
(United States) Janet Lee	3	**6**	6
(Germany) Barbara Rittner	6	0^{r}
**(Australia) Nicole Pratt**	**7**	2

Qualifying competition
8	(Japan) Miho Saeki	1^{r}
**(Australia) Nicole Pratt**	**6**

==== Sixth qualifier ====
First round
**(France) Alexia Dechaume-Balleret**	**6**	**6**
(Switzerland) Emmanuelle Gagliardi	2	3
**(Japan) Nana Miyagi**	**7**	**6**
4	(Belarus) Olga Barabanschikova	5	4

Qualifying competition
**(France) Alexia Dechaume-Balleret**	**6**	**6**
(Japan) Nana Miyagi	4	3

==== Seventh qualifier ====
First round
6	**(France) Nathalie Dechy**	**7**	**6**
Alt	(United States) Samantha Reeves	5	1
**(Czech Republic) Květa Hrdličková**	**6**	**6**
Alt	(United States) Lilia Osterloh	4	0

Qualifying competition
6	**(France) Nathalie Dechy**	3	**6**	**7**
(Czech Republic) Květa Hrdličková	**6**	1	6

==== Eighth qualifier ====
First round
WC	(Canada) Renata Kolbovic	**6**	5	3
**(Romania) Cătălina Cristea**	2	**7**	**6**
(Russia) Tatiana Panova	1	1
2	**(Argentina) Florencia Labat**	**6**	**6**

Qualifying competition
(Romania) Cătălina Cristea	1	4
2	**(Argentina) Florencia Labat**	**6**	**6**
