= 1998 Great American Insurance ATP Championships – Doubles =

Doubles
- 1998 Great American Insurance ATP Championships

Final
- Champions: (The Bahamas) Mark Knowles (Canada) Daniel Nestor
- Runners-up: (France) Olivier Delaître (France) Fabrice Santoro
- Score: 6–1, 2–1, retired

Events
Singles	Doubles
← 1997 ·	Cincinnati Masters	· 1999 →

Todd Woodbridge and Mark Woodforde were the defending champions, but lost in the quarterfinals to Olivier Delaître and Fabrice Santoro.

Mark Knowles and Daniel Nestor won the title, by defeating Delaitre and Santoro, 6–1, 2–1 (ret) in the finals.

== Seeds ==
Champion seeds are indicated in bold text while text in italics indicates the round in which those seeds were eliminated.

1. (Australia) Todd Woodbridge / (Australia) Mark Woodforde (quarterfinals)
2. (India) Mahesh Bhupathi / (Netherlands) Paul Haarhuis (second round)
3. (Sweden) Jonas Björkman / (Australia) Patrick Rafter (second round)
4. (South Africa) Ellis Ferreira / (United States) Rick Leach (second round)
5. (Russia) Yevgeny Kafelnikov / (Czech Republic) Daniel Vacek (semifinals)
6. (United States) Patrick Galbraith / (Australia) David Macpherson (first round)
7. (United States) Donald Johnson / (United States) Francisco Montana (second round)
8. (n/a)

== Draw ==
=== Key ===
- Q = Qualifier
- WC = Wild card
- LL = Lucky loser
- Alt = Alternate
- SE = Special exempt
- PR = Protected ranking
- ITF = ITF entry
- JE = Junior exempt
- w/o = Walkover
- r = Retired
- d = Defaulted
- SR = Special ranking

=== Finals ===
Semifinals
(France) **Olivier Delaître** **(France) Fabrice Santoro**	**6**	**6**
5	(Russia) Yevgeny Kafelnikov (Czech Republic) Daniel Vacek	2	2
(Mexico) David Roditi (Australia) Michael Tebbutt	3	5
(The Bahamas) **Mark Knowles** **(Canada) Daniel Nestor**	**6**	**7**

Final
(France) Olivier Delaître (France) Fabrice Santoro	1	1^{r}
(The Bahamas) **Mark Knowles** **(Canada) Daniel Nestor**	**6**	2

=== Top half ===
First round
(Australia) **S Stolle** **(Czech Republic) C Suk**	4	**7**	**6**
(Australia) J Eagle (Australia) A Florent	**6**	5	3
(France) **O Delaître** **(France) F Santoro**	3	**6**	**6**
(North Macedonia) A Kitinov (Australia) A Kratzmann	**6**	3	4
(Czech Republic) **M Damm** **(United States) J Grabb**	**6**	**6**
(Australia) B Ellwood (South Africa) M Ondruska	2	3
(United States) **J Gimelstob** **(United States) T Martin**	**6**	**7**
(Spain) À Corretja (Netherlands) J Siemerink	4	6
(Czech Republic) **P Korda** **(Chile) M Ríos**	1	**6**	**6**
(South Africa) D Adams (Netherlands) F Wibier	**6**	3	2
5	(Russia) **Y Kafelnikov** **(Czech Republic) D Vacek**	**6**	**6**
(United States) L Jensen (United States) M Jensen	4	4

Second round
1	(Australia) **T Woodbridge** **(Australia) M Woodforde**	**7**	**7**
(Australia) S Stolle (Czech Republic) C Suk	6	5
(France) **O Delaître** **(France) F Santoro**	**7**	**6**
(Czech Republic) M Damm (United States) J Grabb	6	1
4	(South Africa) Ellis Ferreira (United States) Rick Leach	2	6
(United States) **J Gimelstob** **(United States) T Martin**	**6**	**7**
(Czech Republic) P Korda (Chile) M Ríos
5	(Russia) **Y Kafelnikov** **(Czech Republic) D Vacek**	w/o

Quarterfinals
1	(Australia) T Woodbridge (Australia) M Woodforde	**7**	1	5
(France) **O Delaître** **(France) F Santoro**	6	**6**	**7**
(United States) J Gimelstob (United States) T Martin	4	1
5	(Russia) **Y Kafelnikov** **(Czech Republic) D Vacek**	**6**	**6**

Semifinals
(France) **O Delaître** **(France) F Santoro**	**6**	**6**
5	(Russia) Y Kafelnikov (Czech Republic) D Vacek	2	2

=== Bottom half ===
First round
(Mexico) **D Roditi** **(Australia) M Tebbutt**	**7**	**6**
6	(United States) P Galbraith (Australia) D Macpherson	6	4
(South Africa) **J-L de Jager** **(South Africa) R Koenig**	6	**6**	**6**
(Zimbabwe) B Black (United States) A O'Brien	**7**	3	4
(Zimbabwe) **W Black** **(Canada) S Lareau**	**6**	4	**6**
(United States) J Tarango (Zimbabwe) K Ullyett	3	**6**	1
7	(United States) **D Johnson** **(United States) F Montana**	**6**	**6**
(United States) J Thomas (United States) D Wheaton	4	4
(The Bahamas) **M Knowles** **(Canada) D Nestor**	**6**	**6**
(United States) B Coupe (United States) D Randall	4	4
(Argentina) **P Albano** **(Ecuador) N Lapentti**	**6**	**6**
(United Kingdom) N Broad (South Africa) P Norval	4	4

Second round
(Mexico) **D Roditi** **(Australia) M Tebbutt**	**7**	**6**
(South Africa) J-L de Jager (South Africa) R Koenig	5	4
(Zimbabwe) **W Black** **(Canada) S Lareau**	**6**	**6**
3	(Sweden) J Björkman (Australia) P Rafter	4	4
7	(United States) D Johnson (United States) F Montana	5	**6**	6
(The Bahamas) **M Knowles** **(Canada) D Nestor**	**7**	4	**7**
(Argentina) **P Albano** **(Ecuador) N Lapentti**	**7**	**7**
2	(India) M Bhupathi (Netherlands) P Haarhuis	5	6

Quarterfinals
(Mexico) **D Roditi** **(Australia) M Tebbutt**	6	**6**	**6**
(Zimbabwe) W Black (Canada) S Lareau	**7**	4	4
(The Bahamas) **M Knowles** **(Canada) D Nestor**	**6**	**7**
(Argentina) P Albano (Ecuador) N Lapentti	3	6

Semifinals
(Mexico) D Roditi (Australia) M Tebbutt	3	5
(The Bahamas) **M Knowles** **(Canada) D Nestor**	**6**	**7**
