= 1998 Great American Insurance ATP Championships – Singles =

Singles
- 1998 Great American Insurance ATP Championships

Final
- Champion: (Australia) Patrick Rafter
- Runner-up: (United States) Pete Sampras
- Score: 1–6, 7–6^{(7–2)}, 6–4

Details
- Draw: 56
- Seeds: 16

Events
Singles	Doubles
← 1997 ·	Great American Insurance ATP Championships	· 1999 →

Patrick Rafter defeated the defending champion Pete Sampras in the final, 1–6, 7–6^{(7–2)}, 6–4 to win the singles tennis title at the 1998 Cincinnati Masters.

== Seeds ==
The top eight seeds received a bye to the second round.

1. (United States) Pete Sampras (final)
2. (Chile) Marcelo Ríos (second round)
3. (Czech Republic) Petr Korda (quarterfinals)
4. (Spain) Carlos Moyà (second round)
5. (Australia) Patrick Rafter (champion)
6. (Sweden) Jonas Björkman (second round)
7. (Russia) Yevgeny Kafelnikov (semifinals)
8. (Netherlands) Richard Krajicek (third round)
9. (Spain) Álex Corretja (second round)
10. (United States) Andre Agassi (second round)
11. (United Kingdom) Tim Henman (first round)
12. (Spain) Álbert Costa (second round)
13. (Spain) Alberto Berasategui (first round)
14. (Croatia) Goran Ivanišević (third round)
15. (Spain) Félix Mantilla (first round)
16. (France) Cédric Pioline (second round)

== Draw ==
=== Key ===
- Q = Qualifier
- WC = Wild card
- LL = Lucky loser
- Alt = Alternate
- SE = Special exempt
- PR = Protected ranking
- ITF = ITF entry
- JE = Junior exempt
- w/o = Walkover
- r = Retired
- d = Defaulted
- SR = Special ranking

=== Finals ===
Semifinals
1	(United States) Pete Sampras	7	2	6
(Sweden) Magnus Larsson	5	6	1
5	(Australia) Patrick Rafter	7	6
7	(Russia) Yevgeny Kafelnikov	5	0

Final
1	(United States) Pete Sampras	6	6^{2}	4
5	(Australia) Patrick Rafter	1	7^{7}	6

=== Top half ===
==== Section 1 ====
First round
(Czech Republic) M Damm	6	3	6
(Australia) M Woodforde	4	6	2
(United States) J-M Gambill	6	6
Q	(France) O Delaître	1	3
(Paraguay) R Delgado	6^{4}	3
16	(France) C Pioline	7^{7}	6
10	(United States) A Agassi	4	7^{7}	6
(Germany) N Kiefer	6	6^{3}	2
(United States) J Gimelstob	6	6^{8}	2
(United States) V Spadea	3	7^{10}	6
Q	(France) A Clément	4	3
Q	(Ukraine) A Medvedev	6	6

Second round
1	(United States) P Sampras	6	6
(Czech Republic) M Damm	4	2
(United States) J-M Gambill	6^{5}	7^{7}	6
16	(France) C Pioline	7^{7}	6^{5}	4
10	(United States) A Agassi	2	6	6^{2}
(United States) V Spadea	6	0	7^{7}
Q	(Ukraine) A Medvedev	3	7^{7}	3
8	(Netherlands) R Krajicek	6	6^{5}	6

Third round
1	(United States) P Sampras	7^{7}	6
(United States) J-M Gambill	6^{3}	3
(United States) V Spadea	6	6
8	(Netherlands) R Krajicek	2	3

Quarterfinals
1	(United States) P Sampras	6	6
(United States) V Spadea	3	2

==== Section 2 ====
First round
(France) N Escudé	2	7^{7}	3
Q	(France) J Golmard	6	6^{2}	6
(Sweden) T Johansson	7^{7}	7
(Zimbabwe) W Black	6^{3}	5
(United States) J Tarango	7	6
13	(Spain) A Berasategui	5	2
12	(Spain) Á Costa	1	6	6
Q	(France) S Grosjean	6	4	1
(Germany) T Haas	7^{7}	7^{7}
(United States) J Courier	6^{3}	6^{5}
(Italy) G Pozzi	4	5
(Sweden) M Larsson	6	7

Second round
4	(Spain) C Moyà	4	2
Q	(France) J Golmard	6	6
(Sweden) T Johansson	5	6	7^{7}
(United States) J Tarango	7	2	6^{4}
12	(Spain) Á Costa	1	3
(Germany) T Haas	6	6
(Sweden) M Larsson	6^{5}	6	6
6	(Sweden) J Björkman	7^{7}	2	3

Third round
Q	(France) J Golmard	6^{5}	6^{2}
(Sweden) T Johansson	7^{7}	7^{7}
(Germany) T Haas	4	4
(Sweden) M Larsson	6	6

Quarterfinals
(Sweden) T Johansson	4	6^{2}
(Sweden) M Larsson	6	7^{7}

=== Bottom half ===
==== Section 3 ====
First round
Q	(Austria) W Schranz	6^{5}	7	4
(France) G Raoux	7^{7}	5	6
(United States) T Martin	6	6
(France) F Santoro	1	4
(Austria) T Muster	6	7
11	(United Kingdom) T Henman	4	5
14	(Croatia) G Ivanišević	6	0	6
(Australia) A Ilie	4	6	4
(Zimbabwe) B Black	2	3
(Australia) M Philippoussis	6	6
WC	(United States) S Campbell	7	2	3
Q	(South Africa) M Ondruska	5	6	6

Second round
5	(Australia) P Rafter	6	6
(France) G Raoux	1	3
(United States) T Martin	6	6
(Austria) T Muster	3	4
14	(Croatia) G Ivanišević	6	6
(Australia) M Philippoussis	3	2
Q	(South Africa) M Ondruska	2	3
3	(Czech Republic) P Korda	6	6

Third round
5	(Australia) P Rafter	3	6	6
(United States) T Martin	6	3	2
14	(Croatia) G Ivanišević	7	4	5
3	(Czech Republic) P Korda	5	6	7

Quarterfinals
5	(Australia) P Rafter	6	7^{10}
3	(Czech Republic) P Korda	4	6^{8}

==== Section 4 ====
First round
(Australia) T Woodbridge	1	6	2
(United States) M Chang	6	3	6
(Australia) S Draper	6	4	7
(Ecuador) N Lapentti	4	6	5
WC	(United States) A O'Brien	3	7^{7}	6^{7}
9	(Spain) Á Corretja	6	6^{3}	7^{9}
15	(Spain) F Mantilla	6^{5}	5
(South Africa) W Ferreira	7^{7}	7
(Netherlands) J Siemerink	1	6	7^{7}
(Netherlands) S Schalken	6	1	6^{2}
(Czech Republic) D Vacek	6	3	7^{10}
(Australia) J Stoltenberg	2	6	6^{8}

Second round
7	(Russia) Y Kafelnikov	6	4	6
(United States) M Chang	3	6	4
(Australia) S Draper	6	6^{5}	7^{7}
9	(Spain) Á Corretja	3	7^{7}	6^{5}
(South Africa) W Ferreira	6^{5}	4
(Netherlands) J Siemerink	7^{7}	6
(Czech Republic) D Vacek	6	6
2	(Chile) M Ríos	3	2

Third round
7	(Russia) Y Kafelnikov	6	6
(Australia) S Draper	3	3
(Netherlands) J Siemerink	1	4
(Czech Republic) D Vacek	6	6

Quarterfinals
7	(Russia) Y Kafelnikov	6	6
(Czech Republic) D Vacek	4	4
