= 1998 Great American Insurance ATP Championships =

- Date: August 10–17
- Edition: 97th
- Category: ATP Super 9
- Draw: 56S / 28D
- Prize money: $2,200,000
- Surface: Hard / outdoor
- Location: Mason, United States
- Venue: Lindner Family Tennis Center

Champions

Singles
- (Australia) Patrick Rafter

Doubles
- (The Bahamas) Mark Knowles / (Canada) Daniel Nestor
- Cincinnati Masters

The 1998 Cincinnati Open, known by the corporate title of the Great American Insurance ATP Championships was a tennis tournament played on outdoor hard courts. It was the 95th edition of the tournament previously known as the Thriftway ATP Championships, and was part of the ATP Super 9 of the 1998 ATP Tour. It took place in Mason, United States, from August 10 through August 17, 1998.

The tournament had previously appeared on the Tier III of the WTA Tour but no event was held from 1989 to 2003.

== Finals ==
=== Singles ===
(Australia) Patrick Rafter defeated (United States) Pete Sampras, 1–6, 7–6^{(7–2)}, 6–4

- It was Rafter's 4th title of the year and his 6th overall. It was his 2nd Masters title of the year and overall.

=== Doubles ===
(The Bahamas) Mark Knowles / (Canada) Daniel Nestor defeated (France) Olivier Delaître / (France) Fabrice Santoro, 6–1, 2–1, ret.
