= 1998 Italian Open – Men's singles =

Men's singles
- 1998 Italian Open

Final
- Champion: (Chile) Marcelo Ríos
- Runner-up: (Spain) Albert Costa
- Score: Walkover

Details
- Draw: 64 (5WC/8Q/1LL)
- Seeds: 16

Events
Singles	men	women
Doubles	men	women
- Italian Open

Marcelo Ríos won the men's singles tennis title at the 1998 Italian Open after Albert Costa withdrew from the final due to a right wrist injury.

Álex Corretja was the defending champion, but lost in the second round to Karim Alami.

== Seeds ==
1. (United States) Pete Sampras (third round)
2. (Czech Republic) Petr Korda (first round)
3. (Chile) Marcelo Ríos (champion)
4. (Australia) Patrick Rafter (first round)
5. (United Kingdom) Greg Rusedski (first round)
6. (Russia) Yevgeny Kafelnikov (third round)
7. (Sweden) Jonas Björkman (first round)
8. (Brazil) Gustavo Kuerten (semifinals)
9. (Spain) Álex Corretja (second round)
10. (Slovakia) Karol Kučera (first round)
11. (Netherlands) Richard Krajicek (quarterfinals)
12. (Spain) Alberto Berasategui (semifinals)
13. (Spain) Félix Mantilla (second round)
14. (Spain) Carlos Moyà (third round)
15. (United States) Michael Chang (quarterfinals)
16. (France) Cédric Pioline (second round)

== Draw ==
Key

- Q = Qualifier
- WC = Wild card
- LL = Lucky loser
- Alt = Alternate
- ITF = ITF entry
- PR = Protected ranking
- SR = Special ranking
- SE = Special exempt
- JE = Junior exempt
- JR = Junior Accelerator Programme entrant
- CO = College Accelerator Programme entrant
- NG = Next Gen Accelerator Program entrant
- w/o = Walkover
- r = Retired
- d = Defaulted

=== Finals ===
Semifinals
(Spain) Albert Costa	6	4	6
12	(Spain) Alberto Berasategui	3	6	3
3	(Chile) Marcelo Ríos	6	7
8	(Brazil) Gustavo Kuerten	0	5

Final
(Spain) Albert Costa
3	(Chile) Marcelo Ríos	w/o

=== Top half ===
==== Section 1 ====
First round
1	(United States) P Sampras	7^{7}	6
(Sweden) T Enqvist	6^{3}	4
(Sweden) M Norman	6	1
(Spain) S Bruguera	3	0^{r}
(Netherlands) J Siemerink	1	4
Q	(France) A Clément	6	6
(Ukraine) A Medvedev	2	6	3
15	(United States) M Chang	6	4	6
9	(Spain) Á Corretja	7^{7}	6
(Australia) M Woodforde	6^{1}	4
(Morocco) K Alami	6	3	7
(Italy) A Gaudenzi	3	6	5
Q	(Argentina) H Gumy	3	1
(Spain) A Costa	6	6
(Belgium) F Dewulf	6	6
7	(Sweden) J Björkman	2	3

Second round
1	(United States) P Sampras	7^{10}	6
(Sweden) M Norman	6^{8}	4
Q	(France) A Clément	5	1
15	(United States) M Chang	7	6
9	(Spain) Á Corretja	6	6^{5}	4
(Morocco) K Alami	3	7^{7}	6
(Spain) A Costa	6	6
(Belgium) F Dewulf	1	4

Third round
1	(United States) P Sampras	2	6^{6}
15	(United States) M Chang	6	7^{8}
(Morocco) K Alami	2	6^{7}
(Spain) A Costa	6	7^{9}

Quarterfinals
15	(United States) M Chang	2	1
(Spain) A Costa	6	6

==== Section 2 ====
First round
4	(Australia) P Rafter	3	7^{7}	4
LL	(Netherlands) S Schalken	6	6^{4}	6
(New Zealand) B Steven	7	6
(France) G Raoux	5	2
Q	(Federal Republic of Yugoslavia) D Vemić	2	4
(Spain) F Clavet	6	6
(Spain) G Blanco	4	6	2
14	(Spain) C Moyà	6	2	6
12	(Spain) A Berasategui	6	6
Q	(Italy) G Galimberti	4	2
(South Africa) W Ferreira	6	6
Q	(Argentina) L Arnold Ker	1	1
(United States) J Tarango	4	1
Q	(France) J Golmard	6	6
(Czech Republic) B Ulihrach	7	7^{10}
5	(United Kingdom) G Rusedski	5	6^{8}

Second round
LL	(Netherlands) S Schalken	6	3	1
(New Zealand) B Steven	2	6	6
(Spain) F Clavet	3	6^{4}
14	(Spain) C Moyà	6	7^{7}
12	(Spain) A Berasategui	6	7^{7}
(South Africa) W Ferreira	3	6^{1}
Q	(France) J Golmard	2	2
(Czech Republic) B Ulihrach	6	6

Third round
(New Zealand) B Steven	7	6
14	(Spain) C Moyà	5	0
12	(Spain) A Berasategui	7^{7}	4	6
(Czech Republic) B Ulihrach	6^{3}	6	3

Quarterfinals
(New Zealand) B Steven	4	2
12	(Spain) A Berasategui	6	6

=== Bottom half ===
==== Section 3 ====
First round
6	(Russia) Y Kafelnikov	7^{7}	6
(Sweden) T Johansson	6^{5}	2
(Spain) A Portas	7	6^{2}	4
(United States) T Martin	5	7^{7}	6
(Australia) R Fromberg	6	5	3
(France) N Escudé	3	7	6
(Australia) M Philippoussis	7	6^{4}	1
11	(Netherlands) R Krajicek	5	7^{7}	6
13	(Spain) F Mantilla	6	6
(United States) J Courier	2	3
(Austria) T Muster	6	6
(Uruguay) M Filippini	1	0
(France) F Santoro	1	0
(United Kingdom) T Henman	6	6
WC	(Italy) M Martelli	3	0
3	(Chile) M Ríos	6	6

Second round
6	(Russia) Y Kafelnikov	1	7^{7}	6
(United States) T Martin	6	6^{4}	3
(France) N Escudé	3	3
11	(Netherlands) R Krajicek	6	6
13	(Spain) F Mantilla	4	6	4
(Austria) T Muster	6	3	6
(United Kingdom) T Henman	3	1
3	(Chile) M Ríos	6	6

Third round
6	(Russia) Y Kafelnikov	2	6	6^{6}
11	(Netherlands) R Krajicek	6	3	7^{8}
(Austria) T Muster	3	1
3	(Chile) M Ríos	6	6

Quarterfinals
11	(Netherlands) R Krajicek	6^{9}	3
3	(Chile) M Ríos	7^{11}	6

==== Section 4 ====
First round
8	(Brazil) G Kuerten	1	6	6
(Spain) C Costa	6	4	2
Q	(Ecuador) N Lapentti	7^{7}	6
WC	(Italy) G Pozzi	6^{1}	4
(Germany) T Haas	4	6	6
WC	(Italy) D Nargiso	6	3	3
WC	(Italy) V Santopadre	6	6
10	(Slovakia) K Kučera	4	3
16	(France) C Pioline	6	6
(Croatia) G Ivanišević	4	4
(Spain) J Alonso	1	0
WC	(Italy) D Sanguinetti	6	6
Q	(Spain) F Vicente	2	6	6
(Germany) M-K Goellner	6	3	1
(Morocco) H Arazi	6	6
2	(Czech Republic) P Korda	2	4

Second round
8	(Brazil) G Kuerten	6	7
Q	(Ecuador) N Lapentti	0	5
(Germany) T Haas	6	6
WC	(Italy) V Santopadre	2	1
16	(France) C Pioline	4	2
WC	(Italy) D Sanguinetti	6	6
Q	(Spain) F Vicente	3	6	6
(Morocco) H Arazi	6	3	2

Third round
8	(Brazil) G Kuerten	6	6
(Germany) T Haas	4	2
WC	(Italy) D Sanguinetti	2	5
Q	(Spain) F Vicente	6	7

Quarterfinals
8	(Brazil) G Kuerten	6	6
Q	(Spain) F Vicente	3	4

== Qualifying ==
=== Qualifying seeds ===
1. (Ecuador) Nicolás Lapentti (qualified)
2. (Netherlands) Sjeng Schalken (qualifying competition, lucky loser)
3. (Spain) Javier Sánchez (qualifying competition)
4. (Czech Republic) Daniel Vacek (qualifying competition)
5. (France) Jérôme Golmard (qualified)
6. (Argentina) Hernán Gumy (qualified)
7. (France) Arnaud Clément (qualified)
8. (Argentina) Lucas Arnold Ker (qualified)
9. (Netherlands) John van Lottum (qualifying competition)
10. (India) Leander Paes (qualifying competition)
11. (Germany) Rainer Schüttler (qualifying competition)
12. (Germany) Martin Sinner (first round)
13. (Spain) Fernando Vicente (qualified)
14. (Australia) Sandon Stolle (first round)
15. (Spain) Emilio Benfele Álvarez (first round)
16. (Italy) Davide Scala (first round)

=== Qualifiers ===
1. (Ecuador) Nicolás Lapentti
2. (Italy) Giorgio Galimberti
3. (Spain) Fernando Vicente
4. (Federal Republic of Yugoslavia) Dušan Vemić
5. (France) Jérôme Golmard
6. (Argentina) Hernán Gumy
7. (France) Arnaud Clément
8. (Argentina) Lucas Arnold Ker

=== Lucky loser ===
1. (Netherlands) Sjeng Schalken

=== Qualifying draw ===
==== First qualifier ====
First round
1	(Ecuador) Nicolás Lapentti	6	6
(Italy) Daniele Musa	2	1
(Italy) Mosé Navarra	7	2	6
16	(Italy) Davide Scala	5	6	4

Qualifying competition
1	(Ecuador) Nicolás Lapentti	7	6
(Italy) Mosé Navarra	6	2

==== Second qualifier ====
First round
2	(Netherlands) Sjeng Schalken	6	4	6
WC	(Italy) Florian Allgauer	3	6	4
WC	(Italy) Giorgio Galimberti	7	7
15	(Spain) Emilio Benfele Álvarez	5	6

Qualifying competition
2	(Netherlands) Sjeng Schalken	4	2
WC	(Italy) Giorgio Galimberti	6	6

==== Third qualifier ====
First round
3	(Spain) Javier Sánchez	6	6
(Italy) Marco Meneschincheri	2	4
(Netherlands) Fernon Wibier	6	4	4
13	(Spain) Fernando Vicente	4	6	6

Qualifying competition
3	(Spain) Javier Sánchez	1	7	1
13	(Spain) Fernando Vicente	6	6	6

==== Fourth qualifier ====
First round
4	(Czech Republic) Daniel Vacek	4	7	6
WC	(Italy) Federico Luzzi	6	5	4
(Federal Republic of Yugoslavia) Dušan Vemić	6	2	6
14	(Australia) Sandon Stolle	4	6	4

Qualifying competition
4	(Czech Republic) Daniel Vacek	3	6
(Federal Republic of Yugoslavia) Dušan Vemić	6	7

==== Fifth qualifier ====
First round
5	(France) Jérôme Golmard	6	7
(Spain) Roberto Carretero	1	5
(Italy) Fabio Maggi	6	6
12	(Germany) Martin Sinner	3	2

Qualifying competition
5	(France) Jérôme Golmard	7	6
(Italy) Fabio Maggi	6	2

==== Sixth qualifier ====
First round
6	(Argentina) Hernán Gumy	7	6
(Australia) Lleyton Hewitt	6	1
(Italy) Elia Grossi	1	0
11	(Germany) Rainer Schüttler	6	6

Qualifying competition
6	(Argentina) Hernán Gumy	6	6
11	(Germany) Rainer Schüttler	0	1

==== Seventh qualifier ====
First round
7	(France) Arnaud Clément	7	6
(France) Rodolphe Gilbert	6	1
(Sweden) Nicklas Kulti	6	6
10	(India) Leander Paes	7	7

Qualifying competition
7	(France) Arnaud Clément	6	6
10	(India) Leander Paes	3	2

==== Eighth qualifier ====
First round
8	(Argentina) Lucas Arnold Ker	6	6
WC	(Italy) Daniele Bracciali	2	3
(Romania) Răzvan Sabău	4	5
9	(Netherlands) John van Lottum	6	7

Qualifying competition
8	(Argentina) Lucas Arnold Ker	6	6
9	(Netherlands) John van Lottum	2	2
