= 1998 Italian Open – Women's singles =

Women's singles
- 1998 Italian Open

Final
- Champion: (Switzerland) Martina Hingis
- Runner-up: (United States) Venus Williams
- Score: 6–3, 2–6, 6–3

Details
- Draw: 56
- Seeds: 16

Events
Singles	men	women
Doubles	men	women
← 1997 ·	Italian Open	· 1999 →

Martina Hingis defeated Venus Williams in the final, with a score of 6–3, 2–6, 6–3 to win the women's singles tennis title at the 1998 Italian Open.

Mary Pierce was the defending champion, but lost in the third round to Mirjana Lučić.

== Seeds ==
A champion seed is indicated in bold text while text in italics indicates the round in which that seed was eliminated. The top eight seeds received a bye to the second round.

1. (Switzerland) **Martina Hingis (champion)**
2. (Czech Republic) Jana Novotná (second round)
3. (South Africa) Amanda Coetzer (second round)
4. (France) Mary Pierce (third round)
5. (Spain) Arantxa Sánchez-Vicario (semifinals)
6. (United States) Monica Seles (third round)
7. (Spain) Conchita Martínez (third round)
8. (Croatia) Iva Majoli (third round)
9. (United States) Venus Williams (final)
10. (Romania) Irina Spîrlea (third round)
11. (France) Nathalie Tauziat (first round)
12. (France) Sandrine Testud (quarterfinals)
13. (Belgium) Dominique Van Roost (third round)
14. (Russia) Anna Kournikova (quarterfinals)
15. (United States) Lisa Raymond (quarterfinals)
16. (Switzerland) Patty Schnyder (first round)

== Draw ==
=== Key ===
- Q = Qualifier
- WC = Wild card
- LL = Lucky loser
- Alt = Alternate
- ITF = ITF entry
- PR = Protected ranking
- SR = Special ranking
- SE = Special exempt
- JE = Junior exempt
- JR = Junior Accelerator Programme entrant
- CO = College Accelerator Programme entrant
- NG = Next Gen Accelerator Program entrant
- w/o = Walkover
- r = Retired
- d = Defaulted

=== Finals ===
Quarterfinals
1	**(Switzerland) Martina Hingis**	**6**	**6**
14	(Russia) Anna Kournikova	2	4
(Croatia) **Mirjana Lučić**	**7**	0
12	(France) Sandrine Testud	5	0^{r}
5	(Spain) **Arantxa Sánchez Vicario**	6	**6**	**6**
15	(United States) Lisa Raymond	**7**	1	2
(United States) Serena Williams	4	2
9	(United States) **Venus Williams**	**6**	**6**

Semifinals
1	(Switzerland) **Martina Hingis**	**6**	**6**
(Croatia) Mirjana Lučić	2	1
5	(Spain) Arantxa Sánchez Vicario	3	**6**	5
9	(United States) **Venus Williams**	**6**	2	**7**

Final
1	(Switzerland) **Martina Hingis**	**6**	2	**6**
9	(United States) Venus Williams	3	**6**	3

=== Top half ===
==== Section 1 ====
First round
(China) **F Li**	**7**	**6**
(Belarus) O Barabanschikova	6	2
(Spain) G León García	5	3
(Spain) **V Ruano Pascual**	**7**	**6**
(France) J Halard-Decugis	4	2
10	(Romania) **I Spîrlea**	**6**	**6**
14	(Russia) **A Kournikova**	**6**	**6**
Q	(Hungary) V Csurgo	0	1
(Venezuela) M Vento	2	3
(Austria) **B Paulus**	**6**	**6**
Q	(Germany) **J Kandarr**	4	**6**	**7**
(Argentina) F Labat	**6**	4	6

Second round
1	(Switzerland) **M Hingis**	**6**	**6**
(China) F Li	3	0
(Spain) V Ruano Pascual	3	6
10	(Romania) **I Spîrlea**	**6**	**7**
14	(Russia) **A Kournikova**	**6**	**6**
(Austria) B Paulus	2	2
Q	(Germany) J Kandarr	**6**	4	4
8	(Croatia) **I Majoli**	4	**6**	**6**

Third round
1	(Switzerland) **M Hingis**	**6**	**6**
10	(Romania) I Spîrlea	1	2
14	(Russia) **A Kournikova**	**6**	3	**6**
8	(Croatia) I Majoli	3	**6**	2

Quarterfinals
1	(Switzerland) **M Hingis**	**6**	**6**
14	(Russia) A Kournikova	2	4

==== Section 2 ====
First round
(France) **S Pitkowski**	**6**	3	**6**
(Belgium) S Appelmans	1	**6**	3
(Croatia) **M Lučić**	**6**	6	**7**
(United States) S Cacic	1	**7**	6
(Russia) **E Likhovtseva**	4	**6**	**6**
16	(Switzerland) P Schnyder	**6**	4	4
12	(France) **S Testud**	2	**6**	**6**
WC	(Italy) L Golarsa	**6**	4	2
(Austria) **B Schett**	4	**6**	**6**
(Poland) M Grzybowska	**6**	3	2
WC	(Italy) F Lubiani	0	1
(Italy) **S Farina**	**6**	**6**

Second round
4	(France) **M Pierce**	**6**	**6**
(France) S Pitkowski	1	2
(Croatia) **M Lučić**	3	**6**	**6**
(Russia) E Likhovtseva	**6**	2	2
12	(France) **S Testud**	4	**6**	**6**
(Austria) B Schett	**6**	2	3
(Italy) S Farina	2	1
6	(United States) **M Seles**	**6**	**6**

Third round
4	(France) M Pierce	5	4
(Croatia) **M Lučić**	**7**	**6**
12	(France) **S Testud**	**6**	4	**7**
6	(United States) M Seles	2	**6**	5

Quarterfinals
(Croatia) **M Lučić**	**7**	0
12	(France) S Testud	5	0^{r}

=== Bottom half ===
==== Section 3 ====
First round
Q	(Spain) **C Torrens Valero**	4	**6**	**6**
(Netherlands) B Schultz-McCarthy	**6**	2	3
(Belgium) L Courtois	**6**	2	4
(Japan) **N Sawamatsu**	1	**6**	**6**
(Slovakia) K Habšudová	4	2
13	(Belgium) **D Van Roost**	**6**	**6**
15	(United States) **L Raymond**	2	**6**	**7**
(France) A-G Sidot	**6**	3	5
(Italy) R Grande	3	0
Q	(United States) **A Miller**	**6**	**6**
(Romania) **R Dragomir**	**6**	**6**
WC	(United States) J Capriati	3	2

Second round
6	(Spain) **A Sánchez-Vicario**	**6**	**7**
Q	(Spain) C Torrens Valero	3	5
(Japan) N Sawamatsu	4	4
13	(Belgium) **D Van Roost**	**6**	**6**
15	(United States) **L Raymond**	**6**	3	**7**
Q	(United States) A Miller	2	**6**	6
(Romania) **R Dragomir**	**6**	**6**
3	(South Africa) A Coetzer	2	2

Third round
6	(Spain) **A Sánchez-Vicario**	**6**	**6**
13	(Belgium) D Van Roost	1	2
15	(United States) **L Raymond**	**6**	**6**
(Romania) R Dragomir	4	1

Quarterfinals
6	(Spain) **A Sánchez-Vicario**	6	**6**	**6**
15	(United States) L Raymond	**7**	1	2

==== Section 4 ====
First round
WC	(Italy) **F Perfetti**	**7**	**6**
Q	(Switzerland) E Gagliardi	5	2
Q	(Italy) T Garbin	**7**	4	1
(South Africa) **J Kruger**	6	**6**	**6**
(United States) **S Williams**	**7**	**6**
11	(France) N Tauziat	5	0
9	(United States) **V Williams**	**6**	**6**
(Indonesia) Y Basuki	2	3
(Netherlands) M Oremans	4	1
Q	(Spain) **M Sánchez Lorenzo**	**6**	**6**
Q	(France) **A Fusai**	**7**	**6**
(Japan) A Sugiyama	6	0

Second round
7	(Spain) **C Martínez**	**6**	4	**6**
WC	(Italy) F Perfetti	1	**6**	3
(South Africa) J Kruger	1^{r}
(United States) **S Williams**	5
9	(United States) **V Williams**	**6**	**6**
Q	(Spain) M Sánchez Lorenzo	1	4
Q	(France) **A Fusai**	2	**7**	**6**
2	(Czech Republic) J Novotná	**6**	6	3

Third round
7	(Spain) C Martínez	2	2
(United States) **S Williams**	**6**	**6**
9	(United States) **V Williams**	**6**	**6**
Q	(France) A Fusai	1	1

Quarterfinals
(United States) S Williams	4	2
9	(United States) **V Williams**	**6**	**6**
