= 1998 du Maurier Open – Men's doubles =

Men's doubles
- 1998 du Maurier Open

Final
- Champions: (Czech Republic) Martin Damm (United States) Jim Grabb
- Runners-up: (South Africa) Ellis Ferreira (United States) Rick Leach
- Score: 6–7, 6–2, 7–6

Details
- Draw: 28 (5WC/2Q)
- Seeds: 8

Events
Singles	men	women
Doubles	men	women
← 1997 ·	Canadian Open	· 1999 →

Mahesh Bhupathi and Leander Paes were the defending champions, but lost in the semifinals to the eventual runners-up Ellis Ferreira and Rick Leach.

Martin Damm and Jim Grabb won the title, by defeating Ferreira and Leach, 6–7, 6–2, 7–6 in the final.

== Seeds ==
Champion seeds are indicated in bold text while text in italics indicates the round in which those seeds were eliminated.

1. (India) Mahesh Bhupathi / (India) Leander Paes (semifinals)
2. (Sweden) Jonas Björkman / (Australia) Patrick Rafter (semifinals, retired)
3. (South Africa) Ellis Ferreira / (United States) Rick Leach (final)
4. (Russia) Yevgeny Kafelnikov / (Czech Republic) Daniel Vacek (second round)
5. (United States) Donald Johnson / (United States) Francisco Montana (quarterfinals)
6. Unknown (withdrew)
7. (The Bahamas) Mark Knowles / (Canada) Daniel Nestor (quarterfinals)
8. (Zimbabwe) Wayne Black / (Canada) Sébastien Lareau (quarterfinals)

== Draw ==
=== Key ===
- Q = Qualifier
- WC = Wild card
- LL = Lucky loser
- Alt = Alternate
- SE = Special exempt
- PR = Protected ranking
- ITF = ITF entry
- JE = Junior exempt
- w/o = Walkover
- r = Retired
- d = Defaulted
- SR = Special ranking

=== Finals ===
Semifinals
1	(India) Mahesh Bhupathi (India) Leander Paes	6	3
3	(South Africa) **Ellis Ferreira** **(United States) Rick Leach**	**7**	**6**
(Czech Republic) **Martin Damm** **(United States) Jim Grabb**	3	**7**
2	(Sweden) Jonas Björkman (Australia) Patrick Rafter	**6**	6^{r}

Final
3	(South Africa) Ellis Ferreira (United States) Rick Leach	**7**	2	6
(Czech Republic) **Martin Damm** **(United States) Jim Grabb**	6	**6**	**7**

=== Top half ===
First round
(United States) **B Coupe** **(United States) D Randall**	**6**	**6**
(South Africa) G Stafford (Zimbabwe) K Ullyett	3	4
(France) **O Delaître** **(France) F Santoro**	**7**	**6**
(Canada) B Kokavec (Canada) F Niemeyer	5	2
8	(Zimbabwe) **W Black** **(Canada) S Lareau**	**6**	**6**
(Australia) D Macpherson (United States) B MacPhie	1	2
(Australia) **J Eagle** **(Netherlands) J Siemerink**	**6**	**7**
(Germany) T Haas (Canada) J Robichaud	2	5
(Armenia) **S Sargsian** **(United States) G Van Emburgh**	**7**	**6**
(United States) L Jensen (United States) M Jensen	6	0
5	(United States) **D Johnson** **(United States) F Montana**	2	**6**	**6**
(Canada) S Larose (Canada) J Turek	**6**	4	3

Second round
1	(India) **M Bhupathi** **(India) L Paes**	**6**	**6**
(United States) B Coupe (United States) D Randall	4	0
(France) O Delaître (France) F Santoro	4	4
8	(Zimbabwe) **W Black** **(Canada) S Lareau**	**6**	**6**
3	(South Africa) **E Ferreira** **(United States) R Leach**	4	**7**	**6**
(Australia) J Eagle (Netherlands) J Siemerink	**6**	6	4
(Armenia) S Sargsian (United States) G Van Emburgh	1	5
5	(United States) **D Johnson** **(United States) F Montana**	**6**	**7**

Quarterfinals
1	(India) **M Bhupathi** **(India) L Paes**	**6**	5	**6**
8	(Zimbabwe) W Black (Canada) S Lareau	2	**7**	4
3	(South Africa) **E Ferreira** **(United States) R Leach**	**6**	**6**
5	(United States) D Johnson (United States) F Montana	2	1

Semifinals
1	(India) M Bhupathi (India) L Paes	6	3
3	(South Africa) **E Ferreira** **(United States) R Leach**	**7**	**6**

=== Bottom half ===
First round
(Czech Republic) **M Damm** **(United States) J Grabb**	6	**6**	**6**
(United States) D Flach (Australia) M Tebbutt	**7**	3	0
(Australia) **A Kratzmann** **(Brazil) G Kuerten**	**6**	3	**6**
(Mexico) D Roditi (United States) J Tarango	3	**6**	3
(Australia) **S Stolle** **(Czech Republic) C Suk**	**7**	**6**
(South Africa) J-L de Jager (South Africa) R Koenig	6	4
7	(The Bahamas) **M Knowles** **(Canada) D Nestor**	**6**	**7**
(North Macedonia) A Kitinov (Netherlands) F Wibier	3	5
(Croatia) **G Ivanišević** **(Australia) M Philippoussis**	**6**	**6**
(South Africa) D Adams (Belarus) Max Mirnyi	3	4
(United States) **P Galbraith** **(United States) T Martin**	6	**7**	**6**
(Zimbabwe) B Black (United States) A O'Brien	**7**	5	2

Second round
(Czech Republic) **M Damm** **(United States) J Grabb**	w/o
(Australia) A Kratzmann (Brazil) G Kuerten
(Australia) **S Stolle** **(Czech Republic) C Suk**	4	**7**	**7**
4	(Russia) Y Kafelnikov (Czech Republic) D Vacek	**6**	6	6
7	(The Bahamas) **M Knowles** **(Canada) D Nestor**	4
(Croatia) G Ivanišević (Australia) M Philippoussis	2^{r}
(United States) P Galbraith (United States) T Martin	2	1
2	(Sweden) **J Björkman** **(Australia) P Rafter**	**6**	**6**

Quarterfinals
(Czech Republic) **M Damm** **(United States) J Grabb**	**6**	**6**
(Australia) S Stolle (Czech Republic) C Suk	3	1
7	(The Bahamas) M Knowles (Canada) D Nestor	5	3
2	(Sweden) **J Björkman** **(Australia) P Rafter**	**7**	**6**

Semifinals
(Czech Republic) **M Damm** **(United States) J Grabb**	3	**7**
2	(Sweden) J Björkman (Australia) P Rafter	**6**	6^{r}

== Qualifying ==
=== Qualifying seeds ===
1. **(United States) Brandon Coupe / (United States) Dave Randall (qualified)**
2. (United States) Mark Keil / (United States) T. J. Middleton (first round)
3. (United States) Patrick Galbraith / (United States) Todd Martin (qualifying competition)
4. (South Africa) Neville Godwin / (Finland) Tuomas Ketola (qualifying competition)

=== Qualifiers ===
1. **(United States) Brandon Coupe / (United States) Dave Randall**
2. **(Armenia) Sargis Sargsian / (United States) Greg Van Emburgh**

=== Qualifying draw ===
==== First qualifier ====
First round
1	**(United States) Brandon Coupe** **(United States) Dave Randall**	**6**	**6**
WC	(Canada) Dominic Boulet (Canada) David Kepka	3	2
WC	(Canada) Emin Ağayev (Canada) Bobby Mahal	4	6
4	**(South Africa) Neville Godwin** **(Finland) Tuomas Ketola**	**6**	**7**

Qualifying competition
1	**(United States) Brandon Coupe** **(United States) Dave Randall**	**6**	**6**
4	(South Africa) Neville Godwin (Finland) Tuomas Ketola	3	3

==== Second qualifier ====
First round
2	(United States) Mark Keil (United States) T. J. Middleton	6	6
**(Armenia) Sargis Sargsian** **(United States) Greg Van Emburgh**	**7**	**7**
WC	(Canada) Hugues Laverdière (Canada) Charles-Antoine Sévigny	2	0
3	**(United States) Patrick Galbraith** **(United States) Todd Martin**	**6**	**6**

Qualifying competition
**(Armenia) Sargis Sargsian** **(United States) Greg Van Emburgh**	**6**	**6**
3	(United States) Patrick Galbraith (United States) Todd Martin	2	4
