= 1998 Italian Open (tennis) =

- Date: 4–10 May (women); 11–17 May (men)
- Edition: 55th
- Surface: Clay / outdoor
- Location: Rome, Italy
- Venue: Foro Italico

Champions

Men's singles
- (Chile) Marcelo Ríos

Women's singles
- (Switzerland) Martina Hingis

Men's doubles
- (India) Mahesh Bhupathi / (India) Leander Paes

Women's doubles
- (Spain) Virginia Ruano Pascual / (Argentina) Paola Suárez
← 1997 ·	Italian Open	· 1999 →

The 1998 Italian Open was a tennis tournament played on outdoor clay courts. It was the 57th edition of the Rome Masters and was part of the Super 9 of the 1998 ATP Tour and of Tier I of the 1998 WTA Tour. Both the men's and women's events took place at the Foro Italico in Rome, Italy. The women's tournament was played from 4 May until 10 May 1998, the men's tournament was played from 11 May to 17 May 1998. Marcelo Ríos and Martina Hingis won the singles titles.

== Finals ==
=== Men's singles ===
(Chile) Marcelo Ríos defeated (Spain) Albert Costa by walkover

- It was Ríos' 4th singles title of the year and the 9th of his career.

=== Women's singles ===
(Switzerland) Martina Hingis defeated (United States) Venus Williams, 6–3, 2–6, 6–3

- It was Hingis' 4th singles title of the year and the 18th of her career.

=== Men's doubles ===
(India) Mahesh Bhupathi / (India) Leander Paes defeated (South Africa) Ellis Ferreira / (United States) Rick Leach, 6–4, 4–6, 7–6

- It was Bhupathi's 4th title of the year and the 10th of his career. It was Paes' 4th title of the year and the 10th of his career.

=== Women's doubles ===
(Spain) Virginia Ruano Pascual / (Argentina) Paola Suárez defeated (South Africa) Amanda Coetzer / (Spain) Arantxa Sánchez-Vicario, 7–6^{(7–1)}, 6–4

- It was Ruano Pascual's 4th title of the year and the 5th of her career. It was Suárez's 5th title of the year and the 6th of her career.
