= 1998 du Maurier Open =

- Date: August 3–9 (men); August 17–23 (women)
- Edition: 109th
- Surface: Hard / outdoor

Champions

Men's singles
- (Australia) Patrick Rafter

Women's singles
- (United States) Monica Seles

Men's doubles
- (Czech Republic) Martin Damm / (United States) Jim Grabb

Women's doubles
- (Switzerland) Martina Hingis / (Czech Republic) Jana Novotná
- Canadian Open

The 1998 du Maurier Open was a tennis tournament played on outdoor hard courts. It was the 109th edition of the Canada Masters and was part of the Super 9 of the 1998 ATP Tour and of Tier I of the 1998 WTA Tour. The men's event took place at the National Tennis Centre in Toronto in Canada from August 3 through August 10, 1998, while the women's event took place at the du Maurier Stadium in Montreal in Canada from August 17 through August 23, 1998.

== Finals ==
=== Men's singles ===
(Australia) Patrick Rafter defeated (Netherlands) Richard Krajicek 7–6^{(7–3)}, 6–4

- It was Rafter's 4th title of the year and the 11th of his career. It was his 1st career Masters title.

=== Women's singles ===
(United States) Monica Seles defeated (Spain) Arantxa Sánchez-Vicario 6–3, 6–2

- It was Seles' 1st title of the year and the 47th of her career. It was her 1st Tier I title of the year and her 8th overall.

=== Men's doubles ===
(Czech Republic) Martin Damm / (United States) Jim Grabb defeated (South Africa) Ellis Ferreira / (United States) Rick Leach 6–7, 6–2, 7–6

- It was Damm's 3rd title of the year and the 14th of his career. It was Grabb's 3rd title of the year and the 25th of his career.

=== Women's doubles ===
(Switzerland) Martina Hingis / (Czech Republic) Jana Novotná defeated (Indonesia) Yayuk Basuki / (Netherlands) Caroline Vis 6–3, 6–4

- It was Hingis' 12th title of the year and the 37th of her career. It was Novotná's 9th title of the year and the 102nd of her career.
