= 1997 Kremlin Cup – Women's doubles =

Women's doubles
- 1997 Kremlin Cup

Final
- Champions: (Spain) Arantxa Sánchez Vicario (Belarus) Natasha Zvereva
- Runners-up: (Indonesia) Yayuk Basuki (Netherlands) Caroline Vis
- Score: 5–3 (default)

Details
- Draw: 16
- Seeds: 4

Events
Singles	men	women
Doubles	men	women
← 1996 ·	Kremlin Cup	· 1998 →

Natalia Medvedeva and Larisa Savchenko were the defending champions but only Savchenko competed that year with Helena Suková.

Savchenko and Suková lost in the semifinals to Arantxa Sánchez Vicario and Natasha Zvereva.

Sánchez Vicario and Zvereva won the final 5–3 after Yayuk Basuki and Caroline Vis were defaulted.

== Seeds ==
Champion seeds are indicated in bold text while text in italics indicates the round in which those seeds were eliminated.

1. (Spain) **Arantxa Sánchez Vicario** / (Belarus) **Natasha Zvereva (champions)**
2. (Indonesia) Yayuk Basuki / (Netherlands) Caroline Vis (final)
3. (Latvia) Larisa Savchenko / (Czech Republic) Helena Suková (semifinals)
4. (Spain) Conchita Martínez / (Argentina) Patricia Tarabini (quarterfinals)

== Draw ==
=== Key ===
- Q = Qualifier
- WC = Wild card
- LL = Lucky loser
- Alt = Alternate
- ITF = ITF entry
- PR = Protected ranking
- SR = Special ranking
- SE = Special exempt
- JE = Junior exempt
- JR = Junior Accelerator Programme entrant
- CO = College Accelerator Programme entrant
- NG = Next Gen Accelerator Program entrant
- w/o = Walkover
- r = Retired
- d = Defaulted

First round
1	(Spain) **A Sánchez Vicario** (Belarus) **N Zvereva**	**6**	**6**
(Ukraine) O Lugina (Czech Republic) E Melicharová	1	0
(Italy) **S Farina** (Italy) **R Grande**	**6**	**6**
Q	(Bulgaria) M Maleeva (Spain) M Serna	4	4
3	(Latvia) **L Savchenko** (Czech Republic) **H Suková**	**6**	**6**
(Sweden) Å Carlsson (Switzerland) P Schnyder	2	1
(Slovakia) **H Nagyová** (Italy) **F Perfetti**	**6**	**7**
(Slovakia) K Habšudová (Argentina) F Labat	3	6
(United States) **K Po** (Japan) **A Sugiyama**	**6**	4	**6**
(Russia) E Likhovtseva (Romania) I Spîrlea	1	**6**	2
(Germany) Adriana Barna (Germany) Anca Barna	**6**	1	1
4	(Spain) **C Martínez** (Argentina) **P Tarabini**	4	**6**	**6**
(Russia) M Goloviznina (Russia) E Kulikovskaya	2	3
(Hungary) **V Csurgo** (Ukraine) **E Tatarkova**	**6**	**6**
WC	(Czech Republic) S Kleinová (Russia) E Makarova	2	1
2	(Indonesia) **Y Basuki** (Netherlands) **C Vis**	**6**	**6**

Quarterfinals
1	(Spain) **A Sánchez Vicario** (Belarus) **N Zvereva**	**7**	**6**
(Italy) S Farina (Italy) R Grande	5	3
3	(Latvia) **L Savchenko** (Czech Republic) **H Suková**	**6**	**6**
(Slovakia) H Nagyová (Italy) F Perfetti	2	2
(United States) **K Po** (Japan) **A Sugiyama**	**6**	**7**
4	(Spain) C Martínez (Argentina) P Tarabini	3	5
(Hungary) V Csurgo (Ukraine) E Tatarkova	4	**6**	6
2	(Indonesia) **Y Basuki** (Netherlands) **C Vis**	**6**	3	**7**

Semifinals
1	(Spain) **A Sánchez Vicario** (Belarus) **N Zvereva**	**7**	**7**
3	(Latvia) L Savchenko (Czech Republic) H Suková	6	6
(United States) K Po (Japan) A Sugiyama	**6**	3	4
2	(Indonesia) **Y Basuki** (Netherlands) **C Vis**	1	**6**	**6**

Final
1	(Spain) **Arantxa Sánchez Vicario** (Belarus) **Natasha Zvereva**	**5**
2	(Indonesia) Yayuk Basuki (Netherlands) Caroline Vis	3	d
