= 1997 Kremlin Cup =

- Date: 3–9 November (men); 27 October – 2 November (women)
- Edition: 8th (men) / 2nd (women)
- Surface: Carpet / indoor
- Location: Moscow, Russia
- Venue: Olympic Stadium

Champions

Men's singles
- (Russia) Yevgeny Kafelnikov

Women's singles
- (Czech Republic) Jana Novotná

Men's doubles
- (Czech Republic) Martin Damm / (Czech Republic) Cyril Suk

Women's doubles
- (Spain) Arantxa Sánchez Vicario / (Belarus) Natasha Zvereva
| ← 1996 · | Kremlin Cup | · 1998 → |

The 1997 Kremlin Cup was a tennis tournament played on indoor carpet courts at the Olympic Stadium in Moscow in Russia that was part of the World Series of the 1997 ATP Tour and of Tier I of the 1997 WTA Tour. The men's tournament was held from 3 November through 9 November 1997 while the women's tournament was held from 27 October through 2 November 1997. Yevgeny Kafelnikov and Jana Novotná won the singles titles.

== Finals ==
=== Men's singles ===
(Russia) Yevgeny Kafelnikov defeated (Czech Republic) Petr Korda 7–6^{(7–2)}, 6–4

- It was Kafelnikov's 3rd title of the year and the 14th of his career.

=== Women's singles ===
(Czech Republic) Jana Novotná defeated (Japan) Ai Sugiyama 6–3, 6–4

- It was Novotná's 3rd title of the year and the 18th of her career.

=== Men's doubles ===
(Czech Republic) Martin Damm / (Czech Republic) Cyril Suk defeated (South Africa) David Adams / (France) Fabrice Santoro 6–4, 6–3

- It was Damm's 3rd title of the year and the 11th of his career. It was Suk's only title of the year and the 17th of his career.

=== Women's doubles ===
(Spain) Arantxa Sánchez Vicario / (Belarus) Natasha Zvereva defeated (Indonesia) Yayuk Basuki / (Netherlands) Caroline Vis 5–3 (Basuki and Vis defaulted)

- It was Sánchez Vicario's 7th title of the year and the 56th of her career. It was Zvereva's 8th title of the year and the 67th of her career.
