= 1997 Kremlin Cup – Women's singles =

Women's singles
- 1997 Kremlin Cup

Final
- Champion: (Czech Republic) Jana Novotná
- Runner-up: (Japan) Ai Sugiyama
- Score: 6–3, 6–4

Details
- Draw: 28
- Seeds: 8

Events
Singles	men	women
Doubles	men	women
← 1996 ·	Kremlin Cup	· 1998 →

Jana Novotná defeated Ai Sugiyama in the final, 6–3, 6–4 to win the women's singles tennis title at the 1997 Kremlin Cup.

Conchita Martínez was the defending champion, but lost in the semifinals to Novotná.

== Seeds ==
A champion seed is indicated in bold text while text in italics indicates the round in which that seed was eliminated. The top four seeds received a bye to the second round.

1. (Czech Republic) **Jana Novotná (champion)**
2. (Romania) Irina Spîrlea (quarterfinals)
3. (Spain) Arantxa Sánchez Vicario (quarterfinals)
4. (Spain) Conchita Martínez (semifinals)
5. (Germany) Anke Huber (first round)
6. (France) Sandrine Testud (quarterfinals)
7. (Netherlands) Brenda Schultz-McCarthy (second round)
8. (Belgium) Sabine Appelmans (first round)

== Draw ==
=== Key ===
- Q = Qualifier
- WC = Wild card
- LL = Lucky loser
- Alt = Alternate
- ITF = ITF entry
- PR = Protected ranking
- SR = Special ranking
- SE = Special exempt
- JE = Junior exempt
- JR = Junior Accelerator Programme entrant
- CO = College Accelerator Programme entrant
- NG = Next Gen Accelerator Program entrant
- w/o = Walkover
- r = Retired
- d = Defaulted

=== Final ===
Semifinals
1	(Czech Republic) **Jana Novotná**	**6**	**6**
4	(Spain) Conchita Martínez	4	1
(Japan) **Ai Sugiyama**	**6**	4	**6**
(Belgium) Dominique Van Roost	2	**6**	3

Final
1	(Czech Republic) **Jana Novotná**	**6**	**6**
(Japan) Ai Sugiyama	3	4

=== Section 1 ===
First round
Q	(United States) S Williams	3	6^{6}
(United States) **K Po**	**6**	**7^{8}**
(United States) **V Williams**	**7^{7}**	**6**
(Russia) E Likhovtseva	6^{3}	3
Q	(Italy) **S Farina**	3	**7^{7}**	**6**
8	(Belgium) S Appelmans	**6**	6^{4}	1
(Switzerland) **P Schnyder**	**6**	**6**
Q	(Russia) E Dementieva	2	1
(Bulgaria) M Maleeva	1	3
(Slovakia) **K Habšudová**	**6**	**6**
(South Africa) J Kruger	3	6^{4}
6	(France) **S Testud**	**6**	**7^{7}**

Second round
1	(Czech Republic) **J Novotná**	**6**	**6**
(United States) K Po	0	2
(United States) **V Williams**	**6**	**6**
Q	(Italy) S Farina	4	0
4	(Spain) **C Martínez**	**7**	2	**6**
(Switzerland) P Schnyder	5	**6**	1
(Slovakia) K Habšudová	2	**6**	6^{3}
6	(France) **S Testud**	**6**	3	**7^{7}**

Quarterfinals
1	(Czech Republic) **J Novotná**	**7**	**6**
(United States) V Williams	5	4
4	(Spain) **C Martínez**	**6**	**6**
6	(France) S Testud	1	4

Semifinals
1	(Czech Republic) **J Novotná**	**6**	**6**
4	(Spain) C Martínez	4	1

=== Section 2 ===
First round
7	(Netherlands) **B Schultz-McCarthy**	**7**	**6**
(Austria) B Paulus	5	3
(Belarus) N Zvereva	4	6^{3}
(Japan) **A Sugiyama**	**6**	**7^{7}**
(Indonesia) Y Basuki	4^{r}
WC	(Russia) **E Makarova**	5
5	(Germany) A Huber	**7**	4	3
(Belgium) **D Van Roost**	5	**6**	**6**
Q	(Croatia) M Lučić	2	4
(Czech Republic) **H Suková**	**6**	**6**
WC	(Latvia) **L Savchenko**	3	**6**	**6**
(Argentina) F Labat	**6**	3	1

Second round
7	(Netherlands) B Schultz-McCarthy	4	5
(Japan) **A Sugiyama**	**6**	**7**
WC	(Russia) E Makarova	3	0
3	(Spain) **A Sánchez Vicario**	**6**	**6**
(Belgium) **D Van Roost**	**6**	**7^{8}**
(Czech Republic) H Suková	2	6^{6}
WC	(Latvia) L Savchenko	4	6^{10}
2	(Romania) **I Spîrlea**	**6**	**7^{12}**

Quarterfinals
(Japan) **A Sugiyama**	**6**	**7^{7}**
3	(Spain) A Sánchez Vicario	1	6^{1}
(Belgium) **D Van Roost**	**6**	**6**
2	(Romania) I Spîrlea	2	4

Semifinals
(Japan) **A Sugiyama**	**6**	4	**6**
(Belgium) D Van Roost	2	**6**	3
