= 1996 Kremlin Cup – Women's singles =

Women's singles
- 1996 Kremlin Cup

Final
- Champion: (Spain) Conchita Martínez
- Runner-up: (Austria) Barbara Paulus
- Score: 6–1, 4–6, 6–4

Details
- Seeds: 8

Events
Singles	men	women
Doubles	men	women
← 1995 ·	Kremlin Cup	· 1997 →

This was the first edition of the tournament.

Conchita Martínez won the title, defeating Barbara Paulus in the final 6–1, 4–6, 6–4.

== Seeds ==
A champion seed is indicated in bold text while text in italics indicates the round in which that seed was eliminated. The top two seeds received a bye to the second round.

1. (Spain) **Conchita Martínez (champion)**
2. (Austria) Barbara Paulus (final)
3. (South Africa) Amanda Coetzer (first round)
4. (Belgium) Sabine Appelmans (semifinals)
5. (Romania) Ruxandra Dragomir (quarterfinals)
6. (Italy) Silvia Farina (first round)
7. (Austria) Barbara Schett (semifinals)
8. (Slovakia) Katarína Studeníková (quarterfinals)

== Draw ==
=== Key ===
- Q = Qualifier
- WC = Wild card
- LL = Lucky loser
- Alt = Alternate
- SE = Special exempt
- PR = Protected ranking
- ITF = ITF entry
- JE = Junior exempt
- w/o = Walkover
- r = Retired
- d = Defaulted
- SR = Special ranking

=== Final ===
Semifinals
1	(Spain) **Conchita Martínez**	4	**6**	**6**
4	(Belgium) Sabine Appelmans	**6**	4	4
7	(Austria) Barbara Schett	3	**7**	3
2	(Austria) **Barbara Paulus**	**6**	5	**6**

Final
1	(Spain) **Conchita Martínez**	**6**	4	**6**
2	(Austria) Barbara Paulus	1	**6**	4

=== Section 1 ===
First round
(Austria) **S Dopfer**	**6**	**6**
(South Korea) S-H Park	1	4
(Germany) P Begerow	3	5
(Netherlands) **K Boogert**	**6**	**7**
WC	(Georgia (country)) L Meskhi	1	1
8	(Slovakia) **K Studeníková**	**6**	**6**
4	(Belgium) **S Appelmans**	**6**	**6**
(Poland) A Olsza	2	1
(Latvia) L Savchenko	5	3
Q	(France) **S Pitkowski**	**7**	**6**
(Poland) **M Grzybowska**	**6**	**6**
LL	(France) N Dechy	3	4
(Slovakia) H Nagyová	1	5
5	(Romania) **R Dragomir**	**6**	**7**

Second round
1	(Spain) **C Martínez**	**6**	**6**
(Austria) S Dopfer	3	3
(Netherlands) K Boogert	5	**6**	5
8	(Slovakia) **K Studeníková**	**7**	4	**7**
4	(Belgium) **S Appelmans**	**6**	**7^{7}**
Q	(France) S Pitkowski	4	6^{1}
(Poland) M Grzybowska	2	6^{2}
5	(Romania) **R Dragomir**	**6**	**7^{7}**

Quarterfinals
1	(Spain) **C Martínez**	**6**	**6**
8	(Slovakia) K Studeníková	3	1
4	(Belgium) **S Appelmans**	**6**	**6**
5	(Romania) R Dragomir	1	3

Semifinals
1	(Spain) **C Martínez**	4	**6**	**6**
4	(Belgium) S Appelmans	**6**	4	4

=== Section 2 ===
First round
7	(Austria) **B Schett**	**6**	**6**
(Italy) R Grande	4	4
(Sweden) **Å Carlsson**	**6**	**7**
(Spain) G León García	4	5
WC	(Russia) E Kulikovskaya	3	4
Q	(Ukraine) **E Tatarkova**	**6**	**6**
Q	(Russia) **T Panova**	**6**	**6**
3	(South Africa) A Coetzer	4	4
6	(Italy) S Farina	**7**	4	2
(Russia) **E Makarova**	5	**6**	**6**
(Switzerland) **P Schnyder**	4	**6**	**6**
Q	(Japan) K Nagatsuka	**6**	1	2
(Russia) **A Kournikova**	**6**	**6**
(Bulgaria) E Pampoulova	0	4

Second round
7	(Austria) **B Schett**	1	**6**	**6**
(Sweden) Å Carlsson	**6**	0	4
Q	(Ukraine) **E Tatarkova**	**7^{8}**	**6**
Q	(Russia) T Panova	6^{6}	0
(Russia) **E Makarova**	**6**	**6**
(Switzerland) P Schnyder	3	1
(Russia) A Kournikova	4	3
2	(Austria) **B Paulus**	**6**	**6**

Quarterfinals
7	(Austria) **B Schett**	**6**	**6**
Q	(Ukraine) E Tatarkova	0	2
(Russia) E Makarova	2	**7**	0
2	(Austria) **B Paulus**	**6**	5	**6**

Semifinals
7	(Austria) B Schett	3	**7**	3
2	(Austria) **B Paulus**	**6**	5	**6**
