= 1998 Kremlin Cup – Men's singles =

Men's singles
- 1998 Kremlin Cup

Final
- Champion: (Russia) Yevgeny Kafelnikov
- Runner-up: (Croatia) Goran Ivanišević
- Score: 7–6^{(7–2)}, 7–6^{(7–5)}

Details
- Draw: 32 (4 Q / 2 WC )
- Seeds: 8

Events
Singles	men	women
Doubles	men	women
← 1997 ·	Kremlin Cup	· 1999 →

Yevgeny Kafelnikov was the defending champion and won in the final 7–6^{(7–2)}, 7–6^{(7–5)} against Goran Ivanišević.

== Seeds ==
1. (Spain) Àlex Corretja (second round)
2. (Russia) Yevgeny Kafelnikov (champions)
3. (Croatia) Goran Ivanišević (final)
4. (Zimbabwe) Byron Black (second round)
5. (Czech Republic) Bohdan Ulihrach (first round)
6. (Switzerland) Marc Rosset (semifinal, retired)
7. (Czech Republic) Daniel Vacek (first round)
8. (Russia) Marat Safin (first round)

== Draw ==
=== Key ===
- Q = Qualifier
- WC = Wild card
- LL = Lucky loser
- Alt = Alternate
- SE = Special exempt
- PR = Protected ranking
- ITF = ITF entry
- JE = Junior exempt
- w/o = Walkover
- r = Retired
- d = Defaulted
- SR = Special ranking

=== Finals ===
Semifinals
(France) Arnaud Clément	5	2
3	(Croatia) Goran Ivanišević	7	6
6	(Switzerland) Marc Rosset	1	0^{r}
2	(Russia) Yevgeny Kafelnikov	6	2

Final
3	(Croatia) Goran Ivanišević	6^{2}	6^{5}
2	(Russia) Yevgeny Kafelnikov	7^{7}	7^{7}

=== Top half ===
First round
1	(Spain) À Corretja	6	7^{7}
(Netherlands) J van Lottum	3	6^{2}
(Canada) S Lareau	6	5	6
(France) L Roux	3	7	2
Q	(United States) J Palmer	3	3
(France) A Clément	6	6
Q	(Netherlands) R Sluiter	6	6
7	(Czech Republic) D Vacek	2	4
3	(Croatia) G Ivanišević	7^{7}	7^{7}
Q	(Germany) C Arriens	6^{5}	6^{3}
(France) J Golmard	7	6
(Germany) D Prinosil	5	3
(Netherlands) S Schalken	7	6
WC	(Russia) A Olhovskiy	5	4
Q	(Germany) L Burgsmüller	6	6
5	(Czech Republic) B Ulihrach	4	2

Second round
1	(Spain) À Corretja	3	3
(Canada) S Lareau	6	6
(France) A Clément	6	7^{7}
Q	(Netherlands) R Sluiter	4	6^{5}
3	(Croatia) G Ivanišević	6	3
(France) J Golmard	3	2^{r}
(Netherlands) S Schalken	3	7	5
Q	(Germany) L Burgsmüller	6	5	7

Quarterfinals
(Canada) S Lareau	3	5
(France) A Clément	6	7
3	(Croatia) G Ivanišević	6	6
Q	(Germany) L Burgsmüller	2	1

Semifinals
(France) A Clément	5	2
3	(Croatia) G Ivanišević	7	6

=== Bottom half ===
First round
6	(Switzerland) M Rosset	6	6
(United States) J Tarango	4	4
(Australia) T Woodbridge	6^{4}	2
(Romania) A Pavel	7^{7}	6
(Germany) O Gross	1	3
LL	(Slovakia) J Krošlák	6	6
(Czech Republic) M Damm	2	3
4	(Zimbabwe) B Black	6	6
8	(Russia) M Safin	3	4
(Netherlands) P Haarhuis	6	6
(Ukraine) A Medvedev	6^{5}	4
(France) G Raoux	7^{7}	6
(France) S Grosjean	6	3	7
(Zimbabwe) W Black	2	6	5
WC	(Russia) A Cherkasov	3	4
2	(Russia) Y Kafelnikov	6	6

Second round
6	(Switzerland) M Rosset	6	6
(Romania) A Pavel	4	2
LL	(Slovakia) J Krošlák	6	6
4	(Zimbabwe) B Black	4	4
(Netherlands) P Haarhuis	2	5
(France) G Raoux	6	7
(France) S Grosjean	6	3	2
2	(Russia) Y Kafelnikov	2	6	6

Quarterfinals
6	(Switzerland) M Rosset	6	6
LL	(Slovakia) J Krošlák	2	4
(France) G Raoux	1	1
2	(Russia) Y Kafelnikov	6	6

Semifinals
6	(Switzerland) M Rosset	1	0^{r}
2	(Russia) Y Kafelnikov	6	2
