= 1998 Kremlin Cup – Men's doubles =

Men's doubles
- 1998 Kremlin Cup

Final
- Champions: (United States) Jared Palmer (United States) Jeff Tarango
- Runners-up: (Russia) Yevgeny Kafelnikov (Czech Republic) Daniel Vacek
- Score: 6–4, 6–7, 6–2

Details
- Draw: 16
- Seeds: 4

Events
Singles	men	women
Doubles	men	women
← 1997 ·	Kremlin Cup	· 1999 →

Martin Damm and Cyril Suk were the defending champions, but lost in the semifinals this year.

Jared Palmer and Jeff Tarango won the title, defeating Yevgeny Kafelnikov and Daniel Vacek 6–4, 6–7, 6–2 in the final.

== Seeds ==
1. (Netherlands) Paul Haarhuis / (The Bahamas) Mark Knowles (quarterfinals)
2. (Czech Republic) Martin Damm / (Czech Republic) Cyril Suk (semifinals)
3. (United States) Jim Grabb / (Australia) Sandon Stolle (quarterfinals)
4. (Canada) Sébastien Lareau / (United States) Alex O'Brien (semifinals)

== Draw ==
=== Key ===
- Q = Qualifier
- WC = Wild card
- LL = Lucky loser
- Alt = Alternate
- ITF = ITF entry
- PR = Protected ranking
- SR = Special ranking
- SE = Special exempt
- JE = Junior exempt
- JR = Junior Accelerator Programme entrant
- CO = College Accelerator Programme entrant
- NG = Next Gen Accelerator Program entrant
- w/o = Walkover
- r = Retired
- d = Defaulted

=== Draw ===
First round
1	(Netherlands) P Haarhuis (The Bahamas) M Knowles	7	7
(South Africa) R Koenig (Germany) D Prinosil	5	6
(United States) J Palmer (United States) J Tarango	6	3	6
(North Macedonia) A Kitinov (Czech Republic) T Anzari	2	6	3
4	(Canada) S Lareau (United States) A O'Brien	6	6
(Spain) T Carbonell (Spain) F Roig	1	2
WC	(Russia) A Olhovskiy (Russia) M Safin	6	7	4
Q	(Netherlands) S Schalken (Netherlands) J van Lottum	7	6	6
WC	(Russia) A Derepasko (Russia) K Ivanov-Smolensky	6	3	2
(Russia) Y Kafelnikov (Czech Republic) D Vacek	3	6	6
(South Africa) B Haygarth (Zimbabwe) K Ullyett	6	7	6
3	(United States) J Grabb (Australia) S Stolle	7	6	7
WC	(Ukraine) A Medvedev (Belarus) V Voltchkov	6	7
(Zimbabwe) B Black (South Africa) P Norval	4	6
(United States) J Gimelstob (Belarus) M Mirnyi	3	1
2	(Czech Republic) M Damm (Czech Republic) C Suk	6	6

Quarterfinals
1	(Netherlands) P Haarhuis (The Bahamas) M Knowles	6	1	5
(United States) J Palmer (United States) J Tarango	4	6	7
4	(Canada) S Lareau (United States) A O'Brien	7	6
Q	(Netherlands) S Schalken (Netherlands) J van Lottum	6	3
(Russia) Y Kafelnikov (Czech Republic) D Vacek	4	6	7
3	(United States) J Grabb (Australia) S Stolle	6	3	5
WC	(Ukraine) A Medvedev (Belarus) V Voltchkov	6	6	3
2	(Czech Republic) M Damm (Czech Republic) C Suk	4	7	6

Semifinals
(United States) J Palmer (United States) J Tarango	2	6	6
4	(Canada) S Lareau (United States) A O'Brien	6	1	4
(Russia) Y Kafelnikov (Czech Republic) D Vacek	7	1	6
2	(Czech Republic) M Damm (Czech Republic) C Suk	6	6	3

Final
(United States) J Palmer (United States) J Tarango	6	6	6
(Russia) Y Kafelnikov (Czech Republic) D Vacek	4	7	2
