= 1996 Kremlin Cup – Men's doubles =

Men's doubles
- 1996 Kremlin Cup

Final
- Champions: (United States) Rick Leach (Russia) Andrei Olhovskiy
- Runners-up: (Czech Republic) Jiří Novák (Czech Republic) David Rikl
- Score: 4–6, 6–1, 6–2

Details
- Draw: 16
- Seeds: 4

Events
Singles	men	women
Doubles	men	women
← 1995 ·	Kremlin Cup	· 1997 →

Byron Black and Jared Palmer were the defending champions but only Black competed that year with Grant Connell.

Black and Connell lost in the first round to Max Mirnyi and Kevin Ullyett.

Rick Leach and Andrei Olhovskiy won in the final 4–6, 6–1, 6–2 against Jiří Novák and David Rikl.

== Seeds ==
1. (Zimbabwe) Byron Black / (Canada) Grant Connell (first round)
2. (Russia) Yevgeny Kafelnikov / (Czech Republic) Daniel Vacek (quarterfinals)
3. (Canada) Sébastien Lareau / (United States) Alex O'Brien (quarterfinals)
4. (Belgium) Libor Pimek / (South Africa) Byron Talbot (first round)

== Draw ==
=== Key ===
- Q = Qualifier
- WC = Wild card
- LL = Lucky loser
- Alt = Alternate
- ITF = ITF entry
- PR = Protected ranking
- SR = Special ranking
- SE = Special exempt
- JE = Junior exempt
- JR = Junior Accelerator Programme entrant
- CO = College Accelerator Programme entrant
- NG = Next Gen Accelerator Program entrant
- w/o = Walkover
- r = Retired
- d = Defaulted

First round
1	(Zimbabwe) B Black (Canada) G Connell	5	7	4
Q	(Belarus) M Mirnyi (South Africa) K Ullyett	7	6	6
WC	(Switzerland) J Hlasek (Switzerland) M Rosset	6	6	4
(United States) R Leach (Russia) A Olhovskiy	3	7	6
4	(Belgium) L Pimek (South Africa) B Talbot	6	4
(Czech Republic) M Damm (Czech Republic) P Vízner	7	6
(Netherlands) H J Davids (Netherlands) S Schalken	7	7
(United Kingdom) N Broad (South Africa) P Norval	6	6
(Spain) T Carbonell (Spain) F Roig	6	4	4
(Czech Republic) P Korda (Czech Republic) C Suk	2	6	6
WC	(United States) J Courier (Spain) J Sánchez	1	4
3	(Canada) S Lareau (United States) A O'Brien	6	6
(South Africa) D Adams (Netherlands) M Oosting	4	4
(Czech Republic) J Novák (Czech Republic) D Rikl	6	6
WC	(Russia) A Cherkasov (Armenia) S Sargsian	3	6
2	(Russia) Y Kafelnikov (Czech Republic) D Vacek	6	7

Quarterfinals
Q	(Belarus) M Mirnyi (South Africa) K Ullyett	6	3
(United States) R Leach (Russia) A Olhovskiy	7	6
(Czech Republic) M Damm (Czech Republic) P Vízner	6	6
(Netherlands) H J Davids (Netherlands) S Schalken	1	4
(Czech Republic) P Korda (Czech Republic) C Suk	3	6	6
3	(Canada) S Lareau (United States) A O'Brien	6	1	1
(Czech Republic) J Novák (Czech Republic) D Rikl	w/o
2	(Russia) Y Kafelnikov (Czech Republic) D Vacek

Semifinals
(United States) R Leach (Russia) A Olhovskiy	7	6
(Czech Republic) M Damm (Czech Republic) P Vízner	5	3
(Czech Republic) P Korda (Czech Republic) C Suk
(Czech Republic) J Novák (Czech Republic) D Rikl	w/o

Final
(United States) R Leach (Russia) A Olhovskiy	4	6	6
(Czech Republic) J Novák (Czech Republic) D Rikl	6	1	2
