= 1997 Kremlin Cup – Men's singles =

Men's singles
- 1997 Kremlin Cup

Final
- Champion: (Russia) Yevgeny Kafelnikov
- Runner-up: (Czech Republic) Petr Korda
- Score: 7–6^{(7–2)}, 6–4

Details
- Draw: 32 (4 Q / 1 WC )
- Seeds: 8

Events
| Singles | men | women |
| Doubles | men | women |
| ← 1996 · | Kremlin Cup | · 1998 → |

Goran Ivanišević was the defending champion, but did not compete that year.
Yevgeny Kafelnikov won in the final 7–6^{(7–2)}, 6–4 against Petr Korda.

== Seeds ==
1. (Russia) Yevgeny Kafelnikov (champions)
2. (Czech Republic) Petr Korda (final)
3. (Spain) Sergi Bruguera (first round)
4. (Brazil) Gustavo Kuerten (second round)
5. (Spain) Félix Mantilla (first round)
6. (Switzerland) Marc Rosset (first round)
7. (France) Fabrice Santoro (first round)
8. (Germany) Nicolas Kiefer (first round)

== Draw ==
=== Key ===
- Q = Qualifier
- WC = Wild card
- LL = Lucky loser
- Alt = Alternate
- SE = Special exempt
- PR = Protected ranking
- ITF = ITF entry
- JE = Junior exempt
- w/o = Walkover
- r = Retired
- d = Defaulted
- SR = Special ranking

=== Finals ===
Semifinals
1 | (Russia) Yevgeny Kafelnikov | 6 | 6
Q | (Canada) Daniel Nestor | 4 | 3
Q | (Zimbabwe) Wayne Black | 7^{7} | 3 | 5
2 | (Czech Republic) Petr Korda | 6^{4} | 6 | 7

Final
1 | (Russia) Yevgeny Kafelnikov | 7^{7} | 6
2 | (Czech Republic) Petr Korda | 6^{2} | 3

=== Top half ===
First round
1 | (Russia) Y Kafelnikov | 6^{5} | 6 | 6
(United States) J Stark | 7^{7} | 1 | 3
(Zimbabwe) B Black | 6 | 6
Q | (Czech Republic) P Luxa | 2 | 2
(Germany) A Rădulescu | 4 | 6 | 3
(Czech Republic) B Ulihrach | 6 | 3 | 6
(Armenia) S Sargsian | 6 | 2 | 6
7 | (France) F Santoro | 2 | 6 | 3
3 | (Spain) S Bruguera | 6 | 1 | 4
(Czech Republic) J Novák | 2 | 6 | 6
(Spain) A Portas | 6^{3} | 3
(Czech Republic) M Damm | 7^{7} | 6
(United States) J Gimelstob | 6 | 2 | 4
Q | (Canada) D Nestor | 4 | 6 | 6
(Spain) J Sánchez | 6 | 6^{4} | 7^{7}
6 | (Switzerland) M Rosset | 4 | 7^{7} | 6^{4}

Second round
1 | (Russia) Y Kafelnikov | 7^{7} | 6
(Zimbabwe) B Black | 6^{5} | 3
(Czech Republic) B Ulihrach
(Armenia) S Sargsian | w/o
(Czech Republic) J Novák | 6^{5} | 3
(Czech Republic) M Damm | 7^{7} | 6
Q | (Canada) D Nestor | 6 | 6
(Spain) J Sánchez | 4 | 4

Quarterfinals
1 | (Russia) Y Kafelnikov | 6 | 6
(Armenia) S Sargsian | 1 | 2
(Czech Republic) M Damm | 3 | 4
Q | (Canada) D Nestor | 6 | 6

Semifinals
1 | (Russia) Y Kafelnikov | 6 | 6
Q | (Canada) D Nestor | 4 | 3

=== Bottom half ===
First round
5 | (Spain) F Mantilla | 5 | 6^{3}
(Slovakia) J Krošlák | 7 | 7^{7}
(Netherlands) P Haarhuis | 7^{7} | 3 | 4
Q | (Zimbabwe) W Black | 6^{3} | 6 | 6
(Czech Republic) D Vacek | 6 | 6
(Germany) D Prinosil | 0 | 2
(Netherlands) S Schalken | 7^{7} | 6^{3} | 6^{3}
4 | (Brazil) G Kuerten | 6^{3} | 7^{7} | 7^{7}
8 | (Germany) N Kiefer | 5 | 3
(United States) A O'Brien | 7 | 6
WC | (Russia) A Volkov | 6 | 4 | 5
(Germany) H Dreekmann | 3 | 6 | 7
(Denmark) K Carlsen | 7 | 6^{4} | 7^{7}
Q | (Russia) M Safin | 5 | 7^{7} | 6^{4}
(United States) J Tarango | 6 | 5 | 3
2 | (Czech Republic) P Korda | 4 | 7 | 6

Second round
(Slovakia) J Krošlák | 1 | 6^{5}
Q | (Zimbabwe) W Black | 6 | 7^{7}
(Czech Republic) D Vacek | 6 | 6
4 | (Brazil) G Kuerten | 2 | 4
(United States) A O'Brien | 5 | 6 | 6
(Germany) H Dreekmann | 7 | 4 | 1
(Denmark) K Carlsen | 6^{6} | 7 | 4
2 | (Czech Republic) P Korda | 7^{8} | 5 | 6

Quarterfinals
Q | (Zimbabwe) W Black | 6 | 6
(Czech Republic) D Vacek | 1 | 2
(United States) A O'Brien | 5 | 3
2 | (Czech Republic) P Korda | 7 | 6

Semifinals
Q | (Zimbabwe) W Black | 7^{7} | 3 | 5
2 | (Czech Republic) P Korda | 6^{4} | 6 | 7
