= 1996 Kremlin Cup – Women's doubles =

Women's doubles
- 1996 Kremlin Cup

Final
- Champions: (Ukraine) Natalia Medvedeva (Latvia) Larisa Savchenko
- Runners-up: (Italy) Silvia Farina (Austria) Barbara Schett
- Score: 7–6^{(7–5)}, 4–6, 6–1

Details
- Seeds: 4

Events
Singles	men	women
Doubles	men	women
← 1995 ·	Kremlin Cup	· 1997 →

Natalia Medvedeva and Larisa Savchenko won in the final 7–6(7–5), 4–6, 6–1 against Silvia Farina and Barbara Schett.

== Seeds ==
Champion seeds are indicated in bold text while text in italics indicates the round in which those seeds were eliminated.

== Seeds ==
1. (Spain) Conchita Martínez / (Argentina) Patricia Tarabini (semifinals)
2. (Ukraine) **Natalia Medvedeva** / (Latvia) **Larisa Savchenko (champions)**
3. (Ukraine) Olga Lugina / (Bulgaria) Elena Pampoulova (quarterfinals)
4. (Italy) Rita Grande / (Russia) Elena Makarova (first round)

== Draw ==
=== Key ===
- Q = Qualifier
- WC = Wild card
- LL = Lucky loser
- Alt = Alternate
- SE = Special exempt
- PR = Protected ranking
- ITF = ITF entry
- JE = Junior exempt
- w/o = Walkover
- r = Retired
- d = Defaulted
- SR = Special ranking

First round
1	(Spain) **C Martínez** (Argentina) **P Tarabini**	6^{5}	**6**	**6**
(Sweden) Å Carlsson (Romania) R Dragomir	**7**	4	3
(Russia) J Lutrova (Ukraine) E Tatarkova	4	2
Q	(Germany) **P Begerow** (Austria) **S Dopfer**	**6**	**6**
4	(Italy) R Grande (Russia) E Makarova	1	1
(Italy) **S Farina** (Austria) **B Schett**	**6**	**6**
(Poland) M Grzybowska (Slovakia) K Studeníková	2	**7**	6^{5}
(Slovakia) **H Nagyová** (Poland) **A Olsza**	**6**	5	**7**
(South Africa) **A Coetzer** (Russia) **A Kournikova**	**6**	**6**
(Russia) N Egorova (Russia) O Ivanova	1	3
(France) N Dechy (France) S Pitkowski	0	3
3	(Ukraine) **O Lugina** (Bulgaria) **E Pampoulova**	**6**	**6**
(Bulgaria) K Maleeva (Switzerland) P Schnyder	**6**	3	6^{5}
WC	(Russia) **E Kulikovskaya** (Georgia (country)) **L Meskhi**	1	**6**	**7**
(Japan) K Nagatsuka (South Korea) S-H Park	3	3
2	(Ukraine) **N Medvedeva** (Latvia) **L Savchenko**	**6**	**6**

Quarterfinals
1	(Spain) **C Martínez** (Argentina) **P Tarabini**	**6**	**6**
Q	(Germany) P Begerow (Austria) S Dopfer	1	2
(Italy) **S Farina** (Austria) **B Schett**	**6**	**6**
(Slovakia) H Nagyová (Poland) A Olsza	3	3
(South Africa) **A Coetzer** (Russia) **A Kournikova**	**6**	**6**
3	(Ukraine) O Lugina (Bulgaria) E Pampoulova	4	2
WC	(Russia) E Kulikovskaya (Georgia (country)) L Meskhi	6^{4}	4
2	(Ukraine) **N Medvedeva** (Latvia) **L Savchenko**	**7**	**6**

Semifinals
1	(Spain) C Martínez (Argentina) P Tarabini	**6**	5	0
(Italy) **S Farina** (Austria) **B Schett**	3	**7**	**6**
(South Africa) A Coetzer (Russia) A Kournikova	**6**	3	2
2	(Ukraine) **N Medvedeva** (Latvia) **L Savchenko**	3	**6**	**6**

Final
(Italy) S Farina (Austria) B Schett	6^{5}	**6**	1
2	(Ukraine) **N Medvedeva** (Latvia) **L Savchenko**	**7**	4	**6**
