= 1996 Kremlin Cup – Men's singles =

Men's singles
- 1996 Kremlin Cup

Final
- Champion: (Croatia) Goran Ivanišević
- Runner-up: (Russia) Yevgeny Kafelnikov
- Score: 3–6, 6–1, 6–3

Details
- Draw: 32 (4 Q / 3 WC )
- Seeds: 8

Events
Singles	men	women
Doubles	men	women
← 1995 ·	Kremlin Cup	· 1997 →

Carl-Uwe Steeb was the defending champion but did not compete that year.

Goran Ivanišević won in the final 3–6, 6–1, 6–3 against Yevgeny Kafelnikov.

== Seeds ==
1. (Russia) Yevgeny Kafelnikov (final)
2. (Croatia) Goran Ivanišević (champion)
3. (United States) Jim Courier (second round)
4. (France) Cédric Pioline (first round)
5. (Spain) Àlex Corretja (first round)
6. (United States) MaliVai Washington (second round)
7. (Switzerland) Marc Rosset (second round)
8. (Spain) Carlos Moyá (second round)

== Draw ==
=== Key ===
- Q = Qualifier
- WC = Wild card
- LL = Lucky loser
- Alt = Alternate
- ITF = ITF entry
- PR = Protected ranking
- SR = Special ranking
- SE = Special exempt
- JE = Junior exempt
- JR = Junior Accelerator Programme entrant
- CO = College Accelerator Programme entrant
- NG = Next Gen Accelerator Program entrant
- w/o = Walkover
- r = Retired
- d = Defaulted

=== Finals ===
Semifinals
1	(Russia) Yevgeny Kafelnikov	7^{9}	6
(Germany) David Prinosil	6^{7}	4
(United States) Alex O'Brien	4	6^{1}
WC/2	(Croatia) Goran Ivanišević	6	7^{7}	4

Final
1	(Russia) Yevgeny Kafelnikov	6	1	3
WC/2	(Croatia) Goran Ivanišević	3	6	6

=== Top half ===
First round
1	(Russia) Y Kafelnikov	4	6	6
WC	(Russia) A Chesnokov	6	4	4
(Spain) F Clavet	6	6
Q	(Australia) S Draper	4	4
(United Kingdom) T Henman	2	6	4
(Zimbabwe) B Black	6	3	6
(Spain) J Burillo	6^{4}	7^{8}	4
7	(Switzerland) M Rosset	7^{7}	6^{6}	6
4	(France) C Pioline	4	6	2
(Czech Republic) M Damm	6	3	6
Q	(Slovakia) K Kučera	5	4
(Germany) D Prinosil	7	6
WC	(Russia) A Olhovskiy	6	5	6
(Czech Republic) J Novák	2	7	2
(Czech Republic) B Ulihrach	6^{4}	2
6	(United States) M Washington	7^{7}	6

Second round
1	(Russia) Y Kafelnikov	3	6	6
(Spain) F Clavet	6	4	2
(Zimbabwe) B Black	7^{7}	5	6
7	(Switzerland) M Rosset	6^{3}	7	2
(Czech Republic) M Damm	4	7^{7}	4
(Germany) D Prinosil	6	6^{5}	6
WC	(Russia) A Olhovskiy	7	6^{7}	7^{7}
6	(United States) M Washington	5	7^{9}	6^{4}

Quarterfinals
1	(Russia) Y Kafelnikov	7^{7}	6
(Zimbabwe) B Black	6^{2}	2
(Germany) D Prinosil	7	6
WC	(Russia) A Olhovskiy	5	2

Semifinals
1	(Russia) Y Kafelnikov	7^{9}	6
(Germany) D Prinosil	6^{7}	4

=== Bottom half ===
First round
5	(Spain) À Corretja	3	2
(United States) A O'Brien	6	6
(Romania) A Voinea	6^{4}	2
(France) G Forget	7^{7}	6
(Netherlands) S Schalken	6	6
Q	(Canada) S Lareau	4	4
(Spain) J Sánchez	4	3
3	(United States) J Courier	6	6
8	(Spain) C Moyá	4	7^{8}	6
(Italy) R Furlan	6	6^{6}	4
(Czech Republic) P Korda	7	6
Q	(Germany) M Sinner	5	4
(Switzerland) J Hlasek	7^{8}	6
(Spain) T Carbonell	6^{6}	2
(Czech Republic) D Vacek	4	6^{1}
WC/2	(Croatia) G Ivanišević	6	7^{7}

Second round
(United States) A O'Brien	7^{8}	7^{7}
(France) G Forget	6^{6}	6^{5}
(Netherlands) S Schalken	6	7^{7}
3	(United States) J Courier	4	6^{5}
8	(Spain) C Moyá	7	6^{1}	3
(Czech Republic) P Korda	5	7^{7}	6
(Switzerland) J Hlasek	2	1
WC/2	(Croatia) G Ivanišević	6	6

Quarterfinals
(United States) A O'Brien	6	7^{7}
(Netherlands) S Schalken	3	6^{4}
(Czech Republic) P Korda	5	0
WC/2	(Croatia) G Ivanišević	7	6

Semifinals
(United States) A O'Brien	4	6^{1}
WC/2	(Croatia) G Ivanišević	6	7^{7}
