= 1997 Kremlin Cup – Men's doubles =

Men's doubles
- 1997 Kremlin Cup

Final
- Champions: (Czech Republic) Martin Damm (Czech Republic) Cyril Suk
- Runners-up: (South Africa) David Adams (France) Fabrice Santoro
- Score: 6–4, 6–3

Details
- Draw: 16
- Seeds: 4

Events
Singles	men	women
Doubles	men	women
← 1996 ·	Kremlin Cup	· 1998 →

Rick Leach and Andrei Olhovskiy were the defending champions, but Olhovskiy did not participate this year. Leach partnered Jonathan Stark, losing in the first round.

Martin Damm and Cyril Suk won the title, defeating David Adams and Fabrice Santoro 6–4, 6–3 in the final.

== Seeds ==
1. (Netherlands) Jacco Eltingh / (Netherlands) Paul Haarhuis (semifinals)
2. (Russia) Yevgeny Kafelnikov / (Czech Republic) Daniel Vacek (semifinals)
3. (Canada) Sébastien Lareau / (United States) Alex O'Brien (first round)
4. (United States) Rick Leach / (United States) Jonathan Stark (first round)

== Draw ==
=== Key ===
- Q = Qualifier
- WC = Wild card
- LL = Lucky loser
- Alt = Alternate
- SE = Special exempt
- PR = Protected ranking
- ITF = ITF entry
- JE = Junior exempt
- w/o = Walkover
- r = Retired
- d = Defaulted
- SR = Special ranking

=== Draw ===
First round
1	(Netherlands) J Eltingh (Netherlands) P Haarhuis	6	7
WC	(Russia) A Volkov (Belarus) V Voltchkov	4	5
(Germany) K Braasch (Germany) D Prinosil	7	6
(Spain) J Sánchez (United States) J Tarango	6	4
4	(United States) R Leach (United States) J Stark	2	4
(Czech Republic) M Damm (Czech Republic) C Suk	6	6
(United Kingdom) N Broad (South Africa) P Norval	6	6	3
(Zimbabwe) B Black (Zimbabwe) W Black	3	7	6
(South Africa) D Adams (France) F Santoro	6	1	6
(United States) J Gimelstob (Brazil) G Kuerten	3	6	3
WC	(Russia) A Cherkasov (Belarus) M Mirnyi	7	6
3	(Canada) S Lareau (United States) A O'Brien	5	2
(Germany) M Commandeur (Russia) A Derepasko	1	6
Q	(United States) K Jones (Armenia) S Sargsian	6	7
(Czech Republic) J Novák (Czech Republic) D Rikl	3	6	4
2	(Russia) Y Kafelnikov (Czech Republic) D Vacek	6	3	6

Quarterfinals
1	(Netherlands) J Eltingh (Netherlands) P Haarhuis	6	6
(Germany) K Braasch (Germany) D Prinosil	3	4
(Czech Republic) M Damm (Czech Republic) C Suk	7	6
(Zimbabwe) B Black (Zimbabwe) W Black	6	2
(South Africa) D Adams (France) F Santoro	6	7	7
WC	(Russia) A Cherkasov (Belarus) M Mirnyi	7	5	6
Q	(United States) K Jones (Armenia) S Sargsian	3	4
2	(Russia) Y Kafelnikov (Czech Republic) D Vacek	6	6

Semifinals
1	(Netherlands) J Eltingh (Netherlands) P Haarhuis	4	6	6
(Czech Republic) M Damm (Czech Republic) C Suk	6	4	7
(South Africa) D Adams (France) F Santoro	2	7	6
2	(Russia) Y Kafelnikov (Czech Republic) D Vacek	6	6	0

Final
(Czech Republic) M Damm (Czech Republic) C Suk	6	6
(South Africa) D Adams (France) F Santoro	4	3
