= 1996 Kremlin Cup =

- Date: 4–10 November (men); 27 October – 3 November (women)
- Edition: 7th (men) / 1st (women)
- Surface: Carpet / indoor
- Location: Moscow, Russia
- Venue: Olympic Stadium

Champions

Men's singles
- (Croatia) Goran Ivanišević

Women's singles
- (Spain) Conchita Martínez

Men's doubles
- (United States) Rick Leach / (Russia) Andrei Olhovskiy

Women's doubles
- (Ukraine) Natalia Medvedeva / (Latvia) Larisa Neiland
← 1995 ·	Kremlin Cup	· 1997 →

The 1996 Kremlin Cup was a tennis tournament played on indoor carpet courts at the Olympic Stadium in Moscow in Russia that was part of the World Series of the 1996 ATP Tour and of Tier III of the 1996 WTA Tour. The men's tournament was held from 4 November through 10 November 1996 while the women's tournament was held from 27 October through 3 November 1996. Goran Ivanišević and Conchita Martínez won the singles titles.

== Finals ==
=== Men's singles ===
(Croatia) Goran Ivanišević defeated (Russia) Yevgeny Kafelnikov 3–6, 6–1, 6–3

- It was Ivanišević's 5th title of the year and the 17th of his career.

=== Women's singles ===
(Spain) Conchita Martínez defeated (Austria) Barbara Paulus 6–1, 4–6, 6–4

- It was Martínez's 2nd title of the year and the 28th of her career.

=== Men's doubles ===
(United States) Rick Leach / (Russia) Andrei Olhovskiy defeated (Czech Republic) Jiří Novák / (Czech Republic) David Rikl 4–6, 6–1, 6–2

- It was Leach's 4th title of the year and the 35th of his career. It was Olhovskiy's 4th title of the year and the 16th of his career.

=== Women's doubles ===
(Ukraine) Natalia Medvedeva / (Latvia) Larisa Neiland defeated (Italy) Silvia Farina / (Austria) Barbara Schett 7–6, 4–6, 6–1

- It was Medvedeva's 2nd title of the year and the 12th of her career. It was Neiland's 5th title of the year and the 58th of her career.
