= 1998 Kremlin Cup =

- Date: 9–15 November (men); 19–25 October (women)
- Edition: 9th (men) / 3rd (women)
- Surface: Carpet / indoor
- Location: Moscow, Russia
- Venue: Olympic Stadium

Champions

Men's singles
- (Russia) Yevgeny Kafelnikov

Women's singles
- (France) Mary Pierce

Men's doubles
- (United States) Jared Palmer / (United States) Jeff Tarango

Women's doubles
- (France) Mary Pierce / (Belarus) Natasha Zvereva
- Kremlin Cup

The 1998 Kremlin Cup was a tennis tournament played on indoor carpet courts at the Olympic Stadium in Moscow in Russia that was part of the World Series of the 1998 ATP Tour and of Tier I of the 1998 WTA Tour. The men's tournament was held from 9 November through 15 November 1998, while the women's tournament was held from 19 October through 25 October 1998. Yevgeny Kafelnikov and Mary Pierce won the singles titles.

== Finals ==
=== Men's singles ===
(Russia) Yevgeny Kafelnikov defeated (Croatia) Goran Ivanišević 7–6^{(7–2)}, 7–6^{(7–5)}

- It was Kafelnikov's 3rd title of the year and the 17th of his career.

=== Women's singles ===
(France) Mary Pierce defeated (United States) Monica Seles 7–6^{(7–2)}, 6–3

- It was Pierce's 3rd title of the year and the 11th of her career.

=== Men's doubles ===
(United States) Jared Palmer / (United States) Jeff Tarango defeated (Russia) Yevgeny Kafelnikov / (Czech Republic) Daniel Vacek 6–4, 6–7, 6–2

- It was Palmer's only title of the year and the 11th of his career. It was Tarango's only title of the year and the 6th of his career.

=== Women's doubles ===
(France) Mary Pierce / (Belarus) Natasha Zvereva defeated (United States) Lisa Raymond / (Australia) Rennae Stubbs 6–3, 6–4

- It was Pierce's 2nd title of the year and the 5th of her career. It was Zvereva's 7th title of the year and the 77th of her career.
