= 1998 Kremlin Cup – Women's singles =

Women's singles
- 1998 Kremlin Cup

Final
- Champion: (France) Mary Pierce
- Runner-up: (United States) Monica Seles
- Score: 7–6^{(7–2)}, 6–3

Details
- Seeds: 8

Events
| Singles | men | women |
| Doubles | men | women |
- Kremlin Cup

Mary Pierce defeated Monica Seles in the final, 7–6^{(7–2)}, 6–3 to win the women's singles tennis title at the 1998 Kremlin Cup.

Jana Novotná was the reigning champion, but chose not to compete that year.

== Seeds ==
A champion seed is indicated in bold text while text in italics indicates the round in which that seed was eliminated. The top four seeds received a bye to the second round.

1. (United States) Venus Williams (semifinals)
2. (United States) Monica Seles (final)
3. (Spain) Conchita Martínez (quarterfinals)
4. (Switzerland) Patty Schnyder (second round)
5. (France) **Mary Pierce (champion)**
6. (Russia) Anna Kournikova (first round)
7. (France) Sandrine Testud (semifinals)
8. (Romania) Irina Spîrlea (first round)

== Draw ==
Key

- Q = Qualifier
- WC = Wild card
- LL = Lucky loser
- Alt = Alternate
- ITF = ITF entry
- PR = Protected ranking
- SR = Special ranking
- SE = Special exempt
- JE = Junior exempt
- JR = Junior Accelerator Programme entrant
- CO = College Accelerator Programme entrant
- NG = Next Gen Accelerator Program entrant
- w/o = Walkover
- r = Retired
- d = Defaulted

=== Final ===
Semifinals
1 | (United States) Venus Williams | **6** | 2 | 0
5 | (France) **Mary Pierce** | 2 | **6** | **6**
7 | (France) Sandrine Testud | 3 | 6^{7}
2 | (United States) **Monica Seles** | **6** | **7^{9}**

Final
5 | (France) **Mary Pierce** | **7^{7}** | **6**
2 | (United States) Monica Seles | 6^{2} | 3

=== Top half ===
First round
(Russia) **E Likhovtseva** | 3 | **6** | **6**
(Romania) R Dragomir | **6** | 3 | 3
(South Africa) J Kruger | 4 | **6** | 4
Q | (Slovakia) **K Studeníková** | **6** | 3 | **6**
(United States) **C Rubin** | **6** | **6**
8 | (Romania) I Spîrlea | 2 | 3
(Spain) **M Serna** | 5 | **6** | **6**
(United States) L Raymond | **7** | 3 | 4
Q | (Russia) E Dementieva | 4 | 4
WC | (Belgium) **S Appelmans** | **6** | **6**
(Japan) A Sugiyama | **7** | 2 | 4
5 | (France) **M Pierce** | 5 | **6** | **6**

Second round
1 | (United States) **V Williams** | **6** | **6**
(Russia) E Likhovtseva | 3 | 1
Q | (Slovakia) **K Studeníková** | **6** | **7**
(United States) C Rubin | 3 | 5
4 | (Switzerland) P Schnyder | 6^{3} | 4
(Spain) **M Serna** | **7^{7}** | **6**
WC | (Belgium) S Appelmans | 2 | 2
5 | (France) **M Pierce** | **6** | **6**

Quarterfinals
1 | (United States) **V Williams** | **6** | **6**
Q | (Slovakia) K Studeníková | 1 | 0
(Spain) M Serna | 5 | 3
5 | (France) **M Pierce** | **7** | **6**

Semifinals
1 | (United States) V Williams | **6** | 2 | 0
5 | (France) **M Pierce** | 2 | **6** | **6**

=== Bottom half ===
First round
7 | (France) **S Testud** | **6** | **6**
Q | (France) N Dechy | 2 | 2
WC | (Russia) T Panova | 3 | 2
(Belarus) **N Zvereva** | **6** | **6**
WC | (Russia) **N Petrova** | 6^{5} | **7^{7}** | **6**
(Croatia) I Majoli | **7^{7}** | 6^{5} | 0
6 | (Russia) A Kournikova | 6^{5} | **6** | 1
(Italy) **S Farina** | **7^{7}** | 4 | **6**
Q | (Slovakia) K Habšudová | 2 | 3
(Slovakia) **H Nagyová** | **6** | **6**
(Austria) **B Schett** | **6** | **6**
(Germany) A Huber | 2 | 3

Second round
7 | (France) **S Testud** | **6** | **6**
(Belarus) N Zvereva | 4 | 3
WC | (Russia) N Petrova | 0 | 0
3 | (Spain) **C Martínez** | **6** | **6**
(Italy) **S Farina** | **6** | **6**
(Slovakia) H Nagyová | 3 | 1
(Austria) B Schett | 3 | 4
2 | (United States) **M Seles** | **6** | **6**

Quarterfinals
7 | (France) **S Testud** | **7^{7}** | **7**
3 | (Spain) C Martínez | 6^{4} | 5
(Italy) S Farina | 0 | 1
2 | (United States) **M Seles** | **6** | **6**

Semifinals
7 | (France) S Testud | 3 | 6^{7}
2 | (United States) **M Seles** | **6** | **7^{9}**
