= 1998 Kremlin Cup – Women's doubles =

Women's doubles
- 1998 Kremlin Cup

Final
- Champions: (France) Mary Pierce (Belarus) Natasha Zvereva
- Runners-up: (United States) Lisa Raymond (Australia) Rennae Stubbs
- Score: 6–3, 6–4

Details
- Seeds: 4

Events
| Singles | men | women |
| Doubles | men | women |
- Kremlin Cup

Arantxa Sánchez Vicario and Natasha Zvereva were the defending champions but only Zvereva competed that year with Mary Pierce.

Pierce and Zvereva won in the final 6–3, 6–4 against Lisa Raymond and Rennae Stubbs.

== Seeds ==
Champion seeds are indicated in bold text while text in italics indicates the round in which those seeds were eliminated.

1. (United States) Lisa Raymond / (Australia) Rennae Stubbs (final)
2. (Spain) Conchita Martínez / (Argentina) Patricia Tarabini (quarterfinals)
3. (United States) Katrina Adams / (Latvia) Larisa Neiland (first round)
4. (Russia) Elena Likhovtseva / (Japan) Ai Sugiyama (first round)

== Draw ==
Key

- Q = Qualifier
- WC = Wild card
- LL = Lucky loser
- Alt = Alternate
- ITF = ITF entry
- PR = Protected ranking
- SR = Special ranking
- SE = Special exempt
- JE = Junior exempt
- JR = Junior Accelerator Programme entrant
- CO = College Accelerator Programme entrant
- NG = Next Gen Accelerator Program entrant
- w/o = Walkover
- r = Retired
- d = Defaulted

First round
1 | (United States) **L Raymond** (Australia) **R Stubbs** | **6** | **6**
(Romania) I Spîrlea (Netherlands) C Vis | 0 | 3
(Netherlands) **M Bollegraf** (Ukraine) **E Tatarkova** | **6** | **6**
(Belgium) S Appelmans (Germany) A Huber | 3 | 0
3 | (United States) K Adams (Latvia) L Neiland | 3 | 3
Q | (Zimbabwe) **C Black** (Kazakhstan) **I Selyutina** | **6** | **6**
(France) J Halard-Decugis (United States) C Rubin | 4 | 0 | r
(Romania) **C Cristea** (United States) **C Morariu** | **6** | **1**
(Russia) **A Kournikova** (United States) **M Seles** | **6** | 3 | **6**
(Austria) B Schett (Switzerland) P Schnyder | 4 | **6** | 3
(United States) **S Williams** (United States) **V Williams** | 3 | **7** | **7**
4 | (Russia) E Likhovtseva (Japan) A Sugiyama | **6** | 5 | 6
WC | (Russia) E Makarova (Russia) N Petrova | 0 | 6
(France) **M Pierce** (Belarus) **N Zvereva** | **6** | **7**
(Italy) S Farina (Slovakia) K Habšudová | 4 | 4
2 | (Spain) **C Martínez** (Argentina) **P Tarabini** | **6** | **6**

Quarterfinals
1 | (United States) **L Raymond** (Australia) **R Stubbs** | **6** | **6**
(Netherlands) M Bollegraf (Ukraine) E Tatarkova | 3 | 2
Q | (Zimbabwe) **C Black** (Kazakhstan) **I Selyutina** | **6** | **6**
(Romania) C Cristea (United States) C Morariu | 4 | 0
(Russia) **A Kournikova** (United States) **M Seles** | **w/o**
(United States) S Williams (United States) V Williams
(France) **M Pierce** (Belarus) **N Zvereva** | **6** | **6**
2 | (Spain) C Martínez (Argentina) P Tarabini | 2 | 2

Semifinals
1 | (United States) **L Raymond** (Australia) **R Stubbs** | **6** | **7**
Q | (Zimbabwe) C Black (Kazakhstan) I Selyutina | 3 | 5
(Russia) A Kournikova (United States) M Seles | 4 | 1
(France) **M Pierce** (Belarus) **N Zvereva** | **6** | **6**

Final
1 | (United States) Lisa Raymond (Australia) Rennae Stubbs | 3 | 4
(France) **Mary Pierce** (Belarus) **Natasha Zvereva** | **6** | **6**
