= 1997 ATP Tour =

Men's tennis circuit

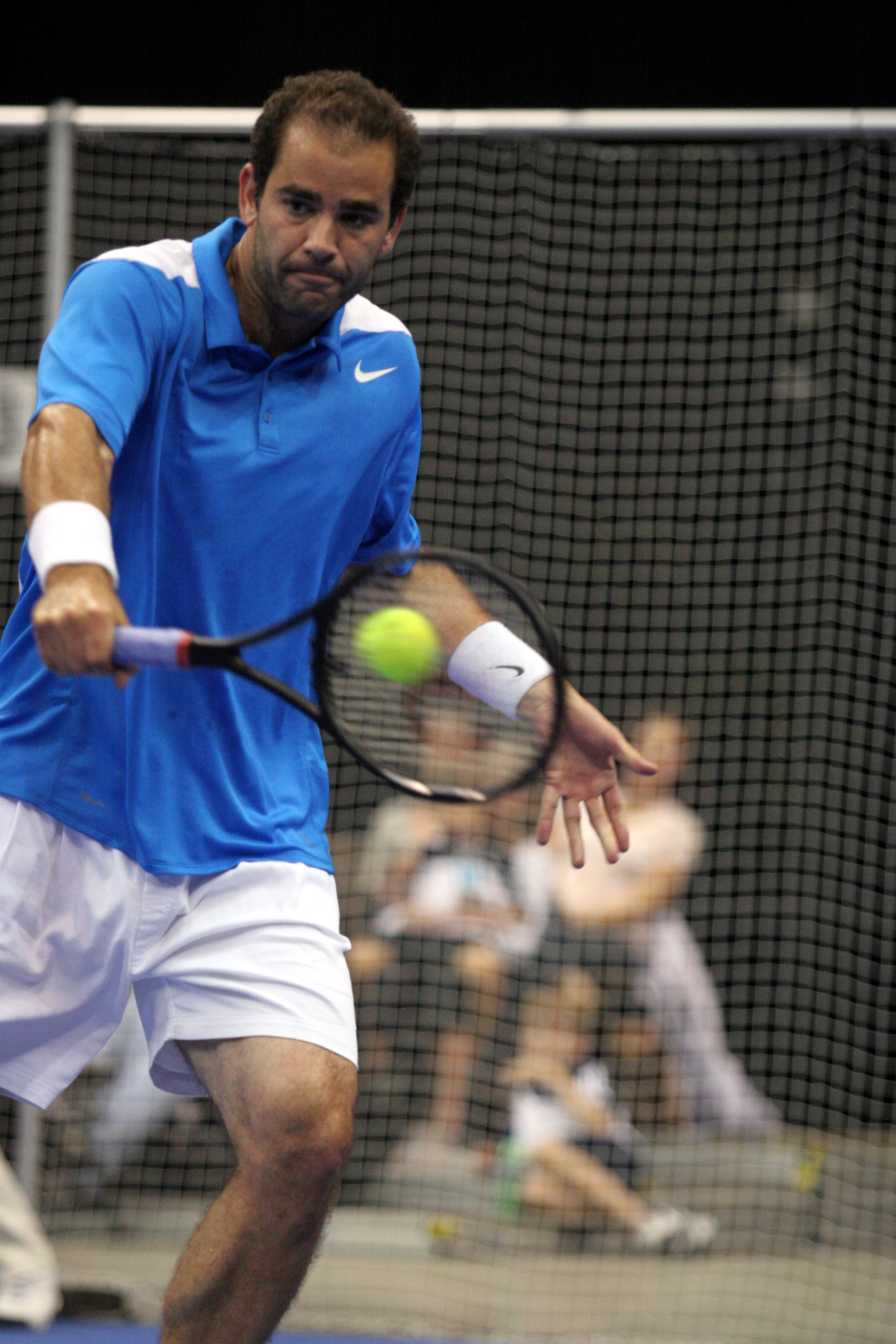
- Pete Sampras finished the year ranked world No. 1 for the fifth time in his career. He won eight titles during the season, including two majors at the Australian Open and the Wimbledon Championships, as well as the Grand Slam Cup and the ATP Tour World Championships. He also won two ATP Super 9 events.

Details
- Duration: 30 December 1996 – 10 November 1997
- Categories: Grand Slam (4); ATP Super 9 (9); ATP Championship Series (12); ATP World Series

Achievements (singles)
- Most titles: (United States) Pete Sampras (8)
- Most finals: (United States) Pete Sampras (8)
- Prize money leader: (United States) Pete Sampras ($6,494,461)
- Points leader: (United States) Pete Sampras (4547)

Awards
- Player of the year: (United States) Pete Sampras
- Doubles team of the year: (Australia) Todd Woodbridge (Australia) Mark Woodforde
- Most improved player of the year: (Australia) Patrick Rafter
- Newcomer of the year: (Spain) Julian Alonso
- Comeback player of the year: (Spain) Sergi Bruguera

The 1997 ATP Tour was the elite tour for professional tennis organised by the ATP that year. The ATP Tour included the four Grand Slam tournaments, the ATP Tour World Championships, the ATP Super 9, the Championship Series and the World Series tournaments.

== Schedule ==
The tables below summarises the results for the 1997 ATP Tour.

Key

Grand Slam tournaments
ATP Tour World Championships
ATP Super 9
ATP Championship Series
ATP World Series
Team events

=== January ===
Week	Tournament	Champions	Runners-up	Semifinalists	Quarterfinalists
30 Dec	Hopman Cup; Perth, Australia; Hopman Cup; Hard (i) – 8 teams (RR)	United States; 2–1	South Africa	Round robin (Group A) Croatia; France; Australia	Round robin (Group B) Switzerland; Romania; Germany
30 Dec	Australian Men's Hardcourt Championships; Adelaide, Australia; World Series; Hard – $303,000 – 32S/16D; Singles – Doubles	(Australia) Todd Woodbridge; 6–2, 6–1	(Australia) Scott Draper	(Sweden) Mikael Tillström (United States) Jeff Tarango	(Russia) Andrei Cherkasov (United States) Alex O'Brien (Sweden) Jonas Björkman (Slovakia) Karol Kučera
30 Dec	Australian Men's Hardcourt Championships; Adelaide, Australia; World Series; Hard – $303,000 – 32S/16D; Singles – Doubles	(Australia) Patrick Rafter (United States) Bryan Shelton; 6–4, 1–6, 6–3	(Australia) Todd Woodbridge (Australia) Mark Woodforde	(Sweden) Mikael Tillström (United States) Jeff Tarango	(Russia) Andrei Cherkasov (United States) Alex O'Brien (Sweden) Jonas Björkman (Slovakia) Karol Kučera
30 Dec	Qatar Mobil Open; Doha, Qatar; World Series; Hard – $600,000 – 32S/16D; Singles – Doubles	(United States) Jim Courier; 7–5, 6–7^{(5–7)}, 6–2	(United Kingdom) Tim Henman	(Spain) Sergi Bruguera (Morocco) Hicham Arazi	(Austria) Thomas Muster (Czech Republic) Petr Korda (Sweden) Magnus Gustafsson (Sweden) Magnus Larsson
30 Dec	Qatar Mobil Open; Doha, Qatar; World Series; Hard – $600,000 – 32S/16D; Singles – Doubles	(Netherlands) Jacco Eltingh (Netherlands) Paul Haarhuis; 6–3, 6–2	(Sweden) Patrik Fredriksson (Sweden) Magnus Norman	(Spain) Sergi Bruguera (Morocco) Hicham Arazi	(Austria) Thomas Muster (Czech Republic) Petr Korda (Sweden) Magnus Gustafsson (Sweden) Magnus Larsson
6 Jan	Sydney International; Sydney, Australia; World Series; Hard – $303,000 – 32S/16D; Singles – Doubles	(United Kingdom) Tim Henman; 6–3, 6–1	(Spain) Carlos Moyá	(Croatia) Goran Ivanišević (Spain) Albert Costa	(Australia) Sandon Stolle (United States) Alex O'Brien (Zimbabwe) Byron Black (Australia) Patrick Rafter
6 Jan	Sydney International; Sydney, Australia; World Series; Hard – $303,000 – 32S/16D; Singles – Doubles	(Argentina) Luis Lobo (Spain) Javier Sánchez; 6–4, 6–7, 6–3	(Netherlands) Paul Haarhuis (Netherlands) Jan Siemerink	(Croatia) Goran Ivanišević (Spain) Albert Costa	(Australia) Sandon Stolle (United States) Alex O'Brien (Zimbabwe) Byron Black (Australia) Patrick Rafter
6 Jan	BellSouth Open; Auckland, New Zealand; World Series; Hard – $303,000 – 32S/16D; Singles – Doubles	(Sweden) Jonas Björkman; 7–6^{(7–0)}, 6–0	(Denmark) Kenneth Carlsen	(South Africa) Marcos Ondruska (Czech Republic) Jiří Novák	(Chile) Marcelo Ríos (United States) Jan-Michael Gambill (Argentina) Hernán Gumy (Germany) Alex Rădulescu
6 Jan	BellSouth Open; Auckland, New Zealand; World Series; Hard – $303,000 – 32S/16D; Singles – Doubles	(South Africa) Ellis Ferreira (United States) Patrick Galbraith; 6–4, 4–6, 7–6	(United States) Rick Leach (United States) Jonathan Stark	(South Africa) Marcos Ondruska (Czech Republic) Jiří Novák	(Chile) Marcelo Ríos (United States) Jan-Michael Gambill (Argentina) Hernán Gumy (Germany) Alex Rădulescu
13 Jan; 20 Jan	Australian Open; Melbourne, Australia; Grand Slam; Hard – $3,538,866 – 128S/64D/32XD; Singles – Doubles; Mixed doubles	(United States) Pete Sampras; 6–2, 6–3, 6–3	(Spain) Carlos Moyá	(Austria) Thomas Muster (United States) Michael Chang	(Spain) Albert Costa (Croatia) Goran Ivanišević (Spain) Félix Mantilla (Chile) Marcelo Ríos
13 Jan; 20 Jan	Australian Open; Melbourne, Australia; Grand Slam; Hard – $3,538,866 – 128S/64D/32XD; Singles – Doubles; Mixed doubles	(Australia) Todd Woodbridge (Australia) Mark Woodforde; 4–6, 7–5, 7–5, 6–3	(Canada) Sébastien Lareau (United States) Alex O'Brien	(Austria) Thomas Muster (United States) Michael Chang	(Spain) Albert Costa (Croatia) Goran Ivanišević (Spain) Félix Mantilla (Chile) Marcelo Ríos
13 Jan; 20 Jan	Australian Open; Melbourne, Australia; Grand Slam; Hard – $3,538,866 – 128S/64D/32XD; Singles – Doubles; Mixed doubles	(United States) Rick Leach (Netherlands) Manon Bollegraf; 6–3, 6–7^{(5–7)}, 7–5	(South Africa) John-Laffnie de Jager (Latvia) Larisa Neiland	(Austria) Thomas Muster (United States) Michael Chang	(Spain) Albert Costa (Croatia) Goran Ivanišević (Spain) Félix Mantilla (Chile) Marcelo Ríos
27 Jan	Croatian Indoors; Zagreb, Croatia; World Series; Carpet (i) – $375,000 – 32S/16D; Singles – Doubles	(Croatia) Goran Ivanišević; 7–6^{(7–4)}, 4–6, 7–6^{(8–6)}	(United Kingdom) Greg Rusedski	(Spain) Javier Sánchez (Sweden) Thomas Enqvist	(Germany) Alex Rădulescu (Argentina) Gastón Etlis (Czech Republic) Martin Damm (Morocco) Hicham Arazi
27 Jan	Croatian Indoors; Zagreb, Croatia; World Series; Carpet (i) – $375,000 – 32S/16D; Singles – Doubles	(Croatia) Saša Hiršzon (Croatia) Goran Ivanišević; 6–4, 6–3	(South Africa) Brent Haygarth (United States) Mark Keil	(Spain) Javier Sánchez (Sweden) Thomas Enqvist	(Germany) Alex Rădulescu (Argentina) Gastón Etlis (Czech Republic) Martin Damm (Morocco) Hicham Arazi
27 Jan	Shanghai Open; Shanghai, China; World Series; Carpet (i) – $305,000 – 32S/16D; Singles – Doubles	(Slovakia) Ján Krošlák; 6–2, 7–6^{(7–2)}	(Russia) Alexander Volkov	(New Zealand) Brett Steven (India) Leander Paes	(United States) Doug Flach (France) Gérard Solvès (United States) Jeff Tarango (France) Jérôme Golmard
27 Jan	Shanghai Open; Shanghai, China; World Series; Carpet (i) – $305,000 – 32S/16D; Singles – Doubles	(Belarus) Max Mirnyi (Zimbabwe) Kevin Ullyett; 7–6, 6–7, 7–5	(Sweden) Tomas Nydahl (Italy) Stefano Pescosolido	(New Zealand) Brett Steven (India) Leander Paes	(United States) Doug Flach (France) Gérard Solvès (United States) Jeff Tarango (France) Jérôme Golmard

=== February ===
Week	Tournament	Champions	Runners-up	Semifinalists	Quarterfinalists
3 Feb	Davis Cup first round Ribeirão Preto, Brazil – clay Bucharest, Romania – hard (i); Sydney, Australia – grass Příbram, Czech Republic – clay (i); Rome, Italy – clay Mallorca, Spain – clay Durban, South Africa – hard Luleå, Sweden – hard (i)	First-round winners United States 4–1; Netherlands 3–2; Australia 4–1; Czech Republic 3–2; Italy 4–1; Spain 4–1; South Africa 3–1; Sweden 4–1	First-round losers Brazil; Romania; France; India; Mexico; Germany; Russia; Switzerland		
10 Feb	Dubai Tennis Championships; Dubai, United Arab Emirates; World Series; Hard – $1,014,250 – 32S/16D; Singles – Doubles	(Austria) Thomas Muster; 7–5, 7–6^{(7–3)}	(Croatia) Goran Ivanišević	(Czech Republic) Jiří Novák (United States) Jim Courier	(Germany) Boris Becker (Netherlands) Richard Krajicek (South Africa) Wayne Ferreira (Norway) Christian Ruud
10 Feb	Dubai Tennis Championships; Dubai, United Arab Emirates; World Series; Hard – $1,014,250 – 32S/16D; Singles – Doubles	(Netherlands) Sander Groen (Croatia) Goran Ivanišević; 7–6, 6–3	(Australia) Sandon Stolle (Czech Republic) Cyril Suk	(Czech Republic) Jiří Novák (United States) Jim Courier	(Germany) Boris Becker (Netherlands) Richard Krajicek (South Africa) Wayne Ferreira (Norway) Christian Ruud
10 Feb	Marseille Open; Marseille, France; World Series; Hard (i) – $514,250 – 32S/16D; Singles – Doubles	(Sweden) Thomas Enqvist; 6–4, 1–0 retired	(Chile) Marcelo Ríos	(Spain) Sergi Bruguera (France) Fabrice Santoro	(Sweden) Magnus Larsson (Russia) Andrei Chesnokov (Switzerland) Marc Rosset (Germany) Hendrik Dreekmann
10 Feb	Marseille Open; Marseille, France; World Series; Hard (i) – $514,250 – 32S/16D; Singles – Doubles	(Sweden) Thomas Enqvist (Sweden) Magnus Larsson; 6–3, 6–4	(France) Olivier Delaître (France) Fabrice Santoro	(Spain) Sergi Bruguera (France) Fabrice Santoro	(Sweden) Magnus Larsson (Russia) Andrei Chesnokov (Switzerland) Marc Rosset (Germany) Hendrik Dreekmann
10 Feb	Sybase Open; San Jose, California, US; World Series; Hard (i) – $303,000 – 32S/16D; Singles – Doubles	(United States) Pete Sampras; 3–6, 5–0 retired	(United Kingdom) Greg Rusedski	(United States) Todd Martin (United States) Andre Agassi	(United States) Chris Woodruff (United States) Richey Reneberg (Australia) Grant Doyle (United States) Michael Chang
10 Feb	Sybase Open; San Jose, California, US; World Series; Hard (i) – $303,000 – 32S/16D; Singles – Doubles	(United States) Brian MacPhie (South Africa) Gary Muller; 4–6, 7–6, 7–5	(The Bahamas) Mark Knowles (Canada) Daniel Nestor	(United States) Todd Martin (United States) Andre Agassi	(United States) Chris Woodruff (United States) Richey Reneberg (Australia) Grant Doyle (United States) Michael Chang
17 Feb	European Community Championships; Antwerp, Belgium; Championship Series; Hard (i) – $875,000 – 32S/16D; Singles – Doubles	(Switzerland) Marc Rosset; 6–2, 7–5, 6–4	(United Kingdom) Tim Henman	(Czech Republic) Petr Korda (Germany) Marc-Kevin Goellner	(Belgium) Filip Dewulf (Belgium) Dick Norman (Spain) Francisco Clavet (Czech Republic) Martin Damm
17 Feb	European Community Championships; Antwerp, Belgium; Championship Series; Hard (i) – $875,000 – 32S/16D; Singles – Doubles	(South Africa) David Adams (France) Olivier Delaître; 3–6, 6–2, 6–1	(Australia) Sandon Stolle (Czech Republic) Cyril Suk	(Czech Republic) Petr Korda (Germany) Marc-Kevin Goellner	(Belgium) Filip Dewulf (Belgium) Dick Norman (Spain) Francisco Clavet (Czech Republic) Martin Damm
17 Feb	Kroger St. Jude International; Memphis, Tennessee, US; Championship Series; Hard (i) – $700,000 – 48S/24D; Singles – Doubles	(United States) Michael Chang; 6–3, 6–4	(Australia) Todd Woodbridge	(United States) Todd Martin (Sweden) Jonas Björkman	(United States) Richey Reneberg (New Zealand) Brett Steven (Netherlands) Paul Haarhuis (United States) Jeff Tarango
17 Feb	Kroger St. Jude International; Memphis, Tennessee, US; Championship Series; Hard (i) – $700,000 – 48S/24D; Singles – Doubles	(South Africa) Ellis Ferreira (United States) Patrick Galbraith; 6–2, 6–3	(United States) Rick Leach (United States) Jonathan Stark	(United States) Todd Martin (Sweden) Jonas Björkman	(United States) Richey Reneberg (New Zealand) Brett Steven (Netherlands) Paul Haarhuis (United States) Jeff Tarango
24 Feb	Advanta Championships; Philadelphia, PA, US; Championship Series; Hard (i) – $589,250 – 32S/16D; Singles – Doubles	(United States) Pete Sampras; 5–7, 7–6^{(7–4)}, 6–3	(Australia) Patrick Rafter	(Netherlands) Sjeng Schalken (South Africa) Grant Stafford	(United States) Doug Flach (United States) Jonathan Stark (Zimbabwe) Byron Black (Australia) Sandon Stolle
24 Feb	Advanta Championships; Philadelphia, PA, US; Championship Series; Hard (i) – $589,250 – 32S/16D; Singles – Doubles	(Canada) Sébastien Lareau (United States) Alex O'Brien; 6–3, 6–3	(South Africa) Ellis Ferreira (United States) Patrick Galbraith	(Netherlands) Sjeng Schalken (South Africa) Grant Stafford	(United States) Doug Flach (United States) Jonathan Stark (Zimbabwe) Byron Black (Australia) Sandon Stolle
24 Feb	Italian Indoor; Milan, Italy; Championship Series; Carpet (i) – $689,250 – 32S/16D; Singles – Doubles	(Croatia) Goran Ivanišević; 6–2, 6–2	(Spain) Sergi Bruguera	(Germany) David Prinosil (Germany) Nicolas Kiefer	(Czech Republic) Daniel Vacek (Czech Republic) Petr Korda (Slovakia) Karol Kučera (France) Arnaud Boetsch
24 Feb	Italian Indoor; Milan, Italy; Championship Series; Carpet (i) – $689,250 – 32S/16D; Singles – Doubles	(Argentina) Pablo Albano (Sweden) Peter Nyborg; 6–4, 7–6	(South Africa) David Adams (Russia) Andrei Olhovskiy	(Germany) David Prinosil (Germany) Nicolas Kiefer	(Czech Republic) Daniel Vacek (Czech Republic) Petr Korda (Slovakia) Karol Kučera (France) Arnaud Boetsch

=== March ===
Week	Tournament	Champions	Runners-up	Semifinalists	Quarterfinalists
3 Mar	ABN AMRO World Tennis Tournament; Rotterdam, The Netherlands; World Series; Carpet (i) – $725,000 – 32S/16D; Singles – Doubles	(Netherlands) Richard Krajicek; 7–6^{(7–4)}, 7–6^{(7–5)}	(Czech Republic) Daniel Vacek	(Croatia) Goran Ivanišević (Sweden) Thomas Enqvist	(Czech Republic) Petr Korda (Italy) Renzo Furlan (Germany) Alex Rădulescu (Germany) Michael Stich
3 Mar	ABN AMRO World Tennis Tournament; Rotterdam, The Netherlands; World Series; Carpet (i) – $725,000 – 32S/16D; Singles – Doubles	(Netherlands) Jacco Eltingh (Netherlands) Paul Haarhuis; 7–6, 6–4	(Belgium) Libor Pimek (South Africa) Byron Talbot	(Croatia) Goran Ivanišević (Sweden) Thomas Enqvist	(Czech Republic) Petr Korda (Italy) Renzo Furlan (Germany) Alex Rădulescu (Germany) Michael Stich
3 Mar	Franklin Templeton Classic; Scottsdale, Arizona, US; World Series; Hard – $303,000 – 32S/16D; Singles – Doubles	(Australia) Mark Philippoussis; 6–4, 7–6^{(7–4)}	(United States) Richey Reneberg	(United States) Chris Woodruff (Sweden) Jonas Björkman	(Zimbabwe) Byron Black (Spain) Carlos Moyá (Spain) Albert Costa (France) Jérôme Golmard
3 Mar	Franklin Templeton Classic; Scottsdale, Arizona, US; World Series; Hard – $303,000 – 32S/16D; Singles – Doubles	(Argentina) Luis Lobo (Spain) Javier Sánchez; 6–3, 6–3	(Sweden) Jonas Björkman (United States) Rick Leach	(United States) Chris Woodruff (Sweden) Jonas Björkman	(Zimbabwe) Byron Black (Spain) Carlos Moyá (Spain) Albert Costa (France) Jérôme Golmard
10 Mar	Newsweek Champions Cup; Indian Wells, California, US; Super 9 Hard – $2,050,000 – 56S/28D; Singles – Doubles	(United States) Michael Chang; 4–6, 6–3, 6–4, 6–3	(Czech Republic) Bohdan Ulihrach	(Sweden) Jonas Björkman (Austria) Thomas Muster	(Zimbabwe) Byron Black (Spain) Alberto Berasategui (France) Cédric Pioline (Australia) Mark Philippoussis
10 Mar	Newsweek Champions Cup; Indian Wells, California, US; Super 9 Hard – $2,050,000 – 56S/28D; Singles – Doubles	(The Bahamas) Mark Knowles (Canada) Daniel Nestor; 7–5, 6–4	(Australia) Mark Philippoussis (Australia) Patrick Rafter	(Sweden) Jonas Björkman (Austria) Thomas Muster	(Zimbabwe) Byron Black (Spain) Alberto Berasategui (France) Cédric Pioline (Australia) Mark Philippoussis
10 Mar	Copenhagen Open; Copenhagen, Denmark; World Series; Carpet (i) – $203,000 – 32S/16D; Singles – Doubles	(Sweden) Thomas Johansson; 6–4, 3–6, 6–2	(Czech Republic) Martin Damm	(Germany) Lars Burgsmüller (Slovakia) Karol Kučera	(Spain) Tomás Carbonell (Slovakia) Ján Krošlák (France) Guillaume Raoux (Denmark) Frederik Fetterlein
10 Mar	Copenhagen Open; Copenhagen, Denmark; World Series; Carpet (i) – $203,000 – 32S/16D; Singles – Doubles	(Russia) Andrei Olhovskiy (New Zealand) Brett Steven; 6–4, 6–2	(Denmark) Kenneth Carlsen (Denmark) Frederik Fetterlein	(Germany) Lars Burgsmüller (Slovakia) Karol Kučera	(Spain) Tomás Carbonell (Slovakia) Ján Krošlák (France) Guillaume Raoux (Denmark) Frederik Fetterlein
17 Mar; 24 Mar	Lipton Championships; Key Biscayne, Florida, US; Super 9 Hard – $2,450,000 – 96S/48D; Singles – Doubles	(Austria) Thomas Muster; 7–6^{(8–6)}, 6–3, 6–1	(Spain) Sergi Bruguera	(United States) Pete Sampras (United States) Jim Courier	(Germany) Hendrik Dreekmann (Ukraine) Andrei Medvedev (Croatia) Goran Ivanišević (Sweden) Jonas Björkman
17 Mar; 24 Mar	Lipton Championships; Key Biscayne, Florida, US; Super 9 Hard – $2,450,000 – 96S/48D; Singles – Doubles	(Australia) Todd Woodbridge (Australia) Mark Woodforde; 7–6, 7–6	(The Bahamas) Mark Knowles (Canada) Daniel Nestor	(United States) Pete Sampras (United States) Jim Courier	(Germany) Hendrik Dreekmann (Ukraine) Andrei Medvedev (Croatia) Goran Ivanišević (Sweden) Jonas Björkman
17 Mar	St. Petersburg Open; St. Petersburg, Russia; World Series; Carpet (i) – $300,000 – 32S/16D; Singles – Doubles	(Sweden) Thomas Johansson; 6–3, 6–4	(Italy) Renzo Furlan	(Germany) Michael Stich (Slovakia) Ján Krošlák	(Denmark) Kenneth Carlsen (France) Olivier Delaître (Sweden) Magnus Norman (France) Arnaud Clément
17 Mar	St. Petersburg Open; St. Petersburg, Russia; World Series; Carpet (i) – $300,000 – 32S/16D; Singles – Doubles	(Russia) Andrei Olhovskiy (New Zealand) Brett Steven; 6–4, 6–3	(Germany) David Prinosil (Czech Republic) Daniel Vacek	(Germany) Michael Stich (Slovakia) Ján Krošlák	(Denmark) Kenneth Carlsen (France) Olivier Delaître (Sweden) Magnus Norman (France) Arnaud Clément
24 Mar	Grand Prix Hassan II; Casablanca, Morocco; World Series; Clay – $203,000 – 32S/16D; Singles – Doubles	(Morocco) Hicham Arazi; 3–6, 6–1, 6–2	(Argentina) Franco Squillari	(Morocco) Karim Alami (Austria) Gilbert Schaller	(Spain) Fernando Vicente (Morocco) Younes El Aynaoui (Spain) Tomás Carbonell (Spain) Emilio Benfele Álvarez
24 Mar	Grand Prix Hassan II; Casablanca, Morocco; World Series; Clay – $203,000 – 32S/16D; Singles – Doubles	(Portugal) João Cunha-Silva (Portugal) Nuno Marques; 7–6, 6–2	(Morocco) Karim Alami (Morocco) Hicham Arazi	(Morocco) Karim Alami (Austria) Gilbert Schaller	(Spain) Fernando Vicente (Morocco) Younes El Aynaoui (Spain) Tomás Carbonell (Spain) Emilio Benfele Álvarez
31 Mar	Davis Cup Quarterfinals; Newport Beach, California, USA – hard Adelaide, Australia – grass Pesaro, Italy – carpet (i); Växjö, Sweden – carpet (i)	Quarterfinal winners United States 4–1; Australia 5–0; Italy 4–1; Sweden 3–2	Quarterfinal losers Netherlands; Czech Republic; Spain; South Africa		

=== April ===
Week	Tournament	Champions	Runners-up	Semifinalists	Quarterfinalists
7 Apr	Salem Open; Hong Kong; World Series; Hard – $303,000 – 32S/16D; Singles – Doubles	(United States) Michael Chang; 6–3, 6–3	(Australia) Patrick Rafter	(Sweden) Thomas Johansson (United States) Brian MacPhie	(Germany) David Prinosil (United States) Justin Gimelstob (Australia) Todd Woodbridge (Canada) Sébastien Lareau
7 Apr	Salem Open; Hong Kong; World Series; Hard – $303,000 – 32S/16D; Singles – Doubles	(Czech Republic) Martin Damm (Czech Republic) Daniel Vacek; 6–3, 6–4	(Germany) Karsten Braasch (United States) Jeff Tarango	(Sweden) Thomas Johansson (United States) Brian MacPhie	(Germany) David Prinosil (United States) Justin Gimelstob (Australia) Todd Woodbridge (Canada) Sébastien Lareau
7 Apr	Estoril Open; Oeiras, Portugal; World Series; Clay – $600,000 – 32S/16D; Singles – Doubles	(Spain) Àlex Corretja; 6–3, 7–5	(Spain) Francisco Clavet	(Spain) Javier Sánchez (Spain) Félix Mantilla	(Austria) Gilbert Schaller (France) Fabrice Santoro (Spain) Alberto Berasategui (Spain) Carlos Moyá
7 Apr	Estoril Open; Oeiras, Portugal; World Series; Clay – $600,000 – 32S/16D; Singles – Doubles	(Brazil) Gustavo Kuerten (Brazil) Fernando Meligeni; 6–2, 6–2	(Italy) Andrea Gaudenzi (Italy) Filippo Messori	(Spain) Javier Sánchez (Spain) Félix Mantilla	(Austria) Gilbert Schaller (France) Fabrice Santoro (Spain) Alberto Berasategui (Spain) Carlos Moyá
7 Apr	Gold Flake Open; Chennai, India; World Series; Hard – $405,000 – 32S/16D; Singles – Doubles	(Sweden) Mikael Tillström; 6–4, 4–6, 7–5	(Germany) Alex Rădulescu	(Romania) Andrei Pavel (France) Gérard Solvès	(Sweden) Magnus Norman (United States) Jonathan Stark (United States) MaliVai Washington (Germany) Rainer Schüttler
7 Apr	Gold Flake Open; Chennai, India; World Series; Hard – $405,000 – 32S/16D; Singles – Doubles	(India) Mahesh Bhupathi (India) Leander Paes; 7–6, 7–5	(Uzbekistan) Oleg Ogorodov (Israel) Eyal Ran	(Romania) Andrei Pavel (France) Gérard Solvès	(Sweden) Magnus Norman (United States) Jonathan Stark (United States) MaliVai Washington (Germany) Rainer Schüttler
14 Apr	Open SEAT Godó; Barcelona, Spain; Championship Series; Clay – $825,000 – 56S/28D; Singles – Doubles	(Spain) Albert Costa; 7–5, 6–4, 6–4	(Spain) Albert Portas	(Spain) Carlos Moyá (Spain) Alberto Berasategui	(France) Cédric Pioline (Ukraine) Andrei Medvedev (Morocco) Karim Alami (Brazil) Fernando Meligeni
14 Apr	Open SEAT Godó; Barcelona, Spain; Championship Series; Clay – $825,000 – 56S/28D; Singles – Doubles	(Spain) Alberto Berasategui (Spain) Jordi Burillo; 6–3, 7–5	(Argentina) Pablo Albano (Spain) Àlex Corretja	(Spain) Carlos Moyá (Spain) Alberto Berasategui	(France) Cédric Pioline (Ukraine) Andrei Medvedev (Morocco) Karim Alami (Brazil) Fernando Meligeni
14 Apr	Japan Open; Tokyo, Japan; Championship Series; Hard – $935,000 – 56S/28D; Singles – Doubles	(Netherlands) Richard Krajicek; 6–2, 3–6, 6–1	(France) Lionel Roux	(Australia) Patrick Rafter (Sweden) Thomas Johansson	(Germany) David Prinosil (Australia) Todd Woodbridge (Australia) Mark Woodforde (Czech Republic) Martin Damm
14 Apr	Japan Open; Tokyo, Japan; Championship Series; Hard – $935,000 – 56S/28D; Singles – Doubles	(Czech Republic) Martin Damm (Czech Republic) Daniel Vacek; 2–6, 6–2, 7–6	(United States) Justin Gimelstob (Australia) Patrick Rafter	(Australia) Patrick Rafter (Sweden) Thomas Johansson	(Germany) David Prinosil (Australia) Todd Woodbridge (Australia) Mark Woodforde (Czech Republic) Martin Damm
21 Apr	Monte Carlo Open; Roquebrune-Cap-Martin, France; Super 9 Clay – $2,050,000 – 56S/28D; Singles – Doubles	(Chile) Marcelo Ríos; 6–4, 6–3, 6–3	(Spain) Àlex Corretja	(Spain) Carlos Moyá (France) Fabrice Santoro	(Sweden) Magnus Larsson (Netherlands) Richard Krajicek (Norway) Christian Ruud (Spain) Carlos Costa
21 Apr	Monte Carlo Open; Roquebrune-Cap-Martin, France; Super 9 Clay – $2,050,000 – 56S/28D; Singles – Doubles	(United States) Donald Johnson (United States) Francisco Montana; 7–6, 2–6, 7–6	(Netherlands) Jacco Eltingh (Netherlands) Paul Haarhuis	(Spain) Carlos Moyá (France) Fabrice Santoro	(Sweden) Magnus Larsson (Netherlands) Richard Krajicek (Norway) Christian Ruud (Spain) Carlos Costa
21 Apr	U.S. Men's Clay Court Championships; Orlando, Florida; World Series; Clay – $264,250 – 32S/16D; Singles – Doubles	(United States) Michael Chang; 4–6, 6–2, 6–1	(South Africa) Grant Stafford	(Australia) Jason Stoltenberg (United States) Chris Woodruff	(Zimbabwe) Byron Black (Uruguay) Marcelo Filippini (United States) Alex O'Brien (Brazil) Fernando Meligeni
21 Apr	U.S. Men's Clay Court Championships; Orlando, Florida; World Series; Clay – $264,250 – 32S/16D; Singles – Doubles	(United States) Mark Merklein (United States) Vincent Spadea; 6–4, 4–6, 6–4	(United States) Alex O'Brien (United States) Jeff Salzenstein	(Australia) Jason Stoltenberg (United States) Chris Woodruff	(Zimbabwe) Byron Black (Uruguay) Marcelo Filippini (United States) Alex O'Brien (Brazil) Fernando Meligeni
28 Apr	Paegas Czech Open; Prague, Czech Republic; World Series; Clay – $340,000 – 32S/16D; Singles – Doubles	(France) Cédric Pioline; 6–2, 5–7, 7–6^{(7–4)}	(Czech Republic) Bohdan Ulihrach	(Spain) Emilio Benfele Álvarez (France) Fabrice Santoro	(Germany) Marcello Craca (Australia) Richard Fromberg (Spain) Albert Portas (Chile) Marcelo Ríos
28 Apr	Paegas Czech Open; Prague, Czech Republic; World Series; Clay – $340,000 – 32S/16D; Singles – Doubles	(India) Mahesh Bhupathi (India) Leander Paes; 6–1, 6–1	(Czech Republic) Petr Luxa (Czech Republic) David Škoch	(Spain) Emilio Benfele Álvarez (France) Fabrice Santoro	(Germany) Marcello Craca (Australia) Richard Fromberg (Spain) Albert Portas (Chile) Marcelo Ríos
28 Apr	AT&T Challenge; Atlanta, GA, US; World Series; Clay – $303,000 – 32S/16D; Singles	(Uruguay) Marcelo Filippini; 7–6^{(7–2)}, 6–4	(Australia) Jason Stoltenberg	(Sweden) Magnus Norman (United States) Chris Woodruff	(Brazil) Fernando Meligeni (Czech Republic) Petr Korda (Austria) Gilbert Schaller (Australia) Sandon Stolle
28 Apr	AT&T Challenge; Atlanta, GA, US; World Series; Clay – $303,000 – 32S/16D; Singles	(Sweden) Jonas Björkman (Sweden) Nicklas Kulti; 6–2, 7–6	(United States) Scott Davis (United States) Kelly Jones	(Sweden) Magnus Norman (United States) Chris Woodruff	(Brazil) Fernando Meligeni (Czech Republic) Petr Korda (Austria) Gilbert Schaller (Australia) Sandon Stolle
28 Apr	BMW Open; Munich, Germany; World Series; Clay – $400,000 – 32S/16D; Singles – Doubles	(Australia) Mark Philippoussis; 7–6^{(7–3)}, 1–6, 6–4	(Spain) Àlex Corretja	(Czech Republic) Slava Doseděl (Switzerland) Marc Rosset	(Italy) Andrea Gaudenzi (Denmark) Frederik Fetterlein (Germany) Martin Sinner (Spain) Carlos Moyá
28 Apr	BMW Open; Munich, Germany; World Series; Clay – $400,000 – 32S/16D; Singles – Doubles	(Argentina) Pablo Albano (Spain) Àlex Corretja; 3–6, 7–5, 6–2	(Germany) Karsten Braasch (Germany) Jens Knippschild	(Czech Republic) Slava Doseděl (Switzerland) Marc Rosset	(Italy) Andrea Gaudenzi (Denmark) Frederik Fetterlein (Germany) Martin Sinner (Spain) Carlos Moyá

=== May ===
Week	Tournament	Champions	Runners-up	Semifinalists	Quarterfinalists
5 May	ATP German Open; Hamburg, Germany; Super 9 Clay – $2,050,000 – 56S/28D; Singles – Doubles	(Ukraine) Andrei Medvedev; 6–0, 6–4, 6–2	(Spain) Félix Mantilla	(Germany) Tommy Haas (Russia) Yevgeny Kafelnikov	(Morocco) Hicham Arazi (Spain) Alberto Berasategui (Spain) Sergi Bruguera (Spain) Albert Costa
5 May	ATP German Open; Hamburg, Germany; Super 9 Clay – $2,050,000 – 56S/28D; Singles – Doubles	(Argentina) Luis Lobo (Spain) Javier Sánchez; 6–3, 7–6	(United Kingdom) Neil Broad (South Africa) Piet Norval	(Germany) Tommy Haas (Russia) Yevgeny Kafelnikov	(Morocco) Hicham Arazi (Spain) Alberto Berasategui (Spain) Sergi Bruguera (Spain) Albert Costa
5 May	America's Red Clay Championships; Coral Springs, Florida, US; World Series; Clay – $245,000 – 32S/16D; Singles – Doubles	(Australia) Jason Stoltenberg; 6–0, 2–6, 7–5	(Sweden) Jonas Björkman	(United States) Steve Campbell (Belgium) Johan Van Herck	(Spain) Juan Albert Viloca (Armenia) Sargis Sargsian (United States) David Witt (Australia) Mark Woodforde
5 May	America's Red Clay Championships; Coral Springs, Florida, US; World Series; Clay – $245,000 – 32S/16D; Singles – Doubles	(United States) Dave Randall (United States) Greg Van Emburgh; 6–7, 6–2, 7–6	(United States) Luke Jensen (United States) Murphy Jensen	(United States) Steve Campbell (Belgium) Johan Van Herck	(Spain) Juan Albert Viloca (Armenia) Sargis Sargsian (United States) David Witt (Australia) Mark Woodforde
12 May	Italian Open; Rome, Italy; Super 9 Clay – $2,050,000 – 64S/32D; Singles – Doubles	(Spain) Àlex Corretja; 7–5, 7–5, 6–3	(Chile) Marcelo Ríos	(Spain) Alberto Berasategui (Croatia) Goran Ivanišević	(United States) Jim Courier (Germany) Marc-Kevin Goellner (Australia) Scott Draper (Morocco) Karim Alami
12 May	Italian Open; Rome, Italy; Super 9 Clay – $2,050,000 – 64S/32D; Singles – Doubles	(The Bahamas) Mark Knowles (Canada) Daniel Nestor; 6–3, 4–6, 7–5	(Zimbabwe) Byron Black (United States) Alex O'Brien	(Spain) Alberto Berasategui (Croatia) Goran Ivanišević	(United States) Jim Courier (Germany) Marc-Kevin Goellner (Australia) Scott Draper (Morocco) Karim Alami
19 May	Raifeissen Grand Prix; St. Poelten, Austria; World Series; Clay – $400,000 – 32S/16D	(Uruguay) Marcelo Filippini; 7–6^{(7–2)}, 6–2	(Australia) Patrick Rafter	(Sweden) Magnus Norman (Slovakia) Dominik Hrbatý	(Austria) Thomas Muster (Netherlands) Sjeng Schalken (Sweden) Tomas Nydahl (Morocco) Karim Alami
19 May	Raifeissen Grand Prix; St. Poelten, Austria; World Series; Clay – $400,000 – 32S/16D	(United States) Kyle Jones (United States) Scott Melville; 6–2, 7–6	(United States) Luke Jensen (United States) Murphy Jensen	(Sweden) Magnus Norman (Slovakia) Dominik Hrbatý	(Austria) Thomas Muster (Netherlands) Sjeng Schalken (Sweden) Tomas Nydahl (Morocco) Karim Alami
19 May	World Team Cup; Düsseldorf, Germany – clay	(Spain); 3–0	Australia		
26 May; 2 Jun	French Open; Paris, France; Grand Slam; Clay – $5,544,184 – 128S/64D/48XD; Singles – Doubles; Mixed doubles	(Brazil) Gustavo Kuerten; 6–3, 6–4, 6–2	(Spain) Sergi Bruguera	(Belgium) Filip Dewulf (Australia) Patrick Rafter	(Sweden) Magnus Norman (Russia) Yevgeny Kafelnikov (Spain) Galo Blanco (Morocco) Hicham Arazi
26 May; 2 Jun	French Open; Paris, France; Grand Slam; Clay – $5,544,184 – 128S/64D/48XD; Singles – Doubles; Mixed doubles	(Russia) Yevgeny Kafelnikov (Czech Republic) Daniel Vacek; 7–6, 4–6, 6–3	(Australia) Todd Woodbridge (Australia) Mark Woodforde	(Belgium) Filip Dewulf (Australia) Patrick Rafter	(Sweden) Magnus Norman (Russia) Yevgeny Kafelnikov (Spain) Galo Blanco (Morocco) Hicham Arazi
26 May; 2 Jun	French Open; Paris, France; Grand Slam; Clay – $5,544,184 – 128S/64D/48XD; Singles – Doubles; Mixed doubles	(India) Mahesh Bhupathi (Japan) Rika Hiraki; 6–4, 6–1	(United States) Patrick Galbraith (United States) Lisa Raymond	(Belgium) Filip Dewulf (Australia) Patrick Rafter	(Sweden) Magnus Norman (Russia) Yevgeny Kafelnikov (Spain) Galo Blanco (Morocco) Hicham Arazi

=== June ===
Week	Tournament	Champions	Runners-up	Semifinalists	Quarterfinalists
9 Jun	Gerry Weber Open; Halle, Germany; World Series; Grass – $875,000 – 32S/16D; Singles – Doubles	(Russia) Yevgeny Kafelnikov; 7–6^{(7–2)}, 6–7^{(5–7)}, 7–6^{(9–7)}	(Czech Republic) Petr Korda	(Germany) Boris Becker (Netherlands) Paul Haarhuis	(Germany) Michael Stich (United States) Jeff Tarango (United States) Richey Reneberg (Austria) Thomas Muster
9 Jun	Gerry Weber Open; Halle, Germany; World Series; Grass – $875,000 – 32S/16D; Singles – Doubles	(Germany) Karsten Braasch (Germany) Michael Stich; 7–6, 6–3	(South Africa) David Adams (South Africa) Marius Barnard	(Germany) Boris Becker (Netherlands) Paul Haarhuis	(Germany) Michael Stich (United States) Jeff Tarango (United States) Richey Reneberg (Austria) Thomas Muster
9 Jun	Stella Artois Championships; London, Great Britain; World Series; Hard – $675,000 – 56S/28D; Singles – Doubles	(Australia) Mark Philippoussis; 7–5, 6–3	(Croatia) Goran Ivanišević	(Sweden) Jonas Björkman (United Kingdom) Greg Rusedski	(United States) Pete Sampras (Germany) Jens Knippschild (France) Jérôme Golmard (Australia) Patrick Rafter
9 Jun	Stella Artois Championships; London, Great Britain; World Series; Hard – $675,000 – 56S/28D; Singles – Doubles	(Australia) Mark Philippoussis (Australia) Patrick Rafter; 6–2, 4–6, 7–5	(Australia) Sandon Stolle (Czech Republic) Cyril Suk	(Sweden) Jonas Björkman (United Kingdom) Greg Rusedski	(United States) Pete Sampras (Germany) Jens Knippschild (France) Jérôme Golmard (Australia) Patrick Rafter
9 Jun	Internazionali di Carisbo; Bologna, Italy; World Series; Clay – $303,000 – 32S/16D; Singles – Doubles	(Spain) Félix Mantilla; 4–6, 6–2, 6–1	(Brazil) Gustavo Kuerten	(Italy) Marzio Martelli (Morocco) Karim Alami	(Spain) Alberto Berasategui (Morocco) Hicham Arazi (Italy) Andrea Gaudenzi (Ecuador) Nicolás Lapentti
9 Jun	Internazionali di Carisbo; Bologna, Italy; World Series; Clay – $303,000 – 32S/16D; Singles – Doubles	(Brazil) Gustavo Kuerten (Brazil) Fernando Meligeni; 6–2, 7–5	(United States) Dave Randall (United States) Jack Waite	(Italy) Marzio Martelli (Morocco) Karim Alami	(Spain) Alberto Berasategui (Morocco) Hicham Arazi (Italy) Andrea Gaudenzi (Ecuador) Nicolás Lapentti
16 Jun	Nottingham Open; Nottingham, Great Britain; World Series; Grass – $303,000 – 32S/16D; Singles – Doubles	(United Kingdom) Greg Rusedski; 6–4, 7–5	(Slovakia) Karol Kučera	(United Kingdom) Tim Henman (Australia) Sandon Stolle	(Australia) Scott Draper (South Africa) Grant Stafford (Australia) Jason Stoltenberg (United States) Alex O'Brien
16 Jun	Nottingham Open; Nottingham, Great Britain; World Series; Grass – $303,000 – 32S/16D; Singles – Doubles	(South Africa) Ellis Ferreira (United States) Patrick Galbraith; 4–6, 7–6, 7–6	(United Kingdom) Danny Sapsford (United Kingdom) Chris Wilkinson	(United Kingdom) Tim Henman (Australia) Sandon Stolle	(Australia) Scott Draper (South Africa) Grant Stafford (Australia) Jason Stoltenberg (United States) Alex O'Brien
16 Jun	Heineken Trophy; Rosmalen, The Netherlands; World Series; Grass – $475,000 – 32S/16D; Singles – Doubles	(Netherlands) Richard Krajicek; 6–4, 7–6^{(9–7)}	(France) Guillaume Raoux	(United States) Michael Chang (Sweden) Jonas Björkman	(Spain) Francisco Clavet (Czech Republic) Martin Damm (Netherlands) Fernon Wibier (Netherlands) Sjeng Schalken
16 Jun	Heineken Trophy; Rosmalen, The Netherlands; World Series; Grass – $475,000 – 32S/16D; Singles – Doubles	(Netherlands) Jacco Eltingh (Netherlands) Paul Haarhuis; 6–4, 7–5	(United States) Trevor Kronemann (Australia) David Macpherson	(United States) Michael Chang (Sweden) Jonas Björkman	(Spain) Francisco Clavet (Czech Republic) Martin Damm (Netherlands) Fernon Wibier (Netherlands) Sjeng Schalken
23 Jun; 30 Jun	The Championships, Wimbledon; London, Great Britain; Grand Slam; Grass – $5,445,815 – 128S/64D/64XD; Singles – Doubles; Mixed doubles	(United States) Pete Sampras; 6–4, 6–2, 6–4	(France) Cédric Pioline	(Australia) Todd Woodbridge (Germany) Michael Stich	(Germany) Boris Becker (Germany) Nicolas Kiefer (United Kingdom) Tim Henman (United Kingdom) Greg Rusedski
23 Jun; 30 Jun	The Championships, Wimbledon; London, Great Britain; Grand Slam; Grass – $5,445,815 – 128S/64D/64XD; Singles – Doubles; Mixed doubles	(Australia) Todd Woodbridge (Australia) Mark Woodforde; 7–6^{(7–4)}, 7–6^{(9–7)}, 5–7, 6–3	(Netherlands) Jacco Eltingh (Netherlands) Paul Haarhuis	(Australia) Todd Woodbridge (Germany) Michael Stich	(Germany) Boris Becker (Germany) Nicolas Kiefer (United Kingdom) Tim Henman (United Kingdom) Greg Rusedski
23 Jun; 30 Jun	The Championships, Wimbledon; London, Great Britain; Grand Slam; Grass – $5,445,815 – 128S/64D/64XD; Singles – Doubles; Mixed doubles	(Czech Republic) Cyril Suk (Czech Republic) Helena Suková; 4–6, 6–3, 6–4	(Russia) Andrei Olhovskiy (Latvia) Larisa Neiland	(Australia) Todd Woodbridge (Germany) Michael Stich	(Germany) Boris Becker (Germany) Nicolas Kiefer (United Kingdom) Tim Henman (United Kingdom) Greg Rusedski

=== July ===
Week	Tournament	Champions	Runners-up	Semifinalists	Quarterfinalists
7 Jul	Rado Swiss Open; Gstaad, Switzerland; World Series; Clay – $525,000 – 32S/16D	(Spain) Félix Mantilla; 6–1, 6–4, 6–4	(Spain) Juan Albert Viloca	(South Africa) Wayne Ferreira (Spain) Àlex Corretja	(Switzerland) Marc Rosset (Spain) Javier Sánchez (Germany) Nicolas Kiefer (Spain) Alberto Berasategui
7 Jul	Rado Swiss Open; Gstaad, Switzerland; World Series; Clay – $525,000 – 32S/16D	(Russia) Yevgeny Kafelnikov (Czech Republic) Daniel Vacek; 4–6, 7–6, 6–3	(United States) Trevor Kronemann (Australia) David Macpherson	(South Africa) Wayne Ferreira (Spain) Àlex Corretja	(Switzerland) Marc Rosset (Spain) Javier Sánchez (Germany) Nicolas Kiefer (Spain) Alberto Berasategui
7 Jul	Hall of Fame Tennis Championships; Newport, Rhode Island, US; World Series; Grass – $255,000 – 32S/16D	(Armenia) Sargis Sargsian; 7–6^{(7–0)}, 4–6, 7–5	(New Zealand) Brett Steven	(India) Leander Paes (South Africa) Grant Stafford	(Germany) Alex Rădulescu (Australia) Sandon Stolle (United States) David Wheaton (Australia) Mark Woodforde
7 Jul	Hall of Fame Tennis Championships; Newport, Rhode Island, US; World Series; Grass – $255,000 – 32S/16D	(United States) Justin Gimelstob (New Zealand) Brett Steven; 6–3, 6–4	(United States) Kent Kinnear (North Macedonia) Aleksandar Kitinov	(India) Leander Paes (South Africa) Grant Stafford	(Germany) Alex Rădulescu (Australia) Sandon Stolle (United States) David Wheaton (Australia) Mark Woodforde
7 Jul	Swedish Open; Båstad, Sweden; World Series; Clay – $303,000 – 32S/16D; Singles – Doubles	(Sweden) Magnus Norman; 7–5, 6–2	(Spain) Juan Antonio Marín	(Spain) Carlos Costa (Slovakia) Karol Kučera	(Sweden) Patrik Fredriksson (United States) Jeff Tarango (Sweden) Magnus Larsson (Sweden) Tomas Nydahl
7 Jul	Swedish Open; Båstad, Sweden; World Series; Clay – $303,000 – 32S/16D; Singles – Doubles	(Sweden) Nicklas Kulti (Sweden) Mikael Tillström; 6–0, 6–3	(Sweden) Magnus Gustafsson (Sweden) Magnus Larsson	(Spain) Carlos Costa (Slovakia) Karol Kučera	(Sweden) Patrik Fredriksson (United States) Jeff Tarango (Sweden) Magnus Larsson (Sweden) Tomas Nydahl
14 Jul	Mercedes Cup; Stuttgart, Germany; Championship Series; Clay – $915,000 – 48S/24D; Singles – Doubles	(Spain) Àlex Corretja; 6–2, 7–5	(Slovakia) Karol Kučera	(Spain) Albert Portas (Spain) Albert Costa	(Spain) Félix Mantilla (Spain) Sergi Bruguera (Spain) Alberto Berasategui (Russia) Yevgeny Kafelnikov
14 Jul	Mercedes Cup; Stuttgart, Germany; Championship Series; Clay – $915,000 – 48S/24D; Singles – Doubles	(Brazil) Gustavo Kuerten (Brazil) Fernando Meligeni; 6–4, 6–4	(United States) Donald Johnson (United States) Francisco Montana	(Spain) Albert Portas (Spain) Albert Costa	(Spain) Félix Mantilla (Spain) Sergi Bruguera (Spain) Alberto Berasategui (Russia) Yevgeny Kafelnikov
14 Jul	Legg Mason Tennis Classic; Washington, D.C., US; Championship Series; Hard – $550,000 – 56S/28D; Singles – Doubles	(United States) Michael Chang; 5–7, 6–2, 6–1	(Czech Republic) Petr Korda	(New Zealand) Brett Steven (United States) David Wheaton	(Australia) Scott Draper (Germany) Rainer Schüttler (United States) Vincent Spadea (Germany) Tommy Haas
14 Jul	Legg Mason Tennis Classic; Washington, D.C., US; Championship Series; Hard – $550,000 – 56S/28D; Singles – Doubles	(United States) Luke Jensen (United States) Murphy Jensen; 6–4, 6–4	(South Africa) Neville Godwin (Netherlands) Fernon Wibier	(New Zealand) Brett Steven (United States) David Wheaton	(Australia) Scott Draper (Germany) Rainer Schüttler (United States) Vincent Spadea (Germany) Tommy Haas
21 Jul	Infiniti Open; Los Angeles, CA, US; World Series; Hard – $303,000 – 32S/16D	(United States) Jim Courier; 6–4, 6–4	(Sweden) Thomas Enqvist	(Croatia) Goran Ivanišević (France) Guillaume Raoux	(Zimbabwe) Byron Black (Netherlands) Richard Krajicek (Australia) Mark Philippoussis (Denmark) Kenneth Carlsen
21 Jul	Infiniti Open; Los Angeles, CA, US; World Series; Hard – $303,000 – 32S/16D	(Canada) Sébastien Lareau (United States) Alex O'Brien; 7–6, 6–4	(India) Mahesh Bhupathi (United States) Rick Leach	(Croatia) Goran Ivanišević (France) Guillaume Raoux	(Zimbabwe) Byron Black (Netherlands) Richard Krajicek (Australia) Mark Philippoussis (Denmark) Kenneth Carlsen
21 Jul	Croatia Open Umag; Umag, Croatia; World Series; Clay – $375,000 – 32S/16D	(Spain) Félix Mantilla; 6–3, 7–5	(Spain) Sergi Bruguera	(Spain) Alberto Martín (Spain) Carlos Moyá	(Netherlands) Paul Haarhuis (Spain) Javier Sánchez (Slovakia) Dominik Hrbatý (Spain) Albert Portas
21 Jul	Croatia Open Umag; Umag, Croatia; World Series; Clay – $375,000 – 32S/16D	(Romania) Dinu Pescariu (Italy) Davide Sanguinetti; 7–6, 6–4	(Slovakia) Dominik Hrbatý (Slovakia) Karol Kučera	(Spain) Alberto Martín (Spain) Carlos Moyá	(Netherlands) Paul Haarhuis (Spain) Javier Sánchez (Slovakia) Dominik Hrbatý (Spain) Albert Portas
21 Jul	Generali Open; Kitzbühel, Austria; World Series; Clay – $500,000 – 48S/24D	(Belgium) Filip Dewulf; 7–6^{(7–2)}, 6–4, 6–1	(Spain) Julián Alonso	(Czech Republic) Slava Doseděl (Spain) Galo Blanco	(Uruguay) Marcelo Filippini (Argentina) Hernán Gumy (Austria) Stefan Koubek (Russia) Yevgeny Kafelnikov
21 Jul	Generali Open; Kitzbühel, Austria; World Series; Clay – $500,000 – 48S/24D	(Australia) Wayne Arthurs (Australia) Richard Fromberg; 6–4, 6–3	(Austria) Thomas Buchmayer (Austria) Thomas Strengberger	(Czech Republic) Slava Doseděl (Spain) Galo Blanco	(Uruguay) Marcelo Filippini (Argentina) Hernán Gumy (Austria) Stefan Koubek (Russia) Yevgeny Kafelnikov
28 Jul	du Maurier Open; Montreal, Quebec, Canada; Super 9 Hard – $2,050,000 – 56S/28D; Singles – Doubles	(United States) Chris Woodruff; 7–5, 4–6, 6–3	(Brazil) Gustavo Kuerten	(United States) Michael Chang (Russia) Yevgeny Kafelnikov	(Netherlands) Richard Krajicek (France) Fabrice Santoro (Sweden) Thomas Enqvist (Australia) Mark Philippoussis
28 Jul	du Maurier Open; Montreal, Quebec, Canada; Super 9 Hard – $2,050,000 – 56S/28D; Singles – Doubles	(India) Mahesh Bhupathi (India) Leander Paes; 7–6, 6–3	(Canada) Sébastien Lareau (United States) Alex O'Brien	(United States) Michael Chang (Russia) Yevgeny Kafelnikov	(Netherlands) Richard Krajicek (France) Fabrice Santoro (Sweden) Thomas Enqvist (Australia) Mark Philippoussis
28 Jul	Dutch Open; Amsterdam, The Netherlands; World Series; Clay – $475,000 – 32S/16D; Singles – Doubles	(Czech Republic) Slava Doseděl; 7–6^{(7–4)}, 7–6^{(7–5)}, 6–7^{(4–7)}, 6–2	(Spain) Carlos Moyá	(Sweden) Magnus Norman (Uruguay) Marcelo Filippini	(Spain) Francisco Clavet (Norway) Christian Ruud (Spain) Javier Sánchez (Netherlands) John Van Lottum
28 Jul	Dutch Open; Amsterdam, The Netherlands; World Series; Clay – $475,000 – 32S/16D; Singles – Doubles	(Australia) Paul Kilderry (Ecuador) Nicolás Lapentti; 3–6, 7–5, 7–6	(Australia) Andrew Kratzmann (Belgium) Libor Pimek	(Sweden) Magnus Norman (Uruguay) Marcelo Filippini	(Spain) Francisco Clavet (Norway) Christian Ruud (Spain) Javier Sánchez (Netherlands) John Van Lottum

=== August ===
Week	Tournament	Champions	Runners-up	Semifinalists	Quarterfinalists
4 Aug	Great American Insurance ATP Championships; Mason, Ohio, US; Super 9 Hard – $2,050,000 – 56S/28D; Singles – Doubles	(United States) Pete Sampras; 6–3, 6–4	(Austria) Thomas Muster	(Spain) Albert Costa (United States) Michael Chang	(Russia) Yevgeny Kafelnikov (Spain) Sergi Bruguera (Netherlands) Jan Siemerink (Brazil) Gustavo Kuerten
4 Aug	Great American Insurance ATP Championships; Mason, Ohio, US; Super 9 Hard – $2,050,000 – 56S/28D; Singles – Doubles	(Australia) Todd Woodbridge (Australia) Mark Woodforde; 7–6, 4–6, 6–4	(Australia) Mark Philippoussis (Australia) Patrick Rafter	(Spain) Albert Costa (United States) Michael Chang	(Russia) Yevgeny Kafelnikov (Spain) Sergi Bruguera (Netherlands) Jan Siemerink (Brazil) Gustavo Kuerten
4 Aug	Internazionali di Tennis di San Marino; San Marino, San Marino; World Series; Clay – $275,000 – 32S/16D	(Spain) Félix Mantilla; 6–4, 6–1	(Sweden) Magnus Gustafsson	(Slovakia) Dominik Hrbatý (Spain) Carlos Costa	(Norway) Christian Ruud (Romania) Adrian Voinea (Spain) Javier Sánchez (Romania) Andrei Pavel
4 Aug	Internazionali di Tennis di San Marino; San Marino, San Marino; World Series; Clay – $275,000 – 32S/16D	(Italy) Cristian Brandi (Italy) Filippo Messori; 7–5, 6–4	(United States) Brandon Coupe (Mexico) David Roditi	(Slovakia) Dominik Hrbatý (Spain) Carlos Costa	(Norway) Christian Ruud (Romania) Adrian Voinea (Spain) Javier Sánchez (Romania) Andrei Pavel
11 Aug	RCA Championships; Indianapolis, IN, US; Championship Series; Hard – $915,000 – 56S/28D; Singles – Doubles	(Sweden) Jonas Björkman; 6–3, 7–6^{(7–3)}	(Spain) Carlos Moyá	(South Africa) Wayne Ferreira (Australia) Mark Woodforde	(Sweden) Magnus Larsson (Czech Republic) Jiří Novák (United States) Andre Agassi (United States) Tommy Ho
11 Aug	RCA Championships; Indianapolis, IN, US; Championship Series; Hard – $915,000 – 56S/28D; Singles – Doubles	(Australia) Michael Tebbutt (Sweden) Mikael Tillström; 6–3, 6–2	(Sweden) Jonas Björkman (Sweden) Nicklas Kulti	(South Africa) Wayne Ferreira (Australia) Mark Woodforde	(Sweden) Magnus Larsson (Czech Republic) Jiří Novák (United States) Andre Agassi (United States) Tommy Ho
11 Aug	Pilot Pen International; New Haven, CT, US; Championship Series; Hard – $915,000 – 56S/28D; Singles – Doubles	(Russia) Yevgeny Kafelnikov; 7–6^{(7–4)}, 6–4	(Australia) Patrick Rafter	(Czech Republic) Petr Korda (United Kingdom) Greg Rusedski	(United Kingdom) Tim Henman (United States) David Wheaton (Netherlands) Richard Krajicek (Spain) Sergi Bruguera
11 Aug	Pilot Pen International; New Haven, CT, US; Championship Series; Hard – $915,000 – 56S/28D; Singles – Doubles	(India) Mahesh Bhupathi (India) Leander Paes; 6–4, 6–7, 6–2	(Canada) Sébastien Lareau (United States) Alex O'Brien	(Czech Republic) Petr Korda (United Kingdom) Greg Rusedski	(United Kingdom) Tim Henman (United States) David Wheaton (Netherlands) Richard Krajicek (Spain) Sergi Bruguera
18 Aug	Waldbaum's Hamlet Cup; Long Island, NY, US; World Series; Hard – $303,000 – 32S/16D; Singles – Doubles	(Spain) Carlos Moyá; 6–4, 7–6^{(7–1)}	(Australia) Patrick Rafter	(Sweden) Thomas Enqvist (Spain) Julian Alonso	(United States) Michael Chang (United States) Richey Reneberg (Germany) Marc-Kevin Goellner (Croatia) Goran Ivanišević
18 Aug	Waldbaum's Hamlet Cup; Long Island, NY, US; World Series; Hard – $303,000 – 32S/16D; Singles – Doubles	(South Africa) Marcos Ondruska (Germany) David Prinosil; 6–4, 6–4	(United States) Mark Keil (United States) T. J. Middleton	(Sweden) Thomas Enqvist (Spain) Julian Alonso	(United States) Michael Chang (United States) Richey Reneberg (Germany) Marc-Kevin Goellner (Croatia) Goran Ivanišević
18 Aug	MFS Pro Tennis Championships; Boston, MA, US; World Series; Hard – $303,000 – 32S/16D; Singles – Doubles	(Netherlands) Sjeng Schalken; 7–5, 6–3	(Chile) Marcelo Ríos	(Spain) Albert Costa (United States) Jeff Tarango	(Spain) Àlex Corretja (Belgium) Johan Van Herck (United Kingdom) Greg Rusedski (Argentina) Hernán Gumy
18 Aug	MFS Pro Tennis Championships; Boston, MA, US; World Series; Hard – $303,000 – 32S/16D; Singles – Doubles	(Netherlands) Jacco Eltingh (Netherlands) Paul Haarhuis; 6–4, 6–2	(United States) Dave Randall (United States) Jack Waite	(Spain) Albert Costa (United States) Jeff Tarango	(Spain) Àlex Corretja (Belgium) Johan Van Herck (United Kingdom) Greg Rusedski (Argentina) Hernán Gumy
25 Aug; 1 Sep	US Open; New York City, US; Grand Slam; Hard – $5,152,000 – 128S/64D/32XD; Singles – Doubles – Mixed doubles	(Australia) Patrick Rafter; 6–3, 6–2, 4–6, 7–5	(United Kingdom) Greg Rusedski	(Sweden) Jonas Björkman (United States) Michael Chang	(Czech Republic) Petr Korda (Netherlands) Richard Krajicek (Sweden) Magnus Larsson (Chile) Marcelo Ríos
25 Aug; 1 Sep	US Open; New York City, US; Grand Slam; Hard – $5,152,000 – 128S/64D/32XD; Singles – Doubles – Mixed doubles	(Russia) Yevgeny Kafelnikov (Czech Republic) Daniel Vacek; 7–6, 6–3	(Sweden) Jonas Björkman (Sweden) Nicklas Kulti	(Sweden) Jonas Björkman (United States) Michael Chang	(Czech Republic) Petr Korda (Netherlands) Richard Krajicek (Sweden) Magnus Larsson (Chile) Marcelo Ríos
25 Aug; 1 Sep	US Open; New York City, US; Grand Slam; Hard – $5,152,000 – 128S/64D/32XD; Singles – Doubles – Mixed doubles	(United States) Rick Leach (Netherlands) Manon Bollegraf; 3–6, 7–5, 7–6 (7–3)	(Argentina) Pablo Albano (Argentina) Mercedes Paz	(Sweden) Jonas Björkman (United States) Michael Chang	(Czech Republic) Petr Korda (Netherlands) Richard Krajicek (Sweden) Magnus Larsson (Chile) Marcelo Ríos

=== September ===
Week	Tournament	Champions	Runners-up	Semifinalists	Quarterfinalists
8 Sep	Marbella Open; Marbella, Spain; World Series; Clay – $303,000 – 32S/16D; Singles – Doubles	(Spain) Albert Costa; 6–3, 6–2	(Spain) Alberto Berasategui	(Spain) Galo Blanco (Slovakia) Dominik Hrbatý	(Italy) Andrea Gaudenzi (Spain) Francisco Roig (Morocco) Karim Alami (Spain) Julian Alonso
8 Sep	Marbella Open; Marbella, Spain; World Series; Clay – $303,000 – 32S/16D; Singles – Doubles	(Morocco) Karim Alami (Spain) Julian Alonso; 4–6, 6–3, 6–0	(Spain) Alberto Berasategui (Spain) Jordi Burillo	(Spain) Galo Blanco (Slovakia) Dominik Hrbatý	(Italy) Andrea Gaudenzi (Spain) Francisco Roig (Morocco) Karim Alami (Spain) Julian Alonso
8 Sep	Samsung Open; Bournemouth, Great Britain; World Series; Clay – $375,000 – 32S/16D	(Spain) Félix Mantilla; 6–2, 6–2	(Spain) Carlos Moyá	(United Kingdom) Greg Rusedski (South Africa) Marcos Ondruska	(Italy) Davide Scala (Argentina) Lucas Arnold Ker (Spain) Jacobo Díaz (Belgium) Christophe Van Garsse
8 Sep	Samsung Open; Bournemouth, Great Britain; World Series; Clay – $375,000 – 32S/16D	(United States) Kent Kinnear (North Macedonia) Aleksandar Kitinov; 7–6, 6–2	(Spain) Alberto Martín (United Kingdom) Chris Wilkinson	(United Kingdom) Greg Rusedski (South Africa) Marcos Ondruska	(Italy) Davide Scala (Argentina) Lucas Arnold Ker (Spain) Jacobo Díaz (Belgium) Christophe Van Garsse
8 Sep	President's Cup; Tashkent, Uzbekistan; World Series; Hard – $328,000 – 32S/16D; Singles – Doubles	(United Kingdom) Tim Henman; 7–6^{(7–2)}, 6–4	(Switzerland) Marc Rosset	(Russia) Yevgeny Kafelnikov (Spain) Francisco Clavet	(Russia) Andrei Stoliarov (Morocco) Hicham Arazi (Spain) Javier Sánchez (United States) Vincent Spadea
8 Sep	President's Cup; Tashkent, Uzbekistan; World Series; Hard – $328,000 – 32S/16D; Singles – Doubles	(Italy) Vincenzo Santopadre (United States) Vincent Spadea; 6–4, 6–7, 6–0	(Morocco) Hicham Arazi (Israel) Eyal Ran	(Russia) Yevgeny Kafelnikov (Spain) Francisco Clavet	(Russia) Andrei Stoliarov (Morocco) Hicham Arazi (Spain) Javier Sánchez (United States) Vincent Spadea
15 Sep	Davis Cup Semifinals; Washington, D.C., United States – hard Norrköping, Sweden – carpet (i)	Semifinal winners United States 4–1; Sweden 4–1	Semifinal losers Australia; Italy		
22 Sep	Grand Prix de Toulouse; Toulouse, France; World Series; Hard (i) – $375,000 – 32S/16D; Singles – Doubles	(Germany) Nicolas Kiefer; 7–5, 5–7, 6–4	(Australia) Mark Philippoussis	(United States) Vincent Spadea (Germany) Alex Rădulescu	(United States) Justin Gimelstob (France) Arnaud Clément (Germany) Tommy Haas (France) Guillaume Raoux
22 Sep	Grand Prix de Toulouse; Toulouse, France; World Series; Hard (i) – $375,000 – 32S/16D; Singles – Doubles	(Netherlands) Jacco Eltingh (Netherlands) Paul Haarhuis; 6–3, 7–6	(France) Jean-Philippe Fleurian (Belarus) Max Mirnyi	(United States) Vincent Spadea (Germany) Alex Rădulescu	(United States) Justin Gimelstob (France) Arnaud Clément (Germany) Tommy Haas (France) Guillaume Raoux
22 Sep	Romanian Open; Bucharest, Romania; World Series; Clay – $475,000 – 32S/16D	(Australia) Richard Fromberg; 6–1, 7–6^{(7–2)}	(Italy) Andrea Gaudenzi	(Germany) Marc-Kevin Goellner (Spain) Francisco Clavet	(Spain) Carlos Costa (Ecuador) Nicolás Lapentti (Spain) Albert Portas (Spain) Javier Sánchez
22 Sep	Romanian Open; Bucharest, Romania; World Series; Clay – $475,000 – 32S/16D	(Argentina) Luis Lobo (Spain) Javier Sánchez; 7–5, 7–5	(Netherlands) Hendrik Jan Davids (Argentina) Daniel Orsanic	(Germany) Marc-Kevin Goellner (Spain) Francisco Clavet	(Spain) Carlos Costa (Ecuador) Nicolás Lapentti (Spain) Albert Portas (Spain) Javier Sánchez
22 Sep	Grand Slam Cup; Munich, Germany; Grand Slam Cup; Carpet (i) – $6,000,000 – 16S	(United States) Pete Sampras; 6–2, 6–4, 7–5	(Australia) Patrick Rafter	(United Kingdom) Greg Rusedski (Czech Republic) Petr Korda	(Sweden) Jonas Björkman (Russia) Yevgeny Kafelnikov (France) Cédric Pioline (Chile) Marcelo Ríos
29 Sep	Nokia Open; Beijing, China; World Series; Hard (i) – $303,000 – 32S/16D; Singles – Doubles	(United States) Jim Courier; 7–6^{(12–10)}, 3–6, 6–3	(Sweden) Magnus Gustafsson	(Sweden) Thomas Johansson (Denmark) Kenneth Carlsen	(Slovakia) Ján Krošlák (Italy) Gianluca Pozzi (Zimbabwe) Byron Black (United States) Alex O'Brien
29 Sep	Nokia Open; Beijing, China; World Series; Hard (i) – $303,000 – 32S/16D; Singles – Doubles	(India) Mahesh Bhupathi (India) Leander Paes; 7–5, 7–6	(United States) Jim Courier (United States) Alex O'Brien	(Sweden) Thomas Johansson (Denmark) Kenneth Carlsen	(Slovakia) Ján Krošlák (Italy) Gianluca Pozzi (Zimbabwe) Byron Black (United States) Alex O'Brien
29 Sep	Swiss Indoors; Basel, Switzerland; World Series; Carpet (i) – $975,000 – 32S/16D; Singles – Doubles	(United Kingdom) Greg Rusedski; 6–3, 7–6^{(8–6)}, 7–6^{(7–3)}	(Australia) Mark Philippoussis	(United Kingdom) Tim Henman (Czech Republic) Petr Korda	(Russia) Yevgeny Kafelnikov (Sweden) Magnus Norman (Sweden) Thomas Enqvist (France) Lionel Roux
29 Sep	Swiss Indoors; Basel, Switzerland; World Series; Carpet (i) – $975,000 – 32S/16D; Singles – Doubles	(United Kingdom) Tim Henman (Switzerland) Marc Rosset; 7–6, 6–7, 7–6	(Germany) Karsten Braasch (United States) Jim Grabb	(United Kingdom) Tim Henman (Czech Republic) Petr Korda	(Russia) Yevgeny Kafelnikov (Sweden) Magnus Norman (Sweden) Thomas Enqvist (France) Lionel Roux
29 Sep	Campionati Internazionali di Sicilia; Palermo, Italy; World Series; Clay – $303,000 – 32S/16D; Singles – Doubles	(Spain) Alberto Berasategui; 6–4, 6–2	(Slovakia) Dominik Hrbatý	(Spain) Àlex Corretja (Spain) Javier Sánchez	(Spain) Francisco Clavet (Spain) Albert Portas (Uruguay) Marcelo Filippini (Morocco) Karim Alami
29 Sep	Campionati Internazionali di Sicilia; Palermo, Italy; World Series; Clay – $303,000 – 32S/16D; Singles – Doubles	(Australia) Andrew Kratzmann (Belgium) Libor Pimek; 3–6, 6–3, 7–6	(Netherlands) Hendrik Jan Davids (Argentina) Daniel Orsanic	(Spain) Àlex Corretja (Spain) Javier Sánchez	(Spain) Francisco Clavet (Spain) Albert Portas (Uruguay) Marcelo Filippini (Morocco) Karim Alami

=== October ===
Week	Tournament	Champions	Runners-up	Semifinalists	Quarterfinalists
6 Oct	Heineken Open; Singapore, Singapore; Championship Series; Carpet (i) – $550,000 – 32S/16D	(Sweden) Magnus Gustafsson; 4–6, 6–3, 6–3	(Germany) Nicolas Kiefer	(Sweden) Thomas Johansson (Sweden) Mikael Tillström	(United States) Jonathan Stark (United States) Jim Courier (Czech Republic) Martin Damm (Chile) Marcelo Ríos
6 Oct	Heineken Open; Singapore, Singapore; Championship Series; Carpet (i) – $550,000 – 32S/16D	(India) Mahesh Bhupathi (India) Leander Paes; 6–4, 6–4	(United States) Rick Leach (United States) Jonathan Stark	(Sweden) Thomas Johansson (Sweden) Mikael Tillström	(United States) Jonathan Stark (United States) Jim Courier (Czech Republic) Martin Damm (Chile) Marcelo Ríos
6 Oct	CA-TennisTrophy; Vienna, Austria; Championship Series; Carpet (i) – $675,000 – 32S/16D; Singles – Doubles	(Croatia) Goran Ivanišević; 3–6, 6–7^{(4–7)}, 7–6^{(7–4)}, 6–2, 6–3	(United Kingdom) Greg Rusedski	(United Kingdom) Tim Henman (Netherlands) Richard Krajicek	(Slovakia) Karol Kučera (United States) Todd Martin (Czech Republic) Bohdan Ulihrach (Sweden) Magnus Larsson
6 Oct	CA-TennisTrophy; Vienna, Austria; Championship Series; Carpet (i) – $675,000 – 32S/16D; Singles – Doubles	(South Africa) Ellis Ferreira (United States) Patrick Galbraith; 6–3, 6–4	(Germany) Marc-Kevin Goellner (Germany) David Prinosil	(United Kingdom) Tim Henman (Netherlands) Richard Krajicek	(Slovakia) Karol Kučera (United States) Todd Martin (Czech Republic) Bohdan Ulihrach (Sweden) Magnus Larsson
13 Oct	IPB Czech Indoor; Ostrava, Czech Republic; World Series; Carpet (i) – $975,000 – 32S/16D	(Slovakia) Karol Kučera; 6–2 retired	(Sweden) Magnus Norman	(Croatia) Goran Ivanišević (Austria) Thomas Muster	(Czech Republic) Jiří Novák (Czech Republic) Bohdan Ulihrach (Italy) Diego Nargiso (Spain) Sergi Bruguera
13 Oct	IPB Czech Indoor; Ostrava, Czech Republic; World Series; Carpet (i) – $975,000 – 32S/16D	(Czech Republic) Jiří Novák (Czech Republic) David Rikl; 6–2, 6–4	(United States) Donald Johnson (United States) Francisco Montana	(Croatia) Goran Ivanišević (Austria) Thomas Muster	(Czech Republic) Jiří Novák (Czech Republic) Bohdan Ulihrach (Italy) Diego Nargiso (Spain) Sergi Bruguera
13 Oct	Grand Prix de Lyon; Lyon, France; World Series; Carpet (i) – $725,000 – 32S/16D; Singles – Doubles	(France) Fabrice Santoro; 6–4, 6–4	(Germany) Tommy Haas	(Australia) Mark Philippoussis (Russia) Yevgeny Kafelnikov	(France) Cédric Pioline (Spain) Félix Mantilla (Sweden) Thomas Enqvist (Germany) Marc-Kevin Goellner
13 Oct	Grand Prix de Lyon; Lyon, France; World Series; Carpet (i) – $725,000 – 32S/16D; Singles – Doubles	(South Africa) Ellis Ferreira (United States) Patrick Galbraith; 3–6, 6–2, 6–4	(France) Olivier Delaître (France) Fabrice Santoro	(Australia) Mark Philippoussis (Russia) Yevgeny Kafelnikov	(France) Cédric Pioline (Spain) Félix Mantilla (Sweden) Thomas Enqvist (Germany) Marc-Kevin Goellner
20 Oct	Eurocard Open; Stuttgart, Germany; Super 9 Carpet (i) – $2,050,000 – 48S/24D; Singles – Doubles	(Czech Republic) Petr Korda; 7–6^{(8–6)}, 6–2, 6–4	(Netherlands) Richard Krajicek	(Sweden) Jonas Björkman (Australia) Patrick Rafter	(Sweden) Magnus Larsson (Germany) Nicolas Kiefer (United States) Todd Martin (Chile) Marcelo Ríos
20 Oct	Eurocard Open; Stuttgart, Germany; Super 9 Carpet (i) – $2,050,000 – 48S/24D; Singles – Doubles	(Australia) Todd Woodbridge (Australia) Mark Woodforde; 6–3, 6–3	(United States) Rick Leach (United States) Jonathan Stark	(Sweden) Jonas Björkman (Australia) Patrick Rafter	(Sweden) Magnus Larsson (Germany) Nicolas Kiefer (United States) Todd Martin (Chile) Marcelo Ríos
20 Oct	Abierto Mexicano de Tenis; Mexico City, Mexico; World Series; Clay – $305,000 – 32S/16D; Singles – Doubles	(Spain) Francisco Clavet; 6–4, 7–6^{(9–7)}	(Spain) Juan Albert Viloca	(Ecuador) Nicolás Lapentti (Brazil) Fernando Meligeni	(Brazil) André Sá (Spain) Emilio Benfele Álvarez (Argentina) Lucas Arnold Ker (Spain) Juan Antonio Marín
20 Oct	Abierto Mexicano de Tenis; Mexico City, Mexico; World Series; Clay – $305,000 – 32S/16D; Singles – Doubles	(Ecuador) Nicolás Lapentti (Argentina) Daniel Orsanic; 4–6, 6–3, 7–6	(Mexico) Luis Herrera (Mexico) Mariano Sánchez	(Ecuador) Nicolás Lapentti (Brazil) Fernando Meligeni	(Brazil) André Sá (Spain) Emilio Benfele Álvarez (Argentina) Lucas Arnold Ker (Spain) Juan Antonio Marín
27 Oct	Paris Open; Paris, France; Super 9 Carpet (i) – $2,300,000 – 48S/24D; Singles – Doubles	(United States) Pete Sampras; 6–3, 4–6, 6–3, 6–1	(Sweden) Jonas Björkman	(Russia) Yevgeny Kafelnikov (Sweden) Thomas Enqvist	(Austria) Thomas Muster (United Kingdom) Greg Rusedski (Netherlands) Richard Krajicek (France) Guillaume Raoux
27 Oct	Paris Open; Paris, France; Super 9 Carpet (i) – $2,300,000 – 48S/24D; Singles – Doubles	(Netherlands) Jacco Eltingh (Netherlands) Paul Haarhuis; 6–2, 7–6	(United States) Rick Leach (United States) Jonathan Stark	(Russia) Yevgeny Kafelnikov (Sweden) Thomas Enqvist	(Austria) Thomas Muster (United Kingdom) Greg Rusedski (Netherlands) Richard Krajicek (France) Guillaume Raoux
27 Oct	Cerveza Club Colombia Open; Bogotá, Colombia; World Series; Clay – $303,000 – 32S/16D	(Spain) Francisco Clavet; 6–3, 6–3	(Ecuador) Nicolás Lapentti	(Italy) Davide Sanguinetti (United States) Vincent Spadea	(Spain) Emilio Benfele Álvarez (Spain) Jordi Burillo (Spain) Carlos Costa (Brazil) Fernando Meligeni
27 Oct	Cerveza Club Colombia Open; Bogotá, Colombia; World Series; Clay – $303,000 – 32S/16D	(Argentina) Luis Lobo (Brazil) Fernando Meligeni; 6–1, 6–3	(Morocco) Karim Alami (Venezuela) Maurice Ruah	(Italy) Davide Sanguinetti (United States) Vincent Spadea	(Spain) Emilio Benfele Álvarez (Spain) Jordi Burillo (Spain) Carlos Costa (Brazil) Fernando Meligeni

=== November ===
Week	Tournament	Champions	Runners-up	Semifinalists	Quarterfinalists
3 Nov	Chevrolet Cup; Santiago, Chile; World Series; Clay – $303,000 – 32S/16D; Singles – Doubles	(Spain) Julian Alonso; 6–2, 6–1	(Chile) Marcelo Ríos	(Uruguay) Marcelo Filippini (Spain) Jordi Burillo	(Brazil) Fernando Meligeni (Czech Republic) Radomír Vašek (Argentina) Mariano Puerta (Germany) Oliver Gross
3 Nov	Chevrolet Cup; Santiago, Chile; World Series; Clay – $303,000 – 32S/16D; Singles – Doubles	(Netherlands) Hendrik Jan Davids (Australia) Andrew Kratzmann; 7–6, 5–7, 6–4	(Spain) Julian Alonso (Ecuador) Nicolás Lapentti	(Uruguay) Marcelo Filippini (Spain) Jordi Burillo	(Brazil) Fernando Meligeni (Czech Republic) Radomír Vašek (Argentina) Mariano Puerta (Germany) Oliver Gross
3 Nov	Kremlin Cup; Moscow, Russia; World Series; Carpet (i) – $1,125,000 – 32S/16D; Singles – Doubles	(Russia) Yevgeny Kafelnikov; 7–6^{(7–2)}, 6–4	(Czech Republic) Petr Korda	(Canada) Daniel Nestor (Zimbabwe) Wayne Black	(Armenia) Sargis Sargsian (Czech Republic) Martin Damm (Czech Republic) Daniel Vacek (United States) Alex O'Brien
3 Nov	Kremlin Cup; Moscow, Russia; World Series; Carpet (i) – $1,125,000 – 32S/16D; Singles – Doubles	(Czech Republic) Martin Damm (Czech Republic) Cyril Suk; 6–4, 6–3	(South Africa) David Adams (France) Fabrice Santoro	(Canada) Daniel Nestor (Zimbabwe) Wayne Black	(Armenia) Sargis Sargsian (Czech Republic) Martin Damm (Czech Republic) Daniel Vacek (United States) Alex O'Brien
3 Nov	Stockholm Open; Stockholm, Sweden; World Series; Carpet (i) – $800,000 – 32S/16D; Singles – Doubles	(Sweden) Jonas Björkman; 3–6, 7–6^{(7–2)}, 6–2, 6–4	(Netherlands) Jan Siemerink	(Australia) Patrick Rafter (United Kingdom) Greg Rusedski	(United Kingdom) Tim Henman (Slovakia) Karol Kučera (France) Cédric Pioline (Sweden) Magnus Larsson
3 Nov	Stockholm Open; Stockholm, Sweden; World Series; Carpet (i) – $800,000 – 32S/16D; Singles – Doubles	(Germany) Marc-Kevin Goellner (United States) Richey Reneberg; 6–3, 3–6, 7–6	(South Africa) Ellis Ferreira (United States) Patrick Galbraith	(Australia) Patrick Rafter (United Kingdom) Greg Rusedski	(United Kingdom) Tim Henman (Slovakia) Karol Kučera (France) Cédric Pioline (Sweden) Magnus Larsson
10 Nov	ATP Tour World Championships Singles; Hanover, Germany; ATP Tour World Championships; Hard (i) – $3,300,000 – 8S (RR); Singles	(United States) Pete Sampras; 6–3, 6–2, 6–2	(Russia) Yevgeny Kafelnikov	(Sweden) Jonas Björkman (Spain) Carlos Moyá	Round robin (Australia) Patrick Rafter (United Kingdom) Greg Rusedski (Austria) Thomas Muster (Spain) Sergi Bruguera (United Kingdom) Tim Henman (United States) Michael Chang
17 Nov	ATP Tour World Championships Doubles; Hartford, CT, US; ATP Tour World Championships; Carpet (i) – $500,000 – 8D (RR); Doubles	(United States) Rick Leach (United States) Jonathan Stark; 6–3, 6–4, 7–6^{(7–3)}	(India) Mahesh Bhupathi (India) Leander Paes	(Australia) Todd Woodbridge / (Australia) Mark Woodforde (Netherlands) Jacco Eltingh / (Netherlands) Paul Haarhuis	
24 Nov	Davis Cup by BNP Paribas Final; Gothenburg, Sweden – carpet (i)	Sweden; 5–0	United States		

== ATP rankings ==
As of 30 December 1996
Rk	Name	Nation
1	Pete Sampras	USA
2	Michael Chang	USA
3	Goran Ivanišević	CRO
4	Yevgeny Kafelnikov	RUS
5	Thomas Muster	AUT
6	Boris Becker	GER
7	Richard Krajicek	NED
8	Andre Agassi	USA
9	Thomas Enqvist	SWE
10	Wayne Ferreira	RSA
11	Marcelo Ríos	CHI
12	Todd Martin	USA
13	Albert Costa	ESP
14	Stefan Edberg	SWE
15	Jim Courier	USA
16	Magnus Gustafsson	SWE
17	Jan Siemerink	NED
18	Félix Mantilla	ESP
19	Michael Stich	GER
20	Alberto Berasategui	ESP

Year-end rankings 1997 (29 December 1997)
Rk	Name	Nation	Points	High	Low	Change
1	Pete Sampras	USA	4547	1	1	Steady
2	Patrick Rafter	AUS	3210	2	63	▲61
3	Michael Chang	USA	3189	2	4	▼1
4	Jonas Björkman	SWE	2949	4	65	▲61
5	Yevgeny Kafelnikov	RUS	2690	3	11	▼1
6	Greg Rusedski	GBR	2617	4	56	▲41
7	Carlos Moyá	ESP	2508	5	28	▲21
8	Sergi Bruguera	ESP	2367	6	66	▲58
9	Thomas Muster	AUT	2353	2	12	▼4
10	Marcelo Ríos	CHI	2317	6	13	▲1
11	Richard Krajicek	NED	2299	5	19	▼4
12	Àlex Corretja	ESP	2275	4	26	▲13
13	Petr Korda	CZE	2261	8	34	▲21
14	Gustavo Kuerten	BRA	2215	8	89	▲73
15	Goran Ivanišević	CRO	2176	2	38	▼12
16	Félix Mantilla	ESP	2110	11	19	▲2
17	Tim Henman	GBR	1929	14	24	▲7
18	Mark Philippoussis	AUS	1809	13	42	▲11
19	Albert Costa	ESP	1778	9	23	▼6
20	Cédric Pioline	FRA	1534	20	46	▲2

== Statistical information ==
List of players and singles titles won:

- (Spain) Julian Alonso – Santiago (1)
- (Morocco) Hicham Arazi – Casablanca (1)
- (Spain) Alberto Berasategui – Palermo (1)
- (Sweden) Jonas Björkman – Auckland, Indianapolis, Stockholm (3)
- (United States) Michael Chang – Memphis, Indian Wells Masters, Hong Kong, Orlando, Washington, D.C. (5)
- (Spain) Francisco Clavet – Mexico City, Bogotá (2)
- (Spain) Àlex Corretja – Estoril, Rome Masters, Stuttgart (3)
- (Spain) Albert Costa – Barcelona, Marbella (2)
- (United States) Jim Courier – Doha, Los Angeles, Beijing (3)
- (Belgium) Filip Dewulf – Kitzbühel (1)
- (Czech Republic) Slava Doseděl – Amsterdam (1)
- (Sweden) Thomas Enqvist – Marseille (1)
- (Uruguay) Marcelo Filippini – Atlanta, St. Poelten (2)
- (Australia) Richard Fromberg – Bucharest (1)
- (Sweden) Magnus Gustafsson – Singapore (1)
- (United Kingdom) Tim Henman – Sydney, Tashkent (2)
- (Croatia) Goran Ivanišević – Zagreb, Milan, Vienna (3)
- (Sweden) Thomas Johansson – Copenhagen, St. Petersburg (2)
- (Russia) Yevgeny Kafelnikov – Halle, New Haven, Moscow (3)
- (Germany) Nicolas Kiefer – Toulouse (1)
- (Czech Republic) Petr Korda – Stuttgart Masters (1)
- (Slovakia) Ján Krošlák – Shanghai (1)
- (Slovakia) Karol Kučera – Ostrava (1)
- (Brazil) Gustavo Kuerten – French Open
- (Netherlands) Richard Krajicek – Rotterdam, Tokyo, Rosmalen (3)
- (Spain) Félix Mantilla – Bologna, Gstaad, Umag, San Marino, Bournemouth (5)
- (Ukraine) Andrei Medvedev – Hamburg Masters (1)
- (Spain) Carlos Moyá – Long Island (1)
- (Austria) Thomas Muster – Dubai, Miami Masters (2)
- (Sweden) Magnus Norman – Båstad (1)
- (Australia) Mark Philippoussis – Scottsdale, Munich, London (3)
- (France) Cédric Pioline – Prague (1)
- (Australia) Patrick Rafter – US Open (1)
- (Chile) Marcelo Ríos – Monte Carlo Masters (1)
- (Switzerland) Marc Rosset – Antwerp (1)
- (United Kingdom) Greg Rusedski – Nottingham, Basel (2)
- (United States) Pete Sampras – Australian Open, San Jose, Philadelphia, Wimbledon, Cincinnati Masters, Paris Masters, Season-Ending Championships, Grand Slam Cup (8)
- (France) Fabrice Santoro – Lyon (1)
- (Armenia) Sargis Sargsian – Newport (1)
- (Netherlands) Sjeng Schalken – Boston (1)
- (Australia) Jason Stoltenberg – Coral Springs (1)
- (Sweden) Mikael Tillström – Chennai (1)
- (Australia) Todd Woodbridge – Adelaide (1)
- (United States) Chris Woodruff – Canada Masters (1)

Titles won by nation:

- (United States) 16 (Doha, Australian Open, San Jose, Memphis, Philadelphia, Indian Wells Masters, Hong Kong, Orlando, Wimbledon, Washington, D.C., Los Angeles, Canada Masters, Cincinnati Masters, Beijing, Paris Masters, Season-Ending Championships)
- (Spain) 15 (Estoril, Barcelona, Rome Masters, Bologna, Gstaad, Stuttgart, Umag, San Marino, Long Island, Marbella, Bournemouth, Palermo, Mexico City, Bogotá, Santiago)
- (Sweden) 9 (Auckland, Marseille, Copenhagen, St. Petersburg, Chennai, Båstad, Indianapolis, Singapore, Stockholm)
- (Australia) 7 (Adelaide, Scottsdale, Munich, Coral Springs, London, US Open, Bucharest)
- (United Kingdom) 4 (Sydney, Nottingham, Tashkent, Basel)
- (Netherlands) 4 (Rotterdam, Tokyo, Rosmalen, Boston)
- (Croatia) 3 (Zagreb, Milan, Vienna)
- (Russia) 3 (Halle, New Haven, Moscow)
- (Austria) 2 (Dubai, Miami Masters)
- (Czech Republic) 2 (Amsterdam, Stuttgart Masters)
- (France) 2 (Prague, Lyon)
- (Slovakia) 2 (Shanghai, Ostrava)
- (Uruguay) 2 (Atlanta, St. Poelten)
- (Armenia) 1 (Newport)
- (Belgium) 1 (Kitzbühel)
- (Brazil) 1 (French Open)
- (Chile) 1 (Monte Carlo Masters)
- (Germany) 1 (Toulouse)
- (Morocco) 1 (Casablanca)
- (Switzerland) 1 (Antwerp)
- (Ukraine) 1 (Hamburg Masters)

The following players won their first career title:

- (Spain) Julian Alonso – Santiago
- (Morocco) Hicham Arazi – Casablanca
- (Sweden) Jonas Björkman – Auckland
- (United Kingdom) Tim Henman – Sydney
- (Sweden) Thomas Johansson – Copenhagen
- (Germany) Nicolas Kiefer – Toulouse
- (Brazil) Gustavo Kuerten – French Open
- (Sweden) Magnus Norman – Båstad
- (France) Fabrice Santoro – Lyon
- (Armenia) Sargis Sargsian – Newport
- (Sweden) Mikael Tillström – Chennai
- (United States) Chris Woodruff – Canada Masters

== See also ==
- 1997 WTA Tour
