= 2000 Majorca Open =

- Date: 1 – 8 May
- Edition: 6th
- Category: International Series
- Draw: 32S / 16D
- Prize money: $475,000
- Surface: Clay / outdoor
- Location: Mallorca, Spain

Champions

Singles
- (Russia) Marat Safin

Doubles
- (France) Michaël Llodra / (Italy) Diego Nargiso
- Majorca Open

The 2000 Majorca Open was a men's tennis tournament played on outdoor clay courts. It was the 6th edition of the Open de Tenis Comunidad Valenciana, and was part of the International Series of the 2000 ATP Tour. It took place at the Club de Tenis Valencia in Mallorca from 1 May through 8 May 2000.

The 32-player strong singles field featured ATP No. 3, Australian Open runner-up and London finalist Yevgeny Kafelnikov, 1998 Australian Open winner and former world no. 1 Marcelo Ríos and Casablanca titlist Fernando Vicente. Also competing were Barcelona champion Marat Safin, Estoril winner and two-time Grand Slam finalist Carlos Moyá, Mariano Puerta and Francisco Clavet.

Marat Safin won the singles title.

== Finals ==
=== Singles ===
(Russia) Marat Safin defeated (Sweden) Mikael Tillström 6–4, 6–3

- It was Safin's 2nd title of the year, and his 3rd overall.

=== Doubles ===
(France) Michaël Llodra / (Italy) Diego Nargiso defeated (Spain) Alberto Martín / (Spain) Fernando Vicente 7–6^{(7–2)}, 7–6^{(7–3)}

- It was Llodra's only title of the year and the 1st of his career. It was Nargiso's only title of the year and the 5th of his career.
