= 1997 Chennai Open – Doubles =

Doubles
- 1997 Chennai Open

Final
- Champions: (India) Mahesh Bhupathi (India) Leander Paes
- Runners-up: (Uzbekistan) Oleg Ogorodov (Israel) Eyal Ran
- Score: 7–6, 7–5

Events
Singles	Doubles
← 1996 ·	Chennai Open	· 1998 →

Jonas Björkman and Nicklas Kulti were the defending champions, but did not participate this year.

Mahesh Bhupathi and Leander Paes won in the final 7–6, 7–5, against Oleg Ogorodov and Eyal Ran.

== Seeds ==
1. (United States) Rick Leach / (United States) Jonathan Stark (semifinals)
2. (United States) Kent Kinnear / (Belarus) Max Mirnyi (quarterfinals)
3. (India) Mahesh Bhupathi / (India) Leander Paes (champions)
4. (Australia) Pat Cash / (Netherlands) Sander Groen (quarterfinals)

== Draw ==
=== Key ===
- Q = Qualifier
- WC = Wild card
- LL = Lucky loser
- Alt = Alternate
- SE = Special exempt
- PR = Protected ranking
- ITF = ITF entry
- JE = Junior exempt
- w/o = Walkover
- r = Retired
- d = Defaulted
- SR = Special ranking

=== Draw ===
First round
1	(United States) R Leach (United States) J Stark	7	6
(France) J Golmard (France) L Roux	6	4
WC	(India) N Kirtane (India) S Kirtane	1	2
(Sweden) T Nydahl (Romania) A Pavel	6	6
4	(Australia) P Cash (Netherlands) S Groen	7	6
(France) J-P Fleurian (France) G Solvès	5	2
(Uzbekistan) O Ogorodov (Israel) E Ran	6	6
WC	(India) Susheel Narla (India) G Natekar	1	3
(Argentina) G Etlis (Bulgaria) O Stanoytchev	4	6
WC	(Sweden) T Enqvist (Sweden) M Tillström	6	7
(Netherlands) F Wibier (Netherlands) J Winnink	2	4
3	(India) M Bhupathi (India) L Paes	6	6
(Egypt) T El-Sawy (Hungary) G Köves	6	6
Q	(Sweden) L Jonsson (Sweden) M Norman	2	3
(Japan) G Motomura (The Bahamas) R Smith	3	6	1
2	(United States) K Kinnear (Belarus) M Mirnyi	6	1	6

Quarterfinals
1	(United States) R Leach (United States) J Stark	6	7
(Sweden) T Nydahl (Romania) A Pavel	3	5
4	(Australia) P Cash (Netherlands) S Groen	6	5	3
(Uzbekistan) O Ogorodov (Israel) E Ran	1	7	6
WC	(Sweden) T Enqvist (Sweden) M Tillström
3	(India) M Bhupathi (India) L Paes	w/o
(Egypt) T El-Sawy (Hungary) G Köves	4	7	7
2	(United States) K Kinnear (Belarus) M Mirnyi	6	5	6

Semifinals
1	(United States) R Leach (United States) J Stark	7	4	6
(Uzbekistan) O Ogorodov (Israel) E Ran	6	6	7
3	(India) M Bhupathi (India) L Paes	7	7
(Egypt) T El-Sawy (Hungary) G Köves	6	6

Final
(Uzbekistan) O Ogorodov (Israel) E Ran	6	5
3	(India) M Bhupathi (India) L Paes	7	7
