= 1997 Rado Swiss Open =

1997 Rado Open
- Date: 7–13 July
- Edition: 52nd
- Category: World Series
- Draw: 32S / 16D
- Prize money: $525,000
- Surface: Clay / outdoor
- Location: Gstaad, Switzerland
- Venue: Roy Emerson Arena

Champions

Singles
- (Spain) Félix Mantilla

Doubles
- (Russia) Yevgeny Kafelnikov / (Czech Republic) Daniel Vacek
- Swiss Open

The 1997 Rado Swiss Open, was a men's tennis tournament played on outdoor clay courts at the Roy Emerson Arena in Gstaad, Switzerland and was part of the World Series category of the 1997 ATP Tour. It was the 52nd edition of the tournament and was held from 7 July until 13 July 1997. Sixth-seeded Félix Mantilla won the singles title.

== Finals ==
=== Singles ===
(Spain) Félix Mantilla defeated (Spain) Juan Albert Viloca 6–1, 6–4, 6–4

- It was Mantilla's 2nd singles title of the year and the 3rd of his career.

=== Doubles ===
(Russia) Yevgeny Kafelnikov / (Czech Republic) Daniel Vacek defeated (United States) Trevor Kronemann / (Australia) David Macpherson 4–6, 7–6, 6–3

- It was Kafelnikov's 2nd doubles title of the year and the 15th of his career. It was Vacek's 4th doubles title of the year and the 18th of his career.
