= 2000 Majorca Open – Singles =

Singles
- 2000 Majorca Open

Final
- Champion: (Russia) Marat Safin
- Runner-up: (Sweden) Mikael Tillström
- Score: 6–4, 6–3

Details
- Draw: 32
- Seeds: 8

Events
Singles	Doubles
- Majorca Open

== Seeds ==
A champion seed is indicated in bold text while text in italics indicates the round in which that seed was eliminated.

1. (Russia) Yevgeny Kafelnikov (second round)
2. (Chile) Marcelo Ríos (second round)
3. (Spain) Fernando Vicente (first round)
4. (Russia) **Marat Safin (champion)**
5. (Spain) Carlos Moyà (quarterfinals)
6. (Argentina) Mariano Puerta (semifinals)
7. (Spain) Francisco Clavet (first round)
8. (United States) Jeff Tarango (second round)

== Draw ==
Key

- Q = Qualifier
- WC = Wild card
- LL = Lucky loser
- Alt = Alternate
- ITF = ITF entry
- PR = Protected ranking
- SR = Special ranking
- SE = Special exempt
- JE = Junior exempt
- JR = Junior Accelerator Programme entrant
- CO = College Accelerator Programme entrant
- NG = Next Gen Accelerator Program entrant
- w/o = Walkover
- r = Retired
- d = Defaulted

First round
1	(Russia) **Y Kafelnikov**	**6**	5	**6**
(Italy) D Sanguinetti	4	**7**	1
(Argentina) **J I Chela**	4	**7**	**6**
(Sweden) M Gustafsson	**6**	5	3
(Spain) **G Blanco**	**6**	**6**
(Bulgaria) O Stanoytchev	1	4
Q	(France) N Coutelot	**6**	2	1
8	(United States) **J Tarango**	2	**6**	**6**
4	(Russia) **M Safin**	**6**	**7^{7}**
(Romania) A Voinea	4	6^{4}
(Netherlands) J van Lottum	3	2
(Norway) **C Ruud**	**6**	**6**
(Belgium) C Rochus	3	4
Q	(Argentina) **G Coria**	**6**	**6**
WC	(Germany) M-K Goellner	3	4
5	(Spain) **C Moyà**	**6**	**6**
6	(Argentina) **M Puerta**	**6**	**6**
(Austria) M Hipfl	2	3
(Costa Rica) **J A Marín**	**7^{7}**	**6**
(Spain) J Díaz	6^{2}	3
WC	(Spain) S Bruguera	1	1
(Spain) **A Martín**	**6**	**6**
(Spain) **A Berasategui**	**6**	4	**6**
3	(Spain) F Vicente	4	**6**	3
7	(Spain) F Clavet	4	3
(Sweden) **M Tillström**	**6**	**6**
Q	(Argentina) M García	**6**	2	1
(Switzerland) **G Bastl**	3	**6**	**6**
(Italy) A Gaudenzi	2	2
(Spain) **A Portas**	**6**	**6**
Q	(Spain) J Balcells	6^{3}	6^{3}
2	(Chile) **M Ríos**	**7^{7}**	**7^{7}**

Second round
1	(Russia) Y Kafelnikov	**7**	0	3
(Argentina) **J I Chela**	5	**6**	**6**
(Spain) **G Blanco**	4	**6**	**6**
8	(United States) J Tarango	**6**	4	2
4	(Russia) **M Safin**	3	**7**	**7**
(Norway) C Ruud	**6**	5	5
Q	(Argentina) G Coria	3	3
5	(Spain) **C Moyà**	**6**	**6**
6	(Argentina) **M Puerta**	**6**	**6**
(Costa Rica) J A Marín	1	2
(Spain) **A Martín**	**6**	**7^{7}**
(Spain) A Berasategui	3	6^{2}
(Sweden) **M Tillström**	**6**	**6**
(Switzerland) G Bastl	4	2
(Spain) **A Portas**	2	**7^{7}**	**6**
2	(Chile) M Ríos	**6**	6^{4}	4

Quarterfinals
(Argentina) J I Chela	**7**	3	3
(Spain) **G Blanco**	5	**6**	**6**
4	(Russia) **M Safin**	3	**6**	**7^{7}**
5	(Spain) C Moyà	**6**	4	6^{3}
6	(Argentina) **M Puerta**	**6**	**6**
(Spain) A Martín	4	1
(Sweden) **M Tillström**	**6**	**6**
(Spain) A Portas	3	2

Semifinals
(Spain) G Blanco	2	2
4	(Russia) **M Safin**	**6**	**6**
6	(Argentina) M Puerta	**6**	5	1
(Sweden) **M Tillström**	3	**7**	**6**

Final
4	(Russia) **Marat Safin**	**6**	**6**
(Sweden) Mikael Tillström	4	3
