= 1997 Chennai Open =

- Date: 7–14 April
- Edition: 2nd
- Category: World Series
- Draw: 32S / 16D
- Prize money: $405,000
- Surface: Hard / outdoor
- Location: Chennai, India

Champions

Singles
- (Sweden) Mikael Tillström

Doubles
- (India) Leander Paes / (India) Mahesh Bhupathi
← 1996 ·	Maharashtra Open	· 1998 →

The 1997 Chennai Open, known for sponsorship reasons as the 1997 Gold Flake Open, was an ATP men's tennis tournament held in Chennai, India. It was the second edition of the tournament and was held from 7 April to 14 April 1997. Sixth-seeded Mikael Tillström won the singles title.

== Finals ==
=== Singles ===
(Sweden) Mikael Tillström defeated (Germany) Alex Radulescu 6–4, 4–6, 7–5

- It was Tillström's 1st title of the year and the 2nd of his career.

=== Doubles ===
(India) Leander Paes / (India) Mahesh Bhupathi defeated (Uzbekistan) Oleg Ogorodov / (Israel) Eyal Ran 7–6, 7–5

- It was Paes's 1st title of the year and the 1st of his career. It was Bhupathi's 1st title of the year and the 1st of his career.
