= Alex Rădulescu =

German tennis player (born 1974)

- Country (sports): Germany
- Born: 7 December 1974 (age 51) Bucharest, Romania
- Height: 1.87 m (6 ft 1 1/2 in)
- Turned pro: 1992
- Plays: Right-handed (one-handed backhand)
- Prize money: $698,887

Singles
- Career record: 40–56
- Career titles: 0
- Highest ranking: No. 51 (10 March 1997)

Grand Slam singles results
- Australian Open: 1R (1997, 1998)
- French Open: 1R (1997)
- Wimbledon: QF (1996)
- US Open: 3R (1997)

Doubles
- Career record: 8–15
- Career titles: 0
- Highest ranking: No. 184 (2 February 1998)

Grand Slam doubles results
- Wimbledon: 1R (1993)
- Last updated on: 4 December 2021.

Alex Rădulescu (born 7 December 1974) is a former tennis player from Romania, who competed for Germany.

Rădulescu turned professional in 1995. The righthander reached his highest individual ranking on the ATP Tour on 10 March 1997, when he became World No. 51. At the 1996 Wimbledon tournament Rădulescu had his best finish at a Grand Slam tournament, where he reached the quarterfinals by defeating Arnaud Boetsch, Stefano Pescosolido, David Wheaton and Neville Godwin before losing to MaliVai Washington. He currently coaches at the Tennis-Company in Munich.

== Junior Grand Slam finals ==
=== Doubles: 1 (1 runner-up) ===
Result	Year	Tournament	Surface	Partner	Opponents	Score
Loss	1992	French Open	Clay	(Russia) Yevgeny Kafelnikov	(Mexico) Enrique Abaroa (Australia) Grant Doyle	6–7^{(0–7)}, 3–6

== ATP career finals ==
=== Singles: 1 (1 runner-up) ===
Legend Grand Slam Tournaments (0–0) ATP World Tour Finals (0–0) ATP Masters Series (0–0) ATP Championship Series (0–0) ATP World Series (0–1)	Finals by surface Hard (0–1) Clay (0–0) Grass (0–0) Carpet (0–0)	Finals by setting Outdoors (0–1) Indoors (0–0)

Result	W–L	Date	Tournament	Tier	Surface	Opponent	Score
Loss	0–1	Apr 1997	Madras, India	World Series	Hard	(Sweden) Mikael Tillström	4–6, 6–4, 5–7

== ATP Challenger and ITF Futures finals ==
=== Singles: 6 (4–2) ===
Legend ATP Challenger (3–2) ITF Futures (1–0)	Finals by surface Hard (1–2) Clay (1–0) Grass (1–0) Carpet (1–0)

Result	W–L	Date	Tournament	Tier	Surface	Opponent	Score
Loss	0–1	Oct 1993	Gothenburg, Sweden	Challenger	Hard	(United Kingdom) Jeremy Bates	2–6, 3–6
Win	1–1	Nov 1995	Andorra la Vella, Andorra	Challenger	Hard	(Denmark) Kenneth Carlsen	4–6, 6–3, 7–6
Win	2–1	Dec 1995	Velenje, Slovenia	Challenger	Carpet	(Uzbekistan) Oleg Ogorodov	7–6, 6–7, 6–3
Win	3–1	Jun 1996	Annenheim, Austria	Challenger	Grass	(United States) David Wheaton	6–4, 6–2
Loss	3–2	Aug 1998	Segovia, Spain	Challenger	Hard	(Czech Republic) Radek Štěpánek	5–7, 5–7
Win	4–2	May 2002	Poland F1, Wrocław	Futures	Clay	(Socialist Federal Republic of Yugoslavia) Darko Madjarovski	2–6, 6–1, 6–2

=== Doubles: 2 (2–0) ===
Legend ATP Challenger (2–0) ITF Futures (0–0)	Finals by surface Hard (0–0) Clay (1–0) Grass (1–0) Carpet (0–0)

Result	W–L	Date	Tournament	Tier	Surface	Partner	Opponents	Score
Win	1–0	Jul 1994	Bristol, United Kingdom	Challenger	Grass	(Italy) Pietro Pennisi	(Italy) Massimo Bertolini (Belgium) Dick Norman	6–4, 7–5
Win	2–0	Jul 1994	Prague, Czech Republic	Challenger	Clay	(Romania) Andrei Pavel	(Israel) Eyal Ran (New Zealand) Glenn Wilson	6–4, 6–2

== Performance timeline ==
Key
W	F	SF	QF	#R	RR	Q#	DNQ	A	NH

(W) winner; (F) finalist; (SF) semifinalist; (QF) quarterfinalist; (#R) rounds 4, 3, 2, 1; (RR) round-robin stage; (Q#) qualification round; (DNQ) did not qualify; (A) absent; (NH) not held; (SR) strike rate (events won / competed); (W–L) win–loss record.

=== Singles ===
Tournament	1993	1994	1995	1996	1997	1998	SR	W–L	Win%
Grand Slam tournaments
Australian Open	A	A	A	A	1R	1R	0 / 2	0–2	0%
French Open	Q3	A	Q3	Q1	1R	A	0 / 1	0–1	0%
Wimbledon	Q1	A	A	QF	3R	1R	0 / 3	6–3	67%
US Open	A	A	A	1R	3R	1R	0 / 3	2–3	40%
Win–loss	0–0	0–0	0–0	4–2	4–4	0–3	0 / 9	8–9	47%
ATP Masters Series
Indian Wells	A	A	A	Q1	A	A	0 / 0	0–0	–
Miami	A	Q1	1R	1R	1R	A	0 / 3	0–3	0%
Rome	A	A	Q3	A	1R	A	0 / 1	0–1	0%
Hamburg	Q2	Q2	Q1	Q2	2R	A	0 / 1	1–1	50%
Stuttgart	A	A	A	1R	Q1	Q2	0 / 1	0–1	0%
Win–loss	0–0	0–0	0–1	0–2	1–3	0–0	0 / 6	1–6	14%
