= 1997 Chennai Open – Singles =

1997 tennis tournament

Singles
- 1997 Chennai Open

Final
- Champion: (Sweden) Mikael Tillström
- Runner-up: (Germany) Alex Rădulescu
- Score: 6–4, 4–6, 7–5

Details
- Draw: 32
- Seeds: 8

Events
Singles	Doubles
← 1996 ·	Chennai Open	· 1998 →

Mikael Tillström defeated Alex Rădulescu 6–4, 4–6, 7–5 to win the 1997 Chennai Open singles event. Thomas Enqvist was the defending champion.

== Seeds ==
1. (Netherlands) Richard Krajicek (second round)
2. (Sweden) Thomas Enqvist (first round)
3. (United States) MaliVai Washington (quarterfinals)
4. (United States) Jonathan Stark (quarterfinals)
5. (Germany) Alex Rădulescu (final)
6. (Sweden) Mikael Tillström (champion)
7. (Sweden) Magnus Norman (quarterfinals)
8. (France) Lionel Roux (second round)

== Draw ==
=== Key ===
- Q = Qualifier
- WC = Wild card
- LL = Lucky loser
- Alt = Alternate
- SE = Special exempt
- PR = Protected ranking
- ITF = ITF entry
- JE = Junior exempt
- w/o = Walkover
- r = Retired
- d = Defaulted
- SR = Special ranking

=== Finals ===
Semifinals
(Romania) Andrei Pavel	3	3
6	(Sweden) Mikael Tillström	6	6
5	(Germany) Alex Rădulescu	6	6
(France) Gérard Solvès	2	3

Final
6	(Sweden) Mikael Tillström	6	4	7
5	(Germany) Alex Rădulescu	4	6	5

=== Section 1 ===
First round
1	(Netherlands) R Krajicek	6	6
(Sweden) T Nydahl	4	4
Q	(France) J Golmard	3	6	6^{4}
(Romania) A Pavel	6	3	7^{7}
WC	(India) M Bhupathi	1	3
WC	(Australia) P Cash	6	6
(Israel) E Ran	2	1
7	(Sweden) M Norman	6	6
4	(United States) J Stark	6	6
WC	(India) S Narla	0	3
(Italy) M Meneschincheri	6	4	4
(Sweden) L Jonsson	0	6	1^{r}
Q	(France) O Delaître	0	6	6
Q	(Netherlands) J Winnink	6	2	4
(Egypt) T El Sawy	7	5	4
6	(Sweden) M Tillström	5	7	6

Second round
1	(Netherlands) R Krajicek	5	3
(Romania) A Pavel	7	6
WC	(Australia) P Cash	7^{7}	3	3
7	(Sweden) M Norman	6^{3}	6	6
4	(United States) J Stark	4	7	6
(Italy) M Meneschincheri	6	5	0
Q	(France) O Delaître	1	6	0
6	(Sweden) M Tillström	6	3	6

Quarterfinals
(Romania) A Pavel	6	6
7	(Sweden) M Norman	0	2
4	(United States) J Stark	5	3
6	(Sweden) M Tillström	7	6

Semifinals
(Romania) A Pavel	3	3
6	(Sweden) M Tillström	6	6

=== Section 2 ===
First round
5	(Germany) A Rădulescu	5	6	6
(Japan) G Motomura	7	4	4
(Netherlands) F Wibier	7^{7}	6
(Germany) L Burgsmüller	6^{5}	2
(Uzbekistan) O Ogorodov	6	6
(France) J Fleurian	4	1
(Bulgaria) O Stanoytchev	5	7^{8}	3
3	(United States) M Washington	7	6^{6}	6
8	(France) L Roux	6	6
(Germany) M Sinner	3	4
(Brazil) R Jabali	3	1
(France) G Solvès	6	6
(India) L Paes	1	2
(Argentina) G Etlis	6	6
Q	(Germany) R Schüttler	6
2	(Sweden) T Enqvist	6^{r}

Second round
5	(Germany) A Rădulescu	6	7
(Netherlands) F Wibier	4	5
(Uzbekistan) O Ogorodov	6	6^{3}	1
3	(United States) M Washington	3	7^{7}	6
8	(France) L Roux	6^{4}	2
(France) G Solvès	7^{7}	6
(Argentina) G Etlis	4	5
Q	(Germany) R Schüttler	6	7

Quarterfinals
5	(Germany) A Rădulescu	6	6
3	(United States) M Washington	3	4
(France) G Solvès	6	1	6
Q	(Germany) R Schüttler	4	6	2

Semifinals
5	(Germany) A Rădulescu	6	6
(France) G Solvès	3	2
