= 1997 Wimbledon Championships – Men's singles =

Men's singles
- 1997 Wimbledon Championships

Final
- Champion: (United States) Pete Sampras
- Runner-up: (France) Cédric Pioline
- Score: 6–4, 6–2, 6–4

Details
- Draw: 128 (16 Q / 8 WC )
- Seeds: 16

Events
| Singles | men | women | | boys | girls |
| Doubles | men | women | mixed | boys | girls |
| WC Singles | men | women | quad |
| WC Doubles | men | women | quad |
| Legends | men | women | seniors |
| ← 1996 · | Wimbledon Championships | · 1998 → |

Pete Sampras defeated Cédric Pioline in the final, 6–4, 6–2, 6–4 to win the gentlemen's singles tennis title at the 1997 Wimbledon Championships. It was his fourth Wimbledon title and tenth major title overall.

Richard Krajicek was the defending champion, but lost in the fourth round to Tim Henman.

This tournament marked the final major appearances of 1987 champion Pat Cash and 1991 champion Michael Stich.

This was the second year in Wimbledon history, after 1991, where there was play on the Middle Sunday, due to bad weather in the first week. The standout match on the Middle Sunday was the epic third-round match where home favourite Tim Henman defeated Paul Haarhuis, 6–7^{(7–9)}, 6–3, 6–2, 4–6, 14–12 after saving a match point in the fifth set.

== Seeds ==
1. (United States) Pete Sampras (champion)
2. (Croatia) Goran Ivanišević (second round)
3. (Russia) Yevgeny Kafelnikov (fourth round)
4. (Netherlands) Richard Krajicek (fourth round)
5. (United States) Michael Chang (first round)
6. (Austria) Thomas Muster (withdrew)
7. (Australia) Mark Philippoussis (first round)
8. (Germany) Boris Becker (quarterfinals)
9. (Chile) Marcelo Ríos (fourth round)
10. (Spain) Carlos Moyá (second round)
11. (Brazil) Gustavo Kuerten (first round)
12. (Australia) Patrick Rafter (fourth round)
13. (Ukraine) Andriy Medvedev (third round)
14. (United Kingdom) Tim Henman (quarterfinals)
15. (South Africa) Wayne Ferreira (third round)
16. (Czech Republic) Petr Korda (fourth round)
17. (Sweden) Jonas Björkman (first round)

Click on the seed number of a player to go to their draw section.

Thomas Muster withdrew due to injury. He was replaced in the draw by the highest-ranked non-seeded player Jonas Björkman, who became the #17 seed.

== Draw ==
=== Key ===
- Q = Qualifier
- WC = Wild card
- LL = Lucky loser
- Alt = Alternate
- ITF = ITF entry
- PR = Protected ranking
- SR = Special ranking
- SE = Special exempt
- JE = Junior exempt
- JR = Junior Accelerator Programme entrant
- CO = College Accelerator Programme entrant
- NG = Next Gen Accelerator Program entrant
- w/o = Walkover
- r = Retired
- d = Defaulted

=== Finals ===
Quarterfinals
1 | (United States) Pete Sampras | 6 | 6^{5} | 6 | 6
8 | (Germany) Boris Becker | 1 | 7^{7} | 1 | 4
(Germany) Nicolas Kiefer | 6^{7} | 6 | 0 | 4
(Australia) Todd Woodbridge | 7^{9} | 2 | 6 | 6
(Germany) Michael Stich | 6 | 6 | 6
14 | (United Kingdom) Tim Henman | 3 | 2 | 4
(United Kingdom) Greg Rusedski | 4 | 6 | 4 | 3
(France) Cédric Pioline | 6 | 4 | 6 | 6

Semifinals
1 | (United States) Pete Sampras | 6 | 6 | 7^{7}
(Australia) Todd Woodbridge | 2 | 1 | 6^{3}
(Germany) Michael Stich | 7^{7} | 2 | 1 | 7 | 4
(France) Cédric Pioline | 6^{2} | 6 | 6 | 5 | 6

Final
1 | (United States) Pete Sampras | 6 | 6 | 6
(France) Cédric Pioline | 4 | 2 | 4

=== Top half ===
==== Section 1 ====
First round
1 | (United States) P Sampras | 6 | 6 | 6
(Sweden) M Tillström | 4 | 4 | 2
(Germany) H Dreekmann | 6 | 6 | 6
(Sweden) P Fredriksson | 3 | 4 | 3
WC | (United Kingdom) D Sapsford | 3 | 6 | 7^{7} | 6
LL | (Venezuela) N Pereira | 6 | 2 | 6^{5} | 3
(Zimbabwe) B Black | 3 | 7^{7} | 6 | 6
Q | (Australia) P Cash | 6 | 6^{3} | 4 | 4
(Sweden) H Holm | 6^{5} | 4 | 6^{4}
(United States) A O'Brien | 7^{7} | 6 | 7^{7}
(South Africa) N Godwin | 7 | 7^{7} | 6
Q | (Netherlands) HJ Davids | 5 | 6^{2} | 3
(Switzerland) M Rosset | 7 | 6 | 6
(Slovakia) K Kučera | 5 | 2 | 3
(Uruguay) M Filippini | 6 | 6^{4} | 1 | 4
16 | (Czech Republic) P Korda | 4 | 7^{7} | 6 | 6

Second round
1 | (United States) P Sampras | 7^{7} | 7 | 7
(Germany) H Dreekmann | 6^{2} | 5 | 5
WC | (United Kingdom) D Sapsford | 2 | 5 | 2
(Zimbabwe) B Black | 6 | 7 | 6
(United States) A O'Brien | 6 | 6 | 6^{6} | 7^{7}
(South Africa) N Godwin | 3 | 3 | 7^{8} | 6^{5}
(Switzerland) M Rosset | 3 | 0 | 6^{8}
16 | (Czech Republic) P Korda | 6 | 6 | 7^{10}

Third round
1 | (United States) P Sampras | 6 | 6 | 6
(Zimbabwe) B Black | 1 | 2 | 2
(United States) A O'Brien | 3 | 6 | 3 | 7^{7} | 4
16 | (Czech Republic) P Korda | 6 | 4 | 6 | 6^{1} | 6

Fourth round
1 | (United States) P Sampras | 6 | 6 | 6^{8} | 6^{1} | 6
16 | (Czech Republic) P Korda | 4 | 3 | 7^{10} | 7^{7} | 4

==== Section 2 ====
First round
9 | (Chile) M Ríos | 6 | 6 | 6
Q | (India) M Bhupathi | 4 | 4 | 3
(Netherlands) D van Scheppingen | 5 | 6 | 3 | 6 | 6
(Australia) R Fromberg | 7 | 4 | 6 | 1 | 4
(Bulgaria) O Stanoytchev | 6 | 6 | 3 | 1 | 3
Q | (Netherlands) J van Lottum | 3 | 2 | 6 | 6 | 6
(Netherlands) J Siemerink | 7^{7} | 7^{7} | 4 | 4 | 4
(Italy) R Furlan | 6^{5} | 6^{4} | 6 | 6 | 6
(Norway) C Ruud | 2 | 1 | 2
(Germany) T Haas | 6 | 6 | 6
WC | (United Kingdom) M Petchey | 6 | 6 | 6
(Slovakia) J Krošlák | 1 | 2 | 1
(Slovakia) D Hrbatý | 5 | 3 | 1
(Sweden) T Johansson | 7 | 6 | 6
(Spain) M Górriz | 3 | 2 | 3
8 | (Germany) B Becker | 6 | 6 | 6

Second round
9 | (Chile) M Ríos | 6 | 6 | 6^{1} | 7^{9}
(Netherlands) D van Scheppingen | 2 | 3 | 7^{7} | 6^{7}
Q | (Netherlands) J van Lottum | 6 | 6 | 6
(Italy) R Furlan | 3 | 3 | 3
(Germany) T Haas | 6^{4} | 4 | 2
WC | (United Kingdom) M Petchey | 7^{7} | 6 | 6
(Sweden) T Johansson | 1 | 4 | 4
8 | (Germany) B Becker | 6 | 6 | 6

Third round
9 | (Chile) M Ríos | 7^{7} | 6 | 6^{5} | 6
Q | (Netherlands) J van Lottum | 6^{4} | 3 | 7^{7} | 4
WC | (United Kingdom) M Petchey | 3 | 3 | 2
8 | (Germany) B Becker | 6 | 6 | 6

Fourth round
9 | (Chile) M Ríos | 2 | 2 | 6^{5}
8 | (Germany) B Becker | 6 | 6 | 7^{7}

==== Section 3 ====
First round
3 | (Russia) Y Kafelnikov | 6 | 6 | 6
(Spain) J A Marín | 4 | 2 | 0
Q | (Australia) M Tebbutt | 6 | 6 | 4 | 5 | 12
(Spain) J Sánchez | 3 | 4 | 6 | 7 | 14
(Sweden) N Kulti | 7^{7} | 6 | 6
(Germany) M Sinner | 6^{3} | 2 | 3
Q | (Spain) Ó Burrieza | 3 | 4 | 3
(Australia) J Stoltenberg | 6 | 6 | 6
Q | (United States) J Salzenstein | 6^{5} | 6 | 6 | 4 | 7
Q | (Germany) P Baur | 7^{7} | 3 | 3 | 6 | 9
(Russia) A Volkov | 4 | 4 | 2
(Germany) N Kiefer | 6 | 6 | 6
(Armenia) S Sargsian | 7^{7} | 6 | 6
(Belgium) J Van Herck | 6^{4} | 2 | 4
(France) F Santoro | 2 | 3 | 4
13 | (Ukraine) A Medvedev | 6 | 6 | 6

Second round
3 | (Russia) Y Kafelnikov | 6 | 4 | 6 | 6
(Spain) J Sánchez | 2 | 6 | 3 | 4
(Sweden) N Kulti | 2 | 6 | 2 | 3
(Australia) J Stoltenberg | 6 | 3 | 6 | 6
Q | (Germany) P Baur | 5 | 6^{2} | 1
(Germany) N Kiefer | 7 | 7^{7} | 6
(Armenia) S Sargsian | 1 | 4 | 5
13 | (Ukraine) A Medvedev | 6 | 6 | 7

Third round
3 | (Russia) Y Kafelnikov | 6 | 7^{7} | 4 | 6
(Australia) J Stoltenberg | 3 | 6^{4} | 6 | 3
(Germany) N Kiefer | 6 | 6 | 6^{2} | 6
13 | (Ukraine) A Medvedev | 4 | 2 | 7^{7} | 4

Fourth round
3 | (Russia) Y Kafelnikov | 2 | 5 | 6 | 1
(Germany) N Kiefer | 6 | 7 | 2 | 6

==== Section 4 ====
First round
12 | (Australia) P Rafter | 2 | 4 | 6 | 6 | 6
(South Africa) G Stafford | 6 | 6 | 3 | 2 | 2
Q | (United States) W McGuire | 4 | 4 | 4
(Germany) J Knippschild | 6 | 6 | 6
Q | (Belgium) C Van Garsse | 6 | 7^{7} | 7^{7}
WC | (United Kingdom) N Weal | 1 | 6^{4} | 6^{3}
(Sweden) M Gustafsson | 6 | 6 | 6
(United States) V Spadea | 2 | 1 | 3
(Romania) A Voinea | 6^{5} | 6 | 1 | 6 | 4
(Germany) A Rădulescu | 7^{7} | 3 | 6 | 3 | 6
(Italy) M Martelli | 6 | 6 | 6
(Germany) B Karbacher | 4 | 3 | 1
(Netherlands) S Schalken | 6 | 5 | 0 | 1^{r}
(South Africa) M Ondruska | 3 | 7 | 6 | 0
(Australia) T Woodbridge | 7^{7} | 3 | 6 | 3 | 8
5 | (United States) M Chang | 6^{5} | 6 | 2 | 6 | 6

Second round
12 | (Australia) P Rafter | 6 | 4 | 6 | 6
(Germany) J Knippschild | 3 | 6 | 3 | 0
Q | (Belgium) C Van Garsse | 6 | 6 | 6
(Sweden) M Gustafsson | 4 | 4 | 1
(Germany) A Rădulescu | 6 | 7 | 6
(Italy) M Martelli | 3 | 5 | 4
(South Africa) M Ondruska | 5 | 1 | 6^{3}
(Australia) T Woodbridge | 7 | 6 | 7^{7}

Third round
12 | (Australia) P Rafter | 7 | 6 | 4 | 6
Q | (Belgium) C Van Garsse | 5 | 4 | 6 | 3
(Germany) A Rădulescu | 4 | 4 | 4
(Australia) T Woodbridge | 6 | 6 | 6

Fourth round
12 | (Australia) P Rafter | 7^{7} | 4 | 6^{6} | 3
(Australia) T Woodbridge | 6^{2} | 6 | 7^{8} | 6

=== Bottom half ===
==== Section 5 ====
First round
17 | (Sweden) J Björkman | 6^{5} | 6 | 7 | 3 | 4
WC | (United Kingdom) C Wilkinson | 7^{7} | 0 | 5 | 6 | 6
(Australia) M Woodforde | 6 | 7 | 6
(India) L Paes | 3 | 5 | 4
Q | (France) A Clément | 2 | 7^{7} | 7 | 6
WC | (United Kingdom) L Milligan | 6 | 6^{1} | 5 | 2
(Portugal) N Marques | 5 | 3 | 3
WC | (United Kingdom) M Lee | 7 | 6 | 6
(Denmark) K Carlsen | 7^{7} | 6 | 4 | 1 | 2
(Spain) E Benfele Álvarez | 6^{4} | 3 | 6 | 6 | 6
(Australia) S Stolle | 6 | 6 | 6
(United States) C Woodruff | 2 | 2 | 4
(Germany) M Stich | 7^{7} | 7 | 7^{7}
(United States) J Courier | 6^{0} | 5 | 6^{2}
(United States) J Gimelstob | 6 | 6 | 4 | 1 | 6
11 | (Brazil) G Kuerten | 3 | 4 | 6 | 6 | 4

Second round
WC | (United Kingdom) C Wilkinson | 7 | 7 | 2 | 4 | 1
(Australia) M Woodforde | 5 | 5 | 6 | 6 | 6
Q | (France) A Clément | 4 | 6 | 6 | 6
WC | (United Kingdom) M Lee | 6 | 2 | 3 | 4
(Spain) E Benfele Álvarez | 4 | 4 | 4
(Australia) S Stolle | 6 | 6 | 6
(Germany) M Stich | 7 | 6 | 6
(United States) J Gimelstob | 5 | 1 | 1

Third round
(Australia) M Woodforde | 6 | 6 | 6
Q | (France) A Clément | 2 | 3 | 3
(Australia) S Stolle | 3 | 7^{7} | 2 | 6^{4}
(Germany) M Stich | 6 | 6^{5} | 6 | 7^{7}

Fourth round
(Australia) M Woodforde | 4 | 7^{7} | 3 | 5
(Germany) M Stich | 6 | 6^{3} | 6 | 7

==== Section 6 ====
First round
14 | (United Kingdom) T Henman | 7^{13} | 6 | 6
(Canada) D Nestor | 6^{11} | 1 | 4
WC | (United Kingdom) J Delgado | 4 | 2 | 7^{7} | 2
(France) J Golmard | 6 | 6 | 6^{4} | 6
(Czech Republic) C Doseděl | 7^{7} | 3 | 4 | 5
Q | (Australia) T Larkham | 6^{3} | 6 | 6 | 7
(Canada) S Lareau | 1 | 2 | 6^{5}
(Netherlands) P Haarhuis | 6 | 6 | 7^{7}
(Ecuador) N Lapentti | 5 | 1 | 3
(Spain) F Clavet | 7 | 6 | 6
Q | (Czech Republic) D Rikl | 6 | 6 | 6
(Czech Republic) D Vacek | 1 | 3 | 3
(Romania) A Pavel | 6 | 4 | 2 | 6 | 6
(Belgium) F Dewulf | 1 | 6 | 6 | 2 | 3
(Germany) M Craca | 6^{5} | 2 | 4
4 | (Netherlands) R Krajicek | 7^{7} | 6 | 6

Second round
14 | (United Kingdom) T Henman | 7^{7} | 6 | 6
(France) J Golmard | 6^{4} | 3 | 3
Q | (Australia) T Larkham | 6 | 3 | 1 | 2
(Netherlands) P Haarhuis | 3 | 6 | 6 | 6
(Spain) F Clavet | 4 | 6^{5} | 4
Q | (Czech Republic) D Rikl | 6 | 7^{7} | 6
(Romania) A Pavel | 6 | 4 | 7^{7} | 3 | 3
4 | (Netherlands) R Krajicek | 3 | 6 | 6^{4} | 6 | 6

Third round
14 | (United Kingdom) T Henman | 6^{7} | 6 | 6 | 4 | 14
(Netherlands) P Haarhuis | 7^{9} | 3 | 2 | 6 | 12
Q | (Czech Republic) D Rikl | 4 | 3 | 5
4 | (Netherlands) R Krajicek | 6 | 6 | 7

Fourth round
14 | (United Kingdom) T Henman | 7^{9} | 6^{7} | 7^{7} | 6
4 | (Netherlands) R Krajicek | 6^{7} | 7^{9} | 6^{5} | 4

==== Section 7 ====
First round
7 | (Australia) M Philippoussis | 6^{6} | 6^{6} | 3
(United Kingdom) G Rusedski | 7^{8} | 7^{8} | 6
LL | (France) S Huet | 6^{5} | 7^{7} | 3 | 6 | 3
(United States) J Stark | 7^{7} | 6^{5} | 6 | 2 | 6
WC | (United Kingdom) A Richardson | 7^{7} | 6 | 6
Q | (Spain) S Durán | 6^{5} | 3 | 3
(Spain) J A Viloca | 7 | 4 | 7^{7} | 7^{7}
(Germany) M-K Goellner | 5 | 6 | 6^{5} | 6^{5}
LL | (Australia) B Ellwood | 1 | 6^{4} | 6 | 4
(United States) D Flach | 6 | 7^{7} | 3 | 6
(France) G Raoux | 6 | 6 | 6
(France) A Boetsch | 3 | 4 | 1
(Morocco) H Arazi | 6^{6} | 4 | 6^{5}
(United States) R Reneberg | 7^{8} | 6 | 7^{7}
LL | (United States) S Bryan | 6^{1} | 3 | 6 | 2
10 | (Spain) C Moyá | 7^{7} | 6 | 4 | 6

Second round
(United Kingdom) G Rusedski | 4 | 6^{9} | 6 | 6 | 11
(United States) J Stark | 6 | 7^{11} | 4 | 3 | 9
WC | (United Kingdom) A Richardson | 6 | 3 | 6 | 2 | 6
(Spain) J A Viloca | 3 | 6 | 4 | 6 | 2
(United States) D Flach | 3 | 7^{7} | 3 | 1
(France) G Raoux | 6 | 6^{5} | 6 | 6
(United States) R Reneberg | 6 | 6 | 6
10 | (Spain) C Moyá | 4 | 3 | 3

Third round
(United Kingdom) G Rusedski | 6 | 6 | 6
WC | (United Kingdom) A Richardson | 3 | 4 | 4
(France) G Raoux | 5 | 7^{7} | 6^{7} | 3
(United States) R Reneberg | 7 | 6^{4} | 7^{9} | 6

Fourth round
(United Kingdom) G Rusedski | 7^{7} | 6 | 7^{7}
(United States) R Reneberg | 6^{2} | 4 | 6^{4}

==== Section 8 ====
First round
15 | (South Africa) W Ferreira | 6^{5} | 3 | 6 | 6 | 7
(Australia) S Draper | 7^{7} | 6 | 4 | 0 | 5
(United States) J Tarango | 6 | 5 | 6^{0} | 4
Q | (France) R Gilbert | 3 | 7 | 7^{7} | 6
(Argentina) J Frana | 6^{5} | 6 | 6 | 6
(Czech Republic) M Damm | 7^{7} | 4 | 3 | 2
(Argentina) M Charpentier | 7 | 3 | 5 | 2
(France) C Pioline | 5 | 6 | 7 | 6
(Denmark) F Fetterlein | 4 | 3 | 6 | 7^{7} | 6
(Czech Republic) J Novák | 6 | 6 | 4 | 6^{3} | 4
(France) L Roux | 2 | 2 | 6^{0}
(New Zealand) B Steven | 6 | 6 | 7^{7}
(Sweden) M Norman | 7^{8} | 6 | 6
Q | (Mexico) L Herrera | 6^{6} | 1 | 4
(Romania) D Pescariu | 1 | 3 | 3
2 | (Croatia) G Ivanišević | 6 | 6 | 6

Second round
15 | (South Africa) W Ferreira | 7^{7} | 4 | 6 | 3 | 9
Q | (France) R Gilbert | 6^{5} | 6 | 3 | 6 | 7
(Argentina) J Frana | w/o
(France) C Pioline
(Denmark) F Fetterlein | 6 | 5 | 3 | 2
(New Zealand) B Steven | 4 | 7 | 6 | 6
(Sweden) M Norman | 6 | 2 | 7^{7} | 4 | 14
2 | (Croatia) G Ivanišević | 3 | 6 | 6^{4} | 6 | 12

Third round
15 | (South Africa) W Ferreira | 4 | 3 | 3
(France) C Pioline | 6 | 6 | 6
(New Zealand) B Steven | 6^{5} | 6 | 6 | 6
(Sweden) M Norman | 7^{7} | 2 | 3 | 1

Fourth round
(France) C Pioline | 3 | 6 | 6 | 7
(New Zealand) B Steven | 6 | 3 | 4 | 5

| Preceded by 1997 French Open – Men's singles | Grand Slam men's singles | Succeeded by 1997 US Open – Men's singles |
