= Gérard Solvès =

French tennis player, coach, and director

- Country (sports): France
- Born: 7 April 1968 (age 56); Lagny-sur-Marne, Paris, France
- Height: 1.85 m (6 ft 1 in)
- Turned pro: 1993
- Plays: Right-handed
- Prize money: $403,190

Singles
- Career record: 21–36
- Career titles: 0
- Highest ranking: No. 105 (25 April 1994)

Grand Slam singles results
- French Open: 2R (1996, 1998)
- Wimbledon: 1R (1994)

Doubles
- Career record: 1–6
- Career titles: 0
- Highest ranking: No. 340 (20 June 1994)

Grand Slam doubles results
- French Open: 1R (1994, 1995)

Gérard Solvès (born 7 April 1968) is a French tennis player, coach and director of the Tennis Club de Paris.

== Career ==
Solvès arrived on the scene in 1993, making the quarterfinals in Munich and Gstaad. He defeated some good players in both tournaments, defeating world number 19 Henrik Holm at Munich and managing a win over Wally Masur in Gstaad. In 1997 he made the quarterfinals of the Shanghai Open and was also a semi-finalist in Chennai that year. Solvès did well at Chennai again in 1998, making it as far as the quarterfinals.

He took part in the singles draw of seven Grand Slams. In both the 1994 and 1995 French Opens, Solvès also played in the men's doubles and mixed doubles. He partnered Fabrice Santoro in the 1994 French Open. His first win was at the French Open in 1996, when he defeated Marcos Ondruska in a 285-minute marathon, which ended at 9–7 in the fifth set. He reached the second round again in the French Open two years later, beating American Richey Reneberg, once more in a five-set match, which saw 14 games played in the final set.
