= Mikael Tillström =

Swedish tennis player

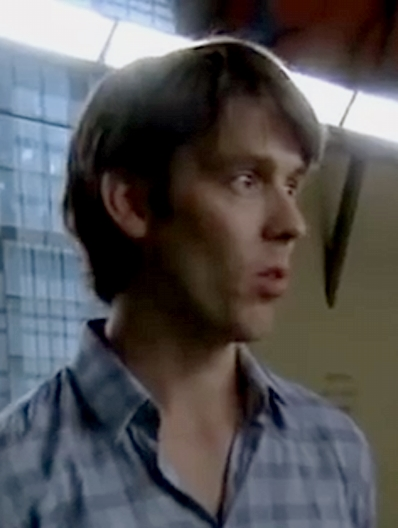
- Country (sports): Sweden
- Residence: Monte Carlo, Monaco
- Born: 5 March 1972 (age 54) Jönköping, Sweden
- Height: 1.85 m (6 ft 1 in)
- Turned pro: 1991
- Retired: 2000
- Plays: Right-handed (two-handed backhand)
- Prize money: $2,030,525

Singles
- Career record: 112–113
- Career titles: 1
- Highest ranking: No. 39 (14 October 1996)

Grand Slam singles results
- Australian Open: QF (1996)
- French Open: 4R (1994)
- Wimbledon: 3R (1996)
- US Open: 3R (1998)

Other tournaments
- Grand Slam Cup: 1R (1996)
- Olympic Games: 3R (2000)

Doubles
- Career record: 111–86
- Career titles: 8
- Highest ranking: No. 15 (17 July 2000)

Grand Slam doubles results
- Australian Open: 3R (1999, 2000)
- French Open: SF (1999)
- Wimbledon: SF (2000)
- US Open: 3R (1998, 2000)
- Last updated on: 10 January 2022.

Mikael Tillström (born 5 March 1972) is a tennis coach and a former professional player from Sweden. He reached his highest ATP singles ranking on 14 October 1996 of world No. 39.

== Professional career ==
Tillström‘s best performance at a Grand Slam came when he got to the quarterfinals of the Australian Open in 1996, defeating Aaron Krickstein, Christian Ruud, Patrick McEnroe and Thomas Muster and then losing to Michael Chang.

Tillstrom won one career title in singles at the Chennai Open, also called then as Gold Flake Open, in 1997, and eight career doubles titles, all but one with fellow Swede Nicklas Kulti.

He also reached the final of 2000 Majorca Open. He represented his native country as at the 2000 Summer Olympics in Sydney, where he was defeated in the third round by Switzerland's Roger Federer.

== Coaching career ==
Mikael Tillström is running the Good to Great Tennis Academy together with Magnus Norman and Nicklas Kulti.

He coached Denis Shapovalov from mid 2025 until February 2026.

He was also the coach of Gaël Monfils (2015–2020, 2023–2026).

He is currently coaching Corentin Moutet.

== Junior Grand Slam finals ==
=== Singles: 1 (1 runner-up) ===
Result	Year	Tournament	Surface	Opponent	Score
Loss	1990	US Open	Hard	(Italy) Andrea Gaudenzi	2–6, 6–4, 6–7

=== Doubles: 1 (1 runner-up) ===
Result	Year	Tournament	Surface	Partner	Opponents	Score
Loss	1990	US Open	Hard	(Sweden) Mårten Renström	(Canada) Sébastien Leblanc (United Kingdom) Greg Rusedski	7–6, 3–6, 4–6

== ATP career finals ==
=== Singles: 5 (1 title, 4 runner-ups) ===
Legend Grand Slam Tournaments (0–0) ATP World Tour Finals (0–0) ATP World Tour Masters Series (0–0) ATP Championship Series (0–1) ATP World Series (1–3)	Finals by surface Hard (1–3) Clay (0–1) Grass (0–0) Carpet (0–0)	Finals by setting Outdoors (1–3) Indoors (0–1)

Result	W–L	Date	Tournament	Tier	Surface	Opponent	Score
Win	1–0	Apr 1997	Chennai, India	World Series	Hard	(Germany) Alex Rădulescu	6–4, 4–6, 7–5
Loss	1–1	Apr 1998	Chennai, India	World Series	Hard	(Australia) Patrick Rafter	3–6, 4–6
Loss	1–2	Oct 1999	Singapore, Singapore	Championship Series	Hard	(Chile) Marcelo Ríos	2–6, 6–7^{(5–7)}
Loss	1–3	Feb 2000	San Jose, United States	World Series	Hard	(Australia) Mark Philippoussis	5–7, 6–4, 3–6
Loss	1–4	May 2000	Majorca, Spain	World Series	Clay	(Russia) Marat Safin	4–6, 3–6

=== Doubles: 12 (8 titles, 4 runner-ups) ===
Legend Grand Slam Tournaments (0–0) ATP World Tour Finals (0–0) ATP World Tour Masters Series (0–0) ATP Championship Series (2–0) ATP World Series (6–4)	Finals by surface Hard (2–0) Clay (4–4) Grass (1–0) Carpet (1–0)	Finals by setting Outdoors (6–4) Indoors (2–0)

Result	W–L	Date	Tournament	Tier	Surface	Partner	Opponents	Score
Loss	0–1	Jul 1992	Hilversum, Netherlands	World Series	Clay	(Sweden) Mårten Renström	(Netherlands) Paul Haarhuis (Netherlands) Mark Koevermans	7–6, 1–6, 4–6
Win	1–1	Aug 1992	San Marino, San Marino	World Series	Clay	(Sweden) Nicklas Kulti	(Italy) Cristian Brandi (Italy) Federico Mordegan	6–2, 6–2
Loss	1–2	Jul 1994	Båstad, Sweden	World Series	Clay	(Sweden) Nicklas Kulti	(Sweden) Jan Apell (Sweden) Jonas Björkman	2–6, 3–6
Win	2–2	Jul 1997	Båstad, Sweden	World Series	Clay	(Sweden) Nicklas Kulti	(Sweden) Magnus Gustafsson (Sweden) Magnus Larsson	6–0, 6–3
Win	3–2	Aug 1997	Indianapolis, United States	Championship Series	Hard	(Australia) Michael Tebbutt	(Sweden) Jonas Björkman (Sweden) Nicklas Kulti	6–3, 6–2
Win	4–2	Feb 1998	St. Petersburg, Russia	World Series	Carpet	(Sweden) Nicklas Kulti	(South Africa) Marius Barnard (South Africa) Brent Haygarth	3–6, 6–3, 7–6
Loss	4–3	Apr 1998	Orlando, United States	World Series	Clay	(Australia) Michael Tebbutt	(South Africa) Grant Stafford (Zimbabwe) Kevin Ullyett	6–4, 4–6, 5–7
Win	5–3	Nov 1998	Stockholm, Sweden	International Series	Hard	(Sweden) Nicklas Kulti	(South Africa) Chris Haggard (Sweden) Peter Nyborg	7–5, 3–6, 7–5
Loss	5–4	Jul 1999	Båstad, Sweden	World Series	Clay	(Sweden) Nicklas Kulti	(South Africa) David Adams (United States) Jeff Tarango	6–7^{(6–8)}, 4–6
Win	6–4	Apr 2000	Barcelona, Spain	Championship Series	Clay	(Sweden) Nicklas Kulti	(Netherlands) Paul Haarhuis (Australia) Sandon Stolle	6–2, 6–7^{(2–7)}, 7–6^{(7–5)}
Win	7–4	Jun 2000	Halle, Germany	International Series	Grass	(Sweden) Nicklas Kulti	(India) Mahesh Bhupathi (Germany) David Prinosil	7–6^{(7–4)}, 7–6^{(7–4)}
Win	8–4	Jul 2000	Båstad, Sweden	International Series	Clay	(Sweden) Nicklas Kulti	(Italy) Andrea Gaudenzi (Italy) Diego Nargiso	4–6, 6–2, 6–3

== ATP Challenger and ITF Futures finals ==
=== Singles: 3 (2–1) ===
Legend ATP Challenger (2–1) ITF Futures (0–0)	Finals by surface Hard (0–0) Clay (2–1) Grass (0–0) Carpet (0–0)

Result	W–L	Date	Tournament	Tier	Surface	Opponent	Score
Loss	0–1	May 1992	Ljubljana, Slovenia	Challenger	Clay	(Sweden) Magnus Larsson	4–6, 4–6
Win	1–1	Jun 1994	Weiden, Germany	Challenger	Clay	(Germany) Jens Knippschild	6–2, 6–4
Win	2–1	Sep 1995	Merano, Italy	Challenger	Clay	(Morocco) Younes El Aynaoui	6–3, 3–6, 6–3

=== Doubles: 13 (11–2) ===
Legend ATP Challenger (11–2) ITF Futures (0–0)	Finals by surface Hard (2–0) Clay (8–2) Grass (0–0) Carpet (1–0)

Result	W–L	Date	Tournament	Tier	Surface	Partner	Opponents	Score
Win	1–0	May 1992	Ljubljana, Slovenia	Challenger	Clay	(Sweden) Magnus Larsson	(Italy) Cristian Brandi (Italy) Federico Mordegan	6–3, 6–2
Win	2–0	Jun 1992	Yvetot, France	Challenger	Clay	(Sweden) Mårten Renström	(Brazil) Jaime Oncins (Czech Republic) Tomas Anzari	7–6, 5–7, 6–2
Win	3–0	Jun 1992	Salzburg, Austria	Challenger	Clay	(Sweden) Jan Apell	(Spain) Jordi Arrese (Sweden) Nils Holm	3–6, 6–2, 6–2
Loss	3–1	Sep 1993	Prague, Czech Republic	Challenger	Clay	(Sweden) Tomas Nydahl	(Czech Republic) David Rikl (Czech Republic) Pavel Vízner	2–6, 6–7
Win	4–1	Oct 1993	Dublin, Ireland	Challenger	Carpet	(Sweden) Mårten Renström	(United States) Todd Nelson (Norway) Bent-Ove Pedersen	6–2, 3–6, 6–3
Loss	4–2	May 1994	Ljubljana, Slovenia	Challenger	Clay	(Denmark) Kenneth Carlsen	(France) Olivier Delaître (France) Jean-Philippe Fleurian	1–6, 6–4, 1–6
Win	5–2	Jun 1994	Košice, Slovakia	Challenger	Clay	(United States) Tommy Ho	(Portugal) Emanuel Couto (Portugal) Bernardo Mota	7–6, 6–1
Win	6–2	Jul 1994	Scheveningen, Netherlands	Challenger	Clay	(Sweden) Mårten Renström	(Netherlands) Stephen Noteboom (Belgium) Tom Vanhoudt	3–6, 7–5, 6–3
Win	7–2	Dec 1994	Andorra la Vella, Andorra	Challenger	Hard	(Sweden) Anders Järryd	(Canada) Greg Rusedski (Kenya) Paul Wekesa	7–6, 6–3
Win	8–2	Mar 1995	Indian Wells, United States	Challenger	Hard	(Sweden) Nicklas Kulti	(Sweden) Jan Apell (United States) Mike Bauer	7–6, 6–4
Win	9–2	Apr 1995	Monte Carlo, Monaco	Challenger	Clay	(Sweden) Nicklas Kulti	(Germany) Nicolas Kiefer (Germany) Michael Stich	7–5, 7–5
Win	10–2	May 1995	Ljubljana, Slovenia	Challenger	Clay	(Sweden) Nicklas Kulti	(United States) Shelby Cannon (South Africa) Stefan Kruger	6–4, 6–4
Win	11–2	Jul 1995	Braunschweig, Germany	Challenger	Clay	(Sweden) Nicklas Kulti	(United States) Bill Behrens (South Africa) Brendan Curry	7–6, 6–4

== Performance timelines ==
Key
W	F	SF	QF	#R	RR	Q#	DNQ	A	NH

(W) winner; (F) finalist; (SF) semifinalist; (QF) quarterfinalist; (#R) rounds 4, 3, 2, 1; (RR) round-robin stage; (Q#) qualification round; (DNQ) did not qualify; (A) absent; (NH) not held; (SR) strike rate (events won / competed); (W–L) win–loss record.

=== Singles ===
Tournament	1992	1993	1994	1995	1996	1997	1998	1999	2000	SR	W–L	Win %
Grand Slam tournaments
Australian Open	A	Q1	A	Q2	QF	1R	2R	3R	2R	0 / 5	8–5	62%
French Open	A	Q1	4R	2R	3R	1R	2R	Q3	1R	0 / 6	7–6	54%
Wimbledon	A	A	A	A	3R	1R	2R	1R	1R	0 / 5	3–5	38%
US Open	A	A	A	A	2R	1R	3R	1R	1R	0 / 5	3–5	38%
Win–loss	0–0	0–0	3–1	1–1	9–4	0–4	5–4	2–3	1–4	0 / 21	21–21	50%
Olympic Games
Summer Olympics	A	Not Held			A	Not Held			3R	0 / 1	2–1	67%
ATP Tour Masters 1000
Indian Wells	A	A	A	Q2	A	1R	A	A	A	0 / 1	0–1	0%
Miami	A	A	A	Q2	A	4R	A	1R	1R	0 / 3	3–3	50%
Monte Carlo	QF	A	A	Q2	A	1R	A	A	Q2	0 / 2	2–2	50%
Hamburg	A	A	A	A	A	1R	A	A	A	0 / 1	0–1	0%
Canada	A	A	A	A	3R	A	A	A	A	0 / 1	2–1	67%
Cincinnati	A	A	A	A	A	1R	A	A	A	0 / 1	0–1	0%
Paris	A	A	A	A	Q1	1R	A	A	A	0 / 1	0–1	0%
Win–loss	2–1	0–0	0–0	0–0	2–1	3–6	0–0	0–1	0–1	0 / 10	7–10	41%

=== Doubles ===
Tournament	1993	1994	1995	1996	1997	1998	1999	2000	SR	W–L	Win %
Grand Slam tournaments
Australian Open	1R	A	1R	1R	A	1R	3R	3R	0 / 6	4–6	40%
French Open	2R	1R	1R	A	A	1R	SF	3R	0 / 6	7–6	54%
Wimbledon	A	A	A	A	A	A	1R	SF	0 / 2	4–2	67%
US Open	A	A	A	A	A	3R	1R	3R	0 / 3	4–3	57%
Win–loss	1–2	0–1	0–2	0–1	0–0	2–3	6–4	10–4	0 / 17	19–17	53%
Olympic Games
Summer Olympics	Not Held			A	Not Held			1R	0 / 1	0–1	0%
ATP Tour Masters 1000
Miami	A	A	1R	A	A	A	SF	2R	0 / 3	4–3	0%
Monte Carlo	A	A	2R	A	A	A	A	QF	0 / 2	3–2	60%
Rome	A	A	A	A	A	A	A	2R	0 / 1	1–1	50%
Cincinnati	A	A	A	A	Q2	A	A	A	0 / 0	0–0	–
Stuttgart	A	A	A	A	A	A	1R	1R	0 / 2	0–2	0%
Win–loss	0–0	0–0	1–2	0–0	0–0	0–0	4–2	3–4	0 / 8	8–8	50%
