= Pete Sampras career statistics =

Career finals
Discipline	Type	Won	Lost	Total	WR
Singles	Grand Slam	14	4	18	0.78
Singles	Year-end championships	5	1	6	0.83
Singles	ATP Masters 1000*	11	8	19	0.58
Singles	Summer Olympics	–	–	–	–
Singles	ATP Tour	34	11	45	0.75
Singles	Total	64	24	88	0.73
Doubles	Grand Slam	–	–	–	–
Doubles	Year-end championships	–	–	–	–
Doubles	ATP Masters 1000*	1	0	1	1.00
Doubles	Summer Olympics	–	–	–	–
Doubles	ATP Tour	1	2	3	0.33
Doubles	Total	2	2	4	0.50
Total		66	26	92	0.72
1) WR = winning rate 2) * formerly "Super 9" (1996–1999), "Tennis Masters Series" (2000–2003) or "ATP Masters Series" (2004–2008).

The career of American former tennis player Pete Sampras started when he turned professional in 1988 and lasted until his official retirement in August 2003. During his career Sampras played in 265 official tournaments and won 64 singles titles, including 14 singles titles at Grand Slam events. He competed in 16 ties for the United States Davis Cup team between 1991 and 2002 and was a member of the Davis Cup winning team in 1992 and 1995. Sampras reached the No. 1 ranking on April 12, 1993, and in total held that position for 286 weeks, third all-time. He finished the year as the No. 1 ranked player six consecutive times. His career win–loss record is 762–222 (77.4%).

Sampras is 7–0 in Wimbledon finals and is the only male player to win 3 or more consecutive Wimbledon titles twice in his career (1993–1995, 1997–2000). He was the first men's player to win a 13th and 14th major singles titles. His win–loss record in major finals is unsurpassed at 78% (14 wins in 18 finals) for players who have appeared in at least 10 major finals. He is the only American male player to win more than 10 major titles.

== Singles performance timeline ==
Key
W	F	SF	QF	#R	RR	Q#	DNQ	A	NH

(W) winner; (F) finalist; (SF) semifinalist; (QF) quarterfinalist; (#R) rounds 4, 3, 2, 1; (RR) round-robin stage; (Q#) qualification round; (DNQ) did not qualify; (A) absent; (NH) not held; (SR) strike rate (events won / competed); (W–L) win–loss record.

Tournament	1988	1989	1990	1991	1992	1993	1994	1995	1996	1997	1998	1999	2000	2001	2002	SR	W–L	Win %
Grand Slams
Australian Open	A	1R	4R	A	A	SF	W	F	3R	W	QF	A	SF	4R	4R	2 / 11	45–9	83%
French Open	A	2R	A	2R	QF	QF	QF	1R	SF	3R	2R	2R	1R	2R	1R	0 / 13	24–13	65%
Wimbledon	A	1R	1R	2R	SF	W	W	W	QF	W	W	W	W	4R	2R	7 / 14	63–7	90%
US Open	1R	4R	W	QF	F	W	4R	W	W	4R	SF	A	F	F	W	5 / 14	71–9	89%
Win–loss	0–1	4–4	10–2	6–3	15–3	23–2	21–2	20–2	18–3	19–2	17–3	8–1	18–3	13–4	11–3	14 / 52	203–38	84%
Year-end championship
Tennis Masters Cup	DNQ		RR	W	SF	F	W	SF	W	W	SF	W	SF	DNQ		5 / 11	35–14	71%
Grand Prix			ATP Masters Series															
Indian Wells	3R	3R	2R	A	3R	3R	W	W	QF	2R	3R	2R	QF	F	SF	2 / 14	31–12	72%
Key Biscayne	A	1R	QF	2R	QF	W	W	F	SF	SF	3R	QF	W	3R	3R	3 / 14	42–10	81%
Monte Carlo	A	A	A	A	2R	A	A	2R	A	2R	3R	A	A	A	A	0 / 4	1–4	20%
Rome	A	2R	A	2R	QF	SF	W	1R	A	1R	3R	2R	A	1R	1R	1 / 11	18–10	64%
Hamburg	A	A	A	3R	A	A	A	SF	A	A	A	A	2R	1R	1R	0 / 5	5–5	50%
Toronto / Montreal	A	A	SF	2R	A	3R	A	F	A	A	QF	A	QF	A	3R	0 / 7	15–7	68%
Cincinnati	1R	3R	3R	F	W	SF	A	QF	QF	W	F	W	3R	2R	2R	3 / 14	38–11	78%
Stuttgart^{1}	A	A	SF	QF	SF	2R	SF	SF	F	3R	SF	A	A	QF	A	0 / 10	23–10	70%
Paris	A	A	3R	F	2R	QF	QF	W	2R	W	F	3R	A	A	A	2 / 10	24–7	77%
National representation
Summer Olympics	A	not held			3R	not held			A	not held			A	NH		0 / 1	2–1	67%
Davis Cup	A	A	A	F	W	A	SF	W	A	F	A	QF	SF	A	SF	2 / 8	15–8	65%
Career Statistics
	1988	1989	1990	1991	1992	1993	1994	1995	1996	1997	1998	1999	2000	2001	2002	SR	W–L	Win %
Tournaments	9	19	22	20	21	23	18	21	17	18	22	13	12	15	15	265		
Titles–finals	0–0	0–0	4–4	4–8	5–7	8–9	10–12	5–9	8–9	8–8	4–7	5–5	2–4	0–4	1–2	64 / 265	64–88	73%
Hardcourt win–loss	8–7	13–10	27–8	25–7	25–5	43–6	37–3	37–6	46–4	35–5	30–10	23–5	28–7	26–10	20–8	36 / 137	427–104	80%
Grass win–loss	0–0	2–2	6–2	5–3	7–2	7–1	11–1	12–0	4–1	8–1	8–1	12–0	11–1	6–2	2–3	10 / 29	101–20	83%
Carpet win–loss	2–2	1–4	18–6	19–6	18–4	21–5	17–6	16–5	10–3	10–2	14–3	1–0	1–1	0–0	0–0	15 / 55	144–44	77%
Clay win–loss	0–1	2–3	0–1	3–3	22–8	14–4	12–2	7–5	5–3	2–4	9–3	4–3	2–4	3–4	5–6	3 / 44	90–54	63%
Overall win–loss	10–10	18–19	51–17	52–19	72–19	85–16	77–12	72–16	65–11	55–12	61–17	40–8	42–13	35–16	27–17	64 / 265	762–222	77%
Win %	50%	49%	75%	73%	79%	84%	87%	82%	86%	82%	78%	83%	76%	69%	61%	77%		
Year End Ranking	97	81	5	6	3	1	1	1	1	1	1	3	3	10	13	$43,280,489		

^{1}This event was held in Stockholm through 1994, Essen in 1995, and Stuttgart from 1996 through 2001.

== Grand Slam finals ==
=== Singles: 18 (14 titles, 4 runner-ups) ===
Result	Year	Championship	Surface	Opponent	Score
Win	1990	US Open	Hard	(United States) Andre Agassi	6–4, 6–3, 6–2
Loss	1992	US Open	Hard	(Sweden) Stefan Edberg	6–3, 4–6, 6–7^{(5–7)}, 2–6
Win	1993	Wimbledon	Grass	(United States) Jim Courier	7–6^{(7–3)}, 7–6^{(8–6)}, 3–6, 6–3
Win	1993	US Open (2)	Hard	(France) Cédric Pioline	6–4, 6–4, 6–3
Win	1994	Australian Open	Hard	(United States) Todd Martin	7–6^{(7–4)}, 6–4, 6–4
Win	1994	Wimbledon (2)	Grass	(Croatia) Goran Ivanišević	7–6^{(7–2)}, 7–6^{(7–5)}, 6–0
Loss	1995	Australian Open	Hard	(United States) Andre Agassi	6–4, 1–6, 6–7^{(6–8)}, 4–6
Win	1995	Wimbledon (3)	Grass	(Germany) Boris Becker	6–7^{(5–7)}, 6–2, 6–4, 6–2
Win	1995	US Open (3)	Hard	(United States) Andre Agassi	6–4, 6–3, 4–6, 7–5
Win	1996	US Open (4)	Hard	(United States) Michael Chang	6–1, 6–4, 7–6^{(7–3)}
Win	1997	Australian Open (2)	Hard	(Spain) Carlos Moyá	6–2, 6–3, 6–3
Win	1997	Wimbledon (4)	Grass	(France) Cédric Pioline	6–4, 6–2, 6–4
Win	1998	Wimbledon (5)	Grass	(Croatia) Goran Ivanišević	6–7^{(2–7)}, 7–6^{(11–9)}, 6–4, 3–6, 6–2
Win	1999	Wimbledon (6)	Grass	(United States) Andre Agassi	6–3, 6–4, 7–5
Win	2000	Wimbledon (7)	Grass	(Australia) Patrick Rafter	6–7^{(10–12)}, 7–6^{(7–5)}, 6–4, 6–2
Loss	2000	US Open	Hard	(Russia) Marat Safin	4–6, 3–6, 3–6
Loss	2001	US Open	Hard	(Australia) Lleyton Hewitt	6–7^{(4–7)}, 1–6, 1–6
Win	2002	US Open (5)	Hard	(United States) Andre Agassi	6–3, 6–4, 5–7, 6–4

== Other significant finals ==
=== Year-end championships finals ===
==== Singles: 6 (5 titles, 1 runner-up) ====
Result	Year	Championship	Surface	Opponent	Score
Win	1991	ATP Tour World Championships	Carpet (i)	(United States) Jim Courier	3–6, 7–6^{(7–5)}, 6–3, 6–4
Loss	1993	ATP Tour World Championships	Carpet (i)	(Germany) Michael Stich	6–7^{(3–7)}, 6–2, 6–7^{(7–9)}, 2–6
Win	1994	ATP Tour World Championships	Carpet (i)	(Germany) Boris Becker	4–6, 6–3, 7–5, 6–4
Win	1996	ATP Tour World Championships	Carpet (i)	(Germany) Boris Becker	3–6, 7–6^{(7–5)}, 7–6^{(7–4)}, 6–7^{(11–13)}, 6–4
Win	1997	ATP Tour World Championships	Hard (i)	(Russia) Yevgeny Kafelnikov	6–3, 6–2, 6–2
Win	1999	ATP Tour World Championships	Carpet (i)	(United States) Andre Agassi	6–1, 7–5, 6–4

=== Grand Slam Cup ===
==== Singles: 3 (2 titles, 1 runner-up) ====
Result	Year	Tournament	Surface	Opponent	Score
Win	1990	Grand Slam Cup	Carpet (i)	(United States) Brad Gilbert	6–3, 6–4, 6–2
Loss	1994	Grand Slam Cup	Carpet (i)	(Sweden) Magnus Larsson	6–7^{(6–8)}, 6–4, 6–7^{(5–7)}, 4–6
Win	1997	Grand Slam Cup	Carpet (i)	(Australia) Patrick Rafter	6–2, 6–4, 7–5

=== ATP Super 9 / ATP Masters Series finals ===
==== Singles: 19 (11 titles, 8 runner-ups) ====
Result	Year	Tournament	Surface	Opponent	Score
Loss	1991	Cincinnati Masters	Hard	(France) Guy Forget	6–2, 6–7^{(4–7)}, 4–6
Loss	1991	Paris Masters	Carpet (i)	(France) Guy Forget	6–7^{(9–11)}, 6–4, 7–5, 4–6, 4–6
Win	1992	Cincinnati Masters	Hard	(United States) Ivan Lendl	6–3, 3–6, 6–3
Win	1993	Miami Open	Hard	(United States) MaliVai Washington	6–3, 6–2
Win	1994	Indian Wells Masters	Hard	(Czech Republic) Petr Korda	4–6, 6–3, 3–6, 6–3, 6–2
Win	1994	Miami Open (2)	Hard	(United States) Andre Agassi	5–7, 6–3, 6–3
Win	1994	Italian Open	Clay	(Germany) Boris Becker	6–1, 6–2, 6–2
Win	1995	Indian Wells Masters (2)	Hard	(United States) Andre Agassi	7–5, 6–3, 7–5
Loss	1995	Miami Open	Hard	(United States) Andre Agassi	6–3, 2–6, 6–7^{(6–8)}
Loss	1995	Canada Masters	Hard	(United States) Andre Agassi	6–3, 2–6, 3–6
Win	1995	Paris Masters	Carpet (i)	(Germany) Boris Becker	7–6^{(7–5)}, 6–4, 6–4
Loss	1996	Stuttgart Masters	Carpet (i)	(Germany) Boris Becker	6–3, 3–6, 6–3, 3–6, 4–6
Win	1997	Cincinnati Masters (2)	Hard	(Austria) Thomas Muster	6–3, 6–4
Win	1997	Paris Masters (2)	Carpet (i)	(Sweden) Jonas Björkman	6–3, 4–6, 6–3, 6–1
Loss	1998	Cincinnati Masters	Hard	(Australia) Patrick Rafter	6–1, 6–7^{(2–7)}, 4–6
Loss	1998	Paris Masters	Carpet (i)	(United Kingdom) Greg Rusedski	4–6, 6–7^{(4–7)}, 3–6
Win	1999	Cincinnati Masters (3)	Hard	(Australia) Patrick Rafter	7–6^{(9–7)}, 6–3
Win	2000	Miami Open (3)	Hard	(Brazil) Gustavo Kuerten	6–1, 6–7^{(2–7)}, 7–6^{(7–5)}, 7–6^{(10–8)}
Loss	2001	Indian Wells Masters	Hard	(United States) Andre Agassi	6–7^{(5–7)}, 5–7, 1–6

==== Doubles: 1 (1 title) ====
Result	Year	Tournament	Surface	Partner	Opponents	Score
Win	1989	Italian Open	Clay	(United States) Jim Courier	(Brazil) Danilo Marcelino (Brazil) Mauro Menezes	6–4, 6–3

== Career finals ==
=== Singles: 88 (64 titles, 24 runner-ups) ===
Legend Grand Slam tournaments (14–4) Year-end championships (5–1) Grand Slam Cup (2–1) ATP Masters Series (11–8) ATP International Series Gold (12–1) ATP Tour (20–9)	Titles by surface Hard (35–12) Clay (3–2) Grass (10–3) Carpet (16–7)	Titles by setting Outdoors (41–16) Indoors (23–8)

Wins (64)

Result	W-L	Date	Tournament	Surface	Opponent	Score
Win	1.	Feb 1990	U.S. Pro Indoor, US	Carpet (i)	(Ecuador) Andrés Gómez	7–6^{(7–4)}, 7–5, 6-2
Win	2.	Jun 1990	Manchester Open, UK	Grass	(Israel) Gilad Bloom	7–6^{(11–9)}, 7–6^{(7–3)}
Win	3.	Aug 1990	US Open, US	Hard	(United States) Andre Agassi	6–4, 6–3, 6–2
Win	4.	Dec 1990	Grand Slam Cup, Germany	Carpet (i)	(United States) Brad Gilbert	6–3, 6–4, 6–2
Win	5.	Jul 1991	Los Angeles Open, US	Hard	(United States) Brad Gilbert	6–2, 6–7^{(5–7)}, 6–3
Win	6.	Aug 1991	Indianapolis Open, US	Hard	(Germany) Boris Becker	7–6^{(7–2)}, 3–6, 6–3
Win	7.	Oct 1991	Lyon Grand Prix, France	Carpet (i)	(France) Olivier Delaître	6–1, 6–1
Win	8.	Nov 1991	ATP Finals, Germany	Carpet (i)	(United States) Jim Courier	3–6, 7–6^{(7–5)}, 6–3, 6–4
Win	9.	Feb 1992	US Pro Indoor, US	Carpet (i)	(Israel) Amos Mansdorf	6–1, 7–6^{(7–4)}, 2–6, 7–6^{(7–2)}
Win	10.	Jul 1992	Austrian Open, Austria	Clay	(Argentina) Alberto Mancini	6–3, 7–5, 6–3
Win	11.	Aug 1992	Cincinnati Masters, US	Hard	(United States) Ivan Lendl	6–3, 3–6, 6–3
Win	12.	Aug 1992	Indianapolis Open, US	Hard	(United States) Jim Courier	6–4, 6–4
Win	13.	Oct 1992	Lyon Open, France	Carpet (i)	(France) Cédric Pioline	6–4, 6–2
Win	14.	Jan 1993	Sydney International, Australia	Hard	(Austria) Thomas Muster	7–6^{(9–7)}, 6–1
Win	15.	Mar 1993	Miami Open, US	Hard	(United States) MaliVai Washington	6–3, 6–2
Win	16.	Apr 1993	Japan Open, Japan	Hard	(United States) Brad Gilbert	6–2, 6–2, 6–2
Win	17.	Apr 1993	Hong Kong Open, China	Hard	(United States) Jim Courier	6–3, 6–7^{(1–7)}, 7–6^{(7–2)}
Win	18.	Jun 1993	Wimbledon, UK	Grass	(United States) Jim Courier	7–6^{(7–3)}, 7–6^{(8–6)}, 3–6, 6–3
Win	19.	Aug 1993	US Open, US	Hard	(France) Cédric Pioline	6–4, 6–4, 6–3
Win	20.	Oct 1993	Lyon Open, France	Carpet (i)	(France) Cédric Pioline	7–6^{(7–5)}, 1–6, 7–5
Win	21.	Nov 1993	ECC Antwerp, Belgium	Carpet (i)	(Sweden) Magnus Gustafsson	6–1, 6–4
Win	22.	Jan 1994	Sydney International, Australia	Hard	(United States) Ivan Lendl	7–6^{(7–5)}, 6–4
Win	23.	Jan 1994	Australian Open, Australia	Hard	(United States) Todd Martin	7–6^{(7–4)}, 6–4, 6–4
Win	24.	Feb 1994	Indian Wells Masters, US	Hard	(Czech Republic) Petr Korda	4–6, 6–3, 3–6, 6–3, 6–2
Win	25.	Mar 1994	Miami Open, US	Hard	(United States) Andre Agassi	5–7, 6–3, 6–3
Win	26.	Mar 1994	ATP Osaka, Japan	Hard	(France) Lionel Roux	6–2, 6–2
Win	27.	Apr 1994	Japan Open, Japan	Hard	(United States) Michael Chang	6–4, 6–2
Win	28.	May 1994	Italian Open, Italy	Clay	(Germany) Boris Becker	6–1, 6–2, 6–2
Win	29.	Jun 1994	Wimbledon, UK	Grass	(Croatia) Goran Ivanišević	7–6^{(7–2)}, 7–6^{(7–5)}, 6–0
Win	30.	Nov 1994	ECC Antwerp, Belgium	Carpet (i)	(Sweden) Magnus Larsson	7–6^{(7–5)}, 6–4
Win	31.	Nov 1994	ATP Finals, Germany	Carpet (i)	(Germany) Boris Becker	4–6, 6–3, 7–5, 6–4
Win	32.	Mar 1995	Indian Wells Masters, US	Hard	(United States) Andre Agassi	7–5, 6–3, 7–5
Win	33.	Jun 1995	Queen's Club Championships, UK	Grass	(France) Guy Forget	7–6^{(7–3)}, 7–6^{(8–6)}
Win	34.	Jun 1995	Wimbledon, UK	Grass	(Germany) Boris Becker	6–7^{(5–7)}, 6–2, 6–4, 6–2
Win	35.	Aug 1995	US Open, US	Hard	(United States) Andre Agassi	6–4, 6–3, 4–6, 7–5
Win	36.	Oct 1995	Paris Masters, France	Carpet (i)	(Germany) Boris Becker	7–6^{(7–5)}, 6–4, 6–4
Win	37.	Feb 1996	Pacific Coast Championships, US	Hard (i)	(United States) Andre Agassi	6–2, 6–3
Win	38.	Feb 1996	U.S. National Indoor, US	Hard (i)	(United States) Todd Martin	6–4, 7–6^{(7–2)}
Win	39.	Apr 1996	Hong Kong Open, China	Hard	(United States) Michael Chang	6–4, 3–6, 6–4
Win	40.	Apr 1996	Japan Open, Japan	Hard	(United States) Richey Reneberg	6–4, 7–5
Win	41.	Aug 1996	Indianapolis Tennis Championships, US	Hard	(Croatia) Goran Ivanišević	7–6^{(7–3)}, 7–5
Win	42.	Aug 1996	US Open, US	Hard	(United States) Michael Chang	6–1, 6–4, 7–6^{(7–3)}
Win	43.	Sep 1996	Swiss Indoors, Switzerland	Hard (i)	(Germany) Hendrik Dreekmann	7–5, 6–2, 6–0
Win	44.	Nov 1996	ATP Finals, Germany	Carpet (i)	(Germany) Boris Becker	3–6, 7–6^{(7–5)}, 7–6^{(7–4)}, 6–7^{(11–13)}, 6–4
Win	45.	Jan 1997	Australian Open, Australia	Hard	(Spain) Carlos Moyá	6–2, 6–3, 6–3
Win	46.	Feb 1997	Pacific Coast Championships, US	Hard (i)	(United Kingdom) Greg Rusedski	3–6, 5–0 ret.
Win	47.	Feb 1997	US Pro Indoor, US	Hard (i)	(Australia) Patrick Rafter	5–7, 7–6^{(7–4)}, 6–3
Win	48.	Jun 1997	Wimbledon, UK	Grass	(France) Cédric Pioline	6–4, 6–2, 6–4
Win	49.	Aug 1997	Cincinnati Masters, US	Hard	(Austria) Thomas Muster	6–3, 6–4
Win	50.	Sep 1997	Grand Slam Cup, Germany	Carpet (i)	(Australia) Patrick Rafter	6–2, 6–4, 7–5
Win	51.	Oct 1997	Paris Masters, France	Carpet (i)	(Sweden) Jonas Björkman	6–3, 4–6, 6–3, 6–1
Win	52.	Nov 1997	ATP Finals, Germany	Hard (i)	(Russia) Yevgeny Kafelnikov	6–3, 6–2, 6–2
Win	53.	Feb 1998	US Pro Indoor, US	Hard (i)	(Sweden) Thomas Enqvist	7–5, 7–6^{(7–3)}
Win	54.	Apr 1998	Atlanta Tennis Challenge, US	Clay	(Australia) Jason Stoltenberg	6–7^{(2–7)}, 6–3, 7–6^{(7–4)}
Win	55.	Jun 1998	Wimbledon, UK	Grass	(Croatia) Goran Ivanišević	6–7^{(2–7)}, 7–6^{(11–9)}, 6–4, 3–6, 6–2
Win	56.	Oct 1998	Vienna Open, Austria	Carpet (i)	(Slovakia) Karol Kučera	6–3, 7–6^{(7–3)}, 6–1
Win	57.	Jun 1999	Queen's Club Championships, UK	Grass	(United Kingdom) Tim Henman	6–7^{(1–7)}, 6–4, 7–6^{(7–4)}
Win	58.	Jun 1999	Wimbledon, UK	Grass	(United States) Andre Agassi	6–3, 6–4, 7–5
Win	59.	Jul 1999	Los Angeles Open, US	Hard	(United States) Andre Agassi	7–6^{(7–3)}, 7–6^{(7–1)}
Win	60.	Aug 1999	Cincinnati Masters, US	Hard	(Australia) Patrick Rafter	7–6^{(9–7)}, 6–3
Win	61.	Nov 1999	ATP Finals, Germany	Carpet (i)	(United States) Andre Agassi	6–1, 7–5, 6–4
Win	62.	Mar 2000	Miami Open, US	Hard	(Brazil) Gustavo Kuerten	6–1, 6–7^{(2–7)}, 7–6^{(7–5)}, 7–6^{(10–8)}
Win	63.	Jun 2000	Wimbledon, UK	Grass	(Australia) Patrick Rafter	6–7^{(10–12)}, 7–6^{(7–5)}, 6–4, 6–2
Win	64.	Sep 2002	US Open, US	Hard	(United States) Andre Agassi	6–3, 6–4, 5–7, 6–4

Runner-ups (24)

No.	Date	Tournament	Surface	Opponent	Score
1.	Feb 1991	U.S. Pro Indoor, US	Carpet (i)	(Czech Republic) Ivan Lendl	5–7, 6–4, 6–4, 3–6, 6–3
2.	Jun 1991	Manchester Open, UK	Grass	(Socialist Federal Republic of Yugoslavia) Goran Ivanišević	6–4, 6–4
3.	Aug 1991	Cincinnati Masters, US	Hard	(France) Guy Forget	2–6, 7–6^{(7–4)}, 6–4
4.	Nov 1991	Paris Masters, France	Carpet (i)	(France) Guy Forget	7–6^{(11–9)}, 4–6, 5–7, 6–4, 6–4
5.	May 1992	Atlanta Tennis Challenge, US	Clay	(United States) Andre Agassi	7–5, 6–4
6.	Sep 1992	US Open, US	Hard	(Sweden) Stefan Edberg	3–6, 6–4, 7–6^{(7–5)}, 6–2
7.	Nov 1993	ATP Finals, Germany	Carpet (i)	(Germany) Michael Stich	7–6^{(7–3)}, 2–6, 7–6^{(9–7)}, 6–2
8.	Jun 1994	Queen's Club Championships, UK	Grass	(United States) Todd Martin	7–6^{(7–4)}, 7–6^{(7–4)}
9.	Dec 1994	Grand Slam Cup, Germany	Carpet (i)	(Sweden) Magnus Larsson	7–6^{(8–6)}, 4–6, 7–6^{(7–5)}, 6–4
10.	Jan 1995	Australian Open, Australia	Hard	(United States) Andre Agassi	4–6, 6–1, 7–6^{(8–6)}, 6–4
11.	Mar 1995	Miami Open, US	Hard	(United States) Andre Agassi	3–6, 6–2, 7–6^{(7–4)}
12.	Jul 1995	Canadian Open, Canada	Hard	(United States) Andre Agassi	3–6, 6–2, 6–3
13.	Oct 1995	Lyon Open, France	Carpet (i)	(South Africa) Wayne Ferreira	7–6^{(7–3)}, 5–7, 6–3
14.	Oct 1996	Eurocard Open, Germany	Carpet (i)	(Germany) Boris Becker	3–6, 6–3, 3–6, 6–3, 6–4
15.	Feb 1998	Pacific Coast Championships, US	Hard (i)	(United States) Andre Agassi	6–2, 6–4
16.	Aug 1998	Cincinnati Masters, US	Hard	(Australia) Patrick Rafter	1–6, 7–6^{(7–2)}, 6–4
17.	Nov 1998	Paris Masters, France	Carpet (i)	(United Kingdom) Greg Rusedski	6–4, 7–6^{(7–4)}, 6–3
18.	Jun 2000	Queens Club Championships, UK	Grass	(Australia) Lleyton Hewitt	6–4, 6–4
19.	Sep 2000	US Open, US	Hard	(Russia) Marat Safin	6–4, 6–3, 6–3
20.	Mar 2001	Indian Wells Masters, US	Hard	(United States) Andre Agassi	7–6^{(7–5)}, 7–5, 6–1
21.	Jul 2001	Los Angeles Open, US	Hard	(United States) Andre Agassi	6–4, 6–2
22.	Aug 2001	Connecticut Open, US	Hard	(Germany) Tommy Haas	6–3, 3–6, 6–2
23.	Sep 2001	US Open, US	Hard	(Australia) Lleyton Hewitt	7–6^{(7–4)}, 6–1, 6–1
24.	Apr 2002	U.S. Clay Court Championships, US	Clay	(United States) Andy Roddick	7–6^{(11–9)}, 6–3

=== Doubles: 4 (2 titles, 2 runner-ups) ===
Legend Grand Slam tournaments (0–0) Year-end championships (0–0) Grand Slam Cup (0–0) ATP Masters Series (1–0) ATP International Series Gold (0–0) ATP Tour (1–2)	Titles by surface Hard (0–1) Clay (1–1) Grass (1–0) Carpet (0–0)	Titles by setting Outdoors (2–2) Indoors (0–0)

Result	No.	Date	Tournament	Surface	Partner	Opponent	Score
Win	1.	May 1989	Italian Open, Italy	Clay	(United States) Jim Courier	(Brazil) Danilo Marcelino (Brazil) Mauro Menezes	6–4, 6–3
Loss	1.	May 1989	WCT Tournament of Champions, US	Clay	(United States) Jim Courier	(United States) Rick Leach (United States) Jim Pugh	6–4, 6–2
Loss	2.	Apr 1991	Orlando Tennis Challenge, US	Hard	(Venezuela) Nicolás Pereira	(United States) Luke Jensen (United States) Scott Melville	6–7^{(5–7)}, 7–6^{(8–6)}, 6–3
Win	2.	Jun 1995	Queen's Club Championships, UK	Grass	(United States) Todd Martin	(Sweden) Jan Apell (Sweden) Jonas Björkman	7–6^{(7–5)}, 6–4

=== Team competition: 4 (2 titles, 2 runner-ups) ===
Wins (2)

No.	Date	Tournament	Surface	Partners	Opponents	Score
1.	Dec 4–6, 1992	Davis Cup, Fort Worth, US	Carpet (i)	(United States) Andre Agassi (United States) Jim Courier (United States) John McEnroe	(Switzerland) Marc Rosset (Switzerland) Jakob Hlasek (Switzerland) Thierry Grin (Switzerland) Claudio Mezzadri	3–1
2.	Dec 1–3, 1995	Davis Cup, Moscow, Russia	Clay (i)	(United States) Jim Courier (United States) Todd Martin (United States) Richey Reneberg	(Russia) Andrei Chesnokov (Russia) Andrei Olhovskiy (Russia) Yevgeny Kafelnikov (Russia) Alexander Volkov	3–2

Runners-up (2)

No.	Date	Tournament	Surface	Partners	Opponents	Score
1.	Nov 29 – Dec 1, 1991	Davis Cup, Lyon, France	Carpet (i)	(United States) Andre Agassi (United States) Ken Flach (United States) Robert Seguso	(France) Guy Forget (France) Henri Leconte (France) Arnaud Boetsch (France) Olivier Delaître	3–1
2.	Nov 28–30, 1997	Davis Cup, Gothenburg, Sweden	Carpet (i)	(United States) Michael Chang (United States) Todd Martin (United States) Jonathan Stark	(Sweden) Jonas Björkman (Sweden) Magnus Larsson (Sweden) Nicklas Kulti (Sweden) Thomas Enqvist	5–0

== Top 10 wins ==
Year	1988	1989	1990	1991	1992	1993	1994	1995	1996	1997	1998	1999	2000	2001	2002	Total
Wins	1	1	8	8	10	13	13	14	13	13	6	10	6	5	3	124

#	Player	Rank	Event	Surface	Rd	Score	Sampras Rank
1988
1.	(United States) Tim Mayotte	8	Detroit, United States	Carpet (i)	2R	6–3, 6–4	127
1989
2.	(Sweden) Mats Wilander	5	US Open, New York, United States	Hard	2R	5–7, 6–3, 1–6, 6–1, 6–4	91
1990
3.	(United States) Andre Agassi	6	Philadelphia, United States	Carpet (i)	3R	5–7, 7–5, ret.	32
4.	(United States) Tim Mayotte	8	Philadelphia, United States	Carpet (i)	QF	6–4, 4–6, 6–3	32
5.	(Austria) Thomas Muster	6	US Open, New York, United States	Hard	4R	6–7^{(6–8)}, 7–6^{(7–5)}, 6–4, 6–3	12
6.	(Czechoslovakia) Ivan Lendl	3	US Open, New York, United States	Hard	QF	6–4, 7–6^{(7–4)}, 3–6, 4–6, 6–2	12
7.	(United States) Andre Agassi	4	US Open, New York, United States	Hard	F	6–4, 6–3, 6–2	12
8.	(Spain) Emilio Sánchez	8	ATP Tour World Championships, Frankfurt, Germany	Carpet (i)	RR	6–2, 6–4	5
9.	(Socialist Federal Republic of Yugoslavia) Goran Ivanišević	9	Grand Slam Cup, Munich, Germany	Carpet (i)	QF	7–6^{(7–2)}, 6–7^{(5–7)}, 8–6	5
10.	(United States) Brad Gilbert	10	Grand Slam Cup, Munich, Germany	Carpet (i)	F	6–3, 6–4, 6–2	5
1991
11.	(Sweden) Stefan Edberg	2	Cincinnati, United States	Hard	QF	6–3, 6–3	8
12.	(United States) Jim Courier	5	Cincinnati, United States	Hard	SF	6–2, 7–5	8
13.	(United States) Jim Courier	5	Indianapolis, United States	Hard	SF	6–3, 7–6^{(9–7)}	8
14.	(Germany) Boris Becker	1	Indianapolis, United States	Hard	F	7–6^{(7–2)}, 3–6, 6–3	8
15.	(Germany) Michael Stich	4	ATP Tour World Championships, Frankfurt, Germany	Carpet (i)	RR	6–2, 7–6^{(7–3)}	7
16.	(United States) Andre Agassi	8	ATP Tour World Championships, Frankfurt, Germany	Carpet (i)	RR	6–3, 1–6, 6–3	7
17.	(Czech Republic) Ivan Lendl	5	ATP Tour World Championships, Frankfurt, Germany	Carpet (i)	SF	6–2, 6–3	7
18.	(United States) Jim Courier	2	ATP Tour World Championships, Frankfurt, Germany	Carpet (i)	F	3–6, 7–6^{(7–5)}, 6–3, 6–4	7
1992
19.	(Germany) Michael Stich	4	Wimbledon, London, England	Grass	QF	6–3, 6–2, 6–4	3
20.	(Czechoslovakia) Petr Korda	6	Cincinnati, United States	Hard	QF	6–3, 6–3	3
21.	(Sweden) Stefan Edberg	2	Cincinnati, United States	Hard	SF	6–2, 6–3	3
22.	(Germany) Boris Becker	9	Indianapolis, United States	Hard	SF	6–7^{(3–7)}, 6–2, 7–6^{(7–3)}	3
23.	(United States) Jim Courier	1	Indianapolis, United States	Hard	F	6–4, 6–4	3
24.	(United States) Jim Courier	1	US Open, New York, United States	Hard	SF	6–1, 3–6, 6–2, 6–2	3
25.	(Czechoslovakia) Petr Korda	5	Stockholm, Sweden	Carpet (i)	QF	7–6^{(7–4)}, 5–7, 6–3	2
26.	(Germany) Boris Becker	7	ATP Tour World Championships, Frankfurt, Germany	Carpet (i)	RR	7–6^{(7–5)}, 7–6^{(7–3)}	3
27.	(Sweden) Stefan Edberg	2	ATP Tour World Championships, Frankfurt, Germany	Carpet (i)	RR	6–3, 3–6, 7–5	3
28.	(Czechoslovakia) Petr Korda	6	ATP Tour World Championships, Frankfurt, Germany	Carpet (i)	RR	3–6, 6–3, 6–3	3
1993
29.	(Czech Republic) Petr Korda	5	Miami, United States	Hard	F	6–3, 2–6, 6–2	2
30.	(United States) Jim Courier	2	Hong Kong, British Empire	Hard	F	6–3, 6–7^{(1–7)}, 7–6^{(7–2)}	1
31.	(Germany) Michael Stich	10	World Team Cup, Düsseldorf, Germany	Clay	F	6–4, 6–2	1
32.	(Germany) Boris Becker	4	Wimbledon, London, England	Grass	SF	7–6^{(7–5)}, 6–4, 6–4	1
33.	(United States) Jim Courier	2	Wimbledon, London, England	Grass	F	7–6^{(7–3)}, 7–6^{(8–6)}, 3–6, 6–3	1
34.	(United States) Michael Chang	7	US Open, New York, United States	Hard	QF	6–7^{(0–7)}, 7–6^{(7–2)}, 6–1, 6–1	2
35.	(France) Cédric Pioline	10	Lyon, France	Carpet (i)	F	7–6^{(7–5)}, 1–6, 7–5	1
36.	(Croatia) Goran Ivanišević	8	ATP Tour World Championships, Frankfurt, Germany	Carpet (i)	RR	6–3, 4–6, 6–2	1
37.	(Sweden) Stefan Edberg	5	ATP Tour World Championships, Frankfurt, Germany	Carpet (i)	RR	6–3, 7–6^{(7–3)}	1
38.	(Spain) Sergi Bruguera	4	ATP Tour World Championships, Frankfurt, Germany	Carpet (i)	RR	6–3, 1–6, 6–3	1
39.	(Ukraine) Andrei Medvedev	6	ATP Tour World Championships, Frankfurt, Germany	Carpet (i)	SF	6–3, 6–0	1
40.	(Austria) Thomas Muster	9	Grand Slam Cup, Munich, Germany	Carpet (i)	1R	6–3, 6–1	1
41.	(United States) Michael Chang	8	Grand Slam Cup, Munich, Germany	Carpet (i)	QF	7–6, 6–3	1
1994
42.	(United States) Jim Courier	3	Australian Open, Melbourne, Australia	Hard	SF	6–3, 6–4, 6–4	1
43.	(Sweden) Stefan Edberg	4	Indian Wells, United States	Hard	SF	6–3, 3–6, 6–4	1
44.	(United States) Jim Courier	5	Miami, United States	Hard	SF	6–4, 7–6^{(12–10)}	1
45.	(United States) Michael Chang	9	Tokyo, Japan	Hard	F	6–4, 6–2	1
46.	(United States) Michael Chang	8	Wimbledon, London, England	Grass	QF	6–4, 6–1, 6–3	1
47.	(United States) Todd Martin	9	Wimbledon, London, England	Grass	SF	6–4, 6–4, 3–6, 6–3	1
48.	(Croatia) Goran Ivanišević	5	Wimbledon, London, England	Grass	F	7–6^{(7–2)}, 7–6^{(7–5)}, 6–0	1
49.	(Sweden) Stefan Edberg	8	ATP Tour World Championships, Frankfurt, Germany	Carpet (i)	RR	4–6, 6–3, 7–6^{(7–3)}	1
50.	(Croatia) Goran Ivanišević	4	ATP Tour World Championships, Frankfurt, Germany	Carpet (i)	RR	6–3, 6–4	1
51.	(United States) Andre Agassi	2	ATP Tour World Championships, Frankfurt, Germany	Carpet (i)	SF	4–6, 7–6^{(7–5)}, 6–3	1
52.	(Germany) Boris Becker	5	ATP Tour World Championships, Frankfurt, Germany	Carpet (i)	F	4–6, 6–3, 7–5, 6–4	1
53.	(United States) Michael Chang	6	Grand Slam Cup, Munich, Germany	Carpet (i)	QF	6–4, 6–3	1
54.	(Croatia) Goran Ivanišević	5	Grand Slam Cup, Munich, Germany	Carpet (i)	SF	5–7, 6–3, 6–4, 6–7, 10–8	1
1995
55.	(United States) Michael Chang	6	Australian Open, Melbourne, Australia	Hard	SF	6–7^{(6–8)}, 6–3, 6–4, 6–4	1
56.	(United States) Andre Agassi	2	Indian Wells, United States	Hard	F	7–5, 6–3, 7–5	1
57.	(South Africa) Wayne Ferreira	6	Hamburg, Germany	Clay	QF	6–2, 6–2	2
58.	(Croatia) Goran Ivanišević	6	Wimbledon, London, England	Grass	SF	7–6^{(9–7)}, 4–6, 6–3, 4–6, 6–3	2
59.	(Germany) Boris Becker	4	Wimbledon, London, England	Grass	F	6–7^{(5–7)}, 6–2, 6–4, 6–2	2
60.	(Germany) Michael Stich	9	Montreal, Canada	Hard	QF	7–6^{(7–3)}, 6–2	2
61.	(United States) Andre Agassi	1	US Open, New York, United States	Hard	F	6–4, 6–3, 4–6, 7–5	2
62.	(Sweden) Stefan Edberg	8	Davis Cup, Las Vegas, United States	Hard	RR	6–3, 6–4, 3–6, 6–3	2
63.	(United States) Jim Courier	8	Essen, Germany	Carpet (i)	QF	6–2, 7–6^{(8–6)}	2
64.	(United States) Jim Courier	7	Paris, France	Hard (i)	SF	6–4, 3–6, 6–3	2
65.	(Germany) Boris Becker	5	Paris, France	Hard (i)	F	7–6^{(7–5)}, 6–4, 6–4	2
66.	(Russia) Yevgeny Kafelnikov	6	ATP Tour World Championships, Frankfurt, Germany	Carpet (i)	RR	6–3, 6–3	1
67.	(Germany) Boris Becker	5	ATP Tour World Championships, Frankfurt, Germany	Carpet (i)	RR	6–2, 7–6^{(7–3)}	1
68.	(Russia) Yevgeny Kafelnikov	6	Davis Cup, Moscow, Russia	Clay (i)	RR	6–2, 6–4, 7–6^{(7–4)}	1
1996
69.	(United States) Andre Agassi	3	San Jose, United States	Hard (i)	F	6–2, 6–3	2
70.	(United States) Michael Chang	5	Memphis, United States	Hard (i)	SF	6–3, 6–2	1
71.	(United States) Michael Chang	4	Hong Kong, British Empire	Hard	F	6–4, 3–6, 6–4	2
72.	(United States) Jim Courier	8	French Open, Paris, France	Clay	QF	6–7^{(4–7)}, 4–6, 6–4, 6–4, 6–4	1
73.	(Croatia) Goran Ivanišević	7	Indianapolis, United States	Hard	F	7–6^{(7–5)}, 7–5	1
74.	(Croatia) Goran Ivanišević	6	US Open, New York, United States	Hard	SF	6–3, 6–4, 6–7^{(9–11)}, 6–3	1
75.	(United States) Michael Chang	3	US Open, New York, United States	Hard	F	6–1, 6–4, 7–6^{(7–3)}	1
76.	(Russia) Yevgeny Kafelnikov	5	Basel, Switzerland	Hard (i)	SF	7–6^{(7–4)}, 6–3	1
77.	(United States) Andre Agassi	9	Stuttgart, Germany	Carpet (i)	QF	6–4, 6–1	1
78.	(United States) Andre Agassi	7	ATP Tour World Championships, Hanover, Germany	Carpet (i)	RR	6–2, 6–1	1
79.	(Russia) Yevgeny Kafelnikov	3	ATP Tour World Championships, Hanover, Germany	Carpet (i)	RR	6–4, 6–4	1
80.	(Croatia) Goran Ivanišević	4	ATP Tour World Championships, Hanover, Germany	Carpet (i)	SF	6–7^{(6–8)}, 7–6^{(7–4)}, 7–5	1
81.	(Germany) Boris Becker	6	ATP Tour World Championships, Hanover, Germany	Carpet (i)	F	3–6, 7–6^{(7–5)}, 7–6^{(7–4)}, 6–7^{(11–13)} 6–4	1
1997
82.	(Austria) Thomas Muster	5	Australian Open, Melbourne, Australia	Hard	SF	6–1, 7–6^{(7–3)}, 6–3	1
83.	(Russia) Yevgeny Kafelnikov	6	Cincinnati, United States	Hard	QF	6–2, 6–2	1
84.	(Austria) Thomas Muster	4	Cincinnati, United States	Hard	F	6–3, 6–4	1
85.	(Australia) Patrick Rafter	3	Davis Cup, Washington, United States	Hard	RR	6–7^{(6–8)}, 6–1, 6–1, 6–4	1
86.	(United Kingdom) Greg Rusedski	10	Grand Slam Cup, Munich, Germany	Carpet (i)	SF	3–6, 7–6, 7–6, 6–2	1
87.	(Australia) Patrick Rafter	3	Grand Slam Cup, Munich, Germany	Carpet (i)	F	6–2, 6–4, 7–5	1
88.	(Czech Republic) Petr Korda	8	Paris, France	Hard (i)	3R	4–6, 7–6^{(7–2)}, 6–4	1
89.	(Russia) Yevgeny Kafelnikov	6	Paris, France	Hard (i)	SF	7–6^{(7–2)}, 6–3	1
90.	(Sweden) Jonas Björkman	10	Paris, France	Hard (i)	F	6–3, 4–6, 6–3, 6–1	1
91.	(United Kingdom) Greg Rusdeski	5	ATP Tour World Championships, Hanover, Germany	Hard (i)	RR	6–4, 7–5	1
92.	(Australia) Patrick Rafter	3	ATP Tour World Championships, Hanover, Germany	Hard (i)	RR	6–4, 6–1	1
93.	(Sweden) Jonas Björkman	5	ATP Tour World Championships, Hanover, Germany	Hard (i)	SF	6–3, 6–4	1
94.	(Russia) Yevgeny Kafelnikov	6	ATP Tour World Championships, Hanover, Germany	Hard (i)	F	6–3, 6–2, 6–2	1
1998
95.	(Slovakia) Karol Kučera	9	US Open, New York, United States	Hard	QF	6–3, 7–5, 6–4	1
96.	(United Kingdom) Tim Henman	10	Vienna, Austria	Carpet (i)	QF	6–0, 6–3	1
97.	(Slovakia) Karol Kučera	7	Vienna, Austria	Carpet (i)	F	6–3, 7–6^{(7–3)}, 6–1	1
98.	(Russia) Yevgeny Kafelnikov	10	ATP Tour World Championships, Hanover, Germany	Hard (i)	RR	6–2, 6–4	1
99.	(Spain) Carlos Moyá	5	ATP Tour World Championships, Hanover, Germany	Hard (i)	RR	6–3, 6–3	1
100.	(Slovakia) Karol Kučera	7	ATP Tour World Championships, Hanover, Germany	Hard (i)	RR	6–2, 6–1	1
1999
101.	(United Kingdom) Tim Henman	6	Queen's Club, London, England	Grass	F	6–7^{(1–7)}, 6–4, 7–6^{(7–4)}	3
102.	(United Kingdom) Tim Henman	6	Wimbledon, London, England	Grass	SF	3–6, 6–4, 6–3, 6–4	1
103.	(United States) Andre Agassi	4	Wimbledon, London, England	Grass	F	6–3, 6–4, 7–5	1
104.	(United States) Andre Agassi	3	Los Angeles, United States	Hard	F	7–6^{(7–3)}, 7–6^{(7–1)}	2
105.	(United States) Andre Agassi	3	Cincinnati, United States	Hard	SF	7–6^{(9–7)}, 6–4	1
106.	(Australia) Patrick Rafter	4	Cincinnati, United States	Hard	F	7–6^{(9–7)}, 6–3	1
107.	(Brazil) Gustavo Kuerten	3	ATP Tour World Championships, Hanover, Germany	Hard (i)	RR	6–2, 6–3	5
108.	(Ecuador) Nicolás Lapentti	8	ATP Tour World Championships, Hanover, Germany	Hard (i)	RR	7–6^{(7–2)}, 7–6^{(7–5)}	5
109.	(Germany) Nicolas Kiefer	6	ATP Tour World Championships, Hanover, Germany	Hard (i)	SF	6–3, 6–3	5
110.	(United States) Andre Agassi	1	ATP Tour World Championships, Hanover, Germany	Hard (i)	F	6–1, 7–5, 6–4	5
2000
111.	(Ecuador) Nicolás Lapentti	9	Miami, United States	Hard	QF	6–4, 7–6^{(7–3)}	2
112.	(Brazil) Gustavo Kuerten	6	Miami, United States	Hard	F	6–1, 6–7^{(2–7)}, 7–6^{(7–5)}, 7–6^{(10–8)}	2
113.	(Sweden) Magnus Norman	3	World Team Cup, Düsseldorf, Germany	Clay	RR	6–3, 6–4	2
114.	(Australia) Lleyton Hewitt	9	US Open, New York, United States	Hard	SF	7–6^{(9–7)}, 6–4, 7–6^{(7–5)}	4
115.	(Spain) Àlex Corretja	7	Tennis Masters Cup, Lisbon, Portugal	Hard (i)	RR	7–6^{(7–2)}, 7–5	3
116.	(Russia) Marat Safin	1	Tennis Masters Cup, Lisbon, Portugal	Hard (i)	RR	6–3, 6–2	3
2001
117.	(Russia) Yevgeny Kafelnikov	6	Indian Wells, United States	Hard	SF	7–5, 6–4	3
118.	(France) Sébastien Grosjean	10	World Team Cup, Düsseldorf, Germany	Clay	RR	6–3, 3–6, 6–3	5
119.	(Australia) Patrick Rafter	6	US Open, New York, United States	Hard	4R	6–3, 6–2, 6–7^{(5–7)}, 6–4	10
120.	(United States) Andre Agassi	2	US Open, New York, United States	Hard	QF	6–7^{(7–9)}, 7–6^{(7–2)}, 7–6^{(7–2)}, 7–6^{(7–5)}	10
121.	(Russia) Marat Safin	3	US Open, New York, United States	Hard	SF	6–3, 7–6^{(7–5)}, 6–3	10
2002
122.	(United States) Andre Agassi	10	Houston, United States	Clay	SF	6–1, 7–5	14
123.	(Germany) Tommy Haas	3	US Open, New York, United States	Hard	4R	7–5, 6–4, 6–7^{(5–7)}, 7–5	17
124.	(United States) Andre Agassi	6	US Open, New York, United States	Hard	F	6–3, 6–4, 5–7, 6–4	17

== ATP Tour career earnings ==
Year	Majors	ATP wins	Total wins	Earnings ($)	Money list rank
1997	2	6	8	6,498,311	1
1998	1	3	4	3,931,497	1
1999	1	4	5	2,816,406	2
2000	1	1	2	2,254,598	5
2001	0	0	0	994,331	11
2002	1	0	1	1,222,999	12
Career	14	50	64	$43,280,489	5

== Senior tour titles ==
- 2007: Champions Cup Boston – defeated Todd Martin 6–3, 5–7, [11–9]
- 2007: The Championships at the Palisades – defeated Martin 6–3, 6–4
- 2007: Champions Cup Athens – defeated Martin 6–3, 1–6, [10–6]
- 2009: Champions Cup Boston – defeated John McEnroe 7–6(10), 6–4
- 2009: The Del Mar Development Champions Cup, Mexico – defeated Patrick Rafter 7–6(6), 6–4
