= 1996 European Community Championships – Singles =

Singles
- 1996 European Community Championships

Final
- Champion: (Germany) Michael Stich
- Runner-up: (Croatia) Goran Ivanišević
- Score: 6–3, 6–2, 7–6^{(7–5)}

Details
- Draw: 32
- Seeds: 8

Events
Singles	Doubles
← 1994 ·	European Community Championships	· 1997 →

Michael Stich won in the final 6–3, 6–2, 7–6^{(7–5)} against Goran Ivanišević.

== Seeds ==
A champion seed is indicated in bold text while text in italics indicates the round in which that seed was eliminated.

1. (Germany) Boris Becker (semifinals)
2. (Russia) Yevgeny Kafelnikov (first round)
3. (Croatia) Goran Ivanišević (final)
4. (Netherlands) Richard Krajicek (quarterfinals)
5. (Spain) Sergi Bruguera (first round)
6. (Germany) **Michael Stich (champion)**
7. (France) Arnaud Boetsch (first round)
8. (Switzerland) Marc Rosset (quarterfinals)

== Draw ==
=== Key ===
- Q = Qualifier
- WC = Wild card
- LL = Lucky loser
- Alt = Alternate
- SE = Special exempt
- PR = Protected ranking
- ITF = ITF entry
- JE = Junior exempt
- w/o = Walkover
- r = Retired
- d = Defaulted
- SR = Special ranking
- NB: The Final was the best of 5 sets while all other rounds were the best of 3 sets.

=== Final ===
Final
3	(Croatia) Goran Ivanišević	3	2	6^{5}
6	(Germany) **Michael Stich**	**6**	**6**	**7^{7}**

=== Section 1 ===
First round
WC/1	(Germany) **B Becker**	**6**	**6**
(Czech Republic) M Damm	4	4
(Germany) D Prinosil	4	5
Q	(Russia) **A Olhovskiy**	**6**	**7**
WC	(Russia) A Cherkasov	4	4
(Sweden) **J Björkman**	**6**	**6**
(Spain) **F Clavet**	**6**	**6**
7	(France) A Boetsch	2	4
3	(Croatia) **G Ivanišević**	**6**	**7^{7}**
(France) C Pioline	4	6^{4}
(Spain) J Sánchez	3	2
WC	(Belgium) **F Dewulf**	**6**	**6**
(Switzerland) J Hlasek	3	6^{2}
(Netherlands) **J Siemerink**	**6**	**7^{7}**
(Italy) **R Furlan**	**6**	**6**
5	(Spain) S Bruguera	4	3

Second round
WC/1	(Germany) **B Becker**	3	**6**	**6**
Q	(Russia) A Olhovskiy	**6**	4	1
(Sweden) J Björkman	6^{1}	**3**
(Spain) **F Clavet**	**7^{7}**	**6**
3	(Croatia) **G Ivanišević**	**6**	**6**
WC	(Belgium) F Dewulf	2	3
(Netherlands) J Siemerink	4	6^{3}
(Italy) **R Furlan**	**6**	**7^{7}**

Quarterfinals
WC/1	(Germany) **B Becker**	**6**	**6**
(Spain) F Clavet	3	3
3	(Croatia) **G Ivanišević**	4	**7^{7}**	**6**
(Italy) R Furlan	**6**	6^{4}	2

Semifinals
WC/1	(Germany) B Becker	4	6^{5}
3	(Croatia) **G Ivanišević**	**6**	**7^{7}**

=== Section 2 ===
First round
6	(Germany) **M Stich**	**6**	**7^{7}**
(Czech Republic) D Vacek	4	6^{2}
(Spain) J Arrese	2	r
Q	(Belgium) **J van Herck**	**4**
Q	(Slovakia) **K Kučera**	**6**	4	**7**
(Czech Republic) B Ulihrach	1	**6**	5
(United States) P McEnroe	6^{3}	3
4	(Netherlands) **R Krajicek**	**7^{7}**	**6**
8	(Switzerland) **M Rosset**	**6**	**6**
Q	(Germany) A Mronz	1	4
(Germany) M Sinner	4	4
(Russia) **A Volkov**	**6**	**6**
(Spain) A Costa	3	1
(Romania) **A Voinea**	**6**	**6**
(Ukraine) **A Medvedev**	**6**	**6**
2	(Russia) Y Kafelnikov	1	3

Second round
6	(Germany) **M Stich**	**7^{7}**	**6**
Q	(Belgium) J van Herck	6^{3}	4
Q	(Slovakia) K Kučera	4	4
4	(Netherlands) **R Krajicek**	**6**	**6**
8	(Switzerland) **M Rosset**	**6**	**6**
(Russia) A Volkov	3	3
(Romania) A Voinea	3	3
(Ukraine) **A Medvedev**	**6**	**6**

Quarterfinals
6	(Germany) **M Stich**	**6**	**7^{7}**
4	(Netherlands) R Krajicek	3	6^{4}
8	(Switzerland) M Rosset	**6**	6^{2}	3
(Ukraine) **A Medvedev**	4	**7^{7}**	**6**

Semifinals
6	(Germany) **M Stich**	**6**	**6**
(Ukraine) A Medvedev	4	1
