= 1994 European Community Championships =

Tennis tournament

- Date: 7–13 November
- Edition: 13th
- Category: World Series
- Draw: 32S / 16D
- Prize money: $1,100,000
- Surface: Carpet / indoor
- Location: Antwerp, Belgium
- Venue: Sportpaleis Antwerp

Champions

Singles
- (United States) Pete Sampras

Doubles
- (Sweden) Jan Apell / (Sweden) Jonas Björkman
← 1993 ·	European Community Championships	· 1996 →

The 1994 European Community Championships was a men's tennis tournament played on indoor carpet courts at the Sportpaleis Antwerp in Antwerp in Belgium and was part of the World Series of the 1994 ATP Tour. It was the 13th edition of the tournament and was held from 7 November through 13 November 1994. First-seeded Pete Sampras won his second consecutive singles title at the event.

== Finals ==
=== Singles ===
(United States) Pete Sampras defeated (Sweden) Magnus Larsson 7–6^{(7–5)}, 6–4

- It was Sampras' 9th singles title of the year and the 30th of his career.

=== Doubles ===
(Sweden) Jan Apell / (Sweden) Jonas Björkman defeated (Netherlands) Hendrik Jan Davids / (Canada) Sébastien Lareau 4–6, 6–1, 6–2

- It was Apell's 5th doubles title of the year and the 6th of his career. It was Björkman's 6th doubles title of the year and of his career.
