= 1993 European Community Championships =

Tennis tournament

- Date: 8–14 November
- Edition: 12th
- Category: World Series
- Draw: 32S / 16D
- Prize money: $1,085,000
- Surface: Carpet / indoor
- Location: Antwerp, Belgium
- Venue: Sportpaleis Antwerp

Champions

Singles
- (United States) Pete Sampras

Doubles
- (Canada) Grant Connell / (United States) Patrick Galbraith
← 1992 ·	European Community Championships	· 1994 →

The 1993 European Community Championships was a men's tennis tournament played on indoor carpet courts at the Sportpaleis Antwerp in Antwerp in Belgium and was part of the World Series of the 1993 ATP Tour. It was the 12th edition of the tournament and was held from 4 November through 14 November 1993. First-seeded Pete Sampras won the singles title.

== Finals ==
=== Singles ===
(United States) Pete Sampras defeated (Sweden) Magnus Gustafsson 6–1, 6–4

- It was Sampras' 8th singles title of the year and the 21st of his career.

=== Doubles ===
(Canada) Grant Connell / (United States) Patrick Galbraith defeated (South Africa) Wayne Ferreira / (Spain) Javier Sánchez 6–3, 7–6

- It was Connell's 3rd doubles title of the year and the 7th of his career. It was Galbraith's 3rd doubles title of the year and the 15th of his career.
