= 1994 European Community Championships – Doubles =

Doubles
- 1994 European Community Championships

Final
- Champions: (Sweden) Jan Apell (Sweden) Jonas Björkman
- Runners-up: (Netherlands) Hendrik Jan Davids (Canada) Sébastien Lareau
- Score: 4–6, 6–1, 6–2

Details
- Draw: 16 (3WC/1Q)
- Seeds: 4

Events
Singles	Doubles
← 1993 ·	ECC Antwerp	· 1996 →

Grant Connell and Patrick Galbraith were the defending champions, but lost in the quarterfinals to Olivier Delaître and Jim Grabb.

Jan Apell and Jonas Björkman won the title by defeating Hendrik Jan Davids and Sébastien Lareau 4–6, 6–1, 6–2 in the final.

== Seeds ==
1. (Zimbabwe) Byron Black / (United States) Jonathan Stark (first round)
2. (Canada) Grant Connell / (United States) Patrick Galbraith (quarterfinals)
3. (Australia) Todd Woodbridge / (Australia) Mark Woodforde (semifinals)
4. (Sweden) Jan Apell / (Sweden) Jonas Björkman (champions)

== Draw ==
=== Key ===
- Q = Qualifier
- WC = Wild card
- LL = Lucky loser
- Alt = Alternate
- SE = Special exempt
- PR = Protected ranking
- ITF = ITF entry
- JE = Junior exempt
- w/o = Walkover
- r = Retired
- d = Defaulted
- SR = Special ranking

=== Draw ===
First round
1	(Zimbabwe) B Black (United States) J Stark	7	3	4
(Sweden) N Kulti (Sweden) M Larsson	6	6	6
Q	(Latvia) Ģ Dzelde (Czech Republic) V Flégl	2	3
(Netherlands) HJ Davids (Canada) S Lareau	6	6
3	(Australia) T Woodbridge (Australia) M Woodforde	6	6
(Australia) M Kratzmann (Spain) J Sánchez	4	3
(United States) A O'Brien (Australia) S Stolle	7	7
(Netherlands) T Nijssen (Czech Republic) C Suk	6	6
(Sweden) A Järryd (Netherlands) M Oosting	3	6	7
WC	(Netherlands) R Krajicek (Australia) P Rafter	6	3	6
(United States) P McEnroe (United States) J Palmer	4	6
4	(Sweden) J Apell (Sweden) J Björkman	6	7
WC	(United States) L Jensen (United States) R Reneberg	4	2
(France) O Delaître (United States) J Grabb	6	6
WC	(Belgium) F Dewulf (Belgium) L Pimek	3	6	3
2	(Canada) G Connell (United States) P Galbraith	6	3	6

Quarterfinals
(Sweden) N Kulti (Sweden) M Larsson	6	1
(Netherlands) HJ Davids (Canada) S Lareau	7	6
3	(Australia) T Woodbridge (Australia) M Woodforde	6	7
(United States) A O'Brien (Australia) S Stolle	3	6
(Sweden) A Järryd (Netherlands) M Oosting	6	4
4	(Sweden) J Apell (Sweden) J Björkman	7	6
(France) O Delaître (United States) J Grabb	7	6
2	(Canada) G Connell (United States) P Galbraith	6	3

Semifinals
(Netherlands) HJ Davids (Canada) S Lareau	6	3	6
3	(Australia) T Woodbridge (Australia) M Woodforde	4	6	2
4	(Sweden) J Apell (Sweden) J Björkman	6	6
(France) O Delaître (United States) J Grabb	3	4

Final
(Netherlands) HJ Davids (Canada) S Lareau	6	1	2
4	(Sweden) J Apell (Sweden) J Björkman	4	6	6
