= 1996 European Community Championships – Doubles =

Doubles
- 1996 European Community Championships

Final
- Champions: (Sweden) Jonas Björkman (Sweden) Nicklas Kulti
- Runners-up: (Russia) Yevgeny Kafelnikov (Netherlands) Menno Oosting
- Score: 6–4, 6–4

Details
- Draw: 16
- Seeds: 4

Events
| Singles | Doubles |
| ← 1994 · | European Community Championships | · 1997 → |

Jonas Björkman and Nicklas Kulti won in the final 6–4, 6–4 against Yevgeny Kafelnikov and Menno Oosting.

== Seeds ==
Champion seeds are indicated in bold text while text in italics indicates the round in which those seeds were eliminated.

1. (United States) Patrick Galbraith / (Russia) Andrei Olhovskiy (first round)
2. (Czech Republic) Cyril Suk / (Czech Republic) Daniel Vacek (quarterfinals)
3. (United States) Patrick McEnroe / (Australia) Sandon Stolle (quarterfinals)
4. (Russia) Yevgeny Kafelnikov / (Netherlands) Menno Oosting (final)

== Draw ==
=== Key ===
- Q = Qualifier
- WC = Wild card
- LL = Lucky loser
- Alt = Alternate
- SE = Special exempt
- PR = Protected ranking
- ITF = ITF entry
- JE = Junior exempt
- w/o = Walkover
- r = Retired
- d = Defaulted
- SR = Special ranking

First round
1 | (United States) P Galbraith (Russia) A Olhovskiy | 2 | 4
(Netherlands) **H J Davids** (South Africa) **E Ferreira** | **6** | **6**
(Argentina) L Lobo (Spain) J Sánchez | 3 | 3
WC | (Germany) **B Becker** (Germany) **P Kühnen** | **6** | **6**
4 | (Russia) **Y Kafelnikov** (Netherlands) **M Oosting** | **6** | **6**
(Australia) W Arthurs (Belgium) L Pimek | 3 | 4
(Germany) **M-K Goellner** (South Africa) **B Talbot** | **7** | **7**
(United Kingdom) N Broad (South Africa) P Norval | 6 | 6
WC | (Netherlands) R Krajicek (Netherlands) J Siemerink | 6 | 5
(Sweden) **J Björkman** (Sweden) **N Kulti** | **7** | **7**
(South Africa) J-L de Jager (South Africa) G Muller | 6 | 5
3 | (United States) **P McEnroe** (Australia) **S Stolle** | **7** | **7**
Q | (South Africa) D Adams (Australia) A Kratzmann | 3 | 4
(Czech Republic) **M Damm** (Sweden) **P Nyborg** | **6** | **6**
WC | (Belgium) F Dewulf (Belgium) J van Herck | 5 | 3
2 | (Czech Republic) **C Suk** (Czech Republic) **D Vacek** | **7** | **6**

Quarterfinals
(Netherlands) H J Davids (South Africa) E Ferreira | 6 | 6
WC | (Germany) **B Becker** (Germany) **P Kühnen** | **7** | **7**
4 | (Russia) **Y Kafelnikov** (Netherlands) **M Oosting** | **6** | **6**
(Germany) M-K Goellner (South Africa) B Talbot | 3 | 2
(Sweden) **J Björkman** (Sweden) **N Kulti** | 1 | **6** | **7**
3 | (United States) P McEnroe (Australia) S Stolle | **6** | 3 | 5
(Czech Republic) **M Damm** (Sweden) **P Nyborg** | **7** | **7**
2 | (Czech Republic) C Suk (Czech Republic) D Vacek | 5 | 5

Semifinals
WC | (Germany) B Becker (Germany) P Kühnen | **6** | 4 | 3
4 | (Russia) **Y Kafelnikov** (Netherlands) **M Oosting** | 2 | **6** | **6**
(Sweden) **J Björkman** (Sweden) **N Kulti** | **6** | **7**
(Czech Republic) M Damm (Sweden) P Nyborg | 4 | 6

Final
4 | (Russia) Yevgeny Kafelnikov (Netherlands) Menno Oosting | 4 | 4
(Sweden) **Jonas Björkman** (Sweden) **Nicklas Kulti** | **6** | **6**
