= 1996 European Community Championships =

Tennis tournament

- Date: 19 – 25 February
- Edition: 14th
- Category: Championship Series
- Draw: 32S / 16D
- Prize money: $875,000
- Surface: Carpet / indoor
- Location: Antwerp, Belgium
- Venue: Sportpaleis Antwerp

Champions

Singles
- (Germany) Michael Stich

Doubles
- (Sweden) Jonas Björkman / (Sweden) Nicklas Kulti
← 1994 ·	European Community Championships	· 1997 →

The 1996 European Community Championships was a men's tennis tournament played on indoor carpet courts at the Sportpaleis Antwerp in Antwerp in Belgium and was part of the Championship Series of the 1996 ATP Tour. The tournament ran from 19 February through 25 February 1996. Sixth-seeded Michael Stich won the singles title.

== Finals ==
=== Singles ===
(Germany) Michael Stich defeated (Croatia) Goran Ivanišević 6–3, 6–2, 7–6^{(7–5)}

- It was Stich's 1st title of the year and the 27th of his career.

=== Doubles ===
(Sweden) Jonas Björkman / (Sweden) Nicklas Kulti defeated (Russia) Yevgeny Kafelnikov / (Netherlands) Menno Oosting 6–4, 6–4

- It was Björkman's 1st title of the year and the 11th of his career. It was Kulti's 1st title of the year and the 4th of his career.
