= ATP Antwerp =

ATP Antwerp may refer to:

- ECC Antwerp (1992–1994, 1996–1998)
- European Open (2016–2024)
