= 1993 European Community Championships – Singles =

Singles
- 1993 European Community Championships

Final
- Champion: (United States) Pete Sampras
- Runner-up: (Sweden) Magnus Gustafsson
- Score: 6–1, 6–4

Details
- Draw: 32 (3WC/4Q/1LL)
- Seeds: 8

Events
Singles	Doubles
← 1992 ·	ECC Antwerp	· 1994 →

Richard Krajicek was the defending champion, but did not compete this year.

Pete Sampras won the title by defeating Magnus Gustafsson 6–1, 6–4 in the final.

== Seeds ==
1. (United States) Pete Sampras (champion)
2. (Germany) Michael Stich (quarterfinals)
3. (France) Cédric Pioline (semifinals)
4. (Germany) Boris Becker (semifinals)
5. (Croatia) Goran Ivanišević (quarterfinals)
6. (Czech Republic) Petr Korda (first round)
7. (Australia) Wally Masur (first round)
8. (United States) Ivan Lendl (first round)

== Draw ==
=== Key ===
- Q = Qualifier
- WC = Wild card
- LL = Lucky loser
- Alt = Alternate
- SE = Special exempt
- PR = Protected ranking
- ITF = ITF entry
- JE = Junior exempt
- w/o = Walkover
- r = Retired
- d = Defaulted
- SR = Special ranking

=== Finals ===
Semifinals
1	(United States) Pete Sampras	4	7	6
3	(France) Cédric Pioline	6	5	1
4/WC	(Germany) Boris Becker	6^{5}	3
(Sweden) Magnus Gustafsson	7^{7}	6

Final
1	(United States) Pete Sampras	6	6
(Sweden) Magnus Gustafsson	1	4

=== Top half ===
First round
1	(United States) P Sampras	6	6
(United States) D Wheaton	3	2
(Spain) J Sánchez	4	6	6
(United States) A Krickstein	6	4	4
(Sweden) N Kulti	7	6
(South Africa) W Ferreira	5	3
(France) G Raoux	6	6
7	(Australia) W Masur	3	2
3	(France) C Pioline	7	7
(United States) MV Washington	5	5
(Germany) MK Goellner	4	6	6
(Sweden) M Pernfors	6	1	2
WC	(Belgium) J Van Herck	6	7
Q	(United States) A O'Brien	4	5
(United States) R Reneberg	4	4
5/WC	(Croatia) G Ivanišević	6	6

Second round
1	(United States) P Sampras	6	7
(Spain) J Sánchez	4	5
(Sweden) N Kulti	2	7	6
(France) G Raoux	6	5	3
3	(France) C Pioline	6	7^{9}
(Germany) MK Goellner	3	6^{7}
WC	(Belgium) J Van Herck	3	3
5/WC	(Croatia) G Ivanišević	6	6

Quarterfinals
1	(United States) P Sampras	7^{8}	6
(Sweden) N Kulti	6^{6}	3
3	(France) C Pioline	7^{9}	6
5/WC	(Croatia) G Ivanišević	6^{7}	0

Semifinals
1	(United States) P Sampras	4	7	6
3	(France) C Pioline	6	5	1

=== Bottom half ===
First round
6	(Czech Republic) P Korda	4	6^{5}
(Sweden) M Larsson	6	7^{7}
Q	(Germany) H Dreekmann	4	5
Q	(United States) R Matuszewski	6	7
(United States) C Adams	6	6
LL	(United States) D Witt	2	2
(Australia) J Stoltenberg	6	3	5
4/WC	(Germany) B Becker	2	6	7
8	(United States) I Lendl	3	6	1
(New Zealand) B Steven	6	1	6
(Australia) M Woodforde	3	1
(Sweden) M Gustafsson	6	6
(Sweden) H Holm	7^{7}	1	6
(Netherlands) J Siemerink	6^{4}	6	3
Q	(Sweden) A Järryd	2	6	4
2	(Germany) M Stich	6	3	6

Second round
(Sweden) M Larsson	6	6
Q	(United States) R Matuszewski	3	2
(United States) C Adams	6^{7}	4
4/WC	(Germany) B Becker	7^{9}	6
(New Zealand) B Steven	6	4	2
(Sweden) M Gustafsson	2	6	6
(Sweden) H Holm	6^{1}	1
2	(Germany) M Stich	7^{7}	6

Quarterfinals
(Sweden) M Larsson	1	6^{0}
4/WC	(Germany) B Becker	6	7^{7}
(Sweden) M Gustafsson	7^{8}	7
2	(Germany) M Stich	6^{6}	5

Semifinals
4/WC	(Germany) B Becker	6^{5}	3
(Sweden) M Gustafsson	7^{7}	6
