= 1994 European Community Championships – Singles =

Singles
- 1994 European Community Championships

Final
- Champion: (United States) Pete Sampras
- Runner-up: (Sweden) Magnus Larsson
- Score: 7–6^{(7–5)}, 6–4

Details
- Draw: 32 (3WC/4Q)
- Seeds: 8

Events
Singles	Doubles
← 1993 ·	ECC Antwerp	· 1996 →

Pete Sampras successfully defended his title by defeating Magnus Larsson 7–6^{(7–5)}, 6–4 in the final.

== Seeds ==
1. (United States) Pete Sampras (champion)
2. (Germany) Michael Stich (first round)
3. (Sweden) Stefan Edberg (second round, withdrew)
4. (Netherlands) Richard Krajicek (first round)
5. (Australia) Jason Stoltenberg (first round)
6. (Australia) Patrick Rafter (quarterfinals)
7. (Sweden) Magnus Larsson (final)
8. (Peru) Jaime Yzaga (second round)

== Draw ==
=== Key ===
- Q = Qualifier
- WC = Wild card
- LL = Lucky loser
- Alt = Alternate
- SE = Special exempt
- PR = Protected ranking
- ITF = ITF entry
- JE = Junior exempt
- w/o = Walkover
- r = Retired
- d = Defaulted
- SR = Special ranking

=== Finals ===
Semifinals
1	(United States) Pete Sampras	7	6
WC	(United States) Jared Palmer	5	3
(France) Olivier Delaître	4	3
7	(Sweden) Magnus Larsson	6	6

Final
1	(United States) Pete Sampras	7^{7}	6
7	(Sweden) Magnus Larsson	6^{5}	4

=== Top half ===
First round
1	(United States) P Sampras	7^{7}	6
WC	(Belgium) J Van Herck	6^{2}	4
(United States) R Reneberg	7^{7}	6^{8}	6
(United States) D Wheaton	6^{1}	7^{10}	1
(Haiti) R Agénor	7	1	3
WC	(Zimbabwe) B Black	5	6	6
Q	(Germany) A Thoms	2	6^{1}
8	(Peru) J Yzaga	6	7^{7}
3/WC	(Sweden) S Edberg	4	6	6
(United Kingdom) J Bates	6	4	3
(France) G Forget	6^{4}	3
WC	(United States) J Palmer	7^{7}	6
(France) A Boetsch	6^{3}	7^{7}	4
(Australia) R Fromberg	7^{7}	6^{5}	6
Q	(Australia) M Tebbutt	4	3
6	(Australia) P Rafter	6	6

Second round
1	(United States) P Sampras	6	6
(United States) R Reneberg	3	3
WC	(Zimbabwe) B Black	6	5	6
8	(Peru) J Yzaga	3	7	3
3/WC	(Sweden) S Edberg
WC	(United States) J Palmer	w/o
(Australia) R Fromberg	6^{5}	6	6^{3}
6	(Australia) P Rafter	7^{7}	2	7^{7}

Quarterfinals
1	(United States) P Sampras	6	6
WC	(Zimbabwe) B Black	1	3
WC	(United States) J Palmer	6	6
6	(Australia) P Rafter	4	4

Semifinals
1	(United States) P Sampras	7	6
WC	(United States) J Palmer	5	3

=== Bottom half ===
First round
5	(Australia) J Stoltenberg	5	3
(Sweden) J Björkman	7	6
(Italy) R Furlan	7^{7}	7^{7}
Q	(Denmark) K Carlsen	6^{2}	6^{0}
(United States) A Krickstein	6	6^{7}	6
(Spain) J Sánchez	1	7^{9}	3
(France) O Delaître	7^{7}	7^{7}
4	(Netherlands) R Krajicek	6^{3}	6^{4}
7	(Sweden) M Larsson	7	6
(United States) J Stark	5	3
(France) C Pioline	7^{7}	6
(Australia) M Woodforde	6^{4}	3
(Austria) H Skoff	6^{7}	3
(Israel) A Mansdorf	7^{9}	6
Q	(Canada) S Lareau	6^{0}	6	6
2	(Germany) M Stich	7^{7}	3	3

Second round
(Sweden) J Björkman	6	7^{7}
(Italy) R Furlan	3	6^{2}
(United States) A Krickstein	4	2
(France) O Delaître	6	6
7	(Sweden) M Larsson	6	5	7^{14}
(France) C Pioline	4	7	6^{12}
(Israel) A Mansdorf	6^{6}	1
Q	(Canada) S Lareau	7^{8}	6

Quarterfinals
(Sweden) J Björkman	3	3
(France) O Delaître	6	6
7	(Sweden) M Larsson	7^{7}	6^{5}	7^{7}
Q	(Canada) S Lareau	6^{3}	7^{7}	6^{5}

Semifinals
(France) O Delaître	4	3
7	(Sweden) M Larsson	6	6
