= 1997 European Community Championships – Doubles =

Doubles
- 1997 European Community Championships
- 1996 Champions: (Sweden) Jonas Björkman (Sweden) Nicklas Kulti

Final
- Champions: (South Africa) David Adams (France) Olivier Delaître
- Runners-up: (Australia) Sandon Stolle (Czech Republic) Cyril Suk
- Score: 3–6, 6–2, 6–1

Details
- Draw: 16
- Seeds: 4

Events
Singles	Doubles
- European Community Championships

Jonas Björkman and Nicklas Kulti were the defending champions but only Kulti competed that year with Daniel Vacek.

Kulti and Vacek lost in the quarterfinals to Hendrik Jan Davids and Marc-Kevin Goellner.

David Adams and Olivier Delaître won in the final 3–6, 6–2, 6–1 against Sandon Stolle and Cyril Suk.

== Seeds ==
Champion seeds are indicated in bold text while text in italics indicates the round in which those seeds were eliminated.

1. (Sweden) Nicklas Kulti / (Czech Republic) Daniel Vacek (quarterfinals)
2. (Belgium) Libor Pimek / (South Africa) Byron Talbot (first round)
3. (Czech Republic) Martin Damm / (Russia) Andrei Olhovskiy (semifinals)
4. (South Africa) Marius Barnard / (South Africa) Piet Norval (quarterfinals)

== Draw ==
Key

- Q = Qualifier
- WC = Wild card
- LL = Lucky loser
- Alt = Alternate
- ITF = ITF entry
- PR = Protected ranking
- SR = Special ranking
- SE = Special exempt
- JE = Junior exempt
- JR = Junior Accelerator Programme entrant
- CO = College Accelerator Programme entrant
- NG = Next Gen Accelerator Program entrant
- w/o = Walkover
- r = Retired
- d = Defaulted

First round
1	(Sweden) **N Kulti** (Czech Republic) **D Vacek**	**7**	**7**
(Argentina) P Albano (Sweden) P Nyborg	5	6
(Netherlands) **H J Davids** (Germany) **M-K Goellner**	4	**6**	**6**
WC	(Croatia) S Hiršzon (Croatia) G Ivanišević	**6**	0	2
4	(South Africa) **M Barnard** (South Africa) **P Norval**	**7**	5	**6**
(France) G Forget (Netherlands) T Nijssen	5	**7**	4
(Australia) J Eagle (Australia) A Florent	2	2
(South Africa) **D Adams** (France) **O Delaître**	**6**	**6**
(Netherlands) **S Noteboom** (Netherlands) **F Wibier**	**6**	**6**
LL	(Belgium) W Neefs (Belgium) D Norman	0	4
Q	(South Africa) J-L de Jager (United States) M Keil	**6**	6	4
3	(Czech Republic) **M Damm** (Russia) **A Olhovskiy**	**7**	**6**
(Australia) A Kratzmann (Czech Republic) P Vízner	4	4
(Australia) **S Stolle** (Czech Republic) **C Suk**	**6**	**6**
WC	(Belgium) **F Dewulf** (Belgium) **J Van Herck**	**6**	6	**6**
2	(Belgium) L Pimek (South Africa) B Talbot	2	**7**	1

Quarterfinals
1	(Sweden) N Kulti (Czech Republic) D Vacek	3	4
(Netherlands) **H J Davids** (Germany) **M-K Goellner**	**6**	**6**
4	(South Africa) M Barnard (South Africa) P Norval	**6**	5	6
(South Africa) **D Adams** (France) **O Delaître**	2	**7**	**7**
(Netherlands) S Noteboom (Netherlands) F Wibier	**7**	4	5
3	(Czech Republic) **M Damm** (Russia) **A Olhovskiy**	6	**6**	**7**
(Australia) **S Stolle** (Czech Republic) **C Suk**	**6**	**6**
WC	(Belgium) F Dewulf (Belgium) J Van Herck	2	0

Semifinals
(Netherlands) H J Davids (Germany) M-K Goellner	2	4
(South Africa) **D Adams** (France) **O Delaître**	**6**	**6**
3	(Czech Republic) M Damm (Russia) A Olhovskiy
(Australia) **S Stolle** (Czech Republic) **C Suk**	**w/o**

Final
(South Africa) **David Adams** (France) **Olivier Delaître**	3	**6**	**6**
(Australia) Sandon Stolle (Czech Republic) Cyril Suk	**6**	2	1
