= 1993 European Community Championships – Doubles =

Doubles
- 1993 European Community Championships

Final
- Champions: (Canada) Grant Connell (United States) Patrick Galbraith
- Runners-up: (South Africa) Wayne Ferreira (Spain) Javier Sánchez
- Score: 6–3, 7–6

Details
- Draw: 16 (2WC/1Q)
- Seeds: 4

Events
Singles	Doubles
- ECC Antwerp

John Fitzgerald and Anders Järryd were the defending champions, but lost in the semifinals to Grant Connell and Patrick Galbraith.

Connell and Galbraith won the title by defeating Wayne Ferreira and Javier Sánchez 6–3, 7–6 in the final.

== Seeds ==
1. (Canada) Grant Connell / (United States) Patrick Galbraith (champions)
2. (Australia) Todd Woodbridge / (Australia) Mark Woodforde (first round)
3. (Australia) John Fitzgerald / (Sweden) Anders Järryd (semifinals)
4. (South Africa) Gary Muller / (South Africa) Danie Visser (semifinals)

== Draw ==
Key

- Q = Qualifier
- WC = Wild card
- LL = Lucky loser
- Alt = Alternate
- ITF = ITF entry
- PR = Protected ranking
- SR = Special ranking
- SE = Special exempt
- JE = Junior exempt
- JR = Junior Accelerator Programme entrant
- CO = College Accelerator Programme entrant
- NG = Next Gen Accelerator Program entrant
- w/o = Walkover
- r = Retired
- d = Defaulted

=== Draw ===
First round
1	(Canada) G Connell (United States) P Galbraith	6	7
(Canada) G Michibata (United States) B Pearce	2	6
(Netherlands) T Nijssen (Czech Republic) C Suk	6	6	7
(United States) K Flach (United States) R Leach	3	7	5
3	(Australia) J Fitzgerald (Sweden) A Järryd	6	6
(United States) S Cannon (United States) S Melville	2	3
(United States) S Davis (United States) R Reneberg	7	6
(Australia) D Macpherson (Australia) L Warder	6	3
WC	(Belgium) L Pimek (United States) D Wheaton	7	6	3
Q	(Germany) MK Goellner (United States) M Keil	6	7	6
(Netherlands) HJ Davids (South Africa) P Norval	4	7	5
4	(South Africa) G Muller (South Africa) D Visser	6	6	7
(United States) L Jensen (United States) M Jensen	2	7	7
(Australia) M Kratzmann (Australia) W Masur	6	5	5
WC	(South Africa) W Ferreira (Spain) J Sánchez	6	6
2	(Australia) T Woodbridge (Australia) M Woodforde	3	4

Quarterfinals
1	(Canada) G Connell (United States) P Galbraith	6	6
(Netherlands) T Nijssen (Czech Republic) C Suk	2	2
3	(Australia) J Fitzgerald (Sweden) A Järryd	6	3	6
(United States) S Davis (United States) R Reneberg	3	6	1
Q	(Germany) MK Goellner (United States) M Keil	7	6	4
4	(South Africa) G Muller (South Africa) D Visser	6	7	6
(United States) L Jensen (United States) M Jensen	5	7	5
WC	(South Africa) W Ferreira (Spain) J Sánchez	7	5	7

Semifinals
1	(Canada) G Connell (United States) P Galbraith	6	7
3	(Australia) J Fitzgerald (Sweden) A Järryd	3	6
4	(South Africa) G Muller (South Africa) D Visser	6	6
WC	(South Africa) W Ferreira (Spain) J Sánchez	7	7

Final
1	(Canada) G Connell (United States) P Galbraith	6	7
WC	(South Africa) W Ferreira (Spain) J Sánchez	3	6
