= 1997 European Community Championships – Singles =

Singles
- 1997 European Community Championships

Final
- Champion: (Switzerland) Marc Rosset
- Runner-up: (United Kingdom) Tim Henman
- Score: 6–2, 7–5, 6–4

Details
- Draw: 32
- Seeds: 8

Events
Singles	Doubles
- European Community Championships

Michael Stich was the defending champion but lost in the first round to Marc-Kevin Goellner.

Marc Rosset won in the final 6–2, 7–5, 6–4 against Tim Henman.

== Seeds ==
A champion seed is indicated in bold text while text in italics indicates the round in which that seed was eliminated.

1. n/a
2. (Chile) Marcelo Ríos (second round)
3. (Sweden) Thomas Enqvist (first round)
4. n/a
5. (Spain) Félix Mantilla (second round)
6. (United Kingdom) Tim Henman (final)
7. (Germany) Michael Stich (first round)
8. (Netherlands) Jan Siemerink (first round)

== Draw ==
Key

- Q = Qualifier
- WC = Wild card
- LL = Lucky loser
- Alt = Alternate
- ITF = ITF entry
- PR = Protected ranking
- SR = Special ranking
- SE = Special exempt
- JE = Junior exempt
- JR = Junior Accelerator Programme entrant
- CO = College Accelerator Programme entrant
- NG = Next Gen Accelerator Program entrant
- w/o = Walkover
- r = Retired
- d = Defaulted
- NB: The Final was the best of 5 sets while all other rounds were the best of 3 sets.

=== Final ===
Final
	(Switzerland) **Marc Rosset**	**6**	**7**	**6**
6	(United Kingdom) Tim Henman	2	5	4

=== Section 1 ===
First round
LL	(Belgium) **F Dewulf**	**6**	5	**6**
(France) G Forget	4	**7**	4
(United States) J Courier	0	2
(France) **C Pioline**	**6**	**6**
(Ukraine) A Medvedev	6^{4}	2
(Switzerland) **M Rosset**	**7^{7}**	**6**
Q	(Germany) **N Kiefer**	3	**6**	**7**
8	(Netherlands) J Siemerink	**6**	4	5
LL	(Netherlands) D van Scheppingen	3	2
(Czech Republic) **P Korda**	**6**	**6**
(Germany) H Dreekmann	4	2
(Spain) **J Sánchez**	**6**	**6**
Q	(Belgium) **D Norman**	**5**
(Czech Republic) B Ulihrach	2	r
(Germany) B Karbacher	2	1
5	(Spain) **F Mantilla**	**6**	**6**

Second round
LL	(Belgium) **F Dewulf**	**7^{10}**	**6**
(France) C Pioline	6^{8}	4
(Switzerland) **M Rosset**	3	**6**	**6**
Q	(Germany) N Kiefer	**6**	3	1
(Czech Republic) **P Korda**	**6**	**6**
(Spain) J Sánchez	3	3
Q	(Belgium) **D Norman**	**6**	1	**7^{8}**
5	(Spain) F Mantilla	3	**6**	6^{6}

Quarterfinals
LL	(Belgium) F Dewulf	**6**	1	4
(Switzerland) **M Rosset**	4	**6**	**6**
(Czech Republic) **P Korda**	**6**	**6**
Q	(Belgium) D Norman	3	4

Semifinals
(Switzerland) **M Rosset**	**7^{7}**	**6**
(Czech Republic) P Korda	6^{2}	3

=== Section 2 ===
First round
6	(United Kingdom) **T Henman**	**6**	4	**6**
WC	(Spain) S Bruguera	3	**6**	4
(Argentina) H Gumy	**6**	1	4
(Sweden) **M Tillström**	4	**6**	**6**
WC	(Belgium) **J van Herck**	**6**	**6**
(France) A Boetsch	2	4
(Spain) **F Clavet**	4	**7^{7}**	**6**
3	(Sweden) T Enqvist	**6**	6^{4}	3
7	(Germany) M Stich	6^{6}	4
(Germany) **M-K Goellner**	**7^{8}**	**6**
Q	(Belgium) **C van Garsse**	**7**	**6**
(Italy) R Furlan	5	3
(Czech Republic) **M Damm**	6^{5}	**6**	**6**
Q	(Germany) M Sinner	**7^{7}**	4	3
(Romania) A Voinea	1	4
2	(Chile) **M Ríos**	**6**	**6**

Second round
6	(United Kingdom) **T Henman**	**6**	**6**
(Sweden) M Tillström	2	3
WC	(Belgium) J van Herck	**6**	3	3
(Spain) **F Clavet**	3	**6**	**6**
(Germany) **M-K Goellner**	**6**	**6**
Q	(Belgium) C van Garsse	3	4
(Czech Republic) **M Damm**	4	**7**	**7^{7}**
2	(Chile) M Ríos	**6**	5	6^{3}

Quarterfinals
6	(United Kingdom) **T Henman**	**7^{7}**	**6**
(Spain) F Clavet	6^{4}	4
(Germany) **M-K Goellner**	**3**
(Czech Republic) M Damm	1	r

Semifinals
6	(United Kingdom) **T Henman**	**6**	**6**
(Germany) M-K Goellner	4	4
