= 1992 European Community Championships =

Tennis tournament

- Date: 9–15 November
- Edition: 11th
- Category: World Series
- Draw: 32S / 16D
- Prize money: $1,000,000
- Surface: Carpet / indoor
- Location: Antwerp, Belgium
- Venue: Sportpaleis Antwerp

Champions

Singles
- (Netherlands) Richard Krajicek

Doubles
- (Australia) John Fitzgerald / (Sweden) Anders Järryd
- European Community Championships

The 1992 European Community Championships was a men's tennis tournament played on indoor carpet courts at the Sportpaleis Antwerp in Antwerp in Belgium and was part of the World Series (Designated Week) of the 1992 ATP Tour. It was the 11th edition of the tournament, the first on the ATP Tour, and was held from 9 November through 15 November 1992. Sixth-seeded Richard Krajicek, who entered the main draw on a wildcard, won the singles title.

== Finals ==
=== Singles ===
(Netherlands) Richard Krajicek defeated (Australia) Mark Woodforde 6–2, 6–2

- It was Krajicek's 2nd and last singles title of the year and the 3rd of his career.

=== Doubles ===
(Australia) John Fitzgerald / (Sweden) Anders Järryd defeated (United States) Patrick McEnroe / (United States) Jared Palmer 6–2, 6–2

- It was Fitzgerald's 3rd doubles title of the year and the 27th of his career. It was Järryd's 4th doubles title of the year and the 51st of his career.
