= Champions Cup Boston =

Annual tennis tournament in Boston, Massachusetts

Champions Cup Boston is an event in the Outback Champions Series for senior tennis players. It is held each year in Boston.

== Finals results ==
Year	Champion	Runner-up	Score	Ref
2009	Pete Sampras	John McEnroe	7-6(10), 6-4	
2008	John McEnroe	Aaron Krickstein	5-7, 6-3, 10-5 (TB)	
2007	Pete Sampras	Todd Martin	6-3, 5-7, 11-9 (TB)	
