= 1997 European Community Championships =

- Date: 17–23 February
- Edition: 15th
- Category: Championship Series
- Draw: 32S / 16D
- Prize money: $875,000
- Surface: Hard / indoor
- Location: Antwerp, Belgium
- Venue: Sportpaleis Antwerp

Champions

Singles
- (Switzerland) Marc Rosset

Doubles
- (South Africa) David Adams / (France) Olivier Delaître
- European Community Championships

The 1997 European Community Championships was a men's tennis tournament played on indoor carpet courts at the Sportpaleis Antwerp in Antwerp, Belgium and was part of the Championship Series of the 1997 ATP Tour. It was the 15th edition of the tournament and was held from 17 February through 23 February 1997. Unseeded Marc Rosset won the singles title.

== Finals ==
=== Men's singles ===
(Switzerland) Marc Rosset defeated (United Kingdom) Tim Henman 6–2, 7–5, 6–4

- It was Rosset's 1st title of the year and the 12th of his career.

=== Men's doubles ===
(South Africa) David Adams / (France) Olivier Delaître defeated (Australia) Sandon Stolle / (Czech Republic) Cyril Suk 3–6, 6–2, 6–1

- It was Adams' only title of the year and the 10th of his career. It was Delaître's only title of the year and the 8th of his career.
