= Jonas Björkman =

Swedish tennis player and coach

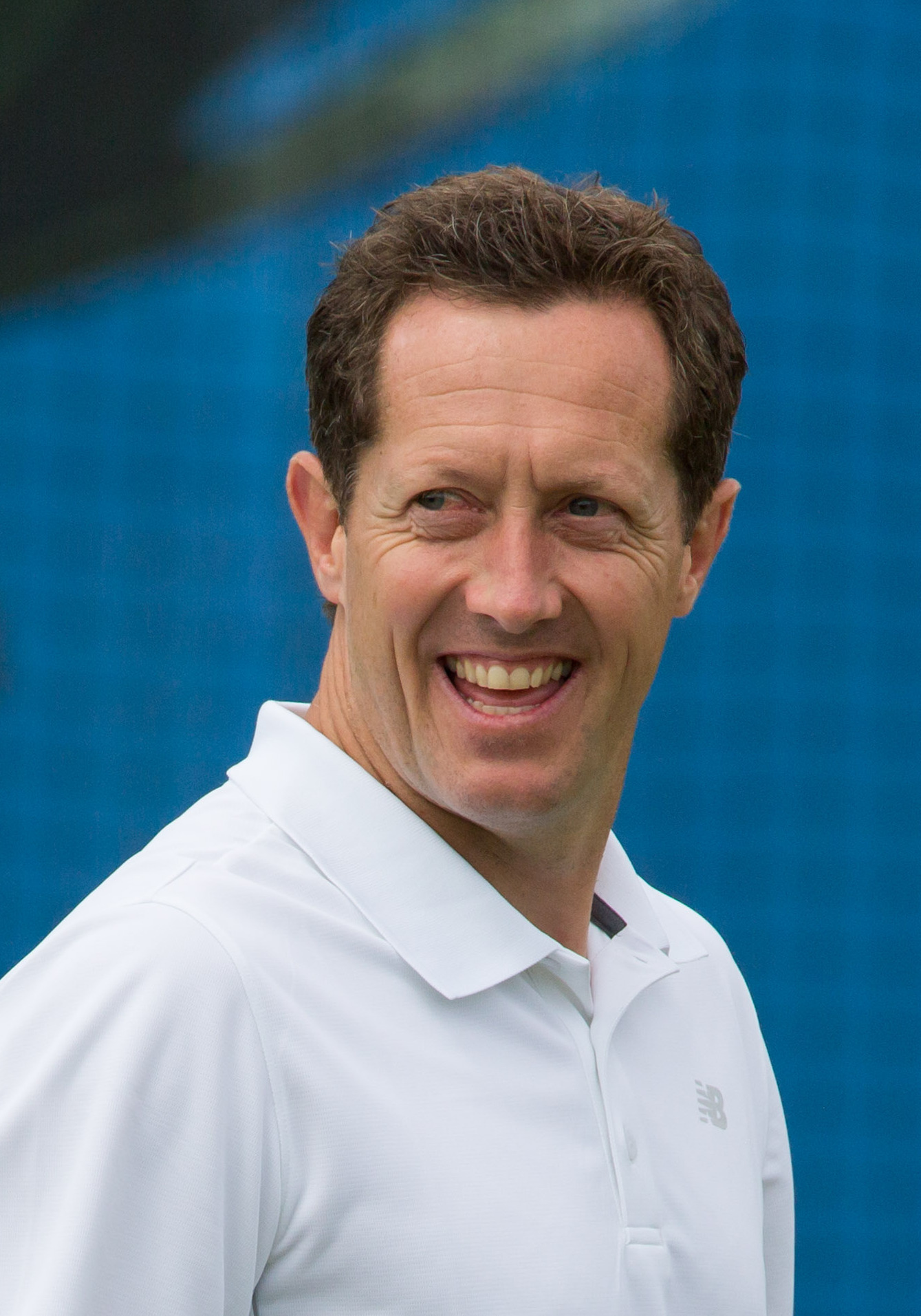
- Björkman in 2014
- Country (sports): Sweden
- Residence: Stockholm
- Born: 23 March 1972 (age 54) Alvesta, Sweden
- Height: 1.83 m (6 ft 0 in)
- Turned pro: 1991
- Retired: 2008 (singles); 2013 (doubles)
- Plays: Right-handed (two-handed backhand)
- Prize money: $14,610,671

Singles
- Career record: 414–362
- Career titles: 6
- Highest ranking: No. 4 (3 November 1997)

Grand Slam singles results
- Australian Open: QF (1998, 2002)
- French Open: 4R (1996, 2007)
- Wimbledon: SF (2006)
- US Open: SF (1997)

Other tournaments
- Tour Finals: SF (1997)
- Grand Slam Cup: QF (1997, 1998)
- Olympic Games: 1R (1996, 2004, 2008)

Doubles
- Career record: 712–307
- Career titles: 54
- Highest ranking: No. 1 (9 July 2001)

Grand Slam doubles results
- Australian Open: W (1998, 1999, 2001)
- French Open: W (2005, 2006)
- Wimbledon: W (2002, 2003, 2004)
- US Open: W (2003)

Other doubles tournaments
- Tour Finals: W (1994, 2006)

Grand Slam mixed doubles results
- Australian Open: SF (2000)
- French Open: SF (2005)
- Wimbledon: F (1999, 2007)
- US Open: SF (2008)

Team competitions
- Davis Cup: W (1994, 1997, 1998)
- Hopman Cup: F (1999)

Coaching career (2015–)
- Andy Murray (2015), Marin Čilić (2016–2017)

Coaching achievements
- Coachee singles titles total: 4
- List of notable tournaments (with champion) 2x ATP World Tour Masters 1000 (Murray)

Jonas Lars Björkman (Swedish pronunciation: [ˈjûːnas ˈbjœ̌rkman]; born 23 March 1972) is a Swedish former professional tennis player. He is a former world No. 1 in doubles, and also a former world No. 4 in singles. Björkman retired from professional tennis after competing at the 2008 Tennis Masters Cup doubles championships. As of 2019, he was ranked in the top 40 on the all-time ATP prize money list with over $14.5 million. As of July 2024 he is still in the top 50 of the all-time ATP prize money list.

Björkman has had long-term successful doubles partnerships with Jan Apell, Jacco Eltingh, Nicklas Kulti, Max Mirnyi, Pat Rafter, Kevin Ullyett, and Todd Woodbridge. He has won the career Grand Slam in men's doubles, holding a total of nine major championships.

In March 2015, he joined Andy Murray's coaching team. He has also coached the Swedish men's padel team.

== Biography ==
The son of tennis coach and mailman Lars Björkman, Jonas began playing tennis at the age of six. At 18, he won the Swedish Junior Championship and was among the top-5 Swede junior players. He married Petra on 2 December 2000 in Stockholm, and they have a son, Max (born 15 January 2003).

He plays right-handed and has a particularly good record against left-handed players. He claims it's because his father plays left-handed.

== Career ==
He turned professional in 1991. In 1993, he won three Challenger singles titles. In 1994, he won seven titles in doubles including the 1994 ATP Tour World Championships in Jakarta. In 1995, he reached his first career ATP singles final in Hong Kong. In 1997, he became the ninth ever Swedish tennis player to finish in ATP top 10 at No. 4. He advanced to his first Grand Slam semifinal at the US Open, defeating Francisco Clavet, Todd Martin, Gustavo Kuerten, Scott Draper and Petr Korda before losing to Greg Rusedski. At the 1998 Australian Open, he won his first career doubles Grand Slam title. 2000 saw him finishing in the singles top 50 for the fifth time in seven years.

In his ATP career, he won six singles titles and 54 titles in doubles, including nine Grand Slam titles in doubles.

He made his Davis Cup debut in 1994 and was a regular for Sweden throughout his career. He compiled a 21–14 record in doubles and a 14–9 record in live singles rubbers. He was a member of Sweden's Davis Cup championship teams in 1994, 1997, and 1998.

In 2002, Björkman won the Nottingham Open by defeating Wayne Arthurs in the final, however, at Wimbledon, he found himself drawn against top seed Lleyton Hewitt in the first round. Björkman was defeated in straight sets, as Hewitt went on to win the tournament.

In the 2006 Wimbledon, he unexpectedly made it into the singles semifinals at the age of 34, making him the oldest player to get there since Jimmy Connors in 1987. He had only made it into the singles quarterfinals once in 2003. He was unseeded, but defeated 14th-seeded Radek Štěpánek in a match which included saving a match point. He had previously ousted his doubles partner Max Mirnyi and another Swede, Thomas Johansson, and Lukáš Dlouhý and Daniele Bracciali to make the quarterfinals. In the semifinal he found world No. 1 and defending champion Roger Federer too good and was overpowered in straight sets, 6–2, 6–0, 6–2. When John McEnroe announced his official return to the ATP Pro Tour in 2006, he teamed up with Björkman to win the doubles title at the SAP Open in San Jose.

During Wimbledon in 2008, he announced that he would be playing in his final Wimbledon as he was planning on retiring at the end of the season. Although being knocked out in the first round of singles, Björkman and Kevin Ullyett made it to the final, being defeated by second seeds Daniel Nestor and Nenad Zimonjić, though receiving a hero's farewell to his extensive career at Wimbledon.

Björkman retired from professional tennis, after the Swede and his partner Ullyett failed to qualify for the doubles semifinal at the 2008 Tennis Masters Cup.

On 2 October 2013, he announced a comeback on tour in If Stockholm Open doubles draw, receiving a wild card in pair with fellow countryman Robert Lindstedt.

He competed as a celebrity dancer in Let's Dance 2015.

== Coaching ==
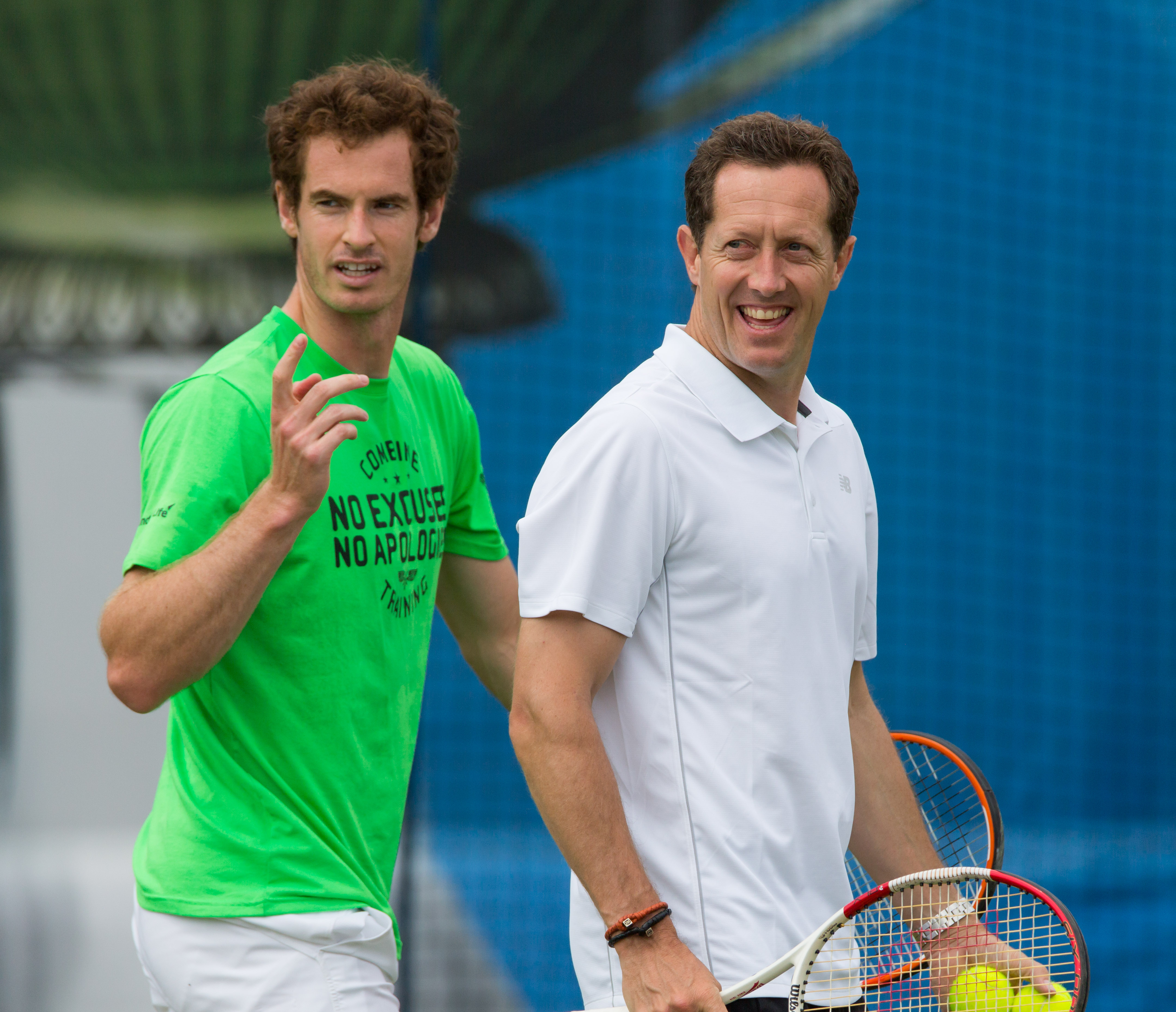
Murray with new coach Jonas Björkman during practice at the 2015 Aegon Championships

Andy Murray added Björkman to his coaching staff in March 2015, initially on a five-week trial to help out in periods when Amélie Mauresmo was unavailable as she only agreed to travel with him for 25 weeks of the tennis year when she first became Murray's coach in June 2014. However, at the end of the 2015 Australian Open, Mauresmo had informed Murray that she was pregnant and expecting in August. Murray then announced in late April 2015 that Björkman would be his main coach for all of the North American hard-court swing, while Mauresmo would be on maternity leave after 2015 Wimbledon until late in the year. Jonas Björkman joined Murray's team in April 2015, helping Murray win the BMW Open in Munich; his first clay-court title. This was followed by Murray winning his first Masters 1000 title on clay in Madrid. In June 2015, Björkman was with Andy Murray through Queen's where Murray ended up winning his fourth Queen's Club title at the Aegon Championships. and Björkman was Murray's main coach when Murray won the 2015 Canadian Open in Montreal, which was Murray's third Canadian Open title. In the middle of December 2015, Murray decided not to renew Bjorkman's contract. The Swede, who joined the world No. 2's entourage earlier in 2015, took charge of his coaching for the last four months of the season in the absence of Amélie Mauresmo but was not part of the team afterwards.

== Major finals ==
=== Grand Slam finals ===
==== Doubles: 15 (9–6) ====
Result	Year	Championship	Surface	Partner	Opponents	Score
Loss	1994	French Open	Clay	(Sweden) Jan Apell	(Zimbabwe) Byron Black (United States) Jonathan Stark	4–6, 6–7
Loss	1997	US Open	Hard	(Sweden) Nicklas Kulti	(Russia) Yevgeny Kafelnikov (Czech Republic) Daniel Vacek	6–7^{(8–10)}, 3–6
Win	1998	Australian Open	Hard	(Netherlands) Jacco Eltingh	(Australia) Todd Woodbridge (Australia) Mark Woodforde	6–2, 5–7, 2–6, 6–4, 6–3
Win	1999	Australian Open (2)	Hard	(Australia) Patrick Rafter	(India) Mahesh Bhupathi (India) Leander Paes	6–3, 4–6, 6–4, 6–7^{(10–12)}, 6–4
Win	2001	Australian Open (3)	Hard	(Australia) Todd Woodbridge	(Zimbabwe) Byron Black (Germany) David Prinosil	6–1, 5–7, 6–4, 6–4
Win	2002	Wimbledon	Grass	(Australia) Todd Woodbridge	(The Bahamas) Mark Knowles (Canada) Daniel Nestor	6–1, 6–2, 6–7^{(7–9)}, 7–5
Win	2003	Wimbledon (2)	Grass	(Australia) Todd Woodbridge	(India) Mahesh Bhupathi (Belarus) Max Mirnyi	3–6, 6–3, 7–6^{(7–4)}, 6–3
Win	2003	US Open	Hard	(Australia) Todd Woodbridge	(United States) Bob Bryan (United States) Mike Bryan	5–7, 6–0, 7–5
Win	2004	Wimbledon (3)	Grass	(Australia) Todd Woodbridge	(Austria) Julian Knowle (Serbia and Montenegro) Nenad Zimonjić	6–1, 6–4, 4–6, 6–4
Win	2005	French Open	Clay	(Belarus) Max Mirnyi	(United States) Bob Bryan (United States) Mike Bryan	2–6, 6–1, 6–4
Loss	2005	US Open (2)	Hard	(Belarus) Max Mirnyi	(United States) Bob Bryan (United States) Mike Bryan	1–6, 4–6
Win	2006	French Open (2)	Clay	(Belarus) Max Mirnyi	(United States) Bob Bryan (United States) Mike Bryan	6–7^{(5–7)}, 6–4, 7–5
Loss	2006	US Open (3)	Hard	(Belarus) Max Mirnyi	(Czech Republic) Martin Damm (India) Leander Paes	7–6^{(7–5)}, 4–6, 3–6
Loss	2007	Australian Open	Hard	(Belarus) Max Mirnyi	(United States) Bob Bryan (United States) Mike Bryan	5–7, 5–7
Loss	2008	Wimbledon	Grass	(Zimbabwe) Kevin Ullyett	(Canada) Daniel Nestor (Serbia) Nenad Zimonjić	6–7^{(12–14)}, 7–6^{(7–3)}, 3–6, 3–6

==== Mixed doubles: 2 (2 runner-ups) ====
Result	Year	Championship	Surface	Partner	Opponents	Score
Loss	1999	Wimbledon	Grass	(Russia) Anna Kournikova	(India) Leander Paes (United States) Lisa Raymond	4–6, 6–3, 3–6
Loss	2007	Wimbledon (2)	Grass	(Australia) Alicia Molik	(United Kingdom) Jamie Murray (Serbia) Jelena Janković	4–6, 6–3, 1–6

=== Masters Series finals ===
==== Singles: 1 (1 runner-up) ====
Result	Year	Championship	Surface	Opponent	Score
Loss	1997	Paris Masters	Carpet (i)	(United States) Pete Sampras	3–6, 6–4, 3–6, 1–6

== Career finals ==
=== Singles: 11 (6–5) ===
Legend
Grand Slam (0–0)
Tennis Masters Cup (0–0)
ATP Masters Series (0–1)
International Series Gold (1–0)
ATP Tour (5–4)

Result	W–L	Date	Tournament	Surface	Opponent	Score
Loss	0–1	Apr 1995	Hong Kong	Hard	(United States) Michael Chang	3–6, 1–6
Win	1–1	Jan 1997	Auckland, New Zealand	Hard	(Denmark) Kenneth Carlsen	7–6^{(7–0)}, 6–0
Loss	1–2	May 1997	Coral Springs, US	Clay	(Australia) Jason Stoltenberg	0–6, 6–2, 5–7
Win	2–2	Aug 1997	Indianapolis, US	Hard	(Spain) Carlos Moyà	6–3, 7–6^{(7–3)}
Loss	2–3	Oct 1997	Paris, France	Carpet (i)	(United States) Pete Sampras	3–6, 6–4, 3–6, 1–6
Win	3–3	Nov 1997	Stockholm, Sweden	Hard (i)	(Netherlands) Jan Siemerink	3–6, 7–6^{(7–5)}, 6–2, 6–4
Win	4–3	Jun 1998	Nottingham, UK	Grass	(Zimbabwe) Byron Black	6–3, 6–2
Win	5–3	Jun 2002	Nottingham, UK	Grass	(Australia) Wayne Arthurs	6–2, 6–7^{(5–7)}, 6–2
Loss	5–4	Feb 2003	Marseille, France	Hard (i)	(Switzerland) Roger Federer	2–6, 6–7^{(6–8)}
Win	6–4	Sep 2005	Ho Chi Minh City, Vietnam	Carpet (i)	(Czech Republic) Radek Štěpánek	6–3, 7–6^{(7–4)}
Loss	6–5	Jun 2006	Nottingham, UK	Grass	(France) Richard Gasquet	4–6, 3–6

=== Doubles: 97 (54–43) ===
Legend Grand Slam (9–6) Tennis Masters Cup (2–0) ATP Masters Series (15–10) International Series Gold (2–6) ATP Tour (26–21)	Titles by surface Hard (27–28) Clay (15–5) Grass (6–5) Carpet (6–5)

Result	W–L	Date	Tournament	Surface	Partner	Opponents	Score
Loss	0–1	Aug 1992	Prague, Czech Republic	Clay	(Australia) Jon Ireland	(Czechoslovakia) Karel Nováček (Czechoslovakia) Branislav Stankovič	5–7, 1–6
Loss	0–2	Oct 1993	Kuala Lumpur, Malaysia	Hard	(Sweden) Lars-Anders Wahlgren	(Netherlands) Jacco Eltingh (Netherlands) Paul Haarhuis	5–7, 6–4, 6–7
Loss	0–3	Nov 1993	Moscow, Russia	Carpet (i)	(Sweden) Jan Apell	(Netherlands) Jacco Eltingh (Netherlands) Paul Haarhuis	1–6, ret.
Win	1–3	Jan 1994	Jakarta, Indonesia	Hard	(Australia) Neil Borwick	(Mexico) Jorge Lozano (United States) Jim Pugh	6–4, 6–1
Win	2–3	Jan 1994	Rotterdam, Netherlands (1)	Carpet (i)	(United Kingdom) Jeremy Bates	(Netherlands) Jacco Eltingh (Netherlands) Paul Haarhuis	6–4, 6–1
Loss	2–4	Apr 1994	Hong Kong	Hard	(Australia) Patrick Rafter	(United States) Jim Grabb (New Zealand) Brett Steven	w/o
Loss	2–5	Jun 1994	French Open, Paris	Clay	(Sweden) Jan Apell	(Zimbabwe) Byron Black (United States) Jonathan Stark	4–6, 6–7
Win	3–5	Jun 1994	Queen's Club, England	Grass	(Sweden) Jan Apell	(Australia) Todd Woodbridge (Australia) Mark Woodforde	3–6, 7–6, 6–4
Win	4–5	Jul 1994	Båstad, Sweden (1)	Clay	(Sweden) Jan Apell	(Sweden) Nicklas Kulti (Sweden) Mikael Tillström	6–2, 6–3
Loss	4–6	Jul 1994	Washington, D.C., US	Hard	(Switzerland) Jakob Hlasek	(Canada) Grant Connell (United States) Patrick Galbraith	4–6, 6–4, 3–6
Win	5–6	Aug 1994	Schenectady, US	Hard	(Sweden) Jan Apell	(Netherlands) Jacco Eltingh (Netherlands) Paul Haarhuis	6–4, 7–6
Loss	5–7	Oct 1994	Tel Aviv, Israel	Hard (i)	(Sweden) Jan Apell	(South Africa) Lan Bale (South Africa) John-Laffnie de Jager	7–6, 2–6, 6–7
Loss	5–8	Oct 1994	Stockholm, Sweden	Carpet (i)	(Sweden) Jan Apell	(Australia) Mark Woodforde (Australia) Todd Woodbridge	3–6, 4–6
Win	6–8	Nov 1994	Antwerp, Belgium (1)	Carpet (i)	(Sweden) Jan Apell	(Netherlands) Hendrik Jan Davids (Canada) Sébastien Lareau	4–6, 6–1, 6–2
Win	7–8	Nov 1994	Tennis Masters Cup, Jakarta (1)	Hard (i)	(Sweden) Jan Apell	(Australia) Todd Woodbridge (Australia) Mark Woodforde	6–4, 4–6, 4–6, 7–6^{(7–5)}, 7–6^{(8–6)}
Loss	7–9	May 1995	Rome Masters, Italy	Clay	(Sweden) Jan Apell	(Czech Republic) Cyril Suk (Czech Republic) Daniel Vacek	3–6, 4–6
Loss	7–10	Jun 1995	Queen's Club, England	Grass	(Sweden) Jan Apell	(United States) Todd Martin (United States) Pete Sampras	6–7, 4–6
Win	8–10	Jul 1995	Båstad, Sweden (2)	Clay	(Sweden) Jan Apell	(Australia) Jon Ireland (Australia) Andrew Kratzmann	6–3, 6–0
Win	9–10	Oct 1995	Toulouse, France	Hard (i)	(South Africa) John-Laffnie de Jager	(United States) Dave Randall (United States) Greg Van Emburgh	7–6, 7–6
Win	10–10	Oct 1995	Ostrava, Czech Republic	Carpet (i)	(Argentina) Javier Frana	(France) Guy Forget (Australia) Patrick Rafter	6–7, 6–4, 7–6
Loss	10–11	Jan 1996	Adelaide, Australia	Hard	(United States) Tommy Ho	(Australia) Mark Woodforde (Australia) Todd Woodbridge	5–7, 6–7
Loss	10–12	Jan 1996	Auckland, New Zealand	Hard	(New Zealand) Brett Steven	(South Africa) Marcos Ondruska (United States) Jack Waite	w/o
Win	11–12	Feb 1996	Antwerp, Belgium (2)	Carpet (i)	(Sweden) Nicklas Kulti	(Russia) Yevgeny Kafelnikov (Netherlands) Menno Oosting	6–4, 6–4
Win	12–12	Apr 1996	New Delhi, India	Hard	(Sweden) Nicklas Kulti	(Zimbabwe) Byron Black (Australia) Sandon Stolle	4–6, 6–4, 6–4
Loss	12–13	Apr 1996	Monte Carlo, Monaco	Clay	(Sweden) Nicklas Kulti	(South Africa) Ellis Ferreira (Netherlands) Jan Siemerink	6–3, 3–6, 2–6
Loss	12–14	Aug 1996	Los Angeles, US	Hard	(Sweden) Nicklas Kulti	(South Africa) Marius Barnard (South Africa) Piet Norval	5–7, 2–6
Loss	12–15	Aug 1996	New Haven, US	Hard	(Sweden) Nicklas Kulti	(Zimbabwe) Byron Black (Canada) Grant Connell	4–6, 4–6
Loss	12–16	Mar 1997	Scottsdale, US	Hard	(United States) Rick Leach	(Argentina) Luis Lobo (Spain) Javier Sánchez	3–6, 3–6
Win	13–16	May 1997	Atlanta, US	Clay	(Sweden) Nicklas Kulti	(United States) Scott Davis (United States) Kelly Jones	6–4, 6–4
Loss	13–17	Aug 1997	Indianapolis, US	Hard	(Sweden) Nicklas Kulti	(Sweden) Mikael Tillström (Australia) Michael Tebbutt	3–6, 2–6
Loss	13–18	Sep 1997	US Open, New York	Hard	(Sweden) Nicklas Kulti	(Russia) Yevgeny Kafelnikov (Czech Republic) Daniel Vacek	6–7^{(8–10)}, 3–6
Win	14–18	Feb 1998	Australian Open, Melbourne (1)	Hard	(Netherlands) Jacco Eltingh	(Australia) Todd Woodbridge (Australia) Mark Woodforde	6–2, 5–7, 2–6, 6–4, 6–3
Win	15–18	Mar 1998	Indian Wells, US	Hard	(Australia) Patrick Rafter	(United States) Todd Martin (United States) Richey Reneberg	6–4, 7–6
Win	16–18	Feb 1999	Australian Open, Melbourne (2)	Hard	(Australia) Patrick Rafter	(India) Mahesh Bhupathi (India) Leander Paes	6–3, 4–6, 6–4, 6–7^{(10–12)}, 6–4
Win	17–18	Jun 1999	Halle, Germany (1)	Grass	(Australia) Patrick Rafter	(Netherlands) Paul Haarhuis (United States) Jared Palmer	6–3, 7–5
Win	18–18	Aug 1999	Montreal, Canada	Hard	(Australia) Patrick Rafter	(Zimbabwe) Byron Black (South Africa) Wayne Ferreira	7–6^{(7–5)}, 6–4
Win	19–18	Aug 1999	Cincinnati, US (1)	Hard	(Zimbabwe) Byron Black	(Australia) Todd Woodbridge (Australia) Mark Woodforde	6–3, 7–6^{(8–6)}
Win	20–18	Nov 1999	Stuttgart Indoor, Germany	Hard (i)	(Zimbabwe) Byron Black	(South Africa) David Adams (South Africa) John-Laffnie de Jager	6–7^{(6–8)}, 7–6^{(7–2)}, 6–0
Loss	20–19	Mar 2000	Copenhagen, Denmark	Hard (i)	(Canada) Sébastien Lareau	(Czech Republic) Martin Damm (Germany) David Prinosil	1–6, 7–5, 5–7
Loss	20–20	Aug 2000	Indianapolis, US	Hard	(Belarus) Max Mirnyi	(Australia) Lleyton Hewitt (Australia) Sandon Stolle	2–6, 6–3, 3–6
Win	21–20	Oct 2000	Moscow, Russia	Carpet (i)	(Germany) David Prinosil	(Czech Republic) Jiří Novák (Czech Republic) David Rikl	6–2, 6–3
Loss	21–21	Jan 2001	Sydney, Australia	Hard	(Australia) Todd Woodbridge	(Canada) Daniel Nestor (Australia) Sandon Stolle	6–2, 6–7^{(4–7)}, 6–7^{(5–7)}
Win	22–21	Jan 2001	Australian Open, Melbourne (3)	Hard	(Australia) Todd Woodbridge	(Zimbabwe) Byron Black (Germany) David Prinosil	6–1, 5–7, 6–4, 6–4
Win	23–21	Feb 2001	Rotterdam, Netherlands (2)	Hard (i)	(Switzerland) Roger Federer	(Czech Republic) Petr Pála (Czech Republic) Pavel Vízner	6–3, 6–0
Loss	23–22	Mar 2001	Indian Wells, US	Hard	(Australia) Todd Woodbridge	(South Africa) Wayne Ferreira (Russia) Yevgeny Kafelnikov	2–6, 5–7
Loss	23–23	Apr 2001	Miami, US	Hard	(Australia) Todd Woodbridge	(Czech Republic) Jiří Novák (Czech Republic) David Rikl	5–7, 6–7^{(3–7)}
Win	24–23	Apr 2001	Monte Carlo, Monaco (1)	Clay	(Australia) Todd Woodbridge	(Australia) Joshua Eagle (Australia) Andrew Florent	3–6, 6–4, 6–2
Win	25–23	May 2001	Hamburg, Germany (1)	Clay	(Australia) Todd Woodbridge	(Canada) Daniel Nestor (Australia) Sandon Stolle	7–6^{(7–2)}, 3–6, 6–3
Loss	25–24	Oct 2001	Stockholm, Sweden	Hard (i)	(Australia) Todd Woodbridge	(United States) Donald Johnson (United States) Jared Palmer	3–6, 6–4, 3–6
Win	26–24	Jan 2002	Auckland, New Zealand	Hard	(Australia) Todd Woodbridge	(Argentina) Martín García (Czech Republic) Cyril Suk	7–6^{(7–5)}, 7–6^{(9–7)}
Win	27–24	Apr 2002	Monte Carlo, Monaco (2)	Clay	(Australia) Todd Woodbridge	(Netherlands) Paul Haarhuis (Russia) Yevgeny Kafelnikov	6–3, 3–6, [10–7]
Loss	27–25	May 2002	Hamburg, Germany	Clay	(Australia) Todd Woodbridge	(India) Mahesh Bhupathi (United States) Jan-Michael Gambill	2–6, 4–6
Loss	27–26	Jun 2002	Halle, Germany	Grass	(Australia) Todd Woodbridge	(Germany) David Prinosil (Czech Republic) David Rikl	6–4, 6–7^{(5–7)}, 5–7
Win	28–26	Jul 2002	Wimbledon, London (1)	Grass	(Australia) Todd Woodbridge	(The Bahamas) Mark Knowles (Canada) Daniel Nestor	6–1, 6–2, 6–7^{(7–9)}, 7–5
Win	29–26	Jul 2002	Båstad, Sweden (3)	Clay	(Australia) Todd Woodbridge	(Australia) Paul Hanley (Australia) Michael Hill	7–6^{(8–6)}, 6–4
Win	30–26	Jun 2003	Halle, Germany (2)	Grass	(Australia) Todd Woodbridge	(Czech Republic) Martin Damm (Czech Republic) Cyril Suk	6–3, 6–4
Win	31–26	Jul 2003	Wimbledon, London (2)	Grass	(Australia) Todd Woodbridge	(India) Mahesh Bhupathi (Belarus) Max Mirnyi	3–6, 6–3, 7–6^{(7–4)}, 6–3
Loss	31–27	Aug 2003	Montreal, Canada	Hard	(Australia) Todd Woodbridge	(India) Mahesh Bhupathi (Belarus) Max Mirnyi	3–6, 6–7^{(4–7)}
Win	32–27	Sep 2003	US Open, New York	Hard	(Australia) Todd Woodbridge	(United States) Bob Bryan (United States) Mike Bryan	5–7, 6–0, 7–5
Win	33–27	Oct 2003	Stockholm, Sweden (1)	Hard (i)	(Australia) Todd Woodbridge	(Australia) Wayne Arthurs (Australia) Paul Hanley	6–3, 6–4
Win	34–27	Jan 2004	Sydney, Australia	Hard	(Australia) Todd Woodbridge	(United States) Bob Bryan (United States) Mike Bryan	7–6^{(7–3)}, 7–5
Loss	34–28	Mar 2004	Dubai, UAE	Hard	(India) Leander Paes	(India) Mahesh Bhupathi (France) Fabrice Santoro	2–6, 6–4, 4–6
Loss	34–29	Apr 2004	Miami, US	Hard	(Australia) Todd Woodbridge	(Zimbabwe) Wayne Black (Zimbabwe) Kevin Ullyett	2–6, 6–7^{(12–14)}
Win	35–29	Jul 2004	Wimbledon, London (3)	Grass	(Australia) Todd Woodbridge	(Austria) Julian Knowle (Serbia and Montenegro) Nenad Zimonjić	6–1, 6–4, 4–6, 6–4
Win	36–29	Jul 2004	Båstad, Sweden (4)	Clay	(India) Mahesh Bhupathi	(Sweden) Simon Aspelin (Australia) Todd Perry	4–6, 7–6^{(7–2)}, 7–6^{(8–6)}
Loss	36–30	Aug 2004	Toronto, Canada	Hard	(Belarus) Max Mirnyi	(India) Mahesh Bhupathi (India) Leander Paes	4–6, 2–6
Loss	36–31	Aug 2004	Cincinnati, US	Hard	(Australia) Todd Woodbridge	(The Bahamas) Mark Knowles (Canada) Daniel Nestor	2–6, 6–3, 3–6
Loss	36–32	Oct 2004	Lyon, France	Carpet (i)	(Czech Republic) Radek Štěpánek	(Israel) Jonathan Erlich (Israel) Andy Ram	6–7^{(2–7)}, 2–6
Loss	36–33	Oct 2004	Moscow, Russia	Carpet (i)	(India) Mahesh Bhupathi	(Russia) Igor Andreev (Russia) Nikolay Davydenko	6–3, 3–6, 4–6
Win	37–33	Nov 2004	Paris, France (1)	Carpet (i)	(Australia) Todd Woodbridge	(Zimbabwe) Wayne Black (Zimbabwe) Kevin Ullyett	6–3, 6–4
Loss	37–34	Jan 2005	Chennai, India	Hard	(India) Mahesh Bhupathi	(Taiwan) Lu Yen-hsun (Germany) Rainer Schüttler	5–7, 6–4, 6–7^{(4–7)}
Loss	37–35	Feb 2005	Dubai, UAE	Hard	(France) Fabrice Santoro	(Czech Republic) Martin Damm (Czech Republic) Radek Štěpánek	2–6, 4–6
Win	38–35	Apr 2005	Miami, US (1)	Hard	(Belarus) Max Mirnyi	(Zimbabwe) Wayne Black (Zimbabwe) Kevin Ullyett	6–1, 6–2
Win	39–35	May 2005	Hamburg, Germany (2)	Clay	(Belarus) Max Mirnyi	(France) Michaël Llodra (France) Fabrice Santoro	4–6, 7–6^{(7–2)}, 7–6^{(7–3)}
Win	40–35	Jun 2005	French Open, Paris (1)	Clay	(Belarus) Max Mirnyi	(United States) Bob Bryan (United States) Mike Bryan	2–6, 6–1, 6–4
Loss	40–36	Jun 2005	Queen's Club, England	Grass	(Belarus) Max Mirnyi	(United States) Bob Bryan (United States) Mike Bryan	6–7^{(11–13)}, 6–7^{(4–7)}
Win	41–36	Jul 2005	Båstad, Sweden (5)	Clay	(Sweden) Joachim Johansson	(Argentina) José Acasuso (Argentina) Sebastián Prieto	6–2, 6–3
Win	42–36	Aug 2005	Cincinnati, US (2)	Hard	(Belarus) Max Mirnyi	(Zimbabwe) Wayne Black (Zimbabwe) Kevin Ullyett	7–6^{(7–3)}, 6–2
Loss	42–37	Sep 2005	US Open, New York	Hard	(Belarus) Max Mirnyi	(United States) Bob Bryan (United States) Mike Bryan	1–6, 4–6
Loss	42–38	Oct 2005	St. Petersburg, Russia	Carpet (i)	(Belarus) Max Mirnyi	(Austria) Julian Knowle (Austria) Jürgen Melzer	6–4, 5–7, 5–7
Win	43–38	Jan 2006	Doha, Qatar	Hard	(Belarus) Max Mirnyi	(Belgium) Christophe Rochus (Belgium) Olivier Rochus	2–6, 6–3, [10–8]
Win	44–38	Feb 2006	San Jose, US	Hard (i)	(United States) John McEnroe	(United States) Paul Goldstein (United States) Jim Thomas	7–6^{(7–2)}, 4–6, [10–7]
Win	45–38	Apr 2006	Miami, US (2)	Hard	(Belarus) Max Mirnyi	(United States) Bob Bryan (United States) Mike Bryan	6–4, 6–4
Win	46–38	Apr 2006	Monte Carlo, Monaco (3)	Clay	(Belarus) Max Mirnyi	(France) Fabrice Santoro (Serbia) Nenad Zimonjić	6–2, 7–6^{(7–2)}
Win	47–38	Jun 2006	French Open, Paris (2)	Clay	(Belarus) Max Mirnyi	(United States) Bob Bryan (United States) Mike Bryan	6–7^{(5–7)}, 6–4, 7–5
Loss	47–39	Jun 2006	Queen's Club, England	Grass	(Belarus) Max Mirnyi	(Australia) Paul Hanley (Zimbabwe) Kevin Ullyett	4–6, 6–3, [8–10]
Win	48–39	Jul 2006	Båstad, Sweden (6)	Clay	(Sweden) Thomas Johansson	(Germany) Christopher Kas (Austria) Oliver Marach	6–3, 4–6, [10–4]
Win	49–39	Aug 2006	Cincinnati, US (3)	Hard	(Belarus) Max Mirnyi	(United States) Bob Bryan (United States) Mike Bryan	3–6, 6–3, [10–7]
Loss	49–40	Sep 2006	US Open, New York	Hard	(Belarus) Max Mirnyi	(Czech Republic) Martin Damm (India) Leander Paes	7–6^{(7–5)}, 4–6, 3–6
Win	50–40	Nov 2006	Tennis Masters Cup, Shanghai (2)	Hard (i)	(Belarus) Max Mirnyi	(The Bahamas) Mark Knowles (Canada) Daniel Nestor	6–2, 6–4
Loss	50–41	Jan 2007	Australian Open, Melbourne	Hard	(Belarus) Max Mirnyi	(United States) Bob Bryan (United States) Mike Bryan	5–7, 5–7
Win	51–41	Oct 2007	Stockholm, Sweden (2)	Hard (i)	(Belarus) Max Mirnyi	(France) Arnaud Clément (France) Michaël Llodra	6–4, 6–4
Loss	51–42	Jul 2008	Wimbledon, London	Grass	(Zimbabwe) Kevin Ullyett	(Canada) Daniel Nestor (Serbia) Nenad Zimonjić	6–7^{(12–14)}, 7–6^{(7–3)}, 3–6, 3–6
Win	52–42	Jul 2008	Båstad, Sweden (7)	Clay	(Sweden) Robin Söderling	(Sweden) Johan Brunström (Netherlands Antilles) Jean-Julien Rojer	6–2, 6–2
Win	53–42	Oct 2008	Stockholm, Sweden (3)	Hard (i)	(Zimbabwe) Kevin Ullyett	(Sweden) Johan Brunström (Sweden) Michael Ryderstedt	6–1, 6–3
Win	54–42	Nov 2008	Paris, France (2)	Hard (i)	(Zimbabwe) Kevin Ullyett	(South Africa) Jeff Coetzee (South Africa) Wesley Moodie	6–2, 6–2
Loss	54–43	Oct 2013	Stockholm, Sweden	Hard (i)	(Sweden) Robert Lindstedt	(Pakistan) Aisam-ul-Haq Qureshi (Netherlands) Jean-Julien Rojer	2–6, 2–6

== Performance timelines ==
Key
W	F	SF	QF	#R	RR	Q#	DNQ	A	NH

(W) winner; (F) finalist; (SF) semifinalist; (QF) quarterfinalist; (#R) rounds 4, 3, 2, 1; (RR) round-robin stage; (Q#) qualification round; (DNQ) did not qualify; (A) absent; (NH) not held; (SR) strike rate (events won / competed); (W–L) win–loss record.

=== Singles ===
Tournament	1991	1992	1993	1994	1995	1996	1997	1998	1999	2000	2001	2002	2003	2004	2005	2006	2007	2008	SR
Grand Slam tournaments
Australian Open	A	A	A	2R	3R	4R	4R	QF	1R	3R	1R	QF	A	1R	1R	1R	2R	A	0 / 13
French Open	A	A	Q1	3R	1R	4R	2R	1R	1R	1R	1R	1R	2R	2R	1R	1R	4R	1R	0 / 15
Wimbledon	A	A	Q1	4R	2R	1R	1R	3R	2R	4R	3R	1R	QF	3R	3R	SF	4R	1R	0 / 15
US Open	A	A	2R	QF	3R	3R	SF	QF	3R	2R	2R	1R	4R	1R	2R	2R	2R	A	0 / 15
Year-end championships
Tennis Masters Cup	Did not qualify						SF	Did not qualify											0 / 1
Grand Slam Cup	Did not qualify			1R	DNQ		QF	QF	DNQ	Not Held									0 / 3
ATP Masters Series
Indian Wells	A	A	A	A	2R	2R	SF	1R	1R	1R	2R	1R	A	3R	3R	2R	2R	2R	0 / 13
Miami	A	A	A	3R	SF	2R	QF	2R	3R	1R	4R	2R	2R	3R	2R	1R	1R	1R	0 / 15
Monte Carlo	A	A	A	A	2R	1R	1R	1R	1R	1R	2R	1R	1R	2R	Q1	Q2	1R	Q1	0 / 11
Rome	A	A	A	A	QF	A	A	1R	1R	LQ	1R	1R	A	1R	Q2	Q1	1R	Q2	0 / 7
Hamburg	A	A	A	A	A	A	A	A	A	A	1R	1R	Q1	1R	A	A	1R	A	0 / 4
Canada	A	A	A	1R	A	1R	3R	QF	1R	1R	1R	A	Q2	1R	2R	1R	1R	2R	0 / 12
Cincinnati	A	A	A	A	2R	2R	1R	1R	2R	3R	1R	1R	A	3R	A	1R	1R	1R	0 / 12
Madrid	A	1R	A	1R	1R	A	SF	SF	Q1	A	A	Q1	2R	1R	A	1R	A	A	0 / 8
Paris	A	A	A	A	1R	A	F	1R	A	A	A	Q1	QF	1R	A	1R	Q1	A	0 / 6
Year-end ranking	700	333	96	50	30	69	4	24	75	44	60	48	30	70	62	54	59	173	

=== Doubles ===
Tournament	1991	1992	1993	1994	1995	1996	1997	1998	1999	2000	2001	2002	2003	2004	2005	2006	2007	2008	SR	W–L
Grand Slam tournaments
Australian Open	A	A	A	SF	1R	3R	3R	W	W	2R	W	2R	A	SF	SF	QF	F	A	3 / 13	44–10
French Open	A	A	1R	F	2R	QF	2R	SF	3R	2R	QF	QF	2R	3R	W	W	QF	QF	2 / 16	44–14
Wimbledon	A	A	1R	3R	3R	QF	QF	SF	QF	3R	3R	W	W	W	SF	QF	1R	F	3 / 16	51–13
US Open	A	A	QF	1R	1R	1R	F	QF	SF	1R	3R	SF	W	3R	F	F	3R	2R	1 / 16	42–15
Win–loss	0–0	0–0	3–3	11–4	3–4	8–4	11–4	17–3	15–3	4–4	13–3	14–3	13–1	14–3	19–3	17–3	10–4	9–3	9 / 61	181–52
Year-end championships
Tennis Masters Cup	A	A	A	W	A	RR	A	A	A	A	A	NH	RR	SF	RR	W	RR	RR	2 / 8	16–13
ATP Masters Series
Indian Wells	A	A	A	A	QF	2R	QF	W	2R	1R	F	SF	SF	1R	SF	SF	SF	QF	1 / 14	28–13
Miami	A	A	A	QF	1R	2R	2R	2R	2R	QF	F	1R	QF	F	W	W	QF	2R	2 / 15	30–13
Monte Carlo	A	A	A	A	2R	F	SF	1R	QF	1R	W	W	2R	QF	2R	W	QF	SF	3 / 14	26–11
Rome	A	A	A	A	F	A	A	QF	QF	QF	1R	A	A	SF	SF	SF	2R	SF	0 / 10	18–10
Hamburg	A	A	A	A	A	A	A	A	A	A	W	F	QF	SF	W	QF	QF	2R	2 / 8	17–6
Canada	A	A	A	A	A	SF	2R	SF	W	SF	2R	A	F	F	SF	QF	QF	QF	1 / 12	25–11
Cincinnati	A	A	A	A	2R	QF	QF	1R	W	QF	SF	1R	QF	F	W	W	2R	2R	3 / 14	26–11
Madrid	A	A	A	F	2R	A	2R	2R	W	SF	A	SF	QF	1R	A	SF	SF	SF	1 / 12	21–11
Paris	A	A	A	A	2R	A	1R	2R	2R	2R	A	SF	SF	W	1R	SF	QF	W	2 / 12	18–10
Win–loss	0–0	0–0	0–0	5–2	9–7	10–5	10–7	11–7	17–5	13–8	21–5	15–6	12–8	18–8	20–5	24–6	11–9	13–8	15 / 111	209–96
Year-end ranking	408	199	56	9	26	12	17	8	3	26	1	6	6	3	3	4	15	9		

== Top 10 wins ==
Season	1991	1992	1993	1994	1995	1996	1997	1998	1999	2000	2001	2002	2003	2004	2005	2006	2007	2008	Total
Wins	0	0	0	2	0	0	8	2	2	2	1	1	0	2	2	0	0	0	22

#	Player	Rank	Event	Surface	Rd	Score
1994
1.	(Spain) Sergi Bruguera	3	Schenectady, United States	Hard	2R	2–6, 6–4, 6–2
2.	(Sweden) Stefan Edberg	5	US Open, New York	Hard	3R	6–4, 6–4, 6–0
1997
3.	(Chile) Marcelo Ríos	9	Miami, United States	Hard	3R	6–3, 3–6, 6–1
4.	(United States) Pete Sampras	1	Queen's Club, London	Grass	QF	3–6, 6–3, 6–4
5.	(Spain) Carlos Moyà	9	Indianapolis, United States	Hard	F	6–3, 7–6^{(7–3)}
6.	(Brazil) Gustavo Kuerten	9	US Open, New York	Hard	3R	6–3, 6–1, 7–5
7.	(Australia) Pat Rafter	3	Stockholm, Sweden	Hard (i)	SF	7–6^{(7–3)}, 7–6^{(7–3)}
8.	(Spain) Sergi Bruguera	8	ATP Tour World Championships, Hanover	Hard (i)	RR	6–3, 6–1
9.	(United States) Michael Chang	2	ATP Tour World Championships, Hanover	Hard (i)	RR	6–4, 7–5
10.	(United States) Michael Chang	3	Davis Cup, Gothenburg	Carpet (i)	RR	7–5, 1–6, 6–3, 6–3
1998
11.	(Spain) Àlex Corretja	7	Davis Cup, Stockholm	Carpet (i)	RR	6–3, 7–5, 6–7^{(5–7)}, 6–3
12.	(Spain) Carlos Moyá	5	Davis Cup, Stockholm	Carpet (i)	RR	6–3, 7–5
1999
13.	(Netherlands) Richard Krajicek	4	Tokyo, Japan	Hard	QF	3–6, 7–5, 6–1
14.	(Australia) Mark Philippoussis	10	World Team Cup, Düsseldorf	Clay	F	6–4, 7–6^{(7–3)}
2000
15.	(Ecuador) Nicolás Lapentti	9	Rotterdam, Netherlands	Hard (i)	1R	7–6^{(7–5)}, 6–2
16.	(Spain) Àlex Corretja	7	Cincinnati, United States	Hard	1R	6–4, 6–4
2001
17.	(France) Sébastien Grosjean	9	Lyon, France	Carpet (i)	2R	7–6^{(7–2)}, 1–6, 6–4
2002
18.	(United Kingdom) Tim Henman	8	Australian Open, Melbourne	Hard	4R	6–2, 7–6^{(8–6)}, 6–4
2004
19.	(United States) Andy Roddick	1	Doha, Qatar	Hard	2R	6–3, 6–4
20.	(Australia) Mark Philippoussis	9	Davis Cup, Adelaide	Hard	RR	7–5, 6–2, 6–2
2005
21.	(Russia) Nikolay Davydenko	7	Wimbledon, London	Grass	2R	6–7^{(4–7)}, 1–2 ret.
22.	(Argentina) Mariano Puerta	10	Ho Chi Minh City, Vietnam	Hard	SF	6–1, 6–0
