= ECC Antwerp =

Defunct tennis tournament
- Event name: European Champions' Championship (1982–1985); The European Community Championship (1986–1998)
- Tour: Invitational/Exhibition (1982–1991); World Series (1992–1994); Championship Series (1996–1998)
- Founded: 1982
- Abolished: 1998
- Editions: 16
- Location: Antwerp, Belgium
- Venue: Sportpaleis
- Surface: Carpet (indoor) (1982–1996); Hard (indoor) (1997–1998)

The European Community Championship was a men's professional tennis tournament held from 1982 until 1998 in Antwerp, Belgium. The tournament was held as a special invitational/exhibition event run outside the Grand Prix series and did not distribute any ATP ranking points until 1992, when the tournament became part of the ATP Tour. While an exhibition tournament, invitations were extended to players who won a tournament title in Europe during that year. The surface of the tournament was indoor carpet.

The inaugural event was held in December 1982, with a $700,000 purse on offer for 24 players. At that time, the high level (Super Series) European Grand Prix events like the Italian Open or indoor tournament in Wembley, London offered only $300,000 and $200,000 respectively.

It was called the European Champions' Championship and from 1986 was renamed the European Community Championship (ECC). Its nickname was the "Gold Racquet" tournament because if a player won the tournament thrice within a 5-year span, he would also receive a special trophy, a life-size, 13.2-pound gold racquet studded with 1,420 diamonds valued at $1,000,000, created by the artist Varozza. This inspired the Proximus Diamond Games, a WTA Tour event held in Antwerp since 2002, to have a similar trophy system.

In 1985, Ivan Lendl won his third title within 4 years and received the $200,000 winners prize together with the Gold Racquet. In 1991, Boris Becker spoiled Lendl's quest for a $1,250,000 million prize ($250,000 prize money plus the $1,000,000 racquet) at the ECC in Antwerp by beating him in the semifinals. Had Lendl won, he would have kept the gold-and-diamond racquet trophy valued at about $1,000,000, adding to his from 1985. He was in the running for a second after victories in 1987 and 1989, but wound up with only $100,000 that year.

== Past finals ==
=== Singles ===
| Year | Date Final | Prize money | Champion | Runner-up | Score |
Special / Invitational event
| 1982 | Dec 5 | $700,000 | (Czechoslovakia) Ivan Lendl | (United States) John McEnroe | 3–6, 7–6^{(7–2)}, 6–3, 6–3 |
| 1983 | Nov 20 | $750,000 | (United States) John McEnroe | (United States) Gene Mayer | 6–4, 6–3, 6–4 |
| 1984 | Nov 18 | $800,000 | (Czechoslovakia) Ivan Lendl | (Sweden) Anders Järryd | 6–1, 6–2, 6–2 |
| 1985 | Nov 3 | $850,000 | (Czechoslovakia) Ivan Lendl | (United States) John McEnroe | 1–6, 7–6^{(7–5)}, 6–2, 6–2 |
| 1986 | Nov 10 | $940,000 | (United States) John McEnroe | (Czechoslovakia) Miloslav Mečíř | 6–3, 1–6, 7–6^{(7–5)}, 5–7, 6–2 |
| 1987 | Nov 1 | $940,000 | (Czechoslovakia) Ivan Lendl | (Czechoslovakia) Miloslav Mečíř | 5–7, 6–1, 6–4, 6–3 |
| 1988 | Nov 6 | $940,000 | (United States) John McEnroe | (Soviet Union) Andrei Chesnokov | 6–1, 7–5, 6–2 |
| 1989 | Oct 29 | $1,000,000 | (Czechoslovakia) Ivan Lendl | (Czechoslovakia) Miloslav Mečíř | 6–2, 6–2, 1–6, 6–4 |
| 1990 | Oct 21 | $1,100,000 | (Socialist Federal Republic of Yugoslavia) Goran Ivanišević | (France) Henri Leconte | 6–2, 7–6^{(8–6)}, 4–6, 4–6, 6–1 |
| 1991 | Dec 8 | $1,250,000 | (United States) Aaron Krickstein | (Germany) Boris Becker | walkover |
ATP Tour
| 1992 | Nov 15 | $1,000,000 | (Netherlands) Richard Krajicek | (Australia) Mark Woodforde | 6–2, 6–2 |
| 1993 | Nov 14 | $1,100,000 | (United States) Pete Sampras | (Sweden) Magnus Gustafsson | 6–1, 6–4 |
| 1994 | Nov 13 | $1,100,000 | (United States) Pete Sampras | (Sweden) Magnus Larsson | 7–6^{(7–5)}, 6–4 |
| 1995 | Not held | | | | |
| 1996 | Feb 19 | $1,100,000 | (Germany) Michael Stich | (Croatia) Goran Ivanišević | 6–3, 6–2, 7–6^{(7–5)} |
| 1997 | Feb 23 | $1,000,000 | (Switzerland) Marc Rosset | (United Kingdom) Tim Henman | 6–2, 7–5, 6–4 |
| 1998 | Feb 23 | $1,000,000 | (United Kingdom) Greg Rusedski | (Switzerland) Marc Rosset | 7–6^{(7–3)}, 3–6, 6–1, 6–4 |

=== Doubles ===
| Year | Winners | Runners-up | Score |
|---|---|---|---|
| 1992 | (United States) John Fitzgerald (Sweden) Anders Järryd | (United States) Jared Palmer (United States) Patrick McEnroe | 6–2, 6–2 |
| 1993 | (Canada) Grant Connell (United States) Patrick Galbraith | (South Africa) Wayne Ferreira (Spain) Javier Sánchez | 6–3, 7–6 |
| 1994 | (Sweden) Jan Apell (Sweden) Jonas Björkman | (Netherlands) Hendrik Jan Davids (Canada) Sébastien Lareau | 4–6, 6–1, 6–2 |
| 1995 | Not held | | |
| 1996 | (Sweden) Jonas Björkman (Sweden) Nicklas Kulti | (Russia) Yevgeny Kafelnikov (Netherlands) Menno Oosting | 6–4, 6–4 |
| 1997 | (South Africa) David Adams (France) Olivier Delaître | (Australia) Sandon Stolle (Czech Republic) Cyril Suk | 3–6, 6–2, 6–1 |
| 1998 | (South Africa) Wayne Ferreira (Russia) Yevgeny Kafelnikov | (Spain) Tomás Carbonell (Spain) Francisco Roig | 7–5, 3–6, 6–2 |

== See also ==
- European Open
