= 1998 Kroger St. Jude International =

- Date: February 16–22
- Edition: 28th
- Category: International Series Gold
- Draw: 48S / 24D
- Surface: Hard / indoor
- Location: Memphis, United States
- Venue: Racquet Club of Memphis

Champions

Singles
- (Australia) Mark Philippoussis

Doubles
- (Australia) Todd Woodbridge / (Australia) Mark Woodforde
← 1997 ·	U.S. National Indoor Championships	· 1999 →

The 1998 Kroger St. Jude International was a men's tennis tournament played on indoor hard courts at the Racquet Club of Memphis in Memphis, United States, that was part of the International Series Gold of the 1998 ATP Tour. It was the 28th edition of the tournament and was held from 16 February through 22 February 1998. Fourth-seeded Mark Philippoussis won the singles title.

== Finals ==
=== Singles ===
- (Australia) Mark Philippoussis defeated (United States) Michael Chang, 6–3, 6–2.

=== Doubles ===
- (Australia) Todd Woodbridge / (Australia) Mark Woodforde defeated (South Africa) Ellis Ferreira / (Mexico) David Roditi, 6–3, 6–4.
