= 1999 Waldbaum's Hamlet Cup – Doubles =

Doubles
- 1999 Waldbaum's Hamlet Cup

Final
- Champions: (France) Olivier Delaître (France) Fabrice Santoro
- Runners-up: (United States) Jan-Michael Gambill (United States) Scott Humphries
- Score: 7–5, 6–4

Details
- Draw: 16 (3WC/1Q)
- Seeds: 4

Events
Singles	Doubles
← 1998 ·	Connecticut Open	· 2000 →

The 1999 Waldbaum's Hamlet Cup was a men's tennis tournament played on Hard courts in Long Island, United that was part of the International Series of the 1998 ATP Tour. It was the nineteenth edition of the tournament and was held from 23–29 August 1999.

Julián Alonso and Javier Sánchez were the defending champions, but none competed this year.

Olivier Delaître and Fabrice Santoro won the title by defeating Jan-Michael Gambill and Scott Humphries 7–5, 6–4 in the final.

== Seeds ==
Champion seeds are indicated in bold text while text in italics indicates the round in which those seeds were eliminated.

1. (France) **Olivier Delaître** / (France) **Fabrice Santoro (champions)**
2. (India) Mahesh Bhupathi / (South Africa) Wayne Ferreira (semifinals)
3. (Czech Republic) Jiří Novák / (Czech Republic) David Rikl (semifinals)
4. (Czech Republic) Martin Damm / (Czech Republic) Daniel Vacek (first round)

== Draw ==
=== Key ===
- Q = Qualifier
- WC = Wild card
- LL = Lucky loser
- Alt = Alternate
- SE = Special exempt
- PR = Protected ranking
- ITF = ITF entry
- JE = Junior exempt
- w/o = Walkover
- r = Retired
- d = Defaulted
- SR = Special ranking

=== Finals ===
First round
1	(France) **O Delaître** **(France) F Santoro**	2	**6**	**7**
(Brazil) J Oncins (Argentina) D Orsanic	**6**	3	5
(Italy) **M Bertolini** **(Italy) C Brandi**	**7**	6	**6**
(North Macedonia) A Kitinov (United States) J Waite	6	**7**	2
3	(Czech Republic) **J Novák** **(Czech Republic) D Rikl**	**6**	**6**
WC	(United States) L Jensen (United States) M Jensen	2	2
WC	(United States) **T Meringoff** **(United States) A Rueb**	**7**	**6**
(South Africa) C Haggard (Sweden) P Nyborg	6	3
(Argentina) **D del Río** **(Argentina) M Puerta**	**6**	**7**
Q	(Sweden) M Larsson (Sweden) M Norman	4	5
WC	(United States) **J-M Gambill** **(United States) S Humphries**	4	**6**	**6**
4	(Czechoslovakia) M Damm (Czech Republic) D Vacek	**6**	3	4
(Federal Republic of Yugoslavia) **N Djordjevic** **(New Zealand) J Greenhalgh**	2	**6**	**7**
(Czech Republic) P Pála (Czech Republic) P Vízner	**6**	3	6
2	(India) **M Bhupathi** **(South Africa) W Ferreira**	**6**	6	**6**
(Australia) G Silcock (United States) E Taino	3	**7**	2

Quarterfinals
1	(France) **O Delaître** **(France) F Santoro**	**7**	**6**
(Italy) M Bertolini (Italy) C Brandi	5	4
3	(Czech Republic) **J Novák** **(Czech Republic) D Rikl**	**6**	**7**
WC	(United States) T Meringoff (United States) A Rueb	3	6
(Argentina) D del Río (Argentina) M Puerta	**7**	6	6
WC	(United States) **J-M Gambill** **(United States) S Humphries**	6	**7**	**7**
(Federal Republic of Yugoslavia) N Djordjevic (New Zealand) J Greenhalgh	2	4
2	(India) **M Bhupathi** **(South Africa) W Ferreira**	**6**	**6**

Semifinals
1	(France) **O Delaître** **(France) F Santoro**	**7**	6	**6**
3	(Czech Republic) J Novák (Czech Republic) D Rikl	6	**7**	4
WC	(United States) **J-M Gambill** **(United States) S Humphries**	**6**	3	**6**
2	(India) M Bhupathi (South Africa) W Ferreira	1	**6**	3

Final
1	(France) **O Delaître** **(France) F Santoro**	**7**	**6**
WC	(United States) J-M Gambill (United States) S Humphries	5	4

== Qualifying ==
=== Qualifying seeds ===
1. (Australia) Andrew Painter / (South Africa) Byron Talbot (qualifying competition)
2. **(Sweden) Magnus Larsson / (Sweden) Magnus Norman (qualified)**

=== Qualifiers ===
1. **(Sweden) Magnus Larsson / (Sweden) Magnus Norman**

=== Qualifying draw ===
First round
1	**(Australia) Andrew Painter** **(United States) Byron Talbot**	**7**	**6**
WC	(United States) Ian Arons (United States) John Schmidt	6	0
(Canada) Jocelyn Robichaud (United States) Greg Van Emburgh	4	4
2	**(Sweden) Magnus Larsson** **(Sweden) Magnus Norman**	**6**	**6**

Qualifying competition
1	(Australia) Andrew Painter (United States) Byron Talbot	4	3
2	**(Sweden) Magnus Larsson** **(Sweden) Magnus Norman**	**6**	**6**
