= 1996 Genovese Hamlet Cup =

- Date: August 19–25
- Edition: 16th
- Category: World Series
- Draw: 32S / 16D
- Prize money: $225,000
- Surface: Hard / outdoor
- Location: Jericho, New York, US

Champions

Singles
- (Ukraine) Andriy Medvedev

Doubles
- (United States) Luke Jensen / (United States) Murphy Jensen
| ← 1995 · | Genovese Hamlet Cup | · 1997 → |

The 1996 Genovese Hamlet Cup was a men's tennis tournament played on outdoor hard courts at the Hamlet Golf and Country Club in Jericho, New York in the United States and was part of the World Series of the 1996 ATP Tour. It was the 16th edition of the tournament and ran from August 19 through August 25, 1996. Fifth-seeded Andriy Medvedev won the singles title.

== Finals ==
=== Singles ===
(Ukraine) Andriy Medvedev defeated (Czech Republic) Martin Damm 7–5, 6–3

- It was Medvedev's only title of the year and the 10th of his career.

=== Doubles ===
(United States) Luke Jensen / (United States) Murphy Jensen defeated (Germany) Hendrik Dreekmann / (Russia) Alexander Volkov 6–3, 7–6

- It was Luke Jensen's only title of the year and the 9th of his career. It was Murphy Jensen's only title of the year and the 3rd of his career.
