= 1998 Waldbaum's Hamlet Cup =

- Date: August 24–30
- Edition: 18th
- Category: International Series
- Surface: Hard / outdoor
- Location: Long Island, United States

Champions

Singles
- (Australia) Patrick Rafter

Doubles
- (Spain) Julián Alonso / (Spain) Javier Sánchez
← 1997 ·	Waldbaum's Hamlet Cup	· 1999 →

The 1998 Waldbaum's Hamlet Cup was a men's tennis tournament played on Hard courts in Long Island, United States that was part of the International Series of the 1998 ATP Tour. It was the eighteenth edition of the tournament and was held from 24 to 30 August 1998.

== Finals ==
=== Singles ===
(Australia) Patrick Rafter defeated (Spain) Felix Mantilla, 7–6^{(7–3)}, 6–2.

=== Doubles ===
(Spain) Julián Alonso / (Spain) Javier Sánchez defeated (United States) Brandon Coupe / (United States) Dave Randall, 6–4, 6–4.
