= 1998 Kroger St. Jude International – Singles =

Singles
- 1998 Kroger St. Jude International

Final
- Champion: (Australia) Mark Philippoussis
- Runner-up: (United States) Michael Chang
- Score: 6–3, 6–2

Details
- Draw: 48
- Seeds: 16

Events
Singles	Doubles
← 1997 ·	U.S. National Indoor Championships	· 1999 →

The 1998 Kroger St. Jude International was a men's tennis tournament played on indoor Hard courts in Memphis, United States, that was part of the International Series Gold of the 1998 ATP Tour. It was the 28th edition of the tournament and was held 16–22 February 1998.

== Seeds ==
Champion seeds are indicated in bold text while text in italics indicates the round in which those seeds were eliminated.

1. (Chile) Marcelo Ríos (semifinals)
2. (United States) Michael Chang (final)
3. (Brazil) Gustavo Kuerten (semifinals)
4. (Australia) **Mark Philippoussis (champion)**
5. (Sweden) Thomas Enqvist (quarterfinals)
6. (Australia) Todd Woodbridge (second round)
7. (United States) Jim Courier (second round)
8. (South Africa) Grant Stafford (third round)
9. (Australia) Richard Fromberg (quarterfinals)
10. (Germany) Tommy Haas (second round)
11. (Australia) Jason Stoltenberg (third round)
12. (Australia) Mark Woodforde (quarterfinals)
13. (Netherlands) Sjeng Schalken (third round)
14. (Zimbabwe) Byron Black (second round)
15. (Italy) Andrea Gaudenzi (third round)
16. (United States) Vince Spadea (second round)

== Draw ==
=== Key ===
- Q = Qualifier
- WC = Wild card
- LL = Lucky loser
- Alt = Alternate
- SE = Special exempt
- PR = Protected ranking
- ITF = ITF entry
- JE = Junior exempt
- w/o = Walkover
- r = Retired
- d = Defaulted
- SR = Special ranking

=== Finals ===
Semifinals
4	**(Australia) Mark Philippoussis**	**6**	**7**
1	(Chile) Marcelo Ríos	4	6
2	**(United States) Michael Chang**	**7**	**7**
3	(Brazil) Gustavo Kuerten	6	6

Final
4	**(Australia) Mark Philippoussis**	**6**	**6**
2	(United States) Michael Chang	3	2

=== Top half ===
==== Section 1 ====
First round
**(United States) S Campbell**	**7**	**6**
(Australia) G Doyle	6	0
**(United States) V Spadea**	**6**	**6**
(United States) A O'Brien	3	4
**(South Africa) G Stafford**	**6**	**6**
(Spain) A Martín	3	0
**(United States) MV Washington**	**7**	**6**
(Armenia) S Sargsian	6	4

Second round
(United States) S Campbell	2	4
1	**(Chile) M Ríos**	**6**	**6**
**(United States) V Spadea**	**7**	**6**
16	(Spain) J Sánchez	6	4
10	(Germany) T Haas	1	3
**(South Africa) G Stafford**	**6**	**6**
(United States) MV Washington	**6**	3	3
8	**(Spain) J Alonso**	4	**6**	**6**

Third round
1	**(Chile) M Ríos**	**6**	**6**
(United States) V Spadea	2	3
**(South Africa) G Stafford**	**6**	**7**
8	(Spain) J Alonso	1	5

Quarterfinals
1	**(Chile) M Ríos**	**6**	**6**
(South Africa) G Stafford	2	3

==== Section 2 ====
First round
**(Zimbabwe) W Black**	5	**6**	**7**
(Spain) E Benfele Álvarez	**7**	3	5
**(Sweden) T Nydahl**	**6**	**7**
(Ecuador) N Lapentti	3	6
**(Spain) JA Viloca**	4	**7**	**6**
(Israel) E Ran	**6**	6	4
**(Netherlands) P Haarhuis**	6	**6**	**6**
(United States) L Jensen	**7**	4	4

Second round
(Zimbabwe) W Black	1	2
4	**(Australia) M Philippoussis**	**6**	**6**
(Sweden) T Nydahl	**6**	3	4
13	**(Netherlands) S Schalken**	4	**6**	**6**
(Spain) JA Viloca	6	4
11	**(Australia) J Stoltenberg**	**7**	**6**
(Netherlands) P Haarhuis	2	3
5	**(Sweden) T Enqvist**	**6**	**6**

Third round
4	**(Australia) M Philippoussis**	**6**	**6**
13	(Netherlands) S Schalken	4	4
11	(Australia) J Stoltenberg	3	1
5	**(Sweden) T Enqvist**	**6**	**6**

Quarterfinals
4	**(Australia) M Philippoussis**	3	**6**	**7**
5	(Sweden) T Enqvist	**6**	2	6

=== Bottom half ===
==== Section 3 ====
First round
**(United States) T Martin**	**7**	**7**
(Brazil) F Meligeni	6	5
**(Spain) J Burillo**	6	**6**	**6**
(United States) J Stark	**7**	3	2
**(United States) J-M Gambill**	**6**	6	**6**
(Australia) S Stolle	3	**7**	4
**(United States) G Weiner**	2	**7**	**6**
(Germany) C Vinck	**6**	5	3

Second round
6	(Australia) T Woodbridge	2	4
**(United States) T Martin**	**6**	**6**
(Spain) J Burillo	3	4
12	**(Australia) M Woodforde**	**6**	**6**
14	(Zimbabwe) B Black	**7**	5	6
**(United States) J-M Gambill**	5	**7**	**7**
(United States) G Weiner	6	3
3	**(Brazil) G Kuerten**	**7**	**6**

Third round
(United States) T Martin	5	3
12	**(Australia) M Woodforde**	**7**	**6**
(United States) J-M Gambill	4	6
3	**(Brazil) G Kuerten**	**6**	**7**

Quarterfinals
12	(Australia) M Woodforde	**6**	4	4
3	**(Brazil) G Kuerten**	4	**6**	**6**

==== Section 4 ====
First round
**(United States) B MacPhie**	**6**	**7**
(United States) T. J. Middleton	3	5
**(United States) R Reneberg**	**6**	**6**
(Brazil) J Oncins	2	4
**(Paraguay) R Delgado**	3	**7**	**6**
(Italy) D Sanguinetti	**6**	5	4
**(Canada) D Nestor**	**6**	4	**6**
(Germany) M Craca	4	**6**	3

Second round
7	(United States) J Courier	2	3
**(United States) B MacPhie**	**6**	**6**
(United States) R Reneberg	**7**	2	3
9	**(Australia) R Fromberg**	5	**6**	**6**
(Paraguay) R Delgado	**6**	2	6
15	**(Italy) A Gaudenzi**	3	**6**	**7**
(Canada) D Nestor	4	4
2	**(United States) M Chang**	**6**	**6**

Third round
(United States) B MacPhie	**6**	3	4
9	**(Australia) R Fromberg**	4	**6**	**6**
15	(Italy) A Gaudenzi	3	3
2	**(United States) M Chang**	**6**	**6**

Quarterfinals
9	(Australia) R Fromberg	1	4
2	**(United States) M Chang**	**6**	**6**
