= 1998 Waldbaum's Hamlet Cup – Singles =

Singles
- 1998 Waldbaum's Hamlet Cup
- 1997 Champion: (Spain) Carlos Moyá

Final
- Champion: (Australia) Patrick Rafter
- Runner-up: (Spain) Felix Mantilla
- Score: 7–6^{(7–3)}, 6–2

Details
- Draw: 32
- Seeds: 8

Events
Singles	Doubles
← 1997 ·	Waldbaum's Hamlet Cup	· 1999 →

The 1998 Waldbaum's Hamlet Cup was a men's tennis tournament played on Hard courts in Long Island, United States that was part of the International Series of the 1998 ATP Tour. It was the eighteenth edition of the tournament and was held from 24 to 30 August 1998.

== Seeds ==
Champion seeds are indicated in bold text while text in italics indicates the round in which those seeds were eliminated.

1. (Chile) Marcelo Ríos (first round)
2. (Australia) **Patrick Rafter (champion)**
3. (Spain) Carlos Moyá (second round)
4. (United Kingdom) Greg Rusedski (semifinals)
5. Unknown (withdrew)
6. (Spain) Alberto Berasategui (first round)
7. (Croatia) Goran Ivanišević (first round)
8. (Spain) Felix Mantilla (final)
9. (Netherlands) Jan Siemerink (second round)

== Draw ==
=== Key ===
- Q = Qualifier
- WC = Wild card
- LL = Lucky loser
- Alt = Alternate
- SE = Special exempt
- PR = Protected ranking
- ITF = ITF entry
- JE = Junior exempt
- w/o = Walkover
- r = Retired
- d = Defaulted
- SR = Special ranking

=== Finals ===
Semifinals
8	**(Spain) Felix Mantilla**	**6**	5	**6**
(Russia) Marat Safin	3	**7**	4
4	(United Kingdom) Greg Rusedski	4	5
2	**(Australia) Patrick Rafter**	**6**	**7**

Final
8	(Spain) Felix Mantilla	6^{3}	2
2	**(Australia) Patrick Rafter**	**7**	**6**

=== Top half ===
First round
**(Brazil) G Kuerten**	**6**	**7**
1	(Chile) M Ríos	3	6^{4}
**(Spain) F Clavet**	**6**	**6**
(Israel) L Mor	2	1
**(Czech Republic) B Ulihrach**	**6**	**7**
(Czech Republic) C Doseděl	4	6^{5}
8	**(Spain) F Mantilla**	**6**	**6**
(Spain) S Bruguera	4	4
3	**(Spain) C Moyá**	**7**	**6**
(New Zealand) B Steven	5	3
**(Germany) D Prinosil**	0	**6**	**6**
(Slovakia) D Hrbatý	**6**	3	1
**(Belgium) F Dewulf**	**6**	**7**
(Australia) M Woodforde	4	6^{6}
**(Russia) M Safin**	**6**	**6**
6	(Spain) A Berasategui	3	2

Second round
**(Brazil) G Kuerten**	2	**6**	**7**
(Spain) F Clavet	**6**	3	6^{8}
(Czech Republic) B Ulihrach	6^{4}	3
8	**(Spain) F Mantilla**	**7**	**6**
3	(Spain) C Moyá	2	2
**(Germany) D Prinosil**	**6**	**6**
(Belgium) F Dewulf	6^{6}	1
**(Russia) M Safin**	**7**	**6**

Quarterfinals
(Brazil) G Kuerten	4	**6**	**6**
8	**(Spain) F Mantilla**	**6**	2	4
(Germany) D Prinosil	1	6^{2}
**(Russia) M Safin**	**6**	**7**

Semifinals
8	**(Spain) F Mantilla**	**6**	5	**6**
(Russia) M Safin	3	**7**	4

=== Bottom half ===
First round
9	**(Netherlands) J Siemerink**	4	**6**	**6**
(Spain) J Alonso	**6**	1	4
**(Czech Republic) D Vacek**	**6**	**6**
(Switzerland) M Rosset	1	4
**(Brazil) F Meligeni**	6^{2}	**6**	**6**
(France) G Raoux	**7**	4	3
4	**(United Kingdom) G Rusedski**	**6**	**6**
(Sweden) M Norman	3	4
**(Morocco) H Arazi**	5	**6**	**7**
7	(Croatia) G Ivanišević	**7**	3	6^{2}
**(France) N Escudé**	**6**	**6**
(Sweden) T Johansson	1	4
**(Czech Republic) M Damm**	3	**6**	**6**
(Spain) J Burillo	**6**	2	3
2	**(Australia) P Rafter**	**6**	4	**6**
(Spain) J Sánchez	2	**6**	4

Second round
9	(Netherlands) J Siemerink	1	**6**	3
**(Czech Republic) D Vacek**	**6**	4	**6**
(Brazil) F Meligeni	2	6^{6}
4	**(United Kingdom) G Rusedski**	**6**	**7**
(Morocco) H Arazi	3	**6**	3
**(France) N Escudé**	**6**	3	**6**
(Czech Republic) M Damm	4	3
2	**(Australia) P Rafter**	**6**	**6**

Quarterfinals
(Czech Republic) D Vacek	2	3
4	**(United Kingdom) G Rusedski**	**6**	**6**
(France) N Escudé	3	2
2	**(Australia) P Rafter**	**6**	**6**

Semifinals
4	(United Kingdom) G Rusedski	4	5
2	**(Australia) P Rafter**	**6**	**7**
