= 1996 Genovese Hamlet Cup – Doubles =

Doubles
- 1996 Genovese Hamlet Cup
- 1995 Champions: (Czech Republic) Cyril Suk (Czech Republic) Daniel Vacek

Final
- Champions: (United States) Luke Jensen (United States) Murphy Jensen
- Runners-up: (Germany) Hendrik Dreekmann (Russia) Alexander Volkov
- Score: 6–3, 7–6

Events
Singles	Doubles
← 1995 ·	Genovese Hamlet Cup	· 1997 →

Cyril Suk and Daniel Vacek were the defending champions but did not compete that year.

Luke Jensen and Murphy Jensen won in the final 6–3, 7–6 against Hendrik Dreekmann and Alexander Volkov.

== Seeds ==
Champion seeds are indicated in bold text while text in italics indicates the round in which those seeds were eliminated.

1. (United States) Jared Palmer / (United States) Jonathan Stark (semifinals)
2. (Czech Republic) Martin Damm / (Venezuela) Nicolás Pereira (quarterfinals)
3. (United States) Vince Spadea / (United States) Jeff Tarango (first round)
4. (Netherlands) Stephen Noteboom / (Netherlands) Fernon Wibier (first round)

== Draw ==
=== Key ===
- Q = Qualifier
- WC = Wild card
- LL = Lucky loser
- Alt = Alternate
- ITF = ITF entry
- PR = Protected ranking
- SR = Special ranking
- SE = Special exempt
- JE = Junior exempt
- JR = Junior Accelerator Programme entrant
- CO = College Accelerator Programme entrant
- NG = Next Gen Accelerator Program entrant
- w/o = Walkover
- r = Retired
- d = Defaulted

First round
1	(United States) **J Palmer** (United States) **J Stark**	**7**	3	**6**
(United States) M Joyce (United Kingdom) G Rusedski	5	**6**	2
WC	(Sweden) T Johansson (Sweden) M Larsson	3	2
(Ecuador) **N Lapentti** (Italy) **S Pescosolido**	**6**	**6**
3	(United States) V Spadea (United States) J Tarango	2	5
(United States) **L Jensen** (United States) **M Jensen**	**6**	**7**
WC	(Slovakia) J Krošlák (Slovakia) K Kučera	4	**7**	5
(United States) **K Thorne** (United States) **J Waite**	**6**	6	**7**
(Sweden) O Kristiansson (Sweden) M Renström	6	2
Q	(United States) **C Mamiit** (United States) **E Taino**	**7**	**6**
WC	(Germany) **H Dreekmann** (Russia) **A Volkov**	**7**	1	**6**
4	(Netherlands) S Noteboom (Netherlands) F Wibier	5	**6**	2
(United States) B Hansen-Dent (United States) T.J. Middleton	**7**	6	4
(United States) **C Clark** (South Africa) **K Ullyett**	6	**7**	**6**
(North Macedonia) A Kitinov (Australia) G Wilson	2	4
2	(Czech Republic) **M Damm** (Venezuela) **N Pereira**	**6**	**6**

Quarterfinals
1	(United States) **J Palmer** (United States) **J Stark**	**6**	**6**
(Ecuador) N Lapentti (Italy) S Pescosolido	4	4
(United States) **L Jensen** (United States) **M Jensen**	**7**	**6**
(United States) K Thorne (United States) J Waite	6	4
Q	(United States) C Mamiit (United States) E Taino	4	4
WC	(Germany) **H Dreekmann** (Russia) **A Volkov**	**6**	**6**
(United States) **C Clark** (South Africa) **K Ullyett**	**6**	**6**
2	(Czech Republic) M Damm (Venezuela) N Pereira	3	4

Semifinals
1	(United States) J Palmer (United States) J Stark	3	4
(United States) **L Jensen** (United States) **M Jensen**	**6**	**6**
WC	(Germany) **H Dreekmann** (Russia) **A Volkov**	**7**	**6**
(United States) C Clark (South Africa) K Ullyett	6	3

Final
(United States) **Luke Jensen** (United States) **Murphy Jensen**	**6**	**7**
WC	(Germany) Hendrik Dreekmann (Russia) Alexander Volkov	3	6
