= 1997 Waldbaum's Hamlet Cup – Singles =

Singles
- 1997 Waldbaum's Hamlet Cup

Final
- Champion: (Spain) Carlos Moyá
- Runner-up: (Australia) Patrick Rafter
- Score: 6–4, 7–6^{(7–1)}

Details
- Draw: 32
- Seeds: 8

Events
Singles	Doubles
← 1996 ·	Waldbaum's Hamlet Cup	· 1998 →

The 1997 Waldbaum's Hamlet Cup was a men's tennis tournament played on Hard courts in Long Island, United States that was part of the International Series of the 1997 ATP Tour. It was the seventeenth edition of the tournament and was held from 18–24 August 1998.

== Seeds ==
Champion seeds are indicated in bold text while text in italics indicates the round in which those seeds were eliminated.

1. (United States) Michael Chang (quarterfinals)
2. (Croatia) Goran Ivanišević (quarterfinals)
3. (Russia) Yevgeny Kafelnikov (first round)
4. (Brazil) Gustavo Kuerten (second round)
5. (Spain) **Carlos Moyá (champions)**
6. (Sweden) Thomas Enqvist (semifinals)
7. Unknown (withdrew)
8. (Australia) Patrick Rafter (finale)

== Draw ==
=== Key ===
- Q = Qualifier
- WC = Wild card
- LL = Lucky loser
- Alt = Alternate
- SE = Special exempt
- PR = Protected ranking
- ITF = ITF entry
- JE = Junior exempt
- w/o = Walkover
- r = Retired
- d = Defaulted
- SR = Special ranking

=== Finals ===
Semifinals
8	**(Australia) Patrick Rafter**	**6**	**6**
6	(Sweden) Thomas Enqvist	4	4
5	**(Spain) Carlos Moyá**	**6**	**6**
(Spain) Julián Alonso	2	3

Final
8	(Australia) Patrick Rafter	4	6^{1}
5	**(Spain) Carlos Moyá**	**6**	**7**

=== Top half ===
First round
1	**(United States) M Chang**	**7**	**6**
(Ukraine) A Medvedev	6	4
**(Australia) T Woodbridge**	**6**	**6**
(Brazil) J Oncins	3	4
**(Czech Republic) B Ulihrach**	**6**	**6**
(Germany) D Prinosil	1	1
8	**(Australia) P Rafter**	**6**	3	**6**
(Slovakia) K Kučera	3	**6**	3
**(France) A Boetsch**	**6**	**7**
3	(Russia) Y Kafelnikov	4	6
**(United States) R Reneberg**	**6**	**6**
(Czech Republic) M Damm	3	2
**(France) C Pioline**	**6**	**6**
(Spain) A Portas	2	4
6	**(Sweden) T Enqvist**	**6**	**6**
(Sweden) T Johansson	3	3

Second round
1	**(United States) M Chang**	**6**	**6**
(Australia) T Woodbridge	0	2
(Czech Republic) B Ulihrach	5	5
8	**(Australia) P Rafter**	**7**	**7**
(France) A Boetsch	4	1
**(United States) R Reneberg**	**6**	**6**
(France) C Pioline	5	**6**	1
6	**(Sweden) T Enqvist**	**7**	4	**6**

Quarterfinals
1	(United States) M Chang	4	**6**	1
8	**(Australia) P Rafter**	**6**	3	**6**
(United States) R Reneberg	**7**	4	2
6	**(Sweden) T Enqvist**	5	**6**	**6**

Semifinals
8	**(Australia) P Rafter**	**6**	**6**
6	(Sweden) T Enqvist	4	4

=== Bottom half ===
First round
5	**(Spain) C Moyá**	0	**7**	**6**
(Spain) J Sánchez	**6**	5	2
**(Switzerland) M Rosset**	4	**6**	**6**
(Czech Republic) D Vacek	**6**	3	2
**(Germany) M-K Goellner**	3	**6**	**6**
(Australia) M Woodforde	**6**	4	2
4	**(Brazil) G Kuerten**	**6**	**7**
(Uruguay) M Filippini	4	6
**(Sweden) J Björkman**	**6**	**6**
(Spain) C Costa	2	0
**(Spain) J Alonso**	3	**6**	**6**
(Norway) C Ruud	**6**	4	0
**(Ecuador) N Lapentti**	**7**	**6**
(Netherlands) J Siemerink	6	4
2	**(Croatia) G Ivanišević**	**7**	**6**
(Paraguay) R Delgado	5	4

Second round
5	**(Spain) C Moyá**	**6**	3
(Switzerland) M Rosset	2	1^{r}
**(Germany) M-K Goellner**	**6**	**7**
4	(Brazil) G Kuerten	3	6
(Sweden) J Björkman	3	4
**(Spain) J Alonso**	**6**	**6**
(Ecuador) N Lapentti	**7**	2	6
2	**(Croatia) G Ivanišević**	5	**6**	**7**

Quarterfinals
5	**(Spain) C Moyá**	**6**	**6**
(Germany) M-K Goellner	4	4
**(Spain) J Alonso**	**7**	3	**6**
2	(Croatia) G Ivanišević	6	**6**	3

Semifinals
5	**(Spain) C Moyá**	**6**	**6**
(Spain) J Alonso	2	3
