= 1999 Kroger St. Jude International – Doubles =

Doubles
- 1999 Kroger St. Jude International

Final
- Champions: (Australia) Todd Woodbridge (Australia) Mark Woodforde
- Runners-up: (Canada) Sébastien Lareau (United States) Alex O'Brien
- Score: 6–3, 6–4

Details
- Draw: 24
- Seeds: 8

Events
| Singles | Doubles |
| ← 1998 · | U.S. National Indoor Championships | · 2000 → |

The 1999 Kroger St. Jude International was a men's tennis tournament played on indoor Hard courts in Memphis, United States, that was part of the Championship Series of the 1999 ATP Tour. It was the twenty-ninth edition of the tournament and was held 15 February – 21 February.

== Seeds ==
Champion seeds are indicated in bold text while text in italics indicates the round in which those seeds were eliminated.

1. (The Bahamas) Mark Knowles / (Canada) Daniel Nestor (quarterfinals)
2. (Australia) **Todd Woodbridge** / (Australia) **Mark Woodforde (champions)**
3. (South Africa) Ellis Ferreira / (United States) Rick Leach (quarterfinals)
4. (Canada) Sébastien Lareau / (United States) Alex O'Brien (final)
5. (United States) Richey Reneberg / (United States) Jonathan Stark (semifinals)
6. (United States) Jeff Tarango / (Czech Republic) Daniel Vacek (second round)
7. (Czech Republic) Jiří Novák / (Czech Republic) David Rikl (second round)
8. (United States) Jim Grabb / (United States) Jared Palmer (semifinals)

== Draw ==
=== Key ===
- Q = Qualifier
- WC = Wild card
- LL = Lucky loser
- Alt = Alternate
- ITF = ITF entry
- PR = Protected ranking
- SR = Special ranking
- SE = Special exempt
- JE = Junior exempt
- JR = Junior Accelerator Programme entrant
- CO = College Accelerator Programme entrant
- NG = Next Gen Accelerator Program entrant
- w/o = Walkover
- r = Retired
- d = Defaulted

=== Finals ===
Semifinals
8 | (United States) Jim Grabb (United States) Jared Palmer | 3 | 4
4 | (Canada) **Sébastien Lareau** **(United States) Alex O'Brien** | **6** | **6**
5 | (United States) Richey Reneberg (United States) Jonathan Stark | 4 | 4
2 | (Australia) **Todd Woodbridge** **(Australia) Mark Woodforde** | **6** | **6**

Final
4 | (Canada) Sébastien Lareau (United States) Alex O'Brien | 3 | 4
2 | (Australia) **Todd Woodbridge** **(Australia) Mark Woodforde** | **6** | **6**

=== Top half ===
First round
(Argentina) **Diego del Río** **(Argentina) Mariano Puerta** | **6** | **6**
(United States) P Goebel (Canada) K Harrietha | 3 | 4
(United States) **P Goldstein** **(United States) C Woodruff** | **6** | 3 | **6**
(Mexico) D Roditi (Australia) M Tebbutt | 4 | **6** | 1
(United States) **B Coupe** **(South Africa) P Rosner** | **6** | 6 | **6**
(United States) J Courier (Australia) S Draper | 4 | **7** | 4
(United States) **G Grant** **(United States) TJ Middleton** | **7** | **6**
(Argentina) P Albano (Argentina) D Orsanic | 6 | 4

Second round
1 | (The Bahamas) **M Knowles** **(Canada) D Nestor** | **6** | **6**
(Argentina) Diego del Río (Argentina) Mariano Puerta | 4 | 4
(United States) P Goldstein (United States) C Woodruff | 5 | 5
8 | (United States) **J Grabb** **(United States) J Palmer** | **7** | **7**
4 | (Canada) **S Lareau** **(United States) A O'Brien** | **6** | **6**
(United States) B Coupe (South Africa) P Rosner | 3 | 2
(United States) **G Grant** **(United States) TJ Middleton** | **7** | **7**
6 | (United States) J Tarango (Czech Republic) D Vacek | 5 | 5

Quarterfinals
1 | (The Bahamas) M Knowles (Canada) D Nestor | 6 | 6
8 | (United States) **J Grabb** **(United States) J Palmer** | **7** | **7**
4 | (Canada) **S Lareau** **(United States) A O'Brien** | **6** | **6**
(United States) G Grant (United States) TJ Middleton | 3 | 4

Semifinals
8 | (United States) J Grabb (United States) J Palmer | 3 | 4
4 | (Canada) **S Lareau** **(United States) A O'Brien** | **6** | **6**

=== Bottom half ===
First round
(South Africa) **G Stafford** **(South Africa) B Talbot** | **6** | **6**
(South Africa) L Bale (Australia) A Kratzmann | 4 | 2
(New Zealand) **J Greenhalgh** **(New Zealand) B Steven** | **6** | **6**
(United States) J-M Gambill (United States) T Gambill | 2 | 3
(United States) **D Flach** **(South Africa) B Haygarth** | **6** | **6**
(Spain) J Alonso (United States) D Bowen | 3 | 2
(United States) **B Bryan** **(United States) M Bryan** | **6** | **6**
(Brazil) F Meligeni (United States) J Waite | 3 | 4

Second round
5 | (United States) **R Reneberg** **(United States) J Stark** | **6** | 6 | **6**
(South Africa) G Stafford (South Africa) B Talbot | 4 | **7** | 4
(New Zealand) J Greenhalgh (New Zealand) B Steven | 6 | 5
3 | (South Africa) **E Ferreira** **(United States) R Leach** | **7** | **7**
7 | (Czech Republic) J Novák (Czech Republic) D Rikl | 4 | 5
(United States) **D Flach** **(South Africa) B Haygarth** | **6** | **7**
(United States) B Bryan (United States) M Bryan | 6 | 3
2 | (Australia) **T Woodbridge** **(Australia) M Woodforde** | **7** | **6**

Quarterfinals
5 | (United States) **R Reneberg** **(United States) J Stark** | **7** | **6**
3 | (South Africa) E Ferreira (United States) R Leach | 6 | 3
(United States) D Flach (South Africa) B Haygarth | 3 | 0
2 | (Australia) **T Woodbridge** **(Australia) M Woodforde** | **6** | **6**

Semifinals
5 | (United States) R Reneberg (United States) J Stark | 4 | 4
2 | (Australia) **T Woodbridge** **(Australia) M Woodforde** | **6** | **6**
