= 1999 Waldbaum's Hamlet Cup – Singles =

Singles
- 1999 Waldbaum's Hamlet Cup

Final
- Champion: (Sweden) Magnus Norman
- Runner-up: (Spain) Àlex Corretja
- Score: 7–6^{(7–4)}, 4–6, 6–3

Details
- Draw: 32 (3WC/4Q/1LL)
- Seeds: 8

Events
Singles	Doubles
← 1998 ·	Connecticut Open	· 2000 →

The 1999 Waldbaum's Hamlet Cup was a men's tennis tournament played on Hard courts in Long Island, United States that was part of the International Series of the 1999 ATP Tour. It was the nineteenth edition of the tournament and was held from 23–29 August 1999.

Patrick Rafter was the defending champion, but did not compete this year.

Magnus Norman won the title by defeating Àlex Corretja 7–6^{(7–4)}, 4–6, 6–3 in the final.

== Seeds ==
Champion seeds are indicated in bold text while text in italics indicates the round in which those seeds were eliminated.

1. (Russia) Yevgeny Kafelnikov (quarterfinals)
2. (Spain) Àlex Corretja (final)
3. (Spain) Carlos Moyá (first round)
4. Unknown (withdrew)
5. (Netherlands) Richard Krajicek (second round)
6. (Sweden) Thomas Johansson (quarterfinals, withdrew)
7. (Sweden) Thomas Enqvist (quarterfinals)
8. (Spain) Albert Costa (first round)

== Draw ==
=== Key ===
- Q = Qualifier
- WC = Wild card
- LL = Lucky loser
- Alt = Alternate
- SE = Special exempt
- PR = Protected ranking
- ITF = ITF entry
- JE = Junior exempt
- w/o = Walkover
- r = Retired
- d = Defaulted
- SR = Special ranking

=== Finals ===
Semifinals
**(Sweden) Magnus Norman**	**7**	6	**6**
(Australia) Jason Stoltenberg	6^{3}	**7**	3
(Czech Republic) Daniel Vacek	4	1
2/WC	**(Spain) Àlex Corretja**	**6**	**6**

Final
**(Sweden) Magnus Norman**	**7**	4	**6**
2/WC	(Spain) Àlex Corretja	6^{4}	**6**	3

=== Top half ===
First round
1	**(Russia) Y Kafelnikov**	**6**	**6**
Q	(Philippines) E Taino	3	4
**(France) F Santoro**	3	**6**	**7**
Q	(Germany) B Karbacher	**6**	3	6^{4}
**(Sweden) M Norman**	**6**	**6**
(Austria) S Koubek	4	2
LL	**(Argentina) M Puerta**	**6**	**6**
8	(Spain) A Costa	4	1
**(Brazil) F Meligeni**	6^{1}	**7**	**6**
3/WC	(Spain) C Moyá	**7**	6^{2}	3
**(Australia) J Stoltenberg**	**6**	**6**
(Spain) F Vicente	2	4
**(Morocco) Y El Aynaoui**	**7**	**6**
(Spain) F Clavet	5	1
6	**(Sweden) T Johansson**	5	**6**	**6**
(Argentina) M Zabaleta	**7**	4	3

Second round
1	**(Russia) Y Kafelnikov**	**7**	**6**
(France) F Santoro	6^{6}	0
**(Sweden) M Norman**	**6**	**6**
LL	(Argentina) M Puerta	3	3
(Brazil) F Meligeni	4	1
**(Australia) J Stoltenberg**	**6**	**6**
(Morocco) Y El Aynaoui	4	6^{3}
6	**(Sweden) T Johansson**	**6**	**7**

Quarterfinals
1	(Russia) Y Kafelnikov	**6**	3	1
**(Sweden) M Norman**	3	**6**	**6**
**(Australia) J Stoltenberg**	w/o
6	(Sweden) T Johansson

Semifinals
**(Sweden) M Norman**	**7**	6	**6**
(Australia) J Stoltenberg	6^{3}	**7**	3

=== Bottom half ===
First round
5/WC	**(Netherlands) R Krajicek**	**6**	**6**
(United States) J-M Gambill	4	3
**(Czech Republic) B Ulihrach**	1	**6**	**6**
(Czech Republic) J Novák	**6**	3	2
**(Norway) C Ruud**	**6**	**6**
(Netherlands) J Siemerink	3	3
**(Czech Republic) D Vacek**	**6**	**6**
Q	(United States) K Kim	4	2
7	**(Sweden) T Enqvist**	4	**7**	**6**
(Sweden) M Larsson	**6**	6^{3}	1
**(Croatia) G Ivanišević**	**6**	**6**
(France) A Di Pasquale	2	3
Q	**(Czech Republic) M Damm**	**6**	**6**
(Ukraine) A Medvedev	1	4
2/WC	**(Spain) À Corretja**	6^{4}	**6**	**6**
(Switzerland) M Rosset	**7**	3	4

Second round
5/WC	(Netherlands) R Krajicek	3	4
**(Czech Republic) B Ulihrach**	**6**	**6**
(Norway) C Ruud	3	3
**(Czech Republic) D Vacek**	**6**	**6**
7	**(Sweden) T Enqvist**	**6**	**6**
(Croatia) G Ivanišević	4	2
Q	(Czech Republic) M Damm	1	**6**	0
2/WC	**(Spain) Àlex Corretja**	**6**	3	**6**

Quarterfinals
(Czech Republic) B Ulihrach	2	3
**(Czech Republic) D Vacek**	**6**	**6**
7	(Sweden) T Enqvist	6^{8}	**6**	6^{1}
2/WC	**(Spain) Àlex Corretja**	**7**	2	**7**

Semifinals
(Czech Republic) D Vacek	4	1
2/WC	**(Spain) Àlex Corretja**	**6**	**6**

== Qualifying ==
=== Qualifying seeds ===
1. (Argentina) Mariano Puerta (qualifying competition, retired, **Lucky loser**)
2. (Germany) **Bernd Karbacher (qualified)**
3. (Switzerland) Roger Federer (second round)
4. (Czech Republic) **Martin Damm (qualified)**
5. (Zimbabwe) Wayne Black (qualifying competition)
6. (Spain) Jacobo Díaz (first round)
7. (Chile) Nicolás Massú (first round)
8. (Czech Republic) Tomáš Zíb (second round)

=== Qualifiers ===
1. (United States) **Kevin Kim**
2. (Germany) **Bernd Karbacher**
3. (Philippines) **Eric Taino**
4. (Czech Republic) **Martin Damm**

=== Lucky loser ===
1. (Argentina) **Mariano Puerta**

=== Qualifying draw ===
==== First qualifier ====
First round
1	**(Argentina) Mariano Puerta**	**6**	**7**
(United States) Oren Motevassel	2	5
**(United Kingdom) Martin Lee**	**6**	**6**
WC	(Denmark) Kristian Pless	2	3
(United Kingdom) Arvind Parmar	**7**	6	2
**(United Kingdom) Luke Milligan**	5	**7**	**6**
**(United States) Kevin Kim**	1	**6**	**6**
7	(Chile) Nicolás Massú	**6**	3	2

Second round
1	**(Argentina) Mariano Puerta**	**6**	**7**
(United Kingdom) Martin Lee	4	5
(United Kingdom) Luke Milligan	3	1
**(United States) Kevin Kim**	**6**	**6**

Qualifying competition
1	(Argentina) Mariano Puerta	5^{r}
**(United States) Kevin Kim**	6

==== Second qualifier ====
First round
2	**(Germany) Bernd Karbacher**	**6**	1	**7**
(Israel) Lior Mor	4	**6**	6
**(United Kingdom) Miles Maclagan**	**6**	3	**6**
(Canada) Frédéric Niemeyer	2	**6**	2
(United States) Taylor Dent	6	3
**(France) Julien Boutter**	**7**	**6**
(Israel) Ofer Sela	2	**6**	3
8	**(Czech Republic) Tomáš Zíb**	**6**	3	**6**

Second round
2	**(Germany) Bernd Karbacher**	**6**	**7**
(United Kingdom) Miles Maclagan	1	5
**(France) Julien Boutter**	**7**	4	**6**
8	(Czech Republic) Tomáš Zíb	6	**6**	3

Qualifying competition
2	**(Germany) Bernd Karbacher**	**6**	**6**
(France) Julien Boutter	3	4

==== Third qualifier ====
First round
3	**(Switzerland) Roger Federer**	**6**	3	**7**
WC	(United States) Todd Meringoff	4	**6**	6
WC	**(Philippines) Eric Taino**	**6**	**6**
(Brazil) Alexandre Simoni	3	3
(South Africa) Damien Roberts	3	2
**(Belgium) Timothy Aerts**	**6**	**6**
WC	**(Chile) Fernando González**	3	**6**	**7**
6	(Spain) Jacobo Díaz	**6**	0	6

Second round
3	(Switzerland) Roger Federer	1	4
WC	**(Philippines) Eric Taino**	**6**	**6**
(Belgium) Timothy Aerts	2	6
WC	**(Chile) Fernando González**	**6**	**7**

Qualifying competition
WC	**(Philippines) Eric Taino**	**6**	**7**
WC	(Chile) Fernando González	4	6

==== Fourth qualifier ====
First round
4	**(Czech Republic) Martin Damm**	**6**	**7**
(Australia) Mark Draper	4	6
**(Germany) Marc-Kevin Goellner**	**6**	**6**
(Australia) Scott Draper	4	4
**(France) Lionel Roux**	**6**	**6**
(Thailand) Danai Udomchoke	4	2
(Israel) Eyal Ran	3	0^{r}
5	**(Zimbabwe) Wayne Black**	**6**	3

Second round
4	**(Czech Republic) Martin Damm**	**6**	**6**
(Germany) Marc-Kevin Goellner	2	2
(France) Lionel Roux	4	6
5	**(Zimbabwe) Wayne Black**	**6**	**7**

Qualifying competition
4	**(Czech Republic) Martin Damm**	**6**	**6**
5	(Zimbabwe) Wayne Black	0	2
