= 1998 Kroger St. Jude International – Doubles =

Doubles
- 1998 Kroger St. Jude International

Final
- Champions: (Australia) Todd Woodbridge (Australia) Mark Woodforde
- Runners-up: (South Africa) Ellis Ferreira (Mexico) David Roditi
- Score: 6–3, 6–4

Details
- Draw: 24
- Seeds: 8

Events
| Singles | Doubles |
| ← 1997 · | U.S. National Indoor Championships | · 1999 → |

The 1998 Kroger St. Jude International was a men's tennis tournament played on indoor Hard courts in Memphis, United States, that was part of the International Series Gold of the 1998 ATP Tour. It was the 28th edition of the tournament and was held 16–22 February 1998.

== Seeds ==
Champion seeds are indicated in bold text while text in italics indicates the round in which those seeds were eliminated.

1. (Australia) **Todd Woodbridge** / (Australia) **Mark Woodforde (champions)**
2. (Netherlands) Jacco Eltingh / (Netherlands) Paul Haarhuis (second round)
3. (United States) Alex O'Brien / (United States) Jonathan Stark (quarterfinals)
4. (Argentina) Luis Lobo / (Spain) Javier Sánchez (semifinals)
5. (Australia) Sandon Stolle / (Czech Republic) Cyril Suk (second round)
6. (Brazil) Gustavo Kuerten / (Brazil) Fernando Meligeni (second round)
7. (South Africa) Ellis Ferreira / (Mexico) David Roditi (final)
8. (Ecuador) Nicolás Lapentti / (Argentina) Daniel Orsanic (quarterfinals)

== Draw ==
=== Key ===
- Q = Qualifier
- WC = Wild card
- LL = Lucky loser
- Alt = Alternate
- SE = Special exempt
- PR = Protected ranking
- ITF = ITF entry
- JE = Junior exempt
- w/o = Walkover
- r = Retired
- d = Defaulted
- SR = Special ranking

=== Finals ===
Semifinals
1 | (Australia) **Todd Woodbridge** **(Australia) Mark Woodforde** | **6** | **6**
4 | (Argentina) Luis Lobo (Spain) Javier Sánchez | 3 | 4
(Australia) David Macpherson (United States) Richey Reneberg | 3 | 3
7 | (South Africa) **Ellis Ferreira** **(Mexico) David Roditi** | **6** | **6**

Final
1 | (Australia) **Todd Woodbridge** **(Australia) Mark Woodforde** | **6** | **6**
7 | (South Africa) Ellis Ferreira (Mexico) David Roditi | 3 | 4

=== Top half ===
First round
(Sweden) **T Nydahl** **(Netherlands) S Schalken** | **6** | **7**
(United States) K Kinnear (Spain) A Martín | 2 | 6
(United States) **S Davis** **(United States) T Martin** | **7** | **6**
(Zimbabwe) B Black (United States) B MacPhie | 6 | 3
(United States) **M Keil** **(United States) T. J. Middleton** | **7** | **7**
(Germany) T Haas (Australia) M Philippoussis | 6 | 6
(United States) **D Randall** **(United States) J Waite** | **6** | **6**
(United States) L Jensen (United States) M Jensen | 1 | 2

Second round
1 | (Australia) **T Woodbridge** **(Australia) M Woodforde** | **6** | **6**
(Sweden) T Nydahl (Netherlands) S Schalken | 3 | 3
(United States) S Davis (United States) T Martin | **6** | 2 | 1
8 | (Ecuador) **N Lapentti** **(Argentina) D Orsanic** | 2 | **6** | **6**
4 | (Argentina) **L Lobo** **(Spain) J Sánchez** | **6** | **7**
(United States) M Keil (United States) T. J. Middleton | 3 | 5
(United States) **D Randall** **(United States) J Waite** | 3 | **7** | **7**
6 | (Brazil) G Kuerten (Brazil) F Meligeni | **6** | 6 | 6

Quarterfinals
1 | (Australia) **T Woodbridge** **(Australia) M Woodforde** | **6** | **6**
8 | (Ecuador) N Lapentti (Argentina) D Orsanic | 2 | 3
4 | (Argentina) **L Lobo** **(Spain) J Sánchez** | **7** | 3 | **6**
(United States) D Randall (United States) J Waite | 5 | **6** | 3

Semifinals
1 | (Australia) **T Woodbridge** **(Australia) M Woodforde** | **6** | **6**
4 | (Argentina) L Lobo (Spain) J Sánchez | 3 | 4

=== Bottom half ===
First round
(Australia) **D Macpherson** **(United States) R Reneberg** | **6** | **6**
(Zimbabwe) W Black (United States) J Salzenstein | 3 | 2
(United States) **D Flach** **(United States) G Van Emburgh** | 3 | **6** | **6**
(United States) B Coupe (South Africa) P Rosner | **6** | 1 | 2
(United States) **J Courier** **(Armenia) S Sargsian** | **6** | **6**
(United States) D Bowen (United States) V Spadea | 3 | 2
(Sweden) **T Enqvist** **(Chile) M Ríos** | **7** | **7**
(South Africa) G Stafford (Australia) M Tebbutt | 6 | 6

Second round
5 | (Australia) S Stolle (Czech Republic) C Suk | **6** | 3 | 6
(Australia) **D Macpherson** **(United States) R Reneberg** | 3 | **6** | **7**
(United States) D Flach (United States) G Van Emburgh | 2 | 2
3 | (United States) **A O'Brien** **(United States) J Stark** | **6** | **6**
7 | (South Africa) **E Ferreira** **(Mexico) D Roditi** | **6** | **6**
(United States) J Courier (Armenia) S Sargsian | 4 | 2
(Sweden) **T Enqvist** **(Chile) M Ríos** | **7** | **7**
2 | (Netherlands) J Eltingh (Netherlands) P Haarhuis | 5 | 6

Quarterfinals
(Australia) **D Macpherson** **(United States) R Reneberg** | **7** | **6**
3 | (United States) A O'Brien (United States) J Stark | 6 | 1
7 | (South Africa) **E Ferreira** **(Mexico) D Roditi** | **6** | **6**
(Sweden) T Enqvist (Chile) M Ríos | 4 | 3

Semifinals
(Australia) D Macpherson (United States) R Reneberg | 3 | 3
7 | (South Africa) **E Ferreira** **(Mexico) D Roditi** | **6** | **6**
