= 1995 Kroger St. Jude International – Singles =

Singles
- 1995 Kroger St. Jude International

Final
- Champion: (United States) Todd Martin
- Runner-up: (Netherlands) Paul Haarhuis
- Score: 7–6^{(7–2)}, 6–4

Details
- Draw: 48 (4WC/6Q)
- Seeds: 16

Events
Singles	Doubles
← 1994 ·	U.S. National Indoor Championships	· 1996 →

Todd Martin was the defending champion and successfully defended his title, by defeating Paul Haarhuis 7–6^{(7–2)}, 6–4 in the final.

== Seeds ==
All seeds received a bye into the second round.

1. (United States) Pete Sampras (semifinals)
2. (United States) Michael Chang (quarterfinals)
3. (United States) Todd Martin (champion)
4. (Netherlands) Jacco Eltingh (second round)
5. (United States) Aaron Krickstein (third round)
6. (Peru) Jaime Yzaga (third round)
7. (Russia) Andrei Chesnokov (second round)
8. (United States) MaliVai Washington (second round)
9. (United States) Jared Palmer (third round)
10. (Sweden) Thomas Enqvist (quarterfinals)
11. (Netherlands) Paul Haarhuis (final)
12. (United States) Patrick McEnroe (second round)
13. (France) Arnaud Boetsch (quarterfinals)
14. (United States) Richey Reneberg (third round)
15. (Uruguay) Marcelo Filippini (third round)
16. (United States) Vince Spadea (third round)

== Draw ==
=== Key ===
- Q = Qualifier
- WC = Wild card
- LL = Lucky loser
- Alt = Alternate
- SE = Special exempt
- PR = Protected ranking
- ITF = ITF entry
- JE = Junior exempt
- w/o = Walkover
- r = Retired
- d = Defaulted
- SR = Special ranking

=== Finals ===
Quarterfinals
1	(United States) Pete Sampras	7	3	6
10	(Sweden) Thomas Enqvist	5	6	3
3	(United States) Todd Martin	6^{8}	7	6
(Canada) Greg Rusedski	7^{10}	5	4
11	(Netherlands) Paul Haarhuis	6	6
13	(France) Arnaud Boetsch	2	3
(United States) Jonathan Stark	4	6	6
2	(United States) Michael Chang	6	3	4

Semifinals
1	(United States) Pete Sampras	6	6^{6}	4
3	(United States) Todd Martin	4	7^{8}	6
11	(Netherlands) Paul Haarhuis	6	7
(United States) Jonathan Stark	4	5

Final
3	(United States) Todd Martin	7^{7}	6
11	(Netherlands) Paul Haarhuis	6^{2}	4

=== Top half ===
==== Section 1 ====
First round
(South Africa) M Ondruska	6	6^{5}	2
Q	(Australia) G Doyle	4	7^{7}	6
(Chile) M Ríos	6	7
WC	(Canada) A Sznajder	1	5
(Sweden) A Järryd	6	6
(Venezuela) N Pereira	4	2
(New Zealand) B Steven	6	6
(Norway) C Ruud	2	4

Second round
1	(United States) P Sampras	6	6
Q	(Australia) G Doyle	1	0
(Chile) M Ríos	4	1
15	(Uruguay) M Filippini	6	6
10	(Sweden) T Enqvist	6	6
(Sweden) A Järryd	3	1
(New Zealand) B Steven	4	7^{7}	6
7	(Russia) A Chesnokov	6	6^{1}	2

Third round
1	(United States) P Sampras	6	6
15	(Uruguay) M Filippini	2	2
10	(Sweden) T Enqvist	6	6
(New Zealand) B Steven	4	1

Quarterfinals
1	(United States) P Sampras	7	3	6
10	(Sweden) T Enqvist	5	6	3

==== Section 2 ====
First round
(Germany) A Mronz	7^{7}	6
(Brazil) L Mattar	6^{1}	3
(Australia) J Morgan	7^{7}	6
(United States) J Tarango	6^{5}	3
WC	(United States) M Jensen	1	3
(Canada) G Rusedski	6	6
(United States) B Gilbert	1	6	6
Q	(United States) L Gloria	6	4	4

Second round
3	(United States) T Martin	7	6
(Germany) A Mronz	5	4
(Australia) J Morgan	4	1
14	(United States) R Reneberg	6	6
12	(United States) P McEnroe	6^{4}	6^{4}
(Canada) G Rusedski	7^{7}	7^{7}
(United States) B Gilbert	1	6^{4}
5	(United States) A Krickstein	6	7^{7}

Third round
3	(United States) T Martin	6	6
14	(United States) R Reneberg	1	4
(Canada) G Rusedski	6	7^{7}
5	(United States) A Krickstein	4	6^{4}

Quarterfinals
3	(United States) T Martin	6^{8}	7	6
(Canada) G Rusedski	7^{10}	5	4

=== Bottom half ===
==== Section 3 ====
First round
Q	(United States) K Thorne	6^{2}	7^{7}	4
WC	(United States) B Dunn	7^{7}	6^{5}	6
(Germany) MK Goellner	1	6	6
(France) G Raoux	6	2	4
(Sweden) N Kulti	6	3	4
(United States) B Shelton	4	6	6
(Czech Republic) D Rikl	6	4	4
(Germany) L Rehmann	2	6	6

Second round
6	(Peru) J Yzaga	6	6
WC	(United States) B Dunn	4	3
(Germany) MK Goellner	4	4
11	(Netherlands) P Haarhuis	6	6
13	(France) A Boetsch	w/o
(United States) B Shelton
(Germany) L Rehmann	7^{7}	4	6
4	(Netherlands) J Eltingh	6^{2}	6	2

Third round
6	(Peru) J Yzaga	4	6	3
11	(Netherlands) P Haarhuis	6	3	6
13	(France) A Boetsch	2	7^{8}	7
(Germany) L Rehmann	6	6^{6}	5

Quarterfinals
11	(Netherlands) P Haarhuis	6	6
13	(France) A Boetsch	2	3

==== Section 4 ====
First round
(United States) J Stark	6	6^{5}	6
(United States) A O'Brien	4	7^{7}	1
Q	(United Kingdom) M Petchey	6^{3}	3
(United States) J Grabb	7^{7}	6
Q	(Australia) M Tebbutt	4	6	6
(Brazil) F Meligeni	6	3	3
Q	(United States) M Joyce	4	5
WC	(United States) L Jensen	6	7

Second round
8	(United States) MV Washington	4	6	2
(United States) J Stark	6	3	6
(United States) J Grabb	7^{9}	3	3
9	(United States) J Palmer	6^{7}	6	6
16	(United States) V Spadea	6	6
Q	(Australia) M Tebbutt	3	4
WC	(United States) L Jensen	6^{4}	5
2	(United States) M Chang	7^{7}	7

Third round
(United States) J Stark	6	7^{7}
9	(United States) J Palmer	4	6^{5}
16	(United States) V Spadea	6	1	4
2	(United States) M Chang	2	6	6

Quarterfinals
(United States) J Stark	4	6	6
2	(United States) M Chang	6	3	4
