= 1995 Kroger St. Jude International – Doubles =

Doubles
- 1995 Kroger St. Jude International

Final
- Champions: (United States) Jared Palmer (United States) Richey Reneberg
- Runners-up: (United States) Tommy Ho (New Zealand) Brett Steven
- Score: 4–6, 7–6, 6–1

Details
- Draw: 24
- Seeds: 8

Events
Singles	Doubles
← 1994 ·	U.S. National Indoor Championships	· 1996 →

Byron Black and Jonathan Stark were the defending champions, but Black did not compete this year. Stark teamed up with Todd Martin and lost in the quarterfinals to Mark Knowles and Daniel Nestor.

Jared Palmer and Richey Reneberg won the title by defeating Tommy Ho and Brett Steven 4–6, 7–6, 6–1 in the final.

== Seeds ==
All seeds received a bye into the second round.

1. (Netherlands) Jacco Eltingh / (Netherlands) Paul Haarhuis (second round)
2. (United States) Jared Palmer / (United States) Richey Reneberg (champions)
3. (United States) Alex O'Brien / (Australia) Sandon Stolle (quarterfinals)
4. (United States) Jim Grabb / (United States) Patrick McEnroe (second round)
5. (The Bahamas) Mark Knowles / (Canada) Daniel Nestor (semifinals)
6. (Australia) John Fitzgerald / (Sweden) Anders Järryd (semifinals)
7. (Canada) Sébastien Lareau / (Italy) Diego Nargiso (second round)
8. (United States) Trevor Kronemann / (Australia) David Macpherson (quarterfinals)

== Draw ==
=== Key ===
- Q = Qualifier
- WC = Wild card
- LL = Lucky loser
- Alt = Alternate
- SE = Special exempt
- PR = Protected ranking
- ITF = ITF entry
- JE = Junior exempt
- w/o = Walkover
- r = Retired
- d = Defaulted
- SR = Special ranking

=== Finals ===
Semifinals
(United States) Tommy Ho (New Zealand) Brett Steven	6	6
6	(Australia) John Fitzgerald (Sweden) Anders Järryd	2	2
5	(The Bahamas) Mark Knowles (Canada) Daniel Nestor	6	6
2	(United States) Jared Palmer (United States) Richey Reneberg	7	7

Final
(United States) Tommy Ho (New Zealand) Brett Steven	6	6	1
2	(United States) Jared Palmer (United States) Richey Reneberg	4	7	6

=== Top half ===
First round
(Australia) A Florent (Zimbabwe) K Ullyett	7	6	5
(United States) T Ho (New Zealand) B Steven	5	7	7
WC	(Sweden) R Bergh (United States) J Pugh	6	7	6
(South Africa) M Ondruska (South Africa) D Visser	7	6	7
Q	(India) L Paes (Sweden) LA Wahlgren	6	6	6
(South Africa) E Ferreira (United States) D Randall	7	4	2
(United States) L Jensen (United States) M Jensen	4	6	6
(United Kingdom) N Broad (United States) G Van Emburgh	6	3	4

Second round
1	(Netherlands) J Eltingh (Netherlands) P Haarhuis	6	3	4
(United States) T Ho (New Zealand) B Steven	3	6	6
(South Africa) M Ondruska (South Africa) D Visser	6	6	4
8	(United States) T Kronemann (Australia) D Macpherson	7	3	6
3	(United States) A O'Brien (Australia) S Stolle	6	7
(South Africa) E Ferreira (United States) D Randall	4	6
(United States) L Jensen (United States) M Jensen	6	4
6	(Australia) J Fitzgerald (Sweden) A Järryd	7	6

Quarterfinals
(United States) T Ho (New Zealand) B Steven	7	2	7
8	(United States) T Kronemann (Australia) D Macpherson	6	6	6
3	(United States) A O'Brien (Australia) S Stolle	5	6	3
6	(Australia) J Fitzgerald (Sweden) A Järryd	7	4	6

Semifinals
(United States) T Ho (New Zealand) B Steven	6	6
6	(Australia) J Fitzgerald (Sweden) A Järryd	2	2

=== Bottom half ===
First round
WC	(United States) P Annacone (United States) P Sampras	6	7
(United States) R Leach (United States) S Melville	3	5
WC	(United States) T Martin (United States) J Stark	7	4	6
(United States) S Davis (United States) B MacPhie	6	6	3
(South Africa) B Haygarth (South Africa) B Talbot	6	6
(United States) M Bauer (Germany) MK Goellner	7	7
WC	(United States) K Jones (United States) D Pate	0	7	6
(Sweden) N Kulti (Sweden) M Tillström	6	5	1

Second round
5	(The Bahamas) M Knowles (Canada) D Nestor	6	7
WC	(United States) P Annacone (United States) P Sampras	2	6
WC	(United States) T Martin (United States) J Stark	6	4	7
4	(United States) J Grabb (United States) P McEnroe	3	6	5
7	(Canada) S Lareau (Italy) D Nargiso	5	3
(United States) M Bauer (Germany) MK Goellner	7	6
WC	(United States) K Jones (United States) D Pate	4	3
2	(United States) J Palmer (United States) R Reneberg	6	6

Quarterfinals
5	(The Bahamas) M Knowles (Canada) D Nestor	6	4	7
WC	(United States) T Martin (United States) J Stark	4	6	6
(United States) M Bauer (Germany) MK Goellner	7	3	6
2	(United States) J Palmer (United States) R Reneberg	5	6	7

Semifinals
5	(The Bahamas) M Knowles (Canada) D Nestor	6	6
2	(United States) J Palmer (United States) R Reneberg	7	7
