= 1996 Genovese Hamlet Cup – Singles =

Singles
- 1996 Genovese Hamlet Cup

Final
- Champion: (Ukraine) Andriy Medvedev
- Runner-up: (Czech Republic) Martin Damm
- Score: 7–5, 6–3

Details
- Draw: 32
- Seeds: 8

Events
Singles	Doubles
← 1995 ·	Genovese Hamlet Cup	· 1997 →

Yevgeny Kafelnikov was the defending champion but did not compete that year.

Andriy Medvedev won in the final 7–5, 6–3 against Martin Damm.

== Seeds ==
A champion seed is indicated in bold text while text in italics indicates the round in which that seed was eliminated.

1. (United States) Michael Chang (quarterfinals)
2. n/a
3. (United States) Richey Reneberg (second round)
4. (Netherlands) Jan Siemerink (first round)
5. (Ukraine) **Andriy Medvedev (champion)**
6. (Morocco) Younes El Aynaoui (second round)
7. (Germany) Hendrik Dreekmann (first round)
8. (Sweden) Magnus Larsson (first round)

== Draw ==
=== Key ===
- Q = Qualifier
- WC = Wild card
- LL = Lucky loser
- Alt = Alternate
- SE = Special exempt
- PR = Protected ranking
- ITF = ITF entry
- JE = Junior exempt
- w/o = Walkover
- r = Retired
- d = Defaulted
- SR = Special ranking

First round
1	(United States) **M Chang**	**6**	**6**
(Germany) D Prinosil	1	3
WC	(Russia) A Cherkasov	**6**	3	6^{5}
(Spain) **S Bruguera**	3	**6**	**7^{7}**
Q	(Argentina) G Cañas	**6**	3	4
(Slovakia) **K Kučera**	2	**6**	**6**
(Morocco) **H Arazi**	**6**	2	**6**
8	(Sweden) M Larsson	3	**6**	4
4	(Netherlands) J Siemerink	4	4
WC	(United States) **J Stark**	**6**	**6**
(United States) **V Spadea**	**7^{10}**	**6**
(Russia) A Chesnokov	6^{8}	4
(Venezuela) N Pereira	6^{8}	**6**	3
(Slovakia) **J Krošlák**	**7^{10}**	3	**6**
(Russia) A Volkov	**6**	2	2
WC/5	(Ukraine) **A Medvedev**	4	**6**	**6**
6	(Morocco) **Y El Aynaoui**	**6**	**6**
(Ecuador) N Lapentti	4	3
Q	(Belarus) M Mirnyi	2	6^{4}
(Czech Republic) **M Damm**	**6**	**7^{7}**
(United States) **M Joyce**	**6**	6^{5}	**7^{7}**
(Argentina) J Frana	3	**7^{7}**	6^{3}
(Japan) S Matsuoka	4	2
3	(United States) **R Reneberg**	**6**	**6**
7	(Germany) H Dreekmann	3	4
(Romania) **A Voinea**	**6**	**6**
Q	(Canada) A Chang	**7**	3	5
Q	(Israel) **N Welgreen**	5	**6**	**7**
(Italy) S Pescosolido	3	4
(Sweden) **T Johansson**	**6**	**6**
(France) S Simian	3	6^{6}
LL	(Netherlands) **F Wibier**	**6**	**7^{8}**

Second round
1	(United States) **M Chang**	**6**	**6**
(Spain) S Bruguera	3	2
(Slovakia) **K Kučera**	**7^{7}**	**7**
(Morocco) H Arazi	6^{4}	5
WC	(United States) **J Stark**	**6**	6^{5}	**7^{7}**
(United States) V Spadea	2	**7^{7}**	6^{3}
(Slovakia) J Krošlák	3	2
WC/5	(Ukraine) **A Medvedev**	**6**	**6**
6	(Morocco) Y El Aynaoui	**7**	3	0/r
(Czech Republic) **M Damm**	5	**6**	**3**
(United States) **M Joyce**	3	**6**	**6**
3	(United States) R Renebergt	**6**	4	3
(Romania) **A Voinea**	5	**6**	**6**
Q	(Israel) N Welgreen	**7**	0	2
(Sweden) **T Johansson**	**6**	**6**
LL	(Netherlands) F Wibier	3	3

Quarterfinals
1	(United States) M Chang	4	4
(Slovakia) **K Kučera**	**6**	**6**
WC	(United States) J Stark	6^{4}	**6**	3
WC/5	(Ukraine) **A Medvedev**	**7^{7}**	4	**6**
(Czech Republic) **M Damm**	5	**6**	**6**
(United States) M Joyce	**7**	2	3
(Romania) **A Voinea**	**7^{7}**	**6**
(Sweden) T Johansson	6^{4}	2

Semifinals
(Slovakia) K Kučera	6^{0}	3
WC/5	(Ukraine) **A Medvedev**	**7^{7}**	**6**
(Czech Republic) **M Damm**	5	**7**	**7**
(Romania) A Voinea	**7**	5	5

Final
WC/5	(Ukraine) **A Medvedev**	**7**	**6**
(Czech Republic) Martin Damm	5	3
