= 1997 Kroger St. Jude International – Singles =

Singles
- 1997 Kroger St. Jude International

Final
- Champion: (United States) Michael Chang
- Runner-up: (Australia) Todd Woodbridge
- Score: 6–3, 6–4

Details
- Draw: 48
- Seeds: 16

Events
Singles	Doubles
← 1996 ·	U.S. National Indoor Championships	· 1998 →

Pete Sampras was the defending champion but did not compete that year.

Michael Chang won in the final 6–3, 6–4 against Todd Woodbridge.

== Seeds ==
All sixteen seeds received a bye to the second round.

1. (United States) Michael Chang (champion)
2. (United States) Andre Agassi (second round)
3. (United States) Todd Martin (semifinals)
4. (United States) MaliVai Washington (second round)
5. (Netherlands) Paul Haarhuis (quarterfinals)
6. (Australia) Jason Stoltenberg (second round)
7. (United States) Richey Reneberg (quarterfinals)
8. (Australia) Todd Woodbridge (final)
9. (United States) Alex O'Brien (second round)
10. (Australia) Mark Philippoussis (second round)
11. n/a
12. (United States) Chris Woodruff (third round)
13. (Sweden) Jonas Björkman (semifinals)
14. (Australia) Mark Woodforde (second round)
15. (Denmark) Kenneth Carlsen (third round)
16. (United States) Vince Spadea (second round)

== Draw ==
=== Key ===
- Q = Qualifier
- WC = Wild card
- LL = Lucky loser
- Alt = Alternate
- ITF = ITF entry
- PR = Protected ranking
- SR = Special ranking
- SE = Special exempt
- JE = Junior exempt
- JR = Junior Accelerator Programme entrant
- CO = College Accelerator Programme entrant
- NG = Next Gen Accelerator Program entrant
- w/o = Walkover
- r = Retired
- d = Defaulted

=== Finals ===
Semifinals
1	(United States) Michael Chang	3	6	6
3	(United States) Todd Martin	6	4	4
13	(Sweden) Jonas Björkman	1	5
8	(Australia) Todd Woodbridge	6	7

Final
1	(United States) Michael Chang	6	6
8	(Australia) Todd Woodbridge	3	4

=== Top half ===
==== Section 1 ====
First round
(South Africa) G Stafford	4	3
(Australia) P Rafter	6	6
WC	(Netherlands) J Eltingh	6	6
Q	(United States) J-M Gambill	3	3
(Armenia) S Sargsian	6^{1}	7^{7}	6
(United States) J Stark	7^{7}	6^{4}	4
(Netherlands) S Schalken	4	6	0
(Spain) J A Viloca	6	4	6

Second round
1	(United States) M Chang	6	6
(Australia) P Rafter	2	4
WC	(Netherlands) J Eltingh	6^{6}	3
15	(Denmark) K Carlsen	7^{8}	6
9	(United States) A O'Brien	4	4
(Armenia) S Sargsian	6	6
(Spain) J A Viloca	3	2
7	(United States) R Reneberg	6	6

Third round
1	(United States) M Chang	6^{2}	6	6
15	(Denmark) K Carlsen	7^{7}	2	0
(Armenia) S Sargsian	2	6	3
7	(United States) R Reneberg	6	2	6

Quarterfinals
1	(United States) M Chang	6^{4}	6	6
7	(United States) R Reneberg	7^{7}	2	0

==== Section 2 ====
First round
Q	(United States) B Shelton	5	7^{7}	6
Q	(United States) S Bryan	7	6^{4}	4
(Sweden) T Johansson	4	4
(France) G Raoux	6	6
(New Zealand) B Steven	6	6
(South Africa) M Ondruska	3	4
(Germany) A Rădulescu	7	4	6
(United States) M Joyce	5	6	0

Second round
3	(United States) T Martin	6	6
Q	(United States) B Shelton	4	4
(France) G Raoux	7	5	6
14	(Australia) M Woodforde	5	7	4
LL	(Ecuador) N Lapentti	6^{2}	4
(New Zealand) B Steven	7^{7}	6
(Germany) A Rădulescu	6	6
6	(Australia) J Stoltenberg	3	2

Third round
3	(United States) T Martin	6	6^{2}	7^{7}
(France) G Raoux	4	7^{7}	6^{0}
(New Zealand) B Steven	7^{7}	6
(Germany) A Rădulescu	6^{4}	4

Quarterfinals
3	(United States) T Martin	6	7^{7}
(New Zealand) B Steven	4	6^{3}

=== Bottom half ===
==== Section 3 ====
First round
Q	(United States) J Gimelstob	4	6	7^{7}
Q	(United States) J Grabb	6	3	6^{4}
WC	(United States) L Jensen	6^{3}	5
(Australia) S Draper	7^{7}	7
WC	(United States) P McEnroe	6^{1}	3
(Australia) R Fromberg	7^{7}	6
(Uruguay) M Filippini	4	4
(Argentina) J Frana	6	6

Second round
5	(Netherlands) P Haarhuis	6	6
Q	(United States) J Gimelstob	4	3
(Australia) S Draper	6	2	1
12	(United States) C Woodruff	4	6	6
13	(Sweden) J Björkman	6	6
(Australia) R Fromberg	4	3
(Argentina) J Frana	7^{10}	6
4	(United States) M Washington	6^{8}	3

Third round
5	(Netherlands) P Haarhuis	6	6
12	(United States) C Woodruff	4	4
13	(Sweden) J Björkman	6	6
(Argentina) J Frana	0	4

Quarterfinals
5	(Netherlands) P Haarhuis	3	4
13	(Sweden) J Björkman	6	6

==== Section 4 ====
First round
(Canada) S Lareau	2	6	7
Q	(Sweden) J Hede	6	3	5
(Spain) T Carbonell	5	6	3
(Sweden) M Norman	7	3	6
(United States) J Tarango	6	6
(Spain) G Blanco	2	3
(Zimbabwe) B Black	2	7^{7}	6^{4}
(Brazil) G Kuerten	6	6^{5}	7^{7}

Second round
8	(Australia) T Woodbridge	6	7^{7}
(Canada) S Lareau	4	6^{4}
(Sweden) M Norman	6	7
10	(Australia) M Philippoussis	4	5
16	(United States) V Spadea	3	4
(United States) J Tarango	6	6
(Brazil) G Kuerten	6	6
WC/2	(United States) A Agassi	2	4

Third round
8	(Australia) T Woodbridge	7	6
(Sweden) M Norman	5	3
(United States) J Tarango	7^{7}	7^{7}
(Brazil) G Kuerten	6^{5}	6^{5}

Quarterfinals
8	(Australia) T Woodbridge	6	6
(United States) J Tarango	3	1
