= 1996 Kroger St. Jude International – Singles =

Singles
- 1996 Kroger St. Jude International

Final
- Champion: (United States) Pete Sampras
- Runner-up: (United States) Todd Martin
- Score: 6–4, 7–6^{(7–2)}

Details
- Draw: 48
- Seeds: 16

Events
| Singles | Doubles |
| ← 1995 · | U.S. National Indoor Championships | · 1997 → |

Fifth-seeded Todd Martin was the defending champion but lost in the final 6–4, 7–6^{(7–2)} against first-seeded Pete Sampras.

== Seeds ==
All sixteen seeds received a bye to the second round.

1. (United States) Pete Sampras (champion)
2. (United States) Andre Agassi (second round)
3. (United States) Michael Chang (semifinals)
4. (Sweden) Thomas Enqvist (quarterfinals)
5. (United States) Todd Martin (final)
6. (United States) MaliVai Washington (quarterfinals)
7. (Netherlands) Paul Haarhuis (third round)
8. (Chile) Marcelo Ríos (third round)
9. (Australia) Mark Woodforde (quarterfinals)
10. (Australia) Mark Philippoussis (semifinals)
11. (Australia) Todd Woodbridge (third round)
12. (Zimbabwe) Byron Black (third round)
13. (New Zealand) Brett Steven (third round)
14. (Spain) Carlos Costa (third round)
15. (Czech Republic) Jiří Novák (quarterfinals)
16. (United Kingdom) Greg Rusedski (third round)

== Draw ==
=== Key ===
- Q = Qualifier
- WC = Wild card
- LL = Lucky loser
- Alt = Alternate
- ITF = ITF entry
- PR = Protected ranking
- SR = Special ranking
- SE = Special exempt
- JE = Junior exempt
- JR = Junior Accelerator Programme entrant
- CO = College Accelerator Programme entrant
- NG = Next Gen Accelerator Program entrant
- w/o = Walkover
- r = Retired
- d = Defaulted

=== Finals ===
Semifinals
1 | (United States) Pete Sampras | 6 | 6
3 | (United States) Michael Chang | 3 | 2
5 | (United States) Todd Martin | 6 | 7
10 | (Australia) Mark Philippoussis | 3 | 5

Final
1 | (United States) Pete Sampras | 6 | 7^{7}
5 | (United States) Todd Martin | 4 | 6^{2}

=== Top half ===
==== Section 1 ====
First round
(United States) R Reneberg | 6 | 6
(Czech Republic) D Rikl | 1 | 2
(Australia) M Tebbutt | 6 | 6
(Morocco) K Alami | 3 | 3
(Australia) R Fromberg | 6 | 6
Q | (United States) M Washington | 1 | 4
(Spain) T Carbonell | 3 | 5
(Australia) J Stoltenberg | 6 | 7

Second round
1 | (United States) P Sampras | 6 | 7^{7}
(United States) R Reneberg | 3 | 6^{4}
(Australia) M Tebbutt | 7^{7} | 6^{4} | 5
16 | (United Kingdom) G Rusedski | 6^{4} | 7^{7} | 7
9 | (Australia) M Woodforde | 6 | 6
(Australia) R Fromberg | 3 | 2
(Australia) J Stoltenberg | 3 | 3
WC/8 | (Chile) M Ríos | 6 | 6

Third round
1 | (United States) P Sampras | 7^{9} | 7^{7}
16 | (United Kingdom) G Rusedski | 6^{7} | 6^{1}
9 | (Australia) M Woodforde | 6 | 6
WC/8 | (Chile) M Ríos | 2 | 4

Quarterfinals
1 | (United States) P Sampras | 6 | 7^{9}
9 | (Australia) M Woodforde | 4 | 6^{7}

==== Section 2 ====
First round
(Australia) S Draper | 7^{7} | 6
(Argentina) H Gumy | 6^{5} | 2
Q | (United States) C Woodruff | 3 | 6 | 6^{5}
(Spain) C Moyá | 6 | 3 | 7^{7}
(Portugal) N Marques | 6 | 6
(Spain) E Sánchez | 4 | 4
(United States) D Wheaton | 4 | 4
(Slovakia) J Krošlák | 6 | 6

Second round
3 | (United States) M Chang | 6 | 5 | 6
(Australia) S Draper | 3 | 7 | 2
(Spain) C Moyá | 5 | 2
14 | (Spain) C Costa | 7 | 6
12 | (Zimbabwe) B Black | 6 | 6
(Portugal) N Marques | 3 | 4
(Slovakia) J Krošlák | 6^{4} | 3
6 | (United States) MV Washington | 7^{7} | 6

Third round
3 | (United States) M Chang | 6 | 6
14 | (Spain) C Costa | 3 | 4
12 | (Zimbabwe) B Black | 3 | 1
6 | (United States) MV Washington | 6 | 6

Quarterfinals
3 | (United States) M Chang | 7 | 4 | 6
6 | (United States) MV Washington | 5 | 6 | 3

=== Bottom half ===
==== Section 3 ====
First round
WC | (Sweden) M Tillström | 6 | 3 | 7
(Venezuela) N Pereira | 1 | 6 | 5
Q | (South Africa) G Stafford | 3 | 6 | 6
(Brazil) F Meligeni | 6 | 4 | 4
(France) L Roux | 6 | 6^{5} | 6
Q | (Ecuador) N Lapentti | 1 | 7^{7} | 4
Q | (United States) K Evans | 7^{7} | 7^{7}
WC | (United States) B MacPhie | 6^{5} | 6^{5}

Second round
5 | (United States) T Martin | 6 | 7^{7}
WC | (Sweden) M Tillström | 1 | 6^{3}
Q | (South Africa) G Stafford | 4 | 7^{7} | 1
11 | (Australia) T Woodbridge | 6 | 6^{2} | 6
13 | (New Zealand) B Steven | 6 | 5 | 6
(France) L Roux | 3 | 7 | 4
Q | (United States) K Evans | 6^{3} | 6 | 6^{10}
4 | (Sweden) T Enqvist | 7^{7} | 3 | 7^{12}

Third round
5 | (United States) T Martin | 6 | 6
11 | (Australia) T Woodbridge | 3 | 2
13 | (New Zealand) B Steven | 5 | 6 | 2
4 | (Sweden) T Enqvist | 7 | 3 | 6

Quarterfinals
5 | (United States) T Martin | 6 | 6
4 | (Sweden) T Enqvist | 4 | 4

==== Section 4 ====
First round
(United States) J Tarango | 6 | 2
(Germany) C-U Steeb | 3 | 1^{r}
(United States) C Adams | 7^{7} | 4 | 6
(United States) V Spadea | 6^{4} | 6 | 3
(United States) J Stark | 4 | 6 | 6^{2}
Q | (United States) J Grabb | 6 | 3 | 7^{7}
WC | (United States) L Jensen | 6 | 7^{7}
(Japan) S Matsuoka | 3 | 6^{4}

Second round
7 | (Netherlands) P Haarhuis | 6 | 5 | 6
(United States) J Tarango | 2 | 7 | 4
(United States) C Adams | 5 | 2
10 | (Australia) M Philippoussis | 7 | 6
15 | (Czech Republic) J Novák | 7^{7} | 4 | 6
Q | (United States) J Grabb | 6^{5} | 6 | 1
WC | (United States) L Jensen | 6 | 6
2 | (United States) A Agassi | 2 | 4

Third round
7 | (Netherlands) P Haarhuis | 3 | 2
10 | (Australia) M Philippoussis | 6 | 6
15 | (Czech Republic) J Novák | 6 | 6
WC | (United States) L Jensen | 4 | 4

Quarterfinals
10 | (Australia) M Philippoussis | 6 | 6
15 | (Czech Republic) J Novák | 3 | 1
