= 1996 Kroger St. Jude International =

- Date: February 19–25
- Edition: 26th
- Category: Championship Series
- Draw: 48S / 24D
- Prize money: $683,000
- Surface: Hard / indoor
- Location: Memphis, Tennessee, U.S.
- Venue: Racquet Club of Memphis

Champions

Singles
- (United States) Pete Sampras

Doubles
- (The Bahamas) Mark Knowles / (Canada) Daniel Nestor
- U.S. National Indoor Championships

The 1996 Kroger St. Jude International was a men's tennis tournament played on indoor hard courts at the Racquet Club of Memphis in Memphis, Tennessee in the United States and was part of the Championship Series of the 1996 ATP Tour. It was the 26th edition of the edition of the tournament and ran from February 19 through February 25, 1996. First-seeded Pete Sampras won the singles title.

== Finals ==
=== Singles ===
(United States) Pete Sampras defeated (United States) Todd Martin 6–4, 7–6^{(7–2)}

- It was Sampras' 2nd singles title of the year and the 38th of his career.

=== Doubles ===
(The Bahamas) Mark Knowles / (Canada) Daniel Nestor defeated (Australia) Todd Woodbridge / (Australia) Mark Woodforde 7–6, 1–6, 6–4

- It was Knowles' 4th title of the year and the 21st of his career. It was Nestor's 1st title of the year and the 25th of his career.
