= 1995 Kroger St. Jude International =

- Date: February 13–19
- Edition: 25th
- Category: Championship Series
- Draw: 64S / 32D
- Prize money: $683,000
- Surface: Hard / indoor
- Location: Memphis, TN, United States
- Venue: Racquet Club of Memphis

Champions

Singles
- (United States) Todd Martin

Doubles
- (United States) Jared Palmer / (United States) Richey Reneberg
- U.S. National Indoor Championships

The 1995 Kroger St. Jude International is a men's ATP tennis tournament held in Memphis, Tennessee, United States. The event was part of the Championship Series of the 1995 ATP Tour. It was the 25th edition of the tournament and was played on indoor hard courts and was held from February 13 through February 19, 1995.

Todd Martin won his 1st title of the year, and 4th of his career. It was his second win at Memphis, also winning in 1994.

== Finals ==
=== Singles ===
(United States) Todd Martin defeated (Netherlands) Paul Haarhuis 7–6^{(7–2)}, 6–4

=== Doubles ===
(United States) Jared Palmer / (United States) Richey Reneberg defeated (United States) Tommy Ho / (New Zealand) Brett Steven 4–6, 7–6, 6–1
