= 1999 Kroger St. Jude International – Singles =

Singles
- 1999 Kroger St. Jude International

Final
- Champion: (Germany) Tommy Haas
- Runner-up: (United States) Jim Courier
- Score: 6–4, 6–1

Details
- Draw: 48
- Seeds: 16

Events
Singles	Doubles
← 1998 ·	U.S. National Indoor Championships	· 2000 →

The 1999 Kroger St. Jude International was a men's tennis tournament played on indoor Hard courts in Memphis, United States, that was part of the Championship Series of the 1999 ATP Tour. It was the twenty-ninth edition of the tournament and was held 15 February – 21 February.

== Seeds ==
Champion seeds are indicated in bold text while text in italics indicates the round in which those seeds were eliminated.

1. (United States) Todd Martin (semifinals)
2. (Australia) Mark Philippoussis (third round)
3. (Germany) **Tommy Haas (champion)**
4. (United States) Michael Chang (second round)
5. Unknown (withdrew)
6. (Argentina) Mariano Puerta (quarterfinals)
7. (United States) Jan-Michael Gambill (quarterfinals)
8. (Czech Republic) Daniel Vacek (second round)
9. (Australia) Scott Draper (third round)
10. (Argentina) Mariano Zabaleta (second round)
11. (United States) Jeff Tarango (second round)
12. (Australia) Andrew Ilie (quarterfinals)
13. (Paraguay) Ramón Delgado (third round)
14. (Brazil) Fernando Meligeni (second round)
15. (Australia) Mark Woodforde (second round)
16. (Argentina) Franco Squillari (second round)

== Draw ==
=== Key ===
- Q = Qualifier
- WC = Wild card
- LL = Lucky loser
- Alt = Alternate
- ITF = ITF entry
- PR = Protected ranking
- SR = Special ranking
- SE = Special exempt
- JE = Junior exempt
- JR = Junior Accelerator Programme entrant
- CO = College Accelerator Programme entrant
- NG = Next Gen Accelerator Program entrant
- w/o = Walkover
- r = Retired
- d = Defaulted

=== Finals ===
Semifinals
1	(United States) Todd Martin	3	6
3	**(Germany) Tommy Haas**	**6**	**7**
**(United States) Jim Courier**	**7**	3	**6**
(Netherlands) John van Lottum	6	**6**	4

Final
3	**(Germany) Tommy Haas**	**6**	**6**
(United States) Jim Courier	4	1

=== Top half ===
==== Section 1 ====
First round
**(United States) J Stark**	**6**	**6**
(New Zealand) B Steven	2	3
**(Denmark) K Carlsen**	**6**	**6**
(United States) S Campbell	1	0
**(Spain) A Portas**	**7**	3	**6**
(Armenia) S Sargsian	6	**6**	3
**(Spain) Á Calatrava**	5	**7**	**6**
(United States) M Joyce	**7**	6	4

Second round
1	**(United States) T Martin**	**7**	4	**7**
(United States) J Stark	6	**6**	5
**(Denmark) K Carlsen**	**6**	**6**
16	(Argentina) F Squillari	1	2
9	**(Australia) S Draper**	**6**	**7**
(Spain) A Portas	3	5
(Spain) Á Calatrava	4	2
7	**(United States) J-M Gambill**	**6**	**6**

Third round
1	**(United States) T Martin**	**7**	**6**
(Denmark) K Carlsen	6	2
9	(Australia) S Draper	3	6
7	**(United States) J-M Gambill**	**6**	**7**

Quarterfinals
1	**(United States) T Martin**	3	**7**	**7**
7	(United States) J-M Gambill	**6**	5	6

==== Section 2 ====
First round
**(United States) A O'Brien**	**6**	**6**
(South Africa) G Stafford	4	2
**(Japan) T Suzuki**	**6**	**6**
(Romania) D Pescariu	4	4
**(Norway) C Ruud**	**6**	**6**
(Spain) J Alonso	2	4
**(Czech Republic) J Novák**	**7**	6	**6**
(Canada) S Lareau	6	**7**	3

Second round
3	**(Germany) T Haas**	**6**	**6**
(United States) A O'Brien	4	4
(Japan) T Suzuki	3	2
13	**(Paraguay) R Delgado**	**6**	**6**
12	**(Australia) A Ilie**	6	**6**	**6**
(Norway) C Ruud	**7**	2	3
**(Czech Republic) J Novák**	6	**6**	**7**
(United States) P Goldstein	**7**	0	5

Third round
3	**(Germany) T Haas**	**7**	**6**
13	(Paraguay) R Delgado	6	2
12	**(Australia) A Ilie**	**6**	4	**6**
(Czech Republic) J Novák	4	**6**	4

Quarterfinals
3	**(Germany) T Haas**	**7**	3	**6**
12	(Australia) A Ilie	5	**6**	3

=== Bottom half ===
==== Section 3 ====
First round
**(Australia) M Hill**	**7**	4	**7**
(Spain) JA Viloca	6	**6**	5
**(United States) R Reneberg**	**7**	**6**
(Spain) G Blanco	6	3
**(Italy) L Tieleman**	**7**	**6**
(Argentina) M Rodríguez	6	2
**(United States) J Courier**	**6**	**6**
(United States) G Grant	0	3

Second round
6	**(Argentina) M Puerta**	**6**	**6**
(Australia) M Hill	4	1
**(United States) R Reneberg**	**6**	**6**
11	(United States) J Tarango	2	2
14	(Brazil) F Meligeni	4	3
**(Italy) L Tieleman**	**6**	**6**
**(United States) J Courier**	**6**	**7**
4	(United States) M Chang	4	6

Third round
6	**(Argentina) M Puerta**	4	**6**	**6**
(United States) R Reneberg	**6**	3	4
(Italy) L Tieleman	**7**	5	1
**(United States) J Courier**	6	**7**	**6**

Quarterfinals
6	(Argentina) M Puerta	0	2
**(United States) J Courier**	**6**	**6**

==== Section 4 ====
First round
**(Australia) T Woodbridge**	**6**	**7**
(Spain) C Costa	4	5
**(Netherlands) J van Lottum**	**6**	**6**
(Argentina) G Cañas	2	2
**(Canada) D Nestor**	**6**	**6**
(United States) J Gimelstob	4	3
**(United States) C Woodruff**	**6**	**7**
(Austria) S Koubek	4	6

Second round
8	(Czech Republic) D Vacek	4	0
**(Australia) T Woodbridge**	**6**	**6**
**(Netherlands) J van Lottum**	**6**	**6**
10	(Argentina) M Zabaleta	1	3
15	(Australia) M Woodforde	6	4
**(Canada) D Nestor**	**7**	**6**
(United States) C Woodruff	3	6
2	**(Australia) M Philippoussis**	**6**	**7**

Third round
(Australia) T Woodbridge	4	4
**(Netherlands) J van Lottum**	**6**	**6**
**(Canada) D Nestor**	1	**6**	**7**
2	(Australia) M Philippoussis	**6**	3	6

Quarterfinals
**(Netherlands) J van Lottum**	3	**7**	**6**
(Canada) D Nestor	**6**	6	4
