= 1998 Waldbaum's Hamlet Cup – Doubles =

Doubles
- 1998 Waldbaum's Hamlet Cup

Final
- Champions: (Spain) Julián Alonso (Spain) Javier Sánchez
- Runners-up: (United States) Brandon Coupe (United States) Dave Randall
- Score: 6–4, 6–4

Events
Singles	men	women
Doubles	men	women
← 1997 ·	Waldbaum's Hamlet Cup	· 1999 →

The 1998 Waldbaum's Hamlet Cup was a men's tennis tournament played on Hard courts in Long Island, United that was part of the International Series of the 1998 ATP Tour. It was the eighteenth edition of the tournament and was held from 24 to 30 August 1998.

== Seeds ==
Champion seeds are indicated in bold text while text in italics indicates the round in which those seeds were eliminated.

1. (South Africa) David Adams / (New Zealand) Brett Steven (semifinals)
2. (Spain) **Julián Alonso** / (Spain) **Javier Sánchez (champions)**
3. (South Africa) Robbie Koenig / (Germany) David Prinosil (first round)
4. (North Macedonia) Aleksandar Kitinov / (Mexico) David Roditi (first round)

== Draw ==
=== Key ===
- Q = Qualifier
- WC = Wild card
- LL = Lucky loser
- Alt = Alternate
- SE = Special exempt
- PR = Protected ranking
- ITF = ITF entry
- JE = Junior exempt
- w/o = Walkover
- r = Retired
- d = Defaulted
- SR = Special ranking

=== Finals ===
First round
1	(South Africa) **D Adams** **(New Zealand) B Steven**	**7**	**6**
(Netherlands) S Groen (Netherlands) M Oosting	6	4
(United States) **D Bowen** **(Czech Republic) T Anzari**	**7**	4	**6**
(Argentina) D del Río (Australia) J Holmes	6	**6**	3
(United States) **B Coupe** **(United States) D Randall**	**7**	**6**
4	(North Macedonia) A Kitinov (Mexico) D Roditi	6	4
(Netherlands) **S Noteboom** **(Netherlands) F Wibier**	**6**	**6**
(Spain) A Berasategui (Spain) À Corretja	2	1
(United States) **E Taino** **(United States) G Van Emburgh**	**6**	**7**
(Spain) JA Conde (Socialist Federal Republic of Yugoslavia) N Djordjevic	3	6
(United States) **L Jensen** **(United States) M Jensen**	2	**6**	**7**
3	(South Africa) R Koenig (Germany) D Prinosil	**6**	4	6
(Brazil) **F Meligeni** **(Argentina) M Puerta**	**6**	**6**
(United States) J Hausman (United States) T Meringoff	2	4
2	(Spain) **J Alonso** **(Spain) J Sánchez**	**6**	**7**
(Australia) G Silcock (South Africa) M Wakefield	4	5

Quarterfinals
1	(South Africa) **D Adams** **(New Zealand) B Steven**	**6**	**6**
(United States) D Bowen (Czech Republic) T Anzari	3	0
(United States) **B Coupe** **(United States) D Randall**	**6**	6	**6**
(Netherlands) S Noteboom (Netherlands) F Wibier	4	**7**	4
(United States) E Taino (United States) G Van Emburgh	**6**	3	6
(United States) **L Jensen** **(United States) M Jensen**	4	**6**	**7**
(Brazil) F Meligeni (Argentina) M Puerta	**6**	5	3
2	(Spain) **J Alonso** **(Spain) J Sánchez**	3	**7**	**6**

Semifinals
1	(South Africa) D Adams (New Zealand) B Steven	4	4
(United States) **B Coupe** **(United States) D Randall**	**6**	**6**
(United States) L Jensen (United States) M Jensen	4	4
2	(Spain) **J Alonso** **(Spain) J Sánchez**	**6**	**6**

Final
(United States) B Coupe (United States) D Randall	4	4
2	(Spain) **J Alonso** **(Spain) J Sánchez**	**6**	**6**
