= 1997 Kroger St. Jude International – Doubles =

Doubles
- 1997 Kroger St. Jude International
- 1996 Champions: (The Bahamas) Mark Knowles (Canada) Daniel Nestor

Final
- Champions: (South Africa) Ellis Ferreira (United States) Patrick Galbraith
- Runners-up: (United States) Rick Leach (United States) Jonathan Stark
- Score: 6–3, 3–6, 6–1

Details
- Draw: 24
- Seeds: 8

Events
Singles	Doubles
← 1996 ·	U.S. National Indoor Championships	· 1998 →

Mark Knowles and Daniel Nestor were the defending champions but lost in the quarterfinals to Ellis Ferreira and Patrick Galbraith.

Ferreira and Galbraith won in the final 6–3, 3–6, 6–1 against Rick Leach and Jonathan Stark.

== Seeds ==
Champion seeds are indicated in bold text while text in italics indicates the round in which those seeds were eliminated. All eight seeded teams received byes to the second round.

1. (Australia) Todd Woodbridge / (Australia) Mark Woodforde (semifinals)
2. (Zimbabwe) Byron Black / (Canada) Grant Connell (quarterfinals)
3. (Netherlands) Jacco Eltingh / (Netherlands) Paul Haarhuis (quarterfinals)
4. (South Africa) **Ellis Ferreira** / (United States) **Patrick Galbraith (champions)**
5. (The Bahamas) Mark Knowles / (Canada) Daniel Nestor (quarterfinals)
6. (Canada) Sébastien Lareau / (United States) Alex O'Brien (second round)
7. (United States) Rick Leach / (United States) Jonathan Stark (final)
8. (United States) Jim Grabb / (United States) Richey Reneberg (quarterfinals)

== Draw ==
=== Key ===
- Q = Qualifier
- WC = Wild card
- LL = Lucky loser
- Alt = Alternate
- ITF = ITF entry
- PR = Protected ranking
- SR = Special ranking
- SE = Special exempt
- JE = Junior exempt
- JR = Junior Accelerator Programme entrant
- CO = College Accelerator Programme entrant
- NG = Next Gen Accelerator Program entrant
- w/o = Walkover
- r = Retired
- d = Defaulted

=== Final ===
Final

4
- (South Africa) **Ellis Ferreira**
- (United States) **Patrick Galbraith**
**6**
3
**6**

7
- (United States) Rick Leach
- (United States) Jonathan Stark
3
**6**
1

=== Top half ===
First round

Second round

Quarterfinals

Semifinals

1
- (Australia) **T Woodbridge**
- (Australia) **M Woodforde**
**7**
**6**

- (South Africa) **B Haygarth**
- (Netherlands) **S Schalken**
**7**
**7**

- (South Africa) B Haygarth
- (Netherlands) S Schalken
6
2

- (Spain) T Carbonell
- (Spain) F Roig
6
6

1
- (Australia) **T Woodbridge**
- (Australia) **M Woodforde**
3
**6**
**7**

- (Sweden) **J Björkman**
- (United States) **D Flach**
**7**
6
**6**

8
- (United States) J Grabb
- (United States) R Reneberg
**6**
4
6

WC
- (United States) M Joyce
- (United States) D Pate
6
**7**
4

- (Sweden) J Björkman
- (United States) D Flach
4
4

8
- (United States) **J Grabb**
- (United States) **R Reneberg**
**6**
**6**

1
- (Australia) T Woodbridge
- (Australia) M Woodforde
6
4

4
- (South Africa) **E Ferreira**
- (United States) **P Galbraith**
**7**
**6**

4
- (South Africa) **E Ferreira**
- (United States) **P Galbraith**
**6**
6
**6**

- (United States) **K Kinnear**
- (United States) **D Randall**
**6**
**7**

- (United States) K Kinnear
- (United States) D Randall
4
**7**
4

WC
- (United States) L Jensen
- (United States) M Jensen
4
6

4
- (South Africa) **E Ferreira**
- (United States) **P Galbraith**
6
**7**
**7**

- (Australia) **M Philippoussis**
- (Australia) **P Rafter**
**6**
**6**

5
- (The Bahamas) M Knowles
- (Canada) D Nestor
**7**
6
5

- (United States) B MacPhie
- (South Africa) G Muller
3
4

- (Australia) M Philippoussis
- (Australia) P Rafter
6
3

5
- (The Bahamas) **M Knowles**
- (Canada) **D Nestor**
**7**
**6**

=== Bottom half ===
First round

Second round

Quarterfinals

Semifinals

6
- (Canada) S Lareau
- (United States) A O'Brien
**6**
3
4

Q
- (United States) **J Gimelstob**
- (New Zealand) **B Steven**
**6**
**6**

Q
- (United States) **J Gimelstob**
- (New Zealand) **B Steven**
3
**6**
**6**

- (United States) P McEnroe
- (United States) C Woodruff
2
3

Q
- (United States) **J Gimelstob**
- (New Zealand) **B Steven**
**6**
4
**6**

WC
- (United States) B Gilbert
- (Armenia) S Sargsian
6
2

3
- (Netherlands) J Eltingh
- (Netherlands) P Haarhuis
3
**6**
3

- (United States) **T Kronemann**
- (Australia) **D Macpherson**
**7**
**6**

- (United States) T Kronemann
- (Australia) D Macpherson
3
4

3
- (Netherlands) **J Eltingh**
- (Netherlands) **P Haarhuis**
**6**
**6**

Q
- (United States) J Gimelstob
- (New Zealand) B Steven
6
**7**
1

7
- (United States) **R Leach**
- (United States) **J Stark**
**7**
6
**6**

7
- (United States) **R Leach**
- (United States) **J Stark**
**6**
**6**

- (France) J-P Fleurian
- (France) G Raoux
6
**6**
2

- (South Africa) C van Rensburg
- (United States) J Waite
2
3

- (South Africa) **C van Rensburg**
- (United States) **J Waite**
**7**
3
**6**

7
- (United States) **R Leach**
- (United States) **J Stark**
**7**
**7**

WC
- (United States) B Shelton
- (United States) M Washington
4
2

2
- (Zimbabwe) B Black
- (Canada) G Connell
6
6

- (Argentina) **J Frana**
- (Argentina) **L Lobo**
**6**
**6**

- (Argentina) J Frana
- (Argentina) L Lobo
3
4

2
- (Zimbabwe) **B Black**
- (Canada) **G Connell**
**6**
**6**
