= 1996 Kroger St. Jude International – Doubles =

Doubles
- 1996 Kroger St. Jude International

Final
- Champions: (The Bahamas) Mark Knowles (Canada) Daniel Nestor
- Runners-up: (Australia) Todd Woodbridge (Australia) Mark Woodforde
- Score: 7–6, 1–6, 6–4

Details
- Draw: 24
- Seeds: 8

Events
| Singles | Doubles |
| ← 1995 · | U.S. National Indoor Championships | · 1997 → |

Jared Palmer and Richey Reneberg were the defending champions but only Reneberg competed that year with Jim Grabb.

Grabb and Reneberg lost in the first round to Brian MacPhie and Mark Philippoussis.

Mark Knowles and Daniel Nestor won in the final 7–6, 1–6, 6–4 against Todd Woodbridge and Mark Woodforde.

== Seeds ==
Champion seeds are indicated in bold text while text in italics indicates the round in which those seeds were eliminated. All eight seeded teams received byes to the second round.

1. (Australia) Todd Woodbridge / (Australia) Mark Woodforde (final)
2. (The Bahamas) **Mark Knowles** / (Canada) **Daniel Nestor (champions)**
3. (Zimbabwe) Byron Black / (Canada) Grant Connell (quarterfinals)
4. (United States) Rick Leach / (United States) Scott Melville (quarterfinals)
5. (Netherlands) Paul Haarhuis / (Spain) Emilio Sánchez (second round)
6. (United States) Todd Martin / (United States) Alex O'Brien (semifinals)
7. (United States) Mark Keil / (United States) Jeff Tarango (second round)
8. (Spain) Tomás Carbonell / (Spain) Francisco Roig (quarterfinals)

== Draw ==
=== Key ===
- Q = Qualifier
- WC = Wild card
- LL = Lucky loser
- Alt = Alternate
- ITF = ITF entry
- PR = Protected ranking
- SR = Special ranking
- SE = Special exempt
- JE = Junior exempt
- JR = Junior Accelerator Programme entrant
- CO = College Accelerator Programme entrant
- NG = Next Gen Accelerator Program entrant
- w/o = Walkover
- r = Retired
- d = Defaulted

=== Final ===
Final

1
- (Australia) Todd Woodbridge
- (Australia) Mark Woodforde
6
**6**
4

2
- (The Bahamas) **Mark Knowles**
- (Canada) **Daniel Nestor**
**7**
1
**6**

=== Top half ===
First round

Second round

Quarterfinals

Semifinals

1
- (Australia) **T Woodbridge**
- (Australia) **M Woodforde**
**6**
**6**

- (United States) **K Kinnear**
- (United States) **D Randall**
4
**6**
**6**

- (United States) K Kinnear
- (United States) D Randall
3
3

WC
- (India) M Bhupathi
- (Lebanon) A Hamadeh
**6**
2
3

1
- (Australia) **T Woodbridge**
- (Australia) **M Woodforde**
**6**
3
**7**

- (Spain) J A Conde
- (Portugal) N Marques
4
**7**
1

WC
- (United States) K Flach
- (United States) K Jones
3
**6**
5

WC
- (United States) **K Flach**
- (United States) **K Jones**
**6**
6
**6**

WC
- (United States) **K Flach**
- (United States) **K Jones**
**6**
**7**

7
- (United States) M Keil
- (United States) J Tarango
3
6

1
- (Australia) **T Woodbridge**
- (Australia) **M Woodforde**
**6**
4
**6**

WC
- (United States) M Joyce
- (United States) D Pate
2
**6**
1

4
- (United States) **R Leach**
- (United States) **S Melville**
**6**
4
**7**

- (United States) J Grabb
- (United States) R Reneberg
0
**6**
1

- (United States) B MacPhie
- (Australia) M Philippoussis
3
**6**
5

- (United States) **B MacPhie**
- (Australia) **M Philippoussis**
**6**
4
**6**

4
- (United States) R Leach
- (United States) S Melville
2
3

- (Netherlands) T Nijssen
- (United States) G Van Emburgh
2
4

WC
- (United States) **M Joyce**
- (United States) **D Pate**
**6**
**6**

WC
- (United States) **M Joyce**
- (United States) **D Pate**
**6**
**6**

WC
- (United States) **M Joyce**
- (United States) **D Pate**
**6**
**7**

5
- (Netherlands) P Haarhuis
- (Spain) E Sánchez
3
5

=== Bottom half ===
First round

Second round

Quarterfinals

Semifinals

6
- (United States) **T Martin**
- (United States) **A O'Brien**
**6**
**6**

- (United States) T Kronemann
- (Australia) D Macpherson
4
6

- (Czech Republic) J Novák
- (Czech Republic) D Rikl
3
4

- (Czech Republic) **J Novák**
- (Czech Republic) **D Rikl**
**6**
**7**

6
- (United States) **T Martin**
- (United States) **A O'Brien**
3
**7**
**6**

Q
- (United Kingdom) G Rusedski
- (Australia) P Tramacchi
4
3

3
- (Zimbabwe) B Black
- (Canada) G Connell
**6**
6
4

- (Venezuela) **N Pereira**
- (Australia) **M Tebbutt**
**6**
**6**

- (Venezuela) N Pereira
- (Australia) M Tebbutt
1
**7**
5

3
- (Zimbabwe) **B Black**
- (Canada) **G Connell**
**6**
5
**7**

6
- (United States) T Martin
- (United States) A O'Brien
6
4

2
- (The Bahamas) **M Knowles**
- (Canada) **D Nestor**
**7**
**6**

8
- (Spain) **T Carbonell**
- (Spain) **F Roig**
**7**
1
**6**

- (United States) **L Jensen**
- (United States) **M Jensen**
5
**6**
**6**

- (United States) L Jensen
- (United States) M Jensen
6
**6**
4

- (Australia) J Eagle
- (Australia) A Florent
**7**
4
3

8
- (Spain) T Carbonell
- (Spain) F Roig
5
3

WC
- (United States) B Shelton
- (United States) K Thorne
**7**
1
4

2
- (The Bahamas) **M Knowles**
- (Canada) **D Nestor**
**7**
**6**

- (United States) **M Lucena**
- (United States) **J Waite**
6
**6**
**6**

- (United States) M Lucena
- (United States) J Waite
**6**
3
2

2
- (The Bahamas) **M Knowles**
- (Canada) **D Nestor**
4
**6**
**6**
