= 1997 Waldbaum's Hamlet Cup =

- Date: August 18–24
- Edition: 17th
- Category: International Series
- Draw: 32S / 16D
- Surface: Hard / outdoor
- Location: Long Island, United States

Champions

Singles
- (Spain) Carlos Moyá

Doubles
- (South Africa) Marcos Ondruska / (Germany) David Prinosil
- Waldbaum's Hamlet Cup

The 1997 Waldbaum's Hamlet Cup was a men's tennis tournament played on hard courts in Long Island, United States that was part of the International Series of the 1997 ATP Tour. It was the seventeenth edition of the tournament and was held from 18 to 24 August 1997. Fifth-seeded Carlos Moyá won the singles title.

== Finals ==
=== Singles ===
(Spain) Carlos Moyá defeated (Australia) Patrick Rafter, 6–4, 7–6^{(7–1)}

=== Doubles ===
(South Africa) Marcos Ondruska / (Germany) David Prinosil defeated (United States) Mark Keil / (United States) T. J. Middleton, 6–4, 6–4
