= 1999 Kroger St. Jude International =

- Date: February 15–21
- Edition: 29th
- Category: ATP Championship Series
- Draw: 48S / 24D
- Prize money: $700,000
- Surface: Hard / indoor
- Location: Memphis, United States

Champions

Singles
- (Germany) Tommy Haas

Doubles
- (Australia) Todd Woodbridge / (Australia) Mark Woodforde
- U.S. National Indoor Championships

The 1999 Kroger St. Jude International was a men's tennis tournament played on indoor hard courts in Memphis, United States, that was part of the Championship Series of the 1999 ATP Tour. It was the twenty-ninth edition of the tournament and was held from 15 February through 21 February. Third-seeded Tommy Haas won the singles title.

== Finals ==
=== Singles ===
(Germany) Tommy Haas defeated (United States) Jim Courier, 6–4, 6–1

- It was Haas' first singles title of his career.

=== Doubles ===
(Australia) Todd Woodbridge / (Australia) Mark Woodforde defeated (Canada) Sébastien Lareau / (United States) Alex O'Brien, 6–3, 6–4
