= 1997 Kroger St. Jude International =

- Date: February 17–23
- Edition: 27th
- Category: Championship Series
- Draw: 48S / 24D
- Prize money: $700,000
- Surface: Hard / indoor
- Location: Memphis, Tennessee, U.S.
- Venue: Racquet Club of Memphis

Champions

Singles
- (United States) Michael Chang

Doubles
- (South Africa) Ellis Ferreira / (United States) Patrick Galbraith
- U.S. National Indoor Championships

The 1997 Kroger St. Jude International was a men's tennis tournament played on indoor hard courts at the Racquet Club of Memphis in Memphis, Tennessee in the United States and was part of the Championship Series of the 1997 ATP Tour. The tournament ran from February 17 through February 23, 1997. First-seeded Michael Chang won the singles title.

== Finals ==
=== Singles ===
(United States) Michael Chang defeated (Australia) Todd Woodbridge 6–3, 6–4

- It was Chang's 1st title of the year and the 27th of his career.

=== Doubles ===
(South Africa) Ellis Ferreira / (United States) Patrick Galbraith defeated (United States) Rick Leach / (United States) Jonathan Stark 6–3, 3–6, 6–1

- It was Ferreira's 2nd title of the year and the 5th of his career. It was Galbraith's 2nd title of the year and the 31st of his career.
