= 1999 Waldbaum's Hamlet Cup =

- Date: August 23–29
- Edition: 19th
- Category: International Series
- Surface: Hard / outdoor
- Location: Long Island, United States

Champions

Singles
- (Sweden) Magnus Norman

Doubles
- (France) Olivier Delaître / (France) Fabrice Santoro
← 1998 ·	Waldbaum's Hamlet Cup	· 2000 →

The 1999 Waldbaum's Hamlet Cup was a men's tennis tournament played on Hard courts in Long Island, United that was part of the International Series of the 1998 ATP Tour. It was the nineteenth edition of the tournament and was held from 23–29 August 1999.

== Finals ==
=== Singles ===
(Sweden) Magnus Norman defeated (Spain) Àlex Corretja, 7–6^{(7–4)}, 4–6, 6–3

=== Doubles ===
(France) Olivier Delaître / (France) Fabrice Santoro defeated (United States) Jan-Michael Gambill / (United States) Scott Humphries, 7–5, 6–4
