= Andrew Rueb =

American tennis player and coach

- Country (sports): United States
- Born: November 18, 1972 (age 54) Washington D.C.
- Prize money: $28,966

Singles
- Highest ranking: No. 378 (September 21, 1998)

Grand Slam singles results
- US Open: Q1 (1998)

Doubles
- Career record: 1–4
- Highest ranking: No. 214 (June 23, 1997)

Grand Slam doubles results
- Wimbledon: 1R (1997)

Andrew Rueb (born November 18, 1972) is an American tennis coach and former professional player. He is the Scott Mead '77 Head Coach for Harvard Men's Tennis, since 2018.

Rueb, who was born in Washington D.C., played collegiate tennis while studying at Harvard University in the early 1990s and was a two-time Ivy League Player of the Year. He was a member of three Ivy League championship winning teams and served as the side's captain in his senior year.

Before becoming a professional player, he had worked for the WTT Boston Lobsters, and helped founders Andy Crane and Ned Eames establish the Tenacity inner-city youth tennis and academic organization.

On the professional tour, Rueb had a best singles world ranking of 378 and featured in the qualifying draw for the 1998 US Open. He played for the men's doubles main draw of the 1997 Wimbledon Championships, with Robbie Koenig, and was a doubles quarter-finalist at the ATP Tour tournament in Long Island in 1999.

Following his professional tennis career he returned to the university and completed a master's degree at Harvard Divinity School. Soon after he joined the Harvard men's tennis team. In 2007, he became assistant head coach of Men's Tennis at Harvard, serving a long apprenticeship under Dave Fish, before being promoted to head coach in 2018.

In 2009, the New York Times published Rueb's essay on sportsmanship, "Wimbledon, Ethics and Tennis" in its tennis column.

== ITF Futures titles ==
=== Singles: (1) ===
No.	Date	Tournament	Surface	Opponent	Score
1.	Jan 1998	India F3, Indore	Hard	(United States) Todd Meringoff	6–3, 6–4

=== Doubles: (9) ===
No.	Date	Tournament	Surface	Partner	Opponents	Score
1.	Jan 1998	India F3, Indore	Hard	(Lebanon) Ali Hamadeh	(Israel) Jonathan Erlich (Israel) Noam Okun	7–6, 6–4
2.	Mar 1998	Japan F1, Ishiwa	Clay	(United States) Todd Meringoff	(New Zealand) James Greenhalgh (Australia) Andrew Painter	6–4, 6–2
3.	Mar 1998	Japan F2, Shirako	Carpet	(United States) Todd Meringoff	(Japan) Yaoki Ishii (Japan) Hiroyasu Sato	6–0, 6–3
4.	Sep 1998	France F6, Mulhouse	Hard	(South Africa) Vaughan Snyman	(United Kingdom) Kyle Spencer (South Africa) Louis Vosloo	6–4, 6–1
5.	Sep 1998	France F7, Plaisir	Hard	(South Africa) Vaughan Snyman	(France) Jean-René Lisnard (France) Michaël Llodra	6–4, 6–2
6.	Oct 1998	Great Britain F10, Edinburgh	Hard	(Australia) Ashley Naumann	(United Kingdom) James Davidson (United Kingdom) David Sherwood	6–3, 6–2
7.	Jan 1999	India F2, Ahmedabad	Hard	(United States) Todd Meringoff	(Canada) Simon Larose (Canada) Jocelyn Robichaud	7–6, 6–3
8.	Mar 1999	Philippines F1, Manila	Hard	(Germany) Marcus Hilpert	(Georgia (country)) Irakli Labadze (Russia) Dmitry Tursunov	6–4, 7–6
9.	Mar 1999	Philippines F2, Manila	Hard	(Germany) Marcus Hilpert	(Uzbekistan) Timur Ganiev (United States) Jesse Walter	7–5, 6–4
