= 1997 Waldbaum's Hamlet Cup – Doubles =

Doubles
- 1997 Waldbaum's Hamlet Cup

Final
- Champions: (South Africa) Marcos Ondruska (Germany) David Prinosil
- Runners-up: (United States) Mark Keil (United States) T.J. Middleton
- Score: 6–4, 6–4

Events
Singles	men	women
Doubles	men	women
← 1996 ·	Waldbaum's Hamlet Cup	· 1998 →

The 1997 Waldbaum's Hamlet Cup was a men's tennis tournament played on Hard courts in Long Island, United that was part of the International Series of the 1997 ATP Tour. It was the seventeenth edition of the tournament and was held from 18–24 August 1998.

== Seeds ==
Champion seeds are indicated in bold text while text in italics indicates the round in which those seeds were eliminated.

1. (Argentina) Luis Lobo / (Spain) Javier Sánchez (first round)
2. (United States) Luke Jensen / (United States) Luke Jensen (first round)
3. (Germany) Marc-Kevin Goellner / (United States) Richey Reneberg (semifinals)
4. (Netherlands) Stephen Noteboom / (Netherlands) Fernon Wibier (first round)

== Draw ==
=== Key ===
- Q = Qualifier
- WC = Wild card
- LL = Lucky loser
- Alt = Alternate
- SE = Special exempt
- PR = Protected ranking
- ITF = ITF entry
- JE = Junior exempt
- w/o = Walkover
- r = Retired
- d = Defaulted
- SR = Special ranking

=== Finals ===
First round
1	(Argentina) L Lobo (Spain) J Sánchez	3	**6**	3
(Uruguay) **M Filippini** **(Sweden) T Johansson**	**6**	4	**6**
(South Africa) **M Ondruska** **(Germany) D Prinosil**	6	**7**	**6**
(Latvia) Ģirts Dzelde (Germany) M Hilpert	**7**	5	4
3	(Germany) **M-K Goellner** **(United States) R Reneberg**	**7**	**6**
(Slovakia) J Krošlák (Slovakia) K Kučera	6	2
(Sweden) **P Nyborg** **(United States) G Van Emburgh**	**6**	**7**
(Romania) D Pescariu (Italy) D Sanguinetti	4	5
(Sweden) **R Bergh** **(Brazil) G Kuerten**	**6**	**6**
(United States) A Roberman (United States) J Schmidt	4	2
(United States) **M Keil** **(United States) TJ Middleton**	**7**	**7**
4	(Netherlands) S Noteboom (Netherlands) F Wibier	5	6
(Australia) **P Kilderry** **(Ecuador) N Lapentti**	**6**	**7**
(United States) V Spadea (United States) E Taino	4	6
(United States) **K Kinnear** **(North Macedonia) A Kitinov**	**7**	**6**
2	(United States) L Jensen (United States) M Jensen	6	3

Quarterfinals
(Uruguay) M Filippini (Sweden) T Johansson	6	5
(South Africa) **M Ondruska** **(Germany) D Prinosil**	**7**	**7**
3	(Germany) **M-K Goellner** **(United States) R Reneberg**	**7**	**6**
(Sweden) P Nyborg (United States) G Van Emburgh	6	4
(Sweden) R Bergh (Brazil) G Kuerten	6	4
(United States) **M Keil** **(United States) TJ Middleton**	**7**	**6**
(Australia) P Kilderry (Ecuador) N Lapentti	4	**6**	6
(United States) **K Kinnear** **(North Macedonia) A Kitinov**	**6**	3	**7**

Semifinals
(South Africa) **M Ondruska** **(Germany) D Prinosil**	**7**	**6**
3	(Germany) M-K Goellner (United States) R Reneberg	5	1
(United States) **M Keil** **(United States) TJ Middleton**	**6**	3	**7**
(United States) K Kinnear (North Macedonia) A Kitinov	4	**6**	5

Final
(South Africa) **M Ondruska** **(Germany) D Prinosil**	**6**	**6**
(United States) M Keil (United States) TJ Middleton	4	4
