= 1994 Kroger St. Jude International =

Tennis tournament

- Date: February 7–13
- Edition: 24th
- Category: Championship Series
- Draw: 64S / 32D
- Prize money: $675,000
- Surface: Hard / indoor
- Location: Memphis, Tennessee, US
- Venue: Racquet Club of Memphis

Champions

Singles
- (United States) Todd Martin

Doubles
- (Zimbabwe) Byron Black / (United States) Jonathan Stark
- U.S. National Indoor Championships

The 1994 Kroger St. Jude International was a men's tennis tournament held in Memphis, Tennessee. The event was part of the Championship Series of the 1994 ATP Tour. It was the 24th edition of the tournament and was held from February 7 through February 14, 1994. Second-seeded Todd Martin won the singles title.

== Finals ==
=== Singles ===
(United States) Todd Martin defeated (United States) Brad Gilbert 6–4, 7–5

- It was Martin's 1st singles title of the year, and the 2nd of his career.

=== Doubles ===
(Zimbabwe) Byron Black / (United States) Jonathan Stark defeated (United States) Jim Grabb / (United States) Jared Palmer 6–2, 6–4
