= Hendrik Dreekmann =

German tennis player (born 1975)

- Country (sports): Germany
- Residence: Bielefeld, Germany
- Born: 29 January 1975 (age 50); Bielefeld, Germany
- Height: 1.88 m (6 ft 2 in)
- Turned pro: 1991
- Retired: 2003
- Plays: Right-handed (two-handed backhand)
- Coach: Ion Geanta
- Prize money: $1,366,435

Singles
- Career record: 97–118
- Career titles: 0
- Highest ranking: No. 39 (30 September 1996)

Grand Slam singles results
- Australian Open: 3R (1995)
- French Open: QF (1994)
- Wimbledon: 2R (1997, 1998)
- US Open: 3R (1996)

Doubles
- Career record: 5–16
- Career titles: 0
- Highest ranking: No. 296 (28 October 1996)
- Last updated on: 11 February 2022.

Hendrik Dreekmann (German pronunciation: [ˈhɛn.dʁɪk ˈdʁeːk.man]; born 29 January 1975) is a former tennis player from Germany, who turned professional in 1991. He reached the quarterfinals of the 1994 French Open and the 1997 Miami Masters.

== Personal life ==
Dreekmann was born in Bielefeld, West Germany, on 29 January 1975. He has been married to former long jumper Susen Tiedtke since 28 January 2005.

== Career ==
=== Juniors ===
As a junior, Dreekmann was the runner-up at the 1989 European Junior Championships in Sofia, and reached the semis at the 1991 Orange Bowl.

=== Pro tour ===
Dreekmann's greatest result in singles was reaching the quarterfinals of the 1994 French Open, only the second grand slam he had participated in. En route he defeated Adrian Voinea, Richey Reneberg and former top tenners Carlos Costa and Aaron Krickstein. In the quarter-finals, Dreekmann led Magnus Larsson two sets to love, had six match points, but eventually lost in five sets.

The right-hander reached his highest individual ranking on the ATP Tour on 30 September 1996, when he became World No. 39.

== ATP career finals ==
=== Singles: 2 (2 runner-ups) ===
Legend Grand Slam Tournaments (0–0) ATP World Tour Finals (0–0) ATP Masters Series (0–0) ATP Championship Series (0–0) ATP World Series (0–2)	Finals by surface Hard (0–2) Clay (0–0) Grass (0–0) Carpet (0–0)	Finals by setting Outdoors (0–1) Indoors (0–1)

Result	W–L	Date	Tournament	Tier	Surface	Opponent	Score
Loss	0–1	Apr 1994	Sun City, South Africa	World Series	Hard	(Germany) Markus Zoecke	1–6, 4–6
Loss	0–2	Sep 1996	Basel, Switzerland	World Series	Hard	(United States) Pete Sampras	5–7, 2–6, 0–6

=== Doubles: 1 (1 runner-up) ===
Legend Grand Slam Tournaments (0–0) ATP World Tour Finals (0–0) ATP Masters Series (0–0) ATP Championship Series (0–0) ATP World Series (0–1)	Finals by surface Hard (0–1) Clay (0–0) Grass (0–0) Carpet (0–0)	Finals by setting Outdoors (0–1) Indoors (0–0)

Result	W–L	Date	Tournament	Tier	Surface	Partner	Opponents	Score
Loss	0–1	Aug 1996	Long Island, United States	World Series	Hard	(Russia) Alexander Volkov	(United States) Luke Jensen (United States) Murphy Jensen	3–6, 6–7

== ATP Challenger and ITF Futures finals ==
=== Singles: 6 (3–3) ===
Legend ATP Challenger (3–3) ITF Futures (0–0)	Finals by surface Hard (2–1) Clay (0–0) Grass (0–0) Carpet (1–2)

Result	W–L	Date	Tournament	Tier	Surface	Opponent	Score
Loss	0-1	Jan 1994	Wellington, New Zealand	Challenger	Hard	(Australia) Todd Woodbridge	3–6, 3–6
Loss	0-2	Feb 1994	Rennes, France	Challenger	Carpet	(Czech Republic) Daniel Vacek	3–6, 4–6
Win	1-2	Feb 1996	Lippstadt, Germany	Challenger	Carpet	(Sweden) Patrik Fredriksson	6–3, 6–4
Loss	1-3	Jan 1997	Heilbronn, Germany	Challenger	Carpet	(Sweden) Henrik Holm	3–6, 6–2, 0–6
Win	2-3	Nov 1997	Aachen, Germany	Challenger	Hard	(Czech Republic) Jiří Novák	5–7, 7–6, 6–3
Win	3-3	Nov 1998	Aachen, Germany	Challenger	Hard	(Bulgaria) Orlin Stanoytchev	7–6, 6–4

=== Doubles: 2 (1–1) ===
Legend ATP Challenger (0–0) ITF Futures (1–1)	Finals by surface Hard (0–0) Clay (1–1) Grass (0–0) Carpet (0–0)

Result	W–L	Date	Tournament	Tier	Surface	Partner	Opponents	Score
Loss	0–1	May 2003	Germany F4, Mannheim	Futures	Clay	(Germany) Franz Stauder	(Germany) Markus Bayer (Germany) Florian Jeschonek	6–4, 2–6, 6–7^{(5–7)}
Win	1–1	Jul 2006	Germany F9, Espelkamp	Futures	Clay	(Germany) Franz Stauder	(Germany) Martin Emmrich (Germany) Tobias Kamke	7–5, 7–6^{(7–3)}

== Performance timeline ==
Key
W	F	SF	QF	#R	RR	Q#	DNQ	A	NH

(W) winner; (F) finalist; (SF) semifinalist; (QF) quarterfinalist; (#R) rounds 4, 3, 2, 1; (RR) round-robin stage; (Q#) qualification round; (DNQ) did not qualify; (A) absent; (NH) not held; (SR) strike rate (events won / competed); (W–L) win–loss record.

=== Singles ===
Tournament	1993	1994	1995	1996	1997	1998	1999	SR	W–L	Win %
Grand Slam tournaments
Australian Open	A	1R	3R	1R	1R	1R	2R	0 / 6	3–6	33%
French Open	A	QF	2R	2R	1R	A	1R	0 / 5	6–5	55%
Wimbledon	A	1R	1R	1R	2R	2R	1R	0 / 6	2–6	25%
US Open	A	2R	1R	3R	1R	2R	1R	0 / 6	4–6	40%
Win–loss	0–0	5–4	3–4	3–4	1–4	2–3	1–4	0 / 23	15–23	39%
ATP Tour Masters 1000
Indian Wells	A	A	Q2	Q3	2R	2R	Q1	0 / 2	2–2	50%
Miami	A	A	1R	3R	QF	2R	3R	0 / 5	9–5	64%
Monte Carlo	A	A	A	1R	A	A	A	0 / 1	0–1	0%
Hamburg	1R	1R	1R	1R	1R	Q1	1R	0 / 6	0–6	0%
Stuttgart	A	A	A	1R	Q1	Q2	A	0 / 1	0–1	0%
Win–loss	0–1	0–1	0–2	2–4	5–3	2–2	2–2	0 / 15	11–15	42%
