= Todd Meringoff =

American tennis player

- Country (sports): United States
- Born: May 7, 1974 (age 52)
- Prize money: $14,123

Singles
- Highest ranking: No. 641 (July 13, 1998)

Doubles
- Career record: 1–4
- Highest ranking: No. 343 (September 20, 1999)

Todd Meringoff (born May 7, 1974) is an American former professional tennis player.

A native of Long Island, Meringoff was a varsity tennis player with Harvard University from 1993 to 1996.

Meringoff competed on the professional tour in the late 1990s, reaching career best rankings of 641 in singles and 343 in doubles. His best performance on the ATP Tour was a quarter-final appearance in doubles at the 1999 Waldbaum's Hamlet Cup in Long Island, partnering Harvard teammate Andrew Rueb.

== ITF Futures titles ==
=== Doubles: (6) ===
| No. | Date | Tournament | Surface | Partner | Opponents | Score |
|---|---|---|---|---|---|---|
| 1. | Jan 1998 | India F2, Chandigarh | Grass | (Germany) Marcus Hilpert | (Lebanon) Ali Hamadeh (United States) Andrew Rueb | 6–3, 6–4 |
| 2. | Mar 1998 | Japan F1, Ishiwa | Clay | (United States) Andrew Rueb | (New Zealand) James Greenhalgh (Australia) Andrew Painter | 6–4, 6–2 |
| 3. | Mar 1998 | Japan F2, Shirako | Carpet | (United States) Andrew Rueb | (Japan) Yaoki Ishii (Japan) Hiroyasu Sato | 6–0, 6–3 |
| 4. | Jun 1998 | Canada F1, Mississauga | Hard | (Lebanon) Ali Hamadeh | (Canada) Jocelyn Robichaud (United States) Michael Russell | 6–4, 6–7, 6–3 |
| 5. | Sep 1998 | Sweden F1, Gothenburg | Hard | (United States) Mitty Arnold | (Sweden) Joel Christensen (Sweden) Robert Lindstedt | 4–6, 6–4, 6–3 |
| 6. | Jan 1999 | India F2, Ahmedabad | Hard | (United States) Andrew Rueb | (Canada) Simon Larose (Canada) Jocelyn Robichaud | 7–6, 6–3 |
