= T. J. Middleton =

American tennis player

- Country (sports): United States
- Residence: Jackson, Mississippi, U.S.
- Born: May 2, 1968 (age 57) Auburn, New York, U.S.
- Height: 1.82 m (6 ft 0 in)
- Turned pro: 1990
- Retired: 2000
- Plays: Right-handed
- Prize money: US$378,226

Singles
- Career record: 2–5
- Career titles: 0
- Highest ranking: No. 221 (September 23, 1991)

Grand Slam singles results
- Australian Open: DNP
- French Open: DNP
- Wimbledon: DNP
- US Open: DNP

Doubles
- Career record: 95–131
- Career titles: 0
- Highest ranking: No. 63 (June 22, 1991)

Grand Slam doubles results
- Australian Open: QF (1993)
- French Open: 1R (1993, 1994, 1997, 1999)
- Wimbledon: 3R (1993)
- US Open: 2R (1999)

T. J. Middleton (born May 2, 1968) is a former professional tennis player from the United States. Middleton attended the University of Georgia where he helped lead the Bulldogs to the 1987 National Championship. He was the 1990 SEC Doubles Champion. He is a member of the Delta chapter of the Sigma Chi fraternity. He turned professional in 1990 and had a career that spanned 10 years before his retirement at the end of 2000. A doubles specialist, he achieved a career high singles ranking of world No. 221 and his highest doubles ranking was world No. 63.

== Doubles ==
Middleton did not win any senior doubles titles but reached the final on four separate occasions, at Casablanca in 1992, Long Island (1997), Marseille (1998) and Boston (1999). In 1994 he reached the Wimbledon Mixed Doubles final.

== Post-professional tennis ==
Middleton was invited to play at the 2008 Wimbledon Championships in the Gentlemen's Invitational Doubles, playing with David Wheaton in the round-robin group. He had won the tournament in 2004 with the same partner and finished runners up in 2005 and 2006.

== Career finals ==
=== Doubles (3 losses) ===
Result	No.	Date	Tournament	Surface	Partner	Opponents	Score
Loss	1.	Mar 1992	Casablanca, Morocco	Clay	(Latvia) Ģirts Dzelde	(Argentina) Horacio de la Peña (Mexico) Jorge Lozano	6–2, 4–6, 6–7
Loss	2.	Aug 1997	Long Island, U.S.	Hard	(United States) Mark Keil	(South Africa) Marcos Ondruska (Germany) David Prinosil	4–6, 4–6
Loss	3.	Feb 1998	Marseille, France	Hard (i)	(United States) Mark Keil	(United States) Donald Johnson (United States) Francisco Montana	4–6, 6–3, 3–6
