= 1997 ABN AMRO World Tennis Tournament =

- Date: 3–9 March
- Edition: 25th
- Category: ATP World Series
- Draw: 32S / 16D
- Prize money: $725,000
- Surface: Carpet / indoor
- Location: Rotterdam, Netherlands
- Venue: Rotterdam Ahoy

Champions

Singles
- (Netherlands) Richard Krajicek

Doubles
- (Netherlands) Jacco Eltingh / (Netherlands) Paul Haarhuis
- ABN AMRO World Tennis Tournament

The 1997 ABN AMRO World Tennis Tournament was a men's tennis tournament played on indoor carpet courts at Rotterdam Ahoy in the Netherlands. It was part of the World Series of the 1997 ATP Tour. The tournament ran from 3 March through 9 March 1997. Richard Krajicek won the singles title.

The singles draw featured ATP No. 5, 1996 Grand Slam Cup runner-up, Moscow and Zagreb titlist and Rotterdam defending champion Goran Ivanišević, reigning Wimbledon champion Richard Krajicek and Paris, Stockholm and Marseille winner Thomas Enqvist. Also seeded were New Haven and Vienna finalist Jan Siemerink, Hamburg, Kitzbühel and Marbella runner-up Àlex Corretja, Paul Haarhuis, Cédric Pioline and Petr Korda.

== Finals ==
=== Men's singles ===
(Netherlands) Richard Krajicek defeated (Czech Republic) Daniel Vacek 7–6^{(7–4)}, 7–6^{(7–5)}

- It was Krajicek's 1st title of the year and the 14th of his career.

=== Men's doubles ===
(Netherlands) Jacco Eltingh / (Netherlands) Paul Haarhuis defeated (Belgium) Libor Pimek / (South Africa) Byron Talbot 7–6, 6–4

- It was Eltingh's 2nd title of the year and the 34th of his career. It was Haarhuis' 2nd title of the year and the 33rd of his career.
