= 1996 India Open – Singles =

Singles
- 1996 India Open

Final
- Champion: (Sweden) Thomas Enqvist
- Runner-up: (Zimbabwe) Byron Black
- Score: 6–2, 7–6^{(7–3)}

Details
- Draw: 32
- Seeds: 8

Events
Singles	Doubles
Maharashtra Open	· 1997 →

Thomas Enqvist won in the final 6–2, 7–6^{(7–3)} against Byron Black.

== Seeds ==
1. (Sweden) Thomas Enqvist (champion)
2. (South Africa) Wayne Ferreira (second round)
3. (Zimbabwe) Byron Black (final)
4. (Switzerland) Jakob Hlasek (second round)
5. (United Kingdom) Tim Henman (first round)
6. (Sweden) Jonas Björkman (first round)
7. (Belgium) Johan van Herck (second round)
8. (France) Jérôme Golmard (quarterfinals)

== Draw ==
=== Key ===
- Q = Qualifier
- WC = Wild card
- LL = Lucky loser
- Alt = Alternate
- SE = Special exempt
- PR = Protected ranking
- ITF = ITF entry
- JE = Junior exempt
- w/o = Walkover
- r = Retired
- d = Defaulted
- SR = Special ranking

=== Finals ===
Semifinals
1	(Sweden) Thomas Enqvist	7^{8}	7
WC	(United States) Jonathan Stark	6^{6}	5
3	(Zimbabwe) Byron Black	6	6
(Germany) Alex Rădulescu	4	4

Final
1	(Sweden) Thomas Enqvist	6	7^{7}
3	(Zimbabwe) Byron Black	2	6^{3}

=== Top half ===
First round
1	(Sweden) T Enqvist	6	6
(United Kingdom) M Petchey	4	4
WC	(India) S Prahlad	3	2
WC	(India) M Bhupathi	6	6
(Uzbekistan) O Ogorodov	7	2	3
(France) J-P Fleurian	5	6	6
(Sweden) A Järryd	6^{5}	3
7	(Belgium) J van Herck	7^{7}	6
4	(Switzerland) J Hlasek	6	7
(United Kingdom) C Wilkinson	3	5
Q	(India) S Kirtane	2	1
(Australia) S Stolle	6	6
(Sweden) M Norman	1	6^{4}
WC	(United States) J Stark	6	7^{7}
(Denmark) F Fetterlein	1	6	6
5	(United Kingdom) T Henman	6	1	0

Second round
1	(Sweden) T Enqvist	6	6
WC	(India) M Bhupathi	3	0
(France) J-P Fleurian	6	6
7	(Belgium) J van Herck	1	4
4	(Switzerland) J Hlasek	7	3	5
(Australia) S Stolle	5	6	7
WC	(United States) J Stark	6	6
(Denmark) F Fetterlein	3	4

Quarterfinals
1	(Sweden) T Enqvist	6	6
(France) J-P Fleurian	3	3
(Australia) S Stolle	2	6	6^{3}
WC	(United States) J Stark	6	3	7^{7}

Semifinals
1	(Sweden) T Enqvist	7^{8}	7
WC	(United States) J Stark	6^{6}	5

=== Bottom half ===
First round
6	(Sweden) J Björkman	3	4
(Sweden) N Kulti	6	6
(Germany) P Baur	3	3
(Italy) C Caratti	6	6
Q	(United Kingdom) D Sapsford	7^{7}	6
Q	(Germany) C Arriens	6^{3}	4
(India) L Paes	6	3	5
3	(Zimbabwe) B Black	3	6	7
8	(France) J Golmard	6	6
(Slovakia) J Krošlák	4	2
Q	(Netherlands) J Winnink	6	6
LL	(Netherlands) S Groen	4	3
(Germany) A Rădulescu	7^{8}	6
(France) L Roux	6^{6}	2
(Belgium) D Norman	4	4
2	(South Africa) W Ferreira	6	6

Second round
(Sweden) N Kulti	6^{4}	5
(Italy) C Caratti	7^{7}	7
Q	(United Kingdom) D Sapsford	1	2
3	(Zimbabwe) B Black	6	6
8	(France) J Golmard	6	6
Q	(Netherlands) J Winnink	1	3
(Germany) A Rădulescu	6	6
2	(South Africa) W Ferreira	1	1

Quarterfinals
(Italy) C Caratti	6	1	5
3	(Zimbabwe) B Black	3	6	7
8	(France) J Golmard	6	5	0
(Germany) A Rădulescu	4	7	6

Semifinals
3	(Zimbabwe) B Black	6	6
(Germany) A Rădulescu	4	4
