= 1997 ABN AMRO World Tennis Tournament – Singles =

Singles
- 1997 ABN AMRO World Tennis Tournament

Final
- Champion: (Netherlands) Richard Krajicek
- Runner-up: (Czech Republic) Daniel Vacek
- Score: 7–6^{(7–4)}, 7–6^{(7–5)}

Details
- Draw: 32
- Seeds: 8

Events
Singles	Doubles
← 1996 ·	ABN AMRO World Tennis Tournament	· 1998 →

Goran Ivanišević was the defending champion but lost in the semifinals to Daniel Vacek.

Richard Krajicek won in the final 7–6^{(7–4)}, 7–6^{(7–5)} against Vacek.

== Seeds ==
A champion seed is indicated in bold text while text in italics indicates the round in which that seed was eliminated.

1. (Croatia) Goran Ivanišević (semifinals)
2. (Netherlands) **Richard Krajicek (champion)**
3. (Sweden) Thomas Enqvist (semifinals)
4. (Netherlands) Jan Siemerink (first round)
5. (Spain) Àlex Corretja (first round)
6. (Netherlands) Paul Haarhuis (first round)
7. (France) Cédric Pioline (first round)
8. (Czech Republic) Petr Korda (quarterfinals)

== Draw ==
=== Key ===
- Q = Qualifier
- WC = Wild card
- LL = Lucky loser
- Alt = Alternate
- ITF = ITF entry
- PR = Protected ranking
- SR = Special ranking
- SE = Special exempt
- JE = Junior exempt
- JR = Junior Accelerator Programme entrant
- CO = College Accelerator Programme entrant
- NG = Next Gen Accelerator Program entrant
- w/o = Walkover
- r = Retired
- d = Defaulted

First round
1	(Croatia) **G Ivanišević**	**6**	**6**
Q	(France) F Santoro	3	4
Q	(France) S Simian	3	2
(France) **G Raoux**	**6**	**6**
(France) A Boetsch	4	2
(Belgium) **J van Herck**	**6**	**6**
(Morocco) K Alami	3	5
8	(Czech Republic) **P Korda**	**6**	**7**
4	(Netherlands) J Siemerink	6^{3}	6^{2}
(Czech Republic) **D Vacek**	**7^{7}**	**7^{7}**
WC	(Netherlands) **D v Scheppingen**	**6**	**6**
(Australia) R Fromberg	2	4
Q	(France) **O Delaître**	1	**7^{7}**	**6**
WC	(Netherlands) J Eltingh	**6**	6^{5}	4
(Italy) **R Furlan**	**6**	3	**6**
5	(Spain) À Corretja	4	**6**	3
6	(Netherlands) P Haarhuis	3	4
Q	(Germany) **M Sinner**	**6**	**6**
(Morocco) H Arazi	2	**6**	3
(Germany) **A Rădulescu**	**6**	4	**6**
(Russia) A Olhovskiy	2	2
SE	(Germany) **N Kiefer**	**6**	**6**
(Czech Republic) B Ulihrach	5	**7^{7}**	2
WC/3	(Sweden) **T Enqvist**	**7**	6^{4}	**6**
7	(France) C Pioline	3	**6**	2
(Germany) **M Stich**	**6**	3	**6**
(Sweden) T Johansson	5	6^{3}
(Spain) **T Carbonell**	**7**	**7^{7}**
(Germany) **D Prinosil**	**6**	2	**6**
(Slovakia) K Kučera	2	**6**	3
(Czech Republic) M Damm	4	2
2	(Netherlands) **R Krajicek**	**6**	**6**

Second round
1	(Croatia) **G Ivanišević**	**7**	6^{5}	**6**
(France) G Raoux	5	**7^{7}**	3
(Belgium) J van Herck	6^{4}	2
8	(Czech Republic) **P Korda**	**7^{7}**	**6**
(Czech Republic) **D Vacek**	**7^{7}**	4	**6**
WC	(Netherlands) D v Scheppingen	6^{5}	**6**	1
(France) O Delaître	5	6^{5}
(Italy) **R Furlan**	**7**	**7^{7}**
Q	(Germany) M Sinner	**6**	6^{2}	4
(Germany) **A Rădulescu**	3	**7^{7}**	**6**
SE	(Germany) N Kiefer	2	2
WC/3	(Sweden) **T Enqvist**	**6**	**6**
(Germany) **M Stich**	**7^{7}**	**6**
(Spain) T Carbonell	6^{2}	4
(Germany) D Prinosil	6^{7}	6^{5}
2	(Netherlands) **R Krajicek**	**7^{9}**	**7^{7}**

Quarterfinals
1	(Croatia) **G Ivanišević**	**w/o**
(Czech Republic) P Korda
(Czech Republic) **D Vacek**	**6**	1	**6**
(Italy) R Furlan	4	**6**	3
(Germany) A Rădulescu	6^{8}	3
WC/3	(Sweden) **T Enqvist**	**7^{10}**	**6**
(Germany) M Stich	6^{4}	6^{3}
2	(Netherlands) **R Krajicek**	**7^{7}**	**7^{7}**

Semifinals
1	(Croatia) G Ivanišević	4	**6**	6^{2}
(Czech Republic) **D Vacek**	**6**	1	**7^{7}**
WC/3	(Sweden) T Enqvist	**7^{7}**	3	4
2	(Netherlands) **R Krajicek**	6^{5}	**6**	**6**

Final
(Czech Republic) Daniel Vacek	6^{4}	6^{5}
2	(Netherlands) **Richard Krajicek**	**7^{7}**	**7^{7}**
