= 1998 Open 13 – Doubles =

Doubles
- 1998 Open 13

Final
- Champions: (United States) Donald Johnson (United States) Francisco Montana
- Runners-up: (United States) Mark Keil (United States) T.J. Middleton
- Score: 6–4, 3–6, 6–3

Events
| Singles | Doubles |
| ← 1997 · | Open 13 | · 1999 → |

Thomas Enqvist and Magnus Larsson were the defending champions, but did not participate this year.

Donald Johnson and Francisco Montana won the title, defeating Mark Keil and T.J. Middleton 6–4, 3–6, 6–3 in the final.

== Seeds ==
1. (Russia) Yevgeny Kafelnikov / (Czech Republic) Daniel Vacek (semifinals)
2. (United States) Donald Johnson / (United States) Francisco Montana (champions)
3. (Spain) Tomás Carbonell / (Spain) Francisco Roig (quarterfinals)
4. (Netherlands) Tom Nijssen / (United States) Jeff Tarango (first round)

== Draw ==
=== Key ===
- Q = Qualifier
- WC = Wild card
- LL = Lucky loser
- Alt = Alternate
- ITF = ITF entry
- PR = Protected ranking
- SR = Special ranking
- SE = Special exempt
- JE = Junior exempt
- JR = Junior Accelerator Programme entrant
- CO = College Accelerator Programme entrant
- NG = Next Gen Accelerator Program entrant
- w/o = Walkover
- r = Retired
- d = Defaulted

=== Draw ===
First round
1 | (Russia) Y Kafelnikov (Czech Republic) D Vacek | 6 | 6
(South Africa) M Barnard (South Africa) B Haygarth | 3 | 3
(Italy) C Brandi (Italy) F Messori | 2 | 7 | 4
(United Kingdom) D Sapsford (United Kingdom) C Wilkinson | 6 | 6 | 6
3 | (Spain) T Carbonell (Spain) F Roig | 6 | 7 | 6
(Sweden) P Nyborg (Sweden) M Tillström | 7 | 6 | 4
(United States) M Keil (United States) TJ Middleton | 6 | 7
Q | (France) J-F Bachelot (France) J-M Pequery | 3 | 6
(Australia) P Kilderry (Spain) A Martín | 3 | 6 | 6
WC | (France) A Clément (France) S Grosjean | 6 | 3 | 0
(Spain) J Alonso (Brazil) G Kuerten | 6 | 6
4 | (Netherlands) T Nijssen (United States) J Tarango | 3 | 4
(South Africa) D Adams (France) J-P Fleurian | 6 | 6
(Morocco) K Alami (South Africa) P Rosner | 3 | 4
WC | (France) A Boetsch (Belgium) F Dewulf | 4 | 4
2 | (United States) D Johnson (United States) F Montana | 6 | 6

Quarterfinals
1 | (Russia) Y Kafelnikov (Czech Republic) D Vacek | 6 | 5 | 7
(United Kingdom) D Sapsford (United Kingdom) C Wilkinson | 3 | 7 | 6
3 | (Spain) T Carbonell (Spain) F Roig | 4 | 3
(United States) M Keil (United States) TJ Middleton | 6 | 6
(Australia) P Kilderry (Spain) A Martín | 2 | 4
(Spain) J Alonso (Brazil) G Kuerten | 6 | 6
(South Africa) D Adams (France) J-P Fleurian | 6 | 3 | 4
2 | (United States) D Johnson (United States) F Montana | 3 | 6 | 6

Semifinals
1 | (Russia) Y Kafelnikov (Czech Republic) D Vacek | 5 | 3
(United States) M Keil (United States) TJ Middleton | 7 | 6
(Spain) J Alonso (Brazil) G Kuerten | 4 | 4
2 | (United States) D Johnson (United States) F Montana | 6 | 6

Final
(United States) M Keil (United States) TJ Middleton | 4 | 6 | 3
2 | (United States) D Johnson (United States) F Montana | 6 | 3 | 6
