= 1996 Stockholm Open – Doubles =

Doubles
- 1996 Stockholm Open

Final
- Champions: (United States) Patrick Galbraith (United States) Jonathan Stark
- Runners-up: (United States) Todd Martin (United States) Chris Woodruff
- Score: 7–6, 6–4

Details
- Draw: 16
- Seeds: 4

Events
Singles	Doubles
← 1995 ·	Stockholm Open	· 1997 →

Jacco Eltingh and Paul Haarhuis were the defending champions but lost in the semifinals to Patrick Galbraith and Jonathan Stark.

Galbraith and Stark won in the final 7–6, 6–4 against Todd Martin and Chris Woodruff.

== Seeds ==
1. (Netherlands) Jacco Eltingh / (Netherlands) Paul Haarhuis (semifinals)
2. (Sweden) Jonas Björkman / (Sweden) Nicklas Kulti (first round)
3. (United States) Jim Grabb / (United States) Richey Reneberg (quarterfinals)
4. (United States) Patrick Galbraith / (United States) Jonathan Stark (champions)

== Draw ==
=== Key ===
- Q = Qualifier
- WC = Wild card
- LL = Lucky loser
- Alt = Alternate
- SE = Special exempt
- PR = Protected ranking
- ITF = ITF entry
- JE = Junior exempt
- w/o = Walkover
- r = Retired
- d = Defaulted
- SR = Special ranking

First round
1	(Netherlands) J Eltingh (Netherlands) P Haarhuis	6	6
(United States) M Keil (France) G Raoux	4	2
(United States) T Kronemann (Australia) D Macpherson	7	6
(United States) K Kinnear (United States) J Waite	6	4
4	(United States) P Galbraith (United States) J Stark	6	6
WC	(Sweden) T Enqvist (Sweden) M Tillström	4	4
(Australia) S Stolle (Australia) M Tebbutt	4	6	4
(The Bahamas) M Knowles (The Bahamas) R Smith	6	4	6
Q	(South Africa) G Muller (South Africa) M Ondruska	5	7	7
(United States) L Jensen (Netherlands) J Siemerink	7	6	6
WC	(Sweden) A Järryd (Sweden) M Larsson	6	3	2
3	(United States) J Grabb (United States) R Reneberg	3	6	6
(Sweden) D Ekerot (United States) J Tarango	6	6	3
(South Africa) M Barnard (Sweden) P Nyborg	7	4	6
WC	(United States) T Martin (United States) C Woodruff	6	7
2	(Sweden) J Björkman (Sweden) N Kulti	3	6

Quarterfinals
1	(Netherlands) J Eltingh (Netherlands) P Haarhuis	6	6
(United States) T Kronemann (Australia) D Macpherson	3	4
4	(United States) P Galbraith (United States) J Stark	6	6	6
(The Bahamas) M Knowles (The Bahamas) R Smith	7	3	2
Q	(South Africa) G Muller (South Africa) M Ondruska	7	7
3	(United States) J Grabb (United States) R Reneberg	6	6
(South Africa) M Barnard (Sweden) P Nyborg	2	2
WC	(United States) T Martin (United States) C Woodruff	6	6

Semifinals
1	(Netherlands) J Eltingh (Netherlands) P Haarhuis	3	6
4	(United States) P Galbraith (United States) J Stark	6	7
Q	(South Africa) G Muller (South Africa) M Ondruska	6	2	1
WC	(United States) T Martin (United States) C Woodruff	3	6	6

Final
4	(United States) P Galbraith (United States) J Stark	7	6
WC	(United States) T Martin (United States) C Woodruff	6	4
