= Malikaa Marathe =

Indian tennis player

- Country (sports): India
- Residence: Pune, India
- Born: 30 April 2003 (age 22) Pune, India
- Plays: Right-handed (two-handed backhand)
- Coach: Sandeep Kirtane

Singles
- Career titles: 1
- Highest ranking: 343 (21 January 2019) (ITF) 1 (India)
- Current ranking: 369 (8 April 2019)

Team competitions
- Last updated on: 15 April 2019.

Malikaa Marathe (born 30 April 2003) is an Indian tennis player.

== Biography ==
Marathe was born in Pune, India. At the age of 4, she was diagnosed with amblyopia. She had to wear a patch on her right eye, which was weak for four years until it recovered. She began playing tennis at age 6.

Marathe won her first State Championship in 2013 in the U-10 category. In 2015, she won the National Championship in the U-12 category. She represented India in ITF Asia U-14 and Under Development Championship where she won a gold medal in doubles. In 2017, she qualified for the pre-qualifying tournament, "Rendez-Vous à Roland Garros", for the French Open Girls' singles.

Her coach is Sandeep Kirtane.
