= Indian Open =

Indian Open may refer to:

- Indian Open (men's tennis)
- Indian Open (women's tennis)
- Indian Open (golf)
- Indian Open (snooker)
- Indian Open (table tennis)

== See also ==
- Indian Defence, a group of Chess openings, also known as Indian openings
- 1996 India Open, inaugural edition of the Chennai Open
- India Open, an annual badminton competition
