= 1995 Stockholm Open – Doubles =

Doubles
- 1995 Stockholm Open

Final
- Champions: (Netherlands) Jacco Eltingh (Netherlands) Paul Haarhuis
- Runners-up: (Canada) Grant Connell (United States) Patrick Galbraith
- Score: 3–6, 6–2, 7–6

Details
- Draw: 16
- Seeds: 4

Events
Singles	Doubles
← 1994 ·	Stockholm Open	· 1996 →

Todd Woodbridge and Mark Woodforde were the defending champions, but lost in the semifinals this year.

Jacco Eltingh and Paul Haarhuis won the title, defeating Grant Connell and Patrick Galbraith 3–6, 6–2, 7–6 in the final.

== Seeds ==
1. (Netherlands) Jacco Eltingh / (Netherlands) Paul Haarhuis (champions)
2. (Australia) Todd Woodbridge / (Australia) Mark Woodforde (semifinals)
3. (Canada) Grant Connell / (United States) Patrick Galbraith (final)
4. (The Bahamas) Mark Knowles / (Canada) Daniel Nestor (semifinals)

== Draw ==
=== Key ===
- Q = Qualifier
- WC = Wild card
- LL = Lucky loser
- Alt = Alternate
- SE = Special exempt
- PR = Protected ranking
- ITF = ITF entry
- JE = Junior exempt
- w/o = Walkover
- r = Retired
- d = Defaulted
- SR = Special ranking

=== Draw ===
First round
1	(Netherlands) J Eltingh (Netherlands) P Haarhuis	6	6
(Australia) W Arthurs (Netherlands) M Oosting	3	4
(France) O Delaître (Italy) D Nargiso	3	6
(United States) T Martin (United States) J Stark	6	7
4	(The Bahamas) M Knowles (Canada) D Nestor	6	4	6
(United States) M Keil (Sweden) P Nyborg	2	6	4
WC	(Sweden) H Holm (Sweden) M Larsson	6	4
(Sweden) J Björkman (Sweden) S Edberg	7	6
(United States) T Kronemann (Australia) D Macpherson	6	0	2
(South Africa) D Adams (Canada) S Lareau	4	6	6
Q	(Australia) A Kratzmann (Australia) B Larkham	6	1	4
3	(Canada) G Connell (United States) P Galbraith	2	6	6
WC	(Sweden) A Järryd (Sweden) M Tillström	3	2
(United States) J Grabb (United States) R Reneberg	6	6
WC	(Sweden) T Enqvist (Sweden) M Wilander	4	6
2	(Australia) T Woodbridge (Australia) M Woodforde	6	7

Quarterfinals
1	(Netherlands) J Eltingh (Netherlands) P Haarhuis	7	6	6
(United States) T Martin (United States) J Stark	6	7	3
4	(The Bahamas) M Knowles (Canada) D Nestor	6	4	6
(Sweden) J Björkman (Sweden) S Edberg	3	6	4
(South Africa) D Adams (Canada) S Lareau	7	2	2
3	(Canada) G Connell (United States) P Galbraith	6	6	6
(United States) J Grabb (United States) R Reneberg	6	1
2	(Australia) T Woodbridge (Australia) M Woodforde	7	6

Semifinals
1	(Netherlands) J Eltingh (Netherlands) P Haarhuis	6	6
4	(The Bahamas) M Knowles (Canada) D Nestor	4	3
3	(Canada) G Connell (United States) P Galbraith	7	6
2	(Australia) T Woodbridge (Australia) M Woodforde	6	4

Final
1	(Netherlands) J Eltingh (Netherlands) P Haarhuis	3	6	7
3	(Canada) G Connell (United States) P Galbraith	6	2	6
