= 1996 Stockholm Open – Singles =

Singles
- 1996 Stockholm Open

Final
- Champion: (Sweden) Thomas Enqvist
- Runner-up: (United States) Todd Martin
- Score: 7–5, 6–4, 7–6^{(7–0)}

Details
- Draw: 32
- Seeds: 8

Events
Singles	Doubles
← 1995 ·	Stockholm Open	· 1997 →

Thomas Enqvist was the defending champion and won in the final 7–5, 6–4, 7–6^{(7–0)} against Todd Martin.

== Seeds ==
1. (South Africa) Wayne Ferreira (first round)
2. (United States) Todd Martin (final)
3. (Sweden) Thomas Enqvist (champion)
4. (Spain) Albert Costa (first round)
5. (Netherlands) Jan Siemerink (second round)
6. (Sweden) Stefan Edberg (first round)
7. (United States) Richey Reneberg (quarterfinals)
8. n/a

== Draw ==
=== Key ===
- Q = Qualifier
- WC = Wild card
- LL = Lucky loser
- Alt = Alternate
- SE = Special exempt
- PR = Protected ranking
- ITF = ITF entry
- JE = Junior exempt
- w/o = Walkover
- r = Retired
- d = Defaulted
- SR = Special ranking

=== Final ===
Semifinals
WC	(Sweden) Thomas Johansson	3	6	3
3	(Sweden) Thomas Enqvist	6	3	6
WC	(Sweden) Magnus Norman	3	0^{r}
2	(United States) Todd Martin	6	3

Final
3	(Sweden) Thomas Enqvist	7	6	7^{7}
2	(United States) Todd Martin	5	4	6^{0}

=== Section 1 ===
First round
1	(South Africa) W Ferreira	3	6	3
(United Kingdom) G Rusedski	6	3	6
(Sweden) J Björkman	3	6	1
(Australia) S Stolle	6	4	6
WC	(Sweden) T Johansson	6	6
(Netherlands) P Haarhuis	2	3
(Belgium) F Dewulf	6	6
LL	(South Africa) M Ondruska	4	4
3	(Sweden) T Enqvist	6	6
Q	(Australia) R Fromberg	3	1
(United States) C Woodruff	6	6
Q	(United States) J Tarango	3	4
WC	(Sweden) P Fredriksson	6	6
(France) G Raoux	4	4
(Sweden) N Kulti	7^{7}	6
6	(Sweden) S Edberg	6^{5}	3

Second round
(United Kingdom) G Rusedski	6	6
(Australia) S Stolle	4	3
WC	(Sweden) T Johansson	6	6
(Belgium) F Dewulf	3	3
3	(Sweden) T Enqvist	7^{7}	7^{7}
(United States) C Woodruff	6^{3}	6^{2}
WC	(Sweden) P Fredriksson	7	7^{7}
(Sweden) N Kulti	5	6^{3}

Quarterfinals
(United Kingdom) G Rusedski	7^{7}	3	6^{6}
WC	(Sweden) T Johansson	6^{5}	6	7^{8}
3	(Sweden) T Enqvist	6	6
WC	(Sweden) P Fredriksson	2	0

Semifinals
WC	(Sweden) T Johansson	3	6	3
3	(Sweden) T Enqvist	6	3	6

=== Section 2 ===
First round
5	(Netherlands) J Siemerink	3	6	7^{8}
(Sweden) M Tillström	6	4	6^{6}
(United States) V Spadea	6	7
(Denmark) K Carlsen	3	5
(Austria) G Schaller	6^{3}	1
WC	(Sweden) M Norman	7^{7}	6
(Germany) A Rădulescu	7	6
4	(Spain) A Costa	5	4
7	(United States) R Reneberg	7^{8}	6
Q	(United States) J Stark	6^{6}	4
(Sweden) M Larsson	1	4
(France) A Boetsch	6	6
(Norway) C Ruud	1	7^{7}	1
(Australia) J Stoltenberg	6	6^{5}	6
Q	(United States) J Grabb	2	6	6^{1}
2	(United States) T Martin	6	3	7^{7}

Second round
5	(Netherlands) J Siemerink	4	7^{7}	3
(United States) V Spadea	6	6^{4}	6
WC	(Sweden) M Norman	7	4	6
(Germany) A Rădulescu	5	6	4
7	(United States) R Reneberg	6	6
(France) A Boetsch	3	3
(Australia) J Stoltenberg	3	7	3
2	(United States) T Martin	6	5	6

Quarterfinals
(United States) V Spadea	3	6^{7}
WC	(Sweden) M Norman	6	7^{9}
7	(United States) R Reneberg	2	2
2	(United States) T Martin	6	6

Semifinals
WC	(Sweden) M Norman	3	0^{r}
2	(United States) T Martin	6	3
