= 1997 Marseille Open – Doubles =

Doubles
- 1997 Marseille Open

Final
- Champions: (Sweden) Thomas Enqvist (Sweden) Magnus Larsson
- Runners-up: (France) Olivier Delaître (France) Fabrice Santoro
- Score: 6–3, 6–4

Events
Singles	Doubles
← 1996 ·	Marseille Open	· 1998 →

Jean-Philippe Fleurian and Guillaume Raoux were the defending champions but did not compete that year.

Thomas Enqvist and Magnus Larsson won in the final 6–3, 6–4 against Olivier Delaître and Fabrice Santoro.

== Seeds ==
1. (South Africa) David Adams / (Netherlands) Menno Oosting (semifinals)
2. (United Kingdom) Neil Broad / (South Africa) Piet Norval (quarterfinals)
3. (Spain) Tomás Carbonell / (Spain) Francisco Roig (quarterfinals)
4. (South Africa) John-Laffnie de Jager / (Russia) Andrei Olhovskiy (first round)

== Draw ==
=== Key ===
- Q = Qualifier
- WC = Wild card
- LL = Lucky loser
- Alt = Alternate
- ITF = ITF entry
- PR = Protected ranking
- SR = Special ranking
- SE = Special exempt
- JE = Junior exempt
- JR = Junior Accelerator Programme entrant
- CO = College Accelerator Programme entrant
- NG = Next Gen Accelerator Program entrant
- w/o = Walkover
- r = Retired
- d = Defaulted

First round
1	(South Africa) D Adams (Netherlands) M Oosting	w/o
WC	(France) S Grosjean (France) H Leconte
(South Africa) L Bale (South Africa) C Ferreira	6	7^{7}
Q	(Spain) J Alonso (Italy) V Santopadre	3	6^{2}
4	(South Africa) J-L de Jager (Russia) A Olhovskiy	4	3
(France) O Delaître (France) F Santoro	6	6
(Italy) C Brandi (Italy) S Pescosolido	6	7
(Sweden) P Fredriksson (Netherlands) S Noteboom	2	5
(Hungary) G Köves (Belarus) M Mirnyi	4	6^{7}
(Netherlands) T Kempers (Netherlands) T Nijssen	6	7^{9}
(South Africa) B Haygarth (United States) M Keil	5	2
3	(Spain) T Carbonell (Spain) F Roig	7	6
WC	(Chile) M Ríos (Switzerland) M Rosset	2	6	1
WC	(Sweden) T Enqvist (Sweden) M Larsson	6	2	6
(Federal Republic of Yugoslavia) N Djordjevic (North Macedonia) A Kitinov	4	5
2	(United Kingdom) N Broad (South Africa) P Norval	6	7

Quarterfinals
1	(South Africa) D Adams (Netherlands) M Oosting	6	3	6
(South Africa) L Bale (South Africa) C Ferreira	4	6	1
(France) O Delaître (France) F Santoro	6	6
(Italy) C Brandi (Italy) S Pescosolido	4	2
(Netherlands) T Kempers (Netherlands) T Nijssen	4	6	6
3	(Spain) T Carbonell (Spain) F Roig	6	3	3
WC	(Sweden) T Enqvist (Sweden) M Larsson	4	6	7^{7}
2	(United Kingdom) N Broad (South Africa) P Norval	6	1	6^{4}

Semifinals
1	(South Africa) D Adams (Netherlands) M Oosting	4	4
(France) O Delaître (France) F Santoro	6	6
(Netherlands) T Kempers (Netherlands) T Nijssen	4	4
WC	(Sweden) T Enqvist (Sweden) M Larsson	6	6

Final
(France) O Delaître (France) F Santoro	3	4
WC	(Sweden) T Enqvist (Sweden) M Larsson	6	6
