= 1998 ABN AMRO World Tennis Tournament =

- Date: 2–8 March
- Edition: 26th
- Category: ATP World Series
- Draw: 32S / 16D
- Prize money: $725,000
- Surface: Carpet / indoor
- Location: Rotterdam, Netherlands
- Venue: Rotterdam Ahoy

Champions

Singles
- (Netherlands) Jan Siemerink

Doubles
- (Netherlands) Jacco Eltingh / (Netherlands) Paul Haarhuis
- ABN AMRO World Tennis Tournament

The 1998 ABN AMRO World Tennis Tournament was a men's tennis tournament played on indoor carpet courts. It was the 26th edition of the event known that year as the ABN AMRO World Tennis Tournament, and was part of the ATP World Series of the 1998 ATP Tour. It took place at the Rotterdam Ahoy indoor sporting arena in Rotterdam, Netherlands, from 2 March through 8 March 1998. Unseeded Jan Siemerink won the singles title.

The singles field was led by ATP No. 3, US Open champion and Grand Slam Cup finalist Patrick Rafter, US Open semifinalist and Australian Open quarterfinalist Jonas Björkman, and US Open runner-up, Split finalist, Antwerp winner Greg Rusedski. Other seeds competing were recent London titlist Yevgeny Kafelnikov, St. Petersburg winner and Rotterdam defending champion Richard Krajicek, Sergi Bruguera and Goran Ivanišević.

== Finals ==
=== Singles ===
(Netherlands) Jan Siemerink defeated (Sweden) Thomas Johansson, 7–6^{(7–2)}, 6–2

- It was Jan Siemerink's 1st title of the year, and his 3rd overall.

=== Doubles ===
(Netherlands) Jacco Eltingh / (Netherlands) Paul Haarhuis defeated (United Kingdom) Neil Broad / (South Africa) Piet Norval 7–6, 6–3
