= 1998 Open 13 =

- Date: 2–9 February
- Edition: 6th
- Category: World Series
- Draw: 32S / 16D
- Prize money: $514,250
- Surface: Hard / indoor
- Location: Marseille, France
- Venue: Palais des Sports de Marseille

Champions

Singles
- (Sweden) Thomas Enqvist

Doubles
- (United States) Donald Johnson / (United States) Francisco Montana
- Open 13

The 1998 Open 13 was a men's tennis tournament played on indoor hard courts at the Palais des Sports de Marseille in Marseille, France, that was part of the World Series of the 1998 ATP Tour. It was the sixth edition of the tournament and was held from 2 February to 9 February 1998. Sixth-seeded Thomas Enqvist won the singles title.

== Finals ==
=== Singles ===
(Sweden) Thomas Enqvist defeated (Russia) Yevgeny Kafelnikov 6–4, 6–1

- It was Enqvist's first title of the year and the 13th of his career.

=== Doubles ===
(United States) Donald Johnson / (United States) Francisco Montana defeated (United States) Mark Keil / (United States) T. J. Middleton 6–4, 3–6, 6–3

- It was Johnson's first title of the year and the fourth of his career. It was Montana's first title of the year and the seventh of his career.
