= 1995 Stockholm Open =

- Date: 6–12 November
- Edition: 27th
- Category: International Series
- Draw: 32S / 16D
- Prize money: $800,000
- Surface: Hard / indoor
- Location: Stockholm, Sweden
- Venue: Kungliga tennishallen

Champions

Singles
- (Sweden) Thomas Enqvist

Doubles
- (Netherlands) Jacco Eltingh / (Netherlands) Paul Haarhuis
| ← 1994 · | Stockholm Open | · 1996 → |

The 1995 Stockholm Open was a men's tennis tournament played on indoor hard courts at the Kungliga tennishallen in Stockholm, Sweden. It was the 27th edition of the tournament and was now part of the ATP International Series of the 1995 ATP Tour, having been replaced as an ATP Masters Series venue by Essen. The tournament was held from 6 November through 12 November 1995. Second-seeded Thomas Enqvist won the singles title.

== Finals ==
=== Singles ===
(Sweden) Thomas Enqvist defeated (France) Arnaud Boetsch, 7–5, 6–4

- It was Enqvist's 5th singles title of the year and 7th of his career.

=== Doubles ===
(Netherlands) Jacco Eltingh / (Netherlands) Paul Haarhuis defeated (Canada) Grant Connell / (United States) Patrick Galbraith, 3–6, 6–2, 7–6
