= 1996 India Open – Doubles =

Doubles
- 1996 India Open

Final
- Champions: (Sweden) Jonas Björkman (Sweden) Nicklas Kulti
- Runners-up: (Zimbabwe) Byron Black (Australia) Sandon Stolle
- Score: 4–6, 6–4, 6–4

Details
- Draw: 16
- Seeds: 4

Events
Singles	Doubles
Maharashtra Open	· 1997 →

Jonas Björkman and Nicklas Kulti won in the final 4–6, 6–4, 6–4 against Byron Black and Sandon Stolle.

== Seeds ==
1. (Zimbabwe) Byron Black / (Australia) Sandon Stolle (final)
2. (Sweden) Jonas Björkman / (Sweden) Nicklas Kulti (champions)
3. (Switzerland) Jakob Hlasek / (Sweden) Anders Järryd (semifinals)
4. (South Africa) Wayne Ferreira / (South Africa) Gary Muller (semifinals)

== Draw ==
=== Key ===
- Q = Qualifier
- WC = Wild card
- LL = Lucky loser
- Alt = Alternate
- SE = Special exempt
- PR = Protected ranking
- ITF = ITF entry
- JE = Junior exempt
- w/o = Walkover
- r = Retired
- d = Defaulted
- SR = Special ranking

First round
1	(Zimbabwe) B Black (Australia) S Stolle	6	7
WC	(India) A Ismail (India) G Natekar	4	5
(United States) L Jensen (United States) M Jensen	6	6	5
(Germany) P Baur (Netherlands) J Winnink	4	7	7
4	(South Africa) W Ferreira (South Africa) G Muller	6	7
WC	(Belgium) D Norman (United Kingdom) A Richardson	4	5
(United Kingdom) T Henman (United Kingdom) C Wilkinson	4	2
Q	(Germany) A Rădulescu (Belgium) J van Herck	6	6
WC	(France) J Golmard (France) L Roux	6	6
(Italy) C Caratti (Kenya) P Wekesa	3	4
(India) M Bhupathi (India) L Paes	1	2
3	(Switzerland) J Hlasek (Sweden) A Järryd	6	6
(United Kingdom) M Petchey (United Kingdom) D Sapsford	2	1^{r}
(Netherlands) S Groen (Sweden) M Norman	6	0
(South Africa) C Ferreira (France) J-P Fleurian	3	3
2	(Sweden) J Björkman (Sweden) N Kulti	6	6

Quarterfinals
1	(Zimbabwe) B Black (Australia) S Stolle	6	6
(Germany) P Baur (Netherlands) J Winnink	2	2
4	(South Africa) W Ferreira (South Africa) G Muller	7	6
Q	(Germany) A Rădulescu (Belgium) J van Herck	5	4
WC	(France) J Golmard (France) L Roux	7	2	4
3	(Switzerland) J Hlasek (Sweden) A Järryd	6	6	6
(Netherlands) S Groen (Sweden) M Norman	0	3
2	(Sweden) J Björkman (Sweden) N Kulti	6	6

Semifinals
1	(Zimbabwe) B Black (Australia) S Stolle	6	6
4	(South Africa) W Ferreira (South Africa) G Muller	2	3
3	(Switzerland) J Hlasek (Sweden) A Järryd	7	2	2
2	(Sweden) J Björkman (Sweden) N Kulti	6	6	6

Final
1	(Zimbabwe) B Black (Australia) S Stolle	6	4	4
2	(Sweden) J Björkman (Sweden) N Kulti	4	6	6
