= 1995 Stockholm Open – Singles =

Singles
- 1995 Stockholm Open

Final
- Champion: (Sweden) Thomas Enqvist
- Runner-up: (France) Arnaud Boetsch
- Score: 7–5, 6–4

Details
- Draw: 32
- Seeds: 8

Events
Singles	Doubles
← 1994 ·	Stockholm Open	· 1996 →

Boris Becker was the defending champion, but did not participate this year.

Thomas Enqvist won the tournament, beating Arnaud Boetsch in the final, 7–5, 6–4.

== Seeds ==
1. (United States) Jim Courier (quarterfinals)
2. (Sweden) Thomas Enqvist (champion)
3. (Netherlands) Richard Krajicek (second round)
4. (Sweden) Magnus Larsson (quarterfinals)
5. (France) Arnaud Boetsch (final)
6. (United States) Todd Martin (second round)
7. (Netherlands) Paul Haarhuis (first round)
8. (Sweden) Stefan Edberg (quarterfinals)

== Draw ==
=== Key ===
- Q = Qualifier
- WC = Wild card
- LL = Lucky loser
- Alt = Alternate
- SE = Special exempt
- PR = Protected ranking
- ITF = ITF entry
- JE = Junior exempt
- w/o = Walkover
- r = Retired
- d = Defaulted
- SR = Special ranking

=== Finals ===
Semifinals
(Germany) David Prinosil	1	6	5
5	(France) Arnaud Boetsch	6	1	7
(United States) Richey Reneberg	2	1
2	(Sweden) Thomas Enqvist	6	6

Final
5	(France) Arnaud Boetsch	5	4
2	(Sweden) Thomas Enqvist	7	6

=== Top half ===
First round
1	(United States) J Courier	6	6
(Australia) M Tebbutt	0	2
WC	(Sweden) M Gustafsson	6	1	4
(Australia) T Woodbridge	4	6	6
(United States) D Wheaton	4	4
(Germany) D Prinosil	6	6
(France) O Delaître	6	7^{7}
7	(Netherlands) P Haarhuis	2	6^{3}
3	(Netherlands) R Krajicek	7^{7}	5	7
(United Kingdom) G Rusedski	6^{3}	7	5
Q	(Sweden) M Tillström	6	7^{7}
(Sweden) M Wilander	3	6^{2}
(Denmark) K Carlsen	4	6	2
WC	(Sweden) H Holm	6	3	6
(United States) P McEnroe	5	6	6^{3}
5	(France) A Boetsch	7	2	7^{7}

Second round
1	(United States) J Courier	6	6
(Australia) T Woodbridge	4	3
(Germany) D Prinosil	6	6
(France) O Delaître	4	3
3	(Netherlands) R Krajicek	6^{7}	6	3
Q	(Sweden) M Tillström	7^{9}	2	6
WC	(Sweden) H Holm	6	2	6^{5}
5	(France) A Boetsch	2	6	7^{7}

Quarterfinals
1	(United States) J Courier	3	6^{4}
(Germany) D Prinosil	6	7^{7}
Q	(Sweden) M Tillström	5	4
5	(France) A Boetsch	7	6

Semifinals
(Germany) D Prinosil	1	6	5
5	(France) A Boetsch	6	1	7

=== Bottom half ===
First round
6	(United States) T Martin	6^{4}	6	6
(Czech Republic) M Damm	7^{7}	3	3
(Australia) M Woodforde	2	5
(United States) R Reneberg	6	7
(Netherlands) J Eltingh	5	3
(Sweden) J Björkman	7	6
(Sweden) A Järryd	1	4
4	(Sweden) M Larsson	6	6
8	(Sweden) S Edberg	6	6
(United States) J Stark	3	1
Q	(Belgium) F Dewulf	2	5
(United States) M Washington	6	7
Q	(Romania) A Pavel	6	6
WC	(Sweden) T Johansson	3	1
Q	(Germany) H Dreekmann	6^{4}	6	5
2	(Sweden) T Enqvist	7^{7}	3	7

Second round
6	(United States) T Martin	3	6^{7}
(United States) R Reneberg	6	7^{9}
(Sweden) J Björkman	7	5	5
4	(Sweden) M Larsson	5	7	7
8	(Sweden) S Edberg	6	6^{3}	6
(United States) M Washington	3	7^{7}	0
Q	(Romania) A Pavel	1	3
2	(Sweden) T Enqvist	6	6

Quarterfinals
(United States) R Reneberg	6	6
4	(Sweden) M Larsson	3	2
8	(Sweden) S Edberg	3	5
2	(Sweden) T Enqvist	6	7

Semifinals
(United States) R Reneberg	2	1
2	(Sweden) T Enqvist	6	6
