= 1998 ABN AMRO World Tennis Tournament – Doubles =

Doubles
- 1998 ABN AMRO World Tennis Tournament

Final
- Champions: (Netherlands) Jacco Eltingh (Netherlands) Paul Haarhuis
- Runners-up: (United Kingdom) Neil Broad (South Africa) Piet Norval
- Score: 7–6, 6–3

Details
- Draw: 16 (3WC/1Q)
- Seeds: 4

Events
Singles	Doubles
- Rotterdam Open

Following are the results of the 1998 ABN AMRO World Tennis Tournament doubles competition. The 1998 ABN AMRO World Tennis Tournament was a tennis tournament played on indoor carpet courts. It was the 26th edition of the event known that year as the ABN AMRO World Tennis Tournament, and was part of the ATP International Series of the 1998 ATP Tour. It took place at the Rotterdam Ahoy indoor sporting arena in Rotterdam, Netherlands, from March 2 through March 18, 1998.

Jacco Eltingh and Paul Haarhuis were the defending champions, and won in the final 7–6, 6–3, against Neil Broad and Piet Norval.

== Seeds ==
1. (Netherlands) Jacco Eltingh / (Netherlands) Paul Haarhuis (champions)
2. (United Kingdom) Neil Broad / (South Africa) Piet Norval (final)
3. (Czech Republic) Martin Damm / (Czech Republic) Jiří Novák (semifinals)
4. (Australia) Joshua Eagle / (Australia) Andrew Florent (first round)

== Draw ==
Key

- Q = Qualifier
- WC = Wild card
- LL = Lucky loser
- Alt = Alternate
- ITF = ITF entry
- PR = Protected ranking
- SR = Special ranking
- SE = Special exempt
- JE = Junior exempt
- JR = Junior Accelerator Programme entrant
- CO = College Accelerator Programme entrant
- NG = Next Gen Accelerator Program entrant
- w/o = Walkover
- r = Retired
- d = Defaulted

=== Draw ===
First round
1	(Netherlands) J Eltingh (Netherlands) P Haarhuis	6	6
(Sweden) N Kulti (Sweden) M Tillström	4	3
WC	(Netherlands) J Siemerink (New Zealand) B Steven	6	6
(North Macedonia) A Kitinov (Czech Republic) P Vízner	7	7
3	(Czech Republic) M Damm (Czech Republic) J Novák	6	3	6
(South Africa) D Adams (France) O Delaître	2	6	4
(Belgium) L Pimek (Netherlands) F Wibier	4	4
Q	(Netherlands) T Kempers (Netherlands) M Oosting	6	6
WC	(Netherlands) S Noteboom (Netherlands) J van Lottum	3	7	5
(Argentina) P Albano (Sweden) P Nyborg	6	6	7
(Spain) T Carbonell (Spain) F Roig	6	6
4	(Australia) J Eagle (Australia) A Florent	1	3
WC	(Netherlands) R Sluiter (Netherlands) P Wessels	7	7
(Australia) A Kratzmann (Russia) A Olhovskiy	6	6
(Germany) M-K Goellner (Germany) D Prinosil	6	4
2	(United Kingdom) N Broad (South Africa) P Norval	7	6

Quarterfinals
1	(Netherlands) J Eltingh (Netherlands) P Haarhuis	6	6
(North Macedonia) A Kitinov (Czech Republic) P Vízner	3	3
3	(Czech Republic) M Damm (Czech Republic) J Novák	6	6
Q	(Netherlands) T Kempers (Netherlands) M Oosting	2	4
(Argentina) P Albano (Sweden) P Nyborg	4	4
(Spain) T Carbonell (Spain) F Roig	6	6
WC	(Netherlands) R Sluiter (Netherlands) P Wessels	4	6
2	(United Kingdom) N Broad (South Africa) P Norval	6	7

Semifinals
1	(Netherlands) J Eltingh (Netherlands) P Haarhuis	5	6	6
3	(Czech Republic) M Damm (Czech Republic) J Novák	7	3	4
(Spain) T Carbonell (Spain) F Roig	3	3
2	(United Kingdom) N Broad (South Africa) P Norval	6	6

Final
1	(Netherlands) J Eltingh (Netherlands) P Haarhuis	7	6
2	(United Kingdom) N Broad (South Africa) P Norval	6	3

== Qualifying ==
=== Qualifying seeds ===
1. (Netherlands) Tom Kempers / (Netherlands) Menno Oosting (qualified)
2. (Morocco) Karim Alami / (Belgium) Tom Vanhoudt (qualifying competition, withdrew)

=== Qualifiers ===
1. (Netherlands) Tom Kempers / (Netherlands) Menno Oosting

=== Qualifying draw ===
First round
1	(Netherlands) Tom Kempers (Netherlands) Menno Oosting	6	2	7
WC	(Netherlands) Tom Nijssen (Netherlands) Dennis van Scheppingen	3	6	6
(France) Nicolas Escudé (France) Guillaume Raoux	3	2
2	(Morocco) Karim Alami (Belgium) Tom Vanhoudt	6	6

Qualifying competition
1	(Netherlands) Tom Kempers (Netherlands) Menno Oosting	w/o
2	(Morocco) Karim Alami (Belgium) Tom Vanhoudt
