= 1996 India Open =

- Date: 8–14 April
- Edition: 1st
- Category: World Series
- Draw: 32S / 16D
- Prize money: $405,000
- Surface: Hard / outdoor
- Location: New Delhi, India

Champions

Singles
- (Sweden) Thomas Enqvist

Doubles
- (Sweden) Jonas Björkman / (Sweden) Nicklas Kulti
Maharashtra Open	· 1997 →

The 1996 India Open was a men's tennis tournament played on outdoor hard courts in New Delhi in India and was part of the World Series of the 1996 ATP Tour. It was the inaugural edition of the tournament and took place from 8 April through 14 April 1996. First-seeded Thomas Enqvist won the singles title.

== Finals ==
=== Singles ===
(Sweden) Thomas Enqvist defeated (Zimbabwe) Byron Black 6–2, 7–6^{(7–3)}

- It was Enqvist's 1st title of the year and the 8th of his career.

=== Doubles ===
(Sweden) Jonas Björkman / (Sweden) Nicklas Kulti defeated (Zimbabwe) Byron Black / (Australia) Sandon Stolle 4–6, 6–4, 6–4

- It was Björkman's 2nd title of the year and the 12th of his career. It was Kulti's 2nd title of the year and the 7th of his career.
