= Sandeep Kirtane =

Indian tennis player

- Country (sports): India
- Born: 27 October 1973 (age 51); Pune, Maharashtra, India

Singles
- Career titles: 0
- Highest ranking: No. 564

Doubles
- Career titles: 0
- Highest ranking: No. 289
- Last updated on: 2 March 2018.

Sandeep Kirtane (born 27 October 1973) is an Indian professional tennis player. He made his ATP Tour debut at the 1996 India Open, where he lost in the 1st round to Sandon Stolle.
