= 1996 ABN AMRO World Tennis Tournament – Singles =

Singles
- 1996 ABN AMRO World Tennis Tournament

Final
- Champion: (Croatia) Goran Ivanišević
- Runner-up: (Russia) Yevgeny Kafelnikov
- Score: 6–4, 3–6, 6–3

Details
- Draw: 32
- Seeds: 8

Events
Singles	Doubles
← 1995 ·	ABN AMRO World Tennis Tournament	· 1997 →

Richard Krajicek was the defending champion but lost in the second round to Cédric Pioline.

Goran Ivanišević won in the final 6–4, 3–6, 6–3 against Yevgeny Kafelnikov.

== Seeds ==
A champion seed is indicated in bold text while text in italics indicates the round in which that seed was eliminated.

1. (United States) Pete Sampras (quarterfinals)
2. (Croatia) **Goran Ivanišević (champion)**
3. (Russia) Yevgeny Kafelnikov (final)
4. (Switzerland) Marc Rosset (quarterfinals)
5. (France) Arnaud Boetsch (second round)
6. (Netherlands) Richard Krajicek (second round)
7. (Netherlands) Jan Siemerink (first round)
8. (Czech Republic) Bohdan Ulihrach (first round)

== Draw ==
=== Key ===
- Q = Qualifier
- WC = Wild card
- LL = Lucky loser
- Alt = Alternate
- ITF = ITF entry
- PR = Protected ranking
- SR = Special ranking
- SE = Special exempt
- JE = Junior exempt
- JR = Junior Accelerator Programme entrant
- CO = College Accelerator Programme entrant
- NG = Next Gen Accelerator Program entrant
- w/o = Walkover
- r = Retired
- d = Defaulted

First round
1	(United States) **P Sampras**	**6**	3	**7**
(Spain) T Carbonell	1	**6**	5
(Switzerland) **J Hlasek**	**7^{7}**	**6**
(Czech Republic) D Vacek	6^{5}	4
(Germany) M Sinner	3	6^{4}
(Spain) **C Moyá**	**6**	**7^{7}**
Q	(United Kingdom) **T Henman**	**7^{8}**	**7^{11}**
7	(Netherlands) J Siemerink	6^{6}	6^{9}
3	(Russia) **Y Kafelnikov**	**6**	**7^{7}**
(France) G Forget	3	6^{5}
Q	(Russia) A Olhovskiy	6^{5}	6^{4}
(Netherlands) **J Eltingh**	**7^{7}**	**7^{7}**
(France) **C Pioline**	**6**	**6**
(Morocco) K Alami	3	4
(Netherlands) P Haarhuis	3	6^{7}
6	(Netherlands) **R Krajicek**	**6**	**7^{9}**
5	(France) **A Boetsch**	**7^{9}**	**7**
WC	(Netherlands) D van Scheppingen	6^{7}	5
(France) **G Raoux**	**6**	**6**
(Czech Republic) C Doseděl	3	3
(Germany) **D Prinosil**	6^{7}	**6**	**6**
WC	(Netherlands) H J Davids	**7^{9}**	3	3
WC	(Netherlands) J van Lottum	2	3
4	(Switzerland) **M Rosset**	**6**	**6**
8	(Czech Republic) B Ulihrach	6^{5}	6^{3}
(Czech Republic) **M Damm**	**7^{7}**	**7^{7}**
Q	(Germany) P Baur	5	6^{4}
(Germany) **C-U Steeb**	**7**	**7^{7}**
Q	(Italy) **O Camporese**	**7^{7}**	**6**
(United States) J Tarango	6^{4}	3
(Belgium) F Dewulf	6^{2}	5
2	(Croatia) **G Ivanišević**	**7^{7}**	**7**

Second round
1	(United States) **P Sampras**	6^{6}	**6**	**6**
(Switzerland) J Hlasek	**7^{8}**	4	4
(Spain) C Moyá	6^{3}	4
Q	(United Kingdom) **T Henman**	**7^{7}**	**6**
3	(Russia) **Y Kafelnikov**	**6**	**6**
(Netherlands) J Eltingh	4	2
(France) **C Pioline**	**7^{7}**	**6**
6	(Netherlands) R Krajicek	6^{5}	3
5	(France) A Boetsch	4	2
(France) **G Raoux**	**6**	**6**
(Germany) D Prinosil	5	**7^{7}**	1
4	(Switzerland) **M Rosset**	**7**	6^{5}	**6**
(Czech Republic) **M Damm**	6^{3}	**6**	**7^{8}**
(Germany) C-U Steeb	**7^{7}**	4	6^{6}
Q	(Italy) O Camporese	3	1
2	(Croatia) **G Ivanišević**	**6**	**6**

Quarterfinals
1	(United States) P Sampras
Q	(United Kingdom) **T Henman**	**w/o**
3	(Russia) **Y Kafelnikov**	3	**7^{7}**	**6**
(France) C Pioline	**6**	6^{4}	4
(France) **G Raoux**	**7^{12}**	**6**
4	(Switzerland) M Rosset	6^{10}	4
(Czech Republic) M Damm	5	2
2	(Croatia) **G Ivanišević**	**7**	**6**

Semifinals
Q	(United Kingdom) T Henman	6^{4}	3
3	(Russia) **Y Kafelnikov**	**7^{7}**	**6**
(France) G Raoux	4	4
2	(Croatia) **G Ivanišević**	**6**	**6**

Final
3	(Russia) Yevgeny Kafelnikov	4	**6**	3
2	(Croatia) **Goran Ivanišević**	**6**	3	**6**
