= 1997 Marseille Open – Singles =

Singles
- 1997 Marseille Open

Final
- Champion: (Sweden) Thomas Enqvist
- Runner-up: (Chile) Marcelo Ríos
- Score: 6–4, 1–0 (Ríos retired)

Details
- Draw: 32 (4 Q / 3 WC )
- Seeds: 8

Events
Singles	Doubles
← 1996 ·	Open 13	· 1998 →

Guy Forget was the defending champion but did not compete that year.

Thomas Enqvist won the final 6–4, 1–0 after Marcelo Ríos was forced to retire.

== Seeds ==
1. (Chile) Marcelo Ríos (final, retired)
2. (Sweden) Thomas Enqvist (champion)
3. (Germany) Michael Stich (first round)
4. (Switzerland) Marc Rosset (quarterfinals)
5. (France) Cédric Pioline (first round)
6. (Czech Republic) Petr Korda (second round)
7. (Spain) Francisco Clavet (first round)
8. (Germany) Hendrik Dreekmann (quarterfinals)

== Draw ==
=== Key ===
- Q = Qualifier
- WC = Wild card
- LL = Lucky loser
- Alt = Alternate
- ITF = ITF entry
- PR = Protected ranking
- SR = Special ranking
- SE = Special exempt
- JE = Junior exempt
- JR = Junior Accelerator Programme entrant
- CO = College Accelerator Programme entrant
- NG = Next Gen Accelerator Program entrant
- w/o = Walkover
- r = Retired
- d = Defaulted

=== Finals ===
Semifinals
1	(Chile) Marcelo Ríos	6	6^{4}	6
(Spain) Sergi Bruguera	3	7^{7}	4
WC	(France) Fabrice Santoro	4	3
2	(Sweden) Thomas Enqvist	6	6

Final
1	(Chile) Marcelo Ríos	4	0^{r}
2	(Sweden) Thomas Enqvist	6	1

=== Top half ===
First round
1	(Chile) M Ríos	7^{7}	6
(Spain) J A Viloca	6^{4}	4
(Belgium) J van Herck	6	6
(Belgium) F Dewulf	4	4
(Slovakia) K Kučera	1	1
Q	(France) A Clément	6	6
(Sweden) M Larsson	2	6	6
7	(Spain) F Clavet	6	4	3
3	(Germany) M Stich	4	2
(Czech Republic) D Vacek	6	6
Q	(France) O Delaître	6	2	4
(Russia) A Chesnokov	4	6	6
(France) L Roux	6	2	6
(Russia) A Olhovskiy	1	6	4
(Spain) S Bruguera	6	6^{9}	6
5	(France) C Pioline	1	7^{11}	1

Second round
1	(Chile) M Ríos	6	6
(Belgium) J van Herck	2	4
Q	(France) A Clément	3	1
(Sweden) M Larsson	6	6
(Czech Republic) D Vacek	3	3
(Russia) A Chesnokov	6	6
(France) L Roux	6	3	2
(Spain) S Bruguera	4	6	6

Quarterfinals
1	(Chile) M Ríos	3	7	6
(Sweden) M Larsson	6	5	4
(Russia) A Chesnokov	3	2
(Spain) S Bruguera	6	6

Semifinals
1	(Chile) M Ríos	6	6^{4}	6
(Spain) S Bruguera	3	7^{7}	4

=== Bottom half ===
First round
6	(Czech Republic) P Korda	6	4	7^{7}
Q	(Spain) F Roig	4	6	6^{4}
WC	(France) S Grosjean	4	7	1
WC	(France) F Santoro	6	5	6
Q	(Belarus) M Mirnyi	2	4
(Sweden) N Kulti	6	6
(Austria) G Schaller	1	4
4	(Switzerland) M Rosset	6	6
8	(Germany) H Dreekmann	6	3
WC	(France) T Champion	2	1^{r}
(Sweden) M Tillström	6	1	0
(Spain) T Carbonell	3	6	6
(France) S Simian	6^{5}	7^{7}	6^{1}
(Slovakia) D Hrbatý	7^{7}	6^{4}	7^{7}
(Sweden) P Fredriksson	1	2
2	(Sweden) T Enqvist	6	6

Second round
6	(Czech Republic) P Korda	4	4
WC	(France) F Santoro	6	6
(Sweden) N Kulti	3	6^{3}
4	(Switzerland) M Rosset	6	7^{7}
8	(Germany) H Dreekmann	1	7	6
(Spain) T Carbonell	6	5	1
(Slovakia) D Hrbatý	3	2
2	(Sweden) T Enqvist	6	6

Quarterfinals
WC	(France) F Santoro	3	6	7
4	(Switzerland) M Rosset	6	3	5
8	(Germany) H Dreekmann	4	6	1
2	(Sweden) T Enqvist	6	3	6

Semifinals
WC	(France) F Santoro	4	3
2	(Sweden) T Enqvist	6	6
