= 1996 ABN AMRO World Tennis Tournament =

- Date: 4–10 March
- Edition: 24th
- Category: ATP World Series
- Draw: 32S / 16D
- Prize money: $725,000
- Surface: Carpet / indoor
- Location: Rotterdam, Netherlands
- Venue: Rotterdam Ahoy

Champions

Singles
- (Croatia) Goran Ivanišević

Doubles
- (South Africa) David Adams / (South Africa) Marius Barnard
- ABN AMRO World Tennis Tournament

The 1996 ABN AMRO World Tennis Tournament was a men's tennis tournament played on indoor carpet courts at Rotterdam Ahoy in the Netherlands. It was part of the World Series of the 1996 ATP Tour. The tournament ran from 4 March 4 through 10 March 1996. Goran Ivanišević won the singles title.

The singles draw featured world No. 1, reigning Wimbledon and US Open champion and recent San Jose and Memphis titlist Pete Sampras, Zagreb, Dubai and Milan winner Goran Ivanišević and Australian Open quarterfinalist and Adelaide champion Yevgeny Kafelnikov. Also competing were Milan runner-up Marc Rosset, 1995 Stockholm finalist Arnaud Boetsch, Richard Krajicek, Jan Siemerink and Bohdan Ulihrach.

== Finals ==
=== Men's singles ===
(Croatia) Goran Ivanišević defeated (Russia) Yevgeny Kafelnikov 6–4, 3–6, 6–3

- It was Ivanisevic's 5th title of the year and the 23rd of his career.

=== Men's doubles ===
(South Africa) David Adams / (South Africa) Marius Barnard defeated (Netherlands) Hendrik Jan Davids / (Czech Republic) Cyril Suk 6–3, 5–7, 7–6

- It was Adams' only title of the year and the 9th of his career. It was Barnard's 1st title of the year and the 3rd of his career.
