= 1996 Stockholm Open =

- Date: 4–10 November
- Edition: 28th
- Category: World Series
- Draw: 32S / 16D
- Prize money: $800,000
- Location: Stockholm, Sweden
- Venue: Kungliga tennishallen

Champions

Singles
- (Sweden) Thomas Enqvist

Doubles
- (United States) Patrick Galbraith / (United States) Jonathan Stark
← 1995 ·	Stockholm Open	· 1997 →

The 1996 Stockholm Open was a men's tennis tournament played on indoor carpet courts at the Kungliga tennishallen in Stockholm, Sweden and was part of the World Series of the 1996 ATP Tour. It was the 28th edition of the tournament and was held from 4 November until 10 November 1996. Third-seeded Thomas Enqvist won his second consecutive singles title at the event.

== Finals ==
=== Singles ===
(Sweden) Thomas Enqvist defeated (United States) Todd Martin 7–5, 6–4, 7–6^{(7–0)}

- It was Enqvist's 3rd singles title of the year and the 10th of his career.

=== Doubles ===
(United States) Patrick Galbraith / (United States) Jonathan Stark defeated (United States) Todd Martin / (United States) Chris Woodruff 7–6, 6–4

- It was Galbraith's 5th title of the year and the 29th of his career. It was Stark's 2nd title of the year and the 17th of his career.
