= 1997 ABN AMRO World Tennis Tournament – Doubles =

Doubles
- 1997 ABN AMRO World Tennis Tournament
- 1996 Champions: (South Africa) David Adams (South Africa) Marius Barnard

Final
- Champions: (Netherlands) Jacco Eltingh (Netherlands) Paul Haarhuis
- Runners-up: (Belgium) Libor Pimek (South Africa) Byron Talbot
- Score: 7–6, 6–4

Details
- Draw: 16
- Seeds: 4

Events
| Singles | Doubles |
- ABN AMRO World Tennis Tournament

David Adams and Marius Barnard were the defending champions but they competed with different partners that year, Adams with Olivier Delaître and Barnard with Piet Norval.

Barnard and Norval lost in the first round to Hendrik Jan Davids and Menno Oosting.

Adams and Delaître lost in the quarterfinals to Libor Pimek and Byron Talbot.

Jacco Eltingh and Paul Haarhuis won in the final 7–6, 6–4 against Pimek and Talbot.

== Seeds ==
Champion seeds are indicated in bold text while text in italics indicates the round in which those seeds were eliminated.

1. (Netherlands) **Jacco Eltingh** / (Netherlands) **Paul Haarhuis (champions)**
2. (Netherlands) Jan Siemerink / (Czech Republic) Daniel Vacek (first round)
3. (Belgium) Libor Pimek / (South Africa) Byron Talbot (final)
4. (Czech Republic) Martin Damm / (Russia) Andrei Olhovskiy (semifinals)

== Draw ==
Key

- Q = Qualifier
- WC = Wild card
- LL = Lucky loser
- Alt = Alternate
- ITF = ITF entry
- PR = Protected ranking
- SR = Special ranking
- SE = Special exempt
- JE = Junior exempt
- JR = Junior Accelerator Programme entrant
- CO = College Accelerator Programme entrant
- NG = Next Gen Accelerator Program entrant
- w/o = Walkover
- r = Retired
- d = Defaulted

First round
1 | (Netherlands) **J Eltingh** (Netherlands) **P Haarhuis** | **6** | **6**
(Argentina) P Albano (Sweden) P Nyborg | 4 | 2
WC | (Netherlands) **R Krajicek** (Netherlands) **F Wibier** | **7** | **6**
WC | (Germany) D Prinosil (Germany) M Stich | 5 | 4
4 | (Czech Republic) **M Damm** (Russia) **A Olhovskiy** | **6** | **6**
WC | (Netherlands) R Wassen (Netherlands) J Winnink | 3 | 1
(Spain) **T Carbonell** (Spain) **F Roig** | **6** | **6**
(South Africa) J-L de Jager (United States) M Keil | 3 | 3
(Netherlands) S Noteboom (France) G Raoux | 5 | 6
(South Africa) **D Adams** (France) **O Delaître** | **7** | **7**
Q | (Germany) K Braasch (Germany) M Huning | 6 | 5
3 | (Belgium) **L Pimek** (South Africa) **B Talbot** | **7** | **7**
(Netherlands) **H J Davids** (Netherlands) **M Oosting** | **6** | **6**
(South Africa) M Barnard (South Africa) P Norval | 3 | 4
(Netherlands) **T Kempers** (Netherlands) **T Nijssen** | **7** | **7**
2 | (Netherlands) J Siemerink (Czech Republic) D Vacek | 6 | 6

Quarterfinals
1 | (Netherlands) **J Eltingh** (Netherlands) **P Haarhuis** | **7** | **6**
WC | (Netherlands) R Krajicek (Netherlands) F Wibier | 6 | 4
4 | (Czech Republic) **M Damm** (Russia) **A Olhovskiy** | **7** | **6**
(Spain) T Carbonell (Spain) F Roig | 6 | 4
(South Africa) D Adams (France) O Delaître | 4 | **7** | 6
3 | (Belgium) **L Pimek** (South Africa) **B Talbot** | **6** | 6 | **7**
(Netherlands) H J Davids (Netherlands) M Oosting | 3 | 4
(Netherlands) **T Kempers** (Netherlands) **T Nijssen** | **6** | **6**

Semifinals
1 | (Netherlands) **J Eltingh** (Netherlands) **P Haarhuis** | **6** | 3 | **6**
4 | (Czech Republic) M Damm (Russia) A Olhovskiy | 3 | **6** | 3
3 | (Belgium) **L Pimek** (South Africa) **B Talbot** | **6** | **6**
(Netherlands) T Kempers (Netherlands) T Nijssen | 4 | 1

Final
1 | (Netherlands) **Jacco Eltingh** (Netherlands) **Paul Haarhuis** | **7** | **6**
3 | (Belgium) Libor Pimek (South Africa) Byron Talbot | 6 | 4
