= 1996 ABN AMRO World Tennis Tournament – Doubles =

Doubles
- 1996 ABN AMRO World Tennis Tournament
- 1995 Champions: (Czech Republic) Martin Damm (Sweden) Anders Järryd

Final
- Champions: (South Africa) David Adams (South Africa) Marius Barnard
- Runners-up: (Netherlands) Hendrik Jan Davids (Czech Republic) Cyril Suk
- Score: 6–3, 5–7, 7–6

Details
- Draw: 16
- Seeds: 4

Events
Singles	Doubles
- ABN AMRO World Tennis Tournament

Martin Damm and Anders Järryd were the defending champions but lost in the quarterfinals to Peter Nyborg and Libor Pimek.

David Adams and Marius Barnard won in the final 6–3, 5–7, 7–6 against Hendrik Jan Davids and Cyril Suk.

== Seeds ==
Champion seeds are indicated in bold text while text in italics indicates the round in which those seeds were eliminated.

1. (Netherlands) Jacco Eltingh / (Netherlands) Paul Haarhuis (first round)
2. (Russia) Yevgeny Kafelnikov / (Russia) Andrei Olhovskiy (first round)
3. (Netherlands) Menno Oosting / (Czech Republic) Daniel Vacek (first round)
4. (Netherlands) Hendrik Jan Davids / (Czech Republic) Cyril Suk (final)

== Draw ==
Key

- Q = Qualifier
- WC = Wild card
- LL = Lucky loser
- Alt = Alternate
- ITF = ITF entry
- PR = Protected ranking
- SR = Special ranking
- SE = Special exempt
- JE = Junior exempt
- JR = Junior Accelerator Programme entrant
- CO = College Accelerator Programme entrant
- NG = Next Gen Accelerator Program entrant
- w/o = Walkover
- r = Retired
- d = Defaulted

First round
1	(Netherlands) J Eltingh (Netherlands) P Haarhuis	4	6
Q	(Australia) **W Arthurs** (Australia) **A Kratzmann**	**6**	**7**
(United States) **M Keil** (United States) **J Tarango**	**w/o**
(Germany) D Prinosil (South Africa) B Talbot
4	(Netherlands) **H J Davids** (Czech Republic) **C Suk**	**6**	**7**
WC	(Netherlands) T Kempers (Netherlands) J van Lottum	2	5
(United Kingdom) **N Broad** (South Africa) **P Norval**	**7**	**7**
(South Africa) J-L de Jager (South Africa) W Ferreira	6	6
(Sweden) **P Nyborg** (Belgium) **L Pimek**	**6**	**6**
(France) R Gilbert (France) G Raoux	2	2
(Czech Republic) **M Damm** (Sweden) **A Järryd**	**7**	**6**
3	(Netherlands) M Oosting (Czech Republic) D Vacek	6	2
WC	(Netherlands) R Sluiter (Netherlands) P Wessels	3	2
LL	(South Africa) **D Adams** (South Africa) **M Barnard**	**6**	**6**
(Spain) **T Carbonell** (Spain) **F Roig**	4	**6**	**7**
2	(Russia) Y Kafelnikov (Russia) A Olhovskiy	**6**	4	6

Quarterfinals
Q	(Australia) **W Arthurs** (Australia) **A Kratzmann**	**6**	**6**
(United States) M Keil (United States) J Tarango	4	4
4	(Netherlands) **H J Davids** (Czech Republic) **C Suk**	**6**	1	**6**
(United Kingdom) N Broad (South Africa) P Norval	4	**6**	3
(Sweden) **P Nyborg** (Belgium) **L Pimek**	**6**	**6**
(Czech Republic) M Damm (Sweden) A Järryd	4	4
LL	(South Africa) **D Adams** (South Africa) **M Barnard**	**6**	6	**6**
(Spain) T Carbonell (Spain) F Roig	4	**7**	3

Semifinals
Q	(Australia) W Arthurs (Australia) A Kratzmann	**6**	2	3
4	(Netherlands) **H J Davids** (Czech Republic) **C Suk**	4	**6**	**6**
(Sweden) P Nyborg (Belgium) L Pimek	4	**6**	4
LL	(South Africa) **D Adams** (South Africa) **M Barnard**	**6**	4	**6**

Final
4	(Netherlands) H J Davids (Czech Republic) C Suk	3	**7**	6
LL	(South Africa) **D Adams** (South Africa) **M Barnard**	**6**	5	**7**
