= 1997 Marseille Open =

- Date: 10–16 February
- Edition: 5th
- Category: ATP World Series
- Draw: 32S / 16D
- Prize money: $514,250
- Surface: Hard / indoor
- Location: Marseille, France
- Venue: Palais des Sports de Marseille

Champions

Singles
- (Sweden) Thomas Enqvist

Doubles
- (Sweden) Thomas Enqvist / (Sweden) Magnus Larsson
- Marseille Open

The 1997 Marseille Open was a men's tennis tournament played on indoor hard courts at the Palais des Sports de Marseille in Marseille, France, and was part of the World Series of the 1997 ATP Tour. The tournament ran from 10 February through 16 February 1997. Second-seeded Thomas Enqvist won the singles title.

== Finals ==
=== Singles ===
(Sweden) Thomas Enqvist defeated (Chile) Marcelo Ríos 6–4, 1–0 (Ríos retired)

- It was Enqvist's 1st title of the year and the 11th of his career.

=== Doubles ===
(Sweden) Thomas Enqvist / (Sweden) Magnus Larsson defeated (France) Olivier Delaître / (France) Fabrice Santoro 6–3, 6–4

- It was Enqvist's 2nd title of the year and the 12th of his career. It was Larsson's only title of the year and the 11th of his career.
