= 1998 Open 13 – Singles =

Singles
- 1998 Open 13

Final
- Champion: (Sweden) Thomas Enqvist
- Runner-up: (Russia) Yevgeny Kafelnikov
- Score: 6–4, 6–1

Details
- Draw: 32 (4 Q / 3 WC )
- Seeds: 8

Events
Singles	Doubles
← 1997 ·	Open 13	· 1999 →

Thomas Enqvist defeated Yevgeny Kafelnikov 6–4, 6–1 to win the 1998 Open 13 singles competition. Enqvist was the defending champion.

== Seeds ==
1. (Russia) Yevgeny Kafelnikov (final)
2. (Netherlands) Richard Krajicek (semifinals)
3. (Spain) Sergi Bruguera (second round)
4. (Brazil) Gustavo Kuerten (second round)
5. (France) Cédric Pioline (first round)
6. (Sweden) Thomas Enqvist (champion)
7. (Spain) Albert Portas (second round)
8. (Spain) Julian Alonso (second round)

== Draw ==
=== Key ===
- Q = Qualifier
- WC = Wild card
- LL = Lucky loser
- Alt = Alternate
- ITF = ITF entry
- PR = Protected ranking
- SR = Special ranking
- SE = Special exempt
- JE = Junior exempt
- JR = Junior Accelerator Programme entrant
- CO = College Accelerator Programme entrant
- NG = Next Gen Accelerator Program entrant
- w/o = Walkover
- r = Retired
- d = Defaulted

=== Finals ===
Semifinals
1	(Russia) Yevgeny Kafelnikov	7^{7}	6
(Sweden) Mikael Tillström	6^{5}	4
6	(Sweden) Thomas Enqvist	6	6^{1}	6
2	(Netherlands) Richard Krajicek	3	7^{7}	3

Final
1	(Russia) Yevgeny Kafelnikov	4	1
6	(Sweden) Thomas Enqvist	6	6

=== Top half ===
First round
1	(Russia) Y Kafelnikov	6	6
(Spain) J A Viloca	4	3
Q	(Romania) A Voinea	7^{7}	6
(Norway) C Ruud	6^{2}	4
Q	(Netherlands) S Schalken	6	6^{5}	0
(France) A Clément	4	7^{7}	6
(France) L Roux	7^{7}	3	3
8	(Spain) J Alonso	6^{3}	6	6
WC/4	(Brazil) G Kuerten	6	6
(Belgium) F Dewulf	2	4
(France) A Boetsch	6	6
(Spain) A Martín	3	1
(Germany) M Goellner	7^{7}	6
(Italy) A Gaudenzi	6^{3}	2
(Sweden) M Tillström	7^{7}	3	7
5	(France) C Pioline	6^{3}	6	5

Second round
1	(Russia) Y Kafelnikov	6	3	6
Q	(Romania) A Voinea	1	6	4
(France) A Clément	6	6
8	(Spain) J Alonso	1	4
WC/4	(Brazil) G Kuerten	5	2
(France) A Boetsch	7	6
(Germany) M Goellner	5	1
(Sweden) M Tillström	7	6

Quarterfinals
1	(Russia) Y Kafelnikov	6	3	6
(France) A Clément	2	6	4
(France) A Boetsch	6	0	6^{2}
(Sweden) M Tillström	4	6	7^{7}

Semifinals
1	(Russia) Y Kafelnikov	7^{7}	6
(Sweden) M Tillström	6^{5}	4

=== Bottom half ===
First round
6	(Sweden) T Enqvist	6	6
(Spain) J Burillo	4	3
Q	(France) A di Pasquale	3	6	6^{1}
LL	(Spain) F Roig	6	3	7^{7}
(Sweden) M Gustafsson	6^{1}	6	6
(Belgium) J van Herck	7^{7}	4	2
Q	(Spain) T Carbonell	2	6	3
WC/3	(Spain) S Bruguera	6	4	6
7	(Spain) A Portas	6	6
(Spain) Á López Morón	3	3
(Sweden) T Nydahl	6^{10}	6^{4}
(Czech Republic) D Vacek	7^{12}	7^{7}
(United States) J Tarango	3	4
WC	(France) S Grosjean	6	6
(Morocco) K Alami	4	3
2	(Netherlands) R Krajicek	6	6

Second round
6	(Sweden) T Enqvist	6	6
LL	(Spain) F Roig	2	3
(Sweden) M Gustafsson	6	6
WC/3	(Spain) S Bruguera	3	3
7	(Spain) A Portas	1	2
(Czech Republic) D Vacek	6	6
WC	(France) S Grosjean	3	5^{r}
2	(Netherlands) R Krajicek	6	5

Quarterfinals
6	(Sweden) T Enqvist	6	1	6
(Sweden) M Gustafsson	2	6	3
(Czech Republic) D Vacek	6	4	4
2	(Netherlands) R Krajicek	4	6	6

Semifinals
6	(Sweden) T Enqvist	6	6^{1}	6
2	(Netherlands) R Krajicek	3	7^{7}	3
