= 1998 ABN AMRO World Tennis Tournament – Singles =

Singles
- 1998 ABN AMRO World Tennis Tournament

Final
- Champion: (Netherlands) Jan Siemerink
- Runner-up: (Sweden) Thomas Johansson
- Score: 7–6^{(7–2)}, 6–2

Details
- Draw: 32
- Seeds: 8

Events
Singles	Doubles
- ABN AMRO World Tennis Tournament

Richard Krajicek was the defending champion, but lost in the semifinals to Jan Siemerink.

Jan Siemerink won in the final 7–6^{(7–2)}, 6–2, against Thomas Johansson.

== Seeds ==
1. (Australia) Patrick Rafter (quarterfinals)
2. (Sweden) Jonas Björkman (first round)
3. (United Kingdom) Greg Rusedski (quarterfinals)
4. (Russia) Yevgeny Kafelnikov (first round)
5. (Netherlands) Richard Krajicek (semifinals)
6. (Spain) Sergi Bruguera (second round)
7. (Croatia) Goran Ivanišević (first round)
8. (withdrew)

== Draw ==
Key

- Q = Qualifier
- WC = Wild card
- LL = Lucky loser
- Alt = Alternate
- ITF = ITF entry
- PR = Protected ranking
- SR = Special ranking
- SE = Special exempt
- JE = Junior exempt
- JR = Junior Accelerator Programme entrant
- CO = College Accelerator Programme entrant
- NG = Next Gen Accelerator Program entrant
- w/o = Walkover
- r = Retired
- d = Defaulted

=== Finals ===
Semifinals
(Netherlands) Jan Siemerink	6	4	6
5	(Netherlands) Richard Krajicek	4	6	4
(Sweden) Thomas Johansson	6	7
(New Zealand) Brett Steven	3	5

Final
(Netherlands) Jan Siemerink	7	6
(Sweden) Thomas Johansson	6^{2}	2

=== Top half ===
First round
1	(Australia) P Rafter	5	7	6
WC	(Netherlands) P Wessels	7	6^{3}	1
LL	(Italy) D Scala	7	6
WC	(Netherlands) J van Lottum	5	3
(France) G Raoux	6	6
(Czech Republic) D Vacek	2	3
(Netherlands) J Siemerink	5	7	6
7	(Croatia) G Ivanišević	7	6^{6}	3
3	(United Kingdom) G Rusedski	6^{7}	7	7
(Morocco) K Alami	7	6^{3}	6^{4}
(United States) R Reneberg	2	6	7
(Sweden) T Nydahl	6	4	5
(Netherlands) P Haarhuis	3	4
Q	(Romania) A Voinea	6	6
WC	(Netherlands) D van Scheppingen	5	4
5	(Netherlands) R Krajicek	7	6

Second round
1	(Australia) P Rafter	6	6
LL	(Italy) D Scala	3	4
(France) G Raoux	7	2	2
(Netherlands) J Siemerink	6^{5}	6	6
3	(United Kingdom) G Rusedski	6	6
(United States) R Reneberg	3	2
(Romania) A Voinea	2	2
5	(Netherlands) R Krajicek	6	6

Quarterfinals
1	(Australia) P Rafter	4	4
(Netherlands) J Siemerink	6	6
3	(United Kingdom) G Rusedski	6	6^{2}	6^{3}
5	(Netherlands) R Krajicek	3	7	7

Semifinals
(Netherlands) J Siemerink	6	4	6
5	(Netherlands) R Krajicek	4	6	4

=== Bottom half ===
First round
6	(Spain) S Bruguera	7	6
(Morocco) H Arazi	6^{6}	4
(Czech Republic) J Novák	7	3	6^{7}
(Belgium) J van Herck	6^{4}	6	7
(Czech Republic) B Ulihrach	6	6^{6}	6^{4}
Q	(Denmark) K Carlsen	4	7	7
(Sweden) T Johansson	7	6
4	(Russia) Y Kafelnikov	6^{5}	2
Q	(Netherlands) R Sluiter	3	5
(New Zealand) B Steven	6	7
(France) N Escudé	3	4
(Czech Republic) M Damm	6	6
(Germany) M-K Goellner	1	3
(Sweden) M Tillström	6	6
Q	(Spain) T Carbonell	6^{5}	6	6
2	(Sweden) J Björkman	7	3	4

Second round
6	(Spain) S Bruguera	6^{6}	3
(Belgium) J van Herck	7	6
Q	(Denmark) K Carlsen	3	7	6^{8}
(Sweden) T Johansson	6	6^{5}	7
(New Zealand) B Steven	7	6^{5}	7
(Czech Republic) M Damm	6^{5}	7	5
(Sweden) M Tillström	2	6	2
Q	(Spain) T Carbonell	6	1	6

Quarterfinals
(Belgium) J van Herck	6^{8}	2
(Sweden) T Johansson	7	6
(New Zealand) B Steven	4	7	7
Q	(Spain) T Carbonell	6	6^{5}	5

Semifinals
(Sweden) T Johansson	6	7
(New Zealand) B Steven	3	5
