= Sandon Stolle =

Australian tennis player

- Full name: Sandon Frederick Stolle
- Country (sports): Australia
- Residence: Aventura, FL, United States
- Born: 13 July 1970 (age 56) Sydney, Australia
- Height: 1.93 m (6 ft 4 in)
- Turned pro: 1991
- Retired: 2003
- Plays: Right-handed (two-handed backhand)
- Prize money: $3,762,442

Singles
- Career record: 100–120
- Career titles: 0
- Highest ranking: No. 50 (13 January 1997)

Grand Slam singles results
- Australian Open: 2R (1992, 1994, 1996, 1999)
- French Open: 2R (1999)
- Wimbledon: 3R (1992, 1996, 1997)
- US Open: 2R (1992)

Doubles
- Career record: 415–251
- Career titles: 22
- Highest ranking: No. 2 (5 March 2001)

Grand Slam doubles results
- Australian Open: QF (2001)
- French Open: F (2000)
- Wimbledon: F (2000)
- US Open: W (1998)

Sandon Stolle (born 13 July 1970) is a former professional male tennis player and who was at one time ranked No. 2 in world doubles.

Sandon, the son of Australian tennis champion Fred Stolle, was born in Sydney and now lives in Aventura, Florida, United States.

Stolle won twenty-two ATP doubles titles, including one Grand Slam title (1998 U.S. Open) and reached four Grand Slam finals.

== Grand Slam finals ==
=== Doubles (1 title, 3 runner-ups) ===
Result	Year	Championship	Surface	Partner	Opponents	Score
Loss	1995	U.S. Open	Hard	(United States) Alex O'Brien	(Australia) Todd Woodbridge (Australia) Mark Woodforde	3–6, 3–6
Win	1998	U.S. Open	Hard	(Czechoslovakia) Cyril Suk	(The Bahamas) Mark Knowles (Canada) Daniel Nestor	4–6, 7–6^{(10–8)}, 6–2
Loss	2000	French Open	Clay	(Netherlands) Paul Haarhuis	(Australia) Todd Woodbridge (Australia) Mark Woodforde	6–7^{(7–9)}, 4–6
Loss	2000	Wimbledon	Grass	(Netherlands) Paul Haarhuis	(Australia) Todd Woodbridge (Australia) Mark Woodforde	3–6, 4–6, 1–6

== Career finals ==
=== Doubles: 51 (22 titles / 29 runner-ups) ===
Legend Grand Slam (1) Tennis Masters Cup (0) ATP Masters Series (4) ATP International Series Gold (4) ATP Tour (13)	Titles by surface Hard (16) Clay (0) Grass (2) Carpet (4)

Result	W-L	Date	Tournament	Surface	Partner	Opponents	Score
Win	1–0	Oct 1992	Taipei, Taiwan	Carpet	(Australia) John Fitzgerald	(Germany) Patrick Baur (South Africa) Christo van Rensburg	7–6, 6–2
Win	2–0	Jan 1993	Sydney Outdoor, Australia	Hard	(Australia) Jason Stoltenberg	(United States) Luke Jensen (United States) Murphy Jensen	6–3, 6–4
Loss	2–1	Mar 1993	Scottsdale, U.S.	Hard	(United States) Luke Jensen	(United States) Mark Keil (United States) Dave Randall	5–7, 4–6
Loss	2–2	Apr 1993	Hong Kong	Hard	(Australia) Jason Stoltenberg	(United States) David Wheaton (Australia) Todd Woodbridge	1–6, 3–6
Win	3–2	Jan 1994	Sydney Outdoor, Australia	Hard	(Australia) Darren Cahill	(Australia) Mark Kratzmann (Australia) Laurie Warder	6–1, 7–6
Loss	3–3	Feb 1994	Scottsdale, U.S.	Hard	(United States) Alex O'Brien	(Sweden) Jan Apell (United States) Ken Flach	0–6, 4–6
Win	4–3	Apr 1994	Osaka, Japan	Hard	(Czech Republic) Martin Damm	(South Africa) David Adams (Russia) Andrei Olhovskiy	6–4, 6–4
Win	5–3	Aug 1994	Cincinnati, U.S.	Hard	(United States) Alex O'Brien	(South Africa) Wayne Ferreira (Australia) Mark Kratzmann	6–7, 6–3, 6–2
Loss	5–4	Feb 1995	San Jose, U.S.	Hard (i)	(United States) Alex O'Brien	(United States) Jim Grabb (United States) Patrick McEnroe	6–3, 5–7, 0–6
Loss	5–5	May 1995	Pinehurst, U.S.	Clay	(United States) Alex O'Brien	(Australia) Todd Woodbridge (Australia) Mark Woodforde	2–6, 4–6
Loss	5–6	Jul 1995	Montreal, Canada	Hard	(United States) Brian MacPhie	(Russia) Yevgeny Kafelnikov (Russia) Andrei Olhovskiy	2–6, 2–6
Loss	5–7	Sep 1995	U.S. Open, New York	Hard	(United States) Alex O'Brien	(Australia) Todd Woodbridge (Australia) Mark Woodforde	3–6, 3–6
Loss	5–8	Jan 1996	Sydney Outdoor, Australia	Hard	(United States) Patrick McEnroe	(South Africa) Ellis Ferreira (Netherlands) Jan Siemerink	7–5, 4–6, 1–6
Loss	5–9	Apr 1996	New Delhi, India	Hard	(Zimbabwe) Byron Black	(Sweden) Jonas Björkman (Sweden) Nicklas Kulti	6–4, 4–6, 4–6
Loss	5–10	Aug 1996	Cincinnati, U.S.	Hard	(Czech Republic) Cyril Suk	(The Bahamas) Mark Knowles (Canada) Daniel Nestor	6–3, 3–6, 4–6
Win	6–10	Oct 1996	Ostrava, Czech Republic	Carpet	(Czech Republic) Cyril Suk	(Slovakia) Ján Krošlák (Slovakia) Karol Kučera	7–6, 6–3
Loss	6–11	Feb 1997	Dubai, UAE	Hard	(Czech Republic) Cyril Suk	(Netherlands) Sander Groen (Croatia) Goran Ivanišević	6–7, 3–6
Loss	6–12	Feb 1997	Antwerp, Belgium	Hard (i)	(Czech Republic) Cyril Suk	(South Africa) David Adams (France) Olivier Delaître	6–3, 2–6, 1–6
Loss	6–13	Jun 1997	London, England	Grass	(Czech Republic) Cyril Suk	(Australia) Mark Philippoussis (Australia) Patrick Rafter	2–6, 6–4, 5–7
Win	7–13	Jul 1998	Newport, U.S.	Grass	(United States) Doug Flach	(Australia) Scott Draper (Australia) Jason Stoltenberg	6–2, 4–6, 7–6
Win	8–13	Aug 1998	Los Angeles, U.S.	Hard	(Australia) Patrick Rafter	(United States) Jeff Tarango (Czech Republic) Daniel Vacek	6–4, 6–4
Win	9–13	Sep 1998	U.S. Open, New York	Hard	(Czech Republic) Cyril Suk	(The Bahamas) Mark Knowles (Canada) Daniel Nestor	4–6, 7–6, 6–2
Win	10–13	Feb 1999	Dubai, UAE	Hard	(Zimbabwe) Wayne Black	(South Africa) David Adams (South Africa) John-Laffnie de Jager	4–6, 6–1, 6–4
Loss	10–14	Mar 1999	Scottsdale, U.S.	Hard	(The Bahamas) Mark Knowles	(United States) Justin Gimelstob (United States) Richey Reneberg	4–6, 7–6, 3–6
Win	11–14	Mar 1999	Indian Wells, U.S.	Hard	(Zimbabwe) Wayne Black	(South Africa) Ellis Ferreira (United States) Rick Leach	7–6^{(7–4)}, 6–3
Win	12–14	Mar 1999	Miami, U.S.	Hard	(Zimbabwe) Wayne Black	(Germany) Boris Becker (United States) Jan-Michael Gambill	6–1, 6–1
Win	13–14	Oct 1999	Vienna, Austria	Hard (i)	(Germany) David Prinosil	(South Africa) Piet Norval (Zimbabwe) Kevin Ullyett	6–3, 6–4
Loss	13–15	Oct 1999	Lyon, France	Carpet	(South Africa) Wayne Ferreira	(South Africa) Piet Norval (Zimbabwe) Kevin Ullyett	6–4, 6–7, 6–7
Loss	13–16	Jan 2000	Adelaide, Australia	Hard	(Australia) Lleyton Hewitt	(Australia) Todd Woodbridge (Australia) Mark Woodforde	4–6, 2–6
Loss	13–17	Jan 2000	Sydney, Australia	Hard	(Australia) Lleyton Hewitt	(Australia) Todd Woodbridge (Australia) Mark Woodforde	5–7, 4–6
Loss	13–18	Mar 2000	Indian Wells, U.S.	Hard	(Netherlands) Paul Haarhuis	(United States) Alex O'Brien (United States) Jared Palmer	4–6, 6–7
Loss	13–19	Apr 2000	Monte Carlo, Monaco	Clay	(Netherlands) Paul Haarhuis	(South Africa) Wayne Ferreira (Russia) Yevgeny Kafelnikov	3–6, 6–2, 1–6
Loss	13–20	May 2000	Barcelona, Spain	Clay	(Netherlands) Paul Haarhuis	(Sweden) Nicklas Kulti (Sweden) Mikael Tillström	2–6, 7–6^{(7–2)}, 6–7^{(5–7)}
Loss	13–21	May 2000	Hamburg, Germany	Clay	(Australia) Wayne Arthurs	(Australia) Todd Woodbridge (Australia) Mark Woodforde	7–6^{(7–4)}, 4–6, 3–6
Loss	13–22	Jun 2000	French Open, Paris	Clay	(Netherlands) Paul Haarhuis	(Australia) Todd Woodbridge (Australia) Mark Woodforde	6–7, 4–6
Loss	13–23	Jun 2000	s’Hertogenbosch, Netherlands	Grass	(Netherlands) Paul Haarhuis	(Czech Republic) Martin Damm (Czech Republic) Cyril Suk	4–6, 7–6, 6–7
Loss	13–24	Jul 2000	Wimbledon, London	Grass	(Netherlands) Paul Haarhuis	(Australia) Todd Woodbridge (Australia) Mark Woodforde	3–6, 4–6, 1–6
Win	14–24	Jul 2000	Los Angeles, U.S.	Hard	(Australia) Paul Kilderry	(United States) Jan-Michael Gambill (United States) Scott Humphries	W/O
Win	15–24	Aug 2000	Indianapolis, U.S.	Hard	(Australia) Lleyton Hewitt	(Sweden) Jonas Björkman (Belarus) Max Mirnyi	6–2, 3–6, 6–3
Win	16–24	Nov 2000	Lyon, France	Carpet	(Netherlands) Paul Haarhuis	(Croatia) Ivan Ljubičić (United States) Jack Waite	6–1, 6–7, 7–6
Win	17–24	Jan 2001	Sydney, Australia	Hard	(Canada) Daniel Nestor	(Sweden) Jonas Björkman (Australia) Todd Woodbridge	2–6, 7–6^{(7–4)}, 7–6^{(7–5)}
Win	18–24	Mar 2001	Dubai, UAE	Hard	(Australia) Joshua Eagle	(Canada) Daniel Nestor (Serbia) Nenad Zimonjić	6–4, 6–4
Loss	18–25	May 2001	Rome, Italy	Clay	(Canada) Daniel Nestor	(South Africa) Wayne Ferreira (Russia) Yevgeny Kafelnikov	4–6, 6–7
Loss	18–26	May 2001	Hamburg, Germany	Clay	(Canada) Daniel Nestor	(Sweden) Jonas Björkman (Australia) Todd Woodbridge	6–7, 6–3, 3–6
Win	19–26	Jun 2001	Halle, Germany	Grass	(Canada) Daniel Nestor	(Belarus) Max Mirnyi (Australia) Patrick Rafter	6–4, 6–7^{(5–7)}, 6–1
Win	20–26	Oct 2001	Moscow, Russia	Carpet	(Belarus) Max Mirnyi	(India) Mahesh Bhupathi (United States) Jeff Tarango	6–3, 6–0
Win	21–26	Oct 2001	Stuttgart Indoor, Germany	Hard (i)	(Belarus) Max Mirnyi	(South Africa) Ellis Ferreira (United States) Jeff Tarango	7–6^{(7–0)}, 7–6^{(7–4)}
Loss	21–27	Jan 2002	Sydney, Australia	Hard	(Australia) Joshua Eagle	(United States) Donald Johnson (United States) Jared Palmer	4–6, 4–6
Loss	21–28	Mar 2002	Dubai, UAE	Hard	(Australia) Joshua Eagle	(The Bahamas) Mark Knowles (Canada) Daniel Nestor	6–3, 3–6, [11–13]
Loss	21–29	Oct 2002	Moscow, Russia	Carpet	(Australia) Joshua Eagle	(Switzerland) Roger Federer (Belarus) Max Mirnyi	4–6, 6–7
Win	22–29	Oct 2002	Vienna, Austria	Hard (i)	(Australia) Joshua Eagle	(Czech Republic) Jiří Novák (Czech Republic) Radek Štěpánek	6–4, 6–3

== Doubles performance timeline ==
Key
W	F	SF	QF	#R	RR	Q#	DNQ	A	NH

(W) winner; (F) finalist; (SF) semifinalist; (QF) quarterfinalist; (#R) rounds 4, 3, 2, 1; (RR) round-robin stage; (Q#) qualification round; (DNQ) did not qualify; (A) absent; (NH) not held; (SR) strike rate (events won / competed); (W–L) win–loss record.

Tournament	1989	1990	1991	1992	1993	1994	1995	1996	1997	1998	1999	2000	2001	2002	2003	Career SR
Grand Slam tournaments
Australian Open	A	A	2R	2R	1R	1R	1R	2R	2R	3R	3R	3R	QF	3R	1R	0 / 13
French Open	A	A	A	1R	1R	A	2R	2R	1R	1R	3R	F	3R	2R	A	0 / 10
Wimbledon	A	A	A	1R	1R	2R	3R	2R	3R	3R	QF	F	2R	3R	A	0 / 11
U.S. Open	A	A	A	1R	1R	3R	F	2R	A	W	QF	QF	SF	1R	A	1 / 10
Grand Slam SR	0 / 0	0 / 0	0 / 1	0 / 4	0 / 4	0 / 3	0 / 4	0 / 4	0 / 3	1 / 4	0 / 4	0 / 4	0 / 4	0 / 4	0 / 1	1 / 44
ATP Masters Series
Indian Wells	NME	A	A	A	A	1R	2R	1R	1R	QF	W	F	1R	QF	A	1 / 9
Miami	NME	A	1R	A	3R	2R	3R	QF	3R	QF	W	QF	2R	QF	A	1 / 11
Monte Carlo	NME	A	A	A	A	A	A	A	A	A	A	F	A	1R	A	0 / 2
Rome	NME	A	A	A	A	A	A	A	SF	2R	1R	QF	F	SF	A	0 / 6
Hamburg	NME	A	A	A	A	A	A	A	A	A	A	F	F	QF	A	0 / 3
Canada	NME	A	A	QF	A	A	F	A	2R	QF	2R	A	1R	SF	A	0 / 7
Cincinnati	NME	A	A	A	QF	W	2R	F	A	2R	QF	QF	1R	QF	A	1 / 9
Stuttgart (Stockholm)	NME	A	A	A	A	QF	1R	2R	A	2R	2R	2R	W	2R	A	1 / 8
Paris	NME	A	A	A	A	QF	1R	1R	A	QF	1R	A	QF	2R	A	0 / 7
Masters Series SR	N/A	0 / 0	0 / 1	0 / 1	0 / 2	1 / 5	0 / 6	0 / 5	0 / 4	0 / 7	2 / 7	0 / 7	1 / 8	0 / 9	0 / 0	4 / 62
Year-end ranking	781	366	188	105	69	16	23	40	39	14	9	3	5	19	1205	N/A
