= Thomas Enqvist =

Swedish tennis player

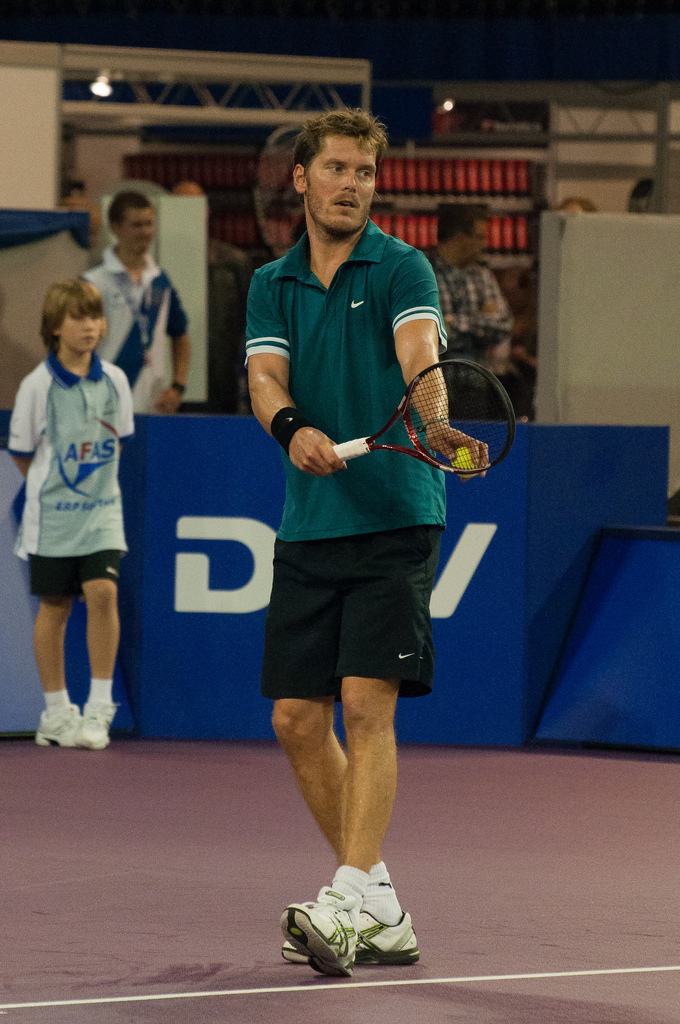
- Enqvist at the AFAS Tennis Classics Tour in Eindhoven, Netherlands in September 2010
- Country (sports): Sweden
- Residence: Monte Carlo, Monaco
- Born: 13 March 1974 (age 52) Stockholm, Sweden
- Height: 1.91 m (6 ft 3 in)
- Turned pro: 1991
- Retired: 2005
- Plays: Right-handed (two-handed backhand)
- Prize money: US$10,461,641

Singles
- Career record: 448–297 (60.1%)
- Career titles: 19
- Highest ranking: No. 4 (15 November 1999)

Grand Slam singles results
- Australian Open: F (1999)
- French Open: 4R (2001)
- Wimbledon: QF (2001)
- US Open: 4R (1993, 1996, 2000)

Other tournaments
- Tour Finals: SF (1995)
- Grand Slam Cup: SF (1999)
- Olympic Games: 3R (1996)

Doubles
- Career record: 35–46 (43.2%)
- Career titles: 1
- Highest ranking: No. 169 (8 May 2000)

Other doubles tournaments
- Olympic Games: 1R (2004)

Thomas Karl Johan Enqvist (born 13 March 1974) is a Swedish tennis coach and a former professional player. He reached the final of the 1999 Australian Open and won a total of 19 singles titles, including three Masters titles. He has a career high ATP world singles ranking of No. 4, achieved on 15 November 1999.

== Tennis career ==
Throughout his career, Enqvist finished four seasons ranked inside the top 10 and won at least one ATP title for six consecutive years. In 1998 he underwent surgery in Stockholm to remove a small piece of bone from his right foot and had surgery on his right shoulder to repair a repetitive strain injury. Despite his surgeries, Enqvist posted some major victories, including wins over world no. 1 Pete Sampras, Juan Carlos Ferrero, and Andy Roddick.

Enqvist won a total of 19 singles titles, the most significant being ATP Masters Series titles at Paris (1996), Stuttgart (1999) and both the singles and doubles titles in Cincinnati (2000). In winning the Stuttgart Masters, he defeated four top 10 players, including world no. 1 Andre Agassi.

His best showing at a Grand Slam event was at the 1999 Australian Open, when he beat Jan-Michael Gambill, Byron Black, Pat Rafter, Mark Philippoussis, Marc Rosset and Nicolás Lapentti before he was "outsmarted" in the final, losing in four sets to Yevgeny Kafelnikov of Russia. He also reached the quarterfinals at the 1996 Australian Open and at Wimbledon in 2001.

Enqvist was a force on the Swedish Davis Cup team. In 1998, he helped Sweden reach the finals of the Davis Cup for the fourth time in five years.

== Post-retirement career ==
Enqvist currently works as a commentator for Eurosport Sweden. He is also the current vice-captain for Team Europe in the Laver Cup, a position he has held since the inaugural tournament.

From 2017 to 2019, Enqvist was captain of the Sweden Davis Cup team. Starting in February 2022, he briefly coached Stefanos Tsitsipas, in a trial period during the Rotterdam Open and the Sunshine Double.

Since March 2026, he is coaching Matteo Berrettini.

== Significant finals ==
=== Grand Slam finals ===
==== Singles: 1 (0–1) ====
Result	Year	Championship	Surface	Opponent	Score
Loss	1999	Australian Open	Hard	(Russia) Yevgeny Kafelnikov	6–4, 0–6, 3–6, 6–7^{(1–7)}

=== Masters Series finals ===
==== Singles: 4 (3–1) ====
Result	Year	Tournament	Surface	Opponent	Score
Win	1996	Paris, France	Carpet (i)	(Russia) Yevgeny Kafelnikov	6–2, 6–4, 7–5
Win	1999	Stuttgart, Germany	Hard (i)	(Netherlands) Richard Krajicek	6–1, 6–4, 5–7, 7–5
Loss	2000	Indian Wells, U.S.	Hard	(Spain) Àlex Corretja	4–6, 4–6, 3–6
Win	2000	Cincinnati, U.S.	Hard	(United Kingdom) Tim Henman	7–6^{(7–5)}, 6–4

== Career singles finals ==
=== Singles: 26 (19–7) ===
Legend Grand Slam (0–1) Tennis Masters Cup (0–0) ATP Masters Series (3–1) ATP Championship Series (2–1) ATP Tour (14–4)	Titles by surface Hard (13–7) Grass (0–0) Clay (2–0) Carpet (4–0)

Result	W/L	Date	Tournament	Surface	Opponent	Score
Win	1.	Oct 1992	Bolzano, Italy	Carpet (i)	(France) Arnaud Boetsch	6–1, 1–6, 7–6^{(9–7)}
Win	2.	Aug 1993	Schenectady, U.S.	Hard	(New Zealand) Brett Steven	4–6, 6–3, 7–6^{(7–0)}
Win	3.	Jan 1995	Auckland, New Zealand	Hard	(United States) Chuck Adams	6–2, 6–1
Win	4.	Feb 1995	Philadelphia, U.S.	Carpet (i)	(United States) Michael Chang	0–6, 6–4, 6–0
Win	5.	May 1995	Pinehurst, U.S.	Clay	(Argentina) Javier Frana	6–3, 3–6, 6–3
Loss	1.	Aug 1995	Los Angeles, U.S.	Hard	(Germany) Michael Stich	7–6^{(9–7)}, 6–7^{(4–7)}, 2–6
Win	6.	Aug 1995	Indianapolis, U.S.	Hard	(Germany) Bernd Karbacher	6–4, 6–3
Win	7.	Nov 1995	Stockholm, Sweden	Hard (i)	(France) Arnaud Boetsch	7–5, 6–4
Win	8.	Apr 1996	New Delhi, India	Hard	(Zimbabwe) Byron Black	6–2, 7–6^{(7–3)}
Win	9.	Nov 1996	Paris, France	Carpet (i)	(Russia) Yevgeny Kafelnikov	6–2, 6–4, 7–5
Win	10.	Nov 1996	Stockholm, Sweden	Hard (i)	(United States) Todd Martin	7–5, 6–4, 7–6^{(7–0)}
Win	11.	Feb 1997	Marseille, France	Hard (i)	(Chile) Marcelo Ríos	6–4, 1–0, ret.
Loss	2.	Jul 1997	Los Angeles, U.S.	Hard	(United States) Jim Courier	4–6, 4–6
Win	12.	Feb 1998	Marseille, France	Hard (i)	(Russia) Yevgeny Kafelnikov	6–4, 6–1
Loss	3.	Mar 1998	Philadelphia, U.S.	Hard (i)	(United States) Pete Sampras	5–7, 6–7^{(3–7)}
Win	13.	May 1998	Munich, Germany	Clay	(United States) Andre Agassi	6–7^{(4–7)}, 7–6^{(8–6)}, 6–3
Win	14.	Jan 1999	Adelaide, Australia	Hard	(Australia) Lleyton Hewitt	4–6, 6–1, 6–2
Loss	4.	Feb 1999	Australian Open, Melbourne	Hard	(Russia) Yevgeny Kafelnikov	6–4, 0–6, 3–6, 6–7^{(1–7)}
Win	15.	Nov 1999	Stuttgart Indoor, Germany	Hard (i)	(Netherlands) Richard Krajicek	6–1, 6–4, 5–7, 7–5
Win	16.	Nov 1999	Stockholm, Sweden	Hard (i)	(Sweden) Magnus Gustafsson	6–3, 6–4, 6–2
Loss	5.	Jan 2000	Adelaide, Australia	Hard	(Australia) Lleyton Hewitt	6–3, 3–6, 2–6
Loss	6.	Mar 2000	Indian Wells, U.S.	Hard	(Spain) Àlex Corretja	4–6, 4–6, 3–6
Win	17.	Jul 2000	Cincinnati, U.S.	Hard	(United Kingdom) Tim Henman	7–6^{(7–5)}, 6–4
Loss	7.	Aug 2000	Long Island, U.S.	Hard	(Sweden) Magnus Norman	3–6, 7–5, 5–7
Win	18.	Oct 2000	Basel, Switzerland	Carpet (i)	(Switzerland) Roger Federer	6–2, 4–6, 7–6^{(7–4)}, 1–6, 6–1
Win	19.	Feb 2002	Marseille, France	Hard (i)	(France) Nicolas Escudé	6–7^{(4–7)}, 6–3, 6–1

=== Doubles: 1 (1–0) ===
Legend Grand Slam (0–0) Tennis Masters Cup (0–0) ATP Masters Series (0–0) ATP Championship Series (0–0) ATP Tour (1–0)	Titles by surface Hard (1–0) Grass (0–0) Clay (0–0) Carpet (0–0)

Result	W/L	Date	Tournament	Surface	Partner	Opponents	Score
Win	1.	Feb 1997	Marseille, France	Hard	(Sweden) Magnus Larsson	(France) Olivier Delaître (France) Fabrice Santoro	6–3, 6–4

== Singles performance timeline ==
Key
W	F	SF	QF	#R	RR	Q#	DNQ	A	NH

(W) winner; (F) finalist; (SF) semifinalist; (QF) quarterfinalist; (#R) rounds 4, 3, 2, 1; (RR) round-robin stage; (Q#) qualification round; (DNQ) did not qualify; (A) absent; (NH) not held; (SR) strike rate (events won / competed); (W–L) win–loss record.

Tournament	1989	1990	1991	1992	1993	1994	1995	1996	1997	1998	1999	2000	2001	2002	2003	2004	2005	SR	W–L
Grand Slam tournaments
Australian Open	A	A	Q2	2R	1R	2R	3R	QF	4R	2R	F	1R	A	2R	1R	3R	1R	0 / 13	21–12
French Open	A	A	A	A	1R	1R	1R	1R	A	3R	2R	3R	4R	2R	1R	3R	1R	0 / 12	11–12
Wimbledon	A	A	Q1	A	1R	A	1R	2R	A	3R	3R	4R	QF	2R	1R	3R	1R	0 / 11	15–11
U.S. Open	A	A	A	Q1	4R	3R	2R	4R	A	A	1R	4R	1R	3R	2R	2R	A	0 / 10	16–10
Win–loss	0–0	0–0	0–0	0–1	3–4	3–3	3–3	8–4	3–1	5–3	9–4	8–4	7–3	5–4	1–4	7–4	0–3	0 / 46	63–45
Year-end championships
Tennis Masters Cup	Did not qualify						SF	RR	DNQ		RR	Did not qualify						0 / 3	5–4
Grand Slam Cup	NH	Was Not Invited									SF	Not Held						0 / 1	1–1
ATP Masters Series
Indian Wells	A	A	A	A	Q1	A	3R	2R	2R	QF	1R	F	2R	QF	1R	1R	3R	0 / 11	16–11
Miami	A	A	A	A	1R	A	4R	2R	2R	QF	SF	4R	3R	3R	3R	1R	1R	0 / 12	15–11
Monte Carlo	A	A	A	A	1R	A	2R	2R	2R	1R	2R	2R	2R	1R	A	1R	A	0 / 10	4–10
Rome	A	A	A	A	A	A	A	3R	A	1R	1R	3R	2R	3R	1R	A	Q1	0 / 7	7–7
Hamburg	A	A	A	A	1R	A	A	A	A	A	A	2R	1R	1R	A	A	A	0 / 4	1–4
Canada	A	A	A	A	A	QF	SF	QF	QF	A	1R	3R	1R	1R	Q2	1R	A	0 / 9	13–9
Cincinnati	A	A	A	A	Q1	3R	SF	SF	2R	A	2R	W	1R	3R	2R	1R	A	1 / 10	20–9
Stuttgart (Madrid)	A	A	1R	3R	1R	2R	QF	3R	2R	A	W	2R	QF	A	2R	Q2	A	1 / 11	16–9
Paris	A	A	A	A	A	A	2R	W	SF	1R	3R	2R	2R	A	A	1R	Q1	1 / 8	11–7
Win–loss	N/A	0–0	0–0	0–1	0–4	6–3	15–7	14–7	6–6	6–5	13–7	19–7	8–9	8–7	4–5	0–6	2–2	3 / 82	103–77
Year-end ranking	1103	472	231	63	88	59	7	9	28	22	5	9	24	44	96	72	133	N/A	

== Top 10 wins ==
Season	1991	1992	1993	1994	1995	1996	1997	1998	1999	2000	2001	2002	2003	2004	2005	Total
Wins	0	0	0	0	10	5	1	5	10	3	1	3	1	2	0	41

#	Player	Rank	Event	Surface	Rd	Score	ER
1995
1.	(United States) Andre Agassi	2	Philadelphia, United States	Carpet (i)	SF	7–6^{(7–5)}, 5–7, 6–2	43
2.	(United States) Michael Chang	6	Philadelphia, United States	Carpet (i)	F	0–6, 6–4, 6–0	43
3.	(Croatia) Goran Ivanišević	7	Montreal, Canada	Hard	3R	6–7^{(2–7)}, 7–6^{(7–3)}, 7–5	19
4.	(United States) Michael Chang	5	Montreal, Canada	Hard	QF	6–3, 6–4	19
5.	(Croatia) Goran Ivanišević	7	Los Angeles, United States	Hard	SF	6–7^{(3–7)}, 6–4, 6–4	16
6.	(Croatia) Goran Ivanišević	7	Cincinnati, United States	Hard	QF	4–6, 6–0, 6–3	13
7.	(Croatia) Goran Ivanišević	7	Indianapolis, United States	Hard	SF	6–1, 1–6, 6–3	13
8.	(United States) Jim Courier	7	ATP Tour World Championships, Frankfurt, Germany	Carpet (i)	RR	6–3, 6–2	8
9.	(United States) Michael Chang	4	ATP Tour World Championships, Frankfurt, Germany	Carpet (i)	RR	6–1, 6–4	8
10.	(Austria) Thomas Muster	3	ATP Tour World Championships, Frankfurt, Germany	Carpet (i)	RR	6–4, 6–7^{(3–7)}, 6–4	8
1996
11.	(Netherlands) Richard Krajicek	8	Cincinnati, United States	Hard	3R	7–6^{(9–7)}, 6–2	12
12.	(United States) Pete Sampras	1	Cincinnati, United States	Hard	QF	6–3, 6–3	12
13.	(Chile) Marcelo Ríos	10	Lyon, France	Carpet (i)	QF	6–3, 2–6, 7–5	13
14.	(Russia) Yevgeny Kafelnikov	4	Paris, France	Carpet (i)	F	6–2, 6–4, 7–5	12
15.	(Germany) Boris Becker	6	ATP Tour World Championships, Hanover, Germany	Carpet (i)	RR	6–3, 7–6^{(7–1)}	9
1997
16.	(Chile) Marcelo Ríos	7	Marseille, France	Hard (i)	F	6–4, 1–0, ret.	10
1998
17.	(Spain) Carlos Moyà	8	Sydney, Australia	Hard	1R	6–7^{(6–8)}, 6–4, 6–4	27
18.	(Netherlands) Richard Krajicek	9	Marseille, France	Hard (i)	SF	6–3, 6–7^{(1–7)}, 6–3	29
19.	(Russia) Yevgeny Kafelnikov	7	Marseille, France	Hard (i)	F	6–4, 6–1	29
20.	(United Kingdom) Greg Rusedski	5	Miami, United States	Hard	4R	6–2, 6–2	24
21.	(Russia) Yevgeny Kafelnikov	6	French Open, Paris, France	Clay	2R	4–6, 7–6^{(12–10)}, 7–6^{(7–4)}, 6–1	19
1999
22.	(Australia) Patrick Rafter	4	Australian Open, Melbourne, Australia	Hard	3R	6–4, 4–6, 6–4, 6–4	21
23.	(Spain) Àlex Corretja	4	Miami, United States	Hard	4R	7–5, 6–3	15
24.	(Spain) Carlos Moyá	4	World Team Cup, Düsseldorf, Germany	Clay	RR	3–6, 6–1, 6–3	17
25.	(United Kingdom) Tim Henman	7	World Team Cup, Düsseldorf, Germany	Clay	RR	7–6^{(7–4)}, 6–4	17
26.	(Brazil) Gustavo Kuerten	5	Stuttgart, Germany	Hard (i)	3R	6–4, 5–7, 6–4	18
27.	(Chile) Marcelo Ríos	9	Stuttgart, Germany	Hard (i)	QF	6–4, 6–2	18
28.	(United States) Andre Agassi	1	Stuttgart, Germany	Hard (i)	SF	6–3, 4–6, 6–0	18
29.	(Netherlands) Richard Krajicek	8	Stuttgart, Germany	Hard (i)	F	6–1, 6–4, 5–7, 7–5	18
30.	(United States) Todd Martin	4	Paris, France	Carpet (i)	2R	4–6, 7–6^{(7–5)}, 7–6^{(8–6)}	9
31.	(Germany) Nicolas Kiefer	6	ATP Tour World Championships, Hanover, Germany	Hard (i)	RR	6–4, 7–5	4
2000
32.	(France) Cédric Pioline	10	London, United Kingdom	Hard (i)	QF	7–6^{(7–3)}, 4–6, 7–6^{(8–6)}	12
33.	(United States) Pete Sampras	2	Indian Wells, United States	Hard	QF	6–3, 3–6, 6–3	10
34.	(United Kingdom) Tim Henman	10	Basel, Switzerland	Carpet (i)	SF	6–1, 6–3	6
2001
35.	(Spain) Juan Carlos Ferrero	5	Stuttgart, Germany	Hard (i)	2R	4–6, 6–3, 7–6^{(7–4)}	27
2002
36.	(France) Sébastien Grosjean	9	Marseille, France	Hard (i)	QF	6–3, 7–5	24
37.	(Russia) Yevgeny Kafelnikov	4	Marseille, France	Hard (i)	SF	6–7^{(1–7)}, 7–6^{(12–10)}, 6–4	24
38.	(Sweden) Thomas Johansson	9	Indian Wells, United States	Hard	1R	7–6^{(7–4)}, 2–6, 6–4	22
2003
39.	(United States) Andre Agassi	2	Scottsdale, United States	Hard	1R	6–7^{(6–8)}, 6–4, 6–1	73
2004
40.	(Australia) Mark Philippoussis	9	Davis Cup, Adelaide, Australia	Hard	RR	6–3, 6–4, 6–2	78
41.	(United States) Andy Roddick	2	Memphis, United States	Hard (i)	QF	7–6^{(10–8)}, 6–3	80

Awards and achievements
Preceded by (Russia) Yevgeny Kafelnikov	ATP Most Improved Player; 1995	Succeeded by (United Kingdom) Tim Henman
Preceded by (Croatia) Goran Ivanišević	ATP Champions Tour; Year-End No.1; 2009, 2010	Succeeded by (Spain) Carlos Moyá
