= 1996 CA-TennisTrophy – Singles =

Singles
- 1996 CA-TennisTrophy

Final
- Champion: (Germany) Boris Becker
- Runner-up: (Netherlands) Jan Siemerink
- Score: 6–4, 6–7^{(7–9)}, 6–2, 6–3

Details
- Draw: 32
- Seeds: 8

Events
Singles	Doubles
← 1995 ·	Vienna Open	· 1997 →

Filip Dewulf was the defending champion but lost in the first round to Goran Ivanišević.

Boris Becker won in the final 6–4, 6–7^{(7–9)}, 6–2, 6–3 against Jan Siemerink.

== Seeds ==
1. (Austria) Thomas Muster (second round)
2. (Croatia) Goran Ivanišević (quarterfinals)
3. (Russia) Yevgeny Kafelnikov (quarterfinals)
4. (South Africa) Wayne Ferreira (first round)
5. (Germany) Boris Becker (champion)
6. (Chile) Marcelo Ríos (first round)
7. (United States) Todd Martin (semifinals)
8. (Sweden) Thomas Enqvist (second round)

== Draw ==
=== Key ===
- Q = Qualifier
- WC = Wild card
- LL = Lucky loser
- Alt = Alternate
- SE = Special exempt
- PR = Protected ranking
- ITF = ITF entry
- JE = Junior exempt
- w/o = Walkover
- r = Retired
- d = Defaulted
- SR = Special ranking

=== Final ===
Semifinals
(Netherlands) Jan Siemerink	7^{9}	6
(France) Arnaud Boetsch	6^{7}	4
5	(Germany) Boris Becker	3	6	6
7	(United States) Todd Martin	6	4	2

Final
(Netherlands) Jan Siemerink	4	7^{9}	2	3
5	(Germany) Boris Becker	6	6^{7}	6	6

=== Section 1 ===
First round
1	(Austria) T Muster	7	6
Q	(Italy) G Pozzi	5	4
Q	(Slovakia) J Krošlák	4	2
(Sweden) S Edberg	6	6
(Netherlands) J Siemerink	6	6
WC	(Austria) M Hipfl	3	0
(Spain) A Berasategui	0	4
8	(Sweden) T Enqvist	6	6
3	(Russia) Y Kafelnikov	7^{7}	6
Q	(Germany) D Prinosil	6^{2}	2
(Sweden) M Gustafsson	2	4
Q	(Italy) O Camporese	6	6
(Netherlands) P Haarhuis	6^{10}	3
(Czech Republic) D Vacek	7^{12}	6
(France) A Boetsch	6	6
6	(Chile) M Ríos	2	4

Second round
1	(Austria) T Muster	4	7^{7}	5
(Sweden) S Edberg	6	6^{2}	7
(Netherlands) J Siemerink	7^{8}	7
8	(Sweden) T Enqvist	6^{6}	5
3	(Russia) Y Kafelnikov	6	6
Q	(Italy) O Camporese	4	3
(Czech Republic) D Vacek	4	6	4
(France) A Boetsch	6	3	6

Quarterfinals
(Sweden) S Edberg	7	5	6^{4}
(Netherlands) J Siemerink	5	7	7^{7}
3	(Russia) Y Kafelnikov	6^{5}	6^{2}
(France) A Boetsch	7^{7}	7^{7}

Semifinals
(Netherlands) J Siemerink	7^{9}	6
(France) A Boetsch	6^{7}	4

=== Section 2 ===
First round
5	(Germany) B Becker	7^{7}	3	6
(Australia) M Woodforde	6^{2}	6	4
(Germany) M Stich	6	6
(Argentina) H Gumy	2	2
LL	(Italy) A Gaudenzi	3	4
(Ukraine) A Medvedev	6	6
(Switzerland) M Rosset	6	7^{7}
4	(South Africa) W Ferreira	2	6^{4}
7	(United States) T Martin	6	6
(Spain) A Costa	3	2
(Australia) J Stoltenberg	6	7^{9}
(Australia) M Philippoussis	4	6^{7}
(Czech Republic) B Ulihrach	6	6
WC	(Austria) G Schaller	2	0
WC	(Belgium) F Dewulf	6	5	2
2	(Croatia) G Ivanišević	4	7	6

Second round
5	(Germany) B Becker	3	6	6
(Germany) M Stich	6	3	4
(Ukraine) A Medvedev	6^{5}	6	4
(Switzerland) M Rosset	7^{7}	4	6
7	(United States) T Martin	6	6
(Australia) J Stoltenberg	3	4
(Czech Republic) B Ulihrach	2	2
2	(Croatia) G Ivanišević	6	6

Quarterfinals
5	(Germany) B Becker	7^{11}	7
(Switzerland) M Rosset	6^{9}	5
7	(United States) T Martin	4	6	6
2	(Croatia) G Ivanišević	6	3	3

Semifinals
5	(Germany) B Becker	3	6	6
7	(United States) T Martin	6	4	2
