= 1995 CA-TennisTrophy – Doubles =

Doubles
- 1995 CA-TennisTrophy

Final
- Champions: (South Africa) Ellis Ferreira (Netherlands) Jan Siemerink
- Runners-up: (Australia) Todd Woodbridge (Australia) Mark Woodforde
- Score: 6–4, 7–5

Details
- Draw: 16
- Seeds: 4

Events
Singles	Doubles
← 1994 ·	Vienna Open	· 1996 →

Mike Bauer and David Rikl were the defending champions but did not compete that year.

Ellis Ferreira and Jan Siemerink won in the final 6–4, 7–5 against Todd Woodbridge and Mark Woodforde.

== Seeds ==
1. (Australia) Todd Woodbridge / (Australia) Mark Woodforde (final)
2. (United States) Alex O'Brien / (Australia) Sandon Stolle (first round)
3. (United States) Mark Keil / (United States) Jeff Tarango (quarterfinals)
4. (Netherlands) Hendrik Jan Davids / (South Africa) Piet Norval (first round)

== Draw ==
=== Key ===
- Q = Qualifier
- WC = Wild card
- LL = Lucky loser
- Alt = Alternate
- SE = Special exempt
- PR = Protected ranking
- ITF = ITF entry
- JE = Junior exempt
- w/o = Walkover
- r = Retired
- d = Defaulted
- SR = Special ranking

First round
1	(Australia) T Woodbridge (Australia) M Woodforde	6	6
(Belgium) L Pimek (South Africa) B Talbot	3	4
(United Kingdom) N Broad (South Africa) G Muller	4	3
WC	(Austria) T Muster (United States) D Wheaton	6	6
4	(Netherlands) H J Davids (South Africa) P Norval	6	6	3
WC	(Austria) A Antonitsch (Germany) M-K Goellner	7	2	6
(Czech Republic) K Nováček (South Africa) M Ondruska	7	7
(United States) B Behrens (United States) M Lucena	6	5
(Netherlands) T Nijssen (United States) G Van Emburgh	7	6
(Sweden) J Björkman (Sweden) M Tillström	6	2
(Italy) D Nargiso (New Zealand) B Steven	6	7	6
3	(United States) M Keil (United States) J Tarango	7	5	7
(South Africa) E Ferreira (Netherlands) J Siemerink	7	7
Q	(South Africa) N Godwin (United States) V Spadea	6	5
WC	(Germany) P Kühnen (Germany) M Stich	6	5	6
2	(United States) A O'Brien (Australia) S Stolle	3	7	4

Quarterfinals
1	(Australia) T Woodbridge (Australia) M Woodforde	4	6	7
WC	(Austria) T Muster (United States) D Wheaton	6	3	6
WC	(Austria) A Antonitsch (Germany) M-K Goellner	6	3
(Czech Republic) K Nováček (South Africa) M Ondruska	7	6
(Netherlands) T Nijssen (United States) G Van Emburgh	6	6
3	(United States) M Keil (United States) J Tarango	2	4
(South Africa) E Ferreira (Netherlands) J Siemerink	w/o
WC	(Germany) P Kühnen (Germany) M Stich

Semifinals
1	(Australia) T Woodbridge (Australia) M Woodforde	6	6	7
(Czech Republic) K Nováček (South Africa) M Ondruska	1	7	6
(Netherlands) T Nijssen (United States) G Van Emburgh	2	4
(South Africa) E Ferreira (Netherlands) J Siemerink	6	6

Final
1	(Australia) T Woodbridge (Australia) M Woodforde	4	5
(South Africa) E Ferreira (Netherlands) J Siemerink	6	7
