= 1996 CA-TennisTrophy – Doubles =

Doubles
- 1996 CA-TennisTrophy

Final
- Champions: (Russia) Yevgeny Kafelnikov (Czech Republic) Daniel Vacek
- Runners-up: (Netherlands) Menno Oosting (Czech Republic) Pavel Vízner
- Score: 7–6, 6–4

Details
- Draw: 16
- Seeds: 4

Events
Singles	Doubles
← 1995 ·	Vienna Open	· 1997 →

Ellis Ferreira and Jan Siemerink were the defending champions but lost in the quarterfinals to David Prinosil and Michael Stich.

Yevgeny Kafelnikov and Daniel Vacek won in the final 7–6, 6–4 against Menno Oosting and Pavel Vízner.

== Seeds ==
1. (Netherlands) Jacco Eltingh / (Netherlands) Paul Haarhuis (first round)
2. (Russia) Yevgeny Kafelnikov / (Czech Republic) Daniel Vacek (champions)
3. (South Africa) Ellis Ferreira / (Netherlands) Jan Siemerink (quarterfinals)
4. (Belgium) Libor Pimek / (South Africa) Byron Talbot (quarterfinals)

== Draw ==
=== Key ===
- Q = Qualifier
- WC = Wild card
- LL = Lucky loser
- Alt = Alternate
- SE = Special exempt
- PR = Protected ranking
- ITF = ITF entry
- JE = Junior exempt
- w/o = Walkover
- r = Retired
- d = Defaulted
- SR = Special ranking

First round
1	(Netherlands) J Eltingh (Netherlands) P Haarhuis	2	4
WC	(Italy) A Gaudenzi (Switzerland) M Rosset	6	6
(United States) J Grabb (United States) T Martin	7	6	5
(Netherlands) M Oosting (Czech Republic) P Vízner	5	7	7
4	(Belgium) L Pimek (South Africa) B Talbot	5	6	7
(United Kingdom) N Broad (South Africa) P Norval	7	4	6
(South Africa) W Ferreira (United States) P Galbraith	6	7
(South Africa) J-L de Jager (Australia) D Macpherson	1	6
WC	(Germany) D Prinosil (Germany) M Stich	6	6
Q	(Austria) G Blumauer (Austria) U Plamberger	3	2
LL	(Netherlands) S Noteboom (Netherlands) F Wibier	2	4
3	(South Africa) E Ferreira (Netherlands) J Siemerink	6	6
(Sweden) D Ekerot (Czech Republic) C Suk	6	6	6
(South Africa) M Barnard (Sweden) P Nyborg	7	4	4
(Australia) S Stolle (Australia) M Tebbutt	7	6	3
2	(Russia) Y Kafelnikov (Czech Republic) D Vacek	6	7	6

Quarterfinals
WC	(Italy) A Gaudenzi (Switzerland) M Rosset	6	6	4
(Netherlands) M Oosting (Czech Republic) P Vízner	7	3	6
4	(Belgium) L Pimek (South Africa) B Talbot	2	5
(South Africa) W Ferreira (United States) P Galbraith	6	7
WC	(Germany) D Prinosil (Germany) M Stich	6	6
3	(South Africa) E Ferreira (Netherlands) J Siemerink	4	4
(Sweden) D Ekerot (Czech Republic) C Suk	7	2	4
2	(Russia) Y Kafelnikov (Czech Republic) D Vacek	6	6	6

Semifinals
(Netherlands) M Oosting (Czech Republic) P Vízner	6	6
(South Africa) W Ferreira (United States) P Galbraith	4	4
WC	(Germany) D Prinosil (Germany) M Stich	6	6	6
2	(Russia) Y Kafelnikov (Czech Republic) D Vacek	1	7	7

Final
(Netherlands) M Oosting (Czech Republic) P Vízner	6	4
2	(Russia) Y Kafelnikov (Czech Republic) D Vacek	7	6
