= 1998 CA-TennisTrophy – Doubles =

Doubles
- 1998 CA-TennisTrophy

Final
- Champions: (Russia) Yevgeny Kafelnikov (Czech Republic) Daniel Vacek
- Runners-up: (South Africa) David Adams (South Africa) John-Laffnie de Jager
- Score: 7–5, 6–3

Details
- Draw: 16
- Seeds: 4

Events
Singles	Doubles
← 1997 ·	Vienna Open	· 1999 →

Ellis Ferreira and Patrick Galbraith were the defending champions but only Ferreira competed that year with Rick Leach.

Ferreira and Leach lost in the quarterfinals to David Adams and John-Laffnie de Jager.

Yevgeny Kafelnikov and Daniel Vacek won in the final 7–5, 6–3 against Adams and de Jager.

== Seeds ==
1. (South Africa) Ellis Ferreira / (United States) Rick Leach (quarterfinals)
2. (Sweden) Jonas Björkman / (Australia) Patrick Rafter (first round)
3. (South Africa) Piet Norval / (Czech Republic) Cyril Suk (first round)
4. (United States) Donald Johnson / (United States) Francisco Montana (first round)

== Draw ==
=== Key ===
- Q = Qualifier
- WC = Wild card
- LL = Lucky loser
- Alt = Alternate
- SE = Special exempt
- PR = Protected ranking
- ITF = ITF entry
- JE = Junior exempt
- w/o = Walkover
- r = Retired
- d = Defaulted
- SR = Special ranking

First round
1	(South Africa) E Ferreira (United States) R Leach	4	6	6
(Czech Republic) J Novák (Czech Republic) D Rikl	6	4	4
(South Africa) D Adams (South Africa) J-L de Jager	6	7
(Sweden) N Kulti (Australia) D Macpherson	4	6
4	(United States) D Johnson (United States) F Montana	6	4
WC	(Austria) G Blumauer (Austria) T Buchmayer	7	6
(France) O Delaître (France) F Santoro	6	2
(United Kingdom) N Broad (South Africa) R Koenig	7	6
(South Africa) G Stafford (Zimbabwe) K Ullyett	4	4
(Russia) Y Kafelnikov (Czech Republic) D Vacek	6	6
(Australia) J Eagle (Australia) A Florent	6	6
3	(South Africa) P Norval (Czech Republic) C Suk	3	4
WC	(United States) J Grabb (United States) T Martin	6	4	7
WC	(Germany) T Haas (Germany) N Kiefer	3	6	5
Q	(South Africa) C Haggard (Sweden) P Nyborg	6	7
2	(Sweden) J Björkman (Australia) P Rafter	4	6

Quarterfinals
1	(South Africa) E Ferreira (United States) R Leach	2	4
(South Africa) D Adams (South Africa) J-L de Jager	6	6
WC	(Austria) G Blumauer (Austria) T Buchmayer	2	2
(South Africa) N Broad (South Africa) R Koenig	6	6
(Russia) Y Kafelnikov (Czech Republic) D Vacek	7	6	6
(Australia) J Eagle (Australia) A Florent	6	7	1
WC	(United States) J Grabb (United States) T Martin	6	3
Q	(South Africa) C Haggard (Sweden) P Nyborg	7	6

Semifinals
(South Africa) D Adams (South Africa) J-L de Jager	3	7	7
(United Kingdom) N Broad (South Africa) R Koenig	6	6	6
(Russia) Y Kafelnikov (Czech Republic) D Vacek	6	6
Q	(South Africa) C Haggard (Sweden) P Nyborg	3	2

Final
(South Africa) D Adams (South Africa) J-L de Jager	5	3
(Russia) Y Kafelnikov (Czech Republic) D Vacek	7	6
