= 1998 CA-TennisTrophy =

- Date: 12–19 October
- Edition: 24th
- Category: Championship Series (Double-Up Week)
- Draw: 32S / 16D
- Prize money: $675,000
- Surface: Hard / indoor
- Location: Vienna, Austria
- Venue: Wiener Stadthalle

Champions

Singles
- (United States) Pete Sampras

Doubles
- (Russia) Yevgeny Kafelnikov / (Czech Republic) Daniel Vacek
- Vienna Open

The 1998 CA-TennisTrophy was a men's tennis tournament played on indoor carpet courts at the Wiener Stadthalle in Vienna, Austria and was part of the Championship Series of the 1998 ATP Tour. It was the 24th edition of the tournament and was held from 12 October through 19 October 1998. First-seeded Pete Sampras, who entered the event on a wildcard, won the singles title.

== Finals ==
=== Singles ===
(United States) Pete Sampras defeated (Slovakia) Karol Kučera 6–3, 7–6^{(7–3)}, 6–1

- It was Sampras' 4th title of the year and the 58th of his career.

=== Doubles ===
(Russia) Yevgeny Kafelnikov / (Czech Republic) Daniel Vacek defeated (South Africa) David Adams / (South Africa) John-Laffnie de Jager 7–5, 6–3

- It was Kafelnikov's 4th title of the year and the 34th of his career. It was Vacek's only title of the year and the 20th of his career.
