= 1998 CA-TennisTrophy – Singles =

Singles
- 1998 CA-TennisTrophy

Final
- Champion: (United States) Pete Sampras
- Runner-up: (Slovakia) Karol Kučera
- Score: 6–3, 7–6^{(7–3)}, 6–1

Details
- Draw: 32
- Seeds: 8

Events
Singles	Doubles
← 1997 ·	Vienna Open	· 1999 →

Goran Ivanišević was the defending champion but did not compete that year.

Pete Sampras won in the final 6–3, 7–6^{(7–3)}, 6–1 against Karol Kučera.

== Seeds ==
1. (United States) Pete Sampras (champion)
2. (Australia) Patrick Rafter (quarterfinals)
3. (Spain) Carlos Moyà (first round)
4. (Czech Republic) Petr Korda (second round)
5. (Slovakia) Karol Kučera (final)
6. (Netherlands) Richard Krajicek (second round)
7. (Russia) Yevgeny Kafelnikov (first round)
8. (United Kingdom) Tim Henman (quarterfinals)

== Draw ==
=== Key ===
- Q = Qualifier
- WC = Wild card
- LL = Lucky loser
- Alt = Alternate
- SE = Special exempt
- PR = Protected ranking
- ITF = ITF entry
- JE = Junior exempt
- w/o = Walkover
- r = Retired
- d = Defaulted
- SR = Special ranking

=== Final ===
Semifinals
WC/1	(United States) Pete Sampras	6	7^{7}
(United States) Todd Martin	3	6^{4}
5	(Slovakia) Karol Kučera	7^{8}	6
(United Kingdom) Greg Rusedski	6^{6}	4

Final
WC/1	(United States) Pete Sampras	6	7^{7}	6
5	(Slovakia) Karol Kučera	3	6^{3}	1

=== Section 1 ===
First round
WC/1	(United States) P Sampras	6	7
Q	(Slovakia) J Krošlák	2	5
(Australia) J Stoltenberg	2	2
Q	(United States) J Tarango	6	6
(Sweden) T Enqvist	4	6	6
WC	(Austria) W Schranz	6	3	2
(Sweden) M Gustafsson	3	4
8	(United Kingdom) T Henman	6	6
4	(Czech Republic) P Korda	7^{7}	6
(France) F Santoro	6^{4}	2
(Germany) N Kiefer	6	3	4
(United States) T Martin	4	6	6
(France) C Pioline	6	7^{9}
(Australia) R Fromberg	3	6^{7}
(Spain) Á Costa	3	7^{7}	4
6	(Netherlands) R Krajicek	6	6^{4}	6

Second round
WC/1	(United States) P Sampras	5	6	6
Q	(United States) J Tarango	7	1	3
(Sweden) T Enqvist	7^{7}	3	3
8	(United Kingdom) T Henman	6^{2}	6	6
4	(Czech Republic) P Korda	3	6^{2}
(United States) T Martin	6	7^{7}
(France) C Pioline	7^{7}	6^{5}	6
6	(Netherlands) R Krajicek	6^{1}	7^{7}	4

Quarterfinals
WC/1	(United States) P Sampras	6	6
8	(United Kingdom) T Henman	0	3
(United States) T Martin	6	6
(France) C Pioline	4	3

Semifinals
WC/1	(United States) P Sampras	6	7^{7}
(United States) T Martin	3	6^{4}

=== Section 2 ===
First round
5	(Slovakia) K Kučera	6	3	7
(South Africa) W Ferreira	4	6	5
(Germany) T Haas	6	1	6
Q	(France) A Clément	4	6	3
(Sweden) J Björkman	6	7^{7}
Q	(Germany) D Prinosil	4	6^{1}
(Czech Republic) B Ulihrach	7^{8}	6
3	(Spain) C Moyà	6^{6}	4
WC/7	(Russia) Y Kafelnikov	3	6	6^{3}
(United Kingdom) G Rusedski	6	3	7^{7}
(Austria) T Muster	6	6
(Netherlands) J Siemerink	2	4
(Czech Republic) D Vacek	5	4
(Sweden) M Norman	7	6
(Zimbabwe) B Black	3	6^{3}
2	(Australia) P Rafter	6	7^{7}

Second round
5	(Slovakia) K Kučera	7	6
(Germany) T Haas	5	4
(Sweden) J Björkman	6	6
(Czech Republic) B Ulihrach	4	1
(United Kingdom) G Rusedski	6	6
(Austria) T Muster	4	3
(Sweden) M Norman	3	2
2	(Australia) P Rafter	6	6

Quarterfinals
5	(Slovakia) K Kučera	6	6
(Sweden) J Björkman	3	2
(United Kingdom) G Rusedski	6	7^{7}
2	(Australia) P Rafter	3	6^{3}

Semifinals
5	(Slovakia) K Kučera	7^{8}	6
(United Kingdom) G Rusedski	6^{6}	4
