= 1995 CA-TennisTrophy =

- Date: 16–23 October
- Edition: 21st
- Category: World Series
- Draw: 32S / 16D
- Prize money: $465,000
- Surface: Carpet / indoor
- Location: Vienna, Austria
- Venue: Wiener Stadthalle

Champions

Singles
- (Belgium) Filip Dewulf

Doubles
- (South Africa) Ellis Ferreira / (Netherlands) Jan Siemerink
- Vienna Open

The 1995 CA-TennisTrophy was a men's tennis tournament played on indoor carpet courts at the Wiener Stadthalle in Vienna, Austria and was part of the World Series of the 1995 ATP Tour. It was the 21st edition of the tournament and was held from 16 to 23 October 1995. Unseeded Filip Dewulf, who entered the main draw as a qualifier, won the singles title.

== Finals ==
=== Singles ===
(Belgium) Filip Dewulf defeated (Austria) Thomas Muster 7–5, 6–2, 1–6, 7–5

- It was Dewulf's only title of the year and the 2nd of his career.

=== Doubles ===
(South Africa) Ellis Ferreira / (Netherlands) Jan Siemerink defeated (Australia) Todd Woodbridge / (Australia) Mark Woodforde 6–4, 7–5

- It was Ferreira's only title of the year and the 1st of his career. It was Siemerink's 2nd title of the year and the 7th of his career.
