= 1997 CA-TennisTrophy =

- Date: 6–13 October
- Edition: 23rd
- Category: Championship Series (Double-Up Week)
- Draw: 32S / 16D
- Prize money: $675,000
- Surface: Carpet / indoor
- Location: Vienna, Austria
- Venue: Wiener Stadthalle

Champions

Singles
- (Croatia) Goran Ivanišević

Doubles
- (South Africa) Ellis Ferreira / (United States) Patrick Galbraith
- Vienna Open

The 1997 CA-TennisTrophy was a men's tennis tournament played on indoor carpet courts at the Wiener Stadthalle in Vienna, Austria and was part of the Championship Series of the 1997 ATP Tour. It was the 23rd edition of the tournament and was held from 6 October through 13 October 1997. Third-seeded Goran Ivanišević won the singles title.

== Finals ==
=== Singles ===
(Croatia) Goran Ivanišević defeated (United Kingdom) Greg Rusedski 3–6, 6–7^{(4–7)}, 7–6^{(7–4)}, 6–2, 6–3

- It was Ivanišević's 5th title of the year and the 29th of his career.

=== Doubles ===
(South Africa) Ellis Ferreira / (United States) Patrick Galbraith defeated (Germany) Marc-Kevin Goellner / (Germany) David Prinosil 6–3, 6–4

- It was Ferreira's 4th title of the year and the 7th of his career. It was Galbraith's 4th title of the year and the 32nd of his career.
