= 1997 CA-TennisTrophy – Singles =

Singles
- 1997 CA-TennisTrophy

Final
- Champion: (Croatia) Goran Ivanišević
- Runner-up: (United Kingdom) Greg Rusedski
- Score: 4–6, 6–7^{(4–7)}, 7–6^{(7–4)}, 6–2, 6–3

Details
- Draw: 32
- Seeds: 8

Events
Singles	Doubles
← 1996 ·	Vienna Open	· 1998 →

Boris Becker was the defending champion but did not compete that year.

Goran Ivanišević won in the final 4–6, 6–7^{(4–7)}, 7–6^{(7–4)}, 6–2, 6–3 against Greg Rusedski.

== Seeds ==
1. (Russia) Yevgeny Kafelnikov (first round)
2. (Spain) Sergi Bruguera (first round)
3. (Croatia) Goran Ivanišević (champion)
4. (United Kingdom) Greg Rusedski (final)
5. (Brazil) Gustavo Kuerten (second round)
6. (Austria) Thomas Muster (second round)
7. (Spain) Félix Mantilla (first round)
8. (Sweden) Thomas Enqvist (second round)

== Draw ==
=== Key ===
- Q = Qualifier
- WC = Wild card
- LL = Lucky loser
- Alt = Alternate
- SE = Special exempt
- PR = Protected ranking
- ITF = ITF entry
- JE = Junior exempt
- w/o = Walkover
- r = Retired
- d = Defaulted
- SR = Special ranking

=== Final ===
Semifinals
(United Kingdom) Tim Henman	4	4
4	(United Kingdom) Greg Rusedski	6	6
3	(Croatia) Goran Ivanišević	5	6	7^{8}
(Netherlands) Richard Krajicek	7	4	6^{6}

Final
4	(United Kingdom) Greg Rusedski	6	7^{7}	6^{4}	2	3
3	(Croatia) Goran Ivanišević	4	6^{4}	7^{7}	6	6

=== Section 1 ===
First round
1	(Russia) Y Kafelnikov	4	5
(Slovakia) K Kučera	6	7
WC	(Germany) T Haas	6	6
(France) A Boetsch	3	2
(Netherlands) J Siemerink	2	4
Q	(Sweden) J Apell	6	6
(United Kingdom) T Henman	6	4	6
7	(Spain) F Mantilla	4	6	4
4	(United Kingdom) G Rusedski	7^{11}	6
(Ukraine) A Medvedev	6^{9}	4
Q	(Germany) D Prinosil	2	6^{0}
(Sweden) M Norman	6	7^{7}
(Spain) J Sánchez	2	2
WC	(United States) T Martin	6	6
(Morocco) H Arazi	2	2
6	(Austria) T Muster	6	6

Second round
(Slovakia) K Kučera	6	6
WC	(Germany) T Haas	1	3
Q	(Sweden) J Apell	3	3
(United Kingdom) T Henman	6	6
4	(United Kingdom) G Rusedski	6	6
(Sweden) M Norman	4	2
WC	(United States) T Martin	6	3	6
6	(Austria) T Muster	4	6	4

Quarterfinals
(Slovakia) K Kučera	4	1
(United Kingdom) T Henman	6	6
4	(United Kingdom) G Rusedski	6	6^{5}	6
WC	(United States) T Martin	1	7^{7}	3

Semifinals
(United Kingdom) T Henman	4	4
4	(United Kingdom) G Rusedski	6	6

=== Section 2 ===
First round
5	(Brazil) G Kuerten	7	3	7^{7}
(Spain) Á Costa	5	6	6^{2}
(Czech Republic) B Ulihrach	6	6
Q	(Netherlands) S Schalken	2	2
(United States) C Woodruff	6	6
(Australia) M Philippoussis	4	4
LL	(Denmark) F Fetterlein	3	6	3
3	(Croatia) G Ivanišević	6	4	6
8	(Sweden) T Enqvist	6	4
(Switzerland) M Rosset	4	0	r
(Germany) M-K Goellner	6	6^{3}	6^{4}
(Sweden) M Larsson	2	7^{7}	7^{7}
(Netherlands) R Krajicek	6	6
(Belgium) F Dewulf	4	2
Q	(France) A Clément	6	7^{8}
2	(Spain) S Bruguera	2	6^{6}

Second round
5	(Brazil) G Kuerten	4	4
(Czech Republic) B Ulihrach	6	6
(United States) C Woodruff	4	6^{4}
3	(Croatia) G Ivanišević	6	7^{7}
8	(Sweden) T Enqvist	5	4
(Sweden) M Larsson	7	6
(Netherlands) R Krajicek	3	6	6
Q	(France) A Clément	6	4	2

Quarterfinals
(Czech Republic) B Ulihrach	6^{2}	6	3
3	(Croatia) G Ivanišević	7^{7}	3	6
(Sweden) M Larsson	4	4
(Netherlands) R Krajicek	6	6

Semifinals
3	(Croatia) G Ivanišević	5	6	7^{8}
(Netherlands) R Krajicek	7	4	6^{6}
