= 1999 CA-TennisTrophy – Doubles =

Doubles
- 1999 CA-TennisTrophy

Final
- Champions: (Germany) David Prinosil (Australia) Sandon Stolle
- Runners-up: (South Africa) Piet Norval (Zimbabwe) Kevin Ullyett
- Score: 6–3, 6–4

Details
- Draw: 16
- Seeds: 4

Events
Singles	Doubles
← 1998 ·	Vienna Open	· 2000 →

Yevgeny Kafelnikov and Daniel Vacek were the defending champions but lost in the first round to Nicolás Lapentti and Marat Safin.

David Prinosil and Sandon Stolle won in the final 6–3, 6–4 against Piet Norval and Kevin Ullyett.

== Seeds ==
1. (South Africa) David Adams / (South Africa) John-Laffnie de Jager (first round)
2. (Russia) Yevgeny Kafelnikov / (Czech Republic) Daniel Vacek (first round)
3. (Spain) Tomás Carbonell / (United States) Jared Palmer (first round)
4. (Germany) David Prinosil / (Australia) Sandon Stolle (champions)

== Draw ==
=== Key ===
- Q = Qualifier
- WC = Wild card
- LL = Lucky loser
- Alt = Alternate
- ITF = ITF entry
- PR = Protected ranking
- SR = Special ranking
- SE = Special exempt
- JE = Junior exempt
- JR = Junior Accelerator Programme entrant
- CO = College Accelerator Programme entrant
- NG = Next Gen Accelerator Program entrant
- w/o = Walkover
- r = Retired
- d = Defaulted

First round
1	(South Africa) D Adams (South Africa) J-L de Jager	6^{3}	6	1
(South Africa) P Norval (Zimbabwe) K Ullyett	7^{7}	2	6
WC	(Germany) N Kiefer (Austria) S Koubek	2	2
(Czech Republic) J Novák (Czech Republic) D Rikl	6	6
3	(Spain) T Carbonell (United States) J Palmer	3	5
(Australia) A Florent (Australia) D Macpherson	6	7
(South Africa) B Haygarth (North Macedonia) A Kitinov	1	6^{4}
(South Africa) C Haggard (Sweden) P Nyborg	6	7^{7}
WC	(Austria) G Blumauer (Austria) T Buchmayer	4	6	3
(United States) D Johnson (Czech Republic) C Suk	6	1	6
(Croatia) G Ivanišević (United States) J Tarango	6^{3}	7^{7}	3
4	(Germany) D Prinosil (Australia) S Stolle	7^{7}	6^{2}	6
WC	(United States) T Martin (United States) R Reneberg	6	6^{6}	6^{4}
(South Africa) R Koenig (Russia) A Olhovskiy	4	7^{8}	7^{7}
Q	(Ecuador) N Lapentti (Russia) M Safin	7	6
2	(Russia) Y Kafelnikov (Czech Republic) D Vacek	5	4

Quarterfinals
(South Africa) P Norval (Zimbabwe) K Ullyett	6	6^{5}	6
(Czech Republic) J Novák (Czech Republic) D Rikl	4	7^{7}	4
(Australia) A Florent (Australia) D Macpherson	7	6
(South Africa) C Haggard (Sweden) P Nyborg	5	3
(United States) D Johnson (Czech Republic) C Suk	6	2	3
4	(Germany) D Prinosil (Australia) S Stolle	4	6	6
(South Africa) R Koenig (Russia) A Olhovskiy	6	6^{5}	6
Q	(Ecuador) N Lapentti (Russia) M Safin	2	7^{7}	3

Semifinals
(South Africa) P Norval (Zimbabwe) K Ullyett	7^{7}	6
(Australia) A Florent (Australia) D Macpherson	6^{3}	3
4	(Germany) D Prinosil (Australia) S Stolle	4	6	7^{7}
(South Africa) R Koenig (Russia) A Olhovskiy	6	2	6^{5}

Final
(South Africa) P Norval (Zimbabwe) K Ullyett	3	4
4	(Germany) D Prinosil (Australia) S Stolle	6	6
