= 1999 CA-TennisTrophy =

- Date: 11–18 October
- Edition: 25th
- Category: Championship Series (Double-Up Week)
- Draw: 32S / 16D
- Prize money: $675,000
- Surface: Carpet / indoor
- Location: Vienna, Austria
- Venue: Wiener Stadthalle

Champions

Singles
- (United Kingdom) Greg Rusedski

Doubles
- (Germany) David Prinosil / (Australia) Sandon Stolle
- Vienna Open

The 1999 CA-TennisTrophy was a men's tennis tournament played on indoor carpet courts at the Wiener Stadthalle in Vienna, Austria and was part of the Championship Series of the 1999 ATP Tour. It was the 25th edition of the tournament and was held from 11 October until 18 October 1999. Fifth-seeded Greg Rusedski won the singles title.

== Finals ==
=== Singles ===
(United Kingdom) Greg Rusedski defeated (Germany) Nicolas Kiefer 6–7^{(5–7)}, 2–6, 6–3, 7–5, 6–4

- It was Rusedski's 3rd title of the year and the 12th of his career.

=== Doubles ===
(Germany) David Prinosil / (Australia) Sandon Stolle defeated (South Africa) Piet Norval / (Zimbabwe) Kevin Ullyett 6–3, 6–4

- It was Prinosil's only title of the year and the 8th of his career. It was Stolle's 4th title of the year and the 13th of his career.
