= 1996 CA-TennisTrophy =

- Date: 7–13 October
- Edition: 22nd
- Category: Championship Series (Single Week)
- Draw: 32S / 16D
- Prize money: $675,000
- Surface: Carpet / indoor
- Location: Vienna, Austria
- Venue: Wiener Stadthalle

Champions

Singles
- (Germany) Boris Becker

Doubles
- (Russia) Yevgeny Kafelnikov / (Czech Republic) Daniel Vacek
- Vienna Open

The 1996 CA-TennisTrophy was a men's tennis tournament played on indoor carpet courts at the Wiener Stadthalle in Vienna in Austria and was part of the Championship Series of the 1996 ATP Tour. It was the 22nd edition of the tournament and took place from 7 October through 13 October 1996. Fifth-seeded Boris Becker won the singles title.

== Finals ==
=== Singles ===
(Germany) Boris Becker defeated (Netherlands) Jan Siemerink 6–4, 6–7^{(7–9)}, 6–2, 6–3

- It was Becker's 3rd title of the year and the 62nd of his career.

=== Doubles ===
(Russia) Yevgeny Kafelnikov / (Czech Republic) Daniel Vacek defeated (Netherlands) Menno Oosting / (Czech Republic) Pavel Vízner 7–6, 6–4

- It was Kafelnikov's 9th title of the year and the 24th of his career. It was Vacek's 4th title of the year and the 14th of his career.
