= 1999 CA-TennisTrophy – Singles =

Singles
- 1999 CA-TennisTrophy

Final
- Champion: (United Kingdom) Greg Rusedski
- Runner-up: (Germany) Nicolas Kiefer
- Score: 6–7^{(5–7)}, 2–6, 6–3, 7–5, 6–4

Details
- Draw: 32
- Seeds: 8

Events
Singles	Doubles
← 1998 ·	Vienna Open	· 2000 →

Pete Sampras was the defending champion but did not compete that year.

Greg Rusedski won in the final 6–7^{(5–7)}, 2–6, 6–3, 7–5, 6–4 against Nicolas Kiefer.

== Seeds ==
1. (Russia) Yevgeny Kafelnikov (quarterfinals)
2. (United States) Todd Martin (first round)
3. (Brazil) Gustavo Kuerten (first round)
4. (United Kingdom) Tim Henman (first round)
5. (United Kingdom) Greg Rusedski (champion)
6. (Netherlands) Richard Krajicek (semifinals)
7. (Germany) Nicolas Kiefer (final)
8. (Ecuador) Nicolás Lapentti (second round)

== Draw ==
=== Key ===
- Q = Qualifier
- WC = Wild card
- LL = Lucky loser
- Alt = Alternate
- SE = Special exempt
- PR = Protected ranking
- ITF = ITF entry
- JE = Junior exempt
- w/o = Walkover
- r = Retired
- d = Defaulted
- SR = Special ranking

=== Final ===
Semifinals
7	(Germany) Nicolas Kiefer	7^{11}	6
6	(Netherlands) Richard Krajicek	6^{9}	4
5	(United Kingdom) Greg Rusedski	6	6
WC	(Switzerland) Roger Federer	3	4

Final
7	(Germany) Nicolas Kiefer	7^{7}	6	3	5	4
5	(United Kingdom) Greg Rusedski	6^{5}	2	6	7	6

=== Section 1 ===
First round
1	(Russia) Y Kafelnikov	6	6
(Sweden) T Enqvist	3	4
Q	(France) A Clément	7	6^{5}	6^{6}
(Netherlands) J Siemerink	5	7^{7}	7^{8}
Q	(Germany) L Burgsmüller	6^{5}	6	3
WC	(Austria) J Melzer	7^{7}	2	6
(Argentina) M Zabaleta	3	4
7	(Germany) N Kiefer	6	6
3	(Brazil) G Kuerten	1	7^{7}	4
(Croatia) G Ivanišević	6	6^{2}	6
(Austria) S Koubek	6	6
Q	(United States) J Tarango	4	4
(Sweden) M Larsson	6	7^{7}
(France) C Pioline	4	6^{2}
Q	(Switzerland) G Bastl	6	5	4
6	(Netherlands) R Krajicek	4	7	6

Second round
1	(Russia) Y Kafelnikov	w/o
(Netherlands) J Siemerink
WC	(Austria) J Melzer	4	0
7	(Germany) N Kiefer	6	6
(Croatia) G Ivanišević	7^{7}	2	4
(Austria) S Koubek	6^{3}	6	6
(Sweden) M Larsson	4	2
6	(Netherlands) R Krajicek	6	6

Quarterfinals
1	(Russia) Y Kafelnikov	0	4
7	(Germany) N Kiefer	6	6
(Austria) S Koubek	2	1
6	(Netherlands) R Krajicek	6	6

Semifinals
7	(Germany) N Kiefer	7^{11}	6
6	(Netherlands) R Krajicek	6^{9}	4

=== Section 2 ===
First round
5	(United Kingdom) G Rusedski	4	6	7^{7}
(Sweden) T Johansson	6	3	6^{3}
(Ukraine) A Medvedev	6	6
WC	(Austria) O Marach	4	2
(France) S Grosjean	6	4	7^{7}
(Switzerland) M Rosset	3	6	6^{5}
(Russia) M Safin	6	2	6
4	(United Kingdom) T Henman	4	6	3
8	(Ecuador) N Lapentti	7^{7}	6
(Spain) F Clavet	6^{1}	2
(Slovakia) K Kučera	3	6	7^{7}
(Slovakia) D Hrbatý	6	4	6^{3}
WC	(Switzerland) R Federer	6	6
(United States) V Spadea	4	2
(Czech Republic) J Novák	7^{7}	6^{5}	6
2	(United States) T Martin	6^{3}	7^{7}	4

Second round
5	(United Kingdom) G Rusedski	4	7	6
(Ukraine) A Medvedev	6	5	3
(France) S Grosjean	6	4	7^{7}
(Russia) M Safin	4	6	6^{5}
8	(Ecuador) N Lapentti	2	3
(Slovakia) K Kučera	6	6
WC	(Switzerland) R Federer	7^{10}	6
(Czech Republic) J Novák	6^{8}	1

Quarterfinals
5	(United Kingdom) G Rusedski	7	6
(France) S Grosjean	5	2
(Slovakia) K Kučera	6	4	1
WC	(Switzerland) R Federer	2	6	6

Semifinals
5	(United Kingdom) G Rusedski	6	6
WC	(Switzerland) R Federer	3	4
