= 1997 CA-TennisTrophy – Doubles =

Doubles
- 1997 CA-TennisTrophy

Final
- Champions: (South Africa) Ellis Ferreira (United States) Patrick Galbraith
- Runners-up: (Germany) Marc-Kevin Goellner (Germany) David Prinosil
- Score: 6–3, 6–4

Details
- Draw: 16
- Seeds: 4

Events
Singles	Doubles
← 1996 ·	Vienna Open	· 1998 →

Yevgeny Kafelnikov and Daniel Vacek were the defending champions but did not compete that year.

Ellis Ferreira and Patrick Galbraith won in the final 6–3, 6–4 against Marc-Kevin Goellner and David Prinosil.

== Seeds ==
1. (South Africa) Ellis Ferreira / (United States) Patrick Galbraith (champions)
2. (Argentina) Luis Lobo / (Spain) Javier Sánchez (first round)
3. # (South Africa) David Adams / (Russia) Andrei Olhovskiy (first round)
4. (United States) Donald Johnson / (United States) Francisco Montana (first round)

== Draw ==
=== Key ===
- Q = Qualifier
- WC = Wild card
- LL = Lucky loser
- Alt = Alternate
- SE = Special exempt
- PR = Protected ranking
- ITF = ITF entry
- JE = Junior exempt
- w/o = Walkover
- r = Retired
- d = Defaulted
- SR = Special ranking

First round
1	(South Africa) E Ferreira (United States) P Galbraith	7	6
WC	(Austria) T Buchmayer (Austria) T Strengberger	6	0
(Germany) K Braasch (Sweden) P Nyborg	7	6
(Zimbabwe) W Black (United States) J Grabb	6	3
4	(United States) D Johnson (United States) F Montana	6	5
(United Kingdom) N Broad (South Africa) P Norval	7	7
WC	(Croatia) G Ivanišević (Netherlands) J Siemerink	6	7
(Netherlands) T Kempers (Netherlands) M Oosting	2	6
(North Macedonia) A Kitinov (South Africa) B Talbot	6	3	4
(France) A Boetsch (Belgium) F Dewulf	3	6	6
(Argentina) P Albano (Brazil) G Kuerten	6	7
3	(South Africa) D Adams (Russia) A Olhovskiy	4	5
(Germany) M-K Goellner (Germany) D Prinosil	6	6
WC	(Austria) G Blumauer (Austria) G Mandl	2	3
(Czech Republic) P Vízner (Netherlands) F Wibier	6	7	7
2	(Argentina) L Lobo (Spain) J Sánchez	7	6	6

Quarterfinals
1	(South Africa) E Ferreira (United States) P Galbraith	6	6	6
(Germany) K Braasch (Sweden) P Nyborg	3	7	3
(United Kingdom) N Broad (South Africa) P Norval	5	6	6
WC	(Croatia) G Ivanišević (Netherlands) J Siemerink	7	3	4
(France) A Boetsch (Belgium) F Dewulf	3	2
(Argentina) P Albano (Brazil) G Kuerten	6	6
(Germany) M-K Goellner (Germany) D Prinosil	6	7
(Czech Republic) P Vízner (Netherlands) F Wibier	3	6

Semifinals
1	(South Africa) E Ferreira (United States) P Galbraith	6	6
(United Kingdom) N Broad (South Africa) P Norval	1	4
(Argentina) P Albano (Brazil) G Kuerten	1	3
(Germany) M-K Goellner (Germany) D Prinosil	6	6

Final
1	(South Africa) E Ferreira (United States) P Galbraith	6	6
(Germany) M-K Goellner (Germany) D Prinosil	3	4
