= 1995 CA-TennisTrophy – Singles =

Singles
- 1995 CA-TennisTrophy

Final
- Champion: (Belgium) Filip Dewulf
- Runner-up: (Austria) Thomas Muster
- Score: 7–5, 6–2, 1–6, 7–5

Details
- Draw: 32
- Seeds: 8

Events
Singles	Doubles
- Vienna Open

Andre Agassi was the defending champion but did not compete that year.

Filip Dewulf won in the final 7–5, 6–2, 1–6, 7–5 against Thomas Muster.

== Seeds ==
1. (Austria) Thomas Muster (final)
2. (Sweden) Thomas Enqvist (first round)
3. (Germany) Michael Stich (quarterfinals, retired)
4. (Ukraine) Andriy Medvedev (first round)
5. (Netherlands) Jan Siemerink (second round)
6. (Austria) Gilbert Schaller (second round)
7. (Russia) Alexander Volkov (quarterfinals)
8. (Sweden) Jonas Björkman (semifinals)

== Draw ==
Key

- Q = Qualifier
- WC = Wild card
- LL = Lucky loser
- Alt = Alternate
- ITF = ITF entry
- PR = Protected ranking
- SR = Special ranking
- SE = Special exempt
- JE = Junior exempt
- JR = Junior Accelerator Programme entrant
- CO = College Accelerator Programme entrant
- NG = Next Gen Accelerator Program entrant
- w/o = Walkover
- r = Retired
- d = Defaulted

=== Final ===
Semifinals
1	(Austria) Thomas Muster	6	7
(Australia) Todd Woodbridge	4	5
Q	(Belgium) Filip Dewulf	7^{7}	6
8	(Sweden) Jonas Björkman	6^{5}	3

Final
1	(Austria) Thomas Muster	5	2	6	5
Q	(Belgium) Filip Dewulf	7	6	1	7

=== Section 1 ===
First round
1	(Austria) T Muster	6	1	6
(United States) M Washington	4	6	3
(Australia) M Woodforde	6	6
WC	(Austria) M Hipfl	3	1
(Germany) M-K Goellner	3	4
(Romania) A Voinea	6	6
(Germany) O Gross	3	1
7	(Russia) A Volkov	6	6
3	(Germany) M Stich	6	6
WC	(Austria) W Schranz	4	4
Q	(Sweden) T Johansson	6	6
(Sweden) M Gustafsson	2	4
(United States) V Spadea	6^{3}	6^{1}
(Australia) T Woodbridge	7^{7}	7^{7}
(Australia) R Fromberg	3	2
5	(Netherlands) J Siemerink	6	6

Second round
1	(Austria) T Muster	6	6
(Australia) M Woodforde	3	4
(Romania) A Voinea	7^{7}	4	6^{5}
7	(Russia) A Volkov	6^{2}	6	7^{7}
3	(Germany) M Stich	7^{7}	6
Q	(Sweden) T Johansson	6^{5}	4
(Australia) T Woodbridge	6	7
5	(Netherlands) J Siemerink	4	5

Quarterfinals
1	(Austria) T Muster	7^{7}	6
7	(Russia) A Volkov	6^{4}	1
3	(Germany) M Stich	2^{r}
(Australia) T Woodbridge	2

Semifinals
1	(Austria) T Muster	6	7
(Australia) T Woodbridge	4	5

=== Section 2 ===
First round
6	(Austria) G Schaller	3	6	7^{7}
(Germany) M Sinner	6	4	6^{2}
Q	(Belgium) F Dewulf	6	6
(United States) D Wheaton	2	3
(Germany) P Kühnen	7^{7}	6
(Czech Republic) K Nováček	6^{3}	4
Q	(Uzbekistan) O Ogorodov	6	6
4	(Ukraine) A Medvedev	3	1
8	(Sweden) J Björkman	3	6	6
Q	(Sweden) C Bergström	6	3	3
(South Africa) M Ondruska	6^{4}	6	7
WC	(Austria) C Trimmel	7^{7}	2	5
(United States) J Tarango	6	7
(Slovakia) J Krošlák	4	5
(New Zealand) B Steven	7^{8}	3	6
2	(Sweden) T Enqvist	6^{6}	6	2

Second round
6	(Austria) G Schaller	3	4
Q	(Belgium) F Dewulf	6	6
(Germany) P Kühnen	4	3
Q	(Uzbekistan) O Ogorodov	6	6
8	(Sweden) J Björkman	6	6
(South Africa) M Ondruska	4	4
(United States) J Tarango	6	7
(New Zealand) B Steven	1	5

Quarterfinals
Q	(Belgium) F Dewulf	6	6
Q	(Uzbekistan) O Ogorodov	3	1
8	(Sweden) J Björkman	6	6
(United States) J Tarango	2	3

Semifinals
Q	(Belgium) F Dewulf	7^{7}	6
8	(Sweden) J Björkman	6^{5}	3
