= 1988 Cedok Open – Singles =

Singles
- 1988 Cedok Open

Final
- Champion: (Austria) Thomas Muster
- Runner-up: (Argentina) Guillermo Pérez Roldán
- Score: 6–4, 5–7, 6–2

Details
- Draw: 32 (3WC/4Q)
- Seeds: 8

Events
Singles	Doubles
← 1987 ·	Prague Open	· 1989 →

Marián Vajda was the defending champion, but lost in the first round to Martin Střelba.

Thomas Muster won the title by defeating Guillermo Pérez Roldán 6–4, 5–7, 6–2 in the final.

== Seeds ==
1. (Czechoslovakia) Miloslav Mečíř (quarterfinals)
2. (Argentina) Guillermo Pérez Roldán (final)
3. (Austria) Thomas Muster (champion)
4. (Czechoslovakia) Tomáš Šmíd (second round)
5. (United States) Lawson Duncan (quarterfinals)
6. (Czechoslovakia) Milan Šrejber (quarterfinals)
7. (Austria) Horst Skoff (second round)
8. (Soviet Union) Andrei Olhovskiy (second round)

== Draw ==
=== Key ===
- Q = Qualifier
- WC = Wild card
- LL = Lucky loser
- Alt = Alternate
- ITF = ITF entry
- PR = Protected ranking
- SR = Special ranking
- SE = Special exempt
- JE = Junior exempt
- JR = Junior Accelerator Programme entrant
- CO = College Accelerator Programme entrant
- NG = Next Gen Accelerator Program entrant
- w/o = Walkover
- r = Retired
- d = Defaulted

=== Finals ===
Semifinals
(Spain) Fernando Luna	2	1
3	(Austria) Thomas Muster	6	6
WC	(Czechoslovakia) Martin Střelba	1	1
2	(Argentina) Guillermo Pérez Roldán	6	6

Final
3	(Austria) Thomas Muster	6	5	6
2	(Argentina) Guillermo Pérez Roldán	4	7	2

=== Top half ===
First round
1	(Czechoslovakia) M Mečíř	6	6
(Czechoslovakia) P Korda	1	2
(West Germany) M Westphal	7	4	6
WC	(Czechoslovakia) T Anzari	5	6	4
(Spain) F Luna	6	6
WC	(Czechoslovakia) P Vízner	2	2
(Czechoslovakia) B Stankovič	1	1
7	(Austria) H Skoff	6	6
3	(Austria) T Muster	6	6
Q	(United States) G Bezecny	2	1
(Sweden) J Windahl	6	6
Q	(Czechoslovakia) J Bulant	2	4
(Czechoslovakia) J Čihák	4	6	6
(United Kingdom) S Shaw	6	4	3
(Portugal) J Cunha e Silva	0	6	1
5	(United States) L Duncan	6	1	6

Second round
1	(Czechoslovakia) M Mečíř	6	6
(West Germany) M Westphal	2	1
(Spain) F Luna	6	6
7	(Austria) H Skoff	3	1
3	(Austria) T Muster	6	6
(Sweden) J Windahl	2	3
(Czechoslovakia) J Čihák	3	5
5	(United States) L Duncan	6	7

Quarterfinals
1	(Czechoslovakia) M Mečíř	2	4
(Spain) F Luna	6	6
3	(Austria) T Muster	6	6
5	(United States) L Duncan	2	1

Semifinals
(Spain) F Luna	2	1
3	(Austria) T Muster	6	6

=== Bottom half ===
First round
6	(Czechoslovakia) M Šrejber	5	7	6
(United States) J Letts	7	5	3
(Czechoslovakia) L Pimek	6	5	6
(Czechoslovakia) J Navrátil	0	7	4
(Czechoslovakia) M Vajda	3	6
WC	(Czechoslovakia) M Střelba	6	7
(Argentina) F Yunis	6	1	4
4	(Czechoslovakia) T Šmíd	3	6	6
8	(Soviet Union) A Olhovskiy	6	6
(Italy) M Fioroni	4	2
(Czechoslovakia) K Nováček	6	6
(Sweden) P Lindgren	2	2
Q	(Czechoslovakia) R Vogel	5	7	4
Q	(Czechoslovakia) V Roubíček	7	6	6
(Soviet Union) A Cherkasov	2	7	6
2	(Argentina) G Pérez Roldán	6	5	7

Second round
6	(Czechoslovakia) M Šrejber	6	6
(Czechoslovakia) L Pimek	1	4
WC	(Czechoslovakia) M Střelba	5	6	6
4	(Czechoslovakia) T Šmíd	7	2	4
8	(Soviet Union) A Olhovskiy	1	6
(Czechoslovakia) K Nováček	6	7
Q	(Czechoslovakia) V Roubíček	2	1
2	(Argentina) G Pérez Roldán	6	6

Quarterfinals
6	(Czechoslovakia) M Šrejber	2	1
WC	(Czechoslovakia) M Střelba	6	6
(Czechoslovakia) K Nováček	4	4
2	(Argentina) G Pérez Roldán	6	6

Semifinals
WC	(Czechoslovakia) M Střelba	1	1
2	(Argentina) G Pérez Roldán	6	6
