= 1989 Czechoslovak Open – Doubles =

Doubles
- 1989 Czechoslovak Open

Final
- Champions: (Spain) Jordi Arrese (Austria) Horst Skoff
- Runners-up: (Czechoslovakia) Petr Korda (Czechoslovakia) Tomáš Šmíd
- Score: 6–4, 6–4

Details
- Draw: 16 (1WC)
- Seeds: 4

Events
Singles	Doubles
← 1988 ·	Prague Open (1987–1999)	· 1990 →

Petr Korda and Jaroslav Navrátil were the defending champions, but competed this year with different partners: Korda teamed up with Tomáš Šmíd, while Navrátil teamed up with Richard Vogel. Both pairs faced each other in the semifinals, where Korda and Šmíd won the match 6–4, 3–6, 6–3.

Jordi Arrese and Horst Skoff won the title by defeating Korda and Šmíd 6–4, 6–4 in the final.

== Seeds ==
1. (Czechoslovakia) Petr Korda / (Czechoslovakia) Tomáš Šmíd (final)
2. (Czechoslovakia) Václav Roubíček / (Czechoslovakia) Daniel Vacek (quarterfinals)
3. (Czechoslovakia) Jaroslav Navrátil / (Czechoslovakia) Richard Vogel (semifinals)
4. (Spain) Jordi Arrese / (Austria) Horst Skoff (champions)

== Draw ==
=== Key ===
- Q = Qualifier
- WC = Wild card
- LL = Lucky loser
- Alt = Alternate
- ITF = ITF entry
- PR = Protected ranking
- SR = Special ranking
- SE = Special exempt
- JE = Junior exempt
- JR = Junior Accelerator Programme entrant
- CO = College Accelerator Programme entrant
- NG = Next Gen Accelerator Program entrant
- w/o = Walkover
- r = Retired
- d = Defaulted

=== Draw ===
First round
1	(Czechoslovakia) P Korda (Czechoslovakia) T Šmíd	6	6
(Spain) J Aguilera (Argentina) G Rivas	0	1
(Spain) F Clavet (Argentina) G Giussani	2	0
(Czechoslovakia) J Bulant (Czechoslovakia) V Flégl	6	6
3	(Czechoslovakia) J Navrátil (Czechoslovakia) R Vogel	7	6
(United States) G Bezecny (Israel) G Bloom	6	2
(Argentina) E Bengoechea (Uruguay) M Filippini	4	3
(Czechoslovakia) K Nováček (Czechoslovakia) B Stankovič	6	6
(Czechoslovakia) D Rikl (Czechoslovakia) T Anzari	6	6
(Argentina) F Yunis (Argentina) JC Yunis	2	4
(Sweden) C Allgårdh (Sweden) T Nydahl	6	2
4	(Spain) J Arrese (Austria) H Skoff	7	6
(Argentina) R Azar (United States) L Duncan	0	2
(Czechoslovakia) S Doseděl (Soviet Union) Ģ Dzelde	6	6
WC	(Czechoslovakia) M Střelba (Czechoslovakia) P Vízner	3	4
2	(Czechoslovakia) V Roubíček (Czechoslovakia) D Vacek	6	6

Quarterfinals
1	(Czechoslovakia) P Korda (Czechoslovakia) T Šmíd	7	6
(Czechoslovakia) J Bulant (Czechoslovakia) V Flégl	6	3
3	(Czechoslovakia) J Navrátil (Czechoslovakia) R Vogel	7	6
(Czechoslovakia) K Nováček (Czechoslovakia) B Stankovič	6	4
(Czechoslovakia) D Rikl (Czechoslovakia) T Anzari	6	6
4	(Spain) J Arrese (Austria) H Skoff	7	7
(Czechoslovakia) S Doseděl (Soviet Union) Ģ Dzelde	6	5	7
2	(Czechoslovakia) V Roubíček (Czechoslovakia) D Vacek	3	7	5

Semifinals
1	(Czechoslovakia) P Korda (Czechoslovakia) T Šmíd	6	3	6
3	(Czechoslovakia) J Navrátil (Czechoslovakia) R Vogel	4	6	3
4	(Spain) J Arrese (Austria) H Skoff	3	6	6
(Czechoslovakia) S Doseděl (Soviet Union) Ģ Dzelde	6	2	3

Final
1	(Czechoslovakia) P Korda (Czechoslovakia) T Šmíd	4	4
4	(Spain) J Arrese (Austria) H Skoff	6	6
