= 1988 Cedok Open – Doubles =

Doubles
- 1988 Cedok Open

Final
- Champions: (Czechoslovakia) Petr Korda (Czechoslovakia) Jaroslav Navrátil
- Runners-up: (Austria) Thomas Muster (Austria) Horst Skoff
- Score: 7–5, 7–6

Details
- Draw: 16 (1WC)
- Seeds: 4

Events
Singles	Doubles
- Prague Open

Miloslav Mečíř and Tomáš Šmíd were the defending champions, but lost in the first round to Thomas Muster and Horst Skoff.

Petr Korda and Jaroslav Navrátil won the title by defeating Muster and Skoff 7–5, 7–6 in the final.

== Seeds ==
1. (Czechoslovakia) Miloslav Mečíř / (Czechoslovakia) Tomáš Šmíd (first round)
2. (Czechoslovakia) Petr Korda / (Czechoslovakia) Jaroslav Navrátil (champions)
3. (Czechoslovakia) Josef Čihák / (Czechoslovakia) Karel Nováček (semifinals)
4. (Portugal) João Cunha e Silva / (Sweden) Jörgen Windahl (quarterfinals)

== Draw ==
Key

- Q = Qualifier
- WC = Wild card
- LL = Lucky loser
- Alt = Alternate
- ITF = ITF entry
- PR = Protected ranking
- SR = Special ranking
- SE = Special exempt
- JE = Junior exempt
- JR = Junior Accelerator Programme entrant
- CO = College Accelerator Programme entrant
- NG = Next Gen Accelerator Program entrant
- w/o = Walkover
- r = Retired
- d = Defaulted

=== Draw ===
First round
1	(Czechoslovakia) M Mečíř (Czechoslovakia) T Šmíd	0	1
(Austria) T Muster (Austria) H Skoff	6	6
(Czechoslovakia) S Birner (Czechoslovakia) L Pimek	5	6
(Czechoslovakia) B Stankovič (Czechoslovakia) R Vogel	7	7
3	(Czechoslovakia) J Čihák (Czechoslovakia) K Nováček	7	7
(Czechoslovakia) V Roubíček (Czechoslovakia) M Střelba	5	6
(United States) L Duncan (Italy) M Fioroni	6	4	6
WC	(Czechoslovakia) T Anzari (Czechoslovakia) D Rikl	1	6	1
(United States) G Bezecny (United States) M Buckley	3	3
(Argentina) G Pérez Roldán (Czechoslovakia) M Vajda	6	6
(Czechoslovakia) S Doseděl (Czechoslovakia) P Vízner	2	1
4	(Portugal) J Cunha e Silva (Sweden) J Windahl	6	6
(Soviet Union) A Cherkasov (Soviet Union) A Olhovskiy	6	2	6
(United States) J Letts (United Kingdom) S Shaw	4	6	2
(Czechoslovakia) J Bulant (Czechoslovakia) V Flégl	6	4	1
2	(Czechoslovakia) P Korda (Czechoslovakia) J Navrátil	4	6	6

Quarterfinals
(Austria) T Muster (Austria) H Skoff	6	6
(Czechoslovakia) B Stankovič (Czechoslovakia) R Vogel	4	4
3	(Czechoslovakia) J Čihák (Czechoslovakia) K Nováček	0	6	6
(United States) L Duncan (Italy) M Fioroni	6	0	1
(Argentina) G Pérez Roldán (Czechoslovakia) M Vajda	6	6
4	(Portugal) J Cunha e Silva (Sweden) J Windahl	3	4
(Soviet Union) A Cherkasov (Soviet Union) A Olhovskiy	1	6	6
2	(Czechoslovakia) P Korda (Czechoslovakia) J Navrátil	6	2	7

Semifinals
(Austria) T Muster (Austria) H Skoff	6	6	6
3	(Czechoslovakia) J Čihák (Czechoslovakia) K Nováček	7	3	3
(Argentina) G Pérez Roldán (Czechoslovakia) M Vajda	1	3
2	(Czechoslovakia) P Korda (Czechoslovakia) J Navrátil	6	6

Final
(Austria) T Muster (Austria) H Skoff	5	6
2	(Czechoslovakia) P Korda (Czechoslovakia) J Navrátil	7	7
