= 1995 Skoda Czech Open – Doubles =

Doubles
- 1995 Skoda Czech Open

Final
- Champions: (Belgium) Libor Pimek (South Africa) Byron Talbot
- Runners-up: (Czech Republic) Jiří Novák (Czech Republic) David Rikl
- Score: 7–5, 1–6, 7–6

Details
- Draw: 16
- Seeds: 4

Events
Singles	Doubles
← 1994 ·	Prague Open	· 1996 →

Karel Nováček and Mats Wilander were the defending champions, but none competed this year.

Libor Pimek and Byron Talbot won the title by defeating Jiří Novák and David Rikl 7–5, 1–6, 7–6 in the final.

== Seeds ==
1. (Belgium) Libor Pimek / (South Africa) Byron Talbot (champions)
2. (Czech Republic) Jiří Novák / (Czech Republic) David Rikl (final)
3. (Czech Republic) Tomáš Krupa / (Czech Republic) Pavel Vízner (quarterfinals)
4. (Zimbabwe) Wayne Black / (Hungary) László Markovits (first round)

== Draw ==
=== Key ===
- Q = Qualifier
- WC = Wild card
- LL = Lucky loser
- Alt = Alternate
- SE = Special exempt
- PR = Protected ranking
- ITF = ITF entry
- JE = Junior exempt
- w/o = Walkover
- r = Retired
- d = Defaulted
- SR = Special ranking

=== Draw ===
First round
1	(Belgium) L Pimek (South Africa) B Talbot	3	6	6
(Italy) M Meneschincheri (Argentina) M Zabaleta	6	4	3
(Czech Republic) S Doseděl (Czech Republic) R Vašek
(Chile) S Cortés (Argentina) G Etlis	w/o
4	(Zimbabwe) W Black (Hungary) L Markovits	6	7	2
(France) H Leconte (Switzerland) M Rosset	7	5	6
(Czech Republic) P Pála (Czech Republic) D Škoch	6	6
(Czech Republic) V Flégl (Czech Republic) B Ulihrach	3	4
(Uzbekistan) O Ogorodov (Spain) A Portas	1	1
(Morocco) K Alami (Hungary) G Köves	6	6
(Czech Republic) D Miketa (Czech Republic) T Zíb	0	5
3	(Czech Republic) T Krupa (Czech Republic) P Vízner	6	7
(Czech Republic) J Kodeš Jr. (Slovakia) K Kučera	6	6
(Czech Republic) P Kudrnáč (Czech Republic) P Luxa	0	1
(Czech Republic) O Fukárek (Czech Republic) J Vaněk	2	1
2	(Czech Republic) J Novák (Czech Republic) D Rikl	6	6

Quarterfinals
1	(Belgium) L Pimek (South Africa) B Talbot	6	6
(Chile) S Cortés (Argentina) G Etlis	2	2
(France) H Leconte (Switzerland) M Rosset	7	2	0
(Czech Republic) P Pála (Czech Republic) D Škoch	6	6	6
(Morocco) K Alami (Hungary) G Köves	6	0	6
3	(Czech Republic) T Krupa (Czech Republic) P Vízner	1	6	2
(Czech Republic) J Kodeš Jr. (Slovakia) K Kučera	2	6
2	(Czech Republic) J Novák (Czech Republic) D Rikl	6	7

Semifinals
1	(Belgium) L Pimek (South Africa) B Talbot	7	6
(Czech Republic) P Pála (Czech Republic) D Škoch	6	2
(Morocco) K Alami (Hungary) G Köves	3	3
2	(Czech Republic) J Novák (Czech Republic) D Rikl	6	6

Final
1	(Belgium) L Pimek (South Africa) B Talbot	7	1	7
2	(Czech Republic) J Novák (Czech Republic) D Rikl	5	6	6
