= 1989 Czechoslovak Open – Singles =

Singles
- 1989 Czechoslovak Open

Final
- Champion: (Uruguay) Marcelo Filippini
- Runner-up: (Austria) Horst Skoff
- Score: 7–5, 7–6

Details
- Draw: 32 (3WC/4Q)
- Seeds: 8

Events
Singles	Doubles
← 1988 ·	Prague Open (1987–1999)	· 1990 →

Thomas Muster was the defending champion, but did not compete this year.

Marcelo Filippini won the title by defeating Horst Skoff 7–5, 7–6 in the final.

== Seeds ==
1. (Spain) Jordi Arrese (second round)
2. (Austria) Horst Skoff (final)
3. (Czechoslovakia) Karel Nováček (first round)
4. (Uruguay) Marcelo Filippini (champion)
5. (Czechoslovakia) Martin Střelba (quarterfinals)
6. (Argentina) Eduardo Bengoechea (second round)
7. (Spain) Fernando Luna (first round)
8. (United States) Lawson Duncan (first round)

== Draw ==
=== Key ===
- Q = Qualifier
- WC = Wild card
- LL = Lucky loser
- Alt = Alternate
- SE = Special exempt
- PR = Protected ranking
- ITF = ITF entry
- JE = Junior exempt
- w/o = Walkover
- r = Retired
- d = Defaulted
- SR = Special ranking

=== Finals ===
Semifinals
(Denmark) Michael Tauson	2	6	3
4	(Uruguay) Marcelo Filippini	6	2	6
(Argentina) Franco Davín	2	2
2	(Austria) Horst Skoff	6	6

Final
4	(Uruguay) Marcelo Filippini	7	7
2	(Austria) Horst Skoff	5	6

=== Top half ===
First round
1	(Spain) J Arrese	6	7
(Israel) G Bloom	2	6
(Czechoslovakia) P Korda	6	6
Q	(Soviet Union) Ģ Dzelde	2	0
(Sweden) T Haldin	2	6	1
(Denmark) M Tauson	6	1	6
(Argentina) G Giussani	5	6	7
8	(United States) L Duncan	7	0	5
4	(Uruguay) M Filippini	6	6
(Czechoslovakia) J Bulant	1	0
Q	(Czechoslovakia) Petr Hájek	4	6
(Argentina) G Rivas	6	7
(Spain) F Clavet	3	6	6
WC	(Czechoslovakia) S Doseděl	6	4	1
(Czechoslovakia) T Šmíd	3	4
5	(Czechoslovakia) M Střelba	6	6

Second round
1	(Spain) J Arrese	1	6
(Czechoslovakia) P Korda	6	7
(Denmark) M Tauson	7	5	6
(Argentina) G Giussani	6	7	4
4	(Uruguay) M Filippini	6	6
(Argentina) G Rivas	1	1
(Spain) F Clavet	2	6	1
5	(Czechoslovakia) M Střelba	6	2	6

Quarterfinals
(Czechoslovakia) P Korda	4	0
(Denmark) M Tauson	6	6
4	(Uruguay) M Filippini	6	6
5	(Czechoslovakia) M Střelba	3	4

Semifinals
(Denmark) M Tauson	2	6	3
4	(Uruguay) M Filippini	6	2	6

=== Bottom half ===
First round
6	(Argentina) E Bengoechea	6	6
WC	(Czechoslovakia) M Damm	0	2
(Spain) J Aguilera	6	6
WC	(Czechoslovakia) T Anzari	3	2
(Czechoslovakia) J Čihák	0^{r}
Q	(Czechoslovakia) V Roubíček	1
(Argentina) F Davín	6	5	6
3	(Czechoslovakia) K Nováček	1	7	3
7	(Spain) F Luna	6	2
Q	(Czechoslovakia) D Rikl	7	6
(Socialist Federal Republic of Yugoslavia) M Ostoja	6	6
(Sweden) T Nydahl	4	2
(Czechoslovakia) C Suk	6	6
(Argentina) R Azar	1	1
(Sweden) C Allgårdh	0	3
2	(Austria) H Skoff	6	6

Second round
6	(Argentina) E Bengoechea	4	6	4
(Spain) J Aguilera	6	3	6
Q	(Czechoslovakia) V Roubíček	4	2
(Argentina) F Davín	6	6
Q	(Czechoslovakia) D Rikl	2	6
(Socialist Federal Republic of Yugoslavia) M Ostoja	6	7
(Czechoslovakia) C Suk	4	6
2	(Austria) H Skoff	6	7

Quarterfinals
(Spain) J Aguilera	4	1
(Argentina) F Davín	6	6
(Socialist Federal Republic of Yugoslavia) M Ostoja	4	0
2	(Austria) H Skoff	6	6

Semifinals
(Argentina) F Davín	2	2
2	(Austria) H Skoff	6	6
