= 1994 Skoda Czech Open =

- Date: 1–7 August
- Edition: 8th
- Category: World Series
- Draw: 32S / 16D
- Prize money: $340,000
- Surface: Clay / outdoor
- Location: Prague, Czech Republic
- Venue: I. Czech Lawn Tennis Club

Champions

Singles
- (Spain) Sergi Bruguera

Doubles
- (Czech Republic) Karel Nováček / (Sweden) Mats Wilander
- Prague Open

The 1994 Skoda Czech Open, also known as the Prague Open, was a men's tennis tournament played on outdoor clay courts at the I. Czech Lawn Tennis Club in Prague, Czech Republic that was part of the ATP World Series of the 1994 ATP Tour. It was the eighth edition of the tournament and was held from 1 August until 7 August 1994. First-seeded Sergi Bruguera won his second successive singles title at the event.

== Finals ==
=== Singles ===
(Spain) Sergi Bruguera defeated (Ukraine) Andrei Medvedev 6–3, 6–4

- It was Bruguera's 3rd singles title of the year and the 14th of his career.

=== Doubles ===
(Czech Republic) Karel Nováček / (Sweden) Mats Wilander defeated (Czech Republic) Tomáš Krupa / (Czech Republic) Pavel Vízner walkover

== See also ==
- 1994 BVV Prague Open – women's tournament
