= 1995 Skoda Czech Open – Singles =

Singles
- 1995 Skoda Czech Open

Final
- Champion: (Czech Republic) Bohdan Ulihrach
- Runner-up: (Spain) Javier Sánchez
- Score: 6–2, 6–2

Details
- Draw: 32 (4Q/4WC/1LL)
- Seeds: 8

Events
Singles	Doubles
← 1994 ·	Prague Open	· 1996 →

Sergi Bruguera was the two-time defending champion but chose to compete at Kitzbühel during the same week, losing at the third round.

Bohdan Ulihrach won the title by defeating Javier Sánchez 6–2, 6–2 in the final.

== Seeds ==
1. (Switzerland) Marc Rosset (quarterfinals)
2. (Ukraine) Andrei Medvedev (first round, retired)
3. (n/a)
4. (Slovakia) Karol Kučera (second round)
5. (Norway) Christian Ruud (first round)
6. (Czech Republic) Sláva Doseděl (second round)
7. (Spain) Javier Sánchez (final)
8. (Peru) Jaime Yzaga (first round)

== Draw ==
=== Key ===
- Q = Qualifier
- WC = Wild card
- LL = Lucky loser
- Alt = Alternate
- SE = Special exempt
- PR = Protected ranking
- ITF = ITF entry
- JE = Junior exempt
- w/o = Walkover
- r = Retired
- d = Defaulted
- SR = Special ranking

=== Finals ===
Semifinals
7	(Spain) Javier Sánchez	3	6	6
(Spain) Albert Portas	6	1	4
(Czech Republic) Bohdan Ulihrach	6	6
(Sweden) Nicklas Kulti	4	4

Final
7	(Spain) Javier Sánchez	2	2
(Czech Republic) Bohdan Ulihrach	6	6

=== Top half ===
First round
1	(Switzerland) M Rosset	6	1	6
WC	(Czech Republic) J Bulant	1	6	4
(Czech Republic) D Škoch	0	6	6
(Slovakia) J Krošlák	6	1	2
(Czech Republic) D Rikl	6	6
(Czech Republic) J Novák	3	1
(Haiti) R Agénor	6	2	3
7	(Spain) J Sánchez	4	6	6
4	(Slovakia) K Kučera	6	1	6
WC	(Russia) A Cherkasov	3	6	1
Q	(Spain) M Górriz	2	4
(Spain) A Portas	6	6
(Morocco) K Alami	7^{7}	6
Q	(Czech Republic) D Miketa	6^{2}	0
(Argentina) H Gumy	4	6	6
5	(Norway) C Ruud	6	1	3

Second round
1	(Switzerland) M Rosset	7^{7}	7
(Czech Republic) D Škoch	6^{3}	5
(Czech Republic) D Rikl	6^{6}	1
7	(Spain) J Sánchez	7^{8}	6
4	(Slovakia) K Kučera	2	6	0
(Spain) A Portas	6	2	6
(Morocco) K Alami	6	6
(Argentina) H Gumy	2	4

Quarterfinals
1	(Switzerland) M Rosset	4	4
7	(Spain) J Sánchez	6	6
(Spain) A Portas	4	7^{7}	6
(Morocco) K Alami	6	6^{4}	1

Semifinals
7	(Spain) J Sánchez	3	6	6
(Spain) A Portas	6	1	4

=== Bottom half ===
First round
6	(Czech Republic) S Doseděl	6	6
WC	(France) H Leconte	1	3
Q	(Italy) M Meneschincheri	4	1
(Czech Republic) B Ulihrach	6	6
(Spain) Ó Martínez	4	4
(Argentina) G Etlis	6	6
(Argentina) F Davín	3	6	3
LL	(Uzbekistan) O Ogorodov	6	3	6
8	(Peru) J Yzaga	6	6^{6}	3
(Chile) S Cortés	4	7^{8}	6
(Poland) W Kowalski	4	6	6^{3}
Q	(Argentina) M Zabaleta	6	1	7^{7}
(Czech Republic) R Vašek	4	6	4
WC	(Czech Republic) J Vaněk	6	4	6
(Sweden) N Kulti	7
2	(Ukraine) A Medvedev	5	r

Second round
6	(Czech Republic) S Doseděl	6	2	5
(Czech Republic) B Ulihrach	0	6	7
(Argentina) G Etlis	6	6
LL	(Uzbekistan) O Ogorodov	4	2
(Chile) S Cortés	4	4
Q	(Argentina) M Zabaleta	6	6
WC	(Czech Republic) J Vaněk	0	4
(Sweden) N Kulti	6	6

Quarterfinals
(Czech Republic) B Ulihrach	6	7
(Argentina) G Etlis	3	5
Q	(Argentina) M Zabaleta	2	1
(Sweden) N Kulti	6	6

Semifinals
(Czech Republic) B Ulihrach	6	6
(Sweden) N Kulti	4	4
