= 1988 Cedok Open =

- Date: 8–14 August
- Edition: 2nd
- Category: Grand Prix
- Draw: 32S / 16D
- Prize money: $140,000
- Surface: Clay / outdoor
- Location: Prague, Czechoslovakia
- Venue: I. Czech Lawn Tennis Club

Champions

Singles
- (Austria) Thomas Muster

Doubles
- (Czechoslovakia) Petr Korda / (Czechoslovakia) Jaroslav Navrátil
- Prague Open

The 1988 Cedok Open, also known as the Prague Open, was a men's tennis tournament played on outdoor clay courts at the I. Czech Lawn Tennis Club in Prague, Czechoslovakia that was part of the 1988 Grand Prix circuit. It was the second edition of the tournament and was held from 8 August until 14 August 1988. Third-seeded Thomas Muster won the singles title.

== Finals ==
=== Singles ===
(Austria) Thomas Muster defeated (Argentina) Guillermo Pérez Roldán 6–4, 5–7, 6–2

- It was Muster's 3rd singles title of the year and the 4th of his career.

=== Doubles ===
(Czechoslovakia) Petr Korda / (Czechoslovakia) Jaroslav Navrátil defeated (Austria) Thomas Muster / (Austria) Horst Skoff 7–5, 7–6
