= 1994 Skoda Czech Open – Singles =

Singles
- 1994 Skoda Czech Open

Final
- Champion: (Spain) Sergi Bruguera
- Runner-up: (Ukraine) Andrei Medvedev
- Score: 6–3, 6–4

Details
- Draw: 32 (3WC/4Q)
- Seeds: 8

Events
Singles	Doubles
← 1993 ·	Prague Open	· 1995 →

The 1994 Skoda Czech Open was a men's tennis tournament played on Clay in Prague, Czech Republic that was part of the International Series of the 1994 ATP Tour. Sergi Bruguera successfully defended his title, by defeating Andrei Medvedev 6–3, 6–4 in the final.

== Seeds ==
1. (Spain) Sergi Bruguera (champion)
2. (Ukraine) Andrei Medvedev (final)
3. (Czech Republic) Sláva Doseděl (semifinals)
4. (Russia) Andrei Chesnokov (quarterfinals)
5. (Spain) Àlex Corretja (quarterfinals)
6. (Spain) Carlos Costa (semifinals)
7. (Czech Republic) Karel Nováček (quarterfinals)
8. (Morocco) Karim Alami (first round)

== Draw ==
=== Key ===
- Q = Qualifier
- WC = Wild card
- LL = Lucky loser
- Alt = Alternate
- SE = Special exempt
- PR = Protected ranking
- ITF = ITF entry
- JE = Junior exempt
- w/o = Walkover
- r = Retired
- d = Defaulted
- SR = Special ranking

=== Finals ===
Semifinals
1	(Spain) Sergi Bruguera	6	6
6	(Spain) Albert Costa	1	3
3	(Czech Republic) Sláva Doseděl	3	1
2	(Ukraine) Andrei Medvedev	6	6

Final
1	(Spain) Sergi Bruguera	6	6
2	(Ukraine) Andrei Medvedev	3	4

=== Top half ===
First round
1	(Spain) S Bruguera	6^{0}	6	6
WC	(Czech Republic) J Novák	7^{7}	1	1
(Hungary) J Krocskó	6	4	6
(Spain) F Roig	1	6	4
(Portugal) N Marques	1	1
(Germany) MK Goellner	6	6
(Sweden) M Wilander	5	1
7	(Czech Republic) K Nováček	7	6
4	(Russia) A Chesnokov	6	6
Q	(Uzbekistan) O Ogorodov	4	1
(Australia) B Larkham	6	5	6
(Argentina) H Gumy	3	7	4
(Portugal) J Cunha e Silva	7^{8}	6
(Israel) G Bloom	6^{6}	4
(Brazil) J Oncins	3	7	3
6	(Spain) A Costa	6	5	6

Second round
1	(Spain) S Bruguera	6	6
(Hungary) J Krocskó	1	1
(Germany) MK Goellner	5	6	6^{2}
7	(Czech Republic) K Nováček	7	3	7^{7}
4	(Russia) A Chesnokov	6	6
(Australia) B Larkham	2	1
(Portugal) J Cunha e Silva	0	6	1
6	(Spain) A Costa	6	0	6

Quarterfinals
1	(Spain) S Bruguera	6	6
7	(Czech Republic) K Nováček	2	2
4	(Russia) A Chesnokov	3	1
6	(Spain) A Costa	6	6

Semifinals
1	(Spain) S Bruguera	6	6
6	(Spain) A Costa	1	3

=== Bottom half ===
First round
5	(Spain) À Corretja	3	6	6
Q	(Spain) F Mantilla	6	4	3
(Austria) T Gollwitzer	0	3
(Norway) C Ruud	6	6
WC	(Czech Republic) B Ulihrach	2	3
Q	(Sweden) O Kristiansson	6	6
Q	(Spain) A Mancisidor	3	2
3	(Czech Republic) S Doseděl	6	6
8	(Morocco) K Alami	2	5
(Spain) Ó Martínez	6	7
(Spain) J Gisbert Schultze	6	6
(United States) M Blackman	4	2
(Netherlands) F Wibier	3	3
WC	(Czech Republic) D Škoch	6	6
(Australia) P Tramacchi	6^{6}	0
2	(Ukraine) A Medvedev	7^{8}	6

Second round
5	(Spain) À Corretja	6^{2}	6	6
(Norway) C Ruud	7^{7}	4	3
Q	(Sweden) O Kristiansson	6	1	2
3	(Czech Republic) S Doseděl	4	6	6
(Spain) Ó Martínez	6	6
(Spain) J Gisbert Schultze	0	4
WC	(Czech Republic) D Škoch	4	1
2	(Ukraine) A Medvedev	6	6

Quarterfinals
5	(Spain) À Corretja	6	3	5
3	(Czech Republic) S Doseděl	1	6	7
(Spain) Ó Martínez	6^{6}	3
2	(Ukraine) A Medvedev	7^{8}	6

Semifinals
3	(Czech Republic) S Doseděl	3	1
2	(Ukraine) A Medvedev	6	6
