= Neu-Ulm Challenger =

ATP Challenger Tour
- Location: Ulm, Germany
- Venue: SSV Ulm 1846
- Category: ATP Challenger (1982–2002)
- Surface: Clay

The Neu-Ulm Challenger (1982-1992) respectively Ulm Challenger (1993-2002) was a professional tennis tournament in Germany played on clay courts that was part of the ATP Challenger Series. It was held annually in Neu-Ulm, Bavaria and later in Ulm, Baden Württemberg from 1982 to 2002.

== Past finals ==
=== Singles ===
Year	Champion	Runner-up	Score
1982	(West Germany) Karl Meiler	(United States) Scott Lipton	2–6, 7–6, 6–1
1983	(Czechoslovakia) Tomáš Šmíd	(Australia) Trevor Allan	7–5, 6–4
1984	(Sweden) Kent Carlsson	(Ecuador) Raúl Viver	6–3, 6–1
1985	(Czechoslovakia) Milan Šrejber	(Sweden) Kent Carlsson	0–6, 6–4, 6–2
1986	(Italy) Simone Colombo	(Israel) Gilad Bloom	6–7, 6–4, 6–1
1987	(Czechoslovakia) Tomáš Šmíd	(France) Thierry Champion	6–3, 6–4
1988	(Ecuador) Raúl Viver	(Sweden) Stefan Eriksson	7–5, 6–2
1989	(West Germany) Ricki Osterthun	(Italy) Simone Colombo	5–1, retired
1990	(Soviet Union) Dimitri Poliakov	(Belgium) Bart Wuyts	3–6, 7–5, 6–3
1991	(France) Rodolphe Gilbert	(Sweden) Tomas Nydahl	6–2, 6–4
1992	(South Africa) Marcos Ondruska	(Germany) Marc-Kevin Goellner	7–6, 6–1
1993	(Germany) David Prinosil	(France) Olivier Delaître	6–3, 6–3
1994	(Spain) Óscar Martínez	(Czech Republic) Václav Roubíček	6–1, 6–1
1995	(Germany) Carl-Uwe Steeb	(Morocco) Karim Alami	4–6, 7–6, 6-0
1996	(Belgium) Kris Goossens	(Morocco) Karim Alami	6–4, 6-0
1997	(Romania) Dinu Pescariu	(Austria) Stefan Koubek	7–5, 6-1
1998	(Morocco) Younes El Aynaoui (1)	(Romania) Dinu Pescariu	6–4, 6-3
1999	(Morocco) Younes El Aynaoui (2)	(Australia) Andrew Ilie	7-6^{4}, 6-3
2000	(Spain) Germán Puentes	(Spain) David Sánchez	6–3, 6-3
2001	(Russia) Nikolay Davydenko	(Georgia (country)) Irakli Labadze	4–6, 7-6^{2}, 7-5
2002	(Germany) Oliver Gross	(Netherlands) Martin Verkerk	7-6^{5}, 4–6, 6-3

=== Doubles ===
Year	Champions	Runners-up	Score
1982	(West Germany) Karl Meiler (Czechoslovakia) Jaroslav Navrátil	(Czechoslovakia) Dusan Kulhaj (United States) John Van Nostrand	6–3, 6–3
1983	(Switzerland) Heinz Günthardt (Hungary) Balázs Taróczy	(United Kingdom) Andrew Jarrett (United Kingdom) Jonathan Smith	6–2, 6–4
1984	(West Germany) Stefan Hermann (South Africa) Brian Levine	(Brazil) Eduardo Oncins (Brazil) Fernando Roese	6–4, 7–5
1985	(New Zealand) David Mustard (United Kingdom) Jonathan Smith	(West Germany) Tore Meinecke (West Germany) Ricki Osterthun	6–3, 4–6, 6–4
1986	(Iran) Mansour Bahrami (Czechoslovakia) Jaroslav Navrátil	(Netherlands) Menno Oosting (Netherlands) Huub van Boeckel	7–5, 6–1
1987	Not held		
1988	(West Germany) Michael Stich (West Germany) Martin Sinner	(Switzerland) Heinz Günthardt (Hungary) Balázs Taróczy	6–3, 6–4
1989	(Czechoslovakia) Jaroslav Navrátil (West Germany) Christian Weis	(Italy) Simone Colombo (Italy) Nevio Devide	walkover
1990	(Italy) Massimo Cierro (Italy) Simone Colombo	(Romania) George Cosac (Czechoslovakia) Vojtěch Flégl	0–6, 6–2, 6–1
1991	(France) Tarik Benhabiles (France) Olivier Delaître	(Australia) Carl Limberger (Italy) Diego Nargiso	6–4, 7–6
1992	(Argentina) Gustavo Luza (Argentina) Daniel Orsanic	(New Zealand) Bruce Derlin (New Zealand) Steve Guy	6–3, 6–2
1993	(Germany) David Prinosil (Czech Republic) Richard Vogel	(Mexico) Jorge Lozano (Germany) Udo Riglewski	6–1, 6–3
1994	(United States) Donald Johnson (United States) Jack Waite	(Georgia (country)) Vladimir Gabrichidze (Russia) Andrei Merinov	4–6, 6–2, 6–0
1995	(Argentina) Pablo Albano (Netherlands) Tom Kempers	(Morocco) Karim Alami (Hungary) Gábor Köves	6–7, 6–4, 6–4
1996	(Germany) Karsten Braasch (Germany) Jens Knippschild	(Latvia) Ģirts Dzelde (North Macedonia) Aleksandar Kitinov	7-5, 6–3
1997	(Belgium) Kris Goossens (Belgium) Tom Vanhoudt	(Czech Republic) Petr Luxa (Czech Republic) Petr Pála	6-3, 6–0
1998	(Brazil) Márcio Carlsson (Brazil) Jaime Oncins	(Germany) Dirk Dier (Germany) Michael Kohlmann	6-4, 6–7, 6-3
1999	(Australia) Andrew Painter (South Africa) Byron Talbot	(Germany) Dirk Dier (Germany) Michael Kohlmann	6-3, 6–4
2000	(Bulgaria) Orlin Stanoytchev (Russia) Mikhail Youzhny	(Germany) Tomas Behrend (Germany) Karsten Braasch	6-7^{2}, 7–5, 6–0
2001	(Czech Republic) František Čermák (Czech Republic) David Škoch	(United States) Brandon Coupe (Australia) Tim Crichton	6-2, 6–4
2002	(Czech Republic) Leoš Friedl (Czech Republic) David Škoch	(Australia) Tim Crichton (Australia) Todd Perry	6-3, 4–6, 7-5
