= 1994 Skoda Czech Open – Doubles =

Doubles
- 1994 Skoda Czech Open

Final
- Champions: (Czech Republic) Karel Nováček (Sweden) Mats Wilander
- Runners-up: (Czech Republic) Tomáš Krupa (Czech Republic) Pavel Vízner
- Score: Walkover

Events
Singles	Doubles
← 1993 ·	Prague Open	· 1995 →

The 1994 Skoda Czech Open was a men's tennis tournament played on Clay in Prague, Czech Republic that was part of the International Series of the 1994 ATP Tour. Hendrik Jan Davids and Libor Pimek were the defending champions, but Davids did not compete this year. Pimek teamed up with Francisco Roig and lost in the semifinals to Tomáš Krupa and Pavel Vízner.

Karel Nováček and Mats Wilander won the title after their opponents, Krupa and Vízner, were forced to withdraw before the final match.

== Seeds ==
1. (Belgium) Libor Pimek / (Spain) Francisco Roig (semifinals)
2. (Czech Republic) Vojtěch Flégl / (Australia) Andrew Florent (quarterfinals)
3. (United Kingdom) Neil Broad / (United States) Greg Van Emburgh (semifinals)
4. (Latvia) Ģirts Dzelde / (Malaysia) Adam Malik (first round)

== Draw ==
=== Key ===
- Q = Qualifier
- WC = Wild card
- LL = Lucky loser
- Alt = Alternate
- SE = Special exempt
- PR = Protected ranking
- ITF = ITF entry
- JE = Junior exempt
- w/o = Walkover
- r = Retired
- d = Defaulted
- SR = Special ranking

=== Draw ===
First round
1	(Belgium) L Pimek (Spain) F Roig	6	6
WC	(Czech Republic) J Novák (Czech Republic) R Vašek	2	2
WC	(Czech Republic) D Miketa (Czech Republic) D Škoch	6	1	6
(United States) M Blackman (Israel) G Bloom	4	6	3
4	(Latvia) Ģ Dzelde (Malaysia) A Malik	3	2
(Czech Republic) T Krupa (Czech Republic) P Vízner	6	6
(Argentina) H Gumy (Brazil) J Oncins	2	6	6
(North Macedonia) A Kitinov (Czech Republic) J Kodeš Jr.	6	2	7
(Australia) W Arthurs (Australia) B Larkham	4	3
Q	(Morocco) K Alami (Hungary) A Lányi	6	6
(South Africa) B Curry (South Africa) K Haygarth	4	5
3	(United Kingdom) N Broad (United States) G Van Emburgh	6	7
WC	(Czech Republic) S Doseděl (Czech Republic) B Ulhirach	6	3	3
(Czech Republic) K Nováček (Sweden) M Wilander	4	6	6
(Portugal) J Cunha e Silva (Portugal) N Marques	5	7	5
2	(Czech Republic) V Flégl (Australia) A Florent	7	6	7

Quarterfinals
1	(Belgium) L Pimek (Spain) F Roig	6	7
WC	(Czech Republic) D Miketa (Czech Republic) D Škoch	2	6
(Czech Republic) T Krupa (Czech Republic) P Vízner	4	7	6
(North Macedonia) A Kitinov (Czech Republic) J Kodeš Jr.	6	6	2
Q	(Morocco) K Alami (Hungary) A Lányi	6	3	1
3	(United Kingdom) N Broad (United States) G Van Emburgh	4	6	6
(Czech Republic) K Nováček (Sweden) M Wilander	6	7
2	(Czech Republic) V Flégl (Australia) A Florent	2	6

Semifinals
1	(Belgium) L Pimek (Spain) F Roig	4	4
(Czech Republic) T Krupa (Czech Republic) P Vízner	6	6
3	(United Kingdom) N Broad (United States) G Van Emburgh	6	6
(Czech Republic) K Nováček (Sweden) M Wilander	7	7

Final
(Czech Republic) T Krupa (Czech Republic) P Vízner
(Czech Republic) K Nováček (Sweden) M Wilander	w/o
