= 1995 Skoda Czech Open =

- Date: 31 July – 6 August
- Edition: 9th
- Category: World Series
- Draw: 32S / 16D
- Prize money: $340,000
- Surface: Clay / outdoor
- Location: Prague, Czech Republic
- Venue: I. Czech Lawn Tennis Club

Champions

Singles
- (Czech Republic) Bohdan Ulihrach

Doubles
- (Belgium) Libor Pimek / (South Africa) Byron Talbot
- Prague Open

The 1995 Skoda Czech Open, also known as the Prague Open, was a men's tennis tournament played on outdoor clay courts at the I. Czech Lawn Tennis Club in Prague, Czech Republic that was part of the ATP World Series of the 1995 ATP Tour. It was the ninth edition of the tournament and was held from 31 July until 6 August 1995. Unseeded Bohdan Ulihrach won the singles title.

== Finals ==
=== Singles ===
(Czech Republic) Bohdan Ulihrach defeated (Spain) Javier Sánchez 6–2, 6–2

- It was Ulihrach's first singles title of his career.

=== Doubles ===
(Belgium) Libor Pimek / (South Africa) Byron Talbot defeated (Czech Republic) Jiří Novák / (Czech Republic) David Rikl 7–5, 1–6, 7–6

== See also ==
- 1995 Prague Open – women's tournament
