= 1989 Czechoslovak Open =

- Date: 7–13 August
- Edition: 3rd
- Category: Grand Prix
- Draw: 32S / 16D
- Prize money: $140,000
- Surface: Clay / outdoor
- Location: Prague, Czechoslovakia
- Venue: I. Czech Lawn Tennis Club

Champions

Singles
- (Uruguay) Marcelo Filippini

Doubles
- (Spain) Jordi Arrese / (Austria) Horst Skoff
- Prague Open

The 1989 Czechoslovak Open, also known as the Prague Open was a men's tennis tournament played on outdoor clay courts at the I. Czech Lawn Tennis Club in Prague, Czechoslovakia that was part of the 1989 Grand Prix circuit. It was the third edition of the tournament and was held from 7 August until 13 August 1989. Fourth-seeded Marcelo Filippini won the singles title.

== Finals ==
=== Singles ===
(Uruguay) Marcelo Filippini defeated (Austria) Horst Skoff 7–5, 7–6

- It was Filippini's 1st singles title of the year and the 2nd of his career.

=== Doubles ===
(Spain) Jordi Arrese / (Austria) Horst Skoff defeated (Czechoslovakia) Petr Korda / (Czechoslovakia) Tomáš Šmíd 6–4, 6–4
