= 1994 Davis Cup Europe/Africa Zone Group III – Zone B =

International tennis competition

Zone B of the 1994 Davis Cup Europe/Africa Group III was one of two zones in the Europe/Africa Group III of the 1994 Davis Cup. 8 teams competed across two pools in a round robin competition; the top two teams in each pool progressed to the promotion play-offs, where they played for advancement to Group II in 1995.

== Participating nations ==
- Congo
- Cyprus
- Lithuania
- Malta
- Slovakia
- Sudan
- Tunisia
- Turkey

=== Draw ===
- Venue: SSI Slovan Tennis Club, Bratislava, Slovakia
- Date: 18–22 May

Group A

	SVK	MLT	TUR	SUD	RR; W–L	Match; W–L	Set; W–L	Standings
Slovakia		3–0	3–0	3–0	3–0	9–0 (100%)	18–0 (100%)	1
Malta	0–3		2–1	3–0	2–1	5–4 (56%)	10–9 (53%)	2
Turkey	0–3	1–2		3–0	1–2	4–5 (44%)	9–10 (47%)	3
Sudan	0–3	0–3	0–3		0–3	0–9 (0%)	0–18 (0%)	4

Group B

	LTU	TUN	CYP	CGO	RR; W–L	Match; W–L	Set; W–L	Standings
Lithuania		3–0	2–1	3–0	3–0	8–1 (89%)	16–4 (80%)	1
Tunisia	0–3		2–1	3–0	2–1	5–4 (56%)	12–9 (57%)	2
Cyprus	1–2	1–2		3–0	1–2	5–4 (56%)	11–9 (55%)	3
Congo	0–3	0–3	0–3		0–3	0–9 (0%)	1–18 (5%)	4

1st to 4th place play-offs

3rd-4th Play-off
B2	Tunisia	2
A2	Malta	1

Semifinals
A1	Slovakia	3
B2	Tunisia	0
B1	Lithuania	2
A2	Malta	1

Final
A1	Slovakia	3
B1	Lithuania	0

5th to 8th place play-offs

7th-8th Play-off
B4	Congo	1
A4	Sudan	2

5th-8th Play-offs
A3	Turkey	3
B4	Congo	0
B3	Cyprus	3
A4	Sudan	0

5th-6th Play-off
A3	Turkey	2
B3	Cyprus	1

=== Final standings ===
Rank	Team
1	Slovakia
2	Lithuania
3	Tunisia
4	Malta
5	Turkey
6	Cyprus
7	Sudan
8	Congo

- Slovakia and Lithuania promoted to Group II in 1995.

== Round robin ==
=== Group A ===
==== Malta vs. Slovakia ====
Malta
0
SSI Slovan Tennis Club, Bratislava, Slovakia
18 May 1994

Slovakia
3

			1	2	3
1	(Malta) (Slovakia)	Gordon Asciak; Marián Vajda	2; 6	1; 6
2	(Malta) (Slovakia)	Steven Schranz; Karol Kučera	3; 6	0; 6
3	(Malta) (Slovakia)	Gordon Asciak / Mark Schembri; Ján Krošlák / Branislav Stankovič	3; 6	2; 6

==== Sudan vs. Turkey ====
Sudan
0
SSI Slovan Tennis Club, Bratislava, Slovakia
18 May 1994

Turkey
3

			1	2	3
1	(Sudan) (Turkey)	Asim Omar El-Agraa; Barış Ergün	1; 6	1; 6
2	(Sudan) (Turkey)	Mandour Abdalla; Berk Albayrak	0; 6	2; 6
3	(Sudan) (Turkey)	Mandour Abdalla / Khalid Farid; Barış Ergün / Alaaddin Karagöz	0; 6	2; 6

==== Malta vs. Turkey ====
Malta
2
SSI Slovan Tennis Club, Bratislava, Slovakia
19 May 1994

Turkey
1

			1	2	3
1	(Malta) (Turkey)	Gordon Asciak; Mustafa Azkara	7^{7} 6^{3}	6; 3
2	(Malta) (Turkey)	Steven Schranz; Alaaddin Karagöz	1; 6	5; 7
3	(Malta) (Turkey)	Gordon Asciak / Mark Schembri; Barış Ergün / Alaaddin Karagöz	6; 4	3; 6	6; 3

==== Sudan vs. Slovakia ====
Sudan
0
SSI Slovan Tennis Club, Bratislava, Slovakia
19 May 1994

Slovakia
3

			1	2	3
1	(Sudan) (Slovakia)	Asim Omar El-Agraa; Ján Krošlák	0; 6	0; 6
2	(Sudan) (Slovakia)	Mandour Abdalla; Karol Kučera	1; 6	1; 6
3	(Sudan) (Slovakia)	Mandour Abdalla / Abbas Jeha; Ján Krošlák / Branislav Stankovič	0; 6	2; 6

==== Malta vs. Sudan ====
Malta
3
SSI Slovan Tennis Club, Bratislava, Slovakia
20 May 1994

Sudan
0

			1	2	3
1	(Malta) (Sudan)	Gordon Asciak; Asim Omar El-Agraa	6; 2	6; 1
2	(Malta) (Sudan)	Steven Schranz; Mandour Abdalla	6; 0	7; 5
3	(Malta) (Sudan)	Daryl Delicata / Mark Schembri; Khalid Farid / Abbas Jeha	6; 4	6; 2

==== Slovakia vs. Turkey ====
Slovakia
3
SSI Slovan Tennis Club, Bratislava, Slovakia
20 May 1994

Turkey
0

			1	2	3
1	(Slovakia) (Turkey)	Marián Vajda; Barış Ergün	6; 2	6; 0
2	(Slovakia) (Turkey)	Karol Kučera; Alaaddin Karagöz	6; 3	6; 2
3	(Slovakia) (Turkey)	Karol Kučera / Branislav Stankovič; Berk Albayrak / Mustafa Azkara	6; 3	6; 0

=== Group B ===
==== Congo vs. Cyprus ====
Congo
0
SSI Slovan Tennis Club, Bratislava, Slovakia
18 May 1994

Cyprus
3

			1	2	3
1	(Republic of the Congo) (Cyprus)	Alain Bemba; Alkis Papamichael	1; 6	2; 6
2	(Republic of the Congo) (Cyprus)	Christian Bemba; Marinos Baghdatis	4; 6	1; 6
3	(Republic of the Congo) (Cyprus)	Alain Bemba / Crépin Ossombi; Loucas Christophides / Demetrios Leontis	4; 6	2; 6

==== Lithuania vs. Tunisia ====
Lithuania
3
SSI Slovan Tennis Club, Bratislava, Slovakia
18 May 1994

Tunisia
0

			1	2	3
1	(Lithuania) (Tunisia)	Gitanas Mažonas; Amine Nabli	6; 1	6; 2
2	(Lithuania) (Tunisia)	Rolandas Muraška; Adel Lahdhiri	6; 1	6; 3
3	(Lithuania) (Tunisia)	Gitanas Mažonas / Rolandas Muraška; Adel Lahdhiri / Amine Nabli	6; 3	6^{3} 7^{7}	6; 1

==== Congo vs. Tunisia ====
Congo
0
SSI Slovan Tennis Club, Bratislava, Slovakia
19 May 1994

Tunisia
3

			1	2	3
1	(Republic of the Congo) (Tunisia)	Crépin Ossombi; Sami Sidia	1; 6	1; 6
2	(Republic of the Congo) (Tunisia)	Christian Bemba; Adel Lahdhiri	2; 6	3; 6
3	(Republic of the Congo) (Tunisia)	Christian Bemba / Crépin Ossombi; Amine Nabli / Sami Sidia	0; 6	6^{3} 7^{7}

==== Cyprus vs. Lithuania ====
Cyprus
1
SSI Slovan Tennis Club, Bratislava, Slovakia
19 May 1994

Lithuania
2

			1	2	3
1	(Cyprus) (Lithuania)	Alkis Papamichael; Gitanas Mažonas	6^{5} 7^{7}	1; 6
2	(Cyprus) (Lithuania)	Marinos Baghdatis; Rolandas Muraška	1; 6	4; 6
3	(Cyprus) (Lithuania)	Loucas Christophides / Demetrios Leontis; Denis Ivancovas / Giedrius Vėželis	6; 2	7; 5

==== Congo vs. Lithuania ====
Congo
0
SSI Slovan Tennis Club, Bratislava, Slovakia
20 May 1994

Lithuania
3

			1	2	3
1	(Republic of the Congo) (Lithuania)	Crépin Ossombi; Giedrius Vėželis	1; 6	1; 6
2	(Republic of the Congo) (Lithuania)	Christian Bemba; Denis Ivancovas	6; 3	5; 7	4; 6
3	(Republic of the Congo) (Lithuania)	Christian Bemba / Crépin Ossombi; Gitanas Mažonas / Rolandas Muraška	1; 6	4; 6

==== Cyprus vs. Tunisia ====
Cyprus
1
SSI Slovan Tennis Club, Bratislava, Slovakia
20 May 1994

Tunisia
2

			1	2	3
1	(Cyprus) (Tunisia)	Alkis Papamichael; Amine Nabli	6; 2	4; 6	2; 6
2	(Cyprus) (Tunisia)	Marinos Baghdatis; Adel Lahdhiri	2; 6	4; 6
3	(Cyprus) (Tunisia)	Loucas Christophides / Demetrios Leontis; Adel Lahdhiri / Sami Sidia	6; 3	6^{7} 7^{9}	6; 4

== 1st to 4th place play-offs ==
=== Semifinals ===
==== Slovakia vs. Tunisia ====
Slovakia
3
SSI Slovan Tennis Club, Bratislava, Slovakia
21 May 1994

Tunisia
0

			1	2	3
1	(Slovakia) (Tunisia)	Marián Vajda; Sami Sidia	6; 0	6; 0
2	(Slovakia) (Tunisia)	Karol Kučera; Amine Nabli	6; 0	6; 0
3	(Slovakia) (Tunisia)	Ján Krošlák / Branislav Stankovič; Aref Jallali / Adel Lahdhiri	6; 1	6; 1

==== Lithuania vs. Malta ====
Lithuania
2
SSI Slovan Tennis Club, Bratislava, Slovakia
21 May 1994

Malta
1

			1	2	3
1	(Lithuania) (Malta)	Gitanas Mažonas; Gordon Asciak	2; 6	5; 7
2	(Lithuania) (Malta)	Rolandas Muraška; Steven Schranz	6; 2	6; 4
3	(Lithuania) (Malta)	Gitanas Mažonas / Rolandas Muraška; Gordon Asciak / Mark Schembri	7; 5	7^{7} 6^{5}

=== Final ===
==== Lithuania vs. Slovakia ====
Lithuania
0
SSI Slovan Tennis Club, Bratislava, Slovakia
22 May 1994

Slovakia
3

			1	2	3
1	(Lithuania) (Slovakia)	Gitanas Mažonas; Ján Krošlák	2; 6	1; 6
2	(Lithuania) (Slovakia)	Rolandas Muraška; Marián Vajda	2; 6	4; 6
3	(Lithuania) (Slovakia)	Rolandas Muraška / Giedrius Vėželis; Ján Krošlák / Branislav Stankovič	6^{2} 7^{7}	4; 6

=== 3rd to 4th play-off ===
==== Malta vs. Tunisia ====
Malta
1
SSI Slovan Tennis Club, Bratislava, Slovakia
22 May 1994

Tunisia
2

			1	2	3
1	(Malta) (Tunisia)	Gordon Asciak; Sami Sidia	1; 6	6^{4} 7^{7}
2	(Malta) (Tunisia)	Mark Schembri; Adel Lahdhiri	1; 6	4; 6
3	(Malta) (Tunisia)	Gordon Asciak / Mark Schembri; Aref Jallali / Amine Nabli	6; 0	6; 1

== 5th to 8th place play-offs ==
=== 5th to 8th play-offs ===
==== Congo vs. Turkey ====
Congo
0
SSI Slovan Tennis Club, Bratislava, Slovakia
21 May 1994

Turkey
3

			1	2	3
1	(Republic of the Congo) (Turkey)	Crépin Ossombi; Barış Ergün	1; 6	1; 6
2	(Republic of the Congo) (Turkey)	Christian Bemba; Berk Albayrak	2; 6	1; 6
3	(Republic of the Congo) (Turkey)	Christian Bemba / Crépin Ossombi; Berk Albayrak / Mustafa Azkara	2; 6	3; 6

==== Cyprus vs. Sudan ====
Cyprus
3
SSI Slovan Tennis Club, Bratislava, Slovakia
21 May 1994

Sudan
0

			1	2	3
1	(Cyprus) (Sudan)	Demetrios Leontis; Asim Omar El-Agraa	6; 0	6; 1
2	(Cyprus) (Sudan)	Alkis Papamichael; Mandour Abdalla	6; 0	6; 0
3	(Cyprus) (Sudan)	Marinos Baghdatis / Loucas Christophides; Asim Omar El-Agraa / Abbas Jeha	6; 2	6; 1

=== 5th to 6th play-off ===
==== Cyprus vs. Turkey ====
Cyprus
1
SSI Slovan Tennis Club, Bratislava, Slovakia
22 May 1994

Turkey
2

			1	2	3
1	(Cyprus) (Turkey)	Alkis Papamichael; Barış Ergün	4; 6	7^{7} 6^{4}	6; 2
2	(Cyprus) (Turkey)	Marinos Baghdatis; Alaaddin Karagöz	4; 6	6; 3	3; 6
3	(Cyprus) (Turkey)	Loucas Christophides / Demetrios Leontis; Berk Albayrak / Alaaddin Karagöz	4; 6	5; 7

=== 7th to 8th play-off ===
==== Congo vs. Sudan ====
Congo
1
SSI Slovan Tennis Club, Bratislava, Slovakia
22 May 1994

Sudan
2

			1	2	3
1	(Republic of the Congo) (Sudan)	Crépin Ossombi; Asim Omar El-Agraa	6; 2	6; 2
2	(Republic of the Congo) (Sudan)	Christian Bemba; Mandour Abdalla	3; 6	3; 6
3	(Republic of the Congo) (Sudan)	Christian Bemba / Crépin Ossombi; Mandour Abdalla / Khalid Farid	6; 4	4; 6	6; 8
