= Branislav Stanković =

Branislav Stanković may refer to:

- Branko Stanković, Branislav "Branko" Stanković, Yugoslavian football (soccer) player
- Branislav Stankovič, Slovak tennis player
