= 1987 Cedok Open =

- Date: 10–16 August
- Edition: 1st
- Category: Grand Prix
- Draw: 32S / 16D
- Prize money: $150,000
- Surface: Clay / outdoor
- Location: Prague, Czechoslovakia
- Venue: I. Czech Lawn Tennis Club

Champions

Singles
- (Czechoslovakia) Marián Vajda

Doubles
- (Czechoslovakia) Miloslav Mečíř / (Czechoslovakia) Tomáš Šmíd
- Prague Open

The 1987 Cedok Open, also known as the Prague Open, was a men's tennis tournament played on outdoor clay courts at the I. Czech Lawn Tennis Club in Prague, Czechoslovakia that was part of the 1987 Grand Prix circuit. It was the inaugural edition of the tournament and was held from 10 August until 16 August 1987. Fourth-seeded Marián Vajda won the singles title.

== Finals ==
=== Singles ===
(Czechoslovakia) Marián Vajda defeated (Czechoslovakia) Tomáš Šmíd 3–6, 6–3, 6–3

- It was Vajda's first singles title of his career.

=== Doubles ===
(Czechoslovakia) Miloslav Mečíř / (Czechoslovakia) Tomáš Šmíd defeated (Czechoslovakia) Stanislav Birner / (Czechoslovakia) Jaroslav Navrátil 6–3, 6–7, 6–3
