= Óscar Martínez (tennis) =

Spanish tennis player & coach (born 1974)

- Country (sports): Spain
- Born: 9 March 1974 (age 52) Valencia, Spain
- Height: 1.85 m (6 ft 1 in)
- Turned pro: 1992
- Plays: Right-handed (one-handed backhand)
- Prize money: $240,000

Singles
- Career record: 19-27
- Career titles: 0
- Highest ranking: No. 68 (10 Apr 1995)

Grand Slam singles results
- French Open: 1R (1995)
- Wimbledon: 1R (1995)

Óscar Martínez Diéguez (born 9 March 1974) is a tennis coach and a former professional player from Spain.

== Career ==
Martinez made his debut on the ATP Tour at the 1994 Casablanca Open, where he defeated two top 100 players, Carl-Uwe Steeb and Franco Davín, en route to a quarter-final appearance. He was runner-up in the 1994 Athens International, beating the second and third seeds, before losing the final to Alberto Berasategui. The Spaniard also reached the quarterfinals in Prague that year.

In 1995, Martinez was a quarterfinalist in Mexico City. He had a win that year over world number 13 Alberto Berasategui in Stuttgart's Mercedes Cup and appeared in two Grand Slam tournaments. In the 1995 French Open he was beaten in the first round by Daniel Vacek and in Wimbledon he lost again in the opening round, to Stefan Edberg.

== ATP career finals ==
=== Singles: 1 (0–1) ===
Result	W-L	Date	Tournament	Surface	Opponent	Score
Loss	0–1	Oct 1994	Athens, Greece	Clay	(Spain) Alberto Berasategui	6–4, 6–7^{(4–7)}, 3–6

== Challenger titles ==
=== Singles: (3) ===
No.	Year	Tournament	Surface	Opponent	Score
1.	1994	Neu-Ulm, Germany	Clay	(Czech Republic) Václav Roubíček	6–1, 6–1
2.	1995	Agadir, Morocco	Clay	(Czech Republic) Bohdan Ulihrach	3–6, 6–3, 6–3
3.	1996	Salinas, Ecuador	Hard	(Ecuador) Luis Adrian Morejon	6–2, 6–7, 6–3
