= Czechoslovakian International Championships =

Defunct tennis tournament
- Tour: ILTF World Circuit (1920-1968)
- Founded: 1920; 106 years ago
- Abolished: 1985; 41 years ago
- Location: Prague (1920–1964, 1966, 1968); Bratislava (1965, 1967, 1969–1973, 1975, 1977, 1979, 1981, 1983, 1985); Ostrava (1974, 1976, 1978, 1980, 1982); Přerov (1984)
- Venue: Various

Current champions
- Men's singles: (Czechoslovakia) Miloslav Mečíř

The Czechoslovakian International Championships was a tennis tournament held between 1920 and 1985.

== History ==
The tournament began soon after Czechoslovakia began as a country (there were tournaments before that such as the Bohemian Crown Lands Championships). The tournament had many winners from overseas, including winners of Grand Slam singles titles Henri Cochet, Fred Perry, Don Budge, József Asbóth, Nicola Pietrangeli, and Tony Roche. Also, Czechoslovak players that won Grand Slam singles titles Jaroslav Drobný, Jan Kodeš and Ivan Lendl also won the title.

The tournament was held on clay courts and was typically held in June or July, but sometimes as early as April or as late as September.

From 1939 to May 1945 Czechoslovakia ceased to exist. Bohemia and Moravia became a Protectorate overseen by Nazi Germany. The Czechoslovakian International Championships resumed in July 1945.

When the Grand Prix circuit began in the 1970s, the tournament was not part of it. The tournament was held exclusively in Prague until the mid-1960s and then was held in other cities such as Bratislava and Ostrava (and one year in Přerov). A Czech Grand Prix tournament, the Prague Grand Prix, was held from 1987 to 1989. When the ATP Tour began, they had the Czechoslovak Open, which became the Czech Open, which was held throughout the 1990s.

== Past finals ==
=== Men's singles ===
Year	Champion	Runner-up	Score
1920	(Czechoslovakia) S. Zemla	(Czechoslovakia)	
1921	(Czechoslovakia) S. Zemla	(Czechoslovakia)	
1922	(Czechoslovakia) Karel Ardelt	(Czechoslovakia)	
1923	(Czechoslovakia) S. Zemla	(Czechoslovakia)	
1924	(Switzerland) Charles Aeschlimann	(Czechoslovakia) Pavel Macenauer	6–3, 6–4, 4–6, 0–6, 7–5
1925	(Czechoslovakia) Jan Koželuh	(Czechoslovakia) František Soyka	6–1, 6–1, 6–2
1926	(Czechoslovakia) Jan Koželuh	(Czechoslovakia) Friedrich Rohrer	6–1, 6–2, 6–3
1927	(Czechoslovakia) Jan Koželuh	(Czechoslovakia) Roderich Menzel	6–1, 4–1 rtd.
1928	(Czechoslovakia) Jan Koželuh	(Czechoslovakia) Franz Matejka	7–5, 4–6, 6–1, 3–6, 6–4
1929	(France) Henri Cochet	(France) Christian Boussus	2–6, 6–8, 6–2, 7–5, 8–6
1930	(Czechoslovakia) Josef Maleček	(Socialist Federal Republic of Yugoslavia) Franjo Šefer	4–6, 6–4, 6–0, 6–1
1931	(Japan) Hyotaro Sato	(Japan) Minoru Kawachi	5–7, 6–3, 6–1, 6–1
1932	(Italy) Uberto De Morpurgo	(Czechoslovakia) Pavel Macenauer	6–4, 6–4, 4–6, 6–3
1933	(Czechoslovakia) Roderich Menzel	(Czechoslovakia) Ladislav Hecht	6–3, 6–2, 6–1
1934	(Czechoslovakia) Roderich Menzel	(Nazi Germany) Gottfried von Cramm	3–6, 6–1, 6–3, 6–2
1935	(Czechoslovakia) Roderich Menzel	(Italy) Giovanni Palmieri	6–2, 6–1, 6–1
1936	(United Kingdom) Fred Perry	(Czechoslovakia) Ladislav Hecht	6–2, 6–3, 4–6, 6–1
1937	(Czechoslovakia) Roderich Menzel	(Italy) Giovanni Palmieri	6–1, 6–0, 6–3
1938	(United States) Don Budge	(Czechoslovakia) Ladislav Hecht	6–1, 6–4, 6–4
1939-44 (Note: Bohemia-Moravia became a Protectorate of Nazi Germany at the end of the 1930s, so the tournaments of 1939-44 were the Protectorate Championships. From 1941 to 1944 these were national events.)	No competition		
1945	(Czechoslovakia) Jaroslav Drobný	(Czechoslovakia) Vojtěch Vodička	6–1, 6–1, 6–2
1946	(Czechoslovakia) Jaroslav Drobný	(France) Marcel Bernard	8–6, 11–9, 6–3
1947	(Czechoslovakia) Jaroslav Drobný	(United States) Tom Brown	6–2, 6–2, 6–1
1948	(Czechoslovakia) Jaroslav Drobný	(Hungary) András Ádám-Stolpa	6–4, 6–1, 6–3
1949	(Czechoslovakia) Jaroslav Drobný	(Poland) Władysław Skonecki	
1950	(Hungary) József Asbóth	(Poland) Władysław Skonecki	9–7, 6–3, 4–6, 2–6, 9–7
1951-54	No competition		
1955	(Czechoslovakia) Jiří Javorský	(Hungary) András Ádám-Stolpa	6–2, 6–3, 5–7, 6–2
1956	(Australia) Don Candy	(France) Pierre Darmon	6–3, 6–1, 6–1
1957	(Czechoslovakia) Jiří Javorský	(Czechoslovakia) Richard Schonborn	6–2, 6–1, 5–7, 6–3
1958	(Italy) Nicola Pietrangeli	(Mexico) Mario Llamas	1–6, 1–6, 6–4, 6–2, 6–0
1959	(Czechoslovakia) Jiří Javorský	(Australia) Don Candy	6–4, 4–6, 6–0, 3–6, 6–4
1960	(Czechoslovakia) Jiří Javorský	(West Germany) Peter Scholl	6–4, 3–6, 6–2, 6–1
1961	(Hungary) István Gulyás	(Czechoslovakia) Karol Safarik	2–6, 6–4, 6–4, 6–2
1962	(Poland) Władysław Skonecki	(Czechoslovakia) Jiří Javorský	6–2, 3–6, 6–4, 4–6, 6–1
1963	(Australia) Ken Fletcher	(Australia) John Fraser	6–3, 6–2, 7–5
1964	(Czechoslovakia) Jiří Javorský	(Czechoslovakia) Štěpán Koudelka	7–5, 6–2, 6–2
1965	(France) Patricio Rodriguez	(Hungary) István Gulyás	6–3, 6–3, 6–4
1966	(Australia) Tony Roche	(Australia) Bill Bowrey	7–9, 6–3, 6–1, 6–3
1967	(Czechoslovakia) Jan Kodeš	(Romania) Ion Tiriac	1–6, 13–11, 6–1, 6–2
1968	(Czechoslovakia) Milan Holeček	(Czechoslovakia) František Pála	6–3, 6–1, 5–7, 7–5
1969	(Hungary) István Gulyás	(West Germany) Christian Kuhnke	6–1, 6–3, 3–6, 6–4
1970	(Czechoslovakia) Jan Kodeš	(Czechoslovakia) Milan Holeček	3–6, 6–3, 6–2, 7–5
1971	(Czechoslovakia) Jan Kodeš	(Hungary) Szabolcz Baranyi	4–6, 6–3, 5–7, 6–4, 6–3
1972	No competition		
1973	(Czechoslovakia) František Pála	(Hungary) János Benyik	8–6, 5–7, 4–6, 6–3, 6–1
1974	(Czechoslovakia) Vladimír Zedník	(Czechoslovakia) Jan Kodeš	3–6, 7–5, 6–4 rtd.
1975	(Czechoslovakia) František Pála	(Czechoslovakia) Jiri Hrebec	2–6, 6–3, 7–5, 6–0
1976	(Czechoslovakia) Tomáš Šmíd	(Czechoslovakia) Pavel Huťka	6–4, 4–6, 6–4
1977	(Czechoslovakia) Jiří Hřebec	(Czechoslovakia) František Pála	1–6, 6–7, 6–4, 6–4, 6–1
1978	(Czechoslovakia) Ivan Lendl	(Czechoslovakia) Vladimír Zedník	6–4, 1–6, 6–1, 6–3
1979	(Czechoslovakia) Ivan Lendl	(Czechoslovakia) Pavel Složil	6–2, 7–6, 6–3
1980	(Czechoslovakia) Ivan Lendl	(Czechoslovakia) Stanislav Birner	6–3, 6–2, 7–6
1981	(Czechoslovakia) Tomáš Šmíd	(Czechoslovakia) Pavel Složil	6–2, 6–3, 3–6, 7–5
1982	(Czechoslovakia) Pavel Složil	(Czechoslovakia) Tomáš Šmíd	4–6, 6–3, 6–2, 3–6, 6–3
1983	(Czechoslovakia) Miloslav Mečíř	(Czechoslovakia) Libor Pimek	6–1, 4–6, 1–6, 7–6, 7–5
1984	(Czechoslovakia) Miloslav Mečíř	(Czechoslovakia) Tomáš Šmíd	1–6, 5–7, 7–5, 6–3, 6–4
1985	(Czechoslovakia) Miloslav Mečíř	(Czechoslovakia) Libor Pimek	7–6, 6–4, 6–3

=== Women's singles ===
Year	Champion
1920	(Czechoslovakia) M. Lindová
1921	(Czechoslovakia) E. Völker
1922	(Germany) Nelly Neppach
1923	No competition
1924	(Czechoslovakia) H. Šindelárová
1925	(Czechoslovakia) H. Šindelárová
1926	(Czechoslovakia) A. Varady
1927	(Czechoslovakia) K. Rezničková
1928	(Czechoslovakia) Greta Deutschová
1929	(Czechoslovakia) M. Kozeluhova
1930	(Czechoslovakia) Greta Deutschová
1931	(Germany) Hilde Krahwinkel
1932	(Czechoslovakia) V. Hammerová
1933	(Czechoslovakia) Greta Deutschová
1934	(United States) Elizabeth Ryan
1935	(South Africa) Bobbie Heine Miller
1936	(Nazi Germany) Margrethe Käppel
1937	(Nazi Germany) Margrethe Käppel
1938	(South Africa) Bobbie Heine Miller
1939-44	No competition
1945	(Czechoslovakia) Helena Straubeová
1946	(Romania) Magda Rurac
1947	(Hungary) Zsuzsa Körmöczy
1948	(Czechoslovakia) M. Erdödy
1949	(Poland) Jadwiga Jędrzejowska
1950	(Hungary) Zsuzsa Körmöczy
1951-54	No competition
1955	(Hungary) Zsuzsa Körmöczy
1956	(Germany) Erika Vollmer
1957	(Czechoslovakia) Vera Puzejová
1958	(Czechoslovakia) Vera Puzejová
1959	(Czechoslovakia) Vera Puzejová
1960	(Czechoslovakia) Vera Puzejová
1961	(Australia) Jan Lehane
1962	(Soviet Union) Anna Dmitrieva
1963	(Czechoslovakia) Vera Puzejová Suková
1964	(Czechoslovakia) Vera Puzejová Suková
1965	(Czechoslovakia) Vlasta Vopičková
1966	(Australia) Kerry Melville
1967	(Czechoslovakia) Vlasta Vopičková
1968	(Australia) Helen Gourlay
1969	(Czechoslovakia) Vlasta Vopičková
1970	(Czechoslovakia) Vlasta Vopičková
1971	(Czechoslovakia) Marie Neumannová
1972	No competition
1973	(Australia) Evonne Goolagong
1974	(Czechoslovakia) Renáta Tomanová
1975	(Czechoslovakia) Regina Maršiková
1976	(Czechoslovakia) Renáta Tomanová
1977	(Czechoslovakia) Regina Maršiková
1978	(Czechoslovakia) Regina Maršiková
1979	(Czechoslovakia)
1980	(Czechoslovakia)
1981	(Czechoslovakia)
1982	(Czechoslovakia)
1983	(Czechoslovakia)
1984	(Czechoslovakia)
1985	(Czechoslovakia)

== See also ==
- Category:National and multi-national tennis tournaments
