= 1996 Skoda Czech Open – Singles =

Singles
- 1996 Skoda Czech Open

Final
- Champion: (Russia) Yevgeny Kafelnikov
- Runner-up: (Czech Republic) Bohdan Ulihrach
- Score: 7–5, 1–6, 6–3

Details
- Draw: 32
- Seeds: 8

Events
Singles	Doubles
← 1995 ·	Prague Open	· 1997 →

The 1996 Skoda Czech Open was a men's tennis tournament played on clay in Prague, Czech Republic that was part of the International Series of the 1996 ATP Tour. Bohdan Ulihrach was the defending champion but lost in the final 7–5, 1–6, 6–3 against Yevgeny Kafelnikov.

== Seeds ==
A champion seed is indicated in bold text while text in italics indicates the round in which that seed was eliminated.

1. (Sweden) Thomas Enqvist (first round)
2. (Russia) **Yevgeny Kafelnikov (champion)**
3. n/a
4. (Switzerland) Marc Rosset (first round)
5. (Czech Republic) Bohdan Ulihrach (final)
6. (Czech Republic) Daniel Vacek (quarterfinals)
7. (Belgium) Filip Dewulf (first round)
8. (Spain) Javier Sánchez (quarterfinals)

== Draw ==
=== Key ===
- Q = Qualifier
- WC = Wild card
- LL = Lucky loser
- Alt = Alternate
- SE = Special exempt
- PR = Protected ranking
- ITF = ITF entry
- JE = Junior exempt
- w/o = Walkover
- r = Retired
- d = Defaulted
- SR = Special ranking

First round
1	(Sweden) T Enqvist	6^{5}	1
(Spain) **F Mantilla**	**7^{7}**	**6**
(Spain) **E Sánchez**	**6**	**6**
(France) J Golmard	1	2
LL	(Spain) **M A Gorriz**	**6**	**6**
(Germany) D Dier	3	4
Q	(Spain) **A Martín**	**7^{7}**	3	**6**
7	(Belgium) F Dewulf	6^{4}	**6**	4
4	(Switzerland) M Rosset	6^{3}	2
(Germany) **P Baur**	**7^{7}**	**6**
WC	(Czech Republic) **M Tabara**	3	**6**	**7**
WC	(Czech Republic) D Miketa	**6**	4	5
(Uzbekistan) O Ogorodov	3	2
Q	(United States) **F Montana**	**6**	**6**
WC	(Czech Republic) P Luxa	0	2
5	(Czech Republic) **B Ulihrach**	**6**	**6**
6	(Czech Republic) **D Vacek**	**6**	2	**6**
LL	(Italy) F Messori	2	**6**	1
(Portugal) J Cunha e Silva	**6**	5	6^{2}
(Hungary) **S Noszály**	2	**7**	**7^{7}**
(Norway) **C Ruud**	**6**	**6**
(Czech Republic) M Damm	2	3
(France) **F Santoro**	**7**	**6**
LL	(Australia) J Sekulov	5	4
8	(Spain) **J Sánchez**	**6**	**6**
(Denmark) F Fetterlein	0	4
Q	(Brazil) **G Kuerten**	3	**7**	**7**
(Russia) A Chesnokov	**6**	5	5
(Czech Republic) D Rikl	**6**	6^{4}	4
(Portugal) **N Marques**	2	**7^{7}**	**6**
Q	(Czech Republic) D Škoch	3	3
2	(Russia) **Y Kafelnikov**	**6**	**6**

Second round
(Spain) F Mantilla	6^{3}	3
(Spain) **E Sánchez**	**7^{7}**	**6**
LL	(Spain) M A Gorriz	2	2
Q	(Spain) **A Martín**	**6**	**6**
(Germany) P Baur	2	1
WC	(Czech Republic) **M Tabara**	**6**	**6**
Q	(United States) F Montana	6^{2}	4
5	(Czech Republic) **B Ulihrach**	**7^{7}**	**6**
6	(Czech Republic) **D Vacek**	**6**	**6**
(Hungary) S Noszály	2	2
(Norway) **C Ruud**	**4**
(France) F Santoro	1	r
8	(Spain) **J Sánchez**	**7^{7}**	3	**7^{8}**
Q	(Brazil) G Kuerten	6^{3}	**6**	6^{6}
(Portugal) N Marques	4	2
2	(Russia) **Y Kafelnikov**	**6**	**6**

Quarterfinals
(Spain) **E Sánchez**	**6**	**6**
Q	(Spain) A Martín	0	3
WC	(Czech Republic) M Tabara	2	0
5	(Czech Republic) **B Ulihrach**	**6**	**6**
6	(Czech Republic) D Vacek	1	3
(Norway) **C Ruud**	**6**	**6**
8	(Spain) J Sánchez	1	1
2	(Russia) **Y Kafelnikov**	**6**	**6**

Semifinals
(Spain) E Sánchez	3	1
5	(Czech Republic) **B Ulihrach**	**6**	**6**
(Norway) C Ruud	5	**7**	3
2	(Russia) **Y Kafelnikov**	**7**	5	**6**

Final
5	(Czech Republic) Bohdan Ulihrach	5	**6**	3
2	(Russia) **Yevgeny Kafelnikov**	**7**	1	**6**
