= Tennis at the 1987 Summer Universiade =

Tennis events were contested at the 1987 Summer Universiade in Zagreb, Yugoslavia.

== Medal summary ==
Event	Gold	Silver	Bronze
Men's Singles	Bruno Orešar (YUG)	Igor Šarić (YUG)	Ģirts Dzelde (URS); Mario Tabares (CUB)
Men's Doubles	Branislav Stanković; Richard Vogel (TCH)	Ģirts Dzelde; Andrei Olhovskiy (URS)	Bae Nam-ju; Kim Jae-sik (KOR); Igor Šarić; Branko Horvat (YUG)
Women's Singles	Leila Meskhi (URS)	Iva Budařová (TCH)	Sabrina Goleš (YUG); Lee Jeong-myung (KOR)
Women's Doubles	Leila Meskhi; Viktoria Milvidskaia (URS)	Nora Bajčíková; Iva Budařová (TCH)	Katrina Adams; Sonia Hahn (USA); Renata Šašak; Biljana Mirković (YUG)
Mixed Doubles	Sabrina Goleš; Bruno Orešar (YUG)	Leila Meskhi; Andrei Olhovskiy (URS)	Katrina Adams; Greg Van Emburgh (USA); Biljana Mirković; Igor Šarić (YUG)

== Medal table ==
Rank	Nation	Gold	Silver	Bronze	Total
1	Soviet Union (URS)	2	2	1	5
2	Yugoslavia (YUG)	2	1	4	7
3	Czechoslovakia (TCH)	1	2	0	3
4	South Korea (KOR)	0	0	2	2
4	United States (USA)	0	0	2	2
6	Cuba (CUB)	0	0	1	1
Totals (6 entries)		5	5	10	20

== See also ==
- Tennis at the Summer Universiade
