= Richard Vogel (tennis) =

Czech tennis player (born 1964)

- Country (sports): Czechoslovakia (1986–1992); Czech Republic (1992–1993)
- Born: 13 August 1964 (age 61) Ostrava, Czechoslovakia
- Height: 1.93 m (6 ft 4 in)
- Plays: Right-handed
- Prize money: $143,874

Singles
- Career record: 3–9
- Career titles: 0
- Highest ranking: No. 158 (11 Dec 1989)

Grand Slam singles results
- French Open: 1R (1989)
- Wimbledon: 1R (1991)

Doubles
- Career record: 27–30
- Career titles: 1
- Highest ranking: No. 92 (22 Jul 1991)

Grand Slam doubles results
- French Open: 1R (1989, 1991)
- Wimbledon: 1R (1989, 1991)
Medal record
Representing Czechoslovakia
Friendship Games
Bronze medal – third place	1984	Men's doubles
Summer Universiade
Gold medal – first place	1987 Zagreb	Men's doubles

Richard Vogel (born 13 August 1964) is a Czech former professional tennis player. He competed for Czechoslovakia and the Czech Republic.

== Career ==
Vogel played in the singles draw of two Grand Slams during his career and lost five set matches in both opening rounds, at the 1989 French Open (to Aaron Krickstein) and the 1991 Wimbledon Championships (to Jacco Eltingh). His loss to Eltingh set a Wimbledon record, as it was the first occasion that four tie breaks had been played in a single match at Wimbledon. As a men's doubles player he was also unable to make it past the first round, in four attempts.

On the ATP Tour he had his best result in 1992, at the Croatia Open, where he was the doubles champion, with David Prinosil. His best singles performance came at Kitzbühel in 1991, with an appearance in the round of 16, after two wins, one of which was over Cédric Pioline.

He partnered Branislav Stankovič at the 1987 Summer Universiade and the pair won the gold medal.

== ATP Career finals ==
=== Doubles: 1 (1–0) ===
Result	W/L	Date	Tournament	Surface	Partner	Opponents	Score
Win	1–0	Aug 1992	Umag, Croatia	Clay	(Germany) David Prinosil	(Netherlands) Sander Groen (Germany) Lars Koslowski	6–3, 6–7, 7–6

== Challenger titles ==
=== Singles: (1) ===
No.	Year	Tournament	Surface	Opponent	Score
1.	1989	Eger, Hungary	Clay	(Belgium) Libor Pimek	2–6, 7–5, 6–1

=== Doubles: (9) ===
No.	Year	Tournament	Surface	Partner	Opponents	Score
1.	1986	Vienna, Austria	Carpet	(Czechoslovakia) Karel Nováček	(Netherlands) Jan-Willem Lodder (South Africa) Denys Maasdorp	6–4, 6–4
2.	1989	Eger, Hungary	Clay	(Czechoslovakia) Branislav Stankovič	(Romania) George Cosac (Romania) Florin Segărceanu	6–4, 3–6, 7–5
3.	1989	Casablanca, Morocco	Clay	(Czechoslovakia) Jaroslav Bulant	(Belgium) Libor Pimek (Romania) Florin Segărceanu	6–1, 6–3
4.	1990	Parioli, Italy	Clay	(Czechoslovakia) Branislav Stankovič	(Italy) Nicola Bruno (Italy) Stefano Pescosolido	7–5, 6–3
5.	1990	Pescara, Italy	Clay	(Czechoslovakia) Branislav Stankovič	(Italy) Massimo Cierro (Italy) Alessandro de Minicis	6–3, 6–1
6.	1991	Prague, Czechoslovakia	Clay	(United States) Steve DeVries	(Czechoslovakia) David Rikl (Czechoslovakia) Martin Damm	2–6, 6–1, 6–4
7.	1992	Graz, Austria	Clay	(Germany) David Prinosil	(Czechoslovakia) Robert Novotny (Czechoslovakia) Milan Trněný	6–3, 6–4
8.	1993	Ljubljana, Slovenia	Clay	(Slovakia) Branislav Stankovič	(Netherlands) Hendrik Jan Davids (Croatia) Goran Prpić	6–4, 7–6
9.	1993	Neu-Ulm, Germany	Clay	(Germany) David Prinosil	(Mexico) Jorge Lozano (Germany) Udo Riglewski	6–1, 6–3
