= Michele Fioroni =

Italian tennis player

Fioroni, Michele
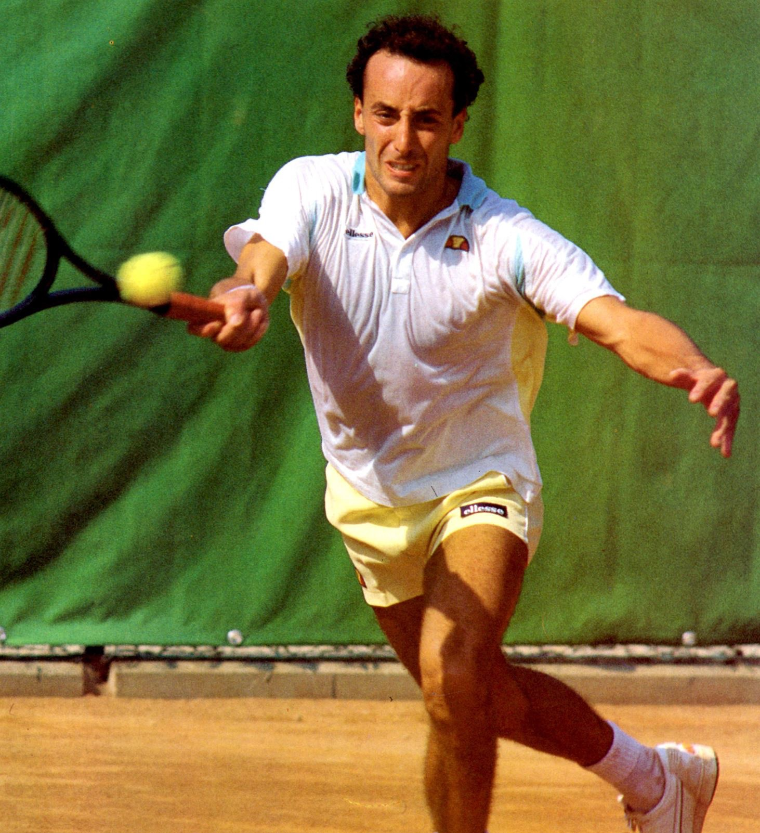
- Country (sports): Italy
- Born: 16 February 1965 (age 60); Perugia, Italy
- Height: 1.80 m (5 ft 11 in)
- Plays: Right-handed
- Prize money: US$41,971

Singles
- Career record: 0–8
- Highest ranking: No. 205 (29 August 1988)

Grand Slam singles results
- Australian Open: Q1 (1991)
- French Open: 1R (1987)
- Wimbledon: Q1 (1986)
- US Open: DNP

Doubles
- Career record: 7–16
- Highest ranking: No. 190 (18 April 1988)

Michele Fioroni (born 16 February 1965) is a male former tennis player from Italy.

Fioroni represented his native country in the singles competition at the 1984 Summer Olympics in Los Angeles. He was eliminated in the first round there by Emilio Sánchez.

Fioroni's lone appearance in the main draw of a Grand Slam event came at the French Open in 1987, where he lost in the first round to Anders Järryd.

Fioroni's highest ranking in singles was world No. 205, which he reached on 29 August 1988. His highest doubles ranking was world No. 190, which he reached on 18 April 1988.
