= Jaroslav Bulant =

Czech tennis player (born 1964)

- Full name: Jaroslav Bulant
- Country (sports): Czechoslovakia; Czech Republic
- Born: 21 April 1964 (age 61); Třebíč, Czechoslovakia
- Plays: Right–handed
- Prize money: $85,900

Singles
- Career record: 2–9
- Career titles: 0
- Highest ranking: No. 142 (3 April 1989)

Doubles
- Career record: 2–6
- Career titles: 0
- Highest ranking: No. 200 (13 February 1989)

Jaroslav Bulant (born 21 April 1964) is a Czech former professional tennis player.

== Biography ==
Bulant was born in Třebíč and based in Jihlava when he turned professional in 1986.

In 1988 he won a Challenger title in Zurich and made his first Grand Prix appearance, at the Prague Open. He reached his career best ranking of 142 in 1989, a year he appeared at five Grand Prix tournaments and won a further Challenger title in Nicosia. In 1994, by then competing on the ATP Tour, Bulant upset the world's 20th ranked player at the Colombia Open, Carlos Costa, who was also the top seed.

Since retiring he has worked as a coach. In 2005 he coached Lucie Šafářová and in 2008 was coach of Dominik Hrbatý. From late 2009 to early 2010 he coached Dominika Cibulková.

== Challenger titles ==
=== Singles: (2) ===
No.	Year	Tournament	Surface	Opponent	Score
1.	1988	Rümikon, Switzerland	Clay	(Switzerland) Roland Stadler	6–3, 6–7, 6–2
2.	1989	Nicosia, Cyprus	Clay	(West Germany) Markus Zillner	6–3, 6–4

=== Doubles: (2) ===
No.	Year	Tournament	Surface	Partner	Opponents	Score
1.	1988	Eger, Hungary	Clay	(Czechoslovakia) Vojtěch Flégl	(Czechoslovakia) Karel Nováček (Czechoslovakia) Richard Vogel	6–4, 6–4
2.	1989	Casablanca, Morocco	Clay	(Czechoslovakia) Richard Vogel	(Belgium) Libor Pimek (Romania) Florin Segărceanu	6–1, 6–3
