= Tomáš Krupa =

Czech tennis player and coach (born 1972)

- Full name: Tomáš Krupa
- Country (sports): Czech Republic
- Born: 14 November 1972 (age 53)
- Prize money: $59,685

Singles
- Highest ranking: No. 278 (October 23, 1995)

Doubles
- Career record: 9–11
- Career titles: 0
- Highest ranking: No. 124 (March 4, 1996)

Tomáš Krupa (born 14 November 1972) is a former professional tennis player and now coach from the Czech Republic.

== Biography ==
Krupa was a doubles specialist, most successful during his partnership with countryman Pavel Vízner. The pair made the semi-finals of the 1993 Romanian Open and were finalists at the Prague Open in 1994. They were unable to compete in the Prague final, giving opponents Karel Nováček and Mats Wilander the title in a walkover. In 1999 he made another ATP Tour semi-final, at the International Raiffeisen Grand Prix tournament in Sankt Pölten, with Petr Pála, in a run which included a win over second seeds David Adams and John-Laffnie de Jager. He won a total of four titles on the Challenger circuit.

As a coach he is most famous for his involvement with Tomáš Berdych, who he coached from 2009 to 2014, during which time he made the final of Wimbledon. Prior to this he worked with Radek Štěpánek. More recently, he has been the coach of Jiří Veselý, Barbora Strýcová and Linda Nosková.

== ATP Tour career finals ==
=== Doubles: 1 (0–1) ===
Result	Date	Tournament	Tier	Surface	Partner	Opponent	Score
Loss	Aug 1994	Prague, Czech Republic	International Series	Clay	(Czech Republic) Pavel Vízner	(Czech Republic) Karel Nováček (Sweden) Mats Wilander	(W/O)

== Challenger titles ==
=== Doubles: (4) ===
No.	Year	Tournament	Surface	Partner	Opponents	Score
1.	1995	Oberstaufen, Germany	Clay	(Czech Republic) Jiří Novák	(Switzerland) Lorenzo Manta (Switzerland) Patrick Mohr	4–6, 6–4, 6–3
2.	1995	Guayaquil, Ecuador	Clay	(Czech Republic) Pavel Vízner	(Ecuador) Pablo Campana (Ecuador) Nicolás Lapentti	6–1, 6–1
3.	1996	Hamburg, Germany	Carpet	(Czech Republic) Pavel Vízner	(Germany) Patrik Kühnen (Germany) Karsten Braasch	6–3, 7–5
4.	1998	Nettingsdorf, Austria	Clay	(Slovenia) Borut Urh	(Czech Republic) Tomáš Cibulec (Czech Republic) Leoš Friedl	6–1, 6–4
