= Martin Střelba =

Czech tennis player (born 1967)

- Country (sports): Czechoslovakia; Czech Republic
- Residence: Stará Boleslav
- Born: 22 March 1967 (age 58); Stará Boleslav
- Height: 1.91 m (6 ft 3 in)
- Plays: Right-handed
- Prize money: $400,835

Singles
- Career record: 42–67
- Career titles: 0
- Highest ranking: No. 53 (26 February 1990)

Grand Slam singles results
- Australian Open: 1R (1992)
- French Open: 2R (1990)
- Wimbledon: 1R (1989, 1990, 1993)
- US Open: 1R (1990, 1992)

Martin Střelba (born 22 March 1967) is a former professional tennis player from the Czech Republic.

== Career ==
Střelba was the Czechoslovak junior champion in 1985. He reached the semi-finals of a Grand Prix event for the first time in 1988, in Prague. The following year he went one better and finished runner-up in Munich's BMW Open. His run to the final included wins over three top 20 players, Emilio Sánchez, Jonas Svensson and reigning Wimbledon champion Stefan Edberg, the latter in straight sets. In 1989 he also reached the quarter-finals of the Athens Open, Prague Open and in Kitzbühel.

His only win in a Grand Slam match came in the 1990 French Open, where he defeated American Kelly Jones in four sets.

Střelba never reached another final on the ATP World Tour but made quarter-finals at Munich in 1990, Kitzbühel in 1992 and Casablanca in 1993.

He also played some doubles during his career and in 1992 attained his best ever ranking of 208 in the world.

== Grand Prix career finals ==
=== Singles: 1 (0–1) ===
Result	No.	Date	Tournament	Surface	Opponent	Score
Loss	1.	1989	Munich, West Germany	Clay	(Soviet Union) Andrei Chesnokov	7–5, 6–7^{(6–8)}, 2–6

== Challenger titles ==
=== Singles: (1) ===
Result	No.	Year	Tournament	Surface	Opponent	Score
Win	1.	1992	Fürth, Germany	Clay	(Ecuador) Raúl Viver	6–1, 6–2

=== Doubles: (1) ===
Result	No.	Year	Tournament	Surface	Partner	Opponents	Score
Win	1.	1991	Geneva, Switzerland	Clay	(Georgia (country)) Vladimir Gabrichidze	(Argentina) Roberto Argüello (Argentina) Christian Miniussi	1–6, 6–3, 6–4
