= Horst Skoff =

Austrian tennis player

- Country (sports): Austria
- Born: 22 August 1968 Klagenfurt, Austria
- Died: 7 June 2008 (aged 39) Hamburg, Germany
- Height: 1.75 m (5 ft 9 in)
- Turned pro: 1985
- Retired: 1999
- Plays: Right-handed (one-handed backhand)
- Coach: Günter Bresnik; Dumitru Hărădău
- Prize money: $1,651,858

Singles
- Career record: 228–203
- Career titles: 4
- Highest ranking: No. 18 (1 January 1990)

Grand Slam singles results
- Australian Open: 1R (1988, 1991, 1992, 1993, 1995)
- French Open: 2R (1987, 1989, 1991)
- Wimbledon: 2R (1991)
- US Open: 2R (1991)

Other tournaments
- Olympic Games: 1R (1988, 1992)

Doubles
- Career record: 48–57
- Career titles: 2
- Highest ranking: No. 70 (18 September 1989)

Grand Slam doubles results
- French Open: 1R (1989)
- US Open: 1R (1988, 1989)

Other doubles tournaments
- Olympic Games: 2R (1988)

Team competitions
- Davis Cup: SF (1990)

Horst Skoff (22 August 1968 – 7 June 2008) was a professional tennis player from Austria, who won four tournaments at the top-level.

== Biography ==
Skoff was born in Klagenfurt, Austria, and started playing tennis at age 6. In 1984 he won the singles title at the 16-and-under category of the Orange Bowl. He turned professional in 1985. Skoff won his first top-level singles title in 1988 at Athens. Over the course of his career he won four top-level singles titles and two tour doubles titles. His career-high rankings were world No. 18 in singles and world No. 70 in doubles. His career prize money totalled US$1,651,858.

Skoff played on Austria's Davis Cup team for nine years, compiling a 22–17 win–loss record. He helped the team reach the World Group semi-finals in 1990. Memorable Davis Cup rubbers which Skoff was involved in include a five-set win over world No. 2 Mats Wilander in the 1989 quarterfinal that lasted more than six hours; and a five-set loss to Michael Chang in the 1990 semifinal.

Despite Skoff's relative success during his career of winning four top-level tournaments, his memorable Davis Cup moments, and reaching a career high world ranking of 18 in singles competition, he never managed to progress beyond the second round at any Grand Slam event.

Skoff played in his last top-level tournament in August 1995, at the San Marino Open. From 1996–1999, due to his lower world ranking, Skoff played in challenger and futures tournaments. He retired in August 1999, after playing his last match in Sylt, Germany.

Skoff died on 7 June 2008 in Hamburg, Germany, following a heart attack at age 39.

== Career finals ==
=== Singles: 11 (4 wins, 7 losses) ===
| Result | W–L | Date | Tournament | Surface | Opponent | Score |
|---|---|---|---|---|---|---|
| Win | 1–0 | Jun 1988 | Athens, Greece | Clay | (Socialist Federal Republic of Yugoslavia) Bruno Orešar | 6–3, 2–6, 6–2 |
| Win | 2–0 | Oct 1988 | Vienna, Austria | Carpet (i) | (Austria) Thomas Muster | 4–6, 6–3, 6–4, 6–2 |
| Loss | 2–1 | May 1989 | Hamburg, West Germany | Clay | (Czechoslovakia) Ivan Lendl | 4–6, 1–6, 3–6 |
| Loss | 2–2 | Aug 1989 | Prague, Czechoslovakia | Clay | (Uruguay) Marcelo Filippini | 5–7, 6–7 |
| Loss | 2–3 | Sep 1989 | Barcelona, Spain | Clay | (Ecuador) Andrés Gómez | 4–6, 4–6, 2–6 |
| Win | 3–3 | Sep 1990 | Geneva, Switzerland | Clay | (Spain) Sergi Bruguera | 7–6^{(10–8)}, 7–6^{(7–4)} |
| Loss | 3–4 | Oct 1990 | Vienna, Austria | Carpet (i) | (Sweden) Anders Järryd | 3–6, 3–6, 1–6 |
| Loss | 3–5 | Jun 1991 | Florence, Italy | Clay | (Austria) Thomas Muster | 2–6, 7–6^{(7–2)}, 4–6 |
| Loss | 3–6 | Sep 1991 | Geneva, Switzerland | Clay | (Austria) Thomas Muster | 2–6, 4–6 |
| Win | 4–6 | Jul 1993 | Båstad, Sweden | Clay | (Haiti) Ronald Agénor | 7–5, 1–6, 6–0 |
| Loss | 4–7 | Jul 1994 | Båstad, Sweden | Clay | (Germany) Bernd Karbacher | 4–6, 3–6 |

=== Doubles: 6 (2 wins, 4 losses) ===
| Result | W–L | Date | Tournament | Surface | Partner | Opponents | Score |
|---|---|---|---|---|---|---|---|
| Win | 1–0 | Nov 1986 | Buenos Aires, Argentina | Clay | (France) Loïc Courteau | (Argentina) Gustavo Luza (Argentina) Gustavo Tiberti | 3–6, 6–4, 6–3 |
| Loss | 1–1 | May 1988 | Florence, Italy | Clay | (Italy) Claudio Pistolesi | (Argentina) Javier Frana (Argentina) Christian Miniussi | 6–7, 4–6 |
| Loss | 1–2 | Aug 1988 | Prague, Czechoslovakia | Clay | (Austria) Thomas Muster | (Czechoslovakia) Petr Korda (Czechoslovakia) Jaroslav Navrátil | 5–7, 6–7 |
| Win | 2–2 | Aug 1989 | Prague, Czechoslovakia | Clay | (Spain) Jordi Arrese | (Czechoslovakia) Petr Korda (Czechoslovakia) Tomáš Šmíd | 6–4, 6–4 |
| Loss | 2–3 | Apr 1990 | Nice, France | Clay | (Uruguay) Marcelo Filippini | (Argentina) Alberto Mancini (France) Yannick Noah | 4–6, 6–7 |
| Loss | 2–4 | Jul 1990 | Kitzbühel, Austria | Clay | (Spain) Francisco Clavet | (Spain) Javier Sánchez (France) Eric Winogradsky | 4–6, 6–4, 4–6 |

== Singles performance timeline ==
Key
| W | F | SF | QF | #R | RR | Q# | P# | DNQ | A | Z# | PO | G | S | B | NMS | NTI | P | NH |

(W) winner; (F) finalist; (SF) semifinalist; (QF) quarterfinalist; (#R) rounds 4, 3, 2, 1; (RR) round-robin stage; (Q#) qualification round; (P#) preliminary round; (DNQ) did not qualify; (A) absent; (Z#) Davis/Fed Cup Zonal Group (with number indication) or (PO) play-off; (G) gold, (S) silver or (B) bronze Olympic/Paralympic medal; (NMS) not a Masters tournament; (NTI) not a Tier I tournament; (P) postponed; (NH) not held; (SR) strike rate (events won / competed); (W–L) win–loss record.

| Tournament | 1985 | 1986 | 1987 | 1988 | 1989 | 1990 | 1991 | 1992 | 1993 | 1994 | 1995 | 1996 | 1997 | 1998 | 1999 | SR | W–L |
|---|---|---|---|---|---|---|---|---|---|---|---|---|---|---|---|---|---|
Grand Slam tournaments
| Australian Open | A | NH | A | 1R | A | A | 1R | 1R | 1R | A | 1R | Q1 | A | A | A | 0 / 5 | 0–5 |
| French Open | A | A | 2R | 1R | 2R | A | 2R | 1R | 1R | Q1 | A | A | Q3 | A | A | 0 / 6 | 3–6 |
| Wimbledon | A | A | 1R | 1R | 1R | A | 2R | A | 1R | A | A | A | A | A | A | 0 / 5 | 1–5 |
| US Open | A | 1R | A | 1R | 1R | A | 2R | 1R | A | A | A | A | A | A | A | 0 / 5 | 1–5 |
| Win–loss | 0–0 | 0–1 | 1–2 | 0–4 | 1–3 | 0–0 | 3–4 | 0–3 | 0–3 | 0–0 | 0–1 | 0–0 | 0–0 | 0–0 | 0–0 | 0 / 21 | 5–21 |
Grand Prix Championship Series / Super 9 tournaments
| Indian Wells | Not GPCS | | 1R | 1R | 2R | 3R | A | 1R | A | 1R | 2R | A | A | A | A | 0 / 7 | 4–7 |
| Key Biscayne | A | A | A | 1R | 3R | 3R | 3R | 2R | A | A | 1R | A | A | A | A | 0 / 6 | 4–6 |
| Monte Carlo | A | A | SF | 3R | SF | QF | SF | 1R | A | 3R | 1R | A | A | A | A | 0 / 8 | 18–8 |
| Hamburg | A | A | 2R | 3R | F | 1R | 2R | 3R | A | A | 1R | Q1 | A | A | A | 0 / 7 | 11–7 |
| Rome | A | A | 2R | 1R | 1R | A | 2R | 2R | A | A | A | Q2 | A | A | A | 0 / 5 | 3–5 |
| Stockholm | A | A | A | A | 3R | A | 1R | A | A | 1R | Not Super 9 | | | | | 0 / 3 | 1–3 |
| Paris | Not Grand Prix Champ. | | | | 2R | 1R | 2R | A | A | A | A | A | A | A | A | 0 / 3 | 2–3 |
| Win–loss | 0–0 | 0–0 | 6–4 | 4–5 | 13–7 | 6–5 | 8–6 | 3–5 | 0–0 | 2–3 | 1–4 | 0–0 | 0–0 | 0–0 | 0–0 | 0 / 39 | 43–39 |
National representation
| Olympic Games | Not Held | | | 1R | Not Held | | | 1R | Not Held | | | A | Not Held | | | 0 / 2 | 0–2 |
| Davis Cup | A | Z1 | Z1 | Z1 | QF | SF | 1R | Z1 | 1R | 1R | A | A | A | A | A | 0 / 5 | 21–13 |
Career statistics
| Titles | 0 | 0 | 0 | 2 | 0 | 1 | 0 | 0 | 1 | 0 | 0 | 0 | 0 | 0 | 0 | 4 | |
| Finals | 0 | 0 | 0 | 2 | 3 | 2 | 2 | 0 | 1 | 1 | 0 | 0 | 0 | 0 | 0 | 11 | |
| Overall win–loss | 1–2 | 16–8 | 23–23 | 28–19 | 38–23 | 34–25 | 34–30 | 22–25 | 19–19 | 11–16 | 2–13 | 0–0 | 0–0 | 0–0 | 0–0 | 228–203 | |
| Year-end ranking | 299 | 42 | 63 | 45 | 25 | 26 | 33 | 92 | 74 | 47 | 392 | 339 | 199 | 722 | 429 | 53% | |

== Top 10 wins ==
| No. | Player | Rank | Tournament | Surface | Rd | Score | Skoff Rank |
|---|---|---|---|---|---|---|---|
1987
| 1. | (France) Yannick Noah | 4 | Monte Carlo, Monaco | Clay | 2R | 3–6, 7–5, 6–2 | 48 |
1989
| 2. | (Sweden) Mats Wilander | 2 | Davis Cup, Vienna, Austria | Clay (i) | QF | 6–7, 7–6, 1–6, 6–4, 9–7 | 35 |
| 3. | (Germany) Boris Becker | 2 | Hamburg, West Germany | Clay | SF | 7–6, 6–2 | 31 |
1990
| 4. | (Ecuador) Andrés Gómez | 5 | Stuttgart, West Germany | Clay | 3R | 7–5, 0–6, 6–4 | 31 |
| 5. | (Austria) Thomas Muster | 8 | Kitzbühel, Austria | Clay | QF | 6–4, 6–2 | 27 |
| 6. | (Austria) Thomas Muster | 7 | Vienna, Austria | Carpet (i) | SF | 6–2, 7–6 | 29 |
1991
| 7. | (United States) Andre Agassi | 4 | Monte Carlo, Monaco | Clay | 2R | 6–0, 6–7, 6–3 | 32 |
| 8. | (Sweden) Jonas Svensson | 10 | Monte Carlo, Monaco | Clay | QF | 6–3, 6–3 | 32 |
