= George Bezecny =

American tennis player

- Country (sports): United States
- Born: March 24, 1963 (age 63) Fort Lauderdale, Florida
- Height: 6 ft 0 in (183 cm)
- Plays: Right-handed
- Prize money: $27,214

Singles
- Career record: 2–7
- Highest ranking: No. 308 (April 22, 1991)

Grand Slam singles results
- Wimbledon: Q1 (1986, 1988, 1991)
- US Open: Q2 (1993)

Doubles
- Career record: 0–3
- Highest ranking: No. 452 (November 21, 1988)

George Bezecny (born March 24, 1963) is an American former professional tennis player.

== Biography ==
Bezecny was raised in Fort Lauderdale, Florida by parents George Sr and Dagmar, who were both natives of Czechoslovakia. His mother fled the communist country as a 17-year old by skiing down a mountain infested with mines until she reached the American zone, while his father came to the United States to pursue a medical career.

An All-American tennis player at the University of Georgia, Bezecny was a member of the team's 1985 NCAA Division I championship winning team (playing No. 2 singles) and also reached the final of the singles championship that year, which he lost to teammate Mikael Pernfors, Georgia's No. 1 singles player.

Bezecny is recorded as having a career high singles ranking of 308 in the world. His best performances on the ATP Tour (then Grand Prix circuit) were second round appearances at Indianapolis in 1985 and Prague in 1987. He managed to take a set off world number seven Miloslav Mečíř at the 1988 Lipton Championships. On three occasions he featured in the qualifying draw at Wimbledon and he had a win over Sandon Stolle in the qualifiers for the 1993 US Open.

During his career he had to overcome a serious kidney disorder.

Bezecny is a friend of Jack Nicklaus and has been known to compete with the former champion golfer as his doubles partner in tennis tournaments.
