= Bohdan Ulihrach =

Czech tennis player (born 1975)

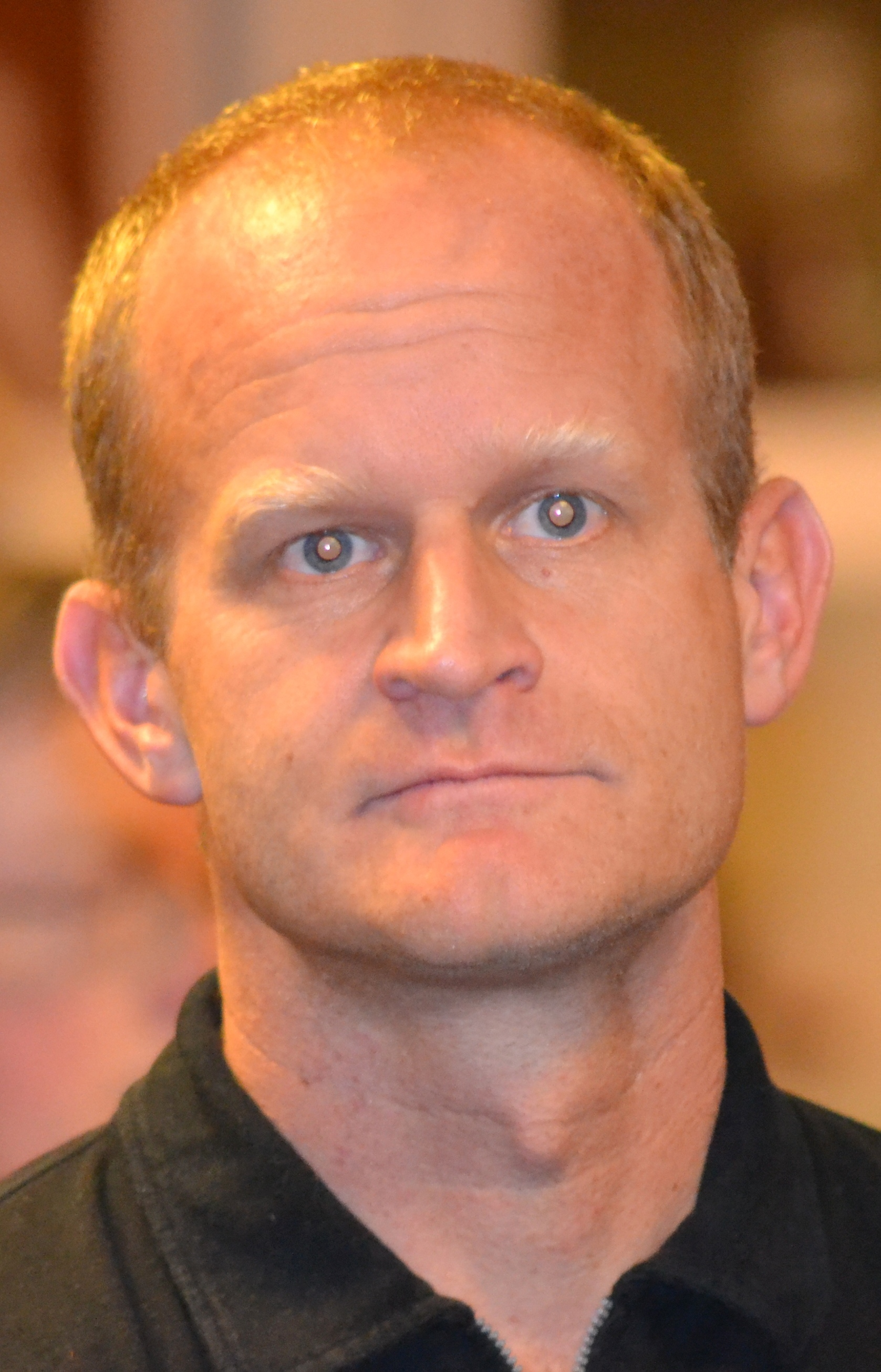
- Country (sports): Czech Republic
- Residence: Monte Carlo, Monaco
- Born: 23 February 1975 (age 50); Kolín, Czechoslovakia
- Height: 1.88 m (6 ft 2 in)
- Turned pro: 1993
- Retired: 2009
- Plays: Right-handed (two-handed backhand)
- Prize money: $3,553,302

Singles
- Career record: 230–246
- Career titles: 3
- Highest ranking: No. 22 (5 May 1997)

Grand Slam singles results
- Australian Open: 4R (1999)
- French Open: 4R (1999)
- Wimbledon: 3R (1996)
- US Open: 2R (1995, 1996, 1997, 1998, 2003)

Doubles
- Career record: 9–25
- Career titles: 0
- Highest ranking: No. 286 (26 July 2004)

Grand Slam doubles results
- Australian Open: 1R (2004, 2005)
- US Open: 2R (2003)
- Last updated on: 20 November 2021.

Bohdan Ulihrach (born 23 February 1975) is a former professional tennis player from the Czech Republic.

== Career ==
Ulihrach turned professional in 1993. He won his first top-level singles title in July 1995 at Prague, where he defeated Javier Sánchez in the final. His second followed three months later at Montevideo, where he beat Alberto Berasategui in the final.

In 1996, Ulihrach was part of the Czech Republic team which finished runner-up at the World Team Cup. In 1997, en route to his first hardcourt final at the Indian Wells Masters, Ulihrach beat the then-world No. 1, Pete Sampras. In the final, he was defeated by Michael Chang. Ulihrach reached a career-high singles ranking of world No. 22 in May 1997.

He reached the fourth round at both the Australian Open and the French Open, in 1999.

In 2003, Ulihrach was cleared of a doping charge.

At the 2007 French Open, he beat the No. 24 seed Dominik Hrbatý in the first round in five sets.

== ATP career finals ==
=== Singles: 9 (3 titles, 6 runner-ups) ===
Legend Grand Slam Tournaments (0–0) ATP World Tour Finals (0–0) ATP Masters 1000 (0–1) ATP 500 Series (0–0) ATP 250 Series (3–5)	Finals by surface Hard (0–2) Clay (3–4) Grass (0–0) Carpet (0–0)	Finals by setting Outdoors (3–6) Indoors (0–0)

Result	W–L	Date	Tournament	Tier	Surface	Opponent	Score
Loss	0–1	Jun 1995	St. Pölten, Austria	World Series	Clay	(Austria) Thomas Muster	3–6, 6–3, 1–6
Win	1–1	Aug 1995	Prague, Czech Republic	World Series	Clay	(Spain) Javier Sánchez	6–2, 6–2
Win	2–1	Nov 1995	Montevideo, Uruguay	World Series	Clay	(Spain) Alberto Berasategui	6–2, 6–3
Loss	2–2	May 1996	Prague, Czech Republic	World Series	Clay	(Russia) Yevgeny Kafelnikov	5–7, 6–1, 3–6
Loss	2–3	Mar 1997	Indian Wells, United States	Masters Series	Hard	(United States) Michael Chang	6–4, 3–6, 4–6, 3–6
Loss	2–4	May 1997	Prague, Czech Republic	World Series	Clay	(France) Cédric Pioline	2–6, 7–5, 6–7^{(4–7)}
Win	3–4	Aug 1998	Umag, Croatia	World Series	Clay	(Sweden) Magnus Norman	6–3, 7–6^{(7–0)}
Loss	3–5	Jan 2001	Doha, Qatar	World Series	Hard	(Chile) Marcelo Ríos	3–6, 6–2, 3–6
Loss	3–6	Jul 2001	Båstad, Sweden	World Series	Clay	(Italy) Andrea Gaudenzi	5–7, 3–6

== ATP Challenger and ITF Futures finals ==
=== Singles: 9 (6–3) ===
Legend ATP Challenger (6–3) ITF Futures (0–0)	Finals by surface Hard (0–0) Clay (6–3) Grass (0–0) Carpet (0–0)

Result	W–L	Date	Tournament	Tier	Surface	Opponent	Score
Win	1–0	Jul 1994	Oberstaufen, Germany	Challenger	Clay	(Morocco) Hicham Arazi	6–2, 6–0
Loss	1–1	Aug 1994	Plzeň, Czech Republic	Challenger	Clay	(Czech Republic) Radomír Vašek	6–2, 2–6, 2–6
Loss	1–2	Mar 1995	Agadir, Morocco	Challenger	Clay	(Spain) Óscar Martínez	6–3, 3–6, 3–6
Win	2–2	Apr 1995	Birmingham, United States	Challenger	Clay	(Czech Republic) Jiří Novák	6–4, 7–6
Win	3–2	Jun 1997	Prostějov, Czech Republic	Challenger	Clay	(Brazil) Fernando Meligeni	6–2, 4–6, 6–1
Win	4–2	Jun 2000	Szczecin, Poland	Challenger	Clay	(Spain) Alberto Martín	6–0, 6–2
Win	5–2	Jun 2001	Prostějov, Czech Republic	Challenger	Clay	(Czech Republic) Jiří Novák	6–4, 6–7^{(5–7)}, 6–3
Loss	5–3	Sep 2006	Szczecin, Poland	Challenger	Clay	(Ecuador) Nicolás Lapentti	6–3, 3–6, 3–6
Win	6–3	May 2007	Ostrava, Czech Republic	Challenger	Clay	(Czech Republic) Lukáš Dlouhý	6–4, 6–4

== Performance timeline ==
Key
W	F	SF	QF	#R	RR	Q#	DNQ	A	NH

(W) winner; (F) finalist; (SF) semifinalist; (QF) quarterfinalist; (#R) rounds 4, 3, 2, 1; (RR) round-robin stage; (Q#) qualification round; (DNQ) did not qualify; (A) absent; (NH) not held; (SR) strike rate (events won / competed); (W–L) win–loss record.

=== Singles ===
Tournament	1995	1996	1997	1998	1999	2000	2001	2002	2003	2004	2005	2006	2007	2008	SR	W–L	Win %
Grand Slam tournaments
Australian Open	A	2R	1R	A	4R	A	2R	1R	A	2R	2R	A	A	A	0 / 7	7–7	50%
French Open	2R	3R	2R	3R	4R	2R	3R	1R	A	1R	Q2	A	2R	Q2	0 / 10	13–10	57%
Wimbledon	1R	3R	A	2R	1R	1R	1R	1R	A	1R	1R	A	1R	A	0 / 10	3–10	23%
US Open	2R	2R	2R	2R	1R	1R	1R	1R	2R	Q1	A	Q3	A	A	0 / 9	5–9	36%
Win–loss	2–3	6–4	2–3	4–3	6–4	1–3	3–4	0–4	1–1	1–3	1–2	0–0	1–2	0–0	0 / 36	28–36	44%
ATP Masters Series
Indian Wells	A	A	F	3R	1R	A	3R	1R	A	1R	Q2	A	A	A	0 / 6	9–6	60%
Miami	A	A	2R	1R	2R	A	3R	1R	A	2R	Q1	A	A	A	0 / 6	3–6	33%
Monte Carlo	A	2R	3R	3R	2R	A	2R	2R	A	1R	Q1	A	A	A	0 / 7	8–7	53%
Hamburg	A	1R	A	2R	1R	A	2R	2R	A	A	A	A	A	A	0 / 5	3–5	38%
Rome	3R	2R	A	3R	1R	2R	1R	1R	A	A	A	A	A	A	0 / 7	6–7	46%
Stuttgart	A	2R	1R	3R	A	Q1	2R	Not Masters Series							0 / 4	4–4	50%
Canada	A	3R	A	A	A	A	QF	1R	A	A	A	A	A	A	0 / 3	5–3	63%
Cincinnati	A	A	A	A	A	A	2R	1R	A	A	A	A	A	A	0 / 2	1–2	33%
Paris	A	1R	3R	1R	A	Q2	2R	Q1	A	A	A	A	A	A	0 / 4	3–4	43%
Win–loss	2–1	5–6	9–5	9–7	1–5	1–1	12–9	2–7	0–0	1–3	0–0	0–0	0–0	0–0	0 / 44	42–44	49%
