= Branislav Stankovič =

Slovak tennis player

- Country (sports): Czechoslovakia (until 1992); Slovakia (from 1993)
- Residence: Bratislava
- Born: 30 May 1965 (age 61) Piešťany, Czechoslovakia
- Height: 1.75 m (5 ft 9 in)
- Plays: Right-handed
- Prize money: $167,847

Singles
- Career record: 7-20
- Career titles: 0
- Highest ranking: No. 86 (28 Dec 1987)

Grand Slam singles results
- French Open: 1R (1988)
- Wimbledon: 2R (1988, 1992)

Doubles
- Career record: 25-27
- Career titles: 1
- Highest ranking: No. 126 (29 Jul 1991)

Grand Slam doubles results
- French Open: 3R (1989)
Medal record
Representing Czechoslovakia
Summer Universiade
Gold medal – first place	1987 Zagreb	Doubles

Branislav Stankovič (born 30 May 1965) is a former professional tennis player from Slovakia.

== Career ==
Stankovič was a gold medal winner alongside Richard Vogel in the men's doubles at the 1987 Summer Universiade, which were held in Zagreb.

He reached the second round of the Wimbledon Championships in both 1988 and 1992, with wins over Todd Nelson and Andrew Foster respectively. He was more successful in the doubles, making it into the third round at the 1989 French Open, partnering Miloslav Mečíř.

In 1992, Stanković and Karel Nováček teamed up to win the Prague Open. His next best result on tour was a semi-final appearance in the doubles of the Austrian Open two years earlier.

He appeared in the doubles rubber of five Davis Cup ties for Slovakia and won them all, four times with Ján Krošlák and the other with Karol Kučera as his partner.

== ATP career finals ==
=== Doubles: 1 (1–0) ===
Result	W/L	Date	Tournament	Surface	Partner	Opponents	Score
Win	1–0	Aug 1992	Prague, Czechoslovakia	Clay	(Czechoslovakia) Karel Nováček	(Sweden) Jonas Björkman (Australia) Jon Ireland	7–5, 6–1

== Challenger titles ==
=== Singles: (1) ===
No.	Year	Tournament	Surface	Opponent	Score
1.	1987	Istanbul, Turkey	Clay	(Romania) Florin Segărceanu	6–2, 6–1

=== Doubles: (7) ===
No.	Year	Tournament	Surface	Partner	Opponents	Score
1.	1988	Bossonnens, Switzerland	Hard	(Ecuador) Hugo Núñez	(United States) Bret Garnett (United States) Bill Scanlon	6–4, 7–6
2.	1989	Eger, Hungary	Clay	(Czechoslovakia) Richard Vogel	(Romania) George Cosac (Romania) Florin Segărceanu	6–4, 3–6, 7–5
3.	1990	Parioli, Italy	Clay	(Czechoslovakia) Richard Vogel	(Italy) Nicola Bruno (Italy) Stefano Pescosolido	7–5, 6–3
4.	1990	Pescara, Italy	Clay	(Czechoslovakia) Richard Vogel	(Italy) Massimo Cierro (Italy) Alessandro de Minicis	6–3, 6–1
5.	1991	Nyon, Switzerland	Clay	(Czechoslovakia) Martin Damm	(United States) Otis Smith (Netherlands) Vincent Van Gelderen	6–1, 7–6
6.	1993	Ljubljana, Slovenia	Clay	(Czech Republic) Richard Vogel	(Netherlands) Hendrik Jan Davids (Croatia) Goran Prpić	6–4, 7–6
7.	1993	Kosice, Slovakia	Clay	(Slovakia) Marián Vajda	(Spain) Alejo Mancisidor (Spain) Federico Sánchez	6–2, 6–1
