= Václav Roubíček =

Czech tennis player (born 1967)

- Full name: Václav Roubíček
- Country (sports): Czechoslovakia; Czech Republic
- Born: 13 December 1967 (age 57); Ostrava, Czechoslovakia
- Plays: Right-handed
- Prize money: $121,317

Singles
- Career record: 4–11
- Career titles: 0
- Highest ranking: No. 135 (28 October 1991)

Doubles
- Career record: 1–3
- Career titles: 0
- Highest ranking: No. 401 (21 May 1990)

Václav Roubíček (born 13 December 1967) is a former professional tennis player from the Czech Republic.

== Biography ==
Roubíček, who comes from Ostrava, started playing tennis at the age of 10 and turned professional in 1987.

He won a Challenger tournament in Jakarta in 1991, a year in which he reached his career best ranking of 135 in the world.

On the Grand Prix circuit, later ATP Tour, he had his best performances at the Prague Open, where he made the second round on three occasions.

In 1993 he was beaten in the final round of qualifying at the French Open by Yevgeny Kafelnikov, who as a result qualified for his ever Grand Slam main draw.

He is now the tournament director for the Prosperita Open, a Challenger event held in Ostrava.

== Challenger titles ==
=== Singles: (1) ===
No.	Year	Tournament	Surface	Opponent	Score
1.	1991	Jakarta, Indonesia	Clay	(Australia) Simon Youl	6–3, 3–6, 6–3
