= Jaroslav Navrátil (tennis) =

Czechoslovak tennis player

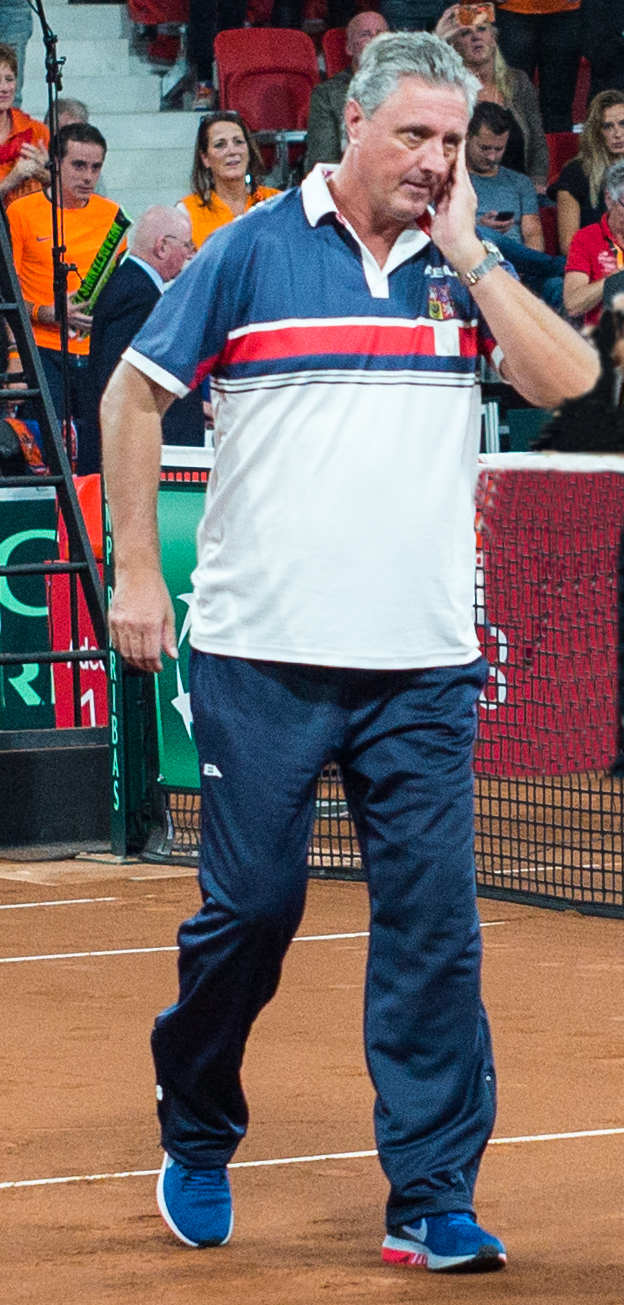
- Jaroslav Navrátil at the 2017 Davis Cup
- Country (sports): Czechoslovakia
- Born: 24 July 1957 (age 69) Přerov, Czechoslovakia
- Height: 6 ft 5 in (196 cm)
- Plays: Right-handed
- Prize money: $216,482

Singles
- Career record: 32–60
- Highest ranking: No. 64 (17 August 1987)

Grand Slam singles results
- French Open: 1R (1985, 1988)
- Wimbledon: 1R (1985, 1988)
- US Open: 2R (1987)

Doubles
- Career record: 70–78
- Career titles: 2
- Highest ranking: No. 31 (28 December 1987)

Grand Slam doubles results
- French Open: QF (1986, 1987)
- Wimbledon: 1R (1988, 1989)
- US Open: 1R (1985, 1987)

Jaroslav Navrátil (born 28 July 1957) is a Czech tennis coach and a former professional player. Navrátil had most of his tennis success while playing doubles. During his career, he achieved a career-high doubles ranking of world No. 31 in 1987.

== Coaching career ==
He was the captain of the Davis Cup team for the Czech Republic for eighteen years from 2006 to 2024, including their 2012 win.

He was the coach of fellow Czech player Jiří Veselý until 2023.

== Personal life ==
His son Michal is also a former tennis player and coach.

== Career finals ==
=== Doubles: 6 (2 wins / 4 losses) ===
Result	W/L	Date	Tournament	Surface	Partner	Opponents	Score
Loss	0–1	Mar 1985	Nancy, France	Hard	(Sweden) Jonas Svensson	(United States) Marcel Freeman (United States) Rodney Harmon	4–6, 6–7
Loss	0–2	Jun 1987	Athens, Greece	Clay	(Netherlands) Tom Nijssen	(West Germany) Tore Meinecke (West Germany) Ricki Osterthun	2–6, 6–3, 2–6
Loss	0–3	Aug 1987	Prague, Czechoslovakia	Clay	(Czechoslovakia) Stanislav Birner	(Czechoslovakia) Miloslav Mečíř (Czechoslovakia) Tomáš Šmíd	3–6, 7–6, 3–6
Loss	0–4	Oct 1987	Basel, Switzerland	Hard	(Czechoslovakia) Stanislav Birner	(Sweden) Anders Järryd (Czechoslovakia) Tomáš Šmíd	4–6, 3–6
Win	1–4	Feb 1988	Metz, France	Carpet	(Netherlands) Tom Nijssen	(United States) Rill Baxter (Nigeria) Nduka Odizor	6–2, 6–7, 7–6
Win	2–4	Aug 1988	Prague, Czechoslovakia	Clay	(Czechoslovakia) Petr Korda	(Austria) Thomas Muster (Austria) Horst Skoff	7–5, 7–6
