= I. ČLTK Prague =

Tennis club in Prague, Czech Republic

- I. ČLTK Praha
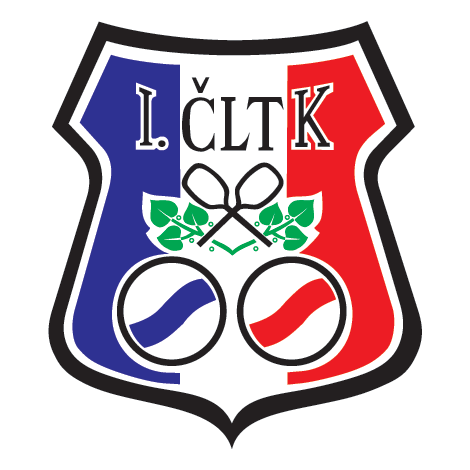
- Formation: 1893; 133 years ago
- Purpose: Sport
- Location: Prague, Czech Republic
- Coordinates: 50.0956°N 14.4403°E
- Chairman: Vladislav Šavrda
- Website: cltk.cz

I. ČLTK Prague (Czech: I. ČLTK Praha) is a tennis club and training center located in Prague, Czech Republic. Located on Štvanice in the center of the city, it is one of the most prestigious tennis clubs in the country.

== History ==
The club was founded in 1893. The current stadium seats 8,000 spectators, and was built to host the 1986 Federation Cup. The club hosts the annual I.ČLTK Prague Open on the ATP Challenger Tour and the ITF Women's Circuit.

Several scenes from the 2017 film Borg vs McEnroe were filmed at the club.

== Notable players ==
- Nikola Bartůňková
- Iveta Benešová
- Anastasia Dețiuc
- Jonáš Forejtek
- Jan Hernych
- Lucie Hradecká
- Roman Jebavý
- Martin Kližan
- Miriam Kolodziejová
- Michaëlla Krajicek
- Andrej Martin
- Tereza Martincová
- Jürgen Melzer
- Jan Minář
- Karolína Muchová
- Adam Pavlásek
- Andrew Paulson
- Jan Šátral
- Markéta Vondroušová
