= Vojtěch Flégl =

Czech tennis player (born 1967)

- Country (sports): Czechoslovakia
- Born: 24 June 1967 (age 59) Prague, Czechoslovakia
- Height: 1.80 m (5 ft 11 in)
- Plays: Right-handed
- Prize money: $328,104

Singles
- Career record: 0–1
- Career titles: 0
- Highest ranking: No. 466 (10 September 1990)

Doubles
- Career record: 99–143
- Career titles: 5
- Highest ranking: No. 58 (13 April 1992)

Grand Slam doubles results
- Australian Open: 2R (1995)
- French Open: 2R (1991, 1992, 1993)
- Wimbledon: 1R (1991, 1992, 1993, 1995)
- US Open: 1R (1991, 1995)

Vojtěch Flégl (born 24 June 1967) is a former professional tennis player from the former Czechoslovakia and later Czech Republic.

Flégl enjoyed most of his tennis success while playing doubles. During his career, he won five doubles titles. He achieved a career-high doubles ranking of World No. 58 in 1992.

== Career finals ==
=== Doubles (5 wins, 4 losses) ===
Result	W-L	Date	Tournament	Surface	Partner	Opponents	Score
Win	1–0	May 1990	Umag, Yugoslavia	Clay	(Czechoslovakia) Daniel Vacek	(Soviet Union) Andrei Cherkasov (Soviet Union) Andrei Olhovskiy	6–4, 6–4
Win	2–0	Aug 1990	Prague, Czechoslovakia	Clay	(Czechoslovakia) Daniel Vacek	(Romania) George Cosac (Romania) Florin Segărceanu	5–7, 6–4, 6–3
Win	3–0	Aug 1990	San Marino	Clay	(Czechoslovakia) Daniel Vacek	(Spain) Jordi Burillo (Spain) Marcos Aurelio Gorriz	6–1, 4–6, 7–6
Loss	3–1	Apr 1991	Nice, France	Clay	(Sweden) Nicklas Utgren	(Sweden) Rikard Bergh (Sweden) Jan Gunnarsson	4–6, 6–4, 3–6
Win	4–1	Aug 1991	Prague, Czechoslovakia	Clay	(Czechoslovakia) Cyril Suk	(Czechoslovakia) Libor Pimek (Czechoslovakia) Daniel Vacek	6–4, 6–2
Loss	4–2	Jul 1992	Kitzbühel, Austria	Clay	(Argentina) Horacio de la Peña	(Spain) Sergio Casal (Spain) Emilio Sánchez	1–6, 2–6
Loss	4–3	Sep 1992	Palermo, Italy	Clay	(Argentina) Horacio de la Peña	(Sweden) Johan Donar (Sweden) Ola Jonsson	7–5, 3–6, 4–6
Loss	4–4	May 1994	Bologna, Italy	Clay	(Australia) Andrew Florent	(Australia) John Fitzgerald (Australia) Patrick Rafter	3–6, 3–6
Win	5–4	Jun 1994	St. Pölten, Austria	Clay	(Australia) Andrew Florent	(Malaysia) Adam Malik (United States) Jeff Tarango	3–6, 6–1, 6–4
