= Karel Nováček =

Czech tennis player (born 1965)

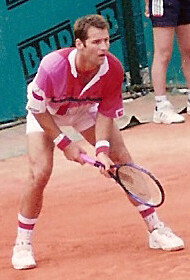
- Country (sports): Czechoslovakia (1984–92); Czech Republic (1993–96)
- Residence: Boca Raton, Florida
- Born: 30 March 1965 (age 61) Prostějov, Czechoslovakia
- Height: 1.90 m (6 ft 3 in)
- Turned pro: 1984
- Retired: 1996
- Plays: Right-handed (one-handed backhand)
- Prize money: $3,729,540

Singles
- Career record: 299–246
- Career titles: 13
- Highest ranking: No. 8 (18 November 1991)

Grand Slam singles results
- Australian Open: 4R (1995)
- French Open: QF (1987, 1993)
- Wimbledon: 4R (1991)
- US Open: SF (1994)

Other tournaments
- Tour Finals: RR (1991)
- Grand Slam Cup: 1R (1994)

Doubles
- Career record: 168–179
- Career titles: 6
- Highest ranking: No. 25 (28 February 1994)

Grand Slam doubles results
- Australian Open: SF (1994)
- French Open: QF (1990)
- Wimbledon: 3R (1994)
- US Open: F (1993)

Karel Nováček (born 30 March 1965) is a retired Czech former top ten tennis player born in Prostějov, Czechoslovakia (Czech Republic). In his career, Nováček won 13 singles titles and six doubles titles. His highest singles ranking was World No. 8, which he achieved on 18 November 1991.

His best performance at a Grand Slam came at the 1994 US Open where he defeated Alexander Vladimirovich Volkov, Andriy Medvedev, Todd Woodbridge, Javier Frana and Jaime Yzaga before losing to Michael Stich in the semifinal. In 1997, Novacek was suspended for three months for failing a drug test at the 1995 French Open; he forfeited $185,765, but denied taking cocaine knowingly.

Nováček lived in Boca Raton, Florida, United States for 20 years, and then moved back to the Czech Republic. Karel and Maya Nováček married in 1990; as of 2002, they had three children. In 2002, the Boca Raton News reported that their ten-year-old daughter Anika was a promising tennis player, winning several tournaments.

== Career finals ==
=== Singles (13 titles, 7 runners-up) ===
Legend (singles)
Grand Slam (0–0)
Tennis Masters Cup (0–0)
ATP Masters Series (1–0)
ATP Tour (12–7)

Result	W-L	Date	Tournament	Surface	Opponent	Score
Win	1–0	Aug 1986	Washington, U.S.	Clay	(France) Thierry Tulasne	6–1, 7–6^{(7–4)}
Loss	1–1	Oct 1986	Vienna, Austria	Hard (i)	(United States) Brad Gilbert	6–3, 3–6, 5–7, 0–6
Loss	1–2	Oct 1987	Palermo, Italy	Clay	(Argentina) Martín Jaite	6–7^{(5–7)}, 7–6^{(9–7)}, 4–6
Win	2–2	Jul 1989	Hilversum, Netherlands	Clay	(Spain) Emilio Sánchez	6–2, 6–4
Win	3–2	May 1990	Munich, West Germany	Clay	(Austria) Thomas Muster	6–4, 6–2
Loss	3–3	Aug 1990	Kitzbühel, Austria	Clay	(Argentina) Horacio de la Peña	4–6, 6–7^{(4–7)}, 6–2, 2–6
Win	4–3	Jan 1991	Auckland, New Zealand	Hard	(France) Jean-Philippe Fleurian	7–6^{(7–5)}, 7–6^{(7–4)}
Loss	4–4	Apr 1991	Estoril, Portugal	Clay	(Spain) Sergi Bruguera	6–7^{(7–9)}, 1–6
Win	5–4	May 1991	Hamburg, Germany	Clay	(Sweden) Magnus Gustafsson	6–3, 6–3, 5–7, 0–6, 6–1
Win	6–4	Aug 1991	Kitzbühel, Austria	Clay	(Sweden) Magnus Gustafsson	7–6^{(7–2)}, 7–6^{(7–4)}, 6–2
Win	7–4	Aug 1991	Prague, Czechoslovakia	Clay	(Sweden) Magnus Gustafsson	7–6^{(7–5)}, 6–2
Win	8–4	Jul 1992	Hilversum, Netherlands	Clay	(Spain) Jordi Arrese	6–2, 6–3, 2–6, 7–5
Win	9–4	Aug 1992	San Marino, San Marino	Clay	(Spain) Francisco Clavet	7–5, 6–2
Win	10–4	Aug 1992	Prague, Czechoslovakia	Clay	(Argentina) Franco Davín	6–1, 6–1
Win	11–4	Feb 1993	Dubai, U.A.E.	Hard	(France) Fabrice Santoro	6–4, 7–5
Loss	11–5	Feb 1993	Rotterdam, Netherlands	Carpet	(Sweden) Anders Järryd	3–6, 5–7
Win	12–5	Mar 1993	Zaragoza, Spain	Clay	(Sweden) Jonas Svensson	3–6, 6–2, 6–1
Loss	12–6	Apr 1993	Estoril, Portugal	Clay	(Ukraine) Andriy Medvedev	4–6, 2–6
Loss	12–7	Jul 1993	Gstaad, Switzerland	Clay	(Spain) Sergi Bruguera	3–6, 4–6
Win	13–7	Aug 1994	Hilversum, Netherlands	Clay	(Australia) Richard Fromberg	7–5, 6–4, 7–6^{(9–7)}

=== Doubles (6 titles, 10 runners-up) ===
Result	W-L	Date	Tournament	Surface	Partner	Opponents	Score
Loss	0–1	Jun 1988	Athens, Greece	Clay	(Peru) Pablo Arraya	(Sweden) Rikard Bergh (Sweden) Per Henricsson	4–6, 5–7
Loss	0–2	Aug 1989	Båstad, Swedish	Clay	(Czechoslovakia) Josef Čihák	(Sweden) Per Henricsson (Sweden) Nicklas Utgren	5–7, 2–6
Win	1–2	Oct 1991	Berlin, Germany	Carpet	(Czechoslovakia) Petr Korda	(Netherlands) Jan Siemerink (Czechoslovakia) Daniel Vacek	3–6, 7–5, 7–5
Loss	1–3	Apr 1992	Barcelona, Spain	Clay	(United States) Ivan Lendl	(Ecuador) Andrés Gómez (Spain) Javier Sánchez	4–6, 4–6
Loss	1–4	Apr 1992	Monte Carlo, Monaco	Clay	(Czechoslovakia) Petr Korda	(Germany) Boris Becker (Germany) Michael Stich	4–6, 4–6
Win	2–4	Aug 1992	Prague, Czechoslovakia	Clay	(Czechoslovakia) Branislav Stankovič	(Sweden) Jonas Björkman (Australia) Jon Ireland	7–5, 6–1
Loss	2–5	Oct 1992	Basel, Switzerland	Hard (i)	(Czechoslovakia) David Rikl	(Netherlands) Tom Nijssen (Czechoslovakia) Cyril Suk	3–6, 4–6
Win	3–5	Mar 1993	Zaragoza, Spain	Carpet	(Czech Republic) Martin Damm	(United States) Mike Bauer (Czech Republic) David Rikl	2–6, 6–4, 7–5
Loss	3–6	May 1993	Munich, Germany	Clay	(Germany) Carl-Uwe Steeb	(Czech Republic) Martin Damm (Sweden) Henrik Holm	0–6, 6–3, 5–7
Loss	3–7	Sep 1993	U.S. Open, New York	Hard	(Czech Republic) Martin Damm	(United States) Ken Flach (United States) Rick Leach	7–6, 4–6, 2–6
Loss	3–8	Mar 1994	Zaragoza, Spain	Carpet	(Czech Republic) Martin Damm	(Sweden) Henrik Holm (Sweden) Anders Järryd	5–7, 2–6
Win	4–8	Aug 1994	Prague, Czech Republic	Clay	(Sweden) Mats Wilander	(Czech Republic) Tomáš Krupa (Czech Republic) Pavel Vízner	W/O
Win	5–8	Oct 1994	Ostrava, Czech Republic	Carpet	(Czech Republic) Martin Damm	(South Africa) Gary Muller (South Africa) Piet Norval	6–4, 1–6, 6–3
Win	6–8	Oct 1994	Santiago, Chile	Clay	(Sweden) Mats Wilander	(Spain) Tomás Carbonell (Spain) Francisco Roig	4–6, 7–6, 7–6
Loss	6–9	Feb 1995	Milan, Italy	Carpet	(Czech Republic) Petr Korda	(Germany) Boris Becker (France) Guy Forget	2–6, 4–6
Loss	6–10	Feb 1996	Dubai, UAE	Hard	(Czech Republic) Jiří Novák	(Zimbabwe) Byron Black (Canada) Grant Connell	0–6, 1–6

== Singles performance timeline ==
Key
W	F	SF	QF	#R	RR	Q#	DNQ	A	NH

(W) winner; (F) finalist; (SF) semifinalist; (QF) quarterfinalist; (#R) rounds 4, 3, 2, 1; (RR) round-robin stage; (Q#) qualification round; (DNQ) did not qualify; (A) absent; (NH) not held; (SR) strike rate (events won / competed); (W–L) win–loss record.

Tournament	1984	1985	1986	1987	1988	1989	1990	1991	1992	1993	1994	1995	1996	Career SR
Grand Slam tournaments
Australian Open	A	A	NH	A	A	A	3R	1R	2R	A	3R	4R	A	0 / 5
French Open	3R	1R	1R	QF	1R	3R	4R	1R	1R	QF	1R	1R	A	0 / 12
Wimbledon	A	A	1R	1R	2R	2R	3R	4R	1R	1R	1R	1R	A	0 / 10
US Open	A	A	1R	1R	A	A	1R	3R	A	3R	SF	1R	A	0 / 7
Grand Slam SR	0 / 1	0 / 1	0 / 3	0 / 3	0 / 2	0 / 2	0 / 4	0 / 4	0 / 3	0 / 3	0 / 4	0 / 4	0 / 0	0 / 34
ATP Masters Series
Indian Wells	Not MS1 Before 1990						1R	A	3R	A	A	1R	A	0 / 3
Key Biscayne	Not MS1 Before 1990						2R	2R	2R	A	A	2R	1R	0 / 5
Monte Carlo	Not MS1 Before 1990						2R	1R	3R	1R	1R	2R	A	0 / 6
Rome	Not MS1 Before 1990						2R	1R	1R	3R	1R	1R	A	0 / 6
Hamburg	Not MS1 Before 1990						1R	W	QF	3R	1R	A	A	1 / 5
Canada	Not MS1 Before 1990						A	A	A	A	A	A	A	0 / 0
Cincinnati	Not MS1 Before 1990						1R	A	A	A	1R	A	A	0 / 2
Stuttgart (Stockholm)	Not MS1 Before 1990						2R	3R	3R	A	A	A	A	0 / 3
Paris	Not MS1 Before 1990						1R	QF	1R	3R	A	A	A	0 / 4
Masters Series SR	N/A						0 / 8	1 / 6	0 / 7	0 / 4	0 / 4	0 / 4	0 / 1	1 / 34
Year-end ranking	138	159	33	76	127	74	34	8	23	17	28	121	409	N/A

== Records ==
Time span	Other selected records	Players matched
1987	Triple bagel win (6–0, 6–0, 6–0)	Nikola Špear; Stefan Edberg; Ivan Lendl; Sergi Bruguera

== See also ==
- List of sportspeople sanctioned for doping offences
