= Prague Open (1987–1999) =

Defunct tennis tournament
- Event name: Čedok Open (1987–1989); Czechoslovakia Open (1990–1991); Škoda Czech Open (1992–1996); Paegas Czech Open (1997–1999)
- Tour: Grand Prix circuit (1987–89); ATP Tour (1990–99)
- Founded: 1987
- Abolished: 1999
- Editions: 13
- Location: Prague, Czech Republic
- Venue: I. ČLTK Prague
- Surface: Clay / outdoor

The Prague Open was a Grand Prix and ATP affiliated men's tennis tournament played from 1987 to 1999. It was held in Prague in the Czech Republic (formerly Czechoslovakia) and played on outdoor clay courts.

Karel Nováček and Sergi Bruguera were singles title holders as they won two editions each one. Vojtěch Flégl, Karel Nováček and Daniel Vacek were the doubles title record holders with two victories each one. Karel Nováček was also a singles and doubles winner in the same year, and so was Yevgeny Kafelnikov.

== Results ==
=== Singles ===
| Year | Champions | Runners-up | Score |
|---|---|---|---|
| 1987 | (Czechoslovakia) Marián Vajda | (Czechoslovakia) Tomáš Šmíd | 3–6, 6–3, 6–3 |
| 1988 | (Austria) Thomas Muster | (Argentina) Guillermo Pérez Roldán | 6–4, 5–7, 6–2 |
| 1989 | (Uruguay) Marcelo Filippini | (Austria) Horst Skoff | 7–5, 7–6^{(7–4)} |
| 1990 | (Spain) Jordi Arrese | (Sweden) Nicklas Kulti | 7–6^{(7–3)}, 7–6^{(8–6)} |
| 1991 | (Czechoslovakia) Karel Nováček (1) | (Sweden) Magnus Gustafsson | 7–6^{(7–5)}, 6–2 |
| 1992 | (Czechoslovakia) Karel Nováček (2) | (Argentina) Franco Davín | 6–1, 6–1 |
| 1993 | (Spain) Sergi Bruguera (1) | (Russia) Andrei Chesnokov | 7–5, 6–4 |
| 1994 | (Spain) Sergi Bruguera (2) | (Ukraine) Andriy Medvedev | 6–3, 6–4 |
| 1995 | (Czech Republic) Bohdan Ulihrach | (Spain) Javier Sánchez | 6–2, 6–2 |
| 1996 | (Russia) Yevgeny Kafelnikov | (Czech Republic) Bohdan Ulihrach | 7–5, 1–6, 6–3 |
| 1997 | (France) Cédric Pioline | (Czech Republic) Bohdan Ulihrach | 6–2, 5–7, 7–6^{(7–4)} |
| 1998 | (Brazil) Fernando Meligeni | (Czech Republic) Ctislav Doseděl | 6–1, 6–4 |
| 1999 | (Slovakia) Dominik Hrbatý | (Czech Republic) Ctislav Doseděl | 6–2, 6–2 |

=== Doubles ===
| Year | Champions | Runners-up | Score |
|---|---|---|---|
| 1987 | (Czechoslovakia) Miloslav Mečíř (Czechoslovakia) Tomáš Šmíd | (Czechoslovakia) Stanislav Birner (Czechoslovakia) Jaroslav Navrátil | 6–3, 6–7, 6–3 |
| 1988 | (Czechoslovakia) Petr Korda (Czechoslovakia) Jaroslav Navrátil | (Austria) Thomas Muster (Austria) Horst Skoff | 7–5, 7–6 |
| 1989 | (Spain) Jordi Arrese (Austria) Horst Skoff | (Czechoslovakia) Petr Korda (Czechoslovakia) Tomáš Šmíd | 6–4, 6–4 |
| 1990 | (Czechoslovakia) Vojtěch Flégl (1) (Czechoslovakia) Daniel Vacek (1) | (Romania) George Cosac (Romania) Florin Segărceanu | 5–7, 6–4, 6–3 |
| 1991 | (Czechoslovakia) Vojtěch Flégl (2) (Czechoslovakia) Cyril Suk | (Belgium) Libor Pimek (Czechoslovakia) Daniel Vacek | 6–4, 6–2 |
| 1992 | (Czechoslovakia) Karel Nováček (1) (Czechoslovakia) Branislav Stanković | (Sweden) Jonas Björkman (Australia) Jon Ireland | 7–5, 6–1 |
| 1993 | (Netherlands) Hendrik Jan Davids (Belgium) Libor Pimek | (Mexico) Jorge Lozano (Brazil) Jaime Oncins | 6–3, 7–6 |
| 1994 | (Czech Republic) Karel Nováček (2) (Sweden) Mats Wilander | (Czech Republic) Tomáš Krupa (Czech Republic) Pavel Vízner | W/O |
| 1995 | (Belgium) Libor Pimek (South Africa) Byron Talbot | (Czech Republic) Jiří Novák (Czech Republic) David Rikl | 7–5, 1–6, 7–6 |
| 1996 | (Russia) Yevgeny Kafelnikov (Czech Republic) Daniel Vacek (2) | (Argentina) Luis Lobo (Spain) Javier Sánchez | 6–3, 6–7, 6–3 |
| 1997 | (India) Mahesh Bhupathi (India) Leander Paes | (Czech Republic) Petr Luxa (Czech Republic) David Škoch | 6–1, 6–1 |
| 1998 | (Australia) Wayne Arthurs (Australia) Andrew Kratzmann | (Sweden) Fredrik Bergh (Sweden) Nicklas Kulti | 6–1, 6–1 |
| 1999 | (Czech Republic) Martin Damm (Czech Republic) Radek Štěpánek | (United States) Mark Keil (Ecuador) Nicolás Lapentti | 6–0, 6–2 |

== See also ==
- Czechoslovakian International Championships
- I.ČLTK Prague Open
