= 1991 Kremlin Cup – Singles =

Singles
- 1991 Kremlin Cup

Final
- Champion: (Soviet Union) Andrei Cherkasov
- Runner-up: (Switzerland) Jakob Hlasek
- Score: 7–6^{(7–2)}, 3–6, 7–6^{(7–5)}

Details
- Draw: 32 (4 Q / 2 WC )
- Seeds: 8

Events
Singles	Doubles
← 1990 ·	Kremlin Cup	· 1992 →

Andrei Cherkasov was the defending champion and won in the final 7–6^{(7–2)}, 3–6, 7–6^{(7–5)}, against Jakob Hlasek.

== Seeds ==
1. (Czechoslovakia) Karel Nováček (second round)
2. (Czechoslovakia) Petr Korda (first round)
3. (Switzerland) Jakob Hlasek (final)
4. (Soviet Union) Andrei Cherkasov (champion)
5. (Netherlands) Jan Siemerink (quarterfinals)
6. n/a
7. (Austria) Horst Skoff (first round)
8. (Soviet Union) Alexander Volkov (semifinals)

== Draw ==
=== Key ===
- Q = Qualifier
- WC = Wild card
- LL = Lucky loser
- Alt = Alternate
- SE = Special exempt
- PR = Protected ranking
- ITF = ITF entry
- JE = Junior exempt
- w/o = Walkover
- r = Retired
- d = Defaulted
- SR = Special ranking

=== Finals ===
Semifinals
(Spain) Marcos Aurelio Gorriz	3	4
4	(Soviet Union) Andrei Cherkasov	6	6
3	(Switzerland) Jakob Hlasek	6	6
8	(Soviet Union) Alexander Volkov	4	2

Final
4	(Soviet Union) Andrei Cherkasov	7^{7}	3	7^{7}
3	(Switzerland) Jakob Hlasek	6^{2}	6	6^{5}

=== Top half ===
First round
1	(Czechoslovakia) K Nováček	7^{7}	6
(Germany) U Riglewski	6^{5}	2
(Germany) C-U Steeb	6	7^{7}
(Israel) A Mansdorf	3	6^{2}
(Spain) MA Gorriz	2	6	6
Q	(Netherlands) HJ Davids	6	3	2
(Sweden) T Högstedt	6	6
7	(Austria) H Skoff	3	0
4	(Soviet Union) A Cherkasov	6	6
Q	(Germany) F Krumrey	3	4
WC	(Soviet Union) A Medvedev	7	6
(Australia) T Woodbridge	5	2
(Australia) J Stoltenberg	3	6	6
(Netherlands) R Krajicek	6	3	4
(Switzerland) M Rosset	6	6
LL	(France) S Soulié	4	3

Second round
1	(Czechoslovakia) K Nováček	3	5
(Germany) C-U Steeb	6	7
(Spain) MA Gorriz	w/o
(Sweden) T Högstedt
4	(Soviet Union) A Cherkasov	6	6
WC	(Soviet Union) A Medvedev	3	2
(Australia) J Stoltenberg	5	3
(Switzerland) M Rosset	7	6

Quarterfinals
(Germany) C-U Steeb	6	2	6^{6}
(Spain) MA Gorriz	2	6	7^{8}
4	(Soviet Union) A Cherkasov	4	6	7
(Switzerland) M Rosset	6	1	5

Semifinals
(Spain) MA Gorriz	3	4
4	(Soviet Union) A Cherkasov	6	6

=== Bottom half ===
First round
5	(Netherlands) J Siemerink	6	6
(Germany) E Jelen	1	4
(United States) C Adams	6	4	6
(Germany) L Koslowski	3	6	4
Q	(Germany) R Haas	6	6
WC	(Soviet Union) S Skakun	1	2
Q	(Czechoslovakia) B Stanković	6	3	6^{3}
3	(Switzerland) J Hlasek	4	6	7^{7}
8	(Soviet Union) A Volkov	6	3	6
(Italy) D Nargiso	3	6	3
(Soviet Union) D Poliakov	6	4
(France) A Boetsch	0	1^{r}
(United States) J Grabb	3	7	7
(United States) T Mayotte	6	5	5
(Australia) M Woodforde	0	6	6
2	(Czechoslovakia) P Korda	6	2	3

Second round
5	(Netherlands) J Siemerink	6	6
(United States) C Adams	3	3
Q	(Germany) R Haas	3	4
3	(Switzerland) J Hlasek	6	6
8	(Soviet Union) A Volkov	7	6
(Soviet Union) D Poliakov	5	3
(United States) J Grabb	7^{7}	6
(Australia) M Woodforde	6^{3}	2

Quarterfinals
5	(Netherlands) J Siemerink	7^{7}	2	2
3	(Switzerland) J Hlasek	6^{5}	6	6
8	(Soviet Union) A Volkov	7^{7}	4	6
(United States) J Grabb	6^{1}	6	3

Semifinals
3	(Switzerland) J Hlasek	6	6
8	(Soviet Union) A Volkov	4	2
