= 1991 Muratti Time Indoor – Singles =

Singles
- 1991 Muratti Time Indoor

Final
- Champion: (Soviet Union) Alexander Volkov
- Runner-up: (Italy) Cristiano Caratti
- Score: 6–1, 7–5

Details
- Draw: 32 (3WC/4Q/1LL)
- Seeds: 8

Events
Singles	Doubles
- Milan Indoor

Ivan Lendl was the defending champion, but lost in the second round to Cristiano Caratti.

Alexander Volkov won the title by defeating Caratti 6–1, 7–5 in the final.

== Seeds ==
1. (Czechoslovakia) Ivan Lendl (second round)
2. (Socialist Federal Republic of Yugoslavia) Goran Ivanišević (first round)
3. (Soviet Union) Andrei Chesnokov (second round)
4. (United States) Michael Chang (first rounf)
5. (Switzerland) Jakob Hlasek (semifinals)
6. (United States) Aaron Krickstein (quarterfinals)
7. (Switzerland) Marc Rosset (first round)
8. (Soviet Union) Alexander Volkov (champion)

== Draw ==
Key

- Q = Qualifier
- WC = Wild card
- LL = Lucky loser
- Alt = Alternate
- ITF = ITF entry
- PR = Protected ranking
- SR = Special ranking
- SE = Special exempt
- JE = Junior exempt
- JR = Junior Accelerator Programme entrant
- CO = College Accelerator Programme entrant
- NG = Next Gen Accelerator Program entrant
- w/o = Walkover
- r = Retired
- d = Defaulted

=== Finals ===
Semifinals
WC	(Italy) Cristiano Caratti	7^{8}	6^{5}	6
(Germany) Carl-Uwe Steeb	6^{6}	7^{7}	3
5	(Switzerland) Jakob Hlasek	4	3
8	(Soviet Union) Alexander Volkov	6	6

Final
WC	(Italy) Cristiano Caratti	1	5
8	(Soviet Union) Alexander Volkov	6	7

=== Top half ===
First round
1	(Czechoslovakia) I Lendl	7	4	7
(Sweden) M Larsson	5	6	5
WC	(Italy) C Caratti	7^{7}	6
(Sweden) P Lundgren	6^{4}	2
WC	(Italy) D Nargiso	7	6
(Italy) O Camporese	5	4
(Sweden) N Kulti	6	6
7	(Switzerland) M Rosset	3	4
4	(United States) M Chang	1	5
(Germany) CU Steeb	6	7
(Czechoslovakia) K Nováček	6	6
(Haiti) R Agénor	4	2
(France) T Champion	6	7^{7}
(Netherlands) M Koevermans	4	6^{3}
(Israel) A Mansdorf	0	1
6	(United States) A Krickstein	6	6

Second round
1	(Czechoslovakia) I Lendl	4	6	6^{3}
WC	(Italy) C Caratti	6	1	7^{7}
WC	(Italy) D Nargiso	6^{4}	1
(Sweden) N Kulti	7^{7}	6
(Germany) CU Steeb	4	7^{7}	6
(Czechoslovakia) K Nováček	6	6^{1}	4
(France) T Champion	0^{r}
6	(United States) A Krickstein	4

Quarterfinals
WC	(Italy) C Caratti	6	6
(Sweden) N Kulti	3	1
(Germany) CU Steeb	6	7^{7}
6	(United States) A Krickstein	3	6^{4}

Semifinals
WC	(Italy) C Caratti	7^{8}	6^{5}	6
(Germany) CU Steeb	6^{6}	7^{7}	3

=== Bottom half ===
First round
5	(Switzerland) J Hlasek	7^{7}	6
(United States) T Witsken	6^{2}	2
Q	(Italy) Roberto Raffa	0	1
(Sweden) A Järryd	6	6
LL	(Sweden) J Gunnarsson	6	6
Q	(Switzerland) C Mezzadri	3	3
Q	(Italy) S Soresini	3	3
3	(Soviet Union) A Chesnokov	6	6
8	(Soviet Union) A Volkov	6	6^{4}	6
Q	(France) C Pioline	4	7^{7}	4
(South Africa) C van Rensburg	4	2
(Germany) E Jelen	6	6
(Soviet Union) A Cherkasov	5	6	6^{4}
WC	(Australia) P Cash	7	4	7^{7}
(Socialist Federal Republic of Yugoslavia) G Prpić	6	3	6
2	(Socialist Federal Republic of Yugoslavia) G Ivanišević	3	6	4

Second round
5	(Switzerland) J Hlasek	6	0	6
(Sweden) A Järryd	3	6	4
LL	(Sweden) J Gunnarsson	6	6
3	(Soviet Union) A Chesnokov	4	3
8	(Soviet Union) A Volkov	6	3	7^{7}
(Germany) E Jelen	3	6	6^{2}
WC	(Australia) P Cash	7	6
(Socialist Federal Republic of Yugoslavia) G Prpić	5	3

Quarterfinals
5	(Switzerland) J Hlasek	6	7^{7}
LL	(Sweden) J Gunnarsson	0	6^{5}
8	(Soviet Union) A Volkov	6	6
WC	(Australia) P Cash	4	4

Semifinals
5	(Switzerland) J Hlasek	4	3
8	(Soviet Union) A Volkov	6	6
