= 1993 Kremlin Cup – Singles =

Singles
- 1993 Kremlin Cup

Final
- Champion: (Switzerland) Marc Rosset
- Runner-up: (Germany) Patrik Kühnen
- Score: 6–4, 6–3

Details
- Draw: 32 (4 Q / 3 WC )
- Seeds: 8

Events
| Singles | Doubles |
| ← 1992 · | Kremlin Cup | · 1994 → |

Marc Rosset defend his title, winning in the final 6–4, 6–3 against Patrik Kühnen.

== Seeds ==
1. (Switzerland) Marc Rosset (champion)
2. (Russia) Alexander Volkov (second round, withdrew)
3. (Israel) Amos Mansdorf (first round)
4. (Russia) Andrei Cherkasov (second round)
5. (United States) Jonathan Stark (second round)
6. (Switzerland) Jakob Hlasek (second round)
7. (Netherlands) Paul Haarhuis (quarterfinals)
8. (Sweden) Christian Bergström (first round)

== Draw ==
=== Key ===
- Q = Qualifier
- WC = Wild card
- LL = Lucky loser
- Alt = Alternate
- SE = Special exempt
- PR = Protected ranking
- ITF = ITF entry
- JE = Junior exempt
- w/o = Walkover
- r = Retired
- d = Defaulted
- SR = Special ranking

=== Finals ===
Semifinals
1 | (Switzerland) Marc Rosset | 6 | 2 | 6
Q | (Ukraine) Dimitri Poliakov | 3 | 6 | 3
(Germany) Patrik Kühnen | 7^{7} | 7^{7}
(Germany) Karsten Braasch | 6^{3} | 6^{2}

Final
1 | (Switzerland) Marc Rosset | 6 | 6
(Germany) Patrik Kühnen | 4 | 3

=== Top half ===
First round
1 | (Switzerland) M Rosset | 6 | 6
(Sweden) J Björkman | 3 | 3
(Denmark) K Carlsen | 6 | 3 | 2
WC | (Russia) Y Kafelnikov | 4 | 6 | 6
WC | (The Bahamas) M Knowles | 6 | 1
(Sweden) T Enqvist | 1 | 3^{r}
(Germany) D Prinosil | 3 | 2
7 | (Netherlands) P Haarhuis | 6 | 6
3 | (Israel) A Mansdorf | 3 | 6 | 4
Q | (Ukraine) D Poliakov | 6 | 4 | 6
(Germany) C-U Steeb | 6 | 3 | 2
(Zimbabwe) B Black | 3 | 6 | 6
(Netherlands) J Eltingh | 2 | 6^{3}
(Czech Republic) M Damm | 6 | 7^{7}
Q | (South Africa) J de Beer | 0 | 6^{2}
6 | (Switzerland) J Hlasek | 6 | 7^{7}

Second round
1 | (Switzerland) M Rosset | 7^{7} | 3 | 7
WC | (Russia) Y Kafelnikov | 6^{4} | 6 | 5
WC | (The Bahamas) M Knowles | 6 | 3 | 5
7 | (Netherlands) P Haarhuis | 2 | 6 | 7
Q | (Ukraine) D Poliakov | 6 | 6
(Zimbabwe) B Black | 0 | 3
(Czech Republic) M Damm | 7^{7} | 6
6 | (Switzerland) J Hlasek | 6^{5} | 3

Quarterfinals
1 | (Switzerland) M Rosset | 6 | 6
7 | (Netherlands) P Haarhuis | 4 | 2
Q | (Ukraine) D Poliakov | 6 | 7^{7}
(Czech Republic) M Damm | 3 | 6^{5}

Semifinals
1 | (Switzerland) M Rosset | 6 | 2 | 6
Q | (Ukraine) D Poliakov | 3 | 6 | 3

=== Bottom half ===
First round
5 | (United States) J Stark | 6 | 6
(South Africa) C van Rensburg | 3 | 1
Q | (Sweden) T Högstedt | 0 | 4
(Russia) A Olhovskiy | 6 | 6
(Germany) B Karbacher | 7 | 6^{5} | 0
(Germany) P Kühnen | 5 | 7^{7} | 6
(Italy) D Nargiso | 6^{1} | 5
4 | (Russia) A Cherkasov | 7^{7} | 7
8 | (Sweden) C Bergström | 4 | 0
(United States) J Tarango | 6 | 6
(Austria) A Antonitsch | 2 | 6^{3}
(Germany) K Braasch | 6 | 7^{7}
(Czech Republic) D Vacek | 6^{4} | 2
Q | (Russia) A Merinov | 7^{7} | 6
WC | (Sweden) B Borg | 6 | 3 | 6^{7}
2 | (Russia) A Volkov | 4 | 6 | 7^{9}

Second round
5 | (United States) J Stark | 6^{4} | 3
(Russia) A Olhovskiy | 7^{7} | 6
(Germany) P Kühnen | 6 | 1 | 6
4 | (Russia) A Cherkasov | 3 | 6 | 3
(United States) J Tarango | 6 | 2 | 2
(Germany) K Braasch | 3 | 6 | 6
Q | (Russia) A Merinov | w/o
2 | (Russia) A Volkov

Quarterfinals
(Russia) A Olhovskiy | 4 | 6^{4}
(Germany) P Kühnen | 6 | 7^{7}
(Germany) K Braasch | 6 | 6
Q | (Russia) A Merinov | 2 | 3

Semifinals
(Germany) P Kühnen | 7^{7} | 7^{7}
(Germany) K Braasch | 6^{3} | 6^{2}
