= 1992 Kremlin Cup =

1992 tennis tournament

- Date: 9–15 November
- Edition: 3rd
- Category: ATP World Series
- Draw: 32S / 16D
- Prize money: $315,000
- Surface: Carpet/ indoor
- Location: Moscow, CIS
- Venue: Olympic Stadium

Champions

Singles
- (Switzerland) Marc Rosset

Doubles
- (South Africa) Marius Barnard / (South Africa) John-Laffnie de Jager
← 1991 ·	Kremlin Cup	· 1993 →

The 1992 Kremlin Cup was a men's tennis tournament played on indoor carpet courts. It was the 3rd edition of the Kremlin Cup, and was part of the International Series of the 1992 ATP Tour. It took place at the Olympic Stadium in Moscow, Commonwealth of Independent States, from 9 November through 15 November 1992. Eighth-seeded Marc Rosset won the singles title.

== Finals ==
=== Singles ===
(Switzerland) Marc Rosset defeated (Germany) Carl-Uwe Steeb, 6–2, 6–2

- It was Rosset's 2nd singles title of the year and 4th title overall.

=== Doubles ===
(South Africa) Marius Barnard / (South Africa) John-Laffnie de Jager defeated (South Africa) David Adams / (Commonwealth of Independent States) Andrei Olhovskiy, 6–4, 3–6, 7–6

- It was Barnard's 1st overall. It was de Jager's 1st overall.
