= 1991 Kremlin Cup – Doubles =

Doubles
- 1991 Kremlin Cup

Final
- Champions: (Germany) Eric Jelen (Germany) Carl-Uwe Steeb
- Runners-up: (Soviet Union) Andrei Cherkasov (Soviet Union) Alexander Volkov
- Score: 6–4, 7–6

Details
- Draw: 16
- Seeds: 4

Events
Singles	Doubles
← 1990 ·	Kremlin Cup	· 1992 →

Hendrik Jan Davids and Paul Haarhuis were the defending champions, but Haarhuis did not participate this year. Davids partnered Ģirts Dzelde, losing in the first round.

Eric Jelen and Carl-Uwe Steeb won the title, defeating Andrei Cherkasov and Alexander Volkov 6–4, 7–6 in the final.

== Seeds ==
1. (Netherlands) Menno Oosting / (Soviet Union) Dimitri Poliakov (second round)
2. (Iran) Mansour Bahrami / (Germany) Udo Riglewski (first round)
3. (Czechoslovakia) Vojtěch Flégl / (Czechoslovakia) Daniel Vacek (second round)
4. n/a

== Draw ==
=== Key ===
- Q = Qualifier
- WC = Wild card
- LL = Lucky loser
- Alt = Alternate
- ITF = ITF entry
- PR = Protected ranking
- SR = Special ranking
- SE = Special exempt
- JE = Junior exempt
- JR = Junior Accelerator Programme entrant
- CO = College Accelerator Programme entrant
- NG = Next Gen Accelerator Program entrant
- w/o = Walkover
- r = Retired
- d = Defaulted

=== Draw ===
First round
1	(Netherlands) M Oosting (Soviet Union) D Poliakov	6	6
LL	(Soviet Union) A Rybalko (Soviet Union) S Skakun	4	4
(Netherlands) R Krajicek (Netherlands) J Siemerink	6	7	6
(Netherlands) HJ Davids (Latvia) Ģ Dzelde	7	6	4
3	(Czechoslovakia) V Flégl (Czechoslovakia) D Vacek	6	3	6
(South Africa) B Haygarth (United States) S Patridge	3	6	3
(Soviet Union) A Cherkasov (Soviet Union) A Volkov	4	6	7
Q	(Soviet Union) V Gabrichidze (Soviet Union) D Kacharava	6	3	5
(Czechoslovakia) B Stanković (Czechoslovakia) R Vogel	2	6	7
(Spain) MA Gorriz (Italy) D Nargiso	6	3	6
(Czechoslovakia) J Čihák (United States) J Sobel	6	6
LL	(Soviet Union) S Baranov (Soviet Union) T Beiko	4	3
WC	(Israel) A Mansdorf (Soviet Union) A Medvedev	6	6
(Sweden) P Henricsson (Sweden) O Jonsson	4	4
(Germany) E Jelen (Germany) C-U Steeb	6	7
2	(Iran) M Bahrami (Germany) U Riglewski	1	6

Quarterfinals
1	(Netherlands) M Oosting (Soviet Union) D Poliakov	3	4
(Netherlands) R Krajicek (Netherlands) J Siemerink	6	6
3	(Czechoslovakia) V Flégl (Czechoslovakia) D Vacek	3	4
(Soviet Union) A Cherkasov (Soviet Union) A Volkov	6	6
(Czechoslovakia) B Stanković (Czechoslovakia) R Vogel	4	3
(Czechoslovakia) J Čihák (United States) J Sobel	6	6
WC	(Israel) A Mansdorf (Soviet Union) A Medvedev	2	6
(Germany) E Jelen (Germany) C-U Steeb	6	7

Semifinals
(Netherlands) R Krajicek (Netherlands) J Siemerink	6	3
(Soviet Union) A Cherkasov (Soviet Union) A Volkov	7	6
(Czechoslovakia) J Čihák (United States) J Sobel	4	4
(Germany) E Jelen (Germany) C-U Steeb	6	6

Final
(Soviet Union) A Cherkasov (Soviet Union) A Volkov	4	6
(Germany) E Jelen (Germany) C-U Steeb	6	7
