= 1994 Kremlin Cup – Singles =

Singles
- 1994 Kremlin Cup

Final
- Champion: (Russia) Alexander Volkov
- Runner-up: (United States) Chuck Adams
- Score: 6–2, 6–4

Details
- Draw: 32 (4 Q / 2 WC )
- Seeds: 8

Events
Singles	Doubles
← 1993 ·	Kremlin Cup	· 1995 →

Marc Rosset was the defending champion, but lost to Chuck Adams in the semifinal.
Alexander Volkov won in the final 6–2, 6–4 against Chuck Adams.

== Seeds ==
1. (Spain) Sergi Bruguera (first round)
2. (United States) Todd Martin (second round)
3. (Russia) Yevgeny Kafelnikov (quarterfinals)
4. (South Africa) Wayne Ferreira (second round)
5. (Austria) Thomas Muster (first round)
6. (Switzerland) Marc Rosset (semifinals)
7. (Czech Republic) Petr Korda (quarterfinals)
8. (Italy) Andrea Gaudenzi (second round)

== Draw ==
=== Key ===
- Q = Qualifier
- WC = Wild card
- LL = Lucky loser
- Alt = Alternate
- SE = Special exempt
- PR = Protected ranking
- ITF = ITF entry
- JE = Junior exempt
- w/o = Walkover
- r = Retired
- d = Defaulted
- SR = Special ranking

=== Finals ===
Semifinals
(Netherlands) Jacco Eltingh	7^{8}	6^{6}	2
(Russia) Alexander Volkov	6^{6}	7^{8}	6
6	(Switzerland) Marc Rosset	6	3	4
(United States) Chuck Adams	4	6	6

Final
(Russia) Alexander Volkov	6	6
(United States) Chuck Adams	2	4

=== Top half ===
First round
1	(Spain) S Bruguera	6	5	4
(Slovakia) K Kučera	3	7	6
(Netherlands) J Eltingh	5	7^{7}	6
(Germany) J Renzenbrink	7	6^{5}	3
(Russia) A Chesnokov	4	7^{7}	5
Q	(Germany) A Mronz	6	6^{3}	7
WC	(Russia) A Olhovskiy	6^{3}	2
7	(Czech Republic) P Korda	7^{7}	6
4	(South Africa) W Ferreira	6	6
(United States) B Gilbert	4	4
(Russia) A Volkov	4	6	7^{7}
(Czech Republic) M Damm	6	3	6^{4}
(Germany) H Dreekmann	2	6	6
WC	(Russia) A Cherkasov	6	4	4
(Czech Republic) D Vacek	6	7
5	(Austria) T Muster	2	5

Second round
(Slovakia) K Kučera	4	6	6^{2}
(Netherlands) J Eltingh	6	3	7^{7}
Q	(Germany) A Mronz	6	5	3
7	(Czech Republic) P Korda	4	7	6
4	(South Africa) W Ferreira	6	3	4
(Russia) A Volkov	3	6	6
(Germany) H Dreekmann	7	2	1
(Czech Republic) D Vacek	5	6	6

Quarterfinals
(Netherlands) J Eltingh	7^{7}	6
7	(Czech Republic) P Korda	6^{1}	4
(Russia) A Volkov	w/o
(Czech Republic) D Vacek

Semifinals
(Netherlands) J Eltingh	7^{8}	6^{6}	2
(Russia) A Volkov	6^{6}	7^{8}	6

=== Bottom half ===
First round
6	(Switzerland) M Rosset	6	6
Q	(Czech Republic) R Vašek	4	4
(Czech Republic) D Rikl	6	3	6^{3}
(Germany) M Zoecke	4	6	7^{7}
(Netherlands) P Haarhuis	7	3	7
(Canada) G Rusedski	5	6	6
Q	(Germany) L Rehmann	6	2	1
3	(Russia) Y Kafelnikov	3	6	6
8	(Italy) A Gaudenzi	3	6	6
(Germany) B Karbacher	6	2	1
(Germany) K Braasch	6^{2}	5
Q	(Germany) C-U Steeb	7^{7}	7
(United States) C Adams	7^{7}	7
(Switzerland) J Hlasek	6^{4}	5
(Sweden) H Holm	6^{2}	6^{6}
2	(United States) T Martin	7^{7}	7^{8}

Second round
6	(Switzerland) M Rosset	6	6
(Germany) M Zoecke	4	2
(Netherlands) P Haarhuis	6	5	1
3	(Russia) Y Kafelnikov	4	7	6
8	(Italy) A Gaudenzi	2	3
Q	(Germany) C-U Steeb	6	6
(United States) C Adams	7^{7}	6
2	(United States) T Martin	6^{5}	3

Quarterfinals
6	(Switzerland) M Rosset	6^{12}	6	6
3	(Russia) Y Kafelnikov	7^{14}	4	3
Q	(Germany) C-U Steeb	6	5	3
(United States) C Adams	3	7	6

Semifinals
6	(Switzerland) M Rosset	6	3	4
(United States) C Adams	4	6	6
