= 1992 Kremlin Cup – Doubles =

Doubles
- 1992 Kremlin Cup

Final
- Champions: (South Africa) Marius Barnard (South Africa) John-Laffnie de Jager
- Runners-up: (South Africa) David Adams (Commonwealth of Independent States) Andrei Olhovskiy
- Score: 6–4, 3–6, 7–6

Details
- Draw: 16
- Seeds: 4

Events
Singles	Doubles
← 1991 ·	Kremlin Cup	· 1993 →

Eric Jelen and Carl-Uwe Steeb were the defending champions, but Jelen did not participate this year. Steeb partnered Patrik Kühnen, losing in the first round.

Marius Barnard and John-Laffnie de Jager won the title, defeating David Adams and Andrei Olhovskiy 6–4, 3–6, 7–6 in the final.

== Seeds ==
1. (United States) Jim Grabb / (United States) Richey Reneberg (second round)
2. (South Africa) David Adams / (Commonwealth of Independent States) Andrei Olhovskiy (final)
3. (Netherlands) Jacco Eltingh / (Netherlands) Jan Siemerink (second round, withdrew)
4. (Czechoslovakia) Vojtěch Flégl / (Czechoslovakia) Karel Nováček (first round)

== Draw ==
=== Key ===
- Q = Qualifier
- WC = Wild card
- LL = Lucky loser
- Alt = Alternate
- SE = Special exempt
- PR = Protected ranking
- ITF = ITF entry
- JE = Junior exempt
- w/o = Walkover
- r = Retired
- d = Defaulted
- SR = Special ranking

=== Draw ===
First round
1	(United States) J Grabb (United States) R Reneberg	7	3	7
Q	(Israel) G Bloom (Israel) M Daniel	5	6	6
(South Africa) M Barnard (South Africa) J-L de Jager	6	6
(Germany) P Kühnen (Germany) C-U Steeb	4	3
4	(Czechoslovakia) V Flégl (Czechoslovakia) K Nováček	6	7	3
(Commonwealth of Independent States) D Poliakov (Czechoslovakia) B Stanković	7	6	6
(South Africa) B Haygarth (Czechoslovakia) T Anzari	6	7
(United Kingdom) J Bates (South Africa) C van Rensburg	1	6
(Commonwealth of Independent States) V Gabrichidze (Commonwealth of Independent States) A Merinov	6	7
(Spain) MA Gorriz (Finland) O Rahnasto	3	5
WC	(United States) J Tarango (United States) D Wheaton	2	6	4
3	(Netherlands) J Eltingh (Netherlands) J Siemerink	6	3	6
WC	(Commonwealth of Independent States) A Cherkasov (Commonwealth of Independent States) A Medvedev	7	6
(Latvia) Ģ Dzelde (Netherlands) M Schapers	6	2
(Netherlands) M Oosting (Germany) U Riglewski	4	1
2	(South Africa) D Adams (Commonwealth of Independent States) A Olhovskiy	6	6

Quarterfinals
1	(United States) J Grabb (United States) R Reneberg	6	3	2
(South Africa) M Barnard (South Africa) J-L de Jager	1	6	6
(Commonwealth of Independent States) D Poliakov (Czechoslovakia) B Stanković	1	6
(South Africa) B Haygarth (Czechoslovakia) T Anzari	6	7
(Commonwealth of Independent States) V Gabrichidze (Commonwealth of Independent States) A Merinov	w/o
3	(Netherlands) J Eltingh (Netherlands) J Siemerink
WC	(Commonwealth of Independent States) A Cherkasov (Commonwealth of Independent States) A Medvedev	6	3
2	(South Africa) D Adams (Commonwealth of Independent States) A Olhovskiy	7	6

Semifinals
(South Africa) M Barnard (South Africa) J-L de Jager	6	6	7
(South Africa) B Haygarth (Czechoslovakia) T Anzari	7	0	6
(Commonwealth of Independent States) V Gabrichidze (Commonwealth of Independent States) A Merinov	7	2	1
2	(South Africa) D Adams (Commonwealth of Independent States) A Olhovskiy	6	6	6

Final
(South Africa) M Barnard (South Africa) J-L de Jager	6	3	7
2	(South Africa) D Adams (Commonwealth of Independent States) A Olhovskiy	4	6	6
