= 1994 Kremlin Cup – Doubles =

Doubles
- 1994 Kremlin Cup

Final
- Champions: (Netherlands) Jacco Eltingh (Netherlands) Paul Haarhuis
- Runners-up: (South Africa) David Adams (Russia) Andrei Olhovskiy
- Score: W/O

Details
- Draw: 16
- Seeds: 4

Events
Singles	Doubles
← 1993 ·	Kremlin Cup	· 1995 →

Jacco Eltingh and Paul Haarhuis were the defending champions and successfully defended their title after David Adams and Andrei Olhovskiy withdrew prior to the final.

== Seeds ==
1. (Netherlands) Jacco Eltingh / (Netherlands) Paul Haarhuis (champions)
2. (South Africa) David Adams / (Russia) Andrei Olhovskiy (final, withdrew)
3. (Russia) Yevgeny Kafelnikov / (Czech Republic) David Rikl (quarterfinals, withdrew)
4. (Czech Republic) Martin Damm / (Czech Republic) Daniel Vacek (quarterfinals, withdrew)

== Draw ==
=== Key ===
- Q = Qualifier
- WC = Wild card
- LL = Lucky loser
- Alt = Alternate
- SE = Special exempt
- PR = Protected ranking
- ITF = ITF entry
- JE = Junior exempt
- w/o = Walkover
- r = Retired
- d = Defaulted
- SR = Special ranking

=== Draw ===
First round
1	(Netherlands) J Eltingh (Netherlands) P Haarhuis	6	6	7
(South Africa) J-L de Jager (Australia) J Fitzgerald	7	4	6
Q	(United States) M Keil (Sweden) P Nyborg	4	7	3
(United States) K Kinnear (United States) B Pearce	6	6	6
3	(Russia) Y Kafelnikov (Czech Republic) D Rikl	7	7
(Italy) D Nargiso (Germany) U Riglewski	6	6
(South Africa) G Muller (South Africa) P Norval	4	7	7
(The Bahamas) M Knowles (United States) S Melville	6	6	5
WC	(Russia) A Chesnokov (Russia) A Merinov	1	6	4
(Sweden) H Holm (Germany) A Mronz	6	1	6
WC	(Russia) A Cherkasov (Russia) A Volkov	3	5
4	(Czech Republic) M Damm (Czech Republic) D Vacek	6	7
WC	(Switzerland) J Hlasek (Czech Republic) P Korda	7	6
(United States) M Bauer (Australia) D Macpherson	5	4
(United States) F Montana (United States) J Pugh	6	4
2	(South Africa) D Adams (Russia) A Olhovskiy	7	6

Quarterfinals
1	(Netherlands) J Eltingh (Netherlands) P Haarhuis	6	6
(United States) K Kinnear (United States) B Pearce	3	4
3	(Russia) Y Kafelnikov (Czech Republic) D Rikl
(South Africa) G Muller (South Africa) P Norval	w/o
(Sweden) H Holm (Germany) A Mronz	w/o
4	(Czech Republic) M Damm (Czech Republic) D Vacek
WC	(Switzerland) J Hlasek (Czech Republic) P Korda	3	7	6
2	(South Africa) D Adams (Russia) A Olhovskiy	6	6	7

Semifinals
1	(Netherlands) J Eltingh (Netherlands) P Haarhuis	6	6
(South Africa) G Muller (South Africa) P Norval	1	3
(Sweden) H Holm (Germany) A Mronz	6	4
2	(South Africa) D Adams (Russia) A Olhovskiy	7	6

Final
1	(Netherlands) J Eltingh (Netherlands) P Haarhuis	w/o
2	(South Africa) D Adams (Russia) A Olhovskiy
