= 1990 Kremlin Cup – Singles =

Singles
- 1990 Kremlin Cup

Final
- Champion: (Soviet Union) Andrei Cherkasov
- Runner-up: (United States) Tim Mayotte
- Score: 6–2, 6–1

Details
- Draw: 32 (4 Q / 3 WC )
- Seeds: 8

Events
Singles	Doubles
Kremlin Cup	· 1991 →

Andrei Cherkasov won in the final 6–2, 6–1, against Tim Mayotte and with this he became the first winner of the Kremlin Cup.

== Seeds ==
1. (Ecuador) Andrés Gómez (first round)
2. (Spain) Emilio Sánchez (quarterfinals)
3. (Sweden) Magnus Gustafsson (first round)
4. (United States) Richey Reneberg (second round)
5. (Soviet Union) Alexander Volkov (quarterfinals)
6. (Switzerland) Marc Rosset (second round)
7. (United States) David Wheaton (second round)
8. (Soviet Union) Andrei Cherkasov (champion)

== Draw ==
=== Key ===
- Q = Qualifier
- WC = Wild card
- LL = Lucky loser
- Alt = Alternate
- ITF = ITF entry
- PR = Protected ranking
- SR = Special ranking
- SE = Special exempt
- JE = Junior exempt
- JR = Junior Accelerator Programme entrant
- CO = College Accelerator Programme entrant
- NG = Next Gen Accelerator Program entrant
- w/o = Walkover
- r = Retired
- d = Defaulted

=== Finals ===
Semifinals
(Czechoslovakia) Petr Korda	6	6	3
(United States) Tim Mayotte	7	3	6
(Germany) Udo Riglewski	1	6
8	(Soviet Union) Andrei Cherkasov	6	7

Final
(United States) Tim Mayotte	2	1
8	(Soviet Union) Andrei Cherkasov	6	6

=== Top half ===
First round
1	(Ecuador) A Gómez	2	4
(Sweden) J Gunnarsson	6	6
(Czechoslovakia) P Korda	7	6
(Australia) W Masur	5	4
WC	(Sweden) A Järryd	6	6
(Germany) M Stich	2	0
(Germany) E Jelen	3	0
7	(United States) D Wheaton	6	6
3	(Sweden) M Gustafsson	6	6	5
(United States) T Mayotte	4	7	7
(Germany) P Kühnen	7	6
(United States) G Layendecker	6	1
WC	(Germany) A Mronz	6	6
(Czechoslovakia) M Šrejber	3	4
WC	(Soviet Union) A Medvedev	4	3
5	(Soviet Union) A Volkov	6	6

Second round
(Sweden) J Gunnarsson	1	7	2
(Czechoslovakia) P Korda	6	6	6
WC	(Sweden) A Järryd	6	7
7	(United States) D Wheaton	3	5
(United States) T Mayotte	6	7
(Germany) P Kühnen	3	6
WC	(Germany) A Mronz	2	6	4
5	(Soviet Union) A Volkov	6	3	6

Quarterfinals
(Czechoslovakia) P Korda	7	7
WC	(Sweden) A Järryd	5	6
(United States) T Mayotte	6	6
5	(Soviet Union) A Volkov	3	2

Semifinals
(Czechoslovakia) P Korda	6	6	3
(United States) T Mayotte	7	3	6

=== Bottom half ===
First round
6	(Switzerland) M Rosset	7	6
(Spain) J Sánchez	6	4
Q	(Spain) S Casal	4	7	7
Q	(Sweden) T Högstedt	6	5	6
(Germany) U Riglewski	7	6	6
(United States) B Shelton	6	7	2
Q	(Australia) J Fitzgerald	5	2
4	(United States) R Reneberg	7	6
8	(Soviet Union) A Cherkasov	6	6
(Israel) A Mansdorf	2	0
(Israel) G Bloom	7	6
Q	(Soviet Union) A Olhovskiy	5	2
(Finland) V Paloheimo	6	6
(Netherlands) P Haarhuis	2	4
(Spain) F Clavet	7	2	6
2	(Spain) E Sánchez	5	6	7

Second round
6	(Switzerland) M Rosset	4	3
Q	(Spain) S Casal	6	6
(Germany) U Riglewski	1	6	6
4	(United States) R Reneberg	6	3	2
8	(Soviet Union) A Cherkasov	6	6
(Israel) G Bloom	3	3
(Finland) V Paloheimo	6	5	2
2	(Spain) E Sánchez	2	7	6

Quarterfinals
Q	(Spain) S Casal	6	6	3
(Germany) U Riglewski	4	7	6
8	(Soviet Union) A Cherkasov	6	6
2	(Spain) E Sánchez	3	3

Semifinals
(Germany) U Riglewski	1	6
8	(Soviet Union) A Cherkasov	6	7
