= 1995 Kremlin Cup – Doubles =

Competition

Doubles
- 1995 Kremlin Cup

Final
- Champions: (Zimbabwe) Byron Black (United States) Jared Palmer
- Runners-up: (United States) Tommy Ho (New Zealand) Brett Steven
- Score: 6–4, 3–6, 6–3

Details
- Draw: 16
- Seeds: 4

Events
Singles	Doubles
← 1994 ·	Kremlin Cup	· 1996 →

Jacco Eltingh and Paul Haarhuis were the defending champions, but did not participate this year.

Byron Black and Jared Palmer won the title, defeating Tommy Ho and Brett Steven 6–4, 3–6, 6–3 in the final.

== Seeds ==
1. (Czech Republic) Cyril Suk / (Czech Republic) Daniel Vacek (semifinals)
2. (Zimbabwe) Byron Black / (United States) Jared Palmer (champions)
3. (United States) Rick Leach / (United States) Scott Melville (first round)
4. (United States) Alex O'Brien / (Australia) Sandon Stolle (first round)

== Draw ==
=== Key ===
- Q = Qualifier
- WC = Wild card
- LL = Lucky loser
- Alt = Alternate
- SE = Special exempt
- PR = Protected ranking
- ITF = ITF entry
- JE = Junior exempt
- w/o = Walkover
- r = Retired
- d = Defaulted
- SR = Special ranking

=== Draw ===
First round
1	(Czech Republic) C Suk (Czech Republic) D Vacek	6	3	6
WC	(Russia) A Olhovskiy (Russia) A Volkov	3	6	4
WC	(Russia) A Stoliarov (Russia) I Tchelychev	6	4	1
(South Africa) J-L de Jager (South Africa) G Muller	3	6	6
3	(United States) R Leach (United States) S Melville	6	6	3
(United States) T Ho (New Zealand) B Steven	7	3	6
(Netherlands) HJ Davids (South Africa) P Norval	6	7
WC	(Russia) A Chesnokov (Belarus) V Voltchkov	3	6
Q	(Zimbabwe) W Black (Japan) S Matsuoka	7	6
(Australia) S Draper (Australia) J Ireland	6	2
(Croatia) G Ivanišević (Switzerland) M Rosset	6	3	7
4	(United States) A O'Brien (Australia) S Stolle	3	6	5
(Germany) M-K Goellner (Germany) P Kühnen	4	6	7
(United States) L Jensen (United States) J Tarango	6	3	6
(United States) K Kinnear (Belgium) L Pimek	4	3
2	(Zimbabwe) B Black (United States) J Palmer	6	6

Quarterfinals
1	(Czech Republic) C Suk (Czech Republic) D Vacek	6	4	7
(South Africa) J-L de Jager (South Africa) G Muller	4	7	6
(United States) T Ho (New Zealand) B Steven	7	6
(Netherlands) HJ Davids (South Africa) P Norval	6	3
Q	(Zimbabwe) W Black (Japan) S Matsuoka	5	3
(Croatia) G Ivanišević (Switzerland) M Rosset	7	6
(Germany) M-K Goellner (Germany) P Kühnen
2	(Zimbabwe) B Black (United States) J Palmer	w/o

Semifinals
1	(Czech Republic) C Suk (Czech Republic) D Vacek	4	4
(United States) T Ho (New Zealand) B Steven	6	6
(Croatia) G Ivanišević (Switzerland) M Rosset	0^{r}
2	(Zimbabwe) B Black (United States) J Palmer	5

Final
(United States) T Ho (New Zealand) B Steven	4	6	3
2	(Zimbabwe) B Black (United States) J Palmer	6	3	6
