= 1992 Kremlin Cup – Singles =

Singles
- 1992 Kremlin Cup

Final
- Champion: (Switzerland) Marc Rosset
- Runner-up: (Germany) Carl-Uwe Steeb
- Score: 6–2, 6–2

Details
- Draw: 32 (4 Q / 3 WC )
- Seeds: 8

Events
Singles	Doubles
← 1991 ·	Kremlin Cup	· 1993 →

Andrei Cherkasov was the defending champion, but lost to Cédric Pioline in the quarterfinal.
Marc Rosset won in the final 6–2, 6–2 against Carl-Uwe Steeb.

== Seeds ==
1. (Czechoslovakia) Karel Nováček (quarterfinals)
2. n/a
3. (Commonwealth of Independent States) Andriy Medvedev (quarterfinals)
4. (Commonwealth of Independent States) Andrei Cherkasov (quarterfinals)
5. (Germany) Carl-Uwe Steeb (final)
6. (France) Cédric Pioline (semifinals)
7. (United States) Jeff Tarango (first round)
8. (Switzerland) Marc Rosset (champion)

== Draw ==
=== Key ===
- Q = Qualifier
- WC = Wild card
- LL = Lucky loser
- Alt = Alternate
- SE = Special exempt
- PR = Protected ranking
- ITF = ITF entry
- JE = Junior exempt
- w/o = Walkover
- r = Retired
- d = Defaulted
- SR = Special ranking

=== Finals ===
Semifinals
8	(Switzerland) Marc Rosset	7^{7}	6
6	(France) Cédric Pioline	6^{1}	1
5	(Germany) Carl-Uwe Steeb	7^{7}	6
(Switzerland) Jakob Hlasek	6^{3}	4

Final
8	(Switzerland) Marc Rosset	6	6
5	(Germany) Carl-Uwe Steeb	2	2

=== Top half ===
First round
1	(Czechoslovakia) K Nováček	6	6
(France) G Raoux	4	2
(Germany) M Zoecke	7	6
(United States) J Grabb	5	4
Q	(Commonwealth of Independent States) Y Kafelnikov	6	7^{7}
(Spain) MA Gorriz	4	6^{2}
(United Kingdom) J Bates	4	4
8	(Switzerland) M Rosset	6	6
4	(Commonwealth of Independent States) A Cherkasov	6	6
Q	(Commonwealth of Independent States) D Poliakov	3	4
WC	(United States) D Wheaton	6^{4}	6	6
(Sweden) L Jonsson	7^{7}	0	2
(United States) R Reneberg	6	6
Q	(Latvia) Ģ Dzelde	2	3
(Austria) A Antonitsch	2	4
6	(France) C Pioline	6	6

Second round
1	(Czechoslovakia) K Nováček	6	6
(Germany) M Zoecke	3	1
Q	(Commonwealth of Independent States) Y Kafelnikov	7^{7}	3	6^{5}
8	(Switzerland) M Rosset	6^{4}	6	7^{7}
4	(Commonwealth of Independent States) A Cherkasov	6	7^{7}
WC	(United States) D Wheaton	4	6^{2}
(United States) R Reneberg	6	0	6^{1}
6	(France) C Pioline	4	6	7^{7}

Quarterfinals
1	(Czechoslovakia) K Nováček	4	2
8	(Switzerland) M Rosset	6	6
4	(Commonwealth of Independent States) A Cherkasov	4	6^{4}
6	(France) C Pioline	6	7^{7}

Semifinals
8	(Switzerland) M Rosset	7^{7}	6
6	(France) C Pioline	6^{1}	1

=== Bottom half ===
First round
5	(Germany) C-U Steeb	6	6
(Denmark) K Carlsen	4	3
(Sweden) N Kulti	7^{7}	6^{3}	6
(Netherlands) J Eltingh	6^{3}	7^{7}	4
(South Africa) C van Rensburg	6	7
Q	(Sweden) M Stadling	4	5
(France) O Delaître	3	3
3	(Commonwealth of Independent States) A Medvedev	6	6
7	(United States) J Tarango	3	5
(Switzerland) J Hlasek	6	7
(Netherlands) M Schapers	7	2	7
(Germany) P Kühnen	5	6	5
(Netherlands) J Siemerink	4	7	6
WC	(Commonwealth of Independent States) A Olhovskiy	6	5	4
WC	(Israel) G Bloom	6	6
LL	(Commonwealth of Independent States) A Rybalko	2	4

Second round
5	(Germany) C-U Steeb	6	6
(Sweden) N Kulti	2	3
(South Africa) C van Rensburg	6^{3}	6	2
3	(Commonwealth of Independent States) A Medvedev	7^{7}	0	6
(Switzerland) J Hlasek	6^{5}	7	6
(Netherlands) M Schapers	7^{7}	5	3
(Netherlands) J Siemerink	6	3	4
WC	(Israel) G Bloom	3	6	6

Quarterfinals
5	(Germany) C-U Steeb	6	6^{3}	6
3	(Commonwealth of Independent States) A Medvedev	4	7^{7}	3
(Switzerland) J Hlasek	6	6
WC	(Israel) G Bloom	1	2

Semifinals
5	(Germany) C-U Steeb	7^{7}	6
(Switzerland) J Hlasek	6^{3}	4
