= 1991 Muratti Time Indoor – Doubles =

Doubles
- 1991 Muratti Time Indoor

Final
- Champions: (Italy) Omar Camporese (Socialist Federal Republic of Yugoslavia) Goran Ivanišević
- Runners-up: (Netherlands) Tom Nijssen (Czechoslovakia) Cyril Suk
- Score: 6–4, 7–6

Details
- Draw: 16 (1WC/1Q)
- Seeds: 4

Events
| Singles | Doubles |
- Milan Indoor

Omar Camporese and Diego Nargiso were the defending champions, but faced each other this year with different partners. Camporese (partnering Goran Ivanišević) defeated Nargiso (partnering Stefano Pescosolido) in the first round.

Camporese and Ivanišević ended up winning the title by defeating Tom Nijssen and Cyril Suk 6–4, 7–6 in the final.

== Seeds ==
1. (Switzerland) Jakob Hlasek / (Mexico) Jorge Lozano (quarterfinals)
2. (United States) Patrick Galbraith / (Netherlands) Todd Witsken (semifinals)
3. (Italy) Omar Camporese / (Socialist Federal Republic of Yugoslavia) Goran Ivanišević (champions)
4. (Sweden) Anders Järryd / (Netherlands) Mark Koevermans (quarterfinals)

== Draw ==
Key

- Q = Qualifier
- WC = Wild card
- LL = Lucky loser
- Alt = Alternate
- ITF = ITF entry
- PR = Protected ranking
- SR = Special ranking
- SE = Special exempt
- JE = Junior exempt
- JR = Junior Accelerator Programme entrant
- CO = College Accelerator Programme entrant
- NG = Next Gen Accelerator Program entrant
- w/o = Walkover
- r = Retired
- d = Defaulted

=== Draw ===
First round
1 | (Switzerland) J Hlasek (Mexico) J Lozano | 6 | 6
(Czechoslovakia) V Flégl (Czechoslovakia) D Vacek | 4 | 2
(Czechoslovakia) K Nováček (Czechoslovakia) T Šmíd | 7 | 3 | 7
WC | (Soviet Union) A Cherkasov (Soviet Union) A Volkov | 5 | 6 | 5
3 | (Italy) O Camporese (Socialist Federal Republic of Yugoslavia) G Ivanišević | 7 | 7
(Italy) D Nargiso (Italy) S Pescosolido | 6 | 6
(Czechoslovakia) I Lendl (South Africa) C van Rensburg | 6 | 3 | 6
(United States) S DeVries (Australia) D Macpherson | 4 | 6 | 3
(Sweden) J Gunnarsson (Sweden) P Lundgren | 3 | 4
(Netherlands) T Nijssen (Czechoslovakia) C Suk | 6 | 6
(Iran) M Bahrami (Denmark) M Mortensen | 3 | 3
4 | (Netherlands) M Koevermans (Sweden) A Järryd | 6 | 6
Q | (Netherlands) R Krajicek (Germany) C Saceanu | 3
(Italy) N Bruno (Italy) S Colombo | 0^{r}
(United States) C Beckman (United States) L Jensen | 6 | 3 | 3
2 | (United States) P Galbraith (United States) T Witsken | 4 | 6 | 6

Quarterfinals
1 | (Switzerland) J Hlasek (Mexico) J Lozano | 3 | 3
(Czechoslovakia) K Nováček (Czechoslovakia) T Šmíd | 6 | 6
3 | (Italy) O Camporese (Socialist Federal Republic of Yugoslavia) G Ivanišević | w/o
(Czechoslovakia) I Lendl (South Africa) C van Rensburg
(Netherlands) T Nijssen (Czechoslovakia) C Suk | 6 | 6 | 6
4 | (Netherlands) M Koevermans (Sweden) A Järryd | 7 | 2 | 2
Q | (Netherlands) R Krajicek (Germany) C Saceanu | 4 | 5
2 | (United States) P Galbraith (United States) T Witsken | 6 | 7

Semifinals
(Czechoslovakia) K Nováček (Czechoslovakia) T Šmíd | 6 | 5
3 | (Italy) O Camporese (Socialist Federal Republic of Yugoslavia) G Ivanišević | 7 | 6
(Netherlands) T Nijssen (Czechoslovakia) C Suk | 6 | 6
2 | (United States) P Galbraith (United States) T Witsken | 3 | 4

Final
3 | (Italy) O Camporese (Socialist Federal Republic of Yugoslavia) G Ivanišević | 6 | 7
(Netherlands) T Nijssen (Czechoslovakia) C Suk | 4 | 6
