= 1995 Kremlin Cup – Singles =

Singles
- 1995 Kremlin Cup

Final
- Champion: (Germany) Carl-Uwe Steeb
- Runner-up: (Czech Republic) Daniel Vacek
- Score: 7–6^{(7–5)}, 3–6, 7–6^{(8–6)}

Details
- Draw: 32 (4 Q / 2 WC )
- Seeds: 8

Events
Singles	Doubles
← 1994 ·	Kremlin Cup	· 1996 →

Alexander Volkov was the defending champion, but lost to Daniel Vacek in the quarterfinal.
Carl-Uwe Steeb won in the final 7–6^{(7–5)}, 3–6, 7–6^{(8–6)} against Daniel Vacek.

== Seeds ==
1. (Russia) Yevgeny Kafelnikov (semifinals)
2. (Croatia) Goran Ivanišević (first round)
3. (Switzerland) Marc Rosset (semifinals)
4. n/a
5. (Netherlands) Jan Siemerink (first round)
6. (Russia) Alexander Volkov (quarterfinals)
7. (Italy) Renzo Furlan (first round)
8. (Zimbabwe) Byron Black (quarterfinals)

== Draw ==
=== Key ===
- Q = Qualifier
- WC = Wild card
- LL = Lucky loser
- Alt = Alternate
- ITF = ITF entry
- PR = Protected ranking
- SR = Special ranking
- SE = Special exempt
- JE = Junior exempt
- JR = Junior Accelerator Programme entrant
- CO = College Accelerator Programme entrant
- NG = Next Gen Accelerator Program entrant
- w/o = Walkover
- r = Retired
- d = Defaulted

=== Finals ===
Semifinals
1	(Russia) Yevgeny Kafelnikov	6^{8}	6	6^{5}
(Czech Republic) Daniel Vacek	7^{10}	3	7^{7}
3	(Switzerland) Marc Rosset	1	6^{7}
(Germany) Carl-Uwe Steeb	6	7^{9}

Final
(Czech Republic) Daniel Vacek	6^{5}	6	6^{6}
(Germany) Carl-Uwe Steeb	7^{7}	3	7^{8}

=== Top half ===
First round
1	(Russia) Y Kafelnikov	6	7
(Denmark) F Fetterlein	3	5
(New Zealand) B Steven	2	3
(France) C Pioline	6	6
Q	(Netherlands) HJ Davids	4	3
(Switzerland) J Hlasek	6	6
WC	(Belarus) V Voltchkov	3	2
8	(Zimbabwe) B Black	6	6
LL	(United States) T Ho	5	6^{3}
(Russia) A Chesnokov	7	7^{7}
(Romania) A Voinea	2	0
(Czech Republic) D Vacek	6	6
(United States) M Joyce	3	6^{4}
Q	(Netherlands) S Groen	6	7^{7}
(France) L Roux	6	6^{3}	0
6	(Russia) A Volkov	4	7^{7}	6

Second round
1	(Russia) Y Kafelnikov	7	6
(France) C Pioline	5	1
(Switzerland) J Hlasek	6	3	4
8	(Zimbabwe) B Black	3	6	6
(Russia) A Chesnokov	6^{5}	4
(Czech Republic) D Vacek	7^{7}	6
Q	(Netherlands) S Groen	7	2	3
6	(Russia) A Volkov	5	6	6

Quarterfinals
1	(Russia) Y Kafelnikov	6^{2}	6	6
8	(Zimbabwe) B Black	7^{7}	0	0
(Czech Republic) D Vacek	6	6
6	(Russia) A Volkov	2	3

Semifinals
1	(Russia) Y Kafelnikov	6^{8}	6	6^{5}
(Czech Republic) D Vacek	7^{10}	3	7^{7}

=== Bottom half ===
First round
5	(Netherlands) J Siemerink	6	5	5
(Slovakia) K Kučera	4	7	7
(Australia) S Draper	6	7^{7}
Q	(Zimbabwe) W Black	1	6^{4}
Q	(Slovakia) J Krošlák	6	6
(United States) A Krickstein	1	2
(United States) J Tarango	6^{5}	6^{2}
3	(Switzerland) M Rosset	7^{7}	7^{7}
7	(Italy) R Furlan	6^{3}	3
WC	(Russia) A Olhovskiy	7^{7}	6
(United States) J Palmer	3	4
(Germany) M-K Goellner	6	6
(Germany) M Sinner	6	6^{3}	6^{3}
(Germany) C-U Steeb	3	7^{7}	7^{7}
(Japan) S Matsuoka	7^{7}	6
2	(Croatia) G Ivanišević	6^{5}	4

Second round
(Slovakia) K Kučera	1	6^{3}
(Australia) S Draper	6	7^{7}
Q	(Slovakia) J Krošlák	4	3
3	(Switzerland) M Rosset	6	6
WC	(Russia) A Olhovskiy	6	6^{8}	7^{7}
(Germany) M-K Goellner	4	7^{10}	6^{5}
(Germany) C-U Steeb	6	6^{4}	6
(Japan) S Matsuoka	2	7^{7}	3

Quarterfinals
(Australia) S Draper	4	2
3	(Switzerland) M Rosset	6	6
WC	(Russia) A Olhovskiy	1	6^{7}
(Germany) C-U Steeb	6	7^{9}

Semifinals
3	(Switzerland) M Rosset	5	7	4
(Germany) C-U Steeb	7	5	6
