= 1994 Kremlin Cup =

- Date: 7–13 November
- Edition: 5th
- Category: World Series
- Draw: 32S / 16D
- Prize money: $1,100,000
- Surface: Carpet / indoor
- Location: Moscow, Russia
- Venue: Olympic Stadium

Champions

Singles
- (Russia) Alexander Volkov

Doubles
- (Netherlands) Jacco Eltingh / (Netherlands) Paul Haarhuis
← 1993 ·	Kremlin Cup	· 1995 →

The 1994 Kremlin Cup was a men's tennis tournament played on indoor carpet courts. It was the fifth edition of the Kremlin Cup, and was part of the World Series of the 1994 ATP Tour. It took place at the Olympic Stadium in Moscow, Russia, from 7 November through 13 November 1994. Unseeded Alexander Volkov won the singles title.

== Finals ==
=== Singles ===
(Russia) Alexander Volkov defeated (United States) Chuck Adams, 6–2, 6–4

- It was Volkov's 1st singles title of the year and the 3rd and last of his career.

=== Doubles ===
(Netherlands) Jacco Eltingh / (Netherlands) Paul Haarhuis defeated (South Africa) David Adams / (Russia) Andrei Olhovskiy, W/O

- It was Eltingh's 8th title of the year and 20th title overall. It was Haarhuis's 8th title of the year and 21st title overall.
