= 1995 Kremlin Cup =

- Date: 6–12 November
- Edition: 6th
- Category: World Series
- Draw: 32S / 16D
- Prize money: $1,125,000
- Surface: Carpet / indoor
- Location: Moscow, Russia
- Venue: Olympic Stadium

Champions

Singles
- (Germany) Carl-Uwe Steeb

Doubles
- (Zimbabwe) Byron Black / (United States) Jared Palmer
← 1994 ·	Kremlin Cup	· 1996 →

The 1995 Kremlin Cup was a men's tennis tournament played on indoor carpet courts. It was the 6th edition of the Kremlin Cup, and was part of the World Series of the 1995 ATP Tour. It took place at the Olympic Stadium in Moscow, Russia, from 6 November through 12 November 1995. Unseeded Carl-Uwe Steeb won the singles title.

== Finals ==
=== Singles ===
(Germany) Carl-Uwe Steeb defeated (Czech Republic) Daniel Vacek, 7–6^{(7–5)}, 3–6, 7–6^{(8–6)}

- It was Steeb's 1st singles title of the year and 3rd and last of his career.

=== Doubles ===
(Zimbabwe) Byron Black / (United States) Jared Palmer defeated (United States) Tommy Ho / (New Zealand) Brett Steven, 6–4, 3–6, 6–3

- It was Black's 2nd title of the year and 11th title overall. It was Palmers's 4th title of the year and 10th title overall.
