= 1993 Kremlin Cup – Doubles =

Doubles
- 1993 Kremlin Cup

Final
- Champions: (Netherlands) Jacco Eltingh (Netherlands) Paul Haarhuis
- Runners-up: (Sweden) Jan Apell (Sweden) Jonas Björkman
- Score: 6–1, ret.

Details
- Draw: 16
- Seeds: 4

Events
Singles	Doubles
← 1992 ·	Kremlin Cup	· 1994 →

Marius Barnard and John-Laffnie de Jager were the defending champions, but Barnard did not participate this year. de Jager partnered Johan de Beer, losing in the first round.

Jacco Eltingh and Paul Haarhuis won the title, defeating Jan Apell and Jonas Björkman by retirement after winning 6–1 in the first set.

== Seeds ==
1. (Netherlands) Jacco Eltingh / (Netherlands) Paul Haarhuis (champions)
2. (Zimbabwe) Byron Black / (United States) Jonathan Stark (first round)
3. (South Africa) David Adams / (Russia) Andrei Olhovskiy (semifinals)
4. (Germany) Patrik Kühnen / (Netherlands) Menno Oosting (quarterfinals)

== Draw ==
=== Key ===
- Q = Qualifier
- WC = Wild card
- LL = Lucky loser
- Alt = Alternate
- SE = Special exempt
- PR = Protected ranking
- ITF = ITF entry
- JE = Junior exempt
- w/o = Walkover
- r = Retired
- d = Defaulted
- SR = Special ranking

=== Draw ===
First round
1	(Netherlands) J Eltingh (Netherlands) P Haarhuis	6	5	6
(South Africa) J de Beer (South Africa) J-L de Jager	1	7	4
(Czech Republic) M Damm (Czech Republic) D Vacek	4	4
(Netherlands) S Groen (Germany) D Prinosil	6	6
4	(Germany) P Kühnen (Netherlands) M Oosting	7	6
Q	(South Africa) E Ferreira (United States) J Tarango	6	4
(United States) M Briggs (United States) T Kronemann	6	7
(United States) D Eisenman (The Bahamas) M Knowles	1	6
(United States) K Kinnear (South Africa) C van Rensburg	7	6
(Italy) D Nargiso (Venezuela) N Pereira	6	3
WC	(Switzerland) J Hlasek (Russia) Y Kafelnikov	6	4	5
3	(South Africa) D Adams (Russia) A Olhovskiy	4	6	7
WC	(Sweden) B Borg (Russia) A Cherkasov	2	2
(Norway) B-O Pedersen (United States) J Palmer	6	6
(Sweden) J Apell (Sweden) J Björkman	6	6
2	(Zimbabwe) B Black (United States) J Stark	4	2

Quarterfinals
1	(Netherlands) J Eltingh (Netherlands) P Haarhuis	6	6
(Netherlands) S Groen (Germany) D Prinosil	3	4
4	(Germany) P Kühnen (Netherlands) M Oosting	2	7	4
(United States) M Briggs (United States) T Kronemann	6	6	6
(United States) K Kinnear (South Africa) C van Rensburg	6	5
3	(South Africa) D Adams (Russia) A Olhovskiy	7	7
(Norway) B-O Pedersen (United States) J Palmer	3	3
(Sweden) J Apell (Sweden) J Björkman	6	6

Semifinals
1	(Netherlands) J Eltingh (Netherlands) P Haarhuis	7	2
(United States) M Briggs (United States) T Kronemann	6	1^{r}
3	(South Africa) D Adams (Russia) A Olhovskiy	6	3
(Sweden) J Apell (Sweden) J Björkman	7	6

Final
1	(Netherlands) J Eltingh (Netherlands) P Haarhuis	6
(Sweden) J Apell (Sweden) J Björkman	1	r
