= 1993 Kremlin Cup =

- Date: 8–14 November
- Edition: 4th
- Category: World Series
- Draw: 32S / 16D
- Prize money: $325,000
- Surface: Carpet / indoor
- Location: Moscow, Russia
- Venue: Olympic Stadium

Champions

Singles
- (Switzerland) Marc Rosset

Doubles
- (Netherlands) Jacco Eltingh / (Netherlands) Paul Haarhuis
← 1992 ·	Kremlin Cup	· 1994 →

The 1993 Kremlin Cup was a tennis tournament played on indoor carpet courts. It was the 4th edition of the Kremlin Cup, and was part of the World Series of the 1993 ATP Tour. It took place at the Olympic Stadium in Moscow, Russia, from 8 November through 14 November 1993.

== Finals ==
=== Singles ===
(Switzerland) Marc Rosset defeated (Germany) Patrik Kühnen, 6–4, 6–3

- It was Rosset's 3rd singles title of the year and 7th title overall.

=== Doubles ===
(Netherlands) Jacco Eltingh / (Netherlands) Paul Haarhuis defeated (Sweden) Jan Apell / (Sweden) Jonas Björkman, 6–1, ret

- It was Eltingh's 6th title of the year and 11th title overall. It was Haarhuis's 6th title of the year and 12th title overall.
