= Serge Soulié =

French tennis player

- Country (sports): France
- Born: 23 June 1969 (age 55)
- Prize money: $36,307

Singles
- Career record: 0–1
- Highest ranking: No. 244 (20 Jul 1992)

Grand Slam singles results
- Australian Open: Q1 (1989)
- French Open: Q1 (1993)

Doubles
- Highest ranking: No. 399 (8 Feb 1993)

Grand Slam mixed doubles results
- French Open: 1R (1991)

Serge Soulié (born 23 June 1969) is a French former professional tennis player.

Soulié, who reached a best singles world ranking of 244, was active on the ATP Challenger Tour in the late 1980s and early 1990s. He made an ATP Tour main draw appearance at the 1991 Kremlin Cup, where he lost in the first round to Marc Rosset. At the 1991 French Open he partnered Noëlle van Lottum in the mixed doubles event.
