= Alexander Shvets =

Belarusian tennis player

- Full name: Alexander Shvets
- Country (sports): Belarus
- Born: 29 June 1972 (age 52); Minsk, Belarus
- Plays: Right-handed
- Prize money: $83,446

Singles
- Career record: 9–9
- Career titles: 0; 0 Challenger, 5 Futures
- Highest ranking: No. 195 (10 July 2000)

Grand Slam singles results
- Australian Open: Q1 (2000)
- French Open: Q1 (2000)
- Wimbledon: Q2 (1998, 2000)
- US Open: Q1 (2000)

Doubles
- Career record: 1–5
- Career titles: 0; 0 Challenger, 3 Futures
- Highest ranking: No. 405 (8 October 2001)
- Last updated on: 24 February 2023.

Alexander Shvets (born 29 June 1972) is a former professional tennis player from Belarus. He is also known as Alexander Shvec.

== Biography ==
Shvets, a right-handed player from Minsk, represented Belarus in a total of 19 Davis Cup ties, the first in 1994. In a World Group qualifying tie against Switzerland in 2000 he suffered the ignominy of being beaten 0–6, 0–6 by Michel Kratochvil. He finally got an opportunity to play in the World Group in 2004, his final year of Davis Cup tennis. A veteran of the team at 31, Shvets featured in the doubles rubber of Belarus's opening fixture against Russia at home in Minsk. He and partner Max Mirnyi were beaten by Marat Safin and Mikhail Youzhny, but Belarus went on to win the tie and ultimately make the semi-finals, although Shvets took no further part in their campaign. He finished his career with a 13/13 overall record, 11/9 in singles.

On the ATP Tour, Shvets appeared in the main draw of three singles tournament, the 1996 St. Petersburg Open, the 1999 President's Cup in Tashkent and the 2002 St. Petersburg Open. He was runner-up at the Bukhara Challenger in 2000 and also made two doubles finals at Challenger level.

== ATP Challenger and ITF Futures finals ==
=== Singles: 7 (5–2) ===
Legend ATP Challenger (0–1) ITF Futures (5–1)	Finals by surface Hard (5–1) Clay (0–1) Grass (0–0) Carpet (0–0)

Result	W–L	Date	Tournament	Tier	Surface	Opponent	Score
Win	1–0	Oct 1999	Uzbekistan F3, Guliston	Futures	Hard	(Uzbekistan) Dmitriy Tomashevich	6–2, 6–4
Win	2–0	Oct 1999	Uzbekistan F4, Fargana	Futures	Hard	(Israel) Lior Dahan	6–2, 6–0
Win	3–0	Oct 1999	Uzbekistan F5, Karshi	Futures	Hard	(Italy) Stefano Galvani	6–4, 3–6, 6–3
Win	4–0	Oct 2000	Uzbekistan F3, Guliston	Futures	Hard	(Slovakia) Michal Mertinak	6–7^{(10–12)}, 6–1, 6–4
Loss	4–1	Oct 2000	Bukhara, Uzbekistan	Challenger	Hard	(Israel) Noam Behr	6–4, 6–7^{(3–7)}, 0–6
Loss	4–2	Aug 2001	Russia F2, Saransk	Futures	Clay	(Ukraine) Orest Tereshchuk	1–6, 5–7
Win	5–2	Oct 2001	Uzbekistan F3, Karshi	Futures	Hard	(Kazakhstan) Alexey Kedryuk	6–3, 6–1

=== Doubles: 5 (2–3) ===
Legend ATP Challenger (0–2) ITF Futures (2–1)	Finals by surface Hard (1–2) Clay (1–1) Grass (0–0) Carpet (0–0)

Result	W–L	Date	Tournament	Tier	Surface	Partner	Opponents	Score
Loss	0–1	Aug 1998	Sopot, Poland	Challenger	Clay	(Bulgaria) Milen Velev	(New Zealand) James Greenhalgh (Serbia) Nenad Zimonjic	1–6, 3–6
Win	1–1	Oct 1999	Uzbekistan F3, Guliston	Futures	Hard	(Uzbekistan) Dmitriy Tomashevich	(Turkey) Erhan Oral (Turkey) Efe Ustundag	6–3, 6–1
Win	2–1	Aug 2001	Russia F2, Saransk	Futures	Clay	(Ukraine) Orest Tereshchuk	(Russia) Alexander Sikanov (Ukraine) Aleksandr Yarmola	6–2, 7–5
Loss	2–2	Oct 2001	Bukhara, Uzbekistan	Challenger	Hard	(Kazakhstan) Alexey Kedryuk	(Pakistan) Aisam Qureshi (Netherlands) Rogier Wassen	2–6, 4–6
Loss	2–3	Oct 2001	Uzbekistan F3, Karshi	Futures	Hard	(Kazakhstan) Alexey Kedryuk	(Russia) Kirill Ivanov-Smolenskii (Uzbekistan) Dmitriy Tomashevich	4–6, 7–5, 3–6

== See also ==
- List of Belarus Davis Cup team representatives
