= 1991 Muratti Time Indoor =

Tennis tournament

- Date: 4–10 February
- Edition: 14th
- Category: ATP World Series (Free Week)
- Draw: 32S / 16D
- Prize money: $540,000
- Surface: Carpet / indoor
- Location: Milan, Italy
- Venue: Assago Forum

Champions

Singles
- (Soviet Union) Alexander Volkov

Doubles
- (Italy) Omar Camporese / (Socialist Federal Republic of Yugoslavia) Goran Ivanišević
- Milan Indoor

The 1991 Muratti Time Indoor was a men's tennis tournament played on indoor carpet courts at the recently opened Assago Forum in Milan, Italy. It was the 14th edition of the tournament, and was part of the ATP World Series of the 1991 ATP Tour. It took place from 4 February until 10 February 1991 and eighth-seeded Alexander Volkov won the singles title.

== Finals ==
=== Singles ===
(Soviet Union) Alexander Volkov defeated (Italy) Cristiano Caratti, 6–1, 7–5

- It was Volkov's first singles title of his career.

=== Doubles ===
(Italy) Omar Camporese / (Socialist Federal Republic of Yugoslavia) Goran Ivanišević defeated (Netherlands) Tom Nijssen / (Czechoslovakia) Cyril Suk, 6–4, 7–6
