= 1990 Kremlin Cup – Doubles =

Doubles
- 1990 Kremlin Cup

Final
- Champions: (Netherlands) Hendrik Jan Davids (Netherlands) Paul Haarhuis
- Runners-up: (Australia) John Fitzgerald (Sweden) Anders Järryd
- Score: 6–4, 7–6

Details
- Draw: 16
- Seeds: 4

Events
Singles	Doubles
Kremlin Cup	· 1991 →

In this first edition of the annual Kremlin Cup tennis competition, the doubles category winners were H. J. Davids and P. Haarhuis with winning scores of 6-4 and 7–6. This team became the first winner of the Kremlin Cup for doubles.

== Seeds ==
1. (Spain) Sergio Casal / (Spain) Emilio Sánchez (semifinals)
2. (France) Gilles Bastié / (Finland) Veli Paloheimo (first round)
3. (Australia) John Fitzgerald / (Sweden) Anders Järryd (final)
4. (Czechoslovakia) Petr Korda / (Czechoslovakia) Cyril Suk (semifinals)

== Draw ==
=== Key ===
- Q = Qualifier
- WC = Wild card
- LL = Lucky loser
- Alt = Alternate
- SE = Special exempt
- PR = Protected ranking
- ITF = ITF entry
- JE = Junior exempt
- w/o = Walkover
- r = Retired
- d = Defaulted
- SR = Special ranking

=== Draw ===
First round
1	(Spain) S Casal (Spain) E Sánchez	6	6
LL	(Soviet Union) Ģ Dzelde (Soviet Union) A Olhovskiy	3	2
WC	(Israel) G Bloom (United States) A Hombrecher	6	2	6
(Czechoslovakia) V Flégl (Czechoslovakia) D Vacek	4	6	7
3	(Australia) J Fitzgerald (Sweden) A Järryd	6	6
(United States) S Salumaa (United States) R Van't Hof	2	3
(Iran) M Bahrami (Spain) J Sánchez	6	6
(Czechoslovakia) J Čihák (Czechoslovakia) B Stanković	3	4
Q	(Czechoslovakia) M Damm (Czechoslovakia) M Šrejber	7	1	6
(Sweden) R Båthman (United States) B Shelton	6	6	2
(United States) C Beckman (United States) L Jensen	2	5
4	(Czechoslovakia) P Korda (Czechoslovakia) C Suk	6	7
(Netherlands) HJ Davids (Netherlands) P Haarhuis	7	6	7
(Germany) E Jelen (Germany) A Mronz	6	7	6
(Spain) F Clavet (Sweden) J Gunnarsson	6	1	6
2	(France) G Bastié (Finland) V Paloheimo	4	6	2

Quarterfinals
1	(Spain) S Casal (Spain) E Sánchez	7	6
(Czechoslovakia) V Flégl (Czechoslovakia) D Vacek	6	4
3	(Australia) J Fitzgerald (Sweden) A Järryd	6	6
(Iran) M Bahrami (Spain) J Sánchez	3	2
Q	(Czechoslovakia) M Damm (Czechoslovakia) M Šrejber	4	6	4
4	(Czechoslovakia) P Korda (Czechoslovakia) C Suk	6	1	6
(Netherlands) HJ Davids (Netherlands) P Haarhuis	6	6
(Spain) F Clavet (Sweden) J Gunnarsson	4	2

Semifinals
1	(Spain) S Casal (Spain) E Sánchez	4	6
3	(Australia) J Fitzgerald (Sweden) A Järryd	6	7
4	(Czechoslovakia) P Korda (Czechoslovakia) C Suk	4	6
(Netherlands) HJ Davids (Netherlands) P Haarhuis	6	7

Final
3	(Australia) J Fitzgerald (Sweden) A Järryd	4	6
(Netherlands) HJ Davids (Netherlands) P Haarhuis	6	7
