= 1991 Kremlin Cup =

- Date: 4–10 November
- Edition: 2nd
- Category: World Series
- Draw: 32S / 16D
- Prize money: $297,000
- Surface: Carpet / indoor
- Location: Moscow, Soviet Union
- Venue: Olympic Stadium

Champions

Singles
- (Soviet Union) Andrei Cherkasov

Doubles
- (Germany) Eric Jelen / (Germany) Carl-Uwe Steeb
- Kremlin Cup

The 1991 Kremlin Cup was a men's tennis tournament played on indoor carpet courts. It was the 2nd edition of the Kremlin Cup, and was part of the World Series of the 1991 ATP Tour. It took place at the Olympic Stadium in Moscow, Soviet Union, from 4 November through 10 November 1991. Fourth-seeded Andrei Cherkasov won the singles title.

== Finals ==
=== Singles ===
(Soviet Union) Andrei Cherkasov defeated (Switzerland) Jakob Hlasek, 7–6^{(7–2)}, 3–6, 7–6^{(7–5)}

- It was Cherkasov's 1st singles title of the year and the 2nd and last of his career.

=== Doubles ===
(Germany) Eric Jelen / (Germany) Carl-Uwe Steeb defeated (Soviet Union) Andrei Cherkasov / (Soviet Union) Alexander Volkov, 6–4, 7–6

- It was Jelen's 2nd title of the year, and his 5th overall. It was Steeb's 2nd title of the year, and his 3rd overall.
