= List of Belarus Davis Cup team representatives =

This is a list of tennis players who have represented the Belarus Davis Cup team in an official Davis Cup match. Belarus have taken part in the competition since 1994. Previously, Belarusians were members of the Soviet Union Davis Cup team. Belarus was suspended in 2022, due to the 2022 Russian invasion of Ukraine.

== Players ==
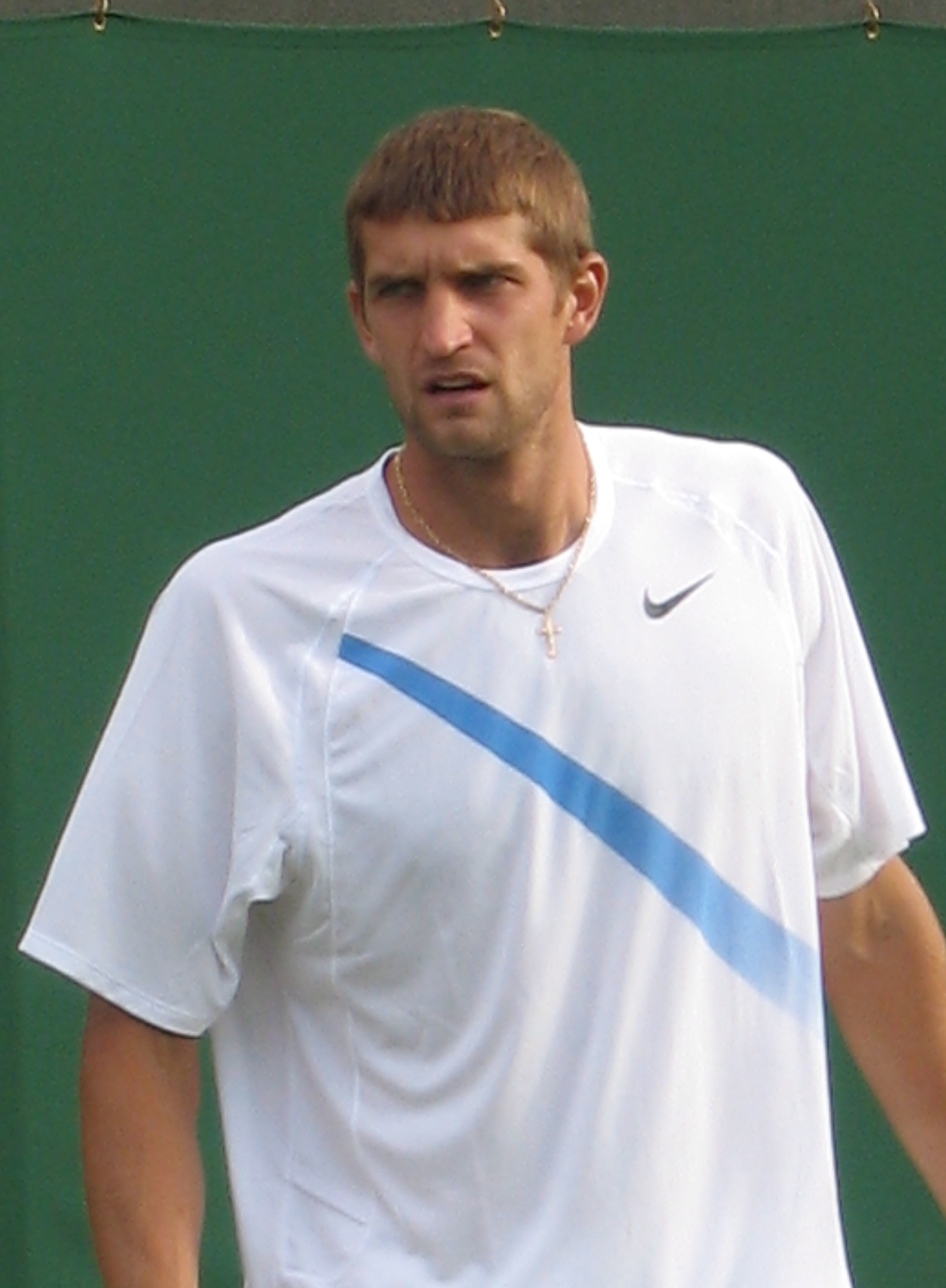
Max Mirnyi

Player	W-L (Total)	W-L (Singles)	W-L (Doubles)	Ties	Debut
Sergey Betov	3–8	0–6	3–2	8	2008
Aliaksandr Bury	8–5	2–1	6–4	11	2009
Egor Gerasimov	11–4	10–3	1–1	8	2013
Uladzimir Ignatik	16–16	13–15	3–1	16	2008
Ilya Ivashka	4–0	4–0	0–0	3	2016
Andrei Karatchenia	2–4	2–3	0–1	5	2004
Pavel Katliarov	0–2	0–1	0–1	1	2008
Vasilly Kazhera	0–1	0–1	0–0	1	2000
Evgeni Mikheev	1–3	1–3	0–0	3	1995
Max Mirnyi	57–33	24–18	33–15	52	1994
Sergei Samoseiko	0–2	0–1	0–1	2	1999
Alexander Shvets	13–13	11–9	2–4	19	1994
Yaraslav Shyla	2–1	2–1	0–0	2	2016
Sergei Skakun	6–0	3–0	3–0	4	1994
Alexander Skrypko	1–6	1–6	0–0	7	2001
Serguei Tarasevitch	0–2	0–2	0–0	2	2006
Andrei Vasilevski	1–6	1–4	0–2	5	2009
Vladimir Voltchkov	43–29	24–21	19–8	32	1994
Dzmitry Zhyrmont	6–8	6–8	0–0	8	2012
Alexandr Zotov	0–1	0–1	0–0	1	2006
