= 1990 Kremlin Cup =

- Date: 5–12 November
- Edition: 1st
- Category: World Series
- Draw: 32S / 16D
- Prize money: $297,000
- Surface: Carpet / indoor
- Location: Moscow, Soviet Union
- Venue: Olympic Stadium

Champions

Singles
- (Soviet Union) Andrei Cherkasov

Doubles
- (Netherlands) Hendrik Jan Davids / (Netherlands) Paul Haarhuis
- Kremlin Cup

The 1990 Kremlin Cup, also known by its sponsored name Bayer Indoor Kremlin Cup, was a men's tennis tournament played on indoor carpet courts. It was the 1st edition of the Kremlin Cup, and was part of the World Series of the 1990 ATP Tour. It took place at the Olympic Stadium in Moscow, Soviet Union, from 5 November through 12 November 1990. Only men were involved in singles and doubles - it became a joint event in 1996.

== Finals ==
=== Singles ===
(Soviet Union) Andrei Cherkasov defeated (United States) Tim Mayotte, 6–2, 6–1

- It was Cherkasov's second singles title of his career.

=== Doubles ===
(Netherlands) Hendrik Jan Davids / (Netherlands) Paul Haarhuis defeated (Australia) John Fitzgerald / (Sweden) Anders Järryd, 6–4, 7–6

- It was Davids's 1st title of his career. It was Haarhuis's 1st title of his career.
