= Sebastian Soresini =

Italian tennis player

- Country (sports): Italy
- Born: 11 March 1968 (age 57)

Singles
- Career record: 0–2
- Highest ranking: No. 336 (24 Feb 1992)

Grand Slam singles results
- Wimbledon: Q1 (1992)

Doubles
- Career record: 0–2
- Highest ranking: No. 558 (11 May 1992)

Sebastian Soresini (born 11 March 1968) is an Italian former professional tennis player.

Soresini reached a best singles ranking of 336 in the world. His ATP Tour main draw appearances included the 1991 Milan Indoor, where he was beaten in the first round by third-seed Andrei Chesnokov. He featured in the singles qualifying draw for the 1992 Wimbledon Championships.
