= Andrei Merinov =

Russian tennis player

- Country (sports): Russia
- Born: 23 June 1971 (age 54) Moscow, Russia
- Height: 1.83 m (6 ft 0 in)
- Plays: Left-handed
- Prize money: $185,632

Singles
- Career record: 5-10
- Career titles: 0
- Highest ranking: No. 141 (16 Jun 1997)

Grand Slam singles results
- French Open: 1R (1997)

Doubles
- Career record: 2-11
- Career titles: 0
- Highest ranking: No. 138 (26 Jul 1993)

Andrei Merinov (born 23 June 1971) is a former professional tennis player from Russia.

== Career ==
Merinov was a national junior champion in 1989 and turned professional at the age of 19.

He and partner Vladimir Gabrichidze were doubles semi-finalists in the 1992 Kremlin Cup. At the same event the following year, Merinov reached the quarter-finals in the singles.

The Russian lost to Lionel Roux in the opening round of the 1997 French Open. It would be his only Grand Slam appearance.

He won three Challenger titles during his career and was a doubles runner-up on no less than 10 occasions.

== Challenger Titles ==
=== Singles: (2) ===
No.	Year	Tournament	Surface	Opponent in the final	Score in the final
1.	1993	Eisenach, Germany	Clay	(Germany) Karsten Braasch	6–3, 2–6, 7–5
2.	1997	Puerto Vallarta, Mexico	Hard	(The Bahamas) Mark Knowles	6–3, 7–6

=== Doubles: (1) ===
No.	Year	Tournament	Surface	Partner	Opponents in the final	Score in the final
1.	1993	Tenerife, Spain	Hard	(Latvia) Ģirts Dzelde	(Sweden) Jonas Björkman (Denmark) Michael Mortensen	6–3, 6–4
