= Sergei Skakun =

Belarusian tennis player

- Full name: Sergei Vladimirovich Skakun
- Country (sports): Soviet Union; Belarus
- Born: 26 March 1970 (age 54)

Singles
- Career record: 0–1
- Highest ranking: No. 602 (8 Oct 1990)

Doubles
- Career record: 0–1
- Highest ranking: No. 802 (10 Sep 1990)

Sergei Vladimirovich Skakun (born 26 March 1970) is a Belarusian former professional tennis player.

Skakun made his only ATP Tour singles main draw appearance at the 1991 Kremlin Cup, where he lost in the first round to Rüdiger Haas. In 1994 he appeared in four Davis Cup ties for Belarus and was unbeaten, registering three singles and three doubles wins. This was the first year Belarus had competed in the tournament and Skakun had previously competed on tour under the Soviet flag.

== See also ==
- List of Belarus Davis Cup team representatives
