= Dimitri Poliakov =

Ukrainian tennis player

- Country (sports): Soviet Union (1989–91); Ukraine (1991–1999)
- Residence: Kharkiv, Ukraine
- Born: 19 January 1968 (age 57); Kyiv, Soviet Union
- Height: 1.83 m (6 ft 0 in)
- Turned pro: 1989
- Plays: Right-handed
- Prize money: $438,529

Singles
- Career record: 35–47
- Career titles: 1
- Highest ranking: No. 93 (10 June 1991)

Grand Slam singles results
- Australian Open: 2R (1992)
- French Open: 2R (1994)
- Wimbledon: 1R (1990)
- US Open: 2R (1993)

Doubles
- Career record: 22–35
- Career titles: 0
- Highest ranking: No. 119 (13 July 1992)

Grand Slam doubles results
- Australian Open: 1R (1992)
- Wimbledon: 1R (1992)
- US Open: 1R (1991)

Dimitri Poliakov (born 19 January 1968) is a former professional tennis player from Ukraine.

== Career ==
Poliakov, a clay court specialist and the Soviet singles champion in 1990, had his breakthrough year in 1991, when he won the Yugoslavia Open, an ATP Tour event. This saw him break into the top 100 for the first time. He was also runner-up in the Austrian Open, with partner Pablo Arraya. These would be the only two ATP Tour finals that he reached during his career.

In 1993 he made it into the semi-finals of the Kremlin Cup, as qualifier. He defeated number three seed Amos Mansdorf in the opening round and then best Zimbabwean Byron Black 6–0, 6–3 and Martin Damm of the Czech Republic. His tournament ended when he was defeated by Marc Rosset in three sets.

He had one of the best wins of his career in 1992 when he defeated world number 12 Carlos Costa in Vienna in straight sets.

From 1993 to 1998, Poliakov was a regular fixture in the Ukraine Davis Cup team. He had a 10–2 record in singles. His doubles record was 9–5 and seven of those wins came with Andrei Medvedev, which is a national record. He had also played in two Davis Cup campaigns for the Soviet Union team in 1990 and 1991.

He reached the second round of a Grand Slam singles draw on three occasions, twice as a qualifier. In the men's doubles he appeared in three Grand Slam tournaments but never progressed part the first round.

== ATP career finals ==
=== Singles: 1 (1–0) ===
Result	W/L	Date	Tournament	Surface	Opponent	Score
Win	1–0	May 1991	Umag, Yugoslavia	Clay	(Spain) Javier Sánchez	6–4, 6–4

=== Doubles: 1 (0–1) ===
Result	W/L	Date	Tournament	Surface	Partner	Opponents	Score
Loss	0–1	Aug 1991	Kitzbühel, Austria	Clay	(Peru) Pablo Arraya	(Spain) Tomás Carbonell (Spain) Francisco Roig	7–6, 2–6, 4–6

== Challenger titles ==
=== Singles: (4) ===
No.	Year	Tournament	Surface	Opponent	Score
1.	1989	Fürth, West Germany	Clay	(Italy) Federico Mordegan	6–2, 6–1
2.	1990	Neu-Ulm, West Germany	Clay	(Belgium) Bart Wuyts	3–6, 7–5, 6–3
3.	1991	Bielefeld, Germany	Clay	(Germany) Lars Koslowski	6–4, 6–1
4.	1993	Bruck, Austria	Clay	(Germany) Simon Touzil	6–4, 6–1

=== Doubles: (5) ===
No.	Year	Tournament	Surface	Partner	Opponents	Score
1.	1989	Fürth, West Germany	Clay	(Soviet Union) Vladimir Gabrichidze	(Italy) Cristiano Caratti (Italy) Federico Mordegan	6–4, 6–7, 6–4
2.	1990	Knokke, Belgium	Clay	(Soviet Union) Andrei Olhovskiy	(Belgium) Xavier Daufresne (Belgium) Denis Langaskens	6–4, 4–6, 6–3
3.	1990	Verona, Italy	Clay	(Czechoslovakia) Slava Doseděl	(Netherlands) Jacco Eltingh (Netherlands) Menno Oosting	6–0, 6–7, 6–4
4.	1991	Porto, Portugal	Clay	(Czechoslovakia) Tomáš Anzari	(Netherlands) Paul Haarhuis (Netherlands) Mark Koevermans	3–6, 6–3, 6–4
5.	1993	Eisenach, Germany	Clay	(Sweden) Christer Allgårdh	(Georgia (country)) Vladimir Gabrichidze (Russia) Andrei Merinov	6–7, 6–4, 6–4
