= Vladimir Gabrichidze =

Georgian tennis player

- Country (sports): Soviet Union; Georgia
- Born: 16 May 1968 (age 56); Tbilisi, Georgian SSR
- Height: 1.75 m (5 ft 9 in)
- Turned pro: 1990
- Plays: Right-handed
- Prize money: $108,548

Singles
- Career record: 2–6
- Career titles: 0
- Highest ranking: No. 140 (27 Apr 1992)

Doubles
- Career record: 2–8
- Career titles: 0
- Highest ranking: No. 184 (12 Jul 1993)

Vladimir Gabrichidze (born 16 May 1968) is a former professional tennis player from Georgia.

== Career ==
Gabrichidze won the doubles at the USSR Championships on six occasions and was also the singles winner once. He also represented the Soviet Union in their Davis Cup World Group qualifier in 1990. When he returned to the Davis Cup two years later, it was with the CIS team but from 1995 he competed for the Georgians. By the time he made his last Davis Cup appearance in 2002, Gabrichidze had taken part in 18 ties for Georgia, winning 11 of his 16 singles matches and 10 of 14 doubles rubbers.

In 1991 he played in the biggest tournament of his career, the Italian Open, part of the ATP Tour's Championship Series. He was eliminated in the opening round by Pete Sampras, but did manage to take a set off the American.

He reached the quarter-finals of the Prague Open in 1992 and en route upset world number 52 Renzo Furlan. In the same year he made the Kremlin Cup semi-finals, in the doubles, with partner Andrei Merinov.

== Challenger titles ==
=== Singles: (1) ===
| No. | Year | Tournament | Surface | Opponent | Score |
|---|---|---|---|---|---|
| 1. | 1991 | Pescara, Italy | Clay | (Czechoslovakia) Martin Střelba | 7–5, 6–4 |

=== Doubles: (3) ===
| No. | Year | Tournament | Surface | Partner | Opponents | Score |
|---|---|---|---|---|---|---|
| 1. | 1989 | Fürth, West Germany | Clay | (Soviet Union) Dimitri Poliakov | (Italy) Cristiano Caratti (Italy) Federico Mordegan | 6–4, 6–7, 6–4 |
| 2. | 1991 | Bangalore, India | Clay | (Romania) Mihnea-Ion Năstase | (United Kingdom) Sean Cole (Germany) Martin Zumpft | 2–6, 7–5, 6–3 |
| 3. | 1991 | Geneva, Switzerland | Clay | (Czechoslovakia) Martin Střelba | (Argentina) Roberto Argüello (Argentina) Christian Miniussi | 1–6, 6–3, 6–4 |
