= Carl-Uwe Steeb =

German tennis player (born 1967)

- Country (sports): Germany
- Residence: Reith bei Kitzbühel, Austria
- Born: 1 September 1967 (age 58) Aalen, West Germany
- Height: 1.80 m (5 ft 11 in)
- Turned pro: 1986
- Retired: 1996
- Plays: Left-handed (two-handed backhand)
- Prize money: US$ 2,320,082

Singles
- Career record: 212–212
- Career titles: 3
- Highest ranking: No. 14 (15 January 1990)

Grand Slam singles results
- Australian Open: 4R (1988)
- French Open: 4R (1992)
- Wimbledon: 2R (1989)
- US Open: 4R (1991)

Other tournaments
- Olympic Games: QF (1988)

Doubles
- Career record: 72–79
- Career titles: 3
- Highest ranking: No. 41 (15 May 1989)

Team competitions
- Davis Cup: W (1988, 1989, 1993)

Carl-Uwe Steeb (German pronunciation: [kaʁlˈʔuːvə ˈʃteːp]; born 1 September 1967) is a former professional tennis player from Germany. In his post-playing career he has served as a tennis administrator.

== Playing career ==
Coached by Stefan Schaffelhuber, Steeb turned professional in 1986. He played left-handed. He won his first top-level singles title in 1989 in Gstaad. His best singles performances at Grand Slam events came in reaching the fourth round at the Australian Open in 1988, the US Open in 1991, and the French Open in 1992.

He represented West Germany at the 1988 Olympic Games, losing in the singles to eventual silver medalist Tim Mayotte of the United States in the quarter-final.

Steeb was a member of three German Davis Cup champion teams – in 1988, 1989 and 1993 (he played in the final in '88 and '89, and in the earlier rounds in '93). He laid the foundation for the German 4-1 victory in 1988 in Gothenburg, with an upset five-set win in the singles against then-world number one Mats Wilander of Sweden in the final. His performances in the 1989 event included a singles win in the semi-finals against Andre Agassi in Munich.

Over the course of his career, Steeb won three top-level singles titles and three tour doubles titles. His career-high rankings were World No. 14 in singles (in 1990), and World No. 41 in doubles (in 1989). His career prize money totalled $2,320,082. Steeb retired from the professional tour in 1996.

== Post-playing career ==
In his post-playing career, he worked as Tournament Director of the Nord-LB Open in Braunschweig. He was also Tournament Director of the German Open in Hamburg prior to being succeeded by his former Davis Cuo winning teammate Michael Stich in 2009. Steeb served as the Vice President of Sports for the German Tennis Federation (DTB), having been elected to the position in November 2011. In 2014, he founded the Charley Steeb Tennis Academy.

Steeb has also worked as a co-commentator on tennis for Eurosport.

== Career finals ==
=== Singles (3 wins, 5 losses) ===
Legend
Grand Slam
Tennis Masters Cup
ATP Masters Series
ATP Championship Series
ATP Tour

Result	W/L	Date	Tournament	Surface	Opponent	Score
Win	1–0	Jul 1989	Gstaad, Switzerland	Clay	(Sweden) Magnus Gustafsson	6–7^{(6–8)}, 3–6, 6–2, 6–4, 6–2
Loss	1–1	Oct 1989	Tokyo, Japan	Carpet (i)	(United States) Aaron Krickstein	2–6, 2–6
Loss	1–2	Jan 1990	Sydney, Australia	Hard	(France) Yannick Noah	7–5, 3–6, 4–6
Loss	1–3	Feb 1990	Brussels, Belgium	Carpet (i)	(Germany) Boris Becker	5–7, 2–6, 2–6
Win	2–3	Jun 1991	Genoa, Italy	Clay	(Spain) Jordi Arrese	6–3, 6–4
Loss	2–4	Nov 1992	Moscow, CIS	Carpet (i)	(Switzerland) Marc Rosset	2–6, 2–6
Loss	2–5	Jan 1993	Jakarta, Indonesia	Hard	(United States) Michael Chang	6–2, 2–6, 1–6
Win	3–5	Nov 1995	Moscow, Russia	Carpet (i)	(Czech Republic) Daniel Vacek	7–6^{(7–5)}, 3–6, 7–6^{(8–6)}

=== Doubles (3 wins, 2 losses) ===
Result	W/L	Date	Tournament	Surface	Partner	Opponents	Score
Win	1–0	Oct 1988	Brisbane, Australia	Hard (i)	(Germany) Eric Jelen	(Canada) Grant Connell (Canada) Glenn Michibata	6–4, 6–1
Win	2–0	Aug 1991	Long Island, U.S.	Hard	(Germany) Eric Jelen	(United States) Doug Flach (Italy) Diego Nargiso	0–6, 6–4, 7–6
Win	3–0	Nov 1991	Moscow, Russia	Carpet (i)	(Germany) Eric Jelen	(Soviet Union) Andrei Cherkasov (Soviet Union) Alexander Volkov	6–4, 7–6
Loss	3–1	May 1992	Hamburg, Germany	Clay	(Germany) Michael Stich	(Spain) Sergio Casal (Spain) Emilio Sánchez	7–5, 4–6, 3–6
Loss	3–2	May 1993	Munich, Germany	Clay	(Czech Republic) Karel Nováček	(Czech Republic) Martin Damm (Sweden) Henrik Holm	0–6, 6–3, 5–7
