= Alexander Volkov (tennis) =

Russian tennis player (1967–2019)

Alexander Volkov Алекса́ндр Во́лков
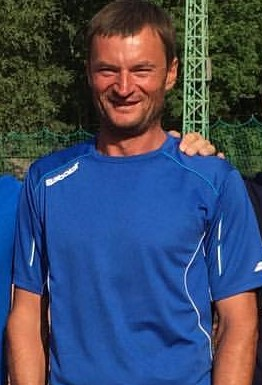
- Country (sports): Soviet Union; Russia
- Born: 3 March 1967 Kaliningrad, Soviet Union
- Died: 19 October 2019 (aged 52) Kaliningrad, Russia
- Height: 1.88 m (6 ft 2 in)
- Turned pro: 1988
- Retired: 1998
- Plays: Left-handed (two-handed backhand)
- Prize money: $3,362,840

Singles
- Career record: 303–255
- Career titles: 3
- Highest ranking: No. 14 (23 August 1993)

Grand Slam singles results
- Australian Open: 4R (1994)
- French Open: 3R (1990, 1992)
- Wimbledon: 4R (1987, 1990, 1991, 1994)
- US Open: SF (1993)

Other tournaments
- Grand Slam Cup: 1R (1992, 1993)
- Olympic Games: 1R (1988)

Doubles
- Career record: 32–55
- Career titles: 0
- Highest ranking: No. 136 (9 October 1989)

Grand Slam doubles results
- Wimbledon: 2R (1988)
- US Open: 1R (1989)

Other doubles tournaments
- Olympic Games: 1R (1988)

Team competitions
- Davis Cup: F (1994, 1995)
- Last updated on: 15 September 2022.

Alexander Vladimirovich Volkov (Russian: Алекса́ндр Влади́мирович Во́лков; 3 March 1967 – 19 October 2019) was a Russian professional tennis player.

== Tennis career ==
Volkov finished runner-up in three tournaments over 1989 and 1990; in the latter year he defeated World No. 1 Stefan Edberg in straight sets in the first round of the US Open. Volkov won his first top-level professional singles title in 1991 at Milan. At Wimbledon that year, he lost a close match in the fourth round to the eventual tournament champion Michael Stich, 4–6, 6–3, 7–5, 1–6, 7–5 despite winning the same number of games as Stich overall in the match, which hinged on a lucky shot hit by the German when he was trailing 4–5 in the final set. With Volkov serving for the match, at 5-4 and 30–30, Stich hit a seemingly-wide shot that caught the net and, instead of going out, looped over Volkov's head and back into play for a winner. What could have been 40-30, and match-point for Volkov, instead became a vital break-point opportunity for Stich at 30-40, that he immediately converted. Stich subsequently won the next two games and the match.

Volkov was runner-up in three tournaments in 1992 and won his second title in 1993 in Auckland. Later in 1993, Volkov defeated Björn Borg in the first round of the Kremlin Cup in Moscow, in a match which proved to be the last of Borg's career. Volkov won the Kremlin Cup a year later in 1994 to claim his third (and final) career title. He reached one more final in 1997 in Shanghai.

His best Grand Slam singles performance was reaching the semifinals of the 1993 US Open, where he defeated Jonathan Stark, Kevin Ullyett, Amos Mansdorf, Chuck Adams and Thomas Muster before losing to Pete Sampras.

Volkov was part of the Russian team that reached the final of the Davis Cup in 1994. He won singles rubbers over Patrick Rafter of Australia in the first round and Michael Stich of Germany in the semifinals. However, he lost both his singles rubbers in the final as Russia was defeated by Sweden 4–1.

Volkov retired from the professional tour in 1998. His career-high singles ranking was world No. 14 in 1994. His career prize-money earnings totalled $3,362,786.

He was Marat Safin's coach before the duo split in July 2007.

== ATP career finals ==
=== Singles: 11 (3 titles, 8 runner-ups) ===
| Legend Grand Slam Tournaments (0–0) ATP World Tour Finals (0–0) ATP Masters Series (0–0) ATP Championship Series (0–0) ATP World Series (3–8) | Finals by surface Hard (1–3) Clay (0–0) Grass (0–1) Carpet (2–4) | Finals by setting Outdoors (1–4) Indoors (2–4) |

| Result | W–L | Date | Tournament | Tier | Surface | Opponent | Score |
|---|---|---|---|---|---|---|---|
| Loss | 0–1 | Feb 1989 | Milan, Italy | Grand Prix | Carpet | (West Germany) Boris Becker | 1–6, 2–6 |
| Loss | 0–2 | Jan 1990 | Rosmalen, Netherlands | World Series | Grass | (Israel) Amos Mansdorf | 3–6, 6–7 |
| Loss | 0–3 | Oct 1990 | Berlin, Germany | World Series | Carpet | (Haiti) Ronald Agénor | 6–4, 4–6, 6–7^{(8–10)} |
| Win | 1–3 | Feb 1991 | Milan, Italy | World Series | Carpet | (Italy) Cristiano Caratti | 6–1, 7–5 |
| Loss | 1–4 | Jan 1992 | Wellington, New Zealand | World Series | Hard | (United States) Jeff Tarango | 1–6, 0–6, 3–6 |
| Loss | 1–5 | Mar 1992 | Rotterdam, Netherlands | World Series | Carpet | (Germany) Boris Becker | 6–7^{(9–11)}, 6–4, 2–6 |
| Loss | 1–6 | Apr 1992 | Johannesburg, South Africa | World Series | Hard | (United States) Aaron Krickstein | 4–6, 4–6 |
| Win | 2–6 | Jan 1993 | Auckland, New Zealand | World Series | Hard | (United States) MaliVai Washington | 7–6^{(7–2)}, 6–4 |
| Loss | 2–7 | Jan 1994 | Adelaide, Australia | World Series | Hard | (Russia) Yevgeny Kafelnikov | 4–6, 3–6 |
| Win | 3–7 | Nov 1994 | Moscow, Russia | World Series | Carpet | (United States) Chuck Adams | 6–2, 6–4 |
| Loss | 3–8 | Feb 1997 | Shanghai, China | World Series | Carpet | (Slovakia) Ján Krošlák | 2–6, 6–7^{(2–7)} |

=== Doubles: 3 (3 runner-ups) ===
| Legend Grand Slam Tournaments (0–0) ATP World Tour Finals (0–0) ATP Masters Series (0–0) ATP Championship Series (0–0) ATP World Series (0–3) | Finals by surface Hard (0–2) Clay (0–0) Grass (0–0) Carpet (0–1) | Finals by setting Outdoors (0–2) Indoors (0–1) |

| Result | W–L | Date | Tournament | Tier | Surface | Partner | Opponents | Score |
|---|---|---|---|---|---|---|---|---|
| Loss | 0–1 | Nov 1991 | Moscow, Soviet Union | World Series | Carpet | (Soviet Union) Andrey Cherkasov | (Germany) Eric Jelen (Germany) Carl-Uwe Steeb | 4–6, 6–7 |
| Loss | 0–2 | Jan 1993 | Auckland, New Zealand | World Series | Hard | (Austria) Alex Antonitsch | (Canada) Grant Connell (United States) Patrick Galbraith | 3–6, 6–7 |
| Loss | 0–3 | Aug 1996 | Long Island, United States | World Series | Hard | (Germany) Hendrik Dreekmann | (United States) Luke Jensen (United States) Murphy Jensen | 3–6, 6–7 |

== ATP Challenger and ITF Futures finals ==
=== Singles: 1 (1–0) ===
| Legend ATP Challenger (1–0) ITF Futures (0–0) | Finals by surface Hard (1–0) Clay (0–0) Grass (0–0) Carpet (0–0) |

| Result | W–L | Date | Tournament | Tier | Surface | Opponent | Score |
|---|---|---|---|---|---|---|---|
| Win | 1–0 | Nov 1996 | Aachen, Germany | Challenger | Hard | (Germany) David Prinosil | 6–3, 7–6 |

== Performance timeline ==
Key
| W | F | SF | QF | #R | RR | Q# | DNQ | A | NH |

(W) winner; (F) finalist; (SF) semifinalist; (QF) quarterfinalist; (#R) rounds 4, 3, 2, 1; (RR) round-robin stage; (Q#) qualification round; (DNQ) did not qualify; (A) absent; (NH) not held; (SR) strike rate (events won / competed); (W–L) win–loss record.

=== Singles ===
| Tournament | 1986 | 1987 | 1988 | 1989 | 1990 | 1991 | 1992 | 1993 | 1994 | 1995 | 1996 | 1997 | SR | W–L | Win % |
|---|---|---|---|---|---|---|---|---|---|---|---|---|---|---|---|
Grand Slam tournaments
| Australian Open | NH | A | 1R | A | 2R | 1R | 3R | 3R | 4R | 1R | 1R | A | 0 / 8 | 8–8 | – |
| French Open | A | A | 1R | A | 3R | 1R | 3R | 1R | 2R | 1R | 1R | 2R | 0 / 9 | 6–9 | 40% |
| Wimbledon | Q1 | 4R | 2R | 1R | 4R | 4R | 3R | 2R | 4R | 3R | 3R | 1R | 0 / 11 | 20–11 | 65% |
| US Open | A | 1R | A | 3R | 2R | 2R | QF | SF | 1R | 3R | 3R | 1R | 0 / 10 | 17–10 | 63% |
| Win–loss | 0–0 | 3–2 | 1–3 | 2–2 | 7–4 | 4–4 | 10–4 | 8–4 | 7–4 | 4–4 | 4–4 | 1–3 | 0 / 38 | 51–38 | 57% |
National Representation
| Summer Olympics | NH | | 1R | Not Held | | | A | Not Held | | | A | NH | 0 / 1 | 0–1 | 0% |
Year-end Championships
| Grand Slam Cup | Did not qualify | | | | | | 1R | 1R | Did not qualify | | | | 0 / 2 | 0–2 | 0% |
ATP Masters Series
| Indian Wells | A | A | A | 1R | 1R | 2R | A | SF | QF | A | A | A | 0 / 5 | 8–5 | 62% |
| Miami | A | 1R | 3R | 3R | 4R | 2R | A | 2R | 2R | A | A | A | 0 / 7 | 7–7 | 50% |
| Monte Carlo | A | A | A | A | A | 3R | 2R | A | A | A | A | A | 0 / 2 | 3–2 | 60% |
| Hamburg | A | A | A | 1R | 1R | 3R | 1R | A | 1R | 1R | 1R | Q1 | 0 / 7 | 2–7 | 22% |
| Rome | A | A | A | A | 2R | 2R | 1R | A | 2R | 1R | A | A | 0 / 5 | 3–5 | 38% |
| Canada | A | A | A | A | 1R | A | A | QF | 1R | 1R | A | A | 0 / 4 | 2–4 | 33% |
| Cincinnati | A | A | 1R | 1R | A | A | 2R | 3R | 1R | A | A | A | 0 / 5 | 3–5 | 38% |
| Paris | A | 2R | A | A | 1R | QF | 3R | 2R | 1R | 2R | A | A | 0 / 7 | 6–7 | 46% |
| Win–loss | 0–0 | 1–2 | 2–2 | 2–4 | 6–6 | 8–6 | 2–5 | 8–5 | 4–7 | 1–4 | 0–1 | 0–0 | 0 / 42 | 34–42 | 45% |

== Junior Grand Slam finals ==
=== Doubles: 1 (1 runner-up) ===
| Result | Year | Championship | Surface | Partner | Opponents | Score |
|---|---|---|---|---|---|---|
| Loss | 1985 | French Open | Clay | (Soviet Union) Vladimer Gabrichidze | (Czechoslovakia) Petr Korda (Czechoslovakia) Cyril Suk | 6–4, 0–6, 5–7 |

== Top 10 wins ==
| Season | 1987 | 1988 | 1989 | 1990 | 1991 | 1992 | 1993 | 1994 | 1995 | 1996 | 1997 | Total |
| Wins | 0 | 0 | 2 | 3 | 1 | 5 | 1 | 4 | 1 | 0 | 0 | 17 |

| # | Player | Rank | Event | Surface | Rd | Score | VR |
1989
| 1. | (Czechoslovakia) Miloslav Mečíř | 8 | Davis Cup, Prague, Czechoslovakia | Carpet (i) | RR | 6–2, 6–7, 6–0 | 64 |
| 2. | (Switzerland) Jakob Hlasek | 8 | Milan, Italy | Carpet (i) | 2R | 7–6, 7–5 | 61 |
1990
| 3. | (United States) Tim Mayotte | 10 | Miami, USA | Hard | 2R | 6–1, 6–4 | 100 |
| 4. | (Sweden) Stefan Edberg | 1 | US Open, New York, USA | Hard | 1R | 6–3, 7–6, 6–2 | 52 |
| 5. | (Spain) Emilio Sánchez | 8 | Stockholm, Sweden | Carpet (i) | 2R | 7–5, 6–3 | 34 |
1991
| 6. | (Czechoslovakia) Karel Nováček | 9 | Basel, Switzerland | Hard (i) | QF | 6–1, 6–7, 6–3 | 24 |
1992
| 7. | (Czechoslovakia) Karel Nováček | 10 | Milan, Italy | Carpet (i) | 1R | 7–6, 7–6 | 25 |
| 8. | (United States) Ivan Lendl | 7 | Stuttgart, Germany | Carpet (i) | 2R | 7–6, 5–7, 6–1 | 28 |
| 9. | (France) Guy Forget | 6 | Stuttgart, Germany | Carpet (i) | QF | 6–4, 6–4 | 28 |
| 10. | (Croatia) Goran Ivanišević | 5 | US Open, New York, USA | Hard | 3R | 6–4, 6–0, 6–3 | 20 |
| 11. | (Sweden) Stefan Edberg | 3 | Tokyo, Japan | Carpet (i) | QF | 6–3, 3–6, 7–5 | 17 |
1993
| 12. | (United States) Pete Sampras | 2 | Indian Wells, United States | Hard | 3R | 7–5, 6–4 | 22 |
1994
| 13. | (United States) Michael Chang | 8 | Indian Wells, United States | Hard | 3R | 6–4, 1–6, 6–3 | 18 |
| 14. | (Germany) Michael Stich | 2 | World Team Cup, Düsseldorf, Germany | Clay | RR | 6–4, 7–6 | 22 |
| 15. | (Germany) Michael Stich | 2 | Davis Cup, Hamburg, Germany | Hard | RR | 7–5, 1–6, 7–6, 6–4 | 42 |
| 16. | (Spain) Alberto Berasategui | 8 | Ostrava, Czech Republic | Carpet (i) | 1R | 7–6, 6–4 | 44 |
1995
| 17. | (Spain) Sergi Bruguera | 4 | Stuttgart, Germany | Carpet (i) | 1R | 6–4, 2–3 ret. | 40 |
