= Andrei Cherkasov =

Russian tennis player

Andrei Cherkasov Андрей Черкасов
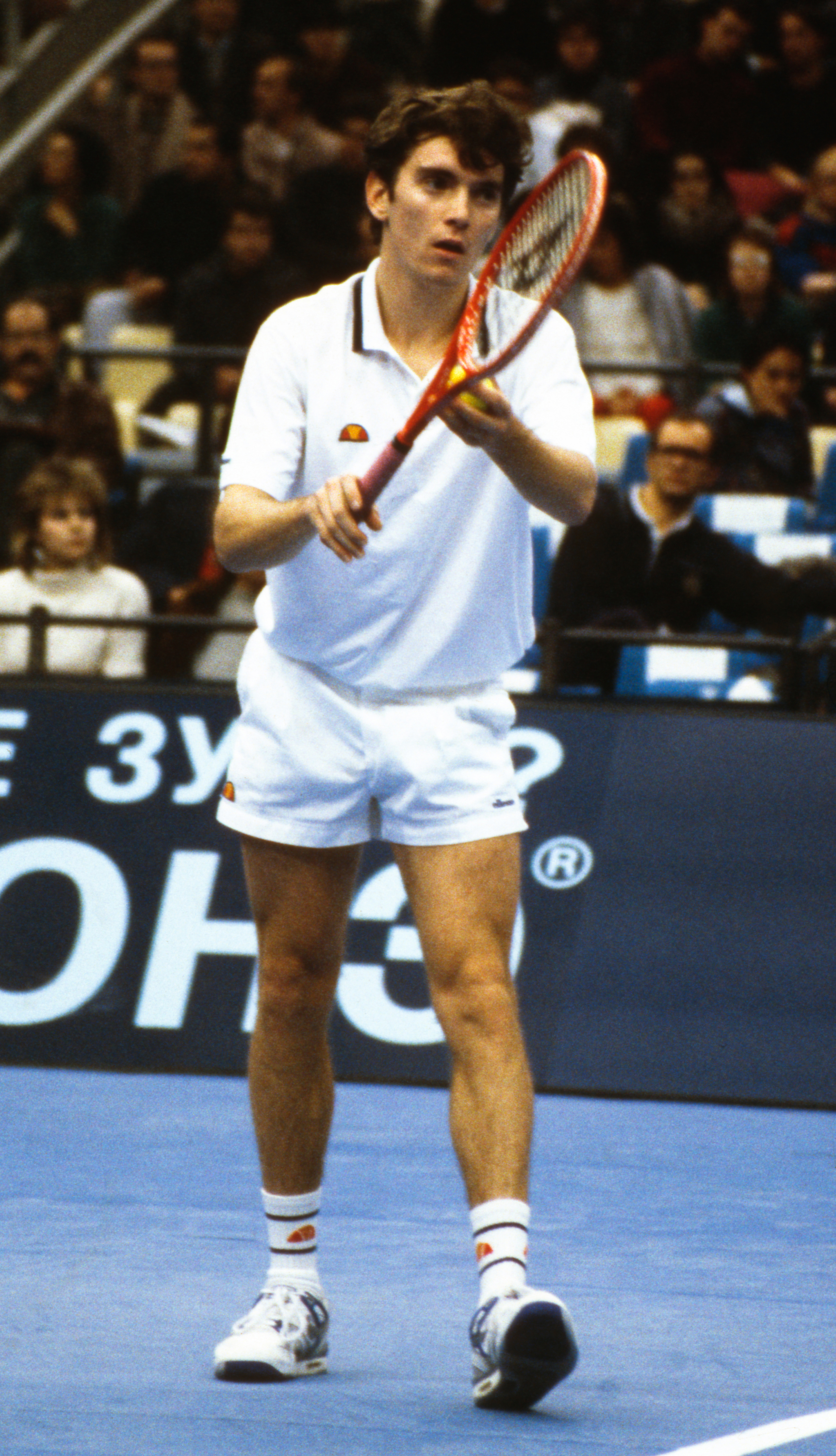
- Cherkasov at first Kremlin Cup, 1990
- Full name: Andrei Gennadievich Cherkasov
- Country (sports): Soviet Union; Russia
- Born: 4 July 1970 (age 56) Ufa, Soviet Union
- Height: 1.80 m (5 ft 11 in)
- Turned pro: 1988
- Retired: 2000
- Plays: Right-handed (two-handed backhand)
- Prize money: $2,260,281

Singles
- Career record: 193–214
- Career titles: 2
- Highest ranking: No. 13 (10 June 1991)

Grand Slam singles results
- Australian Open: QF (1990)
- French Open: QF (1992)
- Wimbledon: 1R (1989, 1990, 1991, 1992, 1993, 1994)
- US Open: QF (1990)

Other tournaments
- Grand Slam Cup: 1R (1990)
- Olympic Games: SF (1992)

Doubles
- Career record: 25–44
- Career titles: 0
- Highest ranking: No. 141 (3 August 1998)

Grand Slam doubles results
- Australian Open: 1R (1991)
- Wimbledon: Q3 (1989)

Grand Slam mixed doubles results
- French Open: 1R (1990)
Medal record
Men's Tennis
Representing Unified Team
Olympic Games
| Bronze medal – third place | 1992 Barcelona | Singles |
- Last updated on: 1 May 2022.

Andrei Gennadievich Cherkasov (Russian: Андрей Геннадьевич Черкасов; born 4 July 1970 in Ufa) is a former professional tennis player from Russia.

== Career ==
Born in Ufa, Soviet Union, Cherkasov first came to the tennis world's attention as an outstanding junior player. In 1987, he was ranked the World No. 3 junior player and finished runner-up in the boys' singles at the US Open (lost to David Wheaton in the final).

Cherkasov turned professional in 1988. In 1990, Cherkasov claimed his first top-level singles titles when he won the inaugural Kremlin Cup in Moscow, defeating Tim Mayotte in the final 6–2, 6–1. He also reached the quarter-finals of the 1990 Australian Open and US Open.

In June 1991 Cherkasov reached his career-high singles ranking of World No. 13. In November he successfully defended his Kremlin Cup title, saving two match points in a 7–6, 3–6, 7–6 win in the final against Jakob Hlasek.

In 1992 Cherkasov was a quarter-finalist at the French Open and won a men's singles bronze medal at the Olympic Games in Barcelona, notably rallying from 2 sets down to beat Pete Sampras in the third round.

In 1993 Cherkasov saved three match points in 3-hour, 54-minute quarter-final victory over Italy's Andrea Gaudenzi at Tel Aviv, to win 6–7, 7–6, 7–5 in what was the longest best-of-three set match in tour history.

In the end, his two victories at the Kremlin Cup in Moscow proved to be the only top-level titles of Cherkasov's career. He retired from the professional tour in 2000.

== ATP career finals ==
=== Singles: 6 (2 titles, 4 runner-ups) ===
| Legend Grand Slam Tournaments (0–0) ATP World Tour Finals (0–0) ATP Masters 1000 Series (0–0) ATP 500 Series (0–1) ATP 250 Series (2–3) | Finals by surface Hard (0–1) Clay (0–2) Grass (0–0) Carpet (2–1) | Finals by setting Outdoors (0–3) Indoors (2–1) |

| Result | W–L | Date | Tournament | Tier | Surface | Opponent | Score |
|---|---|---|---|---|---|---|---|
| Loss | 0–1 | Jan 1989 | Sydney, Australia | Grand Prix | Hard | (United States) Aaron Krickstein | 4–6, 2–6 |
| Win | 1–1 | Nov 1990 | Moscow, USSR | Grand Prix | Carpet | (United States) Tim Mayotte | 6–2, 6–1 |
| Loss | 1–2 | Feb 1991 | Brussels, Belgium | Championship Series | Carpet | (France) Guy Forget | 3–6, 5–7, 6–3, 6–7^{(5–7)} |
| Win | 2–2 | Nov 1991 | Moscow, USSR | World Series | Carpet | (Switzerland) Jakob Hlasek | 7–6^{(7–2)}, 3–6, 7–6^{(7–5)} |
| Loss | 2–3 | May 1993 | Bologna, Italy | World Series | Clay | (Spain) Jordi Burillo | 6–7^{(4–7)}, 7–6^{(9–7)}, 1–6 |
| Loss | 2–4 | Sep 1993 | Bucharest, Romania | World Series | Clay | (Croatia) Goran Ivanišević | 2–6, 6–7^{(5–7)} |

=== Doubles: 2 (2 runners-up) ===
| Legend Grand Slam Tournaments (0–0) ATP World Tour Finals (0–0) ATP Masters Series (0–0) ATP Championship Series (0–0) ATP World Series (0–2) | Finals by surface Hard (0–0) Clay (0–1) Grass (0–0) Carpet (0–1) | Finals by setting Outdoors (0–1) Indoors (0–1) |

| Result | W–L | Date | Tournament | Tier | Surface | Partner | Opponents | Score |
|---|---|---|---|---|---|---|---|---|
| Loss | 0–1 | May 1990 | Umag, Croatia | World Series | Clay | (Soviet Union) Andrei Olhovskiy | (Czech Republic) Vojtech Flegl (Czech Republic) Daniel Vacek | 4–6, 4–6 |
| Loss | 0–2 | Nov 1991 | Moscow, USSR | World Series | Carpet | (Soviet Union) Alexander Volkov | (Germany) Eric Jelen (Germany) Carl-Uwe Steeb | 4–6, 6–7 |

== ATP Challenger and ITF Futures finals ==
=== Singles: 9 (5–4) ===
| Legend ATP Challenger (4–2) ITF Futures (1–2) | Finals by surface Hard (3–0) Clay (2–4) Grass (0–0) Carpet (0–0) |

| Result | W–L | Date | Tournament | Tier | Surface | Opponent | Score |
|---|---|---|---|---|---|---|---|
| Win | 1-0 | Apr 1989 | Oporto, Portugal | Challenger | Clay | (Spain) Javier Sánchez | 7–6, 7–5 |
| Win | 2-0 | Apr 1989 | Lisbon, Portugal | Challenger | Clay | (Spain) Tomas Carbonell | 7–6, 6–3 |
| Loss | 2-1 | May 1993 | Ljubljana, Slovenia | Challenger | Clay | (Argentina) Daniel Orsanic | 6–4, 2–6, 5–7 |
| Win | 3-1 | Sep 1995 | Singapore, Singapore | Challenger | Hard | (Japan) Yasufumi Yamamoto | 6–1, 6–3 |
| Win | 4-1 | Dec 1996 | Daytona Beach, United States | Challenger | Hard | (Germany) Tommy Haas | 7–6, 3–6, 7–5 |
| Loss | 4-2 | Aug 1998 | Warsaw, Poland | Challenger | Clay | (Czech Republic) Jiri Vanek | 6–7, 5–7 |
| Win | 5-2 | Apr 2001 | USA F9, Stone Mountain | Futures | Hard | (United States) Robert Kendrick | 6–1, 6–1 |
| Loss | 5-3 | Jul 2002 | Denmark F1, Copenhagen | Futures | Clay | (France) Edouard Roger-Vasselin | 2–6, 3–6 |
| Loss | 5-4 | Aug 2002 | Latvia F1, Jūrmala | Futures | Clay | (Finland) Timo Nieminen | 6–4, 4–6, 2–6 |

=== Doubles: 7 (3–4) ===
| Legend ATP Challenger (2–3) ITF Futures (1–1) | Finals by surface Hard (3–0) Clay (0–4) Grass (0–0) Carpet (0–0) |

| Result | W–L | Date | Tournament | Tier | Surface | Partner | Opponents | Score |
|---|---|---|---|---|---|---|---|---|
| Loss | 0–1 | Sep 1996 | Tashkent, Uzbekistan | Challenger | Clay | (Italy) Laurence Tieleman | (Argentina) Marcelo Charpentier (Spain) Albert Portas | 1–6, 2–6 |
| Win | 1–1 | Sep 1997 | Azores, Portugal | Challenger | Hard | (Argentina) Gaston Etlis | (Sweden) Nils Holm (Sweden) Lars-Anders Wahlgren | 6–7, 7–5, 6–3 |
| Win | 2–1 | Dec 1997 | Eilat, Israel | Challenger | Hard | (Germany) Patrick Baur | (Netherlands) Sander Groen (Netherlands) Rogier Wassen | 6–3, 7–6 |
| Loss | 2–2 | Apr 1998 | Paget, Bermuda | Challenger | Clay | (France) Rodolphe Gilbert | (United States) Doug Flach (United States) Richey Reneberg | 6–3, 4–6, 2–6 |
| Loss | 2–3 | Aug 1999 | Poznań, Poland | Challenger | Clay | (United States) Hugo Armando | (Italy) Massimo Ardinghi (Italy) Davide Sanguinetti | 4–6, 4–6 |
| Loss | 2–4 | Aug 2002 | Latvia F1, Jūrmala | Futures | Clay | (Austria) Dmitri Kotchetkov | (Socialist Federal Republic of Yugoslavia) Aleksander Jerinkic (Australia) Steven Randjelovic | 3–6, 1–6 |
| Win | 3–4 | Jun 2004 | Spain F11, Lanzarote | Futures | Hard | (Ukraine) Orest Tereshchuk | (Australia) Jaymon Crabb (Australia) Brodie Stewart | 6–3, 4–6, 6–3 |

== Junior Grand Slam finals ==
=== Singles: 1 (1 runner-up) ===
| Result | Year | Championship | Surface | Opponent | Score |
|---|---|---|---|---|---|
| Loss | 1987 | US Open | Hard | (United States) David Wheaton | 5–7, 0–6 |

== Performance timeline ==
Key
| W | F | SF | QF | #R | RR | Q# | DNQ | A | NH |

(W) winner; (F) finalist; (SF) semifinalist; (QF) quarterfinalist; (#R) rounds 4, 3, 2, 1; (RR) round-robin stage; (Q#) qualification round; (DNQ) did not qualify; (A) absent; (NH) not held; (SR) strike rate (events won / competed); (W–L) win–loss record.

=== Singles ===
| Tournament | 1988 | 1989 | 1990 | 1991 | 1992 | 1993 | 1994 | 1995 | 1996 | 1997 | 1998 | 1999 | 2000 | 2001 | SR | W–L | Win % |
|---|---|---|---|---|---|---|---|---|---|---|---|---|---|---|---|---|---|
Grand Slam tournaments
| Australian Open | A | A | QF | 2R | 2R | 1R | 2R | A | 1R | 1R | Q1 | 2R | Q2 | A | 0 / 8 | 8–8 | 50% |
| French Open | A | 2R | 2R | 4R | QF | 1R | 1R | Q1 | Q2 | Q2 | Q1 | Q2 | Q1 | Q1 | 0 / 6 | 9–6 | 60% |
| Wimbledon | Q1 | 1R | 1R | 1R | 1R | 1R | 1R | A | A | A | A | A | A | A | 0 / 6 | 0–6 | 0% |
| US Open | A | 1R | QF | 1R | 1R | 1R | 1R | A | A | A | A | Q2 | Q1 | A | 0 / 6 | 4–6 | 40% |
| Win–loss | 0–0 | 1–3 | 9–4 | 4–4 | 5–4 | 0–4 | 1–4 | 0–0 | 0–1 | 0–1 | 0–0 | 1–1 | 0–0 | 0–0 | 0 / 26 | 21–26 | 45% |
Olympic Games
| Summer Olympics | 2R | Not Held | | | SF | Not Held | | | A | Not Held | | | A | NH | 0 / 2 | 5–2 | 71% |
ATP Masters Series
| Indian Wells | A | A | A | 3R | QF | 1R | 1R | A | Q2 | A | A | A | A | A | 0 / 4 | 5–4 | 56% |
| Miami | A | A | 1R | 2R | QF | 2R | 3R | A | A | A | 1R | Q1 | A | A | 0 / 6 | 4–6 | 40% |
| Monte Carlo | A | A | A | 3R | 1R | 3R | 1R | Q2 | 1R | Q2 | A | Q2 | A | A | 0 / 5 | 4–5 | 44% |
| Hamburg | A | 2R | 3R | 2R | 2R | A | 1R | 1R | A | Q1 | Q1 | Q2 | A | A | 0 / 6 | 5–6 | 45% |
| Rome | A | A | A | QF | 2R | 1R | 1R | A | A | A | A | A | A | A | 0 / 4 | 4–4 | 50% |
| Cincinnati | A | 1R | A | QF | 2R | 2R | 2R | A | A | A | A | A | A | A | 0 / 5 | 6–5 | 55% |
| Paris | A | A | 2R | 2R | 1R | 2R | A | Q3 | A | Q2 | A | A | A | A | 0 / 4 | 3–4 | 43% |
| Win–loss | 0–0 | 1–2 | 3–3 | 12–7 | 9–7 | 4–6 | 2–6 | 0–1 | 0–1 | 0–0 | 0–1 | 0–0 | 0–0 | 0–0 | 0- / 34 | 31–34 | 48% |
