= Marc Rosset =

Swiss tennis player (born 1970)

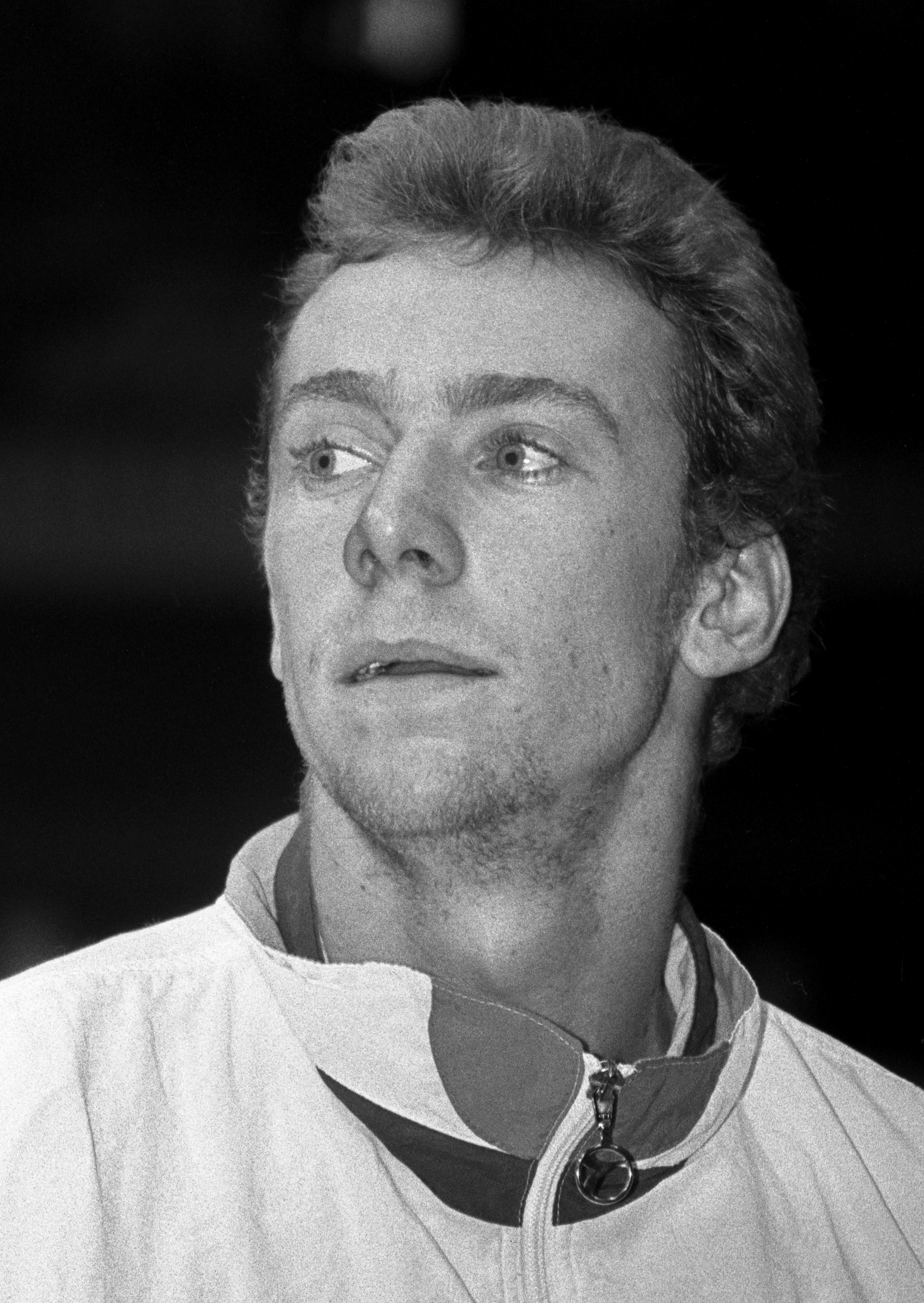
- Rosset at the 1992 Kremlin Cup
- Country (sports): Switzerland
- Residence: Monte Carlo, Monaco
- Born: 7 November 1970 (age 55) Geneva, Switzerland
- Height: 2.01 m (6 ft 7 in)
- Turned pro: 1988
- Retired: 2005
- Plays: Right-handed (two-handed backhand) *occasionally used one-handed backhand
- Prize money: $6,812,693

Singles
- Career record: 433–351
- Career titles: 15
- Highest ranking: No. 9 (11 September 1995)

Grand Slam singles results
- Australian Open: QF (1999)
- French Open: SF (1996)
- Wimbledon: 4R (2000)
- US Open: 4R (1995)

Other tournaments
- Grand Slam Cup: 1R (1996)
- Olympic Games: W (1992)

Doubles
- Career record: 142–144
- Career titles: 8
- Highest ranking: No. 8 (2 November 1992)

Grand Slam doubles results
- Australian Open: 2R (1991, 1992, 1994)
- French Open: W (1992)
- Wimbledon: 3R (1993, 2001)
- US Open: 2R (1990, 1992, 1993, 2000)

Team competitions
- Davis Cup: F (1992)
- Hopman Cup: F (1996)
Medal record
Olympic Games
Gold medal – first place	1992 Barcelona	Singles

Marc Rosset (French: [maʁk ʁɔsɛ]; born 7 November 1970) is a Swiss former professional tennis player. He is best known for winning the men's singles gold medal at the 1992 Summer Olympics. He also won a major doubles title, at the French Open in 1992 partnering compatriot Jakob Hlasek. Rosset's career-high ATP singles ranking was world No. 9, and his career-high doubles ranking was No. 8. He won a total of 15 top-level singles titles and eight doubles titles. He won at least one singles title on all surfaces: clay, grass, carpet, and hardcourt.

== Career ==
At 2.01 meters (6 ft. 7 in.), Rosset was one of the game's tallest players throughout his career. He was one of the game's fastest servers and most prolific servers of aces for most of his career.

Rosset turned professional in 1988 and won his first tour singles title in 1989 in Geneva as a wildcard, defeating Guillermo Pérez Roldán. His first doubles title was won in Geneva as well in 1991 with partner Sergi Bruguera.

1992 was the pinnacle of Rosset's career. Representing Switzerland at the Olympic Games in Barcelona, at 21 years, 275 days old he defeated several top players en route to qualifying for the men's singles final, including Jim Courier, Goran Ivanišević, Wayne Ferreira, and Emilio Sánchez. In the final, he faced Spain's Jordi Arrese and won an five-set match to claim the gold medal.

Rosset also won the 1992 French Open men's doubles title with partner Jakob Hlasek. Rosset also was a member of the Swiss team which reached the final of the 1992 Davis Cup. Switzerland lost in the final to the United States despite Rosset's winning a five-set singles rubber against Jim Courier (who was ranked world No. 1 at the time).

In 2001, Rosset's most memorable Davis Cup match came in defeat in a singles rubber against Arnaud Clément of France, which he lost 15–13 in the fifth set after 5 hours and 46 minutes. During the later years of his playing career, Rosset also served as the Swiss Davis Cup team captain.

Rosset also enjoyed success playing in other international team competitions for Switzerland. In 1996, he was a member of the teams which won the World Team Cup and finished runners-up in the Hopman Cup. That year he also achieved his best performance at a Grand Slam, the 1996 French Open when he defeated Carl-Uwe Steeb, Jiří Novák, Jakob Hlasek, Stefan Edberg and Bernd Karbacher before losing to Michael Stich in the semifinals.

Rosset had a 2–2 record against his successor as Switzerland's top male tennis player, Roger Federer. Rosset won their first two meetings in 2000 (including the final of the Open 13 at Marseille), but Federer won their meetings in 2001 and 2003.

== Personal life ==
Rosset changed his flight plans after a first-round defeat at the US Open in September 1998. After he changed his plans, the flight he had originally planned to take, Swissair Flight 111, crashed in the Atlantic Ocean, killing all on board.

== Career statistics ==
=== Grand Slam finals ===
==== Doubles: 1 (1 title) ====
Result	Year	Championship	Surface	Partner	Opponent	Score
Win	1992	French Open	Clay	(Switzerland) Jakob Hlasek	(South Africa) David Adams (Russia) Andrei Olhovskiy	7–6^{(7–4)}, 6–7^{(3–7)}, 7–5

=== Olympic Games ===
==== Singles: 1 (1 gold medal) ====
Result	Year	Championship	Surface	Opponent	Score
Win	1992	Barcelona Olympics	Clay	(Spain) Jordi Arrese	7–6^{(7–2)}, 6–4, 3–6, 4–6, 8–6

=== Masters Series finals ===
==== Singles: 1 (1 runner-up) ====
Result	Year	Tournament	Surface	Opponent	Score
Loss	1994	Paris Masters	Carpet (i)	(United States) Andre Agassi	3–6, 3–6, 6–4, 5–7

==== Doubles: 1 (1 title) ====
Result	Year	Tournament	Surface	Partner	Opponent	Score
Win	1992	Rome Masters	Clay	(Switzerland) Jakob Hlasek	(South Africa) Wayne Ferreira (Australia) Mark Kratzmann	6–4, 3–6, 6–1

== Career finals ==
=== Singles: 23 (15–8) ===
Winner – Legend Grand Slam (0–0) Tennis Masters Cup (0–0) Olympic Games (1–0) ATP Masters Series (0–1) ATP Championship Series (2–3) ATP Tour (12–4)	Finals by surface Hard (4–3) Clay (3–2) Grass (1–0) Carpet (7–3)

Result	W-L	Date	Tournament	Surface	Opponent	Score
Win	1–0	Sep 1989	Geneva, Switzerland	Clay	(Argentina) Guillermo Pérez Roldán	6–4, 7–5
Loss	1–1	Apr 1990	Madrid, Spain	Clay	(Ecuador) Andrés Gómez	3–6, 6–7^{(3–7)}
Loss	1–2	May 1990	Bologna, Italy	Clay	(Australia) Richard Fromberg	6–4, 4–6, 6–7^{(5–7)}
Win	2–2	Oct 1990	Lyon, France	Carpet (i)	(Sweden) Mats Wilander	6–3, 6–2
Win	3–2	Aug 1992	Summer Olympics, Spain	Clay	(Spain) Jordi Arrese	7–6^{(7–2)}, 6–4, 3–6, 4–6, 8–6
Win	4–2	Nov 1992	Moscow, Russia	Carpet (i)	(Germany) Carl Uwe Steeb	6–2, 6–2
Win	5–2	Feb 1993	Marseille, France	Carpet (i)	(Netherlands) Jan Siemerink	6–2, 7–6^{(7–1)}
Win	6–2	Aug 1993	Long Island, USA	Hard	(United States) Michael Chang	6–4, 3–6, 6–1
Win	7–2	Nov 1993	Moscow, Russia	Carpet (i)	(Germany) Patrik Kühnen	6–4, 6–3
Win	8–2	Feb 1994	Marseille, France (2)	Carpet (i)	(France) Arnaud Boetsch	7–6^{(8–6)}, 7–6^{(7–4)}
Loss	8–3	Aug 1994	New Haven, United States	Hard	(Germany) Boris Becker	3–6, 5–7
Win	9–3	Oct 1994	Lyon, France	Carpet (i)	(United States) Jim Courier	6–4, 7–6^{(7–2)}
Loss	9–4	Nov 1994	Paris, France	Carpet (i)	(United States) Andre Agassi	3–6, 3–6, 6–4, 5–7
Win	10–4	Apr 1995	Nice, France	Clay	(Russia) Yevgeny Kafelnikov	6–4, 6–0
Win	11–4	Jun 1995	Halle, Germany	Grass	(Germany) Michael Stich	3–6, 7–6^{(13–11)}, 7–6^{(10–8)}
Loss	11–5	Mar 1996	Milan, Italy	Carpet (i)	(Croatia) Goran Ivanišević	3–6, 6–7^{(3–7)}
Win	12–5.	Feb 1997	Antwerp, Belgium	Hard (i)	(United Kingdom) Tim Henman	6–2, 7–5, 6–4
Loss	12–6	Sep 1997	Tashkent, Uzbekistan	Hard	(United Kingdom) Tim Henman	6–7^{(2–7)}, 4–6
Loss	12–7	Feb 1998	St. Petersburg, Russia	Carpet (i)	(Netherlands) Richard Krajicek	4–6, 6–7^{(5–7)}
Loss	12–8	Feb 1998	Antwerp, Belgium	Hard	(United Kingdom) Greg Rusedski	6–7^{(3–7)}, 6–3, 1–6, 4–6,
Win	13–8	Feb 1999	St. Petersburg, Russia	Carpet (i)	(Germany) David Prinosil	6–3, 6–4
Win	14–8	Feb 2000	Marseille, France (3)	Hard (i)	(Switzerland) Roger Federer	2–6, 6–3, 7–6^{(7–5)}
Win	15–8	Feb 2000	London, UK	Hard (i)	(Russia) Yevgeny Kafelnikov	6–4, 6–4

=== Singles performance timeline ===
Key
W	F	SF	QF	#R	RR	Q#	DNQ	A	NH

(W) winner; (F) finalist; (SF) semifinalist; (QF) quarterfinalist; (#R) rounds 4, 3, 2, 1; (RR) round-robin stage; (Q#) qualification round; (DNQ) did not qualify; (A) absent; (NH) not held; (SR) strike rate (events won / competed); (W–L) win–loss record.

Tournament	1988	1989	1990	1991	1992	1993	1994	1995	1996	1997	1998	1999	2000	2001	2002	2003	2004	2005	Career SR
Grand Slam tournaments
Australian Open	A	A	1R	1R	4R	A	3R	1R	A	2R	2R	QF	2R	2R	A	1R	A	A	0 / 11
French Open	A	A	2R	1R	1R	2R	1R	2R	SF	4R	1R	1R	2R	1R	A	1R	A	A	0 / 13
Wimbledon	A	A	3R	1R	3R	1R	2R	1R	3R	2R	2R	2R	4R	1R	2R	1R	A	A	0 / 14
US Open	A	A	1R	1R	1R	1R	3R	4R	1R	1R	1R	1R	2R	1R	1R	A	A	A	0 / 13
Grand Slam SR	0 / 0	0 / 0	0 / 4	0 / 4	0 / 4	0 / 3	0 / 4	0 / 4	0 / 3	0 / 4	0 / 4	0 / 4	0 / 4	0 / 4	0 / 2	0 / 3	0 / 0	0 / 0	0 / 51
Masters Series
Indian Wells	NME		A	2R	1R	QF	3R	A	1R	3R	1R	A	A	1R	A	A	A	A	0 / 7
Miami	NME		1R	QF	3R	4R	3R	A	4R	2R	3R	2R	1R	1R	1R	A	A	A	0 / 12
Monte-Carlo	NME		QF	1R	3R	3R	1R	3R	1R	2R	1R	1R	1R	1R	A	A	A	A	0 / 12
Rome	NME		A	1R	3R	3R	1R	1R	3R	3R	A	1R	1R	A	A	A	A	A	0 / 9
Hamburg	NME		A	1R	A	2R	1R	QF	3R	1R	1R	2R	3R	1R	A	A	A	A	0 / 10
Canada	NME		A	A	A	A	3R	2R	2R	A	A	A	1R	A	A	A	A	A	0 / 4
Cincinnati	NME		A	A	1R	A	A	A	1R	A	A	A	1R	A	A	A	A	A	0 / 3
Stuttgart (Stockholm)	NME		3R	1R	A	SF	3R	3R	2R	1R	1R	1R	2R	A	A	A	A	A	0 / 10
Paris	NME		3R	1R	1R	3R	F	3R	QF	1R	3R	3R	3R	A	A	A	A	A	0 / 11
Masters Series SR	N/A		0 / 4	0 / 7	0 / 6	0 / 7	0 / 8	0 / 6	0 / 9	0 / 7	0 / 6	0 / 6	0 / 8	0 / 4	0 / 1	0 / 0	0 / 0	0 / 0	0 / 78
Year-end ranking	474	45	22	60	35	16	14	15	22	31	31	46	28	119	101	122	214	1306	N/A

=== Doubles: 12 (8–3) ===
Winner – Legend Grand Slam (1–0) Tennis Masters Cup (0–0) Olympic Gold Medal (0–0) ATP Masters Series (1–0) ATP Championship Series (0–0) ATP Tour (6–3)	Finals by surface Hard (2–0) Clay (4–3) Grass (0–0) Carpet (2–0)

Result	W-L	Date	Tournament	Surface	Partner	Opponents	Score
Win	1–0	Sep 1991	Geneva, Switzerland	Clay	(Spain) Sergi Bruguera	(Sweden) Per Henricsson (Sweden) Ola Jonsson	3–6, 6–3, 6–3
Win	2–0	Jan 1992	Adelaide, Australia	Hard	(Croatia) Goran Ivanišević	(Australia) Mark Kratzmann (Australia) Jason Stoltenberg	7–6, 7–6
Win	3–0	May 1992	Rome, Italy	Clay	(Switzerland) Jakob Hlasek	(South Africa) Wayne Ferreira (Australia) Mark Kratzmann	6–4, 3–6, 6–1
Win	4–0	Jun 1992	French Open, Paris	Clay	(Switzerland) Jakob Hlasek	(South Africa) David Adams (Russia) Andrei Olhovskiy	7–6, 6–7, 7–5
Loss	4–1	Jun 1992	Stuttgart, Germany	Clay	(Spain) Javier Sanchez	(United States) Glenn Layendecker (South Africa) Byron Talbot	6–4, 3–6, 4–6
Win	5–1	Oct 1992	Lyon, France	Carpet (i)	(Switzerland) Jakob Hlasek	(United Kingdom) Neil Broad (South Africa) Stefan Kruger	6–1, 6–3
Win	6–1	Jul 1993	Gstaad, Switzerland	Clay	(France) Cédric Pioline	(Netherlands) Hendrik Jan Davids (South Africa) Piet Norval	6–3, 3–6, 7–6
Loss	6–2	Jul 1995	Gstaad, Switzerland	Clay	(France) Arnaud Boetsch	(Argentina) Luis Lobo (Spain) Javier Sánchez	7–6, 6–7, 6–7
Win	7–2	Oct 1997	Basel, Switzerland	Carpet (i)	(United Kingdom) Tim Henman	(Germany) Karsten Braasch (United States) Jim Grabb	7–6, 6–7, 7–6
Win	8–2	Sep 1999	Tashkent, Uzbekistan	Hard	(Uzbekistan) Oleg Ogorodov	(United States) Mark Keil (Switzerland) Lorenzo Manta	7–6, 7–6
Loss	8–3	Jul 2004	Gstaad, Switzerland	Clay	(Switzerland) Stan Wawrinka	(India) Leander Paes (Czech Republic) David Rikl	4–6, 2–6

=== Team competition: 1 (1 title, 2 runner-ups) ===
Result	No.	Date	Tournament	Surface	Partners/Team	Opponents	Score
Loss	1.	Dec 1992	Davis Cup, Fort Worth, US	Carpet (i)	(Switzerland) Jakob Hlasek (Switzerland) Thierry Grin (Switzerland) Claudio Mezzadri	(United States) Andre Agassi (United States) Jim Courier (United States) John McEnroe (United States) Pete Sampras	1–3
Loss	2.	Jan 1996	Hopman Cup, Australia	Hard	(Switzerland) Martina Hingis	(Croatia) Iva Majoli (Croatia) Goran Ivanišević	1–2
Win	1.	May 1996	World Team Cup, Düsseldorf	Clay	(Switzerland) Jakob Hlasek	(Czech Republic) Petr Korda (Czech Republic) Daniel Vacek	6–3, 6–4

== Top 10 wins ==
Season	1989	1990	1991	1992	1993	1994	1995	1996	1997	1998	1999	2000	2001	2002	2003	2004	Total
Wins	0	2	1	4	4	4	2	5	3	4	1	2	0	0	0	1	33

#	Player	Rank	Event	Surface	Rd	Score	RR
1990
1.	(Spain) Emilio Sánchez	7	Madrid, Spain	Clay	2R	4–6, 6–4, 6–4	47
2.	(Spain) Emilio Sánchez	9	Gstaad, Switzerland	Clay	QF	6–4, 3–6, 6–3	28
1991
3.	(Czechoslovakia) Ivan Lendl	4	New Haven, United States	Hard	3R	6–4, 6–4	41
1992
4.	(Czechoslovakia) Ivan Lendl	10	Rome, Italy	Clay	2R	6–4, 2–6, 7–6^{(7–3)}	45
5.	(United States) Jim Courier	1	Summer Olympics, Barcelona	Clay	3R	6–4, 6–2, 6–1	44
6.	(Croatia) Goran Ivanišević	4	Summer Olympics, Barcelona	Clay	SF	6–3, 7–5, 6–2	44
7.	(United States) Jim Courier	1	Davis Cup, Fort Worth, United States	Hard (i)	RR	6–3, 6–7^{(9–11)}, 3–6, 6–4, 6–4	35
1993
8.	(United States) Andre Agassi	8	Indian Wells, United States	Hard	2R	3–6, 7–6^{(7–5)}, 6–4	33
9.	(Germany) Boris Becker	4	Monte Carlo, Monaco	Clay	2R	7–6^{(7–3)}, 6–3	26
10.	(United States) Michael Chang	7	Long Island, United States	Hard	F	6–4, 3–6, 6–1	30
11.	(United States) Jim Courier	2	Stockholm, Sweden	Carpet (i)	3R	6–7^{(5–7)}, 6–3, 7–6^{(7–3)}	21
1994
12.	(Germany) Michael Stich	2	Marseille, France	Hard (i)	SF	6–2, 2–6, 6–4	17
13.	(Ukraine) Andriy Medvedev	7	New Haven, United States	Hard	QF	6–3, 3–6, 7–6^{(8–6)}	20
14.	(Germany) Boris Becker	3	Paris Masters, France	Carpet (i)	3R	7–6^{(7–3)}, 7–6^{(9–7)}	16
15.	(United States) Michael Chang	9	Paris Masters, France	Carpet (i)	QF	6–7^{(4–7)}, 6–3, 6–4	16
1995
16.	(Russia) Yevgeny Kafelnikov	4	Nice, France	Clay	F	6–4, 6–0	18
17.	(Germany) Michael Stich	10	Halle, Germany	Grass	F	3–6, 7–6^{(13–11)}, 7–6^{(10–8)}	13
1996
18.	(Russia) Yevgeny Kafelnikov	8	Milan, Italy	Carpet (i)	SF	4–6, 6–2, 6–4	14
19.	(Germany) Boris Becker	5	World Team Cup, Düsseldorf	Clay	RR	7–6^{(7–4)}, 6–4	15
20.	(Sweden) Thomas Enqvist	9	World Team Cup, Düsseldorf	Clay	RR	6–1, 2–6, 6–3	15
21.	(South Africa) Wayne Ferreira	6	Vienna, Austria	Carpet (i)	1R	6–2, 7–6^{(7–4)}	25
22.	(United States) Pete Sampras	1	Paris Masters, France	Carpet (i)	2R	6–4, 6–4	23
1997
23.	(Spain) Carlos Moyà	7	Munich, Germany	Clay	QF	7–5, 7–6^{(7–5)}	20
24.	(Russia) Yevgeny Kafelnikov	5	Gstaad, Switzerland	Clay	1R	6–4, 6–3	28
25.	(Russia) Yevgeny Kafelnikov	4	Tashkent, Uzbekistan	Hard	SF	3–6, 7–6^{(7–5)}, 6–2	28
1998
26.	(Russia) Yevgeny Kafelnikov	6	Antwerp, Belgium	Hard (i)	2R	6–3, 6–3	26
27.	(Australia) Pat Rafter	3	Antwerp, Belgium	Hard (i)	SF	7–6^{(7–4)}, 7–6^{(7–2)}	26
28.	(France) Cédric Pioline	10	Wimbledon, London	Grass	1R	6–4, 3–6, 4–6, 7–6^{(7–5)}, 13–11	39
29.	(Netherlands) Richard Krajicek	9	Paris Masters, France	Carpet (i)	2R	6–4, 5–7, 2–5 ret.	41
1999
30.	(United Kingdom) Tim Henman	7	Australian Open, Melbourne	Hard	3R	7–6^{(7–5)}, 6–3, 7–5	31
2000
31.	(Russia) Yevgeny Kafelnikov	3	London, United Kingdom	Hard (i)	F	6–4, 6–4	72
32.	(Ecuador) Nicolás Lapentti	9	Hamburg, Germany	Clay	1R	7–6^{(7–4)}, 6–3	41
2004
33.	(Argentina) Guillermo Coria	4	Marseille, France	Hard (i)	2R	7–6^{(7–2)}, 6–1	122
