= 1996 Wimbledon Championships – Men's singles qualifying =

Men's singles qualifying
- 1996 Wimbledon Championships

Events
Singles	men	women		boys	girls
Doubles	men	women	mixed	boys	girls
WC Singles	men	women	quad
WC Doubles	men	women	quad
Legends	men	women	seniors

Qualification
Singles	men	women
Doubles	men	women
- Wimbledon Championships

Players and pairs who neither have high enough rankings nor receive wild cards may participate in a qualifying tournament held one week before the annual Wimbledon Tennis Championships.

== Seeds ==
1. (Canada) Sébastien Lareau (first round)
2. (Belgium) Dick Norman (second round)
3. n/a
4. (Canada) Daniel Nestor (qualified)
5. (Sweden) Anders Järryd (qualifying competition, lucky loser)
6. (India) Leander Paes (qualifying competition, lucky loser)
7. (United States) Jared Palmer (qualified)
8. (Italy) Laurence Tieleman (first round)
9. (Australia) Andrew Ilie (qualified)
10. (South Africa) David Nainkin (qualifying competition, lucky loser)
11. (Italy) Diego Nargiso (qualified)
12. (Zimbabwe) Wayne Black (first round)
13. (Germany) Jörn Renzenbrink (qualified)
14. (Finland) Tuomas Ketola (first round)
15. (France) Thierry Champion (qualified)
16. (Romania) Andrei Pavel (first round)
17. (Italy) Vincenzo Santopadre (first round)
18. (Canada) Albert Chang (qualifying competition, lucky loser)
19. (Germany) Arne Thoms (qualifying competition)
20. (Netherlands) Hendrik Jan Davids (first round)
21. (France) Thierry Guardiola (second round)
22. (Australia) Peter Tramacchi (qualified)
23. (France) Daniel Courcol (first round)
24. (Netherlands) Sander Groen (first round)
25. (United States) Steve Bryan (qualifying competition)
26. (Australia) James Sekulov (second round)
27. (Israel) Noam Behr (first round)
28. (South Africa) Neville Godwin (qualified)
29. (United States) Bill Behrens (second round)
30. (Argentina) Martín Rodríguez (second round)
31. (Australia) Todd Larkham (first round)
32. (United States) Jim Grabb (qualified)

== Qualifiers ==
1. (United States) Jim Grabb
2. (France) Stéphane Huet
3. (Netherlands) Tom Kempers
4. (Canada) Daniel Nestor
5. (United States) Doug Flach
6. (South Africa) Neville Godwin
7. (United States) Jared Palmer
8. (France) Pierre Bouteyre
9. (Australia) Andrew Ilie
10. (United States) Alex O'Brien
11. (Italy) Diego Nargiso
12. (Australia) Peter Tramacchi
13. (Germany) Jörn Renzenbrink
14. (Switzerland) Lorenzo Manta
15. (France) Thierry Champion
16. (Italy) Mosé Navarra

== Lucky losers ==
1. (Sweden) Anders Järryd
2. (India) Leander Paes
3. (South Africa) David Nainkin
4. (Canada) Albert Chang

== Qualifying draw ==
=== First qualifier ===
First round
1	(Canada) Sébastien Lareau	6	2
(South Africa) David Adams	7	6
(Italy) Davide Sanguinetti	7	7
(United States) David DiLucia	6	5
(France) Olivier Malcor	6	6
(United States) Kip Brady	3	2
(Australia) Joshua Eagle	6	4
32	(United States) Jim Grabb	7	6

Second round
(South Africa) David Adams	6	1	6
(Italy) Davide Sanguinetti	2	6	2
(France) Olivier Malcor	1	2
32	(United States) Jim Grabb	6	6

Qualifying competition
(South Africa) David Adams	3	6^{5}	4
32	(United States) Jim Grabb	6	7^{7}	6

=== Second qualifier ===
First round
2	(Belgium) Dick Norman	6	6	6
(United States) Louis Gloria	3	7	2
(France) Stéphane Huet	6	6
(Spain) David Salvador-Estepa	3	1
(Australia) Wayne Arthurs	7	6
(New Zealand) Alistair Hunt	6	4
(Australia) Grant Doyle	7	7
31	(Australia) Todd Larkham	5	6

Second round
2	(Belgium) Dick Norman	7	6	1
(France) Stéphane Huet	6	7	6
(Australia) Wayne Arthurs	6	6	0^{r}
(Australia) Grant Doyle	4	7	0

Qualifying competition
(France) Stéphane Huet	3	4	6	6	6
(Australia) Grant Doyle	6	6	1	2	1

=== Third qualifier ===
First round
Alt	(United States) Chad Clark	7	3
(United States) Brian MacPhie	5	1^{r}
(Sweden) Nicklas Utgren	6	6
(Austria) Rainer Falenti	3	4
(Netherlands) Tom Kempers	5	6	6
WC	(United Kingdom) Tom Hand	7	3	2
(Switzerland) Valentin Frieden	1	6
30	(Argentina) Martín Rodríguez	6	7

Second round
Alt	(United States) Chad Clark	7	7
(Sweden) Nicklas Utgren	6	5
(Netherlands) Tom Kempers	6	6
30	(Argentina) Martín Rodríguez	1	2

Qualifying competition
Alt	(United States) Chad Clark	1	7^{8}	7^{11}	4	4
(Netherlands) Tom Kempers	6	6^{6}	6^{9}	6	6

=== Fourth qualifier ===
First round
4	(Canada) Daniel Nestor	6	6
(United Kingdom) Ross Matheson	4	3
(United States) Scott Humphries	6	6
(Republic of Ireland) Owen Casey	1	1
(Germany) Mathias Müller	6	1	4
(United States) Kenny Thorne	3	6	6
(Germany) Rainer Schüttler	6	2
29	(United States) Bill Behrens	7	6

Second round
4	(Canada) Daniel Nestor	6	7	7
(United States) Scott Humphries	7	6	5
(United States) Kenny Thorne	5	6	6
29	(United States) Bill Behrens	7	4	4

Qualifying competition
4	(Canada) Daniel Nestor	4	6	6	6
(United States) Kenny Thorne	6	3	3	1

=== Fifth qualifier ===
First round
5	(Sweden) Anders Järryd	2	6	6
(Sweden) Kalle Flygt	6	3	3
(United Kingdom) Barry Cowan	2	4
(Kenya) Paul Wekesa	6	6
(United States) Doug Flach	6	6
(Portugal) Vasco Gonçalves	2	0
(Australia) Ben Ellwood	6	6
27	(Israel) Noam Behr	2	4

Second round
5	(Sweden) Anders Järryd	6	7
(Kenya) Paul Wekesa	1	5
(United States) Doug Flach	6	6
(Australia) Ben Ellwood	4	4

Qualifying competition
5	(Sweden) Anders Järryd	6	6	2	1	3
(United States) Doug Flach	4	1	6	6	6

=== Sixth qualifier ===
First round
6	(India) Leander Paes	6	6
(Israel) Eyal Erlich	4	4
(Austria) Georg Blumauer	2	6	6
(France) Antony Dupuis	6	3	4
(Australia) Leigh Holland	6	2
(France) Gilles Bastié	7	6
(South Africa) Michael de Jongh	5	2
26	(South Africa) Neville Godwin	7	6

Second round
6	(India) Leander Paes	6	7
(Austria) Georg Blumauer	3	6
(France) Gilles Bastié	4	4
26	(South Africa) Neville Godwin	6	6

Qualifying competition
6	(India) Leander Paes	6	3	4	3
26	(South Africa) Neville Godwin	3	6	6	6

=== Seventh qualifier ===
First round
7	(United States) Jared Palmer	6	6
(India) Mahesh Bhupathi	3	3
(Israel) Amir Hadad	6	7
(United States) Richard Schmidt	2	5
(Switzerland) Ivo Heuberger	4	7	0
(Australia) Paul Kilderry	6	6	6
WC	(United Kingdom) Nick Weal	3	6	2
25	(United States) Steve Bryan	6	4	6

Second round
7	(United States) Jared Palmer	6	6
(Israel) Amir Hadad	2	3
(Australia) Paul Kilderry	6	3
25	(United States) Steve Bryan	7	6

Qualifying competition
7	(United States) Jared Palmer	6	7	6
25	(United States) Steve Bryan	3	5	3

=== Eighth qualifier ===
First round
8	(Italy) Laurence Tieleman	6	6	4
(United States) Keith Evans	4	7	6
(Italy) Nicola Bruno	5	4
(Argentina) Andrés Zingman	7	6
(France) Pierre Bouteyre	6	6
(Italy) Pietro Pennisi	3	0
(Romania) George Cosac	3	6	3
26	(Australia) James Sekulov	6	2	6

Second round
(United States) Keith Evans	6	6	4
(Argentina) Andrés Zingman	3	7	6
(France) Pierre Bouteyre	7	3	6
26	(Australia) James Sekulov	6	6	4

Qualifying competition
(Argentina) Andrés Zingman	2	2	7^{7}	6	3
(France) Pierre Bouteyre	6	6	6^{4}	3	6

=== Ninth qualifier ===
First round
9	(Australia) Andrew Ilie	3	6	6
(United States) Geoff Grant	6	4	2
WC	(United Kingdom) Martin Lee	4	1
(United States) Ivan Baron	6	6
(Argentina) Francisco Yunis	1	4
(South Africa) Chris Haggard	6	6
(Argentina) Diego del Río	6	6	8
23	(France) Daniel Courcol	4	7	6

Second round
9	(Australia) Andrew Ilie	6	7
(United States) Ivan Baron	3	5
(South Africa) Chris Haggard	6	2	6
(Argentina) Diego del Río	4	6	1

Qualifying competition
9	(Australia) Andrew Ilie	6^{5}	7^{7}	6	2	6
(South Africa) Chris Haggard	7^{7}	6^{3}	3	6	3

=== Tenth qualifier ===
First round
10	(South Africa) David Nainkin	6	6
(Czech Republic) Libor Němeček	4	4
(Germany) Christian Vinck	3	4
(United States) Glenn Weiner	6	6
WC	(United Kingdom) Tom Spinks	1	4
(United Kingdom) Paul Hand	6	6
(United States) Alex O'Brien	6	6
24	(Netherlands) Sander Groen	3	4

Second round
10	(South Africa) David Nainkin	6	6
(United States) Glenn Weiner	3	0
(United Kingdom) Paul Hand	3	4
(United States) Alex O'Brien	6	6

Qualifying competition
10	(South Africa) David Nainkin	1	3	6^{1}
(United States) Alex O'Brien	6	6	7^{7}

=== Eleventh qualifier ===
First round
11	(Italy) Diego Nargiso	6	6
(Germany) Sascha Bandermann	3	4
(United States) Alex Reichel	6	6
(Ghana) Frank Ofori	3	3
(United Kingdom) Jamie Delgado	4	7	1
(Netherlands) Peter Wessels	6	6	6
(United States) Justin Gimelstob	6	6	2
21	(France) Thierry Guardiola	3	7	6

Second round
11	(Italy) Diego Nargiso	6	6
(United States) Alex Reichel	1	1
(Netherlands) Peter Wessels	7	3	9
21	(France) Thierry Guardiola	6	6	7

Qualifying competition
11	(Italy) Diego Nargiso	7	7^{7}	6
(Netherlands) Peter Wessels	5	6^{3}	4

=== Twelfth qualifier ===
First round
12	(Zimbabwe) Wayne Black	5	6	6
(France) Olivier Soules	7	3	8
(France) Nicolas Kischkewitz	6	6
(Czech Republic) Radovan Světlík	2	3
(Netherlands) Eddy Bank	2	5
(Austria) Gerald Mandl	6	7
(Netherlands) Raemon Sluiter	1	4
22	(Australia) Peter Tramacchi	6	6

Second round
(France) Olivier Soules	4	6	6
(France) Nicolas Kischkewitz	6	1	4
(Austria) Gerald Mandl	6	3	4
22	(Australia) Peter Tramacchi	4	6	6

Qualifying competition
(France) Olivier Soules	5	4	3
22	(Australia) Peter Tramacchi	7	6	6

=== Thirteenth qualifier ===
First round
13	(Germany) Jörn Renzenbrink	6	6
(Latvia) Ģirts Dzelde	3	0
(Spain) Óscar Burrieza	6	6
(France) Pier Gauthier	3	4
(Spain) José Alejos	6	5	2
(Israel) Oren Motevassel	3	7	6
(Italy) Massimo Ardinghi	3	6	4
19	(Germany) Arne Thoms	6	2	6

Second round
13	(Germany) Jörn Renzenbrink	4	6	6
(Spain) Óscar Burrieza	6	2	3
(Israel) Oren Motevassel	3	3
19	(Germany) Arne Thoms	6	6

Qualifying competition
13	(Germany) Jörn Renzenbrink	6	3	2	6	7
19	(Germany) Arne Thoms	3	6	6	4	5

=== Fourteenth qualifier ===
First round
14	(Finland) Tuomas Ketola	6	4	4
(Switzerland) Lorenzo Manta	1	6	6
(Australia) Steven Randjelovic	6	6
WC	(United Kingdom) William Herbert	3	2
WC	(Belarus) Max Mirnyi	6	7
(Israel) Ofer Sela	4	6
(North Macedonia) Aleksandar Kitinov	7	6
20	(Netherlands) Hendrik Jan Davids	6	2

Second round
(Switzerland) Lorenzo Manta	6	6
(Australia) Steven Randjelovic	4	4
WC	(Belarus) Max Mirnyi	7	6
(North Macedonia) Aleksandar Kitinov	6	4

Qualifying competition
(Switzerland) Lorenzo Manta	6	7	6
WC	(Belarus) Max Mirnyi	2	5	4

=== Fifteenth qualifier ===
First round
15	(France) Thierry Champion	6	6
WC	(United Kingdom) Arvind Parmar	4	1
(Ivory Coast) Claude N'Goran	5	2
(France) Lionel Barthez	7	6
(Czechoslovakia) Tomáš Zdražila	3	3
(United States) Brett Dickinson	6	6
WC	(United Kingdom) Michael Wyeth	0	2
18	(Canada) Albert Chang	6	6

Second round
15	(France) Thierry Champion	6	3	6
(France) Lionel Barthez	3	6	2
(United States) Brett Dickinson	3	1
18	(Canada) Albert Chang	6	6

Qualifying competition
15	(France) Thierry Champion	5	6	7^{7}	7^{8}
18	(Canada) Albert Chang	7	4	6^{5}	6^{6}

=== Sixteenth qualifier ===
First round
16	(Romania) Andrei Pavel	4	4
(Australia) Jamie Holmes	6	6
(Belgium) Fabien Cousin	6	6
(Italy) Mosé Navarra	7	7
(United States) Mashiska Washington	3	4
WC	(United Kingdom) Simon Pender	6	6
(United Kingdom) Andrew Richardson	7	2	11
17	(Italy) Vincenzo Santopadre	6	6	9

Second round
(Australia) Jamie Holmes	6	6	6
(Italy) Mosé Navarra	7	3	8
WC	(United Kingdom) Simon Pender	2	4
(United Kingdom) Andrew Richardson	6	6

Qualifying competition
(Italy) Mosé Navarra	7	7^{7}	4	7
(United Kingdom) Andrew Richardson	5	6^{3}	6	5
