= 1989 Head Cup – Doubles =

Doubles
- 1989 Head Cup

Final
- Champions: (Spain) Emilio Sánchez (Spain) Javier Sánchez
- Runners-up: (Czechoslovakia) Petr Korda (Czechoslovakia) Tomáš Šmíd
- Score: 7–5, 7–6

Details
- Draw: 32 (1WC)
- Seeds: 8

Events
Singles	Doubles
← 1988 ·	Austrian Open Kitzbühel	· 1990 →

Sergio Casal and Emilio Sánchez were the two-time defending champions, but Casal did not compete this year due to a wrist injury.

Emilio Sánchez teamed up with his brother Javier and successfully defended his title, by defeating Petr Korda and Tomáš Šmíd 7–5, 7–6 in the final.

== Seeds ==
1. (Spain) Emilio Sánchez / (Spain) Javier Sánchez (champions)
2. (Czechoslovakia) Petr Korda / (Czechoslovakia) Tomáš Šmíd (final)
3. (Spain) Tomás Carbonell / (Spain) Carlos Costa (semifinals)
4. (Iran) Mansour Bahrami / (Austria) Horst Skoff (quarterfinals)
5. (Austria) Alex Antonitsch / (Hungary) Balázs Taróczy (quarterfinals)
6. (Italy) Simone Colombo / (Switzerland) Claudio Mezzadri (semifinals)
7. (Czechoslovakia) Jaroslav Navrátil / (Czechoslovakia) Richard Vogel (second round)
8. (Argentina) Horacio de la Peña / (Mexico) Leonardo Lavalle (first round)

== Draw ==
=== Key ===
- Q = Qualifier
- WC = Wild card
- LL = Lucky loser
- Alt = Alternate
- ITF = ITF entry
- PR = Protected ranking
- SR = Special ranking
- SE = Special exempt
- JE = Junior exempt
- JR = Junior Accelerator Programme entrant
- CO = College Accelerator Programme entrant
- NG = Next Gen Accelerator Program entrant
- w/o = Walkover
- r = Retired
- d = Defaulted

=== Finals ===
Semifinals
1	(Spain) Emilio Sánchez (Spain) Javier Sánchez	6	6
6	(Italy) Simone Colombo (Switzerland) Claudio Mezzadri	3	4
3	(Spain) Tomás Carbonell (Spain) Carlos Costa	6	3	2
2	(Czechoslovakia) Petr Korda (Czechoslovakia) Tomáš Šmíd	4	6	6

Final
1	(Spain) Emilio Sánchez (Spain) Javier Sánchez	7	7
2	(Czechoslovakia) Petr Korda (Czechoslovakia) Tomáš Šmíd	5	6

=== Top half ===
First round
1	(Spain) E Sánchez (Spain) J Sánchez	7	7
(Argentina) E Bengoechea (Uruguay) D Pérez	6	6
(Czechoslovakia) J Bulant (Czechoslovakia) V Flégl	4	6
(Spain) S Bruguera (Czechoslovakia) M Vajda	6	7
(Socialist Federal Republic of Yugoslavia) G Prpić (Czechoslovakia) C Suk	6	1	6
(Spain) F Clavet (Ecuador) R Viver	3	6	7
(United States) L Duncan (Argentina) M Ingaramo	1	4
7	(Czechoslovakia) J Navrátil (Czechoslovakia) R Vogel	6	6
4	(Iran) M Bahrami (Austria) H Skoff	7	7
(Austria) T Buchmayer (Czechoslovakia) M Střelba	5	5
WC	(Austria) Harald Mair (Austria) G Schaller	6	1	0
(Italy) C Pistolesi (Spain) V Solves	3	6	6
(Peru) A Aramburú (Chile) R Gajardo	6	1	3
(Argentina) R Argüello (Argentina) F Yunis	4	6	6
(Spain) JA Conde (Italy) R Furlan	6	6	1
6	(Italy) S Colombo (Switzerland) C Mezzadri	3	7	6

Second round
1	(Spain) E Sánchez (Spain) J Sánchez	6	6
(Spain) S Bruguera (Czechoslovakia) M Vajda	4	2
(Spain) F Clavet (Ecuador) R Viver	6	3	6
7	(Czechoslovakia) J Navrátil (Czechoslovakia) R Vogel	4	6	4
4	(Iran) M Bahrami (Austria) H Skoff	6	6
(Italy) C Pistolesi (Spain) V Solves	3	2
(Argentina) R Argüello (Argentina) F Yunis	1	5
6	(Italy) S Colombo (Switzerland) C Mezzadri	6	7

Quarterfinals
1	(Spain) E Sánchez (Spain) J Sánchez	6	6	6
(Spain) F Clavet (Ecuador) R Viver	3	7	4
4	(Iran) M Bahrami (Austria) H Skoff	6	3
6	(Italy) S Colombo (Switzerland) C Mezzadri	7	6

Semifinals
1	(Spain) E Sánchez (Spain) J Sánchez	6	6
6	(Italy) S Colombo (Switzerland) C Mezzadri	3	4

=== Bottom half ===
First round
5	(Austria) A Antonitsch (Hungary) B Taróczy	6	7
(Spain) JC Báguena (Spain) J Clavet	3	5
(Austria) A Buchwald (Austria) S Lochbihler	0^{r}
(Argentina) G Giussani (Spain) F Roig	3
(Italy) F Cancellotti (Italy) M Cierro	4	1
(Soviet Union) A Cherkasov (Socialist Federal Republic of Yugoslavia) M Ostoja	6	6
(United States) G Bezecny (Austria) H Priller	3	4
3	(Spain) T Carbonell (Spain) C Costa	6	6
8	(Argentina) H de la Peña (Mexico) L Lavalle	6	6	1
(Argentina) M Jaite (Argentina) G Pérez Roldán	2	7	6
(Soviet Union) A Olhovskiy (Soviet Union) A Volkov	7	6
(France) R Gilbert (France) C Pioline	5	4
(Argentina) R Azar (Japan) E Furusho	6	6
(Finland) J Berner (India) S Vasudevan	4	3
(Spain) J Aguilera (Spain) F Luna	2	2
2	(Czechoslovakia) P Korda (Czechoslovakia) T Šmíd	6	6

Second round
5	(Austria) A Antonitsch (Hungary) B Taróczy	6	6
(Argentina) G Giussani (Spain) F Roig	4	4
(Soviet Union) A Cherkasov (Socialist Federal Republic of Yugoslavia) M Ostoja	6	4
3	(Spain) T Carbonell (Spain) C Costa	7	6
(Argentina) M Jaite (Argentina) G Pérez Roldán	3	3
(Soviet Union) A Olhovskiy (Soviet Union) A Volkov	6	6
(Argentina) R Azar (Japan) E Furusho	2	1
2	(Czechoslovakia) P Korda (Czechoslovakia) T Šmíd	6	6

Quarterfinals
5	(Austria) A Antonitsch (Hungary) B Taróczy	6	4
3	(Spain) T Carbonell (Spain) C Costa	7	6
(Soviet Union) A Olhovskiy (Soviet Union) A Volkov	3	1
2	(Czechoslovakia) P Korda (Czechoslovakia) T Šmíd	6	6

Semifinals
3	(Spain) T Carbonell (Spain) C Costa	6	3	2
2	(Czechoslovakia) P Korda (Czechoslovakia) T Šmíd	4	6	6
