= 1991 Philips Austrian Open – Singles =

Singles
- 1991 Philips Austrian Open

Final
- Champion: (Czechoslovakia) Karel Nováček
- Runner-up: (Sweden) Magnus Gustafsson
- Score: 7–6^{(7–2)}, 7–6^{(7–4)}, 6–2

Details
- Draw: 48 (4WC/6Q)
- Seeds: 16

Events
Singles	Doubles
- Austrian Open Kitzbühel

Horacio de la Peña was the defending champion, but lost in the third round to Francisco Clavet.

Third-seeded Karel Nováček won the title by defeating Magnus Gustafsson 7–6^{(7–2)}, 7–6^{(7–4)}, 6–2 in the final.

== Seeds ==
All seeds received a bye to the second round.

1. (Spain) Sergi Bruguera (second round)
2. (Spain) Emilio Sánchez (quarterfinals)
3. (Czechoslovakia) Karel Nováček (champion)
4. (Sweden) Magnus Gustafsson (final)
5. (Austria) Horst Skoff (quarterfinals)
6. (Argentina) Alberto Mancini (third round)
7. (Spain) Francisco Clavet (semifinals)
8. (Argentina) Martín Jaite (semifinals)
9. (Argentina) Horacio de la Peña (third round)
10. (Sweden) Christian Bergström (third round)
11. (Spain) Javier Sánchez (third round)
12. (France) Thierry Champion (quarterfinals)
13. (Czechoslovakia) Marián Vajda (third round)
14. (Austria) Thomas Muster (third round)
15. (Uruguay) Marcelo Filippini (second round)
16. (France) Cédric Pioline (second round)

== Draw ==
Key

- Q = Qualifier
- WC = Wild card
- LL = Lucky loser
- Alt = Alternate
- ITF = ITF entry
- PR = Protected ranking
- SR = Special ranking
- SE = Special exempt
- JE = Junior exempt
- JR = Junior Accelerator Programme entrant
- CO = College Accelerator Programme entrant
- NG = Next Gen Accelerator Program entrant
- w/o = Walkover
- r = Retired
- d = Defaulted

=== Finals ===
Quarterfinals
Q	(Germany) Markus Zillner	2	3
7	(Spain) Francisco Clavet	6	6
3	(Czechoslovakia) Karel Nováček	7	0	7
5	(Austria) Horst Skoff	5	6	5
12	(France) Thierry Champion	6	3	1
4	(Sweden) Magnus Gustafsson	4	6	6
8	(Argentina) Martín Jaite	6	3	6
2	(Spain) Emilio Sánchez	3	6	3

Semifinals
7	(Spain) Francisco Clavet	3	7^{7}	2
3	(Czechoslovakia) Karel Nováček	6	6^{2}	6
4	(Sweden) Magnus Gustafsson	6	6
8	(Argentina) Martín Jaite	2	2

Final
3	(Czechoslovakia) Karel Nováček	7^{7}	7^{7}	6
4	(Sweden) Magnus Gustafsson	6^{2}	6^{4}	2

=== Top half ===
==== Section 1 ====
First round
(Sweden) H Holm	1	4
(Italy) C Pistolesi	6	6
Q	(Germany) M Zillner	4	6	6
Q	(Poland) W Kowalski	6	4	3
(Peru) P Arraya	6^{2}	3
(Spain) G López	7^{7}	6
Q	(Germany) M Geserer	1	5
(Germany) P Kühnen	6	7

Second round
1	(Spain) S Bruguera	3	6	6
(Italy) C Pistolesi	6	2	1
Q	(Germany) M Zillner	5	6	6
15	(Uruguay) M Filippini	7	3	3
9	(Argentina) H de la Peña	6	6
(Spain) G López	3	0
(Germany) P Kühnen	6	4	4
7	(Spain) F Clavet	1	6	6

Third round
1	(Spain) S Bruguera	1	6	2
Q	(Germany) M Zillner	6	1	6
9	(Argentina) H de la Peña	4	2
7	(Spain) F Clavet	6	6

Quarterfinals
Q	(Germany) M Zillner	2	3
7	(Spain) F Clavet	6	6

==== Section 2 ====
First round
(Germany) K Braasch	2	6	6
(France) A Boetsch	6	4	2
(France) T Benhabiles	3	6	6
(Soviet Union) A Võsand	6	4	2
(Spain) T Carbonell	6	1	3
(Soviet Union) D Poliakov	4	6	6
(Germany) C Saceanu	4	1
(France) R Gilbert	6	6

Second round
3	(Czechoslovakia) K Nováček	6	6
(Germany) K Braasch	2	3
(France) T Benhabiles	3	3
13	(Czechoslovakia) M Vajda	6	6
11	(Spain) J Sánchez	7	6
(Soviet Union) D Poliakov	5	2
(France) R Gilbert	2	1
5	(Austria) H Skoff	6	6

Third round
3	(Czechoslovakia) K Nováček	6	7^{7}
13	(Czechoslovakia) M Vajda	1	6^{4}
11	(Spain) J Sánchez	4	3
5	(Austria) H Skoff	6	6

Quarterfinals
3	(Czechoslovakia) K Nováček	7	0	7
5	(Austria) H Skoff	5	6	5

=== Bottom half ===
==== Section 3 ====
First round
(France) O Delaître	7^{8}	6
WC	(Austria) R Wawra	6^{6}	1
WC	(Austria) T Buchmayer	6	0	6
(Spain) F Roig	4	6	2
(Czechoslovakia) M Střelba	6	5	0
(Australia) J Anderson	4	7	6
(Italy) D Nargiso	6	6
(Finland) A Rahunen	2	2

Second round
6	(Argentina) A Mancini	7^{8}	7^{7}
(France) O Delaître	6^{6}	6^{4}
WC	(Austria) T Buchmayer	6	4	6^{4}
12	(France) T Champion	3	6	7^{7}
14	(Austria) T Muster	6	6
(Australia) J Anderson	3	1
(Italy) D Nargiso	4	5
4	(Sweden) M Gustafsson	6	7

Third round
6	(Argentina) A Mancini	2	2
12	(France) T Champion	6	6
14	(Austria) T Muster	5	6	3
4	(Sweden) M Gustafsson	7	2	6

Quarterfinals
12	(France) T Champion	6	3	1
4	(Sweden) M Gustafsson	4	6	6

==== Section 4 ====
First round
WC	(Germany) E Jelen	7^{7}	7^{8}
(Germany) U Riglewski	6^{3}	6^{6}
(Soviet Union) A Olhovskiy	4	4
WC	(Austria) G Mandl	6	6
Q	(Czechoslovakia) R Vogel	6	6
(Brazil) C Motta	2	3
Q	(France) É Winogradsky	6	6^{4}	6
Q	(France) T Guardiola	4	7^{7}	3

Second round
8	(Argentina) M Jaite	6	6^{1}	6
WC	(Germany) E Jelen	3	7^{7}	2
WC	(Austria) G Mandl	6^{5}	7^{7}	6^{5}
10	(Sweden) C Bergström	7^{7}	6^{4}	7^{7}
16	(France) C Pioline	6^{4}	2
Q	(Czechoslovakia) R Vogel	7^{7}	6
Q	(France) É Winogradsky	6^{4}	4
2	(Spain) E Sánchez	7^{7}	6

Third round
8	(Argentina) M Jaite	6	6
10	(Sweden) C Bergström	4	3
Q	(Czechoslovakia) R Vogel	3	6	2
2	(Spain) E Sánchez	6	4	6

Quarterfinals
8	(Argentina) M Jaite	6	3	6
2	(Spain) E Sánchez	3	6	3
