= 1991 Philips Austrian Open – Doubles =

Doubles
- 1991 Philips Austrian Open

Final
- Champions: (Spain) Tomás Carbonell (Spain) Francisco Roig
- Runners-up: (Peru) Pablo Arraya (Soviet Union) Dimitri Poliakov
- Score: 6–7, 6–2, 6–4

Details
- Draw: 24 (1Q/1LL)
- Seeds: 8

Events
Singles	Doubles
← 1990 ·	Austrian Open Kitzbühel	· 1992 →

Javier Sánchez and Éric Winogradsky were the defending champions, but lost in the quarterfinals to Pablo Arraya and Dimitri Poliakov.

Tomás Carbonell and Francisco Roig won the title by defeating Arraya and Poliakov 6–7, 6–2, 6–4 in the final.

== Seeds ==
All seeds received a bye to the second round.

1. (Czechoslovakia) Vojtěch Flégl / (Czechoslovakia) Cyril Suk (semifinals)
2. (Iran) Mansour Bahrami / (Czechoslovakia) Daniel Vacek (semifinals)
3. (Spain) Javier Sánchez / (France) Éric Winogradsky (quarterfinals)
4. (South Africa) David Adams / (Soviet Union) Andrei Olhovskiy (quarterfinals)
5. (Sweden) Magnus Gustafsson / (Czechoslovakia) Karel Nováček (Second round, withdrew)
6. (Spain) Tomás Carbonell / (Spain) Francisco Roig (champions)
7. (Australia) Johan Anderson / (Italy) Diego Nargiso (quarterfinals)
8. (Spain) Francisco Clavet / (Austria) Horst Skoff (quarterfinals)

== Draw ==
=== Key ===
- Q = Qualifier
- WC = Wild card
- LL = Lucky loser
- Alt = Alternate
- ITF = ITF entry
- PR = Protected ranking
- SR = Special ranking
- SE = Special exempt
- JE = Junior exempt
- JR = Junior Accelerator Programme entrant
- CO = College Accelerator Programme entrant
- NG = Next Gen Accelerator Program entrant
- w/o = Walkover
- r = Retired
- d = Defaulted

=== Finals ===
Semifinals
1	(Czechoslovakia) Vojtěch Flégl (Czechoslovakia) Cyril Suk	4	2
(Peru) Pablo Arraya (Soviet Union) Dimitri Poliakov	6	6
6	(Spain) Tomás Carbonell (Spain) Francisco Roig	6	3	6
2	(Iran) Mansour Bahrami (Czechoslovakia) Daniel Vacek	3	6	3

Final
(Peru) Pablo Arraya (Soviet Union) Dimitri Poliakov	7	2	4
6	(Spain) Tomás Carbonell (Spain) Francisco Roig	6	6	6

=== Top half ===
First round
LL	(Germany) M Joachim (Germany) Gisbert Pauli	7	6
(Germany) M Geserer (Socialist Federal Republic of Yugoslavia) Slobodan Vojinović	6	4
(Germany) F Krumrey (Soviet Union) A Merinov	4	3
(Uruguay) M Filippini (Argentina) A Mancini	6	6
(France) T Guardiola (Italy) C Pistolesi	5	6	1
(France) T Benhabiles (France) C Pioline	7	2	6
(Peru) P Arraya (Soviet Union) D Poliakov	3	7	6
Q	(Austria) T Prerovsky (Austria) R Wawra	6	6	4

Second round
1	(Czechoslovakia) V Flégl (Czechoslovakia) C Suk	6	7
LL	(Germany) M Joachim (Germany) Gisbert Pauli	1	5
(Uruguay) M Filippini (Argentina) A Mancini	6	4
7	(Australia) J Anderson (Italy) D Nargiso	7	6
3	(Spain) J Sánchez (France) É Winogradsky	6	7
(France) T Benhabiles (France) C Pioline	2	6
(Peru) P Arraya (Soviet Union) D Poliakov	w/o
5	(Sweden) M Gustafsson (Czechoslovakia) K Nováček

Quarterfinals
1	(Czechoslovakia) V Flégl (Czechoslovakia) C Suk	6	6	6
7	(Australia) J Anderson (Italy) D Nargiso	4	7	3
3	(Spain) J Sánchez (France) É Winogradsky	4	2
(Peru) P Arraya (Soviet Union) D Poliakov	6	6

Semifinals
1	(Czechoslovakia) V Flégl (Czechoslovakia) C Suk	4	2
(Peru) P Arraya (Soviet Union) D Poliakov	6	6

=== Bottom half ===
First round
(Romania) G Cosac (Romania) F Segărceanu	6	6
(Denmark) M Mortensen (Austria) T Muster	3	4
(Argentina) M Jaite (Spain) G López	6	7
(New Zealand) S Guy (Czechoslovakia) M Střelba	3	6
(Sweden) H Holm (Sweden) N Holm	6	3
(France) A Boetsch (France) T Champion	7	6
(Socialist Federal Republic of Yugoslavia) I Šarić (India) S Vasudevan	6	7
(Socialist Federal Republic of Yugoslavia) Željko Čiča (North Macedonia) A Kitinov	3	5

Second round
6	(Spain) T Carbonell (Spain) F Roig	6	6
(Romania) G Cosac (Romania) F Segărceanu	2	3
(Argentina) M Jaite (Spain) G López	6	3	2
4	(South Africa) D Adams (Soviet Union) A Olhovskiy	4	6	6
8	(Spain) F Clavet (Austria) H Skoff	w/o
(France) A Boetsch (France) T Champion
(Socialist Federal Republic of Yugoslavia) I Šarić (India) S Vasudevan	3	2
2	(Iran) M Bahrami (Czechoslovakia) D Vacek	6	6

Quarterfinals
6	(Spain) T Carbonell (Spain) F Roig	6	6
4	(South Africa) D Adams (Soviet Union) A Olhovskiy	4	2
8	(Spain) F Clavet (Austria) H Skoff	2	6
2	(Iran) M Bahrami (Czechoslovakia) D Vacek	6	7

Semifinals
6	(Spain) T Carbonell (Spain) F Roig	6	3	6
2	(Iran) M Bahrami (Czechoslovakia) D Vacek	3	6	3
