= 1989 Head Cup – Singles =

Singles
- 1989 Head Cup

Final
- Champion: (Spain) Emilio Sánchez
- Runner-up: (Argentina) Martín Jaite
- Score: 7–6^{(7–5)}, 6–1, 2–6, 6–2

Details
- Draw: 64 (5WC/8Q/1LL)
- Seeds: 16

Events
Singles	Doubles
- Austrian Open Kitzbühel

Kent Carlsson was the defending champion, but lost in the second round to Christian Saceanu.

Third-seeded Emilio Sánchez won the title by defeating Martín Jaite 7–6^{(7–5)}, 6–1, 2–6, 6–2 in the final.

== Seeds ==
1. (Argentina) Alberto Mancini (second round)
2. (Sweden) Kent Carlsson (second round)
3. (Spain) Emilio Sánchez (champion)
4. (Argentina) Guillermo Pérez Roldán (third round)
5. (Spain) Sergi Bruguera (quarterfinals)
6. (Austria) Horst Skoff (first round)
7. (Argentina) Martín Jaite (final)
8. (Soviet Union) Alexander Volkov (first round)
9. (n/a)
10. (Spain) Javier Sánchez (semifinals)
11. (Soviet Union) Andrei Cherkasov (second round)
12. (Mexico) Leonardo Lavalle (first round)
13. (Argentina) Horacio de la Peña (first round)
14. (Socialist Federal Republic of Yugoslavia) Goran Prpić (semifinals)
15. (Argentina) Eduardo Bengoechea (second round)
16. (Czechoslovakia) Martin Střelba (quarterfinals)

== Draw ==
Key

- Q = Qualifier
- WC = Wild card
- LL = Lucky loser
- Alt = Alternate
- ITF = ITF entry
- PR = Protected ranking
- SR = Special ranking
- SE = Special exempt
- JE = Junior exempt
- JR = Junior Accelerator Programme entrant
- CO = College Accelerator Programme entrant
- NG = Next Gen Accelerator Program entrant
- w/o = Walkover
- r = Retired
- d = Defaulted

=== Finals ===
Quarterfinals
(Spain) Francisco Clavet	6	3
7	(Argentina) Martín Jaite	7	6
14	(Socialist Federal Republic of Yugoslavia) Goran Prpić	6	6
(Czechoslovakia) Marián Vajda	0	1
5	(Spain) Sergi Bruguera	3	2
3	(Spain) Emilio Sánchez	6	6
10	(Spain) Javier Sánchez	4	6	6
16	(Czechoslovakia) Martin Střelba	6	3	4

Semifinals
7	(Argentina) Martín Jaite	0	6	6
14	(Socialist Federal Republic of Yugoslavia) Goran Prpić	6	4	3
3	(Spain) Emilio Sánchez	6	6
10	(Spain) Javier Sánchez	1	4

Final
7	(Argentina) Martín Jaite	6^{5}	1	6	2
3	(Spain) Emilio Sánchez	7^{7}	6	2	6

=== Top half ===
==== Section 1 ====
First round
1	(Argentina) A Mancini	6	6	6
Q	(Czechoslovakia) R Vogel	2	7	3
WC	(Austria) T Buchmayer	1	6	6
(Spain) T Carbonell	6	3	0
(Spain) F Clavet	6	6
(Czechoslovakia) C Suk	3	3
(Switzerland) C Mezzadri	3	2
15	(Argentina) E Bengoechea	6	6
LL	(India) S Vasudevan	4	6	2
(Czechoslovakia) P Korda	6	4	6
(Spain) JC Báguena	4	7	4
(Czechoslovakia) T Šmíd	6	6	6
(Mexico) J Lozano	5	6	6
(Argentina) G Giussani	7	3	7
(Argentina) M Ingaramo	2	1
7	(Argentina) M Jaite	6	6

Second round
1	(Argentina) A Mancini	4	6	2
WC	(Austria) T Buchmayer	6	2	6
(Spain) F Clavet	6	6
15	(Argentina) E Bengoechea	2	3
(Czechoslovakia) P Korda	6	6
(Czechoslovakia) T Šmíd	1	2
(Argentina) G Giussani	3	3
7	(Argentina) M Jaite	6	6

Third round
WC	(Austria) T Buchmayer	2	2
(Spain) F Clavet	6	6
(Czechoslovakia) P Korda	4	3
7	(Argentina) M Jaite	6	6

Quarterfinals
(Spain) F Clavet	6	3
7	(Argentina) M Jaite	7	6

==== Section 2 ====
First round
4	(Argentina) G Pérez Roldán	6	6
(Spain) J Colás	3	3
WC	(Austria) Harald Mair	6	6
(Ecuador) R Viver	3	3
(Austria) A Antonitsch	6	3	2
(Italy) S Colombo	2	6	6
(Austria) G Schaller	0	4
14	(Socialist Federal Republic of Yugoslavia) G Prpić	6	6
11	(Soviet Union) A Cherkasov	6	6
Q	(Spain) V Solves	2	4
(Czechoslovakia) L Němeček	6	6
Q	(France) R Gilbert	4	2
WC	(Austria) H Priller	0	0
(Spain) F Luna	6	6
(Czechoslovakia) M Vajda	7	2	6
6/WC	(Austria) H Skoff	5	6	4

Second round
4	(Argentina) G Pérez Roldán	6	6
WC	(Austria) Harald Mair	0	3
(Italy) S Colombo	6	3	6
14	(Socialist Federal Republic of Yugoslavia) G Prpić	3	6	7
11	(Soviet Union) A Cherkasov	1	6
(Czechoslovakia) L Němeček	6	7
(Spain) F Luna	5	1
(Czechoslovakia) M Vajda	7	6

Third round
4	(Argentina) G Pérez Roldán	4	6	3
14	(Socialist Federal Republic of Yugoslavia) G Prpić	6	4	6
(Czechoslovakia) L Němeček	2	2
(Czechoslovakia) M Vajda	6	6

Quarterfinals
14	(Socialist Federal Republic of Yugoslavia) G Prpić	6	6
(Czechoslovakia) M Vajda	0	1

=== Bottom half ===
==== Section 3 ====
First round
5	(Spain) S Bruguera	6	6
(Socialist Federal Republic of Yugoslavia) M Ostoja	2	0
(Peru) A Aramburú	6	1	4
(Italy) M Cierro	2	6	6
(Italy) F Cancellotti	6	7
Q	(Italy) R Furlan	4	6
(Argentina) R Azar	6	3	6
12	(Mexico) L Lavalle	3	6	3
13	(Argentina) H de la Peña	4	4
(Spain) J Aguilera	6	6
(Czechoslovakia) J Bulant	2	0
(Italy) C Pistolesi	6	6
WC	(Czechoslovakia) V Flégl	3	4
(Argentina) F Davín	6	6
(United States) L Duncan	1	1
3	(Spain) E Sánchez	6	6

Second round
5	(Spain) S Bruguera	6	6
(Italy) M Cierro	2	3
(Italy) F Cancellotti	7	3	6
(Argentina) R Azar	6	6	7
(Spain) J Aguilera	7	6
(Italy) C Pistolesi	5	1
(Argentina) F Davín	3	3
3	(Spain) E Sánchez	6	6

Third round
5	(Spain) S Bruguera	6	6
(Argentina) R Azar	4	1
(Spain) J Aguilera	4	2
3	(Spain) E Sánchez	6	6

Quarterfinals
5	(Spain) S Bruguera	3	2
3	(Spain) E Sánchez	6	6

==== Section 4 ====
First round
8	(Soviet Union) A Volkov	4	7	1
Q	(Iran) M Bahrami	6	5	6
Q	(Chile) R Gajardo	1	6	6
(Soviet Union) A Olhovskiy	6	1	3
Q	(Austria) M Schäffl	4	1
(Spain) F Roig	6	6
Q	(Spain) J Clavet	1	2
10	(Spain) J Sánchez	6	6
16	(Czechoslovakia) M Střelba	6	6
(Spain) S Casal	3	3
(Argentina) R Argüello	5	6	6
(Spain) C Costa	7	4	7
(Austria) S Lochbihler	2	4
(West Germany) C Saceanu	6	6
(Uruguay) D Pérez	5	6	2
2	(Sweden) K Carlsson	7	1	6

Second round
Q	(Iran) M Bahrami	4	6	6
Q	(Chile) R Gajardo	6	4	3
(Spain) F Roig	6	3	6
10	(Spain) J Sánchez	4	6	7
16	(Czechoslovakia) M Střelba	6	6
(Spain) C Costa	1	2
(West Germany) C Saceanu	6	6
2	(Sweden) K Carlsson	4	4

Third round
Q	(Iran) M Bahrami	4	6
10	(Spain) J Sánchez	6	7
16	(Czechoslovakia) M Střelba	6	6
(West Germany) C Saceanu	3	1

Quarterfinals
10	(Spain) J Sánchez	4	6	6
16	(Czechoslovakia) M Střelba	6	3	4
