= 1996 Wimbledon Championships – Men's doubles qualifying =

Men's doubles qualifying
- 1996 Wimbledon Championships

Events
Singles	men	women		boys	girls
Doubles	men	women	mixed	boys	girls
WC Singles	men	women	quad
WC Doubles	men	women	quad
Legends	men	women	seniors

Qualification
Singles	men	women
Doubles	men	women
- Wimbledon Championships

Players and pairs who neither have high enough rankings nor receive wild cards may participate in a qualifying tournament held one week before the annual Wimbledon Tennis Championships.

== Seeds ==
1. (United States) Ivan Baron / (India) Mahesh Bhupathi (second round)
2. (Israel) Noam Behr / (Belgium) Dick Norman (second round)
3. n/a
4. (France) Lionel Barthez / (Latvia) Ģirts Dzelde (first round)
5. (United States) Geoff Grant / (Ivory Coast) Claude N'Goran (second round)
6. (United States) David DiLucia / (United States) Scott Humphries (qualified)

== Qualifiers ==
1. (North Macedonia) Aleksandar Kitinov / (Austria) Gerald Mandl
2. (Italy) Massimo Ardinghi / (Italy) Nicola Bruno
3. (United States) David DiLucia / (United States) Scott Humphries

== Qualifying draw ==
=== First qualifier ===
First round
1	(United States) Ivan Baron (India) Mahesh Bhupathi	6	7
(South Africa) Neville Godwin (South Africa) David Nainkin	4	5
Alt	(India) Gaurav Natekar (Ghana) Frank Ofori	6	4
(Germany) Sascha Bandermann (Romania) Andrei Pavel	7	6
(United States) Brett Dickinson (Finland) Tuomas Ketola	2	6
(North Macedonia) Aleksandar Kitinov (Austria) Gerald Mandl	6	7
(Australia) Ben Ellwood (Australia) Jamie Holmes	6	7
4	(France) Lionel Barthez (Latvia) Ģirts Dzelde	4	6

Second round
1	(United States) Ivan Baron (India) Mahesh Bhupathi	4	6	3
(Germany) Sascha Bandermann (Romania) Andrei Pavel	6	2	6
(North Macedonia) Aleksandar Kitinov (Austria) Gerald Mandl	6	5	8
(Australia) Ben Ellwood (Australia) Jamie Holmes	4	7	6

Qualifying competition
(Germany) Sascha Bandermann (Romania) Andrei Pavel	7^{7}	6^{6}	7^{7}	3	4
(North Macedonia) Aleksandar Kitinov (Austria) Gerald Mandl	6^{5}	7^{8}	6^{3}	6	6

=== Second qualifier ===
First round
2	(Israel) Noam Behr (Belgium) Dick Norman	6	7
(United States) Jon Leach (Italy) Mosé Navarra	2	5
(Italy) Massimo Ardinghi (Italy) Nicola Bruno	6	6
WC	(United Kingdom) Gregg Saffery (United Kingdom) Michael Wyeth	2	4
(Netherlands) Eddy Bank (Netherlands) Huib Troost	6	6	7
(Austria) Georg Blumauer (Republic of Ireland) Owen Casey	7	4	9
(Belarus) Max Mirnyi (Uzbekistan) Oleg Ogorodov	4	4
5	(United States) Geoff Grant (Ivory Coast) Claude N'Goran	6	6

Second round
2	(Israel) Noam Behr (Belgium) Dick Norman	4	3
(Italy) Massimo Ardinghi (Italy) Nicola Bruno	6	6
(Austria) Georg Blumauer (Republic of Ireland) Owen Casey	7	7
5	(United States) Geoff Grant (Ivory Coast) Claude N'Goran	6	6

Qualifying competition
(Italy) Massimo Ardinghi (Italy) Nicola Bruno	6	6	6
(Austria) Georg Blumauer (Republic of Ireland) Owen Casey	4	4	2

=== Third qualifier ===
First round
Alt	(Argentina) Francisco Yunis (Argentina) Andrés Zingman	3	0
(United States) Chad Clark (United States) Keith Evans	6	6
(Australia) Grant Doyle (United States) Doug Flach	6	6
(Italy) Davide Sanguinetti (Italy) Vincenzo Santopadre	3	3
(Israel) Eyal Erlich (South Africa) Chris Haggard	6	5	6
(The Bahamas) Roger Smith (Kenya) Paul Wekesa	3	7	4
WC	(United Kingdom) Tom Hand (United Kingdom) Kyle Spencer	3	4
6	(United States) David DiLucia (United States) Scott Humphries	6	6

Second round
(United States) Chad Clark (United States) Keith Evans	6	6	10
(Australia) Grant Doyle (United States) Doug Flach	3	7	12
(Israel) Eyal Erlich (South Africa) Chris Haggard	3	7	14
6	(United States) David DiLucia (United States) Scott Humphries	6	5	16

Qualifying competition
(Australia) Grant Doyle (United States) Doug Flach	7	3	6^{3}	3
6	(United States) David DiLucia (United States) Scott Humphries	5	6	7^{7}	6
