= 1988 Head Cup – Singles =

Singles
- 1988 Head Cup

Final
- Champion: (Sweden) Kent Carlsson
- Runner-up: (Spain) Emilio Sánchez
- Score: 6–1, 6–1, 4–6, 4–6, 6–3

Details
- Draw: 64 (5WC/8Q/1LL)
- Seeds: 16

Events
Singles	Doubles
- Austrian Open Kitzbühel

Emilio Sánchez was the defending champion, but lost in the final to Kent Carlsson. The score was 6–1, 6–1, 4–6, 4–6, 6–3.

== Seeds ==
1. (France) Henri Leconte (third round)
2. (Argentina) Guillermo Pérez Roldán (semifinals)
3. (Sweden) Kent Carlsson (champion)
4. (Spain) Emilio Sánchez (final)
5. (Argentina) Martín Jaite (second round)
6. (Austria) Thomas Muster (quarterfinals)
7. (Sweden) Joakim Nyström (first round)
8. (Haiti) Ronald Agénor (first round)
9. (Brazil) Luiz Mattar (semifinals)
10. (Spain) Jordi Arrese (quarterfinals)
11. (Czechoslovakia) Tomáš Šmíd (third round)
12. (West Germany) Eric Jelen (second round)
13. (Czechoslovakia) Milan Šrejber (third round)
14. (Australia) Mark Woodforde (first round)
15. (Argentina) Alberto Mancini (quarterfinals)
16. (United States) Lawson Duncan (first round)

== Draw ==
Key

- Q = Qualifier
- WC = Wild card
- LL = Lucky loser
- Alt = Alternate
- ITF = ITF entry
- PR = Protected ranking
- SR = Special ranking
- SE = Special exempt
- JE = Junior exempt
- JR = Junior Accelerator Programme entrant
- CO = College Accelerator Programme entrant
- NG = Next Gen Accelerator Program entrant
- w/o = Walkover
- r = Retired
- d = Defaulted

=== Finals ===
Quarterfinals
15	(Argentina) Alberto Mancini	5	3
9	(Brazil) Luiz Mattar	7	6
4	(Spain) Emilio Sánchez	6	6	6
6	(Austria) Thomas Muster	1	7	4
(Czechoslovakia) Marián Vajda	2	4
3	(Sweden) Kent Carlsson	6	6
10	(Spain) Jordi Arrese	4	6	0
2	(Argentina) Guillermo Pérez Roldán	6	4	6

Semifinals
9	(Brazil) Luiz Mattar	3	4
4	(Spain) Emilio Sánchez	6	6
3	(Sweden) Kent Carlsson	6	2	6
2	(Argentina) Guillermo Pérez Roldán	4	6	4

Final
4	(Spain) Emilio Sánchez	1	1	6	6	3
3	(Sweden) Kent Carlsson	6	6	4	4	6

=== Top half ===
==== Section 1 ====
First round
1	(France) H Leconte	7	6
(West Germany) M Rackl	6	4
(West Germany) CU Steeb	1	6
(Uruguay) M Filippini	6	7
(West Germany) T Meinecke	3	6	3
(West Germany) R Osterthun	6	3	6
(Austria) H Skoff	4	6	3
15	(Argentina) A Mancini	6	1	6
9	(Brazil) L Mattar	6	6
WC	(Austria) O Fuchs	1	2
Q	(Romania) F Segărceanu	7	2	4
Q	(Sweden) P Henricsson	6	6	6
Q	(Australia) R Barlow	0	4
(Czechoslovakia) L Pimek	6	6
(Argentina) F Davín	6	6
7	(Sweden) J Nyström	2	4

Second round
1	(France) H Leconte	6	6
(Uruguay) M Filippini	2	2
(West Germany) R Osterthun	6	3
15	(Argentina) A Mancini	7	6
9	(Brazil) L Mattar	6	3	7
Q	(Sweden) P Henricsson	3	6	6
(Czechoslovakia) L Pimek	1	3
(Argentina) F Davín	6	6

Third round
1	(France) H Leconte	1	1
15	(Argentina) A Mancini	6	6
9	(Brazil) L Mattar	6	6
(Argentina) F Davín	3	3

Quarterfinals
15	(Argentina) A Mancini	5	3
9	(Brazil) L Mattar	7	6

==== Section 2 ====
First round
4	(Spain) E Sánchez	6	6
WC	(Austria) A Antonitsch	1	4
(Italy) F Cancellotti	4	6	6
WC	(Austria) T Buchmayer	6	2	2
(Czechoslovakia) P Korda	6	4	4
(Argentina) C Miniussi	3	6	6
(Spain) J Sánchez	6	3	4
13	(Czechoslovakia) M Šrejber	1	6	6
12	(West Germany) E Jelen	4	7	6
(Japan) S Matsuoka	6	6	2
(Italy) C Pistolesi	3	6	7
Q	(West Germany) P Vojtíšek	6	1	6
(Peru) P Arraya	6	4
LL	(Sweden) T Haldin	7	6
(West Germany) H Schwaier	6	3	2
6	(Austria) T Muster	3	6	6

Second round
4	(Spain) E Sánchez	6	6
(Italy) F Cancellotti	4	2
(Argentina) C Miniussi	1	5
13	(Czechoslovakia) M Šrejber	6	7
12	(West Germany) E Jelen	3	4
(Italy) C Pistolesi	6	6
LL	(Sweden) T Haldin	1	0
6	(Austria) T Muster	6	6

Third round
4	(Spain) E Sánchez	6	6
13	(Czechoslovakia) M Šrejber	4	1
(Italy) C Pistolesi	4	1
6	(Austria) T Muster	6	6

Quarterfinals
4	(Spain) E Sánchez	6	6	6
6	(Austria) T Muster	1	7	4

=== Bottom half ===
==== Section 3 ====
First round
5	(Argentina) M Jaite	6	5	6
(France) J Potier	3	7	0
(Czechoslovakia) M Vajda	7	6
(Socialist Federal Republic of Yugoslavia) B Orešar	6	2
(Israel) G Bloom	6	6
(Chile) P Rebolledo	4	2
WC	(Sweden) N Utgren	2	1
11	(Czechoslovakia) T Šmíd	6	6
14	(Australia) M Woodforde	6	2	2
Q	(Poland) W Kowalski	2	6	6
(Spain) S Casal	6	6
(Czechoslovakia) B Stankovič	3	1
WC	(Austria) H Priller	6	6	3
(Italy) M Narducci	4	7	6
(France) T Champion	1	1
3	(Sweden) K Carlsson	6	6

Second round
5	(Argentina) M Jaite	6	6	2
(Czechoslovakia) M Vajda	2	7	6
(Israel) G Bloom	5	6	2
11	(Czechoslovakia) T Šmíd	7	3	6
Q	(Poland) W Kowalski	2	5
(Spain) S Casal	6	7
(Italy) M Narducci	1	1
3	(Sweden) K Carlsson	6	6

Third round
(Czechoslovakia) M Vajda	7	6
11	(Czechoslovakia) T Šmíd	6	2
(Spain) S Casal	2	2
3	(Sweden) K Carlsson	6	6

Quarterfinals
(Czechoslovakia) M Vajda	2	4
3	(Sweden) K Carlsson	6	6

==== Section 4 ====
First round
8	(Haiti) R Agénor	4	2
(Argentina) G Vilas	6	6
Q	(Spain) J Aguilera	7	6
(West Germany) D Keretić	5	3
Q	(West Germany) A Maurer	6	6
(Sweden) P Lindgren	1	1
(Spain) A Tous	4	0
10	(Spain) J Arrese	6	6
16	(United States) L Duncan	4	4
(Spain) F Luna	6	6
Q	(Sweden) C Allgårdh	6	6
(Czechoslovakia) J Navrátil	3	2
(Spain) T Carbonell	7	4	6
(West Germany) U Riglewski	5	6	3
(Argentina) E Bengoechea	6	6	1
2	(Argentina) G Pérez Roldán	7	2	6

Second round
(Argentina) G Vilas	6	1
Q	(Spain) J Aguilera	7	6
Q	(West Germany) A Maurer	5	4
10	(Spain) J Arrese	7	6
(Spain) F Luna	4	6	3
Q	(Sweden) C Allgårdh	6	2	6
(Spain) T Carbonell	3	4
2	(Argentina) G Pérez Roldán	6	6

Third round
Q	(Spain) J Aguilera	3	6	3
10	(Spain) J Arrese	6	4	6
Q	(Sweden) C Allgårdh	4	1
2	(Argentina) G Pérez Roldán	6	6

Quarterfinals
10	(Spain) J Arrese	4	6	0
2	(Argentina) G Pérez Roldán	6	4	6
