= 1990 Philips Austrian Open – Singles =

Singles
- 1990 Philips Austrian Open

Final
- Champion: (Argentina) Horacio de la Peña
- Runner-up: (Czechoslovakia) Karel Nováček
- Score: 6–4, 7–6^{(7–4)}, 2–6, 6–2

Details
- Draw: 48 (4WC/6Q/1SE)
- Seeds: 16

Events
Singles	Doubles
- Austrian Open Kitzbühel

Emilio Sánchez was the defending champion, but lost in the semifinal to Horacio de la Peña.

Unseeded De la Peña won the title, by defeating Karel Nováček 6–4, 7–6^{(7–4)}, 2–6, 6–2 in the final.

== Seeds ==
All seeds received a bye to the second round.

1. (West Germany) Boris Becker (quarterfinals)
2. (United States) Brad Gilbert (second round)
3. (Spain) Emilio Sánchez (semifinals)
4. (Austria) Thomas Muster (quarterfinals)
5. (Switzerland) Marc Rosset (third round)
6. (Austria) Horst Skoff (semifinals)
7. (Czechoslovakia) Karel Nováček (final)
8. (Spain) Sergi Bruguera (quarterfinals)
9. (Spain) Javier Sánchez (third round)
10. (Austria) Alex Antonitsch (third round)
11. (Soviet Union) Andrei Cherkasov (quarterfinals)
12. (Spain) Tomás Carbonell (third round)
13. (West Germany) Udo Riglewski (third round)
14. (Czechoslovakia) Marián Vajda (third round)
15. (Czechoslovakia) Martin Střelba (third round)
16. (Sweden) David Engel (third round)

== Draw ==
Key

- Q = Qualifier
- WC = Wild card
- LL = Lucky loser
- Alt = Alternate
- ITF = ITF entry
- PR = Protected ranking
- SR = Special ranking
- SE = Special exempt
- JE = Junior exempt
- JR = Junior Accelerator Programme entrant
- CO = College Accelerator Programme entrant
- NG = Next Gen Accelerator Program entrant
- w/o = Walkover
- r = Retired
- d = Defaulted

=== Finals ===
Quarterfinals
1	(West Germany) Boris Becker	3	3
7	(Czechoslovakia) Karel Nováček	6	6
4	(Austria) Thomas Muster	4	2
6	(Austria) Horst Skoff	6	6
11	(Soviet Union) Andrei Cherkasov	1	4
3	(Spain) Emilio Sánchez	6	6
8	(Spain) Sergi Bruguera	4	1
(Argentina) Horacio de la Peña	6	6

Semifinals
7	(Czechoslovakia) Karel Nováček	6	4	6
6	(Austria) Horst Skoff	4	6	4
3	(Spain) Emilio Sánchez	5	6^{5}
(Argentina) Horacio de la Peña	7	7^{7}

Final
7	(Czechoslovakia) Karel Nováček	4	6^{4}	6	2
(Argentina) Horacio de la Peña	6	7^{7}	2	6

=== Top half ===
==== Section 1 ====
First round
(Italy) C Pistolesi	7	3	7
Q	(Czechoslovakia) B Stankovič	6	6	6
WC	(Austria) G Mandl	4	5
(West Germany) P Baur	6	7
(France) G Raoux	7	6	6
(Italy) S Colombo	6	7	7
(Argentina) C Miniussi	1	6	3
(Italy) M Cierro	6	4	6

Second round
1	(West Germany) B Becker	6	6
(Italy) C Pistolesi	2	1
(West Germany) P Baur	2	2
16	(Sweden) D Engel	6	6
10	(Austria) A Antonitsch	4	6	7
(Italy) S Colombo	6	3	6
(Italy) M Cierro	4	4
7	(Czechoslovakia) K Nováček	6	6

Third round
1	(West Germany) B Becker	6	4	6
16	(Sweden) D Engel	4	6	0
10	(Austria) A Antonitsch	3	7	4
7	(Czechoslovakia) K Nováček	6	6	6

Quarterfinals
1	(West Germany) B Becker	3	3
7	(Czechoslovakia) K Nováček	6	6

==== Section 2 ====
First round
(Spain) F Luna	6	6
WC	(Austria) T Buchmayer	4	0
(New Zealand) S Guy	6	4	1
Q	(Romania) D Pescariu	3	6	6
(Brazil) C Motta	6	6
SE	(Spain) F Clavet	3	4
(West Germany) C Saceanu	6	5	6
(West Germany) P Vojtíšek	2	7	4

Second round
4	(Austria) T Muster	6	6
(Spain) F Luna	2	4
Q	(Romania) D Pescariu	6	3
14	(Czechoslovakia) M Vajda	7	6
12	(Spain) T Carbonell	6	6
(Brazil) C Motta	2	3
(West Germany) C Saceanu	6	5	6
6	(Austria) H Skoff	4	7	7

Third round
4	(Austria) T Muster	6	6
14	(Czechoslovakia) M Vajda	3	0
12	(Spain) T Carbonell	2	0
6	(Austria) H Skoff	6	6

Quarterfinals
4	(Austria) T Muster	4	2
6	(Austria) H Skoff	6	6

=== Bottom half ===
==== Section 3 ====
First round
(Spain) M Górriz	3	6	1
(West Germany) M Sinner	6	2	6
Q	(Argentina) M Ingaramo	6	4
(West Germany) A Mronz	7	6
(West Germany) R Osterthun	3	6	6
WC	(Austria) O Fuchs	6	3	4
(West Germany) P Ballauff	3	2
(Spain) F Roig	6	6

Second round
5	(Switzerland) M Rosset	6	6
(West Germany) M Sinner	2	1
(West Germany) A Mronz	2	4
11	(Soviet Union) A Cherkasov	6	6
13	(West Germany) U Riglewski	6	6
(West Germany) R Osterthun	3	4
(Spain) F Roig	2	6	5
3	(Spain) E Sánchez	6	0	7

Third round
5	(Switzerland) M Rosset	3	3
11	(Soviet Union) A Cherkasov	6	6
13	(West Germany) U Riglewski	3	6
3	(Spain) E Sánchez	6	7

Quarterfinals
11	(Soviet Union) A Cherkasov	1	4
3	(Spain) E Sánchez	6	6

==== Section 4 ====
First round
Q	(Argentina) R Argüello	7	4	6
(Denmark) M Tauson	6	6	7
(Australia) N Borwick	3	1
(Spain) C Costa	6	6
(Socialist Federal Republic of Yugoslavia) B Orešar	6	3
Q	(Spain) G López	7	6
Q	(Mexico) F Maciel	2	6	1
(Argentina) H de la Peña	6	2	6

Second round
8	(Spain) S Bruguera	6	6
(Denmark) M Tauson	3	3
(Spain) C Costa	4	6	0
9	(Spain) J Sánchez	6	3	6
15	(Czechoslovakia) M Střelba	7	6
Q	(Spain) G López	6	2
(Argentina) H de la Peña	6	6
2/WC	(United States) B Gilbert	2	4

Third round
8	(Spain) S Bruguera	6	6
9	(Spain) J Sánchez	3	2
15	(Czechoslovakia) M Střelba	2	1
(Argentina) H de la Peña	6	6

Quarterfinals
8	(Spain) S Bruguera	4	1
(Argentina) H de la Peña	6	6
