= 1988 Head Cup – Doubles =

Doubles
- 1988 Head Cup

Final
- Champions: (Spain) Sergio Casal (Spain) Emilio Sánchez
- Runners-up: (Sweden) Joakim Nyström (Italy) Claudio Panatta
- Score: 6–4, 7–6

Details
- Draw: 32 (2WC)
- Seeds: 8

Events
| Singles | Doubles |
- Austrian Open Kitzbühel

Sergio Casal and Emilio Sánchez successfully defended their title by defeating Joakim Nyström and Claudio Panatta 6–4, 7–6 in the final.

== Seeds ==
1. (Spain) Sergio Casal / (Spain) Emilio Sánchez (champions)
2. (Czechoslovakia) Stanislav Birner / (Czechoslovakia) Tomáš Šmíd (semifinals)
3. (Sweden) Joakim Nyström / (Italy) Claudio Panatta (final)
4. (Spain) Tomás Carbonell / (Spain) Javier Sánchez (first round)
5. (Czechoslovakia) Petr Korda / (Czechoslovakia) Milan Šrejber (semifinals)
6. (Iran) Mansour Bahrami / (Czechoslovakia) Jaroslav Navrátil (quarterfinals)
7. (Argentina) Alberto Mancini / (Argentina) Christian Miniussi (first round)
8. (Uruguay) Marcelo Filippini / (Brazil) Luiz Mattar (quarterfinals)

== Draw ==
Key

- Q = Qualifier
- WC = Wild card
- LL = Lucky loser
- Alt = Alternate
- ITF = ITF entry
- PR = Protected ranking
- SR = Special ranking
- SE = Special exempt
- JE = Junior exempt
- JR = Junior Accelerator Programme entrant
- CO = College Accelerator Programme entrant
- NG = Next Gen Accelerator Program entrant
- w/o = Walkover
- r = Retired
- d = Defaulted

=== Finals ===
Semifinals
1 | (Spain) Sergio Casal (Spain) Emilio Sánchez | 6 | 4 | 6
5 | (Czechoslovakia) Petr Korda (Czechoslovakia) Milan Šrejber | 3 | 6 | 3
3 | (Sweden) Joakim Nyström (Italy) Claudio Panatta | 6 | 6
2 | (Czechoslovakia) Stanislav Birner (Czechoslovakia) Tomáš Šmíd | 3 | 3

Final
1 | (Spain) Sergio Casal (Spain) Emilio Sánchez | 6 | 7
3 | (Sweden) Joakim Nyström (Italy) Claudio Panatta | 4 | 6

=== Top half ===
First round
1 | (Spain) S Casal (Spain) E Sánchez | 6 | 6
(Australia) R Barlow (Australia) G Pfitzner | 2 | 3
(United States) L Duncan (Sweden) S Svensson | 2 | 2
(Italy) D Nargiso (Czechoslovakia) M Vajda | 6 | 6
(Peru) P Arraya (Israel) G Bloom | 3 | 5
(Poland) W Kowalski (Czechoslovakia) R Vogel | 6 | 7
(Argentina) M Jaite (Argentina) G Pérez Roldán | 6 | 7
7 | (Argentina) A Mancini (Argentina) C Miniussi | 4 | 6
4 | (Spain) T Carbonell (Spain) J Sánchez | 4 | 7 | 1
(Austria) A Antonitsch (Czechoslovakia) B Stankovič | 6 | 5 | 6
(United States) R Baxter (Czechoslovakia) L Pimek | 7 | 6
(Argentina) E Bengoechea (Argentina) M Ingaramo | 6 | 4
(Spain) J Aguilera (Spain) F Luna | 3 | 6
WC | (Austria) T Buchmayer (Austria) H Priller | 6 | 7
(Socialist Federal Republic of Yugoslavia) I Flego (Socialist Federal Republic of Yugoslavia) B Orešar | 6 | 4
5 | (Czechoslovakia) P Korda (Czechoslovakia) M Šrejber | 7 | 6

Second round
1 | (Spain) S Casal (Spain) E Sánchez | 6 | 6
(Italy) D Nargiso (Czechoslovakia) M Vajda | 3 | 4
(Poland) W Kowalski (Czechoslovakia) R Vogel | 0^{r}
(Argentina) M Jaite (Argentina) G Pérez Roldán | 3
(Austria) A Antonitsch (Czechoslovakia) B Stankovič | 1 | 6 | 6
(United States) R Baxter (Czechoslovakia) L Pimek | 6 | 3 | 4
WC | (Austria) T Buchmayer (Austria) H Priller | 3 | 4
5 | (Czechoslovakia) P Korda (Czechoslovakia) M Šrejber | 6 | 6

Quarterfinals
1 | (Spain) S Casal (Spain) E Sánchez | 5 | 7 | 6
(Argentina) M Jaite (Argentina) G Pérez Roldán | 7 | 6 | 4
(Austria) A Antonitsch (Czechoslovakia) B Stankovič | 6 | 4
5 | (Czechoslovakia) P Korda (Czechoslovakia) M Šrejber | 7 | 6

Semifinals
1 | (Spain) S Casal (Spain) E Sánchez | 6 | 4 | 6
5 | (Czechoslovakia) P Korda (Czechoslovakia) M Šrejber | 3 | 6 | 3

=== Bottom half ===
First round
6 | (Iran) M Bahrami (Czechoslovakia) J Navrátil | 6 | 6 | 7
(Austria) T Muster (Austria) H Skoff | 7 | 4 | 6
(Czechoslovakia) J Bulant (Czechoslovakia) V Flégl | 7 | 3 | 6
(Sweden) A Allgårdh (Sweden) P Henricsson | 6 | 6 | 2
(Chile) R Gajardo (Chile) M Rodríguez | 5 | 2
(Spain) J Arrese (Italy) F Cancellotti | 7 | 6
(West Germany) A Maurer (Sweden) N Utgren | 3 | 7 | 3
3 | (Sweden) J Nyström (Italy) C Panatta | 6 | 6 | 6
8 | (Uruguay) M Filippini (Brazil) L Mattar | 7 | 6
(Romania) F Segărceanu (United States) D Tarr | 6 | 2
(Italy) M Narducci (Italy) C Pistolesi | 3 | 6 | 6
WC | (Haiti) R Agénor (Morocco) Driss Ben Omar | 6 | 0 | 3
(France) T Champion (France) É Winogradsky | 6 | 6 | 6
(Japan) S Matsuoka (Chile) P Rebolledo | 7 | 2 | 3
(Argentina) R Argüello (Argentina) G Mirad | 1 | 4
2 | (Czechoslovakia) S Birner (Czechoslovakia) T Šmíd | 6 | 6

Second round
6 | (Iran) M Bahrami (Czechoslovakia) J Navrátil | 6 | 6
(Czechoslovakia) J Bulant (Czechoslovakia) V Flégl | 2 | 4
(Spain) J Arrese (Italy) F Cancellotti | 6 | 7 | 4
3 | (Sweden) J Nyström (Italy) C Panatta | 7 | 5 | 6
8 | (Uruguay) M Filippini (Brazil) L Mattar | 7 | 6
(Italy) M Narducci (Italy) C Pistolesi | 6 | 3
(France) T Champion (France) É Winogradsky | 6 | 6 | 1
2 | (Czechoslovakia) S Birner (Czechoslovakia) T Šmíd | 1 | 7 | 6

Quarterfinals
6 | (Iran) M Bahrami (Czechoslovakia) J Navrátil | 6 | 5
3 | (Sweden) J Nyström (Italy) C Panatta | 7 | 7
8 | (Uruguay) M Filippini (Brazil) L Mattar | 1 | 6
2 | (Czechoslovakia) S Birner (Czechoslovakia) T Šmíd | 6 | 7

Semifinals
3 | (Sweden) J Nyström (Italy) C Panatta | 6 | 6
2 | (Czechoslovakia) S Birner (Czechoslovakia) T Šmíd | 3 | 3
