= 1989 Head Cup =

- Date: 31 July – 6 August
- Edition: 19th
- Category: Grand Prix
- Draw: 64S / 32D
- Prize money: $300,000
- Surface: Clay / outdoor
- Location: Kitzbühel Austria
- Venue: Tennis stadium Kitzbühel

Champions

Singles
- (Spain) Emilio Sánchez

Doubles
- (Spain) Emilio Sánchez / (Spain) Javier Sánchez
| ← 1988 · | Austrian Open Kitzbühel | · 1990 → |

The 1989 Head Cup, also known as the 1989 Austrian Open Kitzbühel, was a men's tennis tournament played on outdoor clay courts that was part of the 1989 Nabisco Grand Prix. It was the 19th edition of the tournament and took place at the Tennis stadium Kitzbühel in Kitzbühel, Austria, from 31 July until 6 August 1989. Third-seeded Emilio Sánchez won the singles title.

== Finals ==
=== Singles ===
(Spain) Emilio Sánchez defeated (Argentina) Martín Jaite, 7–6^{(7–5)}, 6–1, 2–6, 6–2

- It was Sánchez' only singles title of the year and the 9th of his career.

=== Doubles ===
(Spain) Emilio Sánchez / (Spain) Javier Sánchez defeated (Czechoslovakia) Petr Korda / (Czechoslovakia) Tomáš Šmíd, 7–5, 7–6
