= 1992 Philips Head Cup – Singles =

Singles
- 1992 Philips Head Cup

Final
- Champion: (United States) Pete Sampras
- Runner-up: (Argentina) Alberto Mancini
- Score: 6–3, 7–5, 6–3

Details
- Draw: 48 (4WC/6Q)
- Seeds: 16

Events
| Singles | Doubles |
- Austrian Open Kitzbühel

Karel Nováček was the defending champion but chose to compete in Hilversum at the same week, winning the tournament.

Second-seeded Pete Sampras won the title by defeating Alberto Mancini 6–3, 7–5, 6–3 in the final. It was the first title for Sampras on clay, who will only win 3 titles on this surface in his entire career (the others were Rome in 1994 and Atlanta in 1998).

== Seeds ==
All seeds received a bye to the second round.

1. (United States) Jim Courier (second round)
2. (United States) Pete Sampras (champion)
3. (Spain) Francisco Clavet (second round)
4. (Austria) Thomas Muster (semifinals)
5. (Spain) Emilio Sánchez (quarterfinals)
6. (Commonwealth of Independent States) Andrei Cherkasov (second round)
7. (Argentina) Alberto Mancini (final)
8. (Spain) Javier Sánchez (second round)
9. (Argentina) Gabriel Markus (quarterfinals)
10. (France) Olivier Delaître (second round)
11. (Italy) Stefano Pescosolido (second round)
12. (Australia) Todd Woodbridge (second round)
13. (Brazil) Jaime Oncins (third round)
14. (Austria) Horst Skoff (second round)
15. (Spain) Tomás Carbonell (third round)
16. (Spain) Francisco Roig (second round)

== Draw ==
Key

- Q = Qualifier
- WC = Wild card
- LL = Lucky loser
- Alt = Alternate
- ITF = ITF entry
- PR = Protected ranking
- SR = Special ranking
- SE = Special exempt
- JE = Junior exempt
- JR = Junior Accelerator Programme entrant
- CO = College Accelerator Programme entrant
- NG = Next Gen Accelerator Program entrant
- w/o = Walkover
- r = Retired
- d = Defaulted

=== Finals ===
Quarterfinals
Q | (Uruguay) Diego Pérez | 3 | 4
7 | (Argentina) Alberto Mancini | 6 | 6
4/WC | (Austria) Thomas Muster | 7^{7} | 6
(Czechoslovakia) Martin Střelba | 6^{5} | 4
5 | (Spain) Emilio Sánchez | 6 | 6^{6} | 4
(Uruguay) Marcelo Filippini | 3 | 7^{8} | 6
9 | (Argentina) Gabriel Markus | 3 | 6^{4}
2 | (United States) Pete Sampras | 6 | 7^{7}

Semifinals
7 | (Argentina) Alberto Mancini | 7^{7} | 6
4/WC | (Austria) Thomas Muster | 6^{1} | 1
(Uruguay) Marcelo Filippini | 7^{7} | 3 | 0
2 | (United States) Pete Sampras | 6^{5} | 6 | 6

Final
7 | (Argentina) Alberto Mancini | 3 | 5 | 3
2 | (United States) Pete Sampras | 6 | 7 | 6

=== Top half ===
==== Section 1 ====
First round
Q | (Uruguay) D Pérez | 7^{7} | 7
(Sweden) J Apell | 6^{4} | 5
(Czechoslovakia) D Rikl | 6 | 5 | 7
Q | (Austria) R Burtscher | 3 | 7 | 5
(Italy) M Cierro | 3 | 4
(Argentina) R Azar | 6 | 6
(Germany) C Saceanu | 6 | 5 | 7^{7}
WC | (Austria) J Knowle | 4 | 7 | 6^{2}

Second round
1 | (United States) J Courier | 6 | 6^{5} | 2
Q | (Uruguay) D Pérez | 3 | 7^{7} | 6
(Czechoslovakia) D Rikl | 6 | 2 | 7
16 | (Spain) F Roig | 3 | 6 | 5
10 | (France) O Delaître | 7 | 3 | 0
(Argentina) R Azar | 5 | 6 | 6
(Germany) C Saceanu | 3 | 6 | 1
7 | (Argentina) A Mancini | 6 | 4 | 6

Third round
Q | (Uruguay) D Pérez | 6 | 6
(Czechoslovakia) D Rikl | 1 | 3
(Argentina) R Azar | 0 | 5
7 | (Argentina) A Mancini | 6 | 7

Quarterfinals
Q | (Uruguay) D Pérez | 3 | 4
7 | (Argentina) A Mancini | 6 | 6

==== Section 2 ====
First round
Q | (Czechoslovakia) B Stankovič | 6^{4} | 6 | 7
(Ukraine) A Medvedev | 7^{7} | 4 | 5
(Germany) B Karbacher | 6 | 1 | 3
(Germany) M Naewie | 3 | 6 | 6
WC | (Germany) Alexander Windisch | 3 | 2
(Argentina) H de la Peña | 6 | 6
(Spain) M Górriz | 4 | 2
(Czechoslovakia) M Střelba | 6 | 6

Second round
4/WC | (Austria) T Muster | 6 | 6
Q | (Czechoslovakia) B Stankovič | 2 | 3
(Germany) M Naewie | 1 | 6 | 6^{4}
13 | (Brazil) J Oncins | 6 | 1 | 7^{7}
11 | (Italy) S Pescosolido | 6^{2} | 1
(Argentina) H de la Peña | 7^{7} | 6
(Czechoslovakia) M Střelba | 7^{7} | 6
6/WC | (Commonwealth of Independent States) A Cherkasov | 6^{1} | 2

Third round
4/WC | (Austria) T Muster | 6 | 6
13 | (Brazil) J Oncins | 4 | 2
(Argentina) H de la Peña | 2 | 6 | 5
(Czechoslovakia) M Střelba | 6 | 3 | 7

Quarterfinals
4/WC | (Austria) T Muster | 7^{7} | 6
(Czechoslovakia) M Střelba | 6^{5} | 4

=== Bottom half ===
==== Section 3 ====
First round
(Argentina) C Miniussi | 6 | 6
(Haiti) R Agénor | 3 | 4
(Spain) JF Altur | 3 | 4
WC | (Austria) T Buchmayer | 6 | 6
(Uruguay) M Filippini | 6 | 6
(Belgium) X Daufresne | 3 | 4
(Austria) A Antonitsch | 5 | 7^{7} | 4
(Brazil) L Mattar | 7 | 6^{3} | 6

Second round
5 | (Spain) E Sánchez | 7^{11} | 6
(Argentina) C Miniussi | 6^{9} | 4
WC | (Austria) T Buchmayer | 7 | 7^{7}
12 | (Australia) T Woodbridge | 5 | 6^{2}
14 | (Austria) H Skoff | 3 | 2
(Uruguay) M Filippini | 6 | 6
(Brazil) L Mattar | 4 | 7^{7} | 6
3 | (Spain) F Clavet | 6 | 6^{2} | 4

Third round
5 | (Spain) E Sánchez | 5 | 7^{7} | 6
WC | (Austria) T Buchmayer | 7 | 6^{4} | 3
(Uruguay) M Filippini | 7 | 3 | 7^{8}
(Brazil) L Mattar | 5 | 6 | 6^{6}

Quarterfinals
5 | (Spain) E Sánchez | 6 | 6^{6} | 4
(Uruguay) M Filippini | 3 | 7^{8} | 6

==== Section 4 ====
First round
Q | (Estonia) A Võsand | 3 | 0
Q | (Commonwealth of Independent States) A Olhovskiy | 6 | 6
(France) F Fontang | 0 | 4
(Australia) R Fromberg | 6 | 6
(Germany) P Baur | 7^{8} | 6
(Argentina) F Davín | 6^{6} | 3
(Spain) G López | 6^{4} | 6 | 6
(Spain) À Corretja | 7^{7} | 3 | 2

Second round
8 | (Spain) J Sánchez | 6 | 1 | 1
Q | (Commonwealth of Independent States) A Olhovskiy | 4 | 6 | 6
(Australia) R Fromberg | 6 | 6^{4} | 4
9 | (Argentina) G Markus | 4 | 7^{7} | 6
15 | (Spain) T Carbonell | 2 | 6 | 6
(Germany) P Baur | 6 | 2 | 4
(Spain) G López | 6 | 3 | 6^{6}
2 | (United States) P Sampras | 4 | 6 | 7^{8}

Third round
Q | (Commonwealth of Independent States) A Olhovskiy | 1 | 6^{3}
9 | (Argentina) G Markus | 6 | 7^{7}
15 | (Spain) T Carbonell | 4 | 1
2 | (United States) P Sampras | 6 | 6

Quarterfinals
9 | (Argentina) G Markus | 3 | 6^{4}
2 | (United States) P Sampras | 6 | 7^{7}
