= 1990 Philips Austrian Open – Doubles =

Doubles
- 1990 Philips Austrian Open

Final
- Champions: (Spain) Javier Sánchez (France) Éric Winogradsky
- Runners-up: (Spain) Francisco Clavet (Austria) Horst Skoff
- Score: 7–6, 6–2

Details
- Draw: 24 (2WC/1Q)
- Seeds: 8

Events
Singles	Doubles
← 1989 ·	Austrian Open Kitzbühel	· 1991 →

Sergio Casal and Emilio Sánchez were the defending champions, but lost in the second round to Francisco Clavet and Horst Skoff.

Javier Sánchez and Éric Winogradsky won the title by defeating Clavet and Skoff 7–6, 6–2 in the final.

== Seeds ==
All seeds received a bye to the second round.

1. (Spain) Sergio Casal / (Spain) Emilio Sánchez (second round)
2. (Spain) Javier Sánchez / (France) Éric Winogradsky (champions)
3. (Iran) Mansour Bahrami / (Czechoslovakia) Tomáš Šmíd (second round)
4. (Czechoslovakia) Josef Čihák / (Czechoslovakia) Cyril Suk (quarterfinals)
5. (Spain) Tomás Carbonell / (Spain) Carlos Costa (second round)
6. (Spain) Sergi Bruguera / (Argentina) Horacio de la Peña (quarterfinals)
7. (Czechoslovakia) Karel Nováček / (Czechoslovakia) Marián Vajda (second round)
8. (Sweden) David Engel / (Sweden) Per Henricsson (quarterfinals)

== Draw ==
=== Key ===
- Q = Qualifier
- WC = Wild card
- LL = Lucky loser
- Alt = Alternate
- ITF = ITF entry
- PR = Protected ranking
- SR = Special ranking
- SE = Special exempt
- JE = Junior exempt
- JR = Junior Accelerator Programme entrant
- CO = College Accelerator Programme entrant
- NG = Next Gen Accelerator Program entrant
- w/o = Walkover
- r = Retired
- d = Defaulted

=== Finals ===
Semifinals
(Spain) Francisco Clavet (Austria) Horst Skoff	6	7
(Czechoslovakia) Vojtěch Flégl (Czechoslovakia) Daniel Vacek	4	5
(Czechoslovakia) Branislav Stankovič (Czechoslovakia) Richard Vogel	6	3	2
2	(Spain) Javier Sánchez (France) Éric Winogradsky	3	6	6

Final
(Spain) Francisco Clavet (Austria) Horst Skoff	6	2
2	(Spain) Javier Sánchez (France) Éric Winogradsky	7	6

=== Top half ===
First round
(Spain) F Clavet (Austria) H Skoff	6	7
Q	(Denmark) F Fetterlein (Denmark) M Tauson	1	6
WC	(West Germany) B Becker (Austria) T Muster	6	6	7
(Spain) JC Báguena (Argentina) C Miniussi	2	7	6
(Czechoslovakia) V Flégl (Czechoslovakia) D Vacek	6	6
(West Germany) P Baur (West Germany) A Mronz	4	4
(Sweden) C Allgårdh (Australia) N Borwick	7	6
(New Zealand) S Guy (India) S Vasudevan	6	3

Second round
1	(Spain) S Casal (Spain) E Sánchez	5	4
(Spain) F Clavet (Austria) H Skoff	7	6
WC	(West Germany) B Becker (Austria) T Muster	7	6
7	(Czechoslovakia) K Nováček (Czechoslovakia) M Vajda	6	3
3	(Iran) M Bahrami (Czechoslovakia) T Šmíd	4	6
(Czechoslovakia) V Flégl (Czechoslovakia) D Vacek	6	7
(Sweden) C Allgårdh (Australia) N Borwick	4	6	6
6	(Spain) S Bruguera (Argentina) H de la Peña	6	1	7

Quarterfinals
(Spain) F Clavet (Austria) H Skoff	7	3	6
WC	(West Germany) B Becker (Austria) T Muster	5	6	3
(Czechoslovakia) V Flégl (Czechoslovakia) D Vacek	6	6
6	(Spain) S Bruguera (Argentina) H de la Peña	1	4

Semifinals
(Spain) F Clavet (Austria) H Skoff	6	7
(Czechoslovakia) V Flégl (Czechoslovakia) D Vacek	4	5

=== Bottom half ===
First round
(Czechoslovakia) B Stankovič (Czechoslovakia) R Vogel	6	6
(Italy) M Cierro (Italy) S Colombo	1	2
(West Germany) U Riglewski (West Germany) C Saceanu	6	6
(Spain) D de Miguel (Mexico) L Lavalle	4	2
(Soviet Union) A Cherkasov (Soviet Union) A Olhovskiy	6	6
WC	(Austria) Harald Mair (Austria) G Mandl	3	1
(Spain) M Górriz (Spain) F Roig	6	7
(Romania) G Cosac (Romania) F Segărceanu	2	6

Second round
5	(Spain) T Carbonell (Spain) C Costa	7	3	4
(Czechoslovakia) B Stankovič (Czechoslovakia) R Vogel	6	6	6
(West Germany) U Riglewski (West Germany) C Saceanu	0^{r}
4	(Czechoslovakia) J Čihák (Czechoslovakia) C Suk	5
8	(Sweden) D Engel (Sweden) P Henricsson	6	4	6
(Soviet Union) A Cherkasov (Soviet Union) A Olhovskiy	4	6	4
(Spain) M Górriz (Spain) F Roig	2	1
2	(Spain) J Sánchez (France) É Winogradsky	6	6

Quarterfinals
(Czechoslovakia) B Stankovič (Czechoslovakia) R Vogel	6	4	7
4	(Czechoslovakia) J Čihák (Czechoslovakia) C Suk	3	6	6
8	(Sweden) D Engel (Sweden) P Henricsson	4	3
2	(Spain) J Sánchez (France) É Winogradsky	6	6

Semifinals
(Czechoslovakia) B Stankovič (Czechoslovakia) R Vogel	6	3	2
2	(Spain) J Sánchez (France) É Winogradsky	3	6	6
