= List of Austria Davis Cup team representatives =

This is a list of tennis players who have represented the Austria Davis Cup team in an official Davis Cup match. Austria have taken part in the competition since 1905.

== Players ==
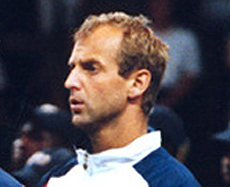
Thomas Muster

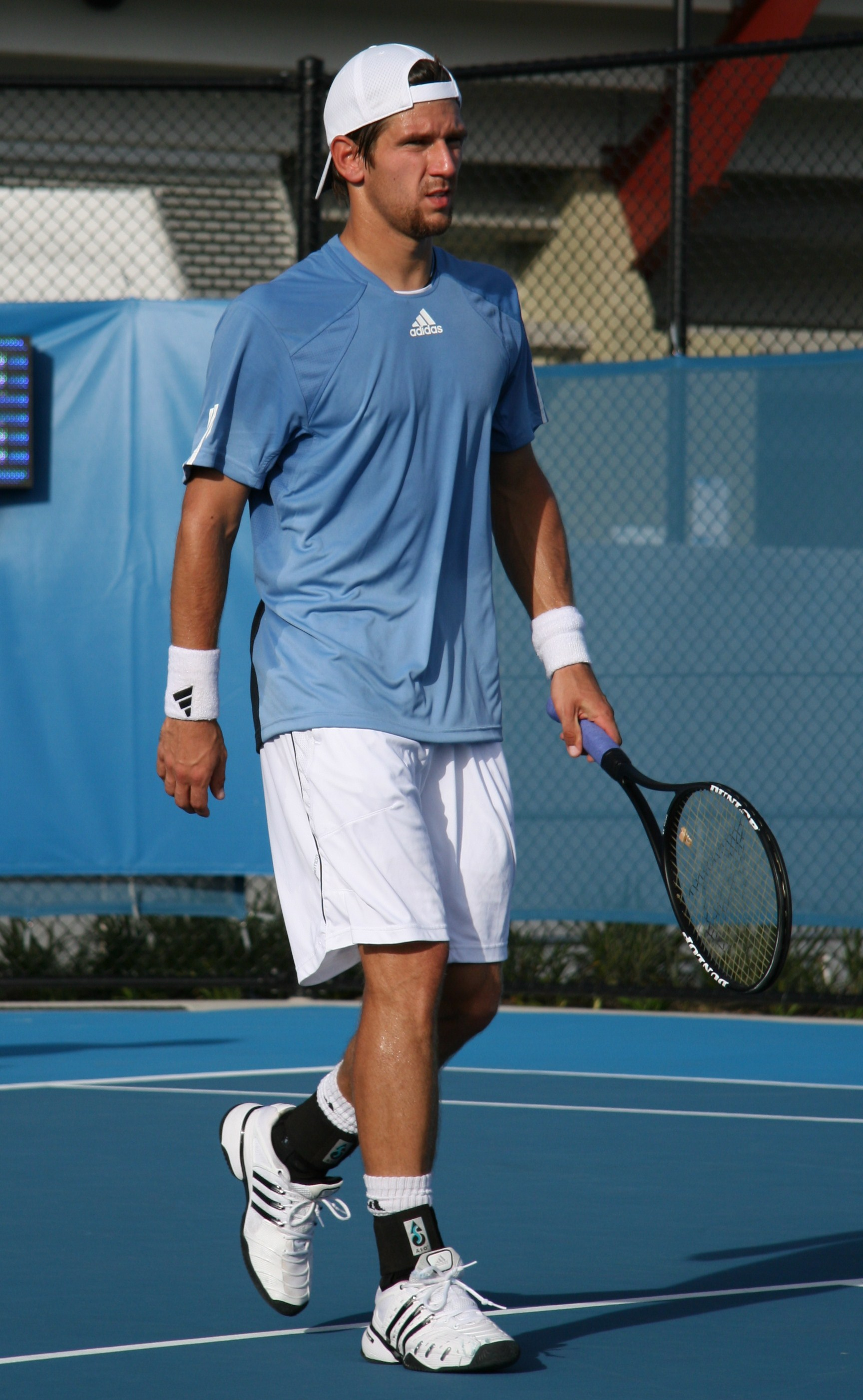
Jürgen Melzer

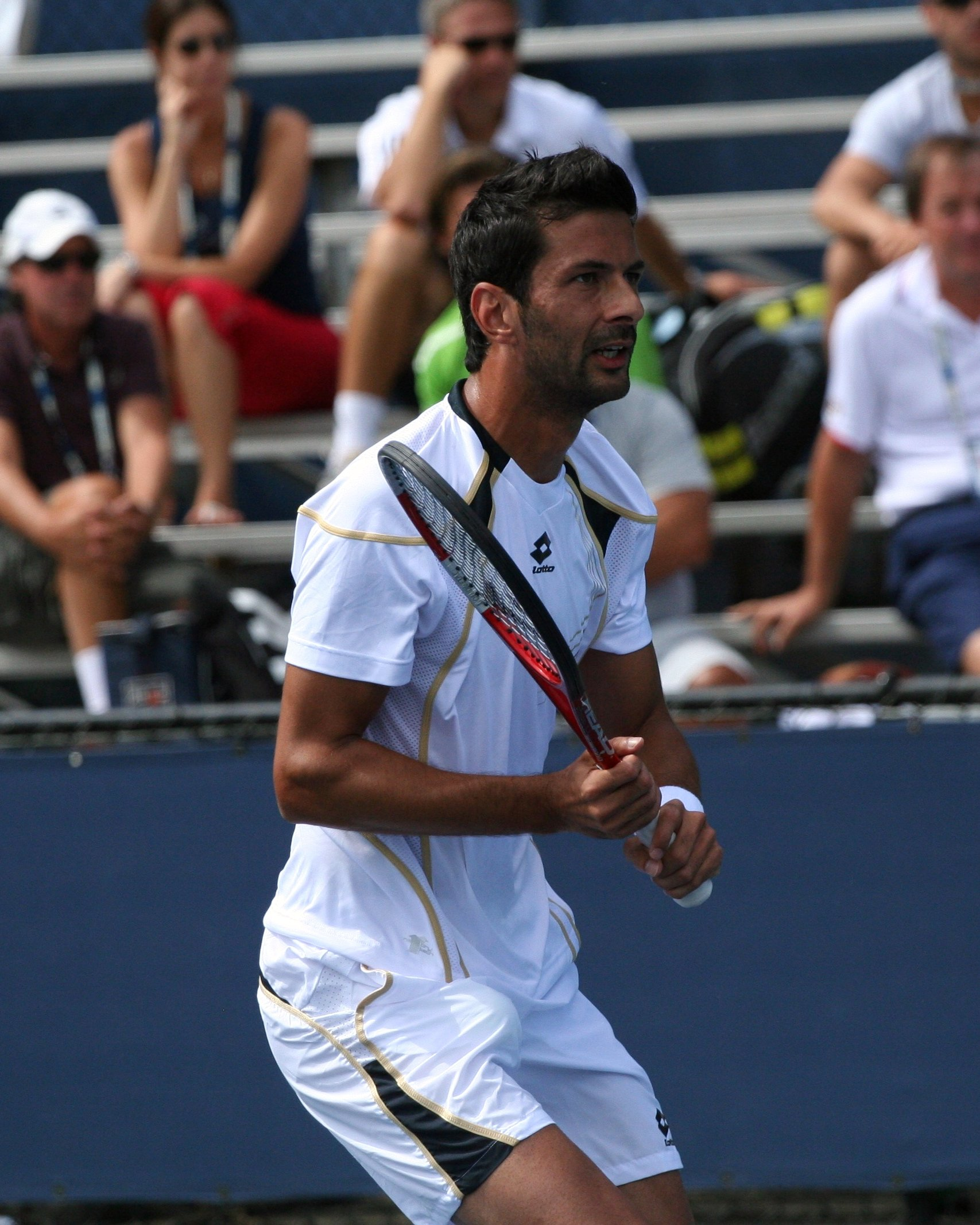
Julian Knowle

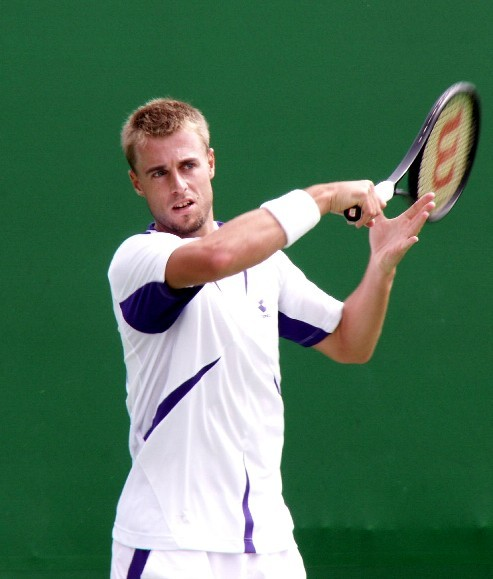
Oliver Marach

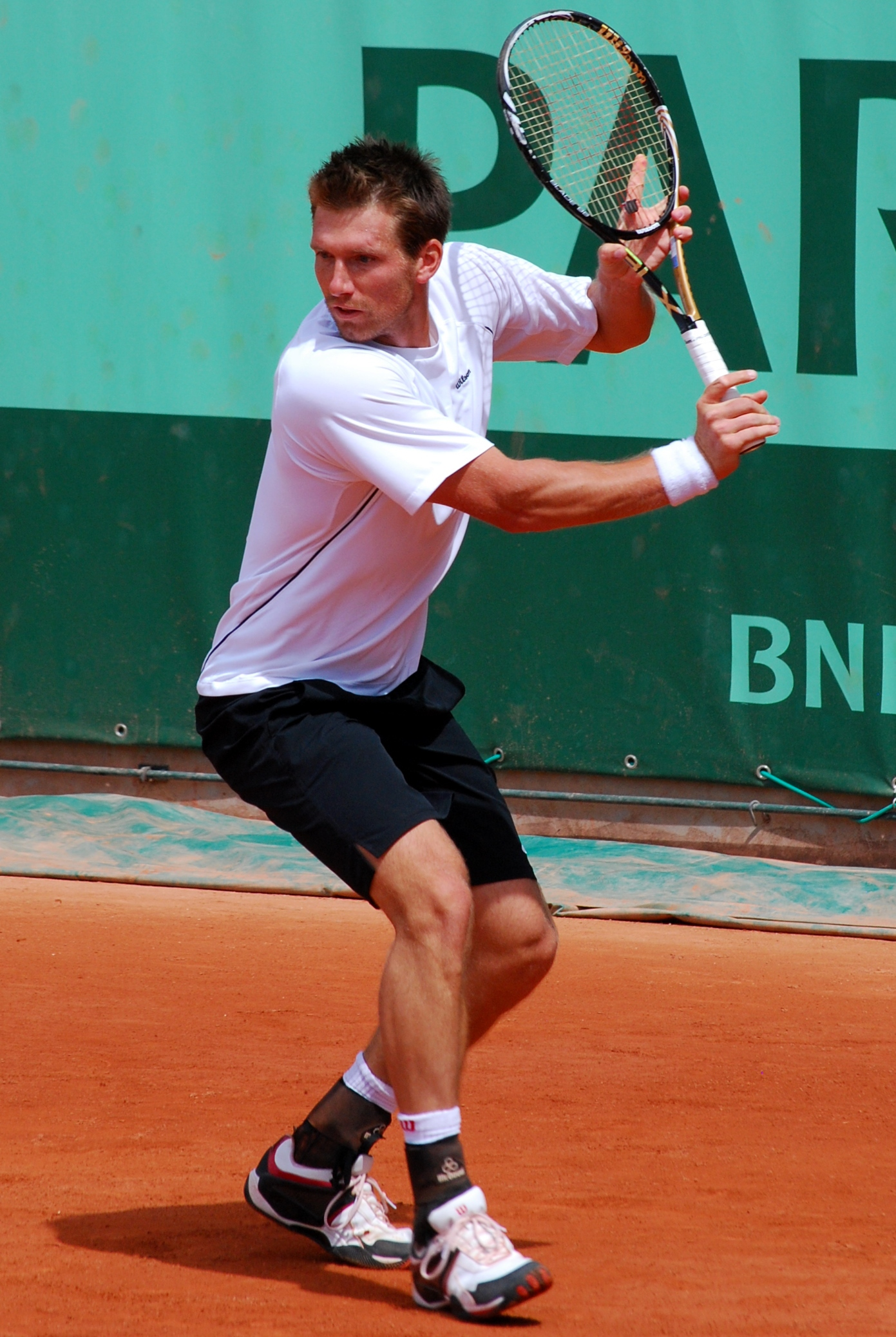
Alexander Peya

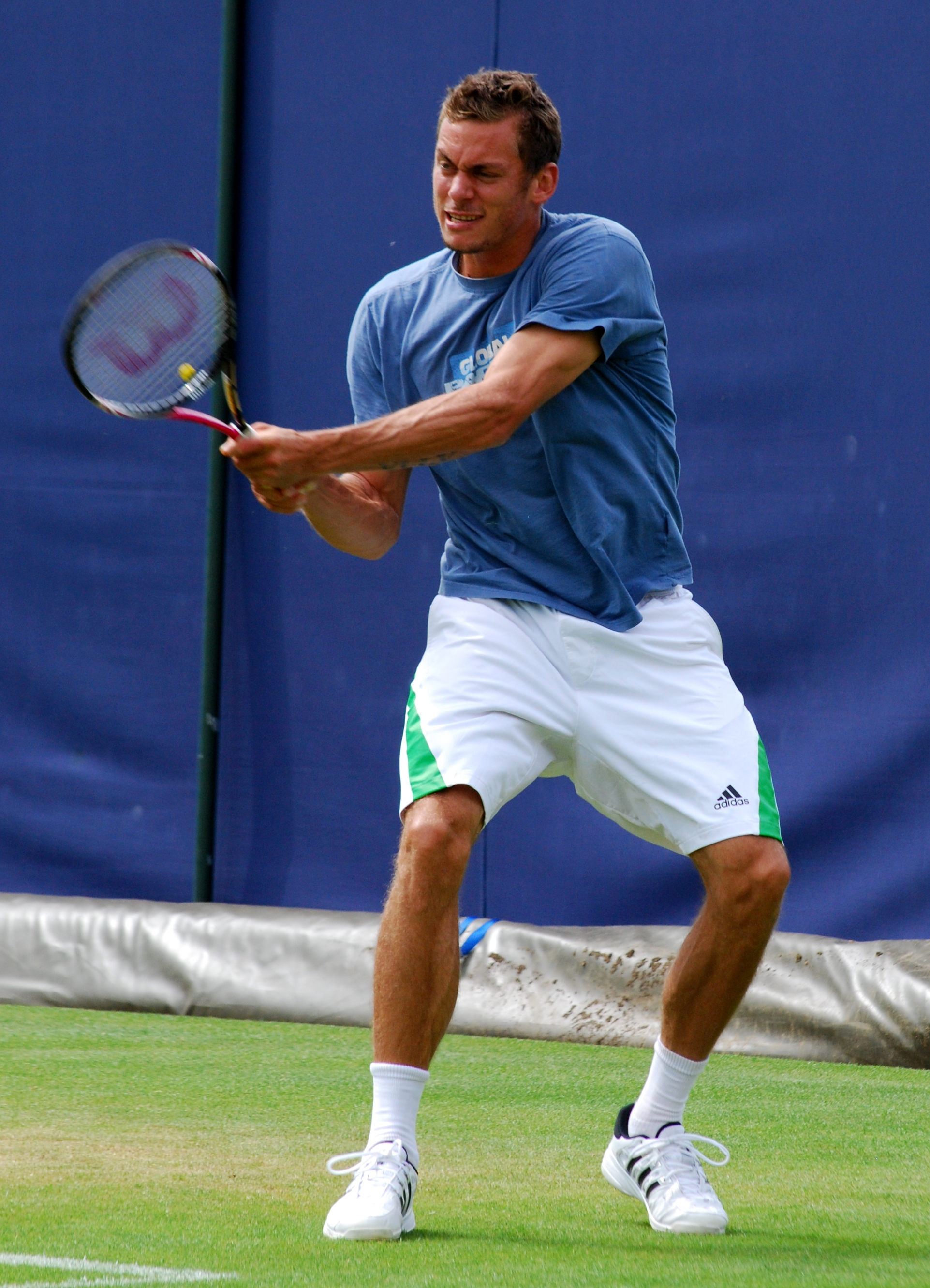
Andreas Haider-Maurer

Last updated after the 2020 Davis Cup qualifying round.

| Player | Win–loss | | | Ties | Debut |
| Player | Total | Singles | Doubles | Ties | Debut |
|---|---|---|---|---|---|
| Alex Antonitsch | 19–22 | 6–8 | 13–14 | 27 | 1984 |
| Adam Baworowski | 5–7 | 3–4 | 2–3 | 5 | 1933 |
| Ernst Blanke | 3–10 | 2–7 | 1–3 | 6 | 1964 |
| Georg Blumauer | 0–1 | 0–0 | 0–1 | 1 | 1997 |
| Peter Boeck | 0–2 | 0–0 | 0–2 | 2 | 1958 |
| Paul Brick | 2–4 | 2–3 | 0–1 | 3 | 1924 |
| Wilhelm Brosch | 1–0 | 0–0 | 1–0 | 1 | 1934 |
| Thomas Buchmayer | 1–3 | 1–1 | 0–2 | 4 | 1991 |
| Ljubomir Czajkowsky | 0–2 | 0–2 | 0–0 | 1 | 1949 |
| Rainer Eitzinger | 1–0 | 1–0 | 0–0 | 1 | 2006 |
| Werner Eschauer | 0–2 | 0–2 | 0–0 | 2 | 2007 |
| Peter Feigl | 19–18 | 12–12 | 7–6 | 15 | 1976 |
| Martin Fischer | 3–1 | 3–1 | 0–0 | 3 | 2010 |
| Konstantin Gruber | 1–0 | 1–0 | 0–0 | 1 | 2003 |
| Michael Haberl | 1–0 | 0–0 | 1–0 | 1 | 1931 |
| Andreas Haider-Maurer | 6–5 | 6–5 | 0–0 | 8 | 2010 |
| Franz Hainka | 5–9 | 3–7 | 2–2 | 9 | 1957 |
| Hans Hardwich | 0–1 | 0–0 | 0–1 | 1 | 1949 |
| Detlef Herdy | 6–12 | 3–8 | 3–4 | 8 | 1962 |
| Markus Hipfl | 10–4 | 10–4 | 0–0 | 7 | 1996 |
| Herbert Holzer | 0–1 | 0–0 | 0–1 | 1 | 1967 |
| Rudolf Hoskowetz | 0–4 | 0–1 | 0–3 | 3 | 1970 |
| Alfred Huber | 11–15 | 7–10 | 4–5 | 10 | 1950 |
| Hans-Peter Kandler | 2–2 | 2–2 | 0–0 | 2 | 1982 |
| Hans Kary | 33–25 | 22–15 | 11–10 | 26 | 1969 |
| Herbert Kinzl | 0–2 | 0–0 | 0–2 | 2 | 1932 |
| Rolf Kinzl | 0–3 | 0–2 | 0–1 | 1 | 1905 |
| Norbert Klatil | 3–2 | 2–2 | 1–0 | 2 | 1965 |
| Julian Knowle | 12–13 | 1–0 | 11–13 | 24 | 1999 |
| Daniel Köllerer | 0–2 | 0–2 | 0–0 | 1 | 2010 |
| Fritz Kolbinger | 0–1 | 0–0 | 0–1 | 1 | 1968 |
| Stefan Koubek | 20–19 | 20–19 | 0–0 | 22 | 1998 |
| Ladislav Legenstein | 9–6 | 5–4 | 4–2 | 6 | 1960 |
| Cliff Letcher | 4–4 | 2–2 | 2–2 | 4 | 1977 |
| Gerald Mandl | 2–4 | 1–2 | 1–2 | 4 | 1991 |
| Oliver Marach | 11–5 | 4–1 | 7–4 | 13 | 2003 |
| Franz-Wilhelm Matejka | 22–13 | 20–9 | 2–4 | 15 | 1927 |
| Gerald Melzer | 4–5 | 4–5 | 0–0 | 7 | 2014 |
| Jürgen Melzer | 37–41 | 22–29 | 15–12 | 38 | 1999 |
| Gerald Mild | 5–2 | 3–0 | 2–2 | 5 | 1982 |
| Marco Mirnegg | 0–1 | 0–1 | 0–0 | 1 | 2005 |
| Thomas Muster | 45–18 | 36–8 | 9–10 | 24 | 1984 |
| Dennis Novak | 8–3 | 8–3 | 0–0 | 8 | 2016 |
| Klaus Oberparleiter | 1–0 | 1–0 | 0–0 | 1 | 1983 |
| Sebastian Ofner | 0–2 | 0–2 | 0–0 | 2 | 2018 |
| Philipp Oswald | 3–2 | 0–0 | 3–2 | 5 | 2014 |
| Georg Pazderka | 2–4 | 1–3 | 1–1 | 2 | 1965 |
| Alexander Peya | 11–16 | 4–6 | 7–10 | 22 | 1999 |
| Bernhard Pils | 5–6 | 5–5 | 0–1 | 6 | 1981 |
| Udo Plamberger | 0–3 | 0–1 | 0–2 | 2 | 1996 |
| Peter Pokorny | 8–25 | 5–16 | 3–9 | 14 | 1963 |
| Thomas Přerovsky | 1–1 | 1–1 | 0–0 | 2 | 1992 |
| Robert Reininger | 7–6 | 6–5 | 1–1 | 7 | 1978 |
| Otto Relly | 0–1 | 0–0 | 0–1 | 1 | 1925 |
| Jurij Rodionov | 0–3 | 0–3 | 0–0 | 2 | 2019 |
| Franz Saiko | 22–13 | 18–8 | 4–5 | 15 | 1954 |
| Otto Salm | 0–1 | 0–0 | 0–1 | 1 | 1924 |
| Ludwig Salm-Hoogstraeten | 4–8 | 3–3 | 1–5 | 6 | 1924 |
| Gilbert Schaller | 3–6 | 3–6 | 0–0 | 7 | 1993 |
| Wolfgang Schranz | 3–3 | 2–1 | 1–2 | 4 | 1996 |
| Dieter Schultheiss | 0–6 | 0–6 | 0–0 | 4 | 1963 |
| Horst Skoff | 22–17 | 21–13 | 1–4 | 19 | 1986 |
| Gustav Specht | 0–7 | 0–6 | 0–1 | 3 | 1948 |
| Thomas Strengberger | 1–1 | 0–0 | 1–1 | 2 | 1998 |
| Dominic Thiem | 10–6 | 9–4 | 1–2 | 7 | 2014 |
| Clemens Trimmel | 0–2 | 0–1 | 0–1 | 2 | 2001 |
| Hermann von Artens | 18–22 | 14–13 | 4–9 | 15 | 1927 |
| Georg von Metaxa | 19–16 | 9–10 | 10–6 | 16 | 1934 |
| Kurt von Wessely | 0–3 | 0–2 | 0–1 | 1 | 1905 |
| Ernst Walter | 1–0 | 0–0 | 1–0 | 1 | 1973 |
| Gerhard Wimmer | 1–3 | 0–2 | 1–1 | 2 | 1973 |
| Ingo Wimmer | 1–3 | 0–2 | 1–1 | 3 | 1981 |
