= Rainer Falenti =

Austrian tennis player

- Country (sports): Austria
- Born: 15 February 1973 (age 52)
- Prize money: $47,149

Singles
- Career record: 0–1
- Highest ranking: No. 193 (28 Jul 1997)

Grand Slam singles results
- Australian Open: Q1 (1995)
- French Open: Q2 (1996)
- Wimbledon: Q1 (1996)

Doubles
- Highest ranking: No. 754 (4 Mar 1996)

Rainer Falenti (born 15 February 1973) is an Austrian former professional tennis player.

Falenti, who had a best singles world ranking of 193, made his only ATP Tour main draw appearance at the 1993 Austrian Open Kitzbühel, where he lost his first round match to Federico Sánchez.

== ITF Futures titles ==
=== Singles: (1) ===
No.	Date	Tournament	Surface	Opponent	Score
1.	Jun 1998	Hungary F1, Budapest	Clay	(Hungary) Kornél Bardóczky	6–4, 4–6, 6–4
