= Vasco Gonçalves (tennis) =

Portuguese tennis player (born 1974)

- Country (sports): Portugal
- Born: 22 January 1974 (age 51)
- Plays: Left-handed
- Prize money: $16,361

Singles
- Highest ranking: No. 368 (24 Oct 1994)

Grand Slam singles results
- Wimbledon: Q1 (1996)

Doubles
- Career record: 0–3
- Highest ranking: No. 222 (20 May 1996)

Vasco Gonçalves (born 22 January 1974) is a Portuguese former professional tennis player.

A left-handed player, Gonçalves played professional tennis in the 1990s, reaching a best singles ranking of 368 in the world. Most notably he featured in the singles qualifying draw for the 1996 Wimbledon Championships and made three ATP Tour main draw appearances in doubles. He was a two-time national champion in doubles.
