= 1991 Philips Austrian Open =

- Date: 29 July – 4 August
- Edition: 21st
- Category: ATP World Series
- Draw: 48S / 24D
- Prize money: $337,500
- Surface: Clay / outdoor
- Location: Kitzbühel, Austria
- Venue: Kitzbüheler Tennisclub

Champions

Singles
- (Czechoslovakia) Karel Nováček

Doubles
- (Spain) Tomás Carbonell / (Spain) Francisco Roig
← 1990 ·	Austrian Open Kitzbühel	· 1992 →

The 1991 Philips Austrian Open, also known as the Austrian Open Kitzbühel, was a men's tennis tournament held on outdoor clay courts at the Kitzbüheler Tennisclub in Kitzbühel, Austria that was part of the ATP World Series of the 1991 ATP Tour. It was the 21st edition of the tournament and was held from 29 July until 4 August 1991. Third-seeded Karel Nováček won the singles title.

== Finals ==
=== Singles ===
(Czechoslovakia) Karel Nováček defeated (Sweden) Magnus Gustafsson 7–6^{(7–2)}, 7–6^{(7–4)}, 6–2

- It was Nováček's 3rd singles title of the year and 6th of his career.

=== Doubles ===
(Spain) Tomás Carbonell / (Spain) Francisco Roig defeated (Peru) Pablo Arraya / (Soviet Union) Dimitri Poliakov 6–7, 6–2, 6–4
