= Georg Blumauer =

Austrian tennis player

- Full name: Georg Blumauer
- Country (sports): Austria
- Born: 16 July 1974 (age 50); Vienna, Austria
- Prize money: $40,240

Singles
- Highest ranking: No. 419 (1 April 1996)

Doubles
- Career record: 4–11
- Career titles: 0
- Highest ranking: No. 147 (26 May 1997)

Grand Slam doubles results
- Wimbledon: Q3 (1996)
- US Open: Q2 (1997)

Georg Blumauer (born 16 July 1974) is a former professional tennis player from Austria.

== Biography ==
Born in Vienna, Blumauer competed mostly as a doubles player on the professional circuit. He made the quarter-finals with Gerald Mandl at the Austrian Open Kitzbühel in 1996. It was Mandl that he partnered in his only Davis Cup appearance, a doubles loss to the Black brothers, Byron and Wayne, in a 1997 World Group qualifier against Zimbabwe in Harare. At the 1998 CA-TennisTrophy in Vienna, Blumauer and Thomas Buchmayer competed as wildcards and upset fourth seeds Donald Johnson and Francisco Montana in the first round. He won the doubles title at the 1999 Nettingsdorf Challenger, with Alexander Peya.

== Challenger titles ==
=== Doubles: (1) ===
No.	Year	Tournament	Surface	Partner	Opponents	Score
1.	1999	Nettingsdorf, Austria	Clay	(Austria) Alexander Peya	(Argentina) Marcelo Charpentier (Puerto Rico) José Frontera	6–7^{(4)}, 6–3, 7–6^{(3)}

== See also ==
- List of Austria Davis Cup team representatives
