= 1992 Philips Head Cup – Doubles =

Doubles
- 1992 Philips Head Cup

Final
- Champions: (Spain) Sergio Casal (Spain) Emilio Sánchez
- Runners-up: (Argentina) Horacio de la Peña (Czechoslovakia) Vojtěch Flégl
- Score: 6–1, 6–2

Details
- Draw: 24
- Seeds: 8

Events
Singles	Doubles
- Austrian Open Kitzbühel

Tomás Carbonell and Francisco Roig were the defending champions, but Carbonell did not compete this year. Roig teamed up with Diego Pérez and lost in the semifinals to Horacio de la Peña and Vojtěch Flégl.

Sergio Casal and Emilio Sánchez won the title by defeating De la Peña and Flégl 6–1, 6–2 in the final.

== Seeds ==
All seeds received a bye to the second round.

1. (Spain) Sergio Casal / (Spain) Emilio Sánchez (champions)
2. (South Africa) David Adams / (Russia) Andrei Olhovskiy (quarterfinals)
3. (Latvia) Ģirts Dzelde / (South Africa) Piet Norval (second round)
4. (Argentina) Pablo Albano / (Brazil) Cássio Motta (quarterfinals)
5. (Brazil) Luiz Mattar / (Brazil) Jaime Oncins (second round)
6. (Uruguay) Diego Pérez / (Spain) Francisco Roig (semifinals)
7. (Germany) Markus Naewie / (Germany) Udo Riglewski (second round)
8. (Argentina) Horacio de la Peña / (Czechoslovakia) Vojtěch Flégl (final)

== Draw ==
Key

- Q = Qualifier
- WC = Wild card
- LL = Lucky loser
- Alt = Alternate
- ITF = ITF entry
- PR = Protected ranking
- SR = Special ranking
- SE = Special exempt
- JE = Junior exempt
- JR = Junior Accelerator Programme entrant
- CO = College Accelerator Programme entrant
- NG = Next Gen Accelerator Program entrant
- w/o = Walkover
- r = Retired
- d = Defaulted

=== Finals ===
Semifinals
1	(Spain) Sergio Casal (Spain) Emilio Sánchez	4	6	7
(Sweden) Jan Apell (Sweden) Johan Donar	6	3	5
6	(Uruguay) Diego Pérez (Spain) Francisco Roig	5	5
8	(Argentina) Horacio de la Peña (Czechoslovakia) Vojtěch Flégl	7	7

Final
1	(Spain) Sergio Casal (Spain) Emilio Sánchez	6	6
8	(Argentina) Horacio de la Peña (Czechoslovakia) Vojtěch Flégl	1	2

=== Top half ===
First round
(Spain) J Burillo (Spain) J Sánchez	6	7
(Sweden) P Henricsson (Sweden) O Jonsson	3	6
(United States) M Bauer (United States) D Layendecker	6	7	7
(Italy) M Cierro (Czechoslovakia) M Střelba	7	6	6
WC	(Argentina) A Mancini (Argentina) C Miniussi	7	2	7
(Uruguay) M Filippini (Argentina) G Luza	6	6	6
(Belgium) X Daufresne (Spain) V Solves	6	3	3
(Sweden) J Apell (Sweden) J Donar	2	6	6

Second round
1	(Spain) S Casal (Spain) E Sánchez	6	6
(Spain) J Burillo (Spain) J Sánchez	2	4
(United States) M Bauer (United States) D Layendecker	6	3	6
7	(Germany) M Naewie (Germany) I Riglewski	3	6	1
4	(Argentina) P Albano (Brazil) C Motta	6	6
WC	(Argentina) A Mancini (Argentina) C Miniussi	4	4
(Sweden) J Apell (Sweden) J Donar	6	6
5	(Brazil) L Mattar (Brazil) J Oncins	4	2

Quarterfinals
1	(Spain) S Casal (Spain) E Sánchez	7	6
(United States) M Bauer (United States) D Layendecker	5	2
4	(Argentina) P Albano (Brazil) C Motta	6	3	4
(Sweden) J Apell (Sweden) J Donar	4	6	6

Semifinals
1	(Spain) S Casal (Spain) E Sánchez	4	6	7
(Sweden) J Apell (Sweden) J Donar	6	3	5

=== Bottom half ===
First round
(Czechoslovakia) D Rikl (Czechoslovakia) R Vogel	6	6	2
(Austria) A Antonitsch (Austria) H Skoff	3	7	6
(New Zealand) S Guy (United States) M Jensen	3	3
(Spain) F Clavet (Spain) M Górriz	6	6
Q	(Haiti) R Agénor (Austria) T Buchmayer	6	2
(Austria) T Muster (Italy) S Pescosolido	1	1^{r}
(Argentina) G Markus (Argentina) D Orsanic	7	3	7
(Italy) C Brandi (Italy) F Mordegan	6	6	6

Second round
6	(Uruguay) D Pérez (Spain) F Roig	w/o
(Austria) A Antonitsch (Austria) H Skoff
(Spain) F Clavet (Spain) M Górriz	3	7	7
3	(Latvia) Ģ Dzelde (South Africa) P Norval	6	5	5
8	(Argentina) H de la Peña (Czechoslovakia) V Flégl	6	7	6
Q	(Haiti) R Agénor (Austria) T Buchmayer	7	5	3
(Argentina) G Markus (Argentina) D Orsanic	3	4
2	(South Africa) D Adams (Russia) A Olhovskiy	6	6

Quarterfinals
6	(Uruguay) D Pérez (Spain) F Roig	4	6	6
(Spain) F Clavet (Spain) M Górriz	6	4	3
8	(Argentina) H de la Peña (Czechoslovakia) V Flégl	3	6	6
2	(South Africa) D Adams (Russia) A Olhovskiy	6	3	4

Semifinals
6	(Uruguay) D Pérez (Spain) F Roig	5	5
8	(Argentina) H de la Peña (Czechoslovakia) V Flégl	7	7
