= 1996 Wimbledon Championships – Women's doubles qualifying =

Women's doubles qualifying
- 1996 Wimbledon Championships

Events
Singles	men	women		boys	girls
Doubles	men	women	mixed	boys	girls
WC Singles	men	women	quad
WC Doubles	men	women	quad
Legends	men	women	seniors

Qualification
Singles	men	women
Doubles	men	women
- Wimbledon Championships

Players and pairs who neither have high enough rankings nor receive wild cards may participate in a qualifying tournament held one week before the annual Wimbledon Tennis Championships.

The qualifying tournament was held from 18 to 20 June 1996 in the England Sports Grounds in Roehampton, United Kingdom.

== Seeds ==
1. (Australia) Annabel Ellwood / (Australia) Louise Pleming (second round)
2. (France) Isabelle Demongeot / (France) Caroline Dhenin (qualified)
3. (Russia) Julia Lutrova / (Thailand) Tamarine Tanasugarn (qualifying competition, lucky losers)
4. (Australia) Danielle Jones / (South Africa) Tessa Price (qualifying competition, lucky losers)

== Qualifiers ==
1. (United Kingdom) Julie Pullin / (United Kingdom) Lorna Woodroffe
2. (France) Isabelle Demongeot / (France) Caroline Dhenin

== Lucky losers ==
1. (Russia) Julia Lutrova / (Thailand) Tamarine Tanasugarn
2. (Australia) Danielle Jones / (South Africa) Tessa Price

== Qualifying draw ==
=== First qualifier ===
First round
1	(Australia) Annabel Ellwood (Australia) Louise Pleming	6	3	6
(South Korea) Jeon Mi-ra (United States) Janet Lee	0	6	3
WC	(United Kingdom) Jasmine Choudhury (United Kingdom) Louise Latimer	1	1
(United Kingdom) Julie Pullin (United Kingdom) Lorna Woodroffe	6	6
3	(Russia) Julia Lutrova (Thailand) Tamarine Tanasugarn	7	6
(France) Karine Quentrec-Eagle (France) Anne-Gaëlle Sidot	5	2
(Hungary) Virág Csurgó (Australia) Siobhan Drake-Brockman
(United States) Laxmi Poruri (Austria) Melanie Schnell	w/o

Second round
1	(Australia) Annabel Ellwood (Australia) Louise Pleming	7	5	2
(United Kingdom) Julie Pullin (United Kingdom) Lorna Woodroffe	6	7	6
3	(Russia) Julia Lutrova (Thailand) Tamarine Tanasugarn	3	6	12
(Hungary) Virág Csurgó (Australia) Siobhan Drake-Brockman	6	4	10

Qualifying competition
(United Kingdom) Julie Pullin (United Kingdom) Lorna Woodroffe	6	7
3	(Russia) Julia Lutrova (Thailand) Tamarine Tanasugarn	4	5

=== Second qualifier ===
First round
(Spain) Gala León García (Spain) Silvia Ramón-Cortés	3	6	4
(United Kingdom) Emily Bond (United Kingdom) Amanda Janes	6	2	6
(United Kingdom) Claire Taylor (United Kingdom) Jane Wood	2	4
4	(Australia) Danielle Jones (South Africa) Tessa Price	6	6
(France) Amélie Cocheteux (Japan) Miho Saeki	6	6
(United Kingdom) Lucie Ahl (United Kingdom) Karen Cross	4	2
(Belarus) Olga Barabanschikova (San Marino) Ludmila Varmužová	2	3
2	(France) Isabelle Demongeot (France) Caroline Dhenin	6	6

Second round
(United Kingdom) Emily Bond (United Kingdom) Amanda Janes	1	2
4	(Australia) Danielle Jones (South Africa) Tessa Price	6	6
(France) Amélie Cocheteux (Japan) Miho Saeki	7	4	1
2	(France) Isabelle Demongeot (France) Caroline Dhenin	5	6	6

Qualifying competition
4	(Australia) Danielle Jones (South Africa) Tessa Price	6	4
2	(France) Isabelle Demongeot (France) Caroline Dhenin	7	6
