= 1992 Philips Head Cup =

- Date: 20–26 July
- Edition: 22nd
- Category: ATP World Series
- Draw: 48S / 24D
- Prize money: $355,000
- Surface: Clay / outdoor
- Location: Kitzbühel, Austria
- Venue: Kitzbüheler Tennisclub

Champions

Singles
- (United States) Pete Sampras

Doubles
- (Spain) Sergio Casal / (Spain) Emilio Sánchez
← 1991 ·	Austrian Open Kitzbühel	· 1993 →

The 1992 Philips Head Cup, also known as the Austrian Open Kitzbühel, was a men's tennis tournament held on outdoor clay courts at the Kitzbüheler Tennisclub in Kitzbühel, Austria that was part of the ATP World Series of the 1992 ATP Tour. It was the 22nd edition of the tournament and was held from 20 July until 26 July 1992. First-seeded Pete Sampras won the singles title.

== Finals ==
=== Singles ===
(United States) Pete Sampras defeated (Argentina) Alberto Mancini 6–3, 7–5, 6–3

- It was Sampras' 2nd singles title of the year and 10th of his career.

=== Doubles ===
(Spain) Sergio Casal / (Spain) Emilio Sánchez defeated (Argentina) Horacio de la Peña / (Czechoslovakia) Vojtěch Flégl 6–1, 6–2
