= 1990 Philips Austrian Open =

- Date: 30 July – 5 August
- Edition: 20th
- Category: ATP World Series
- Draw: 48S / 24D
- Prize money: $337,500
- Surface: Clay / outdoor
- Location: Kitzbühel, Austria
- Venue: Kitzbüheler Tennisclub

Champions

Singles
- (Argentina) Horacio de la Peña

Doubles
- (Spain) Javier Sánchez / (France) Éric Winogradsky
← 1989 ·	Austrian Open Kitzbühel	· 1991 →

The 1990 Philips Austrian Open, also known as the Austrian Open Kitzbühel, was a men's tennis tournament held on outdoor clay courts at the Kitzbüheler Tennisclub in Kitzbühel, Austria that was part of the ATP World Series of the 1990 ATP Tour. It was the 20th edition of the tournament and was held from 30 July until 5 August 1990. Unseeded Horacio de la Peña won the singles title.

== Finals ==
=== Singles ===
(Argentina) Horacio de la Peña defeated (Czechoslovakia) Karel Nováček 6–4, 7–6^{(7–4)}, 2–6, 6–2

- It was de la Peña's only singles title of the year and 3rd of his career.

=== Doubles ===
(Spain) Javier Sánchez / (France) Éric Winogradsky defeated (Spain) Francisco Clavet / (Austria) Horst Skoff 7–6, 6–2
