= 1996 Wimbledon Championships – Women's singles qualifying =

Women's singles qualifying
- 1996 Wimbledon Championships

Events
Singles	men	women		boys	girls
Doubles	men	women	mixed	boys	girls
WC Singles	men	women	quad
WC Doubles	men	women	quad
Legends	men	women	seniors

Qualification
Singles	men	women
Doubles	men	women
- Wimbledon Championships

Players and pairs who neither have high enough rankings nor receive wild cards may participate in a qualifying tournament held one week before the annual Wimbledon Tennis Championships.

The qualifying tournament was held from 18 to 20 June 1996 in the England Sports Grounds in Roehampton, United Kingdom.

== Seeds ==
1. (Italy) Flora Perfetti (qualifying competition, lucky loser)
2. (Venezuela) María Vento (first round)
3. n/a
4. (Australia) Rachel McQuillan (first round)
5. (Finland) Nanne Dahlman (second round)
6. (Poland) Aleksandra Olsza (qualifying competition, lucky loser)
7. (Australia) Annabel Ellwood (qualified)
8. (United States) Erika deLone (second round)
9. (Czech Republic) Petra Langrová (qualifying competition)
10. (United States) Laxmi Poruri (first round)
11. (Canada) Sonya Jeyaseelan (first round)
12. (France) Isabelle Demongeot (first round)
13. (Croatia) Silvija Talaja (qualifying competition)
14. (Luxembourg) Anne Kremer (qualified)
15. (Slovenia) Tina Križan (second round)
16. (Sweden) Maria Strandlund (qualifying competition)
17. (France) Caroline Dhenin (second round)

== Qualifiers ==
1. (Argentina) Mercedes Paz
2. (Australia) Annabel Ellwood
3. (Australia) Kerry-Anne Guse
4. (Luxembourg) Anne Kremer
5. (Canada) Maureen Drake
6. (Italy) Laura Golarsa
7. (France) Amélie Cocheteux
8. (Romania) Cătălina Cristea

== Lucky losers ==
1. (Italy) Flora Perfetti
2. (Poland) Aleksandra Olsza

== Qualifying draw ==
=== First qualifier ===
First round
1	(Italy) Flora Perfetti	7	6
(Australia) Catherine Barclay	6	2
(South Africa) Tessa Price	3	4
(United States) Tara Snyder	6	6
(Argentina) Mercedes Paz	6	6
(France) Karine Quentrec Eagle	3	4
(Austria) Beate Reinstadler	6	6
12	(France) Isabelle Demongeot	3	2

Second round
1	(Italy) Flora Perfetti	6	6
(United States) Tara Snyder	3	1
(Argentina) Mercedes Paz	5	7	6
(Austria) Beate Reinstadler	7	6	4

Qualifying competition
1	(Italy) Flora Perfetti	4	7	3
(Argentina) Mercedes Paz	6	5	6

=== Second qualifier ===
First round
16	(Sweden) Maria Strandlund	6	6
(South Korea) Jeon Mi-ra	2	4
(Czech Republic) Adriana Gerši	5	6
(Australia) Siobhan Drake-Brockman	7	7
(Netherlands) Caroline Vis	0	6	6
(Austria) Elisabeth Habeler	6	3	4
(Netherlands) Kim de Weille	4	1
7	(Australia) Annabel Ellwood	6	6

Second round
16	(Sweden) Maria Strandlund	6	7
(Australia) Siobhan Drake-Brockman	2	5
(Netherlands) Caroline Vis	6	3	5
7	(Australia) Annabel Ellwood	0	6	7

Qualifying competition
16	(Sweden) Maria Strandlund	3	4
7	(Australia) Annabel Ellwood	6	6

=== Third qualifier ===
First round
17	(France) Caroline Dhenin	6	6
(Italy) Gabriella Boschiero	1	1
(Australia) Kerry-Anne Guse	6	6
(Spain) Silvia Ramón-Cortés	0	1
(Slovakia) Denisa Krajčovičová	1	3
(Netherlands) Seda Noorlander	6	6
(United States) Meghann Shaughnessy	2	6	2
9	(Czech Republic) Petra Langrová	6	4	6

Second round
17	(France) Caroline Dhenin	6	2
(Australia) Kerry-Anne Guse	7	6
(Netherlands) Seda Noorlander	3	6	1
9	(Czech Republic) Petra Langrová	6	2	6

Qualifying competition
(Australia) Kerry-Anne Guse	7	3	6
9	(Czech Republic) Petra Langrová	6	6	3

=== Fourth qualifier ===
First round
14	(Luxembourg) Anne Kremer	6	7
(Belarus) Olga Barabanschikova	1	5
(Spain) Paula Hermida	3	6	1
WC	(United Kingdom) Amanda Wainwright	6	3	6
WC	(United Kingdom) Lucie Ahl	2	0
(Australia) Kristine Radford	6	6
(Russia) Julia Lutrova	4	5
6	(Poland) Aleksandra Olsza	6	7

Second round
14	(Luxembourg) Anne Kremer	6	7
WC	(United Kingdom) Amanda Wainwright	2	6
(Australia) Kristine Radford	3	6	1
6	(Poland) Aleksandra Olsza	6	0	6

Qualifying competition
14	(Luxembourg) Anne Kremer	1	6	6
6	(Poland) Aleksandra Olsza	6	4	3

=== Fifth qualifier ===
First round
8	(United States) Erika deLone	6	6
WC	(United Kingdom) Karen Cross	1	2
(San Marino) Ludmila Varmužová	3	7	7
(Canada) Maureen Drake	6	6	9
(Japan) Miho Saeki	7	6
(Japan) Haruka Inoue	5	1
WC	(United Kingdom) Emily Bond	7	6
11	(Canada) Sonya Jeyaseelan	5	1

Second round
8	(United States) Erika deLone	2	2
(Canada) Maureen Drake	6	6
(Japan) Miho Saeki	7	6
(United Kingdom) Emily Bond	6	4

Qualifying competition
(Canada) Maureen Drake	4	6	8
(Japan) Miho Saeki	6	4	6

=== Sixth qualifier ===
First round
13	(Croatia) Silvija Talaja	7	6
(Australia) Nicole Pratt	5	4
(Japan) Yuka Yoshida	7	6
Alt	(France) Sophie Georges	5	4
WC	(United States) Debbie Graham	6	6
(Hungary) Petra Gáspár	2	1
(Italy) Laura Golarsa	4	6	6
4	(Australia) Rachel McQuillan	6	4	2

Second round
13	(Croatia) Silvija Talaja	6	6
(Japan) Yuka Yoshida	0	3
WC	(United States) Debbie Graham	4	6	6
(Italy) Laura Golarsa	6	3	4

Qualifying competition
13	(Croatia) Silvija Talaja	1	2
(Italy) Laura Golarsa	6	6

=== Seventh qualifier ===
First round
5	(Finland) Nanne Dahlman	6	6
Alt	(Japan) Hiromi Nagano	4	3
(United States) Janet Lee	2	4
(Greece) Christína Papadáki	6	6
(Hungary) Virág Csurgó	1	2
WC	(United Kingdom) Julie Pullin	6	6
(France) Amélie Cocheteux	6	6
10	(United States) Laxmi Poruri	3	3

Second round
5	(Finland) Nanne Dahlman	6	3	0
(Greece) Christína Papadáki	0	6	6
WC	(United Kingdom) Julie Pullin	5	6
(France) Amélie Cocheteux	7	7

Qualifying competition
(Greece) Christína Papadáki	6	3	5
(France) Amélie Cocheteux	4	6	7

=== Eighth qualifier ===
First round
15	(Slovenia) Tina Križan	3	6	6
(Italy) Laura Garrone	6	2	3
WC	(United Kingdom) Shirli-Ann Siddall	1	1
(Romania) Cătălina Cristea	6	6
(France) Virginie Buisson	7	6
(United States) Christine Neuman	5	0
WC	(United Kingdom) Jane Wood	6	6
2	(Venezuela) María Vento	4	3

Second round
15	(Slovenia) Tina Križan	3	6	5
(Romania) Cătălina Cristea	6	3	7
(France) Virginie Buisson	3	2
WC	(United Kingdom) Jane Wood	6	6

Qualifying competition
(Romania) Cătălina Cristea	6	6
WC	(United Kingdom) Jane Wood	4	2
