= Mark Joachim =

German tennis player

- Full name: Mark Philipp Joachim
- Country (sports): Germany
- Born: 10 May 1973 (age 51); Munich, West Germany
- Prize money: $22,998

Singles
- Highest ranking: No. 266 (7 Dec 1998)

Grand Slam singles results
- Australian Open: Q1 (1997)
- Wimbledon: Q1 (1997, 1999)

Doubles
- Career record: 1–1
- Highest ranking: No. 363 (14 Nov 1994)

Mark Philipp Joachim (born 10 May 1973) is a German former professional tennis player.

Born in Munich, Joachim had a best singles world ranking of 266 on the professional tour, where he made qualifying draw appearances at the Australian Open and Wimbledon. He featured in his only ATP Tour main draw at the Austrian Open Kitzbühel in 1991, reaching the second round of the doubles.

== ITF Futures finals ==
=== Singles: 2 (0–2) ===
Result	W–L	Date	Tournament	Surface	Opponent	Score
Loss	0–1	Sep 1998	France F5, Bagneres de Bigorre	Hard	(France) Thierry Guardiola	2–6, 3–6
Loss	0–2	Nov 2007	Spain F41, Gran Canaria	Clay	(Italy) Manuel Jorquera	2–6, 3–6

=== Doubles: 1 (0–1) ===
Result	W–L	Date	Tournament	Surface	Partner	Opponents	Score
Loss	0–1	Nov 2006	Spain F38, Gran Canaria	Clay	(Germany) Sascha Hesse	(Spain) Cesar Ferrer Victoria (Spain) Marc Fornell Mestres	0–6, 4–6
