= 1993 Philips Head Cup =

- Date: 2–9 August
- Edition: 23rd
- Category: ATP World Series
- Draw: 48S / 24D
- Prize money: $375,000
- Surface: Clay / outdoor
- Location: Kitzbühel, Austria
- Venue: Kitzbüheler Tennisclub

Champions

Singles
- (Austria) Thomas Muster

Doubles
- (Argentina) Juan Garat / (Argentina) Roberto Saad
← 1992 ·	Austrian Open Kitzbühel	· 1994 →

The 1993 Philips Head Cup, also known as the Austrian Open Kitzbühel, was a men's tennis tournament held on outdoor clay courts at the Kitzbüheler Tennisclub in Kitzbühel, Austria that was part of the ATP World Series of the 1993 ATP Tour. It was the 23rd edition of the tournament and was held from 2 August until 9 August 1993. Third-seeded Thomas Muster won the singles title.

== Finals ==
=== Singles ===
(Austria) Thomas Muster defeated (Spain) Javier Sánchez 6–3, 7–5, 6–4

- It was Muster's 4th singles title of the year and 17th of his career.

=== Doubles ===
(Argentina) Juan Garat / (Argentina) Roberto Saad defeated (South Africa) Marius Barnard / (United States) Tom Mercer 7–6, 2–6, 6–3
