= Thomas Strengberger =

Austrian tennis player

- Country (sports): Austria
- Born: 5 October 1975 (age 49)
- Plays: Right-handed
- Prize money: $62,659

Singles
- Highest ranking: No. 447 (5 Aug 1996)

Doubles
- Career record: 8-10
- Career titles: 0
- Highest ranking: No. 135 (13 Sep 1999)

Thomas Strengberger (born 5 October 1975) is a former professional tennis player from Austria.

== Career ==
A doubles specialist, Strengberger had the best performance of his career at the 1997 Austrian Open, where he and partner Thomas Buchmayer were surprise finalists, having entered the tournament as wildcards. They upset the top seeded pairing of Luis Lobo and Andrei Olhovskiy in the semi-final, but were unable to defeat Wayne Arthurs and Richard Fromberg in the decider. The Austrian did well at his home event again in 2001, making the quarter-finals, this time with Wolfgang Schranz as his partner.

Strengberger appeared in two Davis Cup ties for Austria during his career. In 1998, he and Schranz won a doubles rubber over Kenneth Carlsen and Frederik Fetterlein. Two years later, with Austria now in the World Group, Strengberger teamed up with Julian Knowle for their doubles rubber against France. The French duo, Olivier Delaître and Nicolas Escudé, proved too strong.

== ATP career finals ==
=== Doubles: 1 (0–1) ===
Result	W–L	Year	Tournament	Surface	Partner	Opponents	Score
Loss	0–1	1997	Kitzbühel, Austria	Clay	(Austria) Thomas Buchmayer	(Australia) Wayne Arthurs (Australia) Richard Fromberg	4–6, 3–6

== Challenger titles ==
=== Doubles: (8) ===
No.	Year	Tournament	Surface	Partner	Opponents	Score
1.	1997	Skopje, Macedonia	Clay	(Austria) Thomas Buchmayer	(Federal Republic of Yugoslavia) Nebojsa Djordjevic (Federal Republic of Yugoslavia) Dušan Vemić	6–4, 7–6
2.	1998	Kyiv, Ukraine	Clay	(Austria) Thomas Buchmayer	(South Africa) Jeff Coetzee (United States) Jim Thomas	6–4, 7–6
3.	1998	Budapest, Hungary	Clay	(Hungary) Gábor Köves	(Czech Republic) Leoš Friedl (Czech Republic) Radek Štěpánek	6–4, 6–4
4.	1999	Vienna, Austria	Clay	(Austria) Julian Knowle	(Czech Republic) Petr Kralert (Switzerland) Michel Kratochvil	6–3, 6–2
5.	1999	Manerbio, Italy	Clay	(Italy) Massimo Valeri	(Argentina) Federico Browne (Argentina) Francisco Cabello	6–3, 6–3
6.	1999	Freudenstadt, Germany	Clay	(Spain) Juan Balcells	(Czech Republic) Michal Tabara (Czech Republic) Robin Vik	4–6, 6–2, 6–3
7.	2000	Linz, Austria	Clay	(Austria) Julian Knowle	(Czech Republic) Petr Luxa (Czech Republic) David Škoch	6–3, 7–5
8.	2001	Manerbio, Italy	Clay	(Hungary) Attila Sávolt	(Italy) Alessandro Da Col (Italy) Andrea Stoppini	7–5, 7–5
