= Chad Clark (tennis) =

American tennis player

- Full name: Chad Michael Clark
- Country (sports): United States
- Born: October 28, 1973 (age 51)
- Prize money: $25,726

Singles
- Highest ranking: No. 595 (June 10, 1996)

Doubles
- Career record: 3–7
- Highest ranking: No. 165 (March 10, 1997)

Grand Slam doubles results
- US Open: 1R (1996)

Chad Michael Clark (born October 28, 1973) is a former professional tennis player from the United States.

== Biography ==
Clark, who grew up in Longview, played collegiate tennis at the Texas Longhorns, where he was an ITA All-American for both singles and doubles in 1994 and 1995.

=== Professional career ===
Across 1996 and 1997 he competed on the professional tour, as a doubles specialist. His singles appearances were rare but he made the final round of qualifying at the 1996 Wimbledon Championships, losing in five sets to Tom Kempers.

At the 1996 US Open he featured in the main draw of the men's doubles, with Jeff Salzenstein.

On the ATP Tour his best performance was a semi-final appearance partnering Kevin Ullyett at Long Island in 1996.

A runner-up in four Challenger finals, Clark reached his best doubles ranking in 1997, of 165 in the world.
