= 1988 Head Cup =

- Date: 1–7 August
- Edition: 18th
- Category: Grand Prix
- Draw: 64S / 32D
- Prize money: $250,000
- Surface: Clay / outdoor
- Location: Kitzbühel Austria
- Venue: Tennis stadium Kitzbühel

Champions

Singles
- (Sweden) Kent Carlsson

Doubles
- (Spain) Sergio Casal / (Spain) Emilio Sánchez
- Austrian Open Kitzbühel

The 1988 Head Cup, also known as the 1988 Austrian Open Kitzbühel, was a men's tennis tournament played on outdoor clay courts that was part of the 1988 Nabisco Grand Prix. It was the 18th edition of the tournament and took place at the Tennis stadium Kitzbühel in Kitzbühel, Austria, from 1 August until 7 August 1988. Third-seeded Kent Carlsson won the singles title.

== Finals ==
=== Singles ===
(Sweden) Kent Carlsson defeated (Spain) Emilio Sánchez, 6–1, 6–1, 4–6, 4–6, 6–3

- It was Carlsson's 3rd singles title of the year and the 7th of his career.

=== Doubles ===
(Spain) Sergio Casal / (Spain) Emilio Sánchez defeated (Sweden) Joakim Nyström / (Italy) Claudio Panatta, 6–4, 7–6
