= Hans Priller =

- Country (sports): Austria
- Born: 6 March 1971 (age 54)
- Prize money: $10,468

Singles
- Career record: 0–2
- Highest ranking: No. 309 (30 Oct 1989)

Grand Slam singles results
- Australian Open: Q2 (1989)

Doubles
- Career record: 1–2
- Highest ranking: No. 346 (30 Jul 1990)

Hans Priller (born 6 March 1971) is an Austrian former professional tennis player.

Priller, who had a career high singles world ranking of 309, featured twice the main draw of the Austrian Open Kitzbühel, as a wildcard in both 1988 and 1989. He is the elder brother of WTA Tour player Ulrike Priller.
