= Gerald Mandl =

Austrian tennis player

- Full name: Gerald Mandl
- Country (sports): Austria
- Born: 12 November 1970 (age 55) Graz, Austria
- Plays: Left-handed
- Prize money: $113,624

Singles
- Career record: 4–9
- Career titles: 0
- Highest ranking: No. 186 (123 February 1998)

Doubles
- Career record: 4–12
- Career titles: 0
- Highest ranking: No. 211 (12 August 1996)

Grand Slam doubles results
- Wimbledon: 1R (1996)

Gerald Mandl (born 12 November 1970) is a former professional tennis player from Austria.

== Biography ==
A left-hander from Sankt Johann, Mandl first represented Austria at Davis Cup level in 1991, for a World Group qualifier against Great Britain in Manchester. His loss in the doubles with Thomas Muster gave the tie to the home side and he got a consolation win in the reverse singles by beating Jeremy Bates. When he next played for Austria in 1992 it was in another World Group qualifier, against Canada in Vancouver. He teamed up with Alex Antonitsch to beat Grant Connell and Glenn Michibata in the doubles, over five sets, which gave Austria a 2–1 lead. Antonitsch then won in the reverse singles to secure Austria's place in the World Group for 1993.

On the ATP Tour, Mandl made it to as high as 186 in the world, twice reaching the second round at the Austrian Open Kitzbühel and once in Munich. In doubles he was a quarter-finalist at Kitzbuhel in 1996 with Georg Blumauer. His only Grand Slam main draw appearance was in doubles, partnering Macedonian player Aleksandar Kitinov at the 1996 Wimbledon Championships. They had to battle through the qualifying rounds, securing a spot in the main draw with a five set win, before they were beaten in the first round by Richey Reneberg and Jim Grabb.

After a four-year absence he was selected for the Davis Cup again in 1997, for a tie against Zimbabwe. He played his fourth and final tie in Israel the following year and finished with a 2/4 overall record in Davis Cup matches.

Mandl now runs a tennis academy in Salzburg. He is a former coach of Anke Huber and Barbara Schett.

== See also ==
- List of Austria Davis Cup team representatives
