= Thomas Buchmayer =

Austrian tennis player (born 1971)

- Full name: Thomas Buchmayer
- Country (sports): Austria
- Born: 14 February 1971 (age 55) St. Polten, Austria
- Plays: Left-handed
- Prize money: $124,133

Singles
- Career record: 10–14
- Career titles: 0
- Highest ranking: No. 198 (16 September 1991)

Doubles
- Career record: 7–22
- Career titles: 0
- Highest ranking: No. 133 (20 July 1998)

Thomas Buchmayer (born 14 February 1971) is a former professional tennis player from Austria.

== Biography ==
Buchmayer, a left-handed player from Sankt Pölten, was coached by Jan Kukal.

Turning professional in 1989, he made the round of 16 as a wildcard at Kitzbühel that year, with wins over Tomás Carbonell and world number 12 Alberto Mancini.

In 1991 he made his debut for the Austria Davis Cup team and featured in two World Group ties. He played a reverse singles match in the first, against Czechoslovakia in Prague, which he won over Karel Nováček, but the Austrians had already lost the tie. His other tie was a qualifier in Manchester against Great Britain. He lost the opening singles match to Jeremy Bates in four sets, then later played in the last of the reserve singles, by which time the British team had taken Austria's place in the World Group. His reserve singles fixture, against Mark Petchey, was unfinished, abandoned at 6–6 in the first set.

His next Davis Cup match came in 1993, when Austria were up against New Zealand in Christchurch. Back in the World Group, Austria were playing a tie to avoid relegation and won 3–2. Buchmayer featured in the doubles match with Alex Antonitsch, which they lost to Kelly Evernden and Brett Steven.

Buchmayer's only final on the ATP Tour came in the doubles at the 1997 Austrian Open in Kitzbühel. He and partner Thomas Strengberger accounted for top seeds Luis Lobo and Andrei Olhovskiy in the semi-finals, but were unable to get past the Australian pairing of Wayne Arthurs and Richard Fromberg in the title decider.

He played in his fourth and final Davis Cup tie for Austria in 1998, the doubles rubber against Israeli players Noam Behr and Eyal Erlich in Ramat Hasaron. Partnered with Wolfgang Schranz, the Austrian's lost the match and also the tie.

== ATP Tour career finals ==
=== Doubles: 1 (0–1) ===
| Result | W–L | Year | Tournament | Surface | Partner | Opponents | Score |
|---|---|---|---|---|---|---|---|
| Loss | 0–1 | 1997 | Kitzbühel, Austria | Clay | (Austria) Thomas Strengberger | (Australia) Wayne Arthurs (Australia) Richard Fromberg | 4–6, 3–6 |

== Challenger titles ==
=== Singles: (2) ===
| No. | Year | Tournament | Surface | Opponent | Score |
|---|---|---|---|---|---|
| 1. | 1991 | Graz, Austria | Clay | (France) Thierry Guardiola | 6–3, 6–2 |
| 2. | 1992 | Vienna, Austria | Clay | (Austria) Reinhard Wawra | 7–6, 6–1 |

=== Doubles: (2) ===
| No. | Year | Tournament | Surface | Partner | Opponents | Score |
|---|---|---|---|---|---|---|
| 1. | 1998 | Kyiv, Ukraine | Clay | (Austria) Thomas Strengberger | (South Africa) Jeff Coetzee (United States) Jim Thomas | 6–4, 7–6 |
| 2. | 1997 | Skopje, Macedonia | Clay | (Austria) Thomas Strengberger | (Serbia and Montenegro) Nebojša Djorđević (Serbia and Montenegro) Dušan Vemić | 6–4, 7–6 |

== See also ==
- List of Austria Davis Cup team representatives
