= 1992 Trofeo Kim Top Line – Singles =

Singles
- 1992 Trofeo Kim Top Line

Final
- Champion: (Austria) Thomas Muster
- Runner-up: (Italy) Renzo Furlan
- Score: 6–3, 1–6, 6–1

Details
- Draw: 32 (3WC/4Q/2LL)
- Seeds: 8

Events
Singles	Doubles
- ATP Florence

Thomas Muster, who entered as a wild card, successfully defended his title by defeating Renzo Furlan 6–3, 1–6, 6–1 in the final.

== Seeds ==
1. (Austria) Thomas Muster (champion)
2. (Netherlands) Paul Haarhuis (first round)
3. (Sweden) Magnus Gustafsson (semifinals)
4. (Spain) Jordi Arrese (second round)
5. (n/a)
6. (France) Thierry Champion (second round)
7. (Croatia) Goran Prpić (first round)
8. (France) Fabrice Santoro (quarterfinals)

== Draw ==
Key

- Q = Qualifier
- WC = Wild card
- LL = Lucky loser
- Alt = Alternate
- ITF = ITF entry
- PR = Protected ranking
- SR = Special ranking
- SE = Special exempt
- JE = Junior exempt
- JR = Junior Accelerator Programme entrant
- CO = College Accelerator Programme entrant
- NG = Next Gen Accelerator Program entrant
- w/o = Walkover
- r = Retired
- d = Defaulted

=== Finals ===
Semifinals
1/WC	(Austria) Thomas Muster	6	7
3/WC	(Sweden) Magnus Gustafsson	4	5
(Italy) Renzo Furlan	6	3	6
(Uruguay) Marcelo Filippini	3	6	1

Final
1/WC	(Austria) Thomas Muster	6	1	6
(Italy) Renzo Furlan	3	6	1

=== Top half ===
First round
1/WC	(Austria) T Muster	6	6^{4}	6
(Argentina) G Pérez Roldán	1	7^{7}	2
(Argentina) R Azar	3	6	6
(France) F Fontang	6	3	0
(Switzerland) C Mezzadri	4	6^{5}
(Brazil) L Mattar	6	7^{7}
(Germany) L Koslowski	6	6
7/WC	(Croatia) G Prpić	3	3
3/WC	(Sweden) M Gustafsson	4	6	6
(Spain) M Górriz	6	2	4
(Netherlands) M Koevermans	6	6
(Spain) JF Altur	4	3
LL	(Argentina) F Yunis	6	6
(Sweden) L Jönsson	3	4
(Finland) V Paloheimo	7	6
Q	(Spain) J Mas	5	2

Second round
1/WC	(Austria) T Muster	6	6
(Argentina) R Azar	1	3
(Brazil) L Mattar	7	6
(Germany) L Koslowski	5	4
3/WC	(Sweden) M Gustafsson	6	6
(Netherlands) M Koevermans	2	0
LL	(Argentina) F Yunis	3	7^{8}	6
(Finland) V Paloheimo	6	6^{6}	1

Quarterfinals
1/WC	(Austria) T Muster	6	6^{4}	6
(Brazil) L Mattar	4	7^{7}	3
3/WC	(Sweden) M Gustafsson	6	6
LL	(Argentina) F Yunis	1	3

Semifinals
1/WC	(Austria) T Muster	6	7
3/WC	(Sweden) M Gustafsson	4	5

=== Bottom half ===
First round
6	(France) T Champion	4	6	6
(Sweden) N Kulti	6	1	4
(Argentina) H de la Peña	6	1	6^{10}
(Argentina) F Davín	3	6	7^{12}
(Italy) R Furlan	6	6
(Italy) P Canè	1	4
Q	(Italy) F Michelotti	7^{8}	5	6^{5}
4	(Spain) J Arrese	6^{6}	7	7^{7}
8	(France) F Santoro	6	6
LL	(Estonia) A Võsand	3	2
Q	(Morocco) K Alami	5	6	4
(Spain) G López	7	4	6
(Belgium) E Masso	3	6^{2}
Q	(Austria) G Schaller	6	7^{7}
(Uruguay) M Filippini	7^{7}	0	6
2	(Netherlands) P Haarhuis	6^{1}	6	2

Second round
6	(France) T Champion	1	5
(Argentina) F Davín	6	7
(Italy) R Furlan	7^{7}	6
4	(Spain) J Arrese	6^{4}	1
8	(France) F Santoro	6	6
(Spain) G López	0	1
Q	(Austria) G Schaller	5	4
(Uruguay) M Filippini	7	6

Quarterfinals
(Argentina) F Davín	2	4
(Italy) R Furlan	6	6
8	(France) F Santoro	6^{4}	3
(Uruguay) M Filippini	7^{7}	6

Semifinals
(Italy) R Furlan	6	3	6
(Uruguay) M Filippini	3	6	1
