= 1990 Czechoslovak Open – Singles =

Singles
- 1990 Czechoslovak Open

Final
- Champion: (Spain) Jordi Arrese
- Runner-up: (Sweden) Nicklas Kulti
- Score: 7–6, 7–6

Details
- Draw: 32 (3WC/4Q)
- Seeds: 8

Events
| Singles | Doubles |
| ← 1989 · | Prague Open (1987–1999) | · 1991 → |

Marcelo Filippini was the defending champion, but lost in the second round to Nicklas Kulti.

Jordi Arrese won the title by defeating Kulti 7–6, 7–6 in the final.

== Seeds ==
1. (Austria) Thomas Muster (first round, retired)
2. (Argentina) Guillermo Pérez Roldán (first round, retired)
3. (Austria) Horst Skoff (quarterfinals)
4. (Uruguay) Marcelo Filippini (second round)
5. (Argentina) Franco Davín (quarterfinals)
6. (Socialist Federal Republic of Yugoslavia) Goran Prpić (semifinals)
7. (Sweden) Magnus Larsson (first round)
8. (Spain) Jordi Arrese (champion)

== Draw ==
=== Key ===
- Q = Qualifier
- WC = Wild card
- LL = Lucky loser
- Alt = Alternate
- SE = Special exempt
- PR = Protected ranking
- ITF = ITF entry
- JE = Junior exempt
- w/o = Walkover
- r = Retired
- d = Defaulted
- SR = Special ranking

=== Finals ===
Semifinals
(Argentina) Horacio de la Peña | 3 | 0^{r}
(Sweden) Nicklas Kulti | 6 | 1
6 | (Socialist Federal Republic of Yugoslavia) Goran Prpić | 5 | 4
8 | (Spain) Jordi Arrese | 7 | 6

Final
(Sweden) Nicklas Kulti | 6 | 6
8 | (Spain) Jordi Arrese | 7 | 7

=== Top half ===
First round
1 | (Austria) T Muster | 0^{r}
(Italy) C Pistolesi | 1
(France) T Benhabiles | 6 | 3 | 6
(Spain) F Luna | 4 | 6 | 4
Q | (Italy) S Pescosolido | 6 | 6
Q | (Czechoslovakia) R Hanák | 3 | 1
(Argentina) H de la Peña | 6 | 6
7 | (Sweden) M Larsson | 0 | 2
4 | (Uruguay) M Filippini | 7 | 6
Q | (Czechoslovakia) C Suk | 6 | 1
(Germany) A Mronz | 3 | 2
(Sweden) N Kulti | 6 | 6
(Belgium) B Wuyts | 2 | 6 | 6
(Argentina) R Azar | 6 | 3 | 3
(United States) J Brown | 3 | 6 | 3
5 | (Argentina) F Davín | 6 | 2 | 6

Second round
(Italy) C Pistolesi | 3 | 3
(France) T Benhabiles | 6 | 6
Q | (Italy) S Pescosolido | 3 | 1
(Argentina) H de la Peña | 6 | 6
4 | (Uruguay) M Filippini | 1 | 3
(Sweden) N Kulti | 6 | 6
(Belgium) B Wuyts | 3 | 2
5 | (Argentina) F Davín | 6 | 6

Quarterfinals
(France) T Benhabiles | 2 | 6
(Argentina) H de la Peña | 6 | 7
(Sweden) N Kulti | 6 | 1 | 6
5 | (Argentina) F Davín | 3 | 6 | 2

Semifinals
(Argentina) H de la Peña | 3 | 0^{r}
(Sweden) N Kulti | 6 | 1

=== Bottom half ===
First round
6 | (Socialist Federal Republic of Yugoslavia) G Prpić | 4 | 6 | 6
(Germany) P Vojtíšek | 6 | 3 | 1
(Finland) V Paloheimo | 6 | 6
(Czechoslovakia) M Střelba | 0 | 2
(Czechoslovakia) M Vajda | 3 | 6 | 6
(Spain) F Clavet | 6 | 4 | 2
(United States) L Duncan | 2 | 1
3 | (Austria) H Skoff | 6 | 6
8 | (Spain) J Arrese | 6 | 6
WC | (Czechoslovakia) S Doseděl | 4 | 4
(France) C Pioline | 6 | 2
WC | (Czechoslovakia) J Kodeš Jr. | 7 | 6
(Germany) C Saceanu | 6 | 6
WC | (Czechoslovakia) M Damm | 4 | 3
Q | (Socialist Federal Republic of Yugoslavia) S Hiršzon | 6
2 | (Argentina) G Pérez Roldán | 1 | r

Second round
6 | (Socialist Federal Republic of Yugoslavia) G Prpić | 7 | 6
(Finland) V Paloheimo | 5 | 0
(Czechoslovakia) M Vajda | 4 | 1
3 | (Austria) H Skoff | 6 | 6
8 | (Spain) J Arrese | 2 | 6 | 6
WC | (Czechoslovakia) J Kodeš Jr. | 6 | 0 | 2
(Germany) C Saceanu | 6 | 2 | 7
Q | (Socialist Federal Republic of Yugoslavia) S Hiršzon | 2 | 6 | 6

Quarterfinals
6 | (Socialist Federal Republic of Yugoslavia) G Prpić | 2 | 6 | 7
3 | (Austria) H Skoff | 6 | 3 | 6
8 | (Spain) J Arrese | w/o
(Germany) C Saceanu

Semifinals
6 | (Socialist Federal Republic of Yugoslavia) G Prpić | 5 | 4
8 | (Spain) J Arrese | 7 | 6
