= 1996 Grand Prix Hassan II – Doubles =

Doubles
- 1996 Grand Prix Hassan II

Final
- Champions: (Czech Republic) Jiří Novák (Czech Republic) David Rikl
- Runners-up: (Spain) Tomás Carbonell (Spain) Francisco Roig
- Score: 7–6, 6–3

Details
- Draw: 16
- Seeds: 4

Events
Singles	Doubles
← 1995 ·	Grand Prix Hassan II	· 1997 →

Tomás Carbonell and Francisco Roig were the defending champions but lost in the final 7–6, 6–3 against Jiří Novák and David Rikl.

== Seeds ==
1. (Spain) Tomás Carbonell / (Spain) Francisco Roig (final)
2. (Netherlands) Hendrik Jan Davids / (Germany) Marc-Kevin Goellner (semifinals)
3. (Czech Republic) Jiří Novák / (Czech Republic) David Rikl (champions)
4. (United Kingdom) Neil Broad / (South Africa) Piet Norval (semifinals)

== Draw ==
=== Key ===
- Q = Qualifier
- WC = Wild card
- LL = Lucky loser
- Alt = Alternate
- ITF = ITF entry
- PR = Protected ranking
- SR = Special ranking
- SE = Special exempt
- JE = Junior exempt
- JR = Junior Accelerator Programme entrant
- CO = College Accelerator Programme entrant
- NG = Next Gen Accelerator Program entrant
- w/o = Walkover
- r = Retired
- d = Defaulted

First round
1	(Spain) T Carbonell (Spain) F Roig	6	6
WC	(Morocco) H Arazi (Germany) P Baur	2	2
Q	(Spain) A Berasategui (Spain) J Burillo	6	6
WC	(Austria) T Buchmayer (Austria) G Schaller	3	2
4	(United Kingdom) N Broad (South Africa) P Norval	6	6	6
WC	(Haiti) R Agénor (Morocco) M Tahiri	7	2	1
(United States) J Palmer (South Africa) C van Rensburg	6	6
(South Africa) C Ferreira (Spain) J Imaz	2	3
(South Africa) D Adams (Australia) J Ireland	6	7
(United States) J Belloli (Egypt) T El-Sawy	2	6
(France) F Santoro (Italy) L Tieleman	1	0
3	(Czech Republic) J Novák (Czech Republic) D Rikl	6	6
(Spain) J Arrese (Spain) J A Conde	4	2
(Portugal) N Marques (Belgium) T Vanhoudt	6	6
(Portugal) E Couto (Portugal) J Cunha e Silva	4	1
2	(Netherlands) H J Davids (Germany) M-K Goellner	6	6

Quarterfinals
1	(Spain) T Carbonell (Spain) F Roig	4	6	6
Q	(Spain) A Berasategui (Spain) J Burillo	6	2	3
4	(United Kingdom) N Broad (South Africa) P Norval	6	7
(United States) J Palmer (South Africa) C van Rensburg	3	5
(South Africa) D Adams (Australia) J Ireland	7	6	6
3	(Czech Republic) J Novák (Czech Republic) D Rikl	6	7	7
(Portugal) N Marques (Belgium) T Vanhoudt	5	1
2	(Netherlands) H J Davids (Germany) M-K Goellner	7	6

Semifinals
1	(Spain) T Carbonell (Spain) F Roig	6	2	6
4	(United Kingdom) N Broad (South Africa) P Norval	1	6	2
3	(Czech Republic) J Novák (Czech Republic) D Rikl	7	4	6
2	(Netherlands) H J Davids (Germany) M-K Goellner	6	6	4

Final
1	(Spain) T Carbonell (Spain) F Roig	6	3
3	(Czech Republic) J Novák (Czech Republic) D Rikl	7	6
