= 1991 Czechoslovak Open – Doubles =

Doubles
- 1991 Czechoslovak Open

Final
- Champions: (Czechoslovakia) Vojtěch Flégl (Czechoslovakia) Cyril Suk
- Runners-up: (Czechoslovakia) Libor Pimek (Czechoslovakia) Daniel Vacek
- Score: 6–4, 6–2

Details
- Draw: 16
- Seeds: 4

Events
Singles	Doubles
← 1990 ·	Prague Open	· 1992 →

The 1991 Skoda Czechoslovak Open was a men's tennis tournament played on Clay in Prague, Czech Republic that was part of the International Series of the 1991 ATP Tour. Vojtěch Flégl and Daniel Vacek were the defending champions, but competed this year with different partners. Both players face esch other in the final, where Flégl (teaming up with Cyril Suk) defeated Vacek (teaming up with Libor Pimek), with a score of 6–4, 6–2.

== Seeds ==
1. (Czechoslovakia) Vojtěch Flégl / (Czechoslovakia) Cyril Suk (champions)
2. (Czechoslovakia) Libor Pimek / (Czechoslovakia) Daniel Vacek (final)
3. (Sweden) Magnus Gustafsson / (Czechoslovakia) Karel Nováček (first round)
4. (Spain) Carlos Costa / (Venezuela) Alfonso Mora (first round)

== Draw ==
=== Key ===
- Q = Qualifier
- WC = Wild card
- LL = Lucky loser
- Alt = Alternate
- SE = Special exempt
- PR = Protected ranking
- ITF = ITF entry
- JE = Junior exempt
- w/o = Walkover
- r = Retired
- d = Defaulted
- SR = Special ranking

=== Draw ===
First round
1	(Czechoslovakia) V Flégl (Czechoslovakia) C Suk	6	6
(Uruguay) M Filippini (New Zealand) S Guy	3	1
(Sweden) N Kulti (Sweden) M Larsson	6	6
WC	(Czechoslovakia) Dušan Prchlík (Czechoslovakia) Lukas Thomas	3	2
4	(Spain) C Costa (Venezuela) A Mora	3	5
(Hungary) S Noszály (Czechoslovakia) R Vašek	6	7
(South Africa) D Adams (Austria) H Skoff	6	7
(Romania) G Cosac (Romania) F Segărceanu	3	5
(Belgium) X Daufresne (Belgium) G Vanderveeren	5	6
(Latvia) Ģ Dzelde (Russia) A Olhovskiy	7	7
(Spain) JF Altur (Peru) P Arraya	6	6	6
3	(Sweden) M Gustafsson (Czechoslovakia) K Nováček	4	7	3
(Sweden) P Henricsson (Sweden) L Jönsson	6	6
Q	(Czechoslovakia) Robert Novotny (Czechoslovakia) M Trněný	2	4
(Ukraine) D Poliakov (Socialist Federal Republic of Yugoslavia) Slobodan Vojinović	4	3
2	(Czechoslovakia) L Pimek (Czechoslovakia) D Vacek	6	6

Quarterfinals
1	(Czechoslovakia) V Flégl (Czechoslovakia) C Suk	6	7
(Sweden) N Kulti (Sweden) M Larsson	3	6
(Hungary) S Noszály (Czechoslovakia) R Vašek	5	5
(South Africa) D Adams (Austria) H Skoff	7	7
(Latvia) Ģ Dzelde (Russia) A Olhovskiy	3	3
(Spain) JF Altur (Peru) P Arraya	6	6
(Sweden) P Henricsson (Sweden) L Jönsson	2	3
2	(Czechoslovakia) L Pimek (Czechoslovakia) D Vacek	6	6

Semifinals
1	(Czechoslovakia) V Flégl (Czechoslovakia) C Suk	6	6
(South Africa) D Adams (Austria) H Skoff	3	3
(Spain) JF Altur (Peru) P Arraya	6	3	4
2	(Czechoslovakia) L Pimek (Czechoslovakia) D Vacek	4	6	6

Final
1	(Czechoslovakia) V Flégl (Czechoslovakia) C Suk	6	6
2	(Czechoslovakia) L Pimek (Czechoslovakia) D Vacek	4	2
