= 1994 Topper Open =

- Date: 31 October – 6 November
- Edition: 1st
- Category: World Series
- Draw: 32S / 16D
- Prize money: $188,750
- Surface: Clay / outdoor
- Location: Montevideo, Uruguay

Champions

Singles
- (Spain) Alberto Berasategui

Doubles
- (Uruguay) Marcelo Filippini / (Brazil) Luiz Mattar
ATP Montevideo	· 1995 →

The 1994 Topper Open was a men's tennis tournament held in Montevideo, Uruguay and played on outdoor clay courts. The tournament was part of the World Series circuit of the 1994 ATP Tour. It was the inaugural edition of the tournament and was held from 31 October through 6 November 1994. First-seeded Alberto Berasategui won the singles title.

== Finals ==
=== Singles ===
(Spain) Alberto Berasategui defeated (Spain) Francisco Clavet 6–4, 6–0

- It was Berasategui's 7th singles title of the year and the 8th of his career.

=== Doubles ===
(Uruguay) Marcelo Filippini / (Brazil) Luiz Mattar defeated (Spain) Sergio Casal / (Spain) Emilio Sánchez, 7–6, 6–4
