= 1995 Topper Open – Singles =

Singles
- 1995 Topper Open

Final
- Champion: (Czech Republic) Bohdan Ulihrach
- Runner-up: (Spain) Alberto Berasategui
- Score: 6–2, 6–3

Details
- Draw: 32 (3WC/3Q/1LL)
- Seeds: 8

Events
Singles	Doubles
← 1994 ·	ATP Montevideo

Alberto Berasategui was the defending champion, but lost in the final to Bohdan Ulihrach. The score was 6–2, 6–3.

== Seeds ==
1. (Austria) Gilbert Schaller (first round)
2. (Spain) Alberto Berasategui (final)
3. (Spain) Albert Costa (first round)
4. (Chile) Marcelo Ríos (first round)
5. (Spain) Francisco Clavet (semifinals)
6. (Spain) Carlos Costa (second round)
7. (Spain) Javier Sánchez (second round)
8. (Czech Republic) Bohdan Ulihrach (champion)

== Draw ==
=== Key ===
- Q = Qualifier
- WC = Wild card
- LL = Lucky loser
- Alt = Alternate
- ITF = ITF entry
- PR = Protected ranking
- SR = Special ranking
- SE = Special exempt
- JE = Junior exempt
- JR = Junior Accelerator Programme entrant
- CO = College Accelerator Programme entrant
- NG = Next Gen Accelerator Program entrant
- w/o = Walkover
- r = Retired
- d = Defaulted

=== Finals ===
Semifinals
8	(Czech Republic) Bohdan Ulihrach	7	6
5	(Spain) Francisco Clavet	5	4
LL	(Spain) Jordi Burillo	7	3	5
2	(Spain) Alberto Berasategui	5	6	7

Final
8	(Czech Republic) Bohdan Ulihrach	6	6
2	(Spain) Alberto Berasategui	2	3

=== Top half ===
First round
1	(Austria) G Schaller	3	6	3
(Morocco) K Alami	6	4	6
(Czech Republic) D Rikl	2	4
(France) F Santoro	6	6
WC	(Venezuela) N Pereira	6	6
(Portugal) N Marques	3	4
(Spain) J Arrese	4	6	5
8	(Czech Republic) B Ulihrach	6	4	7
4	(Chile) M Ríos	4	6	2
(Czech Republic) J Novák	6	4	6
Q	(Chile) G Silberstein	3	4
(Argentina) H Gumy	6	6
(Czech Republic) S Doseděl	6	2	5
Q	(Spain) G Blanco	3	6	7
(Norway) C Ruud	4	2
5	(Spain) F Clavet	6	6

Second round
(Morocco) K Alami	3	6	6
(France) F Santoro	6	2	3
WC	(Venezuela) N Pereira	6^{4}	2
8	(Czech Republic) B Ulihrach	7^{7}	6
(Czech Republic) J Novák	6^{6}	5
(Argentina) H Gumy	7^{8}	7
Q	(Spain) G Blanco	1	4
5	(Spain) F Clavet	6	6

Quarterfinals
(Morocco) K Alami	1	3
8	(Czech Republic) B Ulihrach	6	6
(Argentina) H Gumy	6^{3}	1
5	(Spain) F Clavet	7^{7}	6

Semifinals
8	(Czech Republic) B Ulihrach	7	6
5	(Spain) F Clavet	5	4

=== Bottom half ===
First round
6	(Spain) C Costa	7	6
(Colombia) M Hadad	5	3
(Netherlands) S Schalken	6	4	3
(Brazil) F Meligeni	4	6	6
WC	(Peru) J Yzaga	3	6	3
Q	(Spain) C Moyá	6	1	6
LL	(Spain) J Burillo	7	6
3	(Spain) A Costa	5	2
7	(Spain) J Sánchez	7^{7}	4	7^{7}
(Hungary) S Noszály	6^{5}	6	6^{5}
(Spain) À Corretja	3	6^{3}
WC	(Uruguay) M Filippini	6	7^{7}
(Spain) E Sánchez	7	7
(United States) V Spadea	5	5
(Spain) T Carbonell	2	4
2	(Spain) A Berasategui	6	6

Second round
6	(Spain) C Costa	4	6^{5}
(Brazil) F Meligeni	6	7^{7}
Q	(Spain) C Moyá	6^{2}	5
LL	(Spain) J Burillo	7^{7}	7
7	(Spain) J Sánchez	6^{5}	6	5
WC	(Uruguay) M Filippini	7^{7}	4	7
(Spain) E Sánchez	0	2
2	(Spain) A Berasategui	6	6

Quarterfinals
(Brazil) F Meligeni	2	6	2
LL	(Spain) J Burillo	6	1	6
WC	(Uruguay) M Filippini	2	1
2	(Spain) A Berasategui	6	6

Semifinals
LL	(Spain) J Burillo	7	3	5
2	(Spain) A Berasategui	5	6	7
