= 1994 Grand Prix Hassan II – Doubles =

Doubles
- 1994 Grand Prix Hassan II

Final
- Champions: (South Africa) David Adams (Netherlands) Menno Oosting
- Runners-up: (Italy) Cristian Brandi (Italy) Federico Mordegan
- Score: 6–3, 6–4

Events
Singles	Doubles
← 1993 ·	Grand Prix Hassan II	· 1995 →

Mike Bauer and Piet Norval were the defending champions, but did not participate this year.

David Adams and Menno Oosting won in the final 6–3, 6–4, against Cristian Brandi and Federico Mordegan.

== Seeds ==
1. (South Africa) David Adams / (Netherlands) Menno Oosting (champions)
2. (Spain) Tomás Carbonell / (Germany) Udo Riglewski (semifinals, withdrew)
3. (South Africa) Stefan Kruger / (Belgium) Libor Pimek (first round)
4. (Argentina) Horacio de la Peña / (Netherlands) Mark Koevermans (first round)

== Draw ==
=== Key ===
- Q = Qualifier
- WC = Wild card
- LL = Lucky loser
- Alt = Alternate
- ITF = ITF entry
- PR = Protected ranking
- SR = Special ranking
- SE = Special exempt
- JE = Junior exempt
- JR = Junior Accelerator Programme entrant
- CO = College Accelerator Programme entrant
- NG = Next Gen Accelerator Program entrant
- w/o = Walkover
- r = Retired
- d = Defaulted

=== Draw ===
First round
1	(South Africa) D Adams (Netherlands) M Oosting	7	6
WC	(Morocco) K Alami (Morocco) Y El Aynaoui	6	1
Q	(Czech Republic) S Doseděl (Ukraine) D Poliakov	2	6	6
(United States) M Lucena (Norway) B-O Pedersen	6	4	2
3	(South Africa) S Kruger (Belgium) L Pimek	7	4	4
(Germany) M Huning (Germany) M Zumpft	5	6	6
(Croatia) S Hiršzon (Argentina) D Orsanic	3	2
(Portugal) J Cunha e Silva (Sweden) T Nydahl	6	6
(Italy) C Brandi (Italy) F Mordegan	7	7
(Spain) E Benfele Álvarez (Spain) J Burillo	5	6
(Latvia) Ģ Dzelde (Argentina) J Garat	6	7
4	(Argentina) H de la Peña (Netherlands) M Koevermans	4	6
(Italy) A Gaudenzi (Austria) G Schaller	4	3
(United Kingdom) N Broad (South Africa) J de Beer	6	6
WC	(Morocco) H Arazi (Morocco) M Ridaoui	6	1
2	(Spain) T Carbonell (Germany) U Riglewski	7	6

Quarterfinals
1	(South Africa) D Adams (Netherlands) M Oosting	7	3	6
Q	(Czech Republic) S Doseděl (Ukraine) D Poliakov	6	6	3
(Germany) M Huning (Germany) M Zumpft	7	4	6
(Portugal) J Cunha e Silva (Sweden) T Nydahl	6	6	3
(Italy) C Brandi (Italy) F Mordegan	6	6
(Latvia) Ģ Dzelde (Argentina) J Garat	3	3
(United Kingdom) N Broad (South Africa) J de Beer	2	6	3
2	(Spain) T Carbonell (Germany) U Riglewski	6	4	6

Semifinals
1	(South Africa) D Adams (Netherlands) M Oosting	4	6	7
(Germany) M Huning (Germany) M Zumpft	6	3	6
(Italy) C Brandi (Italy) F Mordegan	w/o
2	(Spain) T Carbonell (Germany) U Riglewski

Final
1	(South Africa) D Adams (Netherlands) M Oosting	6	6
(Italy) C Brandi (Italy) F Mordegan	3	4
