= 1994 Topper Open – Singles =

Singles
- 1994 Topper Open

Final
- Champion: (Spain) Alberto Berasategui
- Runner-up: (Spain) Francisco Clavet
- Score: 6–4, 6–0

Details
- Draw: 32 (4Q/3WC)
- Seeds: 8

Events
Singles	Doubles
ATP Montevideo	· 1995 →

In the first edition of the tournament, Alberto Berasategui won the title by defeating his compatriot Francisco Clavet 6–4, 6–0 in the final.

== Seeds ==
1. (Spain) Alberto Berasategui (champion)
2. (Spain) Àlex Corretja (first round)
3. (Czech Republic) Sláva Doseděl (first round)
4. (Czech Republic) Karel Nováček (quarterfinals)
5. (Austria) Gilbert Schaller (semifinals)
6. (Spain) Albert Costa (second round)
7. (France) Fabrice Santoro (quarterfinals)
8. (Argentina) Franco Davín (first round, retired)

== Draw ==
=== Key ===
- Q = Qualifier
- WC = Wild card
- LL = Lucky loser
- Alt = Alternate
- ITF = ITF entry
- PR = Protected ranking
- SR = Special ranking
- SE = Special exempt
- JE = Junior exempt
- JR = Junior Accelerator Programme entrant
- CO = College Accelerator Programme entrant
- NG = Next Gen Accelerator Program entrant
- w/o = Walkover
- r = Retired
- d = Defaulted

=== Finals ===
Semifinals
1	(Spain) Alberto Berasategui	7	2	6
5	(Austria) Gilbert Schaller	5	6	3
(Uruguay) Marcelo Filippini	5	3
(Spain) Francisco Clavet	7	6

Final
1	(Spain) Alberto Berasategui	6	6
(Spain) Francisco Clavet	4	0

=== Top half ===
First round
1	(Spain) A Berasategui	7^{7}	6
(Venezuela) N Pereira	6^{3}	4
WC	(Spain) J Arrese	3	6	6
WC	(Sweden) M Wilander	6	3	3
(Sweden) L Jönsson	6	6
Q	(Argentina) G Etlis	3	4
(Morocco) Y El Aynaoui	4	6^{7}
7	(France) F Santoro	6	7^{9}
4	(Czech Republic) K Nováček	7^{7}	6
(Spain) E Sánchez	6^{4}	3
(Brazil) L Mattar	7^{7}	7^{8}
(Morocco) K Alami	6^{2}	6^{6}
(Chile) M Ríos	6	6
Q	(Spain) J Gisbert Schultze	2	0
WC	(Uruguay) D Pérez	4	1
5	(Austria) G Schaller	6	6

Second round
1	(Spain) A Berasategui	6	7^{7}
WC	(Spain) J Arrese	4	6^{5}
(Sweden) L Jönsson	0	6	2
7	(France) F Santoro	6	4	6
4	(Czech Republic) K Nováček	6	6
(Brazil) L Mattar	2	3
(Chile) M Ríos	6	1	2
5	(Austria) G Schaller	3	6	6

Quarterfinals
1	(Spain) A Berasategui	6	3	6
7	(France) F Santoro	4	6	0
4	(Czech Republic) K Nováček	4	6	4
5	(Austria) G Schaller	6	2	6

Semifinals
1	(Spain) A Berasategui	7	2	6
5	(Austria) G Schaller	5	6	3

=== Bottom half ===
First round
6	(Spain) A Costa	6	1	6
(Germany) O Gross	3	6	3
(Brazil) F Meligeni	3	6	1
(Uruguay) M Filippini	6	4	6
(Argentina) G Markus	3	7^{8}	6
(Argentina) J Frana	6	6^{6}	4
(Colombia) M Hadad	6^{6}	6	7^{7}
3	(Czech Republic) S Doseděl	7^{8}	2	6^{4}
8	(Argentina) F Davín	1	0^{r}
Q	(Spain) JA Viloca	6	1
(Spain) F Clavet	6	5	6
(Spain) T Carbonell	1	7	0
Q	(Romania) A Voinea	7	6
(Spain) J Burillo	5	2
(United States) V Spadea	6	6^{4}	7^{7}
2	(Spain) À Corretja	3	7^{7}	6^{3}

Second round
6	(Spain) A Costa	1	2
(Uruguay) M Filippini	6	6
(Argentina) G Markus	6	7
(Colombia) M Hadad	1	5
Q	(Spain) JA Viloca	6^{2}	6	4
(Spain) F Clavet	7^{7}	3	6
Q	(Romania) A Voinea	6	2	6
(United States) V Spadea	1	6	2

Quarterfinals
(Uruguay) M Filippini	6	6
(Argentina) G Markus	4	2
(Spain) F Clavet	6	6
Q	(Romania) A Voinea	4	1

Semifinals
(Uruguay) M Filippini	5	3
(Spain) F Clavet	7	6
