= 1994 Torneo Internazionale Città di Firenze – Doubles =

Doubles
- 1994 Torneo Internazionale Città di Firenze

Final
- Champions: (Australia) Jon Ireland (United States) Kenny Thorne
- Runners-up: (United Kingdom) Neil Broad (United States) Greg Van Emburgh
- Score: 7–6, 6–3

Details
- Draw: 16 (2WC/1Q)
- Seeds: 4

Events
Singles	Doubles
- ATP Florence

Tomás Carbonell and Libor Pimek were the defending champions, but competed this year with different partners. Carbonell teamed up with Jorge Lozano and lost in the semifinals to Jon Ireland and Kenny Thorne, while Pimek teamed up with Donald Johnson and lost in the first round to qualifiers Rodolphe Gilbert and Gérard Solvès.

Jon Ireland and Kenny Thorne won the title by defeating Neil Broad and Greg Van Emburgh 7–6, 6–3 in the final.

== Seeds ==
1. (Netherlands) Menno Oosting / (Spain) Javier Sánchez (first round)
2. (United States) Donald Johnson / (Belgium) Libor Pimek (first round)
3. (Spain) Tomás Carbonell / (Mexico) Jorge Lozano (semifinals)
4. (United Kingdom) Neil Broad / (United States) Greg Van Emburgh (final)

== Draw ==
Key

- Q = Qualifier
- WC = Wild card
- LL = Lucky loser
- Alt = Alternate
- ITF = ITF entry
- PR = Protected ranking
- SR = Special ranking
- SE = Special exempt
- JE = Junior exempt
- JR = Junior Accelerator Programme entrant
- CO = College Accelerator Programme entrant
- NG = Next Gen Accelerator Program entrant
- w/o = Walkover
- r = Retired
- d = Defaulted

=== Draw ===
First round
1	(Netherlands) M Oosting (Spain) J Sánchez	4	6	5
WC	(Italy) O Camporese (Italy) S Pescosolido	6	3	7
(Uruguay) D Pérez (Germany) CU Steeb	2	2
(United States) S DeVries (United States) M Lucena	6	6
4	(United Kingdom) N Broad (United States) G Van Emburgh	6	4	6
(Uruguay) M Filippini (Sweden) N Kulti	3	6	2
(United States) R Schmidt (United States) J Waite	6	3	6
(Australia) W Arthurs (United States) T Mercer	3	6	3
(Latvia) Ģ Dzelde (Germany) M Huning	6	6
(Czech Republic) V Flégl (Australia) A Florent	3	3
WC	(Italy) P Canè (Italy) R Furlan	1	2
3	(Spain) T Carbonell (Mexico) J Lozano	6	6
(Argentina) H de la Peña (Argentina) J Garat	3	7	3
(Australia) J Ireland (United States) K Thorne	6	6	6
Q	(France) R Gilbert (France) G Solvès	7	6
2	(United States) D Johnson (Belgium) L Pimek	6	3

Quarterfinals
WC	(Italy) O Camporese (Italy) S Pescosolido	6	6
(United States) S DeVries (United States) M Lucena	2	4
4	(United Kingdom) N Broad (United States) G Van Emburgh	6	6
(United States) R Schmidt (United States) J Waite	1	4
(Latvia) Ģ Dzelde (Germany) M Huning	6	6
3	(Spain) T Carbonell (Mexico) J Lozano	7	7
(Australia) J Ireland (United States) K Thorne	6	5	6
Q	(France) R Gilbert (France) G Solvès	3	7	2

Semifinals
WC	(Italy) O Camporese (Italy) S Pescosolido	5	4
4	(United Kingdom) N Broad (United States) G Van Emburgh	7	6
3	(Spain) T Carbonell (Mexico) J Lozano	3	6	4
(Australia) J Ireland (United States) K Thorne	6	4	6

Final
4	(United Kingdom) N Broad (United States) G Van Emburgh	6	3
(Australia) J Ireland (United States) K Thorne	7	6
