= 1994 Torneo Internazionale Città di Firenze =

Tennis tournament in Florence, Italy

- Date: 6–12 June
- Edition: 22nd
- Category: World Series
- Draw: 32S / 16D
- Prize money: $288,750
- Surface: Clay / outdoor
- Location: Florence, Italy

Champions

Singles
- (Uruguay) Marcelo Filippini

Doubles
- (Australia) Jon Ireland / (United States) Kenny Thorne
- ATP Florence

The 1994 Torneo Internazionale Città di Firenze, also known as the Florence Classic, was a men's tennis tournament played on outdoor clay courts in Florence, Italy that was part of the World Series tier of the 1994 ATP Tour circuit. It was the 22nd and last edition of the tournament and was played from 6 June until 12 June 1994. Unseeded Marcelo Filippini won the singles title.

== Finals ==
=== Singles ===
(Uruguay) Marcelo Filippini defeated (Australia) Richard Fromberg 3–6, 6–3, 6–3

- It was Filippini's only singles title of the year and the 3rd of his career.

=== Doubles ===
(Australia) Jon Ireland / (United States) Kenny Thorne defeated (United Kingdom) Neil Broad / (United States) Greg Van Emburgh 7–6, 6–3

- It was Ireland's only doubles title of his career. It was Thorne's 2nd and last doubles title of the year and of his career.
