= 1991 Czechoslovak Open – Singles =

Singles
- 1991 Czechoslovak Open

Final
- Champion: (Czechoslovakia) Karel Nováček
- Runner-up: (Sweden) Magnus Gustafsson
- Score: 7–6^{(7–5)}, 6–2

Details
- Draw: 32 (3WC/4Q)
- Seeds: 8

Events
Singles	Doubles
← 1990 ·	Prague Open	· 1992 →

The 1991 PCzechoslovak Open was a men's tennis tournament played on Clay in Prague, Czech Republic that was part of the International Series of the 1991 ATP Tour. Jordi Arrese was the defending champion but lost in the second round to Thomas Muster.

Karel Nováček won the title by defeating Magnus Gustafsson 7–6^{(7–5)}, 6–2 in the final.

== Seeds ==
1. (Sweden) Magnus Gustafsson (final)
2. (Czechoslovakia) Karel Nováček (champion)
3. (Socialist Federal Republic of Yugoslavia) Goran Prpić (first round)
4. (Austria) Horst Skoff (quarterfinals)
5. (Spain) Jordi Arrese (second round)
6. (Argentina) Guillermo Pérez Roldán (semifinals)
7. (Argentina) Horacio de la Peña (quarterfinals)
8. (Sweden) Nicklas Kulti (first round)

== Draw ==
=== Key ===
- Q = Qualifier
- WC = Wild card
- LL = Lucky loser
- Alt = Alternate
- SE = Special exempt
- PR = Protected ranking
- ITF = ITF entry
- JE = Junior exempt
- w/o = Walkover
- r = Retired
- d = Defaulted
- SR = Special ranking

=== Finals ===
Semifinals
1	(Sweden) Magnus Gustafsson	7	6^{5}	6
6	(Argentina) Guillermo Pérez Roldán	5	7^{7}	2
(Austria) Thomas Muster	1	6	5
2	(Czechoslovakia) Karel Nováček	6	2	7

Final
1	(Sweden) Magnus Gustafsson	6^{5}	2
2	(Czechoslovakia) Karel Nováček	7^{7}	6

=== Top half ===
First round
1	(Sweden) M Gustafsson	6	6
Q	(Czechoslovakia) Lukas Thomas	3	2
(Uruguay) M Filippini	1	2
(Spain) C Costa	6	6
(Chile) P Rebolledo	4	1
Q	(Czechoslovakia) L Pimek	6	6
(France) A Boetsch	6	6
8	(Sweden) N Kulti	1	4
4	(Austria) H Skoff	6	6
WC	(Czechoslovakia) R Vašek	1	1
(Ukraine) D Poliakov	3	6	6
Q	(Czechoslovakia) M Trněný	6	3	2
(Argentina) R Azar	4	4
(Germany) CU Steeb	6	6
(Spain) JF Altur	4	4
6	(Argentina) G Pérez Roldán	6	6

Second round
1	(Sweden) M Gustafsson	6	6
(Spain) C Costa	4	1
Q	(Czechoslovakia) L Pimek	2	3
(France) A Boetsch	6	6
4	(Austria) H Skoff	6	6
(Ukraine) D Poliakov	4	1
(Germany) CU Steeb	4	0
6	(Argentina) G Pérez Roldán	6	6

Quarterfinals
1	(Sweden) M Gustafsson	6	6
(France) A Boetsch	2	2
4	(Austria) H Skoff	6	4	6^{2}
6	(Argentina) G Pérez Roldán	3	6	7^{7}

Semifinals
1	(Sweden) M Gustafsson	7	6^{5}	6
6	(Argentina) G Pérez Roldán	5	7^{7}	2

=== Bottom half ===
First round
5	(Spain) J Arrese	6	6
(Argentina) F Davín	2	2
(Italy) D Nargiso	4	2
(Austria) T Muster	6	6
Q	(Germany) P Vojtíšek	5	3
WC	(Czechoslovakia) K Kučera	7	6
(Sweden) M Larsson	6	6
3	(Socialist Federal Republic of Yugoslavia) G Prpić	2	4
7	(Argentina) H de la Peña	6^{3}	6	6
(Peru) P Arraya	7^{7}	0	2
(Spain) J Aguilera	6	6
WC	(Czechoslovakia) J Kodeš Jr.	3	4
(Russia) A Olhovskiy	6^{3}	7	4
(Italy) R Furlan	7^{7}	5	6
(Finland) V Paloheimo	4	3
2	(Czechoslovakia) K Nováček	6	6

Second round
5	(Spain) J Arrese	2	3
(Austria) T Muster	6	6
WC	(Czechoslovakia) K Kučera	1	0
(Sweden) M Larsson	6	6
7	(Argentina) H de la Peña	6	6
(Spain) J Aguilera	2	3
(Italy) R Furlan	6	4	6^{5}
2	(Czechoslovakia) K Nováček	4	6	7^{7}

Quarterfinals
(Austria) T Muster	6	6
(Sweden) M Larsson	3	0
7	(Argentina) H de la Peña	0	4
2	(Czechoslovakia) K Nováček	6	6

Semifinals
(Austria) T Muster	1	6	5
2	(Czechoslovakia) K Nováček	6	2	7
