= 1995 Grand Prix Hassan II – Doubles =

Doubles
- 1995 Grand Prix Hassan II

Final
- Champions: (Spain) Tomás Carbonell (Spain) Francisco Roig
- Runners-up: (Portugal) Emanuel Couto (Portugal) João Cunha e Silva
- Score: 6–4, 6–1

Details
- Draw: 16
- Seeds: 4

Events
Singles	Doubles
← 1994 ·	Grand Prix Hassan II	· 1996 →

David Adams and Menno Oosting were the defending champions, but did not participate this year.

Tomás Carbonell and Francisco Roig won in the final 6–4, 7–6, against Emanuel Couto and João Cunha e Silva.

== Seeds ==
1. (Spain) Tomás Carbonell / (Spain) Francisco Roig (champions)
2. (Portugal) Emanuel Couto / (Portugal) João Cunha e Silva (final)
3. (Australia) Wayne Arthurs / (Australia) Jon Ireland (semifinals)
4. (Spain) Jordi Arrese / (Spain) José Antonio Conde (semifinals)

== Draw ==
=== Key ===
- Q = Qualifier
- WC = Wild card
- LL = Lucky loser
- Alt = Alternate
- ITF = ITF entry
- PR = Protected ranking
- SR = Special ranking
- SE = Special exempt
- JE = Junior exempt
- JR = Junior Accelerator Programme entrant
- CO = College Accelerator Programme entrant
- NG = Next Gen Accelerator Program entrant
- w/o = Walkover
- r = Retired
- d = Defaulted

=== Draw ===
First round
1	(Spain) T Carbonell (Spain) F Roig	3	7	7
(Belgium) F Dewulf (Germany) M-K Goellner	6	5	6
(Morocco) K Alami (Italy) F Mordegan	3	2
(Italy) C Brandi (Italy) S Pescosolido	6	6
3	(Australia) W Arthurs (Australia) J Ireland	6	1	7
Q	(Spain) MA Gorriz (Spain) A Portas	4	6	5
(Hungary) G Köves (Hungary) A Lányi	6	3	6
(Spain) E Benfele Álvarez (Spain) Á López Morón	1	6	7
(United States) J Belloli (Portugal) N Marques	6	7	6
(Latvia) Ģ Dzelde (Portugal) B Mota	7	5	3
WC	(Morocco) M Ridaoui (Morocco) T Ouahabi	1	0
4	(Spain) J Arrese (Spain) JA Conde	6	6
(Germany) M Huning (Germany) M Zumpft	4	6
WC	(Argentina) F Davín (Morocco) Y El Aynaoui	6	7
WC	(Morocco) H Arazi (Morocco) M Tahiri	2	1^{r}
2	(Portugal) J Cunha e Silva (Portugal) E Couto	6	3

Quarterfinals
1	(Spain) T Carbonell (Spain) F Roig	6	6
(Italy) C Brandi (Italy) S Pescosolido	4	2
3	(Australia) W Arthurs (Australia) J Ireland	7	6
(Spain) E Benfele Álvarez (Spain) Á López Morón	6	4
(United States) J Belloli (Portugal) N Marques	6	5
4	(Spain) J Arrese (Spain) JA Conde	7	7
WC	(Argentina) F Davín (Morocco) Y El Aynaoui	6	0
2	(Portugal) J Cunha e Silva (Portugal) E Couto	7	6

Semifinals
1	(Spain) T Carbonell (Spain) F Roig	6	6
3	(Australia) W Arthurs (Australia) J Ireland	2	3
4	(Spain) J Arrese (Spain) JA Conde	6	3	2
2	(Portugal) J Cunha e Silva (Portugal) E Couto	4	6	6

Final
1	(Spain) T Carbonell (Spain) F Roig	6	6
2	(Portugal) J Cunha e Silva (Portugal) E Couto	4	1
