= 1992 Trofeo Kim Top Line =

Tennis tournament in Florence, Italy

- Date: 8–14 June
- Edition: 20th
- Category: World Series
- Draw: 32S / 16D
- Prize money: $235,000
- Surface: Clay / outdoor
- Location: Florence, Italy

Champions

Singles
- (Austria) Thomas Muster

Doubles
- (Uruguay) Marcelo Filippini / (Brazil) Luiz Mattar
- ATP Florence

The 1992 Trofeo Kim Top Line, also known as the ATP Florence, was a men's tennis tournament played on outdoor clay courts in Florence, Italy that was part of the World Series tier of the 1992 ATP Tour circuit. It was the 20th edition of the tournament and was played from 8 June until 14 June 1992. First-seeded Thomas Muster, who entered the main draw on a wildcard, won his second consecutive singles title at the event.

== Finals ==
=== Singles ===
(Austria) Thomas Muster defeated (Italy) Renzo Furlan 6–3, 1–6, 6–1

- It was Muster's 2nd singles title of the year and the 12nd of his career.

=== Doubles ===
(Uruguay) Marcelo Filippini / (Brazil) Luiz Mattar defeated (South Africa) Royce Deppe / (South Africa) Brent Haygarth 6–4, 6–7, 6–4

- It was Filippini's only doubles title of the year and the 2nd of his career. It was Mattar's only doubles title of the year and the 4th of his career.
