= 1993 Skoda Czech Open – Doubles =

Doubles
- 1993 Skoda Czech Open

Final
- Champions: (Netherlands) Hendrik Jan Davids (Belgium) Libor Pimek
- Runners-up: (Mexico) Jorge Lozano (Brazil) Jaime Oncins
- Score: 6–3, 7–6

Events
Singles	Doubles
← 1992 ·	Prague Open	· 1994 →

The 1993 Skoda Czech Open was a men's tennis tournament played on Clay in Prague, Czech Republic that was part of the International Series of the 1993 ATP Tour. Karel Nováček and Vojtěch Flégl were the defending champions, but Nováček did not compete this year. Flégl teamed up with Cyril Suk and lost in the quarterfinals to Doug Eisenman and Donald Johnson.

Hendrik Jan Davids and Libor Pimek won the title by defeating Jorge Lozano and Jaime Oncins 6–3, 7–6 in the final.

== Seeds ==
1. (Czech Republic) Vojtěch Flégl / (Czech Republic) Cyril Suk (quarterfinals)
2. (Netherlands) Hendrik Jan Davids / (Belgium) Libor Pimek (champions)
3. (Czech Republic) Martin Damm / (Czech Republic) David Rikl (first round)
4. (Germany) David Prinosil / (Czech Republic) Richard Vogel (quarterfinals)

== Draw ==
=== Key ===
- Q = Qualifier
- WC = Wild card
- LL = Lucky loser
- Alt = Alternate
- ITF = ITF entry
- PR = Protected ranking
- SR = Special ranking
- SE = Special exempt
- JE = Junior exempt
- JR = Junior Accelerator Programme entrant
- CO = College Accelerator Programme entrant
- NG = Next Gen Accelerator Program entrant
- w/o = Walkover
- r = Retired
- d = Defaulted

=== Draw ===
First round
1	(Czech Republic) V Flégl (Czech Republic) C Suk	6	6
Q	(Czechoslovakia) R Vašek (Czechoslovakia) P Vízner	4	3
WC	(Czech Republic) M Šrejber (Czech Republic) B Ulihrach	6	4
(United States) D Eisenman (United States) D Johnson	7	6
3	(Czech Republic) M Damm (Czech Republic) D Rikl	6	2	3
WC	(Czech Republic) S Doseděl (Czech Republic) J Novák	4	6	6
(Australia) J Ireland (Sweden) T Nydahl	6	6	5
(Mexico) J Lozano (Brazil) J Oncins	4	7	7
(Russia) A Cherkasov (Latvia) Ģ Dzelde	3	6	6
(Czech Republic) J Kodeš Jr. (Czech Republic) T Zdražila	6	1	7
(United States) R Benson (United States) J Yancey	2	4
4	(Germany) D Prinosil (Czech Republic) R Vogel	6	6
(United States) B Devening (Denmark) M Mortensen	6	6
(Australia) C Limberger (Australia) S Youl	7	7
(Sweden) R Båthman (Sweden) N Kulti	6	6	6
2	(Netherlands) HJ Davids (Belgium) L Pimek	7	4	7

Quarterfinals
1	(Czech Republic) V Flégl (Czech Republic) C Suk	6	3	6
(United States) D Eisenman (United States) D Johnson	3	6	7
WC	(Czech Republic) S Doseděl (Czech Republic) J Novák	4	0
(Mexico) J Lozano (Brazil) J Oncins	6	6
(Czech Republic) J Kodeš Jr. (Czech Republic) T Zdražila	6	6
4	(Germany) D Prinosil (Czech Republic) R Vogel	2	2
(Australia) C Limberger (Australia) S Youl	7	5	4
2	(Netherlands) HJ Davids (Belgium) L Pimek	6	7	6

Semifinals
(United States) D Eisenman (United States) D Johnson	4	1
(Mexico) J Lozano (Brazil) J Oncins	6	6
(Czech Republic) J Kodeš Jr. (Czech Republic) T Zdražila	3	0
2	(Netherlands) HJ Davids (Belgium) L Pimek	6	6

Final
(Mexico) J Lozano (Brazil) J Oncins	3	6
2	(Netherlands) HJ Davids (Belgium) L Pimek	6	7
