= 1990 Czechoslovak Open – Doubles =

Doubles
- 1990 Czechoslovak Open

Final
- Champions: (Czechoslovakia) Vojtěch Flégl (Czechoslovakia) Daniel Vacek
- Runners-up: (Romania) George Cosac (Romania) Florin Segărceanu
- Score: 5–7, 6–4, 6–3

Details
- Draw: 16 (1Q)
- Seeds: 4

Events
Singles	Doubles
← 1989 ·	Prague Open (1987–1999)	· 1991 →

Jordi Arrese and Horst Skoff were the defending champions, but competed this year with different partners. Arrese teamed up with Stefano Pescosolido and lost in the quarterfinals to Tomáš Šmíd and Cyril Suk, while Skoff teamed up with Francisco Clavet and lost in the first round to Marcelo Filippini and Marián Vajda.

Vojtěch Flégl and Daniel Vacek won the title by defeating George Cosac and Florin Segărceanu 5–7, 6–4, 6–3 in the final.

== Seeds ==
1. (Czechoslovakia) Tomáš Šmíd / (Czechoslovakia) Cyril Suk (semifinals)
2. (Argentina) Horacio de la Peña / (Venezuela) Alfonso Mora (first round)
3. (Germany) Udo Riglewski / (Czechoslovakia) Tomáš Anzari (quarterfinals)
4. (Spain) Francisco Clavet / (Austria) Horst Skoff (quarterfinals)

== Draw ==
=== Key ===
- Q = Qualifier
- WC = Wild card
- LL = Lucky loser
- Alt = Alternate
- ITF = ITF entry
- PR = Protected ranking
- SR = Special ranking
- SE = Special exempt
- JE = Junior exempt
- JR = Junior Accelerator Programme entrant
- CO = College Accelerator Programme entrant
- NG = Next Gen Accelerator Program entrant
- w/o = Walkover
- r = Retired
- d = Defaulted

=== Draw ===
First round
1	(Czechoslovakia) T Šmíd (Czechoslovakia) C Suk	7	6
(Czechoslovakia) B Stankovič (Czechoslovakia) R Vogel	6	4
(Spain) J Arrese (Italy) S Pescosolido	6	6
(Sweden) L Jönsson (Sweden) M Nilsson	3	4
4	(Spain) F Clavet (Austria) H Skoff	3	4
(Uruguay) M Filippini (Czechoslovakia) M Vajda	6	6
(Romania) G Cosac (Romania) F Segărceanu	6	6
Q	(Argentina) F Davín (Socialist Federal Republic of Yugoslavia) S Hiršzon	4	2
(Czechoslovakia) V Flégl (Czechoslovakia) D Vacek	6	6
(Czechoslovakia) M Damm (Czechoslovakia) J Kodeš Jr.	3	2
(France) T Benhabiles (France) C Pioline	1	6	4
3	(Germany) U Riglewski (Czechoslovakia) T Anzari	6	4	6
(Sweden) N Kulti (Sweden) M Larsson	6	6
(Argentina) R Azar (Sweden) M Nilsson	2	1
(Czechoslovakia) S Doseděl (Socialist Federal Republic of Yugoslavia) G Prpić	7	6
2	(Argentina) H de la Peña (Venezuela) A Mora	5	3

Quarterfinals
1	(Czechoslovakia) T Šmíd (Czechoslovakia) C Suk	6	4	6
(Spain) J Arrese (Italy) S Pescosolido	4	6	4
(Uruguay) M Filippini (Czechoslovakia) M Vajda	4	3
(Romania) G Cosac (Romania) F Segărceanu	6	6
(Czechoslovakia) V Flégl (Czechoslovakia) D Vacek	7	7
3	(Germany) U Riglewski (Czechoslovakia) T Anzari	6	6
(Sweden) N Kulti (Sweden) M Larsson	7	6	1
(Czechoslovakia) S Doseděl (Socialist Federal Republic of Yugoslavia) G Prpić	5	7	6

Semifinals
1	(Czechoslovakia) T Šmíd (Czechoslovakia) C Suk	4	2
(Romania) G Cosac (Romania) F Segărceanu	6	6
(Czechoslovakia) V Flégl (Czechoslovakia) D Vacek	6	7
(Czechoslovakia) S Doseděl (Socialist Federal Republic of Yugoslavia) G Prpić	2	6

Final
(Romania) G Cosac (Romania) F Segărceanu	7	4	3
(Czechoslovakia) V Flégl (Czechoslovakia) D Vacek	5	6	6
