= 1992 Skoda Czechoslovak Open – Doubles =

Doubles
- 1992 Skoda Czechoslovak Open

Final
- Champions: (Czechoslovakia) Karel Nováček (Czechoslovakia) Branislav Stankovič
- Runners-up: (Sweden) Jonas Björkman (Australia) Jon Ireland
- Score: 7–5, 6–1

Events
Singles	Doubles
← 1991 ·	Prague Open	· 1993 →

Vojtěch Flégl and Cyril Suk were the defending champions, but lost in the first round to Renzo Furlan and Guillermo Pérez Roldán.

Karel Nováček and Branislav Stankovič won the title by defeating Jonas Björkman and Jon Ireland 7–5, 6–1 in the final.

== Seeds ==
1. (Czechoslovakia) Vojtěch Flégl / (Czechoslovakia) Cyril Suk (first round)
2. (Czechoslovakia) Libor Pimek / (Kenya) Paul Wekesa (first round)
3. (Czechoslovakia) Martin Damm / (Czechoslovakia) David Rikl (quarterfinals)
4. (Sweden) Per Henricsson / (Sweden) Ola Jonsson (first round)

== Draw ==
=== Key ===
- Q = Qualifier
- WC = Wild card
- LL = Lucky loser
- Alt = Alternate
- ITF = ITF entry
- PR = Protected ranking
- SR = Special ranking
- SE = Special exempt
- JE = Junior exempt
- JR = Junior Accelerator Programme entrant
- CO = College Accelerator Programme entrant
- NG = Next Gen Accelerator Program entrant
- w/o = Walkover
- r = Retired
- d = Defaulted

=== Draw ===
First round
1	(Czechoslovakia) V Flégl (Czechoslovakia) C Suk	6	4
WC	(Italy) R Furlan (Argentina) G Pérez Roldán	7	6
(Italy) C Brandi (Italy) F Mordegan	1	4
(Czechoslovakia) K Nováček (Czechoslovakia) B Stankovič	6	6
4	(Sweden) P Henricsson (Sweden) O Jonsson	6	4
(United States) B Devening (Australia) R Fromberg	7	6
(Spain) J Arrese (Spain) M Górriz	3	4
(Germany) D Prinosil (Czechoslovakia) R Vogel	6	6
Q	(Georgia (country)) V Gabrichidze (Georgia (country)) David Katcharava	6	2
(Sweden) J Björkman (Australia) J Ireland	7	6
(Czechoslovakia) J Čihák (Latvia) Ģ Dzelde	3	6	6
3	(Czechoslovakia) M Damm (Czechoslovakia) D Rikl	6	4	7
(New Zealand) S Guy (Czechoslovakia) M Střelba	6	6
WC	(Czechoslovakia) P Složil (Czechoslovakia) T Šmíd	1	4
(Sweden) J Apell (Sweden) J Donar	3	7	6
2	(Czechoslovakia) L Pimek (Kenya) P Wekesa	6	6	3

Quarterfinals
WC	(Italy) R Furlan (Argentina) G Pérez Roldán	4	4
(Czechoslovakia) K Nováček (Czechoslovakia) B Stankovič	6	6
(United States) B Devening (Australia) R Fromberg	3	7	7
(Germany) D Prinosil (Czechoslovakia) R Vogel	6	6	6
(Sweden) J Björkman (Australia) J Ireland	5	7	6
3	(Czechoslovakia) M Damm (Czechoslovakia) D Rikl	7	6	2
(New Zealand) S Guy (Czechoslovakia) M Střelba	2	6	5
(Sweden) J Apell (Sweden) J Donar	6	1	7

Semifinals
(Czechoslovakia) K Nováček (Czechoslovakia) B Stankovič	6	6
(United States) B Devening (Australia) R Fromberg	4	2
(Sweden) J Björkman (Australia) J Ireland	6	6
(Sweden) J Apell (Sweden) J Donar	2	4

Final
(Czechoslovakia) K Nováček (Czechoslovakia) B Stankovič	7	6
(Sweden) J Björkman (Australia) J Ireland	5	1
