= 1997 Grand Prix Hassan II – Singles =

Singles
- 1997 Grand Prix Hassan II

Final
- Champion: (Morocco) Hicham Arazi
- Runner-up: (Argentina) Franco Squillari
- Score: 3–6, 6–1, 6–2

Details
- Draw: 32
- Seeds: 8

Events
Singles	Doubles
← 1996 ·	Grand Prix Hassan II	· 1998 →

Tomás Carbonell was the defending champion but lost in the quarterfinals to Gilbert Schaller.

Hicham Arazi won in the final 3–6, 6–1, 6–2 against Franco Squillari.

== Seeds ==
1. (Morocco) Karim Alami (semifinals)
2. (Morocco) Hicham Arazi (champion)
3. (Spain) Roberto Carretero (first round)
4. (Austria) Gilbert Schaller (semifinals)
5. (Australia) Richard Fromberg (second round)
6. (Spain) Tomás Carbonell (quarterfinals)
7. (Germany) Oliver Gross (second round)
8. (Spain) Emilio Benfele Álvarez (quarterfinals)

== Draw ==
=== Key ===
- Q = Qualifier
- WC = Wild card
- LL = Lucky loser
- Alt = Alternate
- ITF = ITF entry
- PR = Protected ranking
- SR = Special ranking
- SE = Special exempt
- JE = Junior exempt
- JR = Junior Accelerator Programme entrant
- CO = College Accelerator Programme entrant
- NG = Next Gen Accelerator Program entrant
- w/o = Walkover
- r = Retired
- d = Defaulted

=== Finals ===
Semifinals
1	(Morocco) Karim Alami	3	3
(Argentina) Franco Squillari	6	6
4	(Austria) Gilbert Schaller	2	6^{5}
2	(Morocco) Hicham Arazi	6	7^{7}

Final
(Argentina) Franco Squillari	6	1	2
2	(Morocco) Hicham Arazi	3	6	6

=== Top half ===
First round
1	(Morocco) K Alami	6	6
(France) G Solvès	4	3
Q	(Germany) M Craca	6	6
(Israel) E Ran	4	2
(Spain) F Vicente	7^{7}	6
(Portugal) N Marques	6^{0}	1
(Romania) A Pavel	3	3
7	(Germany) O Gross	6	6
3	(Spain) R Carretero	3	1
(Argentina) F Squillari	6	6
Q	(Spain) J A Marín	6	6
WC	(Morocco) L Rharnit	3	1
(Morocco) Y El Aynaoui	6	7^{7}
(Uzbekistan) O Ogorodov	4	6^{3}
(Bulgaria) O Stanoytchev	7^{7}	2	2
5	(Australia) R Fromberg	6^{4}	6	6

Second round
1	(Morocco) K Alami	7	7^{7}
Q	(Germany) M Craca	5	6^{1}
(Spain) F Vicente	w/o
7	(Germany) O Gross
(Argentina) F Squillari	6	7
Q	(Spain) J A Marín	1	5
(Morocco) Y El Aynaoui	7^{7}	6
5	(Australia) R Fromberg	6^{1}	0

Quarter-finals
1	(Morocco) K Alami	6^{3}	6	7
(Spain) F Vicente	7^{7}	1	5
(Argentina) F Squillari	6	6
(Morocco) Y El Aynaoui	4	1

Semi-finals
1	(Morocco) K Alami	3	3
(Argentina) F Squillari	6	6

=== Bottom half ===
First round
6	(Spain) T Carbonell	6	4	7^{7}
(Sweden) T Nydahl	2	6	6^{5}
(Russia) A Cherkasov	0	6	4
Q	(Portugal) B Mota	6	1	6
Q	(Spain) A Martín	6	6
(Spain) F Roig	1	4
(Egypt) T El-Sawy	6^{2}	3
4	(Austria) G Schaller	7^{7}	6
8	(Spain) E Benfele Álvarez	6	6
WC	(Morocco) M El Aarej	0	2
(Sweden) L Jonsson	7	7^{7}
(Spain) J Burillo	5	6^{5}
(Czech Republic) D Škoch	6	6
WC	(Morocco) M Tahiri	1	2
(Hungary) J Krocsko	3	1
2	(Morocco) H Arazi	6	6

Second round
6	(Spain) T Carbonell	6	6
Q	(Portugal) B Mota	2	0
Q	(Spain) A Martín	3	1
4	(Austria) G Schaller	6	6
8	(Spain) E Benfele Álvarez	6	7^{7}
(Sweden) L Jonsson	2	6^{5}
(Czech Republic) D Škoch	3	3
2	(Morocco) H Arazi	6	6

Quarter-finals
6	(Spain) T Carbonell	4	4
4	(Austria) G Schaller	6	6
8	(Spain) E Benfele Álvarez	2	1
2	(Morocco) H Arazi	6	6

Semi-finals
4	(Austria) G Schaller	2	6^{5}
2	(Morocco) H Arazi	6	7^{7}
