= 1994 Grand Prix Hassan II – Singles =

Singles
- 1994 Grand Prix Hassan II

Final
- Champion: (Italy) Renzo Furlan
- Runner-up: (Morocco) Karim Alami
- Score: 6–2, 6–2

Details
- Draw: 32
- Seeds: 8

Events
Singles	Doubles
- Grand Prix Hassan II

The 1994 Grand Prix Hassan II men's singles competition. Renzo Furlan was the champion, defeating Karim Alami 6–2, 6–2. Guillermo Pérez Roldán was the defending champion.

== Seeds ==
1. (Italy) Renzo Furlan (champion)
2. (Morocco) Younes El Aynaoui (semifinals)
3. (Austria) Gilbert Schaller (quarterfinals)
4. (Spain) Àlex Corretja (first round)
5. (Spain) Jordi Arrese (second round)
6. (Italy) Andrea Gaudenzi (second round)
7. (Czech Republic) Sláva Doseděl (first round)
8. (Austria) Horst Skoff (first round)

== Draw ==
Key

- Q = Qualifier
- WC = Wild card
- LL = Lucky loser
- Alt = Alternate
- ITF = ITF entry
- PR = Protected ranking
- SR = Special ranking
- SE = Special exempt
- JE = Junior exempt
- JR = Junior Accelerator Programme entrant
- CO = College Accelerator Programme entrant
- NG = Next Gen Accelerator Program entrant
- w/o = Walkover
- r = Retired
- d = Defaulted

=== Finals ===
Semifinals
1	(Italy) Renzo Furlan	6	3	6
3	(Austria) Gilbert Schaller	3	6	1
(Morocco) Karim Alami	6	6
2	(Morocco) Younes El Aynaoui	4	4

Final
1	(Italy) Renzo Furlan	6	6
(Morocco) Karim Alami	2	2

=== Section 1 ===
First round
1	(Italy) R Furlan	6	6
(Argentina) G Markus	1	4
(Argentina) H de la Peña	6	6
WC	(Morocco) M Tahiri	3	0
(France) G Solvès	6	7^{7}
WC	(Morocco) H Arazi	0	6^{5}
(Spain) T Carbonell	6	6
7	(Czech Republic) S Doseděl	3	1
3	(Austria) G Schaller	6	6
(Spain) F Clavet	3	4
(France) F Santoro	3	3
(Uruguay) M Filippini	6	6
(Italy) G Pozzi	2	6	5
Q	(Germany) M Sinner	6	3	7
(Argentina) D Orsanic	3	3
6	(Italy) A Gaudenzi	6	6

Second round
1	(Italy) R Furlan	4	6	6
(Argentina) H de la Peña	6	2	1
(France) G Solvès	6^{5}	2
(Spain) T Carbonell	7^{7}	6
3	(Austria) G Schaller	6	2	6
(Uruguay) M Filippini	3	6	2
Q	(Germany) M Sinner	6	3	6
(Italy) A Gaudenzi	2	6	2

Quarter-finals
1	(Italy) R Furlan	4
(Spain) T Carbonell	2^{r}
3	(Austria) G Schaller	6	6
Q	(Germany) M Sinner	1	1

Semi-finals
1	(Italy) R Furlan	6	3	6
3	(Austria) G Schaller	3	6	1

=== Section 2 ===
First round
5	(Spain) J Arrese	6	6
Q	(Spain) G Puentes	3	2
(Morocco) K Alami	6	6
WC	(United States) M Ridaoui	4	2
(Sweden) L Jonsson	6	6
(Germany) L Rehmann	2	3
(Ukraine) D Poliakov	3	6	7
4	(Spain) À Corretja	6	2	5
8	(Austria) H Skoff	4	5
(Argentina) F Davín	6	7
Q	(Spain) O Martinez	3	6	7
(Germany) C-U Steeb	6	1	5
(Sweden) T Nydahl	6	6
(Germany) M Naewie	1	2
Q	(Czech Republic) D Prchlik	1	4
2	(Morocco) Y El Aynaoui	6	6

Second round
5	(Spain) J Arrese	2	6^{5}
(Morocco) K Alami	6	7^{7}
(Sweden) L Jonsson	6	5	4
(Ukraine) D Poliakov	1	7	6
(Argentina) F Davín	6^{5}	6	4
Q	(Spain) O Martinez	7^{5}	3	6
(Sweden) T Nydahl	2	6^{4}
2	(Morocco) Y El Aynaoui	6	7^{7}

Quarter-finals
(Morocco) K Alami	6	6
(Ukraine) D Poliakov	2	4
Q	(Spain) O Martinez	3	3
2	(Morocco) Y El Aynaoui	6	6

Semi-finals
(Morocco) K Alami	6	6
2	(Morocco) Y El Aynaoui	4	4
