= 1996 Grand Prix Hassan II – Singles =

Singles
- 1996 Grand Prix Hassan II

Final
- Champion: (Spain) Tomás Carbonell
- Runner-up: (Austria) Gilbert Schaller
- Score: 7–5, 1–6, 6–2

Details
- Draw: 32
- Seeds: 8

Events
Singles	Doubles
← 1995 ·	Grand Prix Hassan II	· 1997 →

Gilbert Schaller was the defending champion but lost in the final 7–5, 1–6, 6–2 against Tomás Carbonell.

== Seeds ==
1. (Austria) Gilbert Schaller (final)
2. (Czech Republic) Bohdan Ulihrach (first round)
3. (Spain) Carlos Costa (second round)
4. (Czech Republic) Jiří Novák (quarterfinals)
5. (Spain) Alberto Berasategui (semifinals)
6. (Spain) Jordi Burillo (second round)
7. n/a
8. (Spain) Jordi Arrese (first round)

== Draw ==
=== Key ===
- Q = Qualifier
- WC = Wild card
- LL = Lucky loser
- Alt = Alternate
- ITF = ITF entry
- PR = Protected ranking
- SR = Special ranking
- SE = Special exempt
- JE = Junior exempt
- JR = Junior Accelerator Programme entrant
- CO = College Accelerator Programme entrant
- NG = Next Gen Accelerator Program entrant
- w/o = Walkover
- r = Retired
- d = Defaulted

=== Finals ===
Semifinals
1	(Austria) Gilbert Schaller	7^{10}	7
5	(Spain) Alberto Berasategui	6^{8}	5
(Spain) Tomás Carbonell	6	4	6
(Russia) Andrei Chesnokov	4	6	1

Final
1	(Austria) Gilbert Schaller	5	6	2
(Spain) Tomás Carbonell	7	1	6

=== Top half ===
First round
1	(Austria) G Schaller	2	6	6
LL	(France) T Champion	6	1	1
(Germany) O Gross	2	5
(Germany) M-K Goellner	6	7
(Australia) R Fromberg	6	6
(France) J Golmard	0	4
(Portugal) J Cunha e Silva	6	6
8	(Spain) J Arrese	2	4
4	(Czech Republic) J Novák	6	6
(Hungary) S Noszály	1	2
Q	(Belgium) K Goossens	6	3	4
Q	(Italy) F Maggi	3	6	6
(France) F Santoro	2	6^{5}
WC	(Morocco) H Arazi	6	7^{7}
(Uruguay) M Filippini	2	3
5	(Spain) A Berasategui	6	6

Second round
1	(Austria) G Schaller	7	6^{3}	6
(Germany) M-K Goellner	5	7^{7}	4
(Australia) R Fromberg	6	6
(Portugal) J Cunha e Silva	4	4
4	(Czech Republic) J Novák	7^{7}	6
Q	(Italy) F Maggi	6^{4}	3
WC	(Morocco) H Arazi	1	3
5	(Spain) A Berasategui	6	6

Quarter-finals
1	(Austria) G Schaller	4	6	6
(Australia) R Fromberg	6	4	2
4	(Czech Republic) J Novák	3	4
5	(Spain) A Berasategui	6	6

Semi-finals
1	(Austria) G Schaller	7^{10}	7
5	(Spain) A Berasategui	6^{8}	5

=== Bottom half ===
First round
6	(Spain) J Burillo	6	6
(Norway) C Ruud	2	1
(Czech Republic) D Rikl	6	6^{2}	0
(Spain) T Carbonell	4	7^{7}	6
(Sweden) M Norman	6	7^{7}
(Germany) P Baur	3	6^{1}
Q	(Spain) J A Marín	1	1
3	(Spain) C Costa	6	6
LL	(Egypt) T El-Sawy	6	6
(Portugal) N Marques	1	3
(Russia) A Chesnokov	6	3	6
(United States) J Palmer	1	6	4
Q	(Spain) R Carretero	4	2
(Spain) F Mantilla	6	6
(Spain) C Moyá	7	6
2	(Czech Republic) B Ulihrach	5	0

Second round
6	(Spain) J Burillo	6	4	1
(Spain) T Carbonell	3	6	6
(Sweden) M Norman	6	6^{4}	6
3	(Spain) C Costa	4	7^{7}	2
LL	(Egypt) T El-Sawy	3	0
(Russia) A Chesnokov	6	6
(Spain) F Mantilla	1	6^{8}
(Spain) C Moyá	6	7^{10}

Quarter-finals
(Spain) T Carbonell	6	6
(Sweden) M Norman	3	2
(Russia) A Chesnokov	6	6
(Spain) C Moyá	4	3

Semi-finals
(Spain) T Carbonell	6	4	6
(Russia) A Chesnokov	4	6	1
