= 1995 Grand Prix Hassan II – Singles =

Singles
- 1995 Grand Prix Hassan II

Final
- Champion: (Austria) Gilbert Schaller
- Runner-up: (Spain) Álbert Costa
- Score: 6–4, 6–2

Details
- Draw: 32
- Seeds: 8

Events
Singles	Doubles
← 1994 ·	Grand Prix Hassan II	· 1996 →

Renzo Furlan was the defending champion, but did not participate this year.

Gilbert Schaller won the title, defeating Álbert Costa 6–4, 6–2 in the final.

== Seeds ==
1. (Austria) Gilbert Schaller (champion)
2. (Spain) Álbert Costa (final)
3. (Slovakia) Karol Kučera (first round)
4. (Spain) Tomás Carbonell (quarterfinals)
5. (Argentina) Franco Davín (second round)
6. (Spain) Oscar Martinez (first round)
7. (Spain) Jordi Arrese (first round)
8. (Germany) Marc-Kevin Goellner (quarterfinals)

== Draw ==
=== Key ===
- Q = Qualifier
- WC = Wild card
- LL = Lucky loser
- Alt = Alternate
- ITF = ITF entry
- PR = Protected ranking
- SR = Special ranking
- SE = Special exempt
- JE = Junior exempt
- JR = Junior Accelerator Programme entrant
- CO = College Accelerator Programme entrant
- NG = Next Gen Accelerator Program entrant
- w/o = Walkover
- r = Retired
- d = Defaulted

=== Finals ===
Semifinals
1	(Austria) Gilbert Schaller	6	6
(Netherlands) Sjeng Schalken	4	4
Q	(Spain) Álex López Morón	3	2
2	(Spain) Álbert Costa	6	6

Final
1	(Austria) Gilbert Schaller	6	6
2	(Spain) Álbert Costa	4	2

=== Top half ===
First round
1	(Austria) G Schaller	6	6
(Spain) J Burillo	4	3
(Spain) E Benfele Álvarez	7^{7}	6
(France) T Guardiola	6^{2}	0
(Portugal) N Marques	6	1	4
Q	(Spain) F Mantilla	4	6	6
(Haiti) R Agénor	6	6^{5}	6
7	(Spain) J Arrese	3	7^{7}	4
4	(Spain) T Carbonell	6	6
(Belgium) F Dewulf	2	4
Q	(Spain) J F Altur	7	5	6
WC	(United States) M Ridaoui	5	7	3
(Netherlands) S Schalken	6	6
(Morocco) Y El Aynaoui	2	3
(France) G Raoux	7	4	6
6	(Spain) O Martinez	5	6	1

Second round
1	(Austria) G Schaller	6	7
(Spain) E Benfele Álvarez	1	5
Q	(Spain) F Mantilla	7	3	6
(Haiti) R Agénor	5	6	1
4	(Spain) T Carbonell	6	2	6
Q	(Spain) J F Altur	4	6	4
(Netherlands) S Schalken	7^{7}	2	6
(France) G Raoux	6^{3}	6	1

Quarter-finals
1	(Austria) G Schaller	6^{2}	6	6
Q	(Spain) F Mantilla	7^{7}	4	4
4	(Spain) T Carbonell	4	3
(Netherlands) S Schalken	6	6

Semi-finals
1	(Austria) G Schaller	6	6
(Netherlands) S Schalken	4	4

=== Bottom half ===
First round
5	(Argentina) F Davín	6	6
(Spain) F Roig	3	2
(Ukraine) D Poliakov	5	6	4
(Italy) S Pescosolido	7	1	6
(Hungary) S Noszály	0	4
Q	(Spain) Á López Morón	6	6
(France) G Solvès	6	2	6
3	(Slovakia) K Kučera	3	6	1
8	(Germany) M-K Goellner	6	6
(Czech Republic) B Ulihrach	3	4
(Morocco) K Alami	6	4	2
Q	(Portugal) E Couto	2	6	6
(France) R Gilbert	6	6
WC	(Morocco) M Tahiri	3	2
WC	(Morocco) H Arazi	6	3	3
2	(Spain) Á Costa	3	6	6

Second round
5	(Argentina) F Davín	4	4
(Italy) S Pescosolido	6	6
Q	(Spain) Á López Morón	4	7^{7}	6
(France) G Solvès	6	6^{3}	1
8	(Germany) M-K Goellner	6	2	6
Q	(Portugal) E Couto	3	6	4
(France) R Gilbert	6	2	3
2	(Spain) Á Costa	3	6	6

Quarter-finals
(Italy) S Pescosolido	4	6	1
Q	(Spain) Á López Morón	6	0	6
8	(Germany) M-K Goellner	4	7^{7}	3
2	(Spain) Á Costa	6	6^{3}	6

Semi-finals
Q	(Spain) Á López Morón	3	2
2	(Spain) Á Costa	6	6
