= 1996 Grand Prix Hassan II =

- Date: 25–31 March
- Edition: 12th
- Category: World Series
- Draw: 32S / 16D
- Prize money: $203,000
- Surface: Clay / outdoor
- Location: Casablanca, Morocco
- Venue: Complexe Al Amal

Champions

Singles
- (Spain) Tomás Carbonell

Doubles
- (Czech Republic) Jiří Novák / (Czech Republic) David Rikl
- Grand Prix Hassan II

The 1996 Grand Prix Hassan II was a men's tennis tournament played on outdoor clay courts at the Complexe Al Amal in Casablanca in Morocco and was part of the World Series of the 1996 ATP Tour. It was the 12th edition of the tournament and was held from 25 March until 31 March 1996. Unseeded Tomás Carbonell won the singles title.

== Finals ==
=== Singles ===
(Spain) Tomás Carbonell defeated (Austria) Gilbert Schaller 7–5, 1–6, 6–2

- It was Carbonell's only singles title of the year and the 2nd and last of his career.

=== Doubles ===
(Czech Republic) Jiří Novák / (Czech Republic) David Rikl defeated (Spain) Tomás Carbonell / (Spain) Francisco Roig 7–6, 6–3

- It was Novák's 2nd title of the year and the 4th of his career. It was Rikl's 1st title of the year and the 10th of his career.
