= 1995 Topper Open =

- Date: 30 October – 5 November
- Edition: 2nd
- Category: World Series
- Draw: 32S / 16D
- Prize money: $203,000
- Surface: Clay / outdoor
- Location: Montevideo, Uruguay

Champions

Singles
- (Czech Republic) Bohdan Ulihrach

Doubles
- (Spain) Sergio Casal / (Spain) Emilio Sánchez
← 1994 ·	ATP Montevideo

The 1995 Topper Open was a men's tennis tournament held in Montevideo, Uruguay and played on outdoor clay courts. The tournament was part of the World Series circuit of the 1995 ATP Tour. It was the second edition of the tournament and was held from 30 October through 5 November 1995. Eighth-seeded Bohdan Ulihrach won the singles title.

== Finals ==
=== Singles ===
(Czech Republic) Bohdan Ulihrach defeated (Spain) Alberto Berasategui 6–2, 6–3

- It was Ulihrach's 2nd singles title of the year and of his career.

=== Doubles ===
(Spain) Sergio Casal / (Spain) Emilio Sánchez defeated (Czech Republic) Jiří Novák / (Czech Republic) David Rikl, 2–6, 7–6, 7–6
