= 1995 Grand Prix Hassan II =

- Date: 20–27 March
- Edition: 11th
- Category: World Series
- Draw: 32S/16D
- Prize money: $203,000
- Surface: Clay / Outdoor
- Location: Casablanca, Morocco

Champions

Singles
- (Austria) Gilbert Schaller

Doubles
- (Spain) Tomás Carbonell / (Spain) Francisco Roig
- Grand Prix Hassan II

The 1995 Grand Prix Hassan II was a men's Association of Tennis Professionals tennis tournament held in Casablanca, Morocco and played on outdoor clay courts. The event was part of the World Series of the 1995 ATP Tour. It was the 11th edition of the tournament and was held from 20 March to 27 March 1995. First-seeded Gilbert Schaller won the singles title.

== Finals ==
=== Singles ===
(Austria) Gilbert Schaller defeated (Spain) Álbert Costa 6–4, 6–2

- It was Schaller's only singles title of his career.

=== Doubles ===
(Spain) Tomás Carbonell / (Spain) Francisco Roig defeated (Portugal) Emanuel Couto / (Portugal) João Cunha-Silva 6–4, 6–1

- It was Carbonell's 1st title of the year and the 13th of his career. It was Roig's 1st title of the year and the 5th of his career.
