= 1992 Skoda Czechoslovak Open – Singles =

Singles
- 1992 Skoda Czechoslovak Open

Final
- Champion: (Czechoslovakia) Karel Nováček
- Runner-up: (Argentina) Franco Davín
- Score: 6–1, 6–1

Details
- Draw: 32 (3WC/4Q)
- Seeds: 8

Events
Singles	Doubles
← 1991 ·	Prague Open	· 1993 →

The 1992 Skoda Czechoslovak Open was a men's tennis tournament played on Clay in Prague, Czech Republic that was part of the International Series of the 1992 ATP Tour. Karel Nováček successfully defended his title, by defeating Franco Davín 6–1, 6–1 in the final.

== Seeds ==
1. (Czechoslovakia) Karel Nováček (champion)
2. (Spain) Jordi Arrese (second round)
3. (Uruguay) Marcelo Filippini (second round)
4. (Argentina) Guillermo Pérez Roldán (semifinals)
5. (Italy) Renzo Furlan (second round)
6. (Croatia) Goran Prpić (first round)
7. (Austria) Horst Skoff (second round)
8. (Sweden) Jonas Svensson (quarterfinals)

== Draw ==
=== Key ===
- Q = Qualifier
- WC = Wild card
- LL = Lucky loser
- Alt = Alternate
- SE = Special exempt
- PR = Protected ranking
- ITF = ITF entry
- JE = Junior exempt
- w/o = Walkover
- r = Retired
- d = Defaulted
- SR = Special ranking

=== Finals ===
Semifinals
1	(Czechoslovakia) Karel Nováček	6	3	6
(Czechoslovakia) David Rikl	2	6	2
4	(Argentina) Guillermo Pérez Roldán	3	2
(Argentina) Franco Davín	6	6

Final
1	(Czechoslovakia) Karel Nováček	6	6
(Argentina) Franco Davín	1	1

=== Top half ===
First round
1	(Czechoslovakia) K Nováček	6	7^{8}
WC	(Czechoslovakia) K Kučera	1	6^{6}
(Czechoslovakia) M Střelba	7^{7}	6
(Czechoslovakia) M Damm	6^{4}	1
Q	(Uruguay) D Pérez	6	3	6
(Argentina) R Azar	3	6	2
(Haiti) R Agénor	6^{3}	3
7	(Austria) H Skoff	7^{7}	6
3	(Uruguay) M Filippini	6	6
WC	(Czechoslovakia) C Suk	3	4
(France) F Fontang	6	2	2
(Czechoslovakia) D Rikl	3	6	6
(Switzerland) C Mezzadri	3	6	1
(Sweden) J Apell	6	4	6
(Australia) R Fromberg	6	7
6	(Croatia) G Prpic	1	5

Second round
1	(Czechoslovakia) K Nováček	7	6
(Czechoslovakia) M Střelba	5	1
Q	(Uruguay) D Pérez	6	2	6
7	(Austria) H Skoff	1	6	2
3	(Uruguay) M Filippini	4	4
(Czechoslovakia) D Rikl	6	6
(Sweden) J Apell	6	1	3
(Australia) R Fromberg	4	6	6

Quarterfinals
1	(Czechoslovakia) K Nováček	6	6
Q	(Uruguay) D Pérez	3	2
(Czechoslovakia) D Rikl	6	6
(Australia) R Fromberg	0	3

Semifinals
1	(Czechoslovakia) K Nováček	6	3	6
(Czechoslovakia) D Rikl	2	6	2

=== Bottom half ===
First round
5	(Italy) R Furlan	6	6
(Belgium) B Wuyts	3	1
(Georgia (country)) V Gabrichidze	6	1	7
(France) T Guardiola	1	6	5
Q	(Germany) F Krumrey	6	2	7^{7}
(Ecuador) R Viver	4	6	6^{2}
Q	(Germany) C Arriens	1	6^{4}
4	(Argentina) G Pérez Roldán	6	7^{7}
8	(Sweden) J Svensson	7^{7}	6
(Spain) M Górriz	6^{2}	4
(Italy) M Cierro	6	6^{2}	7^{7}
Q	(Czechoslovakia) V Roubíček	4	7^{7}	6^{2}
(Argentina) F Davín	6^{4}	6	7^{7}
WC	(Czechoslovakia) M Vajda	7^{7}	2	6^{3}
(Germany) M Zillner	3	7^{7}	2
2	(Spain) J Arrese	6	6^{3}	6

Second round
5	(Italy) R Furlan	3	2
(Georgia (country)) V Gabrichidze	6	6
Q	(Germany) F Krumrey	6	6^{5}	2
4	(Argentina) G Pérez Roldán	2	7^{7}	6
8	(Sweden) J Svensson	6	6
(Italy) M Cierro	4	3
(Argentina) F Davín	6	6
2	(Spain) J Arrese	2	2

Quarterfinals
(Georgia (country)) V Gabrichidze	3	0
4	(Argentina) G Pérez Roldán	6	6
8	(Sweden) J Svensson	2	6	3
(Argentina) F Davín	6	2	6

Semifinals
4	(Argentina) G Pérez Roldán	3	2
(Argentina) F Davín	6	6
