= 1995 Topper Open – Doubles =

Doubles
- 1995 Topper Open

Final
- Champions: (Spain) Sergio Casal (Spain) Emilio Sánchez
- Runners-up: (Czech Republic) Jiří Novák (Czech Republic) David Rikl
- Score: 2–6, 7–6, 7–6

Details
- Draw: 16 (3WC/1Q)
- Seeds: 4

Events
Singles	Doubles
← 1994 ·	ATP Montevideo

Marcelo Filippini and Luiz Mattar were the defending champions but Mattar did not compete this year, having retired from professional tennis during this season. Filippini teamed up with Federico Dondo and lost in the quarterfinals to Luis Lobo and Javier Sánchez.

Sergio Casal and Emilio Sánchez won the title by defeating Jiří Novák and David Rikl 2–6, 7–6, 7–6 in the final.

== Seeds ==
1. (Spain) Tomás Carbonell / (Spain) Francisco Roig (first round)
2. (Argentina) Luis Lobo / (Spain) Javier Sánchez (semifinals)
3. (Spain) Sergio Casal / (Spain) Emilio Sánchez (champions)
4. (United States) Dave Randall / (United States) Greg Van Emburgh (first round)

== Draw ==
=== Key ===
- Q = Qualifier
- WC = Wild card
- LL = Lucky loser
- Alt = Alternate
- ITF = ITF entry
- PR = Protected ranking
- SR = Special ranking
- SE = Special exempt
- JE = Junior exempt
- JR = Junior Accelerator Programme entrant
- CO = College Accelerator Programme entrant
- NG = Next Gen Accelerator Program entrant
- w/o = Walkover
- r = Retired
- d = Defaulted

=== Draw ===
First round
1	(Spain) T Carbonell (Spain) F Roig	6	5
(United States) S Cannon (United States) F Montana	7	7
(Australia) J Eagle (Australia) A Florent	6	1
(Spain) J Arrese (Spain) À Corretja	7	6
4	(United States) D Randall (United States) G Van Emburgh	6	6
(South Africa) B Haygarth (United States) D Johnson	7	7
(Czech Republic) J Novák (Czech Republic) D Rikl	6	6
WC	(Spain) A Berasategui (Spain) J Burillo	4	3
(Portugal) N Marques (United States) J Waite	6	6
Q	(United States) V Spadea (South Africa) C van Rensburg	4	4
(Argentina) P Albano (Venezuela) N Pereira	4	4
3	(Spain) S Casal (Spain) E Sánchez	6	6
WC	(Spain) C Costa (Uruguay) D Pérez	6	6	4
WC	(Uruguay) F Dondo (Uruguay) M Filippini	7	2	6
(Spain) JA Conde (Netherlands) S Noteboom	2	2
2	(Argentina) L Lobo (Spain) J Sánchez	6	6

Quarterfinals
(United States) S Cannon (United States) F Montana	6	2	1
(Spain) J Arrese (Spain) À Corretja	2	6	6
(South Africa) B Haygarth (United States) D Johnson	7	4	2
(Czech Republic) J Novák (Czech Republic) D Rikl	5	6	6
(Portugal) N Marques (United States) J Waite	6	4	2
3	(Spain) S Casal (Spain) E Sánchez	3	6	6
WC	(Uruguay) F Dondo (Uruguay) M Filippini	0	4
2	(Argentina) L Lobo (Spain) J Sánchez	6	6

Semifinals
(Spain) J Arrese (Spain) À Corretja	2	3
(Czech Republic) J Novák (Czech Republic) D Rikl	6	6
3	(Spain) S Casal (Spain) E Sánchez	6	7
2	(Argentina) L Lobo (Spain) J Sánchez	3	6

Final
(Czech Republic) J Novák (Czech Republic) D Rikl	6	6	6
3	(Spain) S Casal (Spain) E Sánchez	2	7	7
