= 1997 Grand Prix Hassan II – Doubles =

Doubles
- 1997 Grand Prix Hassan II

Final
- Champions: (Portugal) João Cunha e Silva (Portugal) Nuno Marques
- Runners-up: (Morocco) Karim Alami (Morocco) Hicham Arazi
- Score: 7–6, 6–2

Events
Singles	Doubles
← 1996 ·	Grand Prix Hassan II	· 1998 →

Jiří Novák and David Rikl were the defending champions but did not compete that year.

João Cunha e Silva and Nuno Marques won in the final 7–6, 6–2 against Karim Alami and Hicham Arazi.

== Seeds ==
1. (Spain) Tomás Carbonell / (Spain) Francisco Roig (first round)
2. (Argentina) Pablo Albano / (Netherlands) Menno Oosting (semifinals)
3. (Italy) Cristian Brandi / (Italy) Filippo Messori (first round)
4. (Portugal) João Cunha e Silva / (Portugal) Nuno Marques (champions)

== Draw ==
=== Key ===
- Q = Qualifier
- WC = Wild card
- LL = Lucky loser
- Alt = Alternate
- ITF = ITF entry
- PR = Protected ranking
- SR = Special ranking
- SE = Special exempt
- JE = Junior exempt
- JR = Junior Accelerator Programme entrant
- CO = College Accelerator Programme entrant
- NG = Next Gen Accelerator Program entrant
- w/o = Walkover
- r = Retired
- d = Defaulted

First round
1	(Spain) T Carbonell (Spain) F Roig	6	6	2
Q	(Spain) A Martín (Spain) A Portas	3	7	6
(Latvia) Ģ Dzelde (Sweden) T Nydahl	4	6
(Germany) M Huning (Romania) A Pavel	6	7
3	(Italy) C Brandi (Italy) F Messori	2	6
WC	(Morocco) K Alami (Morocco) H Arazi	6	7
(Egypt) T El-Sawy (Hungary) G Köves	5	6	1
(Germany) P Baur (Uzbekistan) O Ogorodov	7	4	6
(Portugal) B Mota (Belgium) T Vanhoudt	6	6
WC	(Morocco) M El Aarej (Morocco) M Tahiri	3	2
(Israel) N Behr (Israel) E Ran	1	6	4
4	(Portugal) J Cunha e Silva (Portugal) N Marques	6	3	6
(Canada) S Leblanc (Hungary) L Markovits	4	6
WC	(Morocco) Y El Aynaoui (Austria) U Plamberger	6	7
(Romania) D Pescariu (Czech Republic) D Škoch	3	1
2	(Argentina) P Albano (Netherlands) M Oosting	6	6

Quarterfinals
Q	(Spain) A Martín (Spain) A Portas	6	6	2
(Germany) M Huning (Romania) A Pavel	3	7	6
WC	(Morocco) K Alami (Morocco) H Arazi	6	4	6
(Germany) P Baur (Uzbekistan) O Ogorodov	1	6	3
(Portugal) B Mota (Belgium) T Vanhoudt	3	4
4	(Portugal) J Cunha e Silva (Portugal) N Marques	6	6
WC	(Morocco) Y El Aynaoui (Austria) U Plamberger	2	6
2	(Argentina) P Albano (Netherlands) M Oosting	6	7

Semifinals
(Germany) M Huning (Romania) A Pavel	6	0^{r}
WC	(Morocco) K Alami (Morocco) H Arazi	7	2
4	(Portugal) J Cunha e Silva (Portugal) N Marques	6	6
2	(Argentina) P Albano (Netherlands) M Oosting	3	4

Final
WC	(Morocco) K Alami (Morocco) H Arazi	6	2
4	(Portugal) J Cunha e Silva (Portugal) N Marques	7	6
