= 1994 Grand Prix Hassan II =

- Date: 14–21 March
- Edition: 10th
- Category: ATP World Series
- Draw: 32S / 16D
- Prize money: $188,750
- Surface: Clay / Outdoor
- Location: Casablanca, Morocco

Champions

Singles
- (Italy) Renzo Furlan

Doubles
- (South Africa) David Adams / (Netherlands) Menno Oosting
- Grand Prix Hassan II

The 1994 Grand Prix Hassan II was an ATP men's tennis tournament played on outdoor clay courts in Casablanca, Morocco that was part of ATP World Series of the 1994 ATP Tour. It was the 10th edition of the tournament and was held from 14 March until 21 March 1994. First-seeded Renzo Furlan won the singles title.

== Finals ==
=== Singles ===
(Italy) Renzo Furlan defeated (Morocco) Karim Alami 6–2, 6–2

- It was Furlan's second and last singles title of the year and of his career.

=== Doubles ===
(South Africa) David Adams / (Netherlands) Menno Oosting defeated (Italy) Cristiano Brandi / (Italy) Federico Mordegan 6–3, 6–4
