= René Hanák =

Czech tennis player (born 1973)

- Country (sports): Czechoslovakia; Czech Republic
- Born: 4 May 1973 (age 52)
- Prize money: $14,644

Singles
- Career record: 0–2
- Highest ranking: No. 349 (20 Oct 1997)

Doubles
- Highest ranking: No. 243 (8 Sep 1997)

René Hanák (born 4 May 1973) is a Czech former professional tennis player.

Hanák was a Junior Davis Cup (World Youth Cup) representative for Czechoslovakia and began competing on the professional tour in the 1990s. Reaching a best singles world ranking of 349, he made two main draw appearances on the ATP Tour during his career, at the 1990 Prague Open and the 1997 Czech Indoor.
