= 1997 Grand Prix Hassan II =

- Date: 24–30 March
- Edition: 13th
- Category: World Series
- Draw: 32S / 16D
- Prize money: $203,000
- Surface: Clay / outdoor
- Location: Casablanca, Morocco
- Venue: Complexe Al Amal

Champions

Singles
- (Morocco) Hicham Arazi

Doubles
- (Portugal) João Cunha e Silva / (Portugal) Nuno Marques
- Grand Prix Hassan II

The 1997 Grand Prix Hassan II was a men's tennis tournament played on outdoor clay courts at the Complexe Al Amal in Casablanca, Morocco and was part of the World Series of the 1997 ATP Tour. It was the 13th edition of the tournament and was held from 24 March through 30 March 1997. Second-seeded Hicham Arazi won the singles title.

== Finals ==
=== Singles ===
(Morocco) Hicham Arazi defeated (Argentina) Franco Squillari 3–6, 6–1, 6–2

- It was Arazi's only singles title of his career.

=== Doubles ===
(Portugal) João Cunha e Silva / (Portugal) Nuno Marques defeated (Morocco) Karim Alami / (Morocco) Hicham Arazi 7–6, 6–2

- It was Cunha e Silva's only title of the year and the 2nd of his career. It was Marques's only title of the year and the 1st of his career.
