= S Tennis Masters Challenger =

s Tennis Masters Challenger

Defunct tennis tournament
- Location: Graz, Austria
- Category: ATP Challenger Series
- Surface: Clay / Outdoors
- Draw: 32S/32Q/16D
- Prize money: €30,000
- Website: Official Website

The s Tennis Masters Challenger was a tennis tournament held in Graz, Austria from 1991 to 2008. The event was part of the ATP Challenger Series and was played on outdoor clay courts.

== Past finals ==
=== Singles ===
Year	Champion	Runner-up	Score
1991	(Austria) Thomas Buchmayer	(France) Thierry Guardiola	6–3, 6–2
1992	(Argentina) Guillermo Pérez Roldán	(Czech Republic) Karel Nováček	3–6, 6–2, 7–5
1993	(Spain) Alberto Berasategui	(Spain) Carlos Costa	6–4, 6–3
1994	(Spain) Francisco Clavet	(Austria) Gilbert Schaller	6–2, 2–6, 6–4
1995	(Spain) Carlos Costa	(Czech Republic) Jiří Novák	6–4, 6–3
1996	(Spain) Juan Albert Viloca	(Slovakia) Dominik Hrbatý	6–7, 6–2, 6–2
1997	(Czech Republic) Radomír Vašek	(Spain) Albert Portas	6–1, 6–3
1998	(Spain) Carlos Costa	(Spain) Albert Portas	7–5, 7–6
1999	(Czech Republic) Tomáš Zíb	(Spain) Juan Carlos Ferrero	7–6, 6–1
2000	(Czech Republic) Michal Tabara	(Spain) David Sánchez Muñoz	7–5, 6–0
2001	(Austria) Julian Knowle	(Russia) Yuri Schukin	6–3, 6–2
2002	(France) Olivier Mutis	(Italy) Filippo Volandri	6–3, 6–2
2003	(Czech Republic) Tomáš Berdych	(Austria) Julian Knowle	6–4, 5–7, 6–2
2004	(Czech Republic) Jan Minář	(France) Gilles Simon	3–6, 6–3, 7–5
2005	(Czech Republic) Robin Vik	(Croatia) Roko Karanušić	6–4, 4–2, retired
2006	(Germany) Florian Mayer	(Germany) Rainer Schüttler	6–4, 5–7, 6–2
2007	(Romania) Victor Hănescu	(Argentina) Leonardo Mayer	7–6, 6–2
2008	(France) Jérémy Chardy	(Argentina) Sergio Roitman	6–2, 6–1

=== Doubles ===
Year	Champion	Runner-up	Score
1991	(Sweden) Jan Apell (Israel) Raviv Weidenfeld	(Canada) Sébastien Leblanc (Germany) Markus Naewie	6–3, 6–3
1992	(Germany) David Prinosil (Czech Republic) Richard Vogel	(Czech Republic) Robert Novotny (Czech Republic) Milan Trněný	6–3, 6–4
1993	(Belgium) Filip Dewulf (Belgium) Tom Vanhoudt	(Spain) Jordi Arrese (Spain) Francisco Roig	6–7, 6–2, 6–3
1994	(Netherlands) Hendrik Jan Davids (Netherlands) Stephen Noteboom	(Australia) Wayne Arthurs (Australia) Simon Youl	4–6, 6–3, 7–6
1995	(Argentina) Pablo Albano (Czech Republic) Vojtěch Flégl	(Spain) Emilio Benfele Álvarez (Spain) Jose Imaz-Ruiz	6–4, 6–3
1996	(Argentina) Pablo Albano (Hungary) László Markovits	(Italy) Cristian Brandi (Italy) Filippo Messori	6–4, 6–1
1997	(Argentina) Lucas Arnold Ker (Belgium) Tom Vanhoudt	(Spain) Alberto Martín (Spain) Albert Portas	6–1, 6–2
1998	(Romania) Dinu-Mihai Pescariu (Spain) Albert Portas	(South Africa) Lan Bale (Socialist Federal Republic of Yugoslavia) Nebojša Đorđević	6–3, 6–4
1999	(Portugal) Nuno Marques (Belgium) Tom Vanhoudt	(Spain) Albert Portas (Spain) German Puentes-Alcaniz	6–2, 6–2
2000	(Czech Republic) Tomáš Cibulec (Czech Republic) Leoš Friedl	(Czech Republic) Petr Kovačka (Czech Republic) Pavel Kudrnáč	6–4, 4–6, 6–4
2001	(Australia) Tim Crichton (Australia) Todd Perry	(South Africa) Shaun Rudman (United States) Jeff Williams	6–4, 6–4
2002	(Poland) Mariusz Fyrstenberg (Poland) Marcin Matkowski	(Norway) Jan Frode Andersen (Austria) Oliver Marach	6–3, 6–4
2003	(Israel) Noam Behr (Czech Republic) Ota Fukárek	(Germany) Karsten Braasch (Sweden) Johan Landsberg	6–3, 6–2
2004	(Austria) Julian Knowle (Austria) Alexander Peya	(Spain) Emilio Benfele Álvarez (Brazil) Josh Goffi	6–4, 6–2
2005	(Austria) Julian Knowle (Austria) Alexander Peya	(Sweden) Johan Landsberg (Switzerland) Jean-Claude Scherrer	3–6, 6–1, 6–2
2006	(United Kingdom) Ross Hutchins (United Kingdom) Jonathan Marray	(United Kingdom) James Auckland (United Kingdom) Jamie Delgado	6–7, 6–4, [15–13]
2007	(Argentina) Sebastián Decoud (Russia) Yuri Schukin	(France) Jérémy Chardy (North Macedonia) Predrag Rusevski	3–6, 6–3, [10–7]
2008	(Austria) Gerald Melzer (Austria) Jürgen Melzer	(France) Julien Jeanpierre (France) Nicolas Renavand	1–6, 7–6, [10–4]
