= 1994 Topper Open – Doubles =

Doubles
- 1994 Topper Open

Final
- Champions: (Uruguay) Marcelo Filippini (Brazil) Luiz Mattar
- Runners-up: (Spain) Sergio Casal (Spain) Emilio Sánchez
- Score: 7–6, 6–4

Details
- Draw: 16
- Seeds: 4

Events
Singles	Doubles
ATP Montevideo	· 1995 →

In the first edition of the tournament, Marcelo Filippini and Luiz Mattar won the title by defeating Sergio Casal and Emilio Sánchez 7–6, 6–4 in the final.

== Seeds ==
1. (Spain) Sergio Casal / (Spain) Emilio Sánchez (final)
2. (Italy) Cristian Brandi / (Italy) Federico Mordegan (first round)
3. (Czech Republic) Karel Nováček / (Uruguay) Diego Pérez (first round)
4. (Spain) Tomás Carbonell / (Spain) Francisco Roig (quarterfinals)

== Draw ==
=== Key ===
- Q = Qualifier
- WC = Wild card
- LL = Lucky loser
- Alt = Alternate
- ITF = ITF entry
- PR = Protected ranking
- SR = Special ranking
- SE = Special exempt
- JE = Junior exempt
- JR = Junior Accelerator Programme entrant
- CO = College Accelerator Programme entrant
- NG = Next Gen Accelerator Program entrant
- w/o = Walkover
- r = Retired
- d = Defaulted

=== Draw ===
First round
1	(Spain) S Casal (Spain) E Sánchez	6	6	6
(Argentina) P Arnold (Argentina) D Orsanic	7	0	2
(Spain) J Arrese (Spain) JA Conde	4	7	7
(United States) D Johnson (United States) G Van Emburgh	6	6	5
3	(Czech Republic) K Nováček (Uruguay) D Pérez	3	1
(Argentina) J Garat (Argentina) L Lobo	6	6
(Argentina) J Frana (Mexico) L Lavalle	6	6
(Brazil) O Della (Brazil) M Saliola	4	2
(Uruguay) M Filippini (Brazil) L Mattar	6	6
(Argentina) C Miniussi (Sweden) M Wilander	3	2
(Mexico) J Lozano (Venezuela) M Ruah	6	3	5
4	(Spain) T Carbonell (Spain) F Roig	3	6	7
(Argentina) P Albano (Venezuela) N Pereira	7	6
(Netherlands) T Kempers (United States) J Waite	5	4
(Portugal) E Couto (Portugal) J Cunha e Silva	6	6
2	(Italy) C Brandi (Italy) F Mordegan	3	1

Quarterfinals
1	(Spain) S Casal (Spain) E Sánchez	6	7
(Spain) J Arrese (Spain) JA Conde	3	6
(Argentina) J Garat (Argentina) L Lobo	6	6
(Argentina) J Frana (Mexico) L Lavalle	3	2
(Uruguay) M Filippini (Brazil) L Mattar	5	6	7
4	(Spain) T Carbonell (Spain) F Roig	7	2	6
(Argentina) P Albano (Venezuela) N Pereira	6	7
(Portugal) E Couto (Portugal) J Cunha e Silva	4	6

Semifinals
1	(Spain) S Casal (Spain) E Sánchez	4	6	7
(Argentina) J Garat (Argentina) L Lobo	6	3	6
(Uruguay) M Filippini (Brazil) L Mattar	6	0	6
(Argentina) P Albano (Venezuela) N Pereira	3	6	3

Final
1	(Spain) S Casal (Spain) E Sánchez	6	4
(Uruguay) M Filippini (Brazil) L Mattar	7	6
