= 1992 Skoda Czechoslovak Open =

Tennis tournament

- Date: 10–16 August
- Edition: 6th
- Category: World Series
- Draw: 32S / 16D
- Prize money: $365,000
- Surface: Clay / outdoor
- Location: Prague, Czechoslovakia
- Venue: I. Czech Lawn Tennis Club

Champions

Singles
- (Czechoslovakia) Karel Nováček

Doubles
- (Czechoslovakia) Karel Nováček / (Czechoslovakia) Vojtěch Flégl
- Prague Open

The 1992 Skoda Czechoslovak Open, also known as the Prague Open was a men's tennis tournament played on outdoor clay courts at the I. Czech Lawn Tennis Club in Prague, Czechoslovakia that was part of the ATP World Series (Designated Week) of the 1992 ATP Tour. It was the sixth edition of the tournament and was held from 10 August until 16 August 1992. First-seeded Karel Nováček won his second consecutive singles title at the event.

== Finals ==
=== Singles ===
(Czechoslovakia) Karel Nováček defeated (Argentina) Franco Davín 6–1, 6–1

- It was Nováček's 3rd singles title of the year and the 10th of his career.

=== Doubles ===
(Czechoslovakia) Karel Nováček / (Czechoslovakia) Branislav Stankovic defeated (Sweden) Jonas Björkman / (Australia) Jon Ireland 7–5, 6–1
