= 1993 Skoda Czech Open – Singles =

Singles
- 1993 Skoda Czech Open

Final
- Champion: (Spain) Sergi Bruguera
- Runner-up: (Russia) Andrei Chesnokov
- Score: 7–5, 6–4

Details
- Draw: 32 (3WC/4Q)
- Seeds: 8

Events
Singles	Doubles
← 1992 ·	Prague Open	· 1994 →

The 1993 Skoda Czech Open was a men's tennis tournament played on Clay in Prague, Czech Republic as part of the International Series of the 1993 ATP Tour. Karel Nováček was the defending champion, but he did not compete.

Sergi Bruguera won the title by defeating Andrei Chesnokov 7–5, 6–4 in the final.

== Seeds ==
1. (Spain) Sergi Bruguera (champion)
2. (Sweden) Magnus Gustafsson (semifinals, retired)
3. (Russia) Andrei Chesnokov (final)
4. (France) Fabrice Santoro (first round)
5. (Australia) Richard Fromberg (first round)
6. (Spain) Carlos Costa (quarterfinals)
7. (Sweden) Nicklas Kulti (quarterfinals)
8. (Sweden) Magnus Larsson (first round)

== Draw ==
=== Key ===
- Q = Qualifier
- WC = Wild card
- LL = Lucky loser
- Alt = Alternate
- SE = Special exempt
- PR = Protected ranking
- ITF = ITF entry
- JE = Junior exempt
- w/o = Walkover
- r = Retired
- d = Defaulted
- SR = Special ranking

=== Finals ===
Semifinals
1	(Spain) Sergi Bruguera	6	6
(Russia) Andrei Cherkasov	3	1
3	(Russia) Andrei Chesnokov	7	2
2	(Sweden) Magnus Gustafsson	5	0^{r}

Final
1	(Spain) Sergi Bruguera	7	6
3	(Russia) Andrei Chesnokov	5	4

=== Top half ===
First round
1	(Spain) S Bruguera	6	6
WC	(Czech Republic) T Zdražila	1	3
WC	(Czech Republic) J Novák	2	7^{8}	7^{7}
(Argentina) C Miniussi	6	6^{6}	6^{5}
(Spain) J Arrese	6	7^{7}
(Spain) À Corretja	2	6^{1}
(Brazil) J Oncins	6	6
8	(Sweden) M Larsson	2	3
4	(France) F Santoro	5	5
WC	(Czech Republic) D Škoch	7	7
(Russia) A Cherkasov	6	7
Q	(Czech Republic) B Ulihrach	1	5
Q	(Australia) S Youl	2	4
(Czech Republic) S Doseděl	6	6
(Czech Republic) D Rikl	2	1
6	(Spain) C Costa	6	6

Second round
1	(Spain) S Bruguera	6	6
WC	(Czech Republic) J Novák	1	2
(Spain) J Arrese	7	6
(Brazil) J Oncins	5	3
WC	(Czech Republic) D Škoch	2	0
(Russia) A Cherkasov	6	6
(Czech Republic) S Doseděl	6^{5}	4
6	(Spain) C Costa	7^{7}	6

Quarterfinals
1	(Spain) S Bruguera	6	6
(Spain) J Arrese	2	1
(Russia) A Cherkasov	6	7
6	(Spain) C Costa	3	5

Semifinals
1	(Spain) S Bruguera	6	6
(Russia) A Cherkasov	3	1

=== Bottom half ===
First round
5	(Australia) R Fromberg	3	1
(Sweden) T Nydahl	6	6
(Netherlands) P Haarhuis	6	7
(Czech Republic) M Damm	1	5
Q	(France) G Solvès	5	7	6
(Germany) D Prinosil	7	5	0
(Spain) JF Altur	3	4
3	(Russia) A Chesnokov	6	6
7	(Sweden) N Kulti	6	4	6
(Spain) A Berasategui	4	6	4
Q	(Chile) F Rivera	6	6
(Argentina) R Azar	2	4
(Italy) M Valeri	4	7	6
(Sweden) A Järryd	6	5	4
(Argentina) F Davín	4	2
2	(Sweden) M Gustafsson	6	6

Second round
(Sweden) T Nydahl	3	6	2
(Netherlands) P Haarhuis	6	0	6
Q	(France) G Solvès	6	4	2
3	(Russia) A Chesnokov	3	6	6
7	(Sweden) N Kulti	6	6
Q	(Chile) F Rivera	2	1
(Italy) M Valeri	3	1
2	(Sweden) M Gustafsson	6	6

Quarterfinals
(Netherlands) P Haarhuis	2	2
3	(Russia) A Chesnokov	6	6
7	(Sweden) N Kulti	6	3	0
2	(Sweden) M Gustafsson	4	6	6

Semifinals
3	(Russia) A Chesnokov	7	2
2	(Sweden) M Gustafsson	5	0^{r}
