= 1994 Torneo Internazionale Città di Firenze – Singles =

Singles
- 1994 Torneo Internazionale Città di Firenze

Final
- Champion: (Uruguay) Marcelo Filippini
- Runner-up: (Australia) Richard Fromberg
- Score: 3–6, 6–3, 6–3

Details
- Draw: 32 (3WC/4Q/1LL)
- Seeds: 8

Events
Singles	Doubles
- ATP Florence

Thomas Muster was the three-time defending champion, but did not compete this year.

Marcelo Filippini won the title by defeating Richard Fromberg 3–6, 6–3, 6–3 in the final.

== Seeds ==
1. (Spain) Alberto Berasategui (second round, retired)
2. (Spain) Javier Sánchez (second round)
3. (Haiti) Ronald Agénor (second round)
4. (Italy) Renzo Furlan (first round)
5. (Italy) Stefano Pescosolido (first round)
6. (Spain) Jordi Arrese (first round)
7. (Germany) Marc-Kevin Goellner (quarterfinals)
8. (Morocco) Younes El Aynaoui (second round)

== Draw ==
Key

- Q = Qualifier
- WC = Wild card
- LL = Lucky loser
- Alt = Alternate
- ITF = ITF entry
- PR = Protected ranking
- SR = Special ranking
- SE = Special exempt
- JE = Junior exempt
- JR = Junior Accelerator Programme entrant
- CO = College Accelerator Programme entrant
- NG = Next Gen Accelerator Program entrant
- w/o = Walkover
- r = Retired
- d = Defaulted

=== Finals ===
Semifinals
WC	(Italy) Paolo Canè	1	2
(Uruguay) Marcelo Filippini	6	6
(Germany) Bernd Karbacher	4	6^{5}
(Australia) Richard Fromberg	6	7^{7}

Final
(Uruguay) Marcelo Filippini	3	6	6
(Australia) Richard Fromberg	6	3	3

=== Top half ===
First round
1	(Spain) A Berasategui	6	6
LL	(Argentina) J Garat	4	4
(Germany) CU Steeb	4	6^{6}
WC	(Italy) P Canè	6	7^{8}
(Sweden) L Jönsson	6	1	4
(Spain) A Costa	4	6	6
(Argentina) F Davín	5	3
7	(Germany) MK Goellner	7	6
4	(Italy) R Furlan	4	1
(Argentina) H de la Peña	6	6
(United States) J Tarango	6	6
(France) R Gilbert	2	2
Q	(Italy) D Sanguinetti	5	3
WC	(Italy) G Galimberti	7	6
(Uruguay) M Filippini	6	6
6	(Spain) J Arrese	1	1

Second round
1	(Spain) A Berasategui	3	r
WC	(Italy) P Canè	6
(Spain) A Costa	4	4
7	(Germany) MK Goellner	6	6
(Argentina) H de la Peña	3	6	6
(United States) J Tarango	6	3	2
WC	(Italy) G Galimberti	1	2
(Uruguay) M Filippini	6	6

Quarterfinals
WC	(Italy) P Canè	7^{7}	6
7	(Germany) MK Goellner	6^{1}	1
(Argentina) H de la Peña	2	2
(Uruguay) M Filippini	6	6

Semifinals
WC	(Italy) P Canè	1	2
(Uruguay) M Filippini	6	6

=== Bottom half ===
First round
5	(Italy) S Pescosolido	7^{7}	6^{5}	0
(Spain) T Carbonell	6^{3}	7^{7}	6
(Germany) B Karbacher	6	7^{7}
Q	(United States) M Lucena	3	6^{4}
WC	(Italy) O Camporese	2	6	5
(Argentina) G Markus	6	4	7
Q	(Italy) D Musa	6	6^{3}	4
3	(Haiti) R Agénor	3	7^{7}	6
8	(Morocco) Y El Aynaoui	6	6
Q	(Spain) F Sánchez	3	3
(France) G Solvès	6^{2}	5
(Spain) F Clavet	7^{7}	7
(Australia) R Fromberg	6	6
(Spain) J Burillo	4	1
(Sweden) N Kulti	3	2
2	(Spain) J Sánchez	6	6

Second round
(Spain) T Carbonell	1	6	4
(Germany) B Karbacher	6	2	6
(Argentina) G Markus	2	6	6
3	(Haiti) R Agénor	6	2	3
8	(Morocco) Y El Aynaoui	3	6	4
(Spain) F Clavet	6	3	6
(Australia) R Fromberg	7^{7}	6
2	(Spain) J Sánchez	6^{2}	4

Quarterfinals
(Germany) B Karbacher	7^{11}	7^{11}
(Argentina) G Markus	6^{9}	6^{9}
(Spain) F Clavet	6	3	4
(Australia) R Fromberg	2	6	6

Semifinals
(Germany) B Karbacher	4	6^{5}
(Australia) R Fromberg	6	7^{7}
