= 1993 Skoda Czech Open =

- Date: 2–8 August
- Edition: 7th
- Category: World Series
- Draw: 32S / 16D
- Prize money: $340,000
- Surface: Clay / outdoor
- Location: Prague, Czech Republic
- Venue: I. Czech Lawn Tennis Club

Champions

Singles
- (Spain) Sergi Bruguera

Doubles
- (Netherlands) Hendrik Jan Davids / (Belgium) Libor Pimek
- Prague Open

The 1993 Skoda Czech Open, also known as the Prague Open, was a men's tennis tournament played on outdoor clay courts at the I. Czech Lawn Tennis Club in Prague, Czech Republic that was part of the ATP World Series of the 1993 ATP Tour. It was the seventh edition of the tournament and was held from 2 August until 8 August 1993. First-seeded Sergi Bruguera won the singles title.

== Finals ==
=== Singles ===
(Spain) Sergi Bruguera defeated (Russia) Andrei Chesnokov 7–5, 6–4

- It was Bruguera's 4th singles title of the year and the 10th of his career.

=== Doubles ===
(Netherlands) Hendrik Jan Davids / (Belgium) Libor Pimek defeated (Mexico) Jorge Lozano / (Brazil) Jaime Oncins 6–3, 7–6
