= 1992 Trofeo Kim Top Line – Doubles =

Doubles
- 1992 Trofeo Kim Top Line

Final
- Champions: (Uruguay) Marcelo Filippini (Brazil) Luiz Mattar
- Runners-up: (South Africa) Royce Deppe (South Africa) Brent Haygarth
- Score: 6–4, 6–7, 6–4

Details
- Draw: 16 (2WC/1Q)
- Seeds: 4

Events
Singles	Doubles
- ATP Florence

Ola Jonsson and Magnus Larsson were the defending champions, but none competed this year.

Marcelo Filippini and Luiz Mattar won the title by defeating Royce Deppe and Brent Haygarth 6–4, 6–7, 6–4 in the final.

== Seeds ==
1. (Netherlands) Paul Haarhuis / (Netherlands) Mark Koevermans (quarterfinals)
2. (United States) Shelby Cannon / (United States) Greg Van Emburgh (semifinals)
3. (Netherlands) Menno Oosting / (Croatia) Goran Prpić (semifinals)
4. (Brazil) Ricardo Acioly / (Brazil) Mauro Menezes (first round)

== Draw ==
Key

- Q = Qualifier
- WC = Wild card
- LL = Lucky loser
- Alt = Alternate
- ITF = ITF entry
- PR = Protected ranking
- SR = Special ranking
- SE = Special exempt
- JE = Junior exempt
- JR = Junior Accelerator Programme entrant
- CO = College Accelerator Programme entrant
- NG = Next Gen Accelerator Program entrant
- w/o = Walkover
- r = Retired
- d = Defaulted

=== Draw ===
First round
1	(Netherlands) P Haarhuis (Netherlands) M Koevermans	6	5	6
WC	(Italy) A Gaudenzi (Austria) T Muster	4	7	3
(Uruguay) M Filippini (Brazil) L Mattar	6	6
(United States) M Lucena (Norway) BO Pedersen	4	3
3	(Netherlands) M Oosting (Croatia) G Prpić	6	6
(Spain) JC Báguena (Germany) L Koslowski	2	4
(Argentina) H de la Peña (United States) D Eisenman	4	4
Q	(Spain) JF Altur (Belgium) E Masso	6	6
(South Africa) R Deppe (South Africa) B Haygarth	7	6
(United States) TJ Middleton (United States) T Scherman	6	4
(Spain) J Arrese (Spain) M Górriz	2	6	6
4	(Brazil) R Acioly (Brazil) M Menezes	6	2	1
(Latvia) Ģ Dzelde (Nigeria) N Odizor	0	6	6
WC	(Italy) R Furlan (Argentina) G Pérez Roldán	6	2	1
(South Africa) JL de Jager (Finland) O Rahnasto	5	2
2	(United States) S Cannon (United States) G Van Emburgh	7	6

Quarterfinals
1	(Netherlands) P Haarhuis (Netherlands) M Koevermans	6	2	1
(Uruguay) M Filippini (Brazil) L Mattar	2	6	6
3	(Netherlands) M Oosting (Croatia) G Prpić	6	6
Q	(Spain) JF Altur (Belgium) E Masso	3	4
(South Africa) R Deppe (South Africa) B Haygarth	6	6
(Spain) J Arrese (Spain) M Górriz	0	1
(Latvia) Ģ Dzelde (Nigeria) N Odizor	6	2
2	(United States) S Cannon (United States) G Van Emburgh	7	6

Semifinals
(Uruguay) M Filippini (Brazil) L Mattar	6	6
3	(Netherlands) M Oosting (Croatia) G Prpić	1	2
(South Africa) R Deppe (South Africa) B Haygarth	7	7
2	(United States) S Cannon (United States) G Van Emburgh	5	5

Final
(Uruguay) M Filippini (Brazil) L Mattar	6	6	6
(South Africa) R Deppe (South Africa) B Haygarth	4	7	4
