= 1990 Czechoslovak Open =

Tennis tournament

- Date: 6–12 August
- Edition: 4th
- Category: World Series
- Draw: 32S / 16D
- Prize money: $148,400
- Surface: Clay / outdoor
- Location: Prague, Czechoslovakia
- Venue: I. Czech Lawn Tennis Club

Champions

Singles
- (Spain) Jordi Arrese

Doubles
- (Czechoslovakia) Vojtěch Flégl / (Czechoslovakia) Daniel Vacek
- Prague Open

The 1990 Czechoslovak Open, also known as the Prague Open, was a men's tennis tournament played on outdoor clay courts at the I. Czech Lawn Tennis Club in Prague, Czechoslovakia that was part of the ATP World Series (Designated Week) of the 1990 ATP Tour. It was the fourth edition of the tournament and was held from 6 August until 12 August 1990. Eighth-seeded Jordi Arrese won the singles title.

== Finals ==
=== Singles ===
(Spain) Jordi Arrese defeated (Sweden) Nicklas Kulti 7–6, 7–6

- It was Arrese's 2nd singles title of the year and of his career.

=== Doubles ===
(Czechoslovakia) Vojtěch Flégl / (Czechoslovakia) Daniel Vacek defeated (Romania) George Cosac / (Romania) Florin Segărceanu 5–7, 6–4, 6–3
