= Milan Trněný =

Czech tennis player (born 1971)

- Country (sports): Czechoslovakia; Czech Republic
- Born: 6 March 1971 (age 55)
- Prize money: $12,035

Singles
- Career record: 0–1
- Highest ranking: No. 471 (11 Sep 1995)

Doubles
- Career record: 0–1
- Highest ranking: No. 264 (21 Jun 1993)

Milan Trněný (born 6 March 1971) is a Czech former professional tennis player.

Trneny, who had a best singles ranking of 471, featured in the 1991 Prague Open main draw, losing his first round match in three sets to Dimitri Poliakov. His best doubles ranking was 264 and he made one ATP Challenger doubles final.

== ATP Challenger finals ==
=== Doubles: 1 (0–1) ===
Result	No.	Date	Tournament	Surface	Partner	Opponents	Score
Loss	1.	Aug 1992	Graz, Austria	Clay	(Czechoslovakia) Robert Novotny	(Germany) David Prinosil (Czechoslovakia) Richard Vogel	3–6, 4–6
