= 1991 Czechoslovak Open =

- Date: 5–11 August
- Edition: 5th
- Category: World Series
- Draw: 32S / 16D
- Prize money: $305,000
- Surface: Clay / outdoor
- Location: Prague, Czechoslovakia
- Venue: I. Czech Lawn Tennis Club

Champions

Singles
- (Czechoslovakia) Karel Nováček

Doubles
- (Czechoslovakia) Vojtěch Flégl / (Czechoslovakia) Cyril Suk
- Prague Open

The 1991 Czechoslovak Open, also known as the Prague Open, was a men's tennis tournament played on outdoor clay courts at the I. Czech Lawn Tennis Club in Prague, Czechoslovakia that was part of the ATP World Series (Designated Week) of the 1991 ATP Tour. It was the fifth edition of the tournament and was held from 5 August until 11 August 1991. Second-seeded Karel Nováček won the singles title.

== Finals ==
=== Singles ===
(Czechoslovakia) Karel Nováček defeated (Sweden) Magnus Gustafsson 7–6^{(7–5)}, 6–2

- It was Nováček's 4th singles title of the year and the 7th of his career.

=== Doubles ===
(Czechoslovakia) Vojtěch Flégl / (Czechoslovakia) Cyril Suk defeated (Czechoslovakia) Libor Pimek / (Czechoslovakia) Daniel Vacek 6–4, 6–2
