= Martin Zumpft =

German tennis player

- Country (sports): Germany
- Born: 11 October 1971 (age 53); Wertheim, West Germany
- Height: 180 cm (5 ft 11 in)
- Prize money: $40,974

Singles
- Highest ranking: No. 268 (29 April 1996)

Doubles
- Career record: 3–3
- Highest ranking: No. 147 (25 September 1995)

Martin Zumpft (born 11 October 1971) is a German former professional tennis player.

Zumpft competed on the ATP Tour during the 1990s, making doubles semi-finals at Casablanca in 1994 and at San Marino in 1995. He reached a career high singles ranking of 268 and best doubles ranking of 147 in the world.

Now based in the United States, Zumpft previously coached at the Nick Bollettieri/IMG Academy, where he was involved in training a young Maria Sharapova. After leaving the academy he was a coach of Mary Pierce.

== Challenger titles ==
=== Doubles: (2) ===
No.	Date	Tournament	Surface	Partner	Opponents	Score
1.	June 1994	Bombay, India	Hard	(Germany) Martin Sinner	(Germany) Sascha Nensel (Germany) Torben Theine	6–1, 6–4
2.	September 1995	Singapore	Hard	(United Kingdom) Chris Wilkinson	(Italy) Nicola Bruno (Italy) Mosé Navarra	4–6, 6–1, 6–4
