= ATP Montevideo =

Defunct tennis tournament
- Tour: ATP Tour (1994-1995); Challenger (1998–2001)
- Founded: 1994
- Abolished: 2001
- Editions: 6
- Location: Montevideo, Uruguay
- Surface: Clay / outdoor

The ATP Montevideo was a men's tennis tournament played in Montevideo, Uruguay. The event was part of the ATP Tour in 1994 and 1995. The tournament returned in 1998 as a Challenger event. It was played in late October/early November on outdoor clay courts.

== ATP results ==
=== Singles ===
Year	Champions	Runners-up	Score
1994	(Spain) Alberto Berasategui	(Spain) Francisco Clavet	6–4, 6–0
1995	(Czech Republic) Bohdan Ulihrach	(Spain) Alberto Berasategui	6–2, 6–3

=== Doubles ===
Year	Champions	Runners-up	Score
1994	(Uruguay) Marcelo Filippini (Brazil) Luiz Mattar	(Spain) Sergio Casal (Spain) Emilio Sánchez	7–6, 6–4
1995	(Spain) Sergio Casal (Spain) Emilio Sánchez	(Czech Republic) Jiří Novák (Czech Republic) David Rikl	2–6, 7–6, 7–6

== Challenger results ==
=== Singles ===
Year	Champion	Runner-up	Score
1998	(Argentina) Eduardo Medica	(Norway) Christian Ruud	6–4, 6–4
1999	(Morocco) Karim Alami	(Spain) Galo Blanco	6–3, 6–1
2000	(Argentina) Guillermo Coria	(Argentina) José Acasuso	6–3, 6–7(9), 6–2
2001	(Argentina) David Nalbandian	(Chile) Fernando González	6–2, 3–6, 6–3

=== Doubles ===
Year	Champion	Runner-up	Score
1998	(Argentina) Francisco Cabello (Argentina) Agustín Calleri	(Brazil) Paulo Taicher (Brazil) Cristiano Testa	6–4, 6–4
1999	(Argentina) Pablo Albano (Argentina) Martín García	(Argentina) Diego del Río (Argentina) Daniel Orsanic	6–2, 6–3
2000	(Argentina) Lucas Arnold Ker (Argentina) Gastón Etlis	(Spain) Joan Balcells (Spain) Germán Puentes	6–4, 6–4
2001	(Argentina) Diego del Río (Argentina) Martín Vassallo Argüello	(Argentina) Gastón Etlis (Argentina) Mariano Hood	W/O
