= Jon Ireland =

Australian tennis player

- Full name: Jon Ireland (The Royal Sydney Starter)
- Country (sports): Australia
- Born: September 26, 1967 (age 57); Sydney, Australia
- Height: 6 ft 1 in (185 cm)
- Plays: Left-handed
- Prize money: $166,355

Singles
- Career record: 0–0
- Career titles: 0; 0 Challenger, 0 Futures
- Highest ranking: No. 591 (3 October 1988)

Grand Slam singles results
- Australian Open: Q2 (1991, 1992)

Doubles
- Career record: 37–69
- Career titles: 1; 0 Challenger, 0 Futures
- Highest ranking: No. 90 (22 May 1995)

Grand Slam doubles results
- Australian Open: 2R (1995, 1997)
- French Open: 2R (1995)
- Wimbledon: 2R (1995)
- US Open: 1R (1995)

Grand Slam mixed doubles results
- Wimbledon: 1R (1995, 1996)
- Last updated on: 15 May 2023.

Jon Ireland (born 26 September 1967) is a former professional tennis player from Australia.

Ireland enjoyed most of his tennis success while playing doubles. During his career he won 1 doubles title. He achieved a career-high doubles ranking of World No. 90 in 1995.

== ATP career finals ==
=== Doubles: 3 (1 title, 2 runner-ups) ===
Legend Grand Slam Tournaments (0–0) ATP World Tour Finals (0–0) ATP Masters Series (0–0) ATP Championship Series (0–0) ATP World Series (1–2)	Finals by surface Hard (0–0) Clay (1–2) Grass (0–0) Carpet (0–0)	Finals by setting Outdoors (1–2) Indoors (0–0)

Result	W–L	Date	Tournament	Tier	Surface	Partner	Opponents	Score
Loss	0–1	Aug 1992	Prague, Czech Republic	World Series	Clay	(Sweden) Jonas Björkman	(Czech Republic) Karel Nováček (Slovakia) Branislav Stankovič	5–7, 1–6
Win	1–1	Jun 1994	Florence, Italy	World Series	Clay	(United States) Kenny Thorne	(United Kingdom) Neil Broad (United States) Greg Van Emburgh	7–6, 6–3
Loss	1–2	Jul 1995	Båstad, Sweden	World Series	Clay	(Australia) Andrew Kratzmann	(Sweden) Jan Apell (Sweden) Jonas Björkman	3–6, 0–6

== ATP Challenger and ITF Futures finals ==
=== Doubles: 4 (0–4) ===
Legend ATP Challenger (0–4) ITF Futures (0–0)	Finals by surface Hard (0–0) Clay (0–3) Grass (0–0) Carpet (0–1)

Result	W–L	Date	Tournament	Tier	Surface	Partner	Opponents	Score
Loss	0–1	Apr 1993	Parioli, Italy	Challenger	Clay	(United Kingdom) Sean Cole	(Italy) Cristian Brandi (Italy) Federico Mordegan	3–6, 5–7
Loss	0–2	May 1993	Bochum, Germany	Challenger	Clay	(Australia) Andrew Kratzmann	(Sweden) Mårten Renström (Netherlands) Joost Winnink	3–6, 6–2, 5–7
Loss	0–3	Oct 1993	Munich, Germany	Challenger	Carpet	(United States) John Yancey	(Netherlands) Sander Groen (Germany) Arne Thoms	3–6, 3–6
Loss	0–4	May 1995	Dresden, Germany	Challenger	Clay	(United States) Mike Bauer	(United States) Matt Lucena (Portugal) Nuno Marques	1–6, 4–6
