= Gilbert Schaller =

Austrian tennis player

- Country (sports): Austria
- Residence: Graz, Austria
- Born: 17 March 1969 (age 57) Bruck an der Mur, Styria, Austria
- Height: 1.80 m (5 ft 11 in)
- Turned pro: 1987
- Retired: 1999
- Plays: Right-handed (two-handed backhand)
- Prize money: $1,317,163

Singles
- Career record: 115–132
- Career titles: 1
- Highest ranking: No. 17 (16 October 1995)

Grand Slam singles results
- Australian Open: 3R (1997)
- French Open: 2R (1992, 1995, 1996)
- Wimbledon: 1R (1993)
- US Open: 1R (1994, 1995, 1996, 1997)

Doubles
- Career record: 3–13
- Career titles: 0
- Highest ranking: No. 245 (21 March 1994)
- Last updated on: 3 April 2022.

Gilbert Schaller (born 17 March 1969), is a former professional tennis player from Austria.

Schaller achieved a career-high singles ranking of World No. 17 in 1995. At the 1995 French Open, Schaller upset world No. 2 Pete Sampras in the first round in a five set match.

Schaller won one singles title (in Casablanca) and reached the quarterfinals of the 1996 Hamburg Masters and the 1995 Monte Carlo Masters. He participated in seven Davis Cup ties for Austria from 1993 to 1997, posting a 3–6 record in singles. Schaller resided in Graz when a tour player. From 2007 to 2011, he was Captain of the Austrian Davis Cup-Team and sports director of the ÖTV. Schaller currently works as the sports director in the McCartney Group in Vienna, and as an ATP coach with (Florin Mergea and Marin Draganja).

== ATP career finals ==
=== Singles: 4 (1 title, 3 runner-ups) ===
Legend Grand Slam Tournaments (0–0) ATP World Tour Finals (0–0) ATP Masters Series (0–0) ATP Championship Series (0–0) ATP World Series (1–3)	Finals by surface Hard (0–0) Clay (1–3) Grass (0–0) Carpet (0–0)	Finals by setting Outdoors (1–3) Indoors (0–0)

Result	W–L	Date	Tournament	Tier	Surface	Opponent	Score
Win	1–0	Mar 1995	Casablanca, Morocco	World Series	Clay	(Spain) Albert Costa	6–4, 6–2
Loss	1–1	Sep 1995	Bucharest, Romania	World Series	Clay	(Austria) Thomas Muster	3–6, 4–6
Loss	1–2	Oct 1995	Valencia, Spain	World Series	Clay	(Netherlands) Sjeng Schalken	4–6, 2–6
Loss	1–3	Mar 1996	Casablanca, Morocco	World Series	Clay	(Spain) Tomás Carbonell	5–7, 6–1, 2–6

== ATP Challenger and ITF Futures finals ==
=== Singles: 14 (8–6) ===
Legend ATP Challenger (8–5) ITF Futures (0–1)	Finals by surface Hard (0–1) Clay (8–5) Grass (0–0) Carpet (0–0)

Result	W–L	Date	Tournament	Tier	Surface	Opponent	Score
Loss	0-1	Jun 1992	Salzburg, Austria	Challenger	Clay	(Spain) Jordi Arrese	6–7, 6–7
Win	1-1	Jul 1992	Belo Horizonte, Brazil	Challenger	Clay	(Portugal) João Cunha-Silva	6–4, 6–7, 6–0
Win	2-1	Aug 1992	Lins, Brazil	Challenger	Clay	(Colombia) Mauricio Hadad	6–3, 6–3
Win	3-1	Sep 1992	Casablanca, Morocco	Challenger	Clay	(Spain) Federico Sanchez	6–4, 6–1
Win	4-1	Aug 1993	Liège, Belgium	Challenger	Clay	(Norway) Christian Ruud	1–6, 7–6, 6–1
Loss	4-2	Sep 1993	Venice, Italy	Challenger	Clay	(Spain) Tomás Carbonell	4–6, 6–0, 1–6
Win	5-2	Sep 1993	Prague, Czech Republic	Challenger	Clay	(Italy) Massimo Valeri	6–4, 7–6
Win	6-2	Oct 1993	Curitiba, Brazil	Challenger	Clay	(Argentina) Christian Miniussi	6–4, 6–0
Loss	6-3	Dec 1993	Naples, United States	Challenger	Clay	(Germany) Karsten Braasch	6–1, 4–6, 6–7
Win	7-3	Jun 1994	Braunschweig, Germany	Challenger	Clay	(Spain) Javier Sánchez	6–4, 3–6, 6–3
Win	8-3	Jul 1994	Oporta, Portugal	Challenger	Clay	(Greece) Marcelo Filippini	6–2, 7–5
Loss	8-4	Aug 1994	Graz, Austria	Challenger	Clay	(Spain) Francisco Clavet	3–6, 6–2, 4–6
Loss	8-5	Mar 1997	Salinas, Ecuador	Challenger	Hard	(Germany) Oliver Gross	1–6, 6–3, 2–6
Loss	8-6	Jun 1999	Hungary F2, Budapest	Futures	Clay	(France) Olivier Malcor	3–6, 0–6

=== Doubles: 3 (1–2) ===
Legend ATP Challenger (0–2) ITF Futures (1–0)	Finals by surface Hard (0–0) Clay (1–2) Grass (0–0) Carpet (0–0)

Result	W–L	Date	Tournament	Tier	Surface	Partner	Opponents	Score
Loss	0–1	Sep 1993	Venice, Italy	Challenger	Clay	(Mexico) Oliver Fernandez	(Argentina) Horacio de la Peña (Spain) Juan Gisbert-Schultze	1–6, 3–6
Loss	0–2	Oct 1993	Curitiba, Brazil	Challenger	Clay	(United States) Francisco Montana	(Portugal) João Cunha-Silva (United States) Jack Waite	6–4, 3–6, 0–6
Win	1–2	Aug 2000	Italy F9, San Benedetto del Tronto	Futures	Clay	(Austria) Oliver Marach	(Italy) Giancarlo Petrazzuolo (Italy) Potito Starace	5–3, 5–3, 4–0

== Performance timeline ==
Key
W	F	SF	QF	#R	RR	Q#	DNQ	A	NH

(W) winner; (F) finalist; (SF) semifinalist; (QF) quarterfinalist; (#R) rounds 4, 3, 2, 1; (RR) round-robin stage; (Q#) qualification round; (DNQ) did not qualify; (A) absent; (NH) not held; (SR) strike rate (events won / competed); (W–L) win–loss record.

=== Singles ===
Tournament	1992	1993	1994	1995	1996	1997	1998	SR	W–L	Win %
Grand Slam tournaments
Australian Open	A	1R	A	1R	1R	3R	1R	0 / 5	2–5	29%
French Open	2R	1R	1R	2R	2R	1R	A	0 / 6	3–6	33%
Wimbledon	A	1R	A	A	A	A	A	0 / 1	0–1	0%
US Open	A	A	1R	1R	1R	1R	A	0 / 4	0–4	0%
Win–loss	1–1	0–3	0–2	1–3	1–3	2–3	0–1	0 / 16	5–16	24%
ATP Tour Masters 1000
Indian Wells	A	A	1R	Q3	1R	Q2	A	0 / 2	0–2	0%
Monte Carlo	A	A	2R	QF	1R	A	A	0 / 3	4–3	57%
Hamburg	A	A	1R	3R	QF	A	A	0 / 3	5–3	63%
Rome	A	A	1R	1R	1R	A	A	0 / 3	0–3	0%
Win–loss	0–0	0–0	1–4	5–3	3–4	0–0	0–0	0 / 11	9–11	45%
