= Marcelo Filippini =

Uruguayan tennis player

- Country (sports): Uruguay
- Residence: Montevideo, Uruguay
- Born: 4 August 1967 (age 59) Montevideo, Uruguay
- Height: 1.77 m (5 ft 10 in)
- Turned pro: 1987
- Retired: 2000
- Plays: Right-handed (one-handed backhand)
- Prize money: $2,034,890

Singles
- Career record: 244–250
- Career titles: 5
- Highest ranking: No. 30 (6 August 1990)

Grand Slam singles results
- Australian Open: 2R (1993)
- French Open: QF (1999)
- Wimbledon: 1R (1997, 1998, 1999)
- US Open: 2R (1997, 1998)

Other tournaments
- Olympic Games: 2R (1996)

Doubles
- Career record: 67–75
- Career titles: 3
- Highest ranking: No. 34 (31 July 1989)

Grand Slam doubles results
- French Open: 1R (1989, 1990)

Marcelo Filippini (born 4 August 1967) is a former professional tennis player from Uruguay.

In 1996, Filippini played what was the longest known game in ATP Tour history at Casablanca, going to deuce 20 times with Alberto Berasategui in one game of a 6–2, 6–3 first round loss. The game lasted 28 minutes (24–22 in total points for Berasategui).

Filippini's best performance at a Grand Slam event came at the French Open in 1999, where he reached (as a qualifier without dropping a set) the quarterfinals, defeating Laurence Tieleman, Martin Damm, Vince Spadea and Greg Rusedski before being knocked-out by eventual champion Andre Agassi. He also reached the quarterfinals of the 1993 Rome Masters.

== Career finals ==
=== Singles: 10 (5 wins – 5 losses) ===
Legend
Grand Slam (0–0)
Tennis Masters Cup (0–0)
ATP Masters Series (0–0)
ATP Tour (5–5)

Result	W/L	Date	Tournament	Draw	Surface	Opponent	Score
Win	1–0	Jul 1988	Båstad, Sweden	48	Clay	(Italy) Francesco Cancellotti	2–6, 6–4, 6–4
Loss	1–1	Sep 1988	Bari, Italy	32	Clay	(Austria) Thomas Muster	6–2, 1–6, 5–7
Win	2–1	Aug 1989	Prague, Czechoslovakia	32	Clay	(Austria) Horst Skoff	7–5, 7–6^{(7–4)}
Loss	2–2.	Nov 1990	Itaparica, Brazil	32	Hard	(Sweden) Mats Wilander	1–6, 2–6
Loss	2–3	May 1991	Madrid, Spain	32	Clay	(Spain) Jordi Arrese	2–6, 4–6
Win	3–3	Jun 1994	Florence, Italy	32	Clay	(Australia) Richard Fromberg	3–6, 6–3, 6–3
Loss	3–4	May 1995	Bologna, Italy	32	Clay	(Chile) Marcelo Ríos	2–6, 4–6
Loss	3–5	Apr 1996	Bermuda, Bermuda	32	Clay	(United States) MaliVai Washington	7–6^{(8–6)}, 4–6, 5–7
Win	4–5	May 1997	Atlanta, US	32	Clay	(Australia) Jason Stoltenberg	7–6^{(7–2)}, 6–4
Win	5–5	May 1997	St. Pölten, Austria	32	Clay	(Australia) Patrick Rafter	7–6^{(7–2)}, 6–2

=== Doubles: 5 (3 wins – 2 losses) ===
Legend
Grand Slam (0–0)
Tennis Masters Cup (0–0)
ATP Masters Series (0–0)
ATP Tour (3–2)

Result	W/L	Date	Tournament	Draw	Surface	Partner	Opponents	Score
Win	1–0	Oct 1988	Palermo, Italy	24	Clay	(Peru) Carlos di Laura	(Argentina) Alberto Mancini (Argentina) Christian Miniussi	6–2, 6–0
Loss	1–1	Apr 1990	Nice, France	15	Clay	(Austria) Horst Skoff	(Argentina) Alberto Mancini (France) Yannick Noah	4–6, 6–7
Win	2–1	Jun 1992	Florence, Italy	16	Clay	(Brazil) Luiz Mattar	(South Africa) Royce Deppe (South Africa) Brent Haygarth	6–4, 6–7, 6–4
Loss	2–2	Nov 1992	Athens, Greece	16	Clay	(Netherlands) Mark Koevermans	(Spain) Tomás Carbonell (Spain) Francisco Roig	3–6, 4–6
Win	3–2	Nov 1994	Montevideo, Uruguay	16	Clay	(Brazil) Luiz Mattar	(Spain) Sergio Casal (Spain) Emilio Sánchez	7–6, 6–4

Olympic Games
Preceded by Ricardo Fabini	Flagbearer for Uruguay; 1996 Atlanta	Succeeded by Mónica Falcioni
