= 1994 Copenhagen Open – Doubles =

Doubles
- 1994 Copenhagen Open

Final
- Champions: (Czech Republic) Martin Damm (New Zealand) Brett Steven
- Runners-up: (Germany) David Prinosil (Germany) Udo Riglewski
- Score: 6–3, 6–4

Events
Singles	Doubles
← 1993 ·	Copenhagen Open	· 1995 →

David Adams and Andrei Olhovskiy were the defending champions, but lost in the first round to Yevgeny Kafelnikov and Menno Oosting.

Martin Damm and Brett Steven won the title by defeating David Prinosil and Udo Riglewski 6–3, 6–4 in the final.

== Seeds ==
1. (South Africa) David Adams / (Russia) Andrei Olhovskiy (first round)
2. (Sweden) Henrik Holm / (Sweden) Anders Järryd (quarterfinals)
3. (Germany) David Prinosil / (Germany) Udo Riglewski (final)
4. (Spain) Tomás Carbonell / (Belgium) Libor Pimek (first round)

== Draw ==
=== Key ===
- Q = Qualifier
- WC = Wild card
- LL = Lucky loser
- Alt = Alternate
- ITF = ITF entry
- PR = Protected ranking
- SR = Special ranking
- SE = Special exempt
- JE = Junior exempt
- JR = Junior Accelerator Programme entrant
- CO = College Accelerator Programme entrant
- NG = Next Gen Accelerator Program entrant
- w/o = Walkover
- r = Retired
- d = Defaulted

=== Draw ===
First round
1	(South Africa) D Adams (Russia) A Olhovskiy	4	4
(Russia) Y Kafelnikov (Netherlands) M Oosting	6	6
(Sweden) J Björkman (Norway) BO Pedersen	7	6
(South Africa) S Kruger (South Africa) P Norval	5	4
3	(Germany) D Prinosil (Germany) U Riglewski	3	7	6
Q	(Germany) P Baur (Sweden) P Nyborg	6	6	2
(United States) B Garnett (United States) TJ Middleton	6	6
(Italy) C Brandi (Venezuela) M Ruah	3	3
WC	(Sweden) M Larsson (Denmark) M Mortensen	7	6
WC	(Denmark) M Christensen (Denmark) K Carlsen	6	3
(Czech Republic) M Damm (New Zealand) B Steven	6	6	6
4	(Spain) T Carbonell (Belgium) L Pimek	3	7	4
(Netherlands) M Schapers (Czech Republic) D Vacek	6	6
(Germany) C Saceanu (Netherlands) J Siemerink	7	7
(United Kingdom) N Broad (South Africa) J de Beer	6	4
2	(Sweden) H Holm (Sweden) A Järryd	7	6

Quarterfinals
(Russia) Y Kafelnikov (Netherlands) M Oosting	2	6	4
(Sweden) J Björkman (Norway) BO Pedersen	6	3	6
3	(Germany) D Prinosil (Germany) U Riglewski	6	7	6
(United States) B Garnett (United States) TJ Middleton	7	6	1
WC	(Sweden) M Larsson (Denmark) M Mortensen	3	4
(Czech Republic) M Damm (New Zealand) B Steven	6	6
(Germany) C Saceanu (Netherlands) J Siemerink	5	7	6
2	(Sweden) H Holm (Sweden) A Järryd	7	5	4

Semifinals
(Sweden) J Björkman (Norway) BO Pedersen	5	4
3	(Germany) D Prinosil (Germany) U Riglewski	7	6
(Czech Republic) M Damm (New Zealand) B Steven	6	7
(Germany) C Saceanu (Netherlands) J Siemerink	3	6

Final
3	(Germany) D Prinosil (Germany) U Riglewski	6	6
(Czech Republic) M Damm (New Zealand) B Steven	3	4
