= 1995 Copenhagen Open – Doubles =

Doubles
- 1995 Copenhagen Open

Final
- Champions: (United States) Mark Keil (Sweden) Peter Nyborg
- Runners-up: (France) Guillaume Raoux (Canada) Greg Rusedski
- Score: 6–7, 6–4, 7–6

Details
- Draw: 16
- Seeds: 4

Events
Singles	Doubles
← 1994 ·	Copenhagen Open	· 1996 →

Martin Damm and Brett Steven were the defending champions, but none competed this year.

Mark Keil and Peter Nyborg won the title by defeating Guillaume Raoux and Greg Rusedski 6–7, 6–4, 7–6 in the final.

== Seeds ==
1. (Czech Republic) Cyril Suk / (Czech Republic) Daniel Vacek (first round)
2. (Russia) Andrei Olhovskiy / (Netherlands) Jan Siemerink (first round)
3. (Netherlands) Tom Nijssen / (Netherlands) Menno Oosting (semifinals)
4. (Netherlands) Hendrik Jan Davids / (Canada) Sébastien Lareau (semifinals)

== Draw ==
=== Key ===
- Q = Qualifier
- WC = Wild card
- LL = Lucky loser
- Alt = Alternate
- SE = Special exempt
- PR = Protected ranking
- ITF = ITF entry
- JE = Junior exempt
- w/o = Walkover
- r = Retired
- d = Defaulted
- SR = Special ranking

=== Draw ===
First round
1	(Czech Republic) C Suk (Czech Republic) D Vacek	5	6
(France) G Raoux (Canada) G Rusedski	7	7
WC	(Australia) P Cash (Russia) A Volkov	7	6	5
(Italy) C Brandi (Belgium) L Pimek	6	7	7
4	(Netherlands) HJ Davids (Canada) S Lareau	6	6
Q	(Sweden) O Kristiansson (Czech Republic) P Pála	1	1
(Austria) A Antonitsch (Germany) U Riglewski	6	6	6
WC	(Denmark) K Carlsen (Denmark) F Fetterlein	4	7	7
(Australia) W Arthurs (Australia) J Ireland	6	3
(South Africa) M Barnard (France) JP Fleurian	7	6
(Netherlands) S Noteboom (France) S Simian	5	6	6
3	(Netherlands) T Nijssen (Netherlands) M Oosting	7	4	7
(United States) M Keil (Sweden) P Nyborg	6	7	7
WC	(Germany) K Braasch (Denmark) M Christensen	7	6	6
(Switzerland) J Hlasek (Sweden) A Järryd	6	6
2	(Russia) A Olhovskiy (Netherlands) J Siemerink	4	3

Quarterfinals
(France) G Raoux (Canada) G Rusedski	6	6	6
(Italy) C Brandi (Belgium) L Pimek	4	7	1
4	(Netherlands) HJ Davids (Canada) S Lareau	w/o
WC	(Denmark) K Carlsen (Denmark) F Fetterlein
(South Africa) M Barnard (France) JP Fleurian	3	3
3	(Netherlands) T Nijssen (Netherlands) M Oosting	6	6
(United States) M Keil (Sweden) P Nyborg	6	7
(Switzerland) J Hlasek (Sweden) A Järryd	4	6

Semifinals
(France) G Raoux (Canada) G Rusedski	7	7
4	(Netherlands) HJ Davids (Canada) S Lareau	6	6
3	(Netherlands) T Nijssen (Netherlands) M Oosting	5	4
(United States) M Keil (Sweden) P Nyborg	7	6

Final
(France) G Raoux (Canada) G Rusedski	7	4	6
(United States) M Keil (Sweden) P Nyborg	6	6	7
