= 1994 Copenhagen Open – Singles =

Singles
- 1994 Copenhagen Open

Final
- Champion: (Russia) Yevgeny Kafelnikov
- Runner-up: (Czech Republic) Daniel Vacek
- Score: 6–3, 7–5

Details
- Draw: 32 (3WC/4Q)
- Seeds: 8

Events
Singles	Doubles
← 1993 ·	Copenhagen Open	· 1995 →

Andrei Olhovskiy was the defending champion, but lost in the quarterfinals to Daniel Vacek.

Yevgeny Kafelnikov won the title by defeating Daniel Vacek 6–3, 7–5 in the final.

== Seeds ==
1. (Sweden) Magnus Gustafsson (quarterfinals)
2. (Sweden) Jonas Svensson (first round)
3. (Sweden) Magnus Larsson (second round)
4. (Russia) Yevgeny Kafelnikov (champion)
5. (Sweden) Henrik Holm (first round)
6. (Sweden) Thomas Enqvist (first round)
7. (New Zealand) Brett Steven (first round)
8. (Russia) Andrei Olhovskiy (quarterfinals)

== Draw ==
=== Key ===
- Q = Qualifier
- WC = Wild card
- LL = Lucky loser
- Alt = Alternate
- ITF = ITF entry
- PR = Protected ranking
- SR = Special ranking
- SE = Special exempt
- JE = Junior exempt
- JR = Junior Accelerator Programme entrant
- CO = College Accelerator Programme entrant
- NG = Next Gen Accelerator Program entrant
- w/o = Walkover
- r = Retired
- d = Defaulted

=== Finals ===
Semifinals
(Austria) Alex Antonitsch	5	7	3
4	(Russia) Yevgeny Kafelnikov	7	5	6
(France) Jean-Philippe Fleurian	2	6^{1}
(Czech Republic) Daniel Vacek	6	7^{7}

Final
4	(Russia) Yevgeny Kafelnikov	6	7
(Czech Republic) Daniel Vacek	3	5

=== Top half ===
First round
1	(Sweden) M Gustafsson	6	5	6
(Sweden) C Bergström	2	7	4
WC	(Netherlands) J Siemerink	6	7
Q	(France) L Roux	4	5
(Venezuela) M Ruah	3	1
(Spain) T Carbonell	6	6
(Austria) A Antonitsch	6	6
7	(New Zealand) B Steven	3	3
4	(Russia) Y Kafelnikov	6^{5}	6	6
(France) S Simian	7^{7}	4	0
WC	(Denmark) F Fetterlein	2	6^{5}
(Sweden) J Björkman	6	7^{7}
(France) G Raoux	7	6
(Germany) D Prinosil	5	2
Q	(Germany) P Baur	6	3	7^{8}
6	(Sweden) T Enqvist	4	6	6^{6}

Second round
1	(Sweden) M Gustafsson	6	7^{7}
WC	(Netherlands) J Siemerink	3	6^{3}
(Spain) T Carbonell	4	4
(Austria) A Antonitsch	6	6
4	(Russia) Y Kafelnikov	6	6
(Sweden) J Björkman	1	4
(France) G Raoux	6^{4}	3
Q	(Germany) P Baur	7^{7}	6

Quarterfinals
1	(Sweden) M Gustafsson	6	1	5
(Austria) A Antonitsch	1	6	7
4	(Russia) Y Kafelnikov	7	7^{7}
Q	(Germany) P Baur	5	6^{5}

Semifinals
(Austria) A Antonitsch	5	7	3
4	(Russia) Y Kafelnikov	7	5	6

=== Bottom half ===
First round
5	(Sweden) H Holm	5	3
(France) JP Fleurian	7	6
(Czech Republic) M Damm	6	6^{4}	4
WC	(Denmark) M Christensen	4	7^{7}	6
(Italy) O Camporese	5	3
(Denmark) K Carlsen	7	6
(United Kingdom) J Bates	3	0
3	(Sweden) M Larsson	6	6
8	(Russia) A Olhovskiy	7	6
Q	(Sweden) P Lundgren	5	3
Q	(Germany) P Moraing	6	6
(Switzerland) J Hlasek	4	3
(Czech Republic) D Vacek	6	6
(France) R Gilbert	4	2
(Sweden) A Järryd	6	6
2	(Sweden) J Svensson	3	1

Second round
(France) JP Fleurian	6	6
WC	(Denmark) M Christensen	4	4
(Denmark) K Carlsen	4	7^{7}	6
3	(Sweden) M Larsson	6	6^{5}	4
8	(Russia) A Olhovskiy	7^{7}	1	6
Q	(Germany) P Moraing	6^{2}	6	3
(Czech Republic) D Vacek	4	7	7^{7}
(Sweden) A Järryd	6	5	6^{5}

Quarterfinals
(France) JP Fleurian	6	6
(Denmark) K Carlsen	3	4
8	(Russia) A Olhovskiy	7^{7}	3	2
(Czech Republic) D Vacek	6^{0}	6	6

Semifinals
(France) JP Fleurian	2	6^{1}
(Czech Republic) D Vacek	6	7^{7}
