= 1993 Copenhagen Open – Doubles =

Doubles
- 1993 Copenhagen Open

Final
- Champions: (South Africa) David Adams (Russia) Andrei Olhovskiy
- Runners-up: (Czech Republic) Martin Damm (Czech Republic) Daniel Vacek
- Score: 6–3, 3–6, 6–3

Events
Singles	Doubles
← 1992 ·	Copenhagen Open	· 1994 →

The 1993 Copenhagen Open doubles was the doubles event of the fifth edition of the Copenhagen Open, a tennis tournament held in Copenhagen, Denmark which was part of the ATP World Series and part of the European early indoor court season. Nicklas Kulti and Magnus Larsson were the defending champions, but were forced to withdraw before their semifinal match.

David Adams and Andrei Olhovskiy won the title by defeating Martin Damm and Daniel Vacek 6–3, 3–6, 6–3 in the final.

== Seeds ==
1. (South Africa) David Adams / (Russia) Andrei Olhovskiy (champions)
2. (South Africa) Piet Norval / (Belgium) Libor Pimek (first round)
3. (Sweden) Ronnie Båthman / (Sweden) Rikard Bergh (quarterfinals)
4. (Sweden) Anders Järryd / (Denmark) Michael Mortensen (quarterfinals)

== Draw ==
=== Key ===
- Q = Qualifier
- WC = Wild card
- LL = Lucky loser
- Alt = Alternate
- SE = Special exempt
- PR = Protected ranking
- ITF = ITF entry
- JE = Junior exempt
- w/o = Walkover
- r = Retired
- d = Defaulted
- SR = Special ranking

=== Draw ===
First round
1	(South Africa) D Adams (Russia) A Olhovskiy	7	6
(Finland) O Rahnasto (Spain) F Roig	5	3
Q	(France) O Delaître (France) G Raoux	6	3
LL	(Denmark) F Fetterlein (Germany) C Saceanu	7	6
3	(Sweden) R Båthman (Sweden) R Bergh	6	7	6
(Czech Republic) V Flégl (Sweden) T Svantesson	7	6	4
(Sweden) J Björkman (Sweden) O Jonsson	6	5	5
(Germany) MK Goellner (Germany) D Prinosil	4	7	7
(Netherlands) M Oosting (Germany) U Riglewski	6	4
(Czech Republic) M Damm (Czech Republic) D Vacek	7	6
LL	(Sweden) P Lundgren (Sweden) LA Wahlgren	2	3
4	(Sweden) A Järryd (Denmark) M Mortensen	6	6
WC	(Sweden) N Kulti (Sweden) M Larsson	3	7	6
(Latvia) Ģ Dzelde (New Zealand) B Steven	6	6	4
(Sweden) H Holm (Norway) BO Pedersen	6	6
2	(South Africa) P Norval (Belgium) L Pimek	4	4

Quarterfinals
1	(South Africa) D Adams (Russia) A Olhovskiy	6	6
LL	(Denmark) F Fetterlein (Germany) C Saceanu	3	4
3	(Sweden) R Båthman (Sweden) R Bergh	4	4
(Germany) MK Goellner (Germany) D Prinosil	6	6
(Czech Republic) M Damm (Czech Republic) D Vacek	6	7	7
4	(Sweden) A Järryd (Denmark) M Mortensen	7	5	6
WC	(Sweden) N Kulti (Sweden) M Larsson	7	6
(Sweden) H Holm (Norway) BO Pedersen	5	4

Semifinals
1	(South Africa) D Adams (Russia) A Olhovskiy	6	6	6
(Germany) MK Goellner (Germany) D Prinosil	7	4	4
(Czech Republic) M Damm (Czech Republic) D Vacek	w/o
WC	(Sweden) N Kulti (Sweden) M Larsson

Final
1	(South Africa) D Adams (Russia) A Olhovskiy	6	3	6
(Czech Republic) M Damm (Czech Republic) D Vacek	3	6	3
