= 1993 Copenhagen Open – Singles =

Singles
- 1993 Copenhagen Open

Final
- Champion: (Russia) Andrei Olhovskiy
- Runner-up: (Sweden) Nicklas Kulti
- Score: 7–5, 3–6, 6–2

Details
- Draw: 32 (3WC/4Q)
- Seeds: 8

Events
Singles	Doubles
← 1992 ·	Copenhagen Open	· 1994 →

The 1993 Copenhagen Open singles was the singles event of the fifth edition of the Copenhagen Open, a tennis tournament held in Copenhagen, Denmark which was part of the ATP World Series and part of the European early indoor court season. Magnus Larsson was the defending champion, but was forced to withdraw before his Semifinal match.

Andrei Olhovskiy won the title by defeating Nicklas Kulti 7–5, 3–6, 6–2 in the final.

== Seeds ==
1. (Sweden) Henrik Holm (second round)
2. (Sweden) Magnus Larsson (semifinals, withdrew)
3. (Israel) Amos Mansdorf (quarterfinals)
4. (Netherlands) Paul Haarhuis (first round)
5. (Sweden) Nicklas Kulti (final)
6. (Sweden) Christian Bergström (first round, retired)
7. (New Zealand) Brett Steven (semifinals)
8. (Denmark) Kenneth Carlsen (first round)

== Draw ==
=== Key ===
- Q = Qualifier
- WC = Wild card
- LL = Lucky loser
- Alt = Alternate
- SE = Special exempt
- PR = Protected ranking
- ITF = ITF entry
- JE = Junior exempt
- w/o = Walkover
- r = Retired
- d = Defaulted
- SR = Special ranking

=== Finals ===
Semifinals
7	(New Zealand) Brett Steven	6^{4}	4
5	(Sweden) Nicklas Kulti	7^{7}	6
(Russia) Andrei Olhovskiy	w/o
2	(Sweden) Magnus Larsson

Final
5	(Sweden) Nicklas Kulti	5	6	2
(Russia) Andrei Olhovskiy	7	3	6

=== Top half ===
First round
1	(Sweden) H Holm	6	6
(Italy) G Pozzi	3	4
Q	(Germany) A Thoms	5	3
(Germany) D Prinosil	7	6
Q	(Sweden) M Gustafsson	6	6^{5}	4
WC	(Denmark) M Christensen	4	7^{7}	6
(France) S Simian	6^{1}	7	2
7	(New Zealand) B Steven	7^{7}	5	6
4	(Netherlands) P Haarhuis	6	6^{6}	4
(Czech Republic) M Damm	4	7^{8}	6
(Croatia) G Prpić	6	7^{7}
(Sweden) J Svensson	3	6^{4}
Q	(Sweden) N Kroon	4	2
(Italy) O Camporese	6	6
(Canada) C Pridham	4	2
5	(Sweden) N Kulti	6	6

Second round
1	(Sweden) H Holm	4	6	2
(Germany) D Prinosil	6	2	6
WC	(Denmark) M Christensen	3	4
7	(New Zealand) B Steven	6	6
(Czech Republic) M Damm	3	3
(Croatia) G Prpić	6	6
(Italy) O Camporese	4	4
5	(Sweden) N Kulti	6	6

Quarterfinals
(Germany) D Prinosil	3	6	3
7	(New Zealand) B Steven	6	3	6
(Croatia) G Prpić	4	3
5	(Sweden) N Kulti	6	6

Semifinals
7	(New Zealand) B Steven	6^{4}	4
5	(Sweden) N Kulti	7^{7}	6

=== Bottom half ===
First round
6	(Sweden) C Bergström	3^{r}
(Russia) A Olhovskiy	3
(France) O Delaître	6	1	1
SE	(Sweden) A Järryd	4	6	6
(Spain) F Roig	6	6
(Italy) D Nargiso	4	2
WC	(Denmark) F Fetterlein	6	6^{2}	2
3	(Israel) A Mansdorf	4	7^{7}	6
8	(Denmark) K Carlsen	3	4
(France) G Raoux	6	6
WC	(Denmark) C Camradt	3	2
Q	(Sweden) J Björkman	6	6
(Belgium) B Wuyts	4	4
(Germany) MK Goellner	6	6
(Germany) K Braasch	7	4	4
2	(Sweden) M Larsson	5	6	6

Second round
(Russia) A Olhovskiy	7	6
SE	(Sweden) A Järryd	5	3
(Spain) F Roig	3	0
3	(Israel) A Mansdorf	6	6
(France) G Raoux	7	4	6
Q	(Sweden) J Björkman	5	6	2
(Germany) MK Goellner	1	2
2	(Sweden) M Larsson	6	6

Quarterfinals
(Russia) A Olhovskiy	6	6
3	(Israel) A Mansdorf	4	4
(France) G Raoux	3	4
2	(Sweden) M Larsson	6	6

Semifinals
(Russia) A Olhovskiy	w/o
2	(Sweden) M Larsson
