= 1995 Copenhagen Open =

- Date: 6–12 March
- Edition: 7th
- Category: World Series
- Draw: 32S / 16D
- Prize money: $203,000
- Surface: Carpet / indoor
- Location: Copenhagen, Denmark

Champions

Singles
- (Germany) Martin Sinner

Doubles
- (United States) Mark Keil / (Sweden) Peter Nyborg
← 1994 ·	Copenhagen Open	· 1996 →

The 1995 Copenhagen Open was a men's tennis tournament played on indoor carpet courts in Copenhagen, Denmark that was part of the World Series of the 1995 ATP Tour. It was the seventh edition of the tournament and was held from 6 March until 12 March 1995. Unseeded Martin Sinner won the singles title.

== Finals ==
=== Singles ===
(Germany) Martin Sinner defeated (Russia) Andrei Olhovskiy, 6–7^{(3–7)}, 7–6^{(10–8)}, 6–3

- It was Sinners' first singles title of his career.

=== Doubles ===
(United States) Mark Keil / (Sweden) Peter Nyborg defeated (France) Guillaume Raoux / (United Kingdom) Greg Rusedski, 6–7, 6–4, 7–6
