= 1995 Copenhagen Open – Singles =

Singles
- 1995 Copenhagen Open

Final
- Champion: (Germany) Martin Sinner
- Runner-up: (Russia) Andrei Olhovskiy
- Score: 6–7^{(3–7)}, 7–6^{(10–8)}, 6–3

Details
- Draw: 32 (3WC/4Q)
- Seeds: 8

Events
Singles	Doubles
← 1994 ·	Copenhagen Open	· 1996 →

Yevgeny Kafelnikov was the defending champion, but did not compete this year.

Martin Sinner won the title by defeating Andrei Olhovskiy 6–7^{(3–7)}, 7–6^{(10–8)}, 6–3 in the final.

== Seeds ==
1. (Czech Republic) Sláva Doseděl (second round)
2. (Russia) Alexander Volkov (first round)
3. (Czech Republic) Daniel Vacek (first round)
4. (Netherlands) Jan Siemerink (quarterfinals)
5. (Slovakia) Karol Kučera (semifinals)
6. (Spain) Tomás Carbonell (second round)
7. (United Kingdom) Jeremy Bates (quarterfinals)
8. (Italy) Gianluca Pozzi (first round)

== Draw ==
=== Key ===
- Q = Qualifier
- WC = Wild card
- LL = Lucky loser
- Alt = Alternate
- ITF = ITF entry
- PR = Protected ranking
- SR = Special ranking
- SE = Special exempt
- JE = Junior exempt
- JR = Junior Accelerator Programme entrant
- CO = College Accelerator Programme entrant
- NG = Next Gen Accelerator Program entrant
- w/o = Walkover
- r = Retired
- d = Defaulted

=== Finals ===
Semifinals
(Russia) Andrei Olhovskiy	6	6
5	(Slovakia) Karol Kučera	2	0
(Sweden) Anders Järryd	6	4	4
(Germany) Martin Sinner	3	6	6

Final
(Russia) Andrei Olhovskiy	7^{7}	6^{8}	3
(Germany) Martin Sinner	6^{3}	7^{10}	6

=== Top half ===
First round
1	(Czech Republic) S Doseděl	6	6
WC	(Denmark) P Langvardt	4	4
(Germany) L Rehmann	6^{4}	2
(Russia) A Olhovskiy	7^{7}	6
(Denmark) K Carlsen	6^{5}	4
(Canada) S Lareau	7^{7}	6
(Germany) J Renzenbrink	2	6^{5}
7	(United Kingdom) J Bates	6	7^{7}
4	(Netherlands) J Siemerink	6	6
(Germany) D Prinosil	4	4
(Italy) C Caratti	4	6^{6}
(Switzerland) J Hlasek	6	7^{8}
Q	(Netherlands) J Winnink	4	3
Q	(Sweden) P Lundgren	6	6
Q	(France) S Simian	3	4
5	(Slovakia) K Kučera	6	6

Second round
1	(Czech Republic) S Doseděl	3	4
(Russia) A Olhovskiy	6	6
(Canada) S Lareau	6^{10}	5
7	(United Kingdom) J Bates	7^{12}	7
4	(Netherlands) J Siemerink	7^{7}	6^{5}	6
(Switzerland) J Hlasek	6^{5}	7^{7}	1
Q	(Sweden) P Lundgren	6^{3}	3
5	(Slovakia) K Kučera	7^{7}	6

Quarterfinals
(Russia) A Olhovskiy	6	6
7	(United Kingdom) J Bates	1	0
4	(Netherlands) J Siemerink	4	4
5	(Slovakia) K Kučera	6	6

Semifinals
(Russia) A Olhovskiy	6	6
5	(Slovakia) K Kučera	2	0

=== Bottom half ===
First round
6	(Spain) T Carbonell	6	6
(France) G Raoux	0	4
(Germany) A Mronz	4	2
(Sweden) A Järryd	6	6
(Germany) CU Steeb	6^{3}	2
(Canada) G Rusedski	7^{7}	6
WC	(Australia) P Cash	7^{7}	4	7^{8}
3	(Czech Republic) D Vacek	6^{1}	6	6^{6}
8	(Italy) G Pozzi	4	6^{5}
WC	(Denmark) F Fetterlein	6	7^{7}
(Kenya) P Wekesa	6^{4}	3
(Brazil) L Mattar	7^{7}	6
(France) JP Fleurian	6	6
Q	(United Kingdom) D Sapsford	3	4
(Germany) M Sinner	6	6^{5}	6
2	(Russia) A Volkov	4	7^{7}	1

Second round
6	(Spain) T Carbonell	3	4
(Sweden) A Järryd	6	6
(Canada) G Rusedski	6	6^{6}	6^{3}
WC	(Australia) P Cash	3	7^{8}	7^{7}
WC	(Denmark) F Fetterlein	6	6
(Brazil) L Mattar	4	4
(France) JP Fleurian	4	3
(Germany) M Sinner	6	6

Quarterfinals
(Sweden) A Järryd	6	3	6
WC	(Australia) P Cash	1	6	2
WC	(Denmark) F Fetterlein	5	5
(Germany) M Sinner	7	7

Semifinals
(Sweden) A Järryd	6	4	4
(Germany) M Sinner	3	6	6
