= 1992 Copenhagen Open – Doubles =

Doubles
- 1992 Copenhagen Open

Final
- Champions: (Sweden) Nicklas Kulti (Sweden) Magnus Larsson
- Runners-up: (Netherlands) Hendrik Jan Davids (Belgium) Libor Pimek
- Score: 6–3, 6–4

Events
Singles	Doubles
← 1991 ·	Copenhagen Open	· 1993 →

Todd Woodbridge and Mark Woodforde were the defending champions, but decided to compete at Indian Wells in the same week.

Nicklas Kulti and Magnus Larsson won the title by defeating Hendrik Jan Davids and Libor Pimek 6–3, 6–4 in the final.

== Seeds ==
1. (Netherlands) Hendrik Jan Davids / (Belgium) Libor Pimek (final)
2. (Italy) Diego Nargiso / (Germany) Udo Riglewski (quarterfinals)
3. (Netherlands) Jacco Eltingh / (Netherlands) Tom Kempers (quarterfinals)
4. (Zimbabwe) Byron Black / (United States) Scott Melville (quarterfinals)

== Draw ==
=== Key ===
- Q = Qualifier
- WC = Wild card
- LL = Lucky loser
- Alt = Alternate
- SE = Special exempt
- PR = Protected ranking
- ITF = ITF entry
- JE = Junior exempt
- w/o = Walkover
- r = Retired
- d = Defaulted
- SR = Special ranking

=== Draw ===
First round
1	(Netherlands) HJ Davids (Belgium) L Pimek	6	6
(Sweden) J Apell (Sweden) J Gunnarsson	4	1
(Finland) O Rahnasto (Kenya) P Wekesa	6	7
(Sweden) P Henricsson (Sweden) O Jonsson	1	6
3	(Netherlands) J Eltingh (Netherlands) T Kempers	6	6	7
WC	(Denmark) K Carlsen (Denmark) F Fetterlein	3	7	6
Q	(South Africa) L Bale (Belgium) X Daufresne	1	2
(Australia) B Dyke (Sweden) P Lundgren	6	6
WC	(Sweden) N Kulti (Sweden) M Larsson	7	7
(Commonwealth of Independent States) Ģ Dzelde (United States) T Scherman	5	5
(Sweden) N Holm (United States) J Sobel	0	0
4	(Zimbabwe) B Black (United States) S Melville	6	6
(Netherlands) M Schapers (Sweden) J Svensson	6	3	6
(Austria) A Antonitsch (Netherlands) M Oosting	3	6	7
(Sweden) A Järryd (Denmark) M Mortensen	5	3
2	(Italy) D Nargiso (Germany) U Riglewski	7	6

Quarterfinals
1	(Netherlands) HJ Davids (Belgium) L Pimek	6	3	6
(Finland) O Rahnasto (Kenya) P Wekesa	4	6	3
3	(Netherlands) J Eltingh (Netherlands) T Kempers	3	7	4
(Australia) B Dyke (Sweden) P Lundgren	6	5	6
WC	(Sweden) N Kulti (Sweden) M Larsson	7	6
4	(Zimbabwe) B Black (United States) S Melville	5	3
(Austria) A Antonitsch (Netherlands) M Oosting	6	6
2	(Italy) D Nargiso (Germany) U Riglewski	4	3

Semifinals
1	(Netherlands) HJ Davids (Belgium) L Pimek	6	6	6
(Australia) B Dyke (Sweden) P Lundgren	7	2	2
WC	(Sweden) N Kulti (Sweden) M Larsson	7	6
(Austria) A Antonitsch (Netherlands) M Oosting	6	2

Final
1	(Netherlands) HJ Davids (Belgium) L Pimek	3	4
WC	(Sweden) N Kulti (Sweden) M Larsson	6	6
