= 1993 Copenhagen Open =

- Date: 1–7 March
- Edition: 5th
- Category: World Series
- Draw: 32S / 16D
- Prize money: $175,000
- Surface: Carpet / indoor
- Location: Copenhagen, Denmark

Champions

Singles
- (Russia) Andrei Olhovskiy

Doubles
- (South Africa) David Adams / (Russia) Andrei Olhovskiy
← 1992 ·	Copenhagen Open	· 1994 →

The 1993 Copenhagen Open was a men's tennis tournament played on indoor carpet courts in Copenhagen, Denmark that was part of the World Series of the 1993 ATP Tour. It was the sixth edition of the tournament and was held from 1 March 1 until 7 March 1993. Unseeded Andrei Olhovskiy won the singles title.

== Finals ==
=== Singles ===
(Russia) Andrei Olhovskiy defeated (Sweden) Nicklas Kulti, 7–5, 3–6, 6–2

- It was Olhovskiy's only singles title of the year and the first of his career.

=== Doubles ===
(South Africa) David Adams / (Russia) Andrei Olhovskiy defeated (Czech Republic) Martin Damm / (Czech Republic) Daniel Vacek, 6–3, 3–6, 6–3
