= 1992 Copenhagen Open – Singles =

Singles
- 1992 Copenhagen Open

Final
- Champion: (Sweden) Magnus Larsson
- Runner-up: (Sweden) Anders Järryd
- Score: 6–4, 7–6^{(7–5)}

Details
- Draw: 32 (3WC/4Q)
- Seeds: 8

Events
| Singles | Doubles |
| ← 1991 · | Copenhagen Open | · 1993 → |

Jonas Svensson was the defending champion, but lost in the second round to Jacco Eltingh.

Magnus Larsson won the title by defeating Anders Järryd 6–4, 7–6^{(7–5)} in the final.

== Seeds ==
1. (Commonwealth of Independent States) Alexander Volkov (first round)
2. (Sweden) Christian Bergström (second round)
3. (Netherlands) Jan Siemerink (first round)
4. (Sweden) Anders Järryd (final)
5. (Sweden) Jonas Svensson (second round)
6. (Netherlands) Michiel Schapers (first round)
7. (Germany) Lars Koslowski (first round)
8. (Sweden) Magnus Larsson (champion)

== Draw ==
=== Key ===
- Q = Qualifier
- WC = Wild card
- LL = Lucky loser
- Alt = Alternate
- SE = Special exempt
- PR = Protected ranking
- ITF = ITF entry
- JE = Junior exempt
- w/o = Walkover
- r = Retired
- d = Defaulted
- SR = Special ranking

=== Finals ===
Semifinals
(Italy) Diego Nargiso | 2 | 6 | 5
4 | (Sweden) Anders Järryd | 6 | 3 | 7
(Germany) Christian Saceanu | 7^{9} | 6^{3} | 4
8 | (Sweden) Magnus Larsson | 6^{7} | 7^{7} | 6

Final
4 | (Sweden) Anders Järryd | 4 | 6^{5}
8 | (Sweden) Magnus Larsson | 6 | 7^{7}

=== Top half ===
First round
1 | (Commonwealth of Independent States) A Volkov | 4 | 7^{8} | 4
WC | (Denmark) K Carlsen | 6 | 6^{6} | 6
(Czechoslovakia) M Střelba | 6^{5} | 6 | 6
WC | (Denmark) F Fetterlein | 7^{7} | 3 | 4
(Sweden) J Gunnarsson | 1 | 6^{2}
(Italy) D Nargiso | 6 | 7^{7}
(Belgium) E Masso | 6 | 6
7 | (Germany) L Koslowski | 3 | 3
4 | (Sweden) A Järryd | 6 | 6
Q | (Germany) U Riglewski | 4 | 1
(Austria) A Antonitsch | 3 | 1
Q | (Sweden) J Apell | 6 | 6
(Netherlands) J Eltingh | 6 | 6
(Germany) A Mronz | 3 | 2
(Zimbabwe) B Black | 4 | 4
5/WC | (Sweden) J Svensson | 6 | 6

Second round
WC | (Denmark) K Carlsen | 6 | 6
(Czechoslovakia) M Střelba | 0 | 4
(Italy) D Nargiso | 6 | 7^{7}
(Belgium) E Masso | 3 | 6^{4}
4 | (Sweden) A Järryd | 7^{7} | 4 | 6
Q | (Sweden) J Apell | 6^{5} | 6 | 2
(Netherlands) J Eltingh | 6 | 6^{8} | 6
5/WC | (Sweden) J Svensson | 3 | 7^{10} | 4

Quarterfinals
WC | (Denmark) K Carlsen | 5 | 6^{4}
(Italy) D Nargiso | 7 | 7^{7}
4 | (Sweden) A Järryd | 6 | 6
(Netherlands) J Eltingh | 1 | 2

Semifinals
(Italy) D Nargiso | 2 | 6 | 5
4 | (Sweden) A Järryd | 6 | 3 | 7

=== Bottom half ===
First round
6 | (Netherlands) M Schapers | 2 | 7 | 5
(Sweden) P Lundgren | 6 | 5 | 7
(Germany) P Kühnen | 4 | 3
(Sweden) N Kulti | 6 | 6
(Czechoslovakia) M Vajda | 6^{2} | 4
(Germany) C Saceanu | 7^{7} | 6
(Peru) P Arraya | 7 | 6
3 | (Netherlands) J Siemerink | 5 | 2
8 | (Sweden) M Larsson | 6 | 7^{7}
Q | (Sweden) LA Wahlgren | 4 | 6^{4}
(Sweden) D Engel | 3 | 7^{7} | 6
(Sweden) L Jönsson | 6 | 6^{4} | 4
Q | (Belgium) X Daufresne | 6 | 6^{5} | 6^{4}
(Germany) P Baur | 4 | 7^{7} | 7^{7}
(Belgium) B Wuyts | 2 | 1
2 | (Sweden) C Bergström | 6 | 6

Second round
(Sweden) P Lundgren | 3 | 6^{5}
(Sweden) N Kulti | 6 | 7^{7}
(Germany) C Saceanu | 6 | 2 | 6
(Peru) P Arraya | 1 | 6 | 4
8 | (Sweden) M Larsson | 6 | 6
(Sweden) D Engel | 4 | 4
(Germany) P Baur | 7^{7} | 6
2 | (Sweden) C Bergström | 6^{5} | 2

Quarterfinals
(Sweden) N Kulti | 6^{4} | 6^{3}
(Germany) C Saceanu | 7^{7} | 7^{7}
8 | (Sweden) M Larsson | 6 | 6^{6} | 6
(Germany) P Baur | 4 | 7^{8} | 1

Semifinals
(Germany) C Saceanu | 7^{9} | 6^{3} | 4
8 | (Sweden) M Larsson | 6^{7} | 7^{7} | 6
