= 1995 French Open – Men's doubles =

Men's doubles
- 1995 French Open

Final
- Champion: (Netherlands) Jacco Eltingh (Netherlands) Paul Haarhuis
- Runner-up: (Sweden) Nicklas Kulti (Sweden) Magnus Larsson
- Score: 6–7^{(3–7)}, 6–4, 6–1

Details
- Draw: 64
- Seeds: 16

Events
Singles	men	women		boys	girls
Doubles	men	women	mixed	boys	girls
WC Singles	men	women	quad
WC Doubles	men	women	quad
Legends	−45	45+	women
← 1994 ·	French Open	· 1996 →

The 1995 French Open was a tennis tournament that took place on the outdoor clay courts at the Stade Roland Garros in Paris, France. The tournament was held from 29 May until 11 June. It was the 94th staging of the French Open, and the second Grand Slam tennis event of 1995.

== Seeds ==
Champion seeds are indicated in bold text while text in italics indicates the round in which those seeds were eliminated.

1. (Australia) Todd Woodbridge / (Australia) Mark Woodforde (first round)
2. (Netherlands) **Jacco Eltingh** / (Netherlands) **Paul Haarhuis (champions)**
3. (Canada) Grant Connell / (United States) Patrick Galbraith (second round)
4. (Zimbabwe) Byron Black / (United States) Jonathan Stark (second round)
5. (Sweden) Jan Apell / (Sweden) Jonas Björkman (second round)
6. (United States) Jim Grabb / (United States) Patrick McEnroe (quarterfinals)
7. (Russia) Yevgeny Kafelnikov / (Russia) Andrei Olhovskiy (quarterfinals)
8. (Czech Republic) Cyril Suk / (Czech Republic) Daniel Vacek (second round)
9. (United States) Jared Palmer / (United States) Richey Reneberg (second round)
10. (Spain) Sergio Casal / (Spain) Emilio Sánchez (second round)
11. (United States) Trevor Kronemann / (Australia) David Macpherson (first round)
12. (United States) Tommy Ho / (New Zealand) Brett Steven (semifinals)
13. (United States) Alex O'Brien / (Australia) Sandon Stolle (second round)
14. (South Africa) Lan Bale / (South Africa) John-Laffnie de Jager (first round)
15. (The Bahamas) Mark Knowles / (Netherlands) Jan Siemerink (third round)
16. (Argentina) Luis Lobo / (Spain) Javier Sánchez (first round)

== Draw ==
=== Key ===
- Q = Qualifier
- WC = Wild card
- LL = Lucky loser
- Alt = Alternate
- ITF = ITF entry
- PR = Protected ranking
- SR = Special ranking
- SE = Special exempt
- JE = Junior exempt
- JR = Junior Accelerator Programme entrant
- CO = College Accelerator Programme entrant
- NG = Next Gen Accelerator Program entrant
- w/o = Walkover
- r = Retired
- d = Defaulted

=== Finals ===
Quarterfinals
(Switzerland) Jakob Hlasek (United States) David Wheaton	6	6
(France) Arnaud Boetsch (Switzerland) Marc Rosset	1	3
(Sweden) Nicklas Kulti (Sweden) Magnus Larsson	6	6
6	(United States) Jim Grabb (United States) Patrick McEnroe	1	3
12	(United States) Tommy Ho (New Zealand) Brett Steven	6	6
(United States) Luke Jensen (United States) Murphy Jensen	3	1
7	(Russia) Yevgeny Kafelnikov (Russia) Andrei Olhovskiy	7	3	10
2	(Netherlands) Jacco Eltingh (Netherlands) Paul Haarhuis	6^{3}	6	12

Semifinals
(Switzerland) Jakob Hlasek (United States) David Wheaton	6	4	4
(Sweden) Nicklas Kulti (Sweden) Magnus Larsson	3	6	6
12	(United States) Tommy Ho (New Zealand) Brett Steven	3	0
2	(Netherlands) Jacco Eltingh (Netherlands) Paul Haarhuis	6	6

Final
(Sweden) Nicklas Kulti (Sweden) Magnus Larsson	7	4	1
2	(Netherlands) Jacco Eltingh (Netherlands) Paul Haarhuis	6^{3}	6	6

=== Top half ===
==== Section 1 ====
First round
(Italy) C Brandi (Belgium) L Pimek	6	4	6
1	(Australia) T Woodbridge (Australia) M Woodforde	1	6	4
(United States) D Johnson (United States) K Thorne	6	3	6
(Germany) M-K Goellner (Italy) D Nargiso	4	6	3
(United Kingdom) N Broad (South Africa) B Haygarth	6	6
(Czech Republic) M Damm (Czech Republic) J Kodeš Jr.	2	2
(Switzerland) J Hlasek (United States) D Wheaton	6	6^{5}	7
16	(Argentina) L Lobo (Spain) J Sánchez	3	7	5
9	(United States) J Palmer (United States) R Reneberg	6	6
(South Africa) P Norval (Netherlands) M Oosting	3	4
(France) A Boetsch (Switzerland) M Rosset	6	6
(United States) K Flach (United States) R Seguso	4	3
(United States) R Leach (United States) S Melville	6	6
(France) O Delaître (Australia) P Rafter	2	3
8	(Czech Republic) C Suk (Czech Republic) D Vacek	6	6^{4}	6
(Australia) W Arthurs (Netherlands) S Noteboom	3	7	3

Second round
(Italy) C Brandi (Belgium) L Pimek	4	4
(United States) D Johnson (United States) K Thorne	6	6
(United Kingdom) N Broad (South Africa) B Haygarth	4	6^{3}
(Switzerland) J Hlasek (United States) D Wheaton	6	7
9	(United States) J Palmer (United States) R Reneberg	6	5	15
(France) A Boetsch (Switzerland) M Rosset	3	7	17
(United States) R Leach (United States) S Melville	3	6	10
8	(Czech Republic) C Suk (Czech Republic) D Vacek	6	4	8

Third round
(United States) D Johnson (United States) K Thorne	6	6^{3}	6
(Switzerland) J Hlasek (United States) D Wheaton	4	7	8
(France) A Boetsch (Switzerland) M Rosset	6^{3}	7	8
(United States) R Leach (United States) S Melville	7	5	6

Quarterfinals
(Switzerland) J Hlasek (United States) D Wheaton	6	6
(France) A Boetsch (Switzerland) M Rosset	1	3

==== Section 2 ====
First round
4	(Zimbabwe) B Black (United States) J Stark	6	6
(Argentina) P Arnold (Argentina) D Orsanic	3	4
(Sweden) N Kulti (Sweden) M Larsson	6	6
(Argentina) J Frana (United States) K Kinnear	4	0
(Australia) J Eagle (Australia) A Florent	6	6
(United States) D Flach (United States) B Shelton	3	0
13	(United States) A O'Brien (Australia) S Stolle	6	6
(Sweden) O Kristiansson (Sweden) L-A Wahlgren	4	3
(Spain) J Arrese (Spain) J-A Conde	3	6	6
11	(United States) T Kronemann (Australia) D Macpherson	6	1	2
(Czech Republic) K Nováček (Sweden) M Wilander	2	6	14
(Spain) T Carbonell (Spain) F Roig	6	3	12
(United States) K Jones (United States) D Pate	7	5	6
(Germany) M Sinner (Netherlands) J Winnink	5	7	4
6	(United States) J Grabb (United States) P McEnroe	6	6
(France) R Gilbert (France) G Raoux	2	3

Second round
4	(Zimbabwe) B Black (United States) J Stark	4	6	11
(Sweden) N Kulti (Sweden) M Larsson	6	4	13
(Australia) J Eagle (Australia) A Florent	7	4	7
13	(United States) A O'Brien (Australia) S Stolle	6^{4}	6	5
(Spain) J Arrese (Spain) J-A Conde	4	3
(Czech Republic) K Nováček (Sweden) M Wilander	6	6
(United States) K Jones (United States) D Pate	4	3
6	(United States) J Grabb (United States) P McEnroe	6	6

Third round
(Sweden) N Kulti (Sweden) M Larsson	6	6
(Australia) J Eagle (Australia) A Florent	1	2
(Czech Republic) K Nováček (Sweden) M Wilander	4	4
6	(United States) J Grabb (United States) P McEnroe	6	6

Quarterfinals
(Sweden) N Kulti (Sweden) M Larsson	6	6
6	(United States) J Grabb (United States) P McEnroe	1	3

=== Bottom half ===
==== Section 3 ====
First round
5	(Sweden) J Apell (Sweden) J Björkman	6	6
(France) J-F Bachelot (France) M Huard	2	1
(Canada) S Lareau (United States) B MacPhie	6	7
(South Africa) D Adams (Netherlands) T Nijssen	3	6^{3}
(South Africa) M Barnard (South Africa) E Ferreira	6	3	6
(United States) D Randall (United States) G Van Emburgh	2	6	3
12	(United States) T Ho (New Zealand) B Steven	6	6
(Germany) A Mronz (Germany) U Riglewski	1	2
(Germany) D Prinosil (Czech Republic) D Rikl	6	6
14	(South Africa) L Bale (South Africa) J-L de Jager	3	4
(Australia) J Fitzgerald (Sweden) A Järryd	6	7
(United States) M Lucena (Portugal) N Marques	3	6^{1}
(United States) L Jensen (United States) M Jensen	6	7
(France) J Golmard (France) L Roux	2	6^{5}
3	(Canada) G Connell (United States) P Galbraith	4	6	6
(United States) M Keil (Sweden) P Nyborg	6	3	4

Second round
5	(Sweden) J Apell (Sweden) J Björkman	2	5
5	(Canada) S Lareau (United States) B MacPhie	6	7
(South Africa) M Barnard (South Africa) E Ferreira	3	2
12	(United States) T Ho (New Zealand) B Steven	6	6
(Germany) D Prinosil (Czech Republic) D Rikl	4	1
(Australia) J Fitzgerald (Sweden) A Järryd	6	6
(United States) L Jensen (United States) M Jensen	7	4	6
3	(Canada) G Connell (United States) P Galbraith	6^{8}	6	4

Third round
(Canada) S Lareau (United States) B MacPhie	2	2
12	(United States) T Ho (New Zealand) B Steven	6	6
(Australia) J Fitzgerald (Sweden) A Järryd	6^{6}	5
(United States) L Jensen (United States) M Jensen	7	7

Quarterfinals
12	(United States) T Ho (New Zealand) B Steven	6	6
(United States) L Jensen (United States) M Jensen	3	1

==== Section 4 ====
First round
7	(Russia) Y Kafelnikov (Russia) A Olhovskiy	5	6	6
(France) L Barthez (France) T Guardiola	7	2	3
(United States) M Bauer (Australia) J Ireland	6^{5}	6	6
(Portugal) E Couto (Portugal) J Cunha e Silva	7	2	4
(France) G Forget (France) F Santoro	6	4	6
(Argentina) P Albano (Netherlands) HJ Davids	3	6	3
10	(Spain) S Casal (Spain) E Sánchez	6	1	6
(France) J-P Fleurian (France) S Simian	3	6	1
15	(The Bahamas) M Knowles (Netherlands) J Siemerink	6	6
(Netherlands) T Kempers (United States) J Waite	3	3
(South Africa) G Muller (South Africa) D Visser	6	4	6
(United Kingdom) M Petchey (Sweden) M Tillström	4	6	2
(United States) S Davis (United States) J Tarango	7	6
(Czech Republic) V Flégl (Czech Republic) P Korda	6^{4}	4
2	(Netherlands) J Eltingh (Netherlands) P Haarhuis	6	6
(France) D Courcol (France) G Solvès	3	3

Second round
7	(Russia) Y Kafelnikov (Russia) A Olhovskiy	6	6
(United States) M Bauer (Australia) J Ireland	4	4
(France) G Forget (France) F Santoro	3	6	6
10	(Spain) S Casal (Spain) E Sánchez	6	3	3
15	(The Bahamas) M Knowles (Netherlands) J Siemerink	5	7	6
(South Africa) G Muller (South Africa) D Visser	7	6^{4}	4
(United States) S Davis (United States) J Tarango	2	4
2	(Netherlands) J Eltingh (Netherlands) P Haarhuis	6	6

Third round
7	(Russia) Y Kafelnikov (Russia) A Olhovskiy	7	7
(France) G Forget (France) F Santoro	6^{4}	6^{3}
15	(The Bahamas) M Knowles (Netherlands) J Siemerink	6	3	2
2	(Netherlands) J Eltingh (Netherlands) P Haarhuis	4	6	6

Quarterfinals
7	(Russia) Y Kafelnikov (Russia) A Olhovskiy	7	3	10
2	(Netherlands) J Eltingh (Netherlands) P Haarhuis	6^{3}	6	12
