= 1992 Copenhagen Open =

- Date: 2–8 March
- Edition: 4th
- Category: World Series
- Draw: 32S / 16D
- Prize money: $130,000
- Surface: Carpet / indoor
- Location: Copenhagen, Denmark

Champions

Singles
- (Sweden) Magnus Larsson

Doubles
- (Sweden) Nicklas Kulti / (Sweden) Magnus Larsson
← 1991 ·	Copenhagen Open	· 1993 →

The 1992 Copenhagen Open was a men's tennis tournament played on indoor carpet courts in Copenhagen, Denmark that was part of the World Series of the 1992 ATP Tour. It was the sixth edition of the tournament and was held from 2 March through 8 March 1992. Eighth-seeded Magnus Larsson won the singles title.

== Finals ==
=== Singles ===
(Sweden) Magnus Larsson defeated (Sweden) Anders Järryd, 6–4, 7–6^{(7–5)}

- It was Larsson's 1st singles title of the year and the 2nd of his career.

=== Doubles ===
(Sweden) Nicklas Kulti / (Sweden) Magnus Larsson defeated (Netherlands) Hendrik Jan Davids / (Belgium) Libor Pimek, 6–3, 6–4
