= 1994 Copenhagen Open =

- Date: 28 February – 7 March
- Edition: 6th
- Category: World Series
- Draw: 32S / 16D
- Prize money: $188,750
- Surface: Carpet / indoor
- Location: Copenhagen, Denmark

Champions

Singles
- (Russia) Yevgeny Kafelnikov

Doubles
- (Czech Republic) Martin Damm / (New Zealand) Brett Steven
← 1993 ·	Copenhagen Open	· 1995 →

The 1994 Copenhagen Open was a men's tennis tournament played on indoor carpet courts in Copenhagen, Denmark that was part of the World Series of the 1994 ATP Tour. It was the sixth edition of the tournament and was held from 28 February through 7 March 1994. Fourth-seeded Yevgeny Kafelnikov won the singles title.

== Finals ==
=== Singles ===
(Russia) Yevgeny Kafelnikov defeated (Czech Republic) Daniel Vacek, 6–3, 7–5.

- It was Kafelnikov's 2nd singles title of the year and of his career.

=== Doubles ===
(Czech Republic) Martin Damm / (New Zealand) Brett Steven defeated (Germany) David Prinosil / (Germany) Udo Riglewski, 6–3, 6–4.
