= 1995 South African Open (tennis) =

- Date: 3–9 April
- Edition: 90th
- Category: World Series
- Draw: 32S / 16D
- Prize money: $303,000
- Surface: Hard / outdoor
- Location: Johannesburg, South Africa

Champions

Singles
- (Germany) Martin Sinner

Doubles
- (France) Rodolphe Gilbert / (France) Guillaume Raoux
- South African Open

The 1995 South African Open was a men's tennis tournament played on hard courts. It was the 90th edition of the South African Open (and the last to take place until 2009), and was part of the ATP World Series of the 1995 ATP Tour. It took place in Johannesburg, South Africa from 3 April through 9 April 1995. Martin Sinner won the singles title.

== Finals ==
=== Singles ===
(Germany) Martin Sinner defeated (France) Guillaume Raoux, 6–1, 6–4

- It was Sinner's second singles title of the year and of his career.

=== Doubles ===
(France) Rodolphe Gilbert / (France) Guillaume Raoux defeated (Germany) Martin Sinner / (Netherlands) Joost Winnink, 6–4, 3–6, 6–3
