= ATP Osaka =

Defunct tennis tournament
- Event name: Salem Open
- Tour: ATP Tour
- Founded: 1993
- Abolished: 1994
- Editions: 2
- Location: Osaka, Japan
- Venue: Esaka Tennis Center
- Surface: Hard / outdoor

The ATP Osaka (a.k.a. Salem Open) was a men's tennis tournament played in Osaka, Japan. The event was played as part of the ATP Tour in 1993 and 1994. It was played on outdoor hard courts at the Esaka Tennis Center.

== Finals ==
=== Singles ===
| Year | Champions | Runners-up | Score |
|---|---|---|---|
| 1993 | (United States) Michael Chang | (Israel) Amos Mansdorf | 6–4, 6–4 |
| 1994 | (United States) Pete Sampras | (France) Lionel Roux | 6–2, 6–2 |

=== Doubles ===
| Year | Champions | Runners-up | Score |
|---|---|---|---|
| 1993 | (United States) Mark Keil (South Africa) Christo van Rensburg | (Canada) Glenn Michibata (United States) David Pate | 7–6, 6–3 |
| 1994 | (Czech Republic) Martin Damm (Australia) Sandon Stolle | (South Africa) David Adams (Russia) Andrei Olhovskiy | 6–4, 6–4 |
