= Martin Sinner =

German tennis player

- Country (sports): West Germany; Germany
- Born: 7 February 1968 (age 58) Koblenz, West Germany
- Height: 1.80 m (5 ft 11 in)
- Turned pro: 1988
- Plays: Right-handed (one-handed backhand)
- Prize money: $896,974

Singles
- Career record: 50–78
- Career titles: 2; 5 Challenger, 0 Futures
- Highest ranking: No. 42 (15 May 1995)

Grand Slam singles results
- Australian Open: 2R (1996)
- French Open: 1R (1995, 1998)
- Wimbledon: 1R (1995, 1997, 1998)
- US Open: 1R (1995)

Doubles
- Career record: 16–30
- Career titles: 0; 8 Challenger, 0 Futures
- Highest ranking: No. 82 (22 May 1989)

Grand Slam doubles results
- Australian Open: 2R (1996)
- French Open: 1R (1995)
- Wimbledon: 1R (1995)
- Last updated on: 9 July 2022.

Martin Sinner (born 7 February 1968) is a professional tennis player from Germany. He achieved a career-high singles ranking of world No. 42 in 1995.

Sinner played professional tennis for 15 years and earned $896,974. Currently he is a coach in tennis club SV Böblingen (Germany).

== ATP career finals ==
=== Singles: 2 (2 titles) ===
Legend Grand Slam tournaments (0–0) ATP Masters 1000 Series (0–0) ATP 500 Series (0–0) ATP 250 Series (2–0)	Finals by surface Hard (1–0) Clay (0–0) Grass (0–0) Carpet (1–0)	Finals by setting Outdoors (1–0) Indoors (1–0)

Result	W–L	Date	Tournament	Tier	Surface	Opponent	Score
Win	1–0	Mar 1995	Copenhagen, Denmark	World Series	Carpet (i)	(Russia) Andrei Olhovskiy	6–7^{(3–7)}, 7–6^{(10–8)}, 6–3
Win	2–0	Apr 1995	Johannesburg, South Africa	World Series	Hard	(France) Guillaume Raoux	6–1, 6–4

=== Doubles: 1 (runner-up) ===
Legend Grand Slam tournaments (0–0) ATP Masters 1000 Series (0–0) ATP 500 Series (0–0) ATP 250 Series (0–1)	Finals by surface Hard (0–1) Clay (0–0) Grass (0–0) Carpet (0–0)	Finals by setting Outdoors (0–1) Indoors (0–0)

Result	W–L	Date	Tournament	Tier	Surface	Partner	Opponents	Score
Loss	0–1	Apr 1995	Johannesburg Open, South Africa	World Series	Hard	(Netherlands) Joost Winnink	(France) Rodolphe Gilbert (France) Guillaume Raoux	4–6, 6–3, 3–6

== ATP Challenger and ITF Futures finals ==
=== Singles: 10 (5–5) ===
Legend ATP Challenger (5–5) ITF Futures (0–0)	Finals by surface Hard (1–1) Clay (3–2) Grass (0–0) Carpet (1–2)

Result	W–L	Date	Tournament	Tier	Surface	Opponent	Score
Win	1–0	Apr 1990	Pretoria, South Africa	Challenger	Hard	(South Africa) Wayne Ferreira	6–4, 6–4
Win	2–0	Jul 1990	Hanko, Finland	Challenger	Clay	(Soviet Union) Andrei Olhovskiy	6–3, 6–3
Loss	2–1	Jun 1991	Salzburg, Austria	Challenger	Clay	(Germany) Markus Rackl	6–1, 3–6, 4–6
Loss	2–2	Jul 1992	Oberstaufen, Germany	Challenger	Clay	(Italy) Massimo Valeri	3–6, 3–6
Loss	2–3	May 1994	Sliema, Malta	Challenger	Hard	(Netherlands) Hendrik-Jan Davids	4–6, 6–7
Win	3–3	Jun 1994	Sofia, Bulgaria	Challenger	Clay	(Peru) Alejandro Aramburú Acuna	6–2, 7–5
Win	4–3	Jul 1994	Montauban, France	Challenger	Clay	(France) Pier Gauthier	7–6, 6–2
Loss	4–4	Feb 1995	Wolfsburg, Germany	Challenger	Carpet (i)	(Germany) David Prinosil	4–6, 6–7
Loss	4–5	Mar 1995	Hamburg, Germany	Challenger	Carpet (i)	(Germany) David Prinosil	1–6, 4–6
Win	5–5	Feb 1998	Heilbronn, Germany	Challenger	Carpet (i)	(Italy) Gianluca Pozzi	6–0, 3–6, 6–3

=== Doubles: 13 (8–5) ===
Legend ATP Challenger (8–5) ITF Futures (0–0)	Finals by surface Hard (1–0) Clay (2–3) Grass (0–0) Carpet (5–2)

Result	W–L	Date	Tournament	Tier	Surface	Partner	Opponents	Score
Win	1–0	Mar 1988	Furth, Germany	Challenger	Carpet (i)	(Germany) Michael Stich	(Poland) Wojciech Kowalski (Romania) Adrian Marcu	4–6, 6–3, 7–6
Win	2–0	Mar 1989	Heilbronn, Germany	Challenger	Carpet (i)	(Germany) Michael Stich	(Romania) Gheorghe Cosac (Romania) Adrian Marcu	4–6, 6–4, 7–6
Win	3–0	May 1989	Salzburg, Austria	Challenger	Clay	(Germany) Michael Stich	(Australia) Brett Custer (Australia) Simon Youl	walkover
Loss	3–1	Feb 1990	Telford, United Kingdom	Challenger	Carpet (i)	(Australia) Russell Barlow	(United Kingdom) Nick Brown (United Kingdom) Nicholas Fulwood	4–6, 5–7
Loss	3–2	Jul 1990	Turin, Italy	Challenger	Clay	(Sweden) Christer Allgardh	(Australia) Neil Borwick (New Zealand) Nicholas Fulwood	2–6, 6–3, 2–6
Loss	3–3	Jun 1991	Salzburg, Austria	Challenger	Clay	(New Zealand) Bruce Derlin	(Sweden) Johan Carlsson (Sweden) David Engel	6–7, 2–6
Win	4–3	May 1994	Bombay, India	Challenger	Hard	(Germany) Martin Zumpft	(Germany) Sascha Nensel (Germany) Torben Theine	6–1, 6–4
Win	5–3	Jul 1994	Montauban, France	Challenger	Clay	(Netherlands) Joost Winnink	(Italy) Nicola Bruno (Brazil) Otavio Della	7–5, 6–3
Loss	5–4	Jun 1995	Heilbronn, Germany	Challenger	Carpet (i)	(Netherlands) Joost Winnink	(Croatia) Saša Hiršzon (Croatia) Goran Ivanišević	4–6, 4–6
Win	6–4	Feb 1995	Wolfsburg, Germany	Challenger	Carpet (i)	(Netherlands) Joost Winnink	(Germany) Dirk Dier (Germany) Lars Koslowski	7–5, 6–3
Win	7–4	Mar 1995	Hamburg, Germany	Challenger	Carpet (i)	(Germany) David Prinosil	(South Africa) Clinton Ferreira (North Macedonia) Aleksandar Kitinov	6–2, 6–3
Loss	7–5	Jul 1997	Furth, Germany	Challenger	Clay	(Netherlands) Joost Winnink	(United States) Brandon Coupe (South Africa) Paul Rosner	5–7, 3–6
Win	8–5	Feb 2000	Wolfsburg, Germany	Challenger	Carpet (i)	(Germany) Jan-Ralph Brandt	(Czech Republic) Tomáš Cibulec (Czech Republic) Leoš Friedl	7–5, 3–6, 7–6^{(9–7)}

== Performance timelines ==
Key
W	F	SF	QF	#R	RR	Q#	DNQ	A	NH

(W) winner; (F) finalist; (SF) semifinalist; (QF) quarterfinalist; (#R) rounds 4, 3, 2, 1; (RR) round-robin stage; (Q#) qualification round; (DNQ) did not qualify; (A) absent; (NH) not held; (SR) strike rate (events won / competed); (W–L) win–loss record.

=== Singles ===
Tournament	1989	1990	1991	1992	1993	1994	1995	1996	1997	1998	1999	2000	SR	W–L	Win %
Grand Slam tournaments
Australian Open	Q3	A	1R	A	A	A	A	2R	Q3	A	A	A	0 / 2	1–2	33%
French Open	A	A	A	A	A	A	1R	A	A	1R	A	A	0 / 2	0–2	0%
Wimbledon	A	A	A	A	A	Q1	1R	A	1R	1R	A	A	0 / 3	0–3	0%
US Open	A	A	A	A	A	A	1R	Q3	A	A	A	A	0 / 1	0–1	0%
Win–loss	0–0	0–0	0–1	0–0	0–0	0–0	0–3	1–1	0–1	0–2	0–0	0–0	0 / 8	1–8	11%
ATP Masters Series
Indian Wells	A	A	A	A	A	Q3	A	A	A	A	A	A	0 / 0	0–0	–
Miami	A	A	A	A	A	Q2	A	A	A	A	A	A	0 / 0	0–0	–
Monte Carlo	A	A	A	A	A	Q1	A	A	A	Q1	A	A	0 / 0	0–0	–
Hamburg	A	A	A	A	A	A	1R	A	Q2	1R	A	Q1	0 / 2	0–2	0%
Rome	A	A	A	A	A	A	1R	A	Q2	Q1	A	A	0 / 1	0–1	0%
Paris	A	A	A	A	A	A	1R	A	Q1	A	A	A	0 / 1	0–1	0%
Win–loss	0–0	0–0	0–0	0–0	0–0	0–0	0–3	0–0	0–0	0–1	0–0	0–0	0 / 4	0–4	0%
