= David Adams (tennis) =

South African tennis player

- Country (sports): South Africa
- Born: 5 January 1970 (age 56) Durban, South Africa
- Height: 1.88 m (6 ft 2 in)
- Turned pro: 1989
- Plays: Right-handed
- Prize money: $2,534,247

Singles
- Career record: 9–21
- Career titles: 0
- Highest ranking: No. 131 (24 October 1994)

Grand Slam singles results
- Australian Open: 1R (1996)

Doubles
- Career record: 246–258
- Career titles: 19
- Highest ranking: No. 9 (21 February 1994)

Grand Slam doubles results
- Australian Open: 3R (1994, 1999, 2001, 2002)
- French Open: F (1992)
- Wimbledon: SF (2000)
- US Open: SF (1993)

Grand Slam mixed doubles results
- Australian Open: W (1999)
- French Open: W (2000)

Team competitions
- Davis Cup: 4–2

David Dixie Adams (born 5 January 1970) is a former tennis player from South Africa. He turned professional in 1989. In his career, he won 19 doubles titles and finished runner-up an additional 33 times, including at the French Open in 1992. He achieved a career-high doubles ranking of world No. 9 in February 1994.

Adams participated in six Davis Cup ties for South Africa between 1997 and 2003, posting a 4–2 record, all in doubles.

Adams won two Grand Slam titles in mixed doubles, both with fellow South African Mariaan de Swardt, taking the Australian Open title in 1999 and the French Open title in 2000.

== Grand Slam finals ==
=== Mixed doubles: 2 (2 titles) ===
Result	Year	Championship	Surface	Partner	Opponents	Score
Win	1999	Australian Open	Hard	(South Africa) Mariaan de Swardt	(Belarus) Max Mirnyi (United States) Serena Williams	6–4, 4–6, 7–6^{(7–5)}
Win	2000	French Open	Clay	(South Africa) Mariaan de Swardt	(Australia) Todd Woodbridge (Australia) Rennae Stubbs	6–3, 3–6, 6–3

== Career finals ==
=== Doubles: 52 (19 titles, 33 runner-ups) ===
Result	W/L	Date	Tournament	Surface	Partner	Opponents	Score
Win	1.	May 1992	Munich, Germany	Clay	(Netherlands) Menno Oosting	(Australia) Carl Limberger (Czechoslovakia) Tomáš Anzari	3–6, 7–5, 6–3
Loss	1.	Jun 1992	French Open, Paris	Clay	(Russia) Andrei Olhovskiy	(Switzerland) Jakob Hlasek (Switzerland) Marc Rosset	6–7, 7–6, 5–7
Loss	2.	Nov 1992	Moscow, Russia	Carpet (i)	(Russia) Andrei Olhovskiy	(South Africa) Marius Barnard (South Africa) John-Laffnie de Jager	4–6, 6–3, 6–7
Loss	3.	Feb 1993	Rotterdam, Netherlands	Carpet (i)	(Russia) Andrei Olhovskiy	(Sweden) Henrik Holm (Sweden) Anders Järryd	4–6, 6–7
Win	2.	Mar 1993	Copenhagen, Denmark	Carpet (i)	(Russia) Andrei Olhovskiy	(Czech Republic) Martin Damm (Czech Republic) Daniel Vacek	6–3, 3–6, 6–3
Win	3.	Apr 1993	Estoril, Portugal	Clay	(Russia) Andrei Olhovskiy	(Netherlands) Menno Oosting (Germany) Udo Riglewski	6–3, 7–5
Loss	4.	Jun 1993	Rosmalen, Netherlands	Grass	(Russia) Andrei Olhovskiy	(United States) Patrick McEnroe (United States) Jonathan Stark	6–7, 6–1, 4–6
Loss	5.	Sep 1993	Bordeaux, France	Hard	(Russia) Andrei Olhovskiy	(Argentina) Pablo Albano (Argentina) Javier Frana	6–7, 6–4, 3–6
Loss	6.	Oct 1993	Bolzano, Italy	Carpet (i)	(Russia) Andrei Olhovskiy	(Netherlands) Hendrik Jan Davids (South Africa) Piet Norval	3–6, 2–6
Loss	7.	Jan 1994	Adelaide, Australia	Hard	(Zimbabwe) Byron Black	(Australia) Andrew Kratzmann (Australia) Mark Kratzmann	4–6, 3–6
Win	4.	Feb 1994	Stuttgart Indoor, Germany	Carpet (i)	(Russia) Andrei Olhovskiy	(Canada) Grant Connell (United States) Patrick Galbraith	6–7, 6–4, 7–6
Win	5.	Mar 1994	Casablanca, Morocco	Clay	(Netherlands) Menno Oosting	(Italy) Cristian Brandi (Italy) Federico Mordegan	6–3, 6–4
Loss	8.	Apr 1994	Osaka, Japan	Hard	(Russia) Andrei Olhovskiy	(Czech Republic) Martin Damm (Australia) Sandon Stolle	4–6, 4–6
Loss	9.	Aug 1994	Hilversum, Netherlands	Clay	(Russia) Andrei Olhovskiy	(Argentina) Daniel Orsanic (Netherlands) Jan Siemerink	4–6, 2–6
Win	6.	Aug 1994	Kitzbühel, Austria	Clay	(Russia) Andrei Olhovskiy	(Spain) Sergio Casal (Spain) Emilio Sánchez	6–7, 6–3, 7–5
Loss	10.	Oct 1994	Beijing, China	Carpet (i)	(Russia) Andrei Olhovskiy	(United States) Tommy Ho (United States) Kent Kinnear	6–7, 3–6
Loss	11.	Nov 1994	Moscow, Russia	Carpet (i)	(Russia) Andrei Olhovskiy	(Netherlands) Jacco Eltingh (Netherlands) Paul Haarhuis	w/o
Win	7.	Jan 1995	Jakarta, Indonesia	Hard	(Russia) Andrei Olhovskiy	(Haiti) Ronald Agénor (Japan) Shuzo Matsuoka	7–5, 6–3
Win	8.	Feb 1995	Marseille, France	Carpet (i)	(Russia) Andrei Olhovskiy	(France) Jean-Philippe Fleurian (France) Rodolphe Gilbert	6–1, 6–4
Win	9.	Mar 1996	Rotterdam, Netherlands	Carpet (i)	(South Africa) Marius Barnard	(Netherlands) Hendrik Jan Davids (Czech Republic) Cyril Suk	6–3, 5–7, 7–6
Loss	12.	May 1996	Sankt Pölten, Austria	Clay	(Netherlands) Menno Oosting	(Czech Republic) Ctislav Doseděl (Czech Republic) Pavel Vízner	7–6, 4–6, 3–6
Loss	13.	Jul 1996	Kitzbühel, Austria	Clay	(Netherlands) Menno Oosting	(Czech Republic) Libor Pimek (South Africa) Byron Talbot	6–7, 3–6
Loss	14.	Sep 1996	Bucharest, Romania	Clay	(Netherlands) Menno Oosting	(Sweden) David Ekerot (United States) Jeff Tarango	6–7, 6–7
Loss	15.	Sep 1996	Basel, Switzerland	Hard (i)	(Netherlands) Menno Oosting	(Russia) Yevgeny Kafelnikov (Czech Republic) Daniel Vacek	3–6, 4–6
Win	10.	Feb 1997	Antwerp, Belgium	Hard (i)	(France) Olivier Delaître	(Australia) Sandon Stolle (Czech Republic) Cyril Suk	3–6, 6–2, 6–1
Loss	16.	Mar 1997	Milan, Italy	Carpet (i)	(Russia) Andrei Olhovskiy	(Argentina) Pablo Albano (Sweden) Peter Nyborg	4–6, 6–7
Loss	17.	Jun 1997	Halle, Germany	Grass	(South Africa) Marius Barnard	(Germany) Karsten Braasch (Germany) Michael Stich	6–7, 3–6
Loss	18.	Nov 1997	Moscow, Russia	Carpet (i)	(France) Fabrice Santoro	(Czech Republic) Martin Damm (Czech Republic) Cyril Suk	4–6, 3–6
Loss	19.	May 1998	Hamburg, Germany	Clay	(New Zealand) Brett Steven	(United States) Donald Johnson (United States) Francisco Montana	2–6, 5–7
Loss	20.	May 1998	Sankt Pölten, Austria	Clay	(Zimbabwe) Wayne Black	(United States) Jim Grabb (Australia) David Macpherson	4–6, 4–6
Loss	21.	Oct 1998	Vienna, Austria	Carpet (i)	(South Africa) John-Laffnie de Jager	(Russia) Yevgeny Kafelnikov (Czech Republic) Daniel Vacek	5–7, 3–6
Loss	22.	Oct 1998	Ostrava, Czech Republic	Carpet (i)	(Czech Republic) Pavel Vízner	(Germany) Nicolas Kiefer (Germany) David Prinosil	4–6, 3–6
Loss	23.	Feb 1999	Marseille, France	Hard (i)	(Czech Republic) Pavel Vízner	(Belarus) Max Mirnyi (Russia) Andrei Olhovskiy	5–7, 6–7^{(7–9)}
Loss	24.	Feb 1999	Dubai, UAE	Hard	(South Africa) John-Laffnie de Jager	(Zimbabwe) Wayne Black (Australia) Sandon Stolle	6–4, 1–6, 4–6
Win	11.	Feb 1999	Rotterdam, Netherlands	Carpet (i)	(South Africa) John-Laffnie de Jager	(United Kingdom) Neil Broad (Australia) Peter Tramacchi	6–7, 6–3, 6–4
Loss	25.	May 1999	Rome, Italy	Clay	(South Africa) John-Laffnie de Jager	(South Africa) Ellis Ferreira (United States) Rick Leach	7–6, 1–6, 2–6
Win	12.	Jul 1999	Båstad, Sweden	Clay	(United States) Jeff Tarango	(Sweden) Nicklas Kulti (Sweden) Mikael Tillström	7–6^{(8–6)}, 6–4
Loss	26.	Aug 1999	Washington, D.C., U.S.	Hard	(South Africa) John-Laffnie de Jager	(United States) Justin Gimelstob (Canada) Sébastien Lareau	5–7, 7–6^{(7–2)}, 3–6
Win	13.	Sep 1999	Bournemouth, England	Clay	(United States) Jeff Tarango	(Germany) Michael Kohlmann (Sweden) Nicklas Kulti	6–3, 6–7^{(5–7)}, 7–6^{(7–5)}
Loss	27.	Oct 1999	Toulouse, France	Hard (i)	(South Africa) John-Laffnie de Jager	(France) Olivier Delaître (United States) Jeff Tarango	6–3, 6–7^{(2–7)}, 4–6
Loss	28.	Oct 1999	Stuttgart Indoor, Germany	Hard (i)	(South Africa) John-Laffnie de Jager	(Sweden) Jonas Björkman (Zimbabwe) Byron Black	7–6^{(8–6)}, 6–7^{(2–7)}, 0–6
Win	14.	Feb 2000	Rotterdam, Netherlands	Hard (i)	(South Africa) John-Laffnie de Jager	(United Kingdom) Tim Henman (Russia) Yevgeny Kafelnikov	5–7, 6–2, 6–3
Win	15.	Feb 2000	London, England	Hard (i)	(South Africa) John-Laffnie de Jager	(United States) Jan-Michael Gambill (United States) Scott Humphries	6–3, 6–7^{(7–9)}, 7–6^{(13–11)}
Loss	29.	Apr 2000	Estoril, Portugal	Clay	(Australia) Joshua Eagle	(United States) Donald Johnson (South Africa) Piet Norval	4–6, 5–7
Win	16.	May 2000	Munich, Germany	Clay	(South Africa) John-Laffnie de Jager	(Belarus) Max Mirnyi (Federal Republic of Yugoslavia) Nenad Zimonjić	6–4, 6–4
Loss	30.	Jan 2001	Auckland, New Zealand	Hard	(Argentina) Martín García	(South Africa) Marius Barnard (United States) Jim Thomas	6–7^{(10–12)}, 4–6
Loss	31.	Mar 2001	Acapulco, Mexico	Clay	(Argentina) Martín García	(United States) Donald Johnson (Brazil) Gustavo Kuerten	3–6, 6–7^{(5–7)}
Loss	32.	Mar 2002	Delray Beach, U.S.	Hard	(Australia) Ben Ellwood	(Czech Republic) Martin Damm (Czech Republic) Cyril Suk	4–6, 7–6^{(7–5)}, [5–10]
Loss	33.	Jul 2002	Stuttgart Outdoor, Germany	Clay	(Argentina) Gastón Etlis	(Australia) Joshua Eagle (Czech Republic) David Rikl	3–6, 4–6
Win	17.	Sep 2002	Tashkent, Uzbekistan	Hard	(South Africa) Robbie Koenig	(Netherlands) Raemon Sluiter (Netherlands) Martin Verkerk	6–2, 7–5
Win	18.	Oct 2002	St. Petersburg, Russia	Hard (i)	(United States) Jared Palmer	(Georgia (country)) Irakli Labadze (Russia) Marat Safin	7–6^{(10–8)}, 6–3
Win	19.	Jan 2003	Auckland, New Zealand	Hard	(South Africa) Robbie Koenig	(Czech Republic) Tomáš Cibulec (Czech Republic) Leoš Friedl	7–6^{(7–5)}, 3–6, 6–3

== Doubles performance timeline ==
Key
W	F	SF	QF	#R	RR	Q#	DNQ	A	NH

(W) winner; (F) finalist; (SF) semifinalist; (QF) quarterfinalist; (#R) rounds 4, 3, 2, 1; (RR) round-robin stage; (Q#) qualification round; (DNQ) did not qualify; (A) absent; (NH) not held; (SR) strike rate (events won / competed); (W–L) win–loss record.

Tournament	1987	1988	1989	1990	1991	1992	1993	1994	1995	1996	1997	1998	1999	2000	2001	2002	2003	Career SR	Career win–loss
Grand Slam tournaments
Australian Open	A	A	A	2R	A	2R	1R	3R	2R	1R	1R	2R	3R	2R	3R	3R	2R	0 / 13	14–13
French Open	A	A	A	A	A	F	2R	SF	1R	2R	1R	1R	1R	1R	1R	2R	1R	0 / 12	12–12
Wimbledon	A	A	A	A	2R	1R	2R	1R	1R	1R	1R	1R	3R	SF	3R	2R	2R	0 / 13	12–12
US Open	A	A	A	A	1R	1R	SF	QF	1R	3R	QF	3R	2R	1R	1R	1R	1R	0 / 13	15–13
Grand Slam SR	0 / 0	0 / 0	0 / 0	0 / 1	0 / 2	0 / 4	0 / 4	0 / 4	0 / 4	0 / 4	0 / 4	0 / 4	0 / 4	0 / 4	0 / 4	0 / 4	0 / 4	0 / 51	N/A
Annual win–loss	0–0	0–0	0–0	1–1	1–2	6–4	6–3	9–4	1–4	3–4	3–4	3–4	5–4	5–4	4–4	4–4	2–4	N/A	53–50
ATP Masters Series
Indian Wells	NME			A	A	A	A	A	A	A	A	2R	1R	QF	1R	1R	1R	0 / 6	3–6
Miami	NME			A	A	A	3R	A	3R	A	A	QF	2R	3R	3R	2R	1R	0 / 8	8–8
Monte Carlo	NME			A	A	A	SF	A	A	1R	1R	2R	1R	2R	QF	1R	1R	0 / 9	6–9
Rome	NME			A	A	QF	1R	1R	A	1R	QF	1R	F	1R	1R	1R	2R	0 / 11	9–11
Hamburg	NME			A	A	2R	2R	QF	A	1R	2R	F	2R	1R	2R	QF	1R	0 / 11	11–11
Canada	NME			A	A	A	A	A	2R	1R	1R	1R	SF	QF	SF	1R	A	0 / 8	9–8
Cincinnati	NME			A	A	2R	1R	A	1R	A	1R	1R	QF	1R	1R	2R	1R	0 / 10	4–10
Madrid (Stuttgart)	NME			A	A	1R	2R	2R	A	1R	2R	1R	F	2R	2R	QF	A	0 / 10	7–10
Paris	NME			A	A	1R	QF	QF	QF	QF	2R	1R	2R	QF	2R	2R	A	0 / 11	12–11
Masters Series SR	N/A			0 / 0	0 / 0	0 / 5	0 / 7	0 / 4	0 / 4	0 / 6	0 / 7	0 / 9	0 / 9	0 / 9	0 / 9	0 / 9	0 / 6	0 / 84	N/A
Annual win–loss	N/A			0–0	0–0	4–5	5–7	2–4	4–4	2–6	5–7	9–9	14–9	7–9	9–9	7–9	1–6	N/A	69–84
Year-end ranking	824	434	289	180	101	26	20	13	71	35	25	37	12	19	33	27	91	N/A	
