= Peter Nyborg =

Swedish tennis player

- Country (sports): Sweden
- Residence: Trollhättan, Sweden
- Born: 12 December 1969 (age 55); Gothenburg, Sweden
- Height: 1.91 m (6 ft 3 in)
- Turned pro: 1988
- Plays: Right-handed
- Prize money: $898,987

Singles
- Career record: 3–11
- Career titles: 0
- Highest ranking: No. 166 (24 April 1989)

Doubles
- Career record: 148–208
- Career titles: 5
- Highest ranking: No. 38 (12 Aug 1996)

Grand Slam doubles results
- Australian Open: 3R (2000)
- French Open: 3R (1998)
- Wimbledon: 2R (1991, 1992, 2000)
- US Open: 3R (1998, 1999, 2000)

Mixed doubles

Grand Slam mixed doubles results
- Australian Open: 1R (1996, 1997, 1998, 2000)
- French Open: 2R (1999)
- Wimbledon: 2R (1996, 1997)

Peter Nyborg (born 12 December 1969), is a Swedish former professional tennis player. He enjoyed most of his tennis success while playing doubles. During his career he won 5 doubles titles. He achieved a career-high doubles ranking of world No. 38 in 1996. He currently works for racket sport platform MATCHi.

== Career finals ==
=== Doubles (5 titles, 6 runner-ups) ===
| Result | W-L | Date | Tournament | Surface | Partner | Opponents | Score |
|---|---|---|---|---|---|---|---|
| Win | 1–0 | Apr 1993 | Seoul, South Korea | Hard | (Sweden) Jan Apell | (United Kingdom) Neil Broad (South Africa) Gary Muller | 5–7, 7–6, 6–2 |
| Loss | 1–1 | Jun 1994 | Rosmalen, Netherlands | Grass | (Italy) Diego Nargiso | (Netherlands) Stephen Noteboom (Netherlands) Fernon Wibier | 3–6, 6–1, 6–7 |
| Win | 2–1 | Mar 1995 | Copenhagen, Denmark | Carpet | (United States) Mark Keil | (France) Guillaume Raoux (Canada) Greg Rusedski | 6–7, 6–4, 7–6 |
| Loss | 2–2 | Sep 1995 | Basel, Switzerland | Hard (i) | (United States) Mark Keil | (Czech Republic) Cyril Suk (Czech Republic) Daniel Vacek | 6–3, 3–6, 3–6 |
| Loss | 2–3 | Feb 1996 | Marseille, France | Hard | (South Africa) Marius Barnard | (France) Jean-Philippe Fleurian (France) Guillaume Raoux | 3–6, 2–6 |
| Loss | 2–4 | Mar 1996 | St. Petersburg, Russia | Carpet | (Sweden) Nicklas Kulti | (Russia) Yevgeny Kafelnikov (Russia) Andrei Olhovskiy | 3–6, 4–6 |
| Loss | 2–5 | Jul 1996 | Båstad, Sweden | Clay | (Australia) Joshua Eagle | (Sweden) David Ekerot (United States) Jeff Tarango | 4–6, 6–3, 4–6 |
| Win | 3–5 | Feb 1997 | Milan, Italy | Carpet | (Argentina) Pablo Albano | (South Africa) David Adams (Russia) Andrei Olhovskiy | 6–4, 7–6 |
| Loss | 3–6 | Nov 1998 | Stockholm, Sweden | Hard (i) | (South Africa) Chris Haggard | (Sweden) Nicklas Kulti (Sweden) Mikael Tillström | 5–7, 6–3, 5–7 |
| Win | 4–6 | Jul 1999 | Kitzbühel, Austria | Clay | (South Africa) Chris Haggard | (Spain) Álex Calatrava (Serbia) Dušan Vemić | 6–3, 6–7, 7–6 |
| Win | 5–6 | Sep 2002 | Bucharest, Romania | Clay | (Germany) Jens Knippschild | (Spain) Emilio Benfele Álvarez (Argentina) Andrés Schneiter | 6–3, 6–3 |
