= Morten Christensen (tennis) =

Danish tennis player

- Country (sports): Denmark
- Residence: Gentofte, Denmark
- Born: 15 June 1965 (age 59); Copenhagen, Denmark
- Height: 1.91 m (6 ft 3 in)
- Plays: Right-handed
- Prize money: $46,884

Singles
- Career record: 7–18
- Career titles: 0
- Highest ranking: No. 250 (18 Apr 1988)

Other tournaments
- Olympic Games: 1R (1988)

Doubles
- Career record: 15–20
- Career titles: 0
- Highest ranking: No. 104 (25 Aug 1986)

Grand Slam doubles results
- French Open: 1R (1987)
- US Open: 1R (1986)

Other doubles tournaments
- Olympic Games: QF (1988)

Morten Christensen (born 15 June 1965) is a former tennis player from Denmark.

Christensen represented his native country at the 1988 Summer Olympics in Seoul, South Korea. There he was defeated in the first round by the number fifteen seed from Yugoslavia, Slobodan Živojinović. The right-hander reached his highest singles ATP-ranking on 18 April 1988, when he rose to the rank of World No. 250.

== See also ==
- List of Denmark Davis Cup team representatives
