= Andrei Olhovskiy =

Russian tennis player

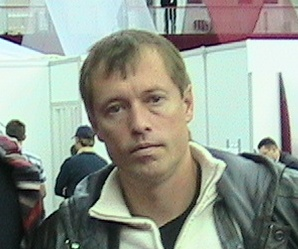
- Country (sports): Soviet Union; Russia
- Born: 15 April 1966 (age 60) Moscow, USSR
- Height: 1.85 m (6 ft 1 in)
- Turned pro: 1987
- Retired: 2002
- Plays: Right-handed (two-handed backhand)
- Prize money: $3,208,620

Singles
- Career record: 117–165
- Career titles: 2
- Highest ranking: No. 49 (14 June 1993)

Grand Slam singles results
- Australian Open: 3R (1993, 1995)
- French Open: 2R (1994)
- Wimbledon: 4R (1988, 1992)
- US Open: 2R (1989, 1994, 1996)

Other tournaments
- Olympic Games: QF (1996)

Doubles
- Career record: 379–314
- Career titles: 20
- Highest ranking: No. 6 (31 July 1995)

Grand Slam doubles results
- Australian Open: SF (1996)
- French Open: F (1992)
- Wimbledon: QF (1995)
- US Open: SF (1993, 1999)

Grand Slam mixed doubles results
- Australian Open: W (1994)
- French Open: W (1993)
- Wimbledon: F (1997)
- US Open: QF (1997)
Medal record
Representing Soviet Union
Summer Universiade – Tennis
Silver medal – second place	1987 Zagreb	Doubles
Silver medal – second place	1987 Zagreb	Mixed doubles

Andrei Stanislavovich Olhovskiy (Russian: Андре́й Станисла́вович Ольхо́вский; pronounced [ɐnˈdrʲej ɐlʲˈxofskʲɪj]; born 15 April 1966) is a former tennis player from Russia, who turned professional in 1989.

== Career ==
Olhovskiy represented the Soviet Union at the 1988 Summer Olympics in Seoul and Russia at the 1996 Summer Olympics in Atlanta, where he reached the quarterfinals as a wild card before falling to Brazil's Fernando Meligeni.

The right-hander won two career titles in singles (Copenhagen, 1993 and Shanghai, 1996) and 20 titles in doubles, French Open (1993) and Australian Open (1994) champion in mixed doubles. Olhovskiy reached his highest ATP singles ranking on 14 June 1993, when he became world No. 49, and his highest doubles ranking of No. 6 (31 July 1995). He played for the Russia Davis Cup team from 1983 to 2001. He defeated No. 1 seed Jim Courier in the third round of Wimbledon in 1992.

== Grand Slam finals ==
=== Doubles (1 runner-up) ===
Result	Year	Championship	Surface	Partner	Opponents	Score
Loss	1992	French Open	Clay	(South Africa) David Adams	(Switzerland) Jakob Hlasek (Switzerland) Marc Rosset	6–7, 7–6, 5–7

=== Mixed doubles (2 titles, 2 runner-ups) ===
Result	Year	Championship	Surface	Partner	Opponents	Score
Win	1993	French Open	Clay	(Russia) Eugenia Maniokova	(South Africa) Elna Reinach (South Africa) Danie Visser	6–2, 4–6, 6–4
Win	1994	Australian Open	Hard	(Latvia) Larisa Neiland	(Czech Republic) Helena Suková (Australia) Todd Woodbridge	7–5, 6–7^{(0)}, 6–2
Loss	1994	French Open (2)	Clay	(Latvia) Larisa Neiland	(Netherlands) Kristie Boogert (Netherlands) Menno Oosting	5–7, 6–3, 5–7
Loss	1997	Wimbledon	Grass	(Latvia) Larisa Neiland	(Czech Republic) Helena Suková (Czechoslovakia) Cyril Suk	6–4, 3–6, 4–6

== Career finals ==
=== Singles: 4 (2 wins / 2 losses) ===
Result	W-L	Date	Tournament	Surface	Opponent	Score
Win	1–0	Mar 1993	Copenhagen, Denmark	Carpet (i)	(Sweden) Nicklas Kulti	7–5, 3–6, 6–2
Loss	1–1	Sep 1994	Kuala Lumpur, Malaysia	Carpet (i)	(Netherlands) Jacco Eltingh	6–7^{(1–7)}, 6–2, 4–6
Loss	1–2	Mar 1995	Copenhagen, Denmark	Carpet (i)	(Germany) Martin Sinner	7–6^{(7–3)}, 6–7^{(8–10)}, 3–6
Win	2–2	Jan 1996	Shanghai, China	Carpet (i)	(The Bahamas) Mark Knowles	7–6^{(7–5)}, 6–2

=== Doubles: 40 (20 wins / 20 losses) ===
Legend Grand Slam (0–1) ATP Masters Series (1–1) ATP Championship Series (1–1) ATP Tour (18–17)	Finals by surface Hard (5–5) Clay (5–5) Grass (0–3) Carpet (10–7)

Result	W-L	Date	Tournament	Surface	Partner	Opponents	Score
Loss	0–1	May 1990	Umag, Yugoslavia	Clay	(Soviet Union) Andrei Cherkasov	(Czechoslovakia) Vojtěch Flégl (Czechoslovakia) Daniel Vacek	4–6, 4–6
Loss	0–2	Mar 1991	Copenhagen, Denmark	Carpet	(Iran) Mansour Bahrami	(Australia) Todd Woodbridge (Australia) Mark Woodforde	3–6, 1–6
Loss	0–3	Apr 1992	Tampa, United States	Clay	(Brazil) Luiz Mattar	(United States) Mike Briggs (United States) Trevor Kronemann	6–7, 7–6, 4–6
Loss	0–4	Jun 1992	French Open, Paris	Clay	(South Africa) David Adams	(Switzerland) Jakob Hlasek (Switzerland) Marc Rosset	6–7, 7–6, 5–7
Loss	0–5	Nov 1992	Moscow, Russia	Carpet (i)	(South Africa) David Adams	(South Africa) Marius Barnard (South Africa) John-Laffnie de Jager	4–6, 6–3, 6–7
Loss	0–6	Mar 1993	Rotterdam, Netherlands	Carpet (i)	(South Africa) David Adams	(Sweden) Henrik Holm (Sweden) Anders Järryd	4–6, 6–7
Win	1–6	Mar 1993	Copenhagen, Denmark	Carpet (i)	(South Africa) David Adams	(Czech Republic) Martin Damm (Czech Republic) Daniel Vacek	6–3, 3–6, 6–3
Win	2–6	Apr 1993	Estoril, Portugal	Clay	(South Africa) David Adams	(Netherlands) Menno Oosting (Germany) Udo Riglewski	6–3, 7–5
Loss	2–7	Jun 1993	Rosmalen, Netherlands	Grass	(South Africa) David Adams	(United States) Patrick McEnroe (United States) Jonathan Stark	6–7, 6–1, 4–6
Win	3–7	Aug 1993	Schenectady, United States	Hard	(Germany) Bernd Karbacher	(Zimbabwe) Byron Black (New Zealand) Brett Steven	2–6, 7–6, 6–1
Loss	3–8	Sep 1993	Bordeaux, France	Hard (i)	(South Africa) David Adams	(Argentina) Pablo Albano (Argentina) Javier Frana	6–7, 6–4, 3–6
Loss	3–9	Oct 1993	Bolzano, Italy	Hard	(South Africa) David Adams	(Netherlands) Hendrik Jan Davids (South Africa) Piet Norval	3–6, 2–6
Win	4–9	Feb 1994	Stuttgart Indoor, Germany	Carpet (i)	(South Africa) David Adams	(Canada) Grant Connell (United States) Patrick Galbraith	6–7, 6–4, 7–6
Loss	4–10	Apr 1994	Osaka, Japan	Hard	(South Africa) David Adams	(Czech Republic) Martin Damm (Australia) Sandon Stolle	4–6, 4–6
Loss	4–11	Aug 1994	Hilversum, Netherlands	Clay	(South Africa) David Adams	(Argentina) Daniel Orsanic (Netherlands) Jan Siemerink	4–6, 2–6
Win	5–11	Aug 1994	Kitzbühel, Austria	Clay	(South Africa) David Adams	(Spain) Sergio Casal (Spain) Emilio Sánchez	6–7, 6–3, 7–5
Loss	5–12	Oct 1994	Beijing, China	Carpet (i)	(South Africa) David Adams	(United States) Tommy Ho (United States) Kent Kinnear	6–7, 3–6
Loss	5–13	Nov 1994	Moscow, Russia	Carpet (i)	(South Africa) David Adams	(Netherlands) Jacco Eltingh (Netherlands) Paul Haarhuis	w/o
Loss	5–14	Jan 1995	Doha, Qatar	Hard	(Netherlands) Jan Siemerink	(Sweden) Stefan Edberg (Sweden) Magnus Larsson	6–7, 2–6
Win	6–14	Jan 1995	Jakarta, Indonesia	Hard	(South Africa) David Adams	(Haiti) Ronald Agénor (Japan) Shuzo Matsuoka	7–5, 6–3
Win	7–14	Feb 1995	Marseille, France	Carpet (i)	(South Africa) David Adams	(France) Jean-Philippe Fleurian (France) Rodolphe Gilbert	6–1, 6–4
Win	8–14	Apr 1995	Estoril, Portugal	Clay	(Russia) Yevgeny Kafelnikov	(Germany) Marc-Kevin Goellner (Italy) Diego Nargiso	5–7, 7–5, 6–2
Loss	8–15	May 1995	Hamburg, Germany	Clay	(Zimbabwe) Byron Black	(South Africa) Wayne Ferreira (Russia) Yevgeny Kafelnikov	1–6, 6–7
Loss	8–16	Jun 1995	Rosmalen, Netherlands	Grass	(Netherlands) Hendrik Jan Davids	(Netherlands) Richard Krajicek (Netherlands) Jan Siemerink	5–7, 3–6
Loss	8–17	Jun 1995	Halle, Germany	Grass	(Russia) Yevgeny Kafelnikov	(Netherlands) Jacco Eltingh (Netherlands) Paul Haarhuis	2–6, 6–3, 3–6
Win	9–17	Jul 1995	Montreal, Canada	Hard	(Russia) Yevgeny Kafelnikov	(United States) Brian MacPhie (Australia) Sandon Stolle	6–2, 6–2
Win	10–17	Apr 1996	St. Petersburg, Russia	Carpet (i)	(Russia) Yevgeny Kafelnikov	(Sweden) Nicklas Kulti (Sweden) Peter Nyborg	6–3, 6–4
Win	11–17	Apr 1996	Hong Kong	Hard	(United States) Patrick Galbraith	(United States) Kent Kinnear (United States) Dave Randall	6–3, 6–7, 7–6
Loss	11–18	Oct 1996	Singapore	Carpet (i)	(Czech Republic) Martin Damm	(Australia) Todd Woodbridge (Australia) Mark Woodforde	6–7, 6–7
Win	12–18	Oct 1996	Beijing, China	Carpet (i)	(Czech Republic) Martin Damm	(Germany) Patrik Kühnen (South Africa) Gary Muller	6–4, 7–5
Win	13–18	Nov 1996	Moscow, Russia	Carpet (i)	(United States) Rick Leach	(Czech Republic) Jiří Novák (Czech Republic) David Rikl	4–6, 6–1, 6–2
Loss	13–19	Mar 1997	Milan, Italy	Carpet (i)	(South Africa) David Adams	(Argentina) Pablo Albano (Sweden) Peter Nyborg	4–6, 6–7
Win	14–19	Mar 1997	Copenhagen, Denmark	Carpet (i)	(New Zealand) Brett Steven	(Denmark) Kenneth Carlsen (Denmark) Frederik Fetterlein	6–4, 6–2
Win	15–19	Mar 1997	St. Petersburg, Russia	Carpet (i)	(New Zealand) Brett Steven	(Germany) David Prinosil (Czech Republic) Daniel Vacek	6–4, 6–3
Win	16–19	Feb 1999	Marseille, France	Hard (i)	(Belarus) Max Mirnyi	(South Africa) David Adams (Czech Republic) Pavel Vízner	7–5, 7–6
Win	17–19	Mar 1999	Copenhagen, Denmark	Carpet (i)	(Belarus) Max Mirnyi	(Germany) Marc-Kevin Goellner (Germany) David Prinosil	6–7^{(5–7)}, 7–6^{(7–4)}, 6–1
Win	18–19	May 1999	St. Pölten, Austria	Clay	(Australia) Andrew Florent	(South Africa) Brent Haygarth (South Africa) Robbie Koenig	5–7, 6–4, 7–5
Loss	18–20	Jan 2001	Doha, Qatar	Hard	(Spain) Juan Balcells	(The Bahamas) Mark Knowles (Canada) Daniel Nestor	3–6, 1–6
Win	19–20	Feb 2002	Milan, Italy	Carpet (i)	(Germany) Karsten Braasch	(France) Julien Boutter (Belarus) Max Mirnyi	3–6, 7–6^{(7–5)}, [12–10]
Win	20–20	Apr 2002	Estoril, Portugal	Clay	(Germany) Karsten Braasch	(Sweden) Simon Aspelin (Australia) Andrew Kratzmann	6–3, 6–3

== Doubles performance timeline ==
Key
W	F	SF	QF	#R	RR	Q#	DNQ	A	NH

(W) winner; (F) finalist; (SF) semifinalist; (QF) quarterfinalist; (#R) rounds 4, 3, 2, 1; (RR) round-robin stage; (Q#) qualification round; (DNQ) did not qualify; (A) absent; (NH) not held; (SR) strike rate (events won / competed); (W–L) win–loss record.

Tournament	1984	1985	1986	1987	1988	1989	1990	1991	1992	1993	1994	1995	1996	1997	1998	1999	2000	2001	2002	2003	2004	2005	Career SR	Career W–L
Grand Slam tournaments
Australian Open	A	A	A	A	A	A	A	A	1R	1R	3R	2R	SF	QF	A	3R	2R	A	1R	A	2R	A	0 / 10	14–10
French Open	A	A	A	A	A	A	A	1R	F	2R	SF	QF	2R	2R	2R	2R	A	2R	1R	2R	A	A	0 / 12	19–12
Wimbledon	A	A	A	A	2R	A	Q2	1R	1R	2R	1R	QF	3R	2R	1R	A	2R	2R	2R	1R	A	A	0 / 13	11–12
US Open	A	A	A	A	A	1R	A	1R	1R	SF	QF	2R	1R	3R	2R	SF	1R	1R	2R	1R	A	A	0 / 14	16–14
Grand Slam SR	0 / 0	0 / 0	0 / 0	0 / 0	0 / 1	0 / 1	0 / 0	0 / 3	0 / 4	0 / 4	0 / 4	0 / 4	0 / 4	0 / 4	0 / 3	0 / 3	0 / 3	0 / 3	0 / 4	0 / 3	0 / 1	0 / 0	0 / 49	N/A
Annual win–loss	0–0	0–0	0–0	0–0	1–1	0–1	0–0	0–3	5–4	6–3	9–4	8–4	7–4	7–4	2–3	7–3	2–3	2–3	2–4	1–3	1–1	0–0	N/A	60–48
ATP Masters Series
Indian Wells	These Tournaments Were Not Masters Series Events Before 1990						A	A	A	A	A	A	A	A	A	A	A	A	A	A	A	A	0 / 0	0–0
Miami	These Tournaments Were Not Masters Series Events Before 1990						A	A	A	3R	A	3R	A	A	1R	2R	A	1R	1R	A	A	A	0 / 6	3–6
Monte Carlo	These Tournaments Were Not Masters Series Events Before 1990						A	A	A	SF	A	1R	QF	1R	SF	1R	1R	2R	A	A	A	A	0 / 8	6–8
Rome	These Tournaments Were Not Masters Series Events Before 1990						A	A	QF	1R	1R	1R	SF	QF	2R	2R	1R	QF	1R	A	A	A	0 / 11	11–11
Hamburg	These Tournaments Were Not Masters Series Events Before 1990						A	A	A	2R	QF	F	SF	SF	1R	1R	1R	2R	1R	A	A	A	0 / 10	9–10
Canada	These Tournaments Were Not Masters Series Events Before 1990						A	A	A	A	A	W	1R	A	A	QF	2R	A	A	A	A	A	1 / 4	6–3
Cincinnati	These Tournaments Were Not Masters Series Events Before 1990						A	A	2R	1R	A	2R	2R	A	A	1R	1R	1R	A	A	A	A	0 / 7	2–7
Stuttgart (Stockholm)	These Tournaments Were Not Masters Series Events Before 1990						A	A	1R	2R	2R	A	1R	1R	A	SF	A	A	A	A	A	A	0 / 6	2–6
Paris	These Tournaments Were Not Masters Series Events Before 1990						A	A	1R	QF	QF	A	1R	A	A	2R	A	A	A	A	A	A	0 / 5	4–5
Masters Series SR	N/A						0 / 0	0 / 0	0 / 4	0 / 7	0 / 4	1 / 6	0 / 7	0 / 4	0 / 4	0 / 8	0 / 5	0 / 5	0 / 3	0 / 0	0 / 0	0 / 0	1 / 57	N/A
Annual win–loss	N/A						0–0	0–0	3–4	5–7	2–4	7–5	7–7	4–4	3–4	7–8	1–5	4–5	0–3	0–0	0–0	0–0	N/A	43–56
Year-end ranking	758	361	370	465	160	250	135	95	32	18	14	12	19	29	71	22	92	51	48	263	475	967	N/A	
