= Magnus Larsson =

Swedish tennis player (born 1970)

- Country (sports): Sweden
- Residence: Monte Carlo, Monaco
- Born: 25 March 1970 (age 56) Olofström, Sweden
- Height: 1.93 m (6 ft 4 in)
- Turned pro: 1989
- Retired: 2004
- Plays: Right-handed (two-handed backhand)
- Coach: Stefan Simonsson; Carl-Axel Hageskog
- Prize money: US$5,839,451

Singles
- Career record: 310–221
- Career titles: 7
- Highest ranking: No. 10 (17 April 1995)

Grand Slam singles results
- Australian Open: 4R (1995)
- French Open: SF (1994)
- Wimbledon: 4R (1998)
- US Open: QF (1993, 1997, 1998)

Other tournaments
- Grand Slam Cup: W (1994)
- Olympic Games: 3R (1992)

Doubles
- Career record: 69–66
- Career titles: 6
- Highest ranking: No. 26 (9 January 1995)

Grand Slam doubles results
- Australian Open: 1R (1990, 1995, 1996)
- French Open: F (1995)
- Wimbledon: 2R (1994, 1996)
- US Open: SF (1994)

Team competitions
- Davis Cup: W (1994, 1997)
- Last updated on: 16 December 2021.

Per Henrik Magnus Larsson (Swedish pronunciation: [ˈmǎŋnɵs ˈlɑ̌ːʂɔn]; born 25 March 1970) is a former professional tennis player from Sweden.

== Playing career ==
Larsson turned professional in 1989 and won his first top-level singles title at Florence in 1990. His first doubles title was also won in Florence, in 1991.

Some of the most significant highlights of Larsson's career came in 1994. He won that year's Grand Slam Cup, defeating World No. 1 Pete Sampras in the final in four sets 7–6, 4–6, 7–6, 6–4. Larsson also reached the semi-finals of the 1994 French Open, and was part of the Swedish team which won the 1994 Davis Cup. He won singles rubbers in the Davis Cup final in Moscow in December against both Yevgeny Kafelnikov and Alexander Volkov, as Sweden defeated Russia, 4–1.

In 1995, Larsson reached his career-high singles ranking of World No. 10 and his career-high doubles ranking of World No. 26. He was runner-up in the men's doubles at the French Open that year (partnering Nicklas Kulti). He was also part of the Swedish team which won the World Team Cup.

Larsson played in the final of the Davis Cup again in 1997. And again he won both his singles rubbers – against Pete Sampras and Michael Chang – and was on the winning team as Sweden thrashed the United States 5–0.

Larsson won a total of seven singles and six doubles titles during his career. His last doubles title was won in 1998 in Båstad. His final singles title came in 2000 at the Regions Morgan Keegan Championships in Memphis. He retired from the professional tour in 2003. He has since played in the senior Outback Champions Series, winning the Stanford Championships in 2006.

== Junior Grand Slam finals ==
=== Singles: 1 (1 runner-up) ===
Result	Year	Tournament	Surface	Opponent	Score
Loss	1988	French Open	Clay	(Venezuela) Nicolás Pereira	6–7, 3–6

== ATP career finals ==
=== Singles: 15 (7 titles, 8 runner-ups) ===
Legend Grand Slam Tournaments (0–0) ATP World Tour Finals (1–0) ATP World Tour Masters Series (0–0) ATP Championship Series (1–1) ATP World Series (7–7)	Finals by surface Hard (2–3) Clay (2–2) Grass (0–2) Carpet (3–1)	Finals by setting Outdoors (2–5) Indoors (5–3)

Result	W–L	Date	Tournament	Tier	Surface	Opponent	Score
Win	1–0	Jun 1990	Florence, Italy	World Series	Clay	(United States) Lawson Duncan	6–7, 7–5, 6–0
Loss	1–1	Jul 1990	Båstad, Sweden	World Series	Clay	(Australia) Richard Fromberg	2–6, 6–7^{(5–7)}
Win	2–1	Mar 1992	Copenhagen, Denmark	World Series	Carpet	(Sweden) Anders Järryd	6–4, 7–6^{(7–5)}
Win	3–1	May 1992	Munich, Germany	World Series	Clay	(Czechoslovakia) Petr Korda	6–4, 4–6, 6–1
Win	4–1	Mar 1994	Zaragoza, Spain	World Series	Carpet	(Germany) Lars Rehmann	6–4, 6–4
Loss	4–2	Jun 1994	Halle, Germany	World Series	Grass	(Germany) Michael Stich	4–6, 6–4, 3–6
Win	5–2	Oct 1994	Toulouse, France	World Series	Hard	(United States) Jared Palmer	6–1, 6–3
Loss	5–3	Nov 1994	Antwerp, Belgium	World Series	Carpet	(United States) Pete Sampras	6–7^{(5–7)}, 4–6
Win	6–3	Dec 1994	Munich, Germany	Grand Slam Cup	Carpet	(United States) Pete Sampras	7–6^{(8–6)}, 4–6, 7–6^{(7–5)}, 6–4
Loss	6–4	Jan 1995	Doha, Qatar	World Series	Hard	(Sweden) Stefan Edberg	6–7^{(4–7)}, 1–6
Loss	6–5	Apr 1995	Barcelona, Spain	Championship Series	Clay	(Austria) Thomas Muster	2–6, 1–6, 4–6
Loss	6–6	Oct 1996	Toulouse, France	World Series	Hard	(Australia) Mark Philippoussis	1–6, 7–5, 4–6
Loss	6–7	Jun 1998	Halle, Germany	International Series	Grass	(Russia) Yevgeny Kafelnikov	4–6, 4–6
Win	7–7	Feb 2000	Memphis, United States	Championship Series	Hard	(Zimbabwe) Byron Black	6–2, 1–6, 6–3
Loss	7–8	Mar 2000	Copenhagen, Denmark	International Series	Hard	(Sweden) Andreas Vinciguerra	3–6, 6–7^{(5–7)}

=== Doubles: 8 (6 titles, 2 runner-ups) ===
Legend Grand Slam Tournaments (0–1) ATP World Tour Finals (0–0) ATP Masters Series (1–0) ATP Championship Series (0–0) ATP World Series (5–1)	Finals by surface Hard (2–0) Clay (3–2) Grass (0–0) Carpet (1–0)	Finals by setting Outdoors (4–2) Indoors (2–0)

Result	W–L	Date	Tournament	Tier	Surface	Partner	Opponents	Score
Win	1–0	Jun 1991	Florence, Italy	World Series	Clay	(Sweden) Ola Jonsson	(Spain) Juan Carlos Báguena (Spain) Carlos Costa	3–6, 6–1, 6–1
Win	2–0	Mar 1992	Copenhagen, Denmark	World Series	Carpet	(Sweden) Nicklas Kulti	(Netherlands) Hendrik Jan Davids (Belgium) Libor Pimek	6–3, 6–4
Win	3–0	Apr 1994	Monte Carlo, Monaco	Masters Series	Clay	(Sweden) Nicklas Kulti	(Russia) Yevgeny Kafelnikov (Czech Republic) Daniel Vacek	3–6, 7–6, 6–4
Win	4–0	Jan 1995	Doha, Qatar	World Series	Hard	(Sweden) Stefan Edberg	(Russia) Andrei Olhovskiy (Netherlands) Jan Siemerink	7–6, 6–2
Loss	4–1	Jun 1995	Paris, France	Grand Slam	Clay	(Sweden) Nicklas Kulti	(Netherlands) Jacco Eltingh (Netherlands) Paul Haarhuis	7–6, 4–6, 1–6
Win	5–1	Feb 1997	Marseille, France	World Series	Hard	(Sweden) Thomas Enqvist	(France) Olivier Delaître (France) Fabrice Santoro	6–3, 6–4
Loss	5–2	May 1997	Båstad, Sweden	World Series	Clay	(Sweden) Magnus Gustafsson	(Sweden) Nicklas Kulti (Sweden) Mikael Tillström	0–6, 3–6
Win	6–2	Jul 1998	Båstad, Sweden	World Series	Clay	(Sweden) Magnus Gustafsson	(South Africa) Lan Bale (South Africa) Piet Norval	6–4, 6–2

== ATP Challenger and ITF Futures finals ==
=== Singles: 7 (4–3) ===
Legend ATP Challenger (4–3) ITF Futures (0–0)	Finals by surface Hard (0–0) Clay (3–3) Grass (0–0) Carpet (1–0)

Result	W–L	Date	Tournament	Tier	Surface	Opponent	Score
Loss	0–1	Aug 1989	Pescara, Italy	Challenger	Clay	(Italy) Massimo Cierro	3–6, 3–6
Win	1–1	Sep 1989	Genoa, Italy	Challenger	Clay	(New Zealand) Bruce Derlin	6–1, 6–3
Loss	1–2	Sep 1989	Messina, Italy	Challenger	Clay	(Switzerland) Marc Rosset	1–6, 1–6
Loss	1–3	Apr 1990	Parioli, Italy	Challenger	Clay	(Spain) Fernando Luna	3–6, 6–4, 4–6
Win	2–3	May 1990	Ljubljana, Slovenia	Challenger	Clay	(Italy) Diego Nargiso	7–5, 6–7, 7–6
Win	3–3	May 1992	Ljubljana, Slovenia	Challenger	Clay	(Sweden) Mikael Tillström	6–4, 6–4
Win	4–3	Jan 2000	Heilbronn, Germany	Challenger	Carpet	(France) Stephane Huet	6–3, 7–6^{(7–1)}

=== Doubles: 8 (5–3) ===
Legend ATP Challenger (5–3) ITF Futures (0–0)	Finals by surface Hard (0–0) Clay (3–1) Grass (0–0) Carpet (2–2)

Result	W–L	Date	Tournament	Tier	Surface	Partner	Opponents	Score
Loss	0–1	Aug 1989	Pescara, Italy	Challenger	Clay	(Sweden) Nicklas Kulti	(Sweden) Fredrik Nilsson (Sweden) David Engel	2–6, 6–4, 6–7
Win	1–1	Sep 1989	Messina, Italy	Challenger	Clay	(Sweden) Joakim Nyström	(Italy) Massimo Cierro (Italy) Alessandro de Minicis	6–1, 6–1
Win	2–1	Nov 1989	Copenhagen, Denmark	Challenger	Carpet	(Sweden) Nicklas Kulti	(Austria) Alex Antonitsch (Sweden) Ronnie Båthman	6–3, 6–2
Loss	2–2	Nov 1991	Aachen, Germany	Challenger	Carpet	(Sweden) Jan Gunnarsson	(United States) Mark Keil (South Africa) Byron Talbot	3–6, 6–3, 3–6
Win	3–2	May 1992	Ljubljana, Slovenia	Challenger	Clay	(Sweden) Mikael Tillström	(Italy) Cristian Brandi (Italy) Federico Mordegan	6–3, 6–2
Win	4–2	Apr 1994	Monte Carlo, Monaco	Challenger	Clay	(Sweden) Henrik Holm	(Italy) Cristian Brandi (Italy) Federico Mordegan	7–6, 6–2
Loss	4–3	Jan 2000	Heilbronn, Germany	Challenger	Carpet	(Sweden) Fredrik Lovén	(Netherlands) Jan Siemerink (Netherlands) John Van Lottum	5–7, 6–7^{(6–8)}
Win	5–3	Feb 2003	Hamburg, Germany	Challenger	Carpet	(North Macedonia) Aleksandar Kitinov	(Australia) Todd Perry (United States) Jim Thomas	4–6, 7–6^{(9–7)}, 7–6^{(12–10)}

== Performance timelines ==
Key
W	F	SF	QF	#R	RR	Q#	DNQ	A	NH

(W) winner; (F) finalist; (SF) semifinalist; (QF) quarterfinalist; (#R) rounds 4, 3, 2, 1; (RR) round-robin stage; (Q#) qualification round; (DNQ) did not qualify; (A) absent; (NH) not held; (SR) strike rate (events won / competed); (W–L) win–loss record.

=== Singles ===
Tournament	1989	1990	1991	1992	1993	1994	1995	1996	1997	1998	1999	2000	2001	2002	2003	SR	W–L	Win %
Grand Slam tournaments
Australian Open	1R	2R	1R	1R	2R	1R	4R	3R	2R	1R	A	A	A	A	1R	0 / 11	8–11	42%
French Open	A	A	3R	3R	3R	SF	4R	1R	3R	1R	2R	A	3R	Q2	A	0 / 10	19–10	66%
Wimbledon	A	1R	2R	3R	2R	1R	A	2R	A	4R	1R	A	3R	1R	A	0 / 10	10–10	50%
US Open	A	A	3R	2R	QF	1R	A	1R	QF	QF	3R	A	1R	Q3	A	0 / 9	17–9	65%
Win–loss	0–1	1–2	5–4	5–4	8–4	5–4	6–2	3–4	7–3	7–4	3–3	0–0	4–3	0–1	0–1	0 / 40	54–40	57%
National Representation
Summer Olympics	Not Held			3R	Not Held			A	Not Held			A	Not Held			0 / 1	2–1	67%
Year-end Championships
Grand Slam Cup	NH	Did not qualify			1R	W	Did not qualify					Not Held				1 / 2	4–1	80%
ATP Masters Series
Indian Wells	A	A	A	A	A	A	QF	1R	3R	1R	A	A	A	A	A	0 / 4	5–4	56%
Miami	A	A	A	A	2R	A	SF	2R	4R	2R	A	1R	A	Q1	Q1	0 / 6	7–6	54%
Monte Carlo	A	A	3R	3R	3R	1R	2R	1R	QF	A	A	1R	A	Q2	A	0 / 8	9–8	53%
Hamburg	A	A	2R	A	1R	2R	A	QF	1R	A	A	A	A	Q2	A	0 / 5	5–5	50%
Rome	A	A	1R	1R	1R	A	A	A	3R	A	A	A	A	Q1	A	0 / 4	2–4	33%
Canada	A	A	A	A	A	A	A	A	A	A	1R	A	A	A	A	0 / 1	0–1	0%
Cincinnati	A	A	A	A	A	A	A	2R	1R	SF	2R	A	Q2	A	A	0 / 4	6–4	60%
Stuttgart	A	A	A	A	A	A	A	A	QF	A	2R	A	A	A	A	0 / 2	4–2	67%
Paris	A	A	A	2R	2R	3R	3R	2R	1R	A	A	A	Q1	A	A	0 / 6	6–6	50%
Win–loss	0–0	0–0	3–3	3–3	3–5	3–3	8–4	5–6	13–8	4–3	2–3	0–2	0–0	0–0	0–0	0 / 40	44–40	52%

=== Doubles ===
Tournament	1990	1991	1992	1993	1994	1995	1996	1997	SR	W–L	Win %
Grand Slam tournaments
Australian Open	1R	A	A	A	A	1R	1R	A	0 / 3	0–3	0%
French Open	A	1R	A	A	2R	F	1R	A	0 / 4	6–4	60%
Wimbledon	A	A	A	A	2R	A	2R	A	0 / 2	2–2	50%
US Open	A	A	A	A	SF	A	A	A	0 / 1	4–1	80%
Win–loss	0–1	0–1	0–0	0–0	6–3	5–2	1–3	0–0	0 / 10	12–10	55%
ATP Masters Series
Indian Wells	A	A	A	A	A	2R	A	A	0 / 1	1–1	50%
Miami	A	A	A	A	A	2R	2R	A	0 / 2	1–2	33%
Monte Carlo	A	A	A	A	W	2R	A	Q2	1 / 2	5–1	83%
Hamburg	A	A	A	A	QF	A	A	A	0 / 1	2–1	67%
Stuttgart	A	A	A	A	A	A	A	Q2	0 / 0	0–0	–
Paris	A	A	A	A	2R	A	A	A	0 / 1	1–1	50%
Win–loss	0–0	0–0	0–0	0–0	8–2	1–3	1–1	0–0	1 / 7	10–6	63%
