= Daniel Vacek =

Czech tennis player (born 1971)

- Country (sports): Czechoslovakia; Czech Republic
- Residence: Sarnen, Switzerland
- Born: 1 April 1971 (age 55) Prague, Czechoslovakia (now Czech Republic)
- Height: 1.90 m (6 ft 3 in)
- Turned pro: 1990
- Retired: 2003
- Plays: Right-handed (one-handed backhand)
- Prize money: $4,803,388

Singles
- Career record: 176–225
- Career titles: 0
- Highest ranking: No. 26 (29 January 1996)

Grand Slam singles results
- Australian Open: 3R (1994)
- French Open: 3R (1994, 1998)
- Wimbledon: 4R (1994)
- US Open: 4R (1995, 1997)

Doubles
- Career record: 335–258
- Career titles: 25
- Highest ranking: No. 3 (8 September 1997)

Grand Slam doubles results
- Australian Open: QF (1999)
- French Open: W (1996, 1997)
- Wimbledon: 3R (1998)
- US Open: W (1997)

Daniel Vacek (born 1 April 1971) is a former tennis player from Czechoslovakia and the Czech Republic who turned professional in 1990. He reached the quarterfinals of the 1995 Paris Masters, the 1998 Canada Masters and the 1998 Cincinnati Masters, and achieved a career-high singles ranking of world No. 26 in January 1996.

Vacek represented his native country at the 1996 Summer Olympics in Atlanta where he was defeated in the second round. The right-hander won 25 career titles in doubles with various partners, including the French Open in 1996 and 1997, and the US Open in 1997 with Yevgeny Kafelnikov.

== ATP career finals ==
=== Singles: 5 (5 runner-ups) ===
Legend Grand Slam (0) Tennis Masters Cup (0) ATP Masters Series (0) ATP International Series Gold (0) ATP Tour (5)	Titles by surface Hard (0) Clay (0) Grass (0) Carpet (0)

Result	W-L	Date	Tournament	Surface	Opponent	Score
Loss	0–1	Mar 1994	Copenhagen, Denmark	Carpet (i)	(Russia) Yevgeny Kafelnikov	3–6, 5–7
Loss	0–2	Feb 1995	Marseille, France	Carpet (i)	(Germany) Boris Becker	7–6^{(7–2)}, 4–6, 5–7
Loss	0–3	Nov 1995	Moscow, Russia	Carpet (i)	(Germany) Carl-Uwe Steeb	6–7^{(5–7)}, 6–3, 6–7^{(6–8)}
Loss	0–4	Mar 1997	Rotterdam, Netherlands	Carpet (i)	(Netherlands) Richard Krajicek	6–7^{(4–7)}, 6–7^{(5–7)}
Loss	0–5	Sep 1999	Toulouse, France	Hard (i)	(France) Nicolas Escudé	5–7, 1–6

=== Doubles: 40 (25 titles / 15 runner-ups) ===
Legend Grand Slam (3) Tennis Masters Cup (0) ATP Masters Series (1) ATP International Series Gold (5) ATP Tour (16)	Titles by surface Hard (10) Clay (10) Grass (0) Carpet (5)

Result	W-L	Date	Tournament	Surface	Partner	Opponents	Score
Win	1–0	May 1990	Umag, Yugoslavia	Clay	(Czechoslovakia) Vojtěch Flégl	(Soviet Union) Andrei Cherkasov (Soviet Union) Andrei Olhovskiy	6–4, 6–4
Win	2–0	Aug 1990	Prague, Czechoslovakia	Clay	(Czechoslovakia) Vojtěch Flégl	(Romania) George Cosac (Romania) Florin Segărceanu	5–7, 6–4, 6–3
Win	3–0	Aug 1990	San Marino	Clay	(Czechoslovakia) Vojtěch Flégl	(Spain) Jordi Burillo (Spain) Marcos Aurelio Górriz	6–1, 4–6, 7–6
Loss	3–1	Aug 1991	Prague, Czechoslovakia	Clay	(Belgium) Libor Pimek	(Czechoslovakia) Vojtěch Flégl (Czechoslovakia) Cyril Suk	4–6, 2–6
Loss	3–2	Oct 1991	Berlin, Germany	Carpet (i)	(Netherlands) Jan Siemerink	(Czechoslovakia) Petr Korda (Czechoslovakia) Karel Nováček	6–3, 5–7, 5–7
Loss	3–3	Jan 1992	Wellington, New Zealand	Hard	(Netherlands) Michiel Schapers	(United States) Jared Palmer (United States) Jonathan Stark	3–6, 3–6
Loss	3–4	Mar 1993	Copenhagen, Denmark	Carpet (i)	(Czech Republic) Martin Damm	(South Africa) David Adams (Russia) Andrei Olhovskiy	3–6, 6–3, 3–6
Win	4–4	Aug 1993	New Haven, United States	Hard	(Czech Republic) Cyril Suk	(United States) Steve DeVries (Australia) David Macpherson	7–5, 6–4
Win	5–4	Feb 1994	Marseille, France	Carpet (i)	(Netherlands) Jan Siemerink	(Czech Republic) Martin Damm (Russia) Yevgeny Kafelnikov	6–7, 6–4, 6–1
Loss	5–5	Apr 1994	Monte Carlo, Monaco	Clay	(Russia) Yevgeny Kafelnikov	(Sweden) Nicklas Kulti (Sweden) Magnus Larsson	6–3, 6–7, 4–6
Loss	5–6	Jul 1994	Gstaad, Switzerland	Clay	(Netherlands) Menno Oosting	(Spain) Sergio Casal (Spain) Emilio Sánchez	6–7, 4–6
Win	6–6	Oct 1994	Toulouse, France	Hard (i)	(Netherlands) Menno Oosting	(United States) Patrick McEnroe (United States) Jared Palmer	7–6, 6–7, 6–3
Loss	6–7	Feb 1995	Stuttgart Indoor, Germany	Carpet (i)	(Czech Republic) Cyril Suk	(Canada) Grant Connell (United States) Patrick Galbraith	2–6, 2–6
Win	7–7	Apr 1995	Nice, France	Clay	(Czech Republic) Cyril Suk	(United States) Luke Jensen (United States) David Wheaton	3–6, 7–6, 7–6
Win	8–7	May 1995	Rome, Italy	Clay	(Czech Republic) Cyril Suk	(Sweden) Jan Apell (Sweden) Jonas Björkman	6–3, 6–4
Win	9–7	Aug 1995	Long Island, United States	Hard	(Czech Republic) Cyril Suk	(United States) Rick Leach (United States) Scott Melville	5–7, 7–6, 7–6
Loss	9–8	Sep 1995	Bucharest, Romania	Clay	(Czech Republic) Cyril Suk	(United States) Mark Keil (United States) Jeff Tarango	4–6, 6–7
Win	10–8	Oct 1995	Basel, Switzerland	Hard (i)	(Czech Republic) Cyril Suk	(United States) Mark Keil (Sweden) Peter Nyborg	3–6, 6–3, 6–3
Loss	10–9	Oct 1995	Essen, Germany	Carpet (i)	(Czech Republic) Cyril Suk	(Netherlands) Jacco Eltingh (Netherlands) Paul Haarhuis	5–7, 4–6
Win	11–9	May 1996	Prague, Czech Republic	Clay	(Russia) Yevgeny Kafelnikov	(Argentina) Luis Lobo (Spain) Javier Sánchez	6–3, 6–7, 6–3
Win	12–9	Jun 1996	French Open, Paris	Clay	(Russia) Yevgeny Kafelnikov	(Switzerland) Jakob Hlasek (France) Guy Forget	6–2, 6–3
Loss	12–10	Jun 1996	Halle, Germany	Grass	(Russia) Yevgeny Kafelnikov	(Zimbabwe) Byron Black (Canada) Grant Connell	1–6, 5–7
Win	13–10	Sep 1996	Basel, Switzerland	Hard (i)	(Russia) Yevgeny Kafelnikov	(South Africa) David Adams (Netherlands) Menno Oosting	6–3, 6–4
Win	14–10	Oct 1996	Vienna, Austria	Carpet (i)	(Russia) Yevgeny Kafelnikov	(Czech Republic) Pavel Vízner (Netherlands) Menno Oosting	7–6, 6–4
Loss	14–11	Nov 1996	Paris Masters, France	Carpet (i)	(Russia) Yevgeny Kafelnikov	(Netherlands) Jacco Eltingh (Netherlands) Paul Haarhuis	4–6, 6–4, 6–7
Loss	14–12	Mar 1997	St. Petersburg, Russia	Carpet (i)	(Germany) David Prinosil	(Russia) Andrei Olhovskiy (New Zealand) Brett Steven	4–6, 3–6
Win	15–12	Apr 1997	Hong Kong	Hard	(Czech Republic) Martin Damm	(Germany) Karsten Braasch (United States) Jeff Tarango	6–3, 6–4
Win	16–12	Apr 1997	Tokyo, Japan	Hard	(Czech Republic) Martin Damm	(United States) Justin Gimelstob (Australia) Patrick Rafter	2–6, 6–2, 7–6
Win	17–12	Jun 1997	French Open, Paris	Clay	(Russia) Yevgeny Kafelnikov	(Australia) Todd Woodbridge (Australia) Mark Woodforde	7–6^{(14–12)}, 4–6, 6–3
Win	18–12	Jul 1997	Gstaad, Switzerland	Clay	(Russia) Yevgeny Kafelnikov	(United States) Trevor Kronemann (Australia) David Macpherson	4–6, 7–6, 6–3
Win	19–12	Sep 1997	US Open, New York	Hard	(Russia) Yevgeny Kafelnikov	(Sweden) Jonas Björkman (Sweden) Nicklas Kulti	7–6, 6–3
Loss	19–13	Mar 1998	London, England	Carpet (i)	(Russia) Yevgeny Kafelnikov	(Czech Republic) Martin Damm (United States) Jim Grabb	4–6, 5–7
Loss	19–14	Aug 1998	Los Angeles, United States	Hard	(United States) Jeff Tarango	(Australia) Patrick Rafter (Australia) Sandon Stolle	4–6, 4–6
Win	20–14	Oct 1998	Vienna, Austria	Carpet (i)	(Russia) Yevgeny Kafelnikov	(South Africa) David Adams (South Africa) John-Laffnie de Jager	7–5, 6–3
Loss	20–15	Nov 1998	Moscow, Russia	Carpet (i)	(Russia) Yevgeny Kafelnikov	(United States) Jared Palmer (United States) Jeff Tarango	4–6, 7–6, 2–6
Win	21–15	Jan 1999	Auckland, New Zealand	Hard	(United States) Jeff Tarango	(Czech Republic) Jiří Novák (Czech Republic) David Rikl	7–5, 7–5
Win	22–15	Feb 1999	St. Petersburg, Russia	Carpet (i)	(United States) Jeff Tarango	(Netherlands) Menno Oosting (Romania) Andrei Pavel	3–6, 6–3, 7–5
Win	23–15	Apr 1999	Tokyo, Japan	Hard	(United States) Jeff Tarango	(Zimbabwe) Wayne Black (United States) Brian MacPhie	4–3 ret.
Win	24–15	Nov 1999	Moscow, Russia	Carpet (i)	(United States) Justin Gimelstob	(Ukraine) Andriy Medvedev (Russia) Marat Safin	6–2, 6–1
Win	25–15	Apr 2002	Barcelona, Spain	Clay	(Australia) Michael Hill	(Argentina) Lucas Arnold Ker (Argentina) Gastón Etlis	6–4, 6–4

== Doubles performance timeline ==
Key
W	F	SF	QF	#R	RR	Q#	DNQ	A	NH

(W) winner; (F) finalist; (SF) semifinalist; (QF) quarterfinalist; (#R) rounds 4, 3, 2, 1; (RR) round-robin stage; (Q#) qualification round; (DNQ) did not qualify; (A) absent; (NH) not held; (SR) strike rate (events won / competed); (W–L) win–loss record.

Tournament	1989	1990	1991	1992	1993	1994	1995	1996	1997	1998	1999	2000	2001	2002	2003	Career SR	Career win–loss
Grand Slam tournaments
Australian Open	A	A	1R	2R	1R	2R	2R	3R	A	1R	QF	1R	A	3R	A	0 / 10	10–10
French Open	A	A	2R	1R	A	A	2R	W	W	2R	QF	A	A	1R	1R	2 / 9	18–7
Wimbledon	A	A	2R	2R	2R	1R	1R	1R	1R	3R	1R	A	A	1R	1R	0 / 11	5–11
US Open	A	A	1R	1R	1R	1R	2R	1R	W	2R	1R	A	1R	A	A	1 / 10	8–9
Grand Slam SR	0 / 0	0 / 0	0 / 4	0 / 4	0 / 3	0 / 3	0 / 4	1 / 4	2 / 3	0 / 4	0 / 4	0 / 1	0 / 1	0 / 3	0 / 2	3 / 40	N/A
Annual win–loss	0–0	0–0	2–4	2–4	1–3	1–3	3–4	8–3	12–1	4–4	6–4	0–1	0–1	2–3	0–2	N/A	41–37
Masters Series
Indian Wells	NME	A	A	A	A	A	A	A	A	QF	1R	2R	A	A	A	0 / 3	2–3
Miami	NME	A	A	A	A	SF	2R	A	A	QF	2R	3R	A	1R	A	0 / 6	7–6
Monte Carlo	NME	A	A	A	A	F	1R	1R	SF	2R	QF	1R	A	A	A	0 / 7	8–7
Rome	NME	A	A	A	A	2R	W	1R	2R	QF	2R	1R	A	2R	A	1 / 8	11–7
Hamburg	NME	A	A	A	A	2R	1R	QF	A	A	QF	1R	A	2R	A	0 / 6	6–6
Canada	NME	A	A	A	A	A	2R	1R	QF	2R	1R	A	QF	1R	A	0 / 7	4–7
Cincinnati	NME	A	A	A	A	QF	1R	2R	2R	SF	2R	A	A	1R	A	0 / 7	5–7
Madrid (Stuttgart)	NME	A	A	A	A	2R	F	2R	2R	QF	2R	A	A	A	A	0 / 6	5–6
Paris	NME	A	A	A	A	QF	2R	F	2R	2R	QF	A	A	A	A	0 / 6	8–6
Masters Series SR	N/A	0 / 0	0 / 0	0 / 0	0 / 0	0 / 7	1 / 8	0 / 7	0 / 6	0 / 8	0 / 9	0 / 5	0 / 1	0 / 5	0 / 0	1 / 56	N/A
Annual win–loss	N/A	0–0	0–0	0–0	0–0	13–7	7–7	5–7	4–6	10–8	9–9	3–5	2–1	2–5	0–0	N/A	56–55
Year-end ranking	325	103	54	160	58	21	11	8	5	26	20	143	113	65	1204	N/A	

== Best Grand Slam results details ==
=== Singles ===
	Australian Open			
1994 Australian Open
Round	Opponent	Rank	Score	DVR
1R	(Sweden) Christian Bergström	No. 85	6–3, 1–1 ret.	No. 104
2R	(Italy) Andrea Gaudenzi	No. 66	6–3, 6–2, 6–2	No. 104
3R	(South Africa) Wayne Ferreira (13)	No. 18	6–4, 2–6, 6–7^{(4–7)}, 4–6	No. 104

	French Open			
1994 French Open
Round	Opponent	Rank	Score	DVR
1R	(Spain) Javier Sánchez	No. 24	7–6^{(7–3)}, 0–6, 6–2, 6–4	No. 61
2R	(Sweden) Magnus Gustafsson (13)	No. 13	0–6, 6–4, 7–6^{(7–4)}, 6–4	No. 61
3R	(Netherlands) Jacco Eltingh	No. 62	6–7^{(6–8)}, 6–7^{(4–7)}, 6–3, 3–6	No. 61
1998 French Open
Round	Opponent	Rank	Score	DVR
1R	(Netherlands) Sjeng Schalken	No. 54	1–6, 6–2, 6–4, 7–5	No. 77
2R	(United States) Jan-Michael Gambill	No. 66	6–4, 2–6, 7–5, 7–6^{(7–0)}	No. 77
3R	(Russia) Marat Safin (Q)	No. 116	3–6, 6–3, 3–6, 5–7	No. 77

	Wimbledon Championships			
1994 Wimbledon
Round	Opponent	Rank	Score	DVR
1R	(France) Gérard Solvès	No. 118	6–4, 6–2, 4–6, 2–6, 6–2	No. 51
2R	(Australia) Mark Woodforde	No. 54	6–3, 7–6^{(7–2)}, 6–4	No. 51
3R	(Russia) Yevgeny Kafelnikov (15)	No. 16	4–6, 7–5, 6–4, 3–6, 6–4	No. 51
4R	(United States) Pete Sampras (1)	No. 1	4–6, 1–6, 6–7^{(5–7)}	No. 51

	US Open			
1995 US Open
Round	Opponent	Rank	Score	DVR
1R	(Germany) Martin Sinner	No. 52	6–4, 6–7^{(6–8)}, 6–3, 2–6, 7–6^{(7–4)}	No. 67
2R	(Spain) Sergi Bruguera (11)	No. 11	6–2, 6–3, 6–4	No. 67
3R	(Venezuela) Nicolás Pereira (Q)	No. 105	4–6, 7–6^{(7–5)}, 6–2, 7–6^{(7–3)}	No. 67
4R	(United States) Patrick McEnroe	No. 42	6–7^{(8–10)}, 3–6, 4–6	No. 67
1997 US Open
Round	Opponent	Rank	Score	DVR
1R	(Italy) Laurence Tieleman (Q)	No. 339	4–6, 6–4, 1–6, 6–3, 6–2	No. 83
2R	(United States) Michael Sell (Q)	No. 239	4–6, 7–6^{(7–5)}, 6–1, 6–2	No. 83
3R	(Australia) Mark Philippoussis (14)	No. 19	7–6^{(7–4)}, 7–5, 6–2	No. 83
4R	(United Kingdom) Greg Rusedski	No. 20	6–7^{(2–7)}, 2–6, 2–6	No. 83

=== Doubles ===
	Australian Open			
1999 Australian Open
with (Russia) Yevgeny Kafelnikov (10th seed)
Round	Opponents	Rank	Score	DVR
1R	(South Africa) Jeff Coetzee (Netherlands) Sander Groen	No. 129; No. 116	6–4, 2–6, 6–3	No. 23
2R	(Czech Republic) Jiří Novák (Czech Republic) David Rikl	No. 30; No. 38	6–3, 6–7^{(0–7)}, 9–7	No. 23
3R	(Argentina) Lucas Arnold Ker (Czech Republic) Pavel Vízner	No. 107; No. 62	6–3, 3–6, 6–4	No. 23
QF	(Australia) Todd Woodbridge (2) (Australia) Mark Woodforde (2)	No. 6 No. 6	6–7^{(3–7)}, 3–6, 1–6	No. 23

	French Open			
1996 French Open
with (Russia) Yevgeny Kafelnikov (7th seed)
Round	Opponents	Rank	Score	DVR
1R	(France) Jérôme Golmard (France) Lionel Roux	No. 330; No. 249	6–0, 6–3	No. 22
2R	(United States) Kelly Jones (United States) Chris Woodruff	No. 87; No. 155	6–3, 6–3	No. 22
3R	(Argentina) Luis Lobo (10) (Spain) Javier Sánchez (10)	No. 26; No. 25	7–6^{(10–8)}, 7–5	No. 22
QF	(United States) Donald Johnson (United States) Francisco Montana	No. 98; No. 68	6–2, 7–6^{(10–8)}	No. 22
SF	(United States) Jared Palmer (United States) Jonathan Stark	No. 74; No. 48	6–4, 7–6^{(7–4)}	No. 22
F	(France) Guy Forget (5) (Switzerland) Jakob Hlasek (5)	No. 19; No. 9	6–2, 6–3	No. 22
1997 French Open
with (Russia) Yevgeny Kafelnikov (4th seed)
Round	Opponents	Rank	Score	DVR
1R	(Sweden) Rikard Bergh (Sweden) David Ekerot	No. 125; No. 61	6–1, 5–7, 6–3	No. 5
2R	(Netherlands) Tom Nijssen (Netherlands) Stephen Noteboom	No. 74; No. 94	6–1, 6–4	No. 5
3R	(Zimbabwe) Wayne Black (United States) Jim Grabb	No. 141; No. 38	6–4, 7–6^{(7–4)}	No. 5
QF	(Germany) Karsten Braasch (Germany) Jens Knippschild	No. 72; No. 83	4–6, 7–6^{(7–2)}, 6–3	No. 5
SF	(Netherlands) Jacco Eltingh (2) (Netherlands) Paul Haarhuis (2)	No. 4 No. 3	7–6^{(7–4)}, 7–6^{(7–3)}	No. 5
F	(Australia) Todd Woodbridge (1) (Australia) Mark Woodforde (1)	No. 1 No. 1	7–6^{(14–12)}, 4–6, 6–3	No. 5

	Wimbledon Championships			
1998 Wimbledon
with (Russia) Yevgeny Kafelnikov (7th seed)
Round	Opponents	Rank	Score	DVR
1R	(United Kingdom) Nick Gould (WC) (United Kingdom) Mark Petchey (WC)	No. 328; No. 255	6–3, 6–0	No. 17
2R	(United States) Brandon Coupe (United States) David DiLucia	No. 74; No. 125	6–1, 6–4	No. 17
3R	(Sweden) Nicklas Kulti (10) (Australia) David Macpherson (10)	No. 20; No. 19	6–7^{(3–7)}, 3–6	No. 17

	US Open			
1997 US Open
with (Russia) Yevgeny Kafelnikov (4th seed)
Round	Opponents	Rank	Score	DVR
1R	(Mexico) Óscar Ortiz (Q) (Brazil) André Sá (Q)	No. 142; No. 172	6–3, 6–2	No. 6
2R	(Sweden) Patrik Fredriksson (Belgium) Tom Vanhoudt	No. 113; No. 90	4–6, 6–2, 6–1	No. 6
3R	(United States) Donald Johnson (13) (United States) Francisco Montana (13)	No. 27; No. 30	1–6, 6–3, 6–4	No. 6
QF	(South Africa) John-Laffnie de Jager (Q) (South Africa) Robbie Koenig (Q)	No. 163; No. 222	7–5, 7–5	No. 6
SF	(India) Mahesh Bhupathi (10) (India) Leander Paes (10)	No. 19; No. 23	7–6, 7–6	No. 6
F	(Sweden) Jonas Björkman (11) (Sweden) Nicklas Kulti (11)	No. 26; No. 29	7–6, 6–3	No. 6
