= Hendrik Jan Davids =

Dutch tennis player

- Country (sports): Netherlands
- Residence: Eindhoven, Netherlands
- Born: 30 January 1969 (age 57) De Bilt, Netherlands
- Height: 1.83 m (6 ft 0 in)
- Turned pro: 1988
- Retired: 1997
- Plays: Left-handed
- Prize money: $923,459

Singles
- Career record: 7-27
- Career titles: 0
- Highest ranking: No. 171 (17 June 1996)

Grand Slam singles results
- Wimbledon: 1R (1997)

Doubles
- Career record: 157-156
- Career titles: 7
- Highest ranking: No. 26 (18 April 1994)

Grand Slam doubles results
- Australian Open: 4R (1994)
- French Open: QF (1993)
- Wimbledon: 4R (1993)
- US Open: QF (1996)

Hendrik Jan Davids (born 30 January 1969) is a former professional tennis player from the Netherlands.

During his career, Davids won seven doubles titles and finished as a runner-up 12 times. He achieved a career-high doubles ranking of World No. 26 in 1994.

== Career finals ==
=== Doubles: 19 (7 wins, 12 losses) ===
Result	No.	Year	Tournament	Surface	Partner	Opponents	Score
Win	1.	1990	Moscow, Soviet Union	Carpet	(Netherlands) Paul Haarhuis	(Australia) John Fitzgerald (Sweden) Anders Järryd	6–4, 7–6
Win	2.	1991	Rosmalen, Netherlands	Grass	(Netherlands) Paul Haarhuis	(Netherlands) Richard Krajicek (Netherlands) Jan Siemerink	6–3, 7–6
Loss	1.	1992	Copenhagen, Denmark	Carpet	(Czech Republic) Libor Pimek	(Sweden) Nicklas Kulti (Sweden) Magnus Larsson	3–6, 4–6
Win	3.	1992	Estoril, Portugal	Clay	(Czech Republic) Libor Pimek	(United States) Luke Jensen (Australia) Laurie Warder	3–6, 6–3, 7–5
Win	4.	1992	Gstaad, Switzerland	Clay	(Czech Republic) Libor Pimek	(Czech Republic) Petr Korda (Czech Republic) Cyril Suk	W/O
Loss	2.	1993	Gstaad, Switzerland	Clay	(South Africa) Piet Norval	(France) Cédric Pioline (Switzerland) Marc Rosset	3–6, 6–3, 6–7
Loss	3.	1993	Hilversum, Netherlands	Clay	(Czech Republic) Libor Pimek	(Netherlands) Jacco Eltingh (Netherlands) Paul Haarhuis	6–4, 2–6, 5–7
Win	5.	1993	Prague, Czech Republic	Clay	(Czech Republic) Libor Pimek	(Mexico) Jorge Lozano (Brazil) Jaime Oncins	6–3, 7–6
Win	6.	1993	Bolzano, Italy	Carpet	(South Africa) Piet Norval	(South Africa) David Adams (Russia) Andrei Olhovskiy	6–3, 6–2
Loss	4.	1994	Milan, Italy	Carpet	(South Africa) Piet Norval	(Netherlands) Tom Nijssen (Czech Republic) Cyril Suk	6–4, 6–7, 6–7
Loss	5.	1994	Nice, France	Clay	(South Africa) Piet Norval	(Spain) Javier Sánchez (Australia) Mark Woodforde	5–7, 3–6
Loss	6.	1994	Antwerp, Belgium	Carpet	(Canada) Sébastien Lareau	(Sweden) Jan Apell (Sweden) Jonas Björkman	6–4, 1–6, 2–6
Loss	7.	1995	Rosmalen, Netherlands	Grass	(Russia) Andrei Olhovskiy	(Netherlands) Richard Krajicek (Netherlands) Jan Siemerink	5–7, 3–6
Loss	8.	1995	Palermo, Italy	Clay	(South Africa) Piet Norval	(Spain) Àlex Corretja (France) Fabrice Santoro	7–6, 4–6, 3–6
Loss	9.	1996	Zagreb, Croatia	Carpet	(Czech Republic) Martin Damm	(Netherlands) Menno Oosting (Czech Republic) Libor Pimek	3–6, 6–7
Loss	10.	1996	Rotterdam, Netherlands	Carpet	(Czech Republic) Cyril Suk	(South Africa) David Adams (South Africa) Marius Barnard	3–6, 7–5, 6–7
Loss	11.	1997	Bucharest, Romania	Clay	(Argentina) Daniel Orsanic	(Argentina) Luis Lobo (Spain) Javier Sánchez	5–7, 5–7
Loss	12.	1997	Palermo, Italy	Clay	(Argentina) Daniel Orsanic	(Australia) Andrew Kratzmann (Czech Republic) Libor Pimek	6–3, 3–6, 6–7
Win	7.	1997	Santiago, Chile	Clay	(Australia) Andrew Kratzmann	(Spain) Julian Alonso (Ecuador) Nicolás Lapentti	7–6, 5–7, 6–4
