= Copenhagen Open =

Defunct tennis tournament
- Tour: ATP Tour (1991–2003); WCT Circuit (1973)
- Founded: 1973
- Abolished: 2003
- Editions: 15
- Location: Copenhagen, Denmark
- Surface: Carpet (i) (1973–1999); Hard (i) (2000–2003)

The Copenhagen Open was a men's indoor tennis tournament held in Copenhagen, Denmark. It was first held in February 1973 as part of the WCT Circuit and featured renowned players such as Ken Rosewall, Fred Stolle, Arthur Ashe and Tom Okker. It was played indoors on a carpet surface.

The tournament was not held the following two years but returned on the calendar in 1976 without any of the first-tier players. After 1976 the tournament was discontinued. It was re-introduced in 1991 as part of the ATP Tour and was halted again in 2003. The only player to win the Copenhagen Open more than once was Magnus Gustafsson (1998, 1999). The only Danish winner was Lars Elvstrøm.

== Finals ==
=== Singles ===
Year	Champions	Runners-up	Score
1973	(United Kingdom) Roger Taylor	(United States) Marty Riessen	6–2, 6–3, 7–6
1974–75	Not Held		
1976	(Denmark) Lars Elvstrøm	(France) Jean-François Caujolle	6–4, 6–4
1977–90	Not Held		
1991	(Sweden) Jonas Svensson	(Sweden) Anders Järryd	6–7^{(5-7)}, 6–2, 6–2
1992	(Sweden) Magnus Larsson	(Sweden) Anders Järryd	6–4, 7–6^{(7-5)}
1993	(Russia) Andrei Olhovskiy	(Sweden) Nicklas Kulti	7–5, 3–6, 6–2
1994	(Russia) Yevgeny Kafelnikov	(Czech Republic) Daniel Vacek	6–3, 7–5
1995	(Germany) Martin Sinner	(Russia) Andrei Olhovskiy	6–7^{(3-7)}, 7–6^{(10-8)}, 6–3
1996	(France) Cédric Pioline	(Denmark) Kenneth Carlsen	6–2, 7–6^{(9-7)}
1997	(Sweden) Thomas Johansson	(Czech Republic) Martin Damm	6–4, 3–6, 6–2
1998	(Sweden) Magnus Gustafsson	(Germany) David Prinosil	3–6, 6–1, 6–1
1999	(Sweden) Magnus Gustafsson	(France) Fabrice Santoro	6–4, 6–1
2000	(Sweden) Andreas Vinciguerra	(Sweden) Magnus Larsson	6–3, 7–6^{(7-5)}
2001	(United Kingdom) Tim Henman	(Sweden) Andreas Vinciguerra	6–3, 6–4
2002	(Germany) Lars Burgsmüller	(Belgium) Olivier Rochus	6–3, 6–3
2003	(Slovakia) Karol Kučera	(Belgium) Olivier Rochus	7–6^{(7-4)}, 6–4

=== Doubles ===
Year	Champions	Runners-up	Score
1973	(United States) Tom Gorman (United States) Erik van Dillen	(United Kingdom) Mark Cox (United Kingdom) Graham Stilwell	6–4, 6–4
1974–90	Not Held		
1991	(Australia) Todd Woodbridge (Australia) Mark Woodforde	(France) Mansour Bahrami (Soviet Union) Andrei Olhovskiy	6–3, 6–1
1992	(Sweden) Nicklas Kulti (Sweden) Magnus Larsson	(Netherlands) Hendrik Jan Davids (Belgium) Libor Pimek	6–3, 6–4
1993	(South Africa) David Adams (Russia) Andrei Olhovskiy	(Czech Republic) Martin Damm (Czech Republic) Daniel Vacek	6–3, 3–6, 6–3
1994	(Czech Republic) Martin Damm (New Zealand) Brett Steven	(Germany) David Prinosil (Germany) Udo Riglewski	6–3, 6–4
1995	(United States) Mark Keil (Sweden) Peter Nyborg	(France) Guillaume Raoux (Canada) Greg Rusedski	6–7, 6–4, 7–6
1996	(Belgium) Libor Pimek (South Africa) Byron Talbot	(Australia) Wayne Arthurs (Australia) Andrew Kratzmann	7–6, 3–6, 6–3
1997	(Russia) Andrei Olhovskiy (New Zealand) Brett Steven	(Denmark) Kenneth Carlsen (Denmark) Frederik Fetterlein	6–4, 6–2
1998	(Netherlands) Tom Kempers (Netherlands) Menno Oosting	(New Zealand) Brett Steven (Netherlands) Jan Siemerink	6–4, 7–6
1999	(Belarus) Max Mirnyi (Russia) Andrei Olhovskiy	(Germany) Marc-Kevin Goellner (Germany) David Prinosil	6–7, 7–6, 6–1
2000	(Czech Republic) Martin Damm (Germany) David Prinosil	(Sweden) Jonas Björkman (Canada) Sébastien Lareau	6–1, 5–7, 7–5
2001	(Zimbabwe) Wayne Black (Zimbabwe) Kevin Ullyett	(Czech Republic) Jiří Novák (Czech Republic) David Rikl	6–3, 6–3
2002	(Germany) Michael Kohlmann (Austria) Julian Knowle	(Czech Republic) Jiří Novák (Czech Republic) Radek Štěpánek	7–6, 7–5
2003	(Czech Republic) Tomáš Cibulec (Czech Republic) Pavel Vízner	(Germany) Michael Kohlmann (Austria) Julian Knowle	7–5, 5–7, 6–2
