= Frederik Fetterlein =

Danish tennis player

- Country (sports): Denmark
- Born: 11 July 1970 (age 55) Rungsted, Denmark
- Height: 1.90 m (6 ft 3 in)
- Turned pro: 1989
- Retired: 2004
- Plays: Right-handed (two-handed backhand)
- Prize money: $441,561

Singles
- Career record: 41–69
- Career titles: 0
- Highest ranking: No. 75 (23 October 1995)

Grand Slam singles results
- Australian Open: 2R (1996)
- French Open: 2R (1995)
- Wimbledon: 2R (1995, 1997)
- US Open: 2R (1995)

Other tournaments
- Olympic Games: 2R (1996)

Doubles
- Career record: 12–20
- Career titles: 0
- Highest ranking: No. 273 (9 June 1997)

Other doubles tournaments
- Olympic Games: 1R (1992, 1996)

Frederik Fetterlein (born 11 July 1970) is a retired tennis player from Denmark, who turned professional in 1989.

== Tennis career ==
The right-hander Fetterlein represented his native country at the 1996 Summer Olympics in Atlanta, where he was defeated in the second round by Switzerland's Marc Rosset. Fetterlein reached his career-high ATP singles ranking of World No. 75 in October 1995. During his career, he defeated Thomas Muster and Stefan Edberg, amongst other top players.

== ATP Challengers and ITF Futures titles ==
=== Singles: 4 ===
Legend
ATP Challenger Tour (2)
ITF Futures Tour (2)

No.	Date	Tournament	Surface	Opponent	Score
1.	Nov 1994	Rogaška Slatina, Slovenia	Carpet	(Czech Republic) Radomír Vašek	6–3, 6–4
2.	Feb 1997	Cherbourg, France	Hard	(France) Lionel Roux	6–3, 6–4
1.	Jul 1998	Denmark F1	Clay	(Sweden) Andreas Vinciguerra	6–1, 6–2
2.	Aug 2000	Great Britain F7	Hard	(Australia) Paul Baccanello	1–4, 5–4^{(6)}, 4–2, 5–4^{(4)}

== See also ==
- List of Denmark Davis Cup team representatives
