= 1996 ATP Tour =

Men's tennis circuit

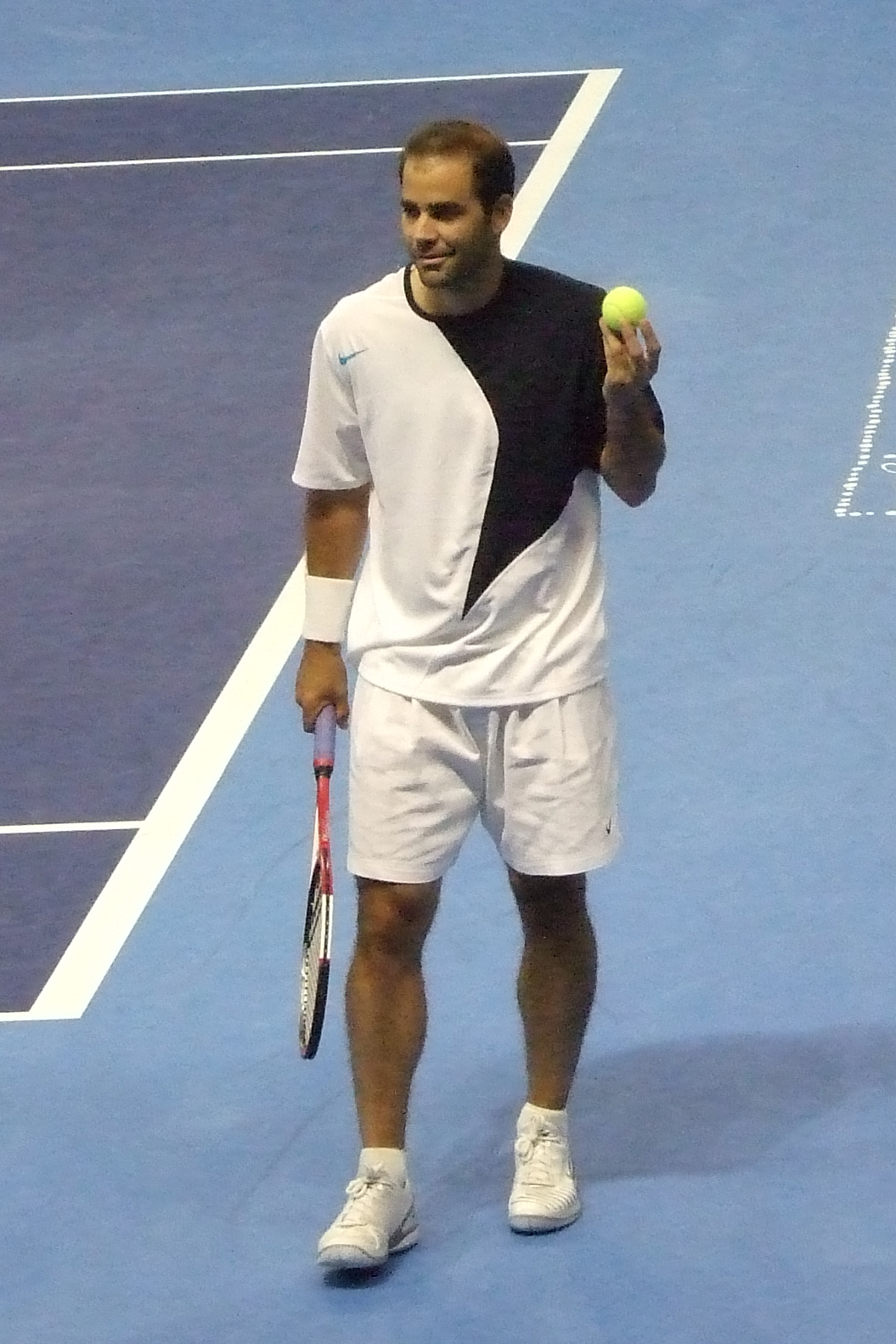
- Pete Sampras finished the year ranked world No. 1 for the fourth time in his career. He won eight titles during the season, including a major at the US Open, as well as the ATP Tour World Championships.

Details
- Duration: January 1, 1996– November 19, 1996
- Categories: Grand Slam (4); ATP Super 9 (9); ATP Championship Series (11); ATP World Series

Achievements (singles)
- Most titles: (United States) Pete Sampras (8)
- Most finals: (Croatia) Goran Ivanišević (10) (Russia) Yevgeny Kafelnikov (10)
- Prize money leader: (Germany) Boris Becker ($4,290,477)
- Points leader: (United States) Pete Sampras (4865)

Awards
- Player of the year: (United States) Pete Sampras
- Doubles team of the year: (Australia) Todd Woodbridge (Australia) Mark Woodforde
- Most improved player of the year: (United Kingdom) Tim Henman
- Newcomer of the year: (Slovakia) Dominik Hrbatý
- Comeback player of the year: (France) Stephane Simian

The Association of Tennis Professionals (ATP) Tour is the elite tour for professional tennis organized by the ATP. The ATP Tour includes the Grand Slam tournaments (organized by the International Tennis Federation (ITF)), the ATP Super 9, the ATP Championship Series, the ATP World Series, the ATP World Team Cup, the Davis Cup (organized by the ITF), the ATP Tour World Championships and the Grand Slam Cup (organized by the ITF).

== Schedule ==
This is the complete schedule of events on the 1996 ATP Tour, with player progression documented from the quarterfinals stage.

Key

Grand Slam events
ATP Tour World Championships
Summer Olympic Games
ATP Super 9
ATP Championship Series
ATP World Series
Team events

=== January ===
Week	Tournament	Champions	Runners-up	Semifinalists	Quarterfinalists
1 Jan	Hopman Cup; Perth, Australia; Hopman Cup; Hard (i) – 8 teams (RR)	Croatia; 2–1	Switzerland	Round Robin (Group A) United States; France; South Africa	Round Robin (Group B) Australia; Netherlands; Germany
1 Jan	Australian Men's Hardcourt Championships; Adelaide, Australia; World Series; Hard – $303,000 – 32S/16D; Singles – Doubles	(Russia) Yevgeny Kafelnikov; 7–6^{(7–0)}, 3–6, 6–1	(Zimbabwe) Byron Black	(Argentina) Javier Frana (Czech Republic) Martin Damm	(United Kingdom) Greg Rusedski (Italy) Renzo Furlan (Sweden) Henrik Holm (Czech Republic) Daniel Vacek
1 Jan	Australian Men's Hardcourt Championships; Adelaide, Australia; World Series; Hard – $303,000 – 32S/16D; Singles – Doubles	(Australia) Todd Woodbridge (Australia) Mark Woodforde; 7–5, 7–6	(Sweden) Jonas Björkman (United States) Tommy Ho	(Argentina) Javier Frana (Czech Republic) Martin Damm	(United Kingdom) Greg Rusedski (Italy) Renzo Furlan (Sweden) Henrik Holm (Czech Republic) Daniel Vacek
1 Jan	Qatar ExxonMobil Open; Doha, Qatar; World Series; Hard – $600,000 – 32S/16D; Singles – Doubles	(Czech Republic) Petr Korda; 7–6^{(7–5)}, 2–6, 7–6^{(7–5)}	(Morocco) Younes El Aynaoui	(Austria) Thomas Muster (Germany) David Prinosil	(Romania) Adrian Voinea (France) Guillaume Raoux (Sweden) Magnus Larsson (Venezuela) Nicolas Pereira
1 Jan	Qatar ExxonMobil Open; Doha, Qatar; World Series; Hard – $600,000 – 32S/16D; Singles – Doubles	(The Bahamas) Mark Knowles (Canada) Daniel Nestor; 7–6, 6–3	(Netherlands) Jacco Eltingh (Netherlands) Paul Haarhuis	(Austria) Thomas Muster (Germany) David Prinosil	(Romania) Adrian Voinea (France) Guillaume Raoux (Sweden) Magnus Larsson (Venezuela) Nicolas Pereira
8 Jan	Indonesia Open; Jakarta, Indonesia; World Series; Hard – $303,000 – 32S/16D; Singles – Doubles	(Netherlands) Sjeng Schalken; 6–3, 6–2	(Morocco) Younes El Aynaoui	(Netherlands) Paul Haarhuis (United States) Michael Joyce	(France) Guillaume Raoux (Spain) Emilio Sánchez (Sweden) Mikael Tillström (Austria) Gilbert Schaller
8 Jan	Indonesia Open; Jakarta, Indonesia; World Series; Hard – $303,000 – 32S/16D; Singles – Doubles	(United States) Rick Leach (United States) Scott Melville; 6–1, 2–6, 6–1	(United States) Kent Kinnear (United States) Dave Randall	(Netherlands) Paul Haarhuis (United States) Michael Joyce	(France) Guillaume Raoux (Spain) Emilio Sánchez (Sweden) Mikael Tillström (Austria) Gilbert Schaller
8 Jan	Peters International; Sydney, Australia; World Series; Hard – $303,000 – 32S/16D; Singles – Doubles	(United States) Todd Martin; 5–7, 6–3, 6–4	(Croatia) Goran Ivanišević	(Australia) Todd Woodbridge (United Kingdom) Greg Rusedski	(Australia) Mark Woodforde (Australia) Jason Stoltenberg (Australia) Richard Fromberg (Australia) Scott Draper
8 Jan	Peters International; Sydney, Australia; World Series; Hard – $303,000 – 32S/16D; Singles – Doubles	(South Africa) Ellis Ferreira (Netherlands) Jan Siemerink; 5–7, 6–4, 6–1	(United States) Patrick McEnroe (Australia) Sandon Stolle	(Australia) Todd Woodbridge (United Kingdom) Greg Rusedski	(Australia) Mark Woodforde (Australia) Jason Stoltenberg (Australia) Richard Fromberg (Australia) Scott Draper
8 Jan	BellSouth Open; Auckland, New Zealand; World Series; Hard – $303,000 – 32S/16D; Singles – Doubles	(Czech Republic) Jiří Novák; 6–4, 6–4	(New Zealand) Brett Steven	(Argentina) Javier Frana (France) Guy Forget	(Peru) Jaime Yzaga (Argentina) Hernán Gumy (Czech Republic) David Rikl (United States) MaliVai Washington
8 Jan	BellSouth Open; Auckland, New Zealand; World Series; Hard – $303,000 – 32S/16D; Singles – Doubles	(South Africa) Marcos Ondruska (United States) Jack Waite; W/O	(Sweden) Jonas Björkman (New Zealand) Brett Steven	(Argentina) Javier Frana (France) Guy Forget	(Peru) Jaime Yzaga (Argentina) Hernán Gumy (Czech Republic) David Rikl (United States) MaliVai Washington
15 Jan; 22 Jan	Australian Open; Melbourne, Australia; Grand Slam; Hard – $3,180,318 – 128S/64D; Singles – Doubles; Mixed doubles	(Germany) Boris Becker; 6–2, 6–4, 2–6, 6–2	(United States) Michael Chang	(Australia) Mark Woodforde (United States) Andre Agassi	(Sweden) Thomas Enqvist (Russia) Yevgeny Kafelnikov (Sweden) Mikael Tillström (United States) Jim Courier
15 Jan; 22 Jan	Australian Open; Melbourne, Australia; Grand Slam; Hard – $3,180,318 – 128S/64D; Singles – Doubles; Mixed doubles	(Sweden) Stefan Edberg (Czech Republic) Petr Korda; 7–5, 7–5, 4–6, 6–1	(Canada) Sébastien Lareau (United States) Alex O'Brien	(Australia) Mark Woodforde (United States) Andre Agassi	(Sweden) Thomas Enqvist (Russia) Yevgeny Kafelnikov (Sweden) Mikael Tillström (United States) Jim Courier
15 Jan; 22 Jan	Australian Open; Melbourne, Australia; Grand Slam; Hard – $3,180,318 – 128S/64D; Singles – Doubles; Mixed doubles	(Latvia) Larisa Neiland (Australia) Mark Woodforde; 4–6, 7–5, 6–0	(United States) Nicole Arendt (United States) Luke Jensen	(Australia) Mark Woodforde (United States) Andre Agassi	(Sweden) Thomas Enqvist (Russia) Yevgeny Kafelnikov (Sweden) Mikael Tillström (United States) Jim Courier
29 Jan	Croatian Indoors; Zagreb, Croatia; World Series $375,000 – carpet (i) – 32S/16D; Singles – Doubles	(Croatia) Goran Ivanišević; 3–6, 6–3, 6–2	(France) Cédric Pioline	(France) Guy Forget (Germany) Marc-Kevin Goellner	(Romania) Adrian Voinea (Germany) Carl-Uwe Steeb (Belgium) Filip Dewulf (France) Guillaume Raoux
29 Jan	Croatian Indoors; Zagreb, Croatia; World Series $375,000 – carpet (i) – 32S/16D; Singles – Doubles	(Netherlands) Menno Oosting (Belgium) Libor Pimek; 6–3, 7–6	(Czech Republic) Martin Damm (Netherlands) Hendrik Jan Davids	(France) Guy Forget (Germany) Marc-Kevin Goellner	(Romania) Adrian Voinea (Germany) Carl-Uwe Steeb (Belgium) Filip Dewulf (France) Guillaume Raoux
29 Jan	Shanghai Open; Shanghai, China; World Series $303,000 – carpet (i) – 32S/16D; Singles – Doubles	(Russia) Andrei Olhovskiy; 7–6^{(7–5)}, 6–2	(The Bahamas) Mark Knowles	(Australia) Michael Tebbutt (United Kingdom) Tim Henman	(United States) Jeff Tarango (South Africa) Marcos Ondruska (Italy) Cristiano Caratti (United Kingdom) Mark Petchey
29 Jan	Shanghai Open; Shanghai, China; World Series $303,000 – carpet (i) – 32S/16D; Singles – Doubles	(The Bahamas) Mark Knowles (The Bahamas) Roger Smith; 4–6, 6–2, 7–6	(United States) Jim Grabb (Australia) Michael Tebbutt	(Australia) Michael Tebbutt (United Kingdom) Tim Henman	(United States) Jeff Tarango (South Africa) Marcos Ondruska (Italy) Cristiano Caratti (United Kingdom) Mark Petchey

=== February ===
Week	Tournament	Champions	Runners-up	Semifinalists	Quarterfinalists
5 Feb	Davis Cup first round Rome, Italy – clay Johannesburg, South Africa – hard (i); Geneva, Switzerland – clay (i); Besançon, France – hard (i); Jaipur, India – grass Katrineholm, Sweden – carpet (i); Plzeň, Czech Republic – carpet (i); Carlsbad, CA, United States – hard	First-round winners Italy 3–2; South Africa 3–2; Germany 5–0; France 5–0; India 5–0; Sweden 4–1; Czech Republic 3–2; United States 5–0	First-round losers Russia; Austria; Switzerland; Denmark; Netherlands; Belgium; Hungary; Mexico		
12 Feb	Dubai Tennis Championships; Dubai, United Arab Emirates; World Series; Hard – $1,014,250 – 32S/16D; Singles – Doubles	(Croatia) Goran Ivanišević; 6–4, 6–3	(Spain) Albert Costa	(Spain) Javier Sánchez (Germany) David Prinosil	(Australia) Sandon Stolle (Netherlands) Hendrik Jan Davids (South Africa) Wayne Ferreira (Sweden) Thomas Enqvist
12 Feb	Dubai Tennis Championships; Dubai, United Arab Emirates; World Series; Hard – $1,014,250 – 32S/16D; Singles – Doubles	(Zimbabwe) Byron Black (Canada) Grant Connell; 6–0, 6–1	(Czech Republic) Karel Nováček (Czech Republic) Jiří Novák	(Spain) Javier Sánchez (Germany) David Prinosil	(Australia) Sandon Stolle (Netherlands) Hendrik Jan Davids (South Africa) Wayne Ferreira (Sweden) Thomas Enqvist
12 Feb	Open 13; Marseille, France; World Series; Hard (i) – $514,250 – 32S/16D; Singles – Doubles	(France) Guy Forget; 7–5, 6–4	(France) Cédric Pioline	(Spain) Tomás Carbonell (Germany) Hendrik Dreekmann	(France) Stephane Simian (Romania) Adrian Voinea (Belgium) Filip Dewulf (Spain) Sergi Bruguera
12 Feb	Open 13; Marseille, France; World Series; Hard (i) – $514,250 – 32S/16D; Singles – Doubles	(France) Jean-Philippe Fleurian (France) Guillaume Raoux; 6–3, 6–2	(South Africa) Marius Barnard (Sweden) Peter Nyborg	(Spain) Tomás Carbonell (Germany) Hendrik Dreekmann	(France) Stephane Simian (Romania) Adrian Voinea (Belgium) Filip Dewulf (Spain) Sergi Bruguera
12 Feb	Sybase Open; San Jose, CA, United States; World Series; Hard (i) – $303,000 – 32S/16D; Singles – Doubles	(United States) Pete Sampras; 6–2, 6–3	(United States) Andre Agassi	(United States) Michael Chang (Slovakia) Ján Krošlák	(United States) Richey Reneberg (Australia) Jason Stoltenberg (United States) Vincent Spadea (United Kingdom) Greg Rusedski
12 Feb	Sybase Open; San Jose, CA, United States; World Series; Hard (i) – $303,000 – 32S/16D; Singles – Doubles	(United States) Trevor Kronemann (Australia) David Macpherson; 6–4, 3–6, 6–3	(United States) Richey Reneberg (United States) Jonathan Stark	(United States) Michael Chang (Slovakia) Ján Krošlák	(United States) Richey Reneberg (Australia) Jason Stoltenberg (United States) Vincent Spadea (United Kingdom) Greg Rusedski
19 Feb	ECC Antwerp; Antwerp, Belgium; Championship Series; Carpet (i) – $875,000 – 32S/16D; Singles – Doubles	(Germany) Michael Stich; 6–3, 6–2, 7–6^{(7–5)}	(Croatia) Goran Ivanišević	(Germany) Boris Becker (Ukraine) Andrei Medvedev	(Spain) Francisco Clavet (Italy) Renzo Furlan (Netherlands) Richard Krajicek (Switzerland) Marc Rosset
19 Feb	ECC Antwerp; Antwerp, Belgium; Championship Series; Carpet (i) – $875,000 – 32S/16D; Singles – Doubles	(Sweden) Jonas Björkman (Sweden) Nicklas Kulti; 6–4, 6–4	(Russia) Yevgeny Kafelnikov (Netherlands) Menno Oosting	(Germany) Boris Becker (Ukraine) Andrei Medvedev	(Spain) Francisco Clavet (Italy) Renzo Furlan (Netherlands) Richard Krajicek (Switzerland) Marc Rosset
19 Feb	Kroger St. Jude International; Memphis, TN, United States; Championship Series; Hard (i) – $683,000 – 48S/24D; Singles – Doubles	(United States) Pete Sampras; 6–4, 7–6^{(7–2)}	(United States) Todd Martin	(United States) Michael Chang (Australia) Mark Philippoussis	(Australia) Mark Woodforde (United States) MaliVai Washington (Sweden) Thomas Enqvist (Czech Republic) Jiří Novák
19 Feb	Kroger St. Jude International; Memphis, TN, United States; Championship Series; Hard (i) – $683,000 – 48S/24D; Singles – Doubles	(The Bahamas) Mark Knowles (Canada) Daniel Nestor; 7–6, 1–6, 6–4	(Australia) Todd Woodbridge (Australia) Mark Woodforde	(United States) Michael Chang (Australia) Mark Philippoussis	(Australia) Mark Woodforde (United States) MaliVai Washington (Sweden) Thomas Enqvist (Czech Republic) Jiří Novák
26 Feb	Comcast U.S. Indoor; Philadelphia, PA, United States; Championship Series; Carpet (i) – $589,250 – 32S/16D; Singles – Doubles	(United States) Jim Courier; 6–4, 6–3	(United States) Chris Woodruff	(Australia) Todd Woodbridge (Australia) Mark Woodforde	(Spain) Tomás Carbonell (Chile) Marcelo Ríos (Australia) Jason Stoltenberg (Zimbabwe) Byron Black
26 Feb	Comcast U.S. Indoor; Philadelphia, PA, United States; Championship Series; Carpet (i) – $589,250 – 32S/16D; Singles – Doubles	(Australia) Todd Woodbridge (Australia) Mark Woodforde; 7–6, 6–2	(Zimbabwe) Byron Black (Canada) Grant Connell	(Australia) Todd Woodbridge (Australia) Mark Woodforde	(Spain) Tomás Carbonell (Chile) Marcelo Ríos (Australia) Jason Stoltenberg (Zimbabwe) Byron Black
26 Feb	Internazionali di Lombardia; Milan, Italy; Championship Series; Carpet (i) – $689,250 – 32S/16D; Singles – Doubles	(Croatia) Goran Ivanišević; 6–3, 7–6^{(7–3)}	(Switzerland) Marc Rosset	(Russia) Yevgeny Kafelnikov (France) Guy Forget	(Italy) Renzo Furlan (Czech Republic) Daniel Vacek (Romania) Adrian Voinea (Ukraine) Andrei Medvedev
26 Feb	Internazionali di Lombardia; Milan, Italy; Championship Series; Carpet (i) – $689,250 – 32S/16D; Singles – Doubles	(Italy) Andrea Gaudenzi (Croatia) Goran Ivanišević; 6–4, 7–5	(France) Guy Forget (Switzerland) Jakob Hlasek	(Russia) Yevgeny Kafelnikov (France) Guy Forget	(Italy) Renzo Furlan (Czech Republic) Daniel Vacek (Romania) Adrian Voinea (Ukraine) Andrei Medvedev

=== March ===
Week	Tournament	Champions	Runners-up	Semifinalists	Quarterfinalists
4 Mar	Franklin Templeton Classic; Scottsdale, AZ, United States; World Series; Hard – $303,000 – 32S/16D; Singles – Doubles	(South Africa) Wayne Ferreira; 2–6, 6–3, 6–3	(Chile) Marcelo Ríos	(Spain) Alberto Berasategui (Australia) Sandon Stolle	(United States) Justin Gimelstob (United States) Richey Reneberg (Spain) Albert Costa (Sweden) Stefan Edberg
4 Mar	Franklin Templeton Classic; Scottsdale, AZ, United States; World Series; Hard – $303,000 – 32S/16D; Singles – Doubles	(United States) Patrick Galbraith (United States) Rick Leach; 5–7, 7–5, 7–5	(United States) Richey Reneberg (New Zealand) Brett Steven	(Spain) Alberto Berasategui (Australia) Sandon Stolle	(United States) Justin Gimelstob (United States) Richey Reneberg (Spain) Albert Costa (Sweden) Stefan Edberg
4 Mar	ABN AMRO World Tennis Tournament; Rotterdam, The Netherlands; World Series; Carpet (i) – $725,000 – 32S/16D; Singles – Doubles	(Croatia) Goran Ivanišević; 6–4, 3–6, 6–3	(Russia) Yevgeny Kafelnikov	(United Kingdom) Tim Henman (France) Guillaume Raoux	(United States) Pete Sampras (France) Cédric Pioline (Switzerland) Marc Rosset (Czech Republic) Martin Damm
4 Mar	ABN AMRO World Tennis Tournament; Rotterdam, The Netherlands; World Series; Carpet (i) – $725,000 – 32S/16D; Singles – Doubles	(South Africa) David Adams (South Africa) Marius Barnard; 6–3, 5–7, 7–6	(Netherlands) Hendrik Jan Davids (Czech Republic) Cyril Suk	(United Kingdom) Tim Henman (France) Guillaume Raoux	(United States) Pete Sampras (France) Cédric Pioline (Switzerland) Marc Rosset (Czech Republic) Martin Damm
4 Mar	Abierto Mexicano Telcel; Mexico City, Mexico; World Series; Clay – $305,000 – 32S/16D; Singles – Doubles	(Austria) Thomas Muster; 7–6^{(7–3)}, 6–2	(Czech Republic) Jiří Novák	(Spain) Francisco Clavet (Brazil) Fernando Meligeni	(Mexico) Alejandro Hernández (Argentina) Javier Frana (Spain) Javier Sánchez (Italy) Andrea Gaudenzi
4 Mar	Abierto Mexicano Telcel; Mexico City, Mexico; World Series; Clay – $305,000 – 32S/16D; Singles – Doubles	(United States) Donald Johnson (United States) Francisco Montana; 6–2, 6–4	(Venezuela) Nicolas Pereira (Spain) Emilio Sánchez	(Spain) Francisco Clavet (Brazil) Fernando Meligeni	(Mexico) Alejandro Hernández (Argentina) Javier Frana (Spain) Javier Sánchez (Italy) Andrea Gaudenzi
11 Mar	Copenhagen Open; Copenhagen, Denmark; World Series; Carpet (i) – $203,000 – 32S/16D; Singles – Doubles	(France) Cédric Pioline; 6–2, 7–6^{(9–7)}	(Denmark) Kenneth Carlsen	(United Kingdom) Tim Henman (Belgium) Johan Van Herck	(Germany) Martin Sinner (Sweden) Mikael Tillström (Belgium) Filip Dewulf (Sweden) Magnus Gustafsson
11 Mar	Copenhagen Open; Copenhagen, Denmark; World Series; Carpet (i) – $203,000 – 32S/16D; Singles – Doubles	(Belgium) Libor Pimek (South Africa) Byron Talbot; 7–6, 3–6, 6–3	(Australia) Wayne Arthurs (Australia) Andrew Kratzmann	(United Kingdom) Tim Henman (Belgium) Johan Van Herck	(Germany) Martin Sinner (Sweden) Mikael Tillström (Belgium) Filip Dewulf (Sweden) Magnus Gustafsson
11 Mar	Newsweek Champions Cup; Indian Wells, CA, United States; Super 9 Hard – $1,950,000 – 56S/28D; Singles – Doubles	(United States) Michael Chang; 7–5, 6–1, 6–1	(Netherlands) Paul Haarhuis	(Croatia) Goran Ivanišević (Chile) Marcelo Ríos	(United States) Pete Sampras (Spain) Carlos Costa (United States) Andre Agassi (South Africa) Wayne Ferreira
11 Mar	Newsweek Champions Cup; Indian Wells, CA, United States; Super 9 Hard – $1,950,000 – 56S/28D; Singles – Doubles	(Australia) Todd Woodbridge (Australia) Mark Woodforde; 6–3, 6–4	(United States) Brian MacPhie (Australia) Michael Tebbutt	(Croatia) Goran Ivanišević (Chile) Marcelo Ríos	(United States) Pete Sampras (Spain) Carlos Costa (United States) Andre Agassi (South Africa) Wayne Ferreira
18 Mar	St. Petersburg Open; Saint Petersburg, Russia; World Series; Carpet (i) – $300,000 – 32S/16D; Singles – Doubles	(Sweden) Magnus Gustafsson; 6–2, 7–6^{(7–4)}	(Russia) Yevgeny Kafelnikov	(Belgium) Filip Dewulf (Germany) Lars Burgsmüller	(United States) Jeff Tarango (Sweden) Mikael Tillström (Germany) David Prinosil (Czech Republic) Daniel Vacek
18 Mar	St. Petersburg Open; Saint Petersburg, Russia; World Series; Carpet (i) – $300,000 – 32S/16D; Singles – Doubles	(Russia) Yevgeny Kafelnikov (Russia) Andrei Olhovskiy; 6–3, 6–4	(Sweden) Nicklas Kulti (Sweden) Peter Nyborg	(Belgium) Filip Dewulf (Germany) Lars Burgsmüller	(United States) Jeff Tarango (Sweden) Mikael Tillström (Germany) David Prinosil (Czech Republic) Daniel Vacek
18 Mar	Lipton Championships; Key Biscayne, FL, United States; Super 9 Hard – $2,300,000 – 96S/48D; Singles – Doubles	(United States) Andre Agassi; 3–0 retired	(Croatia) Goran Ivanišević	(France) Arnaud Boetsch (United States) Pete Sampras	(United States) Jim Courier (United States) Michael Joyce (United States) Michael Chang (United States) Vincent Spadea
18 Mar	Lipton Championships; Key Biscayne, FL, United States; Super 9 Hard – $2,300,000 – 96S/48D; Singles – Doubles	(Australia) Todd Woodbridge (Australia) Mark Woodforde; 6–1, 6–3	(South Africa) Ellis Ferreira (United States) Patrick Galbraith	(France) Arnaud Boetsch (United States) Pete Sampras	(United States) Jim Courier (United States) Michael Joyce (United States) Michael Chang (United States) Vincent Spadea
25 Mar	Grand Prix Hassan II; Casablanca, Morocco; World Series; Clay – $203,000 – 32S/16D; Singles – Doubles	(Spain) Tomás Carbonell; 7–5, 1–6, 6–2	(Austria) Gilbert Schaller	(Spain) Alberto Berasategui (Russia) Andrei Chesnokov	(Australia) Richard Fromberg (Czech Republic) Jiří Novák (Sweden) Magnus Norman (Spain) Carlos Moyà
25 Mar	Grand Prix Hassan II; Casablanca, Morocco; World Series; Clay – $203,000 – 32S/16D; Singles – Doubles	(Czech Republic) Jiří Novák (Czech Republic) David Rikl; 7–6, 6–3	(Spain) Tomás Carbonell (Spain) Francisco Roig	(Spain) Alberto Berasategui (Russia) Andrei Chesnokov	(Australia) Richard Fromberg (Czech Republic) Jiří Novák (Sweden) Magnus Norman (Spain) Carlos Moyà

=== April ===
Week	Tournament	Champions	Runners-up	Semifinalists	Quarterfinalists
1 Apr	Davis Cup Quarterfinals; Rome, Italy – clay Limoges, France – clay (i); Calcutta, India – grass Prague, Czech Republic – carpet (i)	Quarterfinal winners Italy 4–1; France 5–0; Sweden 5–0; Czech Republic 3–2	Quarterfinal losers South Africa; Germany; India; United States		
8 Apr	Salem Open; Hong Kong, Hong Kong; World Series; Hard – $303,000 – 32S/16D; Singles – Doubles	(United States) Pete Sampras; 6–4, 3–6, 6–4	(United States) Michael Chang	(Netherlands) Jan Siemerink (Australia) Todd Woodbridge	(Germany) David Prinosil (Japan) Shuzo Matsuoka (Netherlands) Richard Krajicek (Czech Republic) Martin Damm
8 Apr	Salem Open; Hong Kong, Hong Kong; World Series; Hard – $303,000 – 32S/16D; Singles – Doubles	(United States) Patrick Galbraith (Russia) Andrei Olhovskiy; 6–3, 6–7, 7–6	(United States) Kent Kinnear (United States) Dave Randall	(Netherlands) Jan Siemerink (Australia) Todd Woodbridge	(Germany) David Prinosil (Japan) Shuzo Matsuoka (Netherlands) Richard Krajicek (Czech Republic) Martin Damm
8 Apr	Estoril Open; Oeiras, Portugal; World Series; Clay – $600,000 – 32S/16D; Singles – Doubles	(Austria) Thomas Muster; 7–6^{(7–4)}, 6–4	(Italy) Andrea Gaudenzi	(Spain) Àlex Corretja (Netherlands) Paul Haarhuis	(Spain) Francisco Clavet (Spain) Carlos Costa (Australia) Richard Fromberg (Spain) Tomás Carbonell
8 Apr	Estoril Open; Oeiras, Portugal; World Series; Clay – $600,000 – 32S/16D; Singles – Doubles	(Spain) Tomás Carbonell (Spain) Francisco Roig; 6–3, 6–2	(Netherlands) Tom Nijssen (United States) Greg Van Emburgh	(Spain) Àlex Corretja (Netherlands) Paul Haarhuis	(Spain) Francisco Clavet (Spain) Carlos Costa (Australia) Richard Fromberg (Spain) Tomás Carbonell
8 Apr	Gold Flake Open; New Delhi, India; World Series; Hard – $405,000 – 32S/16D; Singles – Doubles	(Sweden) Thomas Enqvist; 6–2, 7–6^{(7–3)}	(Zimbabwe) Byron Black	(United States) Jonathan Stark (Germany) Alex Rădulescu	(France) Jean-Philippe Fleurian (Australia) Sandon Stolle (Italy) Cristiano Caratti (France) Jérôme Golmard
8 Apr	Gold Flake Open; New Delhi, India; World Series; Hard – $405,000 – 32S/16D; Singles – Doubles	(Sweden) Jonas Björkman (Sweden) Nicklas Kulti; 4–6, 6–4, 6–4	(Zimbabwe) Byron Black (Australia) Sandon Stolle	(United States) Jonathan Stark (Germany) Alex Rădulescu	(France) Jean-Philippe Fleurian (Australia) Sandon Stolle (Italy) Cristiano Caratti (France) Jérôme Golmard
15 Apr	Trofeo Conde de Godó; Barcelona, Spain; Championship Series; Clay – $800,000 – 56S/28D; Singles – Doubles	(Austria) Thomas Muster; 6–3, 4–6, 6–4, 6–1	(Chile) Marcelo Ríos	(Spain) Carlos Moyà (United States) Jim Courier	(Spain) Francisco Roig (Spain) Alberto Berasategui (Sweden) Magnus Larsson (United States) Todd Martin
15 Apr	Trofeo Conde de Godó; Barcelona, Spain; Championship Series; Clay – $800,000 – 56S/28D; Singles – Doubles	(Argentina) Luis Lobo (Spain) Javier Sánchez; 6–1, 6–3	(United Kingdom) Neil Broad (South Africa) Piet Norval	(Spain) Carlos Moyà (United States) Jim Courier	(Spain) Francisco Roig (Spain) Alberto Berasategui (Sweden) Magnus Larsson (United States) Todd Martin
15 Apr	XL Bermuda Open; Bermuda, Bermuda; World Series; Clay – $303,000 – 32S/16D; Singles – Doubles	(United States) MaliVai Washington; 6–7^{(6–8)}, 6–4, 7–5	(Uruguay) Marcelo Filippini	(Argentina) Mariano Zabaleta (Argentina) Javier Frana	(United States) Bill Behrens (Germany) Dirk Dier (United States) Vincent Spadea (Sweden) Mats Wilander
15 Apr	XL Bermuda Open; Bermuda, Bermuda; World Series; Clay – $303,000 – 32S/16D; Singles – Doubles	(Sweden) Jan Apell (South Africa) Brent Haygarth; 3–6, 6–1, 6–3	(Australia) Pat Cash (Australia) Patrick Rafter	(Argentina) Mariano Zabaleta (Argentina) Javier Frana	(United States) Bill Behrens (Germany) Dirk Dier (United States) Vincent Spadea (Sweden) Mats Wilander
15 Apr	Japan Open Tennis Championships; Tokyo, Japan; Championship Series; Hard – $935,000 – 56S/28D; Singles – Doubles	(United States) Pete Sampras; 6–4, 7–5	(United States) Richey Reneberg	(Australia) Mark Woodforde (Germany) Hendrik Dreekmann	(France) Guy Forget (Sweden) Thomas Enqvist (Netherlands) Richard Krajicek (United States) Michael Chang
15 Apr	Japan Open Tennis Championships; Tokyo, Japan; Championship Series; Hard – $935,000 – 56S/28D; Singles – Doubles	(Australia) Todd Woodbridge (Australia) Mark Woodforde; 6–2, 6–3	(The Bahamas) Mark Knowles (United States) Rick Leach	(Australia) Mark Woodforde (Germany) Hendrik Dreekmann	(France) Guy Forget (Sweden) Thomas Enqvist (Netherlands) Richard Krajicek (United States) Michael Chang
22 Apr	Seoul Open; Seoul, South Korea; World Series; Hard – $203,000 – 32S/16D; Singles – Doubles	(Zimbabwe) Byron Black; 7–6^{(7–3)}, 6–3	(Czech Republic) Martin Damm	(United Kingdom) Tim Henman (Slovakia) Ján Krošlák	(Italy) Gianluca Pozzi (Japan) Shuzo Matsuoka (Uzbekistan) Oleg Ogorodov (United Kingdom) Greg Rusedski
22 Apr	Seoul Open; Seoul, South Korea; World Series; Hard – $203,000 – 32S/16D; Singles – Doubles	(United States) Rick Leach (United States) Jonathan Stark; 6–4, 6–4	(United States) Kent Kinnear (Zimbabwe) Kevin Ullyett	(United Kingdom) Tim Henman (Slovakia) Ján Krošlák	(Italy) Gianluca Pozzi (Japan) Shuzo Matsuoka (Uzbekistan) Oleg Ogorodov (United Kingdom) Greg Rusedski
22 Apr	Monte Carlo Open; Roquebrune-Cap-Martin, France; Super 9 Clay – $1,950,000 – 56S/28D; Singles – Doubles	(Austria) Thomas Muster; 6–3, 5–7, 4–6, 6–3, 6–2	(Spain) Albert Costa	(France) Cédric Pioline (Chile) Marcelo Ríos	(Netherlands) Sjeng Schalken (Spain) Carlos Costa (Sweden) Magnus Gustafsson (Spain) Félix Mantilla
22 Apr	Monte Carlo Open; Roquebrune-Cap-Martin, France; Super 9 Clay – $1,950,000 – 56S/28D; Singles – Doubles	(South Africa) Ellis Ferreira (Netherlands) Jan Siemerink; 2–6, 6–3, 6–2	(Sweden) Jonas Björkman (Sweden) Nicklas Kulti	(France) Cédric Pioline (Chile) Marcelo Ríos	(Netherlands) Sjeng Schalken (Spain) Carlos Costa (Sweden) Magnus Gustafsson (Spain) Félix Mantilla
29 Apr	AT&T Challenge; Atlanta, GA, United States; World Series; Clay – $303,000 – 32S/16D; Singles – Doubles	(Morocco) Karim Alami; 6–3, 6–4	(Sweden) Nicklas Kulti	(United States) Michael Chang (United States) Richey Reneberg	(Brazil) Fernando Meligeni (Argentina) Javier Frana (United States) Vincent Spadea (United States) Bryan Shelton
29 Apr	AT&T Challenge; Atlanta, GA, United States; World Series; Clay – $303,000 – 32S/16D; Singles – Doubles	(South Africa) Christo van Rensburg (United States) David Wheaton; 7–6, 6–2	(United States) Bill Behrens (United States) Matt Lucena	(United States) Michael Chang (United States) Richey Reneberg	(Brazil) Fernando Meligeni (Argentina) Javier Frana (United States) Vincent Spadea (United States) Bryan Shelton
29 Apr	Skoda Czech Open; Prague, Czech Republic; World Series; Clay – $340,000 – 32S/16D; Singles – Doubles	(Russia) Yevgeny Kafelnikov; 7–5, 1–6, 6–3	(Czech Republic) Bohdan Ulihrach	(Spain) Emilio Sánchez (Norway) Christian Ruud	(Spain) Alberto Martín (Czech Republic) Michal Tabara (Czech Republic) Daniel Vacek (Spain) Javier Sánchez
29 Apr	Skoda Czech Open; Prague, Czech Republic; World Series; Clay – $340,000 – 32S/16D; Singles – Doubles	(Russia) Yevgeny Kafelnikov (Czech Republic) Daniel Vacek; 6–3, 6–7, 6–3	(Argentina) Luis Lobo (Spain) Javier Sánchez	(Spain) Emilio Sánchez (Norway) Christian Ruud	(Spain) Alberto Martín (Czech Republic) Michal Tabara (Czech Republic) Daniel Vacek (Spain) Javier Sánchez
29 Apr	BMW Open; Munich, Germany; World Series; Clay – $400,000 – 32S/16D; Singles – Doubles	(Czech Republic) Slava Doseděl; 6–4, 4–6, 6–3	(Spain) Carlos Moyà	(Austria) Thomas Muster (Germany) Boris Becker	(Australia) Mark Philippoussis (Croatia) Goran Ivanišević (Argentina) Hernán Gumy (Germany) Bernd Karbacher
29 Apr	BMW Open; Munich, Germany; World Series; Clay – $400,000 – 32S/16D; Singles – Doubles	(South Africa) Lan Bale (Netherlands) Stephen Noteboom; 4–6, 7–6, 6–4	(France) Olivier Delaître (Italy) Diego Nargiso	(Austria) Thomas Muster (Germany) Boris Becker	(Australia) Mark Philippoussis (Croatia) Goran Ivanišević (Argentina) Hernán Gumy (Germany) Bernd Karbacher

=== May ===
Week	Tournament	Champions	Runners-up	Semifinalists	Quarterfinalists
6 May	Panasonic German Open; Hamburg, Germany; Super 9 Clay – $1,950,000 – 56S/28D; Singles – Doubles	(Spain) Roberto Carretero; 2–6, 6–4, 6–4, 6–4	(Spain) Àlex Corretja	(Russia) Yevgeny Kafelnikov (Chile) Marcelo Ríos	(Austria) Gilbert Schaller (Spain) Sergi Bruguera (South Africa) Wayne Ferreira (Sweden) Magnus Larsson
6 May	Panasonic German Open; Hamburg, Germany; Super 9 Clay – $1,950,000 – 56S/28D; Singles – Doubles	(The Bahamas) Mark Knowles (Canada) Daniel Nestor; 6–2, 6–4	(France) Guy Forget (Switzerland) Jakob Hlasek	(Russia) Yevgeny Kafelnikov (Chile) Marcelo Ríos	(Austria) Gilbert Schaller (Spain) Sergi Bruguera (South Africa) Wayne Ferreira (Sweden) Magnus Larsson
6 May	U.S. Men's Clay Court Championships; Pinehurst, NC, United States; World Series; Clay – $264,250 – 32S/16D; Singles – Doubles	(Brazil) Fernando Meligeni; 6–4, 6–2	(Sweden) Mats Wilander	(Argentina) Javier Frana (Australia) Jason Stoltenberg	(United States) Vincent Spadea (Sweden) Jonas Björkman (United States) Richey Reneberg (Australia) Patrick Rafter
6 May	U.S. Men's Clay Court Championships; Pinehurst, NC, United States; World Series; Clay – $264,250 – 32S/16D; Singles – Doubles	(Australia) Pat Cash (Australia) Patrick Rafter; 6–2, 6–3	(United States) Ken Flach (United States) David Wheaton	(Argentina) Javier Frana (Australia) Jason Stoltenberg	(United States) Vincent Spadea (Sweden) Jonas Björkman (United States) Richey Reneberg (Australia) Patrick Rafter
13 May	Italian Open; Rome, Italy; Super 9 Clay – $1,950,000 – 64S/32D; Singles – Doubles	(Austria) Thomas Muster; 6–2, 6–4, 3–6, 6–3	(Netherlands) Richard Krajicek	(Spain) Albert Costa (South Africa) Wayne Ferreira	(Chile) Marcelo Ríos (Italy) Andrea Gaudenzi (Ukraine) Andrei Medvedev (Sweden) Stefan Edberg
13 May	Italian Open; Rome, Italy; Super 9 Clay – $1,950,000 – 64S/32D; Singles – Doubles	(Zimbabwe) Byron Black (Canada) Grant Connell; 6–2, 6–3	(Belgium) Libor Pimek (South Africa) Byron Talbot	(Spain) Albert Costa (South Africa) Wayne Ferreira	(Chile) Marcelo Ríos (Italy) Andrea Gaudenzi (Ukraine) Andrei Medvedev (Sweden) Stefan Edberg
13 May	International Tennis Championships; Coral Springs, FL, United States; World Series; Clay – $245,000 – 32S/16D; Singles – Doubles	(Australia) Jason Stoltenberg; 7–6^{(7–4)}, 2–6, 7–5	(United States) Chris Woodruff	(Argentina) Javier Frana (Sweden) Magnus Gustafsson	(Australia) Richard Fromberg (Australia) Michael Tebbutt (United States) Vincent Spadea (Australia) Sandon Stolle
13 May	International Tennis Championships; Coral Springs, FL, United States; World Series; Clay – $245,000 – 32S/16D; Singles – Doubles	(Australia) Todd Woodbridge (Australia) Mark Woodforde; 6–3, 6–3	(United States) Ivan Baron (United States) Brett Hansen-Dent	(Argentina) Javier Frana (Sweden) Magnus Gustafsson	(Australia) Richard Fromberg (Australia) Michael Tebbutt (United States) Vincent Spadea (Australia) Sandon Stolle
20 May	St. Pölten Open; St. Pölten, Austria; World Series; Clay – $400,000 – 32S/16D; Singles – Doubles	(Chile) Marcelo Ríos; 6–2, 6–4	(Spain) Félix Mantilla	(Italy) Andrea Gaudenzi (Czech Republic) Slava Doseděl	(Austria) Thomas Muster (Denmark) Kenneth Carlsen (Sweden) Stefan Edberg (Spain) Francisco Clavet
20 May	St. Pölten Open; St. Pölten, Austria; World Series; Clay – $400,000 – 32S/16D; Singles – Doubles	(Czech Republic) Slava Doseděl (Czech Republic) Pavel Vízner; 6–7, 6–4, 6–3	(South Africa) David Adams (Netherlands) Menno Oosting	(Italy) Andrea Gaudenzi (Czech Republic) Slava Doseděl	(Austria) Thomas Muster (Denmark) Kenneth Carlsen (Sweden) Stefan Edberg (Spain) Francisco Clavet
20 May	World Team Cup; Düsseldorf, Germany – clay	(Switzerland) Switzerland; 2–1	Czech Republic		
27 May; 3 Jun	French Open; Paris, France; Grand Slam; Clay – $5,125,107 – 128S/64D/32X; Singles – Doubles; Mixed doubles	(Russia) Yevgeny Kafelnikov; 7–6^{(7–4)}, 7–5, 7–6^{(7–4)}	(Germany) Michael Stich	(United States) Pete Sampras (Switzerland) Marc Rosset	(United States) Jim Courier (Netherlands) Richard Krajicek (Germany) Bernd Karbacher (France) Cédric Pioline
27 May; 3 Jun	French Open; Paris, France; Grand Slam; Clay – $5,125,107 – 128S/64D/32X; Singles – Doubles; Mixed doubles	(Russia) Yevgeny Kafelnikov (Czech Republic) Daniel Vacek; 6–2, 6–3	(France) Guy Forget (Switzerland) Jakob Hlasek	(United States) Pete Sampras (Switzerland) Marc Rosset	(United States) Jim Courier (Netherlands) Richard Krajicek (Germany) Bernd Karbacher (France) Cédric Pioline
27 May; 3 Jun	French Open; Paris, France; Grand Slam; Clay – $5,125,107 – 128S/64D/32X; Singles – Doubles; Mixed doubles	(Argentina) Patricia Tarabini (Argentina) Javier Frana; 6–2, 6–2	(United States) Nicole Arendt (United States) Luke Jensen	(United States) Pete Sampras (Switzerland) Marc Rosset	(United States) Jim Courier (Netherlands) Richard Krajicek (Germany) Bernd Karbacher (France) Cédric Pioline

=== June ===
Week	Tournament	Champions	Runners-up	Semifinalists	Quarterfinalists
10 Jun	Wilkinson Championships; Rosmalen, The Netherlands; World Series; Grass – $475,000 – 32S/16D; Singles – Doubles	(United States) Richey Reneberg; 6–4, 6–0	(France) Stephane Simian	(Netherlands) Paul Haarhuis (Sweden) Jonas Björkman	(India) Leander Paes (Netherlands) Richard Krajicek (Netherlands) Jan Siemerink (Denmark) Frederik Fetterlein
10 Jun	Wilkinson Championships; Rosmalen, The Netherlands; World Series; Grass – $475,000 – 32S/16D; Singles – Doubles	(Australia) Paul Kilderry (Czech Republic) Pavel Vízner; 7–5, 6–3	(Sweden) Anders Järryd (Canada) Daniel Nestor	(Netherlands) Paul Haarhuis (Sweden) Jonas Björkman	(India) Leander Paes (Netherlands) Richard Krajicek (Netherlands) Jan Siemerink (Denmark) Frederik Fetterlein
10 Jun	Oporto Open; Porto, Portugal; World Series; Clay – $400,000 – 32S/16D; Singles – Doubles	(Spain) Félix Mantilla; 6–7^{(5–7)}, 6–4, 6–3	(Argentina) Hernán Gumy	(Spain) Carlos Moyà (Norway) Christian Ruud	(Belgium) Johan Van Herck (Spain) Tomás Carbonell (Italy) Stefano Pescosolido (Australia) Richard Fromberg
10 Jun	Oporto Open; Porto, Portugal; World Series; Clay – $400,000 – 32S/16D; Singles – Doubles	(Portugal) Emanuel Couto (Portugal) Bernardo Mota; 4–6, 6–4, 6–4	(Australia) Joshua Eagle (Australia) Andrew Florent	(Spain) Carlos Moyà (Norway) Christian Ruud	(Belgium) Johan Van Herck (Spain) Tomás Carbonell (Italy) Stefano Pescosolido (Australia) Richard Fromberg
10 Jun	Stella Artois Championships; London, Great Britain; World Series; Grass – $675,000 – 32S/16D; Singles – Doubles	(Germany) Boris Becker; 6–4, 7–6^{(7–3)}	(Sweden) Stefan Edberg	(Austria) Thomas Muster (South Africa) Wayne Ferreira	(Australia) Mark Woodforde (United States) Todd Martin (Germany) Michael Stich (Australia) Patrick Rafter
10 Jun	Stella Artois Championships; London, Great Britain; World Series; Grass – $675,000 – 32S/16D; Singles – Doubles	(Australia) Todd Woodbridge (Australia) Mark Woodforde; 6–3, 7–6	(Canada) Sébastien Lareau (United States) Alex O'Brien	(Austria) Thomas Muster (South Africa) Wayne Ferreira	(Australia) Mark Woodforde (United States) Todd Martin (Germany) Michael Stich (Australia) Patrick Rafter
17 Jun	Internazionali di Carisbo; Bologna, Italy; World Series; Clay – $303,000 – 32S/16D; Singles – Doubles	(Spain) Alberto Berasategui; 6–3, 6–4	(Spain) Carlos Costa	(Czech Republic) Bohdan Ulihrach (Spain) Francisco Clavet	(Venezuela) Jimy Szymanski (Spain) Javier Sánchez (Russia) Andrei Chesnokov (Morocco) Karim Alami
17 Jun	Internazionali di Carisbo; Bologna, Italy; World Series; Clay – $303,000 – 32S/16D; Singles – Doubles	(South Africa) Brent Haygarth (South Africa) Christo van Rensburg; 6–1, 6–4	(Morocco) Karim Alami (Hungary) Gábor Köves	(Czech Republic) Bohdan Ulihrach (Spain) Francisco Clavet	(Venezuela) Jimy Szymanski (Spain) Javier Sánchez (Russia) Andrei Chesnokov (Morocco) Karim Alami
17 Jun	Gerry Weber Open; Halle, Germany; World Series; Grass – $875,000 – 32S/16D; Singles – Doubles	(Sweden) Nicklas Kulti; 6–7^{(5–7)}, 6–3, 6–4	(Russia) Yevgeny Kafelnikov	(United States) Richey Reneberg (Czech Republic) Daniel Vacek	(New Zealand) Brett Steven (United States) Jim Courier (Sweden) Magnus Gustafsson (Sweden) Magnus Larsson
17 Jun	Gerry Weber Open; Halle, Germany; World Series; Grass – $875,000 – 32S/16D; Singles – Doubles	(Zimbabwe) Byron Black (Canada) Grant Connell; 6–1, 7–5	(Russia) Yevgeny Kafelnikov (Czech Republic) Daniel Vacek	(United States) Richey Reneberg (Czech Republic) Daniel Vacek	(New Zealand) Brett Steven (United States) Jim Courier (Sweden) Magnus Gustafsson (Sweden) Magnus Larsson
17 Jun	Nottingham Open; Nottingham, Great Britain; World Series; Grass – $303,000 – 32S/16D; Singles – Doubles	(Netherlands) Jan Siemerink; 6–3, 7–6^{(7–0)}	(Australia) Sandon Stolle	(Australia) Todd Woodbridge (United Kingdom) Greg Rusedski	(United Kingdom) Mark Petchey (United States) Vincent Spadea (United Kingdom) Tim Henman (Japan) Shuzo Matsuoka
17 Jun	Nottingham Open; Nottingham, Great Britain; World Series; Grass – $303,000 – 32S/16D; Singles – Doubles	(United Kingdom) Mark Petchey (United Kingdom) Danny Sapsford; 6–7, 7–6, 6–4	(United Kingdom) Neil Broad (South Africa) Piet Norval	(Australia) Todd Woodbridge (United Kingdom) Greg Rusedski	(United Kingdom) Mark Petchey (United States) Vincent Spadea (United Kingdom) Tim Henman (Japan) Shuzo Matsuoka
24 Jun; 1 Jul	The Championships, Wimbledon; London, Great Britain; Grand Slam; Grass – $4,736,161 – 128S/64D/32X; Singles – Doubles; Mixed doubles	(Netherlands) Richard Krajicek; 6–3, 6–4, 6–3	(United States) MaliVai Washington	(Australia) Jason Stoltenberg (United States) Todd Martin	(United States) Pete Sampras (Croatia) Goran Ivanišević (United Kingdom) Tim Henman (Germany) Alex Rădulescu
24 Jun; 1 Jul	The Championships, Wimbledon; London, Great Britain; Grand Slam; Grass – $4,736,161 – 128S/64D/32X; Singles – Doubles; Mixed doubles	(Australia) Mark Woodforde (Australia) Todd Woodbridge; 4–6, 6–1, 6–3, 6–2	(Zimbabwe) Byron Black (Canada) Grant Connell	(Australia) Jason Stoltenberg (United States) Todd Martin	(United States) Pete Sampras (Croatia) Goran Ivanišević (United Kingdom) Tim Henman (Germany) Alex Rădulescu
24 Jun; 1 Jul	The Championships, Wimbledon; London, Great Britain; Grand Slam; Grass – $4,736,161 – 128S/64D/32X; Singles – Doubles; Mixed doubles	(Czech Republic) Helena Suková (Czech Republic) Cyril Suk; 1–6, 6–3, 6–2	(Latvia) Larisa Savchenko-Neiland (Australia) Mark Woodforde	(Australia) Jason Stoltenberg (United States) Todd Martin	(United States) Pete Sampras (Croatia) Goran Ivanišević (United Kingdom) Tim Henman (Germany) Alex Rădulescu

=== July ===
Week	Tournament	Champions	Runners-up	Semifinalists	Quarterfinalists
8 Jul	Rado Open; Gstaad, Switzerland; World Series; Clay – $525,000 – 32S/16D; Singles – Doubles	(Spain) Albert Costa; 4–6, 7–6^{(7–2)}, 6–1, 6–0	(Spain) Félix Mantilla	(Russia) Yevgeny Kafelnikov (Czech Republic) Bohdan Ulihrach	(Spain) Francisco Clavet (Italy) Renzo Furlan (Spain) Sergi Bruguera (Spain) Alberto Berasategui
8 Jul	Rado Open; Gstaad, Switzerland; World Series; Clay – $525,000 – 32S/16D; Singles – Doubles	(Czech Republic) Jiří Novák (Czech Republic) Pavel Vízner; 4–6, 7–6, 7–6	(United States) Trevor Kronemann (Australia) David Macpherson	(Russia) Yevgeny Kafelnikov (Czech Republic) Bohdan Ulihrach	(Spain) Francisco Clavet (Italy) Renzo Furlan (Spain) Sergi Bruguera (Spain) Alberto Berasategui
8 Jul	Hall of Fame Tennis Championships; Newport, RI, United States; World Series; Grass – $230,000 – 32S/16D; Singles – Doubles	(Venezuela) Nicolas Pereira; 4–6, 6–4, 6–4	(South Africa) Grant Stafford	(India) Leander Paes (Canada) Daniel Nestor	(Zimbabwe) Byron Black (Russia) Andrei Olhovskiy (South Africa) Marcos Ondruska (South Africa) David Nainkin
8 Jul	Hall of Fame Tennis Championships; Newport, RI, United States; World Series; Grass – $230,000 – 32S/16D; Singles – Doubles	(South Africa) Marius Barnard (South Africa) Piet Norval; 6–7, 6–4, 6–4	(Australia) Paul Kilderry (Australia) Michael Tebbutt	(India) Leander Paes (Canada) Daniel Nestor	(Zimbabwe) Byron Black (Russia) Andrei Olhovskiy (South Africa) Marcos Ondruska (South Africa) David Nainkin
8 Jul	Investor Swedish Open; Båstad, Sweden; World Series $303,000 – clay – 32S/16D; Singles – Doubles	(Sweden) Magnus Gustafsson; 6–1, 6–3	(Ukraine) Andrei Medvedev	(Sweden) Stefan Edberg (Spain) Carlos Costa	(Sweden) Thomas Johansson (Spain) Tomás Carbonell (Spain) Galo Blanco (Sweden) Magnus Larsson
8 Jul	Investor Swedish Open; Båstad, Sweden; World Series $303,000 – clay – 32S/16D; Singles – Doubles	(Sweden) David Ekerot (United States) Jeff Tarango; 6–4, 3–6, 6–4	(Australia) Joshua Eagle (Sweden) Peter Nyborg	(Sweden) Stefan Edberg (Spain) Carlos Costa	(Sweden) Thomas Johansson (Spain) Tomás Carbonell (Spain) Galo Blanco (Sweden) Magnus Larsson
15 Jul	Mercedes Cup; Stuttgart, Germany; Championship Series; Clay – $915,000 – 48S/24D; Singles – Doubles	(Austria) Thomas Muster; 6–2, 6–2, 6–4	(Russia) Yevgeny Kafelnikov	(Spain) Alberto Berasategui (Spain) Àlex Corretja	(Spain) Francisco Clavet (Germany) Marc-Kevin Goellner (Russia) Alexander Volkov (Spain) Félix Mantilla
15 Jul	Mercedes Cup; Stuttgart, Germany; Championship Series; Clay – $915,000 – 48S/24D; Singles – Doubles	(Belgium) Libor Pimek (South Africa) Byron Talbot; 6–2, 5–7, 6–4	(Spain) Tomás Carbonell (Spain) Francisco Roig	(Spain) Alberto Berasategui (Spain) Àlex Corretja	(Spain) Francisco Clavet (Germany) Marc-Kevin Goellner (Russia) Alexander Volkov (Spain) Félix Mantilla
15 Jul	Legg Mason Tennis Classic; Washington, D.C., United; Championship Series; Hard – $550,000 – 56S/28D; Singles – Doubles	(United States) Michael Chang; 6–2, 6–4	(South Africa) Wayne Ferreira	(Italy) Renzo Furlan (Denmark) Kenneth Carlsen	(Australia) Patrick Rafter (United States) Richey Reneberg (South Africa) Neville Godwin (Netherlands) Paul Haarhuis
15 Jul	Legg Mason Tennis Classic; Washington, D.C., United; Championship Series; Hard – $550,000 – 56S/28D; Singles – Doubles	(Canada) Grant Connell (United States) Scott Davis; 7–6, 3–6, 6–3	(United States) Doug Flach (United States) Chris Woodruff	(Italy) Renzo Furlan (Denmark) Kenneth Carlsen	(Australia) Patrick Rafter (United States) Richey Reneberg (South Africa) Neville Godwin (Netherlands) Paul Haarhuis
22 Jul	Summer Olympic Games; Atlanta, GA, United States; Olympics; Hard; Singles – Doubles	Gold (United States) Andre Agassi; 6–2, 6–3, 6–1	Silver (Spain) Sergi Bruguera	Bronze (India) Leander Paes (Brazil) Fernando Meligeni	(South Africa) Wayne Ferreira (Italy) Renzo Furlan (United States) MaliVai Washington (Russia) Andrei Olhovskiy
22 Jul	Summer Olympic Games; Atlanta, GA, United States; Olympics; Hard; Singles – Doubles	(Australia) Mark Woodforde (Australia) Todd Woodbridge; 6–4, 6–4, 6–2	(United Kingdom) Neil Broad (United Kingdom) Tim Henman	Bronze (India) Leander Paes (Brazil) Fernando Meligeni	(South Africa) Wayne Ferreira (Italy) Renzo Furlan (United States) MaliVai Washington (Russia) Andrei Olhovskiy
22 Jul	EA Generali Open; Kitzbühel, Austria; World Series; Clay – $400,000 – 48S/24D; Singles – Doubles	(Spain) Alberto Berasategui; 6–2, 6–4, 6–4	(Spain) Àlex Corretja	(Spain) Emilio Benfele Álvarez (Spain) Juan Albert Viloca	(Austria) Thomas Muster (Argentina) Franco Squillari (Belgium) Filip Dewulf (Germany) Nicolas Kiefer
22 Jul	EA Generali Open; Kitzbühel, Austria; World Series; Clay – $400,000 – 48S/24D; Singles – Doubles	(Belgium) Libor Pimek (South Africa) Byron Talbot; 7–6, 6–3	(South Africa) David Adams (Netherlands) Menno Oosting	(Spain) Emilio Benfele Álvarez (Spain) Juan Albert Viloca	(Austria) Thomas Muster (Argentina) Franco Squillari (Belgium) Filip Dewulf (Germany) Nicolas Kiefer
29 Jul	Dutch Open; Amsterdam, The Netherlands; World Series; Clay – $475,000 – 32S/16D; Singles – Doubles	(Spain) Francisco Clavet; 7–5, 6–1, 6–1	(Morocco) Younes El Aynaoui	(Romania) Adrian Voinea (Netherlands) Dennis van Scheppingen	(Czech Republic) Slava Doseděl (Spain) Félix Mantilla (Spain) Carlos Moyà (Argentina) Hernán Gumy
29 Jul	Dutch Open; Amsterdam, The Netherlands; World Series; Clay – $475,000 – 32S/16D; Singles – Doubles	(United States) Donald Johnson (United States) Francisco Montana; 6–4, 3–6, 6–2	(Sweden) Rikard Bergh (United States) Jack Waite	(Romania) Adrian Voinea (Netherlands) Dennis van Scheppingen	(Czech Republic) Slava Doseděl (Spain) Félix Mantilla (Spain) Carlos Moyà (Argentina) Hernán Gumy
29 Jul	Infiniti Open; Los Angeles, CA, United States; World Series; Hard – $303,000 – 32S/16D; Singles – Doubles	(United States) Michael Chang; 6–4, 6–3	(Netherlands) Richard Krajicek	(Sweden) Stefan Edberg (Australia) Sandon Stolle	(Italy) Stefano Pescosolido (Australia) Scott Draper (United States) Alex O'Brien (Sweden) Jonas Björkman
29 Jul	Infiniti Open; Los Angeles, CA, United States; World Series; Hard – $303,000 – 32S/16D; Singles – Doubles	(South Africa) Marius Barnard (South Africa) Piet Norval; 7–5, 6–2	(Sweden) Jonas Björkman (Sweden) Nicklas Kulti	(Sweden) Stefan Edberg (Australia) Sandon Stolle	(Italy) Stefano Pescosolido (Australia) Scott Draper (United States) Alex O'Brien (Sweden) Jonas Björkman

=== August ===
Week	Tournament	Champions	Runners-up	Semifinalists	Quarterfinalists
5 Aug	San Marino Open; San Marino, San Marino; World Series; Clay – $275,000 – 32S/16D; Singles – Doubles	(Spain) Albert Costa; 7–6^{(9–7)}, 6–3	(Spain) Félix Mantilla	(Argentina) Marcelo Charpentier (Spain) Javier Sánchez	(Romania) Adrian Voinea (Austria) Gilbert Schaller (Norway) Christian Ruud (Czech Republic) Slava Doseděl
5 Aug	San Marino Open; San Marino, San Marino; World Series; Clay – $275,000 – 32S/16D; Singles – Doubles	(Argentina) Pablo Albano (Argentina) Lucas Arnold Ker; 6–1, 6–3	(Argentina) Mariano Hood (Argentina) Sebastián Prieto	(Argentina) Marcelo Charpentier (Spain) Javier Sánchez	(Romania) Adrian Voinea (Austria) Gilbert Schaller (Norway) Christian Ruud (Czech Republic) Slava Doseděl
5 Aug	Great American Insurance ATP Championships; Mason, OH, United States; Super 9 Hard – $1,950,000 – 56S/28D; Singles – Doubles	(United States) Andre Agassi; 7–6^{(7–4)}, 6–4	(United States) Michael Chang	(Sweden) Thomas Enqvist (Austria) Thomas Muster	(United States) Pete Sampras (Croatia) Goran Ivanišević (Russia) Yevgeny Kafelnikov (South Africa) Wayne Ferreira
5 Aug	Great American Insurance ATP Championships; Mason, OH, United States; Super 9 Hard – $1,950,000 – 56S/28D; Singles – Doubles	(The Bahamas) Mark Knowles (Canada) Daniel Nestor; 3–6, 6–3, 6–4	(Australia) Sandon Stolle (Czech Republic) Cyril Suk	(Sweden) Thomas Enqvist (Austria) Thomas Muster	(United States) Pete Sampras (Croatia) Goran Ivanišević (Russia) Yevgeny Kafelnikov (South Africa) Wayne Ferreira
12 Aug	RCA Championships; Indianapolis, IN, United States; Championship Series; Hard – $915,000 – 56S/28D; Singles – Doubles	(United States) Pete Sampras; 7–6^{(7–3)}, 7–5	(Croatia) Goran Ivanišević	(Czech Republic) Bohdan Ulihrach (United States) Todd Martin	(Germany) Tommy Haas (Spain) Àlex Corretja (Sweden) Thomas Enqvist (France) Lionel Roux
12 Aug	RCA Championships; Indianapolis, IN, United States; Championship Series; Hard – $915,000 – 56S/28D; Singles – Doubles	(United States) Jim Grabb (United States) Richey Reneberg; 7–6, 4–6, 6–4	(Czech Republic) Petr Korda (Czech Republic) Cyril Suk	(Czech Republic) Bohdan Ulihrach (United States) Todd Martin	(Germany) Tommy Haas (Spain) Àlex Corretja (Sweden) Thomas Enqvist (France) Lionel Roux
12 Aug	Pilot Pen International; New Haven, CT, United States; Championship Series; Hard – $915,000 – 56S/28D; Singles – Doubles	(United States) Alex O'Brien; 7–6^{(8–6)}, 6–4	(Netherlands) Jan Siemerink	(Australia) Mark Philippoussis (South Africa) Wayne Ferreira	(Russia) Yevgeny Kafelnikov (Switzerland) Marc Rosset (Czech Republic) Daniel Vacek (Netherlands) Richard Krajicek
12 Aug	Pilot Pen International; New Haven, CT, United States; Championship Series; Hard – $915,000 – 56S/28D; Singles – Doubles	(Zimbabwe) Byron Black (Canada) Grant Connell; 6–4, 6–4	(Sweden) Jonas Björkman (Sweden) Nicklas Kulti	(Australia) Mark Philippoussis (South Africa) Wayne Ferreira	(Russia) Yevgeny Kafelnikov (Switzerland) Marc Rosset (Czech Republic) Daniel Vacek (Netherlands) Richard Krajicek
12 Aug	Croatia Open Umag; Umag, Croatia; World Series; Clay – $375,000 – 32S/16D; Singles – Doubles	(Spain) Carlos Moyà; 6–0, 7–6^{(7–4)}	(Spain) Félix Mantilla	(Czech Republic) Slava Doseděl (Norway) Christian Ruud	(Spain) Albert Costa (Austria) Gilbert Schaller (Spain) Marcos Aurelio Gorriz (Brazil) Gustavo Kuerten
12 Aug	Croatia Open Umag; Umag, Croatia; World Series; Clay – $375,000 – 32S/16D; Singles – Doubles	(Argentina) Pablo Albano (Argentina) Luis Lobo; 6–4, 6–1	(Latvia) Ģirts Dzelde (Austria) Udo Plamberger	(Czech Republic) Slava Doseděl (Norway) Christian Ruud	(Spain) Albert Costa (Austria) Gilbert Schaller (Spain) Marcos Aurelio Gorriz (Brazil) Gustavo Kuerten
19 Aug	Genovese Hamlet Cup; Long Island, NY, United States; World Series; Hard – $225,000 – 32S/16D; Singles – Doubles	(Ukraine) Andrei Medvedev; 7–5, 6–3	(Czech Republic) Martin Damm	(Slovakia) Karol Kučera (Romania) Adrian Voinea	(United States) Michael Chang (United States) Jonathan Stark (United States) Michael Joyce (Sweden) Thomas Johansson
19 Aug	Genovese Hamlet Cup; Long Island, NY, United States; World Series; Hard – $225,000 – 32S/16D; Singles – Doubles	(United States) Luke Jensen (United States) Murphy Jensen; 6–3, 7–6	(Germany) Hendrik Dreekmann (Russia) Alexander Vladimirovich Volkov	(Slovakia) Karol Kučera (Romania) Adrian Voinea	(United States) Michael Chang (United States) Jonathan Stark (United States) Michael Joyce (Sweden) Thomas Johansson
19 Aug	du Maurier Open; Toronto, Canada; Super 9 Hard – $1,750,000 – 56S/28D; Singles – Doubles	(South Africa) Wayne Ferreira; 6–2, 6–4	(Australia) Todd Woodbridge	(Chile) Marcelo Ríos (United States) Todd Martin	(Australia) Mark Philippoussis (Australia) Patrick Rafter (Sweden) Thomas Enqvist (United States) Alex O'Brien
19 Aug	du Maurier Open; Toronto, Canada; Super 9 Hard – $1,750,000 – 56S/28D; Singles – Doubles	(United States) Patrick Galbraith (Netherlands) Paul Haarhuis; 6–3, 7–5	(The Bahamas) Mark Knowles (Canada) Daniel Nestor	(Chile) Marcelo Ríos (United States) Todd Martin	(Australia) Mark Philippoussis (Australia) Patrick Rafter (Sweden) Thomas Enqvist (United States) Alex O'Brien
26 Aug; 2 Sep	US Open; New York City, NY, United States; Grand Slam; Hard – $4,806,000 – 128S/64D; Singles – Doubles – Mixed doubles	(United States) Pete Sampras; 6–1, 6–4, 7–6^{(7–3)}	(United States) Michael Chang	(Croatia) Goran Ivanišević (United States) Andre Agassi	(Spain) Àlex Corretja (Sweden) Stefan Edberg (Austria) Thomas Muster (Spain) Javier Sánchez
26 Aug; 2 Sep	US Open; New York City, NY, United States; Grand Slam; Hard – $4,806,000 – 128S/64D; Singles – Doubles – Mixed doubles	(Australia) Mark Woodforde (Australia) Todd Woodbridge; 4–6, 7–6, 7–6	(Netherlands) Jacco Eltingh (Netherlands) Paul Haarhuis	(Croatia) Goran Ivanišević (United States) Andre Agassi	(Spain) Àlex Corretja (Sweden) Stefan Edberg (Austria) Thomas Muster (Spain) Javier Sánchez
26 Aug; 2 Sep	US Open; New York City, NY, United States; Grand Slam; Hard – $4,806,000 – 128S/64D; Singles – Doubles – Mixed doubles	(United States) Lisa Raymond (United States) Patrick Galbraith; 7–6, 7–6	(Netherlands) Manon Bollegraf (United States) Rick Leach	(Croatia) Goran Ivanišević (United States) Andre Agassi	(Spain) Àlex Corretja (Sweden) Stefan Edberg (Austria) Thomas Muster (Spain) Javier Sánchez

=== September ===
Week	Tournament	Champions	Runners-up	Semifinalists	Quarterfinalists
9 Sep	Cerveza Club Colombia Open; Bogotá, Colombia; World Series; Clay – $303,000 – 32S/16D; Singles – Doubles	(Austria) Thomas Muster; 6–7^{(6–8)}, 6–2, 6–3	(Ecuador) Nicolás Lapentti	(Argentina) Lucas Arnold Ker (Colombia) Mauricio Hadad	(Paraguay) Ramón Delgado (Israel) Eyal Ran (Mexico) Alejandro Hernández (Netherlands) Sjeng Schalken
9 Sep	Cerveza Club Colombia Open; Bogotá, Colombia; World Series; Clay – $303,000 – 32S/16D; Singles – Doubles	(Venezuela) Nicolas Pereira (Czech Republic) David Rikl; 6–3, 7–6	(Ecuador) Pablo Campana (Ecuador) Nicolás Lapentti	(Argentina) Lucas Arnold Ker (Colombia) Mauricio Hadad	(Paraguay) Ramón Delgado (Israel) Eyal Ran (Mexico) Alejandro Hernández (Netherlands) Sjeng Schalken
9 Sep	Romanian Open; Bucharest, Romania; World Series; Clay – $475,000 – 32S/16D; Singles – Doubles	(Spain) Alberto Berasategui; 6–1, 7–6^{(7–5)}	(Spain) Carlos Moyà	(Norway) Christian Ruud (Romania) Andrei Pavel	(Romania) Dinu Pescariu (Romania) Ion Moldovan (Spain) Francisco Clavet (Czech Republic) Jiří Novák
9 Sep	Romanian Open; Bucharest, Romania; World Series; Clay – $475,000 – 32S/16D; Singles – Doubles	(Sweden) David Ekerot (United States) Jeff Tarango; 7–6, 7–6	(South Africa) David Adams (Netherlands) Menno Oosting	(Norway) Christian Ruud (Romania) Andrei Pavel	(Romania) Dinu Pescariu (Romania) Ion Moldovan (Spain) Francisco Clavet (Czech Republic) Jiří Novák
9 Sep	Bournemouth International; Bournemouth, Great Britain; World Series; Clay – $375,000 – 32S/16D; Singles – Doubles	(Spain) Albert Costa; 6–7^{(4–7)}, 6–2, 6–2	(Germany) Marc-Kevin Goellner	(Sweden) Magnus Norman (Australia) Jason Stoltenberg	(United Kingdom) Danny Sapsford (Spain) Sergi Bruguera (United Kingdom) Greg Rusedski (Argentina) Mariano Zabaleta
9 Sep	Bournemouth International; Bournemouth, Great Britain; World Series; Clay – $375,000 – 32S/16D; Singles – Doubles	(Germany) Marc-Kevin Goellner (United Kingdom) Greg Rusedski; 6–3, 7–6	(France) Rodolphe Gilbert (Portugal) Nuno Marques	(Sweden) Magnus Norman (Australia) Jason Stoltenberg	(United Kingdom) Danny Sapsford (Spain) Sergi Bruguera (United Kingdom) Greg Rusedski (Argentina) Mariano Zabaleta
16 Sep	Davis Cup Semifinals; Nantes, France – carpet (i); Prague, Czech Republic – carpet (i)	Semifinal winners France 3–2; Sweden 4–1	Semifinal losers Italy; Czech Republic		
23 Sep	Davidoff Swiss Indoors; Basel, Switzerland; World Series; Hard (i) – $975,000 – 32S/16D; Singles – Doubles	(United States) Pete Sampras; 7–5, 6–2, 6–0	(Germany) Hendrik Dreekmann	(Russia) Yevgeny Kafelnikov (Czech Republic) Jiří Novák	(Sweden) Mikael Tillström (Germany) Marc-Kevin Goellner (France) Olivier Delaître (Czech Republic) Petr Korda
23 Sep	Davidoff Swiss Indoors; Basel, Switzerland; World Series; Hard (i) – $975,000 – 32S/16D; Singles – Doubles	(Russia) Yevgeny Kafelnikov (Czech Republic) Daniel Vacek; 6–3, 6–4	(South Africa) David Adams (Netherlands) Menno Oosting	(Russia) Yevgeny Kafelnikov (Czech Republic) Jiří Novák	(Sweden) Mikael Tillström (Germany) Marc-Kevin Goellner (France) Olivier Delaître (Czech Republic) Petr Korda
23 Sep	Campionati Internazionali di Sicilia; Palermo, Italy; World Series; Clay – $303,000 – 32S/16D; Singles – Doubles	(Morocco) Karim Alami; 7–5, 2–1 retired	(Romania) Adrian Voinea	(Belgium) Johan Van Herck (Italy) Marzio Martelli	(Morocco) Hicham Arazi (Spain) Àlex Corretja (Spain) Francisco Clavet (Spain) Jordi Burillo
23 Sep	Campionati Internazionali di Sicilia; Palermo, Italy; World Series; Clay – $303,000 – 32S/16D; Singles – Doubles	(Australia) Andrew Kratzmann (South Africa) Marcos Ondruska; 7–6, 6–4	(Italy) Cristian Brandi (Spain) Emilio Sánchez	(Belgium) Johan Van Herck (Italy) Marzio Martelli	(Morocco) Hicham Arazi (Spain) Àlex Corretja (Spain) Francisco Clavet (Spain) Jordi Burillo
30 Sep	Singapore Open; Singapore, Singapore; World Series $389,250; Singles – Doubles	(United States) Jonathan Stark; 6–4, 6–4	(United States) Michael Chang	(United Kingdom) Greg Rusedski (Sweden) Thomas Johansson	(Argentina) Javier Frana (Russia) Andrei Olhovskiy (Germany) Martin Sinner (Netherlands) Richard Krajicek
30 Sep	Singapore Open; Singapore, Singapore; World Series $389,250; Singles – Doubles	(Australia) Mark Woodforde (Australia) Todd Woodbridge; 7–6, 7–6	(Czech Republic) Martin Damm (Russia) Andrei Olhovskiy	(United Kingdom) Greg Rusedski (Sweden) Thomas Johansson	(Argentina) Javier Frana (Russia) Andrei Olhovskiy (Germany) Martin Sinner (Netherlands) Richard Krajicek
30 Sep	Grand Prix de Tennis de Lyon; Lyon, France; World Series carpet (i) – $725,000 – 32S/16D; Singles – Doubles	(Russia) Yevgeny Kafelnikov; 7–5, 6–3	(France) Arnaud Boetsch	(Sweden) Thomas Enqvist (United Kingdom) Tim Henman	(France) Lionel Roux (Chile) Marcelo Ríos (Slovakia) Karol Kučera (Sweden) Magnus Gustafsson
30 Sep	Grand Prix de Tennis de Lyon; Lyon, France; World Series carpet (i) – $725,000 – 32S/16D; Singles – Doubles	(United States) Jim Grabb (United States) Richey Reneberg; 6–2, 6–1	(United Kingdom) Neil Broad (South Africa) Piet Norval	(Sweden) Thomas Enqvist (United Kingdom) Tim Henman	(France) Lionel Roux (Chile) Marcelo Ríos (Slovakia) Karol Kučera (Sweden) Magnus Gustafsson
30 Sep	Marbella Open; Marbella, Spain; World Series; Clay – $303,000 – 32S/16D; Singles – Doubles	(Germany) Marc-Kevin Goellner; 7–6^{(7–4)}, 7–6^{(7–2)}	(Spain) Àlex Corretja	(Germany) Bernd Karbacher (Spain) Félix Mantilla	(Spain) Marcos Aurelio Gorriz (Uruguay) Marcelo Filippini (Spain) Fernando Vicente (Norway) Christian Ruud
30 Sep	Marbella Open; Marbella, Spain; World Series; Clay – $303,000 – 32S/16D; Singles – Doubles	(Australia) Andrew Kratzmann (United States) Jack Waite; 6–7, 6–3, 6–4	(Argentina) Pablo Albano (Argentina) Lucas Arnold Ker	(Germany) Bernd Karbacher (Spain) Félix Mantilla	(Spain) Marcos Aurelio Gorriz (Uruguay) Marcelo Filippini (Spain) Fernando Vicente (Norway) Christian Ruud

=== October ===
Week	Tournament	Champions	Runners-up	Semifinalists	Quarterfinalists
7 Oct	CA-TennisTrophy; Vienna, Austria; Championship Series; Carpet (i) – $675,000 – 32S/16D; Singles – Doubles	(Germany) Boris Becker; 6–4, 6–7^{(7–9)}, 6–2, 6–3	(Netherlands) Jan Siemerink	(France) Arnaud Boetsch (United States) Todd Martin	(Sweden) Stefan Edberg (Russia) Yevgeny Kafelnikov (Switzerland) Marc Rosset (Croatia) Goran Ivanišević
7 Oct	CA-TennisTrophy; Vienna, Austria; Championship Series; Carpet (i) – $675,000 – 32S/16D; Singles – Doubles	(Russia) Yevgeny Kafelnikov (Czech Republic) Daniel Vacek; 7–6, 6–4	(Netherlands) Menno Oosting (Czech Republic) Pavel Vízner	(France) Arnaud Boetsch (United States) Todd Martin	(Sweden) Stefan Edberg (Russia) Yevgeny Kafelnikov (Switzerland) Marc Rosset (Croatia) Goran Ivanišević
7 Oct	Nokia Open; Beijing, China; World Series; Carpet (i) – $303,000 – 32S/16D; Singles – Doubles	(United Kingdom) Greg Rusedski; 7–6^{(7–5)}, 6–4	(Czech Republic) Martin Damm	(Sweden) Thomas Johansson (Zimbabwe) Byron Black	(Australia) Scott Draper (Germany) Hendrik Dreekmann (Netherlands) Sjeng Schalken (Brazil) Gustavo Kuerten
7 Oct	Nokia Open; Beijing, China; World Series; Carpet (i) – $303,000 – 32S/16D; Singles – Doubles	(Czech Republic) Martin Damm (Russia) Andrei Olhovskiy; 6–4, 7–5	(Germany) Patrik Kühnen (South Africa) Gary Muller	(Sweden) Thomas Johansson (Zimbabwe) Byron Black	(Australia) Scott Draper (Germany) Hendrik Dreekmann (Netherlands) Sjeng Schalken (Brazil) Gustavo Kuerten
14 Oct	IPB Czech Indoor; Ostrava, Czech Republic; World Series; Carpet (i) – $450,000 – 32S/16D; Singles – Doubles	(Germany) David Prinosil; 6–1, 6–2	(Czech Republic) Petr Korda	(Czech Republic) Martin Damm (United Kingdom) Tim Henman	(Czech Republic) Jiří Novák (Germany) Michael Stich (United States) Todd Martin (South Africa) Wayne Ferreira
14 Oct	IPB Czech Indoor; Ostrava, Czech Republic; World Series; Carpet (i) – $450,000 – 32S/16D; Singles – Doubles	(Czech Republic) Cyril Suk (Australia) Sandon Stolle; 7–6, 6–3	(Slovakia) Ján Krošlák (Slovakia) Karol Kučera	(Czech Republic) Martin Damm (United Kingdom) Tim Henman	(Czech Republic) Jiří Novák (Germany) Michael Stich (United States) Todd Martin (South Africa) Wayne Ferreira
14 Oct	Eisenberg Israel Open; Tel Aviv, Israel; World Series; Hard – $303,000 – 32S/16D; Singles – Doubles	(Spain) Javier Sánchez; 6–4, 7–5	(South Africa) Marcos Ondruska	(United States) MaliVai Washington (Spain) Albert Costa	(South Africa) Grant Stafford (Argentina) Javier Frana (Argentina) Hernán Gumy (Australia) Scott Draper
14 Oct	Eisenberg Israel Open; Tel Aviv, Israel; World Series; Hard – $303,000 – 32S/16D; Singles – Doubles	(South Africa) Marcos Ondruska (South Africa) Grant Stafford; 6–3, 6–2	(Israel) Noam Behr (Israel) Eyal Erlich	(United States) MaliVai Washington (Spain) Albert Costa	(South Africa) Grant Stafford (Argentina) Javier Frana (Argentina) Hernán Gumy (Australia) Scott Draper
14 Oct	Grand Prix de Tennis de Toulouse; Toulouse, France; World Series; Hard (i) – $375,000 – 32S/16D; Singles – Doubles	(Australia) Mark Philippoussis; 6–1, 5–7, 6–4	(Sweden) Magnus Larsson	(Chile) Marcelo Ríos (Australia) Mark Woodforde	(Bulgaria) Orlin Stanoytchev (Germany) Bernd Karbacher (Morocco) Hicham Arazi (France) Cédric Pioline
14 Oct	Grand Prix de Tennis de Toulouse; Toulouse, France; World Series; Hard (i) – $375,000 – 32S/16D; Singles – Doubles	(Netherlands) Jacco Eltingh (Netherlands) Paul Haarhuis; 6–3, 7–5	(France) Olivier Delaître (France) Guillaume Raoux	(Chile) Marcelo Ríos (Australia) Mark Woodforde	(Bulgaria) Orlin Stanoytchev (Germany) Bernd Karbacher (Morocco) Hicham Arazi (France) Cédric Pioline
21 Oct	Eurocard Open; Stuttgart, Germany; Super 9 Carpet (i) – $1,950,000 – 48S/24D; Singles – Doubles	(Germany) Boris Becker; 3–6, 6–3, 3–6, 6–3, 6–4	(United States) Pete Sampras	(Netherlands) Jan Siemerink (United States) Michael Chang	(United States) Andre Agassi (Croatia) Goran Ivanišević (Sweden) Magnus Gustafsson (Chile) Marcelo Ríos
21 Oct	Eurocard Open; Stuttgart, Germany; Super 9 Carpet (i) – $1,950,000 – 48S/24D; Singles – Doubles	(Canada) Sébastien Lareau (United States) Alex O'Brien; 3–6, 6–4, 6–3	(Netherlands) Jacco Eltingh (Netherlands) Paul Haarhuis	(Netherlands) Jan Siemerink (United States) Michael Chang	(United States) Andre Agassi (Croatia) Goran Ivanišević (Sweden) Magnus Gustafsson (Chile) Marcelo Ríos
28 Oct	Paris Open; Paris, France; Super 9 Carpet (i) – $2,300,000 – 48S/24D; Singles – Doubles	(Sweden) Thomas Enqvist; 6–2, 6–4, 7–5	(Russia) Yevgeny Kafelnikov	(Sweden) Magnus Gustafsson (Czech Republic) Petr Korda	(Switzerland) Marc Rosset (Sweden) Stefan Edberg (Netherlands) Paul Haarhuis (France) Arnaud Boetsch
28 Oct	Paris Open; Paris, France; Super 9 Carpet (i) – $2,300,000 – 48S/24D; Singles – Doubles	(Netherlands) Jacco Eltingh (Netherlands) Paul Haarhuis; 6–4, 4–6, 7–6	(Russia) Yevgeny Kafelnikov (Czech Republic) Daniel Vacek	(Sweden) Magnus Gustafsson (Czech Republic) Petr Korda	(Switzerland) Marc Rosset (Sweden) Stefan Edberg (Netherlands) Paul Haarhuis (France) Arnaud Boetsch

=== November ===
Week	Tournament	Champions	Runners-up	Semifinalists	Quarterfinalists
4 Nov	Hellmann's Cup; Santiago, Chile; World Series; Clay – $203,000 – 32S/16D; Singles – Doubles	(Argentina) Hernán Gumy; 6–4, 7–5	(Chile) Marcelo Ríos	(Spain) Alberto Berasategui (Spain) Félix Mantilla	(Brazil) Fernando Meligeni (Uruguay) Marcelo Filippini (Spain) Emilio Benfele Álvarez (Germany) Oliver Gross
4 Nov	Hellmann's Cup; Santiago, Chile; World Series; Clay – $203,000 – 32S/16D; Singles – Doubles	(Brazil) Gustavo Kuerten (Brazil) Fernando Meligeni; 6–4, 6–2	(Romania) Dinu Pescariu (Spain) Albert Portas	(Spain) Alberto Berasategui (Spain) Félix Mantilla	(Brazil) Fernando Meligeni (Uruguay) Marcelo Filippini (Spain) Emilio Benfele Álvarez (Germany) Oliver Gross
4 Nov	Stockholm Open; Stockholm, Sweden; World Series; Hard (i) – $800,000 – 32S/16D; Singles – Doubles	(Sweden) Thomas Enqvist; 7–5, 6–4, 7–6^{(7–0)}	(United States) Todd Martin	(Sweden) Thomas Johansson (Sweden) Magnus Norman	(United Kingdom) Greg Rusedski (Sweden) Patrik Fredriksson (United States) Vincent Spadea (United States) Richey Reneberg
4 Nov	Stockholm Open; Stockholm, Sweden; World Series; Hard (i) – $800,000 – 32S/16D; Singles – Doubles	(United States) Patrick Galbraith (United States) Jonathan Stark; 7–6, 6–4	(United States) Todd Martin (United States) Chris Woodruff	(Sweden) Thomas Johansson (Sweden) Magnus Norman	(United Kingdom) Greg Rusedski (Sweden) Patrik Fredriksson (United States) Vincent Spadea (United States) Richey Reneberg
4 Nov	Kremlin Cup; Moscow, Russia; World Series; Carpet (i) – $1,125,000 – 32S/16D; Singles – Doubles	(Croatia) Goran Ivanišević; 3–6, 6–1, 6–3	(Russia) Yevgeny Kafelnikov	(Germany) David Prinosil (United States) Alex O'Brien	(Zimbabwe) Byron Black (Russia) Andrei Olhovskiy (Netherlands) Sjeng Schalken (Czech Republic) Petr Korda
4 Nov	Kremlin Cup; Moscow, Russia; World Series; Carpet (i) – $1,125,000 – 32S/16D; Singles – Doubles	(United States) Rick Leach (Russia) Andrei Olhovskiy; 4–6, 6–1, 6–2	(Czech Republic) Jiří Novák (Czech Republic) David Rikl	(Germany) David Prinosil (United States) Alex O'Brien	(Zimbabwe) Byron Black (Russia) Andrei Olhovskiy (Netherlands) Sjeng Schalken (Czech Republic) Petr Korda
13 Nov	ATP World Doubles Championships; Hartford, CT, United States; ATP Tour World Championships; Carpet (i) – $500,000 – 8D; Doubles	(Australia) Mark Woodforde (Australia) Todd Woodbridge; 6–4, 5–7, 6–2, 7–6	(Canada) Sébastien Lareau (United States) Alex O'Brien	(Zimbabwe) Byron Black / (Canada) Grant Connell (United States) Trevor Kronemann / (Australia) David Macpherson	
19 Nov	ATP World Championships; Hannover, Germany; ATP Tour World Championships; Carpet (i) – $3,300,000 – 8S; Singles	(United States) Pete Sampras; 3–6, 7–6^{(7–5)}, 7–6^{(7–4)}, 6–7^{(11–13)}, 6–4	(Germany) Boris Becker	(Croatia) Goran Ivanišević (Netherlands) Richard Krajicek	Round Robin (Austria) Thomas Muster (United States) Michael Chang (Russia) Yevgeny Kafelnikov (United States) Andre Agassi
26 Nov	Davis Cup Final; Malmö, Sweden – hard (i)	France 3–2	Sweden		

=== December ===
Week	Tournament	Champions	Runners-up	Semifinalists	Quarterfinalists
6 Dec	Grand Slam Cup; Munich, Germany; Carpet (i) – $6,000,000 – 8S	(Germany) Boris Becker; 6–3, 6–4, 6–4	(Croatia) Goran Ivanišević	(United Kingdom) Tim Henman (Russia) Yevgeny Kafelnikov	(United States) MaliVai Washington (Switzerland) Jakob Hlasek (United States) Jim Courier (Australia) Mark Woodforde

== ATP rankings ==
As of 8 January 1996
Rk	Name	Nation
1	Pete Sampras	USA
2	Andre Agassi	USA
3	Thomas Muster	AUT
4	Boris Becker	GER
5	Michael Chang	USA
6	Yevgeny Kafelnikov	RUS
7	Thomas Enqvist	SWE
8	Jim Courier	USA
9	Wayne Ferreira	RSA
10	Goran Ivanišević	CRO
11	Richard Krajicek	NED
12	Sergi Bruguera	ESP
13	Michael Stich	GER
14	Arnaud Boetsch	FRA
15	Marc Rosset	SUI
16	Andrei Medvedev	UKR
17	Todd Martin	USA
18	Paul Haarhuis	NED
19	Gilbert Schaller	AUT
20	Andrea Gaudenzi	ITA

Year-end rankings 1996 (30 December 1996)
Rk	Name	Nation	Points	High	Low	Change
1	Pete Sampras	USA	4865	1	3	Steady
2	Michael Chang	USA	3597	2	6	▲3
3	Yevgeny Kafelnikov	RUS	3564	3	8	▲3
4	Goran Ivanišević	CRO	3492	4	10	▲6
5	Thomas Muster	AUT	3166	1	6	▼2
6	Boris Becker	GER	2983	3	7	▼2
7	Richard Krajicek	NED	2380	7	27	▲4
8	Andre Agassi	USA	2364	1	9	▼6
9	Thomas Enqvist	SWE	2191	6	14	▼2
10	Wayne Ferreira	RSA	2149	6	13	▼1
11	Marcelo Ríos	CHI	2114	10	24	▲13
12	Todd Martin	USA	2039	11	22	▲5
13	Albert Costa	ESP	1757	13	23	▲10
14	Stefan Edberg	SWE	1567	14	55	▲16
15	Jan Siemerink	NED	1530	15	38	▲6
16	Michael Stich	GER	1518	11	21	▼3
17	Magnus Gustafsson	SWE	1515	17	87	▲69
18	Félix Mantilla	ESP	1505	15	96	▲74
19	Alberto Berasategui	ESP	1477	18	50	▲15
20	MaliVai Washington	USA	1472	11	25	▲5

== Statistical information ==
List of players and singles titles won:

- (United States) Andre Agassi – Miami Masters, Atlanta Olympics, Cincinnati Masters (3)
- (Morocco) Karim Alami – Atlanta, Palermo (2)
- (Germany) Boris Becker – Australian Open, London, Vienna, Stuttgart Masters, Grand Slam Cup (5)
- (Zimbabwe) Byron Black – Seoul (1)
- (Spain) Alberto Berasategui – Bologna, Kitzbühel, Bucharest (3)
- (Spain) Tomás Carbonell – Casablanca (1)
- (Spain) Roberto Carretero – Hamburg Masters (1)
- (United States) Michael Chang – Indian Wells Masters, Washington, D.C., Los Angeles (3)
- (Spain) Francisco Clavet – Amsterdam (1)
- (Spain) Albert Costa – Gstaad, San Marino, Bournemouth (3)
- (United States) Jim Courier – Philadelphia (1)
- (Czech Republic) Slava Doseděl – Munich (1)
- (Sweden) Thomas Enqvist – New Delhi, Paris Masters, Stockholm (3)
- (South Africa) Wayne Ferreira – Scottsdale, Canada Masters (2)
- (France) Guy Forget – Marseille (1)
- (Germany) Marc-Kevin Goellner – Marbella (1)
- (Argentina) Hernán Gumy – Santiago (1)
- (Sweden) Magnus Gustafsson – Saint Petersburg, Båstad (2)
- (Croatia) Goran Ivanišević – Zagreb, Dubai, Milan, Rotterdam, Moscow (5)
- (Russia) Yevgeny Kafelnikov – Adelaide, Prague, French Open, Lyon (4)
- (Czech Republic) Petr Korda – Doha (1)
- (Netherlands) Richard Krajicek – Wimbledon (1)
- (Sweden) Nicklas Kulti – Halle (1)
- (Spain) Félix Mantilla – Oporto (1)
- (United States) Todd Martin – Sydney Outdoor (1)
- (Ukraine) Andrei Medvedev – Long Island (1)
- (Brazil) Fernando Meligeni – Pinehurst (1)
- (Spain) Carlos Moyà – Umag (1)
- (Austria) Thomas Muster – Mexico City, Estoril, Barcelona, Monte Carlo Masters, Rome Masters, Stuttart Outdoor, Bogotá (7)
- (Czech Republic) Jiří Novák – Auckland (1)
- (Russia) Andrei Olhovskiy – Shanghai (1)
- (United States) Alex O'Brien – New Haven (1)
- (Venezuela) Nicolas Pereira – Newport (1)
- (Australia) Mark Philippoussis – Toulouse (1)
- (France) Cédric Pioline – Copenhagen (1)
- (Germany) David Prinosil – Ostrava (1)
- (United States) Richey Reneberg – Rosmalen (1)
- (Chile) Marcelo Ríos – St. Poelten (1)
- (United States) Pete Sampras – San Jose, Memphis, Hong Kong, Tokyo, Indianapolis, US Open, Basel, ATP Championships (8)
- (Spain) Javier Sánchez – Tel Aviv (1)
- (Netherlands) Sjeng Schalken – Jakarta (1)
- (Netherlands) Jan Siemerink – Nottingham (1)
- (United States) Jonathan Stark – Singapore (1)
- (United Kingdom) Greg Rusedski – Beijing (1)
- (Germany) Michael Stich – Antwerp (1)
- (Australia) Jason Stoltenberg – Coral Springs (1)
- (United States) MaliVai Washington – Bermuda (1)

Titles won by nation:

- (United States) 20 (Sydney Outdoor, San Jose, Memphis, Philadelphia, Indian Wells Masters, Miami Masters, Hong Kong, Bermuda, Tokyo, Rosmalen, Washington, D.C., Atlanta Olympics, Los Angeles, Cincinnati Masters, Indianapolis, New Haven, US Open, Basel, Singapore, ATP Championships)
- (Spain) 12 (Casablanca, Hamburg Masters, Oporto, Bologna, Gstaad, Kitzbühel, Amsterdam, San Marino, Umag, Bucharest, Bournemouth, Tel Aviv)
- (Austria) 7 (Mexico City, Estoril, Barcelona, Monte Carlo Masters, Rome Masters, Stuttgart Outdoor, Bogotá)
- (Germany) 7 (Australian Open, Antwerp, London, Marbella, Vienna, Ostrava, Stuttgart Masters)
- (Sweden) 6 (Saint Petersburg, New Delhi, Halle, Båstad, Paris Masters, Stockholm)
- (Croatia) 5 (Zagreb, Dubai, Milan, Rotterdam, Moscow)
- (Russia) 5 (Adelaide, Shanghai, Prague, French Open, Lyon)
- (Czech Republic) 3 (Auckland, Doha, Prague)
- (Netherlands) 3 (Jakarta, Nottingham, Wimbledon)
- (Australia) 2 (Coral Springs, Toulouse)
- (France) 2 (Marseille, Copenhagen)
- (Morocco) 2 (Atlanta, Palermo)
- (South Africa) 2 (Scottsdale, Canada Masters)
- (Argentina) 1 (Santiago)
- (Brazil) 1 (Pinehurst)
- (Chile) 1 (St. Poelten)
- (United Kingdom) 1 (Beijing)
- (Ukraine) 1 (Long Island)
- (Venezuela) 1 (Newport)
- (Zimbabwe) 1 (Seoul)

The following players won their first career title:

- (Morocco) Karim Alami – Atlanta
- (Zimbabwe) Byron Black – Seoul
- (Spain) Roberto Carretero – Hamburg Masters
- (Argentina) Hernán Gumy – Santiago
- (Spain) Félix Mantilla – Oporto
- (Czech Republic) Jiří Novák – Auckland
- (Australia) Mark Philippoussis – Toulouse
- (France) Cédric Pioline – Copenhagen

== See also ==
- 1996 WTA Tour
