= 1996 America's Red Clay Court Championships – Doubles =

Doubles
- 1996 America's Red Clay Court Championships

Final
- Champions: (Australia) Todd Woodbridge (Australia) Mark Woodforde
- Runners-up: (United States) Ivan Baron (United States) Brett Hansen-Dent
- Score: 6–3, 6–3

Details
- Draw: 16
- Seeds: 4

Events
Singles	Doubles
- Delray Beach Open

Todd Woodbridge and Mark Woodforde were the defending champions and won in the final 6–3, 6–3 against Ivan Baron and Brett Hansen-Dent.

== Seeds ==
1. (Australia) Todd Woodbridge / (Australia) Mark Woodforde (champions)
2. (United States) Brian MacPhie / (Australia) Michael Tebbutt (first round)
3. (United States) Donald Johnson / (United States) Francisco Montana (first round)
4. (France) Guillaume Raoux / (United States) Chris Woodruff (first round)

== Draw ==
Key

- Q = Qualifier
- WC = Wild card
- LL = Lucky loser
- Alt = Alternate
- ITF = ITF entry
- PR = Protected ranking
- SR = Special ranking
- SE = Special exempt
- JE = Junior exempt
- JR = Junior Accelerator Programme entrant
- CO = College Accelerator Programme entrant
- NG = Next Gen Accelerator Program entrant
- w/o = Walkover
- r = Retired
- d = Defaulted

First round
1	(Australia) T Woodbridge (Australia) M Woodforde	6	7
WC	(United States) M Merklein (United States) B Shelton	3	5
WC	(United States) D Flach (United States) V Spadea	6	6
(United States) V Winitsky (United States) B Willenborg	1	4
3	(United States) D Johnson (United States) F Montana	3	6	4
(United States) L Jensen (United States) M Jensen	6	3	6
WC	(Australia) P Cash (Czech Republic) K Nováček	6	6
(The Bahamas) R Smith (Netherlands) J Winnink	2	3
Q	(Germany) A Rădulescu (Belgium) J van Herck	4^{r}
(France) G Bastié (Canada) S Leblanc	5
(United States) I Baron (United States) B Hansen-Dent	6	7	7
4	(France) G Raoux (United States) C Woodruff	7	6	6
(United States) D DiLucia (Australia) S Draper	6	6	3
(United States) D Pate (United States) J Tarango	7	4	6
(Morocco) K Alami (Hungary) G Köves	4	7	6
2	(United States) B MacPhie (Australia) M Tebbutt	6	5	3

Quarterfinals
1	(Australia) T Woodbridge (Australia) M Woodforde	7	6
WC	(United States) D Flach (United States) V Spadea	5	4
(United States) L Jensen (United States) M Jensen	6	3	6
WC	(Australia) P Cash (Czech Republic) K Nováček	3	6	4
(France) G Bastié (Canada) S Leblanc	6	4
(United States) I Baron (United States) B Hansen-Dent	7	6
(United States) D Pate (United States) J Tarango	6	1	4
(Morocco) K Alami (Hungary) G Köves	3	6	6

Semifinals
1	(Australia) T Woodbridge (Australia) M Woodforde	6	3	6
(United States) L Jensen (United States) M Jensen	4	6	3
(United States) I Baron (United States) B Hansen-Dent	6	4	6
(Morocco) K Alami (Hungary) G Köves	3	6	2

Final
1	(Australia) T Woodbridge (Australia) M Woodforde	6	6
(United States) I Baron (United States) B Hansen-Dent	3	3
