= 1995 International Tennis Championships – Doubles =

Doubles
- 1995 International Tennis Championships

Final
- Champions: (Australia) Todd Woodbridge (Australia) Mark Woodforde
- Runners-up: (Spain) Sergio Casal (Spain) Emilio Sánchez
- Score: 6–3, 6–1

Details
- Draw: 16
- Seeds: 4

Events
Singles	Doubles
- Delray Beach Open

Lan Bale and Brett Steven were the defending champions, but Bale did not participate this year. Steven partnered Tommy Ho, losing in the semifinals.

Todd Woodbridge and Mark Woodforde won in the final 6–3, 6–1, against Sergio Casal and Emilio Sánchez.

== Seeds ==
1. (Australia) Todd Woodbridge / (Australia) Mark Woodforde (champions)
2. (United States) Jim Grabb / (United States) Patrick McEnroe (semifinals)
3. (Spain) Sergio Casal / (Spain) Emilio Sánchez (final)
4. (United States) Tommy Ho / (New Zealand) Brett Steven (semifinals)

== Draw ==
Key

- Q = Qualifier
- WC = Wild card
- LL = Lucky loser
- Alt = Alternate
- ITF = ITF entry
- PR = Protected ranking
- SR = Special ranking
- SE = Special exempt
- JE = Junior exempt
- JR = Junior Accelerator Programme entrant
- CO = College Accelerator Programme entrant
- NG = Next Gen Accelerator Program entrant
- w/o = Walkover
- r = Retired
- d = Defaulted

=== Draw ===
First round
1	(Australia) T Woodbridge (Australia) M Woodforde	6	6
WC	(United States) I Baron (United States) D Rostagno	3	2
(Spain) J Arrese (Argentina) D Orsanic	4	4
WC	(United States) D Flach (United States) B Shelton	6	6
4	(United States) T Ho (New Zealand) B Steven	w/o
(France) G Raoux (United Kingdom) G Rusedski
(United States) K Jones (United States) D Pate	6	7	6
(United States) K Kinnear (United States) K Thorne	7	5	4
Q	(Mexico) L Lavalle (United States) F Montana	6	6
(United States) B MacPhie (United States) J Waite	4	4
(United States) L Jensen (United States) M Jensen	4	4
3	(Spain) S Casal (Spain) E Sánchez	6	6
(United States) A O'Brien (Australia) S Stolle	5	6	7
(United States) D Randall (United States) G Van Emburgh	7	3	6
WC	(United States) K Flach (United States) R Seguso	6	6
2	(United States) J Grabb (United States) P McEnroe	7	7

Quarterfinals
1	(Australia) T Woodbridge (Australia) M Woodforde	6	6
WC	(United States) D Flach (United States) B Shelton	2	1
4	(United States) T Ho (New Zealand) B Steven	7	7
(United States) K Jones (United States) D Pate	5	6
Q	(Mexico) L Lavalle (United States) F Montana	7	4	4
3	(Spain) S Casal (Spain) E Sánchez	6	6	6
(United States) A O'Brien (Australia) S Stolle	5	4
2	(United States) J Grabb (United States) P McEnroe	7	6

Semifinals
1	(Australia) T Woodbridge (Australia) M Woodforde	6	6
4	(United States) T Ho (New Zealand) B Steven	2	2
3	(Spain) S Casal (Spain) E Sánchez	5	6	7
2	(United States) J Grabb (United States) P McEnroe	7	1	5

Final
1	(Australia) T Woodbridge (Australia) M Woodforde	6	6
3	(Spain) S Casal (Spain) E Sánchez	3	1
