= 1995 International Tennis Championships – Singles =

Singles
- 1995 International Tennis Championships

Final
- Champion: (Australia) Todd Woodbridge
- Runner-up: (United Kingdom) Greg Rusedski
- Score: 6–4, 6–2

Details
- Draw: 32
- Seeds: 8

Events
Singles	Doubles
- Delray Beach Open

Todd Woodbridge defeated Greg Rusedski 6–4, 6–2 to win the 1995 International Tennis Championships singles event. Luiz Mattar was the champion but did not defend his title.

== Seeds ==
1. (Sweden) Magnus Larsson (first round)
2. (Sweden) Thomas Enqvist (quarterfinals)
3. (United States) David Wheaton (second round)
4. (Australia) Mark Woodforde (semifinals)
5. (New Zealand) Brett Steven (quarterfinals)
6. (Canada) / (United Kingdom) Greg Rusedski (final)
7. (United States) Jonathan Stark (second round)
8. (Argentina) Javier Frana (semifinals)

== Draw ==
Key

- Q = Qualifier
- WC = Wild card
- LL = Lucky loser
- Alt = Alternate
- ITF = ITF entry
- PR = Protected ranking
- SR = Special ranking
- SE = Special exempt
- JE = Junior exempt
- JR = Junior Accelerator Programme entrant
- CO = College Accelerator Programme entrant
- NG = Next Gen Accelerator Program entrant
- w/o = Walkover
- r = Retired
- d = Defaulted

=== Finals ===
Semifinals
8	(Argentina) Javier Frana	6^{6}	4
6	(Canada) Greg Rusedski	7^{8}	6
4	(Australia) Mark Woodforde	6	5	5
(Australia) Todd Woodbridge	1	7	7

Finals
6	(United Kingdom) Greg Rusedski	4	2
(Australia) Todd Woodbridge	6	6

=== Section 1 ===
First round
1	(Sweden) M Larsson	6^{5}	3
WC	(United States) I Baron	7^{7}	6
Q	(Brazil) J Oncins	4	4
(Venezuela) N Pereira	6	6
(France) L Roux	5	3
(Australia) M Tebbutt	7	6
(United States) T Ho	4	2
8	(Argentina) J Frana	6	6
3	(United States) D Wheaton	6	6
(Australia) J Morgan	3	3
(Argentina) H Gumy	6	6
(Spain) J Arrese	2	2
WC	(United States) L Jensen	4	6	7^{9}
(United States) B Shelton	6	4	6^{7}
(United States) A O'Brien	4	4
6	(Canada) G Rusedski	6	6

Second round
WC	(United States) I Baron	4	4
(Venezuela) N Pereira	6	6
(Australia) M Tebbutt	4	4
8	(Argentina) J Frana	6	6
3	(United States) D Wheaton	3	6^{5}
(Argentina) H Gumy	6	7^{7}
WC	(United States) L Jensen	1	2
6	(Canada) G Rusedski	6	6

Quarterfinals
(Venezuela) N Pereira	6	6^{8}	6^{5}
8	(Argentina) J Frana	4	7^{10}	7^{7}
(Argentina) H Gumy	6^{7}	4
6	(Canada) G Rusedski	7^{9}	6

Semifinals
8	(Argentina) J Frana	6^{6}	4
6	(Canada) G Rusedski	7^{8}	6

=== Section 2 ===
First round
5	(New Zealand) B Steven	3	7^{7}	6
(United States) P McEnroe	6	6^{5}	0
Q	(Canada) A Sznajder	6	3	4
WC	(Australia) S Stolle	3	6	6
Q	(United States) R Weiss	7^{7}	4	2
(Switzerland) J Hlasek	6^{3}	6	6
(Colombia) M Hadad	7^{7}	1	4
4	(Australia) M Woodforde	6^{5}	6	6
7	(United States) J Stark	7^{8}	3	6
Q	(Argentina) G Etlis	6^{6}	6	3
(Australia) T Woodbridge	6	6
(France) G Raoux	4	1
(Brazil) F Meligeni	6^{5}	3
(Spain) E Sánchez	7^{7}	6
(Czech Republic) R Vašek	2	2
2	(Sweden) T Enqvist	6	6

Second round
5	(New Zealand) B Steven	6	6
WC	(Australia) S Stolle	2	2
(Switzerland) J Hlasek	1	2
4	(Australia) M Woodforde	6	6
7	(United States) J Stark	3	3
(Australia) T Woodbridge	6	6
(Spain) E Sánchez	1	6^{5}
2	(Sweden) T Enqvist	6	7^{7}

Quarterfinals
5	(New Zealand) B Steven	6	6^{3}	6^{7}
4	(Australia) M Woodforde	3	7^{7}	7^{9}
(Australia) T Woodbridge	4
2	(Sweden) T Enqvist	3	R

Semifinals
4	(Australia) M Woodforde	6	5	5
(Australia) T Woodbridge	1	7	7
