= 1996 Croatian Indoors =

- Date: 29 January – 4 February
- Edition: 1st
- Category: World Series
- Draw: 32S / 16D
- Prize money: $375,000
- Surface: Carpet / indoor
- Location: Zagreb, Croatia
- Venue: Dom Sportova

Champions

Singles
- (Croatia) Goran Ivanišević

Doubles
- (Netherlands) Menno Oosting / (Belgium) Libor Pimek
- Croatian Indoors

The 1996 Croatian Indoors was a men's tennis tournament played on indoor carpet courts at the Dom Sportova in Zagreb, Croatia and was part of the World Series of the 1996 ATP Tour. It was the inaugural edition of the tournament and was held from 29 January through 4 February 1996. First-seeded Goran Ivanišević won the singles title.

== Finals ==
=== Singles ===
(Croatia) Goran Ivanišević defeated (France) Cédric Pioline 3–6, 6–3, 6–2

- It was Ivanišević's 1st singles title of the year and the 13th of his career.

=== Doubles ===
(Netherlands) Menno Oosting / (Belgium) Libor Pimek defeated (Czech Republic) Martin Damm / (Netherlands) Hendrik Jan Davids 6–3, 7–6

- It was Oosting's only title of the year and the 6th of his career. It was Pimek's 1st title of the year and the 14th of his career.
