= 1996 Skoda Czech Open – Doubles =

Doubles
- 1996 Skoda Czech Open

Final
- Champions: (Russia) Yevgeny Kafelnikov (Czech Republic) Daniel Vacek
- Runners-up: (Argentina) Luis Lobo (Spain) Javier Sánchez
- Score: 6–3, 6–7, 6–3

Details
- Draw: 16
- Seeds: 4

Events
| Singles | Doubles |
| ← 1995 · | Prague Open | · 1997 → |

The 1996 Skoda Czech Open was a men's tennis tournament played on Clay in Prague, Czech Republic that was part of the International Series of the 1996 ATP Tour. Libor Pimek and Byron Talbot were the defending champions but lost in the semifinals to Yevgeny Kafelnikov and Daniel Vacek.

Kafelnikov and Vacek won in the final 6–3, 6–7, 6–3 against Luis Lobo and Javier Sánchez.

== Seeds ==
Champion seeds are indicated in bold text while text in italics indicates the round in which those seeds were eliminated.

1. (Russia) **Yevgeny Kafelnikov** / (Czech Republic) **Daniel Vacek (champions)**
2. (Argentina) Luis Lobo / (Spain) Javier Sánchez (final)
3. (Czech Republic) David Rikl / (Spain) Emilio Sánchez (quarterfinals)
4. (Czech Republic) Martin Damm / (Czech Republic) Cyril Suk (semifinals)

== Draw ==
=== Key ===
- Q = Qualifier
- WC = Wild card
- LL = Lucky loser
- Alt = Alternate
- SE = Special exempt
- PR = Protected ranking
- ITF = ITF entry
- JE = Junior exempt
- w/o = Walkover
- r = Retired
- d = Defaulted
- SR = Special ranking

First round
1 | (Russia) **Y Kafelnikov** (Czech Republic) **D Vacek** | **6** | **7**
(Czech Republic) T Krupa (Czech Republic) P Vízner | 1 | 6
(Sweden) **R Bergh** (United States) **S Cannon** | **7** | **6**
(Hungary) G Köves (Hungary) L Markovits | 5 | 2
3 | (Czech Republic) **D Rikl** (Spain) **E Sánchez** | **7** | **6**
(Australia) W Arthurs (Portugal) N Marques | 5 | 2
(Belgium) **L Pimek** (South Africa) **B Talbot** | **6** | **6**
Q | (Brazil) G Kuerten (Argentina) D Orsanic | 3 | 1
WC | (Russia) A Chesnokov (Belgium) F Dewulf | 3 | **6** | 4
WC | (Czech Republic) **J Kodeš Jr.** (Czech Republic) **D Škoch** | **6** | 1 | **6**
LL | (Czech Republic) D Miketa (Czech Republic) T Zíb | 4 | 1
4 | (Czech Republic) **M Damm** (Czech Republic) **C Suk** | **6** | **6**
(United States) **D Johnson** (United States) **F Montana** | **6** | **7**
(Czech Republic) V Flégl (France) F Santoro | 2 | 5
(Australia) J Ireland (Australia) P Tramacchi | 4 | 4
2 | (Argentina) **L Lobo** (Spain) **J Sánchez** | **6** | **6**

Quarterfinals
1 | (Russia) **Y Kafelnikov** (Czech Republic) **D Vacek** | **6** | **6**
(Sweden) R Bergh (United States) S Cannon | 3 | 3
3 | (Czech Republic) D Rikl (Spain) E Sánchez | 3 | 4
(Belgium) **L Pimek** (South Africa) **B Talbot** | **6** | **6**
WC | (Czech Republic) J Kodeš Jr. (Czech Republic) D Škoch | 1 | 2
4 | (Czech Republic) **M Damm** (Czech Republic) **C Suk** | **6** | **6**
(United States) D Johnson (United States) F Montana | 3 | **6** | 3
2 | (Argentina) **L Lobo** (Spain) **J Sánchez** | **6** | 3 | **6**

Semifinals
1 | (Russia) **Y Kafelnikov** (Czech Republic) **D Vacek** | **6** | 3 | **6**
(Belgium) L Pimek (South Africa) B Talbot | 3 | **6** | 3
4 | (Czech Republic) M Damm (Czech Republic) C Suk | 2 | 4
2 | (Argentina) **L Lobo** (Spain) **J Sánchez** | **6** | **6**

Final
1 | (Russia) **Yevgeny Kafelnikov** (Czech Republic) **Daniel Vacek** | **6** | 6 | **6**
2 | (Argentina) Luis Lobo (Spain) Javier Sánchez | 3 | **7** | 3
