= 1996 Skoda Czech Open =

Tennis tournament

- Date: 29 April – 5 May
- Edition: 10th
- Category: World Series
- Draw: 32S / 16D
- Prize money: $340,000
- Surface: Clay / outdoor
- Location: Prague, Czech Republic
- Venue: I. Czech Lawn Tennis Club

Champions

Singles
- (Russia) Yevgeny Kafelnikov

Doubles
- (Russia) Yevgeny Kafelnikov / (Czech Republic) Daniel Vacek
- Prague Open

The 1996 Skoda Czech Open was a men's tennis tournament played on outdoor clay courts at the I. Czech Lawn Tennis Club in Prague, Czech Republic and was part of the World Series of the 1996 ATP Tour. It was the tenth edition of the tournament and ran from 29 April until 5 May 1996. Second-seeded Yevgeny Kafelnikov won the singles title.

== Finals ==
=== Singles ===
(Russia) Yevgeny Kafelnikov defeated (Czech Republic) Bohdan Ulihrach 7–5, 1–6, 6–3

- It was Kafelnikov's 2nd singles title of the year and the 9th of his career.

=== Doubles ===
(Russia) Yevgeny Kafelnikov / (Czech Republic) Daniel Vacek defeated (Argentina) Luis Lobo / (Spain) Javier Sánchez 6–3, 6–7, 6–3

- It was Kafelnikov's 3rd title of the year and the 11th of his career. It was Vacek's 1st title of the year and the 11th of his career.

== See also ==
- 1996 Pupp Czech Open – women's tournament
