= 1996 Croatian Indoors – Doubles =

Tennis tournament

Doubles
- 1996 Croatian Indoors

Final
- Champions: (Netherlands) Menno Oosting (Belgium) Libor Pimek
- Runners-up: (Czech Republic) Martin Damm (Netherlands) Hendrik Jan Davids
- Score: 6–3, 7–6

Details
- Draw: 16
- Seeds: 4

Events
Singles	Doubles
Croatian Indoors	· 1997 →

The 1996 Croatian Indoors doubles was an event of the 1996 Croatian Indoors tennis tournament played on indoor carpet courts at the Dom Sportova in Zagreb in Croatia and was part of the 1996 ATP Tour. The tournament was held from 29 January through 4 February 1996. The doubles draw consisted of 16 teams of which four were seeded. Second-seeded team of Menno Oosting and Libor Pimek won the doubles title after defeating the fourth-seeded team of Martin Damm and Hendrik Jan Davids in the final 6–3, 7–6.

== Seeds ==
1. (Spain) Tomás Carbonell / (Spain) Javier Sánchez (semifinals)
2. (Netherlands) Menno Oosting / (Belgium) Libor Pimek (champions)
3. (Germany) Marc-Kevin Goellner / (Germany) David Prinosil (first round)
4. (Czech Republic) Martin Damm / (Netherlands) Hendrik Jan Davids (final)

== Draw ==
=== Key ===
- Q = Qualifier
- WC = Wild card
- LL = Lucky loser
- Alt = Alternate
- ITF = ITF entry
- PR = Protected ranking
- SR = Special ranking
- SE = Special exempt
- JE = Junior exempt
- JR = Junior Accelerator Programme entrant
- CO = College Accelerator Programme entrant
- NG = Next Gen Accelerator Program entrant
- w/o = Walkover
- r = Retired
- d = Defaulted

First round
1	(Spain) T Carbonell (Spain) J Sánchez	6	6	6
(Spain) J A Conde (Portugal) N Marques	3	7	1
LL	(Croatia) G Orešić (Croatia) I Saric	6	6
WC	(Croatia) I Karlović (Croatia) I Ljubičić	4	4
4	(Czech Republic) M Damm (Netherlands) H J Davids	3	6	6
(United States) B Behrens (United States) J Waite	6	3	3
(Croatia) S Hiršzon (Croatia) G Ivanišević	6	3	7
(South Africa) M Barnard (Germany) M Sinner	3	6	6
(Czech Republic) V Flégl (Czech Republic) T Krupa	3	3
(Hungary) G Köves (Hungary) L Markovits	6	6
(Netherlands) T Kempers (Netherlands) S Noteboom	7	6
3	(Germany) M-K Goellner (Germany) D Prinosil	6	4
Q	(Czech Republic) J Kodeš Jr. (Czech Republic) P Pála	3	6	4
WC	(France) C Pioline (France) G Raoux	6	3	6
WC	(Italy) A Gaudenzi (Hungary) S Noszály	4	6
2	(Netherlands) M Oosting (Belgium) L Pimek	6	7

Quarterfinals
1	(Spain) T Carbonell (Spain) J Sánchez	6	7
LL	(Croatia) G Orešić (Croatia) I Saric	4	5
4	(Czech Republic) M Damm (Netherlands) H J Davids	6	6	6
(Croatia) S Hiršzon (Croatia) G Ivanišević	7	3	4
(Hungary) G Köves (Hungary) L Markovits	3	5
(Netherlands) T Kempers (Netherlands) S Noteboom	6	7
WC	(France) C Pioline (France) G Raoux	6	1	3
2	(Netherlands) M Oosting (Belgium) L Pimek	4	6	6

Semifinals
1	(Spain) T Carbonell (Spain) J Sánchez	6	1
4	(Czech Republic) M Damm (Netherlands) H J Davids	7	6
(Netherlands) T Kempers (Netherlands) S Noteboom	3	2
2	(Netherlands) M Oosting (Belgium) L Pimek	6	6

Final
4	(Czech Republic) M Damm (Netherlands) H J Davids	3	6
2	(Netherlands) M Oosting (Belgium) L Pimek	6	7
