= 1996 Croatian Indoors – Singles =

Singles
- 1996 Croatian Indoors

Final
- Champion: (Croatia) Goran Ivanišević
- Runner-up: (France) Cédric Pioline
- Score: 3–6, 6–3, 6–2

Details
- Draw: 32
- Seeds: 8

Events
Singles	Doubles
- Croatian Indoors

The 1996 Croatian Indoors – Singles was an event of the 1996 Croatian Indoors tennis tournament played on indoor carpet courts at the Dom Sportova in Zagreb in Croatia and was part of the World Series of the 1996 ATP Tour. The tournament ran from 29 January through 4 February 1996. The singles draw comprised 32 players and eight of them were seeded. First-seeded Goran Ivanišević won the singles title after a win in the final 3–6, 6–3, 6–2 against unseeded Cédric Pioline.

== Seeds ==
1. (Croatia) Goran Ivanišević (champion)
2. (France) Arnaud Boetsch (first round)
3. (Italy) Andrea Gaudenzi (second round)
4. (Germany) David Prinosil (first round)
5. (Germany) Bernd Karbacher (first round)
6. (Switzerland) Jakob Hlasek (first round)
7. (Spain) Javier Sánchez (second round)
8. (Romania) Adrian Voinea (quarterfinals)

== Draw ==
Key

- Q = Qualifier
- WC = Wild card
- LL = Lucky loser
- Alt = Alternate
- ITF = ITF entry
- PR = Protected ranking
- SR = Special ranking
- SE = Special exempt
- JE = Junior exempt
- JR = Junior Accelerator Programme entrant
- CO = College Accelerator Programme entrant
- NG = Next Gen Accelerator Program entrant
- w/o = Walkover
- r = Retired
- d = Defaulted

=== Finals ===
Semifinals
1	(Croatia) Goran Ivanišević	7^{7}	4	6
(France) Guy Forget	6^{4}	6	4
(France) Cédric Pioline	6	7^{8}
(Germany) Marc-Kevin Goellner	4	6^{6}

Final
1	(Croatia) Goran Ivanišević	3	6	6
(France) Cédric Pioline	6	3	2

=== Top half ===
First round
1	(Croatia) G Ivanišević	6	7^{7}
(Norway) C Ruud	4	6^{3}
(Germany) M Sinner	6	3	6
(Sweden) A Järryd	1	6	3
WC	(Croatia) S Hiršzon	6	3	6
(Morocco) K Alami	4	6	3
Q	(Czech Republic) A Musil	6^{5}	5
8	(Romania) A Voinea	7^{7}	7
4	(Germany) D Prinosil	2	6^{4}
(France) G Forget	6	7^{7}
(Hungary) S Noszály	6^{2}	2
Q	(Netherlands) T Kempers	7^{7}	6
(Czech Republic) M Damm	2	7	6
(Denmark) F Fetterlein	6	5	3
(Germany) C-U Steeb	6	6
WC/5	(Germany) B Karbacher	2	3

Second round
1	(Croatia) G Ivanišević	6	6
(Germany) M Sinner	4	4
WC	(Croatia) S Hiršzon	3	6^{8}
8	(Romania) A Voinea	6	7^{10}
(France) G Forget	7	6
Q	(Netherlands) T Kempers	5	4
(Czech Republic) M Damm	6	4	6^{7}
(Germany) C-U Steeb	2	6	7^{9}

Quarterfinals
1	(Croatia) G Ivanišević	3	6	7^{7}
8	(Romania) A Voinea	6	4	6^{4}
(France) G Forget	6	6
(Germany) C-U Steeb	3	4

Semifinals
1	(Croatia) G Ivanišević	7^{7}	4	6
(France) G Forget	6^{4}	6	4

=== Bottom half ===
First round
6	(Switzerland) J Hlasek	2	7	3
(France) C Pioline	6	5	6
Q	(Netherlands) H J Davids	6	3	2
(Belgium) J van Herck	2	6	6
(Spain) F Mantilla	3	3
(Belgium) F Dewulf	6	6
Q	(United States) J Waite	2	4
WC/3	(Italy) A Gaudenzi	6	6
7	(Spain) J Sánchez	6	6
(Portugal) N Marques	3	4
(Belgium) K Goossens	1	2
(Germany) M-K Goellner	6	6
(Spain) T Carbonell	6^{5}	6	6
(France) F Vitoux	7^{7}	2	3
(France) G Raoux	6	7^{7}
2	(France) A Boetsch	3	6^{4}

Second round
(France) C Pioline	6	6
(Belgium) J van Herck	3	3
(Belgium) F Dewulf	6	6
WC/3	(Italy) A Gaudenzi	3	3
7	(Spain) J Sánchez	6^{5}	4
(Germany) M-K Goellner	7^{7}	6
(Spain) T Carbonell	6	2	1
(France) G Raoux	4	6	6

Quarterfinals
(France) C Pioline	6	3	7
(Belgium) F Dewulf	4	6	5
(Germany) M-K Goellner	6	6
(France) G Raoux	4	2

Semifinals
(France) C Pioline	6	7^{8}
(Germany) M-K Goellner	4	6^{6}
