= 1995 International Tennis Championships =

- Date: May 15–22
- Edition: 3rd
- Category: World Series
- Draw: 32S / 16D
- Prize money: $230,000
- Surface: Clay / outdoor
- Location: Coral Springs, Florida, U.S.

Champions

Singles
- (Australia) Todd Woodbridge

Doubles
- (Australia) Todd Woodbridge / (Australia) Mark Woodforde
← 1994 ·	Delray Beach Open	· 1996 →

The 1995 International Tennis Championships was a men's ATP tennis tournament held in Coral Springs, Florida in the United States and played on outdoor clay courts. The event was part of the World Series of the 1995 ATP Tour. It was the third edition of the tournament and was held from May 15 to May 22, 1995. Unseeded Todd Woodbridge won the singles title.

== Finals ==
=== Singles ===
(Australia) Todd Woodbridge defeated (United Kingdom) Greg Rusedski 6–4, 6–2

- It was Woodbridge's 5th title of the year and the 32nd of his career.

=== Doubles ===
(Australia) Todd Woodbridge / (Australia) Mark Woodforde defeated (Spain) Sergio Casal / (Spain) Emilio Sánchez 6–3, 6–1

- It was Woodbridge's 4th title of the year and the 31st of his career. It was Woodforde's 4th title of the year and the 36th of his career.
