= 1996 Singapore Open (tennis) =

- Date: September 30 – October 6
- Edition: 5th
- Category: World Series
- Draw: 32S / 16D
- Prize money: $389,250
- Surface: Carpet / indoor
- Location: Singapore, Singapore

Champions

Singles
- (United States) Jonathan Stark

Doubles
- (Australia) Todd Woodbridge / (Australia) Mark Woodforde
← 1995 ·	Singapore Open	· 1997 →

The 1996 Singapore Open was a men's tennis tournament played on indoor carpet courts in Singapore and was part of the World Series of the 1996 ATP Tour. The tournament ran from September 30 through October 6, 1996. Unseeded Jonathan Stark, who entered the main draw as a qualifier, won the singles title.

== Finals ==
=== Singles ===
(United States) Jonathan Stark defeated (United States) Michael Chang 6–4, 6–4

- It was Stark's 2nd title of the year and the 16th of his career.

=== Doubles ===
(Australia) Todd Woodbridge / (Australia) Mark Woodforde defeated (Czech Republic) Martin Damm / (Russia) Andrei Olhovskiy 7–6, 7–6

- It was Woodbridge's 11th title of the year and the 51st of his career. It was Woodforde's 12th title of the year and the 55th of his career.
