= 1996 America's Red Clay Court Championships – Singles =

Singles
- 1996 America's Red Clay Court Championships

Final
- Champion: (Australia) Jason Stoltenberg
- Runner-up: (United States) Chris Woodruff
- Score: 7–6^{(7–4)}, 2–6, 7–5

Details
- Draw: 32
- Seeds: 8

Events
Singles	Doubles
- Delray Beach Open

Todd Woodbridge was the defending champion but lost in the second round to Sandon Stolle.

Jason Stoltenberg won in the final 7–6^{(7–4)}, 2–6, 7–5 against Chris Woodruff.

== Seeds ==
1. (Australia) Mark Woodforde (second round)
2. (Australia) Todd Woodbridge (second round)
3. (Sweden) Magnus Gustafsson (semifinals)
4. (Argentina) Javier Frana (semifinals)
5. (Morocco) Karim Alami (first round)
6. (Spain) Félix Mantilla (second round)
7. (Australia) Jason Stoltenberg (champion)
8. (Brazil) Fernando Meligeni (first round)

== Draw ==
Key

- Q = Qualifier
- WC = Wild card
- LL = Lucky loser
- Alt = Alternate
- ITF = ITF entry
- PR = Protected ranking
- SR = Special ranking
- SE = Special exempt
- JE = Junior exempt
- JR = Junior Accelerator Programme entrant
- CO = College Accelerator Programme entrant
- NG = Next Gen Accelerator Program entrant
- w/o = Walkover
- r = Retired
- d = Defaulted

=== Finals ===
Semifinals
(United States) Chris Woodruff	6	6
4	(Argentina) Javier Frana	4	2
3	(Sweden) Magnus Gustafsson	3	6	2
7	(Australia) Jason Stoltenberg	6	3	6

Final
(United States) Chris Woodruff	6^{4}	6	5
7	(Australia) Jason Stoltenberg	7^{7}	2	7

=== Top half ===
First round
1	(Australia) M Woodforde	6	5	6
(United States) J Tarango	0	7	3
(Australia) R Fromberg	6	6
Q	(Venezuela) J Szymanski	4	4
Q	(Brazil) J Oncins	7^{9}	1	5
(United States) C Woodruff	6^{7}	6	7
(Ecuador) L Morejón	6	6
8	(Brazil) F Meligeni	3	1
4	(Argentina) J Frana	6	6
(Germany) A Rădulescu	4	4
(Australia) P Rafter	6	7
WC	(United States) L Jensen	2	5
(Australia) S Draper	6^{3}	6	3
(Australia) M Tebbutt	7^{7}	4	6
(Colombia) M Hadad	1	3
6	(Spain) F Mantilla	6	6

Second round
1	(Australia) M Woodforde	4	7^{8}	4
(Australia) R Fromberg	6	6^{6}	6
(United States) C Woodruff	6	3	6
(Ecuador) L Morejón	4	6	1
4	(Argentina) J Frana	6	6
(Australia) P Rafter	4	2
(Australia) M Tebbutt	6	4	7^{10}
6	(Spain) F Mantilla	4	6	6^{8}

Quarterfinals
(Australia) R Fromberg	4	4
(United States) C Woodruff	6	6
4	(Argentina) J Frana	6	6
(Australia) M Tebbutt	4	4

Semifinals
(United States) C Woodruff	6	6
4	(Argentina) J Frana	4	2

=== Bottom half ===
First round
5	(Morocco) K Alami	3	2
(United States) V Spadea	6	6
Q	(United States) W McGuire	7	6^{9}	6^{8}
(Ecuador) N Lapentti	5	7^{11}	7^{10}
Q	(United States) F Montana	3	6	6
(Sweden) M Wilander	6	4	3
(Belgium) K Goossens	4	2
3	(Sweden) M Gustafsson	6	6
7	(Australia) J Stoltenberg	7^{7}	6
(Belgium) J van Herck	6^{5}	0
(Germany) P Baur	2	4
(France) G Raoux	6	6
(Australia) S Stolle	6	6
WC	(United States) D Johnson	4	4
WC	(United States) I Baron	3	3
2	(Australia) T Woodbridge	6	6

Second round
(United States) V Spadea	7	4	4
(Ecuador) N Lapentti	5	6	2^{r}
Q	(United States) F Montana	1	7^{8}	2
3	(Sweden) M Gustafsson	6	6^{6}	6
7	(Australia) J Stoltenberg	6	6
(France) G Raoux	2	3
(Australia) S Stolle	6	7^{7}
2	(Australia) T Woodbridge	3	6^{4}

Quarterfinals
(United States) V Spadea	4	0
3	(Sweden) M Gustafsson	6	6
7	(Australia) J Stoltenberg	6	6
(Australia) S Stolle	4	4

Semifinals
3	(Sweden) M Gustafsson	3	6	2
7	(Australia) J Stoltenberg	6	3	6
