= 1996 America's Red Clay Court Championships =

- Date: May 13–19
- Edition: 4th
- Category: World Series
- Draw: 32S / 16D
- Prize money: $245,000
- Surface: Clay / outdoor
- Location: Coral Springs, Florida, U.S.
- Venue: Sportsplex

Champions

Singles
- (Australia) Jason Stoltenberg

Doubles
- (Australia) Todd Woodbridge / (Australia) Mark Woodforde
- Delray Beach Open

The 1996 America's Red Clay Court Championships was a men's tennis tournament played on outdoor clay courts at the Sportsplex in Coral Springs, Florida in the United States and was part of the World Series of the 1996 ATP Tour. It was the fourth edition of the tournament and took place from May 13 through May 19, 1996. Seventh-seeded Jason Stoltenberg won the singles title.

== Finals ==
=== Singles ===
(Australia) Jason Stoltenberg defeated (United States) Chris Woodruff 7–6^{(7–4)}, 2–6, 7–5

- It was Stoltenberg's only singles title of the year and the 3rd of his career.

=== Doubles ===
(Australia) Todd Woodbridge / (Australia) Mark Woodforde defeated (United States) Ivan Baron / (United States) Brett Hansen-Dent 6–3, 6–3

- It was Woodbridge's 6th title of the year and the 46th of his career. It was Woodforde's 7th title of the year and the 50th of his career.
