= 1996 Singapore Open – Doubles =

Doubles
- 1996 Singapore Open

Final
- Champions: (Australia) Todd Woodbridge (Australia) Mark Woodforde
- Runners-up: (Czech Republic) Martin Damm (Russia) Andrei Olhovskiy
- Score: 7–6, 7–6

Details
- Draw: 16
- Seeds: 4

Events
Singles	Doubles
Singapore Open	· 1997 →

Todd Woodbridge and Mark Woodforde won in the final 7–6, 7–6 against Martin Damm and Andrei Olhovskiy.

== Seeds ==
Champion seeds are indicated in bold text while text in italics indicates the round in which those seeds were eliminated.

1. (Australia) **Todd Woodbridge** / (Australia) **Mark Woodforde (champions)**
2. (Netherlands) Paul Haarhuis / (The Bahamas) Mark Knowles (semifinals)
3. (Zimbabwe) Byron Black / (United States) Jonathan Stark (first round)
4. (Czech Republic) Martin Damm / (Russia) Andrei Olhovskiy (final)

== Draw ==
=== Key ===
- Q = Qualifier
- WC = Wild card
- LL = Lucky loser
- Alt = Alternate
- SE = Special exempt
- PR = Protected ranking
- ITF = ITF entry
- JE = Junior exempt
- w/o = Walkover
- r = Retired
- d = Defaulted
- SR = Special ranking

First round
1	(Australia) **T Woodbridge** (Australia) **M Woodforde**	**6**	**6**
(United States) K Kinnear (The Bahamas) R Smith	1	4
(India) M Bhupathi (India) L Paes	3	4
(Australia) **J Eagle** (Australia) **A Florent**	**6**	**6**
3	(Zimbabwe) B Black (United States) J Stark	4	**7**	3
(South Africa) **D Adams** (Netherlands) **S Schalken**	**6**	6	**6**
Q	(South Africa) **N Godwin** (South Africa) **G Stafford**	**6**	**6**
WC	(Australia) P Cash (Australia) S Draper	4	4
(United Kingdom) M Petchey (United States) V Spadea	**6**	3	4
(Argentina) **J Frana** (Venezuela) **N Pereira**	4	**6**	**6**
(France) J-P Fleurian (France) G Raoux	4	3
4	(Czech Republic) **M Damm** (Russia) **A Olhovskiy**	**6**	**6**
(Canada) **S Lareau** (United States) **B MacPhie**	**6**	3	**6**
(Germany) P Kühnen (South Africa) G Muller	3	**6**	2
WC	(United States) C Chang (United States) M Chang	3	4
2	(Netherlands) **P Haarhuis** (The Bahamas) **M Knowles**	**6**	**6**

Quarterfinals
1	(Australia) **T Woodbridge** (Australia) **M Woodforde**	4	**6**	**6**
(Australia) J Eagle (Australia) A Florent	**6**	4	3
(South Africa) D Adams (Netherlands) S Schalken	1	3
Q	(South Africa) **N Godwin** (South Africa) **G Stafford**	**6**	**6**
(Argentina) J Frana (Venezuela) N Pereira	5	**7**	2
4	(Czech Republic) **M Damm** (Russia) **A Olhovskiy**	**7**	6	**6**
(Canada) S Lareau (United States) B MacPhie	4	3
2	(Netherlands) **P Haarhuis** (The Bahamas) **M Knowles**	**6**	**6**

Semifinals
1	(Australia) **T Woodbridge** (Australia) **M Woodforde**	**7**	4	**6**
Q	(South Africa) N Godwin (South Africa) G Stafford	5	**6**	2
4	(Czech Republic) **M Damm** (Russia) **A Olhovskiy**	**7**	**6**
2	(Netherlands) P Haarhuis (The Bahamas) M Knowles	6	4

Final
1	(Australia) **Todd Woodbridge** (Australia) **Mark Woodforde**	**7**	**7**
4	(Czech Republic) Martin Damm (Russia) Andrei Olhovskiy	6	6
