= 1996 Singapore Open – Singles =

Singles
- 1996 Singapore Open

Final
- Champion: (United States) Jonathan Stark
- Runner-up: (United States) Michael Chang
- Score: 6–4, 6–4

Details
- Draw: 32
- Seeds: 8

Events
Singles	Doubles
Singapore Open	· 1997 →

Jonathan Stark won in the final 6–4, 6–4 against Michael Chang.

== Seeds ==
A champion seed is indicated in bold text while text in italics indicates the round in which that seed was eliminated.

1. (United States) Michael Chang (final)
2. (Netherlands) Richard Krajicek (quarterfinals)
3. (Netherlands) Paul Haarhuis (first round)
4. (Australia) Mark Woodforde (second round)
5. (Australia) Todd Woodbridge (first round)
6. (Netherlands) Sjeng Schalken (second round)
7. (Zimbabwe) Byron Black (second round)
8. (Germany) Hendrik Dreekmann (first round)

== Draw ==
=== Key ===
- Q = Qualifier
- WC = Wild card
- LL = Lucky loser
- Alt = Alternate
- SE = Special exempt
- PR = Protected ranking
- ITF = ITF entry
- JE = Junior exempt
- w/o = Walkover
- r = Retired
- d = Defaulted
- SR = Special ranking

First round
1	(United States) **M Chang**	**6**	**6**
(Netherlands) D v Scheppingen	0	3
(Venezuela) **N Pereira**	**6**	**7^{7}**
(Brazil) G Kuerten	1	6^{2}
LL	(South Africa) N Godwin	3	3
(France) **G Raoux**	**6**	**6**
(Argentina) **J Frana**	**6**	4	**7**
8	(Germany) H Dreekmann	3	**6**	5
3	(Netherlands) P Haarhuis	3	2
LL	(Sweden) **P Fredriksson**	**6**	**6**
WC	(Thailand) T Srichaphan	2	0
(Russia) **A Olhovskiy**	**6**	**6**
(Czech Republic) M Damm	6^{6}	0
(South Africa) **G Stafford**	**7^{8}**	**6**
(United Kingdom) **G Rusedski**	**6**	**6**
5	(Australia) T Woodbridge	4	1
6	(Netherlands) **S Schalken**	**6**	**6**
WC	(Sweden) M Wilander	2	2
(France) J-P Fleurian	**7**	3	3
Q	(United States) **J Stark**	5	**6**	**6**
(Denmark) K Carlsen	5	3
Q	(Germany) **M Sinner**	**7**	**6**
(United States) V Spadea	5	**7^{7}**	1
4	(Australia) **M Woodforde**	**7**	6^{4}	**6**
7	(Zimbabwe) **B Black**	**7^{7}**	**6**
(United States) M Joyce	6^{2}	4
(Sweden) **T Johansson**	**6**	3	**6**
(Australia) S Draper	4	**6**	3
(Japan) S Matsuoka	4	2
(Australia) **P Rafter**	**6**	**6**
Q	(Italy) N Bruno	6^{3}	3
WC/2	(Netherlands) **R Krajicek**	**7^{7}**	**6**

Second round
1	(United States) **M Chang**	**6**	**6**
(Venezuela) N Pereira	3	1
(France) G Raoux	4	**7^{7}**	6^{5}
(Argentina) **J Frana**	**6**	6^{4}	**7^{7}**
LL	(Sweden) P Fredriksson	5	2
(Russia) **A Olhovskiy**	**7**	**6**
(South Africa) G Stafford	6^{1}	4
(United Kingdom) **G Rusedski**	**7^{7}**	**6**
6	(Netherlands) S Schalken	6^{8}	5
Q	(United States) **J Stark**	**7^{10}**	**7**
Q	(Germany) **M Sinner**	**6**	**6**
4	(Australia) M Woodforde	2	3
7	(Zimbabwe) B Black	0	6^{7}
(Sweden) **T Johansson**	**6**	**7^{9}**
(Australia) P Rafter	4	2
WC/2	(Netherlands) **R Krajicek**	**6**	**6**

Quarterfinals
1	(United States) **M Chang**	**6**	**6**
(Argentina) J Frana	4	1
(Russia) A Olhovskiy	6^{4}	2
(United Kingdom) **G Rusedski**	**7^{7}**	**6**
Q	(United States) **J Stark**	**7^{7}**	**7^{7}**
Q	(Germany) M Sinner	6^{5}	6^{3}
(Sweden) **T Johansson**	5	**7^{7}**
WC/2	(Netherlands) R Krajicek	**7**	6^{3}	r

Semifinals
1	(United States) **M Chang**	**7^{7}**	**6**
(United Kingdom) G Rusedski	6^{5}	3
Q	(United States) **J Stark**	3	**6**	**6**
(Sweden) T Johansson	**6**	2	4

Final
1	(United States) Michael Chang	4	4
Q	(United States) **Jonathan Stark**	**6**	**6**
