= Brett Hansen-Dent =

American tennis player

- Country (sports): United States
- Born: July 2, 1972 (age 54) Newport Beach, California, U.S.
- Height: 6 ft 0 in (1.83 m)
- Turned pro: 1995
- Plays: Right-handed
- Prize money: $58,580

Singles
- Career record: 0–1
- Career titles: 0
- Highest ranking: No. 326 (June 24, 1996)

Grand Slam singles results
- US Open: 1R (1995)

Doubles
- Career record: 11–16
- Career titles: 0
- Highest ranking: No. 92 (November 4, 1996)

Grand Slam doubles results
- Australian Open: 1R (1997)
- US Open: 2R (1995)
Medal record
Representing United States
Summer Universiade
Gold medal – first place	1991 Sheffield	Mixed doubles

Brett Hansen-Dent (born July 2, 1972) is a former professional tennis player from the United States.

== Personal life ==
Hansen-Dent is the son of American tennis player Betty Ann Grubb Stuart, half-brother of former tennis professional Taylor Dent and a step-son of Australian Davis Cup player Phil Dent. When he was 10, the family moved to Australia, where they lived for four years, before returning to California. He went to school at Newport Harbor High.

== Career ==
Hansen-Dent was a mixed doubles gold medalist at the 1991 Summer Universiade in Sheffield, partnering Susan Gilchrist. He was also a member of the American squad which competed at the Pan American Games that year, in Havana, Cuba.

In 1991 and 1992, Hansen-Dent played collegiate tennis for the University of California, Irvine, then spent a year away touring.

While at the University of Southern California in 1994, Hansen-Dent was a doubles All-American and member of the NCAA championship winning team. In 1995 he was the Division I singles runner-up (to Sargis Sargsian) and earned All-American honours again, for both singles and doubles.

Hansen-Dent was given a wildcard at the 1995 US Open and played Russian Alexander Volkov in a first round match, which he lost in straight sets. He did however make the second round in the men's doubles, with Jonathan Leach. They defeated the Dutch pairing of Richard Krajicek and Jan Siemerink. His two other Grand Slam appearances were both in the men's doubles, at the 1996 US Open (with T.J. Middleton) and 1997 Australian Open (with Brian MacPhie. He was unable to get past the opening round in either tournament.

During his professional career, he played mainly as a doubles specialist and had his best year on the doubles tour in 1996. He won three Challenger titles that year, made the quarter-finals at the Austrian Open, semi-finals of the Grolsch Open and with Ivan Baron was a runner-up at the America's Red Clay Court Championships in Coral Springs.

Hansen-Dent was unable to repeat these efforts in 1997 due to a knee injury, which required surgery.

== ATP career finals ==
=== Doubles: 1 (0–1) ===
Result	W/L	Date	Tournament	Surface	Partner	Opponents	Score
Loss	0–1	May 1996	Coral Springs, United States	Clay	(United States) Ivan Baron	(Australia) Todd Woodbridge (Australia) Mark Woodforde	3–6, 3–6

== Challenger titles ==
=== Doubles: (3) ===
No.	Year	Tournament	Surface	Partner	Opponents	Score
1.	1996	Indian Wells, United States	Hard	(United States) Brian MacPhie	(Australia) Jason Stoltenberg (Australia) Peter Tramacchi	6–3, 6–4
2.	1996	Cali, Colombia	Clay	(United States) T.J. Middleton	(Argentina) Lucas Arnold Ker (Argentina) Patricio Arnold	6–4, 6–3
3.	1996	Bogotá, Colombia	Clay	(United States) T.J. Middleton	(Mexico) Leonardo Lavalle (Mexico) Oscar Ortiz	6–4, 6–3
