= Ivan Baron (tennis) =

American tennis player

- Country (sports): United States
- Residence: Plantation, Florida
- Born: November 12, 1972 (age 53) Jacksonville, Florida
- Height: 6 ft 1 in (185 cm)
- Turned pro: 1991
- Plays: Right-handed
- Prize money: $128,779

Singles
- Career record: 1–10
- Career titles: 0
- Highest ranking: No. 218 (June 19, 1995)

Grand Slam singles results
- US Open: 1R (1990, 1993)

Doubles
- Career record: 9–14
- Career titles: 0
- Highest ranking: No. 156 (July 10, 1995)

Grand Slam doubles results
- US Open: 1R (1990, 1993, 1994)

Ivan Baron (born November 12, 1972) is an American former professional tennis player.

== Career ==
Baron was seeded 6th at the 1989 Boys' Junior National Tennis Championship Boys' 18 singles but was ousted in the 1st round by Hector Nevares. He and Will Bull then lost to Steve Campbell and Rick Witsken in the 3rd round of the Boys' 18 doubles. His best year on the junior circuit was in 1990, when he won the Italian Open, reached the quarterfinals at the French Open and the semi-finals at Wimbledon.

At the 1990 US Open, Baron took part in the men's singles, men's doubles (with Michael Flanagan), and mixed doubles (with Lisa Raymond) as a wildcard. He lost in straight sets to Fabrice Santoro in the men's singles, and failed to make it past the 1st round in either doubles.

When he returned to the US Open main draw in 1993, it was as a qualifier. He lost in four sets to Renzo Furlan in the 1st round and also exited in the 1st round of the doubles, partnering with Michael Joyce. In the 1994 US Open, Baron appeared only in the doubles, with Martin Blackman. They lost in the opening round.

Baron had a win over then world number 11, Magnus Larsson, at the 1995 International Tennis Championships, in Coral Springs. He and Brett Hansen-Dent were doubles runners-up at the same event the following year.

== ATP career finals ==
=== Doubles: 1 (0–1) ===
Result	W/L	Date	Tournament	Surface	Partner	Opponents	Score
Loss	0–1	May 1996	Coral Springs, United States	Clay	(United States) Brett Hansen-Dent	(Australia) Todd Woodbridge (Australia) Mark Woodforde	3–6, 3–6

== Challenger titles ==
=== Doubles: (3) ===
No.	Year	Tournament	Surface	Partner	Opponents	Score
1.	1994	Brasília, Brazil	Hard	(United States) Bill Barber	(Brazil) Nelson Aerts (Brazil) Danilo Marcelino	6–0, 7–5
2.	1995	Quito, Ecuador	Clay	(United States) Ian Williams	(Ecuador) Pablo Campana (Ecuador) Nicolás Lapentti	6–3, 2–6, 6–3
3.	1995	Beijing, China	Hard	(Portugal) João Cunha-Silva	(Italy) Laurence Tieleman (Germany) Martin Zumpft	6–4, 6–4
