= Albert Costa career statistics =

Career finals
Discipline	Type	Won	Lost	Total
Singles	Grand Slam	1	–	1
Singles	ATP Finals	–	–	–
Singles	ATP 1000	1	2	3
Singles	ATP 500	2	2	4
Singles	ATP 250	8	5	13
Singles	Olympics	–	–	–
Singles	Total	12	9	21
Doubles	Grand Slam	–	–	–
Doubles	ATP Finals	–	–	–
Doubles	ATP 1000 ^{2}	–	–	–
Doubles	ATP 500	–	–	–
Doubles	ATP 250	1	–	1
Doubles	Olympics	–	–	–
Doubles	Total	1	–	1

This is an (incomplete) list of main career statistics page of Spanish professional tennis player Albert Costa.

== Significant finals ==
=== Grand Slam finals ===
==== Singles: 1 (1–0) ====
Result	Year	Championship	Surface	Opponent	Score
Win	2002	French Open	Clay	(Spain) Juan Carlos Ferrero	6–1, 6–0, 4–6, 6–3

=== Masters Series finals ===
==== Singles: 3 (1–2) ====
Result	Date	Tournament	Surface	Opponent	Score
Loss	1996	Monte Carlo	Clay	(Austria) Thomas Muster	3–6, 7–5, 6–4, 3–6, 2–6
Loss	1998	Rome	Clay	(Chile) Marcelo Ríos	walkover
Win	1998	Hamburg	Clay	(Spain) Àlex Corretja	6–2, 6–0, 1–0, retired

== ATP career finals ==
=== Singles: 21 (12 titles, 9 runners-up) ===
Legend Grand Slam (1–0) Tennis Masters Cup (0–0) ATP Super 9 / ATP Masters Series (1–2) ATP Championship Series / ATP International Series Gold (2–2) ATP World Series / ATP International Series (8–5)	Titles by surface Hard (0–1) Grass (0–0) Clay (12–8) Carpet (0–0)

Result	W/L	Date	Category	Tournament	Surface	Opponent	Score
Loss	0–1	Mar 1995	World Series	Grand Prix Hassan II, Morocco	Clay	(Austria) Gilbert Schaller	4–6, 2–6
Loss	0–2	Apr 1995	World Series	Estoril Open, Portugal	Clay	(Austria) Thomas Muster	4–6, 2–6
Win	1–2	Aug 1995	World Series	Austrian Open Kitzbühel, Austria	Clay	(Austria) Thomas Muster	4–6, 6–4, 7–6^{(7–3)}, 2–6, 6–4
Loss	1–3	Feb 1996	World Series	Dubai Championships, UAE	Hard	(Croatia) Goran Ivanišević	4–6, 3–6
Loss	1–4	Apr 1996	Super 9	Monte-Carlo Masters, Monaco	Clay	(Austria) Thomas Muster	3–6, 7–5, 6–4, 3–6, 2–6
Win	2–4	Jul 1996	World Series	Swiss Open, Switzerland	Clay	(Spain) Félix Mantilla	4–6, 7–6^{(7–2)}, 6–1, 6–0
Win	3–4	Aug 1996	World Series	San Marino Open, San Marino	Clay	(Spain) Félix Mantilla	7–6^{(9–7)}, 6–3
Win	4–4	Sep 1996	World Series	Bournemouth International, UK	Clay	(Germany) Marc-Kevin Goellner	6–7^{(4–7)}, 6–2, 6–2
Win	5–4	Apr 1997	Champ. Series	Barcelona Open, Spain	Clay	(Spain) Albert Portas	7–5, 6–4, 6–4
Win	6–4	Sep 1997	World Series	Marbella Open, Spain	Clay	(Spain) Alberto Berasategui	6–3, 6–2
Win	7–4	May 1998	Super 9	German Open, Germany	Clay	(Spain) Àlex Corretja	6–2, 6–0, 1–0 retired
Loss	7–5	May 1998	Super 9	Italian Open, Italy	Clay	(Chile) Marcelo Ríos	Walkover
Win	8–5	Aug 1998	World Series	Austrian Open Kitzbühel, Austria	Clay	(Italy) Andrea Gaudenzi	6–2, 1–6, 6–2, 3–6, 6–1
Loss	8–6	Sep 1998	World Series	Bournemouth International, UK	Clay	(Spain) Félix Mantilla	3–6, 5–7
Win	9–6	Apr 1999	World Series	Estoril Open, Portugal	Clay	(United States) Todd Martin	7–6^{(7–4)}, 2–6, 6–3
Win	10–6	Jul 1999	World Series	Swiss Open, Switzerland	Clay	(Ecuador) Nicolás Lapentti	7–6^{(7–4)}, 6–3, 6–4
Win	11–6	Aug 1999	Champ. Series	Austrian Open Kitzbühel, Austria	Clay	(Spain) Fernando Vicente	7–5, 6–2, 6–7^{(5–7)}, 7–6^{(7–4)}
Loss	11–7	Jul 2001	Int. Series Gold	Austrian Open Kitzbühel, Austria	Clay	(Ecuador) Nicolás Lapentti	6–1, 4–6, 5–7, 5–7
Loss	11–8	Apr 2002	Int. Series Gold	Barcelona Open, Spain	Clay	(Argentina) Gastón Gaudio	4–6, 0–6, 2–6
Win	12–8	Jun 2002	Grand Slam	French Open, France	Clay	(Spain) Juan Carlos Ferrero	6–1, 6–0, 4–6, 6–3
Loss	12–9	Jul 2002	Int. Series	Dutch Open, Netherlands	Clay	(Argentina) Juan Ignacio Chela	1–6, 6–7^{(4–7)}

=== Doubles: 1 (1 title) ===
Legend
Grand Slam (0–0)
Tennis Masters Cup (0–0)
ATP Super 9 /
ATP Masters Series (0–0)
ATP Championship Series /
ATP International Series Gold (0–0)
ATP World Series /
ATP International Series (1–0)

| class="col-break " style=" padding-left: 1em;" |

Titles by surface
Hard (1–0)
Grass (0–0)
Clay (0–0)
Carpet (0–0)

Result	W/L	Date	Category	Tournament	Surface	Partner	Opponents	Score
Win	1–0	Jan 2005	Int. Series	Qatar Open, Qatar	Hard	(Spain) Rafael Nadal	(Romania) Andrei Pavel (Russia) Mikhail Youzhny	6–3, 4–6, 6–3

== Performance timelines ==
=== Singles ===
Key
W	F	SF	QF	#R	RR	Q#	P#	DNQ	A	Z#	PO	G	S	B	NMS	NTI	P	NH

(W) winner; (F) finalist; (SF) semifinalist; (QF) quarterfinalist; (#R) rounds 4, 3, 2, 1; (RR) round-robin stage; (Q#) qualification round; (P#) preliminary round; (DNQ) did not qualify; (A) absent; (Z#) Davis/Fed Cup Zonal Group (with number indication) or (PO) play-off; (G) gold, (S) silver or (B) bronze Olympic/Paralympic medal; (NMS) not a Masters tournament; (NTI) not a Tier I tournament; (P) postponed; (NH) not held; (SR) strike rate (events won / competed); (W–L) win–loss record.
To avoid confusion and double counting, these charts are updated at the conclusion of a tournament or when the player's participation has ended.

	Professional career															
Tournament	1993	1994	1995	1996	1997	1998	1999	2000	2001	2002	2003	2004	2005	2006	SR	W–L
Grand Slam tournaments
Australian Open	A	A	A	2R	QF	2R	1R	1R	A	4R	3R	3R	1R	A	0 / 9	13–9
French Open	A	1R	QF	2R	3R	4R	3R	QF	1R	W	SF	3R	1R	A	1 / 12	30–11
Wimbledon	A	1R	A	2R	A	2R	1R	A	A	A	A	1R	A	A	0 / 5	2–5
US Open	A	1R	A	1R	1R	1R	1R	2R	4R	2R	2R	1R	1R	A	0 / 11	6–11
Win–loss	0–0	0–3	4–1	3–4	6–3	5–4	2–4	5–3	3–2	11–2	8–3	4–4	0–3	0–0	1 / 37	51–36
Year-End Championship
Tennis Masters Cup	did not qualify					RR	did not qualify			RR	did not qualify				0 / 2	1–4
National Representation
Summer Olympics	not held			2R	not held			1R	not held			A	not held		0 / 2	1–2
Davis Cup	A	A	A	PO	QF	A	PO	W	A	A	F	A	PO	A	1 / 6	9–5
ATP Masters Series
Indian Wells	A	A	1R	3R	1R	2R	1R	3R	1R	2R	2R	3R	A	A	0 / 10	8–10
Key Biscayne	A	A	A	2R	2R	3R	4R	2R	2R	2R	SF	2R	A	A	0 / 9	11–9
Monte Carlo	A	2R	1R	F	3R	3R	QF	QF	3R	QF	2R	1R	2R	A	0 / 12	22–12
Rome	A	2R	1R	SF	3R	F	1R	QF	1R	QF	3R	SF	2R	A	0 / 12	25–11
Hamburg	A	A	2R	2R	QF	W	2R	1R	SF	2R	2R	3R	2R	A	1 / 11	19–10
Toronto / Montreal	A	A	A	A	A	3R	A	A	3R	1R	A	A	A	A	0 / 3	4–3
Cincinnati	A	A	A	A	SF	2R	2R	1R	1R	2R	1R	A	A	A	0 / 7	7–7
Stuttgart / Madrid	A	A	A	1R	A	1R	2R	2R	2R	A	2R	2R	1R	A	0 / 8	5–8
Paris	A	A	A	1R	A	1R	3R	QF	3R	2R	2R	A	A	A	0 / 7	8–7
Win–loss	0–0	2–2	1–4	13–7	11–6	19–7	9–8	12–8	11–9	9–8	11–8	8–6	3–4	0–0	1 / 79	109–77
Career statistics
Finals	0	0	3	5	2	4	3	0	1	3	0	0	0	0	21	
Titles	0	0	1	3	2	2	3	0	0	1	0	0	0	0	12	
Hard win–loss	0–0	0–1	1–3	17–12	19–11	12–14						6–10	3–5	0–0	112–113	
Clay win–loss	2–2	15–16	32–18	34–11	25–7	34–8						14–12	10–12	2–2	271–137	
Grass win–loss	0–0	0–1	0–0	1–3	0–0	1–1	0–1	0–0	0–0	0–0	0–0	0–1	0–0	0–0	2–7	
Carpet win–loss	0–0	0–0	0–1	0–3	0–4	0–2	0–1	0–1	0–1	0–2	0–0	0–1	0–0	0–0	0–16	
Overall win–loss	2–2	15–18	33–22	52–29	44–22	47–25	40–22	32–26	26–22	35–22	24–20	20–24	13–17	2–2	383–272	
Win %	50%	45%	60%	64%	67%	65%	65%	55%	54%	61%	55%	45%	43%	50%	58.47%	
Year–End Ranking	221	52	24	13	19	14	18	26	40	9	25	56	116	623		

== Top 10 wins ==
Season	1993	1994	1995	1996	1997	1998	1999	2000	2001	2002	2003	2004	2005	2006	Total
Wins	0	1	2	3	5	2	3	4	1	5	1	1	0	0	28

#	Player	Rank	Event	Surface	Rd	Score	Costa Rank
1994
1.	(Spain) Sergi Bruguera	5	Estoril, Portugal	Clay	QF	6–2, 4–3, ret.	159
1995
2.	(Spain) Alberto Berasategui	9	Nice, France	Clay	1R	6–7^{(8–10)}, 6–6, ret.	43
3.	(Austria) Thomas Muster	3	Kitzbühel, Austria	Clay	F	4–6, 6–4, 7–6^{(7–3)}, 2–6, 6–4	27
1996
4.	(United States) Andre Agassi	3	Monte Carlo, Monaco	Clay	3R	6–2, 6–1	26
5.	(United States) Michael Chang	6	Wimbledon, London, United Kingdom	Grass	1R	3–6, 7–6^{(7–5)}, 7–6^{(7–1)}, 6–4	17
6.	(Russia) Yevgeny Kafelnikov	4	Gstaad, Switzerland	Clay	SF	3–6, 6–4, 6–3	18
1997
7.	(South Africa) Wayne Ferreira	10	Australian Open, Melbourne, Australia	Hard	4R	6–3, 6–2, 3–2, ret.	13
8.	(Spain) Carlos Moyá	8	Barcelona, Spain	Clay	SF	7–6^{(8–6)}, 7–5	12
9.	(Russia) Yevgeny Kafelnikov	5	Stuttgart, Germany	Clay	QF	6–4, 6–4	23
10.	(Spain) Àlex Corretja	5	Cincinnati, United States	Hard	3R	6–1, 7–6^{(7–3)}	17
11.	(Spain) Sergi Bruguera	8	Cincinnati, United States	Hard	QF	4–6, 6–3, 5–2, ret.	17
1998
12.	(Slovakia) Karol Kučera	10	Hamburg, Germany	Clay	SF	3–0, ret.	26
13.	(Spain) Àlex Corretja	9	Hamburg, Germany	Clay	F	6–2, 6–0, 1–0, ret.	26
1999
14.	(United States) Todd Martin	8	Estoril, Portugal	Clay	F	7–6^{(7–4)}, 2–6, 6–3	16
15.	(Russia) Yevgeny Kafelnikov	4	Kitzbühel, Austria	Clay	SF	7–6^{(7–5)}, 6–2	22
16.	(United Kingdom) Greg Rusedski	6	Paris, France	Carpet (i)	2R	7–6^{(9–7)}, ret.	24
2000
17.	(Russia) Yevgeny Kafelnikov	3	Davis Cup, Málaga, Spain	Clay	RR	6–0, 6–3, 6–0	14
18.	(Sweden) Thomas Enqvist	7	French Open, Paris, France	Clay	3R	5–7, 7–6^{(7–2)}, 6–1, 3–6, 6–4	18
19.	(Australia) Lleyton Hewitt	9	French Open, Paris, France	Clay	4R	6–3, 4–6, 6–2, 6–4	18
20.	(United Kingdom) Tim Henman	10	Paris, France	Carpet (i)	2R	6–4, 6–4	32
2001
21.	(United Kingdom) Tim Henman	8	Montreal, Canada	Hard	2R	7–6^{(7–3)}, 4–6, 6–1	44
2002
22.	(Spain) Juan Carlos Ferrero	9	Hamburg, Germany	Clay	1R	2–6, 6–3, 6–4	19
23.	(United Kingdom) Tim Henman	6	World Team Cup, Düsseldorf, Germany	Clay	RR	4–6, 6–3, 6–2	22
24.	(Russia) Yevgeny Kafelnikov	5	World Team Cup, Düsseldorf, Germany	Clay	RR	6–3, 7–6^{(8–6)}	22
25.	(Brazil) Gustavo Kuerten	7	French Open, Paris, France	Clay	4R	6–4, 7–5, 6–4	22
26.	(Russia) Marat Safin	3	Tennis Masters Cup, Shanghai, China	Hard (i)	RR	3–6, 6–4, 6–3	11
2003
27.	(Switzerland) Roger Federer	4	Miami, United States	Hard	QF	7–6^{(7–4)}, 4–6, 7–6^{(9–7)}	9
2004
28.	(Switzerland) Roger Federer	1	Rome, Italy	Clay	2R	3–6, 6–3, 6–2	39
