= 1996 Bournemouth International =

- Date: 9-15 September
- Edition: 1st
- Category: World Series
- Draw: 32S / 16D
- Prize money: $375,000
- Surface: Clay / outdoor
- Location: Bournemouth, England
- Venue: West Hants Tennis Club

Champions

Singles
- (Spain) Albert Costa

Doubles
- (Germany) Marc-Kevin Goellner / (United Kingdom) Greg Rusedski
Bournemouth International	· 1997 →

The 1996 Bournemouth International (also known as the 1996 Samsung Open for sponsorship reasons) was a men's tennis tournament played on outdoor clay courts at the West Hants Tennis Club in Bournemouth in England and was part of the World Series of the 1996 ATP Tour. It was the inaugural edition of the tournament and was held from 9 September until 15 September 1996. First-seeded Albert Costa won the singles title.

== Finals ==
=== Singles ===
(Spain) Albert Costa defeated (Germany) Marc-Kevin Goellner 6–7^{(4–7)}, 6–2, 6–2

- It was Costa's 3rd and last singles title of the year and the 4th of his career.

=== Doubles ===
(Germany) Marc-Kevin Goellner / (United Kingdom) Greg Rusedski defeated (France) Rodolphe Gilbert / (Portugal) Nuno Marques 6–3, 7–6

- It was Goellner's 1st title of the year and the 4th of his career. It was Rusedski's 1st title of the year and the 4th of his career.
