= Burtscher =

Burtscher is a surname. Notable people with the surname include:

- Benedikt Burtscher (fl. 1700), the building master of the Huguenot church in Usingen, Germany
- Michael Burtscher (born 1985), Filipino-Swiss basketballer
- Roland Burtscher (born 1969), Austrian tennis player and coach
- Wolfgang Burtscher (fl. 2020–present), the current Director-General for Agriculture and Rural Development of the European Union
