= 1993 RCA Championships – Doubles =

Doubles
- 1993 RCA Championships

Final
- Champion: (United States) Scott Davis (United States) Todd Martin
- Runner-up: (United States) Ken Flach (United States) Rick Leach
- Score: 3–6, 6–3, 6–2

Details
- Draw: 28
- Seeds: 8

Events
| Singles | Doubles |
- Indianapolis Tennis Championships

The 1993 RCA Championships – Doubles was an event of the 1993 RCA Championships men's tennis tournament which was held from August 16 through August 22, 1993, at the Indianapolis Tennis Center in Indianapolis, Indiana, in the United States. The tournament was part of Championship Series of the 1993 ATP Tour. The doubles draw consisted of 28 teams and eight of them were seeded.

Jim Grabb and Richey Reneberg were the defending champions but did not compete in this edition. The unseeded team of Scott Davis and Todd Martin won the doubles title after a 3–6, 6–3, 6–2 victory in the final against the eighth-seeded team of Ken Flach and Rick Leach.

== Seeds ==
1. (United States) Patrick McEnroe / (United States) Richey Reneberg (second round)
2. (Canada) Grant Connell / (United States) Patrick Galbraith (second round)
3. (Netherlands) Jacco Eltingh / (Netherlands) Paul Haarhuis (quarterfinals)
4. (Australia) Mark Kratzmann / (Australia) Wally Masur (quarterfinals)
5. (United States) Jared Palmer / (United States) Jonathan Stark (second round)
6. (South Africa) Danie Visser / (Australia) Laurie Warder (second round)
7. (Canada) Glenn Michibata / (United States) David Pate (first round)
8. (United States) Ken Flach / (United States) Rick Leach (final)

== Draw ==
Key

- Q = Qualifier
- WC = Wild card
- LL = Lucky loser
- Alt = Alternate
- ITF = ITF entry
- PR = Protected ranking
- SR = Special ranking
- SE = Special exempt
- JE = Junior exempt
- JR = Junior Accelerator Programme entrant
- CO = College Accelerator Programme entrant
- NG = Next Gen Accelerator Program entrant
- w/o = Walkover
- r = Retired
- d = Defaulted

=== Finals ===
Semifinals
8 | (United States) Ken Flach (United States) Rick Leach | 6 | 6
Q | (Mexico) Agustín Moreno (Peru) Jaime Yzaga | 3 | 4
(Australia) Pat Rafter (United States) Bryan Shelton | 6 | 6
(United States) Scott Davis (United States) Todd Martin | 7 | 7

Final
8 | (United States) Ken Flach (United States) Rick Leach | 4 | 4
(United States) Scott Davis (United States) Todd Martin | 6 | 6

\

=== Top half ===
First Round
1 | (United States) Patrick McEnroe (United States) Richey Reneberg
BYE; BYE
(United States) Brad Pearce (United States) Dave Randall | 6 | 6
(United States) David DiLucia (United States) Brian MacPhie | 3 | 1
(Germany) Boris Becker (Germany) Markus Zoecke | 6 | 6
(Australia) Jason Stoltenberg (United States) David Wheaton | 4 | 4
(Spain) Tomás Carbonell (Belgium) Libor Pimek | 5 | 4
8 | (United States) Ken Flach (United States) Rick Leach | 7 | 6
3 | (Netherlands) Jacco Eltingh (Netherlands) Paul Haarhuis
BYE; BYE
(United Kingdom) Neil Broad (South Africa) Piet Norval | 4 | 7 | 6
(South Africa) Brent Haygarth (United States) Jim Pugh | 6 | 6 | 4
(United States) Todd Witsken (United States) Rick Witsken | 2 | 2
Q | (Mexico) Agustín Moreno (Peru) Jaime Yzaga | 6 | 6
(United States) Michael Briggs (United States) Trevor Kronemann | 6 | 4 | 4
5 | (United States) Jared Palmer (United States) Jonathan Stark | 2 | 6 | 6

Second Round
1 | (United States) Patrick McEnroe (United States) Richey Reneberg | 6 | 3 | 4
(United States) Brad Pearce (United States) Dave Randall | 4 | 6 | 6
(Germany) Boris Becker (Germany) Markus Zoecke | 1 | 4
8 | (United States) Ken Flach (United States) Rick Leach | 6 | 6
3 | (Netherlands) Jacco Eltingh (Netherlands) Paul Haarhuis | 7 | 6 | 6
(United Kingdom) Neil Broad (South Africa) Piet Norval | 6 | 7 | 3
Q | (Mexico) Agustín Moreno (Peru) Jaime Yzaga | 7 | 6
5 | (United States) Jared Palmer (United States) Jonathan Stark | 6 | 2

Quarterfinals
(United States) Brad Pearce (United States) Dave Randall | 2 | 1
8 | (United States) Ken Flach (United States) Rick Leach | 6 | 6
3 | (Netherlands) Jacco Eltingh (Netherlands) Paul Haarhuis | 6 | 6 | 4
Q | (Mexico) Agustín Moreno (Peru) Jaime Yzaga | 7 | 4 | 6

Semifinals
8 | (United States) Ken Flach (United States) Rick Leach | 6 | 6
Q | (Mexico) Agustín Moreno (Peru) Jaime Yzaga | 3 | 4

=== Bottom half ===
First Round
6 | (South Africa) Danie Visser (Australia) Laurie Warder | 7 | 4 | 7
(United States) Kent Kinnear (United States) Sven Salumaa | 5 | 6 | 6
(Switzerland) Jakob Hlasek (Croatia) Goran Ivanišević | 4 | 6
(Australia) Pat Rafter (United States) Bryan Shelton | 6 | 7
(Australia) John Fitzgerald (Australia) Jamie Morgan | 4 | 7 | 6
Q | (France) Rodolphe Gilbert (France) Guillaume Raoux | 6 | 6 | 7
BYE; BYE
4 | (Australia) Mark Kratzmann (Australia) Wally Masur
7 | (Canada) Glenn Michibata (United States) David Pate | 6 | 5
(United States) Bret Garnett (United States) T. J. Middleton | 7 | 7
(United States) Scott Davis (United States) Todd Martin | 6 | 6
(South Africa) Royce Deppe (The Bahamas) Mark Knowles | 3 | 2
(South Africa) John-Laffnie de Jager (South Africa) Wayne Ferreira | 7 | 7
(Sweden) Rikard Bergh (South Africa) Byron Talbot | 6 | 6
BYE; BYE
2 | (Canada) Grant Connell (United States) Patrick Galbraith

Second Round
6 | (South Africa) Danie Visser (Australia) Laurie Warder | 4 | 6
(Australia) Pat Rafter (United States) Bryan Shelton | 6 | 7
Q | (France) Rodolphe Gilbert (France) Guillaume Raoux | 4 | 7 | 5
4 | (Australia) Mark Kratzmann (Australia) Wally Masur | 6 | 6 | 7
(United States) Bret Garnett (United States) T. J. Middleton | 4 | 3
(United States) Scott Davis (United States) Todd Martin | 6 | 6
(South Africa) John-Laffnie de Jager (South Africa) Wayne Ferreira | 6 | 6 | 6
2 | (Canada) Grant Connell (United States) Patrick Galbraith | 7 | 3 | 4

Quarterfinals
(Australia) Pat Rafter (United States) Bryan Shelton | 3 | 6 | 6
4 | (Australia) Mark Kratzmann (Australia) Wally Masur | 6 | 3 | 2
(United States) Scott Davis (United States) Todd Martin | 3 | 6 | 7
(South Africa) John-Laffnie de Jager (South Africa) Wayne Ferreira | 6 | 3 | 6

Semifinals
(Australia) Pat Rafter (United States) Bryan Shelton | 6 | 6
(United States) Scott Davis (United States) Todd Martin | 7 | 7
