= 1998 Generali Open =

Men's tennis tournament

- Date: 27 July – 2 August
- Edition: 43rd
- Category: International Series
- Draw: 48S / 24D
- Prize money: $500,000
- Surface: Clay / outdoor
- Location: Kitzbühel, Austria

Champions

Singles
- (Spain) Albert Costa

Doubles
- (Netherlands) Tom Kempers / (Argentina) Daniel Orsanic
← 1997 ·	Generali Open	· 1999 →

The 1998 Generali Open was a men's tennis tournament played on outdoor clay courts in Kitzbühel, Austria that was part of the International Series of the 1998 ATP Tour. It was the 43rd edition of the tournament and was held from 27 July until 2 August 1998. Second-seeded Albert Costa won the singles title.

== Finals ==
=== Singles ===
(Spain) Albert Costa defeated (Italy) Andrea Gaudenzi, 6–2, 1–6, 6–2, 3–6, 6–1

- It was Costa's 2nd singles title of the year and the 8th of his career.

=== Doubles ===
(Netherlands) Tom Kempers / (Argentina) Daniel Orsanic defeated (Australia) Joshua Eagle / (Australia) Andrew Kratzmann, 6–3, 6–4
