= 1995 EA Generali Open – Doubles =

Doubles
- 1995 EA Generali Open

Final
- Champions: (United States) Francisco Montana (United States) Greg Van Emburgh
- Runners-up: (Spain) Jordi Arrese (Australia) Wayne Arthurs
- Score: 6–7, 6–3, 7–6

Details
- Draw: 24 (3WC/1Q)
- Seeds: 8

Events
Singles	Doubles
← 1994 ·	Austrian Open Kitzbühel	· 1996 →

David Adams and Andrei Olhovskiy were the defending champions, but none competed this year. Adams chose to compete in Los Angeles during the same week.

Francisco Montana and Greg Van Emburgh won the title by defeating Jordi Arrese and Wayne Arthurs 6–7, 6–3, 7–6 in the final.

== Seeds ==
All seeds receive a bye into the second round.

1. (Spain) Sergio Casal / (Spain) Emilio Sánchez (quarterfinals)
2. (Spain) Jordi Arrese / (Australia) Wayne Arthurs (final)
3. (Austria) Alex Antonitsch / (Netherlands) Tom Nijssen (quarterfinals)
4. (United States) Francisco Montana / (United States) Greg Van Emburgh (champions)
5. (Spain) José Antonio Conde / (United States) Jack Waite (second round)
6. (Italy) Cristian Brandi / (Italy) Andrea Gaudenzi (second round)
7. (United States) Bill Behrens / (United States) Matt Lucena (semifinals)
8. (Australia) Jon Ireland / (Australia) Andrew Kratzmann (second round)

== Draw ==
=== Key ===
- Q = Qualifier
- WC = Wild card
- LL = Lucky loser
- Alt = Alternate
- SE = Special exempt
- PR = Protected ranking
- ITF = ITF entry
- JE = Junior exempt
- w/o = Walkover
- r = Retired
- d = Defaulted
- SR = Special ranking

=== Finals ===
Semifinals
7	(United States) Bill Behrens (United States) Matt Lucena	3	6	3
4	(United States) Francisco Montana (United States) Greg Van Emburgh	6	4	6
(Italy) Diego Nargiso (Italy) Stefano Pescosolido	4	4
2	(Spain) Jordi Arrese (Australia) Wayne Arthurs	6	6

Final
4	(United States) Francisco Montana (United States) Greg Van Emburgh	6	6	7
2	(Spain) Jordi Arrese (Australia) Wayne Arthurs	7	3	6

=== Top half ===
First round
(United States) J Belloli (Netherlands) S Noteboom	6	7
WC	(Austria) T Buchmayer (Austria) G Schaller	3	5
Q	(Sweden) D Ekerot (Austria) U Plamberger	7	6
WC	(Austria) W Schranz (Austria) H Wiltschnig	5	1
(United States) R Devens (South Africa) D Nainkin	6	3
(Latvia) Ģ Dzelde (Czech Republic) T Zdražila	7	6
(Argentina) P Albano (Uruguay) M Filippini	6	6
(Sweden) O Kristiansson (Sweden) LA Wahlgren	1	4

Second round
1	(Spain) S Casal (Spain) E Sánchez	6	6
(United States) J Belloli (Netherlands) S Noteboom	3	2
Q	(Sweden) D Ekerot (Austria) U Plamberger	5	3
7	(United States) B Behrens (United States) M Lucena	7	6
4	(United States) F Montana (United States) G Van Emburgh	2	6	6
(Latvia) Ģ Dzelde (Czech Republic) T Zdražila	6	3	3
(Argentina) P Albano (Uruguay) M Filippini	6	6
6	(Italy) C Brandi (Italy) A Gaudenzi	4	4

Quarterfinals
1	(Spain) S Casal (Spain) E Sánchez	4	4
7	(United States) B Behrens (United States) M Lucena	6	6
4	(United States) F Montana (United States) G Van Emburgh	6	6
(Argentina) P Albano (Uruguay) M Filippini	3	3

Semifinals
7	(United States) B Behrens (United States) M Lucena	3	6	3
4	(United States) F Montana (United States) G Van Emburgh	6	4	6

=== Bottom half ===
First round
(Argentina) C Miniussi (Uruguay) D Pérez	1	4
(Italy) D Nargiso (Italy) S Pescosolido	6	6
WC	(Austria) M Hipfl (Austria) C Trimmel	3	5
(United States) B Dickinson (New Zealand) G Wilson	6	7
(Romania) A Pavel (Israel) E Ran	3	3
(Portugal) E Couto (Portugal) B Mota	6	6
(Spain) E Benfele Álvarez (Spain) P Imaz	6	6
(Italy) R Furlan (Italy) F Mordegan	4	4

Second round
5	(Spain) JA Conde (United States) J Waite	2	4
(Italy) D Nargiso (Italy) S Pescosolido	6	6
(United States) B Dickinson (New Zealand) G Wilson	5	4
3	(Austria) A Antonitsch (Netherlands) T Nijssen	7	6
8	(Australia) J Ireland (Australia) A Kratzmann	4	4
(Portugal) E Couto (Portugal) B Mota	6	6
(Spain) E Benfele Álvarez (Spain) P Imaz	3	6	6
2	(Spain) J Arrese (Australia) W Arthurs	6	4	7

Quarterfinals
(Italy) D Nargiso (Italy) S Pescosolido	6	5	7
3	(Austria) A Antonitsch (Netherlands) T Nijssen	3	7	5
(Portugal) E Couto (Portugal) B Mota	6	6	6
2	(Spain) J Arrese (Australia) W Arthurs	7	3	7

Semifinals
(Italy) D Nargiso (Italy) S Pescosolido	4	4
2	(Spain) J Arrese (Australia) W Arthurs	6	6
