= 1994 EA Generali Open – Singles =

Singles
- 1994 EA Generali Open

Final
- Champion: (Croatia) Goran Ivanišević
- Runner-up: (France) Fabrice Santoro
- Score: 6–2, 4–6, 4–6, 6–3, 6–2

Details
- Draw: 48 (4WC/6Q)
- Seeds: 16

Events
Singles	Doubles
- Austrian Open Kitzbühel

Thomas Muster was the defending champion, but lost in the semifinals to Fabrice Santoro.

First-seeded Goran Ivanišević won the title by defeating Santoro 6–2, 4–6, 4–6, 6–3, 6–2 in the final.

== Seeds ==
All seeds received a bye to the second round.

1. (Croatia) Goran Ivanišević (champion)
2. (Austria) Thomas Muster (semifinals)
3. (Italy) Andrea Gaudenzi (second round)
4. (Spain) Javier Sánchez (quarterfinals)
5. (Austria) Gilbert Schaller (quarterfinals)
6. (Italy) Renzo Furlan (third round)
7. (Haiti) Ronald Agénor (third round)
8. (Germany) Bernd Karbacher (second round)
9. (Australia) Richard Fromberg (third round)
10. (Russia) Andrei Cherkasov (second round)
11. (Austria) Horst Skoff (second round)
12. (Spain) Tomás Carbonell (semifinals)
13. (Spain) Jordi Arrese (third round)
14. (Uruguay) Marcelo Filippini (second round)
15. (Morocco) Younes El Aynaoui (second round)
16. (Spain) Francisco Clavet (third round)

== Draw ==
Key

- Q = Qualifier
- WC = Wild card
- LL = Lucky loser
- Alt = Alternate
- ITF = ITF entry
- PR = Protected ranking
- SR = Special ranking
- SE = Special exempt
- JE = Junior exempt
- JR = Junior Accelerator Programme entrant
- CO = College Accelerator Programme entrant
- NG = Next Gen Accelerator Program entrant
- w/o = Walkover
- r = Retired
- d = Defaulted

=== Finals ===
Quarterfinals
1	(Croatia) Goran Ivanišević	6	6
(Brazil) Fernando Meligeni	3	4
4	(Spain) Javier Sánchez	6	2	3
12	(Spain) Tomás Carbonell	3	6	6
5	(Austria) Gilbert Schaller	6	3	2
(France) Fabrice Santoro	4	6	6
(Germany) Oliver Gross	2	3
2	(Austria) Thomas Muster	6	6

Semifinals
1	(Croatia) Goran Ivanišević	7^{7}	6
12	(Spain) Tomás Carbonell	6^{4}	0
(France) Fabrice Santoro	2	7^{8}	7^{7}
2	(Austria) Thomas Muster	6	6^{6}	6^{4}

Final
1	(Croatia) Goran Ivanišević	6	4	4	6	6
(France) Fabrice Santoro	2	6	6	3	2

=== Top half ===
==== Section 1 ====
First round
Q	(Spain) Á Calatrava	6^{1}	0
WC	(Austria) H Wiltschnig	7^{7}	6
(Spain) E Sánchez	5	4
Q	(Spain) E Benfele Álvarez	7	6
(Italy) D Nargiso	7^{7}	6^{6}	6^{6}
Q	(Austria) R Burtscher	6^{2}	7^{8}	7^{8}
(Chile) S Cortés	1	5
(Brazil) F Meligeni	6	7

Second round
1	(Croatia) G Ivanišević	6	6
WC	(Austria) H Wiltschnig	4	4
Q	(Spain) E Benfele Álvarez	7^{9}	2	4
16	(Spain) F Clavet	6^{7}	6	6
9	(Australia) R Fromberg	7	6
Q	(Austria) R Burtscher	5	1
(Brazil) F Meligeni	6	6
8	(Germany) B Karbacher	4	4

Third round
1	(Croatia) G Ivanišević	6	6
16	(Spain) F Clavet	2	4
9	(Australia) R Fromberg	2	4
(Brazil) F Meligeni	6	6

Quarterfinals
1	(Croatia) G Ivanišević	6	6
(Brazil) F Meligeni	3	4

==== Section 2 ====
First round
(Germany) P Baur	6	6
(Spain) G Puentes	1	4
(Belgium) X Daufresne	1	0
Q	(Italy) M Ardinghi	6	6
(Russia) A Olhovskiy	7	6
(Sweden) T Nydahl	5	3
Q	(Georgia (country)) V Gabrichidze	3	6	5
(Ukraine) D Poliakov	6	4	7

Second round
4	(Spain) J Sánchez	6	7^{7}
(Germany) P Baur	4	6^{3}
Q	(Italy) M Ardinghi	4	3
13	(Spain) J Arrese	6	6
12	(Spain) T Carbonell	6	3	6
(Russia) A Olhovskiy	4	6	1
(Ukraine) D Poliakov	1	3
6	(Italy) R Furlan	6	6

Third round
4	(Spain) J Sánchez	7^{7}	6^{3}	6
13	(Spain) J Arrese	6^{5}	7^{7}	1
12	(Spain) T Carbonell	2	7^{7}	6
6	(Italy) R Furlan	6	6^{5}	4

Quarterfinals
4	(Spain) J Sánchez	6	2	3
12	(Spain) T Carbonell	3	6	6

=== Bottom half ===
==== Section 3 ====
First round
(Slovakia) M Vajda	5	7	4
(Spain) F Sánchez	7	5	6
WC	(Hungary) S Noszály	6	3	6
(Austria) W Schranz	4	6	1
(Spain) J Burillo	6	6
(Argentina) F Davín	2	1
(France) F Santoro	6	6
(France) G Solvès	2	2

Second round
5	(Austria) G Schaller	2	6	6
(Spain) F Sánchez	6	4	1
WC	(Hungary) S Noszály	6	6
11	(Austria) H Skoff	3	3
14	(Uruguay) M Filippini	3	2
(Spain) J Burillo	6	6
(France) F Santoro	2	6	6
3	(Italy) A Gaudenzi	6	4	3

Third round
5	(Austria) G Schaller	6	6
WC	(Hungary) S Noszály	3	3
(Spain) J Burillo	3	4
(France) F Santoro	6	6

Quarterfinals
5	(Austria) G Schaller	6	3	2
(France) F Santoro	4	6	6

==== Section 4 ====
First round
(Brazil) R Jabali	6	3	7^{7}
(South Africa) D Adams	2	6	6^{5}
(Germany) O Gross	6	7^{9}
(Belgium) F Dewulf	2	6^{7}
Q	(Spain) JA Viloca	4	6	6
(Argentina) P Arnold	6	2	4
WC	(Austria) J Knowle	3	2
(United States) L Gloria	6	6

Second round
7	(Haiti) R Agénor	6	6
(Brazil) R Jabali	4	0
(Germany) O Gross	6	6
10	(Russia) A Cherkasov	2	1
15	(Morocco) Y El Aynaoui	7	6^{4}	6^{7}
Q	(Spain) JA Viloca	5	7^{7}	7^{9}
(United States) L Gloria	3	7^{7}	1
2	(Austria) T Muster	6	6^{2}	6

Third round
7	(Haiti) R Agénor	4	3
(Germany) O Gross	6	6
Q	(Spain) JA Viloca	3	3
2	(Austria) T Muster	6	6

Quarterfinals
(Germany) O Gross	2	3
2	(Austria) T Muster	6	6
