= 1994 Lipton Championships – Men's singles =

Men's singles
- 1994 Lipton Championships

Final
- Champion: (United States) Pete Sampras
- Runner-up: (United States) Andre Agassi
- Score: 5–7, 6–3, 6–3

Details
- Draw: 98
- Seeds: 32

Events
Singles	men	women
Doubles	men	women
← 1993 ·	Lipton Championships	· 1995 →

Defending champion Pete Sampras defeated Andre Agassi in the final, 5–7, 6–3, 6–3 to win the men's singles tennis title at the 1994 Miami Open. With the win, he completed the Sunshine Double. The start of the final had been delayed for 50 minutes while Sampras received treatment for a stomach virus, and Agassi had the right to claim a walkover victory. Agassi instead chose to give Sampras the necessary time to receive the treatment that he needed so that he could play in the final.

== Seeds ==
All thirty-two seeds received a bye into the second round.

1. (United States) Pete Sampras (champion)
2. (Sweden) Stefan Edberg (quarterfinals)
3. (Spain) Sergi Bruguera (third round)
4. (United States) Jim Courier (semifinals)
5. (Croatia) Goran Ivanišević (quarterfinals)
6. (United States) Michael Chang (fourth round)
7. (United States) Todd Martin (second round)
8. (France) Cédric Pioline (fourth round)
9. (Czech Republic) Petr Korda (quarterfinals)
10. (Germany) Boris Becker (third round)
11. (Switzerland) Marc Rosset (third round)
12. (France) Arnaud Boetsch (second round)
13. (United States) Ivan Lendl (second round)
14. (South Africa) Wayne Ferreira (third round)
15. (Russia) Alexander Volkov (second round)
16. (United States) MaliVai Washington (second round)
17. (Netherlands) Paul Haarhuis (fourth round)
18. (Spain) Carlos Costa (second round)
19. (Russia) Andrei Chesnokov (third round)
20. (United States) Aaron Krickstein (fourth round)
21. (Germany) Marc-Kevin Goellner (second round)
22. (Peru) Jaime Yzaga (fourth round)
23. (United States) Brad Gilbert (third round)
24. (United States) Andre Agassi (final)
25. (Spain) Javier Sánchez (third round)
26. (United States) Jonathan Stark (third round)
27. (United States) Richey Reneberg (third round)
28. (Spain) Alberto Berasategui (third round)
29. (United States) Patrick McEnroe (second round)
30. (Russia) Andrei Cherkasov (third round)
31. (Australia) Jason Stoltenberg (third round)
32. (Germany) Karsten Braasch (second round)

== Draw ==
=== Key ===
- Q = Qualifier
- WC = Wild card
- LL = Lucky loser
- Alt = Alternate
- SE = Special exempt
- PR = Protected ranking
- ITF = ITF entry
- JE = Junior exempt
- w/o = Walkover
- r = Retired
- d = Defaulted
- SR = Special ranking

=== Finals ===
Quarterfinals
1	(United States) Pete Sampras	6	3	6
9	(Czech Republic) Petr Korda	2	6	1
4	(United States) Jim Courier	6	7
5	(Croatia) Goran Ivanišević	3	5
(Australia) Patrick Rafter	1	6	6
(United States) Jim Grabb	6	4	1
24	(United States) Andre Agassi	7^{9}	6
2/WC	(Sweden) Stefan Edberg	6^{7}	2

Semifinals
1	(United States) Pete Sampras	6	7^{12}
4	(United States) Jim Courier	4	6^{10}
(Australia) Patrick Rafter	2	4
24	(United States) Andre Agassi	6	6

Final
1	(United States) Pete Sampras	5	6	6
24	(United States) Andre Agassi	7	3	3

=== Top half ===
==== Section 1 ====
First round
(Mexico) L Herrera	2	3
(Italy) D Nargiso	6	6
WC	(Zimbabwe) K Ullyett	6^{5}	6	2
(United States) D Wheaton	7^{7}	4	6
(Brazil) L Mattar	1	4
(Australia) M Woodforde	6	6
(United States) J Palmer	6	6
Q	(United States) D Johnson	2	3

Second round
1	(United States) P Sampras	6	6
(Italy) D Nargiso	2	2
(United States) D Wheaton	6	3	6
32	(Germany) K Braasch	3	6	3
18	(Spain) C Costa	5	1
(Australia) M Woodforde	7	6
(United States) J Palmer	6	7^{8}
16	(United States) M Washington	3	6^{6}

Third round
1	(United States) P Sampras	6	5	6
(United States) D Wheaton	0	7	1
(Australia) M Woodforde	6^{3}	6	6
(United States) J Palmer	7^{7}	4	3

Fourth round
1	(United States) P Sampras	6	6
(Australia) M Woodforde	2	2

==== Section 2 ====
First round
Q	(The Bahamas) M Knowles	7	7
Q	(United States) J Canter	5	5
(Germany) B Karbacher	3	3
(France) R Gilbert	6	6
(Spain) E Sánchez	6	6
Q	(The Bahamas) R Smith	1	4
Q	(Argentina) P Arnold	6	5	6^{8}
(Zimbabwe) B Black	4	7	7^{10}

Second round
9	(Czech Republic) P Korda	4	6	6
Q	(The Bahamas) M Knowles	6	2	0
(France) R Gilbert	3	5
23	(United States) B Gilbert	6	7
25	(Spain) J Sánchez	3	6	6
(Spain) E Sánchez	6	2	4
(Zimbabwe) B Black	4	6	7^{7}
7	(United States) T Martin	6	2	6^{5}

Third round
9	(Czech Republic) P Korda	7^{7}	6
23	(United States) B Gilbert	6^{4}	3
25	(Spain) J Sánchez	6^{3}	6^{5}
(Zimbabwe) B Black	7^{7}	7^{7}

Fourth round
9	(Czech Republic) P Korda	6	6
(Zimbabwe) B Black	1	4

==== Section 3 ====
First round
(United States) J Tarango	6	1
(United Kingdom) C Wilkinson	0	0^{r}
Q	(Argentina) G Etlis	3	4
(Netherlands) J Eltingh	6	6
WC	(Argentina) A Mancini	7^{7}	3	6
WC	(Venezuela) N Pereira	6^{5}	6	3
(Netherlands) J Siemerink	6	6^{5}	6
(Canada) G Rusedski	4	7^{7}	3

Second round
4	(United States) J Courier	2	6	6
(United States) J Tarango	6	4	4
(Netherlands) J Eltingh	6^{4}	1
30	(Russia) A Cherkasov	7^{7}	6
19	(Russia) A Chesnokov	w/o
WC	(Argentina) A Mancini
(Netherlands) J Siemerink	3	7	7^{7}
13	(United States) I Lendl	6	5	6^{5}

Third round
4	(United States) J Courier	6	7
30	(Russia) A Cherkasov	3	5
19	(Russia) A Chesnokov	2	3
(Netherlands) J Siemerink	6	6

Fourth round
4	(United States) J Courier	6	6
(Netherlands) J Siemerink	4	1

==== Section 4 ====
First round
(Sweden) J Björkman	6	3	6
(Spain) JF Altur	3	6	0
(Australia) J Morgan	6	6
(South Africa) M Ondruska	2	3
Q	(Sweden) L-A Wahlgren	7	6
(Czech Republic) D Vacek	5	3
(Venezuela) M Ruah	3	4
(Japan) S Matsuoka	6	6

Second round
12	(France) A Boetsch	6^{5}	2
(Sweden) J Björkman	7^{7}	6
(Australia) J Morgan	4	7	4
22	(Peru) J Yzaga	6	5	6
27	(United States) R Reneberg	6	6
Q	(Sweden) L-A Wahlgren	1	3
(Empire of Japan) S Matsuoka	6	3	3
5	(Croatia) G Ivanišević	4	6	6

Third round
(Sweden) J Björkman	4	3
22	(Peru) J Yzaga	6	6
27	(United States) R Reneberg	4	4
5	(Croatia) G Ivanišević	6	6

Fourth round
22	(Peru) J Yzaga	4	4
5	(Croatia) G Ivanišević	6	6

=== Bottom half ===
==== Section 5 ====
First round
Q	(United States) L Gloria	6	6
(Italy) S Pescosolido	4	4
(New Zealand) B Steven	4	2
(Spain) J Burillo	6	6
(Australia) N Borwick	3	7^{7}	3
(Australia) P Rafter	6	6^{2}	6
Q	(Austria) R Burtscher	6	6
(Canada) S Lareau	2	3

Second round
6	(United States) M Chang	6	6
Q	(United States) L Gloria	1	3
(Spain) J Burillo	7^{7}	6^{4}	2
28	(Spain) A Berasategui	6^{3}	7^{7}	6
21	(Germany) M-K Goellner	3	6	5
(Australia) P Rafter	6	3	7
Q	(Austria) R Burtscher	4	3
11	(Switzerland) M Rosset	6	6

Third round
6	(United States) M Chang	1	6	6
28	(Spain) A Berasategui	6	4	2
(Australia) P Rafter	6	6
11	(Switzerland) M Rosset	2	3

Fourth round
6	(United States) M Chang	2	7^{7}	2
(Australia) P Rafter	6	6^{2}	6

==== Section 6 ====
First round
(Australia) T Woodbridge	1	3
(Brazil) F Meligeni	6	6
(United States) S Bryan	6	2	6
Q	(Ecuador) P Campana	3	6	4
(Brazil) J Oncins	6	3	1
(United States) J Grabb	4	6	6
(South Africa) G Stafford	6	6
(South Africa) C van Rensburg	2	0

Second round
14	(South Africa) W Ferreira	6	6
(Brazil) F Meligeni	3	2
(United States) S Bryan	6	6^{5}	4
20	(United States) A Krickstein	1	7^{7}	6
29	(United States) P McEnroe	6^{9}	3
(United States) J Grabb	7^{11}	6
(South Africa) G Stafford	6	1	0
3	(Spain) S Bruguera	4	6	6

Third round
14	(South Africa) W Ferreira	6	6^{1}	3
20	(United States) A Krickstein	4	7^{7}	6
(United States) J Grabb	7^{7}	6
3	(Spain) S Bruguera	6^{4}	3

Fourth round
20	(United States) A Krickstein	7	4	5
(United States) J Grabb	5	6	7

==== Section 7 ====
First round
(Colombia) M Hadad	3	7	4
Q	(United States) V Spadea	6	5	6
(France) O Delaître	7	6^{4}	6
(United States) D Flach	5	7^{7}	4
(United Kingdom) M Petchey	6	7
(United States) C Adams	3	5
(Sweden) N Kulti	6	7
(France) J-P Fleurian	4	5

Second round
8	(France) C Pioline	6	6
Q	(United States) V Spadea	3	3
(France) O Delaître	6^{5}	2
26	(United States) J Stark	7^{7}	6
24	(United States) A Agassi	6	4	6
(United Kingdom) M Petchey	2	6	4
(Sweden) N Kulti	6	4	0
10	(Germany) B Becker	3	6	6

Third round
8	(France) C Pioline	6	7
26	(United States) J Stark	4	5
24	(United States) A Agassi	6	7
10	(Germany) B Becker	2	5

Fourth round
8	(France) C Pioline	4	2
24	(United States) A Agassi	6	6

==== Section 8 ====
First round
(Czech Republic) D Rikl	6	3	4
WC	(Sweden) J Apell	3	6	6
(United States) A O'Brien	6	7^{7}
WC	(Sweden) M Wilander	3	6^{3}
(United States) B Shelton	6	6^{5}	6
Q	(Netherlands) T Nijssen	3	7^{7}	3
(Belgium) X Daufresne	1	4
(United States) R Weiss	6	6

Second round
15	(Russia) A Volkov	2	6	4
WC	(Sweden) J Apell	6	1	6
(United States) A O'Brien	0	2
17	(Netherlands) P Haarhuis	6	6
31	(Australia) J Stoltenberg	6	7
(United States) B Shelton	4	5
(United States) R Weiss	4	3
2/WC	(Sweden) S Edberg	6	6

Third round
WC	(Sweden) J Apell	4	3
17	(Netherlands) P Haarhuis	6	6
31	(Australia) J Stoltenberg	6^{3}	1
2/WC	(Sweden) S Edberg	7^{7}	6

Fourth round
17	(Netherlands) P Haarhuis	6^{2}	1
2/WC	(Sweden) S Edberg	7^{7}	6

== See also ==
- Agassi–Sampras rivalry
