= 1999 Generali Open =

- Date: 26 July – 1 August
- Edition: 44th
- Category: Championship Series
- Draw: 48S / 24D
- Prize money: $525,000
- Surface: Clay / outdoor
- Location: Kitzbühel, Austria

Champions

Singles
- (Spain) Albert Costa

Doubles
- (South Africa) Chris Haggard / (Sweden) Peter Nyborg
← 1998 ·	Generali Open	· 2000 →

The 1999 Generali Open was a men's tennis tournament played on outdoor clay courts in Kitzbühel, Austria that was part of the Championship Series of the 1999 ATP Tour. It was the 44th edition of the tournament and was held from 26 July until 1 August 1999. Fifth-seeded Albert Costa won his second consecutive singles title at the event and his third in total.

== Finals ==
=== Singles ===
(Spain) Albert Costa defeated (Spain) Fernando Vicente, 7–5, 6–2, 6–7^{(5–7)}, 7–6^{(7–4)}

- It was Costa's 3rd singles title of the year and the 11th of his career.

=== Doubles ===
(South Africa) Chris Haggard / (Sweden) Peter Nyborg defeated (Spain) Álex Calatrava / (Federal Republic of Yugoslavia) Dušan Vemić, 6–3, 6–7^{(4–7)}, 7–6^{(7–4)}
