= 1994 RCA Championships =

- Date: August 15–21
- Edition: 7th
- Category: Championship Series
- Draw: 56S / 28D
- Prize money: $915,000
- Surface: Hard / outdoors
- Location: Indianapolis, Indiana, U.S.
- Venue: Indianapolis Tennis Center

Champions

Singles
- (South Africa) Wayne Ferreira

Doubles
- (Australia) Todd Woodbridge / (Australia) Mark Woodforde
- Indianapolis Tennis Championships

The 1994 RCA Championships was a tennis tournament played on outdoor hard courts. It was the 7th edition of the event known that year as the RCA Championships, and was part of the Championship Series of the 1994 ATP Tour. It took place at the Indianapolis Tennis Center in Indianapolis, Indiana, United States, from August 15 through August 21, 1995.

The singles draw featured ATP No. 2, Wimbledon runner-up and Kitzbühel titlist Goran Ivanišević, French Open champion, Gstaad and Prague winner Sergi Bruguera, and Australian Open semifinalist, Doha, Stuttgart Indoor and Washington titlist Stefan Edberg. Among other seeds were Australian Open runner-up and Queen's Club champion Todd Martin, Indianapolis defending champion Jim Courier, Thomas Muster, Wayne Ferreira and Cédric Pioline.

== Finals ==
=== Singles ===
(South Africa) Wayne Ferreira defeated (France) Olivier Delaître, 6–2, 6–1

- It was Ferreira's 2nd singles title of the year, and his 4th overall.

=== Doubles ===
(Australia) Todd Woodbridge / (Australia) Mark Woodforde defeated (United States) Jim Grabb / (United States) Richey Reneberg, 6–3, 6–4
