= 1993 RCA Championships – Singles =

Singles
- 1993 RCA Championships

Final
- Champion: (United States) Jim Courier
- Runner-up: (Germany) Boris Becker
- Score: 7–5, 6–3

Details
- Draw: 56 (5WC / 7Q)
- Seeds: 16

Events
Singles	Doubles
- Indianapolis Tennis Championships

The 1993 RCA Championships – Singles was an event of the 1993 RCA Championships men's tennis tournament which was held from August 16 through August 22, 1993, at the Indianapolis Tennis Center in Indianapolis, Indiana, in the United States. The tournament was part of Championship Series of the 1993 ATP Tour. The singles draw consisted of 56 players and 16 of them were seeded.

First-seeded Pete Sampras was the defending champion but lost in the quarterfinals to Pat Rafter. First-seeded Jim Courier won the singles title after a 7–5, 6–3 victory in the final against third-seeded Boris Becker.

== Seeds ==
1. (United States) Pete Sampras (quarterfinals)
2. (United States) Jim Courier (champion)
3. (Germany) Boris Becker (final)
4. (Croatia) Goran Ivanišević (third round)
5. (United States) Todd Martin (second round)
6. (Russia) Alexander Volkov (third round)
7. (France) Cédric Pioline (quarterfinals)
8. (South Africa) Wayne Ferreira (third round)
9. (Australia) Wally Masur (second round)
10. (Russia) Andrei Chesnokov (second round)
11. (United States) Richey Reneberg (quarterfinals)
12. (United States) David Wheaton (second round)
13. (United States) Brad Gilbert (second round)
14. (Sweden) Mikael Pernfors (first round)
15. (New Zealand) Brett Steven (second round)
16. (France) Fabrice Santoro (second round)

Click on the seed number of a player to go to their draw section.

== Draw ==
Key

- Q = Qualifier
- WC = Wild card
- LL = Lucky loser
- Alt = Alternate
- ITF = ITF entry
- PR = Protected ranking
- SR = Special ranking
- SE = Special exempt
- JE = Junior exempt
- JR = Junior Accelerator Programme entrant
- CO = College Accelerator Programme entrant
- NG = Next Gen Accelerator Program entrant
- w/o = Walkover
- r = Retired
- d = Defaulted

=== Finals ===
Quarterfinals
1	(United States) Pete Sampras	6^{6}	7^{7}	6^{5}
(Australia) Pat Rafter	7^{8}	6^{3}	7^{7}
3	(Germany) Boris Becker	6	6
11	(United States) Richey Reneberg	4	3
(Brazil) Luiz Mattar	6	6
Q	(United States) Jimmy Arias	2	2
7	(France) Cédric Pioline	3	4
2	(United States) Jim Courier	6	6

Semifinals
(Australia) Pat Rafter	4	6	4
3	(Germany) Boris Becker	6	3	6
(Brazil) Luiz Mattar	3	2
2	(United States) Jim Courier	6	6

Final
3	(Germany) Boris Becker	5	3
2	(United States) Jim Courier	7	6

=== Top half ===
==== Section 1 ====
First Round
1	(United States) Pete Sampras
BYE
Q	(United States) Todd Nelson	6	6
WC	(United States) Brian MacPhie	4	1
Q	(United States) Bret Garnett	1	2
(United States) Jonathan Stark	6	6
(Denmark) Kenneth Carlsen	2	4
16	(France) Fabrice Santoro	6	6
10	(Russia) Andrei Chesnokov	6	6
(Sweden) Thomas Enqvist	2	4
(Australia) Pat Rafter	4	6	6
WC	(United Kingdom) Greg Rusedski	6	0	1
Q	(Italy) Cristiano Caratti	6	3	6
(France) Rodolphe Gilbert	3	6	1
BYE
8	(South Africa) Wayne Ferreira

Second Round
1	(United States) Pete Sampras	6	6
Q	(United States) Todd Nelson	3	4
(United States) Jonathan Stark	6	7
16	(France) Fabrice Santoro	3	5
10	(Russia) Andrei Chesnokov	1	2
(Australia) Pat Rafter	6	6
Q	(Italy) Cristiano Caratti	0	1
8	(South Africa) Wayne Ferreira	6	6

Third Round
1	(United States) Pete Sampras	5	7^{7}	6
(United States) Jonathan Stark	7	6^{2}	3
(Australia) Pat Rafter	3	6	7
8	(South Africa) Wayne Ferreira	6	4	5

Quarterfinals
1	(United States) Pete Sampras	6^{6}	7^{7}	6^{5}
(Australia) Pat Rafter	7^{8}	6^{3}	7^{7}

==== Section 2 ====
First Round
3	(Germany) Boris Becker
BYE
(France) Guillaume Raoux	4	2
Q	(Canada) Andrew Sznajder	6	6
(United States) Jeff Tarango	6^{5}	6	6
(Sweden) Nicklas Kulti	7^{7}	4	4
(Russia) Andrei Cherkasov	6	7^{7}
14	(Sweden) Mikael Pernfors	4	6^{5}
11	(United States) Richey Reneberg	6	6
(Netherlands) Jacco Eltingh	4	2
(United States) Derrick Rostagno	6	6
(Italy) Gianluca Pozzi	1	4
WC	(United States) David Witt	3	0
(Peru) Jaime Yzaga	6	6
BYE
5	(United States) Todd Martin

Second Round
3	(Germany) Boris Becker	6	5	6
Q	(Canada) Andrew Sznajder	4	7	4
(United States) Jeff Tarango	4	0
(Russia) Andrei Cherkasov	6	6
11	(United States) Richey Reneberg	6	6
(United States) Derrick Rostagno	1	4
(Peru) Jaime Yzaga	4	7^{7}	6
5	(United States) Todd Martin	6	6^{5}	0

Third Round
3	(Germany) Boris Becker	6	7
(Russia) Andrei Cherkasov	4	5
11	(United States) Richey Reneberg	6^{5}	7^{8}	6
(Peru) Jaime Yzaga	7^{7}	6^{6}	3

Quarterfinals
3	(Germany) Boris Becker	6	6
11	(United States) Richey Reneberg	4	3

=== Bottom half ===
==== Section 3 ====
First Round
6	(Russia) Alexander Volkov
BYE
(Germany) Markus Zoecke	6	6
(Australia) Jason Stoltenberg	3	2
(France) Stéphane Simian	4	6^{3}
(Brazil) Luiz Mattar	6	7^{7}
(Spain) Francisco Clavet	4	2
12	(United States) David Wheaton	6	6
13	(United States) Brad Gilbert	1	6	7^{8}
(United States) Aaron Krickstein	6	3	6^{6}
Q	(United States) Jimmy Arias	6	6
Q	(United States) Ivan Baron	2	2
(United States) Bryan Shelton	4	6	6
Q	(Mexico) Agustín Moreno	6	3	1
BYE
4	(Croatia) Goran Ivanišević

Second Round
6	(Russia) Alexander Volkov	6	6
(Germany) Markus Zoecke	4	4
(Brazil) Luiz Mattar	7^{9}	2	6
12	(United States) David Wheaton	6^{7}	6	2
13	(United States) Brad Gilbert	6	4	4
Q	(United States) Jimmy Arias	2	6	6
(United States) Bryan Shelton	3	3
4	(Croatia) Goran Ivanišević	6	6

Third Round
6	(Russia) Alexander Volkov	6	4	1
(Brazil) Luiz Mattar	3	6	6
Q	(United States) Jimmy Arias	3	6	6
4	(Croatia) Goran Ivanišević	6	4	4

Quarterfinals
(Brazil) Luiz Mattar	6	6
Q	(United States) Jimmy Arias	2	2

==== Section 4 ====
First Round
7	(France) Cédric Pioline
BYE
(Netherlands) Paul Haarhuis	7^{7}	6
(Spain) Àlex Corretja	6^{5}	3
(Australia) Jamie Morgan	6	4	6
(Switzerland) Jakob Hlasek	3	6	4
(United States) Patrick McEnroe	3	2
9	(Australia) Wally Masur	6	6
15	(New Zealand) Brett Steven	6	7^{7}
WC	(United States) Todd Witsken	3	6^{5}
(Spain) Tomás Carbonell	7^{7}	6
WC	(United States) David DiLucia	6^{5}	0
(United States) Jared Palmer	1	4
(Brazil) Jaime Oncins	6	6
BYE
2	(United States) Jim Courier

Second Round
7	(France) Cédric Pioline	7^{7}	6
(Netherlands) Paul Haarhuis	6^{0}	4
(Australia) Jamie Morgan	6	6
9	(Australia) Wally Masur	1	4
15	(New Zealand) Brett Steven	2	6	6^{4}
(Spain) Tomás Carbonell	6	4	7^{7}
(Brazil) Jaime Oncins	3	2
2	(United States) Jim Courier	6	6

Third Round
7	(France) Cédric Pioline	6	7
(Australia) Jamie Morgan	4	5
(Spain) Tomás Carbonell	2	1
2	(United States) Jim Courier	6	6

Quarterfinals
7	(France) Cédric Pioline	3	4
2	(United States) Jim Courier	6	6
