= 1996 EA Generali Open – Doubles =

Doubles
- 1996 EA Generali Open
- 1995 Champions: (United States) Francisco Montana (United States) Greg Van Emburgh

Final
- Champions: (Belgium) Libor Pimek (South Africa) Byron Talbot
- Runners-up: (South Africa) David Adams (Netherlands) Menno Oosting
- Score: 7–6, 6–3

Details
- Draw: 24
- Seeds: 8

Events
Singles	Doubles
← 1995 ·	Austrian Open Kitzbühel	· 1997 →

Francisco Montana and Greg Van Emburgh were the defending champions but they competed with different partners that year, Montana with Donald Johnson and Van Emburgh with Shelby Cannon.

Johnson and Montana lost in the second round to Jeff Belloli and Vojtěch Flégl.

Cannon and Van Emburgh lost in the quarterfinals to Libor Pimek and Byron Talbot.

Pimek and Talbot won in the final 7–6, 6–3 against David Adams and Menno Oosting.

== Seeds ==
Champion seeds are indicated in bold text while text in italics indicates the round in which those seeds were eliminated. All eight seeded teams received byes to the second round.

1. (Belgium) **Libor Pimek** / (South Africa) **Byron Talbot (champions)**
2. (Czech Republic) David Rikl / (Spain) Javier Sánchez (second round)
3. (United States) Trevor Kronemann / (Australia) David Macpherson (second round)
4. (South Africa) David Adams / (Netherlands) Menno Oosting (final)
5. (South Africa) John-Laffnie de Jager / (Netherlands) Sjeng Schalken (semifinals)
6. (United States) Donald Johnson / (United States) Francisco Montana (second round)
7. (Australia) Joshua Eagle / (Australia) Andrew Florent (second round)
8. (United States) Shelby Cannon / (United States) Greg Van Emburgh (quarterfinals)

== Draw ==
=== Key ===
- Q = Qualifier
- WC = Wild card
- LL = Lucky loser
- Alt = Alternate
- SE = Special exempt
- PR = Protected ranking
- ITF = ITF entry
- JE = Junior exempt
- w/o = Walkover
- r = Retired
- d = Defaulted
- SR = Special ranking

=== Final ===
Final

1
- (Belgium) **Libor Pimek**
- (South Africa) **Byron Talbot**
**7**
**6**

4
- (South Africa) David Adams
- (Netherlands) Menno Oosting
6
3

=== Top half ===
First round

Second round

Quarterfinals

Semifinals

1
- (Belgium) **L Pimek**
- (South Africa) **B Talbot**
**6**
**7**

- (Australia) **J Ireland**
- (North Macedonia) **A Kitinov**
**6**
**7**

- (Australia) J Ireland
- (North Macedonia) A Kitinov
4
5

- (France) O Delaître
- (France) F Santoro
1
6

1
- (Belgium) **L Pimek**
- (South Africa) **B Talbot**
**6**
**6**

WC
- (Czech Republic) C Doseděl
- (Chile) M Ríos
**7**
4
4

8
- (United States) S Cannon
- (United States) G Van Emburgh
3
2

- (Sweden) **R Bergh**
- (United States) **J Waite**
6
**6**
**6**

- (Sweden) R Bergh
- (United States) J Waite
4
**7**
3

8
- (United States) **S Cannon**
- (United States) **G Van Emburgh**
**6**
6
**6**

1
- (Belgium) **L Pimek**
- (South Africa) **B Talbot**
**6**
3
**6**

5
- (South Africa) J-L de Jager
- (Netherlands) S Schalken
3
**6**
3

3
- (United States) T Kronemann
- (Australia) D Macpherson
**7**
4
6

WC
- (Austria) T Muster
- (Austria) C Trimmel
**6**
6
6

WC
- (Austria) **G Blumauer**
- (Austria) **G Mandl**
6
**6**
**7**

WC
- (Austria) **G Blumauer**
- (Austria) **G Mandl**
2
**7**
**7**

WC
- (Austria) G Blumauer
- (Austria) G Mandl
4
3

- (Belgium) T Vanhoudt
- (Netherlands) F Wibier
4
2

5
- (South Africa) **J-L de Jager**
- (Netherlands) **S Schalken**
**6**
**6**

- (Portugal) **J Cunha e Silva**
- (Portugal) **N Marques**
**6**
**6**

- (Portugal) J Cunha e Silva
- (Portugal) N Marques
4
5

5
- (South Africa) **J-L de Jager**
- (Netherlands) **S Schalken**
**6**
**7**

=== Bottom half ===
First round

Second round

Quarterfinals

Semifinals

6
- (United States) D Johnson
- (United States) F Montana
4
6

- (Sweden) D Ekerot
- (Netherlands) S Noteboom
**7**
6
6

- (United States) **J Belloli**
- (Czech Republic) **V Flégl**
**6**
**7**

- (United States) **J Belloli**
- (Czech Republic) **V Flégl**
6
**7**
**7**

- (United States) J Belloli
- (Czech Republic) V Flégl
6
6

Q
- (Spain) **J Alonso**
- (Spain) **A Martín**
**6**
**6**

4
- (South Africa) **D Adams**
- (Netherlands) **M Oosting**
**7**
**7**

WC
- (Spain) J Burillo
- (Spain) E Sánchez
3
2

Q
- (Spain) J Alonso
- (Spain) A Martín
4
4

4
- (South Africa) **D Adams**
- (Netherlands) **M Oosting**
**6**
**6**

4
- (South Africa) **D Adams**
- (Netherlands) **M Oosting**
**6**
4
**6**

- (Argentina) P Albano
- (Argentina) L Arnold
3
**6**
4

7
- (Australia) J Eagle
- (Australia) A Florent
**7**
6
4

- (Italy) C Brandi
- (Italy) F Messori
**6**
3
2

- (United States) **B Hansen-Dent**
- (United States) **T. J. Middleton**
6
**7**
**6**

- (United States) **B Hansen-Dent**
- (United States) **T. J. Middleton**
2
**6**
**6**

- (United States) B Hansen-Dent
- (United States) T. J. Middleton
**6**
4
2

- (Spain) J A Conde
- (Spain) À Corretja
3
5

- (Argentina) **P Albano**
- (Argentina) **L Arnold**
2
**6**
**6**

- (Argentina) **P Albano**
- (Argentina) **L Arnold**
**6**
**7**

- (Argentina) **P Albano**
- (Argentina) **L Arnold**
**6**
3
**6**

2
- (Czech Republic) D Rikl
- (Spain) J Sánchez
3
**6**
4
