= 1996 EA Generali Open – Singles =

Singles
- 1996 EA Generali Open

Final
- Champion: (Spain) Alberto Berasategui
- Runner-up: (Spain) Àlex Corretja
- Score: 6–2, 6–4, 6–4

Details
- Draw: 48
- Seeds: 16

Events
Singles	Doubles
- Austrian Open Kitzbühel

Albert Costa was the defending champion but did not compete that year.

Fifth-seeded Alberto Berasategui won in the final 6–2, 6–4, 6–4 against Àlex Corretja.

== Seeds ==
A champion seed is indicated in bold text while text in italics indicates the round in which that seed was eliminated. All sixteen seeds received a bye to the second round.

1. (Austria) Thomas Muster (quarterfinals)
2. (Chile) Marcelo Ríos (third round)
3. (Spain) Félix Mantilla (third round)
4. (Spain) Carlos Moyá (second round)
5. (Spain) **Alberto Berasategui (champion)**
6. (Czech Republic) Bohdan Ulihrach (third round)
7. (Spain) Francisco Clavet (second round)
8. (Germany) Bernd Karbacher (second round)
9. (Ukraine) Andriy Medvedev (third round)
10. (Austria) Gilbert Schaller (second round)
11. (Spain) Àlex Corretja (final)
12. (Czech Republic) Ctislav Doseděl (third round)
13. (Belgium) Filip Dewulf (quarterfinals)
14. (Netherlands) Sjeng Schalken (third round)
15. (Spain) Jordi Burillo (second round)
16. (Spain) Javier Sánchez (second round)

== Draw ==
Key

- Q = Qualifier
- WC = Wild card
- LL = Lucky loser
- Alt = Alternate
- ITF = ITF entry
- PR = Protected ranking
- SR = Special ranking
- SE = Special exempt
- JE = Junior exempt
- JR = Junior Accelerator Programme entrant
- CO = College Accelerator Programme entrant
- NG = Next Gen Accelerator Program entrant
- w/o = Walkover
- r = Retired
- d = Defaulted

=== Finals ===
Semifinals
LL	(Spain) Emilio Benfele Álvarez	**6**	1	3
5	(Spain) **Alberto Berasategui**	4	**6**	**6**
11	(Spain) **Àlex Corretja**	**7^{7}**	**6**
Q	(Spain) Juan Albert Viloca	6^{4}	1

Final
5	(Spain) **Alberto Berasategui**	**6**	**6**	**6**
11	(Spain) Àlex Corretja	2	4	4

=== Top half ===
==== Section 1 ====
First round
(Spain) **E Sánchez**	**6**	**6**
Q	(Austria) T Schiessling	3	4
(United States) J Tarango	**6**	1	1
(Argentina) **M Zabaleta**	1	**6**	**6**
(Russia) **A Volkov**	**6**	**1**
(Italy) M Meneschincheri	3	0	r
LL	(Spain) **E Benfele Álvarez**	**6**	**6**
(France) F Santoro	3	4

Second round
1	(Austria) **T Muster**	**6**	**6**
(Spain) E Sánchez	3	3
(Argentina) **M Zabaleta**	3	**6**	**7^{8}**
15	(Spain) J Burillo	**6**	2	6^{6}
9	(Ukraine) **A Medvedev**	**6**	**7^{10}**
(Russia) A Volkov	4	6^{8}
LL	(Spain) **E Benfele Álvarez**	**6**	**6**
7	(Spain) F Clavet	3	3

Third round
1	(Austria) **T Muster**	**6**	**6**
(Argentina) M Zabaleta	1	2
9	(Ukraine) A Medvedev	**6**	6^{4}	1
LL	(Spain) **E Benfele Álvarez**	2	**7^{7}**	**6**

Quarterfinals
1	(Austria) T Muster	1	5
LL	(Spain) **E Benfele Álvarez**	**6**	**7**

==== Section 2 ====
First round
(Brazil) G Kuerten	1	2
Q	(Argentina) **F Squillari**	**6**	**6**
Q	(Poland) **W Kowalski**	**6**	**7^{7}**
(Portugal) J Cunha e Silva	3	6^{4}
(France) O Delaître	4	1
Q	(Italy) **D Balducci**	**6**	**6**
(Italy) **O Camporese**	**6**	**6**
(Morocco) Y El Aynaoui	4	4

Second round
(Spain) C Moyá	3	4
Q	(Argentina) **F Squillari**	**6**	**6**
Q	(Poland) W Kowalski	6^{5}	3
14	(Netherlands) **S Schalken**	**7^{7}**	**6**
12	(Czech Republic) **C Doseděl**	6^{4}	**6**	**6**
Q	(Italy) D Balducci	**7^{7}**	4	2
(Italy) O Camporese	1	4
5	(Spain) **A Berasategui**	**6**	**6**

Third round
Q	(Argentina) **F Squillari**	**6**	**7^{8}**
14	(Netherlands) S Schalken	3	6^{6}
12	(Czech Republic) C Doseděl	**6**	3	4
5	(Spain) **A Berasategui**	3	**6**	**6**

Quarterfinals
Q	(Argentina) F Squillari	3	**6**	2
5	(Spain) **A Berasategui**	**6**	1	**6**

=== Bottom half ===
==== Section 3 ====
First round
(Spain) A Portas	3	6^{1}
(Italy) **F Messori**	**6**	**7^{7}**
(Russia) A Cherkasov	**7**	5	3
(Spain) **G Blanco**	5	**7**	**6**
(Australia) R Fromberg	1	3
(Czech Republic) **D Rikl**	**6**	**6**
(Germany) **L Burgsmüller**	**6**	**6**
Q	(Argentina) M Charpentier	3	2

Second round
6	(Czech Republic) **B Ulihrach**	**7^{8}**	**6**
(Italy) F Messori	6^{6}	3
(Spain) G Blanco	**7^{7}**	3	4
11	(Spain) **À Corretja**	6^{3}	**6**	**6**
13	(Belgium) **F Dewulf**	5	**6**	**6**
(Czech Republic) D Rikl	**7**	2	4
(Germany) L Burgsmüller	4	5
3	(Spain) **F Mantilla**	**6**	**7**

Third round
6	(Czech Republic) B Ulihrach	3	2
11	(Spain) **À Corretja**	**6**	**6**
13	(Belgium) **F Dewulf**	**6**	**6**
3	(Spain) F Mantilla	3	2

Quarterfinals
11	(Spain) **À Corretja**	**6**	**6**
13	(Belgium) F Dewulf	4	1

==== Section 4 ====
First round
WC	(Germany) **N Kiefer**	**6**	**6**
(Italy) L Tieleman	2	3
(Portugal) **N Marques**	**6**	5	**7^{7}**
(Romania) A Voinea	2	**7**	6^{3}
Q	(Spain) **J A Viloca**	**6**	**6**
WC	(Austria) H Wiltschnig	3	3
WC	(Austria) **M Hipfl**	**6**	**6**
WC	(Austria) S Koubek	2	3

Second round
8	(Germany) B Karbacher	2	3
WC	(Germany) **N Kiefer**	**6**	**6**
(Portugal) **N Marques**	**7^{7}**	**6**
10	(Austria) G Schaller	6^{3}	3
16	(Spain) J Sánchez	6^{5}	2
Q	(Spain) **J A Viloca**	**7^{7}**	**6**
WC	(Austria) M Hipfl	5	**7^{7}**	1
WC/2	(Chile) **M Ríos**	**7**	6^{5}	**6**

Third round
WC	(Germany) **N Kiefer**	**6**	**6**
(Portugal) N Marques	3	0
Q	(Spain) **J A Viloca**	**6**	**7^{7}**
WC/2	(Chile) M Ríos	1	6^{4}

Quarterfinals
WC	(Germany) N Kiefer	5	4
Q	(Spain) **J A Viloca**	**7**	**6**
