= 1995 EA Generali Open =

- Date: 31 July – 7 August
- Edition: 25th
- Category: World Series
- Draw: 48S / 24D
- Prize money: $400,000
- Surface: Clay / outdoor
- Location: Kitzbühel, Austria
- Venue: Kitzbüheler Tennisclub

Champions

Singles
- (Spain) Albert Costa

Doubles
- (United States) Francisco Montana / (United States) Greg Van Emburgh
← 1994 ·	Austrian Open Kitzbühel	· 1996 →

The 1995 EA Generali Open, also known as Austrian Open, was a men's tennis tournament held at the Kitzbüheler Tennisclub in Kitzbühel, Austria and played on outdoor clay courts. The event was part of the World Series of the 1995 ATP Tour. It was the 25th edition of the tournament and was held from 31 July until 7 August 1995. Fifth-seeded Albert Costa won the singles title.

== Finals ==
=== Singles ===
(Spain) Albert Costa defeated (Austria) Thomas Muster, 4–6, 6–4, 7–6^{(7–3)}, 2–6, 6–4

- It was Costa's first singles title of his career.

=== Doubles ===
(United States) Francisco Montana / (United States) Greg Van Emburgh defeated (Spain) Jordi Arrese / (Australia) Wayne Arthurs 6–7, 6–3, 7–6
