= 1997 Generali Open =

- Date: 21–27 July
- Edition: 42nd
- Category: World Series
- Draw: 48S / 24D
- Prize money: $500,000
- Surface: Clay / outdoor
- Location: Kitzbühel, Austria

Champions

Singles
- (Belgium) Filip Dewulf

Doubles
- (Australia) Wayne Arthurs / (Australia) Richard Fromberg
| ← 1996 · | Austrian Open Kitzbühel | · 1998 → |

The 1997 Generali Open was a men's tennis tournament played on outdoor clay courts in Kitzbühel, Austria that was part of the World Series of the 1997 ATP Tour. It was the 42nd edition of the tournament and was held from 21 July until 27 July 1997. Tenth-seeded Filip Dewulf won the singles title.

== Finals ==
=== Singles ===
(Belgium) Filip Dewulf defeated (Spain) Julián Alonso, 7–6^{(7–2)}, 6–4, 6–1

- It was Dewulf's 1st singles title of the year and the 2nd of his career.

=== Doubles ===
(Australia) Wayne Arthurs / (Australia) Richard Fromberg defeated (Austria) Thomas Buchmayer / (Austria) Thomas Strengberger, 6–4, 6–3
