= 1998 Generali Open – Doubles =

Doubles
- 1998 Generali Open

Final
- Champions: (Netherlands) Tom Kempers (Argentina) Daniel Orsanic
- Runners-up: (Australia) Joshua Eagle (Australia) Andrew Kratzmann
- Score: 6–3, 6–4

Details
- Draw: 24
- Seeds: 8

Events
Singles	Doubles
- Generali Open

The 1998 Generali Open was a men's tennis tournament played on Clay in Kitzbühel, Austria that was part of the International Series of the 1998 ATP Tour. It was the forty-third edition of the tournament and was held from 27 July – 2 August 1998.

== Seeds ==
Champion seeds are indicated in bold text while text in italics indicates the round in which those seeds were eliminated.

1. (Australia) Joshua Eagle / (Australia) Andrew Kratzmann (final)
2. (Netherlands) **Tom Kempers** / (Argentina) **Daniel Orsanic (champions)**
3. (Argentina) Pablo Albano / (Ecuador) Nicolás Lapentti (semifinals)
4. (South Africa) David Adams / (Netherlands) Fernon Wibier (second round)
5. (North Macedonia) Aleksandar Kitinov / (Czech Republic) Pavel Vízner (quarterfinals)
6. (Australia) Wayne Arthurs / (United States) Jack Waite (second round)
7. (Argentina) Lucas Arnold Ker / (Argentina) Mariano Hood (quarterfinals)
8. (Belgium) Libor Pimek / (Czech Republic) Tomáš Anzari (quarterfinals)

== Draw ==
Key

- Q = Qualifier
- WC = Wild card
- LL = Lucky loser
- Alt = Alternate
- ITF = ITF entry
- PR = Protected ranking
- SR = Special ranking
- SE = Special exempt
- JE = Junior exempt
- JR = Junior Accelerator Programme entrant
- CO = College Accelerator Programme entrant
- NG = Next Gen Accelerator Program entrant
- w/o = Walkover
- r = Retired
- d = Defaulted

=== Finals ===
Semifinals
1	(Australia) **Joshua Eagle** **(Australia) Andrew Kratzmann**	**6**	**6**
(South Africa) Marius Barnard (Italy) Filippo Messori	3	4
3	(Argentina) Pablo Albano (Ecuador) Nicolás Lapentti	6	**7**	4
2	(Netherlands) **Tom Kempers** **(Argentina) Daniel Orsanic**	**7**	5	**6**

Final
1	(Australia) Joshua Eagle (Australia) Andrew Kratzmann	3	4
2	(Netherlands) **Tom Kempers** **(Argentina) Daniel Orsanic**	**6**	**6**

=== Top half ===
First round
(Italy) **G Castrichella** **(Germany) L Rehmann**	**7**	**7**
(New Zealand) J Greenhalgh (Socialist Federal Republic of Yugoslavia) N Zimonjić	6	6
(Spain) **J Balcells** **(Spain) A Berasategui**	**6**	3	**7**
(Germany) K Braasch (Australia) R Fromberg	2	**6**	6
(South Africa) **M Barnard** **(Italy) F Messori**	**7**	6	**6**
(Australia) J Holmes (Australia) P Tramacchi	5	**7**	3
(Spain) **J Alonso** **(Czech Republic) C Doseděl**	**7**	**6**
(Italy) M Bertolini (United States) D Bowen	5	2

Second round
1	(Australia) **J Eagle** **(Australia) A Kratzmann**	4	**6**	**6**
(Italy) G Castrichella (Germany) L Rehmann	**6**	2	1
(Spain) J Balcells (Spain) A Berasategui	4	4
7	(Argentina) **L Arnold** **(Argentina) M Hood**	**6**	**6**
4	(South Africa) D Adams (Netherlands) F Wibier	**6**	5	6
(South Africa) **M Barnard** **(Italy) F Messori**	1	**7**	**7**
(Spain) J Alonso (Czech Republic) C Doseděl	4	6
5	(North Macedonia) **A Kitinov** **(Czech Republic) P Vízner**	**6**	**7**

Quarterfinals
1	(Australia) **J Eagle** **(Australia) A Kratzmann**	3	**6**	**6**
7	(Argentina) L Arnold (Argentina) M Hood	**6**	4	4
(South Africa) **M Barnard** **(Italy) F Messori**	**6**	**6**
5	(North Macedonia) A Kitinov (Czech Republic) P Vízner	4	3

Semifinals
1	(Australia) **J Eagle** **(Australia) A Kratzmann**	**6**	**6**
(South Africa) M Barnard (Italy) F Messori	3	4

=== Bottom half ===
First round
(Brazil) **F Meligeni** **(Brazil) J Oncins**	**6**	**6**
(Portugal) J Cunha e Silva (Netherlands) M Hilpert	3	4
(Netherlands) **S Noteboom** **(Russia) A Olhovskiy**	**6**	**7**
(Austria) G Blumauer (Austria) T Buchmayer	4	6
(Russia) A Cherkasov (Austria) U Plamberger	3	4
(Austria) **W Schranz** **(Austria) T Strengberger**	**6**	**6**
(Belgium) **F Dewulf** **(Belgium) T Vanhoudt**	**6**	**6**
(Italy) A Gaudenzi (Austria) T Muster	3	4

Second round
6	(Australia) W Arthurs (United States) J Waite	2	4
(Brazil) **F Meligeni** **(Brazil) J Oncins**	**6**	**6**
(Netherlands) S Noteboom (Russia) A Olhovskiy	0	4
3	(Argentina) **P Albano** **(Ecuador) N Lapentti**	**6**	**6**
8	(Belgium) **L Pimek** **(Czech Republic) T Anzari**	4	**6**	**6**
(Austria) W Schranz (Austria) T Strengberger	**6**	4	4
(Belgium) F Dewulf (Belgium) T Vanhoudt	6	5
2	(Netherlands) **T Kempers** **(Argentina) D Orsanic**	**7**	**7**

Quarterfinals
(Brazil) F Meligeni (Brazil) J Oncins	**7**	2	3
3	(Argentina) **P Albano** **(Ecuador) N Lapentti**	6	**6**	**6**
8	(Belgium) L Pimek (Czech Republic) T Anzari	**7**	2	4
2	(Netherlands) **T Kempers** **(Argentina) D Orsanic**	5	**6**	**6**

Semifinals
3	(Argentina) P Albano (Ecuador) N Lapentti	6	**7**	4
2	(Netherlands) **T Kempers** **(Argentina) D Orsanic**	**7**	5	**6**
