= 1996 EA Generali Open =

- Date: 22–28 July
- Edition: 41st
- Category: World Series
- Draw: 48S / 24D
- Prize money: $400,000
- Surface: Clay / outdoor
- Location: Kitzbühel, Austria

Champions

Singles
- (Spain) Alberto Berasategui

Doubles
- (Belgium) Libor Pimek / (South Africa) Byron Talbot
← 1995 ·	Austrian Open Kitzbühel	· 1997 →

The 1996 EA Generali Open was a men's tennis tournament played on outdoor clay courts in Kitzbühel, Austria that was part of the World Series of the 1996 ATP Tour. It was the 41st edition of the tournament and was held from 22 July until 28 July 1996. Fifth-seeded Alberto Berasategui won the singles title.

== Finals ==
=== Singles ===
(Spain) Alberto Berasategui defeated (Spain) Àlex Corretja, 6–2, 6–4, 6–4

- It was Berasategui's 2nd singles title of the year and the 11th of his career.

=== Doubles ===
(Belgium) Libor Pimek / (South Africa) Byron Talbot defeated (South Africa) David Adams / (Netherlands) Menno Oosting, 7–6, 6–3
