= 1994 RCA Championships – Singles =

Singles
- 1994 RCA Championships

Final
- Champion: (South Africa) Wayne Ferreira
- Runner-up: (France) Olivier Delaître
- Score: 6–2, 6–1

Details
- Draw: 56 (5WC/4Q/1LL)
- Seeds: 16

Events
Singles	Doubles
- Indianapolis Tennis Championships

Jim Courier was the defending champion, but lost in the second round to Àlex Corretja.

Wayne Ferreira won the title by defeating Olivier Delaître 6–2, 6–1 in the final.

== Seeds ==
The top eight seeds received a bye into the second round.

1. (Croatia) Goran Ivanišević (second round)
2. (Spain) Sergi Bruguera (third round)
3. (Sweden) Stefan Edberg (quarterfinals)
4. (United States) Todd Martin (second round)
5. (United States) Jim Courier (second round)
6. (Austria) Thomas Muster (second round)
7. (South Africa) Wayne Ferreira (champion)
8. (France) Cédric Pioline (second round)
9. (Spain) Carlos Costa (third round)
10. (Australia) Jason Stoltenberg (second round, retired)
11. (Peru) Jaime Yzaga (first round)
12. (Italy) Andrea Gaudenzi (third round)
13. (Russia) Alexander Volkov (second round)
14. (Netherlands) Richard Krajicek (third round)
15. (Spain) Javier Sánchez (first round)
16. (Sweden) Thomas Enqvist (quarterfinals)

== Draw ==
Key

- Q = Qualifier
- WC = Wild card
- LL = Lucky loser
- Alt = Alternate
- ITF = ITF entry
- PR = Protected ranking
- SR = Special ranking
- SE = Special exempt
- JE = Junior exempt
- JR = Junior Accelerator Programme entrant
- CO = College Accelerator Programme entrant
- NG = Next Gen Accelerator Program entrant
- w/o = Walkover
- r = Retired
- d = Defaulted

=== Finals ===
Quarterfinals
16	(Sweden) Thomas Enqvist	2	2
7	(South Africa) Wayne Ferreira	6	6
3	(Sweden) Stefan Edberg	6	2	4
(Spain) Àlex Corretja	1	6	6
(France) Olivier Delaître	6	7^{10}
(United States) Jonathan Stark	4	6^{8}
(United States) Richey Reneberg	5	4
(Germany) Bernd Karbacher	7	6

Semifinals
7	(South Africa) Wayne Ferreira	6	6
(Spain) Àlex Corretja	1	2
(France) Olivier Delaître	7	6
(Germany) Bernd Karbacher	5	4

Final
7	(South Africa) Wayne Ferreira	6	6
(France) Olivier Delaître	2	1

=== Top half ===
==== Section 1 ====
First round
Q	(Zimbabwe) K Ullyett	3	3
(Australia) M Woodforde	6	6
(Colombia) M Hadad	7^{7}	7
LL	(Australia) P Kilderry	6^{4}	5
Q	(South Africa) C Marsh	3	1
16	(Sweden) T Enqvist	6	6
9	(Spain) C Costa	6	7^{7}
(Italy) R Furlan	1	6^{3}
(United States) B Shelton	6	7
Q	(Sweden) J Carlsson	1	5
(Morocco) K Alami	5	0
(United States) J Grabb	7	6

Second round
1	(Croatia) G Ivanišević	3	6	5
(Australia) M Woodforde	6	3	7
(Colombia) M Hadad	2	0
16	(Sweden) T Enqvist	6	6
9	(Spain) C Costa	7^{7}	6
(United States) B Shelton	6^{3}	2
(United States) J Grabb	1	3
7	(South Africa) W Ferreira	6	6

Third round
(Australia) M Woodforde	3	6^{4}
16	(Sweden) T Enqvist	6	7^{7}
9	(Spain) C Costa	6^{7}	7^{7}	2
7	(South Africa) W Ferreira	7^{9}	6^{3}	6

Quarterfinals
16	(Sweden) T Enqvist	2	2
7	(South Africa) W Ferreira	6	6

==== Section 2 ====
First round
WC	(United States) W McGuire	1	6^{1}
(New Zealand) B Steven	6	7^{7}
Q	(United States) J Canter	3	2
(United States) D Wheaton	6	6
(Sweden) H Holm	7	4	4
14	(Netherlands) R Krajicek	5	6	6
12	(Italy) A Gaudenzi	6	6
WC	(Australia) T Woodbridge	3	2
WC	(United States) M Merklein	3	3
(United States) A Krickstein	6	6
(Austria) A Antonitsch	3	6	2
(Spain) À Corretja	6	4	6

Second round
3	(Sweden) S Edberg	6	3	6
(New Zealand) B Steven	2	6	2
(United States) D Wheaton	3	4
14	(Netherlands) R Krajicek	6	6
12	(Italy) A Gaudenzi	6	6
(United States) A Krickstein	4	4
(Spain) À Corretja	1	6	6
5	(United States) J Courier	6	4	3

Third round
3	(Sweden) S Edberg	6	5	6
14	(Netherlands) R Krajicek	1	7	4
12	(Italy) A Gaudenzi	3	1
(Spain) À Corretja	6	6

Quarterfinals
3	(Sweden) S Edberg	6	2	4
(Spain) À Corretja	1	6	6

=== Bottom half ===
==== Section 3 ====
First round
(Canada) G Rusedski	7^{7}	3	7
Q	(The Bahamas) M Knowles	6^{4}	6	5
(France) O Delaître	6	6
Q	(United States) D Flach	3	2
(United Kingdom) J Bates	6	6
11	(Peru) J Yzaga	4	3
13	(Russia) A Volkov	4	6	6
(Sweden) N Kulti	6	3	3
Q	(Sweden) D Engel	3	6^{4}
(United States) J Stark	6	7^{7}
(Germany) M Zoecke	3	3
WC	(Sweden) M Wilander	6	6

Second round
6	(Austria) T Muster	4	6	3
(Canada) G Rusedski	6	3	6
(France) O Delaître	6	6
(United Kingdom) J Bates	3	2
13	(Russia) A Volkov	6	3	2
(United States) J Stark	2	6	6
WC	(Sweden) M Wilander	6	1	6
4	(United States) T Martin	4	6	3

Third round
(Canada) G Rusedski	3	3
(France) O Delaître	6	6
(United States) J Stark	6	6
WC	(Sweden) M Wilander	3	3

Quarterfinals
(France) O Delaître	6	7^{10}
(United States) J Stark	4	6^{8}

==== Section 4 ====
First round
(Germany) A Mronz	2	6	3
(United States) R Reneberg	6	3	6
(Czech Republic) K Nováček	6^{5}	5
WC	(United States) K Kinnear	7^{7}	7
(France) JP Fleurian	2	6^{4}
10	(Australia) J Stoltenberg	6	7^{7}
15	(Spain) J Sánchez	6	6^{3}	1
(Germany) B Karbacher	2	7^{7}	6
(United States) S Bryan	4	6	3
(South Africa) M Ondruska	6	0	6
(Germany) K Braasch	2	1
(Australia) W Masur	6	6

Second round
8	(France) C Pioline	2	2
(United States) R Reneberg	6	6
WC	(United States) K Kinnear	6	1
10	(Australia) J Stoltenberg	3	0^{r}
(Germany) B Karbacher	6	7^{7}
(South Africa) M Ondruska	4	6^{5}
(Australia) W Masur	6^{3}	0
2	(Spain) S Bruguera	7^{7}	6

Third round
(United States) R Reneberg	6	6
WC	(United States) K Kinnear	1	0
(Germany) B Karbacher	7^{7}	7^{7}
2	(Spain) S Bruguera	6^{5}	6^{3}

Quarterfinals
(United States) R Reneberg	5	4
(Germany) B Karbacher	7	6
