= 1999 Generali Open – Doubles =

Doubles
- 1999 Generali Open

Final
- Champions: (South Africa) Chris Haggard (Sweden) Peter Nyborg
- Runners-up: (Spain) Álex Calatrava (Federal Republic of Yugoslavia) Dušan Vemić
- Score: 6–3, 6–7^{(4–7)}, 7–6^{(7–4)}

Details
- Draw: 24
- Seeds: 8

Events
Singles	Doubles
- Austrian Open Kitzbühel

Tom Kempers and Daniel Orsanic were the defending champions, but Kempers did not compete this year. Orsanic teamed up with Tomás Carbonell and lost in the second round to Jürgen Melzer and Alexander Peya.

Chris Haggard and Peter Nyborg won the title by defeating Álex Calatrava and Dušan Vemić 6–3, 6–7^{(4–7)}, 7–6^{(7–4)} in the final.

== Seeds ==
All seeds received a bye to the second round.

1. (Australia) Wayne Arthurs / (Australia) Peter Tramacchi (second round)
2. (Spain) Tomás Carbonell / (Argentina) Daniel Orsanic (second round)
3. (South Africa) Piet Norval / (United States) Jack Waite (second round)
4. (South Africa) Chris Haggard / (Sweden) Peter Nyborg (champions)
5. (United Kingdom) Neil Broad / (South Africa) Lan Bale (second round)
6. (Argentina) Lucas Arnold Ker / (Argentina) Mariano Hood (second round)
7. (United States) Devin Bowen / (North Macedonia) Aleksandar Kitinov (second round)
8. (Czech Republic) Petr Pála / (Czech Republic) Pavel Vízner (quarterfinals)

== Draw ==
Key

- Q = Qualifier
- WC = Wild card
- LL = Lucky loser
- Alt = Alternate
- ITF = ITF entry
- PR = Protected ranking
- SR = Special ranking
- SE = Special exempt
- JE = Junior exempt
- JR = Junior Accelerator Programme entrant
- CO = College Accelerator Programme entrant
- NG = Next Gen Accelerator Program entrant
- w/o = Walkover
- r = Retired
- d = Defaulted

=== Finals ===
Semifinals
Q	(Spain) Álex Calatrava (Federal Republic of Yugoslavia) Dušan Vemić	7^{7}	5	6
WC	(Morocco) Hicham Arazi (Austria) Stefan Koubek	6^{3}	7	4
4	(South Africa) Chris Haggard (Sweden) Peter Nyborg	6^{3}	6	6
WC	(Austria) Jürgen Melzer (Austria) Alexander Peya	7^{7}	4	4

Final
Q	(Spain) Álex Calatrava (Federal Republic of Yugoslavia) Dušan Vemić	3	7^{7}	6^{4}
4	(South Africa) Chris Haggard (Sweden) Peter Nyborg	6	6^{4}	7^{7}

=== Top half ===
First round
(Sweden) T Hildebrand (United States) M Keil	4	6	0^{r}
Q	(Spain) Á Calatrava (Federal Republic of Yugoslavia) D Vemić	6	3	4
(Spain) JI Carrasco (Spain) J Velasco Jr.	6	7^{7}
(Netherlands) S Groen (Israel) E Ran	3	6^{4}
(Australia) A Painter (South Africa) B Talbot	6^{4}	3
WC	(Morocco) H Arazi (Austria) S Koubek	7^{7}	6
(Argentina) M García (Mexico) D Roditi	6	6
(Argentina) F Cabello (Brazil) C Testa	2	0

Second round
1	(Australia) W Arthurs (Australia) P Tramacchi	7^{8}	4	4
Q	(Spain) Á Calatrava (Federal Republic of Yugoslavia) D Vemić	6^{6}	6	6
(Spain) JI Carrasco (Spain) J Velasco Jr.	2	1
8	(Czech Republic) P Pála (Czech Republic) P Vízner	6	6
3	(South Africa) P Norval (United States) J Waite	4	5
WC	(Morocco) H Arazi (Austria) S Koubek	6	7
(Argentina) M García (Mexico) D Roditi	6	6
6	(Argentina) L Arnold Ker (Argentina) M Hood	3	3

Quarterfinals
Q	(Spain) Á Calatrava (Federal Republic of Yugoslavia) D Vemić	7^{7}	3	6
8	(Czech Republic) P Pála (Czech Republic) P Vízner	6^{5}	6	3
WC	(Morocco) H Arazi (Austria) S Koubek	6	6
(Argentina) M García (Mexico) D Roditi	3	4

Semifinals
Q	(Spain) Á Calatrava (Federal Republic of Yugoslavia) D Vemić	7^{7}	5	6
WC	(Morocco) H Arazi (Austria) S Koubek	6^{3}	7	4

=== Bottom half ===
First round
(Brazil) F Meligeni (Brazil) J Oncins	6	7
(Spain) A Martín (Argentina) M Rodríguez	4	5
(Russia) A Olhovskiy (Russia) M Safin	6^{3}	6	7
(Austria) G Mandl (Austria) T Strengberger	7^{7}	4	5
WC	(Spain) J Alonso (Austria) M Hipfl	3	2
(Germany) MK Goellner (United States) F Montana	6	6
WC	(Austria) J Melzer (Austria) A Peya	4	6	6
(Federal Republic of Yugoslavia) N Đorđević (Armenia) S Sargsian	6	3	4

Second round
5	(United Kingdom) N Broad (South Africa) L Bale	4	2
(Brazil) F Meligeni (Brazil) J Oncins	6	6
(Russia) A Olhovskiy (Russia) M Safin	7^{7}	4	4
4	(South Africa) C Haggard (Sweden) P Nyborg	6^{5}	6	6
7	(United States) D Bowen (North Macedonia) A Kitinov	7^{7}	3	4
(Germany) MK Goellner (United States) F Montana	6^{2}	6	6
WC	(Austria) J Melzer (Austria) A Peya	7^{7}	6
2	(Spain) T Carbonell (Argentina) D Orsanic	6^{3}	4

Quarterfinals
(Brazil) F Meligeni (Brazil) J Oncins	3	5
4	(South Africa) C Haggard (Sweden) P Nyborg	6	7
(Germany) MK Goellner (United States) F Montana	6	1	5
WC	(Austria) J Melzer (Austria) A Peya	3	6	7

Semifinals
4	(South Africa) C Haggard (Sweden) P Nyborg	6^{3}	6	6
WC	(Austria) J Melzer (Austria) A Peya	7^{7}	4	4
