= 1994 RCA Championships – Doubles =

Doubles
- 1994 RCA Championships

Final
- Champions: (Australia) Todd Woodbridge (Australia) Mark Woodforde
- Runners-up: (United States) Jim Grabb (United States) Richey Reneberg
- Score: 6–3, 6–4

Details
- Draw: 28 (5WC/2Q)
- Seeds: 8

Events
| Singles | Doubles |
- Indianapolis Tennis Championships

Scott Davis and Todd Martin were the defending champions, but Martin chose to focus only on the singles tournament, being eliminated in the second round. Davis teamed up with Jonathan Stark and lost in the second round to Jorge Lozano and Jim Pugh.

Todd Woodbridge and Mark Woodforde won the title by defeating Jim Grabb and Richey Reneberg 6–3, 6–4 in the final.

== Seeds ==
The top four seeds received a bye into the second round.

1. (Australia) Todd Woodbridge / (Australia) Mark Woodforde (champions)
2. (United States) Scott Davis / (United States) Jonathan Stark (second round)
3. (United States) Scott Melville / (South Africa) Piet Norval (second round)
4. (United States) Rick Leach / (South Africa) Danie Visser (second round)
5. (South Africa) Wayne Ferreira / (The Bahamas) Mark Knowles (semifinals)
6. (United States) Jim Grabb / (United States) Richey Reneberg (final)
7. (Australia) Mark Kratzmann / (Spain) Javier Sánchez (first round)
8. (Australia) Darren Cahill / (Australia) John Fitzgerald (second round)

== Draw ==
Key

- Q = Qualifier
- WC = Wild card
- LL = Lucky loser
- Alt = Alternate
- ITF = ITF entry
- PR = Protected ranking
- SR = Special ranking
- SE = Special exempt
- JE = Junior exempt
- JR = Junior Accelerator Programme entrant
- CO = College Accelerator Programme entrant
- NG = Next Gen Accelerator Program entrant
- w/o = Walkover
- r = Retired
- d = Defaulted

=== Finals ===
Semifinals
1 | (Australia) Todd Woodbridge (Australia) Mark Woodforde | 4 | 6 | 6
5 | (South Africa) Wayne Ferreira (The Bahamas) Mark Knowles | 6 | 1 | 4
6 | (United States) Jim Grabb (United States) Richey Reneberg | 6 | 6
(France) Olivier Delaître (Australia) Wally Masur | 2 | 0

Final
1 | (Australia) Todd Woodbridge (Australia) Mark Woodforde | 6 | 6
6 | (United States) Jim Grabb (United States) Richey Reneberg | 3 | 4

=== Top half ===
First round
(United States) D Flach (United States) K Flach | 6 | 5 | 6
(United States) D Pate (United States) B Pearce | 3 | 7 | 2
(United States) K Kinnear (United States) D Wheaton | 6 | 3 | 6
WC | (Czech Republic) K Nováček (Sweden) M Wilander | 3 | 6 | 4
Q | (Morocco) K Alami (Russia) A Volkov | 5 | 3
8 | (Australia) D Cahill (Australia) J Fitzgerald | 7 | 6
(Australia) A Florent (Australia) P Kilderry | 6 | 6
WC | (United States) B Shelton (United States) T Witsken | 3 | 4
(South Africa) M Ondruska (South Africa) B Talbot | 1 | 4
(South Africa) L Bale (New Zealand) B Steven | 6 | 6
(United Kingdom) J Bates (Germany) A Mronz | 3 | 5
5 | (South Africa) W Ferreira (The Bahamas) M Knowles | 6 | 7

Second round
1 | (Australia) T Woodbridge (Australia) M Woodforde | 6 | 6
(United States) D Flach (United States) K Flach | 3 | 4
(United States) K Kinnear (United States) D Wheaton | 3 | 7 | 6
8 | (Australia) D Cahill (Australia) J Fitzgerald | 6 | 5 | 3
4 | (United States) R Leach (South Africa) D Visser | 3 | 7 | 2
(Australia) A Florent (Australia) P Kilderry | 6 | 6 | 6
(South Africa) L Bale (New Zealand) B Steven | 2 | 6 | 1
5 | (South Africa) W Ferreira (The Bahamas) M Knowles | 6 | 1 | 6

Quarterfinals
1 | (Australia) T Woodbridge (Australia) M Woodforde | 6 | 2 | 6
(United States) K Kinnear (United States) D Wheaton | 2 | 6 | 4
(Australia) A Florent (Australia) P Kilderry | 7 | 6 | 2
5 | (South Africa) W Ferreira (The Bahamas) M Knowles | 5 | 7 | 6

Semifinals
1 | (Australia) T Woodbridge (Australia) M Woodforde | 4 | 6 | 6
5 | (South Africa) W Ferreira (The Bahamas) M Knowles | 6 | 1 | 4

=== Bottom half ===
First round
6 | (United States) J Grabb (United States) R Reneberg | 6 | 6
(Sweden) R Bergh (United States) D Randall | 2 | 2
(South Africa) E Ferreira (Zimbabwe) K Ullyett | 4 | 6 | 6
WC | (Spain) S Bruguera (Canada) G Rusedski | 6 | 2 | 3
WC | (United States) B MacPhie (United States) D Witt | 7 | 7
WC | (Sweden) H Holm (Croatia) G Ivanišević | 6 | 5
7 | (Australia) M Kratzmann (Spain) J Sánchez | 6 | 6 | 6
(France) O Delaître (Australia) W Masur | 3 | 7 | 7
(Sweden) N Kulti (Sweden) M Larsson | 4 | 3
(South Africa) JL de Jager (United States) B Devening | 6 | 6
(Mexico) J Lozano (United States) J Pugh | 6 | 6
Q | (United States) Michael Hopkinson (Italy) D Sanguinetti | 4 | 1

Second round
6 | (United States) J Grabb (United States) R Reneberg | 6 | 6
(South Africa) E Ferreira (Zimbabwe) K Ullyett | 4 | 4
WC | (United States) B MacPhie (United States) D Witt | 7 | 6
3 | (United States) S Melville (South Africa) P Norval | 6 | 3
(France) O Delaître (Australia) W Masur | 6 | 6
(South Africa) JL de Jager (United States) B Devening | 2 | 3
(Mexico) J Lozano (United States) J Pugh | 6 | 6
2 | (United States) S Davis (United States) J Stark | 4 | 3

Quarterfinals
6 | (United States) J Grabb (United States) R Reneberg | 6 | 6
WC | (United States) B MacPhie (United States) D Witt | 4 | 2
(France) O Delaître (Australia) W Masur | 4 | 6 | 6
(Mexico) J Lozano (United States) J Pugh | 6 | 3 | 2

Semifinals
6 | (United States) J Grabb (United States) R Reneberg | 6 | 6
(France) O Delaître (Australia) W Masur | 2 | 0
