= 1993 RCA Championships =

- Date: August 16–22
- Edition: 6th
- Category: Championship Series
- Draw: 56S / 28D
- Prize money: $915,000
- Surface: Hard / outdoor
- Location: Indianapolis, IN, U.S.
- Venue: Indianapolis Tennis Center

Champions

Singles
- (United States) Jim Courier

Doubles
- (United States) Scott Davis / (United States) Todd Martin
← 1992 ·	Indianapolis Tennis Championships	· 1994 →

The 1993 RCA Championships was a men's tennis tournament played on outdoor hard courts at the Indianapolis Tennis Center in Indianapolis, Indiana in the United States that was part of the Championship Series of the 1993 ATP Tour. It was the sixth edition of the tournament and was held from August 16 through August 22, 1993. Second-seeded Jim Courier won the singles title.

== Finals ==
=== Singles ===
(United States) Jim Courier defeated (Germany) Boris Becker 7–5, 6–3

- It was Courier's 5th singles title of the year and the 12th of his career.

=== Doubles ===
(United States) Scott Davis / (United States) Todd Martin defeated (United States) Ken Flach / (United States) Rick Leach 3–6, 6–3, 6–2

- It was Davis' 2nd doubles title of the year and the 21st of his career. It was Martin's 2nd doubles title of the year and of his career.
