= 1996 Bournemouth International – Doubles =

Doubles
- 1996 Bournemouth International

Final
- Champions: (Germany) Marc-Kevin Goellner (United Kingdom) Greg Rusedski
- Runners-up: (France) Rodolphe Gilbert (Portugal) Nuno Marques
- Score: 6–3, 7–6

Details
- Draw: 16
- Seeds: 4

Events
Singles	Doubles
Bournemouth International	· 1997 →

Marc-Kevin Goellner and Greg Rusedski won in the final 6–3, 7–6 against Rodolphe Gilbert and Nuno Marques.

== Seeds ==
Champion seeds are indicated in bold text while text in italics indicates the round in which those seeds were eliminated.

1. (United Kingdom) Neil Broad / (South Africa) Piet Norval (first round)
2. (Netherlands) Stephen Noteboom / (United States) Jack Waite (semifinals)
3. (Netherlands) Tom Kempers / (Netherlands) Tom Nijssen (quarterfinals)
4. (France) Rodolphe Gilbert / (Portugal) Nuno Marques (final)

== Draw ==
=== Key ===
- Q = Qualifier
- WC = Wild card
- LL = Lucky loser
- Alt = Alternate
- SE = Special exempt
- PR = Protected ranking
- ITF = ITF entry
- JE = Junior exempt
- w/o = Walkover
- r = Retired
- d = Defaulted
- SR = Special ranking

First round
1	(United Kingdom) N Broad (South Africa) P Norval	6	2
(Sweden) **P Fredriksson** (Sweden) **M Norman**	**7**	**6**
Q	(United Kingdom) A Parmar (United Kingdom) P Robinson	3	**7**	2
(Portugal) **B Mota** (Czech Republic) **D Škoch**	**6**	6	**6**
4	(France) **R Gilbert** (Portugal) **N Marques**	**6**	**6**
(Spain) E Benfele Álvarez (Argentina) M Zabaleta	1	3
(Latvia) **Ģ Dzelde** (Slovakia) **D Hrbatý**	**6**	**6**
(United Kingdom) J Delgado (United Kingdom) M Lee	2	4
(Germany) **M-K Goellner** (United Kingdom) **G Rusedski**	**6**	**6**
WC	(Spain) S Bruguera (Spain) A Costa	4	4
WC	(United Kingdom) B Cowan (United Kingdom) L Milligan	3	2
3	(Netherlands) **T Kempers** (Netherlands) **T Nijssen**	**6**	**6**
(Argentina) **D Orsanic** (South Africa) **G Steenkamp**	**6**	6	**6**
(United Kingdom) A Richardson (United Kingdom) D Sapsford	3	**7**	3
WC	(United Kingdom) C Beecher (United Kingdom) N Weal	1	3
2	(Netherlands) **S Noteboom** (United States) **J Waite**	**6**	**6**

Quarterfinals
(Sweden) P Fredriksson (Sweden) M Norman	2	3
(Portugal) **B Mota** (Czech Republic) **D Škoch**	**6**	**6**
4	(France) **R Gilbert** (Portugal) **N Marques**	3	**7**	**6**
(Latvia) Ģ Dzelde (Slovakia) D Hrbatý	**6**	5	2
(Germany) **M-K Goellner** (United Kingdom) **G Rusedski**	**7**	**6**
3	(Netherlands) T Kempers (Netherlands) T Nijssen	6	3
(Argentina) D Orsanic (South Africa) G Steenkamp	**6**	1	2
2	(Netherlands) **S Noteboom** (United States) **J Waite**	4	**6**	**6**

Semifinals
(Portugal) B Mota (Czech Republic) D Škoch	3	4
4	(France) **R Gilbert** (Portugal) **N Marques**	**6**	**6**
(Germany) **M-K Goellner** (United Kingdom) **G Rusedski**	**6**	1	**6**
2	(Netherlands) S Noteboom (United States) J Waite	3	**6**	3

Final
4	(France) Rodolphe Gilbert (Portugal) Nuno Marques	3	6
(Germany) **Marc-Kevin Goellner** (United Kingdom) **Greg Rusedski**	**6**	**7**
