= Rick Witsken =

American athlete

Rick Witsken (born January 1972) is a former American tennis player and pickleball player, tennis coach, and entrepreneur. He is the founder of Team Witsken and co-founder of the National Pickleball League (NPL).

== Education ==
He was a State Champion in Carmel High School in 1987 and 1988. Witsken pursued a bachelor's degree in Sports Management and Marketing from the University of Alabama. At the University of Alabama, he was an NCAA tennis player and a two-time All-American.

== Career ==
Witsken began his post-playing career working with his brother, Todd Witsken, at the Indianapolis Tennis Center. He was the director of tennis at Woodstock Country Club. He coaches Zionsville Eagle Rec and is the assistant coach of the Zionsville boys and girls middle school teams.

After his brother died in 1998, Witsken formulated Team Witsken Tennis in 2001. It is an organization that provides professional instruction to tennis and pickleball players in Indianapolis. In 2010, Witsken represented the US in the Tony Trabert Cup in New Zealand. In 2011, he and Matt Schiller defeated Matt Allare and Steve Williams 6-4, 2-6, 6-3 in the men's open final of the Bernard Master Tennis Classic.

In 2021, he organized a 2-day match at Brickway Tennis and Pickleball Club. In 2014, Witsken started competing in pickleball tournaments professionally. Witsken founded the first public educational middle school pickleball team at Zionsville Middle School.

Witsken and his wife, Bridget Witsken, lobbied to bring a pickleball tournament to Indianapolis and secured the Indianapolis Pickleball Open, an Association of Pickleball Players tournament.

In 2020, Witsken brought the first-ever pro pickleball tournament, the Indy Open, to Zionsville. In December 2022, he established NPL with Beth Bellamy. www.USA-NPL.com In 2022, Witsken hosted the Pickleball tournament, the APP $35k Indianapolis Open, at Mt. Vernon High School in Fortville, Indiana, sponsored by Arnold Meyer Realty. In January 2023, Nike Pickleball Camps, a division of US Sports Camps, teamed up with Witsken to offer multiple camp sessions at different locations in the US.

== Accomplishments ==
Witsken is a two-time IHSAA State Singles Champion and Indiana State Champion. He received five gold medals at the U.S. Open Pickleball Championships. In 2019, Witsken won gold in Men's Open Doubles at International Indoor Pickleball Championship. He earned gold in Pro Men's Doubles in Atlanta, Georgia and at the Association of Pickleball Professionals Sacramento Open in 2022.

He was world-ranked on the ATP Tour in both singles and doubles. Witsken is ranked #1 on the APP Senior Pro Men's Standings and Pickleball Professional in America for Pro-Seniors.

== Personal life ==
Witsken lives with his wife and three children in Zionsville, Indiana. Witsken's nephew is fellow American tennis player Ben Shelton.
