= 1994 EA Generali Open – Doubles =

Doubles
- 1994 EA Generali Open

Final
- Champions: (South Africa) David Adams (Russia) Andrei Olhovskiy
- Runners-up: (Spain) Sergio Casal (Spain) Emilio Sánchez
- Score: 6–7, 6–3, 7–5

Details
- Draw: 24
- Seeds: 8

Events
Singles	Doubles
- Austrian Open Kitzbühel

Juan Garat and Roberto Saad were the defending champions, but Garat did not compete this year. Saad teamed up with Patricio Arnold and lost in the quarterfinals to David Adams and Andrei Olhovskiy.

Adams and Olhovskiy won the title by defeating Sergio Casal and Emilio Sánchez 6–7, 6–3, 7–5 in the final.

== Seeds ==
All seeds received a bye to the second round.

1. (South Africa) David Adams / (Russia) Andrei Olhovskiy (champions)
2. (Spain) Sergio Casal / (Spain) Emilio Sánchez (final)
3. (Italy) Diego Nargiso / (Germany) Udo Riglewski (second round)
4. (Italy) Cristian Brandi / (Italy) Federico Mordegan (semifinals)
5. (Australia) Jon Ireland / (United States) Jack Waite (quarterfinals)
6. (Netherlands) Sander Groen / (United States) Mark Keil (quarterfinals)
7. (Argentina) Patricio Arnold / (Argentina) Roberto Saad (quarterfinals)
8. (Belgium) Filip Dewulf / (Belgium) Tom Vanhoudt (second round)

== Draw ==
Key

- Q = Qualifier
- WC = Wild card
- LL = Lucky loser
- Alt = Alternate
- ITF = ITF entry
- PR = Protected ranking
- SR = Special ranking
- SE = Special exempt
- JE = Junior exempt
- JR = Junior Accelerator Programme entrant
- CO = College Accelerator Programme entrant
- NG = Next Gen Accelerator Program entrant
- w/o = Walkover
- r = Retired
- d = Defaulted

=== Finals ===
Semifinals
1	(South Africa) David Adams (Russia) Andrei Olhovskiy	6	6
(Spain) Jordi Burillo (Spain) Tomás Carbonell	4	3
4	(Italy) Cristian Brandi (Italy) Federico Mordegan	6	6
2	(Spain) Sergio Casal (Spain) Emilio Sánchez	7	7

Final
1	(South Africa) David Adams (Russia) Andrei Olhovskiy	6	6	7
2	(Spain) Sergio Casal (Spain) Emilio Sánchez	7	3	5

=== Top half ===
First round
(Hungary) S Noszály (Austria) H Skoff	7	0
(Morocco) Y El Aynoui (Croatia) G Ivanišević	6	1^{r}
(Italy) M Ardinghi (Italy) F Messori	5	1
WC	(Austria) J Knowle (Austria) G Schaller	7	6
(Spain) J Burillo (Spain) T Carbonell	6	6
WC	(Argentina) G Mirad (Spain) JA Viloca	1	2
(Spain) J Arrese (Spain) A López Morón	6	1	7
(Spain) E Benfele Álvarez (Spain) J Mas	2	6	6

Second round
1	(South Africa) D Adams (Russia) A Olhovskiy	6	6
(Hungary) S Noszály (Austria) H Skoff	4	3
WC	(Austria) J Knowle (Austria) G Schaller	3	2
7	(Argentina) P Arnold (Argentina) R Saad	6	6
3	(Italy) D Nargiso (Germany) U Riglewski	2	3
(Spain) J Burillo (Spain) T Carbonell	6	6
(Spain) J Arrese (Spain) A López Morón	3	6	3
6	(Netherlands) S Groen (United States) M Keil	6	3	6

Quarterfinals
1	(South Africa) D Adams (Russia) A Olhovskiy	6	6	6
7	(Argentina) P Arnold (Argentina) R Saad	3	7	2
(Spain) J Burillo (Spain) T Carbonell	6	7
6	(Netherlands) S Groen (United States) M Keil	1	5

Semifinals
1	(South Africa) D Adams (Russia) A Olhovskiy	6	6
(Spain) J Burillo (Spain) T Carbonell	4	3

=== Bottom half ===
First round
Q	(Georgia (country)) V Gabrichidze (Poland) W Kowalski	2	3
(Italy) R Furlan (Italy) A Gaudenzi	6	6
(Sweden) J Donar (Sweden) Y Nydahl	7	7
(Haiti) R Agénor (France) G Solvès	6	6
(Uruguay) M Filippini (Uruguay) D Pérez	6	6
(Chile) S Cortés (New Zealand) G Wilson	2	3
(Ukraine) D Poliakov (France) F Santoro	6	6
WC	(Austria) S Koubek (Austria) H Wiltschnig	4	1

Second round
5	(Australia) J Ireland (United States) J Waite	5	6	6
(Italy) R Furlan (Italy) A Gaudenzi	7	3	2
(Sweden) J Donar (Sweden) Y Nydahl
4	(Italy) C Brandi (Italy) F Mordegan	w/o
8	(Belgium) F Dewulf (Belgium) T Vanhoudt	5	6
(Uruguay) M Filippini (Uruguay) D Pérez	7	7
(Ukraine) D Poliakov (France) F Santoro	3	2
2	(Spain) S Casal (Spain) E Sánchez	6	6

Quarterfinals
5	(Australia) J Ireland (United States) J Waite	6	3
4	(Italy) C Brandi (Italy) F Mordegan	7	6
(Uruguay) M Filippini (Uruguay) D Pérez	2	0
2	(Spain) S Casal (Spain) E Sánchez	6	6

Semifinals
4	(Italy) C Brandi (Italy) F Mordegan	6	6
2	(Spain) S Casal (Spain) E Sánchez	7	7
