= 1995 EA Generali Open – Singles =

Singles
- 1995 EA Generali Open

Final
- Champion: (Spain) Albert Costa
- Runner-up: (Austria) Thomas Muster
- Score: 4–6, 6–4, 7–6^{(7–3)}, 2–6, 6–4

Details
- Draw: 48 (4WC/6Q)
- Seeds: 16

Events
Singles	Doubles
- Austrian Open Kitzbühel

Goran Ivanišević was the defending champion but chose to compete at Los Angeles during the same week, reaching the semifinals.

Fifth-seeded Albert Costa won the title by defeating Thomas Muster 4–6, 6–4, 7–6^{(7–3)}, 2–6, 6–4 in the final.

== Seeds ==
All seeds receive a bye into the second round.

1. (Austria) Thomas Muster (final)
2. (Spain) Sergi Bruguera (third round)
3. (Spain) Alberto Berasategui (quarterfinals)
4. (Italy) Andrea Gaudenzi (quarterfinals)
5. (Spain) Albert Costa (champion)
6. (Austria) Gilbert Schaller (semifinals)
7. (Spain) Francisco Clavet (second round)
8. (Germany) Bernd Karbacher (semifinals)
9. (Italy) Renzo Furlan (second round)
10. (Brazil) Fernando Meligeni (third round)
11. (Romania) Adrian Voinea (third round)
12. (Spain) Jordi Arrese (third round)
13. (Spain) Tomás Carbonell (second round)
14. (Uruguay) Marcelo Filippini (third round)
15. (Denmark) Frederik Fetterlein (third round)
16. (Spain) Emilio Sánchez (second round)

== Draw ==
Key

- Q = Qualifier
- WC = Wild card
- LL = Lucky loser
- Alt = Alternate
- ITF = ITF entry
- PR = Protected ranking
- SR = Special ranking
- SE = Special exempt
- JE = Junior exempt
- JR = Junior Accelerator Programme entrant
- CO = College Accelerator Programme entrant
- NG = Next Gen Accelerator Program entrant
- w/o = Walkover
- r = Retired
- d = Defaulted

=== Finals ===
Quarterfinals
1	(Austria) Thomas Muster	7^{7}	6
(Hungary) Sándor Noszály	6^{1}	3
3	(Spain) Alberto Berasategui	5	4
6	(Austria) Gilbert Schaller	7	6
5	(Spain) Albert Costa	6	7^{7}
4	(Italy) Andrea Gaudenzi	2	6^{4}
8	(Germany) Bernd Karbacher	7	7
(Italy) Stefano Pescosolido	5	5

Semifinals
1	(Austria) Thomas Muster	6	6^{1}	6
6	(Austria) Gilbert Schaller	3	7^{7}	3
5	(Spain) Albert Costa	6	6
8	(Germany) Bernd Karbacher	2	4

Final
1	(Austria) Thomas Muster	6	4	6^{3}	6	4
5	(Spain) Albert Costa	4	6	7^{7}	2	6

=== Top half ===
==== Section 1 ====
First round
Q	(Austria) T Buchmayer	6	6^{1}	4
(United States) S Campbell	2	7^{7}	6
(Czech Republic) V Roubíček	6	6
WC	(Austria) A Antonitsch	3	2
Q	(Spain) C Moyá	6	4	6
WC	(Romania) D Pescariu	4	6	3
Q	(Italy) D Balducci	3	6^{6}
(Hungary) S Noszály	6	7^{8}

Second round
1	(Austria) T Muster	6	6
(United States) S Campbell	3	3
(Czech Republic) V Roubíček	6	1	3
15	(Denmark) F Fetterlein	2	6	6
9	(Italy) R Furlan	4	6^{5}
Q	(Spain) C Moyá	6	7^{7}
(Hungary) S Noszály	6	2	6
7	(Spain) F Clavet	3	6	3

Third round
1	(Austria) T Muster	6	6
15	(Denmark) F Fetterlein	3	3
Q	(Spain) C Moyá	4	4
(Hungary) S Noszály	6	6

Quarterfinals
1	(Austria) T Muster	7^{7}	6
(Hungary) S Noszály	6^{1}	3

==== Section 2 ====
First round
(Spain) JA Viloca	4	1
(France) G Solvès	6	6
(France) T Guardiola	6	6
(Portugal) E Couto	3	4
WC	(Austria) C Trimmel	5	4
(Spain) E Benfele Álvarez	7	6
(Italy) D Musa	6^{8}	6	6
WC	(Austria) H Wiltschnig	7^{10}	1	4

Second round
3	(Spain) A Berasategui	6	5	6
(France) G Solvès	3	7	3
(France) T Guardiola	3	4
14	(Uruguay) M Filippini	6	6
12	(Spain) J Arrese	6	6
(Spain) E Benfele Álvarez	4	4
(Italy) D Musa	4	6	4
6	(Austria) G Schaller	6	3	6

Third round
3	(Spain) A Berasategui	6	7^{7}
14	(Uruguay) M Filippini	3	6^{1}
12	(Spain) J Arrese	4	6	4
6	(Austria) G Schaller	6	3	6

Quarterfinals
3	(Spain) A Berasategui	5	4
6	(Austria) G Schaller	7	6

=== Bottom half ===
==== Section 3 ====
First round
Q	(Sweden) N Utgren	6	6^{6}	4
(South Africa) D Nainkin	4	7^{8}	6
(Argentina) M Charpentier	7^{7}	4	6
(Spain) A Mancisidor	6^{5}	6	3
(Israel) E Ran	4	6^{5}
(Australia) A Ilie	6	7^{7}
(Germany) P Baur	7^{7}	6
(Italy) D Nargiso	6^{0}	4

Second round
5	(Spain) A Costa	6	6
(South Africa) D Nainkin	3	4
(Argentina) M Charpentier	3	6^{4}
11	(Romania) A Voinea	6	7^{7}
13	(Spain) T Carbonell	3	2
(Australia) A Ilie	6	6
(Germany) P Baur	2	4
4	(Italy) A Gaudenzi	6	6

Third round
5	(Spain) A Costa	6	6
11	(Romania) A Voinea	3	4
(Australia) A Ilie	0	1
4	(Italy) A Gaudenzi	6	6

Quarterfinals
5	(Spain) A Costa	6	7^{7}
4	(Italy) A Gaudenzi	2	6^{4}

==== Section 4 ====
First round
(Ukraine) D Poliakov	6^{5}	5
(Spain) A López Morón	7^{7}	7
(Morocco) H Arazi	5	6	3
Q	(Romania) A Pavel	7	3	6
(Italy) S Pescosolido	6	6
(Italy) D Sanguinetti	3	2
(Argentina) C Miniussi	3	6	3
Q	(Spain) P Imaz	6	2	6

Second round
8	(Germany) B Karbacher	7^{7}	5	7
(Spain) A López Morón	6^{2}	7	5
Q	(Romania) A Pavel	5	0^{r}
10	(Brazil) F Meligeni	7	2
16	(Spain) E Sánchez	4	4
(Italy) S Pescosolido	6	6
Q	(Spain) P Imaz	1	4
2	(Spain) S Bruguera	6	6

Third round
8	(Germany) B Karbacher	6	5	6
10	(Brazil) F Meligeni	4	7	3
(Italy) S Pescosolido	6	7
2	(Spain) S Bruguera	4	5

Quarterfinals
8	(Germany) B Karbacher	7	7
(Italy) S Pescosolido	5	5
