= 1999 Generali Open – Singles =

Singles
- 1999 Generali Open

Final
- Champion: (Spain) Albert Costa
- Runner-up: (Spain) Fernando Vicente
- Score: 7–5, 6–2, 6–7^{(5–7)}, 7–6^{(7–4)}

Details
- Draw: 48 (4WC/6Q)
- Seeds: 16

Events
Singles	Doubles
- Austrian Open Kitzbühel

Fifth-seeded Albert Costa was the defending champion and successfully defended his title, by defeating Fernando Vicente 7–5, 6–2, 6–7^{(5–7)}, 7–6^{(7–4)} in the final.

== Seeds ==
All seeds received a bye to the second round.

1. (Russia) Yevgeny Kafelnikov (semifinals)
2. (Slovakia) Karol Kučera (third round)
3. (Spain) Àlex Corretja (third round)
4. (Germany) Tommy Haas (second round)
5. (Spain) Albert Costa (champion)
6. (Ecuador) Nicolás Lapentti (quarterfinals)
7. (Brazil) Fernando Meligeni (quarterfinals)
8. (Morocco) Younes El Aynaoui (second round)
9. (Ukraine) Andrei Medvedev (third round)
10. (Russia) Marat Safin (second round)
11. (Argentina) Franco Squillari (second round)
12. (Morocco) Hicham Arazi (third round)
13. (Spain) Fernando Vicente (final)
14. (Czech Republic) Daniel Vacek (third round)
15. (Austria) Stefan Koubek (semifinals)
16. (Spain) Alberto Martín (third round)

== Draw ==
Key

- Q = Qualifier
- WC = Wild card
- LL = Lucky loser
- Alt = Alternate
- ITF = ITF entry
- PR = Protected ranking
- SR = Special ranking
- SE = Special exempt
- JE = Junior exempt
- JR = Junior Accelerator Programme entrant
- CO = College Accelerator Programme entrant
- NG = Next Gen Accelerator Program entrant
- w/o = Walkover
- r = Retired
- d = Defaulted

=== Finals ===
Quarterfinals
1	(Russia) Yevgeny Kafelnikov	6	6^{6}	6
(Australia) Richard Fromberg	3	7^{8}	3
(Spain) Juan Carlos Ferrero	6	2	3
5	(Spain) Albert Costa	3	6	6
6	(Ecuador) Nicolás Lapentti	7^{7}	1	3
13	(Spain) Fernando Vicente	6^{4}	6	6
7	(Brazil) Fernando Meligeni	2	3
15	(Austria) Stefan Koubek	6	6

Semifinals
1	(Russia) Yevgeny Kafelnikov	6^{5}	2
5	(Spain) Albert Costa	7^{7}	6
13	(Spain) Fernando Vicente	6	6
15	(Austria) Stefan Koubek	4	4

Final
5	(Spain) Albert Costa	7	6	6^{5}	7^{7}
13	(Spain) Fernando Vicente	5	2	7^{7}	6^{4}

=== Top half ===
==== Section 1 ====
First round
WC	(Austria) W Eschauer	4	5
(Czech Republic) S Doseděl	6	7
(Argentina) L Arnold Ker	3	2
Q	(Austria) H Wiltschnig	6	6
(Australia) R Fromberg	6	6
(Uruguay) M Filippini	4	2
WC	(Spain) J Alonso	6	6
(Argentina) JI Chela	0	3

Second round
1	(Russia) Y Kafelnikov	7^{7}	1	6
(Czech Republic) S Doseděl	6^{3}	6	3
Q	(Austria) H Wiltschnig	2	2
16	(Spain) A Martín	6	6
10	(Russia) M Safin	3	2
(Australia) R Fromberg	6	6
WC	(Spain) J Alonso	6	1	7
8	(Morocco) Y El Aynaoui	2	6	5

Third round
1	(Russia) Y Kafelnikov	1	6	6
16	(Spain) A Martín	6	4	3
(Australia) R Fromberg	5	6	7
WC	(Spain) J Alonso	7	3	5

Quarterfinals
1	(Russia) Y Kafelnikov	6	6^{6}	6
(Australia) R Fromberg	3	7^{8}	3

==== Section 2 ====
First round
(Spain) JC Ferrero	6	6
(Sweden) M Gustafsson	1	2
Q	(Russia) A Cherkasov	6	6
Q	(Australia) S Randjelovic	2	2
(Slovakia) J Krošlák	1	6^{3}
(Romania) A Voinea	6	7^{7}
(Germany) M Kohlmann	6	4	6
(Argentina) E Medica	1	6	4

Second round
4	(Germany) T Haas	6	6^{4}	3
(Spain) JC Ferrero	3	7^{7}	6
Q	(Russia) A Cherkasov	3	6	5
14	(Czech Republic) D Vacek	6	0	7
12	(Morocco) H Arazi	6^{2}	7^{7}	7
(Romania) A Voinea	7^{7}	6^{5}	5
(Germany) M Kohlmann	4	4
5	(Spain) A Costa	6	6

Third round
(Spain) JC Ferrero	7^{7}	6
14	(Czech Republic) D Vacek	6^{1}	0
12	(Morocco) H Arazi	2	4
5	(Spain) A Costa	6	6

Quarterfinals
(Spain) JC Ferrero	6	2	3
5	(Spain) A Costa	3	6	6

=== Bottom half ===
==== Section 3 ====
First round
(Argentina) M Rodríguez	3	2
(Austria) M Hipfl	6	6
(Argentina) H Gumy	4	6	5
WC	(Austria) W Schranz	6	4	7
WC	(Austria) T Schiessling	5	2
(Italy) A Gaudenzi	7	6
Q	(Spain) Á Calatrava	4	1
(Bulgaria) O Stanoytchev	6	6

Second round
6	(Ecuador) N Lapentti	6	6
(Austria) M Hipfl	3	0
WC	(Austria) W Schranz	7^{7}	6
11	(Argentina) F Squillari	6^{4}	1
13	(Spain) F Vicente	6	6
(Italy) A Gaudenzi	2	3
(Bulgaria) O Stanoytchev	3	4
3	(Spain) À Corretja	6	6

Third round
6	(Ecuador) N Lapentti	6	6
WC	(Austria) W Schranz	4	3
13	(Spain) F Vicente	6	6
3	(Spain) À Corretja	4	4

Quarterfinals
6	(Ecuador) N Lapentti	7^{7}	1	3
13	(Spain) F Vicente	6^{4}	6	6

==== Section 4 ====
First round
(Argentina) G Gaudio	5	1
(Armenia) S Sargsian	7	6
(Belgium) X Malisse	2	4
(Germany) B Karbacher	6	6
(Italy) M Navarra	4	4
Q	(Argentina) F Cabello	6	6
Q	(Australia) W Arthurs	7^{8}	6
(Spain) G Blanco	6^{6}	4

Second round
7	(Brazil) F Meligeni	6	6
(Armenia) S Sargsian	4	2
(Germany) B Karbacher	2	2
9	(Ukraine) A Medvedev	6	6
15	(Austria) S Koubek	7^{7}	6
Q	(Argentina) F Cabello	6^{4}	3
Q	(Australia) W Arthurs	3	4
2	(Slovakia) K Kučera	6	6

Third round
7	(Brazil) F Meligeni	6	6
9	(Ukraine) A Medvedev	1	3
15	(Austria) S Koubek	7^{7}	6
2	(Slovakia) K Kučera	6^{3}	4

Quarterfinals
7	(Brazil) F Meligeni	2	3
15	(Austria) S Koubek	6	6
