= 1998 Generali Open – Singles =

Singles
- 1998 Generali Open

Final
- Champion: (Spain) Albert Costa
- Runner-up: (Italy) Andrea Gaudenzi
- Score: 6–2, 1–6, 6–2, 3–6, 6–1

Details
- Draw: 48
- Seeds: 16

Events
Singles	Doubles
- Generali Open

The 1998 Generali Open was a men's tennis tournament played on outdoor clay courts in Kitzbühel, Austria that was part of the International Series of the 1998 ATP Tour. It was the forty-third edition of the tournament and was held from 27 July – 2 August 1998. Second-seeded Albert Costa won the singles title, by defeating Andrea Gaudenzi in the final 6–2, 1–6, 6–2, 3–6, 6–1.

== Seeds ==
Champion seeds are indicated in bold text while text in italics indicates the round in which those seeds were eliminated.

1. (Russia) Yevgeny Kafelnikov (third round)
2. (Spain) **Albert Costa (champion)**
3. (Spain) Alberto Berasategui (second round)
4. (Austria) Thomas Muster (third round)
5. (Spain) Andrea Gaudenzi (semifinals)
6. (Italy) Andrea Gaudenzi (final)
7. (Australia) Richard Fromberg (quarterfinals)
8. (Czech Republic) Ctislav Doseděl (second round)
9. (Spain) Julián Alonso (third round)
10. (Morocco) Hicham Arazi (second round)
11. (Belgium) Albert Costa (quarterfinals)
12. (Brazil) Fernando Meligeni (quarterfinals)
13. (Spain) Carlos Costa (second round)
14. (Ecuador) Nicolás Lapentti (quarterfinals)
15. (Argentina) Franco Squillari (semifinals)
16. (Russia) Marat Safin (second round)

== Draw ==
Key

- Q = Qualifier
- WC = Wild card
- LL = Lucky loser
- Alt = Alternate
- ITF = ITF entry
- PR = Protected ranking
- SR = Special ranking
- SE = Special exempt
- JE = Junior exempt
- JR = Junior Accelerator Programme entrant
- CO = College Accelerator Programme entrant
- NG = Next Gen Accelerator Program entrant
- w/o = Walkover
- r = Retired
- d = Defaulted

=== Finals ===
Semifinals
16	(Argentina) Franco Squillari	5	**6**	3
3	**(Spain) Albert Costa**	**7**	1	**6**
6	(Spain) Francisco Clavet	2	**6**	2
7	**(Italy) Andrea Gaudenzi**	**6**	2	**6**

Final
3	**(Spain) Albert Costa**	**6**	1	**6**	3	**6**
7	(Italy) Andrea Gaudenzi	2	**6**	2	**6**	2

=== Top half ===
==== Section 1 ====
First round
**(Australia) W Arthurs**	**6**	6	**6**
(Italy) M Meneschincheri	4	**7**	2
**(Norway) C Ruud**	**6**	**6**
(Spain) Á López Morón	1	4
**(Argentina) L Arnold**	3	**6**	**6**
(Germany) O Gross	**6**	4	3
**(Austria) T Schiessling**	**6**	**6**
(Austria) G Mandl	4	2

Second round
17	(Russia) M Safin	6	4
**(Australia) W Arthurs**	**7**	**6**
(Norway) C Ruud	4	3
16	**(Argentina) F Squillari**	**6**	**6**
9	(Czech Republic) C Doseděl	2	2
**(Argentina) L Arnold**	**6**	**6**
(Austria) T Schiessling	**7**	3	3
8	**(Australia) R Fromberg**	5	**6**	**6**

Third round
(Australia) W Arthurs	6	**7**	4
16	**(Argentina) F Squillari**	**7**	6	**6**
(Argentina) L Arnold	**6**	2	4
8	**(Australia) R Fromberg**	3	**6**	**6**

Quarterfinals
16	**(Argentina) F Squillari**	**6**	4	**6**
8	(Australia) R Fromberg	4	**6**	4

==== Section 2 ====
First round
**(Germany) R Schüttler**	**6**	**7**
(Germany) B Bachert	4	6
**(France) S Huet**	1	**6**	**6**
(Spain) Á Calatrava	**6**	3	4
**(France) S Grosjean**	**6**	**7**
(Australia) P Tramacchi	4	6
**(Slovakia) J Krošlák**	2	**7**	**7**
(Uruguay) M Filippini	**6**	6	6

Second round
(Germany) R Schüttler	1	3
3	**(Spain) A Costa**	**6**	**6**
**(France) S Huet**	4	5
14	(Spain) C Costa	**6**	0^{r}
(France) S Grosjean	**7**	3	3
12	**(Belgium) F Dewulf**	6	**6**	**6**
(Slovakia) J Krošlák	2	**6**	2
5	**(Austria) T Muster**	**6**	4	**6**

Third round
3	**(Spain) A Costa**	**6**	3	**6**
(France) S Huet	4	**6**	3
12	**(Belgium) F Dewulf**	**6**	**6**
5	(Austria) T Muster	2	4

Quarterfinals
3	**(Spain) A Costa**	2	**6**	**6**
12	(Belgium) F Dewulf	**6**	3	4

=== Bottom half ===
==== Section 3 ====
First round
**(Germany) C Vinck**	**6**	**7**
(Germany) M Craca	1	5
**(Austria) M Hipfl**	4	**6**	**7**
(Spain) G Blanco	**6**	3	6
**(Austria) W Schranz**	6	**6**	**6**
(Spain) JA Viloca	**7**	1	1
**(Germany) B Karbacher**	**7**	**6**
(Austria) S Koubek	6	3

Second round
(Germany) C Vinck	3	3
6	**(Spain) F Clavet**	**6**	**6**
**(Austria) M Hipfl**	**6**	**6**
11	(Morocco) H Arazi	2	1
(Austria) W Schranz	4	5
13	**(Brazil) F Meligeni**	**6**	**7**
**(Germany) B Karbacher**	4	**6**	**7**
4	(Spain) A Berasategui	**6**	4	6

Third round
6	**(Spain) F Clavet**	**6**	**6**
(Austria) M Hipfl	4	1
13	**(Brazil) F Meligeni**	**7**	**6**
(Germany) B Karbacher	6	3

Quarterfinals
6	**(Spain) F Clavet**	**6**	**6**
13	(Brazil) F Meligeni	3	1

==== Section 4 ====
First round
**(Germany) L Rehmann**	**6**	**6**
(Argentina) A Schneiter	0	2
**(Germany) H Dreekmann**	**6**	**6**
(Spain) E Benfele Álvarez	4	3
**(Spain) F Vicente**	**6**	**7**
(Germany) M Sinner	1	5
**(Czech Republic) R Vašek**	**7**	1	**6**
(Spain) A Portas	5	**6**	2

Second round
(Germany) L Rehmann	6	2
7	**(Italy) A Gaudenzi**	**7**	**6**
(Germany) H Dreekmann	**6**	2	3
10	**(Spain) J Alonso**	4	**6**	**6**
(Spain) F Vicente	4	1
15	**(Ecuador) N Lapentti**	**6**	**6**
(Czech Republic) R Vašek	**7**	3	6
2	**(Russia) Y Kafelnikov**	6	**6**	**7**

Third round
7	**(Italy) A Gaudenzi**	5	**6**	**6**
10	(Spain) J Alonso	**7**	2	4
15	**(Ecuador) N Lapentti**	**6**	**6**
2	(Russia) Y Kafelnikov	4	1

Quarterfinals
7	**(Italy) A Gaudenzi**	**6**	**7**
15	(Ecuador) N Lapentti	3	6
