= 1996 Bournemouth International – Singles =

Singles
- 1996 Bournemouth International

Final
- Champion: (Spain) Albert Costa
- Runner-up: (Germany) Marc-Kevin Goellner
- Score: 6–7^{(4–7)}, 6–2, 6–2

Details
- Draw: 32
- Seeds: 8

Events
Singles	Doubles
Bournemouth International	· 1997 →

Albert Costa won in the final 6–7^{(4–7)}, 6–2, 6–2 against Marc-Kevin Goellner.

== Seeds ==
A champion seed is indicated in bold text while text in italics indicates the round in which that seed was eliminated.

1. (Spain) **Albert Costa (champion)**
2. (Spain) Félix Mantilla (second round)
3. (Australia) Jason Stoltenberg (semifinals)
4. (Ukraine) Andriy Medvedev (first round)
5. (Spain) Sergi Bruguera (quarterfinals)
6. (United Kingdom) Greg Rusedski (quarterfinals)
7. (Spain) Juan Albert Viloca (second round)
8. (Germany) Marc-Kevin Goellner (final)

== Draw ==
=== Key ===
- Q = Qualifier
- WC = Wild card
- LL = Lucky loser
- Alt = Alternate
- SE = Special exempt
- PR = Protected ranking
- ITF = ITF entry
- JE = Junior exempt
- w/o = Walkover
- r = Retired
- d = Defaulted
- SR = Special ranking

First round
1	(Spain) **A Costa**	**6**	**6**
(Germany) M Geserer	0	3
(Czech Republic) **D Škoch**	**6**	**7**
Q	(South Africa) P Norval	4	5
(Spain) I Truyol	3	4
WC	(United Kingdom) **D Sapsford**	**6**	**6**
(Slovakia) D Hrbatý	**6**	3	4
7	(Spain) **J A Viloca**	0	**6**	**6**
4	(Ukraine) A Medvedev	**7^{7}**	4	2
Q	(Netherlands) **T Kempers**	6^{5}	**6**	**6**
(Spain) A Portas	2	1
(Sweden) **M Norman**	**6**	**6**
(Sweden) **P Fredriksson**	**6**	**6**
WC	(United Kingdom) C Beecher	3	2
(Portugal) N Marques	1	2
5	(Spain) **S Bruguera**	**6**	**6**
6	(United Kingdom) **G Rusedski**	**6**	**6**
LL	(Portugal) B Mota	1	2
(Argentina) **D Orsanic**	**6**	**6**
(Spain) E Benfele Álvarez	4	1
(Argentina) **G Pérez Roldán**	**6**	**6**
WC	(United Kingdom) M Lee	3	2
(France) R Gilbert	2	1
3	(Australia) **J Stoltenberg**	**6**	**6**
8	(Germany) **M-K Goellner**	**7^{8}**	**6**
(France) T Champion	6^{6}	2
Q	(Sweden) **L Jönsson**	**6**	**6**
(Spain) Á López Morón	1	4
Q	(Ukraine) A Rybalko	5	4
(Argentina) **M Zabaleta**	**7**	**6**
(United Kingdom) L Milligan	4	1
2	(Spain) **F Mantilla**	**6**	**6**

Second round
1	(Spain) **A Costa**	**6**	**6**
(Czech Republic) D Škoch	4	1
WC	(United Kingdom) **D Sapsford**	**7**	**7**
7	(Spain) J A Viloca	5	5
Q	(Netherlands) T Kempers	6^{4}	4
(Sweden) **M Norman**	**7^{7}**	**6**
(Sweden) P Fredriksson	4	3
5	(Spain) **S Bruguera**	**6**	**6**
6	(United Kingdom) **G Rusedski**	**6**	**6**
(Argentina) D Orsanic	4	4
(Argentina) G Pérez Roldán	1	2
3	(Australia) **J Stoltenberg**	**6**	**6**
8	(Germany) **M-K Goellner**	6^{5}	**7**	**6**
Q	(Sweden) L Jönsson	**7^{7}**	5	0
(Argentina) **M Zabaleta**	**6**	2	**6**
2	(Spain) F Mantilla	2	**6**	4

Quarterfinals
1	(Spain) **A Costa**	**6**	**6**
WC	(United Kingdom) D Sapsford	1	1
(Sweden) **M Norman**	**7**	1	**7**
5	(Spain) S Bruguera	5	**6**	5
6	(United Kingdom) G Rusedski	**6**	1	3
3	(Australia) **J Stoltenberg**	1	**6**	**6**
8	(Germany) **M-K Goellner**	**6**	**6**
(Argentina) M Zabaleta	4	1

Semifinals
1	(Spain) **A Costa**	4	**6**	**6**
(Sweden) M Norman	**6**	2	3
3	(Australia) J Stoltenberg	**6**	5	4
8	(Germany) **M-K Goellner**	2	**7**	**6**

Final
1	(Spain) **Albert Costa**	6^{4}	**6**	**6**
8	(Germany) Marc-Kevin Goellner	**7^{7}**	2	2
