= 1994 EA Generali Open =

- Date: 1–8 August
- Edition: 24th
- Category: ATP World Series
- Draw: 48S / 24D
- Prize money: $375,000
- Surface: Clay / outdoor
- Location: Kitzbühel, Austria
- Venue: Kitzbüheler Tennisclub

Champions

Singles
- (Croatia) Goran Ivanišević

Doubles
- (South Africa) David Adams / (Russia) Andrei Olhovskiy
← 1993 ·	Austrian Open Kitzbühel	· 1995 →

The 1994 EA Generali Open, also known as the Austrian Open, was a men's tennis tournament held on outdoor clay courts at the Kitzbüheler Tennisclub in Kitzbühel, Austria that was part of the ATP World Series of the 1994 ATP Tour. It was the 24th edition of the tournament and was held from 1 August until 8 August 1994. First-seeded Goran Ivanišević won the singles title.

== Finals ==
=== Singles ===
(Croatia) Goran Ivanišević defeated (France) Fabrice Santoro 6–2, 4–6, 4–6, 6–3, 6–2

- It was Ivanišević 1st singles title of the year and 10th of his career.

=== Doubles ===
(South Africa) David Adams / (Russia) Andrei Olhovskiy defeated (Spain) Sergio Casal / (Spain) Emilio Sánchez 6–7, 6–3, 7–5
