= Roland Burtscher =

Austrian tennis player and coach

- Country (sports): Austria
- Born: 15 June 1969 (age 55); Bludenz, Austria
- Height: 6 ft 0 in (183 cm)
- Plays: Right-handed
- Prize money: $35,498

Singles
- Career record: 2–6
- Highest ranking: No. 315 (8 August 1994)

Grand Slam singles results
- French Open: Q1 (1995)

Doubles
- Highest ranking: No. 557 (1 April 1996)

Roland Burtscher (born 15 June 1969) is an Austrian tennis coach and former professional player.

Burtscher, the Austrian national champion in 1992, began competing on the professional tour that year and reached his career high singles ranking of 315 in 1994.

While competing in qualifiers at the 1994 Lipton Championships, Burtscher had his tennis rackets and shoes stolen from his rental car, which was parked outside a restaurant. He had to borrow a racket from Andreas Maurer, who was coaching Marc-Kevin Goellner at the tournament. With the borrowed racket he was able to make it into the main draw and also won his first round match against Sébastien Lareau. His only other ATP Tour main draw win came later in the season at Kitzbuhel, where he defeated 100 player Diego Nargiso.

From 2003 to 2020 he was employed as a coach by Swiss Tennis. One of his roles was as an assistant coach of Switzerland's Fed Cup team.
