= 1995 ATP Tour =

Men's tennis circuit

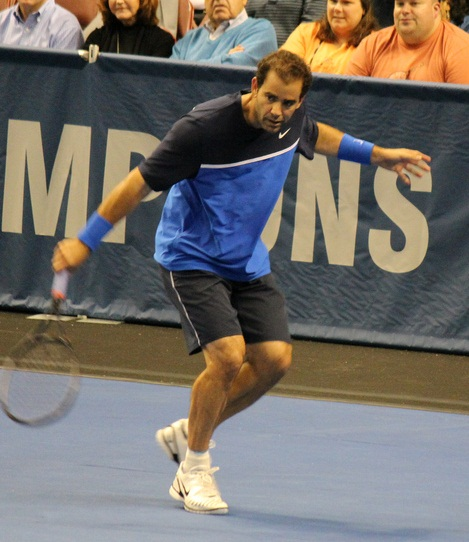
- Pete Sampras finished the year ranked world No. 1 for the third time in his career. He won five titles during the season, including two majors at the Wimbledon Championships and the US Open. He also won two ATP Championship Series, Single Week events.

Details
- Duration: 2 January 1995 – 13 November 1995
- Edition: 6th
- Tournaments: 85
- Categories: Grand Slam (4); ATP Tour World Championships; ATP Championship Series, Single-Week (9); ATP Championship Series (11); ATP World Series (59); Team Events (2)

Achievements (singles)
- Most titles: (Austria) Thomas Muster (12)
- Most finals: (Austria) Thomas Muster (14)
- Prize money leader: (United States) Pete Sampras ($5,393,266)
- Points leader: (United States) Pete Sampras (4842)

Awards
- Player of the year: (United States) Pete Sampras
- Doubles team of the year: (Australia) Todd Woodbridge (Australia) Mark Woodforde
- Most improved player of the year: (Sweden) Thomas Enqvist
- Newcomer of the year: (Australia) Mark Philippoussis
- Comeback player of the year: (United States) Derrick Rostagno

The Association of Tennis Professionals (ATP) Tour is the elite tour for professional tennis organized by the ATP. The ATP Tour includes the Grand Slam tournaments (organized by the International Tennis Federation (ITF)), the ATP Championship Series, Single-Week, the ATP Championship Series, the ATP World Series, the ATP World Team Cup, the Davis Cup (organized by the ITF), the ATP Tour World Championships and the Grand Slam Cup (organized by the ITF).

== Schedule ==
This is the complete schedule of events on the 1995 ATP Tour, with player progression documented from the quarterfinals stage.

Key

Grand Slam
ATP Tour World Championships
ATP Championship Series, Single-Week
ATP Championship Series
ATP World Series
Team Events

=== January ===
Week	Tournament	Champions	Runners-up	Semifinalists	Quarterfinalists
2 Jan	Hopman Cup; Perth, Australia; ITF Mixed Team Championships; Hard (i) – 8 teams (RR)	Germany; 3–0	Ukraine	Czech Republic; France	Italy; Australia; South Africa; Netherlands
2 Jan	Australian Men's Hardcourt Championships; Adelaide, Australia; ATP World Series; Hard – $303,000 – 32S/16D; Singles – Doubles	(United States) Jim Courier; 6–2, 7–5	(France) Arnaud Boetsch	(Australia) Mark Woodforde (Netherlands) Richard Krajicek	(Russia) Yevgeny Kafelnikov (Sweden) Thomas Enqvist (Australia) Patrick Rafter (Germany) Hendrik Dreekmann
2 Jan	Australian Men's Hardcourt Championships; Adelaide, Australia; ATP World Series; Hard – $303,000 – 32S/16D; Singles – Doubles	(United States) Jim Courier (Australia) Patrick Rafter; 7–6, 6–4	(Zimbabwe) Byron Black (Canada) Grant Connell	(Australia) Mark Woodforde (Netherlands) Richard Krajicek	(Russia) Yevgeny Kafelnikov (Sweden) Thomas Enqvist (Australia) Patrick Rafter (Germany) Hendrik Dreekmann
2 Jan	Qatar Open; Doha, Qatar; ATP World Series; Hard – $600,000 – 32S/16D; Singles – Doubles	(Sweden) Stefan Edberg; 7–6^{(7–4)}, 6–1	(Sweden) Magnus Larsson	(France) Henri Leconte (Germany) Michael Stich	(Morocco) Karim Alami (Spain) Javier Sánchez (Germany) Markus Zoecke (Netherlands) Jan Siemerink
2 Jan	Qatar Open; Doha, Qatar; ATP World Series; Hard – $600,000 – 32S/16D; Singles – Doubles	(Sweden) Stefan Edberg (Sweden) Magnus Larsson; 7–6, 6–2	(Russia) Andrei Olhovskiy (Netherlands) Jan Siemerink	(France) Henri Leconte (Germany) Michael Stich	(Morocco) Karim Alami (Spain) Javier Sánchez (Germany) Markus Zoecke (Netherlands) Jan Siemerink
9 Jan	Indonesia Open; Jakarta, Indonesia; ATP World Series; Hard – $303,000 – 32S/16D; Singles – Doubles	(Netherlands) Paul Haarhuis; 7–5, 7–5	(Czech Republic) Radomír Vašek	(Haiti) Ronald Agénor (Denmark) Kenneth Carlsen	(France) Guillaume Raoux (United Kingdom) Mark Petchey (Austria) Gilbert Schaller (Canada) Greg Rusedski
9 Jan	Indonesia Open; Jakarta, Indonesia; ATP World Series; Hard – $303,000 – 32S/16D; Singles – Doubles	(South Africa) David Adams (Russia) Andrei Olhovskiy; 7–5, 6–3	(Haiti) Ronald Agénor (Japan) Shuzo Matsuoka	(Haiti) Ronald Agénor (Denmark) Kenneth Carlsen	(France) Guillaume Raoux (United Kingdom) Mark Petchey (Austria) Gilbert Schaller (Canada) Greg Rusedski
9 Jan	Sydney Outdoors; Sydney, Australia; ATP World Series; Hard – $303,000 – 32S/16D; Singles – Doubles	(United States) Patrick McEnroe; 6–2, 7–6^{(7–4)}	(Australia) Richard Fromberg	(Italy) Renzo Furlan (Italy) Andrea Gaudenzi	(Australia) Mark Woodforde (Australia) Jamie Morgan (Netherlands) Richard Krajicek (Australia) Michael Tebbutt
9 Jan	Sydney Outdoors; Sydney, Australia; ATP World Series; Hard – $303,000 – 32S/16D; Singles – Doubles	(Australia) Todd Woodbridge (Australia) Mark Woodforde; 7–6, 6–4	(United States) Trevor Kronemann (Australia) David Macpherson	(Italy) Renzo Furlan (Italy) Andrea Gaudenzi	(Australia) Mark Woodforde (Australia) Jamie Morgan (Netherlands) Richard Krajicek (Australia) Michael Tebbutt
9 Jan	Benson and Hedges Open; Auckland, New Zealand; ATP World Series; Hard – $303,000 – 32S/16D; Singles – Doubles	(Sweden) Thomas Enqvist; 6–2, 6–1	(United States) Chuck Adams	(United States) Vincent Spadea (Russia) Alexander Volkov	(Netherlands) Jan Siemerink (Switzerland) Jakob Hlasek (New Zealand) Brett Steven (France) Cédric Pioline
9 Jan	Benson and Hedges Open; Auckland, New Zealand; ATP World Series; Hard – $303,000 – 32S/16D; Singles – Doubles	(Canada) Grant Connell (United States) Patrick Galbraith; 6–4, 6–3	(Argentina) Luis Lobo (Spain) Javier Sánchez	(United States) Vincent Spadea (Russia) Alexander Volkov	(Netherlands) Jan Siemerink (Switzerland) Jakob Hlasek (New Zealand) Brett Steven (France) Cédric Pioline
16 Jan; 23 Jan	1995 Australian Open; Melbourne, Australia; Grand Slam; Hard – $2,649,210 – 128S/64D/32X; Singles – Doubles – Mixed doubles	(United States) Andre Agassi; 4–6, 6–1, 7–6^{(8–6)}, 6–4	(United States) Pete Sampras	(United States) Michael Chang (United States) Aaron Krickstein	(United States) Jim Courier (Ukraine) Andrei Medvedev (Netherlands) Jacco Eltingh (Russia) Yevgeny Kafelnikov
16 Jan; 23 Jan	1995 Australian Open; Melbourne, Australia; Grand Slam; Hard – $2,649,210 – 128S/64D/32X; Singles – Doubles – Mixed doubles	(United States) Jared Palmer (United States) Richey Reneberg; 6–3 3–6 6–3 6–2	(The Bahamas) Mark Knowles (Canada) Daniel Nestor	(United States) Michael Chang (United States) Aaron Krickstein	(United States) Jim Courier (Ukraine) Andrei Medvedev (Netherlands) Jacco Eltingh (Russia) Yevgeny Kafelnikov
16 Jan; 23 Jan	1995 Australian Open; Melbourne, Australia; Grand Slam; Hard – $2,649,210 – 128S/64D/32X; Singles – Doubles – Mixed doubles	(United States) Rick Leach (Belarus) Natasha Zvereva; 7–6^{(7–4)}, 6–7^{(3–7)}, 6–4	(Czech Republic) Cyril Suk (United States) Gigi Fernández	(United States) Michael Chang (United States) Aaron Krickstein	(United States) Jim Courier (Ukraine) Andrei Medvedev (Netherlands) Jacco Eltingh (Russia) Yevgeny Kafelnikov
30 Jan	Davis Cup first round St. Petersburg, Florida, US – carpet (i); Naples, Italy – clay Copenhagen, Denmark- Carpet (i); Vienna, Austria- Hard (i); Durban, South Africa – hard Antwerp, Belgium – clay (i); Geneva, Switzerland – clay (i); Karlsruhe, Germany- Hard (i)	First-round winners United States 4-1; Italy 4-1; Sweden 3-2; Austria 4-1; South Africa 3-2; Russia 4-1; Netherlands 4-1; Germany 4-1	First-round losers France; Czech Republic; Denmark; Spain; Australia; Belgium; Switzerland; Croatia		

=== February ===
Week	Tournament	Champions	Runners-up	Semifinalists	Quarterfinalists
6 Feb	Dubai Tennis Championships; Dubai, United Arab Emirates; ATP World Series; Hard – $1,014,250 – 32S/16D; Singles – Doubles	(South Africa) Wayne Ferreira; 6–3, 6–3	(Italy) Andrea Gaudenzi	(Spain) Javier Sánchez (Czech Republic) Petr Korda	(Australia) Todd Woodbridge (Australia) Pat Cash (Germany) Carsten Arriens (Sweden) Henrik Holm
6 Feb	Dubai Tennis Championships; Dubai, United Arab Emirates; ATP World Series; Hard – $1,014,250 – 32S/16D; Singles – Doubles	(Canada) Grant Connell (United States) Patrick Galbraith; 6–2, 4–6, 6–3	(Spain) Tomás Carbonell (Spain) Francisco Roig	(Spain) Javier Sánchez (Czech Republic) Petr Korda	(Australia) Todd Woodbridge (Australia) Pat Cash (Germany) Carsten Arriens (Sweden) Henrik Holm
6 Feb	Open 13; Marseille, France; ATP World Series; Carpet (i) – $514,250 – 32S/16D; Singles – Doubles	(Germany) Boris Becker; 6–7^{(2–7)}, 6–4, 7–5	(Czech Republic) Daniel Vacek	(France) Olivier Delaître (France) Lionel Roux	(Germany) Jörn Renzenbrink (Czech Republic) David Rikl (Slovakia) Karol Kučera (Russia) Yevgeny Kafelnikov
6 Feb	Open 13; Marseille, France; ATP World Series; Carpet (i) – $514,250 – 32S/16D; Singles – Doubles	(South Africa) David Adams (Russia) Andrei Olhovskiy; 6–1, 6–4	(France) Jean-Philippe Fleurian (France) Rodolphe Gilbert	(France) Olivier Delaître (France) Lionel Roux	(Germany) Jörn Renzenbrink (Czech Republic) David Rikl (Slovakia) Karol Kučera (Russia) Yevgeny Kafelnikov
6 Feb	Sybase Open; San Jose, California, US; ATP World Series; Hard (i) – $303,000 – 32S/16D; Singles – Doubles	(United States) Andre Agassi; 6–2, 1–6, 6–3	(United States) Michael Chang	(United States) MaliVai Washington (United States) Jim Courier	(United States) Brian MacPhie (United States) Bryan Shelton (United States) Jim Grabb (Canada) Greg Rusedski
6 Feb	Sybase Open; San Jose, California, US; ATP World Series; Hard (i) – $303,000 – 32S/16D; Singles – Doubles	(United States) Jim Grabb (United States) Patrick McEnroe; 3–6, 7–5, 6–0	(United States) Alex O'Brien (Australia) Sandon Stolle	(United States) MaliVai Washington (United States) Jim Courier	(United States) Brian MacPhie (United States) Bryan Shelton (United States) Jim Grabb (Canada) Greg Rusedski
13 Feb	Kroger St. Jude International; Memphis, Tennessee, US; ATP Championship Series; Hard (i) – $683,000 – 32S/16D; Singles – Doubles	(United States) Todd Martin; 7–6^{(7–2)}, 6–4	(Netherlands) Paul Haarhuis	(United States) Pete Sampras (United States) Jonathan Stark	(Sweden) Thomas Enqvist (Canada) Greg Rusedski (France) Arnaud Boetsch (United States) Michael Chang
13 Feb	Kroger St. Jude International; Memphis, Tennessee, US; ATP Championship Series; Hard (i) – $683,000 – 32S/16D; Singles – Doubles	(United States) Jared Palmer (United States) Richey Reneberg; 7–5 6–3	(United States) Tommy Ho (New Zealand) Brett Steven	(United States) Pete Sampras (United States) Jonathan Stark	(Sweden) Thomas Enqvist (Canada) Greg Rusedski (France) Arnaud Boetsch (United States) Michael Chang
13 Feb	Muratti Time Indoor; Milan, Italy; ATP Championship Series; Carpet (i) – $689,250 – 32S/16D; Singles – Doubles	(Russia) Yevgeny Kafelnikov; 7–5, 5–7, 7–6^{(8–6)}	(Germany) Boris Becker	(Czech Republic) Petr Korda (Croatia) Goran Ivanišević	(France) Guy Forget (Czech Republic) Slava Doseděl (Germany) Michael Stich (France) Olivier Delaître
13 Feb	Muratti Time Indoor; Milan, Italy; ATP Championship Series; Carpet (i) – $689,250 – 32S/16D; Singles – Doubles	(Germany) Boris Becker (France) Guy Forget; 6–2, 6–4	(Czech Republic) Petr Korda (Czech Republic) Karel Nováček	(Czech Republic) Petr Korda (Croatia) Goran Ivanišević	(France) Guy Forget (Czech Republic) Slava Doseděl (Germany) Michael Stich (France) Olivier Delaître
20 Feb	Comcast U.S. Indoor; Philadelphia, Pennsylvania, US; ATP Championship Series; Carpet (i) – $589,250 – 32S/16D; Singles – Doubles	(Sweden) Thomas Enqvist; 0–6, 6–4, 6–0	(United States) Michael Chang	(Netherlands) Paul Haarhuis (United States) Andre Agassi	(New Zealand) Brett Steven (United States) Jonathan Stark (United States) Richey Reneberg (Canada) Sébastien Lareau
20 Feb	Comcast U.S. Indoor; Philadelphia, Pennsylvania, US; ATP Championship Series; Carpet (i) – $589,250 – 32S/16D; Singles – Doubles	(United States) Jim Grabb (United States) Jonathan Stark; 7–6, 6–7, 6–3	(Netherlands) Jacco Eltingh (Netherlands) Paul Haarhuis	(Netherlands) Paul Haarhuis (United States) Andre Agassi	(New Zealand) Brett Steven (United States) Jonathan Stark (United States) Richey Reneberg (Canada) Sébastien Lareau
20 Feb	Eurocard Open; Stuttgart, Germany; ATP Championship Series; Carpet (i) – $2,125,000 – 32S/16D; Singles – Doubles	(Netherlands) Richard Krajicek; 7–6^{(7–4)}, 6–3, 6–7^{(6–8)}, 1–6, 6–3	(Germany) Michael Stich	(Germany) Boris Becker (Czech Republic) Martin Damm	(Russia) Yevgeny Kafelnikov (Russia) Alexander Volkov (Netherlands) Jan Siemerink (Sweden) Magnus Larsson
20 Feb	Eurocard Open; Stuttgart, Germany; ATP Championship Series; Carpet (i) – $2,125,000 – 32S/16D; Singles – Doubles	(Canada) Grant Connell (United States) Patrick Galbraith; 6–2, 6–2	(Czech Republic) Cyril Suk (Czech Republic) Daniel Vacek	(Germany) Boris Becker (Czech Republic) Martin Damm	(Russia) Yevgeny Kafelnikov (Russia) Alexander Volkov (Netherlands) Jan Siemerink (Sweden) Magnus Larsson
27 Feb	ABN AMRO World Tennis Tournament; Rotterdam, The Netherlands; ATP World Series; Carpet (i) – $575,000 – 32S/16D; Singles – Doubles	(Netherlands) Richard Krajicek; 7–6^{(7–5)}, 6–4	(Netherlands) Paul Haarhuis	(Italy) Omar Camporese (Russia) Yevgeny Kafelnikov	(Netherlands) Sjeng Schalken (Ukraine) Andrei Medvedev (United States) Jeff Tarango (Czech Republic) Martin Damm
27 Feb	ABN AMRO World Tennis Tournament; Rotterdam, The Netherlands; ATP World Series; Carpet (i) – $575,000 – 32S/16D; Singles – Doubles	(Czech Republic) Martin Damm (Sweden) Anders Järryd; 6–3, 6–2	(Spain) Tomás Carbonell (Spain) Francisco Roig	(Italy) Omar Camporese (Russia) Yevgeny Kafelnikov	(Netherlands) Sjeng Schalken (Ukraine) Andrei Medvedev (United States) Jeff Tarango (Czech Republic) Martin Damm
27 Feb	Tennis Channel Open; Scottsdale, Arizona, US; ATP World Series; Clay – $303,000 – 32S/16D; Singles – Doubles	(United States) Jim Courier; 7–6^{(7–2)}, 6–4	(Australia) Mark Philippoussis	(United States) Todd Martin (Sweden) Stefan Edberg	(Germany) Carsten Arriens (Sweden) Jonas Björkman (New Zealand) Brett Steven (Australia) Mark Woodforde
27 Feb	Tennis Channel Open; Scottsdale, Arizona, US; ATP World Series; Clay – $303,000 – 32S/16D; Singles – Doubles	(United States) Trevor Kronemann (Australia) David Macpherson; 4–6, 6–3, 6–4	(Argentina) Luis Lobo (Spain) Javier Sánchez	(United States) Todd Martin (Sweden) Stefan Edberg	(Germany) Carsten Arriens (Sweden) Jonas Björkman (New Zealand) Brett Steven (Australia) Mark Woodforde
27 Feb	Abierto Mexicano Telcel; Mexico City, Mexico; ATP World Series; Clay – $305,000 – 32S/16D; Singles – Doubles	(Austria) Thomas Muster; 7–6^{(7–4)}, 7–5	(Brazil) Fernando Meligeni	(Spain) Àlex Corretja (Spain) Francisco Clavet	(United Kingdom) Mark Petchey (Spain) Jordi Burillo (Colombia) Mauricio Hadad (Spain) Oscar Martinez
27 Feb	Abierto Mexicano Telcel; Mexico City, Mexico; ATP World Series; Clay – $305,000 – 32S/16D; Singles – Doubles	(Argentina) Javier Frana (Mexico) Leonardo Lavalle; 7–5, 6–3	(Germany) Marc-Kevin Goellner (Italy) Diego Nargiso	(Spain) Àlex Corretja (Spain) Francisco Clavet	(United Kingdom) Mark Petchey (Spain) Jordi Burillo (Colombia) Mauricio Hadad (Spain) Oscar Martinez

=== March ===
Week	Tournament	Champions	Runners-up	Semifinalists	Quarterfinalists
6 Mar	Newsweek Champions Cup; Indian Wells, California, US; ATP Championship Series, Single-Week; Hard – $1,550,000 – 56S/28D; Singles – Doubles	(United States) Pete Sampras; 7–5, 6–3, 7–5	(United States) Andre Agassi	(Sweden) Stefan Edberg (Germany) Boris Becker	(United States) Todd Martin (Austria) Thomas Muster (Sweden) Magnus Larsson (South Africa) Wayne Ferreira
6 Mar	Newsweek Champions Cup; Indian Wells, California, US; ATP Championship Series, Single-Week; Hard – $1,550,000 – 56S/28D; Singles – Doubles	(United States) Tommy Ho (New Zealand) Brett Steven; 7–6, 6–7, 6–4	(South Africa) Gary Muller (South Africa) Piet Norval	(Sweden) Stefan Edberg (Germany) Boris Becker	(United States) Todd Martin (Austria) Thomas Muster (Sweden) Magnus Larsson (South Africa) Wayne Ferreira
6 Mar	Copenhagen Open; Copenhagen, Denmark; ATP World Series; Carpet (i) – $203,000 – 32S/16D; Singles – Doubles	(Germany) Martin Sinner; 6–7^{(3–7)}, 7–6^{(10–8)}, 6–3	(Russia) Andrei Olhovskiy	(Slovakia) Karol Kučera (Sweden) Anders Järryd	(United Kingdom) Jeremy Bates (Netherlands) Jan Siemerink (Australia) Pat Cash (Denmark) Frederik Fetterlein
6 Mar	Copenhagen Open; Copenhagen, Denmark; ATP World Series; Carpet (i) – $203,000 – 32S/16D; Singles – Doubles	(United States) Mark Keil (Sweden) Peter Nyborg; 6–7, 6–4, 7–6	(France) Guillaume Raoux (Canada) Greg Rusedski	(Slovakia) Karol Kučera (Sweden) Anders Järryd	(United Kingdom) Jeremy Bates (Netherlands) Jan Siemerink (Australia) Pat Cash (Denmark) Frederik Fetterlein
13 Mar	St. Petersburg Open; Saint Petersburg, Russia; ATP World Series; Carpet (i) – $300,000 – 32S/16D; Singles – Doubles	(Russia) Yevgeny Kafelnikov; 6–2, 6–2	(France) Guillaume Raoux	(Russia) Alexander Volkov (Russia) Andrei Chesnokov	(Switzerland) Jakob Hlasek (Canada) Sébastien Lareau (Germany) Nicolas Kiefer (United States) T. J. Middleton
13 Mar	St. Petersburg Open; Saint Petersburg, Russia; ATP World Series; Carpet (i) – $300,000 – 32S/16D; Singles – Doubles	(Czech Republic) Martin Damm (Sweden) Anders Järryd; 6–4, 6–2	(Switzerland) Jakob Hlasek (Russia) Yevgeny Kafelnikov	(Russia) Alexander Volkov (Russia) Andrei Chesnokov	(Switzerland) Jakob Hlasek (Canada) Sébastien Lareau (Germany) Nicolas Kiefer (United States) T. J. Middleton
13 Mar; 20 Mar	Miami Masters; Key Biscayne, Florida, US; ATP Championship Series, Single-Week; Hard – $2,250,000 – 96S/48D; Singles – Doubles	(United States) Andre Agassi; 3–6, 6–2, 7–6^{(7–3)}	(United States) Pete Sampras	(Sweden) Jonas Björkman (Sweden) Magnus Larsson	(Ukraine) Andrei Medvedev (Sweden) Mats Wilander (Peru) Jaime Yzaga (South Africa) Wayne Ferreira
13 Mar; 20 Mar	Miami Masters; Key Biscayne, Florida, US; ATP Championship Series, Single-Week; Hard – $2,250,000 – 96S/48D; Singles – Doubles	(Australia) Todd Woodbridge (Australia) Mark Woodforde; 6–3, 7–6	(United States) Jim Grabb (United States) Patrick McEnroe	(Sweden) Jonas Björkman (Sweden) Magnus Larsson	(Ukraine) Andrei Medvedev (Sweden) Mats Wilander (Peru) Jaime Yzaga (South Africa) Wayne Ferreira
20 Mar	Grand Prix Hassan II; Casablanca, Morocco; ATP World Series; Clay – $203,000 – 32S/16D; Singles – Doubles	(Austria) Gilbert Schaller; 6–4, 6–2	(Spain) Albert Costa	(Netherlands) Sjeng Schalken (Spain) Álex López Morón	(Spain) Félix Mantilla (Spain) Tomás Carbonell (Italy) Stefano Pescosolido (Germany) Marc-Kevin Goellner
20 Mar	Grand Prix Hassan II; Casablanca, Morocco; ATP World Series; Clay – $203,000 – 32S/16D; Singles – Doubles	(Spain) Tomás Carbonell (Spain) Francisco Roig; 6–4, 6–1	(Portugal) Emanuel Couto (Portugal) João Cunha-Silva	(Netherlands) Sjeng Schalken (Spain) Álex López Morón	(Spain) Félix Mantilla (Spain) Tomás Carbonell (Italy) Stefano Pescosolido (Germany) Marc-Kevin Goellner
27 Mar	Davis Cup Quarterfinals; Palermo, Italy – clay Växjö, Sweden – carpet (i); Moscow, Russia – carpet (i); Utrecht, Netherlands – hard (i)	Quarterfinal winners United States 5-0; Sweden 5-0; Russia 4-1; Germany 4-1	Quarterfinal losers Italy; Austria; South Africa; Netherlands		

=== April ===
Week	Tournament	Champions	Runners-up	Semifinalists	Quarterfinalists
3 Apr	Estoril Open; Oeiras, Portugal; ATP World Series; Clay – $550,000 – 32S/16D; Singles – Doubles	(Austria) Thomas Muster; 6–4, 6–2	(Spain) Albert Costa	(Spain) Emilio Sánchez (France) Fabrice Santoro	(Portugal) Nuno Marques (Spain) Javier Sánchez (Austria) Gilbert Schaller (Ukraine) Andrei Medvedev
3 Apr	Estoril Open; Oeiras, Portugal; ATP World Series; Clay – $550,000 – 32S/16D; Singles – Doubles	(Russia) Yevgeny Kafelnikov (Russia) Andrei Olhovskiy; 5–7, 7–5, 6–2	(Germany) Marc-Kevin Goellner (Italy) Diego Nargiso	(Spain) Emilio Sánchez (France) Fabrice Santoro	(Portugal) Nuno Marques (Spain) Javier Sánchez (Austria) Gilbert Schaller (Ukraine) Andrei Medvedev
3 Apr	South African Open; Johannesburg, South Africa; ATP World Series; Hard – $303,000 – 32S/16D	(Germany) Martin Sinner; 6–1, 6–4	(France) Guillaume Raoux	(Zimbabwe) Byron Black (United Kingdom) Jeremy Bates	(France) Lionel Roux (Germany) Patrick Baur (Germany) Jörn Renzenbrink (South Africa) Neville Godwin
3 Apr	South African Open; Johannesburg, South Africa; ATP World Series; Hard – $303,000 – 32S/16D	(France) Rodolphe Gilbert (France) Guillaume Raoux; 6–4, 3–6, 6–3	(Germany) Martin Sinner (Netherlands) Joost Winnink	(Zimbabwe) Byron Black (United Kingdom) Jeremy Bates	(France) Lionel Roux (Germany) Patrick Baur (Germany) Jörn Renzenbrink (South Africa) Neville Godwin
10 Apr	Torneo Godó; Barcelona, Spain; ATP Championship Series; Clay – $775,000 – 56S/28D; Singles – Doubles	(Austria) Thomas Muster; 6–2, 6–1, 6–4	(Sweden) Magnus Larsson	(Russia) Yevgeny Kafelnikov (Croatia) Goran Ivanišević	(Spain) Carlos Costa (France) Thierry Champion (Spain) Alberto Berasategui (Spain) Jordi Arrese
10 Apr	Torneo Godó; Barcelona, Spain; ATP Championship Series; Clay – $775,000 – 56S/28D; Singles – Doubles	(United States) Trevor Kronemann (Australia) David Macpherson; 6–2, 6–4	(Italy) Andrea Gaudenzi (Croatia) Goran Ivanišević	(Russia) Yevgeny Kafelnikov (Croatia) Goran Ivanišević	(Spain) Carlos Costa (France) Thierry Champion (Spain) Alberto Berasategui (Spain) Jordi Arrese
10 Apr	Japan Open Tennis Championships; Tokyo, Japan; ATP Championship Series; Hard – $935,000 – 56S/28D; Singles – Doubles	(United States) Jim Courier; 6–4, 6–3	(United States) Andre Agassi	(South Africa) Wayne Ferreira (United States) Michael Chang	(Australia) Scott Draper (Sweden) Jonas Björkman (Sweden) Thomas Enqvist (Sweden) Jan Apell
10 Apr	Japan Open Tennis Championships; Tokyo, Japan; ATP Championship Series; Hard – $935,000 – 56S/28D; Singles – Doubles	(The Bahamas) Mark Knowles (United States) Jonathan Stark; 6-3, 3-6, 7-6	(Australia) John Fitzgerald (Sweden) Anders Järryd	(South Africa) Wayne Ferreira (United States) Michael Chang	(Australia) Scott Draper (Sweden) Jonas Björkman (Sweden) Thomas Enqvist (Sweden) Jan Apell
17 Apr	Salem Open; Hong Kong; ATP World Series; Hard – $303,000 – 32S/16D; Singles – Doubles	(United States) Michael Chang; 6–3, 6–1	(Sweden) Jonas Björkman	(United States) Jim Courier (Sweden) Jan Apell	(Denmark) Kenneth Carlsen (Russia) Alexander Volkov (Sweden) Thomas Enqvist (South Africa) Wayne Ferreira
17 Apr	Salem Open; Hong Kong; ATP World Series; Hard – $303,000 – 32S/16D; Singles – Doubles	(United States) Tommy Ho (Australia) Mark Philippoussis; 6–1, 6–7, 7–6	(Australia) John Fitzgerald (Sweden) Anders Järryd	(United States) Jim Courier (Sweden) Jan Apell	(Denmark) Kenneth Carlsen (Russia) Alexander Volkov (Sweden) Thomas Enqvist (South Africa) Wayne Ferreira
17 Apr	Philips Open; Nice, France; ATP World Series; Clay – $303,000 – 32S/16D; Singles – Doubles	(Switzerland) Marc Rosset; 6–4, 6–0	(Russia) Yevgeny Kafelnikov	(Ukraine) Andrei Medvedev (Spain) Albert Costa	(France) Cédric Pioline (Australia) Richard Fromberg (Australia) Mark Woodforde (Spain) Tomás Carbonell
17 Apr	Philips Open; Nice, France; ATP World Series; Clay – $303,000 – 32S/16D; Singles – Doubles	(Czech Republic) Cyril Suk (Czech Republic) Daniel Vacek; 3–6, 7–6, 7–6	(United States) Luke Jensen (United States) David Wheaton	(Ukraine) Andrei Medvedev (Spain) Albert Costa	(France) Cédric Pioline (Australia) Richard Fromberg (Australia) Mark Woodforde (Spain) Tomás Carbonell
17 Apr	XL Bermuda Open; Bermuda, Bermuda; ATP World Series; Clay – $303,000 – 32S/16D; Singles – Doubles	(Colombia) Mauricio Hadad; 7–6^{(7–5)}, 3–6, 6–4	(Argentina) Javier Frana	(United States) Bryan Shelton (United States) Vincent Spadea	(Australia) Michael Tebbutt (Australia) Jamie Morgan (Germany) Karsten Braasch (Australia) Jason Stoltenberg
17 Apr	XL Bermuda Open; Bermuda, Bermuda; ATP World Series; Clay – $303,000 – 32S/16D; Singles – Doubles	(Canada) Grant Connell (United States) Todd Martin; 7–6, 2–6, 7–5	(New Zealand) Brett Steven (Australia) Jason Stoltenberg	(United States) Bryan Shelton (United States) Vincent Spadea	(Australia) Michael Tebbutt (Australia) Jamie Morgan (Germany) Karsten Braasch (Australia) Jason Stoltenberg
24 Apr	Monte Carlo Masters; Roquebrune-Cap-Martin, France; ATP Championship Series, Single-Week; Clay – $1,545,000 – 56S/28D; Singles – Doubles	(Austria) Thomas Muster; 4–6, 5–7, 6–1, 7–6^{(8–6)}, 6–0	(Germany) Boris Becker	(Italy) Andrea Gaudenzi (Croatia) Goran Ivanišević	(United States) David Wheaton (Spain) Sergi Bruguera (Austria) Gilbert Schaller (Netherlands) Richard Krajicek
24 Apr	Monte Carlo Masters; Roquebrune-Cap-Martin, France; ATP Championship Series, Single-Week; Clay – $1,545,000 – 56S/28D; Singles – Doubles	(Netherlands) Jacco Eltingh (Netherlands) Paul Haarhuis; 6–3, 6–4	(Argentina) Luis Lobo (Spain) Javier Sánchez	(Italy) Andrea Gaudenzi (Croatia) Goran Ivanišević	(United States) David Wheaton (Spain) Sergi Bruguera (Austria) Gilbert Schaller (Netherlands) Richard Krajicek
24 Apr	Seoul Open; Seoul, South Korea; ATP World Series; Hard – $203,000 – 32S/16D; Singles – Doubles	(Canada) Greg Rusedski; 6–4, 3–1, ret	(Germany) Lars Rehmann	(Denmark) Kenneth Carlsen (China) Bing Pan	(Russia) Alexander Volkov (United States) Tommy Ho (Germany) Alexander Mronz (Kenya) Paul Wekesa
24 Apr	Seoul Open; Seoul, South Korea; ATP World Series; Hard – $203,000 – 32S/16D; Singles – Doubles	(Canada) Sébastien Lareau (United States) Jeff Tarango; 6–3, 6–2	(Australia) Joshua Eagle (Australia) Andrew Florent	(Denmark) Kenneth Carlsen (China) Bing Pan	(Russia) Alexander Volkov (United States) Tommy Ho (Germany) Alexander Mronz (Kenya) Paul Wekesa

=== May ===
Week	Tournament	Champions	Runners-up	Semifinalists	Quarterfinalists
1 May	BMW Open; Munich, Germany; ATP World Series; Clay – $400,000 – 32S/16D; Singles – Doubles	(South Africa) Wayne Ferreira; 7–5, 7–6^{(8–6)}	(Germany) Michael Stich	(Uruguay) Marcelo Filippini (Spain) Àlex Corretja	(Austria) Gilbert Schaller (Sweden) Stefan Edberg (Germany) Oliver Gross (Netherlands) Sjeng Schalken
1 May	BMW Open; Munich, Germany; ATP World Series; Clay – $400,000 – 32S/16D; Singles – Doubles	(United States) Trevor Kronemann (Australia) David Macpherson; 6–3, 6–4	(Argentina) Luis Lobo (Spain) Javier Sánchez	(Uruguay) Marcelo Filippini (Spain) Àlex Corretja	(Austria) Gilbert Schaller (Sweden) Stefan Edberg (Germany) Oliver Gross (Netherlands) Sjeng Schalken
1 May	AT&T Challenge; Atlanta, GA, US; ATP World Series; Clay – $303,000 – 32S/16D; Singles – Doubles	(United States) Michael Chang; 6–2, 6–7^{(6–8)}, 6–4	(United States) Andre Agassi	(Sweden) Magnus Larsson (United States) Todd Martin	(Norway) Christian Ruud (Sweden) Mats Wilander (New Zealand) Brett Steven (Spain) Jordi Arrese
1 May	AT&T Challenge; Atlanta, GA, US; ATP World Series; Clay – $303,000 – 32S/16D; Singles – Doubles	(Spain) Sergio Casal (Spain) Emilio Sánchez; 6–7, 6–3, 7–6	(United States) Jared Palmer (United States) Richey Reneberg	(Sweden) Magnus Larsson (United States) Todd Martin	(Norway) Christian Ruud (Sweden) Mats Wilander (New Zealand) Brett Steven (Spain) Jordi Arrese
8 May	ATP German Open; Hamburg Masters, Germany; ATP Championship Series, Single-Week; Clay – $1,545,000 – 56S/28D; Singles – Doubles	(Ukraine) Andrei Medvedev; 6–3, 6–2, 6–1	(Croatia) Goran Ivanišević	(Spain) Sergi Bruguera (United States) Pete Sampras	(United States) Andre Agassi (Switzerland) Marc Rosset (Italy) Andrea Gaudenzi (South Africa) Wayne Ferreira
8 May	ATP German Open; Hamburg Masters, Germany; ATP Championship Series, Single-Week; Clay – $1,545,000 – 56S/28D; Singles – Doubles	(South Africa) Wayne Ferreira (Russia) Yevgeny Kafelnikov; 6–1, 7–6	(Zimbabwe) Byron Black (Russia) Andrei Olhovskiy	(Spain) Sergi Bruguera (United States) Pete Sampras	(United States) Andre Agassi (Switzerland) Marc Rosset (Italy) Andrea Gaudenzi (South Africa) Wayne Ferreira
8 May	U.S. Men's Clay Court Championships; Pinehurst, North Carolina, US; ATP World Series; Clay – $264,250 – 32S/16D; Singles – Doubles	(Sweden) Thomas Enqvist; 6–3, 3–6, 6–3	(Argentina) Javier Frana	(Sweden) Magnus Larsson (United States) David Wheaton	(United States) Jared Palmer (Switzerland) Jakob Hlasek (Spain) Jordi Arrese (Brazil) Fernando Meligeni
8 May	U.S. Men's Clay Court Championships; Pinehurst, North Carolina, US; ATP World Series; Clay – $264,250 – 32S/16D; Singles – Doubles	(Australia) Todd Woodbridge (Australia) Mark Woodforde; 6–2, 6–4	(United States) Alex O'Brien (Australia) Sandon Stolle	(Sweden) Magnus Larsson (United States) David Wheaton	(United States) Jared Palmer (Switzerland) Jakob Hlasek (Spain) Jordi Arrese (Brazil) Fernando Meligeni
15 May	Italian Open; Rome Masters, Italy; ATP Championship Series, Single-Week; Clay – $1,750,000 – 64S/32D; Singles – Doubles	(Austria) Thomas Muster; 3–6, 7–6^{(7–5)}, 6–2, 6–3	(Spain) Sergi Bruguera	(Croatia) Goran Ivanišević (South Africa) Wayne Ferreira	(Sweden) Jonas Björkman (United States) Jeff Tarango (Sweden) Stefan Edberg (United States) Michael Chang
15 May	Italian Open; Rome Masters, Italy; ATP Championship Series, Single-Week; Clay – $1,750,000 – 64S/32D; Singles – Doubles	(Czech Republic) Cyril Suk (Czech Republic) Daniel Vacek; 6–3, 6–4	(Sweden) Jan Apell (Sweden) Jonas Björkman	(Croatia) Goran Ivanišević (South Africa) Wayne Ferreira	(Sweden) Jonas Björkman (United States) Jeff Tarango (Sweden) Stefan Edberg (United States) Michael Chang
15 May	International Tennis Championships; Coral Springs, FL, US; ATP World Series; Clay – $230,000 – 32S/16D; Singles – Doubles	(Australia) Todd Woodbridge; 6–4, 6–2	(United Kingdom) Greg Rusedski	(Argentina) Javier Frana (Australia) Mark Woodforde	(Venezuela) Nicolás Pereira (Argentina) Hernán Gumy (New Zealand) Brett Steven (Sweden) Thomas Enqvist
15 May	International Tennis Championships; Coral Springs, FL, US; ATP World Series; Clay – $230,000 – 32S/16D; Singles – Doubles	(Australia) Todd Woodbridge (Australia) Mark Woodforde; 6–3, 6–1	(Spain) Sergio Casal (Spain) Emilio Sánchez	(Argentina) Javier Frana (Australia) Mark Woodforde	(Venezuela) Nicolás Pereira (Argentina) Hernán Gumy (New Zealand) Brett Steven (Sweden) Thomas Enqvist
22 May	World Team Cup; Düsseldorf, Germany $1,550,000 – clay	(Sweden) Sweden; 2-1	Croatia		
22 May	Internazionali di Carisbo; Bologna, Italy; ATP World Series; Clay – $303,000 – 32S/16D; Singles – Doubles	(Chile) Marcelo Ríos; 6–2, 6–4	(Uruguay) Marcelo Filippini	(Australia) Mark Philippoussis (Spain) Javier Sánchez	(Austria) Gilbert Schaller (Morocco) Karim Alami (Spain) Jordi Burillo (Czech Republic) Slava Doseděl
22 May	Internazionali di Carisbo; Bologna, Italy; ATP World Series; Clay – $303,000 – 32S/16D; Singles – Doubles	(Zimbabwe) Byron Black (United States) Jonathan Stark; 7–5, 6–3	(Belgium) Libor Pimek (United States) Vincent Spadea	(Australia) Mark Philippoussis (Spain) Javier Sánchez	(Austria) Gilbert Schaller (Morocco) Karim Alami (Spain) Jordi Burillo (Czech Republic) Slava Doseděl
29 May; 5 Jun	French Open; Paris, France; Grand Slam; Clay – $4,941,266 – 128S/64D/48X; Singles – Doubles – Mixed doubles	(Austria) Thomas Muster; 7–5, 6–2, 6–4	(United States) Michael Chang	(Russia) Yevgeny Kafelnikov (Spain) Sergi Bruguera	(United States) Andre Agassi (Spain) Albert Costa (Romania) Adrian Voinea (Italy) Renzo Furlan
29 May; 5 Jun	French Open; Paris, France; Grand Slam; Clay – $4,941,266 – 128S/64D/48X; Singles – Doubles – Mixed doubles	(Netherlands) Jacco Eltingh (Netherlands) Paul Haarhuis; 6–7, 6–4, 6–1	(Sweden) Nicklas Kulti (Sweden) Magnus Larsson	(Russia) Yevgeny Kafelnikov (Spain) Sergi Bruguera	(United States) Andre Agassi (Spain) Albert Costa (Romania) Adrian Voinea (Italy) Renzo Furlan
29 May; 5 Jun	French Open; Paris, France; Grand Slam; Clay – $4,941,266 – 128S/64D/48X; Singles – Doubles – Mixed doubles	(Australia) Todd Woodbridge (Latvia) Larisa Savchenko-Neiland; 7–6^{(10–8)}, 7–6^{(7–4)}	(South Africa) John-Laffnie de Jager (Canada) Jill Hetherington	(Russia) Yevgeny Kafelnikov (Spain) Sergi Bruguera	(United States) Andre Agassi (Spain) Albert Costa (Romania) Adrian Voinea (Italy) Renzo Furlan

=== June ===
Week	Tournament	Champions	Runners-up	Semifinalists	Quarterfinalists
12 Jun	Ordina Open; Rosmalen, The Netherlands; ATP World Series; Grass – $303,000 – 32S/16D; Singles – Doubles	(Slovakia) Karol Kučera; 7–6^{(9–7)}, 7–6^{(7–4)}	(Sweden) Anders Järryd	(New Zealand) Brett Steven (Sweden) Henrik Holm	(Netherlands) Richard Krajicek (United States) Richey Reneberg (Netherlands) Paul Haarhuis (Italy) Diego Nargiso
12 Jun	Ordina Open; Rosmalen, The Netherlands; ATP World Series; Grass – $303,000 – 32S/16D; Singles – Doubles	(Netherlands) Richard Krajicek (Netherlands) Jan Siemerink; 7–5, 6–3	(Netherlands) Hendrik Jan Davids (Russia) Andrei Olhovskiy	(New Zealand) Brett Steven (Sweden) Henrik Holm	(Netherlands) Richard Krajicek (United States) Richey Reneberg (Netherlands) Paul Haarhuis (Italy) Diego Nargiso
12 Jun	Oporto Open; Maia, Portugal; ATP World Series; Clay – $303,000 – 32S/16D; Singles – Doubles	(Spain) Alberto Berasategui; 3–6, 6–3, 6–4	(Spain) Carlos Costa	(Spain) Francisco Clavet (Argentina) Hernán Gumy	(Belgium) Filip Dewulf (Australia) Richard Fromberg (Germany) Carsten Arriens (Spain) Jordi Arrese
12 Jun	Oporto Open; Maia, Portugal; ATP World Series; Clay – $303,000 – 32S/16D; Singles – Doubles	(Spain) Tomás Carbonell (Spain) Francisco Roig; 6–3, 7–6	(Spain) Jordi Arrese (Spain) Àlex Corretja	(Spain) Francisco Clavet (Argentina) Hernán Gumy	(Belgium) Filip Dewulf (Australia) Richard Fromberg (Germany) Carsten Arriens (Spain) Jordi Arrese
12 Jun	Queen's Club Championships; London, Great Britain; ATP World Series; Grass – $600,000 – 56S/28D; Singles – Doubles	(United States) Pete Sampras; 7–6^{(7–3)}, 7–6^{(8–6)}	(France) Guy Forget	(Germany) Marc-Kevin Goellner (Germany) Boris Becker	(Australia) Sandon Stolle (United States) Derrick Rostagno (Croatia) Goran Ivanišević (Australia) Jason Stoltenberg
12 Jun	Queen's Club Championships; London, Great Britain; ATP World Series; Grass – $600,000 – 56S/28D; Singles – Doubles	(United States) Todd Martin (United States) Pete Sampras; 7–6, 6–4	(Sweden) Jan Apell (Sweden) Jonas Björkman	(Germany) Marc-Kevin Goellner (Germany) Boris Becker	(Australia) Sandon Stolle (United States) Derrick Rostagno (Croatia) Goran Ivanišević (Australia) Jason Stoltenberg
19 Jun	Hypo Group Tennis International; St. Poelten, Austria; ATP World Series; Clay – $350,000 – 32S/16D; Singles – Doubles	(Austria) Thomas Muster; 6–3, 3–6, 6–1	(Czech Republic) Bohdan Ulihrach	(Italy) Stefano Pescosolido (Czech Republic) Slava Doseděl	(France) Rodolphe Gilbert (Austria) Gilbert Schaller (Spain) Carlos Moyá (Spain) Jordi Burillo
19 Jun	Hypo Group Tennis International; St. Poelten, Austria; ATP World Series; Clay – $350,000 – 32S/16D; Singles – Doubles	(United States) Bill Behrens (United States) Matt Lucena; 7–5, 6–4	(Belgium) Libor Pimek (South Africa) Byron Talbot	(Italy) Stefano Pescosolido (Czech Republic) Slava Doseděl	(France) Rodolphe Gilbert (Austria) Gilbert Schaller (Spain) Carlos Moyá (Spain) Jordi Burillo
19 Jun	Gerry Weber Open; Halle, Germany; ATP World Series; Grass – $700,000 – 32S/16D; Singles – Doubles	(Switzerland) Marc Rosset; 3–6, 7–6^{(13–11)}, 7–6^{(10–8)}	(Germany) Michael Stich	(Netherlands) Paul Haarhuis (Netherlands) Jacco Eltingh	(Russia) Yevgeny Kafelnikov (United States) Richey Reneberg (United States) Jimmy Connors (New Zealand) Brett Steven
19 Jun	Gerry Weber Open; Halle, Germany; ATP World Series; Grass – $700,000 – 32S/16D; Singles – Doubles	(Netherlands) Jacco Eltingh (Netherlands) Paul Haarhuis; 6–2, 3–6, 6–3	(Russia) Yevgeny Kafelnikov (Russia) Andrei Olhovskiy	(Netherlands) Paul Haarhuis (Netherlands) Jacco Eltingh	(Russia) Yevgeny Kafelnikov (United States) Richey Reneberg (United States) Jimmy Connors (New Zealand) Brett Steven
19 Jun	Nottingham Open; Nottingham, Great Britain; ATP World Series; Grass – $303,000 – 32S/16D; Singles – Doubles	(Argentina) Javier Frana; 7–6^{(7–4)}, 6–3	(Australia) Todd Woodbridge	(Zimbabwe) Byron Black (Australia) Mark Woodforde	(United States) Tommy Ho (Russia) Alexander Volkov (Japan) Shuzo Matsuoka (United Kingdom) Tim Henman
19 Jun	Nottingham Open; Nottingham, Great Britain; ATP World Series; Grass – $303,000 – 32S/16D; Singles – Doubles	(United States) Luke Jensen (United States) Murphy Jensen; 6–2, 6–4	(United States) Patrick Galbraith (South Africa) Danie Visser	(Zimbabwe) Byron Black (Australia) Mark Woodforde	(United States) Tommy Ho (Russia) Alexander Volkov (Japan) Shuzo Matsuoka (United Kingdom) Tim Henman
26 Jun; 3 Jul	Wimbledon Championships; London, Great Britain; Grand Slam; Grass – $2,837,830 – 128S/64D/64X; Singles – Doubles – Mixed doubles	(United States) Pete Sampras; 6–7^{(5–7)}, 6–2, 6–4, 6–2	(Germany) Boris Becker	(United States) Andre Agassi (Croatia) Goran Ivanišević	(Netherlands) Jacco Eltingh (France) Cédric Pioline (Russia) Yevgeny Kafelnikov (Japan) Shuzo Matsuoka
26 Jun; 3 Jul	Wimbledon Championships; London, Great Britain; Grand Slam; Grass – $2,837,830 – 128S/64D/64X; Singles – Doubles – Mixed doubles	(Australia) Todd Woodbridge (Australia) Mark Woodforde; 7–5, 7–6, 7–6	(United States) Rick Leach (United States) Scott Melville	(United States) Andre Agassi (Croatia) Goran Ivanišević	(Netherlands) Jacco Eltingh (France) Cédric Pioline (Russia) Yevgeny Kafelnikov (Japan) Shuzo Matsuoka
26 Jun; 3 Jul	Wimbledon Championships; London, Great Britain; Grand Slam; Grass – $2,837,830 – 128S/64D/64X; Singles – Doubles – Mixed doubles	(United States) Jonathan Stark (United States) Martina Navratilova; 6–4, 6–4	(Czech Republic) Cyril Suk (United States) Gigi Fernández	(United States) Andre Agassi (Croatia) Goran Ivanišević	(Netherlands) Jacco Eltingh (France) Cédric Pioline (Russia) Yevgeny Kafelnikov (Japan) Shuzo Matsuoka

=== July ===
Week	Tournament	Champions	Runners-up	Semifinalists	Quarterfinalists
10 Jul	Rado Swiss Open; Gstaad, Switzerland; ATP World Series; Clay – $525,000 – 32S/16D	(Russia) Yevgeny Kafelnikov; 6–3, 6–4, 3–6, 6–3	(Switzerland) Jakob Hlasek	(Switzerland) Marc Rosset (Spain) Sergi Bruguera	(Chile) Marcelo Ríos (France) Arnaud Boetsch (Spain) Javier Sánchez (Italy) Andrea Gaudenzi
10 Jul	Rado Swiss Open; Gstaad, Switzerland; ATP World Series; Clay – $525,000 – 32S/16D	(Argentina) Luis Lobo (Spain) Javier Sánchez; 6–7, 7–6, 7–6	(France) Arnaud Boetsch (Switzerland) Marc Rosset	(Switzerland) Marc Rosset (Spain) Sergi Bruguera	(Chile) Marcelo Ríos (France) Arnaud Boetsch (Spain) Javier Sánchez (Italy) Andrea Gaudenzi
10 Jul	Hall of Fame Tennis Championships; Newport, Rhode Island, US; ATP World Series; Grass – $230,000 – 32S/16D	(Germany) David Prinosil; 7–6^{(7–3)}, 5–7, 6–2	(United States) David Wheaton	(Zimbabwe) Byron Black (United States) Derrick Rostagno	(Italy) Laurence Tieleman (United Kingdom) Chris Wilkinson (Australia) Todd Woodbridge (South Africa) Marcos Ondruska
10 Jul	Hall of Fame Tennis Championships; Newport, Rhode Island, US; ATP World Series; Grass – $230,000 – 32S/16D	(Germany) Jörn Renzenbrink (Germany) Markus Zoecke; 6–1, 6–2	(Australia) Paul Kilderry (Portugal) Nuno Marques	(Zimbabwe) Byron Black (United States) Derrick Rostagno	(Italy) Laurence Tieleman (United Kingdom) Chris Wilkinson (Australia) Todd Woodbridge (South Africa) Marcos Ondruska
10 Jul	Swedish Open; Båstad, Sweden; ATP World Series; Clay – $303,000 – 32S/16D; Singles – Doubles	(Brazil) Fernando Meligeni; 6–4, 6–4	(Norway) Christian Ruud	(Belgium) Kris Goossens (Spain) Carlos Costa	(Germany) Marc-Kevin Goellner (Denmark) Frederik Fetterlein (Spain) Tomás Carbonell (Sweden) Magnus Norman
10 Jul	Swedish Open; Båstad, Sweden; ATP World Series; Clay – $303,000 – 32S/16D; Singles – Doubles	(Sweden) Jan Apell (Sweden) Jonas Björkman; 6–3, 6–0	(Australia) Jon Ireland (Australia) Andrew Kratzmann	(Belgium) Kris Goossens (Spain) Carlos Costa	(Germany) Marc-Kevin Goellner (Denmark) Frederik Fetterlein (Spain) Tomás Carbonell (Sweden) Magnus Norman
17 Jul	Mercedes Cup; Stuttgart, Germany; ATP Championship Series; Clay – $915,000 – 48S/24D; Singles – Doubles	(Austria) Thomas Muster; 6–2, 6–2	(Sweden) Jan Apell	(Spain) Sergi Bruguera (France) Arnaud Boetsch	(Spain) Tomás Carbonell (Germany) Carl-Uwe Steeb (Spain) Albert Costa (Sweden) Magnus Gustafsson
17 Jul	Mercedes Cup; Stuttgart, Germany; ATP Championship Series; Clay – $915,000 – 48S/24D; Singles – Doubles	(Spain) Tomás Carbonell (Spain) Francisco Roig; 3-6, 6-3, 6-4	(South Africa) Ellis Ferreira (Netherlands) Jan Siemerink	(Spain) Sergi Bruguera (France) Arnaud Boetsch	(Spain) Tomás Carbonell (Germany) Carl-Uwe Steeb (Spain) Albert Costa (Sweden) Magnus Gustafsson
17 Jul	Legg Mason Tennis Classic; Washington, D.C., US; ATP Championship Series; Hard – $550,000 – 56S/28D; Singles – Doubles	(United States) Andre Agassi; 6–4, 2–6, 7–5	(Sweden) Stefan Edberg	(United States) Todd Martin (Australia) Patrick Rafter	(Colombia) Mauricio Hadad (Australia) Jason Stoltenberg (United States) Patrick McEnroe (Italy) Cristiano Caratti
17 Jul	Legg Mason Tennis Classic; Washington, D.C., US; ATP Championship Series; Hard – $550,000 – 56S/28D; Singles – Doubles	(France) Olivier Delaître (United States) Jeff Tarango; 1-6, 6-3, 6-2	(Czech Republic) Petr Korda (Czech Republic) Cyril Suk	(United States) Todd Martin (Australia) Patrick Rafter	(Colombia) Mauricio Hadad (Australia) Jason Stoltenberg (United States) Patrick McEnroe (Italy) Cristiano Caratti
24 Jul	Canadian Open; Montreal, Quebec, Canada; ATP Championship Series, Single-Week; Hard – $1,545,000 – 56S/28D; Singles – Doubles	(United States) Andre Agassi; 3–6, 6–2, 6–3	(United States) Pete Sampras	(Sweden) Mats Wilander (Sweden) Thomas Enqvist	(United States) MaliVai Washington (Russia) Yevgeny Kafelnikov (United States) Michael Chang (Germany) Michael Stich
24 Jul	Canadian Open; Montreal, Quebec, Canada; ATP Championship Series, Single-Week; Hard – $1,545,000 – 56S/28D; Singles – Doubles	(Russia) Yevgeny Kafelnikov (Russia) Andrei Olhovskiy; 6–4, 6–4	(United States) Brian MacPhie (Australia) Sandon Stolle	(Sweden) Mats Wilander (Sweden) Thomas Enqvist	(United States) MaliVai Washington (Russia) Yevgeny Kafelnikov (United States) Michael Chang (Germany) Michael Stich
24 Jul	Dutch Open; Amsterdam, The Netherlands; ATP World Series; Clay – $475,000 – 32S/16D; Singles – Doubles	(Chile) Marcelo Ríos; 6–4, 7–5, 6–4	(Netherlands) Jan Siemerink	(Spain) Carlos Costa (Austria) Gilbert Schaller	(Uruguay) Marcelo Filippini (Germany) Bernd Karbacher (Czech Republic) Bohdan Ulihrach (Czech Republic) Karel Nováček
24 Jul	Dutch Open; Amsterdam, The Netherlands; ATP World Series; Clay – $475,000 – 32S/16D; Singles – Doubles	(Chile) Marcelo Ríos (Netherlands) Sjeng Schalken; 7–6, 6–2	(Australia) Wayne Arthurs (United Kingdom) Neil Broad	(Spain) Carlos Costa (Austria) Gilbert Schaller	(Uruguay) Marcelo Filippini (Germany) Bernd Karbacher (Czech Republic) Bohdan Ulihrach (Czech Republic) Karel Nováček
31 Jul	Austrian Open; Kitzbühel, Austria; ATP World Series; Clay – $400,000 – 48S/24D; Singles – Doubles	(Spain) Albert Costa; 4–6, 6–4, 7–6^{(7–3)}, 2–6, 6–4	(Austria) Thomas Muster	(Austria) Gilbert Schaller (Germany) Bernd Karbacher	(Hungary) Sándor Noszály (Spain) Alberto Berasategui (Italy) Andrea Gaudenzi (Italy) Stefano Pescosolido
31 Jul	Austrian Open; Kitzbühel, Austria; ATP World Series; Clay – $400,000 – 48S/24D; Singles – Doubles	(United States) Francisco Montana (United States) Greg Van Emburgh; 6-7, 6-3, 7-6	(Spain) Jordi Arrese (Australia) Wayne Arthurs	(Austria) Gilbert Schaller (Germany) Bernd Karbacher	(Hungary) Sándor Noszály (Spain) Alberto Berasategui (Italy) Andrea Gaudenzi (Italy) Stefano Pescosolido
31 Jul	Skoda Czech Open; Prague, Czech Republic; ATP World Series; Clay – $340,000 – 32S/16D; Singles – Doubles	(Czech Republic) Bohdan Ulihrach; 6–2, 6–2	(Spain) Javier Sánchez	(Spain) Albert Portas (Sweden) Nicklas Kulti	(Switzerland) Marc Rosset (Morocco) Karim Alami (Argentina) Gastón Etlis (Argentina) Mariano Zabaleta
31 Jul	Skoda Czech Open; Prague, Czech Republic; ATP World Series; Clay – $340,000 – 32S/16D; Singles – Doubles	(Belgium) Libor Pimek (South Africa) Byron Talbot; 7–5, 1–6, 7–6	(Czech Republic) Jiří Novák (Czech Republic) David Rikl	(Spain) Albert Portas (Sweden) Nicklas Kulti	(Switzerland) Marc Rosset (Morocco) Karim Alami (Argentina) Gastón Etlis (Argentina) Mariano Zabaleta
31 Jul	Infiniti Open; Los Angeles, CA, US; ATP World Series; Hard – $303,000 – 32S/16D; Singles – Doubles	(Germany) Michael Stich; 6–7^{(7–9)}, 7–6^{(7–4)}, 6–2	(Sweden) Thomas Enqvist	(Croatia) Goran Ivanišević (Switzerland) Jakob Hlasek	(South Africa) Marcos Ondruska (United States) Michael Joyce (Australia) Patrick Rafter (Russia) Alexander Volkov
31 Jul	Infiniti Open; Los Angeles, CA, US; ATP World Series; Hard – $303,000 – 32S/16D; Singles – Doubles	(South Africa) Brent Haygarth (United States) Kent Kinnear; 6–4, 7–6	(United States) Scott Davis (Croatia) Goran Ivanišević	(Croatia) Goran Ivanišević (Switzerland) Jakob Hlasek	(South Africa) Marcos Ondruska (United States) Michael Joyce (Australia) Patrick Rafter (Russia) Alexander Volkov

=== August ===
Week	Tournament	Champions	Runners-up	Semifinalists	Quarterfinalists
7 Aug	Thriftway ATP Championships; Mason, Ohio, US; ATP Championship Series, Single-Week; Hard – $1,545,000 – 56S/28D; Singles – Doubles	(United States) Andre Agassi; 7–5, 6–2	(United States) Michael Chang	(Sweden) Thomas Enqvist (Germany) Michael Stich	(Italy) Renzo Furlan (Croatia) Goran Ivanišević (United States) Jim Courier (United States) Pete Sampras
7 Aug	Thriftway ATP Championships; Mason, Ohio, US; ATP Championship Series, Single-Week; Hard – $1,545,000 – 56S/28D; Singles – Doubles	(Australia) Todd Woodbridge (Australia) Mark Woodforde; 6–2, 3–0 retired	(The Bahamas) Mark Knowles (Canada) Daniel Nestor	(Sweden) Thomas Enqvist (Germany) Michael Stich	(Italy) Renzo Furlan (Croatia) Goran Ivanišević (United States) Jim Courier (United States) Pete Sampras
7 Aug	Campionati Internazionali di San Marino; San Marino, San Marino; ATP World Series; Clay – $303,000 – 32S/16D; Singles – Doubles	(Austria) Thomas Muster; 6–2, 6–0	(Italy) Andrea Gaudenzi	(Italy) Stefano Pescosolido (Belgium) Filip Dewulf	(Romania) Adrian Voinea (Spain) Albert Costa (Italy) Diego Nargiso (Czech Republic) Ctislav Doseděl
7 Aug	Campionati Internazionali di San Marino; San Marino, San Marino; ATP World Series; Clay – $303,000 – 32S/16D; Singles – Doubles	(Spain) Jordi Arrese (Australia) Andrew Kratzmann; 7–6, 3–6, 6–2	(Argentina) Pablo Albano (Italy) Federico Mordegan	(Italy) Stefano Pescosolido (Belgium) Filip Dewulf	(Romania) Adrian Voinea (Spain) Albert Costa (Italy) Diego Nargiso (Czech Republic) Ctislav Doseděl
14 Aug	RCA Championships; Indianapolis, IN, US; ATP Championship Series; Hard – $915,000 – 56S/28D; Singles – Doubles	(Sweden) Thomas Enqvist; 6–4, 6–3	(Germany) Bernd Karbacher	(United States) Pete Sampras (Croatia) Goran Ivanišević	(Ukraine) Andrei Medvedev (United States) Richey Reneberg (France) Jérôme Golmard (Spain) Alberto Berasategui
14 Aug	RCA Championships; Indianapolis, IN, US; ATP Championship Series; Hard – $915,000 – 56S/28D; Singles – Doubles	(The Bahamas) Mark Knowles (Canada) Daniel Nestor; 6-4, 6-4	(United States) Scott Davis (United States) Todd Martin	(United States) Pete Sampras (Croatia) Goran Ivanišević	(Ukraine) Andrei Medvedev (United States) Richey Reneberg (France) Jérôme Golmard (Spain) Alberto Berasategui
14 Aug	Volvo International; New Haven, CT, US; ATP Championship Series; Hard – $915,000 – 56S/24D; Singles – Doubles	(United States) Andre Agassi; 3–6, 7–6^{(7–2)}, 6–3	(Netherlands) Richard Krajicek	(Sweden) Mats Wilander (Russia) Yevgeny Kafelnikov	(Spain) Sergi Bruguera (Switzerland) Marc Rosset (Canada) Albert Chang (Germany) Boris Becker
14 Aug	Volvo International; New Haven, CT, US; ATP Championship Series; Hard – $915,000 – 56S/24D; Singles – Doubles	(United States) Rick Leach (United States) Scott Melville; 7-6, 6-4	(India) Leander Paes (Venezuela) Nicolás Pereira	(Sweden) Mats Wilander (Russia) Yevgeny Kafelnikov	(Spain) Sergi Bruguera (Switzerland) Marc Rosset (Canada) Albert Chang (Germany) Boris Becker
21 Aug	Waldbaum's Hamlet Cup; Long Island, NY, US; ATP World Series; Hard – $303,000 – 32S/16D; Singles – Doubles	(Russia) Yevgeny Kafelnikov; 7–6^{(7–0)}, 6–2	(Netherlands) Jan Siemerink	(Switzerland) Marc Rosset (Italy) Renzo Furlan	(Japan) Shuzo Matsuoka (France) Cédric Pioline (United States) MaliVai Washington (Australia) Todd Woodbridge
21 Aug	Waldbaum's Hamlet Cup; Long Island, NY, US; ATP World Series; Hard – $303,000 – 32S/16D; Singles – Doubles	(Czech Republic) Cyril Suk (Czech Republic) Daniel Vacek; 5–7, 7–6, 7–6	(United States) Rick Leach (United States) Scott Melville	(Switzerland) Marc Rosset (Italy) Renzo Furlan	(Japan) Shuzo Matsuoka (France) Cédric Pioline (United States) MaliVai Washington (Australia) Todd Woodbridge
21 Aug	Croatia Open Umag; Umag, Croatia; ATP World Series; Clay – $375,000 – 32S/16D; Singles – Doubles	(Austria) Thomas Muster; 3–6, 7–6^{(7–5)}, 6–4	(Spain) Carlos Costa	(Spain) Francisco Clavet (Italy) Andrea Gaudenzi	(Spain) Jordi Arrese (Sweden) Magnus Gustafsson (Spain) Javier Sánchez (Spain) Alberto Berasategui
21 Aug	Croatia Open Umag; Umag, Croatia; ATP World Series; Clay – $375,000 – 32S/16D; Singles – Doubles	(Argentina) Luis Lobo (Spain) Javier Sánchez; 6–4, 6–0	(Sweden) David Ekerot (Hungary) László Markovits	(Spain) Francisco Clavet (Italy) Andrea Gaudenzi	(Spain) Jordi Arrese (Sweden) Magnus Gustafsson (Spain) Javier Sánchez (Spain) Alberto Berasategui
28 Aug; 4 Sep	US Open; New York City, US; Grand Slam; Hard – $4,282,400 – 128S/64D/32X; Singles – Doubles – Mixed doubles	(United States) Pete Sampras; 6–4, 6–3, 4–6, 7–5	(United States) Andre Agassi	(Germany) Boris Becker (United States) Jim Courier	(Czech Republic) Petr Korda (United States) Patrick McEnroe (United States) Michael Chang (Zimbabwe) Byron Black
28 Aug; 4 Sep	US Open; New York City, US; Grand Slam; Hard – $4,282,400 – 128S/64D/32X; Singles – Doubles – Mixed doubles	(Australia) Todd Woodbridge (Australia) Mark Woodforde; 6–3, 6–3	(United States) Alex O'Brien (Australia) Sandon Stolle	(Germany) Boris Becker (United States) Jim Courier	(Czech Republic) Petr Korda (United States) Patrick McEnroe (United States) Michael Chang (Zimbabwe) Byron Black
28 Aug; 4 Sep	US Open; New York City, US; Grand Slam; Hard – $4,282,400 – 128S/64D/32X; Singles – Doubles – Mixed doubles	(United States) Matt Lucena (United States) Meredith McGrath; 6–4, 6–4	(Czech Republic) Cyril Suk (United States) Gigi Fernández	(Germany) Boris Becker (United States) Jim Courier	(Czech Republic) Petr Korda (United States) Patrick McEnroe (United States) Michael Chang (Zimbabwe) Byron Black

=== September ===
Week	Tournament	Champions	Runners-up	Semifinalists	Quarterfinalists
11 Sep	Romanian Open; Bucharest, Romania; ATP World Series; Clay – $1,350,000 – 32S/16D; Singles – Doubles	(Austria) Thomas Muster; 6–3, 6–4	(Austria) Gilbert Schaller	(Hungary) Sándor Noszály (Norway) Christian Ruud	(France) Arnaud Boetsch (Spain) Sergi Bruguera (Italy) Andrea Gaudenzi (Spain) Jordi Arrese
11 Sep	Romanian Open; Bucharest, Romania; ATP World Series; Clay – $1,350,000 – 32S/16D; Singles – Doubles	(United States) Mark Keil (United States) Jeff Tarango; 6–4, 7–6	(Czech Republic) Cyril Suk (Czech Republic) Daniel Vacek	(Hungary) Sándor Noszály (Norway) Christian Ruud	(France) Arnaud Boetsch (Spain) Sergi Bruguera (Italy) Andrea Gaudenzi (Spain) Jordi Arrese
11 Sep	Club Colombia Open; Bogotá, Colombia; ATP World Series; Clay – $303,000 – 32S/16D	(Ecuador) Nicolás Lapentti; 2–6, 6–1, 6–4	(Colombia) Miguel Tobón	(Brazil) Fernando Meligeni (Ecuador) Luis Adrian Morejon	(Argentina) Hernán Gumy (Morocco) Karim Alami (Chile) Marcelo Ríos (Spain) Alberto Berasategui
11 Sep	Club Colombia Open; Bogotá, Colombia; ATP World Series; Clay – $303,000 – 32S/16D	(Czech Republic) Jiří Novák (Czech Republic) David Rikl; 7–6, 6–2	(United States) Steve Campbell (United States) MaliVai Washington	(Brazil) Fernando Meligeni (Ecuador) Luis Adrian Morejon	(Argentina) Hernán Gumy (Morocco) Karim Alami (Chile) Marcelo Ríos (Spain) Alberto Berasategui
11 Sep	Grand Prix Passing Shot; Bordeaux, France; ATP World Series; Hard – $375,000 – 32S/16D; Singles – Doubles	(Senegal) Yahiya Doumbia; 6–4, 6–4	(Switzerland) Jakob Hlasek	(Australia) Jason Stoltenberg (France) Lionel Roux	(Croatia) Goran Ivanišević (France) Olivier Delaître (France) Guillaume Raoux (Haiti) Ronald Agénor
11 Sep	Grand Prix Passing Shot; Bordeaux, France; ATP World Series; Hard – $375,000 – 32S/16D; Singles – Doubles	(Croatia) Saša Hiršzon (Croatia) Goran Ivanišević; 6–3, 6–4	(Sweden) Henrik Holm (United Kingdom) Danny Sapsford	(Australia) Jason Stoltenberg (France) Lionel Roux	(Croatia) Goran Ivanišević (France) Olivier Delaître (France) Guillaume Raoux (Haiti) Ronald Agénor
18 Sep	Davis Cup Semifinals; Las Vegas, Nevada, US – hard Moscow, Russia – clay (i)	Semifinal winners United States 4–1; Russia 3–2	Semifinal losers Sweden; Germany		
25 Sep	Campionati Internazionali di Sicilia; Palermo, Italy; ATP World Series; Clay – $303,000 – 32S/16D; Singles – Doubles	(Spain) Francisco Clavet; 6–7^{(2–7)}, 6–3, 7–6^{(7–1)}	(Spain) Jordi Burillo	(Argentina) Hernán Gumy (Italy) Omar Camporese	(France) Fabrice Santoro (Spain) Tomás Carbonell (Germany) Marc-Kevin Goellner (Netherlands) Sjeng Schalken
25 Sep	Campionati Internazionali di Sicilia; Palermo, Italy; ATP World Series; Clay – $303,000 – 32S/16D; Singles – Doubles	(Spain) Àlex Corretja (France) Fabrice Santoro; 6–7, 6–4, 6–3	(Netherlands) Hendrik Jan Davids (South Africa) Piet Norval	(Argentina) Hernán Gumy (Italy) Omar Camporese	(France) Fabrice Santoro (Spain) Tomás Carbonell (Germany) Marc-Kevin Goellner (Netherlands) Sjeng Schalken
25 Sep	Davidoff Swiss Indoors; Basel, Switzerland; ATP World Series; Carpet (i) – $975,000 – 32S/16D; Singles – Doubles	(United States) Jim Courier; 6–7^{(2–7)}, 7–6^{(7–5)}, 5–7, 6–2, 7–5	(Netherlands) Jan Siemerink	(Germany) Boris Becker (United Kingdom) Greg Rusedski	(Sweden) Stefan Edberg (Czech Republic) Petr Korda (Czech Republic) Martin Damm (Australia) Jason Stoltenberg
25 Sep	Davidoff Swiss Indoors; Basel, Switzerland; ATP World Series; Carpet (i) – $975,000 – 32S/16D; Singles – Doubles	(Czech Republic) Cyril Suk (Czech Republic) Daniel Vacek; 3–6, 6–3, 6–3	(United States) Mark Keil (Sweden) Peter Nyborg	(Germany) Boris Becker (United Kingdom) Greg Rusedski	(Sweden) Stefan Edberg (Czech Republic) Petr Korda (Czech Republic) Martin Damm (Australia) Jason Stoltenberg

=== October ===
Week	Tournament	Champions	Runners-up	Semifinalists	Quarterfinalists
2 Oct	Salem Open Kuala Lumpur; Kuala Lumpur, Malaysia; ATP World Series $389,250	(Chile) Marcelo Ríos; 7–6^{(8–6)}, 6–2	(Australia) Mark Philippoussis	(Italy) Cristiano Caratti (United States) Patrick McEnroe	(Netherlands) Richard Krajicek (Netherlands) Jacco Eltingh (Italy) Renzo Furlan (Netherlands) Paul Haarhuis
2 Oct	Salem Open Kuala Lumpur; Kuala Lumpur, Malaysia; ATP World Series $389,250	(United States) Patrick McEnroe (Australia) Mark Philippoussis; 7–5, 6–4	(Canada) Grant Connell (United States) Patrick Galbraith	(Italy) Cristiano Caratti (United States) Patrick McEnroe	(Netherlands) Richard Krajicek (Netherlands) Jacco Eltingh (Italy) Renzo Furlan (Netherlands) Paul Haarhuis
2 Oct	Grand Prix de Tennis de Toulouse; Toulouse, France; ATP World Series; Hard (i) – $375,000 – 32S/16D; Singles – Doubles	(France) Arnaud Boetsch; 6–4, 6–7^{(5–7)}, 6–0	(United States) Jim Courier	(France) Cédric Pioline (Switzerland) Marc Rosset	(Slovakia) Karol Kučera (Czech Republic) Daniel Vacek (Belgium) Filip Dewulf (United States) Jared Palmer
2 Oct	Grand Prix de Tennis de Toulouse; Toulouse, France; ATP World Series; Hard (i) – $375,000 – 32S/16D; Singles – Doubles	(Sweden) Jonas Björkman (South Africa) John-Laffnie de Jager; 7–6, 7–6	(United States) Dave Randall (United States) Greg Van Emburgh	(France) Cédric Pioline (Switzerland) Marc Rosset	(Slovakia) Karol Kučera (Czech Republic) Daniel Vacek (Belgium) Filip Dewulf (United States) Jared Palmer
2 Oct	Valencia Open; Valencia, Spain; ATP World Series; Clay – $203,000 – 32S/16D; Singles – Doubles	(Netherlands) Sjeng Schalken; 6–4, 6–2	(Austria) Gilbert Schaller	(Spain) Félix Mantilla (Argentina) Hernán Gumy	(Spain) Alberto Berasategui (Sweden) Magnus Gustafsson (Australia) Richard Fromberg (Spain) Tomás Carbonell
2 Oct	Valencia Open; Valencia, Spain; ATP World Series; Clay – $203,000 – 32S/16D; Singles – Doubles	(Spain) Tomás Carbonell (Spain) Francisco Roig; 7–5, 6–3	(Netherlands) Tom Kempers (United States) Jack Waite	(Spain) Félix Mantilla (Argentina) Hernán Gumy	(Spain) Alberto Berasategui (Sweden) Magnus Gustafsson (Australia) Richard Fromberg (Spain) Tomás Carbonell
9 Oct	Tokyo Indoor; Tokyo Indoor, Japan; ATP Championship Series $895,000; Singles – Doubles	(United States) Michael Chang; 6–3, 6–4	(Australia) Mark Philippoussis	(Sweden) Henrik Holm (Germany) Hendrik Dreekmann	(Russia) Alexander Volkov (Zimbabwe) Byron Black (Netherlands) Richard Krajicek (Croatia) Goran Ivanišević
9 Oct	Tokyo Indoor; Tokyo Indoor, Japan; ATP Championship Series $895,000; Singles – Doubles	(Netherlands) Jacco Eltingh (Netherlands) Paul Haarhuis; 7–6, 6–4	(Switzerland) Jakob Hlasek (United States) Patrick McEnroe	(Sweden) Henrik Holm (Germany) Hendrik Dreekmann	(Russia) Alexander Volkov (Zimbabwe) Byron Black (Netherlands) Richard Krajicek (Croatia) Goran Ivanišević
9 Oct	Tel Aviv Open; Tel Aviv, Israel; ATP World Series $250,000; Singles – Doubles	(Slovakia) Ján Krošlák; 6–3, 6–4	(Spain) Javier Sánchez	(Italy) Stefano Pescosolido (United States) David Wheaton	(Denmark) Frederik Fetterlein (United States) Jared Palmer (Czech Republic) Radomír Vašek (Australia) Jason Stoltenberg
9 Oct	Tel Aviv Open; Tel Aviv, Israel; ATP World Series $250,000; Singles – Doubles	(United States) Jim Grabb (United States) Jared Palmer; 6–4, 7–5	(United States) Kent Kinnear (United States) David Wheaton	(Italy) Stefano Pescosolido (United States) David Wheaton	(Denmark) Frederik Fetterlein (United States) Jared Palmer (Czech Republic) Radomír Vašek (Australia) Jason Stoltenberg
9 Oct	IPB Czech Indoor; Ostrava, Czech Republic; ATP World Series $375,000; Singles – Doubles	(South Africa) Wayne Ferreira; 3–6, 6–4, 6–3	(United States) MaliVai Washington	(Germany) Patrik Kühnen (France) Arnaud Boetsch	(Netherlands) Joost Winnink (Australia) Patrick Rafter (Ukraine) Andrei Medvedev (Sweden) Jonas Björkman
9 Oct	IPB Czech Indoor; Ostrava, Czech Republic; ATP World Series $375,000; Singles – Doubles	(Sweden) Jonas Björkman (Argentina) Javier Frana; 6–7, 6–4, 7–6	(France) Guy Forget (Australia) Patrick Rafter	(Germany) Patrik Kühnen (France) Arnaud Boetsch	(Netherlands) Joost Winnink (Australia) Patrick Rafter (Ukraine) Andrei Medvedev (Sweden) Jonas Björkman
16 Oct	Grand Prix de Tennis de Lyon; Lyon, France; ATP World Series $575,000; Singles – Doubles	(South Africa) Wayne Ferreira; 7–6^{(7–2)}, 5–7, 6–3	(United States) Pete Sampras	(United States) Todd Martin (Russia) Yevgeny Kafelnikov	(France) Maxime Huard (Australia) Patrick Rafter (Germany) David Prinosil (France) Cédric Pioline
16 Oct	Grand Prix de Tennis de Lyon; Lyon, France; ATP World Series $575,000; Singles – Doubles	(Switzerland) Jakob Hlasek (Russia) Yevgeny Kafelnikov; 6–3, 6–3	(South Africa) John-Laffnie de Jager (South Africa) Wayne Ferreira	(United States) Todd Martin (Russia) Yevgeny Kafelnikov	(France) Maxime Huard (Australia) Patrick Rafter (Germany) David Prinosil (France) Cédric Pioline
16 Oct	CA-TennisTrophy; Vienna, Austria; ATP World Series $465,000; Singles – Doubles	(Belgium) Filip Dewulf; 7–5, 6–2, 1–6, 7–5	(Austria) Thomas Muster	(Australia) Todd Woodbridge (Sweden) Jonas Björkman	(Russia) Alexander Volkov (Germany) Michael Stich (Uzbekistan) Oleg Ogorodov (United States) Jeff Tarango
16 Oct	CA-TennisTrophy; Vienna, Austria; ATP World Series $465,000; Singles – Doubles	(South Africa) Ellis Ferreira (Netherlands) Jan Siemerink; 6–4 7–5	(Australia) Todd Woodbridge (Australia) Mark Woodforde	(Australia) Todd Woodbridge (Sweden) Jonas Björkman	(Russia) Alexander Volkov (Germany) Michael Stich (Uzbekistan) Oleg Ogorodov (United States) Jeff Tarango
16 Oct	Nokia Open; Beijing, China; ATP World Series $303,000; Singles – Doubles	(United States) Michael Chang; 7–5, 6–3	(Italy) Renzo Furlan	(South Africa) David Nainkin (Japan) Shuzo Matsuoka	(Australia) Michael Tebbutt (India) Leander Paes (Australia) Scott Draper (Italy) Gianluca Pozzi
16 Oct	Nokia Open; Beijing, China; ATP World Series $303,000; Singles – Doubles	(United States) Tommy Ho (Canada) Sébastien Lareau; 7–6, 7–6	(Belgium) Dick Norman (Netherlands) Fernon Wibier	(South Africa) David Nainkin (Japan) Shuzo Matsuoka	(Australia) Michael Tebbutt (India) Leander Paes (Australia) Scott Draper (Italy) Gianluca Pozzi
23 Oct	Eurocard Open; Essen Masters, Germany; ATP Championship Series, Single-Week $1,844,000; Singles – Doubles	(Austria) Thomas Muster; 7–6^{(8–6)}, 2–6, 6–3, 6–4	(United States) MaliVai Washington	(France) Arnaud Boetsch (United States) Pete Sampras	(Sweden) Thomas Enqvist (Netherlands) Richard Krajicek (Spain) Sergi Bruguera (United States) Jim Courier
23 Oct	Eurocard Open; Essen Masters, Germany; ATP Championship Series, Single-Week $1,844,000; Singles – Doubles	(Netherlands) Jacco Eltingh (Netherlands) Paul Haarhuis; 7-5, 6-4	(Czech Republic) Cyril Suk (Czech Republic) Daniel Vacek	(France) Arnaud Boetsch (United States) Pete Sampras	(Sweden) Thomas Enqvist (Netherlands) Richard Krajicek (Spain) Sergi Bruguera (United States) Jim Courier
23 Oct	Hellmann's Cup; Santiago, Chile; ATP World Series $203,750; Singles – Doubles	(Czech Republic) Slava Doseděl; 7–6^{(7–3)}, 6–3	(Chile) Marcelo Ríos	(Argentina) Hernán Gumy (Spain) Albert Costa	(Spain) Àlex Corretja (Czech Republic) David Rikl (Colombia) Mauricio Hadad (Netherlands) Sjeng Schalken
23 Oct	Hellmann's Cup; Santiago, Chile; ATP World Series $203,750; Singles – Doubles	(Czech Republic) Jiří Novák (Czech Republic) David Rikl; 6–4, 4–6, 6–1	(United States) Shelby Cannon (United States) Francisco Montana	(Argentina) Hernán Gumy (Spain) Albert Costa	(Spain) Àlex Corretja (Czech Republic) David Rikl (Colombia) Mauricio Hadad (Netherlands) Sjeng Schalken
30 Oct	Paris Open; Paris Masters, France; ATP Championship Series, Single-Week $2,000,000; Singles – Doubles	(United States) Pete Sampras; 7–6^{(7–5)}, 6–4, 6–4	(Germany) Boris Becker	(United States) Jim Courier (South Africa) Wayne Ferreira	(Switzerland) Jakob Hlasek (United States) Michael Chang (Netherlands) Richard Krajicek (Czech Republic) Daniel Vacek
30 Oct	Paris Open; Paris Masters, France; ATP Championship Series, Single-Week $2,000,000; Singles – Doubles	(Canada) Grant Connell (United States) Patrick Galbraith; 6-2, 6-2	(United States) Jim Grabb (United States) Todd Martin	(United States) Jim Courier (South Africa) Wayne Ferreira	(Switzerland) Jakob Hlasek (United States) Michael Chang (Netherlands) Richard Krajicek (Czech Republic) Daniel Vacek
30 Oct	Topper Open; Montevideo, Uruguay; ATP World Series; Clay – $203,000 – 32S/16D; Singles – Doubles	(Czech Republic) Bohdan Ulihrach; 6–2, 6–3	(Spain) Alberto Berasategui	(Spain) Francisco Clavet (Spain) Jordi Burillo	(Morocco) Karim Alami (Argentina) Hernán Gumy (Brazil) Fernando Meligeni (Uruguay) Marcelo Filippini
30 Oct	Topper Open; Montevideo, Uruguay; ATP World Series; Clay – $203,000 – 32S/16D; Singles – Doubles	(Spain) Sergio Casal (Spain) Emilio Sánchez; 2-6, 7-6, 7-6	(Czech Republic) Jiří Novák (Czech Republic) David Rikl	(Spain) Francisco Clavet (Spain) Jordi Burillo	(Morocco) Karim Alami (Argentina) Hernán Gumy (Brazil) Fernando Meligeni (Uruguay) Marcelo Filippini

=== November ===
Week	Tournament	Champions	Runners-up	Semifinalists	Quarterfinalists
6 Nov	Topper South American Open; Buenos Aires, Argentina; ATP World Series; Clay – $303,000 – 32S/16D; Singles – Doubles	(Spain) Carlos Moyá; 6–0, 6–3	(Spain) Félix Mantilla	(Czech Republic) Jiří Novák (Spain) Àlex Corretja	(Spain) Galo Blanco (Spain) Alberto Berasategui (Argentina) Hernán Gumy (Spain) Emilio Sánchez
6 Nov	Topper South American Open; Buenos Aires, Argentina; ATP World Series; Clay – $303,000 – 32S/16D; Singles – Doubles	(United States) Vincent Spadea (South Africa) Christo van Rensburg; 6–3, 6–3	(Czech Republic) Jiří Novák (Czech Republic) David Rikl	(Czech Republic) Jiří Novák (Spain) Àlex Corretja	(Spain) Galo Blanco (Spain) Alberto Berasategui (Argentina) Hernán Gumy (Spain) Emilio Sánchez
6 Nov	Stockholm Open; Stockholm, Sweden; ATP World Series; Hard (i) – $800,000 – 32S/16D; Singles – Doubles	(Sweden) Thomas Enqvist; 7–5, 6–4	(France) Arnaud Boetsch	(Germany) David Prinosil (United States) Richey Reneberg	(United States) Jim Courier (Sweden) Mikael Tillström (Sweden) Magnus Larsson (Sweden) Stefan Edberg
6 Nov	Stockholm Open; Stockholm, Sweden; ATP World Series; Hard (i) – $800,000 – 32S/16D; Singles – Doubles	(Netherlands) Jacco Eltingh (Netherlands) Paul Haarhuis; 3–6, 6–2, 7–6	(Canada) Grant Connell (United States) Patrick Galbraith	(Germany) David Prinosil (United States) Richey Reneberg	(United States) Jim Courier (Sweden) Mikael Tillström (Sweden) Magnus Larsson (Sweden) Stefan Edberg
6 Nov	Kremlin Cup; Moscow, Russia; ATP World Series; Carpet (i) – $1,125,000 – 32S/16D; Singles – Doubles	(Germany) Carl-Uwe Steeb; 7–6^{(7–5)}, 3–6, 7–6^{(8–6)}	(Czech Republic) Daniel Vacek	(Russia) Yevgeny Kafelnikov (Switzerland) Marc Rosset	(Zimbabwe) Byron Black (Russia) Alexander Volkov (Australia) Scott Draper (Russia) Andrei Olhovskiy
6 Nov	Kremlin Cup; Moscow, Russia; ATP World Series; Carpet (i) – $1,125,000 – 32S/16D; Singles – Doubles	(Zimbabwe) Byron Black (United States) Jared Palmer; 6–4, 3–6, 6–3	(United States) Tommy Ho (New Zealand) Brett Steven	(Russia) Yevgeny Kafelnikov (Switzerland) Marc Rosset	(Zimbabwe) Byron Black (Russia) Alexander Volkov (Australia) Scott Draper (Russia) Andrei Olhovskiy
13 Nov	ATP World Tour Championships Singles; Frankfurt, Germany; ATP Tour World Championships; Carpet (i); Singles	(Germany) Boris Becker; 7–6^{(7–3)}, 6–0, 7–6^{(7–5)}	(United States) Michael Chang	(Sweden) Thomas Enqvist (United States) Pete Sampras	(Russia) Yevgeny Kafelnikov (South Africa) Wayne Ferreira (United States) Jim Courier (Austria) Thomas Muster
20 Nov	ATP World Tour Championships Doubles; Eindhoven, Netherlands; ATP Tour World Championships; Carpet (i); Doubles	(Canada) Grant Connell (United States) Patrick Galbraith; 7–6^{(8–6)}, 7–6^{(8–6)}, 3–6, 7–6^{(7–2)}	(Netherlands) Jacco Eltingh (Netherlands) Paul Haarhuis	Semifinalists (Australia) Todd Woodbridge / (Australia) Mark Woodforde (Czech Republic) Cyril Suk / (Czech Republic) Daniel Vacek	
27 Nov	Davis Cup Final; Moscow, Russia – clay (i)	United States; 3–2	Russia		

=== December ===
Week	Tournament	Champions	Runners-up	Semifinalists	Quarterfinalists
6 Dec	Grand Slam Cup; Munich, Germany; Grand Slam Cup; Carpet (i)	(Croatia) Goran Ivanišević; 7–6^{(7–4)}, 6–3, 6–4	(United States) Todd Martin	(Russia) Yevgeny Kafelnikov (Germany) Boris Becker	(United States) Pete Sampras (Netherlands) Jacco Eltingh (Zimbabwe) Byron Black (Ukraine) Andriy Medvedev

== ATP rankings ==
As of 9 January 1995
Rk	Name	Nation
1	Pete Sampras	USA
2	Andre Agassi	USA
3	Boris Becker	GER
4	Sergi Bruguera	ESP
5	Goran Ivanišević	CRO
6	Michael Chang	USA
7	Stefan Edberg	SWE
8	Alberto Berasategui	ESP
9	Michael Stich	GER
10	Todd Martin	USA
11	Jim Courier	USA
12	Yevgeny Kafelnikov	RUS
13	Wayne Ferreira	RSA
14	Marc Rosset	SUI
15	Andrei Medvedev	UKR
16	Thomas Muster	AUT
17	Magnus Larsson	SWE
18	Richard Krajicek	NED
19	Petr Korda	CZE
20	Jason Stoltenberg	AUS

Year-end rankings 1995 (25 December 1995)
Rk	Name	Nation	Points	High	Low	Change
1	Pete Sampras	USA	4842	1	2	Steady
2	Andre Agassi	USA	4765	1	2	Steady
3	Thomas Muster	AUT	4474	3	19	▲13
4	Boris Becker	GER	3325	3	5	▼1
5	Michael Chang	USA	3211	4	8	▲1
6	Yevgeny Kafelnikov	RUS	2560	6	12	▲6
7	Thomas Enqvist	SWE	2505	7	53	▲46
8	Jim Courier	USA	2471	7	15	▲3
9	Wayne Ferreira	RSA	2144	6	15	▲4
10	Goran Ivanišević	CRO	1861	4	10	▼5
11	Richard Krajicek	NED	1756	10	18	▲7
12	Michael Stich	GER	1727	6	13	▼3
13	Sergi Bruguera	ESP	1666	4	13	▼9
14	Arnaud Boetsch	FRA	1530	14	60	▲23
15	Marc Rosset	SUI	1391	9	18	▼1
16	Andrei Medvedev	UKR	1386	12	20	▼1
17	Magnus Larsson	SWE	1334	10	18	Steady
18	Todd Martin	USA	1268	10	21	▼8
19	Paul Haarhuis	NED	1266	18	59	▲40
20	Gilbert Schaller	AUT	1256	17	58	▲38

== Statistical information ==
Players and singles titles won, listed in alphabetical order:

- (United States) Andre Agassi – Australian Open, San Jose, Miami Masters, Washington, D.C., Canadian Masters, Cincinnati Masters, New Haven (7)
- (Germany) Boris Becker – Marseille, Season-Ending Championships (2)
- (Spain) Alberto Berasategui – Oporto (1)
- (France) Arnaud Boetsch – Toulouse (1)
- (United States) Michael Chang – Hong Kong, Atlanta, Tokyo Indoors, Beijing (4)
- (Spain) Francisco Clavet – Palermo (1)
- (Spain) Albert Costa – Kitzbühel (1)
- (United States) Jim Courier – Adelaide, Scottsdale, Tokyo Outdoors, Basel (4)
- (Belgium) Filip Dewulf – Vienna (1)
- (Czech Republic) Slava Doseděl – Santiago (1)
- (Senegal) Yahiya Doumbia – Bordeaux (1)
- (Sweden) Stefan Edberg – Doha (1)
- (Sweden) Thomas Enqvist – Auckland, Philadelphia, Pinehurst, Indianapolis, Stockholm (5)
- (South Africa) Wayne Ferreira – Dubai, Munich, Ostrava, Lyon (4)
- (Argentina) Javier Frana – Nottingham (1)
- (Netherlands) Paul Haarhuis – Jakarta (1)
- (Colombia) Mauricio Hadad – Bermuda (1)
- (Russia) Yevgeny Kafelnikov – Milan, Saint Petersburg, Gstaad, Long Island (4)
- (Netherlands) Richard Krajicek – Stuttgart Indoors, Rotterdam (2)
- (Slovakia) Ján Krošlák – Tel Aviv (1)
- (Slovakia) Karol Kučera – Rosmalen (1)
- (Ecuador) Nicolás Lapentti – Bogotá (1)
- (United States) Todd Martin – Memphis (1)
- (United States) Patrick McEnroe – Sydney (1)
- (Ukraine) Andrei Medvedev – Hamburg Masters (1)
- (Brazil) Fernando Meligeni – Båstad (1)
- (Spain) Carlos Moyá – Buenos Aires (1)
- (Austria) Thomas Muster – Mexico City, Estoril, Barcelona, Monte Carlo Masters, Rome Masters, French Open, St. Poelten, Stuttgart Outdoors, San Marino, Umag, Bucharest, Essen Masters (12)
- (Germany) David Prinosil – Newport (1)
- (Chile) Marcelo Ríos – Bologna, Amsterdam, Kuala Lumpur (3)
- (Switzerland) Marc Rosset – Nice, Halle (2)
- (United States) Greg Rusedski – Seoul (1)
- (United States) Pete Sampras – Indian Wells Masters, London, Wimbledon, US Open, Paris Masters (5)
- (Netherlands) Sjeng Schalken – Valencia (1)
- (Austria) Gilbert Schaller – Casablanca (1)
- (Germany) Martin Sinner – Copenhagen, Johannesburg (2)
- (Germany) Carl-Uwe Steeb – Moscow (1)
- (Germany) Michael Stich – Los Angeles (1)
- (Czech Republic) Bohdan Ulihrach – Prague, Montevideo (2)
- (Australia) Todd Woodbridge – Coral Springs (1)

The following players won their first title:

- (Spain) Albert Costa – Kitzbühel
- (Belgium) Filip Dewulf – Vienna
- (Czech Republic) Slava Doseděl – Santiago
- (Netherlands) Paul Haarhuis – Jakarta
- (Colombia) Mauricio Hadad – Bermuda
- (Slovakia) Ján Krošlák – Tel Aviv
- (Slovakia) Karol Kučera – Rosmalen
- (Ecuador) Nicolás Lapentti – Bogotá
- (United States) Patrick McEnroe – Sydney
- (Brazil) Fernando Meligeni – Båstad
- (Spain) Carlos Moyá – Buenos Aires
- (Germany) David Prinosil – Newport
- (Chile) Marcelo Ríos – Bologna
- (Netherlands) Sjeng Schalken – Valencia
- (Austria) Gilbert Schaller – Casablanca
- (Germany) Martin Sinner – Copenhagen
- (Czech Republic) Bohdan Ulihrach – Prague
- (Australia) Todd Woodbridge – Coral Springs

== See also ==
- 1995 WTA Tour
