= 1995 Waldbaum's Hamlet Cup – Singles =

Singles
- 1995 Waldbaum's Hamlet Cup

Final
- Champion: (Russia) Yevgeny Kafelnikov
- Runner-up: (Netherlands) Jan Siemerink
- Score: 7–6^{(7–0)}, 6–2

Details
- Draw: 32
- Seeds: 8

Events
Singles	Doubles
- Waldbaum's Hamlet Cup

The 1998 Waldbaum's Hamlet Cup was a men's tennis tournament played on Hard courts in Long Island, United States that was part of the International Series of the 1995 ATP Tour. It was the tenth edition of the tournament and was held from 21–27 August 1998.

== Seeds ==
Champion seeds are indicated in bold text while text in italics indicates the round in which those seeds were eliminated.

1. (Russia) **Yevgeny Kafelnikov (champions)**
2. (South Africa) Wayne Ferreira (first round)
3. (Switzerland) Marc Rosset (semifinals)
4. (Ukraine) Andriy Medvedev (second round)
5. (Sweden) Stefan Edberg (first round)
6. (Netherlands) Jacco Eltingh (first round)
7. (Spain) Àlex Corretja (first round)
8. (Sweden) Jonas Björkman (first round)

== Draw ==
Key

- Q = Qualifier
- WC = Wild card
- LL = Lucky loser
- Alt = Alternate
- ITF = ITF entry
- PR = Protected ranking
- SR = Special ranking
- SE = Special exempt
- JE = Junior exempt
- JR = Junior Accelerator Programme entrant
- CO = College Accelerator Programme entrant
- NG = Next Gen Accelerator Program entrant
- w/o = Walkover
- r = Retired
- d = Defaulted

=== Finals ===
Semifinals
1	**(Russia) Yevgeny Kafelnikov**	**7**	**6**
3	(Switzerland) Marc Rosset	6	4
(Italy) Renzo Furlan	4	3
**(Netherlands) Jan Siemerink**	**6**	**6**

Final
1	**(Russia) Yevgeny Kafelnikov**	**7**	**6**
(Netherlands) Jan Siemerink	6^{0}	2

=== Top half ===
First round
1	**(Russia) Y Kafelnikov**	**6**	**6**
(France) O Delaître	1	3
**(Russia) A Volkov**	3	**6**	**6**
(Czech Republic) K Nováček	**6**	3	3
Q	**(Japan) S Matsuoka**	**6**	**7**
(Germany) B Karbacher	4	6
**(Russia) A Cherkasov**	**6**	**6**
7	(Spain) À Corretja	2	1
3	**(Switzerland) M Rosset**	**6**	**6**
(Czech Republic) M Damm	4	1
**(France) A Boetsch**	**6**	5	**6**
(Czech Republic) P Korda	3	**7**	2
**(France) C Pioline**	4	**7**	**7**
(Australia) J Stoltenberg	**6**	6	6
Q	**(United States) M Joyce**	**6**	**6**
6	(Netherlands) J Eltingh	4	3

Second round
1	**(Russia) Y Kafelnikov**	**6**	**6**
(Russia) A Volkov	1	2
Q	**(Japan) S Matsuoka**	**6**	**6**
(Russia) A Cherkasov	2	3
3	**(Switzerland) M Rosset**	**6**	**7**
(France) A Boetsch	2	5
**(France) C Pioline**	**6**	**6**
Q	(United States) M Joyce	3	3

Quarterfinals
1	**(Russia) Y Kafelnikov**	5	**6**	**6**
Q	(Japan) S Matsuoka	**7**	2	2
3	**(Switzerland) M Rosset**	**7**	6	**6**
(France) C Pioline	5	**7**	1

Semifinals
1	**(Russia) Y Kafelnikov**	**7**	**6**
3	(Switzerland) M Rosset	6	4

=== Bottom half ===
First round
**(United States) M Washington**	**6**	**6**
5	(Sweden) S Edberg	1	4
**(Chile) M Ríos**	**7**	**6**
Q	(Czech Republic) D Vacek	5	4
**(Italy) R Furlan**	6	**7**	**6**
LL	(Romania) A Voinea	**7**	5	0
4	**(Ukraine) A Medvedev**	**6**	**6**
(United States) R Reneberg	2	4
**(Slovakia) K Kučera**	4	**7**	**7**
8	(Sweden) J Björkman	**6**	6	6
**(Australia) T Woodbridge**	**6**	4	5
(Australia) M Woodforde	3	**6**	3^{r}
**(Netherlands) P Haarhuis**	2	**7**	**6**
Q	(Argentina) M Charpentier	**6**	5	3
**(Netherlands) J Siemerink**	**6**	2	**6**
2	(South Africa) W Ferreira	3	**6**	4

Second round
**(United States) M Washington**	**6**	**7**
(Chile) M Ríos	1	5
**(Italy) R Furlan**	**6**	**6**
4	(Ukraine) A Medvedev	4	0
(Slovakia) K Kučera	2	1
**(Australia) T Woodbridge**	**6**	**6**
(Netherlands) P Haarhuis	6	4
**(Netherlands) J Siemerink**	**7**	**6**

Quarterfinals
(United States) M Washington	4	**6**	2
**(Italy) R Furlan**	**6**	1	**6**
(Australia) T Woodbridge	4	2
**(Netherlands) J Siemerink**	**6**	**6**

Semifinals
(Italy) R Furlan	4	3
**(Netherlands) J Siemerink**	**6**	**6**
