= 1995 Club Colombia Open =

- Date: 11–17 September
- Edition: 2nd
- Category: World Series
- Draw: 32S / 16D
- Prize money: $303,000
- Surface: Clay / outdoor
- Location: Bogotá, Colombia
- Venue: Club Campestre El Rancho

Champions

Singles
- (Ecuador) Nicolás Lapentti

Doubles
- (Czech Republic) Jiří Novák / (Czech Republic) David Rikl
- Club Colombia Open

The 1995 Club Colombia Open was a men's professional tennis tournament played on outdoor clay courts at the Club Campestre El Rancho in Bogotá in Colombia and was part of the World Series category of the 1995 ATP Tour. It was the second edition of the tournament and was held from 11 September through 17 September 1995. Unseeded Nicolás Lapentti, who entered the main draw as a qualifier, won the singles title.

== Finals ==
=== Singles ===
(Ecuador) Nicolás Lapentti defeated (Colombia) Miguel Tobón 2–6, 6–1, 6–4

- It was Lapentti's onlys singles title of the year and the 1st of his career.

=== Doubles ===
(Czech Republic) Jiří Novák / (Czech Republic) David Rikl defeated (United States) Steve Campbell / (United States) MaliVai Washington 7–6, 6–2

- It was Novák's 1st doubles title of his career. It was Rikl's 1st doubles title of the year and the 8th of his career.
