= 1995 Muratti Time Indoor – Doubles =

Doubles
- 1995 Muratti Time Indoor

Final
- Champions: (Germany) Boris Becker (France) Guy Forget
- Runners-up: (Czech Republic) Petr Korda (Czech Republic) Karel Nováček
- Score: 6–2, 6–4

Details
- Draw: 16
- Seeds: 4

Events
Singles	Doubles
← 1994 ·	Milan Indoor	· 1996 →

Tom Nijssen and Cyril Suk were the defending champions, but competed this year with different partners. Nijssen teamed up with Menno Oosting and lost in the quarterfinals to Petr Korda and Karel Nováček, while Suk teamed up with Hendrik Jan Davids and lost in the semifinals to Boris Becker and Guy Forget.

Becker and Forget won the title by defeating Korda and Nováček 6–2, 6–4 in the final.

== Seeds ==
1. (Canada) Grant Connell / (United States) Patrick Galbraith (semifinals)
2. (France) Olivier Delaître / (Czech Republic) Daniel Vacek (first round)
3. (Netherlands) Tom Nijssen / (Netherlands) Menno Oosting (quarterfinals)
4. (South Africa) Gary Muller / (South Africa) Piet Norval (quarterfinals)

== Draw ==
=== Key ===
- Q = Qualifier
- WC = Wild card
- LL = Lucky loser
- Alt = Alternate
- ITF = ITF entry
- PR = Protected ranking
- SR = Special ranking
- SE = Special exempt
- JE = Junior exempt
- JR = Junior Accelerator Programme entrant
- CO = College Accelerator Programme entrant
- NG = Next Gen Accelerator Program entrant
- w/o = Walkover
- r = Retired
- d = Defaulted

=== Draw ===
First round
1	(Canada) G Connell (United States) P Galbraith	6	6	7
Q	(Austria) A Antonitsch (Germany) P Baur	1	7	6
WC	(Italy) C Brandi (Italy) S Pescosolido	2	7	6
(United States) K Kinnear (United States) D Wheaton	6	5	2
3	(Netherlands) T Nijssen (Netherlands) M Oosting	7	6
WC	(Italy) O Camporese (Italy) R Furlan	6	4
(Czech Republic) P Korda (Czech Republic) K Nováček	7	6
(Netherlands) S Noteboom (Spain) J Sánchez	6	2
(South Africa) L Bale (South Africa) JL de Jager	7	4	4
(Netherlands) HJ Davids (Czech Republic) C Suk	6	6	6
(Italy) F Mordegan (Belgium) L Pimek	6	2
4	(South Africa) G Muller (South Africa) P Norval	7	6
(Spain) T Carbonell (Spain) F Roig	1	6
WC	(Germany) B Becker (France) G Forget	6	7
(United States) M Keil (Sweden) P Nyborg	4	6	6
2	(France) O Delaître (Czech Republic) D Vacek	6	3	4

Quarterfinals
1	(Canada) G Connell (United States) P Galbraith	6	6
WC	(Italy) C Brandi (Italy) S Pescosolido	3	3
3	(Netherlands) T Nijssen (Netherlands) M Oosting	4	6	3
(Czech Republic) P Korda (Czech Republic) K Nováček	6	3	6
(Netherlands) HJ Davids (Czech Republic) C Suk	6	6	7
4	(South Africa) G Muller (South Africa) P Norval	7	3	6
WC	(Germany) B Becker (France) G Forget	6	6
(United States) M Keil (Sweden) P Nyborg	3	3

Semifinals
1	(Canada) G Connell (United States) P Galbraith	4	4
(Czech Republic) P Korda (Czech Republic) K Nováček	6	6
(Netherlands) HJ Davids (Czech Republic) C Suk	7	6	6
WC	(Germany) B Becker (France) G Forget	6	7	7

Final
(Czech Republic) P Korda (Czech Republic) K Nováček	2	4
WC	(Germany) B Becker (France) G Forget	6	6
