= 1995 Ordina Open =

- Date: 12–19 June
- Edition: 6th
- Category: ATP World Series
- Draw: 32S / 16D
- Prize money: $303,000
- Surface: Grass / outdoor
- Location: Rosmalen, Netherlands

Champions

Singles
- (Slovakia) Karol Kučera

Doubles
- (Netherlands) Richard Krajicek / (Netherlands) Jan Siemerink
- Ordina Open

The 1995 Ordina Open was a men's ATP tennis tournament held in Rosmalen, Netherlands and played on outdoor grass courts. The event was part of the World Series of the 1995 ATP Tour. It was the sixth edition of the tournament and was played from 12 June through 19 June 1995.

Sixth-seeded Karol Kučera won his first career singles title.

== Finals ==
=== Singles ===
(Slovakia) Karol Kučera defeated (Sweden) Anders Järryd, 7–6^{(9–7)}, 7–6^{(7–4)}

=== Doubles ===
(Netherlands) Richard Krajicek / (Netherlands) Jan Siemerink defeated (Netherlands) Hendrik Jan Davids / (Russia) Andrei Olhovskiy, 7–5, 6–3
