= 1995 U.S. Men's Clay Court Championships =

- Date: May 8–15
- Edition: 27th
- Category: World Series
- Draw: 32S / 16D
- Prize money: $264,250
- Surface: Clay / outdoor
- Location: Pinehurst, North Carolina, U.S.

Champions

Singles
- (Sweden) Thomas Enqvist

Doubles
- (Australia) Todd Woodbridge / (Australia) Mark Woodforde
← 1994 ·	U.S. Men's Clay Court Championships	· 1996 →

The 1995 U.S. Men's Clay Court Championships was an Association of Tennis Professionals tennis tournament held in Pinehurst, North Carolina in the United States. The event was part of the World Series of the 1995 ATP Tour. It was the 27th edition of the tournament and was held from May 8 through May 15, 1995. Thomas Enqvist won the singles title.

== Finals ==
=== Singles ===
(Sweden) Thomas Enqvist defeated (Argentina) Javier Frana 6–3, 3–6, 6–3

- It was Enqvist's 3rd title of the year and the 5th of his career.

=== Doubles ===
(Australia) Todd Woodbridge / (Australia) Mark Woodforde defeated (United States) Alex O'Brien / (Australia) Sandon Stolle 6–2, 6–4

- It was Woodbridge's 3rd title of the year and the 31st of his career. It was Woodforde's 3rd title of the year and the 35th of his career.
