= 1995 Rado Swiss Open =

- Date: 10–16 July
- Edition: 50th
- Category: World Series
- Draw: 32S / 16D
- Prize money: $525,000
- Surface: Clay / outdoor
- Location: Gstaad, Switzerland
- Venue: Roy Emerson Arena

Champions

Singles
- (Russia) Yevgeny Kafelnikov

Doubles
- (Argentina) Luis Lobo / (Spain) Javier Sánchez
- Swiss Open

The 1995 Rado Swiss Open was a men's professional tennis tournament played on outdoor clay courts at the Roy Emerson Arena in Gstaad, Switzerland and was part of the World Series category of the 1995 ATP Tour. It was the 50th edition of the tournament and was held from 10 July until 16 July 1995. Second-seeded Yevgeny Kafelnikov won the singles title.

== Finals ==
=== Singles ===
(Russia) Yevgeny Kafelnikov defeated (Switzerland) Jakob Hlasek 6–3, 6–4, 3–6, 6–3

- It was Kafelnikov's 3rd singles title of the year and the 6th of his career.

=== Doubles ===
(Argentina) Luis Lobo / (Spain) Javier Sánchez defeated (France) Arnaud Boetsch / (Switzerland) Marc Rosset 6–7, 7–6, 7–6

- It was Lobo's 1st doubles title of the year and the 2nd of his career. It was Sánchez' 1st doubles title of the year and the 18th of his career.
