= 1996 Italian Indoor – Singles =

Singles
- 1996 Italian Indoor

Final
- Champion: (Croatia) Goran Ivanišević
- Runner-up: (Switzerland) Marc Rosset
- Score: 6–3, 7–6^{(7–3)}

Details
- Draw: 32
- Seeds: 8

Events
Singles	Doubles
← 1995 ·	Italian Indoor	· 1997 →

Yevgeny Kafelnikov was the defending champion but lost in the semifinals to Marc Rosset.

Goran Ivanišević won in the final 6–3, 7–6^{(7–3)} against Rosset.

== Seeds ==
A champion seed is indicated in bold text while text in italics indicates the round in which that seed was eliminated.

1. (Austria) Thomas Muster (first round)
2. (Germany) Boris Becker (first round)
3. (Russia) Yevgeny Kafelnikov (semifinals)
4. (Croatia) **Goran Ivanišević (champion)**
5. (Spain) Sergi Bruguera (first round)
6. (Netherlands) Richard Krajicek (second round)
7. (Germany) Michael Stich (second round)
8. (Switzerland) Marc Rosset (final)

== Draw ==
=== Key ===
- Q = Qualifier
- WC = Wild card
- LL = Lucky loser
- Alt = Alternate
- SE = Special exempt
- PR = Protected ranking
- ITF = ITF entry
- JE = Junior exempt
- w/o = Walkover
- r = Retired
- d = Defaulted
- SR = Special ranking

First round
1	(Austria) T Muster	3	4
(Italy) **A Gaudenzi**	**6**	**6**
(Switzerland) J Hlasek	4	**6**	1
(Italy) **R Furlan**	**6**	3	**6**
(France) **A Boetsch**	**7^{7}**	**6**
Q	(Belgium) D Norman	6^{3}	3
(Czech Republic) M Damm	2	2
8	(Switzerland) **M Rosset**	**6**	**6**
3	(Russia) **Y Kafelnikov**	**7^{7}**	0	**6**
(Spain) J Burillo	6^{1}	**6**	2
WC	(Italy) **S Pescosolido**	6^{9}	**6**	**6**
Q	(Netherlands) F Wibier	**7^{11}**	4	4
WC	(Italy) D Nargiso	3	**6**	1
(Czech Republic) **D Vacek**	**6**	1	**6**
(Spain) A Berasategui	4	0
6	(Netherlands) **R Krajicek**	**6**	**6**
5	(Spain) S Bruguera	3	2
(Netherlands) **J Siemerink**	**6**	**6**
(Spain) J Sánchez	2	**7**	3
(Romania) **A Voinea**	**6**	5	**6**
(Spain) **F Clavet**	**6**	**7^{7}**
Q	(Haiti) R Agénor	0	6^{2}
(Germany) M Sinner	6^{5}	3
4	(Croatia) **G Ivanišević**	**7^{7}**	**6**
7	(Germany) **M Stich**	**6**	**6**
(Russia) A Volkov	3	4
WC	(France) **G Forget**	**6**	**6**
Q	(France) J Hanquez	3	4
(Germany) D Prinosil	6^{1}	5
(Ukraine) **A Medvedev**	**7^{7}**	**7**
(Czech Republic) **B Ulihrach**	**6**	**6**
2	(Germany) B Becker	4	2

Second round
(Italy) A Gaudenzi	1	2
(Italy) **R Furlan**	**6**	**6**
(France) A Boetsch	**6**	3	0
8	(Switzerland) **M Rosset**	3	**6**	**6**
3	(Russia) **Y Kafelnikov**	2	**6**	**6**
WC	(Italy) S Pescosolido	**6**	3	2
(Czech Republic) **D Vacek**	**6**	**6**
6	(Netherlands) R Krajicek	4	4
(Netherlands) J Siemerink	4	4
(Romania) **A Voinea**	**6**	**6**
(Spain) F Clavet	2	4
4	(Croatia) **G Ivanišević**	**6**	**6**
7	(Germany) M Stich
WC	(France) **G Forget**	w/o
(Ukraine) **A Medvedev**	3	**6**	**6**
(Czech Republic) B Ulihrach	**6**	4	1

Quarterfinals
(Italy) R Furlan	4	**6**	3
8	(Switzerland) **M Rosset**	**6**	3	**6**
3	(Russia) **Y Kafelnikov**	**6**	3	**6**
(Czech Republic) D Vacek	3	**6**	3
(Romania) A Voinea	6^{0}	1
4	(Croatia) **G Ivanišević**	**7^{7}**	**6**
WC	(France) **G Forget**	**6**	3	**7**
(Ukraine) A Medvedev	1	**6**	5

Semifinals
8	(Switzerland) **M Rosset**	4	**6**	**6**
3	(Russia) Y Kafelnikov	**6**	2	4
4	(Croatia) **G Ivanišević**	6^{1}	**6**	**7^{7}**
WC	(France) G Forget	**7^{7}**	3	6^{4}

Final
8	(Switzerland) Marc Rosset	3	6^{3}
4	(Croatia) **Goran Ivanišević**	**6**	**7^{7}**
