= 1996 Italian Indoor =

- Date: 26 February – 3 March
- Edition: 19th
- Category: Championship Series
- Draw: 32S / 16D
- Prize money: $698,250
- Surface: Carpet / indoor
- Location: Milan, Italy
- Venue: Palatrussardi

Champions

Singles
- (Croatia) Goran Ivanišević

Doubles
- (Italy) Andrea Gaudenzi / (Croatia) Goran Ivanišević
- Milan Indoor

The 1996 Italian Indoor was a men's tennis tournament played on indoor carpet courts at the Palatrussardi in Milan, Italy and was part of the Championship Series of the 1996 ATP Tour. The tournament ran from 26 February through 3 March 1996. Goran Ivanišević won the singles title.

== Finals ==
=== Singles ===
(Croatia) Goran Ivanišević defeated (Switzerland) Marc Rosset 6–3, 7–6^{(7–3)}

- It was Ivanišević's 3rd singles title of the year and the 15th of his career.

=== Doubles ===
(Italy) Andrea Gaudenzi / (Croatia) Goran Ivanišević defeated (France) Guy Forget / (Switzerland) Jakob Hlasek 6–4, 7–5

- It was Gaudenzi's only title of the year and the 1st of his career. It was Ivanišević's 4th title of the year and the 22nd of his career.
