= 1995 Waldbaum's Hamlet Cup =

- Date: August 21–27
- Edition: 15th
- Category: International Series
- Draw: 32S / 16D
- Prize money: $303,000
- Surface: Hard / outdoor
- Location: Long Island, United States

Champions

Singles
- (Russia) Yevgeny Kafelnikov

Doubles
- (Czech Republic) Cyril Suk / (Czech Republic) Daniel Vacek
- Waldbaum's Hamlet Cup

The 1995 Waldbaum's Hamlet Cup was a men's tennis tournament played on Hard courts in Long Island, United that was part of the International Series of the 1995 ATP Tour. It was the fifteenth edition of the tournament and was held from August 21 through August 27, 1995. First-seeded Yevgeny Kafelnikov won the singles title.

== Finals ==
=== Singles ===
(Russia) Yevgeny Kafelnikov defeated (Netherlands) Jan Siemerink, 7–6^{(7–0)}, 6–2

- It was Kafelnikov's 4th singles title of the year and the 7th of his career.

=== Doubles ===
(Czech Republic) Cyril Suk / (Czech Republic) Daniel Vacek defeated (United States) Rick Leach / (United States) Scott Melville, 5–7, 7–6, 7–6
