= 1995 Muratti Time Indoor =

- Date: 13–19 February
- Edition: 18th
- Category: Championship Series
- Draw: 32S / 16D
- Prize money: $689,250
- Surface: Carpet / indoor
- Location: Milan, Italy
- Venue: Assago Forum

Champions

Singles
- (Russia) Yevgeny Kafelnikov

Doubles
- (Germany) Boris Becker / (France) Guy Forget
- Milan Indoor

The 1995 Muratti Time Indoor was an ATP men's tennis tournament played on indoor carpet courts at the Assago Forum Milan, Italy that was part of the Championship Series of the 1995 ATP Tour. It was the 18th edition of the tournament and took place from 13 February until 19 February 1995. Fifth-seeded Yevgeny Kafelnikov won the singles title and earned $128,000 first-prize money.

== Finals ==
=== Singles ===
(Russia) Yevgeny Kafelnikov defeated (Germany) Boris Becker, 7–5, 5–7, 7–6^{(8–6)}

- It was Kafelnikov's 1st singles title of the year and the 4th of his career.

=== Doubles ===
(Germany) Boris Becker / (France) Guy Forget defeated (Czech Republic) Petr Korda / (Czech Republic) Karel Nováček, 6–2, 6–4
