= 1995 Muratti Time Indoor – Singles =

Singles
- 1995 Muratti Time Indoor

Final
- Champion: (Russia) Yevgeny Kafelnikov
- Runner-up: (Germany) Boris Becker
- Score: 7–5, 5–7, 7–6^{(8–6)}

Details
- Draw: 32 (2WC/4Q/1LL)
- Seeds: 8

Events
Singles	Doubles
← 1994 ·	Milan Indoor	· 1996 →

Boris Becker was the defending champion, but lost in the final to Yevgeny Kafelnikov. The score was 7–5, 5–7, 7–6^{(8–6)}.

== Seeds ==
1. (Germany) Boris Becker (final)
2. (Croatia) Goran Ivanišević (semifinals)
3. (Spain) Alberto Berasategui (second round)
4. (Germany) Michael Stich (quarterfinals)
5. (Russia) Yevgeny Kafelnikov (champion)
6. (Czech Republic) Petr Korda (semifinals)
7. (Australia) Jason Stoltenberg (first round)
8. (Spain) Àlex Corretja (first round)

== Draw ==
=== Key ===
- Q = Qualifier
- WC = Wild card
- LL = Lucky loser
- Alt = Alternate
- ITF = ITF entry
- PR = Protected ranking
- SR = Special ranking
- SE = Special exempt
- JE = Junior exempt
- JR = Junior Accelerator Programme entrant
- CO = College Accelerator Programme entrant
- NG = Next Gen Accelerator Program entrant
- w/o = Walkover
- r = Retired
- d = Defaulted

=== Finals ===
Semifinals
1	(Germany) Boris Becker	7^{7}	6^{3}	6
6	(Czech Republic) Petr Korda	6^{3}	7^{7}	2
5	(Russia) Yevgeny Kafelnikov	7	6^{4}	6
2/WC	(Croatia) Goran Ivanišević	5	7^{7}	4

Final
1	(Germany) Boris Becker	5	7	6^{6}
5	(Russia) Yevgeny Kafelnikov	7	5	7^{8}

=== Top half ===
First round
1	(Germany) B Becker	6	7^{7}
Q	(Switzerland) L Manta	3	6^{5}
(France) F Santoro	1	6^{5}
Q	(Haiti) R Agénor	6	7^{7}
(Spain) F Clavet	4	5
(France) G Forget	6	7
(Russia) A Volkov	6	7
7	(Australia) J Stoltenberg	2	5
3	(Spain) A Berasategui	7^{14}	3	6
(United States) D Wheaton	6^{12}	6	4
(Spain) A Costa	4	5
(Czech Republic) S Doseděl	6	7
(Germany) M Zoecke	5	3
(Spain) T Carbonell	7	6
Q	(Netherlands) JH Davids	7^{7}	2	3
6	(Czech Republic) P Korda	6^{3}	6	6

Second round
1	(Germany) B Becker	6	6
Q	(Haiti) R Agénor	4	4
(France) G Forget	4	7^{7}	6
(Russia) A Volkov	6	6^{3}	4
3	(Spain) A Berasategui	7^{7}	2	4
(Czech Republic) S Doseděl	6^{4}	6	6
(Spain) T Carbonell	6^{7}	3
6	(Czech Republic) P Korda	7^{9}	6

Quarterfinals
1	(Germany) B Becker	7	6
(France) G Forget	5	2
(Czech Republic) S Doseděl	4	3
6	(Czech Republic) P Korda	6	6

Semifinals
1	(Germany) B Becker	7^{7}	6^{3}	6
6	(Czech Republic) P Korda	6^{3}	7^{7}	2

=== Bottom half ===
First round
5	(Russia) Y Kafelnikov	6	6
(Czech Republic) K Nováček	4	2
WC	(Italy) O Camporese	5	6	3
(Slovakia) K Kučera	7	4	6
WC	(Italy) S Pescosolido	6^{4}	1
(Germany) K Braasch	7^{7}	6
Q	(Italy) G Pozzi	1	5
4	(Germany) M Stich	6	7
8	(Spain) À Corretja	3	6	1
(France) O Delaître	6	4	6
LL	(Czech Republic) R Vašek	6^{3}	2
(Italy) R Furlan	7^{7}	6
(Spain) J Sánchez	4	3
(France) C Pioline	6	6
(Czech Republic) D Vacek	6^{4}	6^{5}
2/WC	(Croatia) G Ivanišević	7^{7}	7^{7}

Second round
5	(Russia) Y Kafelnikov	w/o
(Slovakia) K Kučera
(Germany) K Braasch	3	6^{3}
4	(Germany) M Stich	6	7^{7}
(France) O Delaître	7^{7}	6
(Italy) R Furlan	6^{5}	2
(France) C Pioline	6^{11}	4
2/WC	(Croatia) G Ivanišević	7^{13}	6

Quarterfinals
5	(Russia) Y Kafelnikov	7^{7}	4	6
4	(Germany) M Stich	6^{4}	6	0
(France) O Delaître	3	3
2/WC	(Croatia) G Ivanišević	6	6

Semifinals
5	(Russia) Y Kafelnikov	7	6^{4}	6
2/WC	(Croatia) G Ivanišević	5	7^{7}	4
