= 1995 U.S. Men's Clay Court Championships – Singles =

Singles
- 1995 U.S. Men's Clay Court Championships

Final
- Champion: (Sweden) Thomas Enqvist
- Runner-up: (Argentina) Javier Frana
- Score: 6–3, 3–6, 6–3

Details
- Draw: 32
- Seeds: 8

Events
Singles	Doubles
- U.S. Men's Clay Court Championships

Jason Stoltenberg was the defending champion, but lost in the second round this year.

Thomas Enqvist won the title, defeating Javier Frana 6–3, 3–6, 6–3 in the final.

== Seeds ==
A champion seed is indicated in bold text while text in italics indicates the round in which that seed was eliminated.

1. (Sweden) Magnus Larsson (semifinals)
2. (Sweden) **Thomas Enqvist (champion)**
3. (Australia) Jason Stoltenberg (second round)
4. (United States) David Wheaton (semifinals)
5. N/A
6. (Australia) Mark Woodforde (first round)
7. (United States) Chuck Adams (first round)
8. (United States) Jared Palmer (quarterfinals)

== Draw ==
Key

- Q = Qualifier
- WC = Wild card
- LL = Lucky loser
- Alt = Alternate
- ITF = ITF entry
- PR = Protected ranking
- SR = Special ranking
- SE = Special exempt
- JE = Junior exempt
- JR = Junior Accelerator Programme entrant
- CO = College Accelerator Programme entrant
- NG = Next Gen Accelerator Program entrant
- w/o = Walkover
- r = Retired
- d = Defaulted

First round
1	(Sweden) **M Larsson**	**6**	**6**
(New Zealand) B Steven	2	3
(Australia) M Tebbutt	**6**	4	6^{6}
(Venezuela) **N Pereira**	4	**6**	**7^{8}**
(Czech Republic) R Vašek	**6**	4	6^{2}
(Canada) **G Rusedski**	4	**6**	**7^{7}**
Q	(South Africa) G Stafford	**7**	3	5
WC/8	(United States) **J Palmer**	5	**6**	**7**
3	(Australia) **J Stoltenberg**	**6**	**7^{7}**
(Australia) T Woodbridge	0	6^{3}
WC	(Australia) P Cash	2	0
(Argentina) **J Frana**	**6**	**6**
(Switzerland) **J Hlasek**	**7^{9}**	**6**
Q	(Spain) J A Viloca	6^{7}	1
(Germany) K Braasch	3	4
LL	(Argentina) **G Etlis**	**6**	**6**
6	(Australia) M Woodforde	**6**	6^{5}	4
(France) **G Raoux**	2	**7^{7}**	**6**
(Sweden) M Wilander	2	2
(Spain) **J Arrese**	**6**	**6**
Q	(Austria) A Antonitsch	2	1
(United States) **P McEnroe**	**6**	**6**
WC	(United States) D Johnson	1	**7**	3
4	(United States) **D Wheaton**	**6**	5	**6**
7	(United States) C Adams	2	1
(Brazil) **F Meligeni**	**6**	**6**
(Australia) J Morgan	2	3
Q	(United States) **S Bryan**	**6**	**6**
(United States) **R Reneberg**	**6**	**6**
(Spain) E Sánchez	4	4
(France) L Roux	4	5
2	(Sweden) **T Enqvist**	**6**	**7**

Second round
1	(Sweden) **M Larsson**	**6**	**6**
(Venezuela) N Pereira	2	3
(Canada) G Rusedski	4	6^{5}
WC/8	(United States) **J Palmer**	**6**	**7^{7}**
3	(Australia) J Stoltenberg	**6**	2	4
(Argentina) **J Frana**	2	**6**	**6**
(Switzerland) **J Hlasek**	**6**	**6**
LL	(Argentina) G Etlis	3	4
(France) G Raoux	6^{3}	6^{5}
(Spain) **J Arrese**	**7^{7}**	**7^{7}**
(United States) P McEnroe	**6**	3	3
4	(United States) **D Wheaton**	3	**6**	**6**
(Brazil) **F Meligeni**	**6**	**6**
Q	(United States) S Bryan	2	4
(United States) R Reneberg	6^{4}	**6**	2
2	(Sweden) **T Enqvist**	**7^{7}**	3	**6**

Quarterfinals
1	(Sweden) **M Larsson**	6^{5}	**7^{7}**	**7^{8}**
WC/8	(United States) J Palmer	**7^{7}**	6^{2}	6^{6}
(Argentina) **J Frana**	6^{3}	**7**	**6**
(Switzerland) J Hlasek	**7^{7}**	5	4
(Spain) J Arrese	4	3
4	(United States) **D Wheaton**	**6**	**6**
(Brazil) F Meligeni	2	1
2	(Sweden) **T Enqvist**	**6**	**6**

Semifinals
1	(Sweden) M Larsson	4	**6**	3
(Argentina) **J Frana**	**6**	4	**6**
4	(United States) D Wheaton	5	4
2	(Sweden) **T Enqvist**	**7**	**6**

Final
(Argentina) Javier Frana	3	**6**	3
2	(Sweden) **Thomas Enqvist**	**6**	3	**6**
