= 1995 Waldbaum's Hamlet Cup – Doubles =

Doubles
- 1995 Waldbaum's Hamlet Cup

Final
- Champions: (Czech Republic) Cyril Suk (Czech Republic) Daniel Vacek
- Runners-up: (United States) Rick Leach (United States) Scott Melville
- Score: 5–7, 7–6, 7–6

Details
- Draw: 16
- Seeds: 4

Events
Singles	men	women
Doubles	men	women
- Waldbaum's Hamlet Cup

The 1998 Waldbaum's Hamlet Cup was a men's tennis tournament played on Hard courts in Long Island, United that was part of the International Series of the 1995 ATP Tour. It was the tenth edition of the tournament and was held from 21–27 August 1998.

== Seeds ==
Champion seeds are indicated in bold text while text in italics indicates the round in which those seeds were eliminated.

1. (Netherlands) Jacco Eltingh / (Netherlands) Paul Haarhuis (semifinals)
2. (United States) Jared Palmer / (United States) Richey Reneberg (first round)
3. (Czech Republic) **Cyril Suk** / (Czech Republic) **Daniel Vacek (champions)**
4. (United States) Rick Leach / (United States) Scott Melville (final)

== Draw ==
Key

- Q = Qualifier
- WC = Wild card
- LL = Lucky loser
- Alt = Alternate
- ITF = ITF entry
- PR = Protected ranking
- SR = Special ranking
- SE = Special exempt
- JE = Junior exempt
- JR = Junior Accelerator Programme entrant
- CO = College Accelerator Programme entrant
- NG = Next Gen Accelerator Program entrant
- w/o = Walkover
- r = Retired
- d = Defaulted

=== Finals ===
First round
1	(Netherlands) **J Eltingh** **(Netherlands) P Haarhuis**	**7**	**6**
(United States) M Keil (Sweden) P Nyborg	5	1
(Czech Republic) **M Damm** **(Czech Republic) K Nováček**	**7**	**6**
(France) O Delaître (Australia) A Kratzmann	5	2
3	(Czech Republic) **C Suk** **(Czech Republic) D Vacek**	**7**	**7**
(Germany) M-K Goellner (Australia) M Philippoussis	6	6
(United States) **L Jensen** **(United States) M Jensen**	**6**	5	**6**
(Netherlands) T Nijssen (Czech Republic) L Pimek	3	**7**	4
(Spain) **J Burillo** **(Spain) À Corretja**	**7**	**6**
(Netherlands) R Krajicek (Netherlands) J Siemerink	5	2
4	(United States) **R Leach** **(United States) S Melville**	**6**	**6**
(United States) F Montana (United States) G Van Emburgh	3	2
(Spain) **S Casal** **(Spain) E Sánchez**	2	**6**	**6**
(Czech Republic) P Korda (Ukraine) A Medvedev	**6**	3	4
(United States) **S Cannon** **(Australia) M Tebbutt**	5	**7**	**6**
2	(United States) J Palmer (United States) R Reneberg	**7**	6	0

Quarterfinals
1	(Netherlands) **J Eltingh** **(Netherlands) P Haarhuis**	**6**	**6**
(Czech Republic) M Damm (Czech Republic) K Nováček	2	2
3	(Czech Republic) **C Suk** **(Czech Republic) D Vacek**	**6**	**6**
(United States) L Jensen (United States) M Jensen	3	2
(Spain) J Burillo (Spain) À Corretja	6	**7**	5
4	(United States) **R Leach** **(United States) S Melville**	**7**	6	**7**
(Spain) S Casal (Spain) E Sánchez	**6**	6	3
(United States) **S Cannon** **(Australia) M Tebbutt**	4	**7**	**6**

Semifinals
1	(Netherlands) J Eltingh (Netherlands) P Haarhuis	5	**6**	2
3	(Czech Republic) **C Suk** **(Czech Republic) D Vacek**	**7**	2	**6**
4	(United States) **R Leach** **(United States) S Melville**	**6**	**6**
(United States) S Cannon (Australia) M Tebbutt	3	3

Final
3	(Czech Republic) **C Suk** **(Czech Republic) D Vacek**	5	**7**	**7**
4	(United States) R Leach (United States) S Melville	**7**	6	6
