= 1995 Ordina Open – Doubles =

Doubles
- 1995 Ordina Open

Final
- Champions: (Netherlands) Richard Krajicek (Netherlands) Jan Siemerink
- Runners-up: (Netherlands) Hendrik Jan Davids (Russia) Andrei Olhovskiy
- Score: 7–5, 6–3

Details
- Draw: 16
- Seeds: 4

Events
Singles	Doubles
- Ordina Open

Stephen Noteboom and Fernon Wibier were the defending champions, but lost in the first round to Alex O'Brien and Richey Reneberg.

Richard Krajicek and Jan Siemerink won the title by defeating Hendrik Jan Davids and Andrei Olhovskiy 7–5, 6–3 in the final.

== Seeds ==
1. (Netherlands) Jacco Eltingh / (Netherlands) Paul Haarhuis (semifinals)
2. (United States) Alex O'Brien / (United States) Richey Reneberg (semifinals)
3. (Netherlands) Hendrik Jan Davids / (Russia) Andrei Olhovskiy (final)
4. (South Africa) David Adams / (Netherlands) Tom Nijssen (first round)

== Draw ==
Key

- Q = Qualifier
- WC = Wild card
- LL = Lucky loser
- Alt = Alternate
- ITF = ITF entry
- PR = Protected ranking
- SR = Special ranking
- SE = Special exempt
- JE = Junior exempt
- JR = Junior Accelerator Programme entrant
- CO = College Accelerator Programme entrant
- NG = Next Gen Accelerator Program entrant
- w/o = Walkover
- r = Retired
- d = Defaulted

=== Draw ===
First round
1	(Netherlands) J Eltingh (Netherlands) P Haarhuis	3	6	6
(Italy) D Nargiso (Venezuela) N Pereira	6	4	3
(Australia) A Kratzmann (Australia) W Masur	7	6
WC	(Israel) E Erlich (Switzerland) F Veglio	6	4
4	(South Africa) D Adams (Netherlands) T Nijssen	6	6
(Sweden) H Holm (France) G Raoux	7	7
WC	(Netherlands) R Krajicek (Netherlands) J Siemerink	7	7
(Japan) S Matsuoka (Kenya) P Wekesa	5	5
WC	(Netherlands) S Schalken (Netherlands) D van Scheppingen	6	3
(Australia) J Fitzgerald (Sweden) A Järryd	7	6
Q	(Germany) P Baur (Germany) A Thoms	4	6
3	(Netherlands) HJ Davids (Russia) A Olhovskiy	6	7
(Netherlands) T Kempers (Australia) S Youl	3	6
(Belgium) D Norman (Belgium) L Pimek	6	7
(Netherlands) S Noteboom (Netherlands) F Wibier	4	4
2	(United States) A O'Brien (United States) R Reneberg	6	6

Quarterfinals
1	(Netherlands) J Eltingh (Netherlands) P Haarhuis	6	6
(Australia) A Kratzmann (Australia) W Masur	3	0
(Sweden) H Holm (France) G Raoux	3	1
WC	(Netherlands) R Krajicek (Netherlands) J Siemerink	6	6
(Australia) J Fitzgerald (Sweden) A Järryd	0	6
3	(Netherlands) HJ Davids (Russia) A Olhovskiy	6	7
(Belgium) D Norman (Belgium) L Pimek	3	6
2	(United States) A O'Brien (United States) R Reneberg	6	7

Semifinals
1	(Netherlands) J Eltingh (Netherlands) P Haarhuis	6	4
WC	(Netherlands) R Krajicek (Netherlands) J Siemerink	7	6
3	(Netherlands) HJ Davids (Russia) A Olhovskiy	6	6	7
2	(United States) A O'Brien (United States) R Reneberg	7	1	6

Final
WC	(Netherlands) R Krajicek (Netherlands) J Siemerink	7	6
3	(Netherlands) HJ Davids (Russia) A Olhovskiy	5	3
