= 1995 U.S. Men's Clay Court Championships – Doubles =

Doubles
- 1995 U.S. Men's Clay Court Championships

Final
- Champions: (Australia) Todd Woodbridge (Australia) Mark Woodforde
- Runners-up: (United States) Alex O'Brien (Australia) Sandon Stolle
- Score: 6–2, 6–4

Details
- Draw: 16
- Seeds: 4

Events
Singles	Doubles
- U.S. Men's Clay Court Championships

Todd Woodbridge and Mark Woodforde won the title, defeating Alex O'Brien and Sandon Stolle 6–2, 6–4 in the final.

== Seeds ==
1. (Australia) Todd Woodbridge / (Australia) Mark Woodforde (champions)
2. (United States) Alex O'Brien / (Australia) Sandon Stolle (final)
3. (Spain) Sergio Casal / (Spain) Emilio Sánchez (first round)
4. (Switzerland) Jakob Hlasek / (New Zealand) Brett Steven (semifinals)

== Draw ==
Key

- Q = Qualifier
- WC = Wild card
- LL = Lucky loser
- Alt = Alternate
- ITF = ITF entry
- PR = Protected ranking
- SR = Special ranking
- SE = Special exempt
- JE = Junior exempt
- JR = Junior Accelerator Programme entrant
- CO = College Accelerator Programme entrant
- NG = Next Gen Accelerator Program entrant
- w/o = Walkover
- r = Retired
- d = Defaulted

=== Draw ===
First round
1	(Australia) T Woodbridge (Australia) M Woodforde	6	6
(United States) K Kinnear (United States) D Wheaton	3	4
WC	(United States) D Flach (United States) TJ Middleton	6	2	2
(France) G Raoux (United Kingdom) G Rusedski	4	6	6
3	(Spain) S Casal (Spain) E Sánchez	6	6
Q	(United States) B Garnett (Australia) M Tebbutt	7	7
(United States) D Randall (United States) G Van Emburgh	6	6	7
(United States) L Jensen (South Africa) B Talbot	4	7	6
(Austria) A Antonitsch (United States) J Waite	6	1	6
WC	(United States) K Flach (United States) R Seguso	4	6	3
WC	(Sweden) T Enqvist (Sweden) M Larsson	1	7	2
4	(Switzerland) J Hlasek (New Zealand) B Steven	6	6	6
(United States) K Jones (United States) D Pate	6	6	6
(Spain) J Arrese (Argentina) D Orsanic	0	7	7
(United States) D Johnson (United States) K Thorne	4	6	6
2	(United States) A O'Brien (Australia) S Stolle	6	3	7

Quarterfinals
1	(Australia) T Woodbridge (Australia) M Woodforde	6	7
(France) G Raoux (United Kingdom) G Rusedski	4	6
Q	(United States) B Garnett (Australia) M Tebbutt	2	6	6
(United States) D Randall (United States) G Van Emburgh	6	1	4
(Austria) A Antonitsch (United States) J Waite	3	4
4	(Switzerland) J Hlasek (New Zealand) B Steven	6	6
(Spain) J Arrese (Argentina) D Orsanic	3	4
2	(United States) A O'Brien (Australia) S Stolle	6	6

Semifinals
1	(Australia) T Woodbridge (Australia) M Woodforde	6	6
Q	(United States) B Garnett (Australia) M Tebbutt	2	2
4	(Switzerland) J Hlasek (New Zealand) B Steven	3	6	3
2	(United States) A O'Brien (Australia) S Stolle	6	4	6

Final
1	(Australia) T Woodbridge (Australia) M Woodforde	6	6
2	(United States) A O'Brien (Australia) S Stolle	2	4
