= 1996 Italian Indoor – Doubles =

Doubles
- 1996 Italian Indoor

Final
- Champions: (Italy) Andrea Gaudenzi (Croatia) Goran Ivanišević
- Runners-up: (France) Guy Forget (Switzerland) Jakob Hlasek
- Score: 6–4, 7–5

Details
- Draw: 16
- Seeds: 4

Events
Singles	Doubles
- Italian Indoor

1996 Italian Indoor, Boris Becker and Guy Forget were the defending champions but only Forget competed that year with Jakob Hlasek.

Forget and Hlasek lost in the final 6–4, 7–5 against Andrea Gaudenzi and Goran Ivanišević.

== Seeds ==
1. (Czech Republic) Cyril Suk / (Czech Republic) Daniel Vacek (first round)
2. (France) Guy Forget / (Switzerland) Jakob Hlasek (final)
3. (Russia) Yevgeny Kafelnikov / (Netherlands) Menno Oosting (semifinals)
4. (South Africa) Ellis Ferreira / (Netherlands) Jan Siemerink (first round)

== Draw ==
Key

- Q = Qualifier
- WC = Wild card
- LL = Lucky loser
- Alt = Alternate
- ITF = ITF entry
- PR = Protected ranking
- SR = Special ranking
- SE = Special exempt
- JE = Junior exempt
- JR = Junior Accelerator Programme entrant
- CO = College Accelerator Programme entrant
- NG = Next Gen Accelerator Program entrant
- w/o = Walkover
- r = Retired
- d = Defaulted

First round
1	(Czech Republic) C Suk (Czech Republic) D Vacek	2	6	6
WC	(Italy) R Furlan (Italy) S Pescosolido	6	1	7
(South Africa) D Adams (Netherlands) H J Davids	7	7
(Czech Republic) M Damm (Germany) D Prinosil	5	5
4	(South Africa) E Ferreira (Netherlands) J Siemerink	2	7	3
(Italy) A Gaudenzi (Croatia) G Ivanišević	6	6	6
(Belgium) L Pimek (South Africa) B Talbot	7	6
LL	(Belgium) D Norman (Netherlands) F Wibier	6	4
(Australia) W Arthurs (Australia) A Kratzmann	6	6	6
(United Kingdom) N Broad (South Africa) P Norval	7	4	4
Q	(Italy) N Bruno (Romania) A Voinea	4	6	3
3	(Russia) Y Kafelnikov (Netherlands) M Oosting	6	4	6
WC	(France) A Boetsch (Switzerland) M Rosset	7	5	1
(South Africa) J-L de Jager (South Africa) G Muller	6	7	6
(South Africa) L Bale (South Africa) B Haygarth	6	4
2	(France) G Forget (Switzerland) J Hlasek	7	6

Quarterfinals
WC	(Italy) R Furlan (Italy) S Pescosolido	3	6
(South Africa) D Adams (Netherlands) H J Davids	6	7
(Italy) A Gaudenzi (Croatia) G Ivanišević	7	6
(Belgium) L Pimek (South Africa) B Talbot	6	3
(Australia) W Arthurs (Australia) A Kratzmann	4	3
3	(Russia) Y Kafelnikov (Netherlands) M Oosting	6	6
(South Africa) J-L de Jager (South Africa) G Muller	4	4
2	(France) G Forget (Switzerland) J Hlasek	6	6

Semifinals
(South Africa) D Adams (Netherlands) H J Davids	2	6	4
(Italy) A Gaudenzi (Croatia) G Ivanišević	6	3	6
3	(Russia) Y Kafelnikov (Netherlands) M Oosting	5	4
2	(France) G Forget (Switzerland) J Hlasek	7	6

Final
(Italy) A Gaudenzi (Croatia) G Ivanišević	6	7
2	(France) G Forget (Switzerland) J Hlasek	4	5
