= 1995 Ordina Open – Singles =

Singles
- 1995 Ordina Open

Final
- Champion: (Slovakia) Karol Kučera
- Runner-up: (Sweden) Anders Järryd
- Score: 7–6^{(9–7)}, 7–6^{(7–4)}

Details
- Draw: 32
- Seeds: 8

Events
Singles	Doubles
- Ordina Open

Richard Krajicek was the defending champion, but lost in the quarterfinals this year.

Karol Kučera won the tournament, beating Anders Järryd in the final, 7–6^{(9–7)}, 7–6^{(7–4)}.

== Seeds ==
1. (Netherlands) Richard Krajicek (quarterfinals)
2. (Netherlands) Jacco Eltingh (second round)
3. (Netherlands) Paul Haarhuis (quarterfinals)
4. (United States) Richey Reneberg (quarterfinals)
5. (New Zealand) Brett Steven (semifinals, retired)
6. (Slovakia) Karol Kučera (champion)
7. (Netherlands) Jan Siemerink (second round)
8. (France) Cédric Pioline (second round)

== Draw ==
Key

- Q = Qualifier
- WC = Wild card
- LL = Lucky loser
- Alt = Alternate
- ITF = ITF entry
- PR = Protected ranking
- SR = Special ranking
- SE = Special exempt
- JE = Junior exempt
- JR = Junior Accelerator Programme entrant
- CO = College Accelerator Programme entrant
- NG = Next Gen Accelerator Program entrant
- w/o = Walkover
- r = Retired
- d = Defaulted

=== Finals ===
Semifinals
(Sweden) Anders Järryd	6	3
5	(New Zealand) Brett Steven	3	1^{r}
6	(Slovakia) Karol Kučera	4	6	6
(Sweden) Henrik Holm	6	3	2

Final
(Sweden) Anders Järryd	6^{7}	6^{4}
6	(Slovakia) Karol Kučera	7^{9}	7^{7}

=== Top half ===
First round
1	(Netherlands) R Krajicek	4	6	7^{7}
(Japan) S Matsuoka	6	3	6^{3}
Q	(Netherlands) T Kempers	6	6^{5}	2
(United States) A O'Brien	4	7^{7}	6
(Sweden) A Järryd	7^{9}	6
WC	(Netherlands) H Jan Davids	6^{7}	2
(Germany) J Renzenbrink	4	3
7	(Netherlands) J Siemerink	6	6
4	(United States) R Reneberg	7^{7}	2	6
(France) G Raoux	6^{5}	6	1
(Russia) A Olhovskiy	6	6
Q	(Germany) P Baur	2	4
Q	(Belgium) D Norman	6	6
(Netherlands) S Schalken	0	4
(Germany) K Braasch	6^{2}	4
5	(New Zealand) B Steven	7^{7}	6

Second round
1	(Netherlands) R Krajicek	6	6
(United States) A O'Brien	3	3
(Sweden) A Järryd	6	6^{3}	7^{7}
7	(Netherlands) J Siemerink	4	7^{7}	6^{5}
4	(United States) R Reneberg	3	6	6
(Russia) A Olhovskiy	6	1	1
Q	(Belgium) D Norman	5	4
5	(New Zealand) B Steven	7	6

Quarterfinals
1	(Netherlands) R Krajicek	4	2
(Sweden) A Järryd	6	6
4	(United States) R Reneberg	3	1
5	(New Zealand) B Steven	6	6

Semifinals
(Sweden) A Järryd	6	3
5	(New Zealand) B Steven	3	1^{r}

=== Bottom half ===
First round
6	(Slovakia) K Kučera	3	6	6
WC	(Israel) E Erlich	6	4	0
(Germany) A Thoms	6	7
(Spain) J Burillo	1	5
(France) H Leconte	6	7^{7}
(Slovakia) J Krošlák	3	6^{5}
(Venezuela) N Pereira	6	6^{4}	3
3	(Netherlands) P Haarhuis	2	7^{7}	6
8	(France) C Pioline	7^{7}	6
WC	(Netherlands) R Wassen	6^{3}	4
Q	(Netherlands) F Wibier	6^{6}	6^{0}
(Sweden) H Holm	7^{8}	7^{7}
(Kenya) P Wekesa	2	1
(Italy) D Nargiso	6	6
(Australia) W Masur	2	4
2	(Netherlands) J Eltingh	6	6

Second round
6	(Slovakia) K Kučera	7^{7}	7
(Germany) A Thoms	6^{3}	5
(France) H Leconte	7^{7}	3	2
3	(Netherlands) P Haarhuis	6^{5}	6	6
8	(France) C Pioline	5	6^{4}
(Sweden) H Holm	7	7^{7}
(Italy) D Nargiso	7^{7}	6
2	(Netherlands) J Eltingh	6^{5}	4

Quarterfinals
6	(Slovakia) K Kučera	6	6
3	(Netherlands) P Haarhuis	3	2
(Sweden) H Holm	6	6
(Italy) D Nargiso	4	4

Semifinals
6	(Slovakia) K Kučera	4	6	6
(Sweden) H Holm	6	3	2
