= 1999 Majorca Open – Doubles =

Doubles
- 1999 Majorca Open

Final
- Champions: (Argentina) Lucas Arnold Ker (Spain) Tomás Carbonell
- Runners-up: (Spain) Alberto Berasategui (Spain) Francisco Roig
- Score: 6–1, 6–4

Details
- Draw: 16
- Seeds: 4

Events
Singles	Doubles
← 1998 ·	Majorca Open	· 2000 →

Pablo Albano and Daniel Orsanic were the defending champions, but did not participate together this year. Albano did not participate this year. Orsanic partnered Jaime Oncins, losing in the quarterfinals.

Lucas Arnold Ker and Tomás Carbonell won in the final 6–1, 6–4, against Alberto Berasategui and Francisco Roig.

== Seeds ==
1. (Brazil) Jaime Oncins / (Argentina) Daniel Orsanic (quarterfinals)
2. (Argentina) Lucas Arnold Ker / (Spain) Tomás Carbonell (champions)
3. (Spain) Alberto Martín / (Spain) Javier Sánchez (first round)
4. (Italy) Massimo Bertolini / (Argentina) Martín Rodríguez (first round)

== Draw ==
=== Key ===
- Q = Qualifier
- WC = Wild card
- LL = Lucky loser
- Alt = Alternate
- ITF = ITF entry
- PR = Protected ranking
- SR = Special ranking
- SE = Special exempt
- JE = Junior exempt
- JR = Junior Accelerator Programme entrant
- CO = College Accelerator Programme entrant
- NG = Next Gen Accelerator Program entrant
- w/o = Walkover
- r = Retired
- d = Defaulted

=== Draw ===
First round
1	(Brazil) J Oncins (Argentina) D Orsanic	6^{1}	6	7
WC	(Spain) G Blanco (Costa Rica) JA Marín	7^{7}	4	5
WC	(Spain) F López (Spain) M Marco Ripoll	2	3
(Spain) A Berasategui (Spain) F Roig	6	6
4	(Italy) M Bertolini (Argentina) M Rodríguez	4	6^{5}
(Spain) E Nicolás (Spain) G Puentes	6	7^{7}
(Spain) J Alonso (Spain) J Balcells	7	6
(Germany) J Knippschild (Germany) D Prinosil	5	4
(Israel) N Behr (Israel) E Ran	1	6^{2}
(Spain) JI Carrasco (Spain) J Velasco Jr.	6	7^{7}
Q	(Spain) O Burrieza-Lopez (Slovakia) D Hrbatý	6	7^{7}
3	(Spain) A Martín (Spain) J Sánchez	1	6^{2}
(Spain) Á Calatrava (Spain) A Portas	3	4
(Germany) M Hilpert (South Africa) V Snyman	6	6
WC	(Spain) C Costa (Spain) T Robredo	3	3
2	(Argentina) L Arnold Ker (Spain) T Carbonell	6	6

Quarterfinals
1	(Brazil) J Oncins (Argentina) D Orsanic	7	4	3
(Spain) A Berasategui (Spain) F Roig	5	6	6
(Spain) E Nicolás (Spain) G Puentes	4	4
(Spain) J Alonso (Spain) J Balcells	6	6
(Spain) JI Carrasco (Spain) J Velasco Jr.	7	6
Q	(Spain) O Burrieza-Lopez (Slovakia) D Hrbatý	5	4
(Germany) M Hilpert (South Africa) V Snyman	5	4
2	(Argentina) L Arnold Ker (Spain) T Carbonell	7	6

Semifinals
(Spain) A Berasategui (Spain) F Roig	7	6^{8}	6
(Spain) J Alonso (Spain) J Balcells	5	7^{10}	2
(Spain) JI Carrasco (Spain) J Velasco Jr.	4	2
2	(Argentina) L Arnold Ker (Spain) T Carbonell	6	6

Final
(Spain) A Berasategui (Spain) F Roig	1	4
2	(Argentina) L Arnold Ker (Spain) T Carbonell	6	6
