= 1997 Marbella Open – Doubles =

Tennis tournament

Doubles
- 1997 Marbella Open

Final
- Champions: (Morocco) Karim Alami (Spain) Julián Alonso
- Runners-up: (Spain) Alberto Berasategui (Spain) Jordi Burillo
- Score: 4–6, 6–3, 6–0

Details
- Draw: 16
- Seeds: 4

Events
Singles	Doubles
← 1996 ·	Marbella Open	· 1998 →

Andrew Kratzmann and Jack Waite were the defending champions, but did not participate together this year. Kratzmann partnered Libor Pimek, losing in the quarterfinals. Waite did not participate this year.

Karim Alami and Julián Alonso won in the final 4–6, 6–3, 6–0, against Alberto Berasategui and Jordi Burillo.

== Seeds ==
1. (Australia) Andrew Kratzmann / (Belgium) Libor Pimek (quarterfinals)
2. (Spain) Albert Portas / (Spain) Francisco Roig (semifinals)
3. (Spain) Alberto Berasategui / (Spain) Jordi Burillo (final)
4. (Italy) Andrea Gaudenzi / (Ecuador) Nicolás Lapentti (first round)

== Draw ==
=== Key ===
- Q = Qualifier
- WC = Wild card
- LL = Lucky loser
- Alt = Alternate
- SE = Special exempt
- PR = Protected ranking
- ITF = ITF entry
- JE = Junior exempt
- w/o = Walkover
- r = Retired
- d = Defaulted
- SR = Special ranking

=== Draw ===
First round
1	(Australia) A Kratzmann (Belgium) L Pimek	4	6	6
Q	(Spain) O Martinez (Spain) F Vicente	6	1	3
(Slovakia) D Hrbatý (Netherlands) S Noteboom	4	2
(Germany) B Karbacher (Sweden) T Nydahl	6	6
3	(Spain) A Berasategui (Spain) J Burillo	7	6
(Italy) F Maggi (Spain) S Navarro	6	2
WC	(Spain) R Fernández (Spain) D Sánchez	5	4
WC	(Spain) S Casal (Spain) E Sánchez	7	6
LL	(Spain) Diego Lozano (Spain) Fernando Sánchez	3	4
(Morocco) K Alami (Spain) J Alonso	6	6
(Spain) A Costa (Spain) C Costa	6	7
4	(Italy) A Gaudenzi (Ecuador) N Lapentti	4	5
(South Africa) C Haggard (Australia) J Holmes	5	4
(Sweden) N Holm (Sweden) L-A Wahlgren	7	6
WC	(Spain) S Gómez Barrio (Spain) JA Viloca-Puig	0	3
2	(Spain) A Portas (Spain) F Roig	6	6

Quarterfinals
1	(Australia) A Kratzmann (Belgium) L Pimek	6	3
(Germany) B Karbacher (Sweden) T Nydahl	7	6
3	(Spain) A Berasategui (Spain) J Burillo	6	6
WC	(Spain) S Casal (Spain) E Sánchez	3	3
(Morocco) K Alami (Spain) J Alonso	6	6	7
(Spain) A Costa (Spain) C Costa	2	7	6
(Sweden) N Holm (Sweden) L-A Wahlgren	6	4	2
2	(Spain) A Portas (Spain) F Roig	3	6	6

Semifinals
(Germany) B Karbacher (Sweden) T Nydahl	6	2
3	(Spain) A Berasategui (Spain) J Burillo	7	6
(Morocco) K Alami (Spain) J Alonso	4	7	6
2	(Spain) A Portas (Spain) F Roig	6	6	3

Final
3	(Spain) A Berasategui (Spain) J Burillo	6	3	0
(Morocco) K Alami (Spain) J Alonso	4	6	6
