= 1996 Marbella Open – Singles =

Singles
- 1996 Marbella Open

Final
- Champion: (Germany) Marc-Kevin Goellner
- Runner-up: (Spain) Àlex Corretja
- Score: 7–6^{(7–4)}, 7–6^{(7–2)}

Details
- Draw: 32
- Seeds: 8

Events
Singles	Doubles
← 1995 ·	Marbella Open	· 1997 →

Sjeng Schalken was the defending champion but did not compete that year.

Marc-Kevin Goellner won in the final 7–6^{(7–4)}, 7–6^{(7–2)} against Àlex Corretja.

== Seeds ==
A champion seed is indicated in bold text while text in italics indicates the round in which that seed was eliminated.

1. (Spain) Albert Costa (first round)
2. (Spain) Félix Mantilla (semifinals)
3. (Spain) Alberto Berasategui (second round)
4. (Spain) Àlex Corretja (final)
5. (Spain) Carlos Moyá (first round)
6. (Spain) Francisco Clavet (second round)
7. (Spain) Javier Sánchez (second round)
8. (Argentina) Hernán Gumy (first round)

== Draw ==
=== Key ===
- Q = Qualifier
- WC = Wild card
- LL = Lucky loser
- Alt = Alternate
- ITF = ITF entry
- PR = Protected ranking
- SR = Special ranking
- SE = Special exempt
- JE = Junior exempt
- JR = Junior Accelerator Programme entrant
- CO = College Accelerator Programme entrant
- NG = Next Gen Accelerator Program entrant
- w/o = Walkover
- r = Retired
- d = Defaulted

First round
1	(Spain) A Costa	4	5
(Germany) **B Karbacher**	**6**	**7**
(Argentina) G Pérez Roldán	2	1
WC	(Spain) **G Blanco**	**6**	**6**
SE	(Italy) M Martelli	3	1
(Spain) **C Costa**	**6**	**6**
LL	(Spain) **M A Gorriz**	**6**	**6**
8	(Argentina) H Gumy	3	2
4	(Spain) **À Corretja**	**6**	**7^{7}**
(Ecuador) N Lapentti	4	6^{2}
WC	(Spain) E Sánchez	3	2
SE	(Belgium) **J van Herck**	**6**	**6**
(Morocco) K Alami	2	6^{6}
Q	(Uruguay) **M Filippini**	**6**	**7^{8}**
Q	(Argentina) **F Squillari**	**6**	**6**
5	(Spain) C Moyá	4	4
6	(Spain) **F Clavet**	**6**	**7^{7}**
(Spain) J A Viloca	4	6^{2}
(Germany) **M-K Goellner**	**6**	**6**
(Spain) T Carbonell	3	2
Q	(Spain) **F Vicente**	**6**	**6**
(Spain) R Carretero	0	4
(Germany) C-U Steeb	4	4
3	(Spain) **A Berasategui**	**6**	**6**
7	(Spain) **J Sánchez**	2	**6**	**6**
(Austria) G Schaller	**6**	1	2
(Norway) **C Ruud**	**6**	**6**
WC	(Spain) E Benfele Álvarez	3	2
(Morocco) H Arazi	3	3
(Spain) **J Burillo**	**6**	**6**
Q	(Spain) A Portas	3	5
2	(Spain) **F Mantilla**	**6**	**7**

Second round
(Germany) **B Karbacher**	4	**7**	**6**
WC	(Spain) G Blanco	**6**	5	3
(Spain) C Costa	5	4
LL	(Spain) **M A Gorriz**	**7**	**6**
4	(Spain) **À Corretja**	**6**	**6**
SE	(Belgium) J van Herck	3	2
Q	(Uruguay) **M Filippini**	5	**6**	**7^{7}**
Q	(Argentina) F Squillari	**7**	3	6^{3}
6	(Spain) F Clavet	1	3
(Germany) **M-K Goellner**	**6**	**6**
Q	(Spain) **F Vicente**	6^{5}	**6**	**7**
3	(Spain) A Berasategui	**7^{7}**	2	5
7	(Spain) J Sánchez	4	1
(Norway) **C Ruud**	**6**	**6**
(Spain) J Burillo	5	3
2	(Spain) **F Mantilla**	**7**	**6**

Quarterfinals
(Germany) **B Karbacher**	**6**	2	**6**
LL	(Spain) M A Gorriz	3	**6**	4
4	(Spain) **À Corretja**	**7**	**6**
Q	(Uruguay) M Filippini	5	1
(Germany) **M-K Goellner**	**7**	**6**
Q	(Spain) F Vicente	5	1
(Norway) C Ruud	**6**	6^{2}	3
2	(Spain) **F Mantilla**	0	**7^{7}**	**6**

Semifinals
(Germany) B Karbacher	4	4
4	(Spain) **À Corretja**	**6**	**6**
(Germany) **M-K Goellner**	**7**	3	**6**
2	(Spain) F Mantilla	5	**6**	3

Final
4	(Spain) Àlex Corretja	6^{4}	6^{2}
(Germany) **M-K Goellner**	**7^{7}**	**7^{7}**
