= 1997 Marbella Open – Singles =

Singles
- 1997 Marbella Open

Final
- Champion: (Spain) Álbert Costa
- Runner-up: (Spain) Alberto Berasategui
- Score: 6–3, 6–2

Details
- Draw: 32
- Seeds: 8

Events
Singles	Doubles
← 1996 ·	Marbella Open	· 1998 →

== Seeds ==
A champion seed is indicated in bold text while text in italics indicates the round in which that seed was eliminated.

1. (Spain) **Álbert Costa (champion)**
2. (Spain) Alberto Berasategui (final)
3. (Spain) Albert Portas (second round)
4. (Slovakia) Dominik Hrbatý (semifinals)
5. (Morocco) Karim Alami (quarterfinals)
6. (Spain) Galo Blanco (semifinals)
7. (Spain) Julián Alonso (quarterfinals)
8. (France) Guillaume Raoux (second round)

== Draw ==
=== Key ===
- Q = Qualifier
- WC = Wild card
- LL = Lucky loser
- Alt = Alternate
- SE = Special exempt
- PR = Protected ranking
- ITF = ITF entry
- JE = Junior exempt
- w/o = Walkover
- r = Retired
- d = Defaulted
- SR = Special ranking

First round
1	(Spain) **Á Costa**	**6**	**6**
(Spain) F Vicente	1	2
(Spain) **J Burillo**	**6**	**6**
WC	(Spain) D Sánchez	4	4
(Italy) **A Gaudenzi**	**6**	**6**
Q	(Spain) S Navarro	0	2
WC	(Spain) E Sánchez	1	3
8	(France) **G Raoux**	**6**	**6**
3	(Spain) **A Portas**	3	**7**	**6**
(Spain) J A Viloca	**6**	5	2
(Spain) **F Roig**	**6**	**6**
Q	(Spain) R Carretero	1	0
(Spain) J A Marín	3	4
(Spain) **E Benfele Álvarez**	**6**	**6**
Q	(Spain) D Lozano	2	**6**	6^{2}
6	(Spain) **G Blanco**	**6**	4	**7^{7}**
5	(Morocco) **K Alami**	**6**	**6**
(Romania) I Moldovan	2	3
(Germany) **M Craca**	3	**6**	**6**
(Austria) G Schaller	**6**	2	1
(France) **A Clément**	**6**	**6**
Q	(Spain) S Gómez Barrio	4	2
(Ecuador) N Lapentti	3	2
4	(Slovakia) **D Hrbatý**	**6**	**6**
7	(Spain) **J Alonso**	**6**	**6**
(France) J Chauvin	3	0
(Germany) **B Karbacher**	3	**6**	**6**
WC	(Spain) R Fernández	**6**	0	3
(Romania) D Pescariu	3	4
(Sweden) **T Nydahl**	**6**	**6**
(Spain) C Costa	0	3
2	(Spain) **A Berasategui**	**6**	**6**

Second round
1	(Spain) **Á Costa**	**7^{7}**	**6**
(Spain) J Burillo	6^{4}	3
(Italy) **A Gaudenzi**	**6**	**6**
8	(France) G Raoux	4	2
3	(Spain) A Portas	4	3
(Spain) **F Roig**	**6**	**6**
(Spain) E Benfele Álvarez	4	4
6	(Spain) **G Blanco**	**6**	**6**
5	(Morocco) **K Alami**	4	**6**	**7**
(Germany) M Craca	**6**	3	5
(France) A Clément	4	4
4	(Slovakia) **D Hrbatý**	**6**	**6**
7	(Spain) **J Alonso**	**6**	**6**
(Germany) B Karbacher	4	1
(Sweden) T Nydahl	**6**	5	1
2	(Spain) **A Berasategui**	4	**7**	**6**

Quarterfinals
1	(Spain) **Á Costa**	**6**	**7^{7}**
(Italy) A Gaudenzi	3	6^{3}
(Spain) F Roig	6^{6}	3
6	(Spain) **G Blanco**	**7^{8}**	**6**
5	(Morocco) K Alami	3	5
4	(Slovakia) **D Hrbatý**	**6**	**7**
7	(Spain) J Alonso	1	4
2	(Spain) **A Berasategui**	**6**	**6**

Semifinals
1	(Spain) **Á Costa**	**7**	**6**
6	(Spain) G Blanco	5	2
4	(Slovakia) D Hrbatý	4	4
2	(Spain) **A Berasategui**	**6**	**6**

Final
1	(Spain) **Álbert Costa**	**6**	**6**
2	(Spain) Alberto Berasategui	3	2
