= 1995 Valencia Open – Singles =

Singles
- 1995 Valencia Open

Final
- Champion: (Netherlands) Sjeng Schalken
- Runner-up: (Austria) Gilbert Schaller
- Score: 6–4, 6–2

Details
- Draw: 32
- Seeds: 8

Events
| Singles | Doubles |
| Valencia Open | · 1996 → |

The 1995 Valencia Open – Singles was an event of the 1995 Valencia Open men's tennis tournament that was held in Valencia, Spain from 2 October until 9 October 1992. The draw comprised 32 players and eight were seeded. Unseeded Sjeng Schalken won the singles title, defeating second-seeded Gilbert Schaller, in the final in straight sets, 6–4, 6–2.

== Seeds ==
A champion seed is indicated in bold text while text in italics indicates the round in which that seed was eliminated.

1. (Spain) Alberto Berasategui (quarterfinals)
2. (Austria) Gilbert Schaller (final)
3. (Spain) Álbert Costa (second round)
4. (Spain) Àlex Corretja (second round, withdrew)
5. (Spain) Carlos Costa (first round)
6. (Spain) Francisco Clavet (first round)
7. (Czech Republic) Bohdan Ulihrach (second round)
8. (Spain) Jordi Arrese (first round)

== Draw ==
=== Key ===
- Q = Qualifier
- WC = Wild card
- LL = Lucky loser
- Alt = Alternate
- ITF = ITF entry
- PR = Protected ranking
- SR = Special ranking
- SE = Special exempt
- JE = Junior exempt
- JR = Junior Accelerator Programme entrant
- CO = College Accelerator Programme entrant
- NG = Next Gen Accelerator Program entrant
- w/o = Walkover
- r = Retired
- d = Defaulted

First round
1 | (Spain) **A Berasategui** | **6** | **6**
(Spain) A Portas | 3 | 3
(Spain) J Burillo | **6** | 3 | 2
(South Africa) **M Ondruska** | 3 | **6** | **6**
WC | (Spain) C Moyà | 2 | 2
(Netherlands) **S Schalken** | **6** | **6**
WC | (Spain) E Benfele Álvarez | 3 | 3
7 | (Czech Republic) **B Ulihrach** | **6** | **6**
3 | (Spain) **Á Costa** | **6** | **6**
Q | (Argentina) G Etlis | 3 | 3
(Sweden) **M Gustafsson** | **6** | **6**
(Germany) C-U Steeb | 2 | 0
Q | (Spain) **F Mantilla** | **6** | **6**
(Spain) O Martinez | 1 | 3
(Belgium) **K Goossens** | **7^{8}** | **6**
5 | (Spain) C Costa | 6^{6} | 0
6 | (Spain) **F Clavet** | **6** | **6**
Q | (Czech Republic) L Němeček | 1 | 1
(Argentina) **H Gumy** | **6** | **6**
Q | (Spain) Á Calatrava | 3 | 4
(Australia) **R Fromberg** | **6** | **6**
(Czech Republic) K Nováček | 4 | 4
WC | (Spain) J A Viloca | 6^{4} | 1
4 | (Spain) **À Corretja** | **7^{7}** | **6**
8 | (Spain) J Arrese | **6** | 3 | 3
(Spain) **T Carbonell** | 4 | **6** | **6**
(Spain) **Á López Morón** | 3
(Germany) C Arriens | 0^{r}
(Spain) **E Sánchez** | **6** | 6^{2} | **6**
(Spain) J Sánchez | 0 | **7^{7}** | 2
(Denmark) F Fetterlein | 4 | 1
2 | (Austria) **G Schaller** | **6** | **6**

Second round
1 | (Spain) **A Berasategui** | **6** | **7^{7}**
(South Africa) M Ondruska | 4 | 6^{3}
(Netherlands) **S Schalken** | 4 | **6** | **6**
7 | (Czech Republic) B Ulihrach | **6** | 4 | 2
3 | (Spain) Á Costa | 2 | 4
(Sweden) **M Gustafsson** | **6** | **6**
Q | (Spain) **F Mantilla** | **6** | **6**
(Belgium) K Goossens | 2 | 3
6 | (Spain) F Clavet | 4 | 2
(Argentina) **H Gumy** | **6** | **6**
(Australia) **R Fromberg** | w/o
4 | (Spain) À Corretja
(Spain) **T Carbonell** | 2 | **7^{7}** | **6**
(Spain) Á López Morón | **6** | 6^{2} | 4
(Spain) E Sánchez | 6^{2} | **7** | 6^{5}
2 | (Austria) **G Schaller** | **7^{7}** | 5 | **7^{7}**

Quarterfinals
1 | (Spain) A Berasategui | **6** | 4 | 6^{3}
(Netherlands) **S Schalken** | 3 | **6** | **7^{7}**
(Sweden) M Gustafsson | **6** | 6^{6} | 1
Q | (Spain) **F Mantilla** | 4 | **7^{8}** | **6**
(Argentina) **H Gumy** | **6** | **6**
(Australia) R Fromberg | 1 | 3
(Spain) T Carbonell | 5 | 2
2 | (Austria) **G Schaller** | **7** | **6**

Semifinals
(Netherlands) **S Schalken** | **6** | 4 | **6**
Q | (Spain) F Mantilla | 4 | **6** | 2
(Argentina) H Gumy | **7** | 0 | 4
2 | (Austria) **G Schaller** | 5 | **6** | **6**

Final
(Netherlands) **Sjeng Schalken** | **6** | **6**
2 | (Austria) Gilbert Schaller | 4 | 2
