= 1997 Torneo Godó =

- Date: 14–21 April
- Edition: 45th
- Category: Championship Series
- Draw: 56S / 28D
- Prize money: $825,000
- Surface: Clay / outdoor
- Location: Barcelona, Catalonia, Spain

Champions

Singles
- (Spain) Albert Costa

Doubles
- (Spain) Alberto Berasategui / (Spain) Jordi Burillo
- Torneo Godó

The 1997 Torneo Godó was a men's tennis tournament played on Clay in Barcelona, Catalonia, Spain that was part of the ATP Championship Series of the 1997 ATP Tour. It was the 45th edition of the tournament and was held from 14 to 21 April 1997. Seventh-seeded Albert Costa won the singles title.

This event also carried the joint denominations of the Campeonatos Internacionales de España or Spanish International Championships that was hosted at this venue and location, and was 30th edition to be held in Barcelona, and the Open Seat Godó' and is the 2nd edition branded under that name.

== Finals ==
=== Singles ===
(Spain) Albert Costa defeated (Spain) Albert Portas, 7–5, 6–4, 6–4

- It was Costa's 1st singles title of the year and the 5th of his career.

=== Doubles ===
(Spain) Alberto Berasategui / (Spain) Jordi Burillo defeated (Argentina) Pablo Albano / (Spain) Àlex Corretja, 6–3, 7–5
