= 1997 Torneo Godó – Singles =

Singles
- 1997 Torneo Godó

Final
- Champion: (Spain) Albert Costa
- Runner-up: (Spain) Albert Portas
- Score: 7–5, 6–4, 6–4

Details
- Draw: 56
- Seeds: 16

Events
Singles	Doubles
- Torneo Godó

The 1997 Torneo Godó was a men's tennis tournament played on Clay in Barcelona, Spain that was part of the International Series Gold of the 1997 ATP Tour. It was the 45th edition of the tournament and was held from 14–21 April.

== Seeds ==
Champion seeds are indicated in bold text while text in italics indicates the round in which those seeds were eliminated.

1. (Austria) Thomas Muster (third round)
2. (Russia) Kafelnikov (second round)
3. (Croatia) Goran Ivanišević (second round)
4. (Spain) Carlos Moyá (semifinals)
5. (Chile) Marcelo Ríos (second round)
6. (South Africa) Wayne Ferreira (second round)
7. (Spain) **Albert Costa (champion)**
8. (Spain) Félix Mantilla (third round)
9. (Spain) Albert Portas (semifinals)
10. (Spain) Sergi Bruguera (first round)
11. (Spain) Àlex Corretja (first round)
12. (Netherlands) Jan Siemerink (first round)
13. (Czech Republic) Bohdan Ulihrach (first round)
14. (Sweden) Magnus Gustafsson (first round)
15. (Germany) Michael Stich (first round)
16. (France) Cédric Pioline (quarterfinals)

== Draw ==
Key

- Q = Qualifier
- WC = Wild card
- LL = Lucky loser
- Alt = Alternate
- ITF = ITF entry
- PR = Protected ranking
- SR = Special ranking
- SE = Special exempt
- JE = Junior exempt
- JR = Junior Accelerator Programme entrant
- CO = College Accelerator Programme entrant
- NG = Next Gen Accelerator Program entrant
- w/o = Walkover
- r = Retired
- d = Defaulted

=== Finals ===
Semifinals
7	**(Spain) Albert Costa**	**7**	**7**
4	(Spain) Carlos Moyá	6	5
**(Spain) Albert Portas**	**6**	**7**
9	(Spain) Alberto Berasategui	3	5

Final
7	**(Spain) Albert Costa**	**7**	**6**	**6**
(Spain) Albert Portas	5	4	4

=== Top half ===
==== Section 1 ====
First round
**(Italy) R Furlan**	6	**6**	**7**
(Spain) J Díaz	**7**	3	5
**(Uruguay) M Filippini**	4	**6**	**6**
(Italy) A Gaudenzi	**6**	4	3
16	**(France) C Pioline**	**7**	**6**
(Argentina) H Gumy	6	3
**(Germany) M-K Goellner**	**6**	2	**6**
10	(Spain) S Bruguera	4	**6**	2
**(Spain) G López**	**6**	**6**
(Spain) D Salvador-Estepa	4	1
**(Spain) JA Viloca**	**6**	**6**
(Denmark) K Carlsen	3	0

Second round
1	**(Austria) T Muster**	5	**6**	**6**
(Italy) R Furlan	**7**	4	4
(Uruguay) M Filippini	2	4
16	**(France) C Pioline**	**6**	**6**
**(Germany) M-K Goellner**	6	**6**	**7**
(Spain) G López	**7**	4	6
(Spain) JA Viloca	4	3
7	**(Spain) A Costa**	**6**	**6**

Third round
1	(Austria) T Muster	6	4
16	**(France) C Pioline**	**7**	**6**
(Germany) M-K Goellner
7	**(Spain) A Costa**	w/o

Quarterfinals
16	(France) C Pioline	4	2
7	**(Spain) A Costa**	**6**	**6**

==== Section 2 ====
First round
**(Spain) F Clavet**	**6**	1	**6**
(Spain) T Carbonell	3	**6**	4
**(Morocco) H Arazi**	**6**	**6**
(Spain) M Górriz	3	4
**(Spain) J Alonso**	**7**	3	**6**
14	(Sweden) M Gustafsson	6	**6**	3
**(Ukraine) A Medvedev**	**7**	2	**6**
11	(Spain) À Corretja	5	**6**	4
**(Spain) C Costa**	**6**	**6**
(Netherlands) A Schalken	2	1
**(Spain) A Martín**	**6**	**6**
(Romania) A Voinea	1	1

Second round
4	**(Spain) C Moyá**	**6**	**6**
(Spain) F Clavet	4	4
**(Morocco) H Arazi**	**6**	4	**6**
(Spain) J Alonso	3	**6**	3
**(Ukraine) A Medvedev**	**6**	**6**
(Spain) C Costa	2	;0
**(Spain) A Martín**	4	**6**	**7**
6	(South Africa) W Ferreira	**6**	2	5

Third round
4	**(Spain) C Moyá**	**7**	4	**6**
(Morocco) H Arazi	5	**6**	1
**(Ukraine) A Medvedev**	**6**	**6**
(Spain) A Martín	4	2

Quarterfinals
4	**(Spain) C Moyá**	**6**	**6**
(Ukraine) A Medvedev	4	2

=== Bottom half ===
==== Section 3 ====
First round
**(Spain) A Portas**	**6**	**6**
(Brazil) G Kuerten	2	1
**(Spain) J Burillo**	**6**	**6**
(Spain) E Sánchez	3	0
**(Spain) F Vicente**	**6**	**6**
12	(Netherlands) J Siemerink	4	3
**(Norway) C Ruud**	**6**	**6**
13	(Czech Republic) B Ulihrach	3	4
**(United States) D Johnson**	**7**	3	**6**
(Spain) R Carretero-Diaz	6	**6**	3
**(Morocco) K Alami**	**6**	**6**
(Spain) G Blanco	4	4

Second round
5	(Chile) M Ríos	5	6
**(Spain) A Portas**	**7**	**7**
(Spain) J Burillo	4	2
**(Spain) F Vicente**	**6**	**6**
**(Norway) C Ruud**	**6**	**7**
(United States) D Johnson	4	6
**(Morocco) K Alami**	**6**	**6**
3	(Croatia) G Ivanišević	2	3

Third round
**(Spain) A Portas**	**7**	3	**6**
(Spain) F Vicente	5	**6**	1
(Norway) C Ruud	3	2
**(Morocco) K Alami**	**6**	**6**

Quarterfinals
**(Spain) A Portas**	**6**	**7**
(Morocco) K Alami	2	5

==== Section 4 ====
First round
**(Spain) F Roig**	**7**	**6**
(Spain) A López Morón	6	4
**(Australia) R Fromberg**	**7**	**6**
(Australia) S Draper	6	3
9	**(Spain) A Berasategui**	**6**	**6**
(Spain) J Sánchez	1	2
**(Austria) G Schaller**	**6**	**6**
15	(Germany) M Stich	2	2
**(Brazil) F Meligeni**	**7**	**6**
(Slovakia) K Kučera	5	0
**(Sweden) M Larsson**	**7**	**6**
(Slovakia) D Hrbatý	5	4

Second round
8	**(Spain) F Mantilla**	**6**	**6**
(Spain) F Roig	4	0
(Australia) R Fromberg	4	3
9	**(Spain) A Berasategui**	**6**	**6**
(Austria) G Schaller	5	2
**(Brazil) F Meligeni**	**7**	**6**
**(Sweden) M Larsson**	3	**6**	**6**
2	(Russia) Y Kafelnikov	**6**	2	3

Third round
8	(Spain) F Mantilla	6	1
9	**(Spain) A Berasategui**	**7**	**6**
**(Brazil) F Meligeni**	**6**	**7**
(Sweden) M Larsson	3	5

Quarterfinals
9	**(Spain) A Berasategui**	**6**	**7**
(Brazil) F Meligeni	2	5
