= Gustavo Kuerten career statistics =

Career finals
Discipline	Type	Won	Lost	Total	WR
Singles	Grand Slam tournaments	3	–	3	1.00
Singles	Year-end championships	1	–	1	1.00
Singles	ATP Masters 1000*	5	5	10	0.50
Singles	Olympic Games	–	–	–	–
Singles	ATP Tour 500	4	1	5	0.80
Singles	ATP Tour 250	7	3	10	0.70
Singles	Total	20	9	29	0.69
Doubles	Grand Slam tournaments	–	–	–	–
Doubles	Year-end championships	–	–	–	–
Doubles	ATP Masters 1000*	–	1	1	0.00
Doubles	Olympic Games	–	–	–	–
Doubles	ATP Tour 500	2	–	2	1.00
Doubles	ATP Tour 250	6	1	7	0.86
Doubles	Total	8	2	10	0.80
Total		28	11	39	0.72
1) WR = Winning Rate; 2) * formerly known as "Super 9" (1996–1999), "Tennis Masters Series" (2000–2003) or "ATP Masters Series" (2004–2008).

This is a list of the main career statistics of former Brazilian professional tennis player, Gustavo Kuerten. All statistics are according to the ATP World Tour and ITF website. Throughout his career, Kuerten won a total of 28 ATP titles — 20 in singles, including 3 Grand Slam titles, 5 ATP Masters Series tournaments and a Tennis Masters Cup, as well as 8 in doubles.

== Significant finals ==
=== Grand Slam tournaments ===
==== Singles: 3 (3 titles) ====
Result	Year	Championship	Surface	Opponent	Score
Win	1997	French Open	Clay	(Spain) Sergi Bruguera	6–3, 6–4, 6–2
Win	2000	French Open (2)	Clay	(Sweden) Magnus Norman	6–2, 6–3, 2–6, 7–6^{(8–6)}
Win	2001	French Open (3)	Clay	(Spain) Àlex Corretja	6–7^{(3–7)}, 7–5, 6–2, 6–0

=== Year-end championships ===
==== Singles: 1 (1 title) ====
Result	Year	Championship	Surface	Opponent	Score
Win	2000	Tennis Masters Cup, Lisbon	Hard (i)	(United States) Andre Agassi	6–4, 6–4, 6–4

=== Masters Series tournaments ===
==== Singles: 10 (5 titles, 5 runners-up) ====
Result	Year	Tournament	Surface	Opponent	Score
Loss	1997	Canada Masters	Hard	(United States) Chris Woodruff	5–7, 6–4, 3–6
Win	1999	Monte-Carlo Masters	Clay	(Chile) Marcelo Ríos	6–4, 2–1, retired
Win	1999	Rome Masters	Clay	(Australia) Patrick Rafter	6–4, 7–5, 7–6^{(8–6)}
Loss	2000	Miami Masters	Hard	(United States) Pete Sampras	1–6, 7–6^{(7–2)}, 6–7^{(5–7)}, 6–7^{(8–10)}
Loss	2000	Rome Masters	Clay	(Sweden) Magnus Norman	3–6, 6–4, 4–6, 4–6
Win	2000	Hamburg Masters	Clay	(Russia) Marat Safin	6–4, 5–7, 6–4, 5–7, 7–6^{(7–3)}
Win	2001	Monte-Carlo Masters (2)	Clay	(Morocco) Hicham Arazi	6–3, 6–2, 6–4
Loss	2001	Rome Masters	Clay	(Spain) Juan Carlos Ferrero	6–3, 1–6, 6–2, 4–6, 2–6
Win	2001	Cincinnati Masters	Hard	(Australia) Patrick Rafter	6–1, 6–3
Loss	2003	Indian Wells Masters	Hard	(Australia) Lleyton Hewitt	1–6, 1–6

==== Doubles: 1 (1 runner-up) ====
Result	Year	Tournament	|Surface	Partner	Opponent	Score
Loss	2002	Paris Masters	Carpet (i)	(France) Cédric Pioline	(France) Nicolas Escudé (France) Fabrice Santoro	3–6, 6–7^{(6–8)}

== Career finals ==
=== ATP career finals ===
==== Singles: 29 (20 titles, 9 runners-up) ====
Legend Grand Slam (3–0) Year-end championships (1–0) ATP Masters Series (5–5) ATP International Series Gold (4–1) ATP International Series (7–3)	Finals by surface Hard (6–4) Clay (14–4) Grass (0–0) Carpet (0–1)	Finals by setting Outdoor (18–8) Indoor (2–1)

Result	W–L	Date	Tournament	Surface	Opponent	Score
Win	1–0	Jun 1997	French Open, Paris, France	Clay	(Spain) Sergi Bruguera	6–3, 6–4, 6–2
Loss	1–1	Jun 1997	Bologna, Italy	Clay	(Spain) Félix Mantilla	6–4, 2–6, 1–6
Loss	1–2	Aug 1997	Montréal, Canada	Hard	(United States) Chris Woodruff	5–7, 6–4, 3–6
Win	2–2	Jul 1998	Stuttgart, Germany	Clay	(Slovakia) Karol Kučera	4–6, 6–2, 6–4
Win	3–2	Oct 1998	Majorca, Spain	Clay	(Spain) Carlos Moyá	6–7^{(5–7)}, 6–2, 6–3
Win	4–2	Apr 1999	Monte Carlo, Monaco	Clay	(Chile) Marcelo Ríos	6–4, 2–1, retired
Win	5–2	May 1999	Rome, Italy	Clay	(Australia) Patrick Rafter	6–4, 7–5, 7–6^{(8–6)}
Win	6–2	Mar 2000	Santiago, Chile	Clay	(Argentina) Mariano Puerta	7–6^{(7–3)}, 6–3
Loss	6–3	Apr 2000	Miami, USA	Hard	(United States) Pete Sampras	1–6, 7–6^{(7–2)}, 6–7^{(5–7)}, 6–7^{(8–10)}
Loss	6–4	May 2000	Rome, Italy	Clay	(Sweden) Magnus Norman	3–6, 6–4, 4–6, 4–6
Win	7–4	May 2000	Hamburg, Germany	Clay	(Russia) Marat Safin	6–4, 5–7, 6–4, 5–7, 7–6^{(7–3)}
Win	8–4	Jun 2000	French Open, Paris, France (2)	Clay	(Sweden) Magnus Norman	6–2, 6–3, 2–6, 7–6^{(8–6)}
Win	9–4	Aug 2000	Indianapolis, USA	Hard	(Russia) Marat Safin	3–6, 7–6^{(7–2)}, 7–6^{(7–2)}
Win	10–4	Dec 2000	Tennis Masters Cup, Lisbon, Portugal	Hard (i)	(United States) Andre Agassi	6–4, 6–4, 6–4
Win	11–4	Feb 2001	Buenos Aires, Argentina	Clay	(Argentina) José Acasuso	6–1, 6–3
Win	12–4	Mar 2001	Acapulco, Mexico	Clay	(Spain) Galo Blanco	6–4, 6–2
Win	13–4	Apr 2001	Monte Carlo, Monaco (2)	Clay	(Morocco) Hicham Arazi	6–3, 6–2, 6–4
Loss	13–5	May 2001	Rome, Italy	Clay	(Spain) Juan Carlos Ferrero	6–3, 1–6, 6–2, 4–6, 2–6
Win	14–5	Jun 2001	French Open, Paris, France (3)	Clay	(Spain) Àlex Corretja	6–7^{(3–7)}, 7–5, 6–2, 6–0
Win	15–5	Jul 2001	Stuttgart, Germany (2)	Clay	(Argentina) Guillermo Cañas	6–3, 6–2, 6–4
Win	16–5	Aug 2001	Cincinnati, USA	Hard	(Australia) Patrick Rafter	6–1, 6–3
Loss	16–6	Aug 2001	Indianapolis, USA	Hard	(Australia) Patrick Rafter	2–4, retired
Win	17–6	Sep 2002	Costa do Sauípe, Brazil	Hard	(Argentina) Guillermo Coria	6–7^{(4–7)}, 7–5, 7–6^{(7–2)}
Loss	17–7	Oct 2002	Lyon, France	Carpet (i)	(France) Paul-Henri Mathieu	6–4, 3–6, 1–6
Win	18–7	Jan 2003	Auckland, New Zealand	Hard	(Slovakia) Dominik Hrbatý	6–3, 7–5
Loss	18–8	Mar 2003	Indian Wells, USA	Hard	(Australia) Lleyton Hewitt	1–6, 1–6
Win	19–8	Oct 2003	St. Petersburg, Russia	Hard (i)	(Armenia) Sargis Sargsian	6–4, 6–3
Loss	19–9	Feb 2004	Viña del Mar, Chile	Clay	(Chile) Fernando González	5–7, 4–6
Win	20–9	Feb 2004	Costa do Sauípe, Brazil (2)	Clay	(Argentina) Agustín Calleri	3–6, 6–2, 6–3

==== Doubles: 10 (8 titles, 2 runners-up) ====
Legend Grand Slam (0–0) Year-end championships (0–0) ATP Masters Series (0–1) ATP International Series Gold (2–0) ATP International Series (6–1)	Finals by Surface Hard (1–1) Clay (7–0) Grass (0–0) Carpet (0–1)	Finals by setting Outdoor (8–1) Indoor (0–1)

Result	W–L	Date	Tournament	Surface	Partner	Opponents	Score
Win	1–0	Nov 1996	Santiago, Chile	Clay	(Brazil) Fernando Meligeni	(Romania) Dinu Pescariu (Spain) Albert Portas	6–4, 6–2
Win	2–0	Apr 1997	Estoril, Portugal	Clay	(Brazil) Fernando Meligeni	(Italy) Andrea Gaudenzi (Italy) Filippo Messori	6–2, 6–2
Win	3–0	Jun 1997	Bologna, Italy	Clay	(Brazil) Fernando Meligeni	(United States) Dave Randall (United States) Jack Waite	6–2, 7–5
Win	4–0	Jul 1997	Stuttgart, Germany	Clay	(Brazil) Fernando Meligeni	(United States) Donald Johnson (United States) Francisco Montana	6–4, 6–4
Win	5–0	Jul 1998	Gstaad, Switzerland	Clay	(Brazil) Fernando Meligeni	(Argentina) Daniel Orsanic (Czech Republic) Cyril Suk	6–4, 7–5
Win	6–0	Jan 1999	Adelaide, Australia	Hard	(Ecuador) Nicolás Lapentti	(United States) Jim Courier (United States) Patrick Galbraith	6–4, 6–4
Win	7–0	Mar 2000	Santiago, Chile (2)	Clay	(Brazil) Antonio Prieto	(South Africa) Lan Bale (South Africa) Piet Norval	6–2, 6–4
Win	8–0	Mar 2001	Acapulco, Mexico	Clay	(United States) Donald Johnson	(South Africa) David Adams (Argentina) Martín García	6–3, 7–6^{(7–5)}
Loss	8–1	Sep 2002	Costa do Sauípe, Brazil	Hard	(Brazil) André Sá	(United States) Scott Humphries (The Bahamas) Mark Merklein	3–6, 6–7^{(1–7)}
Loss	8–2	Nov 2002	Paris, France	Carpet (i)	(France) Cédric Pioline	(France) Nicolas Escudé (France) Fabrice Santoro	3–6, 6–7^{(6–8)}

== Performance timelines ==
Key
W	F	SF	QF	#R	RR	Q#	P#	DNQ	A	Z#	PO	G	S	B	NMS	NTI	P	NH

(W) winner; (F) finalist; (SF) semifinalist; (QF) quarterfinalist; (#R) rounds 4, 3, 2, 1; (RR) round-robin stage; (Q#) qualification round; (DNQ) did not qualify; (A) absent; (NH) not held; (SR) strike rate (events won / competed); (W–L) win–loss record.

Davis Cup matches are included in the statistics. Walkovers or qualifying matches are neither official wins nor losses.

Current as far as 2008 French Open.

=== Singles ===
Tournament	1995	1996	1997	1998	1999	2000	2001	2002	2003	2004	2005	2006	2007	2008	SR	W–L	Win %
Grand Slam Tournaments
Australian Open	A	A	2R	2R	2R	1R	2R	1R	2R	3R	A	A	A	A	0 / 8	7–8	46.67%
French Open	A	1R	W	2R	QF	W	W	4R	4R	QF	1R	A	A	1R	3 / 11	36–8	81.82%
Wimbledon	A	A	1R	1R	QF	3R	A	A	2R	A	A	A	A	A	0 / 5	7–5	58.33%
US Open	A	A	3R	2R	QF	1R	QF	4R	1R	1R	2R	A	A	A	0 / 9	15–9	62.50%
Win–loss	0–0	0–1	10–3	3–4	13–4	9–3	12–2	6–3	5–4	6–3	1–2	0–0	0–0	0–1	3 / 33	65–30	68.42%
Year-end championship
Tennis Masters Cup	did not qualify				RR	W	RR	did not qualify							1 / 3	5–6	45.45%
Grand Slam Cup	DNQ		1R	DNQ	1R	not held									0 / 2	0–2	0.00%
National representation
Summer Olympics	NH	A	not held			QF	not held			1R	not held			A	0 / 2	3–2	60.00%
ATP Masters Series
Indian Wells Masters	A	Q2	3R	1R	SF	2R	3R	A	F	2R	A	A	1R	A	0 / 8	14–8	63.64%
Miami Masters	A	Q2	3R	QF	2R	F	3R	A	2R	2R	A	A	1R	1R	0 / 9	11–9	55.00%
Monte-Carlo Masters	A	A	1R	3R	W	1R	W	A	2R	1R	1R	A	A	1R	2 / 9	14–7	66.67%
Rome Masters	A	A	A	SF	W	F	F	2R	1R	A	1R	A	A	A	1 / 7	20–6	76.92%
Hamburg Masters	Q3	A	1R	QF	QF	W	1R	QF	3R	A	2R	A	A	A	1 / 8	16–7	69.57%
Canada Masters	A	A	F	1R	A	2R	3R	1R	1R	3R	A	A	A	A	0 / 7	9–7	56.25%
Cincinnati Masters	A	A	QF	A	QF	SF	W	1R	1R	2R	A	A	A	A	1 / 7	16–6	72.73%
Stuttgart Masters^{1}	A	A	3R	A	3R	3R	2R	1R	2R	A	A	A	A	A	0 / 6	3–6	33.33%
Paris Masters	A	A	2R	A	2R	SF	3R	1R	3R	A	A	A	A	A	0 / 6	6–6	50.00%
Win–loss	0–0	0–0	12–8	10–6	21–6	25–8	23–7	4–6	10–9	3–5	1–3	0–0	0–2	0–2	5 / 67	109–62	63.74%
Career statistics
Finals	0	0	3	2	2	7	8	2	3	2	0	0	0	0	29		
Titles	0	0	1	2	2	5	6	1	2	1	0	0	0	0	20		
Hard win–loss	0–0	1–1	17–8	15–11	19–11	28–12	23–11	5–6	15–9	8–8	1–1	0–0	1–4	0–1	133–83		61.57%
Clay win–loss	0–0	7–7	16–10	26–12	23–6	28–6	36–4	16–6	16–8	15–5	5–9	0–1	1–3	0–3	189–80		70.26%
Grass win–loss	0–0	0–0	0–2	0–2	4–1	2–2	0–0	0–0	1–1	0–0	0–0	0–0	0–0	0–0	7–8		46.67%
Carpet win–loss	0–0	3–2	3–5	0–0	4–7	5–2	1–3	4–2	9–3	0–0	0–0	0–0	0–0	0–0	29–24		54.72%
Overall win–loss	0–0	11–10	36–25	41–25	50–25	63–22	60–18	25–14	41–21	23–13	6–10	0–1	2–7	0–4	358–195		
Win %	–	52%	59%	62%	67%	74%	77%	64%	66%	64%	38%	0%	22%	0%	64.74%		
Year-end ranking	188	88	14	23	5	1	2	37	16	40	291	1078	680	1150			

Notes: Kuerten received a walkover in the third round at the 2000 Rome Masters.

^{1}Held as Stuttgart Masters until 2001, Madrid Masters from 2002 to 2008.

=== Doubles ===
Tournament	1995	1996	1997	1998	1999	2000	2001	2002	2003	2004	2005	2006	2007	2008	SR	W–L	Win %
Grand Slam Tournaments
Australian Open	A	A	1R	2R	QF^{1}	A	1R	A	A	A	A	A	A	A	0 / 4	4–3	57.14%
French Open	A	A	2R	QF	2R	A	A	A	A	A	A	A	A	1R	0 / 4	5–4	55.56%
Wimbledon	A	A	A	A	1R	1R	A	A	A	A	A	A	A	A	0 / 2	0–2	0.00%
US Open	A	A	1R	A	A	A	A	A	1R	1R	A	A	1R	A	0 / 4	0–4	0.00%
Win–loss	0–0	0–0	1–3	4–2	4–2	0–1	0–1	0–0	0–1	0–1	0–0	0–0	0–1	0–1	0 / 14	9–13	40.91%

Notes:

^{1}Kuerten and Nicolás Lapentti withdrew before the quarterfinals of the 1999 Australian Open.

== Record against top 10 players ==
Kuerten's record against players who held a top 10 ranking, with those who reached No. 1 in bold.

=== Singles ===
- (Argentina) Guillermo Cañas 7–0
- (Spain) Àlex Corretja 7–2
- (Sweden) Magnus Norman 7–3
- (Russia) **Yevgeny Kafelnikov** 7–5
- (Spain) Albert Costa 6–2
- (Croatia) Goran Ivanišević 6–2
- (Germany) Tommy Haas 5–1
- (South Africa) Wayne Ferreira 5–2
- (Croatia) Ivan Ljubičić 5–2
- (Argentina) Guillermo Coria 4–1
- (Ecuador) Nicolás Lapentti 4–2
- (Spain) Félix Mantilla 4–3
- (Spain) **Carlos Moyá** 4–3
- (Russia) **Marat Safin** 4–3
- (Australia) **Patrick Rafter** 4–4
- (United States) **Andre Agassi** 4–7
- (Spain) Sergi Bruguera 3–0
- (Austria) **Thomas Muster** 3–0
- (Czech Republic) Jiří Novák 3–0
- (United States) Michael Chang 3–2
- (Slovakia) Karol Kučera 3–2
- (Argentina) Mariano Puerta 3–2
- (Germany) Rainer Schüttler 3–2
- (Argentina) Gastón Gaudio 3–3
- (United Kingdom) Tim Henman 3–5
- (France) Arnaud Clément 2–0
- (Russia) Nikolay Davydenko 2–0
- (United States) Mardy Fish 2–0
- (Switzerland) Marc Rosset 2–0
- (Spain) Alberto Berasategui 2–1
- (Switzerland) **Roger Federer** 2–1
- (Chile) Fernando González 2–1
- (Germany) Nicolas Kiefer 2–1
- (Ukraine) Andriy Medvedev 2–1
- (Chile) Nicolás Massú 2–2
- (Australia) Mark Philippoussis 2–2
- (Chile) **Marcelo Ríos** 2–2
- (Spain) **Juan Carlos Ferrero** 2–3
- (Slovakia) Dominik Hrbatý 2–3
- (France) Sébastien Grosjean 2–4
- (Spain) Nicolás Almagro 1–0
- (United States) James Blake 1–0
- (Russia) Andrei Chesnokov 1–0
- (France) Richard Gasquet 1–0
- (Netherlands) Richard Krajicek 1–0
- (Spain) David Ferrer 1–1
- (Sweden) Thomas Johansson 1–1
- (United States) **Andy Roddick** 1–1
- (Sweden) Jonas Björkman 1–2
- (United States) Todd Martin 1–2
- (United States) **Pete Sampras** 1–2
- (Australia) **Lleyton Hewitt** 1–3
- (Spain) Tommy Robredo 1–4
- (United Kingdom) Greg Rusedski 1–4
- (Croatia) Mario Ančić 0–1
- (United States) **Jim Courier** 0–1
- (Sweden) Magnus Gustafsson 0–1
- (Czech Republic) Petr Korda 0–1
- (Argentina) Juan Mónaco 0–1
- (Argentina) David Nalbandian 0–1
- (Argentina) Juan Martín del Potro 0–1
- (Sweden) Thomas Enqvist 0–2
- (Thailand) Paradorn Srichaphan 0–2
- (Czech Republic) Radek Štěpánek 0–2
- (France) Cédric Pioline 0–3

*As of June 9, 2008.

==== Wins per season ====
In singles, Kuerten has a 38–36 record against players who were, at the time the match was played, ranked in the top 10.

Season	1995	1996	1997	1998	1999	2000	2001	2002	2003	2004	2005	2006	2007	2008	**Total**
Wins	0	0	4	3	9	10	7	2	1	2	0	0	0	0	**38**

#	Player	Rank	Event	Surface	Rd	Score	GK rank
1997
1.	(South Africa) Wayne Ferreira	10	Indian Wells, United States	Hard	2R	7–6^{(7–5)}, 1–6, 6–3	76
2.	(Austria) Thomas Muster	5	French Open, Paris, France	Clay	3R	6–7^{(3–7)}, 6–1, 6–3, 3–6, 6–4	66
3.	(Russia) Yevgeny Kafelnikov	3	French Open, Paris, France	Clay	QF	6–2, 5–7, 2–6, 6–0, 6–4	66
4.	(United States) Michael Chang	2	Montréal, Canada	Hard	SF	6–3, 6–1	13
1998
5.	(Spain) Carlos Moyá	4	Stuttgart, Germany	Clay	SF	7–6^{(8–6)}, 6–4	26
6.	(Chile) Marcelo Ríos	2	Long Island, United States	Hard	3R	6–3, 7–6^{(7–4)}	27
7.	(Spain) Carlos Moyá	5	Majorca, Spain	Clay	F	6–7^{(5–7)}, 6–2, 6–3	25
1999
8.	(United Kingdom) Greg Rusedski	9	Sydney, Australia	Hard	1R	1–6, 6–3, 6–4	23
9.	(Russia) Yevgeny Kafelnikov	2	Indian Wells, United States	Hard	2R	0–6, 7–6^{(7–4)}, 6–3	22
10.	(Netherlands) Richard Krajicek	8	Indian Wells, United States	Hard	QF	6–4, 6–4	22
11.	(Spain) Àlex Corretja	6	Davis Cup, Lérida, Spain	Clay	RR	6–3, 6–4, 7–5	18
12.	(Spain) Carlos Moyá	2	Davis Cup, Lérida, Spain	Clay	RR	6–2, 6–4, 6–1	18
13.	(Russia) Yevgeny Kafelnikov	**1**	Rome, Italy	Clay	3R	7–5, 6–1	14
14.	(Spain) Àlex Corretja	7	Rome, Italy	Clay	SF	6–4, 6–2	14
15.	(Australia) Patrick Rafter	4	Rome, Italy	Clay	F	6–4, 7–5, 7–6^{(8–6)}	14
16.	(Ecuador) Nicolás Lapentti	8	Tennis Masters Cup, Hanover, Germany	Carpet (i)	RR	6–1, 6–2	3
2000
17.	(United States) Andre Agassi	**1**	Miami, United States	Hard	SF	6–1, 6–4	6
18.	(Sweden) Magnus Norman	4	Hamburg, Germany	Clay	QF	6–4, 6–2	7
19.	(Russia) Yevgeny Kafelnikov	4	French Open, Paris, France	Clay	QF	6–3, 3–6, 4–6, 6–4, 6–2	5
20.	(Sweden) Magnus Norman	3	French Open, Paris, France	Clay	F	6–2, 6–3, 2–6, 7–6^{(8–6)}	5
21.	(Australia) Lleyton Hewitt	7	Indianapolis, United States	Hard	SF	7–5, 6–2	2
22.	(Russia) Marat Safin	9	Indianapolis, United States	Hard	F	3–6, 7–6^{(7–2)}, 7–6^{(7–2)}	2
23.	(Sweden) Magnus Norman	4	Tennis Masters Cup, Lisbon, Portugal	Hard (i)	RR	7–5, 6–3	2
24.	(Russia) Yevgeny Kafelnikov	5	Tennis Masters Cup, Lisbon, Portugal	Hard (i)	RR	6–3, 6–4	2
25.	(United States) Pete Sampras	3	Tennis Masters Cup, Lisbon, Portugal	Hard (i)	SF	6–7^{(5–7)}, 6–3, 6–4	2
26.	(United States) Andre Agassi	8	Tennis Masters Cup, Lisbon, Portugal	Hard (i)	F	6–4, 6–4, 6–4	2
2001
27.	(Australia) Patrick Rafter	8	Davis Cup, Florianópolis, Brazil	Clay	RR	4–6, 6–4, 7–6^{(7–1)}, 2–1 ret.	2
28.	(Russia) Yevgeny Kafelnikov	7	French Open, Paris, France	Clay	QF	6–1, 3–6, 7–6^{(7–5)}, 6–4	**1**
29.	(Spain) Juan Carlos Ferrero	4	French Open, Paris, France	Clay	SF	6–4, 6–4, 6–3	**1**
30.	(Russia) Yevgeny Kafelnikov	6	Cincinnati, United States	Hard	QF	6–4, 3–6, 6–4	**1**
31.	(United Kingdom) Tim Henman	8	Cincinnati, United States	Hard	SF	6–2, 1–6, 7–6^{(7–4)}	**1**
32.	(Australia) Patrick Rafter	7	Cincinnati, United States	Hard	F	6–1, 6–3	**1**
33.	(United Kingdom) Tim Henman	9	Indianapolis, United States	Hard	QF	3–6, 6–1, 7–5	**1**
2002
34.	(Russia) Marat Safin	2	US Open, New York, United States	Hard	2R	6–4, 6–4, 7–5	46
35.	(Russia) Marat Safin	4	Lyon, France	Carpet (i)	QF	7–5, 4–6, 7–6^{(7–3)}	40
2003
36.	(Switzerland) Roger Federer	4	Indian Wells, United States	Hard	2R	7–5, 7–6^{(7–3)}	24
2004
37.	(Switzerland) Roger Federer	**1**	French Open, Paris, France	Clay	3R	6–4, 6–4, 6–4	30
38.	(United Kingdom) Tim Henman	5	Toronto, Canada	Hard	2R	7–5, 6–4	23

=== Doubles ===
==== Wins per season ====
Season	1995	1996	1997	1998	1999	2000	2001	2002	2003	2004	2005	2006	2007	2008	**Total**
Wins	0	0	1	0	2	0	0	3	1	0	0	0	0	0	**7**

#	Partner	Opponents	Rank	Event	Surface	Rd	Score	GK rank
**1997**
1.	(Brazil) Fernando Meligeni	(Russia) Yevgeny Kafelnikov (Russia) Andrei Olhovskiy	8; 19	Stuttgart, Germany	Clay	QF	6–2, 6–7, 6–1	75
**1999**
2.	(Ecuador) Nicolás Lapentti	(Australia) Todd Woodbridge (Australia) Mark Woodforde	5; 6	Adelaide, Australia	Hard	1R	6–4, 1–2 ret.	94
3.	(Ecuador) Nicolás Lapentti	(South Africa) Ellis Ferreira (United States) Rick Leach	9; 11	Miami, United States	Hard	3R	6–4, 6–4	66
**2002**
4.	(Brazil) Andre Sá	(Canada) Simon Larose (Canada) Daniel Nestor	247; **1**	Davis Cup, Rio de Janeiro, Brazil	Clay	RR	4–6, 7–6^{(7–5)}, 6–1, 4–6, 6–2	147
5.	(France) Cédric Pioline	(The Bahamas) Mark Knowles (Canada) Daniel Nestor	2; **1**	Paris, France	Carpet (i)	QF	6–4, 7–6^{(7–3)}	144
6.	(France) Cédric Pioline	(Sweden) Jonas Björkman (Australia) Todd Woddbridge	6; 5	Paris, France	Carpet (i)	SF	6–7^{(8–10)}, 6–4, 6–3	144
**2003**
7.	(Brazil) Andre Sá	(Sweden) Jonas Björkman (Sweden) Magnus Larsson	6; 310	Davis Cup, Helsingborg, Sweden	Carpet (i)	RR	6–4, 2–6, 5–7, 6–2, 6–2	87

== Longest winning streaks ==
=== Singles ===
==== 26-match win streak on clay (2000–2001) ====
During this streak, Kuerten won every category of tournament played on clay at the time: Grand Slam, Masters Series, ATP International Series Gold, ATP International Series, and Davis Cup.

No.	Tournament	Start date (tournament)	Surface	Opponent	Rank	Round	Score
–	Rome, Italy	8 May 2000	Clay	(Sweden) Magnus Norman	4	F	3–6, 6–4, 4–6, 4–6
1	Hamburg, Germany	15 May 2000	Clay	(Morocco) Karim Alami	28	1R	5–7, 6–2, 6–3
2	Hamburg, Germany	15 May 2000	Clay	(France) Sébastien Grosjean	30	2R	6–1, 3–6, 6–3
3	Hamburg, Germany	15 May 2000	Clay	(South Africa) Wayne Ferreira	25	3R	6–1, 6–2
4	Hamburg, Germany	15 May 2000	Clay	(Sweden) Magnus Norman	4	QF	6–4, 6–2
5	Hamburg, Germany	15 May 2000	Clay	(Romania) Andrei Pavel	67	SF	6–3, 6–3
6	Hamburg, Germany	15 May 2000	Clay	(Russia) Marat Safin	18	F	6–4, 5–7, 6–4, 5–7, 7–6^{(7–3)}
7	Paris, France	29 May 2000	Clay	(Sweden) Andreas Vinciguerra	42	1R	6–0, 6–0, 6–3
8	Paris, France	29 May 2000	Clay	(Argentina) Marcelo Charpentier	230	2R	7–6^{(7–5)}, 6–2, 6–2
9	Paris, France	29 May 2000	Clay	(United States) Michael Chang	44	3R	6–3, 6–7^{(9–11)}, 6–1, 6–4
10	Paris, France	29 May 2000	Clay	(Ecuador) Nicolás Lapentti	15	4R	6–3, 6–4, 7–6^{(7–4)}
11	Paris, France	29 May 2000	Clay	(Russia) Yevgeny Kafelnikov	4	QF	6–3, 3–6, 4–6, 6–4, 6–2
12	Paris, France	29 May 2000	Clay	(Spain) Juan Carlos Ferrero	11	SF	7–5, 4–6, 2–6, 6–4, 6–3
13	Paris, France	29 May 2000	Clay	(Sweden) Magnus Norman (2)	3	F	6–2, 6–3, 2–6, 7–6^{(8–6)}
14	Davis Cup, Rio de Janeiro, Brazil	5 February 2001	Clay	(Morocco) Karim Alami (2)	65	RR	6–7^{(4–7)}, 6–4, 3–6, 6–1, 6–2
15	Davis Cup, Rio de Janeiro, Brazil	5 February 2001	Clay	(Morocco) Mounir El Aarej	346	RR	6–2, 6–2
16	Buenos Aires, Argentina	19 February 2001	Clay	(Australia) Richard Fromberg	95	1R	6–2, 7–6^{(7–3)}
17	Buenos Aires, Argentina	19 February 2001	Clay	(Czech Republic) Jiří Vaněk	82	2R	6–2, 6–4
18	Buenos Aires, Argentina	19 February 2001	Clay	(Argentina) Guillermo Cañas	195	QF	0–6, 6–1, 6–2
19	Buenos Aires, Argentina	19 February 2001	Clay	(Spain) Fernando Vicente	36	SF	4–6, 6–2, 6–2
20	Buenos Aires, Argentina	19 February 2001	Clay	(Argentina) José Acasuso	172	F	6–1, 6–3
21	Acapulco, Mexico	26 February 2001	Clay	(Spain) Félix Mantilla	112	1R	6–4, 6–1
22	Acapulco, Mexico	26 February 2001	Clay	(Brazil) Alexandre Simoni	119	2R	6–4, 6–0
23	Acapulco, Mexico	26 February 2001	Clay	(Brazil) Fernando Meligeni	100	QF	6–7^{(3–7)}, 6–3, 3–2 ret.
24	Acapulco, Mexico	26 February 2001	Clay	(Argentina) Guillermo Cañas (2)	207	SF	6–1, 6–4
25	Acapulco, Mexico	26 February 2001	Clay	(Spain) Galo Blanco	116	F	6–4, 6–2
26	Davis Cup, Florianópolis, Brazil	2 April 2001	Clay	(Australia) Patrick Rafter	8	RR	4–6, 6–4, 7–6^{(7–1)}, 2–1 ret.
–	Davis Cup, Florianópolis, Brazil	2 April 2001	Clay	(Australia) Lleyton Hewitt	7	RR	6–7^{(5–7)}, 3–6, 6–7^{(3–7)}

== ATP Tour career earnings ==
Year	Majors	ATP wins	Total wins	Earnings ($)	Money list rank
1995	0	0	0		
1996	0	0	0		
1997	1	0	1		7
1998	0	2	2		
1999	0	2	2		6
2000	1	4	5		1
2001	1	5	6		1
2002	0	1	1		
2003	0	2	2		
2004	0	1	1		
2005	0	0	0		
2006	0	0	0		
2007	0	0	0		
2008	0	0	0		
Career	3	17	20		

== Career Grand Slam tournament seedings ==
The tournaments won by Kuerten are bolded.

=== Singles ===
Legend seeded No. 1 (**1** / 3) seeded No. 2 (0 / 2) seeded No. 3 (0 / 0) seeded No. 4–10 (**1** / 8) Seeded outside the top 10 (0 / 10) not seeded (**1** / 8) qualifier(0 / 1) wild card (0 / 1) lucky loser (0 / 0) alternate (0 / 0) special exempt (0 / 0) protected ranking(0 / 0)	Longest streak 2 1 0 4 6 3 1 1 0 0 0 0

Year	Australian Open	French Open	Wimbledon	US Open
1995	did not play	did not play	did not play	did not play
1996	did not play	qualifier	did not play	did not play
1997	not seeded	**not seeded**	11th	9th
1998	12th	8th	not seeded	not seeded
1999	not seeded	8th	11th	5th
2000	5th	**5th**	4th	2nd
2001	1st	**1st**	did not play	1st
2002	2nd	7th	did not play	not seeded
2003	30th	15th	17th	14th
2004	19th	28th	did not play	20th
2005	did not play	not seeded	did not play	not seeded
2006	did not play	did not play	did not play	did not play
2007	did not play	did not play	did not play	did not play
2008	did not play	wild card		

== Career milestone wins ==
=== Singles ===
#	Date	Age	Player	Event	Surface	Rd	Score
1.	April 1996	19 years, 6 months	(Venezuela) Nicolás Pereira	**Davis Cup Americas Zone I Second Round, Santos, Brazil**	Clay	RR	6–2, 6–7, 6–1, 6–2
100.	April 1999	22 years, 6 months	(Spain) Carlos Moyá	**Davis Cup World Group First Round, Lérida, Spain**	Clay	RR	6–2, 6–4, 6–1
200.	December 2000	24 years, 3 months	(United States) Pete Sampras	**Tennis Masters Cup, Lisbon, Portugal**	Hard (i)	SF	6–7^{(5–7)}, 6–3, 6–4
300.	March 2003	26 years, 6 months	(Croatia) Goran Ivanišević	Indian Wells, United States	Hard	1R	6–2, 6–4

- Bold indicates that he went on to win the event.
