= 1999 Majorca Open – Singles =

Singles
- 1999 Majorca Open

Final
- Champion: (Spain) Juan Carlos Ferrero
- Runner-up: (Spain) Àlex Corretja
- Score: 2–6, 7–5, 6–3

Details
- Draw: 32
- Seeds: 8

Events
| Singles | Doubles |
| ← 1998 · | Majorca Open | · 2000 → |

== Seeds ==
A champion seed is indicated in bold text while text in italics indicates the round in which that seed was eliminated.

1. (Spain) Carlos Moyà (first round)
2. (Spain) Àlex Corretja (final)
3. (Spain) Álbert Costa (first round)
4. (Slovakia) Dominik Hrbatý (semifinals)
5. (Spain) Francisco Clavet (quarterfinals)
6. (Spain) Fernando Vicente (first round)
7. (Germany) Rainer Schüttler (second round)
8. (Argentina) Franco Squillari (second round)

== Draw ==
=== Key ===
- Q = Qualifier
- WC = Wild card
- LL = Lucky loser
- Alt = Alternate
- ITF = ITF entry
- PR = Protected ranking
- SR = Special ranking
- SE = Special exempt
- JE = Junior exempt
- JR = Junior Accelerator Programme entrant
- CO = College Accelerator Programme entrant
- NG = Next Gen Accelerator Program entrant
- w/o = Walkover
- r = Retired
- d = Defaulted

First round
1 | (Spain) C Moyà | **6** | 3 | 3
Q | (Spain) **J Balcells** | 4 | **6** | **6**
Q | (Spain) **J Alonso** | **6** | 6^{5} | **7^{8}**
(Germany) O Gross | 4 | **7^{7}** | 6^{6}
(Costa Rica) **J A Marín** | **7^{7}** | **6**
Q | (Spain) R Carretero | 6^{4} | 0
(Spain) A Berasategui | 6^{6} | 5
WC/7 | (Germany) **R Schüttler** | **7^{8}** | **7**
3 | (Spain) Á Costa | 3 | **7^{7}** | 3
(Bulgaria) **O Stanoytchev** | **6** | 6^{3} | **6**
WC | (Spain) T Robredo | 4 | 3
(Spain) **J C Ferrero** | **6** | **6**
(Germany) **J Knippschild** | **6** | 5 | **6**
(Spain) G Blanco | 3 | **7** | 2
(Spain) A Portas | **6** | 6^{3} | 4
5 | (Spain) **F Clavet** | 3 | **7^{7}** | **6**
6 | (Spain) F Vicente | 3 | **7** | 4
(Spain) **J A Viloca** | **6** | 5 | **6**
(Austria) **M Hipfl** | **7** | **6**
(Argentina) G Gaudio | 5 | 1
(Argentina) **M Puerta** | **6** | **6**
WC | (Spain) C Costa | 4 | 1
(Spain) G Puentes | **7** | 5 | 1
4 | (Slovakia) **D Hrbatý** | 5 | **7** | **6**
8 | (Argentina) **F Squillari** | **6** | **7**
(Uruguay) M Filippini | 3 | 5
(Argentina) **H Gumy** | **7^{17}** | 4 | **7**
Q | (Spain) Á Calatrava | 6^{15} | **6** | 5
(Argentina) M Rodríguez | 6^{4} | 2
(Spain) **A Martín** | **7^{7}** | **6**
(Germany) D Prinosil | 4 | 1
2 | (Spain) **À Corretja** | **6** | **6**

Second round
Q | (Spain) J Balcells | 6^{6} | 4
Q | (Spain) **J Alonso** | **7^{8}** | **6**
(Costa Rica) **J A Marín** | **6** | **6**
WC/7 | (Germany) R Schüttler | 3 | 1
(Bulgaria) O Stanoytchev | 3 | 6^{4}
(Spain) **J C Ferrero** | **6** | **7^{7}**
(Germany) J Knippschild | **7^{7}** | 4 | 4
5 | (Spain) **F Clavet** | 6^{3} | **6** | **6**
(Spain) J A Viloca | 4 | 0
(Austria) **M Hipfl** | **6** | **6**
(Argentina) M Puerta | 6^{5} | 3
4 | (Slovakia) **D Hrbatý** | **7^{7}** | **6**
8 | (Argentina) F Squillari | 6^{4} | 3
(Argentina) **H Gumy** | **7^{7}** | **6**
(Spain) A Martín | 1 | 2
2 | (Spain) **À Corretja** | **6** | **6**

Quarterfinals
Q | (Spain) **J Alonso** | **7^{7}** | **7**
(Costa Rica) J A Marín | 6^{5} | 5
(Spain) **J C Ferrero** | **6** | **6**
5 | (Spain) F Clavet | 3 | 3
(Austria) M Hipfl | **6** | 5 | 3
4 | (Slovakia) **D Hrbatý** | 4 | **7** | **6**
(Argentina) H Gumy | 3 | 2
2 | (Spain) **À Corretja** | **6** | **6**

Semifinals
Q | (Spain) J Alonso | 2 | 6^{11}
(Spain) **J C Ferrero** | **6** | **7^{13}**
4 | (Slovakia) D Hrbatý | 4 | 4
2 | (Spain) **À Corretja** | **6** | **6**

Final
(Spain) **J C Ferrero** | 2 | **7** | **6**
2 | (Spain) Àlex Corretja | **6** | 5 | 3
