= 2002 Majorca Open – Singles =

Singles
- 2002 Majorca Open

Final
- Champion: (Argentina) Gastón Gaudio
- Runner-up: (Finland) Jarkko Nieminen
- Score: 6–2, 6–3

Details
- Draw: 32
- Seeds: 8

Events
Singles	Doubles
- Majorca Open

Gastón Gaudio defeated Jarkko Nieminen in the final, 6–2, 6–3 to win the singles title at the 2002 Majorca Open.

Alberto Martín was the defending champion, but chose not to compete.

This tournament is notable for being the first ATP Tour event to feature future 22-time major champion and world No. 1 Rafael Nadal, who is from Mallorca. Nadal won his first match against Ramón Delgado at the age of 15 years and 10 months, becoming the ninth player in history to win an ATP Tour match before turning 16.

== Seeds ==
A champion seed is indicated in bold text while text in italics indicates the round in which that seed was eliminated.

1. (Brazil) Gustavo Kuerten (quarterfinals)
2. (Spain) Albert Portas (first round)
3. (Netherlands) Sjeng Schalken (first round)
4. (Finland) Jarkko Nieminen (final)
5. (Argentina) Agustín Calleri (semifinals)
6. (Spain) Albert Montañés (second round)
7. (Slovakia) Dominik Hrbatý (quarterfinals)
8. (Argentina) **Gastón Gaudio (champion)**

== Draw ==
Key

- Q = Qualifier
- WC = Wild card
- LL = Lucky loser
- Alt = Alternate
- ITF = ITF entry
- PR = Protected ranking
- SR = Special ranking
- SE = Special exempt
- JE = Junior exempt
- JR = Junior Accelerator Programme entrant
- CO = College Accelerator Programme entrant
- NG = Next Gen Accelerator Program entrant
- w/o = Walkover
- r = Retired
- d = Defaulted

First round
WC/1	(Brazil) **G Kuerten**	**6**	**6**
(Russia) N Davydenko	2	3
Q	(Spain) M Albert-Ferrando	3	4
Q	(Sweden) **M Norman**	**6**	**6**
(France) **C Pioline**	**6**	6^{4}	**6**
(Argentina) J Acasuso	3	**7^{7}**	4
(Spain) F Vicente	**6**	3	2
WC/8	(Argentina) **G Gaudio**	0	**6**	**6**
3	(Netherlands) S Schalken	2	**6**	5
(Belgium) **O Rochus**	**6**	3	**7**
WC	(Spain) **R Nadal**	**6**	**6**
(Paraguay) R Delgado	4	4
(France) A Dupuis	5	4
(Spain) **J Balcells**	**7**	**6**
(Austria) M Hipfl	0	2
5	(Argentina) **A Calleri**	**6**	**6**
7	(Slovakia) **D Hrbatý**	**6**	1
SE	(Argentina) G Coria	0	0^{r}
(Denmark) K Pless	6^{7}	**6**	2
(Belgium) **C Rochus**	**7^{9}**	2	**6**
(South Korea) H-T Lee	3	3
(Spain) **G Blanco**	**6**	**6**
(Brazil) A Sá	1	2
4	(Finland) **J Nieminen**	**6**	**6**
6	(Spain) **A Montañés**	6^{5}	**7^{7}**	**6**
(United States) M Russell	**7^{7}**	6^{5}	4
(Thailand) P Srichaphan	2	4
(Spain) **D Sánchez**	**6**	**6**
Q	(France) **J-F Bachelot**	**6**	**6**
Q	(Croatia) M Radić	4	2
(Argentina) **M Zabaleta**	**6**	**6**
2	(Spain) A Portas	1	4

Second round
WC/1	(Brazil) **G Kuerten**	**6**	5	**6**
Q	(Sweden) M Norman	1	**7**	3
(France) C Pioline	1	3
WC/8	(Argentina) **G Gaudio**	**6**	**6**
(Belgium) **O Rochus**	**6**	**6**
WC	(Spain) R Nadal	2	2
(Spain) J Balcells	3	1
5	(Argentina) **A Calleri**	**6**	**6**
7	(Slovakia) **D Hrbatý**	**6**	**6**
(Belgium) C Rochus	4	4
(Spain) G Blanco	0	3
4	(Finland) **J Nieminen**	**6**	**6**
6	(Spain) A Montañés	6^{5}	4
(Spain) **D Sánchez**	**7^{7}**	**6**
Q	(France) J-F Bachelot	**6**	5	0
(Argentina) **M Zabaleta**	4	**7**	**6**

Quarterfinals
WC/1	(Brazil) G Kuerten	5	0
WC/8	(Argentina) **G Gaudio**	**7**	**6**
(Belgium) O Rochus	3	**6**	1
5	(Argentina) **A Calleri**	**6**	0	**6**
7	(Slovakia) D Hrbatý	4	6^{2}
4	(Finland) **J Nieminen**	**6**	**7^{7}**
(Spain) D Sánchez	5	3
(Argentina) **M Zabaleta**	**7**	**6**

Semifinals
WC/8	(Argentina) **G Gaudio**	4	**6**	**6**
5	(Argentina) A Calleri	**6**	3	2
4	(Finland) **J Nieminen**	**6**	**6**
(Argentina) M Zabaleta	1	3

Final
WC/8	(Argentina) **Gastón Gaudio**	**6**	**6**
4	(Finland) Jarkko Nieminen	2	3
