= 1997 Marbella Open =

- Date: 8–15 September
- Edition: 3rd
- Category: World Series
- Draw: 32S / 16D
- Prize money: $303,000
- Surface: Clay / outdoor
- Location: Marbella, Spain

Champions

Singles
- (Spain) Álbert Costa

Doubles
- (Morocco) Karim Alami / (Spain) Julián Alonso
← 1996 ·	Marbella Open	· 1998 →

The 1997 Marbella Open was a men's Association of Tennis Professionals tennis tournament held in Marbella, Spain. It was the third edition of the tournament and was held from 8 September until 15 September 1997. First-seeded Álbert Costa won the singles title.

== Finals ==
=== Singles ===
(Spain) Álbert Costa defeated (Spain) Alberto Berasategui 6–3, 6–2

- It was Costa's 2nd title of the year and the 6th of his career.

=== Doubles ===
(Morocco) Karim Alami / (Spain) Julián Alonso defeated (Spain) Alberto Berasategui / (Spain) Jordi Burillo 4–6, 6–3, 6–0

- It was Alami's only title of the year and the 3rd of his career. It was Alonso's 2nd title of the year and the 2nd of his career.
