= 1995 Valencia Open – Doubles =

Doubles
- 1995 Valencia Open

Final
- Champions: (Spain) Tomás Carbonell (Spain) Francisco Roig
- Runners-up: (Netherlands) Tom Kempers (United States) Jack Waite
- Score: 7–5, 6–3

Details
- Draw: 16
- Seeds: 4

Events
Singles	Doubles
Valencia Open	· 1996 →

This was the first edition of the event

Tomás Carbonell and Francisco Roig won in the final 7–5, 6–3, against Tom Kempers and Jack Waite.

== Seeds ==
1. (Spain) Tomás Carbonell / (Spain) Francisco Roig (champions)
2. (Spain) Sergio Casal / (Spain) Emilio Sánchez (first round)
3. (Netherlands) Hendrik Jan Davids / (South Africa) Piet Norval (quarterfinals)
4. (Belgium) Libor Pimek / (South Africa) Byron Talbot (first round)

== Draw ==
=== Key ===
- Q = Qualifier
- WC = Wild card
- LL = Lucky loser
- Alt = Alternate
- ITF = ITF entry
- PR = Protected ranking
- SR = Special ranking
- SE = Special exempt
- JE = Junior exempt
- JR = Junior Accelerator Programme entrant
- CO = College Accelerator Programme entrant
- NG = Next Gen Accelerator Program entrant
- w/o = Walkover
- r = Retired
- d = Defaulted

=== Draw ===
First round
1	(Spain) T Carbonell (Spain) F Roig	6	6
(Spain) J Arrese (Spain) JA Conde	3	3
(Australia) W Arthurs (South Africa) M Ondruska	7	6
(Austria) A Antonitsch (Netherlands) T Nijssen	5	1
4	(Belgium) L Pimek (South Africa) B Talbot	4	4
(Czech Republic) K Nováček (Netherlands) S Schalken	6	6
Q	(Spain) E Benfele Álvarez (Spain) J Imaz-Ruiz	3	6	4
WC	(Spain) C Costa (Spain) O Martinez	6	3	6
LL	(Spain) Á Calatrava (Spain) A Portas	1	6
(United States) B Behrens (United States) M Lucena	6	7
WC	(Spain) J Muñoz (Spain) JA Viloca-Puig	3	1
3	(Netherlands) H Jan Davids (South Africa) P Norval	6	6
(South Africa) B Haygarth (United States) K Kinnear	6	7
WC	(Spain) A Berasategui (Spain) Á Corretja	4	6
(Netherlands) T Kempers (United States) J Waite	7	7
2	(Spain) S Casal (Spain) E Sánchez	6	6

Quarterfinals
1	(Spain) T Carbonell (Spain) F Roig	6	6
(Australia) W Arthurs (South Africa) M Ondruska	4	3
(Czech Republic) K Nováček (Netherlands) S Schalken	6	6
WC	(Spain) C Costa (Spain) O Martinez	3	2
(United States) B Behrens (United States) M Lucena	6	6	6
3	(Netherlands) H Jan Davids (South Africa) P Norval	7	3	4
(South Africa) B Haygarth (United States) K Kinnear	2	1
(Netherlands) T Kempers (United States) J Waite	6	6

Semifinals
1	(Spain) T Carbonell (Spain) F Roig	6	6
(Czech Republic) K Nováček (Netherlands) S Schalken	3	2
(United States) B Behrens (United States) M Lucena	3	5
(Netherlands) T Kempers (United States) J Waite	6	7

Final
1	(Spain) T Carbonell (Spain) F Roig	7	6
(Netherlands) T Kempers (United States) J Waite	5	3
