= 1998 Majorca Open – Doubles =

Doubles
- 1998 Majorca Open

Final
- Champions: (Argentina) Pablo Albano (Argentina) Daniel Orsanic
- Runners-up: (Czech Republic) Jiří Novák (Czech Republic) David Rikl
- Score: 7–6, 6–3

Details
- Draw: 16
- Seeds: 4

Events
Singles	Doubles
← 1997 ·	Majorca Open	· 1999 →

Karim Alami and Julián Alonso were the defending champions, but did not participate together this year. Alami did not participate this year. Alonso partnered Carlos Moyá, losing in the first round.

Pablo Albano and Daniel Orsanic won in the final 7–6, 6–3, against Jiří Novák and David Rikl.

== Seeds ==
1. (Argentina) Luis Lobo / (Spain) Javier Sánchez (first round)
2. (Czech Republic) Jiří Novák / (Czech Republic) David Rikl (final)
3. (Spain) Tomás Carbonell / (Spain) Francisco Roig (quarterfinals)
4. (Argentina) Pablo Albano / (Argentina) Daniel Orsanic (champions)

== Draw ==
=== Key ===
- Q = Qualifier
- WC = Wild card
- LL = Lucky loser
- Alt = Alternate
- ITF = ITF entry
- PR = Protected ranking
- SR = Special ranking
- SE = Special exempt
- JE = Junior exempt
- JR = Junior Accelerator Programme entrant
- CO = College Accelerator Programme entrant
- NG = Next Gen Accelerator Program entrant
- w/o = Walkover
- r = Retired
- d = Defaulted

=== Draw ===
First round
1	(Argentina) L Lobo (Spain) J Sánchez	6	3
(South Africa) P Rosner (United Kingdom) D Sapsford	7	6
(Brazil) G Kuerten (Brazil) F Meligeni	6	6
(United States) B Coupe (United States) J Waite	4	1
4	(Argentina) P Albano (Argentina) D Orsanic	6	6
(United States) D Bowen (Argentina) M Puerta	1	3
(South Africa) M Barnard (Russia) A Olhovskiy	6	6
WC	(Spain) S Bruguera (Spain) C Costa	4	3
(South Africa) L Bale (South Africa) P Norval	6	6	6
WC	(Spain) A Berasategui (Spain) A Costa	2	7	2
WC	(Spain) J Alonso (Spain) C Moyá	1	6	4
3	(Spain) T Carbonell (Spain) F Roig	6	3	6
(Serbia and Montenegro) N Djordjevic (Czech Republic) T Anzari	3	6	6
(Australia) P Kilderry (Ecuador) N Lapentti	6	1	4
Q	(Spain) Carlos Martinez-Comet (Serbia and Montenegro) D Vemić	2	2
2	(Czech Republic) J Novák (Czech Republic) D Rikl	6	6

Quarterfinals
(South Africa) P Rosner (United Kingdom) D Sapsford	w/o
(Brazil) G Kuerten (Brazil) F Meligeni
4	(Argentina) P Albano (Argentina) D Orsanic	6	7
(South Africa) M Barnard (Russia) A Olhovskiy	3	6
(South Africa) L Bale (South Africa) P Norval	6	3	6
3	(Spain) T Carbonell (Spain) F Roig	4	6	1
(Serbia and Montenegro) N Djordjevic (Czech Republic) T Anzari	6	1
2	(Czech Republic) J Novák (Czech Republic) D Rikl	7	6

Semifinals
(South Africa) P Rosner (United Kingdom) D Sapsford	2	3
4	(Argentina) P Albano (Argentina) D Orsanic	6	6
(South Africa) L Bale (South Africa) P Norval	4	6	3
2	(Czech Republic) J Novák (Czech Republic) D Rikl	6	3	6

Final
4	(Argentina) P Albano (Argentina) D Orsanic	7	6
2	(Czech Republic) J Novák (Czech Republic) D Rikl	6	3
