= 1998 Majorca Open – Singles =

Singles
- 1998 Majorca Open

Final
- Champion: (Brazil) Gustavo Kuerten
- Runner-up: (Spain) Carlos Moyà
- Score: 6–7^{(5–7)}, 6–2, 6–3

Details
- Draw: 32
- Seeds: 8

Events
Singles	Doubles
← 1997 ·	Majorca Open	· 1999 →

== Seeds ==
A champion seed is indicated in bold text while text in italics indicates the round in which that seed was eliminated.

1. (Spain) Carlos Moyà (final)
2. (Spain) Àlex Corretja (second round)
3. (Spain) Álbert Costa (second round)
4. (Spain) Alberto Berasategui (second round)
5. (Austria) Thomas Muster (semifinals)
6. (Sweden) Magnus Gustafsson (first round)
7. (Spain) Francisco Clavet (first round)
8. (Brazil) **Gustavo Kuerten (champion)**

== Draw ==
=== Key ===
- Q = Qualifier
- WC = Wild card
- LL = Lucky loser
- Alt = Alternate
- ITF = ITF entry
- PR = Protected ranking
- SR = Special ranking
- SE = Special exempt
- JE = Junior exempt
- JR = Junior Accelerator Programme entrant
- CO = College Accelerator Programme entrant
- NG = Next Gen Accelerator Program entrant
- w/o = Walkover
- r = Retired
- d = Defaulted

First round
1	(Spain) **C Moyà**	**6**	**7^{13}**
Q	(Romania) I Moldovan	4	6^{11}
(Czech Republic) **S Doseděl**	**6**	**6**
(Spain) C Costa	3	3
(Russia) M Safin	**7^{8}**	4	6^{6}
Q	(Austria) **T Schiessling**	6^{6}	**6**	**7^{8}**
Q	(Federal Republic of Yugoslavia) **D Vemić**	**7**	4	**6**
7	(Spain) F Clavet	5	**6**	2
3	(Spain) **Á Costa**	**6**	**6**
(Australia) A Ilie	1	3
(Spain) **F Vicente**	**6**	1
(Spain) J Alonso	1	1^{r}
WC	(Spain) J Sánchez	3	**7^{7}**	4
(Argentina) **M Puerta**	**6**	6^{5}	**6**
LL	(Spain) **T Carbonell**	**6**	4	**6**
6	(Sweden) M Gustafsson	3	**6**	4
5	(Austria) **T Muster**	**6**	**6**
WC	(Spain) G Blanco	4	2
(Romania) A Pavel	2	**6**	4
(Costa Rica) **J A Marín**	**6**	3	**6**
(Czech Republic) B Ulihrach	1	**6**	2
(Germany) **T Haas**	**6**	3	**6**
(Ecuador) N Lapentti	2	4
4	(Spain) **A Berasategui**	**6**	**6**
8	(Brazil) **G Kuerten**	**7^{7}**	1
(Belgium) J van Herck	6^{4}	0^{r}
(Argentina) F Squillari	3	1
Q	(Spain) **O Serrano**	**6**	**6**
(Czech Republic) J Novák	3	3
WC	(Spain) **S Bruguera**	**6**	**6**
(Slovakia) D Hrbatý	**7**	3	3
2	(Spain) **À Corretja**	5	**6**	**6**

Second round
1	(Spain) **C Moyà**	**6**	**6**
(Czech Republic) S Doseděl	4	4
Q	(Austria) **T Schiessling**	4	**6**	**6**
Q	(Federal Republic of Yugoslavia) D Vemić	**6**	4	3
3	(Spain) Á Costa	6^{5}	**6**	3
(Spain) **F Vicente**	**7^{7}**	4	**6**
(Argentina) M Puerta	6^{6}	**6**	1
LL	(Spain) **T Carbonell**	**7^{8}**	1	**6**
5	(Austria) **T Muster**	**6**	**6**
(Costa Rica) J A Marín	3	2
(Germany) **T Haas**	5	**6**	**6**
4	(Spain) A Berasategui	**7**	1	4
8	(Brazil) **G Kuerten**	**6**	**6**
Q	(Spain) O Serrano	1	1
WC	(Spain) **S Bruguera**	**7^{7}**	**6**
2	(Spain) À Corretja	6^{5}	3

Quarterfinals
1	(Spain) **C Moyà**	**7**	**6**
Q	(Austria) T Schiessling	5	4
(Spain) **F Vicente**	3	**7^{8}**	**6**
LL	(Spain) T Carbonell	**6**	6^{6}	4
5	(Austria) **T Muster**	3	**6**	**6**
(Germany) T Haas	**6**	3	4
8	(Brazil) **G Kuerten**	**6**	**6**
WC	(Spain) S Bruguera	4	4

Semifinals
1	(Spain) **C Moyà**	**6**	**6**
(Spain) F Vicente	1	2
5	(Austria) T Muster	5	5
8	(Brazil) **G Kuerten**	**7**	**7**

Final
1	(Spain) Carlos Moyà	**7^{7}**	2	3
8	(Brazil) **Gustavo Kuerten**	6^{5}	**6**	**6**
