= 1996 Marbella Open – Doubles =

Doubles
- 1996 Marbella Open

Final
- Champions: (Australia) Andrew Kratzmann (United States) Jack Waite
- Runners-up: (Argentina) Pablo Albano (Argentina) Lucas Arnold
- Score: 6–7, 6–3, 6–4

Details
- Draw: 16
- Seeds: 4

Events
Singles	Doubles
← 1995 ·	Marbella Open	· 1997 →

Tomás Carbonell and Francisco Roig were the defending champions but were defeated in the quarterfinals by Pablo Albano and Lucas Arnold.

Andrew Kratzmann and Jack Waite won in the final 6–7, 6–3, 6–4 against Albano and Arnold.

== Seeds ==
Champion seeds are indicated in bold text while text in italics indicates the round in which those seeds were eliminated.

1. (Argentina) Luis Lobo / (Spain) Javier Sánchez (quarterfinals)
2. (Spain) Tomás Carbonell / (Spain) Francisco Roig (quarterfinals)
3. (United States) Donald Johnson / (United States) Francisco Montana (first round)
4. (Netherlands) Hendrik Jan Davids / (Netherlands) Stephen Noteboom (first round)

== Draw ==
=== Key ===
- Q = Qualifier
- WC = Wild card
- LL = Lucky loser
- Alt = Alternate
- ITF = ITF entry
- PR = Protected ranking
- SR = Special ranking
- SE = Special exempt
- JE = Junior exempt
- JR = Junior Accelerator Programme entrant
- CO = College Accelerator Programme entrant
- NG = Next Gen Accelerator Program entrant
- w/o = Walkover
- r = Retired
- d = Defaulted

First round
1	(Argentina) **L Lobo** (Spain) **J Sánchez**	**6**	**6**
(United States) S Cannon (United States) T.J. Middleton	3	3
(Spain) **À Corretja** (Spain) **E Sánchez**	**6**	**6**
WC	(Spain) J A Conde (Spain) J Muñoz	4	0
4	(Netherlands) H J Davids (Netherlands) S Noteboom	6	**7**	5
(Netherlands) **T Kempers** (Netherlands) **T Nijssen**	**7**	6	**7**
(Australia) **A Kratzmann** (United States) **J Waite**	**6**	**6**
WC	(Spain) A Costa (Spain) C Moyá	1	3
WC	(Spain) F Clavet (Spain) C Costa	3	3
(United States) **B Behrens** (Germany) **M-K Goellner**	**6**	**6**
(South Africa) **B Haygarth** (United States) **G Van Emburgh**	**6**	4	**6**
3	(United States) D Johnson (United States) F Montana	2	**6**	4
Q	(Australia) J Ireland (Argentina) D Orsanic	3	1
(Argentina) **P Albano** (Argentina) **L Arnold**	**6**	**6**
(Portugal) E Couto (Portugal) N Marques	2	1
2	(Spain) **T Carbonell** (Spain) **F Roig**	**6**	**6**

Quarterfinals
1	(Argentina) L Lobo (Spain) J Sánchez	3	4
(Spain) **À Corretja** (Spain) **E Sánchez**	**6**	**6**
(Netherlands) T Kempers (Netherlands) T Nijssen	6	6
(Australia) **A Kratzmann** (United States) **J Waite**	**7**	**7**
(United States) **B Behrens** (Germany) **M-K Goellner**	**6**	**6**
(South Africa) B Haygarth (United States) G Van Emburgh	4	0
(Argentina) **P Albano** (Argentina) **L Arnold**	**7**	**6**
2	(Spain) T Carbonell (Spain) F Roig	5	1

Semifinals
(Spain) À Corretja (Spain) E Sánchez	6	6
(Australia) **A Kratzmann** (United States) **J Waite**	**7**	**7**
(United States) B Behrens (Germany) M-K Goellner	6	6
(Argentina) **P Albano** (Argentina) **L Arnold**	**7**	**7**

Final
(Australia) **A Kratzmann** (United States) **J Waite**	6	**6**	**6**
(Argentina) P Albano (Argentina) L Arnold	**7**	3	4
