= 2002 Majorca Open – Doubles =

Doubles
- 2002 Majorca Open

Final
- Champions: (India) Mahesh Bhupathi (India) Leander Paes
- Runners-up: (Austria) Julian Knowle (Germany) Michael Kohlmann
- Score: 6–2, 6–4

Details
- Draw: 16
- Seeds: 4

Events
Singles	Doubles
← 2001 ·	Majorca Open	· 2003 →

Donald Johnson and Jared Palmer were the defending champions but did not compete that year.

Mahesh Bhupathi and Leander Paes won in the final 6–2, 6–4 against Julian Knowle and Michael Kohlmann.

== Seeds ==
Champion seeds are indicated in bold text while text in italics indicates the round in which those seeds were eliminated.

1. (India) **Mahesh Bhupathi** / (India) **Leander Paes (champions)**
2. (Netherlands) Sjeng Schalken / (Zimbabwe) Kevin Ullyett (quarterfinals)
3. (Argentina) Lucas Arnold / (Argentina) Gastón Etlis (quarterfinals)
4. (South Africa) David Adams / (Sweden) Simon Aspelin (quarterfinals)

== Draw ==
=== Key ===
- Q = Qualifier
- WC = Wild card
- LL = Lucky loser
- Alt = Alternate
- SE = Special exempt
- PR = Protected ranking
- ITF = ITF entry
- JE = Junior exempt
- w/o = Walkover
- r = Retired
- d = Defaulted
- SR = Special ranking

First round
1	(India) **M Bhupathi** (India) **L Paes**	**6**	6^{6}	**[10]**
(North Macedonia) A Kitinov (Sweden) J Landsberg	4	**7^{8}**	[7]
(Australia) **S Huss** (South Africa) **M Wakefield**	**6**	**6**
(Slovakia) D Hrbatý (Spain) A Portas	3	3
3	(Argentina) **L Arnold** (Argentina) **G Etlis**	**6**	**6**
(Germany) K Braasch (Russia) A Olhovskiy	4	3
(Australia) **M Hill** (Czech Republic) **D Vacek**	**7**	**7^{7}**
WC	(Spain) A Montañés (Spain) G Puentes	5	6^{4}
(Brazil) **G Kuerten** (Brazil) **A Sá**	**6**	4	**[10]**
(South Africa) C Haggard (Belgium) T Vanhoudt	3	**6**	[8]
WC	(Spain) R Nadal (Spain) B Salvá Vidal	2	2
4	(South Africa) **D Adams** (Sweden) **S Aspelin**	**6**	**6**
WC	(Spain) J Balcells (Spain) F López	**6**	6^{5}	[10]
(Austria) **J Knowle** (Germany) **M Kohlmann**	2	**7^{7}**	**[12]**
(South Africa) M Barnard (United States) J Thomas	6^{3}	5
2	(Netherlands) **S Schalken** (Zimbabwe) **K Ullyett**	**7^{7}**	**7**

Quarterfinals
1	(India) **M Bhupathi** (India) **L Paes**	**6**	**6**
(Australia) S Huss (South Africa) M Wakefield	4	3
3	(Argentina) L Arnold (Argentina) G Etlis	6^{7}	6^{5}
(Australia) **M Hill** (Czech Republic) **D Vacek**	**7^{9}**	**7^{7}**
(Brazil) **G Kuerten** (Brazil) **A Sá**	2	**6**	**[10]**
4	(South Africa) D Adams (Sweden) S Aspelin	**6**	2	[7]
(Austria) **J Knowle** (Germany) **M Kohlmann**	**7^{7}**	3	**[10]**
2	(Netherlands) S Schalken (Zimbabwe) K Ullyett	6^{3}	**6**	[5]

Semifinals
1	(India) **M Bhupathi** (India) **L Paes**	**6**	**6**
(Australia) M Hill (Czech Republic) D Vacek	4	2
(Brazil) G Kuerten (Brazil) A Sá	1	2
(Austria) **J Knowle** (Germany) **M Kohlmann**	**6**	**6**

Final
1	(India) **M Bhupathi** (India) **L Paes**	**6**	**6**
(Austria) J Knowle (Germany) M Kohlmann	2	4
