= 1997 Torneo Godó – Doubles =

Doubles
- 1997 Torneo Godó

Final
- Champions: (Spain) Alberto Berasategui (Spain) Jordi Burillo
- Runners-up: (Argentina) Pablo Albano (Spain) Àlex Corretja
- Score: 6–3, 7–5

Details
- Draw: 28
- Seeds: 8

Events
Singles	Doubles
- Barcelona Open

The 1997 Torneo Godó was a men's tennis tournament played on clay courts in Barcelona, Spain that was part of the International Series Gold of the 1997 ATP Tour. It was the 45th edition of the tournament and was held from 14–21 April.

== Seeds ==
Champion seeds are indicated in bold text while text in italics indicates the round in which those seeds were eliminated.

1. (Argentina) Luis Lobo / (Spain) Javier Sánchez (quarterfinals)
2. (Belgium) Libor Pimek / (South Africa) Byron Talbot (semifinals)
3. (United Kingdom) Neil Broad / (South Africa) Piet Norval (second round)
4. (Netherlands) Menno Oosting / (Netherlands) Jan Siemerink (semifinals)
5. (Spain) Tomás Carbonell / (Spain) Francisco Roig (quarterfinals)
6. (United States) Trevor Kronemann / (Australia) David Macpherson (first round)
7. (United States) Donald Johnson / (United States) Francisco Montana (quarterfinals)
8. (Netherlands) Hendrik Jan Davids / (Germany) Marc-Kevin Goellner (first round)

== Draw ==
Key

- Q = Qualifier
- WC = Wild card
- LL = Lucky loser
- Alt = Alternate
- ITF = ITF entry
- PR = Protected ranking
- SR = Special ranking
- SE = Special exempt
- JE = Junior exempt
- JR = Junior Accelerator Programme entrant
- CO = College Accelerator Programme entrant
- NG = Next Gen Accelerator Program entrant
- w/o = Walkover
- r = Retired
- d = Defaulted

=== Finals ===
Semifinals
(Argentina) **Pablo Albano** **(Spain) Àlex Corretja**	**6**	**6**
4	(Netherlands) Menno Oosting (Netherlands) Jan Siemerink	4	2
(Spain) **Alberto Berasategui** **(Spain) Jordi Burillo**	**7**	**6**
2	(Belgium) Libor Pimek (South Africa) Byron Talbot	6	2

Final
(Argentina) Pablo Albano (Spain) Àlex Corretja	3	5
(Spain) **Alberto Berasategui** **(Spain) Jordi Burillo**	**6**	**7**

=== Top half ===
First round
(United States) **D Randall** **(United States) J Waite**	**6**	4	**7**
(North Macedonia) A Kitinov (Hungary) G Köves	3	**6**	5
(Argentina) **P Albano** **(Spain) À Corretja**	**6**	**6**
(Spain) F Clavet (Spain) F Mantilla	1	3
(Brazil) **G Kuerten** **(Brazil) F Meligeni**	3	**6**	**6**
8	(Netherlands) HJ Davids (Germany) M-K Goellner	**6**	4	4
(Sweden) **D Ekerot** **(United States) TJ Middleton**	3	**6**	**6**
(Spain) A Costa (Spain) C Moyá	**6**	4	2
(Spain) **J Alonso** **(Spain) J Balcells**	**7**	4	**6**
(Italy) C Brandi (Italy) A Gaudenzi	6	**6**	3
(Slovakia) **D Hrbatý** **(Slovakia) K Kučera**	3	**7**	**7**
6	(United States) T Kronemann (Australia) D Macpherson	**6**	6	6

Second round
1	(Argentina) **L Lobo** **(Spain) J Sánchez**	**6**	**6**
(United States) D Randall (United States) J Waite	3	4
(Argentina) **P Albano** **(Spain) À Corretja**	**6**	**6**
(Brazil) G Kuerten (Brazil) F Meligeni	2	3
4	(Netherlands) **M Oosting** **(Netherlands) J Siemerink**	**6**	3	**6**
(Sweden) D Ekerot (United States) TJ Middleton	3	**6**	**6**
(Spain) **J Alonso** **(Spain) J Balcells**	4	**7**	**7**
(Slovakia) D Hrbatý (Slovakia) K Kučera	**6**	5	6

Quarterfinals
1	(Argentina) L Lobo (Spain) J Sánchez	6	3
(Argentina) **P Albano** **(Spain) À Corretja**	**7**	**6**
4	(Netherlands) **M Oosting** **(Netherlands) J Siemerink**	**6**	**6**
(Spain) J Alonso (Spain) J Balcells	3	3

Semifinals
(Argentina) **P Albano** **(Spain) À Corretja**	**6**	**6**
4	(Netherlands) M Oosting (Netherlands) J Siemerink	4	2

=== Bottom half ===
First round
5	(Spain) **T Carbonell** **(Spain) F Roig**	**6**	5	**7**
(Netherlands) S Noteboom (Sweden) P Nyborg	4	**7**	6
(Ukraine) **A Medvedev** **(Chile) M Ríos**	**6**	**6**
(Morocco) K Alami (Netherlands) S Schalken	3	4
(Spain) **A Berasategui** **(Spain) J Burillo**	6	**6**	**7**
(South Africa) M Barnard (South Africa) W Ferreira	**7**	1	5
7	(United States) **D Johnson** **(United States) F Montana**	**7**	**6**
(United States) M Keil (United States) G Van Emburgh	5	2
(Germany) **P Baur** **(Germany) J Knippschild**	**6**	4	**7**
(Socialist Federal Republic of Yugoslavia) N Djordjevic (South Africa) B Haygarth	4	**6**	6
(Ecuador) **N Lapentti** **(Spain) E Sánchez**	**6**	**6**
(Latvia) Ģ Dzelde (Russia) Y Kafelnikov	1	1

Second round
5	(Spain) **T Carbonell** **(Spain) F Roig**	**6**	**6**
(Ukraine) A Medvedev (Chile) M Ríos	3	3
(Spain) **A Berasategui** **(Spain) J Burillo**	**6**	**7**
3	(United Kingdom) N Broad (South Africa) P Norval	4	5
7	(United States) **D Johnson** **(United States) F Montana**	**6**	4	**6**
(Germany) P Baur (Germany) J Knippschild	3	**6**	2
(Ecuador) N Lapentti (Spain) E Sánchez	6	4
2	(Belgium) **L Pimek** **(South Africa) B Talbot**	**7**	**6**

Quarterfinals
5	(Spain) T Carbonell (Spain) F Roig	6	6
(Spain) **A Berasategui** **(Spain) J Burillo**	**7**	**7**
7	(United States) D Johnson (United States) F Montana	**6**	2	3
2	(Belgium) **L Pimek** **(South Africa) B Talbot**	4	**6**	**6**

Semifinals
(Spain) **A Berasategui** **(Spain) J Burillo**	**7**	**6**
2	(Belgium) L Pimek (South Africa) B Talbot	6	2
