= 1996 Marbella Open =

- Date: 30 September – 6 October
- Edition: 2nd
- Category: ATP World Series
- Draw: 32S / 16D
- Prize money: $303,000
- Surface: Clay / outdoor
- Location: Marbella, Spain
- Venue: Club de Tenis Puente Romano

Champions

Singles
- (Germany) Marc-Kevin Goellner

Doubles
- (Australia) Andrew Kratzmann / (United States) Jack Waite
← 1995 ·	Marbella Open	· 1997 →

The 1996 Marbella Open was a men's tennis tournament played on the outdoor clay courts at Club de Tenis Puente Romano in Marbella, Spain and was part of the World Series of the 1996 ATP Tour. It was the second edition of the tournament (after being held in Valencia the previous year) and was held from 30 September until 6 October 1996. Unseeded Marc-Kevin Goellner won the singles title.

== Finals ==
=== Singles ===
(Germany) Marc-Kevin Goellner defeated (Spain) Àlex Corretja 7–6^{(7–4)}, 7–6^{(7–2)}

- It was Goellner's 1st singles title of the year and the 2nd and last of his career.

=== Doubles ===
(Australia) Andrew Kratzmann / (United States) Jack Waite defeated (Argentina) Pablo Albano / (Argentina) Lucas Arnold 6–7, 6–3, 6–4

- It was Kratzmann's 2nd title of the year and the 4th of his career. It was Waite's 2nd title of the year and the 3rd of his career.
