= 1998 Majorca Open =

- Date: 28 September – 5 October
- Edition: 4th
- Category: World Series
- Draw: 32S / 16D
- Prize money: $425,000
- Surface: Clay / outdoor
- Location: Mallorca, Spain

Champions

Singles
- (Brazil) Gustavo Kuerten

Doubles
- (Argentina) Pablo Albano / (Argentina) Daniel Orsanic
- Majorca Open

The 1998 Majorca Open was an Association of Tennis Professionals men's tennis tournament played on outdoor clay courts in Mallorca, Spain that was part of the World Series category of the 1998 ATP Tour. It was the fourth edition of the tournament and was held from 28 September to 5 October 1998. Eighth-seeded Gustavo Kuerten won the singles title.

== Finals ==
=== Singles ===
(Brazil) Gustavo Kuerten defeated (Spain) Carlos Moyà 6–7^{(5–7)}, 6–2, 6–3

- It was Kuerten's 2nd singles title of the year and the 3rd of his career.

=== Doubles ===
(Argentina) Pablo Albano / (Argentina) Daniel Orsanic defeated (Czech Republic) Jiří Novák / (Czech Republic) David Rikl 7–6, 6–3

- It was Albano's only title of the year and the 7th of his career. It was Orsanic's 2nd title of the year and the 5th of his career.
