= Thomas Schiessling =

Austrian tennis player

- Country (sports): Austria
- Born: 1 November 1974 (age 50); Innsbruck, Austria
- Height: 1.80 m (5 ft 11 in)
- Turned pro: 1994
- Plays: Left-handed
- Prize money: $83,192

Singles
- Career record: 4–9
- Career titles: 0
- Highest ranking: No. 257 (14 December 1998)

Grand Slam singles results
- French Open: Q2 (1997)

Doubles
- Career record: 0–0
- Career titles: 0
- Highest ranking: No. 894 (3 May 1995)
- Last updated on: 24 December 2022.

Thomas Schiessling (born 1 November 1974) is an Austrian former professional tennis player.

A left-handed player from Innsbruck, Schiessling turned professional in 1994 and reached a career best singles ranking of 257 in the world. Most of his ATP Tour main draw appearances came at his home tournament, the Austrian Open Kitzbühel, but he had his best performance at Mallorca in 1998, beating Marat Safin en route to the quarter-finals.

Schiessling now trades stocks for a living.

== ATP Challenger and ITF Futures finals ==
=== Singles: 13 (7–6) ===
Legend ATP Challenger (0–0) ITF Futures (7–6)	Finals by surface Hard (0–0) Clay (7–6) Grass (0–0) Carpet (0–0)

Result	W–L	Date	Tournament	Tier	Surface	Opponent	Score
Loss	0–1	Jul 1998	Austria F4, Seefeld	Futures	Clay	(Czech Republic) Petr Dezort	7–5, 2–6, 6–7
Loss	0–2	Jul 1998	Austria F5, Schwaz	Futures	Clay	(Argentina) Hector Moretti	6–0, 4–6, 4–6
Win	1–2	Aug 1998	Austria F7, Vienna	Futures	Clay	(Austria) Michel Kratochvil	6–3, 6–4
Win	2–2	Nov 1998	Brazil F6, Curitiba	Futures	Clay	(Brazil) Paulo Taicher	6–1, 6–3
Win	3–2	Dec 1998	Brazil F7, Pouso Alegre	Futures	Clay	(Brazil) Marcos Daniel	6–0, 7–6
Loss	3–3	May 2000	Austria F2, Telfs	Futures	Clay	(Austria) Clemens Trimmel	4–6, 4–6
Win	4–3	Jun 2000	Italy F4, Pavia	Futures	Clay	(Italy) Elia Grossi	2–6, 7–6^{(7–4)}, 7–5
Loss	4–4	Jun 2001	Italy F5, Pavia	Futures	Clay	(Italy) Giorgio Galimberti	2–6, 6–7^{(4–7)}
Loss	4–5	Aug 2003	Austria F3, Seefeld	Futures	Clay	(Czech Republic) Michal Navratil	2–6, 7–6^{(7–5)}, 3–6
Loss	4–6	Jul 2006	Austria F5, Telfs	Futures	Clay	(Austria) Andreas Haider-Maurer	6–0, 3–6, 2–6
Win	5–6	Jul 2006	Austria F6, Kramsach	Futures	Clay	(Germany) Bastian Knittel	6–4, 6–3
Win	6–6	Sep 2006	Germany F14, Nuremberg	Futures	Clay	(Germany) Marc Sieber	6–0, 6–0
Win	7–6	Jul 2007	Austria F5, Telfs	Futures	Clay	(Austria) Armin Sandbichler	7–6^{(12–10)}, 6–2

=== Doubles: 1 (1–0) ===
Legend ATP Challenger (0–0) ITF Futures (1–0)	Finals by surface Hard (0–0) Clay (1–0) Grass (0–0) Carpet (0–0)

Result	W–L	Date	Tournament	Tier	Surface	Partner	Opponents	Score
Win	1–0	Nov 1998	Brazil F5, Florianópolis	Futures	Clay	(Germany) Paul Hartveg	(Brazil) Daniel Melo (Brazil) Antonio Prieto	walkover
