= Vaughan Snyman =

South African tennis player

- Country (sports): South Africa
- Born: 30 January 1974 (age 51) Port Elizabeth, South Africa
- Prize money: $33,087

Singles
- Highest ranking: No. 404 (21 July 1997)

Grand Slam singles results
- Australian Open: Q3 (1997)
- Wimbledon: Q2 (1998)

Doubles
- Career record: 1–1
- Highest ranking: No. 160 (20 September 1999)

Vaughan Snyman (born 30 January 1974) is a South African former professional tennis player.

Born in Port Elizabeth, Snyman played collegiate tennis in the United States, for the University of Alabama at Birmingham. He was a singles All-American in 1994 and twice earned All-American honours for doubles, forming a top ranked doubles partnership with countryman Paul Rosner.

Snyman competed on the professional tour after graduating from college in 1995. His highlights include featuring in the singles qualifying draws of the 1997 Australian Open and 1998 Wimbledon Championships. He won two doubles titles on the ATP Challenger Tour and his only ATP Tour main draw appearance also came in doubles, at the 1999 Majorca Open, where he and partner Marcus Hilpert won through to the quarter-finals.

== Challenger titles ==
=== Doubles: (2) ===
No.	Date	Tournament	Surface	Partner	Opponents	Score
1.	July 1999	Newcastle, Great Britain	Clay	(Germany) Marcus Hilpert	(United States) Hugo Armando (France) Cedric Kauffmann	7–5, 7–6
2.	August 1999	Edinburgh, Great Britain	Clay	(Germany) Marcus Hilpert	(Spain) Marcos Roy-Girardi (Hungary) Attila Sávolt	6–1, 7–6^{(7–3)}
