= 1995 Valencia Open =

- Date: 2–9 October
- Edition: 1st
- Category: ATP World Series
- Draw: 32S / 16D
- Prize money: $203,000
- Surface: Clay / outdoor
- Location: Valencia, Spain

Champions

Singles
- (Netherlands) Sjeng Schalken

Doubles
- (Spain) Tomás Carbonell / (Spain) Francisco Roig
Valencia Open	· 1996 →

The 1995 Valencia Open was an Association of Tennis Professionals men's tennis tournament held in Valencia, Spain and played on outdoor clay courts. It was the inaugural edition of the tournament which was held from 2 October until 9 October 1995 and was part of the ATP World Series of the 1995 ATP Tour. Unseeded Sjeng Schalken won the singles title.

== Finals ==
=== Singles ===
(Netherlands) Sjeng Schalken defeated (Austria) Gilbert Schaller 6–4, 6–2

- It was Schalken's only singles title of the year and the first of his career.

=== Doubles ===
(Spain) Tomás Carbonell / (Spain) Francisco Roig defeated (Netherlands) Tom Kempers / (United States) Jack Waite 7–5, 6–3

- It was Carbonell's 4th title of the year and the 16th of his career. It was Roig's 4th title of the year and the 8th of his career.
