= Marcus Hilpert =

German tennis player (born 1971)

- Country (sports): Germany
- Born: 1 July 1971 (age 54) Delhi, India
- Plays: Right-handed
- Prize money: $80,965

Singles
- Career record: 1–2
- Career titles: 0
- Highest ranking: No. 343 (24 June 1996)

Doubles
- Career record: 4–13
- Career titles: 0
- Highest ranking: No. 141 (6 November 2000)

Marcus Hilpert (born 1 July 1971) is a former professional tennis player from Germany.

== Early years ==
Hilpert was born in India, to a Khasi Indian mother and German father. His father worked as a diplomat, so Hilpert also lived in Indonesia, Sri Lanka and Sudan during his childhood. Despite his mother being an Indian national, Hilpert wasn't eligible to represent the country of his birth in Davis Cup tennis as he only held a German passport.

He later studied at the University of Arkansas and was an NCAA singles semi-finalist in 1994.

== Tour career ==
Hilpert was a doubles quarter-finalist in the 1999 Majorca Open (with Vaughan Snyman) and at San Marino in 2000, partnering Jens Knippschild. His best singles performance was a second round appearance in 1997 at the Washington D.C. tournament, where he had a win over Reed Cordish.

The German won three ATP Challenger doubles titles in the late 1990s.

He now competes on the seniors circuit under the flag of the Netherlands.

== Challenger titles ==
=== Doubles ===
| No. | Year | Tournament | Surface | Partner | Opponents | Score |
|---|---|---|---|---|---|---|
| 1. | 1996 | Azores, Portugal | Hard | (Germany) Christian Saceanu | (United Kingdom) Jamie Delgado (United States) Charlie Singer | 6–7, 6–2, 6–4 |
| 2. | 1999 | Newcastle, Great Britain | Clay | (South Africa) Vaughan Snyman | (United States) Hugo Armando (France) Cedric Kauffmann | 7–5, 7–6 |
| 3. | 1999 | Edinburgh, Great Britain | Clay | (South Africa) Vaughan Snyman | (Spain) Marcos Roy-Girardi (Hungary) Attila Sávolt | 6–1, 7–6^{(7–3)} |
