= Mariano Albert-Ferrando =

Spanish tennis player (born 1982)

- Country (sports): Spain
- Born: 26 April 1982 (age 43)
- Plays: Right-handed
- Prize money: $59,235

Singles
- Career record: 0–1
- Highest ranking: No. 178 (14 July 2003)

Grand Slam singles results
- French Open: Q2 (2003)
- Wimbledon: Q1 (2002, 2003)

Doubles
- Highest ranking: No. 333 (11 November 2002)

Mariano Albert-Ferrando (born 26 April 1982) is a former professional tennis player from Spain.

Albert-Ferrando, a right-handed player, made his only ATP Tour main draw appearance at the 2002 Majorca Open. He featured in the main draw as a qualifier and was beaten in the first round by Magnus Norman.

In 2003 he won a Challenger tournament in Sassuolo, beating Renzo Furlan in the final.

== Challenger titles ==
=== Singles: (1) ===
Year	Tournament	Surface	Opponent	Score
2003	Sassuolo, Italy	Clay	(Italy) Renzo Furlan	7–6^{(1)}, 6–3
