= Rubén Fernández-Gil =

Spanish tennis player (born 1978)

- Country (sports): Spain
- Born: 12 January 1978 (age 47)
- Prize money: $21,244

Singles
- Career record: 0–1
- Highest ranking: No. 505 (23 Apr 2001)

Doubles
- Career record: 0–1
- Highest ranking: No. 454 (19 Apr 1999)

Rubén Fernández-Gil (born 12 January 1978) is a Spanish former professional tennis player.

Fernández-Gil made his only ATP Tour main draw appearance at the 1997 Marbella Open and lost his first round match in three sets to Bernd Karbacher. On the ATP Challenger circuit, he was a doubles finalist at Segovia in 1998 and a singles quarter-finalist at Geneva in 2000. He had best world rankings of 505 in singles and 454 in doubles.

== ATP Challenger finals ==
=== Doubles: 1 (0–1) ===
Result	No.	Date	Tournament	Surface	Partner	Opponents	Score
Loss	1.	Aug 1998	Segovia, Spain	Hard	(Spain) Pepe Conde	(Czech Republic) Radek Štěpánek (Czech Republic) Tomáš Zíb	3–6, 6–7
