= 1999 Majorca Open =

- Date: 13 – 20 September
- Edition: 5th
- Category: ATP World Series
- Draw: 32S / 16D
- Prize money: $500,000
- Surface: Clay / outdoor
- Location: Mallorca, Spain

Champions

Singles
- (Spain) Juan Carlos Ferrero

Doubles
- (Argentina) Lucas Arnold Ker / (Spain) Tomás Carbonell
- Majorca Open

The 1999 Majorca Open was an Association of Tennis Professionals tennis tournament played on outdoor clay courts in Mallorca, Spain. The event was part of the ATP World Series of the 1999 ATP Tour and was held from 13 September to 20 September 1999. Unseeded Juan Carlos Ferrero won the singles title.

== Finals ==
=== Singles ===
(Spain) Juan Carlos Ferrero defeated (Spain) Àlex Corretja 2–6, 7–5, 6–3

- It was Ferrero's only title of the year and the 1st of his career.

=== Doubles ===
(Argentina) Lucas Arnold Ker / (Spain) Tomás Carbonell defeated (Spain) Alberto Berasategui / (Spain) Francisco Roig 6–1, 6–4

- It was Arnold Ker's 1st title of the year and the 2nd of his career. It was Carbonell's 1st title of the year and the 19th of his career.
