= Sergio Gómez Barrio =

Spanish tennis player (born 1970)

- Country (sports): Spain
- Born: 16 October 1970 (age 54); Marbella, Spain
- Prize money: $17,077

Singles
- Career record: 0–2
- Highest ranking: No. 334 (18 Oct 1993)

Grand Slam singles results
- Wimbledon: Q1 (1994)
- US Open: Q1 (1993)

Doubles
- Career record: 0–2
- Highest ranking: No. 222 (29 Aug 1994)

Sergio Gómez Barrio (born 16 October 1970) is a Spanish former professional tennis player.

Born in Marbella, Gómez Barrio competed on the professional tour in the 1990s and reached a career high singles world ranking of 334. He qualified for the main draw of two ATP Tour tournaments, the Suisse Open in 1993 and the Marbella Open in 1997. His career also included qualifying draw appearances at the US Open and Wimbledon.

Gómez Barrio is director of the Bel-Air Tennis Club in Málaga.
