= 2002 Majorca Open =

Tennis tournament

- Date: 29 April – 5 May
- Edition: 8th
- Category: International Series
- Draw: 32S / 16D
- Prize money: $356,000
- Surface: Clay
- Location: Mallorca, Spain

Champions

Singles
- (Argentina) Gastón Gaudio

Doubles
- (India) Mahesh Bhupathi / (India) Leander Paes
- Majorca Open

The 2002 Majorca Open was a men's tennis tournament played on outdoor clay courts in Mallorca, Spain and was part of the International Series of the 2002 ATP Tour. It was the eighth edition of the tournament and was held from 29 April through 5 May 2002. Eighth-seeded Gastón Gaudio won the singles title.

== Finals ==
=== Singles ===
(Argentina) Gastón Gaudio defeated (Finland) Jarkko Nieminen 6–2, 6–3

- It was Gaudio's 2nd title of the year and the 2nd of his career.

=== Doubles ===
(India) Mahesh Bhupathi / (India) Leander Paes defeated (Austria) Julian Knowle / (Germany) Michael Kohlmann 6–2, 6–4

- It was Bhupathi's 2nd title of the year and the 23rd of his career. It was Paes's 2nd title of the year and the 26th of his career.
