= Pablo Albano =

Argentine tennis player

- Country (sports): Argentina
- Residence: Buenos Aires, Argentina
- Born: 11 April 1967 (age 59) Buenos Aires, Argentina
- Height: 1.78 m (5 ft 10 in)
- Turned pro: 1986
- Retired: 2001 (brief activity in 2012–2013)
- Plays: Right-handed
- Prize money: $933,810

Singles
- Career record: 2–8
- Career titles: 0
- Highest ranking: No. 192 (6 August 1990)

Grand Slam singles results
- Australian Open: Q1 (1992)
- French Open: Q2 (1993)
- Wimbledon: Q2 (1991)
- US Open: 1R (1992)

Doubles
- Career record: 211–219
- Career titles: 9
- Highest ranking: No. 25 (9 June 1997)

Grand Slam doubles results
- Australian Open: 3R (1998)
- French Open: SF (1992, 1999)
- Wimbledon: QF (1991)
- US Open: 2R (1995, 1997, 1999, 2000)

Pablo Albano (Spanish pronunciation: [ˈpaβlo alˈβano]; born 11 April 1967) is a former professional tennis player from Argentina.

Albano enjoyed most of his tennis success while playing doubles. During his career, he won 9 doubles titles. He achieved a career-high doubles ranking of World No. 25 in 1997.

== Career finals ==
=== Doubles: 18 (9 wins / 9 losses) ===
| Result | W-L | Date | Tournament | Surface | Partner | Opponents | Score |
|---|---|---|---|---|---|---|---|
| Loss | 0–1 | Aug 1989 | San Marino | Clay | (Argentina) Gustavo Luza | (Italy) Simone Colombo (Switzerland) Claudio Mezzadri | 4–6, 1–6 |
| Win | 1–1 | Sep 1990 | Geneva, Switzerland | Clay | (Sweden) David Engel | (Australia) Neil Borwick (New Zealand) David Lewis | 6–3, 7–6 |
| Win | 2–1 | Sep 1993 | Bordeaux, France | Hard | (Argentina) Javier Frana | (South Africa) David Adams (Russia) Andrei Olhovskiy | 7–6, 4–6, 6–3 |
| Loss | 2–2 | Nov 1993 | São Paulo, Brazil | Clay | (Argentina) Javier Frana | (Spain) Sergio Casal (Spain) Emilio Sánchez | 6–4, 6–7, 4–6 |
| Loss | 2–3 | Aug 1995 | San Marino | Clay | (Italy) Federico Mordegan | (Spain) Jordi Arrese (Australia) Andrew Kratzmann | 6–7, 6–3, 2–6 |
| Win | 3–3 | Aug 1996 | San Marino | Clay | (Argentina) Lucas Arnold Ker | (Argentina) Mariano Hood (Argentina) Sebastián Prieto | 6–1, 6–3 |
| Win | 4–3 | Aug 1996 | Umag, Croatia | Clay | (Argentina) Luis Lobo | (Latvia) Ģirts Dzelde (Austria) Udo Plamberger | 6–4, 6–1 |
| Loss | 4–4 | Oct 1996 | Marbella, Spain | Clay | (Argentina) Lucas Arnold Ker | (Australia) Andrew Kratzmann (United States) Jack Waite | 7–6, 3–6, 4–6 |
| Win | 5–4 | Mar 1997 | Milan, Italy | Carpet | (Sweden) Peter Nyborg | (South Africa) David Adams (Russia) Andrei Olhovskiy | 6–4, 7–6 |
| Loss | 5–5 | Apr 1997 | Barcelona, Spain | Clay | (Spain) Àlex Corretja | (Spain) Alberto Berasategui (Spain) Jordi Burillo | 3–6, 5–7 |
| Win | 6–5 | May 1997 | Munich, Germany | Clay | (Spain) Àlex Corretja | (Germany) Karsten Braasch (Germany) Jens Knippschild | 3–6, 7–5, 6–2 |
| Win | 7–5 | Oct 1998 | Mallorca, Spain | Clay | (Argentina) Daniel Orsanic | (Czech Republic) Jiří Novák (Czech Republic) David Rikl | 7–6, 6–3 |
| Loss | 7–6 | Oct 1998 | Palermo, Italy | Clay | (Argentina) Daniel Orsanic | (United States) Donald Johnson (United States) Francisco Montana | 4–6, 6–7 |
| Win | 8–6 | Mar 2000 | Bogotá, Colombia | Clay | (Argentina) Lucas Arnold Ker | (Spain) Juan Balcells (Colombia) Mauricio Hadad | 7–6, 1–6, 6–2 |
| Win | 9–6 | Jul 2000 | Kitzbühel, Austria | Clay | (Czech Republic) Cyril Suk | (Australia) Joshua Eagle (Australia) Andrew Florent | 6–3, 3–6, 6–3 |
| Loss | 9–7 | Oct 2000 | Palermo, Italy | Clay | (Germany) Marc-Kevin Goellner | (Spain) Tomás Carbonell (Argentina) Martín García | W/O |
| Loss | 9–8 | Apr 2001 | Casablanca, Morocco | Clay | (Australia) David Macpherson | (Australia) Michael Hill (United States) Jeff Tarango | 6–7, 3–6 |
| Loss | 9–9 | Sep 2001 | Bucharest, Romania | Clay | (Germany) Marc-Kevin Goellner | (North Macedonia) Aleksandar Kitinov (Sweden) Johan Landsberg | 4–6, 7–6, [6–10] |
