= Jordi Burillo =

Spanish tennis player (born 1972)

- Country (sports): Spain
- Residence: Mataró, Spain
- Born: 7 December 1972 (age 53) Barcelona, Spain
- Height: 1.87 m (6 ft 1 1/2 in)
- Turned pro: 1991
- Plays: Right-handed (two-handed backhand)
- Prize money: $1,198,126

Singles
- Career record: 92–129
- Career titles: 1
- Highest ranking: No. 43 (22 April 1996)

Grand Slam singles results
- Australian Open: 2R (1998)
- French Open: 1R (1994, 1997, 1998)
- Wimbledon: 3R (1994)
- US Open: 2R (1994)

Doubles
- Career record: 31–43
- Career titles: 1
- Highest ranking: No. 100 (2 February 1998)

Grand Slam doubles results
- Australian Open: 1R (1998)
- French Open: 3R (1998)
- Wimbledon: 1R (1998)

Jordi Burillo Puig (Spanish: [ˈɟʝoɾði βuˈɾiʎo ˈpwiɣ], Catalan: [ˈʒɔɾði βuˈɾiʎu ˈputʃ]; (Note: In isolation, Burillo is pronounced [buˈɾiʎo] in Spanish and [buˈɾiʎu] in Catalan.) born 7 December 1972) is a retired tennis player from Spain. He won one singles title and a doubles title on the ATP Tour in his career. His style was very aggressive and powerful, hitting always the ball and serving very hard.

He won the title in Bologna and played the final of Florence in 1993. In 1995, he played his last final of ATP level until his retirement, in Palermo. In 1997, Burillo won the Open Castilla y León, considered best Challenger of the world by this date. And, this year, the court was so fast (and consequently his game, and his hits) that only Francisco Clavet (semifinals) could end his match against Burillo. All his other rivals in the tournament gave up due to injuries.

His more notable victories include Boris Becker (1992, clay) and Mark Philippoussis (1998, grass). After retiring from professional tennis, he became Julián Alonso's coach.

His father, Àngel Burillo Mínguez, played basketball in Spain's top division representing CE Mataró.

== ATP career finals ==
=== Singles: 3 (1 title, 2 runner-ups) ===
Legend
Grand Slam (0–0)
Tennis Masters Cup (0–0)
ATP Masters Series (0–0)
ATP Tour (1–2)

Result	W/L	Date	Tournament	Surface	Opponent	Score
Win	1–0	May 1993	Bologna, Italy	Clay	(Russia) Andrei Cherkasov	7–6^{(7–4)}, 6–7^{(7–9)}, 6–1
Loss	1–1	Jun 1993	Florence, Italy	Clay	(Austria) Thomas Muster	1–6, 5–7
Loss	1–2	Sep 1995	Palermo, Italy	Clay	(Spain) Francisco Clavet	7–6^{(7–2)}, 3–6, 6–7^{(1–7)}

=== Doubles: 3 (1 title, 2 runner-ups) ===
Legend
Grand Slam (0)
Tennis Masters Cup (0)
ATP Masters Series (0)
ATP Tour (1)

Result	W/L	Date	Tournament	Surface	Partner	Opponents	Score
Loss	0–1	Aug 1990	San Marino, San Marino	Clay	(Spain) Marcos Górriz	(Czechoslovakia) Vojtěch Flégl (Czechoslovakia) Daniel Vacek	1–6, 6–4, 6–7
Win	1–1	Apr 1997	Barcelona, Spain	Clay	(Spain) Alberto Berasategui	(Argentina) Pablo Albano (Spain) Àlex Corretja	6–3, 7–5
Loss	1–2	Sep 1997	Marbella, Spain	Clay	(Spain) Alberto Berasategui	(Morocco) Karim Alami (Spain) Julián Alonso	6–4, 3–6, 0–6
