= Alberto Berasategui =

Spanish tennis player (born 1973)

- Country (sports): Spain
- Born: 28 June 1973 (age 52) Bilbao, Spain
- Height: 1.72 m (5 ft 7 1/2 in)
- Turned pro: 1991
- Retired: 2001
- Plays: Right-handed (one-handed backhand)
- Prize money: $4,676,187

Singles
- Career record: 278–199 (58.3%)
- Career titles: 14
- Highest ranking: No. 7 (14 November 1994)

Grand Slam singles results
- Australian Open: QF (1998)
- French Open: F (1994)
- Wimbledon: 1R (2000)
- US Open: 2R (1993, 1996)

Other tournaments
- Tour Finals: RR (1994)
- Grand Slam Cup: 1R (1994)

Doubles
- Career record: 47–59 (44.3%)
- Career titles: 1
- Highest ranking: No. 55 (6 October 1997)

Grand Slam doubles results
- Australian Open: 1R (1998, 2000)
- French Open: 1R (1999)
- US Open: 3R (1997)
- Last updated on: 22 November 2021.

Alberto Berasategui Salazar (born 28 June 1973) is a former top-10 professional tennis player from Spain. He was a Grand Slam finalist at the 1994 French Open, and won a total of 14 ATP singles titles, achieving a career-high singles ranking of world No. 7 in November 1994.

== Tennis career ==
Berasategui won a total of 14 top-level singles titles and one tour doubles title. All of them, as well as all losses in finals, were on clay. He won at least one singles title for six consecutive years (1993–1998). He began playing tennis at age seven and was the European junior champion in 1991. He turned professional later that year, and won his first top-level singles title in 1993, two years later.

In 1994, Berasategui reached nine finals, winning seven of them. He also reached his first Grand Slam final at the French Open, where he defeated Wayne Ferreira, Cédric Pioline, Yevgeny Kafelnikov, Javier Frana, Goran Ivanišević and Magnus Larsson to face fellow Spaniard and defending champion Sergi Bruguera who defeated him in four sets. "Against the unflagging groundstrokes of Bruguera, the 23rd ranked Berasategui finally appeared mortal and he lashed out with 65 unforced errors and lost his serve half a dozen times".

Berasategui retired from the professional tour in May 2001, having had persistent wrist injuries since his match with Hernán Gumy at the Bologna tournament in June 1998. The injuries had an adverse effect on his results and form, and had caused his consistency and ranking to decline. He also suffered severe cramps of unknown origin in long matches.

== Playing style ==
Berasategui was known for his extreme western grip, known as the "Hawaiian grip", where his unusual hold on the racket would allow him to hit both forehands and backhands with the same side of the racket. This helped him on clay, but he did not have much of an impact on other surfaces except for a quarterfinals appearance at the 1998 Australian Open, after having beaten world No. 2, Patrick Rafter in four sets in the third round, and came back from two sets down to beat the 1995 Australian Open champion, former and future world No. 1, Andre Agassi, in the fourth round. He lost in quarterfinals to Marcelo Ríos after winning a tight first-set tiebreak.

== Grand Slam finals ==
=== Singles: 1 (1 runner-up) ===
Result	Year	Championship	Surface	Opponent	Score
Loss	1994	French Open	Clay	(Spain) Sergi Bruguera	3–6, 5–7, 6–2, 1–6

== ATP career finals ==
=== Singles: 23 (14 titles, 9 runner-ups) ===
Legend Grand Slam Tournaments (0–1) ATP World Tour Finals (0–0) ATP Masters Series(0–0) ATP Championship Series (1–1) ATP World Series (13–7)	Finals by surface Hard (0–0) Clay (14–9) Grass (0–0) Carpet (0–0)	Finals by setting Outdoors (14–9) Indoors (0–0)

Result	W–L	Date	Tournament	Tier	Surface	Opponent	Score
Loss	0–1	Aug 1993	Umag, Croatia	World Series	Clay	(Austria) Thomas Muster	5–7, 6–3, 3–6
Loss	0–2	Oct 1993	Athens, Greece	World Series	Clay	(Spain) Jordi Arrese	4–6, 6–3, 3–6
Win	1–2	Nov 1993	São Paulo, Brazil	World Series	Clay	(Czech Republic) Sláva Doseděl	6–4, 6–3
Loss	1–3	Nov 1993	Buenos Aires, Argentina	World Series	Clay	(Spain) Carlos Costa	6–3, 1–6, 4–6
Win	2–3	Apr 1994	Nice, France	World Series	Clay	(United States) Jim Courier	6–4, 6–2
Loss	2–4	May 1994	Bologna, Italy	World Series	Clay	(Spain) Javier Sánchez	6–7^{(3–7)}, 6–4, 3–6
Loss	2–5	Jun 1994	Paris, France	Grand Slam	Clay	(Spain) Sergi Bruguera	3–6, 5–7, 6–2, 1–6
Win	3–5	Jul 1994	Stuttgart, Germany	Championship Series	Clay	(Italy) Andrea Gaudenzi	7–5, 6–3, 7–6^{(7–5)}
Win	4–5	Aug 1994	Umag, Croatia	World Series	Clay	(Slovakia) Karol Kučera	6–2, 6–4
Win	5–5	Oct 1994	Palermo, Italy	World Series	Clay	(Spain) Àlex Corretja	2–6, 7–6^{(8–6)}, 6–4
Win	6–5	Oct 1994	Athens, Greece	World Series	Clay	(Spain) Óscar Martínez	4–6, 7–6^{(7–4)}, 6–3
Win	7–5	Oct 1994	Santiago, Chile	World Series	Clay	(Spain) Francisco Clavet	6–3, 6–4
Win	8–5	Nov 1994	Montevideo, Uruguay	World Series	Clay	(Spain) Francisco Clavet	6–4, 6–0
Win	9–5	Jun 1995	Porto, Portugal	World Series	Clay	(Spain) Carlos Costa	3–6, 6–3, 6–4
Loss	9–6	Nov 1995	Montevideo, Uruguay	World Series	Clay	(Czech Republic) Bohdan Ulihrach	2–6, 3–6
Win	10–6	Jun 1996	Bologna, Italy	World Series	Clay	(Spain) Carlos Costa	6–3, 6–4
Win	11–6	Jul 1996	Kitzbühel, Austria	World Series	Clay	(Spain) Àlex Corretja	6–2, 6–4, 6–4
Win	12–6	Sep 1996	Bucharest, Romania	World Series	Clay	(Spain) Carlos Moyà	6–1, 7–6^{(7–5)}
Loss	12–7	Sep 1997	Marbella, Spain	World Series	Clay	(Spain) Albert Costa	3–6, 2–6
Win	13–7	Oct 1997	Palermo, Italy	World Series	Clay	(Slovakia) Dominik Hrbatý	6–4, 6–2
Win	14–7	Apr 1998	Estoril, Portugal	World Series	Clay	(Austria) Thomas Muster	3–6, 6–1, 6–3
Loss	14–8	Apr 1998	Barcelona, Spain	Championship Series	Clay	(United States) Todd Martin	2–6, 6–1, 3–6, 2–6
Loss	14–9	Oct 1999	Palermo, Italy	World Series	Clay	(France) Arnaud Di Pasquale	1–6, 3–6

=== Doubles: 4 (1 title, 3 runner-ups) ===
Legend Grand Slam Tournaments (0–0) ATP World Tour Finals (0–0) ATP Masters Series(0–0) ATP Championship Series (1–0) ATP World Series (0–3)	Finals by surface Hard (0–0) Clay (1–3) Grass (0–0) Carpet (0–0)	Finals by setting Outdoors (1–3) Indoors (0–0)

Result	W–L	Date	Tournament	Tier	Surface	Partner	Opponents	Score
Win	1–0	Apr 1997	Barcelona, Spain	Championship Series	Clay	(Spain) Jordi Burillo	(Argentina) Pablo Albano (Spain) Àlex Corretja	6–3, 7–5
Loss	1–1	Sep 1997	Marbella, Spain	World Series	Clay	(Spain) Jordi Burillo	(Morocco) Karim Alami (Spain) Julian Alonso	6–4, 3–6, 0–6
Loss	1–2	Sep 1998	Bournemouth, United Kingdom	World Series	Clay	(Australia) Wayne Arthurs	(United Kingdom) Neil Broad (South Africa) Kevin Ullyett	6–7, 3–6
Loss	1–3	Sep 1999	Mallorca, Spain	World Series	Clay	(Spain) Francisco Roig	(Argentina) Lucas Arnold Ker (Spain) Tomas Carbonell	1–6, 4–6

== ATP Challenger and ITF Futures finals ==
=== Singles: 10 (7–3) ===
Legend ATP Challenger (7–3) ITF Futures (0–0)	Finals by surface Hard (0–0) Clay (7–3) Grass (0–0) Carpet (0–0)

Result	W–L	Date	Tournament	Tier	Surface	Opponent	Score
Loss	0–1	Oct 1992	Reggio Calabria, Italy	Challenger	Clay	(Argentina) Roberto Azar	4–6, 2–6
Win	1–1	Feb 1993	Mar del Plata, Argentina	Challenger	Clay	(Argentina) Martin Stringari	6–2, 7–5
Win	2–1	Aug 1993	Graz, Austria	Challenger	Clay	(Spain) Carlos Costa	6–4, 6–3
Win	3–1	Sep 1994	Barcelona, Spain	Challenger	Clay	(Germany) Carl-Uwe Steeb	6–3, 7–5
Win	4–1	Jun 1996	Braunschweig, Germany	Challenger	Clay	(Hungary) Jozsef Krocsko	6–2, 6–2
Win	5–1	Jul 1996	Venice, Italy	Challenger	Clay	(Spain) Javier Sánchez	6–2, 6–2
Loss	5–2	Oct 1996	Cairo, Egypt	Challenger	Clay	(Brazil) Fernando Meligeni	6–3, 1–6, 2–6
Win	6–2	Jun 1997	Zagreb, Croatia	Challenger	Clay	(Croatia) Ivan Ljubicic	6–1, 6–2
Win	7–2	Oct 1997	Cairo, Egypt	Challenger	Clay	(Morocco) Karim Alami	7–5, 6–3
Loss	7–3	Nov 2000	Buenos Aires, Argentina	Challenger	Clay	(Argentina) Guillermo Coria	1–6, 6–4, 4–6

=== Doubles: 1 (1–0) ===
Legend ATP Challenger (1–0) ITF Futures (0–0)	Finals by surface Hard (0–0) Clay (1–0) Grass (0–0) Carpet (0–0)

Result	W–L	Date	Tournament	Tier	Surface	Partner	Opponents	Score
Win	1–0	Oct 1996	Cairo, Egypt	Challenger	Clay	(Spain) German Puentes-Alcaniz	(Slovakia) Branislav Galik (Slovenia) Borut Urh	6–0, 6–0

== Performance timeline ==
Key
W	F	SF	QF	#R	RR	Q#	DNQ	A	NH

(W) winner; (F) finalist; (SF) semifinalist; (QF) quarterfinalist; (#R) rounds 4, 3, 2, 1; (RR) round-robin stage; (Q#) qualification round; (DNQ) did not qualify; (A) absent; (NH) not held; (SR) strike rate (events won / competed); (W–L) win–loss record.

=== Singles ===
Tournament	1992	1993	1994	1995	1996	1997	1998	1999	2000	SR	W–L	Win %
Grand Slam tournaments
Australian Open	A	A	A	A	A	3R	QF	1R	1R	0 / 4	6–4	60%
French Open	1R	2R	F	3R	3R	1R	4R	4R	1R	0 / 9	17–9	65%
Wimbledon	A	A	A	A	A	A	A	A	1R	0 / 1	0–1	0%
US Open	A	2R	1R	A	2R	1R	1R	A	A	0 / 5	2–5	29%
Win–loss	0–1	2–2	6–2	2–1	3–2	2–3	7–3	3–2	0–3	0 / 19	25–19	46%
Year-end Championships
Tennis Masters Cup	DNQ		RR	Did not qualify						0 / 1	0–3	0%
ATP Masters Series
Indian Wells	A	A	1R	3R	1R	QF	1R	1R	A	0 / 6	4–6	40%
Miami	A	A	3R	3R	A	2R	2R	2R	1R	0 / 6	2–6	100%
Monte Carlo	A	A	3R	3R	1R	2R	SF	1R	1R	0 / 7	8–7	53%
Rome	A	A	2R	2R	2R	SF	SF	2R	Q1	0 / 6	11–6	65%
Hamburg	2R	A	1R	2R	2R	QF	3R	3R	A	0 / 7	8–7	53%
Canada	A	A	A	A	2R	A	A	A	A	0 / 1	1–1	50%
Cincinnati	A	A	A	3R	A	A	1R	A	A	0 / 2	2–2	50%
Stuttgart	A	A	A	1R	2R	1R	A	A	A	0 / 3	1–3	25%
Paris	A	A	A	A	3R	1R	A	A	A	0 / 2	2–2	50%
Win–loss	1–1	0–0	4–5	5–7	6–7	11–7	9–6	3–5	0–2	0 / 40	39–40	49%
Year-end Ranking	115	36	8	32	19	23	21	60	153	Career Earnings: $4,676,187		

=== Doubles ===
Tournament	1996	1997	1998	1999	2000	SR	W–L	Win %
Grand Slam tournaments
Australian Open	A	A	1R	A	1R	0 / 2	0–2	0%
French Open	A	A	A	1R	A	0 / 1	0–1	0%
Wimbledon	A	A	A	A	A	0 / 0	0–0	–
US Open	A	3R	A	A	A	0 / 1	2–1	67%
Win–loss	0–0	2–1	0–1	0–1	0–1	0 / 4	2–4	33%
ATP Masters Series
Miami	A	A	1R	A	A	0 / 1	0–1	0%
Monte Carlo	A	A	A	1R	A	0 / 1	0–1	0%
Hamburg	A	QF	2R	A	A	0 / 2	3–2	60%
Rome	Q2	A	A	A	A	0 / 0	0–0	–
Canada	Q2	A	A	A	A	0 / 0	0–0	–
Win–loss	0–0	2–1	1–2	0–1	0–0	0 / 2	3–4	43%
