= Valencia Open =

Coordinates: 39.454°N 0.35°W

Defunct tennis tournament
- Founded: 1995
- Abolished: 2015
- Editions: 21
- Location: Valencia; Spain
- Venue: Ciutat de les Arts i les Ciències
- Category: 250 Series (2015), ATP World Tour 500 series (2009-2014)
- Surface: Hard / indoor
- Draw: 32S / 16Q / 16D
- Prize money: $551,800

The Valencia Open (formerly Open de Tenis Comunidad Valenciana) was a professional tennis tournament, part of the ATP Tour and held in Valencia, Spain until 2015. The event was first played in Valencia in 1995 before moving to the Club de Tenis Puente Romano in Marbella for the 1996 and 1997 editions. From 1998 to 2002, the event was held in Mallorca, and finally, in 2003, moved back to its location in Valencia.

It was an ATP International Series tournament held on outdoor clay courts until 2008. In 2009, the Valencia Open and the Madrid Masters switched calendar dates and surfaces, with the Madrid Masters becoming an outdoor clay court tournament and Valencia getting into the ATP World Tour 500 series category as an indoor hardcourt tournament held in November at the newly opened L'Agora in Ciutat de les Arts i les Ciències. In 2015, the tournament was downgraded to the ATP 250-level and ultimately ended up being the last edition of the event. The tournament sold its 500-level event license to the Vienna Open, which allowed the Vienna event to be upgraded to an ATP 500 status.

== Past finals ==
In singles, David Ferrer has the record for most titles (three) and most finals (five). In doubles, Alexander Peya and Bruno Soares have the record for most wins (two).

=== Singles ===
Location	Year	Champions	Runners-up	Score
Valencia	1995	(Netherlands) Sjeng Schalken	(Austria) Gilbert Schaller	6–4, 6–2
Marbella	1996	(Germany) Marc-Kevin Goellner	(Spain) Àlex Corretja	7–6^{(7–4)}, 7–6^{(7–2)}
Marbella	1997	(Spain) Albert Costa	(Spain) Alberto Berasategui	6–3, 6–2
Mallorca	1998	(Brazil) Gustavo Kuerten	(Spain) Carlos Moyà	6–7^{(5–7)}, 6–2, 6–3
Mallorca	1999	(Spain) Juan Carlos Ferrero	(Spain) Àlex Corretja	2–6, 7–5, 6–3
Mallorca	2000	(Russia) Marat Safin	(Sweden) Mikael Tillström	6–4, 6–3
Mallorca	2001	(Spain) Alberto Martín	(Argentina) Guillermo Coria	6–3, 3–6, 6–2
Mallorca	2002	(Argentina) Gastón Gaudio	(Finland) Jarkko Nieminen	6–2, 6–3
Valencia	2003	(Spain) Juan Carlos Ferrero	(Belgium) Christophe Rochus	6–2, 6–4
Valencia	2004	(Spain) Fernando Verdasco	(Spain) Albert Montañés	7–6^{(7–5)}, 6–3
Valencia	2005	(Russia) Igor Andreev	(Spain) David Ferrer	3–6, 7–5, 6–3
Valencia	2006	(Spain) Nicolás Almagro	(France) Gilles Simon	6–2, 6–3
Valencia	2007	(Spain) Nicolás Almagro	(Italy) Potito Starace	4–6, 6–2, 6–1
Valencia	2008	(Spain) David Ferrer	(Spain) Nicolás Almagro	4–6, 6–2, 7–6^{(7–2)}
Valencia	2009	(United Kingdom) Andy Murray	(Russia) Mikhail Youzhny	6–3, 6–2
Valencia	2010	(Spain) David Ferrer	(Spain) Marcel Granollers	7–5, 6–3
Valencia	2011	(Spain) Marcel Granollers	(Argentina) Juan Mónaco	6–2, 4–6, 7–6^{(7–3)}
Valencia	2012	(Spain) David Ferrer	(Ukraine) Alexandr Dolgopolov	6–1, 3–6, 6–4
Valencia	2013	(Russia) Mikhail Youzhny	(Spain) David Ferrer	6–3, 7–5
Valencia	2014	(United Kingdom) Andy Murray	(Spain) Tommy Robredo	3–6, 7–6^{(9–7)}, 7–6^{(10–8)}
Valencia	2015	(Portugal) João Sousa	(Spain) Roberto Bautista Agut	3–6, 6–3, 6–4

=== Doubles ===
Location	Year	Champions	Runners-up	Score
Valencia	1995	(Spain) Tomás Carbonell (Spain) Francisco Roig	(Netherlands) Tom Kempers (United States) Jack Waite	7–5, 6–3
Marbella	1996	(Australia) Andrew Kratzmann (United States) Jack Waite	(Argentina) Pablo Albano (Argentina) Lucas Arnold Ker	6–7, 6–3, 6–4
Marbella	1997	(Morocco) Karim Alami (Spain) Julian Alonso	(Spain) Alberto Berasategui (Spain) Jordi Burillo	4–6, 6–3, 6–0
Mallorca	1998	(Argentina) Pablo Albano (Argentina) Daniel Orsanic	(Czech Republic) Jiří Novák (Czech Republic) David Rikl	7–6^{(11–9)}, 6–3
Mallorca	1999	(Argentina) Lucas Arnold Ker (Spain) Tomás Carbonell	(Spain) Alberto Berasategui (Spain) Francisco Roig	6–1, 6–4
Mallorca	2000	(France) Michaël Llodra (Italy) Diego Nargiso	(Spain) Alberto Martín (Spain) Fernando Vicente	7–6^{(7–2)}, 7–6^{(7–3)}
Mallorca	2001	(United States) Donald Johnson (United States) Jared Palmer	(Spain) Feliciano López (Spain) Francisco Roig	7–5, 6–3
Mallorca	2002	(India) Mahesh Bhupathi (India) Leander Paes	(Austria) Julian Knowle (Germany) Michael Kohlmann	6–2, 6–4
Valencia	2003	(Argentina) Lucas Arnold Ker (Argentina) Mariano Hood	(United States) Brian MacPhie (Serbia and Montenegro) Nenad Zimonjić	6–1, 6–7^{(7–9)}, 6–4
Valencia	2004	(Argentina) Gastón Etlis (Argentina) Martín Rodríguez	(Spain) Feliciano López (Spain) Marc López	7–5, 7–6^{(7–5)}
Valencia	2005	(Chile) Fernando González (Argentina) Martín Rodríguez	(Argentina) Lucas Arnold Ker (Argentina) Mariano Hood	6–4, 6–4
Valencia	2006	(Czech Republic) David Škoch (Czech Republic) Tomáš Zíb	(Czech Republic) Lukáš Dlouhý (Czech Republic) Pavel Vízner	6–4, 6–3
Valencia	2007	(South Africa) Wesley Moodie (Australia) Todd Perry	(Switzerland) Yves Allegro (Argentina) Sebastián Prieto	7–5, 7–5
Valencia	2008	(Argentina) Máximo González (Argentina) Juan Mónaco	(United States) Travis Parrott (Slovakia) Filip Polášek	7–5, 7–5
Valencia	2009	(Czech Republic) František Čermák (Slovakia) Michal Mertiňák	(Spain) Marcel Granollers (Spain) Tommy Robredo	6–4, 6–3
Valencia	2010	(United Kingdom) Andy Murray (United Kingdom) Jamie Murray	(India) Mahesh Bhupathi (Belarus) Max Mirnyi	7–6^{(10–8)}, 5–7, [10–7]
Valencia	2011	(United States) Bob Bryan (United States) Mike Bryan	(United States) Eric Butorac (Curaçao) Jean-Julien Rojer	6–4, 7–6^{(11–9)}
Valencia	2012	(Austria) Alexander Peya (Brazil) Bruno Soares	(Spain) David Marrero (Spain) Fernando Verdasco	6–3, 6–2
Valencia	2013	(Austria) Alexander Peya (Brazil) Bruno Soares	(United States) Bob Bryan (United States) Mike Bryan	7–6^{(7–3)}, 6–7^{(1–7)}, [13–11]
Valencia	2014	(Netherlands) Jean-Julien Rojer (Romania) Horia Tecău	(South Africa) Kevin Anderson (France) Jérémy Chardy	6–4, 6–2
Valencia	2015	(United States) Eric Butorac (United States) Scott Lipsky	(Spain) Feliciano López (Belarus) Max Mirnyi	7–6^{(7–4)}, 6–3
