= 2000 Internazionali di Tennis di San Marino – Singles =

Singles
- 2000 Internazionali di Tennis di San Marino

Final
- Champion: (Spain) Álex Calatrava
- Runner-up: (Spain) Sergi Bruguera
- Score: 7–6^{(9–7)}, 1–6, 6–4

Details
- Draw: 32 (3WC/4Q/2SE)
- Seeds: 8

Events
Singles	Doubles
← 1999 ·	San Marino Open

Galo Blanco was the defending champion, but lost in the first round to Julián Alonso.

Álex Calatrava won the title by defeating Sergi Bruguera 7–6^{(9–7)}, 1–6, 6–4 in the final.

== Seeds ==
1. (Argentina) Franco Squillari (first round)
2. (Argentina) Mariano Puerta (first round)
3. (Morocco) Karim Alami (quarterfinals)
4. (Argentina) Gastón Gaudio (first round)
5. (Ukraine) Andrei Medvedev (semifinals, withdrew)
6. (Australia) Richard Fromberg (first round)
7. (Spain) Galo Blanco (first round)
8. (Czech Republic) Jiří Vaněk (quarterfinals)

== Draw ==
=== Key ===
- Q = Qualifier
- WC = Wild card
- LL = Lucky loser
- Alt = Alternate
- SE = Special exempt
- PR = Protected ranking
- ITF = ITF entry
- JE = Junior exempt
- w/o = Walkover
- r = Retired
- d = Defaulted
- SR = Special ranking

=== Finals ===
Semifinals
WC	(Spain) Sergi Bruguera	6^{4}	6	6
WC	(Spain) Diego Nargiso	7^{7}	1	3
5	(Ukraine) Andrei Medvedev
(Spain) Álex Calatrava	w/o

Final
WC	(Spain) Sergi Bruguera	6^{7}	6	4
(Spain) Álex Calatrava	7^{9}	1	6

=== Top half ===
First round
1	(Argentina) F Squillari	1	4
WC	(Spain) S Bruguera	6	6
Q	(France) O Malcor	2	7	1
(Czech Republic) T Zíb	6	5	6
(Italy) A Gaudenzi	6	6
(Czech Republic) M Tabara	3	0
(Spain) J Alonso	2	6	6
7	(Spain) G Blanco	6	1	4
3	(Morocco) K Alami	7	6
(Argentina) G Etlis	5	3
WC	(Italy) R Furlan	4	6	7
SE	(Netherlands) R Sluiter	6	3	5
SE	(Netherlands) E Kempes	4	6	5
(Costa Rica) JA Marín	6	0	7
WC	(Italy) D Nargiso	3	6	6
6	(Australia) R Fromberg	6	2	4

Second round
WC	(Spain) S Bruguera	4	6	6
(Czech Republic) T Zíb	6	3	4
(Italy) A Gaudenzi	6	6^{4}	5
(Spain) J Alonso	4	7^{7}	7
3	(Morocco) K Alami	4	6	6
WC	(Italy) R Furlan	6	1	3
(Costa Rica) JA Marín	5	6	4
WC	(Italy) D Nargiso	7	2	6

Quarterfinals
WC	(Spain) S Bruguera	6	6
(Spain) J Alonso	2	4
3	(Morocco) K Alami	6^{5}	4
WC	(Italy) D Nargiso	7^{7}	6

Semifinals
WC	(Spain) S Bruguera	6^{4}	6	6
WC	(Italy) D Nargiso	7^{7}	1	3

=== Bottom half ===
First round
5	(Ukraine) A Medvedev	6	6
Q	(Italy) S Cobolli	3	4
Q	(Italy) M Charpentier	6	4	4
(Hungary) A Sávolt	0	6	6
(Netherlands) J Siemerink	6	6
(Sweden) F Jonsson	3	2
(Russia) A Stoliarov	6	6
4	(Argentina) G Gaudio	3	0
8	(Czech Republic) J Vaněk	7^{7}	7
Q	(United States) H Armando	6^{3}	5
(Germany) T Behrend	6	6
(Germany) J Knippschild	4	1
(France) S Huet	3	0
(Belgium) C Rochus	6	6
(Spain) Á Calatrava	6^{4}	7^{7}	7
2	(Argentina) M Puerta	7^{7}	6^{4}	5

Second round
5	(Ukraine) A Medvedev	6	7
(Hungary) A Sávolt	1	5
(Netherlands) J Siemerink	6	6
(Russia) A Stoliarov	3	2
8	(Czech Republic) J Vaněk	3	6	6
(Germany) T Behrend	6	4	3
(Belgium) C Rochus	6^{5}	4
(Spain) Á Calatrava	7^{7}	6

Quarterfinals
5	(Ukraine) A Medvedev	6	7
(Netherlands) J Siemerink	4	5
8	(Czech Republic) J Vaněk	5	1
(Spain) Á Calatrava	7	6

Semifinals
5	(Ukraine) A Medvedev
(Spain) Á Calatrava	w/o
