= 2000 Internazionali di Tennis di San Marino – Doubles =

Doubles
- 2000 Internazionali di Tennis di San Marino

Final
- Champions: (Czech Republic) Tomáš Cibulec (Czech Republic) Leoš Friedl
- Runners-up: (Argentina) Gastón Etlis (United States) Jack Waite
- Score: 7–6^{(7–1)}, 7–5

Details
- Draw: 16 (2WC/1Q/1LL)
- Seeds: 1

Events
Singles	Doubles
← 1999 ·	San Marino Open

Lucas Arnold Ker and Mariano Hood were the defending champions, but none competed this year. Arnold Ker chose to compete at Kitzbühel during the same week, reaching the quarterfinals.

Tomáš Cibulec and Leoš Friedl won the title by defeating Gastón Etlis and Jack Waite 7–6^{(7–1)}, 7–5 in the final.

== Seeds ==
1. (Italy) Massimo Bertolini / (Italy) Cristian Brandi (first round)
2. (Argentina) Gastón Etlis / (United States) Jack Waite (final)
3. (Japan) Thomas Shimada / (South Africa) Myles Wakefield (first round)
4. (Italy) Andrea Gaudenzi / (Italy) Diego Nargiso (semifinals)

== Draw ==
=== Key ===
- Q = Qualifier
- WC = Wild card
- LL = Lucky loser
- Alt = Alternate
- SE = Special exempt
- PR = Protected ranking
- ITF = ITF entry
- JE = Junior exempt
- w/o = Walkover
- r = Retired
- d = Defaulted
- SR = Special ranking

=== Draw ===
First round
1	(Italy) M Bertolini (Italy) C Brandi	5	3
(Czech Republic) T Cibulec (Czech Republic) L Friedl	7	6
(Netherlands) S Groen (Netherlands) J Siemerink	6	6
Q	(Italy) M Charpentier (Italy) S Tarallo	3	4
4	(Italy) A Gaudenzi (Italy) D Nargiso	6	6
(Spain) J Alonso (United States) H Armando	4	4
WC	(Argentina) G Gaudio (Argentina) M Puerta	1	6	5
(Germany) M Hilpert (Germany) J Knippschild	6	3	7
(Czech Republic) P Kovačka (Czech Republic) P Kudrnáč	3	6	6
(Australia) P Hanley (Australia) N Healey	6	4	4
WC	(Morocco) K Alami (Ukraine) A Medvedev	6	6
3	(Japan) T Shimada (South Africa) M Wakefield	2	4
LL	(Argentina) E Medica (Czech Republic) T Zíb	1	6^{5}
(Hungary) A Sávolt (Russia) A Stoliarov	6	7^{7}
(Spain) Á Calatrava (Argentina) D del Río	3	4
2	(Argentina) G Etlis (United States) J Waite	6	6

Quarterfinals
(Czech Republic) T Cibulec (Czech Republic) L Friedl	6	6
(Netherlands) S Groen (Netherlands) J Siemerink	4	2
4	(Italy) A Gaudenzi (Italy) D Nargiso	7^{8}	6
(Germany) M Hilpert (Germany) J Knippschild	6^{6}	2
(Czech Republic) P Kovačka (Czech Republic) P Kudrnáč	7	7^{7}
WC	(Morocco) K Alami (Ukraine) A Medvedev	5	6^{4}
(Hungary) A Sávolt (Russia) A Stoliarov	4	6	0
2	(Argentina) G Etlis (United States) J Waite	6	4	6

Semifinals
(Czech Republic) T Cibulec (Czech Republic) L Friedl	7	7^{7}
4	(Italy) A Gaudenzi (Italy) D Nargiso	5	6^{5}
(Czech Republic) P Kovačka (Czech Republic) P Kudrnáč	0	6^{2}
2	(Argentina) G Etlis (United States) J Waite	6	7^{7}

Final
(Czech Republic) T Cibulec (Czech Republic) L Friedl	7^{7}	7
2	(Argentina) G Etlis (United States) J Waite	6^{1}	5
