= 1997 Internazionali di Tennis di San Marino – Singles =

Singles
- 1997 Internazionali di Tennis di San Marino

Final
- Champion: (Spain) Félix Mantilla
- Runner-up: (Sweden) Magnus Gustafsson
- Score: 6–4, 6–1

Details
- Draw: 32 (3WC/4Q)
- Seeds: 8

Events
Singles	Doubles
← 1996 ·	San Marino GO&FUN Open	· 1998 →

Albert Costa was the defending champions, but chose to compete at Cincinnati in the same week.

Félix Mantilla won the title by defeating Magnus Gustafsson 6–4, 6–1 in the final.

== Seeds ==
1. (Spain) Félix Mantilla (champion)
2. (Spain) Alberto Berasategui (second round)
3. (Spain) Albert Portas (first round)
4. (Spain) Javier Sánchez (quarterfinals)
5. (Morocco) Hicham Arazi (first round)
6. (Slovakia) Dominik Hrbatý (semifinals)
7. (Uruguay) Marcelo Filippini (first round)
8. (Norway) Christian Ruud (quarterfinals)

== Draw ==
=== Key ===
- Q = Qualifier
- WC = Wild card
- LL = Lucky loser
- Alt = Alternate
- SE = Special exempt
- PR = Protected ranking
- ITF = ITF entry
- JE = Junior exempt
- w/o = Walkover
- r = Retired
- d = Defaulted
- SR = Special ranking

=== Finals ===
Semifinals
1	(Spain) Félix Mantilla	6	6
6	(Slovakia) Dominik Hrbatý	4	4
(Spain) Carlos Costa	6	1	3
(Sweden) Magnus Gustafsson	1	6	6

Final
1	(Spain) Félix Mantilla	6	6
(Sweden) Magnus Gustafsson	4	1

=== Top half ===
First round
1	(Spain) F Mantilla	6	4	7^{7}
(Australia) R Fromberg	4	6	6^{5}
WC	(Italy) O Camporese	1	5
(Italy) D Sanguinetti	6	7
(Costa Rica) JA Marín	7	6
Q	(Italy) E Grossi	5	1
Q	(Spain) J Dïaz	2	0
8	(Norway) C Ruud	6	6
3	(Spain) A Portas	6	4	0
(Romania) A Voinea	3	6	6
Q	(Ecuador) L Morejón	4	3
(Italy) A Gaudenzi	6	6
(Germany) H Dreekmann	3	6	6
(Ecuador) N Lapentti	6	3	2
(Argentina) M Charpentier	6^{5}	2
6	(Slovakia) D Hrbatý	7^{7}	6

Second round
1	(Spain) F Mantilla	6	4	6
(Italy) D Sanguinetti	4	6	3
(Costa Rica) JA Marín	3	6	2
8	(Norway) C Ruud	6	3	6
(Romania) A Voinea	6	6
(Italy) A Gaudenzi	0	3
(Germany) H Dreekmann	7	5	r
6	(Slovakia) D Hrbatý	5	7

Quarterfinals
1	(Spain) F Mantilla	6	6
8	(Norway) C Ruud	3	1
(Romania) A Voinea	6^{5}	6	5
6	(Slovakia) D Hrbatý	7^{7}	4	7

Semifinals
1	(Spain) F Mantilla	6	6
6	(Slovakia) D Hrbatý	4	4

=== Bottom half ===
First round
5	(Morocco) H Arazi	4	3
(Spain) C Costa	6	6
(Argentina) F Squillari	2	6^{4}
(Italy) R Furlan	6	7^{7}
(Argentina) H Gumy	3	6	7^{7}
(Romania) D Pescariu	6	3	6^{4}
(Italy) M Martelli	3	3
4	(Spain) J Sánchez	6	6
7	(Uruguay) M Filippini	2	4
(Sweden) M Gustafsson	6	6
WC	(Italy) D Scala	4	2
Q	(Spain) A Martín	6	6
(Romania) A Pavel	6	6
(Germany) J Knippschild	3	1
WC	(Italy) D Nargiso	3	4
2	(Spain) A Berasategui	6	6

Second round
(Spain) C Costa	5	6	6
(Italy) R Furlan	7	3	3
(Argentina) H Gumy	3	3
4	(Spain) J Sánchez	6	6
(Sweden) M Gustafsson	7^{7}	6
Q	(Spain) A Martín	6^{3}	2
(Romania) A Pavel	6	6
2	(Spain) A Berasategui	3	4

Quarterfinals
(Spain) C Costa	6	6
4	(Spain) J Sánchez	3	3
(Sweden) M Gustafsson	6	4	6
(Romania) A Pavel	4	6	1

Semifinals
(Spain) C Costa	6	1	3
(Sweden) M Gustafsson	1	6	6
