= 1998 Campionati Internazionali di San Marino – Singles =

Singles
- 1998 Campionati Internazionali di San Marino

Final
- Champion: (Slovakia) Dominik Hrbatý
- Runner-up: (Argentina) Mariano Puerta
- Score: 6–2, 7–5

Details
- Draw: 32
- Seeds: 8

Events
Singles	Doubles
← 1997 ·	Campionati Internazionali di San Marino	· 1999 →

The 1998 Campionati Internazionali di San Marino was a men's tennis tournament played on Clay in City of San Marino, San Marino that was part of the International Series of the 1998 ATP Tour. It was the tenth edition of the tournament and was held from 10 to 16 August 1998.

== Seeds ==
Champion seeds are indicated in bold text while text in italics indicates the round in which those seeds were eliminated.

1. (Italy) Andrea Gaudenzi (quarterfinals)
2. (Australia) Richard Fromberg (semifinals)
3. (Slovakia) **Dominik Hrbatý (champion)**
4. (Sweden) Magnus Norman (first round)
5. (Brazil) Fernando Meligeni (first round)
6. (Spain) Julián Alonso (first round)
7. (Spain) Carlos Costa (semifinals)
8. (Italy) Davide Sanguinetti (second roundturno)

== Draw ==
=== Key ===
- Q = Qualifier
- WC = Wild card
- LL = Lucky loser
- Alt = Alternate
- ITF = ITF entry
- PR = Protected ranking
- SR = Special ranking
- SE = Special exempt
- JE = Junior exempt
- JR = Junior Accelerator Programme entrant
- CO = College Accelerator Programme entrant
- NG = Next Gen Accelerator Program entrant
- w/o = Walkover
- r = Retired
- d = Defaulted

=== Finals ===
Semifinals
7	(Spain) Carlos Costa	0	**6**	**7**
3	**(Slovakia) Dominik Hrbatý**	**6**	4	6
**(Argentina) Mariano Puerta**	**6**	3	**6**
2	(Australia) Richard Fromberg	2	**6**	3

Final
3	**(Slovakia) Dominik Hrbatý**	**6**	**7**
(Argentina) Mariano Puerta	2	5

=== Top half ===
First round
1	**(Italy) A Gaudenzi**	**6**	**7**
(Costa Rica) JA Marín	2	6
**(Spain) J Díaz**	**6**	**6**
(Spain) A Portas	2	2
**(Argentina) M Hood**	**6**	**6**
(Romania) A Pavel	1	2
7	**(Spain) C Costa**	**6**	**6**
(Spain) Á Calatrava	4	2
3	**(Slovakia) D Hrbatý**	**6**	**6**
(Italy) D Scala	4	3
**(Czech Republic) J Novák**	**7**	5	**7**
(Spain) S Bruguera	5	**7**	5
**(Ecuador) L Morejon**	**6**	**6**
(Italy) O Camporese	4	4
**(Spain) JA Viloca**	4	**6**	**7**
**6**	(Spain) J Alonso	**6**	4	6

Second round
1	**(Italy) A Gaudenzi**	**6**	**6**
(Spain) J Díaz	2	2
(Argentina) M Hood	4	5
7	**(Spain) C Costa**	**6**	**7**
3	**(Slovakia) D Hrbatý**	**7**	**7**
(Czech Republic) J Novák	6	6
(Ecuador) L Morejon	3	3
**(Spain) JA Viloca**	**6**	**6**

Quarterfinals
1	(Italy) A Gaudenzi	5	1
7	**(Spain) C Costa**	**7**	**6**
3	**(Slovakia) D Hrbatý**	2	**6**	**6**
(Spain) JA Viloca	**6**	4	0

Semifinals
7	(Spain) C Costa	0	**6**	**7**
3	**(Slovakia) D Hrbatý**	**6**	4	6

=== Bottom half ===
First round
**(Spain) F Vicente**	0	**6**	**6**
5	(Brazil) F Meligeni	**6**	4	2
**(Argentina) M Zabaleta**	**6**	**6**
(Italy) R Furlan	3	3
**(Argentina) M Puerta**	**6**	4	**6**
(Argentina) L Arnold	4	**6**	3
**(Spain) G Blanco**	**6**	**6**
4	(Sweden) M Norman	3	0
8	**(Italy) D Sanguinetti**	**6**	3	**6**
(Italy) M Martelli	1	**6**	4
**(Italy) V Santopadre**	**6**	**6**
(Russia) M Safin	2	0
**(Spain) J Sánchez**	**6**	**6**
(Italy) P Angelini	4	2
2	**(Australia) R Fromberg**	**6**	**6**
(Romania) D Pescariu	4	0

Second round
(Spain) F Vicente	**7**	6	4
**(Argentina) M Zabaleta**	5	**7**	**6**
**(Argentina) M Puerta**	4	**6**	**6**
(Spain) G Blanco	**6**	3	1
8	(Italy) D Sanguinetti	6	2
**(Italy) V Santopadre**	**7**	**6**
(Spain) J Sánchez	2	3
2	**(Australia) R Fromberg**	**6**	**6**

Quarterfinals
(Argentina) M Zabaleta	**6**	3	0^{r}
**(Argentina) M Puerta**	4	**6**	4
(Italy) V Santopadre	4	5
2	**(Australia) R Fromberg**	**6**	**7**

Semifinals
**(Argentina) M Puerta**	**6**	3	**6**
2	(Australia) R Fromberg	2	**6**	3
