= 1997 Internazionali di Tennis di San Marino – Doubles =

Doubles
- 1997 Internazionali di Tennis di San Marino

Final
- Champions: (Italy) Cristian Brandi (Italy) Filippo Messori
- Runners-up: (United States) Brandon Coupe (Mexico) David Roditi
- Score: 7–5, 6–4

Events
Singles	Doubles
← 1996 ·	San Marino GO&FUN Open	· 1998 →

Pablo Albano and Lucas Arnold Ker were the defending champions, but Albano chose to compete at Cincinnati at the same week. Arnold Ker teamed up with Tom Vanhoudt and lost in the first round to Wayne Arthurs and Richard Fromberg.

Cristian Brandi and Filippo Messori won the title by defeating Brandon Coupe and David Roditi 7–5, 6–4 in the final.

== Seeds ==
1. (Netherlands) Menno Oosting / (United States) Greg Van Emburgh (first round)
2. (Argentina) Lucas Arnold Ker / (Belgium) Tom Vanhoudt (first round)
3. (Italy) Cristian Brandi / (Italy) Filippo Messori (champions)
4. (United States) Mark Keil / (Belgium) Libor Pimek (first round)

== Draw ==
=== Key ===
- Q = Qualifier
- WC = Wild card
- LL = Lucky loser
- Alt = Alternate
- SE = Special exempt
- PR = Protected ranking
- ITF = ITF entry
- JE = Junior exempt
- w/o = Walkover
- r = Retired
- d = Defaulted
- SR = Special ranking

=== Draw ===
First round
1	(Netherlands) M Oosting (United States) G Van Emburgh	2	4
(United States) B Coupe (Mexico) D Roditi	6	6
(Italy) A Gaudenzi (Netherlands) S Noteboom	6	6
(Romania) D Pescariu (Italy) D Sanguinetti	2	3
4	(United States) M Keil (Belgium) L Pimek	6	2	2
(Hungary) G Köves (Hungary) L Markovits	2	6	6
(Sweden) D Ekerot (United States) B Hansen-Dent	3	1
(Australia) P Kilderry (Ecuador) N Lapentti	6	6
(Spain) A Martín (Spain) A Portas	4	3
WC	(Uruguay) M Filippini (Argentina) H Gumy	6	6
(Croatia) S Hiršzon (Germany) M Huning	4	6	3
3	(Italy) C Brandi (Italy) F Messori	6	3	6
WC	(Morocco) H Arazi (Romania) A Voinea	7	1	5
WC	(Italy) O Camporese (Italy) D Nargiso	5	6	7
Q	(Australia) W Arthurs (Australia) R Fromberg	4	7	7
2	(Argentina) L Arnold Ker (Belgium) T Vanhoudt	6	5	5

Quarterfinals
(United States) B Coupe (Mexico) D Roditi	6	3	7
(Italy) A Gaudenzi (Netherlands) S Noteboom	4	6	5
(Hungary) G Köves (Hungary) L Markovits	6	1	1
(Australia) P Kilderry (Ecuador) N Lapentti	3	6	6
WC	(Uruguay) M Filippini (Argentina) H Gumy
3	(Italy) C Brandi (Italy) F Messori	w/o
WC	(Italy) O Camporese (Italy) D Nargiso	6	5	7
Q	(Australia) W Arthurs (Australia) R Fromberg	3	7	6

Semifinals
(United States) B Coupe (Mexico) D Roditi	7	6
(Australia) P Kilderry (Ecuador) N Lapentti	6	4
3	(Italy) C Brandi (Italy) F Messori	6	6
WC	(Italy) O Camporese (Italy) D Nargiso	3	4

Final
(United States) B Coupe (Mexico) D Roditi	5	4
3	(Italy) C Brandi (Italy) F Messori	7	6
