= 1996 Campionati Internazionali di San Marino – Singles =

Singles
- 1996 Campionati Internazionali di San Marino
- 1995 Champion: (Austria) Thomas Muster

Final
- Champion: (Spain) Albert Costa
- Runner-up: (Argentina) Félix Mantilla
- Score: 7–6 (9–7), 6–3

Details
- Draw: 32
- Seeds: 8

Events
Singles	Doubles
← 1995 ·	Campionati Internazionali di San Marino	· 1997 →

Thomas Muster was the defending champion but did not compete that year.

Albert Costa won in the final 7–6 (9–7), 6–3 against Félix Mantilla.

== Seeds ==
A champion seed is indicated in bold text while text in italics indicates the round in which that seed was eliminated.

1. (Spain) **Albert Costa (champion)**
2. (Spain) Félix Mantilla (final)
3. (Italy) Andrea Gaudenzi (second round)
4. (Argentina) Hernán Gumy (second round)
5. (Czech Republic) Jiří Novák (first round)
6. (Austria) Gilbert Schaller (quarterfinals)
7. (Morocco) Karim Alami (first round)
8. (Czech Republic) Ctislav Doseděl (quarterfinals)

== Draw ==
=== Key ===
- Q = Qualifier
- WC = Wild card
- LL = Lucky loser
- Alt = Alternate
- SE = Special exempt
- PR = Protected ranking
- ITF = ITF entry
- JE = Junior exempt
- w/o = Walkover
- r = Retired
- d = Defaulted
- SR = Special ranking

First round
1	(Spain) **A Costa**	**6**	**6**
WC	(Italy) D Nargiso	4	2
(Spain) M A Gorriz	**6**	1	4
(Brazil) **G Kuerten**	1	**6**	**6**
(Romania) **A Voinea**	4	**6**	**6**
Q	(Spain) J Díaz	**6**	3	4
WC	(France) **F Santoro**	**6**	**7^{7}**
7	(Morocco) K Alami	3	6^{3}
4	(Argentina) **H Gumy**	**6**	**6**
(Uruguay) M Filippini	1	1
Q	(Argentina) **M Charpentier**	5	**6**	**6**
(Denmark) F Fetterlein	**7**	3	3
Q	(Spain) A Martín	3	0
(Ecuador) **L Morejón**	**6**	**6**
WC	(Italy) F Messori	4	2
6	(Austria) **G Schaller**	**6**	**6**
5	(Czech Republic) J Novák	5	6^{6}
(Czech Republic) **D Rikl**	**7**	**7^{8}**
(Norway) **C Ruud**	**6**	**6**
(Belgium) J van Herck	1	0
(Spain) G Blanco	5	2
(Spain) **J Sánchez**	**7**	**6**
(Belgium) K Goossens	3	**7**	2
3	(Italy) **A Gaudenzi**	**6**	5	**6**
8	(Czech Republic) **C Doseděl**	**7^{9}**	**6**
(Hungary) S Noszály	6^{7}	2
Q	(France) **T Guardiola**	3	**6**	**2**
(Morocco) Y El Aynaoui	**6**	2	0/r
(Portugal) **J Cunha e Silva**	**6**	6^{9}	**6**
(Italy) O Camporese	3	**7^{11}**	4
(Argentina) M Zabaleta	2	5
2	(Spain) **F Mantilla**	**6**	**7**

Second round
1	(Spain) **A Costa**	**6**	**6**
(Brazil) G Kuerten	3	3
(Romania) **A Voinea**	**6**	**6**
WC	(France) F Santoro	1	1
4	(Argentina) H Gumy	3	3
Q	(Argentina) **M Charpentier**	**6**	**6**
(Ecuador) L Morejón	**7^{9}**	6^{1}	5
6	(Austria) **G Schaller**	6^{7}	**7^{7}**	**7**
(Czech Republic) D Rikl	2	2
(Norway) **C Ruud**	**6**	**6**
(Spain) **J Sánchez**	4	**7^{7}**	**6**
3	(Italy) A Gaudenzi	**6**	6^{4}	4
8	(Czech Republic) **C Doseděl**	**7^{7}**	**2**
Q	(France) T Guardiola	6^{1}	0	r
(Portugal) J Cunha e Silva	2	1
2	(Spain) **F Mantilla**	**6**	**6**

Quarterfinals
1	(Spain) **A Costa**	3	**6**	**6**
(Romania) A Voinea	**6**	2	3
Q	(Argentina) **M Charpentier**	**6**	**6**
6	(Austria) G Schaller	4	4
(Norway) C Ruud	1	**7**	4
(Spain) **J Sánchez**	**6**	5	**6**
8	(Czech Republic) C Doseděl	3	**7**	4
2	(Spain) **F Mantilla**	**6**	5	**6**

Semifinals
1	(Spain) **A Costa**	**6**	**7^{7}**
Q	(Argentina) M Charpentier	4	6^{0}
(Spain) J Sánchez	4	5
2	(Spain) **F Mantilla**	**6**	**7**

Final
1	(Spain) **Albert Costa**	**7^{9}**	**6**
2	(Spain) Félix Mantilla	6^{7}	3
