= 2004 Mutua Madrileña Masters Madrid – Singles =

Singles
- 2004 Mutua Madrileña Masters Madrid

Final
- Champion: (Russia) Marat Safin
- Runner-up: (Argentina) David Nalbandian
- Score: 6–2, 6–4, 6–3

Details
- Draw: 48 (3WC/6Q/1SE)
- Seeds: 16

Events
| Singles | Doubles |
| ← 2003 · | Madrid Open | · 2005 → |

Marat Safin defeated David Nalbandian in the final, 6–2, 6–4, 6–3 to win the singles tennis title at the 2004 Madrid Open.

Juan Carlos Ferrero was the defending champion, but lost to Luis Horna in the second round.

== Seeds ==
A champion seed is indicated in bold text while text in italics indicates the round in which that seed was eliminated. All sixteen seeds received a bye into the second round.

1. (United Kingdom) Tim Henman (third round)
2. (United States) Andre Agassi (semifinals)
3. (Russia) **Marat Safin (champion)**
4. (Argentina) David Nalbandian (final)
5. (Chile) Nicolás Massú (second round)
6. (Spain) Juan Carlos Ferrero (second round)
7. (Sweden) Joachim Johansson (quarterfinals)
8. (Spain) Tommy Robredo (quarterfinals)
9. (Romania) Andrei Pavel (third round)
10. (Slovakia) Dominik Hrbatý (second round)
11. (Czech Republic) Jiří Novák (second round)
12. (Argentina) Juan Ignacio Chela (second round)
13. (Germany) Rainer Schüttler (second round)
14. (United States) Vincent Spadea (third round)
15. (Chile) Fernando González (second round)
16. (Thailand) Paradorn Srichaphan (third round)

== Draw ==
=== Key ===
- Q = Qualifier
- WC = Wild card
- LL = Lucky loser
- Alt = Alternate
- SE = Special exempt
- PR = Protected ranking
- ITF = ITF entry
- JE = Junior exempt
- w/o = Walkover
- r = Retired
- d = Defaulted
- SR = Special ranking

=== Finals ===
Quarterfinals
**(Croatia) Ivan Ljubičić** | **7^{7}** | 6^{1} | **7^{7}**
7 | (Sweden) Joachim Johansson | 6^{2} | **7^{7}** | 6^{3}
4 | **(Argentina) David Nalbandian** | **7^{7}** | **6**
(United States) Taylor Dent | 6^{4} | 3
(Peru) Luis Horna | 4 | 4
3 | **(Russia) Marat Safin** | **6** | **6**
8 | (Spain) Tommy Robredo | **7^{7}** | 3 | 2
2 | **(United States) Andre Agassi** | 6^{3} | **6** | **6**

Semifinals
(Croatia) Ivan Ljubičić | 4 | 4
4 | (Argentina) **David Nalbandian** | **6** | **6**
3 | (Russia) **Marat Safin** | **6** | **7^{7}**
2 | (United States) Andre Agassi | 3 | 6^{4}

Final
4 | (Argentina) David Nalbandian | 2 | 4 | 3
3 | (Russia) **Marat Safin** | **6** | **6** | **6**

=== Top half ===
==== Section 1 ====
First round
(Georgia (country)) I Labadze | 2 | **7** | 5
(Spain) **A Costa** | **6** | 5 | **7**
Q | (Czech Republic) T Berdych | 4 | 4
(Croatia) **I Ljubičić** | **6** | **6**
Q | (France) **A Dupuis** | **6** | **6**
(Argentina) A Calleri | 4 | 4
Q | (Belgium) K Vliegen | **7** | 5 | 1
(Argentina) **G Cañas** | 5 | **7** | **6**

Second round
1 | (United Kingdom) **T Henman** | **6** | **6**
(Spain) A Costa | 4 | 2
(Croatia) **I Ljubičić** | **6** | **6**
13 | (Germany) R Schüttler | 3 | 0
12 | (Argentina) J I Chela | 6^{4} | 3
Q | (France) **A Dupuis** | **7^{7}** | **6**
(Argentina) G Cañas | 6^{3} | 5
7 | (Sweden) **J Johansson** | **7^{7}** | **7**

Third round
1 | (United Kingdom) T Henman | 4 | **6** | 2
(Croatia) **I Ljubičić** | **6** | 4 | **6**
Q | (France) A Dupuis | 1 | 6^{6}
7 | (Sweden) **J Johansson** | **6** | **7^{8}**

Quarterfinals
(Croatia) **I Ljubičić** | **7^{7}** | 6^{1} | **7^{7}**
7 | (Sweden) J Johansson | 6^{2} | **7^{7}** | 6^{3}

==== Section 2 ====
First round
(Sweden) **R Söderling** | **6** | **7^{7}**
(Germany) F Mayer | 3 | 6^{2}
WC | (Spain) **À Corretja** | **7** | **6**
WC | (Spain) D Ferrer | 5 | 1
(Germany) **T Haas** | **6** | **6**
(Belgium) X Malisse | 4 | 1
(United States) **T Dent** | **6** | **6**
(Russia) M Youzhny | 3 | 2

Second round
4 | (Argentina) **D Nalbandian** | **7^{7}** | **6**
(Sweden) R Söderling | 6^{5} | 3
WC | (Spain) À Corretja | 6^{5} | 3
16 | (Thailand) **P Srichaphan** | **7^{7}** | **6**
11 | (Czech Republic) J Novák | 1 | 4
(Germany) **T Haas** | **6** | **6**
(United States) **T Dent** | **6** | 3 | **6**
5 | (Chile) N Massú | 3 | **6** | 3

Third round
4 | (Argentina) **D Nalbandian** | **6** | **6**
16 | (Thailand) P Srichaphan | 3 | 1
(Germany) T Haas | 6^{3} | 2
(United States) **T Dent** | **7^{7}** | **6**

Quarterfinals
4 | (Argentina) **D Nalbandian** | **7^{7}** | **6**
(United States) T Dent | 6^{4} | 3

=== Bottom half ===
==== Section 3 ====
First round
(Peru) **L Horna** | **6** | **7**
(Morocco) H Arazi | 4 | 5
(Croatia) M Ančić | **6** | 4 | 4
(United States) **M Fish** | 0 | **6** | **6**
Q | (Austria) **S Koubek** | **6** | **6**
(Netherlands) S Schalken | 4 | 4
(Croatia) I Karlović | 4 | **7^{12}** | 6^{5}
(Spain) **F López** | **6** | 6^{10} | **7^{7}**

Second round
6 | (Spain) J C Ferrero | 3 | 1
(Peru) **L Horna** | **6** | **6**
(United States) M Fish | 1 | **6** | 6^{2}
9 | (Romania) **A Pavel** | **6** | 3 | **7^{7}**
15 | (Chile) F González | 1 | **6** | 6^{5}
Q | (Austria) **S Koubek** | **6** | 3 | **7^{7}**
(Spain) F López | 5 | **7^{7}** | 3
3 | (Russia) **M Safin** | **7** | 6^{5} | **6**

Third round
(Peru) **L Horna** | **7** | **6**
9 | (Romania) A Pavel | 5 | 4
Q | (Austria) S Koubek | 3 | 3
3 | (Russia) **M Safin** | **6** | **6**

Quarterfinals
(Peru) L Horna | 4 | 4
3 | (Russia) **M Safin** | **6** | **6**

==== Section 4 ====
First round
Q | (Spain) J L T Rascon | 1 | 4
(United States) **R Ginepri** | **6** | **6**
(Sweden) J Björkman | 1 | 2
(Spain) **F Verdasco** | **6** | **6**
(Spain) **R Nadal** | **6** | **6**
SE | (Italy) D Sanguinetti | 2 | 1
WC | (Spain) D Sánchez | 3 | 6^{3}
Q | (Belarus) **M Mirnyi** | **6** | **7^{7}**

Second round
8 | (Spain) **T Robredo** | **6** | 3 | **6**
(United States) R Ginepri | 4 | **6** | 3
(Spain) **F Verdasco** | **6** | **7^{7}**
10 | (Slovakia) D Hrbatý | 4 | 6^{4}
14 | (United States) **V Spadea** | **6** | 4 | **6**
(Spain) R Nadal | 4 | **6** | 3
Q | (Belarus) M Mirnyi | 6^{5} | 3
2 | (United States) **A Agassi** | **7^{7}** | **6**

Third round
8 | (Spain) **T Robredo** | 2 | **6** | **6**
(Spain) F Verdasco | **6** | 4 | 3
14 | (United States) V Spadea | 1 | 3
2 | (United States) **A Agassi** | **6** | **6**

Quarterfinals
8 | (Spain) T Robredo | **7^{7}** | 3 | 2
2 | (United States) **A Agassi** | 6^{3} | **6** | **6**

== Qualifying ==
=== Qualifying seeds ===
1. (Czech Republic) **Tomáš Berdych (qualified)**
2. (Italy) Filippo Volandri (qualifying competition)
3. (Sweden) Thomas Johansson (qualifying competition)
4. (Argentina) Mariano Zabaleta (first round)
5. (Sweden) Thomas Enqvist (qualifying competition)
6. (Brazil) Ricardo Mello (first round)
7. (Spain) Alberto Martín (qualifying competition)
8. (Argentina) José Acasuso (first round)
9. (Belgium) Olivier Rochus (qualifying competition)
10. (Luxembourg) Gilles Müller (first round)
11. (Belarus) **Max Mirnyi (qualified)**
12. (United States) Jan-Michael Gambill (first round)

=== Qualified ===
1. (Czech Republic) **Tomáš Berdych**
2. (Spain) **Tati Rascón**
3. (Austria) **Stefan Koubek**
4. (Belgium) **Kristof Vliegen**
5. (Belarus) **Max Mirnyi**
6. (France) **Antony Dupuis**

=== Special exempt ===
1. (Italy) **Davide Sanguinetti** (reached the semifinals at Vienna)

=== Qualifying draw ===
==== First qualifier ====
First round
1 | **(Czech Republic) Tomáš Berdych** | 4 | **6** | **6**
(Finland) Jarkko Nieminen | **6** | 3 | 3
WC | (Italy) Andreas Seppi | 3 | 5
9 | **(Belgium) Olivier Rochus** | **6** | **7**

Qualifying competition
1 | **(Czech Republic) Tomáš Berdych** | **7** | **7^{7}**
9 | (Belgium) Olivier Rochus | 5 | 6^{5}

==== Second qualifier ====
First round
2 | **(Italy) Filippo Volandri** | **6** | **6**
WC | (Spain) Quino Muñoz | 3 | 1
WC | **(Spain) Tati Rascón** | **6** | 6^{3} | **6**
8 | (Argentina) José Acasuso | 3 | **7^{7}** | 3

Qualifying competition
2 | (Italy) Filippo Volandri | **7^{7}** | 3 | 4
WC | **(Spain) Tati Rascón** | 6^{4} | **6** | **6**

==== Third qualifier ====
First round
3 | **(Sweden) Thomas Johansson** | 6^{6} | **6** | **6**
Alt | (Spain) Nicolás Almagro | **7^{8}** | 1 | 3
**(Austria) Stefan Koubek** | 1 | **6** | **6**
12 | (United States) Jan-Michael Gambill | **6** | 4 | 1

Qualifying competition
3 | (Sweden) Thomas Johansson | 4 | 4
**(Austria) Stefan Koubek** | **6** | **6**

==== Fourth qualifier ====
First round
4 | (Argentina) Mariano Zabaleta | 3 | **7^{7}** | 4
**(Belgium) Kristof Vliegen** | **6** | 6^{2} | **6**
(Spain) Álex Calatrava | **6** | 4 | 3
7 | **(Spain) Alberto Martín** | 2 | **6** | **6**

Qualifying competition
**(Belgium) Kristof Vliegen** | **6** | **6**
7 | (Spain) Alberto Martín | 2 | 4

==== Fifth qualifier ====
First round
5 | **(Sweden) Thomas Enqvist** | **6** | 2 | **6**
(Italy) Potito Starace | 3 | **6** | 4
(France) Grégory Carraz | 3 | 1
11 | **(Belarus) Max Mirnyi** | **6** | **6**

Qualifying competition
5 | (Sweden) Thomas Enqvist | 5 | 6^{2}
11 | **(Belarus) Max Mirnyi** | **7** | **7^{7}**

==== Sixth qualifier ====
First round
6 | (Brazil) Ricardo Mello | **7^{7}** | 2 | 2
Alt | **(France) Antony Dupuis** | 6^{3} | **6** | **6**
WC | **(Spain) Guillermo García López** | 5 | **6** | **7^{7}**
10 | (Luxembourg) Gilles Müller | **7** | 3 | 6^{4}

Qualifying competition
Alt | **(France) Antony Dupuis** | **6** | **6**
WC | (Spain) Guillermo García López | 4 | 4
