= 2000 Internazionali di Tennis di San Marino =

- Date: 24–30 July
- Edition: 12th
- Category: International Series
- Draw: 32S / 16D
- Prize money: $325,000
- Surface: Clay / outdoor
- Location: City of San Marino, San Marino

Champions

Singles
- (Spain) Álex Calatrava

Doubles
- (Czech Republic) Tomáš Cibulec / (Czech Republic) Leoš Friedl
← 1999 ·	Campionati Internazionali di San Marino	· 2001 →

The 2000 Internazionali di Tennis di San Marino was a men's tennis tournament played on outdoor clay courts in City of San Marino, San Marino that was part of the International Series of the 2000 ATP Tour. It was the 12th edition of the tournament and was held from 24 July until 30 July 2000. Unseeded Álex Calatrava won the singles titles.

== Finals ==
=== Singles ===
(Spain) Álex Calatrava defeated (Spain) Sergi Bruguera, 7–6^{(9–7)}, 1–6, 6–4

- It was Calatrava's only singles title of his career.

=== Doubles ===
(Czech Republic) Tomáš Cibulec / (Czech Republic) Leoš Friedl defeated (Argentina) Gastón Etlis / (United States) Jack Waite, 7–6^{(7–1)}, 7–5

- It was Cibulec's only doubles title of the year and the 1st of his career. It was Friedl's only doubles title of the year and the 1st of his career.
