= 1999 Internazionali di Tennis di San Marino – Singles =

Singles
- 1999 Internazionali di Tennis di San Marino

Final
- Champion: (Spain) Galo Blanco
- Runner-up: (Spain) Albert Portas
- Score: 4–6, 6–4, 6–3

Details
- Draw: 32 (3WC/4Q)
- Seeds: 8

Events
Singles	Doubles
← 1998 ·	San Marino GO&FUN Open

Dominik Hrbatý was the defending champion, but was forced to withdraw in his first round match against Marcelo Filippini due to a muscle strain.

Galo Blanco won the title by defeating Albert Portas 4–6, 6–4, 6–3 in the final.

== Seeds ==
1. (Slovakia) Dominik Hrbatý (first round, retired)
2. (Argentina) Mariano Zabaleta (first round)
3. (Brazil) Fernando Meligeni (first round)
4. (Morocco) Younes El Aynaoui (second round, retired)
5. (Spain) Fernando Vicente (first round)
6. (Morocco) Hicham Arazi (first round)
7. (Austria) Stefan Koubek (quarterfinals)
8. (Argentina) Franco Squillari (second round)

== Draw ==
=== Key ===
- Q = Qualifier
- WC = Wild card
- LL = Lucky loser
- Alt = Alternate
- SE = Special exempt
- PR = Protected ranking
- ITF = ITF entry
- JE = Junior exempt
- w/o = Walkover
- r = Retired
- d = Defaulted
- SR = Special ranking

=== Finals ===
Semifinals
(Spain) Albert Portas	6	6
(Costa Rica) Juan Antonio Marín	2	4
(Spain) Galo Blanco	6	6
(Italy) Andrea Gaudenzi	2	2

Final
(Spain) Albert Portas	6	4	3
(Spain) Galo Blanco	4	6	6

=== Top half ===
First round
1	(Slovakia) D Hrbatý	6^{5}	1^{r}
(Uruguay) M Filippini	7^{7}	1
(Spain) A Portas	6	0	6
Q	(Italy) I Gaudi	3	6	1
(Romania) A Voinea	4	6	6
(Argentina) G Cañas	6	3	4
WC	(Italy) V Santopadre	4	1
7	(Austria) S Koubek	6	6
4	(Morocco) Y El Aynaoui	3	6	6
(Argentina) M Puerta	6	3	2
Q	(Croatia) L Zovko	6	2	4
(Costa Rica) JA Marín	3	6	6
Q	(Spain) Á Calatrava	4	1
(Argentina) H Gumy	6	6
(Argentina) G Gaudio	6	6
5	(Spain) F Vicente	2	2

Second round
(Uruguay) M Filippini	5	6^{5}
(Spain) A Portas	7	7^{7}
(Romania) A Voinea	3	3
7	(Austria) S Koubek	6	6
4	(Morocco) Y El Aynaoui	6^{8}	6	0^{r}
(Costa Rica) JA Marín	7^{10}	4	4
(Argentina) H Gumy	6	4	6
(Argentina) G Gaudio	3	6	3

Quarterfinals
(Spain) A Portas	6	6
7	(Austria) S Koubek	4	2
(Costa Rica) JA Marín	4	6	6
(Argentina) H Gumy	6	3	2

Semifinals
(Spain) A Portas	6	6
(Costa Rica) JA Marín	2	4

=== Bottom half ===
First round
6	(Morocco) H Arazi	5	0
(Morocco) K Alami	7	6
(Spain) G Blanco	7	6
(Argentina) M Rodríguez	5	4
WC	(Italy) D Nargiso	7	6
Q	(Argentina) JI Chela	5	2
(Austria) M Hipfl	4	6	6
3	(Brazil) F Meligeni	6	4	0
8	(Argentina) F Squillari	7^{7}	6
(Sweden) M Gustafsson	6^{2}	4
(Italy) D Sanguinetti	5	4
WC	(Spain) J Alonso	7	6
(Germany) O Gross	4	4
(Italy) A Gaudenzi	6	6
(Armenia) S Sargsian	6	6
2	(Argentina) M Zabaleta	3	2

Second round
(Morocco) K Alami	4	2
(Spain) G Blanco	6	6
WC	(Italy) D Nargiso	5	3
(Austria) M Hipfl	7	6
8	(Argentina) F Squillari	2	6	6^{2}
WC	(Spain) J Alonso	6	2	7^{7}
(Italy) A Gaudenzi	6	6
(Armenia) S Sargsian	4	2

Quarterfinals
(Spain) G Blanco	7^{9}	7^{7}
(Austria) M Hipfl	6^{7}	6^{2}
WC	(Spain) J Alonso	1	3
(Italy) A Gaudenzi	6	6

Semifinals
(Spain) G Blanco	6	6
(Italy) A Gaudenzi	2	2
