= 1999 Internazionali di Tennis di San Marino =

- Date: 9–15 August
- Edition: 11th
- Category: World Series
- Draw: 32S / 16D
- Prize money: $275,000
- Surface: Clay / outdoor
- Location: City of San Marino, San Marino

Champions

Singles
- (Spain) Galo Blanco

Doubles
- (Argentina) Lucas Arnold Ker / (Argentina) Mariano Hood
← 1998 ·	Campionati Internazionali di San Marino	· 2000 →

The 1999 Internazionali di Tennis di San Marino was a men's tennis tournament played on outdoor clay courts in City of San Marino, San Marino that was part of the World Series of the 1999 ATP Tour. It was the 11th edition of the tournament and was held from 9 August until 15 August 1999. Unseeded Galo Blanco won the singles titles.

== Finals ==
=== Singles ===
(Spain) Galo Blanco defeated (Spain) Albert Portas, 4–6, 6–4, 6–3

- It was Blanco's only singles title of his career.

=== Doubles ===
(Argentina) Lucas Arnold Ker / (Argentina) Mariano Hood defeated (Czech Republic) Petr Pála / (Czech Republic) Pavel Vízner, 6–3, 6–2
