= 1996 Campionati Internazionali di San Marino =

- Date: 5–11 August
- Edition: 8th
- Category: World Series
- Draw: 32S / 16D
- Prize money: $275,000
- Surface: Clay / outdoor
- Location: City of San Marino, San Marino

Champions

Singles
- (Spain) Albert Costa

Doubles
- (Argentina) Pablo Albano / (Argentina) Lucas Arnold
← 1995 ·	Campionati Internazionali di San Marino	· 1997 →

The 1996 Campionati Internazionali di San Marino was a men's tennis tournament played on outdoor clay courts at the Centro Tennis Cassa di Risparmio di Fonte dell'Ovo in the City of San Marino in San Marino and was part of the World Series of the 1996 ATP Tour. The tournament was held from 5 August until 11 August 1996. First-seeded Albert Costa won the singles title.

== Finals ==
=== Singles ===
(Spain) Albert Costa defeated (Spain) Félix Mantilla 7–6^{(9–7)}, 6–3

- It was Costa's 2nd singles title of the year and the 3rd of his career.

=== Doubles ===
(Argentina) Pablo Albano / (Argentina) Lucas Arnold defeated (Argentina) Mariano Hood / (Argentina) Sebastián Prieto 6–1, 6–3

- It was Albano's 1st title of the year and the 3rd of his career. It was Arnold's only title of the year and the 1st of his career.
