= 1997 Internazionali di Tennis di San Marino =

- Date: 4–10 August
- Edition: 9th
- Category: World Series
- Draw: 32S / 16D
- Prize money: $275,000
- Surface: Clay / outdoor
- Location: City of San Marino, San Marino

Champions

Singles
- (Spain) Félix Mantilla

Doubles
- (Italy) Cristian Brandi / (Italy) Filippo Messori
← 1996 ·	Campionati Internazionali di San Marino	· 1998 →

The 1997 Internazionali di Tennis di San Marino was a men's tennis tournament played on outdoor clay courts in City of San Marino, San Marino that was part of the World Series of the 1997 ATP Tour. It was the ninth edition of the tournament and was held from 4 August until 10 August 1997. First-seeded Félix Mantilla won the singles titles.

== Finals ==
=== Singles ===
(Spain) Félix Mantilla defeated (Sweden) Magnus Gustafsson, 6–4, 6–1

- It was Mantilla's 4th singles title of the year and the 5th of his career..

=== Doubles ===
(Italy) Cristian Brandi / (Italy) Filippo Messori defeated (United States) Brandon Coupe / (Mexico) David Roditi, 7–5, 6–4
