= Pietro Angelini =

Italian tennis player

- Country (sports): Italy
- Born: 7 December 1971 (age 53)
- Prize money: $21,971

Singles
- Career record: 0–1
- Highest ranking: No. 253 (29 Nov 1993)

Grand Slam singles results
- French Open: Q1 (1993)

Doubles
- Highest ranking: No. 407 (11 Nov 1996)

Pietro Angelini (born 7 December 1971 in L'Aquila) is an Italian former professional tennis player.

Active in the 1990s, Angelini is a native of L'Aquila and reached a best world ranking of 253, competing mostly in satellite and Challenger tournaments. He featured in the qualifying draw for the 1993 French Open and made an ATP Tour main draw appearance at the 1998 Campionati Internazionali di San Marino, losing at the first stage in both.

== ITF Futures titles ==
=== Singles: (1) ===
No.	Date	Tournament	Surface	Opponent	Score
1.	Apr 1999	Italy F3, Rome	Clay	(Italy) Gianluca Gatto	6–7, 7–6, 6–4
