= Tati Rascón =

Spanish tennis player (born 1971)

- Country (sports): Spain
- Residence: Madrid, Spain
- Born: 2 March 1971 (age 55) Madrid, Spain
- Height: 1.91 m (6 ft 3 in)
- Turned pro: 1991
- Plays: Right-handed
- Prize money: $190,867

Singles
- Career record: 2–10
- Career titles: 0; 1 Challenger, 9 Futures
- Highest ranking: 144 (20 May 1996)

Grand Slam singles results
- Australian Open: Q1 (2003)
- French Open: Q2 (1998)
- Wimbledon: Q1 (1992, 1993, 1997, 2003)
- US Open: Q3 (1996)

Doubles
- Career record: 0–1
- Career titles: 0; 0 Challenger, 0 Futures
- Highest ranking: 252 (24 June 1996)
- Last updated on: 6 February 2022.

Juan Luis "Tati" Rascón Lope (born 2 March 1971) is a Spanish former professional tennis player.

== ATP Challenger and ITF Futures finals ==
=== Singles: 11 (10–1) ===
Legend ATP Challenger (1–1) ITF Futures (9–0)	Finals by surface Hard (10–0) Clay (0–1) Grass (0–0) Carpet (0–0)

Result	W–L	Date	Tournament	Tier	Surface	Opponent	Score
Loss	0-1	Jul 1995	Seville, Spain	Challenger	Clay	(Germany) Dirk Dier	5–7, 2–6
Win	1-1	Oct 1995	Charleroi, Belgium	Challenger	Hard	(United Kingdom) Chris Wilkinson	6–7, 6–3, 7–6
Win	2-1	Oct 2001	Spain F13, Martos	Futures	Hard	(Spain) Pedro Canovas-Garcia	6–2, 6–2
Win	3-1	Oct 2001	Spain F14, El Ejido	Futures	Hard	(Spain) Pedro Canovas-Garcia	4–6, 6–4, 6–1
Win	4-1	Jun 2002	Spain F3, Canarias	Futures	Hard	(Spain) Fernando Verdasco	6–4, 6–2
Win	5-1	Sep 2002	Spain F14, Madrid	Futures	Hard	(Spain) Miguel-Angel Lopez Jaen	6–4, 6–2
Win	6-1	Oct 2002	Spain F17, Martos	Futures	Hard	(Romania) Adrian Cruciat	6–4, 6–4
Win	7-1	Sep 2003	Spain F22, Madrid	Futures	Hard	(Spain) Esteban Carril-Caso	7–6^{(7–5)}, 6–2
Win	8-1	Sep 2004	Spain F22, Madrid	Futures	Hard	(Germany) Eric Scherer	3–6, 6–1, 6–4
Win	9-1	Sep 2004	Spain F23, Madrid	Futures	Hard	(Germany) Denis Gremelmayr	7–5, 7–6^{(7–2)}
Win	10-1	Sep 2007	Spain F34, Móstoles	Futures	Hard	(Mexico) Bruno Rodriguez	3–6, 6–3, 7–6^{(7–1)}

=== Doubles: 1 (0–1) ===
Legend ATP Challenger (0–1) ITF Futures (0–0)	Finals by surface Hard (0–1) Clay (0–0) Grass (0–0) Carpet (0–0)

Result	W–L	Date	Tournament	Tier	Surface	Partner	Opponents	Score
Loss	0–1	Oct 1995	Glendale, United States	Challenger	Hard	(Sweden) Federico Rovai	(Sweden) Rikard Bergh (Sweden) David Ekerot	2–6, 1–6

== Performance timeline ==
Key
W	F	SF	QF	#R	RR	Q#	DNQ	A	NH

(W) winner; (F) finalist; (SF) semifinalist; (QF) quarterfinalist; (#R) rounds 4, 3, 2, 1; (RR) round-robin stage; (Q#) qualification round; (DNQ) did not qualify; (A) absent; (NH) not held; (SR) strike rate (events won / competed); (W–L) win–loss record.

=== Singles ===
Tournament	1992	1993	1994	1995	1996	1997	1998	1999	2000	2001	2002	2003	2004	2005	2006	SR	W–L	Win %
Grand Slam tournaments
Australian Open	A	A	A	A	A	A	A	A	A	A	A	Q1	A	A	A	0 / 0	0–0	–
French Open	A	Q1	A	A	Q1	A	Q2	A	A	A	A	A	A	A	A	0 / 0	0–0	–
Wimbledon	Q1	Q1	A	A	A	Q1	A	A	A	A	A	Q1	A	A	A	0 / 0	0–0	–
US Open	A	A	A	A	Q3	A	A	A	A	A	A	A	A	A	A	0 / 0	0–0	–
Win–loss	0–0	0–0	0–0	0–0	0–0	0–0	0–0	0–0	0–0	0–0	0–0	0–0	0–0	0–0	0–0	0 / 0	0–0	–
ATP Masters Series
Indian Wells	A	A	A	A	Q1	A	A	A	A	A	A	A	A	A	A	0 / 0	0–0	–
Miami	A	Q1	A	A	2R	A	A	A	A	A	A	A	A	A	A	0 / 1	1–1	50%
Monte Carlo	A	Q1	A	A	A	A	A	A	A	A	A	A	A	A	A	0 / 0	0–0	–
Rome	A	A	Q2	A	A	A	A	A	A	A	A	A	A	A	A	0 / 0	0–0	–
Hamburg	A	A	Q2	A	A	A	A	A	A	A	A	A	A	A	A	0 / 0	0–0	–
Madrid	Not Held										A	Q2	1R	Q1	Q2	0 / 1	0–1	0%
Paris	A	A	Q1	A	A	A	A	A	A	A	A	A	A	A	A	0 / 0	0–0	–
Win–loss	0–0	0–0	0–0	0–0	1–1	0–0	0–0	0–0	0–0	0–0	0–0	0–0	0–1	0–0	0–0	0 / 2	1–2	33%
