= 1996 Lipton Championships – Men's singles =

Men's singles
- 1996 Lipton Championships

Final
- Champion: (United States) Andre Agassi
- Runner-up: (Croatia) Goran Ivanišević
- Score: 3–0, ret.

Details
- Draw: 96 (12Q / 3WC)
- Seeds: 32

Events
Singles	men	women
Doubles	men	women
- Miami Open

Defending champion Andre Agassi won the men's singles tennis title at the 1996 Miami Open, after Goran Ivanišević was forced to retire from the final with the score at 3–0 to Agassi in the first set. The start of the final had already been delayed for 45 minutes while Ivanišević received treatment. Ivanišević had slept awkwardly the night before the final and had woken up that morning with a very stiff neck.

== Seeds ==
All thirty-two seeds received a bye to the second round.

1. (Austria) Thomas Muster (second round)
2. (United States) Pete Sampras (semifinals)
3. (United States) Andre Agassi (champion)
4. (United States) Michael Chang (quarterfinals)
5. (Germany) ~~Boris Becker~~ (withdrew)
6. (Croatia) Goran Ivanišević (final, retired)
7. (United States) Jim Courier (quarterfinals)
8. (Sweden) Thomas Enqvist (second round)
9. (South Africa) Wayne Ferreira (second round)
10. (Spain) Sergi Bruguera (third round)
11. (Switzerland) Marc Rosset (fourth round)
12. (Ukraine) Andriy Medvedev (fourth round)
13. (Chile) Marcelo Ríos (third round)
14. (Spain) Albert Costa (third round)
15. (France) Arnaud Boetsch (semifinals)
16. (United States) Todd Martin (fourth round)
17. (United States) MaliVai Washington (third round)
18. (Italy) Renzo Furlan (third round)
19. (Australia) Mark Woodforde (second round)
20. (Netherlands) Jan Siemerink (second round)
21. (France) Cédric Pioline (third round)
22. (Australia) Todd Woodbridge (third round)
23. (Netherlands) Richard Krajicek (fourth round)
24. (Netherlands) Paul Haarhuis (fourth round)
25. (Australia) Mark Philippoussis (second round)
26. (Zimbabwe) Byron Black (third round)
27. (Sweden) Magnus Larsson (second round)
28. (France) Guy Forget (second round)
29. (Sweden) Jonas Björkman (third round)
30. (Italy) Andrea Gaudenzi (second round)
31. (Argentina) Javier Frana (second round)
32. (Switzerland) Jakob Hlasek (third round)

== Draw ==
Key

- Q = Qualifier
- WC = Wild card
- LL = Lucky loser
- Alt = Alternate
- ITF = ITF entry
- PR = Protected ranking
- SR = Special ranking
- SE = Special exempt
- JE = Junior exempt
- JR = Junior Accelerator Programme entrant
- CO = College Accelerator Programme entrant
- NG = Next Gen Accelerator Program entrant
- w/o = Walkover
- r = Retired
- d = Defaulted

=== Finals ===
Quarterfinals
15	(France) Arnaud Boetsch	7^{7}	3	7
7	(United States) Jim Courier	6^{3}	6	5
3	(United States) Andre Agassi	6	6
(United States) Michael Joyce	4	1
6	(Croatia) Goran Ivanišević	6	6
4	(United States) Michael Chang	4	4
(United States) Vince Spadea	3	4
2	(United States) Pete Sampras	6	6

Semifinals
15	(France) Arnaud Boetsch	4	3
3	(United States) Andre Agassi	6	6
6	(Croatia) Goran Ivanišević	2	6	6
2	(United States) Pete Sampras	6	4	4

Final
3	(United States) Andre Agassi	3
6	(Croatia) Goran Ivanišević	0^{r}

=== Top half ===
==== Section 1 ====
First round
(United States) D Rostagno	6^{10}	5
(Venezuela) N Pereira	7^{12}	7
(Sweden) S Edberg	6^{6}	6	6
(Spain) E Sánchez	7^{8}	3	2
(Poland) W Kowalski	6	3	7
WC	(United States) A Krickstein	3	6	5
(Italy) G Pozzi	1	2
Q	(Canada) D Nestor	6	6

Second round
1	(Austria) T Muster	6^{4}	4
(Venezuela) N Pereira	7^{7}	6
(Sweden) S Edberg	7^{7}	7^{7}
31	(Argentina) J Frana	6^{5}	6^{5}
17	(United States) M Washington	6	2	6
(Poland) W Kowalski	3	6	4
Q	(Canada) D Nestor	5	3
15	(France) A Boetsch	7	6

Third round
(Venezuela) N Pereira	4	2
(Sweden) S Edberg	6	6
17	(United States) M Washington	3	4
15	(France) A Boetsch	6	6

Fourth round
(Sweden) S Edberg	6	4	2
15	(France) A Boetsch	3	6	6

==== Section 2 ====
First round
(Germany) H Dreekmann	7^{7}	6
Q	(Italy) D Musa	6^{3}	4
(United States) P McEnroe	6	6^{3}	0
(Australia) M Tebbutt	2	7^{7}	6
Q	(Brazil) R Jabali	7^{7}	6
Q	(United States) D DiLucia	6^{5}	4
Q	(United States) B Shelton	5	7	4
Q	(United States) S Bryan	7	5	6

Second round
9	(South Africa) W Ferreira	6^{4}	6	4
(Germany) H Dreekmann	7^{7}	3	6
(Australia) M Tebbutt	6	7^{7}
24	(Netherlands) P Haarhuis	1	6^{3}
26	(Zimbabwe) B Black	6	6
Q	(Brazil) R Jabali	3	1
Q	(United States) S Bryan	1	0
7	(United States) J Courier	6	6

Third round
(Germany) H Dreekmann	2	3
(Australia) M Tebbutt	6	6
26	(Zimbabwe) B Black	6^{1}	0
7	(United States) J Courier	7^{7}	6

Fourth round
(Australia) M Tebbutt	6	4	5
7	(United States) J Courier	3	6	7

==== Section 3 ====
First round
(Germany) B Karbacher	6	6
(United States) C Woodruff	2	3
(France) J-P Fleurian	6	6
Q	(South Africa) R Koenig	4	3
(Canada) S Lareau	3	6	6
(Argentina) H Gumy	6	3	4
(Italy) C Caratti	6^{4}	4
Q	(Spain) J L Rascon	7^{7}	6

Second round
3	(United States) A Agassi	6	1	7^{7}
(Germany) B Karbacher	4	6	6^{4}
(France) J-P Fleurian	6	7
30	(Italy) A Gaudenzi	1	5
20	(Netherlands) J Siemerink	4	3
(Canada) S Lareau	6	6
Q	(Spain) J L Rascon	7	3	4
14	(Spain) A Costa	5	6	6

Third round
3	(United States) A Agassi	6	4	6
(France) J-P Fleurian	2	6	2
(Canada) S Lareau	6	6
14	(Spain) A Costa	3	1

Fourth round
3	(United States) A Agassi	6	6
(Canada) S Lareau	4	4

==== Section 4 ====
First round
(United States) J Stark	6	7
(Netherlands) J Eltingh	2	5
Q	(Czech Republic) K Nováček	6^{6}	1
(Czech Republic) M Damm	7^{8}	6
(United States) M Joyce	4	7^{7}	6
(Colombia) M Hadad	6	6^{5}	4
Q	(South Africa) D Nainkin	6	6
WC	(Australia) S Stolle	4	2

Second round
11	(Switzerland) M Rosset	4	6	6
(United States) J Stark	6	4	2
(Czech Republic) M Damm	4	3
22	(Australia) T Woodbridge	6	6
28	(France) G Forget	6^{5}	5
(United States) M Joyce	7^{7}	7
Q	(South Africa) D Nainkin	6	5	7^{7}
LL	(Sweden) T Nydahl	1	7	6^{4}

Third round
11	(Switzerland) M Rosset	7	5	7^{7}
22	(Australia) T Woodbridge	5	7	6^{4}
(United States) M Joyce	6	6
Q	(South Africa) D Nainkin	0	2

Fourth round
11	(Switzerland) M Rosset	4	1
(United States) M Joyce	6	6

=== Bottom half ===
==== Section 5 ====
First round
(Germany) A Rădulescu	6^{7}	4
(United States) R Reneberg	7^{9}	6
(Japan) S Matsuoka	6^{5}	6	6^{2}
(Spain) J Sánchez	7^{7}	4	7^{7}
(United Kingdom) C Wilkinson	3	4
(Australia) S Draper	6	6
(Slovakia) J Krošlák	5	7^{7}	2
(France) G Raoux	7	6^{5}	6

Second round
6	(Croatia) G Ivanišević	6	6
(United States) R Reneberg	4	3
(Spain) J Sánchez	6	3	6
27	(Sweden) M Larsson	4	6	2
21	(France) C Pioline	6	6
(Australia) S Draper	4	2
(France) G Raoux	4	4
12	(Ukraine) A Medvedev	6	6

Third round
6	(Croatia) G Ivanišević	6	6
(Spain) J Sánchez	0	3
21	(France) C Pioline	2	2
12	(Ukraine) A Medvedev	6	6

Fourth round
6	(Croatia) G Ivanišević	7^{7}	6
12	(Ukraine) A Medvedev	6^{4}	4

==== Section 6 ====
First round
(Spain) F Clavet	5	6	4
(Slovakia) K Kučera	7	2	6
(Germany) D Dier	4	3
(Czech Republic) P Korda	6	6
(United Kingdom) G Rusedski	6	7^{7}
WC	(United States) J Gimelstob	4	6^{5}
(Australia) J Stoltenberg	6	6
(Argentina) G Etlis	1	1

Second round
13	(Chile) M Ríos	6	6
(Slovakia) K Kučera	4	2
(Czech Republic) P Korda	6	7^{7}
19	(Australia) M Woodforde	4	6^{3}
29	(Sweden) J Björkman	6	7^{11}
(United Kingdom) G Rusedski	4	6^{9}
(Australia) J Stoltenberg	3	4
4	(United States) M Chang	6	6

Third round
13	(Chile) M Ríos	4	7^{7}	4
(Czech Republic) P Korda	6	6^{4}	6
29	(Sweden) J Björkman	3	2
4	(United States) M Chang	6	6

Fourth round
(Czech Republic) P Korda	3	6	3
4	(United States) M Chang	6	3	6

==== Section 7 ====
First round
(Morocco) K Alami	2	6^{6}
(United States) V Spadea	6	7^{8}
(Italy) S Pescosolido	6	6
(Brazil) F Meligeni	1	2
(South Africa) M Ondruska	6	4	6
(Ecuador) N Lapentti	2	6	2
(United Kingdom) T Henman	6	6
(United States) S Campbell	1	2

Second round
8	(Sweden) T Enqvist	3	5
(United States) V Spadea	6	7
(Italy) S Pescosolido	6	6
25	(Australia) M Philippoussis	4	4
23	(Netherlands) R Krajicek	6	6
(South Africa) M Ondruska	3	1
(United Kingdom) T Henman	3	6	1
10	(Spain) S Bruguera	6	3	6

Third round
(United States) V Spadea	7	6
(Italy) S Pescosolido	5	2
23	(Netherlands) R Krajicek	7	7^{7}
10	(Spain) S Bruguera	5	6^{5}

Fourth round
(United States) V Spadea	7^{7}	6
23	(Netherlands) R Krajicek	6^{1}	2

==== Section 8 ====
First round
(Spain) À Corretja	6	6
(Sweden) M Wilander	2	4
Q	(Australia) P Tramacchi	6	6
Q	(South Africa) G Stafford	3	4
(Germany) P Baur	3	4
(India) L Paes	6	6
(The Bahamas) M Knowles	3	5
(Netherlands) S Schalken	6	7

Second round
16	(United States) T Martin	7^{7}	6
(Spain) À Corretja	6^{4}	4
Q	(Australia) P Tramacchi	6^{5}	3
18	(Italy) R Furlan	7^{7}	6
32	(Switzerland) J Hlasek	6	6
(India) L Paes	1	3
(Netherlands) S Schalken	3	2
2	(United States) P Sampras	6	6

Third round
16	(United States) T Martin	6	6
18	(Italy) R Furlan	3	2
32	(Switzerland) J Hlasek	5	6^{3}
2	(United States) P Sampras	7	7^{7}

Fourth round
16	(United States) T Martin	3	4
2	(United States) P Sampras	6	6

== Qualifying ==
=== Qualifying seeds ===
1. (Ecuador) Luis Morejón (first round)
2. (Australia) Andrew Ilie (first round)
3. (Czech Republic) Karel Nováček (qualified)
4. (Sweden) Tomas Nydahl (qualifying competition)
5. (Italy) Diego Nargiso (qualifying competition)
6. (United States) Bryan Shelton (qualified)
7. (Spain) Tati Rascón (qualified)
8. (Canada) Daniel Nestor (qualified)
9. (Israel) Eyal Ran (second round)
10. (Germany) Arne Thoms (second round)
11. (South Africa) David Nainkin (qualified)
12. (Brazil) Gustavo Kuerten (second round)
13. (Spain) Emilio Benfele Álvarez (first round)
14. (Netherlands) Joost Winnink (first round)
15. (Brazil) Roberto Jabali (qualified)
16. (United Kingdom) Danny Sapsford (qualifying competition)
17. (Mexico) Óscar Ortiz (qualifying competition)
18. (Bulgaria) Orlin Stanoytchev (first round)
19. (Mexico) Alejandro Hernández (qualifying competition)
20. (United States) Steve Bryan (qualified)
21. (United Kingdom) Mark Petchey (first round)
22. (Canada) Albert Chang (first round)
23. (Italy) Daniele Musa (qualified)
24. (Finland) Tuomas Ketola (first round)

=== Qualifiers ===
1. (Italy) Daniele Musa
2. (United States) David DiLucia
3. (Czech Republic) Karel Nováček
4. (Australia) Peter Tramacchi
5. (United States) Steve Bryan
6. (United States) Bryan Shelton
7. (Spain) Tati Rascón
8. (Canada) Daniel Nestor
9. (Brazil) Roberto Jabali
10. (South Africa) Grant Stafford
11. (South Africa) David Nainkin
12. (South Africa) Robbie Koenig

=== Qualifying draw ===
==== First qualifier ====
First round
1	(Ecuador) Luis Morejón	2	4
(United States) Ivan Baron	6	6
(United States) Kenny Thorne	6	1	6
(Mexico) Leonardo Lavalle	3	6	4
(United Kingdom) Andrew Richardson	3	2
WC	(United States) Jeff Salzenstein	6	6
(United Kingdom) Miles Maclagan	1	2
23	(Italy) Daniele Musa	6	6

Second round
(United States) Ivan Baron	6	6
(United States) Kenny Thorne	3	3
WC	(United States) Jeff Salzenstein	6	6
23	(Italy) Daniele Musa	7	7

Qualifying competition
(United States) Ivan Baron	5	6	5
23	(Italy) Daniele Musa	7	1	7

==== Second qualifier ====
First round
2	(Australia) Andrew Ilie	4	6
(United States) David DiLucia	6	7
(Italy) Nicola Bruno	3	7	4
(United States) Brian Dunn	6	5	6
(Australia) Mark Draper	4	4
(United Kingdom) Nick Gould	6	6
(Czech Republic) Libor Němeček	6	6	6
24	(Finland) Tuomas Ketola	7	4	3

Second round
(United States) David DiLucia	0	6	6
(United States) Brian Dunn	6	4	2
(United Kingdom) Nick Gould	5	7	6
(Czech Republic) Libor Němeček	7	5	4

Qualifying competition
(United States) David DiLucia	6	6
(United Kingdom) Nick Gould	2	3

==== Third qualifier ====
First round
3	(Czech Republic) Karel Nováček	7	6
(United States) Louis Gloria	5	3
WC	(United States) Christopher Pressley	4	6	6
(Argentina) Rafael Serpa-Guinazu	6	4	2
(South Africa) Chris Haggard	6	3	6
(United States) Alex O'Brien	3	6	7
(United States) Brian MacPhie	2	6	7
21	(United Kingdom) Mark Petchey	6	3	6

Second round
3	(Czech Republic) Karel Nováček	6	6
WC	(United States) Christopher Pressley	4	0
(United States) Alex O'Brien	6	6
(United States) Brian MacPhie	1	1

Qualifying competition
3	(Czech Republic) Karel Nováček	3	7	6
(United States) Alex O'Brien	6	6	4

==== Fourth qualifier ====
First round
4	(Sweden) Tomas Nydahl	2	7	7
(United States) Jim Grabb	6	5	6
(United States) Francisco Montana	3	5
WC	(United States) Mashiska Washington	6	7
(Australia) Paul Kilderry	7	3	0
(Spain) Juan Albert Viloca	6	6	6
(Australia) Peter Tramacchi	6	3	6
22	(Canada) Albert Chang	3	6	1

Second round
4	(Sweden) Tomas Nydahl	6	6
WC	(United States) Mashiska Washington	1	2
(Spain) Juan Albert Viloca	3	6
(Australia) Peter Tramacchi	6	7

Qualifying competition
4	(Sweden) Tomas Nydahl	6	3	4
(Australia) Peter Tramacchi	4	6	6

==== Fifth qualifier ====
First round
5	(Italy) Diego Nargiso	6	6
(Ecuador) Pablo Campana	3	4
(Germany) Rainer Schüttler	6	2	1
(Germany) Michael Geserer	4	6	6
(Finland) Tommi Lenho	2	7	6
WC	(Brazil) André Sá	6	5	3
(France) Gilles Bastié	3	0
20	(United States) Steve Bryan	6	6

Second round
5	(Italy) Diego Nargiso	6	6
(Germany) Michael Geserer	3	4
(Finland) Tommi Lenho	4	4
20	(United States) Steve Bryan	6	6

Qualifying competition
5	(Italy) Diego Nargiso	5	5
20	(United States) Steve Bryan	7	7

==== Sixth qualifier ====
First round
6	(United States) Bryan Shelton	6	7
WC	(United States) Van Winitsky	1	5
(Japan) Yasufumi Yamamoto	6	4	6
(Australia) Ben Ellwood	2	6	3
(Germany) Patrik Kühnen	6	6
WC	(United States) David Witt	4	3
(Netherlands) Fernon Wibier	4	2
19	(Mexico) Alejandro Hernández	6	6

Second round
6	(United States) Bryan Shelton	6	6
(Japan) Yasufumi Yamamoto	1	3
(Germany) Patrik Kühnen	6	3
19	(Mexico) Alejandro Hernández	7	6

Qualifying competition
6	(United States) Bryan Shelton	5	6	6
19	(Mexico) Alejandro Hernández	7	1	3

==== Seventh qualifier ====
First round
7	(Spain) Tati Rascón	3	7	6
(United States) Brett Hansen-Dent	6	6	2
(Belarus) Max Mirnyi	6	7	6
(Italy) Pietro Pennisi	7	6	3
(United States) Scott Humphries	3	6	6
(United States) Donald Johnson	6	3	2
(Italy) Corrado Borroni	7	0	2
17	(Mexico) Óscar Ortiz	6	6	6

Second round
7	(Spain) Tati Rascón	6	6
(Belarus) Max Mirnyi	4	4
(United States) Scott Humphries	4	3
17	(Mexico) Óscar Ortiz	6	6

Qualifying competition
7	(Spain) Tati Rascón	6	6
17	(Mexico) Óscar Ortiz	3	4

==== Eighth qualifier ====
First round
8	(Canada) Daniel Nestor	6	3	6
(Japan) Hideki Kaneko	4	6	3
(United States) Alex Reichel	6	6
(United Kingdom) Andrew Foster	3	2
(Germany) Karsten Braasch	7	3	6
(Switzerland) Patrick Mohr	6	6	7
(United Kingdom) Luke Milligan	4	7	6
18	(Bulgaria) Orlin Stanoytchev	6	6	4

Second round
8	(Canada) Daniel Nestor	6	6
(United States) Alex Reichel	4	3
(Switzerland) Patrick Mohr	6	7
(United Kingdom) Luke Milligan	1	6

Qualifying competition
8	(Canada) Daniel Nestor	7	4	6
(Switzerland) Patrick Mohr	5	6	2

==== Ninth qualifier ====
First round
9	(Israel) Eyal Ran	3	6	6
(Argentina) Guillermo Cañas	6	2	2
(Sweden) Lars-Anders Wahlgren	6	6
(Spain) Álex Calatrava	2	2
(Czech Republic) Tomáš Zdrazila	3	6	6
(Armenia) Sargis Sargsian	6	4	4
(Colombia) Miguel Tobón	5	2
15	(Brazil) Roberto Jabali	7	6

Second round
9	(Israel) Eyal Ran	6	0
(Sweden) Lars-Anders Wahlgren	7	6
(Czech Republic) Tomáš Zdrazila	6	3	5
15	(Brazil) Roberto Jabali	3	6	7

Qualifying competition
(Sweden) Lars-Anders Wahlgren	1	3
15	(Brazil) Roberto Jabali	6	6

==== Tenth qualifier ====
First round
10	(Germany) Arne Thoms	6	6
(Germany) Carsten Arriens	2	4
(South Africa) Grant Stafford	6	6
(Argentina) Patricio Arnold	0	4
(Finland) Kim Tiilikainen	6	6
(Netherlands) Martijn Bok	4	2
(Colombia) Mario Rincón	7	3	1
16	(United Kingdom) Danny Sapsford	6	6	6

Second round
10	(Germany) Arne Thoms	2	3
(South Africa) Grant Stafford	6	6
(Finland) Kim Tiilikainen	2	6	3
16	(United Kingdom) Danny Sapsford	6	3	6

Qualifying competition
(South Africa) Grant Stafford	7	6
16	(United Kingdom) Danny Sapsford	5	1

==== Eleventh qualifier ====
First round
11	(South Africa) David Nainkin	7	6
(Chile) Sergio Cortés	5	4
(Germany) Christian Saceanu	6	6
(Brazil) Jaime Oncins	3	4
(Germany) Martin Zumpft	6	7
WC	(Venezuela) Maurice Ruah	4	6
(Federal Republic of Yugoslavia) Bojan Vujić	7	6
14	(Netherlands) Joost Winnink	5	3

Second round
11	(South Africa) David Nainkin	4	6	6
(Germany) Christian Saceanu	6	4	4
(Germany) Martin Zumpft	7	0	4
(Federal Republic of Yugoslavia) Bojan Vujić	6	6	6

Qualifying competition
11	(South Africa) David Nainkin	6	7
(Federal Republic of Yugoslavia) Bojan Vujić	3	5

==== Twelfth qualifier ====
First round
12	(Brazil) Gustavo Kuerten	5	6	6
(Venezuela) Jimy Szymanski	7	2	2
(Netherlands) Dennis van Scheppingen	7	7
(South Africa) Neville Godwin	5	5
(India) Mahesh Bhupathi	1	6	3
(United States) Mark Merklein	6	3	6
(South Africa) Robbie Koenig	6	3	7
13	(Spain) Emilio Benfele Álvarez	4	6	5

Second round
12	(Brazil) Gustavo Kuerten	6	3	4
(Netherlands) Dennis van Scheppingen	2	6	6
(United States) Mark Merklein	3	6	6
(South Africa) Robbie Koenig	6	3	7

Qualifying competition
(Netherlands) Dennis van Scheppingen	1	3
(South Africa) Robbie Koenig	6	6
