= 1999 Internazionali di Tennis di San Marino – Doubles =

Doubles
- 1999 Internazionali di Tennis di San Marino

Final
- Champions: (Argentina) Lucas Arnold Ker (Argentina) Mariano Hood
- Runners-up: (Czech Republic) Petr Pála (Czech Republic) Pavel Vízner
- Score: 6–3, 6–2

Details
- Draw: 16 (3WC/1Q)
- Seeds: 4

Events
Singles	Doubles
← 1998 ·	San Marino GO&FUN Open

Jiří Novák and David Rikl were the defending champions, but the pair chose to compete at Cincinnati in the same week.

Lucas Arnold Ker and Mariano Hood won the title by defeating Petr Pála and Pavel Vízner 6–3, 6–2 in the final.

== Seeds ==
1. (Italy) Cristian Brandi / (Italy) Massimo Bertolini (first round)
2. (Argentina) Lucas Arnold Ker / (Argentina) Mariano Hood (champions)
3. (Israel) Eyal Ran / (Belgium) Tom Vanhoudt (semifinals)
4. (United States) Devin Bowen / (Spain) Albert Portas (semifinals)

== Draw ==
=== Key ===
- Q = Qualifier
- WC = Wild card
- LL = Lucky loser
- Alt = Alternate
- SE = Special exempt
- PR = Protected ranking
- ITF = ITF entry
- JE = Junior exempt
- w/o = Walkover
- r = Retired
- d = Defaulted
- SR = Special ranking

=== Draw ===
First round
1	(Italy) M Bertolini (Italy) C Brandi	6	3	4
(Federal Republic of Yugoslavia) N Đorđević (Armenia) S Sargsian	4	6	6
(New Zealand) J Greenhalgh (Italy) M Valeri	5	4
(Czech Republic) P Pála (Czech Republic) P Vízner	7	6
4	(United States) D Bowen (Spain) A Portas	6	6
(Argentina) G Cañas (Argentina) M Puerta	4	2
WC	(Italy) O Camporese (Italy) V Santopadre	4	5
WC	(Italy) A Gaudenzi (Italy) D Nargiso	6	7
(Argentina) D del Río (Argentina) M Rodríguez	6	5	6
WC	(Italy) M Ardinghi (Italy) D Sanguinetti	4	7	2
(Argentina) M García (Mexico) D Roditi	2	6	6^{2}
3	(Israel) E Ran (Belgium) T Vanhoudt	6	2	7^{7}
(Czech Republic) T Cibulec (Federal Republic of Yugoslavia) D Vemić	4	6	6
(United States) M Keil (South Africa) B Talbot	6	1	3
Q	(Morocco) K Alami (Spain) J Alonso	3	2
2	(Argentina) L Arnold Ker (Argentina) M Hood	6	6

Quarterfinals
(Federal Republic of Yugoslavia) N Đorđević (Armenia) S Sargsian	2	4
(Czech Republic) P Pála (Czech Republic) P Vízner	6	6
4	(United States) D Bowen (Spain) A Portas	6	6
WC	(Italy) A Gaudenzi (Italy) D Nargiso	4	4
(Argentina) D del Río (Argentina) M Rodríguez	6^{1}	6^{2}
3	(Israel) E Ran (Belgium) T Vanhoudt	7^{7}	7^{7}
(Czech Republic) T Cibulec (Federal Republic of Yugoslavia) D Vemić	2	5
2	(Argentina) L Arnold Ker (Argentina) M Hood	6	7

Semifinals
(Czech Republic) P Pála (Czech Republic) P Vízner	6	7^{7}
4	(United States) D Bowen (Spain) A Portas	3	6^{3}
3	(Israel) E Ran (Belgium) T Vanhoudt	1	2
2	(Argentina) L Arnold Ker (Argentina) M Hood	6	6

Final
(Czech Republic) P Pála (Czech Republic) P Vízner	3	2
2	(Argentina) L Arnold Ker (Argentina) M Hood	6	6
