= 1996 Campionati Internazionali di San Marino – Doubles =

Doubles
- 1996 Campionati Internazionali di San Marino
- 1995 Champions: (Spain) Jordi Arrese (Australia) Andrew Kratzmann

Final
- Champions: (Argentina) Pablo Albano (Argentina) Lucas Arnold
- Runners-up: (Argentina) Mariano Hood (Argentina) Sebastián Prieto
- Score: 6–1, 6–3

Details
- Draw: 16
- Seeds: 4

Events
Singles	Doubles
- Campionati Internazionali di San Marino

Jordi Arrese and Andrew Kratzmann were the defending champions but did not compete that year.

Pablo Albano and Lucas Arnold won in the final 6–1, 6–3 against Mariano Hood and Sebastián Prieto.

== Seeds ==
Champion seeds are indicated in bold text while text in italics indicates the round in which those seeds were eliminated.

1. (Belgium) Libor Pimek / (South Africa) Byron Talbot (semifinals)
2. (Czech Republic) Jiří Novák / (Czech Republic) David Rikl (quarterfinals)
3. (South Africa) David Adams / (Hungary) Gábor Köves (quarterfinals)
4. (South Africa) John-Laffnie de Jager / (Sweden) David Ekerot (quarterfinals)

== Draw ==
Key

- Q = Qualifier
- WC = Wild card
- LL = Lucky loser
- Alt = Alternate
- ITF = ITF entry
- PR = Protected ranking
- SR = Special ranking
- SE = Special exempt
- JE = Junior exempt
- JR = Junior Accelerator Programme entrant
- CO = College Accelerator Programme entrant
- NG = Next Gen Accelerator Program entrant
- w/o = Walkover
- r = Retired
- d = Defaulted

First round
1	(Belgium) **L Pimek** (South Africa) **B Talbot**	**7**	**7**
(United States) B Hansen-Dent (United States) T.J. Middleton	6	6
WC	(Italy) **O Camporese** (Argentina) **M Zabaleta**	3	**6**	**6**
(Portugal) J Cunha e Silva (Australia) J Ireland	**6**	1	3
4	(South Africa) **J-L de Jager** (Sweden) **D Ekerot**	**7**	**7**
WC	(Italy) F Mordegan (Italy) D Sanguinetti	6	6
(Argentina) **M Hood** (Argentina) **S Prieto**	**6**	**6**
Q	(Italy) G Galimberti (Italy) I Gaudi	2	4
(United States) I Baron (United States) J Belloli	2	4
(Spain) **J Balcells** (Spain) **J Velasco Jr.**	**6**	**6**
(Italy) C Brandi (Italy) F Messori	6	2
3	(South Africa) **D Adams** (Hungary) **G Köves**	**7**	**6**
WC	(Italy) D Nargiso (Romania) A Voinea	1	3
(Argentina) **P Albano** (Argentina) **L Arnold**	**6**	**6**
(Czech Republic) C Doseděl (Czech Republic) P Vízner	1	3
2	(Czech Republic) **J Novák** (Czech Republic) **D Rikl**	**6**	**6**

Quarterfinals
1	(Belgium) **L Pimek** (South Africa) **B Talbot**	**6**	**6**
WC	(Italy) O Camporese (Argentina) M Zabaleta	3	4
4	(South Africa) J-L de Jager (Sweden) D Ekerot	3	6
(Argentina) **M Hood** (Argentina) **S Prieto**	**6**	**7**
(Spain) **J Balcells** (Spain) **J Velasco Jr.**	**7**	**6**
3	(South Africa) D Adams (Hungary) G Köves	5	2
(Argentina) **P Albano** (Argentina) **L Arnold**	**6**	**6**
2	(Czech Republic) J Novák (Czech Republic) D Rikl	1	4

Semifinals
1	(Belgium) L Pimek (South Africa) B Talbot	**7**	3	4
(Argentina) **M Hood** (Argentina) **S Prieto**	5	**6**	**6**
(Spain) J Balcells (Spain) J Velasco Jr.	4	6
(Argentina) **P Albano** (Argentina) **L Arnold**	**6**	**7**

Final
(Argentina) Mariano Hood (Argentina) Sebastián Prieto	1	3
(Argentina) **Pablo Albano** (Argentina) **Lucas Arnold**	**6**	**6**
