= 1995 Campionati Internazionali di San Marino – Doubles =

Doubles
- 1995 Campionati Internazionali di San Marino

Final
- Champions: (Spain) Jordi Arrese (Australia) Andrew Kratzmann
- Runners-up: (Argentina) Pablo Albano (Italy) Federico Mordegan
- Score: 7–6, 3–6, 6–2

Details
- Draw: 16 (3WC/1Q)
- Seeds: 4

Events
Singles	Doubles
- San Marino GO&FUN Open

Neil Broad and Greg Van Emburgh were the defending champions, but none competed this year. Broad chose to compete at Cincinnati during the same week.

Jordi Arrese and Andrew Kratzmann won the title by defeating Pablo Albano and Federico Mordegan 7–6, 3–6, 6–2 in the final.

== Seeds ==
1. (Italy) Cristian Brandi / (Italy) Diego Nargiso (first round)
2. (Belgium) Libor Pimek / (South Africa) Byron Talbot (quarterfinals)
3. (Spain) Jordi Arrese / (Australia) Andrew Kratzmann (champions)
4. (United States) Mike Bauer / (Spain) José Antonio Conde (first round)

== Draw ==
Key

- Q = Qualifier
- WC = Wild card
- LL = Lucky loser
- Alt = Alternate
- ITF = ITF entry
- PR = Protected ranking
- SR = Special ranking
- SE = Special exempt
- JE = Junior exempt
- JR = Junior Accelerator Programme entrant
- CO = College Accelerator Programme entrant
- NG = Next Gen Accelerator Program entrant
- w/o = Walkover
- r = Retired
- d = Defaulted

=== Draw ===
First round
1	(Italy) C Brandi (Italy) C Nargiso	3	1
(United States) B Behrens (Germany) M Zumpft	6	6
WC	(Spain) A Costa (Spain) C Costa	6	6	7
WC	(Argentina) F Davín (Argentina) H Gumy	4	7	6
3	(Spain) J Arrese (Australia) A Kratzmann	6	7
(Netherlands) S Noteboom (United States) J Waite	4	5
(Czech Republic) V Flégl (Czech Republic) P Pála	7	7
WC	(Morocco) Y El Aynaoui (Romania) A Voinea	6	6
(Italy) A Gaudenzi (Hungary) S Noszály	0	2
(Czech Republic) J Novák (Czech Republic) P Vízner	6	6
(Czech Republic) J Kodeš Jr. (Hungary) G Köves	3	6	7
4	(United States) M Bauer (Spain) JA Conde	6	4	5
(Argentina) P Albano (Italy) F Mordegan	6	7
Q	(Argentina) G Etlis (Spain) A López Morón	3	6
(United States) J Belloli (Australia) J Ireland	3	7	0
2	(Belgium) L Pimek (South Africa) B Talbot	6	6	6

Quarterfinals
(United States) B Behrens (Germany) M Zumpft	w/o
WC	(Spain) A Costa (Spain) C Costa
3	(Spain) J Arrese (Australia) A Kratzmann	6	2	7
(Czech Republic) V Flégl (Czech Republic) P Pála	4	6	6
(Czech Republic) J Novák (Czech Republic) P Vízner	6	6
(Czech Republic) J Kodeš Jr. (Hungary) G Köves	4	2
(Argentina) P Albano (Italy) F Mordegan	6	6
2	(Belgium) L Pimek (South Africa) B Talbot	4	1

Semifinals
(United States) B Behrens (Germany) M Zumpft
3	(Spain) J Arrese (Australia) A Kratzmann	w/o
(Czech Republic) J Novák (Czech Republic) P Vízner	4	5
(Argentina) P Albano (Italy) F Mordegan	6	7

Final
3	(Spain) J Arrese (Australia) A Kratzmann	7	3	6
(Argentina) P Albano (Italy) F Mordegan	6	6	2
