= 1998 Campionati Internazionali di San Marino – Doubles =

Doubles
- 1998 Campionati Internazionali di San Marino

Final
- Champions: (Czech Republic) Jiří Novák (Czech Republic) David Rikl
- Runners-up: (Argentina) Mariano Hood (Argentina) Sebastián Prieto
- Score: 6–4, 7–6

Events
Singles	Doubles
← 1997 ·	Campionati Internazionali di San Marino	· 1999 →

== Seeds ==
Champion seeds are indicated in bold text while text in italics indicates the round in which those seeds were eliminated.

1. (Argentina) Daniel Orsanic / (United States) Jack Waite (withdrew, First round)
2. (Czech Republic) **Jiří Novák** / (Czech Republic) **David Rikl (champions)**
3. (Argentina) Mariano Hood / (Argentina) Sebastián Prieto (final)
4. (Argentina) Luis Lobo / (Argentina) Mariano Puerta (semifinals)

== Draw ==
=== Key ===
- Q = Qualifier
- WC = Wild card
- LL = Lucky loser
- Alt = Alternate
- SE = Special exempt
- PR = Protected ranking
- ITF = ITF entry
- JE = Junior exempt
- w/o = Walkover
- r = Retired
- d = Defaulted
- SR = Special ranking

=== Finals ===
First round
1	(Argentina) D Orsanic (United States) J Waite
(Spain) **JA Conde** **(Spain) J Sánchez**	w/o
(Italy) **M Bertolini** **(United States) D Bowen**	**7**	**6**
(Italy) A Gaudenzi (Italy) D Scala	6	1
3	(Argentina) **M Hood** **(Argentina) S Prieto**	**6**	**6**
(Italy) O Camporese (Russia) M Safin	2	2
(Italy) **C Brandi** **(Italy) F Messori**	3	**6**	**7**
(Italy) G Galimberti (Italy) M Valeri	**6**	2	6
(Czechoslovakia) **L Pimek** **(Czech Republic) T Anzari**	**6**	**6**
(South Africa) M Barnard (South Africa) B Haygarth	4	1
4	(Argentina) **L Lobo** **(Argentina) M Puerta**	**6**	**6**
(Romania) D Pescariu (Italy) D Sanguinetti	4	2
(Italy) **M Ardinghi** **(Italy) V Santopadre**	**6**	**6**
(Argentina) D del Río (Netherlands) S Noteboom	3	4
(Australia) J Holmes (Belgium) T Vanhoudt	0	3
2	(Czech Republic) **J Novák** **(Czech Republic) D Rikl**	**6**	**6**

Quarterfinals
(Spain) JA Conde (Spain) J Sánchez	3	3
(Italy) **M Bertolini** **(United States) D Bowen**	**6**	**6**
3	(Argentina) **M Hood** **(Argentina) S Prieto**	**6**	**6**
(Italy) C Brandi (Italy) F Messori	3	1
(Czechoslovakia) L Pimek (Czech Republic) T Anzari	1	3
4	(Argentina) **L Lobo** **(Argentina) M Puerta**	**6**	**6**
(Italy) M Ardinghi (Italy) V Santopadre	4	3
2	(Czech Republic) **J Novák** **(Czech Republic) D Rikl**	**6**	**6**

Semifinals
(Italy) M Bertolini (United States) D Bowen	5	**6**	2
3	(Argentina) **M Hood** **(Argentina) S Prieto**	**7**	3	**6**
4	(Argentina) L Lobo (Argentina) M Puerta	4	5
2	(Czech Republic) **J Novák** **(Czech Republic) D Rikl**	**6**	**7**

Final
3	(Argentina) M Hood (Argentina) S Prieto	4	6
2	(Czech Republic) **J Novák** **(Czech Republic) D Rikl**	**6**	**7**
