= 1998 Campionati Internazionali di San Marino =

- Date: 10–16 August
- Edition: 10th
- Category: WorldSeries
- Draw: 32S / 16D
- Prize money: $275,000
- Surface: Clay / outdoor
- Location: City of San Marino, San Marino

Champions

Singles
- (Slovakia) Dominik Hrbatý

Doubles
- (Czech Republic) Jiří Novák / (Czech Republic) David Rikl
← 1997 ·	Campionati Internazionali di San Marino	· 1999 →

The 1998 Campionati Internazionali di San Marino was a men's tennis tournament played on outdoor clay courts in City of San Marino, San Marino that was part of the World Series of the 1998 ATP Tour. It was the tenth edition of the tournament and was held from 10 August until 16 August 1998. Third-seeded Dominik Hrbatý won the singles titles.

== Finals ==
=== Singles ===
(Slovakia) Dominik Hrbatý defeated (Argentina) Mariano Puerta, 6–2, 7–5

- It was Hrbatý's first singles title of the year.

=== Doubles ===
(Czech Republic) Jiří Novák / (Czech Republic) David Rikl defeated (Argentina) Mariano Hood / (Argentina) Sebastián Prieto, 6–4, 7–6
