= 1995 Campionati Internazionali di San Marino =

- Date: 7–13 August
- Edition: 7th
- Category: World Series
- Draw: 32S / 16D
- Prize money: $275,000
- Surface: Clay / outdoor
- Location: City of San Marino, San Marino

Champions

Singles
- (Austria) Thomas Muster

Doubles
- (Spain) Jordi Arrese / (Australia) Andrew Kratzmann
- Campionati Internazionali di San Marino

The 1995 Campionati Internazionali di San Marino was a men's tennis tournament played on outdoor clay courts at the Centro Tennis Cassa di Risparmio di Fonte dell'Ovo in the City of San Marino in San Marino and was part of the World Series of the 1995 ATP Tour. It was the seventh edition of the tournament and was held from 7 August until 13 August 1995. First-seeded Thomas Muster, who entered the main draw on a wildcard, won the singles title, his second at the event after 1993.

== Finals ==
=== Singles ===
(Austria) Thomas Muster defeated (Italy) Andrea Gaudenzi 6–2, 6–0

- It was Muster's 9th title of the year and the 32nd of his career.

=== Doubles ===
(Spain) Jordi Arrese / (Australia) Andrew Kratzmann defeated (Argentina) Pablo Albano / (Italy) Federico Mordegan 7–6, 3–6, 6–2
