= 2003 Mutua Madrileña Masters Madrid – Singles =

Singles
- 2003 Mutua Madrileña Masters Madrid

Final
- Champion: (Spain) Juan Carlos Ferrero
- Runner-up: (Chile) Nicolas Massú
- Score: 6–3, 6–4, 6–3

Details
- Draw: 48 (3WC/6Q)
- Seeds: 16

Events
| Singles | Doubles |
- Madrid Open

Juan Carlos Ferrero defeated Nicolás Massú in the final, 6–3, 6–4, 6–3 to win the singles tennis title at the 2003 Madrid Open. It was his only title won as the reigning world No. 1 player.

Andre Agassi was the reigning champion, but did not compete this year.

== Seeds ==
A champion seed is indicated in bold text while text in italics indicates the round in which that seed was eliminated. All sixteen seeds received a bye into the second round.

1. (Spain) **Juan Carlos Ferrero (champion)**
2. (United States) Andy Roddick (third round)
3. (Switzerland) Roger Federer (semifinals)
4. (Germany) Rainer Schüttler (second round)
5. (Spain) Carlos Moyà (third round)
6. (France) Sébastien Grosjean (quarterfinals)
7. (Thailand) Paradorn Srichaphan (quarterfinals)
8. (Czech Republic) Jiří Novák (third round)
9. (Australia) Mark Philippoussis (second round)
10. (Netherlands) Sjeng Schalken (second round)
11. (Netherlands) Martin Verkerk (second round)
12. (Argentina) Agustín Calleri (second round)
13. (Brazil) Gustavo Kuerten (second round)
14. (Spain) Tommy Robredo (second round)
15. (Morocco) Younes El Aynaoui (semifinals)
16. (Spain) Félix Mantilla (third round)

== Draw ==
Key

- Q = Qualifier
- WC = Wild card
- LL = Lucky loser
- Alt = Alternate
- ITF = ITF entry
- PR = Protected ranking
- SR = Special ranking
- SE = Special exempt
- JE = Junior exempt
- JR = Junior Accelerator Programme entrant
- CO = College Accelerator Programme entrant
- NG = Next Gen Accelerator Program entrant
- w/o = Walkover
- r = Retired
- d = Defaulted

=== Finals ===
Quarterfinals
1 | **(Spain) Juan Carlos Ferrero** | **6** | **6**
7 | (Thailand) Paradorn Srichaphan | 4 | 2
3 | **(Switzerland) Roger Federer** | 4 | **7^{7}** | **6**
11 | (Spain) Feliciano López | **6** | 6^{3} | 4
6 | (France) Sébastien Grosjean | **6** | 6^{6} | 2
15 | **(Morocco) Younes El Aynaoui** | 3 | **7^{8}** | **6**
(Argentina) Juan Ignacio Chela | **7^{7}** | 4 | 4
**(Chile) Nicolás Massú** | 6^{5} | **6** | **6**

Semifinals
1 | (Spain) **Juan Carlos Ferrero** | **6** | 4 | **6**
3 | (Switzerland) Roger Federer | 4 | **6** | 4
15 | (Morocco) Younes El Aynaoui | 5 | 4
(Chile) **Nicolas Massú** | **7** | **6**

Final
1 | (Spain) **Juan Carlos Ferrero** | **6** | **6** | **6**
(Chile) Nicolas Massú | 3 | 4 | 3

=== Top half ===
==== Section 1 ====
First round
(South Africa) **W Ferreira** | **7^{9}** | **7^{7}**
(Croatia) I Ljubičić | 6^{7} | 6^{5}
(Russia) Y Kafelnikov | 3 | r
Q | (Sweden) **T Enqvist** | **6**
Q | (United States) **J-M Gambill** | **6** | **6**
(Russia) N Davydenko | 3 | 3
(Chile) F González | 3 | 6^{3}
(Spain) **A Costa** | **6** | **7^{7}**

Second round
1 | (Spain) **J C Ferrero** | **6** | 2 | **7^{7}**
(South Africa) W Ferreira | 3 | **6** | 6^{4}
Q | (Sweden) T Enqvist | 2 | 6^{3}
16 | (Spain) **F Mantilla** | **6** | **7^{7}**
10 | (Netherlands) S Schalken | 6^{6} | 2
Q | (United States) **J-M Gambill** | **7^{8}** | **6**
(Spain) A Costa | 3 | **7^{7}** | 1
7 | (Thailand) **P Srichaphan** | **6** | 6^{5} | **6**

Third round
1 | (Spain) **J C Ferrero** | **7^{7}** | **7^{7}**
16 | (Spain) F Mantilla | 6^{2} | 6^{0}
Q | (United States) J-M Gambill | 5 | 4
7 | (Thailand) **P Srichaphan** | **7** | **6**

Quarterfinals
1 | (Spain) **J C Ferrero** | **6** | **6**
7 | (Thailand) P Srichaphan | 4 | 2

==== Section 2 ====
First round
WC | (Spain) **À Corretja** | **6** | 3 | **6**
WC | (Spain) R Nadal | 2 | **6** | 4
(United States) **M Fish** | **7^{7}** | **6**
(United Kingdom) T Henman | 6^{4} | 3
(Argentina) M Zabaleta | 2 | **6** | 3
(Spain) **F López** | **6** | 3 | **6**
(Finland) J Nieminen | **6** | 5 | 2
(Argentina) **G Gaudio** | 3 | **7** | **6**

Second round
3 | (Switzerland) **R Federer** | **6** | **6**
WC | (Spain) À Corretja | 4 | 3
(United States) **M Fish** | **7^{16}** | **6**
14 | (Spain) T Robredo | 6^{14} | 2
9 | (Australia) M Philippoussis | 4 | **6** | 3
(Spain) **F López** | **6** | 3 | **6**
(Argentina) G Gaudio | **6** | 5 | 3
5 | (Spain) **C Moyá** | 3 | **7** | **6**

Third round
3 | (Switzerland) **R Federer** | **6** | **7^{7}**
(United States) M Fish | 3 | 6^{4}
(Spain) **F López** | 6^{5} | **6** | **7**
5 | (Spain) C Moyá | **7^{7}** | 1 | 5

Quarterfinals
3 | (Switzerland) **R Federer** | 4 | **7^{7}** | **6**
(Spain) F López | **6** | 6^{3} | 4

=== Bottom half ===
==== Section 3 ====
First round
Q | (Spain) **D Ferrer** | 1 | **6** | **6**
(Russia) M Youzhny | **6** | 4 | 4
(United States) **V Spadea** | **6** | **7**
Q | (Belgium) C Rochus | 4 | 5
(Russia) M Safin | **6** | 5 | 4
(Sweden) **J Björkman** | 4 | **7** | **6**
Q | (Belgium) O Rochus | 3 | 3
(United States) **R Ginepri** | **6** | **6**

Second round
6 | (France) **S Grosjean** | **6** | **6**
Q | (Spain) D Ferrer | 4 | 2
(United States) **V Spadea** | **7^{7}** | 3 | **6**
12 | (Argentina) A Calleri | 6^{5} | **6** | 3
15 | (Morocco) **Y El Aynaoui** | **6** | **6**
(Sweden) J Björkman | 4 | 4
(United States) **R Ginepri** | **6** | **6**
4 | (Germany) R Schüttler | 2 | 4

Third round
6 | (France) **S Grosjean** | **6** | **6**
(United States) V Spadea | 3 | 2
15 | (Morocco) **Y El Aynaoui** | **6** | **7^{7}**
(United States) R Ginepri | 4 | 6^{5}

Quarterfinals
6 | (France) S Grosjean | **6** | 6^{6} | 2
15 | (Morocco) **Y El Aynaoui** | 3 | **7^{8}** | **6**

==== Section 4 ====
First round
(France) A Clément | 6^{3} | **6** | 3
(Slovakia) **K Kučera** | **7^{7}** | 4 | **6**
Q | (Spain) A Martín | 4 | **6** | 1
(Argentina) **J I Chela** | **6** | 1 | **6**
WC | (Spain) F Verdasco | 6^{2} | 4
(Chile) **N Massú** | **7^{7}** | **6**
(United States) J Blake | 5 | 2
(Belarus) **M Mirnyi** | **7** | **6**

Second round
8 | (Czech Republic) **J Novák** | **6** | 1 | **6**
(Slovakia) K Kučera | 2 | **6** | 2
(Argentina) **J I Chela** | **6** | **6**
11 | (Netherlands) M Verkerk | 2 | 2
13 | (Brazil) G Kuerten | 3 | 5
(Chile) **N Massú** | **6** | **7**
(Belarus) M Mirnyi | 1 | **7^{11}** | 5
2 | (United States) **A Roddick** | **6** | 6^{9} | **7**

Third round
8 | (Czech Republic) J Novák | **6** | 6^{5} | 2
(Argentina) **J I Chela** | 3 | **7^{7}** | **6**
(Chile) **N Massú** | **7^{7}** | **6**
2 | (United States) A Roddick | 6^{3} | 2

Quarterfinals
(Argentina) J I Chela | **7^{7}** | 4 | 4
(Chile) **N Massú** | 6^{5} | **6** | **6**

== Qualifying ==
=== Qualifying seeds ===
1. (United States) Taylor Dent (first round)
2. (Belgium) **Olivier Rochus (qualified)**
3. (Ecuador) Nicolás Lapentti (first round)
4. (United States) **Jan-Michael Gambill (qualified)**
5. (Spain) **Alberto Martín (qualified)**
6. (Netherlands) Raemon Sluiter (qualifying competition)
7. (Slovakia) Dominik Hrbatý (first round)
8. (Spain) Fernando Vicente (qualifying competition)
9. (France) Antony Dupuis (first round)
10. (Spain) Rubén Ramírez Hidalgo (first round)
11. (Spain) **David Ferrer (qualified)**
12. (Belgium) **Christophe Rochus (qualified)**

=== Qualifiers ===
1. (Belgium) **Christophe Rochus**
2. (Belgium) **Olivier Rochus**
3. (Sweden) **Thomas Enqvist**
4. (United States) **Jan-Michael Gambill**
5. (Spain) **Alberto Martín**
6. (Spain) **David Ferrer**

=== Qualifying draw ===
==== First qualifier ====
First round
1 | (United States) Taylor Dent | 3 | **7** | 4
Alt | **(Argentina) Martín Rodríguez** | **6** | 5 | **6**
WC | (Romania) Andrei Pavel
12 | **(Belgium) Christophe Rochus** | w/o

Qualifying competition
Alt | (Argentina) Martín Rodríguez | **7^{7}** | 0 | 1
12 | **(Belgium) Christophe Rochus** | 6^{2} | **6** | **6**

==== Second qualifier ====
First round
2 | **(Belgium) Olivier Rochus** | w/o
(Romania) Adrian Voinea
**(Spain) Galo Blanco** | **6** | **6**
10 | (Spain) Rubén Ramírez Hidalgo | 4 | 4

Qualifying competition
2 | **(Belgium) Olivier Rochus** | **6** | **6**
(Spain) Galo Blanco | 4 | 2

==== Third qualifier ====
First round
3 | (Ecuador) Nicolás Lapentti | **7** | 4 | 4
WC | **(Spain) Tati Rascón** | 5 | **6** | **6**
**(Sweden) Thomas Enqvist** | **6** | **7**
9 | (France) Antony Dupuis | 3 | 5

Qualifying competition
WC | (Spain) Tati Rascón | 4 | 1
**(Sweden) Thomas Enqvist** | **6** | **6**

==== Fourth qualifier ====
First round
4 | **(United States) Jan-Michael Gambill** | **7** | **6**
WC | (Romania) Florin Mergea | 5 | 2
**(United States) Bob Bryan** | **6** | **6**
7 | (Slovakia) Dominik Hrbatý | 3 | 2

Qualifying competition
4 | **(United States) Jan-Michael Gambill** | **7^{7}** | **7^{7}**
(United States) Bob Bryan | 6^{4} | 6^{5}

==== Fifth qualifier ====
First round
5 | **(Spain) Alberto Martín** | **6** | **6**
(Argentina) Gastón Etlis | 2 | 4
(Switzerland) Michel Kratochvil | 3 | **6** | 5
8 | **(Spain) Fernando Vicente** | **6** | 2 | **7**

Qualifying competition
5 | **(Spain) Alberto Martín** | **7^{7}** | 2 | **7^{7}**
8 | (Spain) Fernando Vicente | 6^{5} | **6** | 6^{3}

==== Sixth qualifier ====
First round
6 | **(Netherlands) Raemon Sluiter** | **7** | **7^{9}**
WC | (Serbia and Montenegro) Nenad Zimonjić | 5 | 6^{7}
(Spain) Álex Calatrava | 3 | **6** | 2
11 | **(Spain) David Ferrer** | **6** | 2 | **6**

Qualifying competition
6 | (Netherlands) Raemon Sluiter | 4 | 1
11 | **(Spain) David Ferrer** | **6** | **6**
