= 1995 Campionati Internazionali di San Marino – Singles =

Singles
- 1995 Campionati Internazionali di San Marino

Final
- Champion: (Austria) Thomas Muster
- Runner-up: (Italy) Andrea Gaudenzi
- Score: 6–2, 6–0

Details
- Draw: 32 (3WC/4Q)
- Seeds: 8

Events
Singles	Doubles
- San Marino GO&FUN Open

Carlos Costa was the defending champion, but lost in the first round to Gastón Etlis.

Thomas Muster won the title by defeating Andrea Gaudenzi 6–2, 6–0 in the final.

== Seeds ==
1. (Austria) Thomas Muster (champion)
2. (Italy) Andrea Gaudenzi (final)
3. (Austria) Gilbert Schaller (second round)
4. (Spain) Albert Costa (quarterfinals, retired)
5. (Spain) Carlos Costa (first round)
6. (Spain) Jordi Arrese (first round)
7. (Czech Republic) Bohdan Ulihrach (first round, retired)
8. (Czech Republic) Sláva Doseděl (quarterfinals)

== Draw ==
Key

- Q = Qualifier
- WC = Wild card
- LL = Lucky loser
- Alt = Alternate
- ITF = ITF entry
- PR = Protected ranking
- SR = Special ranking
- SE = Special exempt
- JE = Junior exempt
- JR = Junior Accelerator Programme entrant
- CO = College Accelerator Programme entrant
- NG = Next Gen Accelerator Program entrant
- w/o = Walkover
- r = Retired
- d = Defaulted

=== Finals ===
Semifinals
1/WC	(Austria) Thomas Muster	6	6
(Italy) Stefano Pescosolido	4	2
(Belgium) Filip Dewulf	4	0
2	(Italy) Andrea Gaudenzi	6	6

Final
1/WC	(Austria) Thomas Muster	6	6
2	(Italy) Andrea Gaudenzi	2	0

=== Top half ===
First round
1/WC	(Austria) T Muster	6	6
(Uruguay) M Filippini	4	2
Q	(Spain) F Mantilla	6	6
Q	(Argentina) P Albano	2	4
(Denmark) F Fetterlein	7^{7}	6^{6}	3
(Romania) A Voinea	6^{3}	7^{8}	6
(Austria) H Skoff	4
7	(Czech Republic) B Ulihrach	0^{r}
4	(Spain) A Costa	6	6
(Slovakia) J Krošlák	4	3
(Argentina) H Gumy	7^{7}	7
(Sweden) L Jönsson	6^{4}	5
WC	(Italy) I Gaudi	3	6^{4}
(Italy) S Pescosolido	6	7^{7}
(Argentina) G Etlis	7^{7}	6
5	(Spain) C Costa	6^{4}	4

Second round
1/WC	(Austria) T Muster	6	6
Q	(Spain) F Mantilla	3	2
(Romania) A Voinea	6	6
(Austria) H Skoff	3	1
4	(Spain) A Costa	6	6
(Argentina) H Gumy	3	3
(Italy) S Pescosolido	4	6	7
(Argentina) G Etlis	6	3	5

Quarterfinals
1/WC	(Austria) T Muster	7^{9}	2	6
(Romania) A Voinea	6^{7}	6	4
4	(Spain) A Costa	5^{r}
(Italy) S Pescosolido	5

Semifinals
1/WC	(Austria) T Muster	6	6
(Italy) S Pescosolido	4	2

=== Bottom half ===
First round
6	(Spain) J Arrese	6^{0}	2
(Hungary) S Noszály	7^{7}	6
(Belgium) F Dewulf	7^{7}	7^{7}
(Italy) D Musa	6^{4}	6^{5}
WC	(Italy) D Nargiso	6	6
(Spain) Á López Morón	4	2
(Germany) CU Steeb	3	3
3	(Austria) G Schaller	6	6
8	(Czech Republic) S Doseděl	6	6
(Spain) R Carretero	3	2
(Argentina) F Davín	6	6
(Czech Republic) J Novák	2	4
(Spain) A Mancisidor	1	6^{3}
Q	(Italy) P Pambianco	6	7^{7}
Q	(Czech Republic) V Roubíček	1	6	5
2	(Italy) A Gaudenzi	6	4	7

Second round
(Hungary) S Noszály	6^{4}	3
(Belgium) F Dewulf	7^{7}	6
WC	(Italy) D Nargiso	7^{7}	6
3	(Austria) G Schaller	6^{4}	3
8	(Czech Republic) S Doseděl	2	6	6
(Argentina) F Davín	6	3	1
Q	(Italy) P Pambianco	3	3
2	(Italy) A Gaudenzi	6	6

Quarterfinals
(Belgium) F Dewulf	6	4	7^{7}
WC	(Italy) D Nargiso	4	6	6^{5}
8	(Czech Republic) S Doseděl	2	0
2	(Italy) A Gaudenzi	6	6

Semifinals
(Belgium) F Dewulf	4	0
2	(Italy) A Gaudenzi	6	6
