= Marcelo Charpentier =

Argentine tennis player

- Country (sports): Argentina
- Born: 11 July 1973 (age 51); Buenos Aires, Argentina
- Height: 1.80 m (5 ft 11 in)
- Turned pro: 1992
- Plays: Left-handed
- Prize money: $328,886

Singles
- Career record: 8–25
- Career titles: 0
- Highest ranking: No. 114 (16 June 1997)

Grand Slam singles results
- French Open: 2R (2000)
- Wimbledon: 1R (1997)

Doubles
- Career record: 0–4
- Career titles: 0
- Highest ranking: No. 187 (27 January 1997)

Grand Slam doubles results
- Wimbledon: Q1 (1997)

Marcelo Charpentier (born 11 July 1973) is a former professional tennis player from Argentina.

== Career ==
Charpentier was the 18s and under Orange Bowl champion in 1991.

He had his best performance on tour at the 1996 Campionati Internazionali di San Marino, getting past seeded players Hernán Gumy and Gilbert Schaller en route to the semi-finals, where he lost to Albert Costa.

In 1997 he took part in a Davis Cup tie for Argentina. He lost his only rubber, a singles match against Nicolás Lapentti from Ecuador. Also that year he appeared in two Grand Slams. He exited in the first round of the 1997 French Open, to Francisco Clavet, but did stretch the Spaniard to five sets. At Wimbledon he was beaten in the opening round by eventual runner-up Cédric Pioline.

The only other Grand Slam he took part in was the 2000 French Open and he managed to defeat world number 30 Karim Alami, in another five set match. He was unable to progress past the second round, losing to Gustavo Kuerten, who he had partnered four years earlier to win a Challenger title in Slovakia.

== Challenger titles ==
=== Singles: (2) ===
No.	Year	Tournament	Surface	Opponent	Score
1.	1996	Geneva, Switzerland	Clay	(Germany) Oliver Gross	6–2, 3–1 RET
2.	1999	Punta del Este, Uruguay	Clay	(Argentina) Martín Rodríguez	6–2, 6–2

=== Doubles: (5) ===
No.	Year	Tournament	Surface	Partner	Opponents	Score
1.	1996	Bratislava, Slovakia	Clay	(Brazil) Gustavo Kuerten	(Italy) Filippo Messori (Belgium) Tom Vanhoudt	3–6, 6–3, 7–5
2.	1996	Tashkent, Uzbekistan	Clay	(Spain) Albert Portas	(Russia) Andrei Cherkasov (Italy) Laurence Tieleman	6–1, 6–2
3.	1998	Santa Cruz, Bolivia	Clay	(Argentina) Andrés Schneiter	(Venezuela) Kepler Orellana (Venezuela) Jimy Szymanski	6–2, 6–3
4.	1999	Seville, Spain	Clay	(Puerto Rico) José Frontera	(Spain) Eduardo Nicolás (Spain) Germán Puentes	7–5, 6–3
5.	2006	Genova, Italy	Clay	(Italy) Adriano Biasella	(United Kingdom) Jamie Delgado (United Kingdom) Jamie Murray	6–4, 4–6, [13–11]
