= Álex Calatrava (tennis) =

Spanish tennis player (born 1973)

- Country (sports): Spain
- Born: 14 June 1973 (age 52) Cologne, West Germany
- Height: 1.90 m (6 ft 3 in)
- Turned pro: 1993
- Retired: 2007
- Plays: Right-handed (one-handed backhand)
- Coach: José Francisco Altur
- Prize money: $1,335,933

Singles
- Career record: 67–109
- Career titles: 1
- Highest ranking: No. 44 (12 February 2001)

Grand Slam singles results
- Australian Open: 3R (2001)
- French Open: 2R (2001, 2002)
- Wimbledon: 2R (2005)
- US Open: 2R (2004)

Doubles
- Career record: 21–29
- Career titles: 0
- Highest ranking: No. 110 (10 October 2005)

Grand Slam doubles results
- Australian Open: 3R (2005)
- French Open: 2R (2005)
- US Open: 1R (2005)
- Last updated on: 22 April 2022.

Alex Patricio Calatrava (born 14 June 1973) is a former tour tennis player from Spain, who turned professional in 1993. The right-hander won one singles title (2000, San Marino). He reached his highest ATP singles ranking of World No. 44 in February 2001.

== Tennis career ==
In 2001, Calatrava notably achieved victories over both Career Golden Slam winner Andre Agassi and 14-time Grand Slam champion Pete Sampras within days of each other, beating Agassi in the first round in Rome and Sampras in the first round of the Hamburg Masters. He would immediately lose in the second round of both tournaments, to a Qualifier in Rome and a Lucky Loser in Hamburg.

In July 2005 Calatrava was beaten by 18-year old Novak Djokovic. The Serb dispatched Calatrava in straight sets at the Umag tournament in Croatia.

== Personal ==
Calatrava was born in Germany while his parents lived there, returning to Spain live in 1980. His Spanish father, José, met his French mother, Gabrielle, while working Germany. Calatrava's uncle is the renowned architect Santiago Calatrava.

Calatrava lived in California from 1989 to 1991 and attended a high school for one year in Palm Springs. He also lived a year in Indian Wells under the guidance of Spanish coach José Higueras. He was the number one ranked junior player in California in 1991.

== ATP career finals ==
=== Singles: 3 (1 title, 2 runner-ups) ===
| Legend Grand Slam Tournaments (0–0) ATP World Tour Finals (0–0) ATP Masters 1000 Series (0–0) ATP 500 Series (0–0) ATP 250 Series (1–2) | Finals by surface Hard (0–1) Clay (1–1) Grass (0–0) Carpet (0–0) | Finals by setting Outdoors (1–2) Indoors (0–0) |

| Result | W–L | Date | Tournament | Tier | Surface | Opponent | Score |
|---|---|---|---|---|---|---|---|
| Loss | 0–1 | Mar 1998 | Casablanca, Morocco | World Series | Clay | (Italy) Andrea Gaudenzi | 4–6, 7–5, 4–6 |
| Loss | 0–2 | Mar 2000 | Delray Beach, United States | International Series | Hard | (Austria) Stefan Koubek | 1–6, 6–4, 4–6 |
| Win | 1–2 | Jul 2000 | San Marino, San Marino | International Series | Clay | (Spain) Sergi Bruguera | 7–6^{(9–7)}, 1–6, 6–4 |

=== Doubles: 1 (1 runner-up) ===
| Legend Grand Slam Tournaments (0–0) ATP World Tour Finals (0–0) ATP Masters 1000 Series (0–0) ATP 500 Series (0–1) ATP 250 Series (0–0) | Finals by surface Hard (0–0) Clay (0–1) Grass (0–0) Carpet (0–0) | Finals by setting Outdoors (0–1) Indoors (0–0) |

| Result | W–L | Date | Tournament | Tier | Surface | Partner | Opponents | Score |
|---|---|---|---|---|---|---|---|---|
| Loss | 0–1 | Aug 1999 | Kitzbühel, Austria | Championship Series | Clay | (Socialist Federal Republic of Yugoslavia) Dušan Vemić | (South Africa) Chris Haggard (Sweden) Peter Nyborg | 3–6, 7–6^{(7–4)}, 6–7^{(4–7)} |

== ATP Challenger and ITF Futures finals ==
=== Singles: 9 (4–5) ===
| Legend ATP Challenger (4–5) ITF Futures (0–0) | Finals by surface Hard (0–0) Clay (4–5) Grass (0–0) Carpet (0–0) |

| Result | W–L | Date | Tournament | Tier | Surface | Opponent | Score |
|---|---|---|---|---|---|---|---|
| Loss | 0-1 | Jul 1997 | Ostend, Belgium | Challenger | Clay | (Spain) Jordi Burillo | 6–7, 6–3, 5–7 |
| Win | 1-1 | Sep 1997 | Sevilla, Spain | Challenger | Clay | (Spain) Álex López Morón | 6–2, 6–4 |
| Loss | 1-2 | Jul 2000 | Sassuolo, Italy | Challenger | Clay | (Italy) Stefano Tarallo | 6–7^{(5–7)}, 6–3, 6–7^{(4–7)} |
| Loss | 1-3 | Aug 2000 | Geneva, Switzerland | Challenger | Clay | (France) Nicolas Thomann | 4–6, 7–6^{(7–2)}, 1–6 |
| Loss | 1-4 | Jun 2003 | Lugano, Switzerland | Challenger | Clay | (Argentina) Diego Moyano | 4–6, 6–1, 6–7^{(4–7)} |
| Win | 2-4 | May 2004 | Turin, Italy | Challenger | Clay | (Chile) Hermes Gamonal | 5–7, 6–3, 6–2 |
| Win | 3-4 | Jun 2004 | Lugano, Switzerland | Challenger | Clay | (France) Jérôme Haehnel | 6–2, 6–3 |
| Win | 4-4 | Jul 2004 | Montauban, France | Challenger | Clay | (Spain) Óscar Hernández | 6–4, 1–6, 6–3 |
| Loss | 4-5 | Jul 2004 | Rimini, Italy | Challenger | Clay | (Italy) Tomas Tenconi | 2–6, 1–6 |

=== Doubles: 7 (2–5) ===
| Legend ATP Challenger (2–5) ITF Futures (0–0) | Finals by surface Hard (0–3) Clay (2–2) Grass (0–0) Carpet (0–0) |

| Result | W–L | Date | Tournament | Tier | Surface | Partner | Opponents | Score |
|---|---|---|---|---|---|---|---|---|
| Loss | 0-1 | Aug 1995 | Istanbul, Turkey | Challenger | Hard | (Argentina) Carlos Gómez-Díaz | (Italy) Omar Camporese (Switzerland) Lorenzo Manta | 3–6, 4–6 |
| Win | 1-1 | Jul 1997 | Scheveningen, Netherlands | Challenger | Clay | (Belgium) Tom Vanhoudt | (Netherlands) Raemon Sluiter (Netherlands) Peter Wessels | 6–7, 6–2, 7–6 |
| Loss | 1-2 | Sep 1997 | Espinho, Portugal | Challenger | Clay | (Portugal) Bernardo Mota | (Spain) Álex López Morón (Spain) Juan Ignacio Carrasco | 6–4, 2–6, 5–7 |
| Loss | 1-3 | Sep 1997 | Seville, Spain | Challenger | Clay | (Spain) Jose Imaz-Ruiz | (Finland) Tuomas Ketola (Germany) Michael Kohlmann | 6–4, 1–6, 3–6 |
| Loss | 1-4 | Nov 1997 | Réunion Island, Réunion | Challenger | Hard | (France) Jérôme Golmard | (South Africa) Clinton Ferreira (Netherlands) Jan Siemerink | 2–6, 3–6 |
| Loss | 1-5 | Mar 2000 | Salinas, Ecuador | Challenger | Hard | (Spain) Emilio Benfele Álvarez | (Spain) Juan Balcells (Colombia) Mauricio Hadad | walkover |
| Win | 2-5 | Jul 2000 | Sassuolo, Italy | Challenger | Clay | (Spain) Salvador Navarro | (Italy) Daniele Bracciali (Italy) Federico Luzzi | 6–7^{(5–7)}, 6–1, 6–4 |

== Performance timeline ==
Key
| W | F | SF | QF | #R | RR | Q# | DNQ | A | NH |

(W) winner; (F) finalist; (SF) semifinalist; (QF) quarterfinalist; (#R) rounds 4, 3, 2, 1; (RR) round-robin stage; (Q#) qualification round; (DNQ) did not qualify; (A) absent; (NH) not held; (SR) strike rate (events won / competed); (W–L) win–loss record.

=== Singles ===
| Tournament | 1993 | 1994 | 1995 | 1996 | 1997 | 1998 | 1999 | 2000 | 2001 | 2002 | 2003 | 2004 | 2005 | 2006 | 2007 | SR | W–L | Win % |
|---|---|---|---|---|---|---|---|---|---|---|---|---|---|---|---|---|---|---|
Grand Slam tournaments
| Australian Open | A | A | A | A | A | 1R | A | A | 3R | 2R | Q1 | Q1 | 1R | A | A | 0 / 4 | 3–4 | 43% |
| French Open | Q1 | A | Q3 | Q2 | A | 1R | 1R | Q2 | 2R | 2R | 1R | A | 1R | Q2 | Q1 | 0 / 6 | 2–6 | 25% |
| Wimbledon | Q2 | A | A | A | Q1 | 1R | A | A | 1R | A | A | A | 2R | Q1 | Q2 | 0 / 3 | 1–3 | 25% |
| US Open | A | A | Q3 | A | A | A | A | A | 1R | A | A | 2R | Q1 | Q1 | A | 0 / 2 | 1–2 | 33% |
| Win–loss | 0–0 | 0–0 | 0–0 | 0–0 | 0–0 | 0–3 | 0–1 | 0–0 | 3–4 | 2–2 | 0–1 | 1–1 | 1–3 | 0–0 | 0–0 | 0 / 15 | 7–15 | 32% |
ATP World Tour Masters 1000
| Indian Wells | A | A | A | Q1 | A | A | A | A | 1R | A | A | Q2 | 1R | A | A | 0 / 2 | 0–2 | 0% |
| Miami | A | A | A | Q1 | A | A | A | Q1 | 2R | A | A | Q1 | 1R | A | A | 0 / 2 | 1–2 | 33% |
| Monte Carlo | A | A | A | A | A | A | A | A | 2R | A | A | A | A | A | A | 0 / 1 | 1–1 | 50% |
| Hamburg | A | A | A | A | A | A | A | A | 2R | A | Q1 | A | Q2 | A | A | 0 / 1 | 1–1 | 50% |
| Rome | A | A | A | A | A | A | A | A | 2R | 1R | A | A | Q1 | A | A | 0 / 2 | 1–2 | 33% |
| Canada | A | A | A | A | A | A | A | A | 1R | A | A | A | A | A | A | 0 / 1 | 0–1 | 0% |
| Cincinnati | A | A | A | A | A | A | A | A | 1R | A | A | A | A | A | A | 0 / 1 | 0–1 | 0% |
| Stuttgart | A | A | A | A | A | A | A | Q2 | A | Not Held | | | | | | 0 / 0 | 0–0 | – |
| Madrid | Not Held | | | | | | | | | A | Q1 | Q1 | A | A | A | 0 / 0 | 0–0 | – |
| Paris | A | A | Q1 | A | Q2 | A | A | A | A | A | A | A | A | A | A | 0 / 0 | 0–0 | – |
| Win–loss | 0–0 | 0–0 | 0–0 | 0–0 | 0–0 | 0–0 | 0–0 | 0–0 | 4–7 | 0–1 | 0–0 | 0–0 | 0–2 | 0–0 | 0–0 | 0 / 10 | 4–10 | 29% |
