= Galo Blanco =

Spanish tennis player

- Full name: Galo Blanco Díaz
- Country (sports): Spain
- Residence: Barcelona, Spain
- Born: 8 October 1976 (age 50) Oviedo, Spain
- Height: 1.73 m (5 ft 8 in)
- Turned pro: 1995
- Retired: 2006
- Plays: Right-handed (one-handed backhand)
- Prize money: $1,832,691

Singles
- Career record: 122–175
- Career titles: 1
- Highest ranking: No. 40 (25 May 1998)

Grand Slam singles results
- Australian Open: 2R (2004)
- French Open: QF (1997)
- Wimbledon: 2R (1999)
- US Open: 2R (1999, 2000)

Doubles
- Career record: 3–15
- Career titles: 0
- Highest ranking: No. 338 (8 March 2004)

Grand Slam doubles results
- Australian Open: 1R (2004)
- Last updated on: 18 November 2021.

Galo Blanco
Singles
- Career record: 122–175

Doubles
- Career record: 3–15

Coaching career (2006–)
- Feliciano López (co-trained by Albert Costa) 2006–2009; Milos Raonic 2010–2013; Filip Peliwo 2013–2014; Jürgen Melzer 2013–2014; Elias Ymer 2015–2015; Andrey Rublev; Karen Khachanov 2015–2017; Dominic Thiem 2017–2018

Coaching achievements
- Coachee singles titles total: 4 (Raonic), 1 (Melzer), 1 (Khachanov)
- Coachee doubles titles total: 1 (Melzer)
- List of notable tournaments (with champion) (Spain) 2008 Davis Cup champion (Lopez)

Galo Blanco (Spanish pronunciation: [ˈɡalo ˈβlaŋko]; (Note: In isolation, Blanco is pronounced [ˈblaŋko].) born 8 October 1976) is a retired professional tennis player from Oviedo, Spain. After many years as a professional tennis coach Blanco joined the Davis Cup steering committee in 2018.

== Tennis career ==
Blanco came closest to winning a Grand Slam title in 1997, reaching the quarterfinals of the French Open by defeating Neville Godwin, Magnus Gustafsson, Chris Woodruff and Petr Korda before losing to Pat Rafter. He won his only title in 1999 San Marino GO&FUN Open to his countryman Albert Portas and reached the final (2001 Mexican Open) and the semifinals in 2000 Majorca Open losing to eventual champion Marat Safin.

Blanco had two high-profile wins in majors, beating former 2-time US Open Champion, Patrick Rafter, in the first round of the 2000 US Open, and in beating Pete Sampras in the second round of the 2001 French Open.

Blanco lost in the second round of the 2004 Australian Open. He announced his retirement after the 2006 Torneo Godó.

== Coaching career ==
Blanco is a prominent tennis coach. He has previously coached the rising Canadian star Milos Raonic. This partnership ended in May 2013. He coached Canadian Filip Peliwo. He coached Karen Khachanov until November 2017. He coached Dominic Thiem from December 2017 until November 2018.

== Life after tennis ==
Since the beginning of 2019 Blanco has been working on the new format Davis Cup event. In June 2021, Kosmos announced the launch of an athlete management agency to be headed up by Blanco.

== ATP career finals ==
=== Singles: 2 (1 title, 1 runner-up) ===
Legend Grand Slam Tournaments (0–0) ATP World Tour Finals (0–0) ATP Masters 1000 (0–0) ATP 500 Series (0–1) ATP 250 Series (1–0)	Finals by surface Hard (0–0) Clay (1–1) Grass (0–0) Carpet (0–0)	Finals by setting Outdoors (1–1) Indoors (0–0)

Result	W–L	Date	Tournament	Tier	Surface	Opponent	Score
Win	1–0	Aug 1999	San Marino, San Marino	World Series	Clay	(Spain) Albert Portas	4–6, 6–4, 6–3
Loss	1–1	Mar 2001	Acapulco, Mexico	Championship Series	Clay	(Brazil) Gustavo Kuerten	4–6, 2–6

== ATP Challenger and ITF Futures finals ==
=== Singles: 9 (4–5) ===
Legend ATP Challenger (4–5) ITF Futures (0–0)	Finals by surface Hard (0–0) Clay (4–5) Grass (0–0) Carpet (0–0)

Result	W–L	Date	Tournament	Tier	Surface	Opponent	Score
Win	1–0	Jul 1995	Tampere, Finland	Challenger	Clay	(Sweden) Christian Bergström	6–3, 6–1
Win	2–0	Apr 1996	Prague, Czech Republic	Challenger	Clay	(Brazil) Gustavo Kuerten	6–1, 6–2
Loss	2–1	May 1996	Dresden, Germany	Challenger	Clay	(Sweden) Patrik Fredriksson	4–6, 4–6
Loss	2–2	Sep 1996	Oporto, Portugal	Challenger	Clay	(Australia) Richard Fromberg	3–6, 6–7
Loss	2–3	Nov 1996	Campinas, Brazil	Challenger	Clay	(Brazil) Gustavo Kuerten	6–7, 3–6
Win	3–3	Aug 1999	Poznań, Poland	Challenger	Clay	(Sweden) Fredrik Jonsson	6–4, 6–2
Loss	3–4	Nov 1999	Montevideo, Uruguay	Challenger	Clay	(Morocco) Karim Alami	3–6, 1–6
Loss	3–5	Aug 2002	Geneva, Switzerland	Challenger	Clay	(Belgium) Kristof Vliegen	2–6, 2–6
Win	4–5	Aug 2003	Brindisi, Italy	Challenger	Clay	(Spain) Francisco Fogués	7–5, 1–6, 7–5

== Performance timelines ==
Key
W	F	SF	QF	#R	RR	Q#	DNQ	A	NH

(W) winner; (F) finalist; (SF) semifinalist; (QF) quarterfinalist; (#R) rounds 4, 3, 2, 1; (RR) round-robin stage; (Q#) qualification round; (DNQ) did not qualify; (A) absent; (NH) not held; (SR) strike rate (events won / competed); (W–L) win–loss record.

=== Singles ===
Tournament	1996	1997	1998	1999	2000	2001	2002	2003	2004	2005	SR	W–L	Win %
Grand Slam tournaments
Australian Open	A	1R	1R	1R	1R	1R	1R	A	2R	A	0 / 7	1–7	13%
French Open	1R	QF	1R	1R	1R	4R	1R	3R	3R	Q1	0 / 9	11–9	55%
Wimbledon	A	A	1R	2R	1R	1R	1R	A	1R	A	0 / 6	1–6	14%
US Open	1R	1R	1R	2R	2R	1R	A	A	A	A	0 / 6	2–6	25%
Win–loss	0–2	4–3	0–4	2–4	1–4	3–4	0–3	2–1	3–3	0–0	0 / 28	15–28	35%
ATP Masters Series
Indian Wells	A	Q1	Q1	Q2	A	A	1R	A	A	A	0 / 1	0–1	0%
Miami	A	1R	3R	1R	1R	A	1R	A	A	A	0 / 5	2–5	29%
Monte Carlo	A	Q2	2R	A	A	3R	Q2	Q2	Q1	A	0 / 2	3–2	60%
Hamburg	A	A	1R	A	Q1	A	Q2	A	A	A	0 / 1	0–1	0%
Rome	A	A	1R	Q1	A	Q1	1R	Q1	A	A	0 / 2	0–2	0%
Stuttgart	A	A	A	A	A	Q1	Not Masters Series				0 / 0	0–0	–
Madrid	Not Held						A	Q2	A	A	0 / 0	0–0	–
Win–loss	0–0	0–1	3–4	0–1	0–1	2–1	0–3	0–0	0–0	0–0	0 / 11	5–11	31%

== Wins over top 10 ranked players ==
Season	1997	1998	1999	2000	2001	Total
Wins	2	0	0	0	2	4

=== Wins over Top 10s per season ===
#	Player	Rank	Event	Surface	Rd	Score
1997
1.	(Spain) Carlos Moyá	10	Stuttgart, Germany	Clay	2R	4–6, 7–6^{(7–3)}, 7–5
2.	(Spain) Àlex Corretja	4	Kitzbühel, Austria	Clay	3R	7–6^{(7–4)}, 7–5
2001
3.	(Spain) Juan Carlos Ferrero	9	Monte-Carlo, Monaco	Clay	2R	6–2, 7–6^{(7–3)}
4.	(United States) Pete Sampras	5	French Open, Paris, France	Clay	2R	7–6^{(7–4)}, 6–3, 6–2
