= Filippo Messori =

Italian tennis player

- Country (sports): Italy
- Born: 12 November 1973 (age 51); Modena, Italy
- Height: 5 ft 8 in (173 cm)
- Plays: Right-handed
- Prize money: $291,151

Singles
- Career record: 2–5
- Highest ranking: No. 138 (8 July 1996)

Doubles
- Career record: 22–32
- Career titles: 1
- Highest ranking: No. 63 (11 August 1997)

Grand Slam doubles results
- Australian Open: 2R (1998)
- French Open: 3R (1997)
- Wimbledon: 2R (1997)
- US Open: 1R (1997)

Grand Slam mixed doubles results
- French Open: 2R (1997)
- Wimbledon: 2R (1997)

Filippo Messori (born 12 November 1973) is a former professional tennis player from Italy. He was born in Modena.

Messori enjoyed most of his tennis success while playing doubles. During his career, he won one doubles title, and achieved a career-high doubles ranking of world No. 63 in 1997.

As of 2018, Messori lives in the Netherlands with his wife and three sons. He is currently a tennis and padel coach.

== Career finals ==
=== Doubles: 3 (1 win, 2 losses) ===
Result	W-L	Date	Tournament	Surface	Partner	Opponents	Score
Loss	1–0	Apr 1997	Estoril, Portugal	Clay	(Italy) Andrea Gaudenzi	(Brazil) Gustavo Kuerten (Brazil) Fernando Meligeni	2–6, 2–6
Win	1–1	Aug 1997	San Marino	Clay	(Italy) Cristian Brandi	(United States) Brandon Coupe (Mexico) David Roditi	7–5, 6–4
Loss	1–2	Mar 1998	Casablanca, Morocco	Clay	(Italy) Cristian Brandi	(Italy) Andrea Gaudenzi (Italy) Diego Nargiso	4–6, 6–7
