= 1997 French Open – Men's singles qualifying =

Men's singles qualifying
- 1997 French Open

Events
| Singles | men | women | | boys | girls |
| Doubles | men | women | mixed | boys | girls |
| WC Singles | men | women | quad |
| WC Doubles | men | women | quad |
| Legends | −45 | 45+ | women |

Qualification
| Singles | men | women |
- French Open

Players who neither had high enough rankings nor received wild cards to enter the main draw of the annual French Open Tennis Championships participated in a qualifying tournament held in the week before the event.

== Seeds ==
1. (Spain) Albert Portas (qualified)
2. (New Zealand) Brett Steven (first round)
3. (Ecuador) Nicolás Lapentti (qualified)
4. (Romania) Dinu Pescariu (first round)
5. (Germany) Marcello Craca (first round)
6. (Germany) Jens Knippschild (qualified)
7. (Costa Rica) Juan-Antonio Marin (second round)
8. (Argentina) Marcelo Charpentier (qualifying competition, lucky loser)
9. (Uzbekistan) Oleg Ogorodov (first round)
10. (Argentina) Lucas Arnold Ker (first round)
11. (United States) Justin Gimelstob (first round)
12. (Belgium) Filip Dewulf (qualified)
13. (Brazil) Jaime Oncins (first round)
14. (Denmark) Frederik Fetterlein (qualifying competition, lucky loser)
15. (Spain) Fernando Vicente (second round)
16. (Romania) Răzvan Sabău (first round)
17. (Russia) Andrey Cherkasov (second round)
18. (Spain) Jacobo Diaz-Ruiz (first round)
19. (Spain) Alberto Martín (qualified)
20. (Israel) Eyal Ran (first round)
21. (The Bahamas) Mark Knowles (first round)
22. (Belgium) Dick Norman (qualified)
23. (Argentina) Martin Stringari (second round)
24. (Hungary) József Krocskó (qualifying competition, lucky loser)
25. (Argentina) Gastón Etlis (qualified)
26. (Venezuela) Nicolás Pereira (second round)
27. (Russia) Andrei Merinov (qualified)
28. (United States) Steve Bryan (qualifying competition)
29. (Spain) Julián Alonso (second round)
30. (Sweden) Lars Jonsson (first round)
31. (United States) Jeff Salzenstein (first round)
32. (Netherlands) Fernon Wibier (qualifying competition)

== Qualifiers ==
1. (Spain) Albert Portas
2. (Spain) Jordi Burillo
3. (Ecuador) Nicolás Lapentti
4. (Zimbabwe) Wayne Black
5. (Russia) Andrei Merinov
6. (Germany) Jens Knippschild
7. (France) Rodolphe Gilbert
8. (Argentina) Gastón Etlis
9. (Italy) Cristiano Caratti
10. (Argentina) Miguel Pastura
11. (Belgium) Dick Norman
12. (Belgium) Filip Dewulf
13. (Austria) Wolfgang Schranz
14. (Spain) Alberto Martín
15. (Spain) Salvador Navarro
16. (Paraguay) Ramón Delgado

== Lucky losers ==
1. (Argentina) Marcelo Charpentier
2. (Denmark) Frederik Fetterlein
3. (Hungary) József Krocskó

== Qualifying draw ==
Key

- Q = Qualifier
- WC = Wild card
- LL = Lucky loser
- Alt = Alternate
- ITF = ITF entry
- PR = Protected ranking
- SR = Special ranking
- SE = Special exempt
- JE = Junior exempt
- JR = Junior Accelerator Programme entrant
- CO = College Accelerator Programme entrant
- NG = Next Gen Accelerator Program entrant
- w/o = Walkover
- r = Retired
- d = Defaulted

=== First qualifier ===
First round
1 | (Spain) Albert Portas | 3 | 6 | 16
(Argentina) Francisco Cabello | 6 | 2 | 14
(South Africa) David Nainkin | 0 | 2
(Spain) David Salvador-Estepa | 6 | 6
(Romania) Ionuț Moldovan | 4 | 7^{7} | 3
WC | (France) Charles Aufy | 6 | 6^{4} | 6
(Germany) Dirk Dier | 7 | 6
31 | (United States) Jeff Salzenstein | 5 | 3

Second round
1 | (Spain) Albert Portas | 6 | 6
(Spain) David Salvador-Estepa | 1 | 2
WC | (France) Charles Aufy | 6 | 3 | 3
(Germany) Dirk Dier | 2 | 6 | 6

Qualifying competition
1 | (Spain) Albert Portas | 6 | 7^{8}
(Germany) Dirk Dier | 3 | 6^{6}

=== Second qualifier ===
First round
2 | (New Zealand) Brett Steven | 4 | 2
(Spain) Jordi Burillo | 6 | 6
(France) Frederic Vitoux | 2 | 7^{8} | 6
(Hungary) Attila Sávolt | 6 | 6^{6} | 2
(Ecuador) Luis Morejón | 7^{8} | 7^{7}
(France) Nicolas Thomann | 6^{6} | 6^{2}
(United States) Jared Palmer | 2 | 0^{r}
32 | (Netherlands) Fernon Wibier | 6 | 1

Second round
(Spain) Jordi Burillo | 6 | 6
(France) Frederic Vitoux | 4 | 2
(Ecuador) Luis Morejón | 6^{6} | 6 | 8
32 | (Netherlands) Fernon Wibier | 7^{8} | 4 | 10

Qualifying competition
(Spain) Jordi Burillo | 6 | 6
32 | (Netherlands) Fernon Wibier | 1 | 3

=== Third qualifier ===
First round
3 | (Ecuador) Nicolás Lapentti | 6 | 6
WC | (France) Nicolas Kischkewitz | 3 | 2
(Argentina) Carlos Gómez-Díaz | 6^{0} | 4
(France) Jean-Philippe Fleurian | 7^{7} | 6
(Brazil) Márcio Carlsson | 1 | 3
(Austria) Stefan Koubek | 6 | 6
(Austria) Horst Skoff | 6 | 4 | 6
30 | (Sweden) Lars Jonsson | 4 | 6 | 3

Second round
3 | (Ecuador) Nicolás Lapentti | 2 | 7^{7} | 6
(France) Jean-Philippe Fleurian | 6 | 6^{5} | 2
(Austria) Stefan Koubek | 6 | 2 | 4
(Austria) Horst Skoff | 4 | 6 | 6

Qualifying competition
3 | (Ecuador) Nicolás Lapentti | 6 | 4 | 6
(Austria) Horst Skoff | 2 | 6 | 4

=== Fourth qualifier ===
First round
4 | (Romania) Dinu Pescariu | 5 | 4
(Czech Republic) David Škoch | 7 | 6
(Zimbabwe) Wayne Black | 3 | 6 | 6
(Argentina) Martin Rodriguez | 6 | 3 | 4
(Belgium) Kris Goossens | 2 | 4
WC | (France) Olivier Mutis | 6 | 6
(Argentina) Federico Browne | 2 | 2
29 | (Spain) Julián Alonso | 6 | 6

Second round
(Czech Republic) David Škoch | 4 | 5
(Zimbabwe) Wayne Black | 6 | 7
WC | (France) Olivier Mutis | 6 | 4 | 11
29 | (Spain) Julián Alonso | 4 | 6 | 9

Qualifying competition
(Zimbabwe) Wayne Black | 3 | 6 | 6
WC | (France) Olivier Mutis | 6 | 3 | 0

=== Fifth qualifier ===
First round
5 | (Germany) Marcello Craca | 6 | 5 | 0^{r}
(Germany) Carsten Arriens | 3 | 7 | 3
(Australia) Allen Belobrajdic | 4 | 3
(Australia) Michael Tebbutt | 6 | 6
(United Kingdom) Mark Petchey | 2 | 2
(United States) Cecil Mamiit | 6 | 6
(Brazil) Francisco Costa | 2 | 5
27 | (Russia) Andrei Merinov | 6 | 7

Second round
(Germany) Carsten Arriens | 6 | 6
(Australia) Michael Tebbutt | 3 | 3
(United States) Cecil Mamiit | 1 | 2
27 | (Russia) Andrei Merinov | 6 | 6

Qualifying competition
(Germany) Carsten Arriens | 6^{3} | 0
27 | (Russia) Andrei Merinov | 7^{7} | 6

=== Sixth qualifier ===
First round
6 | (Germany) Jens Knippschild | 6 | 6
(Italy) Davide Sanguinetti | 2 | 3
(Italy) Vincenzo Santopadre | 6 | 6
(United Kingdom) Nick Weal | 4 | 0
(Austria) Markus Hipfl | 3 | 6^{8}
(Netherlands) Martijn Bok | 6 | 7^{10}
(Venezuela) Maurice Ruah | 7^{7} | 5 | 10
28 | (United States) Steve Bryan | 6^{3} | 7 | 12

Second round
6 | (Germany) Jens Knippschild | 6 | 6^{5} | 6
(Italy) Vincenzo Santopadre | 3 | 7^{7} | 3
(Netherlands) Martijn Bok | 5 | 6 | 4
28 | (United States) Steve Bryan | 7 | 4 | 6

Qualifying competition
6 | (Germany) Jens Knippschild | 3 | 7^{7} | 6
28 | (United States) Steve Bryan | 6 | 6^{4} | 2

=== Seventh qualifier ===
First round
7 | (Costa Rica) Juan-Antonio Marin | 7 | 6
(South Africa) Kevin Ullyett | 5 | 2
(France) Rodolphe Gilbert | 6 | 6
(United Kingdom) Danny Sapsford | 3 | 3
(France) Jean-Baptiste Perlant | 6 | 6
(Italy) Mosé Navarra | 3 | 2
(Germany) Michael Kohlmann | 3 | 1
26 | (Venezuela) Nicolás Pereira | 6 | 6

Second round
7 | (Costa Rica) Juan-Antonio Marin | 4 | 1
(France) Rodolphe Gilbert | 6 | 6
(France) Jean-Baptiste Perlant | 6 | 6
26 | (Venezuela) Nicolás Pereira | 3 | 3

Qualifying competition
(France) Rodolphe Gilbert | 7^{7} | 5 | 6
(France) Jean-Baptiste Perlant | 6^{4} | 7 | 4

=== Eighth qualifier ===
First round
8 | (Argentina) Marcelo Charpentier | 6 | 6
(Italy) Gianluca Pozzi | 3 | 1
WC | (France) Rodolphe Cadart | 6 | 4 | 6
(United Kingdom) Luke Milligan | 3 | 6 | 1
(United States) Alex Reichel | 3 | 4
(Slovakia) Martin Hromec | 6 | 6
(Italy) Marco Meneschincheri | 3 | 6 | 2
25 | (Argentina) Gastón Etlis | 6 | 4 | 6

Second round
8 | (Argentina) Marcelo Charpentier | 6 | 6
WC | (France) Rodolphe Cadart | 3 | 4
(Slovakia) Martin Hromec | 2 | 4
25 | (Argentina) Gastón Etlis | 6 | 6

Qualifying competition
8 | (Argentina) Marcelo Charpentier | 6 | 3 | 2
25 | (Argentina) Gastón Etlis | 4 | 6 | 6

=== Ninth qualifier ===
First round
9 | (Uzbekistan) Oleg Ogorodov | 6 | 4 | 3
(Italy) Nicola Bruno | 4 | 6 | 6
(Italy) Omar Camporese | 6 | 7
(Italy) Daniele Balducci | 3 | 5
(Italy) Cristiano Caratti | 7 | 6^{7} | 6
(Sweden) Fredrik Bergh | 5 | 7^{9} | 3
(Argentina) Guillermo Cañas | 4 | 1
23 | (Argentina) Martin Stringari | 6 | 6

Second round
(Italy) Nicola Bruno | 0 | 6 | 6
(Italy) Omar Camporese | 6 | 4 | 8
(Italy) Cristiano Caratti | 6 | 4 | 6
23 | (Argentina) Martin Stringari | 3 | 6 | 3

Qualifying competition
(Italy) Omar Camporese | 6 | 6^{5} | 2
(Italy) Cristiano Caratti | 2 | 7^{7} | 6

=== Tenth qualifier ===
First round
10 | (Argentina) Lucas Arnold Ker | 2 | 6 | 3
(France) Thierry Guardiola | 6 | 3 | 6
(Uruguay) Federico Dondo | 0 | 3
(Argentina) Miguel Pastura | 6 | 6
WC | (France) Régis Lavergne | 7 | 6
(Israel) Raviv Weidenfeld | 5 | 2
(United States) Jim Grabb | 1 | 7 | 2
24 | (Hungary) József Krocskó | 6 | 5 | 6

Second round
(France) Thierry Guardiola | 5 | 1
(Argentina) Miguel Pastura | 7 | 6
WC | (France) Régis Lavergne | 4 | 6 | 3
24 | (Hungary) József Krocskó | 6 | 4 | 6

Qualifying competition
(Argentina) Miguel Pastura | 6 | 5 | 6
24 | (Hungary) József Krocskó | 4 | 7 | 1

=== Eleventh qualifier ===
First round
11 | (United States) Justin Gimelstob | 2 | 4
(Italy) Filippo Messori | 6 | 6
(Netherlands) Martijn Belgraver | 1 | 4
(Spain) Óscar Burrieza | 6 | 6
(Australia) Jaymon Crabb | 6 | 7
(Czech Republic) David Rikl | 4 | 5
(Germany) Rainer Schüttler | 6 | 4 | 1
22 | (Belgium) Dick Norman | 2 | 6 | 6

Second round
(Italy) Filippo Messori | 6 | 7
(Spain) Óscar Burrieza | 0 | 5
(Australia) Jaymon Crabb | 2 | 3
22 | (Belgium) Dick Norman | 6 | 6

Qualifying competition
(Italy) Filippo Messori | 1 | 4
22 | (Belgium) Dick Norman | 6 | 6

=== Twelfth qualifier ===
First round
12 | (Belgium) Filip Dewulf | 6 | 6
(Italy) Stefano Pescosolido | 4 | 4
(United States) Brian MacPhie | 2 | 7^{10} | 4
(France) Cyril Buscaglione | 6 | 6^{8} | 6
(Spain) Joan Balcells | 6 | 3 | 6
(Germany) Christian Vinck | 0 | 6 | 4
(France) Julien Chauvin | 3 | 6 | 6
21 | (The Bahamas) Mark Knowles | 6 | 4 | 4

Second round
12 | (Belgium) Filip Dewulf | 4 | 6 | 6
(France) Cyril Buscaglione | 6 | 2 | 3
(Spain) Joan Balcells | 1^{r}
(France) Julien Chauvin | 6

Qualifying competition
12 | (Belgium) Filip Dewulf | 6 | 6
(France) Julien Chauvin | 3 | 4

=== Thirteenth qualifier ===
First round
13 | (Brazil) Jaime Oncins | 1 | 2
(Spain) Alex Lopez-Moron | 6 | 6
(Austria) Herbert Wiltschnig | 7^{7} | 4 | 2
(Germany) Lars Rehmann | 6^{3} | 6 | 6
(United Kingdom) Andrew Richardson | 7^{7} | 3 | 2
WC | (France) Jean-François Bachelot | 6^{5} | 6 | 6
(Austria) Wolfgang Schranz | 6 | 7
20 | (Israel) Eyal Ran | 2 | 5

Second round
(Spain) Alex Lopez-Moron | 6 | 6
(Germany) Lars Rehmann | 3 | 3
WC | (France) Jean-François Bachelot | 6^{4} | 4
(Austria) Wolfgang Schranz | 7^{7} | 6

Qualifying competition
(Spain) Alex Lopez-Moron | 5 | 6 | 3
(Austria) Wolfgang Schranz | 7 | 4 | 6

=== Fourteenth qualifier ===
First round
14 | (Denmark) Frederik Fetterlein | 6 | 6
(South Africa) Chris Haggard | 2 | 4
(United States) Michael Sell | 6 | 6
(Australia) Grant Doyle | 4 | 2
WC | (France) Jean-Michel Pequery | 3 | 6^{5}
WC | (France) Pierre Bouteyre | 6 | 7^{7}
(Germany) Karsten Braasch | 1 | 4
19 | (Spain) Alberto Martín | 6 | 6

Second round
14 | (Denmark) Frederik Fetterlein | 3
(United States) Michael Sell | 3^{r}
WC | (France) Pierre Bouteyre | 4 | 6
19 | (Spain) Alberto Martín | 6 | 7

Qualifying competition
14 | (Denmark) Frederik Fetterlein | 3 | 7^{7} | 1
19 | (Spain) Alberto Martín | 6 | 6^{5} | 6

=== Fifteenth qualifier ===
First round
15 | (Spain) Fernando Vicente | 6 | 6
(Spain) David Caballero | 1 | 0
(Spain) Salvador Navarro | 6 | 7^{7}
(Venezuela) Jimy Szymanski | 3 | 6^{1}
(Netherlands) Rogier Wassen | 7 | 6^{1} | 6
(Sweden) Nicklas Timfjord | 5 | 7^{7} | 1
WC | (France) Guillaume Marx | 6^{8} | 6 | 6
18 | (Spain) Jacobo Diaz-Ruiz | 7^{10} | 2 | 4

Second round
15 | (Spain) Fernando Vicente | 6 | 3 | 1
(Spain) Salvador Navarro | 2 | 6 | 6
(Netherlands) Rogier Wassen | 6 | 5 | 6
WC | (France) Guillaume Marx | 2 | 7 | 0

Qualifying competition
(Spain) Salvador Navarro | 1 | 6 | 6
(Netherlands) Rogier Wassen | 6 | 4 | 2

=== Sixteenth qualifier ===
First round
16 | (Romania) Răzvan Sabău | 6 | 3 | 4
(France) Jérôme Hanquez | 2 | 6 | 6
(Czech Republic) Petr Luxa | 6 | 4 | 0
(Austria) Thomas Schiessling | 0 | 6 | 6
(Paraguay) Ramón Delgado | 6 | 6
(United Kingdom) Chris Wilkinson | 3 | 4
(South Africa) Robbie Koenig | 3 | 4
17 | (Russia) Andrey Cherkasov | 6 | 6

Second round
(France) Jérôme Hanquez | 6 | 6
(Austria) Thomas Schiessling | 4 | 2
(Paraguay) Ramón Delgado | 7 | 7^{7}
17 | (Russia) Andrey Cherkasov | 5 | 6^{5}

Qualifying competition
(France) Jérôme Hanquez | 6 | 2 | 1^{r}
(Paraguay) Ramón Delgado | 4 | 6 | 4
