= 2001 Open SEAT Godó – Doubles =

Doubles
- 2001 Open SEAT Godó
- 2000 Champions: (Sweden) Nicklas Kulti (Sweden) Mikael Tillström

Final
- Champions: (United States) Donald Johnson (United States) Jared Palmer
- Runners-up: (Spain) Tommy Robredo (Spain) Fernando Vicente
- Score: 7–6 (7–2), 6–4

Events
Singles	Doubles
← 2000 ·	Open SEAT Godó	· 2002 →

The doubles competition of the 2001 Open SEAT Godó tennis tournament was held in April 2001. Nicklas Kulti and Mikael Tillström were the defending champions but did not compete that year.

Donald Johnson and Jared Palmer won in the final 7–6 (7–2), 6–4 against Tommy Robredo and Fernando Vicente.

== Seeds ==
Champion seeds are indicated in bold text while text in italics indicates the round in which those seeds were eliminated. The top four seeded teams received byes into the second round.

1. (Australia) Wayne Arthurs / (Australia) Sandon Stolle (quarterfinals)
2. (United States) **Donald Johnson** / (United States) **Jared Palmer (champions)**
3. n/a
4. (Australia) Joshua Eagle / (Australia) Andrew Florent (semifinals)
5. (South Africa) David Adams / (Argentina) Martín García (first round)
6. (Australia) Michael Hill / (United States) Scott Humphries (quarterfinals)
7. (Argentina) Lucas Arnold / (Spain) Tomás Carbonell (first round)
8. (The Bahamas) Mark Knowles / (United States) Brian MacPhie (quarterfinals)

== Draw ==
=== Key ===
- Q = Qualifier
- WC = Wild card
- LL = Lucky loser
- Alt = Alternate
- ITF = ITF entry
- PR = Protected ranking
- SR = Special ranking
- SE = Special exempt
- JE = Junior exempt
- JR = Junior Accelerator Programme entrant
- CO = College Accelerator Programme entrant
- NG = Next Gen Accelerator Program entrant
- w/o = Walkover
- r = Retired
- d = Defaulted

=== Final ===
Final

WC
- (Spain) Tommy Robredo
- (Spain) Fernando Vicente
6^{2}
4

2
- (United States) **Donald Johnson**
- (United States) **Jared Palmer**
**7^{7}**
**6**

=== Top half ===
First round

Second round

Quarterfinals

Semifinals

1
- (Australia) **W Arthurs**
- (Australia) **S Stolle**
**6**
2
**6**

Q
- (Spain) **A Portas**
- (Spain) **G Puentes**
6^{5}
**7^{7}**
**6**

Q
- (Spain) A Portas
- (Spain) G Puentes
3
**6**
4

- (United States) J Stark
- (Zimbabwe) K Ullyett
**7^{7}**
6^{2}
3

1
- (Australia) W Arthurs
- (Australia) S Stolle
5
4

- (Spain) A Martín
- (Israel) E Ran
4
4

- (Australia) **A Kratzmann**
- (Belgium) **T Vanhoudt**
**7**
**6**

- (Australia) **A Kratzmann**
- (Belgium) **T Vanhoudt**
**6**
**6**

- (Australia) **A Kratzmann**
- (Belgium) **T Vanhoudt**
**6**
**6**

- (Czech Republic) **P Pála**
- (Czech Republic) **P Vízner**
**6**
**6**

- (Czech Republic) P Pála
- (Czech Republic) P Vízner
4
2

5
- (South Africa) D Adams
- (Argentina) M García
3
2

- (Australia) A Kratzmann
- (Belgium) T Vanhoudt
**6**
2
1

WC
- (Spain) **T Robredo**
- (Spain) **F Vicente**
3
**6**
**6**

LL
- (United States) D Bowen
- (Israel) J Erlich
**6**
6^{5}
4

- (Germany) M Kohlmann
- (United States) J Tarango
2
**6**
4

WC
- (Spain) **T Robredo**
- (Spain) **F Vicente**
3
**7^{7}**
**6**

WC
- (Spain) **T Robredo**
- (Spain) **F Vicente**
**6**
1
**6**

WC
- (Spain) **T Robredo**
- (Spain) **F Vicente**
**7^{7}**
**7^{7}**

WC
- (Spain) **S Navarro**
- (Spain) **Ó Serrano**
**6**
4
**6**

6
- (Australia) M Hill
- (United States) **S Humphries**
6^{3}
6^{4}

- (Czech Republic) T Cibulec
- (Czech Republic) L Friedl
1
**6**
4

WC
- (Spain) S Navarro
- (Spain) Ó Serrano
3
3

- (Argentina) P Albano
- (Spain) Á López Morón
1
4

6
- (Australia) **M Hill**
- (United States) **S Humphries**
**6**
**6**

6
- (Australia) **M Hill**
- (United States) **S Humphries**
**6**
**6**

=== Bottom half ===
First round

Second round

Quarterfinals

Semifinals

7
- (Argentina) L Arnold
- (Spain) T Carbonell
**7**
4
1

- (South Africa) **M Barnard**
- (Czech Republic) **C Suk**
5
**6**
**6**

- (South Africa) **M Barnard**
- (Czech Republic) **C Suk**
**6**
5
**6**

- (Argentina) D Orsanic
- (South Africa) J Weir-Smith
**7^{7}**
6^{2}
3

- (South Africa) R Koenig
- (South Africa) M Wakefield
4
**7**
2

- (South Africa) **R Koenig**
- (South Africa) **M Wakefield**
6^{4}
**7^{7}**
**6**

- (South Africa) M Barnard
- (Czech Republic) C Suk
**6**
3
6^{5}

- (Sweden) **S Aspelin**
- (Sweden) **J Landsberg**
**7^{7}**
**6**

4
- (Australia) **J Eagle**
- (Australia) **A Florent**
2
**6**
**7^{7}**

- (Croatia) I Ljubičić
- (Brazil) J Oncins
6^{5}
3

- (Sweden) S Aspelin
- (Sweden) J Landsberg
5
3

4
- (Australia) **J Eagle**
- (Australia) **A Florent**
**7**
**6**

4
- (Australia) J Eagle
- (Australia) A Florent
6^{3}
6^{2}

8
- (The Bahamas) **M Knowles**
- (United States) **B MacPhie**
**6**
**6**

2
- (United States) **D Johnson**
- (United States) **J Palmer**
**7^{7}**
**7^{7}**

WC
- (Spain) R Carretero
- (Spain) C Moyá
2
4

8
- (The Bahamas) **M Knowles**
- (United States) **B MacPhie**
**w/o**

WC
- (Sweden) **T Enqvist**
- (Sweden) **M Norman**
5
**6**
**6**

WC
- (Sweden) T Enqvist
- (Sweden) M Norman

- (Argentina) M Hood
- (Argentina) S Prieto
**7**
3
2

8
- (The Bahamas) M Knowles
- (United States) B MacPhie
5
4

- (South Africa) **J-L de Jager**
- (Germany) **M-K Goellner**
6^{5}
**6**
**7^{7}**

2
- (United States) **D Johnson**
- (United States) **J Palmer**
**7**
**6**

Q
- (Spain) F López
- (Spain) F Roig
**7^{7}**
3
6^{4}

- (South Africa) J-L de Jager
- (Germany) M-K Goellner
3
**6**
3

2
- (United States) **D Johnson**
- (United States) **J Palmer**
**6**
3
**6**
