= 2000 Torneo Godó – Doubles =

Doubles
- 2000 Torneo Godó

Final
- Champions: (Sweden) Nicklas Kulti (Sweden) Mikael Tillström
- Runners-up: (Netherlands) Paul Haarhuis (Australia) Sandon Stolle
- Score: 6–2, 6–7^{(2–7)}, 7–6^{(7–5)}

Events
Singles	Doubles
← 1999 ·	Torneo Godó	· 2001 →

Paul Haarhuis and Yevgeny Kafelnikov were the defending champions, but Kafelnikov chose to not compete this year in order to focus on the singles tournament.

Haarhuis teamed up with Sandon Stolle and ended the tournament as runners-up, being defeated by Nicklas Kulti and Mikael Tillström 6–2, 6–7^{(2–7)}, 7–6^{(7–5)} in the final.

== Seeds ==
The top four seeds received a bye into the second round.

1. (United States) Alex O'Brien / (United States) Jared Palmer (second round)
2. (Netherlands) Paul Haarhuis / (Australia) Sandon Stolle (final)
3. (South Africa) David Adams / (South Africa) John-Laffnie de Jager (second round)
4. (France) Olivier Delaître / (France) Fabrice Santoro (second round)
5. (South Africa) Piet Norval / (South Africa) Kevin Ullyett (first round)
6. (The Bahamas) Mark Knowles / (Belarus) Max Mirnyi (second round)
7. (Spain) Tomás Carbonell / (United States) Donald Johnson (second round)
8. (North Macedonia) Aleksandar Kitinov / (Russia) Andrei Olhovskiy (second round)

== Draw ==
=== Key ===
- Q = Qualifier
- WC = Wild card
- LL = Lucky loser
- Alt = Alternate
- ITF = ITF entry
- PR = Protected ranking
- SR = Special ranking
- SE = Special exempt
- JE = Junior exempt
- JR = Junior Accelerator Programme entrant
- CO = College Accelerator Programme entrant
- NG = Next Gen Accelerator Program entrant
- w/o = Walkover
- r = Retired
- d = Defaulted

=== Finals ===
Semifinals
(Brazil) Jaime Oncins (Argentina) Daniel Orsanic	2	1
(Sweden) Nicklas Kulti (Sweden) Mikael Tillström	6	6
(Sweden) Simon Aspelin (Sweden) Johan Landsberg	1	4
2	(Netherlands) Paul Haarhuis (Australia) Sandon Stolle	6	6

Final
(Sweden) Nicklas Kulti (Sweden) Mikael Tillström	6	6^{2}	7^{7}
2	(Netherlands) Paul Haarhuis (Australia) Sandon Stolle	2	7^{7}	6^{5}

=== Top half ===
First round
(Brazil) J Oncins (Argentina) D Orsanic	6	3	6
(United States) S Humphries (Federal Republic of Yugoslavia) N Zimonjić	2	6	3
(South Africa) M Barnard (South Africa) R Koenig	3	4
(Argentina) L Arnold Ker (Argentina) M García	6	6
(United States) D Bowen (Spain) A Portas	3	2
8	(North Macedonia) A Kitinov (Russia) A Olhovskiy	6	6
(Sweden) N Kulti (Sweden) M Tillström	6	6
WC	(Spain) J Burillo (Spain) F Vicente	2	4
(Spain) Á López Morón (Spain) J Velasco Jr.	6	7
WC	(Spain) S Navarro (Spain) T Robredo	4	5
(Italy) C Brandi (Italy) M Bertolini	6^{5}	2
6	(The Bahamas) M Knowles (Belarus) M Mirnyi	7^{7}	6

Second round
1	(United States) A O'Brien (United States) J Palmer	6	3	5
(Brazil) J Oncins (Argentina) D Orsanic	3	6	7
(Argentina) L Arnold Ker (Argentina) M García	6	7
8	(North Macedonia) A Kitinov (Russia) A Olhovskiy	2	5
4	(France) O Delaître (France) F Santoro	6^{2}	4
(Sweden) N Kulti (Sweden) M Tillström	7^{7}	6
(Spain) Á López Morón (Spain) J Velasco Jr.	7^{7}	7^{7}
6	(The Bahamas) M Knowles (Belarus) M Mirnyi	6^{5}	6^{2}

Quarterfinals
(Brazil) J Oncins (Argentina) D Orsanic	4	6	7^{7}
(Argentina) L Arnold Ker (Argentina) M García	6	1	6^{2}
(Sweden) N Kulti (Sweden) M Tillström	6	7^{7}
(Spain) Á López Morón (Spain) J Velasco Jr.	4	6^{4}

Semifinals
(Brazil) J Oncins (Argentina) D Orsanic	2	1
(Sweden) N Kulti (Sweden) M Tillström	6	6

=== Bottom half ===
First round
5	(South Africa) P Norval (Zimbabwe) K Ullyett	6^{1}	3
Q	(Spain) E Nicolás (Spain) G Puentes	7^{7}	6
(Australia) D Macpherson (Sweden) P Nyborg	6^{2}	6	6
(Argentina) P Albano (Argentina) G Etlis	7^{7}	2	4
WC	(Spain) A Berasategui (Spain) F Roig	4	7	4
(Sweden) S Aspelin (Sweden) J Landsberg	6	5	6
7	(Spain) T Carbonell (United States) D Johnson	6	6
WC	(Sweden) M Norman (United Kingdom) G Rusedski	4	2
(South Africa) C Haggard (Belgium) T Vanhoudt	7	5	7
(Slovakia) D Hrbatý (Czech Republic) C Suk	5	7	5
Q	(Spain) E Benfele Álvarez (Ecuador) N Lapentti	6	2	6
(Australia) J Eagle (Australia) A Florent	4	6	4

Second round
Q	(Spain) E Nicolás (Spain) G Puentes	7	6^{3}	6^{5}
(Australia) D Macpherson (Sweden) P Nyborg	5	7^{7}	7^{7}
(Sweden) S Aspelin (Sweden) J Landsberg	6	3	6
3	(South Africa) D Adams (South Africa) JL de Jager	2	6	3
7	(Spain) T Carbonell (United States) D Johnson	5	5
(South Africa) C Haggard (Belgium) T Vanhoudt	7	7
Q	(Spain) E Benfele Álvarez (Ecuador) N Lapentti	2	3
2	(Netherlands) P Haarhuis (Australia) S Stolle	6	6

Quarterfinals
(Australia) D Macpherson (Sweden) P Nyborg	6^{5}	3
(Sweden) S Aspelin (Sweden) J Landsberg	7^{7}	6
(South Africa) C Haggard (Belgium) T Vanhoudt	3	2
2	(Netherlands) P Haarhuis (Australia) S Stolle	6	6

Semifinals
(Sweden) S Aspelin (Sweden) J Landsberg	1	4
2	(Netherlands) P Haarhuis (Australia) S Stolle	6	6
