= 1998 Torneo Godó – Singles =

Singles
- 1998 Torneo Godó

Final
- Champion: (United States) Todd Martin
- Runner-up: (Spain) Alberto Berasategui
- Score: 6–2, 1–6, 6–3, 6–2

Details
- Draw: 56
- Seeds: 16

Events
Singles	Doubles
- Torneo Godó

The 1998 Torneo Godó was a men's tennis tournament played on Clay in Barcelona, Spain that was part of the International Series Gold of the 1998 ATP Tour. It was the 46th edition of the tournament and was held from 13–19 April 1998.

== Seeds ==
Champion seeds are indicated in bold text while text in italics indicates the round in which those seeds were eliminated.

1. (Russia) Yevgeny Kafelnikov (quarterfinals)
2. (Spain) Àlex Corretja (third round)
3. (Brazil) Gustavo Kuerten (second round)
4. (Slovakia) Karol Kučera (second round)
5. (Spain) Félix Mantilla (second round)
6. (Spain) Carlos Moyá (semifinals)
7. (Spain) Alberto Berasategui (final)
8. (Spain) Sergi Bruguera (quarterfinals)
9. (Spain) Albert Costa (third round)
10. (France) Fabrice Santoro (first round)
11. (Ukraine) Andriy Medvedev (first round)
12. (Austria) Thomas Muster (second round)
13. (Sweden) Magnus Larsson (first round)
14. (Sweden) Magnus Gustafsson (third round)
15. (South Africa) Wayne Ferreira (second round)
16. (Spain) Francisco Clavet (second round)

== Draw ==
Key

- Q = Qualifier
- WC = Wild card
- LL = Lucky loser
- Alt = Alternate
- ITF = ITF entry
- PR = Protected ranking
- SR = Special ranking
- SE = Special exempt
- JE = Junior exempt
- JR = Junior Accelerator Programme entrant
- CO = College Accelerator Programme entrant
- NG = Next Gen Accelerator Program entrant
- w/o = Walkover
- r = Retired
- d = Defaulted

=== Finals ===
Semifinals
7	**(Spain) Alberto Berasategui**	**7**	**6**
6	(Spain) Carlos Moyá	6	4
**(United States) Todd Martin**	**6**	**7**
(Italy) Andrea Gaudenzi	4	6

Final
7	(Spain) Alberto Berasategui	2	**6**	3	2
**(United States) Todd Martin**	**6**	1	**6**	**6**

=== Top half ===
==== Section 1 ====
First round
**(Spain) F Roig**	**6**	3	**6**
(Spain) J Alonso	1	**6**	4
**(Spain) J Muñoz**	**7**	**6**
(Netherlands) S Schalken	6	3
16	**(Spain) F Clavet**	**6**	**6**
(Spain) J Sánchez	3	4
9	**(Spain) A Costa**	4	**6**	**6**
(Ecuador) N Lapentti	**6**	3	1
**(Spain) G Blanco**	**6**	**6**
(Costa Rica) JA Marín	3	1
**(Brazil) F Meligeni**	**6**	**7**
(Spain) F Vicente	4	6

Second round
1	**(Russia) Y Kafelnikov**	**6**	4	**6**
(Spain) F Roig	4	**6**	4
**(Spain) J Muñoz**	**6**	**6**
16	(Spain) F Clavet	4	2
9	**(Spain) A Costa**	**6**	**6**
(Spain) G Blanco	3	4
(Brazil) F Meligeni	2	1
7	**(Spain) A Berasategui**	**6**	**6**

Third round
1	**(Russia) Y Kafelnikov**	**7**	3	**6**
(Spain) J Muñoz	6	**6**	1
9	(Spain) A Costa	4	4
7	**(Spain) A Berasategui**	**6**	**6**

Quarterfinals
1	(Russia) Y Kafelnikov	4	4
7	**(Spain) A Berasategui**	**6**	**6**

==== Section 2 ====
First round
**(Slovakia) D Hrbatý**	**6**	**6**
(Italy) D Sanguinetti	3	3
**(Morocco) K Alami**	6	**6**	**6**
(Romania) D Pescariu	**7**	3	4
14	**(Sweden) M Gustafsson**	**6**	**6**
(Germany) M-K Goellner	1	1
**(Spain) R Carretero-Diaz**	**7**	**7**
11	(Ukraine) A Medvedev	6	6
**(Czech Republic) B Ulihrach**	4	**7**	**7**
(Spain) JA Viloca	**6**	6	5
**(Spain) T Carbonell**	5	**6**	**6**
(Sweden) T Nydahl	**7**	3	3

Second round
4	(Slovakia) K Kučera	6	2
**(Slovakia) D Hrbatý**	**7**	**6**
(Morocco) K Alami	0	1
14	**(Sweden) M Gustafsson**	**6**	**6**
(Spain) R Carretero-Diaz	4	4
**(Czech Republic) B Ulihrach**	**6**	**6**
(Spain) T Carbonell	**6**	2	2
6	**(Spain) C Moyá**	3	**6**	**6**

Third round
**(Slovakia) D Hrbatý**	5	**6**	**6**
14	(Sweden) M Gustafsson	**7**	4	3
(Czech Republic) B Ulihrach	4	6
6	**(Spain) C Moyá**	**6**	**7**

Quarterfinals
(Slovakia) D Hrbatý	**6**	3	3
6	**(Spain) C Moyá**	4	**6**	**6**

=== Bottom half ===
==== Section 3 ====
First round
**(Czech Republic) C Doseděl**	**6**	1	**7**
(Spain) J Burillo	3	**6**	6
**(United States) T Martin**	**6**	**6**
(Australia) R Fromberg	2	4
12	**(Austria) T Muster**	**6**	2	**6**
(Uruguay) M Filippini	3	**6**	2
**(Russia) M Safin**	**6**	**6**
13	(Sweden) M Larsson	3	2
**(Czech Republic) J Novák**	**6**	**6**
(Spain) F López	0	2
**(Spain) C Costa**	**6**	**6**
(Argentina) D Hipperdinger	2	2

Second round
5	(Spain) F Mantilla	4	6
**(Czech Republic) C Doseděl**	**6**	**7**
**(United States) T Martin**	**6**	**7**
12	(Austria) T Muster	4	6
**(Russia) M Safin**	4	**6**	**7**
(Czech Republic) J Novák	**6**	3	6
**(Spain) C Costa**	**6**	**6**
3	(Brazil) G Kuerten	4	3

Third round
(Czech Republic) C Doseděl	3	5
**(United States) T Martin**	**6**	**7**
(Russia) M Safin	4	**6**	2
**(Spain) C Costa**	**6**	3	**6**

Quarterfinals
**(United States) T Martin**	**6**	**6**
(Spain) C Costa	2	4

==== Section 4 ====
First round
**(Spain) E Benfele Álvarez**	6	**6**	**6**
(Spain) A Portas	**7**	4	4
**(Belgium) F Dewulf**	**6**	**6**
(Morocco) H Arazi	4	4
**(United States) J Tarango**	**6**	**6**
10	(France) F Santoro	3	1
15	**(South Africa) W Ferreira**	**6**	**6**
(Spain) T Rascón	3	2
**(Italy) A Gaudenzi**	**6**	**6**
(Spain) D Sánchez	4	2
**(Spain) A Martín**	4	**7**	**6**
(Spain) S Navarro	**6**	5	2

Second round
(Spain) E Benfele Álvarez	5	0
8	**(Spain) S Bruguera**	**7**	**6**
**(Belgium) F Dewulf**	**6**	**7**
(United States) J Tarango	4	6
15	(South Africa) W Ferreira	**6**	1	2
**(Italy) A Gaudenzi**	4	**6**	**6**
(Spain) A Martín	1	0
2	**(Spain) À Corretja**	**6**	**6**

Third round
8	**(Spain) S Bruguera**	**6**	1	**7**
(Belgium) F Dewulf	3	**6**	5
**(Italy) A Gaudenzi**	3	**6**	**6**
2	(Spain) À Corretja	**6**	1	3

Quarterfinals
8	(Spain) S Bruguera	**6**	2	3
**(Italy) A Gaudenzi**	3	**6**	**6**
