= 1996 Panasonic German Open – Doubles =

Doubles
- 1996 Panasonic German Open

Final
- Champions: (The Bahamas) Mark Knowles (Canada) Daniel Nestor
- Runners-up: (France) Guy Forget (Switzerland) Jakob Hlasek
- Score: 6–2, 6–4

Details
- Draw: 28
- Seeds: 8

Events
Singles	Doubles
← 1995 ·	German Open Tennis Championships	· 1997 →

Wayne Ferreira and Yevgeny Kafelnikov were the defending champions but lost in the first round to David Rikl and Daniel Vacek.

Mark Knowles and Daniel Nestor won in the final 6–2, 6–4 against Guy Forget and Jakob Hlasek.

== Seeds ==
Champion seeds are indicated in bold text while text in italics indicates the round in which those seeds were eliminated. The top four seeded teams received byes into the second round.

1. (The Bahamas) **Mark Knowles** / (Canada) **Daniel Nestor (champions)**
2. (United States) Patrick Galbraith / (Russia) Andrei Olhovskiy (semifinals)
3. (South Africa) Ellis Ferreira / (Netherlands) Jan Siemerink (second round)
4. (France) Guy Forget / (Switzerland) Jakob Hlasek (final)
5. (Argentina) Luis Lobo / (Spain) Javier Sánchez (quarterfinals)
6. (Spain) Tomás Carbonell / (Spain) Francisco Roig (semifinals)
7. (Canada) Grant Connell / (South Africa) John-Laffnie de Jager (quarterfinals)
8. (South Africa) Wayne Ferreira / (Russia) Yevgeny Kafelnikov (first round)

== Draw ==
=== Key ===
- Q = Qualifier
- WC = Wild card
- LL = Lucky loser
- Alt = Alternate
- ITF = ITF entry
- PR = Protected ranking
- SR = Special ranking
- SE = Special exempt
- JE = Junior exempt
- JR = Junior Accelerator Programme entrant
- CO = College Accelerator Programme entrant
- NG = Next Gen Accelerator Program entrant
- w/o = Walkover
- r = Retired
- d = Defaulted

=== Final ===
Final

1
- (The Bahamas) **Mark Knowles**
- (Canada) **Daniel Nestor**
**6**
**6**

4
- (France) Guy Forget
- (Switzerland) Jakob Hlasek
2
4

=== Top half ===
First round

Second round

Quarterfinals

Semifinals

1
- (The Bahamas) **M Knowles**
- (Canada) **D Nestor**
**6**
**6**

- (Sweden) A Järryd
- (Czech Republic) C Suk
4
**6**
3

- (Croatia) G Ivanišević
- (Italy) D Nargiso
2
1

- (Croatia) **G Ivanišević**
- (Italy) **D Nargiso**
**6**
3
**6**

1
- (The Bahamas) **M Knowles**
- (Canada) **D Nestor**
6
**6**
**6**

WC
- (Germany) K Braasch
- (Germany) P Kühnen
4
2

7
- (Canada) G Connell
- (South Africa) J-L de Jager
**7**
3
2

- (Netherlands) **P Haarhuis**
- (Netherlands) **S Schalken**
**6**
**6**

- (Netherlands) P Haarhuis
- (Netherlands) S Schalken
5
6

- (Netherlands) T Kempers
- (United States) J Waite
3
2

7
- (Canada) **G Connell**
- (South Africa) **J-L de Jager**
**7**
**7**

7
- (Canada) **G Connell**
- (South Africa) **J-L de Jager**
**6**
**6**

1
- (The Bahamas) **M Knowles**
- (Canada) **D Nestor**
**7**
**7**

6
- (Spain) T Carbonell
- (Spain) F Roig
6
6

3
- (South Africa) E Ferreira
- (Netherlands) J Siemerink
4
4

- (United States) **T Kronemann**
- (Australia) **D Macpherson**
**6**
**7**

- (United States) **T Kronemann**
- (Australia) **D Macpherson**
**6**
**6**

WC
- (Netherlands) R Krajicek
- (United States) M Washington
1
5

- (United States) T Kronemann
- (Australia) D Macpherson
2
**6**
1

- (South Africa) L Bale
- (South Africa) M Barnard
**7**
3
2

6
- (Spain) **T Carbonell**
- (Spain) **F Roig**
**6**
2
**6**

- (Germany) **M-K Goellner**
- (Germany) **D Prinosil**
6
**6**
**6**

- (Germany) M-K Goellner
- (Germany) D Prinosil
6
6

Q
- (Germany) A Rădulescu
- (Germany) J Renzenbrink
6
4

6
- (Spain) **T Carbonell**
- (Spain) **F Roig**
**7**
**7**

6
- (Spain) **T Carbonell**
- (Spain) **F Roig**
**7**
**6**

=== Bottom half ===
First round

Second round

Quarterfinals

Semifinals

5
- (Argentina) **L Lobo**
- (Spain) **J Sánchez**
3
**7**
**6**

- (Australia) J Eagle
- (Australia) A Florent
**6**
6
4

5
- (Argentina) **L Lobo**
- (Spain) **J Sánchez**
**6**
**6**

WC
- (Germany) H Dreekmann
- (Germany) M Stich
**6**
4
4

- (Netherlands) T Nijssen
- (United States) G Van Emburgh
1
2

- (Netherlands) **T Nijssen**
- (United States) **G Van Emburgh**
4
**6**
**6**

5
- (Argentina) L Lobo
- (Spain) J Sánchez
4
6

- (Belgium) **L Pimek**
- (South Africa) **B Talbot**
**6**
**6**

4
- (France) **G Forget**
- (Switzerland) **J Hlasek**
**6**
**7**

Q
- (Spain) E Benfele Álvarez
- (Spain) D Salvador-Estepa
1
3

- (Belgium) L Pimek
- (South Africa) B Talbot
5
5

4
- (France) **G Forget**
- (Switzerland) **J Hlasek**
**7**
**7**

4
- (France) **G Forget**
- (Switzerland) **J Hlasek**
**6**
**6**

8
- (South Africa) W Ferreira
- (Russia) Y Kafelnikov
4
5

2
- (United States) P Galbraith
- (Russia) A Olhovskiy
2
1

- (Czech Republic) **D Rikl**
- (Czech Republic) **D Vacek**
**6**
**7**

- (Czech Republic) **D Rikl**
- (Czech Republic) **D Vacek**
**6**
**6**

- (Sweden) P Nyborg
- (Netherlands) M Oosting
**6**
6
3

WC
- (Germany) B Karbacher
- (Germany) A Thoms
2
4

WC
- (Germany) **B Karbacher**
- (Germany) **A Thoms**
3
**7**
**6**

- (Czech Republic) D Rikl
- (Czech Republic) D Vacek
5
1

- (South Africa) D Adams
- (Australia) W Arthurs
**6**
1
3

2
- (United States) **P Galbraith**
- (Russia) **A Olhovskiy**
**7**
**6**

- (United Kingdom) **N Broad**
- (South Africa) **P Norval**
4
**6**
**6**

- (United Kingdom) N Broad
- (United Kingdom) T Henman
2
**6**
4

2
- (United States) **P Galbraith**
- (Russia) **A Olhovskiy**
**6**
1
**6**

== Qualifying ==
=== Seeds ===
1. (Spain) Javier Conde / (Spain) Àlex Corretja (first round)
2. **(Germany) Alex Rădulescu / (Germany) Jörn Renzenbrink (qualified)**
3. **(Spain) Emilio Benfele Álvarez / (Spain) David Salvador-Estepa (qualified)**
4. (Costa Rica) Juan Antonio Marín / (Spain) Óscar Martínez (qualifying competition)

=== Qualifiers ===
1. **(Spain) Emilio Benfele Álvarez / (Spain) David Salvador-Estepa**
2. **(Germany) Alex Rădulescu / (Germany) Jörn Renzenbrink**

=== Qualifying draw ===
==== First qualifier ====
First round

Qualifying competition

1
(Spain) Javier Conde
(Spain) Àlex Corretja
6
3

WC
- (Germany) **Tommy Haas**
- (Italy) **Davide Sanguinetti**
**7**
**6**

WC
- (Germany) Tommy Haas
- (Italy) Davide Sanguinetti
**7**
3
5

(Germany) Lars Kirschner
(Germany) Alexander von Hugo
3
4

3
- (Spain) **Emilio Benfele Álvarez**
- (Spain) **David Salvador-Estepa**
5
**6**
**7**

3
- (Spain) **Emilio Benfele Álvarez**
- (Spain) **David Salvador-Estepa**
**6**
**6**

==== Second qualifier ====
First round

Qualifying competition

2
- (Germany) **Alex Rădulescu**
- (Germany) **Jörn Renzenbrink**
**6**
**6**

- (Russia) Andrei Merinov
- (Ukraine) Dimitri Poliakov
4
3

2
- (Germany) **Alex Rădulescu**
- (Germany) **Jörn Renzenbrink**
**7**
**6**

- (Croatia) Igor Šarić
- (Sweden) Mikael Stadling
5
**6**
4

4
- (Costa Rica) Juan Antonio Marín
- (Spain) Óscar Martínez
6
1

4
- (Costa Rica) **Juan Antonio Marín**
- (Spain) **Óscar Martínez**
**7**
2
**6**
