= 2001 Open SEAT Godó – Singles =

Singles
- 2001 Open SEAT Godó
- 2000 Champion: (Russia) Marat Safin

Final
- Champion: (Spain) Juan Carlos Ferrero
- Runner-up: (Spain) Carlos Moyá
- Score: 4–6, 7–5, 6–3, 3–6, 7–5

Details
- Draw: 56
- Seeds: 16

Events
Singles	Doubles
- Open SEAT Godó

The singles competition of the 2001 Open SEAT Godó tennis tournament was held in April 2001. Marat Safin was the defending champion but did not compete that year.

Juan Carlos Ferrero won in the final 4–6, 7–5, 6–3, 3–6, 7–5 against Carlos Moyá.

== Seeds ==
A champion seed is indicated in bold text and the round in which that seed was eliminated is indicated in italic text. The top eight seeds received a bye to the second round.

1. n/a
2. (Sweden) Magnus Norman (second round)
3. (Spain) **Juan Carlos Ferrero (champion)**
4. (Spain) Àlex Corretja (quarterfinals)
5. (France) Arnaud Clément (third round)
6. (Slovakia) Dominik Hrbatý (second round)
7. (Sweden) Thomas Enqvist (semifinals)
8. (France) Sébastien Grosjean (second round)
9. (Argentina) Franco Squillari (first round)
10. (France) Cédric Pioline (first round)
11. (Spain) Carlos Moyá (final)
12. (Argentina) Gastón Gaudio (first round)
13. (Belarus) Vladimir Voltchkov (first round)
14. (France) Nicolas Escudé (second round)
15. (Spain) Francisco Clavet (first round)
16. (Spain) Albert Costa (third round)

== Draw ==
Key

- Q = Qualifier
- WC = Wild card
- LL = Lucky loser
- Alt = Alternate
- ITF = ITF entry
- PR = Protected ranking
- SR = Special ranking
- SE = Special exempt
- JE = Junior exempt
- JR = Junior Accelerator Programme entrant
- CO = College Accelerator Programme entrant
- NG = Next Gen Accelerator Program entrant
- w/o = Walkover
- r = Retired
- d = Defaulted

=== Finals ===
Semifinals
WC/7	(Sweden) Thomas Enqvist	3	3
11	(Spain) **Carlos Moyá**	**6**	**6**
3	(Spain) **Juan Carlos Ferrero**	**7**	**6**
(Switzerland) Michel Kratochvil	5	2

Final
11	(Spain) Carlos Moyá	**6**	5	3	**6**	5
3	(Spain) **Juan Carlos Ferrero**	4	**7**	**6**	3	**7**

=== Top half ===
==== Section 1 ====
First round
Q	(Italy) **F Luzzi**	**6**	**6**
(Argentina) J Acasuso	0	3
(Spain) **Á Calatrava**	2	**7**	**6**
WC	(Spain) A Berasategui	**6**	5	3
(Morocco) Y El Aynaoui	4	**7^{7}**	4
14	(France) **N Escudé**	**6**	6^{1}	**6**
10	(France) C Pioline	**6**	4	6^{4}
(Ukraine) **A Medvedev**	2	**6**	**7^{7}**
(Spain) **G Puentes**	**7**	**6**
(Spain) F Vicente	5	3
(Italy) **D Sanguinetti**	3	**6**	**6**
(Chile) F González	**6**	3	0

Second round
LL	(Germany) C Vinck	4	6^{4}
Q	(Italy) **F Luzzi**	**6**	**7^{7}**
(Spain) **Á Calatrava**	**6**	**7^{7}**
14	(France) N Escudé	3	6^{4}
(Ukraine) **A Medvedev**	**6**	**6**
(Spain) G Puentes	4	3
(Italy) D Sanguinetti	3	0
WC/7	(Sweden) **T Enqvist**	**6**	**6**

Third round
Q	(Italy) **F Luzzi**	**7^{7}**	3	**6**
(Spain) Á Calatrava	6^{5}	**6**	3
(Ukraine) A Medvedev	6^{6}	5
WC/7	(Sweden) **T Enqvist**	**7^{8}**	**7**

Quarterfinals
Q	(Italy) F Luzzi	1	4
WC/7	(Sweden) **T Enqvist**	**6**	**6**

==== Section 2 ====
First round
(Australia) W Arthurs	4	**7^{7}**	6^{10}
Q	(Germany) **O Gross**	**6**	6^{3}	**7^{12}**
Q	(Argentina) M Charpentier	**7**	4	6^{9}
(Chile) **N Massú**	5	**6**	**7^{11}**
(Russia) **M Youzhny**	**6**	**6**
15	(Spain) F Clavet	2	4
11	(Spain) **C Moyá**	**6**	6^{5}	**6**
(Argentina) M Zabaleta	4	**7^{7}**	3
(Slovakia) **K Kučera**	**6**	**6**
WC	(Germany) N Kiefer	2	4
(Spain) **J Balcells**	**6**	**6**
(France) A Di Pasquale	2	2

Second round
4	(Spain) **À Corretja**	**6**	6^{6}	**3**
Q	(Germany) O Gross	3	**7^{8}**	1/r
(Chile) **N Massú**	**6**	6^{5}	**6**
(Russia) M Youzhny	1	**7^{7}**	4
11	(Spain) **C Moyá**	**7**	**6**
(Slovakia) K Kučera	5	0
(Spain) J Balcells	6^{5}	6^{8}
5	(France) **A Clément**	**7^{7}**	**7^{10}**

Third round
4	(Spain) **À Corretja**	**6**	**6**
(Chile) N Massú	4	3
11	(Spain) **C Moyá**	**7**	**6**
5	(France) A Clément	5	2

Quarterfinals
4	(Spain) À Corretja	3	1
11	(Spain) **C Moyá**	**6**	**6**

=== Bottom half ===
==== Section 3 ====
First round
Q	(Argentina) G Cañas	6^{7}	2
(Spain) **S Bruguera**	**7^{9}**	**6**
(Spain) A Martín	5	3
WC	(Spain) **F Mantilla**	**7**	**6**
(Argentina) **A Calleri**	**6**	**6**
9	(Argentina) F Squillari	2	3
16	(Spain) **A Costa**	**6**	5	**6**
(Czech Republic) C Doseděl	4	**7**	4
Q	(Spain) **A Montañés**	3	**6**	**6**
Q	(Croatia) G Ivanišević	**6**	4	2
LL	(Russia) N Davydenko	4	1
Q	(Romania) **A Voinea**	**6**	**6**

Second round
6	(Slovakia) D Hrbatý	0	2
(Spain) **S Bruguera**	**6**	**6**
WC	(Spain) **F Mantilla**	**6**	1	**6**
(Argentina) A Calleri	1	**6**	4
16	(Spain) **A Costa**	**6**	4	**7^{7}**
Q	(Spain) A Montañés	4	**6**	6^{5}
Q	(Romania) A Voinea	6^{6}	**7^{7}**	5
3	(Spain) **J C Ferrero**	**7^{8}**	6^{5}	**7**

Third round
(Spain) S Bruguera	4	2
WC	(Spain) **F Mantilla**	**6**	**6**
16	(Spain) A Costa	4	**6**	3
3	(Spain) **J C Ferrero**	**6**	3	**6**

Quarterfinals
WC	(Spain) F Mantilla	**6**	4	1
3	(Spain) **J C Ferrero**	1	**6**	**6**

==== Section 4 ====
First round
(Belarus) M Mirnyi	2	6^{4}
(Spain) **T Robredo**	**6**	**7^{7}**
(Argentina) **G Coria**	6^{4}	**6**	**7**
WC	(Spain) F López	**7^{7}**	4	5
(Switzerland) **M Kratochvil**	**6**	**6**
12	(Argentina) G Gaudio	0	3
13	(Belarus) V Voltchkov	1	2
(Spain) **G Blanco**	**6**	**6**
(Croatia) I Ljubičić	**7**	6^{3}	3
(Switzerland) **M Rosset**	5	**7^{7}**	**6**
(Spain) **A Portas**	3	**6**	**7**
(Morocco) H Arazi	**6**	4	5

Second round
8	(France) S Grosjean	2	2
(Spain) **T Robredo**	**6**	**6**
(Argentina) G Coria	6^{5}	**7**	6^{3}
(Switzerland) **M Kratochvil**	**7^{7}**	5	**7^{7}**
(Spain) **G Blanco**	**7^{9}**	**6**
(Switzerland) M Rosset	6^{7}	4
(Spain) **A Portas**	**1**
2	(Sweden) M Norman	1	r

Third round
(Spain) T Robredo	1	0
(Switzerland) **M Kratochvil**	**6**	**6**
(Spain) G Blanco	4	2
(Spain) **A Portas**	**6**	**6**

Quarterfinals
(Switzerland) **M Kratochvil**	**6**	2	**6**
(Spain) A Portas	3	**6**	1
