= Julien Chauvin (tennis) =

French tennis player

- Country (sports): France
- Born: 17 April 1975 (age 50)
- Prize money: $22,562

Singles
- Career record: 0–1
- Highest ranking: No. 184 (14 Jul 1997)

Grand Slam singles results
- French Open: Q3 (1997)

Doubles
- Highest ranking: No. 592 (2 Dec 1996)

Julien Chauvin (born 17 April 1975) is a French former professional tennis player.

Chauvin played collegiate tennis for the University of Mobile in Alabama, then competed on the professional tour during the late 1990s, reaching a best singles world ranking of 184. He made the third and final qualifying round for the 1997 French Open, with wins over Mark Knowles and Joan Balcells (retired hurt). His only ATP Tour main draw appearance came at the 1997 Marbella Open, where he lost in the first round to seventh seed Julián Alonso.
