= 1998 Torneo Godó – Doubles =

Doubles
- 1998 Torneo Godó

Final
- Champions: (Netherlands) Jacco Eltingh (Netherlands) Paul Haarhuis
- Runners-up: (South Africa) Ellis Ferreira (United States) Rick Leach
- Score: 7–5, 6–0

Details
- Draw: 28
- Seeds: 8

Events
Singles	Doubles
- Torneo Godó

The 1998 Torneo Godó was a men's tennis tournament played on Clay in Barcelona, Spain that was part of the International Series Gold of the 1998 ATP Tour. It was the 46th edition of the tournament and was held from 13–19 April 1998.

== Seeds ==
Champion seeds are indicated in bold text while text in italics indicates the round in which those seeds were eliminated.

1. (Netherlands) **Jacco Eltingh** / (Netherlands) **Paul Haarhuis (champions)**
2. (South Africa) Ellis Ferreira / (United States) Rick Leach (final)
3. (United States) Jim Grabb / (Czech Republic) Cyril Suk (semifinals)
4. (United States) Donald Johnson / (United States) Francisco Montana (quarterfinals)
5. (Argentina) Luis Lobo / (Spain) Javier Sánchez (semifinals)
6. (United Kingdom) Neil Broad / (South Africa) Piet Norval (quarterfinals)
7. (South Africa) David Adams / (Argentina) Daniel Orsanic (quarterfinals)
8. (South Africa) Wayne Ferreira / (Russia) Yevgeny Kafelnikov (quarterfinals)

== Draw ==
Key

- Q = Qualifier
- WC = Wild card
- LL = Lucky loser
- Alt = Alternate
- ITF = ITF entry
- PR = Protected ranking
- SR = Special ranking
- SE = Special exempt
- JE = Junior exempt
- JR = Junior Accelerator Programme entrant
- CO = College Accelerator Programme entrant
- NG = Next Gen Accelerator Program entrant
- w/o = Walkover
- r = Retired
- d = Defaulted

=== Finals ===
Semifinals
1	(Netherlands) **Jacco Eltingh** **(Netherlands) Paul Haarhuis**	3	**6**	**6**
3	(United States) Jim Grabb (Czech Republic) Cyril Suk	**6**	3	3
5	(Argentina) Luis Lobo (Spain) Javier Sánchez	2	5
2	(South Africa) **Ellis Ferreira** **(United States) Rick Leach**	**6**	**7**

Final
1	(Netherlands) **Jacco Eltingh** **(Netherlands) Paul Haarhuis**	**7**	**6**
2	(South Africa) Ellis Ferreira (United States) Rick Leach	5	0

=== Top half ===
First round
(Netherlands) **T Kempers** **(Netherlands) M Oosting**	**7**	**6**
(Spain) C Moyá (Spain) F Vicente	6	4
(United States) **T Kronemann** **(Australia) D Macpherson**	**7**	4	**6**
(Australia) W Arthurs (Australia) A Kratzmann	6	**6**	3
8	(South Africa) **W Ferreira** **(Russia) Y Kafelnikov**	**6**	1	**6**
(Spain) J Alonso (Spain) F Mantilla	4	**6**	2
(Italy) **C Brandi** **(France) F Santoro**	4	**7**	**6**
(Belgium) L Pimek (South Africa) B Talbot	**6**	6	2
(Czech Republic) **C Doseděl** **(Romania) D Pescariu**	6	**7**	**6**
(Brazil) G Kuerten (Brazil) F Meligeni	**7**	6	3
6	(United Kingdom) **N Broad** **(South Africa) P Norval**	0	**6**	**7**
(United States) D Randall (United States) J Waite	**6**	3	6

Second round
(Netherlands) T Kempers (Netherlands) M Oosting	1	4
1	(Netherlands) **J Eltingh** **(Netherlands) P Haarhuis**	**6**	**6**
(United States) T Kronemann (Australia) D Macpherson	2	2
8	(South Africa) **W Ferreira** **(Russia) Y Kafelnikov**	**6**	**6**
(Italy) C Brandi (France) F Santoro	3	**7**	**6**
3	(United States) **J Grabb** **(Czech Republic) C Suk**	**6**	5	**6**
(Czech Republic) C Doseděl (Romania) D Pescariu	4	3
6	(United Kingdom) **N Broad** **(South Africa) P Norval**	**6**	**6**

Quarterfinals
1	(Netherlands) **J Eltingh** **(Netherlands) P Haarhuis**	**6**	**6**
8	(South Africa) W Ferreira (Russia) Y Kafelnikov	4	3
3	(United States) **J Grabb** **(Czech Republic) C Suk**	**6**	6	**6**
6	(United Kingdom) N Broad (South Africa) P Norval	3	**7**	3

Semifinals
1	(Netherlands) **J Eltingh** **(Netherlands) P Haarhuis**	3	**6**	**6**
3	(United States) J Grabb (Czech Republic) C Suk	**6**	3	3

=== Bottom half ===
First round
5	(Argentina) **L Lobo** **(Spain) J Sánchez**	**6**	4	**6**
(North Macedonia) A Kitinov (Belgium) T Vanhoudt	1	**6**	3
(Spain) **T Carbonell** **(Spain) F Roig**	**7**	4	**7**
(Argentina) P Albano (Spain) À Corretja	5	**6**	6
(Germany) **M-K Goellner** **(Russia) A Olhovskiy**	**6**	**6**
(Australia) R Fromberg (Sweden) T Nydahl	4	4
7	(South Africa) **D Adams** **(Argentina) D Orsanic**	**6**	**6**
(Spain) G Blanco (Spain) S Navarro	3	0
(Spain) **A Berasategui** **(Spain) J Burillo**	6	**6**	**6**
(Czech Republic) J Novák (Czech Republic) P Vízner	**7**	2	4
(Mexico) **D Roditi** **(Netherlands) F Wibier**	**6**	**7**
(United States) B Coupe (United States) J Tarango	4	5

Second round
5	(Argentina) **L Lobo** **(Spain) J Sánchez**	**6**	**6**
(Spain) T Carbonell (Spain) F Roig	2	2
(Germany) M-K Goellner (Russia) A Olhovskiy	6	3
4	(United States) **D Johnson** **(United States) F Montana**	**7**	**6**
7	(South Africa) **D Adams** **(Argentina) D Orsanic**	**6**	**6**
(Spain) A Berasategui (Spain) J Burillo	3	2
(Mexico) D Roditi (Netherlands) F Wibier	6	6
2	(South Africa) **E Ferreira** **(United States) R Leach**	**7**	**7**

Quarterfinals
5	(Argentina) **L Lobo** **(Spain) J Sánchez**	**6**	**6**
4	(United States) D Johnson (United States) F Montana	2	4
7	(South Africa) D Adams (Argentina) D Orsanic	1	4
2	(South Africa) **E Ferreira** **(United States) R Leach**	**6**	**6**

Semifinals
5	(Argentina) L Lobo (Spain) J Sánchez	2	5
2	(South Africa) **E Ferreira** **(United States) R Leach**	**6**	**7**
