= 1999 Torneo Godó =

Tennis tournament

- Date: 12–18 April
- Edition: 47th
- Category: ATP Championship Series
- Draw: 56S / 28D
- Prize money: $825,000
- Surface: Clay / outdoor
- Location: Barcelona, Spain

Champions

Singles
- (Spain) Félix Mantilla

Doubles
- (Netherlands) Paul Haarhuis / (Russia) Yevgeny Kafelnikov
| ← 1998 · | Torneo Godó | · 2000 → |

The 1999 Torneo Godó was a men's tennis tournament played on Clay in Barcelona, Catalonia, Spain that was part of the Championship Series of the 1999 ATP Tour. It was the 47th edition of the tournament and was held from 12 April until 18 April 1999. Tenth-seeded Félix Mantilla won the singles title.

This event also carried the joint denominations of the Campeonatos Internacionales de España or Spanish International Championships that was hosted at this venue and location, and was 32nd edition to be held in Barcelona, and the Open Seat Godó' and is the 4th edition branded under that name.

== Finals ==
=== Singles ===
(Spain) Félix Mantilla defeated (Morocco) Karim Alami, 7–6^{(7–2)}, 6–3, 6–3

- It was Mantilla's 1st title of the year and the 8th of his career.

=== Doubles ===
(Netherlands) Paul Haarhuis / (Russia) Yevgeny Kafelnikov defeated (Italy) Massimo Bertolini / (Italy) Cristian Brandi, 7–5, 6–3
