= Miguel Pastura =

Argentine tennis player

- Country (sports): Argentina
- Born: 27 May 1973 (age 52)
- Plays: Right-handed
- Prize money: $73,220

Singles
- Career record: 0-1
- Highest ranking: No. 182 (16 October 1995)

Grand Slam singles results
- French Open: 1R (1997)

Doubles
- Highest ranking: No. 336 (14 September 1998)

Miguel Pastura (born 27 May 1973) is a tennis coach and a former professional player from Argentina. He is currently coaching Thiago Agustín Tirante.

== Professional Career ==
Pastura was a doubles runner-up, with Marcelo Charpentier, at the Eisenach Challenger tournament in 1994. He never played a doubles match on the ATP Tour but reached a ranking of No. 336.

The Argentine played South African right-hander Marcos Ondruska in the first round of the 1997 French Open, losing in straight sets.

== Coaching career ==
He coached Román Andrés Burruchaga. He is coaching another compatriot, Thiago Agustín Tirante since 2023.
