= Wolfgang Schranz =

Austrian tennis player

- Country (sports): Austria
- Residence: Vienna
- Born: 18 or 19 March 1976; Zell am See, Austria
- Height: 1.78 m (5 ft 10 in)
- Turned pro: 1994
- Plays: Right-handed
- Prize money: $168,313

Singles
- Career record: 8-15
- Career titles: 0
- Highest ranking: No. 136 (9 Nov 1998)

Grand Slam singles results
- French Open: 1R (1997, 1998)

Doubles
- Career record: 4-7
- Career titles: 0
- Highest ranking: No. 376 (30 Jul 2001)

Wolfgang Schranz (born 18 or 19 March 1976) is a former professional tennis player from Austria.

Schranz won the 1992 Austrian National Championships, for the 16 and under age group.

He competed in main draw of the French Open twice, in 1997 and 1998. In the first tournament he lost in the opening round to Gastón Etlis and he again failed to make the second round in 1998, when he was beaten by Felix Mantilla.

His best results on tour came at events in his home country. In 1994 he made the quarter-finals of the St. Pölten tournament. Schranz had a win over world number 40 Franco Squillari in the 1999 Austrian Open, where he made the round of 16. At the same event two years later he was a quarter-finalist in the doubles, partnering Thomas Strengberger.

The Austrian also played Davis Cup tennis for his country. He represented Austria in their World Group fixture against South Africa in 1996 and appeared in three further ties during his career. Schranz finished with a 3/3 record, 2/1 in singles and 1/2 as a doubles player.

== Challenger titles ==
=== Singles: (1) ===
No.	Year	Tournament	Surface	Opponent	Score
1.	1998	Oberstaufen, Germany	Clay	(Netherlands) Rogier Wassen	6–4, 6–2
