= Quino Muñoz =

Spanish tennis player (born 1975)

- Full name: Joaquín Muñoz Hernández
- Country (sports): Spain
- Born: 4 January 1975 (age 50); Madrid, Spain
- Height: 5 ft 10 in (178 cm)
- Retired: 2018
- Plays: Right-handed
- Prize money: $141,249

Singles
- Career record: 4–4
- Highest ranking: No. 157 (27 April 1998)

Doubles
- Career record: 0–2
- Highest ranking: No. 325 (28 August 1995)

Joaquín "Quino" Muñoz Hernández (born 4 January 1975) is a former professional tennis player from Spain.

== Biography ==
A right-handed player from Madrid, Muñoz began competing on the professional circuit in 1994. The highest singles ranking that he achieved was 157 in the world.

His best performance on the ATP Tour came at the 1998 Torneo Godó in Barcelona, where he registered wins over Sjeng Schalken and Francisco Clavet, before he was eliminated in the round of 16 by the top seeded Yevgeny Kafelnikov in three sets. He held a set point in the first set, which he lost to Kafelnikov in a tiebreak, then claimed the second set, but the Russian won the deciding set.

While in his 30s he continued to make the occasional appearances in local tournaments and in 2016 was runner-up in doubles at the Segovia Challenger, at the age of 41. He announced his retirement from competitive tennis in 2018.
