= 2000 Torneo Godó – Singles =

Singles
- 2000 Torneo Godó

Final
- Champion: (Russia) Marat Safin
- Runner-up: (Spain) Juan Carlos Ferrero
- Score: 6–3, 6–3, 6–4

Details
- Draw: 56
- Seeds: 16

Events
Singles	Doubles
- Torneo Godó

Marat Safin defeated Juan Carlos Ferrero in the final, 6–3, 6–3, 6–4 to win the singles tennis title at the 2000 Barcelona Open.

Félix Mantilla was the defending champion, but lost in the second round to Nicolás Lapentti.

In the first round, wildcard entrant Sergi Bruguera defeated future world No. 1 Roger Federer 6–1, 6–1. This was Federer's worst loss, by number of games won, in his entire career.

== Seeds ==
A champion seed is indicated in bold text while text in italics indicates the round in which that seed was eliminated. The top eight seeds received a bye to the second round.

1. (Russia) Yevgeny Kafelnikov (second round)
2. (Sweden) Magnus Norman (semifinals)
3. (Ecuador) Nicolás Lapentti (quarterfinals)
4. (Chile) Marcelo Ríos (quarterfinals)
5. (France) ~~Cédric Pioline~~ (withdrew)
6. (Spain) Àlex Corretja (second round)
7. (United Kingdom) Greg Rusedski (third round)
8. (Morocco) Younes El Aynaoui (quarterfinals)
9. (Germany) Tommy Haas (quarterfinals)
10. (Spain) Albert Costa (first round)
11. (France) Nicolas Escudé (first round)
12. (Argentina) Mariano Zabaleta (first round)
13. (Slovakia) Dominik Hrbatý (third round)
14. (France) Sébastien Grosjean (first round)
15. (Morocco) Hicham Arazi (second round)
16. (Brazil) Fernando Meligeni (second round)

== Draw ==
Key

- Q = Qualifier
- WC = Wild card
- LL = Lucky loser
- Alt = Alternate
- ITF = ITF entry
- PR = Protected ranking
- SR = Special ranking
- SE = Special exempt
- JE = Junior exempt
- JR = Junior Accelerator Programme entrant
- CO = College Accelerator Programme entrant
- NG = Next Gen Accelerator Program entrant
- w/o = Walkover
- r = Retired
- d = Defaulted

Qualifying Draw

=== Finals ===
Semifinals
(Spain) Carlos Moyá	4	**7**	2
(Spain) **Juan Carlos Ferrero**	**6**	6^{5}	**6**
(Russia) **Marat Safin**	2	**7**	**6**
2	(Sweden) Magnus Norman	**6**	6^{4}	3

Final
(Spain) Juan Carlos Ferrero	3	3	4
(Russia) **Marat Safin**	**6**	**6**	**6**

=== Top half ===
==== Section 1 ====
First round
(Spain) **C Moyá**	**6**	4	**6**
(France) A Clement	4	**6**	4
Q	(Czech Republic) B Ulihrach	3	**7**	3
(Switzerland) **M Rosset**	**6**	6^{6}	**6**
(Australia) R Fromberg	3	4
15	(Morocco) **H Arazi**	**6**	**6**
9	(Germany) **T Haas**	**7**	4	**6**
Q	(Argentina) G Etlis	5	**6**	4
Q	(Spain) A Portas	6^{7}	3
WC	(Costa Rica) **J Marín**	**7**	**6**
(Belarus) M Mirnyi	3	**7**	2
(Morocco) **K Alami**	**6**	6^{5}	**6**

Second round
1	(Russia) Y Kafelnikov	2	6^{4}
(Spain) **C Moyá**	**6**	**7**
(Switzerland) **M Rosset**	4	**6**	**6**
15	(Morocco) H Arazi	**6**	4	4
9	(Germany) **T Haas**	**6**	**7**
WC	(Costa Rica) J Marín	3	5
(Morocco) K Alami	3	**6**	2
7	(United Kingdom) **G Rusedski**	**6**	3	**6**

Third round
(Spain) **C Moyá**	**7**	**7**
(Switzerland) M Rosset	6^{4}	6^{2}
9	(Germany) **T Haas**	**7**	**6**
7	(United Kingdom) G Rusedski	6^{6}	3

Quarterfinals
(Spain) **C Moyá**	**6**	**6**
9	(Germany) T Haas	4	4

==== Section 2 ====
First round
(Argentina) F Squillari	3	**6**	3
(Romania) **A Pavel**	**6**	3	**6**
(United States) V Spadea	4	2
(Sweden) **A Vinciguerra**	**6**	**6**
Q	(Spain) **S Navarro**	**6**	**6**
14	(France) S Grosjean	3	4
11	(France) N Escudé	4	5
(Spain) **J Ferrero**	**6**	**7**
(Argentina) H Gumy	**6**	6^{5}	2
(Spain) **F Vicente**	2	**7**	**6**
WC	(Spain) G Blanco	**6**	3	3
(France) **F Santoro**	4	**6**	**6**

Second round
4	(Chile) **M Ríos**	**6**	4	**7**
(Romania) A Pavel	3	**6**	6^{1}
(Sweden) **A Vinciguerra**	**6**	**7**
Q	(Spain) S Navarro	4	6^{6}
(Spain) **J Ferrero**	**7**	**7**
(Spain) F Vicente	6^{3}	2
(France) **F Santoro**	**6**	**6**
LL	(Spain) G Puentes	2	4

Third round
4	(Chile) **M Ríos**	**7**	**7**
(Sweden) A Vinciguerra	6^{3}	5
(Spain) **J Ferrero**	**6**	4	**6**
(France) F Santoro	3	**6**	0

Quarterfinals
4	(Chile) M Ríos	3	4
(Spain) **J Ferrero**	**6**	**6**

=== Bottom half ===
==== Section 3 ====
First round
(Argentina) **G Gaudio**	**6**	**6**
(France) A Di Pasquale	1	3
(Argentina) **M Puerta**	**7**	**7**
WC	(Spain) J Alonso	5	6^{3}
(Russia) **M Safin**	**6**	**6**
12	(Argentina) M Zabaleta	4	4
13	(Slovakia) **D Hrbatý**	**7**	4	**7**
Q	(Sweden) N Kulti	6^{1}	**6**	5
(Spain) **A Berasategui**	**6**	**6**
Q	(Spain) T Robredo	1	1
(Spain) **F Mantilla**	**6**	**6**
(Netherlands) S Schalken	1	3

Second round
6	(Spain) À Corretja	**6**	3	3
(Argentina) **G Gaudio**	0	**6**	**6**
(Argentina) M Puerta	**7**	6^{1}	4
(Russia) **M Safin**	6^{2}	**7**	**6**
13	(Slovakia) **D Hrbatý**	**7**	**7**
(Spain) A Berasategui	5	5
(Spain) F Mantilla	3	0
3	(Ecuador) **N Lapentti**	**6**	**6**

Third round
(Argentina) G Gaudio	4	**6**	4
(Russia) **M Safin**	**6**	4	**6**
13	(Slovakia) D Hrbatý	2	2
3	(Ecuador) **N Lapentti**	**6**	**6**

Quarterfinals
(Russia) **M Safin**	**7**	**6**
3	(Ecuador) N Lapentti	6^{3}	5

==== Section 4 ====
First round
(Spain) **F Clavet**	**7**	**6**
(Spain) A Martín	6^{3}	3
WC	(Spain) **S Bruguera**	**6**	**6**
(Switzerland) R Federer	1	1
(Armenia) **S Sargsian**	**7**	**6**
10	(Spain) A Costa	6^{2}	4
16	(Brazil) **F Meligeni**	**6**	**6**
Q	(Belgium) C Rochus	4	3
(Netherlands) **R Krajicek**	**7**	**6**
(Sweden) M Tillström	5	1
(Germany) **R Schüttler**	**6**	3
(Argentina) G Cañas	1	0	r

Second round
8	(Morocco) **Y El Aynaoui**	**7**	**7**
(Spain) F Clavet	5	6^{6}
WC	(Spain) **S Bruguera**	**6**	**6**
(Armenia) S Sargsian	3	3
16	(Brazil) F Meligeni	5	1
(Netherlands) **R Krajicek**	**7**	**6**
(Germany) R Schüttler	6^{2}	3
2	(Sweden) **M Norman**	**7**	**6**

Third round
8	(Morocco) **Y El Aynaoui**	**6**	**6**
WC	(Spain) S Bruguera	3	4
(Netherlands) R Krajicek	6^{2}	4
2	(Sweden) **M Norman**	**7**	**6**

Quarterfinals
8	(Morocco) Y El Aynaoui	2	4
2	(Sweden) **M Norman**	**6**	**6**
