= József Krocskó =

Hungarian tennis player

- Country (sports): Hungary
- Residence: Budapest, Hungary
- Born: 20 April 1968 (age 57); Uzhhorod, Ukraine, Soviet Union
- Height: 1.80 m (5 ft 11 in)
- Plays: Right-handed
- Prize money: $146,884

Singles
- Career record: 12–20
- Career titles: 0; 0 Challenger, 0 Futures
- Highest ranking: No. 129 (23 June 1997)

Grand Slam singles results
- Australian Open: Q1 (1999)
- French Open: 2R (1997)
- Wimbledon: Q1 (1994)

Doubles
- Career record: 0–0
- Career titles: 0; 0 Challenger, 0 Futures
- Highest ranking: No. 390 (28 September 1987)

Team competitions
- Davis Cup: 9–11
- Last updated on: 20 May 2023.

József Krocskó (Hungarian: [ˈjoːʒɛf ˈkrot͡ʃkoː]; born 20 April 1968) is a former professional tennis player from Hungary.

Krocskó, who was born in the Ukrainian SSR, won the Hungarian Tennis Championships in 1992 and 1993.

He qualified for his first Grand Slam in 1993, at the French Open, where he was defeated in the opening round by Carlos Costa. His only other Grand Slam appearance was the 1997 French Open. In that tournament, which he entered as a lucky loser, he beat Jan Kroslak in the first round, then lost to Stéphane Simian.

Krocskó took part in 20 Davis Cup singles rubbers for his country, winning nine of them. In 1993 he helped Hungary qualify for the World Group with wins over Alberto Mancini and Javier Frana from Argentina. Another of his best wins came in 1995, when he defeated Mark Philippoussis in the fifth and deciding rubber of their tie, to ensure that Australia was relegated for the first time in Davis Cup history.

== ATP Challenger and ITF Futures finals ==
=== Singles: 3 (0–3) ===
Legend ATP Challenger (0–3) ITF Futures (0–0)	Finals by surface Hard (0–0) Clay (0–3) Grass (0–0) Carpet (0–0)

Result	W–L	Date	Tournament	Tier	Surface	Opponent	Score
Loss	0–1	Sep 1995	Budapest, Hungary	Challenger	Clay	(Spain) Carlos Moyá	2–6, 7–6, 4–6
Loss	0–2	Jun 1996	Braunschweig, Germany	Challenger	Clay	(Spain) Alberto Berasategui	2–6, 2–6
Loss	0–3	Sep 1996	Skopje, Macedonia	Challenger	Clay	(Sweden) Lars Jönsson	3–6, 1–6

== Davis Cup ==
=== Participations: (9–11) ===
Group membership World Group (1–3) WG Play-off (5–3) Group I (3–5) Group II (0–0) Group III (0–0) Group IV (0–0)	Matches by surface Hard (1–1) Clay (6–2) Grass (0–0) Carpet (2–8)	Matches by type Singles (9–11) Doubles (0–0)

- ▲ ▼ indicates the outcome of the Davis Cup match followed by the score, date, place of event, the zonal classification and its phase, and the court surface.

Rubber outcome	No.	Rubber	Match type (partner if any)	Opponent nation	Opponent player(s)	Score
▲4–1; 26–28 March 1993; Vasas Sport Club, Budapest, Hungary; Europe/Africa First round; Carpet (indoor) surface
Defeat	1	II	Singles	Finland	Olli Rahnasto	6–1, 4–6, 5–7, 3–6
Victory	2	V	Singles	Finland	Tuomas Ketola	6–3, 6–2
▲3–2; 30 April – 2 May 1993; Újpesti Torna Egylet, Budapest, Hungary; Europe/Africa Second round; Clay surface
Victory	3	I	Singles	(United Kingdom) Great Britain	Chris Wilkinson	6–4, 6–2, 7–5
Victory	4	IV	Singles	(United Kingdom) Great Britain	Jeremy Bates	6–4, 7–5, 3–6, 7–6^{(7–4)}
▲4–1; 24–26 September 1993; Újpesti Torna Egylet, Budapest, Hungary; World Group Play off; Clay surface
Victory	5	II	Singles	Argentina	Alberto Mancini	7–6^{(7–4)}, 6–3, 6–2
Victory	6	IV	Singles	Argentina	Javier Frana	6–2, 6–4, 4–6, 6–3
▼1–4; 25–27 March 1994; Palais des Sports, Besançon, France; World Group First round; Hard (indoor) surface
Victory	7	II	Singles	France	Henri Leconte	6–4, 7–6^{(7–4)}, 6–3
Defeat	8	IV	Singles	France	Arnaud Boetsch	3–6, 3–6, 1–6
▼1–4; 23–25 September 1994; Római Tennis Academy, Budapest, Hungary; World Group Play off; Clay surface
Defeat	9	I	Singles	Italy	Andrea Gaudenzi	2–6, 6–4, 3–6, 3–6
Victory	10	V	Singles	Italy	Renzo Furlan	2–6, 7–5, 6–1
