= 1999 Torneo Godó – Singles =

Singles
- 1999 Torneo Godó

Final
- Champion: (Spain) Félix Mantilla
- Runner-up: (Morocco) Karim Alami
- Score: 7–6^{(7–2)}, 6–3, 6–3

Details
- Draw: 56
- Seeds: 16

Events
Singles	Doubles
- Torneo Godó

Félix Mantilla defeated Karim Alami in the final, 7–6^{(7–2)}, 6–3, 6–3 to win the singles tennis title at the 1999 Barcelona Open.

Todd Martin was the defending champion, but he lost in the semifinals to Alami.

This tournament marked the ATP Tour debut for future world No. 5 Tommy Robredo; he lost in the third round to Martin.

== Seeds ==
Champion seeds are indicated in bold text while text in italics indicates the round in which those seeds were eliminated.

1. (United States) Pete Sampras (withdrew)
2. (Spain) Carlos Moyá (quarterfinals)
3. (Russia) Yevgeny Kafelnikov (second round)
4. (Spain) Àlex Corretja (second round)
5. (United Kingdom) Tim Henman (third round)
6. (United States) Todd Martin (semifinals)
7. (Australia) Mark Philippoussis (second round)
8. (Chile) Marcelo Ríos (third round)
9. (Spain) Albert Costa (quarterfinals)
10. (Spain) **Félix Mantilla (champions)**
11. (Spain) Francisco Clavet (semifinals)
12. (Russia) Marat Safin (second round)
13. (Switzerland) Marc Rosset (first round)
14. (Spain) Alberto Berasategui (quarterfinals)
15. (Sweden) Magnus Gustafsson (first round)
16. (Czech Republic) Bohdan Ulihrach (second round)

== Draw ==
Key

- Q = Qualifier
- WC = Wild card
- LL = Lucky loser
- Alt = Alternate
- ITF = ITF entry
- PR = Protected ranking
- SR = Special ranking
- SE = Special exempt
- JE = Junior exempt
- JR = Junior Accelerator Programme entrant
- CO = College Accelerator Programme entrant
- NG = Next Gen Accelerator Program entrant
- w/o = Walkover
- r = Retired
- d = Defaulted

=== Finals ===
Semifinals
**(Morocco) Karim Alami**	**6**	**6**
6	(United States) Todd Martin	3	4
11	(Spain) Francisco Clavet	3	2
10	**(Spain) Félix Mantilla**	**6**	**6**

Final
(Morocco) Karim Alami	6	3	3
10	**(Spain) Félix Mantilla**	**7**	**6**	**6**

=== Top half ===
==== Section 1 ====
First round
**(United States) V Spadea**	**6**	**6**
(Sweden) M Norman	4	3
**(Australia) A Ilie**	**6**	**6**
(Germany) M-K Goellner	4	3
**(Morocco) K Alami**	3	**6**	**6**
15	(Sweden) M Gustafsson	**6**	1	2
9	**(Spain) A Costa**	**6**	**6**
(Italy) A Gaudenzi	3	2
**(Spain) F Vicente**	**6**	**7**
(United States) R Agénor	4	5
**(Romania) A Pavel**	**6**	6	**6**
(Spain) C Costa	3	**7**	1

Second round
(France) R Gilbert	3	0
**(United States) V Spadea**	**6**	**6**
(Australia) A Ilie	3	1
**(Morocco) K Alami**	**6**	**6**
9	**(Spain) A Costa**	**6**	**6**
(Spain) F Vicente	4	1
(Romania) A Pavel	**6**	3	2
8	**(Chile) M Ríos**	3	**6**	**6**

Third round
(United States) V Spadea	3	3
**(Morocco) K Alami**	**6**	**6**
9	**(Spain) A Costa**	**6**	**6**
8	(Chile) M Ríos	4	1

Quarterfinals
**(Morocco) K Alami**	**6**	**7**
9	(Spain) A Costa	4	5

==== Section 2 ====
First round
**(Argentina) F Squillari**	**7**	**6**
(Spain) J Sánchez	6	2
**(Spain) A Portas**	**6**	**6**
(Ukraine) A Medvedev	4	1
14	**(Spain) A Berasategui**	**6**	**6**
(France) A Di Pasquale	3	2
12	**(Russia) Marat Safin**	**6**	**7**
(Spain) Ó Serrano	1	6
**(Spain) T Robredo**	**7**	**6**
(Italy) D Sanguinetti	6	1
**(France) A Clément**	**6**	6	**6**
(Netherlands) P Haarhuis	4	**7**	4

Second round
3	(Russia) Y Kafelnikov	2	4
**(Argentina) F Squillari**	**6**	**6**
(Spain) A Portas	6	**6**	1
14	**(Spain) A Berasategui**	**7**	2	**6**
12	(Russia) M Safin	**6**	4	4
**(Spain) T Robredo**	1	**6**	**6**
(France) A Clément	4	6
6	**(United States) T Martin**	**6**	**7**

Third round
(Argentina) F Squillari	0	6
14	**(Spain) A Berasategui**	**6**	**7**
(Spain) T Robredo	3	6
6	**(United States) T Martin**	**6**	**7**

Quarterfinals
14	(Spain) A Berasategui	**6**	5	3
6	**(United States) T Martin**	3	**7**	**6**

=== Bottom half ===
==== Section 3 ====
First round
**(Argentina) M Puerta**	**6**	2	**6**
(Romania) A Voinea	3	**6**	4
**(Argentina) M Zabaleta**	6	**7**	**6**
(France) S Grosjean	**7**	6	1
11	**(Spain) F Clavet**	**6**	**6**
(Spain) J Alonso	4	4
**(Brazil) F Meligeni**	**6**	**6**
13	(Switzerland) M Rosset	3	2
**(Costa Rica) JA Marín**	**6**	**7**
(Brazil) F Costa	3	6
**(Morocco) Y El Aynaoui**	**7**	**6**
(Sweden) M Larsson	5	3

Second round
(Argentina) M Puerta	6	**7**	5
5	**(United Kingdom) T Henman**	**7**	6	**7**
(Argentina) M Zabaleta	3	3
11	**(Spain) F Clavet**	**6**	**6**
**(Brazil) F Meligeni**	**6**	**6**
(Costa Rica) JA Marín	2	2
**(Morocco) Y El Aynaoui**	**7**	**6**
4	(Spain) À Corretja	6	3

Third round
5	(United Kingdom) T Henman	1	4
11	**(Spain) F Clavet**	**6**	**6**
**(Brazil) F Meligeni**	3	**7**	**6**
(Morocco) Y El Aynaoui	**6**	6	1

Quarterfinals
11	**(Spain) F Clavet**	1	**7**	**7**
(Brazil) F Meligeni	**6**	5	6

==== Section 4 ====
First round
**(Italy) R Furlan**	**6**	**6**
(Morocco) H Arazi	3	4
**(Spain) A Martín**	**6**	**6**
(Czech Republic) J Novák	0	1
10	**(Spain) F Mantilla**	**6**	**6**
(Spain) G Blanco	2	0
16	**(Czech Republic) B Ulihrach**	**7**	**6**
(Spain) F Roig	6	1
**(Spain) JC Ferrero**	**6**	4	**6**
(Spain) T Carbonell	3	**6**	4
**(Spain) G Puentes**	**7**	**7**
(Argentina) F Cabello	6	6

Second round
7	(Australia) M Philippoussis	**6**	6	6
**(Italy) R Furlan**	4	**7**	**7**
(Spain) A Martín	3	2
10	**(Spain) F Mantilla**	**6**	**6**
16	(Czech Republic) B Ulihrach	2	**7**	3
**(Spain) JC Ferrero**	**6**	6	**6**
(Spain) G Puentes	3	**6**	3
2	**(Spain) C Moyá**	**6**	4	**6**

Third round
(Italy) R Furlan	3	0
10	**(Spain) F Mantilla**	**6**	**6**
(Spain) JC Ferrero	5	**7**	4
2	**(Spain) C Moyá**	**7**	5	**6**

Quarterfinals
10	**(Spain) F Mantilla**	4	**6**	**6**
2	(Spain) C Moyá	**6**	2	3
