= Cyril Buscaglione =

French tennis player (born 1972)

- Country (sports): France
- Born: 24 March 1972 (age 52); Antibes
- Plays: Right-handed
- Prize money: $17,040

Singles
- Career record: 0–0
- Career titles: 1 ITF
- Highest ranking: No. 286 (28 October 1996)

Doubles
- Career record: 0–0
- Career titles: 1 Challenger
- Highest ranking: No. 268 (7 October 1996)
- Last updated on: 26 August 2019.

Cyril Buscaglione (born 24 March 1972) is a retired French tennis player.

Buscaglione has a career high ATP singles ranking of 286 achieved on 28 October 1996. He also has a career high doubles ranking of 268 achieved on 7 October 1996.

Buscaglione has won 1 ATP Challenger doubles title at the 1997 Tampere Open.

== Tour titles ==
Legend
Grand Slam (0)
ATP Masters Series (0)
ATP Tour (0)
Challengers (1)

=== Doubles ===
Result	Date	Category	Tournament	Surface	Partner	Opponents	Score
Winner	July 1997	Challenger	Tampere, Finland	Clay	(France) Régis Lavergne	(Finland) Tuomas Ketola (Slovenia) Borut Urh	6–4, 6–3
