= 1997 French Open – Men's singles =

Men's singles
- 1997 French Open

Final
- Champion: (Brazil) Gustavo Kuerten
- Runner-up: (Spain) Sergi Bruguera
- Score: 6–3, 6–4, 6–2

Details
- Draw: 128
- Seeds: 16

Events
Singles	men	women		boys	girls
Doubles	men	women	mixed	boys	girls
WC Singles	men	women	quad
WC Doubles	men	women	quad
Legends	−45	45+	women
← 1996 ·	French Open	· 1998 →

Gustavo Kuerten defeated Sergi Bruguera in the final, 6–3, 6–4, 6–2 to win the men's singles tennis title at the 1997 French Open. It was his first major singles title. He was the first unseeded player since Mats Wilander in 1982 and the second-lowest ranked player ever to win a major, and the first Brazilian man to win a singles major. Following the win, Kuerten jumped in the rankings from world No. 66 to No. 15.

Yevgeny Kafelnikov was the defending champion, but lost to Kuerten in the quarterfinals. Kuerten defeated all three of the most recent French Open champions en route to the title: 1993 and 1994 champion Bruguera in the final, 1995 champion Thomas Muster in the third round, and 1996 champion Kafelnikov in the quarterfinals.

== Seeds ==
1. (United States) Pete Sampras (third round)
2. (United States) Michael Chang (fourth round)
3. (Russia) Yevgeny Kafelnikov (quarterfinals)
4. (Croatia) Goran Ivanišević (first round)
5. (Austria) Thomas Muster (third round)
6. (Netherlands) Richard Krajicek (third round)
7. (Chile) Marcelo Ríos (fourth round)
8. (Spain) Àlex Corretja (fourth round)

9. (Spain) Carlos Moyá (second round)
10. (Spain) Félix Mantilla (second round)
11. (Spain) Albert Costa (third round)
12. (Spain) Alberto Berasategui (first round)
13. (South Africa) Wayne Ferreira (third round)
14. (United Kingdom) Tim Henman (first round)
15. (Switzerland) Marc Rosset (fourth round)
16. (Spain) Sergi Bruguera (final)

Click on the seed number of a player to go to their draw section.

== Draw ==
=== Key ===
- Q = Qualifier
- WC = Wild card
- LL = Lucky loser
- Alt = Alternate
- ITF = ITF entry
- PR = Protected ranking
- SR = Special ranking
- SE = Special exempt
- JE = Junior exempt
- JR = Junior Accelerator Programme entrant
- CO = College Accelerator Programme entrant
- NG = Next Gen Accelerator Program entrant
- w/o = Walkover
- r = Retired
- d = Defaulted

=== Finals ===
Quarterfinals
(Sweden) Magnus Norman	2	7^{7}	4	3
Q	(Belgium) Filip Dewulf	6	6^{2}	6	6
3	(Russia) Yevgeny Kafelnikov	2	7	6	0	4
(Brazil) Gustavo Kuerten	6	5	2	6	6
(Australia) Patrick Rafter	6	7^{7}	6
(Spain) Galo Blanco	3	6^{3}	3
(Morocco) Hicham Arazi	6	3	2	2
16	(Spain) Sergi Bruguera	4	6	6	6

Semifinals
Q	(Belgium) Filip Dewulf	1	6	1	6^{4}
(Brazil) Gustavo Kuerten	6	3	6	7^{7}
(Australia) Patrick Rafter	7^{8}	1	5	6^{1}
16	(Spain) Sergi Bruguera	6^{6}	6	7	7^{7}

Final
(Brazil) Gustavo Kuerten	6	6	6
16	(Spain) Sergi Bruguera	3	4	2

=== Top half ===
==== Section 1 ====
First round
1	(United States) P Sampras	6	7	6
(France) F Santoro	3	5	1
LL	(Argentina) M Charpentier	6	4	7^{7}	1	3
(Spain) F Clavet	3	6	6^{2}	6	6
(United Kingdom) G Rusedski	3	2	6	6	7
(Sweden) M Norman	6	6	3	4	9
(India) L Paes	6	3	6	6
(South Africa) G Stafford	4	6	3	2
Q	(Russia) A Merinov	0	2	6^{10}
(France) L Roux	6	6	7^{12}
(Canada) S Lareau	2	6	6	4	8
(Argentina) H Gumy	6	4	4	6	6
(Australia) J Stoltenberg	6	6	4	6
(Germany) A Rădulescu	0	4	6	4
(Slovakia) D Hrbatý	5	6	6^{2}	4
15	(Switzerland) M Rosset	7	3	7^{7}	6

Second round
1	(United States) P Sampras	6	6	6
(Spain) F Clavet	1	2	2
(Sweden) M Norman	6	6	3	6
(India) L Paes	3	2	6	3
(France) L Roux	7	6	6
(Canada) S Lareau	5	2	4
(Australia) J Stoltenberg	2	3	4
15	(Switzerland) M Rosset	6	6	6

Third round
1	(United States) P Sampras	2	4	6	4
(Sweden) M Norman	6	6	2	6
(France) L Roux	3	7	2	3
15	(Switzerland) M Rosset	6	5	6	6

Fourth round
(Sweden) M Norman	4	6	7^{7}	6
15	(Switzerland) M Rosset	6	3	6^{3}	3

==== Section 2 ====
First round
9	(Spain) C Moyá	6	6	5	6	6
Q	(Spain) A Martín	3	7	7	3	3
WC	(France) G Solvès	5	1	3
Q	(Spain) A Portas	7	6	6
Q	(Italy) C Caratti	3	3	1
Q	(Belgium) F Dewulf	6	6	6
(Brazil) F Meligeni	6	6^{3}	6	7
(Argentina) J Frana	4	7^{7}	4	5
WC	(France) S Huet	7	6	5	3	4
WC	(France) T Champion	5	4	7	6	6
Q	(Paraguay) R Delgado	2	7^{7}	7	6
(Netherlands) S Schalken	6	6^{2}	5	4
(Germany) D Prinosil	4	4	6	6	4
Q	(Germany) J Knippschild	6	6	3	4	6
(Morocco) K Alami	3	4	1
8	(Spain) À Corretja	6	6	6

Second round
9	(Spain) C Moyá	4	6	5	3
Q	(Spain) A Portas	6	4	7	6
Q	(Belgium) F Dewulf	6	6	3	1	6
(Brazil) F Meligeni	4	2	6	6	3
WC	(France) T Champion	6	6	6
Q	(Paraguay) R Delgado	2	3	3
Q	(Germany) J Knippschild	6	1	1	6^{8}
8	(Spain) À Corretja	4	6	6	7^{10}

Third round
Q	(Spain) A Portas	3	6^{5}	6	7^{8}	6
Q	(Belgium) F Dewulf	6	7^{7}	4	6^{6}	8
WC	(France) T Champion	1	0	r
8	(Spain) À Corretja	6	3

Fourth round
Q	(Belgium) F Dewulf	5	6	6	7
8	(Spain) À Corretja	7	1	4	5

==== Section 3 ====
First round
3	(Russia) Y Kafelnikov	6	6	6
(Czech Republic) M Damm	2	4	4
(France) G Raoux	6	6	6
(United States) V Spadea	2	0	1
Q	(Austria) W Schranz	4	2	3
Q	(Argentina) G Etlis	6	6	6
(Germany) O Gross	4	4	6	5
(France) C Pioline	6	6	3	7
Q	(Spain) S Navarro	1	6	6	6^{2}	6
(Spain) M A Gorriz	6	4	2	7^{7}	1
WC	(France) S Grosjean	3	6	4	4
(Netherlands) J Siemerink	6	4	6	6
(Sweden) N Kulti	2	6	6	4	4
(Australia) M Philippoussis	6	4	3	6	6
WC	(France) O Delaître	6	2	1	6	6
14	(United Kingdom) T Henman	2	6	6	2	4

Second round
3	(Russia) Y Kafelnikov	7	6	6
(France) G Raoux	5	3	4
Q	(Argentina) G Etlis	6	3	3	6^{3}
(France) C Pioline	2	6	6	7^{7}
Q	(Spain) S Navarro	1	7^{7}	1	2
(Netherlands) J Siemerink	6	6^{1}	6	6
(Australia) M Philippoussis	6	3	6	6
WC	(France) O Delaître	4	6	1	4

Third round
3	(Russia) Y Kafelnikov	7	6	6^{3}	1	6
(France) C Pioline	5	4	7^{7}	6	4
(Netherlands) J Siemerink	4	4	2
(Australia) M Philippoussis	6	6	6

Fourth round
3	(Russia) Y Kafelnikov	6	6	7
(Australia) M Philippoussis	2	3	5

==== Section 4 ====
First round
12	(Spain) A Berasategui	4	6	6	2	1^{r}
(Ukraine) A Medvedev	6	4	2	6	2
(Norway) C Ruud	7	4	1	1^{r}
(Spain) J A Viloca	5	6	6	4
(United States) J Stark	6	7^{7}	7^{7}
(Argentina) M Zabaleta	4	6^{2}	6^{5}
(Sweden) T Johansson	3	6	5	6^{3}
WC	(France) N Escudé	6	2	7	7^{7}
(Brazil) G Kuerten	6	7	6
(Czech Republic) S Doseděl	0	5	1
(Sweden) J Björkman	6	6	1	6
(United States) R Reneberg	2	1	6	2
(Uruguay) M Filippini	6	2	7	6^{7}	4
(United States) J Tarango	4	6	5	7^{9}	6
(Germany) M-K Goellner	6	6^{4}	2	7^{7}	4
5	(Austria) T Muster	4	7^{7}	6	6^{2}	6

Second round
(Ukraine) A Medvedev	6	6	6
(Spain) J A Viloca	4	3	4
(United States) J Stark	4	2	2
WC	(France) N Escudé	6	6	6
(Brazil) G Kuerten	6	6	4	7
(Sweden) J Björkman	4	2	6	5
(United States) J Tarango	5	6	2	1
5	(Austria) T Muster	7	1	6	6

Third round
(Ukraine) A Medvedev	7^{7}	6	6
WC	(France) N Escudé	6^{2}	4	3
(Brazil) G Kuerten	6^{3}	6	6	3	6
5	(Austria) T Muster	7^{7}	1	3	6	4

Fourth round
(Ukraine) A Medvedev	7	1	2	6	5
(Brazil) G Kuerten	5	6	6	1	7

=== Bottom half ===
==== Section 5 ====
First round
6	(Netherlands) R Krajicek	7^{7}	6	6
(Australia) S Draper	6^{3}	2	1
(Czech Republic) B Ulihrach	6	6	6
(Germany) N Kiefer	3	3	3
(Sweden) P Fredriksson	3	7^{8}	0	6	2
WC	(France) F Fontang	6	6^{6}	6	4	6
(Italy) A Gaudenzi	6	6^{3}	3	4
(Australia) P Rafter	3	7^{7}	6	6
(Australia) M Woodforde	5	7^{8}	6^{10}	6	8
(Spain) J Sánchez	7	6^{6}	7^{12}	4	6
(Canada) D Nestor	1	1	6	2
(Russia) A Volkov	6	6	3	6
(Romania) A Pavel	6	7	6
(United States) A O'Brien	4	5	0
(Romania) A Voinea	4	5	4
11	(Spain) A Costa	6	7	6

Second round
6	(Netherlands) R Krajicek	6	3	6	6
(Czech Republic) B Ulihrach	2	6	2	3
WC	(France) F Fontang	3	4	3
(Australia) P Rafter	6	6	6
(Australia) M Woodforde	7^{7}	6	7
(Russia) A Volkov	6^{5}	3	5
(Romania) A Pavel	1	6	6	3	4
11	(Spain) A Costa	6	4	0	6	6

Third round
6	(Netherlands) R Krajicek	3	6	4	2
(Australia) P Rafter	6	4	6	6
(Australia) M Woodforde	6	7^{7}	6
11	(Spain) A Costa	4	6^{2}	3

Fourth round
(Australia) P Rafter	6	5	6	6
(Australia) M Woodforde	2	7	1	2

==== Section 6 ====
First round
13	(South Africa) W Ferreira	6^{1}	7^{7}	6^{1}	6	6
(Sweden) M Tillström	7^{7}	6^{3}	7^{7}	3	1
(Spain) E Benfele Álvarez	7	6^{3}	3	5
(Spain) R Carretero	5	7^{7}	6	7
(United States) D Flach	4	0	1
(Spain) C Costa	6	6	6
Q	(Spain) J Burillo	4	0	6^{4}
(Czech Republic) P Korda	6	6	7^{7}
(Czech Republic) D Vacek	4	2	3
(United States) C Woodruff	6	6	6
LL	(Denmark) F Fetterlein	4	1	2
Q	(Ecuador) N Lapentti	6	6	6
(South Africa) N Godwin	3	2	6	5
(Spain) G Blanco	6	6	1	7
(Sweden) M Gustafsson	4	6	7^{7}	6
4	(Croatia) G Ivanišević	6	3	6^{3}	3

Second round
13	(South Africa) W Ferreira	7^{7}	4	6	2	6
(Spain) R Carretero	6^{4}	6	1	6	4
(Spain) C Costa	3	5	4
(Czech Republic) P Korda	6	7	6
(United States) C Woodruff	6	5	3	6	6
Q	(Ecuador) N Lapentti	4	7	6	4	1
(Spain) G Blanco	6	4	6	7^{7}
(Sweden) M Gustafsson	4	6	4	6^{1}

Third round
13	(South Africa) W Ferreira	w/o
(Czech Republic) P Korda
(United States) C Woodruff	6^{6}	3	6^{2}
(Spain) G Blanco	7^{8}	6	7^{7}

Fourth round
(Czech Republic) P Korda	6	1	5	4
(Spain) G Blanco	1	6	7	6

==== Section 7 ====
First round
7	(Chile) M Ríos	6	5	4	6	6
Q	(Zimbabwe) W Black	4	7	6	2	1
(Argentina) F Squillari	6	3	3	3
(Zimbabwe) B Black	1	6	6	6
(France) A Boetsch	6	6	6
(Slovakia) K Kučera	1	1	4
(South Africa) M Ondruska	7^{7}	6	6
Q	(Argentina) M Pastura	6^{3}	2	1
(Denmark) K Carlsen	6^{6}	6	4	0
(Australia) T Woodbridge	7^{8}	4	6	6
(Germany) H Dreekmann	3	4	2
(Morocco) H Arazi	6	6	6
(United States) J Courier	1	2	6	6	4
(Sweden) M Larsson	6	6	4	1	6
(Australia) R Fromberg	3	2	2
10	(Spain) F Mantilla	6	6	6

Second round
7	(Chile) M Ríos	6^{3}	6^{0}	6	7^{7}	6
(Zimbabwe) B Black	7^{7}	7^{7}	4	6^{4}	0
(France) A Boetsch	6	6	6
(South Africa) M Ondruska	3	2	1
(Australia) T Woodbridge	4	5	2
(Morocco) H Arazi	6	7	6
(Sweden) M Larsson	6	6	3	6
10	(Spain) F Mantilla	2	4	6	3

Third round
7	(Chile) M Ríos	7^{8}	6	6
(France) A Boetsch	6^{6}	3	4
(Morocco) H Arazi	6	6	7
(Sweden) M Larsson	2	3	5

Fourth round
7	(Chile) M Ríos	2	1	7	6^{4}
(Morocco) H Arazi	6	6	5	7^{7}

==== Section 8 ====
First round
16	(Spain) S Bruguera	6	0	6	6
(Belgium) J Van Herck	3	6	2	0
(Netherlands) P Haarhuis	2	4	7	4
(Netherlands) D van Scheppingen	6	6	5	6
(Armenia) S Sargsian	2	5	3
Q	(Belgium) D Norman	6	7	6
(Australia) S Stolle	7	6	4	6
(Italy) R Furlan	5	1	6	3
LL	(Hungary) J Krocskó	7	6	4	7^{7}
(Slovakia) J Krošlák	5	3	6	6^{5}
(Austria) G Schaller	6	4	6	4	2
(France) S Simian	2	6	4	6	6
WC	(France) A Clément	1	2	3
(France) J Golmard	6	6	6
Q	(France) R Gilbert	2	3	2
2	(United States) M Chang	6	6	6

Second round
16	(Spain) S Bruguera	6	6	6
(Netherlands) D van Scheppingen	2	3	3
Q	(Belgium) D Norman	5	6	7^{7}	6
(Australia) S Stolle	7	4	6^{2}	3
LL	(Hungary) J Krocskó	3	3	6^{3}
(France) S Simian	6	6	7^{7}
(France) J Golmard	2	3	6	2
2	(United States) M Chang	6	6	3	6

Third round
16	(Spain) S Bruguera	6	6	6
Q	(Belgium) D Norman	3	1	3
(France) S Simian	1	2^{r}
2	(United States) M Chang	6	5

Fourth round
16	(Spain) S Bruguera	3	6	6	6
2	(United States) M Chang	6	4	3	4

Preceded by 1997 Australian Open – Men's singles	Grand Slam men's singles	Succeeded by 1997 Wimbledon Championships – Men's singles
