= 2000 Torneo Godó =

- Date: 24–30 April
- Edition: 48th
- Category: International Series Gold
- Draw: 56S / 28D
- Prize money: $900,000
- Surface: Clay / outdoor
- Location: Barcelona, Spain
- Venue: Real Club de Tenis Barcelona

Champions

Singles
- (Russia) Marat Safin

Doubles
- (Sweden) Nicklas Kulti / (Sweden) Mikael Tillström
← 1999 ·	Torneo Godó	· 2001 →

The 2000 Torneo Godó was the 48th edition of the Torneo Godó annual men's tennis tournament played on clay courts in Barcelona, Spain and it took place from 24 April until 30 April 2000. It was part of the ATP International Series Gold of the 2000 ATP Tour. Unseeded Marat Safin won the singles title.

This event also carried the joint denominations of the Campeonatos Internacionales de España or Spanish International Championships that was hosted at this venue and location, and was 33rd edition to be held in Barcelona, and the Open Seat Godó' and is the 5th edition branded under that name.

== Finals ==
=== Singles ===
(Russia) Marat Safin defeated (Spain) Juan Carlos Ferrero, 6–3, 6–3, 6–4.

=== Doubles ===
(Sweden) Nicklas Kulti / (Sweden) Mikael Tillström defeated (Netherlands) Paul Haarhuis / (Australia) Sandon Stolle, 6–2, 6–7^{(2–7)}, 7–6^{(7–5)}.
