= David Salvador-Estepa =

Spanish tennis player (born 1973)

- Country (sports): Spain
- Born: 20 October 1973 (age 51)
- Prize money: $23,301

Singles
- Career record: 0–1
- Highest ranking: No. 286 (4 Aug 1997)

Grand Slam singles results
- French Open: Q2 (1997)
- Wimbledon: Q1 (1996, 1997)

Doubles
- Career record: 0–2
- Highest ranking: No. 253 (8 Jun 1998)

David Salvador-Estepa (born 20 October 1973) is a Spanish former professional tennis player.

Salvador, who comes from Catalonia, was a national representative at the World Youth Cup, alongside Àlex Corretja.

Active on tour during the 1990s, Salvador's career included a win over Emilio Sánchez at the 1996 Alicante Challenger and an ATP Tour singles main draw appearance at the 1997 Torneo Godó. He reached a best singles ranking of 253.
