= 1998 Torneo Godó =

- Date: 13–19 April
- Edition: 46th
- Category: Championship Series
- Draw: 56S / 28D
- Prize money: $825,000
- Surface: Clay / outdoor
- Location: Barcelona, Spain

Champions

Singles
- (United States) Todd Martin

Doubles
- (Netherlands) Jacco Eltingh / (Netherlands) Paul Haarhuis
← 1997 ·	Torneo Godó	· 1999 →

The 1998 Torneo Godó was a men's tennis tournament played on Clay in Barcelona, Spain that was part of the ATP Championship Series of the 1998 ATP Tour. It was the 46th edition of the tournament and was held from 13 April until 19 April 1998.Unseeded Todd Martin won the singles title.

This event also carried the joint denominations of the Campeonatos Internacionales de España or Spanish International Championships that was hosted at this venue and location, and was 31st edition to be held in Barcelona, and the Open Seat Godó' and is the 3rd edition branded under that name.

== Finals ==
=== Singles ===
(United States) Todd Martin defeated (Spain) Alberto Berasategui, 6–2, 1–6, 6–3, 6–2.

- It was Martin's 1st title of the year and the 6th of his career.

=== Doubles ===
(Netherlands) Jacco Eltingh / (Netherlands) Paul Haarhuis defeated (South Africa) Ellis Ferreira / (United States) Rick Leach, 7–5, 6–0.
