= 1999 Torneo Godó – Doubles =

Doubles
- 1999 Torneo Godó

Final
- Champions: (Netherlands) Paul Haarhuis (Russia) Yevgeny Kafelnikov
- Runners-up: (Italy) Massimo Bertolini (Italy) Cristian Brandi
- Score: 7–5, 6–3

Details
- Draw: 28
- Seeds: 8

Events
Singles	Doubles
- Torneo Godó

The 1999 Torneo Godó was a men's tennis tournament played on Clay in Barcelona, Spain that was part of the International Series Gold of the 1999 ATP Tour. It was the 47th edition of the tournament and was held from 12 to 18 April.

== Seeds ==
Champion seeds are indicated in bold text while text in italics indicates the round in which those seeds were eliminated.

1. (South Africa) Ellis Ferreira / (United States) Rick Leach (second round)
2. (Netherlands) **Paul Haarhuis** / (Russia) **Yevgeny Kafelnikov (champions)**
3. (United States) Donald Johnson / (Czech Republic) Cyril Suk (second round)
4. (South Africa) Piet Norval / (Zimbabwe) Kevin Ullyett (second round)
5. (Czech Republic) Jiří Novák / (Czech Republic) David Rikl (first round)
6. (South Africa) Chris Haggard / (United States) Francisco Montana (first round)
7. (South Africa) David Adams / (Czech Republic) Pavel Vízner (first round)
8. (United Kingdom) Neil Broad / (South Africa) Robbie Koenig (first round)

== Draw ==
Key

- Q = Qualifier
- WC = Wild card
- LL = Lucky loser
- Alt = Alternate
- ITF = ITF entry
- PR = Protected ranking
- SR = Special ranking
- SE = Special exempt
- JE = Junior exempt
- JR = Junior Accelerator Programme entrant
- CO = College Accelerator Programme entrant
- NG = Next Gen Accelerator Program entrant
- w/o = Walkover
- r = Retired
- d = Defaulted

=== Finals ===
Semifinals
(Italy) **Massimo Bertolini** **(Italy) Cristian Brandi**	**6**	**7**
(Spain) Alberto Martín (Spain) Javier Sánchez	3	6
(Portugal) Nuno Marques (Belgium) Tom Vanhoudt	2	4
2	(Netherlands) **Paul Haarhuis** **(Russia) Yevgeny Kafelnikov**	**6**	**6**

Final
(Italy) Massimo Bertolini (Italy) Cristian Brandi	5	3
2	(Netherlands) **Paul Haarhuis** **(Russia) Yevgeny Kafelnikov**	**7**	**6**

=== Top half ===
First round
(Argentina) **F Cabello** **(Brazil) F Costa**	**6**	**6**
(Spain) E Nicolás (Spain) G Puentes	4	4
(Germany) **M-K Goellner** **(Russia) A Olhovskiy**	**6**	**7**
(United States) D Bowen (Romania) A Pavel	3	6
(Italy) **M Bertolini** **(Italy) C Brandi**	5	**6**	**6**
7	(South Africa) D Adams (Czech Republic) P Vízner	**7**	4	3
(Spain) **A Martín** **(Spain) J Sánchez**	**6**	**6**
(Spain) C Moyá (Russia) M Safin	3	3
(Australia) **D Macpherson** **(Sweden) P Nyborg**	**6**	5	**7**
(Spain) À Corretja (Spain) A Costa	2	**7**	6
(Argentina) **P Albano** **(Spain) T Carbonell**	4	**6**	**6**
5	(Czech Republic) J Novák (Czech Republic) D Rikl	**6**	1	1

Second round
1	(South Africa) E Ferreira (United States) R Leach	3	**6**	6
(Argentina) **F Cabello** **(Brazil) F Costa**	**6**	3	**7**
(Germany) M-K Goellner (Russia) A Olhovskiy	2	**6**	0
(Italy) **M Bertolini** **(Italy) C Brandi**	**6**	4	**6**
3	(United States) D Johnson (Czech Republic) C Suk	6	3
(Spain) **A Martín** **(Spain) J Sánchez**	**7**	**6**
(Australia) **D Macpherson** **(Sweden) P Nyborg**	**7**	**6**
(Argentina) P Albano (Spain) T Carbonell	6	3

Quarterfinals
(Argentina) F Cabello (Brazil) F Costa	6	4
(Italy) **M Bertolini** **(Italy) C Brandi**	**7**	**6**
(Spain) **A Martín** **(Spain) J Sánchez**	**6**	**7**
(Australia) D Macpherson (Sweden) P Nyborg	4	6

Semifinals
(Italy) **M Bertolini** **(Italy) C Brandi**	**6**	**7**
(Spain) A Martín (Spain) J Sánchez	3	6

=== Bottom half ===
First round
(North Macedonia) **A Kitinov** **(Brazil) F Meligeni**	**7**	**7**
6	(South Africa) C Haggard (United States) F Montana	6	5
(Portugal) **N Marques** **(Belgium) T Vanhoudt**	**6**	**6**
(Hungary) G Köves (Belgium) L Pimek	3	3
(Spain) **A Berasategui** **(Spain) F Roig**	**7**	2	**6**
(Argentina) D Orsanic (Argentina) M Puerta	5	**6**	2
(Italy) **M Ardinghi** **(Spain) Á López Morón**	**6**	1	**6**
8	(United Kingdom) N Broad (South Africa) R Koenig	2	**6**	3
(Spain) **J Alonso** **(Spain) J Balcells**	**7**	**6**
(United States) A Peterson (Philippines) E Taino	6	3
(United Kingdom) **T Henman** **(United States) P Sampras**	**6**	**7**
(Spain) F Mantilla (Spain) F Vicente	3	6

Second round
(North Macedonia) A Kitinov (Brazil) F Meligeni	4	3
(Portugal) **N Marques** **(Belgium) T Vanhoudt**	**6**	**6**
(Spain) **A Berasategui** **(Spain) F Roig**	**6**	**6**
4	(South Africa) P Norval (Zimbabwe) K Ullyett	4	2
(Italy) M Ardinghi (Spain) Á López Morón	**7**	3	1
(Spain) **J Alonso** **(Spain) J Balcells**	5	**6**	**6**
(United Kingdom) T Henman (United States) P Sampras	2	6
2	(Netherlands) **P Haarhuis** **(Russia) Y Kafelnikov**	**6**	**7**

Quarterfinals
(Portugal) **N Marques** **(Belgium) T Vanhoudt**	**7**	**6**
(Spain) A Berasategui (Spain) F Roig	6	4
(Spain) J Alonso (Spain) J Balcells	2	3
2	(Netherlands) **P Haarhuis** **(Russia) Y Kafelnikov**	**6**	**6**

Semifinals
(Portugal) N Marques (Belgium) T Vanhoudt	2	4
2	(Netherlands) **P Haarhuis** **(Russia) Y Kafelnikov**	**6**	**6**
