= 2001 Trofeo Conde de Godó =

- Date: 23–29 April
- Edition: 49th
- Category: International Series Gold
- Draw: 56S / 28D
- Prize money: $900,000
- Surface: Clay / outdoor
- Location: Barcelona, Spain]
- Venue: Real Club de Tenis Barcelona

Champions

Singles
- (Spain) Juan Carlos Ferrero

Doubles
- (United States) Donald Johnson / (United States) Jared Palmer
← 2000 ·	Torneo Godó	· 2002 →

The 2001 Trofeo Conde de Godó was a men's tennis tournament played on outdoor clay courts at the Real Club de Tenis Barcelona in Barcelona, Spain and was part of the International Series Gold of the 2001 ATP Tour. The tournament ran from 23 April until 29 April 2001. Second-seeded Juan Carlos Ferrero won the singles title.

This event also carried the joint denominations of the Campeonatos Internacionales de España or Spanish International Championships that was hosted at this venue and location, and was 34th edition to be held in Barcelona, and the Open Seat Godó' (sponsorship name) and is the 6th edition branded under that name.

== Finals ==
=== Singles ===
(Spain) Juan Carlos Ferrero defeated (Spain) Carlos Moyá 4–6, 7–5, 6–3, 3–6, 7–5

- It was Ferrero's 3rd singles title of the year and the 4th of his career.

=== Doubles ===
(United States) Donald Johnson / (United States) Jared Palmer defeated (Spain) Tommy Robredo / (Spain) Fernando Vicente 7–6^{(7–2)}, 6–4

- It was Johnson's 3rd title of the year and the 17th of his career. It was Palmer's 2nd title of the year and the 19th of his career.

== Entrants ==
=== Seeds ===
Athlete	Nationality	Ranking*	Seeding
~~Gustavo Kuerten~~	~~Brazil~~	~~2~~	~~1~~
Magnus Norman	Sweden	5	2
Juan Carlos Ferrero	Spain	9	3
Àlex Corretja	Spain	10	4
Arnaud Clément	France	11	5
Dominik Hrbatý	Slovakia	13	6
Thomas Enqvist	Sweden	14	7
Sébastien Grosjean	France	15	8
Franco Squillari	Argentina	18	9
Cédric Pioline	France	21	10
Carlos Moyá	Spain	25	11
Gastón Gaudio	Argentina	26	12
Vladimir Voltchkov	Belarus	27	13
Nicolas Escudé	France	31	14
Francisco Clavet	Spain	34	15
Albert Costa	Spain	36	16

- Rankings as of April 16, 2001.
