= Salvador Navarro =

Spanish tennis player (born 1977)

- Country (sports): Spain
- Born: 8 January 1977 (age 48); Barcelona, Spain
- Height: 1.80 m (5 ft 11 in)
- Turned pro: 1995
- Plays: Right-handed
- Prize money: $257,406

Singles
- Career record: 4–7
- Career titles: 0
- Highest ranking: No. 157 (8 Sep 2003)

Grand Slam singles results
- Australian Open: Q2 (1999)
- French Open: 2R (1997)
- Wimbledon: Q2 (2001, 2003)
- US Open: Q2 (2004)

Doubles
- Career record: 4–7
- Career titles: 0
- Highest ranking: No. 138 (19 Jul 1999)

Salvador Navarro Gutiérrez (born 8 January 1977) is a former professional tennis player from Spain.

== Career ==
Navarro qualified for his only Grand Slam in 1997, at the French Open. He won his opening round match against countryman Marcos Aurelio Gorriz, in five sets, but would lose to Jan Siemerink in the second round.

He never made a quarter-final during his singles career on the ATP Tour but did have a win over world number 27 Sébastien Grosjean at the 2000 Torneo Godó, held in his hometown of Barcelona.

The right-hander also played doubles and was a semi-finalist, with partner Óscar Hernández, in the 2003 CAM Open Comunidad Valenciana. Despite only entering the tournament after another team withdrew, the Spanish pairing were able to upset third seeds Gastón Etlis and Martin Rodríguez in the quarter-finals.

== Challenger titles ==
=== Singles: (2) ===
No.	Year	Tournament	Surface	Opponent	Score
1.	2000	Armonk, United States	Clay	(Mexico) Alejandro Hernández	6–1, 3–6, 6–3
2.	2001	Sylt, Germany	Clay	(Netherlands) Dennis van Scheppingen	6–3, 7–6^{(9–7)}

=== Doubles: (7) ===
No.	Year	Tournament	Surface	Partner	Opponents	Score
1.	1998	Seville, Spain	Clay	(Spain) Alberto Martín	(Netherlands) Edwin Kempes (Netherlands) Rogier Wassen	2–6, 7–5, 6–3
2.	2000	Sassuolo, Italy	Clay	(Spain) Álex Calatrava	(Italy) Daniele Bracciali (Italy) Federico Luzzi	6–7^{(5–7)}, 6–1, 6–4
3.	2001	Edinburgh, Great Britain	Clay	(Italy) Filippo Messori	(South Africa) Justin Bower (South Africa) Damien Roberts	6–2, 7–6^{(7–4)}
4.	2001	Mantua, Italy	Clay	(Italy) Stefano Galvani	(Brazil) Alessandro Guevara (Brazil) Rodrigo Ribeiro	7–6^{(8–6)}, 7–6^{(7–4)}
5.	2002	Furth, Germany	Clay	(Spain) Gabriel Trujillo-Soler	(Russia) Vadim Kutsenko (Uzbekistan) Oleg Ogorodov	6–2, 6–4
6.	2004	Brașov, Romania	Clay	(Spain) Rubén Ramírez Hidalgo	(Argentina) Juan Pablo Brzezicki (Argentina) Juan Pablo Guzmán	6–3, 6–2
7.	2006	Scheveningen, Netherlands	Clay	(Spain) Guillermo García-López	(France) Marc Gicquel (France) Édouard Roger-Vasselin	6–4, 0–6, [11–9]
