= 1997 French Open =

- Date: 26 May – 8 June 1997
- Edition: 96
- Category: 67th Grand Slam (ITF)
- Surface: Clay
- Location: Paris (XVI^{e}), France
- Venue: Stade Roland Garros

Champions

Men's singles
- (Brazil) Gustavo Kuerten

Women's singles
- (Croatia) Iva Majoli

Men's doubles
- (Russia) Yevgeny Kafelnikov / (Czech Republic) Daniel Vacek

Women's doubles
- (United States) Gigi Fernández / (Belarus) Natalia Zvereva

Mixed doubles
- (Japan) Rika Hiraki / (India) Mahesh Bhupathi
← 1996 ·	French Open	· 1998 →

The 1997 French Open was a tennis tournament that took place on the outdoor clay courts at the Stade Roland Garros in Paris, France. The tournament was held from 26 May until 8 June. It was the 96th staging of the French Open, and the second Grand Slam tennis event of 1997.

== Seniors ==
=== Men's singles ===
(Brazil) Gustavo Kuerten (Note: Kuerten became the first male tennis player from Brazil to win a Grand Slam singles title. He also became the 2nd unseeded men's singles winner (after Mats Wilander in 1982).) defeated (Spain) Sergi Bruguera, 6–3, 6–4, 6–2

• It was Kuerten's 1st career Grand Slam singles title (and his 1st title overall).

=== Women's singles ===
(Croatia) Iva Majoli (Note: Majoli became the first tennis player from Croatia (male or female) to win a Grand Slam singles title.) defeated (Switzerland) Martina Hingis, 6–4, 6–2

• It was Majoli's 1st and only career Grand Slam singles title.

=== Men's doubles ===
(Russia) Yevgeny Kafelnikov / (Czech Republic) Daniel Vacek defeated (Australia) Todd Woodbridge / (Australia) Mark Woodforde, 7–6, 4–6, 6–3

• It was Kafelnikov's 2nd career Grand Slam doubles title and his 2nd (consecutive) title at the French Open.
• It was Vacek's 2nd career Grand Slam doubles title and his 2nd (consecutive) title at the French Open.

=== Women's doubles ===
(United States) Gigi Fernández / (Belarus) Natalia Zvereva defeated (United States) Mary Joe Fernández / (United States) Lisa Raymond, 6–2, 6–3

• It was Fernández' 16th career Grand Slam doubles title and her 6th and last title at the French Open.
• It was Zvereva's 17th career Grand Slam doubles title and her 6th and last title at the French Open.

=== Mixed doubles ===
(Japan) Rika Hiraki / (India) Mahesh Bhupathi defeated (United States) Lisa Raymond / (United States) Patrick Galbraith, 6–4, 6–1

• It was Hiraki's 1st and only career Grand Slam mixed doubles title.
• It was Bhupathi's 1st career Grand Slam mixed doubles title.

== Juniors ==
=== Boys' singles ===
(Germany) Daniel Elsner defeated (Peru) Luis Horna, 6–4, 6–4

=== Girls' singles ===
(Belgium) Justine Henin (Note: Henin won the 2003 women's singles crown, and would go to win 4 singles titles (in 2003, 2005, 2006 and 2007).) defeated (Zimbabwe) Cara Black, 4–6, 6–4, 6–4

=== Boys' doubles ===
(Venezuela) José de Armas / (Peru) Luis Horna (Note: Horna won the 2008 men's doubles crown.) defeated (France) Arnaud Di Pasquale / (France) Julien Jeanpierre, 6–4, 2–6, 7–5

=== Girls' doubles ===
(Zimbabwe) Cara Black (Note: Black won the 2003 mixed doubles title.) / (Kazakhstan) Irina Selyutina defeated (Slovenia) Maja Matevžič / (Slovenia) Katarina Srebotnik, 6–0, 5–7, 7–5

== Notes ==
Preceded by 1997 Australian Open	Grand Slams	Succeeded by 1997 Wimbledon Championships
