= 2000 Idea Prokom Open – Doubles =

Doubles
- 2000 Idea Prokom Open

Final
- Champions: (Spain) Virginia Ruano Pascual (Argentina) Paola Suárez
- Runners-up: (Sweden) Åsa Carlsson (Spain) Rita Grande
- Score: 7–5, 6–1

Details
- Draw: 16 (1WC/1Q)
- Seeds: 4

Events
Singles	Doubles
- Orange Warsaw Open

In the doubles matches of the 2000 Idea Prokom Open, Laura Montalvo and Paola Suárez were the defending champions, but competed this year with different partners.

Montalvo teamed up with Gala León García and were eliminated in quarterfinals.

Suárez teamed up with Virginia Ruano Pascual and successfully defended her title, by defeating Åsa Carlsson and Rita Grande 7–5, 6–1 in the final.

== Seeds ==
1. (Spain) Virginia Ruano Pascual / (Argentina) Paola Suárez (champions)
2. (Spain) Conchita Martínez / (Argentina) Patricia Tarabini (quarterfinals)
3. (Sweden) Åsa Carlsson / (Italy) Rita Grande (final)
4. (Italy) Silvia Farina / (Slovakia) Karina Habšudová (quarterfinals)

== Draw ==
Key

- Q = Qualifier
- WC = Wild card
- LL = Lucky loser
- Alt = Alternate
- ITF = ITF entry
- PR = Protected ranking
- SR = Special ranking
- SE = Special exempt
- JE = Junior exempt
- JR = Junior Accelerator Programme entrant
- CO = College Accelerator Programme entrant
- NG = Next Gen Accelerator Program entrant
- w/o = Walkover
- r = Retired
- d = Defaulted

=== Draw ===
First round
1	(Spain) V Ruano Pascual (Argentina) P Suárez	7^{7}	6
Q	(Czech Republic) D Bedáňová (Russia) E Bovina	6^{2}	3
(Spain) G León García (Argentina) L Montalvo	6	6
(Belarus) N Ostrovskaya (Czech Republic) M Paštiková	2	1
4	(Italy) S Farina (Slovakia) K Habšudová	6	3	6
(Czech Republic) K Hrdličková (Switzerland) P Schnyder	4	6	3
(Bulgaria) M Maleeva (Russia) N Petrova	6	6
(Slovakia) Ľ Cervanová (Czech Republic) H Vildová	0	2
WC	(Czech Republic) L Průšová (Poland) A Żarska	2	5
(Italy) T Garbin (Slovakia) J Husárová	6	7
(Germany) A Barna (Argentina) M Díaz Oliva	2	4
3	(Sweden) Å Carlsson (Italy) R Grande	6	6
(South Africa) J Kruger (Austria) M Maruska	6	6
(Federal Republic of Yugoslavia) S Načuk (Slovenia) P Rampre	1	2
(Russia) A Myskina (Slovakia) H Nagyová	4	5
2	(Spain) C Martínez (Argentina) P Tarabini	6	7

Quarterfinals
1	(Spain) V Ruano Pascual (Argentina) P Suárez	6	6
(Spain) G León García (Argentina) L Montalvo	1	1
4	(Italy) S Farina (Slovakia) K Habšudová	5	6^{2}
(Bulgaria) M Maleeva (Russia) N Petrova	7	7^{7}
(Italy) T Garbin (Slovakia) J Husárová	6^{5}	3
3	(Sweden) Å Carlsson (Italy) R Grande	7^{7}	6
(South Africa) J Kruger (Austria) M Maruska	6	3	6
2	(Spain) C Martínez (Argentina) P Tarabini	3	6	4

Semifinals
1	(Spain) V Ruano Pascual (Argentina) P Suárez	6	6
(Bulgaria) M Maleeva (Russia) N Petrova	1	1
3	(Sweden) Å Carlsson (Italy) R Grande	6	3	7
(South Africa) J Kruger (Austria) M Maruska	3	6	5

Final
1	(Spain) V Ruano Pascual (Argentina) P Suárez	7	6
3	(Sweden) Å Carlsson (Italy) R Grande	5	1

== Qualifying ==
=== Qualifying seeds ===
The top seed received a bye to the second round.

1. (France) Karolina Jagieniak / (Poland) Katarzyna Strączy (second round)
2. (Latvia) Līga Dekmeijere / (Poland) Agata Kurowska (first round)

=== Qualifiers ===
1. (Czech Republic) Dája Bedáňová / (Russia) Elena Bovina

=== Qualifying draw ===
First round
(Germany) Adriana Jerabek (Russia) Daria Panova	8
(Poland) Monika Krauze (Poland) Joanna Sakowicz	5
(Czech Republic) Dája Bedáňová (Russia) Elena Bovina	8
WC	(Poland) Anna Rynarzewska (Poland) Monika Schneider	5
(Poland) Patrycja Bandurowska (Poland) Agata Cioroch	8
2	(Latvia) Līga Dekmeijere (Poland) Agata Kurowska	5

Second round
1	(France) Karolina Jagieniak (Poland) Katarzyna Strączy	8^{11}
(Germany) Adriana Jerabek (Russia) Daria Panova	9^{13}
(Czech Republic) Dája Bedáňová (Russia) Elena Bovina	8
(Poland) Patrycja Bandurowska (Poland) Agata Cioroch	4

Qualifying competition
(Germany) Adriana Jerabek (Russia) Daria Panova	4	3
(Czech Republic) Dája Bedáňová (Russia) Elena Bovina	6	6
