= 2001 Idea Prokom Open – Women's singles =

Women's singles
- 2001 Idea Prokom Open

Final
- Champion: (Spain) Cristina Torrens Valero
- Runner-up: (Spain) Gala León García
- Score: 6–2, 6–2

Details
- Draw: 30
- Seeds: 8

Events
Singles	men	women
Doubles	men	women
← 2000 ·	Idea Prokom Open	· 2002 →

Anke Huber was the defending champion, but lost in quarterfinals to Gala León García.

Cristina Torrens Valero won the title by defeating Gala León García 6–2, 6–2 in the final.

== Seeds ==
The first two seeds received a bye into the second round.

1. (Germany) Anke Huber (quarterfinals)
2. (Italy) Silvia Farina Elia (semifinals)
3. (Federal Republic of Yugoslavia) Jelena Dokic (semifinals)
4. (Slovakia) Henrieta Nagyová (quarterfinals)
5. (Spain) Ángeles Montolio (second round)
6. (Italy) Francesca Schiavone (second round)
7. (Russia) Lina Krasnoroutskaya (second round)
8. (Argentina) Mariana Díaz Oliva (quarterfinals)

== Draw ==
=== Key ===
- Q = Qualifier
- WC = Wild card
- LL = Lucky loser
- Alt = Alternate
- ITF = ITF entry
- PR = Protected ranking
- SR = Special ranking
- SE = Special exempt
- JE = Junior exempt
- JR = Junior Accelerator Programme entrant
- CO = College Accelerator Programme entrant
- NG = Next Gen Accelerator Program entrant
- w/o = Walkover
- r = Retired
- d = Defaulted

=== Finals ===
Semifinals
(Spain) Gala León García	6	6
3	(Federal Republic of Yugoslavia) Jelena Dokic	2	4
(Spain) Cristina Torrens Valero	6	6
2	(Italy) Silvia Farina Elia	2	3

Final
(Spain) Gala León García	2	2
(Spain) Cristina Torrens Valero	6	6

=== Top half ===
First round
(Israel) A Smashnova	1	7	6
(Romania) R Dragomir Ilie	6	5	2
(Germany) A Glass	0	6	2
(Spain) G León García	6	2	6
Q	(Czech Republic) J Hlaváčková	7^{7}	4	1
5	(Spain) Á Montolio	6^{4}	6	6
3	(Federal Republic of Yugoslavia) J Dokic	6	6
(Italy) T Garbin	1	1
(Czech Republic) K Hrdličková	5	6	7^{7}
WC	(Poland) J Sakowicz	7	3	6^{2}
(Czech Republic) A Gerši	3	7	6
(Slovakia) J Husárová	6	5	1
Q	(Russia) A Rodionova	7	2	3
8	(Argentina) M Díaz Oliva	5	6	6

Second round
1	(Germany) A Huber	6	7^{7}
(Israel) A Smashnova	4	6^{4}
(Spain) G León García	1	6	6
5	(Spain) Á Montolio	6	4	1
3	(Federal Republic of Yugoslavia) J Dokic	6	6
(Czech Republic) K Hrdličková	3	2
(Czech Republic) A Gerši	5	3
8	(Argentina) M Díaz Oliva	7	6

Quarterfinals
1	(Germany) A Huber	3	5
(Spain) G León García	6	7
3	(Federal Republic of Yugoslavia) J Dokic	6	6
8	(Argentina) M Díaz Oliva	3	3

Semifinals
(Spain) G León García	6	6
3	(Federal Republic of Yugoslavia) J Dokic	2	4

=== Bottom half ===
First round
6	(Italy) F Schiavone	4	7	6
Q	(Ukraine) J Vakulenko	6	5	3
(Hungary) R Kuti-Kis	3	4
(Spain) C Torrens Valero	6	6
WC	(France) K Jagieniak	3	0
(Germany) B Rittner	6	6
(Paraguay) R de los Ríos	3	3
4	(Slovakia) H Nagyová	6	6
7	(Russia) L Krasnoroutskaya	6	6
Q	(Czech Republic) Z Ondrášková	1	4
(Belarus) T Poutchek	3	6	6
(South Africa) J Kruger	6	0	4
(Spain) V Ruano Pascual	5	4
(Spain) A Medina Garrigues	7	6

Second round
6	(Italy) F Schiavone	4	6^{3}
(Spain) C Torrens Valero	6	7^{7}
(Germany) B Rittner	5	6	2
4	(Slovakia) H Nagyová	7	4	6
7	(Russia) L Krasnoroutskaya	2	6	2
(Belarus) T Poutchek	6	4	6
(Spain) A Medina Garrigues	4	6	5
2	(Italy) S Farina Elia	6	0	7

Quarterfinals
(Spain) C Torrens Valero	1	6	6
4	(Slovakia) H Nagyová	6	0	3
(Belarus) T Poutchek	4	3
2	(Italy) S Farina Elia	6	6

Semifinals
(Spain) C Torrens Valero	6	6
2	(Italy) S Farina Elia	2	3
