= 2004 Idea Prokom Open – Men's singles =

Men's singles
- 2004 Idea Prokom Open

Final
- Champion: (Spain) Rafael Nadal
- Runner-up: (Argentina) José Acasuso
- Score: 6–3, 6–4

Events
Singles	men	women
Doubles	men	women
← 2003 ·	Idea Prokom Open	· 2005 →

Rafael Nadal defeated José Acasuso in the final, 6–3, 6–4 to win the Singles title at the 2004 Idea Prokom Open. It was his first career title.

Guillermo Coria was the reigning champion, but did not participate.

== Seeds ==
1. (Russia) Marat Safin (second round)
2. (Russia) Nikolay Davydenko (first round)
3. (Spain) David Ferrer (second round)
4. (Russia) Igor Andreev (first round)
5. (Spain) Alberto Martín (first round)
6. (Spain) Rafael Nadal (champion)
7. (Spain) Albert Montañés (first round)
8. (France) Paul-Henri Mathieu (first round)

== Draw ==
=== Key ===
- Q = Qualifier
- WC = Wild card
- LL = Lucky loser
- Alt = Alternate
- ITF = ITF entry
- PR = Protected ranking
- SR = Special ranking
- SE = Special exempt
- JE = Junior exempt
- JR = Junior Accelerator Programme entrant
- CO = College Accelerator Programme entrant
- NG = Next Gen Accelerator Program entrant
- w/o = Walkover
- r = Retired
- d = Defaulted

=== Finals ===
Semifinals
(Argentina) Juan Mónaco	4	2
(Argentina) José Acasuso	6	6
6	(Spain) Rafael Nadal	7	6
Q	(Spain) Félix Mantilla	5	1

Final
(Argentina) José Acasuso	3	4
6	(Spain) Rafael Nadal	6	6

=== Top half ===
First round
1	(Russia) M Safin	7	6
(Spain) G Blanco	5	2
(Spain) M López	7	6
(Spain) Ó Hernández	5	2
WC	(Poland) F Urban	4	6^{6}
(Switzerland) M Rosset	6	7^{8}
(Argentina) J Mónaco	6^{13}	7	6
5	(Spain) A Martín	7^{15}	5	3
3	(Spain) D Ferrer	6	6
Q	(Spain) G García-López	4	3
WC	(Poland) M Przysiężny	5	4
(Argentina) J Acasuso	7	6
(Czech Republic) B Ulihrach	6	2	6^{5}
Q	(Czech Republic) J Vaněk	2	6	7^{7}
(Austria) S Koubek	3	6	6
8	(France) P-H Mathieu	6	1	3

Second round
1	(Russia) M Safin	3	2
(Spain) M López	6	6
(Switzerland) M Rosset	4	3
(Argentina) J Mónaco	6	6
3	(Spain) D Ferrer	4	6^{4}
(Argentina) J Acasuso	6	7^{7}
Q	(Czech Republic) J Vaněk	6	6
(Austria) S Koubek	4	4

Quarterfinals
(Spain) M López	3	6	6^{6}
(Argentina) J Mónaco	6	2	7^{8}
(Argentina) J Acasuso	3	6	6
Q	(Czech Republic) J Vaněk	6	3	2

Semifinals
(Argentina) J Mónaco	4	2
(Argentina) J Acasuso	6	6

=== Bottom half ===
First round
6	(Spain) R Nadal	6	6
(Romania) V Hănescu	4	4
(Spain) Á Calatrava	4	6	4
PR	(France) A Di Pasquale	6	3	6
(Czech Republic) T Zíb	4	2
Q	(Argentina) F Squillari	6	6
WC	(Poland) Ł Kubot	6	6
4	(Russia) I Andreev	4	2
7	(Spain) A Montañés	0	2
Q	(Spain) F Mantilla	6	6
(Spain) A Portas	6	6
(Argentina) M Vassallo Argüello	1	2
(France) O Mutis	6	6
(Spain) R Ramírez Hidalgo	4	3
(Chile) A García	3	7^{7}	6
2	(Russia) N Davydenko	6	6^{5}	4

Second round
6	(Spain) R Nadal	6	6
PR	(France) A Di Pasquale	2	4
Q	(Argentina) F Squillari	6	6
WC	(Poland) Ł Kubot	2	3
Q	(Spain) F Mantilla	5	7	7
(Spain) A Portas	7	5	5
(France) O Mutis	2	6^{9}
(Chile) A García	6	7^{11}

Quarterfinals
6	(Spain) R Nadal	6	6
Q	(Argentina) F Squillari	3	4
Q	(Spain) F Mantilla	6	6
(Chile) A García	3	3

Semifinals
6	(Spain) R Nadal	7	6
Q	(Spain) F Mantilla	5	1
