= 2001 Idea Prokom Open – Women's doubles =

Women's doubles
- 2001 Idea Prokom Open

Final
- Champions: (South Africa) Joannette Kruger (Italy) Francesca Schiavone
- Runners-up: (Ukraine) Yuliya Beygelzimer (Russia) Anastasia Rodionova
- Score: 6–4, 6–0

Details
- Draw: 16
- Seeds: 4

Events
Singles	men	women
Doubles	men	women
← 2000 ·	Idea Prokom Open	· 2002 →

Virginia Ruano Pascual and Paola Suárez were the defending champions, but none competed this year. Ruano Pascual decided to focus on the singles tournament, while Suárez decided to rest after competing in the World Group play-offs of the Fed Cup.

Joannette Kruger and Francesca Schiavone won the title by defeating Yuliya Beygelzimer and Anastasia Rodionova 6–4, 6–0 in the final.

This tournament saw an unusual event, as all seeded pairs were eliminated in the first round.

== Seeds ==
1. (Italy) Tathiana Garbin / (Slovakia) Janette Husárová (first round)
2. (Federal Republic of Yugoslavia) Jelena Dokic / (Italy) Silvia Farina Elia (first round)
3. (Spain) Anabel Medina Garrigues / (Spain) Cristina Torrens Valero (first round)
4. (Germany) ~~Andrea Glass~~ / (Belarus) ~~Tatiana Poutchek~~ (withdrew)

== Draw ==
=== Key ===
- Q = Qualifier
- WC = Wild card
- LL = Lucky loser
- Alt = Alternate
- ITF = ITF entry
- PR = Protected ranking
- SR = Special ranking
- SE = Special exempt
- JE = Junior exempt
- JR = Junior Accelerator Programme entrant
- CO = College Accelerator Programme entrant
- NG = Next Gen Accelerator Program entrant
- w/o = Walkover
- r = Retired
- d = Defaulted

=== Draw ===
First round
1	(Italy) T Garbin (Slovakia) J Husárová	4	3
(Ukraine) Y Beygelzimer (Russia) A Rodionova	6	6
WC	(Poland) K Jans (Poland) J Sakowicz	1	1
(Paraguay) R de los Ríos (Argentina) M Díaz Oliva	6	6
4	(Germany) A Glass (Belarus) T Poutchek
(Germany) A Roesch (Czech Republic) H Šromová	w/o
(Australia) J Hewitt (Germany) J Schruff	2	0
(Germany) M Kučerová (Poland) A Żarska	6	6
Q	(Poland) Karolina Bulat (Russia) Daria Panova	3	3
(France) S Foretz (Germany) C Schneider	6	6
(South Africa) J Kruger (Italy) F Schiavone	7	6
3	(Spain) A Medina Garrigues (Spain) C Torrens Valero	5	1
(Poland) Anną Dolińską (Poland) Agata Kurowska	1	1
(Germany) G Arn (Croatia) M Palaveršić	6	6
(Romania) R Dragomir Ilie (Romania) A Vanc	6^{5}	6	6
2	(Federal Republic of Yugoslavia) J Dokic (Italy) S Farina Elia	7^{7}	4	4

Quarterfinals
(Ukraine) Y Beygelzimer (Russia) A Rodionova	6	7
(Paraguay) R de los Ríos (Argentina) M Díaz Oliva	3	5
(Germany) A Roesch (Czech Republic) H Šromová	6	4	5
(Germany) M Kučerová (Poland) A Żarska	3	6	7
(France) S Foretz (Germany) C Schneider	4	3
(South Africa) J Kruger (Italy) F Schiavone	6	6
(Germany) G Arn (Croatia) M Palaveršić	7^{7}	2	4
(Romania) R Dragomir Ilie (Romania) A Vanc	6^{5}	6	6

Semifinals
(Ukraine) Y Beygelzimer (Russia) A Rodionova	6	4	7
(Germany) M Kučerová (Poland) A Żarska	3	6	5
(South Africa) J Kruger (Italy) F Schiavone	6	2	6
(Romania) R Dragomir Ilie (Romania) A Vanc	3	6	2

Final
(Ukraine) Y Beygelzimer (Russia) A Rodionova	4	0
(South Africa) J Kruger (Italy) F Schiavone	6	6
