= 2003 Idea Prokom Open – Women's doubles =

Women's doubles
- 2003 Idea Prokom Open

Final
- Champions: (Ukraine) Tatiana Perebiynis (Croatia) Silvija Talaja
- Runners-up: (Estonia) Maret Ani (Czech Republic) Libuše Průšová
- Score: 6–4, 6–2

Events
Singles	men	women
Doubles	men	women
← 2002 ·	Orange Warsaw Open	· 2004 →

Svetlana Kuznetsova and Arantxa Sánchez Vicario were the defending champions, but none competed this year.

Tatiana Perebiynis and Silvija Talaja won the title by defeating qualifiers Maret Ani and Libuše Průšová 6–4, 6–2 in the final.

== Seeds ==
1. (Hungary) Petra Mandula / (Austria) Patricia Wartusch (first round)
2. (Slovenia) Maja Matevžič / (Slovakia) Henrieta Nagyová (first round)
3. (Croatia) Jelena Kostanić / (Czech Republic) Renata Voráčová (quarterfinals)
4. (Russia) Anastasia Myskina / (Uzbekistan) Iroda Tulyaganova (first round)

== Draw ==
=== Key ===
- Q = Qualifier
- WC = Wild card
- LL = Lucky loser
- Alt = Alternate
- SE = Special exempt
- PR = Protected ranking
- ITF = ITF entry
- JE = Junior exempt
- w/o = Walkover
- r = Retired
- d = Defaulted
- SR = Special ranking

=== Draw ===
First round
1	(Hungary) P Mandula (Austria) P Wartusch	5	5
(Argentina) C Fernández (Russia) E Kulikovskaya	7	7
(Czech Republic) G Navrátilová (Czech Republic) M Paštiková	6	6
(Republic of Ireland) K Liggan (Italy) An Serra Zanetti	4	2
4	(Russia) A Myskina (Uzbekistan) I Tulyaganova	3	6	0
Q	(Estonia) M Ani (Czech Republic) L Průšová	6	2	6
(Switzerland) M Casanova (Russia) D Safina	6	4	2
(Spain) A Medina Garrigues (Germany) A Rösch	2	6	6
WC	(Poland) M Domachowska (Poland) Monika Krauze	1	2
(France) S Cohen-Aloro (France) C Dhenin	6	6
(United States) L Osterloh (Germany) C Schneider	6	4	3
3	(Croatia) J Kostanić (Czech Republic) R Voráčová	4	6	6
(Ukraine) Y Fedak (Belarus) N Ostrovskaya	3	3
(Ukraine) Y Beygelzimer (Belarus) T Poutchek	6	6
(Ukraine) T Perebiynis (Croatia) S Talaja	7^{8}	3	6
2	(Slovenia) M Matevžič (Slovakia) H Nagyová	6^{6}	6	3

Quarterfinals
(Argentina) C Fernández (Russia) E Kulikovskaya	3	6	0
(Czech Republic) G Navrátilová (Czech Republic) M Paštiková	6	1	6
Q	(Estonia) M Ani (Czech Republic) L Průšová	3	7^{9}	6
(Spain) A Medina Garrigues (Germany) A Rösch	6	6^{7}	1
(France) S Cohen-Aloro (France) C Dhenin	2	7^{7}	6
3	(Croatia) J Kostanić (Czech Republic) R Voráčová	6	6^{5}	2
(Ukraine) Y Beygelzimer (Belarus) T Poutchek	6^{6}	3
(Ukraine) T Perebiynis (Croatia) S Talaja	7^{8}	6

Semifinals
(Czech Republic) G Navrátilová (Czech Republic) M Paštiková	4	0
Q	(Estonia) M Ani (Czech Republic) L Průšová	6	6
(France) S Cohen-Aloro (France) C Dhenin	3	6	4
(Ukraine) T Perebiynis (Croatia) S Talaja	6	4	6

Final
Q	(Estonia) M Ani (Czech Republic) L Průšová	4	2
(Ukraine) T Perebiynis (Croatia) S Talaja	6	6
