= 2001 Idea Prokom Open =

- Date: 23–29 July
- Edition: 1st (men) / 4th (women)
- Category: International Series (men); Tier III (women)
- Surface: Clay / outdoors
- Location: Sopot, Poland

Champions

Men's singles
- (Spain) Tommy Robredo

Women's singles
- (Spain) Cristina Torrens Valero

Men's doubles
- (Australia) Paul Hanley / (Australia) Nathan Healey

Women's doubles
- (South Africa) Joannette Kruger / (Italy) Francesca Schiavone
← 2000 ·	Idea Prokom Open	· 2002 →

The 2001 Idea Prokom Open was a combined men's and women's tennis tournament played on outdoor clay courts in Sopot in Poland that was part of the International Series of the 2001 ATP Tour and of Tier III of the 2001 WTA Tour. The tournament ran from 23 July through 29 July 2001. Tommy Robredo and Cristina Torrens Valero won the singles titles.

== Finals ==
=== Men's singles ===
(Spain) Tommy Robredo defeated (Spain) Albert Portas 1–6, 7–5, 7–6 (7–2)

- It was Robredo's only title of the year and the 1st of his career.

=== Women's singles ===
(Spain) Cristina Torrens Valero defeated (Spain) Gala León García 6–2, 6–2

- It was Torrens Valero's only title of the year and the 4th of her career.

=== Men's doubles ===
(Australia) Paul Hanley / (Australia) Nathan Healey defeated (Georgia (country)) Irakli Labadze / (Hungary) Attila Sávolt 7–6 (12–10), 6–2

- It was Hanley's only title of the year and the 1st of his career. It was Healey's only title of the year and the 1st of his career.

=== Women's doubles ===
(South Africa) Joannette Kruger / (Italy) Francesca Schiavone defeated (Ukraine) Yulia Beygelzimer / (Russia) Anastasia Rodionova 6–4, 6–0

- It was Kruger's only title of the year and the 3rd of her career. It was Schiavone's only title of the year and the 1st of her career.
