= 2000 Idea Prokom Open – Singles =

Singles
- 2000 Idea Prokom Open

Final
- Champion: (Germany) Anke Huber
- Runner-up: (Spain) Gala León García
- Score: 7–6^{(7–4)}, 6–3

Details
- Draw: 30 (2WC/4Q/1LL)
- Seeds: 8

Events
Singles	Doubles
- Orange Warsaw Open

Conchita Martínez was the defending champion, but was forced to retire in her quarterfinals match against Gala León García.

Anke Huber won the title by defeating Gala León García 7–6^{(7–4)}, 6–3 in the final.

== Seeds ==
The first two seeds received a bye into the second round.

1. (Spain) Conchita Martínez (quarterfinals, retired)
2. (Germany) Anke Huber (champion)
3. (Austria) Barbara Schett (quarterfinals)
4. (Switzerland) Patty Schnyder (quarterfinals)
5. (Spain) Gala León García (final)
6. (Czech Republic) Denisa Chládková (first round)
7. (Sweden) Åsa Carlsson (second round)
8. (Russia) Anastasia Myskina (semifinals)

== Draw ==
Key

- Q = Qualifier
- WC = Wild card
- LL = Lucky loser
- Alt = Alternate
- ITF = ITF entry
- PR = Protected ranking
- SR = Special ranking
- SE = Special exempt
- JE = Junior exempt
- JR = Junior Accelerator Programme entrant
- CO = College Accelerator Programme entrant
- NG = Next Gen Accelerator Program entrant
- w/o = Walkover
- r = Retired
- d = Defaulted

=== Finals ===
Semifinals
5	(Spain) Gala León García	6	4	6
(Argentina) Paola Suárez	4	6	3
8	(Russia) Anastasia Myskina	3	2
2	(Germany) Anke Huber	6	6

Final
5	(Spain) Gala León García	6^{4}	3
2	(Germany) Anke Huber	7^{7}	6

=== Top half ===
First round
(Bulgaria) M Maleeva	6	6
WC	(France) K Jagieniak	3	2
(Italy) R Grande	6	7^{7}
Q	(Russia) E Bovina	3	6^{3}
WC	(Poland) A Żarska	1	0
5	(Spain) G León García	6	6
4	(Switzerland) P Schnyder	6	5	6
LL	(Federal Republic of Yugoslavia) S Načuk	2	7	3
(Czech Republic) A Gerši	6^{9}	1
(Italy) S Farina	7^{11}	6
(Slovakia) H Nagyová	6	3	2
(Argentina) P Suárez	4	6	6
Q	(Slovakia) Ľ Cervanová	2	3
7	(Sweden) Å Carlsson	6	6

Second round
1	(Spain) C Martínez	3	6	6
(Bulgaria) M Maleeva	6	2	4
(Italy) R Grande	7^{8}	2	3
5	(Spain) G León García	6^{6}	6	6
4	(Switzerland) P Schnyder	4	6	6
(Italy) S Farina	6	2	2
(Argentina) P Suárez	6	6
7	(Sweden) Å Carlsson	2	2

Quarterfinals
1	(Spain) C Martínez	2^{r}
5	(Spain) G León García	5
4	(Switzerland) P Schnyder	4	5
(Argentina) P Suárez	6	7

Semifinals
5	(Spain) G León García	6	4	6
(Argentina) P Suárez	4	6	3

=== Bottom half ===
First round
8	(Russia) A Myskina	6	5	6
(Austria) S Plischke	3	7	1
Q	(Czech Republic) D Bedáňová	7	3	6
(Russia) N Petrova	5	6	1
(South Africa) J Kruger	6	5	3
(Poland) M Grzybowska	2	7	6
(Slovakia) K Habšudová	0	4
3	(Austria) B Schett	6	6
6	(Czech Republic) D Chládková	5	3
(Czech Republic) K Hrdličková	7	6
Q	(Czech Republic) L Průšová	4	3
(Spain) V Ruano Pascual	6	6
(Slovenia) T Pisnik	3	2
(Italy) T Garbin	6	6

Second round
8	(Russia) A Myskina	2	6	6
Q	(Czech Republic) D Bedáňová	6	0	1
(Poland) M Grzybowska	4	3
3	(Austria) B Schett	6	6
(Czech Republic) K Hrdličková	6	6
(Spain) V Ruano Pascual	4	3
(Italy) T Garbin	3	3
2	(Germany) A Huber	6	6

Quarterfinals
8	(Russia) A Myskina	5	6	6
3	(Austria) B Schett	7	1	1
(Czech Republic) K Hrdličková	7^{7}	1	1
2	(Germany) A Huber	6^{5}	6	6

Semifinals
8	(Russia) A Myskina	3	2
2	(Germany) A Huber	6	6

== Qualifying ==
=== Qualifying seeds ===
1. (Federal Republic of Yugoslavia) Sandra Načuk (qualifying competition, lucky loser)
2. (Belarus) Nadejda Ostrovskaya (second round)
3. (Czech Republic) Dája Bedáňová (qualified)
4. (Slovakia) Ľudmila Cervanová (qualified)
5. (Germany) Anca Barna (first round)
6. (Russia) Elena Bovina (qualified)
7. (Austria) Marion Maruska (qualifying competition)
8. (Argentina) Mariana Díaz Oliva (second round)

=== Qualifiers ===
1. (Czech Republic) Libuše Průšová
2. (Czech Republic) Dája Bedáňová
3. (Slovakia) Ľudmila Cervanová
4. (Russia) Elena Bovina

=== Lucky loser ===
1. (Federal Republic of Yugoslavia) Sandra Načuk

=== Qualifying draw ===
==== First qualifier ====
First round
1	(Federal Republic of Yugoslavia) Sandra Načuk	6	6
WC	(Poland) Monika Schneider	2	2
(Germany) Adriana Jerabek	6	6
(Poland) Joanna Sakowicz	2	4
(Poland) Patrycja Bandurowska	4	1
(Latvia) Līga Dekmeijere	6	6
(Czech Republic) Libuše Průšová	6	6
5	(Germany) Anca Barna	4	4

Second round
1	(Federal Republic of Yugoslavia) Sandra Načuk	7^{7}	6
(Germany) Adriana Jerabek	6^{2}	0
(Latvia) Līga Dekmeijere	1	1
(Czech Republic) Libuše Průšová	6	6

Qualifying competition
1	(Federal Republic of Yugoslavia) Sandra Načuk	2	3
(Czech Republic) Libuše Průšová	6	6

==== Second qualifier ====
First round
3	(Czech Republic) Dája Bedáňová	7^{9}	6
(Russia) Daria Panova	6^{7}	2
(Germany) Sabine Klaschka	3	6	6
WC	(Poland) Anna Rynarzewska	6	4	4
(Czech Republic) Michaela Paštiková	2	4
(Czech Republic) Klára Koukalová	6	6
(Poland) Katarzyna Strączy	2	4
8	(Argentina) Mariana Díaz Oliva	6	6

Second round
3	(Czech Republic) Dája Bedáňová	6	6
(Germany) Sabine Klaschka	3	2
(Czech Republic) Klára Koukalová	6	4	7
8	(Argentina) Mariana Díaz Oliva	3	6	5

Qualifying competition
3	(Czech Republic) Dája Bedáňová	6	3	6
(Czech Republic) Klára Koukalová	3	6	4

==== Third qualifier ====
First round
7	(Austria) Marion Maruska	6	6
(Czech Republic) Helena Vildová	0	2
WC	(Poland) Klaudia Jans	6	6
(Austria) Karin Kschwendt	4	1
(Bulgaria) Desislava Topalova	6^{0}	1
(Romania) Oana Elena Golimbioschi	7^{7}	6
(Poland) Magdalena Marszałek	1	6	1
4	(Slovakia) Ľudmila Cervanová	6	4	6

Second round
7	(Austria) Marion Maruska	5	6	6
WC	(Poland) Klaudia Jans	7	4	2
(Romania) Oana Elena Golimbioschi	2	2
4	(Slovakia) Ľudmila Cervanová	6	6

Qualifying competition
7	(Austria) Marion Maruska	7	3	6^{7}
4	(Slovakia) Ľudmila Cervanová	5	6	7^{9}

==== Fourth qualifier ====
First round
6	(Russia) Elena Bovina	5	6	6
WC	(Poland) Monika Krauze	7	4	3
(Poland) Agata Cioroch	6	6
(Poland) Agata Kurowska	3	1
(Czech Republic) Gabriela Navrátilová	4	1
(Slovenia) Petra Rampre	6	6
(Germany) Martina Müller	4	2
2	(Belarus) Nadejda Ostrovskaya	6	6

Second round
6	(Russia) Elena Bovina	6	7^{7}
(Poland) Agata Cioroch	4	6^{5}
(Slovenia) Petra Rampre	6	6
2	(Belarus) Nadejda Ostrovskaya	3	3

Qualifying competition
6	(Russia) Elena Bovina	4	6	6
(Slovenia) Petra Rampre	6	2	2
