= 2002 Idea Prokom Open – Women's singles =

Women's singles
- 2002 Idea Prokom Open

Final
- Champion: (Russia) Dinara Safina
- Runner-up: (Slovakia) Henrieta Nagyová
- Score: 6–3, 4–0, retired

Details
- Draw: 30
- Seeds: 8

Events
Singles	men	women
Doubles	men	women
← 2001 ·	Idea Prokom Open	· 2003 →

Cristina Torrens Valero was the defending champion, but lost in first round to Joanna Sakowicz.

Dinara Safina won the title against Henrieta Nagyová. Safina was leading 6–3, 4–0 when Nagyová was forced to retire.

== Seeds ==
The first two seeds received a bye into the second round.

1. (Italy) Silvia Farina Elia (second round)
2. (Switzerland) Patty Schnyder (second round)
3. (Spain) Arantxa Sánchez Vicario (quarterfinals)
4. (Slovakia) Martina Suchá (second round)
5. (Spain) Cristina Torrens Valero (first round)
6. (Slovakia) Henrieta Nagyová (final, retired)
7. (Slovenia) Maja Matevžič (first round)
8. (Spain) Magüi Serna (quarterfinals)

== Draw ==
=== Key ===
- Q = Qualifier
- WC = Wild card
- LL = Lucky loser
- Alt = Alternate
- ITF = ITF entry
- PR = Protected ranking
- SR = Special ranking
- SE = Special exempt
- JE = Junior exempt
- JR = Junior Accelerator Programme entrant
- CO = College Accelerator Programme entrant
- NG = Next Gen Accelerator Program entrant
- w/o = Walkover
- r = Retired
- d = Defaulted

=== Finals ===
Semifinals
6	(Slovakia) Henrieta Nagyová	2	7	7^{7}
(Italy) Tathiana Garbin	6	5	6^{2}
(Russia) Vera Zvonareva	3	2
Q	(Russia) Dinara Safina	6	6

Final
6	(Slovakia) Henrieta Nagyová	3	0^{r}
Q	(Russia) Dinara Safina	6	4

=== Top half ===
First round
(Germany) B Rittner	6	0	6
(Spain) G León García	2	6	3
WC	(Poland) M Grzybowska	2	6	3
(Germany) A Barna	6	4	6
(Russia) E Kulikovskaya	6	6^{3}	1
6	(Slovakia) H Nagyová	4	7^{7}	6
3	(Spain) A Sánchez Vicario	6	6
(Spain) M Marrero	3	1
(Croatia) J Kostanić	2	6	6^{2}
Q	(Russia) M Goloviznina	6	2	7^{7}
(Italy) T Garbin	6	6
(Germany) M Müller	4	3
WC	(Poland) J Sakowicz	6	7^{10}
5	(Spain) C Torrens Valero	2	6^{8}

Second round
1	(Italy) S Farina Elia	4	6	3
(Germany) B Rittner	6	2	6
(Germany) A Barna	4	2
6	(Slovakia) H Nagyová	6	6
3	(Spain) A Sánchez Vicario	7	6
Q	(Russia) M Goloviznina	5	2
(Italy) T Garbin	6	6
WC	(Poland) J Sakowicz	4	2

Quarterfinals
(Germany) B Rittner	5	5
6	(Slovakia) H Nagyová	7	7
3	(Spain) A Sánchez Vicario	1	1
(Italy) T Garbin	6	6

Semifinals
6	(Slovakia) H Nagyová	2	7	7^{7}
(Italy) T Garbin	6	5	6^{2}

=== Bottom half ===
First round
7	(Slovenia) M Matevžič	3	2
(Russia) V Zvonareva	6	6
(Belarus) T Poutchek	5	3
Q	(Italy) F Pennetta	7	6
Q	(Russia) S Kuznetsova	2	7^{9}	1
(Spain) V Ruano Pascual	6	6^{7}	6
(Spain) Á Montolio	6	6^{4}	3
4	(Slovakia) M Suchá	1	7^{7}	6
8	(Spain) M Serna	6	2	6
(Croatia) S Talaja	0	6	2
LL	(Germany) J Kandarr	7	6
WC	(Argentina) M Díaz Oliva	5	4
(Sweden) Å Svensson	3	1
Q	(Russia) D Safina	6	6

Second round
(Russia) V Zvonareva	6	6
Q	(Italy) F Pennetta	3	1
(Spain) V Ruano Pascual	6	6
4	(Slovakia) M Suchá	4	3
8	(Spain) M Serna	4	6	6
LL	(Germany) J Kandarr	6	2	3
Q	(Russia) D Safina	6	6
2	(Switzerland) P Schnyder	1	1

Quarterfinals
(Russia) V Zvonareva	2	6	7
(Spain) V Ruano Pascual	6	4	5
8	(Spain) M Serna	1	7	3
Q	(Russia) D Safina	6	5	6

Semifinals
(Russia) V Zvonareva	3	2
Q	(Russia) D Safina	6	6
