= 2004 Idea Prokom Open =

- Date: 9–15 August
- Edition: 7th
- Category: International Series (men); Tier III (women)
- Surface: Clay / outdoors
- Location: Sopot, Poland
- Venue: Sopocki Klub Tenisowy

Champions

Men's singles
- (Spain) Rafael Nadal

Women's singles
- (Italy) Flavia Pennetta

Men's doubles
- (Czech Republic) František Čermák / (Czech Republic) Leoš Friedl

Women's doubles
- (Spain) Nuria Llagostera Vives / (Spain) Marta Marrero
← 2003 ·	Idea Prokom Open	· 2005 →

The 2004 Idea Prokom Open was the seventh edition of the professional tennis tournament later known as the Warsaw Open. The tournament was part of the International Series of the 2004 ATP Tour and a Tier III event on the 2004 WTA Tour. It took place on outdoor clay courts in the seaside resort of Sopot, Poland from 9 August through 15 August 2004.

In the men's singles event, eighteen-year-old future world number one Rafael Nadal won his first ATP title. Future Grand Slam champion Flavia Pennetta also won her first WTA title in the women's singles event.

== Finals ==
=== Men's singles ===
(Spain) Rafael Nadal defeated (Argentina) José Acasuso, 6–3, 6–4

=== Men's doubles ===
(Czech Republic) František Čermák / (Czech Republic) Leoš Friedl defeated (Argentina) Martín García / (Argentina) Sebastián Prieto, 2–6, 6–2, 6–3

=== Women's singles ===
(Italy) Flavia Pennetta defeated (Czech Republic) Klára Zakopalová, 7–5, 3–6, 6–3

=== Women's doubles ===
(Spain) Nuria Llagostera Vives / (Spain) Marta Marrero defeated (Poland) Klaudia Jans / (Poland) Alicja Rosolska, 6–4, 6–3
