= 2003 Idea Prokom Open =

- Date: 28 July – 3 August
- Edition: 3rd (men) / 6th (women)
- Category: International Series (men); Tier III (women)
- Surface: Clay / outdoors
- Location: Sopot, Poland

Champions

Men's singles
- (Argentina) Guillermo Coria

Women's singles
- (Israel) Anna Pistolesi

Men's doubles
- (Poland) Mariusz Fyrstenberg / (Poland) Marcin Matkowski

Women's doubles
- (Ukraine) Tatiana Perebiynis / (Croatia) Silvija Talaja
← 2002 ·	Idea Prokom Open	· 2004 →

The 2003 Idea Prokom Open was a combined men's and women's tennis tournament played on outdoor clay courts in Sopot, Poland, that was part of the International Series of the 2003 ATP Tour and of Tier III of the 2003 WTA Tour. The tournament ran from 28 July through 3 August 2003. Guillermo Coria and Anna Pistolesi won the singles title.

== Finals ==
=== Men's singles ===
(Argentina) Guillermo Coria defeated (Spain) David Ferrer 7–5, 6–1

- It was Coria's 4th title of the year and the 5th of his career.

=== Women's singles ===
(Israel) Anna Pistolesi defeated (Czech Republic) Klára Koukalová 6–2, 6–0

- It was Pistolesi's 1st title of the year and the 7th of her career.

=== Men's doubles ===
(Poland) Mariusz Fyrstenberg / (Poland) Marcin Matkowski defeated (Czech Republic) František Čermák / (Czech Republic) Leoš Friedl 6–4, 6–7^{(7–9)}, 6–3

- It was Fyrstenberg's only title of the year and the 1st of his career. It was Matkowski's only title of the year and the 1st of his career.

=== Women's doubles ===
(Ukraine) Tatiana Perebiynis / (Croatia) Silvija Talaja defeated (Estonia) Maret Ani / (Czech Republic) Libuše Průšová 6–4, 6–2

- It was Perebiynis' only title of the year and the 2nd of her career. It was Talaja's only title of the year and the 3rd of her career.
