= 2003 Idea Prokom Open – Men's doubles =

Men's doubles
- 2003 Idea Prokom Open

Final
- Champions: (Poland) Mariusz Fyrstenberg (Poland) Marcin Matkowski
- Runners-up: (Czech Republic) František Čermák (Czech Republic) Leoš Friedl
- Score: 6–4, 6–7 (7–9), 6–3

Events
Singles	men	women
Doubles	men	women
← 2002 ·	Idea Prokom Open	· 2004 →

František Čermák and Leoš Friedl were the defending champions but lost in the final 6–4, 6–7 (7–9), 6–3 against Mariusz Fyrstenberg and Marcin Matkowski.

== Seeds ==
Champion seeds are indicated in bold text while text in italics indicates the round in which those seeds were eliminated.

1. (Czech Republic) František Čermák / (Czech Republic) Leoš Friedl (final)
2. (Argentina) Lucas Arnold / (Argentina) Mariano Hood (semifinals)
3. (Italy) Massimo Bertolini / (Argentina) Sebastián Prieto (first round)
4. (United States) Devin Bowen / (Australia) Ashley Fisher (first round)

== Draw ==
=== Key ===
- Q = Qualifier
- WC = Wild card
- LL = Lucky loser
- Alt = Alternate
- SE = Special exempt
- PR = Protected ranking
- ITF = ITF entry
- JE = Junior exempt
- w/o = Walkover
- r = Retired
- d = Defaulted
- SR = Special ranking

First round
1	(Czech Republic) **F Čermák** (Czech Republic) **L Friedl**	**6**	**7^{7}**
WC	(Poland) B Dąbrowski (Poland) M Golab	2	6^{2}
(Slovakia) **D Hrbatý** (Belgium) **T Vanhoudt**	**6**	**7^{7}**
(Germany) K Braasch (Switzerland) M Kratochvil	2	6^{3}
4	(United States) D Bowen (Australia) A Fisher	**6**	3	1
(Czech Republic) **B Ulihrach** (Sweden) **A Vinciguerra**	4	**6**	**6**
(Australia) T Perry (Japan) T Shimada	2	6^{1}
(Italy) **E Artoni** (Argentina) **F Browne**	**6**	**7^{7}**
(Czech Republic) **P Pála** (Czech Republic) **D Škoch**	**6**	1	**6**
(Spain) Á López Morón (Spain) R Ramírez Hidalgo	4	**6**	3
WC	(Poland) **M Fyrstenberg** (Poland) **M Matkowski**	**6**	**6**
3	(Italy) M Bertolini (Argentina) S Prieto	2	3
(Spain) **J I Carrasco** (Spain) **A Portas**	**7^{7}**	3	**6**
(Argentina) M Puerta (Argentina) A Schneiter	6^{2}	**6**	4
(Belgium) C Rochus (Hungary) A Sávolt	4	6^{4}
2	(Argentina) **L Arnold** (Argentina) **M Hood**	**6**	**7^{7}**

Quarterfinals
1	(Czech Republic) **F Čermák** (Czech Republic) **L Friedl**	3	**7^{7}**	**6**
(Slovakia) D Hrbatý (Belgium) T Vanhoudt	**6**	6^{4}	4
(Czech Republic) B Ulihrach (Sweden) A Vinciguerra	2	1
(Italy) **E Artoni** (Argentina) **F Browne**	**6**	**6**
(Czech Republic) P Pála (Czech Republic) D Škoch	**7^{9}**	2	4
WC	(Poland) **M Fyrstenberg** (Poland) **M Matkowski**	6^{7}	**6**	**6**
(Spain) J I Carrasco (Spain) A Portas	2	3
2	(Argentina) **L Arnold** (Argentina) **M Hood**	**6**	**6**

Semifinals
1	(Czech Republic) **F Čermák** (Czech Republic) **L Friedl**	**6**	2	**6**
(Italy) E Artoni (Argentina) F Browne	4	**6**	4
WC	(Poland) **M Fyrstenberg** (Poland) **M Matkowski**	**6**	**6**
2	(Argentina) L Arnold (Argentina) M Hood	3	1

Final
1	(Czech Republic) František Čermák (Czech Republic) Leoš Friedl	4	**7^{9}**	3
WC	(Poland) **Mariusz Fyrstenberg** (Poland) **Marcin Matkowski**	**6**	6^{7}	**6**
