= 2001 Idea Prokom Open – Men's doubles =

Men's doubles
- 2001 Idea Prokom Open

Final
- Champions: (Australia) Paul Hanley (Australia) Nathan Healey
- Runners-up: (Georgia (country)) Irakli Labadze (Hungary) Attila Sávolt
- Score: 7–6^{(12–10)}, 6–2

Details
- Draw: 16
- Seeds: 4

Events
Singles	men	women
Doubles	men	women
Idea Prokom Open	· 2002 →

Paul Hanley and Nathan Healey won in the final 7–6^{(12–10)}, 6–2 against Irakli Labadze and Attila Sávolt.

== Seeds ==
Champion seeds are indicated in bold text while text in italics indicates the round in which those seeds were eliminated.

1. (Czech Republic) František Čermák / (Netherlands) Sander Groen (quarterfinals)
2. (South Africa) Robbie Koenig / (The Bahamas) Mark Merklein (semifinals)
3. (Australia) Tim Crichton / (South Africa) Paul Rosner (first round)
4. (Australia) **Paul Hanley** / (Australia) **Nathan Healey (champions)**

== Draw ==
=== Key ===
- Q = Qualifier
- WC = Wild card
- LL = Lucky loser
- Alt = Alternate
- ITF = ITF entry
- PR = Protected ranking
- SR = Special ranking
- SE = Special exempt
- JE = Junior exempt
- JR = Junior Accelerator Programme entrant
- CO = College Accelerator Programme entrant
- NG = Next Gen Accelerator Program entrant
- w/o = Walkover
- r = Retired
- d = Defaulted

First round
1	(Czech Republic) **F Čermák** (Netherlands) **S Groen**	**6**	**6**
(Australia) J Kerr (Australia) G Silcock	4	3
(Spain) **A Portas** (Spain) **T Robredo**	**7**	**7^{7}**
(Czech Republic) P Kovačka (Czech Republic) P Kudrnáč	5	6^{2}
3	(Australia) T Crichton (South Africa) P Rosner	4	5
(Kazakhstan) **Y Schukin** (Czech Republic) **D Škoch**	**6**	**7**
(Georgia (country)) **I Labadze** (Hungary) **A Sávolt**	**6**	**6**
(United States) B Coupe (Germany) M Hilpert	2	4
WC	(Poland) **B Dąbrowski** (Poland) **Ł Kubot**	3	**7**	**6**
(Australia) B Ellwood (Australia) T Perry	**6**	5	3
WC	(Poland) K Kwinta (Poland) M Matkowski	4	3
4	(Australia) **P Hanley** (Australia) **N Healey**	**6**	**6**
(Slovakia) **D Hrbatý** (United States) **M Russell**	**7**	**6**
WC	(Poland) M Diłaj (Poland) M Fyrstenberg	5	4
WC	(Poland) M Gawłowski (Poland) R Nijaki	2	**6**	3
2	(South Africa) **R Koenig** (The Bahamas) **M Merklein**	**6**	4	**6**

Quarterfinals
1	(Czech Republic) F Čermák (Netherlands) S Groen	**6**	3	4
(Spain) **A Portas** (Spain) **T Robredo**	3	**6**	**6**
(Kazakhstan) Y Schukin (Czech Republic) D Škoch	1	4
(Georgia (country)) **I Labadze** (Hungary) **A Sávolt**	**6**	**6**
WC	(Poland) B Dąbrowski (Poland) Ł Kubot	5	**6**	5
4	(Australia) **P Hanley** (Australia) **N Healey**	**7**	4	**7**
(Slovakia) D Hrbatý (United States) M Russell
2	(South Africa) **R Koenig** (The Bahamas) **M Merklein**	**w/o**

Semifinals
(Spain) A Portas (Spain) T Robredo	**6**	6^{6}	4
(Georgia (country)) **I Labadze** (Hungary) **A Sávolt**	4	**7^{8}**	**6**
4	(Australia) **P Hanley** (Australia) **N Healey**	**7**	**7^{7}**
2	(South Africa) R Koenig (The Bahamas) M Merklein	5	6^{2}

Final
(Georgia (country)) Irakli Labadze (Hungary) Attila Sávolt	6^{10}	2
4	(Australia) **Paul Hanley** (Australia) **Nathan Healey**	**7^{12}**	**6**
