= 2001 Idea Prokom Open – Men's singles =

Men's singles
- 2001 Idea Prokom Open

Final
- Champion: (Spain) Tommy Robredo
- Runner-up: (Spain) Albert Portas
- Score: 1–6, 7–5, 7–6^{(7–2)}

Details
- Draw: 32
- Seeds: 8

Events
Singles	men	women
Doubles	men	women
- Idea Prokom Open

Tommy Robredo won in the final 1–6, 7–5, 7–6^{(7–2)} against Albert Portas.

== Seeds ==
A champion seed is indicated in bold text while text in italics indicates the round in which that seed was eliminated.

1. (Slovakia) Dominik Hrbatý (first round)
2. (Spain) Albert Portas (final)
3. (Spain) **Tommy Robredo (champion)**
4. (France) Cédric Pioline (first round)
5. (Russia) Mikhail Youzhny (second round)
6. (Belgium) Christophe Rochus (first round)
7. (Russia) Andrei Stoliarov (first round)
8. (Belgium) Olivier Rochus (first round)

== Draw ==
Key

- Q = Qualifier
- WC = Wild card
- LL = Lucky loser
- Alt = Alternate
- ITF = ITF entry
- PR = Protected ranking
- SR = Special ranking
- SE = Special exempt
- JE = Junior exempt
- JR = Junior Accelerator Programme entrant
- CO = College Accelerator Programme entrant
- NG = Next Gen Accelerator Program entrant
- w/o = Walkover
- r = Retired
- d = Defaulted

First round
1	(Slovakia) D Hrbatý	6^{3}	4
(Italy) **F Luzzi**	**7^{7}**	**6**
Q	(Spain) **Ó Serrano**	**6**	**6**
(Russia) N Davydenko	4	2
Q	(Kazakhstan) Y Schukin	4	6^{6}
SE	(Hungary) **A Sávolt**	**6**	**7^{8}**
SE	(Argentina) **D Nalbandian**	**6**	**6**
8	(Belgium) O Rochus	1	0
3	(Spain) **T Robredo**	**6**	3	**6**
WC	(Poland) K Pfeiffer	2	**6**	2
WC	(Spain) **C Cuadrado**	**6**	**7**
(Czech Republic) J Vaněk	4	5
Q	(Georgia (country)) **I Labadze**	**6**	**6**
(Spain) E Benfele Álvarez	2	2
(Germany) A Popp	2	4
5	(Russia) **M Youzhny**	**6**	**6**
6	(Belgium) C Rochus	4	4
(Argentina) **M Zabaleta**	**6**	**6**
(Spain) **D Sánchez**	**6**	**6**
(Switzerland) G Bastl	1	2
(Denmark) **K Pless**	**7^{7}**	**6**
(United States) M Russell	6^{1}	1
(Armenia) **S Sargsian**	**7^{7}**	**6**
4	(France) C Pioline	6^{5}	1
7	(Russia) A Stoliarov	4	2
Q	(Costa Rica) **J A Marín**	**6**	**6**
(Spain) **A Montañés**	**6**	**6**
(Romania) A Voinea	4	2
WC	(Switzerland) **M Rosset**	**6**	**2**
(Ukraine) A Medvedev	3	3	r
(Argentina) M Puerta	4	2
2	(Spain) **A Portas**	**6**	**6**

Second round
(Italy) F Luzzi	6^{3}	4
Q	(Spain) **Ó Serrano**	**7^{7}**	**6**
SE	(Hungary) A Sávolt	2	1
SE	(Argentina) **D Nalbandian**	**6**	**6**
3	(Spain) **T Robredo**	**6**	**6**
WC	(Spain) C Cuadrado	0	1
Q	(Georgia (country)) **I Labadze**	5	**6**	**6**
5	(Russia) M Youzhny	**7**	1	2
(Argentina) M Zabaleta	4	**7^{7}**	5
(Spain) **D Sánchez**	**6**	6^{4}	**7**
(Denmark) K Pless	4	5
(Armenia) **S Sargsian**	**6**	**7**
(Costa Rica) **J A Marín**	3	**6**	**6**
(Spain) A Montañés	**6**	3	4
WC	(Switzerland) M Rosset	1	3
2	(Spain) **A Portas**	**6**	**6**

Quarterfinals
Q	(Spain) Ó Serrano	2	3
SE	(Argentina) **D Nalbandian**	**6**	**6**
3	(Spain) **T Robredo**	1	**6**	**6**
Q	(Georgia (country)) I Labadze	**6**	3	2
(Spain) D Sánchez	4	**6**	4
(Armenia) **S Sargsian**	**6**	3	**6**
(Costa Rica) J A Marín	3	1
2	(Spain) **A Portas**	**6**	**6**

Semifinals
SE	(Argentina) D Nalbandian	3	2
3	(Spain) **T Robredo**	**6**	**6**
(Armenia) S Sargsian	3	6^{3}
2	(Spain) **A Portas**	**6**	**7^{7}**

Final
3	(Spain) **Tommy Robredo**	1	**7**	**7^{7}**
2	(Spain) Albert Portas	**6**	5	6^{2}
