= 2004 Idea Prokom Open – Men's doubles =

Men's doubles
- 2004 Idea Prokom Open

Final
- Champions: (Czech Republic) František Čermák (Czech Republic) Leoš Friedl
- Runners-up: (Argentina) Martín García (Argentina) Sebastián Prieto
- Score: 2–6, 6–2, 6–3

Events
| Singles | men | women |
| Doubles | men | women |
| ← 2003 · | Idea Prokom Open | · 2005 → |

Mariusz Fyrstenberg and Marcin Matkowski were the defending champions, but declined to participate to focus for the 2004 Summer Olympics.

František Čermák and Leoš Friedl won the title by defeating Martín García and Sebastián Prieto 2–6, 6–2, 6–3 in the final.

== Seeds ==
1. (Czech Republic) František Čermák / (Czech Republic) Leoš Friedl (champions)
2. (Argentina) Lucas Arnold Ker / (Argentina) Mariano Hood (quarterfinals)
3. (Czech Republic) Petr Pála / (Australia) Todd Perry (quarterfinals)
4. (Argentina) Martín García / (Argentina) Sebastián Prieto (final)

== Draw ==
=== Key ===
- Q = Qualifier
- WC = Wild card
- LL = Lucky loser
- Alt = Alternate
- SE = Special exempt
- PR = Protected ranking
- ITF = ITF entry
- JE = Junior exempt
- w/o = Walkover
- r = Retired
- d = Defaulted
- SR = Special ranking

=== Draw ===
First round
1 | (Czech Republic) F Čermák (Czech Republic) L Friedl | 7^{7} | 6
(Chile) A García (Spain) Á López Morón | 6^{5} | 3
WC | (Poland) K Kwinta (Poland) M Przysiężny | 3 | 3
(Czech Republic) T Cibulec (Czech Republic) D Škoch | 6 | 6
3 | (Czech Republic) P Pála (Australia) T Perry | 6 | 4 | 7^{7}
(Italy) M Bertolini (Belgium) T Vanhoudt | 4 | 6 | 6^{4}
(Germany) M Kohlmann (Sweden) J Landsberg | 6 | 6
WC | (Poland) B Dąbrowski (Poland) Ł Kubot | 1 | 4
(Italy) E Artoni (Argentina) J Mónaco | 6 | 3 | 6
(Spain) D Ferrer (Spain) Ó Hernández | 3 | 6 | 4
(Australia) A Fisher (Netherlands) R Wassen | 3 | 1
4 | (Argentina) M García (Argentina) S Prieto | 6 | 6
(Spain) G García-López (Spain) A Portas | 2 | 4
(Spain) A Martín (Spain) R Nadal | 6 | 6
(Spain) G Blanco (Australia) S Huss | 2 | 1
2 | (Argentina) L Arnold Ker (Argentina) M Hood | 6 | 6

Quarterfinals
1 | (Czech Republic) F Čermák (Czech Republic) L Friedl | 6 | 6
(Czech Republic) T Cibulec (Czech Republic) D Škoch | 1 | 2
3 | (Czech Republic) P Pála (Australia) T Perry | 0 | 1
(Germany) M Kohlmann (Sweden) J Landsberg | 6 | 6
(Italy) E Artoni (Argentina) J Mónaco | 3 | 3
4 | (Argentina) M García (Argentina) S Prieto | 6 | 6
(Spain) A Martín (Spain) R Nadal | 6 | 4 | 6
2 | (Argentina) L Arnold Ker (Argentina) M Hood | 1 | 6 | 1

Semifinals
1 | (Czech Republic) F Čermák (Czech Republic) L Friedl | 6 | 3 | 6
(Germany) M Kohlmann (Sweden) J Landsberg | 4 | 6 | 3
4 | (Argentina) M García (Argentina) S Prieto | 7 | 7^{7}
(Spain) A Martín (Spain) R Nadal | 5 | 6^{5}

Final
1 | (Czech Republic) F Čermák (Czech Republic) L Friedl | 2 | 6 | 6
4 | (Argentina) M García (Argentina) S Prieto | 6 | 2 | 3
