= 2003 Idea Prokom Open – Women's singles =

Women's singles
- 2003 Idea Prokom Open

Final
- Champion: (Israel) Anna Pistolesi
- Runner-up: (Czech Republic) Klára Koukalová
- Score: 6–2, 6–0

Details
- Draw: 30 (2WC/4Q/1LL)
- Seeds: 8

Events
Singles	men	women
Doubles	men	women
← 2002 ·	Orange Warsaw Open	· 2004 →

Dinara Safina was the defending champion in the Women's Singles event in the 2003 Idea Prokom Open, a Polish tennis competition. She retired in her quarter-final match against Anna Pistolesi.

Pistolesi won the title by defeating Klára Koukalová 6–2, 6–0 in the final.

== Seeds ==
The first two seeds received a bye into the second round.

1. (Russia) Anastasia Myskina (quarterfinals)
2. (Switzerland) Patty Schnyder (semifinals)
3. (Israel) Anna Pistolesi (champion)
4. (Czech Republic) Denisa Chládková (first round)
5. (Uzbekistan) Iroda Tulyaganova (first round)
6. (Slovenia) Maja Matevžič (quarterfinals, withdrew)
7. (Russia) Dinara Safina (quarterfinals, retired)
8. (Hungary) Petra Mandula (semifinals)

== Draw ==
=== Key ===
- Q = Qualifier
- WC = Wild card
- LL = Lucky loser
- Alt = Alternate
- SE = Special exempt
- PR = Protected ranking
- ITF = ITF entry
- JE = Junior exempt
- w/o = Walkover
- r = Retired
- d = Defaulted
- SR = Special ranking

=== Finals ===
Semifinals
8	(Hungary) Petra Mandula	6	3	0
(Czech Republic) Klára Koukalová	4	6	6
3	(Israel) Anna Pistolesi	5	6	6
2	(Switzerland) Patty Schnyder	7	4	2

Final
(Czech Republic) Klára Koukalová	2	0
3	(Israel) Anna Pistolesi	6	6

=== Top half ===
First round
(Czech Republic) E Birnerová	2	4
Q	(Germany) S Gehrlein	6	6
(Slovakia) Ľ Kurhajcová	5	3
(Spain) A Medina Garrigues	7	6
Q	(Ukraine) Y Beygelzimer	4	4
8	(Hungary) P Mandula	6	6
4	(Czech Republic) D Chládková	6	2	3
(France) S Cohen-Aloro	1	6	6
LL	(Czech Republic) L Průšová	7^{7}	1	3
(Czech Republic) K Koukalová	6^{2}	6	6
Q	(Austria) E Fauth	6	3	4
(Switzerland) M Casanova	2	6	6
Q	(Croatia) J Kostanić	6	6
5	(Uzbekistan) I Tulyaganova	2	2

Second round
1	(Russia) A Myskina	6	6
Q	(Germany) S Gehrlein	3	4
(Spain) A Medina Garrigues	4	0
8	(Hungary) P Mandula	6	6
(France) S Cohen-Aloro	6	4	1
(Czech Republic) K Koukalová	0	6	6
(Switzerland) M Casanova	3	6	6^{1}
Q	(Croatia) J Kostanić	6	2	7^{7}

Quarterfinals
1	(Russia) A Myskina	4	0^{r}
8	(Hungary) P Mandula	6	3
(Czech Republic) K Koukalová	6	6
Q	(Croatia) J Kostanić	1	0

Semifinals
8	(Hungary) P Mandula	6	3	0
(Czech Republic) K Koukalová	4	6	6

=== Bottom half ===
First round
7	(Russia) D Safina	6	4	6
(Poland) J Sakowicz	4	6	2
(Italy) F Pennetta	7	6
(Argentina) C Fernández	5	3
(Czech Republic) I Benešová	6	6
(Croatia) K Šprem	0	4
(Slovakia) H Nagyová	3	7	2
3	(Israel) A Pistolesi	6	5	6
6	(Slovenia) M Matevžič	6	2	6
(Austria) P Wartusch	2	6	3
(Italy) An Serra Zanetti	2	3
(Germany) A Barna	6	6
(Croatia) S Talaja	7	6
WC	(Poland) M Domachowska	5	3

Second round
7	(Russia) D Safina	6	7^{7}
(Italy) F Pennetta	1	6^{3}
(Czech Republic) I Benešová	1	2
3	(Israel) A Pistolesi	6	6
6	(Slovenia) M Matevžič	6	7^{7}
(Germany) A Barna	3	6^{2}
(Croatia) S Talaja	6	3	6^{5}
2	(Switzerland) P Schnyder	2	6	7^{7}

Quarterfinals
7	(Russia) D Safina	7^{9}	1	1^{r}
3	(Israel) A Pistolesi	6^{7}	6	4
6	(Slovenia) M Matevžič
2	(Switzerland) P Schnyder	w/o

Semifinals
3	(Israel) A Pistolesi	5	6	6
2	(Switzerland) P Schnyder	7	4	2
