= 2002 Idea Prokom Open =

- Date: 21–28 July
- Edition: 2nd (men) / 5th (women)
- Category: International Series (men); Tier III (women)
- Surface: Clay / outdoors
- Location: Sopot, Poland

Champions

Men's singles
- (Argentina) José Acasuso

Women's singles
- (Russia) Dinara Safina

Men's doubles
- (Czech Republic) František Čermák / (Czech Republic) Leoš Friedl

Women's doubles
- (Russia) Svetlana Kuznetsova / (Spain) Arantxa Sánchez-Vicario
← 2001 ·	Idea Prokom Open	· 2003 →

The 2002 Idea Prokom Open was a combined men's and women's tennis tournament played on outdoor clay courts in Sopot in Poland that was part of the International Series of the 2002 ATP Tour and of Tier III of the 2002 WTA Tour. The tournament ran from 21 July through 28 July 2002. José Acasuso and Dinara Safina won the singles titles.

== Finals ==
=== Men's singles ===
(Argentina) José Acasuso defeated (Argentina) Franco Squillari 2–6, 6–1, 6–3

- It was Acasuso's only title of the year and the 1st of his career.

=== Women's singles ===
(Russia) Dinara Safina defeated (Slovakia) Henrieta Nagyová 6–3, 4–0 (Nagyová retired)

- It was Safina's only title of the year and the 1st of her career.

=== Men's doubles ===
(Czech Republic) František Čermák / (Czech Republic) Leoš Friedl defeated (South Africa) Jeff Coetzee / (Australia) Nathan Healey 7–5, 7–5

- It was Čermák's 2nd title of the year and the 2nd of his career. It was Friedl's only title of the year and the 2nd of his career.

=== Women's doubles ===
(Russia) Svetlana Kuznetsova / (Spain) Arantxa Sánchez-Vicario defeated (Russia) Evgenia Kulikovskaya / (Russia) Ekaterina Sysoeva 6–2, 6–2

- It was Kuznetsova's 1st title of the year and the 1st of her career. It was Sánchez-Vicario's 3rd title of the year and the 98th of her career.
