= 2002 Idea Prokom Open – Men's singles =

Men's singles
- 2002 Idea Prokom Open
- 2001 Champion: (Spain) Tommy Robredo

Final
- Champion: (Argentina) José Acasuso
- Runner-up: (Argentina) Franco Squillari
- Score: 2–6, 6–1, 6–3

Events
Singles	men	women
Doubles	men	women
- Idea Prokom Open

Tommy Robredo was the defending champion but did not compete that year.

José Acasuso won in the final 2–6, 6–1, 6–3 against Franco Squillari.

== Seeds ==
A champion seed is indicated in bold text while text in italics indicates the round in which that seed was eliminated.

1. (Czech Republic) Jiří Novák (second round)
2. (Spain) Carlos Moyá (semifinals)
3. (France) Fabrice Santoro (second round)
4. (Slovakia) Dominik Hrbatý (second round)
5. (Spain) David Sánchez (first round)
6. (Belgium) Olivier Rochus (first round)
7. (Russia) Mikhail Youzhny (quarterfinals)
8. (Czech Republic) Jan Vacek (quarterfinals)

== Draw ==
Key

- Q = Qualifier
- WC = Wild card
- LL = Lucky loser
- Alt = Alternate
- ITF = ITF entry
- PR = Protected ranking
- SR = Special ranking
- SE = Special exempt
- JE = Junior exempt
- JR = Junior Accelerator Programme entrant
- CO = College Accelerator Programme entrant
- NG = Next Gen Accelerator Program entrant
- w/o = Walkover
- r = Retired
- d = Defaulted

First round
1	(Czech Republic) **J Novák**	6^{3}	**6**	**6**
Q	(France) S de Chaunac	**7^{7}**	3	2
(Spain) F López	4	3
(Hungary) **A Sávolt**	**6**	**6**
WC	(Poland) R Nijaki	2	r
(France) **P-H Mathieu**	**5**
WC	(Poland) B Dąbrowski	6^{2}	0
7	(Russia) **M Youzhny**	**7^{7}**	**6**
3	(France) **F Santoro**	**6**	**6**
Q	(Finland) K Tiilikainen	4	1
(Belgium) **C Rochus**	**6**	**6**
SE	(Spain) D Ferrer	4	3
Q	(Spain) **F Verdasco**	1	**6**	**6**
Q	(Argentina) M Puerta	**6**	2	4
(Argentina) **F Squillari**	0	**6**	**6**
5	(Spain) D Sánchez	**6**	4	4
8	(Czech Republic) **J Vacek**	**6**	**6**
(United States) A Kim	0	4
WC	(Belarus) V Voltchkov	2	**6**	1
SE	(Croatia) **Ž Krajan**	**6**	3	**6**
(Peru) L Horna	5	5
(Argentina) **J Acasuso**	**7**	**7**
(Spain) A Portas	2	3
4	(Slovakia) **D Hrbatý**	**6**	**6**
6	(Belgium) O Rochus	5	2
(Italy) **S Galvani**	**7**	**6**
(Argentina) E Massa	**6**	6^{3}	6^{2}
(Switzerland) **M Rosset**	1	**7^{7}**	**7^{7}**
(Germany) A Popp	**6**	6^{4}	2
(Russia) **A Stoliarov**	3	**7^{7}**	**6**
(Sweden) A Vinciguerra	2	1
2	(Spain) **C Moyá**	**6**	**6**

Second round
1	(Czech Republic) J Novák	6^{7}	4
(Hungary) **A Sávolt**	**7^{9}**	**6**
(France) P-H Mathieu	**6**	0	4
7	(Russia) **M Youzhny**	2	**6**	**6**
3	(France) F Santoro	**6**	3	5
(Belgium) **C Rochus**	4	**6**	**7**
Q	(Spain) F Verdasco	4	5
(Argentina) **F Squillari**	**6**	**7**
8	(Czech Republic) **J Vacek**	1	**6**	**6**
SE	(Croatia) Ž Krajan	**6**	0	3
(Argentina) **J Acasuso**	**6**	**6**
4	(Slovakia) D Hrbatý	2	4
(Italy) **S Galvani**	**6**	**6**
(Switzerland) M Rosset	4	1
(Russia) A Stoliarov	4	1
2	(Spain) **C Moyá**	**6**	**6**

Quarterfinals
(Hungary) **A Sávolt**	**7^{7}**	6^{3}	**6**
7	(Russia) M Youzhny	6^{5}	**7^{7}**	4
(Belgium) C Rochus	3	4
(Argentina) **F Squillari**	**6**	**6**
8	(Czech Republic) J Vacek	4	2
(Argentina) **J Acasuso**	**6**	**6**
(Italy) S Galvani	**6**	3	1
2	(Spain) **C Moyá**	2	**6**	**6**

Semifinals
(Hungary) A Sávolt	4	3
(Argentina) **F Squillari**	**6**	**6**
(Argentina) **J Acasuso**	**7^{7}**	**7^{7}**
2	(Spain) C Moyá	6^{5}	6^{4}

Final
(Argentina) Franco Squillari	**6**	1	3
(Argentina) **José Acasuso**	2	**6**	**6**
