= 2004 Idea Prokom Open – Women's singles =

Women's singles
- 2004 Idea Prokom Open

Final
- Champion: (Italy) Flavia Pennetta
- Runner-up: (Czech Republic) Klára Koukalová
- Score: 7–5, 3–6, 6–3

Details
- Draw: 30
- Seeds: 8

Events
Singles	men	women
Doubles	men	women
← 2003 ·	Idea Prokom Open

Anna Smashnova-Pistolesi was the defending champion, but lost in second round to Marta Domachowska.

Flavia Pennetta won the title by defeating Klára Koukalová 7–5, 3–6, 6–3 in the final.

== Seeds ==
The first two seeds received a bye into the second round.

1. (Russia) Anastasia Myskina (semifinals, withdrew)
2. (Israel) Anna Smashnova-Pistolesi (second round)
3. (Russia) Dinara Safina (second round)
4. (Spain) Anabel Medina Garrigues (first round)
5. (Czech Republic) Iveta Benešová (quarterfinals)
6. (Spain) ~~Magüi Serna~~ (withdrew due to an injury)
7. (Germany) ~~Anca Barna~~ (withdrew to focus on the Olympics)
8. (Spain) ~~Arantxa Parra Santonja~~ (withdrew due to an illness)
9. (Italy) Flavia Pennetta (champion)
10. (Spain) Marta Marrero (quarterfinals)
11. (Czech Republic) Klára Koukalová (final)

== Draw ==
=== Key ===
- Q = Qualifier
- WC = Wild card
- LL = Lucky loser
- Alt = Alternate
- ITF = ITF entry
- PR = Protected ranking
- SR = Special ranking
- SE = Special exempt
- JE = Junior exempt
- JR = Junior Accelerator Programme entrant
- CO = College Accelerator Programme entrant
- NG = Next Gen Accelerator Program entrant
- w/o = Walkover
- r = Retired
- d = Defaulted

=== Finals ===
Semifinals
1	(Russia) Anastasia Myskina
11	(Czech Republic) Klára Koukalová	w/o
9	(Italy) Flavia Pennetta	6	6
WC	(Poland) Marta Domachowska	2	2

Final
11	(Czech Republic) Klára Koukalová	5	6	3
9	(Italy) Flavia Pennetta	7	3	6

=== Top half ===
First round
(Czech Republic) Z Ondrášková	3	6	7
(France) S Cohen-Aloro	6	1	5
(Croatia) S Talaja	6	6
Q	(Tunisia) S Sfar	4	2
WC	(Poland) M Kiszczyńska	2	3
5	(Czech Republic) I Benešová	6	6
3	(Russia) D Safina	6	6
LL	(Czech Republic) M Paštiková	4	4
(Slovakia) Ľ Kurhajcová	2	6	6
(Italy) A Canepa	6	4	1
(Russia) V Dushevina	6	6
LL	(Ukraine) K Bondarenko	0	2
LL	(Germany) M Müller	5	3
11	(Czech Republic) K Koukalová	7	6

Second round
1	(Russia) A Myskina	6	6
(Czech Republic) Z Ondrášková	2	2
(Croatia) S Talaja	6	4	2
5	(Czech Republic) I Benešová	1	6	6
3	(Russia) D Safina	2	4
(Slovakia) Ľ Kurhajcová	6	6
(Russia) V Dushevina	6^{1}	6	4
11	(Czech Republic) K Koukalová	7^{7}	3	6

Quarterfinals
1	(Russia) A Myskina	6	6
5	(Czech Republic) I Benešová	3	4
(Slovakia) Ľ Kurhajcová	2	1
11	(Czech Republic) K Koukalová	6	6

Semifinals
1	(Russia) A Myskina
11	(Czech Republic) K Koukalová	w/o

=== Bottom half ===
First round
9	(Italy) F Pennetta	6	6
Q	(Croatia) S Mamić	1	2
(Austria) B Schwartz	1	2
LL	(Czech Republic) L Průšová	6	6
(Spain) N Llagostera Vives	6	6
Q	(Hungary) Z Gubacsi	2	0
(Slovakia) Ľ Cervanová	6	6
4	(Spain) A Medina Garrigues	3	1
10	(Spain) M Marrero	6	4	6
(Colombia) C Castaño	2	6	4
Q	(Czech Republic) E Birnerová	6	6
LL	(Poland) K Jans	2	2
WC	(Poland) M Domachowska	6	6
(Slovakia) M Suchá	0	2

Second round
9	(Italy) F Pennetta	6	6
LL	(Czech Republic) L Průšová	4	2
(Spain) N Llagostera Vives	6^{4}	6	7
(Slovakia) Ľ Cervanová	7^{7}	1	5
10	(Spain) M Marrero	6	7^{7}
Q	(Czech Republic) E Birnerová	2	6^{4}
WC	(Poland) M Domachowska	7^{7}	6
2	(Israel) A Smashnova-Pistolesi	6^{4}	1

Quarterfinals
9	(Italy) F Pennetta	6	7^{7}
(Spain) N Llagostera Vives	2	6^{4}
10	(Spain) M Marrero	1	4
WC	(Poland) M Domachowska	6	6

Semifinals
9	(Italy) F Pennetta	6	6
WC	(Poland) M Domachowska	2	2
