= 2002 Idea Prokom Open – Men's doubles =

Men's doubles
- 2002 Idea Prokom Open
- 2001 Champions: (Australia) Paul Hanley (Australia) Nathan Healey

Final
- Champions: (Czech Republic) František Čermák (Czech Republic) Leoš Friedl
- Runners-up: (South Africa) Jeff Coetzee (Australia) Nathan Healey
- Score: 7–5, 7–5

Events
Singles	men	women
Doubles	men	women
← 2001 ·	Idea Prokom Open	· 2003 →

Paul Hanley and Nathan Healey were the defending champions but only Healey competed that year with Jeff Coetzee.

Coetzee and Healey lost in the final 7–5, 7–5 against František Čermák and Leoš Friedl.

== Seeds ==
Champion seeds are indicated in bold text while text in italics indicates the round in which those seeds were eliminated.

1. (Czech Republic) **František Čermák** / (Czech Republic) **Leoš Friedl (champions)**
2. (North Macedonia) Aleksandar Kitinov / (Czech Republic) Petr Luxa (first round)
3. (South Africa) Jeff Coetzee / (Australia) Nathan Healey (final)
4. (Australia) Jordan Kerr / (Sweden) Johan Landsberg (semifinals)

== Draw ==
=== Key ===
- Q = Qualifier
- WC = Wild card
- LL = Lucky loser
- Alt = Alternate
- SE = Special exempt
- PR = Protected ranking
- ITF = ITF entry
- JE = Junior exempt
- w/o = Walkover
- r = Retired
- d = Defaulted
- SR = Special ranking

First round
1	(Czech Republic) **F Čermák** (Czech Republic) **L Friedl**	4	**6**	**6**
(Spain) J I Carrasco (Spain) Á López Morón	**6**	3	3
(Australia) T Crichton (Australia) T Perry	3	**6**	6^{2}
(Argentina) **E Massa** (Czech Republic) **J Vacek**	**6**	1	**7^{7}**
4	(Australia) **J Kerr** (Sweden) **J Landsberg**	**6**	**6**
(Italy) L Azzaro (Chile) J Fillol Jr.	3	1
WC	(Poland) **M Fyrstenberg** (Poland) **M Matkowski**	**6**	**6**
WC	(Poland) M Gawłowski (Poland) Ł Kubot	4	4
(Netherlands) S Groen (South Africa) P Rosner	1	3
(Kazakhstan) **Y Schukin** (Belarus) **V Voltchkov**	**6**	**6**
(Czech Republic) J Levinský (Czech Republic) D Škoch	4	1
3	(South Africa) **J Coetzee** (Australia) **N Healey**	**6**	**6**
(South Africa) W Moodie (South Africa) S Rudman	4	5
(Belgium) **C Rochus** (Belgium) **O Rochus**	**6**	**7**
WC	(Poland) **B Dąbrowski** (Poland) **M Przysiężny**	**6**	3	**7^{8}**
2	(North Macedonia) A Kitinov (Czech Republic) P Luxa	3	**6**	6^{6}

Quarterfinals
1	(Czech Republic) **F Čermák** (Czech Republic) **L Friedl**	**6**	**6**
(Argentina) E Massa (Czech Republic) J Vacek	3	4
4	(Australia) **J Kerr** (Sweden) **J Landsberg**	**6**	**6**
WC	(Poland) M Fyrstenberg (Poland) M Matkowski	3	4
(Kazakhstan) Y Schukin (Belarus) V Voltchkov	4	1
3	(South Africa) **J Coetzee** (Australia) **N Healey**	**6**	**6**
(Belgium) **C Rochus** (Belgium) **O Rochus**	**7**	**6**
WC	(Poland) B Dąbrowski (Poland) M Przysiężny	5	2

Semifinals
1	(Czech Republic) **F Čermák** (Czech Republic) **L Friedl**	**6**	**6**
4	(Australia) J Kerr (Sweden) J Landsberg	3	2
3	(South Africa) **J Coetzee** (Australia) **N Healey**	5	**6**	**6**
(Belgium) C Rochus (Belgium) O Rochus	**7**	4	2

Final
1	(Czech Republic) **František Čermák** (Czech Republic) **Leoš Friedl**	**7**	**7**
3	(South Africa) Jeff Coetzee (Australia) Nathan Healey	5	5
