= 2002 Idea Prokom Open – Women's doubles =

Women's doubles
- 2002 Idea Prokom Open

Final
- Champions: (Russia) Svetlana Kuznetsova (Spain) Arantxa Sánchez Vicario
- Runners-up: (Russia) Evgenia Kulikovskaya (Russia) Ekaterina Sysoeva
- Score: 6–2, 6–2

Events
Singles	men	women
Doubles	men	women
← 2001 ·	Idea Prokom Open	· 2003 →

Joannette Kruger and Francesca Schiavone were the defending champions, but did not compete this year.

Svetlana Kuznetsova and Arantxa Sánchez Vicario won the title by defeating Evgenia Kulikovskaya and Ekaterina Sysoeva 6–2, 6–2 in the final.

== Seeds ==
Champion seeds are indicated in bold text while text in italics indicates the round in which those seeds were eliminated.

1. (Italy) Silvia Farina Elia / (Sweden) Åsa Svensson (semifinals)
2. (Spain) Marta Marrero / (Spain) María José Martínez Sánchez (first round)
3. (Belarus) Tatiana Poutchek / (Russia) Anastasia Rodionova (quarterfinals)
4. **(Russia) Svetlana Kuznetsova / (Spain) Arantxa Sánchez Vicario (champions)**

== Draw ==
=== Key ===
- Q = Qualifier
- WC = Wild card
- LL = Lucky loser
- Alt = Alternate
- ITF = ITF entry
- PR = Protected ranking
- SR = Special ranking
- SE = Special exempt
- JE = Junior exempt
- JR = Junior Accelerator Programme entrant
- CO = College Accelerator Programme entrant
- NG = Next Gen Accelerator Program entrant
- w/o = Walkover
- r = Retired
- d = Defaulted

=== Draw ===
First round
1	**(Italy) S Farina Elia** **(Sweden) Å Svensson**	**6**	**6**
(Germany) A Glass (Romania) A Vanc	3	3
**(Ukraine) Y Beygelzimer** **(Ukraine) A Zaporozhanova**	1	**6**	**7^{7}**
(Latvia) L Dekmeijere (Italy) T Garbin	**6**	4	6^{2}
4	**(Russia) S Kuznetsova** **(Spain) A Sánchez Vicario**	**7^{7}**	**6**
(Argentina) M Díaz Oliva (Croatia) M Palaveršić	6^{4}	2
**(Croatia) J Kostanić** **(Slovakia) H Nagyová**	**7^{7}**	3	**6**
(Russia) M Goloviznina (Russia) V Zvonareva	6^{4}	**6**	4
(Germany) A Barna (Germany) A Roesch	2	1
**(Russia) E Kulikovskaya** **(Russia) E Sysoeva**	**6**	**6**
Q	(Poland) O Brózda (Poland) M Tokarska	6^{0}	1
3	**(Belarus) T Poutchek** **(Russia) A Rodionova**	**7^{7}**	**6**
WC	**(Poland) M Domachowska** **(Poland) K Jans**	4	**6**	**6**
(Czech Republic) E Martincová (Czech Republic) L Němečková	**6**	3	3
**(Australia) C Barclay** **(Germany) M Müller**	**6**	5	**6**
2	(Spain) M Marrero (Spain) MJ Martínez Sánchez	4	**7**	1

Quarterfinals
1	**(Italy) S Farina Elia** **(Sweden) Å Svensson**	**6**	**7^{8}**
(Ukraine) Y Beygelzimer (Ukraine) A Zaporozhanova	1	6^{6}
4	**(Russia) S Kuznetsova** **(Spain) A Sánchez Vicario**	**6**	**6**
(Croatia) J Kostanić (Slovakia) H Nagyová	2	0
**(Russia) E Kulikovskaya** **(Russia) E Sysoeva**	**7**	**6**
3	(Belarus) T Poutchek (Russia) A Rodionova	5	0
WC	**(Poland) M Domachowska** **(Poland) K Jans**	**7**	**6**
(Australia) C Barclay (Germany) M Müller	5	1

Semifinals
1	(Italy) S Farina Elia (Sweden) Å Svensson	**7^{7}**	2	2
4	**(Russia) S Kuznetsova** **(Spain) A Sánchez Vicario**	6^{2}	**6**	**6**
**(Russia) E Kulikovskaya** **(Russia) E Sysoeva**	3	**7**	**6**
WC	(Poland) M Domachowska (Poland) K Jans	**6**	5	1

Final
4	**(Russia) S Kuznetsova** **(Spain) A Sánchez Vicario**	**6**	**6**
(Russia) E Kulikovskaya (Russia) E Sysoeva	2	2
