= 2003 Idea Prokom Open – Men's singles =

Men's singles
- 2003 Idea Prokom Open

Final
- Champion: (Argentina) Guillermo Coria
- Runner-up: (Spain) David Ferrer
- Score: 7–5, 6–1

Events
Singles	men	women
Doubles	men	women
- Idea Prokom Open

José Acasuso was the defending champion but did not compete that year.

Guillermo Coria won in the final 7–5, 6–1 against David Ferrer.

== Seeds ==
A champion seed is indicated in bold text while text in italics indicates the round in which that seed was eliminated.

1. (Spain) Juan Carlos Ferrero (quarterfinals)
2. (Spain) Carlos Moyá (first round)
3. (Argentina) **Guillermo Coria (champion)**
4. (Argentina) David Nalbandian (second round)
5. (Italy) Filippo Volandri (first round)
6. (Spain) David Sánchez (second round)
7. (Slovakia) Dominik Hrbatý (second round)
8. (France) Olivier Mutis (quarterfinals)

== Draw ==
Key

- Q = Qualifier
- WC = Wild card
- LL = Lucky loser
- Alt = Alternate
- ITF = ITF entry
- PR = Protected ranking
- SR = Special ranking
- SE = Special exempt
- JE = Junior exempt
- JR = Junior Accelerator Programme entrant
- CO = College Accelerator Programme entrant
- NG = Next Gen Accelerator Program entrant
- w/o = Walkover
- r = Retired
- d = Defaulted

First round
1	(Spain) **J C Ferrero**	**6**	**6**
WC	(Poland) B Dąbrowski	3	1
Q	(Czech Republic) **F Čermák**	**6**	**6**
Q	(Poland) F Urban	4	2
(Hungary) A Sávolt	1	1
(Peru) **L Horna**	**6**	**6**
WC	(Poland) M Fyrstenberg	5	3
7	(Slovakia) **D Hrbatý**	**7**	**6**
3	(Argentina) **G Coria**	**6**	**6**
(Romania) V Hănescu	3	4
(Belgium) **C Rochus**	**6**	**6**
(Argentina) F Browne	3	3
Q	(Germany) **M-K Goellner**	**6**	4	**6**
(Switzerland) M Kratochvil	4	**6**	3
(Romania) A Voinea	2	4
8	(France) **O Mutis**	**6**	**6**
6	(Spain) **D Sánchez**	**6**	**6**
(Sweden) M Norman	4	2
(Italy) G Galimberti	3	2
(Sweden) **A Vinciguerra**	**6**	**6**
Q	(Czech Republic) B Ulihrach	6^{2}	2
(Spain) **D Ferrer**	**7^{7}**	**6**
(Switzerland) M Rosset	2	4
4	(Argentina) **D Nalbandian**	**6**	**6**
5	(Italy) F Volandri	4	0
(Argentina) **M Puerta**	**6**	**6**
(Spain) **R Ramírez Hidalgo**	**7**	3	**6**
(Austria) J Knowle	5	**6**	1
WC	(Poland) M Matkowski	0	1
(Spain) **G Blanco**	**6**	**6**
(Spain) **A Portas**	**7^{7}**	6^{6}	**7**
2	(Spain) C Moyá	6^{4}	**7^{8}**	5

Second round
1	(Spain) **J C Ferrero**	4	**7**	**6**
Q	(Czech Republic) F Čermák	**6**	5	2
(Peru) **L Horna**	**6**	**6**
7	(Slovakia) D Hrbatý	3	1
3	(Argentina) **G Coria**	**6**	**6**
(Belgium) C Rochus	1	0
Q	(Germany) M-K Goellner	4	2
8	(France) **O Mutis**	**6**	**6**
6	(Spain) D Sánchez	3	4
(Sweden) **A Vinciguerra**	**6**	**6**
(Spain) **D Ferrer**	**6**	4	**6**
4	(Argentina) D Nalbandian	4	**6**	3
(Argentina) M Puerta	3	3
(Spain) **R Ramírez Hidalgo**	**6**	**6**
(Spain) **G Blanco**	3	**6**	**6**
(Spain) A Portas	**6**	1	4

Quarterfinals
1	(Spain) J C Ferrero	1	6^{1}
(Peru) **L Horna**	**6**	**7^{7}**
3	(Argentina) **G Coria**	**6**	**6**
8	(France) O Mutis	3	4
(Sweden) A Vinciguerra	1	2
(Spain) **D Ferrer**	**6**	**6**
(Spain) **R Ramírez Hidalgo**	6^{7}	**6**	**6**
(Spain) G Blanco	**7^{9}**	4	0

Semifinals
(Peru) L Horna	2	2
3	(Argentina) **G Coria**	**6**	**6**
(Spain) **D Ferrer**	6^{2}	**6**	**6**
(Spain) R Ramírez Hidalgo	**7^{7}**	3	4

Final
3	(Argentina) **Guillermo Coria**	**7**	**6**
(Spain) David Ferrer	5	1
