= 2004 Idea Prokom Open – Women's doubles =

Women's doubles
- 2004 Idea Prokom Open

Final
- Champions: (Spain) Nuria Llagostera Vives (Spain) Marta Marrero
- Runners-up: (Poland) Klaudia Jans (Poland) Alicja Rosolska
- Score: 6–4, 6–3

Details
- Draw: 16
- Seeds: 4

Events
Singles	men	women
Doubles	men	women
- Idea Prokom Open

Tatiana Perebiynis and Silvija Talaja were the defending champions, but Perebiynis did not compete this year. Talaja teamed up with Stéphanie Cohen-Aloro and lost in semifinals to tournament winners Nuria Llagostera Vives and Marta Marrero.

Llagostera Vives and Marrero defeated Klaudia Jans and Alicja Rosolska 6–4, 6–3 in the final.

== Seeds ==
1. (Czech Republic) Iveta Benešová / (Slovakia) Ľubomíra Kurhajcová (semifinals)
2. (Czech Republic) Olga Blahotová / (Czech Republic) Gabriela Navrátilová (quarterfinals)
3. (Belarus) Tatiana Poutchek / (Russia) Anastasia Rodionova (quarterfinals)
4. (France) Stéphanie Cohen-Aloro / (Croatia) Silvija Talaja (semifinals)

== Draw ==
Key

- Q = Qualifier
- WC = Wild card
- LL = Lucky loser
- Alt = Alternate
- ITF = ITF entry
- PR = Protected ranking
- SR = Special ranking
- SE = Special exempt
- JE = Junior exempt
- JR = Junior Accelerator Programme entrant
- CO = College Accelerator Programme entrant
- NG = Next Gen Accelerator Program entrant
- w/o = Walkover
- r = Retired
- d = Defaulted

=== Draw ===
First round
1	(Czech Republic) I Benešová (Slovakia) Ľ Kurhajcová	5	6	7
(Austria) D Klemenschits (Austria) S Klemenschits	7	3	5
Q	(Colombia) C Castaño (Italy) V Sassi	3	6	6
(Spain) P García (Spain) A Medina Garrigues	6	3	4
3	(Belarus) T Poutchek (Russia) A Rodionova	6	6
(Netherlands) K Kilsdonk (Czech Republic) H Šromová	4	1
(Hungary) K Marosi (Brazil) M Tavares	6^{2}	3
WC	(Poland) K Jans (Poland) A Rosolska	7^{7}	6
(Ukraine) A Bondarenko (Ukraine) V Bondarenko	6	4	6
(Czech Republic) E Birnerová (Austria) B Schwartz	2	6	2
(Russia) G Fattakhetdinova (Belarus) D Kustova	2	5
4	(France) S Cohen-Aloro (Croatia) S Talaja	6	7
(Spain) N Llagostera Vives (Spain) M Marrero	6	6^{4}	6
(Germany) M Müller (Belarus) N Ostrovskaya	2	7^{7}	1
(Hungary) Z Gubacsi (Czech Republic) M Paštiková	7^{7}	3	2
2	(Czech Republic) O Blahotová (Czech Republic) G Navrátilová	6^{5}	6	6

Quarterfinals
1	(Czech Republic) I Benešová (Slovakia) Ľ Kurhajcová	6	6
Q	(Colombia) C Castaño (Italy) V Sassi	3	3
3	(Belarus) T Poutchek (Russia) A Rodionova	6	4	4
WC	(Poland) K Jans (Poland) A Rosolska	3	6	6
(Ukraine) A Bondarenko (Ukraine) V Bondarenko	2	4
4	(France) S Cohen-Aloro (Croatia) S Talaja	6	6
(Spain) N Llagostera Vives (Spain) M Marrero	1	6	6
2	(Czech Republic) O Blahotová (Czech Republic) G Navrátilová	6	4	3

Semifinals
1	(Czech Republic) I Benešová (Slovakia) Ľ Kurhajcová	4	4
WC	(Poland) K Jans (Poland) A Rosolska	6	6
4	(France) S Cohen-Aloro (Croatia) S Talaja	2	2
(Spain) N Llagostera Vives (Spain) M Marrero	6	6

Final
WC	(Poland) K Jans (Poland) A Rosolska	4	3
(Spain) N Llagostera Vives (Spain) M Marrero	6	6
