= Monika Krauze =

Polish tennis player

- Country (sports): Poland
- Born: 11 April 1984 (age 40)
- Turned pro: 2000
- Retired: 2008
- Plays: Right-handed

Monika Krauze (born 11 April 1984) is a former professional tennis player from Poland. On 16 July 2007, she reached her highest singles ranking of 716 by the WTA.

== Tennis career ==
In her career, she won two doubles titles on the ITF Women's Circuit. Her only WTA Tour main-draw appearance came at the 2003 Idea Prokom Open where she partnered with Marta Domachowska in the doubles event. They lost in the first round to French duo Stéphanie Cohen-Aloro and Caroline Dhenin.
