= 2000 Idea Prokom Open =

- Date: 17–23 July
- Edition: 3rd
- Category: Tier III
- Draw: 30S / 16D
- Prize money: $170,000
- Surface: Clay / outdoor
- Location: Sopot, Poland

Champions

Singles
- (Germany) Anke Huber

Doubles
- (Spain) Virginia Ruano Pascual (Argentina) Paola Suárez
- Idea Prokom Open

The 2000 Prokom Polish Open was a women's tennis tournament played on outdoor clay courts in Sopot, Poland that was part of the Tier III category of the 2000 WTA Tour. It was the third edition of the Polish Open and took place from 17 July until 23 July 2000. Second-seeded Anke Huber won the singles title and earned $27,000 first-prize money.

== Finals ==
=== Singles ===
(Germany) Anke Huber defeated (Spain) Gala León García, 7–6^{(7–4)}, 6–3

- It was Huber's 2nd singles title of the year and the 12th of her career.

=== Doubles ===
(Spain) Virginia Ruano Pascual / (Argentina) Paola Suárez defeated (Sweden) Åsa Carlsson / (Italy) Rita Grande, 7–5, 6–1
