= 2013 Valencia Open 500 =

- Date: 21–27 October
- Edition: 19th
- Category: ATP World Tour 500
- Draw: 32S / 16D
- Prize money: €1,496,095
- Surface: Hard / indoor
- Location: Valencia, Spain
- Venue: Ciutat de les Arts i les Ciències

Champions

Singles
- (Russia) Mikhail Youzhny

Doubles
- (Austria) Alexander Peya / (Brazil) Bruno Soares
← 2012 ·	Valencia Open	· 2014 →

The 2013 Valencia Open 500 was a men's tennis tournament played on indoor hard courts. It was the 19th edition of the Valencia Open, and part of the 500 Series of the 2013 ATP World Tour. It was held at the Ciutat de les Arts i les Ciències in Valencia, Spain, from 21 October through 27 October 2013. Unseeded Mikhail Youzhny won the singles title.

== Points and prize money ==
=== Point distribution ===
Event	W	F	SF	QF	Round of 16	Round of 32	Q	Q2	Q1
Singles	500	300	180	90	45	0	20	10	0
Doubles	500	300	180	90	0	—	—	—	—

=== Prize money ===
Event	W	F	SF	QF	Round of 16	Round of 32	Q2	Q1
Singles	€360,000	€162,300	€76,860	€37,100	€18,920	€10,400	€1,175	€650
Doubles	€106,350	€47,980	€22,620	€10,940	€5,610	—	—	—

== Singles main-draw entrants ==
=== Seeds ===
Country	Player	Rank^{1}	Seed
ESP	David Ferrer	3	1
GER	Tommy Haas	12	2
ESP	Nicolás Almagro	13	3
USA	John Isner	14	4
POL	Jerzy Janowicz	15	5
FRA	Gilles Simon	16	6
ITA	Fabio Fognini	17	7
RSA	Kevin Anderson	20	8

- Rankings are as of October 14, 2013

=== Other entrants ===
The following players received wildcards into the singles main draw:

- (Spain) Roberto Bautista Agut
- (Spain) Guillermo García López
- (Spain) Fernando Verdasco

The following players received entry from the qualifying draw:

- (Spain) Pablo Carreño Busta
- (Colombia) Alejandro Falla
- (Poland) Michał Przysiężny
- (Portugal) João Sousa

=== Withdrawals ===
Before the tournament

- (Croatia) Marin Čilić (suspension)
- (Austria) Jürgen Melzer
- (Argentina) Juan Mónaco
- (United States) Sam Querrey
- (Spain) Tommy Robredo

=== Retirements ===
- (Serbia) Janko Tipsarević (heel injury)
- (Australia) Bernard Tomic

== Doubles main-draw entrants ==
=== Seeds ===
Country	Player	Country	Player	Rank^{1}	Seed
USA	Bob Bryan	USA	Mike Bryan	2	1
AUT	Alexander Peya	BRA	Bruno Soares	7	2
ESP	Marcel Granollers	ESP	Marc López	13	3
ESP	David Marrero	ESP	Fernando Verdasco	28	4

- Rankings are as of October 14, 2013

=== Other entrants ===
The following pairs received wildcards into the doubles main draw:

- (Spain) Pablo Andújar / (Spain) Guillermo García López
- (Spain) Roberto Bautista Agut / (Spain) Pablo Carreño Busta

== Finals ==
=== Singles ===
- (Russia) Mikhail Youzhny defeated (Spain) David Ferrer, 6–3, 7–5

=== Doubles ===
- (Austria) Alexander Peya / (Brazil) Bruno Soares defeated (United States) Bob Bryan / (United States) Mike Bryan, 7–6^{(7–3)}, 6–7^{(1–7)}, [13–11]
