= 2011 Valencia Open 500 – Singles =

Singles
- 2011 Valencia Open 500

Final
- Champion: (Spain) Marcel Granollers
- Runner-up: (Argentina) Juan Mónaco
- Score: 6–2, 4–6, 7–6^{(7–3)}

Details
- Draw: 32
- Seeds: 8

Events
Singles	Doubles
← 2010 ·	Valencia Open	· 2012 →

David Ferrer was the defending champion, but lost in the semifinals to Juan Mónaco.

Marcel Granollers won the title, defeating Juan Mónaco 6–2, 4–6, 7–6^{(7–3)} in the final.

== Seeds ==
1. (Spain) David Ferrer (semifinals)
2. (France) Jo-Wilfried Tsonga (second round)
3. (France) Gaël Monfils (quarterfinals)
4. (Spain) Nicolás Almagro (first round)
5. (France) Gilles Simon (first round)
6. (Argentina) Juan Martín del Potro (semifinals)
7. (Ukraine) Alexandr Dolgopolov (first round)
8. (Spain) Feliciano López (first round)

== Draw ==
=== Key ===
- Q = Qualifier
- WC = Wild card
- LL = Lucky loser
- Alt = Alternate
- SE = Special exempt
- PR = Protected ranking
- ITF = ITF entry
- JE = Junior exempt
- w/o = Walkover
- r = Retired
- d = Defaulted
- SR = Special ranking

=== Finals ===
Semifinals
1	(Spain) David Ferrer	5	6	3
WC	(Argentina) Juan Mónaco	7	1	6
(Spain) Marcel Granollers	6	7^{7}
6	(Argentina) Juan Martín del Potro	4	6^{4}

Final
WC	(Argentina) Juan Mónaco	2	6	6^{3}
(Spain) Marcel Granollers	6	4	7^{7}

=== Top half ===
First round
1	(Spain) D Ferrer	6	6
(Spain) F Verdasco	3	2
Q	(Canada) V Pospisil	6	3	7^{11}
(United States) J Isner	3	6	6^{9}
Q	(France) N Mahut	7^{7}	6
(Spain) G García-López	6^{5}	2
(Russia) N Davydenko	6	4	6
5	(France) G Simon	4	6	3
4	(Spain) N Almagro	4	6	4
WC	(Argentina) J Mónaco	6	3	6
WC	(Spain) D Gimeno-Traver	4	3
(Italy) F Fognini	6	6
Q	(Russia) I Kunitsyn	4	6^{2}
(Spain) JC Ferrero	6	7^{7}
(United States) A Bogomolov Jr.	4	6	7^{7}
8	(Spain) F López	6	4	6^{2}

Second round
1	(Spain) D Ferrer	6	6
Q	(Canada) V Pospisil	3	3
Q	(France) N Mahut
(Russia) N Davydenko	w/o
WC	(Argentina) J Mónaco	6	6
(Italy) F Fognini	3	1
(Spain) JC Ferrero	7^{7}	4	6
(United States) A Bogomolov Jr.	6^{3}	6	2

Quarterfinals
1	(Spain) D Ferrer	6	6
(Russia) N Davydenko	3	4
WC	(Argentina) J Mónaco	6	6
(Spain) JC Ferrero	3	3

Semifinals
1	(Spain) D Ferrer	5	6	3
WC	(Argentina) J Mónaco	7	1	6

=== Bottom half ===
First round
7	(Ukraine) A Dolgopolov	3	4
(Spain) M Granollers	6	6
(Croatia) M Čilić	6	6
(Canada) M Raonic	4	4
(Argentina) JI Chela	0	6^{7}
(Spain) P Andújar	6	7^{9}
(Spain) A Montañés	3	1
3	(France) G Monfils	6	6
6	(Argentina) JM del Potro	6	6
(Russia) D Tursunov	4	1
(South Africa) K Anderson	6	6
Q	(Slovakia) M Kližan	1	4
(United States) S Querrey	6	6
(Latvia) E Gulbis	3	4
WC	(Spain) J Martí	6	5	2
2	(France) J-W Tsonga	4	7	6

Second round
(Spain) M Granollers	3	6	7
(Croatia) M Čilić	6	3	5
(Spain) P Andújar	2	6^{5}
3	(France) G Monfils	6	7^{7}
6	(Argentina) JM del Potro	6	6
(South Africa) K Anderson	4	4
(United States) S Querrey	7^{7}	6
2	(France) J-W Tsonga	6^{5}	2

Quarterfinals
(Spain) M Granollers	7^{14}	3	6
3	(France) G Monfils	6^{12}	6	4
6	(Argentina) JM del Potro	6	7
(United States) S Querrey	2	5

Semifinals
(Spain) M Granollers	6	7^{7}
6	(Argentina) JM del Potro	4	6^{4}

== Qualifying ==
=== Seeds ===
1. (Russia) Igor Kunitsyn (qualified)
2. (Spain) Albert Ramos (qualifying competition)
3. (United States) Ryan Sweeting (first round)
4. (Spain) Pere Riba (qualifying competition)
5. (Slovakia) Martin Kližan (qualified)
6. (France) Édouard Roger-Vasselin (first round)
7. (France) Nicolas Mahut (qualified)
8. (France) Benoît Paire (first round)

=== Qualifiers ===
1. (Russia) Igor Kunitsyn
2. (Slovakia) Martin Kližan
3. (France) Nicolas Mahut
4. (Canada) Vasek Pospisil

=== Qualifying draw ===
==== First qualifier ====
First round
1	(Russia) Igor Kunitsyn	6	6
WC	(Spain) David Estruch	1	2
WC	(Spain) Roberto Bautista-Agut	6	6
8	(France) Benoît Paire	3	1

Qualifying competition
1	(Russia) Igor Kunitsyn	6	7^{8}
WC	(Spain) Roberto Bautista-Agut	4	6^{6}

==== Second qualifier ====
First round
2	(Spain) Albert Ramos	6	6
(Russia) Teymuraz Gabashvili	3	3
(Spain) Arnau Brugués-Davi	6^{2}	7^{7}	1
5	(Slovakia) Martin Kližan	7^{7}	6^{1}	6

Qualifying competition
2	(Spain) Albert Ramos	4	6	4
5	(Slovakia) Martin Kližan	6	1	6

==== Third qualifier ====
First round
3	(United States) Ryan Sweeting	4	4
(Italy) Simone Bolelli	6	6
WC	(Spain) Andrés Artuñedo	3	3
7	(France) Nicolas Mahut	6	6

Qualifying competition
(Italy) Simone Bolelli	7^{11}	4	5
7	(France) Nicolas Mahut	6^{9}	6	7

==== Fourth qualifier ====
First round
4	(Spain) Pere Riba	7	6
(United Kingdom) James Ward	5	4
(Canada) Vasek Pospisil	7^{7}	6
6	(France) Édouard Roger-Vasselin	6^{4}	4

Qualifying competition
4	(Spain) Pere Riba	0	1^{r}
(Canada) Vasek Pospisil	6	2
