= 2014 Valencia Open 500 – Doubles =

Doubles
- 2014 Valencia Open 500

Final
- Champions: (Netherlands) Jean-Julien Rojer (Romania) Horia Tecău
- Runners-up: (South Africa) Kevin Anderson (France) Jérémy Chardy
- Score: 6–4, 6–2

Details
- Draw: 16
- Seeds: 4

Events
Singles	Doubles
← 2013 ·	Valencia Open	· 2015 →

Alexander Peya and Bruno Soares were the defending champions, but lost in the opening round to Leonardo Mayer and João Sousa.
Jean-Julien Rojer and Horia Tecău won the title, defeating Kevin Anderson and Jérémy Chardy in the final, 6–4, 6–2.

== Seeds ==
1. (Austria) Alexander Peya / (Brazil) Bruno Soares (first round)
2. (Spain) Marcel Granollers / (Spain) Marc López (withdrew because of Granollers's right abdominal injury)
3. (Spain) David Marrero / (Spain) Fernando Verdasco (quarterfinals)
4. (Netherlands) Jean-Julien Rojer / (Romania) Horia Tecău (champions)

== Draw ==
=== Key ===
- Q = Qualifier
- WC = Wild card
- LL = Lucky loser
- Alt = Alternate
- SE = Special exempt
- PR = Protected ranking
- ITF = ITF entry
- JE = Junior exempt
- w/o = Walkover
- r = Retired
- d = Defaulted
- SR = Special ranking

=== Draw ===
First round
1	(Austria) A Peya (Brazil) B Soares	6	1	[7]
(Argentina) L Mayer (Portugal) J Sousa	3	6	[10]
PR	(Philippines) T Huey (Austria) J Melzer	5	7^{7}	[4]
(Italy) F Fognini (Italy) A Seppi	7	6^{5}	[10]
4	(Netherlands) J-J Rojer (Romania) H Tecău	6	6
(Colombia) S Giraldo (Austria) O Marach	4	4
(United States) E Butorac (South Africa) R Klaasen	6^{4}	3
Q	(United States) A Krajicek (United States) N Monroe	7^{7}	6
(Spain) F López (Belarus) M Mirnyi	4	6^{2}
(South Africa) K Anderson (France) J Chardy	6	7^{7}
WC	(Spain) P Andujar (Spain) D Gimeno-Traver	4	4
3	(Spain) D Marrero (Spain) F Verdasco	6	6
WC	(Spain) P Carreño Busta (Spain) G García-López	6	6
(United States) J Isner (United States) J Sock	3	3
(Colombia) JS Cabal (Colombia) R Farah	6^{3}	5
LL	(Spain) I Cervantes (Spain) P Riba	7^{7}	7

Quarterfinals
(Argentina) L Mayer (Portugal) J Sousa	7	6
(Italy) F Fognini (Italy) A Seppi	5	1
4	(Netherlands) J-J Rojer (Romania) H Tecău	6	7
Q	(United States) A Krajicek (United States) N Monroe	3	5
(South Africa) K Anderson (France) J Chardy	6	6
3	(Spain) D Marrero (Spain) F Verdasco	2	4
WC	(Spain) P Carreño Busta (Spain) G García-López	7^{7}	6
LL	(Spain) I Cervantes (Spain) P Riba	6^{3}	3

Semifinals
(Argentina) L Mayer (Portugal) J Sousa	4	6^{3}
4	(Netherlands) J-J Rojer (Romania) H Tecău	6	7^{7}
(South Africa) K Anderson (France) J Chardy	6	6
WC	(Spain) P Carreño Busta (Spain) G García-López	3	4

Final
4	(Netherlands) J-J Rojer (Romania) H Tecău	6	6
(South Africa) K Anderson (France) J Chardy	4	2

== Qualifying ==
=== Qualifying seeds ===
1. (United States) Austin Krajicek / (United States) Nicholas Monroe (qualified)
2. (United States) James Cerretani / (Brazil) André Sá (first round)

=== Qualifiers ===
1. (United States) Austin Krajicek / (United States) Nicholas Monroe

=== Lucky losers ===
1. (Spain) Iñigo Cervantes / (Spain) Pere Riba

=== Qualifying draw ===
First round					Qualifying competition
1	(United States) Austin Krajicek (United States) Nicholas Monroe	6	6^{7}	[10]
	(Colombia) Nicolás Barrientos (Colombia) Alejandro Falla	3	7^{9}	[2]	1	(United States) Austin Krajicek (United States) Nicholas Monroe	6	6
	(Spain) Iñigo Cervantes (Spain) Pere Riba	3	7	[10]		(Spain) Iñigo Cervantes (Spain) Pere Riba	2	4
2	(United States) James Cerretani (Brazil) André Sá	6	5	[3]
