= 2015 Valencia Open =

- Date: 26 October – 1 November
- Edition: 21st
- Category: World Tour 250
- Draw: 28S / 16D
- Prize money: €537,050
- Surface: Hard / indoor
- Location: Valencia, Spain
- Venue: Ciutat de les Arts i les Ciències

Champions

Singles
- (Portugal) João Sousa

Doubles
- (United States) Eric Butorac / (United States) Scott Lipsky
- Valencia Open

The 2015 Valencia Open was a men's tennis tournament played on indoor hard courts. It was the 21st and the last edition of the Valencia Open, part of the 250 Series of the 2015 ATP World Tour. The tournament was formerly part of the ATP World Tour 500 series but was downgraded starting in 2015. It was held at the Ciutat de les Arts i les Ciències in Valencia, Spain, from 26 October through 1 November 2015. Unseeded João Sousa won the singles title.

== Singles main-draw entrants ==
=== Seeds ===
Country	Player	Rank^{1}	Seed
~~ESP~~	~~David Ferrer~~	~~8~~	~~1~~
ESP	Feliciano López	17	2
AUS	Bernard Tomic	18	3
ITA	Fabio Fognini	22	4
FRA	Benoît Paire	23	5
ESP	Guillermo García López	25	6
ESP	Roberto Bautista Agut	27	7
FRA	Jérémy Chardy	29	8

- Rankings are as of October 19, 2015

=== Other entrants ===
The following players received wildcards into the singles main draw:

- (Spain) Nicolás Almagro
- (Spain) Marcel Granollers
- (Russia) Andrey Rublev

The following players received entry from the qualifying draw:

- (Germany) Mischa Zverev
- (Poland) Michał Przysiężny
- (Germany) Daniel Brands
- (Japan) Taro Daniel

The following player received entry as a lucky loser:

- (Slovakia) Norbert Gombos
- (Spain) Albert Montañés

=== Withdrawals ===
Before the tournament

- (United States) Sam Querrey →replaced by Aljaž Bedene
- (Spain) Pablo Andújar (elbow injury)→replaced by Norbert Gombos
- (Spain) David Ferrer (right elbow injury)→replaced by Albert Montañés

== Doubles main-draw entrants ==
=== Seeds ===
Country	Player	Country	Player	Rank^{1}	Seed
RSA	Raven Klaasen	USA	Rajeev Ram	58	1
POL	Łukasz Kubot	IND	Leander Paes	63	2
URU	Pablo Cuevas	ESP	Marcel Granollers	65	3
ESP	Feliciano López	BLR	Max Mirnyi	72	4

- Rankings are as of October 19, 2015

=== Other entrants ===
The following pairs received wildcards into the doubles main draw:

- (Spain) Pablo Carreño Busta / (Argentina) Federico Delbonis
- (Brazil) Eduardo Russi Assumpção / (Spain) Mario Vilella Martínez

== Finals ==
=== Singles ===
- (Portugal) João Sousa defeated (Spain) Roberto Bautista Agut, 3–6, 6–3, 6–4
- It was Sousa's 1st singles title of the year and the 2nd of his career.

=== Doubles ===
- (United States) Eric Butorac / (United States) Scott Lipsky defeated (Spain) Feliciano López / (Belarus) Max Mirnyi, 7–6^{(7–4)}, 6–3
