= 2010 Valencia Open 500 – Doubles =

Doubles
- 2010 Valencia Open 500

Final
- Champions: (United Kingdom) Andy Murray (United Kingdom) Jamie Murray
- Runners-up: (India) Mahesh Bhupathi (Belarus) Max Mirnyi
- Score: 7–6^{(10–8)}, 5–7, [10–7]

Details
- Draw: 16
- Seeds: 4

Events
Singles	Doubles
← 2009 ·	Valencia Open	· 2011 →

František Čermák and Michal Mertiňák were the defending champions, however they lost to Mahesh Bhupathi and Max Mirnyi in the quarterfinals.
British wildcard pair Andy and Jamie Murray won the title, defeating Bhupathi and Mirnyi 7–6^{(10–8)}, 5–7, [10–7] in the final.

== Seeds ==
1. (Poland) Łukasz Kubot / (Austria) Oliver Marach (semifinals)
2. (Poland) Mariusz Fyrstenberg / (Poland) Marcin Matkowski (first round)
3. (India) Mahesh Bhupathi / (Belarus) Max Mirnyi (final)
4. (India) Rohan Bopanna / (Pakistan) Aisam-ul-Haq Qureshi (quarterfinals)

== Draw ==
=== Key ===
- Q = Qualifier
- WC = Wild card
- LL = Lucky loser
- Alt = Alternate
- SE = Special exempt
- PR = Protected ranking
- ITF = ITF entry
- JE = Junior exempt
- w/o = Walkover
- r = Retired
- d = Defaulted
- SR = Special ranking

=== Draw ===
First round
1	(Poland) Ł Kubot (Austria) O Marach	6	6
(Spain) G García-López (Spain) A Montañés	1	0
(South Africa) W Moodie (Belgium) D Norman	6	7^{7}
(Spain) N Almagro (Spain) S Ventura	3	6^{1}
3	(India) M Bhupathi (Belarus) M Mirnyi	6	6
(Israel) J Erlich (Switzerland) S Wawrinka	3	3
(Brazil) M Melo (Brazil) B Soares	2	6	[6]
(Czech Republic) F Čermák (Slovakia) M Mertiňák	6	3	[10]
(Spain) M López (Spain) D Marrero	6	4	[10]
WC	(Spain) M Granollers (Spain) I Navarro	4	6	[8]
(Uruguay) P Cuevas (Argentina) J Mónaco	6^{6}	6	[12]
4	(India) R Bopanna (Pakistan) A-u-H Qureshi	7^{8}	4	[14]
(Spain) F López (Spain) F Verdasco	3	6^{3}
WC	(United Kingdom) A Murray (United Kingdom) J Murray	6	7^{7}
ALT	(Argentina) JI Chela (Argentina) E Schwank	6	1	[12]
2	(Poland) M Fyrstenberg (Poland) M Matkowski	0	6	[10]

Quarterfinals
1	(Poland) Ł Kubot (Austria) O Marach	7^{7}	4	[10]
(South Africa) W Moodie (Belgium) D Norman	6^{5}	6	[4]
3	(India) M Bhupathi (Belarus) M Mirnyi	6	6^{6}	[10]
(Czech Republic) F Čermák (Slovakia) M Mertiňák	3	7^{8}	[6]
(Spain) M López (Spain) D Marrero	6	6
4	(India) R Bopanna (Pakistan) A-u-H Qureshi	2	4
WC	(United Kingdom) A Murray (United Kingdom) J Murray	6	6
ALT	(Argentina) JI Chela (Argentina) E Schwank	2	2

Semifinals
1	(Poland) Ł Kubot (Austria) O Marach	6^{3}	4
3	(India) M Bhupathi (Belarus) M Mirnyi	7^{7}	6
(Spain) M López (Spain) D Marrero	5	2
WC	(United Kingdom) A Murray (United Kingdom) J Murray	7	6

Final
3	(India) M Bhupathi (Belarus) M Mirnyi	6^{8}	7	[7]
WC	(United Kingdom) A Murray (United Kingdom) J Murray	7^{10}	5	[10]
