= 2015 Valencia Open – Singles =

Singles
- 2015 Valencia Open

Final
- Champion: (Portugal) João Sousa
- Runner-up: (Spain) Roberto Bautista Agut
- Score: 3–6, 6–3, 6–4

Details
- Draw: 28
- Seeds: 8

Events
Singles	Doubles
← 2014 ·	Valencia Open

Andy Murray was the defending champion, but chose not to participate this year.

João Sousa won the title, defeating Roberto Bautista Agut in the final in three sets, 3–6, 6–3, 6–4.

== Seeds ==
The top four seeds received a bye into the second round.

1. (Spain) David Ferrer (withdrew)
2. (Spain) Feliciano López (second round)
3. (Australia) Bernard Tomic (second round)
4. (Italy) Fabio Fognini (second round)
5. (France) Benoît Paire (second round)
6. (Spain) Guillermo García López (quarterfinals)
7. (Spain) Roberto Bautista Agut (final)
8. (France) Jérémy Chardy (first round)

== Draw ==
=== Key ===
- Q = Qualifier
- WC = Wild card
- LL = Lucky loser
- Alt = Alternate
- SE = Special exempt
- PR = Protected ranking
- ITF = ITF entry
- JE = Junior exempt
- w/o = Walkover
- r = Retired
- d = Defaulted
- SR = Special ranking

=== Finals ===
Semifinals
(Canada) Vasek Pospisil	4	4
(Portugal) João Sousa	6	6
7	(Spain) Roberto Bautista Agut	4	6	7^{10}
(United States) Steve Johnson	6	3	6^{8}

Final
(Portugal) João Sousa	3	6	6
7	(Spain) Roberto Bautista Agut	6	3	4

=== Top half ===
First round
(Australia) N Kyrgios	4	6	6^{3}
Q	(Germany) D Brands	6	2	7^{7}
(Canada) V Pospisil	6	6
(Colombia) S Giraldo	4	3
(United Kingdom) A Bedene	3	6	6
8	(France) J Chardy	6	2	1
(Uruguay) P Cuevas	6	6
(Spain) P Carreño Busta	2	3
(Portugal) J Sousa	7^{11}	6
(Luxembourg) G Müller	6^{9}	3
LL	(Slovakia) N Gombos	6	3	4
5	(France) B Paire	3	6	6

Second round
LL	(Spain) A Montañés	2	2
Q	(Germany) D Brands	6	6
(Canada) V Pospisil	6	6
(United Kingdom) A Bedene	3	4
3	(Australia) B Tomic	6	3	4
(Uruguay) P Cuevas	3	6	6
(Portugal) J Sousa	6	2	6
5	(France) B Paire	3	6	3

Quarterfinals
Q	(Germany) D Brands	3	3
(Canada) V Pospisil	6	6
(Uruguay) P Cuevas	4	4
(Portugal) J Sousa	6	6

Semifinals
(Canada) V Pospisil	4	4
(Portugal) J Sousa	6	6

=== Bottom half ===
First round
7	(Spain) R Bautista Agut	7^{7}	4	6
WC	(Spain) N Almagro	6^{1}	6	4
WC	(Spain) M Granollers	4	4
WC	(Russia) A Rublev	6	6
(Brazil) T Bellucci	6^{4}	7^{7}	6^{5}
Q	(Germany) M Zverev	7^{7}	6^{2}	7^{7}
6	(Spain) G García López	6	3	6
(Spain) F Verdasco	4	6	3
Q	(Poland) M Przysiężny	6	6^{2}	3
Q	(Japan) T Daniel	4	7^{7}	6
(United States) S Johnson	6	6
(Slovakia) M Kližan	3	4

Second round
7	(Spain) R Bautista Agut	6	6
WC	(Russia) A Rublev	2	3
Q	(Germany) M Zverev	6	7^{7}
4	(Italy) F Fognini	2	6^{3}
6	(Spain) G García López	6	6
Q	(Japan) T Daniel	3	4
(United States) S Johnson	6	7^{7}
2	(Spain) F López	4	6^{3}

Quarterfinals
7	(Spain) R Bautista Agut	6	6
Q	(Germany) M Zverev	4	3
6	(Spain) G García López	5	4
(United States) S Johnson	7	6

Semifinals
7	(Spain) R Bautista Agut	4	6	7^{10}
(United States) S Johnson	6	3	6^{8}

== Qualifying ==
=== Seeds ===
1. (Argentina) Federico Delbonis (first round)
2. (Spain) Pablo Carreño Busta (moved to main draw)
3. (Australia) Thanasi Kokkinakis (second round)
4. (Spain) Daniel Gimeno Traver (first round)
5. (United States) Rajeev Ram (second round)
6. (Spain) Íñigo Cervantes (first round)
7. (Germany) Jan-Lennard Struff (second round)
8. (Spain) Albert Montañés (qualifying competition, lucky loser)

=== Qualifiers ===
1. (Germany) Mischa Zverev
2. (Poland) Michał Przysiężny
3. (Germany) Daniel Brands
4. (Japan) Taro Daniel

=== Lucky losers ===
1. (Slovakia) Norbert Gombos
2. (Spain) Albert Montañés

=== Qualifying draw ===
==== First qualifier ====
First round
1	(Argentina) Federico Delbonis	2	0
(Germany) Mischa Zverev	6	6
(Spain) Mario Vilella Martínez	6	4	6
WC	(Spain) Pedro Martínez	1	6	3
WC	(Germany) Nicola Kuhn	2	3
(Japan) Yūichi Sugita	6	6
(France) Kenny de Schepper	1	4
7	(Germany) Jan-Lennard Struff	6	6

Second round
(Germany) Mischa Zverev	6	6
(Spain) Mario Vilella Martínez	4	3
(Japan) Yūichi Sugita	2	6	6
7	(Germany) Jan-Lennard Struff	6	3	4

Qualifying competition
(Germany) Mischa Zverev	6	6
(Japan) Yūichi Sugita	4	1

==== Second qualifier ====
First round
Alt	(Spain) Carlos Taberner	6	7
WC	(Brazil) Jordan Correia Passos do Carmo	4	5
(Poland) Michał Przysiężny	6	6
(Spain) Javier Martí	3	0
(France) Quentin Halys	3	6	6
(Spain) Oriol Roca Batalla	6	3	3
(France) Calvin Hemery	4	5
5	(United States) Rajeev Ram	6	7

Second round
Alt	(Spain) Carlos Taberner	4	4
(Poland) Michał Przysiężny	6	6
(France) Quentin Halys	7^{7}	7^{7}
5	(United States) Rajeev Ram	6^{4}	6^{1}

Qualifying competition
(Poland) Michał Przysiężny	7^{8}	6
(France) Quentin Halys	6^{6}	2

==== Third qualifier ====
First round
3	(Australia) Thanasi Kokkinakis	6	6
(Spain) Albert Alcaraz Ivorra	2	4
WC	(Spain) Bernabé Zapata Miralles	0	2
(Germany) Daniel Brands	6	6
(Russia) Ivan Gakhov	2	1
(Germany) Tobias Kamke	6	6
(Georgia (country)) Aleksandre Metreveli	3	6^{0}
8	(Spain) Albert Montañés	6	7^{7}

Second round
3	(Australia) Thanasi Kokkinakis	3	1
(Germany) Daniel Brands	6	6
(Germany) Tobias Kamke	3	6	5
8	(Spain) Albert Montañés	6	3	7

Qualifying competition
(Germany) Daniel Brands	6	6
8	(Spain) Albert Montañés	3	2

==== Fourth qualifier ====
First round
4	(Spain) Daniel Gimeno Traver	5	3
(Spain) Marc Giner	7	6
(Japan) Taro Daniel	6	4
(Serbia) Laslo Djere	0	0^{r}
PR	(Spain) José Checa Calvo	2	1^{r}
(Slovakia) Jozef Kovalík	6	3
(Slovakia) Norbert Gombos	6	6
6	(Spain) Íñigo Cervantes	4	4

Second round
(Spain) Marc Giner	0	3
(Japan) Taro Daniel	6	6
(Slovakia) Jozef Kovalík	2	2
(Slovakia) Norbert Gombos	6	6

Qualifying competition
(Japan) Taro Daniel	6	6
(Slovakia) Norbert Gombos	4	3
