= 2011 Valencia Open 500 =

- Date: 31 October – 6 November
- Edition: 17th
- Category: ATP World Tour 500
- Draw: 32S / 16D
- Prize money: €1,357,000
- Surface: Hard / indoor
- Location: Valencia, Spain
- Venue: Ciutat de les Arts i les Ciències

Champions

Singles
- (Spain) Marcel Granollers

Doubles
- (United States) Bob Bryan / (United States) Mike Bryan
← 2010 ·	Valencia Open	· 2012 →

The 2011 Valencia Open 500 was a men's tennis tournament played on indoor hard courts. It was the 17th edition of the Open de Tenis Comunidad Valenciana, and was part of the 500 Series of the 2011 ATP World Tour. It was held at the Ciutat de les Arts i les Ciències in Valencia, Spain, from 31 October through 6 November 2011. Unseeded Marcel Granollers won the singles title.

== Players ==
=== Seeds ===
Country	Player	Rank^{1}	Seed
ESP	David Ferrer	5	1
FRA	Jo-Wilfried Tsonga	9	2
FRA	Gaël Monfils	10	3
ESP	Nicolás Almagro	11	4
FRA	Gilles Simon	12	5
ARG	Juan Martín del Potro	15	6
UKR	Alexandr Dolgopolov	16	7
ESP	Feliciano López	20	8

- Seeds are based on the rankings of October 24, 2011.

=== Other entrants ===
The following players received wildcards into the singles main draw:

- (Spain) Daniel Gimeno-Traver
- (Spain) Javier Martí
- (Argentina) Juan Mónaco

The following players received entry from the qualifying draw:

- (Slovakia) Martin Kližan
- (Russia) Igor Kunitsyn
- (France) Nicolas Mahut
- (Canada) Vasek Pospisil

== Finals ==
=== Singles ===
(Spain) Marcel Granollers defeated (Argentina) Juan Mónaco, 6–2, 4–6, 7–6^{(7–3)}

- It was Granollers' 2nd title of the year and 3rd of his career.

=== Doubles ===
(United States) Bob Bryan / (United States) Mike Bryan defeated (United States) Eric Butorac / (Curaçao) Jean-Julien Rojer, 6–4, 7–6^{(11–9)}
