= 2012 Valencia Open 500 – Singles =

Singles
- 2012 Valencia Open 500

Final
- Champion: (Spain) David Ferrer
- Runner-up: (Ukraine) Alexandr Dolgopolov
- Score: 6–1, 3–6, 6–4

Details
- Draw: 32
- Seeds: 8

Events
Singles	Doubles
← 2011 ·	Valencia Open	· 2013 →

Marcel Granollers was the defending champion, but lost to Alexandr Dolgopolov in the quarterfinals.

David Ferrer won the title, defeating Dolgopolov in the final, 6–1, 3–6, 6–4.

Former world No. 1 Juan Carlos Ferrero played his last match at the tournament losing to 6th seed Nicolás Almagro in the first round in straight sets.

== Seeds ==
1. (Spain) David Ferrer (champion)
2. (France) Jo-Wilfried Tsonga (first round, retired because of a back injury)
3. (Serbia) Janko Tipsarević (first round, retired because of a right shoulder injury)
4. (Argentina) Juan Mónaco (first round)
5. (United States) John Isner (second round)
6. (Spain) Nicolás Almagro (quarterfinals)
7. (Croatia) Marin Čilić (quarterfinals)
8. (Canada) Milos Raonic (first round)

== Draw ==
=== Key ===
- Q = Qualifier
- WC = Wild card
- LL = Lucky loser
- Alt = Alternate
- SE = Special exempt
- PR = Protected ranking
- ITF = ITF entry
- JE = Junior exempt
- w/o = Walkover
- r = Retired
- d = Defaulted
- SR = Special ranking

=== Finals ===
Semifinals
1	(Spain) David Ferrer	6	6^{5}	6
Q	(Croatia) Ivan Dodig	4	7^{7}	1
(Ukraine) Alexandr Dolgopolov	6	6
(Austria) Jürgen Melzer	4	2

Final
1	(Spain) David Ferrer	6	3	6
(Ukraine) Alexandr Dolgopolov	1	6	4

=== Top half ===
First round
1	(Spain) D Ferrer	7	7
Q	(Belgium) O Rochus	5	5
(Spain) A Ramos	6	6
Q	(United States) R Ram	3	3
(United States) S Querrey	6	7^{7}
(Spain) F López	3	6^{4}
WC	(Spain) JC Ferrero	5	3
6	(Spain) N Almagro	7	6
4	(Argentina) J Mónaco	3	4
WC	(Australia) L Hewitt	6	6
Q	(Croatia) I Dodig	6	7^{8}
(Germany) P Kohlschreiber	2	6^{6}
(Spain) F Verdasco	6	6
WC	(Spain) T Robredo	3	4
(Slovakia) M Kližan	6	0	3
7	(Croatia) M Čilić	1	6	6

Second round
1	(Spain) D Ferrer	6	6
(Spain) A Ramos	4	2
(United States) S Querrey	4	7^{7}	0
6	(Spain) N Almagro	6	6^{4}	6
WC	(Australia) L Hewitt	1	6	2
Q	(Croatia) I Dodig	6	3	6
(Spain) F Verdasco	1	4
7	(Croatia) M Čilić	6	6

Quarterfinals
1	(Spain) D Ferrer	6	7
6	(Spain) N Almagro	3	5
Q	(Croatia) I Dodig	6	7^{8}
7	(Croatia) M Čilić	2	6^{6}

Semifinals
1	(Spain) D Ferrer	6	6^{5}	6
Q	(Croatia) I Dodig	4	7^{7}	1

=== Bottom half ===
First round
8	(Canada) M Raonic	5	6^{1}
(Luxembourg) G Müller	7	7^{7}
(Ukraine) A Dolgopolov	6	7^{7}
(Italy) F Volandri	3	6^{5}
(Spain) M Granollers	7	6
Q	(Czech Republic) J Hájek	5	4
(France) G Simon	5
3	(Serbia) J Tipsarević	4^{r}
5	(United States) J Isner	6	6^{4}	7
(Italy) F Fognini	3	7^{7}	5
(Belgium) D Goffin	6	6
(Spain) P Andújar	2	2
(Austria) J Melzer	6	6
(Argentina) C Berlocq	3	3
(Belgium) X Malisse	3
2	(France) J-W Tsonga	1^{r}

Second round
(Luxembourg) G Müller	4	4
(Ukraine) A Dolgopolov	6	6
(Spain) M Granollers	6^{4}	6	6
(France) G Simon	7^{7}	3	2
5	(United States) J Isner	6^{2}	6	4
(Belgium) D Goffin	7^{7}	4	6
(Austria) J Melzer	7	6
(Belgium) X Malisse	5	2

Quarterfinals
(Ukraine) A Dolgopolov	6	6
(Spain) M Granollers	0	2
(Belgium) D Goffin	6^{7}	4
(Austria) J Melzer	7^{9}	6

Semifinals
(Ukraine) A Dolgopolov	6	6
(Austria) J Melzer	4	2

== Qualifying ==
=== Seeds ===
1. (Spain) Daniel Gimeno Traver (qualifying competition)
2. (Spain) Roberto Bautista Agut (qualifying competition)
3. (Italy) Flavio Cipolla (first round)
4. (Germany) Philipp Petzschner (qualifying competition)
5. (United States) Rajeev Ram (qualified)
6. (Lithuania) Ričardas Berankis (first round)
7. (Belgium) Olivier Rochus (qualified)
8. (Croatia) Ivan Dodig (qualified)

=== Qualifiers ===
1. (Czech Republic) Jan Hájek
2. (Belgium) Olivier Rochus
3. (Croatia) Ivan Dodig
4. (United States) Rajeev Ram

=== Draw ===
==== First qualifier ====
First round
1	(Spain) Daniel Gimeno Traver	7^{7}	4	7^{7}
(Canada) Vasek Pospisil	6^{4}	6	6^{2}
(Czech Republic) Jan Hájek	7^{7}	6
6	(Lithuania) Ričardas Berankis	6^{5}	2

Qualifying competition
1	(Spain) Daniel Gimeno Traver	4	6^{4}
(Czech Republic) Jan Hájek	6	7^{7}

==== Second qualifier ====
First round
2	(Spain) Roberto Bautista Agut	6	6
(Spain) Albert Montañés	2	2
(Belgium) Ruben Bemelmans	4	2
7	(Belgium) Olivier Rochus	6	6

Qualifying competition
2	(Spain) Roberto Bautista Agut	2	5
7	(Belgium) Olivier Rochus	6	7

==== Third qualifier ====
First round
3	(Italy) Flavio Cipolla	6^{5}	4
(Germany) Daniel Brands	7^{7}	6
WC	(Austria) Dominic Thiem	2	0
8	(Croatia) Ivan Dodig	6	6

Qualifying competition
(Germany) Daniel Brands	1	4
8	(Croatia) Ivan Dodig	6	6

==== Fourth qualifier ====
First round
4	(Germany) Philipp Petzschner	6	6
WC	(Spain) Mario Vilella Martínez	2	2
WC	(Spain) Sergio Gutiérrez Ferrol	3	3
5	(United States) Rajeev Ram	6	6

Qualifying competition
4	(Germany) Philipp Petzschner	6	4	4
5	(United States) Rajeev Ram	3	6	6
