= 2012 Valencia Open 500 =

- Date: 20–28 October
- Edition: 18th
- Category: ATP World Tour 500
- Draw: 32S / 16D
- Prize money: €1,424,850
- Surface: Hard
- Location: Valencia, Spain
- Venue: Ciutat de les Arts i les Ciències

Champions

Singles
- (Spain) David Ferrer

Doubles
- (Austria) Alexander Peya / (Brazil) Bruno Soares
← 2011 ·	Valencia Open	· 2013 →

The 2012 Valencia Open 500 was a men's tennis tournament played on indoor hard courts. It was the 18th edition of the Valencia Open, and part of the 500 Series of the 2012 ATP World Tour. It was held at the Ciutat de les Arts i les Ciències in Valencia, Spain, from 20 October through 28 October 2012. This was the last tournament before the retirement from tennis of Juan Carlos Ferrero. First-seeded David Ferrer won the singles title.

== Singles main-draw entrants ==
=== Seeds ===
Country	Player	Rank^{1}	Seed
ESP	David Ferrer	5	1
FRA	Jo-Wilfried Tsonga	7	2
SRB	Janko Tipsarević	9	3
ARG	Juan Mónaco	10	4
USA	John Isner	11	5
ESP	Nicolás Almagro	12	6
CRO	Marin Čilić	14	7
CAN	Milos Raonic	15	8

- Seeds are based on the rankings of October 15, 2012

=== Other entrants ===
The following players received wildcards into the singles main draw:

- (Spain) Juan Carlos Ferrero
- (Australia) Lleyton Hewitt
- (Spain) Javier Martí

The following players received entry from the qualifying draw:

- (Croatia) Ivan Dodig
- (Czech Republic) Jan Hájek
- (United States) Rajeev Ram
- (Belgium) Olivier Rochus

=== Withdrawals ===
- (Argentina) Juan Ignacio Chela
- (Colombia) Santiago Giraldo
- (Germany) Tommy Haas
- (France) Gaël Monfils
- (Argentina) David Nalbandian

=== Retirements ===
- (Serbia) Janko Tipsarević (right shoulder injury)
- (France) Jo-Wilfried Tsonga (back injury)

== Doubles main-draw entrants ==
=== Seeds ===
Country	Player	Country	Player	Rank^{1}	Seed
ESP	Marcel Granollers	ESP	Marc López	21	1
AUT	Alexander Peya	BRA	Bruno Soares	44	2
CRO	Ivan Dodig	BRA	Marcelo Melo	49	3
GBR	Colin Fleming	GBR	Ross Hutchins	53	4

- Rankings are as of October 15, 2012

=== Other entrants ===
The following pairs received wildcards into the doubles main draw:

- (Spain) Roberto Bautista Agut / (Spain) Daniel Gimeno Traver
- (Spain) David Ferrer / (Spain) Juan Carlos Ferrero

== Finals ==
=== Singles ===
- (Spain) David Ferrer defeated (Ukraine) Alexandr Dolgopolov, 6–1, 3–6, 6–4

=== Doubles ===
- (Austria) Alexander Peya / (Brazil) Bruno Soares defeated (Spain) David Marrero / (Spain) Fernando Verdasco, 6–3, 6–2
