= 2012 Valencia Open 500 – Doubles =

Doubles
- 2012 Valencia Open 500

Final
- Champions: (Austria) Alexander Peya (Brazil) Bruno Soares
- Runners-up: (Spain) David Marrero (Spain) Fernando Verdasco
- Score: 6–3, 6–2

Details
- Draw: 16
- Seeds: 4

Events
Singles	Doubles
← 2011 ·	Valencia Open	· 2013 →

Bob Bryan and Mike Bryan were the defending champions but decided not to participate.
Alexander Peya and Bruno Soares won the title, defeating David Marrero and Fernando Verdasco in the final, 6–3, 6–2.

== Seeds ==
1. (Spain) Marcel Granollers / (Spain) Marc López (quarterfinals)
2. (Austria) Alexander Peya / (Brazil) Bruno Soares (champions)
3. (Croatia) Ivan Dodig / (Brazil) Marcelo Melo (first round)
4. (United Kingdom) Colin Fleming / (United Kingdom) Ross Hutchins (first round)

== Draw ==
=== Key ===
- Q = Qualifier
- WC = Wild card
- LL = Lucky loser
- Alt = Alternate
- SE = Special exempt
- PR = Protected ranking
- ITF = ITF entry
- JE = Junior exempt
- w/o = Walkover
- r = Retired
- d = Defaulted
- SR = Special ranking

=== Draw ===
First round
1	(Spain) M Granollers (Spain) M López	6	6
(Germany) C Kas (Germany) P Kohlschreiber	4	2
WC	(Spain) R Bautista-Agut (Spain) D Gimeno-Traver	6	3	[8]
(Spain) D Marrero (Spain) F Verdasco	3	6	[10]
3	(Croatia) I Dodig (Brazil) M Melo	6^{3}	5
(Croatia) M Čilić (Brazil) A Sá	7^{7}	7
(Mexico) S González (United States) S Lipsky	7	6
(United States) J Isner (United States) S Querrey	5	1
(Argentina) C Berlocq (Ukraine) A Dolgopolov	6	3	[7]
WC	(Spain) D Ferrer (Spain) JC Ferrero	3	6	[10]
(Austria) J Knowle (Slovakia) F Polášek	4	6	[10]
4	(United Kingdom) C Fleming (United Kingdom) R Hutchins	6	4	[5]
(Austria) J Melzer (Germany) P Petzschner	4	4
(Slovakia) M Kližan (Slovakia) M Mertiňák	6	6
(Spain) P Andújar (Spain) F López	4	1
2	(Austria) A Peya (Brazil) B Soares	6	6

Quarterfinals
1	(Spain) M Granollers (Spain) M López	3	2
(Spain) D Marrero (Spain) F Verdasco	6	6
(Croatia) M Čilić (Brazil) A Sá	6^{0}	6	[7]
(Mexico) S González (United States) S Lipsky	7^{7}	2	[10]
WC	(Spain) D Ferrer (Spain) JC Ferrero	6	6^{2}	[10]
(Austria) J Knowle (Slovakia) F Polášek	3	7^{7}	[6]
(Slovakia) M Kližan (Slovakia) M Mertiňák	4	2
2	(Austria) A Peya (Brazil) B Soares	6	6

Semifinals
(Spain) D Marrero (Spain) F Verdasco	6	4	[10]
(Mexico) S González (United States) S Lipsky	3	6	[7]
WC	(Spain) D Ferrer (Spain) JC Ferrero	2	6^{3}
2	(Austria) A Peya (Brazil) B Soares	6	7^{7}

Final
(Spain) D Marrero (Spain) F Verdasco	3	2
2	(Austria) A Peya (Brazil) B Soares	6	6
