= 2015 Valencia Open – Doubles =

Doubles
- 2015 Valencia Open

Final
- Champions: (United States) Eric Butorac (United States) Scott Lipsky
- Runners-up: (Spain) Feliciano López (Belarus) Max Mirnyi
- Score: 7–6^{(7–4)}, 6–3

Events
Singles	Doubles
← 2014 ·	Valencia Open

Jean-Julien Rojer and Horia Tecău were the defending champions, but they chose to compete in Basel instead.

Eric Butorac and Scott Lipsky won the title, defeating Feliciano López and Max Mirnyi in the final 7–6^{(7–4)}, 6–3 .

== Seeds ==
1. (South Africa) Raven Klaasen / (United States) Rajeev Ram (first round)
2. (Poland) Łukasz Kubot / (India) Leander Paes (quarterfinals)
3. (Uruguay) Pablo Cuevas / (Spain) Marcel Granollers (first round)
4. (Spain) Feliciano López / (Belarus) Max Mirnyi (final)

== Draw ==
=== Key ===
- Q = Qualifier
- WC = Wild card
- LL = Lucky loser
- Alt = Alternate
- SE = Special exempt
- PR = Protected ranking
- ITF = ITF entry
- JE = Junior exempt
- w/o = Walkover
- r = Retired
- d = Defaulted
- SR = Special ranking

=== Draw ===
First round
1	(South Africa) R Klaasen (United States) R Ram	6	4	[4]
(Brazil) T Bellucci (United Kingdom) C Fleming	3	6	[10]
(Austria) J Knowle (Austria) O Marach	6	6
(United Kingdom) J Marray (Pakistan) A-u-H Qureshi	4	4
4	(Spain) F López (Belarus) M Mirnyi	6	7
(Croatia) M Pavić (New Zealand) M Venus	3	6^{5}
(Spain) G García López (Spain) D Marrero	3	7^{7}	[12]
PR	(Czech Republic) R Štěpánek (Australia) B Tomic	6	6^{5}	[10]
(Israel) J Erlich (Germany) P Petzschner	4	4
(United States) E Butorac (United States) S Lipsky	6	6
(Germany) A Begemann (New Zealand) A Sitak	2	6	[10]
3	(Uruguay) P Cuevas (Spain) M Granollers	6	3	[8]
WC	(Brazil) E Russi Assumpção (Spain) M Vilella Martínez	1	2
(Australia) C Guccione (Brazil) A Sá	6	6
WC	(Spain) P Carreño Busta (Argentina) F Delbonis	3	5
2	(Poland) Ł Kubot (India) L Paes	6	7

Quarterfinals
(Brazil) T Bellucci (United Kingdom) C Fleming	7^{13}	4	[8]
(Austria) J Knowle (Austria) O Marach	6^{11}	6	[10]
4	(Spain) F López (Belarus) M Mirnyi	4	6	[10]
(Spain) G García López (Spain) D Marrero	6	3	4
(United States) E Butorac (United States) S Lipsky	6	6
(Germany) A Begemann (New Zealand) A Sitak	4	4
(Australia) C Guccione (Brazil) A Sá	7^{8}	6
2	(Poland) Ł Kubot (India) L Paes	6^{6}	4

Semifinals
(Austria) J Knowle (Austria) O Marach	1	6	[6]
4	(Spain) F López (Belarus) M Mirnyi	6	3	[10]
(United States) E Butorac (United States) S Lipsky	7^{7}	7^{7}
(Australia) C Guccione (Brazil) A Sá	6^{4}	6^{3}

Final
4	(Spain) F López (Belarus) M Mirnyi	6^{4}	3
(United States) E Butorac (United States) S Lipsky	7^{7}	6
