= 2013 Valencia Open 500 – Doubles =

Doubles
- 2013 Valencia Open 500

Final
- Champions: (Austria) Alexander Peya (Brazil) Bruno Soares
- Runners-up: (United States) Bob Bryan (United States) Mike Bryan
- Score: 7–6^{(7–3)}, 6–7^{(1–7)}, [13-11]

Details
- Draw: 16
- Seeds: 4

Events
Singles	Doubles
← 2012 ·	Valencia Open	· 2014 →

Alexander Peya and Bruno Soares were the defending champions and successfully defended their title, defeating Bob Bryan and Mike Bryan in the final, 7–6^{(7–3)}, 6–7^{(1–7)}, [13–11].

== Seeds ==
1. (United States) Bob Bryan / (United States) Mike Bryan (final)
2. (Austria) Alexander Peya / (Brazil) Bruno Soares (champions)
3. (Spain) Marcel Granollers / (Spain) Marc López (first round)
4. (Spain) David Marrero / (Spain) Fernando Verdasco (quarterfinals)

== Draw ==
=== Key ===
- Q = Qualifier
- WC = Wild card
- LL = Lucky loser
- Alt = Alternate
- SE = Special exempt
- PR = Protected ranking
- ITF = ITF entry
- JE = Junior exempt
- w/o = Walkover
- r = Retired
- d = Defaulted
- SR = Special ranking

=== Draw ===
First round
1	(United States) B Bryan (United States) M Bryan	6	6
(Italy) D Bracciali (Italy) F Fognini	4	3
(Germany) C Kas (France) G Simon	6^{2}	7^{7}	[4]
(Mexico) S González (United States) S Lipsky	7^{7}	6^{2}	[10]
4	(Spain) D Marrero (Spain) F Verdasco	6	6^{9}	[10]
(South Africa) K Anderson (Israel) J Erlich	4	7^{11}	[5]
(Germany) T Haas (Brazil) A Sá	7	6
WC	(Spain) R Bautista-Agut (Spain) P Carreño Busta	5	1
(France) J Benneteau (Serbia) N Zimonjić	3	2
(United Kingdom) J Murray (Australia) J Peers	6	6
(Finland) J Nieminen (Russia) D Tursunov	6	3	[10]
3	(Spain) M Granollers (Spain) M López	2	6	[6]
(Germany) P Kohlschreiber (Germany) F Mayer	3	7^{9}	[7]
(United States) J Isner (Spain) F López	6	6^{7}	[10]
WC	(Spain) P Andújar (Spain) G García-López	4	6^{2}
2	(Austria) A Peya (Brazil) B Soares	6	7^{7}

Quarterfinals
1	(United States) B Bryan (United States) M Bryan	6	7
(Mexico) S González (United States) S Lipsky	4	5
4	(Spain) D Marrero (Spain) F Verdasco	1	3
(Germany) T Haas (Brazil) A Sá	6	6
(United Kingdom) J Murray (Australia) J Peers	6	6
(Finland) J Nieminen (Russia) D Tursunov	1	3
(United States) J Isner (Spain) F López	6	5	[5]
2	(Austria) A Peya (Brazil) B Soares	3	7	[10]

Semifinals
1	(United States) B Bryan (United States) M Bryan	6	6
(Germany) T Haas (Brazil) A Sá	3	4
(United Kingdom) J Murray (Australia) J Peers	3	6^{4}
2	(Austria) A Peya (Brazil) B Soares	6	7^{7}

Final
1	(United States) B Bryan (United States) M Bryan	6^{3}	7^{7}	[11]
2	(Austria) A Peya (Brazil) B Soares	7^{7}	6^{1}	[13]
