= 2010 Valencia Open 500 =

- Date: 31 October – 6 November
- Edition: 16th
- Category: ATP World Tour 500
- Draw: 32S / 16D
- Prize money: €1,357,000
- Surface: Hard / indoor
- Location: Valencia, Spain
- Venue: Ciutat de les Arts i les Ciències

Champions

Singles
- (Spain) David Ferrer

Doubles
- (United Kingdom) Andy Murray / (United Kingdom) Jamie Murray
← 2009 ·	Valencia Open	· 2011 →

The 2010 Valencia Open 500 was a men's tennis tournament played on indoor hard courts. It was the 16th edition of the Open de Tenis Comunidad Valenciana, and was part of the 500 Series of the 2010 ATP World Tour. It was held at the Ciutat de les Arts i les Ciències in Valencia, Spain, from 31 October through 6 November 2010. Fourth-seeded David Ferrer won the singles title.

== ATP players ==
=== Seeds ===
Country	Player	Rank^{1}	Seed
GBR	Andy Murray	4	1
SWE	Robin Söderling	5	2
ESP	Fernando Verdasco	7	3
ESP	David Ferrer	8	4
RUS	Mikhail Youzhny	10	5
RUS	Nikolay Davydenko	11	6
FRA	Jo-Wilfried Tsonga	13	7
FRA	Gaël Monfils	15	8

- Seeds are based on the rankings of October 25, 2010 and subject to change

=== Other entrants ===
The following players received wildcards into the singles main draw:

- (Spain) Pablo Andújar
- (Spain) Roberto Bautista Agut
- (Spain) Javier Martí

The following players received entry from the qualifying draw:

- (Uruguay) Pablo Cuevas
- (Russia) Teymuraz Gabashvili
- (France) Benoît Paire
- (United States) Michael Russell

The following player received entry as a Lucky loser:

- (Spain) Marcel Granollers
- (Spain) Albert Ramos Viñolas

== Finals ==
=== Singles ===
(Spain) David Ferrer defeated (Spain) Marcel Granollers, 7–5, 6–3

- It was Ferrer's 2nd title of the year and 9th of his career. It was his 2nd win at the event, also winning in 2008.

=== Doubles ===
(United Kingdom) Andy Murray / (United Kingdom) Jamie Murray defeated (India) Mahesh Bhupathi / (Belarus) Max Mirnyi, 7–6^{(10–8)}, 5–7, [10–7]
