= 2013 Valencia Open 500 – Singles =

Singles
- 2013 Valencia Open 500

Final
- Champion: (Russia) Mikhail Youzhny
- Runner-up: (Spain) David Ferrer
- Score: 6–3, 7–5

Details
- Draw: 32
- Seeds: 8

Events
Singles	Doubles
← 2012 ·	Valencia Open	· 2014 →

David Ferrer was the defending champion, but lost to Mikhail Youzhny in the final, 3–6, 5–7.

== Seeds ==
1. (Spain) David Ferrer (final)
2. (Germany) Tommy Haas (first round)
3. (Spain) Nicolás Almagro (semifinals)
4. (United States) John Isner (second round)
5. (Poland) Jerzy Janowicz (quarterfinals)
6. (France) Gilles Simon (first round)
7. (Italy) Fabio Fognini (quarterfinals)
8. (South Africa) Kevin Anderson (first round)

== Draw ==
=== Key ===
- Q = Qualifier
- WC = Wild card
- LL = Lucky loser
- Alt = Alternate
- SE = Special exempt
- PR = Protected ranking
- ITF = ITF entry
- JE = Junior exempt
- w/o = Walkover
- r = Retired
- d = Defaulted
- SR = Special ranking

=== Finals ===
Semifinals
1	(Spain) David Ferrer	6	6
3	(Spain) Nicolás Almagro	2	3
(Russia) Dmitry Tursunov	2	4
(Russia) Mikhail Youzhny	6	6

Final
1	(Spain) David Ferrer	3	5
(Russia) Mikhail Youzhny	6	7

=== Top half ===
First round
1	(Spain) D Ferrer	6	6
(France) G Monfils	3	2
(Spain) F López	3	1
(France) J Benneteau	6	6
WC	(Spain) G García López	3	5
Q	(Portugal) J Sousa	6	7
Q	(Spain) P Carreño Busta	5	6^{7}
5	(Poland) J Janowicz	7	7^{9}
3	(Spain) N Almagro	6	6
(Spain) P Andújar	2	3
WC	(Spain) F Verdasco	3	6^{1}
Q	(Poland) M Przysiężny	6	7^{7}
(Serbia) J Tipsarević	2^{r}
(Spain) M Granollers	1
(Slovakia) M Kližan	5	6	0
7	(Italy) F Fognini	7	3	6

Second round
1	(Spain) D Ferrer	6	6
(France) J Benneteau	2	1
Q	(Portugal) J Sousa	2	5
5	(Poland) J Janowicz	6	7
3	(Spain) N Almagro	6	7
Q	(Poland) M Przysiężny	4	5
(Spain) M Granollers	3	2
7	(Italy) F Fognini	6	6

Quarterfinals
1	(Spain) D Ferrer	6	4	6
5	(Poland) J Janowicz	4	6	0
3	(Spain) N Almagro	7^{8}	6
7	(Italy) F Fognini	6^{6}	2

Semifinals
1	(Spain) D Ferrer	6	6
3	(Spain) N Almagro	2	3

=== Bottom half ===
First round
8	(South Africa) K Anderson	6	6^{5}	3
WC	(Spain) R Bautista Agut	3	7^{7}	6
(Spain) A Montañés	4	1
(Russia) D Tursunov	6	6
(Germany) F Mayer	6	5	3
(France) J Chardy	4	7	6
(Latvia) E Gulbis	6^{4}	6^{2}
4	(United States) J Isner	7^{7}	7^{7}
6	(France) G Simon	1	0
Q	(Colombia) A Falla	6	6
(Finland) J Nieminen	6	6
(France) B Paire	3	3
(Russia) M Youzhny	3	6	4
(Australia) B Tomic	6	4	1^{r}
(Germany) P Kohlschreiber	3	6	6
2	(Germany) T Haas	6	3	3

Second round
WC	(Spain) R Bautista Agut	2	6^{3}
(Russia) D Tursunov	6	7^{7}
(France) J Chardy	7^{9}	6
4	(United States) J Isner	6^{7}	3
Q	(Colombia) A Falla	2	3
(Finland) J Nieminen	6	6
(Russia) M Youzhny	6	6
(Germany) P Kohlschreiber	4	3

Quarterfinals
(Russia) D Tursunov	6	6
(France) J Chardy	3	3
(Finland) J Nieminen	5	7^{7}	4
(Russia) M Youzhny	7	6^{4}	6

Semifinals
(Russia) D Tursunov	2	4
(Russia) M Youzhny	6	6

== Qualifying ==
=== Seeds ===
1. (Portugal) João Sousa (qualified)
2. (Spain) Pablo Carreño Busta (qualified)
3. (Poland) Michał Przysiężny (qualified)
4. (Spain) Albert Ramos (first round)
5. (Colombia) Santiago Giraldo (qualifying competition, retired)
6. (Colombia) Alejandro Falla (qualified)
7. (Germany) Peter Gojowczyk (qualifying competition)
8. (Italy) Thomas Fabbiano (first round)

=== Qualifiers ===
1. (Portugal) João Sousa
2. (Spain) Pablo Carreño Busta
3. (Poland) Michał Przysiężny
4. (Colombia) Alejandro Falla

=== Qualifying draw ===
==== First qualifier ====
First round
1	(Portugal) João Sousa	6	6
WC	(Spain) Marc Giner	2	0
(Slovakia) Kamil Čapkovič	5	1
7	(Germany) Peter Gojowczyk	7	6

Qualifying competition
1	(Portugal) João Sousa	4	6	6
7	(Germany) Peter Gojowczyk	6	4	3

==== Second qualifier ====
First round
2	(Spain) Pablo Carreño Busta	6	6
WC	(Spain) Mario Vilella Martínez	1	0
(Italy) Erik Crepaldi	3	6	2
5	(Colombia) Santiago Giraldo	6	4	6

Qualifying competition
2	(Spain) Pablo Carreño Busta	5	7^{7}	3
5	(Colombia) Santiago Giraldo	7	6^{4}	1^{r}

==== Third qualifier ====
First round
3	(Poland) Michał Przysiężny	6	3	6
WC	(United States) Bayo Philips	1	6	3
(Italy) Lorenzo Giustino	6	6
8	(Italy) Thomas Fabbiano	1	2

Qualifying competition
3	(Poland) Michał Przysiężny	6	6^{6}	6
(Italy) Lorenzo Giustino	2	7^{8}	1

==== Fourth qualifier ====
First round
4	(Spain) Albert Ramos	4	0
(France) Florent Serra	6	6
(Spain) Andrés Artuñedo	6^{3}	3
6	(Colombia) Alejandro Falla	7^{7}	6

Qualifying competition
(France) Florent Serra	5	6^{5}
6	(Colombia) Alejandro Falla	7	7^{7}
