= 2011 Valencia Open 500 – Doubles =

Doubles
- 2011 Valencia Open 500

Final
- Champions: (United States) Bob Bryan (United States) Mike Bryan
- Runners-up: (United States) Eric Butorac (Curaçao) Jean-Julien Rojer
- Score: 6–4, 7–6^{(11–9)}

Details
- Draw: 16
- Seeds: 4

Events
Singles	Doubles
← 2010 ·	Valencia Open	· 2012 →

Andy Murray and Jamie Murray were the defending champions but decided to participate at Basel instead. The brothers Bob and Mike Bryan became the new champions, defeating Eric Butorac and Jean-Julien Rojer in the final.

== Seeds ==
1. (United States) Bob Bryan / (United States) Mike Bryan (champions)
2. (Poland) Mariusz Fyrstenberg / (Poland) Marcin Matkowski (first round)
3. (Sweden) Robert Lindstedt / (Romania) Horia Tecău (first round)
4. (India) Rohan Bopanna / (Pakistan) Aisam-ul-Haq Qureshi (quarterfinals)

== Draw ==
=== Key ===
- Q = Qualifier
- WC = Wild card
- LL = Lucky loser
- Alt = Alternate
- SE = Special exempt
- PR = Protected ranking
- ITF = ITF entry
- JE = Junior exempt
- w/o = Walkover
- r = Retired
- d = Defaulted
- SR = Special ranking

=== Draw ===
First round
1	(United States) B Bryan (United States) M Bryan	6	6
(Czech Republic) L Dlouhý (Ukraine) A Dolgopolov	3	2
(Czech Republic) F Čermák (Slovakia) F Polášek	6^{5}	6	[10]
(Austria) O Marach (Spain) D Marrero	7^{7}	3	[5]
4	(India) R Bopanna (Pakistan) A-u-H Qureshi	6	7
(Spain) N Almagro (Spain) P Andújar	3	5
(Brazil) M Melo (Brazil) B Soares	6	6
WC	(Spain) R Bautista-Agut (Spain) A Ramos	1	0
(Argentina) JI Chela (Argentina) J Mónaco	4	6^{2}
(Spain) M Granollers (Spain) M López	6	7^{7}
(South Africa) K Anderson (United States) J Isner	7^{7}	6
3	(Sweden) R Lindstedt (Romania) H Tecău	6^{2}	4
WC	(Spain) D Gimeno-Traver (Spain) P Riba	3	6	[12]
(Spain) F López (Spain) F Verdasco	6	4	[10]
(United States) E Butorac (Curaçao) J-J Rojer	7	6
2	(Poland) M Fyrstenberg (Poland) M Matkowski	5	4

Quarterfinals
1	(United States) B Bryan (United States) M Bryan	6	6
(Czech Republic) F Čermák (Slovakia) F Polášek	3	4
4	(India) R Bopanna (Pakistan) A-u-H Qureshi	6	4	[8]
(Brazil) M Melo (Brazil) B Soares	0	6	[10]
(Spain) M Granollers (Spain) M López	7	5	[6]
(South Africa) K Anderson (United States) J Isner	5	7	[10]
WC	(Spain) D Gimeno-Traver (Spain) P Riba	6^{0}	5
(United States) E Butorac (Curaçao) J-J Rojer	7^{7}	7

Semifinals
1	(United States) B Bryan (United States) M Bryan	7^{7}	6
(Brazil) M Melo (Brazil) B Soares	6^{2}	1
(South Africa) K Anderson (United States) J Isner	6^{3}	6^{2}
(United States) E Butorac (Curaçao) J-J Rojer	7^{7}	7^{7}

Final
1	(United States) B Bryan (United States) M Bryan	6	7^{11}
(United States) E Butorac (Curaçao) J-J Rojer	4	6^{9}
