= 2014 Valencia Open 500 – Singles =

Singles
- 2014 Valencia Open 500

Final
- Champion: (United Kingdom) Andy Murray
- Runner-up: (Spain) Tommy Robredo
- Score: 3–6, 7–6^{(9–7)}, 7–6^{(10–8)}

Details
- Draw: 32
- Seeds: 8

Events
| Singles | Doubles |
| ← 2013 · | Valencia Open | · 2015 → |

Andy Murray defeated Tommy Robredo in the final, 3–6, 7–6^{(9–7)}, 7–6^{(10–8)} to win the singles tennis title at the 2014 Valencia Open. He saved five championship points en route to the title. This was the second final in five weeks where Murray defeated Robredo after saving championship points, having also done so at the Shenzhen Open.

Mikhail Youzhny was the defending champion, but lost to Thomaz Bellucci in the first round.

== Seeds ==
1. (Spain) David Ferrer (semifinals)
2. (Czech Republic) Tomáš Berdych (first round)
3. (United Kingdom) Andy Murray (champion)
4. (Spain) Feliciano López (second round)
5. (United States) John Isner (first round)
6. (Spain) Roberto Bautista Agut (second round, withdrew because of abdominal injury)
7. (South Africa) Kevin Anderson (quarterfinals)
8. (France) Gilles Simon (first round)

== Draw ==
Key

- Q = Qualifier
- WC = Wild card
- LL = Lucky loser
- Alt = Alternate
- ITF = ITF entry
- PR = Protected ranking
- SR = Special ranking
- SE = Special exempt
- JE = Junior exempt
- JR = Junior Accelerator Programme entrant
- CO = College Accelerator Programme entrant
- NG = Next Gen Accelerator Program entrant
- w/o = Walkover
- r = Retired
- d = Defaulted

=== Finals ===
Semifinals
1 | (Spain) David Ferrer | 4 | 5
3/WC | (United Kingdom) Andy Murray | 6 | 7
(France) Jérémy Chardy | 6^{7} | 6^{2}
(Spain) Tommy Robredo | 7^{9} | 7^{7}

Final
3/WC | (United Kingdom) Andy Murray | 3 | 7^{9} | 7^{10}
(Spain) Tommy Robredo | 6 | 6^{7} | 6^{8}

=== Top half ===
First round
1 | (Spain) D Ferrer | 6 | 7
(Italy) A Seppi | 3 | 5
(Spain) F Verdasco | 6 | 3 | 6
(Argentina) L Mayer | 4 | 6 | 3
Q | (Brazil) T Bellucci | 7 | 6
(Russia) M Youzhny | 5 | 3
(Colombia) S Giraldo | 4 | 4
6 | (Spain) R Bautista Agut | 6 | 6
3/WC | (United Kingdom) A Murray | 6 | 6
(Austria) J Melzer | 3 | 3
Q | (Spain) A Ramos-Viñolas | 4 | 2
(Italy) F Fognini | 6 | 6
WC | (United States) S Kozlov | 3 | 3
(Slovakia) M Kližan | 6 | 6
(Germany) P Kohlschreiber | 3 | 4
7 | (South Africa) K Anderson | 6 | 6

Second round
1 | (Spain) D Ferrer | 6 | 6
(Spain) F Verdasco | 3 | 2
Q | (Brazil) T Bellucci | w/o
6 | (Spain) R Bautista Agut
3/WC | (United Kingdom) A Murray | 6 | 6
(Italy) F Fognini | 2 | 4
(Slovakia) M Kližan
7 | (South Africa) K Anderson | w/o

Quarterfinals
1 | (Spain) D Ferrer | 6 | 6
Q | (Brazil) T Bellucci | 1 | 2
3/WC | (United Kingdom) A Murray | 6^{3} | 6 | 6
7 | (South Africa) K Anderson | 7^{7} | 4 | 4

Semifinals
1 | (Spain) D Ferrer | 4 | 5
3/WC | (United Kingdom) A Murray | 6 | 7

=== Bottom half ===
First round
8 | (France) G Simon | 0 | 3
(Ukraine) A Dolgopolov | 6 | 6
(France) J Chardy | 6 | 6
Q | (Tunisia) M Jaziri | 2 | 1
(Spain) M Granollers | 2 | 2^{r}
WC | (Spain) P Carreño Busta | 6 | 3
Q | (Slovakia) N Gomboš | 4 | 4
4 | (Spain) F López | 6 | 6
5 | (United States) J Isner | 6^{3} | 3
(Spain) T Robredo | 7^{7} | 6
(Chinese Taipei) Y-h Lu | 6 | 6
(Spain) G García-López | 2 | 3
(Serbia) D Lajović | 6 | 7^{10}
(Portugal) J Sousa | 3 | 6^{8}
(Spain) P Andújar | 6 | 6
2/WC | (Czech Republic) T Berdych | 3 | 2

Second round
(Ukraine) A Dolgopolov | 6 | 6^{4} | 5
(France) J Chardy | 3 | 7^{7} | 7
WC | (Spain) P Carreño Busta | 6 | 6
4 | (Spain) F López | 4 | 4
(Spain) T Robredo | 6 | 6
(Chinese Taipei) Y-h Lu | 2 | 4
(Serbia) D Lajović | 3 | 2
(Spain) P Andújar | 6 | 6

Quarterfinals
(France) J Chardy | 6 | 6
WC | (Spain) P Carreño Busta | 1 | 2
(Spain) T Robredo | 7^{7} | 6
(Spain) P Andújar | 6^{4} | 4

Semifinals
(France) J Chardy | 6^{7} | 6^{2}
(Spain) T Robredo | 7^{9} | 7^{7}

== Qualifying ==
=== Seeds ===
1. (Spain) Albert Ramos-Viñolas (qualified)
2. (Brazil) Thomaz Bellucci (qualified)
3. (Tunisia) Malek Jaziri (qualified)
4. (Colombia) Alejandro Falla (first round)
5. (Germany) Andreas Beck (first round)
6. (Germany) Peter Gojowczyk (qualifying competition)
7. (United Kingdom) James Ward (qualifying competition)
8. (Spain) Daniel Gimeno-Traver (first round)

=== Qualifiers ===
1. (Spain) Albert Ramos-Viñolas
2. (Brazil) Thomaz Bellucci
3. (Tunisia) Malek Jaziri
4. (Slovakia) Norbert Gomboš

=== Qualifying draw ===
==== First qualifier ====
First round
1 | (Spain) Albert Ramos-Viñolas | 6 | 7^{7}
WC | (Spain) Iñigo Cervantes | 2 | 6^{4}
WC | (Spain) Carlos Villanueva | 0 | 2
7 | (United Kingdom) James Ward | 6 | 6

Qualifying competition
1 | (Spain) Albert Ramos-Viñolas | 6 | 6
7 | (United Kingdom) James Ward | 3 | 2

==== Second qualifier ====
First round
2 | (Brazil) Thomaz Bellucci | 6 | 6
(Germany) Michael Berrer | 2 | 2
(Lithuania) Ričardas Berankis | 6 | 3 | 6
8 | (Spain) Daniel Gimeno-Traver | 3 | 6 | 3

Qualifying competition
2 | (Brazil) Thomaz Bellucci | 6 | 6
(Lithuania) Ričardas Berankis | 4 | 2

==== Third qualifier ====
First round
3 | (Tunisia) Malek Jaziri | 6 | 6
WC | (Brazil) Rafael Camilo | 2 | 4
(Turkey) Marsel İlhan | 6^{2} | 7^{7} | 6
5 | (Germany) Andreas Beck | 7^{7} | 6^{2} | 1

Qualifying competition
3 | (Tunisia) Malek Jaziri | 6 | 3 | 6
(Turkey) Marsel İlhan | 2 | 6 | 4

==== Fourth qualifier ====
First round
4 | (Colombia) Alejandro Falla | 3 | 2
(Slovakia) Norbert Gomboš | 6 | 6
(Spain) Pere Riba | 4 | 1
6 | (Germany) Peter Gojowczyk | 6 | 6

Qualifying competition
(Slovakia) Norbert Gomboš | 6 | 3 | 7
6 | (Germany) Peter Gojowczyk | 3 | 6 | 5
