= 2010 Valencia Open 500 – Singles =

Singles
- 2010 Valencia Open 500

Final
- Champion: (Spain) David Ferrer
- Runner-up: (Spain) Marcel Granollers
- Score: 7–5, 6–3

Details
- Draw: 32
- Seeds: 8

Events
Singles	Doubles
- Valencia Open

Andy Murray was the defending champion, but he was eliminated by Juan Mónaco in the second round.
4th seed David Ferrer defeated Lucky loser Marcel Granollers 7–5, 6–3 in the final match.

== Seeds ==
1. (United Kingdom) Andy Murray (second round)
2. (Sweden) Robin Söderling (semifinals)
3. (Spain) Fernando Verdasco (second round)
4. (Spain) David Ferrer (champion)
5. (Russia) Mikhail Youzhny (withdrew because of a back injury)
6. (Russia) Nikolay Davydenko (quarterfinals)
7. (France) Jo-Wilfried Tsonga (withdrew)
8. (France) Gaël Monfils (quarterfinals)

== Draw ==
Key

- Q = Qualifier
- WC = Wild card
- LL = Lucky loser
- Alt = Alternate
- ITF = ITF entry
- PR = Protected ranking
- SR = Special ranking
- SE = Special exempt
- JE = Junior exempt
- JR = Junior Accelerator Programme entrant
- CO = College Accelerator Programme entrant
- NG = Next Gen Accelerator Program entrant
- w/o = Walkover
- r = Retired
- d = Defaulted

=== Finals ===
Semifinals
LL	(Spain) Marcel Granollers	6	6
(France) Gilles Simon	4	4
4	(Spain) David Ferrer	6	3	6
2	(Sweden) Robin Söderling	3	6	3

Final
LL	(Spain) Marcel Granollers	5	3
4	(Spain) David Ferrer	7	6

=== Top half ===
First round
1	(United Kingdom) A Murray	6	7^{7}
(Spain) F López	3	6^{1}
(Argentina) J Mónaco	6	7^{9}
WC	(Spain) R Bautista-Agut	0	6^{7}
WC	(Spain) P Andújar	6	3	1
PR	(Russia) D Tursunov	4	6	1^{r}
Q	(France) B Paire	2	4
LL	(Spain) M Granollers	6	6
3	(Spain) F Verdasco	6	6
Q	(United States) M Russell	4	1
(Ukraine) S Stakhovsky	3	3
(France) G Simon	6	6
(Germany) P Kohlschreiber	2	6	2
(Argentina) JI Chela	6	3	6
WC	(Spain) J Martí	2	2
6	(Russia) N Davydenko	6	6

Second round
1	(United Kingdom) A Murray	2	6	2
(Argentina) J Mónaco	6	3	6
WC	(Spain) P Andújar	2	2
LL	(Spain) M Granollers	6	6
3	(Spain) F Verdasco	1	3
(France) G Simon	6	6
(Argentina) JI Chela	6^{0}	2
6	(Russia) N Davydenko	7^{7}	6

Quarterfinals
(Argentina) J Mónaco	6	3	4
LL	(Spain) M Granollers	1	6	6
(France) G Simon	6	6^{5}	6
6	(Russia) N Davydenko	4	7^{7}	3

Semifinals
LL	(Spain) M Granollers	6	6
(France) G Simon	4	4

=== Bottom half ===
First round
LL	(Spain) A Ramos-Viñolas	3	4
Q	(Uruguay) P Cuevas	6	6
(Romania) V Hănescu	6	4	2
(Italy) P Starace	4	6	6
Q	(Russia) T Gabashvili	6	6
(France) A Clément	4	2
(Spain) G García-López	7^{7}	3	3
4	(Spain) D Ferrer	6^{3}	6	6
8	(France) G Monfils	6	6
(Argentina) E Schwank	3	3
(Switzerland) S Wawrinka	7^{7}	7
(Italy) A Seppi	6^{2}	5
(Spain) N Almagro	4	6	3
(Spain) D Gimeno-Traver	6	3	6
(Spain) A Montañés	1	4
2	(Sweden) R Söderling	6	6

Second round
Q	(Uruguay) P Cuevas	6^{2}	6	2
(Italy) P Starace	7^{7}	2	6
Q	(Russia) T Gabashvili	4	1
4	(Spain) D Ferrer	6	6
8	(France) G Monfils	6	6
(Switzerland) S Wawrinka	2	4
(Spain) D Gimeno-Traver	2	3
2	(Sweden) R Söderling	6	6

Quarterfinals
(Italy) P Starace	5	4
4	(Spain) D Ferrer	7	6
8	(France) G Monfils	3	2
2	(Sweden) R Söderling	6	6

Semifinals
4	(Spain) D Ferrer	6	3	6
2	(Sweden) R Söderling	3	6	3

== Qualifying ==
=== Seeds ===
1. (Spain) Marcel Granollers (qualifying competition, lucky loser)
2. (Uruguay) Pablo Cuevas (qualified)
3. (Colombia) Alejandro Falla (first round)
4. (United States) Michael Russell (qualified)
5. (Germany) Mischa Zverev (qualifying competition)
6. (Portugal) Frederico Gil (first round)
7. (Russia) Teimuraz Gabashvili (qualified)
8. (Spain) Albert Ramos-Viñolas (qualifying competition, lucky loser)

=== Qualifiers ===
1. (Russia) Teimuraz Gabashvili
2. (Uruguay) Pablo Cuevas
3. (France) Benoît Paire
4. (United States) Michael Russell

=== Lucky losers ===
1. (Spain) Marcel Granollers
2. (Spain) Albert Ramos-Viñolas

=== Draw ===
==== First qualifier ====
First round
1	(Spain) Marcel Granollers	6	6
WC	(Spain) David Marrero	2	2
WC	(Egypt) Mohamed Safwat	1	1
7	(Russia) Teimuraz Gabashvili	6	6

Qualifying competition
1	(Spain) Marcel Granollers	6	6^{6}	5
7	(Russia) Teimuraz Gabashvili	4	7^{8}	7

==== Second qualifier ====
First round
2	(Uruguay) Pablo Cuevas	1	6	7
(Canada) Milos Raonic	6	4	5
(Czech Republic) Jaroslav Pospíšil	4	4
8	(Spain) Albert Ramos-Viñolas	6	6

Qualifying competition
2	(Uruguay) Pablo Cuevas	7	6
8	(Spain) Albert Ramos-Viñolas	5	3

==== Third qualifier ====
First round
3	(Colombia) Alejandro Falla	2	4
(France) Benoît Paire	6	6
(Spain) Iván Navarro	3	6	7^{7}
6	(Portugal) Frederico Gil	6	4	6^{4}

Qualifying competition
(France) Benoît Paire	2	6	6
(Spain) Iván Navarro	6	2	2

==== Fourth qualifier ====
First round
4	(United States) Michael Russell	7^{7}	2	6
(Republic of Ireland) Conor Niland	6^{5}	6	2
WC	(Spain) Marc Giner	6	1	0
5	(Germany) Mischa Zverev	4	6	6

Qualifying competition
4	(United States) Michael Russell	7	3	7
5	(Germany) Mischa Zverev	5	6	5
