= 2014 Valencia Open 500 =

- Date: 20–26 October
- Edition: 20th
- Category: ATP World Tour 500
- Draw: 32S / 16D
- Prize money: €1,615,780
- Surface: Hard / indoor
- Location: Valencia, Spain
- Venue: Ciutat de les Arts i les Ciències

Champions

Singles
- (United Kingdom) Andy Murray

Doubles
- (Netherlands) Jean-Julien Rojer / (Romania) Horia Tecău
- Valencia Open

The 2014 Valencia Open 500 was a men's tennis tournament played on indoor hard courts. It was the 20th edition of the Valencia Open, and part of the 500 Series of the 2014 ATP World Tour. It was held at the Ciutat de les Arts i les Ciències in Valencia, Spain, from 20 October through 26 October 2014. Third-seeded Andy Murray won the singles title.

== Finals ==
=== Singles ===
- (United Kingdom) Andy Murray defeated (Spain) Tommy Robredo, 3–6, 7–6^{(9–7)}, 7–6^{(10–8)}

=== Doubles ===
- (Netherlands) Jean-Julien Rojer / (Romania) Horia Tecău defeated (South Africa) Kevin Anderson / (France) Jérémy Chardy, 6–4, 6–2

== Points and prize money ==
=== Point distribution ===
| Event | W | F | SF | QF | Round of 16 | Round of 32 | Q | Q2 | Q1 |
| Singles | 500 | 300 | 180 | 90 | 45 | 0 | 20 | 10 | 0 |
| Doubles | 500 | 300 | 180 | 90 | 0 | —N/a | —N/a | —N/a | —N/a |

=== Prize money ===
| Event | W | F | SF | QF | Round of 16 | Round of 32 | Q2 | Q1 |
| Singles | €390,325 | €175,975 | €83,355 | €40,225 | €20,510 | €11,280 | €1,270 | €700 |
| Doubles | €115,300 | €52,000 | €24,530 | €11,860 | €6,090 | —N/a | —N/a | —N/a |

== Singles main-draw entrants ==
=== Seeds ===
| Country | Player | Rank^{1} | Seed |
|---|---|---|---|
| ESP | David Ferrer | 5 | 1 |
| CZE | Tomáš Berdych | 7 | 2 |
| GBR | Andy Murray | 11 | 3 |
| ESP | Feliciano López | 14 | 4 |
| USA | John Isner | 15 | 5 |
| ESP | Roberto Bautista Agut | 16 | 6 |
| RSA | Kevin Anderson | 17 | 7 |
| FRA | Gilles Simon | 18 | 8 |

- Rankings are as of October 13, 2014

=== Other entrants ===
The following players received wildcards into the singles main draw:

- (Czech Republic) Tomáš Berdych
- (Spain) Pablo Carreño Busta
- (United States) Stefan Kozlov
- (United Kingdom) Andy Murray

The following players received entry from the qualifying draw:

- (Brazil) Thomaz Bellucci
- (Slovakia) Norbert Gomboš
- (Tunisia) Malek Jaziri
- (Spain) Albert Ramos

=== Withdrawals ===
Before the tournament

- (Japan) Kei Nishikori
- (Czech Republic) Radek Štěpánek
- (Croatia) Marin Čilić
- (Russia) Dmitry Tursunov

During the tournament

- (Spain) Roberto Bautista Agut (abdominal injury)
- (Slovakia) Martin Kližan (wrist injury)

=== Retirements ===
- (Spain) Marcel Granollers (right abdominal injury)

== Doubles main-draw entrants ==
=== Seeds ===
| Country | Player | Country | Player | Rank^{1} | Seed |
|---|---|---|---|---|---|
| AUT | Alexander Peya | BRA | Bruno Soares | 10 | 1 |
| ~~ESP~~ | ~~Marcel Granollers~~ | ~~ESP~~ | ~~Marc López~~ | ~~21~~ | ~~2~~ |
| ESP | David Marrero | ESP | Fernando Verdasco | 33 | 3 |
| NED | Jean-Julien Rojer | ROU | Horia Tecău | 34 | 4 |

- Rankings are as of October 13, 2014

=== Other entrants ===
The following pairs received wildcards into the doubles main draw:

- (Spain) Pablo Andújar / (Spain) Daniel Gimeno Traver
- (Spain) Pablo Carreño Busta / (Spain) Guillermo García López

The following pair received entry from the qualifying draw:

- (United States) Austin Krajicek / (United States) Nicholas Monroe

The following pairs received entry as alternates:

- (Spain) Íñigo Cervantes / (Spain) Pere Riba

=== Withdrawals ===
- (Spain) Marcel Granollers (right abdominal injury)
