= 1995 Croatia Open Umag – Doubles =

Doubles
- 1995 Croatia Open Umag
- 1994 Champions: (Belgium) Filip Dewulf (Belgium) Tom Vanhoudt

Final
- Champions: (Argentina) Luis Lobo (Spain) Javier Sánchez
- Runners-up: (Sweden) David Ekerot (Hungary) László Markovits
- Score: 6–4, 6–0

Details
- Draw: 16
- Seeds: 4

Events
Singles	Doubles
← 1994 ·	Croatia Open	· 1996 →

Diego Pérez and Francisco Roig were the defending champions, but none competed this year.

Luis Lobo and Javier Sánchez won the title by defeating David Ekerot and László Markovits 6–4, 6–0 in the final.

== Seeds ==
1. (Argentina) Luis Lobo / (Spain) Javier Sánchez (champions)
2. (Spain) Jordi Arrese / (Spain) Tomás Carbonell (first round)
3. (Netherlands) Tom Kempers / (Netherlands) Menno Oosting (first round)
4. (United States) Mike Bauer / (Spain) José Antonio Conde (semifinals)

== Draw ==
=== Key ===
- Q = Qualifier
- WC = Wild card
- LL = Lucky loser
- Alt = Alternate
- ITF = ITF entry
- PR = Protected ranking
- SR = Special ranking
- SE = Special exempt
- JE = Junior exempt
- JR = Junior Accelerator Programme entrant
- CO = College Accelerator Programme entrant
- NG = Next Gen Accelerator Program entrant
- w/o = Walkover
- r = Retired
- d = Defaulted

=== Draw ===
First round
1	(Argentina) L Lobo (Spain) J Sánchez	6	7
(Argentina) F Davín (Argentina) G Etlis	3	5
(Spain) Á López Morón (Spain) V López Morón	7	4	6
WC	(Croatia) Josip Dumanić (Croatia) G Orešić	5	6	3
4	(United States) M Bauer (Spain) JA Conde	6	3	7
(Italy) M Ardinghi (Italy) F Mordegan	2	6	6
Q	(Croatia) Marcelo Manola (Croatia) K Ritz	2	5
(South Africa) C Ferreira (Hungary) G Köves	6	7
(Spain) A Berasategui (Spain) F Clavet	2	4
LL	(Croatia) I Karlović (Croatia) I Ljubičić	6	6
(Sweden) D Ekerot (Hungary) L Markovits	6	7	6
3	(Netherlands) T Kempers (Netherlands) M Oosting	7	6	4
(United States) J Belloli (Australia) J Ireland	6	6
WC	(Croatia) T Prpić (Croatia) E Rasberger	3	4
(Argentina) P Albano (Czech Republic) V Flégl	6	6
2	(Spain) J Arrese (Spain) T Carbonell	4	0

Quarterfinals
1	(Argentina) L Lobo (Spain) J Sánchez	6	7
(Spain) Á López Morón (Spain) V López Morón	4	5
4	(United States) M Bauer (Spain) JA Conde	6	6
(South Africa) C Ferreira (Hungary) G Köves	2	4
LL	(Croatia) I Karlović (Croatia) I Ljubičić	2	2
(Sweden) D Ekerot (Hungary) L Markovits	6	6
(United States) J Belloli (Australia) J Ireland	4	2
(Argentina) P Albano (Czech Republic) V Flégl	6	6

Semifinals
1	(Argentina) L Lobo (Spain) J Sánchez	7	6	6
4	(United States) M Bauer (Spain) JA Conde	6	7	1
(Sweden) D Ekerot (Hungary) L Markovits	6	6
(Argentina) P Albano (Czech Republic) V Flégl	3	4

Final
1	(Argentina) L Lobo (Spain) J Sánchez	6	6
(Sweden) D Ekerot (Hungary) L Markovits	4	0
