= 1996 Croatia Open – Doubles =

Doubles
- 1996 Croatia Open
- 1995 Champions: (Argentina) Luis Lobo (Spain) Javier Sánchez

Final
- Champions: (Argentina) Pablo Albano (Argentina) Luis Lobo
- Runners-up: (Latvia) Ģirts Dzelde (Austria) Udo Plamberger
- Score: 6–4, 6–1

Details
- Draw: 16
- Seeds: 4

Events
Singles	Doubles
← 1995 ·	Croatia Open	· 1997 →

Luis Lobo and Javier Sánchez were the defending champions but only Lobo competed that year with Pablo Albano.

Albano and Lobo won in the final 6–4, 6–1 against Ģirts Dzelde and Udo Plamberger.

== Seeds ==
Champion seed is indicated in bold text while text in italics indicates the round in which those seeds were eliminated.

1. (Belgium) Libor Pimek / (South Africa) Byron Talbot (first round)
2. (Argentina) **Pablo Albano** / (Argentina) **Luis Lobo (champions)**
3. (South Africa) John-Laffnie de Jager / (Sweden) David Ekerot (quarterfinals)
4. (Czech Republic) Petr Pála / (Czech Republic) David Rikl (semifinals)

== Draw ==
=== Key ===
- Q = Qualifier
- WC = Wild card
- LL = Lucky loser
- Alt = Alternate
- SE = Special exempt
- PR = Protected ranking
- ITF = ITF entry
- JE = Junior exempt
- w/o = Walkover
- r = Retired
- d = Defaulted
- SR = Special ranking

First round
1	(Belgium) L Pimek (South Africa) B Talbot	3	**7**	3
(Latvia) **Ģ Dzelde** (Austria) **U Plamberger**	**6**	5	**6**
(United States) J Belloli (Australia) J Ireland	**6**	6	3
(Italy) **F Mordegan** (Uzbekistan) **O Ogorodov**	3	**7**	**6**
4	(Czech Republic) **P Pála** (Czech Republic) **D Rikl**	3	**6**	**6**
(South Africa) C Ferreira (Romania) A Pavel	**6**	0	3
(Hungary) **G Köves** (Brazil) **F Meligeni**	**6**	**6**
WC	(Croatia) G Prpić (Croatia) I Saric	2	2
(Argentina) M Hood (Argentina) S Prieto	5	2
(Czech Republic) **C Doseděl** (Czech Republic) **P Vízner**	**7**	**6**
Q	(Croatia) I Karlović (Croatia) K Ritz	6	3
3	(South Africa) **J-L de Jager** (Sweden) **D Ekerot**	**7**	**6**
WC	(Croatia) **T Prpic** (Croatia) **E Rasberger**	**6**	**6**
(Spain) A Berasategui (Hungary) L Markovits	3	4
WC	(Spain) A Costa (Spain) C Moyá	6	**7**	4
2	(Argentina) **P Albano** (Argentina) **L Lobo**	**7**	6	**6**

Quarterfinals
(Latvia) **Ģ Dzelde** (Austria) **U Plamberger**	**6**	**6**
(Italy) F Mordegan (Uzbekistan) O Ogorodov	3	3
4	(Czech Republic) **P Pála** (Czech Republic) **D Rikl**	**7**	4	**7**
(Hungary) G Köves (Brazil) F Meligeni	5	**6**	5
(Czech Republic) **C Doseděl** (Czech Republic) **P Vízner**	4	**6**	**6**
3	(South Africa) J-L de Jager (Sweden) D Ekerot	**6**	4	2
WC	(Croatia) T Prpic (Croatia) E Rasberger	2	4
2	(Argentina) **P Albano** (Argentina) **L Lobo**	**6**	**6**

Semifinals
(Latvia) **Ģ Dzelde** (Austria) **U Plamberger**	1	**6**	**6**
4	(Czech Republic) P Pála (Czech Republic) D Rikl	**6**	3	4
(Czech Republic) C Doseděl (Czech Republic) P Vízner	4	3
2	(Argentina) **P Albano** (Argentina) **L Lobo**	**6**	**6**

Final
(Latvia) Ģirts Dzelde (Austria) Udo Plamberger	4	1
2	(Argentina) **Pablo Albano** (Argentina) **Luis Lobo**	**6**	**6**
