= 1994 Croatia Open Umag – Doubles =

Doubles
- 1994 Croatia Open Umag
- 1993 Champions: (Uruguay) Diego Pérez (Spain) Francisco Roig

Final
- Champions: (Belgium) Filip Dewulf (Belgium) Tom Vanhoudt
- Runners-up: (Slovakia) Karol Kučera (Kenya) Paul Wekesa
- Score: 6–2, 6–4

Details
- Draw: 16
- Seeds: 4

Events
Singles	Doubles
← 1993 ·	Croatia Open	· 1995 →

Filip Dewulf and Tom Vanhoudt were the defending champions, but Dewulf did not compete this year. Vanhoudt teamed up with Aleksandar Kitinov and lost in the first round to Emilio Benfele Álvarez and Hernán Gumy.

Diego Pérez and Francisco Roig won the title by defeating qualifiers Karol Kučera and Paul Wekesa 6–2, 6–4 in the final.

== Seeds ==
1. (Spain) Sergio Casal / (Spain) Emilio Sánchez (semifinals)
2. (Belgium) Libor Pimek / (United States) Jack Waite (first round)
3. (Italy) Cristian Brandi / (Italy) Federico Mordegan (quarterfinals)
4. (Uruguay) Diego Pérez / (Spain) Francisco Roig (champions)

== Draw ==
=== Key ===
- Q = Qualifier
- WC = Wild card
- LL = Lucky loser
- Alt = Alternate
- ITF = ITF entry
- PR = Protected ranking
- SR = Special ranking
- SE = Special exempt
- JE = Junior exempt
- JR = Junior Accelerator Programme entrant
- CO = College Accelerator Programme entrant
- NG = Next Gen Accelerator Program entrant
- w/o = Walkover
- r = Retired
- d = Defaulted

=== Draw ===
First round
1	(Spain) S Casal (Spain) E Sánchez	6	6
WC	(Croatia) S Hiršzon (Croatia) I Šarić	1	4
(Spain) J Arrese (Hungary) L Markovits	6	6
(Australia) W Arthurs (Australia) S Youl	4	4
4	(Uruguay) D Pérez (Spain) F Roig	6	3	6
(Czech Republic) V Flégl (South Africa) K Haygarth	3	6	4
(North Macedonia) A Kitinov (Belgium) T Vanhoudt	2	3
LL	(Spain) E Benfele Álvarez (Argentina) H Gumy	6	6
LL	(Spain) G López-Fabero (Spain) JA Viloca	5	2
Q	(Slovakia) K Kučera (Kenya) P Wekesa	7	6
WC	(Croatia) T Prpić (Croatia) E Rasberger	1	6
3	(Italy) C Brandi (Italy) F Mordegan	6	7
(Latvia) Ģ Dzelde (Australia) J Ireland	7	6
(Spain) T Carbonell (South Africa) C Ferreira	6	3
(Argentina) L Lobo (Argentina) D Orsanic	6	7
2	(Belgium) L Pimek (United States) J Waite	4	5

Quarterfinals
1	(Spain) S Casal (Spain) E Sánchez	4	7	6
(Spain) J Arrese (Hungary) L Markovits	6	6	4
4	(Uruguay) D Pérez (Spain) F Roig	6	6
LL	(Spain) E Benfele Álvarez (Argentina) H Gumy	1	4
Q	(Slovakia) K Kučera (Kenya) P Wekesa	3	7	6
3	(Italy) C Brandi (Italy) F Mordegan	6	5	4
(Latvia) Ģ Dzelde (Australia) J Ireland	7	5	0
(Argentina) L Lobo (Argentina) D Orsanic	6	7	6

Semifinals
1	(Spain) S Casal (Spain) E Sánchez	3	4
4	(Uruguay) D Pérez (Spain) F Roig	6	6
Q	(Slovakia) K Kučera (Kenya) P Wekesa	6	6
(Argentina) L Lobo (Argentina) D Orsanic	0	1

Final
4	(Uruguay) D Pérez (Spain) F Roig	6	6
Q	(Slovakia) K Kučera (Kenya) P Wekesa	2	4
