= 1995 ATP Challenger Series =

Tennis tour

Details
- Duration: 2 January 1995 – 17 December 1995
- Edition: 18th
- Tournaments: 86

Achievements (singles)

The ATP Challenger Series is the second tier tour for professional tennis organised by the Association of Tennis Professionals (ATP). The 1995 ATP Challenger Series calendar comprised 86 tournaments, with prize money ranging from $25,000 up to $125,000.

== Schedule ==
=== January ===
Date	Country	Tournament	Prizemoney	Surface	Singles champion	Doubles champions
02.01.	New Zealand	BP National Championships	$ 50,000	Hard	(New Zealand) Brett Steven	(The Bahamas) Mark Knowles (Canada) Daniel Nestor
23.01.	Germany	Heilbronn Open	$ 100,000	Carpet (i)	(Czech Republic) David Rikl	(Croatia) Saša Hiršzon (Croatia) Goran Ivanišević
30.01.	Germany	Lippstadt Challenger	$ 25,000	Carpet (i)	(Germany) Lars Burgsmüller	(United States) Bill Behrens (Germany) Mathias Huning

=== February ===
Date	Country	Tournament	Prizemoney	Surface	Singles champion	Doubles champions
06.02.	Germany	Volkswagen Challenger	$ 25,000	Carpet (i)	(Germany) David Prinosil	(Germany) Martin Sinner (Netherlands) Joost Winnink
13.02.	Germany	Hambühren Challenger	$ 25,000	Carpet (i)	(Slovakia) Ján Krošlák	(United States) Bret Garnett (United States) T. J. Middleton
13.02.	Argentina	Mar del Plata Challenger	$ 25,000	Clay	(Czech Republic) Jiří Novák	(Argentina) Javier Frana (Argentina) Luis Lobo
20.02.	France	Cherbourg Challenger	$ 50,000	Hard (i)	(Italy) Gianluca Pozzi	(United States) Bill Behrens (United States) Matt Lucena
20.02.	Argentina	Mendoza Challenger	$ 25,000	Clay	(Belgium) Johan Van Herck	(United States) Donald Johnson (United States) Jack Waite
27.02.	Germany	Warsteiner Challenger	$ 50,000	Carpet (i)	(Germany) David Prinosil	(Germany) David Prinosil (Germany) Martin Sinner
27.02.	United States	Indian Wells Challenger	$ 50,000	Hard	(United States) Tommy Ho	(Sweden) Nicklas Kulti (Sweden) Mikael Tillström
27.02.	Uruguay	Punta del Este Challenger	$ 25,000	Clay	(Portugal) Emanuel Couto	(Argentina) Christian Miniussi (Uruguay) Diego Pérez

=== March ===
Date	Country	Tournament	Prizemoney	Surface	Singles champion	Doubles champions
06.03.	Germany	Garmisch-Partenkirchen Challenger	$ 25,000	Hard (i)	(Germany) Nicolas Kiefer	(France) Lionel Barthez (Portugal) Nuno Marques
13.03.	Morocco	Agadir Challenger	$ 75,000	Clay	(Spain) Óscar Martínez	(Spain) Jordi Burillo (Spain) Francisco Roig

=== April ===
Date	Country	Tournament	Prizemoney	Surface	Singles champion	Doubles champions
17.04.	Monaco	Monte Carlo Challenger	$ 50,000	Clay	(Netherlands) Sjeng Schalken	(Sweden) Nicklas Kulti (Sweden) Mikael Tillström
17.04.	Japan	Nagoya Challenger	$ 50,000	Hard	(Australia) Scott Draper	(India) Leander Paes (Zimbabwe) Kevin Ullyett
24.04.	United States	Birmingham Challenger	$ 75,000	Clay	(Czech Republic) Bohdan Ulihrach	(United States) Ken Flach (United States) Bryan Shelton

=== May ===
Date	Country	Tournament	Prizemoney	Surface	Singles champion	Doubles champions
01.05.	India	Bombay Challenger	$ 50,000	Hard	(Zimbabwe) Byron Black	(Zimbabwe) Byron Black (Zimbabwe) Wayne Black
01.05.	Malta	Malta Challenger	$ 25,000	Hard	(Romania) Adrian Voinea	(South Africa) Marius Barnard (France) Lionel Barthez
08.05.	Slovenia	Ljubljana Challenger	$ 125,000	Clay	(Spain) Jordi Burillo	(Sweden) Nicklas Kulti (Sweden) Mikael Tillström
08.05.	Israel	Jerusalem Challenger	$ 50,000	Hard	(Sweden) Thomas Johansson	(Germany) Dirk Dier (Germany) Christian Saceanu
15.05.	Germany	Ostdeutscher Sparkassen Cup	$ 50,000	Clay	(Belgium) Kris Goossens	(United States) Matt Lucena (Portugal) Nuno Marques
22.05.	Hungary	Budapest Challenger I	$ 75,000	Clay	(Czech Republic) Jiří Novák	(Argentina) Pablo Albano (Netherlands) Hendrik Jan Davids
29.05.	Paraguay	Asunción Challenger	$ 25,000	Clay	(Brazil) Jaime Oncins	(United States) Francisco Montana (Ivory Coast) Claude N'Goran

=== June ===
Date	Country	Tournament	Prizemoney	Surface	Singles champion	Doubles champions
05.06.	Germany	Quelle Cup	$ 100,000	Clay	(Norway) Christian Ruud	(Australia) Andrew Kratzmann (Australia) Brent Larkham
05.06.	Austria	Annenheim Challenger	$ 50,000	Grass	(Sweden) Henrik Holm	(Italy) Diego Nargiso (Venezuela) Nicolás Pereira
05.06.	Colombia	Medellín Challenger	$ 25,000	Clay	(France) Jérôme Golmard	(Zimbabwe) Wayne Black (Hungary) László Markovits
12.06.	Colombia	Cali Challenger	$ 50,000	Clay	(Argentina) Gastón Etlis	(United States) Francisco Montana (Republic of Ireland) Claude N'Goran
12.06.	Germany	ATU Cup	$ 25,000	Clay	(Romania) Dinu Pescariu	(Germany) Dirk Dier (Germany) Lars Koslowski
19.06.	Slovakia	Košice Challenger	$ 125,000	Clay	(Romania) Adrian Voinea	(Czech Republic) Jiří Novák (Czech Republic) David Rikl
19.06.	Colombia	Bogotá Challenger	$ 50,000	Clay	(France) Jérôme Golmard	(Mexico) Óscar Ortiz (India) Leander Paes
19.06.	Germany	Wartburg Open	$ 25,000	Clay	(Poland) Wojciech Kowalski	(Germany) Dirk Dier (Germany) Lars Koslowski
26.06.	Germany	Nord/LB Open	$ 125,000	Clay	(Sweden) Magnus Gustafsson	(Sweden) Nicklas Kulti (Sweden) Mikael Tillström
26.06.	Ecuador	Quito Challenger	$ 50,000	Clay	(Ecuador) Luis Morejón	(United States) Ivan Baron (United States) Ian Williams

=== July ===
Date	Country	Tournament	Prizemoney	Surface	Singles champion	Doubles champions
03.07.	France	Montauban Challenger	$ 25,000	Clay	(Belgium) Johan Van Herck	(United States) Robert Devens (Egypt) Tamer El-Sawy
03.07.	Spain	Copa Sevilla	$ 25,000	Clay	(Germany) Dirk Dier	(Netherlands) Martijn Bok (Netherlands) Tom Vanhoudt
10.07.	United States	Aptos Challenger	$ 50,000	Hard	(Canada) Daniel Nestor	(Canada) Sébastien Leblanc (United States) Brian MacPhie
10.07.	Great Britain	Bristol Challenger	$ 50,000	Grass	(United Kingdom) Jeremy Bates	(Belarus) Max Mirnyi (Belarus) Vladimir Voltchkov
10.07.	Germany	Müller Cup	$ 50,000	Clay	(Germany) Carl-Uwe Steeb	(Argentina) Pablo Albano (Netherlands) Tom Kempers
10.07.	Belgium	Ostend Challenger	$ 25,000	Clay	(Belgium) Johan Van Herck	(South Africa) Clinton Ferreira (North Macedonia) Aleksandar Kitinov
17.07.	Netherlands	Scheveningen Challenger	$ 25,000	Clay	(Spain) Jordi Arrese	(Romania) Andrei Pavel (Israel) Eyal Ran
17.07.	Canada	Granby Challenger	$ 50,000	Hard	(United States) Robbie Weiss	(United States) Brian MacPhie (Australia) Sandon Stolle
17.07.	Great Britain	Manchester Challenger	$ 50,000	Grass	(United Kingdom) Chris Wilkinson	(United Kingdom) Tim Henman (United Kingdom) Mark Petchey
17.07.	Brazil	Belo Horizonte Challenger	$ 25,000	Hard	(United States) Steve Campbell	(United States) David DiLucia (United States) Dan Kronauge
17.07.	Norway	Lillehammer Challenger	$ 25,000	Clay	(Australia) Andrew Ilie	(Sweden) Thomas Johansson (Sweden) Lars-Anders Wahlgren
17.07.	Germany	Oberstaufen Cup	$ 25,000	Clay	(Spain) Carlos Moyá	(Czech Republic) Tomáš Krupa (Czech Republic) Jiří Novák
24.07.	Poland	Poznań Challenger	$ 100,000	Clay	(Spain) Jordi Arrese	(United States) Bill Behrens (United States) Matt Lucena
24.07.	Great Britain	Newcastle Challenger	$ 50,000	Hard	(Belgium) Dick Norman	(United Kingdom) Andrew Foster (United Kingdom) Danny Sapsford
24.07.	Brazil	São Paulo Challenger	$ 50,000	Hard	(France) Jean-Philippe Fleurian	(Argentina) Lucas Arnold Ker (Argentina) Patricio Arnold
24.07.	Finland	Tampere Challenger	$ 50,000	Clay	(Spain) Galo Blanco	(Sweden) Thomas Johansson (Sweden) Mårten Renström
24.07.	Czech Republic	Prague Challenger	$ 25,000	Clay	(Spain) Albert Portas	(Belgium) Filip Dewulf (Czech Republic) Vojtěch Flégl
31.07.	Turkey	Istanbul Challenger	$ 100,000	Hard	(United Kingdom) Miles Maclagan	(Switzerland) Lorenzo Manta (Italy) Omar Camporese
31.07.	Brazil	Brasília Challenger	$ 50,000	Hard	(India) Leander Paes	(France) Jean-Philippe Fleurian (Venezuela) Nicolás Pereira
31.07.	United States	Lexington Challenger	$ 50,000	Hard	(The Bahamas) Mark Knowles	(Netherlands) Fernon Wibier (United States) Chris Woodruff

=== August ===
Date	Country	Tournament	Prizemoney	Surface	Singles champion	Doubles champions
07.08.	Spain	Open Castilla y León	$ 100,000	Hard	(France) Rodolphe Gilbert	(France) Rodolphe Gilbert (France) Guillaume Raoux
07.08.	United States	Binghamton Challenger	$ 50,000	Hard	(Japan) Shuzo Matsuoka	(United States) Scott Humphries (United States) Adam Peterson
07.08.	Brazil	Rio de Janeiro Challenger	$ 50,000	Hard	(Venezuela) Nicolás Pereira	(Portugal) João Cunha e Silva (Mexico) Óscar Ortiz
14.08.	Austria	Graz Challenger	$ 125,000	Clay	(Spain) Carlos Costa	(Argentina) Pablo Albano (Czech Republic) Vojtěch Flégl
14.08.	United States	Bronx Challenger	$ 50,000	Hard	(Egypt) Tamer El-Sawy	(Australia) Jamie Holmes (United Kingdom) Ross Matheson
14.08.	Switzerland	Geneva Challenger	$ 50,000	Clay	(Morocco) Younes El Aynaoui	(South Africa) Clinton Ferreira (Hungary) Gábor Köves
21.08.	Czech Republic	Pilzen Challenger	$ 25,000	Clay	(Czech Republic) David Rikl	(Portugal) Emanuel Couto (Portugal) João Cunha e Silva
28.08.	Uzbekistan	Tashkent Challenger	$ 125,000	Clay	(Morocco) Karim Alami	(United States) Brian Dunn (Hungary) Attila Sávolt

=== September ===
Date	Country	Tournament	Prizemoney	Surface	Singles champion	Doubles champions
04.09.	Aruba	Aruba Challenger	$ 125,000	Hard	(United States) Chris Woodruff	(India) Mahesh Bhupathi (India) Leander Paes
04.09.	Portugal	Azores Challenger	$ 50,000	Hard	(Portugal) Nuno Marques	(United Kingdom) Tim Henman (Germany) Christian Saceanu
04.09.	Italy	Merano Challenger	$ 50,000	Clay	(Sweden) Mikael Tillström	(Italy) Cristian Brandi (Italy) Igor Gaudi
04.09.	Czech Republic	Prostějov Challenger	$ 50,000	Clay	(Italy) Andrea Gaudenzi	(Romania) Andrei Pavel (New Zealand) Glenn Wilson
11.09.	Hungary	Budapest Challenger II	$ 50,000	Clay	(Spain) Carlos Moyá	(Portugal) Emanuel Couto (Portugal) João Cunha e Silva
18.09.	Spain	Barcelona Challenger	$ 125,000	Clay	(Spain) Jordi Burillo	(Argentina) Luis Lobo (Spain) Javier Sánchez
18.09.	Italy	Napoli Challenger	$ 50,000	Clay	(Sweden) Thomas Johansson	(Italy) Stefano Pescosolido (Italy) Vincenzo Santopadre
18.09.	Singapore	Singapore Challenger	$ 50,000	Hard	(Russia) Andrei Cherkasov	(United Kingdom) Chris Wilkinson (Germany) Martin Zumpft
25.09.	Belgium	Charleroi Challenger	$ 25,000	Hard	(Spain) Tati Rascón	(Netherlands) Tom Kempers (Netherlands) Stephen Noteboom

=== October ===
Date	Country	Tournament	Prizemoney	Surface	Singles champion	Doubles champions
02.10.	Mexico	Monterrey Challenger	$ 100,000	Hard	(Portugal) João Cunha e Silva	(The Bahamas) Mark Knowles (Canada) Daniel Nestor
02.10.	Italy	Siracusa Challenger	$ 25,000	Clay	(Morocco) Younes El Aynaoui	(Sweden) Magnus Norman (Sweden) Tomas Nydahl
09.10.	Ecuador	Challenger Ciudad de Guayaquil	$ 50,000	Clay	(Belgium) Kris Goossens	(Czech Republic) Tomáš Krupa (Czech Republic) Pavel Vízner
16.10.	Peru	Lima Challenger	$ 100,000	Clay	(Czech Republic) Jiří Novák	(Peru) Américo Venero (Peru) Jaime Yzaga
16.10.	United States	Glendale Challenger	$ 50,000	Hard	(The Bahamas) Mark Knowles	(Sweden) Rikard Bergh (Sweden) David Ekerot
23.10.	France	Brest Challenger	$ 100,000	Hard (i)	(Russia) Andrei Cherkasov	(France) Olivier Delaître (France) Guillaume Raoux
23.10.	South Korea	Seoul Challenger	$ 50,000	Clay	(United Kingdom) Tim Henman	(United Kingdom) Tim Henman (United Kingdom) Andrew Richardson
30.10.	Germany	Lambertz Open by STAWAG	$ 50,000	Carpet (i)	(Germany) Jörn Renzenbrink	(Sweden) David Ekerot (Hungary) László Markovits
30.10.	India	Ahmedabad Challenger	$ 25,000	Clay	(Sweden) Tomas Nydahl	(Italy) Pietro Pennisi (Italy) Davide Sanguinetti

=== November ===
Date	Country	Tournament	Prizemoney	Surface	Singles champion	Doubles champions
06.11.	China	Beijing Challenger	$ 25,000	Hard	(Romania) Dinu Pescariu	(United States) Ivan Baron (Portugal) João Cunha e Silva
13.11.	France	Nantes Challenger	$ 100,000	Hard (i)	(France) Guillaume Raoux	(United States) Kent Kinnear (Canada) Sébastien Lareau
13.11.	Réunion	Réunion Challenger	$ 50,000	Hard	(United Kingdom) Tim Henman	(Senegal) Yahiya Doumbia (France) Fabrice Santoro
20.11.	Andorra	Andorra Challenger	$ 100,000	Hard	(Germany) Alex Rădulescu	(United States) Ken Flach (United States) Kelly Jones
20.11.	Chile	Santiago Challenger	$ 25,000	Clay	(Ecuador) Nicolás Lapentti	(United States) Brandon Coupe (Canada) Sébastien Leblanc
27.11.	Slovenia	Rogaška Challenger	$ 25,000	Carpet (i)	(Germany) Alex Rădulescu	(United Kingdom) Mark Petchey (United Kingdom) Andrew Richardson

=== December ===
Date	Country	Tournament	Prizemoney	Surface	Singles champion	Doubles champions
11.12.	Australia	Perth Challenger	$ 25,000	Hard	(Australia) Andrew Ilie	(Australia) Joshua Eagle (Australia) Andrew Florent
