= 1994 Croatia Open Umag – Singles =

Singles
- 1994 Croatia Open Umag
- 1993 Champion: (Austria) Thomas Muster

Final
- Champion: (Spain) Alberto Berasategui
- Runner-up: (Slovakia) Karol Kučera
- Score: 6–2, 6–4

Details
- Draw: 32 (3WC/4Q)
- Seeds: 8

Events
Singles	Doubles
← 1993 ·	Croatia Open	· 1995 →

Thomas Muster was the defending champion, but did not compete this year.

Alberto Berasategui won the title by defeating Karol Kučera 6–2, 6–4 in the final.

== Seeds ==
1. (Spain) Alberto Berasategui (champion)
2. (Austria) Gilbert Schaller (second round, retired)
3. (Spain) Tomás Carbonell (second round)
4. (Austria) Horst Skoff (semifinals)
5. (Spain) Albert Costa (first round, retired)
6. (Spain) Jordi Arrese (semifinals)
7. (Argentina) Gabriel Markus (quarterfinals)
8. (Slovakia) Karol Kučera (final)

== Draw ==
=== Key ===
- Q = Qualifier
- WC = Wild card
- LL = Lucky loser
- Alt = Alternate
- ITF = ITF entry
- PR = Protected ranking
- SR = Special ranking
- SE = Special exempt
- JE = Junior exempt
- JR = Junior Accelerator Programme entrant
- CO = College Accelerator Programme entrant
- NG = Next Gen Accelerator Program entrant
- w/o = Walkover
- r = Retired
- d = Defaulted

=== Finals ===
Semifinals
1	(Spain) Alberto Berasategui	6	6
6	(Spain) Jordi Arrese	3	3
4	(Austria) Horst Skoff	6	4	3
8	(Slovakia) Karol Kučera	0	6	6

Final
1	(Spain) Alberto Berasategui	6	6
8	(Slovakia) Karol Kučera	2	4

=== Top half ===
First round
1	(Spain) A Berasategui	6	7
Q	(Austria) H Wiltschnig	2	5
WC	(Italy) O Camporese	6	3	2
(Italy) P Canè	2	6	6
(Sweden) T Nydahl	6	6
(Belgium) X Daufresne	3	0
Q	(Czech Republic) P Vízner	1	4
7	(Argentina) G Markus	6	6
3	(Spain) T Carbonell	7^{7}	6
Q	(France) S Huet	6^{4}	1
(Argentina) D Orsanic	4	2
(Argentina) H Gumy	6	6
(Spain) F Roig	6	6
(Belgium) F Dewulf	1	2
(France) G Solvès	6	6^{3}	1
6	(Spain) J Arrese	3	7^{7}	6

Second round
1	(Spain) A Berasategui	6	6
(Italy) P Canè	2	2
(Sweden) T Nydahl	1	7^{7}	6^{10}
7	(Argentina) G Markus	6	6^{4}	7^{12}
3	(Spain) T Carbonell	4	6	1
(Argentina) H Gumy	6	2	6
(Spain) F Roig	7	4	1
6	(Spain) J Arrese	5	6	6

Quarterfinals
1	(Spain) A Berasategui	6	6
7	(Argentina) G Markus	3	4
(Argentina) H Gumy	6	4	4
6	(Spain) J Arrese	2	6	6

Semifinals
1	(Spain) A Berasategui	6	6
6	(Spain) J Arrese	3	3

=== Bottom half ===
First round
5	(Spain) A Costa	4	0^{r}
(Spain) F Sánchez	6	1
WC	(Croatia) E Rasberger	1	2
Q	(Spain) E Benfele Álvarez	6	6
(Brazil) R Jabali	6	4	6
(Australia) S Youl	1	6	3
(Italy) D Nargiso	5	4
4	(Austria) H Skoff	7	6
8	(Slovakia) K Kučera	4
(Spain) F Clavet	1^{r}
(Germany) CU Steeb	6^{7}	6	6
(Argentina) F Davín	7^{9}	4	2
WC	(Croatia) S Hiršzon	4^{r}
(Spain) E Sánchez	5
(Chile) S Cortés	1	6	2
2	(Austria) G Schaller	6	4	6

Second round
(Spain) F Sánchez	3	2
Q	(Spain) E Benfele Álvarez	6	6
(Brazil) R Jabali	6	4	4
4	(Austria) H Skoff	4	6	6
8	(Slovakia) K Kučera	6	7
(Germany) CU Steeb	3	5
(Spain) E Sánchez	6	1
2	(Austria) G Schaller	2	0^{r}

Quarterfinals
Q	(Spain) E Benfele Álvarez	3	6	1
4	(Austria) H Skoff	6	4	6
8	(Slovakia) K Kučera	6	4	7^{7}
(Spain) E Sánchez	4	6	6^{2}

Semifinals
4	(Austria) H Skoff	6	4	3
8	(Slovakia) K Kučera	0	6	6
