= 1993 Croatia Open – Singles =

Singles
- 1993 Croatia Open
- 1992 Champion: (Austria) Thomas Muster

Final
- Champion: (Austria) Thomas Muster
- Runner-up: (Spain) Alberto Berasategui
- Score: 7–5, 3–6, 6–3

Details
- Draw: 32 (3WC/4Q)
- Seeds: 8

Events
Singles	Doubles
← 1992 ·	Croatia Open	· 1994 →

Thomas Muster successfully defended his title by defeating Alberto Berasategui 7–5, 3–6, 6–3 in the final.

== Seeds ==
1. (Austria) Thomas Muster (champion)
2. (Sweden) Magnus Gustafsson (semifinals)
3. (Austria) Horst Skoff (quarterfinals, withdrew)
4. (Argentina) Guillermo Pérez Roldán (quarterfinals)
5. (Italy) Renzo Furlan (semifinals)
6. (Spain) Alberto Berasategui (final)
7. (Spain) Jordi Arrese (first round)
8. (Czech Republic) Sláva Doseděl (second round)

== Draw ==
=== Key ===
- Q = Qualifier
- WC = Wild card
- LL = Lucky loser
- Alt = Alternate
- ITF = ITF entry
- PR = Protected ranking
- SR = Special ranking
- SE = Special exempt
- JE = Junior exempt
- JR = Junior Accelerator Programme entrant
- CO = College Accelerator Programme entrant
- NG = Next Gen Accelerator Program entrant
- w/o = Walkover
- r = Retired
- d = Defaulted

=== Finals ===
Semifinals
1	(Austria) Thomas Muster	7^{7}	6
5	(Italy) Renzo Furlan	6^{3}	3
6	(Spain) Alberto Berasategui	1	6	6
2	(Sweden) Magnus Gustafsson	6	2	3

Final
1	(Austria) Thomas Muster	7	3	6
6	(Spain) Alberto Berasategui	5	6	3

=== Top half ===
First round
1	(Austria) T Muster	6	6
WC	(Croatia) E Rasberger	1	2
WC	(Italy) A Gaudenzi	5	7^{7}	5
(Spain) JF Altur	7	6^{5}	7
WC	(Croatia) D Buljević	4	2
(Argentina) A Mancini	6	6
Q	(Spain) J Gisbert Schultze	7^{7}	6
7	(Spain) J Arrese	6^{4}	4
4	(Argentina) G Pérez Roldán	7^{7}	6
(Belgium) B Wuyts	6^{3}	2
(Sweden) L Jönsson	3	7	4
(Mexico) O Fernández	6	5	6
(Argentina) F Davín	6	6
Q	(Sweden) M Tillström	2	1
(Czech Republic) M Střelba	7	3	0
5	(Italy) R Furlan	5	6	6

Second round
1	(Austria) T Muster	6	6
(Spain) JF Altur	4	2
(Argentina) A Mancini	6^{5}	6	5
Q	(Spain) J Gisbert Schultze	7^{7}	3	7
4	(Argentina) G Pérez Roldán	6	6
(Mexico) O Fernández	4	0
(Argentina) F Davín	4	5
5	(Italy) R Furlan	6	7

Quarterfinals
1	(Austria) T Muster	6	6
Q	(Spain) J Gisbert Schultze	4	3
4	(Argentina) G Pérez Roldán	6	0	6^{3}
5	(Italy) R Furlan	4	6	7^{7}

Semifinals
1	(Austria) T Muster	7^{7}	6
5	(Italy) R Furlan	6^{3}	3

=== Bottom half ===
First round
6	(Spain) A Berasategui	6	6
Q	(Spain) F Sánchez	2	3
(Portugal) J Cunha e Silva	6^{3}	3
(Spain) F Roig	7^{7}	6
(Argentina) D Orsanic	6	6
(Belgium) F Dewulf	3	4
(Germany) M Naewie	5	3
3	(Austria) H Skoff	7	6
8	(Czech Republic) S Doseděl	4	6	7
(Chile) S Cortés	6	1	5
(Argentina) G Markus	6	3	6
(Argentina) M Stringari	3	6	3
(Switzerland) C Mezzadri	2	7^{7}	6
Q	(Spain) A Mancisidor	6	6^{4}	0
(Spain) M Górriz	2	5
2	(Sweden) M Gustafsson	6	7

Second round
6	(Spain) A Berasategui	7	6
(Spain) F Roig	5	1
(Argentina) D Orsanic	2	6^{4}
3	(Austria) H Skoff	6	7^{7}
8	(Czech Republic) S Doseděl	5	1
(Argentina) G Markus	7	6
(Switzerland) C Mezzadri	3	7^{7}	4
2	(Sweden) M Gustafsson	6	6^{3}	6

Quarterfinals
6	(Spain) A Berasategui	w/o
3	(Austria) H Skoff
(Argentina) G Markus	2	4
2	(Sweden) M Gustafsson	6	6

Semifinals
6	(Spain) A Berasategui	1	6	6
2	(Sweden) M Gustafsson	6	2	3
