= 1993 Croatia Open – Doubles =

Doubles
- 1993 Croatia Open
- 1992 Champions: (Germany) David Prinosil (Czechoslovakia) Richard Vogel

Final
- Champions: (Belgium) Filip Dewulf (Belgium) Tom Vanhoudt
- Runners-up: (Spain) Jordi Arrese (Spain) Francisco Roig
- Score: 6–4, 7–5

Details
- Draw: 16 (2WC/1Q)
- Seeds: 4

Events
Singles	Doubles
← 1992 ·	Croatia Open	· 1994 →

David Prinosil and Richard Vogel were the defending champions, but Prinosil chose to compete at Long Island during the same week, winning that title. Vogel teamed up with Ģirts Dzelde and lost in the semifinals to Jordi Arrese and Francisco Roig.

Filip Dewulf and Tom Vanhoudt won the title by defeating Arrese and Roig 6–4, 7–5 in the final.

== Seeds ==
1. (Czech Republic) Vojtěch Flégl / (Denmark) Michael Mortensen (first round)
2. (United States) Doug Eisenman / (United States) Donald Johnson (semifinals)
3. (Italy) Cristian Brandi / (Italy) Federico Mordegan (first round)
4. (Argentina) Juan Garat / (Argentina) Roberto Saad (quarterfinals)

== Draw ==
=== Key ===
- Q = Qualifier
- WC = Wild card
- LL = Lucky loser
- Alt = Alternate
- ITF = ITF entry
- PR = Protected ranking
- SR = Special ranking
- SE = Special exempt
- JE = Junior exempt
- JR = Junior Accelerator Programme entrant
- CO = College Accelerator Programme entrant
- NG = Next Gen Accelerator Program entrant
- w/o = Walkover
- r = Retired
- d = Defaulted

=== Draw ===
First round
1	(Czech Republic) V Flégl (Denmark) M Mortensen	4	6	5
Q	(Spain) E Benfele Álvarez (Spain) J Gisbert Schultze	6	3	7
(United States) J Waite (United States) J Yancey	2	3
WC	(Spain) J Arrese (Spain) F Roig	6	6
4	(Argentina) J Garat (Argentina) R Saad	4	7	7
WC	(Croatia) T Prpić (Croatia) I Šarić	6	6	6
(Australia) J Ireland (France) B Lemercier	6	6	6
(Latvia) Ģ Dzelde (Czech Republic) R Vogel	4	7	7
(Spain) M Górriz (United States) M Keil	6	6
(Argentina) D Orsanic (Finland) O Rahnasto	2	3
(Belgium) F Dewulf (Belgium) T Vanhoudt	4	6	6
3	(Italy) C Brandi (Italy) F Mordegan	6	3	3
(Brazil) N Aerts (Portugal) J Cunha e Silva	6	4	4
(Australia) C Limberger (Australia) S Youl	4	6	6
(Italy) M Ardinghi (Russia) A Merinov	3	1
2	(United States) D Eisenman (United States) D Johnson	6	6

Quarterfinals
Q	(Spain) E Benfele Álvarez (Spain) J Gisbert Schultze	6	5
WC	(Spain) J Arrese (Spain) F Roig	7	7
4	(Argentina) J Garat (Argentina) R Saad	6	6
(Latvia) Ģ Dzelde (Czech Republic) R Vogel	7	7
(Spain) M Górriz (United States) M Keil	6	6	3
(Belgium) F Dewulf (Belgium) T Vanhoudt	7	4	6
(Australia) C Limberger (Australia) S Youl	2	6	4
2	(United States) D Eisenman (United States) D Johnson	6	3	6

Semifinals
WC	(Spain) J Arrese (Spain) F Roig	6	2	6
(Latvia) Ģ Dzelde (Czech Republic) R Vogel	2	6	1
(Belgium) F Dewulf (Belgium) T Vanhoudt	6	6
2	(United States) D Eisenman (United States) D Johnson	2	3

Final
WC	(Spain) J Arrese (Spain) F Roig	4	5
(Belgium) F Dewulf (Belgium) T Vanhoudt	6	7
