= 1993 Croatia Open =

- Date: 23–29 August
- Edition: 4th
- Category: World Series
- Draw: 32S / 16D
- Prize money: $275,000
- Surface: Clay / outdoor
- Location: Umag, Croatia

Champions

Singles
- (Austria) Thomas Muster

Doubles
- (Belgium) Filip Dewulf / (Belgium) Tom Vanhoudt
| ← 1992 · | Croatia Open | · 1994 → |

The 1993 Croatia Open was a men's tennis tournament played on outdoor clay courts in Umag, Croatia that was part of the World Series of the 1993 ATP Tour. It was the fourth edition of the tournament and was held from 23 August until 29 August 1993. First-seeded Thomas Muster won his second consecutive singles title at the event.

== Finals ==
=== Singles ===
(Austria) Thomas Muster defeated (Spain) Alberto Berasategui, 7–5, 3–6, 6–3

- It was Muster's 6th singles title of the year and the 19th of his career.

=== Doubles ===
(Belgium) Filip Dewulf / (Belgium) Tom Vanhoudt defeated (Spain) Jordi Arrese / (Spain) Francisco Roig, 6–4, 7–5
