= 1994 Croatia Open Umag =

- Date: 22–29 August
- Edition: 5th
- Category: World Series
- Draw: 32S / 16D
- Prize money: $375,000
- Surface: Clay / outdoor
- Location: Umag, Croatia

Champions

Singles
- (Spain) Alberto Berasategui

Doubles
- (Uruguay) Diego Pérez / (Spain) Francisco Roig
← 1993 ·	Croatia Open	· 1995 →

The 1994 Croatia Open Umag was a men's tennis tournament played on outdoor clay courts in Umag, Croatia that was part of the World Series of the 1994 ATP Tour. It was the fifth edition of the tournament and was held from 22 August through 29 August 1994. First-seeded Alberto Berasategui won the singles title.

== Finals ==
=== Singles ===
(Spain) Alberto Berasategui defeated (Slovakia) Karol Kučera, 6–2, 6–4

- It was Berasategui's 3rd title of the year and the 4th of his career.

=== Doubles ===
(Uruguay) Diego Pérez / (Spain) Francisco Roig defeated (Slovakia) Karol Kučera / (Kenya) Paul Wekesa, 6–2, 6–4

- It was Perez only title of the year and the 4th of his career. It was Roig's only title of the year and the 4th of his career.
