= 1995 Croatia Open Umag – Singles =

Singles
- 1995 Croatia Open Umag
- 1994 Champion: (Spain) Alberto Berasategui

Final
- Champion: (Austria) Thomas Muster
- Runner-up: (Spain) Carlos Costa
- Score: 3–6, 7–6^{(7–5)}, 6–4

Details
- Draw: 32 (3WC/4Q)
- Seeds: 8

Events
Singles	Doubles
← 1994 ·	Croatia Open	· 1996 →

Alberto Berasategui was the defending champion, but lost in the quarterfinals to Carlos Costa.

Thomas Muster won the title by defeating Costa 3–6, 7–6^{(7–5)}, 6–4 in the final.

== Seeds ==
1. (Austria) Thomas Muster (champion)
2. (Spain) Alberto Berasategui (quarterfinals)
3. (Italy) Andrea Gaudenzi (semifinals)
4. (Austria) Gilbert Schaller (second round)
5. (Spain) Francisco Clavet (semifinals)
6. (Spain) Javier Sánchez (quarterfinals)
7. (Spain) Carlos Costa (final)
8. (Spain) Jordi Arrese (quarterfinals)

== Draw ==
=== Key ===
- Q = Qualifier
- WC = Wild card
- LL = Lucky loser
- Alt = Alternate
- ITF = ITF entry
- PR = Protected ranking
- SR = Special ranking
- SE = Special exempt
- JE = Junior exempt
- JR = Junior Accelerator Programme entrant
- CO = College Accelerator Programme entrant
- NG = Next Gen Accelerator Program entrant
- w/o = Walkover
- r = Retired
- d = Defaulted

=== Finals ===
Semifinals
1	(Austria) Thomas Muster	7	5	7^{7}
5	(Spain) Francisco Clavet	5	7	6^{3}
3	(Italy) Andrea Gaudenzi	3	4
7	(Spain) Carlos Costa	6	6

Final
1	(Austria) Thomas Muster	3	7^{7}	6
7	(Spain) Carlos Costa	6	6^{5}	4

=== Top half ===
First round
1	(Austria) T Muster	6	3
(Spain) R Carretero	2	0^{r}
(Spain) A Mancisidor	6	1	6
(Belgium) J Van Herck	4	6	2
(Belgium) K Goossens	2	0
(Argentina) H Gumy	6	6
(Argentina) G Etlis	6	5	1
8	(Spain) J Arrese	3	7	6
4	(Austria) G Schaller	7^{7}	6
(Hungary) S Noszály	6^{1}	4
Q	(Croatia) G Orešić	2	4
WC	(Sweden) M Gustafsson	6	6
(Spain) Á López Morón	4	7^{7}	6
WC	(Croatia) T Prpić	6	6^{1}	1
(Germany) P Baur	1	2
5	(Spain) F Clavet	6	6

Second round
1	(Austria) T Muster	6	6
(Spain) A Mancisidor	3	1
(Argentina) H Gumy	4	6	3
8	(Spain) J Arrese	6	1	6
4	(Austria) G Schaller	4	0
WC	(Sweden) M Gustafsson	6	6
(Spain) Á López Morón	6	5	3
5	(Spain) F Clavet	3	7	6

Quarterfinals
1	(Austria) T Muster	6	6
8	(Spain) J Arrese	1	3
WC	(Sweden) M Gustafsson	2	3
5	(Spain) F Clavet	6	6

Semifinals
1	(Austria) T Muster	7	5	7^{7}
5	(Spain) F Clavet	5	7	6^{3}

=== Bottom half ===
First round
6	(Spain) J Sánchez	6	1	6
Q	(United States) M Bauer	3	6	2
(Denmark) F Fetterlein	4	2
(Poland) W Kowalski	6	6
(Sweden) L Jönsson	3	7^{7}	6
(Spain) Ó Martínez	6	6^{4}	3
(Czech Republic) J Novák	3	4
3	(Italy) A Gaudenzi	6	6
7	(Spain) C Costa	7	7^{7}
Q	(Spain) M Górriz	5	6^{3}
(Czech Republic) R Vašek	3	7^{10}	3
(Argentina) F Davín	6	6^{8}	6
WC	(Croatia) E Rasberger	4	0
(Spain) T Carbonell	6	6
Q	(Spain) C Moyá	3	6	6^{3}
2	(Spain) A Berasategui	6	2	7^{7}

Second round
6	(Spain) J Sánchez	6	6
(Poland) W Kowalski	3	4
(Sweden) L Jönsson	1	4
3	(Italy) A Gaudenzi	6	6
7	(Spain) C Costa	6^{6}	6	6
(Argentina) F Davín	7^{8}	4	3
(Spain) T Carbonell	2	6	1
2	(Spain) A Berasategui	6	4	6

Quarterfinals
6	(Spain) J Sánchez	2	4
3	(Italy) A Gaudenzi	6	6
7	(Spain) C Costa	6	6
2	(Spain) A Berasategui	4	4

Semifinals
3	(Italy) A Gaudenzi	3	4
7	(Spain) C Costa	6	6
