= 1995 Croatia Open Umag =

- Date: 21–28 August
- Edition: 6th
- Category: World Series
- Draw: 32S / 16D
- Prize money: $375,000
- Surface: Clay / outdoor
- Location: Umag, Croatia

Champions

Singles
- (Austria) Thomas Muster

Doubles
- (Argentina) Luis Lobo / (Spain) Javier Sánchez
← 1994 ·	Croatia Open	· 1996 →

The 1995 Croatia Open Umag was a men's tennis tournament played on outdoor clay courts in Umag, Croatia that was part of the World Series of the 1995 ATP Tour. It was the sixth edition of the tournament and was held from 21 August through 28 August 1995. First-seeded Thomas Muster won his third singles title at the event after 1992 and 1993.

== Finals ==
=== Singles ===
(Austria) Thomas Muster defeated (Spain) Carlos Costa, 3–6, 7–6^{(7–5)}, 6–4

- It was Muster's 10th title of the year and the 34th of his career.

=== Doubles ===
(Argentina) Luis Lobo / (Spain) Javier Sánchez defeated (Sweden) David Ekerot / (Hungary) László Markovits, 6–4, 6–0

- It was Lobo's 2nd title of the year and the 3rd of his career. It was Sanchez's 2nd title of the year and the 22nd of his career.

== See also ==
- 1995 Zagreb Open
