= Udo Plamberger =

Austrian tennis player

- Full name: Udo Plamberger
- Country (sports): Austria
- Born: 1 January 1971 (age 54); Bad Ischl
- Prize money: $41,298

Singles
- Career record: 0–0
- Career titles: 0
- Highest ranking: No. 283 (9 September 1996)

Doubles
- Career record: 6–11
- Career titles: 0
- Highest ranking: No. 124 (26 May 1997)

Udo Plamberger (born 1 January 1971) is a former professional tennis player from Austria.

== Biography ==
Plamberger, who was born in Bad Ischl, played only doubles on the ATP Tour. Doubles partners included Pat Cash, Andrei Cherkasov and Younes El Aynaoui. It was with Ģirts Dzelde that he made his only final, the 1996 Croatia Open in Umag. They were runners-up, to Pablo Albano and Luis Lobo.

In Davis Cup competition, Plamberger featured in two ties for Austria. He first played in 1996 when Austria were in the World Group and debuted in the team's round one fixture against Brazil in São Paulo. He partnered Thomas Muster in the doubles, against Gustavo Kuerten and Jaime Oncins. The match had a controversial finish, a walk off instigated by Muster while 0–2 down in the fifth set handed the match to the Brazilians. It was in protest the crowd behaviour and gave Brazil a 2–1 lead in the tie. Muster, who later described the offending spectators as "animals", complained that members of the crowd had spat at him, shouted abuse, hurled objects and used mirrors to blind him during points. Plamberger was due to meet Kuerten in the first of the reverse singles, which would have been a live rubber, but due to security concerns a decision was made by the Austrians to withdraw from the final two matches, two walkovers that gave Brazil the tie. Despite Austrian protests, the result stood and the country lost its place in the World Group. The Austrian Tennis Federation was also fined for abandoning the tie. His only other appearance came against Croatia in Graz in 1997. Again he played in the doubles with Muster and they went down to Saša Hiršzon and Goran Ivanišević in straight sets.

Plamberger won one Challenger title, the doubles event at Příbram in 1998.

He now lives in the Gmunden District where he runs a sports management company.

== ATP Tour career finals ==
=== Doubles: 1 (0–1) ===
Result	No.	Date	Tournament	Surface	Partner	Opponents	Score
Loss	1.	Aug 1996	Umag, Croatia	Clay	(Latvia) Ģirts Dzelde	(Argentina) Pablo Albano (Argentina) Luis Lobo	4–6, 1–6

== Challenger titles ==
=== Doubles: (1) ===
No.	Year	Tournament	Surface	Partner	Opponents	Score
1.	1998	Příbram, Czech Republic	Clay	(Czech Republic) Ota Fukárek	(Czech Republic) Petr Pála (Czech Republic) Radek Štěpánek	2–6, 6–3, 6–4

== See also ==
- List of Austria Davis Cup team representatives
