= Karol Kučera =

Slovak tennis player (born 1974)

- Country (sports): Slovakia
- Residence: Monte Carlo, Monaco
- Born: 4 March 1974 (age 52) Bratislava, Czechoslovakia
- Height: 1.87 m (6 ft 1 1/2 in)
- Turned pro: 1992
- Retired: 2005
- Plays: Right-handed (two-handed backhand)
- Coach: Miloslav Mečíř (1997-2001); Marian Vajda (2001-2005)
- Prize money: $5,061,125

Singles
- Career record: 293–244
- Career titles: 6
- Highest ranking: No. 6 (14 September 1998)

Grand Slam singles results
- Australian Open: SF (1998)
- French Open: 3R (1996, 2000)
- Wimbledon: 4R (1999)
- US Open: QF (1998)

Other tournaments
- Tour Finals: RR (1998)
- Grand Slam Cup: SF (1998)
- Olympic Games: 2R (1996, 2000)

Doubles
- Career record: 34–41
- Career titles: 0
- Highest ranking: No. 131 (7 June 2004)

Team competitions
- Davis Cup: F (2005)
- Hopman Cup: W (1998)

Karol Kučera (Slovak pronunciation: [ˈkarɔl ˈkutʂera]; born 4 March 1974) is a Slovak tennis coach and former professional player. He achieved a career-high singles ranking of world No. 6 in September 1998, reaching the semifinals of the Australian Open the same year.

== Tennis career ==
Kučera turned professional in 1992. He was a member of the Czechoslovak Galea Cup teams in 1991 and 1992 and the 1992 European championship squad. In 1993 he qualified for his first Grand Slam at Roland Garros.

In 1995 when Kučera won his first ATP title in Rosmalen. In 1996 he played in the Summer Olympics in Atlanta where he lost to eventual gold medalist Andre Agassi.

A year later he won his second ATP title in Ostrava defeating Magnus Norman. He was runner-up in two other tournaments in Nottingham on grass to Greg Rusedski and Stuttgart Outdoor to Álex Corretja on clay.

Kučera's best year was in 1998, where he finished the year in the top 10, ranked World No. 8, which qualified him in the ATP Tour World Championship in Hannover. During the year Kučera won 2 titles in Sydney defeating Tim Henman and New Haven defeating Goran Ivanišević.

He reached another two finals, losing to Gustavo Kuerten in Stuttgart Outdoor and to World No. 1 Pete Sampras in Vienna. Overall in 1998, Kučera compiled a career high 53 match victories and earning $1,402,557.

Kučera achieved his best Grand Slam result in 1998 reaching the semi-finals of Australian Open where on his way he defeated Sergi Bruguera, Daniel Vacek, Daniel Nestor, Richard Fromberg and defending champion Pete Sampras in the quarter-finals, losing to eventual champion Petr Korda in 4 sets. Later the same year he reached the quarterfinals of the US Open.

In 1999, Kučera won his fifth ATP title in Basel defeating Tim Henman in the final. After 1999, Kučera struggled with form due to a right wrist and arm injury.

After some injury plagued years, Kučera found some form again in 2003 when he finished in the top 50 for the first time since 1999. During the year he won his sixth and final tour title in Copenhagen defeating Olivier Rochus in the final.

Later, Kučera was one of the contributing members on the Slovak team which reached the final of the Davis Cup in 2005, eventually losing to Croatia 2–3. He announced his retirement after the final.

== Style of play ==
Miloslav Mečíř known as the "Big Cat" was Kučera's coach from 1997 to 2001. Kučera was nicknamed the "Little Cat" because of his deceptive style of play and his fluid movement around the court resembling his coach.

Kučera was also coached for a time by Novak Djokovic's coach Marian Vajda.

== Post-career ==
In 2020, Kučera was elected an MP of the National Council of Slovakia representing the Ordinary People and Independent Personalities movement, along with fellow former tennis players Ján Krošlák and Romana Tabak.

== Career finals ==
=== Singles 12 (6–6) ===
Legend
Grand Slam (0-0)
Tennis Masters Cup (0-0)
ATP Masters Series (0-0)
ATP Championships Series (1-0)
ATP World Series (5-6)

Result	W-L	Date	Tournament	Surface	Opponent	Score
Loss	0–1	Aug 1994	Umag, Croatia	Clay	(Spain) Alberto Berasategui	2–6, 4–6
Win	1–1	Jun 1995	Rosmalen, Netherlands	Grass	(Sweden) Anders Järryd	7–6^{(9–7)}, 7–6^{(7–4)}
Win	2–1	Oct 1997	Ostrava, Czech Republic	Carpet (i)	(Sweden) Magnus Norman	6–2, retired
Loss	2–2	Jun 1997	Nottingham, Great Britain	Grass	(United Kingdom) Greg Rusedski	4–6, 5–7
Loss	2–3	Jul 1997	Stuttgart, Germany	Clay	(Spain) Álex Corretja	2–6, 5–7
Win	3–3	Jan 1998	Sydney, Australia	Hard	(United Kingdom) Tim Henman	7–5, 6–4
Loss	3–4	Jul 1998	Stuttgart, Germany	Clay	(Brazil) Gustavo Kuerten	6–4, 2–6, 4–6
Win	4–4	Aug 1998	New Haven, U.S.	Hard	(Croatia) Goran Ivanišević	6–4, 5–7, 6–2
Loss	4–5	Oct 1998	Vienna, Austria	Carpet (i)	(United States) Pete Sampras	3–6, 6–7^{(3–7)}, 1–6
Win	5–5	Oct 1999	Basel, Switzerland	Carpet (i)	(United Kingdom) Tim Henman	6–4, 7–6^{(12–10)}, 4–6, 4–6, 7–6^{(7–2)}
Win	6–5	Feb 2003	Copenhagen, Denmark	Hard (i)	(Belgium) Olivier Rochus	7–6^{(7–4)}, 6–4
Loss	6–6	Jan 2003	Chennai, India	Hard	(Thailand) Paradorn Srichaphan	3–6, 1–6

=== Doubles: 4 (0–4) ===
Result	W-L	Date	Tournament	Surface	Partner	Opponents	Score
Loss	0–1	Aug 1994	Umag, Croatia	Clay	(Kenya) Paul Wekesa	(Uruguay) Diego Pérez (Spain) Francisco Roig	2–6, 4–6
Loss	0–2	Oct 1996	Ostrava, Czech Republic	Carpet (i)	(Slovakia) Ján Krošlák	(Australia) Sandon Stolle (Czech Republic) Cyril Suk	6–7, 3–6
Loss	0–3	Jul 1997	Umag, Croatia	Clay	(Slovakia) Dominik Hrbatý	(Romania) Dinu Pescariu (Italy) Davide Sanguinetti	6–7, 4–6
Loss	0–4	Aug 1998	Amsterdam, Netherlands	Clay	(Slovakia) Dominik Hrbatý	(Australia) Jacco Eltingh (Netherlands) Paul Haarhuis	3–6, 2–6

== Singles performance timeline ==
Key
W	F	SF	QF	#R	RR	Q#	DNQ	A	NH

(W) winner; (F) finalist; (SF) semifinalist; (QF) quarterfinalist; (#R) rounds 4, 3, 2, 1; (RR) round-robin stage; (Q#) qualification round; (DNQ) did not qualify; (A) absent; (NH) not held; (SR) strike rate (events won / competed); (W–L) win–loss record.

Tournament	1990	1991	1992	1993	1994	1995	1996	1997	1998	1999	2000	2001	2002	2003	2004	2005	SR	W–L
Grand Slam tournaments
Australian Open	A	A	A	A	A	1R	3R	2R	SF	QF	1R	1R	2R	2R	2R	A	0 / 10	15–10
French Open	A	A	A	1R	2R	1R	3R	1R	1R	1R	3R	A	1R	1R	2R	A	0 / 11	6–11
Wimbledon	A	A	A	A	1R	2R	3R	1R	1R	4R	2R	A	A	3R	2R	2R	0 / 10	11–10
US Open	A	A	A	A	1R	1R	1R	1R	QF	A	1R	A	2R	3R	2R	2R	0 / 10	9–10
Win–loss	0–0	0–0	0–0	0–1	1–3	1–4	6–4	1–4	9–4	7–3	3–4	0–1	2–3	5–4	4–4	2–2	0 / 41	41–41
Year-end championship
ATP Tour World Championships	Did not qualify								RR	Did not qualify							0 / 1	0–3
Grand Slam Cup	Did not qualify								SF	DNQ	Not Held						0 / 1	2–1
ATP Masters Series
Indian Wells	A	A	A	A	A	A	A	A	2R	QF	1R	A	3R	A	A	A	0 / 4	6–4
Miami	A	A	A	A	A	A	2R	A	3R	4R	1R	1R	1R	1R	2R	A	0 / 8	5–8
Monte Carlo	A	A	A	A	A	A	A	1R	A	2R	QF	1R	A	1R	A	A	0 / 5	3–5
Hamburg	A	A	A	A	A	2R	1R	1R	SF	A	1R	A	A	1R	A	A	0 / 6	4–6
Rome	A	A	A	A	A	3R	1R	A	1R	QF	1R	A	A	1R	A	A	0 / 6	5–6
Canada	A	A	A	A	A	A	A	A	A	A	2R	A	A	QF	A	A	0 / 2	4–2
Cincinnati	A	A	A	A	A	A	A	A	A	A	1R	A	A	1R	A	A	0 / 2	0–2
Madrid^{1}	A	A	A	A	A	A	A	2R	2R	2R	A	A	A	2R	A	A	0 / 4	2–4
Paris	A	A	A	A	A	A	A	A	3R	2R	1R	2R	A	1R	A	A	0 / 5	2–5
Win–loss	0–0	0–0	0–0	0–0	0–0	3–2	1–3	1–3	6–6	8–6	4–8	1–3	2–2	4–8	1–1	0–0	0 / 42	31–42
Year-end ranking	862	352	210	159	54	79	63	24	8	17	73	101	83	40	91	310		

^{1}This event was held in Stockholm through 1994, Essen in 1995, and Stuttgart from 1996 through 2001.

== Top 10 wins ==
Season	1991	1992	1993	1994	1995	1996	1997	1998	1999	2000	2001	2002	2003	2004	2005	Total
Wins	0	0	0	1	0	2	6	5	5	5	1	1	1	0	1	28

#	Player	Rank	Event	Surface	Rd	Score	Kučera Rank
1994
1.	(Spain) Sergi Bruguera	5	Moscow, Russia	Carpet (i)	1R	3–6, 7–5, 6–4	62
1996
2.	(South Africa) Wayne Ferreira	9	Australian Open, Melbourne, Australia	Hard	2R	6–1, 6–3, 6–0	76
3.	(United States) Michael Chang	3	Long Island, United States	Hard	QF	6–4, 6–4	86
1997
4.	(Chile) Marcelo Ríos	8	Stuttgart, Germany	Clay	3R	6–4, 6–4	45
5.	(Spain) Sergi Bruguera	9	Stuttgart, Germany	Clay	QF	6–3, 2–6, 7–5	45
6.	(Croatia) Goran Ivanišević	8	Basel, Switzerland	Carpet (i)	1R	6–3, 6–3	32
7.	(Russia) Yevgeny Kafelnikov	6	Vienna, Austria	Carpet (i)	1R	6–4, 7–5	32
8.	(Croatia) Goran Ivanišević	4	Ostrava, Czech Republic	Carpet (i)	SF	6–3, ret.	32
9.	(Austria) Thomas Muster	8	Stockholm, Sweden	Hard (i)	2R	4–6, 6–3, 6–3	25
1998
10.	(United States) Pete Sampras	1	Australian Open, Melbourne, Australia	Hard	QF	6–4, 6–2, 6–7^{(5–7)}, 6–3	20
11.	(Czech Republic) Petr Korda	2	Antwerp, Belgium	Hard	QF	3–6, 6–4, 6–2	14
12.	(Chile) Marcelo Ríos	2	Stuttgart, Germany	Clay	SF	6–1, 6–7^{(8–10)}, 6–4	16
13.	(Netherlands) Richard Krajicek	6	New Haven, United States	Hard	SF	7–6^{(8–6)}, 6–4	13
14.	(United States) Andre Agassi	8	US Open, New York, United States	Hard	4R	6–3, 6–3, 6–7^{(5–7)}, 1–6, 6–3	9
1999
15.	(United Kingdom) Tim Henman	8	Rome, Italy	Clay	3R	4–6, 7–6^{(7–5)}, 6–3	12
16.	(Australia) Pat Rafter	3	World Team Cup, Düsseldorf, Germany	Clay	RR	6–3, 7–6^{(7–5)}	12
17.	(Russia) Yevgeny Kafelnikov	4	Davis Cup, Moscow, Russia	Clay	RR	6–1, 6–3, 6–4	13
18.	(United States) Andre Agassi	1	Basel, Switzerland	Carpet (i)	QF	6–4, 7–5	20
19.	(United Kingdom) Tim Henman	6	Basel, Switzerland	Carpet (i)	F	6–4, 7–6^{(12–10)}, 4–6, 4–6, 7–6^{(7–2)}	20
2000
20.	(Brazil) Gustavo Kuerten	4	Monte Carlo, Monaco	Clay	1R	6–4, 0–6, 6–2	42
21.	(United States) Andre Agassi	1	French Open, Paris, France	Clay	2R	2–6, 7–5, 6–1, 6–0	40
22.	(Sweden) Thomas Enqvist	7	Queen's Club, London, United Kingdom	Grass	2R	3–6, 7–6^{(8–6)}, 6–3	36
23.	(Russia) Yevgeny Kafelnikov	5	Long Island, United States	Hard	2R	6–1, 6–3	45
24.	(United Kingdom) Tim Henman	10	Summer Olympics, Sydney, Australia	Hard	1R	6–3, 6–2	43
2001
25.	(Russia) Marat Safin	1	Davis Cup, Bratislava, Slovakia	Hard (i)	RR	3–6, 4–6, 6–3, 7–5, 6–2	75
2002
26.	(United States) Andre Agassi	2	St. Petersburg, Russia	Hard (i)	2R	6–4, 6–4	79
2003
27.	(Spain) Juan Carlos Ferrero	2	Montreal, Canada	Hard	3R	6–3, 7–5	41
2005
28.	(Argentina) Mariano Puerta	10	Davis Cup, Bratislava, Slovakia	Hard (i)	RR	4–6, 6–3, 2–1, ret.	145
