= Juan Gisbert Schultze =

Spanish tennis player (born 1974)

- Full name: Juan Gisbert Schultze
- Country (sports): Spain
- Born: 13 April 1974 (age 51); Frankfurt, West Germany
- Prize money: $149,429

Singles
- Career record: 5–12
- Career titles: 0
- Highest ranking: No. 132 (11 October 1993)

Doubles
- Career record: 1–5
- Career titles: 0
- Highest ranking: No. 209 (6 June 1994)

Juan Gisbert Schultze (born 13 April 1974) is a former professional tennis player from Spain.

== Biography ==
Gisbert Schultze was born in Frankfurt, West Germany, before emigrating to Spain, the country of his father, Davis Cup player Juan Gisbert Sr. His mother, Margrit Schultze, is a German school teacher and the sister of Fed Cup player Helga Schultze. His uncles José María and Jorge played tennis professionally, and the former also represented Spain at the Davis Cup.

He was a losing finalist to Àlex Corretja in the 16s competition of the 1990 Orange Bowl. In the doubles event he partnered with Corretja and the pair finished runners-up. Residing in Barcelona, Gisbert Schultze was twice a member of Spain's Galea Cup winning teams, in 1991 and 1992.

A serve and volleyer, Gisbert Schultze turned professional in 1992 and won two Challenger titles that year, on clay courts in Buenos Aires and Naples, Florida. At ATP Tour level he came close to an upset win over top seed Thomas Muster at the 1992 Cologne Open, losing two tiebreaks after winning the first set. In 1993 he had his best season on the ATP Tour. He qualified for the German Open (now Hamburg Masters) and made the quarter-finals of the Croatia Open, with wins over Jordi Arrese and Alberto Mancini, before he again lost to Muster. At his next tournament after Umag, in Palermo, he managed to beat Alberto Berasategui.

He has been a high ranking padel tennis player since retiring from the ATP Tour.

== Challenger titles ==
=== Singles: (2) ===
No.	Year	Tournament	Surface	Opponent	Score
1.	1992	Buenos Aires, Argentina	Clay	(Germany) Carsten Arriens	6–1, 7–6
2.	1992	Naples, United States	Clay	(Germany) Karsten Braasch	7–5, 1–6, 6–4

=== Doubles: (1) ===
No.	Year	Tournament	Surface	Partner	Opponents	Score
1.	1993	Venice, Italy	Clay	(Argentina) Horacio de la Peña	(Mexico) Oliver Fernández (Austria) Gilbert Schaller	6–1, 6–3
