= Ģirts Dzelde =

Latvian tennis player (born 1963)

- Country (sports): Soviet Union; Latvia
- Born: 16 July 1963 (age 63) Riga, Latvia
- Height: 1.73 m (5 ft 8 in)
- Plays: Right-handed
- Prize money: $ 240,274

Singles
- Career record: 5–12
- Career titles: 0
- Highest ranking: No. 273 (29 July 1991)

Grand Slam singles results
- French Open: 1R (1994)
- Wimbledon: 2R (1991)
- US Open: 1R (1993)

Doubles
- Career record: 44–79
- Career titles: 0
- Highest ranking: No. 108 (4 October 1993)

Grand Slam doubles results
- French Open: 2R (1992)
- Wimbledon: 1R (1982)
Medal record
Representing Soviet Union
Tennis
Summer Universiade
Silver medal – second place	1987 Zagreb	Doubles

Ģirts Dzelde (born 16 July 1963) is a former professional tennis player from Latvia, currently the coach of Latvian Davis Cup team. He achieved a career-high singles ranking of World No. 273 in 1991 and a career-high doubles ranking of World No. 108 in 1993. Dzelde did not win any ATP level titles in singles or doubles, but finished runner-up in three ATP doubles events.

Dzelde participated in 17 Davis Cup ties for Latvia from 1993 to 2000, posting a 16–11 record in singles and a 10–6 record in doubles.

== Career finals ==
=== Doubles (3 losses) ===
Result	No.	Date	Tournament	Surface	Partner	Opponents	Score
Loss	1.	Mar 1992	Casablanca, Morocco	Clay	(United States) T. J. Middleton	(Argentina) Horacio de la Peña (Mexico) Jorge Lozano	6–2, 4–6, 6–7
Loss	2.	Mar 1993	Casablanca, Morocco	Clay	(Croatia) Goran Prpić	(United States) Mike Bauer (South Africa) Piet Norval	5–7, 6–7
Loss	3.	Aug 1996	Umag, Croatia	Clay	(Austria) Udo Plamberger	(Argentina) Pablo Albano (Argentina) Luis Lobo	4–6, 1–6
