= Federico Sánchez =

Spanish tennis player (1970–2014)

- Full name: Federico Sánchez Andreu
- Country (sports): Spain
- Born: 4 December 1970; Granada, Spain
- Died: 25 August 2014 (aged 43); Oliete, Spain
- Prize money: $134,015

Singles
- Career record: 8–10
- Career titles: 0
- Highest ranking: No. 138 (1 August 1994)

Doubles
- Highest ranking: No. 405 (21 June 1993)

Federico "Fede" Sánchez (4 December 1970 – 25 August 2014) was a professional tennis player from Spain.

== Biography ==
Born in Granada, Sánchez turned professional in 1991 and was based during his career in Barcelona. He won the 1992 Pescara Challenger tournament and while on the Challenger circuit also registered wins over Marcelo Ríos and Alberto Berasategui. In 1993 he reached his highest ranking of 138 in the world with career best performances on the ATP Tour. At Kitzbuhel he won two matches to make the round of 16, then in Palermo made it through to the semi-finals. His run at Palermo included a win over the 40th ranked Emilio Sánchez and a quarter-final victory over Carlos Costa, who retired hurt after losing the first set. He was beaten in the semi-finals by Sergi Bruguera.

For many years after his retirement he taught tennis in Almería. In 2014 he died aged 43, in an accident involving a flight of stairs. Club de Tenis Indalo, the tennis club where he coached, holds an annual memorial tournament in his honour.

== Challenger titles ==
=== Singles: (1) ===
No.	Year	Tournament	Surface	Opponent	Score
1.	1992	Pescara, Italy	Clay	(Italy) Massimo Cierro	6–2, 7–5
