= Gábor Köves =

Hungarian tennis player

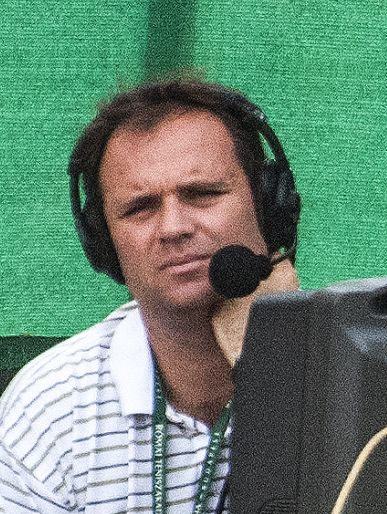
- A picture of Gábor Köves at the 2011 Budapest Open tennis competition, in the commentator position of the center court of the Roman Tennis Academy, Budapest.
- Country (sports): Hungary
- Residence: Budapest, Hungary
- Born: 7 January 1970 (age 55) Budapest, Hungary
- Height: 1.88 m (6 ft 2 in)
- Turned pro: 1993
- Plays: Right-handed
- Prize money: US$214,507

Singles
- Career record: 0–0
- Highest ranking: No. 702 (14 April 1990)

Grand Slam singles results
- US Open: -

Doubles
- Career record: 59–77
- Highest ranking: No. 79 (12 October 1998)

Grand Slam doubles results
- Australian Open: 1R (1997, 1998, 1999)
- French Open: 2R (1998, 1999)
- Wimbledon: 2R (1998)
- US Open: 2R (1996)

Mixed doubles

Grand Slam mixed doubles results
- Wimbledon: 2R (1998)

Coaching career (2003–)
- Petra Mandula (2003–2005); (Hungary) Hungarian Olympic Tennis team* (2004); Ágnes Szávay (2010–2013); Hungary Davis Cup team (2016–present); *(only women represented in Athen)

Gábor Köves (born 7 January 1970) is a retired Hungarian Olympian tennis player. Seoul gold medalists Ken Flach and Robert Seguso stopped him and partner László Markovits in the second round in the 1988 Summer Olympics.

Gabor Köves is currently the captain of the Hungary Davis Cup team since December 2016 when Zoltán Kuhárszky stepped down due to conflict of interest, because he became Máté Valkusz's personal coach who is a member of the Hungarian Davis Cup team.

== Titles ==
=== Doubles (4) ===
Legend (singles)
Grand Slam (0)
Tennis Masters Cup (0)
ATP Masters Series (0)
ATP Tour (0)
Challengers (4)

| No. | Date | Tournament | Surface | Partner | Opponents | Score |
|---|---|---|---|---|---|---|
| 1. | 20 August 2000 | Kyiv | Clay | (Argentina) Cristian Kordasz | (Uzbekistan) Oleg Ogorodov (Russia) Andrei Stoliarov | 6–4, 7–5 |
| 2. | 20 September 1998 | Budapest II | Clay | (Austria) Thomas Strenberger | (Czech Republic) Leoš Friedl (Czech Republic) Radek Štěpánek | 6–4, 6–4 |
| 3. | 19 October 1997 | Guayaquil | Clay | (Sweden) Tomas Nydahl | (Argentina) Diego del Río (Argentina) Mariano Puerta | 2–6, 6–3, 7–6 |
| 4. | 20 August 1995 | Geneva | Clay | (South Africa) Clinton Ferreira | (Switzerland) Stéphane Manai (Switzerland) Patrick Mohr | 6–4, 6–2 |
