= Luis Lobo =

Argentine tennis player

- Country (sports): Argentina
- Born: 9 November 1970 (age 56) Buenos Aires, Argentina
- Height: 1.80 m (5 ft 11 in)
- Turned pro: 1994
- Retired: 2002
- Plays: Right-handed
- Prize money: $913,682

Singles
- Career record: 2–3
- Career titles: 0
- Highest ranking: No. 167 (7 October 1991)

Grand Slam singles results
- US Open: Q3 (1992)

Doubles
- Career record: 192–130
- Career titles: 12
- Highest ranking: No. 12 (21 July 1997)

Grand Slam doubles results
- Australian Open: QF (1998)
- French Open: 3R (1996)
- Wimbledon: 2R (2002)
- US Open: QF (1996, 1998)

Coaching career (1998–)
- Marcelo Ríos (1998–2001); Carlos Moyá 2006–2010(ret.); David Nalbandian 2009–; Juan Mónaco (2004–2011)

Coaching achievements
- Coachee singles titles total: 12(R)-1(Moya)-1(N)-3(Mon.)=17(total)
- Coachee doubles titles total: 3(R)-2(Mon.)=5(total)
- List of notable tournaments (with champion): 1998 Rome, Miami, Indian Wells Masters (Rios); 1998 Grand Slam Cup (Rios); 1999 Hamburg Masters (Rios); 1998 Australian Open (Rios doubles); 1999 Monte Carlo Masters (Rios doubles)
Medal record
Representing Argentina
Tennis
Pan American Games
Gold medal – first place	1995 Mar del Plata	Men's Doubles

Luis Gustavo Lobo (born 9 November 1970) is a retired professional male tennis player from Argentina, who won the gold medal in the men's doubles competition at the 1995 Pan American Games.

He reached his career high doubles ranking, World No. 12, on 21 July 1997. He is currently a coach, and has worked with players including Spain's Carlos Moyà and Argentina's Juan Mónaco.

== Career finals ==
=== Doubles: 20 (12 wins, 8 losses) ===
Legend Grand Slam (0) Tennis Masters Cup (0) ATP Masters Series (1) ATP Championship Series (2) ATP Tour (9)	Titles by surface Hard (2) Clay (10) Grass (0) Carpet (0)

Result	W/L	Date	Tournament	Surface	Partner	Opponents	Score
Win	1–0	Oct 1994	Athens, Greece	Clay	(Spain) Javier Sánchez	(Italy) Cristian Brandi (Italy) Federico Mordegan	5–7, 6–1, 6–4
Loss	1–1	Jan 1995	Auckland, New Zealand	Hard	(Spain) Javier Sánchez	(Canada) Grant Connell (United States) Patrick Galbraith	6–4, 6–3
Loss	1–2	Mar 1995	Scottsdale, U.S.	Hard	(Spain) Javier Sánchez	(United States) Trevor Kronemann (Australia) David Macpherson	4–6, 6–3, 6–4
Loss	1–3	May 1995	Monte-Carlo, Monaco	Clay	(Spain) Javier Sánchez	(Netherlands) Jacco Eltingh (Netherlands) Paul Haarhuis	6–1, 6–2
Loss	1–4	May 1995	Munich, Germany	Clay	(Spain) Javier Sánchez	(United States) Trevor Kronemann (Australia) David Macpherson	6–3, 6–4
Win	2–4	Jul 1995	Gstaad, Switzerland	Clay	(Spain) Javier Sánchez	(France) Arnaud Boetsch (Switzerland) Marc Rosset	6–7, 7–6, 7–6
Win	3–4	Aug 1995	Umag, Croatia	Clay	(Spain) Javier Sánchez	(Sweden) David Ekerot (Hungary) László Markovits	6–4, 6–0
Win	4–4	Apr 1996	Barcelona, Spain	Clay	(Spain) Javier Sánchez	(United Kingdom) Neil Broad (South Africa) Piet Norval	2–6, 6–4, 6–4
Loss	4–5	May 1996	Prague, Czech Republic	Clay	(Spain) Javier Sánchez	(Russia) Yevgeny Kafelnikov (Czech Republic) Daniel Vacek	6–3, 6–7, 6–3
Win	5–5	Aug 1996	Umag, Croatia	Clay	(Argentina) Pablo Albano	(Latvia) Ģirts Dzelde (Austria) Udo Plamberger	6–4, 6–1
Win	6–5	Jan 1997	Sydney Outdoor, Australia	Hard	(Spain) Javier Sánchez	(Netherlands) Paul Haarhuis (Netherlands) Jan Siemerink	6–4, 6–7, 6–3
Win	7–5	Mar 1997	Scottsdale, U.S.	Hard	(Spain) Javier Sánchez	(Sweden) Jonas Björkman (United States) Rick Leach	6–3, 6–3
Win	8–5	May 1997	Hamburg, Germany	Clay	(Spain) Javier Sánchez	(United Kingdom) Neil Broad (South Africa) Piet Norval	6–3, 7–6
Win	9–5	Oct 1997	Bucharest, Romania	Clay	(Spain) Javier Sánchez	(Netherlands) Hendrik Jan Davids (Argentina) Daniel Orsanic	7–5, 7–5
Win	10–5	Nov 1997	Bogotá, Colombia	Clay	(Brazil) Fernando Meligeni	(Morocco) Karim Alami (Venezuela) Maurice Ruah	6–1, 6–3
Win	11–5	Jul 2001	Kitzbühel, Austria	Clay	(Spain) Àlex Corretja	(Sweden) Simon Aspelin (Australia) Andrew Kratzmann	6–1, 6–4
Loss	11–6	Jul 2001	Amsterdam, Netherlands	Clay	(Spain) Àlex Corretja	(Netherlands) Paul Haarhuis (Netherlands) Sjeng Schalken	6–4, 6–2
Loss	11–7	Feb 2002	Viña del Mar, Chile	Clay	(Argentina) Lucas Arnold Ker	(Argentina) Gastón Etlis (Argentina) Martin Rodríguez	6–3, 6–4
Loss	11–8	Apr 2002	Casablanca, Morocco	Clay	(Argentina) Martín García	(Australia) Stephen Huss (South Africa) Myles Wakefield	6–4, 6–2
Win	12–8	Sep 2002	Palermo, Italy	Clay	(Argentina) Lucas Arnold Ker	(Czech Republic) František Čermák (Czech Republic) Leoš Friedl	6–4, 4–6, 6–2

==== Mixed doubles: 1 finals (1 runner-ups) ====
Result	Year	Championship	Surface	Partner	Opponents	Score
Loss	1998	French Open	Clay	(United States) Serena Williams	(United States) Justin Gimelstob (United States) Venus Williams	3–6, 4–6
