= Clinton Ferreira =

South African tennis player

- Full name: Clinton Ferreira
- Country (sports): South Africa
- Born: 5 July 1966 (age 60) Pretoria, South Africa
- Plays: Right-handed
- Prize money: $71,930

Singles
- Highest ranking: No. 529 (6 June 1994)

Doubles
- Career record: 3–21
- Career titles: 0
- Highest ranking: No. 131 (28 August 1995)

Grand Slam doubles results
- Australian Open: 1R (1995, 1996, 1997)
- US Open: 1R (1996)

Clinton Ferreira (born 5 July 1966) is a former professional tennis player from South Africa.

== Biography ==
Ferreira, who comes from Pretoria, was a two-time All-American doubles player at the University of Alabama. In 1986 he partnered with Gregg Hahn to reach the NCAA semi-finals, which set a college record. He later partnered with younger brother Ellis Ferreira to win the 1989 Southeastern Conference doubles title. The pair were one of the highest ranked doubles combinations in the ITCA collegiate rankings. In 1989 he also competed in the NCAA singles championships and with his brother in the doubles made the round of 16.

During the 1990s he competed professionally on the ATP Tour as a doubles specialist and won a total of three Challenger titles. He featured in the main draws of both the Australian Open and US Open in men's doubles competition. In 1998 he retired from professional tennis.

Clinton Ferreira now runs a wine merchant company base in Libourne, France, called Connaisseur Club. He is also treasurer of the Bordeaux Giscours cricket team.

== Challenger titles ==
=== Doubles: (3) ===
No.	Year	Tournament	Surface	Partner	Opponents	Score
1.	1995	Ostend, Germany	Clay	(North Macedonia) Aleksandar Kitinov	(Portugal) Emanuel Couto (Czech Republic) Tomáš Anzari	3–6, 7–6, 6–3
2.	1995	Geneva, Switzerland	Clay	(Hungary) Gábor Köves	(Switzerland) Stephane Manai (Switzerland) Patrick Mohr	6–4, 6–2
3.	1997	Réunion, France	Hard	(Netherlands) Jan Siemerink	(Spain) Álex Calatrava (France) Jérôme Golmard	6–2, 6–3
