= David Ekerot =

Swedish tennis player

- Country (sports): Sweden
- Born: 1 February 1970 (age 56) Lund, Sweden
- Height: 1.88 m (6 ft 2 in)
- Turned pro: 1995
- Plays: Left-handed
- Prize money: $127,909

Singles
- Career record: 0–0
- Highest ranking: No. 699 (25 Jul 1994)

Doubles
- Career record: 25–37
- Career titles: 2
- Highest ranking: No. 52 (28 Apr 1997)

Grand Slam doubles results
- Australian Open: 2R (1996)
- French Open: 1R (1996, 1997)
- Wimbledon: 1R (1996, 1997)
- US Open: 1R (1996, 1997)

Mixed doubles

Grand Slam mixed doubles results
- Wimbledon: 1R (1997)

David Ekerot (born 1 February 1970) is a former professional tennis player from Sweden. He enjoyed most of his tennis success while playing doubles. During his career he won 2 doubles titles. He achieved a career-high doubles ranking of world No. 52 in 1997.

After his tennis career he became a musician. His most known songs are The Full Life and Burning Books.

== Career finals ==
=== Doubles (2 titles, 1 runner-up) ===
Result	W/L	Date	Tournament	Surface	Partner	Opponents	Score
Loss	0–1	Aug 1995	Umag, Croatia	Clay	(Hungary) László Markovits	(Argentina) Luis Lobo (Spain) Javier Sánchez	4–6, 0–6
Win	1–1	Jul 1996	Båstad, Sweden	Clay	(United States) Jeff Tarango	(Australia) Joshua Eagle (Sweden) Peter Nyborg	6–4, 3–6, 6–4
Win	2–1	Sep 1996	Bucharest, Romania	Clay	(United States) Jeff Tarango	(South Africa) David Adams (Netherlands) Menno Oosting	7–6, 7–6
