= Tomislav Prpić =

Croatian tennis player

- Country (sports): Croatia
- Born: 10 February 1972 (age 54)
- Prize money: $8,815

Singles
- Career record: 0–1
- Highest ranking: No. 705 (15 May 1995)

Doubles
- Career record: 1–3
- Highest ranking: No. 384 (24 Apr 1995)

Tomislav Prpić (born 10 February 1972) is a Croatian former professional tennis player.

Active on tour in the 1990s, Prpić competed mainly in satellite tournaments but featured in the singles main draw of the 1995 Croatia Open, where he lost his first round match to Álex López Morón in three sets. He was a doubles quarter-finalist at the Croatia Open the following year.
