= Thomas Muster =

Austrian tennis player

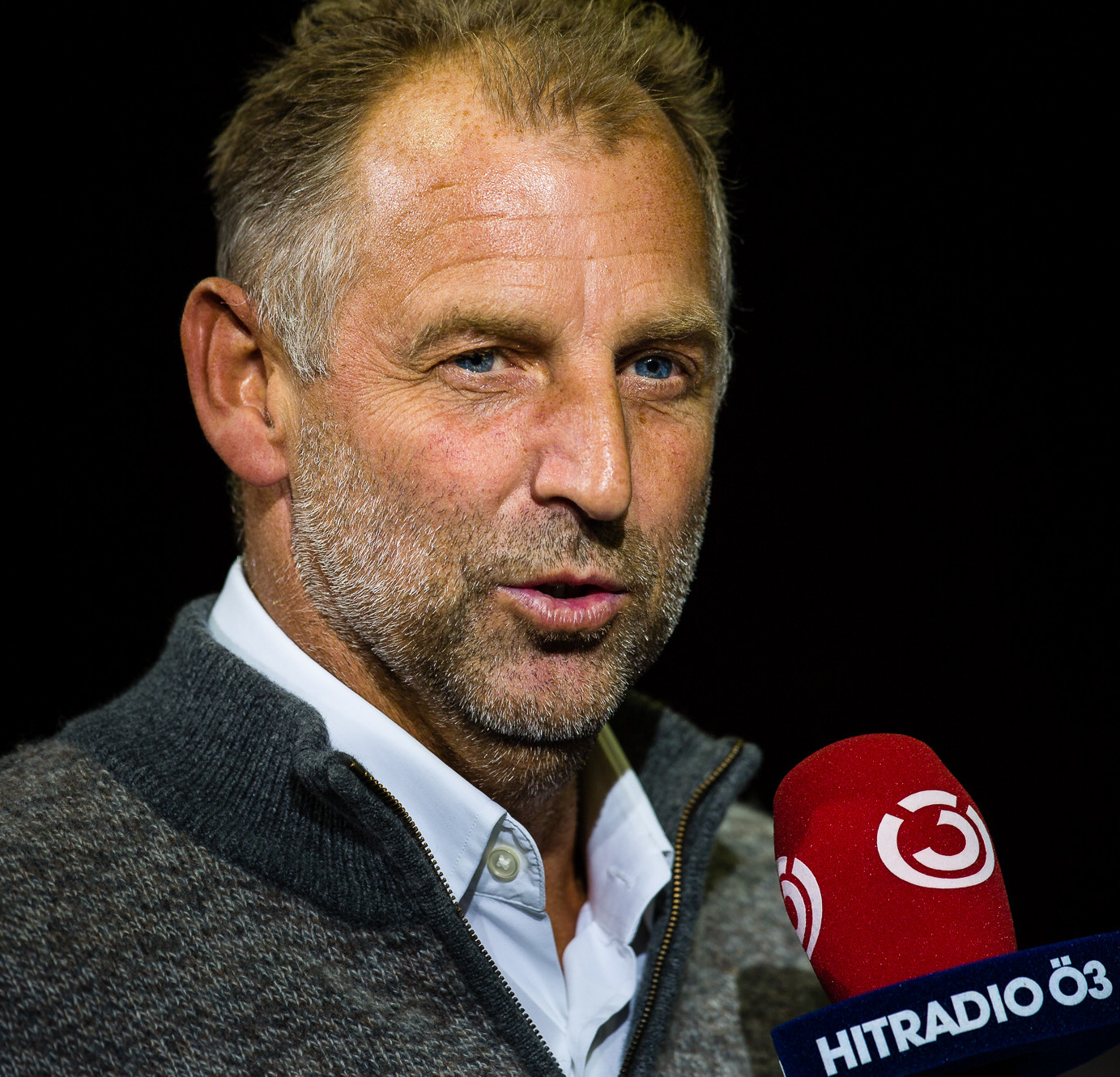
- Muster in 2016
- Country (sports): Austria
- Born: 2 October 1967 (age 59) Leibnitz, Austria
- Height: 1.80 m (5 ft 11 in)
- Turned pro: 1985
- Retired: 1999 (2011)
- Plays: Left-handed (one-handed backhand)
- Coach: Ronnie Leitgeb (1984–1999); Ronald Schmidt (2010–2011)
- Prize money: US$12,266,977

Singles
- Career record: 625–273 (69.6%)
- Career titles: 44
- Highest ranking: No. 1 (12 February 1996)

Grand Slam singles results
- Australian Open: SF (1989, 1997)
- French Open: W (1995)
- Wimbledon: 1R (1987, 1992, 1993, 1994)
- US Open: QF (1993, 1994, 1996)

Other tournaments
- Tour Finals: RR (1990, 1995, 1996, 1997)
- Grand Slam Cup: 1R (1990, 1993, 1994, 1995, 1997)
- Olympic Games: 2R (1984, demonstration event)

Doubles
- Career record: 56–91 (38.1%)
- Career titles: 1
- Highest ranking: No. 94 (7 November 1988)

Grand Slam doubles results
- Australian Open: 1R (1989, 1990)
- US Open: 2R (1986)

Team competitions
- Davis Cup: SF (1990)

Thomas Muster (German: [ˈmʊstɐ]; born 2 October 1967) is an Austrian former professional tennis player. He was ranked as the world No. 1 in men's singles by the Association of Tennis Professionals (ATP). Muster won 44 ATP Tour-level singles titles, including the 1995 French Open and eight Masters titles. One of the world's leading clay court players in the 1990s, at his peak he was called "The King of Clay". He is the first Austrian to win a major singles title, followed by Dominic Thiem at the 2020 US Open.

== Tennis career ==
=== Juniors ===
Muster first came to prominence when he reached the final of the French Open junior tournament and the Orange Bowl juniors tournament in 1985.

=== Pro tour ===
Muster played his first matches at the top-level in 1984, as a junior player, at the age of 16. In 1984, he played his first match for Austria in the Davis Cup. He also played at the 1984 Summer Olympics in Los Angeles, and in two tournaments on Austrian soil, the clay-court event in Kitzbühel and the indoor carpet event in Vienna.

Muster turned professional in 1985, regularly playing in Challenger tournaments throughout the year, winning in Belo Horizonte, as well as continuing to play in many top-level tournaments. Muster won his first top-level tournament at the Dutch Open in Hilversum in 1986.

In 1988, Muster reached six top-level tournament finals, winning four of them, in Boston, Bordeaux, Prague and Bari. Muster finished the year ranked 16th in the world.

Early in 1989, Muster became the first Austrian to reach the semifinals of the Australian Open, eventually losing in four sets to world No. 1, Ivan Lendl on a very hot day. Shortly after that, he became the first Austrian to reach the world top 10. On the night of 31 March 1989, he defeated Yannick Noah in five sets in the semifinals of the Lipton International Players Championships in Key Biscayne, Florida, to set up a final against Lendl. However, in the early hours of 1 April 1989, just hours after his semifinal victory, he was struck by a drunk driver, severing ligaments in his left knee and forcing him to default the final. Muster flew back to Vienna to undergo surgery. With the aid of a special chair designed to allow him to practice hitting balls while recovering from knee surgery, he returned to competitive tennis in September 1989.

Muster's comeback continued in 1990, when he won three top-level tournaments on clay (including the Italian Open, defeating Andrés Gómez in the semifinals and Andrei Chesnokov in the final) and one title on hardcourt. Muster reached the semifinals of the 1990 French Open, losing in straight sets to the eventual champion, Andrés Gómez. He also helped Austria reach the semifinals of the Davis Cup, where they were eliminated 3–2 by the United States, despite winning both of his singles rubbers against Michael Chang and Andre Agassi. That year, he was named the ATP Tour's "Comeback Player of the Year."

In 1990, Muster won the Austrian Sportsman of the Year award. He won two more top-level tournaments in 1991, and three more in 1992 (all on clay courts), with the biggest of these titles being the 1992 Monte Carlo title, where he defeated Aaron Krickstein in the final. In 1993, Muster won seven titles. Muster's win–loss record on clay in 1993 was 55–10, although he failed to win any of the four big clay-court events of the year.

At both the 1992 and 1993 French Opens, Muster was defeated by the reigning French Open and Australian Open champion Jim Courier. At the 1994 French Open, he won his second round match against Andre Agassi in five sets but was then defeated by the serve-and-volley play of Patrick Rafter in the next round, with Rafter's four set victory denying Muster a match against the reigning French Open champion Sergi Bruguera.

Muster won three clay-court titles in 1994. In March 1994, he defeated Michael Stich of Germany in a first round Davis Cup tie in Graz, 6–4, 6–7, 4–6, 6–3, 12–10, after saving a match point when trailing at 7–8 in the fifth set. Despite Muster's win over Stich bringing Austria level at 2–2 in the tie, it was Germany who eventually won the decisive fifth rubber.

In 1995, Muster enjoyed the best year of his career winning 12 tournaments, with 11 of those tournaments won on clay-courts. Between February and June 1995, Muster won 40 consecutive matches on clay (the longest winning streak on the surface since Björn Borg had won 46 matches between 1977 and 1979). At the 1995 Monte Carlo Masters, he defeated Andrea Gaudenzi in the semifinals, despite struggling heavily in the latter stages of the match due to having a shortage of glucose in his blood and suffering a 40° fever, which required a brief spell in hospital after the match. The next day, he won the final against Boris Becker, in five sets, with Muster surviving two championship points in the fourth set tiebreak, the first of which saw Becker double-faulting after going for a big second serve. He went on to win his second Italian Open title, defeating Sergi Bruguera in the final. At the 1995 French Open, Muster won his first and only Grand Slam singles title, defeating Yevgeny Kafelnikov in the semifinals and comfortably beating 1989 champion Michael Chang in the final in straight sets. Muster was the only Austrian to win a Grand Slam singles title until Dominic Thiem won the 2020 US Open. His win–loss record on clay in 1995 was a remarkable 65–2. Although his record on other surfaces was less impressive, a late season victory over Pete Sampras on fast indoor carpet during his run to the title of the 1995 Eurocard Open (October) – Singles Masters event in Essen, Germany, gave Muster an outside chance at finishing the year no. 1; however, Sampras finished the year at no. 1. Of the 12 tournaments that Muster won in 1995, he saved at least one match point held against him during six of them, with those six tournaments being held in Estoril, Barcelona, Monte Carlo, St. Pölten, Stuttgart Outdoor and Umag.

In 1995, Muster won the Austrian Sportsman of the Year award for the second time. He continued to rack up clay-court victories in 1996. He won seven tournaments, six of them titles he successfully defended after winning them the year before. These 1996 tournament victories included his third Monte Carlo title, where he defeated clay court specialist Albert Costa in the final, and his third Italian Open title, defeating Richard Krajicek in the final. Muster's win–loss record on clay in 1996 was an impressive 46–3. This made his 1995–96 record on the surface 111–5, which was, at the time, the best two-year clay-court record since the open era began in 1968. Despite Muster's continued dominance on clay-courts in 1996, he was upset in the Round of 16 at the 1996 French Open, losing to eventual finalist Michael Stich in four sets. In July 1996, in the final of the 1996 Mercedes Cup in Stuttgart, Muster defeated newly crowned French Open champion Yevgeny Kafelnikov in three straight sets.

In February 1996, Muster attained the world no. 1 ranking for the first time. He held the ranking initially for just one week, and then regained it for five weeks over March and April 1996. The validity of Muster's number one ranking was called into question by top Americans Pete Sampras and Andre Agassi, who argued that he had achieved the top spot based almost solely on his clay court results, although Muster had beaten Sampras on indoor carpet at the 1995 Masters event in Essen, Germany, and Agassi had only won tournaments on hardcourt in 1995.

In 1997, Muster enjoyed the best results of his career on hardcourt. He reached the semifinals of the 1997 Australian Open, losing to eventual champion Pete Sampras. He then went on to win the tournament in Dubai, defeating Goran Ivanišević in the final. Following a semifinal showing at the 1997 Newsweek Champions Cup and the State Farm Evert Cup in Indian Wells, California, Muster won his biggest title on hardcourt at the 1997 Miami Masters, the same tournament where his career had nearly ended eight years earlier. After a semifinal victory over Jim Courier—his third successive win over the American in early 1997—Muster defeated Sergi Bruguera in three straight sets in the final. Bruguera had defeated Sampras in the semifinals.

In August 1997, Muster made a hard-fought run to the championship round of the Cincinnati Masters before losing the final to Sampras. Having reached the semifinals or better in four of the five most important hard court events of the season to date, Muster was one of the favorites at the 1997 US Open – Men's singles. However, as the fifth seed, Muster received a difficult first round draw and fell in four sets to Great Britain's Tim Henman, then ranked world no. 21. Muster played decently indoors during the fall of 1997, reaching the semifinals of the 1997 IPB Czech Indoor in Ostrava, Czech Republic, and the quarterfinals of the 1997 Paris Open. As an injury-replacement alternate, the Austrian made his fourth and final appearance in the ATP's year-end tournament, the 1997 ATP Tour World Championships – Singles, losing his lone match to Carlos Moyá. Muster finished 1997 ranked world no. 9.

For the season, Muster achieved a 29–8 win–loss record on hardcourt, but he only won nine out of 18 matches on clay. Muster's 1997 French Open campaign ended in the third round when unseeded Gustavo Kuerten, then ranked at 66 in the world, defeated him in five sets despite Muster holding a 3–0 lead in the fifth set. Kuerten went on to win the 1997 French Open title and usher in a new era on clay.

With a renewed focus on clay and the 1998 French Open, Muster enjoyed a better April and May than he had the year prior. A strong run to the semifinals on the hard courts of Indian Wells—where he beat top-ranked Sampras along the way—in March 1998 buoyed Muster onto the European clay. In his next event and first clay appearance of 1998, Muster reached the last top-level tournament final of his career in Estoril, losing to Alberto Berasategui in three sets.

In early May 1998, Muster defeated sixth-ranked Yevgeny Kafelnikov en route to the quarterfinals of the 1998 ATP German Open in Hamburg, Germany. At the 1998 French Open, Muster scored several nice wins to reach the quarterfinals before losing to Félix Mantilla in four sets, with Mantilla getting revenge for his contentious 1998 Italian Open defeat to Muster a few weeks prior.

Muster's 1998 results faded after the spring, and he reached just one semifinal (Mallorca) and one quarterfinal (Boston) for the remainder of the year. Muster opened 1999 with a semifinal showing in Sydney before struggling over the next few months, winning just two of his 12 matches after Sydney. Following his first-round loss to Nicolás Lapentti at the 1999 French Open, Muster quietly disappeared from the ATP Tour at the age of 31. Muster remains the only male world No. 1 singles player who never managed to win a singles match at Wimbledon throughout his whole career (only made four appearances).

Muster only lost one Davis Cup singles match on clay in his career, when Goran Ivanišević defeated him in April 1997, 6–7, 7–5, 6–7, 6–2, 7–5, despite Muster having won 112 of his previous 117 matches on clay going into the match. Muster's overall Davis Cup win–loss record, counting both singles and doubles matches, was 45–18. Muster's win–loss record in Davis Cup singles matches was 36–8, while his win–loss record in Davis Cup singles matches on clay was 29–1. Muster has more match wins in Davis Cup than any other Austrian tennis player.

After he stopped playing tennis after the 1999 French Open, Muster moved to Noosa Heads, Australia, where he had officially resided since 1996, and married television presenter Jo Beth Taylor in 2000. The couple have a son, Christian, who was born in 2001. Muster and Taylor separated in 2002 and divorced in 2005. In 2003, Muster moved back to Austria, to work as a coach and captain of the Austrian Davis Cup team. He has played tennis on the ATP Champions Tour. In April 2010, Muster married Caroline Ofner, and they have a daughter, Maxim, who was born in 2009.

On 16 June 2010, at the age of 42, Muster announced his comeback to professional tennis. In July 2010, he played the first match of his comeback in a Challenger tournament in Braunschweig, where he lost in the first round. He went on to play in three Challenger tournaments in Kitzbühel, Como, and Rijeka. Eventually, in his fifth Challenger tournament in Ljubljana, Muster won his first comeback match, against Borut Puc of Croatia, which brought Muster back into the ATP singles ranking list at world number 988. Muster finished 2010 ranked at world number 980.

On 13 September 2011, Muster won a second match after his comeback, in the Todi Challenger, against the fifth seeded Argentinian Leonardo Mayer. His next opponent was countryman Martin Fischer, to whom Muster lost. On 19 September 2011, Muster reached world No. 847. He then lost his next match, at the Challenger tournament in Palermo, to Alessio di Mauro.

In October 2011, at the age of 44, Muster decided that he would play his last tennis match before retirement at the top-level Vienna tournament, where Muster lost to countryman, Dominic Thiem, in straight sets. However, three weeks after playing in Vienna, Muster was back again, this time in a Challenger tournament in Salzburg, playing against Dennis Blömke. He lost a close three-set battle. This was his last match to date.

== Records ==
In the 1995 season, Muster won 12 men's singles tournament titles, a record for the ATP Tour (since 1990). In 2006 Roger Federer tied the record.

Muster has the highest winning percentage of singles tournament finals of all players who reached a minimum of 25 finals. Of his 55 finals, he won 44 with 11 defeats (80%).

Muster holds the record for most titles in the ATP 250 tournaments (former: ATP World Series) - 26

Since the founding of the ATP Tour in 1990, Muster is the only tennis player who won the ATP titles on all six continents.

== Grand Slam and Masters Series finals ==
=== Grand Slam finals ===
==== Singles: 1 (1 title) ====
Result	Year	Championship	Surface	Opponent	Score
Win	1995	French Open	Clay	(United States) Michael Chang	7–5, 6–2, 6–4

=== Masters Series finals ===
==== Singles: 10 (8 titles / 2 runner-ups) ====
Result	Year	Tournament	Surface	Opponent	Score
Loss	1990	Monte Carlo	Clay	(Soviet Union) Andrei Chesnokov	5–7, 3–6, 3–6
Win	1990	Rome	Clay	(Soviet Union) Andrei Chesnokov	6–1, 6–3, 6–1
Win	1992	Monte Carlo	Clay	(United States) Aaron Krickstein	6–3, 6–1, 6–3
Win	1995	Monte Carlo (2)	Clay	(Germany) Boris Becker	4–6, 5–7, 6–1, 7–6^{(8–6)}, 6–0
Win	1995	Rome (2)	Clay	(Spain) Sergi Bruguera	3–6, 7–6^{(7–5)}, 6–2, 6–3
Win	1995	Essen	Carpet (i)	(United States) MaliVai Washington	7–6^{(8–6)}, 2–6, 6–3, 6–4
Win	1996	Monte Carlo (3)	Clay	(Spain) Albert Costa	6–3, 5–7, 4–6, 6–3, 6–2
Win	1996	Rome (3)	Clay	(Netherlands) Richard Krajicek	6–2, 6–4, 3–6, 6–3
Win	1997	Miami	Hard	(Spain) Sergi Bruguera	7–6^{(8–6)}, 6–3, 6–1
Loss	1997	Cincinnati	Hard	(United States) Pete Sampras	3–6, 4–6

== Career finals ==
=== Singles: 55 (44 titles / 11 runner-ups) ===
Legend Grand Slam (1–0) Tennis Masters Cup (0–0) ATP Masters Series (8–2) ATP Championship Series (4–0) ATP Tour (31–9)	Finals by surface Hard (3–3) Grass (0–0) Clay (40–5) Carpet (1–3)

Result	W-L	Date	Tournament	Surface	Opponent	Score
Win	1–0	Aug 1986	Hilversum, Netherlands	Clay	(Switzerland) Jakob Hlasek	6–1, 6–3, 6–3
Win	2–0	Jul 1988	Boston, US	Clay	(United States) Lawson Duncan	6–2, 6–2
Win	3–0	Jul 1988	Bordeaux, France	Clay	(Haiti) Ronald Agénor	6–3, 6–3
Win	4–0	Aug 1988	Prague, Czechoslovakia	Clay	(Argentina) Guillermo Pérez Roldán	6–4, 5–7, 6–2
Loss	4–1	Sep 1988	Barcelona, Spain	Clay	(Sweden) Kent Carlsson	3–6, 3–6, 6–3, 1–6
Win	5–1	Sep 1988	Bari, Italy	Clay	(Uruguay) Marcelo Filippini	2–6, 6–1, 7–5
Loss	5–2	Oct 1988	Vienna, Austria	Carpet (i)	(Austria) Horst Skoff	6–4, 3–6, 4–6, 2–6
Loss	5–3	Apr 1989	Miami, US	Hard	(Czechoslovakia) Ivan Lendl	w/o
Win	6–3	Jan 1990	Adelaide, Australia	Hard	(United States) Jimmy Arias	3–6, 6–2, 7–5
Win	7–3	Mar 1990	Casablanca, Morocco	Clay	(Argentina) Guillermo Pérez Roldán	6–1, 6–7^{(6–8)}, 6–2
Loss	7–4	Apr 1990	Monte Carlo, Monaco	Clay	(Soviet Union) Andrei Chesnokov	5–7, 3–6, 3–6
Loss	7–5	May 1990	Munich, Germany	Clay	(Czechoslovakia) Karel Nováček	4–6, 2–6
Win	8–5	May 1990	Rome, Italy	Clay	(Soviet Union) Andrei Chesnokov	6–1, 6–3, 6–1
Win	9–5	Jun 1991	Florence, Italy	Clay	(Austria) Horst Skoff	6–2, 6–7^{(2–7)}, 6–2
Win	10–5	Sep 1991	Geneva, Switzerland	Clay	(Austria) Horst Skoff	6–2, 6–4
Win	11–5	Apr 1992	Monte Carlo, Monaco	Clay	(United States) Aaron Krickstein	6–3, 6–1, 6–3
Win	12–5	Jun 1992	Florence, Italy	Clay	(Italy) Renzo Furlan	6–3, 1–6, 6–1
Win	13–5	Aug 1992	Umag, Croatia	Clay	(Argentina) Franco Davín	6–1, 4–6, 6–4
Loss	13–6	Jan 1993	Sydney, Australia	Hard	(United States) Pete Sampras	6–7^{(7–9)}, 1–6
Win	14–6	Feb 1993	Mexico City, Mexico	Clay	(Spain) Carlos Costa	6–2, 6–4
Win	15–6	Jun 1993	Florence, Italy	Clay	(Spain) Jordi Burillo	6–1, 7–5
Win	16–6	Jun 1993	Genoa, Italy	Clay	(Sweden) Magnus Gustafsson	7–6^{(7–3)}, 6–4
Win	17–6	Aug 1993	Kitzbühel, Austria	Clay	(Spain) Javier Sánchez	6–3, 7–5, 6–4
Win	18–6	Aug 1993	San Marino, San Marino	Clay	(Italy) Renzo Furlan	7–5, 7–5
Win	19–6	Aug 1993	Umag, Croatia	Clay	(Spain) Alberto Berasategui	7–5, 3–6, 6–3
Win	20–6	Oct 1993	Palermo, Italy	Clay	(Spain) Sergi Bruguera	7–6^{(7–2)}, 7–5
Loss	20–7	Oct 1993	Vienna, Austria	Carpet (i)	(Croatia) Goran Ivanišević	6–4, 4–6, 4–6, 6–7^{(3–7)}
Win	21–7	Feb 1994	Mexico City, Mexico	Clay	(Brazil) Roberto Jabali	6–3, 6–1
Win	22–7	May 1994	Madrid, Spain	Clay	(Spain) Sergi Bruguera	6–2, 3–6, 6–4, 7–5
Win	23–7	Jun 1994	Sankt Pölten, Austria	Clay	(Spain) Tomás Carbonell	4–6, 6–2, 6–4
Win	24–7	Mar 1995	Mexico City, Mexico	Clay	(Brazil) Fernando Meligeni	7–6^{(7–4)}, 7–5
Win	25–7	Apr 1995	Estoril, Portugal	Clay	(Spain) Albert Costa	6–4, 6–2
Win	26–7	Apr 1995	Barcelona, Spain	Clay	(Sweden) Magnus Larsson	6–2, 6–1, 6–4
Win	27–7	Apr 1995	Monte Carlo, Monaco	Clay	(Germany) Boris Becker	4–6, 5–7, 6–1, 7–6^{(8–6)}, 6–0
Win	28–7	May 1995	Rome, Italy	Clay	(Spain) Sergi Bruguera	3–6, 7–6^{(7–5)}, 6–2, 6–3
Win	29–7	Jun 1995	French Open	Clay	(United States) Michael Chang	7–5, 6–2, 6–4
Win	30–7	Jun 1995	Sankt Pölten, Austria	Clay	(Czech Republic) Bohdan Ulihrach	6–3, 3–6, 6–1
Win	31–7	Jul 1995	Stuttgart, Germany	Clay	(Sweden) Jan Apell	6–2, 6–2
Loss	31–8	Aug 1995	Kitzbühel, Austria	Clay	(Spain) Albert Costa	6–4, 4–6, 6–7^{(3–7)}, 6–2, 4–6
Win	32–8	Aug 1995	San Marino, San Marino	Clay	(Italy) Andrea Gaudenzi	6–2, 6–0
Win	33–8	Aug 1995	Umag, Croatia	Clay	(Spain) Carlos Costa	3–6, 7–6^{(7–5)}, 6–4
Win	34–8	Sep 1995	Bucharest, Romania	Clay	(Austria) Gilbert Schaller	6–3, 6–4
Loss	34–9	Oct 1995	Vienna, Austria	Carpet (i)	(Belgium) Filip Dewulf	5–7, 2–6, 6–1, 5–7
Win	35–9	Oct 1995	Essen, Germany	Carpet (i)	(United States) MaliVai Washington	7–6^{(8–6)}, 2–6, 6–3, 6–4
Win	36–9	Mar 1996	Mexico City, Mexico	Clay	(Czech Republic) Jiří Novák	7–6^{(7–3)}, 6–2
Win	37–9	Apr 1996	Estoril, Portugal	Clay	(Italy) Andrea Gaudenzi	7–6^{(7–4)}, 6–4
Win	38–9	Apr 1996	Barcelona, Spain	Clay	(Chile) Marcelo Ríos	6–3, 4–6, 6–4, 6–1
Win	39–9	Apr 1996	Monte Carlo, Monaco	Clay	(Spain) Albert Costa	6–3, 5–7, 4–6, 6–3, 6–2
Win	40–9	May 1996	Rome, Italy	Clay	(Netherlands) Richard Krajicek	6–2, 6–4, 3–6, 6–3
Win	41–9	Jul 1996	Stuttgart, Germany	Clay	(Russia) Yevgeny Kafelnikov	6–2, 6–2, 6–4
Win	42–9	Sep 1996	Bogotá, Colombia	Clay	(Ecuador) Nicolás Lapentti	6–7^{(6–8)}, 6–2, 6–3
Win	43–9	Feb 1997	Dubai, UAE	Hard	(Croatia) Goran Ivanišević	7–5, 7–6^{(7–3)}
Win	44–9	Mar 1997	Miami, US	Hard	(Spain) Sergi Bruguera	7–6^{(8–6)}, 6–3, 6–1
Loss	44–10	Aug 1997	Cincinnati, US	Hard	(United States) Pete Sampras	3–6, 4–6
Loss	44–11	Apr 1998	Estoril, Portugal	Clay	(Spain) Alberto Berasategui	6–3, 1–6, 3–6

=== Doubles: 2 (1 title / 1 runner-up) ===
Legend Grand Slam (0–0) Tennis Masters Cup (0–0) ATP Masters Series (0–0) ATP Championship Series (0–0) ATP Tour (1–1)	Finals by surface Hard (0–0) Grass (0–0) Clay (1–1) Carpet (0–0)

Result	W-L	Date	Tournament	Surface	Partner	Opponents	Score
Loss	0–1	Aug 1988	Prague, Czechoslovakia	Clay	(Austria) Horst Skoff	(Czechoslovakia) Petr Korda (Czechoslovakia) Jaroslav Navrátil	5–7, 6–7
Win	1–1	Sep 1988	Bari, Italy	Clay	(Italy) Claudio Panatta	(Italy) Francesco Cancellotti (Italy) Simone Colombo	6–3, 6–1

== Singles performance timeline ==
Key
W	F	SF	QF	#R	RR	Q#	P#	DNQ	A	Z#	PO	G	S	B	NMS	NTI	P	NH

(W) winner; (F) finalist; (SF) semifinalist; (QF) quarterfinalist; (#R) rounds 4, 3, 2, 1; (RR) round-robin stage; (Q#) qualification round; (P#) preliminary round; (DNQ) did not qualify; (A) absent; (Z#) Davis/Fed Cup Zonal Group (with number indication) or (PO) play-off; (G) gold, (S) silver or (B) bronze Olympic/Paralympic medal; (NMS) not a Masters tournament; (NTI) not a Tier I tournament; (P) postponed; (NH) not held; (SR) strike rate (events won / competed); (W–L) win–loss record.

Tournament	1984	1985	1986	1987	1988	1989	1990	1991	1992	1993	1994	1995	1996	1997	1998	1999	...	2010	2011	SR	W–L
Grand Slam tournaments
Australian Open	A	A	NH	A	1R	SF	3R	A	3R	2R	QF	3R	4R	SF	1R	1R		A	A	0 / 11	23–11
French Open	A	1R	2R	3R	3R	A	SF	1R	2R	4R	3R	W	4R	3R	QF	1R		A	A	1 / 14	32–13
Wimbledon	A	A	A	1R	A	A	A	A	1R	1R	1R	A	A	A	A	A		A	A	0 / 4	0–4
US Open	A	A	1R	3R	1R	A	4R	A	A	QF	QF	4R	QF	1R	3R	A		A	A	0 / 10	22–10
Win–loss	0–0	0–1	1–2	4–3	2–3	4–1	10–3	0–1	3–3	8–4	10–4	12–2	10–3	7–3	6–3	0–2		0–0	0–0	1 / 39	77–38
Year-end championships
ATP Finals	A	A	A	A	A	A	RR	A	A	A	A	RR	RR	RR	A	A		A	A	0 / 4	2–8
Grand Slam Cup	not held						1R	A	A	1R	1R	1R	A	1R	A	A		not held		0 / 5	0–5
Grand Prix							ATP Masters series														
Indian Wells	A	A	A	A	A	2R	A	2R	A	3R	QF	QF	2R	SF	SF	1R		A	A	0 / 9	14–9
Miami	NH	A	A	3R	3R	F	A	A	A	3R	A	A	2R	W	A	A		A	A	1 / 6	18–4
Monte Carlo	A	A	2R	3R	1R	A	F	1R	W	SF	QF	W	W	2R	1R	2R		A	A	3 / 13	32–10
Hamburg	A	A	QF	1R	1R	A	A	1R	2R	3R	3R	A	A	3R	QF	A		A	A	0 / 9	11–9
Rome	A	A	A	1R	3R	A	W	3R	1R	2R	3R	W	W	2R	3R	1R		A	A	3 / 12	28–9
Canada	A	A	A	A	A	A	A	A	A	A	A	A	2R	3R	A	A		A	A	0 / 2	1–2
Cincinnati	A	A	A	A	A	A	A	A	A	A	1R	A	SF	F	2R	A		A	A	0 / 4	8–4
Stuttgart^{1}	A	A	A	A	3R	3R	A	A	3R	A	2R	W	2R	1R	A	A		A	A	1 / 7	8–6
Paris	not held		A	A	2R	1R	A	A	1R	A	2R	2R	2R	QF	A	A		A	A	0 / 7	3–7
Win–loss	0–0	0–0	4–2	4–4	6–6	7–3	11–1	2–4	8–4	9–5	9–7	20–2	14–6	18–8	10–5	1–3		0–0	0–0	8 / 69	123–60
National representation
Olympic Games	not held				A	not held			1R	not held			A	not held						0 / 1	0–1
Davis Cup	Z1	Z1	Z1	Z1	Z1	QF	SF	PO	A	A	1R	QF	1R	PO	A	A		A	A	0 / 5	36–8
Career statistics
Titles	0	0	1	0	4	0	3	2	3	7	3	12	7	2	0	0		0	0	44	
Finals	0	0	1	0	6	1	5	2	3	9	3	14	7	3	1	0		0	0	55	
Hard win–loss	0–0	0–0	0–4	6–4	3–5	11–4	10–2	2–3	7–5	18–7	18–10	11–6	14–8	29–8	11–7	4–5		0–1	0–1	144–80	
Clay win–loss	2–1	11–7	21–10	17–10	43–9	4–2	37–11	28–13	30–13	55–10	37–9	65–2	46–3	9–9	20–11	1–6		0–0	0–1	426–127	
Grass win–loss	0–0	0–0	0–0	0–1	0–0	0–0	0–0	0–1	0–1	0–1	0–1	0–0	5–2	2–2	0–1	0–0		0–0	0–0	7–10	
Carpet win–loss	1–1	1–1	1–4	3–3	5–2	4–3	4–5	0–2	2–4	4–3	3–5	10–10	3–7	6–5	1–1	0–0		0–0	0–0	48–56	
Overall win–loss	3–2	12–8	22–18	26–18	51–16	19–9	51–18	30–19	39–23	77–21	58–25	86–18	68–20	46–24	32–20	5–11		0–1	0–2	625–273	
Win %	67%	60%	55%	59%	76%	68%	74%	61%	63%	79%	70%	83%	77%	66%	62%	31%		0%	0%	70%	
Year-end ranking	311	98	47	56	16	21	7	35	18	9	16	3	5	9	25	189		980	1075		

Note: Muster played no professional matches between 2000 and 2009.

^{1} Held as Stockholm Masters until 1994, Essen in 1995 and Stuttgart indoor from 1996 onwards.

== Top 10 wins ==
Season	1984	1985	1986	1987	1988	1989	1990	1991	1992	1993	1994	1995	1996	1997	1998	1999	2010	2011	Total
Wins	0	0	1	0	2	0	3	1	2	1	3	12	5	3	3	1	0	0	37

#	Player	Rank	Event	Surface	Rd	Score
1986
1.	(Sweden) Joakim Nyström	9	Barcelona, Spain	Clay	1R	6–2, 7–5
1988
2.	(United States) Andre Agassi	6	Boston, United States	Clay	QF	6–1, 6–4
3.	(Czechoslovakia) Miloslav Mečíř	5	Stuttgart, Germany	Clay	3R	6–4, 7–6
1990
4.	(Ecuador) Andrés Gómez	7	Rome, Italy	Clay	SF	5–7, 6–4, 7–6
5.	(United States) Andre Agassi	4	Davis Cup, Vienna	Clay	RR	6–2, 6–2, 7–6^{(7–2)}
6.	(Ecuador) Andrés Gómez	6	ATP Tour World Championships, Frankfurt	Carpet (i)	RR	7–5, 5–7, 6–4
1991
7.	(Spain) Sergi Bruguera	9	Geneva, Switzerland	Clay	QF	4–6, 6–4, 6–4
1992
8.	(France) Guy Forget	7	Monte-Carlo, Monaco	Clay	3R	7–6^{(7–3)}, 4–6, 6–3
9.	(Germany) Michael Stich	8	Stuttgart, Germany	Clay	3R	7–6^{(7–2)}, 6–4
1993
10.	(Spain) Sergi Bruguera	4	Palermo, Italy	Clay	F	7–6^{(7–2)}, 7–5
1994
11.	(Germany) Michael Stich	2	Davis Cup, Graz	Clay (i)	RR	6–4, 6–7^{(8–10)}, 4–6, 6–3, 12–10
12.	(Spain) Sergi Bruguera	6	Madrid, Spain	Clay	F	6–2, 3–6, 6–4, 7–5
13.	(Spain) Sergi Bruguera	3	US Open, New York	Hard	4R	6–4, 7–6^{(7–4)}, 6–4
1995
14.	(Spain) Sergi Bruguera	4	Davis Cup, Vienna	Hard (i)	RR	6–4, 7–5, 6–3
15.	(United States) Michael Chang	4	Indian Wells, United States	Hard	3R	6–1, 5–7, 7–6^{(7–3)}
16.	(Russia) Yevgeny Kafelnikov	5	Barcelona, Spain	Clay	SF	6–3, 6–3
17.	(Spain) Alberto Berasategui	8	Monte-Carlo, Monaco	Clay	3R	7–6^{(8–6)}, 6–2
18.	(Germany) Boris Becker	3	Monte-Carlo, Monaco	Clay	F	4–6, 5–7, 6–1, 7–6^{(8–6)}, 6–0
19.	(United States) Michael Chang	5	Rome, Italy	Clay	QF	6–3, 6–2
20.	(South Africa) Wayne Ferreira	6	Rome, Italy	Clay	SF	3–6, 6–1, 6–3
21.	(Spain) Sergi Bruguera	7	Rome, Italy	Clay	F	3–6, 7–6^{(7–5)}, 6–2, 6–3
22.	(Russia) Yevgeny Kafelnikov	9	French Open, Paris	Clay	SF	6–4, 6–0, 6–4
23.	(United States) Michael Chang	6	French Open, Paris	Clay	F	7–5, 6–2, 6–4
24.	(Spain) Sergi Bruguera	10	Essen, Germany	Carpet (i)	QF	6–4, 7–6^{(7–3)}
25.	(United States) Pete Sampras	2	Essen, Germany	Carpet (i)	SF	7–6^{(8–6)}, 6–2
1996
26.	(South Africa) Wayne Ferreira	10	Davis Cup, Johannesburg	Grass	RR	7–5, 6–7^{(5–7)}, 6–4, 7–6^{(7–4)}
27.	(Chile) Marcelo Ríos	10	Rome, Italy	Clay	QF	6–3, 6–2
28.	(Russia) Yevgeny Kafelnikov	6	Stuttgart, Germany	Clay	F	6–2, 6–2, 6–4
29.	(South Africa) Wayne Ferreira	10	Cincinnati, United States	Hard	QF	7–6^{(7–4)}, 7–6^{(16–14)}
30.	(United States) Michael Chang	2	ATP Tour World Championships, Hanover	Carpet (i)	RR	6–4, 6–3
1997
31.	(Croatia) Goran Ivanišević	4	Australian Open, Melbourne	Hard	QF	6–4, 6–2, 6–3
32.	(Croatia) Goran Ivanišević	2	Dubai, United Arab Emirates	Hard	F	7–5, 7–6^{(7–3)}
33.	(United States) Michael Chang	2	Cincinnati, United States	Hard	SF	6–3, 4–6, 7–6^{(7–2)}
1998
34.	(United States) Pete Sampras	1	Indian Wells, United States	Hard	3R	7–5, 6–3
35.	(Russia) Yevgeny Kafelnikov	6	Hamburg, Germany	Clay	2R	6–4, 6–2
36.	(Sweden) Jonas Björkman	7	French Open, Paris	Clay	1R	6–3, 6–3, 6–3
1999
37.	(Spain) Carlos Moyá	5	Sydney, Australia	Hard	2R	7–6^{(7–4)}, 7–5

== Record against No. 1 players ==
Muster's match record against players who have been ranked world No. 1.

Player	Years	Matches	Record	Win %	Hard	Clay	Grass	Carpet
(Russia) Yevgeny Kafelnikov	1994–1998	5	4–1	80%	0–0	4–1	0–0	0–0
(Chile) Marcelo Ríos	1995–1998	4	3–1	75%	0–0	3–1	0–0	0–0
(Spain) Carlos Moyá	1996–1999	8	4–4	50%	1–2	3–2	0–0	0–0
(United States) Andre Agassi	1987–1996	9	4–5	44%	1–3	3–1	0–0	0–1
(United States) Jim Courier	1988–1997	12	5–7	42%	3–3	2–3	0–0	0–1
(Germany) Boris Becker	1988–1995	3	1–2	33%	0–0	1–1	0–0	0–1
(Czech Republic) / (United States) Ivan Lendl	1987–1994	5	1–4	20%	0–2	1–1	0–0	0–1
(United States) Pete Sampras	1990–1998	11	2–9	18%	1–5	0–1	0–0	1–3
(Russia) Marat Safin	1998	1	0–1	0%	0–1	0–0	0–0	0–0
(Sweden) Mats Wilander	1986–1989	2	0–2	0%	0–0	0–1	0–0	0–1
(Brazil) Gustavo Kuerten	1997–1999	3	0–3	0%	0–1	0–2	0–0	0–0
(Australia) Patrick Rafter	1994–1997	3	0–3	0%	0–0	0–2	0–0	0–1
(Sweden) Stefan Edberg	1986–1996	10	0–10	0%	0–2	0–4	0–1	0–3

== Personal life ==
Thomas Muster was married to Jo Beth Taylor, an Australian television personality, from 2000 to 2005, having separated in 2002. They have a son, Christian, who was born in 2001. In 2010, Muster married Caroline Ofner and they have a daughter, Maxim, born in 2009. The family divides time between Styria and Croatia.

Sporting positions
Preceded by Andre Agassi; Pete Sampras	World No. 1; 12–18 February 1996; 11 March 1996 – 14 April 1996	Succeeded by Pete Sampras; Pete Sampras
