= László Markovits =

Hungarian tennis player

- Country (sports): Hungary
- Born: 4 April 1970 (age 56)
- Height: 1.80 m (5 ft 11 in)
- Turned pro: 1995
- Plays: Right-handed
- Prize money: US$67,898

Singles
- Career record: 12–16
- Career titles: 0
- Highest ranking: No. 604 (19 October 1987)

Doubles
- Career record: 107–93

Grand Slam doubles results
- French Open: 1R (1996)
- Wimbledon: 1R (1996)

László Markovits (born 4 April 1970) is a former tennis player from Hungary, son of water polo player and national team captain Kálmán Markovits and World champion handballer Márta Balogh. He was the winner of Hungarian National Tennis Championships in singles in 1986 (the youngest winner in seniors category in Hungarian tennis history with his age of 16) and has won it two times. He represented his native country as a lucky loser at the 1992 Barcelona Olympics in singles and partnered with Sándor Noszály for the doubles, but both ended in the first round, losing in four sets and being forced to retire respectively. He reached the second round in the 1988 Seoul Olympics and 1996 Atlanta Olympics teamed up with Gábor Köves.

In the 1991 Davis Cup Euro/African Group I 1st Round Play-offs he defended Hungary to be relegated to Group II by winning the second and third match (singles and doubles) against Morocco resulting in the irreversible 3–0 lead (5–0 in total). He was a member as a reserve of the 1993 team, whose victory over Argentina resulted in advancing to the World Group and an active member of the 1995 team who shocked Australia by knocking them out in the World Group play-offs. He was a recurring member of the team over a decade (1987–97) clinching a 9–8 win–loss record in doubles but being less successful in singles (1–7 in overall). He has later become the chairman of Vasas SC.

== Career finals ==
=== Doubles (4 titles – 5 runners-up) ===
Legend (singles)
Grand Slam (0)
Tennis Masters Cup (0)
ATP Masters Series (0)
ATP International Series Gold /
ATP World Tour 500 Series (0)
ATP Tour (0)
Challengers (4)

Result	No.	Date	Tournament	Surface	Partner	Opponents	Score
Loss	1.	22 May 1994	Budapest I	Clay	(Hungary) Gábor Köves	(Portugal) João Cunha e Silva (Portugal) Nuno Marques	7–6, 4–6, 6–7
Loss	2.	26 June 1994	Braunschweig	Clay	(Hungary) Gábor Köves	(Argentina) Horacio de la Peña (Spain) Javier Sánchez	4–6, 6–7
Win	3.	11 June 1995	Medellín	Clay	(Zimbabwe) Wayne Black	(India) Leander Paes (Venezuela) Maurice Ruah	7–5, 6–4
Loss	4.	27 August 1995	Umag	Clay	(Sweden) David Ekerot	(Argentina) Luis Lobo (Spain) Javier Sánchez	4–6, 0–6
Win	5.	5 November 1995	Aachen	Carpet	(Sweden) David Ekerot	(West Germany) Alexander Mronz (Germany) Lars Rehmann	6–7, 6–4, 7–6
Win	6.	25 August 1996	Graz	Clay	(Argentina) Pablo Albano	(Italy) Filippo Messori (Italy) Cristian Brandi	6–4, 6–1
Win	7.	15 September 1996	Budapest II	Clay	(Hungary) Attila Sávolt	(Finland) Tuomas Ketola (Slovenia) Borut Urh	Walkover
Loss	8.	17 September 1996	Budapest II	Clay	(Hungary) Gábor Köves	(Portugal) Emanuel Couto (Portugal) João Cunha e Silva	6–4, 5–7, 4–6
Loss	9.	3 August 1997	Poznań	Clay	(Spain) Jordi Burillo	(Czech Republic) David Rikl (Czech Republic) Tomáš Anzari	3–6, 2–6
