= Emanuel Rasberger =

Croatian tennis player (born 1972)

- Country (sports): Croatia
- Born: 3 June 1972 (age 53)
- Prize money: $29,540

Singles
- Career record: 0–6
- Highest ranking: No. 543 (10 July 1995)

Doubles
- Career record: 1–7
- Highest ranking: No. 389 (24 April 1995)

Emanuel Rasberger (born 3 June 1972) is a Croatian former professional tennis player.

Rasberger, who had a best singles ranking of 543 in the world, competed as a wildcard in six editions of the Croatia Open, held in his home town of Umag. He is a nephew of tournament director Slavko Rasberger.
