= Francisco Roig =

Spanish tennis player and coach

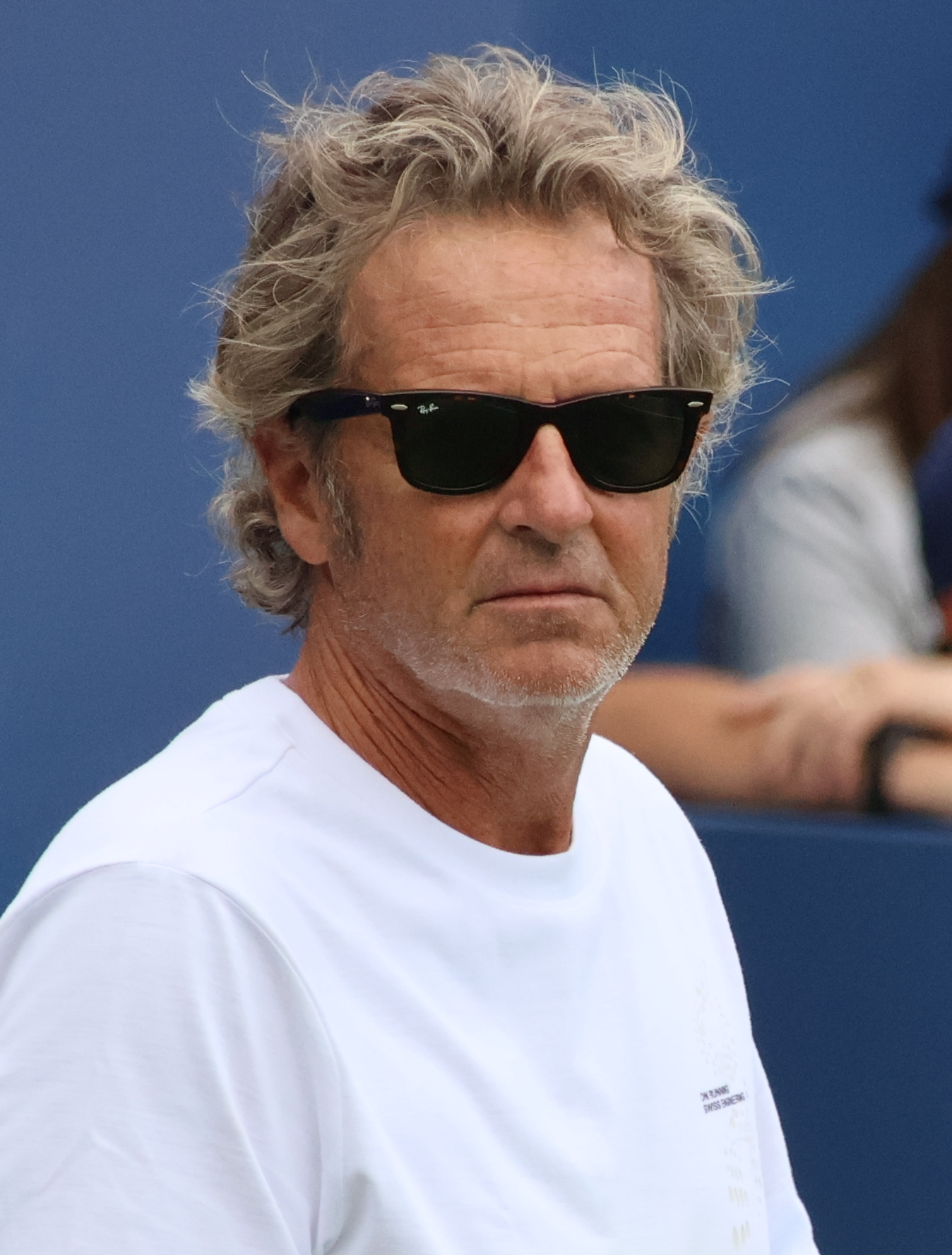
- Roig in 2026
- Country (sports): Spain
- Residence: Barcelona, Spain
- Born: 1 April 1968 (age 58) Barcelona, Spain
- Height: 1.75 m (5 ft 9 in)
- Turned pro: 1987
- Retired: 2001 (last match 2014)
- Plays: Right-handed (two-handed backhand)
- Coach: Rafael Nadal (2005-2022, alternate) Matteo Berrettini (2023-2024) Emma Raducanu (2025-2026) Giovanni Mpetshi Perricard (2026) Iga Świątek (2026-present)
- Prize money: US$1,466,830

Singles
- Career record: 64–96
- Career titles: 0
- Highest ranking: No. 60 (5 October 1992)

Grand Slam singles results
- Australian Open: 1R (1990, 1993)
- French Open: 3R (1989)
- Wimbledon: 2R (1992)
- US Open: 2R (1992)

Doubles
- Career record: 197–173
- Career titles: 9
- Highest ranking: No. 23 (31 July 1995)

Grand Slam doubles results
- Australian Open: 1R (1990, 1993, 1999, 2000)
- French Open: QF (1997)
- Wimbledon: 2R (1996)
- US Open: 2R (1994, 1996, 1998)

Francisco "Francis" Roig Genís (born 1 April 1968) is a Spanish tennis coach and retired professional tennis player. He was primarily a doubles player, winning nine ATP World Tour titles and reaching 12 more finals. After his playing retirement, he acted as the alternate coach of fellow Spaniard Rafael Nadal from 2005 until 2022. He was the coach of Matteo Berrettini from December 2023 until October 2024. From August 2025 to January 2026 he coached former US Open champion Emma Raducanu. In March 2026, Roig started coaching ATP tennis player Giovanni Mpetshi Perricard, but subsequently ended that partnership without informing Mpetshi Perricard to begin coaching WTA star Iga Świątek from April onward.

== ATP Tour finals ==
=== Doubles (9 titles, 12 runner-ups) ===
Legend
Grand Slam (0)
Tennis Masters Cup (0)
ATP Masters Series (0)
ATP Championship Series (1)
ATP Tour (8)

Result	W-L	Date	Tournament	Surface	Partner	Opponents	Score
Win	1–0	Aug 1991	Kitzbühel, Austria	Clay	(Spain) Tomás Carbonell	(Peru) Pablo Arraya (Soviet Union) Dimitri Poliakov	6–7, 6–2, 6–4
Loss	1–1	Feb 1992	Guarujá, Brazil	Clay	(Uruguay) Diego Pérez	(Sweden) Christer Allgårdh (Australia) Carl Limberger	4–6, 3–6
Win	2–1	Oct 1992	Athens, Greece	Clay	(Spain) Tomás Carbonell	(Uruguay) Marcelo Filippini (Netherlands) Mark Koevermans	6–3, 6–4
Win	3–1	Nov 1992	São Paulo, Brazil	Clay	(Uruguay) Diego Pérez	(Sweden) Christer Allgårdh (Australia) Carl Limberger	6–2, 7–6
Loss	3–2	Aug 1993	Umag, Croatia	Clay	(Spain) Jordi Arrese	(Belgium) Filip Dewulf (Belgium) Tom Vanhoudt	4–6, 5–7
Win	4–2	Aug 1994	Umag, Croatia	Clay	(Uruguay) Diego Pérez	(Slovakia) Karol Kučera (Kenya) Paul Wekesa	6–2, 6–4
Loss	4–3	Oct 1994	Santiago, Chile	Clay	(Spain) Tomás Carbonell	(Czech Republic) Karel Nováček (Sweden) Mats Wilander	6–4, 6–7, 6–7
Loss	4–4	Nov 1994	Buenos Aires, Argentina	Clay	(Spain) Tomás Carbonell	(Spain) Sergio Casal (Spain) Emilio Sánchez	3–6, 2–6
Loss	4–5	Feb 1995	Dubai, United Arab Emirates	Hard	(Spain) Tomás Carbonell	(Canada) Grant Connell (United States) Patrick Galbraith	2–6, 6–4, 3–6
Loss	4–6	Mar 1995	Rotterdam, Netherlands	Carpet (i)	(Spain) Tomás Carbonell	(Czech Republic) Martin Damm (Sweden) Anders Järryd	3–6, 2–6
Win	5–6	Mar 1995	Casablanca, Morocco	Clay	(Spain) Tomás Carbonell	(Portugal) Emanuel Couto (Portugal) João Cunha e Silva	6–4, 6–1
Win	6–6	Jun 1995	Oporto, Portugal	Clay	(Spain) Tomás Carbonell	(Spain) Jordi Arrese (Spain) Àlex Corretja	6–3, 7–6
Win	7–6	Jul 1995	Stuttgart Outdoor, Germany	Clay	(Spain) Tomás Carbonell	(South Africa) Ellis Ferreira (Netherlands) Jan Siemerink	3–6, 6–3, 6–4
Win	8–6	Oct 1995	Valencia, Spain	Clay	(Spain) Tomás Carbonell	(Netherlands) Tom Kempers (United States) Jack Waite	7–5, 6–3
Loss	8–7	Mar 1996	Casablanca, Morocco	Clay	(Spain) Tomás Carbonell	(Czech Republic) Jiří Novák (Czech Republic) David Rikl	6–7, 3–6
Win	9–7	Apr 1996	Estoril, Portugal	Clay	(Spain) Tomás Carbonell	(Netherlands) Tom Nijssen (United States) Greg Van Emburgh	6–3, 6–2
Loss	9–8	Jul 1996	Stuttgart, Germany	Clay	(Spain) Tomás Carbonell	(Czech Republic) Libor Pimek (South Africa) Byron Talbot	2–6, 7–5, 4–6
Loss	9–9	Feb 1998	Antwerp, Belgium	Hard	(Spain) Tomás Carbonell	(South Africa) Wayne Ferreira (Russia) Yevgeny Kafelnikov	5–7, 6–3, 2–6
Loss	9–10	Oct 1998	Lyon, France	Carpet (i)	(Spain) Tomás Carbonell	(France) Olivier Delaître (France) Fabrice Santoro	2–6, 2–6
Loss	9–11	Sep 1999	Mallorca, Spain	Clay	(Spain) Alberto Berasategui	(Argentina) Lucas Arnold Ker (Spain) Tomas Carbonell	1–6, 4–6
Loss	9–12	May 2001	Majorca Open, Spain	Clay	(Spain) Feliciano López	(United States) Donald Johnson (United States) Jared Palmer	5–7, 3–6

== Top 10 wins ==
- Roig has a 1–7 (.125) record against players who were, at the time the match was played, ranked in the top 10.

#	Player	Rank	Event	Surface	Rd	Score
1990
1.	(Spain) Emilio Sánchez	8	Athens, Greece	Clay	1R	6–2, 7–6
