= Filip Dewulf =

Belgian tennis player

- Country (sports): Belgium
- Residence: Leopoldsburg, Belgium
- Born: 15 March 1972 (age 53); Mol, Belgium
- Height: 1.93 m (6 ft 4 in)
- Turned pro: 1990
- Retired: 2001
- Plays: Right-handed (two-handed backhand)
- Prize money: $1,503,987

Singles
- Career record: 96–125
- Career titles: 2
- Highest ranking: No. 39 (15 September 1997)

Grand Slam singles results
- Australian Open: 2R (1994, 1996, 1997)
- French Open: SF (1997)
- Wimbledon: 2R (1996, 1998)
- US Open: 1R (1996, 1997, 1998)

Other tournaments
- Grand Slam Cup: 1R (1997)

Doubles
- Career record: 12–41
- Career titles: 1
- Highest ranking: No. 125 (4 October 1993)
- Last updated on: 3 April 2022.

Filip Dewulf (born 15 March 1972) is a former professional male tennis player from Belgium.

In his career, he won two ATP Tour singles titles and one title in doubles. In 1997 he reached the semifinals of the French Open, his best singles result ever and the first Belgian tennis player (male or female) to reach the semi-final at a Grand Slam tournament. He defeated Cristiano Caratti, Fernando Meligeni, Albert Portas, Àlex Corretja and Magnus Norman before he was defeated in four sets by the eventual champion, Gustavo Kuerten. This was, according to Roland Garros itself, the best performance that a qualifier has performed at a French Open, and only the third time in Grand Slam history that a qualifier had reached a semi-final. Dewulf would also reach the quarter-finals at the same event the following year, falling to eventual runner-up Àlex Corretja in straight sets. His career-high singles ranking was world No. 39, achieved in September 1997; he became the first Belgian in ATP Top 50, overall finishing four seasons as the top-ranked Belgian player.

== ATP career finals ==
=== Singles: 2 (2 titles) ===
Legend Grand Slam Tournaments (0–0) ATP World Tour Finals (0–0) ATP Masters Series (0–0) ATP Championship Series (0–0) ATP World Series (2–0)	Finals by surface Hard (0–0) Clay (1–0) Grass (0–0) Carpet (1–0)	Finals by setting Outdoors (1–0) Indoors (1–0)

Result	W–L	Date	Tournament	Tier	Surface	Opponent	Score
Win	1–0	Oct 1995	Vienna, Austria	World Series	Carpet	(Austria) Thomas Muster	7–5, 6–2, 1–6, 7–5
Win	2–0	Jul 1997	Kitzbühel, Austria	World Series	Clay	(Spain) Julian Alonso	7–6^{(7–2)}, 6–4, 6–1

=== Doubles: 1 (1 title) ===
Legend Grand Slam Tournaments (0–0) ATP World Tour Finals (0–0) ATP Masters Series (0–0) ATP Championship Series (0–0) ATP World Series (1–0)	Finals by surface Hard (0–0) Clay (1–0) Grass (0–0) Carpet (0–0)	Finals by setting Outdoors (1–0) Indoors (0–0)

Result	W–L	Date	Tournament	Tier	Surface	Partner	Opponents	Score
Win	1–0	Aug 1993	Umag, Croatia	World Series	Clay	(Belgium) Tom Vanhoudt	(Spain) Jordi Arrese (Spain) Francisco Roig	6–4, 7–5

== ATP Challenger and ITF Futures finals ==
=== Singles: 6 (1–5) ===
Legend ATP Challenger (0–5) ITF Futures (1–0)	Finals by surface Hard (0–1) Clay (1–4) Grass (0–0) Carpet (0–0)

Result	W–L	Date	Tournament	Tier	Surface	Opponent	Score
Loss	0-1	Aug 1992	Geneva, Switzerland	Challenger	Clay	(Chile) Sergio Cortés	7–6, 2–6, 4–6
Loss	0-2	May 1994	Jerusalem, Israel	Challenger	Hard	(Germany) Arne Thoms	6–4, 1–6, 4–6
Loss	0-3	Jun 1994	Tashkent, Uzbekistan	Challenger	Clay	(United States) Chuck Adams	4–6, 6–4, 6–7
Win	1-3	Jan 2000	France F1, Grasse	Futures	Clay	(France) Nicolas Coutelot	6–2, 6–2
Loss	1-4	May 2000	Edinburgh, United Kingdom	Challenger	Clay	(Argentina) Marcelo Charpentier	walkover
Loss	1-5	Jun 2000	Weiden, Germany	Challenger	Clay	(Germany) Daniel Elsner	1–6, 6–7^{(5–7>}

=== Doubles: 10 (6–4) ===
Legend ATP Challenger (6–4) ITF Futures (0–0)	Finals by surface Hard (0–2) Clay (5–1) Grass (0–0) Carpet (1–1)

Result	W–L	Date	Tournament	Tier	Surface	Partner	Opponents	Score
Loss	0–1	Jul 1992	Oberstaufen, Germany	Challenger	Clay	(Belgium) Tom Vanhoudt	(Australia) Johan Anderson (Sweden) Lars-Anders Wahlgren	6–2, 6–7, 4–6
Win	1–1	Aug 1992	Geneva, Switzerland	Challenger	Clay	(Belgium) Tom Vanhoudt	(Venezuela) Alfonso Gonzalez-Mora (Chile) Marcelo Rebolledo	6–3, 6–2
Win	2–1	Sep 1992	Casablanca, Morocco	Challenger	Clay	(Belgium) Tom Vanhoudt	(Slovakia) Karol Kučera (Russia) Andrey Merinov	7–5, 6–3
Loss	2–2	Nov 1992	Bandar Seri Begawan, Brunei	Challenger	Hard	(Belgium) Tom Vanhoudt	(Republic of Ireland) Owen Casey (United States) Donald Johnson	2–6, 3–6
Win	3–2	Feb 1993	Lippstadt, Germany	Challenger	Carpet	(Canada) Martin Laurendeau	(Sweden) David Engel (Sweden) Peter Nyborg	7–6, 4–6, 7–6
Loss	3–3	Mar 1993	Garmisch, Germany	Challenger	Carpet	(Belgium) Tom Vanhoudt	(United States) Mike Bauer (Germany) Alexander Mronz	6–7, 6–3, 2–6
Win	4–3	Aug 1993	Graz, Austria	Challenger	Clay	(Belgium) Tom Vanhoudt	(Spain) Jordi Arrese (Spain) Francisco Roig	6–7, 6–2, 6–3
Win	5–3	Sep 1993	Budapest, Hungary	Challenger	Clay	(Belgium) Tom Vanhoudt	(Italy) Stefano Pescosolido (Italy) Massimo Valeri	7–5, 6–3
Loss	5–4	May 1994	Jerusalem, Israel	Challenger	Hard	(Belgium) Dick Norman	(South Africa) Ellis Ferreira (South Africa) Kevin Ullyett	6–7, 3–6
Win	6–4	Jul 1995	Prague, Czech Republic	Challenger	Clay	(Czech Republic) Vojtěch Flégl	(Czech Republic) Petr Pála (Czech Republic) David Škoch	6–7, 7–5, 6–2

== Performance timeline ==
Key
W	F	SF	QF	#R	RR	Q#	DNQ	A	NH

(W) winner; (F) finalist; (SF) semifinalist; (QF) quarterfinalist; (#R) rounds 4, 3, 2, 1; (RR) round-robin stage; (Q#) qualification round; (DNQ) did not qualify; (A) absent; (NH) not held; (SR) strike rate (events won / competed); (W–L) win–loss record.

=== Singles ===
Tournament	1993	1994	1995	1996	1997	1998	1999	2000	SR	W–L	Win %
Grand Slam tournaments
Australian Open	A	2R	1R	2R	2R	1R	A	A	0 / 5	3–5	38%
French Open	Q3	A	Q3	1R	SF	QF	A	Q2	0 / 3	9–3	75%
Wimbledon	A	A	1R	2R	1R	2R	A	A	0 / 4	2–4	33%
US Open	A	A	A	1R	1R	1R	A	A	0 / 3	0–3	0%
Win–loss	0–0	1–1	0–2	2–4	6–4	5–4	0–0	0–0	0 / 15	14–15	48%
ATP Tour Masters 1000
Miami	A	A	A	A	2R	2R	A	A	0 / 2	2–2	50%
Monte Carlo	A	Q3	A	1R	A	A	A	A	0 / 1	0–1	0%
Hamburg	A	A	A	A	1R	2R	A	A	0 / 2	1–2	33%
Rome	A	A	A	A	A	2R	A	A	0 / 1	1–1	50%
Canada	A	A	A	1R	A	A	A	A	0 / 1	0–1	0%
Cincinnati	A	A	A	1R	A	A	A	A	0 / 1	0–1	0%
Paris	A	A	A	Q1	1R	A	A	A	0 / 1	0–1	0%
Stuttgart	A	A	A	1R	1R	A	A	A	0 / 2	0–2	0%
Win–loss	0–0	0–0	0–0	0–4	1–4	3–3	0–0	0–0	0 / 11	4–11	27%
