= 2000 Croatia Open – Doubles =

Doubles
- 2000 Croatia Open
- 1999 Champions: (Argentina) Mariano Puerta (Spain) Javier Sánchez

Final
- Champions: (Spain) Álex López Morón (Spain) Albert Portas
- Runners-up: (Croatia) Ivan Ljubičić (Croatia) Lovro Zovko
- Score: 6–1, 3–6, 6–3

Details
- Draw: 16
- Seeds: 4

Events
Singles	Doubles
← 1999 ·	Croatia Open	· 2001 →

Mariano Puerta and Javier Sánchez were the defending champions, but Sánchez did not compete this year, as he played his last professional tournament at Bogotá before his retirement during this season. Puerta teamed up with Marcelo Ríos and withdrew before their semifinals match to focus on the singles tournament, as both players reached the final.

Álex López Morón and Albert Portas won the title by defeating Ivan Ljubičić and Lovro Zovko 6–1, 3–6, 6–3 in the final.

== Seeds ==
1. (Italy) Cristian Brandi / (Italy) Massimo Bertolini (quarterfinals)
2. (Czech Republic) Petr Pála / (Czech Republic) Pavel Vízner (quarterfinals)
3. (Spain) Alberto Martín / (Brazil) Antonio Prieto (quarterfinals)
4. (Argentina) Pablo Albano / (Argentina) Sebastián Prieto (first round)

== Draw ==
=== Key ===
- Q = Qualifier
- WC = Wild card
- LL = Lucky loser
- Alt = Alternate
- ITF = ITF entry
- PR = Protected ranking
- SR = Special ranking
- SE = Special exempt
- JE = Junior exempt
- JR = Junior Accelerator Programme entrant
- CO = College Accelerator Programme entrant
- NG = Next Gen Accelerator Program entrant
- w/o = Walkover
- r = Retired
- d = Defaulted

=== Draw ===
First round
1	(Italy) M Bertolini (Italy) C Brandi	3	6	6
(Czech Republic) P Kovačka (Czech Republic) P Kudrnáč	6	3	4
WC	(Spain) R Carretero (Spain) C Moyá	6^{4}	3
WC	(Argentina) M Puerta (Chile) M Ríos	7^{7}	6
3	(Spain) M Martín (Brazil) A Prieto	6	6
Q	(Italy) U Vico (Czech Republic) T Zíb	2	2
(Czech Republic) T Cibulec (Czech Republic) L Friedl	2	6	2
WC	(Croatia) L Ljubičić (Croatia) L Zovko	6	4	6
(Hungary) G Köves (United States) J Tarango	6	7
(Spain) J Alonso (Argentina) G Cañas	2	5
(Spain) Á López Morón (Spain) A Portas	6	4	7^{7}
4	(Argentina) P Albano (Argentina) S Prieto	2	6	6^{2}
(Germany) M Hilpert (United States) J Thomas	2	5
(South Africa) P Rosner (South Africa) J Weir-Smith	6	7
(Australia) P Hanley (Australia) N Healey	2	6	3
2	(Czech Republic) P Pála (Czech Republic) P Vízner	6	1	6

Quarterfinals
1	(Italy) M Bertolini (Italy) C Brandi	3	5
WC	(Argentina) M Puerta (Chile) M Ríos	6	7
3	(Spain) M Martín (Brazil) A Prieto	3	4
WC	(Croatia) L Ljubičić (Croatia) L Zovko	6	6
(Hungary) G Köves (United States) J Tarango	6	5	6^{5}
(Spain) Á López Morón (Spain) A Portas	3	7	7^{7}
(South Africa) P Rosner (South Africa) J Weir-Smith	6	6
2	(Czech Republic) P Pála (Czech Republic) P Vízner	2	2

Semifinals
WC	(Argentina) M Puerta (Chile) M Ríos
WC	(Croatia) L Ljubičić (Croatia) L Zovko	w/o
(Spain) Á López Morón (Spain) A Portas	7^{8}	6
(South Africa) P Rosner (South Africa) J Weir-Smith	6^{6}	1

Final
WC	(Croatia) L Ljubičić (Croatia) L Zovko	1	6^{2}
(Spain) Á López Morón (Spain) A Portas	6	7^{7}
