= 1999 Croatia Open – Doubles =

Doubles
- 1999 Croatia Open
- 1998 Champions: (United Kingdom) Neil Broad (South Africa) Piet Norval

Final
- Champions: (Argentina) Mariano Puerta (Spain) Javier Sánchez
- Runners-up: (Italy) Massimo Bertolini (Italy) Cristian Brandi
- Score: 3–6, 6–2, 6–3

Details
- Draw: 16 (3WC/1Q)
- Seeds: 4

Events
Singles	Doubles
← 1998 ·	Croatia Open	· 2000 →

Jiří Novák and David Rikl were the defending champions, but none competed this year.

Mariano Puerta and Javier Sánchez won the title by defeating Massimo Bertolini and Cristian Brandi 3–6, 6–2, 6–3 in the final.

== Seeds ==
1. (South Africa) David Adams / (United States) Jeff Tarango (quarterfinals)
2. (Italy) Massimo Bertolini / (Italy) Cristian Brandi (final)
3. (Argentina) Mariano Puerta / (Spain) Javier Sánchez (champions)
4. (Spain) Eduardo Nicolás / (Spain) Germán Puentes (first round)

== Draw ==
=== Key ===
- Q = Qualifier
- WC = Wild card
- LL = Lucky loser
- Alt = Alternate
- ITF = ITF entry
- PR = Protected ranking
- SR = Special ranking
- SE = Special exempt
- JE = Junior exempt
- JR = Junior Accelerator Programme entrant
- CO = College Accelerator Programme entrant
- NG = Next Gen Accelerator Program entrant
- w/o = Walkover
- r = Retired
- d = Defaulted

=== Draw ===
First round
1	(South Africa) D Adams (United States) J Tarango	6	6
WC	(Germany) R Schüttler (Argentina) M Zabaleta	2	1
(Czech Republic) T Anzari (Argentina) A Calleri	4	1
(Morocco) K Alami (Belgium) T Vanhoudt	6	6
3	(Argentina) M Puerta (Spain) J Sánchez	6	5	6
(Czech Republic) T Cibulec (Czech Republic) T Krupa	4	7	4
(Lebanon) A Hamadeh (Sweden) J Landsberg	6	3	6
Q	(Slovakia) D Hrbatý (Czech Republic) B Ulihrach	1	6	3
(Czech Republic) Petr Dezort (Czech Republic) L Friedl	6	2	1
WC	(Spain) R Carretero (Spain) C Moyá	4	6	6
(Spain) Á López Morón (Spain) A Portas	6	6
4	(Spain) E Nicolás (Spain) G Puentes	3	4
(Italy) M Ardinghi (Italy) V Santopadre	5	6^{6}
WC	(Croatia) I Ljubičić (Croatia) L Zovko	7	7^{8}
(New Zealand) J Greenhalgh (South Africa) P Rosner	5	2
2	(Italy) M Bertolini (Italy) C Brandi	7	6

Quarterfinals
1	(South Africa) D Adams (United States) J Tarango	1	7^{8}	6^{4}
(Morocco) K Alami (Belgium) T Vanhoudt	6	6^{6}	7^{7}
3	(Argentina) M Puerta (Spain) J Sánchez	6	6
(Lebanon) A Hamadeh (Sweden) J Landsberg	4	4
WC	(Spain) R Carretero (Spain) C Moyá	2	1
(Spain) Á López Morón (Spain) A Portas	6	6
WC	(Croatia) I Ljubičić (Croatia) L Zovko
2	(Italy) M Bertolini (Italy) C Brandi	w/o

Semifinals
(Morocco) K Alami (Belgium) T Vanhoudt	6^{7}	6	4
3	(Argentina) M Puerta (Spain) J Sánchez	7^{9}	0	6
(Spain) Á López Morón (Spain) A Portas	3	3
2	(Italy) M Bertolini (Italy) C Brandi	6	6

Final
3	(Argentina) M Puerta (Spain) J Sánchez	3	6	6
2	(Italy) M Bertolini (Italy) C Brandi	6	2	3
