= 2000 Chevrolet Cup – Doubles =

Doubles
- 2000 Chevrolet Cup

Final
- Champions: (Brazil) Gustavo Kuerten (Brazil) Antonio Prieto
- Runners-up: (South Africa) Lan Bale (South Africa) Piet Norval
- Score: 6–2, 6–4

Events
Singles	Doubles
← 1998 ·	Chile Open	· 2001 →

The event was not held in 1999. The defending champions from 1998 were Mariano Hood and Sebastián Prieto, who lost in the first round.

Gustavo Kuerten and Antonio Prieto won the title, defeating Lan Bale and Piet Norval 6–2, 6–4 in the final.

== Seeds ==
1. (South Africa) Lan Bale / (South Africa) Piet Norval (final)
2. (Spain) Tomás Carbonell / (Spain) Javier Sánchez (semifinals)
3. (Italy) Cristian Brandi / (Italy) Massimo Bertolini (semifinals)
4. (Argentina) Mariano Hood / (Argentina) Sebastián Prieto (first round)

== Draw ==
=== Key ===
- Q = Qualifier
- WC = Wild card
- LL = Lucky loser
- Alt = Alternate
- ITF = ITF entry
- PR = Protected ranking
- SR = Special ranking
- SE = Special exempt
- JE = Junior exempt
- JR = Junior Accelerator Programme entrant
- CO = College Accelerator Programme entrant
- NG = Next Gen Accelerator Program entrant
- w/o = Walkover
- r = Retired
- d = Defaulted

=== Draw ===
First round
1	(South Africa) L Bale (South Africa) P Norval	7	6
(Argentina) P Albano (Argentina) G Cañas	5	3
(Argentina) M Rodríguez (Serbia and Montenegro) D Vemić	1	5
(Brazil) J Oncins (Argentina) D Orsanic	6	7
3	(Italy) C Brandi (Italy) M Bertolini	6	6
Q	(Argentina) F Cabello (Argentina) A Calleri	2	4
WC	(Chile) F González (Chile) N Massú	3	6	7^{9}
(Argentina) D del Río (Israel) E Ran	6	4	6^{7}
LL	(Chile) H Gamonal (Chile) A García	5	6	3
WC	(Brazil) G Kuerten (Brazil) A Prieto	7	3	6
(Argentina) M García (Argentina) M Puerta	6	6
4	(Argentina) M Hood (Argentina) S Prieto	2	3
(Spain) JI Carrasco (Spain) J Velasco Jr.	3	6	4
(Spain) Á López Morón (Spain) A Portas	6	4	6
(The Bahamas) M Merklein (United States) F Montana	7^{7}	3	3
2	(Spain) T Carbonell (Spain) J Sánchez	6^{2}	6	6

Quarterfinals
1	(South Africa) L Bale (South Africa) P Norval	6	6
(Brazil) J Oncins (Argentina) D Orsanic	4	3
3	(Italy) C Brandi (Italy) M Bertolini	6	6
WC	(Chile) F González (Chile) N Massú	1	2
WC	(Brazil) G Kuerten (Brazil) A Prieto	6	6
(Argentina) M García (Argentina) M Puerta	4	2
(Spain) Á López Morón (Spain) A Portas	4	6^{5}
2	(Spain) T Carbonell (Spain) J Sánchez	6	7^{7}

Semifinals
1	(South Africa) L Bale (South Africa) P Norval	4	6	6
3	(Italy) C Brandi (Italy) M Bertolini	6	3	4
WC	(Brazil) G Kuerten (Brazil) A Prieto	7^{7}	7^{7}
2	(Spain) T Carbonell (Spain) J Sánchez	6^{4}	6^{5}

Final
1	(South Africa) L Bale (South Africa) P Norval	2	4
WC	(Brazil) G Kuerten (Brazil) A Prieto	6	6
