= 2001 Chevrolet Cup – Doubles =

Doubles
- 2001 Chevrolet Cup

Final
- Champions: (Argentina) Lucas Arnold (Spain) Tomás Carbonell
- Runners-up: (Argentina) Mariano Hood (Argentina) Sebastián Prieto
- Score: 6–4, 2–6, 6–3

Events
Singles	Doubles
← 2000 ·	Chevrolet Cup	· 2002 →

Gustavo Kuerten and Antonio Prieto were the defending champions but only Prieto competed that year with Álex Calatrava.

Calatrava and Prieto lost in the first round to Sergio Roitman and Andrés Schneiter.

Lucas Arnold and Tomás Carbonell won in the final 6–4, 2–6, 6–3 against Mariano Hood and Sebastián Prieto.

== Seeds ==
1. (Sweden) Simon Aspelin / (Argentina) Martín García (quarterfinals)
2. (Argentina) Lucas Arnold / (Spain) Tomás Carbonell (champions)
3. (Italy) Cristian Brandi / (Argentina) Daniel Orsanic (first round)
4. (Spain) Álex López Morón / (Spain) Albert Portas (first round)

== Draw ==
=== Key ===
- Q = Qualifier
- WC = Wild card
- LL = Lucky loser
- Alt = Alternate
- ITF = ITF entry
- PR = Protected ranking
- SR = Special ranking
- SE = Special exempt
- JE = Junior exempt
- JR = Junior Accelerator Programme entrant
- CO = College Accelerator Programme entrant
- NG = Next Gen Accelerator Program entrant
- w/o = Walkover
- r = Retired
- d = Defaulted

First round
1	(Sweden) S Aspelin (Argentina) M García	6	1	6
LL	(France) N Coutelot (France) A di Pasquale	3	6	3
(Argentina) S Roitman (Italy) A Schneiter	6	2	7^{7}
(Spain) Á Calatrava (Brazil) A Prieto	3	6	6^{2}
4	(Spain) Á López Morón (Spain) A Portas	6^{8}	6	3
(South Africa) B Haygarth (Israel) E Ran	7^{10}	0	6
(Argentina) M Hood (Argentina) S Prieto	6	7^{7}
WC	(Morocco) K Alami (Chile) M Ríos	3	6^{1}
WC	(Chile) J Fillol Jr. (Chile) A García	5	6^{1}
Q	(Argentina) G Cañas (Argentina) L Lobo	7	7^{7}
(Australia) T Crichton (Australia) A Fisher	6	6
3	(Italy) C Brandi (Argentina) D Orsanic	4	3
(Spain) E Benfele Álvarez (Argentina) M Rodríguez	6	6
(Czech Republic) P Kovačka (Czech Republic) P Kudrnáč	2	4
(Spain) G Puentes (Spain) J Velasco Jr.	2	4
2	(Argentina) L Arnold (Spain) T Carbonell	6	6

Quarterfinals
1	(Sweden) S Aspelin (Argentina) M García	6^{4}	6^{4}
(Argentina) S Roitman (Italy) A Schneiter	7^{7}	7^{7}
(South Africa) B Haygarth (Israel) E Ran	6	3	2
(Argentina) M Hood (Argentina) S Prieto	4	6	6
Q	(Argentina) G Cañas (Argentina) L Lobo	5	7^{8}	1
(Australia) T Crichton (Australia) A Fisher	7	6^{6}	6
(Spain) E Benfele Álvarez (Argentina) M Rodríguez	6^{1}	7	4
2	(Argentina) L Arnold (Spain) T Carbonell	7^{7}	5	6

Semifinals
(Argentina) S Roitman (Italy) A Schneiter	5	2
(Argentina) M Hood (Argentina) S Prieto	7	6
(Australia) T Crichton (Australia) A Fisher	4	2
2	(Argentina) L Arnold (Spain) T Carbonell	6	6

Final
(Argentina) M Hood (Argentina) S Prieto	4	6	3
2	(Argentina) L Arnold (Spain) T Carbonell	6	2	6
