= 2000 Chevrolet Cup =

- Date: 28 February – 6 March
- Edition: 7th
- Category: International Series
- Draw: 32S/ 16D
- Prize money: $350,000
- Location: Santiago, Chile

Champions

Singles
- (Brazil) Gustavo Kuerten

Doubles
- (Brazil) Gustavo Kuerten / (Brazil) Antonio Prieto
← 1998 ·	Chile Open	· 2001 →

The 2000 Chevrolet Cup was an ATP men's tennis tournament held on outdoor clay courts in Santiago, Chile that was part of the International Series category of the 2000 ATP Tour. It was the seventh edition of the tournament and was held from 28 February until 6 March 2000. First-seeded Gustavo Kuerten won the singles title.

== Finals ==
=== Singles ===
(Brazil) Gustavo Kuerten defeated (Argentina) Mariano Puerta 7–6^{(7–3)}, 6–3

- It was Kuerten's 2nd title of the year and the 13th of his career.

=== Doubles ===
(Brazil) Gustavo Kuerten / (Brazil) Antonio Prieto defeated (South Africa) Lan Bale / (South Africa) Piet Norval 6–2, 6–4

- It was Kuerten's 1st title of the year and the 12th of his career. It was Prieto's only title of the year and the 1st of his career.
