= 1998 Chevrolet Cup – Doubles =

Doubles
- 1998 Chevrolet Cup

Final
- Champions: (Argentina) Mariano Hood (Argentina) Sebastián Prieto
- Runners-up: (Italy) Massimo Bertolini (United States) Devin Bowen
- Score: 7–6, 6–7, 7–6

Events
Singles	Doubles
← 1997 ·	Chile Open	· 2000 →

Hendrik Jan Davids and Andrew Kratzmann were the defending champions, but did not participate this year.

Mariano Hood and Sebastián Prieto won the title, defeating Massimo Bertolini and Devin Bowen 7–6, 6–7, 7–6 in the final.

== Seeds ==
1. (Argentina) Daniel Orsanic / (Mexico) David Roditi (quarterfinals)
2. (Spain) Julián Alonso / (Ecuador) Nicolás Lapentti (first round)
3. (Argentina) Mariano Hood / (Argentina) Sebastián Prieto (champions)
4. (United States) Brandon Coupe / (South Africa) Paul Rosner (first round)

== Draw ==
=== Key ===
- Q = Qualifier
- WC = Wild card
- LL = Lucky loser
- Alt = Alternate
- SE = Special exempt
- PR = Protected ranking
- ITF = ITF entry
- JE = Junior exempt
- w/o = Walkover
- r = Retired
- d = Defaulted
- SR = Special ranking

=== Draw ===
First round
1	(Argentina) D Orsanic (Mexico) D Roditi	6	7
(Brazil) M Carlsson (Brazil) F Meligeni	1	5
(Argentina) P Albano (Spain) J Balcells	6	6	3
(South Africa) L Bale (United Kingdom) D Sapsford	7	4	6
3	(Argentina) M Hood (Argentina) S Prieto	6	6
(Spain) A Berasategui (Spain) J Burillo	3	2
(Brazil) G Kuerten (Brazil) R Schlachter	3	6	2
(Argentina) L Arnold (Argentina) M Puerta	6	4	6
(Italy) M Bertolin (United States) D Bowen	6	6
(Hungary) G Köves (Brazil) A Sá	4	3
(Argentina) L Lobo (Chile) M Ríos	6	6	6
4	(United States) B Coupe (South Africa) P Rosner	2	7	1
(Argentina) D del Río (Argentina) M Rodríguez	6	7
Q	(Argentina) Francisco Cabello (Argentina) E Medica	3	6
WC	(Spain) F Mantilla (Chile) N Massú	6	1	7
2	(Spain) J Alonso (Ecuador) N Lapentti	3	6	6

Quarterfinals
1	(Argentina) D Orsanic (Mexico) D Roditi	4	4
(South Africa) L Bale (United Kingdom) D Sapsford	6	6
3	(Argentina) M Hood (Argentina) S Prieto	3	6	6
(Argentina) L Arnold (Argentina) M Puerta	6	0	3
(Italy) M Bertolin (United States) D Bowen	w/o
(Argentina) L Lobo (Chile) M Ríos
(Argentina) D del Río (Argentina) M Rodríguez	4	6	6
WC	(Spain) F Mantilla (Chile) N Massú	6	3	7

Semifinals
(South Africa) L Bale (United Kingdom) D Sapsford	6	6	4
3	(Argentina) M Hood (Argentina) S Prieto	4	7	6
(Italy) M Bertolin (United States) D Bowen	7	6
WC	(Spain) F Mantilla (Chile) N Massú	6	3

Final
3	(Argentina) M Hood (Argentina) S Prieto	7	6	7
(Italy) M Bertolin (United States) D Bowen	6	7	6
