= 2002 Allianz Suisse Open Gstaad =

- Date: 8–14 July
- Edition: 57th
- Category: International Series
- Draw: 32S / 16D
- Prize money: $575,000
- Surface: Clay / outdoor
- Location: Gstaad, Switzerland
- Venue: Roy Emerson Arena

Champions

Singles
- (Spain) Àlex Corretja

Doubles
- (Australia) Joshua Eagle / (Czech Republic) David Rikl
- Swiss Open

The 2002 Allianz Suisse Open Gstaad was a men's tennis tournament played on outdoor clay courts at the Roy Emerson Arena in Gstaad in Switzerland and was part of the International Series of the 2002 ATP Tour. It was the 57th edition of the tournament and was held from 8 July until 14 July 2002. Eighth-seeded Àlex Corretja won the singles title.

== Finals ==
=== Singles ===
(Spain) Àlex Corretja defeated (Argentina) Gastón Gaudio 6–3, 7–6^{(7–3)}, 7–6^{(7–3)}

- It was Corretja's 1st title of the year and the 19th of his career.

=== Doubles ===
(Australia) Joshua Eagle / (Czech Republic) David Rikl defeated (Italy) Massimo Bertolini / (Italy) Cristian Brandi 7–6^{(7–5)}, 6–4

- It was Eagle's 1st title of the year and the 3rd of his career. It was Rikl's 3rd title of the year and the 25th of his career.
