= 1998 Chevrolet Cup – Singles =

Singles
- 1998 Chevrolet Cup

Final
- Champion: (Spain) Francisco Clavet
- Runner-up: (Morocco) Younes El Aynaoui
- Score: 6–2, 6–4

Details
- Draw: 32
- Seeds: 8

Events
Singles	Doubles
← 1997 ·	Chile Open	· 2000 →

Julián Alonso was the defending champion, but lost in the second round this year.

Francisco Clavet won the title, defeating Younes El Aynaoui 6–2, 6–4 in the final.

== Seeds ==
1. (Chile) Marcelo Ríos (quarterfinals)
2. (Spain) Félix Mantilla (semifinals)
3. (Spain) Alberto Berasategui (second round)
4. (Brazil) Gustavo Kuerten (second round)
5. (Spain) Francisco Clavet (champion)
6. (Argentina) Mariano Puerta (quarterfinals, retired)
7. (Slovakia) Dominik Hrbatý (second round)
8. (Argentina) Franco Squillari (second round)

== Draw ==
=== Key ===
- Q = Qualifier
- WC = Wild card
- LL = Lucky loser
- Alt = Alternate
- SE = Special exempt
- PR = Protected ranking
- ITF = ITF entry
- JE = Junior exempt
- w/o = Walkover
- r = Retired
- d = Defaulted
- SR = Special ranking

=== Finals ===
Semifinals
(Costa Rica) Juan Antonio Marín	2	5
5	(Spain) Francisco Clavet	6	7
(Morocco) Younes El Aynaoui	6	6
2	(Spain) Félix Mantilla	4	4

Final
5	(Spain) Francisco Clavet	6	6
(Morocco) Younes El Aynaoui	2	4

=== Top half ===
First round
1	(Chile) M Ríos	6	1	6
LL	(Brazil) M Carlsson	2	6	3
(Argentina) G Cañas	6	3	6^{7}
(Argentina) M Rodríguez	3	6	7^{9}
(Italy) G Pozzi	6	1	3
(Costa Rica) J A Marín	3	6	6
WC	(Chile) N Massú	3	5
8	(Argentina) F Squillari	6	7
4	(Brazil) G Kuerten	7^{7}	4	5
Q	(Ecuador) L A Morejon	6^{5}	6	7
(Ecuador) N Lapentti	4	6	6
(Spain) C Costa	6	3	3
(Spain) J Alonso	5
LL	(Spain) J A Viloca	2^{r}
(Paraguay) R Delgado	4	4
5	(Spain) F Clavet	6	6

Second round
1	(Chile) M Ríos	6	6
(Argentina) M Rodríguez	2	2
(Costa Rica) J A Marín	6	4	6
8	(Argentina) F Squillari	4	6	4
4	(Brazil) G Kuerten	6^{3}	3
(Ecuador) N Lapentti	7^{7}	6
(Spain) J Alonso	1	6^{9}
5	(Spain) F Clavet	6	7^{11}

Quarterfinals
1	(Chile) M Ríos	4	7^{7}	5
(Costa Rica) J A Marín	6	6^{5}	7
(Ecuador) N Lapentti	4	4
5	(Spain) F Clavet	6	6

Semifinals
(Costa Rica) J A Marín	2	5
5	(Spain) F Clavet	6	7

=== Bottom half ===
First round
6	(Argentina) M Puerta	2	7^{7}	6
(Spain) F Vicente	6	6^{2}	3
Q	(Argentina) M Hood	2	6	3
(Argentina) L Arnold Ker	6	3	6
(Morocco) K Alami	3	4
(Morocco) Y El Aynaoui	6	6
(Spain) G Blanco	1	3
3	(Spain) A Berasategui	6	6
7	(Slovakia) D Hrbatý	7^{7}	6
Q	(Brazil) A Sá	6^{3}	4
LL	(Italy) M Martelli	6^{2}	4
WC	(United States) J Courier	7^{7}	6
(Brazil) F Meligeni	4	6	1
Q	(Argentina) E Medica	6	1	6
(Argentina) M Zabaleta	2	3
2	(Spain) F Mantilla	6	6

Second round
6	(Argentina) M Puerta	6	7
(Argentina) L Arnold Ker	3	5
(Morocco) Y El Aynaoui	7^{7}	6
3	(Spain) A Berasategui	6^{1}	1
7	(Slovakia) D Hrbatý	6^{5}	4
WC	(United States) J Courier	7^{7}	6
Q	(Argentina) E Medica	0	1
2	(Spain) F Mantilla	6	6

Quarterfinals
6	(Argentina) M Puerta	2	0^{r}
(Morocco) Y El Aynaoui	6	1
WC	(United States) J Courier	6	3	6^{6}
2	(Spain) F Mantilla	3	6	7^{8}

Semifinals
(Morocco) Y El Aynaoui	6	6
2	(Spain) F Mantilla	4	4
