= 1999 Croatia Open – Singles =

Singles
- 1999 Croatia Open
- 1998 Champion: (Czech Republic) Bohdan Ulihrach

Final
- Champion: (Sweden) Magnus Norman
- Runner-up: (United States) Jeff Tarango
- Score: 6–2, 6–4

Details
- Draw: 32 (3WC/4Q)
- Seeds: 8

Events
Singles	Doubles
← 1998 ·	Croatia Open	· 2000 →

Bohdan Ulihrach was the defending champion, but lost in the first round to Juan Antonio Marín.

Magnus Norman won the title by defeating Jeff Tarango 6–2, 6–4 in the final.

== Seeds ==
1. (Spain) Carlos Moyá (quarterfinals)
2. (Spain) Félix Mantilla (second round)
3. (Slovakia) Dominik Hrbatý (quarterfinals)
4. (Spain) Francisco Clavet (quarterfinals)
5. (Argentina) Mariano Zabaleta (first round)
6. (Czech Republic) Bohdan Ulihrach (first round)
7. (Argentina) Mariano Puerta (first round)
8. (Sweden) Magnus Norman (champion)

== Draw ==
=== Key ===
- Q = Qualifier
- WC = Wild card
- LL = Lucky loser
- Alt = Alternate
- ITF = ITF entry
- PR = Protected ranking
- SR = Special ranking
- SE = Special exempt
- JE = Junior exempt
- JR = Junior Accelerator Programme entrant
- CO = College Accelerator Programme entrant
- NG = Next Gen Accelerator Program entrant
- w/o = Walkover
- r = Retired
- d = Defaulted

=== Finals ===
Semifinals
8	(Sweden) Magnus Norman	6	6
WC	(Croatia) Ivan Ljubičić	0	2
(United States) Jeff Tarango	7^{10}	6
(Spain) Albert Portas	6^{8}	0

Final
8	(Sweden) Magnus Norman	6	6
(United States) Jeff Tarango	2	4

=== Top half ===
First round
1	(Spain) C Moyá	6	1	7
(Italy) D Sanguinetti	4	6	5
(Finland) V Liukko	6	2	6
Q	(Croatia) I Beroš	3	6	2
(Morocco) K Alami	1	6^{3}
(Argentina) G Cañas	6	7^{7}
(Spain) G Puentes	3	1
8	(Sweden) M Norman	6	6
3	(Slovakia) D Hrbatý	7	7
WC	(Croatia) L Zovko	5	5
WC	(Spain) S Bruguera	6^{4}	0
(Germany) R Schüttler	7^{7}	6
(France) A Di Pasquale	2	1
(Norway) C Ruud	6	6
WC	(Croatia) I Ljubičić	7^{7}	7
5	(Argentina) M Zabaleta	6^{4}	5

Second round
1	(Spain) C Moyá	6	6
(Finland) V Liukko	4	4
(Argentina) G Cañas	4	3
8	(Sweden) M Norman	6	6
3	(Slovakia) D Hrbatý	6	6
(Germany) R Schüttler	4	3
(Norway) C Ruud	3	6	5
WC	(Croatia) I Ljubičić	6	3	7

Quarterfinals
1	(Spain) C Moyá	2	6^{8}
8	(Sweden) M Norman	6	7^{10}
3	(Slovakia) D Hrbatý	0	7^{7}	4
WC	(Croatia) I Ljubičić	6	6^{4}	6

Semifinals
8	(Sweden) M Norman	6	6
WC	(Croatia) I Ljubičić	0	2

=== Bottom half ===
First round
6	(Czech Republic) B Ulihrach	6	4	2
(Costa Rica) JA Marín	3	6	6
(Czech Republic) T Zíb	6	4	0
(United States) J Tarango	3	6	6
Q	(Spain) R Carretero	6	6
Q	(Sweden) J Landsberg	2	3
(Germany) O Gross	6^{1}	2
4	(Spain) F Clavet	7^{7}	6
7	(Argentina) M Puerta	7^{8}	2	3
(Argentina) A Calleri	6^{6}	6	6
Q	(Slovenia) B Urh	7	3	7^{7}
(Italy) V Santopadre	5	6	6^{2}
(Spain) A Berasategui	4	0
(Spain) A Portas	6	6
(Spain) J Díaz	6	1	0
2	(Spain) F Mantilla	4	6	6

Second round
(Costa Rica) JA Marín	6^{3}	3
(United States) J Tarango	7^{7}	6
Q	(Spain) R Carretero	4	6^{6}
4	(Spain) F Clavet	6	7^{8}
(Argentina) A Calleri	6	6
Q	(Slovenia) B Urh	0	1
(Spain) A Portas	6	6
2	(Spain) F Mantilla	4	4

Quarterfinals
(United States) J Tarango	7	5	6
4	(Spain) F Clavet	5	7	2
(Argentina) A Calleri	5	6	4
(Spain) A Portas	7	2	6

Semifinals
(United States) J Tarango	7^{10}	6
(Spain) A Portas	6^{8}	0
