= 1997 Chevrolet Cup – Singles =

Singles
- 1997 Movistar Open

Final
- Champion: (Spain) Julián Alonso
- Runner-up: (Chile) Marcelo Ríos
- Score: 6–2, 6–1

Details
- Draw: 32
- Seeds: 8

Events
Singles	Doubles
← 1996 ·	Movistar Open	· 1998 →

Hernán Gumy was the defending champion, but lost in the second round this year.

Julián Alonso won the title, defeating Marcelo Ríos 6–2, 6–1 in the final.

== Seeds ==
1. (Chile) Marcelo Ríos (final)
2. (Spain) Francisco Clavet (second round)
3. (Germany) Tommy Haas (first round)
4. (Spain) Julián Alonso (champion)
5. (Uruguay) Marcelo Filippini (semifinals)
6. (Spain) Galo Blanco (first round)
7. (Morocco) Karim Alami (first round)
8. (Spain) Carlos Costa (first round)

== Draw ==
=== Key ===
- Q = Qualifier
- WC = Wild card
- LL = Lucky loser
- Alt = Alternate
- SE = Special exempt
- PR = Protected ranking
- ITF = ITF entry
- JE = Junior exempt
- w/o = Walkover
- r = Retired
- d = Defaulted
- SR = Special ranking

=== Finals ===
Semifinals
1	(Chile) Marcelo Ríos	6	6
5	(Uruguay) Marcelo Filippini	4	4
4	(Spain) Julián Alonso	6	4	6
2	(Spain) Jordi Burillo	1	6	3

Final
1	(Chile) Marcelo Ríos	2	1
4	(Spain) Julián Alonso	6	6

=== Top half ===
First round
1	(Chile) M Ríos	6	7
(Italy) D Sanguinetti	2	5
Q	(Argentina) S Prieto	6	6
(Ecuador) N Lapentti	4	4
(Brazil) F Meligeni	6	3	6
Q	(Spain) J Díaz	3	6	2
WC	(Chile) G Silberstein	6	6
8	(Spain) C Costa	2	4
3	(Germany) T Haas	3	2
(Italy) A Gaudenzi	6	6
Q	(Argentina) F Cabello	4	6^{3}
(Czech Republic) R Vašek	6	7^{7}
(Spain) A Martín	6	5	6
WC	(Chile) H Gamonal	4	7	4
(Spain) E Benfele Álvarez	2	6^{2}
5	(Uruguay) M Filippini	6	7^{7}

Second round
1	(Chile) M Ríos	5	6	6
Q	(Argentina) S Prieto	7	1	4
(Brazil) F Meligeni	4	6	6
WC	(Chile) G Silberstein	6	3	2
(Italy) A Gaudenzi	4	5
(Czech Republic) R Vašek	6	7
(Spain) A Martín	5	3
5	(Uruguay) M Filippini	7	6

Quarterfinals
1	(Chile) M Ríos	1	7^{7}	6
(Brazil) F Meligeni	6	6^{5}	1
(Czech Republic) R Vašek	1	5
5	(Uruguay) M Filippini	6	7

Semifinals
1	(Chile) M Ríos	6	6
5	(Uruguay) M Filippini	4	4

=== Bottom half ===
First round
6	(Spain) G Blanco	4	3
Q	(Argentina) M Puerta	6	6
WC	(Chile) N Massú	7^{7}	5	3
(Spain) J A Viloca	6^{4}	7	6
(Spain) J A Marín	5	1
(Germany) M Craca	7	6
(Romania) D Pescariu	4	7^{7}	1
4	(Spain) J Alonso	6	6^{1}	6
7	(Morocco) K Alami	5	2
(Germany) O Gross	7	6
(Argentina) H Gumy	6	6
(Spain) F Vicente	2	2
(Romania) A Pavel	4	7^{10}	6^{8}
(Spain) J Burillo	6	6^{8}	7^{10}
(United States) V Spadea	6^{4}	3
2	(Spain) F Clavet	7^{7}	6

Second round
Q	(Argentina) M Puerta	6	6
(Spain) J A Viloca	4	3
(Germany) M Craca	4	6	5
4	(Spain) J Alonso	6	1	7
(Germany) O Gross	5	6	6
(Argentina) H Gumy	7	1	3
(Spain) J Burillo	7^{7}	3	6
2	(Spain) F Clavet	6^{5}	6	3

Quarterfinals
Q	(Argentina) M Puerta	4	2
4	(Spain) J Alonso	6	6
(Germany) O Gross	4	4
(Spain) J Burillo	6	6

Semifinals
4	(Spain) J Alonso	6	4	6
(Spain) J Burillo	1	6	3
