= 1999 Croatia Open =

- Date: 26 July – 1 August
- Edition: 10th
- Category: World Series
- Draw: 32S / 16D
- Prize money: $375,000
- Surface: Clay / outdoor
- Location: Umag, Croatia

Champions

Singles
- (Sweden) Magnus Norman

Doubles
- (Argentina) Mariano Puerta / (Spain) Javier Sánchez
| ← 1998 · | Croatia Open | · 2000 → |

The 1999 Croatia Open, also known as the International Championship of Croatia-Umag, was a men's tennis tournament played on outdoor clay courts in Umag, Croatia that was part of the World Series of the 1999 ATP Tour. It was the tenth edition of the tournament and was held from 26 July until 1 August 1999. Eighth-seeded Magnus Norman won the singles title.

== Finals ==
=== Singles ===
(Sweden) Magnus Norman defeated (United States) Jeff Tarango, 6–2, 6–4

- It was Norman's 3rd singles title of the year and the 5th of his career.

=== Doubles ===
(Argentina) Mariano Puerta / (Spain) Javier Sánchez defeated (Italy) Massimo Bertolini / (Italy) Cristian Brandi, 3–6, 6–2, 6–3

== See also ==
- 1999 Croatian Bol Ladies Open
