= 2002 BellSouth Open – Doubles =

Doubles
- 2002 BellSouth Open

Final
- Champions: (Argentina) Gastón Etlis (Argentina) Martín Rodríguez
- Runners-up: (Argentina) Lucas Arnold (Argentina) Luis Lobo
- Score: 6–3, 6–4

Events
Singles	Doubles
← 2001 ·	BellSouth Open	· 2003 →

Lucas Arnold and Tomás Carbonell were the defending champions but only Arnold competed that year with Luis Lobo.

Arnold and Lobo lost in the final 6–3, 6–4 against Gastón Etlis and Martín Rodríguez.

== Seeds ==
1. (Argentina) Martín García / (Argentina) Mariano Hood (first round)
2. (Argentina) Daniel Orsanic / (Argentina) Sebastián Prieto (first round)
3. (Argentina) Lucas Arnold / (Argentina) Luis Lobo (final)
4. (Argentina) Gastón Etlis / (Argentina) Martín Rodríguez (champions)

== Draw ==
=== Key ===
- Q = Qualifier
- WC = Wild card
- LL = Lucky loser
- Alt = Alternate
- ITF = ITF entry
- PR = Protected ranking
- SR = Special ranking
- SE = Special exempt
- JE = Junior exempt
- JR = Junior Accelerator Programme entrant
- CO = College Accelerator Programme entrant
- NG = Next Gen Accelerator Program entrant
- w/o = Walkover
- r = Retired
- d = Defaulted

First round
1	(Argentina) M García (Argentina) M Hood	3	3
(Spain) Á López Morón (Spain) G Puentes	6	6
(Australia) P Hanley (Australia) N Healey	6	6
(United States) D Bowen (Australia) A Fisher	2	4
3	(Argentina) L Arnold (Argentina) L Lobo	6	6
(Australia) T Perry (South Africa) S Rudman	3	3
WC	(Chile) J Fillol Jr. (Chile) A García	6^{3}	2
(Argentina) E Massa (United States) J Thomas	7^{7}	6
WC	(Chile) N Massú (Chile) M Ríos	1	6	[7]
(Italy) E Artoni (Brazil) D Melo	6	4	[10]
(France) J Golmard (Argentina) D Nalbandian	5	7^{8}	[5]
4	(Argentina) G Etlis (Argentina) M Rodríguez	7	6^{6}	[10]
(Argentina) G Gaudio (Ecuador) N Lapentti	6	6
(Argentina) S Roitman (Argentina) A Schneiter	2	2
WC	(Argentina) J Acasuso (Chile) F González	6	6
2	(Argentina) D Orsanic (Argentina) S Prieto	3	4

Quarterfinals
(Spain) Á López Morón (Spain) G Puentes	4	2
(Australia) P Hanley (Australia) N Healey	6	6
3	(Argentina) L Arnold (Argentina) L Lobo	6	6
(Argentina) E Massa (United States) J Thomas	4	4
(Italy) E Artoni (Brazil) D Melo	1	4
4	(Argentina) G Etlis (Argentina) M Rodríguez	6	6
(Argentina) G Gaudio (Ecuador) N Lapentti
WC	(Argentina) J Acasuso (Chile) F González	w/o

Semifinals
(Australia) P Hanley (Australia) N Healey	4	6	[7]
3	(Argentina) L Arnold (Argentina) L Lobo	6	3	[10]
4	(Argentina) G Etlis (Argentina) M Rodríguez	6	6
WC	(Argentina) J Acasuso (Chile) F González	3	2

Final
3	(Argentina) L Arnold (Argentina) L Lobo	3	4
4	(Argentina) G Etlis (Argentina) M Rodríguez	6	6
