= 2002 Allianz Suisse Open Gstaad – Doubles =

Doubles
- 2002 Allianz Suisse Open Gstaad

Final
- Champions: (Australia) Joshua Eagle (Czech Republic) David Rikl
- Runners-up: (Italy) Massimo Bertolini (Italy) Cristian Brandi
- Score: 7–6^{(7–5)}, 6–4

Details
- Draw: 16
- Seeds: 4

Events
| Singles | Doubles |
- Swiss Open

Roger Federer and Marat Safin were the defending champions but only Federer competed that year with Michel Kratochvil.

Federer and Kratochvil lost in the first round to Jim Thomas and Tom Vanhoudt.

Joshua Eagle and David Rikl won in the final 7–6^{(7–5)}, 6–4 against Massimo Bertolini and Cristian Brandi.

== Seeds ==
Champion seeds are indicated in bold text while text in italics indicates the round in which those seeds were eliminated.

1. (Australia) **Joshua Eagle** / (Czech Republic) **David Rikl (champions)**
2. (Czech Republic) Petr Pála / (Czech Republic) Pavel Vízner (semifinals)
3. (Czech Republic) Petr Luxa / (Czech Republic) Radek Štěpánek (first round)
4. (Czech Republic) Tomáš Cibulec / (Czech Republic) Leoš Friedl (semifinals)

== Draw ==
Key

- Q = Qualifier
- WC = Wild card
- LL = Lucky loser
- Alt = Alternate
- ITF = ITF entry
- PR = Protected ranking
- SR = Special ranking
- SE = Special exempt
- JE = Junior exempt
- JR = Junior Accelerator Programme entrant
- CO = College Accelerator Programme entrant
- NG = Next Gen Accelerator Program entrant
- w/o = Walkover
- r = Retired
- d = Defaulted

First round
1 | (Australia) **J Eagle** (Czech Republic) **D Rikl** | **6** | **6**
(Australia) T Crichton (Australia) T Perry | 3 | 2
(Australia) N Healey (Czech Republic) D Vacek | 6^{3} | 6^{5}
(Spain) **À Corretja** (Spain) **A Costa** | **7^{7}** | **7^{7}**
4 | (Czech Republic) **T Cibulec** (Czech Republic) **L Friedl** | **7^{7}** | **6**
WC | (Argentina) G Gaudio (Ecuador) N Lapentti | 6^{3} | 4
(Argentina) **M Rodríguez** (Argentina) **A Schneiter** | **6** | **7**
(South Africa) P Rosner (Czech Republic) D Škoch | 4 | 5
(Switzerland) R Federer (Switzerland) M Kratochvil | 6^{6} | **6** | 2
(United States) **J Thomas** (Belgium) **T Vanhoudt** | **7^{8}** | 2 | **6**
(Italy) **M Bertolini** (Italy) **C Brandi** | 2 | **6** | **7**
3 | (Czech Republic) P Luxa (Czech Republic) R Štěpánek | **6** | 3 | 5
(Australia) J Kerr (Australia) G Silcock | 4 | **6** | 6^{4}
WC | (Switzerland) **G Bastl** (Switzerland) **M Rosset** | **6** | 3 | **7^{7}**
WC | (Switzerland) I Heuberger (France) C Pioline | 3 | **7** | 3
2 | (Czech Republic) **P Pála** (Czech Republic) **P Vízner** | **6** | 5 | **6**

Quarterfinals
1 | (Australia) **J Eagle** (Czech Republic) **D Rikl** | **6** | 3 | **6**
(Spain) À Corretja (Spain) A Costa | 1 | **6** | 4
4 | (Czech Republic) **T Cibulec** (Czech Republic) **L Friedl** | **6** | **7^{7}**
(Argentina) M Rodríguez (Argentina) A Schneiter | 3 | 6^{5}
(United States) J Thomas (Belgium) T Vanhoudt | 4 | **7^{7}** | 3
(Italy) **M Bertolini** (Italy) **C Brandi** | **6** | 6^{2} | **6**
WC | (Switzerland) G Bastl (Switzerland) M Rosset | **7^{9}** | 6^{9} | 2
2 | (Czech Republic) **P Pála** (Czech Republic) **P Vízner** | 6^{7} | **7^{11}** | **6**

Semifinals
1 | (Australia) **J Eagle** (Czech Republic) **D Rikl** | **6** | **6**
4 | (Czech Republic) T Cibulec (Czech Republic) L Friedl | 1 | 3
(Italy) **M Bertolini** (Italy) **C Brandi** | 5 | **6** | **7**
2 | (Czech Republic) P Pála (Czech Republic) P Vízner | **7** | 4 | 5

Final
1 | (Australia) **J Eagle** (Czech Republic) **D Rikl** | **7^{7}** | **6**
(Italy) M Bertolini (Italy) C Brandi | 6^{5} | 4
