= 2000 Croatia Open – Singles =

Singles
- 2000 Croatia Open
- 1999 Champion: (Sweden) Magnus Norman

Final
- Champion: (Chile) Marcelo Ríos
- Runner-up: (Argentina) Mariano Puerta
- Score: 7–6^{(7–1)}, 4–6, 6–3

Details
- Draw: 32 (4 Q / 3 WC )
- Seeds: 8

Events
| Singles | Doubles |
| ← 1999 · | Croatia Open | · 2001 → |

Magnus Norman was the defending champion, but chose to compete at Stuttgart in the same week.

Marcelo Ríos won the title by defeating Mariano Puerta 7–6^{(7–1)}, 4–6, 6–3 in the final.

== Seeds ==
1. (Argentina) Mariano Puerta (final)
2. (Chile) Marcelo Ríos (champion)
3. (Spain) Albert Portas (second round)
4. (Spain) Carlos Moyá (semifinals)
5. (United States) Jeff Tarango (first round)
6. (Spain) Alberto Martín (quarterfinals)
7. (Czech Republic) Martin Damm (quarterfinals)
8. (Spain) Galo Blanco (second round)

== Draw ==
=== Key ===
- Q = Qualifier
- WC = Wild card
- LL = Lucky loser
- Alt = Alternate
- ITF = ITF entry
- PR = Protected ranking
- SR = Special ranking
- SE = Special exempt
- JE = Junior exempt
- JR = Junior Accelerator Programme entrant
- CO = College Accelerator Programme entrant
- NG = Next Gen Accelerator Program entrant
- w/o = Walkover
- r = Retired
- d = Defaulted

=== Finals ===
Semifinals
1 | (Argentina) Mariano Puerta | 4 | 6 | 6
(Czech Republic) Bohdan Ulihrach | 6 | 2 | 3
4 | (Spain) Carlos Moyá | 2 | 5
2 | (Chile) Marcelo Ríos | 6 | 7

Final
1 | (Argentina) Mariano Puerta | 6^{1} | 6 | 3
2 | (Chile) Marcelo Ríos | 7^{7} | 4 | 6

=== Top half ===
First round
1 | (Argentina) M Puerta | 6 | 6
(Spain) J Alonso | 4 | 1
(Croatia) I Ljubičić | 7^{8} | 6
WC | (Croatia) L Zovko | 6^{6} | 2
(Czech Republic) J Vaněk | 3 | 6 | 5
WC | (Spain) S Bruguera | 6 | 1 | 7
WC | (Germany) Dennis Peschek | 2 | 1
7 | (Czech Republic) M Damm | 6 | 6
3 | (Spain) A Portas | 6 | 6
(Czech Republic) P Kralert | 1 | 3
(Austria) M Hipfl | 4 | 5
(Czech Republic) B Ulihrach | 6 | 7
Q | (Austria) W Schranz | 3 | 6 | 7^{9}
(Spain) Á López Morón | 6 | 2 | 6^{7}
(Argentina) G Cañas | 6 | 0 | 4
6 | (Spain) A Martín | 1 | 6 | 6

Second round
1 | (Argentina) M Puerta | 6 | 4 | 6
(Croatia) I Ljubičić | 4 | 6 | 4
WC | (Spain) S Bruguera | 3 | 6 | 3
7 | (Czech Republic) M Damm | 6 | 1 | 6
3 | (Spain) A Portas | 6 | 4 | 1
(Czech Republic) B Ulihrach | 4 | 6 | 6
Q | (Austria) W Schranz | 2 | 3
6 | (Spain) A Martín | 6 | 6

Quarterfinals
1 | (Argentina) M Puerta | 6 | 6
7 | (Czech Republic) M Damm | 3 | 2
(Czech Republic) B Ulihrach | 6 | 4 | 6
6 | (Spain) A Martín | 3 | 6 | 4

Semifinals
1 | (Argentina) M Puerta | 4 | 6 | 6
(Czech Republic) B Ulihrach | 6 | 2 | 3

=== Bottom half ===
First round
5 | (United States) J Tarango | 6 | 2 | 1
Q | (Italy) M Martelli | 4 | 6 | 6
(Czech Republic) T Zíb | 3 | 2
Q | (Spain) R Carretero | 6 | 6
(Argentina) H Gumy | 7 | 2 | 4
(Costa Rica) JA Marín | 5 | 6 | 6
Q | (Croatia) I Vajda | 3 | 1
4 | (Spain) C Moyá | 6 | 6
8 | (Spain) G Blanco | 7 | 6
(Czech Republic) M Tabara | 5 | 4
(Spain) D Sánchez | 6 | 6
(Armenia) S Sargsian | 3 | 4
(Spain) G Puentes | 6 | 3 | 6
(Spain) F Mantilla | 3 | 6 | 3
(Slovakia) J Krošlák | 3 | 1
2 | (Chile) M Ríos | 6 | 6

Second round
Q | (Italy) M Martelli | 2 | 3
Q | (Spain) R Carretero | 6 | 6
(Costa Rica) JA Marín | 3 | 3
4 | (Spain) C Moyá | 6 | 6
8 | (Spain) G Blanco | 1 | 4
(Spain) D Sánchez | 6 | 6
(Spain) G Puentes | 3 | 2
2 | (Chile) M Ríos | 6 | 6

Quarterfinals
Q | (Spain) R Carretero | 7 | 3 | 4
4 | (Spain) C Moyá | 5 | 6 | 6
(Spain) D Sánchez | 6^{6} | 2
2 | (Chile) M Ríos | 7^{8} | 6

Semifinals
4 | (Spain) C Moyá | 2 | 5
2 | (Chile) M Ríos | 6 | 7
