= 1997 Chevrolet Cup – Doubles =

Doubles
- 1997 Movistar Open

Final
- Champions: (Netherlands) Hendrik Jan Davids (Australia) Andrew Kratzmann
- Runners-up: (Spain) Julián Alonso (Ecuador) Nicolás Lapentti
- Score: 7–6, 5–7, 6–4

Events
Singles	Doubles
← 1996 ·	Movistar Open	· 1998 →

Gustavo Kuerten and Fernando Meligeni were the defending champions, but Kuerten did not participate this year. Meligeni partnered Luis Lobo, losing in the quarterfinals.

Hendrik Jan Davids and Andrew Kratzmann won the title, defeating Julián Alonso and Nicolás Lapentti 7–6, 5–7, 6–4 in the final.

== Seeds ==
1. (United States) Donald Johnson / (United States) Francisco Montana (first round)
2. (Argentina) Luis Lobo / (Brazil) Fernando Meligeni (quarterfinals)
3. (Argentina) Lucas Arnold / (Argentina) Daniel Orsanic (semifinals)
4. (Netherlands) Hendrik Jan Davids / (Australia) Andrew Kratzmann (champions)

== Draw ==
=== Key ===
- Q = Qualifier
- WC = Wild card
- LL = Lucky loser
- Alt = Alternate
- SE = Special exempt
- PR = Protected ranking
- ITF = ITF entry
- JE = Junior exempt
- w/o = Walkover
- r = Retired
- d = Defaulted
- SR = Special ranking

=== Draw ===
First round
1	(United States) D Johnson (United States) F Montana	3	4
(Spain) J Alonso (Ecuador) N Lapentti	6	6
WC	(Spain) J Díaz (Spain) Á López Morón	4	6	4
(United States) M Keil (United States) TJ Middleton	6	3	6
3	(Argentina) L Arnold (Argentina) D Orsanic	7	6
(Argentina) M Hood (Argentina) S Prieto	5	2
WC	(Chile) N Massú (Chile) M Ríos	6	6
Q	(Argentina) M Rodríguez (Brazil) A Sá	3	2
(United States) D Bowen (Romania) D Pescariu	4	2
(United States) B Coupe (South Africa) P Rosner	6	6
WC	(Chile) Francisco Ruiz (Chile) G Silberstein	6	1	3
4	(Netherlands) HJ Davids (Australia) A Kratzmann	4	6	6
(Spain) A Martín (Mexico) D Roditi	6	5	3
(Netherlands) T Nijssen (Czech Republic) T Anzari	4	7	6
(United States) K Kinnear (United States) G Van Emburgh	2	5
2	(Argentina) L Lobo (Brazil) F Meligeni	6	7

Quarterfinals
(Spain) J Alonso (Ecuador) N Lapentti	4	7	7
(United States) M Keil (United States) TJ Middleton	6	6	6
3	(Argentina) L Arnold (Argentina) D Orsanic	4	6	6
WC	(Chile) N Massú (Chile) M Ríos	6	3	4
(United States) B Coupe (South Africa) P Rosner	3	6	3
4	(Netherlands) HJ Davids (Australia) A Kratzmann	6	3	6
(Netherlands) T Nijssen (Czech Republic) T Anzari	4	6	6
2	(Argentina) L Lobo (Brazil) F Meligeni	6	3	2

Semifinals
(Spain) J Alonso (Ecuador) N Lapentti	4	7	7
3	(Argentina) L Arnold (Argentina) D Orsanic	6	6	5
4	(Netherlands) HJ Davids (Australia) A Kratzmann	7	6
(Netherlands) T Nijssen (Czech Republic) T Anzari	6	2

Final
(Spain) J Alonso (Ecuador) N Lapentti	6	7	4
4	(Netherlands) HJ Davids (Australia) A Kratzmann	7	5	6
