= 2000 Croatia Open =

- Date: 17–23 July
- Edition: 11th
- Category: International Series
- Draw: 32S / 16D
- Prize money: $375,000
- Surface: Clay / outdoor
- Location: Umag, Croatia

Champions

Singles
- (Chile) Marcelo Ríos

Doubles
- (Spain) Álex López Morón / (Spain) Albert Portas
← 1999 ·	Croatia Open	· 2001 →

The 2000 Croatia Open, also known as the International Championship of Croatia, was a men's tennis tournament played on outdoor clay courts in Umag, Croatia that was part of the International Series of the 2000 ATP Tour. It was the 11th edition of the tournament and was held from 17 July until 23 July 2000. Second-seeded Marcelo Ríos won the singles title.

== Finals ==
=== Singles ===
(Chile) Marcelo Ríos defeated (Argentina) Mariano Puerta, 7–6^{(7–1)}, 4–6, 6–3

- It was Ríos' 1st singles title of the year and the 16th of his career.

=== Doubles ===
(Spain) Álex López Morón / (Spain) Albert Portas defeated (Croatia) Ivan Ljubičić / (Croatia) Lovro Zovko, 6–1, 3–6, 6–3

== See also ==
- 2000 Croatian Bol Ladies Open
