= 1996 Hellmann's Cup – Doubles =

Doubles
- 1996 Hellmann's Cup

Final
- Champions: (Brazil) Gustavo Kuerten; (Brazil) Fernando Meligeni
- Runners-up: (Romania) Dinu Pescariu; (Spain) Albert Portas
- Score: 6–4, 6–2

Details
- Draw: 16
- Seeds: 4

Events
Singles	Doubles
← 1995 ·	Hellmann's Cup	· 1997 →

Jiří Novák and David Rikl were the defending champions but did not compete that year.

Gustavo Kuerten and Fernando Meligeni won in the final 6–4, 6–2 against Dinu Pescariu and Albert Portas.

== Seeds ==
1. (Argentina) Pablo Albano / (Argentina) Lucas Arnold (quarterfinals)
2. (Sweden) Rikard Bergh / (United States) Greg Van Emburgh (quarterfinals)
3. (Hungary) Gábor Köves / (Argentina) Daniel Orsanic (semifinals)
4. (Ecuador) Nicolás Lapentti / (France) Fabrice Santoro (quarterfinals)

== Draw ==
=== Key ===
- Q = Qualifier
- WC = Wild card
- LL = Lucky loser
- Alt = Alternate
- SE = Special exempt
- PR = Protected ranking
- ITF = ITF entry
- JE = Junior exempt
- w/o = Walkover
- r = Retired
- d = Defaulted
- SR = Special ranking

First round

Quarterfinals

Semifinals

Final

1
- (Argentina) P Albano
- (Argentina) L Arnold
6
7

WC
- (Spain) A Berasategui
- (Spain) F Mantilla
2
5

1
- (Argentina) P Albano
- (Argentina) L Arnold
4
4

- (Argentina) M Hood
- (Argentina) S Prieto
6
6

- (Argentina) M Hood
- (Argentina) S Prieto
6
6

- (Spain) E Benfele Álvarez
- (Chile) S Cortes
4
4

- (Argentina) M Hood
- (Argentina) S Prieto
4
6

4
- (Ecuador) N Lapentti
- (France) F Santoro
4
6
6

- (Brazil) G Kuerten
- (Brazil) F Meligeni
6
7

WC
- (Uruguay) M Filippini
- (Chile) G Silberstein
6
1
2

4
- (Ecuador) N Lapentti
- (France) F Santoro
3
4

WC
- (Chile) F Ruiz
- (Peru) A Venero
2
5

- (Brazil) G Kuerten
- (Brazil) F Meligeni
6
6

- (Brazil) G Kuerten
- (Brazil) F Meligeni
6
7

- (Brazil) G Kuerten
- (Brazil) F Meligeni
6
6

- (Argentina) M Charpentier
- (Puerto Rico) J Frontera
3
6
5

- (Romania) D Pescariu
- (Spain) A Portas
4
2

- (Mexico) A Hernández
- (Mexico) Ó Ortiz
6
3
7

- (Mexico) A Hernández
- (Mexico) Ó Ortiz
6
4
4

- (Argentina) D del Río
- (Argentina) M Rodríguez
6
5
4

3
- (Hungary) G Köves
- (Argentina) D Orsanic
1
6
6

3
- (Hungary) G Köves
- (Argentina) D Orsanic
2
7
6

3
- (Hungary) G Köves
- (Argentina) D Orsanic
2
2

- (Romania) D Pescariu
- (Spain) A Portas
6
7

- (Romania) D Pescariu
- (Spain) A Portas
6
6

Q
- (Chile) R Gamonal
- (Lebanon) J Zaatini
4
5

- (Romania) D Pescariu
- (Spain) A Portas
7
3
6

- (Venezuela) N Pereira
- (Chile) M Ríos
4
6
2

2
- (Sweden) R Bergh
- (United States) G Van Emburgh
6
6
0

2
- (Sweden) R Bergh
- (United States) G Van Emburgh
6
2
6
