= 2001 Chevrolet Cup – Singles =

Singles
- 2001 Chevrolet Cup

Final
- Champion: (Argentina) Guillermo Coria
- Runner-up: (Argentina) Gastón Gaudio
- Score: 4–6, 6–2, 7–5

Details
- Draw: 32
- Seeds: 8

Events
Singles	Doubles
← 2000 ·	Chevrolet Cup	· 2002 →

Gustavo Kuerten was the defending champion but did not compete that year.

Guillermo Coria won in the final 4–6, 6–2, 7–5 against Gastón Gaudio.

== Seeds ==
1. (Argentina) Franco Squillari (second round)
2. (Chile) Marcelo Ríos (first round)
3. (Argentina) Gastón Gaudio (final)
4. (Spain) Fernando Vicente (first round)
5. (Spain) Francisco Clavet (quarterfinals)
6. (Morocco) Hicham Arazi (second round)
7. (Spain) Álex Calatrava (second round)
8. (Argentina) Juan Ignacio Chela (first round)

== Draw ==
=== Key ===
- Q = Qualifier
- WC = Wild card
- LL = Lucky loser
- Alt = Alternate
- ITF = ITF entry
- PR = Protected ranking
- SR = Special ranking
- SE = Special exempt
- JE = Junior exempt
- JR = Junior Accelerator Programme entrant
- CO = College Accelerator Programme entrant
- NG = Next Gen Accelerator Program entrant
- w/o = Walkover
- r = Retired
- d = Defaulted

=== Finals ===
Semifinals
(Argentina) Mariano Zabaleta	6	3	1
(Argentina) Guillermo Coria	4	6	6
3	(Argentina) Gastón Gaudio	6	2	6
(Spain) Albert Portas	2	6	3

Final
(Argentina) Guillermo Coria	4	6	7
3	(Argentina) Gastón Gaudio	6	2	5

=== Top half ===
First round
1	(Argentina) F Squillari	6	6^{5}	7^{7}
(Belgium) C Rochus	3	7^{7}	6^{0}
(Spain) G Puentes	4	2
(Argentina) M Zabaleta	6	6
(Spain) S Bruguera	6	6^{2}	6^{6}
(Spain) A Martín	4	7^{7}	7^{8}
(Germany) M Hantschk	3	3
6	(Morocco) H Arazi	6	6
4	(Spain) F Vicente	6^{2}	6	3
(Germany) D Elsner	7^{7}	1	6
WC	(Chile) A García	3	3
Q	(Spain) F López	6	6
(Argentina) A Calleri	3	4
(Argentina) G Coria	6	6
(France) A Di Pasquale	6^{5}	0
7	(Spain) Á Calatrava	7^{7}	6

Second round
1	(Argentina) F Squillari	3	3
(Argentina) M Zabaleta	6	6
(Spain) A Martín	6	6
6	(Morocco) H Arazi	2	1
(Germany) D Elsner	5	1
Q	(Spain) F López	7	6
(Argentina) G Coria	6	6
7	(Spain) Á Calatrava	4	4

Quarterfinals
(Argentina) M Zabaleta	6	6
(Spain) A Martín	4	1
Q	(Spain) F López	7^{7}	2	5
(Argentina) G Coria	6^{5}	6	7

Semifinals
(Argentina) M Zabaleta	6	3	1
(Argentina) G Coria	4	6	6

=== Bottom half ===
First round
5	(Spain) F Clavet	6	2
(Chile) N Massú	3	1^{r}
WC	(Chile) F González	4	6	7^{7}
WC	(Spain) T Robredo	6	3	6^{4}
Q	(Spain) G Blanco	6	6
(Australia) R Fromberg	4	4
(Morocco) Y El Aynaoui	4	3
3	(Argentina) G Gaudio	6	6
8	(Argentina) J I Chela	2	1
(Spain) A Portas	6	6
(Spain) D Sánchez	6	6
Q	(Argentina) P Arquez	0	1
(Spain) F Mantilla	3	2
Q	(Argentina) D Nalbandian	6	6
(Morocco) K Alami	7^{7}	6
2	(Chile) M Ríos	6^{1}	2

Second round
5	(Spain) F Clavet	6	5	7
WC	(Chile) F González	0	7	5
Q	(Spain) G Blanco	2	6^{4}
3	(Argentina) G Gaudio	6	7^{7}
(Spain) A Portas	6	6
(Spain) D Sánchez	4	3
Q	(Argentina) D Nalbandian	7	6
(Morocco) K Alami	5	1

Quarterfinals
5	(Spain) F Clavet	1	0
3	(Argentina) G Gaudio	6	6
(Spain) A Portas	6	6
Q	(Argentina) D Nalbandian	3	4

Semifinals
3	(Argentina) G Gaudio	6	2	6
(Spain) A Portas	2	6	3
