= 1996 Panasonic German Open – Singles =

Singles
- 1996 Panasonic German Open

Final
- Champion: (Spain) Roberto Carretero
- Runner-up: (Spain) Àlex Corretja
- Score: 2–6, 6–4, 6–4, 6–4

Details
- Draw: 56
- Seeds: 16

Events
Singles	Doubles
← 1995 ·	German Open Tennis Championships	· 1997 →

Qualifier Roberto Carretero defeated Àlex Corretja in the final, 2–6, 6–4, 6–4, 6–4 to win the singles tennis title at the 1996 Hamburg European Open.

Andriy Medvedev was the defending champion, but lost in the second round to Jordi Burillo.

== Seeds ==
A champion seed is indicated in bold text while text in italics indicates the round in which that seed was eliminated. The top eight seeds received a bye to the second round.

1. (Germany) Boris Becker (third round)
2. (Croatia) Goran Ivanišević (second round)
3. (Russia) Yevgeny Kafelnikov (semifinals)
4. (South Africa) Wayne Ferreira (quarterfinals)
5. (Chile) Marcelo Ríos (semifinals)
6. (Spain) Sergi Bruguera (quarterfinals)
7. (France) Arnaud Boetsch (third round)
8. (Switzerland) Marc Rosset (third round)
9. (Spain) Albert Costa (second round)
10. (United States) MaliVai Washington (second round)
11. (Ukraine) Andriy Medvedev (second round)
12. (France) Cédric Pioline (second round)
13. (Netherlands) Jan Siemerink (first round)
14. (Netherlands) Richard Krajicek (third round)
15. (Spain) Carlos Costa (first round, retired)
16. (Austria) Gilbert Schaller (quarterfinals)

== Draw ==
=== Key ===
- Q = Qualifier
- WC = Wild card
- LL = Lucky loser
- Alt = Alternate
- ITF = ITF entry
- PR = Protected ranking
- SR = Special ranking
- SE = Special exempt
- JE = Junior exempt
- JR = Junior Accelerator Programme entrant
- CO = College Accelerator Programme entrant
- NG = Next Gen Accelerator Program entrant
- w/o = Walkover
- r = Retired
- d = Defaulted

=== Finals ===
Semifinals
Q	(Spain) **Roberto Carretero**	**7**	**6**
3	(Russia) Yevgeny Kafelnikov	5	2
5	(Chile) Marcelo Ríos	4	4
(Spain) **Àlex Corretja**	**6**	**6**

Final
Q	(Spain) **Roberto Carretero**	2	**6**	**6**	**6**
(Spain) Àlex Corretja	**6**	4	4	4

=== Top half ===
==== Section 1 ====
First round
Q	(Spain) **E Benfele Álvarez**	**7**	**7^{12}**
WC	(Germany) N Kiefer	5	6^{10}
Q	(Russia) **A Olhovskiy**	**6**	6^{2}	**7^{9}**
(The Bahamas) M Knowles	3	**7^{7}**	6^{7}
Q	(Spain) V Sendin	2	0
16	(Austria) **G Schaller**	**6**	**6**
10	(United States) **M Washington**	**7**	**6**
(Spain) F Clavet	5	2
(Spain) J Arrese	3	**7**	6^{2}
Q	(Spain) **R Carretero**	**6**	5	**7^{7}**
(Germany) **B Karbacher**	**6**	**6**
(Czech Republic) B Ulihrach	4	1

Second round
1	(Germany) **B Becker**	**6**	3	**6**
Q	(Spain) E Benfele Álvarez	2	**6**	3
Q	(Russia) A Olhovskiy	5	**6**	6^{7}
16	(Austria) **G Schaller**	**7**	3	**7^{9}**
10	(United States) M Washington	1	0
Q	(Spain) **R Carretero**	**6**	**6**
(Germany) B Karbacher	**6**	5	6^{4}
7	(France) **A Boetsch**	4	**7**	**7^{7}**

Third round
1	(Germany) B Becker	2	2
16	(Austria) **G Schaller**	**6**	**6**
Q	(Spain) **R Carretero**	**6**	**6**
7	(France) A Boetsch	4	1

Quarterfinals
16	(Austria) G Schaller	**6**	4	4
Q	(Spain) **R Carretero**	4	**6**	**6**

==== Section 2 ====
First round
(Italy) **S Pescosolido**	6^{8}	**6**	**7^{7}**
WC	(France) G Forget	**7^{10}**	4	6^{0}
(Netherlands) S Schalken	3	4
(Spain) **C Moyá**	**6**	**6**
(Argentina) **H Gumy**	**6**	6^{5}	**6**
13	(Netherlands) J Siemerink	4	**7^{7}**	3
11	(Ukraine) **A Medvedev**	**6**	**7**
(Spain) T Carbonell	2	5
(Spain) **J Burillo**	3	**6**	**7^{7}**
(Netherlands) P Haarhuis	**6**	4	6^{4}
Q	(Spain) **F Roig**	**6**	**7**
(Japan) S Matsuoka	1	5

Second round
3	(Russia) **Y Kafelnikov**	**6**	**7^{7}**
(Italy) S Pescosolido	2	6^{2}
(Spain) **C Moyá**	**6**	**6**
(Argentina) H Gumy	4	4
11	(Ukraine) A Medvedev	3	4
(Spain) **J Burillo**	**6**	**6**
Q	(Spain) F Roig	2	5
6	(Spain) **S Bruguera**	**6**	**7**

Third round
3	(Russia) **Y Kafelnikov**	**6**	2	**6**
(Spain) C Moyá	3	**6**	4
(Spain) J Burillo	2	6^{5}
6	(Spain) **S Bruguera**	**6**	**7^{7}**

Quarterfinals
3	(Russia) **Y Kafelnikov**	**6**	**7^{7}**
6	(Spain) S Bruguera	2	6^{5}

=== Bottom half ===
==== Section 3 ====
First round
(Romania) **A Voinea**	**6**	**6**
(Germany) D Prinosil	4	3
(Slovakia) K Kučera	4	4
(Czech Republic) **C Doseděl**	**6**	**6**
(Spain) J Sánchez	4	1
12	(France) **C Pioline**	**6**	**6**
14	(Netherlands) **R Krajicek**	**7^{7}**	2	**6**
Q	(Germany) M Zillner	6^{4}	**6**	1
(Germany) **M-K Goellner**	6^{7}	**6**	**6**
(Czech Republic) D Rikl	**7^{9}**	4	0
(Czech Republic) **D Vacek**	**6**	**6**
(Germany) H Dreekmann	3	2

Second round
5	(Chile) **M Ríos**	**6**	**6**
(Romania) A Voinea	2	1
(Czech Republic) **C Doseděl**	**7**	**6**
12	(France) C Pioline	5	1
14	(Netherlands) **R Krajicek**	6^{3}	**7^{7}**	**6**
(Germany) M-K Goellner	**7^{7}**	6^{5}	4
(Czech Republic) D Vacek	2	0
4	(South Africa) **W Ferreira**	**6**	**6**

Third round
5	(Chile) **M Ríos**	**6**	**6**
(Czech Republic) C Doseděl	3	4
14	(Netherlands) R Krajicek	4	3
4	(South Africa) **W Ferreira**	**6**	**6**

Quarterfinals
5	(Chile) **M Ríos**	3	**6**	**6**
4	(South Africa) W Ferreira	**6**	4	4

==== Section 4 ====
First round
(Switzerland) J Hlasek	3	4
WC	(Germany) **O Gross**	**6**	**6**
(Russia) A Volkov	4	5
(Spain) **À Corretja**	**6**	**7**
WC	(Germany) P Kühnen	3	0
9	(Spain) **A Costa**	**6**	**6**
15	(Spain) C Costa	3	1^{r}
(Spain) **A Berasategui**	**6**	4
(Sweden) **M Larsson**	**6**	**6**
WC	(Germany) J Renzenbrink	4	2
(Germany) **C-U Steeb**	**6**	**6**
Q	(Finland) K Tiilikainen	4	3

Second round
8	(Switzerland) **M Rosset**	**6**	**6**
WC	(Germany) O Gross	2	1
(Spain) **À Corretja**	**6**	**6**
9	(Spain) A Costa	2	1
(Spain) A Berasategui	6^{5}	**7**	4
(Sweden) **M Larsson**	**7^{7}**	5	**6**
(Germany) **C-U Steeb**	**6**	**6**
2	(Croatia) G Ivanišević	3	4

Third round
8	(Switzerland) M Rosset	3	2
(Spain) **À Corretja**	**6**	**6**
(Sweden) **M Larsson**	**6**	**6**
(Germany) C-U Steeb	2	0

Quarterfinals
(Spain) **À Corretja**	**6**	**6**
(Sweden) M Larsson	2	0
