= 2000 Chevrolet Cup – Singles =

Singles
- 2000 Chevrolet Cup

Final
- Champion: (Brazil) Gustavo Kuerten
- Runner-up: (Argentina) Mariano Puerta
- Score: 7–6^{(7–3)}, 6–3

Details
- Draw: 32
- Seeds: 8

Events
Singles	Doubles
← 1998 ·	Chile Open	· 2001 →

Gustavo Kuerten won the title, defeating Mariano Puerta 7–6^{(7–3)}, 6–3 in the final.

== Seeds ==
1. (Brazil) Gustavo Kuerten (champion)
2. (Chile) Marcelo Ríos (first round)
3. (Brazil) Fernando Meligeni (first round, retired)
4. (Spain) Fernando Vicente (quarterfinals)
5. (Argentina) Franco Squillari (first round)
6. (France) Arnaud Di Pasquale (first round)
7. (Armenia) Sargis Sargsian (first round)
8. (Argentina) Gastón Gaudio (semifinals)

== Draw ==
=== Key ===
- Q = Qualifier
- WC = Wild card
- LL = Lucky loser
- Alt = Alternate
- SE = Special exempt
- PR = Protected ranking
- ITF = ITF entry
- JE = Junior exempt
- w/o = Walkover
- r = Retired
- d = Defaulted
- SR = Special ranking

=== Finals ===
Semifinals
1	(Brazil) Gustavo Kuerten	6	7^{8}
(Spain) Albert Portas	4	6^{6}
(Argentina) Mariano Puerta	3	6	6
8	(Argentina) Gastón Gaudio	6	4	2

Final
1	(Brazil) Gustavo Kuerten	7^{7}	6
(Argentina) Mariano Puerta	6^{3}	3

=== Top half ===
First round
1	(Brazil) G Kuerten	7	6
(Monaco) J-R Lisnard	5	1
(Bulgaria) O Stanoytchev	6	6
(Germany) M Hantschk	3	4
(Spain) J Díaz	7	1	3
Q	(Spain) E Benfele Álvarez	5	6	6
Q	(Argentina) A Calleri	6	6
7	(Armenia) S Sargsian	4	4
3	(Brazil) F Meligeni	6^{4}	0^{r}
(Chile) N Massú	7^{7}	1
WC	(Spain) S Bruguera	6^{7}	4
Q	(Argentina) M Hood	7^{9}	6
(Italy) D Sanguinetti	2	3
(Spain) A Portas	6	6
(Argentina) G Cañas	3	6	6
6	(France) A Di Pasquale	6	1	4

Second round
1	(Brazil) G Kuerten	6	6
(Bulgaria) O Stanoytchev	3	4
Q	(Spain) E Benfele Álvarez	7^{8}	3	6^{4}
Q	(Argentina) A Calleri	6^{6}	6	7^{7}
(Chile) N Massú	1	2
Q	(Argentina) M Hood	6	6
(Spain) A Portas	6	6
(Argentina) G Cañas	4	4

Quarterfinals
1	(Brazil) G Kuerten	6	6
Q	(Argentina) A Calleri	4	1
Q	(Argentina) M Hood	4	4
(Spain) A Portas	6	6

Semifinals
1	(Brazil) G Kuerten	6	7^{8}
(Spain) A Portas	4	6^{6}

=== Bottom half ===
First round
5	(Argentina) F Squillari	2	2
(Argentina) M Puerta	6	6
(Costa Rica) J A Marín	4	2
SE	(Argentina) J I Chela	6	6
(Spain) Á López Morón	6^{4}	4
(Czech Republic) T Zíb	7^{7}	6
(Argentina) M Rodríguez	4	6	2
4	(Spain) F Vicente	6	4	6
8	(Argentina) G Gaudio	6	7^{7}
Q	(Austria) M Spöttl	4	6^{4}
WC	(Chile) A García	6	7^{7}
(Spain) G Blanco	1	6^{4}
WC	(Chile) F González	3	6	6^{4}
(Haiti) R Agénor	6	3	7^{7}
(Czech Republic) B Ulihrach	6	7^{7}
2	(Chile) M Ríos	4	6^{3}

Second round
(Argentina) M Puerta	6	2	6
SE	(Argentina) J I Chela	3	6	3
(Czech Republic) T Zíb	2	2
4	(Spain) F Vicente	6	6
8	(Argentina) G Gaudio	7	7^{7}
WC	(Chile) A García	5	6^{5}
(Haiti) R Agénor	3	6	3
(Czech Republic) B Ulihrach	6	1	6

Quarterfinals
(Argentina) M Puerta	6	7
4	(Spain) F Vicente	1	5
8	(Argentina) G Gaudio	6	6
(Czech Republic) B Ulihrach	2	2

Semifinals
(Argentina) M Puerta	3	6	6
8	(Argentina) G Gaudio	6	4	2
