= 1997 Chevrolet Cup =

- Date: 3–10 November
- Edition: 5th
- Category: World Series
- Draw: 32S / 16D
- Prize money: $303,000
- Surface: Clay / outdoor
- Location: Santiago, Chile

Champions

Singles
- (Spain) Julián Alonso

Doubles
- (Netherlands) Hendrik Jan Davids / (Australia) Andrew Kratzmann
- Chile Open

The 1997 Chevrolet Cup was a men's ATP tournament held in Santiago, Chile on outdoor clay courts that was part of the World Series of the 1997 ATP Tour. It was the fifth edition of the tournament and was held from 3 November until 10 November 1997. Fourth-seeded Julián Alonso won the singles title.

== Finals ==
=== Singles ===
(Spain) Julián Alonso defeated (Chile) Marcelo Ríos 6–2, 6–1

- It was Alonso's 2nd title of the year and the 2nd of his career.

=== Doubles ===
(Netherlands) Hendrik Jan Davids / (Australia) Andrew Kratzmann defeated (Spain) Julián Alonso / (Ecuador) Nicolás Lapentti 7–6, 5–7, 6–4

- It was Davids's only title of the year and the 7th of his career. It was Kratzmann's 1st title of the year and the 5th of his career.
