= 2002 Allianz Suisse Open Gstaad – Singles =

Tennis tournament

Singles
- 2002 Allianz Suisse Open Gstaad

Final
- Champion: (Spain) Àlex Corretja
- Runner-up: (Argentina) Gastón Gaudio
- Score: 6–3, 7–6^{(7–3)}, 7–6^{(7–3)}

Details
- Draw: 32 (3WC/4Q)
- Seeds: 8

Events
Singles	Doubles
- Swiss Open

Jiří Novák was the defending champion but did not compete that year.

Àlex Corretja won in the final 6–3, 7–6^{(7–3)}, 7–6^{(7–3)} against Gastón Gaudio.

== Seeds ==
A champion seed is indicated in bold while text in italics indicates the round in which that seed was eliminated.

1. (Spain) Albert Costa (first round)
2. (Spain) Juan Carlos Ferrero (second round)
3. (Switzerland) Roger Federer (second round)
4. (Romania) Andrei Pavel (second round)
5. (Argentina) Juan Ignacio Chela (first round)
6. (Ecuador) Nicolás Lapentti (first round)
7. (Argentina) Gastón Gaudio (final)
8. (Spain) **Àlex Corretja (champion)**

== Draw ==
Key

- Q = Qualifier
- WC = Wild card
- LL = Lucky loser
- Alt = Alternate
- ITF = ITF entry
- PR = Protected ranking
- SR = Special ranking
- SE = Special exempt
- JE = Junior exempt
- JR = Junior Accelerator Programme entrant
- CO = College Accelerator Programme entrant
- NG = Next Gen Accelerator Program entrant
- w/o = Walkover
- r = Retired
- d = Defaulted
- NB: The Final was the best of 5 sets while all other rounds were the best of 3 sets.

=== Final ===
Final
7	(Argentina) Gastón Gaudio	3	6^{3}	6^{3}
8	(Spain) **Àlex Corretja**	**6**	**7^{7}**	**7^{7}**

=== Section 1 ===
First round
1	(Spain) A Costa	4	3
Q	(France) **P-H Mathieu**	**6**	**6**
(Spain) **G Blanco**	**7**	**6**
Q	(Netherlands) R Wassen	5	1
(Austria) **S Koubek**	**7^{7}**	**6**
Q	(Argentina) N Todero	6^{2}	2
(Croatia) **I Ljubičić**	**7^{7}**	3	**6**
5	(Argentina) J I Chela	6^{5}	**6**	4
4	(Romania) **A Pavel**	**7**	**6**
(Argentina) D Nalbandian	5	3
WC	(Switzerland) G Bastl	6^{5}	**6**	3
WC	(Switzerland) **M Rosset**	**7^{7}**	3	**6**
(Switzerland) M Kratochvil	2	4
(Russia) **M Youzhny**	**6**	**6**
(Argentina) F Squillari	**6**	1	4
7	(Argentina) **G Gaudio**	2	**6**	**6**

Second round
Q	(France) P-H Mathieu	5	6^{1}
(Spain) **G Blanco**	**7**	**7^{7}**
(Austria) S Koubek	4	4
(Croatia) **I Ljubičić**	**6**	**6**
4	(Romania) A Pavel	5	6^{1}	**6**
WC	(Switzerland) **M Rosset**	**7**	**7^{7}**
(Russia) M Youzhny	6^{3}	4
7	(Argentina) **G Gaudio**	**7^{7}**	**6**

Quarterfinals
(Spain) G Blanco	3	**7^{12}**	4
(Croatia) **I Ljubičić**	**6**	6^{10}	**6**
WC	(Switzerland) M Rosset	3	6^{3}
7	(Argentina) **G Gaudio**	**6**	**7^{7}**

Semifinals
(Croatia) I Ljubičić	**6**	4	6^{2}
7	(Argentina) **G Gaudio**	4	**6**	**7^{7}**

=== Section 2 ===
First round
6	(Ecuador) N Lapentti	5	**6**	5
(Hungary) **A Sávolt**	**7**	1	**7**
WC	(Switzerland) I Heuberger	**6**	2	5
(Slovakia) **K Kučera**	4	**6**	**7**
Q	(Czech Republic) **R Štěpánek**	**6**	**6**
(Spain) F Clavet	3	3
(Morocco) H Arazi	4	3
3	(Switzerland) **R Federer**	**6**	**6**
8	(Spain) **À Corretja**	**6**	**6**
(Brazil) F Meligeni	1	4
(Spain) **F Mantilla**	**6**	**6**
(Romania) A Voinea	3	4
(Spain) **D Sánchez**	**6**	**6**
(France) A Dupuis	2	1
(Spain) A Martín	2	2
2	(Spain) **J C Ferrero**	**6**	**6**

Second round
(Hungary) **A Sávolt**	**6**	3	**7**
(Slovakia) K Kučera	3	**6**	5
Q	(Czech Republic) **R Štěpánek**	3	**6**	**6**
3	(Switzerland) R Federer	**6**	3	2
8	(Spain) **À Corretja**	**6**	**6**
(Spain) F Mantilla	4	4
(Spain) **D Sánchez**	5	**6**	**6**
2	(Spain) J C Ferrero	**7**	4	3

Quarterfinals
(Hungary) A Sávolt	5	2
Q	(Czech Republic) **R Štěpánek**	**7**	**6**
8	(Spain) **À Corretja**	**6**	**6**
(Spain) D Sánchez	3	3

Semifinals
Q	(Czech Republic) R Štěpánek	5	1
8	(Spain) **À Corretja**	**7**	**6**

== Qualifying ==
=== Qualifying seeds ===
1. (France) **Paul-Henri Mathieu (qualified)**
2. (France) Cédric Pioline (second round)
3. (Uzbekistan) Vadim Kutsenko (second round)
4. (Czech Republic) **Radek Štěpánek (qualified)**
5. (Spain) Rubén Ramírez Hidalgo (qualifying competition)
6. (Italy) Renzo Furlan (qualifying competition)
7. (Italy) Federico Luzzi (first round)
8. (Croatia) Lovro Zovko (second round)

=== Qualifiers ===
1. (France) **Paul-Henri Mathieu**
2. (Netherlands) **Rogier Wassen**
3. (Argentina) **Nicolás Todero**
4. (Czech Republic) **Radek Štěpánek**

=== Qualifying draw ===
==== First qualifier ====
First round
1	**(France) Paul-Henri Mathieu**	5	**6**	**7**
(Spain) Emilio Benfele Álvarez	**7**	4	5
(Australia) Paul Baccanello	**6**	4	6^{7}
WC	**(Switzerland) Stéphane Bohli**	4	**6**	**7^{9}**
**(Chile) Hermes Gamonal**	**7**	**6**
(Switzerland) Roman Valent	5	4
WC	(Switzerland) Jean-Claude Scherrer	3	6^{6}
5	**(Spain) Rubén Ramírez Hidalgo**	**6**	**7^{8}**

Second round
1	**(France) Paul-Henri Mathieu**	**6**	**6**
WC	(Switzerland) Stéphane Bohli	2	3
(Chile) Hermes Gamonal	1	4
5	**(Spain) Rubén Ramírez Hidalgo**	**6**	**6**

Qualifying competition
1	**(France) Paul-Henri Mathieu**	**6**	**6**
5	(Spain) Rubén Ramírez Hidalgo	4	2

==== Second qualifier ====
First round
2	**(France) Cédric Pioline**	**6**	**6**
(Italy) Vincenzo Santopadre	3	2
**(Netherlands) Rogier Wassen**	**6**	4	**7^{9}**
(Italy) Leonardo Azzaro	3	**6**	6^{7}
(Italy) Marzio Martelli	5	**6**	5
**(Spain) Iván Navarro**	**7**	2	**7**
(France) Jérôme Haehnel	3	5
6	**(Italy) Renzo Furlan**	**6**	**7**

Second round
2	(France) Cédric Pioline	2	**7^{7}**	4
**(Netherlands) Rogier Wassen**	**6**	6^{4}	**6**
(Spain) Iván Navarro	6^{6}	3
6	**(Italy) Renzo Furlan**	**7^{8}**	**6**

Qualifying competition
**(Netherlands) Rogier Wassen**	**7^{9}**	5	**6**
6	(Italy) Renzo Furlan	6^{7}	**7**	4

==== Third qualifier ====
First round
3	**(Uzbekistan) Vadim Kutsenko**	**6**	**6**
WC	(Switzerland) Benjamin Rufer	2	4
**(France) Dimitri Lorin**	**6**	**7^{7}**
(Argentina) Diego Moyano	1	6^{5}
(Italy) Stefano Cobolli	3	1
**(France) Florent Serra**	**6**	**6**
**(Argentina) Nicolás Todero**	**7^{8}**	**6**
7	(Italy) Federico Luzzi	6^{6}	2

Second round
3	(Uzbekistan) Vadim Kutsenko	6^{5}	**6**	4
**(France) Dimitri Lorin**	**7^{7}**	4	**6**
(France) Florent Serra	**7^{7}**	3	5
**(Argentina) Nicolás Todero**	6^{3}	**6**	**7**

Qualifying competition
(France) Dimitri Lorin	0	3
**(Argentina) Nicolás Todero**	**6**	**6**

==== Fourth qualifier ====
First round
4	**(Czech Republic) Radek Štěpánek**	**6**	3	**6**
(Italy) Massimo Dell'Acqua	3	**6**	3
**(Italy) Stefano Pescosolido**	**6**	**6**
(Chile) Adrián García	3	2
**(Japan) Jun Kato**	**6**	**6**
Alt	(United States) Jim Thomas	4	2
WC	(Switzerland) Stanislas Wawrinka	0	4
8	**(Croatia) Lovro Zovko**	**6**	**6**

Second round
4	**(Czech Republic) Radek Štěpánek**	**6**	**6**
(Italy) Stefano Pescosolido	4	2
**(Japan) Jun Kato**	**6**	5	**7^{8}**
8	(Croatia) Lovro Zovko	1	**7**	6^{6}

Qualifying competition
4	**(Czech Republic) Radek Štěpánek**	**6**	**6**
(Japan) Jun Kato	3	4
