= 1996 Hellmann's Cup – Singles =

Singles
- 1996 Hellmann's Cup

Final
- Champion: (Argentina) Hernán Gumy
- Runner-up: (Chile) Marcelo Ríos
- Score: 6–4, 7–5

Details
- Draw: 32
- Seeds: 8

Events
Singles	Doubles
← 1995 ·	Hellmann's Cup	· 1997 →

Ctislav Doseděl was the defending champion but did not compete that year.

Hernán Gumy won in the final 6–4, 7–5 against Marcelo Ríos.

== Seeds ==
1. (Chile) Marcelo Ríos (final)
2. (Spain) Félix Mantilla (semifinals)
3. (Spain) Alberto Berasategui (semifinals)
4. (Argentina) Hernán Gumy (champion)
5. (Uruguay) Marcelo Filippini (quarterfinals)
6. (Spain) Galo Blanco (second round)
7. (Brazil) Fernando Meligeni (quarterfinals)
8. (Venezuela) Nicolás Pereira (first round)

== Draw ==
=== Key ===
- Q = Qualifier
- WC = Wild card
- LL = Lucky loser
- Alt = Alternate
- SE = Special exempt
- PR = Protected ranking
- ITF = ITF entry
- JE = Junior exempt
- w/o = Walkover
- r = Retired
- d = Defaulted
- SR = Special ranking

=== Finals ===
Semifinals
1	(Chile) Marcelo Ríos	6	6
3	(Spain) Alberto Berasategui	2	4
4	(Argentina) Hernán Gumy	7^{7}	3	6
2	(Spain) Félix Mantilla	6^{1}	6	3

Final
1	(Chile) Marcelo Ríos	4	5
4	(Argentina) Hernán Gumy	6	7

=== Top half ===
First round
1	(Chile) M Ríos	6	6
(Spain) Á López Morón	2	3
(Argentina) M Charpentier	2	1
(Argentina) M Zabaleta	6	6
(Spain) J Díaz	6	6
(Argentina) L Arnold	4	4
(France) F Santoro	3	3
7	(Brazil) F Meligeni	6	6
3	(Spain) A Berasategui	6	6
(Brazil) G Kuerten	3	2
Q	(Argentina) D del Río	3	3
WC	(Chile) G Silberstein	6	6
WC	(Chile) S Cortés	3	6	2
(Mexico) A Hernández	6	3	6
(France) G Solvès	4	6	5
5	(Uruguay) M Filippini	6	3	7

Second round
1	(Chile) M Ríos	6	7^{7}
(Argentina) M Zabaleta	3	6^{3}
(Spain) J Díaz	3	6	3
7	(Brazil) F Meligeni	6	1	6
3	(Spain) A Berasategui	6	6
WC	(Chile) G Silberstein	4	4
(Mexico) A Hernández	5	3
5	(Uruguay) M Filippini	7	6

Quarterfinals
1	(Chile) M Ríos	6	6
7	(Brazil) F Meligeni	3	2
3	(Spain) A Berasategui	3	6	6
5	(Uruguay) M Filippini	6	4	3

Semifinals
1	(Chile) M Ríos	6	6
3	(Spain) A Berasategui	2	4

=== Bottom half ===
First round
6	(Spain) G Blanco	4	6	6
Q	(Argentina) G Etlis	6	3	4
(Spain) E Benfele Álvarez	6	6
(Brazil) R Jabali	1	4
(Ecuador) N Lapentti	6	6
(Argentina) G Markus	4	4
(Colombia) M Hadad	3	3
4	(Argentina) H Gumy	6	6
WC/8	(Venezuela) N Pereira	4	4
(Ecuador) L Morejón	6	6
(Germany) O Gross	5	6	6
Q	(Argentina) M Rodríguez	7	4	2
(Ecuador) P Campana	1	1
Q	(Argentina) F Squillari	6	6
(Spain) A Portas	4	6	0
2	(Spain) F Mantilla	6	4	6

Second round
6	(Spain) G Blanco	3	4
(Spain) E Benfele Álvarez	6	6
(Ecuador) N Lapentti	4	7^{7}	6^{4}
4	(Argentina) H Gumy	6	6^{1}	7^{7}
(Ecuador) L Morejón	6	4	6^{5}
(Germany) O Gross	1	6	7^{7}
Q	(Argentina) F Squillari	6	3	3
2	(Spain) F Mantilla	4	6	6

Quarterfinals
(Spain) E Benfele Álvarez	6^{9}	6^{3}
4	(Argentina) H Gumy	7^{11}	7^{7}
(Germany) O Gross	3	4
2	(Spain) F Mantilla	6	6

Semifinals
4	(Argentina) H Gumy	7^{7}	3	6
2	(Spain) F Mantilla	6^{1}	6	3
