= 2002 BellSouth Open – Singles =

Singles
- 2002 BellSouth Open

Final
- Champion: (Chile) Fernando González
- Runner-up: (Ecuador) Nicolás Lapentti
- Score: 6–3, 6–7^{(5–7)}, 7–6^{(7–4)}

Details
- Draw: 32 (3WC/4Q)
- Seeds: 8

Events
| Singles | Doubles |
| ← 2001 · | Chile Open | · 2003 → |

Guillermo Coria was the defending champion, but could not compete this year after being banned for doping in December 2001.

Fernando González won in the final 6–3, 6–7^{(5–7)}, 7–6^{(7–4)} against Nicolás Lapentti, becoming the first Chilean player to win this tournament.

== Seeds ==
1. (Ecuador) Nicolás Lapentti (final)
2. (Spain) Félix Mantilla (second round)
3. (Spain) Alberto Martín (first round)
4. (Chile) Marcelo Ríos (first round)
5. (France) Jérôme Golmard (first round)
6. (Argentina) Gastón Gaudio (second round)
7. (Argentina) David Nalbandian (second round, defaulted due to verbal abuse)
8. (Italy) Andrea Gaudenzi (first round)

== Draw ==
=== Key ===
- Q = Qualifier
- WC = Wild card
- LL = Lucky loser
- Alt = Alternate
- SE = Special exempt
- PR = Protected ranking
- ITF = ITF entry
- JE = Junior exempt
- w/o = Walkover
- r = Retired
- d = Defaulted
- SR = Special ranking

=== Finals ===
Semifinals
1 | (Ecuador) Nicolás Lapentti | 6 | 6
(Chile) Nicolás Massú | 3 | 4
Q | (France) Nicolas Coutelot | 3 | 3
WC | (Chile) Fernando González | 6 | 6

Final
1 | (Ecuador) Nicolás Lapentti | 3 | 7^{7} | 6^{4}
WC | (Chile) Fernando González | 6 | 6^{5} | 7^{7}

=== Top half ===
First round
1 | (Ecuador) N Lapentti | 3 | 6 | 6
(Spain) J Díaz | 6 | 3 | 4
(Argentina) F Squillari | 6 | 2 | 3
(Paraguay) R Delgado | 2 | 6 | 6
Q | (Costa Rica) J A Marín | 4 | 2
(Brazil) F Saretta | 6 | 6
(Brazil) F Meligeni | 7^{10} | 1 | 1
7 | (Argentina) D Nalbandian | 6^{8} | 6 | 6
3 | (Spain) A Martín | 4 | 4
Q | (Brazil) J Silva | 6 | 6
(Chile) N Massú | 6 | 7^{7}
WC | (Sweden) M Norman | 1 | 6^{1}
(Argentina) J I Chela | 2 | 1
(Spain) F Vicente | 6 | 6
(Spain) A Montañés | 6 | 6
8 | (Italy) A Gaudenzi | 3 | 0

Second round
1 | (Ecuador) N Lapentti | 4 | 6 | 6
(Paraguay) R Delgado | 6 | 3 | 3
(Brazil) F Saretta | 3
7 | (Argentina) D Nalbandian | 4^{d}
Q | (Brazil) J Silva | 0 | 3
(Chile) N Massú | 6 | 6
(Spain) F Vicente | 6^{5} | 4
(Spain) A Montañés | 7^{7} | 6

Quarterfinals
1 | (Ecuador) N Lapentti | 3 | 6 | 7^{7}
(Brazil) F Saretta | 6 | 3 | 6^{5}
(Chile) N Massú | 6 | 6
(Spain) A Montañés | 3 | 4

Semifinals
1 | (Ecuador) N Lapentti | 6 | 6
(Chile) N Massú | 3 | 4

=== Bottom half ===
First round
6 | (Argentina) G Gaudio | 6^{6} | 6 | 7^{8}
(Spain) D Sánchez | 7^{8} | 2 | 6^{6}
(Austria) M Hipfl | 6 | 6
WC | (Chile) G Hormazábal | 1 | 3
Q | (France) N Coutelot | 6 | 6
Q | (Brazil) M Daniel | 4 | 4
(Argentina) M Zabaleta | 6 | 7^{8}
4 | (Chile) M Ríos | 4 | 6^{6}
5 | (France) J Golmard | 6^{3} | 4
(Spain) G Blanco | 7^{7} | 6
(Argentina) J Acasuso | 6 | 6
(United States) M Russell | 2 | 3
WC | (Chile) F González | 6 | 6
(Argentina) A Calleri | 4 | 0
(Hungary) A Sávolt | 4 | 5
2 | (Spain) F Mantilla | 6 | 7

Second round
6 | (Argentina) G Gaudio | 4 | 6^{4}
(Austria) M Hipfl | 6 | 7^{7}
Q | (France) N Coutelot | 3 | 6 | 7^{7}
(Argentina) M Zabaleta | 6 | 4 | 6^{4}
(Spain) G Blanco | 3 | 0
(Argentina) J Acasuso | 6 | 6
(Chile) F González | 6 | 7^{8}
2 | (Spain) F Mantilla | 1 | 6^{6}

Quarterfinals
(Austria) M Hipfl | 2 | 1
Q | (France) N Coutelot | 6 | 6
(Argentina) J Acasuso | 4 | 6^{5}
WC | (Chile) F González | 6 | 7^{7}

Semifinals
Q | (France) N Coutelot | 3 | 3
WC | (Chile) F González | 6 | 6
