= 2001 Chevrolet Cup =

- Date: February 12–18
- Edition: 8th
- Category: International Series
- Draw: 32S / 16D
- Prize money: $350,000
- Surface: Clay / outdoor
- Location: Viña del Mar, Chile

Champions

Singles
- (Argentina) Guillermo Coria

Doubles
- (Argentina) Lucas Arnold / (Spain) Tomás Carbonell
← 2000 ·	Chile Open	· 2002 →

The 2001 Chevrolet Cup was a men's tennis tournament played on outdoor clay courts in Viña del Mar in Chile and was part of the International Series of the 2001 ATP Tour. It was the eighth edition of the tournament and ran from February 12 through February 18, 2001. Guillermo Coria won the singles title.

== Finals ==
=== Singles ===
(Argentina) Guillermo Coria defeated (Argentina) Gastón Gaudio 4–6, 6–2, 7–5

- It was Coria's only title of the year and the 1st of his career.

=== Doubles ===
(Argentina) Lucas Arnold / (Spain) Tomás Carbonell defeated (Argentina) Mariano Hood / (Argentina) Sebastián Prieto 6–4, 2–6, 6–3

- It was Arnold's 1st title of the year and the 7th of his career. It was Carbonell's 1st title of the year and the 22nd of his career.
