= 1998 Chevrolet Cup =

- Date: 9–16 November
- Edition: 6th
- Category: World Series
- Draw: 32S / 16D
- Prize money: $315,000
- Surface: Clay / outdoor
- Location: Santiago, Chile

Champions

Singles
- (Spain) Francisco Clavet

Doubles
- (Argentina) Mariano Hood / (Argentina) Sebastián Prieto
- Chile Open

The 1998 Chevrolet Cup was a men's ATP tennis tournament held in Santiago, Chile and played on outdoor clay courts that was part of the World Series of the 1998 ATP Tour. It was the sixth edition of the tournament and was held from 9 November to 16 November 1998. Fifth-seeded Francisco Clavet won the singles title.

== Finals ==
=== Singles ===
(Spain) Francisco Clavet defeated (Morocco) Younes El Aynaoui 6–2, 6–4

- It was Clavet's 2nd title of the year and the 7th of his career.

=== Doubles ===
(Argentina) Mariano Hood / (Argentina) Sebastián Prieto defeated (Italy) Massimo Bertolini / (United States) Devin Bowen 7–6, 6–7, 7–6

- It was Hood's only title of the year and the 1st of his career. It was Prieto's only title of the year and the 1st of his career.
