= 1996 Hellmann's Cup =

- Date: 4–10 November
- Edition: 4th
- Category: World Series
- Draw: 32S / 16D
- Prize money: $203,000
- Surface: Clay / outdoor
- Location: Santiago, Chile

Champions

Singles
- (Argentina) Hernán Gumy

Doubles
- (Brazil) Gustavo Kuerten (Brazil) Fernando Meligeni
- Chile Open

The 1996 Hellmann's Cup was a men's tennis tournament played on outdoor clay courts in Santiago in Chile that was part of the World Series of the 1996 ATP Tour. It was the fourth edition of the tournament and ran from 4 November through 10 November 1996. Fourth-seeded Hernán Gumy won the singles title.

== Finals ==
=== Singles ===
(Argentina) Hernán Gumy defeated (Chile) Marcelo Ríos 6–4, 7–5

- It was Gumy's only title of the year and the 1st of his career.

=== Doubles ===
(Brazil) Gustavo Kuerten / (Brazil) Fernando Meligeni defeated (Romania) Dinu Pescariu / (Spain) Albert Portas 6–4, 6–2

- It was Kuerten's only title of the year and the 1st of his career. It was Meligeni's 2nd title of the year and the 3rd of his career.
