= 2002 BellSouth Open =

- Date: 11–17 February
- Edition: 9th
- Category: International Series
- Draw: 32S / 16D
- Prize money: $356,000
- Surface: Clay / outdoor
- Location: Viña del Mar, Chile

Champions

Singles
- (Chile) Fernando González

Doubles
- (Argentina) Gastón Etlis / (Argentina) Martín Rodríguez
← 2001 ·	Chile Open	· 2003 →

The 2002 BellSouth Open was a men's tennis tournament played on outdoor clay courts in Viña del Mar in Chile and was part of the International Series of the 2002 ATP Tour. It was the 9th edition of the tournament and ran from February 11 through February 17, 2002. Fernando González won the singles title. Unseeded Fernando González, who entered on a wildcard, won the singles title.

== Finals ==
=== Singles ===
(Chile) Fernando González defeated (Ecuador) Nicolás Lapentti 6–3, 6–7^{(5–7)}, 7–6^{(7–4)}

- It was González's 1st title of the year and the 2nd of his career.

=== Doubles ===
(Argentina) Gastón Etlis / (Argentina) Martín Rodríguez defeated (Argentina) Lucas Arnold / (Argentina) Luis Lobo 6–3, 6–4

- It was Etlis's 1st title of the year and the 1st of his career. It was Rodríguez's 1st title of the year and the 1st of his career.
