= Eduardo Medica =

Argentine tennis player

- Country (sports): Argentina
- Born: 10 February 1976 (age 50) Buenos Aires, Argentina
- Height: 1.80 m (5 ft 11 in)
- Turned pro: 1995
- Plays: Right-handed
- Prize money: $107,359

Singles
- Career record: 2-4
- Career titles: 0
- Highest ranking: No. 109 (26 Apr 1999)

Doubles
- Career record: 0-2
- Career titles: 0
- Highest ranking: No. 204 (11 May 1998)

Eduardo Medica (born 10 February 1976) is a former professional tennis player from Argentina.

== Career ==
Medica was coached during his career by Ruben Puerta. He won a Challenger tournament with Puerta's son, Mariano, at Cali in 1997.

The best win of his career came at the 1998 Movistar Open, in Santiago, where he defeated world number 58 Fernando Meligeni. He was eliminated in the second round by second seed Félix Mantilla. His only other second round appearance on the ATP Tour came at Casablanca in 1999.

== Challenger titles ==
=== Singles: (1) ===
No.	Year	Tournament	Surface	Opponent	Score
1.	1998	Montevideo, Uruguay	Clay	(Norway) Christian Ruud	6–4, 6–4

=== Doubles: (1) ===
No.	Year	Tournament	Surface	Partner	Opponents	Score
1.	1997	Cali, Colombia	Clay	(Argentina) Mariano Puerta	(Mexico) Bernardo Martínez (Mexico) Marco Osorio	7–6, 7–5
