= Antonio Prieto (tennis) =

Brazilian tennis player

- Full name: Antonio Prieto
- Country (sports): Brazil
- Born: 7 September 1973 (age 51); Curitiba, Brazil
- Turned pro: 1997
- Plays: Right-handed
- Prize money: $92,509
- Career record: 0–0

Doubles
- Career record: 12–21
- Career titles: 1
- Highest ranking: No. 95 (10 July 2000)

Grand Slam doubles results
- Australian Open: 1R (2001)
- French Open: 1R (2000)
- Wimbledon: 2R (2000)
- US Open: 1R (2000)

Antonio Prieto (born 7 September 1973) is a former professional tennis player from Brazil.

== Biography ==
Born in Curitiba, Prieto went to college in the United States, at Florida State University from 1994 to 1997. While studying for a business degree he played varsity tennis as the No. 1 singles player.

Prieto, who specialised in doubles, turned professional in 1997. He won an ATP Tour doubles title with countryman Gustavo Kuerten at the 2000 Chevrolet Cup, in Santiago, Chile. From the 2000 French Open to the 2001 Australian Open, Prieto appeared in the men's doubles main draw of all four Grand Slam tournaments in succession. He made the second round once, at the 2000 Wimbledon Championships with Israel's Eyal Ran.

He now runs Prieto Tennis, a tennis academy in Ecoville, Brazil.

== ATP Tour career finals ==
=== Doubles: 1 (1–0) ===
Result	No.	Year	Tournament	Surface	Partner	Opponents	Score
Winner	1.	2000	Santiago, Chile	Clay	(Brazil) Gustavo Kuerten	(South Africa) Lan Bale (South Africa) Piet Norval	6–2, 6–4

== Challenger titles ==
=== Doubles: (4) ===
No.	Year	Tournament	Surface	Partner	Opponents	Score
1.	1999	Gramado, Brazil	Hard	(Brazil) Alexandre Simoni	(Paraguay) Paulo Carvallo (Brazil) Ricardo Schlachter	6–1, 6–4
2.	1999	Belo Horizonte, Brazil	Hard	(Brazil) Daniel Melo	(United Kingdom) Jamie Delgado (United Kingdom) Martin Lee	6–2, 3–6, 7–5
3.	1999	Santiago, Chile	Clay	(Brazil) Cristiano Testa	(Spain) Germán Puentes (Spain) Álex López Morón	4–6, 6–4, 6–3
4.	2001	Ribeirão Preto, Brazil	Clay	(Brazil) Adriano Ferreira	(Argentina) Sergio Roitman (Argentina) Andrés Schneiter	6–1, 6–7, 6–4
