= Roberto Carretero =

Spanish tennis player (born 1975)

- Country (sports): Spain
- Residence: Andorra la Vella, Andorra
- Born: 30 August 1975 (age 51) Madrid, Spain
- Height: 1.78 m (5 ft 10 in)
- Turned pro: 1993
- Retired: 2001
- Plays: Right-handed (one-handed backhand)
- Coach: Marcos Górriz
- Prize money: $680,211

Singles
- Career record: 23–45
- Career titles: 1
- Highest ranking: No. 58 (13 May 1996)

Grand Slam singles results
- Australian Open: 1R (1997)
- French Open: 2R (1997)
- US Open: 2R (1996)

Doubles
- Career record: 2–6
- Career titles: 0
- Highest ranking: No. 697 (24 July 2000)
- Last updated on: 21 April 2022.

Roberto Carretero Díaz (born 30 August 1975) is a Spanish former professional tennis player. He won one singles title, the 1996 Hamburg AMS.

== Tennis career ==
Carretero, a former junior French Open Champion, shocked the tennis world by winning the Masters Series title in Hamburg in 1996 as a virtually unknown player ranked only No. 143. En route to the title he defeated two top 100 players, two top 20 players (Washington and Boetsch), and most notably, Yevgeny Kafelnikov in the semi-finals, and Àlex Corretja in the final. After winning the title, Carretero lost in the first round of Roland Garros and did not have any significant results other than winning a Challenger tournament held in Sopot, Poland in 1999.

He retired from professional tennis after the 2001 season.

== ATP career finals ==
=== Singles: 1(1 title) ===
Legend Grand Slam Tournaments (0–0) ATP World Tour Finals (0–0) ATP Masters Series (1–0) ATP Championship Series (0–0) ATP World Series (0–0)	Finals by surface Hard (0–0) Clay (1–0) Grass (0–0) Carpet (0–0)	Finals by setting Outdoors (1–0) Indoors (0–0)

Result	W–L	Date	Tournament	Tier	Surface	Opponent	Score
Win	1–0	May 1996	Hamburg, Germany	Masters Series	Clay	(Spain) Àlex Corretja	2–6, 6–4, 6–4, 6–4

== ATP Challenger and ITF Futures finals ==
=== Singles: 3 (2–1) ===
Legend ATP Challenger (2–1) ITF Futures (0–0)	Finals by surface Hard (0–0) Clay (2–1) Grass (0–0) Carpet (0–0)

Result	W–L	Date	Tournament	Tier	Surface	Opponent	Score
Loss	0-1	Jun 1995	Kosice, Slovakia	Challenger	Clay	(Romania) Adrian Voinea	3–6, 6–4, 1–6
Win	1-1	Jun 1999	Weiden, Germany	Challenger	Clay	(Belgium) Christophe Van Garsse	6–1, 7–5
Win	2-1	Aug 1999	Sopot, Poland	Challenger	Clay	(France) Thierry Guardiola	6–4, 7–5

== Performance timeline ==
Key
W	F	SF	QF	#R	RR	Q#	DNQ	A	NH

(W) winner; (F) finalist; (SF) semifinalist; (QF) quarterfinalist; (#R) rounds 4, 3, 2, 1; (RR) round-robin stage; (Q#) qualification round; (DNQ) did not qualify; (A) absent; (NH) not held; (SR) strike rate (events won / competed); (W–L) win–loss record.

=== Singles ===
Tournament	1994	1995	1996	1997	1998	SR	W–L	Win%
Grand Slam tournaments
Australian Open	A	A	A	1R	A	0 / 1	0–1	0%
French Open	Q1	Q3	1R	2R	Q1	0 / 2	1–2	33%
Wimbledon	A	A	A	A	A	0 / 0	0–0	–
US Open	A	A	2R	A	A	0 / 1	1–1	50%
Win–loss	0–0	0–0	1–2	1–2	0–0	0 / 4	2–4	33%
ATP World Tour Masters 1000
Monte Carlo	1R	Q2	A	1R	A	0 / 2	0–2	0%
Hamburg	Q1	1R	W	2R	A	1 / 3	7–2	78%
Rome	A	2R	1R	1R	Q1	0 / 3	1–3	25%
Win–loss	0–1	1–2	6–1	1–3	0–0	1 / 8	8–7	53%

== Wins over top 10 players ==
#	Player	Rank	Event	Surface	Rd	Score
1996
1.	(Russia) Yevgeny Kafelnikov	7	Hamburg, Germany	Clay	SF	7–5, 6–2

== Junior Grand Slam finals ==
=== Singles: 1 (1 title) ===
Result	Year	Tournament	Surface	Opponent	Score
Win	1993	French Open	Clay	(Spain) Albert Costa	6–0, 7–6
