= Massimo Bertolini =

Italian tennis player

- Country (sports): Italy
- Residence: Verona, Italy
- Born: 30 May 1974 (age 51) Verona, Italy
- Height: 1.87 m (6 ft 1 1/2 in)
- Turned pro: 1993
- Retired: 2006
- Plays: Right-handed
- Prize money: $487,546

Singles
- Career record: 0–0
- Career titles: 0
- Highest ranking: No. 329 (1 May 1995)

Doubles
- Career record: 92–128
- Career titles: 2; 12 Challenger, 0 Futures
- Highest ranking: No. 36 (3 May 2004)

Grand Slam doubles results
- Australian Open: 2R (2002, 2004)
- French Open: QF (2003)
- Wimbledon: 3R (2000)
- US Open: QF (2001)

Other doubles tournaments
- Olympic Games: 2R (2000)

Grand Slam mixed doubles results
- French Open: 1R (2004)
- Wimbledon: 1R (2003)
- Last updated on: 18 June 2021.

Massimo Bertolini (born 30 May 1974) is a retired, Italian professional tennis player.

Bertolini had a career high ATP singles ranking of World No. 329, achieved on 1 May 1995. He also had a career high ATP doubles ranking of World No. 36, achieved on 3 May 2004.

A doubles specialist, Bertolini reached 34 doubles finals across his career with a record of 14 wins and 20 losses. Included among those results, he went 12–14 in ATP Challenger Tour finals as well as winning two ATP Tour titles (2–5 overall record). He also reached two Grand Slam quarter-finals, at the 2001 US Open and the 2003 French Open.

== ATP career finals ==
=== Doubles: 7 (2 titles, 5 runner-ups) ===
Legend Grand Slam tournaments (0–0) ATP World Tour Finals (0–0) ATP World Tour Masters 1000 (0–0) ATP World Tour 500 Series (0–1) ATP World Tour 250 Series (2–4)	Finals by surface Hard (0–0) Clay (2–5) Grass (0–0)	Finals by setting Outdoor (2–5) Indoor (0–0)

Result	W–L	Date	Tournament	Tier	Surface	Partner	Opponents	Score
Loss	0–1	Nov 1998	Santiago, Chile	World Series	Clay	(United States) Devin Bowen	(Argentina) Sebastián Prieto (Argentina) Mariano Hood	6–7, 7–6, 6–7
Loss	0–2	Apr 1999	Barcelona, Spain	Championship Series	Clay	(Italy) Cristian Brandi	(Netherlands) Paul Haarhuis (Russia) Yevgeny Kafelnikov	5–7, 3–6
Loss	0–3	May 1999	Munich, Germany	World Series	Clay	(Italy) Cristian Brandi	(Argentina) Daniel Orsanic (Argentina) Mariano Puerta	6–7^{(3–7)}, 6–3, 6–7^{(3–7)}
Loss	0–4	Aug 1999	Unag, Croatia	World Series	Clay	(Italy) Cristian Brandi	(Argentina) Mariano Puerta (Spain) Javier Sánchez	6–3, 2–6, 3–6
Loss	0–5	Jul 2002	Gstaad, Switzerland	World Series	Clay	(Italy) Cristian Brandi	(Australia) Joshua Eagle (Czech Republic) David Rikl	6–7^{(5–7)}, 4–6
Win	1–5	May 2003	Sankt Pölten, Austria	World Series	Clay	(Sweden) Simon Aspelin	(Armenia) Sargis Sargsian (Socialist Federal Republic of Yugoslavia) Nenad Zimonjić	6–4, 6–7^{(8–10)}, 6–3
Win	2–5	Jul 2003	Båstad, Sweden	World Series	Clay	(Sweden) Simon Aspelin	(Argentina) Lucas Arnold Ker (Argentina) Mariano Hood	6–7^{(3–7)}, 6–0, 6–4

== ATP Challenger and ITF Futures finals ==
=== Doubles: 27 (12–15) ===
Legend ATP Challenger (12–14) ITF Futures (0–1)	Finals by surface Hard (2–2) Clay (9–11) Grass (0–2) Carpet (1–0)

Result	W–L	Date	Tournament	Tier	Surface	Partner	Opponents	Score
Loss	0–1	Jul 1994	Bristol, United Kingdom	Challenger	Grass	(Belgium) Dick Norman	(Italy) Pietro Pennisi (Romania) Alexandru Radulescu	4–6, 5–7
Loss	0–2	Jul 1995	Manchester, United Kingdom	Challenger	Grass	(Italy) Diego Nargiso	(United Kingdom) Tim Henman (United Kingdom) Mark Petchey	3–6, 4–6
Win	1–2	Mar 1998	Cherbourg, France	Challenger	Hard	(Italy) Massimo Ardinghi	(France) Jean-Philippe Fleurian (France) Stéphane Simian	6–3, 2–6, 6–4
Win	2–2	Apr 1998	Napoli, Italy	Challenger	Clay	(United States) Devin Bowen	(Hungary) Gábor Köves (Egypt) Tamer El Sawy	7–6, 6–2
Loss	2–3	Jul 1998	Venice, Italy	Challenger	Clay	(Netherlands) Sander Groen	(Federal Republic of Yugoslavia) Nebojsa Djordjevic (South Africa) Marcos Ondruska	6–1, 1–6, 2–6
Loss	2–4	Oct 1998	Barcelona, Spain	Challenger	Clay	(Italy) Cristian Brandi	(Spain) José Antonio Conde (Spain) Javier Sánchez	6–4, 4–6, 3–6
Loss	2–5	Feb 1999	Cherbourg, France	Challenger	Hard	(Italy) Cristian Brandi	(Australia) Michael Hill (Australia) Andrew Painter	5–7, 6–7
Loss	2–6	Apr 1999	Napoli, Italy	Challenger	Clay	(Italy) Cristian Brandi	(United States) Jack Waite (South Africa) Marcos Ondruska	4–6, 6–7
Loss	2–7	Jun 2001	Biella, Italy	Challenger	Clay	(Italy) Cristian Brandi	(Argentina) Andrés Schneiter (Argentina) Enzo Artoni	6–7^{(5–7)}, 6–4, 1–6
Win	3–7	Aug 2001	Bressanone, Italy	Challenger	Clay	(Italy) Cristian Brandi	(Australia) Stephen Huss (Australia) Lee Pearson	7–5, 6–3
Win	4–7	Mar 2002	Barletta, Italy	Challenger	Clay	(Italy) Cristian Brandi	(Italy) Renzo Furlan (Italy) Uros Vico	4–6, 6–3, 7–6^{(7–4)}
Loss	4–8	May 2002	Italy F3, Verona	Futures	Clay	(Italy) Achille Margotto	(Italy) Stefano Tarallo (Italy) Elia Grossi	2–6, 7–5, 3–6
Win	5–8	Jul 2002	Mantova, Italy	Challenger	Clay	(Italy) Giorgio Galimberti	(Argentina) Jose-Maria Arnedo (Australia) Joseph Sirianni	5–7, 6–2, 7–6^{(9–7)}
Loss	5–9	Aug 2002	San Marino, San Marino	Challenger	Clay	(Italy) Cristian Brandi	(Czech Republic) Leoš Friedl (Czech Republic) David Škoch	2–6, 4–6
Loss	5–10	Oct 2002	Grenoble, France	Challenger	Hard	(Italy) Cristian Brandi	(Australia) Todd Larkham (Australia) Michael Tebbutt	6–4, 3–6, 4–6
Win	6–10	Dec 2002	Milan, Italy	Challenger	Carpet	(Italy) Giorgio Galimberti	(Israel) Jonathan Erlich (North Macedonia) Aleksandar Kitinov	7–6^{(7–4)}, 2–6, 7–6^{(7–4)}
Loss	6–11	Mar 2003	Barletta, Italy	Challenger	Clay	(Italy) Giorgio Galimberti	(Argentina) Sebastián Prieto (Argentina) Sergio Roitman	3–6, 6–3, 3–6
Win	7–11	Apr 2003	Napoli, Italy	Challenger	Clay	(Italy) Giorgio Galimberti	(Israel) Amir Hadad (Belgium) Christophe Rochus	2–6, 7–5, 6–4
Win	8–11	Aug 2003	San Marino, San Marino	Challenger	Clay	(Belgium) Tom Vanhoudt	(Argentina) Federico Browne (Slovakia) Dominik Hrbatý	7–5, 6–7^{(3–7)}, 6–2
Win	9–11	Aug 2004	San Marino, San Marino	Challenger	Clay	(Belgium) Tom Vanhoudt	(Spain) Álex López Morón (Chile) Adrián García	6–2, 6–4
Win	10–11	Aug 2004	Trani, Italy	Challenger	Clay	(Spain) Álex López Morón	(Czech Republic) Jan Vacek (Czech Republic) Martin Štěpánek	2–6, 6–4, 6–3
Loss	10–12	Sep 2004	Genoa, Italy	Challenger	Clay	(Belgium) Tom Vanhoudt	(Spain) Emilio Benfele Álvarez (Spain) Álex López Morón	3–6, 4–6
Win	11–12	Nov 2004	Luxembourg, Luxembourg	Challenger	Hard	(Czech Republic) Petr Luxa	(Germany) Karsten Braasch (Germany) Michael Kohlmann	7–6^{(7–4)}, 4–6, 6–3
Loss	11–13	Apr 2005	Napoli, Italy	Challenger	Clay	(Italy) Uros Vico	(Serbia and Montenegro) Janko Tipsarević (Czech Republic) Jiří Vaněk	6–3, 4–6, 2–6
Win	12–13	Apr 2005	Olbia, Italy	Challenger	Clay	(Italy) Uros Vico	(Italy) Alessio di Mauro (Italy) Tomas Tenconi	6–4, 6–4
Loss	12–14	Apr 2005	Monza, Italy	Challenger	Clay	(Italy) Uros Vico	(France) Nicolas Devilder (France) Olivier Patience	5–7, 4–6
Loss	12–15	Jun 2005	Braunschweig, Germany	Challenger	Clay	(Belgium) Tom Vanhoudt	(Italy) Enzo Artoni (Spain) Álex López Morón	7–5, 4–6, 6–7^{(12–14)}

== Performance timeline ==
Key
W	F	SF	QF	#R	RR	Q#	DNQ	A	NH

(W) winner; (F) finalist; (SF) semifinalist; (QF) quarterfinalist; (#R) rounds 4, 3, 2, 1; (RR) round-robin stage; (Q#) qualification round; (DNQ) did not qualify; (A) absent; (NH) not held; (SR) strike rate (events won / competed); (W–L) win–loss record.

=== Doubles ===
Tournament	1992	1993	1994	1995	1996	1997	1998	1999	2000	2001	2002	2003	2004	2005	SR	W–L	Win %
Grand Slam tournaments
Australian Open	A	A	A	A	A	A	A	1R	1R	A	2R	1R	2R	A	0 / 5	2–5	29%
French Open	A	A	A	A	A	A	A	1R	1R	1R	1R	QF	2R	2R	0 / 7	5–7	42%
Wimbledon	A	A	A	A	A	Q1	1R	1R	3R	1R	1R	1R	1R	1R	0 / 8	2–8	20%
US Open	A	A	A	A	A	A	A	1R	1R	QF	1R	1R	1R	2R	0 / 7	4–7	36%
Win–loss	0–0	0–0	0–0	0–0	0–0	0–0	0–1	0–4	2–4	3–3	1–4	3–4	2–4	2–3	0 / 27	13–27	33%
ATP Tour Masters 1000
Indian Wells Masters	A	A	A	A	A	A	A	A	A	A	A	A	1R	A	0 / 1	0–1	0%
Miami Open	A	A	A	A	A	A	A	A	3R	A	A	A	1R	A	0 / 2	2–2	50%
Monte Carlo	A	A	A	A	A	A	A	A	1R	A	A	A	2R	A	0 / 2	1–2	33%
Rome Masters	1R	Q1	A	A	A	A	A	QF	SF	Q1	2R	1R	1R	A	0 / 6	6–6	50%
Win–loss	0–1	0–0	0–0	0–0	0–0	0–0	0–0	2–1	5–3	0–0	1–1	0–1	1–4	0–0	0 / 11	9–11	45%
