= Cristian Brandi =

Italian tennis player

- Full name: Cristian Brandi
- Country (sports): Italy
- Residence: Monte Carlo, Monaco
- Born: June 10, 1970 (age 54); Brindisi, Italy
- Height: 183 cm (6 ft 0 in)
- Turned pro: 1988
- Retired: 2010 (inactive)
- Plays: Right-Handed
- Prize money: $607,038

Singles
- Career record: 0–0
- Highest ranking: 544 (30 January 1989)

Doubles
- Career record: 120–196
- Career titles: 2
- Highest ranking: 50 (3 April 2000)

Grand Slam doubles results
- Australian Open: 2R (1994, 1996, 1998, 2002)
- French Open: 3R (1997)
- Wimbledon: 3R (1995, 2000)
- US Open: 1R (1992, 1993, 1994, 1995, 1997, 1999, 2000, 2001, 2002)
- Last updated on: 11 April 2021.

Cristian Brandi (born 10 June 1970 in Brindisi, Italy) is a former professional tennis player from Italy.

Brandi enjoyed most of his tennis success while playing doubles. During his career, he won two doubles titles and finished as a runner-up nine times. He achieved a career-high doubles ranking of World No. 50 in 2000.

Brandi participated in three Davis Cup ties for Italy from 1994 to 1995, posting a 2–1 record in doubles.

== Career finals ==
=== Doubles (2 wins, 9 losses) ===
Result	W-L	Date	Tournament	Surface	Partner	Opponents	Score
Loss	1.	1992	San Marino	Clay	(Italy) Federico Mordegan	(Sweden) Nicklas Kulti (Sweden) Mikael Tillström	2–6, 2–6
Loss	2.	1994	Casablanca, Morocco	Clay	(Italy) Federico Mordegan	(South Africa) David Adams (Netherlands) Menno Oosting	3–6, 4–6
Win	1.	1994	Estoril, Portugal	Clay	(Italy) Federico Mordegan	(Netherlands) Richard Krajicek (Netherlands) Menno Oosting	W/O
Loss	3.	1994	Athens, Greece	Clay	(Italy) Federico Mordegan	(Argentina) Luis Lobo (Spain) Javier Sánchez	7–5, 1–6, 4–6
Loss	4.	1996	Palermo, Italy	Clay	(Spain) Emilio Sánchez	(Australia) Andrew Kratzmann (South Africa) Marcos Ondruska	6–7, 4–6
Win	2.	1997	San Marino	Clay	(Italy) Filippo Messori	(United States) Brandon Coupe (Mexico) David Roditi	7–5, 6–4
Loss	5.	1998	Casablanca, Morocco	Clay	(Italy) Filippo Messori	(Italy) Andrea Gaudenzi (Italy) Diego Nargiso	4–6, 6–7
Loss	6.	1999	Barcelona, Spain	Clay	(Italy) Massimo Bertolini	(Netherlands) Paul Haarhuis (Russia) Yevgeny Kafelnikov	5–7, 3–6
Loss	7.	1999	Munich, Germany	Clay	(Italy) Massimo Bertolini	(Argentina) Daniel Orsanic (Argentina) Mariano Puerta	6–7, 6–3, 6–7
Loss	8.	1999	Umag, Croatia	Clay	(Italy) Massimo Bertolini	(Argentina) Mariano Puerta (Spain) Javier Sánchez	6–3, 2–6, 3–6
Loss	9.	2002	Gstaad, Switzerland	Clay	(Italy) Massimo Bertolini	(Australia) Joshua Eagle (Czech Republic) David Rikl	6–7, 4–6
