= Mariano Puerta =

Argentine tennis player

Mariano Rubén Puerta
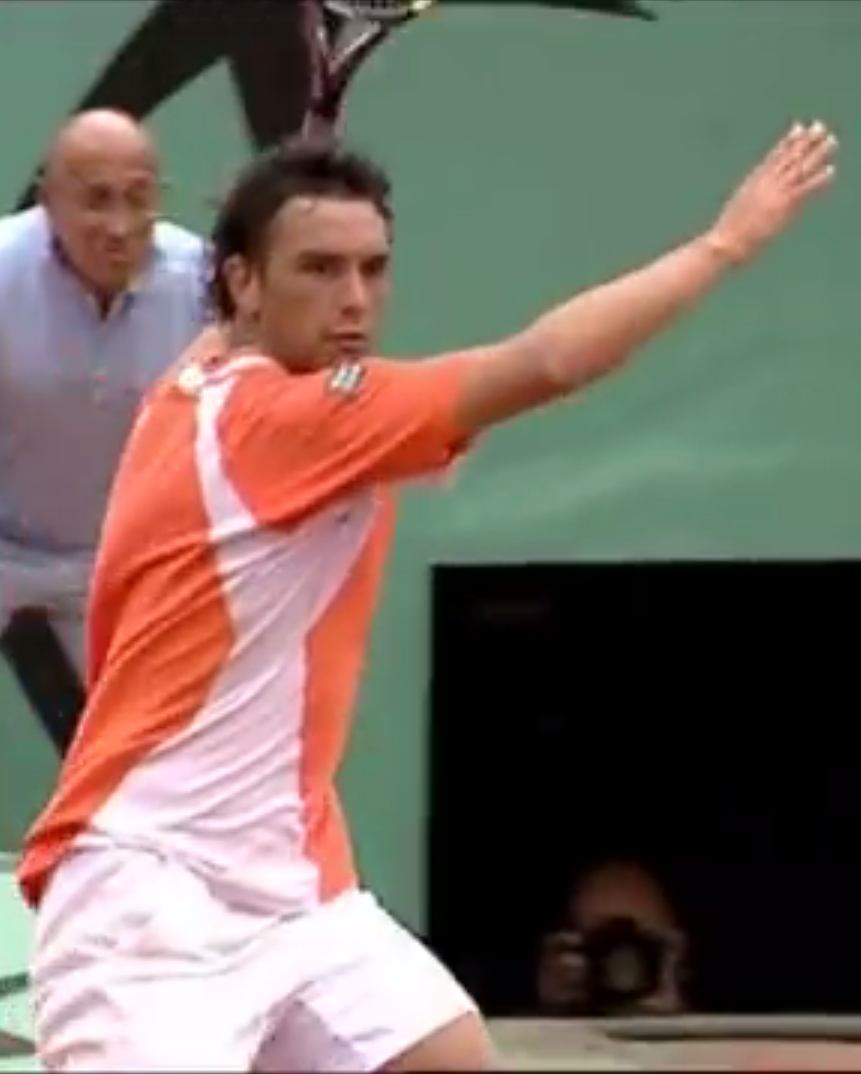
- Country (sports): Argentina
- Residence: Buenos Aires, Argentina; Miami, Florida, U.S. (2014–present)
- Born: 19 September 1978 (age 48) San Francisco, Córdoba, Argentina
- Height: 1.80 m (5 ft 11 in)
- Turned pro: 1998
- Retired: 2009
- Plays: Left-handed (one-handed backhand)
- Prize money: US$1,781,372

Singles
- Career record: 128–118
- Career titles: 3
- Highest ranking: No. 9 (15 August 2005)

Grand Slam singles results
- Australian Open: 2R (1999)
- French Open: F (~~2005~~)
- Wimbledon: 1R (1998, 2001, 2003, ~~2005~~)
- US Open: 2R (1999, ~~2005~~)

Other tournaments
- Tour Finals: RR (~~2005~~)

Doubles
- Career record: 42–54
- Career titles: 3
- Highest ranking: No. 68 (2 August 1999)

Grand Slam doubles results
- Australian Open: 1R (1999, 2000, 2003)
- French Open: 2R (1999)
- Wimbledon: 1R (~~2005~~)
- US Open: 1R (1998, 2003, ~~2005~~)

Mariano Rubén Puerta (Spanish pronunciation: [maˈɾjano ruˈβem ˈpweɾta]; (Note: In isolation, Rubén is pronounced [ruˈβen].) born 19 September 1978) is an Argentine tennis coach and a former professional player. He reached a career-high ATP world No. 9 singles ranking in August 2005. His career highlight is reaching the final of the French Open in 2005.

Shortly afterwards he tested positive for the banned substance etilefrine in a drugs test, for which he received an eight-year doping ban, subsequently reduced to two years on appeal.

== Tennis career ==
Puerta made his debut on the ATP Tour in 1997, and turned professional in 1998. He won his first ATP title in 1998 in Palermo, Italy. In 2000, Puerta achieved his highest year-end ranking of World No. 21, reaching five finals, and winning one of them (Bogotá). That same year, however, he underwent wrist surgery, which kept him off the tour for several months.

Besides from not recovering his previous playing level, he was suspended from tennis for 9 months from October 2003 onwards for a doping offense (see section on doping controversies). Owing to the suspension he missed most of the 2004 season, and by August 2004 his world ranking had dropped to No. 440. He was reduced to playing Challenger-level tournaments for a while until he had earned enough points to return to the ATP Tour.

In 2005, Puerta made an eye-opening comeback on the Tour by winning the title in Casablanca and then making it to the final of the world's most prestigious clay court tournament, the French Open, where he eventually succumbed to Rafael Nadal in a close match (7–6^{(8–6)}, 3–6, 1–6, 5–7). By August 2005 he had climbed to a career-best World No. 9 in the ATP singles rankings, an advancement of 431 places in one year.

In December 2005, he was, again, suspended for a doping offense, this time for 8 years, effectively ending his professional career. This suspension was later reduced to two years on appeal.

On June 6, 2007, Puerta returned to the professional circuit with a 6–4, 6–3 victory over Australian Joseph Sirianni at the Sassuolo Challenger, a tournament to which he was invited as a wild card since he had no ranking. In the second round, Puerta lost 6–3, 6–0 to Spaniard Marc López. Since returning to the tour, Puerta has only played on the ATP Challenger Tour, including winning the Bogotá Challenger in 2008 and reaching the final of the San Luis Potosí Challenger in 2008 without dropping a set, where he was forced to default the final, and the Cordenons challenger in 2007.

== Playing style ==
Puerta is left-handed and uses a single-handed backhand. He is an excellent clay-court specialist with a game that revolves around very accurate and powerful groundstrokes off both wings with heavy topspin. His main weaknesses are his mental strength, slow court speed and comparatively weak serve, the latter two which significantly prevents his success on fast surfaces. He is also very capable at the net, having good volleys and quick reflexes despite his slow court speed.

== Doping controversies ==
In 2003, Puerta received a two-year doping suspension after testing positive for clenbuterol at Viña del Mar. In his defence, he argued that the substance had been administered to him by his doctor to combat asthma and that it had no performance-enhancing effect. The sanction was subsequently reduced to nine months suspension, effective from October 2003, and a $5,600 fine.

In December 2005, Puerta was banned again, this time after it was revealed that he had tested positive for the use of the cardiac stimulant etilefrine following his 2005 French Open final loss to Rafael Nadal. News of this positive drug test had been circulating since October 2005. The suspension was for eight years, the longest in tennis history at that time. As a result, Puerta was forced to forfeit all of his rankings points and prize money (totalling US$887,000) from the 2005 French Open onwards; and had all his 2005 results from that point onwards annulled. (Puerta's finish as a finalist at the 2005 French Open was allowed to remain on the record books only insofar as no completed match results were retroactively overturned; a scenario in which the ultimate score from the men's final may have been nullified, and/or a "lucky loser" semifinalist chosen for promotion to nominal runner-up.)

The International Tennis Federation (ITF) tribunal posited that "the amount of etilefrine detected in the positive drugs test was too small to have any effect on his performance"; this theory, however, being at odds with etilefrine's extremely short terminal elimination half-life. Puerta appealed against the ban, claiming on his website that he only ingested trace amounts of it accidentally left over by his wife in a glass. On July 12, 2006, his suspension was reduced to two years by the Court of Arbitration for Sport, making him eligible to restart his career on June 5, 2007.

In 2020 (following 11 years of retirement and his ensuing bankruptcy), Puerta admitted he had lied to the tribunal about the cause of the etilefrine contamination; stating the actual source was ginseng and caffeine pills which a friend of his fitness trainer Darío Lecman had given him. Though Lecman subsequently denied any involvement in their provenance, the Argentine's then-coach Andrés Schneiter confirmed Puerta had regularly used similar pills throughout the first half of the 2005 season. Puerta claimed he later sought testing of remaining pills in the batch, and that Olindo Iacobelli then informed him of their contamination. The ITF expressed regret over Puerta's belated confessions, but – after a review of the original case – decided not to reopen disciplinary proceedings against him, citing both resourcing constraints and the age of the case.

Rafael Nadal, who defeated Puerta to win his first of 14 Roland-Garros titles, stated that as the champion, he was not concerned by the revelation of Puerta's doping. He acknowledged, however, that Puerta's previous opponents may have felt robbed of their opportunity to compete fairly. In 2024, Nikolay Davydenko (who had lost to Puerta in the 2005 French Open semifinals) commented that he was 'physically dead' during the match, whilst Puerta was fresh; but that he did not know whether doping was the cause of Puerta's increased stamina.

== Grand Slam finals ==
=== Singles: 1 (1 runner-up) ===
Outcome	Year	Championship	Surface	Opponent	Score
Loss	2005	French Open	Clay	(Spain) Rafael Nadal	7–6^{(8–6)}, 3–6, 1–6, 5–7

== ATP career finals ==
=== Singles: 10 (3 titles, 7 runner-ups) ===
Legend (singles) Grand Slam (0–1) ATP World Tour Finals (0–0) ATP Masters Series (0–0) ATP International Series Gold (0–1) ATP World Series (3–5)	Finals by surface Hard (0–0) Clay (3–7) Grass (0–0)	Finals by setting Outdoor (3–7) Indoor (0–0)

Result	W–L	Date	Tournament	Tier	Surface	Opponent	Score
Loss	0–1	Aug 1998	San Marino Open, San Marino	World Series	Clay	(Slovakia) Dominik Hrbatý	2–6, 5–7
Win	1–1	Oct 1998	Palermo, Italy	World Series	Clay	(Argentina) Franco Squillari	6–3, 6–2
Loss	1–2	Feb 2000	Mexican Open, Mexico	International Series Gold	Clay	(Argentina) Juan Ignacio Chela	4–6, 6–7^{(4–7)}
Loss	1–3	Mar 2000	Chile Open, Chile	World Series	Clay	(Brazil) Gustavo Kuerten	6–7^{(3–7)}, 3–6
Win	2–3	Mar 2000	Bancolombia Open, Colombia	World Series	Clay	(Morocco) Younes El Aynaoui	6–4, 7–6^{(7–5)}
Loss	2–4	Jul 2000	Swiss Open, Switzerland	World Series	Clay	(Spain) Àlex Corretja	1–6, 3–6
Loss	2–5	Jul 2000	Croatia Open, Croatia	World Series	Clay	(Chile) Marcelo Ríos	6–7^{(1–7)}, 6–4, 3–6
Loss	2–6	Feb 2005	Buenos Aires, Argentina	International Series	Clay	(Argentina) Gastón Gaudio	4–6, 4–6
Win	3–6	Apr 2005	Casablanca, Morocco	International Series	Clay	(Argentina) Juan Mónaco	6–4, 6–1
Loss	3–7	Jun 2005	French Open, France	Grand Slam	Clay	(Spain) Rafael Nadal	7–6^{(8–6)}, 3–6, 1–6, 5–7

=== Doubles: 3 (3 titles) ===
Legend (doubles) Grand Slam (0–0) ATP World Tour Finals (0–0) ATP Masters Series (0–0) ATP International Series Gold (0–0) ATP World Series (3–0)	Finals by surface Hard (0–0) Clay (3–0) Grass (0–0)	Finals by setting Outdoor (3–0) Indoor (0–0)

Result	W–L	Date	Tournament	Tier	Surface	Partner	Opponents	Score
Win	1–0	Aug 1998	Bancolombia Open, Colombia	World Series	Clay	(Argentina) Diego del Río	(Hungary) Gábor Köves (Philippines) Eric Taino	6–7, 6–3, 6–2
Win	2–0	May 1999	Bavarian Championships, Germany	World Series	Clay	(Argentina) Daniel Orsanic	(Italy) Massimo Bertolini (Italy) Cristian Brandi	7–6^{(7–3)}, 3–6, 7–6^{(7–3)}
Win	3–0	Aug 1999	Croatia Open, Croatia	World Series	Clay	(Spain) Javier Sánchez	(Italy) Massimo Bertolini (Italy) Cristian Brandi	3–6, 6–2, 6–3

== ATP Challenger and ITF Futures finals ==
=== Singles: 19 (11–8) ===
Legend ATP Challenger (10–8) ITF Futures (1–0)	Finals by surface Hard (0–0) Clay (11–8) Grass (0–0) Carpet (0–0)

Result	W–L	Date	Tournament	Tier	Surface	Opponent	Score
Win	1–0	Jul 1997	Quito, Ecuador	Challenger	Clay	(Paraguay) Ramón Delgado	6–1, 7–5
Win	2–0	Apr 1998	Nice, France	Challenger	Clay	(France) Arnaud Di Pasquale	6–7, 6–4, 6–4
Loss	2–1	Apr 1998	Espinho, Portugal	Challenger	Clay	(Argentina) Guillermo Cañas	1–6, 6–2, 2–6
Loss	2–2	Jun 1998	Zagreb, Croatia	Challenger	Clay	(Czech Republic) Jiří Novák	5–7, 1–6
Loss	2–3	Jun 2002	Sassuolo, Italy	Challenger	Clay	(Spain) David Ferrer	4–6, 1–6
Win	3–3	Jul 2002	Mantova, Italy	Challenger	Clay	(Italy) Potito Starace	6–3, 1–0 ret.
Win	4–3	Sep 2002	Brindisi, Italy	Challenger	Clay	(Italy) Leonardo Azzaro	6–3, 7–6^{(7–2)}
Win	5–3	May 2003	Aix En Provence, France	Challenger	Clay	(Spain) Rafael Nadal	3–6, 7–6^{(8–6)}, 6–4
Loss	5–4	Jul 2003	Prostějov, Czech Republic	Challenger	Clay	(Czech Republic) Radek Štěpánek	5–7, 3–6
Win	6–4	Aug 2004	Samarkand, Uzbekistan	Challenger	Clay	(Czech Republic) Pavel Šnobel	6–1, 6–2
Win	7–4	Sep 2004	Tehran, Iran	Challenger	Clay	(Netherlands) Melle van Gemerden	6–3, 6–4
Win	8–4	Oct 2004	Chile F2, Santiago	Futures	Clay	(Argentina) Diego Moyano	6–1, 6–1
Win	9–4	Nov 2004	Santa Cruz, Bolivia	Challenger	Clay	(Brazil) Franco Ferreiro	6–7^{(5–7)}, 6–4, 6–3
Loss	9–5	Nov 2004	Bogotá, Colombia	Challenger	Clay	(Paraguay) Ramón Delgado	4–6, 5–7
Win	10–5	Dec 2004	Guadalajara, Mexico	Challenger	Clay	(Ecuador) Nicolás Lapentti	6–0, 6–2
Loss	10–6	Jan 2005	La Serena, Chile	Challenger	Clay	(Argentina) Edgardo Massa	4–6, 6–7^{(3–7)}
Loss	10–7	Aug 2007	Cordenons, Italy	Challenger	Clay	(Argentina) Máximo González	6–2, 5–7, 5–7
Loss	10–8	Mar 2008	San Luis Potosí, Mexico	Challenger	Clay	(Argentina) Brian Dabul	walkover
Win	11–8	Jul 2008	Bogotá, Colombia	Challenger	Clay	(Brazil) Ricardo Hocevar	7–6^{(7–2)}, 7–5

=== Doubles: 10 (5–5) ===
Legend ATP Challenger (5–5) ITF Futures (0–0)	Finals by surface Hard (0–0) Clay (5–5) Grass (0–0) Carpet (0–0)

Result	W–L	Date	Tournament	Tier	Surface	Partner	Opponents	Score
Loss	0–1	May 1997	Curitiba, Brazil	Challenger	Clay	(Argentina) Eduardo Medica	(United States) Glenn Weiner (Austria) Herbert Wiltschnig	3–6, 4–6
Win	1–1	Jul 1997	Cali, Colombia	Challenger	Clay	(Argentina) Eduardo Medica	(Mexico) Bernardo Martínez (Mexico) Marco Osorio	7–6, 7–5
Win	2–1	Aug 1997	Geneva, Switzerland	Challenger	Clay	(Argentina) Diego del Río	(France) Guillaume Marx (France) Olivier Morel	6–3, 6–4
Loss	2–2	Oct 1997	Santiago, Chile	Challenger	Clay	(Argentina) Diego del Río	(Argentina) Lucas Arnold Ker (Brazil) Jaime Oncins	2–6, 2–6
Loss	2–3	Oct 1997	Guayaquil, Ecuador	Challenger	Clay	(Argentina) Diego del Río	(Hungary) Gábor Köves (Sweden) Tomas Nydahl	6–2, 3–6, 6–7
Loss	2–4	Dec 1997	Santiago II, Chile	Challenger	Clay	(Argentina) Diego del Río	(Argentina) Sebastián Prieto (Argentina) Mariano Hood	5–7, 1–6
Loss	2–5	Apr 1998	Nice, France	Challenger	Clay	(Brazil) André Sá	(United States) Devin Bowen (Argentina) Mariano Hood	5–7, 6–3, 4–6
Win	3–5	Jun 1998	Zagreb, Croatia	Challenger	Clay	(Spain) Julian Alonso	(Spain) Eduardo Nicolás Espin (Spain) Germán Puentes Alcañiz	6–1, 6–4
Win	4–5	Sep 2000	Biella, Italy	Challenger	Clay	(Argentina) Martín García	(Sweden) Simon Aspelin (Sweden) Fredrik Bergh	6–2, 4–6, 6–4
Win	5–5	Jun 2008	Sofia, Bulgaria	Challenger	Clay	(Brazil) Franco Ferreiro	(North Macedonia) Lazar Magdinchev (North Macedonia) Predrag Rusevski	6–3, 1–6, [10–3]

== Junior Grand Slam finals ==
=== Singles: 1 (1 runner-up) ===
Result	Year	Tournament	Surface	Opponent	Score
Loss	1995	French Open	Clay	(Argentina) Mariano Zabaleta	2–6, 3–6

=== Doubles: 1 (1 runner-up) ===
Result	Year	Tournament	Surface	Partner	Opponents	Score
Loss	1995	Wimbledon	Grass	(Mexico) Alejandro Hernández	(United Kingdom) Martin Lee (United Kingdom) James Trotman	6–7, 4–6

== Performance timelines ==
Key
W	F	SF	QF	#R	RR	Q#	P#	DNQ	A	Z#	PO	G	S	B	NMS	NTI	P	NH

(W) winner; (F) finalist; (SF) semifinalist; (QF) quarterfinalist; (#R) rounds 4, 3, 2, 1; (RR) round-robin stage; (Q#) qualification round; (DNQ) did not qualify; (A) absent; (NH) not held; (SR) strike rate (events won / competed); (W–L) win–loss record.

=== Singles ===
Tournament	1998	1999	2000	2001	2002	2003	2004	2005	2006	2007	2008	2009	SR	W–L	Win %
Grand Slam tournaments
Australian Open	A	2R	1R	A	A	1R	A	A	A	A	A	A	0 / 3	1–3	25%
French Open	Q1	2R	3R	2R	2R	2R	A	F	A	A	A	A	0 / 6	12–6	67%
Wimbledon	1R	A	A	1R	A	1R	A	~~1R~~	A	A	A	A	0 / 3	0–3	0%
US Open	1R	2R	1R	A	A	1R	A	~~2R~~	A	A	A	A	0 / 4	1–4	20%
Win–loss	0–2	3–3	2–3	1–2	1–1	1–4	0–0	6–1	0–0	0–0	0–0	0–0	0 / 16	14–16	47%
Year-end championships
ATP World Tour Finals	Did not qualify							~~RR~~	Did not qualify				0 / 0	0–0	–
National representation
Summer Olympics	Not Held		A	Not Held			A	Not Held			A	NH	0 / 0	0–0	–
ATP Tour Masters 1000
Indian Wells Masters	A	1R	A	A	A	A	A	A	A	A	A	A	0 / 1	0–1	0%
Miami Masters	A	1R	A	1R	A	A	A	A	A	A	A	A	0 / 2	0–2	0%
Monte-Carlo Masters	A	A	2R	1R	A	A	A	3R	A	A	A	A	0 / 3	3–3	50%
Madrid Masters	Not Held				A	A	A	~~3R~~	A	A	A	A	0 / 0	0–0	–
Rome Masters	A	1R	QF	1R	A	A	A	A	A	A	A	A	0 / 3	3–3	50%
Hamburg Masters	A	3R	3R	1R	A	A	A	2R	A	A	A	NMS	0 / 3	4–3	50%
Canada Masters	A	A	1R	A	A	A	A	~~QF~~	A	A	A	A	0 / 1	0–1	0%
Cincinnati Masters	A	A	2R	A	A	A	A	~~1R~~	A	A	A	A	0 / 1	1–1	50%
Shanghai Masters	Not Held				NMS	Not Held		Not Masters Series				A	0 / 0	0–0	–
Paris Masters	A	A	1R	A	A	A	A	~~2R~~	A	A	A	A	0 / 1	0–1	0%
Win–loss	0–0	2–4	7–6	0–4	0–0	0–0	0–0	2–1	0–0	0–0	0–0	0–0	0 / 15	11–15	42%
Career Statistics
Finals	1	0	5	0	0	0	0	2	0	0	0	0	Career Total: 10		
Titles	1	0	1	0	0	0	0	1	0	0	0	0	Career Total: 3		
Year-End Ranking	39	101	21	254	116	118	133	56	–	261	195	311	Prize Money: $1,781,372		

=== Doubles ===
Tournament	1998	1999	2000	2001	2002	2003	2004	2005	SR	W–L	Win %
Grand Slam tournaments
Australian Open	A	1R	1R	A	A	1R	A	A	0 / 3	0–3	0%
French Open	1R	2R	A	A	A	A	A	1R	0 / 3	1–3	25%
Wimbledon	A	A	A	A	A	A	A	~~1R~~	0 / 0	0–0	–
US Open	1R	A	A	A	A	1R	A	~~1R~~	0 / 2	0–2	0%
Win–loss	0–2	1–2	0–1	0–0	0–0	0–2	0–0	0–1	0 / 8	1–8	11%
ATP Tour Masters 1000
Miami Masters	A	1R	A	A	A	A	A	A	0 / 1	0–1	0%
Monte-Carlo Masters	A	1R	A	A	A	A	A	A	0 / 1	0–1	0%
Madrid Masters	Not Held				A	A	A	~~1R~~	0 / 0	0–0	–
Rome Masters	A	1R	A	A	A	A	A	A	0 / 1	0–1	0%
Canada Masters	A	A	2R	A	A	A	A	~~2R~~	0 / 1	1–1	50%
Win–loss	0–0	0–3	1–1	0–0	0–0	0–0	0–0	0–0	0 / 4	1–4	20%

Walkovers are neither official wins nor official losses.

== See also ==
- List of doping cases in sport
