= 1997 Croatia Open Umag – Doubles =

Doubles
- 1997 Croatia Open Umag
- 1996 Champions: (Argentina) Pablo Albano (Argentina) Luis Lobo

Final
- Champions: (Romania) Dinu Pescariu (Italy) Davide Sanguinetti
- Runners-up: (Slovakia) Dominik Hrbatý (Slovakia) Karol Kučera
- Score: 7–6, 6–4

Details
- Draw: 16
- Seeds: 4

Events
Singles	Doubles
← 1996 ·	Croatia Open	· 1998 →

Pablo Albano and Luis Lobo were the defending champions, but they didn't compete this year.

Dinu Pescariu and Davide Sanguinetti won the title by defeating Dominik Hrbatý and Karol Kučera 7–6, 6–4 in the final.

== Seeds ==
1. (South Africa) Brent Haygarth / (United States) Greg Van Emburgh (first round)
2. (Sweden) Patrik Fredriksson / (Croatia) Saša Hiršzon (quarterfinals)
3. (Hungary) Gábor Köves / (Portugal) Nuno Marques (semifinals)
4. (South Africa) John-Laffnie de Jager / (United States) Scott Melville (first round)

== Draw ==
=== Key ===
- Q = Qualifier
- WC = Wild card
- LL = Lucky loser
- Alt = Alternate
- ITF = ITF entry
- PR = Protected ranking
- SR = Special ranking
- SE = Special exempt
- JE = Junior exempt
- JR = Junior Accelerator Programme entrant
- CO = College Accelerator Programme entrant
- NG = Next Gen Accelerator Program entrant
- w/o = Walkover
- r = Retired
- d = Defaulted

=== Draw ===
First round
1	(South Africa) B Haygarth (United States) G Van Emburgh	4	3
(Spain) A Martín (Spain) A Portas	6	6
(Slovakia) D Hrbatý (Slovakia) K Kučera	6	6
Q	(Spain) S Durán (Chile) G Silberstein	2	0
3	(Hungary) G Köves (Portugal) N Marques	6	7
(South Africa) C Ferreira (Croatia) I Ljubičić	4	6
(Croatia) Marcelo Manola (Croatia) I Karlović	7	5	6
WC	(Germany) Valentino Pest (Croatia) E Rasberger	5	7	4
(Spain) Carlos Martínez-Comet (Spain) E Nicolás	6	2
(Spain) D Caballero (Costa Rica) JA Marín	7	6
(Mexico) Ó Ortiz (Mexico) D Roditi	3	6	6
4	(South Africa) JL de Jager (United States) S Melville	6	2	3
WC	(Spain) C Moyá (Spain) F Vicente	3	6	0
(Romania) D Pescariu (Italy) D Sanguinetti	6	1	6
WC	(Spain) S Bruguera (Hungary) L Markovits	6	1
2	(Sweden) P Fredriksson (Croatia) S Hiršzon	7	6

Quarterfinals
(Spain) A Martín (Spain) A Portas	1	4
(Slovakia) D Hrbatý (Slovakia) K Kučera	6	6
3	(Hungary) G Köves (Portugal) N Marques	6	6
(Croatia) Marcelo Manola (Croatia) I Karlović	3	2
(Spain) D Caballero (Costa Rica) JA Marín	4	6
(Mexico) Ó Ortiz (Mexico) D Roditi	6	7
(Romania) D Pescariu (Italy) D Sanguinetti	6	1	6
2	(Sweden) P Fredriksson (Croatia) S Hiršzon	1	6	2

Semifinals
(Slovakia) D Hrbatý (Slovakia) K Kučera	3	6	6
3	(Hungary) G Köves (Portugal) N Marques	6	2	2
(Mexico) Ó Ortiz (Mexico) D Roditi	2	7	4
(Romania) D Pescariu (Italy) D Sanguinetti	6	6	6

Final
(Slovakia) D Hrbatý (Slovakia) K Kučera	6	4
(Romania) D Pescariu (Italy) D Sanguinetti	7	6
