= 1996 Croatia Open – Singles =

Singles
- 1996 Croatia Open
- 1995 Champion: (Austria) Thomas Muster

Final
- Champion: (Spain) Carlos Moyá
- Runner-up: (Spain) Félix Mantilla
- Score: 6–0, 7–6^{(7–4)}

Details
- Draw: 32
- Seeds: 8

Events
Singles	Doubles
← 1995 ·	Croatia Open	· 1997 →

Thomas Muster was the defending champion but did not compete that year.

Carlos Moyá won in the final 6–0, 7–6^{(7–4)} against Félix Mantilla.

== Seeds ==
A champion seed is indicated in bold text while text in italics indicates the round in which that seed was eliminated.

1. (Spain) Albert Costa (quarterfinals)
2. (Spain) Alberto Berasategui (first round)
3. (Spain) Félix Mantilla (final)
4. (Spain) **Carlos Moyá (champion)**
5. (Spain) Carlos Costa (second round)
6. (Argentina) Hernán Gumy (first round)
7. (Czech Republic) Ctislav Doseděl (semifinals)
8. (Morocco) Karim Alami (second round)

== Draw ==
=== Key ===
- Q = Qualifier
- WC = Wild card
- LL = Lucky loser
- Alt = Alternate
- ITF = ITF entry
- PR = Protected ranking
- SR = Special ranking
- SE = Special exempt
- JE = Junior exempt
- JR = Junior Accelerator Programme entrant
- CO = College Accelerator Programme entrant
- NG = Next Gen Accelerator Program entrant
- w/o = Walkover
- r = Retired
- d = Defaulted

First round
1	(Spain) **A Costa**	**6**	**7**
(Italy) O Camporese	2	5
(Hungary) S Noszály	1	4
(Uzbekistan) **O Ogorodov**	**6**	**6**
(Denmark) F Fetterlein	**6**	3	3
Q	(Austria) **S Koubek**	4	**6**	**6**
Q	(Croatia) G Orešić	4	0
7	(Czech Republic) **C Doseděl**	**6**	**6**
3	(Spain) **F Mantilla**	**7^{7}**	**6**
(Spain) R Carretero	6^{2}	3
(Argentina) **M Zabaleta**	**6**	**6**
Q	(Czech Republic) P Pála	3	1
(Austria) **G Schaller**	**7^{7}**	**6**
(Portugal) J Cunha e Silva	6^{2}	0
Q	(Ukraine) A Rybalko	1	4
5	(Spain) **C Costa**	**6**	**6**
6	(Argentina) H Gumy	**6**	5	1
(Spain) **M A Górriz**	3	**7**	**6**
(Czech Republic) **D Rikl**	**6**	**6**
WC	(Croatia) G Prpić	4	4
(Spain) **G Blanco**	6^{2}	**6**	**6**
(Ecuador) L Morejón	**7^{7}**	4	1
(Spain) J Sánchez	1	6^{8}
WC/4	(Spain) **C Moyá**	**6**	**7^{10}**
8	(Morocco) **K Alami**	**6**	**7^{7}**
(Brazil) F Meligeni	4	6^{4}
(Norway) **C Ruud**	**6**	**7**
(France) J Golmard	1	5
(Spain) T Carbonell	3	r
WC	(Croatia) **I Ljubičić**	**6**
(Brazil) **G Kuerten**	**6**	**6**
2	(Spain) A Berasategui	3	4

Second round
1	(Spain) **A Costa**	**7^{7}**	**6**
(Uzbekistan) O Ogorodov	6^{5}	1
Q	(Austria) S Koubek	0	2
7	(Czech Republic) **C Doseděl**	**6**	**6**
3	(Spain) **F Mantilla**	**6**	**6**
(Argentina) M Zabaleta	3	3
(Austria) **G Schaller**	4	**6**	**6**
5	(Spain) C Costa	**6**	2	0
(Spain) **M A Górriz**	**6**	**6**
(Czech Republic) D Rikl	3	1
(Spain) G Blanco	3	2
WC/4	(Spain) **C Moyá**	**6**	**6**
8	(Morocco) K Alami	3	3
(Norway) **C Ruud**	**6**	**6**
WC	(Croatia) I Ljubičić	2	1
(Brazil) **G Kuerten**	**6**	**6**

Quarterfinals
1	(Spain) A Costa	3	4
7	(Czech Republic) **C Doseděl**	**6**	**6**
3	(Spain) **F Mantilla**	**6**	**7^{7}**
(Austria) G Schaller	3	6^{4}
(Spain) M A Górriz	2	1
WC/4	(Spain) **C Moyá**	**6**	**6**
(Norway) **C Ruud**	**7**	**6**
(Brazil) G Kuerten	5	4

Semifinals
7	(Czech Republic) C Doseděl	2	r
3	(Spain) **F Mantilla**	**4**
WC/4	(Spain) **C Moyá**	**6**	**6**
(Norway) C Ruud	1	2

Final
3	(Spain) Félix Mantilla	0	6^{4}
WC/4	(Spain) **Carlos Moyá**	**6**	**7^{7}**
