= 1998 Croatia Open Umag – Singles =

Singles
- 1998 Croatia Open Umag
- 1997 Champion: (Spain) Félix Mantilla

Final
- Champion: (Czech Republic) Bohdan Ulihrach
- Runner-up: (Sweden) Magnus Norman
- Score: 6–3, 7–6^{(7–0)}

Details
- Draw: 32 (4 Q / 3 WC )
- Seeds: 8

Events
Singles	Doubles
← 1997 ·	Croatia Open	· 1999 →

The 1998 Croatia Open Umag was a tennis tournament played on outdoor clay courts in Umag, Croatia that was part of the International Series of the 1998 ATP Tour. The tournament was held from July 27 through August 2, 1998.

== Seeds ==
Champion seeds are indicated in bold text while text in italics indicates the round in which those seeds were eliminated.

1. (Spain) Carlos Moyá (first round)
2. (Spain) Félix Mantilla (quarterfinals)
3. (Slovakia) Karol Kučera (quarterfinals)
4. (Brazil) Gustavo Kuerten (quarterfinals)
5. (Slovakia) Dominik Hrbatý (first round)
6. (Sweden) Magnus Norman (final)
7. (Czech Republic) **Bohdan Ulihrach (champion)**
8. (Italy) Davide Sanguinetti (second round)

== Draw ==
=== Key ===
- Q = Qualifier
- WC = Wild card
- LL = Lucky loser
- Alt = Alternate
- ITF = ITF entry
- PR = Protected ranking
- SR = Special ranking
- SE = Special exempt
- JE = Junior exempt
- JR = Junior Accelerator Programme entrant
- CO = College Accelerator Programme entrant
- NG = Next Gen Accelerator Program entrant
- w/o = Walkover
- r = Retired
- d = Defaulted

=== Finals ===
Semifinals
(Costa Rica) Juan Antonio Marín	6^{3}	3
6	**(Sweden) Magnus Norman**	**7**	**6**
(Argentina) Mariano Puerta	3	3
7	**(Czech Republic) Bohdan Ulihrach**	**6**	**6**

Final
6	(Sweden) Magnus Norman	3	6^{0}
7	**(Czech Republic) Bohdan Ulihrach**	**6**	**7**

=== Top half ===
First round
1	(Spain) C Moyá	5	**6**	1
**(Netherlands) P Haarhuis**	**7**	4	**6**
(Germany) J Knippschild	3	1
**(Spain) J Burillo**	**6**	**6**
**(Costa Rica) JA Marín**	4	**6**	**6**
(Italy) R Furlan	**6**	3	4
(Bulgaria) O Stanoytchev	4	**6**	4
8	**(Italy) D Sanguinetti**	**6**	3	**6**
3	**(Slovakia) K Kučera**	**6**	**6**
(Spain) S Bruguera	4	0
Q	**(Slovenia) B Urh**	**6**	**6**
Q	(Czech Republic) L Němeček	3	1
Q	**(Italy) S Cobolli**	5	**6**	**6**
Q	(Slovakia) T Čatár	**7**	4	3
WC	(Croatia) I Ljubičić	6^{4}	**6**	3
6/WC	**(Sweden) M Norman**	**7**	4	**6**

Second round
**(Netherlands) P Haarhuis**	w/o
(Spain) J Burillo
**(Costa Rica) JA Marín**	**7**	3	**6**
8	(Italy) D Sanguinetti	'6^{4}	**6**	3
3	**(Slovakia) K Kučera**	**7**	**6**
(Slovenia) B Urh	5	2
(Italy) S Cobolli	6^{5}	**6**	2
6	**(Sweden) M Norman**	**7**	3	**6**

Quarterfinals
(Netherlands) P Haarhuis	2	6^{2}
**(Costa Rica) JA Marín**	**6**	**7**
3	(Slovakia) K Kučera	**6**	4	4
6	**(Sweden) M Norman**	1	**6**	**6**

Semifinals
(Costa Rica) JA Marín	6^{3}	3
6	**(Sweden) M Norman**	**7**	**6**

=== Bottom half ===
First round
5	(Slovakia) D Hrbatý	3	**6**	4
**(Argentina) M Puerta**	**6**	2	**6**
(Italy) M Martelli	4	4
**(Spain) J Sánchez**	**6**	**6**
**(Czech Republic) J Novák**	**6**	1	**6**
(Italy) V Santopadre	2	**6**	1
(Germany) M-K Goellner	0	6^{3}
4	**(Brazil) G Kuerten**	**6**	**7**
7	**(Czech Republic) B Ulihrach**	**7**	**6**
(Romania) D Pescariu	6^{5}	4
**(Spain) J Díaz**	**6**	**6**
WC	(Croatia) E Rasberger	3	3
(Brazil) M Carlsson	**6**	5	3
**(Romania) A Voinea**	1	**7**	**6**
(Germany) L Burgsmüller	3	3
2	**(Spain) F Mantilla**	**6**	**6**

Second round
**(Argentina) M Puerta**	**6**	4	**6**
(Spain) J Sánchez	4	**6**	4
(Czech Republic) J Novák	**6**	6^{1}	3
4	**(Brazil) G Kuerten**	4	**7**	**6**
7	**(Czech Republic) B Ulihrach**	**7**	3	**6**
(Spain) J Díaz	6^{8}	**6**	4
(Romania) A Voinea	3	0
2	**(Spain) F Mantilla**	**6**	**6**

Quarterfinals
**(Argentina) M Puerta**	**6**	1	**7**
4	(Brazil) G Kuerten	4	**6**	6^{5}
7	**(Czech Republic) B Ulihrach**	**6**	3	**7**
2	(Spain) F Mantilla	3	**6**	6^{2}

Semifinals
(Argentina) M Puerta	3	3
7	**(Czech Republic) B Ulihrach**	**6**	**6**
