= 2002 Qatar Open =

2002 Qatar ExxonMobil Open
- Date: 31 December 2001 – 6 January 2002
- Edition: 10th
- Category: International Series
- Draw: 32S / 16D
- Prize money: $975,000
- Surface: Hard / outdoor
- Location: Doha, Qatar
- Venue: Khalifa International Tennis Complex

Champions

Singles
- (Morocco) Younes El Aynaoui

Doubles
- (United States) Donald Johnson / (United States) Jared Palmer
- ATP Qatar Open

The 2002 Qatar Open, known as the 2002 Qatar ExxonMobil Open, for sponsorship reasons, was a men's tennis tournament played on outdoor hard courts at the Khalifa International Tennis Complex in Doha, Qatar and was part of the International Series of the 2002 ATP Tour. The tournament ran from 31 December 2001 through 5 January 2002. Sixth-seeded Younes El Aynaoui won the singles title.

== Finals ==
=== Singles ===
(Morocco) Younes El Aynaoui defeated (Spain) Félix Mantilla 4–6, 6–2, 6–2

=== Doubles ===
(United States) Donald Johnson / (United States) Jared Palmer defeated (Czech Republic) Jiří Novák / (Czech Republic) David Rikl 6–3, 7–6^{(7–5)}
