= 1997 Croatia Open Umag – Singles =

Singles
- 1997 Croatia Open Umag
- 1996 Champion: (Spain) Carlos Moyá

Final
- Champion: (Spain) Félix Mantilla
- Runner-up: (Spain) Sergi Bruguera
- Score: 6–3, 7–5

Details
- Draw: 32 (4 Q / 3 WC )
- Seeds: 8

Events
Singles	Doubles
← 1996 ·	Croatia Open	· 1998 →

Carlos Moyá was the defending champion, but lost in the semifinals to Félix Mantilla.

Mantilla won the title by defeating Sergi Bruguera 6–3, 7–5 in the final.

For the first time since the San Jose tournament in 1995, all four semifinalists were from the same nationality, this time representing Spain. This achievement would remain unequaled until 2003, when four Americans filled the semifinals at the Memphis tournament.

== Seeds ==
1. (Spain) Sergi Bruguera (final)
2. (Spain) Carlos Moyá (semifinals)
3. (Spain) Félix Mantilla (champion)
4. (Spain) Javier Sánchez (quarterfinals)
5. (Slovakia) Dominik Hrbatý (quarterfinals)
6. (Slovakia) Karol Kučera (second round)
7. (Spain) Albert Portas (quarterfinals)
8. (Netherlands) Paul Haarhuis (quarterfinals)

== Draw ==
=== Key ===
- Q = Qualifier
- WC = Wild card
- LL = Lucky loser
- Alt = Alternate
- ITF = ITF entry
- PR = Protected ranking
- SR = Special ranking
- SE = Special exempt
- JE = Junior exempt
- JR = Junior Accelerator Programme entrant
- CO = College Accelerator Programme entrant
- NG = Next Gen Accelerator Program entrant
- w/o = Walkover
- r = Retired
- d = Defaulted

=== Finals ===
Semifinals
1	(Spain) Sergi Bruguera	6	6
(Spain) Alberto Martín	3	1
3	(Spain) Félix Mantilla	7^{7}	5	6
2	(Spain) Carlos Moyá	6^{5}	7	3

Final
1	(Spain) Sergi Bruguera	3	5
3	(Spain) Félix Mantilla	6	7

=== Top half ===
First round
1	(Spain) S Bruguera	6	6
(Chile) G Silberstein	0	4
(Russia) A Merinov	6	5	6
(Romania) R Sabău	4	7	2
(Italy) M Martelli	6	7
Q	(Croatia) Ž Krajan	1	5
(Costa Rica) JA Marín	4	6^{4}
8	(Netherlands) P Haarhuis	6	7^{7}
4	(Spain) J Sánchez	6	6
WC	(Croatia) S Hiršzon	1	2
(Romania) A Voinea	6	2	7^{9}
(Romania) D Pescariu	1	6	6^{7}
(Sweden) P Fredriksson	2	1
(Spain) A Martín	6	6
(Portugal) N Marques	6	2	3
6	(Slovakia) K Kučera	4	6	6

Second round
1	(Spain) S Bruguera	6	6
(Russia) A Merinov	0	1
(Italy) M Martelli	1	3
8	(Netherlands) P Haarhuis	6	6
4	(Spain) J Sánchez	6	6
(Romania) A Voinea	2	4
(Spain) A Martín	6	6
6	(Slovakia) K Kučera	3	4

Quarterfinals
1	(Spain) S Bruguera	6	6
8	(Netherlands) P Haarhuis	3	4
4	(Spain) J Sánchez	6	4	1
(Spain) A Martín	4	6	6

Semifinals
1	(Spain) S Bruguera	6	6
(Spain) A Martín	3	1

=== Bottom half ===
First round
5	(Slovakia) D Hrbatý	6	7^{7}
Q	(Spain) S Durán	3	6^{4}
WC	(Croatia) E Rasberger	3	6	4
(Spain) J Díaz	6	4	6
Q	(Spain) D Caballero	6	6
(Bulgaria) O Stanoytchev	2	2
(Russia) A Cherkasov	3	6^{4}
3	(Spain) F Mantilla	6	7^{7}
7	(Spain) A Portas	6	7
(Romania) A Pavel	2	5
WC	(Croatia) I Ljubičić	6	6
Q	(Ukraine) A Rybalko	4	4
(Spain) F Vicente	6	2
(Italy) A Gaudenzi	1	1^{r}
(Italy) D Sanguinetti	7	2^{r}
2	(Spain) C Moyá	5	4

Second round
5	(Slovakia) D Hrbatý	6	6
(Spain) J Díaz	0	2
Q	(Spain) D Caballero	3	3
3	(Spain) F Mantilla	6	6
7	(Spain) A Portas	7^{7}	6
WC	(Croatia) I Ljubičić	6^{5}	1
(Spain) F Vicente	6	1	5
2	(Spain) C Moyá	2	6	7

Quarterfinals
5	(Slovakia) D Hrbatý	6	3	4
3	(Spain) F Mantilla	3	6	6
7	(Spain) A Portas	6	3	5
2	(Spain) C Moyá	1	6	7

Semifinals
3	(Spain) F Mantilla	7^{7}	5	6
2	(Spain) C Moyá	6^{5}	7	3
