= 2003 Qatar Open – Singles =

Singles
- 2003 Qatar Open

Final
- Champion: (Austria) Stefan Koubek
- Runner-up: (United States) Jan-Michael Gambill
- Score: 6–4, 6–4

Details
- Draw: 32
- Seeds: 8

Events
Singles	Doubles
← 2002 ·	ATP Qatar Open	· 2004 →

Younes El Aynaoui was the defending champion but lost in the semifinals to Stefan Koubek.

Koubek won in the final 6–4, 6–4 against Jan-Michael Gambill.

== Seeds ==
1. (Switzerland) Roger Federer (quarterfinals)
2. (Spain) Albert Costa (second round)
3. (Morocco) Younes El Aynaoui (semifinals)
4. (Russia) Yevgeny Kafelnikov (first round)
5. (United Kingdom) ~~Greg Rusedski~~ (withdrew)
6. (Russia) Mikhail Youzhny (semifinals)
7. (France) Nicolas Escudé (first round)
8. (France) Fabrice Santoro (quarterfinals)
9. (United States) Jan-Michael Gambill (final)

== Draw ==
=== Key ===
- Q = Qualifier
- WC = Wild card
- LL = Lucky loser
- Alt = Alternate
- SE = Special exempt
- PR = Protected ranking
- ITF = ITF entry
- JE = Junior exempt
- w/o = Walkover
- r = Retired
- d = Defaulted
- SR = Special ranking

=== Finals ===
Semifinals
9	(United States) Jan-Michael Gambill	6	6
6	(Russia) Mikhail Youzhny	4	2
3	(Morocco) Younes El Aynaoui	6^{1}	6^{5}
(Austria) Stefan Koubek	7^{7}	7^{7}

Final
9	(United States) Jan-Michael Gambill	4	4
(Austria) Stefan Koubek	6	6

=== Top half ===
First round
1	(Switzerland) R Federer	6	6^{4}	6
LL	(Russia) A Stoliarov	2	7^{7}	4
(Switzerland) M Kratochvil	6	6
WC	(Qatar) S Khalfan	0	4
(Netherlands) R Sluiter	3	7^{7}	4
(Spain) D Ferrer	6	6^{2}	6
(Switzerland) I Heuberger	1	5
9	(United States) J-M Gambill	6	7
4	(Russia) Y Kafelnikov	2	5
(Spain) F Vicente	6	7
Q	(Germany) M Hantschk	7^{7}	6
(Denmark) K Carlsen	6^{3}	1
(Czech Republic) R Štěpánek	6^{4}	6	6
(Spain) F López	7^{7}	3	2
(Spain) D Sánchez	6	4	4
6	(Russia) M Youzhny	4	6	6

Second round
1	(Switzerland) R Federer	6	6
(Switzerland) M Kratochvil	4	4
(Spain) D Ferrer	6^{5}	4
9	(United States) J-M Gambill	7^{7}	6
(Spain) F Vicente	7	7^{7}
Q	(Germany) M Hantschk	5	6^{3}
(Czech Republic) R Štěpánek	3	1
6	(Russia) M Youzhny	6	6

Quarterfinals
1	(Switzerland) R Federer	4	5
9	(United States) J-M Gambill	6	7
(Spain) F Vicente	6^{7}	3
6	(Russia) M Youzhny	7^{9}	6

Semifinals
9	(United States) J-M Gambill	6	6
6	(Russia) M Youzhny	4	2

=== Bottom half ===
First round
8	(France) F Santoro	6	6
(Spain) F Mantilla	3	3
WC	(Switzerland) Y Allegro	3	2
Q	(Belgium) C Rochus	6	6
(Morocco) H Arazi	6	6
Q	(Germany) D Prinosil	2	3
(France) J Boutter	4	4
3	(Morocco) Y El Aynaoui	6	6
7	(France) N Escudé	6^{5}	2
(Austria) S Koubek	7^{7}	6
(Belarus) V Voltchkov	6	3	7
(South Korea) H-T Lee	4	6	5
Q	(Sweden) A Vinciguerra	2	6	6
WC	(Morocco) K Alami	6	4	1
(Italy) A Gaudenzi	3	4
2	(Spain) A Costa	6	6

Second round
8	(France) F Santoro	7	6^{8}	7
Q	(Belgium) C Rochus	5	7^{10}	5
(Morocco) H Arazi	4	6^{1}
3	(Morocco) Y El Aynaoui	6	7^{7}
(Austria) S Koubek	6	6
(Belarus) V Voltchkov	1	1
Q	(Sweden) A Vinciguerra	3	7^{7}	7
2	(Spain) A Costa	6	6^{5}	5

Quarterfinals
8	(France) F Santoro	6	3	3
3	(Morocco) Y El Aynaoui	3	6	6
(Austria) S Koubek	6	6
Q	(Sweden) A Vinciguerra	3	4

Semifinals
3	(Morocco) Y El Aynaoui	6^{1}	6^{5}
(Austria) S Koubek	7^{7}	7^{7}
