= 1998 Croatia Open Umag – Doubles =

Doubles
- 1998 Croatia Open Umag
- 1997 Champions: (Romania) Dinu Pescariu (Italy) Davide Sanguinetti

Final
- Champions: (United Kingdom) Neil Broad (South Africa) Piet Norval
- Runners-up: (Czech Republic) Jiří Novák (Czech Republic) David Rikl
- Score: 6–1, 3–6, 6–3

Details
- Draw: 16
- Seeds: 4

Events
| Singles | Doubles |
| ← 1997 · | Croatia Open | · 1999 → |

The 1998 Croatia Open Umag was a tennis tournament played on outdoor clay courts in Umag, Croatia that was part of the International Series of the 1998 ATP Tour. The tournament was held from July 27 through August 2, 1998.

== Seeds ==
Champion seeds are indicated in bold text while text in italics indicates the round in which those seeds were eliminated.

1. (United Kingdom) **Neil Broad** / (South Africa) **Piet Norval (champions)**
2. (Czech Republic) Jiří Novák / (Czech Republic) David Rikl (final)
3. (Netherlands) Sander Groen / (Hungary) Gábor Köves (first round)
4. (Italy) Massimo Ardinghi / (Italy) Vincenzo Santopadre (quarterfinals)

== Draw ==
=== Key ===
- Q = Qualifier
- WC = Wild card
- LL = Lucky loser
- Alt = Alternate
- ITF = ITF entry
- PR = Protected ranking
- SR = Special ranking
- SE = Special exempt
- JE = Junior exempt
- JR = Junior Accelerator Programme entrant
- CO = College Accelerator Programme entrant
- NG = Next Gen Accelerator Program entrant
- w/o = Walkover
- r = Retired
- d = Defaulted

=== Finals ===
First round
1 | (United Kingdom) **N Broad** **(South Africa) P Norval** | **6** | **7**
(Czech Republic) T Krupa (Slovenia) B Urh | 3 | 6
(Croatia) **I Karlović** **(Croatia) I Ljubičić** | **6** | **7**
(Mexico) Ó Ortiz (Argentina) M Puerta | 2 | 6
(Italy) **C Brandi** **(Brazil) K Carlsson** | **7** | **6**
3 | (Netherlands) S Groen (Hungary) G Köves | 5 | 4
(Spain) **C Martinez-Comet** **(Spain) M Roy-Girardi** | 5 | **7** | **7**
(Spain) E Nicolás (Spain) G Puentes | **7** | 6 | 6
(South Africa) **L Bale** **(South Africa) C Haggard** | 4 | **6** | **6**
(Czech Republic) L Friedl (Czech Republic) P Kovačka | **6** | 3 | 2
4 | (Italy) **M Ardinghi** **(Italy) V Santopadre** | **6** | **6**
(Spain) R Carretero (Spain) C Moyá | 0 | 3
(Romania) **D Pescariu** **(Italy) D Sanguinetti** | **6**
(Spain) JI Carrasco (Spain) J Velasco Jr. | 5 | R
2 | (Czech Republic) **J Novák** **(Czech Republic) D Rikl** | 5 | **6** | **6**
(Croatia) D Islambegovic (Croatia) E Rasberger | **7** | 3 | 2

Quarterfinals
1 | (United Kingdom) **N Broad** **(South Africa) P Norval** | 5 | **7** | **6**
(Croatia) I Karlović (Croatia) I Ljubičić | **7** | 5 | 3
(Italy) **C Brandi** **(Brazil) K Carlsson** | **6** | 3 | **6**
(Spain) C Martinez-Comet (Spain) M Roy-Girardi | 4 | **6** | 2
(South Africa) **L Bale** **(South Africa) C Haggard** | **7** | **7**
4 | (Italy) M Ardinghi (Italy) V Santopadre | 6 | 5
(Romania) D Pescariu (Italy) D Sanguinetti | 4 | 4
2 | (Czech Republic) **J Novák** **(Czech Republic) D Rikl** | **6** | **6**

Semifinals
1 | (United Kingdom) **N Broad** **(South Africa) P Norval** | **6** | **6**
(Italy) C Brandi (Brazil) K Carlsson | 3 | 4
(South Africa) L Bale (South Africa) C Haggard | 0 | 3
2 | (Czech Republic) **J Novák** **(Czech Republic) D Rikl** | **6** | **6**

Final
1 | (United Kingdom) **N Broad** **(South Africa) P Norval** | **6** | 3 | **6**
2 | (Czech Republic) J Novák (Czech Republic) D Rikl | 1 | **6** | 3
