= 2003 Qatar Open =

2003 Qatar ExxonMobil Open
- Date: 30 December 2002 – 5 January 2003
- Edition: 11th
- Category: International Series
- Draw: 32S / 16D
- Prize money: $975,000
- Surface: Hard / outdoor
- Location: Doha, Qatar
- Venue: Khalifa International Tennis Complex

Champions

Singles
- (Austria) Stefan Koubek

Doubles
- (Czech Republic) Martin Damm / (Czech Republic) Cyril Suk
- ATP Qatar Open

The 2003 Qatar Open, known as the 2003 Qatar ExxonMobil Open, for sponsorship reasons, was a men's tennis tournament played on outdoor hard courts at the Khalifa International Tennis Complex in Doha in Qatar and was part of the International Series of the 2003 ATP Tour. The tournament ran from 30 December 2002 through 5 January 2003. Unseeded Stefan Koubek won the singles title.

== Finals ==
=== Singles ===
(Austria) Stefan Koubek defeated (United States) Jan-Michael Gambill 6–4, 6–4

=== Doubles ===
(Czech Republic) Martin Damm / (Czech Republic) Cyril Suk defeated (The Bahamas) Mark Knowles / (Canada) Daniel Nestor 6–4, 7–6, [10–8]
