= 2002 Qatar Open – Doubles =

Doubles
- 2002 Qatar Open

Final
- Champions: (United States) Donald Johnson (United States) Jared Palmer
- Runners-up: (Czech Republic) Jiří Novák (Czech Republic) David Rikl
- Score: 6–3, 7–6^{(7–5)}

Details
- Draw: 16
- Seeds: 4

Events
| Singles | Doubles |
| ← 2001 · | ATP Qatar Open | · 2003 → |

Mark Knowles and Daniel Nestor were the defending champions but lost in the quarterfinals to Rainer Schüttler and Mikhail Youzhny.

Donald Johnson and Jared Palmer won in the final 6–3, 7–6^{(7–5)} against Jiří Novák and David Rikl.

== Seeds ==
1. (United States) Donald Johnson / (United States) Jared Palmer (champions)
2. (Czech Republic) Jiří Novák / (Czech Republic) David Rikl (final)
3. (The Bahamas) Mark Knowles / (Canada) Daniel Nestor (quarterfinals)
4. (Czech Republic) Petr Pála / (Czech Republic) Pavel Vízner (quarterfinals)

== Draw ==
=== Key ===
- Q = Qualifier
- WC = Wild card
- LL = Lucky loser
- Alt = Alternate
- SE = Special exempt
- PR = Protected ranking
- ITF = ITF entry
- JE = Junior exempt
- w/o = Walkover
- r = Retired
- d = Defaulted
- SR = Special ranking

First round
1 | (United States) D Johnson (United States) J Palmer | 6 | 6
(Spain) A Portas (Spain) F Vicente | 2 | 4
(Czech Republic) M Damm (Czech Republic) D Vacek | 6 | 7^{7}
WC | (Germany) L Burgsmüller (France) C Pioline | 2 | 6^{5}
3 | (The Bahamas) M Knowles (Canada) D Nestor | 6 | 6
(Sweden) S Aspelin (Sweden) P Nyborg | 2 | 2
WC | (Germany) R Schüttler (Russia) M Youzhny | 2 | 6 | 6
(Argentina) M García (Czech Republic) C Suk | 6 | 3 | 4
(South Africa) D Adams (Germany) M Kohlmann | 6 | 6
(Czech Republic) L Friedl (Czech Republic) R Štěpánek | 4 | 4
(South Africa) J-L de Jager (South Africa) R Koenig | 2 | 6 | 4
4 | (Czech Republic) P Pála (Czech Republic) P Vízner | 6 | 3 | 6
(Italy) A Gaudenzi (Czech Republic) B Ulihrach | 1 | 3
WC | (Morocco) K Alami (Morocco) Y El Aynaoui | 6 | 6
(Russia) Y Kafelnikov (Federal Republic of Yugoslavia) N Zimonjić | 4 | 4
2 | (Czech Republic) J Novák (Czech Republic) D Rikl | 6 | 6

Quarterfinals
1 | (United States) D Johnson (United States) J Palmer | 6 | 7
(Czech Republic) M Damm (Czech Republic) D Vacek | 4 | 5
3 | (The Bahamas) M Knowles (Canada) D Nestor | 4 | 3
WC | (Germany) R Schüttler (Russia) M Youzhny | 6 | 6
(South Africa) D Adams (Germany) M Kohlmann | 6 | 6^{5} | 6
4 | (Czech Republic) P Pála (Czech Republic) P Vízner | 3 | 7^{7} | 3
WC | (Morocco) K Alami (Morocco) Y El Aynaoui | 2 | 5
2 | (Czech Republic) J Novák (Czech Republic) D Rikl | 6 | 7

Semifinals
1 | (United States) D Johnson (United States) J Palmer | 6^{5} | 7 | 7
WC | (Germany) R Schüttler (Russia) M Youzhny | 7^{7} | 5 | 5
(South Africa) D Adams (Germany) M Kohlmann | 2 | 4
2 | (Czech Republic) J Novák (Czech Republic) D Rikl | 6 | 6

Final
1 | (United States) D Johnson (United States) J Palmer | 6 | 7^{7}
2 | (Czech Republic) J Novák (Czech Republic) D Rikl | 3 | 6^{5}
