= South African Airways Open =

The South African Airways Open may refer to:

- South African Airways Open (golf)
- South African Airways Open (tennis), an ATP Challenger Tour event held in East London, South Africa.
