= 2002 Qatar Open – Singles =

Singles
- 2002 Qatar Open

Final
- Champion: (Morocco) Younes El Aynaoui
- Runner-up: (Spain) Félix Mantilla
- Score: 4–6, 6–2, 6–2

Details
- Draw: 32
- Seeds: 8

Events
Singles	Doubles
← 2001 ·	ATP Qatar Open	· 2003 →

The Men's Singles tournament of the 2002 Qatar Open tennis championship took place in Doha, Qatar, between 31 December 2001 and 6 January 2002. 32 players from 17 countries competed in the 5-round tournament. The final winner was Younes El Aynaoui of Morocco, who defeated Félix Mantilla of Spain. The defending champion from 2001, Marcelo Ríos, did not compete.

== Seeds ==
1. (Russia) Yevgeny Kafelnikov (quarterfinals)
2. (Croatia) Goran Ivanišević (second round)
3. (Spain) Albert Portas (first round)
4. (Czech Republic) Jiří Novák (quarterfinals)
5. (Czech Republic) Bohdan Ulihrach (semifinals)
6. (Morocco) Younes El Aynaoui (champion)
7. (Germany) Rainer Schüttler (semifinals)
8. (Spain) Félix Mantilla (final)

== Draw ==
=== Key ===
- Q = Qualifier
- WC = Wild card
- LL = Lucky loser
- Alt = Alternate
- SE = Special exempt
- PR = Protected ranking
- ITF = ITF entry
- JE = Junior exempt
- w/o = Walkover
- r = Retired
- d = Defaulted
- SR = Special ranking

=== Finals ===
Semifinals
7	(Germany) Rainer Schüttler	3	4
6	(Morocco) Younes El Aynaoui	6	6
5	(Czech Republic) Bohdan Ulihrach	3	1
8	(Spain) Felix Mantilla	6	6

Final
6	(Morocco) Younes El Aynaoui	4	6	6
8	(Spain) Félix Mantilla	6	2	2

=== Top half ===
First round
1	(Russia) Y Kafelnikov	7^{7}	6
(Czech Republic) D Vacek	6^{0}	4
(Russia) N Davydenko	6	6
(Russia) M Youzhny	4	2
(Spain) D Sánchez	3	2
(Spain) A Montañés	6	6
(Finland) J Nieminen	3	2
7	(Germany) R Schüttler	6	6
4	(Czech Republic) J Novák	3	6	6
(Austria) M Hipfl	6	3	2
(France) A Dupuis	6	6
(Italy) A Gaudenzi	3	3
(Armenia) S Sargsian	0	2
(Argentina) F Squillari	6	6
WC	(France) C Pioline	6^{2}	4
6	(Morocco) Y El Aynaoui	7^{7}	6

Second round
1	(Russia) Y Kafelnikov	6^{4}	6	6
(Russia) N Davydenko	7^{7}	4	4
(Spain) A Montañés	3	4
7	(Germany) R Schüttler	6	6
4	(Czech Republic) J Novák	7	6
(France) A Dupuis	5	4
(Argentina) F Squillari	2	2
6	(Morocco) Y El Aynaoui	6	6

Quarterfinals
1	(Russia) Y Kafelnikov	5	4
7	(Germany) R Schüttler	7	6
4	(Czech Republic) J Novák	6^{2}	4
6	(Morocco) Y El Aynaoui	7^{7}	6

Semifinals
7	(Germany) R Schüttler	3	4
6	(Morocco) Y El Aynaoui	6	6

=== Bottom half ===
First round
5	(Czech Republic) B Ulihrach	6	6
(Spain) G Blanco	2	2
(Czech Republic) J Vacek	4	7^{7}	3
(Sweden) J Björkman	6	6^{2}	6
WC	(Morocco) K Alami	2	2
(Spain) F Vicente	6	6
Q	(Austria) J Knowle	6	1	7^{7}
3	(Spain) A Portas	4	6	6^{0}
8	(Spain) F Mantilla	6	6
Q	(Italy) C Caratti	1	1
WC	(Qatar) N-G Al-Khulaifi	1	2
Q	(Uzbekistan) O Ogorodov	6	6
Q	(Czech Republic) R Štěpánek	7^{7}	6
(Belgium) C Rochus	6^{5}	3
(Austria) S Koubek	4	6	3
2	(Croatia) G Ivanišević	6	3	6

Second round
5	(Czech Republic) B Ulihrach	6	7^{7}
(Sweden) J Björkman	2	6^{2}
(Spain) F Vicente	6	6
Q	(Austria) J Knowle	3	4
8	(Spain) F Mantilla	7^{7}	6
Q	(Uzbekistan) O Ogorodov	6^{0}	4
Q	(Czech Republic) R Štěpánek	7^{7}	6
2	(Croatia) G Ivanišević	6^{4}	2

Quarterfinals
5	(Czech Republic) B Ulihrach	6	6
(Spain) F Vicente	1	1
8	(Spain) F Mantilla	6	6
Q	(Czech Republic) R Štěpánek	3	3

Semifinals
5	(Czech Republic) B Ulihrach	3	1
8	(Spain) F Mantilla	6	6
