= 2003 Italian Open – Men's singles =

Men's singles
- 2003 Italian Open

Final
- Champion: (Spain) Félix Mantilla
- Runner-up: (Switzerland) Roger Federer
- Score: 7–5, 6–2, 7–6^{(10–8)}

Details
- Seeds: 16

Events
Singles	men	women
Doubles	men	women
- Italian Open

Félix Mantilla defeated Roger Federer in the final, 7–5, 6–2, 7–6^{(10–8)} to win the men's singles tennis title at the 2003 Italian Open.

Andre Agassi was the defending champion, but lost in the first round to David Ferrer.

== Seeds ==
A champion seed is indicated in bold text while text in italics indicates the round in which that seed was eliminated.

1. (United States) Andre Agassi (first round)
2. (Spain) Juan Carlos Ferrero (semifinals, retired due to a shoulder injury)
3. (Spain) Carlos Moyá (third round)
4. (Switzerland) Roger Federer (final)
5. (United States) Andy Roddick (second round)
6. (Russia) ~~Marat Safin~~ (withdrew due to a left wrist injury)
7. (Spain) Albert Costa (third round)
8. (Czech Republic) Jiří Novák (third round)
9. (Thailand) Paradorn Srichaphan (first round)
10. (Netherlands) Sjeng Schalken (first round)
11. (Argentina) David Nalbandian (first round)
12. (Germany) Rainer Schüttler (quarterfinals)
13. (France) Sébastien Grosjean (first round)
14. (Brazil) Gustavo Kuerten (first round)
15. (Argentina) Guillermo Coria (third round)
16. (Morocco) Younes El Aynaoui (first round)

== Draw ==
Key

- Q = Qualifier
- WC = Wild card
- LL = Lucky loser
- Alt = Alternate
- ITF = ITF entry
- PR = Protected ranking
- SR = Special ranking
- SE = Special exempt
- JE = Junior exempt
- JR = Junior Accelerator Programme entrant
- CO = College Accelerator Programme entrant
- NG = Next Gen Accelerator Program entrant
- w/o = Walkover
- r = Retired
- d = Defaulted

=== Finals ===
Quarterfinals
(Croatia) Ivan Ljubičić	**6**	3	4
(Spain) **Félix Mantilla**	3	**6**	**6**
(Russia) **Yevgeny Kafelnikov**	**6**	**7**
Q	(Netherlands) Martin Verkerk	3	5
WC	(Italy) Filippo Volandri	3	**7**	2
4	(Switzerland) **Roger Federer**	**6**	5	**6**
12	(Germany) Rainer Schüttler	4	4
2	(Spain) **Juan Carlos Ferrero**	**6**	**6**

Semifinals
(Spain) **Félix Mantilla**	4	**7^{7}**	**6**
(Russia) Yevgeny Kafelnikov	**6**	6^{3}	4
4	(Switzerland) **Roger Federer**	**6**	4
2	(Spain) Juan Carlos Ferrero	2	2^{r}

Final
(Spain) **Félix Mantilla**	**7**	**6**	**7^{10}**
4	(Switzerland) Roger Federer	5	2	6^{8}

=== Top half ===
==== Section 1 ====
First round
1	(United States) A Agassi	**6**	6^{3}	4
(Spain) **D Ferrer**	0	**7^{7}**	**6**
(Croatia) **I Ljubičić**	**6**	**6**
(Belgium) X Malisse	2	4
Q	(Romania) **V Hănescu**	**7^{7}**	**6**
(Russia) M Youzhny	6^{1}	3
(United Kingdom) T Henman	2	1
15	(Argentina) **G Coria**	**6**	**6**
11	(Argentina) D Nalbandian	3	**6**	0
(Spain) **F Mantilla**	**6**	1	**6**
(United States) **M Fish**	**7**	**7**
(France) F Santoro	5	5
WC	(Italy) D Sanguinetti	1	3
(France) **A Clément**	**6**	**6**
Q	(Croatia) Ž Krajan	4	5
7	(Spain) **A Costa**	**6**	**7**

Second round
(Spain) D Ferrer	2	3
(Croatia) **I Ljubičić**	**6**	**6**
Q	(Romania) V Hănescu	1	6^{6}
15	(Argentina) **G Coria**	**6**	**7^{8}**
(Spain) **F Mantilla**	**6**	**6**
(United States) M Fish	4	3
(France) A Clément	**7^{7}**	2	4
7	(Spain) **A Costa**	6^{3}	**6**	**6**

Third round
(Croatia) **I Ljubičić**	**6**	**6**
15	(Argentina) G Coria	4	3
(Spain) **F Mantilla**	**7**	4	**6**
7	(Spain) A Costa	5	**6**	1

Quarterfinals
(Croatia) I Ljubičić	**6**	3	4
(Spain) **F Mantilla**	3	**6**	**6**

==== Section 2 ====
First round
3	(Spain) **C Moyá**	**6**	**6**
(Spain) F Vicente	2	4
(Ecuador) N Lapentti	**6**	6^{3}	3
(Belarus) **M Mirnyi**	4	**7^{7}**	**6**
(United States) B Vahaly	5	**6**	3
WC	(Italy) **G Galimberti**	**7**	4	**6**
(Russia) **Y Kafelnikov**	**6**	1	**6**
16	(Morocco) Y El Aynaoui	1	**6**	4
9	(Thailand) P Srichaphan	1	2
(Finland) **J Nieminen**	**6**	**6**
(Russia) **N Davydenko**	2	**6**	**7**
(Slovakia) K Kučera	**6**	1	5
Q	(Netherlands) **M Verkerk**	**6**	**7^{7}**
(United States) V Spadea	3	6^{2}
WC	(Italy) A Gaudenzi	2	3
5	(United States) **A Roddick**	**6**	**6**

Second round
3	(Spain) **C Moyá**	**6**	**6**
(Belarus) M Mirnyi	4	4
WC	(Italy) G Galimberti	5	1
(Russia) **Y Kafelnikov**	**7**	**6**
(Finland) **J Nieminen**	**7**	4	**6**
(Russia) N Davydenko	5	**6**	1
Q	(Netherlands) **M Verkerk**	6^{6}	**6**	**6**
5	(United States) A Roddick	**7^{8}**	3	4

Third round
3	(Spain) C Moyá	4	6^{4}
(Russia) **Y Kafelnikov**	**6**	**7^{7}**
(Finland) J Nieminen	0	3
Q	(Netherlands) **M Verkerk**	**6**	**6**

Quarterfinals
(Russia) **Y Kafelnikov**	**6**	**7**
Q	(Netherlands) M Verkerk	3	5

=== Bottom half ===
==== Section 3 ====
First round
LL	(Chile) N Massú	**6**	2	1
WC	(Italy) **F Volandri**	1	**6**	**6**
(Netherlands) **R Sluiter**	**6**	4	**6**
(United States) J-M Gambill	4	**6**	2
(Czech Republic) **R Štěpánek**	**6**	1	**6**
(United States) J Blake	2	**6**	3
Q	(Spain) **A Martín**	2	**6**	**6**
10	(Netherlands) S Schalken	**6**	3	1
13	(France) S Grosjean	**7^{7}**	4	3
(Spain) **T Robredo**	6^{4}	**6**	**6**
(Argentina) **J I Chela**	**6**	**6**
(Belgium) O Rochus	1	1
(Argentina) **M Zabaleta**	**6**	**6**
(Spain) D Sánchez	4	2
(France) P-H Mathieu	3	5
4	(Switzerland) **R Federer**	**6**	**7**

Second round
WC	(Italy) **F Volandri**	**6**	**7**
(Netherlands) R Sluiter	1	5
(Czech Republic) **R Štěpánek**	**6**	**6**
Q	(Spain) A Martín	4	3
(Spain) **T Robredo**	**6**	**6**
(Argentina) J I Chela	2	0
(Argentina) M Zabaleta	6^{4}	2
4	(Switzerland) **R Federer**	**7^{7}**	**6**

Third round
WC	(Italy) **F Volandri**	**6**	**6**
(Czech Republic) R Štěpánek	3	4
(Spain) T Robredo	1	1
4	(Switzerland) **R Federer**	**6**	**6**

Quarterfinals
WC	(Italy) F Volandri	3	**7**	2
4	(Switzerland) **R Federer**	**6**	5	**6**

==== Section 4 ====
First round
8	(Czech Republic) **J Novák**	**6**	**6**
(Australia) W Arthurs	3	3
(Slovakia) **D Hrbatý**	**6**	**6**
Q	(Sweden) T Enqvist	3	3
(South Africa) **W Ferreira**	3	**6**	**6**
(Spain) F López	**6**	4	3
Q	(Sweden) M Norman	6^{7}	5
12	(Germany) **R Schüttler**	**7^{9}**	**7**
14	(Brazil) G Kuerten	3	**6**	4
(Argentina) **G Gaudio**	**6**	2	**6**
(Argentina) **A Calleri**	**6**	**6**
(Austria) S Koubek	2	2
Q	(Spain) A Portas	**6**	2	2
(Spain) **À Corretja**	3	**6**	**6**
Q	(Australia) M Philippoussis	6^{3}	4
2	(Spain) **J C Ferrero**	**7^{7}**	**6**

Second round
8	(Czech Republic) **J Novák**	**6**	**6**
(Slovakia) D Hrbatý	1	4
(South Africa) W Ferreira	6^{4}	2
12	(Germany) **R Schüttler**	**7^{7}**	**6**
(Argentina) **G Gaudio**	**6**	**6**
(Argentina) A Calleri	4	2
(Spain) À Corretja	4	4
2	(Spain) **J C Ferrero**	**6**	**6**

Third round
8	(Czech Republic) J Novák	4	6^{2}
12	(Germany) **R Schüttler**	**6**	**7^{7}**
(Argentina) G Gaudio	**7**	0	2
2	(Spain) **J C Ferrero**	5	**6**	**6**

Quarterfinals
12	(Germany) R Schüttler	4	4
2	(Spain) **J C Ferrero**	**6**	**6**
