= David Caballero =

Spanish tennis player (born 1974)

- Full name: David Caballero-García
- Country (sports): Spain
- Born: 14 November 1974 (age 50); Molina de Segura, Spain
- Height: 5 ft 11 in (180 cm)
- Plays: Right-handed
- Prize money: $64,042

Singles
- Career record: 1–1
- Highest ranking: No. 195 (23 November 1998)

Doubles
- Career record: 1–1
- Highest ranking: No. 298 (28 July 1997)

David Caballero-García (born 14 November 1974) is a former professional tennis player from Spain.

== Biography ==
Caballero, who comes from Molina de Segura in the Murcia region of Spain, began competing on the professional tennis tour in 1992.

A right-handed player, Caballero featured in the main draw of one ATP Tour tournament, the 1997 Croatia Open Umag. Playing as a qualifier in the singles draw he won his first round match over Orlin Stanoytchev, before losing in the round of 16 to eventual champion Félix Mantilla. He also competed in the doubles main draw with Juan Antonio Marin, to make the quarter-finals.

He reached his best singles ranking of 195 in the world in 1998.
