= 1998 Croatia Open Umag =

- Date: 27 July – 2 August
- Edition: 9th
- Category: World Series
- Draw: 32S / 16D
- Prize money: $375,000
- Surface: Clay / outdoor
- Location: Umag, Croatia

Champions

Singles
- (Czech Republic) Bohdan Ulihrach

Doubles
- (United Kingdom) Neil Broad / (South Africa) Piet Norval
← 1997 ·	Croatia Open	· 1999 →

The 1998 Croatia Open Umag was a men's tennis tournament played on outdoor clay courts in Umag, Croatia that was part of the World Series of the 1998 ATP Tour. It was the ninth edition of the tournament and was held from 27 July until 2 August 1998. Seventh-seeded Bohdan Ulihrach won the singles title.

== Finals ==
=== Singles ===
(Czech Republic) Bohdan Ulihrach defeated (Sweden) Magnus Norman, 6–3, 7–6^{(7–0)}

- It was Ulihrach's only title of the year and the 3rd of his career.

=== Doubles ===
(United Kingdom) Neil Broad / (South Africa) Piet Norval defeated (Czech Republic) Jiří Novák / (Czech Republic) David Rikl, 6–1, 3–6, 6–3

- It was Broad's 1st title of the year and the 6th of his career. It was Norval's only title of the year and the 8th of his career.

== See also ==
- 1998 Croatian Bol Ladies Open
