= Stefano Cobolli =

Italian tennis coach and former player

- Country (sports): Italy
- Born: 2 March 1977 (age 49) La Spezia, Italy
- Height: 5 ft 9 in (175 cm)
- Turned pro: 1995
- Retired: 2006 (Note: He played one more match in 2009.)
- Plays: Right-handed
- Prize money: $75,704

Singles
- Career record: 1–2
- Highest ranking: No. 236 (10 November 2003)

Grand Slam singles results
- Australian Open: Q1 (1995, 2004)
- French Open: Q1 (2004)
- Wimbledon: Q1 (2004)

Doubles
- Highest ranking: No. 340 (7 April 2003)

Stefano Cobolli (born 2 March 1977) is an Italian tennis coach and a former ATP professional player. He reached a career-high singles ranking on the professional tour of world No. 236.

== Professional career ==
A right-handed player from La Spezia, Cobolli turned professional in 1995.

His best performance on the ATP Tour came when he qualified for the main draw of the 1998 Croatia Open Umag and beat Tomáš Čatár from Slovakia in the first round, in three sets. He lost the second round, where he took Magnus Norman, No. 6 seed and an eventual finalist, who defeated Ivan Ljubičić in the previous round, to three sets.

== Coaching career ==
Cobolli is a coach at the Rome Tennis Academy. He is currently coaching his younger son, Flavio Cobolli, who is a top 10 player himself, with a career high singles ranking of No. 6.
