= 2003 Qatar Open – Doubles =

Doubles
- 2003 Qatar Open

Final
- Champions: (Czech Republic) Martin Damm; (Czech Republic) Cyril Suk
- Runners-up: (The Bahamas) Mark Knowles; (Canada) Daniel Nestor
- Score: 6–4, 7–6, [10–8]

Details
- Draw: 16
- Seeds: 4

Events
Singles	Doubles
- ATP Qatar Open

Donald Johnson and Jared Palmer were the defending champions but did not compete that year.

Martin Damm and Cyril Suk won in the final 6–4, 7–6, [10–8] against Mark Knowles and Daniel Nestor.

== Seeds ==
1. (The Bahamas) Mark Knowles / (Canada) Daniel Nestor (final)
2. (Czech Republic) Martin Damm / (Czech Republic) Cyril Suk (champions)
3. (Russia) Yevgeny Kafelnikov / (Czech Republic) Radek Štěpánek (first round)
4. (France) Julien Boutter / (France) Fabrice Santoro (first round)

== Draw ==
Key

- Q = Qualifier
- WC = Wild card
- LL = Lucky loser
- Alt = Alternate
- ITF = ITF entry
- PR = Protected ranking
- SR = Special ranking
- SE = Special exempt
- JE = Junior exempt
- JR = Junior Accelerator Programme entrant
- CO = College Accelerator Programme entrant
- NG = Next Gen Accelerator Program entrant
- w/o = Walkover
- r = Retired
- d = Defaulted

First round

Quarterfinals

Semifinals

Final

1
- (The Bahamas) M Knowles
- (Canada) D Nestor
6
6

- (South Africa) D Adams
- (South Africa) R Koenig
3
3

1
- (The Bahamas) M Knowles
- (Canada) D Nestor
6
3
7^{7}

- (Spain) D Ferrer
- (Spain) F López
6
6^{3}
4

- (Morocco) Y El Aynaoui
- (United States) J Tarango
0
6
6^{2}

- (Morocco) Y El Aynaoui
- (United States) J Tarango
2
7^{7}
6

1
- (The Bahamas) M Knowles
- (Canada) D Nestor
7^{7}
6

3
- (Russia) Y Kafelnikov
- (Czech Republic) R Štěpánek
4
1

- (France) N Escudé
- (Federal Republic of Yugoslavia) N Zimonjić
6^{4}
3

- (France) N Escudé
- (Federal Republic of Yugoslavia) N Zimonjić
6
6

- (France) N Escudé
- (Federal Republic of Yugoslavia) N Zimonjić
6
6

- (Belarus) V Voltchkov
- (Russia) M Youzhny
3
6^{4}

- (Switzerland) I Heuberger
- (South Korea) H-T Lee
3
3

- (Switzerland) I Heuberger
- (South Korea) H-T Lee
6
7^{7}

1
- (The Bahamas) M Knowles
- (Canada) D Nestor
4
6^{8}

- (Switzerland) Y Allegro
- (Germany) D Prinosil
7^{7}
3
6

2
- (Czech Republic) M Damm
- (Czech Republic) C Suk
6
7^{10}

- (United States) J-M Gambill
- (United States) G Oliver
6^{5}
6
3

- (Switzerland) Y Allegro
- (Germany) D Prinosil
6
6

WC
- (Morocco) K Alami
- (Morocco) H Arazi
7^{8}
3
7^{7}

WC
- (Morocco) K Alami
- (Morocco) H Arazi
1
3

4
- (France) J Boutter
- (France) F Santoro
6^{6}
6
6^{5}

- (Switzerland) Y Allegro
- (Germany) D Prinosil
4
6^{8}

- (Spain) D Sánchez
- (Spain) F Vicente
6
5
7

2
- (Czech Republic) M Damm
- (Czech Republic) C Suk
6
7^{10}

- (Italy) A Gaudenzi
- (Switzerland) M Kratochvil
3
7
5

- (Spain) D Sánchez
- (Spain) F Vicente
4
4

WC
- (Qatar) M Abdulla
- (Qatar) A Ibrahem
0
1

2
- (Czech Republic) M Damm
- (Czech Republic) C Suk
6
6

2
- (Czech Republic) M Damm
- (Czech Republic) C Suk
6
6
