= 1996 Croatia Open =

- Date: 12–18 August 1996
- Edition: 7th
- Category: World Series
- Draw: 32S / 16D
- Prize money: $375,000
- Surface: Clay / outdoor
- Location: Umag, Croatia
- Venue: ITC Stella Maris

Champions

Singles
- (Spain) Carlos Moyá

Doubles
- (Argentina) Pablo Albano / (Argentina) Luis Lobo
← 1995 ·	Croatia Open	· 1997 →

The 1996 Croatia Open was a men's tennis tournament played on outdoor clay courts at the ITC Stella Maris in Umag in Croatia and was part of the World Series of the 1996 ATP Tour. It was the seventh edition of the tournament and was held from 12 August through 18 August 1996. Fourth-seeded Carlos Moyá won the singles title.

== Finals ==
=== Singles ===
(Spain) Carlos Moyá defeated (Spain) Félix Mantilla 6–0, 7–6^{(7–4)}

- It was Moyá's only title of the year and the 2nd of his career.

=== Doubles ===
(Argentina) Pablo Albano / (Argentina) Luis Lobo defeated (Latvia) Ģirts Dzelde / (Austria) Udo Plamberger 6–4, 6–1

- It was Albano's 2nd title of the year and the 4th of his career. It was Lobo's 2nd title of the year and the 5th of his career.

== See also ==
- 1996 Croatian Bol Ladies Open
