= Mošnje =

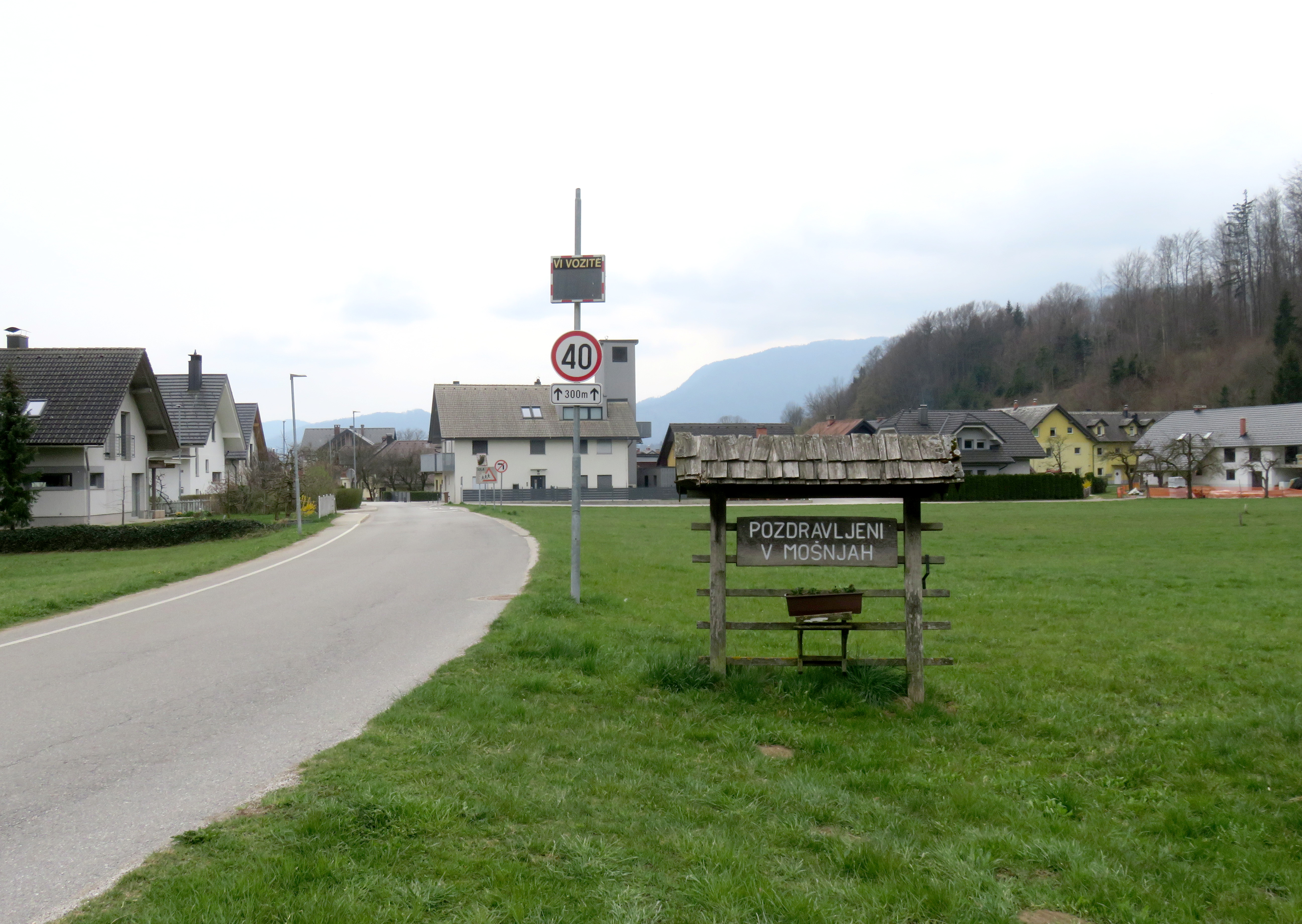

- Location in Slovenia
- Coordinates: 46°19′57.14″N 14°12′42.17″E
- Country: Slovenia
- Traditional region: Upper Carniola
- Statistical region: Upper Carniola
- Municipality: Radovljica
- Elevation: 453.5 m (1,488 ft)

Population (2002)
  - Total: 350

Mošnje (pronounced [ˈmoːʃnjɛ], German: Möschnach) is a village in the Municipality of Radovljica in the Upper Carniola region of Slovenia.

== History ==
During the Second World War, several houses in the village were burned. On April 4, 1944 the village's population was deported to Germany.

There is also the local museum in Mošnje and the remains of a recently excavated Roman villa rustica.

== Podvin Castle ==
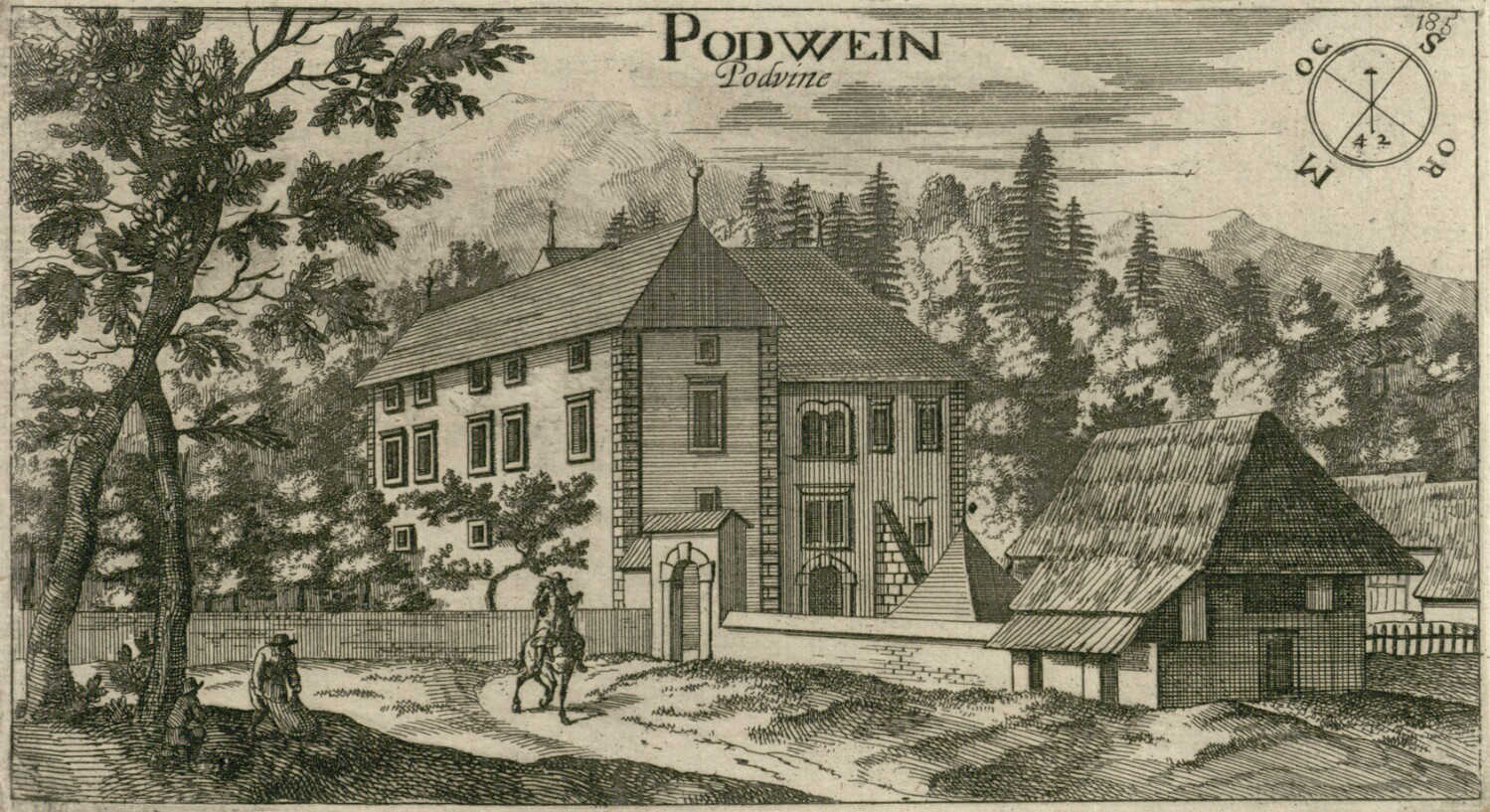
Podvin Castle in the 17th century

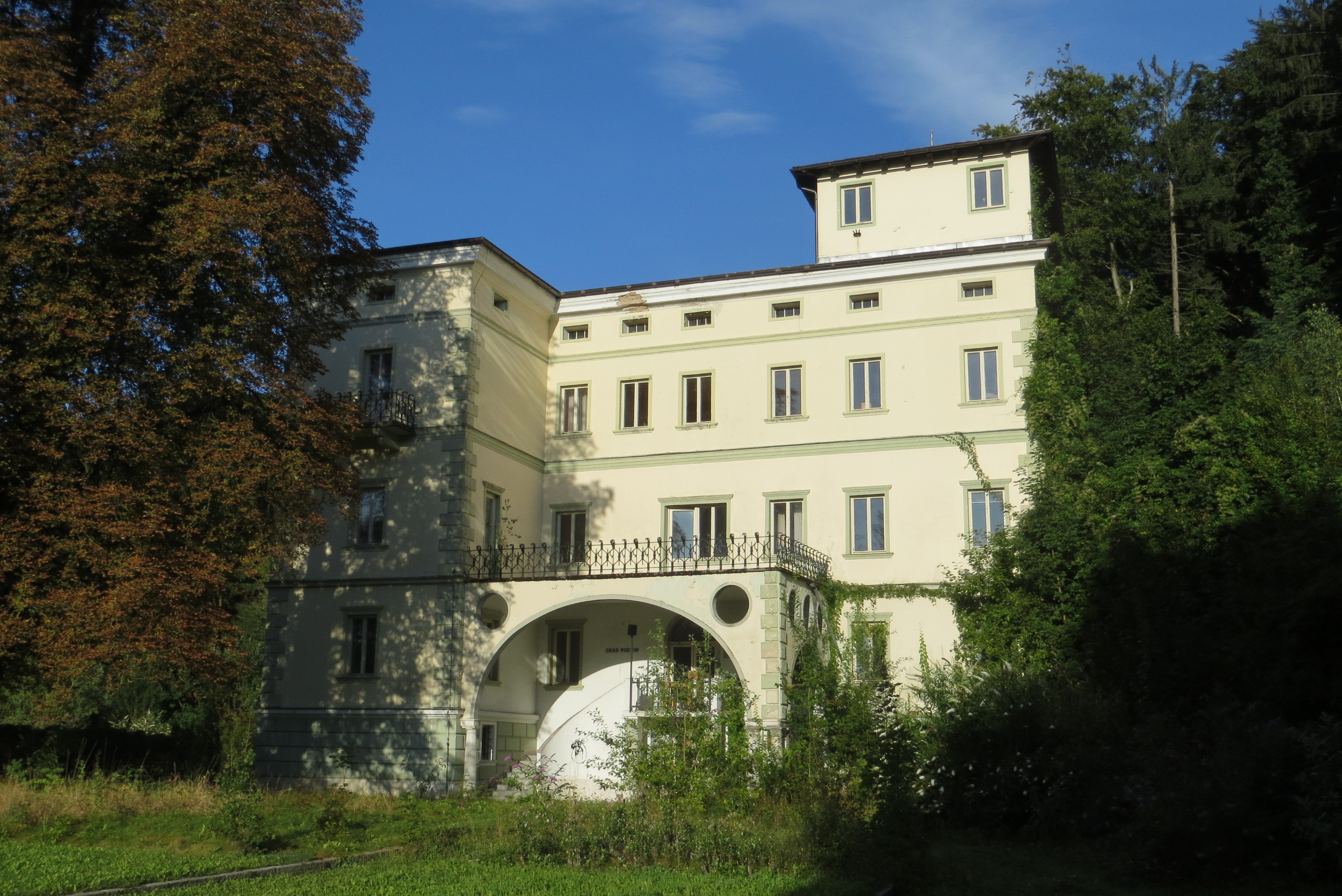
Podvin Castle today

Podvin Castle

Podvin Castle (German: Schloß Podwein) stands just north of the center of Mošnje. It belonged to the Counts of Podvin in the 14th century. The family died out in 1397, and it came under the ownership of the Counts of Lamberg and Wagen. The Polignac family, which was of French origin, were the last private owners of the castle. During their stewardship the castle was extensively altered. It was raised by a floor and the original roof was replaced by a flat one. The family left the castle in 1939. After the war the estate was nationalized.

The castle was further altered by the architect Anton Bitenc. His additions include balconies and an ahistorical tower structure in the north corner of the main building, concealing much of the original Renaissance appearance. For a time it hosted an agricultural school. Later it was used as a hotel and as a diplomatic venue. After the independence of Slovenia the heirs of the Polignac family did not ask for the return of the manor house and it continues to be used a hotel.

=== Mass graves ===
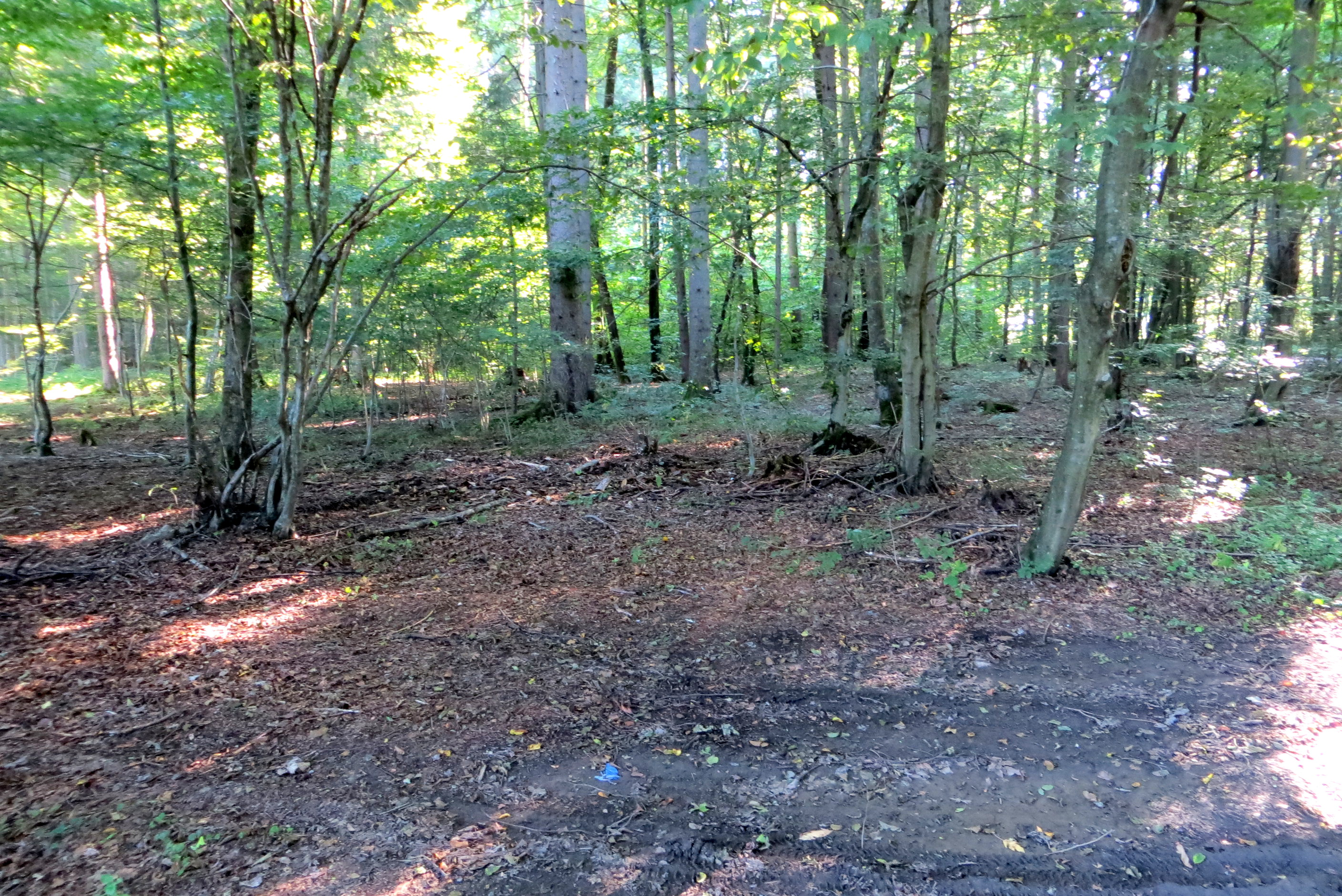
Foxtail Mass Grave

Mošnje is the site of three known mass graves from the period immediately after the Second World War. All three graves are located southwest of the settlement, above the Sava River. They contain the remains of about 300 German prisoners of war murdered between May 8 and 15, 1945. The Zgoša Mass Grave (Slovene: Grobišče Zgoša) lies in the woods, a few meters below a forest road and about 250 meters (820 ft) east of the railroad. The Hayfields Mass Grave (Grobišče Senožeta) is located along a path on the edge of the woods. The Foxtail Mass Grave (Grobišče Lisičji rep) lies in the woods, about 50 meters (160 ft) from a field.

== Church ==
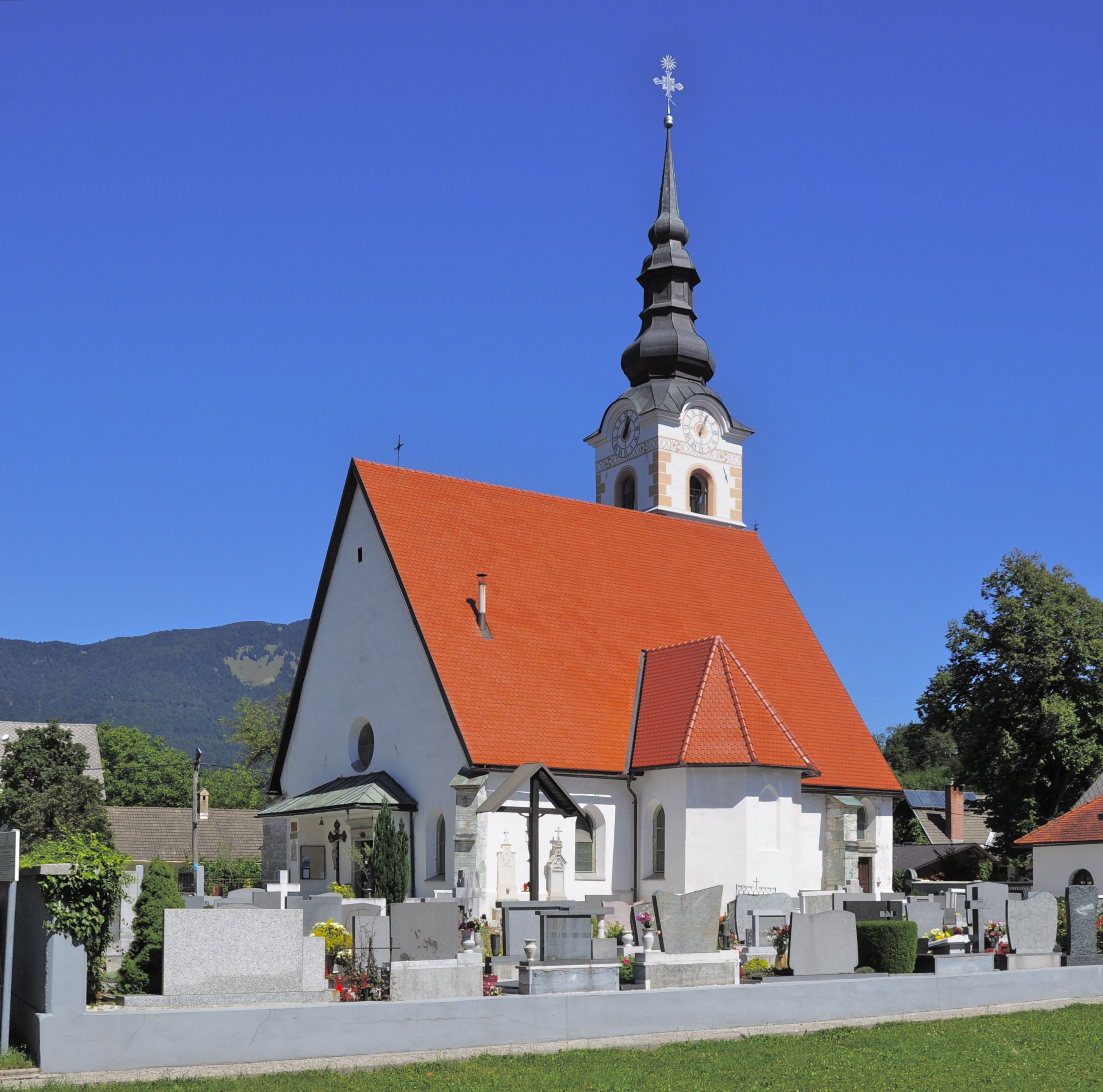
Saint Andrew's Church

The church in Mošnje is dedicated to Saint Andrew. Its chancel and the northern wall of the nave have frescoes from the 15th century. The church also contains a painting of the Virgin Mary by Fortunat Bergant.

== Notable people ==
Notable people that were born or lived in Mošnje include:

- Anton Berce (1860–1922), translator
- Josip Berce (1883–1914), technical writer, critic, and Romance language specialist
- Janez Mihelič (1750–1792), folk heritage collector
