= East London Challenger =

Tennis tournament

The East London Challenger, officially known as the South African Airways Open, was a tennis tournament held at Selbourne Park in East London, South Africa. It was played only in 2008, on outdoor hardcourts.

== Past finals ==
=== Singles ===
Year	Champion	Runner-up	Score
2008	(Croatia) Ivan Ljubičić	(Austria) Stefan Koubek	7–6^{(7—2)}, 6–2

==== Detailed draw ====
Quarterfinals
1	(Croatia) Ivan Ljubičić	5	7	6
5	(South Africa) Rik de Voest	7	6^{6}	3
3	(Sweden) Thomas Johansson	6	6
(France) Josselin Ouanna	2	4
6	(Portugal) Frederico Gil	6	6^{5}	7
(France) Gary Lugassy	3	7	5
(France) Jérémy Chardy	4	6	6^{2}
2	(Austria) Stefan Koubek	6	4	7

Semifinals
1	(Croatia) Ivan Ljubičić	7	7
3	(Sweden) Thomas Johansson	6^{1}	6^{3}
6	(Portugal) Frederico Gil	4	3
2	(Austria) Stefan Koubek	6	6

Final
1	(Croatia) Ivan Ljubičić	7	6
2	(Austria) Stefan Koubek	6^{2}	4

=== Doubles ===
Year	Champions	Runners-up	Score
2008	(Sweden) Jonas Björkman (Zimbabwe) Kevin Ullyett	(Sweden) Thomas Johansson (Austria) Stefan Koubek	6–2, 6–2

==== Detailed draw ====
Semifinals
1	(Sweden) Jonas Björkman (Zimbabwe) Kevin Ullyett	6	6
(Sweden) Johan Brunström (Sweden) Filip Prpic	1	1
3	(Sweden) Thomas Johansson (Austria) Stefan Koubek	6	7^{7}
2	(South Africa) Rik de Voest (South Africa) Wesley Moodie	4	6^{3}

Final
1	(Sweden) Jonas Björkman (Zimbabwe) Kevin Ullyett	6	6
3	(Sweden) Thomas Johansson (Austria) Stefan Koubek	2	2

== See also ==
- List of tennis tournaments
