= 1997 Croatia Open Umag =

- Date: 21–27 July
- Edition: 8th
- Category: World Series
- Draw: 32S / 16D
- Prize money: $375,000
- Surface: Clay / outdoor
- Location: Umag, Croatia

Champions

Singles
- (Spain) Félix Mantilla

Doubles
- (Romania) Dinu Pescariu / (Italy) Davide Sanguinetti
← 1996 ·	Croatia Open	· 1998 →

The 1997 Croatia Open Umag was a men's tennis tournament played on outdoor clay courts in Umag, Croatia that was part of the World Series of the 1997 ATP Tour. It was the eighth edition of the tournament and was held from 21 July until 27 July 1997. Third-seeded Félix Mantilla won the singles title.

== Finals ==
=== Singles ===
(Spain) Félix Mantilla defeated (Spain) Sergi Bruguera, 6–3, 7–5

- It was Mantilla's 3rd title of the year and the 4th of his career.

=== Doubles ===
(Romania) Dinu Pescariu / (Italy) Davide Sanguinetti defeated (Slovakia) Dominik Hrbatý / (Slovakia) Karol Kučera, 7–6, 6–4

- It was Pescariu's only career title. It was Sanguinetti's 1st career title.

== See also ==
- 1997 Croatian Bol Ladies Open
