= Sergi Durán =

Spanish tennis player (born 1976)

Sergi Duran
- Country (sports): Spain
- Born: 23 June 1976 (age 48)
- Plays: Right-handed
- Prize money: $33,135

Singles
- Career record: 0-2
- Career titles: 0
- Highest ranking: No. 321 (1 Feb 1999)

Grand Slam singles results
- Wimbledon: 1R (1997)

Doubles
- Career record: 0-1
- Career titles: 0
- Highest ranking: No. 281 (28 Jul 1997)

Sergi Durán Bernad (born 23 June 1976) is a former professional tennis player from Spain.

== Career ==
Duran was able to qualify for the 1997 Wimbledon Championships but had to battle hard in the qualification stages, winning his match against Gastón Etlis 9–7 in the final set and beating David Nainkin 11–9 in the deciding set. He faced British wildcard Andrew Richardson in the opening round and lost in straight sets.

He competed in the singles and doubles (with Gabriel Silberstein) at the Croatia Open that year but wasn't able to get past the first round in either. The Spaniard was defeated by Dominik Hrbatý in both matches, partnering Karol Kučera in the doubles.
