= Borut Urh =

Slovenian tennis player

- Country (sports): Slovenia
- Residence: Mošnje, Slovenia
- Born: 28 July 1974 (age 50); Ljubljana, Yugoslavia (current Slovenia)
- Height: 1.90 m (6 ft 3 in)
- Turned pro: 1993
- Retired: 2000
- Plays: Right-handed
- Prize money: $49,943

Singles
- Career record: 2–4 (33,3%)
- Career titles: 0
- Highest ranking: No. 281 (5 April 1999)

Grand Slam singles results
- Australian Open: -
- French Open: -
- Wimbledon: -
- US Open: -

Doubles
- Career record: 1–2 (50%)
- Career titles: 0 ATP, 2 Challengers
- Highest ranking: No. 160 (8 September 1997)
- Last updated on: 11 August 2009.

Borut Urh (born 28 July 1974) is a former professional tennis player from Slovenia. He achieved a career-high singles ranking of world No. 281 in 1999 and a career-high doubles ranking of world No. 160 in 1997.

Urh participated in 12 Davis Cup ties for Slovenia from 1993 to 2001, posting a 4–7 record in singles and a 7–2 record in doubles.

== Challengers finals ==
=== Doubles (2 titles) ===
No.	Date	Tournament	Surface	Partner	Opponents	Score
1.	1997	Plzeň, Czech Republic	Clay	(Czech Republic) Petr Pála	(Czech Republic) Radek Štěpánek (Czech Republic) Radomír Vašek	2–4, RET.
2.	1998	Nettingsdorf, Austria	Clay	(Czech Republic) Tomáš Krupa	(Czech Republic) Tomáš Cibulec (Czech Republic) Leoš Friedl	6–1, 6–4
