= Stefan Koubek =

Austrian tennis player (born 1977)

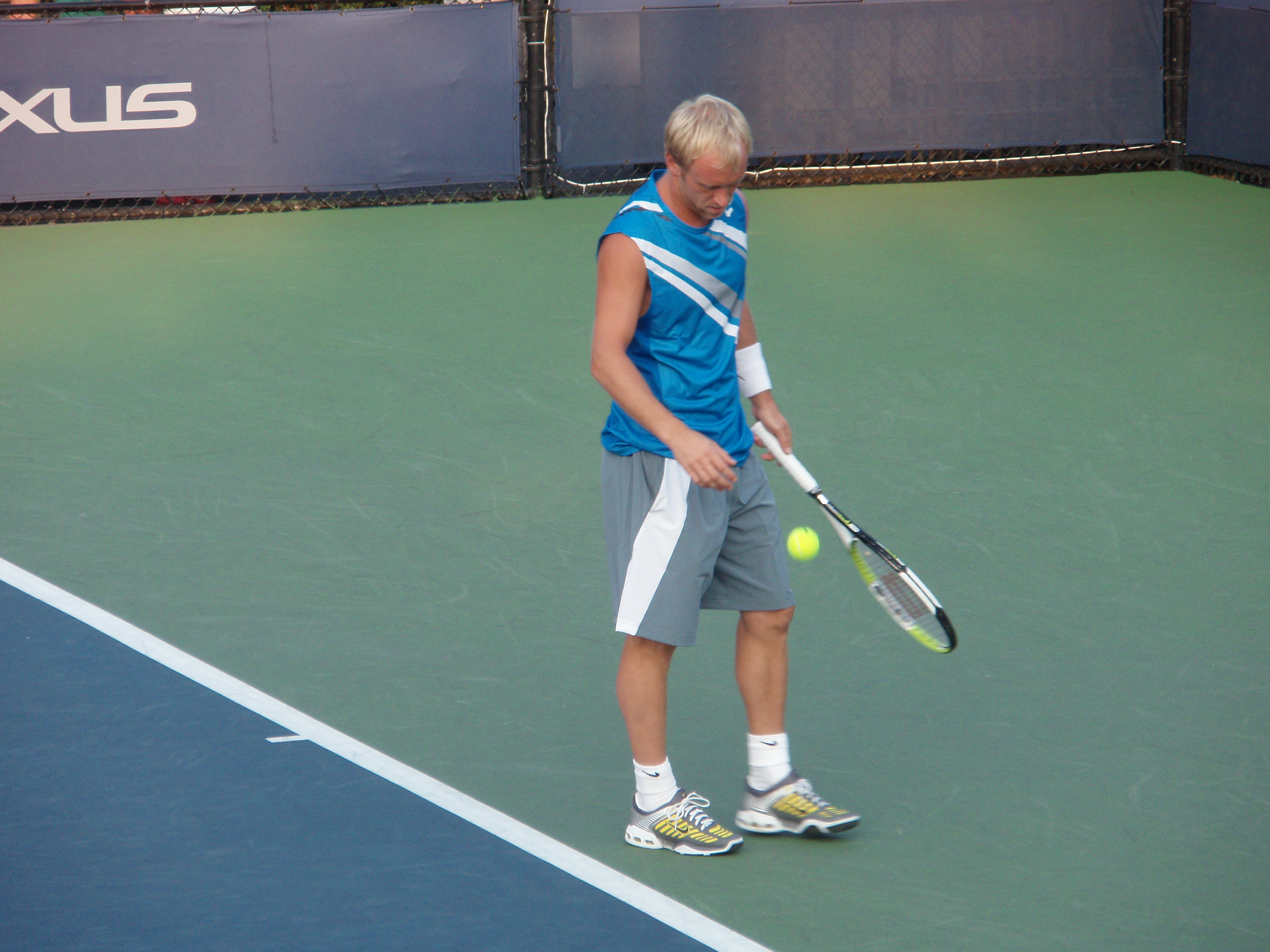
- Country (sports): Austria
- Residence: Vienna, Austria
- Born: 2 January 1977 (age 48); Klagenfurt, Austria
- Height: 1.75 m (5 ft 9 in)
- Turned pro: 1994
- Retired: 2011
- Plays: Left-handed (two-handed backhand)
- Prize money: $3,365,024

Singles
- Career record: 215–253
- Career titles: 3
- Highest ranking: No. 20 (13 March 2000)

Grand Slam singles results
- Australian Open: QF (2002)
- French Open: 4R (1999)
- Wimbledon: 2R (2000, 2002, 2003, 2004, 2009)
- US Open: 3R (2004, 2007)

Doubles
- Career record: 20–41
- Career titles: 1
- Highest ranking: No. 94 (23 July 2007)

Grand Slam doubles results
- Australian Open: 1R (2007, 2008)
- French Open: 1R (2007)
- Wimbledon: 1R (2009)
- US Open: 1R (2003, 2007)
- Last updated on: 17 April 2022.

Stefan Koubek (born 2 January 1977) is a retired tennis player from Austria. Koubek played left-handed with a double-handed backhand. His idol when growing up was Thomas Muster. Koubek won three titles, two of which came on hardcourts; despite this, he said his favorite surface was clay.

Koubek reached the quarterfinals of the 2002 Australian Open and the 2002 Hamburg Masters, attaining a career-high singles ranking of World No. 20 in March 2000. Koubek tested positive for glucocorticosteroids at the 2004 French Open after receiving an injection for an injured wrist; he was subsequently suspended for three months.

His nickname is Cooley or Stef.

== Early life ==
Koubek had his first experience on the tennis court as a 2.5-year-old, where his parents were playing as a hobby. He started practicing with a coach at the age of six on the Villacher Arbeitersportverein (VAS) courts in St. Martin, Villach. Koubek won his first smaller tournament at the age of nine and later won the national vice championship title in the U10 class. After completing his elementary and secondary school education in Villach, Koubek went to a business school in Klagenfurt for a year while training at Sportunion Klagenfurt. Koubek became a national indoors champion in the U16 class, gaining an entry into the Austrian Tennis Association.

== Tennis career ==
Koubek turned professional in 1994, losing his first match in St Pölten. Between 1994 and 1998, Koubek mostly played in ATP Futures and ATP Challenger Series events.

In 1997 he jumped up 184 positions in the rankings, thanks to good results in Challenger tournaments, reaching finals in Ulm and Alpirsbach. 1998 saw Koubek win his first Challenger event in Alpirsbach; later that same year he lost to Younes El Aynaoui in the final of Maia. Koubek compiled a 33–20 record for the year.

Koubek won his first ATP title in 1999 in Atlanta as a qualifier. He achieved this losing only one set in the whole tournament, overcoming Sébastien Grosjean in the final in straight sets. Koubek reached the fourth round in his French Open debut, losing to Àlex Corretja; to date, this is his best performance at this event. Koubek made the final of Bournemouth, losing to Adrian Voinea, and helped his country Austria back into the World Group of Davis Cup by defeating Sweden 3–2 in a promotion tie. Koubek was second only to Albert Costa in wins on clay during the 1999 season, with 28 match victories.

In 2000 Koubek won his second title in the hardcourts at Delray Beach, defeating Álex Calatrava. He reached the semi-finals at Mexico City, losing to Juan Ignacio Chela. He reached his highest singles rank to date on March 13, 2000, when he became World No. 20. At the 2000 French Open, in his match against Attila Sávolt (the score being 2-1 sets and 5-2 games in favour of his opponent), after having already received three warnings for various transgressions, Koubek was disqualified due to throwing his racket and accidentally hitting a ball boy.

Koubek started off 2002 with his best ever performance at a Grand Slam tournament by making the quarterfinals of the Australian Open. In the first round, Koubek came back from a 0–6 1–6 1–4 15–40 deficit to eventually defeat Cyril Saulnier, 0–6 1–6 7–6 6–4 8–6. In the next round, he again came back from two sets to love down against James Blake, winning in five sets. Koubek then defeated Kristian Pless and Fernando González in the third and fourth rounds, before losing to Jiří Novák in the quarterfinals.

In the remainder of 2002, Koubek's best result was a quarterfinal appearance at the Hamburg Masters, losing to Tommy Robredo. Koubek then finished the year with seven consecutive first-round losses.

Koubek rebounded in 2003 by winning his third career title in Doha. Koubek won the tournament without dropping a set, defeating Jan-Michael Gambill in the final, and briefly holding the top spot in the ATP Champions Race. Koubek's form remained inconsistent, again losing seven consecutive first-round matches after his victory in Doha, before making the semi-finals in Munich, where he lost to Roger Federer. In Davis Cup, Koubek defeated the Belgian brothers Christophe and Olivier Rochus to help return Austria to the World Group.

Koubek made the third round at the 2004 French Open before losing to David Nalbandian. In Thomas Muster's debut as Davis Cup captain, Koubek was instrumental in preserving Austria's status in the World Group, winning both singles matches over Tim Henman and Greg Rusedski.

Koubek tested positive for glucocorticosteroids at the 2004 French Open after receiving an injection for an injured wrist; he was subsequently suspended for three months. The ITF rejected Koubek's appeal of the suspension, but acknowledged that Koubek had not used the drugs to enhance performance. Koubek forfeited his points and prize money from Roland Garros, but his results before Roland Garros were not disqualified.

As a result of injuries and his suspension, Koubek struggled in 2005, and his ranking fell outside the top 100. Koubek spent most of the year playing events on the Challenger circuit. His best results on the tour were a third round in Kitzbühel, losing to Nicolás Massú, and a semifinal in the Helsinki Challenger, where he lost to Björn Rehnquist.

At the start of 2006, Koubek was ranked 182nd in the world. Koubek played a mixture of Challengers and ATP events during the year; as a qualifier, Koubek made the final of the ATP event in Zagreb, losing in straight sets to local favourite Ivan Ljubičić. Koubek reached the third round in Stuttgart and the Generali Open, and the semifinals in Mumbai. He finished the year ranked number 80. In doubles Koubek won his first title at the Generali Open with Philipp Kohlschreiber.

Koubek finished the 2007 season ranked in the top 50. The year began in 2007 by making the final in Chennai, losing to Xavier Malisse. At the Australian Open, he was knocked out in the first round by Wayne Arthurs, in Arthurs' final Australian Open appearance; Koubek lost the match despite leading two sets to love. He played in Austria's first-round defeat in Davis Cup, losing 4–1 to Argentina in Linz. In Sopot Koubek came back from a 6–0 4–0 deficit to defeat Agustín Calleri in three sets, where Calleri served for the match three times and saved five match points in the process, which broke a streak 21 consecutive games lost after losing 6–4 6–0 to Daniel Köllerer in Kitzbühel. Koubek was disqualified in Metz against Sébastien Grosjean while leading 4–2 in the final set after using abusive language to the tournament supervisor Thomas Karlberg while disputing a call. Koubek said he directed the "Fuck you" at the situation and not at Karlberg personally.

Koubek started 2008 by making the third round at the Australian Open before falling to Paul-Henri Mathieu in five sets, a match in which he led a break of serve in each set, but was not able to close the match out. In March Koubek suffered back problems and will have surgery to alleviate bulging discs, which is a potentially career threatening injury.

Koubek announced his retirement from tennis in May 2011.

== ATP career finals ==
=== Singles: 6 (3 titles, 3 runner-ups) ===
Legend Grand Slam Tournaments (0–0) ATP World Tour Finals (0–0) ATP Masters 1000 Series (0–0) ATP 500 Series (0–0) ATP 250 Series (3–3)	Finals by surface Hard (2–1) Clay (1–1) Grass (0–0) Carpet (0–1)	Finals by setting Outdoors (3–2) Indoors (0–1)

Result	W–L	Date	Tournament	Tier	Surface	Opponent	Score
Win	1–0	Apr 1999	Atlanta, United States	International Series	Clay	(France) Sébastien Grosjean	6–1, 6–2
Loss	1–1	Sep 1999	Bournemouth, United Kingdom	International Series	Clay	(Romania) Adrian Voinea	6–1, 5–7, 6–7^{(2–7)}
Win	2–1	Feb 2000	Delray Beach, United States	International Series	Hard	(Spain) Álex Calatrava	6–1, 4–6, 6–4
Win	3–1	Dec 2002	Doha, Qatar	International Series	Hard	(United States) Jan-Michael Gambill	6–4, 6–4
Loss	3–2	Jan 2006	Zagreb, Croatia	International Series	Carpet	(Croatia) Ivan Ljubičić	3–6, 4–6
Loss	3–3	Jan 2007	Chennai, India	International Series	Hard	(Belgium) Xavier Malisse	1–6, 3–6

=== Doubles: 2 (1 title, 1 runner-up) ===
Legend Grand Slam Tournaments (0–0) ATP World Tour Finals (0–0) ATP Masters Series (0–0) ATP Championship Series (0–0) ATP International Series (1–1)	Finals by surface Hard (1–1) Clay (0–0) Grass (0–0) Carpet (0–0)	Finals by setting Outdoors (1–1) Indoors (0–0)

Result	W–L	Date	Tournament	Tier	Surface	Partner	Opponents	Score
Loss	0–1	Jan 2004	Doha, Qatar	International Series	Hard	(United States) Andy Roddick	(Czech Republic) Martin Damm (Czech Republic) Cyril Suk	2–6, 4–6
Win	1–1	Jul 2006	Kitzbühel, Austria	International Series	Hard	(Germany) Philipp Kohlschreiber	(Austria) Oliver Marach (Czech Republic) Cyril Suk	6–2, 6–3

== ATP Challenger and ITF Futures finals ==
=== Singles: 7 (2–5) ===
Legend ATP Challenger (2–5) ITF Futures (0–0)	Finals by surface Hard (0–2) Clay (2–3) Grass (0–0) Carpet (0–0)

Result	W–L	Date	Tournament	Tier	Surface	Opponent	Score
Loss	0-1	Jul 1997	Ulm, Germany	Challenger	Clay	(Romania) Dinu-Mihai Pescariu	5–7, 1–6
Loss	0-2	Aug 1997	Alpirsbach, Germany	Challenger	Clay	(Italy) Fabio Maggi	4–6, 7–5, 4–6
Win	1-2	Sep 1998	Alpirsbach, Germany	Challenger	Clay	(Bulgaria) Orlin Stanoytchev	7–6, 6–4
Loss	1-3	Oct 1998	Oporto, Portugal	Challenger	Clay	(Morocco) Younes El Aynaoui	6–4, 3–6, 4–6
Win	2-3	Nov 1998	Lima, Peru	Challenger	Clay	(Argentina) Juan Ignacio Chela	6–3, 2–6, 6–0
Loss	2-4	Feb 2008	East London, South Africa	Challenger	Hard	(Croatia) Ivan Ljubičić	6–7^{(2–7)}, 4–6
Loss	2-5	Nov 2010	Bratislava, Slovakia	Challenger	Hard	(Slovakia) Martin Kližan	6–7^{(4–7)}, 2–6

=== Doubles: 1 (0–1) ===
Legend ATP Challenger (0–1) ITF Futures (0–0)	Finals by surface Hard (0–1) Clay (0–0) Grass (0–0) Carpet (0–0)

Result	W–L	Date	Tournament	Tier	Surface	Partner	Opponents	Score
Loss	0–1	Feb 2008	East London, South Africa	Challenger	Hard	(Sweden) Thomas Johansson	(Sweden) Jonas Björkman (Zimbabwe) Kevin Ullyett	2–6, 2–6

== Performance timeline ==
Key
W	F	SF	QF	#R	RR	Q#	DNQ	A	NH

(W) winner; (F) finalist; (SF) semifinalist; (QF) quarterfinalist; (#R) rounds 4, 3, 2, 1; (RR) round-robin stage; (Q#) qualification round; (DNQ) did not qualify; (A) absent; (NH) not held; (SR) strike rate (events won / competed); (W–L) win–loss record.

=== Singles ===
Tournament	1996	1997	1998	1999	2000	2001	2002	2003	2004	2005	2006	2007	2008	2009	2010	2011	SR	W–L	Win%
Grand Slam tournaments
Australian Open	A	A	A	1R	3R	2R	QF	1R	1R	A	Q2	1R	3R	2R	3R	Q2	0 / 10	12–10	55%
French Open	A	Q2	A	4R	2R	1R	1R	2R	3R	1R	Q2	2R	A	1R	Q1	A	0 / 9	8–9	47%
Wimbledon	A	A	A	1R	2R	1R	2R	2R	2R	1R	A	1R	A	2R	1R	A	0 / 10	5–10	33%
US Open	A	A	A	1R	2R	1R	1R	2R	3R	1R	1R	3R	A	Q3	Q2	A	0 / 9	6–9	40%
Win–loss	0–0	0–0	0–0	3–4	5–4	1–4	5–4	3–4	5–4	0–3	0–1	3–4	2–1	2–3	2–2	0–0	0 / 38	31–38	45%
ATP World Tour Masters 1000
Indian Wells	A	A	A	A	1R	1R	2R	1R	Q2	A	Q1	1R	A	A	1R	Q1	0 / 6	1–6	14%
Miami	A	Q1	Q1	A	2R	1R	1R	1R	2R	1R	Q2	1R	1R	1R	Q2	A	0 / 9	1–9	10%
Monte Carlo	A	A	A	A	1R	A	2R	1R	A	Q2	A	A	A	A	Q1	A	0 / 3	1–3	25%
Rome	A	A	A	A	1R	A	1R	1R	1R	A	A	A	A	A	A	A	0 / 4	0–4	0%
Hamburg Masters	Q3	A	A	A	1R	1R	QF	1R	Q1	A	Q1	Q2	A	A	A	A	0 / 4	3–4	43%
Madrid	Not Held						1R	A	2R	A	A	3R	A	A	A	A	0 / 3	3–3	50%
Canada	A	A	A	A	2R	A	3R	A	A	A	A	A	A	A	A	A	0 / 2	3–2	60%
Cincinnati	A	A	A	A	3R	3R	1R	1R	A	1R	A	A	A	A	A	A	0 / 5	4–5	44%
Stuttgart	A	A	A	Q2	A	2R	A	A	A	A	A	A	A	A	A	A	0 / 1	1–1	50%
Paris	A	A	A	2R	A	A	1R	Q1	A	Q2	Q1	A	A	A	A	A	0 / 2	1–2	33%
Win–loss	0–0	0–0	0–0	1–1	3–7	3–5	7–9	0–6	2–3	0–2	0–0	2–3	0–1	0–1	0–1	0–0	0 / 39	18–39	32%
