= David Rikl =

Czech tennis player (born 1971)

- Country (sports): Czech Republic; Czechoslovakia
- Residence: London, England
- Born: 27 February 1971 (age 55) Brandýs, Czechoslovakia
- Height: 1.78 m (5 ft 10 in)
- Turned pro: 1989
- Retired: 2005
- Plays: Left-handed (two-handed backhand)
- Prize money: $3,063,257

Singles
- Career record: 54–94
- Career titles: 0
- Highest ranking: No. 41 (2 May 1994)

Grand Slam singles results
- Australian Open: 2R (1994)
- French Open: 2R (1994, 1995, 1996)
- Wimbledon: 3R (1997)
- US Open: 2R (1996)

Doubles
- Career record: 390–232
- Career titles: 30
- Highest ranking: No. 4 (20 August 2001)

Grand Slam doubles results
- Australian Open: QF (2000, 2003)
- French Open: SF (2003)
- Wimbledon: F (2001)
- US Open: F (2004)

David Rikl (born 27 February 1971) is a former professional tennis player from the Czech Republic. His success came mostly in doubles, winning 30 titles and finishing runner-up at the 2004 US Open and 2001 Wimbledon Championships Doubles events. He also achieved a singles ranking of world No. 41 in May 1994.

== Tennis career ==
=== Juniors ===
As a junior Rikl excelled at doubles, reaching the semi-finals of the French Open and Australian Open and the final of Wimbledon.

Junior Grand Slam results – Singles:

Australian Open: 3R (1989)
French Open: 2R (1989)
Wimbledon: 2R (1989)
US Open: 1R (1988)

Junior Grand Slam results – Doubles:

Australian Open: SF (1989)
French Open: SF (1984)
Wimbledon: F (1983)
US Open: 1R (1988)

=== Pro tour ===
Rikl turned professional in 1989.

In singles, he won five Challenger tournaments and achieved his greatest slam performance in 1997, reaching the third round of Wimbledon.

Rikl retired from the professional tour in 2005 and currently resides in London.

=== Partnership with Jiří Novák ===
Rikl won most of his titles in the late 1990s and early 2000s with compatriot Jiří Novák. He and Novák made a run to the 2001 Wimbledon Championships finals, losing to Donald Johnson and Jared Palmer in four sets. Rikl won 14 of his titles with Novák, the pair winning 9 of Rikl's titles consecutively.

=== Personal life ===
David is married to a former tennis player Adriana Gerši. David's son Patrik also plays tennis.

== Grand Slam finals ==
=== Doubles (2 runner-ups) ===
Result	Year	Championship	Surface	Partner	Opponents	Score
Loss	2001	Wimbledon	Grass	(Czech Republic) Jiří Novák	(United States) Donald Johnson (United States) Jared Palmer	4–6, 6–4, 3–6, 6–7
Loss	2004	US Open	Hard	(India) Leander Paes	(The Bahamas) Mark Knowles (Canada) Daniel Nestor	3–6, 3–6

== Career finals ==
=== Doubles (30 titles, 22 runner-ups) ===
Legend Grand Slam (0) Tennis Masters Cup (0) ATP Masters Series (4) ATP International Series Gold (4) ATP International Series (22)	Titles by surface Hard (8) Clay (17) Grass (3) Carpet (2)

Result	W/L	Date	Tournament	Surface	Partner	Opponents	Score
Win	1–0	Feb 1991	Tel Aviv, Israel	Hard	(Netherlands) Michiel Schapers	(Argentina) Javier Frana (Mexico) Leonardo Lavalle	6–2, 6–7, 6–3
Win	2–0	Jul 1992	Newport, Rhode Island	Grass	(South Africa) Royce Deppe	(United States) Paul Annacone (United States) David Wheaton	6–4, 6–4
Loss	2–1	Oct 1992	Basel, Switzerland	Hard (i)	(Czechoslovakia) Karel Nováček	(Netherlands) Tom Nijssen (Czechoslovakia) Cyril Suk	3–6, 4–6
Loss	2–2	Mar 1993	Zaragoza	Carpet	(United States) Mike Bauer	(Czech Republic) Martin Damm (Czech Republic) Karel Nováček	6–2, 4–6, 5–7
Loss	2–3	Oct 1993	Tel Aviv, Israel	Hard	(United States) Mike Bauer	(Spain) Sergio Casal (Spain) Emilio Sánchez	4–6, 4–6
Win	3–3	Oct 1993	Santiago, Chile	Clay	(United States) Mike Bauer	(Sweden) Christer Allgårdh (United States) Brian Devening	7–6, 6–4
Win	4–3	Apr 1994	Barcelona, Spain	Clay	(Russia) Yevgeny Kafelnikov	(United States) Jim Courier (Spain) Javier Sánchez	5–7, 6–1, 6–4
Win	5–3	Apr 1994	Munich, Germany	Clay	(Russia) Yevgeny Kafelnikov	(Germany) Boris Becker (Czech Republic) Petr Korda	7–6, 7–5
Win	6–3	May 1994	Rome, Italy	Clay	(Russia) Yevgeny Kafelnikov	(South Africa) Wayne Ferreira (Spain) Javier Sánchez	6–1, 7–5
Win	7–3	Oct 1994	Vienna, Austria	Carpet (i)	(United States) Mike Bauer	(Austria) Alex Antonitsch (United Kingdom) Greg Rusedski	7–6, 6–4
Loss	7–4	Aug 1995	Prague, Czech Republic	Clay	(Czech Republic) Jiří Novák	(Czech Republic) Libor Pimek (South Africa) Byron Talbot	5–7, 6–1, 6–7
Win	8–4	Sep 1995	Bogotá, Colombia	Clay	(Czech Republic) Jiří Novák	(United States) Steve Campbell (United States) MaliVai Washington	7–6, 6–2
Win	9–4	Oct 1995	Santiago, Chile	Clay	(Czech Republic) Jiří Novák	(United States) Shelby Cannon (United States) Francisco Montana	6–4, 4–6, 6–1
Loss	9–5	Nov 1995	Montevideo, Uruguay	Clay	(Czech Republic) Jiří Novák	(Spain) Emilio Sánchez (Spain) Sergio Casal	6–2, 6–7, 6–7
Loss	9–6	Nov 1995	Buenos Aires, Argentina	Clay	(Czech Republic) Jiří Novák	(United States) Vince Spadea (South Africa) Christo van Rensburg	3–6, 3–6
Win	10–6	Mar 1996	Casablanca, Morocco	Clay	(Czech Republic) Jiří Novák	(Spain) Tomás Carbonell (Spain) Francisco Roig	7–6, 6–3
Win	11–6	Sep 1996	Bogotá, Colombia	Clay	(Venezuela) Nicolás Pereira	(Ecuador) Pablo Campana (Ecuador) Nicolás Lapentti	6–3, 7–6
Loss	11–7	Nov 1996	Moscow, Russia	Carpet (i)	(Czech Republic) Jiří Novák	(United States) Rick Leach (Russia) Andrei Olhovskiy	6–4, 1–6, 2–6
Win	12–7	Oct 1997	Ostrava, Czech Republic	Carpet (i)	(Czech Republic) Jiří Novák	(United States) Donald Johnson (United States) Francisco Montana	6–2, 6–4
Win	13–7	Aug 1998	San Marino	Clay	(Czech Republic) Jiří Novák	(Argentina) Mariano Hood (Argentina) Sebastián Prieto	6–4, 7–6
Loss	13–8	Aug 1998	Umag, Croatia	Clay	(Czech Republic) Jiří Novák	(United Kingdom) Neil Broad (South Africa) Pieter Norval	1–6, 6–3, 3–6
Win	14–8	Aug 1998	Indianapolis, Indiana, U.S.	Hard	(Czech Republic) Jiří Novák	(The Bahamas) Mark Knowles (Canada) Daniel Nestor	6–2, 7–6
Loss	14–9	Oct 1998	Mallorca, Spain	Clay	(Czech Republic) Jiří Novák	(Argentina) Pablo Albano (Argentina) Daniel Orsanic	6–7, 3–6
Win	15–9	Nov 1998	Mexico City, Mexico	Clay	(Czech Republic) Jiří Novák	(Argentina) Daniel Orsanic (Mexico) David Roditi	6–4, 6–2
Loss	15–10	Jan 1999	Auckland, New Zealand	Hard	(Czech Republic) Jiří Novák	(United States) Jeff Tarango (Czech Republic) Daniel Vacek	5–7, 5–7
Loss	15–11	Apr 1999	Estoril, Portugal	Clay	(Czech Republic) Jiří Novák	(Spain) Tomás Carbonell (United States) Donald Johnson	3–6, 6–2, 1–6
Loss	15–12	Apr 1999	Monte Carlo, Monaco	Clay	(Czech Republic) Jiří Novák	(France) Olivier Delaître (United Kingdom) Tim Henman	2–6, 3–6
Loss	15–13	Oct 1999	Basle, Switzerland	Carpet (i)	(Czech Republic) Jiří Novák	(North Macedonia) Aleksandar Kitinov (South Africa) Brent Haygarth	6–0, 4–6, 5–7
Win	16–13	Feb 2000	Dubai, UAE	Hard	(Czech Republic) Jiří Novák	(South Africa) Robbie Koenig (Australia) Peter Tramacchi	6–2, 7–5
Win	17–13	Jul 2000	Gstaad, Switzerland	Hard	(Czech Republic) Jiří Novák	(France) Jérôme Golmard (Germany) Michael Kohlmann	3–6, 6–3, 6–4
Win	18–13	Jul 2000	Stuttgart Outdoor, Germany	Clay	(Czech Republic) Jiří Novák	(Argentina) Lucas Arnold (United States) Donald Johnson	5–7, 6–2, 6–3
Win	19–13	Oct 2000	Stuttgart Indoor, Germany	Hard	(Czech Republic) Jiří Novák	(United States) Donald Johnson (South Africa) Piet Norval	3–6, 6–3, 6–4
Loss	19–14	Oct 2000	Vienna, Austria	Hard	(Czech Republic) Jiří Novák	(Russia) Yevgeny Kafelnikov (Socialist Federal Republic of Yugoslavia) Nenad Zimonjić	4–6, 4–6
Loss	19–15	Oct 2000	Moscow, Russia	Carpet (i)	(Czech Republic) Jiří Novák	(Sweden) Jonas Björkman (Germany) David Prinosil	2–6, 3–6
Loss	19–16	Feb 2001	Copenhagen, Denmark	Hard	(Czech Republic) Jiří Novák	(Zimbabwe) Wayne Black (South Africa) Kevin Ullyett	3–6, 3–6
Win	20–16	Mar 2001	Miami, U.S.	Hard	(Czech Republic) Jiří Novák	(Sweden) Jonas Björkman (Australia) Todd Woodbridge	7–5, 7–6
Win	21–16	May 2001	Saint Poelten, Austria	Clay	(Czech Republic) Petr Pála	(Brazil) Jaime Oncins (Argentina) Daniel Orsanic	6–3, 5–7, 7–5
Loss	12.	Jul 2001	Wimbledon, UK	Grass	(Czech Republic) Jiří Novák	(United States) Donald Johnson (United States) Jared Palmer	4–6, 6–4, 3–6, 6–7^{(6–8)}
Win	22.	Jul 2001	Montreal, Canada	Hard	(Czech Republic) Jiří Novák	(United States) Donald Johnson (United States) Jared Palmer	6–4, 3–6, 6–3
Loss	13.	Oct 2001	Vienna, Austria	Hard	(Czech Republic) Jiří Novák	(Czech Republic) Martin Damm (Czech Republic) Radek Štěpánek	3–6, 2–6
Loss	14.	Jan 2002	Doha, Qatar	Hard	(Czech Republic) Jiří Novák	(United States) Donald Johnson (United States) Jared Palmer	3–6, 6–7^{(5–7)}
Loss	15.	Mar 2002	Acapulco	Clay	(Czech Republic) Martin Damm	(United States) Bob Bryan (United States) Mike Bryan	1–6, 6–3, [2–10]
Win	23.	May 2002	Saint Poelten, Austria	Clay	(Czech Republic) Petr Pála	(United States) Mike Bryan (Australia) Michael Hill	7–5, 6–4
Win	24.	Jun 2002	Gstaad, Switzerland	Clay	(Australia) Joshua Eagle	(Italy) Massimo Bertolini (Italy) Cristian Brandi	7–6, 6–4
Win	25.	Jun 2002	Halle, Germany	Grass	(Germany) David Prinosil	(Sweden) Jonas Björkman (Australia) Todd Woodbridge	4–6, 7–6, 7–5
Win	26.	Jul 2002	Stuttgart Outdoor, Germany	Clay	(Australia) Joshua Eagle	(South Africa) David Adams (Argentina) Gastón Etlis	6–3, 6–4
Win	27.	Feb 2003	Dubai, UAE	Hard	(India) Leander Paes	(Zimbabwe) Wayne Black (Zimbabwe) Kevin Ullyett	6–3, 6–0
Loss	19.	Apr 2003	Miami, US	Hard	(India) Leander Paes	(Switzerland) Roger Federer (Belarus) Max Mirnyi	5–7, 3–6
Win	28.	Jul 2003	Gstaad, Switzerland	Clay	(India) Leander Paes	(Czech Republic) František Čermák (Czech Republic) Leoš Friedl	6–3, 6–3
Win	29.	Jun 2004	Halle, Germany	Grass	(India) Leander Paes	(Czech Republic) Tomáš Cibulec (Czech Republic) Petr Pála	6–2, 7–5
Win	30.	Jul 2004	Gstaad, Switzerland	Clay	(India) Leander Paes	(Switzerland) Marc Rosset (Switzerland) Stanislas Wawrinka	6–4, 6–2
Loss	20.	Sep 2004	New York, US	Hard	(India) Leander Paes	(The Bahamas) Mark Knowles (Canada) Daniel Nestor	3–6, 3–6

== Doubles performance timeline ==
Key
W	F	SF	QF	#R	RR	Q#	DNQ	A	NH

(W) winner; (F) finalist; (SF) semifinalist; (QF) quarterfinalist; (#R) rounds 4, 3, 2, 1; (RR) round-robin stage; (Q#) qualification round; (DNQ) did not qualify; (A) absent; (NH) not held; (SR) strike rate (events won / competed); (W–L) win–loss record.

Tournament	1987	1988	1989	1990	1991	1992	1993	1994	1995	1996	1997	1998	1999	2000	2001	2002	2003	2004	2005	SR	W–L
Grand Slam tournaments
Australian Open	A	A	A	A	A	A	A	1R	1R	A	A	A	2R	QF	2R	2R	QF	A	A	0 / 7	9–7
French Open	A	A	A	3R	A	1R	2R	2R	2R	1R	1R	2R	3R	QF	3R	3R	SF	2R	1R	0 / 15	20–15
Wimbledon	A	A	A	1R	A	1R	A	3R	A	2R	2R	1R	2R	3R	F	QF	SF	2R	1R	0 / 13	20–13
US Open	A	A	A	A	A	A	1R	1R	2R	1R	QF	2R	3R	1R	3R	2R	1R	F	A	0 / 12	15–12
Win–loss	0–0	0–0	0–0	2–2	0–0	0–2	1–2	3–4	2–3	1–3	4–3	2–3	6–4	8–4	10–4	7–4	11–4	7–3	0–2	0 / 47	64–47
Masters Series
Indian Wells	NME			A	A	A	A	A	A	A	A	A	QF	1R	1R	2R	SF	1R	A	0 / 6	5–6
Miami	NME			A	A	A	A	1R	3R	A	3R	A	2R	QF	W	2R	F	QF	1R	1 / 10	15–9
Monte Carlo	NME			1R	A	A	A	1R	QF	2R	A	A	F	QF	QF	2R	2R	A	A	0 / 9	12–9
Rome	NME			1R	A	A	A	W	A	A	A	A	1R	1R	2R	1R	2R	2R	A	1 / 8	7–7
Hamburg	NME			1R	A	A	A	A	A	QF	A	A	QF	QF	1R	1R	SF	SF	A	0 / 8	11–8
Canada	NME			A	A	A	A	1R	A	A	A	A	1R	1R	W	SF	QF	2R	A	1 / 7	10–6
Cincinnati	NME			A	A	A	A	1R	A	A	A	A	1R	SF	QF	2R	2R	A	A	0 / 6	6–6
Madrid (Stuttgart)	NME			A	A	A	A	A	A	A	A	A	2R	W	SF	2R	SF	1R	A	1 / 6	10–5
Paris	NME			A	A	A	A	A	A	A	A	A	1R	2R	2R	1R	1R	1R	A	0 / 6	0–6
Win–loss	N/A			0–3	0–0	0–0	0–0	5–4	4–2	3–2	1–1	0–0	9–9	13–8	16–7	7–9	11–9	7–7	0–1	4 / 66	76–62
Year-end ranking	894	676	220	122	109	71	99	27	49	53	54	43	29	11	7	20	14	23	499		
