= Félix Mantilla (tennis) =

Spanish tennis player

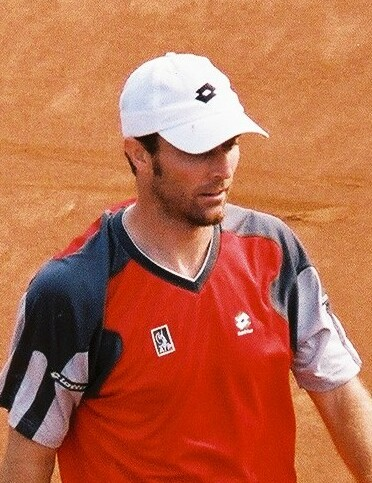
- Country (sports): Spain
- Residence: Barcelona, Spain
- Born: 23 September 1974 (age 52) Barcelona, Spain
- Height: 1.80 m (5 ft 11 in)
- Turned pro: 1993
- Retired: 7 April 2008
- Plays: Right-handed (one-handed backhand)
- Prize money: $5,311,964

Singles
- Career record: 313–218
- Career titles: 10
- Highest ranking: No. 10 (8 June 1998)

Grand Slam singles results
- Australian Open: QF (1997)
- French Open: SF (1998)
- Wimbledon: 3R (1998)
- US Open: 4R (1997)

Other tournaments
- Grand Slam Cup: QF (1998)

Doubles
- Career record: 10–22
- Career titles: 0
- Highest ranking: No. 208 (2 August 2004)

Félix Mantilla Botella (Spanish pronunciation: [ˈfeliɣs manˈtiʎa βoˈteʎa]; (Note: In isolation, Botella is pronounced [boˈteʎa].) Catalan: Fèlix Mantilla Botella, pronounced [ˈfɛliɡz mənˈtiʎə βuˈteʎə]; (Note: In isolation, Fèlix and Botella are pronounced [ˈfɛliks] and [buˈteʎə] respectively.) born 23 September 1974) is a Spanish tennis coach and a former professional player. In common with many of his fellow countrymen, Mantilla's best surface is clay. While not as successful away from the clay, Mantilla also produced good hardcourt results. Mantilla's best stroke was his single-handed backhand and he was known for his baseline consistency from both sides and high endurance levels. He reached the semi-finals of the 1998 French Open, won the 2003 Rome Masters, and achieved a career-high singles ranking of World No. 10.

== Tennis career ==
Mantilla began playing tennis at the age of ten and was a member of the winning Spanish Sunshine Cup team along with Albert Costa in 1992.

Mantilla turned professional in 1993 playing Futures and Challenger events. In 1994 Mantilla won the Uruguay/Paraguay Satellite classification and was second in the Spanish satellite 2 and 4 events. He also played his first match on the ATP Tour in Prague, losing to compatriot Àlex Corretja in 3 sets.

At the beginning of 1994 Mantilla was ranked 301st in the ATP Entry Rankings, but at the end of 1995 he had progressed to 84th and had a 10–5 record for the season. Mantilla made his first two finals that year losing in the Budapest Challenger to Jiří Novák in 3 sets and following his first semi final appearance at the ATP level losing to Sjeng Schalken, it was followed up with his first final on the ATP Buenos Aires losing to Carlos Moyá in straight sets.

Mantilla's ranking had jumped up 66 places at the end of 1996 where he finished the year ranked 18th. He compiled a 48–27 record for the year mostly on the clay, and in the process won three Challenger titles, each of them without losing a set. This feat was achieved in Punta del Este defeating Kris Goosens in the final. Mantilla followed the success with victories in Naples over Karim Alami and later in the year in Tashkent over Lars Rehmann.

On the ATP main tour, Mantilla qualified for his first TMS event in Monte-Carlo and defeated the two time Roland Garros champion Sergi Bruguera before losing in the quarter-finals to Albert Costa. In the week before the French Open, Mantilla reached his second final in St Pölten losing to Marcelo Ríos.

In his grand slam debut at the 1996 French Open, Mantilla defeated Dirk Dier and Àlex Corretja, eventually falling to the eventual champion Yevgeny Kafelnikov in straight sets. After this he went on to win his first ATP title in Porto over Hernán Gumy 6–7, 6–4, 6–3. Mantilla proceeded to make two more finals in Gstaad and Umag where he lost to Albert Costa on both occasions. In total for 1996 Mantilla won three Challenger titles and his first title in Porto and made three finals.

In 1997 Mantilla went a career best of 53–22 for the season. He achieved his best result at the 1997 Australian Open before falling to finalist Carlos Moyà in the quarter-finals. Mantilla made his first TMS final in Hamburg, losing easily to Andriy MedvedevHe then won all his four singles matches as Spain won the World Team Cup. After a disappointing second round exit to Magnus Larsson at Roland Garros, Mantilla went on a hot streak and won four titles in his next five tournaments at ATP level and in between made the final of the Braunschweig Challenger losing to Francisco Roig. Mantilla's run began at Bologna where defeated reigning French Open champion Gustavo Kuerten, then followed up with titles in Gstaad over Joan Albert Viloca, in Umag over Sergi Bruguera and in San Marino over Magnus Gustafsson. Mantilla won another title in Bournemouth over Carlos Moyà and finished the year ranked 16th. This year also had his best performance at the US Open reaching 4th round losing to Richard Krajicek, and in 3rd round won over John Van Lottum in 5 sets, playing last sets with big cramps that impeded normal movement. He closed the best year in his career with a victory on National Tennis Masters competition in Spain (national version of ATP World Tour Finals) defeating Francisco Clavet at the final in Zaragoza after losing the first set. After winning Clavet, Mantilla declared: "Next year I want to win more important tournaments, shine in the big occasions and be a better tennis player".

In 1998 Mantilla after losing a bet with Luis Lobo in Rome, in which he had to dye his hair blonde. Mantilla reached his highest ever ranking of number 10 on 8 June after reaching the semi-finals at Roland Garros. He beat Wolfgang Schranz, Byron Black, Fabrice Santoro and Ramón Delgado to reach the quarter-final. There he defeated Thomas Muster, gaining revenge for his loss in Rome against the same opponent who when Mantilla was eating a banana at the change of ends, had taken the banana out of his hands and started to eat it himself, at the end of the match Mantilla did not shake hands with Muster. He lost his semi final to Carlos Moyà. He defended his title in Bournemouth in clay, defeating Albert Costa. He also improves his achievements in hard courts and reached two finals: Dubai, losing to Àlex Corretja and Long Island losing to Patrick Rafter. He also reached the semifinals in Auckland.

Mantilla won his only title for 1999 in Barcelona over Karim Alami, destroying his rivals at the first three rounds and defeating excellent clay players from quarterfinals: Carlos Moya, Francisco Clavet and Karim Alami. He defeated world number 1 Pete Sampras at Indian Wells on hardcourt and managed to repeat the feat defeating the then number 1 Lleyton Hewitt in 2002 on hardcourt as well. Apart from his title he reached the semis of the TMS events in Monte Carlo and Rome losing to Gustavo Kuerten and to Pat Rafter respectively. Mantilla said that "Rafter's backhand was so slow it was like his mother hitting the ball".

Mantilla played his only Davis Cup match for Spain in a promotion and relegation tie against New Zealand in New Zealand for the 2000 Davis Cup. The big stars at the time Àlex Corretja, Albert Costa did not want to travel to Hamilton for the tie. Mantilla defeated Mark Nielsen in 5 sets (last sets with back injury and much pain) on a fast indoor hardcourt to help Spain gain promotion to the World Group along with Julián Alonso, Francisco Clavet and Joan Balcells.

Mantilla experienced the first of his shoulder problems and underwent surgery in 2000 and was sidelined for six months and did not return to tennis until January 2001. He won two consecutive Challengers in Espinho over Tommy Robredo and Barletta defeating Markus Hipfl, this was followed up with a final in Estoril losing to nemesis Juan Carlos Ferrero as he did in all 8 of their matches. Later in the year he won Palermo defeating David Nalbandian after saving nine match points for the second time in his career in his semi final victory over Albert Portas, the first time was against Alberto Berasategui in the 1998 TMS Hamburg. Mantilla made two finals in 2002 in Doha and Indianapolis on hardcourt losing to Younes El Aynaoui and Greg Rusedski respectively.

At the 2003 Australian Open Mantilla played 4 consecutive 5 set matches, winning the first three and then after leading two sets to love he lost the fourth one to Sébastien Grosjean. In May Mantilla won the Internazionali d'Italia at the Foro Italico in Rome, his last and biggest career title to date, defeating the favourite Roger Federer 7–5, 6–2, 7–6 and becoming the first unseeded player to win the event. Mantilla said about his game "I don't have the serve of Sampras or the volley of Rafter or the talent of Agassi, you know. I must be very focus every point. I must be strong mentally."

After 2003 Mantilla's career went into decline, with the onset of injuries to his Achilles tendon and to his shoulder and the game moving at a speed that Mantilla's game could not keep up with. In 2004 he was involved in two more memorable matches in his defense of his TMS Rome title, Mantilla was down 7–5, 5–0 against Robby Ginepri and came back to win the next 13 games to win the match 5–7, 7–5, 6–0 and in the process he saved 5 match points. The other was a 5 set thriller at the French Open against Marat Safin which he lost 6–4, 2–6, 6–2, 6–7, 11–9, which he served for the match 3 times and was unsuccessful.

Mantilla's last match of 2005 was against Guillermo Coria at the 2005 US Open and he did not play tennis due to shoulder problems until 2007. In 2006 it was discovered that Mantilla had skin cancer from which he has recovered.

Mantilla returned to tennis in the 2007 Monza Challenger and qualified for the main draw winning his 3 qualification matches. In April 2007, Mantilla played his first ATP match since 2005 in Barcelona at the age of 32, where he lost in the second round to Carlos Moyá.

In 2008 Mantilla was working part-time with Wayne Odesnik and he was appointed by Tennis Australia as a coach to help Australian youngsters with their clay court game, he moved between Australia and Barcelona

He was the trainer of Aleksandr Dolgopolov and nowadays trains Toni Navarro.

== Personal life ==
Both of Mantilla's parents are schoolteachers.

He is a fan of the football team FC Barcelona and his hobbies include reading. He owns a large collection of Spanish movies and his favourite actors are Gabino Diego, Coque Malla and Juanjo Puigcorbé. His favourite cities include Paris and Rome. During his championship win at the Rome Masters, Mantilla said of the latter, "When I come to Rome I always feel like a gladiator in the Colosseum. [...] The people enjoy watching me. I'm just running and fighting all the time."

After winning the Rome Masters, Mantilla paid tribute to his longtime coach Jordi Vilaro.

"I don't have the serve of Sampras or the volley of Rafter or the talent of Agassi," Mantilla once said, describing his game, "[but] I am strong physically, I am strong mentally. And when I am like that, I'm dangerous."

== Masters Series finals ==
=== Singles: 2 (1–1) ===
Result	Date	Tournament	Surface	Opponent	Score
Loss	May 1997	Hamburg, Germany	Clay	(Ukraine) Andrei Medvedev	0–6, 4–6, 2–6
Win	May 2003	Rome, Italy	Clay	(Switzerland) Roger Federer	7–5, 6–2, 7–6^{(10–8)}

== Career finals ==
=== Singles: 21 (10 wins, 11 losses) ===
Legend (singles)
Grand Slam (0–0)
Tennis Masters Cup (0–0)
ATP Masters Series (1–1)
ATP Championship Series (1–1)
ATP Tour (8–9)

Result	W/L	Date	Tournament	Surface	Opponent	Score
Loss	0–1	Nov 1995	Buenos Aires, Argentina	Clay	(Spain) Carlos Moyá	0–6, 3–6
Loss	0–2	May 1996	St. Pölten, Austria	Clay	(Chile) Marcelo Ríos	2–6, 4–6
Win	1–2	Jun 1996	Porto, Portugal	Clay	(Argentina) Hernán Gumy	6–7^{(5–7)}, 6–4, 6–3
Loss	1–3	Jul 1996	Gstaad, Switzerland	Clay	(Spain) Albert Costa	6–4, 6–7^{(2–7)}, 1–6, 0–6
Loss	1–4	Aug 1996	San Marino, San Marino	Clay	(Spain) Albert Costa	6–7^{(7–9)}, 3–6
Loss	1–5	Aug 1996	Umag, Croatia	Clay	(Spain) Carlos Moyá	0–6, 6–7^{(4–7)}
Loss	1–6	May 1997	Hamburg, Germany	Clay	(Ukraine) Andrei Medvedev	0–6, 4–6, 2–6
Win	2–6	Jun 1997	Bologna, Italy	Clay	(Brazil) Gustavo Kuerten	4–6, 6–2, 6–1
Win	3–6	Jul 1997	Gstaad, Switzerland	Clay	(Spain) Juan Albert Viloca	6–1, 6–4, 6–4
Win	4–6	Jul 1997	Umag, Croatia	Clay	(Spain) Sergi Bruguera	6–3, 7–5
Win	5–6	Aug 1997	San Marino, San Marino	Clay	(Sweden) Magnus Gustafsson	6–4, 6–1
Win	6–6	Sep 1997	Bournemouth, UK	Clay	(Spain) Carlos Moyà	6–2, 6–2
Loss	6–7	Feb 1998	Dubai, UAE	Hard	(Spain) Àlex Corretja	6–7^{(0–7)}, 1–6
Loss	6–8	Aug 1998	Long Island, U.S.	Hard	(Australia) Patrick Rafter	6–7^{(3–7)}, 2–6
Win	7–8	Sep 1998	Bournemouth, UK	Clay	(Spain) Albert Costa	6–3, 7–5
Win	8–8	Apr 1999	Barcelona, Spain	Clay	(Morocco) Karim Alami	7–6^{(7–2)}, 6–3, 6–3
Loss	8–9	Apr 2001	Estoril, Portugal	Clay	(Spain) Juan Carlos Ferrero	6–7^{(3–7)}, 6–4, 3–6
Win	9–9	Sep 2001	Palermo, Italy	Clay	(Argentina) David Nalbandian	7–6^{(7–2)}, 6–4
Loss	9–10	Jan 2002	Doha, Qatar	Hard	(Morocco) Younes El Aynaoui	6–4, 2–6, 2–6
Loss	9–11	Aug 2002	Indianapolis, U.S.	Hard	(United Kingdom) Greg Rusedski	7–6^{(8–6)}, 4–6, 4–6
Win	10–11	May 2003	Rome, Italy	Clay	(Switzerland) Roger Federer	7–5, 6–2, 7–6^{(10–8)}

== Singles performance timeline ==
Key
W	F	SF	QF	#R	RR	Q#	P#	DNQ	A	Z#	PO	G	S	B	NMS	NTI	P	NH

(W) winner; (F) finalist; (SF) semifinalist; (QF) quarterfinalist; (#R) rounds 4, 3, 2, 1; (RR) round-robin stage; (Q#) qualification round; (P#) preliminary round; (DNQ) did not qualify; (A) absent; (Z#) Davis/Fed Cup Zonal Group (with number indication) or (PO) play-off; (G) gold, (S) silver or (B) bronze Olympic/Paralympic medal; (NMS) not a Masters tournament; (NTI) not a Tier I tournament; (P) postponed; (NH) not held; (SR) strike rate (events won / competed); (W–L) win–loss record.

Tournament	1995	1996	1997	1998	1999	2000	2001	2002	2003	2004	2005	SR	W–L
Grand Slam tournaments
Australian Open	A	A	QF	1R	1R	1R	1R	1R	4R	1R	1R	0 / 9	7–9
French Open	A	3R	2R	SF	4R	1R	1R	A	4R	2R	3R	0 / 9	17–9
Wimbledon	A	1R	A	3R	2R	1R	2R	A	1R	2R	1R	0 / 8	5–8
US Open	A	2R	4R	2R	1R	A	2R	1R	1R	A	1R	0 / 8	6–8
Win–loss	0–0	3–3	8–3	8–4	4–4	0–3	2–4	0–2	6–4	2–3	2–4	0 / 34	35–34
Year-end championships
Grand Slam Cup	WNI		1R	QF	WNI	Not held						0 / 2	1–2
ATP Masters Series
Indian Wells	A	A	1R	1R	3R	1R	A	1R	1R	1R	A	0 / 7	2–7
Miami	A	A	2R	2R	3R	3R	A	3R	2R	A	A	0 / 6	4–6
Monte-Carlo	Q1	QF	2R	1R	SF	2R	A	2R	2R	2R	2R	0 / 9	13–9
Hamburg	Q3	A	F	SF	2R	2R	Q2	2R	2R	A	Q1	0 / 6	12–6
Rome	Q2	A	1R	2R	SF	QF	3R	2R	W	2R	A	1 / 8	18–7
Canada	A	A	A	A	A	A	A	2R	A	A	A	0 / 1	1–1
Cincinnati	A	A	A	1R	A	A	1R	1R	1R	A	A	0 / 4	0–4
Madrid^{1}	A	3R	2R	A	A	A	Q1	1R	3R	A	A	0 / 4	2–4
Paris	A	3R	2R	A	1R	A	Q1	1R	2R	A	A	0 / 5	1–5
Win–loss	0–0	5–3	6–7	5–6	11–6	6–5	2–2	5–9	10–7	2–3	1–1	1 / 50	53–49
Career statistics
Titles	0	1	5	1	1	0	1	0	1	0	0	10	
Finals	1	5	6	3	1	0	2	2	1	0	0	21	
Year-end ranking	92	18	16	20	22	99	45	55	22	102	117		

^{1}This event was held in Stuttgart from 1996 through 2001.

== Top 10 wins ==
Season	1994	1995	1996	1997	1998	1999	2000	2001	2002	2003	2004	2005	2006	2007	Total
Wins	0	0	1	3	0	2	2	0	1	5	0	0	0	0	14

#	Player	Rank	Event	Surface	Rd	Score	MR
1996
1.	(Sweden) Thomas Enqvist	7	Prague, Czech Republic	Clay	1R	7–6^{(7–5)}, 6–1	63
1997
2.	(Spain) Carlos Moyà	10	Umag, Croatia	Clay	SF	7–6^{(7–5)}, 5–7, 6–3	14
3.	(Spain) Sergi Bruguera	7	Umag, Croatia	Clay	F	6–3, 7–5	14
4.	(Spain) Carlos Moyà	5	Bournemouth, United Kingdom	Clay	F	6–2, 6–2	14
1999
5.	(United States) Pete Sampras	1	Indian Wells, United States	Hard	2R	7–6^{(8–6)}, 3–6, 6–3	20
6.	(Spain) Carlos Moyà	2	Barcelona, Spain	Clay	QF	4–6, 6–2, 6–3	19
2000
7.	(Chile) Marcelo Ríos	8	Monte Carlo, Monaco	Clay	1R	6–4, 0–6, 6–2	47
8.	(Russia) Yevgeny Kafelnikov	4	World Team Cup, Düsseldorf, Germany	Clay	RR	6–3, 6–3	62
2002
9.	(Australia) Lleyton Hewitt	1	Toronto, Canada	Hard	1R	2–6, 6–4, 6–3	55
2003
10.	(Czech Republic) Jiří Novák	7	Auckland, New Zealand	Hard	QF	6–7^{(5–7)}, 6–2, 7–6^{(7–3)}	77
11.	(Spain) Albert Costa	8	Australian Open, Melbourne, Australia	Hard	3R	3–6, 6–3, 4–6, 6–1, 6–3	73
12.	(Spain) Carlos Moyà	4	Acapulco, Mexico	Clay	QF	6–4, 7–6^{(7–4)}	47
13.	(Spain) Albert Costa	8	Rome, Italy	Clay	3R	7–5, 4–6, 6–1	47
14.	(Switzerland) Roger Federer	5	Rome, Italy	Clay	F	7–5, 6–2, 7–6^{(10–8)}	47
