= 1991 Torneo Godó – Doubles =

Doubles
- 1991 Torneo Godó

Final
- Champions: (Argentina) Horacio de la Peña (Italy) Diego Nargiso
- Runners-up: (Germany) Boris Becker (Germany) Eric Jelen
- Score: 3–6, 7–6, 6–4

Details
- Draw: 28
- Seeds: 8

Events
Singles	Doubles
← 1990 ·	Barcelona Open	· 1992 →

Andrés Gómez and Javier Sánchez were the defending champions, but Sánchez did not compete this year. Gómez teamed up with Sergi Bruguera and lost in the semifinals to Boris Becker and Eric Jelen.

Horacio de la Peña and Diego Nargiso won the title by defeating Becker and Jelen 3–6, 7–6, 6–4 in the final.

== Seeds ==
The first four seeds received a bye to the second round.

1. (Spain) Sergio Casal / (Spain) Emilio Sánchez (second round)
2. (Italy) Omar Camporese / (Spain) Javier Sánchez (quarterfinals)
3. (Socialist Federal Republic of Yugoslavia) Goran Ivanišević / (Australia) Mark Woodforde (quarterfinals)
4. (Netherlands) Paul Haarhuis / (Netherlands) Mark Koevermans (second round)
5. (Australia) Broderick Dyke / (Australia) Laurie Warder (first round)
6. (Czechoslovakia) Karel Nováček / (Czechoslovakia) Tomáš Šmíd (first round)
7. (United States) Jeff Brown / (Argentina) Gustavo Luza (first round)
8. (Spain) Sergi Bruguera / (Ecuador) Andrés Gómez (semifinals)

== Draw ==
=== Key ===
- Q = Qualifier
- WC = Wild card
- LL = Lucky loser
- Alt = Alternate
- ITF = ITF entry
- PR = Protected ranking
- SR = Special ranking
- SE = Special exempt
- JE = Junior exempt
- JR = Junior Accelerator Programme entrant
- CO = College Accelerator Programme entrant
- NG = Next Gen Accelerator Program entrant
- w/o = Walkover
- r = Retired
- d = Defaulted

=== Finals ===
Semifinals
Q	(Spain) José Luis Aparisi (Spain) Vicente Solves	2	4
(Argentina) Horacio de la Peña (Italy) Diego Nargiso	6	6
(Germany) Boris Becker (Germany) Eric Jelen	7	6
8	(Spain) Sergi Bruguera (Ecuador) Andrés Gómez	6	2

Final
(Argentina) Horacio de la Peña (Italy) Diego Nargiso	3	7	6
(Germany) Boris Becker (Germany) Eric Jelen	6	6	4

=== Top half ===
First round
(Sweden) R Båthman (Sweden) R Bergh	1	6	6
WC	(Argentina) G Pérez Roldán (Austria) H Skoff	6	2	2
WC	(Spain) JF Altur (Spain) G López	4	6	4
(United States) B Garnett (United States) G Van Emburgh	6	3	6
Q	(Spain) JL Aparisi (Spain) V Solves	6	2	6
7	(United States) J Brown (Argentina) G Luza	3	6	1
(Netherlands) HJ Davids (Sweden) P Henricsson	6	6
(Spain) F Clavet (Brazil) C Motta	3	4
(Spain) JC Báguena (Spain) T Carbonell	6	3	6
WC	(Argentina) M Jaite (Uruguay) D Pérez	2	6	4
(Argentina) H de la Peña (Italy) D Nargiso	6	6
6	(Czechoslovakia) K Nováček (Czechoslovakia) T Šmíd	4	3

Second round
1	(Spain) S Casal (Spain) E Sánchez	7	1	6
(Sweden) R Båthman (Sweden) R Bergh	5	6	7
(United States) B Garnett (United States) G Van Emburgh	1	6	4
Q	(Spain) JL Aparisi (Spain) V Solves	6	2	6
4	(Netherlands) P Haarhuis (Netherlands) M Koevermans	6	4	5
(Netherlands) HJ Davids (Sweden) P Henricsson	4	6	7
(Spain) JC Báguena (Spain) T Carbonell	4	6
(Argentina) H de la Peña (Italy) D Nargiso	6	7

Quarterfinals
(Sweden) R Båthman (Sweden) R Bergh	2	r
Q	(Spain) JL Aparisi (Spain) V Solves	5
(Netherlands) HJ Davids (Sweden) P Henricsson	6	7	3
(Argentina) H de la Peña (Italy) D Nargiso	7	5	6

Semifinals
Q	(Spain) JL Aparisi (Spain) V Solves	2	4
(Argentina) H de la Peña (Italy) D Nargiso	6	6

=== Bottom half ===
First round
5	(Australia) B Dyke (Australia) L Warder	4	4
(Spain) C Costa (Spain) F Roig	6	6
(Czechoslovakia) V Flégl (Socialist Federal Republic of Yugoslavia) G Prpić	4	6	2
(Germany) B Becker (Germany) E Jelen	6	0	6
(Netherlands) T Nijssen (Czechoslovakia) C Suk	6	5	6
(Czechoslovakia) J Čihák (Czechoslovakia) L Pimek	3	7	1
8	(Spain) S Bruguera (Ecuador) A Gómez	1	6	6
(Iran) M Bahrami (France) R Gilbert	6	3	3
(United States) C Beckman (United States) S Cannon	4	6	1
Q	(Czechoslovakia) B Stankovič (Czechoslovakia) R Vogel	6	2	6
(Italy) C Brandi (Italy) F Mordegan	6	6
(The Bahamas) R Smith (Sweden) T Svantesson	4	1

Second round
(Spain) C Costa (Spain) F Roig	6	3	6
(Germany) B Becker (Germany) E Jelen	2	6	7
(Netherlands) T Nijssen (Czechoslovakia) C Suk	3	2
3	(Socialist Federal Republic of Yugoslavia) G Ivanišević (Australia) M Woodforde	6	6
8	(Spain) S Bruguera (Ecuador) A Gómez	7	6
Q	(Czechoslovakia) B Stankovič (Czechoslovakia) R Vogel	5	2
(Italy) C Brandi (Italy) F Mordegan	3	4
2	(Italy) O Camporese (Spain) J Sánchez	6	6

Quarterfinals
(Germany) B Becker (Germany) E Jelen	6	4	6
3	(Socialist Federal Republic of Yugoslavia) G Ivanišević (Australia) M Woodforde	4	6	4
8	(Spain) S Bruguera (Ecuador) A Gómez	6	7
2	(Italy) O Camporese (Spain) J Sánchez	1	5

Semifinals
(Germany) B Becker (Germany) E Jelen	7	6
8	(Spain) S Bruguera (Ecuador) A Gómez	6	2
