= 1991 Yugoslav Open – Doubles =

Doubles
- 1991 Yugoslav Open
- 1990 Champions: (Czech Republic) Vojtěch Flégl (Czech Republic) Daniel Vacek

Final
- Champions: (Israel) Gilad Bloom (Spain) Javier Sánchez
- Runners-up: (United States) Richey Reneberg (United States) David Wheaton
- Score: 7–6, 2–6, 6–1

Details
- Draw: 16 (1WC/1Q)
- Seeds: 4

Events
Singles	Doubles
← 1990 ·	Croatia Open	· 1992 →

Vojtěch Flégl and Daniel Vacek were the defending champions, but Flégl chose to compete at Rome during the same week. Vacek teamed up with Tobias Svantesson and lost in the first round to José Luis Aparisi and Vicente Solves.

Gilad Bloom and Javier Sánchez won the title by defeating Richey Reneberg and David Wheaton 7–6, 2–6, 6–1 in the final.

== Seeds ==
1. (United States) Richey Reneberg / (United States) David Wheaton (final)
2. (Sweden) Tobias Svantesson / (Czechoslovakia) Daniel Vacek (first round)
3. (Israel) Gilad Bloom / (Spain) Javier Sánchez (champions)
4. (Spain) Marcos Górriz / (Russia) Andrei Olhovskiy (semifinals)

== Draw ==
=== Key ===
- Q = Qualifier
- WC = Wild card
- LL = Lucky loser
- Alt = Alternate
- ITF = ITF entry
- PR = Protected ranking
- SR = Special ranking
- SE = Special exempt
- JE = Junior exempt
- JR = Junior Accelerator Programme entrant
- CO = College Accelerator Programme entrant
- NG = Next Gen Accelerator Program entrant
- w/o = Walkover
- r = Retired
- d = Defaulted

=== Draw ===
First round
1	(United States) R Reneberg (United States) D Wheaton	6	6
(Netherlands) J Eltingh (Netherlands) M Oosting	4	4
(United States) B Garnett (United States) G Van Emburgh	6	5	7
(Spain) F Clavet (Spain) J Clavet	3	7	6
4	(Spain) M Górriz (Russia) A Olhovskiy	4	6	6
WC	(Socialist Federal Republic of Yugoslavia) S Hiršzon (Socialist Federal Republic of Yugoslavia) B Orešar	6	1	4
(Argentina) P Albano (Czechoslovakia) J Čihák	5	1
(Sweden) J Gunnarsson (Denmark) M Mortensen	7	6
(United States) S Patridge (United States) K Thorne	6	3	6
(Romania) MI Năstase (Kenya) P Wekesa	2	6	3
Q	(Portugal) J Cunha e Silva (Argentina) M Ingaramo	2	4
3	(Israel) G Bloom (Spain) J Sánchez	6	6
(Venezuela) A Mora (Brazil) J Oncins	3	6	6
(Czechoslovakia) M Damm (Czechoslovakia) R Vogel	6	4	7
(Spain) JL Aparisi (Spain) V Solves	6	6
2	(Sweden) T Svantesson (Czechoslovakia) D Vacek	4	4

Quarterfinals
1	(United States) R Reneberg (United States) D Wheaton	6	6
(United States) B Garnett (United States) G Van Emburgh	4	4
4	(Spain) M Górriz (Russia) A Olhovskiy	4	6	6
(Sweden) J Gunnarsson (Denmark) M Mortensen	6	1	4
(United States) S Patridge (United States) K Thorne	5	7	5
3	(Israel) G Bloom (Spain) J Sánchez	7	5	7
(Czechoslovakia) M Damm (Czechoslovakia) R Vogel	6	6
(Spain) JL Aparisi (Spain) V Solves	1	4

Semifinals
1	(United States) R Reneberg (United States) D Wheaton	6	6
4	(Spain) M Górriz (Russia) A Olhovskiy	3	1
3	(Israel) G Bloom (Spain) J Sánchez	6	7	7
(Czechoslovakia) M Damm (Czechoslovakia) R Vogel	7	5	5

Final
1	(United States) R Reneberg (United States) D Wheaton	6	6	1
3	(Israel) G Bloom (Spain) J Sánchez	7	2	6
