= 1991 Torneo Godó – Singles =

Singles
- 1991 Torneo Godó

Final
- Champion: (Spain) Emilio Sánchez
- Runner-up: (Spain) Sergi Bruguera
- Score: 6–4, 7–6^{(9–7)}, 6–2

Details
- Draw: 56 (2WC/7Q)
- Seeds: 16

Events
| Singles | Doubles |
| ← 1990 · | Barcelona Open | · 1992 → |

Andrés Gómez was the defending champion, but lost in the second round to Marcelo Filippini.

Emilio Sánchez won the title by defeating Sergi Bruguera 6–4, 7–6^{(9–7)}, 6–2 in the final.

== Seeds ==
The first eight seeds received a bye to the second round.

1. (Germany) Boris Becker (third round)
2. (France) Guy Forget (second round)
3. (United States) Andre Agassi (quarterfinals)
4. (Socialist Federal Republic of Yugoslavia) Goran Ivanišević (second round)
5. (Sweden) Jonas Svensson (second round)
6. (Ecuador) Andrés Gómez (second round)
7. (Spain) Emilio Sánchez (champion)
8. (Soviet Union) Andrei Chesnokov (quarterfinals)
9. (Soviet Union) Andrei Cherkasov (third round)
10. (Switzerland) Marc Rosset (second round, retired)
11. (Argentina) Guillermo Pérez Roldán (semifinals)
12. (Spain) Juan Aguilera (first round)
13. (Soviet Union) Alexander Volkov (second round)
14. (Czechoslovakia) Karel Nováček (second round)
15. (Spain) Sergi Bruguera (final)
16. (Italy) Omar Camporese (quarterfinals)

== Draw ==
=== Key ===
- Q = Qualifier
- WC = Wild card
- LL = Lucky loser
- Alt = Alternate
- ITF = ITF entry
- PR = Protected ranking
- SR = Special ranking
- SE = Special exempt
- JE = Junior exempt
- JR = Junior Accelerator Programme entrant
- CO = College Accelerator Programme entrant
- NG = Next Gen Accelerator Program entrant
- w/o = Walkover
- r = Retired
- d = Defaulted

=== Finals ===
Quarterfinals
15 | (Spain) Sergi Bruguera | 6 | 7
8 | (Soviet Union) Andrei Chesnokov | 2 | 5
3 | (United States) Andre Agassi | 0 | 7^{7} | 6^{3}
11 | (Argentina) Guillermo Pérez Roldán | 6 | 6^{4} | 7^{7}
(Argentina) Martín Jaite | 6 | 4 | 6
(Finland) Veli Paloheimo | 1 | 6 | 3
7 | (Spain) Emilio Sánchez | 7^{7} | 4 | 7
16 | (Italy) Omar Camporese | 6^{4} | 6 | 5

Semifinals
15 | (Spain) Sergi Bruguera | 6 | 6
11 | (Argentina) Guillermo Pérez Roldán | 4 | 4
(Argentina) Martín Jaite | 5 | 2
7 | (Spain) Emilio Sánchez | 7 | 6

Final
15 | (Spain) Sergi Bruguera | 4 | 6^{7} | 2
7 | (Spain) Emilio Sánchez | 6 | 7^{9} | 6

=== Top half ===
==== Section 1 ====
First round
(France) JP Fleurian | 4 | 7^{7} | 7
(Argentina) F Davín | 6 | 6^{2} | 5
(Germany) E Jelen | 6^{2} | 2
(Germany) CU Steeb | 7^{7} | 6
(Australia) M Woodforde | 0 | 0
15 | (Spain) S Bruguera | 6 | 6
10 | (Switzerland) M Rosset | 6^{6} | 6 | 6
Q | (Switzerland) C Mezzadri | 7^{8} | 1 | 4
(Spain) JF Altur | 2 | 5
(Spain) J Sánchez | 6 | 7
(Argentina) R Azar | 7^{7} | 3 | 6
Q | (Spain) JL Aparisi | 6^{3} | 6 | 4

Second round
1 | (Germany) B Becker | 7 | 6
(France) JP Fleurian | 5 | 1
(Germany) CU Steeb | 4 | 1
15 | (Spain) S Bruguera | 6 | 6
10 | (Switzerland) M Rosset | 6 | 3 | 4^{r}
(Spain) J Sánchez | 3 | 6 | 3
(Argentina) R Azar | 5 | 2
8 | (Soviet Union) A Chesnokov | 7 | 6

Third round
1 | (Germany) B Becker | 2 | 4
15 | (Spain) S Bruguera | 6 | 6
(Spain) J Sánchez | 7 | 5 | 4
8 | (Soviet Union) A Chesnokov | 5 | 7 | 6

Quarterfinals
15 | (Spain) S Bruguera | 6 | 7
8 | (Soviet Union) A Chesnokov | 2 | 5

==== Section 2 ====
First round
(Spain) T Carbonell | 3 | 1
(Socialist Federal Republic of Yugoslavia) G Prpić | 6 | 6
(Finland) A Rahunen | 6 | 6
(Portugal) J Cunha e Silva | 4 | 4
Q | (Spain) C Costa | 3 | 6 | 4
14 | (Czechoslovakia) K Nováček | 6 | 1 | 6
11 | (Argentina) G Pérez Roldán | 6 | 6
(Sweden) L Jönsson | 3 | 4
(Italy) D Nargiso | 3 | 7^{7} | 3
Q | (Spain) G López | 6 | 6^{5} | 6
(Austria) H Skoff | 6^{8} | 3
(Uruguay) M Filippini | 7^{10} | 6

Second round
3 | (United States) A Agassi | 6^{9} | 6 | 7
(Socialist Federal Republic of Yugoslavia) G Prpić | 7^{11} | 4 | 5
(Finland) A Rahunen | 0 | 6 | 6
14 | (Czechoslovakia) K Nováček | 6 | 2 | 2
11 | (Argentina) G Pérez Roldán | 7 | 1 | 6
Q | (Spain) G López | 5 | 6 | 4
(Uruguay) M Filippini | 5 | 6 | 6
6 | (Ecuador) A Gómez | 7 | 4 | 4

Third round
3 | (United States) A Agassi | 6 | 6
(Finland) A Rahunen | 2 | 3
11 | (Argentina) G Pérez Roldán | 6 | 6
(Uruguay) M Filippini | 1 | 0

Quarterfinals
3 | (United States) A Agassi | 0 | 7^{7} | 6^{3}
11 | (Argentina) G Pérez Roldán | 6 | 6^{4} | 7^{7}

=== Bottom half ===
==== Section 3 ====
First round
(Argentina) M Jaite | 6 | 6
(Netherlands) P Haarhuis | 3 | 4
(France) H Leconte | 1 | 2
(Italy) R Furlan | 6 | 6
(Sweden) M Gustafsson | 6 | 6
12 | (Spain) J Aguilera | 4 | 0
13 | (Soviet Union) A Volkov | 7^{8} | 6^{3} | 6
(Spain) F Luna | 6^{6} | 7^{7} | 4
(Sweden) M Wilander | 3 | 2
(Spain) F Clavet | 6 | 6
(Finland) V Paloheimo | 6 | 2 | 6
Q | (Argentina) A Mancini | 4 | 6 | 4

Second round
5/WC | (Sweden) J Svensson | 5 | 6 | 2
(Argentina) M Jaite | 7 | 4 | 6
(Italy) R Furlan | 3 | 1
(Sweden) M Gustafsson | 6 | 6
13 | (Soviet Union) A Volkov | 0 | 1
(Spain) F Clavet | 6 | 6
(Finland) V Paloheimo | 6 | 6
4 | (Socialist Federal Republic of Yugoslavia) G Ivanišević | 3 | 4

Third round
(Argentina) M Jaite | 6 | 0 | 7
(Sweden) M Gustafsson | 3 | 6 | 5
(Spain) F Clavet | 3 | 4
(Finland) V Paloheimo | 6 | 6

Quarterfinals
(Argentina) M Jaite | 6 | 4 | 6
(Finland) V Paloheimo | 1 | 6 | 3

==== Section 4 ====
First round
Q | (Uruguay) D Pérez | 7^{7} | 6
(Netherlands) M Koevermans | 6^{4} | 1
(Spain) F Roig | 3 | 6 | 7
Q | (Spain) V Solves | 6 | 2 | 5
(France) T Benhabiles | 6 | 2 | 1
9 | (Soviet Union) A Cherkasov | 2 | 6 | 6
16 | (Italy) O Camporese | 6 | 3 | 6
(France) T Champion | 1 | 6 | 1
(Australia) R Fromberg | 4 | 4
(Argentina) H de la Peña | 6 | 6
(Spain) J Arrese | 6^{0} | 7 | 6
(Czechoslovakia) M Vajda | 7^{7} | 5 | 4

Second round
7 | (Spain) E Sánchez | 4 | 6 | 6
Q | (Uruguay) D Pérez | 6 | 1 | 1
(Spain) F Roig | 2 | 5
9 | (Soviet Union) A Cherkasov | 6 | 7
16 | (Italy) O Camporese | 3 | 6 | 6
(Argentina) H de la Peña | 6 | 1 | 2
(Spain) J Arrese | 2 | 6 | 7
2/WC | (France) G Forget | 6 | 3 | 5

Third round
7 | (Spain) E Sánchez | 5 | 7 | 6
9 | (Soviet Union) A Cherkasov | 7 | 5 | 3
16 | (Italy) O Camporese | 6 | 7
(Spain) J Arrese | 3 | 5

Quarterfinals
7 | (Spain) E Sánchez | 7^{7} | 4 | 7
16 | (Italy) O Camporese | 6^{4} | 6 | 5
