= 1990 Yugoslav Open – Doubles =

Doubles
- 1990 Yugoslav Open

Final
- Champions: (Czechoslovakia) Vojtěch Flégl (Czechoslovakia) Daniel Vacek
- Runners-up: (Soviet Union) Andrei Cherkasov (Soviet Union) Andrei Olhovskiy
- Score: 6–4, 6–4

Details
- Draw: 16
- Seeds: 4

Events
| Singles | Doubles |
- Croatia Open

The first edition of the ATP tournament in Umag was held from 14 May until 20 May 1990.

Vojtěch Flégl and Daniel Vacek won the title by defeating Andrei Cherkasov and Andrei Olhovskiy 6–4, 6–4 in the final.

== Seeds ==
1. (Hungary) Balázs Taróczy / (Czechoslovakia) Marián Vajda (first round)
2. (Venezuela) Alfonso Mora / (United States) Brian Page (first round)
3. (Belgium) Eduardo Masso / (Uruguay) Diego Pérez (semifinals)
4. (Israel) Gilad Bloom / (Venezuela) Nicolás Pereira (first round)

== Draw ==
Key

- Q = Qualifier
- WC = Wild card
- LL = Lucky loser
- Alt = Alternate
- ITF = ITF entry
- PR = Protected ranking
- SR = Special ranking
- SE = Special exempt
- JE = Junior exempt
- JR = Junior Accelerator Programme entrant
- CO = College Accelerator Programme entrant
- NG = Next Gen Accelerator Program entrant
- w/o = Walkover
- r = Retired
- d = Defaulted

=== Draw ===
First round
1 | (Hungary) B Taróczy (Czechoslovakia) M Vajda | 4 | 3
(Soviet Union) A Cherkasov (Soviet Union) A Olhovskiy | 6 | 6
(Socialist Federal Republic of Yugoslavia) G Ivanišević (Socialist Federal Republic of Yugoslavia) G Prpić | 6 | 7
(Sweden) T Nydahl (Spain) V Solves | 2 | 6
3 | (Belgium) E Masso (Uruguay) D Pérez | 5 | 6 | 7
(Spain) J Clavet (Spain) MA Górriz | 7 | 4 | 5
(France) T Benhabiles (France) T Tulasne | 1 | 2
(Brazil) R Camargo (Brazil) O Della | 6 | 6
(Czechoslovakia) V Flégl (Czechoslovakia) D Vacek | 6 | 6
(Socialist Federal Republic of Yugoslavia) D Buljević (Socialist Federal Republic of Yugoslavia) E Rasberger | 2 | 3
(Argentina) H de la Pena (Spain) B Uribe | 7 | 6
4 | (Israel) G Bloom (Venezuela) N Pereira | 5 | 2
(Belgium) L Pimek (Spain) F Roig | 6 | 7
(Cuba) J Pino (Cuba) M Tabares | 1 | 5
(Argentina) E Bengoechea (Argentina) M Ingaramo | 1 | 6 | 6
2 | (Venezuela) A Mora (United States) B Page | 6 | 0 | 2

Quarterfinals
(Soviet Union) A Cherkasov (Soviet Union) A Olhovskiy | 7 | 7
(Socialist Federal Republic of Yugoslavia) G Ivanišević (Socialist Federal Republic of Yugoslavia) G Prpić | 5 | 5
3 | (Belgium) E Masso (Uruguay) D Pérez | 4 | 6 | 6
(Brazil) R Camargo (Brazil) O Della | 6 | 2 | 3
(Czechoslovakia) V Flégl (Czechoslovakia) D Vacek | 6 | 6
(Argentina) H de la Pena (Spain) B Uribe | 4 | 4
(Belgium) L Pimek (Spain) F Roig | 4 | 6 | 6
(Argentina) E Bengoechea (Argentina) M Ingaramo | 6 | 3 | 3

Semifinals
(Soviet Union) A Cherkasov (Soviet Union) A Olhovskiy | w/o
3 | (Belgium) E Masso (Uruguay) D Pérez
(Czechoslovakia) V Flégl (Czechoslovakia) D Vacek | 4 | 7 | 7
(Belgium) L Pimek (Spain) F Roig | 6 | 6 | 5

Final
(Soviet Union) A Cherkasov (Soviet Union) A Olhovskiy | 4 | 4
(Czechoslovakia) V Flégl (Czechoslovakia) D Vacek | 6 | 6
