= 1992 Croatia Open – Doubles =

Doubles
- 1992 Croatia Open
- 1991 Champions: (Israel) Gilad Bloom (Spain) Javier Sánchez

Final
- Champions: (Germany) David Prinosil (Czechoslovakia) Richard Vogel
- Runners-up: (Netherlands) Sander Groen (Germany) Lars Koslowski
- Score: 6–3, 6–7, 7–6

Details
- Draw: 16
- Seeds: 4

Events
Singles	Doubles
← 1991 ·	Croatia Open	· 1993 →

Gilad Bloom and Javier Sánchez were the defending champions, but none competed this year. Sánchez opted to compete at Schenectady during the same week.

David Prinosil and Richard Vogel won the title by defeating Sander Groen and Lars Koslowski 6–3, 6–7, 7–6 in the final.

== Seeds ==
1. (Czechoslovakia) Vojtěch Flégl / (Czechoslovakia) David Rikl (semifinals)
2. (United States) Brian Devening / (Kenya) Paul Wekesa (first round)
3. (Italy) Cristian Brandi / (Italy) Federico Mordegan (first round)
4. (Netherlands) Sander Groen / (Germany) Lars Koslowski (final)

== Draw ==
=== Key ===
- Q = Qualifier
- WC = Wild card
- LL = Lucky loser
- Alt = Alternate
- ITF = ITF entry
- PR = Protected ranking
- SR = Special ranking
- SE = Special exempt
- JE = Junior exempt
- JR = Junior Accelerator Programme entrant
- CO = College Accelerator Programme entrant
- NG = Next Gen Accelerator Program entrant
- w/o = Walkover
- r = Retired
- d = Defaulted

=== Draw ===
First round
1	(Czechoslovakia) V Flégl (Czechoslovakia) D Rikl	7	6
Q	(Italy) M Cierro (Italy) M Valeri	5	2
(Sweden) J Donar (Sweden) O Jonsson	6	6
WC	(Italy) C Brandi (Italy) F Mordegan	3	3
3	(Italy) C Brandi (Italy) F Mordegan	6	6	3
(Spain) J Arrese (Spain) À Corretja	7	1	6
(Germany) D Prinosil (Czechoslovakia) R Vogel	7	7
WC	(Ukraine) A Medvedev (Austria) T Muster	5	5
(Italy) R Furlan (Argentina) G Pérez Roldán	3	4
(Argentina) F Davín (Argentina) H de la Peña	6	6
(Spain) JF Altur (Spain) V Solves	2	5
4	(Netherlands) S Groen (Germany) L Koslowski	6	7
(Australia) J Ireland (Czechoslovakia) M Střelba	2	6	3
(Argentina) G Luza (Argentina) D Orsanic	6	3	6
(Spain) JC Báguena (Venezuela) A Mora	7	6	6
2	(United States) B Devening (Kenya) P Wekesa	5	7	3

Quarterfinals
1	(Czechoslovakia) V Flégl (Czechoslovakia) D Rikl	6	6
(Sweden) J Donar (Sweden) O Jonsson	2	4
(Spain) J Arrese (Spain) À Corretja	1	4
(Germany) D Prinosil (Czechoslovakia) R Vogel	6	6
(Argentina) F Davín (Argentina) H de la Peña
4	(Netherlands) S Groen (Germany) L Koslowski	w/o
(Argentina) G Luza (Argentina) D Orsanic	7	6
(Spain) JC Báguena (Venezuela) A Mora	5	3

Semifinals
1	(Czechoslovakia) V Flégl (Czechoslovakia) D Rikl	7	4	2
(Germany) D Prinosil (Czechoslovakia) R Vogel	6	6	6
4	(Netherlands) S Groen (Germany) L Koslowski	6	6
(Argentina) G Luza (Argentina) D Orsanic	4	3

Final
(Germany) D Prinosil (Czechoslovakia) R Vogel	6	6	7
4	(Netherlands) S Groen (Germany) L Koslowski	3	7	6
