= 1995 Torneo Godó – Doubles =

Doubles
- 1995 Torneo Godó

Final
- Champions: (United States) Trevor Kronemann (Australia) David Macpherson
- Runners-up: (Italy) Andrea Gaudenzi (Croatia) Goran Ivanišević
- Score: 6–2, 6–4

Details
- Draw: 28 (4WC/2Q)
- Seeds: 8

Events
Singles	Doubles
← 1994 ·	Barcelona Open	· 1996 →

Yevgeny Kafelnikov and David Rikl were the defending champions, but lost in the second round to Wayne Arthurs and Donald Johnson.

Trevor Kronemann and David Macpherson won the title by defeating qualifiers Andrea Gaudenzi and Goran Ivanišević 6–2, 6–4 in the final.

== Seeds ==
The top four seeds receive a bye into the second round.

1. (Netherlands) Jacco Eltingh / (Netherlands) Paul Haarhuis (second round)
2. (South Africa) David Adams / (Russia) Andrei Olhovskiy (second round)
3. (Russia) Yevgeny Kafelnikov / (Czech Republic) David Rikl (second round)
4. (France) Olivier Delaître / (South Africa) Piet Norval (quarterfinals)
5. (Sweden) Nicklas Kulti / (Sweden) Magnus Larsson (semifinals)
6. (Spain) Sergio Casal / (Spain) Emilio Sánchez (semifinals)
7. (Czech Republic) Karel Nováček / (Czech Republic) Cyril Suk (second round)
8. (Argentina) Luis Lobo / (Spain) Javier Sánchez (second round)

== Draw ==
=== Key ===
- Q = Qualifier
- WC = Wild card
- LL = Lucky loser
- Alt = Alternate
- ITF = ITF entry
- PR = Protected ranking
- SR = Special ranking
- SE = Special exempt
- JE = Junior exempt
- JR = Junior Accelerator Programme entrant
- CO = College Accelerator Programme entrant
- NG = Next Gen Accelerator Program entrant
- w/o = Walkover
- r = Retired
- d = Defaulted

=== Finals ===
Semifinals
Q	(Italy) Andrea Gaudenzi (Croatia) Goran Ivanišević	6	6
6	(Spain) Sergio Casal (Spain) Emilio Sánchez	1	4
5	(Sweden) Nicklas Kulti (Sweden) Magnus Larsson	6	4
(United States) Trevor Kronemann (Australia) David Macpherson	7	6

Final
Q	(Italy) Andrea Gaudenzi (Croatia) Goran Ivanišević	2	4
(United States) Trevor Kronemann (Australia) David Macpherson	6	6

=== Top half ===
First round
Q	(Spain) J Arrese (Spain) JA Conde	3	0
Q	(Italy) A Gaudenzi (Croatia) G Ivanišević	6	6
(France) G Forget (United States) D Wheaton	4	6	6
WC	(Netherlands) R Krajicek (Ukraine) A Medvedev	6	3	4
WC	(United States) P Annacone (United States) P Sampras	0	4
8	(Argentina) L Lobo (Spain) J Sánchez	6	6
(Australia) W Arthurs (United States) D Johnson	6	1	6
(United States) R Leach (United States) S Melville	2	6	3
(Germany) MK Goellner (Italy) D Nargiso	6	7
(South Africa) B Haygarth (United States) J Waite	3	5
(Australia) J Ireland (Belgium) L Pimek	1	1
6	(Spain) S Casal (Spain) E Sánchez	6	6

Second round
1	(Netherlands) J Eltingh (Netherlands) P Haarhuis	4	7	4
Q	(Italy) A Gaudenzi (Croatia) G Ivanišević	6	6	6
(France) G Forget (United States) D Wheaton	6	6
8	(Argentina) L Lobo (Spain) J Sánchez	3	4
3	(Russia) Y Kafelnikov (Czech Republic) D Rikl	5	6	4
(Australia) W Arthurs (United States) D Johnson	7	3	6
(Germany) MK Goellner (Italy) D Nargiso	6	6	6
6	(Spain) S Casal (Spain) E Sánchez	3	7	7

Quarterfinals
Q	(Italy) A Gaudenzi (Croatia) G Ivanišević	6	6
(France) G Forget (United States) D Wheaton	2	4
(Australia) W Arthurs (United States) D Johnson	6	6
6	(Spain) S Casal (Spain) E Sánchez	7	7

Semifinals
Q	(Italy) A Gaudenzi (Croatia) G Ivanišević	6	6
6	(Spain) S Casal (Spain) E Sánchez	1	4

=== Bottom half ===
First round
5	(Sweden) N Kulti (Sweden) M Larsson	7	7
(United States) D Randall (United States) G Van Emburgh	6	6
WC	(Spain) A Berasategui (Spain) J Burillo	6	7
(Netherlands) T Nijssen (Netherlands) M Oosting	2	6
WC	(Spain) S Bruguera (Spain) C Costa	6	6	7
(Czech Republic) V Flégl (Netherlands) T Kempers	2	7	5
7	(Czech Republic) K Nováček (Czech Republic) C Suk	6	6
(Spain) T Carbonell (Spain) F Roig	2	3
(Sweden) R Bergh (Germany) U Riglewski	3	2
(United States) T Kronemann (Australia) D Macpherson	6	6
(United States) M Bauer (South Africa) B Talbot	4	6	3
(United States) L Jensen (United States) M Jensen	6	3	6

Second round
5	(Sweden) N Kulti (Sweden) M Larsson	6	6	6
WC	(Spain) A Berasategui (Spain) J Burillo	3	7	3
WC	(Spain) S Bruguera (Spain) C Costa	3	1
4	(France) O Delaître (South Africa) P Norval	6	6
7	(Czech Republic) K Nováček (Czech Republic) C Suk	1	6	5
(United States) T Kronemann (Australia) D Macpherson	6	1	7
(United States) L Jensen (United States) M Jensen	6	6
2	(South Africa) D Adams (Russia) A Olhovskiy	4	4

Quarterfinals
5	(Sweden) N Kulti (Sweden) M Larsson	6	6
4	(France) O Delaître (South Africa) P Norval	2	4
(United States) T Kronemann (Australia) D Macpherson	6	7
(United States) L Jensen (United States) M Jensen	2	6

Semifinals
5	(Sweden) N Kulti (Sweden) M Larsson	6	4
(United States) T Kronemann (Australia) D Macpherson	7	6
