= Buljević =

Buljević is a Croatian family name.

Among those with the surname are:

- Branko Buljevic (born 1947), Croatian-born, naturalized Australian footballer
- Damir Buljević (born 1965), Croatian tennis player
- Ketrin Buljević, Croatian writer and poet
- Marco Buljević (born 1987), German basketball player
- Pedro Ossandón Buljevic (born 1957), Chilean bishop
