= 1993 Torneo Godó – Doubles =

Doubles
- 1993 Torneo Godó

Final
- Champions: (United States) Shelby Cannon (United States) Scott Melville
- Runners-up: (Spain) Sergio Casal (Spain) Emilio Sánchez
- Score: 7–6, 6–1

Details
- Draw: 28 (4WC/2Q)
- Seeds: 8

Events
Singles	Doubles
← 1992 ·	Barcelona Open	· 1994 →

The 1993 Torneo Godó was the forty-first edition of the Torneo Godó and it took place from 5 to 12 April 1993.

Andrés Gómez and Javier Sánchez were the defending champions, but Gómez did not compete this year. Javier Sánchez teamed up with Magnus Gustafsson and lost in the quarterfinals to Sergio Casal and Emilio Sánchez.

Shelby Cannon and Scott Melville won the title by defeating Casal and Emilio Sánchez 7–6, 6–1 in the final.

== Seeds ==
The first four seeds received a bye to the second round.

1. (South Africa) Danie Visser / (Australia) Laurie Warder (quarterfinals)
2. (United States) Steve DeVries / (Australia) David Macpherson (semifinals)
3. (Netherlands) Tom Nijssen / (Czech Republic) Cyril Suk (second round)
4. (South Africa) David Adams / (Russia) Andrei Olhovskiy (second round)
5. (Spain) Sergio Casal / (Spain) Emilio Sánchez (final)
6. (United States) Shelby Cannon / (United States) Scott Melville (champions)
7. (South Africa) Stefan Kruger / (South Africa) Piet Norval (quarterfinals)
8. (Netherlands) Hendrik Jan Davids / (Belgium) Libor Pimek (first round)

== Draw ==
=== Key ===
- Q = Qualifier
- WC = Wild card
- LL = Lucky loser
- Alt = Alternate
- ITF = ITF entry
- PR = Protected ranking
- SR = Special ranking
- SE = Special exempt
- JE = Junior exempt
- JR = Junior Accelerator Programme entrant
- CO = College Accelerator Programme entrant
- NG = Next Gen Accelerator Program entrant
- w/o = Walkover
- r = Retired
- d = Defaulted

=== Finals ===
Semifinals
(Netherlands) Mark Koevermans (Netherlands) Richard Krajicek	5	2
5	(Spain) Sergio Casal (Spain) Emilio Sánchez	7	6
6	(United States) Shelby Cannon (United States) Scott Melville	7	7
2	(United States) Steve DeVries (Australia) David Macpherson	6	6

Final
5	(Spain) Sergio Casal (Spain) Emilio Sánchez	6	1
6	(United States) Shelby Cannon (United States) Scott Melville	7	6

=== Top half ===
First round
(United States) B Garnett (United States) TJ Middleton	5	6
(Spain) F Clavet (South Africa) B Haygarth	7	7
WC	(Spain) J Burillo (Spain) D de Miguel	7	7
(Latvia) Ģ Dzelde (United States) G Van Emburgh	5	6
(Netherlands) M Koevermans (Netherlands) R Krajicek	7	6
8	(Netherlands) HJ Davids (Belgium) L Pimek	6	2
WC	(Sweden) M Gustafsson (Spain) J Sánchez	3	6	6
(Australia) C Limberger (Czech Republic) T Zdražila	6	1	3
(United States) I Lendl (Czech Republic) K Nováček	6	3	3
(Sweden) R Båthman (Sweden) T Svantesson	3	6	6
(Netherlands) M Oosting (Germany) U Riglewski	7	3	4
5	(Spain) S Casal (Spain) E Sánchez	6	6	6

Second round
1	(South Africa) D Visser (Australia) L Warder	2	6	6
(Spain) F Clavet (South Africa) B Haygarth	6	1	4
WC	(Spain) J Burillo (Spain) D de Miguel	3	5
(Netherlands) M Koevermans (Netherlands) R Krajicek	6	7
3	(Netherlands) T Nijssen (Czech Republic) C Suk	2	2
WC	(Sweden) M Gustafsson (Spain) J Sánchez	6	6
(Sweden) R Båthman (Sweden) T Svantesson	7	2	6
5	(Spain) S Casal (Spain) E Sánchez	6	6	7

Quarterfinals
1	(South Africa) D Visser (Australia) L Warder	5	3
(Netherlands) M Koevermans (Netherlands) R Krajicek	7	6
WC	(Sweden) M Gustafsson (Spain) J Sánchez	0	4
5	(Spain) S Casal (Spain) E Sánchez	6	6

Semifinals
(Netherlands) M Koevermans (Netherlands) R Krajicek	5	2
5	(Spain) S Casal (Spain) E Sánchez	7	6

=== Bottom half ===
First round
6	(United States) S Cannon (United States) S Melville	6	6
(Sweden) J Donar (Sweden) O Jonsson	3	3
(United States) M Bauer (Denmark) M Mortensen	6	6
WC	(Spain) JF Altur (Spain) A Berasategui	4	4
Q	(Belgium) F Dewulf (Sweden) LA Wahlgren	6	3	1
WC	(Russia) Y Kafelnikov (Ukraine) A Medvedev	1	6	6
7	(South Africa) S Kruger (South Africa) P Norval	3	6	6
Q	(Spain) JC Báguena (Spain) À Corretja	6	2	3
(Sweden) C Allgårdh (Finland) O Rahnasto	6	5
(France) O Delaître (Croatia) G Prpić	7	7
(Spain) T Carbonell (Spain) C Costa	6	6
(Czech Republic) V Flégl (Spain) F Roig	3	2

Second round
6	(United States) S Cannon (United States) S Melville	6	7	6
(United States) M Bauer (Denmark) M Mortensen	7	5	1
WC	(Russia) Y Kafelnikov (Ukraine) A Medvedev	7	6
4	(South Africa) D Adams (Russia) A Olhovskiy	6	3
7	(South Africa) S Kruger (South Africa) P Norval	5	6	6
(France) O Delaître (Croatia) G Prpić	7	1	4
(Spain) T Carbonell (Spain) C Costa	5	6	2
2	(United States) S DeVries (Australia) D Macpherson	7	3	6

Quarterfinals
6	(United States) S Cannon (United States) S Melville	6	7
WC	(Russia) Y Kafelnikov (Ukraine) A Medvedev	3	5
7	(South Africa) S Kruger (South Africa) P Norval	3	5
2	(United States) S DeVries (Australia) D Macpherson	6	7

Semifinals
6	(United States) S Cannon (United States) S Melville	7	7
2	(United States) S DeVries (Australia) D Macpherson	6	6
