= 1992 Torneo Godó – Singles =

Singles
- 1992 Torneo Godó

Final
- Champion: (Spain) Carlos Costa
- Runner-up: (Sweden) Magnus Gustafsson
- Score: 6–4, 7–6^{(7–3)}, 6–4

Details
- Draw: 56 (3WC/7Q/1LL)
- Seeds: 16

Events
Singles	Doubles
← 1991 ·	Barcelona Open	· 1993 →

Emilio Sánchez was the defending champion, but lost in the second round to Francisco Roig.

Carlos Costa won the title by defeating Magnus Gustafsson 6–4, 7–6^{(7–3)}, 6–4 in the final.

== Seeds ==
The first eight seeds received a bye into the second round.

1. (Germany) Boris Becker (second round)
2. (United States) Ivan Lendl (quarterfinals)
3. (Spain) Emilio Sánchez (second round)
4. (Czechoslovakia) Karel Nováček (second round)
5. (Spain) Sergi Bruguera (semifinals)
6. (United States) Andre Agassi (second round)
7. (Argentina) Alberto Mancini (semifinals)
8. (Sweden) Magnus Gustafsson (final)
9. (Spain) Francisco Clavet (third round)
10. (Russia) Andrei Cherkasov (first round)
11. (Croatia) Goran Prpić (first round)
12. (Italy) Omar Camporese (first round)
13. (Spain) Jordi Arrese (second round)
14. (Spain) Javier Sánchez (third round)
15. (Austria) Thomas Muster (third round)
16. (Austria) Horst Skoff (quarterfinals)

== Draw ==
Key

- Q = Qualifier
- WC = Wild card
- LL = Lucky loser
- Alt = Alternate
- ITF = ITF entry
- PR = Protected ranking
- SR = Special ranking
- SE = Special exempt
- JE = Junior exempt
- JR = Junior Accelerator Programme entrant
- CO = College Accelerator Programme entrant
- NG = Next Gen Accelerator Program entrant
- w/o = Walkover
- r = Retired
- d = Defaulted

=== Finals ===
Quarterfinals
16	(Austria) Horst Skoff	3	2
8	(Sweden) Magnus Gustafsson	6	6
(Sweden) Jonas Svensson	4	4
5	(Spain) Sergi Bruguera	6	6
(Spain) Carlos Costa	7^{7}	6
(France) Rodolphe Gilbert	6^{2}	3
7	(Argentina) Alberto Mancini	3	6	6
2	(United States) Ivan Lendl	6	3	4

Semifinals
8	(Sweden) Magnus Gustafsson	6	7
5	(Spain) Sergi Bruguera	4	5
(Spain) Carlos Costa	6	6
7	(Argentina) Alberto Mancini	3	3

Final
8	(Sweden) Magnus Gustafsson	4	6^{3}	4
(Spain) Carlos Costa	6	7^{7}	6

=== Top half ===
==== Section 1 ====
First round
(Germany) CU Steeb	4	6^{4}
Q	(Spain) J Burillo	6	7^{7}
(France) F Fontang	6	6
(Germany) L Koslowski	1	4
(Argentina) R Azar	3	3
16	(Austria) H Skoff	6	6
10	(Russia) A Cherkasov	3	6^{4}
(Argentina) F Davín	6	7^{7}
Q	(Spain) JL Aparisi	1	2
LL	(Sweden) N Kulti	6	6
Q	(Spain) À Corretja	6	6^{3}	7
WC	(Spain) S Casal	2	7^{7}	5

Second round
1	(Germany) B Becker	6	6^{2}	4
Q	(Spain) J Burillo	1	7^{7}	6
(France) F Fontang	4	2
16	(Austria) H Skoff	6	6
(Argentina) F Davín	4	6	3
LL	(Sweden) N Kulti	6	1	6
Q	(Spain) À Corretja	7	6^{5}	1
8	(Sweden) M Gustafsson	5	7^{7}	6

Third round
Q	(Spain) J Burillo	6^{4}	3
16	(Austria) H Skoff	7^{7}	6
LL	(Sweden) N Kulti	6	2	0
8	(Sweden) M Gustafsson	4	6	6

Quarterfinals
16	(Austria) H Skoff	3	2
8	(Sweden) M Gustafsson	6	6

==== Section 2 ====
First round
WC	(Spain) A Berasategui	2	6^{6}
(Spain) F Roig	6	7^{8}
(France) C Pioline	5	6	3
(Sweden) J Svensson	7	3	6
Q	(Spain) M Górriz	4	6^{5}
13	(Spain) J Arrese	6	7^{7}
11	(Croatia) G Prpić	2	6	6^{3}
(Argentina) M Jaite	6	3	7^{7}
(Argentina) G Markus	1	0^{r}
(Spain) T Carbonell	6	1
(Italy) C Pistolesi	6	3	4
(Ecuador) A Gómez	3	6	6

Second round
3	(Spain) E Sánchez	4	4
(Spain) F Roig	6	6
(Sweden) J Svensson	7^{7}	6
13	(Spain) J Arrese	6^{5}	3
(Argentina) M Jaite	7^{7}	6
(Spain) T Carbonell	6^{5}	2
(Ecuador) A Gómez	5	2
5	(Spain) S Bruguera	7	6

Third round
(Spain) F Roig	7^{7}	0	6^{3}
(Sweden) J Svensson	6^{3}	6	7^{7}
(Argentina) M Jaite	5	1
5	(Spain) S Bruguera	7	6

Quarterfinals
(Sweden) J Svensson	4	4
5	(Spain) S Bruguera	6	6

=== Bottom half ===
==== Section 3 ====
First round
(Sweden) J Gunnarsson	6	4	2
(Netherlands) J Eltingh	3	6	6
(Italy) R Furlan	2	5
(Spain) C Costa	6	7
(Uruguay) M Filippini	6	6
12	(Italy) O Camporese	2	3
14	(Spain) J Sánchez	4	7	6
(Haiti) R Agénor	6	5	1
(Argentina) C Miniussi	6	6
(Belgium) B Wuyts	2	1
(France) R Gilbert	6	6
WC	(Spain) JA Viloca	2	2

Second round
6	(United States) A Agassi	4	6	1
(Netherlands) J Eltingh	6	1	6
(Spain) C Costa	6	6
(Uruguay) M Filippini	4	4
14	(Spain) J Sánchez	7^{12}	7^{9}
(Argentina) C Miniussi	6^{10}	6^{7}
(France) R Gilbert	2	7	7
4	(Czechoslovakia) K Nováček	6	5	5

Third round
(Netherlands) J Eltingh	6^{3}	6^{5}
(Spain) C Costa	7^{7}	7^{7}
14	(Spain) J Sánchez	6^{4}	3
(France) R Gilbert	7^{7}	6

Quarterfinals
(Spain) C Costa	7^{7}	6
(France) R Gilbert	6^{2}	3

==== Section 4 ====
First round
(Netherlands) M Koevermans	6^{2}	6	6
(Argentina) H de la Peña	7^{7}	1	4
(Sweden) M Larsson	6	6
Q	(Italy) M Valeri	4	1
(Belgium) E Masso	7^{8}	2	6^{3}
9	(Spain) F Clavet	6^{6}	6	7^{7}
15	(Austria) T Muster	1	6	6
(Finland) V Paloheimo	6	4	2
(Spain) G López	3	3
Q	(Spain) JF Altur	6	6
Q	(Georgia (country)) Ģ Dzelde	5	4
(France) T Champion	7	6

Second round
7	(Argentina) A Mancini	6	2	7
(Netherlands) M Koevermans	4	6	5
(Sweden) M Larsson	1	6	2
9	(Spain) F Clavet	6	4	6
15	(Austria) T Muster	6	4	6
Q	(Spain) JF Altur	3	6	3
(France) T Champion	7^{7}	3	1
2	(United States) I Lendl	6^{4}	6	6

Third round
7	(Argentina) A Mancini	7^{7}	6
9	(Spain) F Clavet	6^{4}	0
15	(Austria) T Muster	3	4
2	(United States) I Lendl	6	6

Quarterfinals
7	(Argentina) A Mancini	3	6	6
2	(United States) I Lendl	6	3	4
