= 1995 Torneo Godó – Singles =

Singles
- 1995 Torneo Godó

Final
- Champion: (Austria) Thomas Muster
- Runner-up: (Sweden) Magnus Larsson
- Score: 6–2, 6–1, 6–4

Details
- Draw: 56 (5WC/7Q)
- Seeds: 16

Events
Singles	Doubles
← 1994 ·	Barcelona Open	· 1996 →

Richard Krajicek was the defending champion, but lost to Roberto Carretero in the second round.

Thomas Muster won the title, defeating Magnus Larsson 6–2, 6–1, 6–4 in the final.

== Seeds ==
The top eight seeds receive a bye into the second round.

1. (United States) Pete Sampras (second round)
2. (Spain) Sergi Bruguera (second round)
3. (Russia) Yevgeny Kafelnikov (semifinals)
4. (Spain) Alberto Berasategui (quarterfinals)
5. (Croatia) Goran Ivanišević (semifinals)
6. (Netherlands) Richard Krajicek (second round)
7. (Sweden) Magnus Larsson (final)
8. (Ukraine) Andrei Medvedev (second round)
9. (Austria) Thomas Muster (champion)
10. (Italy) Andrea Gaudenzi (first round)
11. (Netherlands) Jacco Eltingh (first round)
12. (Spain) Àlex Corretja (first round)
13. (Germany) Bernd Karbacher (second round)
14. (Czech Republic) Karel Nováček (third round)
15. (Czech Republic) Sláva Doseděl (first round)
16. (France) Guy Forget (second round)

== Draw ==
=== Key ===
- Q = Qualifier
- WC = Wild card
- LL = Lucky loser
- Alt = Alternate
- ITF = ITF entry
- PR = Protected ranking
- SR = Special ranking
- SE = Special exempt
- JE = Junior exempt
- JR = Junior Accelerator Programme entrant
- CO = College Accelerator Programme entrant
- NG = Next Gen Accelerator Program entrant
- w/o = Walkover
- r = Retired
- d = Defaulted

=== Finals ===
Quarterfinals
(Spain) Carlos Costa	3	6	5
9	(Austria) Thomas Muster	6	3	7
3	(Russia) Yevgeny Kafelnikov	6	6
Q	(France) Thierry Champion	4	3
5	(Croatia) Goran Ivanišević	1	6	6
4	(Spain) Alberto Berasategui	6	4	4
7	(Sweden) Magnus Larsson	6	6
(Spain) Jordi Arrese	3	1

Semifinals
9	(Austria) Thomas Muster	6	6
3	(Russia) Yevgeny Kafelnikov	3	3
5	(Croatia) Goran Ivanišević	4	6	4
7	(Sweden) Magnus Larsson	6	4	6

Final
9	(Austria) Thomas Muster	6	6	6
7	(Sweden) Magnus Larsson	2	1	4

=== Top half ===
==== Section 1 ====
First round
(United States) D Wheaton	2	6	2
(Germany) O Gross	6	4	6
(Spain) C Costa	6	6
(France) O Delaître	4	4
(Netherlands) P Haarhuis	0	6	6
15	(Czech Republic) S Doseděl	6	2	2
9	(Austria) T Muster	4	7^{7}	6
WC	(Spain) J Burillo	6	6^{2}	2
Q	(France) G Solvès	4	4
WC	(Russia) A Cherkasov	6	6
(Spain) J Sánchez	5	6	6
Q	(Czech Republic) B Ulihrach	7	0	1

Second round
1	(United States) P Sampras	6	2	3
(Germany) O Gross	1	6	6
(Spain) C Costa	6	6
(Netherlands) P Haarhuis	3	2
9	(Austria) T Muster	6	6
WC	(Russia) A Cherkasov	3	2
(Spain) J Sánchez	6	1	6
8	(Ukraine) A Medvedev	1	6	0

Third round
(Germany) O Gross	3	6^{2}
(Spain) C Costa	6	7^{7}
9	(Austria) T Muster	7^{7}	6
(Spain) J Sánchez	6^{5}	4

Quarterfinals
(Spain) C Costa	3	6	5
9	(Austria) T Muster	6	3	7

==== Section 2 ====
First round
(Austria) H Skoff	3	1
(Australia) R Fromberg	6	6
Q	(Chile) M Ríos	6	6
(Uruguay) M Filippini	2	0
Q	(Spain) JA Viloca-Puig	6	3	5
13	(Germany) B Karbacher	4	6	7
12	(Spain) À Corretja	4	7	3
Q	(France) T Champion	6	5	6
Q	(France) J Golmard	6	3	7^{9}
(Germany) M-K Goellner	2	6	6^{7}
WC	(Spain) R Carretero	3	6	6
WC	(Spain) F Roig	6	4	4

Second round
3	(Russia) Y Kafelnikov	6	6^{7}	6
(Australia) R Fromberg	2	7^{9}	2
Q	(Chile) M Ríos	6	6
13	(Germany) B Karbacher	3	3
Q	(France) T Champion	6	6
Q	(France) J Golmard	4	3
WC	(Spain) R Carretero	7	6
6	(Netherlands) R Krajicek	5	2

Third round
3	(Russia) Y Kafelnikov	6	6
Q	(Chile) M Ríos	4	3
Q	(France) T Champion	6	5	6
WC	(Spain) R Carretero	3	7	2

Quarterfinals
3	(Russia) Y Kafelnikov	6	6
Q	(France) T Champion	4	3

=== Bottom half ===
==== Section 3 ====
First round
(France) F Santoro	5	6	6
Q	(Hungary) S Noszály	7	1	2
(Argentina) F Davín	1	1
(Norway) C Ruud	6	6
(Spain) E Sánchez	6	6
11	(Netherlands) J Eltingh	4	4
14	(Czech Republic) K Nováček	6	6
(Slovakia) K Kučera	4	3
(Russia) A Olhovskiy	6^{4}	5
(Russia) A Chesnokov	7^{7}	7
(Spain) A Costa	2	3
(Peru) J Yzaga	6	6

Second round
5	(Croatia) G Ivanišević	6	6
(France) F Santoro	4	1
(Norway) C Ruud	6	6
(Spain) E Sánchez	0	4
14	(Czech Republic) K Nováček	6	2	6
(Russia) A Chesnokov	4	6	2
(Peru) J Yzaga	6^{2}	2
4	(Spain) A Berasategui	7^{7}	6

Third round
5	(Croatia) G Ivanišević	7	6
(Norway) C Ruud	5	1
14	(Czech Republic) K Nováček	3	6^{3}
4	(Spain) A Berasategui	6	7^{7}

Quarterfinals
5	(Croatia) G Ivanišević	1	6	6
4	(Spain) A Berasategui	6	4	4

==== Section 4 ====
First round
(Czech Republic) R Vašek	4	3
(Spain) Ó Martínez	6	6
(Spain) T Carbonell	3	6	7^{7}
(United States) B Shelton	6	4	6^{3}
WC	(France) H Leconte	6	3	6
10	(Italy) A Gaudenzi	2	6	4
16	(France) G Forget	7^{7}	6
(France) A Boetsch	6^{4}	3
(Spain) J Arrese	6	4	7^{7}
(Spain) F Clavet	2	6	6^{4}
(Austria) G Schaller	6	6
(United States) M Washington	2	4

Second round
7	(Sweden) M Larsson	3	7	6
(Spain) Ó Martínez	6	5	4
(Spain) T Carbonell	6	3	6
WC	(France) H Leconte	3	6	4
16	(France) G Forget	6	2	5
(Spain) J Arrese	2	6	7
(Austria) G Schaller	7	6
2	(Spain) S Bruguera	5	1

Third round
7	(Sweden) M Larsson	6	6
(Spain) T Carbonell	2	1
(Spain) J Arrese	6	7^{7}
(Austria) G Schaller	3	6^{4}

Quarterfinals
7	(Sweden) M Larsson	6	6
(Spain) J Arrese	3	1
