= 1990 Yugoslav Open – Singles =

Singles
- 1990 Yugoslav Open

Final
- Champion: (Socialist Federal Republic of Yugoslavia) Goran Prpić
- Runner-up: (Socialist Federal Republic of Yugoslavia) Goran Ivanišević
- Score: 6–3, 4-6, 6–4

Details
- Draw: 32 (3WC/4Q)
- Seeds: 8

Events
Singles	Doubles
- Croatia Open

The first edition of the ATP tournament in Umag was held from 14 May until 20 May 1990.

Goran Prpić won the title by defeating Goran Ivanišević 6–3, 4–6, 6–4 in the final.

== Seeds ==
1. (Socialist Federal Republic of Yugoslavia) Goran Prpić (champion)
2. (Socialist Federal Republic of Yugoslavia) Goran Ivanišević (final)
3. (Netherlands) Mark Koevermans (second round)
4. (Germany) Jens Woehrmann (first round)
5. (Soviet Union) Andrei Cherkasov (semifinals)
6. (Finland) Aki Rahunen (quarterfinals)
7. (Czechoslovakia) Marián Vajda (second round)
8. (France) Thierry Tulasne (first round)

== Draw ==
Key

- Q = Qualifier
- WC = Wild card
- LL = Lucky loser
- Alt = Alternate
- ITF = ITF entry
- PR = Protected ranking
- SR = Special ranking
- SE = Special exempt
- JE = Junior exempt
- JR = Junior Accelerator Programme entrant
- CO = College Accelerator Programme entrant
- NG = Next Gen Accelerator Program entrant
- w/o = Walkover
- r = Retired
- d = Defaulted

=== Finals ===
Semifinals
1	(Socialist Federal Republic of Yugoslavia) Goran Prpić	7	7
(Argentina) Horacio de la Peña	6	6
5/WC	(Soviet Union) Andrei Cherkasov	3	7	4
2	(Socialist Federal Republic of Yugoslavia) Goran Ivanišević	6	5	6

Final
1	(Socialist Federal Republic of Yugoslavia) Goran Prpić	6	4	6
2	(Socialist Federal Republic of Yugoslavia) Goran Ivanišević	3	6	4

=== Top half ===
First round
1	(Socialist Federal Republic of Yugoslavia) G Prpić	6	6	6
Q	(Belgium) E Masso	7	4	0
(Denmark) M Tauson	6	4
(Uruguay) D Perez	7	6
(Uruguay) R Azar	6	6
Q	(Netherlands) P Dogger	2	3
WC	(Italy) F Cancellotti	4	1
7	(Czechoslovakia) M Vajda	6	6
3	(Netherlands) M Koevermans	7	6
WC	(Socialist Federal Republic of Yugoslavia) S Hiršzon	6	3
(Argentina) E Bengoechea	7	2	0
(Argentina) H de la Peña	5	6	6
(Portugal) N Marques	4	7	6
(Sweden) L Jönsson	6	5	3
(Israel) G Bloom	5	4
6	(Finland) A Rahunen	7	6

Second round
1	(Socialist Federal Republic of Yugoslavia) G Prpić	6	6
(Uruguay) D Perez	2	0
(Uruguay) R Azar	0	7^{7}	6
7	(Czechoslovakia) M Vajda	6	6	3
3	(Netherlands) M Koevermans	6	3
(Argentina) H de la Peña	7	6
(Portugal) N Marques	6	4
6	(Finland) A Rahunen	7	6

Quarterfinals
1	(Socialist Federal Republic of Yugoslavia) G Prpić	6	6
(Argentina) R Azar	4	4
(Argentina) H de la Peña	5	7	6
6	(Finland) A Rahunen	7	6	1

Semifinals
1	(Socialist Federal Republic of Yugoslavia) G Prpić	7	7
(Argentina) H de la Peña	6	6

=== Bottom half ===
First round
5/WC	(Soviet Union) A Cherkasov	6	6
Q	(Spain) J Clavet	2	4
(France) O Delaître	6	4
(Spain) F Roig	7	6
Q	(Socialist Federal Republic of Yugoslavia) D Buljević	6	6
(Australia) J Anderson	3	4
(Germany) E Jelen	6	3	6
4	(Germany) J Woehrmann	1	6	0
8	(France) T Tulasne	6	3	1
(France) J Potier	3	6	6
(Germany) C Saceanu	2	2
(France) T Benhabiles	6	6
(Cuba) M Tabares	4	4
(Spain) F Luna	6	6
(Venezuela) N Pereira	1	4
2	(Socialist Federal Republic of Yugoslavia) G Ivanišević	6	6

Second round
5/WC	(Soviet Union) A Cherkasov	6	6
(Spain) F Roig	3	4
Q	(Socialist Federal Republic of Yugoslavia) D Buljević	6	3	6
(Germany) E Jelen	2	6	7
(France) J Potier	2	6	6
(France) T Benhabiles	6	3	7
(Spain) F Luna	2	3
2	(Socialist Federal Republic of Yugoslavia) G Ivanišević	6	6

Quarterfinals
5/WC	(Soviet Union) A Cherkasov	6	6
(Germany) E Jelen	2	0
(France) T Benhabiles	4	6
2	(Socialist Federal Republic of Yugoslavia) G Ivanišević	6	7

Semifinals
5/WC	(Soviet Union) A Cherkasov	3	7	4
2	(Socialist Federal Republic of Yugoslavia) G Ivanišević	6	5	6
