= 1994 Trofeo Conde de Godó – Singles =

Singles
- 1994 Trofeo Conde de Godó

Final
- Champion: (Netherlands) Richard Krajicek
- Runner-up: (Spain) Carlos Costa
- Score: 6–4, 7–6^{(8–6)}, 6–2

Details
- Draw: 56 (5WC/7Q)
- Seeds: 16

Events
Singles	Doubles
← 1993 ·	Barcelona Open	· 1995 →

Andrei Medvedev was the defending champion, but lost in the second round to Ronald Agénor.

Richard Krajicek won the title by defeating Carlos Costa 6–4, 7–6, 6–2 in the final.

== Seeds ==
The first eight seeds received a bye into the second round.

1. (United States) Jim Courier (second round)
2. (Spain) Sergi Bruguera (quarterfinals)
3. (Ukraine) Andrei Medvedev (second round)
4. (Sweden) Magnus Gustafsson (second round)
5. (Austria) Thomas Muster (second round)
6. (Spain) Carlos Costa (final)
7. (Netherlands) Richard Krajicek (champion)
8. (Peru) Jaime Yzaga (second round)
9. (Czech Republic) Karel Nováček (first round)
10. (Russia) Andrei Chesnokov (third round)
11. (Spain) Javier Sánchez (first round)
12. (Russia) Yevgeny Kafelnikov (first round)
13. (Italy) Renzo Furlan (first round)
14. (Sweden) Jonas Svensson (first round)
15. (Spain) Alberto Berasategui (third round)
16. (Sweden) Magnus Larsson (first round)

== Draw ==
=== Key ===
- Q = Qualifier
- WC = Wild card
- LL = Lucky loser
- Alt = Alternate
- ITF = ITF entry
- PR = Protected ranking
- SR = Special ranking
- SE = Special exempt
- JE = Junior exempt
- JR = Junior Accelerator Programme entrant
- CO = College Accelerator Programme entrant
- NG = Next Gen Accelerator Program entrant
- w/o = Walkover
- r = Retired
- d = Defaulted

=== Finals ===
Quarterfinals
(Spain) Àlex Corretja	4	6	6
(Spain) Jordi Arrese	6	4	3
(Spain) Tomás Carbonell	1	3
6	(Spain) Carlos Costa	6	6
(Italy) Andrea Gaudenzi	6^{8}	3
(Haiti) Ronald Agénor	7^{10}	6
7	(Netherlands) Richard Krajicek	7	6
2	(Spain) Sergi Bruguera	5	3

Semifinals
(Spain) Àlex Corretja	3	3
6	(Spain) Carlos Costa	6	6
(Haiti) Ronald Agénor	4	2
7	(Netherlands) Richard Krajicek	6	6

Final
6	(Spain) Carlos Costa	4	6^{6}	2
7	(Netherlands) Richard Krajicek	6	7^{8}	6

=== Top half ===
==== Section 1 ====
First round
(Czech Republic) S Doseděl	1	4
(Spain) À Corretja	6	6
(Spain) E Sánchez	4	4
(Uruguay) M Filippini	6	6
(Sweden) N Kulti	6	6
16	(Sweden) M Larsson	4	4
9	(Czech Republic) K Nováček	2	5
(Spain) J Arrese	6	7
Q	(Czech Republic) T Anzari	3	3
(Morocco) Y El Aynaoui	6	6
(France) JP Fleurian	4	6	6
(France) O Delaître	6	4	1

Second round
1	(United States) J Courier	2	6	3
(Spain) À Corretja	6	3	6
(Uruguay) M Filippini	6	1	6^{1}
(Sweden) N Kulti	4	6	7^{7}
(Spain) J Arrese	7	6
(Morocco) Y El Aynaoui	5	3
(France) JP Fleurian	6	6^{9}	6
8	(Peru) J Yzaga	3	7^{11}	2

Third round
(Spain) À Corretja	1	6	6
(Sweden) N Kulti	6	4	1
(Spain) J Arrese	7	6
(France) JP Fleurian	5	4

Quarterfinals
(Spain) À Corretja	4	6	6
(Spain) J Arrese	6	4	3

==== Section 2 ====
First round
(Spain) T Carbonell	3	6	7^{7}
(Czech Republic) D Rikl	6	3	6^{3}
WC	(Spain) E Nicolás	4	4
(Argentina) H de la Peña	6	6
WC	(Spain) F Roig	6	6
14	(Sweden) J Svensson	3	2
11	(Spain) J Sánchez	3	6	3
(Spain) J Burillo	6	2	6
(Austria) G Schaller	6	6
(France) R Gilbert	2	4
(Russia) A Cherkasov	6	7^{7}
Q	(Italy) M Meneschincheri	2	6^{3}

Second round
4	(Sweden) M Gustafsson	3	1
(Spain) T Carbonell	6	6
(Argentina) H de la Peña	4	7	6^{4}
WC	(Spain) F Roig	6	5	7^{7}
(Spain) J Burillo	6	6
(Austria) G Schaller	4	2
(Russia) A Cherkasov	4	4
6	(Spain) C Costa	6	6

Third round
(Spain) T Carbonell	6	6
WC	(Spain) F Roig	2	2
(Spain) J Burillo	2	4
6	(Spain) C Costa	6	6

Quarterfinals
(Spain) T Carbonell	1	3
6	(Spain) C Costa	6	6

=== Bottom half ===
==== Section 3 ====
First round
WC	(Spain) A Costa	6	6^{6}	6^{2}
(Italy) A Gaudenzi	3	7^{8}	7^{7}
WC	(Chile) M Ríos	6	6
Q	(Slovakia) M Vajda	3	2
WC	(Spain) R Carretero	6	6
12	(Russia) Y Kafelnikov	2	4
13	(Italy) R Furlan	6^{9}	1
(Germany) B Karbacher	7^{11}	6
Q	(Netherlands) T Nijssen	5	1
Q	(Sweden) N Utgren	7	6
(Haiti) R Agénor	6	7
(Australia) R Fromberg	3	5

Second round
5	(Austria) T Muster	0	6	3
(Italy) A Gaudenzi	6	4	6
WC	(Chile) M Ríos	7^{7}	7^{7}
WC	(Spain) R Carretero	6^{1}	6^{5}
(Germany) B Karbacher	4	6	4
Q	(Sweden) N Utgren	6	3	6
(Haiti) R Agénor	6^{3}	6	6
3	(Ukraine) A Medvedev	7^{7}	3	3

Third round
(Italy) A Gaudenzi	6	6
WC	(Chile) M Ríos	1	1
Q	(Sweden) N Utgren	6^{5}	1
(Haiti) R Agénor	7^{7}	6

Quarterfinals
(Italy) A Gaudenzi	6^{8}	3
(Haiti) R Agénor	7^{10}	6

==== Section 4 ====
First round
Q	(Germany) D Prinosil	2	4
(France) F Santoro	6	6
(Germany) CU Steeb	3	3
(Germany) K Braasch	6	6
Q	(Argentina) G Markus	3	2
10	(Russia) A Chesnokov	6	6
15	(Spain) A Berasategui	6	6
(Italy) D Nargiso	4	4
(Sweden) L Jönsson	4	4
(Argentina) F Davín	6	6
(Spain) F Clavet	6	6
(Brazil) F Meligeni	4	1

Second round
7	(Netherlands) R Krajicek	7	6
(France) F Santoro	5	2
(Germany) K Braasch	4	7^{7}	5
10	(Russia) A Chesnokov	6	6^{3}	7
15	(Spain) A Berasategui	6	7^{8}
(Argentina) F Davín	4	6^{6}
(Spain) F Clavet	0	1
2	(Spain) S Bruguera	6	6

Third round
7	(Netherlands) R Krajicek	7^{9}	6
10	(Russia) A Chesnokov	6^{7}	3
15	(Spain) A Berasategui	4	3
2	(Spain) S Bruguera	6	6

Quarterfinals
7	(Netherlands) R Krajicek	7	6
2	(Spain) S Bruguera	5	3
