= 1991 Yugoslav Open =

- Date: 13–19 May
- Edition: 2nd
- Category: World Series
- Draw: 32S / 16D
- Prize money: $215,000
- Surface: Clay / outdoor
- Location: Umag, Yugoslavia (current Croatia)

Champions

Singles
- (Soviet Union) Dimitri Poliakov

Doubles
- (Israel) Gilad Bloom / (Spain) Javier Sánchez
← 1990 ·	Croatia Open	· 1992 →

The 1991 Yugoslav Open was a men's tennis tournament played on outdoor clay courts in Umag, Yugoslavia that was part of the World Series (Designated Week) of the 1991 ATP Tour. It was the second edition of the tournament and was held from 13 May until 19 May 1991. Unseeded Dimitri Poliakov, who entered the main draw as a qualifier, won the singles title.

== Finals ==
=== Singles ===
(Soviet Union) Dimitri Poliakov defeated (Spain) Javier Sánchez, 6–4, 6–4

- It was Poliakov's only singles title of his career.

=== Doubles ===
(Israel) Gilad Bloom / (Spain) Javier Sánchez defeated (United States) Richey Reneberg / (United States) David Wheaton, 7–6, 2–6, 6–1

- It was Bloom's 2nd doubles title of the year and the 4th and last of his career. It was Sánchez' 2nd doubles title of the year and the 13th of his career.
