= 1996 Trofeo Conde de Godó – Singles =

Singles
- 1996 Trofeo Conde de Godó

Final
- Champion: (Austria) Thomas Muster
- Runner-up: (Chile) Marcelo Ríos
- Score: 6–3, 4–6, 6–4, 6–1

Details
- Draw: 56
- Seeds: 16

Events
Singles	Doubles
- Trofeo Conde de Godó

Thomas Muster was the defending champion and won in the final 6–3, 4–6, 6–4, 6–1 against Marcelo Ríos.

== Seeds ==
A champion seed is indicated in bold text while text in italics indicates the round in which that seed was eliminated. The top eight seeds received a bye to the second round.

1. (Austria) **Thomas Muster (champion)**
2. (United States) Jim Courier (semifinals)
3. (Russia) Yevgeny Kafelnikov (second round)
4. (Spain) Sergi Bruguera (third round)
5. (Switzerland) Marc Rosset (second round)
6. (Chile) Marcelo Ríos (final)
7. (Ukraine) Andriy Medvedev (second round)
8. (United States) Todd Martin (quarterfinals)
9. (Austria) Gilbert Schaller (first round)
10. (Italy) Renzo Furlan (third round)
11. (Spain) Albert Costa (third round)
12. (Netherlands) Paul Haarhuis (second round)
13. (Spain) Carlos Costa (first round)
14. (Spain) Alberto Berasategui (quarterfinals)
15. (Czech Republic) Jiří Novák (second round)
16. (Czech Republic) Bohdan Ulihrach (third round)

== Draw ==
Key

- Q = Qualifier
- WC = Wild card
- LL = Lucky loser
- Alt = Alternate
- ITF = ITF entry
- PR = Protected ranking
- SR = Special ranking
- SE = Special exempt
- JE = Junior exempt
- JR = Junior Accelerator Programme entrant
- CO = College Accelerator Programme entrant
- NG = Next Gen Accelerator Program entrant
- w/o = Walkover
- r = Retired
- d = Defaulted

=== Finals ===
Semifinals
WC/1	(Austria) **Thomas Muster**	4	**6**	**6**
(Spain) Carlos Moyá	**6**	2	4
6	(Chile) **Marcelo Ríos**	**7^{7}**	4	**7^{7}**
2	(United States) Jim Courier	6^{5}	**6**	6^{5}

Final
WC/1	(Austria) **Thomas Muster**	**6**	4	**6**	**6**
6	(Chile) Marcelo Ríos	3	**6**	4	1

=== Top half ===
==== Section 1 ====
First round
Q	(France) G Solvès	**7^{7}**	3	4
(Spain) **À Corretja**	6^{5}	**6**	**6**
(Russia) A Chesnokov	3	**6**	4
Q	(Spain) **V Sendín**	**6**	3	**6**
(Germany) M-K Goellner	0	2
16	(Czech Republic) **B Ulihrach**	**6**	**6**
10	(Italy) **R Furlan**	**6**	6^{3}	**6**
(Morocco) K Alami	4	**7^{7}**	3
Q	(Italy) **F Maggi**	**6**	**6**
(Italy) S Pescosolido	2	4
WC	(Spain) **F Roig**	**6**	3	**6**
(Germany) L Burgsmüller	3	**6**	3

Second round
WC/1	(Austria) **T Muster**	**6**	**6**
(Spain) À Corretja	1	3
Q	(Spain) V Sendín	0	5
16	(Czech Republic) **B Ulihrach**	**6**	**7**
10	(Italy) **R Furlan**	4	**6**	**7**
Q	(Italy) F Maggi	**6**	2	5
WC	(Spain) **F Roig**	**7^{7}**	**7^{8}**
7	(Ukraine) A Medvedev	6^{5}	6^{6}

Third round
WC/1	(Austria) **T Muster**	**6**	**7**
16	(Czech Republic) B Ulihrach	4	5
10	(Italy) R Furlan	3	2
WC	(Spain) **F Roig**	**6**	**6**

Quarterfinals
WC/1	(Austria) **T Muster**	**6**	**6**
WC	(Spain) F Roig	1	1

==== Section 2 ====
First round
(Spain) **J Burillo**	**7**	**6**
(Spain) F Clavet	5	2
Q	(Netherlands) **H J Davids**	**7**	**6**
(Italy) A Gaudenzi	5	3
(Germany) P Baur	1	1
14	(Spain) **A Berasategui**	**6**	**6**
11	(Spain) **A Costa**	**6**	**6**
(Czech Republic) C Doseděl	3	2
(Netherlands) **S Schalken**	3	**6**	**6**
(Spain) T Carbonell	**6**	1	4
WC	(Spain) J Alonso	4	1
(Spain) **C Moyá**	**6**	**6**

Second round
3	(Russia) Y Kafelnikov	**6**	1	5
(Spain) **J Burillo**	3	**6**	**7**
Q	(Netherlands) H J Davids	**7^{7}**	6^{1}	2
14	(Spain) **A Berasategui**	6^{5}	**7^{7}**	**6**
11	(Spain) **A Costa**	6^{8}	**7^{9}**	**6**
(Netherlands) S Schalken	**7^{10}**	6^{7}	3
(Spain) **C Moyá**	**6**	**6**
5	(Switzerland) M Rosset	1	4

Third round
(Spain) J Burillo	1	4
14	(Spain) **A Berasategui**	**6**	**6**
11	(Spain) A Costa	2	0	r
(Spain) **C Moyá**	**6**	**1**

Quarterfinals
14	(Spain) A Berasategui	3	3
(Spain) **C Moyá**	**6**	**6**

=== Bottom half ===
==== Section 3 ====
First round
(Spain) J Arrese	5	2
(Spain) **G Blanco**	**7**	**6**
Q	(Spain) **I Truyol**	**7**	**6**
(Hungary) S Noszály	5	2
WC	(Spain) A Martín	**6**	2	1
12	(Netherlands) **P Haarhuis**	2	**6**	**6**
13	(Spain) C Costa	1	3
(Sweden) **M Gustafsson**	**6**	**6**
(France) F Santoro	6^{4}	1
(Sweden) **M Larsson**	**7^{7}**	**6**
(Belgium) **F Dewulf**	**6**	**6**
(Czech Republic) D Rikl	4	2

Second round
6	(Chile) **M Ríos**	**6**	**6**
(Spain) G Blanco	4	3
Q	(Spain) **I Truyol**	**7^{11}**	**7**
12	(Netherlands) P Haarhuis	6^{9}	5
(Sweden) M Gustafsson	3	**6**	6^{5}
(Sweden) **M Larsson**	**6**	1	**7^{7}**
(Belgium) F Dewulf	4	3
4	(Spain) **S Bruguera**	**6**	**6**

Third round
6	(Chile) **M Ríos**	1	**6**	**6**
Q	(Spain) I Truyol	**6**	1	4
(Sweden) **M Larsson**	**6**	5	**6**
4	(Spain) S Bruguera	1	**7**	3

Quarterfinals
6	(Chile) **M Ríos**	2	**6**	**6**
(Sweden) M Larsson	**6**	1	2

==== Section 4 ====
First round
Q	(Spain) **F Vicente**	**6**	**7^{7}**
(Spain) E Sánchez	4	6^{4}
(Spain) F Mantilla	**6**	4	6^{4}
Q	(Spain) **J A Viloca**	3	**6**	**7^{7}**
(Norway) **C Ruud**	**6**	**6**
9	(Austria) G Schaller	3	2
15	(Czech Republic) **J Novák**	**6**	**6**
(Argentina) H Gumy	4	3
WC	(Spain) **R Carretero**	**6**	**6**
(Spain) J Sánchez	1	3
(Spain) **Ó Martinez**	**6**	**6**
(Slovakia) K Kučera	2	2

Second round
8	(United States) **T Martin**	**6**	**6**
Q	(Spain) F Vicente	4	1
Q	(Spain) J A Viloca	6^{3}	5
(Norway) **C Ruud**	**7^{7}**	**7**
15	(Czech Republic) J Novák	3	**6**	3
WC	(Spain) **R Carretero**	**6**	1	**6**
(Spain) Ó Martinez	4	3
2	(United States) **J Courier**	**6**	**6**

Third round
8	(United States) **T Martin**	**6**	**6**
(Norway) C Ruud	0	4
WC	(Spain) R Carretero	4	3
2	(United States) **J Courier**	**6**	**6**

Quarterfinals
8	(United States) T Martin	3	6^{4}
2	(United States) **J Courier**	**6**	**7^{7}**
