= 1993 Torneo Godó – Singles =

Singles
- 1993 Torneo Godó

Final
- Champion: (Ukraine) Andrei Medvedev
- Runner-up: (Spain) Sergi Bruguera
- Score: 6–7^{(7–9)}, 6–3, 7–5, 6–4

Details
- Draw: 56
- Seeds: 16

Events
Singles	Doubles
← 1992 ·	Torneo Godó	· 1994 →

The 1993 Torneo Godó was the forty-first edition of the Torneo Godó and it took place from April 5–12, 1993.

== Seeds ==
1. (United States) Andre Agassi (quarterfinals)
2. (United States) Ivan Lendl (quarterfinals)
3. (Germany) Michael Stich (third round)
4. (Netherlands) Richard Krajicek (quarterfinals)
5. (Spain) Carlos Costa (third round)
6. (Austria) Thomas Muster (semifinals)
7. (Spain) Sergi Bruguera (finalist)
8. (Czech Republic) Karel Nováček (third round)
9. (Ukraine) Andrei Medvedev (champion)
10. (France) Fabrice Santoro (first round)
11. (Sweden) Magnus Larsson (first round)
12. (Spain) Emilio Sánchez (second round)
13. (Spain) Jordi Arrese (third round)
14. (Spain) Francisco Clavet (second round)
15. (Sweden) Nicklas Kulti (first round)
16. (Spain) Javier Sánchez (third round)

== Draw ==
=== Key ===
- WC – Wildcard
- Q – Qualifier
- r – Retired

=== Finals ===
Quarterfinals
1	(United States) Andre Agassi	3	1
7	(Spain) Sergi Bruguera	6	6
WC	(Russia) Y. Kafelnikov	4	3
(Sweden) M. Gustafsson	6	6
6	(Austria) Thomas Muster	6	3	6
4	(Netherlands) Richard Krajicek	4	6	3
9	(Ukraine) A. Medvedev	7	6
2	(United States) Ivan Lendl	6^{5}	2

Semifinals
7	(Spain) Sergi Bruguera	6	4	6
(Sweden) M. Gustafsson	0	6	4
6	(Austria) Thomas Muster	4	3
9	(Ukraine) A. Medvedev	6	6

Finals
7	(Spain) Sergi Bruguera	7	3	5	4
9	(Ukraine) A. Medvedev	6^{7}	6	7	6

=== Earlier rounds ===
==== Section 1 ====
First round
Q	(Netherlands) Davids	6^{2}	1
(Spain) Corretja	7	6
(Switzerland) Mezzadri	7	3	4
(Spain) Altur	5	6	6
(Spain) Bersategui	4	3
16	(Spain) Sánchez	6	6
10	(France) Santoro	6^{5}	4
(Germany) Goellner	7	6
(France) Gilbert	2	r
(Argentina) Mancini	0
WC	(Spain) Burillo	6	6
(France) Champion	3	1

Second round
1	(United States) Agassi	6	6
(Spain) Corretja	2	3
(Spain) Altur	3	2
16	(Spain) Sánchez	6	6
(Germany) Goellner	4	6	5
(France) Gilbert	6	1	7
WC	(Spain) Burillo	6^{3}	2
7	(Spain) Bruguera	7	6

Third round
1	(United States) Agassi	6	7
16	(Spain) Sánchez	3	6^{2}
(France) Gilbert	4	3
7	(Spain) Bruguera	6	6

Quarterfinals
1	(United States) Agassi	3	1
7	(Spain) Bruguera	6	6

==== Section 2 ====
First round
(Russia) Olhovskiy	3	6	2
(Argentina) Markus	6	3	6
WC	(Russia) Kafelnikov	6	6	r
Q	(Czech Republic) Roubíček	4	0
(Uruguay) Filippini	5	6	5
14	(Spain) Clavet	6	5	7
11	(Sweden) Larsson	6	6^{6}	5
(Sweden) Gustafsson	4	7	7
(France) Delaître	6	3	7
WC	(Spain) Costa	3	6	5
Q	(Spain) Viloca	6	2	6
WC	(Spain) Ávila	2	6	3

Second round
3	(Germany) Stich	7	3	7
(Argentina) Markus	6^{10}	6	6^{3}
WC	(Russia) Kafelnikov	7	7
14	(Spain) Clavet	5	6^{4}
(Sweden) Gustafsson	6	6
(France) Delaître	0	3
Q	(Spain) Viloca	1	1
5	(Spain) Costa	6	6

Third round
3	(Germany) Stich	6	3	3
WC	(Russia) Kafelnikov	4	6	6
(Sweden) Gustafsson	0	6	7
5	(Spain) Costa	6	2	5

Quarterfinals
WC	(Russia) Kafelnikov	4	3
(Sweden) Gustafsson	6	6

==== Section 3 ====
First round
(Russia) Chesnokov	6	6
(Haiti) Agénor	1	4
(Italy) Furlan	3	6	6
(Argentina) Davín	6	2	0
Q	(Spain) Mancisidor	1	4
12	(Spain) Sánchez	6	6
13	(Spain) Arrese	6	4	6
(Spain) Carbonell	1	6	4
(Spain) López	2	1
WC	(Spain) Carretero	6	6
(Argentina) Azar	7	6^{2}	3
(Croatia) Prpić	6^{3}	7	6

Second round
6	(Austria) Muster	7	0	7
(Russia) Chesnokov	5	6	5
(Italy) Furlan	7	7
12	(Spain) Sánchez	5	5
13	(Spain) Arrese	2	6	6
WC	(Spain) Carretero	6	1	3
(Croatia) Prpić	4	4
4	(Netherlands) Krajicek	6	6

Third round
6	(Austria) Muster	7	6
(Italy) Furlan	5	2
13	(Spain) Arrese	4	2
4	(Netherlands) Krajicek	6	6

Quarterfinals
6	(Austria) Muster	6	3	6
4	(Netherlands) Krajicek	4	6	3

==== Section 4 ====
First round
Q	(Spain) Sánchez	1	3
(Sweden) Svensson	6	6
(Sweden) Jönsson	0	3	3
(Belgium) Wuyts	6	3	6
(Argentina) Pérez Roldán	2	0
9	(Ukraine) Medvedev	6	6
15	(Sweden) Kulti	3	2
Q	(Belgium) Dewulf	6	6
Q	(Spain) Mas	2	4
(Spain) Górriz	6	6
(Germany) Naewie	6	6^{6}	6
(Spain) Roig	4	7	2

Second round
8	(Czech Republic) Nováček	6	5	6
(Sweden) Svensson	4	7	2
(Belgium) Wuyts	1	1
9	(Ukraine) Medvedev	6	6
Q	(Belgium) Dewulf	6	6
(Spain) Górriz	4	2
(Germany) Naewie	3	3
2	(United States) Lendl	6	6

Third round
8	(Czech Republic) Nováček	5	3
9	(Ukraine) Medvedev	7	6
Q	(Belgium) Dewulf	3	1
2	(United States) Lendl	6	6

Quarterfinals
9	(Ukraine) Medvedev	7	6
2	(United States) Lendl	6^{5}	2
