= Víctor Sendín =

Spanish tennis player (born 1975)

- Full name: Víctor Sendín Huelves
- Country (sports): Spain
- Born: 1 July 1975 (age 49)
- Height: 5 ft 9 in (175 cm)
- Turned pro: 1995
- Prize money: $33,461

Singles
- Career record: 1–2
- Highest ranking: No. 242 (29 July 1996)

Grand Slam singles results
- French Open: Q1 (1996)
- Wimbledon: Q1 (1997, 1999)

Víctor Sendín Huelves (Note: In this Spanish name, the first or paternal surname is Sendín and the second or maternal family name is Huelves.) (born 1 July 1975) is a Spanish former professional tennis player.

Sendín, who turned professional in 1995, reached a career best ranking of 242 in the world. During his career he featured in the qualifying draws for both the French Open and Wimbledon Championships.

In 1996 he qualified for two ATP Tour main draws, debuting at the Barcelona Open. He had an opening round win over former top 10 player Andrei Chesnokov, before being eliminated in the second round. His other appearance came at the 1996 German Open in Hamburg.
