= 1993 Torneo Godó =

- Date: 5–11 April
- Edition: 41st
- Prize money: $750,000
- Surface: Clay / outdoor
- Location: Barcelona, Catalonia, Spain
- Venue: Real Club de Tenis Barcelona

Champions

Singles
- (Ukraine) Andrei Medvedev

Doubles
- (United States) Shelby Cannon / (United States) Scott Melville
← 1992 ·	Torneo Godó	· 1994 →

The 1993 Torneo Godó was the 41st edition of the men's Torneo Godó annual tennis tournament played on clay courts at the Real Club de Tenis Barcelona in Barcelona, Catalonia, Spain and it took place from 5 April until 11 April 1993.

This event also carried the joint denominations of the Campeonatos Internacionales de España or Spanish International Championships that was hosted at this venue and location, and was 26th edition to be held in Barcelona, also this year Renault becomes the main tournament sponsor replacing Winston and the event carries the joint denomination of Renault Open and is the 1st edition branded under that name.

== Finals ==
=== Singles ===
(Ukraine) Andrei Medvedev defeated (Spain) Sergi Bruguera, 6–7, 6–3, 7–5, 6–4

=== Doubles ===
(United States) Shelby Cannon / (United States) Scott Melville defeated (Spain) Sergio Casal / (Spain) Emilio Sánchez, 7–6, 6–1
