= 1995 Torneo Godó =

- Date: 10 – 17 April
- Edition: 43rd
- Draw: 56S/28D
- Prize money: $775,000
- Surface: Clay / outdoor
- Location: Barcelona, Spain
- Venue: Real Club de Tenis Barcelona

Champions

Singles
- (Austria) Thomas Muster

Doubles
- (United States) Trevor Kronemann / (Australia) David Macpherson
| ← 1994 · | Barcelona Open | · 1996 → |

The 1995 Torneo Godó was the 43rd edition of the Torneo Godó, a men's tennis tournament that took place on outdoor clay courts at the Real Club de Tenis Barcelona in Barcelona, Spain from 10 April through 17 April 1995. The event was part of the Championship Series of the 1995 ATP Tour. Thomas Muster won the singles title.

This event also carried the joint denominations of the Campeonatos Internacionales de España or Spanish International Championships that was hosted at this venue and location, and was 28th edition to be held in Barcelona, and the event also carries the joint denomination of Renault Open and (for sponsorships reasons) and is the 3rd edition branded under that name.

== Finals ==
=== Singles ===
(Austria) Thomas Muster defeated (Sweden) Magnus Larsson, 6–2, 6–1, 6–4

- It was Muster's 3rd singles title of the year and the 26th of his career.

=== Doubles ===
(United States) Trevor Kronemann / (Australia) David Macpherson defeated (Italy) Andrea Gaudenzi / (Croatia) Goran Ivanišević, 6–2, 6–4
