= 1991 Yugoslav Open – Singles =

Singles
- 1991 Yugoslav Open
- 1990 Champion: (Socialist Federal Republic of Yugoslavia) Goran Prpić

Final
- Champion: (Soviet Union) Dimitri Poliakov
- Runner-up: (Argentina) Javier Sanchez
- Score: 6–4, 6–4

Details
- Draw: 32 (3WC/4Q/1LL)
- Seeds: 8

Events
Singles	Doubles
- Croatia Open

Goran Prpić was the defending champion, but did not compete this year.

Dimitri Poliakov won the title by defeating Javier Sanchez 6–4, 6–4 in the final.

== Seeds ==
1. (United States) Richey Reneberg (quarterfinals)
2. (United States) Derrick Rostagno (first round)
3. (United States) David Wheaton (first round)
4. (Israel) Gilad Bloom (first round)
5. (Argentina) Francisco Clavet (quarterfinals)
6. (Spain) Javier Sanchez (final)
7. (Germany) Carl-Uwe Steeb (second round)
8. (France) Thierry Champion (first round)

== Draw ==
Key

- Q = Qualifier
- WC = Wild card
- LL = Lucky loser
- Alt = Alternate
- ITF = ITF entry
- PR = Protected ranking
- SR = Special ranking
- SE = Special exempt
- JE = Junior exempt
- JR = Junior Accelerator Programme entrant
- CO = College Accelerator Programme entrant
- NG = Next Gen Accelerator Program entrant
- w/o = Walkover
- r = Retired
- d = Defaulted

=== Finals ===
Semifinals
(Czechoslovakia) Petr Korda	6	6^{6}	5
6	(Spain) Javier Sanchez	0	7^{8}	7
Q	(Soviet Union) Dimitri Poliakov	4	6	6
(France) Jean-Philippe Fleurian	6	4	2

Final
6	(Spain) Javier Sanchez	4	4
Q	(Soviet Union) Dimitri Poliakov	6	6

=== Top half ===
First round
1	(United States) R Reneberg	2	6	6
Q	(Soviet Union) A Medvedev	6	2	3
Q	(Argentina) M Stringari	6	6
WC	(Socialist Federal Republic of Yugoslavia) E Rasberger	3	4
WC	(Italy) F Cancellotti	6	3	4
(Portugal) N Marques	3	6	6
(Czechoslovakia) P Korda	6	3	6
8	(France) T Champion	4	6	3
3	(United States) D Wheaton	4	3
(Brazil) J Oncins	6	6
Q	(Soviet Union) A Merinov	2	2
WC	(Socialist Federal Republic of Yugoslavia) B Orešar	6	6
(Finland) A Rahunen	6	3	2
(France) T Benhabiles	1	6	6
(Portugal) J Cunha-Silva	2	6	2
6	(Spain) J Sanchez	6	4	6

Second round
1	(United States) R Reneberg	5	6	6
Q	(Argentina) M Stringari	6	2	2
(Portugal) N Marques	2	1
(Czechoslovakia) P Korda	6	6
(Brazil) J Oncins	4	6	3
WC	(Socialist Federal Republic of Yugoslavia) B Orešar	6	4	6
(France) T Benhabiles	0	3
6	(Spain) J Sanchez	6	6

Quarterfinals
1	(United States) R Reneberg	5	4
(Czechoslovakia) P Korda	7	6
WC	(Socialist Federal Republic of Yugoslavia) B Orešar	2	6^{2}
6	(Spain) J Sanchez	6	7^{7}

Semifinals
(Czechoslovakia) P Korda	6	6^{6}	5
6	(Spain) J Sanchez	0	7^{8}	7

=== Bottom half ===
First round
5	(Spain) F Clavet	3	6	6
(France) G Raoux	6	1	4
(Sweden) L Jönsson	4	5
(Netherlands) J Eltingh	6	7
(Argentina) R Azar	3	6^{6}
Q	(Soviet Union) D. Poliakov	6	7^{8}
(Sweden) J Gunnarsson	7^{7}	3	7
4	(Israel) G Bloom	6^{2}	6	5
7	(Germany) CU Steeb	6	7
(Germany) M Sinner	1	5
(Germany) C Saceanu	6	4	4
(Czechoslovakia) M Vajda	4	6	6
LL	(Chile) JA Fernandez	2	5
(France) JF Fleurian	6	7
(France) R Gilbert	6	6
2	(United States) D Rostagno	0	4

Second round
5	(Spain) F Clavet	6	7^{7}
(Netherlands) J Eltingh	2	6^{5}
Q	(Soviet Union) D. Poliakov	6	6^{3}	6
(Sweden) J Gunnarsson	0	7^{7}	2
7	(Germany) CU Steeb	6	3	2
(Czechoslovakia) M Vajda	3	6	6
(France) JF Fleurian	6	6
(France) R Gilbert	3	2

Quarterfinals
5	(Spain) F Clavet	6^{3}	6	2
Q	(Soviet Union) D. Poliakov	7^{7}	2	6
(Czechoslovakia) M Vajda	3	2
(France) JF Fleurian	6	6

Semifinals
Q	(Soviet Union) D. Poliakov	4	6	6
(France) JF Fleurian	6	4	2
