= 1994 Trofeo Conde de Godó – Doubles =

Doubles
- 1994 Trofeo Conde de Godó

Final
- Champions: (Russia) Yevgeny Kafelnikov (Czech Republic) David Rikl
- Runners-up: (United States) Jim Courier (Spain) Javier Sánchez
- Score: 5–7, 6–1, 6–4

Events
Singles	Doubles
← 1993 ·	Barcelona Open	· 1995 →

Shelby Cannon and Scott Melville were the defending champions, but they lost in the second round to Ronald Agénor and Younes El Aynaoui.

Yevgeny Kafelnikov and David Rikl won the title by defeating Jim Courier and Javier Sánchez 5–7, 6–1, 6–4 in the final.

== Seeds ==
The first four seeds received a bye into the second round.

1. (Netherlands) Tom Nijssen / (Czech Republic) Cyril Suk (quarterfinals)
2. (Spain) Sergio Casal / (Spain) Emilio Sánchez (second round)
3. (United States) Luke Jensen / (Netherlands) Menno Oosting (second round)
4. (Netherlands) Hendrik Jan Davids / (South Africa) Piet Norval (second round)
5. (Germany) David Prinosil / (Germany) Udo Riglewski (quarterfinals)
6. (United States) Shelby Cannon / (United States) Scott Melville (second round)
7. (Netherlands) Mark Koevermans / (Australia) Laurie Warder (first round)
8. (United States) Mike Bauer / (South Africa) Byron Talbot (second round)

== Draw ==
=== Key ===
- Q = Qualifier
- WC = Wild card
- LL = Lucky loser
- Alt = Alternate
- ITF = ITF entry
- PR = Protected ranking
- SR = Special ranking
- SE = Special exempt
- JE = Junior exempt
- JR = Junior Accelerator Programme entrant
- CO = College Accelerator Programme entrant
- NG = Next Gen Accelerator Program entrant
- w/o = Walkover
- r = Retired
- d = Defaulted

=== Finals ===
Semifinals
(United States) Donald Johnson (United States) Francisco Montana	6	6	4
(United States) Jim Courier (Spain) Javier Sánchez	2	7	6
(Russia) Yevgeny Kafelnikov (Czech Republic) David Rikl	4	7	6
(Sweden) Jan Apell (Sweden) Peter Nyborg	6	6	4

Final
(United States) Jim Courier (Spain) Javier Sánchez	7	1	4
(Russia) Yevgeny Kafelnikov (Czech Republic) David Rikl	5	6	6

=== Top half ===
First round
Q	(Italy) A Gaudenzi (Italy) M Visconti	6	4
(Argentina) H de la Peña (Sweden) N Utgren	7	6
(United States) D Johnson (United States) F Montana	6	6	6
(Belgium) L Pimek (United States) G Van Emburgh	1	7	0
(Italy) C Brandi (Italy) F Mordegan	6	4	6
8	(United States) M Bauer (South Africa) B Talbot	3	6	7
(Australia) A Kratzmann (Australia) M Kratzmann	6	2
(United States) J Courier (Spain) J Sánchez	7	6
Q	(France) J Golmard (Spain) S Gómez Barrio	7	4	5
WC	(Haiti) R Agénor (Morocco) Y El Aynaoui	6	6	7
WC	(Spain) J Gisbert Schultze (Spain) F Roig	4	6
6	(United States) S Cannon (United States) S Melville	6	7

Second round
1	(Netherlands) T Nijssen (Czech Republic) C Suk	6	1
(Argentina) H de la Peña (Sweden) N Utgren	1	1	r
(United States) D Johnson (United States) F Montana	4	6	6
8	(United States) M Bauer (South Africa) B Talbot	6	3	4
3	(United States) L Jensen (Netherlands) M Oosting	2	7	6
(United States) J Courier (Spain) J Sánchez	6	6	7
WC	(Haiti) R Agénor (Morocco) Y El Aynaoui	7	6
6	(United States) S Cannon (United States) S Melville	5	3

Quarterfinals
1	(Netherlands) T Nijssen (Czech Republic) C Suk	4	4
(United States) D Johnson (United States) F Montana	6	6
(United States) J Courier (Spain) J Sánchez	6	7
WC	(Haiti) R Agénor (Morocco) Y El Aynaoui	3	6

Semifinals
(United States) D Johnson (United States) F Montana	6	6	4
(United States) J Courier (Spain) J Sánchez	2	7	6

=== Bottom half ===
First round
5	(Germany) D Prinosil (Germany) U Riglewski	4	6	7
(Spain) T Carbonell (Spain) C Costa	6	1	5
WC	(Spain) A Berasategui (Spain) A Costa	3	2
(Czech Republic) V Flégl (Czech Republic) K Nováček	6	6
(Portugal) J Cunha e Silva (Argentina) D Orsanic	4	6
(Russia) Y Kafelnikov (Czech Republic) D Rikl	6	7
7	(Netherlands) M Koevermans (Australia) L Warder	2	6	3
(Sweden) J Apell (Sweden) P Nyborg	6	4	6
(Latvia) Ģ Dzelde (Germany) M Huning	6	7
(United States) S DeVries (Australia) D Macpherson	2	6
WC	(Spain) J Burillo (Peru) J Yzaga	4	4
(France) O Delaître (Italy) D Nargiso	6	6

Second round
5	(Germany) D Prinosil (Germany) U Riglewski	6	6	6
(Czech Republic) V Flégl (Czech Republic) K Nováček	7	4	3
(Russia) Y Kafelnikov (Czech Republic) D Rikl	6	6
4	(Netherlands) HJ Davids (South Africa) P Norval	3	4
(Sweden) J Apell (Sweden) P Nyborg	2	6	6
(Latvia) Ģ Dzelde (Germany) M Huning	6	4	2
(France) O Delaître (Italy) D Nargiso	7	7
2	(Spain) S Casal (Spain) E Sánchez	6	6

Quarterfinals
5	(Germany) D Prinosil (Germany) U Riglewski	3	4
(Russia) Y Kafelnikov (Czech Republic) D Rikl	6	6
(Sweden) J Apell (Sweden) P Nyborg	6	6
(France) O Delaître (Italy) D Nargiso	4	4

Semifinals
(Russia) Y Kafelnikov (Czech Republic) D Rikl	4	7	6
(Sweden) J Apell (Sweden) P Nyborg	6	6	4
