= 1992 Torneo Godó =

- Date: 6–12 April
- Edition: 40th
- Category: Championship Series
- Draw: 64S / 32D
- Prize money: $660,000
- Surface: Clay / outdoor
- Location: Barcelona, Catalonia, Spain
- Venue: Real Club de Tenis Barcelona

Champions

Singles
- (Spain) Carlos Costa

Doubles
- (Ecuador) Andrés Gómez / (Spain) Javier Sánchez
← 1991 ·	Torneo Godó	· 1993 →

The 1992 Torneo Godó was the 40th edition of the Torneo Godó annual men's tennis tournament played on clay courts in Barcelona, Catalonia, Spain and part of the Championship Series of the 1992 ATP Tour. The tournament took place from 6 April through 12 April 1992, and Carlos Costa won the singles title.

This event also carried the joint denominations of the Campeonatos Internacionales de España or Spanish International Championships that was hosted at this venue and location, and was 25th edition to be held in Barcelona, and the Trofeo Winston (for sponsorship reasons) and was the 6th and final edition branded under that name.

== Finals ==
=== Singles ===
(Spain) Carlos Costa defeated (Sweden) Magnus Gustafsson 6–4, 7–6, 6–4

=== Doubles ===
(Ecuador) Andrés Gómez / (Spain) Javier Sánchez defeated (Czechoslovakia) Ivan Lendl / (Czechoslovakia) Karel Nováček 6–4, 6–4
