= 1992 Croatia Open – Singles =

Singles
- 1992 Croatia Open
- 1991 Champion: (Soviet Union) Dimitri Poliakov

Final
- Champion: (Austria) Thomas Muster
- Runner-up: (Argentina) Franco Davín
- Score: 6–1, 4–6, 6–4

Details
- Draw: 32 (3WC/4Q/1LL)
- Seeds: 8

Events
Singles	Doubles
- Croatia Open

Dimitri Poliakov was the defending champion, but did not compete this year.

Thomas Muster won the title by defeating Franco Davín 6–1, 4–6, 6–4 in the final.

== Seeds ==
1. (Austria) Thomas Muster (champion)
2. (n/a)
3. (Spain) Jordi Arrese (semifinals)
4. (Ukraine) Andrei Medvedev (quarterfinals, withdrew)
5. (Argentina) Franco Davín (final)
6. (Uruguay) Marcelo Filippini (first round)
7. (Italy) Renzo Furlan (second round)
8. (Argentina) Guillermo Pérez Roldán (quarterfinals)

== Draw ==
Key

- Q = Qualifier
- WC = Wild card
- LL = Lucky loser
- Alt = Alternate
- ITF = ITF entry
- PR = Protected ranking
- SR = Special ranking
- SE = Special exempt
- JE = Junior exempt
- JR = Junior Accelerator Programme entrant
- CO = College Accelerator Programme entrant
- NG = Next Gen Accelerator Program entrant
- w/o = Walkover
- r = Retired
- d = Defaulted

=== Finals ===
Semifinals
1	(Austria) Thomas Muster	6	6
3/WC	(Spain) Jordi Arrese	4	4
5	(Argentina) Franco Davín	2
WC	(Austria) Horst Skoff	0^{r}

Final
1	(Austria) Thomas Muster	6	4	6
5	(Argentina) Franco Davín	1	6	4

=== Top half ===
First round
1	(Austria) T Muster	6	3	6
Q	(Spain) J Gisbert Schultze	4	6	1
(Germany) D Prinosil	6	6
Q	(Spain) A Berasategui	2	2
(Germany) P Baur	6	6
(Sweden) L Jönsson	3	4
(Argentina) R Azar	3	6^{4}
8	(Argentina) G Pérez Roldán	6	7^{7}
3/WC	(Spain) J Arrese	6	6
(Czechoslovakia) M Střelba	4	3
Q	(United States) B Devening	6	4	6
(Italy) M Cierro	3	6	3
(Belgium) B Wuyts	6	6
Q	(Italy) M Visconti	3	2
(Spain) JF Altur	6	7
6	(Uruguay) M Filippini	1	5

Second round
1	(Austria) T Muster	6	6
(Germany) D Prinosil	1	0
(Germany) P Baur	6^{7}	6	5
8	(Argentina) G Pérez Roldán	7^{9}	2	7
3/WC	(Spain) J Arrese	7	7
Q	(United States) B Devening	5	5
(Belgium) B Wuyts	1	3
(Spain) JF Altur	6	6

Quarterfinals
1	(Austria) T Muster	7	6
8	(Argentina) G Pérez Roldán	5	0
3/WC	(Spain) J Arrese	6	6
(Spain) JF Altur	4	2

Semifinals
1	(Austria) T Muster	6	6
3/WC	(Spain) J Arrese	4	4

=== Bottom half ===
First round
5	(Argentina) F Davín	6	6
(Germany) M Zillner	1	2
(Ecuador) R Viver	3	7^{7}	2
(Spain) À Corretja	6	6^{2}	6
(France) F Fontang	6	6
(Germany) L Koslowski	2	4
(Germany) MK Goellner	2	6	4
4/WC	(Ukraine) A Medvedev	6	3	6
7	(Italy) R Furlan	5	6	6
(Czechoslovakia) D Rikl	7	0	0
WC	(Austria) H Skoff	4	6	6
(Argentina) H de la Peña	6	4	1
(France) O Soules	3	4
(Switzerland) C Mezzadri	6	6
(Spain) M Górriz	6	3
LL	(Italy) M Ardinghi	0	2^{r}

Second round
5	(Argentina) F Davín	6	6
(Spain) À Corretja	4	4
(France) F Fontang	4	1
4/WC	(Ukraine) A Medvedev	6	6
7	(Italy) R Furlan	2	3
WC	(Austria) H Skoff	6	6
(Switzerland) C Mezzadri	6^{4}	6	7
(Spain) M Górriz	7^{7}	4	5

Quarterfinals
5	(Argentina) F Davín	w/o
4/WC	(Ukraine) A Medvedev
WC	(Austria) H Skoff	6	6
(Switzerland) C Mezzadri	4	4

Semifinals
5	(Argentina) F Davín	2
WC	(Austria) H Skoff	0^{r}
