= 1996 Trofeo Conde de Godó – Doubles =

Doubles
- 1996 Trofeo Conde de Godó

Final
- Champions: (Argentina) Luis Lobo (Spain) Javier Sánchez
- Runners-up: (United Kingdom) Neil Broad (South Africa) Piet Norval
- Score: 6–1, 6–3

Details
- Draw: 28
- Seeds: 8

Events
| Singles | Doubles |
- Trofeo Conde de Godó

Trevor Kronemann and David Macpherson were the defending champions but lost in the quarterfinals to Luis Lobo and Javier Sánchez.

Lobo and Sánchez won in the final 6–1, 6–3 against Neil Broad and Piet Norval.

== Seeds ==
Champion seeds are indicated in bold text while text in italics indicates the round in which those seeds were eliminated. The top four seeded teams received byes into the second round.

1. (Netherlands) Paul Haarhuis / (Russia) Yevgeny Kafelnikov (second round)
2. (Canada) Grant Connell / (United States) Todd Martin (quarterfinals)
3. (Netherlands) Menno Oosting / (Czech Republic) Cyril Suk (second round)
4. (Argentina) **Luis Lobo** / (Spain) **Javier Sánchez (champions)**
5. (South Africa) Ellis Ferreira / (United States) Mark Keil (second round)
6. (United States) Trevor Kronemann / (Australia) David Macpherson (quarterfinals)
7. (Belgium) Libor Pimek / (South Africa) Byron Talbot (first round)
8. (Czech Republic) Jiří Novák / (Czech Republic) David Rikl (second round)

== Draw ==
Key

- Q = Qualifier
- WC = Wild card
- LL = Lucky loser
- Alt = Alternate
- ITF = ITF entry
- PR = Protected ranking
- SR = Special ranking
- SE = Special exempt
- JE = Junior exempt
- JR = Junior Accelerator Programme entrant
- CO = College Accelerator Programme entrant
- NG = Next Gen Accelerator Program entrant
- w/o = Walkover
- r = Retired
- d = Defaulted

=== Final ===
Final

- (United Kingdom) Neil Broad
- (South Africa) Piet Norval
1
3

4
- (Argentina) **Luis Lobo**
- (Spain) **Javier Sánchez**
**6**
**6**

=== Top half ===
First round

Second round

Quarterfinals

Semifinals

1
- (Netherlands) P Haarhuis
- (Russia) Y Kafelnikov
3
**6**
4

- (United Kingdom) **N Broad**
- (South Africa) **P Norval**
**7**
**6**

- (United Kingdom) **N Broad**
- (South Africa) **P Norval**
**6**
1
**6**

Q
- (Brazil) G Kuerten
- (Italy) F Maggi
5
1

- (United Kingdom) **N Broad**
- (South Africa) **P Norval**
**6**
4
**6**

- (Italy) **R Furlan**
- (Italy) **S Pescosolido**
**6**
**6**

- (Italy) R Furlan
- (Italy) S Pescosolido
2
**6**
2

Q
- (Spain) E Benfele Álvarez
- (Spain) J Imaz
1
2

- (Italy) **R Furlan**
- (Italy) **S Pescosolido**
**6**
**6**

- (Spain) **J Arrese**
- (Netherlands) **S Noteboom**
3
**6**
**6**

- (Spain) J Arrese
- (Netherlands) S Noteboom
1
1

7
- (Belgium) L Pimek
- (South Africa) B Talbot
**6**
4
1

- (United Kingdom) **N Broad**
- (South Africa) **P Norval**
**6**
**6**

- (Spain) T Carbonell
- (Spain) F Roig
2
3

3
- (Netherlands) M Oosting
- (Czech Republic) C Suk
4
4

WC
- (Spain) A Costa
- (Spain) C Moyá
4
1

WC
- (Spain) **C Costa**
- (Spain) **E Sánchez**
**6**
**6**

WC
- (Spain) **C Costa**
- (Spain) **E Sánchez**
**6**
**6**

WC
- (Spain) C Costa
- (Spain) E Sánchez
5
**6**
4

- (Austria) A Antonitsch
- (Australia) J Ireland
2
4

- (Spain) **T Carbonell**
- (Spain) **F Roig**
**7**
3
**6**

- (Spain) **T Carbonell**
- (Spain) **F Roig**
**6**
**6**

- (Spain) **T Carbonell**
- (Spain) **F Roig**
6
**7**
**7**

- (Netherlands) T Kempers
- (Netherlands) S Schalken
4
**6**
3

5
- (South Africa) E Ferreira
- (United States) M Keil
**7**
6
6

5
- (South Africa) **E Ferreira**
- (United States) **M Keil**
**6**
2
**6**

=== Bottom half ===
First round

Second round

Quarterfinals

Semifinals

6
- (United States) **T Kronemann**
- (Australia) **D Macpherson**
**6**
**6**

- (Czech Republic) P Pála
- (Czech Republic) P Vízner
3
4

6
- (United States) **T Kronemann**
- (Australia) **D Macpherson**
**6**
**6**

WC
- (Ukraine) **A Medvedev**
- (Switzerland) **M Rosset**
**7**
**6**

WC
- (Ukraine) A Medvedev
- (Switzerland) M Rosset
3
4

- (Netherlands) T Nijssen
- (United States) G Van Emburgh
5
0

6
- (United States) T Kronemann
- (Australia) D Macpherson
**6**
4
4

- (South Africa) **J-L de Jager**
- (Sweden) **M Larsson**
**6**
6
**7**

4
- (Argentina) **L Lobo**
- (Spain) **J Sánchez**
2
**6**
**6**

- (United States) D Johnson
- (United States) F Montana
4
**7**
6

- (South Africa) J-L de Jager
- (Sweden) M Larsson
3
4

4
- (Argentina) **L Lobo**
- (Spain) **J Sánchez**
**6**
**6**

4
- (Argentina) **L Lobo**
- (Spain) **J Sánchez**
**6**
4
**6**

8
- (Czech Republic) **J Novák**
- (Czech Republic) **D Rikl**
**6**
**6**

- (United States) J Courier
- (Italy) A Gaudenzi
3
**6**
2

- (Hungary) L Markovits
- (France) F Santoro
3
4

8
- (Czech Republic) J Novák
- (Czech Republic) D Rikl
5
3

- (United States) **J Courier**
- (Italy) **A Gaudenzi**
**6**
**6**

- (United States) **J Courier**
- (Italy) **A Gaudenzi**
**7**
**6**

WC
- (Spain) A Berasategui
- (Spain) J Burillo
4
3

- (United States) **J Courier**
- (Italy) **A Gaudenzi**
**6**
**7**

- (Spain) J A Conde
- (Spain) À Corretja
3
**7**
4

2
- (Canada) G Connell
- (United States) T Martin
4
6

- (South Africa) **D Adams**
- (South Africa) **M Barnard**
**6**
6
**6**

- (South Africa) D Adams
- (South Africa) M Barnard
5
3

2
- (Canada) **G Connell**
- (United States) **T Martin**
**7**
**6**
