= 1992 Croatia Open =

- Date: 24–30 August
- Edition: 3rd
- Category: World Series
- Draw: 32S / 16D
- Prize money: $235,000
- Surface: Clay / outdoor
- Location: Umag, Croatia

Champions

Singles
- (Austria) Thomas Muster

Doubles
- (Germany) David Prinosil / (Czechoslovakia) Richard Vogel
← 1991 ·	Croatia Open	· 1993 →

The 1992 Croatia Open was a men's tennis tournament played on outdoor clay courts in Umag, Croatia that was part of the World Series of the 1992 ATP Tour. It was the third edition of the tournament and was held from 24 August until 30 August 1992. First-seeded Thomas Muster won the singles title.

== Finals ==
=== Singles ===
(Austria) Thomas Muster defeated (Argentina) Franco Davín, 6–1, 4–6, 6–4

- It was Muster's 3rd singles title of the year and the 13th of his career.

=== Doubles ===
(Germany) David Prinosil / (Czechoslovakia) Richard Vogel defeated (Netherlands) Sander Groen / (Germany) Lars Koslowski, 6–3, 6–7, 7–6
