= 1996 Trofeo Conde de Godó =

- Date: 15–21 April
- Edition: 44th
- Category: Championship Series
- Draw: 56S / 28D
- Prize money: $800,000
- Surface: Clay / outdoor
- Location: Barcelona, Spain
- Venue: Real Club de Tenis Barcelona

Champions

Singles
- (Austria) Thomas Muster

Doubles
- (Argentina) Luis Lobo / (Spain) Javier Sánchez
← 1995 ·	Trofeo Conde de Godó	· 1997 →

The 1996 Trofeo Conde de Godó was a men's tennis tournament played on outdoor clay courts at the Real Club de Tenis Barcelona in Barcelona in Spain and was part of the Championship Series of the 1996 ATP Tour. The tournament was held from 15 April through 21 April 1996. Thomas Muster won the singles title.

This event also carried the joint denominations of the Campeonatos Internacionales de España or Spanish International Championships that was hosted at this venue and location, and was 29th edition to be held in Barcelona, also this year SEAT replaces Renault as the main tournament sponsor and the Open Seat Godó' and is the 1st edition branded under that name.

== Finals ==
=== Singles ===
(Austria) Thomas Muster defeated (Chile) Marcelo Ríos 6–3, 4–6, 6–4, 6–1

- It was Muster's 3rd title of the year and the 39th of his career.

=== Doubles ===
(Argentina) Luis Lobo / (Spain) Javier Sánchez defeated (United Kingdom) Neil Broad / (South Africa) Piet Norval 6–1, 6–3

- It was Lobo's 1st title of the year and the 4th of his career. It was Sánchez's 1st title of the year and the 23rd of his career.
