= 1994 Trofeo Conde de Godó =

- Date: 2–10 April
- Edition: 42nd
- Category: Championship Series
- Draw: 56S / 28D
- Prize money: $775,000
- Surface: Clay / outdoor
- Location: Barcelona, Catalonia, Spain
- Venue: Real Club de Tenis Barcelona

Champions

Singles
- (Netherlands) Richard Krajicek

Doubles
- (Russia) Yevgeny Kafelnikov / (Czech Republic) David Rikl
← 1993 ·	Trofeo Conde de Godó	· 1995 →

The 1994 Torneo Godó was the 42nd edition of the Torneo Godó annual men's tennis tournament played on outdoor clay courts in Barcelona, Catalonia, Spain] The tournament was part of the Championship Series of the 1994 ATP Tour and it took place from 2 April until 10 April 1994. Seventh-seeded Richard Krajicek won the singles title.

This event also carried the joint denominations of the Campeonatos Internacionales de España or Spanish International Championships that was hosted at this venue and location, and was 27th edition to be held in Barcelona, and the event also carries the joint denomination of Renault Open and (for sponsorships reasons) and is the 2nd edition branded under that name.

== Finals ==
=== Singles ===
(Netherlands) Richard Krajicek defeated (Spain) Carlos Costa 6–4, 7–6, 6–2

- It was Krajicek's 1st singles title of the year and the 5th of his career.

=== Doubles ===
(Russia) Yevgeny Kafelnikov / (Czech Republic) David Rikl defeated (United States) Jim Courier / (Spain) Javier Sánchez 5–7, 6–1, 6–4
