= 1990 Yugoslav Open =

Men's tennis tournament in Umag, Croatia

- Date: 14–20 May
- Edition: 1st
- Category: World Series
- Draw: 32S / 16D
- Prize money: $175,000
- Surface: Clay / outdoor
- Location: Umag, Yugoslavia (current Croatia)

Champions

Singles
- (Croatia) Goran Prpić

Doubles
- (Czechoslovakia) Vojtěch Flégl / (Czechoslovakia) Daniel Vacek
- Croatia Open

The 1990 Yugoslav Open was a men's tennis tournament played on outdoor clay courts in Umag, Yugoslavia that was part of the World Series (Designated Week) of the 1990 ATP Tour. It was the first edition of the tournament and was held from 14 May until 20 May 1990. First-seeded Goran Prpić won the singles title.

== Finals ==
=== Singles ===
(Socialist Federal Republic of Yugoslavia) Goran Prpić defeated (Socialist Federal Republic of Yugoslavia) Goran Ivanišević, 6–3, 4–6, 6-4

- It was Prpić's only ATP singles title of his career.

=== Doubles ===
(Czechoslovakia) Vojtěch Flégl / (Czechoslovakia) Daniel Vacek defeated (Soviet Union) Andrei Cherkasov / (Soviet Union) Andrei Olhovskiy, 6–4, 6–4

- It was Flégl's first doubles title of his career. It was Vacek's first doubles title of his career.
