= 1992 Torneo Godó – Doubles =

Doubles
- 1992 Torneo Godó

Final
- Champions: (Ecuador) Andrés Gómez (Spain) Javier Sánchez
- Runners-up: (Czechoslovakia) Ivan Lendl (Czechoslovakia) Karel Nováček
- Score: 6–4, 6–4

Details
- Draw: 28
- Seeds: 8

Events
Singles	Doubles
- Barcelona Open

Horacio de la Peña and Diego Nargiso were the defending champions, but Nargiso did not compete this year. De la Peña teamed up with Boris Becker and lost in the first round to Marcos Górriz and Jan Gunnarsson.

Andrés Gómez and Javier Sánchez won the title by defeating Ivan Lendl and Karel Nováček 6–4, 6–4 in the final.

== Seeds ==
The first four seeds received a bye into the second round.

1. (United States) Luke Jensen / (Australia) Laurie Warder (first round)
2. (Netherlands) Tom Nijssen / (Czechoslovakia) Cyril Suk (quarterfinals)
3. (Spain) Sergio Casal / (Spain) Emilio Sánchez (semifinals)
4. (United States) Steve DeVries / (Australia) David Macpherson (second round)
5. (United States) Patrick Galbraith / (United States) Scott Melville (second round)
6. (Sweden) Ronnie Båthman / (Sweden) Rikard Bergh (quarterfinals)
7. (n/a)
8. (Netherlands) Mark Koevermans / (Germany) Udo Riglewski (first round)

== Draw ==
Key

- Q = Qualifier
- WC = Wild card
- LL = Lucky loser
- Alt = Alternate
- ITF = ITF entry
- PR = Protected ranking
- SR = Special ranking
- SE = Special exempt
- JE = Junior exempt
- JR = Junior Accelerator Programme entrant
- CO = College Accelerator Programme entrant
- NG = Next Gen Accelerator Program entrant
- w/o = Walkover
- r = Retired
- d = Defaulted

=== Finals ===
Semifinals
(United States) Francisco Montana (Finland) Olli Rahnasto	3	5
(Ecuador) Andrés Gómez (Spain) Javier Sánchez	6	7
3	(Spain) Sergio Casal (Spain) Emilio Sánchez	6	2
WC	(Czechoslovakia) Ivan Lendl (Czechoslovakia) Karel Nováček	7	6

Final
(Ecuador) Andrés Gómez (Spain) Javier Sánchez	6	6
WC	(Czechoslovakia) Ivan Lendl (Czechoslovakia) Karel Nováček	4	4

=== Top half ===
First round
Q	(Spain) JF Altur (Uruguay) M Filippini	3	3
(United States) F Montana (Finland) O Rahnasto	6	6
(Argentina) G Luza (Argentina) C Miniussi	4	0
(Netherlands) J Eltingh (Netherlands) T Kempers	6	6
WC	(Spain) C Costa (Spain) F Clavet	3	6	6
LL	(Czechoslovakia) R Vogel (Czechoslovakia) T Anzari	6	2	3
(Spain) A Berasategui (Spain) À Corretja	6	6	3
(Ecuador) A Gómez (Spain) J Sánchez	7	3	6
(Spain) T Carbonell (Spain) F Roig	3	6	6
(Mexico) J Lozano (Uruguay) D Pérez	6	2	3
Q	(Italy) R Furlan (Croatia) G Prpić	2	4
6	(Sweden) R Båthman (Sweden) R Bergh	6	6

Second round
1	(United States) L Jensen (Australia) L Warder	6	5
(United States) F Montana (Finland) O Rahnasto	7	7
(Netherlands) J Eltingh (Netherlands) T Kempers	6	6	7
WC	(Spain) C Costa (Spain) F Clavet	7	3	5
4	(United States) S DeVries (Australia) D Macpherson	1	4
(Ecuador) A Gómez (Spain) J Sánchez	6	6
(Spain) T Carbonell (Spain) F Roig	3	6
6	(Sweden) R Båthman (Sweden) R Bergh	6	7

Quarterfinals
(United States) F Montana (Finland) O Rahnasto	6	2	7
(Netherlands) J Eltingh (Netherlands) T Kempers	3	6	6
(Ecuador) A Gómez (Spain) J Sánchez	7	6
6	(Sweden) R Båthman (Sweden) R Bergh	5	3

Semifinals
(United States) F Montana (Finland) O Rahnasto	3	5
(Ecuador) A Gómez (Spain) J Sánchez	6	7

=== Bottom half ===
First round
5	(United States) P Galbraith (United States) S Melville	6	6
WC	(Argentina) M Jaite (Spain) G López	4	3
(United States) C Beckman (United States) J Brown	6	6
(Czechoslovakia) V Flégl (Netherlands) M Oosting	4	4
(Latvia) Ģ Dzelde (Sweden) O Jonsson	3	6
(South Africa) D Adams (Russia) A Olhovskiy	6	7
8	(Netherlands) M Koevermans (Germany) U Riglewski	1	6	3
WC	(Czechoslovakia) I Lendl (Czechoslovakia) K Nováček	6	3	6
(Brazil) R Acioly (Spain) JC Báguena	2	6	3
(United States) S Cannon (United States) G Van Emburgh	6	3	6
(Spain) M Górriz (Sweden) J Gunnarsson	7	7
(Germany) B Becker (Argentina) H de la Peña	5	5

Second round
5	(United States) P Galbraith (United States) S Melville	2	4
(United States) C Beckman (United States) J Brown	6	6
(South Africa) D Adams (Russia) A Olhovskiy	3	4
3	(Spain) S Casal (Spain) E Sánchez	6	6
WC	(Czechoslovakia) I Lendl (Czechoslovakia) K Nováček	6	2	6
(United States) S Cannon (United States) G Van Emburgh	1	6	4
(Spain) M Górriz (Sweden) J Gunnarsson	1	4
2	(Netherlands) T Nijssen (Czechoslovakia) C Suk	6	6

Quarterfinals
(United States) C Beckman (United States) J Brown	3	1
3	(Spain) S Casal (Spain) E Sánchez	6	6
WC	(Czechoslovakia) I Lendl (Czechoslovakia) K Nováček	7	6
2	(Netherlands) T Nijssen (Czechoslovakia) C Suk	6	3

Semifinals
3	(Spain) S Casal (Spain) E Sánchez	6	2
WC	(Czechoslovakia) I Lendl (Czechoslovakia) K Nováček	7	6
