= Fabio Maggi =

Spanish-born Italian tennis player

- Full name: Fabio Maggi
- Country (sports): Italy
- Born: 30 January 1975 (age 51) Madrid, Spain
- Prize money: $91,039

Singles
- Career record: 2–4
- Career titles: 0
- Highest ranking: No. 202 (22 April 1996)

Doubles
- Career record: 1–7
- Career titles: 0
- Highest ranking: No. 169 (8 September 1997)

Fabio Maggi (Italian pronunciation: [ˈfaːbjo ˈmaddʒi]; born 30 January 1975) is a former professional tennis player from Italy.

== Biography ==
Originally from Spain, Maggi began playing tennis aged seven.

Maggi, who was coached by Jordi Vilaro, turned professional in 1995. On the ATP Tour, he had main draw wins over top 100 players Kris Goossens and Stefano Pescosolido during his career. His only Challenger title came at Alpirsbach in 1997, over Stefan Koubek.

He retired from professional tennis in 2001 and has since been head of a tennis academy in Cunit, Spain.

== Challenger titles ==
=== Singles: (1) ===
No.	Year	Tournament	Surface	Opponent	Score
1.	1997	Alpirsbach, Germany	Clay	(Austria) Stefan Koubek	6–4, 5–7, 6–4
