= 1991 Torneo Godó =

- Date: 8–14 April
- Edition: 39th
- Draw: 64S / 32D
- Prize money: $510,000
- Surface: Clay / outdoor
- Location: Barcelona, Catalonia, Spain
- Venue: Real Club de Tenis Barcelona

Champions

Singles
- (Spain) Emilio Sánchez

Doubles
- (Argentina) Horacio de la Peña / (Italy) Diego Nargiso
← 1990 ·	Torneo Godó	· 1992 →

The 1991 Torneo Godó was the 39th edition of the Torneo Godó annual men's tennis tournament played on clay courts in outdoor Barcelona, Catalonia, Spain and part of the Championship Series of the 1991 ATP Tour. It was the 39th edition of the tournament took place from 8 April through 14 April 1991. Seventh-seeded Emilio Sánchez won the singles title.

This event also carried the joint denominations of the Campeonatos Internacionales de España or Spanish International Championships that was hosted at this venue and location, and was 24th edition to be held in Barcelona, and the Trofeo Winston (for sponsorship reasons) and was the 5th edition branded under that name.

== Finals ==
=== Singles ===
(Spain) Emilio Sánchez defeated (Spain) Sergi Bruguera 6–4, 7–6^{(9–7)}, 6–2

=== Doubles ===
(Argentina) Horacio de la Peña / (Italy) Diego Nargiso defeated (Germany) Boris Becker / (Germany) Eric Jelen 3–6, 7–6, 6–4
