= 1990 Torneo Godó =

- Date: 9–15 April
- Edition: 38th
- Category: Championship Series
- Draw: 64S / 32D
- Prize money: $375,000
- Surface: Clay / outdoor
- Location: Barcelona, Catalonia, Spain
- Venue: Real Club de Tenis Barcelona

Champions

Singles
- (Ecuador) Andrés Gómez

Doubles
- (Ecuador) Andrés Gómez / (Spain) Javier Sánchez
← 1989 ·	Torneo Godó	· 1991 →

The 1990 Torneo Godó was the 38th edition of the Torneo Godó annual men's tennis tournament played on clay courts in Barcelona, Spain and part of the Championship Series of the 1990 ATP Tour. It was the 38th edition of the tournament and took place from 9 April until 15 April 1990, and fourth-seeded Andrés Gómez won the singles title.

This event also carried the joint denominations of the Campeonatos Internacionales de España or Spanish International Championships that was hosted at this venue and location, and was 23rd edition to be held in Barcelona, and the Trofeo Winston Super Series and was the 4th edition branded under that name.

== Finals ==
=== Singles ===
(Ecuador) Andrés Gómez defeated (Argentina) Guillermo Pérez Roldán 6–0, 7–6, 3–6, 0–6, 6–2

=== Doubles ===
(Ecuador) Andrés Gómez / (Spain) Javier Sánchez defeated (Spain) Sergio Casal / (Spain) Emilio Sánchez 7–6, 7–5
