= José Luis Aparisi =

Spanish tennis player (born 1969)

- Full name: José Luis Aparisi
- Country (sports): Spain
- Born: 11 March 1969 (age 56); Valencia, Spain
- Plays: Right-handed
- Prize money: $84,641

Singles
- Career record: 3–9
- Career titles: 0
- Highest ranking: No. 142 (11 September 1989)

Doubles
- Career record: 7–10
- Career titles: 0
- Highest ranking: No. 129 (20 May 1991)

Grand Slam doubles results
- French Open: 1R (1991)

José Luis Aparisi (born 11 March 1969) is a former professional tennis player from Spain.

== Biography ==
A right-handed player from Valencia, Aparisi was the Spanish champion in the under-16s age group. He had his best year as a junior in 1987 when he made the doubles semi-finals of the Orange Bowl with Vicente Solves, represented Spain at the Sunshine Cup and appeared in the boys' singles at both the French Open and Wimbledon Championships.

Aparisi started his career on the Grand Prix circuit in 1988. All three of his wins at this level came at the 1989 San Marino Open. He beat Thomas Haldin, Cristiano Caratti and Renzo Furlan, before his run was ended by Roberto Azar. At the same tournament he made the semi-finals of the doubles, with José Francisco Altur.

As a doubles player he won one Challenger title but had his most noted performances when partnering Vicente Solves in 1991. The pair made the semi-finals at Barcelona as qualifiers and featured in the main draw of the French Open.

Aparisi has worked for many years as a coach since retiring. Players he has coached include Pablo Andújar, Guillermo García López, David Sánchez and Cristina Torrens Valero.

== Challenger titles ==
=== Doubles: (1) ===
No.	Year	Tournament	Surface	Partner	Opponents	Score
1.	1990	Lins, Brazil	Clay	(Spain) José Clavet	(Argentina) Javier Frana (Mexico) Agustín Moreno	7–6, 6–3
