= Damir Buljević =

Croatian tennis player

- Country (sports): Yugoslavia; Croatia
- Born: 22 September 1965 (age 59); Split, Croatia
- Height: 6 ft 5 in (196 cm)
- Plays: Right-handed

Singles
- Career record: 1–3
- Highest ranking: No. 204 (29 Feb 1988)

Doubles
- Career record: 0–1
- Highest ranking: No. 551 (26 Nov 1984)

Damir Buljević (born 22 September 1965) is a Croatian former professional tennis player of the 1980s and 1990s. He is a dual German-Croatian citizen.

Born in Split, Buljević moved to Germany due to the war and has remained there since. During his career he was a Davis Cup squad member for both the Yugoslav and Croatian national teams. He was a semi-finalist at the 1988 Heilbronn Challenger and in 1990 made the second round at the ATP Tour's Umag Open, where he fell to Eric Jelen in a third set tiebreak. In 1992 he won Germany's national outdoor championships.
