= Vicente Solves =

Spanish tennis player (born 1969)

- Full name: Vicente Solves
- Country (sports): Spain
- Born: 8 February 1969 (age 56); Valencia, Spain
- Plays: Right-handed
- Prize money: $66,473

Singles
- Career record: 0–4
- Career titles: 0
- Highest ranking: No. 223 (20 August 1990)

Doubles
- Career record: 10–19
- Career titles: 0
- Highest ranking: No. 147 (20 May 1991)

Grand Slam doubles results
- French Open: 1R (1991)

Vicente Solves (born 8 February 1969) is a former professional tennis player from Spain.

== Biography ==
A right-handed player from Valencia, Solves started playing tennis at the age of eight. He was a highly ranked junior in Spain and made the doubles semi-finals with José Luis Aparisi at the Orange Bowl in 1987.

Solves partnered with juniors partner Aparisi in his only Grand Slam main draw appearance, at the 1991 French Open, where the pair were eliminated in the first round of the men's doubles, by Cássio Motta and Gustavo Luza.

On the ATP Tour he was most successful as a doubles player. He made the semi-finals of three tournaments, the 1991 Campionati Internazionali di Sicilia in Palermo, the 1991 Torneo Godó in Barcelona and the 1992 Saab International in Athens.

== Challenger titles ==
=== Doubles: (1) ===
No.	Year	Tournament	Surface	Partner	Opponents	Score
1.	1990	Gramado, Brazil	Clay	(Brazil) Ivan Kley	(Argentina) Eduardo Bengoechea (Argentina) Pablo Albano	6–3, 7–5
