= 1994 Campionati Internazionali di San Marino =

- Date: 8–14 August
- Edition: 6th
- Category: World Series
- Draw: 32S / 16D
- Prize money: $275,000
- Surface: Clay / outdoor
- Location: City of San Marino, San Marino

Champions

Singles
- (Spain) Carlos Costa

Doubles
- (United Kingdom) Neil Broad / (United States) Greg Van Emburgh
← 1993 ·	Campionati Internazionali di San Marino	· 1995 →

The 1994 Campionati Internazionali di San Marino was a men's tennis tournament played on outdoor clay courts at the Centro Tennis Cassa di Risparmio di Fonte dell'Ovo in the City of San Marino in San Marino and was part of the World Series of the 1994 ATP Tour. It was the sixth edition of the tournament and was held from 8 August until 14 August 1994. Second-seeded Carlos Costa, who entered the main draw on a wildcard, won the singles title.

== Finals ==
=== Singles ===
(Spain) Carlos Costa defeated (Germany) Oliver Gross 6–1, 6–3

- It was Costa's 2nd title of the year and the 6th and last of his career.

=== Doubles ===
(United Kingdom) Neil Broad / (United States) Greg Van Emburgh defeated (Spain) Jordi Arrese / (Italy) Renzo Furlan 6–4, 7–6
