= 1994 ATP Tour =

Men's tennis circuit

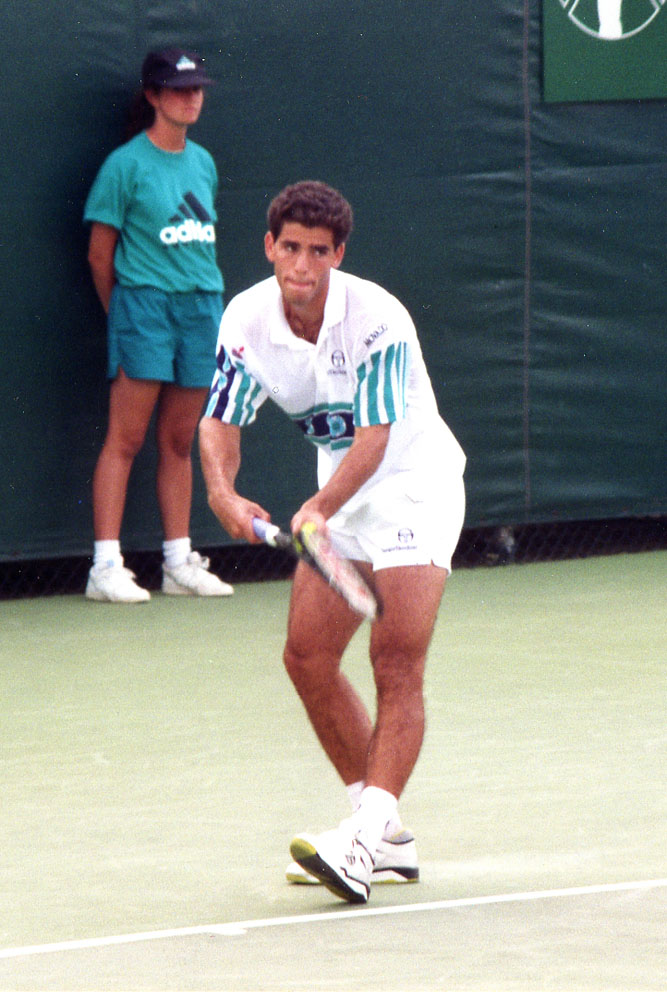
- Pete Sampras finished the year ranked world No. 1 for the second time in his career. He won ten titles during the season, including two majors at the Australian Open and the Wimbledon Championships, as well as the ATP Tour World Championships. He also won three ATP Championship Series, Single Week events.

Details
- Duration: 3 January 1994 – 28 November 1994
- Edition: 5th
- Categories: Grand Slam (4); ATP Tour World Championships; ATP Championship Series, Single-Week (9); ATP Championship Series (12); ATP World Series (63); Team Events (2)

Achievements (singles)
- Most titles: (United States) Pete Sampras (10)
- Most finals: (United States) Pete Sampras (11)
- Prize money leader: (United States) Pete Sampras ($4,855,012)
- Points leader: (United States) Pete Sampras (5097)

Awards
- Player of the year: (United States) Pete Sampras
- Doubles team of the year: (Netherlands) Jacco Eltingh; (Netherlands) Paul Haarhuis
- Most improved player of the year: (Russia) Yevgeny Kafelnikov
- Newcomer of the year: (Spain) Albert Costa
- Comeback player of the year: (France) Guy Forget

The Association of Tennis Professionals (ATP) Tour is the elite tour for professional tennis organized by the ATP. The ATP Tour includes the Grand Slam tournaments (organized by the International Tennis Federation (ITF)), the ATP Championship Series, Single-Week, the ATP Championship Series, the ATP World Series, the ATP World Team Cup, the Davis Cup (organized by the ITF), the ATP Tour World Championships and the Grand Slam Cup (organized by the ITF).

== Schedule ==
This is the complete schedule of events on the 1994 IBM ATP Tour, with player progression documented from the quarterfinals stage.

Key

Grand Slam
ATP Tour World Championships
ATP Championship Series, Single-Week
ATP Championship Series
ATP World Series
Team Events

=== January ===
Week	Tournament	Champions	Runners-up	Semifinalists	Quarterfinalists
3 Jan	Hopman Cup; Perth, Australia; ITF Mixed Team Championships; Hard (i) – 8 teams (RR)	Czech Republic; 2–1	Germany	Australia; Austria	Switzerland; France; Spain; United States
3 Jan	Pure Milk Australian Men's; Hardcourt Championships; Adelaide, Australia; ATP World Series; Hard – $288,750 – 32S/16D; Singles – Doubles	(Russia) Yevgeny Kafelnikov; 6–4, 6–3	(Russia) Alexander Volkov	(Australia) Patrick Rafter (Sweden) Nicklas Kulti	(South Africa) Grant Stafford (Czech Republic) David Rikl (Denmark) Kenneth Carlsen (France) Guillaume Raoux
3 Jan	Pure Milk Australian Men's; Hardcourt Championships; Adelaide, Australia; ATP World Series; Hard – $288,750 – 32S/16D; Singles – Doubles	(Australia) Mark Kratzmann (Australia) Andrew Kratzmann; 6–4, 7–5	(South Africa) David Adams (Zimbabwe) Byron Black	(Australia) Patrick Rafter (Sweden) Nicklas Kulti	(South Africa) Grant Stafford (Czech Republic) David Rikl (Denmark) Kenneth Carlsen (France) Guillaume Raoux
3 Jan	Qatar Open; Doha, Qatar; ATP World Series; Hard – $500,000 – 32S/16D; Singles – Doubles	(Sweden) Stefan Edberg; 6–3, 6–2	(Netherlands) Paul Haarhuis	(Croatia) Goran Ivanišević (Austria) Gilbert Schaller	(Russia) Andrei Olhovskiy (Italy) Stefano Pescosolido (France) Henri Leconte (Haiti) Ronald Agénor
3 Jan	Qatar Open; Doha, Qatar; ATP World Series; Hard – $500,000 – 32S/16D; Singles – Doubles	(France) Olivier Delaître (France) Stéphane Simian; 6–3, 6–3	(United States) Shelby Cannon (South Africa) Byron Talbot	(Croatia) Goran Ivanišević (Austria) Gilbert Schaller	(Russia) Andrei Olhovskiy (Italy) Stefano Pescosolido (France) Henri Leconte (Haiti) Ronald Agénor
3 Jan	Oahu Open; Oahu, HI, United States; ATP World Series; Hard – $288,750 – 32S/16D; Singles – Doubles	(South Africa) Wayne Ferreira; 6–4, 6–7^{(3–7)}, 6–1	(United States) Richey Reneberg	(United States) Jonathan Stark (United States) Robbie Weiss	(United States) Patrick McEnroe (United States) Brad Gilbert (United States) Jimmy Arias (Italy) Renzo Furlan
3 Jan	Oahu Open; Oahu, HI, United States; ATP World Series; Hard – $288,750 – 32S/16D; Singles – Doubles	(Netherlands) Tom Nijssen (Czech Republic) Cyril Suk; 6–4, 6–4	(United States) Alex O'Brien (United States) Jonathan Stark	(United States) Jonathan Stark (United States) Robbie Weiss	(United States) Patrick McEnroe (United States) Brad Gilbert (United States) Jimmy Arias (Italy) Renzo Furlan
10 Jan	Indonesia Open; Jakarta, Indonesia; ATP World Series; Hard – $288,750 – 32S/16D; Singles – Doubles	(United States) Michael Chang; 6–3, 6–3	(Czech Republic) David Rikl	(Morocco) Younes El Aynaoui (Venezuela) Maurice Ruah	(United States) Robbie Weiss (Chinese Taipei) Bing Chao Lin (Morocco) Karim Alami (France) Jean-Philippe Fleurian
10 Jan	Indonesia Open; Jakarta, Indonesia; ATP World Series; Hard – $288,750 – 32S/16D; Singles – Doubles	(Sweden) Jonas Björkman (Australia) Neil Borwick; 6–4, 6–1	(Mexico) Jorge Lozano (United States) Jim Pugh	(Morocco) Younes El Aynaoui (Venezuela) Maurice Ruah	(United States) Robbie Weiss (Chinese Taipei) Bing Chao Lin (Morocco) Karim Alami (France) Jean-Philippe Fleurian
10 Jan	Peters New South Wales Open; Sydney, Australia; ATP World Series; Hard – $288,750 – 32S/16D; Singles – Doubles	(United States) Pete Sampras; 7–6^{(7–5)}, 6–4	(United States) Ivan Lendl	(Czech Republic) Petr Korda (United States) Todd Martin	(United States) Aaron Krickstein (Czech Republic) Daniel Vacek (Sweden) Nicklas Kulti (United States) Richey Reneberg
10 Jan	Peters New South Wales Open; Sydney, Australia; ATP World Series; Hard – $288,750 – 32S/16D; Singles – Doubles	(Australia) Darren Cahill (Australia) Sandon Stolle; 6–1, 7–6	(Australia) Mark Kratzmann (Australia) Laurie Warder	(Czech Republic) Petr Korda (United States) Todd Martin	(United States) Aaron Krickstein (Czech Republic) Daniel Vacek (Sweden) Nicklas Kulti (United States) Richey Reneberg
10 Jan	Benson and Hedges Open; Auckland, New Zealand; ATP World Series; Hard – $288,750 – 32S/16D; Singles – Doubles	(Sweden) Magnus Gustafsson; 6–4, 6–0	(United States) Patrick McEnroe	(Sweden) Thomas Enqvist (Germany) Karsten Braasch	(Spain) Tomás Carbonell (New Zealand) Brett Steven (South Africa) Marcos Ondruska (Switzerland) Jakob Hlasek
10 Jan	Benson and Hedges Open; Auckland, New Zealand; ATP World Series; Hard – $288,750 – 32S/16D; Singles – Doubles	(United States) Patrick McEnroe (United States) Jared Palmer; 6–2, 4–6, 6–4	(Canada) Grant Connell (United States) Patrick Galbraith	(Sweden) Thomas Enqvist (Germany) Karsten Braasch	(Spain) Tomás Carbonell (New Zealand) Brett Steven (South Africa) Marcos Ondruska (Switzerland) Jakob Hlasek
17 Jan; 24 Jan	Ford Australian Open; Melbourne, Australia; Grand Slam; Hard – $2,646,694 – 128S/64D/32XD; Singles – Doubles – Mixed doubles	(United States) Pete Sampras; 7–6^{(7–4)}, 6–4, 6–4	(United States) Todd Martin	(United States) Jim Courier (Sweden) Stefan Edberg	(Sweden) Magnus Gustafsson (Croatia) Goran Ivanišević (Austria) Thomas Muster (United States) MaliVai Washington
17 Jan; 24 Jan	Ford Australian Open; Melbourne, Australia; Grand Slam; Hard – $2,646,694 – 128S/64D/32XD; Singles – Doubles – Mixed doubles	(Netherlands) Jacco Eltingh (Netherlands) Paul Haarhuis; 6–7, 6–3, 6–4, 6–3	(Zimbabwe) Byron Black (United States) Jonathan Stark	(United States) Jim Courier (Sweden) Stefan Edberg	(Sweden) Magnus Gustafsson (Croatia) Goran Ivanišević (Austria) Thomas Muster (United States) MaliVai Washington
17 Jan; 24 Jan	Ford Australian Open; Melbourne, Australia; Grand Slam; Hard – $2,646,694 – 128S/64D/32XD; Singles – Doubles – Mixed doubles	(Latvia) Larisa Neiland (Russia) Andrei Olhovskiy; 7–5, 6–7^{(0–7)}, 6–2	(Czech Republic) Helena Suková (Australia) Todd Woodbridge	(United States) Jim Courier (Sweden) Stefan Edberg	(Sweden) Magnus Gustafsson (Croatia) Goran Ivanišević (Austria) Thomas Muster (United States) MaliVai Washington
31 Jan	Dubai Open; Dubai, United Arab Emirates; ATP World Series; Hard – $1,013,750 – 32S/16D; Singles – Doubles	(Sweden) Magnus Gustafsson; 6–4, 6–2	(Spain) Sergi Bruguera	(South Africa) Wayne Ferreira (Russia) Alexander Volkov	(Germany) Marc-Kevin Goellner (Czech Republic) Petr Korda (United States) Ivan Lendl (Sweden) Henrik Holm
31 Jan	Dubai Open; Dubai, United Arab Emirates; ATP World Series; Hard – $1,013,750 – 32S/16D; Singles – Doubles	(Australia) Todd Woodbridge (Australia) Mark Woodforde; 6–7, 6–4, 6–2	(Australia) Darren Cahill (Australia) John Fitzgerald	(South Africa) Wayne Ferreira (Russia) Alexander Volkov	(Germany) Marc-Kevin Goellner (Czech Republic) Petr Korda (United States) Ivan Lendl (Sweden) Henrik Holm
31 Jan	Marseille Open; Marseille, France; ATP World Series; Hard (i) – $513,750 – 32S/16D; Singles – Doubles	(Switzerland) Marc Rosset; 7–6^{(8–6)}, 7–6^{(7–4)}	(France) Arnaud Boetsch	(Germany) Michael Stich (Italy) Diego Nargiso	(Sweden) Jonas Björkman (Czech Republic) David Rikl (France) Henri Leconte (Spain) Tomás Carbonell
31 Jan	Marseille Open; Marseille, France; ATP World Series; Hard (i) – $513,750 – 32S/16D; Singles – Doubles	(Netherlands) Jan Siemerink (Czech Republic) Daniel Vacek; 6–7, 6–4, 6–1	(Czech Republic) Martin Damm (Russia) Yevgeny Kafelnikov	(Germany) Michael Stich (Italy) Diego Nargiso	(Sweden) Jonas Björkman (Czech Republic) David Rikl (France) Henri Leconte (Spain) Tomás Carbonell
31 Jan	Volvo Tennis Open; San Jose, California, United States; ATP World Series; Hard (i) – $288,750 – 32S/16D; Singles – Doubles	(Italy) Renzo Furlan; 3–6, 6–3, 7–5	(United States) Michael Chang	(Germany) Karsten Braasch (United States) Richey Reneberg	(France) Jean-Philippe Fleurian (United States) Bryan Shelton (United States) Jeff Tarango (United States) Brian MacPhie
31 Jan	Volvo Tennis Open; San Jose, California, United States; ATP World Series; Hard (i) – $288,750 – 32S/16D; Singles – Doubles	(United States) Rick Leach (United States) Jared Palmer; 4–6, 6–4, 6–4	(Zimbabwe) Byron Black (United States) Jonathan Stark	(Germany) Karsten Braasch (United States) Richey Reneberg	(France) Jean-Philippe Fleurian (United States) Bryan Shelton (United States) Jeff Tarango (United States) Brian MacPhie

=== February ===
Week	Tournament	Champions	Runners-up	Semifinalists	Quarterfinalists
7 Feb	Muratti Time Indoor; Milan, Italy; ATP Championship Series; Carpet (i) – $688,750 – 32S/16D; Singles	(Germany) Boris Becker; 6–2, 3–6, 6–3	(Czech Republic) Petr Korda	(Haiti) Ronald Agénor (Spain) Sergi Bruguera	(Australia) Wally Masur (France) Cédric Pioline (Croatia) Goran Ivanišević (Czech Republic) Karel Nováček
7 Feb	Muratti Time Indoor; Milan, Italy; ATP Championship Series; Carpet (i) – $688,750 – 32S/16D; Singles	(Netherlands) Tom Nijssen (Czech Republic) Cyril Suk; 4–6, 7–6, 7–6	(Netherlands) Hendrik Jan Davids (South Africa) Piet Norval	(Haiti) Ronald Agénor (Spain) Sergi Bruguera	(Australia) Wally Masur (France) Cédric Pioline (Croatia) Goran Ivanišević (Czech Republic) Karel Nováček
7 Feb	Kroger St. Jude International; Memphis, Tennessee, United States; ATP Championship Series; Hard (i) – $675,000 – 48S/24D	(United States) Todd Martin; 6–4, 7–5	(United States) Brad Gilbert	(United States) Patrick McEnroe (United States) Alex O'Brien	(United States) Jim Courier (Sweden) Thomas Enqvist (Germany) Karsten Braasch (Netherlands) Paul Haarhuis
7 Feb	Kroger St. Jude International; Memphis, Tennessee, United States; ATP Championship Series; Hard (i) – $675,000 – 48S/24D	(Zimbabwe) Byron Black (United States) Jonathan Stark; 6–2, 6–4	(United States) Jim Grabb (United States) Jared Palmer	(United States) Patrick McEnroe (United States) Alex O'Brien	(United States) Jim Courier (Sweden) Thomas Enqvist (Germany) Karsten Braasch (Netherlands) Paul Haarhuis
14 Feb	Comcast U.S. Indoor; Philadelphia, PA, United States; ATP Championship Series; Carpet (i) – $588,750 – 32S/16D; Singles – Doubles	(United States) Michael Chang; 6–3, 6–2	(Netherlands) Paul Haarhuis	(Peru) Jaime Yzaga (United States) Jim Courier	(Netherlands) Jacco Eltingh (United States) Jim Grabb (United States) Jonathan Stark (Russia) Andrei Chesnokov
14 Feb	Comcast U.S. Indoor; Philadelphia, PA, United States; ATP Championship Series; Carpet (i) – $588,750 – 32S/16D; Singles – Doubles	(Netherlands) Jacco Eltingh (Netherlands) Paul Haarhuis; 6–3, 6–4	(United States) Jim Grabb (United States) Jared Palmer	(Peru) Jaime Yzaga (United States) Jim Courier	(Netherlands) Jacco Eltingh (United States) Jim Grabb (United States) Jonathan Stark (Russia) Andrei Chesnokov
14 Feb	Eurocard Open; Stuttgart, Germany; ATP Championship Series; Carpet (i) – $2,125,000 – 32S/16D; Singles – Doubles	(Sweden) Stefan Edberg; 4–6, 6–4, 6–2, 6–2	(Croatia) Goran Ivanišević	(Germany) Boris Becker (Spain) Sergi Bruguera	(Germany) Michael Stich (France) Henri Leconte (Sweden) Magnus Gustafsson (France) Arnaud Boetsch
14 Feb	Eurocard Open; Stuttgart, Germany; ATP Championship Series; Carpet (i) – $2,125,000 – 32S/16D; Singles – Doubles	(South Africa) David Adams (Russia) Andrei Olhovskiy; 6–7, 6–4, 7–6	(Canada) Grant Connell (United States) Patrick Galbraith	(Germany) Boris Becker (Spain) Sergi Bruguera	(Germany) Michael Stich (France) Henri Leconte (Sweden) Magnus Gustafsson (France) Arnaud Boetsch
21 Feb	ABN AMRO World Tennis Tournament; Rotterdam, Netherlands; ATP World Series; Carpet (i) – $575,000 – 32S/16D; Singles – Doubles	(Germany) Michael Stich; 4–6, 6–3, 6–0	(South Africa) Wayne Ferreira	(Netherlands) Paul Haarhuis (Croatia) Goran Ivanišević	(France) Rodolphe Gilbert (Russia) Alexander Volkov (Russia) Yevgeny Kafelnikov (Sweden) Jonas Svensson
21 Feb	ABN AMRO World Tennis Tournament; Rotterdam, Netherlands; ATP World Series; Carpet (i) – $575,000 – 32S/16D; Singles – Doubles	(United Kingdom) Jeremy Bates (Sweden) Jonas Björkman; 6–4, 6–1	(Netherlands) Jacco Eltingh (Netherlands) Paul Haarhuis	(Netherlands) Paul Haarhuis (Croatia) Goran Ivanišević	(France) Rodolphe Gilbert (Russia) Alexander Volkov (Russia) Yevgeny Kafelnikov (Sweden) Jonas Svensson
21 Feb	Nuveen Championships; Scottsdale, Arizona, United States; ATP World Series; Hard – $288,750 – 32S/16D; Singles – Doubles	(United States) Andre Agassi; 6–4, 6–3	(Brazil) Luiz Mattar	(Germany) Karsten Braasch (United States) MaliVai Washington	(Spain) Jordi Burillo (United States) Brad Gilbert (United States) Chuck Adams (Italy) Stefano Pescosolido
21 Feb	Nuveen Championships; Scottsdale, Arizona, United States; ATP World Series; Hard – $288,750 – 32S/16D; Singles – Doubles	(Sweden) Jan Apell (United States) Ken Flach; 6–0, 6–4	(United States) Alex O'Brien (Australia) Sandon Stolle	(Germany) Karsten Braasch (United States) MaliVai Washington	(Spain) Jordi Burillo (United States) Brad Gilbert (United States) Chuck Adams (Italy) Stefano Pescosolido
21 Feb	Abierto Mexicano de Tennis; Mexico City, Mexico; ATP World Series; Clay – $300,000 – 32S/16D	(Austria) Thomas Muster; 6–3, 6–1	(Brazil) Roberto Jabali	(Spain) Àlex Corretja (Venezuela) Maurice Ruah	(United Kingdom) Mark Petchey (Czech Republic) Slava Doseděl (Czech Republic) David Rikl (United States) Bryan Shelton
21 Feb	Abierto Mexicano de Tennis; Mexico City, Mexico; ATP World Series; Clay – $300,000 – 32S/16D	(United States) Francisco Montana (United States) Bryan Shelton; 6–3, 6–4	(United States) Luke Jensen (United States) Murphy Jensen	(Spain) Àlex Corretja (Venezuela) Maurice Ruah	(United Kingdom) Mark Petchey (Czech Republic) Slava Doseděl (Czech Republic) David Rikl (United States) Bryan Shelton
28 Feb	Copenhagen Cup 56 Open; Copenhagen, Denmark; ATP World Series; Carpet (i) – $188,750 – 32S/16D; Singles – Doubles	(Russia) Yevgeny Kafelnikov; 6–3, 7–5	(Czech Republic) Daniel Vacek	(Austria) Alex Antonitsch (France) Jean-Philippe Fleurian	(Sweden) Magnus Gustafsson (Germany) Patrick Baur (Denmark) Kenneth Carlsen (Russia) Andrei Olhovskiy
28 Feb	Copenhagen Cup 56 Open; Copenhagen, Denmark; ATP World Series; Carpet (i) – $188,750 – 32S/16D; Singles – Doubles	(Czech Republic) Martin Damm (New Zealand) Brett Steven; 6–3, 6–4	(Germany) David Prinosil (Germany) Udo Riglewski	(Austria) Alex Antonitsch (France) Jean-Philippe Fleurian	(Sweden) Magnus Gustafsson (Germany) Patrick Baur (Denmark) Kenneth Carlsen (Russia) Andrei Olhovskiy
28 Feb; 7 Mar	Newsweek Champions Cup; Indian Wells, California, United States; ATP Championship Series, Single-Week; Hard – $1,470,000 – 56S/28D; Singles – Doubles	(United States) Pete Sampras; 4–6, 6–3, 3–6, 6–3, 6–2	(Czech Republic) Petr Korda	(Sweden) Stefan Edberg (United States) Aaron Krickstein	(Austria) Thomas Muster (Australia) Darren Cahill (Russia) Alexander Volkov (Spain) Carlos Costa
28 Feb; 7 Mar	Newsweek Champions Cup; Indian Wells, California, United States; ATP Championship Series, Single-Week; Hard – $1,470,000 – 56S/28D; Singles – Doubles	(Canada) Grant Connell (United States) Patrick Galbraith; 3–6, 6–1, 7–6	(Zimbabwe) Byron Black (United States) Jonathan Stark	(Sweden) Stefan Edberg (United States) Aaron Krickstein	(Austria) Thomas Muster (Australia) Darren Cahill (Russia) Alexander Volkov (Spain) Carlos Costa

=== March ===
Week	Tournament	Champions	Runners-up	Semifinalists	Quarterfinalists
7 Mar	Internacional de Zaragoza; Zaragoza, Spain; ATP World Series; Carpet (i) – $200,000 – 32S/16D	(Sweden) Magnus Larsson; 6–4, 6–4	(Germany) Lars Rehmann	(Sweden) Tomas Nydahl (Sweden) Anders Järryd	(Italy) Gianluca Pozzi (Russia) Yevgeny Kafelnikov (Germany) Patrik Kühnen (Germany) David Prinosil
7 Mar	Internacional de Zaragoza; Zaragoza, Spain; ATP World Series; Carpet (i) – $200,000 – 32S/16D	(Sweden) Henrik Holm (Sweden) Anders Järryd; 7–5, 6–2	(Czech Republic) Martin Damm (Czech Republic) Karel Nováček	(Sweden) Tomas Nydahl (Sweden) Anders Järryd	(Italy) Gianluca Pozzi (Russia) Yevgeny Kafelnikov (Germany) Patrik Kühnen (Germany) David Prinosil
7 Mar; 14 Mar	Lipton Championships; Key Biscayne, United States; ATP Championship Series, Single-Week; Hard – $1,625,000 – 96S/48D; Singles – Doubles	(United States) Pete Sampras; 5–7, 6–3, 6–3	(United States) Andre Agassi	(United States) Jim Courier (Australia) Patrick Rafter	(Czech Republic) Petr Korda (Croatia) Goran Ivanišević (United States) Jim Grabb (Sweden) Stefan Edberg
7 Mar; 14 Mar	Lipton Championships; Key Biscayne, United States; ATP Championship Series, Single-Week; Hard – $1,625,000 – 96S/48D; Singles – Doubles	(Netherlands) Jacco Eltingh (Netherlands) Paul Haarhuis; 7–6, 7–6	(The Bahamas) Mark Knowles (United States) Jared Palmer	(United States) Jim Courier (Australia) Patrick Rafter	(Czech Republic) Petr Korda (Croatia) Goran Ivanišević (United States) Jim Grabb (Sweden) Stefan Edberg
14 Mar	Grand Prix Hassan II; Casablanca, Morocco; ATP World Series; Clay – $188,750 – 32S/16D; Singles – Doubles	(Italy) Renzo Furlan; 6–2, 6–2	(Morocco) Karim Alami	(Austria) Gilbert Schaller (Morocco) Younes El Aynaoui	(Spain) Tomás Carbonell (Germany) Martin Sinner (Ukraine) Dimitri Poliakov (Spain) Óscar Martínez
14 Mar	Grand Prix Hassan II; Casablanca, Morocco; ATP World Series; Clay – $188,750 – 32S/16D; Singles – Doubles	(South Africa) David Adams (Netherlands) Menno Oosting; 6–3, 6–4	(Italy) Cristian Brandi (Italy) Federico Mordegan	(Austria) Gilbert Schaller (Morocco) Younes El Aynaoui	(Spain) Tomás Carbonell (Germany) Martin Sinner (Ukraine) Dimitri Poliakov (Spain) Óscar Martínez
21 Mar	Davis Cup by NEC: First round New Delhi, India – grass Eindhoven, Netherlands – carpet (i); Lund, Sweden – carpet (i); Besançon, France – hard (i); Ramat HaSharon, Israel – hard Saint Petersburg, Russia – carpet (i); Madrid, Spain – clay Graz, Austria – clay (i)	First round winners United States 5–0; Netherlands 5–0; Belgium 5—0; France 4–1; Czech Republic 4–1; Russia 4–1; Spain 4–1; Germany 3–2	First round losers India; Belgium; Denmark; Hungary; Israel; Australia; Italy; Austria		
28 Mar	Salem Open Osaka; Osaka, Japan; ATP World Series; Hard – $625,000 – 32S/16D	(United States) Pete Sampras; 6–2, 6–2	(France) Lionel Roux	(United States) Andre Agassi (Sweden) Henrik Holm	(France) Guillaume Raoux (United States) David Wheaton (United States) Aaron Krickstein (United States) Michael Chang
28 Mar	Salem Open Osaka; Osaka, Japan; ATP World Series; Hard – $625,000 – 32S/16D	(Czech Republic) Martin Damm (Australia) Sandon Stolle; 6–4, 6–4	(South Africa) David Adams (Russia) Andrei Olhovskiy	(United States) Andre Agassi (Sweden) Henrik Holm	(France) Guillaume Raoux (United States) David Wheaton (United States) Aaron Krickstein (United States) Michael Chang
28 Mar	Estoril Open; Oeiras, Portugal; ATP World Series; Clay – $500,000 – 32S/16D; Singles – Doubles	(Spain) Carlos Costa; 4–6, 7–5, 6–4	(Ukraine) Andrei Medvedev	(Spain) Albert Costa (Spain) Javier Sánchez	(Spain) Sergi Bruguera (Italy) Andrea Gaudenzi (Spain) Emilio Sánchez (Spain) Alberto Berasategui
28 Mar	Estoril Open; Oeiras, Portugal; ATP World Series; Clay – $500,000 – 32S/16D; Singles – Doubles	(Italy) Cristian Brandi (Italy) Federico Mordegan; Walkover	(Netherlands) Richard Krajicek (Netherlands) Menno Oosting	(Spain) Albert Costa (Spain) Javier Sánchez	(Spain) Sergi Bruguera (Italy) Andrea Gaudenzi (Spain) Emilio Sánchez (Spain) Alberto Berasategui
28 Mar	South African Outdoor Open; Sun City, South Africa; ATP World Series; Hard – $288,750 – 32S/16D	(Germany) Markus Zoecke; 6–4, 6–1	(Germany) Hendrik Dreekmann	(Russia) Alexander Volkov (Switzerland) Jakob Hlasek	(United Kingdom) Mark Petchey (South Africa) Marcos Ondruska (Austria) Thomas Muster (Sweden) Christian Bergström
28 Mar	South African Outdoor Open; Sun City, South Africa; ATP World Series; Hard – $288,750 – 32S/16D	(South Africa) Marius Barnard (South Africa) Brent Haygarth; 6–3, 7–5	(South Africa) Ellis Ferreira (South Africa) Grant Stafford	(Russia) Alexander Volkov (Switzerland) Jakob Hlasek	(United Kingdom) Mark Petchey (South Africa) Marcos Ondruska (Austria) Thomas Muster (Sweden) Christian Bergström

=== April ===
Week	Tournament	Champions	Runners-up	Semifinalists	Quarterfinalists
4 Apr	Trofeo Conde de Godó Renault Open; Barcelona, Spain; ATP Championship Series; Clay – $775,000 – 56S/28D; Singles – Doubles	(Netherlands) Richard Krajicek; 6–4, 7–6^{(8–6)}, 6–2	(Spain) Carlos Costa	(Spain) Àlex Corretja (Haiti) Ronald Agénor	(Spain) Jordi Arrese (Spain) Tomás Carbonell (Italy) Andrea Gaudenzi (Spain) Sergi Bruguera
4 Apr	Trofeo Conde de Godó Renault Open; Barcelona, Spain; ATP Championship Series; Clay – $775,000 – 56S/28D; Singles – Doubles	(Russia) Yevgeny Kafelnikov (Czech Republic) David Rikl; 5-7, 6–1, 6–4	(United States) Jim Courier (Spain) Javier Sánchez	(Spain) Àlex Corretja (Haiti) Ronald Agénor	(Spain) Jordi Arrese (Spain) Tomás Carbonell (Italy) Andrea Gaudenzi (Spain) Sergi Bruguera
4 Apr	Japan Open; Tokyo, Japan; ATP Championship Series; Hard – $928,750 – 56S/28D; Singles – Doubles	(United States) Pete Sampras; 6–4, 6–2	(United States) Michael Chang	(Sweden) Henrik Holm (Germany) Boris Becker	(Australia) Patrick Rafter (United States) Ivan Lendl (United States) Brad Gilbert (United States) David Wheaton
4 Apr	Japan Open; Tokyo, Japan; ATP Championship Series; Hard – $928,750 – 56S/28D; Singles – Doubles	(Sweden) Henrik Holm (Sweden) Anders Järryd; 7–6, 6–1	(Canada) Sébastien Lareau (United States) Patrick McEnroe	(Sweden) Henrik Holm (Germany) Boris Becker	(Australia) Patrick Rafter (United States) Ivan Lendl (United States) Brad Gilbert (United States) David Wheaton
11 Apr	Salem Open; Hong Kong, Hong Kong; ATP World Series; Hard – $295,000 – 32S/16D; Singles – Doubles	(United States) Michael Chang; 6–1, 6–3	(Australia) Patrick Rafter	(United States) Brad Gilbert (United States) Ivan Lendl	(Australia) Michael Tebbutt (Australia) Jamie Morgan (Czech Republic) Martin Damm (Canada) Greg Rusedski
11 Apr	Salem Open; Hong Kong, Hong Kong; ATP World Series; Hard – $295,000 – 32S/16D; Singles – Doubles	(United States) Jim Grabb (New Zealand) Brett Steven; Walkover	(Sweden) Jonas Björkman (Australia) Patrick Rafter	(United States) Brad Gilbert (United States) Ivan Lendl	(Australia) Michael Tebbutt (Australia) Jamie Morgan (Czech Republic) Martin Damm (Canada) Greg Rusedski
11 Apr	Philips Open; Nice, France; ATP World Series; Clay – $288,750 – 32S/16D; Singles – Doubles	(Spain) Alberto Berasategui; 6–4, 6–2	(United States) Jim Courier	(Czech Republic) Slava Doseděl (Switzerland) Marc Rosset	(Sweden) Stefan Edberg (France) Thierry Guardiola (Spain) Jordi Arrese (South Africa) Wayne Ferreira
11 Apr	Philips Open; Nice, France; ATP World Series; Clay – $288,750 – 32S/16D; Singles – Doubles	(Spain) Javier Sánchez (Australia) Mark Woodforde; 7–5, 6–3	(Netherlands) Hendrik Jan Davids (South Africa) Piet Norval	(Czech Republic) Slava Doseděl (Switzerland) Marc Rosset	(Sweden) Stefan Edberg (France) Thierry Guardiola (Spain) Jordi Arrese (South Africa) Wayne Ferreira
11 Apr	Eddleman U.S. Clay Court Championships; Birmingham, Alabama, US; ATP World Series; Clay – $288,350 – 32S/16D; Singles – Doubles	(Australia) Jason Stoltenberg; 6–3, 6–4	(Argentina) Gabriel Markus	(Uruguay) Marcelo Filippini (United States) Jared Palmer	(United States) David Witt (Netherlands) Jacco Eltingh (Argentina) Daniel Orsanic (Spain) José Francisco Altur
11 Apr	Eddleman U.S. Clay Court Championships; Birmingham, Alabama, US; ATP World Series; Clay – $288,350 – 32S/16D; Singles – Doubles	(United States) Richey Reneberg (South Africa) Christo van Rensburg; 2–6, 6–3, 6–2	(United States) Brian MacPhie (United States) David Witt	(Uruguay) Marcelo Filippini (United States) Jared Palmer	(United States) David Witt (Netherlands) Jacco Eltingh (Argentina) Daniel Orsanic (Spain) José Francisco Altur
18 Apr	KAL Cup Korea Open Tennis Championships; Seoul, South Korea; ATP World Series; Hard – $188,750 – 32S/16D; Singles – Doubles	(United Kingdom) Jeremy Bates; 6–4, 6–7^{(6–8)}, 6–3	(Germany) Jörn Renzenbrink	(United States) Jeff Tarango (Netherlands) Jan Siemerink	(Germany) Markus Zoecke (New Zealand) Brett Steven (Australia) Jamie Morgan (United States) Chuck Adams
18 Apr	KAL Cup Korea Open Tennis Championships; Seoul, South Korea; ATP World Series; Hard – $188,750 – 32S/16D; Singles – Doubles	(France) Stéphane Simian (United States) Kenny Thorne; 6–4, 3–6, 7–5	(United States) Kent Kinnear (Canada) Sébastien Lareau	(United States) Jeff Tarango (Netherlands) Jan Siemerink	(Germany) Markus Zoecke (New Zealand) Brett Steven (Australia) Jamie Morgan (United States) Chuck Adams
18 Apr	Volvo Monte Carlo Open; Roquebrune-Cap-Martin, France; ATP Championship Series, Single-Week; Clay – $1,470,000 – 64S/32D; Singles – Doubles	(Ukraine) Andrei Medvedev; 7–5, 6–1, 6–3	(Spain) Sergi Bruguera	(Russia) Yevgeny Kafelnikov (Sweden) Stefan Edberg	(Czech Republic) David Rikl (United States) Jim Courier (Croatia) Goran Ivanišević (Austria) Thomas Muster
18 Apr	Volvo Monte Carlo Open; Roquebrune-Cap-Martin, France; ATP Championship Series, Single-Week; Clay – $1,470,000 – 64S/32D; Singles – Doubles	(Sweden) Nicklas Kulti (Sweden) Magnus Larsson; 3–6, 7–6, 6–4	(Russia) Yevgeny Kafelnikov (Czech Republic) Daniel Vacek	(Russia) Yevgeny Kafelnikov (Sweden) Stefan Edberg	(Czech Republic) David Rikl (United States) Jim Courier (Croatia) Goran Ivanišević (Austria) Thomas Muster
25 Apr	AT&T Challenge; Atlanta, United States; ATP World Series; Clay – $288,750 – 32S/16D; Singles – Doubles	(United States) Michael Chang; 6–7^{(4–7)}, 7–6^{(7–4)}, 6–0	(United States) Todd Martin	(United States) MaliVai Washington (United States) Wade McGuire	(Sweden) Christian Bergström (United States) Andre Agassi (Sweden) Lars Jönsson (Sweden) Mats Wilander
25 Apr	AT&T Challenge; Atlanta, United States; ATP World Series; Clay – $288,750 – 32S/16D; Singles – Doubles	(United States) Jared Palmer (United States) Richey Reneberg; 4–6, 7–6, 6–4	(United States) Francisco Montana (United States) Jim Pugh	(United States) MaliVai Washington (United States) Wade McGuire	(Sweden) Christian Bergström (United States) Andre Agassi (Sweden) Lars Jönsson (Sweden) Mats Wilander
25 Apr	BMW Open; Munich, Germany; ATP World Series; Clay – $400,000 – 32S/16D; Singles – Doubles	(Germany) Michael Stich; 6–2, 2–6, 6–3	(Czech Republic) Petr Korda	(Russia) Andrei Chesnokov (Germany) Bernd Karbacher	(South Africa) / (South Africa) Wayne Ferreira (Czech Republic) David Rikl (Sweden) Magnus Gustafsson (Israel) Amos Mansdorf
25 Apr	BMW Open; Munich, Germany; ATP World Series; Clay – $400,000 – 32S/16D; Singles – Doubles	(Russia) Yevgeny Kafelnikov (Czech Republic) David Rikl; 7–6, 7–5	(Germany) Boris Becker (Czech Republic) Petr Korda	(Russia) Andrei Chesnokov (Germany) Bernd Karbacher	(South Africa) / (South Africa) Wayne Ferreira (Czech Republic) David Rikl (Sweden) Magnus Gustafsson (Israel) Amos Mansdorf
25 Apr	Trofeo Villa de Madrid; Madrid, Spain; ATP World Series; Clay – $775,000 – 32S/16D; Singles – Doubles	(Austria) Thomas Muster; 6–2, 3–6, 6–4, 7–5	(Spain) Sergi Bruguera	(Peru) Jaime Yzaga (Spain) Àlex Corretja	(Sweden) Stefan Edberg (United States) Ivan Lendl (Spain) Carlos Costa (Switzerland) Jakob Hlasek
25 Apr	Trofeo Villa de Madrid; Madrid, Spain; ATP World Series; Clay – $775,000 – 32S/16D; Singles – Doubles	(Sweden) Rikard Bergh (Netherlands) Menno Oosting; 6–3, 6–4	(France) Jean-Philippe Fleurian (Switzerland) Jakob Hlasek	(Peru) Jaime Yzaga (Spain) Àlex Corretja	(Sweden) Stefan Edberg (United States) Ivan Lendl (Spain) Carlos Costa (Switzerland) Jakob Hlasek

=== May ===
Week	Tournament	Champions	Runners-up	Semifinalists	Quarterfinalists
2 May	Panasonic German Open; Hamburg, Germany; ATP Championship Series, Single-Week; Clay – $1,470,000 – 56S/28D; Singles – Doubles	(Ukraine) Andrei Medvedev; 6–4, 6–4, 3–6, 6–3	(Russia) Yevgeny Kafelnikov	(Germany) Michael Stich (Spain) Javier Sánchez	(Spain) Carlos Costa (Netherlands) Richard Krajicek (Sweden) Magnus Gustafsson (Netherlands) Jacco Eltingh
2 May	Panasonic German Open; Hamburg, Germany; ATP Championship Series, Single-Week; Clay – $1,470,000 – 56S/28D; Singles – Doubles	(United States) Scott Melville (South Africa) Piet Norval; 6–3, 6–4	(Sweden) Henrik Holm (Sweden) Anders Järryd	(Germany) Michael Stich (Spain) Javier Sánchez	(Spain) Carlos Costa (Netherlands) Richard Krajicek (Sweden) Magnus Gustafsson (Netherlands) Jacco Eltingh
2 May	USTA Clay Court Classic; Pinehurst, North Carolina, United States; ATP World Series; Clay – $250,000 – 32S/16D	(United States) Jared Palmer; 6–4, 7–6^{(7–5)}	(United States) Todd Martin	(Sweden) Mats Wilander (Australia) Mark Woodforde	(France) Fabrice Santoro (United States) Vincent Spadea (Argentina) Franco Davín (Spain) Francisco Clavet
2 May	USTA Clay Court Classic; Pinehurst, North Carolina, United States; ATP World Series; Clay – $250,000 – 32S/16D	(Australia) Todd Woodbridge (Australia) Mark Woodforde; 6–2, 3–6, 6–3	(United States) Jared Palmer (United States) Richey Reneberg	(Sweden) Mats Wilander (Australia) Mark Woodforde	(France) Fabrice Santoro (United States) Vincent Spadea (Argentina) Franco Davín (Spain) Francisco Clavet
9 May	Internazionali d'Italia; Rome, Italy; ATP Championship Series, Single-Week; Clay – $1,750,000 – 64S/32D; Singles – Doubles	(United States) Pete Sampras; 6–1, 6–2, 6–2	(Germany) Boris Becker	(Czech Republic) Slava Doseděl (Croatia) Goran Ivanišević	(Italy) Andrea Gaudenzi (United States) Jim Courier (Netherlands) Jacco Eltingh (Germany) Michael Stich
9 May	Internazionali d'Italia; Rome, Italy; ATP Championship Series, Single-Week; Clay – $1,750,000 – 64S/32D; Singles – Doubles	(Russia) Yevgeny Kafelnikov (Czech Republic) David Rikl; 6–1, 7–5	(South Africa) Wayne Ferreira (Spain) Javier Sánchez	(Czech Republic) Slava Doseděl (Croatia) Goran Ivanišević	(Italy) Andrea Gaudenzi (United States) Jim Courier (Netherlands) Jacco Eltingh (Germany) Michael Stich
9 May	America's Red Clay Tennis Championships; Coral Springs, FL, United States; ATP World Series; Clay – $215,000 – 32S/16D; Singles – Doubles	(Brazil) Luiz Mattar; 6–4, 3–6, 6–3	(Australia) Jamie Morgan	(Brazil) Fernando Meligeni (Australia) Mark Woodforde	(United States) Jared Palmer (Argentina) Franco Davín (United States) Bryan Shelton (United States) Ivan Lendl
9 May	America's Red Clay Tennis Championships; Coral Springs, FL, United States; ATP World Series; Clay – $215,000 – 32S/16D; Singles – Doubles	(South Africa) Lan Bale (New Zealand) Brett Steven; 6–3, 7–5	(United States) Ken Flach (France) Stéphane Simian	(Brazil) Fernando Meligeni (Australia) Mark Woodforde	(United States) Jared Palmer (Argentina) Franco Davín (United States) Bryan Shelton (United States) Ivan Lendl
16 May	Internazionali di Carisbo; Bologna, Italy; ATP World Series; Clay – $288,750 – 32S/16D; Singles – Doubles	(Spain) Javier Sánchez; 7–6^{(7–3)}, 4–6, 6–3	(Spain) Alberto Berasategui	(Czech Republic) Slava Doseděl (Italy) Stefano Pescosolido	(Italy) Federico Mordegan (Italy) Andrea Gaudenzi (United States) Jordi Burillo (United States) Jeff Tarango
16 May	Internazionali di Carisbo; Bologna, Italy; ATP World Series; Clay – $288,750 – 32S/16D; Singles – Doubles	(Australia) John Fitzgerald (Australia) Patrick Rafter; 6–3, 6–3	(Czech Republic) Vojtěch Flégl (Australia) Andrew Florent	(Czech Republic) Slava Doseděl (Italy) Stefano Pescosolido	(Italy) Federico Mordegan (Italy) Andrea Gaudenzi (United States) Jordi Burillo (United States) Jeff Tarango
16 May	Peugeot World Team Cup; Düsseldorf, Germany	Germany; 2–1	Spain		
23 May; 30 May	French Open; Paris, France; Grand Slam; Clay – $4,090,101 – 128S/64D/48XD; Singles – Doubles – Mixed doubles	(Spain) Sergi Bruguera; 6–3, 7–5, 2–6, 6–1	(Spain) Alberto Berasategui	(United States) Jim Courier (Sweden) Magnus Larsson	(United States) Pete Sampras (Ukraine) Andrei Medvedev (Croatia) Goran Ivanišević (Germany) Hendrik Dreekmann
23 May; 30 May	French Open; Paris, France; Grand Slam; Clay – $4,090,101 – 128S/64D/48XD; Singles – Doubles – Mixed doubles	(Zimbabwe) Byron Black (United States) Jonathan Stark; 6–4, 7–6	(Sweden) Jan Apell (Sweden) Jonas Björkman	(United States) Jim Courier (Sweden) Magnus Larsson	(United States) Pete Sampras (Ukraine) Andrei Medvedev (Croatia) Goran Ivanišević (Germany) Hendrik Dreekmann
23 May; 30 May	French Open; Paris, France; Grand Slam; Clay – $4,090,101 – 128S/64D/48XD; Singles – Doubles – Mixed doubles	(Netherlands) Kristie Boogert (Netherlands) Menno Oosting; 7–5, 3–6, 7–5	(Latvia) Larisa Savchenko-Neiland (Russia) Andrei Olhovskiy	(United States) Jim Courier (Sweden) Magnus Larsson	(United States) Pete Sampras (Ukraine) Andrei Medvedev (Croatia) Goran Ivanišević (Germany) Hendrik Dreekmann

=== June ===
Week	Tournament	Champions	Runners-up	Semifinalists	Quarterfinalists
6 Jun	Torneo Internazionale Città di Firenze; Florence, Italy; ATP World Series; Clay – $288,750 – 32S/16D; Singles – Doubles	(Uruguay) Marcelo Filippini; 3–6, 6–3, 6–3	(Australia) Richard Fromberg	(Italy) Paolo Canè (Germany) Bernd Karbacher	(Germany) Marc-Kevin Goellner (Argentina) Horacio de la Peña (Argentina) Gabriel Markus (Spain) Francisco Clavet
6 Jun	Torneo Internazionale Città di Firenze; Florence, Italy; ATP World Series; Clay – $288,750 – 32S/16D; Singles – Doubles	(Australia) Jon Ireland (United States) Kenny Thorne; 7–6, 6–3	(United Kingdom) Neil Broad (United States) Greg Van Emburgh	(Italy) Paolo Canè (Germany) Bernd Karbacher	(Germany) Marc-Kevin Goellner (Argentina) Horacio de la Peña (Argentina) Gabriel Markus (Spain) Francisco Clavet
6 Jun	Stella Artois Championships; London, Great Britain; ATP World Series; Grass – $600,000 – 56S/28D; Singles – Doubles	(United States) Todd Martin; 7–6^{(7–4)}, 7–6^{(7–4)}	(United States) Pete Sampras	(Sweden) Jan Apell (South Africa) Christo van Rensburg	(South Africa) Wayne Ferreira (United Kingdom) Jeremy Bates (Sweden) Stefan Edberg (Australia) Jamie Morgan
6 Jun	Stella Artois Championships; London, Great Britain; ATP World Series; Grass – $600,000 – 56S/28D; Singles – Doubles	(Sweden) Jan Apell (Sweden) Jonas Björkman; 3–6, 7–6, 6–4	(Australia) Todd Woodbridge (Australia) Mark Woodforde	(Sweden) Jan Apell (South Africa) Christo van Rensburg	(South Africa) Wayne Ferreira (United Kingdom) Jeremy Bates (Sweden) Stefan Edberg (Australia) Jamie Morgan
6 Jun	Continental Grass Court Championships; Rosmalen, Netherlands; ATP World Series; Grass – $288,750 – 32S/16D; Singles – Doubles	(Netherlands) Richard Krajicek; 6–3, 6–4	(Germany) Karsten Braasch	(France) Henri Leconte (South Africa) David Adams	(Austria) Alex Antonitsch (Australia) Simon Youl (Australia) Wally Masur (Netherlands) Jacco Eltingh
6 Jun	Continental Grass Court Championships; Rosmalen, Netherlands; ATP World Series; Grass – $288,750 – 32S/16D; Singles – Doubles	(Netherlands) Stephen Noteboom (Netherlands) Fernon Wibier; 6–3, 1–6, 7–6	(Italy) Diego Nargiso (Sweden) Peter Nyborg	(France) Henri Leconte (South Africa) David Adams	(Austria) Alex Antonitsch (Australia) Simon Youl (Australia) Wally Masur (Netherlands) Jacco Eltingh
13 Jun	Gerry Weber Open; Halle, Germany; ATP World Series; Grass – $500,000 – 32S/16D; Singles – Doubles	(Germany) Michael Stich; 6–4, 4–6, 6–3	(Sweden) Magnus Larsson	(Australia) Wally Masur (Russia) Yevgeny Kafelnikov	(France) Henri Leconte (Switzerland) Jakob Hlasek (United States) Jim Courier (Germany) Marc-Kevin Goellner
13 Jun	Gerry Weber Open; Halle, Germany; ATP World Series; Grass – $500,000 – 32S/16D; Singles – Doubles	(France) Olivier Delaître (France) Guy Forget; 6–4, 6–7, 6–4	(France) Henri Leconte (South Africa) Gary Muller	(Australia) Wally Masur (Russia) Yevgeny Kafelnikov	(France) Henri Leconte (Switzerland) Jakob Hlasek (United States) Jim Courier (Germany) Marc-Kevin Goellner
13 Jun	Hypo Group Tennis International; St. Poelten, Austria; ATP World Series; Clay – $300,000 – 32S/16D	(Austria) Thomas Muster; 4–6, 6–2, 6–4	(Spain) Tomás Carbonell	(Spain) Francisco Roig (Czech Republic) Slava Doseděl	(Austria) Wolfgang Schranz (Slovakia) Karol Kučera (Spain) Francisco Clavet (Israel) Gilad Bloom
13 Jun	Hypo Group Tennis International; St. Poelten, Austria; ATP World Series; Clay – $300,000 – 32S/16D	(Czech Republic) Vojtěch Flégl (Australia) Andrew Florent; 3–6, 6–1, 6–4	(Malaysia) Adam Malik (United States) Jeff Tarango	(Spain) Francisco Roig (Czech Republic) Slava Doseděl	(Austria) Wolfgang Schranz (Slovakia) Karol Kučera (Spain) Francisco Clavet (Israel) Gilad Bloom
13 Jun	Direct Line Insurance Manchester Open; Manchester, Great Britain; ATP World Series; Grass – $290,000 – 32S/16D; Singles – Doubles	(Australia) Patrick Rafter; 7–6^{(7–5)}, 7–6^{(7–4)}	(South Africa) Wayne Ferreira	(Australia) Jason Stoltenberg (Czech Republic) Karel Nováček	(Canada) Greg Rusedski (United States) Alex O'Brien (United Kingdom) Mark Petchey (Netherlands) Jacco Eltingh
13 Jun	Direct Line Insurance Manchester Open; Manchester, Great Britain; ATP World Series; Grass – $290,000 – 32S/16D; Singles – Doubles	(United States) Rick Leach (South Africa) Danie Visser; 6–4, 4–6, 7–6	(United States) Scott Davis (United States) Trevor Kronemann	(Australia) Jason Stoltenberg (Czech Republic) Karel Nováček	(Canada) Greg Rusedski (United States) Alex O'Brien (United Kingdom) Mark Petchey (Netherlands) Jacco Eltingh
20 Jun; 27 Jun	The Championships, Wimbledon; London, Great Britain; Grand Slam; Grass – $3,920,625 – 128S/64D/64XD; Singles – Doubles – Mixed doubles	(United States) Pete Sampras; 7–6^{(7–2)}, 7–6^{(7–5)}, 6–0	(Croatia) Goran Ivanišević	(United States) Todd Martin (Germany) Boris Becker	(United States) Michael Chang (South Africa) Wayne Ferreira (France) Guy Forget (Sweden) Christian Bergström
20 Jun; 27 Jun	The Championships, Wimbledon; London, Great Britain; Grand Slam; Grass – $3,920,625 – 128S/64D/64XD; Singles – Doubles – Mixed doubles	(Australia) Todd Woodbridge (Australia) Mark Woodforde; 7–6^{(7–3)}, 6–3, 6–1	(Canada) Grant Connell (United States) Patrick Galbraith	(United States) Todd Martin (Germany) Boris Becker	(United States) Michael Chang (South Africa) Wayne Ferreira (France) Guy Forget (Sweden) Christian Bergström
20 Jun; 27 Jun	The Championships, Wimbledon; London, Great Britain; Grand Slam; Grass – $3,920,625 – 128S/64D/64XD; Singles – Doubles – Mixed doubles	(Czech Republic) Helena Suková (Australia) Todd Woodbridge; 3–6, 7–5, 6–3	(United States) Lori McNeil (United States) T. J. Middleton	(United States) Todd Martin (Germany) Boris Becker	(United States) Michael Chang (South Africa) Wayne Ferreira (France) Guy Forget (Sweden) Christian Bergström

=== July ===
Week	Tournament	Champions	Runners-up	Semifinalists	Quarterfinalists
4 Jul	RADO Swiss Open; Gstaad, Switzerland; ATP World Series; Clay – $450,000 – 32S/16D; Singles – Doubles	(Spain) Sergi Bruguera; 3–6, 7–5, 6–2, 6–1	(France) Guy Forget	(Italy) Andrea Gaudenzi (Russia) Yevgeny Kafelnikov	(Spain) Emilio Sánchez (Chile) Marcelo Ríos (Austria) Thomas Muster (France) Arnaud Boetsch
4 Jul	RADO Swiss Open; Gstaad, Switzerland; ATP World Series; Clay – $450,000 – 32S/16D; Singles – Doubles	(Spain) Sergio Casal (Spain) Emilio Sánchez; 7–6, 6–4	(Netherlands) Menno Oosting (Czech Republic) Daniel Vacek	(Italy) Andrea Gaudenzi (Russia) Yevgeny Kafelnikov	(Spain) Emilio Sánchez (Chile) Marcelo Ríos (Austria) Thomas Muster (France) Arnaud Boetsch
4 Jul	Miller Lite Hall of Fame Championships; Newport, Rhode Island, United States; ATP World Series; Grass – $215,000 – 32S/16D; Singles – Doubles	(United States) David Wheaton; 6–4, 3–6, 7–6^{(7–5)}	(Australia) Todd Woodbridge	(United Kingdom) Mark Petchey (Zimbabwe) Byron Black	(United States) David Witt (Germany) David Prinosil (South Africa) Mark Kaplan (Australia) Jason Stoltenberg
4 Jul	Miller Lite Hall of Fame Championships; Newport, Rhode Island, United States; ATP World Series; Grass – $215,000 – 32S/16D; Singles – Doubles	(Austria) Alex Antonitsch (Canada) Greg Rusedski; 6–4, 3–6, 6–4	(United States) Kent Kinnear (United States) David Wheaton	(United Kingdom) Mark Petchey (Zimbabwe) Byron Black	(United States) David Witt (Germany) David Prinosil (South Africa) Mark Kaplan (Australia) Jason Stoltenberg
4 Jul	Swedish Open; Båstad, Sweden; ATP World Series; Clay – $288,750 – 32S/16D; Singles – Doubles	(Germany) Bernd Karbacher; 6–4, 6–3	(Austria) Horst Skoff	(Australia) Richard Fromberg (France) Jean-Philippe Fleurian	(Sweden) Jan Apell (Argentina) Daniel Orsanic (Spain) Tomás Carbonell (Russia) Andrei Chesnokov
4 Jul	Swedish Open; Båstad, Sweden; ATP World Series; Clay – $288,750 – 32S/16D; Singles – Doubles	(Sweden) Jan Apell (Sweden) Jonas Björkman; 6–2, 6–3	(Sweden) Nicklas Kulti (Sweden) Mikael Tillström	(Australia) Richard Fromberg (France) Jean-Philippe Fleurian	(Sweden) Jan Apell (Argentina) Daniel Orsanic (Spain) Tomás Carbonell (Russia) Andrei Chesnokov
11 Jul	Davis Cup sponsored by NEC; Rotterdam, Netherlands – hard (i); Cannes, France – hard Saint Petersburg, Russia – carpet Halle, Germany – grass	Quarterfinal winners United States 3–2; Sweden 3–2; Russia 3–2; Germany 3–2	Quarterfinal losers Netherlands; France; Czech Republic; Spain		
18 Jul	Mercedes Cup; Stuttgart, Germany; ATP Championship Series; Clay – $915,000 – 48S/24D; Singles – Doubles	(Spain) Alberto Berasategui; 7–5, 6–3, 7–6^{(7–5)}	(Italy) Andrea Gaudenzi	(Russia) Andrei Chesnokov (Germany) Bernd Karbacher	(Germany) Michael Stich (Austria) Thomas Muster (Russia) Yevgeny Kafelnikov (Sweden) Lars Jönsson
18 Jul	Mercedes Cup; Stuttgart, Germany; ATP Championship Series; Clay – $915,000 – 48S/24D; Singles – Doubles	(United States) Scott Melville (South Africa) Piet Norval; 7–6, 7–5	(Netherlands) Jacco Eltingh (Netherlands) Paul Haarhuis	(Russia) Andrei Chesnokov (Germany) Bernd Karbacher	(Germany) Michael Stich (Austria) Thomas Muster (Russia) Yevgeny Kafelnikov (Sweden) Lars Jönsson
18 Jul	Legg Mason Tennis Classic; Washington, United States; ATP Championship Series; Hard – $525,000 – 56S/28D	(Sweden) Stefan Edberg; 6–4, 6–2	(Australia) Jason Stoltenberg	(United States) David Wheaton (Zimbabwe) Byron Black	(Australia) Michael Tebbutt (New Zealand) Brett Steven (Sweden) Thomas Enqvist (United States) Aaron Krickstein
18 Jul	Legg Mason Tennis Classic; Washington, United States; ATP Championship Series; Hard – $525,000 – 56S/28D	(Canada) Grant Connell (United States) Patrick Galbraith; 6–4, 4–6, 6–3	(Sweden) Jonas Björkman (Switzerland) Jakob Hlasek	(United States) David Wheaton (Zimbabwe) Byron Black	(Australia) Michael Tebbutt (New Zealand) Brett Steven (Sweden) Thomas Enqvist (United States) Aaron Krickstein
25 Jul	Matinée Ltd. Canadian Open; Toronto, Ontario, Canada; ATP Championship Series, Single-Week; Hard – $1,470,000 – 56S/28D; Singles – Doubles	(United States) Andre Agassi; 6–4, 6–4	(Australia) Jason Stoltenberg	(South Africa) Wayne Ferreira (United States) Jim Courier	(Spain) Sergi Bruguera (United States) MaliVai Washington (Sweden) Thomas Enqvist (United States) Richey Reneberg
25 Jul	Matinée Ltd. Canadian Open; Toronto, Ontario, Canada; ATP Championship Series, Single-Week; Hard – $1,470,000 – 56S/28D; Singles – Doubles	(Zimbabwe) Byron Black (United States) Jonathan Stark; 7–6, 7–6	(United States) Patrick McEnroe (United States) Jared Palmer	(South Africa) Wayne Ferreira (United States) Jim Courier	(Spain) Sergi Bruguera (United States) MaliVai Washington (Sweden) Thomas Enqvist (United States) Richey Reneberg
25 Jul	Dutch Open; Hilversum, Netherlands; ATP World Series; Clay – $275,000 – 32S/16D; Singles – Doubles	(Czech Republic) Karel Nováček; 7–6, 6–4, 7–6^{(9–7)}	(Australia) Richard Fromberg	(Spain) Alberto Berasategui (Chile) Marcelo Ríos	(Italy) Renzo Furlan (Czech Republic) Slava Doseděl (France) Guy Forget (Austria) Gilbert Schaller
25 Jul	Dutch Open; Hilversum, Netherlands; ATP World Series; Clay – $275,000 – 32S/16D; Singles – Doubles	(Argentina) Daniel Orsanic (Netherlands) Jan Siemerink; 6–4, 6–2	(South Africa) David Adams (Russia) Andrei Olhovskiy	(Spain) Alberto Berasategui (Chile) Marcelo Ríos	(Italy) Renzo Furlan (Czech Republic) Slava Doseděl (France) Guy Forget (Austria) Gilbert Schaller

=== August ===
Week	Tournament	Champions	Runners-up	Semifinalists	Quarterfinalists
1 Aug	EA Generali Open; Kitzbühel, Austria; ATP World Series; Clay – $375,000 – 48S/26D; Singles – Doubles	(Croatia) Goran Ivanišević; 6–2, 4–6, 4–6, 6–3, 6–2	(France) Fabrice Santoro	(Spain) Tomás Carbonell (Austria) Thomas Muster	(Brazil) Fernando Meligeni (Spain) Javier Sánchez (Austria) Gilbert Schaller (Germany) Oliver Gross
1 Aug	EA Generali Open; Kitzbühel, Austria; ATP World Series; Clay – $375,000 – 48S/26D; Singles – Doubles	(South Africa) David Adams (Russia) Andrei Olhovskiy; 6–7, 6–3, 7–5	(Spain) Sergio Casal (Spain) Emilio Sánchez	(Spain) Tomás Carbonell (Austria) Thomas Muster	(Brazil) Fernando Meligeni (Spain) Javier Sánchez (Austria) Gilbert Schaller (Germany) Oliver Gross
1 Aug	Skoda Czech Open; Prague, Czech Republic; ATP World Series; Clay – $340,000 – 32S/16D; Singles – Doubles	(Spain) Sergi Bruguera; 6–3, 6–4	(Ukraine) Andrei Medvedev	(Spain) Albert Costa (Czech Republic) Slava Doseděl	(Czech Republic) Karel Nováček (Russia) Andrei Chesnokov (Spain) Àlex Corretja (Spain) Óscar Martínez
1 Aug	Skoda Czech Open; Prague, Czech Republic; ATP World Series; Clay – $340,000 – 32S/16D; Singles – Doubles	(Czech Republic) Karel Nováček (Sweden) Mats Wilander; Walkover	(Czech Republic) Tomáš Krupa (Czech Republic) Pavel Vízner	(Spain) Albert Costa (Czech Republic) Slava Doseděl	(Czech Republic) Karel Nováček (Russia) Andrei Chesnokov (Spain) Àlex Corretja (Spain) Óscar Martínez
1 Aug	Los Angeles Open; Los Angeles, United States; ATP World Series; Hard – $288,750 – 32S/16D; Singles – Doubles	(Germany) Boris Becker; 6–2, 6–2	(Australia) Mark Woodforde	(Netherlands) Richard Krajicek (Australia) Jason Stoltenberg	(United States) Jared Palmer (Sweden) Jan Apell (United States) Andre Agassi (Germany) Karsten Braasch
1 Aug	Los Angeles Open; Los Angeles, United States; ATP World Series; Hard – $288,750 – 32S/16D; Singles – Doubles	(Australia) John Fitzgerald (Australia) Mark Woodforde; 4–6, 6–2, 6–0	(United States) Scott Davis (United States) Brian MacPhie	(Netherlands) Richard Krajicek (Australia) Jason Stoltenberg	(United States) Jared Palmer (Sweden) Jan Apell (United States) Andre Agassi (Germany) Karsten Braasch
8 Aug	Thriftway ATP Championships; Mason, United States; ATP Championship Series, Single-Week; Hard – $1,470,000 – 56S/28D; Singles – Doubles	(United States) Michael Chang; 6–2, 7–5	(Sweden) Stefan Edberg	(United States) David Wheaton (Germany) Michael Stich	(United States) Jim Courier (Australia) Jason Stoltenberg (United States) Alex O'Brien (Israel) Amos Mansdorf
8 Aug	Thriftway ATP Championships; Mason, United States; ATP Championship Series, Single-Week; Hard – $1,470,000 – 56S/28D; Singles – Doubles	(United States) Alex O'Brien (Australia) Sandon Stolle; 6–7, 6–3, 6–2	(South Africa) Wayne Ferreira (Australia) Mark Kratzmann	(United States) David Wheaton (Germany) Michael Stich	(United States) Jim Courier (Australia) Jason Stoltenberg (United States) Alex O'Brien (Israel) Amos Mansdorf
8 Aug	Campionati Internazionali di San Marino; San Marino, San Marino; ATP World Series; Clay – $275,000 – 32S/16D; Singles – Doubles	(Spain) Carlos Costa; 6–1, 6–3	(Germany) Oliver Gross	(Uruguay) Marcelo Filippini (Belgium) Christophe Van Garsse	(Spain) Alberto Berasategui (Sweden) Lars Jönsson (Italy) Renzo Furlan (Spain) Álex López Morón
8 Aug	Campionati Internazionali di San Marino; San Marino, San Marino; ATP World Series; Clay – $275,000 – 32S/16D; Singles – Doubles	(United Kingdom) Neil Broad (United States) Greg Van Emburgh; 6–4, 7–6	(Spain) Jordi Arrese (Italy) Renzo Furlan	(Uruguay) Marcelo Filippini (Belgium) Christophe Van Garsse	(Spain) Alberto Berasategui (Sweden) Lars Jönsson (Italy) Renzo Furlan (Spain) Álex López Morón
15 Aug	RCA US Men's Hardcourt Championships; Indianapolis, IN, United States; ATP Championship Series; Hard – $915,000 – 56S/28D; Singles – Doubles	(South Africa) Wayne Ferreira; 6–2, 6–1	(France) Olivier Delaître	(Spain) Àlex Corretja (Germany) Bernd Karbacher	(Sweden) Thomas Enqvist (Sweden) Stefan Edberg (United States) Jonathan Stark (United States) Richey Reneberg
15 Aug	RCA US Men's Hardcourt Championships; Indianapolis, IN, United States; ATP Championship Series; Hard – $915,000 – 56S/28D; Singles – Doubles	(Australia) Todd Woodbridge (Australia) Mark Woodforde; 6–3, 6–4	(United States) Jim Grabb (United States) Richey Reneberg	(Spain) Àlex Corretja (Germany) Bernd Karbacher	(Sweden) Thomas Enqvist (Sweden) Stefan Edberg (United States) Jonathan Stark (United States) Richey Reneberg
15 Aug	Volvo International; New Haven, United States; ATP Championship Series; Hard – $915,000 – 56S/28D; Singles – Doubles	(Germany) Boris Becker; 6–3, 7–5	(Switzerland) Marc Rosset	(Germany) Michael Stich (Russia) Yevgeny Kafelnikov	(Australia) Patrick Rafter (United States) MaliVai Washington (Germany) Marc-Kevin Goellner (Ukraine) Andrei Medvedev
15 Aug	Volvo International; New Haven, United States; ATP Championship Series; Hard – $915,000 – 56S/28D; Singles – Doubles	(Canada) Grant Connell (United States) Patrick Galbraith; 6–4, 7–6	(Netherlands) Jacco Eltingh (Netherlands) Paul Haarhuis	(Germany) Michael Stich (Russia) Yevgeny Kafelnikov	(Australia) Patrick Rafter (United States) MaliVai Washington (Germany) Marc-Kevin Goellner (Ukraine) Andrei Medvedev
22 Aug	Waldbaum's Hamlet Cup; Long Island, United States; ATP World Series; Hard – $288,750 – 32S/16D; Singles – Doubles	(Russia) Yevgeny Kafelnikov; 5–7, 6–1, 6–2	(France) Cédric Pioline	(United States) Richey Reneberg (Italy) Renzo Furlan	(Czech Republic) Karel Nováček (United States) Michael Chang (United States) Todd Martin (United States) MaliVai Washington
22 Aug	Waldbaum's Hamlet Cup; Long Island, United States; ATP World Series; Hard – $288,750 – 32S/16D; Singles – Doubles	(France) Olivier Delaître (France) Guy Forget; 6–4, 7–6	(Australia) Andrew Florent (United Kingdom) Mark Petchey	(United States) Richey Reneberg (Italy) Renzo Furlan	(Czech Republic) Karel Nováček (United States) Michael Chang (United States) Todd Martin (United States) MaliVai Washington
22 Aug	OTB International; Schenectady, NY, United States; ATP World Series; Hard – $288,750 – 32S/16D; Singles – Doubles	(Netherlands) Jacco Eltingh; 6–3, 6–4	(United States) Chuck Adams	(Sweden) Jonas Björkman (Germany) Jörn Renzenbrink	(Morocco) Younes El Aynaoui (Sweden) Thomas Enqvist (Germany) Marc-Kevin Goellner (Sweden) Jan Apell
22 Aug	OTB International; Schenectady, NY, United States; ATP World Series; Hard – $288,750 – 32S/16D; Singles – Doubles	(Sweden) Jan Apell (Sweden) Jonas Björkman; 6–4, 7–6	(Netherlands) Jacco Eltingh (Netherlands) Paul Haarhuis	(Sweden) Jonas Björkman (Germany) Jörn Renzenbrink	(Morocco) Younes El Aynaoui (Sweden) Thomas Enqvist (Germany) Marc-Kevin Goellner (Sweden) Jan Apell
22 Aug	International Championships of Croatia-Umag; Umag, Croatia; ATP World Series; Clay – $375,000 – 32S/16D; Singles – Doubles	(Spain) Alberto Berasategui; 6–2, 6–4	(Slovakia) Karol Kučera	(Spain) Jordi Arrese (Austria) Horst Skoff	(Argentina) Gabriel Markus (Argentina) Hernán Gumy (Spain) Emilio Benfele Álvarez (Spain) Emilio Sánchez
22 Aug	International Championships of Croatia-Umag; Umag, Croatia; ATP World Series; Clay – $375,000 – 32S/16D; Singles – Doubles	(Uruguay) Diego Pérez (Spain) Francisco Roig; 6–2, 6–4	(Slovakia) Karol Kučera (Kenya) Paul Wekesa	(Spain) Jordi Arrese (Austria) Horst Skoff	(Argentina) Gabriel Markus (Argentina) Hernán Gumy (Spain) Emilio Benfele Álvarez (Spain) Emilio Sánchez
29 Aug; 5 Sep	US Open; New York, United States; Grand Slam; Hard – $4,100,800 – 128S/64D/32XD; Singles – Doubles – Mixed doubles	(United States) Andre Agassi; 6–1, 7–6^{(7–5)}, 7–5	(Germany) Michael Stich	(Czech Republic) Karel Nováček (United States) Todd Martin	(Peru) Jaime Yzaga (Sweden) Jonas Björkman (Austria) Thomas Muster (Germany) Bernd Karbacher
29 Aug; 5 Sep	US Open; New York, United States; Grand Slam; Hard – $4,100,800 – 128S/64D/32XD; Singles – Doubles – Mixed doubles	(Netherlands) Jacco Eltingh (Netherlands) Paul Haarhuis; 6–3, 7–6	(Australia) Todd Woodbridge (Australia) Mark Woodforde	(Czech Republic) Karel Nováček (United States) Todd Martin	(Peru) Jaime Yzaga (Sweden) Jonas Björkman (Austria) Thomas Muster (Germany) Bernd Karbacher
29 Aug; 5 Sep	US Open; New York, United States; Grand Slam; Hard – $4,100,800 – 128S/64D/32XD; Singles – Doubles – Mixed doubles	(South Africa) Elna Reinach (United States) Patrick Galbraith; 6–2, 6–4	(Czech Republic) Jana Novotná (Australia) Todd Woodbridge	(Czech Republic) Karel Nováček (United States) Todd Martin	(Peru) Jaime Yzaga (Sweden) Jonas Björkman (Austria) Thomas Muster (Germany) Bernd Karbacher

=== September ===
Week	Tournament	Champions	Runners-up	Semifinalists	Quarterfinalists
12 Sep	Romanian Open Tennis Championships; Bucharest, Romania; ATP World Series; Clay – $525,000 – 32S/16D; Singles – Doubles	(Argentina) Franco Davín; 6–2, 6–4	(Croatia) Goran Ivanišević	(Italy) Renzo Furlan (Spain) Albert Costa	(Spain) Àlex Corretja (Austria) Thomas Muster (Spain) Marcos Aurelio Gorriz (Slovakia) Karol Kučera
12 Sep	Romanian Open Tennis Championships; Bucharest, Romania; ATP World Series; Clay – $525,000 – 32S/16D; Singles – Doubles	(Australia) Wayne Arthurs (Australia) Simon Youl; 6–4, 6–4	(Spain) Jordi Arrese (Spain) José Antonio Conde	(Italy) Renzo Furlan (Spain) Albert Costa	(Spain) Àlex Corretja (Austria) Thomas Muster (Spain) Marcos Aurelio Gorriz (Slovakia) Karol Kučera
12 Sep	Grand Prix Passing Shot Bordeaux; Bordeaux, France; ATP World Series; Hard – $375,000 – 32S/16D; Singles – Doubles	(South Africa) Wayne Ferreira; 6–0, 7–5	(United States) Jeff Tarango	(Switzerland) Marc Rosset (France) Guy Forget	(France) Guillaume Raoux (France) Fabrice Santoro (France) Cédric Pioline (France) Olivier Delaître
12 Sep	Grand Prix Passing Shot Bordeaux; Bordeaux, France; ATP World Series; Hard – $375,000 – 32S/16D; Singles – Doubles	(France) Olivier Delaître (France) Guy Forget; 6–2, 2–6, 7–5	(Italy) Diego Nargiso (France) Guillaume Raoux	(Switzerland) Marc Rosset (France) Guy Forget	(France) Guillaume Raoux (France) Fabrice Santoro (France) Cédric Pioline (France) Olivier Delaître
12 Sep	Club Colombia Open; Bogotá, Colombia; ATP World Series; Clay – $288,750 – 32S/16D	(Venezuela) Nicolás Pereira; 6–3, 3–6, 6–4	(Colombia) Mauricio Hadad	(Czech Republic) Karel Nováček (Colombia) Miguel Tobón	(Brazil) Fernando Meligeni (Canada) Daniel Nestor (Chile) Sergio Cortés (Argentina) Christian Miniussi
12 Sep	Club Colombia Open; Bogotá, Colombia; ATP World Series; Clay – $288,750 – 32S/16D	(The Bahamas) Mark Knowles (Canada) Daniel Nestor; 6–4, 7–6	(United States) Luke Jensen (United States) Murphy Jensen	(Czech Republic) Karel Nováček (Colombia) Miguel Tobón	(Brazil) Fernando Meligeni (Canada) Daniel Nestor (Chile) Sergio Cortés (Argentina) Christian Miniussi
19 Sep	Davis Cup sponsored by NEC; Gothenburg, Sweden – carpet (i); Hamburg, Germany – hard	Semifinal winners Sweden 3–2; Russia 4–1	Semifinal losers United States; Germany		
26 Sep	Campionati Internazionali di Sicilia; Palermo, Italy; ATP World Series; Clay – $290,000 – 32S/16D; Singles – Doubles	(Spain) Alberto Berasategui; 2–6, 7–6^{(8–6)}, 6–4	(Spain) Àlex Corretja	(Czech Republic) Slava Doseděl (Spain) Emilio Sánchez	(Germany) Oliver Gross (Spain) Francisco Clavet (Spain) Jordi Arrese (Austria) Gilbert Schaller
26 Sep	Campionati Internazionali di Sicilia; Palermo, Italy; ATP World Series; Clay – $290,000 – 32S/16D; Singles – Doubles	(Netherlands) Tom Kempers (United States) Jack Waite; 7–6, 6–4	(United Kingdom) Neil Broad (United States) Greg Van Emburgh	(Czech Republic) Slava Doseděl (Spain) Emilio Sánchez	(Germany) Oliver Gross (Spain) Francisco Clavet (Spain) Jordi Arrese (Austria) Gilbert Schaller
26 Sep	Salem Open Kuala Lumpur; Kuala Lumpur, Malaysia; ATP World Series; Carpet (i) – $375,000 – 32S/16D	(Netherlands) Jacco Eltingh; 7–6^{(7–1)}, 2–6, 6–4	(Russia) Andrei Olhovskiy	(Germany) Alexander Mronz (Australia) Todd Woodbridge	(Japan) Shuzo Matsuoka (Italy) Gianluca Pozzi (India) Leander Paes (Malaysia) Adam Malik
26 Sep	Salem Open Kuala Lumpur; Kuala Lumpur, Malaysia; ATP World Series; Carpet (i) – $375,000 – 32S/16D	(Netherlands) Jacco Eltingh (Netherlands) Paul Haarhuis; 6–0, 7–5	(Sweden) Nicklas Kulti (Sweden) Lars-Anders Wahlgren	(Germany) Alexander Mronz (Australia) Todd Woodbridge	(Japan) Shuzo Matsuoka (Italy) Gianluca Pozzi (India) Leander Paes (Malaysia) Adam Malik
26 Sep	Davidoff Swiss Indoors; Basel, Switzerland; ATP World Series; Hard (i) – $775,000 – 32S/16D; Singles – Doubles	(South Africa) Wayne Ferreira; 4–6, 6–2, 7–6^{(9–7)}, 6–3	(United States) Patrick McEnroe	(Italy) Cristiano Caratti (France) Guy Forget	(Germany) Michael Stich (France) Lionel Roux (Switzerland) Marc Rosset (United States) Jared Palmer
26 Sep	Davidoff Swiss Indoors; Basel, Switzerland; ATP World Series; Hard (i) – $775,000 – 32S/16D; Singles – Doubles	(United States) Patrick McEnroe (United States) Jared Palmer; 6–3, 7–6	(South Africa) Lan Bale (South Africa) John-Laffnie de Jager	(Italy) Cristiano Caratti (France) Guy Forget	(Germany) Michael Stich (France) Lionel Roux (Switzerland) Marc Rosset (United States) Jared Palmer

=== October ===
Week	Tournament	Champions	Runners-up	Semifinalists	Quarterfinalists
3 Oct	Grand Prix de Tennis de Toulouse; Toulouse, France; ATP World Series; Hard (i) – $375,000 – 32S/16D; Singles – Doubles	(Sweden) Magnus Larsson; 6–1, 6–3	(United States) Jared Palmer	(Russia) Andrei Chesnokov (Germany) Bernd Karbacher	(France) Guy Forget (France) Cédric Pioline (France) Arnaud Boetsch (France) Olivier Delaître
3 Oct	Grand Prix de Tennis de Toulouse; Toulouse, France; ATP World Series; Hard (i) – $375,000 – 32S/16D; Singles – Doubles	(Netherlands) Menno Oosting (Czech Republic) Daniel Vacek; 7–6, 6–7, 6–3	(United States) Patrick McEnroe (United States) Jared Palmer	(Russia) Andrei Chesnokov (Germany) Bernd Karbacher	(France) Guy Forget (France) Cédric Pioline (France) Arnaud Boetsch (France) Olivier Delaître
3 Oct	Athens International; Athens, Greece; ATP World Series; Clay – $188,750 – 32S/16D; Singles – Doubles	(Spain) Alberto Berasategui; 4–6, 7–6^{(7–4)}, 6–3	(Spain) Óscar Martínez	(Spain) Francisco Clavet (Spain) Àlex Corretja	(South Africa) Marcos Ondruska (Spain) Javier Sánchez (Germany) Carsten Arriens (Spain) Jordi Arrese
3 Oct	Athens International; Athens, Greece; ATP World Series; Clay – $188,750 – 32S/16D; Singles – Doubles	(Argentina) Luis Lobo (Spain) Javier Sánchez; 5–7, 6–1, 6–4	(Italy) Cristian Brandi (Italy) Federico Mordegan	(Spain) Francisco Clavet (Spain) Àlex Corretja	(South Africa) Marcos Ondruska (Spain) Javier Sánchez (Germany) Carsten Arriens (Spain) Jordi Arrese
3 Oct	Australian Indoor Tennis Championships; Sydney, Australia; ATP Championship Series; Hard (i) – $895,000 – 32S/16D; Singles – Doubles	(Netherlands) Richard Krajicek; 7–6^{(7–5)}, 7–6^{(9–7)}, 2–6, 6–3	(Germany) Boris Becker	(Australia) Patrick Rafter (Australia) Mark Woodforde	(United States) Jeff Tarango (United States) Aaron Krickstein (Sweden) Nicklas Kulti (United States) Jonathan Stark
3 Oct	Australian Indoor Tennis Championships; Sydney, Australia; ATP Championship Series; Hard (i) – $895,000 – 32S/16D; Singles – Doubles	(Netherlands) Jacco Eltingh (Netherlands) Paul Haarhuis; 6–4, 7–6	(Zimbabwe) Byron Black (United States) Jonathan Stark	(Australia) Patrick Rafter (Australia) Mark Woodforde	(United States) Jeff Tarango (United States) Aaron Krickstein (Sweden) Nicklas Kulti (United States) Jonathan Stark
10 Oct	SEIKO Super Tennis; Tokyo, Japan; ATP Championship Series; Carpet (i) – $895,000 – 48S/24D; Singles – Doubles	(Croatia) Goran Ivanišević; 6–4, 6–4	(United States) Michael Chang	(Sweden) Stefan Edberg (Netherlands) Jacco Eltingh	(Netherlands) Richard Krajicek (New Zealand) Brett Steven (United States) Todd Martin (United States) Jonathan Stark
10 Oct	SEIKO Super Tennis; Tokyo, Japan; ATP Championship Series; Carpet (i) – $895,000 – 48S/24D; Singles – Doubles	(Canada) Grant Connell (United States) Patrick Galbraith; 6–3, 3–6, 6–4	(Zimbabwe) Byron Black (United States) Jonathan Stark	(Sweden) Stefan Edberg (Netherlands) Jacco Eltingh	(Netherlands) Richard Krajicek (New Zealand) Brett Steven (United States) Todd Martin (United States) Jonathan Stark
10 Oct	IPB Czech Indoor; Ostrava, Czech Republic; ATP World Series; Carpet (i) – $290,000 – 32S/16D; Singles – Doubles	(United States) MaliVai Washington; 4–6, 6–3, 6–3	(France) Arnaud Boetsch	(Czech Republic) Martin Damm (Italy) Diego Nargiso	(United Kingdom) Jeremy Bates (Denmark) Kenneth Carlsen (Sweden) Jonas Svensson (Netherlands) Jan Siemerink
10 Oct	IPB Czech Indoor; Ostrava, Czech Republic; ATP World Series; Carpet (i) – $290,000 – 32S/16D; Singles – Doubles	(Czech Republic) Martin Damm (Czech Republic) Karel Nováček; 6–4, 1–6, 6–3	(South Africa) Gary Muller (South Africa) Piet Norval	(Czech Republic) Martin Damm (Italy) Diego Nargiso	(United Kingdom) Jeremy Bates (Denmark) Kenneth Carlsen (Sweden) Jonas Svensson (Netherlands) Jan Siemerink
10 Oct	Tel Aviv Open; Tel Aviv, Israel; ATP World Series; Hard – $250,000 – 32S/16D; Singles – Doubles	(South Africa) Wayne Ferreira; 7–6^{(7–4)}, 6–3	(Israel) Amos Mansdorf	(Austria) Thomas Muster (France) Fabrice Santoro	(Sweden) Jonas Björkman (Brazil) Luiz Mattar (Russia) Andrei Cherkasov (South Africa) Marcos Ondruska
10 Oct	Tel Aviv Open; Tel Aviv, Israel; ATP World Series; Hard – $250,000 – 32S/16D; Singles – Doubles	(South Africa) Lan Bale (South Africa) John-Laffnie de Jager; 6–7, 6–2, 7–6	(Sweden) Jan Apell (Sweden) Jonas Björkman	(Austria) Thomas Muster (France) Fabrice Santoro	(Sweden) Jonas Björkman (Brazil) Luiz Mattar (Russia) Andrei Cherkasov (South Africa) Marcos Ondruska
17 Oct	CA-TennisTrophy; Vienna, Austria; ATP World Series; Carpet (i) – $375,000 – 32S/16D; Singles – Doubles	(United States) Andre Agassi; 7–6^{(7–4)}, 4–6, 6–2, 6–3	(Germany) Michael Stich	(Croatia) Goran Ivanišević (Austria) Thomas Muster	(Germany) Arne Thoms (Italy) Andrea Gaudenzi (Czech Republic) Petr Korda (Netherlands) Jan Siemerink
17 Oct	CA-TennisTrophy; Vienna, Austria; ATP World Series; Carpet (i) – $375,000 – 32S/16D; Singles – Doubles	(United States) Mike Bauer (Czech Republic) David Rikl; 7–6, 6–4	(Austria) Alex Antonitsch (Canada) Greg Rusedski	(Croatia) Goran Ivanišević (Austria) Thomas Muster	(Germany) Arne Thoms (Italy) Andrea Gaudenzi (Czech Republic) Petr Korda (Netherlands) Jan Siemerink
17 Oct	Grand Prix de Tennis de Lyon; Lyon, France; ATP World Series; Carpet (i) – $575,000 – 32S/16D; Singles – Doubles	(Switzerland) Marc Rosset; 6–4, 7–6^{(7–2)}	(United States) Jim Courier	(Ukraine) Andrei Medvedev (Russia) Andrei Chesnokov	(Australia) Patrick Rafter (South Africa) Wayne Ferreira (France) Lionel Roux (Russia) Yevgeny Kafelnikov
17 Oct	Grand Prix de Tennis de Lyon; Lyon, France; ATP World Series; Carpet (i) – $575,000 – 32S/16D; Singles – Doubles	(Switzerland) Jakob Hlasek (Russia) Yevgeny Kafelnikov; 6–7, 7–6, 7–6	(Czech Republic) Martin Damm (Australia) Patrick Rafter	(Ukraine) Andrei Medvedev (Russia) Andrei Chesnokov	(Australia) Patrick Rafter (South Africa) Wayne Ferreira (France) Lionel Roux (Russia) Yevgeny Kafelnikov
17 Oct	Salem Open Beijing; Beijing, China; ATP World Series; Carpet (i) – $295,000 – 32S/16D; Singles – Doubles	(United States) Michael Chang; 7–5, 7–5	(Sweden) Anders Järryd	(New Zealand) Brett Steven (South Africa) David Adams	(Germany) Alexander Mronz (Russia) Andrei Olhovskiy (Sweden) Tomas Nydahl (Canada) Albert Chang
17 Oct	Salem Open Beijing; Beijing, China; ATP World Series; Carpet (i) – $295,000 – 32S/16D; Singles – Doubles	(United States) Tommy Ho (United States) Kent Kinnear; 7–6, 6–3	(South Africa) David Adams (Russia) Andrei Olhovskiy	(New Zealand) Brett Steven (South Africa) David Adams	(Germany) Alexander Mronz (Russia) Andrei Olhovskiy (Sweden) Tomas Nydahl (Canada) Albert Chang
24 Oct	Stockholm Open; Stockholm, Sweden; ATP Championship Series, Single-Week; Carpet (i) – $1,470,000 – 48S/24D; Singles – Doubles	(Germany) Boris Becker; 4–6, 6–4, 6–3, 7–6^{(7–4)}	(Croatia) Goran Ivanišević	(United States) Pete Sampras (Russia) Yevgeny Kafelnikov	(Sweden) Magnus Larsson (Germany) Michael Stich (Spain) Sergi Bruguera (United States) Andre Agassi
24 Oct	Stockholm Open; Stockholm, Sweden; ATP Championship Series, Single-Week; Carpet (i) – $1,470,000 – 48S/24D; Singles – Doubles	(Australia) Todd Woodbridge (Australia) Mark Woodforde; 6–3, 6–4	(Sweden) Jan Apell (Sweden) Jonas Björkman	(United States) Pete Sampras (Russia) Yevgeny Kafelnikov	(Sweden) Magnus Larsson (Germany) Michael Stich (Spain) Sergi Bruguera (United States) Andre Agassi
24 Oct	Hellmann's Cup; Santiago, Chile; ATP World Series; Clay – $188,750 – 32S/16D; Singles – Doubles	(Spain) Alberto Berasategui; 6–3, 6–4	(Spain) Francisco Clavet	(Czech Republic) Slava Doseděl (Spain) Àlex Corretja	(Argentina) Javier Frana (Spain) Jordi Arrese (Brazil) Fernando Meligeni (Argentina) Franco Davín
24 Oct	Hellmann's Cup; Santiago, Chile; ATP World Series; Clay – $188,750 – 32S/16D; Singles – Doubles	(Czech Republic) Karel Nováček (Sweden) Mats Wilander; 4–6, 7–6, 7–6	(Spain) Tomás Carbonell (Spain) Francisco Roig	(Czech Republic) Slava Doseděl (Spain) Àlex Corretja	(Argentina) Javier Frana (Spain) Jordi Arrese (Brazil) Fernando Meligeni (Argentina) Franco Davín
31 Oct	Paris Open; Paris, France; ATP Championship Series, Single-Week; Carpet (i) – $2,000,000 – 48S/24D; Singles – Doubles	(United States) Andre Agassi; 6–3, 6–3, 4–6, 7–5	(Switzerland) Marc Rosset	(Spain) Sergi Bruguera (United States) Michael Chang	(United States) Pete Sampras (Czech Republic) Petr Korda (Germany) Boris Becker (Croatia) Goran Ivanišević
31 Oct	Paris Open; Paris, France; ATP Championship Series, Single-Week; Carpet (i) – $2,000,000 – 48S/24D; Singles – Doubles	(Netherlands) Jacco Eltingh (Netherlands) Paul Haarhuis; 3–6, 7–6, 7–5	(Zimbabwe) Byron Black (United States) Jonathan Stark	(Spain) Sergi Bruguera (United States) Michael Chang	(United States) Pete Sampras (Czech Republic) Petr Korda (Germany) Boris Becker (Croatia) Goran Ivanišević
31 Oct	Topper Open; Montevideo, Uruguay; ATP World Series; Clay – $188,750 – 32S/16D; Singles – Doubles	(Spain) Alberto Berasategui; 6–4, 6–0	(Spain) Francisco Clavet	(Austria) Gilbert Schaller (Uruguay) Marcelo Filippini	(France) Fabrice Santoro (Czech Republic) Karel Nováček (Argentina) Gabriel Markus (Romania) Adrian Voinea
31 Oct	Topper Open; Montevideo, Uruguay; ATP World Series; Clay – $188,750 – 32S/16D; Singles – Doubles	(Uruguay) Marcelo Filippini (Brazil) Luiz Mattar; 7–6, 6–4	(Spain) Sergio Casal (Spain) Emilio Sánchez	(Austria) Gilbert Schaller (Uruguay) Marcelo Filippini	(France) Fabrice Santoro (Czech Republic) Karel Nováček (Argentina) Gabriel Markus (Romania) Adrian Voinea

=== November ===
Week	Tournament	Champions	Runners-up	Semifinalists	Quarterfinalists
7 Nov	Topper South American Open; Buenos Aires, Argentina; ATP World Series; Clay – $288,750 – 32S/16D; Singles – Doubles	(Spain) Àlex Corretja; 6–3, 5–7, 7–6^{(7–5)}	(Argentina) Javier Frana	(Spain) Francisco Clavet (Czech Republic) Karel Nováček	(Spain) Alberto Berasategui (Brazil) Luiz Mattar (Czech Republic) Slava Doseděl (Spain) Juan Albert Viloca
7 Nov	Topper South American Open; Buenos Aires, Argentina; ATP World Series; Clay – $288,750 – 32S/16D; Singles – Doubles	(Spain) Sergio Casal (Spain) Emilio Sánchez; 6–3, 6–2	(Spain) Tomás Carbonell (Spain) Francisco Roig	(Spain) Francisco Clavet (Czech Republic) Karel Nováček	(Spain) Alberto Berasategui (Brazil) Luiz Mattar (Czech Republic) Slava Doseděl (Spain) Juan Albert Viloca
7 Nov	Kremlin Cup; Moscow, Russia; ATP World Series; Carpet (i) – $1,100,000 – 32S/16D; Singles – Doubles	(Russia) Alexander Volkov; 6–2, 6–4	(United States) Chuck Adams	(Netherlands) Jacco Eltingh (Switzerland) Marc Rosset	(Czech Republic) Petr Korda (Czech Republic) Daniel Vacek (Russia) Yevgeny Kafelnikov (Germany) Carl-Uwe Steeb
7 Nov	Kremlin Cup; Moscow, Russia; ATP World Series; Carpet (i) – $1,100,000 – 32S/16D; Singles – Doubles	(Netherlands) Jacco Eltingh (Netherlands) Paul Haarhuis; Walkover	(South Africa) David Adams (Russia) Andrei Olhovskiy	(Netherlands) Jacco Eltingh (Switzerland) Marc Rosset	(Czech Republic) Petr Korda (Czech Republic) Daniel Vacek (Russia) Yevgeny Kafelnikov (Germany) Carl-Uwe Steeb
7 Nov	European Community Championships; Antwerp, Belgium; ATP World Series; Carpet (i) – $1,100,000 – 32S/16D; Singles – Doubles	(United States) Pete Sampras; 7–6^{(7–5)}, 6–4	(Sweden) Magnus Larsson	(United States) Jared Palmer (France) Olivier Delaître	(Zimbabwe) Byron Black (Australia) Patrick Rafter (Sweden) Jonas Björkman (Canada) Sébastien Lareau
7 Nov	European Community Championships; Antwerp, Belgium; ATP World Series; Carpet (i) – $1,100,000 – 32S/16D; Singles – Doubles	(Sweden) Jan Apell (Sweden) Jonas Björkman; 4–6, 6–1, 6–2	(Netherlands) Hendrik Jan Davids (Canada) Sébastien Lareau	(United States) Jared Palmer (France) Olivier Delaître	(Zimbabwe) Byron Black (Australia) Patrick Rafter (Sweden) Jonas Björkman (Canada) Sébastien Lareau
14 Nov	ATP Tour World Championships Singles; Frankfurt, Germany; ATP Tour World Championships; Carpet (i) – $3,000,000 – 8S; Singles	(United States) Pete Sampras; 4–6, 6–3, 7–5, 6–4	(Germany) Boris Becker	(United States) Andre Agassi (Spain) Sergi Bruguera	(United States) Michael Chang (Spain) Alberto Berasategui (Sweden) Stefan Edberg (Croatia) Goran Ivanišević
21 Nov	ATP Tour World Championships Doubles; Jakarta, Indonesia; ATP Tour World Championships; Carpet (i) – $1,300,000 – 8D; Doubles	(Sweden) Jan Apell (Sweden) Jonas Björkman; 6–4, 4–6, 4–6, 7–6, 7–6	(Australia) Todd Woodbridge (Australia) Mark Woodforde	Semifinalists (South Africa) David Adams / (Russia) Andrei Olhovskiy (Netherlands) Jacco Eltingh / (Australia) Paul Haarhuis	
28 Nov	Davis Cup by NEC: Final; Moscow – carpet	Sweden; 4–1	Russia		

=== December ===
Week	Tournament	Champions	Runners-up	Semifinalists	Quarterfinalists
6 Dec	Grand Slam Cup; Munich, Germany; Grand Slam Cup; Carpet (i) – 16S	(Sweden) Magnus Larsson; 7–6^{(8–6)}, 4–6, 7–6^{(7–5)}, 6–4	(United States) Pete Sampras	(Croatia) Goran Ivanišević (United States) Todd Martin	(United States) Michael Chang (Germany) Boris Becker (Spain) Sergi Bruguera (United States) Andre Agassi

== ATP rankings ==
As of 10 January 1994
Rk	Name	Nation
1	Pete Sampras	USA
2	Michael Stich	GER
3	Jim Courier	USA
4	Sergi Bruguera	ESP
5	Stefan Edberg	SWE
6	Andrei Medvedev	UKR
7	Michael Chang	USA
8	Goran Ivanišević	CRO
9	Thomas Muster	AUT
10	Cédric Pioline	FRA
11	Petr Korda	CZE
12	Boris Becker	GER
13	Todd Martin	USA
14	Magnus Gustafsson	SWE
15	Richard Krajicek	NED
16	Marc Rosset	SUI
17	Alexander Volkov	RUS
18	Wayne Ferreira	RSA
19	Karel Nováček	CZE
20	Ivan Lendl	USA

Year-end rankings 1994 (26 December 1994)
Rk	Name	Nation	Points	High	Low	Change
1	Pete Sampras	USA	5097	1	1	Steady
2	Andre Agassi	USA	3249	2	32	▲22
3	Boris Becker	GER	3237	3	14	▲9
4	Sergi Bruguera	ESP	3007	3	7	Steady
5	Goran Ivanišević	CRO	2936	2	8	▲3
6	Michael Chang	USA	2647	6	9	▲1
7	Stefan Edberg	SWE	2471	3	9	▼2
8	Alberto Berasategui	ESP	2470	7	41	▲28
9	Michael Stich	GER	2380	2	9	▼7
10	Todd Martin	USA	2307	5	13	▲3
11	Yevgeny Kafelnikov	RUS	2174	11	102	▲91
12	Wayne Ferreira	RSA	2121	11	22	▲6
13	Jim Courier	USA	1909	2	14	▼10
14	Marc Rosset	SUI	1770	14	20	▲2
15	Andrei Medvedev	UKR	1655	4	15	▼9
16	Thomas Muster	AUT	1616	9	16	▼7
17	Richard Krajicek	NED	1407	15	32	▼2
18	Petr Korda	CZE	1397	11	20	▼7
19	Magnus Larsson	SWE	1331	19	49	▲20
20	Patrick Rafter	AUS	1296	20	54	▲32

== Statistical information ==
List of players and singles titles won:

- Andre Agassi – Scottsdale, Canada Masters, US Open, Vienna, Paris Masters (5)
- Jeremy Bates – Seoul (1)
- Boris Becker – Milan, Los Angeles, New Haven, Stockholm Masters (4)
- Alberto Berasategui – Nice, Stuttgart Outdoors, Umag, Palermo, Athens, Santiago, Montevideo (7)
- Sergi Bruguera – French Open, Gstaad, Prague (3)
- Michael Chang – Jakarta, Philadelphia, Hong Kong, Atlanta, Cincinnati Masters, Beijing (6)
- Àlex Corretja – Buenos Aires (1)
- Carlos Costa – Estoril, San Marino (2)
- Franco Davín – Bucharest (1)
- Stefan Edberg – Doha, Stuttgart Indoor, Washington, D.C. (3)
- Jacco Eltingh – Schenectady, Kuala Lumpur (2)
- Wayne Ferreira – Oahu, Indianapolis, Bordeaux, Basel, Tel Aviv (5)
- Marcelo Filippini – Florence (1)
- Renzo Furlan – San Jose, Casablanca (2)
- Magnus Gustafsson – Auckland, Dubai (2)
- Goran Ivanišević – Kitzbühel, Tokyo Indoor (2)
- Yevgeny Kafelnikov – Adelaide, Copenhagen, Long Island (3)
- Bernd Karbacher – Båstad (1)
- Richard Krajicek – Barcelona, Rosmalen, Sydney Indoors (3)
- Magnus Larsson – Zaragoza, Toulouse (2)
- Todd Martin – Memphis, London (2)
- Luiz Mattar – Coral Springs (1)
- Andrei Medvedev – Monte Carlo Masters, Hamburg Masters (2)
- Thomas Muster – Mexico City, Madrid, St. Poelten (3)
- Karel Nováček – Hilversum (1)
- Jared Palmer – Pinehurst (1)
- Nicolás Pereira – Bogotá (1)
- Patrick Rafter – Manchester (1)
- Marc Rosset – Marseille, Lyon (2)
- Pete Sampras – Sydney, Australian Open, Indian Wells Masters, Miami Masters, Osaka, Tokyo Outdoors, Rome Masters, Wimbledon, Antwerp, ATP World Championships (10)
- Javier Sánchez – Bologna (1)
- Michael Stich – Rotterdam, Munich, Halle (3)
- Jason Stoltenberg – Birmingham (1)
- Alexander Volkov – Moscow (1)
- MaliVai Washington – Ostrava (1)
- David Wheaton – Newport (1)
- Markus Zoecke – Sun City (1)

The following players won their first title:

- Jeremy Bates
- Àlex Corretja
- Renzo Furlan
- Yevgeny Kafelnikov
- Jared Palmer
- Nicolás Pereira
- Patrick Rafter
- Markus Zoecke

== See also ==
- 1994 WTA Tour
