= 1994 Campionati Internazionali di San Marino – Doubles =

Doubles
- 1994 Campionati Internazionali di San Marino

Final
- Champions: (United Kingdom) Neil Broad (United States) Greg Van Emburgh
- Runners-up: (Spain) Jordi Arrese (Italy) Renzo Furlan
- Score: 6–4, 7–6

Events
Singles	Doubles
← 1993 ·	Campionati Internazionali di San Marino	· 1995 →

Daniel Orsanic and Olli Rahnasto were the defending champions, but none competed this year.

Neil Broad and Greg Van Emburgh won the title by defeating Jordi Arrese and Renzo Furlan 6–4, 7–6 in the final.

== Seeds ==
1. (United States) Mark Keil / (Belgium) Libor Pimek (quarterfinals)
2. (Czech Republic) Vojtěch Flégl / (Australia) Andrew Florent (quarterfinals)
3. (Italy) Cristian Brandi / (Italy) Federico Mordegan (first round)
4. (Australia) Jon Ireland / (United States) Jack Waite (quarterfinals)

== Draw ==
=== Key ===
- Q = Qualifier
- WC = Wild card
- LL = Lucky loser
- Alt = Alternate
- SE = Special exempt
- PR = Protected ranking
- ITF = ITF entry
- JE = Junior exempt
- w/o = Walkover
- r = Retired
- d = Defaulted
- SR = Special ranking

=== Draw ===
First round
1	(United States) M Keil (Belgium) L Pimek	2	6	6
(Morocco) K Alami (Italy) D Nargiso	6	2	4
(Netherlands) S Groen (Argentina) R Saad	5	3
WC	(Spain) J Arrese (Italy) R Furlan	7	6
3	(Italy) C Brandi (Italy) F Mordegan	6	4	3
Q	(Hungary) G Köves (Hungary) L Markovits	4	6	6
(South Africa) C Ferreira (North Macedonia) A Kitinov	6	6	5
(Australia) W Arthurs (Australia) S Youl	4	7	7
(Argentina) P Arnold (Argentina) L Lobo	4	6	6
WC	(Argentina) F Davín (Australia) R Fromberg	6	4	4
(Latvia) Ģ Dzelde (Malaysia) A Malik	1	2
4	(Australia) J Ireland (United States) J Waite	6	6
WC	(Italy) O Camporese (Italy) P Canè	6	2
(United Kingdom) N Broad (United States) G Van Emburgh	7	6
(Belgium) F Dewulf (Belgium) T Vanhoudt	3	5
2	(Czech Republic) V Flégl (Australia) A Florent	6	7

Quarterfinals
1	(United States) M Keil (Belgium) L Pimek	6	3	4
WC	(Spain) J Arrese (Italy) R Furlan	3	6	6
Q	(Hungary) G Köves (Hungary) L Markovits	6	6
(Australia) W Arthurs (Australia) S Youl	2	1
(Argentina) P Arnold (Argentina) L Lobo	6	6
4	(Australia) J Ireland (United States) J Waite	1	4
(United Kingdom) N Broad (United States) G Van Emburgh	6	6
2	(Czech Republic) V Flégl (Australia) A Florent	4	4

Semifinals
WC	(Spain) J Arrese (Italy) R Furlan	7	6
Q	(Hungary) G Köves (Hungary) L Markovits	6	3
(Argentina) P Arnold (Argentina) L Lobo	6	0
(United Kingdom) N Broad (United States) G Van Emburgh	7	6

Final
WC	(Spain) J Arrese (Italy) R Furlan	4	6
(United Kingdom) N Broad (United States) G Van Emburgh	6	7
