= 1994 Campionati Internazionali di San Marino – Singles =

Singles
- 1994 Campionati Internazionali di San Marino

Final
- Champion: (Spain) Carlos Costa
- Runner-up: (Germany) Oliver Gross
- Score: 6–1, 6–3

Details
- Draw: 32 (3WC/4Q)
- Seeds: 8

Events
Singles	Doubles
← 1993 ·	Campionati Internazionali di San Marino	· 1995 →

Thomas Muster was the defending champion but chose to compete at Cincinnati in the same week, losing in the first round to Mark Woodforde.

Carlos Costa won the title by defeating Oliver Gross 6–1, 6–3 in the final.

== Seeds ==
1. (Spain) Alberto Berasategui (quarterfinals)
2. (Spain) Carlos Costa (champion)
3. (Sweden) Magnus Larsson (second round)
4. (Spain) Javier Sánchez (second round)
5. (Italy) Renzo Furlan (quarterfinals)
6. (Australia) Richard Fromberg (second round)
7. (Spain) Jordi Arrese (second round)
8. (Uruguay) Marcelo Filippini (semifinals)

== Draw ==
=== Key ===
- Q = Qualifier
- WC = Wild card
- LL = Lucky loser
- Alt = Alternate
- SE = Special exempt
- PR = Protected ranking
- ITF = ITF entry
- JE = Junior exempt
- w/o = Walkover
- r = Retired
- d = Defaulted
- SR = Special ranking

=== Finals ===
Semifinals
8	(Uruguay) Marcelo Filippini	4	7	4
(Germany) Oliver Gross	6	5	6
Q	(Belgium) Christophe Van Garsse	6^{4}	2
2/WC	(Spain) Carlos Costa	7^{7}	6

Final
(Germany) Oliver Gross	1	3
2/WC	(Spain) Carlos Costa	6	6

=== Top half ===
First round
1	(Spain) A Berasategui	3	6	6
(Norway) C Ruud	6	3	1
(France) G Solvès	7^{7}	6
(Italy) P Canè	6^{3}	2
(Spain) A Costa	3	2
(Belgium) F Dewulf	6	6
(Argentina) H Gumy	4	4
8	(Uruguay) M Filippini	6	6
4/WC	(Spain) J Sánchez	6	6
(Belgium) X Daufresne	3	4
(Germany) O Gross	6	6
Q	(Spain) G Puentes	0	1
(Sweden) L Jönsson	6	6
(Italy) D Nargiso	3	3
(Argentina) P Arnold	6^{1}	3
6	(Australia) R Fromberg	7^{7}	6

Second round
1	(Spain) A Berasategui	6	7^{9}
(France) G Solvès	4	6^{7}
(Belgium) F Dewulf	6^{2}	5
8	(Uruguay) M Filippini	7^{7}	7
4/WC	(Spain) J Sánchez	4	6^{4}
(Germany) O Gross	6	7^{7}
(Sweden) L Jönsson	6	2	7
6	(Australia) R Fromberg	4	6	5

Quarterfinals
1	(Spain) A Berasategui	6^{4}	1
8	(Uruguay) M Filippini	7^{7}	6
(Germany) O Gross	6	6
(Sweden) L Jönsson	3	1

Semifinals
8	(Uruguay) M Filippini	4	7	4
(Germany) O Gross	6	5	6

=== Bottom half ===
First round
5	(Italy) R Furlan	6	3	7^{7}
(Australia) S Youl	4	6	6^{5}
WC	(Italy) O Camporese	6	6
(Slovakia) K Kučera	4	4
Q	(Belgium) C Van Garsse	6	6
Q	(Romania) A Voinea	2	2
(Spain) F Sánchez	0	3
3	(Sweden) M Larsson	6	6
7	(Spain) J Arrese	6	4	6
(Australia) B Larkham	1	6	3
(Ukraine) D Poliakov	2	3
Q	(Spain) Á López Morón	6	6
(South Africa) D Adams	2	6	4
(Argentina) F Davín	6	3	6
(Morocco) K Alami	3	5
2/WC	(Spain) C Costa	6	7

Second round
5	(Italy) R Furlan	6	6
WC	(Italy) O Camporese	2	2
Q	(Belgium) C Van Garsse	5	7^{8}	6
3	(Sweden) M Larsson	7	6^{6}	4
7	(Spain) J Arrese	4	6^{6}
Q	(Spain) Á López Morón	6	7^{8}
(Argentina) F Davín	1	3
2/WC	(Spain) C Costa	6	6

Quarterfinals
5	(Italy) R Furlan	4	4
Q	(Belgium) C Van Garsse	6	6
Q	(Spain) Á López Morón	2	6^{4}
2/WC	(Spain) C Costa	6	7^{7}

Semifinals
Q	(Belgium) C Van Garsse	6^{4}	2
2/WC	(Spain) C Costa	7^{7}	6
