= 1994 Muratti Time Indoor =

- Date: 7–13 February
- Edition: 17th
- Category: Championship Series
- Draw: 32S / 16D
- Prize money: $688,750
- Surface: Carpet / indoor
- Location: Milan, Italy
- Venue: Assago Forum

Champions

Singles
- (Germany) Boris Becker

Doubles
- (Netherlands) Tom Nijssen / (Czech Republic) Cyril Suk
- Milan Indoor

The 1994 Muratti Time Indoor, known as such for sponsorship reasons, was an ATP men's tennis tournament played on indoor carpet courts at the Assago Forum Milan, Italy that was part of the Championship Series of the 1994 ATP Tour. It was the 17th edition of the tournament and took place from 7 February until 13 February 1994. Fifth-seeded Boris Becker won his second consecutive singles title at the event and his fourth in total and earned $112,500 first-prize money.

== Finals ==
=== Singles ===
(Germany) Boris Becker defeated (Czech Republic) Petr Korda, 6–2, 3–6, 6–3

- It was Becker's 1st singles title of the year and the 39th of his career.

=== Doubles ===
(Netherlands) Tom Nijssen / (Czech Republic) Cyril Suk defeated (Netherlands) Hendrik Jan Davids / (South Africa) Piet Norval, 4–6, 7–6, 7–6
