= 1995 ATP German Open – Singles =

Singles
- 1995 ATP German Open

Final
- Champion: (Ukraine) Andriy Medvedev
- Runner-up: (Croatia) Goran Ivanišević
- Score: 6–3, 6–2, 6–1

Details
- Draw: 56
- Seeds: 16

Events
| Singles | Doubles |
| ← 1994 · | ATP German Open | · 1996 → |

Defending champion Andriy Medvedev defeated Goran Ivanišević in the final, 6–3, 6–2, 6–1 to win the singles tennis title at the 1995 Hamburg European Open.

== Seeds ==
A champion seed is indicated in bold text while text in italics indicates the round in which that seed was eliminated.

1. (United States) Andre Agassi (quarterfinals)
2. (United States) Pete Sampras (semifinals)
3. (Germany) Boris Becker (second round)
4. (Croatia) Goran Ivanišević (final)
5. (Russia) Yevgeny Kafelnikov (second round)
6. (Spain) Alberto Berasategui (second round)
7. (Germany) Michael Stich (third round)
8. (Spain) Sergi Bruguera (semifinals)
9. (South Africa) Wayne Ferreira (quarterfinals)
10. (Netherlands) Richard Krajicek (third round, retired)
11. (Switzerland) Marc Rosset (quarterfinals)
12. (Ukraine) **Andriy Medvedev (champion)**
13. (Italy) Andrea Gaudenzi (quarterfinals)
14. (Netherlands) Jacco Eltingh (third round)
15. (Czech Republic) ~~Karel Nováček~~ (withdrew)
16. (Germany) Bernd Karbacher (first round)

== Draw ==
=== Key ===
- Q = Qualifier
- WC = Wild card
- LL = Lucky loser
- Alt = Alternate
- ITF = ITF entry
- PR = Protected ranking
- SR = Special ranking
- SE = Special exempt
- JE = Junior exempt
- JR = Junior Accelerator Programme entrant
- CO = College Accelerator Programme entrant
- NG = Next Gen Accelerator Program entrant
- w/o = Walkover
- r = Retired
- d = Defaulted

=== Finals ===
Semifinals
8 | (Spain) Sergi Bruguera | 4 | **6** | 6^{3}
4 | (Croatia) **Goran Ivanišević** | **6** | 3 | **7^{7}**
12 | (Ukraine) **Andriy Medvedev** | **6** | 2 | **6**
2/WC | (United States) Pete Sampras | 4 | **6** | 4

Final
4 | (Croatia) Goran Ivanišević | 3 | 2 | 1
12 | (Ukraine) **Andriy Medvedev** | **6** | **6** | **6**

=== Top half ===
==== Section 1 ====
First round
WC | (Germany) **M-K Goellner** | **6** | **6**
(Netherlands) P Haarhuis | 1 | 4
(Czech Republic) **S Doseděl** | **7^{7}** | **7**
Q | (Germany) T Gollwitzer | 6^{3} | 5
WC | (Germany) **D Prinosil** | **6** | 2 | **6**
16 | (Germany) B Karbacher | 3 | **6** | 4
10 | (Netherlands) **R Krajicek** | 4 | **6** | **6**
(Germany) M Zoecke | **6** | 4 | 3
(Spain) **F Clavet** | **6** | 3 | **6**
Q | (Chile) G Silberstein | 3 | **6** | 1
Q | (The Bahamas) **M Knowles** | **6** | 6^{10} | **7**
(Australia) R Fromberg | 2 | **7^{12}** | 5

Second round
1 | (United States) **A Agassi** | **6** | **7^{7}**
WC | (Germany) M-K Goellner | 2 | 6^{4}
(Czech Republic) **S Doseděl** | **6** | **6**
WC | (Germany) D Prinosil | 1 | 4
10 | (Netherlands) **R Krajicek** | **6** | **6**
(Spain) F Clavet | 3 | 3
Q | (The Bahamas) M Knowles | 2 | 3
8 | (Spain) **S Bruguera** | **6** | **6**

Third round
1 | (United States) **A Agassi** | **6** | **6**
(Czech Republic) S Doseděl | 2 | 1
10 | (Netherlands) R Krajicek | 0^{r}
8 | (Spain) **S Bruguera** | 3

Quarterfinals
1 | (United States) A Agassi | 3 | 1
8 | (Spain) **S Bruguera** | **6** | **6**

==== Section 2 ====
First round
(Spain) Á Corretja | 3 | 3
WC | (Germany) **J Renzenbrink** | **6** | **6**
Q | (Russia) A Cherkasov | 4 | 2
(Spain) **Á Costa** | **6** | **6**
(France) F Santoro | 3 | **6** | 6^{4}
14 | (Netherlands) **J Eltingh** | **6** | 3 | **7^{7}**
11 | (Switzerland) **M Rosset** | **6** | **6**
(Russia) A Volkov | 3 | 3
(Italy) **R Furlan** | **7** | **6**
(France) O Delaître | 5 | 2
WC | (Germany) **O Gross** | **6** | **7^{7}**
(Russia) A Olhovskiy | 4 | 6^{2}

Second round
4 | (Croatia) **G Ivanišević** | **6** | **6**
WC | (Germany) J Renzenbrink | 4 | 0
(Spain) Á Costa | **7** | 4 | 3
14 | (Netherlands) **J Eltingh** | 5 | **6** | **6**
11 | (Switzerland) **M Rosset** | **6** | 3 | **7**
(Italy) R Furlan | 2 | **6** | 5
WC | (Germany) **O Gross** | **6** | **6**
6 | (Spain) A Berasategui | 3 | 2

Third round
4 | (Croatia) **G Ivanišević** | **6** | **6**
14 | (Netherlands) J Eltingh | 4 | 4
11 | (Switzerland) **M Rosset** | 2 | **6** | **6**
WC | (Germany) O Gross | **6** | 4 | 2

Quarterfinals
4 | (Croatia) **G Ivanišević** | **6** | **6**
11 | (Switzerland) M Rosset | 1 | 3

=== Bottom half ===
==== Section 3 ====
First round
(Austria) H Skoff | 3 | 0
(Austria) **G Schaller** | **6** | **6**
(Russia) A Chesnokov | **7^{7}** | 2 | 3
(United States) **M Washington** | 6^{3} | **6** | **6**
Q | (Argentina) M Charpentier | 2 | 3
12 | (Ukraine) **A Medvedev** | **6** | **6**
13 | (Italy) **A Gaudenzi** | 4 | **7^{8}** | **6**
(Uruguay) M Filippini | **6** | 6^{6} | 1
(Spain) J Sánchez | 3 | **6** | 6^{4}
(Australia) **P Rafter** | **6** | 3 | **7^{7}**
(France) A Boetsch | **7^{7}** | 3 | 3
(Peru) **J Yzaga** | 6^{1} | **6** | **6**

Second round
5 | (Russia) Y Kafelnikov | 3 | 1
(Austria) **G Schaller** | **6** | **6**
(United States) M Washington | 4 | 2
12 | (Ukraine) **A Medvedev** | **6** | **6**
13 | (Italy) **A Gaudenzi** | **6** | **6**
(Australia) P Rafter | 2 | 4
(Peru) **J Yzaga** | 2 | **6** | **6**
3 | (Germany) B Becker | **6** | 2 | 3

Third round
(Austria) G Schaller | **6** | 1 | 2
12 | (Ukraine) **A Medvedev** | 1 | **6** | **6**
13 | (Italy) **A Gaudenzi** | **6** | **6**
(Peru) J Yzaga | 3 | 1

Quarterfinals
12 | (Ukraine) **A Medvedev** | **6** | **6**
13 | (Italy) A Gaudenzi | 3 | 2

==== Section 4 ====
First round
(Spain) T Carbonell | 6^{5} | 3
(Czech Republic) **P Korda** | **7^{7}** | **6**
(United States) V Spadea | **6** | 3 | 3
(Slovakia) **K Kučera** | 3 | **6** | **6**
Q | (Ukraine) D Poliakov | 2 | 3
9 | (South Africa) **W Ferreira** | **6** | **6**
LL | (Czech Republic) **D Vacek** | **6** | 5 | **6**
Q | (Spain) R Carretero | 3 | **7** | 4
(Netherlands) **J Siemerink** | **6** | 2 | **6**
(Germany) M Sinner | 4 | **6** | 2
(Spain) **C Costa** | **6** | **6**
(Germany) H Dreekmann | 1 | 3

Second round
7 | (Germany) **M Stich** | **6** | **7^{8}**
(Czech Republic) P Korda | 1 | 6^{6}
(Slovakia) K Kučera | **6** | 5 | 2
9 | (South Africa) **W Ferreira** | 3 | **7** | **6**
LL | (Czech Republic) **D Vacek** | 4
(Netherlands) J Siemerink | 1^{r}
(Spain) C Costa | 3 | 5
2/WC | (United States) **P Sampras** | **6** | **7**

Third round
7 | (Germany) M Stich | 5 | 1
9 | (South Africa) **W Ferreira** | **7** | **6**
LL | (Czech Republic) D Vacek | 2 | **6** | 2
2/WC | (United States) **P Sampras** | **6** | 3 | **6**

Quarterfinals
9 | (South Africa) W Ferreira | 2 | 2
2/WC | (United States) **P Sampras** | **6** | **6**
