= 1994 Muratti Time Indoor – Singles =

Singles
- 1994 Milan Indoor

Final
- Champion: (Germany) Boris Becker
- Runner-up: (Czech Republic) Petr Korda
- Score: 6–2, 3–6, 6–3

Details
- Draw: 32
- Seeds: 8

Events
Singles	Doubles
- Milan Indoor

Boris Becker defeated Petr Korda 6–2, 3–6, 6–3 to win the 1994 Milan Indoor singles event. Becker defended his title from 1993.

== Seeds ==
1. (Germany) Michael Stich (second round)
2. (Spain) Sergi Bruguera (semifinals)
3. (Croatia) Goran Ivanišević (quarterfinals)
4. (France) Cédric Pioline (quarterfinals)
5. (Germany) Boris Becker (champion)
6. (Czech Republic) Petr Korda (finalist)
7. (Switzerland) Marc Rosset (first round)
8. (Czech Republic) Karel Nováček (quarterfinals)

== Draws ==
=== Key ===
- Q - Qualifier
- WC - Wild Card

=== Finals ===
Semifinals					Finals
	(Haiti) R Agénor	6^{6}	1
5	(Germany) B Becker	7	6		5	(Germany) B Becker	6	3	6
6	(Czech Republic) P Korda	4	6	6	6	(Czech Republic) P Korda	2	6	3
2	(Spain) S Bruguera	6	1	4

=== Section 1 ===
First round
1	(Germany) M Stich	6	6
WC	(Italy) P Canè	4	3
(Spain) J Burillo	1	0
(Haiti) R Agénor	6	6
(New Zealand) B Steven	2	4
(Sweden) N Kulti	6	6
(Australia) W Masur	6	6^{3}	6
7	(Switzerland) M Rosset	3	7	3
4	(France) C Pioline	7	7
(South Africa) M Ondruska	5	5
WC	(Italy) O Camporese	4	6	4
(Spain) A Berasategui	6	3	6
(Israel) A Mansdorf	7	7
(Canada) G Rusedski	6^{5}	6^{3}
(France) A Boetsch	7	2	4
5	(Germany) B Becker	5	6	6

Second round
1	(Germany) M Stich	2	7	3
(Haiti) R Agénor	6	6^{3}	6
(Sweden) N Kulti	3	2
(Australia) W Masur	6	6
4	(France) C Pioline	6	4	6
(Spain) A Berasategui	3	6	2
(Israel) A Mansdorf	3	6	3
5	(Germany) B Becker	6	3	6

Quarterfinals
(Haiti) R Agénor	4	6	6
(Australia) W Masur	6	1	4
4	(France) C Pioline	2	6	2
5	(Germany) B Becker	6	4	6

Semifinals
(Haiti) R Agénor	6^{6}	1
5	(Germany) B Becker	7	6

=== Section 2 ===
First round
6	(Czech Republic) P Korda	6	7
Q	(Spain) T Carbonell	3	5
Q	(Sweden) T Högstedt	6	6
Q	(Australia) P Rafter	4	4
(Germany) MK Goellner	5	3
(Australia) J Stoltenberg	7	6
Q	(Canada) G Connell	4	4
3	(Croatia) G Ivanišević	6	6
8	(Czech Republic) K Nováček	6	7
(Australia) D Cahill	4	6^{3}
WC	(France) H Leconte	6	6
(Sweden) M Larsson	4	1
(Netherlands) J Siemerink	6	7
(Spain) C Costa	3	5
(Russia) A Volkov	2	7	1
2	(Spain) S Bruguera	6	6^{3}	6

Second round
6	(Czech Republic) P Korda	7	6
Q	(Sweden) T Högstedt	5	2
(Australia) J Stoltenberg	3	2
3	(Croatia) G Ivanišević	6	6
8	(Czech Republic) K Nováček	7	3	7
WC	(France) H Leconte	5	6	6^{2}
(Netherlands) J Siemerink	4	4
2	(Spain) S Bruguera	6	6

Quarterfinals
6	(Czech Republic) P Korda	6	4	6
3	(Croatia) G Ivanišević	4	6	2
8	(Czech Republic) K Nováček	1	0
2	(Spain) S Bruguera	6	6

Semifinals
6	(Czech Republic) P Korda	4	6	6
2	(Spain) S Bruguera	6	1	4
