= 1994 Club Colombia Open =

- Date: 12–18 September
- Edition: 1st
- Category: World Series
- Draw: 32S / 16D
- Prize money: $288,750
- Surface: Clay / outdoor
- Location: Bogotá, Colombia
- Venue: Club Campestre El Rancho

Champions

Singles
- (Venezuela) Nicolás Pereira

Doubles
- (The Bahamas) Mark Knowles / (Canada) Daniel Nestor
- Club Colombia Open

The 1994 Club Colombia Open was a men's professional tennis tournament played on outdoor clay courts at the Club Campestre El Rancho in Bogotá in Colombia and was part of the World Series category of the 1994 ATP Tour. It was the inaugural edition of the tournament and was held from 12 September through 18 September 1994. Unseeded Nicolás Pereira won the singles title.

== Finals ==
=== Singles ===
(Venezuela) Nicolás Pereira defeated (Colombia) Mauricio Hadad 6–3, 3–6, 6–4

- It was Pereira's only singles title of the year and the 1st of his career.

=== Doubles ===
(The Bahamas) Mark Knowles / (Canada) Daniel Nestor defeated (United States) Luke Jensen / (United States) Murphy Jensen 6–4, 7–6

- It was Knowles's only doubles title of the year and the 2nd of his career. It was Nestor's only doubles title of the year and the 1st of his career.
