= Oliver Gross =

German tennis player

- Country (sports): (Germany)
- Residence: Munich, Germany
- Born: 17 June 1973 (age 53) Hanau, West Germany
- Height: 1.90 m (6 ft 3 in)
- Turned pro: 1993
- Plays: Right-handed (two-handed backhand)
- Prize money: $876,452

Singles
- Career record: 49–76
- Career titles: 0
- Highest ranking: No. 60 (15 May 1995)

Grand Slam singles results
- Australian Open: 2R (1998)
- French Open: 1R (1997, 1998, 1999)
- Wimbledon: 1R (1998, 1999)
- US Open: 4R (1998)

Doubles
- Career record: 0-1
- Career titles: 0
- Highest ranking: No. 573 (9 December 2002)
- Last updated on: 3 April 2022.

Oliver Gross (born 17 June 1973) is a former professional tennis player from Germany.

== Career ==
Gross, the 1991 German Youth Champion, turned professional in 1993. The following year reached his first and only ATP Tour final, in San Marino, where he was defeated in straight sets by Carlos Costa.

He reached his highest career ranking of 60 in 1995, after reaching the quarterfinals in Munich and defeating number two Peter Sampras in Barcelona 1–6, 6–2, 6–3.

His best performance in a Grand Slam came at the 1998 US Open when he reached the round of 16. Gross came from two sets down in the opening round to beat 16th seed Albert Costa 2–6, 4–6, 7–5, 6–2, 6–4. He then accounted for dual French Open winner Sergi Bruguera 6–1, 6–3, 6–4 and in the third round had another five setter, defeating American wildcard Geoff Grant, 7–5, 6–7, 5–7, 6–3, 7–5. Playing for a spot in the quarter-final, Gross was defeated by Swede Magnus Larsson 4–6, 5–7, 7–5, 2–6.

== ATP career finals ==
=== Singles: 1 (1 runner-up) ===
Legend Grand Slam Tournaments (0–0) ATP World Tour Finals (0–0) ATP Masters Series (0–0) ATP Championship Series (0–0) ATP World Series (0–1)	Finals by surface Hard (0–0) Clay (0–1) Grass (0–0) Carpet (0–0)	Finals by setting Outdoors (0–1) Indoors (0–0)

Result	W–L	Date	Tournament	Tier	Surface	Opponent	Score
Loss	0–1	Aug 1994	San Marino, San Marino	World Series	Clay	(Spain) Carlos Costa	1–6, 3–6

== ATP Challenger and ITF Futures finals ==
=== Singles: 16 (10–6) ===
Legend ATP Challenger (10–6) ITF Futures (0–0)	Finals by surface Hard (2–1) Clay (8–5) Grass (0–0) Carpet (0–0)

Result	W–L	Date	Tournament	Tier	Surface	Opponent	Score
Win	1-0	Mar 1994	Belém, Brazil	Challenger	Hard	(Colombia) Mario Rincón	6–4, 6–4
Loss	1-1	May 1994	Dresden, Germany	Challenger	Clay	(Chile) Marcelo Ríos	7–5, 3–6, 3–6
Loss	1-2	Mar 1995	Indian Wells, United States	Challenger	Hard	(United States) Tommy Ho	7–6, 6–7, 2–6
Loss	1-3	Mar 1996	Agadir, Morocco	Challenger	Clay	(Norway) Christian Ruud	6–2, 3–6, 5–7
Loss	1-4	Aug 1996	Geneva, Switzerland	Challenger	Clay	(Argentina) Marcelo Charpentier	2–6, 1–3 ret.
Win	2-4	Mar 1997	Salinas, Ecuador	Challenger	Hard	(Austria) Gilbert Schaller	6–1, 3–6, 6–2
Loss	2-5	Apr 1997	Naples, Italy	Challenger	Clay	(Romania) Dinu-Mihai Pescariu	4–6, 2–6
Loss	2-6	Oct 1997	Lima, Peru	Challenger	Clay	(Sweden) Tomas Nydahl	6–4, 0–6, 4–6
Win	3-6	Dec 1997	Santiago, Chile	Challenger	Clay	(Argentina) Francisco Cabello	6–2, 6–2
Win	4-6	May 2000	Ljubljana, Slovenia	Challenger	Clay	(Spain) Joan Balcells	4–6, 6–1, 7–6^{(7–3)}
Win	5-6	Sep 2000	Skopje, Macedonia	Challenger	Clay	(Russia) Yuri Schukin	7–5, 6–4
Win	6-6	Jul 2001	Eisenach, Germany	Challenger	Clay	(Netherlands) Martin Verkerk	5–7, 6–2, 6–1
Win	7-6	Jul 2001	Montauban, France	Challenger	Clay	(Spain) Julián Alonso	6–0, 4–1 ret.
Win	8-6	Jul 2001	Oberstaufen, Germany	Challenger	Clay	(Austria) Oliver Marach	6–0, 6–1
Win	9-6	Apr 2002	San Remo, Italy	Challenger	Clay	(Italy) Renzo Furlan	6–4, 6–3
Win	10-6	Jul 2002	Ulm, Germany	Challenger	Clay	(Netherlands) Martin Verkerk	7–6^{(7–5)}, 4–6, 6–3

=== Doubles: 1 (0–1) ===
Legend ATP Challenger (0–1) ITF Futures (0–0)	Finals by surface Hard (0–0) Clay (0–1) Grass (0–0) Carpet (0–0)

Result	W–L	Date	Tournament	Tier	Surface	Partner	Opponents	Score
Loss	0–1	Sep 2002	Budapest, Hungary	Challenger	Clay	(Norway) Jan-Frode Andersen	(Australia) Paul Baccanello (Argentina) Sergio Roitman	4–6, 7–6^{(7–5)}, 5–6 ret.

== Performance timeline ==
Key
W	F	SF	QF	#R	RR	Q#	DNQ	A	NH

(W) winner; (F) finalist; (SF) semifinalist; (QF) quarterfinalist; (#R) rounds 4, 3, 2, 1; (RR) round-robin stage; (Q#) qualification round; (DNQ) did not qualify; (A) absent; (NH) not held; (SR) strike rate (events won / competed); (W–L) win–loss record.

=== Singles ===
Tournament	1993	1994	1995	1996	1997	1998	1999	2000	2001	2002	2003	SR	W–L	Win %
Grand Slam tournaments
Australian Open	Q1	A	1R	A	Q2	2R	1R	A	Q1	A	A	0 / 3	1–3	25%
French Open	A	A	A	Q3	1R	1R	1R	Q3	Q2	Q2	Q2	0 / 3	0–3	0%
Wimbledon	A	A	A	A	A	1R	1R	A	Q2	A	Q2	0 / 2	0–2	0%
US Open	A	1R	A	A	1R	4R	Q1	Q1	Q2	Q2	A	0 / 3	3–3	50%
Win–loss	0–0	0–1	0–1	0–0	0–2	4–4	0–3	0–0	0–0	0–0	0–0	0 / 11	4–11	27%
ATP Tour Masters 1000
Indian Wells	A	A	1R	A	A	Q2	Q2	A	A	Q1	A	0 / 1	0–1	0%
Miami	A	A	2R	A	A	1R	A	Q1	Q1	Q2	Q1	0 / 2	1–2	33%
Monte Carlo	A	1R	1R	A	A	A	A	A	A	A	A	0 / 2	0–2	0%
Hamburg	A	Q1	3R	2R	3R	2R	2R	A	A	A	Q1	0 / 5	7–5	58%
Rome	A	A	2R	A	A	A	Q1	A	A	A	A	0 / 1	1–1	50%
Win–loss	0–0	0–1	4–5	1–1	2–1	1–2	1–1	0–0	0–0	0–0	0–0	0 / 11	9–11	45%
