= Carlos Costa (tennis) =

Spanish tennis player (born 1968)

- Full name: Carles Costa Masferrer
- Country (sports): Spain
- Residence: Barcelona
- Born: 22 April 1968 (age 57) Barcelona, Spain
- Height: 1.82 m (5 ft 11 1/2 in)
- Turned pro: 1988
- Retired: 1999
- Plays: Right-handed (one-handed backhand)
- Prize money: $3,134,189

Singles
- Career record: 248–208
- Career titles: 6
- Highest ranking: No. 10 (18 May 1992)

Grand Slam singles results
- Australian Open: 3R (1993)
- French Open: 4R (1992, 1993)
- Wimbledon: 2R (1992, 1993, 1994)
- US Open: 4R (1992)

Other tournaments
- Olympic Games: 1R (1996)

Doubles
- Career record: 78–79
- Career titles: 5
- Highest ranking: No. 40 (18 September 1989)

Grand Slam doubles results
- Australian Open: 1R (1993)
- French Open: QF (1989)

Carles ("Carlos") Costa Masferrer (born 22 April 1968) is a former professional tennis player from Spain. Costa turned professional in 1988. He was among the game's leading clay court players in the early 1990s.

Costa was runner-up at the 1992 Italian Open, and reached the fourth round at that year's French Open and US Open. Additionally, Costa won the Barcelona Open, a tournament hosted by the tennis club where he grew up. In May 1992, he reached his career-high singles ranking of World No. 10. Costa retired in 1999.

In April 2006, he played in the 2006 Seniors Torneo Godó event in Barcelona, where he lost to Sergi Bruguera in the final.

Costa worked for IMG as an agent for most male Spanish tennis players (including Rafael Nadal). A few years later, Costa left IMG and created his own sports agency company with Rafael Nadal.

He is not related to his compatriot Albert Costa.

== Career finals ==
=== Singles: 13 (6 wins – 7 losses) ===
Legend Grand Slam tournaments (0–0) Tennis Masters Cup (0–0) ATP Masters Series (0–1) ATP Championship Series (1–1) ATP Tour (5–5)	Titles by surface Hard (0–0) Grass (0–0) Clay (6–7) Carpet (0–0)

Result	W/L	Date	Tournament	Surface	Opponent	Score
Win	1–0	Mar 1992	Estoril, Portugal	Clay	(Spain) Sergi Bruguera	4–6, 6–2, 6–2
Win	2–0	Apr 1992	Barcelona, Spain	Clay	(Sweden) Magnus Gustafsson	6–4, 7–6^{(7–3)}, 6–4
Loss	2–1	Apr 1992	Madrid, Spain	Clay	(Spain) Sergi Bruguera	6–7^{(6–8)}, 2–6, 2–6
Loss	2–2	May 1992	Rome, Italy	Clay	(United States) Jim Courier	6–7^{(3–7)}, 0–6, 4–6
Loss	2–3	Feb 1993	Mexico City, Mexico	Clay	(Austria) Thomas Muster	2–6, 4–6
Win	3–3	Jul 1993	Hilversum, Netherlands	Clay	(Sweden) Magnus Gustafsson	6–1, 6–2, 6–3
Win	4–3	Nov 1993	Buenos Aires, Argentina	Clay	(Spain) Alberto Berasategui	6–4, 6–4
Win	5–3	Mar 1994	Estoril, Portugal	Clay	(Ukraine) Andrei Medvedev	4–6, 7–5, 6–4
Loss	5–4	Apr 1994	Barcelona, Spain	Clay	(Netherlands) Richard Krajicek	4–6, 6–7^{(6–8)}, 2–6
Win	6–4	Aug 1994	San Marino, San Marino	Clay	(Germany) Oliver Gross	6–1, 6–3
Loss	6–5	Jun 1995	Oporto, Portugal	Clay	(Spain) Alberto Berasategui	6–3, 3–6, 4–6
Loss	6–6	Aug 1995	Umag, Croatia	Clay	(Austria) Thomas Muster	6–3, 6–7^{(5–7)}, 4–6
Loss	6–7	Jun 1996	Bologna, Italy	Clay	(Spain) Alberto Berasategui	3–6, 4–6

=== Singles performance timeline ===
Key
W	F	SF	QF	#R	RR	Q#	DNQ	A	NH

(W) winner; (F) finalist; (SF) semifinalist; (QF) quarterfinalist; (#R) rounds 4, 3, 2, 1; (RR) round-robin stage; (Q#) qualification round; (DNQ) did not qualify; (A) absent; (NH) not held; (SR) strike rate (events won / competed); (W–L) win–loss record.

Tournament	1986	1987	1988	1989	1990	1991	1992	1993	1994	1995	1996	1997	1998	1999	Career SR	Career win–loss
Grand Slam tournaments
Australian Open	NH	A	A	A	A	A	A	3R	A	A	2R	1R	1R	1R	0 / 5	3–5
French Open	A	A	A	A	A	3R	4R	4R	2R	3R	1R	2R	1R	1R	0 / 9	12–9
Wimbledon	A	A	A	A	1R	A	2R	2R	2R	A	1R	A	A	A	0 / 5	3–5
US Open	A	A	A	A	A	A	4R	3R	3R	A	1R	1R	1R	A	0 / 6	7–6
Grand Slam SR	0 / 0	0 / 0	0 / 0	0 / 0	0 / 1	0 / 1	0 / 3	0 / 4	0 / 3	0 / 1	0 / 4	0 / 3	0 / 3	0 / 2	0 / 25	N/A
Annual win–loss	0–0	0–0	0–0	0–0	0–1	2–1	7–3	8–4	4–3	2–1	1–4	1–3	0–3	0–2	N/A	25–25
ATP Masters Series
Indian Wells	Not MS1 Before 1990				A	A	2R	1R	QF	3R	QF	Q1	Q1	A	0 / 5	9–5
Key Biscayne	Not MS1 Before 1990				A	A	1R	A	2R	3R	A	1R	2R	A	0 / 5	2–5
Monte Carlo	Not MS1 Before 1990				A	A	2R	QF	2R	2R	QF	QF	1R	A	0 / 7	12–7
Rome	Not MS1 Before 1990				A	1R	F	2R	A	1R	2R	Q1	1R	A	0 / 6	7–6
Hamburg	Not MS1 Before 1990				A	A	SF	1R	QF	2R	1R	2R	1R	A	0 / 7	9–7
Canada	Not MS1 Before 1990				A	A	A	A	A	A	1R	A	A	A	0 / 1	0–1
Cincinnati	Not MS1 Before 1990				A	A	A	A	A	A	A	A	A	A	0 / 0	0–0
Stuttgart (Stockholm)	Not MS1 Before 1990				A	A	2R	3R	1R	A	A	A	A	A	0 / 3	2–3
Paris	Not MS1 Before 1990				A	A	2R	1R	1R	A	A	A	1R	A	0 / 4	0–4
Masters Series SR	N/A				0 / 0	0 / 1	0 / 7	0 / 6	0 / 6	0 / 5	0 / 5	0 / 3	0 / 5	0 / 0	0 / 38	N/A
Annual win–loss	N/A				0–0	0–1	11–7	6–6	7–6	5–5	7–5	4–3	1–5	0–0	N/A	41–38
Year-end ranking	870	638	243	201	151	55	14	26	27	31	61	56	67	470	N/A	

== Career ITF finals ==
=== Singles ===
Wins (7)

No.	Date	Tournament	Surface	Opponent	Score
1.	2 April 1990	Zaragoza, Spain	Clay	(Italy) Francesco Cancellotti	6–3, 6–4
2.	2 September 1991	Venice, Italy	Clay	(Argentina) Alberto Mancini	6–3, 7–5
3.	30 September 1991	Siracusa, Italy	Clay	(Italy) Stefano Pescosolido	6–3, 7–6
4.	14 August 1995	Graz, Austria	Clay	(Czech Republic) Jiří Novák	6–4, 6–3
5.	31 March 1997	Barletta, Italy	Clay	(Italy) Davide Sanguinetti	6–3, 6–2
6.	7 October 1997	Barcelona, Spain	Clay	(Spain) Juan Antonio Marín	6–1, 6–4
7.	17 August 1998	Graz, Austria	Clay	(Spain) Albert Portas	7–5, 7–6
