= Renzo Furlan =

Italian tennis player and coach (born 1970)

- Country (sports): Italy
- Residence: Monte Carlo, Monaco
- Born: 17 May 1970 (age 56) Conegliano, Veneto, Italy
- Height: 1.75 m (5 ft 9 in)
- Turned pro: 1988
- Retired: 2004
- Plays: Right-handed (one-handed backhand)
- Prize money: $2,449,043

Singles
- Career record: 223-239
- Career titles: 2
- Highest ranking: No. 19 (15 April 1996)

Grand Slam singles results
- Australian Open: 4R (1996)
- French Open: QF (1995)
- Wimbledon: 3R (1996)
- US Open: 3R (1995)

Other tournaments
- Grand Slam Cup: 1R (1995)
- Olympic Games: QF (1996)

Doubles
- Career record: 14–38
- Career titles: 0
- Highest ranking: No. 193 (17 June 1991)

Grand Slam doubles results
- Australian Open: 1R (1995)
- Last updated on: 9 July 2022.

Renzo Furlan (born 17 May 1970) is an Italian tennis coach and a former professional player. The right-hander reached his highest ATP singles ranking of World No. 19 in April 1996. In 2024, he was named WTA Coach of the Year.

== Career ==
Furlan represented his native country at the 1996 Summer Olympics in Atlanta, Georgia, where he was defeated in the quarterfinals by India's Leander Paes. Four years earlier, when Barcelona hosted the Summer Olympics, he reached the third round, falling to Jordi Arrese of Spain. His best performance at a Grand Slam tournament came when he got to the quarterfinals of the 1995 French Open, defeating Marcos Ondruska, David Rikl, Fernando Meligeni and Scott Draper before losing to Sergi Bruguera.

== Coaching career ==
Furlan was appointed president of the Tennis Federation of Serbia in 2016 and after leaving, Furlan began coaching Jasmine Paolini full-time in 2020, having first worked with her in 2015. He was named WTA Coach of the Year in 2024. They split in March 2025. Since April 2026 he is coaching Luca Nardi.

== Personal life ==
Began playing tennis at age 6. Played soccer until age 14. He is the youngest in the family of two brothers and one sister. His hobbies include action and spy thriller movies and reading spy novels.

== ATP career finals ==
=== Singles: 7 (2 titles, 5 runner-ups) ===
Legend Grand Slam Tournaments (0–0) ATP World Tour Finals (0–0) ATP Masters 1000 Series (0–0) ATP 500 Series (0–0) ATP 250 Series (2–5)	Finals by surface Hard (1–1) Clay (1–3) Grass (0–0) Carpet (0–1)	Finals by setting Outdoors (1–3) Indoors (1–2)

Result	W–L	Date	Tournament	Tier	Surface	Opponent	Score
Loss	0–1	May 1992	Bologna, Italy	World Series	Clay	(Brazil) Jaime Oncins	2–6, 4–6
Loss	0–2	Jun 1992	Firenze, Italy	World Series	Clay	(Austria) Thomas Muster	3–6, 6–1, 1–6
Loss	0–3	Aug 1993	San Marino, San Marino	World Series	Clay	(Austria) Thomas Muster	5–7, 5–7
Win	1–3	Feb 1994	San Jose, United States	World Series	Hard (i)	(United States) Michael Chang	3–6, 6–2, 7–5
Win	2–3	Mar 1994	Casablanca, Morocco	World Series	Clay	(Morocco) Karim Alami	6–2, 6–2
Loss	2–4	Oct 1995	Beijing, China	World Series	Hard (i)	(United States) Michael Chang	5–7, 3–6
Loss	2–5	Mar 1997	St. Petersburg, Russia	World Series	Carpet (i)	(Sweden) Thomas Johansson	3–6, 4–6

=== Doubles: 1 (1 runner-up) ===
Legend Grand Slam Tournaments (0–0) ATP World Tour Finals (0–0) ATP Masters 1000 Series (0–0) ATP 500 Series (0–0) ATP 250 Series (0–1)	Finals by surface Hard (0–0) Clay (0–1) Grass (0–0) Carpet (0–0)	Finals by setting Outdoors (0–1) Indoors (0–0)

Result	W–L	Date	Tournament	Tier	Surface	Partner	Opponents	Score
Loss	0–1	Aug 1994	San Marino, San Marino	World Series	Clay	(Spain) Jordi Arrese	(United Kingdom) Neil Broad (United States) Greg Van Emburgh	2–6, 4–6

== ATP Challenger and ITF Futures finals ==
=== Singles: 7 (3–4) ===
Legend ATP Challenger (3–4) ITF Futures (0–0)	Finals by surface Hard (0–0) Clay (3–4) Grass (0–0) Carpet (0–0)

Result	W–L	Date	Tournament	Tier	Surface	Opponent	Score
Win	1–0	Jul 1990	Tampere, Finland	Challenger	Clay	(Spain) Fernando Luna	6–3, 6–3
Loss	1–1	Jun 1992	Turin, Italy	Challenger	Clay	(Argentina) Franco Davin	6–7, 6–3, 1–6
Win	2–1	Sep 1998	Budapest, Hungary	Challenger	Clay	(Belgium) Christophe Van Garsse	6–2, 6–3
Win	3–1	Aug 2001	Bressanone, Italy	Challenger	Clay	(Italy) Alessio Di Mauro	6–3, 6–1
Loss	3–2	Mar 2002	Barletta, Italy	Challenger	Clay	(Spain) Sergi Bruguera	6–3, 6–7^{(5–7)}, 6–7^{(5–7)}
Loss	3–3	Apr 2002	San Remo, Italy	Challenger	Clay	(Germany) Oliver Gross	4–6, 3–6
Loss	3–4	Jun 2003	Sassuolo, Italy	Challenger	Clay	(Spain) Mariano Albert-Ferrando	6–7^{(1–7)}, 3–6

=== Doubles: 4 (2–2) ===
Legend ATP Challenger (2–2) ITF Futures (0–0)	Finals by surface Hard (1–0) Clay (1–2) Grass (0–0) Carpet (0–0)

Result	W–L	Date	Tournament	Tier	Surface	Partner	Opponents	Score
Win	1–0	Jun 1991	Turin, Italy	Challenger	Clay	(Italy) Omar Camporese	(United States) Sven Salumaa (Sweden) Tobias Svantesson	7–5, 3–6, 6–4
Win	2–0	Sep 1991	Messina, Italy	Challenger	Hard	(Argentina) Guillermo Perez-Roldan	(Sweden) Jan Apell (Germany) Markus Naewie	6–4, 6–2
Loss	2–1	Mar 2002	Barletta, Italy	Challenger	Clay	(Italy) Uros Vico	(Italy) Massimo Bertolini (Italy) Cristian Brandi	6–4, 3–6, 6–7^{(4–7)}
Loss	2–2	Apr 2002	San Remo, Italy	Challenger	Clay	(Italy) Cristian Brandi	(Italy) Daniele Bracciali (Italy) Giorgio Galimberti	3–6, 4–6

== Performance timeline ==
Key
W	F	SF	QF	#R	RR	Q#	DNQ	A	NH

(W) winner; (F) finalist; (SF) semifinalist; (QF) quarterfinalist; (#R) rounds 4, 3, 2, 1; (RR) round-robin stage; (Q#) qualification round; (DNQ) did not qualify; (A) absent; (NH) not held; (SR) strike rate (events won / competed); (W–L) win–loss record.

=== Singles ===
Tournament	1989	1990	1991	1992	1993	1994	1995	1996	1997	1998	1999	2000	2001	2002	2003	SR	W–L	Win %
Grand Slam tournaments
Australian Open	A	Q2	1R	1R	A	1R	3R	4R	3R	1R	A	A	A	A	2R	0 / 8	8–8	50%
French Open	1R	A	1R	1R	2R	1R	QF	3R	1R	Q3	Q3	Q3	Q1	Q2	Q2	0 / 8	7–8	47%
Wimbledon	A	A	1R	A	A	1R	1R	3R	2R	A	A	A	A	A	A	0 / 5	3–5	38%
US Open	A	A	A	1R	2R	1R	3R	1R	1R	A	A	A	A	A	A	0 / 6	3–6	33%
Win–loss	0–1	0–0	0–3	0–3	2–2	0–4	8–4	7–4	3–4	0–1	0–0	0–0	0–0	0–0	1–1	0 / 27	21–27	44%
Olympic Games
Summer Olympics	Not Held			3R	Not Held			QF	Not Held			A	Not Held			0 / 2	5–2	71%
ATP Masters Series
Indian Wells	A	A	2R	A	1R	A	1R	3R	A	A	A	A	A	A	A	0 / 4	3–4	43%
Miami	A	A	1R	A	2R	A	2R	3R	A	A	A	A	A	A	A	0 / 4	3–4	43%
Monte Carlo	A	A	1R	2R	1R	1R	1R	2R	2R	Q1	Q2	Q1	Q1	A	A	0 / 7	3–7	30%
Hamburg	A	A	3R	3R	2R	2R	2R	A	1R	A	A	A	A	A	A	0 / 6	7–6	54%
Rome	A	2R	2R	2R	1R	2R	2R	1R	1R	1R	A	1R	A	A	A	0 / 10	5–10	33%
Canada	A	A	A	A	A	A	A	2R	A	A	A	A	A	A	A	0 / 1	1–1	50%
Cincinnati	A	A	A	A	A	A	QF	1R	A	A	A	A	A	A	A	0 / 2	3–2	60%
Paris	A	A	A	A	A	2R	1R	1R	A	A	A	A	A	A	A	0 / 3	1–3	25%
Win–loss	0–0	1–1	4–5	4–3	2–5	3–4	6–7	5–7	1–3	0–1	0–0	0–1	0–0	0–0	0–0	0 / 37	26–37	41%

Awards
Preceded by (Poland) Tomasz Wiktorowski	WTA Coach of the Year; 2024	Succeeded by Incumbent
