= 1993 Campionati Internazionali di San Marino =

- Date: 9–15 August
- Edition: 5th
- Category: World Series
- Draw: 32S / 16D
- Prize money: $275,000
- Surface: Clay / outdoor
- Location: City of San Marino, San Marino

Champions

Singles
- (Austria) Thomas Muster

Doubles
- (Argentina) Daniel Orsanic / (Finland) Olli Rahnasto
- Campionati Internazionali di San Marino

The 1993 Campionati Internazionali di San Marino was a men's tennis tournament played on outdoor clay courts at the Centro Tennis Cassa di Risparmio di Fonte dell'Ovo in the City of San Marino in San Marino and was part of the World Series of the 1993 ATP Tour. It was the fifth edition of the tournament and was held from 9 August until 15 August 1993. First-seeded Thomas Muster won the singles title.

== Finals ==
=== Singles ===
(Austria) Thomas Muster defeated (Italy) Renzo Furlan 7–5, 7–5

- It was Muster's 5th title of the year and the 18th of his career.

=== Doubles ===
(Argentina) Daniel Orsanic / (Finland) Olli Rahnasto defeated (Argentina) Juan Garat / (Argentina) Roberto Saad 6–4, 1–6, 6–3

== See also ==
- 1993 San Marino Open – women's tournament
