= 1998 Internazionali di Carisbo =

- Date: 8–14 June
- Edition: 14th
- Category: International Series
- Draw: 32S / 16D
- Prize money: $315,000
- Surface: Clay / outdoor
- Location: Bologna, Italy
- Venue: Cierrebi Club

Champions

Singles
- (Spain) Julián Alonso

Doubles
- (United States) Brandon Coupe / (South Africa) Paul Rosner
← 1997 ·	Bologna Outdoor

The 1998 Internazionali di Carisbo was a men's tennis tournament played on outdoor clay courts at the Cierrebi Club in Bologna, Italy that was part of the International Series of the 1998 ATP Tour. It was the fourteenth and final edition of the tournament and was held from 8 June until 14 June 1998. Third-seeded Julián Alonso won the singles title.

== Finals ==
=== Singles ===
(Spain) Julián Alonso defeated (Morocco) Karim Alami, 6–1, 6–4.

=== Doubles ===
(United States) Brandon Coupe / (South Africa) Paul Rosner defeated (Italy) Giorgio Galimberti / (Italy) Massimo Valeri, 7–6, 6–3.
