= 1998 Internazionali di Carisbo – Doubles =

Doubles
- 1998 Internazionali di Carisbo

Final
- Champions: (United States) Brandon Coupe (South Africa) Paul Rosner
- Runners-up: (Italy) Giorgio Galimberti (Italy) Massimo Valeri
- Score: 7–6, 6–3

Events
Singles	Doubles
← 1997 ·	Internazionali di Carisbo

The 1998 Internazionali di Carisbo was a men's tennis tournament played on Clay in Bologna, Italy that was part of the International Series of the 1998 ATP Tour. It was the fourteenth edition of the tournament and was held from 8–14 June 1998.

== Seeds ==
Champion seeds are indicated in bold text while text in italics indicates the round in which those seeds were eliminated.

1. (United States) **Brandon Coupe** / (South Africa) **Paul Rosner (champions)**
2. (Czech Republic) Libor Pimek / (Belgium) Tom Vanhoudt (first round)
3. (Italy) Cristian Brandi / (Italy) Filippo Messori (first round)
4. (Argentina) Mariano Hood / (Czech Republic) Tomáš Anzari (first round)

== Draw ==
=== Key ===
- Q = Qualifier
- WC = Wild card
- LL = Lucky loser
- Alt = Alternate
- ITF = ITF entry
- PR = Protected ranking
- SR = Special ranking
- SE = Special exempt
- JE = Junior exempt
- JR = Junior Accelerator Programme entrant
- CO = College Accelerator Programme entrant
- NG = Next Gen Accelerator Program entrant
- w/o = Walkover
- r = Retired
- d = Defaulted

=== Finals ===
First round
1	(United States) **B Coupe** **(South Africa) P Rosner**	**6**	**6**
(Spain) Á Calatrava (Slovakia) D Hrbatý	2	3
(Australia) **J Holmes** **(Finland) T Ketola**	0	**7**	**7**
(Italy) M Bertolini (United States) D Bowen	**6**	6	6
(Morocco) **K Alami** **(Hungary) G Köves**	**6**	**6**
3	(Italy) C Brandi (Italy) F Messori	3	4
(Spain) **J Antonio Conde** **(Spain) J Sánchez**	**6**	**6**
(Spain) J Alonso (Spain) A Berasategui	2	3
(Argentina) **H Gumy** **(Argentina) M Puerta**	**6**	**6**
(Italy) M Martelli (Italy) D Scala	3	2
(Italy) **M Ardinghi** **(Italy) D Sanguinetti**	**6**	3	**6**
4	(Argentina) M Hood (Czech Republic) T Anzari	4	**6**	3
(Portugal) **E Couto** **(Portugal) J Cunha e Silva**	**6**	**6**
(France) J-P Fleurian (United States) J Waite	1	1
(Italy) **G Galimberti** **(Italy) M Valeri**	**6**	**6**
2	(Czech Republic) L Pimek (Belgium) T Vanhoudt	3	4

Quarterfinals
1	(United States) **B Coupe** **(South Africa) P Rosner**	**6**	**6**
(Australia) J Holmes (Finland) T Ketola	4	4
(Morocco) **K Alami** **(Hungary) G Köves**	**6**	6	**6**
(Spain) J Antonio Conde (Spain) J Sánchez	2	**7**	3
(Argentina) H Gumy (Argentina) M Puerta	4	3
(Italy) **M Ardinghi** **(Italy) D Sanguinetti**	**6**	**6**
(Portugal) E Couto (Portugal) J Cunha e Silva	**6**	5	3
(Italy) **G Galimberti** **(Italy) M Valeri**	1	**7**	**6**

Semifinals
1	(United States) **B Coupe** **(South Africa) P Rosner**	**6**	**6**
(Morocco) K Alami (Hungary) G Köves	3	4
(Italy) M Ardinghi (Italy) D Sanguinetti	2	**6**	5
(Italy) **G Galimberti** **(Italy) M Valeri**	**6**	2	**7**

Final
1	(United States) **B Coupe** **(South Africa) P Rosner**	**7**	**6**
(Italy) G Galimberti (Italy) M Valeri	6	3
