= 1997 Internazionali di Carisbo – Doubles =

Doubles
- 1997 Internazionali di Carisbo

Final
- Champions: (Brazil) Gustavo Kuerten (Brazil) Fernando Meligeni
- Runners-up: (United States) Dave Randall (United States) Jack Waite
- Score: 6–2, 7–5

Details
- Draw: 16 (3WC/1Q)
- Seeds: 4

Events
Singles	Doubles
← 1996 ·	Bologna Outdoor	· 1998 →

Brent Haygarth and Christo van Rensburg were defending champions, but van Rensburg did not compete this year. Haygarth teamed up with Greg Van Emburgh and lost in the first round to Patrik Fredriksson and Tom Vanhoudt.

Gustavo Kuerten and Fernando Meligeni won the title by defeating Dave Randall and Jack Waite 6–2, 7–5 in the final.

== Seeds ==
1. (United States) Donald Johnson / (United States) Francisco Montana (semifinals)
2. (Netherlands) Menno Oosting / (Belgium) Libor Pimek (semifinals)
3. (United States) Dave Randall / (United States) Jack Waite (final)
4. (Brazil) Gustavo Kuerten / (Brazil) Fernando Meligeni (champions)

== Draw ==
=== Key ===
- Q = Qualifier
- WC = Wild card
- LL = Lucky loser
- Alt = Alternate
- SE = Special exempt
- PR = Protected ranking
- ITF = ITF entry
- JE = Junior exempt
- w/o = Walkover
- r = Retired
- d = Defaulted
- SR = Special ranking

=== Draw ===
First round
1	(United States) D Johnson (United States) F Montana	4	6	6
WC	(Italy) F Mordegan (Italy) D Scala	6	3	1
(South Africa) B Haygarth (United States) G Van Emburgh	6	2	3
(Sweden) P Fredriksson (Belgium) T Vanhoudt	4	6	6
4	(Brazil) G Kuerten (Brazil) F Meligeni	6	6
Q	(Argentina) M Charpentier (Mexico) D Roditi	3	4
(Spain) J Alonso (Hungary) G Köves	6	6
(United States) D DiLucia (The Bahamas) R Smith	2	3
(Spain) A Berasategui (Spain) J Burillo	7	1	2
(Italy) A Gaudenzi (Ecuador) N Lapentti	5	6	6
WC	(Spain) J Díaz (Spain) F Mantilla	2	1
3	(United States) D Randall (United States) J Waite	6	6
(United States) D Bowen (United States) K Kinnear	6	5	6
WC	(Morocco) K Alami (Morocco) H Arazi	4	7	3
(Portugal) J Cunha e Silva (South Africa) JL de Jager	4	7	1
2	(Netherlands) M Oosting (Belgium) L Pimek	6	6	6

Quarterfinals
1	(United States) D Johnson (United States) F Montana	6	6
(Sweden) P Fredriksson (Belgium) T Vanhoudt	0	3
4	(Brazil) G Kuerten (Brazil) F Meligeni	w/o
(Spain) J Alonso (Hungary) G Köves
(Italy) A Gaudenzi (Ecuador) N Lapentti	4	3
3	(United States) D Randall (United States) J Waite	6	6
(United States) D Bowen (United States) K Kinnear	5	2
2	(Netherlands) M Oosting (Belgium) L Pimek	7	6

Semifinals
1	(United States) D Johnson (United States) F Montana	4	4
4	(Brazil) G Kuerten (Brazil) F Meligeni	6	6
3	(United States) D Randall (United States) J Waite	6	6
2	(Netherlands) M Oosting (Belgium) L Pimek	0	1

Final
4	(Brazil) G Kuerten (Brazil) F Meligeni	6	7
3	(United States) D Randall (United States) J Waite	2	5
