= 1997 Internazionali di Carisbo – Singles =

Singles
- 1997 Internazionali di Carisbo

Final
- Champion: (Spain) Félix Mantilla
- Runner-up: (Brazil) Gustavo Kuerten
- Score: 4–6, 6–2, 6–1

Details
- Draw: 32 (3WC/4Q)
- Seeds: 8

Events
Singles	Doubles
← 1996 ·	Bologna Outdoor	· 1998 →

Alberto Berasategui was the defending champion, but lost in quarterfinals to tournament runner-up Gustavo Kuerten.

Félix Mantilla won the title by defeating Gustavo Kuerten 4–6, 6–2, 6–1 in the final.

== Seeds ==
1. (Spain) Alberto Berasategui (quarterfinals)
2. (Spain) Félix Mantilla (champion)
3. (Spain) Javier Sánchez (second round)
4. (Norway) Casper Ruud (first round)
5. (Morocco) Hicham Arazi (quarterfinals)
6. (Morocco) Karim Alami (semifinals)
7. (Argentina) Hernán Gumy (first round)
8. (Brazil) Gustavo Kuerten (final)

== Draw ==
=== Key ===
- Q = Qualifier
- WC = Wild card
- LL = Lucky loser
- Alt = Alternate
- SE = Special exempt
- PR = Protected ranking
- ITF = ITF entry
- JE = Junior exempt
- w/o = Walkover
- r = Retired
- d = Defaulted
- SR = Special ranking

=== Finals ===
Semifinals
8	(Brazil) Gustavo Kuerten	6	6
(Italy) Marzio Martelli	1	2
6	(Morocco) Karim Alami	3	2
2/WC	(Spain) Félix Mantilla	6	6

Final
8	(Brazil) Gustavo Kuerten	6	2	1
2/WC	(Spain) Félix Mantilla	4	6	6

=== Top half ===
First round
1	(Spain) A Berasategui	6	6
(Austria) G Schaller	1	1
(Spain) A Portas	6	3	7^{7}
(Spain) E Benfele Álvarez	4	6	6^{1}
(Sweden) P Fredriksson	5	1
Q	(Spain) J Díaz	7	6
(Argentina) M Charpentier	1	3
8	(Brazil) G Kuerten	6	6
3	(Spain) J Sánchez	6	6
Q	(Belgium) C van Garsse	4	4
(Italy) M Martelli	4	7^{7}	6
(France) T Champion	6	6^{5}	1
(Germany) O Gross	6	6
Q	(Spain) A Martín	2	3
WC	(Italy) O Camporese	3	2
5	(Morocco) H Arazi	6	6

Second round
1	(Spain) A Berasategui	6	6
(Spain) A Portas	2	3
Q	(Spain) J Díaz	4	2
8	(Brazil) G Kuerten	6	6
3	(Spain) J Sánchez	4	6	2
(Italy) M Martelli	6	4	6
(Germany) O Gross	6	1	3
5	(Morocco) H Arazi	1	6	6

Quarterfinals
1	(Spain) A Berasategui	3	7^{7}	5
8	(Brazil) G Kuerten	6	6^{1}	7
(Italy) M Martelli	2	6	6
5	(Morocco) H Arazi	6	3	4

Semifinals
8	(Brazil) G Kuerten	6	6
(Italy) M Martelli	1	2

=== Bottom half ===
First round
6	(Morocco) K Alami	6	6
(Romania) D Pescariu	3	1
(Belgium) J Van Herck	4	5
Q	(Spain) Q Muñoz	6	7
(Spain) G Blanco	5	4
(Italy) A Gaudenzi	7	6
(Argentina) F Squillari	6	6
4	(Norway) C Ruud	1	4
7	(Argentina) H Gumy	4	6^{5}
WC	(Italy) D Scala	6	7^{7}
(Spain) C Costa	4	1^{r}
(Ecuador) N Lapentti	6	3
(Spain) R Carretero	3	4
(Brazil) F Meligeni	6	6
(Spain) M Górriz	6	3	4
2/WC	(Spain) F Mantilla	4	6	6

Second round
6	(Morocco) K Alami	3	6	6
Q	(Spain) Q Muñoz	6	0	3
(Italy) A Gaudenzi	4	6	7^{9}
(Argentina) F Squillari	6	4	6^{7}
WC	(Italy) D Scala	7^{9}	4	3
(Ecuador) N Lapentti	6^{7}	6	6
(Brazil) F Meligeni	7^{7}	5	2
2/WC	(Spain) F Mantilla	6^{3}	7	6

Quarterfinals
6	(Morocco) K Alami	3	6	6
(Italy) A Gaudenzi	6	3	3
(Ecuador) N Lapentti	6	4	3
2/WC	(Spain) F Mantilla	4	6	6

Semifinals
6	(Morocco) K Alami	3	2
2/WC	(Spain) F Mantilla	6	6
