= 1998 Internazionali di Carisbo – Singles =

Singles
- 1998 Internazionali di Carisbo

Final
- Champion: (Spain) Julián Alonso
- Runner-up: (Morocco) Karim Alami
- Score: 6–1, 6–4

Details
- Draw: 32
- Seeds: 8

Events
Singles	Doubles
← 1997 ·	Internazionali di Carisbo

The 1998 Internazionali di Carisbo was a men's tennis tournament played on Clay in Bologna, Italy that was part of the International Series of the 1998 ATP Tour. It was the fourteenth edition of the tournament and was held from 8–14 June 1998.

== Seeds ==
Champion seeds are indicated in bold text while text in italics indicates the round in which those seeds were eliminated.

1. (Spain) Alberto Berasategui (first round, retired)
2. (Spain) Francisco Clavet (first round)
3. (Spain) **Julián Alonso (champion)**
4. (Spain) Galo Blanco (first round)
5. (Spain) Carlos Costa (quarterfinals)
6. (Morocco) Karim Alami (final)
7. (Brazil) Fernando Meligeni (first round)
8. (Slovakia) Dominik Hrbatý (semifinals)

== Draw ==
=== Key ===
- Q = Qualifier
- WC = Wild card
- LL = Lucky loser
- Alt = Alternate
- ITF = ITF entry
- PR = Protected ranking
- SR = Special ranking
- SE = Special exempt
- JE = Junior exempt
- JR = Junior Accelerator Programme entrant
- CO = College Accelerator Programme entrant
- NG = Next Gen Accelerator Program entrant
- w/o = Walkover
- r = Retired
- d = Defaulted

=== Finals ===
Semifinals
(Costa Rica) Juan Antonio Marín	5	3
3	**(Spain) Julián Alonso**	**7**	**6**
6	**(Morocco) Karim Alami**	1	**7**	**7**
8	(Slovakia) Dominik Hrbatý	**6**	6^{1}	5

Final
3	**(Spain) Julián Alonso**	**6**	**6**
6	(Morocco) Karim Alami	1	4

=== Top half ===
First round
**(Argentina) H Gumy**	**7**	6^{4}	3
1	(Spain) A Berasategui	5	**7**	0R
**(Costa Rica) JA Marín**	**6**	**7**
(Finland) T Ketola	4	6^{3}
**(Argentina) M Puerta**	**6**	**6**
(Belgium) Van Herck	3	2
**(Spain) E Benfele Álvarez**	**7**	**6**
7	(Brazil) F Meligeni	5	3
3	**(Spain) J Alonso**	**6**	**6**
(Spain) P Imaz	4	4
**(Spain) Á Calatrava**	**6**	**7**
(Portugal) E Couto	3	5
**(Germany) O Gross**	**6**	**6**
(Spain) F Vicente	4	3
5	**(Spain) C Costa**	**6**	**6**
(Germany) M Craca	4	4

Second round
(Argentina) H Gumy	4	2
**(Costa Rica) JA Marín**	**6**	**6**
**(Argentina) M Puerta**	5	**7**	**6**
(Spain) E Benfele Álvarez	**7**	6^{6}	3
3	**(Spain) J Alonso**	**6**	**7**
(Spain) Á Calatrava	2	6^{1}
(Germany) O Gross	2	2
5	**(Spain) C Costa**	**6**	**6**

Quarterfinals
**(Costa Rica) JA Marín**	**6**	**6**
(Argentina) M Puerta	1	3
3	**(Spain) J Alonso**	**6**	**7**
5	(Spain) C Costa	3	6^{6}

Semifinals
(Costa Rica) JA Marín	5	3
3	**(Spain) J Alonso**	**7**	**6**

=== Bottom half ===
First round
6	**(Morocco) K Alami**	**6**	**6**
(Spain) D Sánchez	4	2
**(Italy) D Sanguinetti**	**7**	**6**
(Spain) A Portas	6^{8}	2
**(Spain) JA Viloca-Puig**	**6**	**6**
(Spain) Ó Serrano	3	2
**(Italy) M Martelli**	**7**	6^{5}	**6**
4	(Spain) G Blanco	5	**7**	4
8	**(Slovakia) D Hrbatý**	**6**	4	**6**
(Spain) J Sánchez	4	**6**	3
**(Spain) J Diaz**	**6**	**6**
(Russia) A Chesnokov	3	1
**(Italy) D Scala**	**6**	**6**
(Italy) S Pescosolido	3	1
**(Argentina) F Squillari**	**6**	4	**6**
2	(Spain) F Clavet	3	**6**	0

Second round
6	**(Morocco) K Alami**	**7**	**6**
(Italy) D Sanguinetti	6^{1}	4
(Spain) JA Viloca-Puig	3	3
**(Italy) M Martelli**	**6**	**6**
8	**(Slovakia) D Hrbatý**	**7**	**6**
(Spain) J Diaz	6^{1}	1
(Italy) D Scala	3	3
**(Argentina) F Squillari**	**6**	**6**

Quarterfinals
6	**(Morocco) K Alami**	**6**	**6**
(Italy) M Martelli	4	4
8	**(Slovakia) D Hrbatý**	**7**	**6**
(Argentina) F Squillari	5	4

Semifinals
6	**(Morocco) K Alami**	1	**7**	**7**
8	(Slovakia) D Hrbatý	**6**	6^{1}	5
