= 1997 Internazionali di Carisbo =

- Date: 9–15 June
- Edition: 13th
- Category: World Series
- Draw: 32S / 16D
- Prize money: $303,000
- Surface: Clay / outdoor
- Location: Bologna, Italy
- Venue: Cierrebi Club

Champions

Singles
- (Spain) Félix Mantilla

Doubles
- (Brazil) Gustavo Kuerten / (Brazil) Fernando Meligeni
← 1996 ·	Bologna Outdoor	· 1998 →

The 1997 Internazionali di Carisbo was a men's tennis tournament played on clay courts at the Cierrebi Club in Bologna in Italy and was part of the World Series of the 1997 ATP Tour. It was the 13th edition of the tournament and was held from 9 June through 15 June 1997. Second-seeded Félix Mantilla won the singles title.

== Singles main-draw entrants ==
=== Seeds ===
Country	Player	Ranking^{1}	Seed
ESP	Alberto Berasategui	13	1
ESP	Félix Mantilla	14	2
ESP	Javier Sánchez	42	3
NOR	Christian Ruud	46	4
MAR	Hicham Arazi	55	5
MAR	Karim Alami	61	6
ARG	Hernán Gumy	64	7
BRA	Gustavo Kuerten	66	8

- ^{1} Rankings as of May 26, 1997.

=== Other entrants ===
The following players received wildcards into the main draw:

- (Italy) Davide Scala
- (Spain) Félix Mantilla
- (Italy) Omar Camporese

The following players received entry from the qualifying draw:

- (Spain) Alberto Martín
- (Belgium) Christophe Van Garsse
- (Spain) Quino Muñoz
- (Spain) Jacobo Díaz

== Finals ==
=== Singles ===
(Spain) Félix Mantilla defeated (Brazil) Gustavo Kuerten 4–6, 6–2, 6–1.

- It was Mantilla' 1st title of the year and the 2nd of his career.

=== Doubles ===
(Brazil) Gustavo Kuerten / (Brazil) Fernando Meligeni defeated (United States) Dave Randall / (United States) Jack Waite 6–2, 7–5.

- It was Kuerten' 2nd title of the year and the 3rd of his career. It was Meligeni's 2nd title of the year and the 5th of his career.
