= 2001 French Open – Men's singles =

Men's singles
- 2001 French Open

Final
- Champion: (Brazil) Gustavo Kuerten
- Runner-up: (Spain) Àlex Corretja
- Score: 6–7^{(3–7)}, 7–5, 6–2, 6–0
- Date: 10 June 2001

Details
- Draw: 128
- Seeds: 16

Events
Singles	men	women		boys	girls
Doubles	men	women	mixed	boys	girls
WC Singles	men	women	quad
WC Doubles	men	women	quad
Legends	−45	45+	women
- French Open

Defending champion Gustavo Kuerten defeated Àlex Corretja in the final, 6–7^{(3–7)}, 7–5, 6–2, 6–0 to win the men's singles tennis title at the 2001 French Open. It was his third French Open title and his third and last major title overall. Kuerten saved a match point en route to the title, against Michael Russell in the fourth round.

This tournament marked the first time that future world No. 1 and 20-time major champion Roger Federer reached a major quarterfinal. He would go on to win the title eight years later.

This was the last major to feature only 16 seeds.

== Seeds ==
1. (Brazil) Gustavo Kuerten (champion)
2. (Russia) Marat Safin (third round)
3. (United States) Andre Agassi (quarterfinals)
4. (Spain) Juan Carlos Ferrero (semifinals)
5. (United States) Pete Sampras (second round)
6. (Australia) Lleyton Hewitt (quarterfinals)
7. (Russia) Yevgeny Kafelnikov (quarterfinals)
8. (Australia) Pat Rafter (first round)

9. (Sweden) Magnus Norman (first round)
10. (France) Sébastien Grosjean (semifinals)
11. (United Kingdom) Tim Henman (third round)
12. (France) Arnaud Clément (first round)
13. (Spain) Àlex Corretja (final)
14. (Sweden) Thomas Enqvist (fourth round)
15. (United States) Jan-Michael Gambill (first round)
16. (Argentina) Franco Squillari (fourth round)

Click on the seed number of a player to go to their draw section.

== Draw ==
Key

- Q = Qualifier
- WC = Wild card
- LL = Lucky loser
- Alt = Alternate
- ITF = ITF entry
- PR = Protected ranking
- SR = Special ranking
- SE = Special exempt
- JE = Junior exempt
- JR = Junior Accelerator Programme entrant
- CO = College Accelerator Programme entrant
- NG = Next Gen Accelerator Program entrant
- w/o = Walkover
- r = Retired
- d = Defaulted

=== Finals ===
Quarterfinals
1	(Brazil) Gustavo Kuerten	6	3	7^{7}	6
7	(Russia) Yevgeny Kafelnikov	1	6	6^{3}	4
4	(Spain) Juan Carlos Ferrero	6	6	6
6	(Australia) Lleyton Hewitt	4	2	1
10	(France) Sébastien Grosjean	1	6	6	6
3	(United States) Andre Agassi	6	1	1	3
(Switzerland) Roger Federer	5	4	5
13	(Spain) Àlex Corretja	7	6	7

Semifinals
1	(Brazil) Gustavo Kuerten	6	6	6
4	(Spain) Juan Carlos Ferrero	4	4	3
10	(France) Sébastien Grosjean	6^{2}	4	4
13	(Spain) Àlex Corretja	7^{7}	6	6

Final
1	(Brazil) Gustavo Kuerten	6^{3}	7	6	6
13	(Spain) Àlex Corretja	7^{7}	5	2	0

=== Top half ===
==== Section 1 ====
First round
1	(Brazil) G Kuerten	6	7	6
(Argentina) G Coria	1	5	4
Q	(Netherlands) J van Lottum	3	0	4
(Argentina) A Calleri	6	6	6
(Morocco) K Alami	6^{5}	6	6^{4}	6	6
(Italy) D Sanguinetti	7^{7}	1	7^{7}	4	1
(Zimbabwe) B Black	1	1	4
(Israel) H Levy	6	6	6
WC	(France) M Llodra	6	7^{7}	2	4	3
(Spain) S Bruguera	3	6^{4}	6	6	6
Q	(United States) M Russell	6	6	6
WC	(France) N Mahut	2	3	2
(Belgium) X Malisse	6	6	6
(Chile) N Massú	3	1	1
Q	(Denmark) K Pless	4	6	6	7
15	(United States) J-M Gambill	6	2	4	5

Second round
1	(Brazil) G Kuerten	6	6	6
(Argentina) A Calleri	4	4	4
(Morocco) K Alami	6	0
(Israel) H Levy	4	0^{r}
(Spain) S Bruguera	6	7	3	0^{r}
Q	(United States) M Russell	4	5	6	0
(Belgium) X Malisse	4
Q	(Denmark) K Pless	0^{r}

Third round
1	(Brazil) G Kuerten	6	6^{3}	7^{7}	6
(Morocco) K Alami	3	7^{7}	6^{5}	2
Q	(United States) M Russell	3	6	6	1	6
(Belgium) X Malisse	6	4	1	6	4

Fourth round
1	(Brazil) G Kuerten	3	4	7^{7}	6	6
Q	(United States) M Russell	6	6	6^{3}	3	1

==== Section 2 ====
First round
12	(France) A Clément	6^{3}	6	6^{5}	6	7
(Argentina) M Puerta	7^{7}	3	7^{7}	1	9
(Spain) F Mantilla	6	1	3	3
(Czech Republic) B Ulihrach	3	6	6	6
(Spain) T Robredo	7	7	7^{11}
(Netherlands) R Sluiter	5	5	6^{9}
(Belarus) V Voltchkov	7^{9}	5	7^{7}	5	2
WC	(France) J-R Lisnard	6^{7}	7	6^{0}	7	6
(Slovakia) D Hrbatý	7^{7}	5	7^{7}	2	8
(Argentina) G Gaudio	6^{5}	7	6^{1}	6	6
(Switzerland) M Rosset	2	6	3	4
(Belgium) O Rochus	6	2	6	6
(United States) T Martin	3	6^{6}	6	1
LL	(Philippines) C Mamiit	6	7^{8}	2	6
LL	(Italy) F Luzzi	3	3	4
7	(Russia) Y Kafelnikov	6	6	6

Second round
(Argentina) M Puerta	6	3	3	3
(Czech Republic) B Ulihrach	2	6	6	6
(Spain) T Robredo	6	6	6
WC	(France) J-R Lisnard	3	3	0
(Slovakia) D Hrbatý	6	4	4	4
(Belgium) O Rochus	2	6	6	6
LL	(Philippines) C Mamiit	6^{3}	6	3	6^{2}
7	(Russia) Y Kafelnikov	7^{7}	3	6	7^{7}

Third round
(Czech Republic) B Ulihrach	2	2	2
(Spain) T Robredo	6	6	6
(Belgium) O Rochus	6^{1}	4	3
7	(Russia) Y Kafelnikov	7^{7}	6	6

Fourth round
(Spain) T Robredo	3	4	6	4
7	(Russia) Y Kafelnikov	6	6	1	6

==== Section 3 ====
First round
4	(Spain) JC Ferrero	6	6	6
(Austria) S Koubek	2	2	3
(Croatia) I Ljubičić	6	6	5	6^{7}	8
Q	(South Africa) M Ondruska	2	2	7	7^{9}	10
Q	(Spain) J Díaz	3	7^{8}	6	6
(Russia) M Youzhny	6	6^{6}	1	1
WC	(France) C Saulnier	6	2	6	5	4
Q	(Chile) F González	2	6	1	7	6
(France) A Di Pasquale	6	7^{7}	4	0	4
(Czech Republic) J Novák	1	6^{5}	6	6	6
(France) C Pioline	2	6	7^{7}	7^{7}
(Romania) A Pavel	6	4	6^{1}	6^{4}
(Sweden) M Gustafsson	3	2	3
(Argentina) J Acasuso	6	6	6
(Australia) A Ilie	4	1	6	3
14	(Sweden) T Enqvist	6	6	2	6

Second round
4	(Spain) JC Ferrero	6	6	6
Q	(South Africa) M Ondruska	2	2	0
Q	(Spain) J Díaz	3	7	6	6
Q	(Chile) F González	6	5	3	4
(Czech Republic) J Novák	2	6	6	7
(France) C Pioline	6	4	2	5
(Argentina) J Acasuso	6	3	4	5
14	(Sweden) T Enqvist	4	6	6	7

Third round
4	(Spain) JC Ferrero	6	6^{2}	6	6
Q	(Spain) J Díaz	1	7^{7}	1	2
(Czech Republic) J Novák	2	3	7^{7}	6	6
14	(Sweden) T Enqvist	6	6	6^{5}	2	8

Fourth round
4	(Spain) JC Ferrero	6	6	6
14	(Sweden) T Enqvist	2	4	2

==== Section 4 ====
First round
11	(United Kingdom) T Henman	6	6	5	6
Q	(Germany) T Behrend	1	4	7	0
(Netherlands) S Schalken	6	6	6
(United States) P Goldstein	1	3	2
(Czech Republic) J Vaněk	6	6^{5}	5	3
(Spain) A Martín	4	7^{7}	7	6
(Argentina) G Cañas	6	6	6
(Belgium) C Rochus	4	3	1
(United States) A Roddick	6	6	6
WC	(Australia) S Draper	2	4	4
(Germany) A Popp	3	3	1
(United States) M Chang	6	6	6
(Sweden) J Björkman	3	2	3
Q	(Russia) N Davydenko	6	6	6
WC	(France) P-H Mathieu	6^{2}	6	3	2
6	(Australia) L Hewitt	7^{7}	4	6	6

Second round
11	(United Kingdom) T Henman	6	6	6
(Netherlands) S Schalken	4	2	2
(Spain) A Martín	2	6	2	6	4
(Argentina) G Cañas	6	4	6	2	6
(United States) A Roddick	5	6	6	6^{5}	7
(United States) M Chang	7	3	4	7^{7}	5
Q	(Russia) N Davydenko	0	1	3
6	(Australia) L Hewitt	6	6	6

Third round
11	(United Kingdom) T Henman	6	4	4	6	5
(Argentina) G Cañas	4	6	6	3	7
(United States) A Roddick	7^{8}	4	2^{r}
6	(Australia) L Hewitt	6^{6}	6	2

Fourth round
(Argentina) G Cañas	6	7^{7}	2	3	3
6	(Australia) L Hewitt	3	6^{3}	6	6	6

=== Bottom half ===
==== Section 5 ====
First round
5	(United States) P Sampras	6	4	6	3	8
Q	(France) C Kauffmann	3	6	2	6	6
(Germany) R Schüttler	6	6^{1}	4	6^{8}
(Spain) G Blanco	1	7^{7}	6	7^{10}
(Germany) D Prinosil	7	2	4	5
(Germany) L Burgsmüller	5	6	6	7
(Morocco) Y El Aynaoui	6^{4}	6	6	6^{4}	6
(Ukraine) A Medvedev	7^{7}	0	2	7^{7}	3
(France) A Dupuis	2	6	6	7^{7}
(France) N Escudé	6	0	3	6^{2}
(Germany) T Haas	6	6	6
(France) J Golmard	0	1	1
WC	(France) N Thomann	6^{6}	6	7^{7}	2	4
Q	(Norway) JF Andersen	7^{8}	0	6^{5}	6	6
(Czech Republic) M Tabara	3	6	3	6^{3}
10	(France) S Grosjean	6	3	6	7^{7}

Second round
5	(United States) P Sampras	6^{4}	3	2
(Spain) G Blanco	7^{7}	6	6
(Germany) L Burgsmüller	7	6	7
(Morocco) Y El Aynaoui	5	4	5
(France) A Dupuis	6	6	6
(Germany) T Haas	4	0	3
Q	(Norway) JF Andersen	2	2	2
10	(France) S Grosjean	6	6	6

Third round
(Spain) G Blanco	7	6	6
(Germany) L Burgsmüller	5	2	3
(France) A Dupuis	4	6	6	4	2
10	(France) S Grosjean	6	2	3	6	6

Fourth round
(Spain) G Blanco	3	4	1
10	(France) S Grosjean	6	6	6

==== Section 6 ====
First round
16	(Argentina) F Squillari	6	6	6
(Netherlands) J Siemerink	4	2	1
Q	(Costa Rica) JA Marín	6	5	1	6	3
(Sweden) A Vinciguerra	3	7	6	2	6
PR	(Czech Republic) M Damm	6	3	3	4
(Russia) A Stoliarov	3	6	6	6
(United States) C Woodruff	1	4	4
Q	(Spain) A Montañés	6	6	6
(Czech Republic) S Doseděl	6^{3}	1	1
(Ecuador) N Lapentti	7^{7}	6	6
(Switzerland) M Kratochvil	1	2^{r}
(Brazil) F Meligeni	6	3
(Spain) A Costa	2	7	7^{7}	4	5
(France) J Boutter	6	5	6^{5}	6	7
(Sweden) T Johansson	2	3	6^{5}
3	(United States) A Agassi	6	6	7^{7}

Second round
16	(Argentina) F Squillari	2	6	6	6
(Sweden) A Vinciguerra	6	3	3	1
(Russia) A Stoliarov	2	3	2
Q	(Spain) A Montañés	6	6	6
(Ecuador) N Lapentti	0	1	3
(Brazil) F Meligeni	6	6	6
(France) J Boutter	3	2	2
3	(United States) A Agassi	6	6	6

Third round
16	(Argentina) F Squillari	6	6	5	6
Q	(Spain) A Montañés	3	3	7	3
(Brazil) F Meligeni	3	6	1	3
3	(United States) A Agassi	6	2	6	6

Fourth round
16	(Argentina) F Squillari	6	2	4	6	0
3	(United States) A Agassi	4	6	6	1	6

==== Section 7 ====
First round
8	(Australia) P Rafter	6	6	3	6^{5}	1
(Australia) W Arthurs	4	2	6	7^{7}	6
(Spain) J Balcells	6	1	4	6	8
(Germany) N Kiefer	2	6	6	3	6
(South Africa) W Ferreira	6	4	6	4	1
(Chile) M Ríos	3	6	3	6	6
(Italy) G Pozzi	3	3	5
WC	(France) N Coutelot	6	6	7
Q	(Italy) S Galvani	3	3	3
(Switzerland) R Federer	6	6	6
(Armenia) S Sargsian	6	3
Q	(Norway) C Ruud	1	1^{r}
(Spain) C Moyá	6	6	6
Q	(Spain) F López	1	4	0
(Spain) D Sánchez	4	4	7^{7}	6	6
9	(Sweden) M Norman	6	6	6^{4}	1	2

Second round
(Australia) W Arthurs	7^{7}	6	6
(Spain) J Balcells	6^{4}	4	4
(Chile) M Ríos	3	4	4
WC	(France) N Coutelot	6	6	6
(Switzerland) R Federer	4	3	6	6	9
(Armenia) S Sargsian	6	6	2	4	7
(Spain) C Moyá	6	1	6^{7}	7^{7}	2
(Spain) D Sánchez	1	6	7^{9}	6^{5}	6

Third round
(Australia) W Arthurs	7^{7}	6^{5}	7^{7}	7^{7}
WC	(France) N Coutelot	6^{5}	7^{7}	6^{5}	6^{4}
(Switzerland) R Federer	6	6	1	6
(Spain) D Sánchez	4	3	6	3

Fourth round
(Australia) W Arthurs	6	3	4	2
(Switzerland) R Federer	3	6	6	6

==== Section 8 ====
First round
13	(Spain) À Corretja	2	7^{7}	6	4	6
(Argentina) M Zabaleta	6	6^{3}	3	6	1
(Germany) J Knippschild	6	6	4	2	8
(Spain) F Vicente	4	2	6	6	6
(Germany) D Elsner	4	4	6	1
(Morocco) H Arazi	6	6	2	6
(Belarus) M Mirnyi	4	2	7	6^{3}
PR	(Sweden) M Larsson	6	6	5	7^{7}
(Spain) A Portas	4	5	1
(United Kingdom) G Rusedski	6	7	6
Q	(Germany) M-K Goellner	3	4	6^{5}
(France) F Santoro	6	6	7^{7}
(Spain) F Clavet	6	5	0	3
(Spain) Á Calatrava	4	7	6	6
(Austria) M Hipfl	3	3	7^{8}	1
2	(Russia) M Safin	6	6	6^{6}	6

Second round
13	(Spain) À Corretja	6	7	6
(Germany) J Knippschild	3	5	3
(Morocco) H Arazi	4	6	6	3	4
PR	(Sweden) M Larsson	6	3	2	6	6
(United Kingdom) G Rusedski	1	7^{7}	3	5
(France) F Santoro	6	6^{4}	6	7
(Spain) Á Calatrava	3	6	3	7^{7}	3
2	(Russia) M Safin	6	3	6	6^{4}	6

Third round
13	(Spain) À Corretja	6	6	6
PR	(Sweden) M Larsson	0	3	4
(France) F Santoro	6	6	4	0	6
2	(Russia) M Safin	4	4	6	6	1

Fourth round
13	(Spain) À Corretja	6	6	6
(France) F Santoro	2	3	4

Preceded by 2001 Australian Open – Men's singles	Grand Slam men's singles	Succeeded by 2001 Wimbledon Championships – Men's singles
