= Budapest Challenger (May) =

Defunct tennis tournament
- Tour: ATP Challenger Series
- Founded: 1994
- Abolished: 2005
- Location: Budapest, Hungary
- Venue: Római Teniszakadémia
- Category: ATP Challenger Tour
- Surface: Clay (red)
- Draw: 32S/32Q/16D
- Prize money: $25,000+H

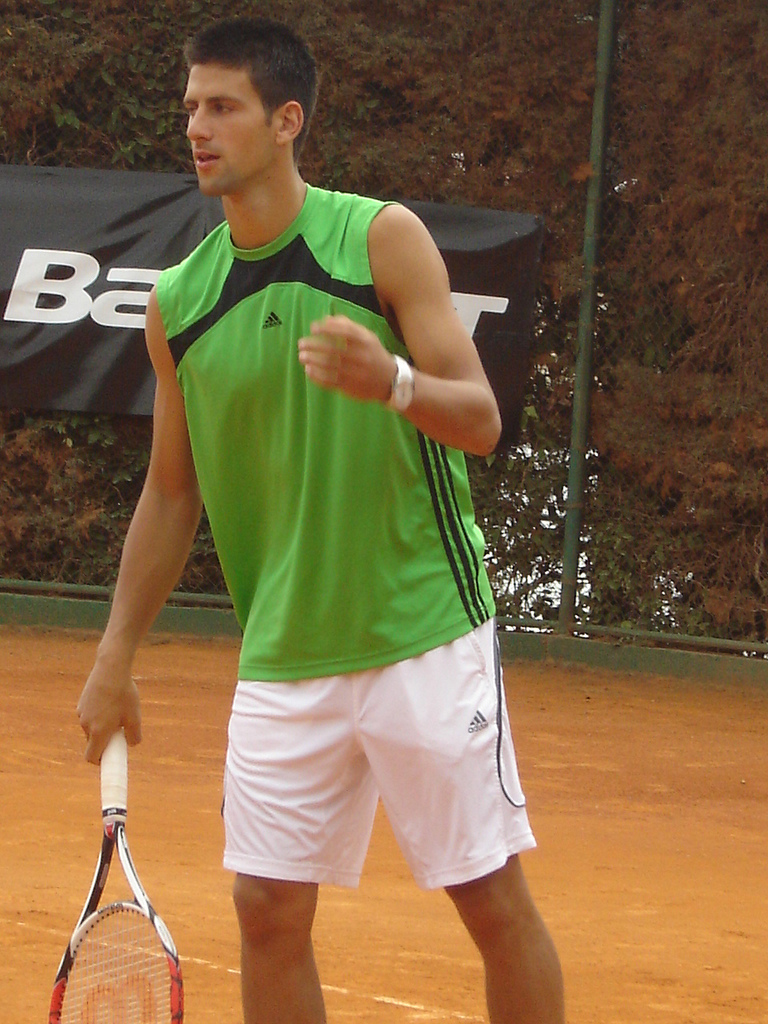
Former World No. 1 Novak Djokovic won the tournament in 2004, which was his first career title

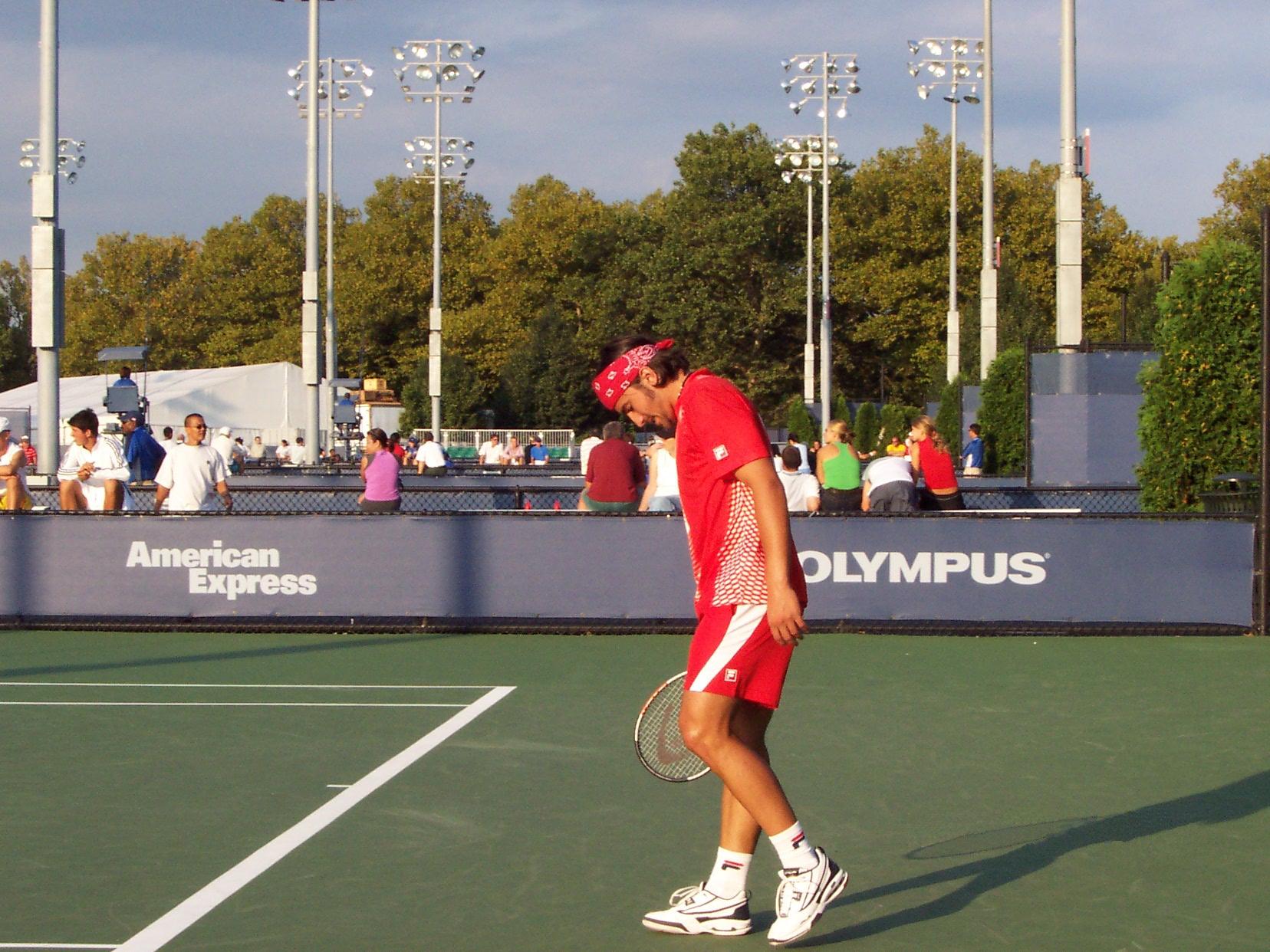
Serbia's Janko Tipsarević reached the semifinals in 2005

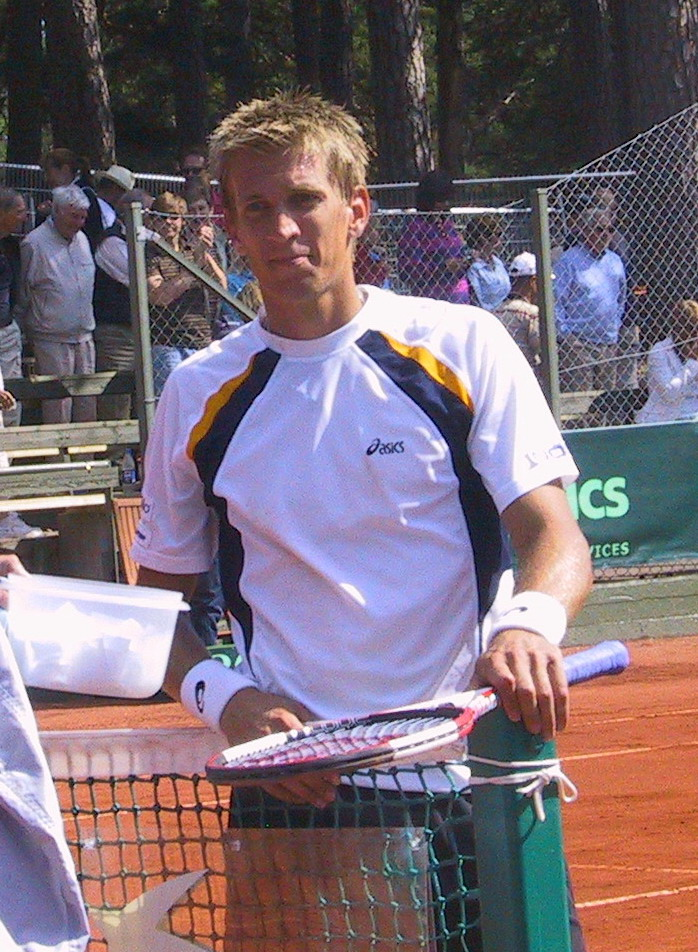
Jarkko Nieminen was a runner-up in 2001

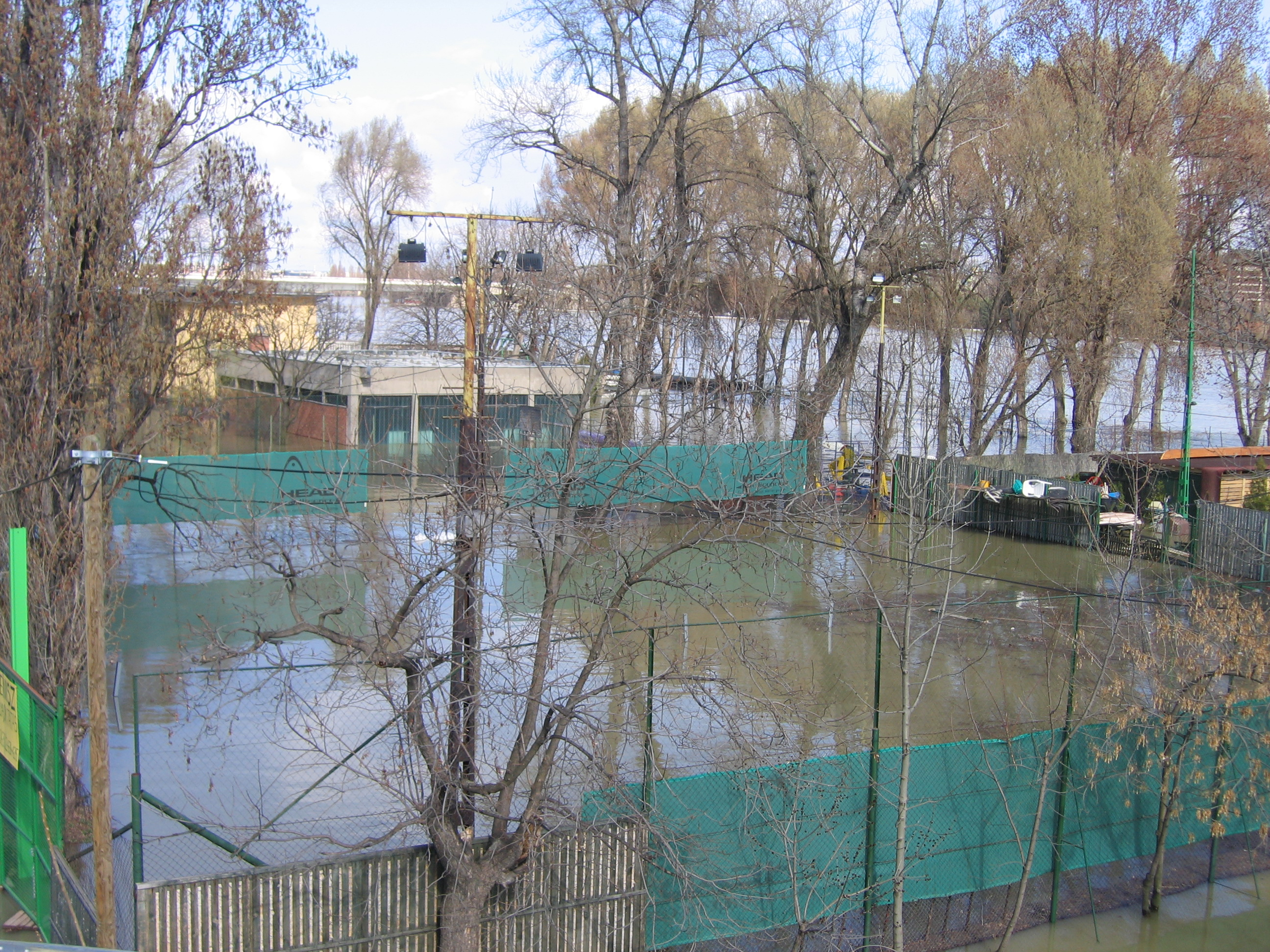
Flooded courts in 2006

The Budapest Challenger was a professional tennis tournament played on outdoor red clay courts. It was the earlier one of the two simultaneous challengers played in Hungary with the event taking place usually in May. It was part of the Association of Tennis Professionals (ATP) Challenger Tour. It was held annually at the Római Teniszakadémia in Budapest, Hungary, from 1994 to 2005, when during the 2006 Hungarian floodings the courts were washed away and the event spot was replaced by the USTA LA Tennis Open. The most successful players were Hernán Gumy with two singles titles and Nuno Marques with three doubles titles.

== Past finals ==
=== Singles ===
Year	Champion	Runner-up	Score
2005	(Romania) Răzvan Sabău	(Switzerland) Jean-Claude Scherrer	6–1, 6–7^{(3–7)}, 6–3
2004	(Serbia and Montenegro) Novak Djokovic	(Italy) Daniele Bracciali	6–1, 6–2
2003	(Sweden) Johan Settergren	(Serbia and Montenegro) Boris Pašanski	7–5, 6–4
2002	(Argentina) Mariano Delfino	(Spain) Quino Muñoz	6–3, 6–7^{(5–7)}, 6–1
2001	(Italy) Giorgio Galimberti	(Finland) Jarkko Nieminen	6–4, 5–7, 6–1
2000	(Netherlands) Edwin Kempes	(France) Jérôme Golmard	6–4 retired
1999	Not held		
1998	(South Africa) Marcos Ondruska	(Italy) Davide Sanguinetti	4–6, 7–5, 7–6^{(7–2)}
1997	(Australia) Steven Randjelovic	(Spain) Quino Muñoz	4–6, 6–3, 6–0
1996	(Argentina) Hernán Gumy	(Morocco) Karim Alami	2–6, 6–2, 6–3
1995	(Czech Republic) Jiří Novák	(Spain) Félix Mantilla Botella	6–1, 2–6, 6–2
1994	(Argentina) Hernán Gumy	(United States) Francisco Montana	6–4, 6–2

=== Doubles ===
Year	Champions	Runners-up	Score
2005	(Australia) Stephen Huss (Sweden) Johan Landsberg	(Israel) Amir Hadad (Israel) Harel Levy	7–6^{(7–4)}, 6–1
2004	(Hungary) Kornél Bardóczky (Hungary) Gergely Kisgyörgy	(Italy) Daniele Bracciali (Italy) Manuel Jorquera	6–4, 6–2
2003	(Hungary) Kornél Bardóczky (Hungary) Gergely Kisgyörgy	(United States) Thomas Blake (United States) Jason Marshall	7–6^{(7–4)}, 6–0
2002	(Slovakia) Karol Beck (Czech Republic) Jaroslav Levinský	(Argentina) Mariano Hood (Argentina) Sebastián Prieto	3–6, 6–4, 6–1
2001	(Brazil) Daniel Melo (Argentina) Sergio Roitman	(Australia) Jordan Kerr (South Africa) Damien Roberts	6–2, 6–4
2000	(Japan) Thomas Shimada (South Africa) Myles Wakefield	(Georgia (country)) Irakli Labadze (Romania) Dinu Pescariu	6–2, 3–6, 6–3
1999	Not held		
1998	(South Africa) Chris Haggard (South Africa) Paul Rosner	(Argentina) Diego del Río (Australia) Grant Silcock	6–4, 6–2
1997	(Portugal) Nuno Marques (Belgium) Tom Vanhoudt	(North Macedonia) Aleksandar Kitinov (United States) Greg Van Emburgh	2–6, 6–4, 6–3
1996	(Portugal) Nuno Marques (Belgium) Tom Vanhoudt	(Israel) Eyal Ran (Italy) Laurence Tieleman	6–4, 6–1
1995	(Argentina) Pablo Albano (Netherlands) Hendrik Jan Davids	(United States) Matt Lucena (Sweden) Rikard Bergh	6–4, 6–4
1994	(Portugal) Nuno Marques (Portugal) João Cunha e Silva	(Hungary) Gábor Köves (Hungary) László Markovits	6–, 6–4, 7–6

== See also ==
- Budapest Grand Prix
- Stella Artois Clay Court Championships
- Budapest Challenger (September)
