= Kris Goossens =

Belgian tennis player

- Country (sports): Belgium
- Residence: Groot-Bijgaarden, Belgium
- Born: 20 February 1974 (age 51); Uccle, Belgium
- Height: 1.75 m (5 ft 9 in)
- Turned pro: 1993
- Plays: Right-handed
- Prize money: $316,648

Singles
- Career record: 9–30
- Career titles: 0; 5 Challenger, 2 Futures
- Highest ranking: No. 90 (8 July 1996)

Grand Slam singles results
- Australian Open: 1R (1996, 1997)
- French Open: 2R (1996)
- Wimbledon: 1R (1996)
- US Open: 1R (1995, 1996)

Doubles
- Career record: 0–0
- Career titles: 0; 2 Challenger, 3 Futures
- Highest ranking: No. 183 (8 June 1998)

Kris Goossens (born 20 February 1974) is a former professional tennis player from Belgium.

== Career ==
Goossens entered into the ATP's top 100 for the first time in 1995, after making the semi-final of the Swedish Open and winning a Challenger event in Ecuador. His run to the semi-finals in Sweden including a win over world number 24 Jonas Björkman.

Also that year, he played two Davis Cup singles rubbers for Belgium, against the Russian team. He lost both of his matches, to Yevgeny Kafelnikov and Andrei Chesnokov.

He entered the main draw of seven Grand Slams but only once reached the second round. That occurred at the 1996 French Open, where he defeated Tim Henman. In the following round he lost to Guy Forget, in a five set match.

== ATP Challenger and ITF Futures finals ==
=== Singles: 13 (7–6) ===
Legend ATP Challenger (5–4) ITF Futures (2–2)	Finals by surface Hard (0–1) Clay (7–5) Grass (0–0) Carpet (0–0)

Result	W–L	Date	Tournament	Tier	Surface	Opponent	Score
Win	1-0	Jun 1994	Fürth, Germany	Challenger	Clay	(Germany) Dirk Dier	6–7, 6–3, 6–2
Win	2-0	Sep 1994	Budapest, Hungary	Challenger	Clay	(Norway) Christian Ruud	4–6, 6–3, 6–2
Loss	2-1	Feb 1995	Mar del Plata, Argentina	Challenger	Clay	(Czech Republic) Jiří Novák	2–6, 6–3, 3–6
Win	3-1	May 1995	Dresden, Germany	Challenger	Clay	(Sweden) Magnus Gustafsson	6–4, 5–7, 7–5
Win	4-1	Oct 1995	Guayaquil, Ecuador	Challenger	Clay	(Germany) Dirk Dier	6–4, 6–4
Loss	4-2	Feb 1996	Punta del Este, Uruguay	Challenger	Clay	(Spain) Félix Mantilla	2–6, 6–7
Win	5-2	Jul 1996	Ulm, Germany	Challenger	Clay	(Morocco) Karim Alami	6–4, 6–0
Loss	5-3	Jul 1996	Ostend, Belgium	Challenger	Clay	(France) Thierry Champion	3–6, 4–6
Loss	5-4	Jan 1999	USA F2, Miami	Futures	Hard	(United States) Bob Bryan	2–6, 5–7
Win	6-4	Mar 1999	Italy F1, Sassari	Futures	Clay	(Italy) Filippo Volandri	6–1, 1–6, 6–4
Win	7-4	May 2000	USA F13, Boca Raton	Futures	Clay	(Colombia) Mauricio Hadad	6–3, 7–5
Loss	7-5	Jul 2000	France F12, Toulon	Futures	Clay	(Japan) Jun Kato	3–6, 4–6
Loss	7-6	Aug 2000	Manerbio, Italy	Challenger	Clay	(Italy) Stefano Tarallo	3–6, 4–6

=== Doubles: 8 (5–3) ===
Legend ATP Challenger (2–3) ITF Futures (3–0)	Finals by surface Hard (1–0) Clay (4–3) Grass (0–0) Carpet (0–0)

Result	W–L	Date	Tournament	Tier	Surface	Partner	Opponents	Score
Loss	0–1	May 1992	Antwerp, Belgium	Challenger	Clay	(Sweden) Mikael Pernfors	(Australia) Michael Brown (Australia) Roger Rasheed	2–6, 4–6
Win	1–1	Jul 1997	Ulm, Germany	Challenger	Clay	(Belgium) Tom Vanhoudt	(Czech Republic) Petr Luxa (Czech Republic) Petr Pála	6–3, 6–0
Win	2–1	Jul 1997	Ostend, Belgium	Challenger	Clay	(Belgium) Tom Vanhoudt	(France) Tarik Benhabiles (France) Julien Boutter	3–6, 6–4, 6–0
Loss	2–2	Oct 1997	Lima, Peru	Challenger	Clay	(Venezuela) Jimy Szymanski	(Argentina) Mariano Hood (Argentina) Sebastián Prieto	2–6, 1–6
Win	3–2	Nov 1998	Australia F2, Frankston	Futures	Clay	(Australia) Toby Mitchell	(Australia) Luke Bourgeois (Australia) Andrew Painter	4–6, 6–1, 6–2
Win	4–2	Oct 1999	Uzbekistan F4, Fergana	Futures	Hard	(Israel) Lior Dahan	(Italy) Stefano Galvani (Israel) Andy Ram	7–5, 7–6
Loss	4–3	Oct 1999	Samarkand, Uzbekistan	Challenger	Clay	(Spain) Emilio Benfele Álvarez	(Russia) Andrei Stoliarov (Israel) Noam Behr	7–6, 3–6, 1–6
Win	5–3	Jun 2000	Germany F6, Villingen	Futures	Clay	(Romania) Ionuț Moldovan	(Sweden) Johan Settergren (Netherlands) Melle van Gemerden	7–6^{(8–6)}, 6–3

== Performance timeline ==
Key
W	F	SF	QF	#R	RR	Q#	DNQ	A	NH

(W) winner; (F) finalist; (SF) semifinalist; (QF) quarterfinalist; (#R) rounds 4, 3, 2, 1; (RR) round-robin stage; (Q#) qualification round; (DNQ) did not qualify; (A) absent; (NH) not held; (SR) strike rate (events won / competed); (W–L) win–loss record.

=== Singles ===
Tournament	1994	1995	1996	1997	SR	W–L	Win %
Grand Slam tournaments
Australian Open	A	A	1R	1R	0 / 2	0–2	0%
French Open	A	1R	2R	Q1	0 / 2	1–2	33%
Wimbledon	A	A	1R	A	0 / 1	0–1	0%
US Open	A	1R	1R	A	0 / 2	0–2	0%
Win–loss	0–0	0–2	1–4	0–1	0 / 7	1–7	13%
ATP Masters Series
Monte Carlo	A	Q1	A	A	0 / 0	0–0	–
Paris	Q1	Q1	A	A	0 / 0	0–0	–
Win–loss	0–0	0–0	0–0	0–0	0 / 0	0–0	–
