= Brandon Coupe =

American tennis player and coach (born 1972)

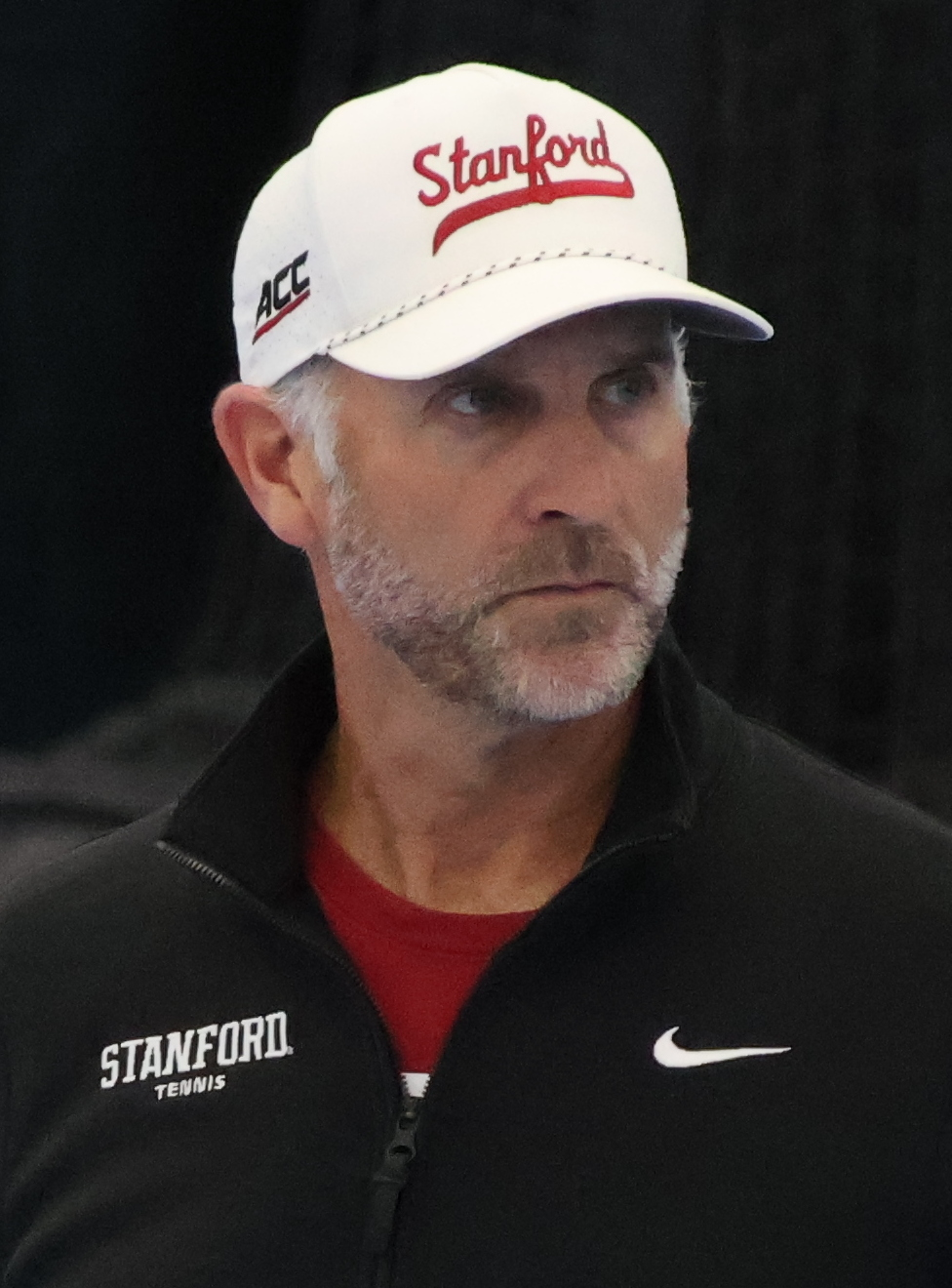
- Coupe with Stanford in 2026
- Country (sports): United States
- Born: April 11, 1972 (age 54) Roseville, California, US
- Height: 6 ft 0 in (1.83 m)
- Turned pro: 1994
- Plays: Right-handed
- Prize money: $326,938

Singles
- Career record: 0–1
- Career titles: 0; 0 Challenger, 0 Futures
- Highest ranking: No. 673 (30 January 1995)

Doubles
- Career record: 55–94
- Career titles: 1; 11 Challenger, 0 Futures
- Highest ranking: No. 62 (10 May 1999)

Grand Slam doubles results
- Australian Open: 2R (2000)
- French Open: 2R (1998, 1999)
- Wimbledon: 2R (1998, 1999)
- US Open: QF (2002)
- Last updated on: 2 November 2022.

Brandon Coupe (born April 11, 1972) is an American tennis coach and former professional player who is the associate head coach of the Stanford Cardinal men's tennis team. He enjoyed most of his tennis success while playing doubles. During his career, he won one doubles title. He achieved a career-high doubles ranking of world No. 62 in 1999.

During his time on tour, Coupe resided in Menlo Park, California.

Coupe became an assistant coach for the Stanford Cardinal men's tennis team under head coach John Whitlinger in 2007. He was promoted to associate head coach under new head coach Paul Goldstein in 2014.

== ATP career finals ==
=== Doubles: 3 (1 title, 2 runner-ups) ===
Legend Grand Slam Tournaments (0–0) ATP World Tour Finals (0–0) ATP Masters Series (0–0) ATP Championship Series (0–0) ATP World Series (1–2)	Finals by surface Hard (0–1) Clay (1–1) Grass (0–0) Carpet (0–0)	Finals by setting Outdoors (1–2) Indoors (0–0)

Result	W–L	Date	Tournament	Tier	Surface	Partner	Opponents	Score
Loss	0–1	Aug 1997	San Marino, San Marino	International Series	Clay	(Mexico) David Roditi	(Italy) Cristian Brandi (Italy) Filippo Messori	5–7, 4–6
Win	1–1	Jun 1998	Bologna, Italy	International Series	Clay	(South Africa) Paul Rosner	(Italy) Giorgio Galimberti (Italy) Massimo Valeri	7–6, 6–3
Loss	1–2	Aug 1998	Long Island, United States	International Series	Hard	(United States) Dave Randall	(Spain) Julian Alonso (Spain) Javier Sánchez	4–6, 4–6

== ATP Challenger and ITF Futures finals ==
=== Doubles: 27 (11–16) ===
Legend ATP Challenger (11–16) ITF Futures (0–0)	Finals by surface Hard (6–12) Clay (4–4) Grass (1–0) Carpet (0–0)

Result	W–L	Date	Tournament	Tier	Surface	Partner	Opponents	Score
Win	1–0	Nov 1995	Santiago, Chile	Challenger	Clay	(Canada) Sébastien Leblanc	(Ecuador) Nicolás Lapentti (Chile) Gabriel Silberstein	3–6, 7–5, 6–4
Win	2–0	Jul 1996	Scheveningen, Netherlands	Challenger	Clay	(South Africa) Paul Rosner	(Netherlands) Martijn Bok (Netherlands) Dennis Van Scheppingen	6–1, 3–6, 6–0
Loss	2–1	Sep 1996	Urbana, United States	Challenger	Hard	(United States) Trey Phillips	(United States) David Di Lucia (United States) Scott Humphries	4–6, 2–6
Win	3–1	Jun 1997	Furth, Germany	Challenger	Clay	(South Africa) Paul Rosner	(Germany) Martin Sinner (Netherlands) Joost Winnink	7–5, 6–3
Loss	3–2	Jun 1997	Zagreb, Croatia	Challenger	Clay	(South Africa) Paul Rosner	(Mexico) David Roditi (Czech Republic) Tomas Anzari	6–3, 6–7, 6–7
Win	4–2	Jun 1997	Braunschweig, Germany	Challenger	Clay	(South Africa) Paul Rosner	(Socialist Federal Republic of Yugoslavia) Nebojsa Djordjevic (Mexico) Óscar Ortiz	6–4, 6–3
Loss	4–3	Feb 2000	Amarillo, United States	Challenger	Hard	(United States) Michael Sell	(Australia) Michael Hill (United States) Brian Macphie	5–7, 2–6
Loss	4–4	Jun 2000	Furth, Germany	Challenger	Clay	(United States) Devin Bowen	(Spain) Eduardo Nicolás-Espín (Spain) Germán Puentes-Alcañiz	4–6, 2–6
Loss	4–5	Dec 2000	San Jose, Costa Rica	Challenger	Hard	(United States) Devin Bowen	(Argentina) Guillermo Cañas (Chile) Adrián García	6–7^{(5–7)}, 1–6
Loss	4–6	Jul 2001	Ulm, Germany	Challenger	Clay	(Australia) Tim Crichton	(Czech Republic) František Čermák (Czech Republic) David Škoch	2–6, 4–6
Loss	4–7	Jul 2001	Scheveningen, Netherlands	Challenger	Clay	(Australia) Tim Crichton	(Australia) Jordan Kerr (Australia) Grant Silcock	3–6, 4–6
Loss	4–8	Nov 2001	Knoxville, United States	Challenger	Hard	(United States) Kelly Gullett	(United States) Mardy Fish (United States) Jeff Morrison	3–6, 0–6
Win	5–8	Jan 2002	São Paulo, Brazil	Challenger	Hard	(Canada) Frédéric Niemeyer	(Argentina) Federico Browne (Peru) Luis Horna	6–7^{(5–7)}, 7–6^{(7–4)}, 6–4
Win	6–8	Mar 2002	Salinas, Ecuador	Challenger	Hard	(United States) Jeff Salzenstein	(Argentina) Martín Rodríguez (Argentina) Diego Veronelli	6–7^{(3–7)}, 6–4, 7–6^{(7–3)}
Loss	6–9	Apr 2002	Tarzana, United States	Challenger	Hard	(United States) Kevin Kim	(Switzerland) George Bastl (South Africa) Neville Godwin	3–6, 6–4, 3–6
Loss	6–10	Jul 2002	Aptos, United States	Challenger	Hard	(United States) Brandon Hawk	(Israel) Amir Hadad (Argentina) Martín Vassallo Argüello	4–6, 4–6
Loss	6–11	Aug 2002	Lexington, United States	Challenger	Hard	(Philippines) Eric Taino	(United States) Jack Brasington (United States) Glenn Weiner	2–6, 6–4, 5–7
Loss	6–12	Feb 2003	Joplin, United States	Challenger	Hard	(United States) Diego Ayala	(Argentina) Martín García (United States) Graydon Oliver	1–6, 4–6
Loss	6–13	Mar 2003	Cherbourg, France	Challenger	Hard	(United States) Scott Humphries	(France) Benjamin Cassaigne (South Africa) Rik de Voest	7–6^{(19–17)} 6–7^{(5–7)}, 6–7^{(11–13)}
Loss	6–14	Jun 2003	Atlantic City, United States	Challenger	Hard	(United States) Paul Goldstein	(United States) Tripp Phillips (United States) Ryan Sachire	5–7, 3–6
Win	7–14	Jul 2003	Córdoba, Spain	Challenger	Hard	(Israel) Noam Okun	(Spain) Juan Ignacio Carrasco (Spain) Albert Portas	6–4, 1–6, 6–4
Win	8–14	Oct 2003	Tiburon, United States	Challenger	Hard	(United States) Justin Gimelstob	(United States) Diego Ayala (United States) Robert Kendrick	0–6, 6–3, 7–6^{(7–3)}
Loss	8–15	Feb 2004	Waikoloa, United States	Challenger	Hard	(United States) Travis Parrott	(United States) Brian Vahaly (United States) Scott Humphries	3–6, 6–7^{(3–7)}
Win	9–15	Jun 2004	Forest Hills, United States	Challenger	Grass	(United States) Justin Gimelstob	(United States) Travis Rettenmaier (Australia) Michael Tebbutt	6–4, 6–4
Win	10–15	Jul 2004	Córdoba, Spain	Challenger	Hard	(United States) Tripp Phillips	(Spain) Emilio Benfele Álvarez (Brazil) Josh Goffi	7–6^{(8–6)}, 7–6^{(7–1)}
Loss	10–16	Oct 2004	Tiburon, United States	Challenger	Hard	(United States) Robert Kendrick	(Brazil) André Sá (Brazil) Bruno Soares	2–6, 3–6
Win	11–16	Jun 2005	Yuba City, United States	Challenger	Hard	(United States) Justin Gimelstob	(Mexico) Santiago González (Brazil) Bruno Soares	6–2, 3–6, 7–6^{(7–1)}

== Performance timeline ==
Key
W	F	SF	QF	#R	RR	Q#	DNQ	A	NH

(W) winner; (F) finalist; (SF) semifinalist; (QF) quarterfinalist; (#R) rounds 4, 3, 2, 1; (RR) round-robin stage; (Q#) qualification round; (DNQ) did not qualify; (A) absent; (NH) not held; (SR) strike rate (events won / competed); (W–L) win–loss record.

=== Doubles ===
Tournament	1996	1997	1998	1999	2000	2001	2002	2003	2004	2005	SR	W–L	Win %
Grand Slam tournaments
Australian Open	A	A	1R	1R	2R	1R	A	A	A	A	0 / 4	1–4	20%
French Open	A	A	2R	2R	1R	A	A	A	A	A	0 / 3	2–3	40%
Wimbledon	A	A	2R	2R	1R	A	Q1	A	Q2	Q1	0 / 3	2–3	40%
US Open	A	1R	3R	1R	A	Q1	QF	1R	A	A	0 / 5	5–5	50%
Win–loss	0–0	0–1	4–4	2–4	1–3	0–1	3–1	0–1	0–0	0–0	0 / 15	10–15	0%
ATP World Tour Masters 1000
Indian Wells	A	A	A	Q2	Q1	A	A	A	A	A	0 / 0	0–0	–
Miami	A	A	1R	3R	Q1	A	A	A	A	1R	0 / 3	2–3	40%
Toronto / Montreal	Q2	A	2R	1R	A	A	A	A	A	A	0 / 2	1–2	33%
Cincinnati	A	A	1R	QF	A	A	A	A	A	A	0 / 2	2–2	50%
Win–loss	0–0	0–0	1–3	4–3	0–0	0–0	0–0	0–0	0–0	0–1	0 / 7	5–7	42%
