= Giorgio Galimberti =

Italian tennis player

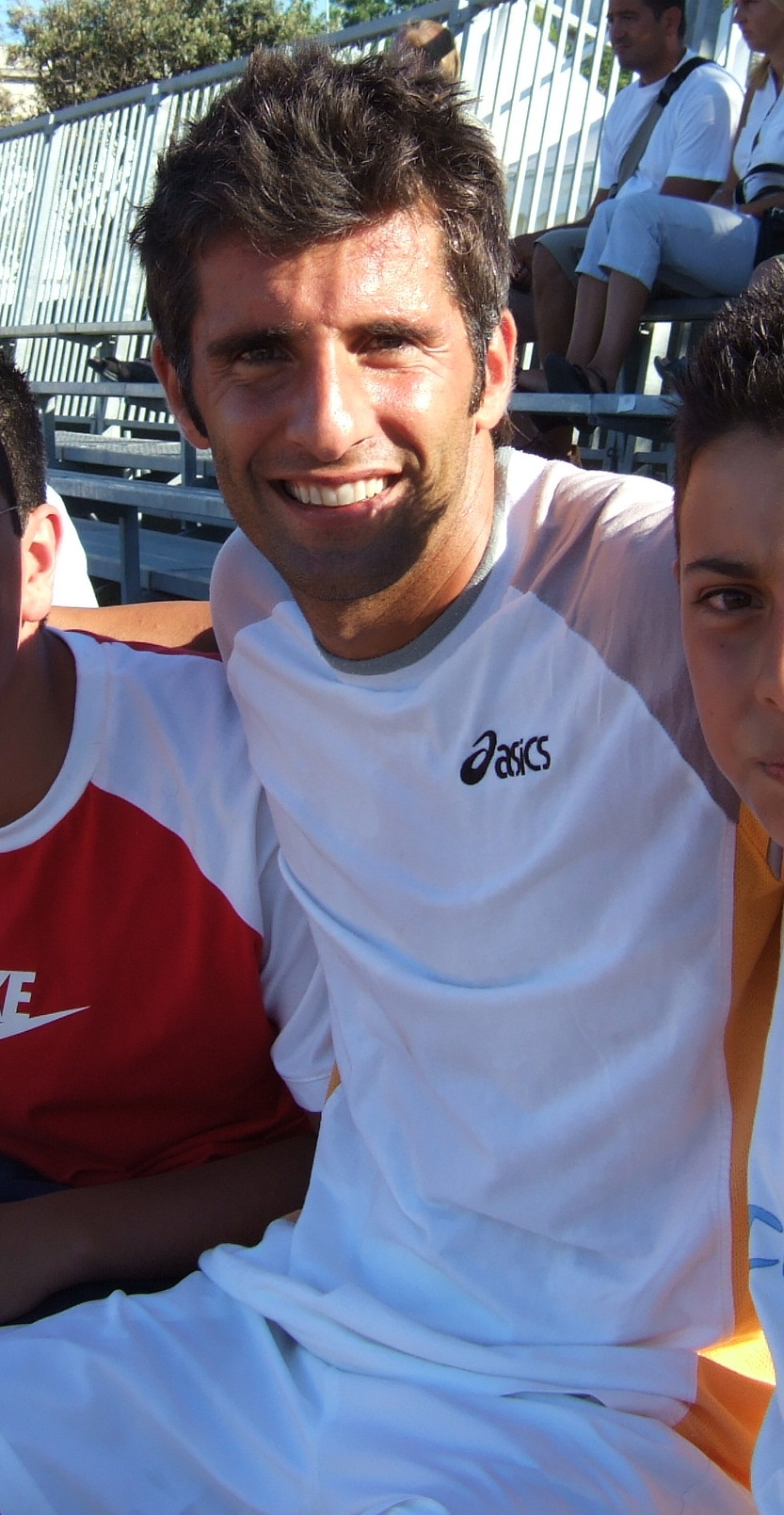
- Country (sports): Italy
- Residence: Lissone, Italy
- Born: 5 September 1976 (age 49) Milan, Italy
- Height: 1.78 m (5 ft 10 in)
- Turned pro: 1995
- Retired: 2007
- Plays: Right-handed (one-handed backhand)
- Coach: Maurizio Riva
- Prize money: US$619,170

Singles
- Career record: 9–21
- Career titles: 0
- Highest ranking: No. 115 (5 May 2003)

Grand Slam singles results
- Australian Open: Q2 (2006)
- French Open: 2R (2003)
- Wimbledon: Q2 (1997, 2000)
- US Open: 2R (1998, 2005)

Doubles
- Career record: 30–37
- Career titles: 1
- Highest ranking: No. 65 (6 June 2005)

Grand Slam doubles results
- Australian Open: 2R (2005)
- French Open: 3R (2005)
- Wimbledon: 1R (2004, 2005)
- US Open: 1R (2005)
- Last updated on: 20 December 2022.

Giorgio Galimberti (Italian pronunciation: [ˈdʒordʒo ɡalimˈbɛrti, ˈdʒɔr-]; born 5 September 1976) is a former Italian professional tennis player.

Born in Milan, Galimberti turned professional in 1995. His career-high rankings were World No. 115 (May 2003) in singles and No. 65 (June 2005) in doubles.

== Tennis career ==
As a junior, Galimberti reached the final of the 1994 French Open, losing to Jacobo Díaz. En route, he defeated future top pros Stefan Koubek, Gustavo Kuerten, Mariano Zabaleta and Nicolás Lapentti. On the pro tour, Galimberti played singles mostly at Challenger level, while in doubles he won the 2005 ATP title in Milan, teaming up with Daniele Bracciali, and reached two other ATP finals.

== Performance Timeline ==
Key
W	F	SF	QF	#R	RR	Q#	P#	DNQ	A	Z#	PO	G	S	B	NMS	NTI	P	NH

(W) winner; (F) finalist; (SF) semifinalist; (QF) quarterfinalist; (#R) rounds 4, 3, 2, 1; (RR) round-robin stage; (Q#) qualification round; (P#) preliminary round; (DNQ) did not qualify; (A) absent; (Z#) Davis/Fed Cup Zonal Group (with number indication) or (PO) play-off; (G) gold, (S) silver or (B) bronze Olympic/Paralympic medal; (NMS) not a Masters tournament; (NTI) not a Tier I tournament; (P) postponed; (NH) not held; (SR) strike rate (events won / competed); (W–L) win–loss record.

=== Singles ===
Tournament	1994	1995	1996	1997	1998	1999	2000	2001	2002	2003	2004	2005	2006	2007	SR	W–L	Win%
Grand Slam tournaments
Australian Open	A	A	A	A	A	Q1	Q1	A	A	A	Q1	Q1	Q2	A	0 / 0	0–0	–
French Open	A	A	A	A	Q1	A	Q3	A	1R	2R	Q2	Q1	Q1	A	0 / 2	1–2	33%
Wimbledon	A	A	A	Q2	A	A	Q2	Q1	A	A	Q1	Q1	A	Q1	0 / 0	0–0	–
US Open	A	A	A	Q1	2R	Q2	Q2	Q2	Q1	1R	A	2R	Q1	A	0 / 3	2–3	40%
Win–loss	0–0	0–0	0–0	0–0	1–1	0–0	0–0	0–0	0–1	1–2	0–0	1–1	0–0	0–0	0 / 5	3–5	38%
ATP Tour Masters 1000
Indian Wells	A	A	A	A	A	A	A	A	A	A	Q2	A	A	A	0 / 0	0–0	–
Monte Carlo	A	A	A	A	A	A	A	A	Q2	Q1	A	A	Q1	A	0 / 0	0–0	–
Rome	Q1	Q1	Q3	Q2	1R	Q1	A	A	2R	2R	Q2	A	Q2	A	0 / 3	2–3	40%
Win–loss	0–0	0–0	0–0	0–0	0–1	0–0	0–0	0–0	1–1	1–1	0–0	0–0	0–0	0–0	0 / 3	2–3	40%

== ATP career finals ==
=== Doubles: 3 (1 title, 2 runner-ups) ===
Legend Grand Slam Tournaments (0–0) ATP World Tour Finals (0–0) ATP Masters Series (0–0) ATP Championship Series (0–0) ATP World Series (1–2)	Finals by surface Hard (0–0) Clay (0–1) Grass (0–0) Carpet (1–1)	Finals by setting Outdoors (0–1) Indoors (1–1)

Result	W–L	Date	Tournament	Tier	Surface	Partner	Opponents	Score
Loss	0–1	Jun 1998	Bologna, Italy	International Series	Clay	(Italy) Massimo Valeri	(United States) Brandon Coupe (South Africa) Paul Rosner	6–7, 3–6
Loss	0–2	Feb 2004	Milan, Italy	International Series	Carpet	(Italy) Daniele Bracciali	(United States) Jared Palmer (Czech Republic) Pavel Vízner	4–6, 4–6
Win	1–2	Feb 2005	Milan, Italy	International Series	Carpet	(Italy) Daniele Bracciali	(France) Arnaud Clément (France) Jean-François Bachelot	6–7^{(8–10)}, 7–6^{(8–6)}, 6–4

== ATP Challenger and ITF Futures finals ==
=== Singles: 12 (5–7) ===
Legend ATP Challenger (3–4) ITF Futures (2–3)	Finals by surface Hard (1–3) Clay (4–4) Grass (0–0) Carpet (0–0)

Result	W–L	Date	Tournament	Tier	Surface	Opponent	Score
Loss	0–1	May 1998	Italy F5, Frascati	Futures	Clay	(Argentina) Agustín Calleri	1–6, 2–6
Loss	0–2	Jun 1998	Italy F8, Bressanone	Futures	Clay	(Czech Republic) Radovan Svetlik	1–6, ret.
Loss	0–3	Jul 1999	Olbia, Italy	Challenger	Hard	(Italy) Stefano Pescosolido	7–6, 4–6, 6–7
Win	1–3	May 2001	Budapest, Hungary	Challenger	Clay	(Finland) Jarkko Nieminen	6–4, 5–7, 6–1
Win	2–3	Jun 2001	Italy F5, Pavia	Futures	Clay	(Austria) Thomas Schiessling	6–2, 7–6^{(7–4)}
Loss	2–4	Jul 2001	Sassuolo, Italy	Challenger	Hard	(Hungary) Attila Sávolt	4–6, 5–7
Loss	2–5	Jan 2002	USA F2, Delray Beach	Futures	Hard	(Russia) Igor Kunitsyn	4–6, 2–6
Loss	2–6	Jun 2002	Lugano, Switzerland	Challenger	Clay	(Argentina) Guillermo Coria	3–6, 0–6
Win	3–6	May 2003	Rome, Italy	Challenger	Clay	(Romania) Victor Hănescu	6–2, 6–4
Win	4–6	Feb 2005	Italy F1, Trento	Futures	Hard	(Georgia (country)) Lado Chikhladze	7–5, 7–6^{(9–7)}
Win	5–6	Jul 2005	Mantova, Italy	Challenger	Clay	(Italy) Francesco Aldi	6–3, 6–3
Loss	5–7	Jul 2006	Mantova, Italy	Challenger	Clay	(Switzerland) Cristian Villagrán	2–6, 7–5, 4–6

=== Doubles: 39 (28–11) ===
Legend ATP Challenger (24–7) ITF Futures (4–4)	Finals by surface Hard (3–3) Clay (22–7) Grass (0–0) Carpet (3–1)

Result	W–L	Date	Tournament	Tier	Surface	Partner	Opponents	Score
Loss	0–1	Sep 1995	Merano, Italy	Challenger	Clay	(Sweden) Federico Rovai	(Italy) Cristian Brandi (Italy) Igor Gaudi	6–7, 3–6
Win	1–1	Jul 1997	Venice, Italy	Challenger	Clay	(Italy) Massimo Valeri	(Mexico) David Roditi (Argentina) Martín Rodríguez	6–4, 0–6, 7–6
Loss	1–2	Mar 1998	Italy F1, Cagliari	Futures	Clay	(Italy) Massimo Valeri	(Czech Republic) Radek Štěpánek (Czech Republic) Michal Tabara	5–7, 7–6, 4–6
Loss	1–3	Apr 1998	Italy F4, Rome	Futures	Clay	(Italy) Massimo Valeri	(Argentina) Agustín Calleri (Croatia) Igor Saric	3–6, 4–6
Win	2–3	May 1998	Italy F5, Frascati	Futures	Clay	(Italy) Massimo Valeri	(Italy) Omar Camporese (Croatia) Ivan Ljubičić	7–6, 6–1
Win	3–3	May 1998	Italy F7, Parma	Futures	Clay	(Italy) Massimo Valeri	(Senegal) Yahiya Doumbia (Brazil) Alexandre Simoni	7–5, 3–6, 7–5
Loss	3–4	Jul 1998	Merano, Italy	Challenger	Clay	(Italy) Massimo Valeri	(Argentina) Pablo Albano (Ecuador) Nicolás Lapentti	1–6, 1–6
Loss	3–5	Mar 1999	Kyoto, Japan	Challenger	Carpet	(South Korea) Lee Hyung-taik	(Austria) Julian Knowle (Switzerland) Lorenzo Manta	1–6, 7–6, 2–6
Win	4–5	May 1999	Italy F5, Rome	Futures	Clay	(Italy) Filippo Messori	(Italy) Gianluca Luddi (Italy) Stefano Tarallo	6–1, 6–3
Win	5–5	Jul 1999	Olbia, Italy	Challenger	Hard	(Italy) Omar Camporese	(Italy) Filippo Messori (Italy) Massimo Valeri	6–4, 6–1
Win	6–5	Feb 2000	Lübeck, Germany	Challenger	Carpet	(Italy) Diego Nargiso	(Germany) Karsten Braasch (Germany) Dirk Dier	6–4, 6–4
Win	6–5	Sep 2000	USA F22B, East Setauket	Futures	Clay	(India) Fazaluddin Syed	(South Africa) Joel McGregor (United States) Nenad Toroman	6–7^{(5–7)}, 7–5, 6–4
Win	7–5	Dec 2000	Milan, Italy	Challenger	Carpet	(Switzerland) George Bastl	(Italy) Filippo Messori (Italy) Vincenzo Santopadre	6–4, 7–6^{(7–4)}
Loss	7–6	Jan 2001	USA F3, Hallandale Beach	Futures	Hard	(Israel) Noam Behr	(Canada) Frédéric Niemeyer (Canada) Jocelyn Robichaud	6–7^{(4–7)}, 3–6
Loss	7–7	Feb 2001	Chandigarh, India	Challenger	Hard	(Israel) Nir Welgreen	(Czech Republic) František Čermák (Czech Republic) Radek Štěpánek	4–6, 2–6
Win	8–7	Sep 2001	Brindisi, Italy	Challenger	Clay	(Italy) Daniele Bracciali	(Italy) Cristian Brandi (Italy) Uros Vico	2–6, 7–6^{(7–5)}, 7–6^{(7–3)}
Loss	8–8	Jan 2002	USA F1, Aventura	Futures	Hard	(Switzerland) Yves Allegro	(United States) Thomas Blake (United States) Kristian Capalik	3–6, 7–6^{(7–2)}, 1–6
Win	9–8	Feb 2002	Dallas, United States	Challenger	Hard	(Canada) Frédéric Niemeyer	(United States) Huntley Montgomery (United States) Brian Vahaly	7–6^{(7–1)}, 6–4
Win	10–8	Apr 2002	Sanremo, Italy	Challenger	Clay	(Italy) Daniele Bracciali	(Italy) Cristian Brandi (Italy) Renzo Furlan	6–3, 6–4
Win	11–8	Jun 2002	Biella, Italy	Challenger	Clay	(Slovakia) Dominik Hrbatý	(Australia) Ashley Fisher (Australia) Nathan Healey	3–6, 6–3, 7–5
Win	12–8	Jun 2002	Lugano, Switzerland	Challenger	Clay	(Spain) Emilio Benfele Álvarez	(Argentina) Cristian Kordasz (Finland) Kim Tiilikainen	4–6, 7–6^{(7–5)}, 6–3
Win	13–8	Jul 2002	Mantova, Italy	Challenger	Clay	(Italy) Massimo Bertolini	(Argentina) Jose Arnedo (Australia) Joseph Sirianni	5–7, 6–2, 7–6^{(9–7)}
Win	14–8	Dec 2002	Milan, Italy	Challenger	Carpet	(Italy) Massimo Bertolini	(Israel) Jonathan Erlich (North Macedonia) Aleksandar Kitinov	7–6^{(7–4)}, 2–6, 7–6^{(7–4)}
Loss	14–9	Mar 2003	Barletta, Italy	Challenger	Clay	(Italy) Massimo Bertolini	(Argentina) Sebastián Prieto (Argentina) Sergio Roitman	3–6, 6–3, 3–6
Win	15–9	Apr 2003	Naples, Italy	Challenger	Clay	(Italy) Massimo Bertolini	(Israel) Amir Hadad (Belgium) Christophe Rochus	2–6, 7–5, 6–4
Win	16–9	Mar 2004	Cagliari, Italy	Challenger	Clay	(Germany) Tomas Behrend	(Austria) Werner Eschauer (Austria) Daniel Köllerer	6–2, 6–1
Win	17–9	Apr 2004	Olbia, Italy	Challenger	Clay	(Italy) Daniele Bracciali	(Chile) Hermes Gamonal (Argentina) Ignacio Gonzalez-King	6–3, 6–4
Win	18–9	Apr 2004	Naples, Italy	Challenger	Clay	(Germany) Tomas Behrend	(Czech Republic) Michal Tabara (Czech Republic) Jiří Vaněk	6–1, 6–3
Win	19–9	May 2004	Sanremo, Italy	Challenger	Clay	(Italy) Daniele Bracciali	(Italy) Manuel Jorquera (Argentina) Diego Moyano	4–6, 7–6^{(8–6)}, 6–2
Win	20–9	May 2004	Turin, Italy	Challenger	Clay	(Italy) Leonardo Azzaro	(Chile) Hermes Gamonal (Chile) Adrián García	6–1, 6–3
Win	21–9	Jun 2004	Lugano, Switzerland	Challenger	Clay	(Spain) Emilio Benfele Álvarez	(Italy) Enzo Artoni (Argentina) Ignacio González King	6–4, 6–3
Win	22–9	Jul 2004	Mantova, Italy	Challenger	Clay	(Italy) Daniele Bracciali	(Italy) Flavio Cipolla (Italy) Alessandro Motti	6–0, 6–4
Win	23–9	Jul 2004	San Benedetto Del Tronto, Italy	Challenger	Clay	(Italy) Daniele Bracciali	(Argentina) Andres Dellatorre (Argentina) Nicolás Todero	6–4, 7–5
Win	24–9	Jul 2004	Rimini, Italy	Challenger	Clay	(Italy) Daniele Bracciali	(Italy) Stefano Cobolli (Italy) Vincenzo Santopadre	walkover
Loss	24–10	Aug 2005	Trani, Italy	Challenger	Clay	(Georgia (country)) Irakli Labadze	(Argentina) Carlos Berlocq (Switzerland) Cristian Villagrán	6–4, 2–6, 4–6
Win	25–19	Feb 2006	Bergamo, Italy	Challenger	Hard	(Italy) Daniele Bracciali	(Germany) Christopher Kas (Germany) Vincenzo Santopadre	7–5, 0–6, [13–11]
Win	26–10	Jun 2006	Lugano, Switzerland	Challenger	Clay	(Austria) Oliver Marach	(Italy) Leonardo Azzaro (Argentina) Sergio Roitman	7–5, 6–3
Win	27–10	Jun 2006	Milan, Italy	Challenger	Clay	(Israel) Harel Levy	(Portugal) Fred Gil (Spain) Juan-Albert Viloca-Puig	6–3, 6–3
Loss	27–11	Jul 2006	Reggio Emilia, Italy	Challenger	Clay	(Italy) Alessandro Motti	(Italy) Fabio Colangelo (Italy) Giancarlo Petrazzuolo	3–6, 4–6
Win	28–11	Jun 2007	Sassuolo, Italy	Challenger	Clay	(Brazil) Márcio Torres	(Italy) Daniele Giorgini (Italy) Andrea Stoppini	6–3, 6–7^{(2–7)}, [10–6]

== Junior Grand Slam Finals ==
=== Singles: 1 (1 runner-up) ===
Result	Year	Tournament	Surface	Opponent	Score
Loss	1994	French Open	Clay	(Spain) Jacobo Díaz	3–6, 6–7
