= Tom Vanhoudt =

Belgian tennis player

- Country (sports): Belgium
- Residence: Beringen, Belgium
- Born: 28 July 1972 (age 53); Diest, Belgium
- Height: 1.83 m (6 ft 0 in)
- Turned pro: 1991
- Retired: 2005
- Plays: Right-handed
- Prize money: $675,139

Singles
- Career record: 0–0
- Career titles: 0; 0 Challenger, 0 Futures
- Highest ranking: No. 203 (15 April 1996)

Grand Slam singles results
- Australian Open: Q1 (1998)

Doubles
- Career record: 125–193
- Career titles: 1; 28 Challenger, 0 Futures
- Highest ranking: No. 36 (10 September 2001)

Grand Slam doubles results
- Australian Open: QF (2000)
- French Open: 3R (2003)
- Wimbledon: QF (2001)
- US Open: 3R (2002)

Grand Slam mixed doubles results
- Australian Open: 1R (2001, 2002)
- French Open: 2R (1999)
- Wimbledon: 3R (2000, 2001)
- US Open: 1R (2001)
- Last updated on: 7 April 2022.

Tom Vanhoudt (born 28 July 1972, in Diest, Flemish Brabant), is a former professional tennis player from Belgium.

Vanhoudt achieved a career-high doubles ranking of World No. 36 in 2001. He participated in 9 Davis Cup ties for Belgium from 1991 to 2002, posting a 4–5 record in doubles.

== ATP career finals ==
=== Doubles: 1 (1 title) ===
Legend Grand Slam Tournaments (0–0) ATP World Tour Finals (0–0) ATP Masters Series (0–0) ATP Championship Series (0–0) ATP World Series (1–0)	Finals by surface Hard (0–0) Clay (1–0) Grass (0–0) Carpet (0–0)	Finals by setting Outdoors (1–0) Indoors (0–0)

Result	W–L	Date	Tournament	Tier	Surface	Partner	Opponents	Score
Win	1–0	Aug 1993	Umag, Croatia	World Series	Clay	(Belgium) Filip Dewulf	(Spain) Jordi Arrese (Spain) Francisco Roig	6–4, 7–5

== ATP Challenger and ITF Futures finals ==
=== Doubles: 39 (28–11) ===
Legend ATP Challenger (28–11) ITF Futures (0–0)	Finals by surface Hard (0–2) Clay (26–8) Grass (1–0) Carpet (1–1)

Result	W–L	Date	Tournament	Tier	Surface	Partner	Opponents	Score
Loss	0–1	Jul 1992	Oberstaufen, Germany	Challenger	Clay	(Belgium) Filip Dewulf	(Australia) Johan Anderson (Sweden) Lars-Anders Wahlgren	6–2, 6–7, 4–6
Win	1–1	Aug 1992	Geneva, Switzerland	Challenger	Clay	(Belgium) Filip Dewulf	(Venezuela) Alfonso Gonzalez-Mora (Chile) Marcelo Rebolledo	6–3, 6–2
Win	2–1	Sep 1992	Casablanca, Morocco	Challenger	Clay	(Belgium) Filip Dewulf	(Slovakia) Karol Kučera (Russia) Andrey Merinov	7–5, 6–3
Loss	2–2	Nov 1992	Bandar Seri Begawan, Brunei	Challenger	Hard	(Belgium) Filip Dewulf	(Republic of Ireland) Owen Casey (United States) Donald Johnson	2–6, 3–6
Loss	2–3	Mar 1993	Garmisch, Germany	Challenger	Carpet	(Belgium) Filip Dewulf	(United States) Mike Bauer (Germany) Alexander Mronz	6–7, 6–3, 2–6
Win	3–3	Aug 1993	Graz, Austria	Challenger	Clay	(Belgium) Filip Dewulf	(Spain) Jordi Arrese (Spain) Francisco Roig	6–7, 6–2, 6–3
Win	4–3	Sep 1993	Budapest, Hungary	Challenger	Clay	(Belgium) Filip Dewulf	(Italy) Stefano Pescosolido (Italy) Massimo Valeri	7–5, 6–3
Loss	4–4	Jul 1994	Scheveningen, Netherlands	Challenger	Clay	(Netherlands) Stephen Noteboom	(Sweden) Mårten Renström (Sweden) Mikael Tillström	6–2, 5–7, 3–6
Win	5–4	Jul 1995	Seville, Spain	Challenger	Clay	(Netherlands) Martijn Bok	(United States) Francisco Montana (Republic of Ireland) Claude N'Goran	6–2, 6–2
Loss	5–5	Oct 1995	Siracuse, Italy	Challenger	Clay	(Australia) Todd Larkham	(Sweden) Magnus Norman (Sweden) Tomas Nydahl	3–6, 4–6
Loss	5–6	May 1996	Bratislava, Slovakia	Challenger	Clay	(Italy) Filippo Messori	(Argentina) Marcelo Charpentier (Brazil) Gustavo Kuerten	6–3, 3–6, 5–7
Win	6–6	May 1996	Budapest, Hungary	Challenger	Clay	(Portugal) Nuno Marques	(Israel) Eyal Ran (Italy) Laurence Tieleman	6–4, 6–1
Win	7–6	Jun 1996	Szczecin, Poland	Challenger	Clay	(Netherlands) Fernon Wibier	(Portugal) Emanuel Couto (Portugal) Nuno Marques	6–1, 6–1
Win	8–6	Sep 1996	Seville, Spain	Challenger	Clay	(Sweden) Ola Kristiansson	(Italy) Fabio Maggi (Costa Rica) Juan Antonio Marín	6–0, 6–7, 6–1
Win	9–6	Apr 1997	Barletta, Italy	Challenger	Clay	(Portugal) Nuno Marques	(Spain) Alberto Martín (Spain) Albert Portas	6–3, 6–4
Win	10–6	Apr 1997	Napoli, Italy	Challenger	Clay	(North Macedonia) Aleksandar Kitinov	(Spain) Tomás Carbonell (Spain) Francisco Roig	7–6, 6–4
Win	11–6	May 1997	Budapest, Hungary	Challenger	Clay	(Portugal) Nuno Marques	(United States) Greg Van Emburgh (North Macedonia) Aleksandar Kitinov	2–6, 6–4, 6–3
Win	12–6	Jul 1997	Ulm, Germany	Challenger	Clay	(Belgium) Kris Goossens	(Czech Republic) Petr Luxa (Czech Republic) Petr Pála	6–3, 6–0
Win	13–6	Jul 1997	Scheveningen, Netherlands	Challenger	Clay	(Spain) Álex Calatrava	(Netherlands) Raemon Sluiter (Netherlands) Peter Wessels	6–7, 6–2, 7–6
Win	14–6	Jul 1997	Ostend, Belgium	Challenger	Clay	(Belgium) Kris Goossens	(France) Tarik Benhabiles (France) Julien Boutter	3–6, 6–4, 6–0
Win	15–6	Aug 1997	Graz, Austria	Challenger	Clay	(Argentina) Lucas Arnold Ker	(Spain) Alberto Martín (Spain) Albert Portas	6–1, 6–2
Win	16–6	Feb 1999	Lucknow, India	Challenger	Grass	(Portugal) Nuno Marques	(South Africa) Marcos Ondruska (United Kingdom) Andrew Richardson	6–4, 5–7, 6–1
Win	17–6	May 1999	Ljubljana, Slovenia	Challenger	Clay	(Italy) Massimo Valeri	(Spain) Eduardo Nicolás Espin (Spain) Germán Puentes Alcañiz	7–6^{(10–8)}, 6–4
Win	18–6	Jul 1999	Graz, Austria	Challenger	Clay	(Portugal) Nuno Marques	(Spain) Albert Portas (Spain) Germán Puentes Alcañiz	6–2, 6–2
Win	19–6	Jul 1999	Scheveningen, Netherlands	Challenger	Clay	(Israel) Eyal Ran	(New Zealand) James Greenhalgh (South Africa) Paul Rosner	6–4, 6–4
Win	20–6	May 2002	Zagreb, Croatia	Challenger	Clay	(Belgium) Dick Norman	(Australia) Jordan Kerr (Australia) Grant Silcock	6–3, 4–6, 6–3
Win	21–6	Nov 2002	Aachen, Germany	Challenger	Carpet	(United States) Jim Thomas	(Japan) Thomas Shimada (Japan) Takao Suzuki	6–7^{(4–7)}, 7–6^{(7–4)}, 6–3
Loss	21–7	Jun 2003	Biella, Italy	Challenger	Clay	(Australia) Jordan Kerr	(Italy) Stefano Galvani (Argentina) Martín Vassallo Argüello	6–3, 6–7^{(4–7)}, 3–6
Win	22–7	Aug 2003	San Marino, San Marino	Challenger	Clay	(Italy) Massimo Bertolini	(Argentina) Federico Browne (Slovakia) Dominik Hrbatý	7–5, 6–7^{(3–7)}, 6–2
Win	23–7	Mar 2004	Saint Brieuc, France	Challenger	Clay	(Belgium) Christophe Rochus	(Czech Republic) David Škoch (Czech Republic) Jiří Vaněk	6–0, 6–1
Win	24–7	Apr 2004	Paget, Bermuda	Challenger	Clay	(Australia) Jordan Kerr	(Australia) Ashley Fisher (Australia) Stephen Huss	4–6, 6–3, 7–6^{(8–6)}
Loss	24–8	May 2004	Zagreb, Croatia	Challenger	Clay	(Australia) Jordan Kerr	(Slovakia) Karol Beck (Czech Republic) Jaroslav Levinský	2–6, 6–7^{(4–7)}
Win	25–8	Aug 2004	San Marino, San Marino	Challenger	Clay	(Italy) Massimo Bertolini	(Chile) Adrián García (Spain) Álex López Morón	6–2, 6–4
Loss	25–9	Sep 2004	Genoa, Italy	Challenger	Clay	(Italy) Massimo Bertolini	(Spain) Emilio Benfele Álvarez (Spain) Álex López Morón	3–6, 4–6
Win	26–9	Mar 2005	Barletta, Italy	Challenger	Clay	(Belgium) Kristof Vliegen	(Czech Republic) Lukáš Dlouhý (Russia) Yuri Schukin	6–2, 5–7, 7–5
Win	27–9	May 2005	Zagreb, Croatia	Challenger	Clay	(Romania) Gabriel Trifu	(Italy) Enzo Artoni (Argentina) Martín Vassallo Argüello	6–2, 4–6, 7–5
Loss	27–10	Jun 2005	Braunschweig, Germany	Challenger	Clay	(Italy) Massimo Bertolini	(Italy) Enzo Artoni (Spain) Álex López Morón	7–5, 4–6, 6–7^{(12–14)}
Win	28–10	Jul 2005	Biella, Italy	Challenger	Clay	(Romania) Gabriel Trifu	(Argentina) Carlos Berlocq (Brazil) Ricardo Mello	6–4, 4–6, 6–4
Loss	28–11	Oct 2005	Mons, Belgium	Challenger	Hard	(Czech Republic) Tomáš Cibulec	(Germany) Christopher Kas (Germany) Philipp Petzschner	6–7^{(4–7)}, 2–6

== Performance timelines ==
Key
W	F	SF	QF	#R	RR	Q#	DNQ	A	NH

(W) winner; (F) finalist; (SF) semifinalist; (QF) quarterfinalist; (#R) rounds 4, 3, 2, 1; (RR) round-robin stage; (Q#) qualification round; (DNQ) did not qualify; (A) absent; (NH) not held; (SR) strike rate (events won / competed); (W–L) win–loss record.

=== Doubles ===
Tournament	1997	1998	1999	2000	2001	2002	2003	2004	2005	SR	W–L	Win%
Grand Slam tournaments
Australian Open	A	2R	A	QF	3R	1R	1R	A	1R	0 / 6	6–6	50%
French Open	1R	2R	1R	1R	1R	2R	3R	2R	1R	0 / 9	5–9	36%
Wimbledon	A	2R	1R	1R	QF	1R	2R	1R	A	0 / 7	5–7	42%
US Open	2R	A	2R	2R	1R	3R	2R	1R	1R	0 / 8	6–8	43%
Win–loss	1–2	3–3	1–3	4–4	5–4	3–4	4–4	1–3	0–3	0 / 30	22–30	42%
ATP World Tour Masters 1000
Indian Wells	A	A	A	1R	1R	A	A	A	A	0 / 2	0–2	0%
Miami	A	A	A	1R	3R	QF	A	1R	A	0 / 4	5–4	56%
Monte Carlo	A	A	A	1R	1R	1R	A	A	A	0 / 3	0–3	0%
Rome	A	A	A	1R	1R	A	A	A	A	0 / 2	0–2	0%
Hamburg	A	A	A	A	1R	A	A	A	A	0 / 1	0–1	0%
Canada	A	A	A	A	1R	A	A	A	A	0 / 1	0–1	0%
Cincinnati	A	A	A	A	1R	A	A	A	A	0 / 1	0–1	0%
Stuttgart	A	A	A	A	1R	A	A	A	A	0 / 1	0–1	0%
Paris	A	A	A	A	1R	A	A	A	A	0 / 0	0–0	0%
Win–loss	0–0	0–0	0–0	0–4	2–9	3–2	0–0	0–1	0–0	0 / 16	5–16	24%

=== Mixed doubles ===
Tournament	1998	1999	2000	2001	2002	2003	2004	SR	W–L	Win %
Grand Slam tournaments
Australian Open	A	A	A	1R	1R	A	A	0 / 2	0–2	0%
French Open	1R	2R	1R	A	A	A	1R	0 / 4	1–4	20%
Wimbledon	2R	1R	3R	3R	1R	1R	1R	0 / 7	5–7	42%
US Open	A	A	A	1R	A	A	A	0 / 1	0–1	0%
Win–loss	1–2	1–2	2–2	2–3	0–2	0–1	0–2	0 / 14	6–14	30%
