= Paul Rosner =

South African tennis player

- Country (sports): South Africa
- Residence: Birmingham, United States
- Born: 11 December 1972 (age 52) Johannesburg, South Africa
- Height: 1.93 m (6 ft 4 in)
- Turned pro: 1996
- Plays: Right-handed
- Prize money: $232,555

Doubles
- Career record: 42–68
- Career titles: 1
- Highest ranking: No. 62 (19 October 1998)

Grand Slam doubles results
- Australian Open: 1R (1998, 1999, 2001, 2002)
- French Open: 1R (1998, 1999, 2002)
- Wimbledon: 3R (1998)
- US Open: 1R (1998, 2002)

Paul Rosner (born 11 December 1972) is a former professional tennis player from South Africa.

== Career ==
From 1991 to 1995, Rosner competed in the United States, playing for University of Alabama at Birmingham in NCAA Men's Tennis Championship. He was an All-American on three occasions.

A doubles specialist, Rosner won 11 men's tournaments on the ATP Challenger Tour. He won one ATP World Tour title, at Bologna, Italy in 1998, with American Brandon Coupe.

Rosner entered into the Men's doubles draw of 13 Grand Slams but only twice made it past the first round. The first time was in the 1998 Wimbledon Championships, when he and partner David DiLucia reached the second round, by defeating Nicolás Lapentti and Javier Sánchez in four sets. In the 1999 Wimbledon Championships he went further, this time partnering countryman Chris Haggard. The pair made the round of 16, after two straight sets victories, but then fell to Ellis Ferreira and Rick Leach.

After he left the tour he became head coach of the tennis program at Birmingham–Southern College.

In 2011, he left Birmingham–Southern to become the Mountain Brook Club head tennis director.

== ATP career finals ==
=== Doubles: 1 (1–0) ===
Result	W-L	Date	Tournament	Surface	Partner	Opponents	Score
Win	1–0	Jun 1998	Bologna, Italy	Clay	(United States) Brandon Coupe	(Italy) Giorgio Galimberti (Italy) Massimo Valeri	7–6, 6–3

== Challenger titles ==
=== Doubles: (11) ===
No.	Year	Tournament	Surface	Partner	Opponents	Score
1.	1996	Scheveningen, Netherlands	Clay	(United States) Brandon Coupe	(Netherlands) Martijn Bok (Netherlands) Dennis van Scheppingen	6–1, 3–6, 6–0
2.	1997	Fürth, Germany	Clay	(United States) Brandon Coupe	(Germany) Martin Sinner (Netherlands) Joost Winnink	7–5, 6–3
3.	1997	Braunschweig, Germany	Clay	(United States) Brandon Coupe	(Federal Republic of Yugoslavia) Nebojsa Djordjevic (Mexico) Óscar Ortiz	6–4, 6–3
4.	1998	Budapest, Hungary	Clay	(South Africa) Chris Haggard	(Argentina) Diego del Río (Australia) Grant Silcock	6–4, 6–2
5.	2000	Bratislava, Slovakia	Hard	(Australia) Paul Hanley	(Israel) Jonathan Erlich (North Macedonia) Aleksandar Kitinov	6–4, 6–4
6.	2001	Bucharest, Romania	Clay	(The Bahamas) Mark Merklein	(Romania) Ionuț Moldovan (Kazakhstan) Yuri Schukin	6–4, 6–4
7.	2001	Houston, United States	Hard	(South Africa) Jeff Coetzee	(South Africa) Justin Bower (South Africa) Shaun Rudman	7–6^{(7–2)}, 6–4
8.	2001	Tyler, United States	Hard	(Australia) Stephen Huss	(United States) Mardy Fish (United States) Jeff Morrison	6–4, 6–2
9.	2002	Hamburg, Germany	Carpet	(The Bahamas) Mark Merklein	(South Africa) Wesley Moodie (South Africa) Shaun Rudman	6–3, 6–4
10.	2002	Calabasas, United States	Hard	(United States) Glenn Weiner	(United States) Justin Gimelstob (United States) Paul Goldstein	6–2, 4–6, 7–6^{(7–4)}
11.	2002	Córdoba, Spain	Hard	(Czech Republic) Ota Fukárek	(Spain) Emilio Benfele Álvarez (Federal Republic of Yugoslavia) Dušan Vemić	7–6^{(9–7)}, 6–4
