= Massimo Valeri =

Italian tennis player

- Country (sports): Italy
- Born: 13 March 1972 (age 53); Rome, Italy
- Height: 1.85 m (6 ft 1 in)
- Turned pro: 1991
- Plays: Right-handed
- Prize money: $164,828

Singles
- Career record: 3–9
- Career titles: 0
- Highest ranking: No. 137 (24 Aug 1992)

Doubles
- Career record: 5–8
- Career titles: 0
- Highest ranking: No. 116 (5 Jul 1999)

Mixed doubles

Grand Slam mixed doubles results
- US Open: 1R (1994)

Massimo Valeri (born 13 March 1972) is a former professional tennis player from Italy.

== Career ==
Valeri was a quarter-finalist in the boys' doubles event at the 1990 French Open, with Andrei Pavel, who he had beaten in the singles draw.

In 1993, Valeri had wins over two top 100 players, Richard Fromberg in Bologna and Anders Järryd in Prague.

The Italian was a mixed doubles participant in the 1994 French Open, partnering Gabriela Sabatini. They were defeated in the opening round by Kent Kinnear and Nana Miyagi.

Valeri spent most of 1995 and 1996 away from the tour, appearing in just one Challenger tournament in each of the years.

In 1998, he defeated Carlos Costa in Palermo, before being beaten in the second round by Nicolás Lapentti. His best result that season came in the Bologna Outdoor tournament, where he and Giorgio Galimberti were losing doubles finalists.

== ATP career finals ==
=== Doubles: 1 (0–1) ===
Result	W-L	Date	Tournament	Surface	Partner	Opponents	Score
Loss	0–1	Jun 1998	Bologna, Italy	Clay	(Italy) Giorgio Galimberti	(United States) Brandon Coupe (South Africa) Paul Rosner	6–7, 3–6

== Challenger titles ==
=== Singles: (2) ===
No.	Year	Tournament	Surface	Opponent	Score
1.	1991	Messina, Italy	Clay	(Spain) Germán López	4–6, 6–1, 7–6
2.	1992	Oberstaufen, Germany	Clay	(Germany) Martin Sinner	6–3, 6–3

=== Doubles: (4) ===
No.	Year	Tournament	Surface	Partner	Opponents	Score
1.	1997	Venice, Italy	Clay	(Italy) Giorgio Galimberti	(Argentina) Martín Rodríguez (Mexico) David Roditi	6–4, 0–6, 7–6
2.	1999	Ljubljana, Slovenia	Clay	(Belgium) Tom Vanhoudt	(Spain) Eduardo Nicolás (Spain) Germán Puentes	7–6^{(10–8)}, 6–4
3.	1999	Biella, Italy	Clay	(Italy) Filippo Messori	(Argentina) Agustín Calleri (Spain) Salvador Navarro	7–5, 6–4
4.	1999	Manerbio, Italy	Clay	(Austria) Thomas Strengberger	(Argentina) Federico Browne (Argentina) Francisco Cabello	6–3, 6–3
