= Marzio Martelli =

Italian tennis player

- Country (sports): Italy
- Residence: Livorno
- Born: 14 December 1971 (age 54) Valle Benedetta, Italy
- Height: 1.80 m (5 ft 11 in)
- Turned pro: 1996
- Plays: Right-handed
- Prize money: $320,131

Singles
- Career record: 19–32
- Career titles: 0
- Highest ranking: No. 96 (8 Sep 1997)

Grand Slam singles results
- Australian Open: 1R (1998)
- French Open: 2R (1998)
- Wimbledon: 2R (1997)
- US Open: 2R (1997)

Doubles
- Career record: 2–7
- Career titles: 0
- Highest ranking: No. 318 (19 May 1997)

Marzio Martelli (born 14 December 1971) is a former professional tennis player from Italy.

In 1996, Martelli reached the semi-finals of the Campionati Internazionali di Sicilia, as a qualifier. En route he defeated second seed Alberto Berasategui.

Martelli made the second round of two Grand Slams in 1997, at Wimbledon and the French Open. On the 1997 ATP Tour, he had his best result at the Bologna Outdoor tournament, beating two top 50 players on the way to a semi-final appearance. He was also a member of the Italian Davis Cup team, which won against Spain that year in the quarter-finals of the World Group. In what would be the only Davis Cup rubber he would ever play, Martelli was defeated by Carlos Moyá, but he did win the second set against the Australian Open runner-up.

He lost a four set match to Andre Agassi in the opening round of the 1998 Australian Open. In his fourth and final Grand Slam appearance, at the 1998 French Open, the Italian defeated world number 25 Goran Ivanišević in the first round but was unable to progress any further, losing his next match to Filip Dewulf. Also in 1998, Martelli put in another good Bologna Outdoor performance, reaching the quarter-finals.

== Challenger Titles ==
=== Singles: (1) ===
No.	Year	Tournament	Surface	Opponent in the final	Score in the final
1.	2001	San Benedetto, Italy	Clay	(Spain) Salvador Navarro	6–4, 6–2
