= Julián Alonso =

Spanish-American tennis player (born 1977)

- Country (sports): Spain United States
- Residence: Monte Carlo, Monaco; Miami, Florida, United States
- Born: 2 August 1977 (age 47); Canet de Mar, Spain
- Height: 1.85 m (6 ft 1 in)
- Turned pro: 1995
- Retired: 2003
- Plays: Right-handed (one-handed backhand)
- Prize money: $ 1,852,891

Singles
- Career record: 92-64
- Career titles: 2
- Highest ranking: No. 30 (15 June 1998)

Grand Slam singles results
- Australian Open: 2R (1998, 1999)
- French Open: 1R (1998, 1999)
- Wimbledon: 1R (1998, 1999)
- US Open: 1R (1997, 1998)

Doubles
- Career record: 74–48
- Career titles: 2
- Highest ranking: No. 53 (31 August 1998)

Grand Slam doubles results
- Australian Open: 1R (1998, 1999)
- French Open: QF (1998)
- US Open: 1R (1998)

Grand Slam mixed doubles results
- French Open: 1R (1998)
- Last updated on: 3 April 2022.

Julián Alonso Pintor (Spanish pronunciation: [xuˈljan aˈlonso pinˈtoɾ]; born 2 August 1977) is a Spanish-American former professional tennis player, who turned professional in 1995 and retired in 2003. He was known in tennis because of his powerful serve and Forehand compared with the Goran Ivanišević´s service. In 1997, playing against Ivanisevic (2nd seeded), in Long Island, beat him for first Top 10 victory en route to semifinal and in that match fired a 143 mph serve to become just third player (Philippoussis, Rusedski) to register a serve of at least 143. He is the founder of ELITE TENNIS TEAM focusing on junior development and also is coaching pro players Leylah Fernandez, Arantxa Rus as many others before like, Qinwen Zheng, Mirjana Lučić-Baroni, Sabine Lisicki, Ajla Tomljanović, Varvara Lepchenko, Renata Zarazúa, Marco Cecchinato and Nicolas Almagro.

Married to Arantxa Vivanco and father of two children.

== Tennis career ==
Alonso was awarded the ATP Newcomer of the Year prize after winning his first ATP title in Santiago and finishing in the Top 30 in 1997. In the final of the tournament, he defeated Marcelo Ríos, World No. 1 ranking 6–1, 6–2 in 46 min. Previously, that same year, Tim Henman after being defeated by Alonso at "The Lipton" Key Biscayne (current Miami open) declared: "Julian will be the next number 1 in the World before Wimbledon"

After this promising start, however, his career is considered underwhelming; he only won one more title (Bologna, 1998) and retired in 2003 after half year playing only Challengers. He confessed that the decline of his career started with the relationship with Martina Hingis. The pressure of the media and his mother-in-law made Alonso's ranking and self-confidence fall. He reached his career-high ATP singles ranking of world No. 29 in June 1998 (after winning his second and final title). He used to play doubles in Davis Cup Spanish team with Joan Balcells during Manolo Santana captaincy, and several single matches.

== ATP career finals ==
=== Singles: 3 (2 titles, 1 runner-up) ===
Legend Grand Slam Tournaments (0–0) ATP World Tour Finals (0–0) ATP Masters Series (0–0) ATP Championship Series (0–0) ATP World Series (2–1)	Finals by surface Hard (0–0) Clay (2–1) Grass (0–0) Carpet (0–0)	Finals by setting Outdoors (2–1) Indoors (0–0)

Result	W–L	Date	Tournament	Tier	Surface	Opponent	Score
Loss	0–1	Jul 1997	Kitzbühel, Austria	World Series	Clay	(Belgium) Filip Dewulf	6–7^{(2–7)}, 4–6, 1–6
Win	1–1	Nov 1997	Santiago, Chile	World Series	Clay	(Chile) Marcelo Ríos	6–2, 6–1
Win	2–1	Jun 1998	Bologna, Italy	World Series	Clay	(Morocco) Karim Alami	6–1, 6–4

=== Doubles: 3 (2 titles, 1 runner-up) ===
Legend Grand Slam Tournaments (0–0) ATP World Tour Finals (0–0) ATP Masters Series (0–0) ATP Championship Series (0–0) ATP World Series (2–1)	Finals by surface Hard (1–0) Clay (1–1) Grass (0–0) Carpet (0–0)	Finals by setting Outdoors (2–1) Indoors (0–0)

Result	W–L	Date	Tournament	Tier	Surface	Partner	Opponents	Score
Win	1–0	Sep 1997	Marbella, Spain	World Series	Clay	(Morocco) Karim Alami	(Spain) Alberto Berasategui (Spain) Jordi Burillo	4–6, 6–3, 6–0
Loss	1–1	Nov 1997	Santiago, Chile	World Series	Clay	(Ecuador) Nicolás Lapentti	(Netherlands) Hendrik Jan Davids (Australia) Andrew Kratzmann	6–7, 7–5, 4–6
Win	2–1	Aug 1998	Long Island, United States	International Series	Hard	(Spain) Javier Sánchez	(United States) Brandon Coupe (United States) Dave Randall	6–4, 6–4

== ATP Challenger and ITF Futures finals ==
=== Singles: 4 (2–2) ===
Legend ATP Challenger (2–2) ITF Futures (0–0)	Finals by surface Hard (0–0) Clay (2–2) Grass (0–0) Carpet (0–0)

Result	W–L	Date	Tournament	Tier	Surface	Opponent	Score
Loss	0-1	May 1997	Dresden, Germany	Challenger	Clay	(Belgium) Dick Norman	4–6, 4–6
Win	1-1	Jul 1997	Venice, Italy	Challenger	Clay	(Germany) Marcello Craca	6–3, 6–7, 6–0
Win	2-1	Jul 1997	Contrexéville, France	Challenger	Clay	(Italy) Andrea Gaudenzi	6–4, 6–3
Loss	2-2	Jul 2001	Montauban, France	Challenger	Clay	(Germany) Oliver Gross	0–6, 1–4 ret.

=== Doubles: 6 (2–4) ===
Legend ATP Challenger (2–3) ITF Futures (0–1)	Finals by surface Hard (0–1) Clay (2–3) Grass (0–0) Carpet (0–0)

Result	W–L	Date	Tournament	Tier	Surface	Partner	Opponents	Score
Loss	0–1	Aug 1996	Alicante, Spain	Challenger	Clay	(Spain) Emilio Sánchez	(Spain) José Antonio Conde (Portugal) Nuno Marques	4–6, 5–7
Win	1–1	Jun 1998	Zagreb, Croatia	Challenger	Clay	(Argentina) Mariano Puerta	(Spain) Eduardo Nicolás Espin (Spain) Germán Puentes Alcañiz	6–1, 6–4
Win	2–1	Jul 2000	Venice, Italy	Challenger	Clay	(North Macedonia) Aleksandar Kitinov	(Italy) Andrea Gaudenzi (Italy) Diego Nargiso	7–6^{(7–3)}, 7–5
Loss	2–2	Jun 2001	Weiden, Germany	Challenger	Clay	(United States) Hugo Armando	(Czech Republic) Petr Kovačka (Czech Republic) Pavel Kudrnáč	walkover
Loss	2–3	Jun 2001	Andorra la Vella, Andorra	Challenger	Hard	(Spain) Jairo Velasco	(Russia) Denis Golovanov (Finland) Tuomas Ketola	3–6, 4–6
Loss	2–4	Apr 2007	Spain F15, Reus	Futures	Clay	(Spain) Gerard Granollers Pujol	(Spain) David Marrero (Spain) Pablo Santos González	4–6, 4–6

== Performance timeline ==
Key
W	F	SF	QF	#R	RR	Q#	DNQ	A	NH

(W) winner; (F) finalist; (SF) semifinalist; (QF) quarterfinalist; (#R) rounds 4, 3, 2, 1; (RR) round-robin stage; (Q#) qualification round; (DNQ) did not qualify; (A) absent; (NH) not held; (SR) strike rate (events won / competed); (W–L) win–loss record.

=== Singles ===
Tournament	1997	1998	1999	2000	2001	SR	W–L	Win %
Grand Slam tournaments
Australian Open	A	2R	2R	1R	Q1	0 / 3	2–3	40%
French Open	Q2	1R	1R	Q1	Q3	0 / 2	0–2	0%
Wimbledon	A	1R	1R	A	A	0 / 2	0–2	0%
US Open	1R	1R	A	A	A	0 / 2	0–2	0%
Win–loss	0–1	1–4	1–3	0–1	0–0	0 / 9	2–9	18%
ATP Tour Masters 1000
Indian Wells	A	1R	A	A	A	0 / 1	0–1	0%
Miami	3R	1R	A	A	A	0 / 2	2–2	50%
Monte Carlo	A	1R	A	A	A	0 / 1	0–1	0%
Hamburg	A	1R	A	A	A	0 / 1	0–1	0%
Rome	A	1R	A	A	A	0 / 1	0–1	0%
Win–loss	2–1	0–5	0–0	0–0	0–0	0 / 6	2–6	25%

=== Doubles ===
Tournament	1998	1999	SR	W–L	Win %
Grand Slam tournaments
Australian Open	1R	1R	0 / 2	0–2	0%
French Open	QF	1R	0 / 2	3–2	60%
Wimbledon	A	A	0 / 0	0–0	–
US Open	1R	A	0 / 1	0–1	0%
Win–loss	3–3	0–2	0 / 5	3–5	38%
ATP Tour Masters 1000
Indian Wells	Q2	A	0 / 0	0–0	–
Miami	1R	A	0 / 1	0–1	0%
Monte Carlo	2R	A	0 / 1	1–1	50%
Hamburg	1R	A	0 / 1	0–1	0%
Rome	1R	A	0 / 1	0–1	0%
Win–loss	1–4	0–0	0 / 4	1–4	20%

Awards
Preceded by Dominik Hrbatý	ATP Newcomer of the Year; 1997	Succeeded by Marat Safin
