= Jacobo Díaz =

Spanish tennis player (born 1976)

- Country (sports): Spain
- Residence: Madrid, Spain
- Born: 11 July 1976 (age 48); Madrid, Spain
- Height: 1.73 m (5 ft 8 in)
- Turned pro: 1995
- Retired: 2004
- Plays: Right-handed (one-handed backhand)
- Prize money: $689,680

Singles
- Career record: 28–62
- Career titles: 0; 3 Challenger, 2 Futures
- Highest ranking: No. 68 (25 June 2001)

Grand Slam singles results
- Australian Open: 1R (1998, 2000, 2001, 2002, 2003)
- French Open: 3R (2001)
- Wimbledon: 1R (2001)
- US Open: 1R (1999, 2001)

Doubles
- Career record: 0–3
- Career titles: 0; 0 Challenger, 0 Futures
- Highest ranking: No. 526 (1 May 1995)
- Last updated on: 13 December 2022.

Jacobo Díaz Ruiz (born 11 July 1976) is a former professional male tennis player from Spain who retired in 2004. He had a promising juniors career, highlighted by the victory at Roland Garros in 1994. The right-handed player's career-high ATP Entry ranking was World No. 68, achieved in June 2001.

== ATP Challenger and ITF Futures finals ==
=== Singles: 9 (5–4) ===
Legend ATP Challenger (3–4) ITF Futures (2–0)	Finals by surface Hard (0–0) Clay (5–4) Grass (0–0) Carpet (0–0)

Result	W–L	Date	Tournament	Tier	Surface	Opponent	Score
Loss	0–1	Jul 1996	Tampere, Finland	Challenger	Clay	(Hungary) Attila Sávolt	6–7, 6–1, 4–6
Win	1–1	Apr 1999	Barletta, Italy	Challenger	Clay	(Argentina) Guillermo Cañas	6–7^{(6–8)}, 6–0, 6–3
Loss	1–2	Apr 1999	Nice, France	Challenger	Clay	(Argentina) Gastón Gaudio	2–6, 3–6
Loss	1–3	Sep 1999	Seville, Spain	Challenger	Clay	(Argentina) Sebastián Prieto	6–4, 2–6, 1–6
Loss	1–4	Jul 2000	Venice, Italy	Challenger	Clay	(Argentina) Agustín Calleri	0–6, 1–6
Win	2–4	Aug 2000	Kyiv, Ukraine	Challenger	Clay	(Greece) Solon Peppas	6–1, 6–3
Win	3–4	May 2001	Zagreb, Croatia	Challenger	Clay	(Spain) Albert Montañés	7–6^{(7–5)}, 3–6, 6–2
Win	4–4	Jun 2004	Spain F12, Maspalomas	Futures	Clay	(Spain) Juan Giner	6–3, 7–5
Win	5–4	Jul 2004	Spain F15, Gandia	Futures	Clay	(Spain) Héctor Ruiz-Cadenas	6–4, 7–5

== Performance timeline ==
Key
W	F	SF	QF	#R	RR	Q#	P#	DNQ	A	Z#	PO	G	S	B	NMS	NTI	P	NH

(W) winner; (F) finalist; (SF) semifinalist; (QF) quarterfinalist; (#R) rounds 4, 3, 2, 1; (RR) round-robin stage; (Q#) qualification round; (P#) preliminary round; (DNQ) did not qualify; (A) absent; (Z#) Davis/Fed Cup Zonal Group (with number indication) or (PO) play-off; (G) gold, (S) silver or (B) bronze Olympic/Paralympic medal; (NMS) not a Masters tournament; (NTI) not a Tier I tournament; (P) postponed; (NH) not held; (SR) strike rate (events won / competed); (W–L) win–loss record.

=== Singles ===
Tournament	1996	1997	1998	1999	2000	2001	2002	2003	SR	W–L	Win%
Grand Slam tournaments
Australian Open	A	A	1R	Q3	1R	1R	1R	1R	0 / 5	0–5	0%
French Open	1R	Q1	Q2	Q2	1R	3R	A	Q1	0 / 3	2–3	40%
Wimbledon	A	A	A	A	A	1R	A	A	0 / 1	0–1	0%
US Open	A	A	A	1R	A	1R	A	A	0 / 2	0–2	0%
Win–loss	0–1	0–0	0–1	0–1	0–2	2–4	0–1	0–1	0 / 11	2–11	15%
ATP Tour Masters 1000
Miami	A	A	A	A	A	2R	Q1	A	0 / 1	1–1	50%
Monte Carlo	A	A	A	A	A	Q1	A	Q1	0 / 0	0–0	–
Rome	A	Q2	A	Q2	A	QF	A	A	0 / 1	3–1	75%
Hamburg	A	3R	1R	A	A	A	A	A	0 / 2	2–2	50%
Madrid	Not Masters Series						Q1	A	0 / 0	0–0	–
Win–loss	0–0	2–1	0–1	0–0	0–0	4–2	0–0	0–0	0 / 4	6–4	60%

== Junior Grand Slam Finals ==
=== Singles: 1 (1 title) ===
Result	Year	Tournament	Surface	Opponent	Score
Win	1994	French Open	Clay	(Italy) Giorgio Galimberti	6–3, 7–6

== Wins over top 10 players ==
#	Player	Rank	Event	Surface	Rd	Score
2001
1.	(Russia) Yevgeny Kafelnikov	6	Italian Open, Rome, Italy	Clay	2R	7–6^{(7–3)}, 1–6, 7–5
