= Davide Scala =

Italian tennis player

- Full name: Davide Scala
- Country (sports): Italy
- Born: 2 January 1972 (age 53); Bologna, Italy
- Plays: Right-handed
- Prize money: $168,066

Singles
- Career record: 8–13
- Career titles: 0
- Highest ranking: No. 117 (15 September 1997)

Doubles
- Career record: 0–3
- Career titles: 0
- Highest ranking: No. 336 (23 April 2001)

Davide Scala (born 2 January 1972) is a former professional tennis player from Italy.

== Biography ==
Scala, a right-handed player from Bologna, turned professional in 1990.

At the 1997 Italian Open, a top-tier tournament now known as the Rome Masters, Scala upset the world number 18 Tim Henman, en route to the third round. Playing as a qualifier, he was the only Italian to make it past the first round of the tournament.

Other noted performances include a win over American veteran Patrick McEnroe at the Washington Classic and a quarter-finals appearance at the Bournemouth International, both in 1997.

He had a career-best ranking of 117 in the world.
