= Karim Alami =

Moroccan tennis player (born 1973)

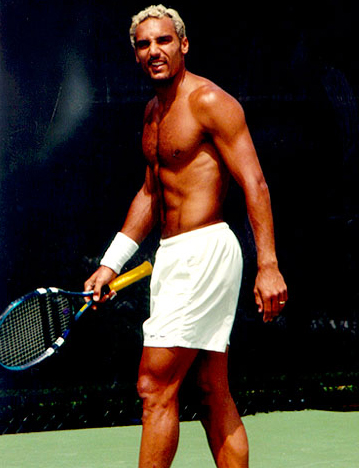
- Country (sports): Morocco
- Residence: Monte Carlo, Monaco
- Born: 24 May 1973 (age 52) Casablanca, Morocco
- Height: 1.85 m (6 ft 1 in)
- Turned pro: 1990
- Retired: 2002
- Plays: Right-handed (one-handed backhand)
- Prize money: $2,087,596

Singles
- Career record: 156–186 (45.6%)
- Career titles: 2
- Highest ranking: No. 25 (21 February 2000)

Grand Slam singles results
- Australian Open: 3R (1998, 2000)
- French Open: 3R (2001)
- Wimbledon: 2R (1994, 1999)
- US Open: 2R (1994, 2000)

Other tournaments
- Olympic Games: QF (2000)

Doubles
- Career record: 49–54 (47.6%)
- Career titles: 1
- Highest ranking: No. 130 (17 August 1998)

Grand Slam doubles results
- Australian Open: 2R (1998)
- US Open: 1R (1994)
- Last updated on: 23 November 2021.

Karim Alami (Arabic: كريم العلمي) (born 24 May 1973) is Moroccan former professional tennis player, who turned professional in 1990.

The right-hander won two career titles in singles, both in 1996 (Atlanta and Palermo), and reached a career-high ATP singles ranking of world No. 25, in February 2000. Alami reached the semifinals of the 2000 Monte Carlo Masters, defeating Magnus Norman and Albert Costa en route.

== Tennis career ==
Alami represented his native country as a qualifier at the 1992 Summer Olympics in Barcelona, where he was defeated in the first round by Switzerland's eventual winner Marc Rosset. He also reached the quarterfinals of the 2000 Summer Olympics in Sydney.

He defeated Pete Sampras in the first round of the 1994 Doha tournament, a year in which Sampras dominated the tour. He is now the Tournament Director of the Qatar ExxonMobil Open in Doha. He also works as a tennis commentator for the most popular Arabic sports channel beIN Sports.

As well as his semifinal run at the 2000 Monte-Carlo Masters, Alami reached the quarterfinals of the 1997 Rome Masters.

== Junior Grand Slam finals ==
=== Singles: 1 (1 runner-up) ===
Result	Year	Championship	Surface	Opponent	Score
Loss	1991	US Open	Hard	(India) Leander Paes	4–6, 4–6

=== Doubles: 2 (2 titles) ===
Result	Year	Championship	Surface	Partner	Opponents	Score
Win	1991	Wimbledon	Grass	(United Kingdom) Greg Rusedski	(South Africa) John-Laffnie de Jager (Ukraine) Andrei Medvedev	1–6, 7–6^{(7–4)}, 6–4
Win	1991	US Open	Hard	(South Africa) John-Laffnie de Jager	(United States) Michael Joyce (United States) Vince Spadea	6–4, 6–7, 6–1

== ATP career finals ==
=== Singles: 6 (2 titles, 4 runner-ups) ===
Legend Grand Slam Tournaments (0–0) ATP World Tour Finals (0–0) ATP Masters Series(0–0) ATP Championship Series (0–1) ATP World Series (2–3)	Finals by surface Hard (0–0) Clay (2–4) Grass (0–0) Carpet (0–0)	Finals by setting Outdoors (2–4) Indoors (0–0)

Result	W–L	Date	Tournament	Tier	Surface	Opponent	Score
Loss	0–1	Mar 1994	Casablanca, Morocco	World Series	Clay	(Italy) Renzo Furlan	2–6, 2–6
Win	1–1	Apr 1996	Atlanta, United States	World Series	Clay	(Sweden) Nicklas Kulti	6–3, 6–4
Win	2–1	Sep 1996	Palermo, Italy	World Series	Clay	(Romania) Adrian Voinea	7–5, 2–1 ret.
Loss	2–2	Jan 1998	Bologna, Italy	International Series	Clay	(Spain) Julián Alonso	1–6, 4–6
Loss	2–3	Apr 1999	Barcelona, Spain	Championship Series	Clay	(Spain) Félix Mantilla	6–7^{(2–7)}, 3–6, 3–6
Loss	2–4	Sep 1999	Bucharest, Romania	International Series	Clay	(Spain) Alberto Martín	2–6, 3–6

=== Doubles: 4 (1 title, 3 runner-ups) ===
Legend Grand Slam Tournaments (0–0) ATP World Tour Finals (0–0) ATP Masters Series(0–0) ATP Championship Series (0–0) ATP World Series (1–3)	Finals by surface Hard (0–0) Clay (1–3) Grass (0–0) Carpet (0–0)	Finals by setting Outdoors (1–3) Indoors (0–0)

Result	W–L	Date	Tournament	Tier	Surface	Partner	Opponents	Score
Loss	0–1	Jun 1996	Bologna, Italy	World Series	Clay	(Hungary) Gábor Köves	(South Africa) Brent Haygarth (South Africa) Christo van Rensburg	1–6, 4–6
Loss	0–2	Mar 1997	Casablanca, Morocco	World Series	Clay	(Morocco) Hicham Arazi	(Portugal) João Cunha e Silva (Portugal) Nuno Marques	6–7, 2–6
Win	1–2	Sep 1997	Marbella, Spain	World Series	Clay	(Spain) Julián Alonso	(Spain) Alberto Berasategui (Spain) Jordi Burillo	4–6, 6–3, 6–0
Loss	1–3	Oct 1997	Bogotá, Colombia	World Series	Clay	(Colombia) Maurice Ruah	(Argentina) Luis Lobo (Brazil) Fernando Meligeni	1–6, 3–6

== ATP Challenger and ITF Futures finals ==
=== Singles: 12 (3–9) ===
Legend ATP Challenger (3–9) ITF Futures (0–0)	Finals by surface Hard (0–0) Clay (3–9) Grass (0–0) Carpet (0–0)

Result	W–L	Date	Tournament	Tier	Surface	Opponent	Score
Loss	0–1	Jun 1995	Cali, Colombia	Challenger	Clay	(Argentina) Gastón Etlis	1–6, 6–3, 3–6
Loss	0–2	Jul 1995	Ulm, Germany	Challenger	Clay	(Germany) Carl-Uwe Steeb	6–4, 6–7, 0–6
Loss	0–3	Aug 1995	Geneva, Switzerland	Challenger	Clay	(Morocco) Younes El Aynaoui	1–6, 4–6
Win	1–3	Sep 1995	Tashkent, Uzbekistan	Challenger	Clay	(Spain) Jordi Arrese	6–4, 6–0
Loss	1–4	Apr 1996	Napoli, Italy	Challenger	Clay	(Spain) Félix Mantilla	3–6, 5–7
Loss	1–5	May 1996	Budapest, Hungary	Challenger	Clay	(Argentina) Hernán Gumy	6–2, 2–6, 3–6
Loss	1–6	Jul 1996	Ulm, Germany	Challenger	Clay	(Belgium) Kris Goossens	4–6, 0–6
Loss	1–7	Oct 1997	Cairo, Egypt	Challenger	Clay	(Spain) Alberto Berasategui	5–7, 3–6
Loss	1–8	Dec 1998	Santiago, Chile	Challenger	Clay	(Argentina) Gastón Gaudio	2–6, 6–3, 4–6
Win	2–8	Oct 1999	Cairo, Egypt	Challenger	Clay	(Belgium) Christophe Rochus	6–3, 6–1
Loss	2–9	Nov 1999	Santiago, Chile	Challenger	Clay	(Chile) Nicolás Massú	7–6, 2–6, 4–6
Win	3–9	Nov 1999	Montevideo, Uruguay	Challenger	Clay	(Spain) Galo Blanco	6–3, 6–1

=== Doubles: 2 (1–1) ===
Legend ATP Challenger (1–1) ITF Futures (0–0)	Finals by surface Hard (0–0) Clay (1–1) Grass (0–0) Carpet (0–0)

Result	W–L	Date	Tournament	Tier	Surface	Partner	Opponents	Score
Win	1–0	Jun 1994	Tashkent, Uzbekistan	Challenger	Clay	(Hungary) Sándor Noszály	(Czech Republic) Daniel Fiala (Czech Republic) Jan Kodeš Jr.	6–7, 6–4, 7–6
Loss	1–1	Jul 1995	Ulm, Germany	Challenger	Clay	(Hungary) Gábor Köves	(Argentina) Pablo Albano (Netherlands) Tom Kempers	7–6, 4–6, 4–6

== Performance timeline ==
Key
W	F	SF	QF	#R	RR	Q#	DNQ	A	NH

(W) winner; (F) finalist; (SF) semifinalist; (QF) quarterfinalist; (#R) rounds 4, 3, 2, 1; (RR) round-robin stage; (Q#) qualification round; (DNQ) did not qualify; (A) absent; (NH) not held; (SR) strike rate (events won / competed); (W–L) win–loss record.

=== Singles ===
Tournament	1991	1992	1993	1994	1995	1996	1997	1998	1999	2000	2001	2002	SR	W–L	Win %
Grand Slam tournaments
Australian Open	A	A	A	A	2R	1R	1R	3R	1R	3R	1R	Q1	0 / 7	5–7	42%
French Open	A	A	A	Q2	A	1R	1R	1R	1R	1R	3R	Q3	0 / 6	2–6	25%
Wimbledon	Q1	A	Q1	2R	A	1R	A	1R	2R	1R	A	A	0 / 5	2–5	29%
US Open	A	A	A	2R	A	1R	1R	A	1R	2R	1R	A	0 / 6	2–6	25%
Win–loss	0–0	0–0	0–0	2–2	1–1	0–4	0–3	2–3	1–4	3–4	2–3	0–0	0 / 24	11–24	31%
ATP Masters Series
Indian Wells	A	A	A	A	A	A	A	A	A	1R	A	A	0 / 1	0–1	0%
Miami	A	A	A	A	A	1R	A	A	A	2R	A	A	0 / 2	0–2	0%
Monte Carlo	A	A	A	1R	A	A	1R	1R	3R	SF	1R	A	0 / 6	6–6	50%
Rome	A	A	Q2	3R	Q3	A	QF	3R	Q1	1R	Q1	A	0 / 4	7–4	64%
Hamburg	A	A	A	A	A	A	1R	2R	1R	1R	A	A	0 / 4	1–4	20%
Canada	A	A	A	A	A	A	A	A	A	2R	A	A	0 / 1	1–1	50%
Cincinnati	A	A	A	A	A	A	A	A	A	1R	A	A	0 / 1	0–1	0%
Stuttgart	A	A	A	A	A	A	A	A	A	1R	A	A	0 / 1	0–1	0%
Win–loss	0–0	0–0	0–0	2–2	0–0	0–1	3–3	3–3	2–2	5–8	0–1	0–0	0 / 20	15–20	43%
