= Bologna Outdoor =

Defunct tennis tournament
- Event name: Bologna Outdoor (1985–98)
- Tour: Grand Prix circuit (1985–89); ATP Tour (1990–98)
- Founded: 1985
- Abolished: 1998
- Editions: 14
- Surface: Clay (1985–98)

The Bologna Outdoor, also known by its sponsored name the Internazionali di Tennis Carisbo, was a Grand Prix and ATP affiliated men's tennis tournament played from 1985 until 1998. It was held in Bologna in Italy and played on outdoor clay courts.

It was the successor event to the earlier combined outdoor clay court tournament the Bologna International held from 1951 to 1967.

== Results ==
=== Singles ===
Year	Champion	Runner-up	Score
1985	(France) Thierry Tulasne	(Italy) Claudio Panatta	6–2, 6–0
1986	(Argentina) Martín Jaite	(Italy) Paolo Canè	6–2, 4–6, 6–4
1987	(Sweden) Kent Carlsson	(Spain) Emilio Sánchez	6–2, 6–1
1988	(Argentina) Alberto Mancini	(Spain) Emilio Sánchez	7–5, 7–6
1989	(Spain) Javier Sánchez	(Argentina) Franco Davín	6–1, 6–0
1990	(Australia) Richard Fromberg	(Switzerland) Marc Rosset	4–6, 6–4, 7–6
1991	(Italy) Paolo Canè	(Sweden) Jan Gunnarsson	5–7, 6–3, 7–5
1992	(Brazil) Jaime Oncins	(Italy) Renzo Furlan	6–2, 6–4
1993	(Spain) Jordi Burillo	(Russia) Andrei Cherkasov	7–6, 6–7, 6–1
1994	(Spain) Javier Sánchez	(Spain) Alberto Berasategui	7–6, 4–6, 6–3
1995	(Chile) Marcelo Ríos	(Uruguay) Marcelo Filippini	6–2, 6–4
1996	(Spain) Alberto Berasategui	(Spain) Carlos Costa	6–3, 6–4
1997	(Spain) Félix Mantilla	(Brazil) Gustavo Kuerten	4–6, 6–2, 6–1
1998	(Spain) Julian Alonso	(Morocco) Karim Alami	6–1, 6–4

=== Doubles ===
Year	Champion	Runner-up	Score
1985	(Italy) Paolo Canè (Italy) Simone Colombo	(Spain) Jordi Arrese (Spain) Alberto Tous	7–5, 6–4
1986	(Italy) Paolo Canè (Italy) Simone Colombo	(Italy) Claudio Panatta (United States) Blaine Willenborg	6–1, 6–2
1987	(Spain) Sergio Casal (Spain) Emilio Sánchez	(Italy) Claudio Panatta (United States) Blaine Willenborg	6–3, 6–2
1988	(Spain) Emilio Sánchez (Spain) Javier Sánchez	(Switzerland) Rolf Hertzog (Switzerland) Marc Walder	6–1, 7–6
1989	(Spain) Sergio Casal (Spain) Javier Sánchez	(Sweden) Tomas Nydahl (Sweden) Jörgen Windahl	6–2, 6–3
1990	(Argentina) Gustavo Luza (West Germany) Udo Riglewski	(France) Jérôme Potier (United States) Jim Pugh	7–6, 4–6, 6–1
1991	(United States) Luke Jensen (Australia) Laurie Warder	(Brazil) Luiz Mattar (Brazil) Jaime Oncins	6–4, 7–6
1992	(United States) Luke Jensen (Australia) Laurie Warder	(Argentina) Javier Frana (Spain) Javier Sánchez	6–2, 6–3
1993	(South Africa) Danie Visser (Australia) Laurie Warder	(United States) Luke Jensen (United States) Murphy Jensen	4–6, 6–4, 6–4
1994	(Australia) John Fitzgerald (Australia) Patrick Rafter	(Czech Republic) Vojtěch Flégl (Australia) Andrew Florent	6–3, 6–3
1995	(Zimbabwe) Byron Black (United States) Jonathan Stark	(Belgium) Libor Pimek (United States) Vince Spadea	7–5, 6–3
1996	(South Africa) Brent Haygarth (South Africa) Christo van Rensburg	(Morocco) Karim Alami (Hungary) Gábor Köves	6–1, 6–4
1997	(Brazil) Gustavo Kuerten (Brazil) Fernando Meligeni	(United States) Dave Randall (United States) Jack Waite	6–2, 7–5
1998	(United States) Brandon Coupe (South Africa) Paul Rosner	(Italy) Giorgio Galimberti (Italy) Massimo Valeri	7–6, 6–3

== See also ==
- Bologna Indoor
