= Petr Korda career statistics =

Career finals
Discipline	Type	Won	Lost	Total
Singles	Grand Slam	1	1	2
Singles	ATP Finals	–	–	0
Singles	Grand Slam Cup	1	–	1
Singles	ATP 1000	1	2	3
Singles	ATP 500	2	5	7
Singles	ATP 250	5	8	13
Singles	Grand Prix	–	1	1
Singles	Olympics	–	–	0
Singles	Total	10	17	27
Doubles	Grand Slam	1	1	2
Doubles	ATP Finals	–	–	0
Doubles	Grand Slam Cup	–	–	0
Doubles	ATP 1000	3	1	4
Doubles	ATP 500	1	4	5
Doubles	ATP 250	2	4	6
Doubles	Grand Prix	3	4	7
Doubles	Olympics	–	–	0
Doubles	Total	10	14	24

This is a list of the main career statistics of former professional Czech tennis player Petr Korda.

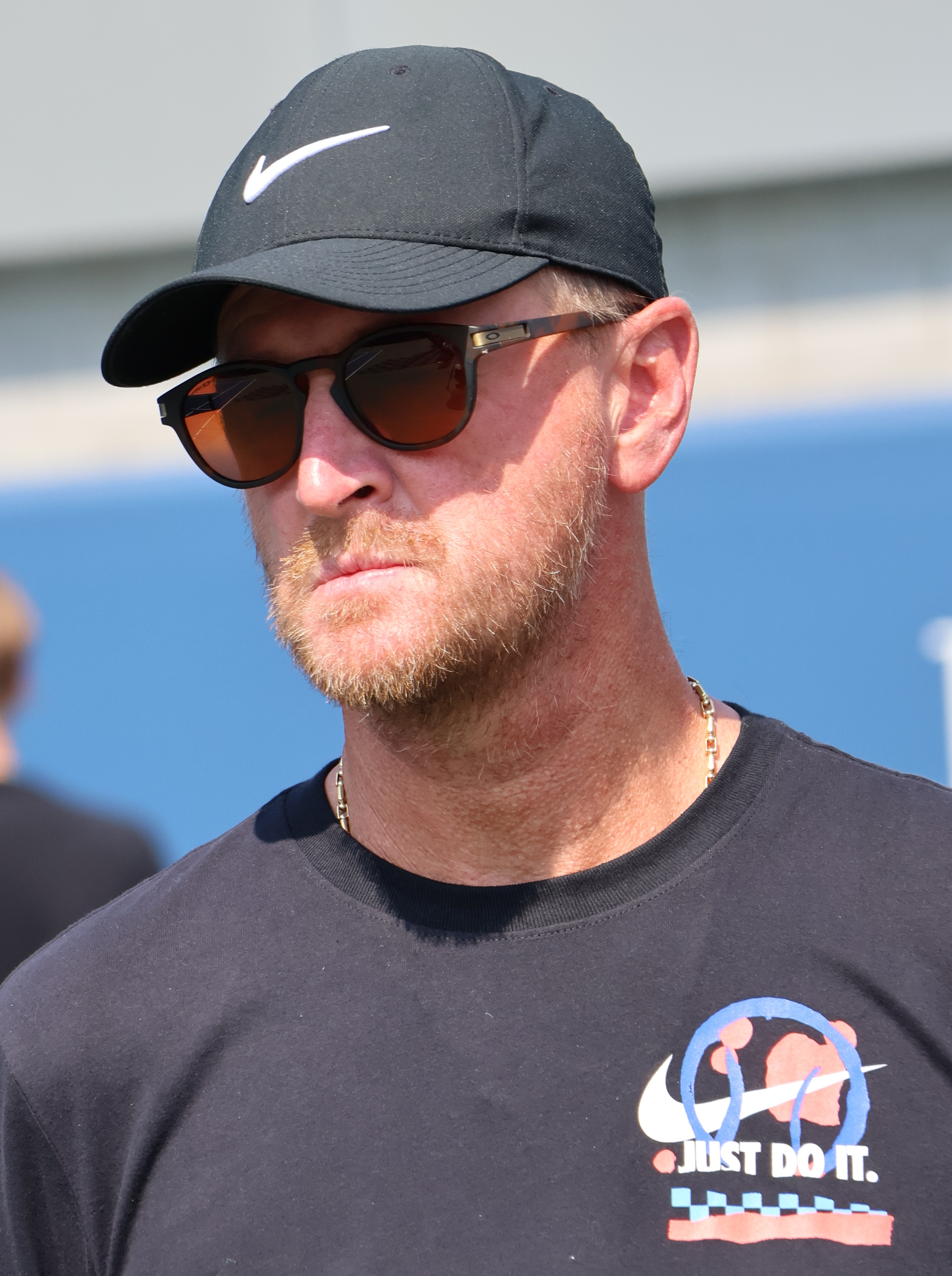
Korda in 2024

== Performance timelines ==
Key
W	F	SF	QF	#R	RR	Q#	DNQ	A	NH

(W) winner; (F) finalist; (SF) semifinalist; (QF) quarterfinalist; (#R) rounds 4, 3, 2, 1; (RR) round-robin stage; (Q#) qualification round; (DNQ) did not qualify; (A) absent; (NH) not held; (SR) strike rate (events won / competed); (W–L) win–loss record.

=== Singles ===
Tournament	1985	1986	1987	1988	1989	1990	1991	1992	1993	1994	1995	1996	1997	1998	1999	2000	SR	W–L
Grand Slam tournaments
Australian Open	A	NH	A	A	A	2R	2R	1R	QF	1R	3R	1R	1R	W	3R	A	1 / 10	17–9
French Open	A	A	A	2R	A	2R	2R	F	2R	1R	1R	3R	4R	1R	2R	A	0 / 11	15–11
Wimbledon	A	A	A	3R	A	1R	1R	2R	4R	2R	4R	A	4R	QF	Q2	A	0 / 9	17–9
US Open	A	A	A	1R	A	2R	1R	1R	1R	A	QF	3R	QF	1R	A	A	0 / 9	11–9
Win–loss	0–0	0–0	0–0	3–3	0–0	3–4	2–4	7–4	8–4	1–3	9–4	4–3	9–4	11–3	3–2	0–0	1 / 39	60–38
Year-end championship
Tennis Masters Cup	Did not qualify							RR	Did not qualify								0 / 1	0–3
Grand Slam Cup	Not Held					DNQ		QF	W	DNQ	1R	DNQ	SF	QF	DNQ	NH	1 / 5	7–4
ITF Grand Prix Circuit						ATP 1000 tournaments												
Indian Wells Masters	A	A	A	A	A	A	1R	3R	QF	F	2R	1R	A	QF	1R	A	0 / 8	11–8
Miami Masters	A	A	A	1R	A	2R	2R	3R	SF	QF	2R	4R	2R	4R	1R	A	0 / 11	14–11
Monte-Carlo Masters	A	A	A	A	A	2R	A	2R	3R	2R	1R	3R	A	QF	A	A	0 / 7	7–7
Rome Masters	A	A	A	A	A	1R	A	SF	A	A	1R	2R	A	1R	A	A	0 / 5	5–5
Hamburg Masters	A	A	A	1R	A	1R	A	2R	A	3R	2R	A	A	A	A	A	0 / 5	2–5
Canada Masters	A	A	A	A	A	2R	F	QF	SF	2R	2R	3R	1R	2R	A	A	0 / 9	13–9
Cincinnati Masters	A	A	A	A	A	1R	2R	QF	2R	2R	2R	2R	2R	QF	A	A	0 / 9	9–9
Stuttgart Masters^{1}	A	A	A	A	A	3R	QF	QF	QF	1R	A	A	W	2R	A	A	1 / 7	13–6
Paris Masters	A	A	A	A	1R	1R	QF	2R	3R	QF	A	SF	3R	2R	A	A	0 / 9	11–9
Win–loss	0–0	0–0	0–0	0–2	0–1	3–8	11–6	12–9	13–7	14–8	4–7	13–7	7–4	8–8	0–2	0–0	1 / 67	85–66
Career Statistics
Finals	0	0	0	0	1	0	5	7	3	3	0	2	3	2	0	0	27	
Titles	0	0	0	0	0	0	2	3	1	0	0	1	1	2	0	0	10	
Overall win–loss	0–1	0–0	2–1	8–13	13–8	24–27	45–24	62–30	54–23	38–22	27–23	42–19	55–24	34–21	6–12	0–0	410–248	
Win %	0%	–	66%	38%	62%	47%	65%	67%	70%	63%	54%	69%	70%	62%	33%	–	62.31%	
Year-End Ranking	794	511	87	188	59	38	9	7	12	18	41	24	13	13	–	1332		

^{1} Held as Stockholm Masters until 1994, Stuttgart Masters from 1995 to 2001.

=== Doubles ===
Tournament	1985	1986	1987	1988	1989	1990	1991	1992	1993	1994	1995	1996	1997	1998	1999	2000	2001	...	2005	SR	W–L
Grand Slam tournaments
Australian Open	A	NH	A	A	A	2R	1R	2R	1R	3R	SF	W	2R	A	A	A	A		A	1 / 8	15–7
French Open	A	A	1R	2R	2R	F	2R	QF	SF	A	1R	3R	3R	A	A	A	A		A	0 / 10	19–10
Wimbledon	A	A	A	1R	A	2R	2R	1R	A	A	A	A	A	A	A	A	A		A	0 / 4	2–4
US Open	A	A	A	A	3R	2R	3R	1R	A	A	3R	1R	1R	A	A	A	A		A	0 / 7	7–7
Win–Loss	0–0	0–0	0–1	1–2	3–2	8–4	4–4	4–4	4–2	2–1	6–3	8–2	3–3	0–0	0–0	0–0	0–0		0–0	1 / 29	43–28
ITF Grand Prix Circuit						ATP 1000 tournaments															
Indian Wells Masters	A	A	A	A	A	1R	1R	1R	1R	1R	1R	A	A	A	A	A	A		A	0 / 6	0–6
Miami Masters	A	A	A	2R	A	2R	A	QF	QF	A	QF	3R	1R	A	A	A	A		A	0 / 7	12–6
Monte-Carlo Masters	A	A	A	2R	A	W	A	F	W	1R	1R	1R	A	QF	A	A	A		A	2 / 8	16–5
Rome Masters	A	A	A	A	2R	1R	A	2R	A	A	2R	2R	A	A	A	A	A		A	0 / 5	4–5
Hamburg Masters	A	A	1R	2R	A	2R	A	2R	A	A	A	A	A	A	A	A	A		A	0 / 4	3–4
Canada Masters	A	A	A	A	A	1R	2R	A	A	1R	1R	2R	A	A	A	A	A		A	0 / 5	2–5
Cincinnati Masters	A	A	A	A	A	2R	1R	1R	W	2R	1R	1R	1R	~~2R~~	A	A	A		A	1 / 9	8–7
Stuttgart Masters^{1}	A	A	A	A	A	QF	A	A	A	A	A	2R	A	A	A	A	A		A	0 / 2	2–2
Paris Masters	A	A	A	A	1R	1R	A	A	2R	A	A	QF	A	A	A	A	A		A	0 / 4	3–4
Win–Loss	0–0	0–0	0–1	3–3	1–2	9–8	1–3	9–6	14–3	1–4	4–5	7–7	0–2	3–0	0–0	0–0	0–0		0–0	3 / 44	48–38
Year-End Ranking	–	296	91	46	26	15	63	64	32	115	44	23	220	321	–	1009	1536	–	1683		

^{1} Held as Stockholm Masters until 1994, Stuttgart Masters from 1995 to 2001.

== Grand Slam tournaments finals ==
=== Singles: 2 (1 title, 1 runner-up) ===
Result	Year	Tournament	Surface	Opponent	Score
Loss	1992	French Open	Clay	(United States) Jim Courier	5–7, 2–6, 1–6
Win	1998	Australian Open	Hard	(Chile) Marcelo Ríos	6–2, 6–2, 6–2

=== Doubles: 2 (1 title, 1 runner-up) ===
Result	Year	Tournament	Surface	Partner	Opponents	Score
Loss	1990	French Open	Clay	(Socialist Federal Republic of Yugoslavia) Goran Ivanišević	(Spain) Sergio Casal (Spain) Emilio Sánchez Vicario	5–7, 3–6
Win	1996	Australian Open	Hard	(Sweden) Stefan Edberg	(Canada) Sébastien Lareau (United States) Alex O'Brien	7–5, 7–5, 4–6, 6–1

== Other significant finals ==
=== Grand Slam Cup ===
==== Singles: 1 (title) ====
Result	Year	Tournament	Surface	Opponent	Score
Win	1993	Grand Slam Cup, Munich	Carpet (i)	(Germany) Michael Stich	2–6, 6–4, 7–6^{(7–5)}, 2–6, 11–9

=== Singles: 3 (1 title, 2 runner-ups) ===
Result	Year	Tournament	Surface	Opponent	Score
Loss	1991	Canada Masters	Hard	(Soviet Union) Andrei Chesnokov	6–3, 4–6, 3–6
Loss	1994	Indian Wells Masters	Hard	(United States) Pete Sampras	6–4, 3–6, 6–3, 3–6, 2–6
Win	1997	Stuttgart Masters	Carpet (i)	(Netherlands) Richard Krajicek	7–6^{(8–6)}, 6–2, 6–4

=== Doubles: 4 (3 titles, 1 runner-up) ===
Result	Year	Tournament	Surface	Partner	Opponent	Score
Win	1990	Monte-Carlo Masters	Clay	(Czechoslovakia) Tomáš Šmíd	(Ecuador) Andrés Gómez (Spain) Javier Sánchez	6–4, 7–6
Loss	1992	Monte-Carlo Masters	Clay	(Czechoslovakia) Karel Nováček	(Germany) Boris Becker (Germany) Michael Stich	4–6, 4–6
Win	1993	Monte-Carlo Masters	Clay	(Sweden) Stefan Edberg	(Netherlands) Paul Haarhuis (Netherlands) Mark Koevermans	3–6, 6–2, 7–6
Win	1993	Cincinnati Masters	Hard	(United States) Andre Agassi	(Sweden) Stefan Edberg (Sweden) Henrik Holm	7–6, 6–4

== ATP Tour finals ==
=== Singles: 27 (10 titles, 17 runners-up) ===
Legend Grand Slam (1–1) Grand Slam Cup (1–0) 1000 (ATP Championship Series, Single Week / Super 9) (1–2) 500 (ATP Championship Series) (2–5) 250 (ATP World Series) (5–8) Grand Prix (0–1)	Titles by surface Hard (6–8) Clay (0–4) Grass (0–1) Carpet (4–4)

Result	W–L	Date	Tournament	Tier	Surface	Opponent	Score
Loss	0–1	Oct 1989	Frankfurt, West Germany	Grand Prix	Carpet	(United States) Kevin Curren	2–6, 5–7
Loss	0–2	May 1991	Tampa, US		Clay	(United States) Richey Reneberg	6–4, 4–6, 2–6
Loss	0–3	Jul 1991	Washington, D.C., US		Hard	(United States) Andre Agassi	3–6, 4–6
Loss	0–4	Jul 1991	Montreal, Canada		Hard	(Soviet Union) Andrei Chesnokov	6–3, 4–6, 3–6
Win	1–4	Aug 1991	New Haven, US		Hard	(Socialist Federal Republic of Yugoslavia) Goran Ivanišević	6–4, 6–2
Win	2–4	Oct 1991	Berlin, Germany		Carpet	(France) Arnaud Boetsch	6–3, 6–4
Loss	2–5	May 1992	Munich, Germany		Clay	(Sweden) Magnus Larsson	4–6, 6–4, 1–6
Loss	2–6	Jun 1992	French Open, Paris		Clay	(United States) Jim Courier	5–7, 2–6, 1–6
Win	3–6	Jul 1992	Washington, D.C., US		Hard	(Sweden) Henrik Holm	6–4, 6–4
Win	4–6	Aug 1992	Long Island, US		Hard	(Czechoslovakia) Ivan Lendl	6–2, 6–2
Loss	4–7	Oct 1992	Basel, Switzerland		Hard (i)	(Germany) Boris Becker	6–3, 3–6, 2–6, 4–6
Loss	4–8	Oct 1992	Toulouse, France		Hard (i)	(France) Guy Forget	3–6, 2–6
Win	5–8	Oct 1992	Vienna, Austria		Carpet	(Italy) Gianluca Pozzi	6–3, 6–2, 5–7, 6–1
Loss	5–9	Aug 1993	New Haven, US		Hard	(Ukraine) Andrei Medvedev	5–7, 4–6
Loss	5–10	Oct 1993	Sydney, Australia		Hard (i)	(Peru) Jaime Yzaga	2–6, 6–4, 6–7^{(4–7)}, 6–7^{(7–9)}
Win	6–10	Dec 1993	Grand Slam Cup, Munich, Germany		Carpet	(Germany) Michael Stich	2–6, 6–4, 7–6^{(7–5)}, 2–6, 11–9
Loss	6–11	Feb 1994	Milan, Italy		Carpet	(Germany) Boris Becker	2–6, 6–3, 3–6
Loss	6–12	Mar 1994	Indian Wells, US		Hard	(United States) Pete Sampras	6–4, 3–6, 6–3, 3–6, 2–6
Loss	6–13	May 1994	Munich, Germany		Clay	(Germany) Michael Stich	2–6, 6–2, 3–6
Win	7–13	Jan 1996	Doha, Qatar		Hard	(Morocco) Younes El Aynaoui	7–6^{(7–5)}, 2–6, 7–6^{(7–5)}
Loss	7–14	Jul 1996	Ostrava, Czech Republic		Carpet	(Germany) David Prinosil	1–6, 2–6
Loss	7–15	Jun 1997	Halle, Germany		Grass	(Russia) Yevgeny Kafelnikov	6–7^{(2–7)}, 7–6^{(7–5)}, 6–7^{(7–9)}
Loss	7–16	Jul 1997	Washington, D.C., US		Hard	(United States) Michael Chang	7–5, 2–6, 1–6
Win	8–16	Oct 1997	Stuttgart, Germany		Carpet	(Netherlands) Richard Krajicek	7–6^{(8–6)}, 6–2, 6–4
Loss	8–17	Nov 1997	Moscow, Russia		Carpet	(Russia) Yevgeny Kafelnikov	6–7^{(2–7)}, 4–6
Win	9–17	Jan 1998	Doha, Qatar		Hard	(France) Fabrice Santoro	6–0, 6–3
Win	10–17	Feb 1998	Australian Open, Melbourne		Hard	(Chile) Marcelo Ríos	6–2, 6–2, 6–2

=== Doubles: 24 (10 titles, 14 runners-up) ===
Legend Grand Slam (1–1) 1000 (ATP Championship Series, Single Week / Super 9) (3–1) 500 (ATP Championship Series) (1–4) 250 (ATP World Series) (2–4) Grand Prix (3–4)	Titles by surface Hard (3–4) Clay (5–9) Grass (1–0) Carpet (1–1)

Result	W–L	Date	Tournament	Tier	Surface	Partner	Opponents	Score
Loss	0–1	Oct 1987	Palermo, Italy		Clay	(Czechoslovakia) Tomáš Šmíd	(Mexico) Leonardo Lavalle (Italy) Claudio Panatta	6–3, 4–6, 4–6
Win	1–1	Jul 1988	Gstaad, Switzerland		Clay	(Czechoslovakia) Milan Šrejber	(Ecuador) Andrés Gómez (Spain) Emilio Sánchez	7–6, 7–6
Win	2–1	Aug 1988	Prague, Czechoslovakia		Clay	(Czechoslovakia) Jaroslav Navrátil	(Austria) Thomas Muster (Austria) Horst Skoff	7–5, 7–6
Loss	2–2	Jul 1989	Gstaad, Switzerland		Clay	(Czechoslovakia) Milan Šrejber	(Brazil) Cássio Motta (United States) Todd Witsken	4–6, 3–6
Win	3–2	Jul 1989	Stuttgart, West Germany		Clay	(Czechoslovakia) Tomáš Šmíd	(Romania) Florin Segărceanu (Czechoslovakia) Cyril Suk	6–3, 6–4
Loss	3–3	Aug 1989	Kitzbühel, Austria		Clay	(Czechoslovakia) Tomáš Šmíd	(Spain) Emilio Sánchez (Spain) Javier Sánchez	5–7, 6–7
Loss	3–4	Aug 1989	Prague, Czechoslovakia		Clay	(United States) Gene Mayer	(Spain) Jordi Arrese (Austria) Horst Skoff	4–6, 4–6
Win	4–4	Apr 1990	Monte-Carlo, Monaco		Clay	(Czechoslovakia) Tomáš Šmíd	(Ecuador) Andrés Gómez (Spain) Javier Sánchez	6–4, 7–6
Loss	4–5	May 1990	Munich, West Germany		Clay	(Czechoslovakia) Tomáš Šmíd	(West Germany) Udo Riglewski (West Germany) Michael Stich	1–6, 4–6
Loss	4–6	Jun 1990	French Open, Paris, France		Clay	(Socialist Federal Republic of Yugoslavia) Goran Ivanišević	(Spain) Sergio Casal (Spain) Emilio Sánchez	5–7, 3–6
Loss	4–7	Aug 1990	New Haven, US		Hard	(Socialist Federal Republic of Yugoslavia) Goran Ivanišević	(United States) Jeff Brown (United States) Scott Melville	6–2, 5–7, 0–6
Win	5–7	Aug 1991	New Haven, US		Hard	(Australia) Wally Masur	(United States) Jeff Brown (United States) Scott Melville	W/O
Win	6–7	Oct 1991	Berlin, Germany		Carpet	(Czechoslovakia) Karel Nováček	(Netherlands) Jan Siemerink (Czechoslovakia) Daniel Vacek	3–6, 7–5, 7–5
Loss	6–8	Sep 1991	Basel, Switzerland		Hard (i)	(United States) John McEnroe	(Switzerland) Jakob Hlasek (United States) Patrick McEnroe	6–3, 6–7, 6–7
Loss	6–9	Apr 1992	Monte-Carlo, Monaco		Clay	(Czechoslovakia) Karel Nováček	(Germany) Boris Becker (Germany) Michael Stich	4–6, 4–6
Loss	6–10	Jul 1992	Gstaad, Switzerland		Clay	(Czechoslovakia) Cyril Suk	(Netherlands) Hendrik Jan Davids (Belgium) Libor Pimek	W/O
Win	7–10	Apr 1993	Monte-Carlo, Monaco		Clay	(Sweden) Stefan Edberg	(Netherlands) Paul Haarhuis (Netherlands) Mark Koevermans	3–6, 6–2, 7–6
Win	8–10	Jun 1993	Halle, Germany		Grass	(Czech Republic) Cyril Suk	(United States) Mike Bauer (Germany) Marc-Kevin Goellner	7–6, 5–7, 6–3
Win	9–10	Aug 1993	Cincinnati, US		Hard	(United States) Andre Agassi	(Sweden) Stefan Edberg (Sweden) Henrik Holm	7–6, 6–4
Loss	9–11	May 1994	Munich, Germany		Clay	(Germany) Boris Becker	(Russia) Yevgeny Kafelnikov (Czech Republic) David Rikl	6–7, 5–7
Loss	9–12	Feb 1995	Milan, Italy		Carpet	(Czech Republic) Karel Nováček	(Germany) Boris Becker (France) Guy Forget	2–6, 4–6
Loss	9–13	Jul 1995	Washington, D.C., US		Hard	(Czech Republic) Cyril Suk	(France) Olivier Delaître (United States) Jeff Tarango	6–1, 3–6, 2–6
Win	10–13	Jan 1996	Australian Open, Melbourne, Australia		Hard	(Sweden) Stefan Edberg	(Canada) Sébastien Lareau (United States) Alex O'Brien	7–5, 7–5, 4–6, 6–1
Loss	10–14	Aug 1996	Indianapolis, US		Hard	(Czech Republic) Cyril Suk	(United States) Jim Grabb (United States) Richey Reneberg	6–7, 6–4, 4–6

== ITF Junior Circuit ==
=== Junior Grand Slam finals ===
==== Doubles: 1 (1 title, 1 runner-up) ====
Result	Year	Tournament	Surface	Partner	Opponents	Score
Loss	1985	Wimbledon	Grass	(Czech Republic) Cyril Suk	(Mexico) Agustín Moreno (Peru) Jaime Yzaga	6–7^{(3–7)}, 4–6
Win	1986	Wimbledon	Grass	(Spain) Tomás Carbonell	(Australia) Shane Barr (Canada) Hubert Karrasch	6–1, 6–1

== Top 10 wins ==
Season	1990	1991	1992	1993	1994	1995	1996	1997	1998	Total
Wins	2	4	7	8	6	1	2	4	3	37

No.	Player	Rk	Event	Surface	Rd	Score	Rk	Years	Ref
1.	(United States) Jay Berger	10	Philadelphia, United States	Carpet (i)	QF	7–6, 6–1	53	1990	
2.	(United States) Brad Gilbert	5	Davis Cup, Prague, Czechoslovakia	Carpet (i)	RR	6–2, 6–3, 6–3	26	1990	
3.	(United States) Andre Agassi	6	Montreal, Canada	Hard	2R	7–6^{(7–3)}, 6–2	40	1991	
4.	(United States) Jim Courier	5	Montreal, Canada	Hard	SF	3–6, 7–6^{(7–1)}, 6–2	40	1991	
5.	(Czechoslovakia) Ivan Lendl	5	Stockholm, Sweden	Carpet (i)	3R	5–7, 6–1, 6–4	13	1991	
6.	(Spain) Sergi Bruguera	9	Paris, France	Carpet (i)	3R	6–2, 6–4	11	1991	
7.	(United States) Pete Sampras	4	Davis Cup, Fort Myers, United States	Hard	RR	6–4, 6–3, 2–6, 6–3	10	1992	
8.	(United States) Pete Sampras	4	Rome, Italy	Clay	QF	1–6, 7–6^{(7–4)}, 6–3	9	1992	
9.	(Germany) Michael Stich	5	World Team Cup, Düsseldorf, Germany	Clay	RR	6–3, 6–2	8	1992	
10.	(United States) Pete Sampras	3	World Team Cup, Düsseldorf, Germany	Clay	RR	6–3, 6–1	8	1992	
11.	(Sweden) Stefan Edberg	2	Long Island, United States	Hard	SF	7–5, 7–5	6	1992	
12.	(United States) Ivan Lendl	9	Long Island, United States	Hard	F	6–2, 6–2	6	1992	
13.	(United States) Ivan Lendl	9	Basel, Switzerland	Hard (i)	SF	6–4, 6–3	7	1992	
14.	(Sweden) Stefan Edberg	3	Miami, United States	Hard	QF	7–6^{(7–3)}, 7–6^{(7–5)}	5	1993	
15.	(Germany) Michael Stich	10	World Team Cup, Düsseldorf, Germany	Clay	RR	7–6^{(7–0)}, 6–1	6	1993	
16.	(Sweden) Stefan Edberg	3	World Team Cup, Düsseldorf, Germany	Clay	RR	6–1, 6–1	6	1993	
17.	(Germany) Michael Stich	7	Davis Cup, Halle, Germany	Grass	RR	6–2, 7–6^{(7–5)}	9	1993	
18.	(United States) Ivan Lendl	7	Montreal, Canada	Hard	QF	7–6^{(7–4)}, 6–1	11	1993	
19.	(Spain) Sergi Bruguera	4	Grand Slam Cup, Munich, Germany	Carpet (i)	QF	4–6, 6–0, 6–4	12	1993	
20.	(United States) Pete Sampras	1	Grand Slam Cup, Munich, Germany	Carpet (i)	SF	3–6, 7–6^{(7–3)}, 3–6, 7–6^{(12–10)}, 13–11	12	1993	
21.	(Germany) Michael Stich	2	Grand Slam Cup, Munich, Germany	Carpet (i)	F	2–6, 6–4, 7–6^{(7–5)}, 2–6, 11–9	12	1993	
22.	(Croatia) Goran Ivanišević	7	Milan, Italy	Carpet (i)	QF	6–4, 4–6, 6–2	14	1994	
23.	(Spain) Sergi Bruguera	4	Milan, Italy	Carpet (i)	SF	4–6, 6–1, 6–4	14	1994	
24.	(United States) Todd Martin	9	Indian Wells, United States	Hard	3R	6–4, 3–6, 6–2	14	1994	
25.	(Sweden) Magnus Gustafsson	10	Munich, Germany	Clay	QF	6–4, 6–4	13	1994	
26.	(Sweden) Stefan Edberg	3	World Team Cup, Düsseldorf, Germany	Clay	RR	6–1, 6–4	12	1994	
27.	(Sweden) Stefan Edberg	6	Paris, France	Carpet (i)	2R	4–6, 6–1, 6–4	20	1994	
28.	(United States) Michael Chang	5	Wimbledon, London, United Kingdom	Grass	2R	6–4, 6–4, 6–4	56	1995	
29.	(Croatia) Goran Ivanišević	5	Ostrava, Czech Republic	Carpet (i)	2R	7–6^{(7–5)}, 6–2	49	1996	
30.	(Chile) Marcelo Ríos	10	Paris, France	Carpet (i)	2R	6–3, 6–4	37	1996	
31.	(Austria) Thomas Muster	4	Halle, Germany	Grass	QF	6–3, 6–4	27	1997	
32.	(United States) Pete Sampras	1	US Open, New York, United States	Hard	4R	6–7^{(4–7)}, 7–5, 7–6^{(7–2)}, 3–6, 7–6^{(7–3)}	16	1997	
33.	(Chile) Marcelo Ríos	10	Stuttgart, Germany	Carpet (i)	QF	6–3, 6–4	17	1997	
34.	(Australia) Pat Rafter	3	Stuttgart, Germany	Carpet (i)	SF	6–4, 7–6^{(7–3)}	17	1997	
35.	(Sweden) Jonas Björkman	4	Australian Open, Melbourne, Australia	Hard	QF	3–6, 5–7, 6–3, 6–4, 6–2	7	1998	
36.	(Chile) Marcelo Ríos	8	Australian Open, Melbourne, Australia	Hard	F	6–2, 6–2, 6–2	7	1998	
37.	(Sweden) Jonas Björkman	7	World Team Cup, Düsseldorf, Germany	Clay	RR	6–3, 6–1	2	1998	

- Key: (Rk) first use, opponent rank; (Rd) round; (Rk) 2nd use, player rank; (Ref) reference; (F) final; (SF) semifinal; (QF) quarterfinal; (#R) rounds 4, 3, 2, 1; (RR) round-robin stage; (Q#) qualifying rounds or stages (3), 2, 1.
