= 1993 BMW Open – Doubles =

Doubles
- 1993 BMW Open

Final
- Champions: (Czech Republic) Martin Damm (Sweden) Henrik Holm
- Runners-up: (Czech Republic) Karel Nováček (Germany) Carl-Uwe Steeb
- Score: 6–0, 3–6, 7–5

Events
Singles	Doubles
← 1992 ·	BMW Open	· 1994 →

David Adams and Menno Oosting were the defending champions, but did not participate this year.

Martin Damm and Henrik Holm won the title, defeating Karel Nováček and Carl-Uwe Steeb 6–0, 3–6, 7–5 in the final.

== Seeds ==
1. (Germany) Udo Riglewski / (Germany) Michael Stich (quarterfinals)
2. (Netherlands) Hendrik Jan Davids / (Spain) Javier Sánchez (first round)
3. (Czech Republic) Martin Damm / (Sweden) Henrik Holm (champions)
4. (Czech Republic) Karel Nováček / (Germany) Carl-Uwe Steeb (final)

== Draw ==
=== Key ===
- Q = Qualifier
- WC = Wild card
- LL = Lucky loser
- Alt = Alternate
- SE = Special exempt
- PR = Protected ranking
- ITF = ITF entry
- JE = Junior exempt
- w/o = Walkover
- r = Retired
- d = Defaulted
- SR = Special ranking

=== Draw ===
First round
1	(Germany) U Riglewski (Germany) M Stich	6	6
(Australia) C Limberger (Czech Republic) T Anzari	3	3
(Germany) M-K Goellner (Germany) D Prinosil	5	6	4
(Belgium) L Pimek (United States) J Pugh	7	4	6
3	(Czech Republic) M Damm (Sweden) H Holm	6	7
WC	(Germany) D Dier (Germany) J Renzenbrink	1	5
(France) A Boetsch (Netherlands) S Groen	7	3	4
Q	(Sweden) N Holm (Sweden) L-A Wahlgren	5	6	6
(Sweden) J Donar (Sweden) O Jonsson	1	6
(United States) D Eisenman (United States) T Mercer	6	7
(Czech Republic) V Flégl (United States) M Jensen	6	3	6
4	(Czech Republic) K Nováček (Germany) C-U Steeb	1	6	7
WC	(Germany) B Karbacher (Germany) M Naewie	6	7
(United States) M Bauer (Denmark) M Mortensen	4	6
(Sweden) R Båthman (Sweden) T Svantesson	6	6
2	(Netherlands) HJ Davids (Spain) J Sánchez	3	3

Quarterfinals
1	(Germany) U Riglewski (Germany) M Stich	3	6	2
(Belgium) L Pimek (United States) J Pugh	6	3	6
3	(Czech Republic) M Damm (Sweden) H Holm	6	5	7
Q	(Sweden) N Holm (Sweden) L-A Wahlgren	4	7	6
(United States) D Eisenman (United States) T Mercer	2	4
4	(Czech Republic) K Nováček (Germany) C-U Steeb	6	6
WC	(Germany) B Karbacher (Germany) M Naewie	6	5	6
(Sweden) R Båthman (Sweden) T Svantesson	3	7	4

Semifinals
(Belgium) L Pimek (United States) J Pugh	6	5
3	(Czech Republic) M Damm (Sweden) H Holm	7	7
4	(Czech Republic) K Nováček (Germany) C-U Steeb	6	6
WC	(Germany) B Karbacher (Germany) M Naewie	4	2

Final
3	(Czech Republic) M Damm (Sweden) H Holm	6	3	7
4	(Czech Republic) K Nováček (Germany) C-U Steeb	0	6	5
