= 1993 BMW Open – Singles =

Singles
- 1993 BMW Open

Final
- Champion: (United States) Ivan Lendl
- Runner-up: (Germany) Michael Stich
- Score: 7–6^{(7–2)}, 6–3

Details
- Draw: 32
- Seeds: 8

Events
Singles	Doubles
← 1992 ·	BMW Open	· 1994 →

Magnus Larsson was the defending champion, but lost in the first round this year.

Ivan Lendl won the title, defeating Michael Stich 7–6^{(7–2)}, 6–3 in the final.

== Seeds ==
1. (Czech Republic) Petr Korda (second round)
2. (United States) Ivan Lendl (champion)
3. (Germany) Michael Stich (final)
4. (Ukraine) Andrei Medvedev (first round)
5. (Austria) Thomas Muster (second round)
6. (Czech Republic) Karel Nováček (quarterfinals)
7. (Sweden) Henrik Holm (first round)
8. (France) Arnaud Boetsch (quarterfinals)

== Draw ==
=== Key ===
- Q = Qualifier
- WC = Wild card
- LL = Lucky loser
- Alt = Alternate
- SE = Special exempt
- PR = Protected ranking
- ITF = ITF entry
- JE = Junior exempt
- w/o = Walkover
- r = Retired
- d = Defaulted
- SR = Special ranking

=== Finals ===
Semifinals
(Spain) José Francisco Altur	1	4
3	(Germany) Michael Stich	6	6
(France) Cédric Pioline	6	6^{1}	1^{r}
2	(United States) Ivan Lendl	1	7^{7}	0

Final
3	(Germany) Michael Stich	6^{2}	3
2	(United States) Ivan Lendl	7^{7}	6

=== Top half ===
First round
1	(Czech Republic) P Korda	7	6
(Sweden) M Larsson	5	4
Q	(Germany) D Dier	3	6^{3}
(Spain) J F Altur	6	7^{7}
(Russia) A Cherkasov	7^{7}	7^{7}
(Denmark) K Carlsen	6^{4}	6^{5}
WC	(Germany) J Renzenbrink	2	0
8	(France) A Boetsch	6	6
3	(Germany) M Stich	6	6
(Germany) B Karbacher	3	3
Q	(Slovakia) K Kučera	6	6
(Sweden) L Jonsson	2	4
(Sweden) T Enqvist	5	5
(Czech Republic) M Damm	7	7
(Sweden) C Bergström	4	4
6	(Czech Republic) K Nováček	6	6

Second round
1	(Czech Republic) P Korda	7	3	3
(Spain) J F Altur	5	6	6
(Russia) A Cherkasov	5	3
8	(France) A Boetsch	7	6
3	(Germany) M Stich	6	7
Q	(Slovakia) K Kučera	0	5
(Czech Republic) M Damm	2	3
6	(Czech Republic) K Nováček	6	6

Quarterfinals
(Spain) J F Altur	1	6	6
8	(France) A Boetsch	6	3	4
3	(Germany) M Stich	6	7^{7}
6	(Czech Republic) K Nováček	4	6^{4}

Semifinals
(Spain) J F Altur	1	4
3	(Germany) M Stich	6	6

=== Bottom half ===
First round
5	(Austria) T Muster	6	6
(Germany) C-U Steeb	4	2
(Argentina) G Pérez Roldán	3	3
(Sweden) N Kulti	6	6
(Spain) J Sánchez	3	1
WC	(Germany) M Naewie	6	6
(France) C Pioline	6^{1}	7^{7}	6
4	(Ukraine) A Medvedev	7^{7}	6^{5}	4
7	(Sweden) H Holm	2	1
Q	(France) G Solvès	6	6
(Germany) M-K Goellner	7	6
WC	(Sweden) S Eriksson	5	1
(Sweden) M Gustafsson	6	6
(Germany) D Prinosil	1	2
Q	(Czech Republic) T Anzari	2	3
2	(United States) I Lendl	6	6

Second round
5	(Austria) T Muster	6^{5}	6	4
(Sweden) N Kulti	7^{7}	4	6
WC	(Germany) M Naewie	6	4	6^{1}
(France) C Pioline	4	6	7^{7}
Q	(France) G Solvès	7^{7}	3	6
(Germany) M-K Goellner	6^{2}	6	4
(Sweden) M Gustafsson	4	4
2	(United States) I Lendl	6	6

Quarterfinals
(Sweden) N Kulti	6	1	3
(France) C Pioline	4	6	6
Q	(France) G Solvès	4	6	1
2	(United States) I Lendl	6	3	6

Semifinals
(France) C Pioline	6	6^{1}	1^{r}
2	(United States) I Lendl	1	7^{7}	0
