= 1993 BMW Open =

- Date: 26 April – 3 May
- Edition: 77th
- Category: World Series
- Draw: 32S / 16D
- Prize money: $275,000
- Surface: Clay / outdoor
- Location: Munich, Germany
- Venue: MTTC Iphitos

Champions

Singles
- (United States) Ivan Lendl

Doubles
- (Czech Republic) Martin Damm / (Sweden) Henrik Holm
| ← 1992 · | BMW Open | · 1994 → |

The 1993 BMW Open was an Association of Tennis Professionals men's tennis tournament held at the MTTC Iphitos in Munich, Germany. The tournament was held from 26 April through 3 May 1993. Second-seeded Ivan Lendl won the singles title.

== Finals ==
=== Singles ===
(United States) Ivan Lendl defeated (Germany) Michael Stich 7–6^{(7–2)}, 6–3

- It was Lendl's 1st singles title of the year and the 93rd of his career.

=== Doubles ===
(Czech Republic) Martin Damm / (Sweden) Henrik Holm defeated (Czech Republic) Karel Nováček / (Germany) Carl-Uwe Steeb 6–0, 3–6, 7–5

- It was Damm's 1st title of the year and the 1st of his career. It was Holm's 1st title of the year and the 1st of his career.
