= 1992 BMW Open – Doubles =

Doubles
- 1992 BMW Open

Final
- Champions: (South Africa) David Adams (Netherlands) Menno Oosting
- Runners-up: (Czechoslovakia) Tomáš Anzari (Australia) Carl Limberger
- Score: 3–6, 7–5, 6–3

Events
| Singles | Doubles |
| ← 1991 · | BMW Open | · 1993 → |

Patrick Galbraith and Todd Witsken were the defending champions, but did not participate this year.

David Adams and Henrik Holm won the title, defeating Tomáš Anzari and Carl Limberger 3–6, 7–5, 6–3 in the final.

== Seeds ==
1. (Czechoslovakia) Petr Korda / (Czechoslovakia) Karel Nováček (first round)
2. (South Africa) Pieter Aldrich / (Netherlands) Richard Krajicek (semifinals)
3. (Italy) Omar Camporese / (Croatia) Goran Prpić (semifinals)
4. (South Africa) David Adams / (Netherlands) Menno Oosting (champions)

== Draw ==
=== Key ===
- Q = Qualifier
- WC = Wild card
- LL = Lucky loser
- Alt = Alternate
- ITF = ITF entry
- PR = Protected ranking
- SR = Special ranking
- SE = Special exempt
- JE = Junior exempt
- JR = Junior Accelerator Programme entrant
- CO = College Accelerator Programme entrant
- NG = Next Gen Accelerator Program entrant
- w/o = Walkover
- r = Retired
- d = Defaulted

=== Draw ===
First round
1 | (Czechoslovakia) P Korda (Czechoslovakia) K Nováček | 4 | 7 | 4
(Sweden) T Nydahl (Sweden) T Svantesson | 6 | 6 | 6
Q | (Germany) L Koslowski (Germany) M Naewie | 2 | 6
(Australia) C Limberger (Czechoslovakia) T Anzari | 6 | 7
3 | (Italy) O Camporese (Croatia) G Prpić | 6 | 3 | 6
(New Zealand) S Guy (United States) M Jensen | 4 | 6 | 0
(Sweden) M Larsson (Germany) C-U Steeb | 6 | 6
WC | (Sweden) B Borg (Sweden) N Kroon | 4 | 4
(Latvia) Ģ Dzelde (Czechoslovakia) B Stankovič | 4 | 6
(Germany) M-K Goellner (Germany) D Prinosil | 6 | 7
(Germany) U Riglewski (Sweden) J Svensson | 6 | 6 | 3
4 | (South Africa) D Adams (Netherlands) M Oosting | 7 | 3 | 6
WC | (Austria) T Muster (Germany) M Stich | 6 | 6
(United States) M Bauer (Sweden) J Gunnarsson | 2 | 4
(Czechoslovakia) J Čihák (Czechoslovakia) R Vogel | 5 | 6
2 | (South Africa) P Aldrich (Netherlands) R Krajicek | 7 | 7

Quarterfinals
(Sweden) T Nydahl (Sweden) T Svantesson | 2 | 6 | 2
(Australia) C Limberger (Czechoslovakia) T Anzari | 6 | 2 | 6
3 | (Italy) O Camporese (Croatia) G Prpić | 7 | 6 | 6
(Sweden) M Larsson (Germany) C-U Steeb | 6 | 7 | 3
(Germany) M-K Goellner (Germany) D Prinosil | 6 | 6
4 | (South Africa) D Adams (Netherlands) M Oosting | 7 | 7
WC | (Austria) T Muster (Germany) M Stich | 3 | 6 | 4
2 | (South Africa) P Aldrich (Netherlands) R Krajicek | 6 | 2 | 6

Semifinals
(Australia) C Limberger (Czechoslovakia) T Anzari | 6 | 7
3 | (Italy) O Camporese (Croatia) G Prpić | 4 | 5
4 | (South Africa) D Adams (Netherlands) M Oosting | 6 | 6
2 | (South Africa) P Aldrich (Netherlands) R Krajicek | 3 | 3

Final
(Australia) C Limberger (Czechoslovakia) T Anzari | 6 | 5 | 3
4 | (South Africa) D Adams (Netherlands) M Oosting | 3 | 7 | 6
