= 1990 European Indoor Championships – Singles =

Singles
- 1990 European Indoor Championships

Final
- Champion: (Haiti) Ronald Agénor
- Runner-up: (Soviet Union) Alexander Volkov
- Score: 4–6, 6–4, 7–6^{(10–8)}

Details
- Draw: 32
- Seeds: 8

Events
Singles	Doubles
European Indoor Championships	· 1991 →

Ronald Agénor defeated Alexander Volkov 4–6, 6–4, 7–6^{(10–8)} in the final to secure the title.

== Seeds ==
1. (Socialist Federal Republic of Yugoslavia) Goran Ivanišević (second round)
2. (Sweden) Jonas Svensson (quarterfinals)
3. (Sweden) Magnus Gustafsson (first round)
4. (Austria) Horst Skoff (second round)
5. (Czechoslovakia) Petr Korda (second round)
6. (Haiti) Ronald Agénor (champion)
7. (Argentina) Franco Davín (first round)
8. (Soviet Union) Alexander Volkov (final)

== Draws ==
=== Key ===
- Q - Qualifier
- WC - Wild card
- LL - Lucky loser

=== Finals ===
Semifinals				Finals
Q	(Germany) Martin Sinner	1	6^{1}
6	(Haiti) Ronald Agénor	6	7^{7}	6	(Haiti) Ronald Agénor	4	6	7^{10}
	(Brazil) Luiz Mattar	3	2	8	(Soviet Union) Alexander Volkov	6	4	6^{8}
8	(Soviet Union) Alexander Volkov	6	6

=== Section 1 ===
First round
1	(Socialist Federal Republic of Yugoslavia) G Ivanišević	7	7
LL	(Mexico) L Lavalle	6	5
Q	(Germany) M Sinner	6	6
Q	(United States) L Jensen	2	2
(South Africa) G Muller	7	5	1
(Czechoslovakia) M Šrejber	6	7	6
Q	(South Africa) D Visser	6	6
7	(Argentina) F Davín	4	4
3	(Sweden) M Gustafsson	4	6	2
(United States) K Curren	6	4	6
LL	(South Africa) P Aldrich	6	6
WC	(United States) P Annacone	2	2
(United States) M Washington	5	3
(Germany) J Wöhrmann	7	6
(France) T Champion	1	2
6	(Haiti) R Agénor	6	6

Second round
1	(Socialist Federal Republic of Yugoslavia) G Ivanišević	6	4
Q	(Germany) M Sinner	7	6
(Czechoslovakia) M Šrejber	6	6
Q	(South Africa) D Visser	4	4
(United States) K Curren	6	6
LL	(South Africa) P Aldrich	4	2
(Germany) J Wöhrmann	2	3
6	(Haiti) R Agénor	6	6

Quarterfinals
Q	(Germany) M Sinner	6	5	6
(Czechoslovakia) M Šrejber	4	7	2
(United States) K Curren	6^{7}	4
6	(Haiti) R Agénor	7^{9}	6

Semifinals
Q	(Germany) M Sinner	1	6^{1}
6	(Haiti) R Agénor	6	7^{7}

=== Section 2 ===
First round
5	(Czechoslovakia) P Korda	1	6	7
(Germany) M Stich	6	4	6
(France) J Fleurian	6	6
(Finland) V Paloheimo	2	2
(Brazil) L Mattar	6	6
WC	(Czechoslovakia) J Kodeš Jr.	3	1
(Uruguay) D Perez	2	0
4	(Austria) H Skoff	6	6
8	(Soviet Union) A Volkov	6	6
(United States) J Arias	3	4
(Germany) U Riglewski	6	7	6
(Sweden) C Bergström	7	6	4
WC	(Germany) M Zoecke	6	6	6
(Sweden) J Gunnarsson	4	7	1
Q	(Soviet Union) A Olhovskiy	0	6	2
2	(Sweden) J Svensson	6	3	6

Second round
5	(Czechoslovakia) P Korda	4	1
(France) J Fleurian	6	6
(Brazil) L Mattar	6	4	6
4	(Austria) H Skoff	1	6	3
8	(Soviet Union) A Volkov	6	6
(Germany) U Riglewski	3	3
WC	(Germany) M Zoecke	2	7	2
2	(Sweden) J Svensson	6	5	6

Quarterfinals
(France) J Fleurian	6^{2}	4
(Brazil) L Mattar	7^{7}	6
8	(Soviet Union) A Volkov	6	6
2	(Sweden) J Svensson	3	0

Semifinals
(Brazil) L Mattar	3	2
8	(Soviet Union) A Volkov	6	6
