= 1990 European Indoor Championships =

- Date: 8–14 October
- Edition: 1st
- Category: World Series
- Draw: 32S / 16D
- Prize money: $260,000
- Surface: Carpet / indoor
- Location: Berlin, Germany

Champions

Singles
- (Haiti) Ronald Agénor

Doubles
- (South Africa) Pieter Aldrich / (South Africa) Danie Visser
European Indoor Championships	· 1991 →

The 1990 European Indoor Championships was an ATP men's tennis tournament held in Berlin, Germany from 8 October until 14 October 1990. It was the inaugural edition of the tournament and was part of the World Series tier of the 1990 ATP Tour. Sixth-seeded Ronald Agénor won the singles title by defeating eighth-seeded Alexander Volkov in the final.

== Finals ==
=== Singles ===
(Haiti) Ronald Agénor defeated (Soviet Union) Alexander Volkov, 4–6, 6-4, 7–6^{(10–8)}

- It was Agénor's 2nd singles title of the year and the 3rd and last of his career.

=== Doubles ===
(South Africa) Pieter Aldrich / (South Africa) Danie Visser defeated (United States) Kevin Curren / (United States) Patrick Galbraith, 7–6, 7–6
