= 1991 Holsten International – Doubles =

Doubles
- 1991 Holsten International

Final
- Champions: (Czechoslovakia) Petr Korda (Czechoslovakia) Karel Nováček
- Runners-up: (Netherlands) Jan Siemerink (Czechoslovakia) Daniel Vacek
- Score: 3–6, 7–5, 7–5

Details
- Draw: 16
- Seeds: 4

Events
Singles	Doubles
← 1990 ·	European Indoor Championships

Pieter Aldrich and Danie Visser were the defending champions, but Aldrich did not compete this year. Visser teamed up with Neil Broad and lost in semifinals to Jan Siemerink and Daniel Vacek.

Petr Korda and Karel Nováček won the title by defeating Jan Siemerink and Daniel Vacek 3–6, 7–5, 7–5 in the final.

== Seeds ==
1. (Germany) Udo Riglewski / (Germany) Michael Stich (semifinals)
2. (United Kingdom) Neil Broad / (South Africa) Danie Visser (semifinals)
3. (United States) Steve DeVries / (Australia) David Macpherson (first round)
4. (Sweden) Ronnie Båthman / (Sweden) Rikard Bergh (first round)

== Draw ==
Key

- Q = Qualifier
- WC = Wild card
- LL = Lucky loser
- Alt = Alternate
- ITF = ITF entry
- PR = Protected ranking
- SR = Special ranking
- SE = Special exempt
- JE = Junior exempt
- JR = Junior Accelerator Programme entrant
- CO = College Accelerator Programme entrant
- NG = Next Gen Accelerator Program entrant
- w/o = Walkover
- r = Retired
- d = Defaulted

=== Draw ===
First round
1	(Germany) U Riglewski (Germany) M Stich	4	7	6
(United States) J Brown (United States) S Melville	6	5	3
(Czechoslovakia) V Flégl (South Africa) S Kruger	6	7	7
Q	(United States) J Kriek (Sweden) J Svensson	7	6	6
4	(Sweden) R Båthman (Sweden) R Bergh	2	3
(United States) K Curren (United States) K Jones	6	6
(Mexico) J Lozano (Argentina) G Luza	7	3	4
(Czechoslovakia) P Korda (Czechoslovakia) K Nováček	5	6	6
(Netherlands) T Nijssen (Czechoslovakia) C Suk	5	6	2
(Germany) E Jelen (Germany) CU Steeb	7	0	6
(Netherlands) J Siemerink (Czechoslovakia) D Vacek	6	7
3	(United States) S DeVries (Australia) D Macpherson	3	5
(United States) C Beckman (United States) S Salumaa	6	1	4
(Netherlands) HJ Davids (Czechoslovakia) L Pimek	3	6	6
(Brazil) N Aerts (Brazil) R Acioly	1	6	4
2	(United Kingdom) N Broad (South Africa) D Visser	6	4	6

Quarterfinals
1	(Germany) U Riglewski (Germany) M Stich	3	6	6
(Czechoslovakia) V Flégl (South Africa) S Kruger	6	1	4
(United States) K Curren (United States) K Jones	4	6	4
(Czechoslovakia) P Korda (Czechoslovakia) K Nováček	6	4	6
(Germany) E Jelen (Germany) CU Steeb	6	1	6
(Netherlands) J Siemerink (Czechoslovakia) D Vacek	4	6	7
(Netherlands) HJ Davids (Czechoslovakia) L Pimek	4	6
2	(United Kingdom) N Broad (South Africa) D Visser	6	7

Semifinals
1	(Germany) U Riglewski (Germany) M Stich	6	7	4
(Czechoslovakia) P Korda (Czechoslovakia) K Nováček	7	6	6
(Netherlands) J Siemerink (Czechoslovakia) D Vacek	6	7
2	(United Kingdom) N Broad (South Africa) D Visser	3	6

Final
(Czechoslovakia) P Korda (Czechoslovakia) K Nováček	3	7	7
(Netherlands) J Siemerink (Czechoslovakia) D Vacek	6	5	5
