= 1991 Holsten International – Singles =

Singles
- 1991 Holsten International

Final
- Champion: (Czechoslovakia) Petr Korda
- Runner-up: (France) Arnaud Boetsch
- Score: 6–3, 6–4

Details
- Draw: 32
- Seeds: 8

Events
Singles	Doubles
← 1990 ·	European Indoor Championships

Petr Korda defeated Arnaud Boetsch 6–3, 6–4 in the final to secure the title.

== Seeds ==
The text in italics indicates the round in which that seed was eliminated.

1. (Germany) Michael Stich (quarterfinals)
2. (Czechoslovakia) Karel Nováček (first round)
3. (Spain) Sergi Bruguera (second round)
4. (Czechoslovakia) Petr Korda (champion)
5. (Soviet Union) Alexander Volkov (quarterfinals)
6. (Sweden) Jonas Svensson (second round)
7. (Sweden) Anders Järryd (semifinals)
8. (Italy) Cristiano Caratti (first round)

== Draws ==
=== Key ===
- Q - Qualifier
- WC - Wild card

=== Finals ===
Semifinals					Finals
7	(Sweden) Anders Järryd	3	6	2
4	(Czechoslovakia) Petr Korda	6	1	6	4	(Czechoslovakia) Petr Korda	6	6
Q	(France) Arnaud Boetsch	6	6		Q	(France) Arnaud Boetsch	3	4
	(Germany) Patrik Kühnen	3	2

=== Section 1 ===
First round
1	(Germany) M Stich	6	3	7
(Germany) C Steeb	2	6	5
(Netherlands) J Siemerink	7	7^{10}
(Belgium) E Jelen	6	6^{8}
WC	(Belgium) J Van Herck	3	6	3
WC	(France) F Santoro	6	3	6
(United States) J Kriek	3	2
7	(Sweden) A Järryd	6	6
4	(Czechoslovakia) P Korda	6	1	6
(Haiti) R Agénor	3	6	3
Q	(South Africa) D Visser	6^{3}	7^{11}	4
Q	(Germany) U Riglewski	7^{7}	6^{9}	6
(France) R Gilbert	5	1
(France) G Raoux	7	6
(Germany) C Saceanu	7^{7}	3	6^{2}
5	(Soviet Union) A Volkov	6^{4}	6	7^{7}

Second round
1	(Germany) M Stich	6	6
(Netherlands) J Siemerink	2	3
WC	(France) F Santoro	3	7^{7}	3
7	(Sweden) A Järryd	6	6^{5}	6
4	(Czechoslovakia) P Korda	7^{7}	6
Q	(Germany) U Riglewski	6^{4}	3
(France) G Raoux	6	4	2
5	(Soviet Union) A Volkov	4	6	6

Quarterfinals
1	(Germany) M Stich	4	6^{5}
7	(Sweden) A Järryd	6	7^{7}
4	(Czechoslovakia) P Korda	6	5	6
5	(Soviet Union) A Volkov	3	7	1

Semifinals
7	(Sweden) A Järryd	3	6	2
4	(Czechoslovakia) P Korda	6	1	6

=== Section 2 ===
First round
6	(Sweden) J Svensson	6	6
(Germany) P Baur	3	4
Q	(France) A Boetsch	6	6
(Sweden) C Bergström	4	2
(France) J Fleurian	3	7^{7}	6
Q	(United States) K Jones	6	6^{5}	4
WC	(Germany) M Zoecke	3	6	3
3	(Spain) S Bruguera	6	1	6
8	(Italy) C Caratti	3	3
(United States) T Mayotte	6	6
(Germany) P Kühnen	6	6
(Germany) A Mronz	3	4
(France) C Pioline	6	4	6
(France) T Champion	4	6	3
(United States) K Curren	7^{7}	6
2	(Czechoslovakia) K Nováček	6^{3}	3

Second round
6	(Sweden) J Svensson	2	1
Q	(France) A Boetsch	6	6
(France) J Fleurian	6	6
3	(Spain) S Bruguera	4	3
(United States) T Mayotte	6	5	4
(Germany) P Kühnen	3	7	6
(France) C Pioline	6	6
(United States) K Curren	3	2

Quarterfinals
Q	(France) A Boetsch	6	6
(France) J Fleurian	0	3
(Germany) P Kühnen	7^{7}	6
(France) C Pioline	6^{5}	3

Semifinals
Q	(France) A Boetsch	6	6
(Germany) P Kühnen	3	2
