= 1993 Canadian Open – Men's doubles =

Men's doubles
- 1993 Canadian Open

Final
- Champions: (United States) Jim Courier (The Bahamas) Mark Knowles
- Runners-up: (Canada) Glenn Michibata (United States) David Pate
- Score: 6–4, 7–6

Details
- Draw: 28
- Seeds: 8

Events
Singles	men	women
Doubles	men	women
- Canadian Open

Patrick Galbraith and Danie Visser were the defending champions, but competed this year with different partners. Galbraith teamed up with Grant Connell and lost in the semifinals to Jim Courier and Mark Knowles, while Visser teamed up with Laurie Warder and lost in the second round, also to Courier and Knowles.

Jim Courier and Mark Knowles won the title by defeating Glenn Michibata and David Pate 6–4, 7–6 in the final.

== Seeds ==
The first four seeds received a bye into the second round.

1. (United States) Patrick McEnroe / (United States) Richey Reneberg (semifinals)
2. (Canada) Grant Connell / (United States) Patrick Galbraith (semifinals)
3. (South Africa) Danie Visser / (Australia) Laurie Warder (second round)
4. (Zimbabwe) Byron Black / (United States) Rick Leach (second round)
5. (United States) Shelby Cannon / (United States) Scott Melville (second round)
6. (Canada) Glenn Michibata / (United States) David Pate (final)
7. (South Africa) Stefan Kruger / (United States) Mark Keil (first round)
8. (Australia) Mark Kratzmann / (Australia) Jason Stoltenberg (quarterfinals)

== Draw ==
Key

- Q = Qualifier
- WC = Wild card
- LL = Lucky loser
- Alt = Alternate
- ITF = ITF entry
- PR = Protected ranking
- SR = Special ranking
- SE = Special exempt
- JE = Junior exempt
- JR = Junior Accelerator Programme entrant
- CO = College Accelerator Programme entrant
- NG = Next Gen Accelerator Program entrant
- w/o = Walkover
- r = Retired
- d = Defaulted

=== Finals ===
Semifinals
1	(United States) Patrick McEnroe (United States) Richey Reneberg	3	2
6	(Canada) Glenn Michibata (United States) David Pate	6	6
WC	(United States) Jim Courier (The Bahamas) Mark Knowles	4	7	7
2	(Canada) Grant Connell (United States) Patrick Galbraith	6	6	6

Final
6	(Canada) Glenn Michibata (United States) David Pate	4	6
WC	(United States) Jim Courier (The Bahamas) Mark Knowles	6	7

=== Top half ===
First round
(South Africa) R Deppe (Norway) BO Pedersen	4	3
(United States) J Pugh (United States) D Wheaton	6	6
(United States) S Davis (United States) K Jones	4	4
(Austria) A Antonitsch (Germany) B Becker	6	6
(United States) D Eisenman (Australia) A Kratzmann	3	6	3
8	(Australia) M Kratzmann (Australia) J Stoltenberg	6	1	6
(United States) A O'Brien (United States) J Palmer	4	6	6
WC	(Canada) S Leblanc (Canada) G Rusedski	6	3	4
WC	(Canada) A Chang (Canada) B Gyetko	4	7	2
(Czech Republic) M Damm (Sweden) H Holm	6	5	6
(United States) M Briggs (United States) B Garnett	5	6
6	(Canada) G Michibata (United States) D Pate	7	7

Second round
1	(United States) P McEnroe (United States) R Reneberg	4	6	6
(United States) J Pugh (United States) D Wheaton	6	3	2
(Austria) A Antonitsch (Germany) B Becker	7	5	2
8	(Australia) M Kratzmann (Australia) J Stoltenberg	5	7	6
4	(Zimbabwe) B Black (United States) R Leach	6	1
(United States) A O'Brien (United States) J Palmer	7	6
(Czech Republic) M Damm (Sweden) H Holm	4	6	3
6	(Canada) G Michibata (United States) D Pate	6	4	6

Quarterfinals
1	(United States) P McEnroe (United States) R Reneberg	6	6
8	(Australia) M Kratzmann (Australia) J Stoltenberg	3	3
(United States) A O'Brien (United States) J Palmer	4	4
6	(Canada) G Michibata (United States) D Pate	6	6

Semifinals
1	(United States) P McEnroe (United States) R Reneberg	3	2
6	(Canada) G Michibata (United States) D Pate	6	6

=== Bottom half ===
First round
5	(United States) S Cannon (United States) S Melville	6	3	6
Q	(Australia) J Morgan (New Zealand) B Steven	4	6	3
(South Africa) B Talbot (United States) G Van Emburgh	4	3
(United States) B Pearce (United States) D Randall	6	6
(Switzerland) J Hlasek (United States) T Martin	6	1	0
WC	(United States) J Courier (The Bahamas) M Knowles	3	6	6
7	(South Africa) S Kruger (United States) M Keil	3	2
(United Kingdom) J Bates (United Kingdom) C Wilkinson	6	6
(South Africa) JL de Jager (South Africa) W Ferreira	6	5	2
WC	(Canada) S Lareau (Canada) D Nestor	4	7	6
(United States) B Shelton (United States) T Witsken	6	6
Q	(Italy) N Bruno (Italy) G Pozzi	3	4

Second round
5	(United States) S Cannon (United States) S Melville	1	4
(United States) B Pearce (United States) D Randall	6	6
WC	(United States) J Courier (The Bahamas) M Knowles	6	6
3	(South Africa) D Visser (Australia) L Warder	2	2
(United Kingdom) J Bates (United Kingdom) C Wilkinson	3	6
WC	(Canada) S Lareau (Canada) D Nestor	6	7
(United States) B Shelton (United States) T Witsken	7	3	6
2	(Canada) G Connell (United States) P Galbraith	6	6	7

Quarterfinals
(United States) B Pearce (United States) D Randall	1	6	6
WC	(United States) J Courier (The Bahamas) M Knowles	6	1	7
WC	(Canada) S Lareau (Canada) D Nestor	4	6
2	(Canada) G Connell (United States) P Galbraith	6	7

Semifinals
WC	(United States) J Courier (The Bahamas) M Knowles	4	7	7
2	(Canada) G Connell (United States) P Galbraith	6	6	6
