= 1993 Canadian Open (tennis) =

- Date: July 26 – August 1 (men); August 16–22 (women)
- Edition: 104th
- Surface: Hard / outdoor

Champions

Men's singles
- (Sweden) Mikael Pernfors

Women's singles
- (Germany) Steffi Graf

Men's doubles
- (United States) Jim Courier / (The Bahamas) Mark Knowles

Women's doubles
- (Latvia) Larisa Neiland / (Czech Republic) Jana Novotná
- Canadian Open

The 1993 Canadian Open was a tennis tournament played on outdoor hard courts. It was the 104th edition of the Canada Masters, and was part of the ATP Super 9 of the 1993 ATP Tour, and of the Tier I Series of the 1993 WTA Tour. The men's event took place at the Uniprix Stadium in Montreal, Quebec, Canada, from July 26 through August 1, 1993, and the women's event at the National Tennis Centre in Toronto, Ontario, Canada, from August 16 through August 22, 1993.

== Finals ==
=== Men's singles ===
(Sweden) Mikael Pernfors defeated (United States) Todd Martin, 2–6, 6–2, 7–5

- It was Mikael Pernfor's 1st title of the year and his 3rd overall. It was his only Masters title.

=== Women's singles ===
(Germany) Steffi Graf defeated (United States) Jennifer Capriati, 6–1, 0–6, 6–3

- It was Steffi Graf's 7th title of the year and her 76th overall. It was her 3rd Tier I title of the year and her 8th overall. It was her 2nd title at the event, also winning in 1990.

=== Men's doubles ===
(United States) Jim Courier / (The Bahamas) Mark Knowles defeated (Canada) Glenn Michibata / (United States) David Pate, 6–4, 7–6

=== Women's doubles ===
(Latvia) Larisa Neiland / (Czech Republic) Jana Novotná defeated (Spain) Arantxa Sanchez-Vicario / (Czech Republic) Helena Suková 6–1, 6–2
