= 1993 Canadian Open – Women's singles =

Women's singles
- 1993 Canadian Open

Final
- Champion: (Germany) Steffi Graf
- Runner-up: (United States) Jennifer Capriati
- Score: 6–1, 0–6, 6–3

Details
- Draw: 56 (3WC/8Q/4LL)
- Seeds: 16

Events
Singles	men	women
Doubles	men	women
- Canadian Open

Steffi Graf defeated Jennifer Capriati in the final, 6–1, 0–6, 6–3 to win the women's singles tennis title at the 1993 Canadian Open.

Arantxa Sánchez Vicario was the defending champion, but lost in the semifinals to Capriati.

== Seeds ==
The first eight seeds received a bye into the second round.

1. (Germany) Steffi Graf (champion)
2. (Spain) Arantxa Sánchez Vicario (semifinals)
3. (Argentina) Gabriela Sabatini (third round)
4. (United States) Mary Joe Fernández (quarterfinals)
5. (Czech Republic) Jana Novotná (third round)
6. (United States) Jennifer Capriati (final)
7. (Germany) Anke Huber (quarterfinals)
8. (Switzerland) Manuela Maleeva Fragnière (semifinals)
9. (Czech Republic) Helena Suková (third round)
10. (France) ~~Mary Pierce~~ (withdrew)
11. (South Africa) Amanda Coetzer (third round)
12. (France) Nathalie Tauziat (quarterfinals)
13. (Germany) ~~Sabine Hack~~ (withdrew)
14. (Bulgaria) Katerina Maleeva (third round)
15. (Japan) Naoko Sawamatsu (third round)
16. (United States) Lori McNeil (third round)

== Draw ==
Key

- Q = Qualifier
- WC = Wild card
- LL = Lucky loser
- Alt = Alternate
- ITF = ITF entry
- PR = Protected ranking
- SR = Special ranking
- SE = Special exempt
- JE = Junior exempt
- JR = Junior Accelerator Programme entrant
- CO = College Accelerator Programme entrant
- NG = Next Gen Accelerator Program entrant
- w/o = Walkover
- r = Retired
- d = Defaulted

=== Finals ===
Quarterfinals
1	(Germany) Steffi Graf	6	7
12	(France) Nathalie Tauziat	2	5
4	(United States) Mary Joe Fernández	4	4
8	(Switzerland) Manuela Maleeva-Fragnière	6	6
6	(United States) Jennifer Capriati
(France) Julie Halard	d
7	(Germany) Anke Huber	7	2	1
2	(Spain) Arantxa Sánchez Vicario	5	6	6

Semifinals
1	(Germany) Steffi Graf	6	6
8	(Switzerland) Manuela Maleeva-Fragnière	2	1
6	(United States) Jennifer Capriati	7^{10}	6
2	(Spain) Arantxa Sánchez Vicario	6^{8}	2

Final
1	(Germany) Steffi Graf	6	0	6
6	(United States) Jennifer Capriati	1	6	3

=== Top half ===
==== Section 1 ====
First round
(United States) P Fendick	6	4	4
(South Africa) R Nideffer	1	6	6
LL	(Ukraine) E Brioukhovets	2	7^{7}	3
(Canada) P Hy	6	6^{4}	6
(Latvia) L Neiland	1	6	0
15	(Japan) N Sawamatsu	6	2	6
12	(France) N Tauziat	6	6
Q	(France) C Suire	2	0
WC	(United States) T Austin	7	6
Q	(United States) A Keller	5	2
(United States) M Werdel	6	6
Q	(France) S Testud	3	2

Second round
1	(Germany) S Graf	7	6
(South Africa) R Nideffer	5	3
(Canada) P Hy	5	0
15	(Japan) N Sawamatsu	7	6
12	(France) N Tauziat	6	6
WC	(United States) T Austin	4	1
(United States) M Werdel	1	2
5	(Czech Republic) J Novotná	6	6

Third round
1	(Germany) S Graf	6	6
15	(Japan) N Sawamatsu	1	2
12	(France) N Tauziat	2	6	6
5	(Czech Republic) J Novotná	6	4	3

Quarterfinals
1	(Germany) S Graf	6	7
12	(France) N Tauziat	2	5

==== Section 2 ====
First round
Q	(Argentina) MJ Gaidano	1	3
(Croatia) I Majoli	6	6
(Georgia (country)) L Meskhi	6	6
WC	(Canada) R Simpson-Alter	3	4
(Australia) R McQuillan	2	6	1
(Belarus) N Zvereva	6	2	6
14	(Bulgaria) K Maleeva	6	7
(Italy) N Baudone	3	5
Q	(Ukraine) N Medvedeva	5	6	6
(Indonesia) Y Basuki	7	2	3
(Romania) R Dragomir	7^{7}	6
Q	(Russia) E Makarova	6^{5}	2

Second round
4	(United States) MJ Fernández	6	6
(Croatia) I Majoli	3	4
(Georgia (country)) L Meskhi	6	7^{7}
(Belarus) N Zvereva	4	6^{2}
14	(Bulgaria) K Maleeva	6	6
Q	(Ukraine) N Medvedeva	1	4
(Romania) R Dragomir	5	4
8	(Switzerland) M Maleeva-Fragnière	7	6

Third round
4	(United States) MJ Fernández	6	6
(Georgia (country)) L Meskhi	3	3
14	(Bulgaria) K Maleeva	4	6	2
8	(Switzerland) M Maleeva-Fragnière	6	3	6

Quarterfinals
4	(United States) MJ Fernández	4	4
8	(Switzerland) M Maleeva-Fragnière	6	6

=== Bottom half ===
==== Section 3 ====
First round
(United States) C Rubin	6	4	6
(Germany) M Babel	4	6	4
(France) P Paradis-Mangon	4	2
(Canada) H Kelesi	6	6
(South Africa) E Reinach	4	6	1
11	(South Africa) A Coetzer	6	3	6
(Netherlands) M Oremans	6	6
(United States) M McGrath	4	1
LL	(United States) K Adams	1	1
(France) J Halard	6	6
(United States) L Raymond	6	6
LL	(Australia) L Field	0	3

Second round
6	(United States) J Capriati	6	6
(United States) C Rubin	2	1
(Canada) H Kelesi	2	3
11	(South Africa) A Coetzer	6	6
(Netherlands) M Oremans	6^{5}	6^{3}
(France) J Halard	7^{7}	7^{7}
(United States) L Raymond	6^{4}	2
3	(Argentina) G Sabatini	7^{7}	6

Third round
6	(United States) J Capriati	6	6
11	(South Africa) A Coetzer	0	2
(France) J Halard	6	4	7^{7}
3	(Argentina) G Sabatini	4	6	6^{3}

Quarterfinals
6	(United States) J Capriati
(France) J Halard	d

==== Section 4 ====
First round
(Netherlands) B Schultz	7	7^{7}
(Germany) B Rittner	5	6^{4}
WC	(Canada) M Drake	3	2
(United States) G Helgeson	6	6
Q	(Kazakhstan) E Likhovtseva	1	5
16	(United States) L McNeil	6	7
9	(Czech Republic) H Suková	6	6
(France) N van Lottum	3	3
(United States) A Grossman	6	6
LL	(South Africa) T Price	2	3
Q	(Australia) J Byrne	2	3
(Italy) L Golarsa	6	6

Second round
7	(Germany) A Huber	6	6
(Netherlands) B Schultz	3	0
(United States) G Helgeson	3	1
16	(United States) L McNeil	6	6
9	(Czech Republic) H Suková	6	6
(United States) A Grossman	2	1
(Italy) L Golarsa	5	2
2	(Spain) A Sánchez Vicario	7	6

Third round
7	(Germany) A Huber	4	6	7^{7}
16	(United States) L McNeil	6	3	6^{2}
9	(Czech Republic) H Suková	1	1
2	(Spain) A Sánchez Vicario	6	6

Quarterfinals
7	(Germany) A Huber	7	2	1
2	(Spain) A Sánchez Vicario	5	6	6
