= 1990 European Indoor Championships – Doubles =

Doubles
- 1990 European Indoor Championships

Final
- Champions: (South Africa) Pieter Aldrich (South Africa) Danie Visser
- Runners-up: (United States) Kevin Curren (United States) Patrick Galbraith
- Score: 7–6, 7–6

Details
- Draw: 16
- Seeds: 4

Events
Singles	Doubles
- European Indoor Championships

The 1990 European Indoor Championships – Doubles was an event of the 1990 European Indoor Championships men's tennis tournament which was part of World Series tier of the 1990 ATP Tour and held from 8 October until 14 October 1990 in Berlin, Germany. The draw consisted of 16 teams of which four were seeded.

The first-seeded pairing Pieter Aldrich and Danie Visser won the doubles title by defeating the second-seeded team of Kevin Curren and Patrick Galbraith 7–6, 7–6 in the final.

== Seeds ==
1. (South Africa) Pieter Aldrich / (South Africa) Danie Visser (champions)
2. (United States) Kevin Curren / (United States) Patrick Galbraith (final)
3. (United Kingdom) Neil Broad / (South Africa) Gary Muller (quarterfinals)
4. (Germany) Udo Riglewski / (Germany) Michael Stich (first round)

== Draw ==
Key

- Q = Qualifier
- WC = Wild card
- LL = Lucky loser
- Alt = Alternate
- ITF = ITF entry
- PR = Protected ranking
- SR = Special ranking
- SE = Special exempt
- JE = Junior exempt
- JR = Junior Accelerator Programme entrant
- CO = College Accelerator Programme entrant
- NG = Next Gen Accelerator Program entrant
- w/o = Walkover
- r = Retired
- d = Defaulted

First Round
1	(South Africa) Pieter Aldrich (South Africa) Danie Visser	6	6
(Denmark) Michael Mortensen (Netherlands) Michiel Schapers	4	2
(United States) Steve DeVries (Australia) David Macpherson	4	7	6
(United States) Jeff Brown (South Africa) Stefan Kruger	6	6	0
3	(United Kingdom) Neil Broad (South Africa) Gary Muller	6	6
(Argentina) Gustavo Luza (Brazil) Luiz Mattar	3	4
(Germany) Dirk Dier (Romania) Dinu Pescariu	3	3
(United States) Patrick McEnroe (United States) Scott Melville	6	6
(Czechoslovakia) Tomáš Šmíd (Czechoslovakia) Cyril Suk	5	7	1
(United Kingdom) Andrew Castle (Sweden) Per Henricsson	7	6	6
(Socialist Federal Republic of Yugoslavia) Goran Ivanišević (Czechoslovakia) Petr Korda	7	6
4	(Germany) Udo Riglewski (Germany) Michael Stich	5	4
(United States) Charles Beckman (United States) Luke Jensen	6	3
(Mexico) Leonardo Lavalle (Italy) Diego Nargiso	7	6
(Czechoslovakia) Vojtěch Flégl (Czechoslovakia) Daniel Vacek	6	1
2	(United States) Kevin Curren (United States) Patrick Galbraith	7	6

Quarterfinals
1	(South Africa) Pieter Aldrich (South Africa) Danie Visser	6	6
(United States) Steve DeVries (Australia) David Macpherson	2	4
3	(United Kingdom) Neil Broad (South Africa) Gary Muller	4	4
(United States) Patrick McEnroe (United States) Scott Melville	6	6
(United Kingdom) Andrew Castle (Sweden) Per Henricsson	3	2
(Socialist Federal Republic of Yugoslavia) Goran Ivanišević (Czechoslovakia) Petr Korda	6	6
(Mexico) Leonardo Lavalle (Italy) Diego Nargiso	6	1
2	(United States) Kevin Curren (United States) Patrick Galbraith	7	6

Semifinals
1	(South Africa) Pieter Aldrich (South Africa) Danie Visser	6	6
(United States) Patrick McEnroe (United States) Scott Melville	3	4
(Socialist Federal Republic of Yugoslavia) Goran Ivanišević (Czechoslovakia) Petr Korda	7	6	6
2	(United States) Kevin Curren (United States) Patrick Galbraith	6	7	7

Final
1	(South Africa) Pieter Aldrich (South Africa) Danie Visser	7	7
2	(United States) Kevin Curren (United States) Patrick Galbraith	6	6
