= 1994 BMW Open – Doubles =

Doubles
- 1994 BMW Open

Final
- Champions: (Russia) Yevgeny Kafelnikov (Czech Republic) David Rikl
- Runners-up: (Germany) Boris Becker (Czech Republic) Petr Korda
- Score: 7–6, 7–5

Events
Singles	Doubles
← 1993 ·	BMW Open	· 1995 →

Martin Damm and Henrik Holm were the defending champions, but did not play together this year. Damm partnered Karel Nováček, losing in the first round. Holm partnered Anders Järryd, losing in the first round.

Yevgeny Kafelnikov and David Rikl won the title, defeating Boris Becker and Petr Korda 7–6, 7–5 in the final.

== Seeds ==
1. (Netherlands) Tom Nijssen / (Czech Republic) Cyril Suk (first round)
2. (Sweden) Henrik Holm / (Sweden) Anders Järryd (first round)
3. (Czech Republic) Martin Damm / (Czech Republic) Karel Nováček (first round)
4. (Spain) Sergio Casal / (Spain) Emilio Sánchez

== Draw ==
=== Key ===
- Q = Qualifier
- WC = Wild card
- LL = Lucky loser
- Alt = Alternate
- SE = Special exempt
- PR = Protected ranking
- ITF = ITF entry
- JE = Junior exempt
- w/o = Walkover
- r = Retired
- d = Defaulted
- SR = Special ranking

=== Draw ===
First round
1	(Netherlands) T Nijssen (Czech Republic) C Suk	4	6	1
(Netherlands) M Koevermans (Australia) D Macpherson	6	3	6
(South Africa) B Haygarth (South Africa) S Kruger	3	5
(Germany) B Becker (Czech Republic) P Korda	6	7
4	(Spain) S Casal (Spain) E Sánchez	6	6
(South Africa) R Deppe (United States) J Waite	3	4
(South Africa) W Ferreira (South Africa) M Ondruska	6	6
Q	(Czech Republic) S Doseděl (Czech Republic) V Flégl	1	2
(Czech Republic) Y Kafelnikov (Czech Republic) D Rikl	6	7
LL	(Germany) T Gollwitzer (Germany) M Geserer	4	6
WC	(Germany) M Sinner (Germany) M Stich	6	1	6
3	(Czech Republic) M Damm (Czech Republic) K Nováček	1	6	2
(Germany) P Kühnen (Germany) D Prinosil	4	4
(Germany) B Karbacher (Germany) U Riglewski	6	6
(United States) M Keil (United States) T Kronemann	7	6
2	(Sweden) H Holm (Sweden) A Järryd	6	4

Quarterfinals
(Netherlands) M Koevermans (Australia) D Macpherson	6	3	4
(Germany) B Becker (Czech Republic) P Korda	4	6	6
4	(Spain) S Casal (Spain) E Sánchez	3	2
(South Africa) W Ferreira (South Africa) M Ondruska	6	6
(Czech Republic) Y Kafelnikov (Czech Republic) D Rikl	6	5	6
WC	(Germany) M Sinner (Germany) M Stich	0	7	2
(Germany) B Karbacher (Germany) U Riglewski	1	6	6
(United States) M Keil (United States) T Kronemann	6	4	3

Semifinals
(Germany) B Becker (Czech Republic) P Korda	6	6
(South Africa) W Ferreira (South Africa) M Ondruska	2	1
(Czech Republic) Y Kafelnikov (Czech Republic) D Rikl	2	6	7
(Germany) B Karbacher (Germany) U Riglewski	6	2	6

Final
(Germany) B Becker (Czech Republic) P Korda	6	5
(Czech Republic) Y Kafelnikov (Czech Republic) D Rikl	7	7
