= José Francisco Altur =

Spanish tennis player (born 1968)

- Country (sports): Spain
- Born: 24 March 1968 (age 57); Valencia, Spain
- Height: 1.90 m (6 ft 3 in)
- Turned pro: 1985
- Plays: Left-handed
- Prize money: $471,853

Singles
- Career record: 31–66
- Career titles: 1
- Highest ranking: No. 88 (9 Apr 1990)

Grand Slam singles results
- Australian Open: 1R (1990, 1991)
- French Open: 1R (1990, 1991)
- Wimbledon: 1R (1990, 1991, 1993, 1994)
- US Open: 1R (1990, 1991, 1993)

Doubles
- Career record: 11–23
- Career titles: 0
- Highest ranking: No. 189 (7 May 1990)

Grand Slam doubles results
- Australian Open: 2R (1990)

José Francisco Altur Gascón (born 24 March 1968) is a tennis coach and a former professional player from Spain.

== Career ==
=== Pro tour ===
Altur won the 1989 San Marino Open, as a qualifier, although he didn't have to face a single top 100 player. It was his only tournament win on the ATP Tour.

He played 11 Grand Slam singles matches during his career, but lost them all. His most noteworthy efforts were taking a set off Jim Courier at the 1990 French Open and winning the opening set against Michael Chang at that year's Wimbledon.

Altur did however make it into the second round of the Men's Doubles at the 1990 Australian Open, his only Grand Slam appearance in that format. Partnering South African David Adams, they defeated the Spanish pairing of Jordi Arrese and Francisco Clavet.

His best performance in 1992 came at the Croatia Open, where he reached the quarterfinals.

In 1993 he made the semifinals of the BMW Open in Munich. Although he lost the first set, Altur was able to defeat world number five and top seed Petr Korda in the second round.

He made the quarterfinals of the U.S. Men's Clay Court Championships in 1994.

== Coaching ==
Altur currently coaches Timofey Skatov, whilst having previously coached Taro Daniel, David Ferrer, Igor Andreev and Carlos Taberner.

== Grand Prix career finals ==
=== Singles: 1 (1–0) ===
Result	W/L	Date	Tournament	Surface	Opponent	Score
Win	1–0	Aug 1989	San Marino	Clay	(Argentina) Roberto Azar	6–7, 6–4, 6–1

== Challenger titles ==
=== Singles: (1) ===
No.	Year	Tournament	Surface	Opponent	Score
1.	1994	Geneva, Switzerland	Clay	(Argentina) Martín Rodríguez	7–6, 6–4

== Top 10 wins ==
#	Player	Rank	Event	Surface	Round	Score	Altur Rank
1993
1.	(Czech Republic) Petr Korda	5	Munich, Germany	Clay	2R	5–7, 6–3, 6–3	171
