= 1993 Canadian Open – Women's doubles =

Women's doubles
- 1993 Canadian Open

Final
- Champions: (Latvia) Larisa Neiland; (Czech Republic) Jana Novotná
- Runners-up: (Spain) Arantxa Sánchez Vicario; (Czech Republic) Helena Suková
- Score: 6–1, 6–2

Details
- Draw: 28
- Seeds: 8

Events
Singles	men	women
Doubles	men	women
- Canadian Open

Lori McNeil and Rennae Stubbs were the defending champions, but lost in the semifinals to Arantxa Sánchez Vicario and Helena Suková.

Larisa Neiland and Jana Novotná won the title by defeating Sánchez Vicario and Suková 6–1, 6–2 in the final.

== Seeds ==
The first four seeds received a bye into the second round.

1. (Latvia) Larisa Neiland / (Czech Republic) Jana Novotná (champions)
2. (Spain) Arantxa Sánchez Vicario / (Czech Republic) Helena Suková (final)
3. (United States) Mary Joe Fernández / (Belarus) Natasha Zvereva (quarterfinals, defaulted)
4. (United States) Lori McNeil / (Australia) Rennae Stubbs (semifinals)
5. (Canada) Jill Hetherington / (United States) Kathy Rinaldi (second round)
6. (United States) Katrina Adams / (Netherlands) Manon Bollegraf (second round)
7. (South Africa) Amanda Coetzer / (Argentina) Inés Gorrochategui (first round)
8. (Italy) Sandra Cecchini / (Argentina) Patricia Tarabini (quarterfinals)

== Draw ==
Key

- Q = Qualifier
- WC = Wild card
- LL = Lucky loser
- Alt = Alternate
- ITF = ITF entry
- PR = Protected ranking
- SR = Special ranking
- SE = Special exempt
- JE = Junior exempt
- JR = Junior Accelerator Programme entrant
- CO = College Accelerator Programme entrant
- NG = Next Gen Accelerator Program entrant
- w/o = Walkover
- r = Retired
- d = Defaulted

=== Finals ===
Semifinals

Final

1
(Latvia) Larisa Neiland
(Czech Republic) Jana Novotná
7^{7}
7^{8}

- (South Africa) Rosalyn Nideffer
- (United States) Chanda Rubin
6^{4}
6^{6}

1
(Latvia) Larisa Neiland
(Czech Republic) Jana Novotná
6
6

2
- (Spain) Arantxa Sánchez Vicario
- (Czech Republic) Helena Suková
1
2

4
- (United States) Lori McNeil
- (Australia) Rennae Stubbs
4
2

2
(Spain) Arantxa Sánchez Vicario
(Czech Republic) Helena Suková
6
6

=== Top half ===
First round

Second round

Quarterfinals

Semifinals

1
(Latvia) L Neiland
(Czech Republic) J Novotná
6
6

(Switzerland) M Maleeva-Fragnière
(United States) L Raymond
3
6
6

- (Switzerland) M Maleeva-Fragnière
- (United States) L Raymond
3
4

WC
- (Canada) M Bernard
- (Canada) C Delisle
6
1
4

1
(Latvia) L Neiland
(Czech Republic) J Novotná
3
6
6

- (United States) A Grossman
- (Canada) P Hy
d

- (Japan) R Hiraki
- (Argentina) M Paz
6
2
3

(Japan) R Hiraki
(Argentina) M Paz

(Japan) R Hiraki
(Argentina) M Paz
6
6

- (France) P Paradis-Mangon
- (France) S Testud
1
5

5
- (Canada) J Hetherington
- (United States) K Rinaldi
3
2

5
(Canada) J Hetherington
(United States) K Rinaldi
6
7

1
(Latvia) L Neiland
(Czech Republic) J Novotná
7^{7}
7^{8}

- (South Africa) R Nideffer
- (United States) C Rubin
6^{4}
6^{6}

3
(United States) MJ Fernández
(Belarus) N Zvereva
6
6

(United States) P Fendick
(United States) M McGrath
6
6

- (United States) P Fendick
- (United States) M McGrath
4
2

- (Bulgaria) K Maleeva
- (France) N Tauziat
4
2

3
- (United States) MJ Fernández
- (Belarus) N Zvereva
d

(South Africa) R Nideffer
(United States) C Rubin
4
6
7

(South Africa) R Nideffer
(United States) C Rubin

Q
- (Indonesia) Y Basuki
- (Japan) N Miyagi
6
3
5

(South Africa) R Nideffer
(United States) C Rubin
7
1
7^{7}

(Netherlands) M Oremans
(Czech Republic) A Strnadová
6
6

- (Netherlands) M Oremans
- (Czech Republic) A Strnadová
5
6
6^{5}

7
- (South Africa) A Coetzer
- (Argentina) I Gorrochategui
3
3

=== Bottom half ===
First round

Second round

Quarterfinals

Semifinals

8
(Italy) S Cecchini
(Argentina) P Tarabini
3
7^{8}
7^{7}

- (United States) N Arendt
- (Australia) K Radford
6
6^{6}
6^{4}

8
(Italy) S Cecchini
(Argentina) P Tarabini
6
6

(South Africa) E Reinach
(New Zealand) J Richardson
3
6
6

- (South Africa) E Reinach
- (New Zealand) J Richardson
4
4

- (United States) S Collins
- (South Africa) M de Swardt
6
3
0

8
- (Italy) S Cecchini
- (Argentina) P Tarabini
4
3

(Italy) L Golarsa
(Netherlands) B Schultz
6
6

4
(United States) L McNeil
(Australia) R Stubbs
6
6

- (Australia) M Jaggard-Lai
- (United States) M Werdel
4
4

- (Italy) L Golarsa
- (Netherlands) B Schultz
3
2

4
(United States) L McNeil
(Australia) R Stubbs
6
6

4
- (United States) L McNeil
- (Australia) R Stubbs
4
2

6
(United States) K Adams
(Netherlands) M Bollegraf
7^{8}
6

2
(Spain) A Sánchez Vicario
(Czech Republic) H Suková
6
6

- (Australia) R McQuillan
- (Germany) C Porwik
6^{6}
2

6
- (United States) K Adams
- (Netherlands) M Bollegraf
6^{5}
3

(Russia) E Maniokova
(Georgia (country)) L Meskhi
6
6

(Russia) E Maniokova
(Georgia (country)) L Meskhi
7^{7}
6

WC
- (Canada) H Kelesi
- (Canada) S Simpson-Alter
2
3

- (Russia) E Maniokova
- (Georgia (country)) L Meskhi
1
1

- (France) I Demongeot
- (France) C Suire
6
3
4

2
(Spain) A Sánchez Vicario
(Czech Republic) H Suková
6
6

(United Kingdom) J Durie
(United States) G Helgeson
2
6
6

- (United Kingdom) J Durie
- (United States) G Helgeson
6^{2}
4

2
(Spain) A Sánchez Vicario
(Czech Republic) H Suková
7^{7}
6
