= 1994 BMW Open – Singles =

Singles
- 1994 BMW Open

Final
- Champion: (Germany) Michael Stich
- Runner-up: (Czech Republic) Petr Korda
- Score: 6–2, 2–6, 6–3

Details
- Draw: 32
- Seeds: 8

Events
Singles	Doubles
← 1993 ·	BMW Open	· 1995 →

Ivan Lendl was the defending champion, but did not participate this year.

Michael Stich won the title, defeating Petr Korda 6–2, 2–6, 6–3 in the final.

== Seeds ==
1. (Germany) Michael Stich (champion)
2. (Ukraine) Andrei Medvedev (first round)
3. (France) Cédric Pioline (second round)
4. (Sweden) Magnus Gustafsson (quarterfinals)
5. (Czech Republic) Petr Korda (final)
6. (Switzerland) Marc Rosset (second round)
7. (France) Arnaud Boetsch (first round)
8. (South Africa) (South Africa) Wayne Ferreira (quarterfinals)

== Draw ==
=== Key ===
- Q = Qualifier
- WC = Wild card
- LL = Lucky loser
- Alt = Alternate
- SE = Special exempt
- PR = Protected ranking
- ITF = ITF entry
- JE = Junior exempt
- w/o = Walkover
- r = Retired
- d = Defaulted
- SR = Special ranking

=== Finals ===
Semifinals
1	(Germany) Michael Stich	6	2	6
(Russia) Andrei Chesnokov	1	6	0
5	(Czech Republic) Petr Korda	6	6
(Germany) Bernd Karbacher	2	3

Final
1	(Germany) Michael Stich	6	2	6
5	(Czech Republic) Petr Korda	2	6	3

=== Top half ===
First round
1	(Germany) M Stich	4	7^{7}	6
(Russia) A Cherkasov	6	6^{4}	1
Q	(Germany) H Dreekmann	6	5	2
(Czech Republic) S Doseděl	4	7	6
(Sweden) H Holm	5	7	6
(Sweden) J Svensson	7	5	2
(Canada) G Rusedski	4	3
8	(South Africa) W Ferreira	6	6
3	(France) C Pioline	3	7	6
(Czech Republic) M Damm	6	5	2
WC	(Germany) D Prinosil	5	1
(Czech Republic) D Rikl	7	6
Q	(Sweden) N Utgren	4	1
(Russia) A Chesnokov	6	6
(Czech Republic) K Nováček	4	4
6	(Switzerland) M Rosset	6	6

Second round
1	(Germany) M Stich	6	6
(Czech Republic) S Doseděl	4	3
(Sweden) H Holm	2	2
8	(South Africa) W Ferreira	6	6
3	(France) C Pioline	3	6^{1}
(Czech Republic) D Rikl	6	7^{7}
(Russia) A Chesnokov	6	6
6	(Switzerland) M Rosset	2	2

Quarterfinals
1	(Germany) M Stich	6	6^{3}	7^{7}
8	(South Africa) W Ferreira	4	7^{7}	6^{1}
(Czech Republic) D Rikl	3	6^{1}
(Russia) A Chesnokov	6	7^{7}

Semifinals
1	(Germany) M Stich	6	2	6
(Russia) A Chesnokov	1	6	0

=== Bottom half ===
First round
5	(Czech Republic) P Korda	6^{4}	7	7
(France) H Leconte	7^{7}	5	5
(Sweden) N Kulti	4	6	3
WC	(Germany) O Gross	6	3	6
Q	(Czech Republic) L Němeček	1	6	4
(Sweden) M Larsson	6	3	6
Q	(Germany) J Knippschild	5	1
4	(Sweden) M Gustafsson	7	6
7	(France) A Boetsch	2	2
(Israel) A Mansdorf	6	6
(Germany) K Braasch	6	6
(Spain) E Sánchez	2	4
WC	(Germany) C-U Steeb	6	6^{1}	4
(Germany) B Karbacher	4	7^{7}	6
(South Africa) M Ondruska	6	2	7^{10}
2	(Ukraine) A Medvedev	3	6	6^{8}

Second round
5	(Czech Republic) P Korda	6	6
WC	(Germany) O Gross	4	2
(Sweden) M Larsson	2	3
4	(Sweden) M Gustafsson	6	6
(Israel) A Mansdorf	7^{7}	6^{4}	7^{8}
(Germany) K Braasch	6^{5}	7^{7}	6^{6}
(Germany) B Karbacher	7^{7}	4	6
(South Africa) M Ondruska	6^{3}	6	4

Quarterfinals
5	(Czech Republic) P Korda	6	6
4	(Sweden) M Gustafsson	4	4
(Israel) A Mansdorf	3	5
(Germany) B Karbacher	6	7

Semifinals
5	(Czech Republic) P Korda	6	6
(Germany) B Karbacher	2	3
