= 1992 BMW Open =

- Date: 27 April – 4 May
- Edition: 76th
- Category: World Series
- Draw: 32S / 16D
- Prize money: $275,000
- Surface: Clay / outdoor
- Location: Munich, Germany
- Venue: MTTC Iphitos

Champions

Singles
- (Sweden) Magnus Larsson

Doubles
- (South Africa) David Adams / (Netherlands) Menno Oosting
| ← 1991 · | BMW Open | · 1993 → |

The 1992 BMW Open was an Association of Tennis Professionals men's tennis tournament held in Munich, Germany. It was the 76th edition of the edition of the tournament and was held from 27 April through 4 May 1992. Unseeded Magnus Larsson won the singles title.

== Finals ==
=== Singles ===
(Sweden) Magnus Larsson defeated (Czechoslovakia) Petr Korda 6–4, 4–6, 6–1

- It was Larsson's 3rd title of the year and the 5th of his career.

=== Doubles ===
(South Africa) David Adams / (Netherlands) Menno Oosting defeated (Czechoslovakia) Tomáš Anzari / (Australia) Carl Limberger 3–6, 7–5, 6–3

- It was Adams's only title of the year and the 1st of his career. It was Oosting's only title of the year and the 1st of his career.
