= 1991 Holsten International =

- Date: 8–15 October
- Edition: 2nd
- Category: World Series
- Draw: 32S / 16D
- Prize money: $260,000
- Surface: Carpet / indoor
- Location: Berlin, Germany
- Venue: Deutschlandhalle

Champions

Singles
- (Czechoslovakia) Petr Korda

Doubles
- (Czechoslovakia) Petr Korda / (Czechoslovakia) Karel Nováček
- European Indoor Championships

The 1991 Holsten International, also known as the European Indoor Championships, was an ATP men's tennis tournament held at the Deutschlandhalle in Berlin, Germany. The tournament was played on indoor carpet courts and was held from 8 October until 15 October 1991.

Fourth-seeded Petr Korda won the singles title by defeating Arnaud Boetsch in the final.

== Finals ==
=== Singles ===
(Czechoslovakia) Petr Korda defeated (France) Arnaud Boetsch, 6–3, 6–4

- It was Korda's 2nd singles title of the year and of his career.

=== Doubles ===
(Czechoslovakia) Petr Korda / (Czechoslovakia) Karel Nováček defeated (Netherlands) Jan Siemerink / (Czechoslovakia) Daniel Vacek, 3–6, 7–5, 7–5
