= Nils Holm =

Swedish tennis player (born 1969)

- Country (sports): Sweden
- Born: 30 October 1969 (age 55)
- Plays: Right-handed
- Prize money: $64,757

Doubles
- Career record: 7–21
- Career titles: 0
- Highest ranking: No. 151 (16 September 1991)

Grand Slam doubles results
- Wimbledon: 2R (1997)
- US Open: 1R (1993)

Nils Holm (born 30 October 1969) is a former professional tennis player from Sweden.

Holm, a doubles specialist, never made a final on the ATP Tour but reached the semi-finals at Bastad in 1989.

He teamed up with his brother Henrik at the 1993 US Open, where they were defeated in the opening round by Wayne Ferreira and Michael Stich. His brother was also his partner in his only other Grand Slam appearance, at the 1997 Wimbledon Championships. On this occasion they made it into the second round, with a win over the British pairing of Martin Lee and James Trotman. They were then eliminated by two Australians, Mark Philippoussis and Patrick Rafter in straight sets.

== Challenger titles ==
=== Doubles: (7) ===
No.	Year	Tournament	Surface	Partner	Opponents	Score
1.	1990	Geneva, Switzerland	Clay	(Sweden) Henrik Holm	(Czechoslovakia) Branislav Stankovič (Czechoslovakia) Richard Vogel	3–6, 7–5, 7–6
2.	1991	São Paulo, Brazil	Clay	(Sweden) Henrik Holm	(United States) John Letts (United States) Tom Mercer	5–7, 6–4, 6–4
3.	1991	Istanbul, Turkey	Hard	(Sweden) Henrik Holm	(Italy) Gianluca Pozzi (Finland) Olli Rahnasto	5–7, 7–5, 6–4
4.	1993	Bruck an der Mur, Austria	Clay	(Sweden) Lars-Anders Wahlgren	(South Africa) Ellis Ferreira (United States) Alexis Hombrecher	0–6, 6–4, 6–4
5.	1993	Fürth, Germany	Clay	(Sweden) Lars-Anders Wahlgren	(Latvia) Ģirts Dzelde (Georgia (country)) Vladimir Gabrichidze	W/O
6.	1993	Scheveningen, Netherlands	Clay	(Sweden) Lars-Anders Wahlgren	(Netherlands) Jacco Eltingh (Netherlands) Paul Haarhuis	6–1, 6–2
7.	1997	Lippstadt, Germany	Carpet	(Sweden) Henrik Holm	(Sweden) Fredrik Bergh (Sweden) Rikard Bergh	7–6, 7–6
