= 1993 Canadian Open – Men's singles =

Men's singles
- 1993 Canadian Open

Final
- Champion: (Sweden) Mikael Pernfors
- Runner-up: (United States) Todd Martin
- Score: 2–6, 6–2, 7–5

Details
- Draw: 56
- Seeds: 16

Events
Singles	men	women
Doubles	men	women
- Canadian Open

Mikael Pernfors defeated Todd Martin in the final, 2–6, 6–2, 7–5 to win the men's singles tennis title at the 1993 Canadian Open.

Andre Agassi was the defending champion, but lost in the quarterfinals to Todd Martin.

== Seeds ==
1. (United States) Pete Sampras (third round)
2. (United States) Jim Courier (third round)
3. (Germany) Boris Becker (third round)
4. (United States) Ivan Lendl (quarterfinals)
5. (United States) Michael Chang (third round)
6. (Czech Republic) Petr Korda (semifinals)
7. (United States) MaliVai Washington (second round)
8. (Russia) Alexander Volkov (quarterfinals)
9. (South Africa) Wayne Ferreira (third round)
10. (Australia) Wally Masur (first round)
11. (United States) Andre Agassi (quarterfinals)
12. (Sweden) Henrik Holm (third round)
13. (United States) Todd Martin (final)
14. (Israel) Amos Mansdorf (first round)
15. (United States) David Wheaton (second round)
16. (United States) Brad Gilbert (first round)

== Draw ==
Key

- Q = Qualifier
- WC = Wild card
- LL = Lucky loser
- Alt = Alternate
- ITF = ITF entry
- PR = Protected ranking
- SR = Special ranking
- SE = Special exempt
- JE = Junior exempt
- JR = Junior Accelerator Programme entrant
- CO = College Accelerator Programme entrant
- NG = Next Gen Accelerator Program entrant
- w/o = Walkover
- r = Retired
- d = Defaulted

=== Finals ===
Semifinals
(United States) Richey Reneberg	3	4
13	(United States) Todd Martin	6	6
6	(Czech Republic) Petr Korda	6^{4}	5
(Sweden) Mikael Pernfors	7^{7}	7

Final
13	(United States) Todd Martin	6	2	5
(Sweden) Mikael Pernfors	2	6	7

=== Top half ===
==== Section 1 ====
First round
(Denmark) K Carlsen	6	6
(Zimbabwe) B Black	4	4
(New Zealand) B Steven	7	6
(France) S Simian	5	2
Q	(United States) K Jones	2	0
15	(United States) D Wheaton	6	6
9	(South Africa) W Ferreira	6	6
(United States) C Adams	3	4
(Brazil) L Mattar	6^{6}	r
(Australia) T Woodbridge	7^{8}
(United States) R Reneberg	6	6
(United States) B Shelton	3	1

Second round
1	(United States) P Sampras	6	6
(Denmark) K Carlsen	1	4
(New Zealand) B Steven	3	6	6
15	(United States) D Wheaton	6	0	4
9	(South Africa) W Ferreira	7^{7}	6
(Australia) T Woodbridge	6^{5}	3
(United States) R Reneberg	6	6
7	(United States) M Washington	3	2

Third round
1	(United States) P Sampras	6^{6}	3
(New Zealand) B Steven	7^{8}	6
9	(South Africa) W Ferreira	3	2
(United States) R Reneberg	6	6

Quarterfinals
(New Zealand) B Steven	6	3	2
(United States) R Reneberg	3	6	6

==== Section 2 ====
First round
Q	(United States) K Evans	6	5	4
WC	(Canada) C Pridham	4	7	6
(United States) D Rostagno	6^{2}	5
(South Africa) G Stafford	7^{7}	7
WC	(Canada) A Sznajder	3	2
13	(United States) T Martin	6	6
11	(United States) A Agassi	6	6
(Germany) P Kühnen	2	4
(United States) P McEnroe	7^{7}	6
(Haiti) R Agénor	6^{3}	2
(United States) A O'Brien	7	1	6
(United States) T Ho	5	6	4

Second round
3	(Germany) B Becker	3	6	6
WC	(Canada) C Pridham	6	3	3
(South Africa) G Stafford	7	2	1
13	(United States) T Martin	5	6	6
11	(United States) A Agassi	6	6
(United States) P McEnroe	1	4
(United States) A O'Brien	2	3
5	(United States) M Chang	6	6

Third round
3	(Germany) B Becker	5	6^{3}
13	(United States) T Martin	7	7^{7}
11	(United States) A Agassi	7^{7}	6
5	(United States) M Chang	6^{3}	3

Quarterfinals
13	(United States) T Martin	7	6
11	(United States) A Agassi	5	3

==== Section 3 ====
First round
(Australia) J Morgan	6	2	2
(United Kingdom) J Bates	2	6	6
Q	(United Kingdom) C Wilkinson	6	0	3
(Austria) A Antonitsch	3	6	6
(United States) J Palmer	6	6^{4}	4
12	(Sweden) H Holm	4	7^{7}	6
14	(Israel) A Mansdorf	3	3
(United States) A Krickstein	6	6
(Sweden) C Bergström	6^{7}	7^{8}	4
WC	(Canada) G Rusedski	7^{9}	6^{6}	6
WC	(Canada) S Lareau	6	6
(Italy) G Pozzi	3	2

Second round
6	(Czech Republic) P Korda	6	6
(United Kingdom) J Bates	3	2
(Austria) A Antonitsch	2	3
12	(Sweden) H Holm	6	6
(United States) A Krickstein	4	6	7
WC	(Canada) G Rusedski	6	3	5
WC	(Canada) S Lareau	2	2
4	(United States) I Lendl	6	6

Third round
6	(Czech Republic) P Korda	6	6
12	(Sweden) H Holm	3	2
(United States) A Krickstein	7^{9}	1	2
4	(United States) I Lendl	6^{7}	6	6

Quarterfinals
6	(Czech Republic) P Korda	7^{7}	6
4	(United States) I Lendl	6^{4}	1

==== Section 4 ====
First round
WC	(Canada) D Nestor	7	6^{7}	2
(Peru) J Yzaga	5	7^{9}	6
Q	(Colombia) M Hadad	6	6
(Czech Republic) M Damm	2	0
(Switzerland) J Hlasek	6	3	6
10	(Australia) W Masur	4	6	3
16	(United States) B Gilbert	4	6^{4}
Q	(Australia) J Stoltenberg	6	7^{7}
(Sweden) M Pernfors	6	7
Q	(South Africa) M Kaplan	2	5
(United States) J Tarango	4	7	6
Q	(Sweden) P Lundgren	6	5	3

Second round
8	(Russia) A Volkov	6	4	6
(Peru) J Yzaga	4	6	3
Q	(Colombia) M Hadad	2	4
(Switzerland) J Hlasek	6	6
Q	(Australia) J Stoltenberg	4	4
(Sweden) M Pernfors	6	6
(United States) J Tarango	4	4
2	(United States) J Courier	6	6

Third round
8	(Russia) A Volkov	6	6
(Switzerland) J Hlasek	1	4
(Sweden) M Pernfors	6	6
2	(United States) J Courier	3	2

Quarterfinals
8	(Russia) A Volkov	2	1
(Sweden) M Pernfors	6	6
