= 1992 BMW Open – Singles =

Singles
- 1992 BMW Open

Final
- Champion: (Sweden) Magnus Larsson
- Runner-up: (Czechoslovakia) Petr Korda
- Score: 6–4, 4–6, 6–1

Details
- Draw: 32
- Seeds: 8

Events
Singles	Doubles
← 1991 ·	BMW Open	· 1993 →

Magnus Gustafsson was the defending champion, but lost in the first round this year.

Magnus Larsson won the title, defeating Petr Korda 6–4, 4–6, 6–1 in the final.

== Seeds ==
1. (Germany) Michael Stich (quarterfinals)
2. (Czechoslovakia) Petr Korda (final)
3. (Sweden) Magnus Gustafsson (first round)
4. (Czechoslovakia) Karel Nováček (quarterfinals)
5. (Netherlands) Richard Krajicek (first round)
6. (United States) Aaron Krickstein (second round)
7. (Italy) Omar Camporese (second round)
8. (Croatia) Goran Prpić (second round)

== Draw ==
=== Key ===
- Q = Qualifier
- WC = Wild card
- LL = Lucky loser
- Alt = Alternate
- SE = Special exempt
- PR = Protected ranking
- ITF = ITF entry
- JE = Junior exempt
- w/o = Walkover
- r = Retired
- d = Defaulted
- SR = Special ranking

=== Finals ===
Semifinals
(Sweden) Magnus Larsson	6^{9}	6	7^{9}
(Germany) Markus Naewie	7^{11}	4	6^{7}
WC	(Germany) Bernd Karbacher	6	6^{6}	5
2	(Czechoslovakia) Petr Korda	3	7^{8}	7

Final
(Sweden) Magnus Larsson	6	4	6
2	(Czechoslovakia) Petr Korda	4	6	1

=== Top half ===
First round
1	(Germany) M Stich	6	6
(Sweden) C Bergström	3	3
(Germany) A Thoms	6	6
(Belgium) B Wuyts	4	4
(Sweden) M Larsson	6^{3}	7^{7}	6
WC	(France) H Leconte	7^{7}	6^{3}	2
(Haiti) R Agénor	4	3
7	(Italy) O Camporese	6	6
3	(Sweden) M Gustafsson	4	0
Q	(Commonwealth of Independent States) A Medvedev	6	6
(France) R Gilbert	6	6
Q	(Czechoslovakia) R Vašek	2	4
(Sweden) J Svensson	2	4
(Argentina) G Pérez Roldán	6	6
(Germany) M Naewie	6	6
5	(Netherlands) R Krajicek	4	4

Second round
1	(Germany) M Stich	6	6
(Germany) A Thoms	3	4
(Sweden) M Larsson	6	6
7	(Italy) O Camporese	2	1
Q	(Commonwealth of Independent States) A Medvedev	6	6
(France) R Gilbert	2	0
(Argentina) G Pérez Roldán	4	6^{6}
(Germany) M Naewie	6	7^{8}

Quarterfinals
1	(Germany) M Stich	4	4
(Sweden) M Larsson	6	6
Q	(Commonwealth of Independent States) A Medvedev	6	6^{5}	4
(Germany) M Naewie	4	7^{7}	6

Semifinals
(Sweden) M Larsson	6^{9}	6	7^{9}
(Germany) M Naewie	7^{11}	4	6^{7}

=== Bottom half ===
First round
6	(United States) A Krickstein	6	6
(Sweden) J Gunnarsson	3	4
(Germany) L Koslowski	7	1	3
WC	(Germany) B Karbacher	5	6	6
Q	(Sweden) D Engel	6	6
(Italy) C Caratti	1	4
Q	(Sweden) L-A Wahlgren	6^{4}	3
4	(Czechoslovakia) K Nováček	7^{7}	6
8	(Croatia) G Prpić	6	6
WC	(Sweden) B Borg	1	0
(France) O Delaître	4	5
(Sweden) N Kulti	6	7
(Austria) T Muster	5	4
(Sweden) L Jonsson	7	6
(Germany) C-U Steeb	2	3
2	(Czechoslovakia) P Korda	6	6

Second round
6	(United States) A Krickstein	2	4
WC	(Germany) B Karbacher	6	6
Q	(Sweden) D Engel	2	1
4	(Czechoslovakia) K Nováček	6	6
8	(Croatia) G Prpić	0	5
(Sweden) N Kulti	6	7
(Sweden) L Jonsson	4	3
2	(Czechoslovakia) P Korda	6	6

Quarterfinals
WC	(Germany) B Karbacher	7	4	6
4	(Czechoslovakia) K Nováček	5	6	1
(Sweden) N Kulti	3	6	3
2	(Czechoslovakia) P Korda	6	3	6

Semifinals
WC	(Germany) B Karbacher	6	6^{6}	5
2	(Czechoslovakia) P Korda	3	7^{8}	7
