= 1994 BMW Open =

- Date: 25 April – 2 May
- Edition: 78th
- Category: World Series
- Draw: 32S / 16D
- Prize money: $400,000
- Surface: Clay / outdoor
- Location: Munich, Germany
- Venue: MTTC Iphitos

Champions

Singles
- (Germany) Michael Stich

Doubles
- (Russia) Yevgeny Kafelnikov / (Czech Republic) David Rikl
- BMW Open

The 1994 BMW Open was an Association of Tennis Professionals men's tennis tournament held on outdoor clay courts at the MTTC Iphitos in Munich, Germany. The event was part of the World Series of the 1994 ATP Tour. It was the 78th edition of the tournament and was held from 25 April through 2 May 1994. First-seeded Michael Stich won the singles title.

== Finals ==
=== Singles ===
(Germany) Michael Stich defeated (Czech Republic) Petr Korda 6–2, 2–6, 6–3

- It was Stich's 2nd singles title of the year and the 15th of his career.

=== Doubles ===
(Russia) Yevgeny Kafelnikov / (Czech Republic) David Rikl defeated (Germany) Boris Becker / (Czech Republic) Petr Korda 7–6, 7–5

- It was Kafelnikov's 5th title of the year and the 5th of his career. It was Rikl's 3rd title of the year and the 6th of his career.
