= Tomáš Anzari =

Czech tennis player (born 1970)

- Country (sports): Czechoslovakia (until 1992); Czech Republic (from 1993)
- Residence: Olomouc, Czech Republic
- Born: 24 June 1970 (age 54); Třinec, Czechoslovakia
- Height: 1.80 m (5 ft 11 in)
- Turned pro: 1989
- Plays: Right-handed
- Prize money: $335,020

Singles
- Career record: 1-14
- Career titles: 0; 0 Challenger, 0 Futures
- Highest ranking: No. 134 (19 August 1991)

Grand Slam singles results
- Australian Open: Q3 (1992, 1993)
- French Open: Q2 (1993, 1994)
- Wimbledon: Q1 (1996)
- US Open: Q1 (1992)

Doubles
- Career record: 37–75
- Career titles: 0; 14 Challenger, 0 Futures
- Highest ranking: No. 80 (22 February 1993)

Grand Slam doubles results
- Australian Open: 1R (1992, 1993, 1998, 1999)
- French Open: 3R (1990)
- Wimbledon: 1R (1990, 1993, 1998)
- US Open: 2R (1992, 1998)

Grand Slam mixed doubles results
- French Open: 1R (1990)
- Last updated on: 5 October 2021.

Tomáš Anzari (born Třinec, 24 June 1970) is a former professional tennis player from the Czech Republic and writer on psychology and stress in sports. He was also known as Tomáš Zdražila.

== Career ==
Anzari, with countryman David Rikl, won the boys' doubles at the ITF World Championships in 1988, the same year that they were number-one-ranked juniors. The pair were runners-up in the 1988 Wimbledon Championships, losing the boys' doubles final to Jason Stoltenberg and Todd Woodbridge. He remained with Rikl after turning professional and at the 1990 French Open, their first Grand Slam tournament in the men's, they reached the third round. It would remain Anzari's best performance in a Grand Slam.

He reached eight doubles semi-finals on the ATP Tour, but only once made it into the final, in 1992, when he and Carl Limberger were runners-up at the BMW Open.

== ATP career finals ==
=== Doubles: 1 (1 runner-up) ===
Legend Grand Slam tournaments (0–0) ATP World Tour Finals (0–0) ATP World Tour Masters Series(0–0) ATP World Tour Championship Series (0–0) ATP World Tour World Series (0–1)	Titles by surface Hard (0–0) Clay (0–1) Grass (0–0) Carpet (0–0)	Titles by setting Outdoor (0–1) Indoor (0–0)

Result	W–L	Date	Tournament	Tier	Surface	Partner	Opponents	Score
Loss	0–1	May 1992	Munich, Germany	World Series	Clay	(Australia) Carl Limberger	(South Africa) David Adams (Netherlands) Menno Oosting	6–3, 5–7, 3–6

== ATP Challenger finals ==
=== Singles: 1 (0–1) ===
Finals by surface
Hard (0–0)
Clay (0–0)
Grass (0–0)
Carpet (0–1)

Result	W–L	Date	Tournament	Tier	Surface	Opponent	Score
Loss	0–1	Dec 1994	Prostějov, Czech Republic	Challenger	Carpet	(Slovakia) Karol Kučera	0–6, 4–6

=== Doubles: 23 (14–9) ===
Finals by surface
Hard (1–1)
Clay (10–6)
Grass (1–0)
Carpet (2–2)

Result	W–L	Date	Tournament	Tier	Surface	Partner	Opponents	Score
Win	1–0	Jan 1990	Heilbronn, West Germany	Challenger	Carpet	(Czech Republic) David Rikl	(South Africa) Byron Talbot (Sweden) Jörgen Windahl	6–4, 6–4
Win	2–0	Mar 1990	Cairo, Egypt	Challenger	Clay	(Czech Republic) David Rikl	(Belgium) Eduardo Masso (Argentina) Christian Miniussi	6–3, 6–7, 7–5
Win	3–0	Apr 1990	Zaragoza, Spain	Challenger	Clay	(Czech Republic) David Rikl	(Spain) Carlos Costa (Spain) Francisco Roig	6–3, 7–6
Win	4–0	Apr 1991	Oporto, Portugal	Challenger	Clay	(Serbia and Montenegro) Dimitri Poliakov	(Netherlands) Paul Haarhuis (Netherlands) Mark Koevermans	3–6, 6–3, 6–4
Loss	4–1	Jun 1991	Seville, Spain	Challenger	Clay	(Czech Republic) Josef Čihák	(Czech Republic) David Rikl (France) Éric Winogradsky	1–6, 7–6, 3–6
Win	5–1	Jul 1991	Oporto, Portugal	Challenger	Clay	(Czech Republic) Josef Čihák	(Spain) Juan Carlos Báguena (Ecuador) Andrés Gómez	7–5, 6–2
Win	6–1	Aug 1991	Pescara, Italy	Challenger	Clay	(Czech Republic) Josef Čihák	(Sweden) Johan Donar (United States) John Sobel	6–3, 6–4
Loss	6–2	Sep 1991	Merano, Italy	Challenger	Clay	(Czech Republic) Josef Čihák	(Spain) Carlos Costa (Argentina) Christian Miniussi	3–6, 3–6
Win	7–2	Apr 1992	Oporto, Portugal	Challenger	Clay	(Australia) Carl Limberger	(United States) Brian Devening (Norway) Bent-Ove Pedersen	3–6, 6–1, 6–4
Loss	7–3	Jun 1992	Yvetot, France	Challenger	Clay	(Brazil) Jaime Oncins	(Sweden) Mikael Tillström (Sweden) Mårten Renström	6–7, 7–5, 2–6
Win	8–3	Oct 1992	Reggio Calabria, Italy	Challenger	Clay	(South Africa) Brent Haygarth	(Portugal) João Cunha-Silva (Ukraine) Dimitri Poliakov	6–4, 7–6
Loss	8–4	Oct 1992	Cherbourg, France	Challenger	Carpet	(Netherlands) Joost Winnink	(Germany) Christian Saceanu (United States) Kent Kinnear	1–6, 4–6
Win	9–4	May 1994	Cali, Colombia	Challenger	Clay	(Portugal) João Cunha-Silva	(South Africa) Kirk Haygarth (United States) Bill Behrens	7–6, 3–6, 6–3
Win	10–4	Nov 1994	Rogaška, Slovenia	Challenger	Carpet	(Czech Republic) Jan Kodeš	(United Kingdom) Barry Cowan (United Kingdom) Andrew Richardson	6–5, 6–3
Loss	10–5	May 1995	Sliema, Malta	Challenger	Hard	(Germany) Patrick Baur	(South Africa) Marius Barnard (France) Lionel Barthez	5–7, 3–6
Loss	10–6	Jul 1995	Ostend, Belgium	Challenger	Clay	(Portugal) Emanuel Couto	(South Africa) Clinton Ferreira (North Macedonia) Aleksandar Kitinov	6–3, 6–7, 3–6
Loss	10–7	Mar 1997	Magdeburg, Germany	Challenger	Carpet	(Czech Republic) Petr Luxa	(United States) Trey Phillips (United Kingdom) Chris Wilkinson	3–6, 4–6
Win	11–7	Jun 1997	Zagreb, Croatia	Challenger	Clay	(Mexico) David Roditi	(South Africa) Paul Rosner (United States) Brandon Coupe	3–6, 7–6, 7–6
Win	12–7	Aug 1997	Poznań, Poland	Challenger	Clay	(Czech Republic) David Rikl	(Spain) Jordi Burillo (Hungary) László Markovits	6–3, 6–2
Loss	12–8	Apr 1998	Espinho, Portugal	Challenger	Clay	(Spain) Alberto Martín	(Germany) Jens Knippschild (Netherlands) Stephen Noteboom	6–7, 5–7
Loss	12–9	May 1998	Ljubljana, Slovenia	Challenger	Clay	(Spain) Alberto Martín	(South Africa) Marius Barnard (Netherlands) Stephen Noteboom	6–7, 7–6, 6–7
Win	13–9	Dec 1999	Jaipur, India	Challenger	Grass	(Japan) Satoshi Iwabuchi	(Croatia) Ivo Karlović (Kazakhstan) Yuri Schukin	7–6, 4–6, 7–6
Win	14–9	Mar 2000	Bombay, India	Challenger	Hard	(Japan) Satoshi Iwabuchi	(France) Maxime Boyé (Israel) Eyal Erlich	7–6^{(11–9)}, 6–4

== Performance timelines ==
Key
W	F	SF	QF	#R	RR	Q#	DNQ	A	NH

(W) winner; (F) finalist; (SF) semifinalist; (QF) quarterfinalist; (#R) rounds 4, 3, 2, 1; (RR) round-robin stage; (Q#) qualification round; (DNQ) did not qualify; (A) absent; (NH) not held; (SR) strike rate (events won / competed); (W–L) win–loss record.

=== Singles ===
Tournament	1992	1993	1994	1995	1996	SR	W–L	Win %
Grand Slam tournaments
Australian Open	Q3	Q3	A	A	A	0 / 0	0–0	–
French Open	A	Q2	Q2	A	A	0 / 0	0–0	–
Wimbledon	A	A	A	A	Q1	0 / 0	0–0	–
US Open	Q1	A	A	A	A	0 / 0	0–0	–
Win–loss	0–0	0–0	0–0	0–0	0–0	0 / 0	0–0	–
ATP Tour Masters 1000
Miami	A	A	A	A	Q2	0 / 0	0–0	–
Monte Carlo	A	1R	A	A	A	0 / 1	0–1	0%
Stuttgart	Q2	A	A	A	Q2	0 / 0	0–0	–
Hamburg	A	Q2	A	A	A	0 / 0	0–0	–
Paris	Q1	A	A	A	A	0 / 0	0–0	–
Win–loss	0–0	0–1	0–0	0–0	0–0	0 / 1	0–1	0%

=== Doubles ===
Tournament	1990	1991	1992	1993	1994	1995	1996	1997	1998	1999	SR	W–L	Win %
Grand Slam tournaments
Australian Open	A	A	1R	1R	A	A	A	A	1R	1R	0 / 4	0–4	0%
French Open	3R	A	2R	A	A	A	A	A	2R	A	0 / 3	4–3	57%
Wimbledon	1R	A	A	1R	A	A	A	A	1R	A	0 / 3	0–3	0%
US Open	A	A	A	2R	A	A	A	A	2R	A	0 / 2	2–2	50%
Win–loss	2–2	0–0	1–2	1–3	0–0	0–0	0–0	0–0	2–4	0–1	0 / 12	6–12	85%
ATP Tour Masters 1000
Monte Carlo	1R	A	A	A	Q1	A	A	A	A	Q2	0 / 1	0–1	0%
Stuttgart	A	A	1R	A	A	A	A	A	2R	1R	0 / 3	1–3	25%
Hamburg	1R	A	A	A	A	A	A	A	A	A	0 / 1	0–1	0%
Rome	1R	A	A	A	A	A	A	A	A	A	0 / 1	0–1	0%
Win–loss	0–3	0–0	0–1	0–0	0–0	0–0	0–0	0–0	1–1	0–1	0 / 6	1–6	14%

== Junior Grand Slam finals ==
=== Doubles: 1 (1 runner-up) ===
Result	Year	Tournament	Surface	Partnet	Opponents	Score
Loss	1988	Wimbledon	Grass	(Czech Republic) David Rikl	(Australia) Todd Woodbridge (Australia) Jason Stoltenberg	4–6, 6–1, 5–7
