= Markus Naewie =

German tennis player

- Country (sports): Germany
- Residence: Beckum
- Born: 7 January 1970 (age 55); Bremen, West Germany
- Height: 1.90 m (6 ft 3 in)
- Turned pro: 1990
- Plays: Right-handed
- Prize money: $307,182

Singles
- Career record: 21–36
- Career titles: 0
- Highest ranking: No. 70 (28 Sep 1992)

Grand Slam singles results
- Australian Open: 1R (1993, 1994)
- French Open: 2R (1992)
- Wimbledon: 1R (1992)
- US Open: 1R (1992)

Doubles
- Career record: 8–14
- Career titles: 0
- Highest ranking: No. 147 (10 Aug 1992)

Markus Naewie (born 7 January 1970) is a former professional tennis player from Germany.

Naewie had his best year on tour in 1992, when he broke into the top 100 of the ATP rankings. He defeated Jason Stoltenberg in the French Open that year and almost upset 14th seed Alexander Volkov in the second round, taking him to five sets. At the Heineken Open in Auckland he was a quarter-finalist and he also made the semi-finals of Munich's BMW Open. In the latter he defeated Richard Krajicek, the world number 17, in the opening round and only missed out on a spot in the final when he lost a final set tiebreak 7–9 to Magnus Larsson. Also that year, Naewie and partner Lars Koslowski made the quarter-finals of the German Open, an ATP Super 9 event, defeating en route the Grand Slam winning pairing of Scott Davis and David Pate. In the Swedish Open he teamed up with Menno Oosting to reach the semi-finals.

The German dropped out of the top 100 in 1993 but did manage to reach a quarter-final in Gstaad. In the doubles he and Bernd Karbacher were semi-finalists in Munich. He blew a two set lead against Jeff Tarango in the 1993 French Open, having earlier lost a five setter that year to Daniel Vasek in the Australian Open.

== Challenger titles ==
=== Singles: (2) ===
No.	Year	Tournament	Surface	Opponent	Score
1.	1991	Nyon, Switzerland	Clay	(Georgia (country)) Vladimir Gabrichidze	6–3, 7–5
2.	1993	Agadir, Morocco	Clay	(Argentina) Martín Jaite	6–2, 7–5
