= European Indoor Championships =

ITF Berlin Open

Defunct tennis tournament
- Event name: European Indoor Championships
- Tour: ATP Tour
- Founded: 1990
- Abolished: 1991
- Editions: 2
- Location: Berlin, Germany
- Surface: Carpet / indoor

The European Indoor Championships was a men's tennis tournament played in Berlin, Germany. The event was played as part of the ATP Tour in 1990 and 1991. It was played on indoor carpet courts.

According to the ATP website, its place in the calendar was preceded by the Frankfurt Cup (1987 to 1989) and followed by the ATP Bolzano (1992 and 1993).

== Finals ==
=== Singles ===
Year	Champions	Runners-up	Score
1990	(Haiti) Ronald Agénor	(Soviet Union) Alexander Volkov	4–6, 6–4, 7–6
1991	(Czechoslovakia) Petr Korda	(France) Arnaud Boetsch	6–3, 6–4

=== Doubles ===
Year	Champions	Runners-up	Score
1990	(South Africa) Pieter Aldrich (South Africa) Danie Visser	(United States) Kevin Curren (United States) Patrick Galbraith	7–6, 7–6
1991	(Czechoslovakia) Petr Korda (Czechoslovakia) Karel Nováček	(Netherlands) Jan Siemerink (Czechoslovakia) Daniel Vacek	3–6, 7–5, 7–5

== See also ==
- Berlin Open - Berlin men's clay court tournament (1973–1979)
