= Henrik Holm (tennis) =

Swedish tennis player

- Country (sports): Sweden
- Residence: Monte Carlo, Monaco
- Born: 22 August 1968 (age 57) Täby, Sweden
- Height: 1.83 m (6 ft 0 in)
- Turned pro: 1988
- Retired: 1999
- Plays: Right-handed (two-handed backhand)
- Prize money: $1,693,931

Singles
- Career record: 96–110
- Career titles: 0
- Highest ranking: No. 17 (5 July 1993)

Grand Slam singles results
- Australian Open: 3R (1994)
- French Open: 2R (1993, 1994)
- Wimbledon: 4R (1992)
- US Open: 3R (1993)

Doubles
- Career record: 95–91
- Career titles: 5
- Highest ranking: No. 10 (16 May 1994)

Grand Slam doubles results
- Australian Open: 3R (1994)
- French Open: 2R (1994)
- Wimbledon: 2R (1991, 1992, 1995, 1997)
- US Open: 2R (1992)

Henrik Holm (born 22 August 1968) is a former professional tennis player from Sweden, who turned professional in 1988. The right-hander won five doubles titles, reached the quarterfinals of the 1992 Stockholm Masters and achieved a career-high ATP singles ranking of world No. 17 in July 1993.

== Career ==
Holm started playing tennis at the age of five. His father, Christer, played Davis Cup for Sweden and was ranked No. 2 in his country during the mid-1960s. His mother, Gun, is a tennis coach. In July 1992 Holm reached his first career Tour singles final in Washington, losing to Petr Korda. Later that year he reached the final at the Tokyo Indoor, losing to Ivan Lendl. In the third round of that tournament he handed Boris Becker his worst career indoor loss (6–1, 6–2).

== ATP career finals ==
=== Singles: 2 (2 runner-ups) ===
Legend Grand Slam Tournaments (0–0) ATP World Tour Finals (0–0) ATP Masters Series (0–0) ATP Championship Series (0–2) ATP World Series (0–0)	Finals by surface Hard (0–1) Clay (0–0) Grass (0–0) Carpet (0–1)	Finals by setting Outdoors (0–1) Indoors (0–1)

Result	W–L	Date	Tournament	Tier	Surface	Opponent	Score
Loss	0–1	Jul 1992	Washington, United States	Championship Series	Hard	(Czech Republic) Petr Korda	4–6, 4–6
Loss	0–2	Oct 1992	Tokyo, Japan	Championship Series	Carpet	(United States) Ivan Lendl	6–7^{(7–9)}, 4–6

=== Doubles: 9 (5 titles, 4 runner-ups) ===
Legend Grand Slam Tournaments (0–0) ATP World Tour Finals (0–0) ATP Masters Series (0–2) ATP Championship Series (1–0) ATP World Series (4–2)	Finals by surface Hard (1–3) Clay (1–1) Grass (0–0) Carpet (3–0)	Finals by setting Outdoors (2–3) Indoors (3–1)

Result	W–L	Date	Tournament	Tier	Surface	Partner	Opponents	Score
Loss	0–1	Jan 1993	Kuala Lumpur, Malaysia	World Series	Hard	(Norway) Bent-Ove Pedersen	(Netherlands) Jacco Eltingh (Netherlands) Paul Haarhuis	5–7, 3–6
Win	1–1	Feb 1993	Rotterdam, Netherlands	World Series	Carpet	(Sweden) Anders Järryd	(South Africa) David Adams (Russia) Andrei Olhovskiy	6–4, 7–6
Win	2–1	May 1993	Munich, Germany	World Series	Clay	(Czech Republic) Martin Damm	(Germany) Carl-Uwe Steeb (Czech Republic) Karel Nováček	6–0, 3–6, 7–5
Win	3–1	Jul 1993	Båstad, Sweden	World Series	Carpet	(Sweden) Anders Järryd	(United States) Brian Devening (Sweden) Tomas Nydahl	6–1, 3–6, 6–3
Loss	3–2	Aug 1993	Cincinnati, United States	Masters Series	Hard	(Sweden) Stefan Edberg	(United States) Andre Agassi (Czech Republic) Petr Korda	6–7, 4–6
Win	4–2	Mar 1994	Zaragoza, Spain	World Series	Carpet	(Sweden) Anders Järryd	(Czech Republic) Martin Damm (Czech Republic) Karel Nováček	7–5, 6–2
Win	5–2	Apr 1994	Tokyo, Japan	Championship Series	Hard	(Sweden) Anders Järryd	(Canada) Sébastien Lareau (United States) Patrick McEnroe	7–6, 6–1
Loss	5–3	May 1994	Hamburg, Germany	Masters Series	Clay	(Sweden) Anders Järryd	(United States) Scott Melville (South Africa) Piet Norval	3–6, 4–6
Loss	5–4	Sep 1995	Bordeaux, France	World Series	Hard	(United Kingdom) Danny Sapsford	(Croatia) Saša Hirszon (Croatia) Goran Ivanišević	3–6, 4–6

== ATP Challenger and ITF Futures finals ==
=== Singles: 9 (6–3) ===
Legend ATP Challenger (6–3) ITF Futures (0–0)	Finals by surface Hard (3–1) Clay (0–0) Grass (1–0) Carpet (2–2)

Result	W–L	Date	Tournament	Tier	Surface	Opponent	Score
Win	1-0	Jul 1989	Dublin, Ireland	Challenger	Carpet	(Italy) Cristiano Caratti	6–0, 4–6, 6–3
Win	2-0	Jul 1990	Aptos, United States	Challenger	Hard	(United States) Brian Garrow	1–6, 6–3, 7–6
Loss	2-1	Sep 1990	Gevrey-Chambertin, France	Challenger	Carpet	(France) Guillaume Raoux	6–2, 4–6, 4–6
Loss	2-2	Sep 1990	Thessaloniki, Greece	Challenger	Carpet	(Germany) Christian Geyer	6–7, 3–6
Loss	2-3	Sep 1991	Azores, Portugal	Challenger	Hard	(South Africa) Marcos Ondruska	3–6, 6–2, 6–7
Win	3-3	Aug 1992	Istanbul, Turkey	Challenger	Hard	(France) Stephane Simian	7–6, 6–2
Win	4-3	Sep 1992	Azores, Portugal	Challenger	Hard	(Denmark) Kenneth Carlsen	6–4, 6–3
Win	5-3	Jun 1995	Annenheim, Austria	Challenger	Grass	(Czech Republic) Martin Damm	6–2, 6–3
Win	6-3	Jan 1997	Heilbronn, Germany	Challenger	Carpet	(Germany) Hendrik Dreekmann	6–3, 2–6, 6–0

=== Doubles: 11 (7–4) ===
Legend ATP Challenger (7–4) ITF Futures (0–0)	Finals by surface Hard (3–2) Clay (3–1) Grass (0–0) Carpet (1–1)

Result	W–L	Date	Tournament	Tier	Surface	Partner	Opponents	Score
Win	1–0	Mar 1990	Jerusalem, Israel	Challenger	Hard	(Sweden) Peter Nyborg	(Italy) Cristian Brandi (Italy) Cristiano Caratti	6–1, 2–6, 6–3
Win	2–0	Aug 1990	Geneva, Switzerland	Challenger	Clay	(Sweden) Nils Holm	(Czech Republic) Branislav Stankovič (Czech Republic) Richard Vogel	3–6, 7–5, 7–6
Loss	2–1	Sep 1990	Venice, Italy	Challenger	Clay	(Sweden) Nils Holm	(Italy) Cristian Brandi (Italy) Federico Mordegan	1–6, 4–6
Loss	2–2	Dec 1990	Bossonnens, Switzerland	Challenger	Hard	(Sweden) Nils Holm	(Netherlands) Michiel Schapers (The Bahamas) Roger Smith	2–6, 6–7
Win	3–2	Feb 1991	São Paulo, Brazil	Challenger	Clay	(Sweden) Nils Holm	(United States) John Letts (United States) Tom Mercer	5–7, 6–4, 6–4
Win	4–2	Sep 1991	Istanbul, Turkey	Challenger	Hard	(Sweden) Nils Holm	(Italy) Gianluca Pozzi (Finland) Olli Rahnasto	5–7, 7–5, 6–4
Loss	4–3	Sep 1991	Azores, Portugal	Challenger	Hard	(Sweden) Peter Nyborg	(Zimbabwe) Byron Black (United States) T.J. Middleton	3–6, 6–4, 6–7
Win	5–3	Sep 1992	Azores, Portugal	Challenger	Hard	(Sweden) Nicklas Utgren	(United States) Donny Isaak (Sweden) Peter Nyborg	7–6, 7–6
Win	6–3	Apr 1994	Monte Carlo, Monaco	Challenger	Clay	(Sweden) Magnus Larsson	(Italy) Cristian Brandi (Italy) Federico Mordegan	7–6, 6–2
Win	7–3	Feb 1997	Lippstadt, Germany	Challenger	Carpet	(Sweden) Nils Holm	(Sweden) Fredrik Bergh (Sweden) Rikard Bergh	7–6, 7–6
Loss	7–4	Feb 1997	Wolfsburg, Germany	Challenger	Carpet	(Sweden) Nils Holm	(Italy) Nicola Bruno (Italy) Laurence Tieleman	6–7, 4–6

== Performance timelines ==
Key
W	F	SF	QF	#R	RR	Q#	DNQ	A	NH

(W) winner; (F) finalist; (SF) semifinalist; (QF) quarterfinalist; (#R) rounds 4, 3, 2, 1; (RR) round-robin stage; (Q#) qualification round; (DNQ) did not qualify; (A) absent; (NH) not held; (SR) strike rate (events won / competed); (W–L) win–loss record.

=== Singles ===
Tournament	1989	1990	1991	1992	1993	1994	1995	1996	1997	SR	W–L	Win %
Grand Slam tournaments
Australian Open	A	A	A	A	2R	3R	1R	1R	A	0 / 4	3–4	43%
French Open	A	A	A	1R	2R	2R	A	A	A	0 / 3	2–3	40%
Wimbledon	2R	1R	2R	4R	3R	A	Q2	A	1R	0 / 6	7–6	54%
US Open	A	A	1R	2R	3R	2R	A	A	A	0 / 4	4–4	50%
Win–loss	1–1	0–1	1–2	4–3	6–4	4–3	0–1	0–1	0–1	0 / 17	16–17	48%
ATP Masters Series
Indian Wells	A	A	A	A	A	A	Q3	A	A	0 / 0	0–0	–
Miami	A	A	A	A	2R	A	2R	A	A	0 / 2	1–2	33%
Monte Carlo	A	A	A	A	1R	1R	Q1	A	A	0 / 2	0–2	0%
Hamburg	A	A	A	A	A	1R	A	A	A	0 / 1	0–1	0%
Canada	A	A	1R	3R	3R	1R	A	A	A	0 / 4	4–4	50%
Cincinnati	A	A	A	A	2R	2R	A	A	A	0 / 2	2–2	50%
Paris	A	A	A	A	1R	A	A	A	A	0 / 1	0–1	0%
Win–loss	0–0	0–0	0–1	2–1	3–5	1–4	1–1	0–0	0–0	0 / 12	7–12	37%

=== Doubles ===
Tournament	1989	1990	1991	1992	1993	1994	1995	1996	1997	SR	W–L	Win %
Grand Slam tournaments
Australian Open	A	A	A	A	1R	3R	2R	A	A	0 / 3	3–3	50%
French Open	A	A	A	A	1R	2R	A	A	A	0 / 2	1–2	33%
Wimbledon	Q1	1R	2R	2R	1R	1R	2R	A	2R	0 / 7	4–7	36%
US Open	A	A	A	2R	1R	1R	A	A	A	0 / 3	1–3	25%
Win–loss	0–0	0–1	1–1	2–2	0–4	3–4	2–2	0–0	1–1	0 / 15	9–15	38%
ATP Masters Series
Indian Wells	A	A	A	A	A	A	1R	A	A	0 / 1	0–1	0%
Miami	A	A	A	A	1R	A	3R	A	A	0 / 2	2–2	50%
Monte Carlo	A	A	A	A	A	2R	1R	A	A	0 / 2	1–2	33%
Hamburg	A	A	A	A	A	F	1R	A	A	0 / 2	4–2	67%
Canada	A	A	1R	A	2R	2R	A	A	A	0 / 3	1–3	25%
Cincinnati	A	A	A	A	F	2R	A	A	A	0 / 2	5–2	71%
Paris	A	A	A	A	SF	A	A	A	A	0 / 1	3–1	75%
Win–loss	0–0	0–0	0–1	0–0	8–4	6–4	2–4	0–0	0–0	0 / 13	16–13	55%

Awards
Preceded by Jim Courier	ATP Most Improved Player; 1992	Succeeded by Todd Martin
