= Pat Rafter career statistics =

Career finals
Discipline	Type	Won	Lost	Total	WR ^{1}
Singles	Grand Slam tournaments	2	2	4	0.50
Singles	Year-end championships	0	1	1	0.00
Singles	ATP Masters 1000 ^{2}	2	4	6	0.33
Singles	Summer Olympic Games	–	–	–	–
Singles	ATP Tour 500	1	2	3	0.33
Singles	ATP Tour 250	6	5	11	0.55
Singles	Total ^{3}	11	14	25	0.44
Doubles	Grand Slam tournaments	1	–	1	1.00
Doubles	Year-end championships	–	–	–	–
Doubles	ATP Masters 1000 ^{2}	2	2	4	0.50
Doubles	Olympic Games	–	–	–	–
Doubles	ATP Tour 500	–	1	1	0.00
Doubles	ATP Tour 250	7	5	12	0.63
Doubles	Total	10	8	18	0.59
Total ^{3}		21	22	43	0.50
^{1)} WR = Winning Rate^{2)} Formerly known as "Super 9" (1996–1999), "Tennis Masters Series" (2000–2003) or "ATP Masters Series" (2004–2008)^{3)} Includes Grand Slam Cup runner-up result

This is a list of main career statistics of Australian former professional tennis player Pat Rafter. All statistics are according to the ATP World Tour and ITF website.

== Grand Slam tournaments ==
=== Singles: 4 (2 titles, 2 runner-ups) ===
Result	Year	Championship	Surface	Opponent	Score
Win	1997	US Open	Hard	(United Kingdom) Greg Rusedski	6–3, 6–2, 4–6, 7–5
Win	1998	US Open (2)	Hard	(Australia) Mark Philippoussis	6–3, 3–6, 6–2, 6–0
Loss	2000	Wimbledon	Grass	(United States) Pete Sampras	7–6^{(12–10)}, 6–7^{(5–7)}, 4–6, 2–6
Loss	2001	Wimbledon	Grass	(Croatia) Goran Ivanišević	3–6, 6–3, 3–6, 6–2, 7–9

=== Doubles: 1 (1 title) ===
Result	Year	Championship	Surface	Partner	Opponents	Score
Win	1999	Australian Open	Hard	(Sweden) Jonas Björkman	(India) Mahesh Bhupathi (India) Leander Paes	6–3, 4–6, 6–4, 6–7^{(10–12)}, 6–4

== Other significant finals ==
=== Grand Slam Cup finals ===
==== Singles: 1 (1 runner-up) ====
Result	Year	Location	Surface	Opponent	Score
Loss	1997	Munich, Germany	Hard (i)	(United States) Pete Sampras	2–6, 4–6, 5–7

=== Masters Series tournaments ===
==== Singles: 6 (2 titles, 4 runner-ups) ====
Result	Year	Tournament	Surface	Opponent	Score
Win	1998	Canadian Open	Hard	(Netherlands) Richard Krajicek	7–6^{(7–3)}, 6–4
Win	1998	Cincinnati Masters	Hard	(United States) Pete Sampras	1–6, 7–6^{(7–2)}, 6–4
Loss	1999	Italian Open	Clay	(Brazil) Gustavo Kuerten	4–6, 5–7, 6–7^{(6–8)}
Loss	1999	Cincinnati Masters	Hard	(United States) Pete Sampras	6–7^{(7–9)}, 3–6
Loss	2001	Canadian Open	Hard	(Romania) Andrei Pavel	6–7^{(3–7)}, 6–2, 3–6
Loss	2001	Cincinnati Masters	Hard	(Brazil) Gustavo Kuerten	1–6, 3–6

==== Doubles: 4 (2 titles, 2 runner-ups) ====
Result	Year	Tournament	Surface	Partner	Opponents	Score
Loss	1997	Indian Wells Masters	Hard	(Australia) Mark Philippoussis	(The Bahamas) Mark Knowles (Canada) Daniel Nestor	6–7, 6–4, 5–7
Loss	1997	Cincinnati Masters	Hard	(Australia) Mark Philippoussis	(Australia) Todd Woodbridge (Australia) Mark Woodforde	6–7, 6–4, 4–6
Win	1998	Indian Wells Masters	Hard	(Sweden) Jonas Björkman	(United States) Todd Martin (United States) Richey Reneberg	6–4, 7–6
Win	1999	Canadian Open	Hard	(Sweden) Jonas Björkman	(Zimbabwe) Byron Black (South Africa) Wayne Ferreira	7–6, 6–4

== Career finals ==
=== ATP Tour finals ===
==== Singles: 25 (11 titles, 14 runner-ups) ====
Legend Grand Slam (2–2) Grand Slam Cup (0–1) ATP Masters Series (2–4) ATP Championship Series (1–2) ATP Tour (6–5)	Finals by surface Hard (7–8) Clay (0–2) Grass (4–2) Carpet (0–2)	Finals by setting Outdoors (11–13) Indoors (0–1)

Result	No.	Date	Tournament	Surface	Opponent	Score
Loss	1.	Apr 1994	Hong Kong, UK	Hard	(United States) Michael Chang	1–6, 3–6
Win	1.	Jun 1994	Manchester Open, UK	Grass	(South Africa) Wayne Ferreira	7–6^{(7–5)}, 7–6^{(7–4)}
Loss	2.	Mar 1997	Philadelphia, USA	Hard (i)	(United States) Pete Sampras	7–5, 6–7^{(4–7)}, 3–6
Loss	3.	Apr 1997	Hong Kong, UK	Hard	(United States) Michael Chang	3–6, 3–6
Loss	4.	May 1997	St. Poelten, Austria	Clay	(Uruguay) Marcelo Filippini	6–7^{(2–7)}, 2–6
Loss	5.	Aug 1997	New Haven, USA	Hard	(Russia) Yevgeny Kafelnikov	6–7^{(4–7)}, 4–6
Loss	6.	Aug 1997	Long Island, USA	Hard	(Spain) Carlos Moyá	4–6, 6–7^{(1–7)}
Win	2.	Sep 1997	US Open, USA	Hard	(United Kingdom) Greg Rusedski	6–3, 6–2, 4–6, 7–5
Loss	7.	Oct 1997	Grand Slam Cup, Germany	Carpet (i)	(United States) Pete Sampras	2–6, 4–6, 5–7
Win	3.	Apr 1998	Madras, India	Hard	(Sweden) Mikael Tillström	6–3, 6–4
Win	4.	Jun 1998	's-Hertogenbosch, Netherlands	Grass	(Czech Republic) Martin Damm	7–6^{(7–2)}, 6–2
Win	5.	Aug 1998	Toronto, Canada	Hard	(Netherlands) Richard Krajicek	7–6^{(7–3)}, 6–4
Win	6.	Aug 1998	Cincinnati, USA	Hard	(United States) Pete Sampras	1–6, 7–6^{(7–2)}, 6–4
Win	7.	Aug 1998	Long Island, USA	Hard	(Spain) Félix Mantilla	7–6^{(7–3)}, 6–2
Win	8.	Sep 1998	US Open, USA	Hard	(Australia) Mark Philippoussis	6–3, 3–6, 6–2, 6–0
Loss	8.	May 1999	Rome, Italy	Clay	(Brazil) Gustavo Kuerten	4–6, 5–7, 6–7^{(6–8)}
Win	9.	Jun 1999	's-Hertogenbosch, Netherlands	Grass	(Romania) Andrei Pavel	3–6, 7–6^{(9–7)}, 6–4
Loss	9.	Aug 1999	Cincinnati, USA	Hard	(United States) Pete Sampras	6–7^{(7–9)}, 3–6
Win	10.	Jun 2000	's-Hertogenbosch, Netherlands	Grass	(France) Nicolas Escudé	6–1, 6–3
Loss	10.	Jul 2000	Wimbledon, UK	Grass	(United States) Pete Sampras	7–6^{(12–10)}, 6–7^{(5–7)}, 4–6, 2–6
Loss	11.	Nov 2000	Lyon, France	Carpet (i)	(France) Arnaud Clément	6–7^{(2–7)}, 6–7^{(5–7)}
Loss	12.	Jul 2001	Wimbledon, UK	Grass	(Croatia) Goran Ivanišević	3–6, 6–3, 3–6, 6–2, 7–9
Loss	13.	Aug 2001	Montréal, Canada	Hard	(Romania) Andrei Pavel	6–7^{(3–7)}, 6–2, 3–6
Loss	14.	Aug 2001	Cincinnati, USA	Hard	(Brazil) Gustavo Kuerten	1–6, 3–6
Win	11.	Aug 2001	Indianapolis, USA	Hard	(Brazil) Gustavo Kuerten	4–2 ret.

==== Doubles: 18 (10 titles, 8 runner-ups) ====
Legend Grand Slam (1–0) Tennis Masters Cup (0–0) ATP Masters Series (2–2) ATP Championship Series (0–1) ATP Tour (7–5)	Finals by surface Hard (6–4) Clay (2–1) Grass (2–1) Carpet (0–2)	Finals by setting Outdoors (10–8) Indoors (0–0)

Result	No.	Date	Tournament	Surface	Partner	Opponents	Score
Loss	1.	Apr 1994	Salem Open, Hong Kong	Hard	(Sweden) Jonas Björkman	(United States) Jim Grabb (New Zealand) Brett Steven	w/o
Win	1.	May 1994	Bologna Open, Italy	Clay	(Australia) John Fitzgerald	(Czech Republic) Vojtěch Flégl (Australia) Andrew Florent	6–3, 6–3
Loss	2.	Oct 1994	Grand Prix de Tennis de Lyon, France	Carpet (i)	(Czech Republic) Martin Damm	(Switzerland) Jakob Hlasek (Russia) Yevgeny Kafelnikov	7–6, 6–7, 6–7
Win	2.	Jan 1995	Australian Hard Court Championships, Adelaide	Hard	(United States) Jim Courier	(Zimbabwe) Byron Black (Canada) Grant Connell	7–6, 6–4
Loss	3.	Oct 1995	Ostrava, Czech Republic	Carpet (i)	(France) Guy Forget	(Sweden) Jonas Björkman (Argentina) Javier Frana	7–6, 4–6, 6–7
Loss	4.	Apr 1996	Bermuda Open, USA	Clay	(Australia) Pat Cash	(Sweden) Jan Apell (South Africa) Brent Haygarth	6–3, 1–6, 3–6
Win	3.	May 1996	U.S. Men's Clay Court Championships, Pinehurst	Clay	(Australia) Pat Cash	(United States) Ken Flach (United States) David Wheaton	6–2, 6–3
Win	4.	Jan 1997	Australian Hardcourt Championships, Adelaide	Hard	(United States) Bryan Shelton	(Australia) Todd Woodbridge (Australia) Mark Woodforde	6–4, 1–6, 6–3
Loss	5.	Mar 1997	Indian Wells Masters, USA	Hard	(Australia) Mark Philippoussis	(The Bahamas) Mark Knowles (Canada) Daniel Nestor	6–7, 6–4, 5–7
Loss	6.	Apr 1997	Japan Open Tennis Championships, Tokyo	Hard	(United States) Justin Gimelstob	(Czech Republic) Martin Damm (Czech Republic) Daniel Vacek	6–2, 2–6, 6–7
Win	5.	Jun 1997	Queen's Club Championships, UK	Grass	(Australia) Mark Philippoussis	(Australia) Sandon Stolle (Czech Republic) Cyril Suk	6–2, 4–6, 7–5
Loss	7.	Aug 1997	Cincinnati Masters, USA	Hard	(Australia) Mark Philippoussis	(Australia) Todd Woodbridge (Australia) Mark Woodforde	6–7, 6–4, 4–6
Win	6.	Mar 1998	Newsweek Champions Cup, USA	Hard	(Sweden) Jonas Björkman	(United States) Todd Martin (United States) Richey Reneberg	6–4, 7–6
Win	7.	Aug 1998	Mercedes-Benz Cup, Los Angeles	Hard	(Australia) Sandon Stolle	(United States) Jeff Tarango (Czech Republic) Daniel Vacek	6–4, 6–4
Win	8.	Feb 1999	Australian Open, Melbourne	Hard	(Sweden) Jonas Björkman	(India) Mahesh Bhupathi (India) Leander Paes	6–3, 4–6, 6–4, 6–7^{(10–12)}, 6–4
Win	9.	Jun 1999	Gerry Weber Open, Germany	Grass	(Sweden) Jonas Björkman	(Netherlands) Paul Haarhuis (United States) Jared Palmer	6–3, 7–5
Win	10.	Aug 1999	Canada Masters, Montréal	Hard	(Sweden) Jonas Björkman	(Zimbabwe) Byron Black (South Africa) Wayne Ferreira	7–6^{(7–5)}, 6–4
Loss	8.	Jun 2001	Gerry Weber Open, Germany	Grass	(Belarus) Max Mirnyi	(Canada) Daniel Nestor (Australia) Sandon Stolle	4–6, 7–6^{(7–5)}, 1–6

== Performance timelines ==
Key
W	F	SF	QF	#R	RR	Q#	DNQ	A	NH

(W) winner; (F) finalist; (SF) semifinalist; (QF) quarterfinalist; (#R) rounds 4, 3, 2, 1; (RR) round-robin stage; (Q#) qualification round; (DNQ) did not qualify; (A) absent; (NH) not held; (SR) strike rate (events won / competed); (W–L) win–loss record.

=== Singles ===
		Professional career												
Tournament	1990	1991	1992	1993	1994	1995	1996	1997	1998	1999	2000	2001	SR	W–L
Grand Slam tournaments
Australian Open	Q2	Q1	1R	1R	3R	4R	2R	1R	3R	3R	A	SF	0 / 9	15–9
French Open	A	A	A	Q3	4R	1R	1R	SF	2R	3R	2R	1R	0 / 8	12–8
Wimbledon	A	A	Q2	3R	2R	1R	4R	4R	4R	SF	F	F	0 / 9	29–9
US Open	A	A	Q1	1R	3R	2R	1R	W	W	1R	1R	4R	2 / 9	20–7
Win–loss	0–0	0–0	0–1	2–3	8–4	4–4	4–4	15–3	13–3	9–4	7–3	14–4	2 / 35	76–33
Year-end championships
Tennis Masters Cup	did not qualify							RR	A	DNQ		RR	0 / 2	2–4
Grand Slam Cup	did not qualify							F	DNQ		not held		0 / 1	3–1
ATP Masters Series
Indian Wells Masters	A	A	A	1R	3R	3R	A	1R	2R	2R	2R	QF	0 / 8	9–8
Miami Masters	A	A	A	Q2	SF	2R	A	1R	1R	3R	4R	SF	0 / 7	13–7
Monte-Carlo Masters	A	A	A	A	A	1R	A	A	A	A	A	A	0 / 1	0–1
Rome Masters	A	A	A	A	1R	1R	A	2R	1R	F	1R	A	0 / 6	6–6
Hamburg Masters	A	A	A	A	A	2R	A	A	A	A	1R	A	0 / 2	1–2
Canada Masters	A	A	A	A	1R	2R	QF	2R	W	QF	QF	F	1 / 8	20–7
Cincinnati Masters	A	A	A	1R	1R	3R	2R	3R	W	F	A	F	1 / 8	19–7
Stuttgart Masters^{1}	A	A	A	A	2R	A	A	SF	2R	A	2R	A	0 / 4	4–4
Paris Masters	A	A	A	A	1R	A	A	2R	2R	A	3R	A	0 / 4	3–4
Win–loss	0–0	0–0	0–0	0–2	8–7	7–7	4–2	7–7	13–5	12–5	7–7	17–4	2 / 48	75–46
Career statistics
Finals	0	0	0	0	2	0	0	7	6	3	3	4	25	
Titles	0	0	0	0	1	0	0	1	6	1	1	1	11	
Overall win–loss	0–0	0–1	0–3	11–11	45–28	32–25	25–20	65–29	60–21	38–16	34–19	48–18	358–191	
Win %	–	0%	0%	50%	62%	56%	56%	69%	74%	70%	64%	73%	65.21%	
Year-end ranking	751	293	243	66	20	66	62	2	4	16	15	7		

^{1} Held as Stockholm Masters until 1994, Stuttgart Masters from 1995 to 2001.

=== Doubles ===
		Professional career											Post-retirement						
Tournament	1990	1991	1992	1993	1994	1995	1996	1997	1998	1999	2000	2001	2002	2003	2004	...	2014	SR	W–L
Grand Slam tournaments
Australian Open	A	A	2R	2R	1R	3R	2R	1R	1R	W	A	A	A	A	1R		1R	1 / 10	10–8
French Open	A	A	A	A	1R	1R	3R	3R	SF	3R	2R	A	A	A	A		A	0 / 7	11–6
Wimbledon	A	A	Q3	Q3	A	QF	SF	QF	SF	QF	A	A	A	A	A		A	0 / 5	17–4
US Open	A	A	A	QF	2R	3R	SF	3R	QF	A	A	A	A	A	A		A	0 / 6	15–6
Win–loss	0–0	0–0	1–1	4–2	1–3	7–4	10–3	7–4	11–4	10–1	1–0	0–0	0–0	0–0	0–1		0–1	1 / 28	53–24
ATP Masters Series
Indian Wells Masters	A	A	A	QF	2R	A	A	F	W	2R	A	QF	A	A	A		A	1 / 6	13–5
Miami Masters	A	A	A	Q2	1R	A	A	A	A	A	A	SF	A	A	A		A	0 / 2	4–1
Monte-Carlo Masters	A	A	A	A	A	1R	A	A	A	A	A	A	A	A	A		A	0 / 1	0–1
Rome Masters	A	A	A	A	1R	1R	A	QF	QF	QF	A	A	A	A	A		A	0 / 5	6–5
Hamburg Masters	A	A	A	A	A	QF	A	A	A	A	SF	A	NH				NH	0 / 2	5–2
Canada Masters	A	A	A	A	2R	SF	2R	QF	SF	W	A	1R	A	A	A		A	1 / 7	14–6
Cincinnati Masters	A	A	A	A	1R	SF	QF	F	2R	A	A	A	A	A	A		A	0 / 5	9–5
Stuttgart Masters^{1}	A	A	A	A	A	A	A	2R	A	A	1R	A	A	A	A		NMS	0 / 2	1–2
Paris Masters	A	A	A	A	A	A	A	QF	A	A	A	A	A	A	A		A	0 / 1	2–1
Win–loss	0–0	0–0	0–0	2–1	2–5	8–5	3–2	15–6	8–3	7–2	3–2	6–2	0–0	0–0	0–0		0–0	2 / 31	54–28
Year-end ranking	664	434	225	64	60	30	30	12	16	19	121	120	–	–	1211		–		

^{1} Held as Stockholm Masters until 1994, Stuttgart Masters from 1995 to 2001.

== Top 10 wins ==
Season	1990	1991	1992	1993	1994	1995	1996	1997	1998	1999	2000	2001	Total
Wins	0	0	0	1	2	0	1	8	7	3	4	9	35

No.	Player	Rank	Event	Surface	Rd.	Score	Rafter Rank
1993
1.	(United States) Pete Sampras	1	Indianapolis, United States	Hard	QF	7–6^{(8–6)}, 6–7^{(3–7)}, 7–6^{(7–5)}	139
1994
2.	(United States) Jim Courier	3	Indian Wells Masters, United States	Hard	2R	7–6^{(7–2)}, 6–2	49
3.	(United States) Michael Chang	8	Miami Open, United States	Hard	4R	6–2, 6–7^{(2–7)}, 6–2	46
1996
4.	(United States) Andre Agassi	3	Washington, D.C., United States	Hard	3R	6–7^{(2–7)}, 6–0, 6–2	61
1997
5.	(Austria) Thomas Muster	5	St. Pölten, Austria	Clay	QF	6–3, 7–6^{(7–0)}	33
6.	(Netherlands) Richard Krajicek	6	French Open, Paris	Clay	3R	6–3, 4–6, 6–4, 6–2	25
7.	(Spain) Sergi Bruguera	7	New Haven, United States	Hard	QF	7–5, 2–6, 6–2	18
8.	(United States) Michael Chang	2	Connecticut Open, United States	Hard	QF	6–4, 3–6, 6–1	14
9.	(United States) Michael Chang	2	US Open, New York	Hard	SF	6–3, 6–3, 6–4	14
10.	(Chile) Marcelo Ríos	7	Grand Slam Cup, Munich	Carpet (i)	QF	6–1, 7–6^{(7–0)}	3
11.	(United Kingdom) Greg Rusedski	5	ATP Tour World Championships, Hanover	Hard (i)	RR	4–6, 6–3, 6–4	3
12.	(Spain) Carlos Moyá	7	ATP Tour World Championships, Hanover	Hard (i)	RR	6–4, 6–2	3
1998
13.	(Sweden) Jonas Björkman	7	Toronto, Canada	Hard	QF	6–3, 6–2	5
14.	(Netherlands) Richard Krajicek	9	Toronto, Canada	Hard	F	7–6^{(7–3)}, 6–4	5
15.	(Czech Republic) Petr Korda	4	Cincinnati Masters, United States	Hard	QF	6–4, 7–6^{(10–8)}	3
16.	(Russia) Yevgeny Kafelnikov	10	Cincinnati Masters, United States	Hard	SF	7–5, 6–0	3
17.	(United States) Pete Sampras	2	Cincinnati Masters, United States	Hard	F	1–6, 7–6^{(7–2)}, 6–4	3
18.	(United Kingdom) Greg Rusedski	6	Long Island, United States	Hard	SF	6–4, 7–5	3
19.	(United States) Pete Sampras	1	US Open, New York	Hard	SF	6–7^{(8–10)}, 6–4, 2–6, 6–4, 6–3	3
1999
20.	(United States) Pete Sampras	2	World Team Cup, Düsseldorf	Clay	RR	6–3, 6–4	3
21.	(United States) Todd Martin	8	Davis Cup, Boston	Hard	RR	4–6, 5–7, 6–3, 6–2, 6–4	2
22.	(Russia) Yevgeny Kafelnikov	2	Cincinnati Masters, United States	Hard	SF	6–4, 6–2	4
2000
23.	(United States) Andre Agassi	1	Wimbledon, United Kingdom	Grass	SF	7–5, 4–6, 7–5, 4–6, 6–3	21
24.	(Brazil) Gustavo Kuerten	4	Davis Cup, Brisbane	Grass	RR	6–3, 6–2, 6–3	14
25.	(Brazil) Gustavo Kuerten	3	Hong Kong	Hard	QF	7–6^{(7–4)}, 6–4	18
26.	(Brazil) Gustavo Kuerten	2	Lyon, France	Carpet (i)	QF	6–3, 6–4	17
2001
27.	(United Kingdom) Tim Henman	10	Australian Open, Melbourne	Hard	4R	6–2, 6–3, 6–3	15
28.	(Spain) Àlex Corretja	7	Indian Wells Masters, United States	Hard	3R	4–6, 6–3, 6–4	11
29.	(Spain) Àlex Corretja	10	Miami Open, United States	Hard	4R	6–4, 6–3	8
30.	(United States) Andre Agassi	2	Wimbledon, United Kingdom	Grass	SF	2–6, 6–3, 3–6, 6–2, 8–6	10
31.	(Spain) Juan Carlos Ferrero	4	Montreal, Canada	Hard	QF	7–5, 4–6, 6–2	9
32.	(Australia) Lleyton Hewitt	5	Cincinnati Masters, United States	Hard	SF	6–4, 6–3	7
33.	(Russia) Marat Safin	3	Indianapolis, United States	Hard	SF	6–3, 5–7, 7–6^{(9–7)}	6
34.	(Brazil) Gustavo Kuerten	1	Indianapolis, United States	Hard	F	4–2 ret.	6
35.	(France) Sébastien Grosjean	6	Davis Cup, Melbourne	Grass	RR	6–3, 7–6^{(8–6)}, 7–5	7

== Career Grand Slam tournament seedings ==
The tournaments won by Rafter are bolded.

=== Singles ===
Legend
seeded No. 1 (0 / 0)
seeded No. 2 (0 / 2)
seeded No. 3 (1 / 4)
seeded No. 4–10 (0 / 5)
Seeded outside the top 10 (1 / 4)
not seeded (0 / 16)
qualifier(0 / 2)
wild card (0 / 1)
lucky loser (0 / 1)
alternate (0 / 0)
special exempt (0 / 0)
protected ranking(0 / 0)

Year	Australian Open	French Open	Wimbledon	US Open
1990	Lost in Qualifying	did not play	did not play	did not play
1991	Lost in Qualifying	did not play	did not play	did not play
1992	qualifier	did not play	Lost in Qualifying	Lost in Qualifying
1993	wild card	Lost in Qualifying	qualifier	lucky loser
1994	not seeded	not seeded	not seeded	not seeded
1995	not seeded	not seeded	not seeded	not seeded
1996	not seeded	not seeded	not seeded	not seeded
1997	not seeded	not seeded	12th	**13th**
1998	2nd	4th	6th	**3rd**
1999	3rd	3rd	2nd	4th
2000	did not play	not seeded	12th	not seeded
2001	12th	8th	3rd	6th

=== Doubles ===
Legend
seeded No. 1 (0 / 0)
seeded No. 2 (0 / 0)
seeded No. 3 (0 / 2)
seeded No. 4–10 (1 / 8)
Seeded outside the top 10 (0 / 5)
not seeded (0 / 9)
qualifier(0 / 0)
wild card (0 / 4)
lucky loser (0 / 0)
alternate (0 / 0)
special exempt (0 / 0)
protected ranking(0 / 0)

Year	Australian Open	French Open	Wimbledon	US Open
1990				
1991				
1992	wild card			
1993	wild card			not seeded
1994	not seeded	not seeded		not seeded
1995	not seeded	not seeded	not seeded	16th
1996	16th	15th	11th	13th
1997	not seeded	10th	7th	5th
1998	9th	6th	5th	3rd
1999	**5th**	5th	3rd	
2000		not seeded		
2001				
2002				
2003				
2004	wild card			
2005				
2006				
2007				
2008				
2009				
2010				
2011				
2012				
2013				
2014	wild card			

== Summer Olympics matches ==
=== Singles ===
2000 Summer Olympics
Round	Opponent	Result	Score
1R	(United States) Vincent Spadea	Win	6–4, 6–3
2R	(Canada) Daniel Nestor	Loss	5–7, 6–7^{(4–7)}

== ATP Tour career earnings ==
This list is incomplete; you can help by expanding it.

Year	Majors	ATP titles	Total titles	Earnings ($)	Money list rank
1991					
1992					
1993					
1994					
1995					
1996					
1997					
1998					
1999					
2000					
2001					
Career					
