= 1982 Wailea Pro Tennis Classic =

- Date: September 27 – October 3
- Edition: 9th
- Category: Grand Prix
- Draw: 32S / 16D
- Prize money: $100,000
- Surface: Hard / outdoor
- Location: Maui, Hawaii, U.S.

Champions

Singles
- (Australia) John Fitzgerald

Doubles
- (United States) Eliot Teltscher / (United States) Mike Cahill
← 1981 ·	Hawaii Open	· 1983 →

The 1982 Wailea Pro Tennis Classic, also known as the Hawaii Open, was a men's tennis tournament played an outdoor hard courts in Maui, Hawaii, in the United States that was part of the 1982 Volvo Grand Prix circuit. It was the ninth edition of the tournament and was held from September 27 through October 3, 1982. Unseeded John Fitzgerald won the singles title.

== Finals ==
=== Singles ===
(Australia) John Fitzgerald defeated (United States) Brian Teacher 6–2, 6–3

- It was Fitzgerald's 1st singles title of the year and the 2nd of his career.

=== Doubles ===
(United States) Eliot Teltscher / (United States) Mike Cahill defeated (Paraguay) Francisco González / (South Africa) Bernard Mitton 6–4, 6–4
