= 1995 Internazionali di Carisbo – Singles =

Singles
- 1995 Internazionali di Carisbo

Final
- Champion: (Chile) Marcelo Ríos
- Runner-up: (Uruguay) Marcelo Filippini
- Score: 6–2, 6–4

Details
- Draw: 32 (3WC/4Q/1LL)
- Seeds: 8

Events
Singles	Doubles
← 1994 ·	Bologna Outdoor	· 1996 →

Javier Sánchez was the defending champion, but lost in the semifinals to Marcelo Filippini.

Marcelo Ríos won the title by defeating Filippini 6–2, 6–4 in the final.

== Seeds ==
1. (Austria) Gilbert Schaller (quarterfinals)
2. (Australia) Richard Fromberg (first round)
3. (Spain) Francisco Clavet (first round)
4. (Spain) Javier Sánchez (semifinals)
5. (France) Arnaud Boetsch (second round)
6. (United States) Vince Spadea (first round)
7. (Czech Republic) Sláva Doseděl (quarterfinals)
8. (Italy) Renzo Furlan (second round)

== Draw ==
=== Key ===
- Q = Qualifier
- WC = Wild card
- LL = Lucky loser
- Alt = Alternate
- ITF = ITF entry
- PR = Protected ranking
- SR = Special ranking
- SE = Special exempt
- JE = Junior exempt
- JR = Junior Accelerator Programme entrant
- CO = College Accelerator Programme entrant
- NG = Next Gen Accelerator Program entrant
- w/o = Walkover
- r = Retired
- d = Defaulted

=== Finals ===
Semifinals
(Chile) Marcelo Ríos	6	7^{8}
WC	(Australia) Mark Philippoussis	4	6^{6}
4	(Spain) Javier Sánchez	6^{5}	6	4
(Uruguay) Marcelo Filippini	7^{7}	2	6

Final
(Chile) Marcelo Ríos	6	6
(Uruguay) Marcelo Filippini	2	4

=== Top half ===
First round
1	(Austria) G Schaller	6	6
(Italy) C Caratti	3	3
(United Kingdom) J Bates	0	6	5
(Sweden) M Wilander	6	3	7
(Chile) M Ríos	5	6	6
(Zimbabwe) B Black	7	3	0
(Norway) C Ruud	4	4
8	(Italy) R Furlan	6	6
3	(Spain) F Clavet	4	2
WC	(Australia) M Philippoussis	6	6
Q	(Ecuador) L Morejón	7	4	1
(Spain) T Carbonell	5	6	6
WC	(Italy) O Camporese	3	6	1
Q	(Morocco) K Alami	6	3	6
(United States) J Tarango	3	3
5/Q	(France) A Boetsch	6	6

Second round
1	(Austria) G Schaller	6	6
(Sweden) M Wilander	4	1
(Chile) M Ríos	6	7^{8}
8	(Italy) R Furlan	4	6^{6}
WC	(Australia) M Philippoussis	6	7^{7}
(Spain) T Carbonell	4	6^{1}
Q	(Morocco) K Alami	6	7
5/Q	(France) A Boetsch	4	5

Quarterfinals
1	(Austria) G Schaller	1	6	2
(Chile) M Ríos	6	3	6
WC	(Australia) M Philippoussis	7^{11}	3	6
Q	(Morocco) K Alami	6^{9}	6	2

Semifinals
(Chile) M Ríos	6	7^{8}
WC	(Australia) M Philippoussis	4	6^{6}

=== Bottom half ===
First round
6	(United States) V Spadea	6	4	5
LL	(Italy) M Calvelli	2	6	7
WC	(Italy) P Canè	0	1
(Spain) J Burillo	6	6
(Sweden) A Järryd	4	7^{7}	5
(Denmark) K Carlsen	6	6^{4}	7
(Germany) CU Steeb	3	3
4	(Spain) J Sánchez	6	6
7	(Czech Republic) S Doseděl	6	6
(Spain) A Mancisidor	2	1
(Spain) Ó Martínez	0	1
Q	(Italy) P Pennisi	6	6
(United States) B Shelton	1	6^{4}
(United States) J Stark	6	7^{7}
(Uruguay) M Filippini	7^{8}	6
2	(Australia) R Fromberg	6^{6}	4

Second round
LL	(Italy) M Calvelli	2	7^{7}	3
(Spain) J Burillo	6	6^{5}	6
(Denmark) K Carlsen	3	2
4	(Spain) J Sánchez	6	6
7	(Czech Republic) S Doseděl	6	6
Q	(Italy) P Pennisi	0	2
(United States) J Stark	5	3
(Uruguay) M Filippini	7	6

Quarterfinals
(Spain) J Burillo	4	3
4	(Spain) J Sánchez	6	6
7	(Czech Republic) S Doseděl	1	3
(Uruguay) M Filippini	6	6

Semifinals
4	(Spain) J Sánchez	6^{5}	6	4
(Uruguay) M Filippini	7^{7}	2	6
