= 1995 Salem Open =

- Date: 17–23 April
- Edition: 20th
- Category: World Series
- Draw: 32S / 16D
- Prize money: $303,000
- Surface: Hard / outdoor
- Location: Hong Kong, Hong Kong

Champions

Singles
- (United States) Michael Chang

Doubles
- (United States) Tommy Ho / (Australia) Mark Philippoussis
← 1994 ·	Hong Kong Open	· 1996 →

The 1995 Salem Open was a men's tennis tournament played on outdoor hard courts on Hong Kong Island in Hong Kong that was part of the World Series of the 1995 ATP Tour. It was the 20th edition of the tournament and was held from 17 April through 23 April 1995. First-seeded Michael Chang won his second consecutive singles title at the event.

== Finals ==
=== Singles ===
(United States) Michael Chang defeated (Sweden) Jonas Björkman 6–3, 6–1

- It was Chang's 1st singles title of the year and the 20th of his career.

=== Doubles ===
(United States) Tommy Ho / (Australia) Mark Philippoussis defeated (Australia) John Fitzgerald / (Sweden) Anders Järryd 6–1, 6–7^{(2–7)}, 7–6^{(7–3)}

- It was Ho's 2nd doubles title of the year and the 3rd of his career. It was Philippoussis' 1st doubles title of his career.
