= 1984 Seiko Super Tennis Hawaii =

- Date: September 24–30
- Edition: 11th
- Category: Grand Prix
- Draw: 32S / 16D
- Prize money: $100,000
- Surface: Carpet / indoor
- Location: Honolulu, Hawaii, U.S.
- Venue: Blaisdell Arena

Champions

Singles
- (United States) Marty Davis

Doubles
- (United States) Gary Donnelly / (United States) Butch Walts
← 1983 ·	Hawaii Open

The 1984 Seiko Super Tennis Hawaii, also known as the Hawaii Open, was a men's tennis tournament played an indoor carpet courts at the Blaisdell Arena in Honolulu, Hawaii, in the United States that was part of the 1984 Volvo Grand Prix circuit. It was the 11th and last edition of the tournament and was held from September 24 through September 30, 1984. Unseeded Marty Davis won the singles title and earned $20,000 first-prize money as well as 100 Grand Prix ranking points which elevated his ATP ranking from 80th to the mid-50s.

== Finals ==
=== Singles ===
(United States) Marty Davis defeated (United States) David Pate 6–1, 6–2

- It was Davis' 1st singles title of the year and the 2nd of his career.

=== Doubles ===
(United States) Gary Donnelly / (United States) Butch Walts defeated (United States) Mark Dickson / (United States) Mike Leach 7–6, 6–4
