= 1984 Seiko Super Tennis Hawaii – Singles =

Singles
- 1984 Seiko Super Tennis Hawaii

Final
- Champion: (United States) Marty Davis
- Runner-up: (United States) David Pate
- Score: 6–1, 6–2

Details
- Draw: 32 (2WC/4Q/1LL)
- Seeds: 8

Events
Singles	Doubles
- Hawaii Open

Scott Davis was the defending champion, but did not compete this year.

Marty Davis won the title by defeating David Pate 6–1, 6–2 in the final.

== Seeds ==
1. (n/a)
2. (United States) John Sadri (semifinals)
3. (United States) Brad Gilbert (quarterfinals)
4. (United States) Leif Shiras (first round)
5. (Nigeria) Nduka Odizor (first round)
6. (United States) Mark Dickson (quarterfinals)
7. (South Africa) Danie Visser (first round)
8. (United States) Sammy Giammalva Jr. (quarterfinals)

== Draw ==
Key

- Q = Qualifier
- WC = Wild card
- LL = Lucky loser
- Alt = Alternate
- ITF = ITF entry
- PR = Protected ranking
- SR = Special ranking
- SE = Special exempt
- JE = Junior exempt
- JR = Junior Accelerator Programme entrant
- CO = College Accelerator Programme entrant
- NG = Next Gen Accelerator Program entrant
- w/o = Walkover
- r = Retired
- d = Defaulted

=== Finals ===
Semifinals
(United States) Marty Davis	7	6
(United States) Greg Holmes	6	2
(United States) David Pate	7	7
2	(United States) John Sadri	5	6

Final
(United States) Marty Davis	6	6
(United States) David Pate	1	2

=== Top half ===
First round
LL	(South Africa) B Moir	6	7	6
WC	(United States) D Cassidy	7	6	7
(United States) M Leach	2	7	6
(United States) P Annacone	6	6	7
(United States) D Dowlen	3	4
(United States) M Davis	6	6
(Australia) J Alexander	7	6
5	(Nigeria) N Odizor	6	1
4	(United States) L Shiras	6	3	4
(United States) V Winitsky	3	6	6
Q	(New Zealand) S Guy	3	4
(United States) G Holmes	6	6
Q	(United States) C Stansbury	6	6	6
(Canada) G Michibata	4	7	3
(United States) M Mitchell	2	2
8	(United States) S Giammalva Jr.	6	6

Second round
WC	(United States) D Cassidy	6	6
(United States) P Annacone	7	7
(United States) M Davis	6	5	6
(Australia) J Alexander	2	7	4
(United States) V Winitsky	6	3
(United States) G Holmes	7	6
Q	(United States) C Stansbury	2	4
8	(United States) S Giammalva Jr.	6	6

Quarterfinals
(United States) P Annacone	3	5
(United States) M Davis	6	7
(United States) G Holmes	6	6
8	(United States) S Giammalva Jr.	3	4

Semifinals
(United States) M Davis	7	6
(United States) G Holmes	6	2

=== Bottom half ===
First round
7	(South Africa) D Visser	6	4
(United States) D Pate	7	6
WC	(Japan) J Kamiwazumi	3	2
(Paraguay) F González	6	6
(United States) E Korita	7	6
Q	(United States) R Nixon	6	4
(United States) L Bourne	6	4
3	(United States) B Gilbert	7	6
6	(United States) M Dickson	6	6	7
Q	(United States) Kevin Belcher	4	7	5
(United States) S Meister	3	4
(United States) C Hooper	6	6
(United States) L Stefanki	4	6	4
(United States) T Giammalva	6	4	6
(United States) B Manson	3	4
2	(United States) J Sadri	6	6

Second round
(United States) D Pate	6	6
(Paraguay) F González	4	3
(United States) E Korita	1	1
3	(United States) B Gilbert	6	6
6	(United States) M Dickson	7	4	7
(United States) C Hooper	6	6	6
(United States) T Giammalva	3	6	3
2	(United States) J Sadri	6	3	6

Quarterfinals
(United States) D Pate	6	6
3	(United States) B Gilbert	3	4
6	(United States) M Dickson	1	5
2	(United States) J Sadri	6	7

Semifinals
(United States) D Pate	7	7
2	(United States) J Sadri	5	6
