= 1983 Seiko Super Tennis Wailea =

- Date: September 26 – October 2
- Edition: 10th
- Category: Grand Prix
- Draw: 32S / 16D
- Prize money: $100,000
- Surface: Hard / outdoor
- Location: Maui, Hawaii, U.S.

Champions

Singles
- (United States) Scott Davis

Doubles
- (United States) Steve Meister / (United States) Tony Giammalva
← 1982 ·	Hawaii Open	· 1984 →

The 1983 Seiko Super Tennis Wailea, also known as the Hawaii Open, was a men's tennis tournament played an outdoor hard courts in Maui, Hawaii, in the United States that was part of the 1983 Volvo Grand Prix circuit. It was the tenth edition of the tournament and was held from September 26 through October 2, 1983. Third-seeded Scott Davis won the singles title.

== Finals ==
=== Singles ===
(United States) Scott Davis defeated (United States) Vince Van Patten 6–3, 6–7, 7–6.

- It was Davis's first singles title of his career.

=== Doubles ===
(United States) Steve Meister / (United States) Tony Giammalva defeated (United States) Mike Bauer / (United States) Scott Davis 6–3, 5–7, 6–4

== See also ==
- 1983 Ginny Championships – women's tournament
