= 1995 Internazionali di Carisbo =

ATP tennis tournament in Bologna

- Date: 22–28 May
- Edition: 11th
- Category: World Series
- Draw: 32S / 16D
- Prize money: $303,000
- Surface: Clay / outdoor
- Location: Bologna, Italy
- Venue: Cierrebi Club

Champions

Singles
- (Chile) Marcelo Ríos

Doubles
- (Zimbabwe) Byron Black / (United States) Jonathan Stark
← 1994 ·	Bologna Outdoor	· 1996 →

The 1995 Internazionali di Carisbo was a men's tennis tournament played on outdoor clay courts at the Cierrebi Club in Bologna in Italy and was part of the World Series of the 1995 ATP Tour. It was the 11th edition of the tournament and was held from 22 May through 28 May 1995. Unseeded Marcelo Ríos won the singles title.

== Finals ==
=== Singles ===
(Chile) Marcelo Ríos defeated (Uruguay) Marcelo Filippini 6–2, 6–4

- It was Ríos' 1st singles title of his career.

=== Doubles ===
(Zimbabwe) Byron Black / (United States) Jonathan Stark defeated (Belgium) Libor Pimek / (United States) Vincent Spadea 7–5, 6–3

- It was Black's 1st doubles title of the year and the 10th of his career. It was Stark's 3rd doubles title of the year and the 14th of his career.
