= 1977 Island Holidays Classic =

- Date: October 3–9
- Edition: 4th
- Category: Grand Prix (3 star)
- Draw: 32S / 16D
- Prize money: $100,000
- Surface: Hard court / outdoor
- Location: Maui, Hawaii, U.S.

Champions

Singles
- (United States) Jimmy Connors

Doubles
- (United States) Stan Smith / (United States) Bob Lutz
| ← 1976 · | Hawaii Open | · 1978 → |

The 1977 Island Holidays Classic, also known as the Hawaii Open, was a men's tennis tournament played an outdoor hard courts in Maui, Hawaii, in the United States that was part of the 1977 Colgate-Palmolive Grand Prix circuit and categorized as 3 star event. It was the fourth edition of the tournament and was held from October 3 through October 9, 1977. First-seeded Jimmy Connors won the singles title, his second at the event after 1975.

== Finals ==
=== Singles ===
(United States) Jimmy Connors defeated (United States) Brian Gottfried 6–2, 6–0

- It was Connors's 5th singles title of the year and the 58th of his career.

=== Doubles ===
(United States) Stan Smith / (United States) Bob Lutz defeated (United States) Brian Gottfried / (Mexico) Raúl Ramírez 7–6, 6–4
