= 1995 Internazionali di Carisbo – Doubles =

Doubles
- 1995 Internazionali di Carisbo

Final
- Champions: (Zimbabwe) Byron Black (United States) Jonathan Stark
- Runners-up: (Belgium) Libor Pimek (United States) Vince Spadea
- Score: 7–5, 6–3

Details
- Draw: 16 (3WC/1Q)
- Seeds: 4

Events
Singles	Doubles
← 1994 ·	Bologna Outdoor	· 1996 →

John Fitzgerald and Patrick Rafter were the defending champions, but Rafter chose to compete at the World Team Cup, which was held at Düsseldorf the same week. Fitzgerald teamed up with Anders Järryd and were forced to retire in their first round match against Mark Keil and Peter Nyborg.

Byron Black and Jonathan Stark won the title by defeating Libor Pimek and Vince Spadea 7–5, 6–3 in the final.

== Seeds ==
1. (Zimbabwe) Byron Black / (United States) Jonathan Stark (champions)
2. (South Africa) David Adams / (Netherlands) Menno Oosting (quarterfinals)
3. (Australia) John Fitzgerald / (Sweden) Anders Järryd (first round, retired)
4. (Australia) Wayne Arthurs / (Spain) Tomás Carbonell (quarterfinals)

== Draw ==
=== Key ===
- Q = Qualifier
- WC = Wild card
- LL = Lucky loser
- Alt = Alternate
- ITF = ITF entry
- PR = Protected ranking
- SR = Special ranking
- SE = Special exempt
- JE = Junior exempt
- JR = Junior Accelerator Programme entrant
- CO = College Accelerator Programme entrant
- NG = Next Gen Accelerator Program entrant
- w/o = Walkover
- r = Retired
- d = Defaulted

=== Draw ===
First round
1	(Zimbabwe) B Black (United States) J Stark	7	6
(United States) L Jensen (United States) M Jensen	6	4
(South Africa) E Ferreira (South Africa) D Visser	7	6	4
WC	(Italy) P Canè (Chile) M Ríos	6	7	6
3	(Australia) J Fitzgerald (Sweden) A Järryd	0^{r}
(United States) M Keil (Sweden) P Nyborg	3
(Czech Republic) V Flégl (Australia) A Florent	7	7
WC	(Australia) R Fromberg (Australia) M Philippoussis	6	5
(Netherlands) S Noteboom (United States) J Tarango	3	3
Q	(Belgium) L Pimek (United States) V Spadea	6	6
(Italy) C Brandi (Argentina) L Lobo	3	2
4	(Australia) W Arthurs (Spain) T Carbonell	6	6
(Australia) D Macpherson (United States) B Shelton	3	4
(United Kingdom) N Broad (South Africa) B Haygarth	6	6
WC	(Italy) O Camporese (Italy) F Mordegan	6	2	5
2	(South Africa) D Adams (Netherlands) M Oosting	4	6	7

Quarterfinals
1	(Zimbabwe) B Black (United States) J Stark	6	7
WC	(Italy) P Canè (Chile) M Ríos	3	6
(United States) M Keil (Sweden) P Nyborg	7	6	3
(Czech Republic) V Flégl (Australia) A Florent	5	7	6
Q	(Belgium) L Pimek (United States) V Spadea	6	6
4	(Australia) W Arthurs (Spain) T Carbonell	2	3
(United Kingdom) N Broad (South Africa) B Haygarth	6	7
2	(South Africa) D Adams (Netherlands) M Oosting	4	6

Semifinals
1	(Zimbabwe) B Black (United States) J Stark	6	6	6
(Czech Republic) V Flégl (Australia) A Florent	7	3	2
Q	(Belgium) L Pimek (United States) V Spadea	7	5	7
(United Kingdom) N Broad (South Africa) B Haygarth	6	7	5

Final
1	(Zimbabwe) B Black (United States) J Stark	7	6
Q	(Belgium) L Pimek (United States) V Spadea	5	3
