= 1978 Island Holidays Classic =

- Date: October 2–8
- Edition: 5th
- Category: Grand Prix
- Draw: 32S / 16D
- Prize money: $100,000
- Surface: Hard court / outdoor
- Location: Maui, Hawaii, U.S.

Champions

Singles
- (United States) Bill Scanlon

Doubles
- (United States) Tom Gullikson / (United States) Tim Gullikson
← 1977 ·	Hawaii Open	· 1979 →

The 1978 Island Holidays Classic, also known as the Hawaii Open, was a men's tennis tournament played an outdoor hard courts in Maui, Hawaii, in the United States that was part of the 1978 Colgate-Palmolive Grand Prix circuit. It was the fifth edition of the tournament and was held from October 2 through October 8, 1978. Unseeded Bill Scanlon won the singles title.

== Finals ==
=== Singles ===
(United States) Bill Scanlon defeated (United States) Peter Fleming 6–2, 6–0

- It was Scanlon's first singles title of his career.

=== Doubles ===
(United States) Tom Gullikson / (United States) Tim Gullikson defeated (United States) Peter Fleming / (United States) John McEnroe 7–6, 7–6
