= 1976 Island Holidays Classic =

- Date: October 4–10
- Edition: 3rd
- Category: Grand Prix (3 star)
- Draw: 48S / 24D
- Prize money: $100,000
- Surface: Hard court / outdoor
- Location: Maui, Hawaii, U.S.

Champions

Singles
- (United States) Harold Solomon

Doubles
- (South Africa) Raymond Moore / (Australia) Allan Stone
← 1975 ·	Hawaii Open	· 1977 →

The 1976 Island Holidays Classic, also known as the Hawaii Open, was a men's tennis tournament played on outdoor hard courts in Maui, Hawaii, in the United States. It was the third edition of the tournament and was held from October 4 through October 10, 1976. The tournament was part of the Grand Prix tennis circuit and was categorized as a 3 star event. Unseeded Harold Solomon won the singles title.

== Finals ==
=== Singles ===
(United States) Harold Solomon defeated (United States) Bob Lutz 6–3, 5–7, 7–5

- It was Solomon's 4th singles title of the year and the 9th of his career.

=== Doubles ===
(South Africa) Raymond Moore / (Australia) Allan Stone defeated (United States) Dick Stockton / (United States) Roscoe Tanner 6–7, 6–3, 6–4
