= 1980 Island Holidays Classic =

- Date: September 29 – October 5
- Edition: 7th
- Category: Grand Prix
- Draw: 32S / 16D
- Prize money: $100,000
- Surface: Hard / outdoor
- Location: Maui, Hawaii, U.S.

Champions

Singles
- (United States) Eliot Teltscher

Doubles
- (United States) John McEnroe / (United States) Peter Fleming
← 1979 ·	Hawaii Open	· 1981 →

The 1980 Island Holidays Classic, also known as the Hawaii Open, was a men's tennis tournament played an outdoor hard courts in Maui, Hawaii, in the United States that was part of the 1980 Volvo Grand Prix circuit. It was the seventh edition of the tournament and was held from September 29 through October 5, 1980. Fourth-seeded Eliot Teltscher won the singles title.

== Finals ==
=== Singles ===
(United States) Eliot Teltscher defeated (United States) Tim Wilkison 7–6, 6–3

- It was Teltscher's 2nd singles title of the year and the 4th of his career.

=== Doubles ===
(United States) John McEnroe / (United States) Peter Fleming defeated (United States) Victor Amaya / (United States) Hank Pfister 7–6, 6–7, 6–2
