= 1981 Maui Pro Tennis Classic =

- Date: September 29 – October 4
- Edition: 8th
- Category: Grand Prix
- Draw: 32S / 16D
- Prize money: $50,000
- Surface: Hard / outdoor
- Location: Maui, Hawaii, U.S.

Champions

Singles
- (United States) Hank Pfister

Doubles
- (United States) Matt Mitchell / (United States) Tony Graham
← 1980 ·	Hawaii Open	· 1982 →

The 1981 Maui Pro Tennis Classic, also known as the Hawaii Open, was a men's tennis tournament played an outdoor hard courts in Maui, Hawaii, in the United States that was part of the 1981 Volvo Grand Prix circuit. It was the eighth edition of the tournament and was held from September 29 through October 4, 1981. Unseeded Hank Pfister won the singles title.

== Finals ==
=== Singles ===
(United States) Hank Pfister defeated (United States) Tim Mayotte 6–4, 6–4

- It was Pfister's first singles title of his career.

=== Doubles ===
(United States) Matt Mitchell / (United States) Tony Graham defeated (Australia) John Alexander / (United States) James Delaney 6–3, 3–6, 7–6
