= 1995 Salem Open – Singles =

Singles
- 1995 Salem Open

Final
- Champion: (United States) Michael Chang
- Runner-up: (Sweden) Jonas Björkman
- Score: 6–3, 6–1

Details
- Draw: 32 (3WC/4Q)
- Seeds: 8

Events
Singles	Doubles
← 1994 ·	Hong Kong Open	· 1996 →

Michael Chang successfully defended his title by defeating Jonas Björkman 6–3, 6–1 in the final.

== Seeds ==
1. (United States) Michael Chang (champion)
2. (South Africa) Wayne Ferreira (quarterfinals)
3. (United States) Jim Courier (semifinals)
4. (Sweden) Thomas Enqvist (quarterfinals)
5. (Sweden) Jonas Björkman (final)
6. (Russia) Alexander Volkov (quarterfinals)
7. (Netherlands) Jan Siemerink (second round)
8. (Czech Republic) Martin Damm (second round)

== Draw ==
=== Key ===
- Q = Qualifier
- WC = Wild card
- LL = Lucky loser
- Alt = Alternate
- SE = Special exempt
- PR = Protected ranking
- ITF = ITF entry
- JE = Junior exempt
- w/o = Walkover
- r = Retired
- d = Defaulted
- SR = Special ranking

=== Finals ===
Semifinals
1	(United States) Michael Chang	6	6
3	(United States) Jim Courier	4	2
5	(Sweden) Jonas Björkman	6	6
(Sweden) Jan Apell	1	4

Final
1	(United States) Michael Chang	6	6
5	(Sweden) Jonas Björkman	3	1

=== Top half ===
First round
1	(United States) M Chang	6	6
(Switzerland) J Hlasek	1	3
(Germany) J Renzenbrink	1	3
Q	(Romania) A Rădulescu	6	6
(Denmark) K Carlsen	6	7
(United States) J Grabb	4	5
Q	(Australia) W Masur	4	4
7	(Netherlands) J Siemerink	6	6
3	(United States) J Courier	6	6
WC	(South Korea) Y-i Yoon	2	4
(Sweden) H Holm	3	4
(United States) J Stark	6	6
WC	(United States) T Ho	6	3	7^{7}
WC	(Australia) M Philippoussis	3	6	6^{5}
Q	(Israel) O Sela	3	3
6	(Russia) A Volkov	6	6

Second round
1	(United States) M Chang	5	6	6
Q	(Romania) A Rădulescu	7	3	1
(Denmark) K Carlsen	6	2	7^{7}
7	(Netherlands) J Siemerink	4	6	6^{4}
3	(United States) J Courier	7	6
(United States) J Stark	5	1
WC	(United States) T Ho	7	5	4
6	(Russia) A Volkov	5	7	6

Quarterfinals
1	(United States) M Chang	6	6
(Denmark) K Carlsen	3	2
3	(United States) J Courier	5	6	6
6	(Russia) A Volkov	7	2	3

Semifinals
1	(United States) M Chang	6	6
3	(United States) J Courier	4	2

=== Bottom half ===
First round
5	(Sweden) J Björkman	7^{7}	1	7^{7}
(South Africa) M Ondruska	6^{3}	6	6^{3}
(Sweden) A Järryd	4	6^{3}
(Canada) G Rusedski	6	7^{7}
(Canada) S Lareau	5	6	4
(Germany) D Prinosil	7	1	6
Q	(Mexico) L Herrera	1	1
4	(Sweden) T Enqvist	6	6
8	(Czech Republic) M Damm	7^{7}	7^{12}
(Germany) A Mronz	6^{3}	6^{10}
(Germany) L Rehmann	4	2
(Sweden) J Apell	6	6
(Germany) M Zoecke	6^{5}	3
(United States) J Tarango	7^{7}	6
(United Kingdom) J Bates	5	4
2	(South Africa) W Ferreira	7	6

Second round
5	(Sweden) J Björkman	7	6
(Canada) G Rusedski	5	4
(Germany) D Prinosil	7^{7}	1	4
4	(Sweden) T Enqvist	6^{5}	6	6
8	(Czech Republic) M Damm	7^{7}	3	3
(Sweden) J Apell	6^{1}	6	6
(United States) J Tarango	4	3
2	(South Africa) W Ferreira	6	6

Quarterfinals
5	(Sweden) J Björkman	6	6
4	(Sweden) T Enqvist	4	4
(Sweden) J Apell	3	7^{7}	7^{9}
2	(South Africa) W Ferreira	6	6^{5}	6^{7}

Semifinals
5	(Sweden) J Björkman	6	6
(Sweden) J Apell	1	4
