= 1984 Seiko Super Tennis Hawaii – Doubles =

Doubles
- 1984 Seiko Super Tennis Hawaii

Final
- Champions: (United States) Gary Donnelly (United States) Butch Walts
- Runners-up: (United States) Mark Dickson (United States) Mike Leach
- Score: 7–6, 6–4

Details
- Draw: 16
- Seeds: 4

Events
Singles	Doubles
- Hawaii Open

Tony Giammalva and Steve Meister were the defending champions, but lost in the quarterfinals to Gary Donnelly and Butch Walts.

Donnelly and Walts won the title by defeating Mark Dickson and Mike Leach 7–6, 6–4 in the final.

== Seeds ==
1. (Paraguay) Francisco González / (United States) Matt Mitchell (first round)
2. (United States) Gary Donnelly / (United States) Butch Walts (champions)
3. (United States) David Dowlen / (Nigeria) Nduka Odizor (quarterfinals)
4. (United States) Marty Davis / (United States) Chris Dunk (semifinals)

== Draw ==
Key

- Q = Qualifier
- WC = Wild card
- LL = Lucky loser
- Alt = Alternate
- ITF = ITF entry
- PR = Protected ranking
- SR = Special ranking
- SE = Special exempt
- JE = Junior exempt
- JR = Junior Accelerator Programme entrant
- CO = College Accelerator Programme entrant
- NG = Next Gen Accelerator Program entrant
- w/o = Walkover
- r = Retired
- d = Defaulted

=== Draw ===
First round
1	(Paraguay) F González (United States) M Mitchell	3	4
(United States) G Holmes (United States) L Shiras	6	6
(United States) B Manson (United States) D Pate	4	6	4
(United States) M Dickson (United States) M Leach	6	3	6
4	(United States) M Davis (United States) C Dunk	3	6	6
(United States) D Cassidy (Canada) G Michibata	6	3	4
(United States) P Rennert (South Africa) D Visser	1	6	3
(United States) M de Palmer (United States) S Giammalva Jr.	6	4	6
(United States) P Annacone (United States) E Korita	7	5	5
(United States) B Gilbert (United States) C Hooper	5	7	7
(United States) Mike Fedderly (United States) K Richter	3	3
3	(United States) D Dowlen (Nigeria) N Odizor	6	6
(South Africa) B Moir (United States) R Nixon	2	6
(United States) T Giammalva (United States) S Meister	6	7
(United States) L Stefanki (United States) V Winitsky	3	6
2	(United States) G Donnelly (United States) B Walts	6	7

Quarterfinals
(United States) G Holmes (United States) L Shiras	6	6
(United States) M Dickson (United States) M Leach	7	7
4	(United States) M Davis (United States) C Dunk	6	3	6
(United States) M de Palmer (United States) S Giammalva Jr.	3	6	4
(United States) B Gilbert (United States) C Hooper	2	6	7
3	(United States) D Dowlen (Nigeria) N Odizor	6	4	6
(United States) T Giammalva (United States) S Meister	4	3
2	(United States) G Donnelly (United States) B Walts	6	6

Semifinals
(United States) M Dickson (United States) M Leach	6	4	6
4	(United States) M Davis (United States) C Dunk	3	6	3
(United States) B Gilbert (United States) C Hooper	5	4
2	(United States) G Donnelly (United States) B Walts	7	6

Final
(United States) M Dickson (United States) M Leach	6	4
2	(United States) G Donnelly (United States) B Walts	7	6
