= 1996 Salem Open – Doubles =

Doubles
- 1996 Salem Open
- 1995 Champions: (United States) Tommy Ho (Australia) Mark Philippoussis

Final
- Champions: (United States) Patrick Galbraith (Russia) Andrei Olhovskiy
- Runners-up: (United States) Kent Kinnear (United States) Dave Randall
- Score: 6–3, 6–7, 7–6

Details
- Draw: 16
- Seeds: 4

Events
Singles	Doubles
← 1995 ·	Hong Kong Open	· 1997 →

Tommy Ho and Mark Philippoussis were the defending champions but did not compete that year.

Patrick Galbraith and Andrei Olhovskiy won in the final 6–3, 6–7, 7–6 against Kent Kinnear and Dave Randall.

== Seeds ==
Champion seeds are indicated in bold text while text in italics indicates the round in which those seeds were eliminated.

1. (Australia) Todd Woodbridge / (Australia) Mark Woodforde (quarterfinals)
2. (United States) **Patrick Galbraith** / (Russia) **Andrei Olhovskiy (champions)**
3. (United States) Rick Leach / (United States) Scott Melville (first round)
4. (Czech Republic) Martin Damm / (Sweden) Peter Nyborg (semifinals)

== Draw ==
=== Key ===
- Q = Qualifier
- WC = Wild card
- LL = Lucky loser
- Alt = Alternate
- SE = Special exempt
- PR = Protected ranking
- ITF = ITF entry
- JE = Junior exempt
- w/o = Walkover
- r = Retired
- d = Defaulted
- SR = Special ranking

First round
1	(Australia) **T Woodbridge** (Australia) **M Woodforde**	**6**	**6**
Q	(Hong Kong) D Ling (Hong Kong) R Young	1	0
(South Africa) M Ondruska (United States) J Waite	6	2	r
(United States) **K Kinnear** (United States) **D Randall**	**7**	**5**
3	(United States) R Leach (United States) S Melville	**6**	6	2
(Australia) **J Eagle** (Australia) **M Tebbutt**	3	**7**	**6**
(Australia) **W Arthurs** (United Kingdom) **G Rusedski**	**6**	**7**
WC	(United States) C Chang (United States) M Chang	3	6
WC	(Australia) G Foster (Hong Kong) S So	3	0
(Netherlands) **R Krajicek** (Netherlands) **J Siemerink**	**6**	**6**
WC	(Germany) H Dreekmann (Germany) C-U Steeb	3	3
4	(Czech Republic) **M Damm** (Sweden) **P Nyborg**	**6**	**6**
(Denmark) **K Carlsen** (Sweden) **T Johansson**	2	**6**	**6**
(Germany) D Prinosil (Germany) J Renzenbrink	**6**	1	3
(The Bahamas) M Knowles (The Bahamas) R Smith	**6**	3	4
2	(United States) **P Galbraith** (Russia) **A Olhovskiy**	4	**6**	**6**

Quarterfinals
1	(Australia) T Woodbridge (Australia) M Woodforde	3	3
(United States) **K Kinnear** (United States) **D Randall**	**6**	**6**
(Australia) **J Eagle** (Australia) **M Tebbutt**	**6**	6	**7**
(Australia) W Arthurs (United Kingdom) G Rusedski	4	**7**	6
(Netherlands) R Krajicek (Netherlands) J Siemerink	4	6
4	(Czech Republic) **M Damm** (Sweden) **P Nyborg**	**6**	**7**
(Denmark) K Carlsen (Sweden) T Johansson	5	3
2	(United States) **P Galbraith** (Russia) **A Olhovskiy**	**7**	**6**

Semifinals
(United States) **K Kinnear** (United States) **D Randall**	**6**	**7**
(Australia) J Eagle (Australia) M Tebbutt	4	6
4	(Czech Republic) M Damm (Sweden) P Nyborg	4	**6**	2
2	(United States) **P Galbraith** (Russia) **A Olhovskiy**	**6**	4	**6**

Final
(United States) Kent Kinnear (United States) Dave Randall	3	**7**	6
2	(United States) **Patrick Galbraith** (Russia) **Andrei Olhovskiy**	**6**	6	**7**
