= 1979 Island Holidays Classic =

- Date: October 1–7
- Edition: 6th
- Category: Grand Prix
- Draw: 48S / 24D
- Prize money: $100,000
- Surface: Hard / outdoor
- Location: Maui, Hawaii, U.S.

Champions

Singles
- (United States) Bill Scanlon

Doubles
- (United States) Nick Saviano / (United Kingdom) John Lloyd
← 1978 ·	Hawaii Open	· 1980 →

The 1979 Island Holidays Classic, also known as the Hawaii Open, was a men's tennis tournament played an outdoor hard courts in Maui, Hawaii, in the United States that was part of the 1979 Colgate-Palmolive Grand Prix circuit. It was the sixth edition of the tournament and was held from October 1 through October 7, 1979. Seventh-seeded Bill Scanlon won his second consecutive singles title at the event.

== Finals ==
=== Singles ===
(United States) Bill Scanlon defeated (United States) Peter Fleming 6–1, 6–1

- It was Scanlon's only singles title of the year and the 2nd of his career.

=== Doubles ===
(United States) Nick Saviano / (United Kingdom) John Lloyd defeated (Australia) Rod Frawley / (Paraguay) Francisco González 7–5, 6–4
