= 1996 Internazionali di Carisbo – Doubles =

Doubles
- 1996 Internazionali di Carisbo
- 1995 Champions: (Zimbabwe) Byron Black (United States) Jonathan Stark

Final
- Champions: (South Africa) Brent Haygarth (South Africa) Christo van Rensburg
- Runners-up: (Morocco) Karim Alami (Hungary) Gábor Köves
- Score: 6–1, 6–4

Details
- Draw: 16
- Seeds: 4

Events
Singles	Doubles
← 1995 ·	Bologna Outdoor	· 1997 →

Byron Black and Jonathan Stark were the defending champions but did not compete that year.

Brent Haygarth and Christo van Rensburg won in the final 6–1, 6–4 against Karim Alami and Gábor Köves.

== Seeds ==
Champion seeds are indicated in bold text while text in italics indicates the round in which those seeds were eliminated.

1. (France) Rodolphe Gilbert / (Netherlands) Menno Oosting (semifinals)
2. (South Africa) **Brent Haygarth** / (South Africa) **Christo van Rensburg (champions)**
3. (Germany) Mathias Huning / (Australia) Jon Ireland (quarterfinals)
4. (Italy) Omar Camporese / (Spain) Emilio Sánchez (semifinals)

== Draw ==
=== Key ===
- Q = Qualifier
- WC = Wild card
- LL = Lucky loser
- Alt = Alternate
- SE = Special exempt
- PR = Protected ranking
- ITF = ITF entry
- JE = Junior exempt
- w/o = Walkover
- r = Retired
- d = Defaulted
- SR = Special ranking

First round
1	(France) **R Gilbert** (Netherlands) **M Oosting**	**6**	**6**
(United States) D Bowen (United States) G Carswell	4	4
WC	(Austria) **G Schaller** (Czech Republic) **B Ulihrach**	**6**	**6**
WC	(Italy) C Caratti (Italy) F Mordegan	4	3
3	(Germany) **M Huning** (Australia) **J Ireland**	**6**	**7**
(Venezuela) J Szymanski (Austria) H Wiltschnig	4	5
(Spain) J Alonso (Spain) F Clavet	1	2
(Morocco) **K Alami** (Hungary) **G Köves**	**6**	**6**
(Spain) **C Costa** (Italy) **S Pescosolido**	**7**	**6**
(Belgium) F Dewulf (Hungary) S Noszály	6	2
(Germany) P Baur (United States) J Waite	**6**	2	5
4	(Italy) **O Camporese** (Spain) **E Sánchez**	3	**6**	**7**
(Spain) **J Arrese** (Spain) **A Berasategui**	**6**	**6**
WC	(Italy) D Bracciali (Romania) R Sabău	2	2
Q	(Morocco) H Arazi (Italy) C Santoro	3	2
2	(South Africa) **B Haygarth** (South Africa) **C van Rensburg**	**6**	**6**

Quarterfinals
1	(France) **R Gilbert** (Netherlands) **M Oosting**	**6**	**6**
WC	(Austria) G Schaller (Czech Republic) B Ulihrach	4	3
3	(Germany) M Huning (Australia) J Ireland	4	4
(Morocco) **K Alami** (Hungary) **G Köves**	**6**	**6**
(Spain) C Costa (Italy) S Pescosolido
4	(Italy) **O Camporese** (Spain) **E Sánchez**	**w/o**
(Spain) J Arrese (Spain) A Berasategui	6	4
2	(South Africa) **B Haygarth** (South Africa) **C van Rensburg**	**7**	**6**

Semifinals
1	(France) R Gilbert (Netherlands) M Oosting	6	**6**	6
(Morocco) **K Alami** (Hungary) **G Köves**	**7**	4	**7**
4	(Italy) O Camporese (Spain) E Sánchez	3	4
2	(South Africa) **B Haygarth** (South Africa) **C van Rensburg**	**6**	**6**

Final
(Morocco) Karim Alami (Hungary) Gábor Köves	1	4
2	(South Africa) **Brent Haygarth** (South Africa) **Christo van Rensburg**	**6**	**6**
