= 1996 Salem Open – Singles =

Singles
- 1996 Salem Open
- 1995 Champion: (United States) Michael Chang

Final
- Champion: (United States) Pete Sampras
- Runner-up: (United States) Michael Chang
- Score: 6–4, 3–6, 6–4

Details
- Draw: 32
- Seeds: 8

Events
Singles	Doubles
← 1995 ·	Hong Kong Open	· 1997 →

Michael Chang was the defending champion but lost in the final 6–4, 3–6, 6–4 against Pete Sampras.

== Seeds ==
A champion seed is indicated in bold text while text in italics indicates the round in which that seed was eliminated.

1. (United States) **Pete Sampras (champion)**
2. (United States) Michael Chang (final)
3. (Australia) Mark Woodforde (second round)
4. (Netherlands) Richard Krajicek (quarterfinals)
5. (Netherlands) Jan Siemerink (semifinals)
6. (Australia) Todd Woodbridge (semifinals)
7. (New Zealand) Brett Steven (first round)
8. (Germany) David Prinosil (quarterfinals)

== Draw ==
=== Key ===
- Q = Qualifier
- WC = Wild card
- LL = Lucky loser
- Alt = Alternate
- SE = Special exempt
- PR = Protected ranking
- ITF = ITF entry
- JE = Junior exempt
- w/o = Walkover
- r = Retired
- d = Defaulted
- SR = Special ranking

First round
1	(United States) **P Sampras**	**6**	3	**6**
(Canada) S Lareau	1	**6**	1
WC	(Australia) **P Rafter**	**6**	**6**
WC	(Hong Kong) J Hui	0	1
Q	(Australia) **W Arthurs**	**6**	**6**
(Germany) J Renzenbrink	4	4
(The Bahamas) M Knowles	3	6^{4}
8	(Germany) **D Prinosil**	**6**	**7^{7}**
3	(Australia) **M Woodforde**	**6**	**6**
Q	(United States) K Kinnear	3	4
(Japan) **S Matsuoka**	6^{5}	**6**	**7^{8}**
(Australia) M Tebbutt	**7^{7}**	4	6^{6}
(Germany) C-U Steeb	**7^{7}**	5	2
(Denmark) **K Carlsen**	6^{5}	**7**	**6**
(United Kingdom) G Rusedski	**6**	4	4
5	(Netherlands) **J Siemerink**	2	**6**	**6**
6	(Australia) **T Woodbridge**	**6**	**6**
LL	(Sweden) P Nyborg	2	2
Q	(Australia) J Eagle	4	2
(Sweden) **T Johansson**	**6**	**6**
(Russia) **A Volkov**	**6**	**7**
Q	(United States) C Chang	4	5
WC	(China) B Pan	3	0
4	(Netherlands) **R Krajicek**	**6**	**6**
7	(New Zealand) B Steven	1	2
(Italy) **G Pozzi**	**6**	**6**
(Germany) B Karbacher	4	**6**	2
(Czech Republic) **M Damm**	**6**	2	**6**
(Russia) A Olhovskiy	6^{6}	1
(Germany) **H Dreekmann**	**7^{8}**	**6**
(South Africa) M Ondruska	6^{5}	1
2	(United States) **M Chang**	**7^{7}**	**6**

Second round
1	(United States) **P Sampras**	**6**	**7^{7}**
WC	(Australia) P Rafter	3	6^{1}
Q	(Australia) W Arthurs	4	4
8	(Germany) **D Prinosil**	**6**	**6**
3	(Australia) M Woodforde	4	**6**	4
(Japan) **S Matsuoka**	**6**	2	**6**
(Denmark) K Carlsen	3	4
5	(Netherlands) **J Siemerink**	**6**	**6**
6	(Australia) **T Woodbridge**	**6**	**6**
(Sweden) T Johansson	1	2
(Russia) A Volkov	6^{5}	3
4	(Netherlands) **R Krajicek**	**7^{7}**	**6**
(Italy) G Pozzi	3	2
(Czech Republic) **M Damm**	**6**	**6**
(Germany) H Dreekmann	5	3
2	(United States) **M Chang**	**7**	**6**

Quarterfinals
1	(United States) **P Sampras**	6^{2}	**7^{7}**	**6**
8	(Germany) D Prinosil	**7^{7}**	6^{3}	3
(Japan) S Matsuoka	3	**6**	6^{2}
5	(Netherlands) **J Siemerink**	**6**	2	**7^{7}**
6	(Australia) **T Woodbridge**	**6**	**7^{7}**
4	(Netherlands) R Krajicek	4	6^{5}
(Czech Republic) M Damm	0	**6**	3
2	(United States) **M Chang**	**6**	3	**6**

Semifinals
1	(United States) **P Sampras**	**6**	4	**7^{7}**
5	(Netherlands) J Siemerink	3	**6**	6^{2}
6	(Australia) T Woodbridge	3	4
2	(United States) **M Chang**	**6**	**6**

Final
1	(United States) **Pete Sampras**	**6**	3	**6**
2	(United States) Michael Chang	4	**6**	4
