= 1974 Hawaii Open =

- Date: September 30 – October 6
- Edition: 1st
- Category: Grand Prix (Grade B)
- Draw: 32S / 16D
- Prize money: $50,000
- Surface: Hard court / outdoor
- Location: Maui, Hawaii, U.S.

Champions

Singles
- (Australia) John Newcombe

Doubles
- (United States) Dick Stockton / (United States) Roscoe Tanner
Hawaii Open	· 1975 →

The 1974 Hawaii Open, also known by its sponsored name Island Holidays Pro Tennis Classic, was a men's tennis tournament played an outdoor hard courts in Maui, Hawaii in the United States. It was the inaugural edition of the tournament and was held from September 30 through October 6, 1974. The tournament was part of the Grand Prix tennis circuit and categorized in Group B. Second-seeded John Newcombe won the singles title and $9,000 first-prize money.

== Finals ==
=== Singles ===
(Australia) John Newcombe defeated (United States) Roscoe Tanner 7–6, 7–6

- It was Newcombe's 7th singles title of the year and the 29th of his career in the open era.

=== Doubles ===
(United States) Dick Stockton / (United States) Roscoe Tanner defeated (Australia) Owen Davidson / (Australia) John Newcombe 6–3, 7–6
