= 1975 Hawaii Open =

- Date: 29 September – 5 October
- Edition: 2nd
- Category: Grand Prix (Grade B)
- Draw: 32S / 16D
- Prize money: $50,000
- Surface: Hard court / outdoor
- Location: Maui, Hawaii, U.S.

Champions

Singles
- (United States) Jimmy Connors

Doubles
- (United States) Fred McNair / (United States) Sherwood Stewart
← 1974 ·	Hawaii Open	· 1976 →

The 1975 Hawaii Open, also known by its sponsored name Island Holidays Pro Classic, was a men's tennis tournament played an outdoor hard courts in Maui, Hawaii, in the United States. It was the second edition of the tournament and was held from 29 September through 5 October 1975. The tournament was part of the Grand Prix tennis circuit and categorized in Group B. First-seeded Jimmy Connors won the singles title.

== Finals ==
=== Singles ===
(United States) Jimmy Connors defeated (United States) Sandy Mayer 6–1, 6–0

- It was Connors's 9th singles title of the year and the 41st of his career.

=== Doubles ===
(United States) Fred McNair / (United States) Sherwood Stewart defeated (United States) Jeff Borowiak / (Pakistan) Haroon Rahim 3–6, 7–6, 6–3
