= 1997 Salem Open =

- Date: 7–13 April
- Edition: 22nd
- Category: World Series
- Draw: 32S / 16D
- Prize money: $303,000
- Surface: Hard / outdoor
- Location: Hong Kong, Hong Kong

Champions

Singles
- (United States) Michael Chang

Doubles
- (Czech Republic) Martin Damm / (Czech Republic) Daniel Vacek
- Hong Kong Open

The 1997 Salem Open was a men's tennis tournament played on outdoor hard courts in Hong Kong that was part of the World Series of the 1997 ATP Tour. It was the 22nd edition of the tournament and was held from 7 April through 132 April 1997. First-seeded Michael Chang won the singles title.

== Finals ==
=== Singles ===
(United States) Michael Chang defeated (Australia) Patrick Rafter, 6–3, 6–3

- It was Chang's 3rd singles title of the year and the 23rd of his career.

=== Doubles ===
(Czech Republic) Martin Damm / (Czech Republic) Daniel Vacek defeated (Germany) Karsten Braasch / (United States) Jeff Tarango, 6–3, 6–4
