= 1994 Internazionali di Carisbo – Singles =

Singles
- 1994 Internazionali di Carisbo

Final
- Champion: (Spain) Javier Sánchez
- Runner-up: (Spain) Alberto Berasategui
- Score: 7–6^{(7–3)}, 4–6, 6–3

Details
- Draw: 32 (3WC/4Q)
- Seeds: 8

Events
Singles	Doubles
- Bologna Outdoor

Jordi Burillo was the defending champion, but lost in the quarterfinals to Javier Sánchez.

Sánchez won the title by defeating Alberto Berasategui 7–6^{(7–3)}, 4–6, 6–3 in the final.

== Seeds ==
1. (Spain) Alberto Berasategui (final)
2. (Australia) Patrick Rafter (second round)
3. (Spain) Javier Sánchez (champion)
4. (Italy) Andrea Gaudenzi (quarterfinals)
5. (Spain) Jordi Arrese (second round)
6. (Czech Republic) Sláva Doseděl (semifinals)
7. (Germany) Marc-Kevin Goellner (second round)
8. (Morocco) Younes El Aynaoui (first round)

== Draw ==
Key

- Q = Qualifier
- WC = Wild card
- LL = Lucky loser
- Alt = Alternate
- ITF = ITF entry
- PR = Protected ranking
- SR = Special ranking
- SE = Special exempt
- JE = Junior exempt
- JR = Junior Accelerator Programme entrant
- CO = College Accelerator Programme entrant
- NG = Next Gen Accelerator Program entrant
- w/o = Walkover
- r = Retired
- d = Defaulted

=== Finals ===
Semifinals
1	(Spain) Alberto Berasategui	7	6
6	(Czech Republic) Sláva Doseděl	5	2
3	(Spain) Javier Sánchez	6	6
(Italy) Stefano Pescosolido	3	2

Final
1	(Spain) Alberto Berasategui	6^{3}	6	3
3	(Spain) Javier Sánchez	7^{7}	4	6

=== Top half ===
First round
1	(Spain) A Berasategui	6	6
(United States) C Adams	2	0
Q	(Australia) R Fromberg	6	4	3
(Brazil) F Meligeni	3	6	6
Q	(Italy) F Mordegan	6	6
(United Kingdom) M Petchey	2	2
(Spain) F Clavet	6	3	4
WC/7	(Germany) MK Goellner	2	6	6
4	(Italy) A Gaudenzi	6	2	6
(Germany) CU Steeb	1	6	4
WC	(Italy) O Camporese	1	2
(Denmark) K Carlsen	6	6
(Spain) E Sánchez	6^{16}	6	3
(United States) B Shelton	7^{18}	4	6
(Argentina) F Davín	6	2	2
6	(Czech Republic) S Doseděl	4	6	6

Second round
1	(Spain) A Berasategui	6	6
(Brazil) F Meligeni	1	3
Q	(Italy) F Mordegan	6	3	6
WC/7	(Germany) MK Goellner	4	6	3
4	(Italy) A Gaudenzi	6	6
(Denmark) K Carlsen	2	3
(United States) B Shelton	2	4
6	(Czech Republic) S Doseděl	6	6

Quarterfinals
1	(Spain) A Berasategui	6	6
Q	(Italy) F Mordegan	1	4
4	(Italy) A Gaudenzi	3	3
6	(Czech Republic) S Doseděl	6	6

Semifinals
1	(Spain) A Berasategui	7	6
6	(Czech Republic) S Doseděl	5	2

=== Bottom half ===
First round
5	(Spain) J Arrese	7	7^{7}
(Canada) G Rusedski	5	6^{1}
Q	(Morocco) K Alami	4	3
(Spain) J Burillo	6	6
WC	(Italy) P Canè	6	3	3
(Belgium) X Daufresne	3	6	6
(Germany) H Dreekmann	3	6	6^{8}
3	(Spain) J Sánchez	6	3	7^{10}
8	(Morocco) Y El Aynaoui	0	6	2
(Italy) S Pescosolido	6	3	6
(Brazil) L Mattar	4	3
(Argentina) H de la Peña	6	6
(United States) J Tarango	6	6
Q	(Italy) M Meneschincheri	4	0
(Austria) G Schaller	6^{4}	4
2	(Australia) P Rafter	7^{7}	6

Second round
5	(Spain) J Arrese	4	2
(Spain) J Burillo	6	6
(Belgium) X Daufresne	2	4
3	(Spain) J Sánchez	6	6
(Italy) S Pescosolido	6	6
(Argentina) H de la Peña	4	2
(United States) J Tarango	6^{7}	6	7
2	(Australia) P Rafter	7^{9}	2	5

Quarterfinals
(Spain) J Burillo	2	6	3
3	(Spain) J Sánchez	6	4	6
(Italy) S Pescosolido	7	6
(United States) J Tarango	5	4

Semifinals
3	(Spain) J Sánchez	6	6
(Italy) S Pescosolido	3	2
