= 1996 Internazionali di Carisbo – Singles =

Singles
- 1996 Internazionali di Carisbo
- 1995 Champion: (Chile) Marcelo Ríos

Final
- Champion: (Spain) Alberto Berasategui
- Runner-up: (Spain) Carlos Costa
- Score: 6–3, 6–4

Details
- Draw: 32
- Seeds: 8

Events
Singles	Doubles
← 1995 ·	Bologna Outdoor	· 1997 →

Marcelo Ríos was the defending champion but did not compete that year.

Alberto Berasategui won in the final 6–3, 6–4 against Carlos Costa.

== Seeds ==
A champion seed is indicated in bold text while text in italics indicates the round in which that seed was eliminated.

1. (Spain) Carlos Costa (final)
2. (Spain) Francisco Clavet (semifinals)
3. (Austria) Gilbert Schaller (second round)
4. (Czech Republic) Bohdan Ulihrach (semifinals)
5. (Spain) **Alberto Berasategui (champions)**
6. (Ukraine) Andriy Medvedev (first round)
7. (Spain) Félix Mantilla (second round)
8. (Belgium) Filip Dewulf (first round)

== Draw ==
=== Key ===
- Q = Qualifier
- WC = Wild card
- LL = Lucky loser
- Alt = Alternate
- SE = Special exempt
- PR = Protected ranking
- ITF = ITF entry
- JE = Junior exempt
- w/o = Walkover
- r = Retired
- d = Defaulted
- SR = Special ranking

First round
WC/1	(Spain) **C Costa**	**6**	**6**
(Spain) J Arrese	4	3
WC	(Argentina) G Pérez Roldán	1	3
Q	(Spain) **J Díaz**	**6**	**6**
Q	(Spain) J A Viloca	4	2
Q	(Venezuela) **J Szymanski**	**6**	**6**
(Germany) P Baur	6^{4}	2
7	(Spain) **F Mantilla**	**7^{7}**	**6**
4	(Czech Republic) **B Ulihrach**	**7^{7}**	**6**
(France) L Roux	6^{4}	4
Q	(Austria) H Wiltschnig	**6**	1	4
(Australia) **R Fromberg**	3	**6**	**6**
(Italy) O Camporese	4	4
(Spain) **J Sánchez**	**6**	**6**
(Morocco) **H Arazi**	**6**	3	**6**
WC/6	(Ukraine) A Medvedev	4	**6**	3
5	(Spain) **A Berasategui**	3	**7^{7}**	**6**
(Hungary) S Noszály	**6**	6^{3}	0
(Spain) **G Blanco**	**6**	**6**
(Morocco) Y El Aynaoui	3	2
(Italy) C Caratti	5	1
(Russia) **A Chesnokov**	**7**	**6**
(France) R Gilbert	5	4
3	(Austria) **G Schaller**	**7**	**6**
8	(Belgium) F Dewulf	4	**6**	4
(Belgium) **K Goossens**	**6**	3	**6**
(Morocco) **K Alami**	4	**7^{10}**	**7^{7}**
(Spain) R Carretero	**6**	6^{8}	6^{3}
(Norway) **C Ruud**	**6**	**7**
(Spain) E Sánchez	4	5
(Italy) S Pescosolido	2	3
2	(Spain) **F Clavet**	**6**	**6**

Second round
WC/1	(Spain) **C Costa**	**6**	2	**6**
Q	(Spain) J Díaz	2	**6**	1
Q	(Venezuela) **J Szymanski**	**6**	5	**6**
7	(Spain) F Mantilla	2	**7**	4
4	(Czech Republic) **B Ulihrach**	**6**	**6**
(Australia) R Fromberg	4	2
(Spain) **J Sánchez**	**6**	**6**
(Morocco) H Arazi	0	4
5	(Spain) **A Berasategui**	3	**7**	**6**
(Spain) G Blanco	**6**	5	4
(Russia) **A Chesnokov**	**6**	**6**
3	(Austria) G Schaller	4	4
(Belgium) K Goossens	4	**6**	2
(Morocco) **K Alami**	**6**	4	**6**
(Norway) C Ruud	4	2
2	(Spain) **F Clavet**	**6**	**6**

Quarterfinals
WC/1	(Spain) **C Costa**	**7**	2	**6**
Q	(Venezuela) J Szymanski	5	**6**	3
4	(Czech Republic) **B Ulihrach**	**6**	**6**
(Spain) J Sánchez	4	4
5	(Spain) **A Berasategui**	**6**	**6**
(Russia) A Chesnokov	1	2
(Morocco) K Alami	4	4
2	(Spain) **F Clavet**	**6**	**6**

Semifinals
WC/1	(Spain) **C Costa**	**7^{8}**	**6**
4	(Czech Republic) B Ulihrach	6^{6}	1
5	(Spain) **A Berasategui**	**6**	**6**
2	(Spain) F Clavet	2	3

Final
WC/1	(Spain) Carlos Costa	3	4
5	(Spain) **A Berasategui**	**6**	**6**
