= 1996 Internazionali di Carisbo =

ATP tennis tournament in Bologna

- Date: 17–23 June
- Edition: 12th
- Category: World Series
- Draw: 32S / 16D
- Prize money: $303,000
- Surface: Clay / outdoor
- Location: Bologna, Italy
- Venue: Cierrebi Club

Champions

Singles
- (Spain) Alberto Berasategui

Doubles
- (South Africa) Brent Haygarth / (South Africa) Christo van Rensburg
← 1995 ·	Bologna Outdoor	· 1997 →

The 1996 Internazionali di Carisbo was a men's tennis tournament played on outdoor clay courts at the Cierrebi Club in Bologna in Italy and was part of the World Series of the 1996 ATP Tour. It was the twelfth edition of the tournament and was held from 17 June through 23 June 1996. Fifth-seeded Alberto Berasategui won the singles title.

== Finals ==
=== Singles ===
(Spain) Alberto Berasategui defeated (Spain) Carlos Costa 6–3, 6–4

- It was Berasategui's 1st singles title of the year and the 10th of his career.

=== Doubles ===
(South Africa) Brent Haygarth / (South Africa) Christo van Rensburg defeated (Morocco) Karim Alami / (Hungary) Gábor Köves 6–1, 6–4

- It was Haygarth's 2nd title of the year and the 4th of his career. It was van Rensburg's 2nd title of the year and the 22nd of his career.
