= 1997 Salem Open – Doubles =

Doubles
- 1997 Salem Open

Final
- Champions: (Czech Republic) Martin Damm (Czech Republic) Daniel Vacek
- Runners-up: (Germany) Karsten Braasch (United States) Jeff Tarango
- Score: 6–3, 6–4

Details
- Draw: 16 (2WC/1Q/1LL)
- Seeds: 4

Events
Singles	Doubles
← 1996 ·	Hong Kong Open	· 1998 →

Patrick Galbraith and Andrei Olhovskiy were the defending champions, but Galbraith did not compete this year. Olhovskiy teamed up with David Adams and lost in the first round to Karsten Braasch and Jeff Tarango.

Martin Damm and Daniel Vacek won the title by defeating Braasch and Tarango 6–3, 6–4 in the final.

== Seeds ==
1. (Australia) Todd Woodbridge / (Australia) Mark Woodforde (semifinals)
2. (South Africa) David Adams / (Russia) Andrei Olhovskiy (first round)
3. (Czech Republic) Martin Damm / (Czech Republic) Daniel Vacek (champions)
4. (United States) Brian MacPhie / (Canada) Daniel Nestor (quarterfinals, withdrew)

== Draw ==
=== Key ===
- Q = Qualifier
- WC = Wild card
- LL = Lucky loser
- Alt = Alternate
- SE = Special exempt
- PR = Protected ranking
- ITF = ITF entry
- JE = Junior exempt
- w/o = Walkover
- r = Retired
- d = Defaulted
- SR = Special ranking

=== Draw ===
First round
1	(Australia) T Woodbridge (Australia) M Woodforde	7	6
(South Africa) C Ferreira (United Kingdom) D Sapsford	6	0
WC	(United States) C Chang (Japan) S Matsuoka	6	4	3
(United States) D Flach (Sweden) H Holm	4	6	6
3	(Czech Republic) M Damm (Czech Republic) D Vacek	4	6	6
(Australia) J Eagle (Australia) A Florent	6	3	1
(Germany) D Prinosil (France) G Raoux	6	6
LL	(Japan) M Takada (Japan) R Tsujino	1	2
(Australia) W Arthurs (Australia) A Kratzmann	6	7	3
(South Africa) N Godwin (Zimbabwe) K Ullyett	7	5	6
(United States) J Gimelstob (Australia) P Rafter	7	3	5
4	(United States) B MacPhie (Canada) D Nestor	6	6	7
Q	(United Kingdom) A Foster (Sweden) LA Wahlgren	7	6
WC	(Switzerland) M Rosset (France) S Simian	6	4
(Germany) K Braasch (United States) J Tarango	6	6
2	(South Africa) D Adams (Russia) A Olhovskiy	1	3

Quarterfinals
1	(Australia) T Woodbridge (Australia) M Woodforde	6	1	6
(United States) D Flach (Sweden) H Holm	4	6	4
3	(Czech Republic) M Damm (Czech Republic) D Vacek	w/o
(Germany) D Prinosil (France) G Raoux
(South Africa) N Godwin (Zimbabwe) K Ullyett	w/o
4	(United States) B MacPhie (Canada) D Nestor
Q	(United Kingdom) A Foster (Sweden) LA Wahlgren	1	2
(Germany) K Braasch (United States) J Tarango	6	6

Semifinals
1	(Australia) T Woodbridge (Australia) M Woodforde	6	3	4
3	(Czech Republic) M Damm (Czech Republic) D Vacek	3	6	6
(South Africa) N Godwin (Zimbabwe) K Ullyett	6	3
(Germany) K Braasch (United States) J Tarango	7	6

Final
3	(Czech Republic) M Damm (Czech Republic) D Vacek	6	6
(Germany) K Braasch (United States) J Tarango	3	4
