= 1994 Internazionali di Carisbo =

ATP tennis tournament in Bologna

- Date: 16–22 May
- Edition: 10th
- Category: World Series
- Draw: 32S / 16D
- Prize money: $288,750
- Surface: Clay / outdoor
- Location: Bologna, Italy
- Venue: Cierrebi Club

Champions

Singles
- (Spain) Javier Sánchez

Doubles
- (Australia) John Fitzgerald / (Australia) Patrick Rafter
- Bologna Outdoor

The 1994 Internazionali di Carisbo, also known as the Bologna Open, was a men's tennis tournament played on outdoor clay courts at the Cierrebi Club in Bologna in Italy and was part of the World Series of the 1994 ATP Tour. It was the tenth edition of the tournament and was held from 16 May until 22 May 1994. Third-seeded Javier Sánchez won the singles title.

== Finals ==
=== Singles ===
(Spain) Javier Sánchez defeated (Spain) Alberto Berasategui 7–6^{(7–3)}, 4–6, 6–3

- It was Sánchez' only singles title of the year and the 3rd of his career.

=== Doubles ===
(Australia) John Fitzgerald / (Australia) Patrick Rafter defeated (Czech Republic) Vojtěch Flégl / (Australia) Andrew Florent 6–3, 6–3

- It was Fitzgerald's 1st doubles title of the year and the 29th of his career. It was Rafter's only doubles title of the year and the 1st of his career.
