= John Fitzgerald career statistics =

This is a list of the main career statistics of former professional Australian tennis player John Fitzgerald.

== Grand Slam finals ==
=== Doubles (7 titles, 4 runners-up) ===
Result	Year	Championship	Surface	Partner	Opponents	Score
Win	1982	Australian Open	Grass	(Australia) John Alexander	(United States) Andy Andrews (United States) John Sadri	6–7, 6–2, 7–6
Win	1984	US Open	Hard	(Czech Republic) Tomáš Šmíd	(Sweden) Stefan Edberg (Sweden) Anders Järryd	7–6, 6–3, 6–3
Loss	1985	Wimbledon	Grass	(Australia) Pat Cash	(Switzerland) Heinz Günthardt (Hungary) Balázs Taróczy	4–6, 3–6, 6–4, 3–6
Win	1986	French Open	Clay	(Czech Republic) Tomáš Šmíd	(Sweden) Stefan Edberg (Sweden) Anders Järryd	6–3, 4–6, 6–3, 6–7, 14–12
Loss	1988	French Open	Clay	(Sweden) Anders Järryd	(Ecuador) Andrés Gómez (Spain) Emilio Sánchez	3–6, 7–6, 4–6, 3–6
Loss	1988	Wimbledon	Grass	(Sweden) Anders Järryd	(United States) Ken Flach (United States) Robert Seguso	4–6, 6–2, 4–6, 6–7
Win	1989	Wimbledon	Grass	(Sweden) Anders Järryd	(United States) Rick Leach (United States) Jim Pugh	3–6, 7–6, 6–4, 7–6
Win	1991	French Open	Clay	(Sweden) Anders Järryd	(United States) Rick Leach (United States) Jim Pugh	6–0, 7–6
Win	1991	Wimbledon	Grass	(Sweden) Anders Järryd	(Argentina) Javier Frana (Mexico) Leonardo Lavalle	6–3, 6–4, 6–7, 6–1
Win	1991	US Open	Hard	(Sweden) Anders Järryd	(United States) Scott Davis (United States) David Pate	6–3, 3–6, 6–3, 6–3
Loss	1993	Australian Open	Hard	(Sweden) Anders Järryd	(South Africa) Danie Visser (Australia) Laurie Warder	4–6, 3–6, 4–6

=== Mixed doubles (2 titles, 4 runners-up) ===
Result	Year	Championship	Surface	Partner	Opponents	Score
Win	1983	US Open	Hard	(Australia) Elizabeth Sayers	(United States) Barbara Potter (United States) Ferdi Taygan	3–6, 6–3, 6–4
Loss	1984	US Open	Hard	(Australia) Elizabeth Sayers	(Bulgaria) Manuela Maleeva (United States) Tom Gullikson	6–2, 5–7, 4–6
Loss	1985	Wimbledon	Grass	(Australia) Elizabeth Smylie	(United States) Martina Navratilova (Australia) Paul McNamee	5–7, 6–4, 2–6
Loss	1985	US Open	Hard	(Australia) Elizabeth Smylie	(United States) Martina Navratilova (Switzerland) Heinz Günthardt	3–6, 4–6
Loss	1990	Wimbledon	Grass	(Australia) Elizabeth Smylie	(United States) Zina Garrison (United States) Rick Leach	5–7, 2–6
Win	1991	Wimbledon	Grass	(Australia) Elizabeth Smylie	(Soviet Union) Natasha Zvereva (United States) Jim Pugh	7–6^{(7–4)}, 6–2

== Career finals ==
=== Singles: 11 (6-5) ===
Wins (6)
No.	Date	Tournament	Surface	Opponent	Score
1.	1981	Kitzbühel, Austria	Clay	(Argentina) Guillermo Vilas	3–6, 6–3, 7–5
2.	1982	Maui, Hawaii, US	Hard	(United States) Brian Teacher	6–2, 6–3
3.	1983	Newport, Rhode Island, US	Grass	(United States) Scott Davis	2–6, 6–1, 6–3
4.	1983	Stowe, Vermont, US	Hard	(India) Vijay Amritraj	3–6, 6–2, 7–5
5.	1984	Sydney, Australia	Grass	(United States) Sammy Giammalva, Jr.	6–3, 6–3
6.	1988	Sydney, Australia	Grass	(Soviet Union) Andrei Chesnokov	6–3, 6–4

Runners-up (5)
No.	Date	Tournament	Surface	Opponent	Score
1.	1982	Sydney, Australia	Grass	(Australia) John Alexander	6–4, 6–7, 4–6
2.	1984	Melbourne Outdoor, Australia	Grass	(United States) Dan Cassidy	6–7, 6–7
3.	1987	Hong Kong	Hard	(United States) Eliot Teltscher	7–6^{(6–8)}, 6–3, 1–6, 2–6, 5–7
4.	1988	Philadelphia, Pennsylvania, US	Carpet (i)	(United States) Tim Mayotte	6–4, 2–6, 2–6, 3–6
5.	1988	Tokyo, Japan	Carpet (i)	(Germany) Boris Becker	6–7^{(4–7)}, 4–6

=== Doubles: 61 (30-31) ===
Wins (30)
No.	Date	Tournament	Surface	Partner	Opponent	Score
1.	1981	Båstad, Sweden	Clay	(Australia) Mark Edmondson	(Sweden) Anders Järryd (Sweden) Hans Simonsson	2–6, 7–5, 6–0
2.	1982	Strasbourg WCT, France	Carpet	(Poland) Wojciech Fibak	(United States) Sandy Mayer (South Africa) Frew McMillan	6–4, 6–3
3.	1982	Australian Open, Melbourne	Grass	(Australia) John Alexander	(United States) Andy Andrews (United States) John Sadri	6–7, 6–2, 7–6
4.	1982	Sydney Outdoor, Australia	Grass	(Australia) John Alexander	(Australia) Cliff Letcher (Australia) Craig Miller	6–4, 7–6
5.	1983	Bristol, England	Grass	(Australia) John Alexander	(United States) Tom Gullikson (United States) Johan Kriek	7–5, 6–4
6.	1983	Newport, US	Grass	(India) Vijay Amritraj	(United States) Tim Gullikson (United States) Tom Gullikson	6–3, 6–4
7.	1984	U.S. Open, New York	Hard	(Czech Republic) Tomáš Šmíd	(Sweden) Stefan Edberg (Sweden) Anders Järryd	7–6, 6–3, 6–3
8.	1985	Auckland, New Zealand	Hard	(New Zealand) Chris Lewis	(Australia) Broderick Dyke (Australia) Wally Masur	7–6, 6–2
9.	1985	Las Vegas, US	Hard	(Australia) Pat Cash	(United States) Paul Annacone (South Africa) Christo van Rensburg	7–6, 6–7, 7–6
10.	1985	Sydney Indoor, Australia	Hard (i)	(Sweden) Anders Järryd	(Australia) Mark Edmondson (Australia) Kim Warwick	6–3, 6–2
11.	1986	French Open, Paris	Clay	(Czech Republic) Tomáš Šmíd	(Sweden) Stefan Edberg (Sweden) Anders Järryd	6–3, 4–6, 6–3, 6–7, 14–12
12.	1986	Sydney Indoor, Australia	Hard (i)	(Germany) Boris Becker	(Australia) Peter McNamara (Australia) Paul McNamee	6–4, 7–6
13.	1988	Miami, US	Hard	(Sweden) Anders Järryd	(United States) Ken Flach (United States) Robert Seguso	7–6, 6–1, 7–5
14.	1988	Tokyo Outdoor, Japan	Hard	(United States) Johan Kriek	(United States) Steve Denton (United States) David Pate	6–4, 6–4
15.	1988	Sydney Indoor, Australia	Hard (i)	(Australia) Darren Cahill	(United States) Martin Davis (Australia) Brad Drewett	6–3, 6–2
16.	1988	Paris Indoor, France	Carpet	(United States) Paul Annacone	(United States) Jim Grabb (South Africa) Christo van Rensburg	6–2, 6–2
17.	1989	Wimbledon, London	Grass	(Sweden) Anders Järryd	(United States) Rick Leach (United States) Jim Pugh	3–6, 7–6, 6–4, 7–6
18.	1989	Paris Indoor, France	Carpet	(Sweden) Anders Järryd	(Switzerland) Jakob Hlasek (France) Eric Winogradsky	7–6, 6–4
19.	1991	French Open, Paris	Clay	(Sweden) Anders Järryd	(United States) Rick Leach (United States) Jim Pugh	6–0, 7–6
20.	1991	Wimbledon, London	Grass	(Sweden) Anders Järryd	(Argentina) Javier Frana (Mexico) Leonardo Lavalle	6–3, 6–4, 6–7, 6–1
21.	1991	U.S. Open, New York	Hard	(Sweden) Anders Järryd	(United States) Scott Davis (United States) David Pate	6–3, 3–6, 6–3, 6–3
22.	1991	Stockholm, Sweden	Carpet	(Sweden) Anders Järryd	(Netherlands) Tom Nijssen (Czech Republic) Cyril Suk	7–5, 6–3
23.	1991	Paris Indoor, France	Carpet	(Sweden) Anders Järryd	(United States) Kelly Jones (United States) Rick Leach	7–6, 6–4
24.	1991	Doubles Championships, Johannesburg	Hard (i)	(Sweden) Anders Järryd	(United States) Ken Flach (United States) Robert Seguso	6–4, 6–4, 2–6, 6–4
25.	1992	London/Queen's Club, England	Grass	(Sweden) Anders Järryd	(United States) Tim Gullikson (United States) Tom Gullikson	7–6, 2–6, 16–14
26.	1992	Taipei, Taiwan	Carpet	(Australia) Sandon Stolle	(Germany) Patrick Baur (South Africa) Christo van Rensburg	7–6, 6–2
27.	1992	Antwerp, Belgium	Carpet	(Sweden) Anders Järryd	(United States) Patrick McEnroe (United States) Jared Palmer	6–2, 6–2
28.	1993	Dubai, UAE	Hard	(Sweden) Anders Järryd	(Canada) Grant Connell (United States) Patrick Galbraith	6–2, 6–1
29.	1994	Bologna, Italy	Clay	(Australia) Patrick Rafter	(Czech Republic) Vojtech Flegl (Australia) Andrew Florent	6–3, 6–3
30.	1994	Los Angeles, US	Hard	(Australia) Mark Woodforde	(United States) Scott Davis (United States) Brian MacPhie	4–6, 6–2, 6–0

Runners-up (31)
No.	Date	Tournament	Surface	Partner	Opponent	Score
1.	1981	Forest Hills WCT, US	Clay	(United States) Andy Kohlberg	(United States) Peter Fleming (United States) John McEnroe	7–5, 4–6, 3–6
2.	1982	Zurich WCT, Switzerland	Carpet	(Poland) Wojciech Fibak	(United States) Sammy Giammalva Jr. (United States) Tom Gullikson	4–6, 2–6
3.	1982	Rome, Italy	Clay	(Poland) Wojciech Fibak	(Switzerland) Heinz Günthardt (Hungary) Balázs Taróczy	4–6, 6–4, 3–6
4.	1983	Columbus, US	Hard	(India) Vijay Amritraj	(United States) Scott Davis (United States) Brian Teacher	1–6, 6–4, 6–7
5.	1983	Tokyo Indoor, Japan	Carpet	(United States) Steve Denton	(Australia) Mark Edmondson (United States) Sherwood Stewart	1–6, 4–6
6.	1984	Bristol, England	Grass	(Australia) John Alexander	(United States) Larry Stefanki (United States) Robert Van't Hof	6–7, 6–7
7.	1984	Toronto, Canada	Hard	(Australia) Kim Warwick	(United States) Peter Fleming (United States) John McEnroe	4–6, 6–7
8.	1985	London/Queen's Club, England	Grass	(Australia) Pat Cash	(United States) Ken Flach (United States) Robert Seguso	6–3, 3–6, 14–16
9.	1985	Wimbledon, London	Grass	(Australia) Pat Cash	(Switzerland) Heinz Günthardt (Hungary) Balázs Taróczy	4–6, 3–6, 6–4, 3–6
10.	1986	Brussels, Belgium	Carpet	(Czech Republic) Tomáš Šmíd	(Germany) Boris Becker (Socialist Federal Republic of Yugoslavia) Slobodan Živojinović	6–7, 5–7
11.	1986	Indianapolis, US	Clay	(United States) Sherwood Stewart	(Chile) Hans Gildemeister (Ecuador) Andrés Gómez	4–6, 6–7
12.	1987	Cincinnati, US	Hard	(United States) Steve Denton	(United States) Ken Flach (United States) Robert Seguso	5–7, 3–6
13.	1988	French Open, Paris	Clay	(Sweden) Anders Järryd	(Ecuador) Andrés Gómez (Spain) Emilio Sánchez	3–6, 7–6, 4–6, 3–6
14.	1988	Wimbledon, London	Grass	(Sweden) Anders Järryd	(United States) Ken Flach (United States) Robert Seguso	4–6, 6–2, 4–6, 6–7
15.	1988	Stockholm, Sweden	Hard (i)	(United States) Paul Annacone	(United States) Kevin Curren (United States) Jim Grabb	5–7, 5–7
16.	1988	Brussels, Belgium	Carpet	(Czech Republic) Tomáš Šmíd	(Australia) Wally Masur (Netherlands) Tom Nijssen	W/O
17.	1989	Los Angeles, US	Hard	(Sweden) Anders Järryd	(United States) Martin Davis (United States) Tim Pawsat	5–7, 6–7
18.	1989	Masters Doubles, London	Carpet	(Sweden) Anders Järryd	(United States) Jim Grabb (United States) Patrick McEnroe	5–7, 6–7, 7–5, 3–6
19.	1990	Stockholm, Sweden	Carpet	(Sweden) Anders Järryd	(France) Guy Forget (Switzerland) Jakob Hlasek	2–6, 3–6
20.	1990	Moscow, Russia	Carpet	(Sweden) Anders Järryd	(Netherlands) Hendrik Jan Davids (Netherlands) Paul Haarhuis	4–6, 6–7
21.	1991	Memphis, US	Hard (i)	(Australia) Laurie Warder	(Germany) Udo Riglewski (Germany) Michael Stich	2–6, 7–6, 3–6
22.	1991	Tokyo Outdoor, Japan	Hard	(Sweden) Anders Järryd	(Sweden) Stefan Edberg (Australia) Todd Woodbridge	3–6, 6–7
23.	1991	Brisbane, Australia	Hard	(Canada) Glenn Michibata	(Australia) Mark Woodforde (Australia) Todd Woodbridge	6–7, 3–6
24.	1992	Stuttgart Indoor, Germany	Carpet	(Sweden) Anders Järryd	(Netherlands) Tom Nijssen (Czech Republic) Cyril Suk	3–6, 7–6, 3–6
25.	1992	Tokyo Outdoor, Japan	Hard	(Sweden) Anders Järryd	(United States) Kelly Jones (United States) Rick Leach	1–6, 7–6, 4–6
26.	1992	Doubles Championships, Johannesburg	Hard	(Sweden) Anders Järryd	(Australia) Mark Woodforde (Australia) Todd Woodbridge	2–6, 6–7, 7–5, 6–3, 3–6
27.	1993	Adelaide, Australia	Hard	(Australia) Laurie Warder	(Australia) Mark Woodforde (Australia) Todd Woodbridge	4–6, 5–7
28.	1993	Australian Open, Melbourne	Hard	(Sweden) Anders Järryd	(South Africa) Danie Visser (Australia) Laurie Warder	4–6, 3–6, 4–6
29.	1994	Dubai, UAE	Hard	(Australia) Darren Cahill	(Australia) Mark Woodforde (Australia) Todd Woodbridge	7–6, 4–6, 2–6
30.	1995	Tokyo Outdoor, Japan	Hard	(Sweden) Anders Järryd	(The Bahamas) Mark Knowles (United States) Jonathan Stark	3–6, 6–3, 6–7
31.	1995	Hong Kong	Hard	(Sweden) Anders Järryd	(United States) Tommy Ho (Australia) Mark Philippoussis	1–6, 7–6, 6–7
