= 1994 Salem Open – Doubles =

Doubles
- 1994 Salem Open

Final
- Champions: (United States) Jim Grabb (New Zealand) Brett Steven
- Runners-up: (Sweden) Jonas Björkman (Australia) Patrick Rafter
- Score: Walkover

Details
- Draw: 16 (2WC/1Q)
- Seeds: 4

Events
Singles	Doubles
- Hong Kong Open

David Wheaton and Todd Woodbridge were the defending champions, but Woodbridge did not compete this year. Wheaton teamed up with Kent Kinnear and lost in the first round to Jonas Björkman and Patrick Rafter.

Jim Grabb and Brett Steven won the title, as their opponents Björkman and Rafter were forced to withdraw before the final.

== Seeds ==
1. (Zimbabwe) Byron Black / (United States) Jonathan Stark (first round)
2. (South Africa) David Adams / (Russia) Andrei Olhovskiy (quarterfinals)
3. (Sweden) Jonas Björkman / (Australia) Patrick Rafter (final, withdrew)
4. (United Kingdom) Jeremy Bates / (Argentina) Javier Frana (quarterfinals)

== Draw ==
Key

- Q = Qualifier
- WC = Wild card
- LL = Lucky loser
- Alt = Alternate
- ITF = ITF entry
- PR = Protected ranking
- SR = Special ranking
- SE = Special exempt
- JE = Junior exempt
- JR = Junior Accelerator Programme entrant
- CO = College Accelerator Programme entrant
- NG = Next Gen Accelerator Program entrant
- w/o = Walkover
- r = Retired
- d = Defaulted

=== Draw ===
First round
1	(Zimbabwe) B Black (United States) J Stark	1	3
(Venezuela) M Ruah (Australia) S Stolle	6	6
(Canada) S Lareau (Canada) D Nestor	6	6
(Germany) A Mronz (Germany) L Rehmann	3	4
3	(Sweden) J Björkman (Australia) P Rafter	6	6
(United States) K Kinnear (United States) D Wheaton	3	3
(Australia) N Borwick (United Kingdom) M Petchey	6	6	6
(Austria) A Antonitsch (Netherlands) J Siemerink	4	7	7
(United States) K Jones (United States) M Keil	4	2
(United States) J Grabb (New Zealand) B Steven	6	6
WC	(Canada) A Chang (Japan) S Matsuoka	6	6
4	(United Kingdom) J Bates (Argentina) J Frana	7	7
WC	(Denmark) K Carlsen (United States) I Lendl	6	4	7
Q	(United States) J Tarango (Australia) M Tebbutt	2	6	6
(Italy) G Pozzi (Germany) J Renzenbrink	6	3	2
2	(South Africa) D Adams (Russia) A Olhovskiy	4	6	6

Quarterfinals
(Venezuela) M Ruah (Australia) S Stolle	5	4
(Canada) S Lareau (Canada) D Nestor	7	6
3	(Sweden) J Björkman (Australia) P Rafter	6	7
(Austria) A Antonitsch (Netherlands) J Siemerink	3	5
(United States) J Grabb (New Zealand) B Steven	6	6
4	(United Kingdom) J Bates (Argentina) J Frana	1	4
WC	(Denmark) K Carlsen (United States) I Lendl	6	6
2	(South Africa) D Adams (Russia) A Olhovskiy	2	3

Semifinals
(Canada) S Lareau (Canada) D Nestor	6	4
3	(Sweden) J Björkman (Australia) P Rafter	7	6
(United States) J Grabb (New Zealand) B Steven	6	6
WC	(Denmark) K Carlsen (United States) I Lendl	3	3

Final
3	(Sweden) J Björkman (Australia) P Rafter
(United States) J Grabb (New Zealand) B Steven	w/o
