= 1996 Salem Open =

- Date: 8–14 April
- Edition: 21st
- Category: World Series
- Draw: 32S / 16D
- Prize money: $303,000
- Surface: Hard / outdoor
- Location: Hong Kong, Hong Kong

Champions

Singles
- (United States) Pete Sampras

Doubles
- (United States) Patrick Galbraith / (Russia) Andrei Olhovskiy
- Hong Kong Open

The 1996 Salem Open was a men's tennis tournament played on outdoor hard courts on Hong Kong Island in Hong Kong and was part of the World Series of the 1996 ATP Tour. It was the 21st edition of the tournament and was held from 8 April through 14 April 1996. First-seeded Pete Sampras won the singles title.

== Finals ==
=== Singles ===
(United States) Pete Sampras defeated (United States) Michael Chang 6–4, 3–6, 6–4

- It was Sampras' 3rd title of the year and the 52nd of his career.

=== Doubles ===
(United States) Patrick Galbraith / (Russia) Andrei Olhovskiy defeated (United States) Kent Kinnear / (United States) Dave Randall 6–3, 6–7, 7–6

- It was Galbraith's 2nd title of the year and the 28th of his career. It was Olhovskiy's 3rd title of the year and the 15th of his career.
