= 1997 Salem Open – Singles =

Singles
- 1997 Salem Open

Final
- Champion: (United States) Michael Chang
- Runner-up: (Australia) Patrick Rafter
- Score: 6–3, 6–3

Details
- Draw: 32 (3WC/4Q)
- Seeds: 8

Events
Singles	Doubles
← 1996 ·	Hong Kong Open	· 1998 →

Pete Sampras was the defending champion, but did not compete this year.

Michael Chang won the title by defeating Patrick Rafter 6–3, 6–3 in the final.

== Seeds ==
1. (United States) Michael Chang (champion)
2. (Switzerland) Marc Rosset (second round)
3. (Australia) Todd Woodbridge (quarterfinals)
4. (Sweden) Thomas Johansson (semifinals)
5. (Australia) Patrick Rafter (final)
6. (Czech Republic) Martin Damm (first round)
7. (Germany) David Prinosil (quarterfinals)
8. (Czech Republic) Daniel Vacek (second round)

== Draw ==
=== Key ===
- Q = Qualifier
- WC = Wild card
- LL = Lucky loser
- Alt = Alternate
- SE = Special exempt
- PR = Protected ranking
- ITF = ITF entry
- JE = Junior exempt
- w/o = Walkover
- r = Retired
- d = Defaulted
- SR = Special ranking

=== Finals ===
Semifinals
1	(United States) Michael Chang	7^{7}	6
4	(Sweden) Thomas Johansson	6^{5}	4
5	(Australia) Patrick Rafter	3	6	3
Q	(United States) Brian MacPhie	6	1	0^{r}

Final
1	(United States) Michael Chang	6	6
5	(Australia) Patrick Rafter	3	3

=== Top half ===
First round
1	(United States) M Chang	6	6
WC	(Hong Kong) M Tong	0	1
(United States) J Tarango	3	7^{7}	6
(Russia) A Cherkasov	6	6^{4}	0
(Canada) D Nestor	6^{5}	6^{6}
(France) G Raoux	7^{7}	7^{8}
Q	(Australia) J Eagle	2	2
7	(Germany) D Prinosil	6	6
4	(Sweden) T Johansson	4	6	6
(France) S Simian	6	2	4
(United States) M Joyce	6	3	5
WC	(United States) J Grabb	3	6	7
(United States) J Gimelstob	1	7^{7}	6
(Sweden) H Holm	6	6^{1}	2
(South Africa) N Godwin	6	6
6	(Czech Republic) M Damm	4	3

Second round
1	(United States) M Chang	6	4	6
(United States) J Tarango	4	6	1
(France) G Raoux	4^{r}
7	(Germany) D Prinosil	3
4	(Sweden) T Johansson	6	6
WC	(United States) J Grabb	1	2
(United States) J Gimelstob	7	6
(South Africa) N Godwin	5	4

Quarterfinals
1	(United States) M Chang	6	7^{7}
7	(Germany) D Prinosil	1	6^{5}
4	(Sweden) T Johansson	6	6
(United States) J Gimelstob	4	4

Semifinals
1	(United States) M Chang	7^{7}	6
4	(Sweden) T Johansson	6^{5}	4

=== Bottom half ===
First round
5	(Australia) P Rafter	2	7^{7}	6
(Australia) M Woodforde	6	6^{5}	4
Q	(Germany) C Arriens	7	6^{11}	6
(Russia) A Olhovskiy	5	7^{13}	2
Q	(United Kingdom) D Sapsford	6^{5}	6	6
(United States) D Flach	7^{7}	2	0
(Japan) S Matsuoka	1	4
3	(Australia) T Woodbridge	6	6
8	(Czech Republic) D Vacek	6	7^{7}
(Russia) A Volkov	4	6^{3}
(Canada) S Lareau	6	6
(Czech Republic) D Škoch	4	0
WC	(United States) C Chang	0	4
Q	(United States) B MacPhie	6	6
(Germany) N Kiefer	2	2
2	(Switzerland) M Rosset	6	6

Second round
5	(Australia) P Rafter	4	7^{7}	6
Q	(Germany) C Arriens	6	6^{3}	3
Q	(United Kingdom) D Sapsford	1	6	1
3	(Australia) T Woodbridge	6	3	6
8	(Czech Republic) D Vacek	1	6^{3}
(Canada) S Lareau	6	7^{7}
Q	(United States) B MacPhie	7^{7}	6
2	(Switzerland) M Rosset	6^{2}	2

Quarterfinals
5	(Australia) P Rafter	6	6
3	(Australia) T Woodbridge	3	1
(Canada) S Lareau	3	3
Q	(United States) B MacPhie	6	6

Semifinals
5	(Australia) P Rafter	3	6	3
Q	(United States) B MacPhie	6	1	0^{r}
