= 1994 Internazionali di Carisbo – Doubles =

Doubles
- 1994 Internazionali di Carisbo

Final
- Champions: (Australia) John Fitzgerald (Australia) Patrick Rafter
- Runners-up: (Czech Republic) Vojtěch Flégl (Australia) Andrew Florent
- Score: 6–3, 6–3

Details
- Draw: 16 (2WC/1Q)
- Seeds: 4

Events
Singles	Doubles
- Bologna Outdoor

Danie Visser and Laurie Warder were the defending champions, but none competed this year.

John Fitzgerald and Patrick Rafter won the title by defeating Vojtěch Flégl and Andrew Florent 6–3, 6–3 in the final.

== Seeds ==
1. (United States) Scott Melville / (South Africa) Piet Norval (quarterfinals)
2. (United States) Brad Pearce / (United States) Dave Randall (first round)
3. (Australia) John Fitzgerald / (Australia) Patrick Rafter (champions)
4. (United States) Donald Johnson / (United States) Bryan Shelton (first round)

== Draw ==
Key

- Q = Qualifier
- WC = Wild card
- LL = Lucky loser
- Alt = Alternate
- ITF = ITF entry
- PR = Protected ranking
- SR = Special ranking
- SE = Special exempt
- JE = Junior exempt
- JR = Junior Accelerator Programme entrant
- CO = College Accelerator Programme entrant
- NG = Next Gen Accelerator Program entrant
- w/o = Walkover
- r = Retired
- d = Defaulted

=== Draw ===
First round
1	(United States) S Melville (South Africa) P Norval	4	7	6
(Italy) C Brandi (Italy) F Mordegan	6	5	4
(South Africa) JL de Jager (Zimbabwe) K Ullyett	4	6	5
(South Africa) B Haygarth (Belgium) L Pimek	6	2	7
3	(Australia) J Fitzgerald (Australia) P Rafter	5	6	6
WC	(Italy) O Camporese (Italy) S Pescosolido	7	3	3
(South Africa) R Deppe (United States) TJ Middleton	0	0
(Argentina) P Albano (Argentina) J Garat	6	6
(United States) S Cannon (Australia) D Macpherson	6	7
(Sweden) R Bergh (United States) T Kronemann	4	6
(South Africa) E Ferreira (United States) M Keil	7	7
4	(United States) D Johnson (United States) B Shelton	5	6
(United States) M Jensen (Germany) CU Steeb	6	4
Q	(Czech Republic) V Flégl (Australia) A Florent	7	6
WC	(Italy) A Gaudenzi (Spain) E Sánchez	7	4	6
2	(United States) B Pearce (United States) D Randall	6	6	1

Quarterfinals
1	(United States) S Melville (South Africa) P Norval	6	6	6
(South Africa) B Haygarth (Belgium) L Pimek	7	3	7
3	(Australia) J Fitzgerald (Australia) P Rafter	7	6
(Argentina) P Albano (Argentina) J Garat	6	3
(United States) S Cannon (Australia) D Macpherson	7	6
(South Africa) E Ferreira (United States) M Keil	6	3
Q	(Czech Republic) V Flégl (Australia) A Florent	4	6	7
WC	(Italy) A Gaudenzi (Spain) E Sánchez	6	4	5

Semifinals
(South Africa) B Haygarth (Belgium) L Pimek	6	6	3
3	(Australia) J Fitzgerald (Australia) P Rafter	7	3	6
(United States) S Cannon (Australia) D Macpherson	3	4
Q	(Czech Republic) V Flégl (Australia) A Florent	6	6

Final
3	(Australia) J Fitzgerald (Australia) P Rafter	6	6
Q	(Czech Republic) V Flégl (Australia) A Florent	3	3
