= Massimo Calvelli =

Italian sports executive and ceo of AC Milan

- Country (sports): Italy
- Born: 16 November 1974 (age 51) Montevarchi, Italy
- Height: 6 ft 0 in (183 cm)
- Plays: Right-handed
- Prize money: $14,375

Singles
- Career record: 1–1 (ATP Tour)
- Highest ranking: No. 255 (12 June 1995)

Grand Slam singles results
- US Open: Q1 (1995)
Massimo Calvelli
- Education: University of Florence
Medal record
Summer Universiade
Bronze medal – third place	1997 Sicily	Men's doubles

Massimo Calvelli (born 16 November 1974) is an Italian sports executive and former professional tennis player. He currently serves as the chief executive officer of the Italian football club AC Milan and previously was the CEO of the Association of Tennis Professionals.

== Early life and education ==
Born in Montevarchi, Calvelli completed his graduation degree in Law from the University of Florence.

== Tennis career ==
He was an Italian World Youth Cup representative in his junior career and made the boys' singles semi-finals of the 1991 Australian Open. Calvelli turned professional in 1992 and competed briefly on the international tour, reaching a best singles ranking of 255 in the world. Most notably he featured in the main draw of the Bologna ATP Tour tournament in 1995 and won his first round match over world number 56 Vincent Spadea.

== Corporate career ==
From 2020 to 2025 he was the chief executive officer of the Association of Tennis Professionals.

After his departure from ATP in 2025, in June 2026 he was appointed chief executive officer of Italian football club AC Milan.
