= 1994 Salem Open – Singles =

Singles
- 1994 Salem Open

Final
- Champion: (United States) Michael Chang
- Runner-up: (Australia) Patrick Rafter
- Score: 6–1, 6–3

Details
- Draw: 32 (3WC/4Q)
- Seeds: 8

Events
| Singles | Doubles |
- Hong Kong Open

Pete Sampras was the defending champion but did not compete this year, choosing to rest after his last title at Tokyo.

Michael Chang won the title by defeating Patrick Rafter 6–1, 6–3 in the final.

== Seeds ==
1. (United States) Michael Chang (champion)
2. (United States) Ivan Lendl (semifinals)
3. (United States) Brad Gilbert (semifinals)
4. (Australia) Patrick Rafter (final)
5. (United States) Aaron Krickstein (second round)
6. (United States) Jonathan Stark (first round)
7. (Israel) Amos Mansdorf (second round)
8. (Canada) Greg Rusedski (quarterfinals)

== Draw ==
Key

- Q = Qualifier
- WC = Wild card
- LL = Lucky loser
- Alt = Alternate
- ITF = ITF entry
- PR = Protected ranking
- SR = Special ranking
- SE = Special exempt
- JE = Junior exempt
- JR = Junior Accelerator Programme entrant
- CO = College Accelerator Programme entrant
- NG = Next Gen Accelerator Program entrant
- w/o = Walkover
- r = Retired
- d = Defaulted

=== Finals ===
Semifinals
1 | (United States) Michael Chang | 6 | 7
3 | (United States) Brad Gilbert | 2 | 5
4 | (Australia) Patrick Rafter | 6 | 6
2 | (United States) Ivan Lendl | 3 | 4

Final
1 | (United States) Michael Chang | 6 | 6
4 | (Australia) Patrick Rafter | 1 | 3

=== Top half ===
First round
1 | (United States) M Chang | 6 | 6
(United States) D Wheaton | 3 | 3
(Italy) O Camporese | 6 | 6
(Argentina) J Frana | 4 | 3
(Sweden) J Björkman | 2 | 3
Q | (Australia) M Tebbutt | 6 | 6
(Zimbabwe) B Black | 4 | 3
7 | (Israel) A Mansdorf | 6 | 6
3 | (United States) B Gilbert | 7 | 4 | 6
(France) G Raoux | 5 | 6 | 2
(United States) C Adams | 6 | 6
Q | (Australia) S Stolle | 3 | 4
(Australia) J Morgan | 6 | 6
Q | (Italy) G Pozzi | 3 | 4
(United States) J Tarango | 6 | 6
6 | (United States) J Stark | 2 | 3

Second round
1 | (United States) M Chang | 6 | 6
(Italy) O Camporese | 3 | 3
Q | (Australia) M Tebbutt | 6 | 7
7 | (Israel) A Mansdorf | 2 | 5
3 | (United States) B Gilbert | 7^{7} | 6
(United States) C Adams | 6^{1} | 2
(Australia) J Morgan | 6 | 6
(United States) J Tarango | 1 | 3

Quarterfinals
1 | (United States) M Chang | 6 | 6
Q | (Australia) M Tebbutt | 3 | 4
3 | (United States) B Gilbert | 6 | 7^{8}
(Australia) J Morgan | 2 | 6^{6}

Semifinals
1 | (United States) M Chang | 6 | 7
3 | (United States) B Gilbert | 2 | 5

=== Bottom half ===
First round
5 | (United States) A Krickstein | 6 | 6
(Austria) A Antonitsch | 2 | 2
(Czech Republic) M Damm | 6 | 6
WC | (South Korea) E-j Chang | 1 | 2
WC | (Japan) S Matsuoka | 7 | 6
(Venezuela) M Ruah | 5 | 4
(Netherlands) J Siemerink | 6 | 3 | 4
4 | (Australia) P Rafter | 2 | 6 | 6
8 | (Canada) G Rusedski | 4 | 6 | 6
Q | (Australia) N Borwick | 6 | 3 | 3
(Germany) J Renzenbrink | 6 | 6
(France) S Simian | 3 | 2
(New Zealand) B Steven | 6 | 6^{2} | 4
(Russia) A Olhovskiy | 3 | 7^{7} | 6
WC | (Canada) A Chang | 3 | 4
2 | (United States) I Lendl | 6 | 6

Second round
5 | (United States) A Krickstein | 6^{5} | 7 | 3
(Czech Republic) M Damm | 7^{7} | 5 | 6
WC | (Japan) S Matsuoka | 3 | 6^{2}
4 | (Australia) P Rafter | 6 | 7^{7}
8 | (Canada) G Rusedski | 5 | 6 | 6
(Germany) J Renzenbrink | 7 | 2 | 4
(Russia) A Olhovskiy | 3 | 6 | 1
2 | (United States) I Lendl | 6 | 3 | 6

Quarterfinals
(Czech Republic) M Damm | 6 | 3 | 4
4 | (Australia) P Rafter | 4 | 6 | 6
8 | (Canada) G Rusedski | 6 | 5 | 3
2 | (United States) I Lendl | 3 | 7 | 6

Semifinals
4 | (Australia) P Rafter | 6 | 6
2 | (United States) I Lendl | 3 | 4
