= 1995 Salem Open – Doubles =

Doubles
- 1995 Salem Open

Final
- Champions: (United States) Tommy Ho (Australia) Mark Philippoussis
- Runners-up: (Australia) John Fitzgerald (Sweden) Anders Järryd
- Score: 6–1, 6–7^{(2–7)}, 7–6^{(7–3)}

Details
- Draw: 16 (3WC/1Q)
- Seeds: 4

Events
Singles	Doubles
- Hong Kong Open

Jim Grabb and Brett Steven were the defending champions, but Steven chose to compete at Bermuda during the same week. Steven teamed up with Jonathan Stark and lost in the semi-finals to John Fitzgerald and Anders Järryd.

Tommy Ho and Mark Philippoussis won the title by defeating Fitzgerald and Järryd 6–1, 6–7^{(2–7)}, 7–6^{(7–3)} in the final.

== Seeds ==
1. (Sweden) Jan Apell / (Sweden) Jonas Björkman (semi-finals, withdrew)
2. (United States) Jim Grabb / (United States) Jonathan Stark (semi-finals, withdrew)
3. (Australia) John Fitzgerald / (Sweden) Anders Järryd (final)
4. (Czech Republic) Martin Damm / (Netherlands) Jan Siemerink (first round)

== Draw ==
Key

- Q = Qualifier
- WC = Wild card
- LL = Lucky loser
- Alt = Alternate
- ITF = ITF entry
- PR = Protected ranking
- SR = Special ranking
- SE = Special exempt
- JE = Junior exempt
- JR = Junior Accelerator Programme entrant
- CO = College Accelerator Programme entrant
- NG = Next Gen Accelerator Program entrant
- w/o = Walkover
- r = Retired
- d = Defaulted

=== Draw ===
First round
1	(Sweden) J Apell (Sweden) J Björkman	6	6
(South Africa) M Ondruska (South Africa) G Stafford	4	2
(United States) K Jones (United States) D Pate	6	6
(United States) J Courier (Switzerland) J Hlasek	4	2
4	(Czech Republic) M Damm (Netherlands) J Siemerink	4	6	6
(Netherlands) HJ Davids (Netherlands) S Noteboom	6	3	7
(United States) M Keil (Sweden) P Nyborg	6	3	6
WC	(United States) T Ho (Australia) M Philippoussis	3	6	7
WC	(United Kingdom) J Bates (Germany) A Mronz	6	6
(United States) J Pugh (United States) J Tarango	4	3
Q	(Mexico) L Herrera (Italy) L Tieleman	6	0	3
3	(Australia) J Fitzgerald (Sweden) A Järryd	4	6	6
WC	(Sweden) T Enqvist (Canada) G Rusedski	7	6	4
(United States) S Davis (United States) B MacPhie	6	7	6
(Sweden) H Holm (Canada) S Lareau	2	3
2	(United States) J Grabb (United States) J Stark	6	6

Quarter-finals
1	(Sweden) J Apell (Sweden) J Björkman	6	6
(United States) K Jones (United States) D Pate	3	3
(Netherlands) HJ Davids (Netherlands) S Noteboom	4	6	3
WC	(United States) T Ho (Australia) M Philippoussis	6	3	6
WC	(United Kingdom) J Bates (Germany) A Mronz	2	6
3	(Australia) J Fitzgerald (Sweden) A Järryd	6	7
(United States) S Davis (United States) B MacPhie	3	7	4
2	(United States) J Grabb (United States) J Stark	6	6	6

Semi-finals
1	(Sweden) J Apell (Sweden) J Björkman
WC	(United States) T Ho (Australia) M Philippoussis	w/o
3	(Australia) J Fitzgerald (Sweden) A Järryd	w/o
2	(United States) J Grabb (United States) J Stark

Final
WC	(United States) T Ho (Australia) M Philippoussis	6	6^{2}	7^{7}
3	(Australia) J Fitzgerald (Sweden) A Järryd	1	7^{7}	6^{3}
