= 1994 Salem Open =

- Date: 11–17 April
- Edition: 19th
- Category: World Series
- Draw: 32S / 16D
- Prize money: $295,000
- Surface: Hard / outdoor
- Location: Hong Kong, Hong Kong

Champions

Singles
- (United States) Michael Chang

Doubles
- (United States) Jim Grabb / (New Zealand) Brett Steven
- Hong Kong Open

The 1994 Salem Open was a men's tennis tournament played on outdoor hard courts on Hong Kong Island in Hong Kong that was part of the World Series of the 1994 ATP Tour. It was the 19th edition of the tournament and was held from 11 April through 17 April 1994. First-seeded Michael Chang won the singles title.

== Finals ==
=== Singles ===
(United States) Michael Chang defeated (Australia) Patrick Rafter 6–1, 6–3

- It was Chang's 3rd singles title of the year and the 16th of his career.

=== Doubles ===
(United States) Jim Grabb / (New Zealand) Brett Steven defeated (Sweden) Jonas Björkman / (Australia) Patrick Rafter walkover

- It was Grabb's 1st doubles title of the year and the 15th of his career. It was Steven's 1st doubles title of the year and the 2nd of his career.
