= Hawaii Open =

Tournament information
- Tour: Grand Prix circuit
- Founded: 1974
- Abolished: 1984
- Editions: 11
- Location: Maui or Honolulu, Hawaii
- Surface: Hard / outdoor (1974–1983); Carpet / indoor (1984)

Seiko Super Tennis was the 1984 name of a men's professional tennis tournament played in Maui or Honolulu, Hawaii from 1974 through 1984 that was part of the Grand Prix circuit . It was played on outdoor hard courts in Maui every year except 1984, when it was played on indoor carpet courts at the Blaisdell Arena in Honolulu.

== Results ==
=== Singles ===
Year	Champions	Runners-up	Score
1974	(Australia) John Newcombe	(United States) Roscoe Tanner	7–6, 7–6
1975	(United States) Jimmy Connors	(United States) Sandy Mayer	6–1, 6–0
1976	(United States) Harold Solomon	(United States) Robert Lutz	6–3, 5–7, 7–5
1977	(United States) Jimmy Connors	(United States) Brian Gottfried	6–2, 6–0
1978	(United States) Bill Scanlon	(United States) Peter Fleming	6–2, 6–0
1979	(United States) Bill Scanlon	(United States) Peter Fleming	6–1, 6–1
1980	(United States) Eliot Teltscher	(United States) Tim Wilkison	7–6, 6–3
1981	(United States) Hank Pfister	(United States) Tim Mayotte	6–4, 6–4
1982	(Australia) John Fitzgerald	(United States) Brian Teacher	6–2, 6–3
1983	(United States) Scott Davis	(United States) Vincent Van Patten	6–3, 6–7, 7–6
1984	(United States) Marty Davis	(United States) David Pate	6–1, 6–2

=== Doubles ===
Year	Champions	Runners-up	Score
1974	(United States) Dick Stockton (United States) Roscoe Tanner	(Australia) Owen Davidson (Australia) John Newcombe	6–3, 7–6
1975	(United States) Fred McNair (United States) Sherwood Stewart	(United States) Jeff Borowiak (Pakistan) Haroon Rahim	3–6, 7–6, 6–3
1976	(South Africa) Raymond Moore (Australia) Allan Stone	(United States) Dick Stockton (United States) Roscoe Tanner	6–7, 6–3, 6–4
1977	(United States) Robert Lutz (United States) Stan Smith	(United States) Brian Gottfried (Mexico) Raúl Ramírez	7–6, 6–4
1978	(United States) Tim Gullikson (United States) Tom Gullikson	(United States) Peter Fleming (United States) John McEnroe	7–6, 7–6
1979	(United Kingdom) John Lloyd (United States) Nick Saviano	(Australia) Rod Frawley (Paraguay) Francisco González	7–5, 6–4
1980	(United States) Peter Fleming (United States) John McEnroe	(United States) Victor Amaya (United States) Hank Pfister	7–6, 6–7, 6–2
1981	(United States) Tony Graham (United States) Matt Mitchell	(Australia) John Alexander (United States) James Delaney	6–3, 3–6, 7–6
1982	(United States) Mike Cahill (United States) Eliot Teltscher	(Paraguay) Francisco González (South Africa) Bernard Mitton	6–4, 6–4
1983	(United States) Tony Giammalva (United States) Steve Meister	(United States) Mike Bauer (United States) Scott Davis	6–3, 5–7, 6–4
1984	(United States) Gary Donnelly (United States) Butch Walts	(United States) Mark Dickson (United States) Mike Leach	7–6, 6–4
