= 2002 ATP Tour =

Men's tennis circuit

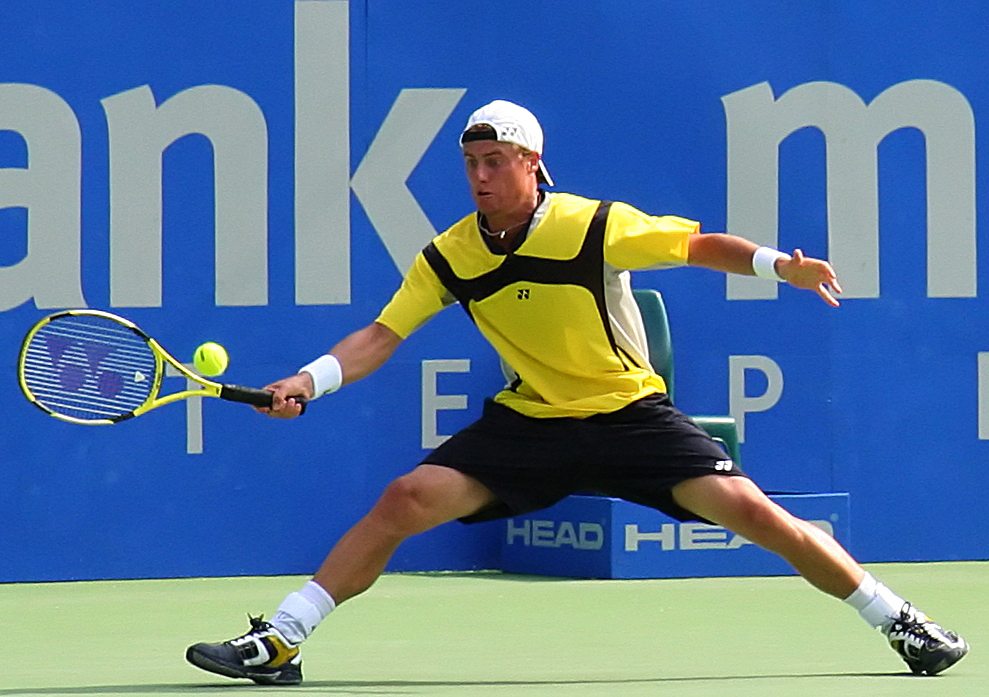
- Lleyton Hewitt finished the year ranked world No. 1 for the second time in his career. He won five tournaments during the season, including a major title at the Wimbledon Championships, as well as the Tennis Masters Cup.

Details
- Duration: 29 December 2001 – 17 November 2002
- Edition: 33rd
- Tournaments: 67

Achievements (singles)
- Most titles: (Australia) Lleyton Hewitt (5) (United States) Andre Agassi (5)
- Most finals: (Australia) Lleyton Hewitt (7) (United States) Andre Agassi (7)
- Prize money leader: (Australia) Lleyton Hewitt ($4,619,386)
- Points leader: (Australia) Lleyton Hewitt (4,485)

Awards
- Player of the year: (Australia) Lleyton Hewitt
- Doubles team of the year: (The Bahamas) Mark Knowles (Canada) Daniel Nestor
- Most improved player of the year: (Thailand) Paradorn Srichaphan
- Newcomer of the year: (France) Paul-Henri Mathieu
- Comeback player of the year: (Netherlands) Richard Krajicek

The 2002 ATP Tour was the global elite men's professional tennis circuit organised by the Association of Tennis Professionals (ATP) for the 2002 tennis season. The ATP Tour is the elite tour for professional tennis organised by the ATP. The ATP Tour includes the four Grand Slam tournaments, the Tennis Masters Cup, the ATP Masters Series, the International Series Gold and the International Series tournaments.

This season marked the most recent occasion where eight different men appeared in the four major singles finals of a calendar year.

== Season summary ==
The season saw Pete Sampras win his 14th Grand Slam singles title, breaking his own record of 13 in the process, by defeating longtime rival Andre Agassi 6–3, 6–4, 5–7, 6–4 in the final of the US Open. This would be Sampras’s last tournament before retirement with him officially announcing his retirement at the next year's US Open. Sampras finished up with a 20–14 lead over Agassi in head to head, ending a rivalry that defined the 1990’s and early 2000’s in tennis.

Young Australian Lleyton Hewitt ended the year No. 1 for the second season in a row, having captured his second Grand Slam title at Wimbledon by defeating David Nalbandian in a crushing straight set victory. Hewitt captured 5 titles in 2002 overall, including winning the title at the Indian Wells Masters and then successfully defending the title at the Tennis Masters Cup by defeating Juan Carlos Ferrero 7–5, 7–5, 2–6, 2–6, 6–4 in the final.

Despite not winning a Grand Slam in 2002, Andre Agassi would win multiple ATP Masters Series events by capturing the title in Miami, Rome and at the first edition of the Madrid Masters. He won 5 titles overall throughout 2002 and ended the year ranked world No. 2. Swede Thomas Johansson won his maiden and only Grand Slam title by defeating Marat Safin in the final of the Australian Open from a set down 3–6, 6–4, 6–4, 7–6^{(7–4)}. The tournament had been rife with upsets that saw no top 6 seed reach the quarterfinals and saw both top 2 seeds Lleyton Hewitt and Gustavo Kuerten lose in their first round matches. Albert Costa also became a maiden Grand Slam champion after he defeated fellow Spaniard Juan Carlos Ferrero 6–1, 6–0, 4–6, 6–3 in the final of the French Open. Like Johansson, he would also never win another Grand Slam title after this.

2002 saw the emergence of future 20-time Grand Slam champion Roger Federer as a top 10 player. The young Swiss won his first Masters Series title in Hamburg by defeating Marat Safin in the final in straight sets. Federer would go on to end the year as world no. 6. Safin would also have a strong season, bouncing back inside the top 3 after dropping out of the top 10 of the ATP rankings in 2001. Having reached the Australian Open final, Safin would reach the semifinals of the French Open and win the Paris Masters. Youngster Juan Carlos Ferrero also solidified himself as a top player, ending the year inside the top 5 for the second season in a row. Jiří Novák, Tim Henman, Albert Costa and Andy Roddick rounded out the year-end top 10.

Russia won the 2002 Davis Cup title after beating France 3–2. Mikhail Youzhny defeated Paul-Henri Mathieu from 2 sets down in the final rubber to give Russia their first Davis Cup title.

== Schedule ==
The table below shows the 2002 ATP Tour schedule.

Key

Grand Slam
Tennis Masters Cup
Tennis Masters Series
ATP International Series Gold
ATP International Series
Team Events

=== January ===
Week	Tournament	Champions	Runners-up	Semifinalists	Quarterfinalists
31 Dec 2001	Hopman Cup; Perth, Australia; ITF Mixed Team Championships; Hard (i) – 8 teams (RR)	Spain; 2–1	United States	Round Robin losers (Group A) Australia; Switzerland; Argentina	Round Robin losers (Group B) Italy; Belgium; France
31 Dec 2001	2002 AAPT Championships; Adelaide, Australia; ATP International Series $357,000 – hard Singles – Doubles	(United Kingdom) Tim Henman; 6–4, 6–7^{(6–8)}, 6–3	(Australia) Mark Philippoussis	(Spain) Alberto Martín (Morocco) Hicham Arazi	(United Kingdom) Greg Rusedski (Sweden) Thomas Enqvist (Croatia) Ivan Ljubičić (United States) Todd Martin
31 Dec 2001	2002 AAPT Championships; Adelaide, Australia; ATP International Series $357,000 – hard Singles – Doubles	(Zimbabwe) Wayne Black (Zimbabwe) Kevin Ullyett; 7–5, 6–2	(United States) Bob Bryan (United States) Mike Bryan	(Spain) Alberto Martín (Morocco) Hicham Arazi	(United Kingdom) Greg Rusedski (Sweden) Thomas Enqvist (Croatia) Ivan Ljubičić (United States) Todd Martin
31 Dec 2001	2002 Tata Open; Chennai, India; ATP International Series $400,000 – hard Singles – Doubles	(Argentina) Guillermo Cañas; 6–4, 7–6^{(7–2)}	(Thailand) Paradorn Srichaphan	(Slovakia) Karol Kučera (Romania) Andrei Pavel	(Czech Republic) Jiří Vaněk (France) Fabrice Santoro (Spain) Álex Calatrava (Sweden) Thomas Johansson
31 Dec 2001	2002 Tata Open; Chennai, India; ATP International Series $400,000 – hard Singles – Doubles	(India) Mahesh Bhupathi (India) Leander Paes; 5–7, 6–2, 7–5	(Czech Republic) Tomáš Cibulec (Czech Republic) Ota Fukárek	(Slovakia) Karol Kučera (Romania) Andrei Pavel	(Czech Republic) Jiří Vaněk (France) Fabrice Santoro (Spain) Álex Calatrava (Sweden) Thomas Johansson
31 Dec 2001	2002 Qatar ExxonMobil Open; Doha, Qatar; ATP International Series $1,000,000 – hard Singles – Doubles	(Morocco) Younes El Aynaoui; 4–6, 6–2, 6–2	(Spain) Félix Mantilla	(Germany) Rainer Schüttler (Czech Republic) Bohdan Ulihrach	(Russia) Yevgeny Kafelnikov (Czech Republic) Jiří Novák (Spain) Fernando Vicente (Czech Republic) Radek Štěpánek
31 Dec 2001	2002 Qatar ExxonMobil Open; Doha, Qatar; ATP International Series $1,000,000 – hard Singles – Doubles	(United States) Donald Johnson (United States) Jared Palmer; 6–3, 7–6^{(7–5)}	(Czech Republic) Jiří Novák (Czech Republic) David Rikl	(Germany) Rainer Schüttler (Czech Republic) Bohdan Ulihrach	(Russia) Yevgeny Kafelnikov (Czech Republic) Jiří Novák (Spain) Fernando Vicente (Czech Republic) Radek Štěpánek
7 Jan	2002 Heineken Open; Auckland, New Zealand; ATP International Series $357,000 – hard Singles – Doubles	(United Kingdom) Greg Rusedski; 6–7^{(0–7)}, 6–4, 7–5	(France) Jérôme Golmard	(Switzerland) Michel Kratochvil (Czech Republic) Jiří Novák	(Sweden) Jonas Björkman (Argentina) David Nalbandian (Spain) Félix Mantilla (Croatia) Goran Ivanišević
7 Jan	2002 Heineken Open; Auckland, New Zealand; ATP International Series $357,000 – hard Singles – Doubles	(Sweden) Jonas Björkman (Australia) Todd Woodbridge; 7–6^{(7–5)}, 7–6^{(9–7)}	(Argentina) Martín García (Czech Republic) Cyril Suk	(Switzerland) Michel Kratochvil (Czech Republic) Jiří Novák	(Sweden) Jonas Björkman (Argentina) David Nalbandian (Spain) Félix Mantilla (Croatia) Goran Ivanišević
7 Jan	2002 Adidas International; Sydney, Australia; ATP International Series $381,000 – hard Singles – Doubles	(Switzerland) Roger Federer; 6–3, 6–3	(Argentina) Juan Ignacio Chela	(Belarus) Max Mirnyi (United States) Andy Roddick	(France) Julien Boutter (France) Nicolas Escudé (South Korea) Hyung-Taik Lee (Chile) Marcelo Ríos
7 Jan	2002 Adidas International; Sydney, Australia; ATP International Series $381,000 – hard Singles – Doubles	(United States) Donald Johnson (United States) Jared Palmer; 6–4, 6–4	(Australia) Joshua Eagle (Australia) Sandon Stolle	(Belarus) Max Mirnyi (United States) Andy Roddick	(France) Julien Boutter (France) Nicolas Escudé (South Korea) Hyung-Taik Lee (Chile) Marcelo Ríos
14 Jan; 21 Jan	2002 Australian Open; Melbourne, Australia; Grand Slam $4,290,000 – hard 128S/128Q/64D/32X; Singles – Doubles – Mixed doubles	(Sweden) Thomas Johansson; 3–6, 6–4, 6–4, 7–6^{(7–4)}	(Russia) Marat Safin	(Germany) Tommy Haas (Czech Republic) Jiří Novák	(Chile) Marcelo Ríos (South Africa) Wayne Ferreira (Austria) Stefan Koubek (Sweden) Jonas Björkman
14 Jan; 21 Jan	2002 Australian Open; Melbourne, Australia; Grand Slam $4,290,000 – hard 128S/128Q/64D/32X; Singles – Doubles – Mixed doubles	(The Bahamas) Mark Knowles (Canada) Daniel Nestor'; 7–6^{(7–4)}, 6–3	(France) Michaël Llodra (France) Fabrice Santoro	(Germany) Tommy Haas (Czech Republic) Jiří Novák	(Chile) Marcelo Ríos (South Africa) Wayne Ferreira (Austria) Stefan Koubek (Sweden) Jonas Björkman
14 Jan; 21 Jan	2002 Australian Open; Melbourne, Australia; Grand Slam $4,290,000 – hard 128S/128Q/64D/32X; Singles – Doubles – Mixed doubles	(Zimbabwe) Kevin Ullyett (Slovakia) Daniela Hantuchová; 6–3, 6–2	(Argentina) Gastón Etlis (Argentina) Paola Suárez	(Germany) Tommy Haas (Czech Republic) Jiří Novák	(Chile) Marcelo Ríos (South Africa) Wayne Ferreira (Austria) Stefan Koubek (Sweden) Jonas Björkman
28 Jan	2002 Milan Indoor; Milan, Italy; ATP International Series $381,000 – carpet (i); Singles – Doubles	(Italy) Davide Sanguinetti; 7–6^{(7–2)}, 4–6, 6–1	(Switzerland) Roger Federer	(France) Nicolas Escudé (United Kingdom) Greg Rusedski	(Morocco) Younes El Aynaoui (Belarus) Max Mirnyi (Netherlands) Sjeng Schalken (Armenia) Sargis Sargsian
28 Jan	2002 Milan Indoor; Milan, Italy; ATP International Series $381,000 – carpet (i); Singles – Doubles	(Germany) Karsten Braasch (Russia) Andrei Olhovskiy; 3–6, 7–6^{(7–5)}, [12–10]	(France) Julien Boutter (Belarus) Max Mirnyi	(France) Nicolas Escudé (United Kingdom) Greg Rusedski	(Morocco) Younes El Aynaoui (Belarus) Max Mirnyi (Netherlands) Sjeng Schalken (Armenia) Sargis Sargsian

=== February ===
Week	Tournament	Champions	Runners-up	Semifinalists	Quarterfinalists
4 Feb	Davis Cup by BNP Paribas First Round; Metz, France – hard (i); Ostrava, Czech Republic – carpet (i); Zaragoza, Spain – clay (i); Oklahoma City, Oklahoma, USA – hard (i); Moscow, Russia – clay (i); Birmingham, Great Britain – carpet (i); Zagreb, Croatia – carpet (i); Buenos Aires, Argentina – clay	First-round winners France 3–2; Czech Republic 4–1; Spain 3–2; United States 5–0; Russia 3–2; Sweden 3–2; Croatia 4–1; Argentina 5–0	First-round losers Netherlands; Brazil; Morocco; Slovakia; Switzerland; Great Britain; Germany; Australia		
11 Feb	Copenhagen Open; Copenhagen, Denmark; ATP International Series $381,000 – hard (i); Singles – Doubles	(Germany) Lars Burgsmüller; 6–3, 6–3	(Belgium) Olivier Rochus	(Sweden) Magnus Larsson (Italy) Davide Sanguinetti	(Czech Republic) Jiří Novák (United States) Cecil Mamiit (Belgium) Christophe Rochus (Germany) Rainer Schüttler
11 Feb	Copenhagen Open; Copenhagen, Denmark; ATP International Series $381,000 – hard (i); Singles – Doubles	(Austria) Julian Knowle (Germany) Michael Kohlmann; 7–6^{(10–8)}, 7–5	(Czech Republic) Jiří Novák (Czech Republic) Radek Štěpánek	(Sweden) Magnus Larsson (Italy) Davide Sanguinetti	(Czech Republic) Jiří Novák (United States) Cecil Mamiit (Belgium) Christophe Rochus (Germany) Rainer Schüttler
11 Feb	Open 13; Marseille, France; ATP International Series $451,000 – Hard (i); Singles – Doubles	(Sweden) Thomas Enqvist; 6–7^{(4–7)}, 6–3, 6–1	(France) Nicolas Escudé	(France) Cédric Pioline (Russia) Yevgeny Kafelnikov	(Spain) Juan Carlos Ferrero (United Kingdom) Greg Rusedski (France) Sébastien Grosjean (Switzerland) Marc Rosset
11 Feb	Open 13; Marseille, France; ATP International Series $451,000 – Hard (i); Singles – Doubles	(France) Arnaud Clément (France) Nicolas Escudé; 6–4, 6–3	(France) Julien Boutter (Belarus) Max Mirnyi	(France) Cédric Pioline (Russia) Yevgeny Kafelnikov	(Spain) Juan Carlos Ferrero (United Kingdom) Greg Rusedski (France) Sébastien Grosjean (Switzerland) Marc Rosset
11 Feb	Bell South Open; Viña del Mar, Chile; ATP International Series $381,000 – clay Singles – Doubles	(Chile) Fernando González; 6–3, 6–7^{(5–7)}, 7–6^{(7–4)}	(Ecuador) Nicolás Lapentti	(Chile) Nicolás Massú (France) Nicolas Coutelot	(Brazil) Flávio Saretta (Spain) Albert Montañés (Austria) Markus Hipfl (Argentina) José Acasuso
11 Feb	Bell South Open; Viña del Mar, Chile; ATP International Series $381,000 – clay Singles – Doubles	(Argentina) Gastón Etlis (Argentina) Martín Rodríguez; 6–3, 6–4	(Argentina) Lucas Arnold Ker (Argentina) Luis Lobo	(Chile) Nicolás Massú (France) Nicolas Coutelot	(Brazil) Flávio Saretta (Spain) Albert Montañés (Austria) Markus Hipfl (Argentina) José Acasuso
18 Feb	Kroger St. Jude; Memphis, TN, USA; ATP International Series Gold $725,000 – hard (i); Singles – Doubles	(United States) Andy Roddick; 6–4, 3–6, 7–5	(United States) James Blake	(United States) Jan-Michael Gambill (Belgium) Xavier Malisse	(Germany) Tommy Haas (Germany) Rainer Schüttler (United States) Todd Martin (Armenia) Sargis Sargsian
18 Feb	Kroger St. Jude; Memphis, TN, USA; ATP International Series Gold $725,000 – hard (i); Singles – Doubles	(United States) Brian MacPhie (Federal Republic of Yugoslavia) Nenad Zimonjić; 6–3, 3–6, [10–4]	(United States) Bob Bryan (United States) Mike Bryan	(United States) Jan-Michael Gambill (Belgium) Xavier Malisse	(Germany) Tommy Haas (Germany) Rainer Schüttler (United States) Todd Martin (Armenia) Sargis Sargsian
18 Feb	ABN AMRO World Tennis Tournament; Rotterdam, Netherlands; ATP International Series Gold $713,000 – hard (i); Singles – Doubles	(France) Nicolas Escudé; 3–6, 7–6^{(9–7)}, 6–4	(United Kingdom) Tim Henman	(France) Sébastien Grosjean (Croatia) Ivan Ljubičić	(Switzerland) Roger Federer (France) Arnaud Clément (Czech Republic) Bohdan Ulihrach (Switzerland) Ivo Heuberger
18 Feb	ABN AMRO World Tennis Tournament; Rotterdam, Netherlands; ATP International Series Gold $713,000 – hard (i); Singles – Doubles	(Switzerland) Roger Federer (Belarus) Max Mirnyi; 4–6, 6–3, [10–4]	(The Bahamas) Mark Knowles (Canada) Daniel Nestor	(France) Sébastien Grosjean (Croatia) Ivan Ljubičić	(Switzerland) Roger Federer (France) Arnaud Clément (Czech Republic) Bohdan Ulihrach (Switzerland) Ivo Heuberger
18 Feb	Copa AT&T; Buenos Aires, Argentina; ATP International Series $425,000 – clay Singles – Doubles	(Chile) Nicolás Massú; 2–6, 7–6^{(7–5)}, 6–2	(Argentina) Agustín Calleri	(Argentina) Juan Ignacio Chela (Spain) Feliciano López	(Argentina) Mariano Zabaleta (Argentina) Franco Squillari (Argentina) José Acasuso (Argentina) David Nalbandian
18 Feb	Copa AT&T; Buenos Aires, Argentina; ATP International Series $425,000 – clay Singles – Doubles	(Argentina) Gastón Etlis (Argentina) Martín Rodríguez; 3–6, 6–3, [10–4]	(Sweden) Simon Aspelin (Australia) Mark Kratzmann	(Argentina) Juan Ignacio Chela (Spain) Feliciano López	(Argentina) Mariano Zabaleta (Argentina) Franco Squillari (Argentina) José Acasuso (Argentina) David Nalbandian
25 Feb	Abierto Mexicano Pegaso; Acapulco, Mexico; ATP International Series Gold $725,200 – clay Singles – Doubles	(Spain) Carlos Moyà; 7–6^{(7–4)}, 7–6^{(7–4)}	(Brazil) Fernando Meligeni	(Spain) Albert Montañés (Argentina) Juan Ignacio Chela	(Spain) Fernando Vicente (Argentina) Mariano Zabaleta (Spain) David Sánchez (Spain) Francisco Clavet
25 Feb	Abierto Mexicano Pegaso; Acapulco, Mexico; ATP International Series Gold $725,200 – clay Singles – Doubles	(United States) Bob Bryan (United States) Mike Bryan; 6–1, 3–6, [10–2]	(Czech Republic) Martin Damm (Czech Republic) David Rikl	(Spain) Albert Montañés (Argentina) Juan Ignacio Chela	(Spain) Fernando Vicente (Argentina) Mariano Zabaleta (Spain) David Sánchez (Spain) Francisco Clavet
25 Feb	Dubai Tennis Championships; Dubai, United Arab Emirates; ATP International Series Gold $925,000 – hard Singles – Doubles	(France) Fabrice Santoro; 6–4, 3–6, 6–3	(Morocco) Younes El Aynaoui	(Sweden) Thomas Johansson (Czech Republic) Jiří Novák	(Germany) Rainer Schüttler (United Kingdom) Tim Henman (Croatia) Ivan Ljubičić (Russia) Yevgeny Kafelnikov
25 Feb	Dubai Tennis Championships; Dubai, United Arab Emirates; ATP International Series Gold $925,000 – hard Singles – Doubles	(The Bahamas) Mark Knowles (Canada) Daniel Nestor; 3–6, 6–3, [13–11]	(Australia) Joshua Eagle (Australia) Sandon Stolle	(Sweden) Thomas Johansson (Czech Republic) Jiří Novák	(Germany) Rainer Schüttler (United Kingdom) Tim Henman (Croatia) Ivan Ljubičić (Russia) Yevgeny Kafelnikov
25 Feb	Siebel Open; San Jose, CA, USA; ATP International Series $400,000 – hard (i); Singles	(Australia) Lleyton Hewitt; 4–6, 7–6^{(8–6)}, 7–6^{(7–4)}	(United States) Andre Agassi	(United States) Jan-Michael Gambill (United States) Andy Roddick	(United States) Todd Martin (Australia) Wayne Arthurs (United States) James Blake (South Africa) Wayne Ferreira
25 Feb	Siebel Open; San Jose, CA, USA; ATP International Series $400,000 – hard (i); Singles	(Zimbabwe) Wayne Black (Zimbabwe) Kevin Ullyett; 6–3, 4–6, [10–5]	(South Africa) John-Laffnie de Jager (South Africa) Robbie Koenig	(United States) Jan-Michael Gambill (United States) Andy Roddick	(United States) Todd Martin (Australia) Wayne Arthurs (United States) James Blake (South Africa) Wayne Ferreira

=== March ===
Week	Tournament	Champions	Runners-up	Semifinalists	Quarterfinalists
4 Mar	2002 International Tennis Championships; Delray Beach, FL, USA; ATP International Series $400,000 – hard Singles – Doubles	(Italy) Davide Sanguinetti; 6–4, 4–6, 6–4	(United States) Andy Roddick	(France) Antony Dupuis (United States) Jan-Michael Gambill	(France) Michaël Llodra (Spain) Feliciano López (Thailand) Paradorn Srichaphan (Brazil) André Sá
4 Mar	2002 International Tennis Championships; Delray Beach, FL, USA; ATP International Series $400,000 – hard Singles – Doubles	(Czech Republic) Martin Damm (Czech Republic) Cyril Suk; 6–4, 6–7^{(5–7)}, [10–5]	(South Africa) David Adams (Australia) Ben Ellwood	(France) Antony Dupuis (United States) Jan-Michael Gambill	(France) Michaël Llodra (Spain) Feliciano López (Thailand) Paradorn Srichaphan (Brazil) André Sá
4 Mar	2002 Franklin Templeton Tennis Classic; Scottsdale, AZ, USA; ATP International Series $400,000 – hard Singles – Doubles	(United States) Andre Agassi; 6–2, 7–6^{(7–2)}	(Spain) Juan Balcells	(Belgium) Xavier Malisse (Germany) Rainer Schüttler	(Argentina) Juan Ignacio Chela (South Africa) Wayne Ferreira (Israel) Noam Okun (Spain) Carlos Moyà
4 Mar	2002 Franklin Templeton Tennis Classic; Scottsdale, AZ, USA; ATP International Series $400,000 – hard Singles – Doubles	(United States) Bob Bryan (United States) Mike Bryan; 7–5, 7–6^{(8–6)}	(The Bahamas) Mark Knowles (Canada) Daniel Nestor	(Belgium) Xavier Malisse (Germany) Rainer Schüttler	(Argentina) Juan Ignacio Chela (South Africa) Wayne Ferreira (Israel) Noam Okun (Spain) Carlos Moyà
11 Mar	2002 Pacific Life Open; Indian Wells, CA, USA; Tennis Masters Series $2,450,000 – hard Singles – Doubles	(Australia) Lleyton Hewitt; 6–1, 6–2	(United Kingdom) Tim Henman	(United States) Pete Sampras (United States) Todd Martin	(Sweden) Thomas Enqvist (Germany) Rainer Schüttler (Argentina) Gastón Gaudio (Russia) Yevgeny Kafelnikov
11 Mar	2002 Pacific Life Open; Indian Wells, CA, USA; Tennis Masters Series $2,450,000 – hard Singles – Doubles	(The Bahamas) Mark Knowles (Canada) Daniel Nestor; 6–4, 6–4	(Switzerland) Roger Federer (Belarus) Max Mirnyi	(United States) Pete Sampras (United States) Todd Martin	(Sweden) Thomas Enqvist (Germany) Rainer Schüttler (Argentina) Gastón Gaudio (Russia) Yevgeny Kafelnikov
18 Mar; 25 Mar	2002 NASDAQ-100 Open; Key Biscayne, FL, USA; Tennis Masters Series $3,075,000 – hard Singles – Doubles	(United States) Andre Agassi; 6–3, 6–3, 3–6, 6–4	(Switzerland) Roger Federer	(Australia) Lleyton Hewitt (Chile) Marcelo Ríos	(Russia) Marat Safin (Romania) Andrei Pavel (Argentina) Juan Ignacio Chela (Ecuador) Nicolás Lapentti
18 Mar; 25 Mar	2002 NASDAQ-100 Open; Key Biscayne, FL, USA; Tennis Masters Series $3,075,000 – hard Singles – Doubles	(The Bahamas) Mark Knowles (Canada) Daniel Nestor; 6–3, 3–6, 6–1	(United States) Donald Johnson (United States) Jared Palmer	(Australia) Lleyton Hewitt (Chile) Marcelo Ríos	(Russia) Marat Safin (Romania) Andrei Pavel (Argentina) Juan Ignacio Chela (Ecuador) Nicolás Lapentti

=== April ===
Week	Tournament	Champions	Runners-up	Semifinalists	Quarterfinalists
1 Apr	Davis Cup by BNP Paribas Quarterfinals; Pau, France – carpet (i); Houston, United States – grass Moscow, Russia – clay (i); Buenos Aires, Argentina – clay (red)	Quarterfinal winners France 3–1; United States 3–1; Russia 4–1; Argentina 4–1	Quarterfinal losers Czech Republic; Spain; Sweden; Croatia		
8 Apr	2002 Grand Prix Hassan II; Casablanca, Morocco; ATP International Series $400,000 – clay Singles – Doubles	(Morocco) Younes El Aynaoui; 3–6, 6–3, 6–2	(Argentina) Guillermo Cañas	(France) Julien Boutter (Russia) Mikhail Youzhny	(Hungary) Attila Sávolt (France) Jean-René Lisnard (France) Antony Dupuis (France) Paul-Henri Mathieu
8 Apr	2002 Grand Prix Hassan II; Casablanca, Morocco; ATP International Series $400,000 – clay Singles – Doubles	(Australia) Stephen Huss (South Africa) Myles Wakefield; 6–4, 6–2	(Argentina) Martín García (Argentina) Luis Lobo	(France) Julien Boutter (Russia) Mikhail Youzhny	(Hungary) Attila Sávolt (France) Jean-René Lisnard (France) Antony Dupuis (France) Paul-Henri Mathieu
8 Apr	2002 Estoril Open; Oeiras, Portugal; ATP International Series $525,000 – clay Singles – Doubles	(Argentina) David Nalbandian; 6–4, 7–6^{(7–5)}	(Finland) Jarkko Nieminen	(Spain) Carlos Moyà (Brazil) Fernando Meligeni	(Netherlands) Sjeng Schalken (Belarus) Max Mirnyi (Czech Republic) Radek Štěpánek (Russia) Marat Safin
8 Apr	2002 Estoril Open; Oeiras, Portugal; ATP International Series $525,000 – clay Singles – Doubles	(Germany) Karsten Braasch (Russia) Andrei Olhovskiy; 6–3, 6–3	(Sweden) Simon Aspelin (Australia) Andrew Kratzmann	(Spain) Carlos Moyà (Brazil) Fernando Meligeni	(Netherlands) Sjeng Schalken (Belarus) Max Mirnyi (Czech Republic) Radek Štěpánek (Russia) Marat Safin
15 Apr	2002 Monte Carlo Open; Roquebrune-Cap-Martin, France; Tennis Masters Series $2,328,000 – clay Singles – Doubles	(Spain) Juan Carlos Ferrero; 7–5, 6–3, 6–4	(Spain) Carlos Moyà	(United Kingdom) Tim Henman (France) Sébastien Grosjean	(Russia) Marat Safin (Sweden) Thomas Johansson (Spain) Albert Costa (Germany) Tommy Haas
15 Apr	2002 Monte Carlo Open; Roquebrune-Cap-Martin, France; Tennis Masters Series $2,328,000 – clay Singles – Doubles	(Sweden) Jonas Björkman (Australia) Todd Woodbridge; 6–3, 3–6, [10–7]	(Netherlands) Paul Haarhuis (Russia) Yevgeny Kafelnikov	(United Kingdom) Tim Henman (France) Sébastien Grosjean	(Russia) Marat Safin (Sweden) Thomas Johansson (Spain) Albert Costa (Germany) Tommy Haas
22 Apr	2002 Trofeo Conde de Godo; Barcelona, Spain; ATP International Series Gold $955,000 – clay Singles – Doubles	(Argentina) Gastón Gaudio; 6–4, 6–0, 6–2	(Spain) Albert Costa	(Australia) Lleyton Hewitt (Argentina) Guillermo Cañas	(Morocco) Younes El Aynaoui (Spain) Alberto Martín (France) Cédric Pioline (Spain) Àlex Corretja
22 Apr	2002 Trofeo Conde de Godo; Barcelona, Spain; ATP International Series Gold $955,000 – clay Singles – Doubles	(Australia) Michael Hill (Czech Republic) Daniel Vacek; 6–4, 6–4	(Argentina) Lucas Arnold Ker (Argentina) Gastón Etlis	(Australia) Lleyton Hewitt (Argentina) Guillermo Cañas	(Morocco) Younes El Aynaoui (Spain) Alberto Martín (France) Cédric Pioline (Spain) Àlex Corretja
22 Apr	2002 U.S. Men's Clay Court Championships; Houston, TX, USA; ATP International Series $400,000 – clay Singles – Doubles	(United States) Andy Roddick; 7–6^{(11–9)}, 6–3	(United States) Pete Sampras	(Argentina) Guillermo Coria (United States) Andre Agassi	(Australia) Wayne Arthurs (United States) James Blake (United States) Todd Martin (Denmark) Kristian Pless
22 Apr	2002 U.S. Men's Clay Court Championships; Houston, TX, USA; ATP International Series $400,000 – clay Singles – Doubles	(United States) Mardy Fish (United States) Andy Roddick; 6–4, 6–4	(United States) Jan-Michael Gambill (United States) Graydon Oliver	(Argentina) Guillermo Coria (United States) Andre Agassi	(Australia) Wayne Arthurs (United States) James Blake (United States) Todd Martin (Denmark) Kristian Pless
29 Apr	2002 Mallorca Open; Mallorca, Spain; ATP International Series $381,000 – clay Singles – Doubles	(Argentina) Gastón Gaudio; 6–2, 6–3	(Finland) Jarkko Nieminen	(Argentina) Agustín Calleri (Argentina) Mariano Zabaleta	(Brazil) Gustavo Kuerten (Belgium) Olivier Rochus (Slovakia) Dominik Hrbatý (Spain) David Sánchez
29 Apr	2002 Mallorca Open; Mallorca, Spain; ATP International Series $381,000 – clay Singles – Doubles	(India) Mahesh Bhupathi (India) Leander Paes; 6–2, 6–4	(Austria) Julian Knowle (Germany) Michael Kohlmann	(Argentina) Agustín Calleri (Argentina) Mariano Zabaleta	(Brazil) Gustavo Kuerten (Belgium) Olivier Rochus (Slovakia) Dominik Hrbatý (Spain) David Sánchez
29 Apr	2002 BMW Open; Munich, Germany; ATP International Series $381,000 – clay Singles – Doubles	(Morocco) Younes El Aynaoui; 6–4, 6–4	(Germany) Rainer Schüttler	(Czech Republic) Radek Štěpánek (Russia) Mikhail Youzhny	(Ecuador) Nicolás Lapentti (Spain) Francisco Clavet (France) Julien Boutter (Germany) Tommy Haas
29 Apr	2002 BMW Open; Munich, Germany; ATP International Series $381,000 – clay Singles – Doubles	(Czech Republic) Petr Luxa (Czech Republic) Radek Štěpánek; 6–0, 6–7^{(4–7)}, [11–9]	(Czech Republic) Petr Pála (Czech Republic) Pavel Vízner	(Czech Republic) Radek Štěpánek (Russia) Mikhail Youzhny	(Ecuador) Nicolás Lapentti (Spain) Francisco Clavet (France) Julien Boutter (Germany) Tommy Haas

=== May ===
Week	Tournament	Champions	Runners-up	Semifinalists	Quarterfinalists
6 May	2002 Rome Masters; Rome, Italy; Tennis Masters Series $2,328,000 – clay Singles – Doubles	(United States) Andre Agassi; 6–3, 6–3, 6–0	(Germany) Tommy Haas	(United States) Andy Roddick (Czech Republic) Jiří Novák	(Spain) Carlos Moyà (Spain) Tommy Robredo (United States) James Blake (Spain) Albert Costa
6 May	2002 Rome Masters; Rome, Italy; Tennis Masters Series $2,328,000 – clay Singles – Doubles	(Czech Republic) Martin Damm (Czech Republic) Cyril Suk; 7–5, 7–5	(Zimbabwe) Wayne Black (Zimbabwe) Kevin Ullyett	(United States) Andy Roddick (Czech Republic) Jiří Novák	(Spain) Carlos Moyà (Spain) Tommy Robredo (United States) James Blake (Spain) Albert Costa
13 May	2002 Hamburg Masters; Hamburg, Germany; Tennis Masters Series $2,578,000 – clay Singles – Doubles	(Switzerland) Roger Federer; 6–1, 6–3, 6–4	(Russia) Marat Safin	(Spain) Tommy Robredo (Belarus) Max Mirnyi	(Australia) Lleyton Hewitt (Austria) Stefan Koubek (France) Julien Boutter (Brazil) Gustavo Kuerten
13 May	2002 Hamburg Masters; Hamburg, Germany; Tennis Masters Series $2,578,000 – clay Singles – Doubles	(India) Mahesh Bhupathi (United States) Jan-Michael Gambill; 6–2, 6–4	(Sweden) Jonas Björkman (Australia) Todd Woodbridge	(Spain) Tommy Robredo (Belarus) Max Mirnyi	(Australia) Lleyton Hewitt (Austria) Stefan Koubek (France) Julien Boutter (Brazil) Gustavo Kuerten
20 May	2002 ARAG World Team Cup; Düsseldorf, Germany; World Team Cup $2,100,000 – clay	Argentina; 3–0	Russia	Round Robin losers (Red Group) Sweden; France; United States	Round Robin losers (Blue Group) Spain; Great Britain; Germany
20 May	2002 Internationaler Raiffeisen Grand Prix; St. Poelten, Austria; ATP International Series $381,000 – clay Singles – Doubles	(Ecuador) Nicolás Lapentti; 7–5, 6–4	(Spain) Fernando Vicente	(Brazil) Flávio Saretta (Belgium) Olivier Rochus	(Austria) Markus Hipfl (Spain) Albert Montañés (Spain) David Sánchez (Austria) Jürgen Melzer
20 May	2002 Internationaler Raiffeisen Grand Prix; St. Poelten, Austria; ATP International Series $381,000 – clay Singles – Doubles	(Czech Republic) Petr Pála (Czech Republic) David Rikl; 7–5, 6–4	(United States) Mike Bryan (Australia) Michael Hill	(Brazil) Flávio Saretta (Belgium) Olivier Rochus	(Austria) Markus Hipfl (Spain) Albert Montañés (Spain) David Sánchez (Austria) Jürgen Melzer
27 May; 3 Jun	2002 French Open; Paris, France; Grand Slam $5,268,535 – clay 128S/128Q/64D/32X; Singles – Doubles – Mixed doubles	(Spain) Albert Costa; 6–1, 6–0, 4–6, 6–3	(Spain) Juan Carlos Ferrero	(Spain) Àlex Corretja (Russia) Marat Safin	(Argentina) Guillermo Cañas (Romania) Andrei Pavel (United States) Andre Agassi (France) Sébastien Grosjean
27 May; 3 Jun	2002 French Open; Paris, France; Grand Slam $5,268,535 – clay 128S/128Q/64D/32X; Singles – Doubles – Mixed doubles	(Netherlands) Paul Haarhuis (Russia) Yevgeny Kafelnikov; 7–5, 6–4	(The Bahamas) Mark Knowles (Canada) Daniel Nestor	(Spain) Àlex Corretja (Russia) Marat Safin	(Argentina) Guillermo Cañas (Romania) Andrei Pavel (United States) Andre Agassi (France) Sébastien Grosjean
27 May; 3 Jun	2002 French Open; Paris, France; Grand Slam $5,268,535 – clay 128S/128Q/64D/32X; Singles – Doubles – Mixed doubles	(Zimbabwe) Wayne Black (Zimbabwe) Cara Black; 6–3, 6–3	(The Bahamas) Mark Knowles (Russia) Elena Bovina	(Spain) Àlex Corretja (Russia) Marat Safin	(Argentina) Guillermo Cañas (Romania) Andrei Pavel (United States) Andre Agassi (France) Sébastien Grosjean

=== June ===
Week	Tournament	Champions	Runners-up	Semifinalists	Quarterfinalists
10 Jun	2002 Gerry Weber Open; Halle, NRW, Germany; ATP International Series $951,000 – grass Singles – Doubles	(Russia) Yevgeny Kafelnikov; 2–6, 6–4, 6–4	(Germany) Nicolas Kiefer	(Denmark) Kenneth Carlsen (Switzerland) Roger Federer	(Czech Republic) Bohdan Ulihrach (Sweden) Thomas Johansson (Germany) Alexander Popp (Russia) Mikhail Youzhny
10 Jun	2002 Gerry Weber Open; Halle, NRW, Germany; ATP International Series $951,000 – grass Singles – Doubles	(Germany) David Prinosil (Czech Republic) David Rikl; 4–6, 7–6^{(7–5)}, 7–5	(Sweden) Jonas Björkman (Australia) Todd Woodbridge	(Denmark) Kenneth Carlsen (Switzerland) Roger Federer	(Czech Republic) Bohdan Ulihrach (Sweden) Thomas Johansson (Germany) Alexander Popp (Russia) Mikhail Youzhny
10 Jun	2002 Stella Artois Championships; London, United Kingdom; ATP International Series $761,000 – grass Singles – Doubles	(Australia) Lleyton Hewitt; 4–6, 6–1, 6–4	(United Kingdom) Tim Henman	(Netherlands) Sjeng Schalken (Netherlands) Raemon Sluiter	(United States) Todd Martin (Australia) Wayne Arthurs (South Africa) Wayne Ferreira (South Korea) Hyung-Taik Lee
10 Jun	2002 Stella Artois Championships; London, United Kingdom; ATP International Series $761,000 – grass Singles – Doubles	(Zimbabwe) Wayne Black (Zimbabwe) Kevin Ullyett; 7–5, 6–3	(India) Mahesh Bhupathi (Belarus) Max Mirnyi	(Netherlands) Sjeng Schalken (Netherlands) Raemon Sluiter	(United States) Todd Martin (Australia) Wayne Arthurs (South Africa) Wayne Ferreira (South Korea) Hyung-Taik Lee
17 Jun	2002 Ordina Open 's-Hertogenbosch, Netherlands; ATP International Series $381,000 – grass Singles – Doubles	(Netherlands) Sjeng Schalken; 3–6, 6–3, 6–2	(France) Arnaud Clément	(Argentina) Guillermo Cañas (Spain) Tommy Robredo	(Australia) Lleyton Hewitt (France) Cédric Pioline (Switzerland) Yves Allegro (Switzerland) Roger Federer
17 Jun	2002 Ordina Open 's-Hertogenbosch, Netherlands; ATP International Series $381,000 – grass Singles – Doubles	(Czech Republic) Martin Damm (Czech Republic) Cyril Suk; 7–6^{(8–6)}, 6–7^{(6–8)}, 6–4	(Netherlands) Paul Haarhuis (United States) Brian MacPhie	(Argentina) Guillermo Cañas (Spain) Tommy Robredo	(Australia) Lleyton Hewitt (France) Cédric Pioline (Switzerland) Yves Allegro (Switzerland) Roger Federer
17 Jun	2002 Samsung Open; Nottingham, United Kingdom; ATP International Series $381,000 – grass Singles – Doubles	(Sweden) Jonas Björkman; 6–2, 6–7^{(5–7)}, 6–2	(Australia) Wayne Arthurs	(United Kingdom) Greg Rusedski (Switzerland) Michel Kratochvil	(Russia) Andrei Stoliarov (Sweden) Magnus Larsson (United Kingdom) Arvind Parmar (France) Fabrice Santoro
17 Jun	2002 Samsung Open; Nottingham, United Kingdom; ATP International Series $381,000 – grass Singles – Doubles	(United States) Mike Bryan (The Bahamas) Mark Knowles; 0–6, 7–6^{(7–3)}, 6–4	(United States) Donald Johnson (United States) Jared Palmer	(United Kingdom) Greg Rusedski (Switzerland) Michel Kratochvil	(Russia) Andrei Stoliarov (Sweden) Magnus Larsson (United Kingdom) Arvind Parmar (France) Fabrice Santoro
24 Jun; 1 Jul	2002 Wimbledon Championships; London, United Kingdom; Grand Slam $6,061,154 – grass 128S/128Q/64D/64X; Singles – Doubles – Mixed doubles	(Australia) Lleyton Hewitt; 6–1, 6–3, 6–2	(Argentina) David Nalbandian	(United Kingdom) Tim Henman (Belgium) Xavier Malisse	(Netherlands) Sjeng Schalken (Brazil) André Sá (Netherlands) Richard Krajicek (Ecuador) Nicolás Lapentti
24 Jun; 1 Jul	2002 Wimbledon Championships; London, United Kingdom; Grand Slam $6,061,154 – grass 128S/128Q/64D/64X; Singles – Doubles – Mixed doubles	(Sweden) Jonas Björkman (Australia) Todd Woodbridge; 6–1, 6–2, 6–7^{(7–9)}, 7–5	(The Bahamas) Mark Knowles (Canada) Daniel Nestor	(United Kingdom) Tim Henman (Belgium) Xavier Malisse	(Netherlands) Sjeng Schalken (Brazil) André Sá (Netherlands) Richard Krajicek (Ecuador) Nicolás Lapentti
24 Jun; 1 Jul	2002 Wimbledon Championships; London, United Kingdom; Grand Slam $6,061,154 – grass 128S/128Q/64D/64X; Singles – Doubles – Mixed doubles	(India) Mahesh Bhupathi (Russia) Elena Likhovtseva; 6–2, 1–6, 6–1	(Zimbabwe) Kevin Ullyett (Slovakia) Daniela Hantuchová	(United Kingdom) Tim Henman (Belgium) Xavier Malisse	(Netherlands) Sjeng Schalken (Brazil) André Sá (Netherlands) Richard Krajicek (Ecuador) Nicolás Lapentti

=== July ===
Week	Tournament	Champions	Runners-up	Semifinalists	Quarterfinalists
8 Jul	2002 Swedish Open Båstad; Båstad, Sweden; ATP International Series $381,000 – clay Singles – Doubles	(Spain) Carlos Moyà; 6–3, 2–6, 7–5	(Morocco) Younes El Aynaoui	(Argentina) Agustín Calleri (Spain) Tommy Robredo	(Argentina) Guillermo Cañas (Russia) Nikolay Davydenko (Sweden) Magnus Norman (Spain) Albert Portas
8 Jul	2002 Swedish Open Båstad; Båstad, Sweden; ATP International Series $381,000 – clay Singles – Doubles	(Sweden) Jonas Björkman (Australia) Todd Woodbridge; 7–6^{(8–6)}, 6–4	(Australia) Paul Hanley (Australia) Michael Hill	(Argentina) Agustín Calleri (Spain) Tommy Robredo	(Argentina) Guillermo Cañas (Russia) Nikolay Davydenko (Sweden) Magnus Norman (Spain) Albert Portas
8 Jul	2002 Allianz Suisse Open; Gstaad, Switzerland; ATP International Series $600,000 – clay Singles – Doubles	(Spain) Àlex Corretja; 6–3, 7–6^{(7–3)}, 7–6^{(7–3)}	(Argentina) Gastón Gaudio	(Croatia) Ivan Ljubičić (Czech Republic) Radek Štěpánek	(Spain) Galo Blanco (Switzerland) Marc Rosset (Hungary) Attila Sávolt (Spain) David Sánchez
8 Jul	2002 Allianz Suisse Open; Gstaad, Switzerland; ATP International Series $600,000 – clay Singles – Doubles	(Australia) Joshua Eagle (Czech Republic) David Rikl; 7–6^{(7–5)}, 6–4	(Italy) Massimo Bertolini (Italy) Cristian Brandi	(Croatia) Ivan Ljubičić (Czech Republic) Radek Štěpánek	(Spain) Galo Blanco (Switzerland) Marc Rosset (Hungary) Attila Sávolt (Spain) David Sánchez
8 Jul	2002 Miller Lite Hall of Fame; Tennis Championships; Newport, RI, USA; ATP International Series $375,000 – grass Singles – Doubles	(United States) Taylor Dent; 6–1, 4–6, 6–4	(United States) James Blake	(France) Michaël Llodra (United States) Robby Ginepri	(United States) Justin Gimelstob (United States) Mardy Fish (Germany) Alexander Popp (United Kingdom) Martin Lee
8 Jul	2002 Miller Lite Hall of Fame; Tennis Championships; Newport, RI, USA; ATP International Series $375,000 – grass Singles – Doubles	(United States) Bob Bryan (United States) Mike Bryan; 7–5, 6–3	(Austria) Jürgen Melzer (Germany) Alexander Popp	(France) Michaël Llodra (United States) Robby Ginepri	(United States) Justin Gimelstob (United States) Mardy Fish (Germany) Alexander Popp (United Kingdom) Martin Lee
15 Jul	2002 Energis Open; Amersfoort, Netherlands; ATP International Series $381,000 – clay Singles – Doubles	(Argentina) Juan Ignacio Chela; 6–1, 7–6^{(7–4)}	(Spain) Albert Costa	(Argentina) Gastón Gaudio (Netherlands) John van Lottum	(Brazil) André Sá (Finland) Jarkko Nieminen (Belgium) Christophe Rochus (Spain) Juan Balcells
15 Jul	2002 Energis Open; Amersfoort, Netherlands; ATP International Series $381,000 – clay Singles – Doubles	(South Africa) Jeff Coetzee (South Africa) Chris Haggard; 7–6^{(7–1)}, 6–3	(Brazil) André Sá (Brazil) Alexandre Simoni	(Argentina) Gastón Gaudio (Netherlands) John van Lottum	(Brazil) André Sá (Finland) Jarkko Nieminen (Belgium) Christophe Rochus (Spain) Juan Balcells
15 Jul	2002 Mercedes Cup; Stuttgart, Germany; ATP International Series $500,000 – clay Singles – Doubles	(Russia) Mikhail Youzhny; 6–3, 3–6, 3–6, 6–4, 6–4	(Argentina) Guillermo Cañas	(Czech Republic) Jiří Novák (Germany) Lars Burgsmüller	(Spain) Tommy Robredo (Spain) Alberto Martín (Morocco) Younes El Aynaoui (Romania) Andrei Pavel
15 Jul	2002 Mercedes Cup; Stuttgart, Germany; ATP International Series $500,000 – clay Singles – Doubles	(Australia) Joshua Eagle (Czech Republic) David Rikl; 6–3, 6–4	(South Africa) David Adams (Argentina) Gastón Etlis	(Czech Republic) Jiří Novák (Germany) Lars Burgsmüller	(Spain) Tommy Robredo (Spain) Alberto Martín (Morocco) Younes El Aynaoui (Romania) Andrei Pavel
15 Jul	2002 Croatia Open; Umag, Croatia; ATP International Series $381,000 – clay Main Draw - Qualifying	(Spain) Carlos Moyà; 6–2, 6–3	(Spain) David Ferrer	(Croatia) Zeljko Krajan (Austria) Jürgen Melzer	(Argentina) Guillermo Coria (Croatia) Ivan Ljubičić (Romania) Victor Hănescu (Spain) Fernando Vicente
15 Jul	2002 Croatia Open; Umag, Croatia; ATP International Series $381,000 – clay Main Draw - Qualifying	(Czech Republic) František Čermák (Austria) Julian Knowle; 6–4, 6–4	(Spain) Albert Portas (Spain) Fernando Vicente	(Croatia) Zeljko Krajan (Austria) Jürgen Melzer	(Argentina) Guillermo Coria (Croatia) Ivan Ljubičić (Romania) Victor Hănescu (Spain) Fernando Vicente
22 Jul	2002 Generali Open; Kitzbühel, Austria; ATP International Series Gold $880,000 – clay Singles – Doubles	(Spain) Àlex Corretja; 6–4, 6–1, 6–3	(Spain) Juan Carlos Ferrero	(Argentina) Gastón Gaudio (Argentina) Mariano Zabaleta	(Spain) Albert Costa (Chile) Nicolás Massú (Romania) Andrei Pavel (Argentina) Juan Ignacio Chela
22 Jul	2002 Generali Open; Kitzbühel, Austria; ATP International Series Gold $880,000 – clay Singles – Doubles	(South Africa) Robbie Koenig (Japan) Thomas Shimada; 7–6^{(7–3)}, 6–4	(Argentina) Lucas Arnold Ker (Spain) Àlex Corretja	(Argentina) Gastón Gaudio (Argentina) Mariano Zabaleta	(Spain) Albert Costa (Chile) Nicolás Massú (Romania) Andrei Pavel (Argentina) Juan Ignacio Chela
22 Jul	2002 Mercedes-Benz Cup; Los Angeles, CA, USA; ATP International Series $400,000 – hard Singles – Doubles	(United States) Andre Agassi; 6–2, 6–4	(United States) Jan-Michael Gambill	(United States) Andy Roddick (Belarus) Max Mirnyi	(Germany) Nicolas Kiefer (Belgium) Xavier Malisse (France) Michaël Llodra (Brazil) Gustavo Kuerten
22 Jul	2002 Mercedes-Benz Cup; Los Angeles, CA, USA; ATP International Series $400,000 – hard Singles – Doubles	(France) Sébastien Grosjean (Germany) Nicolas Kiefer; 6–4, 6–4	(United States) Justin Gimelstob (France) Michaël Llodra	(United States) Andy Roddick (Belarus) Max Mirnyi	(Germany) Nicolas Kiefer (Belgium) Xavier Malisse (France) Michaël Llodra (Brazil) Gustavo Kuerten
22 Jul	2002 Idea Prokom Open; Sopot, Poland; ATP International Series $381,000 – clay Singles – Doubles	(Argentina) José Acasuso; 2–6, 6–1, 6–3	(Argentina) Franco Squillari	(Hungary) Attila Sávolt (Spain) Carlos Moyà	(Russia) Mikhail Youzhny (Belgium) Christophe Rochus (Czech Republic) Jan Vacek (Italy) Stefano Galvani
22 Jul	2002 Idea Prokom Open; Sopot, Poland; ATP International Series $381,000 – clay Singles – Doubles	(Czech Republic) František Čermák (Czech Republic) Leoš Friedl; 7–5, 7–5	(South Africa) Jeff Coetzee (Australia) Nathan Healey	(Hungary) Attila Sávolt (Spain) Carlos Moyà	(Russia) Mikhail Youzhny (Belgium) Christophe Rochus (Czech Republic) Jan Vacek (Italy) Stefano Galvani
29 Jul	2002 Canada Masters; Toronto, Canada; Tennis Masters Series $2,450,000 – hard Singles – Doubles	(Argentina) Guillermo Cañas; 6–4, 7–5	(United States) Andy Roddick	(Czech Republic) Jiří Novák (Germany) Tommy Haas	(France) Sébastien Grosjean (Argentina) David Nalbandian (France) Fabrice Santoro (Russia) Marat Safin
29 Jul	2002 Canada Masters; Toronto, Canada; Tennis Masters Series $2,450,000 – hard Singles – Doubles	(United States) Bob Bryan (United States) Mike Bryan; 4–6, 7–6^{(7–1)}, 6–3	(The Bahamas) Mark Knowles (Canada) Daniel Nestor	(Czech Republic) Jiří Novák (Germany) Tommy Haas	(France) Sébastien Grosjean (Argentina) David Nalbandian (France) Fabrice Santoro (Russia) Marat Safin

=== August ===
Week	Tournament	Champions	Runners-up	Semifinalists	Quarterfinalists
5 Aug	2002 Cincinnati Masters; Mason, OH, USA; Tennis Masters Series $2,950,000 – hard Singles – Doubles	(Spain) Carlos Moyà; 7–5, 7–6^{(7–5)}	(Australia) Lleyton Hewitt	(Chile) Fernando González (Spain) Juan Carlos Ferrero	(United States) Andre Agassi (United States) Andy Roddick (Germany) Rainer Schüttler (Australia) Wayne Arthurs
5 Aug	2002 Cincinnati Masters; Mason, OH, USA; Tennis Masters Series $2,950,000 – hard Singles – Doubles	(United States) James Blake (United States) Todd Martin; 7–5, 6–3	(India) Mahesh Bhupathi (Belarus) Max Mirnyi	(Chile) Fernando González (Spain) Juan Carlos Ferrero	(United States) Andre Agassi (United States) Andy Roddick (Germany) Rainer Schüttler (Australia) Wayne Arthurs
12 Aug	2002 RCA Championships; Indianapolis, IN, USA; ATP International Series Gold $800,000 – hard Singles – Doubles	(United Kingdom) Greg Rusedski; 6–7^{(6–8)}, 6–4, 6–4	(Spain) Félix Mantilla	(Germany) Tommy Haas (Germany) Rainer Schüttler	(Netherlands) Martin Verkerk (France) Sébastien Grosjean (France) Arnaud Clément (France) Arnaud di Pasquale
12 Aug	2002 RCA Championships; Indianapolis, IN, USA; ATP International Series Gold $800,000 – hard Singles – Doubles	(The Bahamas) Mark Knowles (Canada) Daniel Nestor; 7–6^{(7–4)}, 6–7^{(5–7)}, 6–4	(India) Mahesh Bhupathi (Belarus) Max Mirnyi	(Germany) Tommy Haas (Germany) Rainer Schüttler	(Netherlands) Martin Verkerk (France) Sébastien Grosjean (France) Arnaud Clément (France) Arnaud di Pasquale
12 Aug	2002 Legg Mason Tennis Classic; Washington, D.C., USA; ATP International Series Gold $800,000 – hard Singles – Doubles	(United States) James Blake; 1–6, 7–6^{(7–5)}, 6–4	(Thailand) Paradorn Srichaphan	(United States) Andre Agassi (Chile) Marcelo Ríos	(Sweden) Thomas Enqvist (Spain) Àlex Corretja (Finland) Jarkko Nieminen (Brazil) Fernando Meligeni
12 Aug	2002 Legg Mason Tennis Classic; Washington, D.C., USA; ATP International Series Gold $800,000 – hard Singles – Doubles	(Zimbabwe) Wayne Black (Zimbabwe) Kevin Ullyett; 3–6, 6–3, 7–5	(United States) Bob Bryan (United States) Mike Bryan	(United States) Andre Agassi (Chile) Marcelo Ríos	(Sweden) Thomas Enqvist (Spain) Àlex Corretja (Finland) Jarkko Nieminen (Brazil) Fernando Meligeni
19 Aug	2002 TD Waterhouse Cup; Long Island, NY, USA; ATP International Series $480,000 – hard Singles – Doubles	(Thailand) Paradorn Srichaphan; 5–7, 6–2, 6–2	(Argentina) Juan Ignacio Chela	(Germany) Tommy Haas (Spain) Àlex Corretja	(Finland) Jarkko Nieminen (Morocco) Younes El Aynaoui (France) Paul-Henri Mathieu (United States) Mardy Fish
19 Aug	2002 TD Waterhouse Cup; Long Island, NY, USA; ATP International Series $480,000 – hard Singles – Doubles	(India) Mahesh Bhupathi (United States) Mike Bryan; 6–3, 6–4	(Czech Republic) Petr Pála (Czech Republic) Pavel Vízner	(Germany) Tommy Haas (Spain) Àlex Corretja	(Finland) Jarkko Nieminen (Morocco) Younes El Aynaoui (France) Paul-Henri Mathieu (United States) Mardy Fish
26 Aug; 2 Sep	2002 U.S. Open; New York City, NY, USA; Grand Slam $7,129,000 – hard 128S/128Q/64D/32X; Singles – Doubles – Mixed doubles	(United States) Pete Sampras; 6–3, 6–4, 5–7, 6–4	(United States) Andre Agassi	(Australia) Lleyton Hewitt (Netherlands) Sjeng Schalken	(Morocco) Younes El Aynaoui (Belarus) Max Mirnyi (United States) Andy Roddick (Chile) Fernando González
26 Aug; 2 Sep	2002 U.S. Open; New York City, NY, USA; Grand Slam $7,129,000 – hard 128S/128Q/64D/32X; Singles – Doubles – Mixed doubles	(India) Mahesh Bhupathi (Belarus) Max Mirnyi; 6–3, 3–6, 6–4	(Czech Republic) Jiří Novák (Czech Republic) Radek Štěpánek	(Australia) Lleyton Hewitt (Netherlands) Sjeng Schalken	(Morocco) Younes El Aynaoui (Belarus) Max Mirnyi (United States) Andy Roddick (Chile) Fernando González
26 Aug; 2 Sep	2002 U.S. Open; New York City, NY, USA; Grand Slam $7,129,000 – hard 128S/128Q/64D/32X; Singles – Doubles – Mixed doubles	(United States) Mike Bryan (United States) Lisa Raymond; 7–6^{(11–9)}, 7–6^{(7–1)}	(United States) Bob Bryan (Slovenia) Katarina Srebotnik	(Australia) Lleyton Hewitt (Netherlands) Sjeng Schalken	(Morocco) Younes El Aynaoui (Belarus) Max Mirnyi (United States) Andy Roddick (Chile) Fernando González

=== September ===
Week	Tournament	Champions	Runners-up	Semifinalists	Quarterfinalists
9 Sep	2002 Open Romania; Bucharest, Romania; ATP International Series $381,000 – clay Singles – Doubles	(Spain) David Ferrer; 6–3, 6–2	(Argentina) José Acasuso	(Romania) Andrei Pavel (Spain) David Sánchez	(Spain) Juan Giner (Argentina) Franco Squillari (Spain) Galo Blanco (France) Arnaud di Pasquale
9 Sep	2002 Open Romania; Bucharest, Romania; ATP International Series $381,000 – clay Singles – Doubles	(Germany) Jens Knippschild (Sweden) Peter Nyborg; 6–3, 6–3	(Spain) Emilio Benfele Álvarez (Argentina) Andrés Schneiter	(Romania) Andrei Pavel (Spain) David Sánchez	(Spain) Juan Giner (Argentina) Franco Squillari (Spain) Galo Blanco (France) Arnaud di Pasquale
9 Sep	2002 Brasil Open; Costa do Sauipe, Brazil; ATP International Series $571,000 – hard Singles – Doubles	(Brazil) Gustavo Kuerten; 6–7^{(4–7)}, 7–5, 7–6^{(7–2)}	(Argentina) Guillermo Coria	(Paraguay) Ramón Delgado (United States) Cecil Mamiit	(Argentina) Gastón Etlis (Brazil) André Sá (Slovakia) Dominik Hrbatý (Argentina) Agustín Calleri
9 Sep	2002 Brasil Open; Costa do Sauipe, Brazil; ATP International Series $571,000 – hard Singles – Doubles	(United States) Scott Humphries (The Bahamas) Mark Merklein; 6–3, 7–6^{(7–1)}	(Brazil) Gustavo Kuerten (Brazil) André Sá	(Paraguay) Ramón Delgado (United States) Cecil Mamiit	(Argentina) Gastón Etlis (Brazil) André Sá (Slovakia) Dominik Hrbatý (Argentina) Agustín Calleri
9 Sep	2002 President's Cup; Tashkent, Uzbekistan; ATP International Series $550,000 – hard Main Draw - Qualifying	(Russia) Yevgeny Kafelnikov; 7–6^{(8–6)}, 7–5	(Belarus) Vladimir Voltchkov	(Thailand) Paradorn Srichaphan (Italy) Davide Sanguinetti	(Russia) Marat Safin (Croatia) Ivan Ljubičić (Denmark) Kristian Pless (Germany) Tommy Haas
9 Sep	2002 President's Cup; Tashkent, Uzbekistan; ATP International Series $550,000 – hard Main Draw - Qualifying	(South Africa) David Adams (South Africa) Robbie Koenig; 6–2, 7–5	(Netherlands) Raemon Sluiter (Netherlands) Martin Verkerk	(Thailand) Paradorn Srichaphan (Italy) Davide Sanguinetti	(Russia) Marat Safin (Croatia) Ivan Ljubičić (Denmark) Kristian Pless (Germany) Tommy Haas
16 Sep	Davis Cup by BNP Paribas Semifinals; Paris, France – clay Moscow, Russia – carpet (i)	Semifinal winners France 3–2; Russia 3–2	Semifinal losers United States; Argentina		
23 Sep	2002 Salem Open; Hong Kong SAR; ATP International Series $400,000 – hard	(Spain) Juan Carlos Ferrero; 6–3, 1–6, 7–6^{(7–4)}	(Spain) Carlos Moyà	(Sweden) Jonas Björkman (France) Jérôme Golmard	(Spain) Feliciano López (Spain) Francisco Clavet (Argentina) Juan Ignacio Chela (France) Antony Dupuis
23 Sep	2002 Salem Open; Hong Kong SAR; ATP International Series $400,000 – hard	(United States) Jan-Michael Gambill (United States) Graydon Oliver; 6–7^{(2–7)}, 6–4, 7–6^{(7–4)}	(Australia) Wayne Arthurs (Australia) Andrew Kratzmann	(Sweden) Jonas Björkman (France) Jérôme Golmard	(Spain) Feliciano López (Spain) Francisco Clavet (Argentina) Juan Ignacio Chela (France) Antony Dupuis
23 Sep	2002 Campionati Internazionali di Sicilia; Palermo, Italy; ATP International Series $381,000 – clay Singles – Doubles	(Chile) Fernando González; 5–7, 6–3, 6–1	(Argentina) José Acasuso	(Chile) Marcelo Ríos (Czech Republic) Bohdan Ulihrach	(Spain) David Sánchez (Peru) Luis Horna (Armenia) Sargis Sargsian (Spain) Alberto Martín
23 Sep	2002 Campionati Internazionali di Sicilia; Palermo, Italy; ATP International Series $381,000 – clay Singles – Doubles	(Argentina) Lucas Arnold Ker (Argentina) Luis Lobo; 6–4, 4–6, 6–2	(Czech Republic) František Čermák (Czech Republic) Leoš Friedl	(Chile) Marcelo Ríos (Czech Republic) Bohdan Ulihrach	(Spain) David Sánchez (Peru) Luis Horna (Armenia) Sargis Sargsian (Spain) Alberto Martín
30 Sep	2002 AIG Japan Open Tennis Championships; Tokyo, Japan; ATP International Series Gold $800,000 – hard Singles – Doubles	(Denmark) Kenneth Carlsen; 7–6^{(10–8)}, 6–3	(Sweden) Magnus Norman	(Thailand) Paradorn Srichaphan (United States) Vincent Spadea	(Australia) Lleyton Hewitt (France) Antony Dupuis (Spain) Feliciano López (Sweden) Magnus Larsson
30 Sep	2002 AIG Japan Open Tennis Championships; Tokyo, Japan; ATP International Series Gold $800,000 – hard Singles – Doubles	(South Africa) Jeff Coetzee (South Africa) Chris Haggard; 7–6^{(7–4)}, 6–4	(United States) Jan-Michael Gambill (United States) Graydon Oliver	(Thailand) Paradorn Srichaphan (United States) Vincent Spadea	(Australia) Lleyton Hewitt (France) Antony Dupuis (Spain) Feliciano López (Sweden) Magnus Larsson
30 Sep	2002 Kremlin Cup; Moscow, Russia; ATP International Series $1,000,000 – carpet (i); Singles – Doubles	(France) Paul-Henri Mathieu; 4–6, 6–2, 6–0	(Netherlands) Sjeng Schalken	(Russia) Marat Safin (Russia) Yevgeny Kafelnikov	(Switzerland) Roger Federer (Germany) Rainer Schüttler (France) Nicolas Escudé (France) Cyril Saulnier
30 Sep	2002 Kremlin Cup; Moscow, Russia; ATP International Series $1,000,000 – carpet (i); Singles – Doubles	(Switzerland) Roger Federer (Belarus) Max Mirnyi; 6–4, 7–6^{(7–0)}	(Australia) Joshua Eagle (Australia) Sandon Stolle	(Russia) Marat Safin (Russia) Yevgeny Kafelnikov	(Switzerland) Roger Federer (Germany) Rainer Schüttler (France) Nicolas Escudé (France) Cyril Saulnier

=== October ===
Week	Tournament	Champions	Runners-up	Semifinalists	Quarterfinalists
7 Oct	2002 CA Tennis Trophy; Vienna, Austria; ATP International Series Gold $765,000 – hard (i); Singles – Doubles	(Switzerland) Roger Federer; 6–4, 6–1, 3–6, 6–4	(Czech Republic) Jiří Novák	(Romania) Andrei Pavel (Spain) Carlos Moyà	(Austria) Jürgen Melzer (Russia) Nikolay Davydenko (United States) James Blake (Czech Republic) Bohdan Ulihrach
7 Oct	2002 CA Tennis Trophy; Vienna, Austria; ATP International Series Gold $765,000 – hard (i); Singles – Doubles	(Australia) Joshua Eagle (Australia) Sandon Stolle; 6–4, 6–3	(Czech Republic) Jiří Novák (Czech Republic) Radek Štěpánek	(Romania) Andrei Pavel (Spain) Carlos Moyà	(Austria) Jürgen Melzer (Russia) Nikolay Davydenko (United States) James Blake (Czech Republic) Bohdan Ulihrach
7 Oct	2002 Grand Prix de Tennis de Lyon; Lyon, France; ATP International Series $761,000 – carpet (i); Singles – Doubles	(France) Paul-Henri Mathieu; 4–6, 6–3, 6–1	(Brazil) Gustavo Kuerten	(France) Arnaud Clément (Denmark) Kristian Pless	(Russia) Marat Safin (France) Sébastien Grosjean (Sweden) Jonas Björkman (France) Nicolas Escudé
7 Oct	2002 Grand Prix de Tennis de Lyon; Lyon, France; ATP International Series $761,000 – carpet (i); Singles – Doubles	(Zimbabwe) Wayne Black (Zimbabwe) Kevin Ullyett; 6–4, 3–6, 7–6^{(7–3)}	(The Bahamas) Mark Knowles (Canada) Daniel Nestor	(France) Arnaud Clément (Denmark) Kristian Pless	(Russia) Marat Safin (France) Sébastien Grosjean (Sweden) Jonas Björkman (France) Nicolas Escudé
14 Oct	2002 Madrid Masters; Madrid, Spain; Tennis Masters Series $2,328,000 – hard (i); Singles – Doubles	(United States) Andre Agassi; W/O	(Czech Republic) Jiří Novák	(France) Fabrice Santoro (France) Sébastien Grosjean	(Switzerland) Roger Federer (Thailand) Paradorn Srichaphan (Argentina) Agustín Calleri (Spain) Juan Carlos Ferrero
14 Oct	2002 Madrid Masters; Madrid, Spain; Tennis Masters Series $2,328,000 – hard (i); Singles – Doubles	(The Bahamas) Mark Knowles (Canada) Daniel Nestor; 6–3, 7–5, 6–0	(India) Mahesh Bhupathi (Belarus) Max Mirnyi	(France) Fabrice Santoro (France) Sébastien Grosjean	(Switzerland) Roger Federer (Thailand) Paradorn Srichaphan (Argentina) Agustín Calleri (Spain) Juan Carlos Ferrero
21 Oct	2002 Davidoff Swiss Indoors; Basel, Switzerland; ATP International Series $1,000,000 – carpet (i); Singles – Doubles	(Argentina) David Nalbandian; 6–4, 6–3, 6–2	(Chile) Fernando González	(Switzerland) Roger Federer (Spain) Juan Carlos Ferrero	(United Kingdom) Tim Henman (United States) Andy Roddick (France) Arnaud Clément (Spain) Félix Mantilla
21 Oct	2002 Davidoff Swiss Indoors; Basel, Switzerland; ATP International Series $1,000,000 – carpet (i); Singles – Doubles	(United States) Bob Bryan (United States) Mike Bryan; 7–6^{(7–1)}, 7–5	(The Bahamas) Mark Knowles (Canada) Daniel Nestor	(Switzerland) Roger Federer (Spain) Juan Carlos Ferrero	(United Kingdom) Tim Henman (United States) Andy Roddick (France) Arnaud Clément (Spain) Félix Mantilla
21 Oct	2002 St. Petersburg Open; St. Petersburg, Russia; ATP International Series $1,000,000 – hard (i); Singles – Doubles	(France) Sébastien Grosjean; 7–5, 6–4	(Russia) Mikhail Youzhny	(Slovakia) Karol Kučera (Belarus) Vladimir Voltchkov	(Argentina) Gastón Gaudio (Slovakia) Dominik Hrbatý (Romania) Andrei Pavel (Germany) Nicolas Kiefer
21 Oct	2002 St. Petersburg Open; St. Petersburg, Russia; ATP International Series $1,000,000 – hard (i); Singles – Doubles	(South Africa) David Adams (United States) Jared Palmer; 7–6^{(10–8)}, 6–3	(Georgia (country)) Irakli Labadze (Russia) Marat Safin	(Slovakia) Karol Kučera (Belarus) Vladimir Voltchkov	(Argentina) Gastón Gaudio (Slovakia) Dominik Hrbatý (Romania) Andrei Pavel (Germany) Nicolas Kiefer
21 Oct	2002 If Stockholm Open; Stockholm, Sweden; ATP International Series $650,000 – hard (i); Singles – Doubles	(Thailand) Paradorn Srichaphan; 6–7^{(2–7)}, 6–0, 6–3, 6–2	(Chile) Marcelo Ríos	(Spain) Tommy Robredo (Morocco) Hicham Arazi	(Netherlands) Raemon Sluiter (France) Fabrice Santoro (Sweden) Andreas Vinciguerra (Chile) Nicolás Massú
21 Oct	2002 If Stockholm Open; Stockholm, Sweden; ATP International Series $650,000 – hard (i); Singles – Doubles	(Zimbabwe) Wayne Black (Zimbabwe) Kevin Ullyett; 6–4, 2–6, 7–6^{(7–4)}	(Australia) Wayne Arthurs (Australia) Paul Hanley	(Spain) Tommy Robredo (Morocco) Hicham Arazi	(Netherlands) Raemon Sluiter (France) Fabrice Santoro (Sweden) Andreas Vinciguerra (Chile) Nicolás Massú
28 Oct	2002 Paris Masters; Paris, France; Tennis Masters Series $2,328,000 – carpet (i); Singles – Doubles	(Russia) Marat Safin; 7–6^{(7–4)}, 6–0, 6–4	(Australia) Lleyton Hewitt	(Thailand) Paradorn Srichaphan (Spain) Carlos Moyà	(Switzerland) Roger Federer (United States) Andy Roddick (France) Nicolas Escudé (United States) Andre Agassi
28 Oct	2002 Paris Masters; Paris, France; Tennis Masters Series $2,328,000 – carpet (i); Singles – Doubles	(France) Nicolas Escudé (France) Fabrice Santoro; 6–3, 7–6^{(8–6)}	(Brazil) Gustavo Kuerten (France) Cédric Pioline	(Thailand) Paradorn Srichaphan (Spain) Carlos Moyà	(Switzerland) Roger Federer (United States) Andy Roddick (France) Nicolas Escudé (United States) Andre Agassi

=== November ===
Week	Tournament	Champions	Runners-up	Semifinalists	Round Robin
4 Nov	No tournaments scheduled.				
11 Nov	2002 Tennis Masters Cup; Shanghai, China; Tennis Masters Cup $3,700,000 – hard (i); Singles	(Australia) Lleyton Hewitt; 7–5, 7–5, 2–6, 2–6, 6–4	(Spain) Juan Carlos Ferrero	(Spain) Carlos Moyà (Switzerland) Roger Federer	(Spain) Albert Costa (Russia) Marat Safin (Czech Republic) Jiří Novák (United States) Andre Agassi (Sweden) Thomas Johansson
18 Nov	No tournaments scheduled.			(Spain) Carlos Moyà (Switzerland) Roger Federer	(Spain) Albert Costa (Russia) Marat Safin (Czech Republic) Jiří Novák (United States) Andre Agassi (Sweden) Thomas Johansson
25 Nov	Davis Cup by BNP Paribas Final; Paris, France – clay (i)	Russia 3–2	France		

== Statistical information ==
List of players and titles won (Grand Slam and Masters Cup titles in bold), listed in order of most titles won:

- (United States) Andre Agassi – Scottsdale, Miami Masters, Rome Masters, Los Angeles and Madrid Masters (5)
- (Australia) Lleyton Hewitt – San Jose, Indian Wells Masters, London Queen's Club, **Wimbledon** and **Masters Cup** (5)
- (Spain) Carlos Moyà – Acapulco, Båstad, Umag and Cincinnati Masters (4)
- (Morocco) Younes El Aynaoui – Doha, Casablanca and Munich (3)
- (Switzerland) Roger Federer – Sydney, Hamburg Masters and Vienna (3)
- (Argentina) Guillermo Cañas – Chennai and Canada Masters (2)
- (Spain) Àlex Corretja – Gstaad and Kitzbühel (2)
- (Spain) Juan Carlos Ferrero – Monte Carlo Masters and Hong Kong (2)
- (Argentina) Gastón Gaudio – Barcelona and Mallorca (2)
- (Chile) Fernando González – Viña del Mar and Palermo (2)
- (Russia) Yevgeny Kafelnikov – Halle and Tashkent (2)
- (France) Paul-Henri Mathieu – Moscow and Lyon (2)
- (Argentina) David Nalbandian – Estoril and Basel (2)
- (United States) Andy Roddick – Memphis and Houston (2)
- (United Kingdom) Greg Rusedski – Auckland and Indianapolis (2)
- (Italy) Davide Sanguinetti – Milan and Delray Beach (2)
- (Thailand) Paradorn Srichaphan – Long Island and Stockholm (2)
- (Argentina) José Acasuso – Sopot (1)
- (Sweden) Jonas Björkman – Nottingham (1)
- (United States) James Blake – Washington, D.C. (1)
- (Germany) Lars Burgsmüller – Copenhagen (1)
- (Denmark) Kenneth Carlsen – Tokyo (1)
- (Argentina) Juan Ignacio Chela – Amersfoort (1)
- (Spain) Albert Costa – **French Open** (1)
- (United States) Taylor Dent – Newport (1)
- (Sweden) Thomas Enqvist – Marseille (1)
- (France) Nicolas Escudé – Rotterdam (1)
- (Spain) David Ferrer – Bucharest (1)
- (France) Sébastien Grosjean – St. Petersburg (1)
- (United Kingdom) Tim Henman – Adelaide (1)
- (Sweden) Thomas Johansson – **Australian Open** (1)
- (Brazil) Gustavo Kuerten – Costa do Sauipe (1)
- (Ecuador) Nicolás Lapentti – St. Poelten (1)
- (Chile) Nicolás Massú – Buenos Aires (1)
- (Russia) Marat Safin – Paris Masters (1)
- (United States) Pete Sampras – **US Open** (1)
- (France) Fabrice Santoro – Dubai (1)
- (Netherlands) Sjeng Schalken – 's-Hertogenbosch (1)
- (Russia) Mikhail Youzhny – Stuttgart (1)

The following players won their first title:

- (Argentina) José Acasuso – Sopot
- (United States) James Blake – Washington, D.C.
- (Germany) Lars Burgsmüller – Copenhagen
- (United States) Taylor Dent – Newport
- (Spain) David Ferrer – Bucharest
- (Argentina) Gastón Gaudio – Barcelona
- (Chile) Nicolás Massú – Buenos Aires
- (France) Paul-Henri Mathieu – Moscow
- (Argentina) David Nalbandian – Estoril
- (Italy) Davide Sanguinetti – Milan
- (Thailand) Paradorn Srichaphan – Long Island
- (Russia) Mikhail Youzhny – Stuttgart

Titles won by nation:

- Spain 10 (Acapulco, Monte Carlos Masters, **French Open**, Båstad, Gstaad, Umag, Kitzbühel, Cincinnati Masters, Bucharest and Hong Kong)
- United States 10 (Memphis, Scottsdale, Miami Masters, Houston, Rome Masters, Newport, Los Angeles, Washington, D.C., **US Open** and Madrid Masters)
- Argentina 8 (Chennai, Estoril, Barcelona, Mallorca, Amersfoort, Sopot, Canada Masters and Basel)
- Australia 5 (San Jose, Indian Wells Masters, London Queen's Club, **Wimbledon** and **Masters Cup**)
- France 5 (Rotterdam, Dubai, Moscow, Lyon and St. Petersburg)
- Russia 4 (Halle, Stuttgart, Tashkent and Paris Masters)
- Chile 3 (Viña del Mar, Buenos Aires and Palermo)
- Morocco 3 (Doha, Casablanca and Munich)
- Sweden 3 (**Australian Open**, Marseille and Nottingham)
- Switzerland 3 (Sydney, Hamburg Masters and Vienna)
- United Kingdom 3 (Adelaide, Auckland and Indianapolis)
- Italy 2 (Milan and Delray Beach)
- Thailand 2 (Long Island and Stockholm)
- Brazil 1 (Costa do Sauipe)
- Denmark 1 (Tokyo)
- Ecuador 1 (St. Poelten)
- Germany 1 (Copenhagen)
- Netherlands 1 ('s-Hertogenbosch)

== ATP entry rankings ==
=== Singles ===
As of 31 December 2001
Rk	Name	Nation	Points
1	Lleyton Hewitt	AUS	4,365
2	Gustavo Kuerten	BRA	3,855
3	Andre Agassi	USA	3,520
4	Yevgeny Kafelnikov	RUS	3,090
5	Juan Carlos Ferrero	ESP	3,040
6	Sébastien Grosjean	FRA	2,790
7	Patrick Rafter	AUS	2,785
8	Tommy Haas	GER	2,285
9	Tim Henman	GBR	2,100
10	Pete Sampras	USA	1,940
11	Marat Safin	RUS	1,920
12	Goran Ivanišević	CRO	1,761
13	Roger Federer	SUI	1,745
14	Andy Roddick	USA	1,573
15	Guillermo Cañas	ARG	1,572
16	Àlex Corretja	ESP	1,525
17	Arnaud Clément	FRA	1,475
18	Thomas Johansson	SWE	1,375
19	Carlos Moyà	ESP	1,310
20	Albert Portas	ESP	1,220

Year-end rankings 2002 (30 December 2002)
Rk	Name	Nation	Points	High	Low	Change
1	Lleyton Hewitt	AUS	4,485	1	1	Steady
2	Andre Agassi	USA	3,395	2	10	▲1
3	Marat Safin	RUS	2,845	2	11	▲8
4	Juan Carlos Ferrero	ESP	2,740	2	11	▲1
5	Carlos Moyà	ESP	2,630	5	32	▲14
6	Roger Federer	SUI	2,590	6	14	▲7
7	Jiří Novák	CZE	2,335	5	29	▲22
8	Tim Henman	GBR	2,215	4	11	▲1
9	Albert Costa	ESP	2,070	6	42	▲31
10	Andy Roddick	USA	2,045	9	17	▲4
11	Tommy Haas	GER	2,020	2	11	▼3
12	David Nalbandian	ARG	1,775	12	48	▲35
13	Pete Sampras	USA	1,735	10	17	▼3
14	Thomas Johansson	SWE	1,725	7	18	▲4
15	Guillermo Cañas	ARG	1,725	12	20	Steady
16	Paradorn Srichaphan	THA	1,646	16	120	▲104
17	Sébastien Grosjean	FRA	1,640	4	18	▼11
18	Fernando González	CHI	1,636	17	140	▲121
19	Àlex Corretja	ESP	1,555	16	31	▼3
20	Sjeng Schalken	NED	1,525	15	34	▲6

== Retirements ==
Following is a list of notable players (winners of a main tour title, and/or part of the ATP rankings top 100 (singles) or top 50 (doubles) for at least one week) who announced their retirement from professional tennis, became inactive (after not playing for more than 52 weeks), or were permanently banned from playing, during the 2002 season:

- Karim Alami (born May 24, 1973, in Casablanca, Morocco) He turned professional in 1990 and reached his career-high ranking of no. 25 in 2000. He earned two career singles titles and one doubles title. He played his last career match in Trani, Italy in August against Potito Starace.
- Sergi Bruguera (born 16 January 1971, in Barcelona, Spain) He turned professional in 1988 and reached a career-high ranking of world no. 3. He won the French Open in 1993 and 1994 and was a semifinalist at the year-end finals in 1994. He won a silver medal at the 1996 Olympics. In doubles, he earned 3 titles and achieved a career-high ranking of world no. 49, reaching the quarterfinals of the US Open. He played his last career match in Segovia in July against Lovro Zovko.
- Magnus Gustafsson (born 3 January 1967 in Lund, Skåne, Sweden) He turned professional in 1986 and reached his career-high ranking of world no. 10 in 1991. He reached the quarterfinals of the Australian Open in 1994 and earned 14 career titles. His last match was in Stockholm in October 2001 against Jan Vacek.
- Cédric Pioline (born 15 June 1969 in Neuilly-sur-Seine, France) He turned professional in 1989 and reached a career-high ranking of no. 5. He was a finalist at the US Open in 1993 and at Wimbledon in 1997. He also won one Masters 1000 in Monte Carlo in 2000. He played his last match in October in Basel against Tim Henman.
- (Australia) Patrick Rafter (born 28 December 1972) He turned professional in 1991 and reached a ranking of world no. 1 in 1999. He won the US Open in 1997 and 1998 and was a finalist at Wimbledon and a semifinalist at the Australian Open and French Open. He won 11 career ATP titles. He played his last match in Davis Cup competition in November 2001 against France.
- (United States) Pete Sampras (born August 12, 1971, in Lake Sherwood, California) Sampras debuted on the professional tour in 1988 and played his last top-level tournament in 2002 when he won the US Open, defeating rival Andre Agassi in the final. He was the year-end world no. 1 for six consecutive years (1993–1998) and won seven Wimbledon singles championships.
- Jan Siemerink (born 14 April 1970 in Rijnsburg, South Holland, Netherlands) He turned professional in 1989 and reached his career-high ranking of no. 14 in 1998. He reached the quarterfinals of Wimbledon in 1998 and earned four career singles titles. In doubles, he was ranked no. 16 in 1996 and earned 10 career titles. He played his last match in Valencia, Spain in May partnering Dennis van Scheppingen.

== See also ==
- 2002 WTA Tour
