= 2003 BCR Open Romania =

- Date: 8–14 September
- Edition: 11th
- Category: International Series
- Draw: 32S / 16D
- Prize money: $355,000
- Surface: Clay / outdoor
- Location: Bucharest, Romania
- Venue: Arenele BNR

Champions

Singles
- (Spain) David Sánchez

Doubles
- (Germany) Karsten Braasch / (Armenia) Sargis Sargsian
← 2002 ·	BCR Open Romania	· 2004 →

The 2003 BCR Open Romania was a men's tennis tournament played on outdoor clay courts at the Arenele BNR in Bucharest in Romania and was part of the International Series of the 2003 ATP Tour. The tournament ran from 8 September through 14 September 2003. Fourth-seeded David Sánchez won the singles title.

== Finals ==
=== Singles ===
(Spain) David Sánchez defeated (Chile) Nicolás Massú 6–2, 6–2

- It was Sánchez's 2nd title of the year and the 2nd of his career.

=== Doubles ===
(Germany) Karsten Braasch / (Armenia) Sargis Sargsian defeated (Sweden) Simon Aspelin / (South Africa) Jeff Coetzee 7–6^{(9–7)}, 6–2

- It was Braasch's only title of the year and the 6th of his career. It was Sargsian's 2nd title of the year and the 3rd of his career.
