= 2003 BCR Open Romania – Doubles =

Doubles
- 2003 BCR Open Romania

Final
- Champions: (Germany) Karsten Braasch (Armenia) Sargis Sargsian
- Runners-up: (Sweden) Simon Aspelin (South Africa) Jeff Coetzee
- Score: 7–6^{(9–7)}, 6–2

Events
Singles	Doubles
← 2002 ·	BCR Open Romania	· 2004 →

Jens Knippschild and Peter Nyborg were the defending champions but did not compete that year.

Karsten Braasch and Sargis Sargsian won in the final 7–6^{(9–7)}, 6–2 against Simon Aspelin and Jeff Coetzee.

== Seeds ==
1. (Argentina) Lucas Arnold / (Argentina) Mariano Hood (semifinals)
2. (Czech Republic) František Čermák / (Czech Republic) David Škoch (first round)
3. (Sweden) Simon Aspelin / (South Africa) Jeff Coetzee (final)
4. (United States) Devin Bowen / (Australia) Ashley Fisher (first round)

== Draw ==
=== Key ===
- Q = Qualifier
- WC = Wild card
- LL = Lucky loser
- Alt = Alternate
- SE = Special exempt
- PR = Protected ranking
- ITF = ITF entry
- JE = Junior exempt
- w/o = Walkover
- r = Retired
- d = Defaulted
- SR = Special ranking

First round
1	(Argentina) L Arnold (Argentina) M Hood	6	6
(Spain) Á López Morón (Argentina) A Schneiter	3	4
(Peru) L Horna (Spain) R Ramírez Hidalgo	6^{5}	5
(Australia) A Kratzmann (South Africa) M Wakefield	7^{7}	7
4	(United States) D Bowen (Australia) A Fisher	6^{6}	6	6^{5}
(Germany) K Braasch (Armenia) S Sargsian	7^{8}	4	7^{7}
WC	(Greece) T Angelinos (Romania) R Barbu	0	2
(Chile) N Massú (Spain) D Sánchez	6	6
(Slovakia) K Beck (Sweden) J Landsberg	5	6	7^{7}
(Czech Republic) P Pála (Belgium) T Vanhoudt	7	2	6^{4}
(Germany) M Kohlmann (Netherlands) J van Lottum	2	2
3	(Sweden) S Aspelin (South Africa) J Coetzee	6	6
(Austria) J Knowle (Austria) J Melzer	6^{3}	6	6
(Spain) A Portas (Spain) F Vicente	7^{7}	3	4
WC	(Romania) I Moldovan (Romania) G Moraru	6	6^{3}	6
2	(Czech Republic) F Čermák (Czech Republic) D Škoch	2	7^{7}	3

Quarterfinals
1	(Argentina) L Arnold (Argentina) M Hood	6	6
(Australia) A Kratzmann (South Africa) M Wakefield	0	3
(Germany) K Braasch (Armenia) S Sargsian	w/o
(Chile) N Massú (Spain) D Sánchez
(Slovakia) K Beck (Sweden) J Landsberg	4	7^{7}	5
3	(Sweden) S Aspelin (South Africa) J Coetzee	6	6^{4}	7
(Austria) J Knowle (Austria) J Melzer	6	6
WC	(Romania) I Moldovan (Romania) G Moraru	4	2

Semifinals
1	(Argentina) L Arnold (Argentina) M Hood	7^{11}	2	4
(Germany) K Braasch (Armenia) S Sargsian	6^{9}	6	6
3	(Sweden) S Aspelin (South Africa) J Coetzee	7^{7}	5	7^{11}
(Austria) J Knowle (Austria) J Melzer	6^{2}	7	6^{9}

Final
(Germany) K Braasch (Armenia) S Sargsian	7^{9}	6
3	(Sweden) S Aspelin (South Africa) J Coetzee	6^{7}	2
