= 2002 Open Romania – Singles =

Singles
- 2002 Open Romania

Final
- Champion: (Spain) David Ferrer
- Runner-up: (Argentina) José Acasuso
- Score: 6–3, 6–2

Details
- Draw: 32 (4Q / 3WC)
- Seeds: 8

Events
Singles	Doubles
← 2001 ·	Open Romania	· 2003 →

Younes El Aynaoui was the defending champion but did not compete that year.

Unseeded David Ferrer won in the final 6–3, 6–2 against José Acasuso.

== Seeds ==
A champion seed is indicated in bold text while text in italics indicates the round in which that seed was eliminated.

1. (Romania) Andrei Pavel (semifinals)
2. (Switzerland) Michel Kratochvil (second round)
3. (Spain) Félix Mantilla (second round)
4. (Spain) Fernando Vicente (second round)
5. (Argentina) José Acasuso (final)
6. (Spain) Albert Montañés (first round)
7. (Spain) David Sánchez (semifinals)
8. (Romania) Adrian Voinea (first round)

== Draw ==
=== Key ===
- Q = Qualifier
- WC = Wild card
- LL = Lucky loser
- Alt = Alternate
- SE = Special exempt
- PR = Protected ranking
- ITF = ITF entry
- JE = Junior exempt
- w/o = Walkover
- r = Retired
- d = Defaulted
- SR = Special ranking

First round
1	(Romania) **A Pavel**	**6**	**6**
(Spain) A Martín	1	3
(Spain) **A Portas**	**6**	4	**6**
WC	(Romania) I Moldovan	2	**6**	3
(Croatia) Ž Krajan	3	4
Q	(Spain) **J Giner**	**6**	**6**
(Georgia (country)) **I Labadze**	**6**	**7^{7}**
8	(Romania) A Voinea	1	6^{1}
4	(Spain) **F Vicente**	1	**6**	**6**
Q	(Germany) D Elsner	**6**	3	2
(Argentina) **F Squillari**	**6**	**6**
(Sweden) A Vinciguerra	3	1
WC	(Romania) **V Hănescu**	**7^{7}**	1
(Spain) J Balcells	6^{3}	1^{r}
(Belgium) D Norman	3	2
5	(Argentina) **J Acasuso**	**6**	**6**
7	(Spain) **D Sánchez**	3	**6**	**6**
(France) C Pioline	**6**	1	2
(Belgium) **C Rochus**	**7**	5
WC	(Romania) G Trifu	5	5^{r}
Q	(Spain) D Pérez	6^{6}	0
Q	(Spain) **G Blanco**	**7^{8}**	**6**
(Costa Rica) J A Marín	5	2
3	(Spain) **F Mantilla**	**7**	**6**
6	(Spain) A Montañés	4	4
(Austria) **J Melzer**	**6**	**6**
(Italy) A Gaudenzi	**6**	1	0
(Spain) **D Ferrer**	4	**6**	**6**
(France) **A di Pasquale**	**6**	**6**
(France) N Coutelot	2	1
(Monaco) J-R Lisnard	4	6^{5}
2	(Switzerland) **M Kratochvil**	**6**	**7^{7}**

Second round
1	(Romania) **A Pavel**	4	**6**	**6**
(Spain) A Portas	**6**	4	2
Q	(Spain) **J Giner**	**6**	**6**
(Georgia (country)) I Labadze	3	2
4	(Spain) F Vicente	6^{6}	**7**	1
(Argentina) **F Squillari**	**7^{8}**	5	**6**
WC	(Romania) V Hănescu	4	2
5	(Argentina) **J Acasuso**	**6**	**6**
7	(Spain) **D Sánchez**	**6**	**6**
(Belgium) C Rochus	2	1
Q	(Spain) **G Blanco**	**6**	4	**6**
3	(Spain) F Mantilla	1	**6**	2
(Austria) J Melzer	4	6^{6}
(Spain) **D Ferrer**	**6**	**7^{8}**
(France) **A di Pasquale**	**7**	**6**
2	(Switzerland) M Kratochvil	5	1

Quarterfinals
1	(Romania) **A Pavel**	**6**	**6**
Q	(Spain) J Giner	1	3
(Argentina) F Squillari	1	6^{4}
5	(Argentina) **J Acasuso**	**6**	**7^{7}**
7	(Spain) **D Sánchez**	**6**	**6**
Q	(Spain) G Blanco	1	3
(Spain) **D Ferrer**	**6**	**6**
(France) A di Pasquale	3	1

Semifinals
1	(Romania) A Pavel	**6**	6^{4}	1
5	(Argentina) **J Acasuso**	4	**7^{7}**	**6**
7	(Spain) D Sánchez	1	2
(Spain) **D Ferrer**	**6**	**6**

Final
5	(Argentina) José Acasuso	3	2
(Spain) **David Ferrer**	**6**	**6**
