= 2002 Mercedes Cup =

- Date: 15–21 July
- Edition: 54th
- Category: International Series
- Draw: 32S / 16D
- Prize money: $475,000
- Surface: Clay / outdoor
- Location: Stuttgart, Germany
- Venue: Tennis Club Weissenhof

Champions

Singles
- (Russia) Mikhail Youzhny

Doubles
- (Australia) Joshua Eagle / (Czech Republic) David Rikl
- Stuttgart Open

The 2002 Mercedes Cup was a men's tennis tournament played on outdoor clay courts at the Tennis Club Weissenhof in Stuttgart, Germany and was part of the International Series of the 2002 ATP Tour. The tournament ran from 15 July until 21 July 2002. Mikhail Youzhny won the singles title.

== Finals ==
=== Singles ===
(Russia) Mikhail Youzhny defeated (Argentina) Guillermo Cañas 6–3, 3–6, 3–6, 6–4, 6–4

- It was Youzhny's only title of the year and the 1st of his career.

=== Doubles ===
(Australia) Joshua Eagle / (Czech Republic) David Rikl defeated (South Africa) David Adams / (Argentina) Gastón Etlis 6–3, 6–4

- It was Eagle's 2nd title of the year and the 4th of his career. It was Rikl's 4th title of the year and the 26th of his career.
