= 2002 Mercedes Cup – Doubles =

Doubles
- 2002 Mercedes Cup
- 2001 Champion: (Argentina) Guillermo Cañas (Germany) Rainer Schüttler

Final
- Champion: (Australia) Joshua Eagle (Czech Republic) David Rikl
- Runner-up: (South Africa) David Adams (Argentina) Gastón Etlis
- Score: 6–3, 6–4

Details
- Draw: 16
- Seeds: 4

Events
Singles	Doubles
- Stuttgart Open

Guillermo Cañas and Rainer Schüttler were the defending champions but they competed with different partners that year, Cañas with Younes El Aynaoui and Schüttler with Mikhail Youzhny.

Schüttler and Youzhny lost in the first round to Juan Ignacio Carrasco and Álex López Morón.

Cañas and El Aynaoui lost in the quarterfinals to Nicolás Lapentti and Jeff Tarango.

Joshua Eagle and David Rikl won in the final 6–3, 6–4 against David Adams and Gastón Etlis.

== Seeds ==
Champion seeds are indicated in bold text while text in italics indicates the round in which those seeds were eliminated.

1. (Australia) **Joshua Eagle** / (Czech Republic) **David Rikl (champions)**
2. (South Africa) David Adams / (Argentina) Gastón Etlis (final)
3. (Czech Republic) Petr Luxa / (Czech Republic) Cyril Suk (quarterfinals)
4. (Czech Republic) Leoš Friedl / (Czech Republic) Jiří Novák (first round)

== Draw ==
Key

- Q = Qualifier
- WC = Wild card
- LL = Lucky loser
- Alt = Alternate
- ITF = ITF entry
- PR = Protected ranking
- SR = Special ranking
- SE = Special exempt
- JE = Junior exempt
- JR = Junior Accelerator Programme entrant
- CO = College Accelerator Programme entrant
- NG = Next Gen Accelerator Program entrant
- w/o = Walkover
- r = Retired
- d = Defaulted

First round
1	(Australia) **J Eagle** (Czech Republic) **D Rikl**	**6**	6^{3}	**6**
(France) J Boutter (Bulgaria) O Stanoytchev	4	**7^{7}**	2
(Australia) **B Ellwood** (North Macedonia) **A Kitinov**	**6**	**6**
(Germany) M-K Goellner (Argentina) M Rodríguez	3	3
4	(Czech Republic) L Friedl (Czech Republic) J Novák	4	**6**	6^{4}
(Argentina) **G Cañas** (Morocco) **Y El Aynaoui**	**6**	1	**7^{7}**
(Germany) K Braasch (Germany) J Knippschild	5	4
(Ecuador) **N Lapentti** (United States) **J Tarango**	**7**	**6**
(Germany) R Schüttler (Russia) M Youzhny	4	2
(Spain) **J I Carrasco** (Spain) **Á López Morón**	**6**	**6**
WC	(Germany) P Petzschner (Germany) S Stadler	6^{0}	2
3	(Czech Republic) **P Luxa** (Czech Republic) **C Suk**	**7^{7}**	**6**
WC	(Iran) **M Bahrami** (Romania) **A Pavel**	4	**6**	**6**
(Morocco) H Arazi (Spain) T Robredo	**6**	1	4
WC	(Germany) L Burgsmüller (Slovakia) D Hrbatý	3	**6**	1
2	(South Africa) **D Adams** (Argentina) **G Etlis**	**6**	3	**6**

Quarterfinals
1	(Australia) **J Eagle** (Czech Republic) **D Rikl**	**6**	**6**
(Australia) B Ellwood (North Macedonia) A Kitinov	3	4
(Argentina) G Cañas (Morocco) Y El Aynaoui	**6**	4	1
(Ecuador) **N Lapentti** (United States) **J Tarango**	1	**6**	**6**
(Spain) **J I Carrasco** (Spain) **Á López Morón**	**7^{7}**	6^{3}	**6**
3	(Czech Republic) P Luxa (Czech Republic) C Suk	6^{5}	**7^{7}**	3
WC	(Iran) M Bahrami (Romania) A Pavel	6^{5}	3
2	(South Africa) **D Adams** (Argentina) **G Etlis**	**7^{7}**	**6**

Semifinals
1	(Australia) **J Eagle** (Czech Republic) **D Rikl**	4	**6**	**6**
(Ecuador) N Lapentti (United States) J Tarango	**6**	1	2
(Spain) J I Carrasco (Spain) Á López Morón	6^{4}	3
2	(South Africa) **D Adams** (Argentina) **G Etlis**	**7^{7}**	**6**

Final
1	(Australia) **Joshua Eagle** (Czech Republic) **David Rikl**	**6**	**6**
2	(South Africa) David Adams (Argentina) Gastón Etlis	3	4
