= 2002 Open Romania – Doubles =

Doubles
- 2002 Open Romania

Final
- Champions: (Germany) Jens Knippschild; (Sweden) Peter Nyborg
- Runners-up: (Spain) Emilio Benfele Álvarez; (Argentina) Andrés Schneiter
- Score: 6–3, 6–3

Events
Singles	Doubles
- Open Romania

Aleksandar Kitinov and Johan Landsberg were the defending champions but they competed with different partners that year, Kitinov with Lovro Zovko and Landsberg with Karsten Braasch.

Kitinov and Zovko lost in the first round to Galo Blanco and Juan Antonio Marín.

Braasch and Landsberg lost in the quarterfinals to Juan Ignacio Carrasco and Álex López Morón.

Jens Knippschild and Peter Nyborg won in the final 6–3, 6–3 against Emilio Benfele Álvarez and Andrés Schneiter.

== Seeds ==
1. (Germany) Karsten Braasch / (Sweden) Johan Landsberg (quarterfinals)
2. (Italy) Massimo Bertolini / (Italy) Cristian Brandi (quarterfinals)
3. (North Macedonia) Aleksandar Kitinov / (Croatia) Lovro Zovko (first round)
4. (Spain) Emilio Benfele Álvarez / (Argentina) Andrés Schneiter (final)

== Draw ==
Key

- Q = Qualifier
- WC = Wild card
- LL = Lucky loser
- Alt = Alternate
- ITF = ITF entry
- PR = Protected ranking
- SR = Special ranking
- SE = Special exempt
- JE = Junior exempt
- JR = Junior Accelerator Programme entrant
- CO = College Accelerator Programme entrant
- NG = Next Gen Accelerator Program entrant
- w/o = Walkover
- r = Retired
- d = Defaulted

First round

Quarterfinals

Semifinals

Final

1
- (Germany) K Braasch
- (Sweden) J Landsberg
6
6

- (Romania) A Apostu-Efremov
- (Romania) R Sabău
3
4

1
- (Germany) K Braasch
- (Sweden) J Landsberg
4
6^{4}

- (Spain) J I Carrasco
- (Spain) Á López Morón
7
6

- (Spain) J I Carrasco
- (Spain) Á López Morón
6
7^{7}

WC
- (Romania) V Ioniță
- (Romania) G Moraru
5
2

- (Spain) J I Carrasco
- (Spain) Á López Morón
6
4
4

4
- (Spain) E Benfele Álvarez
- (Argentina) A Schneiter
w/o

4
- (Spain) E Benfele Álvarez
- (Argentina) A Schneiter
1
6
6

- (Switzerland) M Kratochvil
- (Spain) A Martín

4
- (Spain) E Benfele Álvarez
- (Argentina) A Schneiter
4
6
7^{7}

- (Romania) A Pavel
- (Romania) G Trifu
3
6
1

- (Italy) A Gaudenzi
- (United States) J Tarango
6
3
6^{5}

- (Italy) A Gaudenzi
- (United States) J Tarango
6
0
6

4
- (Spain) E Benfele Álvarez
- (Argentina) A Schneiter
3
3

- (Germany) J Knippschild
- (Sweden) P Nyborg
6
6

- (Germany) J Knippschild
- (Sweden) P Nyborg
6
6

- (Spain) A Portas
- (Spain) F Vicente
4
4

- (Germany) J Knippschild
- (Sweden) P Nyborg
6
6

ALT
- (Spain) G Blanco
- (Costa Rica) J A Marín
6
7

ALT
- (Spain) G Blanco
- (Costa Rica) J A Marín
3
3

3
- (North Macedonia) A Kitinov
- (Croatia) L Zovko
3
5

- (Germany) J Knippschild
- (Sweden) P Nyborg
w/o

- (Spain) F Mantilla
- (Spain) D Sánchez
6
7^{7}

- (Spain) F Mantilla
- (Spain) D Sánchez

WC
- (Romania) V Hănescu
- (Romania) I Moldovan
3
6^{5}

- (Spain) F Mantilla
- (Spain) D Sánchez
6
6

- (Germany) M Hilpert
- (Australia) G Silcock
3
6
0

2
- (Italy) M Bertolini
- (Italy) C Brandi
4
1

2
- (Italy) M Bertolini
- (Italy) C Brandi
6
3
6
