= 2002 Energis Open =

- Date: 15–21 July
- Edition: 45th
- Category: International Series
- Draw: 32S / 16D
- Prize money: €356,000
- Surface: Clay / outdoor
- Location: Amersfoort, Netherlands

Champions

Singles
- (Argentina) Juan Ignacio Chela

Doubles
- (South Africa) Jeff Coetzee / (South Africa) Chris Haggard
- Dutch Open

The 2002 Energis Open was a men's tennis tournament played on outdoor clay courts in Amersfoort, the Netherlands and was part of the International Series of the 2002 ATP Tour. It was the 45th edition of the tournament and ran from 15 July until 21 July 2002. Second-seeded Juan Ignacio Chela won the singles title.

== Finals ==
=== Singles ===
(Argentina) Juan Ignacio Chela defeated (Spain) Albert Costa 6–1, 7–6^{(7–4)}

- It was Chela's only title of the year and the 2nd of his career.

=== Doubles ===
(South Africa) Jeff Coetzee / (South Africa) Chris Haggard defeated (Brazil) André Sá / (Brazil) Alexandre Simoni 7–6^{(7–1)}, 6–3

- It was Coetzee's 1st title of the year and the 1st of his career. It was Haggard's 1st title of the year and the 2nd of his career.
