= 2002 If Stockholm Open =

- Date: 21–27 October
- Edition: 34th
- Category: International Series
- Draw: 32S / 16D
- Prize money: $775,000
- Surface: Hard / indoor
- Location: Stockholm, Sweden
- Venue: Kungliga tennishallen

Champions

Singles
- (Thailand) Paradorn Srichaphan

Doubles
- (Zimbabwe) Wayne Black / (Zimbabwe) Kevin Ullyett
- Stockholm Open

The 2002 If Stockholm Open was a men's tennis tournament played on indoor hard courts at the Kungliga tennishallen in Stockholm, Sweden and was part of the International Series of the 2002 ATP Tour. The tournament occurred from 21 October through 27 October 2002 with Paradorn Srichaphan winning the singles title.

== Finals ==
=== Singles ===
(Thailand) Paradorn Srichaphan defeated (Chile) Marcelo Ríos 6–7^{(2–7)}, 6–0, 6–3, 6–2

- It was Srichaphan's 2nd title of the year and the 2nd of his career.

=== Doubles ===
(Zimbabwe) Wayne Black / (Zimbabwe) Kevin Ullyett defeated (Australia) Wayne Arthurs / (Australia) Paul Hanley 6–4, 2–6, 7–6^{(7–4)}

- It was Black's 6th title of the year and the 13th of his career. It was Ullyett's 6th title of the year and the 19th of his career.
