= 2002 Open Romania =

- Date: 9–15 September
- Edition: 10th
- Category: International Series
- Draw: 32S / 16D
- Prize money: $356,000
- Surface: Clay / outdoor
- Location: Bucharest, Romania
- Venue: Arenele BNR

Champions

Singles
- (Spain) David Ferrer

Doubles
- (Germany) Jens Knippschild / (Sweden) Peter Nyborg
← 2001 ·	Open Romania	· 2003 →

The 2002 Open Romania was a men's tennis tournament played on outdoor clay courts at the Arenele BNR in Bucharest in Romania and was part of the International Series of the 2002 ATP Tour. It was the 10th edition of the tournament and was held from 9 September through 15 September 2002.

Unseeded David Ferrer won the singles title.

== Finals ==
=== Singles ===
(Spain) David Ferrer defeated (Argentina) José Acasuso 6–3, 6–2

- It was Ferrer's only title of the year and the 1st of his career.

=== Doubles ===
(Germany) Jens Knippschild / (Sweden) Peter Nyborg defeated (Spain) Emilio Benfele Álvarez / (Argentina) Andrés Schneiter 6–3, 6–3

- It was Knippschild's only title of the year and the 2nd of his career. It was Nyborg's only title of the year and the 5th of his career.
