= 2002 Mercedes Cup – Singles =

Singles
- 2002 Mercedes Cup

Final
- Champion: (Russia) Mikhail Youzhny
- Runner-up: (Argentina) Guillermo Cañas
- Score: 6–3, 3–6, 3–6, 6–4, 6–4

Details
- Draw: 32
- Seeds: 8

Events
Singles	Doubles
- Stuttgart Open

Gustavo Kuerten was the defending champion but lost in the second round to Lars Burgsmüller.

Unseeded Mikhail Youzhny won in the final 6–3, 3–6, 3–6, 6–4, 6–4 against Guillermo Cañas.

== Seeds ==
A champion seed is indicated in bold while text in italics indicates the round in which that seed was eliminated.

1. (Czech Republic) Jiří Novák (semifinals)
2. (Brazil) Gustavo Kuerten (second round)
3. (Argentina) Guillermo Cañas (final)
4. (Morocco) Younes El Aynaoui (quarterfinals)
5. (Romania) Andrei Pavel (quarterfinals)
6. (Ecuador) Nicolás Lapentti (second round)
7. (Germany) Rainer Schüttler (first round)
8. (Spain) Tommy Robredo (quarterfinals)

== Draw ==
Key

- Q = Qualifier
- WC = Wild card
- LL = Lucky loser
- Alt = Alternate
- ITF = ITF entry
- PR = Protected ranking
- SR = Special ranking
- SE = Special exempt
- JE = Junior exempt
- JR = Junior Accelerator Programme entrant
- CO = College Accelerator Programme entrant
- NG = Next Gen Accelerator Program entrant
- w/o = Walkover
- r = Retired
- d = Defaulted
- NB: The Final was the best of 5 sets while all other rounds were the best of 3 sets.

=== Final ===
Final
3	(Argentina) Guillermo Cañas	3	**6**	**6**	4	4
	(Russia) **Mikhail Youzhny**	**6**	3	3	**6**	**6**

=== Section 1 ===
First round
1	(Czech Republic) **J Novák**	3	**6**	**6**
Q	(Spain) R Ramírez Hidalgo	**6**	0	2
(Brazil) **F Meligeni**	5	**6**	**6**
(Hungary) A Sávolt	**7**	3	3
Q	(Czech Republic) J Hernych	0	2
WC	(Germany) **A Popp**	**6**	**6**
(Czech Republic) B Ulihrach	4	2
8	(Spain) **T Robredo**	**6**	**6**
3	(Argentina) **G Cañas**	**6**	**6**
(Armenia) S Sargsian	3	4
(Spain) **F Mantilla**	**6**	**6**
WC	(Germany) J Knippschild	3	1
(Romania) **A Voinea**	**6**	**6**
(France) A Dupuis	4	2
(Spain) **A Martín**	6^{4}	**6**	**6**
7	(Germany) R Schüttler	**7^{7}**	2	3

Second round
1	(Czech Republic) **J Novák**	**6**	**6**
(Brazil) F Meligeni	0	2
WC	(Germany) A Popp	6^{4}	3
8	(Spain) **T Robredo**	**7^{7}**	**6**
3	(Argentina) **G Cañas**	**6**	**6**
(Spain) F Mantilla	4	3
(Romania) A Voinea	4	4
(Spain) **A Martín**	**6**	**6**

Quarterfinals
1	(Czech Republic) **J Novák**	**6**	**6**
8	(Spain) T Robredo	4	2
3	(Argentina) **G Cañas**	1	**6**	**7^{7}**
(Spain) A Martín	**6**	2	6^{5}

Semifinals
1	(Czech Republic) J Novák	4	0
3	(Argentina) **G Cañas**	**6**	**6**

=== Section 2 ===
First round
6	(Ecuador) **N Lapentti**	**7^{7}**	2	**6**
(Italy) A Gaudenzi	6^{1}	**6**	4
(Morocco) H Arazi	2	**7**	4
(Russia) **M Youzhny**	**6**	5	**6**
(Spain) F Clavet	4	4
Q	(Sweden) **J Settergren**	**6**	**6**
(Spain) D Sánchez	**6**	4	4
4	(Morocco) **Y El Aynaoui**	1	**6**	**6**
5	(Romania) **A Pavel**	**6**	1	**6**
(Slovakia) D Hrbatý	3	**6**	3
(France) **J Boutter**	**6**	**6**
Q	(France) J Varlet	3	1
WC	(Germany) B Phau	6^{4}	4
(Germany) **L Burgsmüller**	**7^{7}**	**6**
(Austria) S Koubek	3	3
2	(Brazil) **G Kuerten**	**6**	**6**

Second round
6	(Ecuador) N Lapentti	2	4
(Russia) **M Youzhny**	**6**	**6**
Q	(Sweden) J Settergren	4	2
4	(Morocco) **Y El Aynaoui**	**6**	**6**
5	(Romania) **A Pavel**	**6**	**6**
(France) J Boutter	2	1
(Germany) **L Burgsmüller**	**7^{7}**	3	**7^{7}**
2	(Brazil) G Kuerten	6^{5}	**6**	6^{4}

Quarterfinals
(Russia) **M Youzhny**	**6**	**6**
4	(Morocco) Y El Aynaoui	3	2
5	(Romania) A Pavel	**6**	3	2
(Germany) **L Burgsmüller**	3	**6**	**6**

Semifinals
(Russia) **M Youzhny**	**6**	4	**7**
(Germany) L Burgsmüller	3	**6**	5
