= 2002 Energis Open – Doubles =

Doubles
- 2002 Energis Open

Final
- Champions: (South Africa) Jeff Coetzee (South Africa) Chris Haggard
- Runners-up: (Brazil) André Sá (Brazil) Alexandre Simoni
- Score: 7–6^{(7–1)}, 6–3

Events
Singles	Doubles
← 2001 ·	Energis Open	· 2003 →

Paul Haarhuis and Sjeng Schalken were the defending champions but only Haarhuis competed that year with John van Lottum.

Haarhuis and van Lottum lost in the first round to Raemon Sluiter and Martin Verkerk.

Jeff Coetzee and Chris Haggard won in the final 7–6^{(7–1)}, 6–3 against André Sá and Alexandre Simoni.

== Seeds ==
1. (South Africa) Robbie Koenig / (Japan) Thomas Shimada (first round)
2. (Australia) Andrew Kratzmann / (Russia) Andrei Olhovskiy (quarterfinals)
3. (South Africa) Marius Barnard / (Australia) Stephen Huss (first round)
4. (United States) Devin Bowen / (Australia) Ashley Fisher (semifinals)

== Draw ==
=== Key ===
- Q = Qualifier
- WC = Wild card
- LL = Lucky loser
- Alt = Alternate
- SE = Special exempt
- PR = Protected ranking
- ITF = ITF entry
- JE = Junior exempt
- w/o = Walkover
- r = Retired
- d = Defaulted
- SR = Special ranking

First round
1	(South Africa) R Koenig (Japan) T Shimada	5	3
(South Africa) J Coetzee (South Africa) C Haggard	7	6
WC	(Sweden) M Norman (Sweden) A Vinciguerra	3	4
(Argentina) M Hood (Argentina) S Prieto	6	6
3	(South Africa) M Barnard (Australia) S Huss	2	3
(Argentina) J I Chela (Argentina) M Zabaleta	6	6
(Spain) J Balcells (Germany) M Kohlmann	6	6^{9}	6
(Australia) J Kerr (Australia) G Silcock	3	7^{11}	4
WC	(Netherlands) P Haarhuis (Netherlands) J van Lottum	3	6	5
WC	(Netherlands) R Sluiter (Netherlands) M Verkerk	6	3	7
(Australia) T Crichton (The Bahamas) M Merklein	4	4
4	(United States) D Bowen (Australia) A Fisher	6	6
(Spain) À Corretja (Spain) A Costa
(Brazil) A Sá (Brazil) A Simoni	w/o
(Australia) N Healey (Sweden) J Landsberg	3	5
2	(Australia) A Kratzmann (Russia) A Olhovskiy	6	7

Quarterfinals
(South Africa) J Coetzee (South Africa) C Haggard	6	6
(Argentina) M Hood (Argentina) S Prieto	4	2
(Argentina) J I Chela (Argentina) M Zabaleta	6	7
(Spain) J Balcells (Germany) M Kohlmann	3	5
WC	(Netherlands) R Sluiter (Netherlands) M Verkerk	3	2
4	(United States) D Bowen (Australia) A Fisher	6	6
(Brazil) A Sá (Brazil) A Simoni	6	7^{7}
2	(Australia) A Kratzmann (Russia) A Olhovskiy	4	6^{4}

Semifinals
(South Africa) J Coetzee (South Africa) C Haggard	w/o
(Argentina) J I Chela (Argentina) M Zabaleta
4	(United States) D Bowen (Australia) A Fisher	2	7	6^{4}
(Brazil) A Sá (Brazil) A Simoni	6	5	7^{7}

Final
(South Africa) J Coetzee (South Africa) C Haggard	7^{7}	6
(Brazil) A Sá (Brazil) A Simoni	6^{1}	3
