= 2002 Energis Open – Singles =

Singles
- 2002 Energis Open
- 2001 Champion: (Spain) Àlex Corretja

Final
- Champion: (Argentina) Juan Ignacio Chela
- Runner-up: (Spain) Albert Costa
- Score: 6–1, 7–6^{(7–4)}

Events
| Singles | Doubles |
- Energis Open

Àlex Corretja was the defending champion but lost in the second round to Christophe Rochus.

Juan Ignacio Chela won in the final 6–1, 7–6^{(7–4)} against Albert Costa.

== Seeds ==
A champion seed is indicated in bold while text in italics indicates the round in which that seed was eliminated.

1. (Spain) Albert Costa (final)
2. (Argentina) **Juan Ignacio Chela (champion)**
3. (Argentina) Gastón Gaudio (semifinals)
4. (Spain) Àlex Corretja (second round)
5. (Finland) Jarkko Nieminen (quarterfinals)
6. (Chile) Fernando González (first round)
7. (Argentina) Mariano Zabaleta (first round)
8. (Belgium) Olivier Rochus (first round)

== Draw ==
Key

- Q = Qualifier
- WC = Wild card
- LL = Lucky loser
- Alt = Alternate
- ITF = ITF entry
- PR = Protected ranking
- SR = Special ranking
- SE = Special exempt
- JE = Junior exempt
- JR = Junior Accelerator Programme entrant
- CO = College Accelerator Programme entrant
- NG = Next Gen Accelerator Program entrant
- w/o = Walkover
- r = Retired
- d = Defaulted

First round
1 | (Spain) **A Costa** | 3 | **6** | **6**
Q | (Uzbekistan) O Ogorodov | **6** | 3 | 2
WC | (Netherlands) **M Verkerk** | **6** | 3 | **6**
Q | (Argentina) S Prieto | 3 | **6** | 3
(Denmark) **K Pless** | **6** | **7^{7}**
WC | (Netherlands) J Siemerink | 2 | 6^{1}
(Brazil) **A Sá** | **6** | **6**
8 | (Belgium) O Rochus | 4 | 2
3 | (Argentina) **G Gaudio** | **6** | 1 | **6**
(Russia) N Davydenko | 1 | **6** | 1
(United States) M Russell | 1 | 3
(Argentina) **J Acasuso** | **6** | **6**
(Switzerland) M Rosset | 2^{r}
WC | (Sweden) **M Norman** | 3
(Georgia (country)) I Labadze | 5 | 1
5 | (Finland) **J Nieminen** | **7** | **6**
7 | (Argentina) M Zabaleta | 5 | 4
Q | (Netherlands) **J van Lottum** | **7** | **6**
(Russia) A Stoliarov | 4 | **6** | 4
(Netherlands) **R Sluiter** | **6** | 3 | **6**
(Belgium) **C Rochus** | **6** | **6**
(Switzerland) I Heuberger | 3 | 0
(Brazil) A Simoni | 2 | 4
4 | (Spain) **À Corretja** | **6** | **6**
6 | (Chile) F González | 6^{3} | 3
(Spain) **J Balcells** | **7^{7}** | **6**
(Brazil) **F Saretta** | **7^{7}** | **6**
(France) N Coutelot | 6^{3} | 3
Q | (Sweden) R Söderling | **7^{7}** | 0 | 6^{5}
(Germany) **M Kohlmann** | 6^{3} | **6** | **7^{7}**
(Sweden) A Vinciguerra | 2 | 4
2 | (Argentina) **J I Chela** | **6** | **6**

Second round
1 | (Spain) **A Costa** | 3 | **6** | **6**
WC | (Netherlands) M Verkerk | **6** | 3 | 4
(Denmark) K Pless | 1 | 4
(Brazil) **A Sá** | **6** | **6**
3 | (Argentina) **G Gaudio** | 3 | **6** | **6**
(Argentina) J Acasuso | **6** | 1 | 1
WC | (Sweden) M Norman | 5 | 2
5 | (Finland) **J Nieminen** | **7** | **6**
Q | (Netherlands) **J van Lottum** | **6** | **6**
(Netherlands) R Sluiter | 4 | 3
(Belgium) **C Rochus** | 3 | **6** | **6**
4 | (Spain) À Corretja | **6** | 1 | 3
(Spain) **J Balcells** | **6** | **7**
(Brazil) F Saretta | 2 | 5
(Germany) M Kohlmann | **7** | 2 | 2
2 | (Argentina) **J I Chela** | 5 | **6** | **6**

Quarterfinals
1 | (Spain) **A Costa** | **6** | **6**
(Brazil) A Sá | 3 | 2
3 | (Argentina) **G Gaudio** | **6** | **6**
5 | (Finland) J Nieminen | 1 | 2
Q | (Netherlands) **J van Lottum** | **6** | **6**
(Belgium) C Rochus | 4 | 4
(Spain) J Balcells | 6^{7} | 3
2 | (Argentina) **J I Chela** | **7^{9}** | **6**

Semifinals
1 | (Spain) **A Costa** | **6** | 6^{1} | **6**
3 | (Argentina) G Gaudio | 4 | **7^{7}** | 3
Q | (Netherlands) J van Lottum | **6** | 3 | 3
2 | (Argentina) **J I Chela** | 2 | **6** | **6**

Final
1 | (Spain) Albert Costa | 1 | 6^{4}
2 | (Argentina) **Juan Ignacio Chela** | **6** | **7^{7}**
