= 2002 If Stockholm Open – Doubles =

Doubles
- 2002 If Stockholm Open

Final
- Champions: (Zimbabwe) Wayne Black (Zimbabwe) Kevin Ullyett
- Runners-up: (Australia) Wayne Arthurs (Australia) Paul Hanley
- Score: 6–4, 2–6, 7–6^{(7–4)}

Events
| Singles | Doubles |
| ← 2001 · | If Stockholm Open | · 2003 → |

Donald Johnson and Jared Palmer were the defending champions but did not compete that year.

Wayne Black and Kevin Ullyett won in the final 6–4, 2–6, 7–6^{(7–4)} against Wayne Arthurs and Paul Hanley.

== Seeds ==
1. (Sweden) Jonas Björkman / (Australia) Todd Woodbridge (quarterfinals)
2. (Zimbabwe) Wayne Black / (Zimbabwe) Kevin Ullyett (champions)
3. (Australia) Joshua Eagle / (Australia) Sandon Stolle (semifinals)
4. (United States) Graydon Oliver / (France) Fabrice Santoro (quarterfinals)

== Draw ==
=== Key ===
- Q = Qualifier
- WC = Wild card
- LL = Lucky loser
- Alt = Alternate
- SE = Special exempt
- PR = Protected ranking
- ITF = ITF entry
- JE = Junior exempt
- w/o = Walkover
- r = Retired
- d = Defaulted
- SR = Special ranking

First round
1 | (Sweden) J Björkman (Australia) T Woodbridge | 6 | 6
WC | (Sweden) F Prpic (Sweden) R Söderling | 4 | 2
WC | (Australia) L Hewitt (Sweden) J Johansson | 5 | 6 | 3
(South Africa) J Coetzee (South Africa) C Haggard | 7 | 3 | 6
4 | (United States) G Oliver (France) F Santoro | 6 | 7^{7}
(Netherlands) S Schalken (Belgium) T Vanhoudt | 1 | 6^{4}
(Australia) W Arthurs (Australia) P Hanley | 7 | 6
(United States) D Bowen (Australia) A Fisher | 5 | 4
(Australia) S Huss (Sweden) J Landsberg | 5 | 6 | 6
WC | (Sweden) M Larsson (Sweden) A Vinciguerra | 7 | 2 | 3
(Spain) T Robredo (Thailand) P Srichaphan | 1 | 4
3 | (Australia) J Eagle (Australia) S Stolle | 6 | 6
(Brazil) A Sá (United States) J Thomas | 2 | 1
(South Africa) R Koenig (Japan) T Shimada | 6 | 6
(Argentina) J I Chela (Chile) M Ríos | 6 | 1 | 4
2 | (Zimbabwe) W Black (Zimbabwe) K Ullyett | 4 | 6 | 6

Quarterfinals
1 | (Sweden) J Björkman (Australia) T Woodbridge | 6 | 3 | 6^{3}
(South Africa) J Coetzee (South Africa) C Haggard | 3 | 6 | 7^{7}
4 | (United States) G Oliver (France) F Santoro | 6^{3} | 7^{11} | 2
(Australia) W Arthurs (Australia) P Hanley | 7^{7} | 6^{9} | 6
(Australia) S Huss (Sweden) J Landsberg | 3 | 6 | 6^{5}
3 | (Australia) J Eagle (Australia) S Stolle | 6 | 3 | 7^{7}
(South Africa) R Koenig (Japan) T Shimada | 2 | 4
2 | (Zimbabwe) W Black (Zimbabwe) K Ullyett | 6 | 6

Semifinals
(South Africa) J Coetzee (South Africa) C Haggard | 4 | 6^{2}
(Australia) W Arthurs (Australia) P Hanley | 6 | 7^{7}
3 | (Australia) J Eagle (Australia) S Stolle | 1 | 6^{3}
2 | (Zimbabwe) W Black (Zimbabwe) K Ullyett | 6 | 7^{7}

Final
(Australia) W Arthurs (Australia) P Hanley | 4 | 6 | 6^{4}
2 | (Zimbabwe) W Black (Zimbabwe) K Ullyett | 6 | 2 | 7^{7}
