= Juan Giner =

Spanish tennis player (born 1978)

- Full name: Juan Giner
- Country (sports): Spain
- Born: 28 July 1978 (age 46); Cullera, Spain
- Prize money: $71,812

Singles
- Career record: 2–3
- Career titles: 0
- Highest ranking: No. 169 (21 October 2002)

Doubles
- Career record: 0–2
- Career titles: 0
- Highest ranking: No. 186 (5 November 2001)

Juan Giner (born 28 July 1978) is a former professional tennis player from Spain.

== Biography ==
Giner, son of Juan and Maria-Dolores, was born in Cullera, a town 40 km from Valencia. He began playing tennis aged 10 and trained with other juniors including Marat Safin in Valencia. His best performance as a junior came at the 1996 Orange Bowl where he made the quarter-finals.

In the late 1990s he started competing professionally and in his early satellite career had wins over Juan Carlos Ferrero, Gastón Gaudio and a young Rafael Nadal, who he beat twice in a week at a Spanish tournament in 2001. At Challenger level he won one title, the doubles at Antwerp in 2001, partnering Canada's Jerry Turek. In 2002 he made the quarter-finals at the Romanian Open, an ATP Tour tournament, which he played as a qualifier. He beat Željko Krajan and Irakli Labadze, before being eliminated by top seed Andrei Pavel. He played the qualifying rounds at three Grand Slam tournaments in 2003 and retired from professional tennis in 2005.

Now a coach, Giner runs a tennis club in his native Cullera. Formerly part of the coaching team of Sara Errani, he has also coached David Sánchez and Andrea Arnaboldi.

== Challenger titles ==
=== Doubles: (1) ===
No.	Year	Tournament	Surface	Partner	Opponents	Score
1.	2001	Antwerp, Belgium	Clay	(Canada) Jerry Turek	(Netherlands) Edwin Kempes (Netherlands) Dennis van Scheppingen	6–7^{(4)}, 7–6^{(2)}, 6–3
