= 2003 BCR Open Romania – Singles =

Singles
- 2003 BCR Open Romania

Final
- Champion: (Spain) David Sánchez
- Runner-up: (Chile) Nicolás Massú
- Score: 6–2, 6–2

Details
- Draw: 32
- Seeds: 8

Events
Singles	Doubles
- BCR Open Romania

David Ferrer was the defending champion but lost in the first round to Galo Blanco.

David Sánchez won in the final 6–2, 6–2 against Nicolás Massú.

== Seeds ==
A champion seed is indicated in bold text while text in italics indicates the round in which that seed was eliminated.

1. (Russia) Nikolay Davydenko (first round)
2. (Chile) Nicolás Massú (final)
3. (Armenia) Sargis Sargsian (quarterfinals)
4. (Spain) **David Sánchez (champion)**
5. (France) Paul-Henri Mathieu (quarterfinals)
6. (Spain) David Ferrer (first round)
7. (Spain) Fernando Vicente (first round)
8. (Spain) Alberto Martín (second round)

== Draw ==
Key

- Q = Qualifier
- WC = Wild card
- LL = Lucky loser
- Alt = Alternate
- ITF = ITF entry
- PR = Protected ranking
- SR = Special ranking
- SE = Special exempt
- JE = Junior exempt
- JR = Junior Accelerator Programme entrant
- CO = College Accelerator Programme entrant
- NG = Next Gen Accelerator Program entrant
- w/o = Walkover
- r = Retired
- d = Defaulted

First round
1	(Russia) N Davydenko	5	**7^{7}**	0
Q	(Russia) **I Andreev**	**7**	6^{1}	**6**
Q	(Italy) A Seppi	**6**	3	4
(Argentina) **J Acasuso**	2	**6**	**6**
(Netherlands) **J van Lottum**	3	**6**	**6**
(Spain) A Montañés	**6**	2	0
(Spain) **G Blanco**	**6**	**6**
6	(Spain) D Ferrer	2	3
4	(Spain) **D Sánchez**	**6**	**6**
(Spain) À Corretja	2	3
(Slovakia) K Beck	**6**	1	6^{9}
(Austria) **J Melzer**	4	**6**	**7^{11}**
(Spain) **A Portas**	**6**	**6**
WC	(Romania) G Moraru	3	1
(Austria) S Koubek	2	3
5	(France) **P-H Mathieu**	**6**	**6**
8	(Spain) **A Martín**	**6**	**6**
(France) O Mutis	3	2
(Spain) R Ramírez Hidalgo	3	1
WC	(Romania) **R Sabău**	**6**	**6**
WC	(Romania) **I Moldovan**	**6**	**6**
(Germany) T Behrend	4	1
(Argentina) F Squillari	2	2
3	(Armenia) **S Sargsian**	**6**	**6**
7	(Spain) F Vicente	3	0
(Belgium) **C Rochus**	**6**	**6**
(Romania) **V Hănescu**	4	**6**	**7^{9}**
Q	(Germany) A Waske	**6**	4	6^{7}
(Germany) L Burgsmüller	**7^{7}**	4	2
Q	(Czech Republic) **F Čermák**	6^{3}	**6**	**6**
(Peru) L Horna	6^{4}	3
2	(Chile) **N Massú**	**7^{7}**	**6**

Second round
Q	(Russia) I Andreev	2	**6**	2
(Argentina) **J Acasuso**	**6**	4	**6**
(Netherlands) **J van Lottum**	**6**	**7^{8}**
(Spain) G Blanco	1	6^{6}
4	(Spain) **D Sánchez**	**7^{7}**	**6**
(Austria) J Melzer	6^{2}	4
(Spain) A Portas	2	1
5	(France) **P-H Mathieu**	**6**	**6**
8	(Spain) A Martín	4	**6**	4
WC	(Romania) **R Sabău**	**6**	0	**6**
WC	(Romania) I Moldovan	5	1
3	(Armenia) **S Sargsian**	**7**	**6**
(Belgium) C Rochus	3	4
(Romania) **V Hănescu**	**6**	**6**
Q	(Czech Republic) F Čermák	3	3
2	(Chile) **N Massú**	**6**	**6**

Quarterfinals
(Argentina) **J Acasuso**	4	**6**	**6**
(Netherlands) J van Lottum	**6**	2	3
4	(Spain) **D Sánchez**	**6**	3	**6**
5	(France) P-H Mathieu	4	**6**	3
WC	(Romania) **R Sabău**	2	**6**	**6**
3	(Armenia) S Sargsian	**6**	3	4
(Romania) V Hănescu	4	1
2	(Chile) **N Massú**	**6**	**6**

Semifinals
(Argentina) J Acasuso	**7^{7}**	6^{6}	3
4	(Spain) **D Sánchez**	6^{4}	**7^{8}**	**6**
WC	(Romania) R Sabău	1	4
2	(Chile) **N Massú**	**6**	**6**

Final
4	(Spain) **David Sánchez**	**6**	**6**
2	(Chile) Nicolás Massú	2	2
