= 2002 If Stockholm Open – Singles =

Singles
- 2002 If Stockholm Open

Final
- Champion: (Thailand) Paradorn Srichaphan
- Runner-up: (Chile) Marcelo Ríos
- Score: 6–7^{(2–7)}, 6–0, 6–3, 6–2

Details
- Draw: 32
- Seeds: 8

Events
Singles	Doubles
- If Stockholm Open

Sjeng Schalken was the defending champion but lost in the first round to Taylor Dent.

Paradorn Srichaphan won in the final 6–7^{(2–7)}, 6–0, 6–3, 6–2 against Marcelo Ríos.

== Seeds ==
1. (Australia) Lleyton Hewitt (second round)
2. (Netherlands) Sjeng Schalken (first round)
3. (Argentina) Guillermo Cañas (second round)
4. (Sweden) Thomas Johansson (first round)
5. (Argentina) Juan Ignacio Chela (first round)
6. (Chile) Marcelo Ríos (final)
7. (Thailand) Paradorn Srichaphan (champion)
8. (Germany) Rainer Schüttler (second round)

== Draw ==
Key

- Q = Qualifier
- WC = Wild card
- LL = Lucky loser
- Alt = Alternate
- ITF = ITF entry
- PR = Protected ranking
- SR = Special ranking
- SE = Special exempt
- JE = Junior exempt
- JR = Junior Accelerator Programme entrant
- CO = College Accelerator Programme entrant
- NG = Next Gen Accelerator Program entrant
- w/o = Walkover
- r = Retired
- d = Defaulted

=== Final ===
Semifinals
7	(Thailand) Paradorn Srichaphan	6	6^{5}	6
(Spain) Tommy Robredo	4	7^{7}	1
6	(Chile) Marcelo Ríos	6	7
(Morocco) Hicham Arazi	3	5

Final
7	(Thailand) Paradorn Srichaphan	6^{2}	6	6	6
6	(Chile) Marcelo Ríos	7^{7}	0	3	2

=== Section 1 ===
First round
WC/1	(Australia) L Hewitt	w/o
(Sweden) T Enqvist
(Netherlands) R Sluiter	6	7^{7}
(United States) V Spadea	4	6^{5}
(France) M Llodra	6	6
Q	(Netherlands) J van Lottum	3	2
WC	(Sweden) R Söderling	2	1
7	(Thailand) P Srichaphan	6	6
4	(Sweden) T Johansson	6	3	2
(Spain) T Robredo	3	6	6
(Finland) J Nieminen	3	5
(United States) T Martin	6	7
(Spain) A Portas	3	3
Q	(Sweden) J Johansson	6	6
(France) F Santoro	6	6
5	(Argentina) J I Chela	1	3

Second round
WC/1	(Australia) L Hewitt	3	3
(Netherlands) R Sluiter	6	6
(France) M Llodra	4	3
7	(Thailand) P Srichaphan	6	6
(Spain) T Robredo	6	3	7^{7}
(United States) T Martin	4	6	6^{2}
Q	(Sweden) J Johansson	7^{8}	4	6^{5}
(France) F Santoro	6^{6}	6	7^{7}

Quarterfinals
(Netherlands) R Sluiter	6	3	4
7	(Thailand) P Srichaphan	4	6	6
(Spain) T Robredo	3	6	6
(France) F Santoro	6	1	4

Semifinals
7	(Thailand) P Srichaphan	6	6^{5}	6
(Spain) T Robredo	4	7^{7}	1

=== Section 2 ===
First round
6	(Chile) M Ríos	6	6^{5}	6
(Australia) W Arthurs	4	7^{7}	1
(United States) J-M Gambill	6	3	7^{10}
(Belgium) O Rochus	1	6	6^{8}
Q	(Slovakia) K Beck	6^{5}	1
Q	(Sweden) A Vinciguerra	7^{7}	6
(Brazil) A Sá	1	7^{8}	3
3	(Argentina) G Cañas	6	6^{6}	6
8	(Germany) R Schüttler	6	6
(Spain) A Montañés	1	2
(Chile) N Massú	6	3	6
(Sweden) J Björkman	3	6	3
WC	(Sweden) M Norman	2	2
(Morocco) H Arazi	6	6
(United States) T Dent	7^{7}	6
2	(Netherlands) S Schalken	6^{3}	4

Second round
6	(Chile) M Ríos	6
(United States) J-M Gambill	2	r
Q	(Sweden) A Vinciguerra	7^{7}	6
3	(Argentina) G Cañas	6^{5}	2
8	(Germany) R Schüttler	6	6^{4}	3
(Chile) N Massú	4	7^{7}	6
(Morocco) H Arazi	6	6
(United States) T Dent	4	2

Quarterfinals
6	(Chile) M Ríos	6	7^{7}
Q	(Sweden) A Vinciguerra	3	6^{3}
(Chile) N Massú	5	1
(Morocco) H Arazi	7	6

Semifinals
6	(Chile) M Ríos	6	7
(Morocco) H Arazi	3	5
