= Karsten Braasch =

German professional tennis player

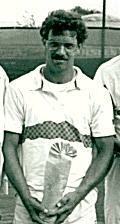
- Karsten Braasch in 1987
- Country (sports): Germany
- Residence: Ratingen, North Rhine-Westphalia, Germany
- Born: 14 July 1967 (age 59) Marl, North Rhine-Westphalia, West Germany
- Height: 1.80 m (5 ft 11 in)
- Turned pro: 1987
- Retired: 2005
- Plays: Left-handed (one-handed backhand)
- Prize money: $1,497,244

Singles
- Career record: 68–96
- Career titles: 0
- Highest ranking: No. 38 (13 June 1994)

Grand Slam singles results
- Australian Open: 3R (1997)
- French Open: 1R (1992, 1994, 1995)
- Wimbledon: 2R (1992, 1994)
- US Open: 3R (1993)

Doubles
- Career record: 103–128
- Career titles: 6
- Highest ranking: No. 36 (10 November 1997)

Grand Slam doubles results
- Australian Open: 3R (2001, 2004)
- French Open: QF (1997, 2004)
- Wimbledon: 2R (1998, 1999, 2002)
- US Open: 2R (1998)

Mixed doubles
- Career record: 7–7
- Career titles: 0

Grand Slam mixed doubles results
- French Open: 3R (1997)
- Wimbledon: 3R (1997, 2001)

Karsten Braasch (born 14 July 1967) is a German former professional tennis player. His highest ATP singles ranking was world No. 38, which he reached in June 1994. His career-high in doubles was world No. 36, achieved in November 1997. He won six ATP doubles titles and made one ATP singles final in 1994. He was well-noted for his service motion and his habit of smoking during changeovers.

== Career ==
=== Juniors ===
As a junior, Braasch only played one tournament which was 1985 Junior Wimbledon. He reached the second round, before losing to ninth seed Brett Custer in straight sets.

=== Pro career ===
Braasch turned pro in 1987 but his first ATP ranking dates back to 1986. He played solely on the ATP Challenger Tour for the beginning of his career with moderate results. He made his ATP main draw debut in 1989 at the BMW Open after qualifying for the main draw where he lost in the first round to Andrei Cherkasov in straight sets. He recorded his first ATP main draw win two months later in his second tournament at the Hall of Fame Open where he defeated Luiz Mattar in the first round in straight sets.

Braasch broke into the top 100 in March 1992, after winning a Challenger tournament. Soon after, he made his Grand Slam debut at the 1992 French Open where he lost in the first round to world No. 10 Carlos Costa in four sets. He won his first Grand Slam match at 1992 Wimbledon where he defeated Diego Nargiso in five sets.

Braasch reached the third round 1993 US Open which is tied as his best result at a Grand Slam. He lost in the third round to world No. 8 Andrei Medvedev in straight sets.

At the 1994 Ordina Open. Braasch reached the first and only ATP singles final of his career. He lost in the final to top seed Richard Krajicek in straight sets. The result would push his ranking to a career-high of No. 38 on 13 June 1994.

Braasch played world No. 1, Andre Agassi, in the first round of the 1995 French Open whom he lost to in straight sets. He then played world No. 2, Pete Sampras, in the first round of 1995 Wimbledon whom he also lost to, in four sets.

Braasch's ranking began to slip in late 1995 and he dropped to a low of 496 in September 1996. He then qualified for the 1997 Australian Open and reached the third round to match his best result at a Grand Slam and defeating 12th seed Magnus Gustafsson en route. He lost in the third round to Jonas Björkman in straight sets. As a result, his ranking jumped 257 spots from 488 to 231.

In 1997, Braasch began to focus more on doubles than on singles. He made his first ATP doubles final at the 1997 Hong Kong Open partnering Jeff Tarango and followed the result up by making the 1997 French Open quarterfinals partnering Jens Knippschild. One month later, he won his first ATP doubles title and first ATP title at the 1997 Gerry Weber Open partnering former Wimbledon champion Michael Stich. Braasch would go on to make six more doubles finals and win two more titles. He reached a career-high doubles ranking of 36 on 10 November 1997.

Braasch started to become very inactive in singles and dropped out of the singles rankings in 2002 for a brief period and then permanently in 2004. However, he was still experiencing doubles success which included his last doubles title at the 2003 Romania Open and another Grand Slam quarterfinal at the 2004 French Open. He partnered Sargis Sargsian for both tournament.

Braasch retired from tennis in 2005 after his doubles ranking started to slip. However, he returned for a brief doubles stint in 2007.

=== After retirement ===
Braasch played senior tennis and reached a high ranking of No. 3 in 2017.

=== Match against the Williams sisters ===
Braasch competed in a "Battle of the Sexes" contest against the Williams sisters (Venus and Serena) at the 1998 Australian Open when he was ranked 203. Braasch was described by one journalist as "a man whose training regime centred around a pack of cigarettes and more than a couple bottles of ice cold lager". He nonetheless defeated both sisters, playing a single set against each, beating Serena 6–1 and Venus 6–2. Braasch was thirty years old at the time, while Venus and Serena were seventeen and sixteen, respectively.

== Personal life ==
Braasch began playing tennis at the age of six. He is also a fan of the NBA and his favorite team is the Charlotte Hornets. He also makes fun of his unorthodox serve motion stating, "When I see my serve on TV, I have to laugh at myself. As long as it is effective, I don't have to change anything." He was also elected onto the ATP players council in 1995–1996.

== ATP Tour finals ==
=== Singles: 1 (runner-up) ===
Legend (singles)
Grand Slam (0)
Tennis Masters Cup (0)
ATP Masters Series (0)
ATP Tour (1)

| Result | Date | Tournament | Surface | Opponent | Score |
|---|---|---|---|---|---|
| Loss | Jun 1994 | Rosmalen, Netherlands | Grass | (Netherlands) Richard Krajicek | 3–6, 4–6 |

=== Doubles: 9 (6 titles, 3 runner-ups) ===
| Result | W/L | Date | Tournament | Surface | Partner | Opponents | Score |
|---|---|---|---|---|---|---|---|
| Win | 1–0 | Jun 1997 | Halle Open | Grass | (Germany) Michael Stich | (South Africa) David Adams (South Africa) Marius Barnard | 7–6, 6–3 |
| Win | 2–0 | Jul 2001 | Swedish Open | Clay | (Germany) Jens Knippschild | (Sweden) Simon Aspelin (Australia) Andrew Kratzmann | 7–6^{(7–3)}, 4–6, 7–6^{(7–5)} |
| Win | 3–0 | Sep 2001 | Salem Open | Hard | (Brazil) André Sá | (Czech Republic) Petr Luxa (Czech Republic) Radek Štěpánek | 6–0, 7–5 |
| Win | 4–0 | Feb 2002 | Milan Indoor | Carpet | (Russia) Andrei Olhovskiy | (France) Julien Boutter (Belarus) Max Mirnyi | 3–6, 7–6^{(7–5)}, [12–10] |
| Win | 5–0 | Apr 2002 | Estoril Open | Clay | (Russia) Andrei Olhovskiy | (Sweden) Simon Aspelin (Australia) Andrew Kratzmann | 6–3, 6–3 |
| Win | 6–0 | Sep 2003 | Romanian Open | Clay | (Armenia) Sargis Sargsian | (Sweden) Simon Aspelin (South Africa) Jeff Coetzee | 7–6^{(9–7)}, 6–2 |
| Loss | 6–1 | Apr 1997 | Salem Open | Hard | (United States) Jeff Tarango | (Czech Republic) Martin Damm (Czech Republic) Daniel Vacek | 3–6, 4–6 |
| Loss | 6–2 | May 1997 | BMW Open | Clay | (Germany) Jens Knippschild | (Argentina) Pablo Albano (Spain) Àlex Corretja | 6–3, 5–7, 2–6 |
| Loss | 6–3 | Oct 1997 | Swiss Indoors | Carpet (i) | (United States) Jim Grabb | (United Kingdom) Tim Henman (Switzerland) Marc Rosset | 6–7, 7–6, 6–7 |
