= David Sánchez (tennis) =

Spanish tennis player (born 1978)

- Country (sports): Spain
- Residence: Zamora, Spain
- Born: 20 April 1978 (age 47) Zamora, Spain
- Height: 1.83 m (6 ft 0 in)
- Turned pro: 1997
- Retired: 2005
- Plays: Right-handed (one-handed backhand)
- Coach: José Luis Aparisi
- Prize money: $1,451,767

Singles
- Career record: 86–118
- Career titles: 2
- Highest ranking: No. 41 (24 February 2003)

Grand Slam singles results
- Australian Open: 2R (2003, 2004)
- French Open: 3R (2001, 2005)
- Wimbledon: 1R (2001, 2002, 2003, 2004)
- US Open: 2R (2004)

Doubles
- Career record: 9–21
- Career titles: 0
- Highest ranking: No. 180 (4 October 2004)

Grand Slam doubles results
- Australian Open: 1R (2003, 2004)
- French Open: 1R (2004)
- Wimbledon: 1R (2004)
- US Open: 2R (2004)
- Last updated on: 21 December 2021.

David Sánchez Muñoz (Spanish pronunciation: [daˈβið ˈsantʃeθ muˈɲoθ]; born 20 April 1978) is a Spanish tennis coach and a former professional player. He reached his career high singles ranking of World No. 41 on 24 February 2003.

== Career ==
During his third round run at the 2001 French Open, Sánchez defeated the previous year's finalist Magnus Norman and former champion Carlos Moyá in five sets, and took a set off Roger Federer.

In 2003 he won both the Open Romania and the Movistar Open.

== ATP career finals ==
=== Singles: 2 (2 titles) ===
Legend Grand Slam Tournaments (0–0) ATP World Tour Finals (0–0) ATP Masters Series (0–0) ATP Championship Series (0–0) ATP International Series (2–0)	Finals by surface Hard (0–0) Clay (2–0) Grass (0–0) Carpet (0–0)	Finals by setting Outdoors (2–1) Indoors (0–0)

Result	W–L	Date	Tournament	Tier	Surface	Opponent	Score
Win	1–0	Feb 2003	Viña del Mar (Chile)	International Series	Clay	(Chile) Marcelo Ríos	1–6, 6–3, 6–3
Win	2–0	Sep 2003	Bucharest (Romania)	International Series	Clay	(Chile) Nicolás Massú	6–2, 6–2

== ATP Challenger and ITF Futures finals ==
=== Singles: 12 (5–7) ===
Legend ATP Challenger (5–7) ITF Futures (0–0)	Finals by surface Hard (0–0) Clay (5–7) Grass (0–0) Carpet (0–0)

Result	W–L	Date	Tournament	Tier	Surface	Opponent	Score
Win	1–0	Sep 1999	Brașov, Romania	Challenger	Clay	(France) Thierry Guardiola	6–2, 0–6, 6–2
Win	2–0	Mar 2000	Lisbon, Portugal	Challenger	Clay	(Czech Republic) Jiří Vaněk	6–4, 3–6, 6–2
Win	3–0	Jun 2000	Lugano, Switzerland	Challenger	Clay	(Hungary) Attila Sávolt	6–3, 6–2
Loss	3–1	Jul 2000	Ulm, Germany	Challenger	Clay	(Spain) Germán Puentes	3–6, 3–6
Loss	3–2	Sep 2000	Graz, Austria	Challenger	Clay	(Czech Republic) Michal Tabara	5–7, 0–6
Loss	3–3	Apr 2001	Paget, Bermuda	Challenger	Clay	(Argentina) José Acasuso	6–7^{(4–7)}, 1–6
Win	4–3	Sep 2001	Kyiv, Ukraine	Challenger	Clay	(Hungary) Attila Sávolt	4–6, 6–3, 6–3
Loss	4–4	Oct 2001	Cagliari, Italy	Challenger	Clay	(Spain) Fernando Vicente	6–4, 2–6, 4–6
Win	5–4	Jun 2002	Braunschweig, Germany	Challenger	Clay	(Argentina) José Acasuso	5–1 ret.
Loss	5–5	Sep 2002	Szczecin, Poland	Challenger	Clay	(Russia) Nikolay Davydenko	3–6, 3–6
Loss	5–6	Aug 2003	San Marino, San Marino	Challenger	Clay	(Italy) Alessio di Mauro	3–6, 2–3 ret.
Loss	5–7	Sep 2004	Szczecin, Poland	Challenger	Clay	(Argentina) Edgardo Massa	2–6, 2–6

== Performance timeline ==
Key
W	F	SF	QF	#R	RR	Q#	DNQ	A	NH

(W) winner; (F) finalist; (SF) semifinalist; (QF) quarterfinalist; (#R) rounds 4, 3, 2, 1; (RR) round-robin stage; (Q#) qualification round; (DNQ) did not qualify; (A) absent; (NH) not held; (SR) strike rate (events won / competed); (W–L) win–loss record.

=== Singles ===
Tournament	1998	1999	2000	2001	2002	2003	2004	2005	SR	W–L	Win %
Grand Slam tournaments
Australian Open	Q2	A	A	1R	1R	2R	2R	1R	0 / 5	2–5	29%
French Open	Q1	A	Q3	3R	2R	1R	1R	3R	0 / 5	5–5	50%
Wimbledon	A	A	A	1R	1R	1R	1R	A	0 / 4	0–4	0%
US Open	A	A	1R	1R	1R	1R	2R	A	0 / 5	1–5	17%
Win–loss	0–0	0–0	0–1	2–4	1–4	1–4	2–4	2–2	0 / 19	8–19	30%
ATP Masters Series
Indian Wells	A	A	A	Q1	1R	1R	2R	A	0 / 3	1–3	25%
Miami	A	A	A	A	1R	1R	2R	A	0 / 3	1–3	25%
Monte Carlo	A	A	A	A	A	1R	2R	Q2	0 / 2	1–2	33%
Hamburg	A	A	A	Q2	2R	2R	1R	1R	0 / 4	2–4	33%
Rome	A	A	A	A	A	1R	3R	Q1	0 / 2	2–2	50%
Canada	A	A	A	A	A	A	1R	A	0 / 1	0–1	0%
Cincinnati	A	A	A	A	A	1R	A	A	0 / 1	0–1	0%
Madrid	Not Held				Q1	A	1R	A	0 / 1	0–1	0%
Win–loss	0–0	0–0	0–0	0–0	1–3	1–6	5–7	0–1	0 / 17	7–17	29%

== Wins over top 10 ranked players ==
Season	2001	2002	2003	Total
Wins	1	1	1	3

=== Wins over Top 10s per season ===
#	Player	Rank	Event	Surface	Rd	Score
2001
1.	(Sweden) Magnus Norman	9	French Open, Paris, France	Clay	1R	4–6, 4–6, 7–6^{(7–4)}, 6–1, 6–2
2002
2.	(Spain) Juan Carlos Ferrero	8	Gstaad, Switzerland	Clay	2R	5–7, 6–4, 6–3
2003
3.	(Thailand) Paradorn Srichaphan	10	Barcelona, Spain	Clay	2R	6–0, 6–2
