= 2001 Gelsor Open Romania =

Men's tennis tournament

- Date: 10–16 September
- Edition: 9th
- Category: International Series
- Draw: 32S / 16D
- Prize money: $375,000
- Surface: Clay / outdoor
- Location: Bucharest, Romania
- Venue: Arenele BNR

Champions

Singles
- (Morocco) Younes El Aynaoui

Doubles
- (North Macedonia) Aleksandar Kitinov / (Sweden) Johan Landsberg
← 2000 ·	Romanian Open	· 2002 →

The 2001 Gelsor Open Romania was a men'a tennis tournament played on outdoor clay courts at the Arenele BNR in Bucharest, Romania and was part of the International Series of the 2001 ATP Tour. The tournament ran from 10 September through 16 September 2001. Seventh-seeded Younes El Aynaoui won the singles title.

== Finals ==
=== Singles ===
(Morocco) Younes El Aynaoui defeated (Spain) Albert Montañés 7–6^{(7–5)}, 7–6^{(7–2)}

- It was El Aynaoui's only title of the year and the 2nd of his career.

=== Doubles ===
(North Macedonia) Aleksandar Kitinov / (Sweden) Johan Landsberg defeated (Argentina) Pablo Albano / (Germany) Marc-Kevin Goellner 6–4, 6–7^{(5–7)}, [10–6]

- It was Kitinov's only title of the year and the 3rd of his career. It was Landsberg's only title of the year and the 2nd of his career.
