= 2006 BCR Open Romania =

- Date: 11–17 September
- Edition: 14th
- Category: International Series
- Draw: 32S / 16D
- Prize money: $355,000
- Surface: Clay / outdoor
- Location: Bucharest, Romania
- Venue: Arenele BNR

Champions

Singles
- (Austria) Jürgen Melzer

Doubles
- (Poland) Mariusz Fyrstenberg / (Poland) Marcin Matkowski
← 2005 ·	BCR Open Romania	· 2007 →

The 2006 BCR Open Romania was a men's tennis tournament played on outdoor clay courts. It was the 14th edition of the event known that year as the BCR Open Romania, and was part of the International Series of the 2006 ATP Tour. It took place at the Arenele BNR in Bucharest, Romania, from 11 September through 17 September 2006. Unseeded Jürgen Melzer won the singles title.

== Finals ==
=== Singles ===
(Austria) Jürgen Melzer defeated (Italy) Filippo Volandri, 6–1, 7–5

- It was Melzer's first singles win of his career.

=== Doubles ===
(Poland) Mariusz Fyrstenberg / (Poland) Marcin Matkowski defeated (Argentina) Martín García / (Peru) Luis Horna, 6–7^{(5–7)}, 7–6^{(7–5)}, [10–8]
