= 2005 BCR Open Romania – Doubles =

Doubles
- 2005 BCR Open Romania

Final
- Champions: (Argentina) José Acasuso (Argentina) Sebastián Prieto
- Runners-up: (Romania) Victor Hănescu (Romania) Andrei Pavel
- Score: 6–3, 4–6, 6–3

Events
Singles	Doubles
← 2004 ·	Romanian Open	· 2006 →

Lucas Arnold Ker and Mariano Hood were the defending champions, but Arnold Ker did not compete this year. Hood teamed up with Martín García and lost in the quarterfinals to Juan Ignacio Chela and Luis Horna.

José Acasuso and Sebastián Prieto won the title by defeating Victor Hănescu and Andrei Pavel 6–3, 4–6, 6–3 in the final.

== Seeds ==
1. (Argentina) Martín García / (Argentina) Mariano Hood (quarterfinals)
2. (Austria) Julian Knowle / (Germany) Michael Kohlmann (first round)
3. (Argentina) José Acasuso / (Argentina) Sebastián Prieto (champions)
4. (Poland) Mariusz Fyrstenberg / (Poland) Marcin Matkowski (quarterfinals)

== Draw ==
=== Key ===
- Q = Qualifier
- WC = Wild card
- LL = Lucky loser
- Alt = Alternate
- ITF = ITF entry
- PR = Protected ranking
- SR = Special ranking
- SE = Special exempt
- JE = Junior exempt
- JR = Junior Accelerator Programme entrant
- CO = College Accelerator Programme entrant
- NG = Next Gen Accelerator Program entrant
- w/o = Walkover
- r = Retired
- d = Defaulted

=== Draw ===
First round
1	(Argentina) M García (Argentina) M Hood	6	5^{6}	6
WC	(Romania) V Ioniță (Romania) R Sabău	1	6^{8}	2
(Argentina) JI Chela (Peru) L Horna	6	6
(Germany) T Behrend (Germany) A Waske	2	2
3	(Argentina) J Acasuso (Argentina) S Prieto	6	6
(South Africa) J Coetzee (South Africa) C Haggard	4	4
(Germany) F Mayer (Netherlands) R Wassen	6	6^{7}
(France) PH Mathieu (Belgium) R Rochus	4	5^{1}
(Romania) V Hănescu (Romania) A Pavel	6	6^{7}
(Czech Republic) P Pála (Czech Republic) D Škoch	4	5^{3}
(Spain) N Almagro (Spain) A Martín	2	2
4	(Poland) M Fyrstenberg (Poland) M Matkowski	6	6
WC	(Romania) I Moldovan (Romania) G Moraru	6	6
(Argentina) C Berlocq (Argentina) M Puerta	1	2
(Italy) D Sanguinetti (Belgium) T Vanhoudt	6	6^{7}
2	(Austria) J Knowle (Germany) M Kohlmann	4	5^{0}

Quarterfinals
1	(Argentina) M García (Argentina) M Hood	3	3
(Argentina) JI Chela (Peru) L Horna	6	6
3	(Argentina) J Acasuso (Argentina) S Prieto	6	6
(Germany) F Mayer (Netherlands) R Wassen	1	2
(Romania) V Hănescu (Romania) A Pavel	6	6^{7}
4	(Poland) M Fyrstenberg (Poland) M Matkowski	2	5^{3}
WC	(Romania) I Moldovan (Romania) G Moraru	6^{10}	6
(Italy) D Sanguinetti (Belgium) T Vanhoudt	5^{8}	4

Semifinals
(Argentina) JI Chela (Peru) L Horna	3	4
3	(Argentina) J Acasuso (Argentina) S Prieto	6	6
(Romania) V Hănescu (Romania) A Pavel	6	6
WC	(Romania) I Moldovan (Romania) G Moraru	4	4

Final
3	(Argentina) J Acasuso (Argentina) S Prieto	6	4	6
(Romania) V Hănescu (Romania) A Pavel	3	6	3
