= 2007 BCR Open Romania =

- Date: 10–16 September
- Edition: 15th
- Category: International Series
- Draw: 32S / 16D
- Prize money: $391,000
- Surface: Clay / outdoor
- Location: Bucharest, Romania
- Venue: Arenele BNR

Champions

Singles
- (France) Gilles Simon

Doubles
- (Austria) Oliver Marach / (Slovakia) Michal Mertiňák
← 2006 ·	BCR Open Romania	· 2008 →

The 2007 BCR Open Romania was a men's tennis tournament played on outdoor clay courts. It was the 15th edition of the event known that year as the BCR Open Romania, and was part of the International Series of the 2007 ATP Tour. It took place at the Arenele BNR in Bucharest, Romania, from 10 September through 16 September 2007.

The singles field was headlined by ATP No. 26, Båstad runner-up and Valencia titlist Nicolás Almagro, Rome Masters and Båstad semifinalist Filippo Volandri, and Valencia and Kitzbühel finalist Potito Starace. Other top seeded players were Las Vegas runner-up Jürgen Melzer, French Open quarterfinalist, Båstad semifinalist Igor Andreev, Gilles Simon, Fabrice Santoro and Albert Montañés.

Sixth-seeded Gilles Simon won the singles title.

== Finals ==
=== Singles ===
(France) Gilles Simon defeated (Romania) Victor Hănescu, 4–6, 6–3, 6–2

- It was Gilles Simon's 2nd title of the year, and overall.

=== Doubles ===
(Austria) Oliver Marach / (Slovakia) Michal Mertiňák defeated (Argentina) Martín García / (Argentina) Sebastián Prieto, 7–6^{(7–2)}, 7–6^{(10–8)}
