= 2005 BCR Open Romania – Singles =

Singles
- 2005 BCR Open Romania

Final
- Champion: (France) Florent Serra
- Runner-up: (Russia) Igor Andreev
- Score: 6–3, 6–4

Details
- Draw: 32 (3WC/4Q)
- Seeds: 8

Events
| Singles | Doubles |
| ← 2004 · | Romanian Open | · 2006 → |

José Acasuso was the defending champion, but lost in the second round to Rubén Ramírez Hidalgo.

Florent Serra won the title by defeating Igor Andreev 6–3, 6–4 in the final.

== Seeds ==
1. (Argentina) Mariano Puerta (quarterfinals)
2. (Italy) Filippo Volandri (second round)
3. (Romania) Andrei Pavel (semifinals)
4. (Romania) Victor Hănescu (semifinals)
5. (France) Gaël Monfils (first round)
6. (Argentina) José Acasuso (second round)
7. (France) Paul-Henri Mathieu (quarterfinals)
8. (Spain) Fernando Verdasco (second round)

== Draw ==
=== Key ===
- Q = Qualifier
- WC = Wild card
- LL = Lucky loser
- Alt = Alternate
- ITF = ITF entry
- PR = Protected ranking
- SR = Special ranking
- SE = Special exempt
- JE = Junior exempt
- JR = Junior Accelerator Programme entrant
- CO = College Accelerator Programme entrant
- NG = Next Gen Accelerator Program entrant
- w/o = Walkover
- r = Retired
- d = Defaulted

=== Finals ===
Semifinals
(Russia) Igor Andreev | 4 | 7^{7} | 6
4 | (Romania) Victor Hănescu | 6 | 6^{2} | 3
3/WC | (Romania) Andrei Pavel | 7^{7} | 2 | 3
(France) Florent Serra | 6^{5} | 6 | 6

Final
(Russia) Igor Andreev | 3 | 4
(France) Florent Serra | 6 | 6

=== Top half ===
First round
1/WC | (Argentina) M Puerta | 7 | 6
(Serbia and Montenegro) J Tipsarević | 5 | 2
(Peru) L Horna | 3 | 6 | 2
(Spain) G García López | 6 | 3 | 6
(Germany) A Waske | 4 | 6^{4}
(Russia) I Andreev | 6 | 7^{7}
(Spain) A Montañés | 3 | 6 | 6
5 | (France) G Monfils | 6 | 1 | 4
4 | (Romania) V Hănescu | 6 | 6
(Italy) P Starace | 3 | 2
(Italy) D Sanguinetti | 6 | 6
(Romania) R Sabău | 4 | 3
(Spain) N Almagro | 6^{8} | 1
Q | (Spain) R Ramírez Hidalgo | 7^{10} | 6
(Argentina) JI Chela | 2 | 4
6 | (Argentina) J Acasuso | 6 | 6

Second round
1/WC | (Argentina) M Puerta | 6 | 6
(Spain) G García López | 2 | 4
(Russia) I Andreev | 6 | 6
(Spain) A Montañés | 2 | 2
4 | (Romania) V Hănescu | 6 | 6
(Italy) D Sanguinetti | 2 | 3
Q | (Spain) R Ramírez Hidalgo | 6 | 7
6 | (Argentina) J Acasuso | 4 | 5

Quarterfinals
1/WC | (Argentina) M Puerta | 6 | 1 | 1
(Russia) I Andreev | 4 | 6 | 6
4 | (Romania) V Hănescu | 6 | 6
Q | (Spain) R Ramírez Hidalgo | 4 | 4

Semifinals
(Russia) I Andreev | 4 | 7^{7} | 6
4 | (Romania) V Hănescu | 6 | 6^{2} | 3

=== Bottom half ===
First round
8 | (Spain) F Verdasco | 6 | 6
(Argentina) M Zabaleta | 2 | 4
(Germany) F Mayer | 6 | 6
(Spain) Ó Hernández | 2 | 0
Q | (Austria) O Marach | 6 | 6
Q | (Poland) M Fyrstenberg | 4 | 4
(Spain) A Martín | 4 | 4
3/WC | (Romania) A Pavel | 6 | 6
7 | (France) PH Mathieu | 2 | 6 | 6
(Spain) D Sánchez | 6 | 2 | 1
Q | (Spain) A Portas | 6 | 6
(Belgium) C Rochus | 4 | 1
(France) F Serra | 3 | 7^{7} | 6
WC | (Romania) V Crivoi | 6 | 6^{5} | 1
(Germany) T Behrend | 2 | 4
2 | (Italy) F Volandri | 6 | 6

Second round
8 | (Spain) F Verdasco | 5 | 6^{7}
(Germany) F Mayer | 7 | 7^{9}
Q | (Austria) O Marach | 6 | 6^{2} | 4
3/WC | (Romania) A Pavel | 3 | 7^{7} | 6
7 | (France) PH Mathieu | 6 | 6
Q | (Spain) A Portas | 2 | 0
(France) F Serra | 1 | 6 | 6
2 | (Italy) F Volandri | 6 | 4 | 3

Quarterfinals
(Germany) F Mayer | 5 | 6^{4}
3/WC | (Romania) A Pavel | 7 | 7^{7}
7 | (France) PH Mathieu | 3 | 1
(France) F Serra | 6 | 6

Semifinals
3/WC | (Romania) A Pavel | 7^{7} | 2 | 3
(France) F Serra | 6^{5} | 6 | 6
