= 2008 BCR Open Romania =

- Date: 8–14 September
- Edition: 16th
- Category: International Series
- Draw: 32S / 16D
- Prize money: €349,000
- Surface: Clay / outdoor
- Location: Bucharest, Romania
- Venue: Arenele BNR

Champions

Singles
- (France) Gilles Simon

Doubles
- (France) Nicolas Devilder / (France) Paul-Henri Mathieu
← 2007 ·	BCR Open Romania	· 2009 →

The 2008 BCR Open Romania was a men's tennis tournament played on outdoor clay courts. It was the 16th edition of the event known that year as the BCR Open Romania, and was part of the International Series of the 2008 ATP Tour. It took place at the Arenele BNR in Bucharest, Romania, from 8 September through 14 September 2008.

The singles field was led by ATP No. 12, Stuttgart runner-up, Canada Masters quarterfinalist Richard Gasquet, Casablanca and Indianapolis titlist, and Bucharest defending champion Gilles Simon, and Costa do Sauípe and Acapulco winner, Valencia finalist Nicolás Almagro. Other seeded players were Marseille and Munich semifinalist Paul-Henri Mathieu, French Open quarterfinalist Ernests Gulbis, Carlos Moyá, Marcel Granollers and José Acasuso.

Second-seeded and defending champion Gilles Simon won the singles title.

== Finals ==
=== Singles ===
(France) Gilles Simon defeated (Spain) Carlos Moyá, 6–3, 6–4

- It was Gilles Simon's 3rd title of the year, and his 5th overall. It was his 2nd consecutive win at the event.

=== Doubles ===
(France) Nicolas Devilder / (France) Paul-Henri Mathieu defeated (Poland) Mariusz Fyrstenberg / (Poland) Marcin Matkowski, 7–6^{(7–4)}, 6–7^{(9–11)}, [22–20]
