= 2005 BCR Open Romania =

- Date: 12–19 September
- Edition: 13th
- Category: International Series
- Draw: 32S / 16D
- Prize money: $ 355,000
- Surface: Clay / outdoor
- Location: Bucharest, Romania
- Venue: Arenele BNR

Champions

Singles
- (France) Florent Serra

Doubles
- (Argentina) José Acasuso / (Argentina) Sebastián Prieto
| ← 2004 · | BCR Open Romania | · 2006 → |

The 2005 BCR Open Romania was a men's tennis tournament played on outdoor clay courts. It was the 14th edition of the event known that year as the BCR Open Romania, and was part of the International Series of the 2005 ATP Tour. It took place at the Arenele BNR in Bucharest, Romania, from 12 September until 19 September 2006. Unseeded Florent Serra won the singles title.

== Finals ==
=== Singles ===
(France) Florent Serra defeated (Russia) Igor Andreev 6–3, 6–4

- It was the first ATP tournament for Serra in his career.

=== Doubles ===
(Argentina) José Acasuso / (Argentina) Sebastián Prieto defeated (Romania) Victor Hănescu / (Romania) Andrei Pavel 6–3, 4–6, 6–3

- It was the 3rd title for Acasuso and the 6th title for Prieto in their respective doubles careers.
- It was also the 2nd title for the pair during this season, after their win at Stuttgart.
