= 2009 Città di Como Challenger =

- Date: August 31 – September 6
- Edition: 4th
- Location: Como, Italy

Champions

Singles
- (Ukraine) Oleksandr Dolgopolov Jr.

Doubles
- (Italy) Marco Crugnola / (Italy) Alessandro Motti
- Città di Como Challenger

The 2009 Città di Como Challenger was a professional tennis tournament played on outdoor red clay courts. It was the fourth edition of the tournament which was part of the 2009 ATP Challenger Tour. It took place in Como, Italy between 31 August and 6 September 2009.

== Singles entrants ==
=== Seeds ===
Nationality	Player	Ranking*	Seeding
ITA	Paolo Lorenzi	136	1
RSA	Kevin Anderson	148	2
FRA	Alexandre Sidorenko	153	3
ARG	Eduardo Schwank	166	4
ITA	Tomas Tenconi	170	5
FRA	Olivier Patience	181	6
UKR	Oleksandr Dolgopolov Jr.	192	7
ITA	Marco Crugnola	199	8

- Rankings are as of August 24, 2009.

=== Other entrants ===
The following players received wildcards into the singles main draw:

- (Argentina) Carlos Berlocq
- (Italy) Daniele Bracciali
- (Italy) Thomas Fabbiano
- (Italy) Matteo Trevisan

The following players received wildcards into the singles main draw:

- (Portugal) Leonardo Tavares

The following players received entry from the qualifying draw:

- (France) Jonathan Eysseric
- (Chile) Adrián García
- (Tunisia) Malek Jaziri
- (Philippines) Cecil Mamiit

== Champions ==
=== Singles ===
(Ukraine) Oleksandr Dolgopolov Jr. def. (Argentina) Juan-Martín Aranguren, 7–5, 7–6(5)

=== Doubles ===
(Italy) Marco Crugnola / (Italy) Alessandro Motti def. (Philippines) Treat Conrad Huey / (India) Harsh Mankad, 7–6(3), 6–3
