= 2009 Città di Como Challenger – Singles =

Singles
- 2009 Città di Como Challenger

Final
- Champion: (Ukraine) Oleksandr Dolgopolov Jr.
- Runner-up: (Argentina) Juan-Martín Aranguren
- Score: 7–5, 7–6(5)

Events
Singles	Doubles
← 2008 ·	Città di Como Challenger	· 2010 →

Diego Junqueira was the defending champion, but he chose to not participate this year.
Oleksandr Dolgopolov Jr. defeated Juan-Martín Aranguren 7–5, 7–6(5) in the final.

== Seeds ==
1. (Italy) Paolo Lorenzi (semifinals)
2. (South Africa) Kevin Anderson (second round)
3. (France) Alexandre Sidorenko (second round)
4. (Argentina) Eduardo Schwank (first round)
5. (Italy) Tomas Tenconi (quarterfinals)
6. (France) Olivier Patience (semifinals)
7. (Ukraine) Oleksandr Dolgopolov Jr. (champion)
8. (Italy) Marco Crugnola (quarterfinals)

== Draw ==
=== Key ===
- Q = Qualifier
- WC = Wild card
- LL = Lucky loser
- Alt = Alternate
- SE = Special exempt
- PR = Protected ranking
- ITF = ITF entry
- JE = Junior exempt
- w/o = Walkover
- r = Retired
- d = Defaulted
- SR = Special ranking

=== Final four ===
Semifinals
1	(Italy) Paolo Lorenzi	4	2
7	(Ukraine) Oleksandr Dolgopolov Jr.	6	6
6	(France) Olivier Patience	6^{6}	6	4
(Argentina) Juan-Martín Aranguren	7	4	6

Final
7	(Ukraine) Oleksandr Dolgopolov Jr.	7	7
(Argentina) Juan-Martín Aranguren	5	6^{5}

=== Top half ===
First round
1	(Italy) P Lorenzi	7	6
(Netherlands) J Huta Galung	6^{3}	1
(Serbia) B Pašanski	6	6
(Italy) E Burzi	4	4
Q	(Chile) A García	6	5	6^{3}
Q	(Tunisia) M Jaziri	1	7	7
WC	(Italy) D Bracciali	1	6	4
8	(Italy) M Crugnola	6	3	6
4	(Argentina) E Schwank	3	2
(Italy) F Volandri	6	6
WC	(Italy) M Trevisan	3	1
(Italy) A Brizzi	6	6
(Italy) A Arnaboldi	1	3
Q	(France) J Eysseric	6	6
WC	(Italy) T Fabbiano	4	4
7	(Ukraine) O Dolgopolov Jr.	6	6

Second round
1	(Italy) P Lorenzi	6	6^{4}	6
(Serbia) B Pašanski	3	7	2
Q	(Tunisia) M Jaziri	4	4
8	(Italy) M Crugnola	6	6
(Italy) F Volandri	6	6
(Italy) A Brizzi	2	0
Q	(France) J Eysseric	1	5
7	(Ukraine) O Dolgopolov Jr.	6	7

Quarterfinals
1	(Italy) P Lorenzi	2	6	6
8	(Italy) M Crugnola	6	4	4
(Italy) F Volandri	1	6^{7}
7	(Ukraine) O Dolgopolov Jr.	6	7

Semifinals
1	(Italy) P Lorenzi	4	2
7	(Ukraine) O Dolgopolov Jr.	6	6

=== Bottom half ===
First round
6	(France) O Patience	6	6
(Croatia) A Veić	3	4
(Italy) S Galvani	6	7
SE	(Portugal) L Tavares	4	6^{4}
WC	(Argentina) C Berlocq	6	6^{5}	6
Q	(Philippines) C Mamiit	1	7	1
(Argentina) C Villagrán	6^{3}	3
3	(France) A Sidorenko	7	6
5	(Italy) T Tenconi	3	7	6
(Spain) G Trujillo Soler	6	6^{4}	2
(Italy) A di Mauro	6	6
(Austria) R Eitzinger	4	4
(Argentina) J-M Aranguren	5	6	6
(Monaco) B Balleret	7	1	4
(Argentina) M Alund	4	3
2	(South Africa) K Anderson	6	6

Second round
6	(France) O Patience	7	6
(Italy) S Galvani	6^{2}	2
WC	(Argentina) C Berlocq	6	1	7
3	(France) A Sidorenko	3	6	5
5	(Italy) T Tenconi	6	6
(Italy) A di Mauro	4	1
(Argentina) J-M Aranguren	6	2	6
2	(South Africa) K Anderson	3	6	4

Quarterfinals
6	(France) O Patience	6	7
WC	(Argentina) C Berlocq	1	5
5	(Italy) T Tenconi	6	5	0
(Argentina) J-M Aranguren	1	7	6

Semifinals
6	(France) O Patience	6^{6}	6	4
(Argentina) J-M Aranguren	7	4	6
