= 2006 BCR Open Romania – Singles =

Singles
- 2006 BCR Open Romania

Final
- Champion: (Austria) Jürgen Melzer
- Runner-up: (Italy) Filippo Volandri
- Score: 6–1, 7–5

Details
- Draw: 32 (4Q / 3WC)
- Seeds: 8

Events
Singles	Doubles
← 2005 ·	BCR Open Romania	· 2007 →

The Men’s Singles tournament of the 2006 BCR Open Romania tennis championship took place in Bucharest, Romania, between 11 September and 17 September 2006. 32 players from 13 countries competed in the 5-round tournament. The final winner was Jürgen Melzer of Austria, who defeated Filippo Volandri of Italy. The defending champion from 2005, Florent Serra, lost in the semifinals to Volandri.

== Seeds ==
1. (Russia) Dmitry Tursunov (second round)
2. (France) Florent Serra (semifinals)
3. (Spain) Carlos Moyá (quarterfinals)
4. (France) Gilles Simon (second round)
5. (Italy) Filippo Volandri (final)
6. (Spain) Rubén Ramírez Hidalgo (quarterfinals)
7. (Germany) Florian Mayer (quarterfinals)
8. (France) Paul-Henri Mathieu (semifinals, retired)

== Draw ==
=== Key ===
- Q = Qualifier
- WC = Wild card
- LL = Lucky loser
- Alt = Alternate
- ITF = ITF entry
- PR = Protected ranking
- SR = Special ranking
- SE = Special exempt
- JE = Junior exempt
- JR = Junior Accelerator Programme entrant
- CO = College Accelerator Programme entrant
- NG = Next Gen Accelerator Program entrant
- w/o = Walkover
- r = Retired
- d = Defaulted

=== Finals ===
Semifinals
8	(France) Paul-Henri Mathieu	4	0^{r}
(Austria) Jürgen Melzer	6	0
5	(Italy) Filippo Volandri	7^{8}	6
2	(France) Florent Serra	6^{6}	4

Final
(Austria) Jürgen Melzer	6	7
5	(Italy) Filippo Volandri	1	5

=== Top half ===
First round
1	(Russia) D Tursunov	1	7^{7}	6
(Germany) A Waske	6	6^{4}	4
(Spain) A Montañés	6	5	1
(Spain) G García López	3	7	6
WC	(Romania) V Crivoi	7	4	6
(Argentina) E Massa	5	6	4
(Germany) S Greul	1	1
8	(France) P-H Mathieu	6	6
4	(France) G Simon	7	3	6
(Argentina) J Mónaco	5	6	3
Q	(Slovakia) M Mertiňák	7	2	5
(Austria) J Melzer	5	6	7
(Belgium) C Rochus	6	7^{7}
Q	(Ukraine) O Dolgopolov Jr.	2	6^{5}
WC	(Romania) V Ioniță	4	4
6	(Spain) R Ramírez Hidalgo	6	6

Second round
1	(Russia) D Tursunov	2	6	6^{3}
(Spain) G García López	6	3	7^{7}
WC	(Romania) V Crivoi	1	1
8	(France) P-H Mathieu	6	6
4	(France) G Simon	6	3	4
(Austria) J Melzer	3	6	6
(Belgium) C Rochus	6	3	1
6	(Spain) R Ramírez Hidalgo	3	6	6

Quarterfinals
(Spain) G García López	1	4
8	(France) P-H Mathieu	6	6
(Austria) J Melzer	6	6
6	(Spain) R Ramírez Hidalgo	4	2

Semifinals
8	(France) P-H Mathieu	4	0^{r}
(Austria) J Melzer	6	0

=== Bottom half ===
First round
5	(Italy) F Volandri	3	6	6
Q	(Italy) S Vagnozzi	6	2	2
(Argentina) M Zabaleta	6	4	3
(Austria) S Koubek	4	6	6
(Romania) A Pavel	6	6
(Serbia) B Pašanski	3	1
(Peru) L Horna	7^{7}	6^{3}	5
3	(Spain) C Moyá	6^{4}	7^{7}	7
7	(Germany) F Mayer	6	6
(Italy) P Starace	2	3
(Italy) A di Mauro	3	2
(Argentina) S Roitman	6	6
(Argentina) M Vassallo Argüello	6	1	6
WC	(Romania) R Sabău	3	6	3
Q	(Argentina) J-M Aranguren	1	0
2	(France) F Serra	6	6

Second round
5	(Italy) F Volandri	3	6	6
(Austria) S Koubek	6	2	2
(Romania) A Pavel	4	6^{5}
3	(Spain) C Moyá	6	7^{7}
7	(Germany) F Mayer	6	6
(Argentina) S Roitman	4	1
(Argentina) M Vassallo Argüello	4	1
2	(France) F Serra	6	6

Quarterfinals
5	(Italy) F Volandri	6	6
3	(Spain) C Moyá	3	3
7	(Germany) F Mayer	3	6^{5}
2	(France) F Serra	6	7^{7}

Semifinals
5	(Italy) F Volandri	7^{8}	6
2	(France) F Serra	6^{6}	4
