= 2008 BCR Open Romania – Doubles =

Doubles
- 2008 BCR Open Romania

Final
- Champions: (France) Nicolas Devilder (France) Paul-Henri Mathieu
- Runners-up: (Poland) Mariusz Fyrstenberg (Poland) Marcin Matkowski
- Score: 7–6^{(7–4)}, 6–7^{(9–11)}, [22–20]

Events
Singles	Doubles
← 2007 ·	BCR Open Romania	· 2009 →

Oliver Marach and Michal Mertiňák were the defending champions, but Marach chose not to participate, and only Mertinak competed that year.
Mertinak partnered with Filip Polášek, but lost in the first round to Nicolas Devilder and Paul-Henri Mathieu.

Nicolas Devilder and Paul-Henri Mathieu won in the final 7–6^{(7–4)}, 6–7^{(9–11)}, [22–20], against Mariusz Fyrstenberg and Marcin Matkowski.

== Seeds ==
1. (Poland) Mariusz Fyrstenberg / (Poland) Marcin Matkowski (final)
2. (Germany) Christopher Kas / (Netherlands) Rogier Wassen (first round)
3. (Slovakia) Michal Mertiňák / (Slovakia) Filip Polášek (first round)
4. (United Kingdom) Ross Hutchins / (United States) Jim Thomas (first round)

== Draw ==
=== Key ===
- Q = Qualifier
- WC = Wild card
- LL = Lucky loser
- Alt = Alternate
- SE = Special exempt
- PR = Protected ranking
- ITF = ITF entry
- JE = Junior exempt
- w/o = Walkover
- r = Retired
- d = Defaulted
- SR = Special ranking

=== Draw ===
First round
1	(Poland) M Fyrstenberg (Poland) M Matkowski	4	6	[10]
(Australia) T Perry (Germany) M Zverev	6	4	[6]
(Sweden) J Brunström (Netherlands Antilles) J-J Rojer	6	6
(United States) J Cerretani (Romania) V Hănescu	4	4
4	(United Kingdom) R Hutchins (United States) J Thomas	2	3
(France) J Chardy (Russia) T Gabashvili	6	6
(Spain) M Granollers (Italy) P Starace	6	4
WC	(Romania) H Tecău (Romania) F Mergea	1	2^{r}
WC	(Romania) M Copil (Romania) P-A Luncanu	4	1
(Germany) D Gremelmayr (Germany) F Moser	6	6
(France) N Devilder (France) P-H Mathieu	7^{7}	6
3	(Slovakia) M Mertiňák (Slovakia) F Polášek	6^{2}	3
(Argentina) J Acasuso (Argentina) S Prieto	6	6
(Spain) Ó Hernández (Spain) Montañés	3	2
(Spain) P Andújar (Spain) I Navarro	6	6
2	(Germany) C Kas (Netherlands) R Wassen	2	4

Quarterfinals
1	(Poland) M Fyrstenberg (Poland) M Matkowski	6	6
(Sweden) J Brunström (Netherlands Antilles) J-J Rojer	1	4
(France) J Chardy (Russia) T Gabashvili	6	1	[10]
(Spain) M Granollers (Italy) P Starace	4	6	[7]
(Germany) D Gremelmayr (Germany) F Moser	2	5
(France) N Devilder (France) P-H Mathieu	6	7
(Argentina) J Acasuso (Argentina) S Prieto	6	6
(Spain) P Andújar (Spain) I Navarro	1	2

Semifinals
1	(Poland) M Fyrstenberg (Poland) M Matkowski	6	6
(France) J Chardy (Russia) T Gabashvili	2	3
(France) N Devilder (France) P-H Mathieu	6	6
(Argentina) J Acasuso (Argentina) S Prieto	4	1

Final
1	(Poland) M Fyrstenberg (Poland) M Matkowski	6^{4}	7^{11}	[20]
(France) N Devilder (France) P-H Mathieu	7^{7}	6^{9}	[22]
