= 2009 Città di Como Challenger – Doubles =

Doubles
- 2009 Città di Como Challenger

Final
- Champions: (Italy) Marco Crugnola (Italy) Alessandro Motti
- Runners-up: (Philippines) Treat Conrad Huey (India) Harsh Mankad
- Score: 7–6(3), 6–3

Events
Singles	Doubles
← 2008 ·	Città di Como Challenger	· 2010 →

For this professional tennis tournament, Mariano Hood and Alberto Martín were the defending champions, but they didn't try to defend their title. Marco Crugnola and Alessandro Motti won this tournament, by defeating Treat Conrad Huey and Harsh Mankad 7–6(3), 6–3 in the final.

== Seeds ==
1. (South Africa) Kevin Anderson / (United Kingdom) Ken Skupski (first round)
2. (United Kingdom) James Auckland / (United Kingdom) Jonathan Marray (semifinals)
3. (Philippines) Treat Conrad Huey / (India) Harsh Mankad (final)
4. (Italy) Marco Crugnola / (Italy) Alessandro Motti (champions)

== Draw ==
=== Key ===
- Q = Qualifier
- WC = Wild card
- LL = Lucky loser
- Alt = Alternate
- SE = Special exempt
- PR = Protected ranking
- ITF = ITF entry
- JE = Junior exempt
- w/o = Walkover
- r = Retired
- d = Defaulted
- SR = Special ranking

=== Draw ===
First round
1	(South Africa) K Anderson (United Kingdom) K Skupski	4	6	[7]
WC	(Chile) A García (Italy) M Jorquera	6	2	[10]
WC	(Philippines) C Mamiit (Italy) D Sanguinetti	7	6
(Italy) S Galvani (Italy) W Trusendi	5	3
3	(Philippines) TC Huey (India) H Mankad	6	7
(Italy) A Arnaboldi (Italy) A Brizzi	3	6^{3}
(Russia) I Belyaev (Russia) E Donskoy	6	7
ALT	(Ukraine) O Dolgopolov Jr. (Moldova) A Gorban	3	6^{2}
(Russia) D Sitak (Croatia) A Veić	4	5
(Switzerland) Y Allegro (Netherlands) J Huta Galung	6	7
(Monaco) B Balleret (Portugal) L Tavares	4	4
4	(Italy) M Crugnola (Italy) A Motti	6	6
(France) J Eysseric (France) A Sidorenko	6^{6}	1
(Italy) T Fabbiano (Serbia) B Pašanski	7	6
(Argentina) J-M Aranguren (Spain) G Trujillo-Soler	5	3
2	(United Kingdom) J Auckland (United Kingdom) J Marray	7	6

Quarterfinals
WC	(Chile) A García (Italy) M Jorquera	7	7
WC	(Philippines) C Mamiit (Italy) D Sanguinetti	6^{7}	5
3	(Philippines) TC Huey (India) H Mankad	7	6
(Russia) I Belyaev (Russia) E Donskoy	6^{2}	2
(Switzerland) Y Allegro (Netherlands) J Huta Galung	6^{3}	6^{5}
4	(Italy) M Crugnola (Italy) A Motti	7	7
(Italy) T Fabbiano (Serbia) B Pašanski	1	6	[8]
2	(United Kingdom) J Auckland (United Kingdom) J Marray	6	4	[10]

Semifinals
WC	(Chile) A García (Italy) M Jorquera	3	6	[5]
3	(Philippines) TC Huey (India) H Mankad	6	3	[10]
4	(Italy) M Crugnola (Italy) A Motti	6	4	[10]
2	(United Kingdom) J Auckland (United Kingdom) J Marray	4	6	[8]

Finals
3	(Philippines) TC Huey (India) H Mankad	6^{3}	2
4	(Italy) M Crugnola (Italy) A Motti	7	6
