= 2007 BCR Open Romania – Doubles =

Doubles
- 2007 BCR Open Romania

Final
- Champions: (Austria) Oliver Marach (Slovakia) Michal Mertiňák
- Runners-up: (Argentina) Martín García (Argentina) Sebastián Prieto
- Score: 7–6^{(7–2)}, 7–6^{(10–8)}

Events
Singles	Doubles
← 2006 ·	BCR Open Romania	· 2008 →

Mariusz Fyrstenberg and Marcin Matkowski were the defending champions, but lost in the semifinals to Oliver Marach and Michal Mertiňák.

Oliver Marach and Michal Mertiňák won in the final 7–6^{(7–2)}, 7–6^{(10–8)}, against Martín García and Sebastián Prieto.

== Seeds ==
1. (Poland) Mariusz Fyrstenberg / (Poland) Marcin Matkowski (semifinals)
2. (Argentina) Martín García / (Argentina) Sebastián Prieto (final)
3. (Germany) Tomas Behrend / (Germany) Christopher Kas (first round)
4. (Austria) Oliver Marach / (Slovakia) Michal Mertiňák (champions)

== Draw ==
=== Key ===
- Q = Qualifier
- WC = Wild card
- LL = Lucky loser
- Alt = Alternate
- ITF = ITF entry
- PR = Protected ranking
- SR = Special ranking
- SE = Special exempt
- JE = Junior exempt
- JR = Junior Accelerator Programme entrant
- CO = College Accelerator Programme entrant
- NG = Next Gen Accelerator Program entrant
- w/o = Walkover
- r = Retired
- d = Defaulted

=== Draw ===
First round
1	(Poland) M Fyrstenberg (Poland) M Matkowski	6	6
ALT	(Romania) A Gavrila (Romania) M-I Miron	1	3
ALT	(Italy) S Bolelli (Italy) A Seppi	6	6
(Spain) Montañés (Spain) R Ramírez Hidalgo	4	3
4	(Austria) O Marach (Slovakia) M Mertiňák	6	6
(Spain) Ó Hernández (Italy) P Starace	3	3
(Uruguay) P Cuevas (Argentina) D Hartfield	3	6^{9}
(Spain) I Navarro Pastor (France) G Simon	6	7^{11}
ALT	(Argentina) J-M Aranguren (Argentina) G Marcaccio	2	4
(Argentina) S Roitman (Italy) F Volandri	6	6
WC	(Romania) V Hănescu (Romania) A Pavel	7^{7}	6^{5}	[10]
3	(Germany) T Behrend (Germany) C Kas	6^{2}	7^{7}	[3]
WC	(Romania) F Mergea (Romania) H Tecău	6	6
(Germany) F Mayer (Switzerland) J-C Scherrer	3	4
ALT	(United States) H Armando (Spain) G García López	3^{r}
2	(Argentina) M García (Argentina) S Prieto	2

Quarterfinals
1	(Poland) M Fyrstenberg (Poland) M Matkowski	2	6	[11]
ALT	(Italy) S Bolelli (Italy) A Seppi	6	3	[9]
4	(Austria) O Marach (Slovakia) M Mertiňák	6	6
(Spain) I Navarro Pastor (France) G Simon	4	4
(Argentina) S Roitman (Italy) F Volandri	1	3
WC	(Romania) V Hănescu (Romania) A Pavel	6	6
WC	(Romania) F Mergea (Romania) H Tecău	7	4	[8]
2	(Argentina) M García (Argentina) S Prieto	5	6	[10]

Semifinals
1	(Poland) M Fyrstenberg (Poland) M Matkowski	4	4
4	(Austria) O Marach (Slovakia) M Mertiňák	6	6
WC	(Romania) V Hănescu (Romania) A Pavel	5	6	[9]
2	(Argentina) M García (Argentina) S Prieto	7	2	[11]

Final
4	(Austria) O Marach (Slovakia) M Mertiňák	7^{7}	7^{10}
2	(Argentina) M García (Argentina) S Prieto	6^{2}	6^{8}
