= 2006 BCR Open Romania – Doubles =

Doubles
- 2006 BCR Open Romania

Final
- Champions: (Poland) Mariusz Fyrstenberg (Poland) Marcin Matkowski
- Runners-up: (Argentina) Martín García (Peru) Luis Horna
- Score: 6–7^{(5–7)}, 7–6^{(7–5)}, [10–8]

Details
- Draw: 16 (2WC)
- Seeds: 4

Events
Singles	Doubles
← 2005 ·	Romanian Open	· 2007 →

The Men’s Doubles tournament of the 2006 BCR Open Romania tennis championship took place in Bucharest, Romania, between 11 and 17 September 2006. 16 pairs from 13 countries competed in the 4-round tournament.

José Acasuso and Sebastián Prieto were the defending champions, but Acasuso opted to rest in order to compete at the Davis Cup the following week. Prieto teamed up with František Čermák and lost in the quarterfinals to Martín García and Luis Horna.

Mariusz Fyrstenberg and Marcin Matkowski won the title by defeating García and Horna 6–7^{(5–7)}, 7–6^{(7–5)}, [10–8] in the final.

== Seeds ==
1. (Poland) Mariusz Fyrstenberg / (Poland) Marcin Matkowski (champions)
2. (Austria) Julian Knowle / (Austria) Jürgen Melzer (semifinals)
3. (Czech Republic) František Čermák / (Argentina) Sebastián Prieto (quarterfinals)
4. (Germany) Michael Kohlmann / (Germany) Alexander Waske (quarterfinals)

== Draw ==
=== Key ===
- Q = Qualifier
- WC = Wild card
- LL = Lucky loser
- Alt = Alternate
- ITF = ITF entry
- PR = Protected ranking
- SR = Special ranking
- SE = Special exempt
- JE = Junior exempt
- JR = Junior Accelerator Programme entrant
- CO = College Accelerator Programme entrant
- NG = Next Gen Accelerator Program entrant
- w/o = Walkover
- r = Retired
- d = Defaulted

=== Draw ===
First round
1	(Poland) M Fyrstenberg (Poland) M Matkowski	6	6
(France) F Serra (France) G Simon	3	1
(Germany) S Greul (Serbia and Montenegro) B Pašanski	1	2
(Slovakia) M Mertiňák (Czech Republic) P Pála	6	6
4	(Germany) M Kohlmann (Germany) A Waske	6	6
(Argentina) J Mónaco (Argentina) M Zabaleta	4	4
(France) PH Mathieu (Belgium) C Rochus	6	7
(Italy) A di Mauro (Italy) F Volandri	0	5
(Argentina) M García (Peru) L Horna	7	6
WC	(Romania) A Pavel (Romania) H Tecău	5	3
(Spain) G García López (Germany) C Kas	6	6^{6}	[3]
3	(Czech Republic) F Čermák (Argentina) S Prieto	4	7^{8}	[10]
WC	(Romania) V Crivoi (Romania) V Ioniță	5	2
(Italy) L Azzaro (Argentina) S Roitman	7	6
(Spain) R Ramírez Hidalgo (Argentina) M Vassallo Argüello	2	3
2	(Austria) J Knowle (Austria) J Melzer	6	6

Quarterfinals
1	(Poland) M Fyrstenberg (Poland) M Matkowski	6	6
(Slovakia) M Mertiňák (Czech Republic) P Pála	2	0
4	(Germany) M Kohlmann (Germany) A Waske	6^{9}	4
(France) PH Mathieu (Belgium) C Rochus	7^{11}	6
(Argentina) M García (Peru) L Horna	3	6	[10]
3	(Czech Republic) F Čermák (Argentina) S Prieto	6	3	[4]
(Italy) L Azzaro (Argentina) S Roitman	5	5
2	(Austria) J Knowle (Austria) J Melzer	7	7

Semifinals
1	(Poland) M Fyrstenberg (Poland) M Matkowski	6	6
(France) PH Mathieu (Belgium) C Rochus	1	2
(Argentina) M García (Peru) L Horna	6	6
2	(Austria) J Knowle (Austria) J Melzer	2	0

Final
1	(Poland) M Fyrstenberg (Poland) M Matkowski	6^{5}	7^{7}	[10]
(Argentina) M García (Peru) L Horna	7^{7}	6^{5}	[8]
