= 2004 BCR Open Romania =

- Date: 13–19 September
- Edition: 12th
- Category: International Series
- Draw: 32S / 16D
- Prize money: $355,000
- Surface: Clay / outdoor
- Location: Bucharest, Romania
- Venue: Arenele BNR

Champions

Singles
- (Argentina) José Acasuso

Doubles
- (Argentina) Lucas Arnold Ker / (Argentina) Mariano Hood
← 2003 ·	BCR Open Romania	· 2005 →

The 2004 BCR Open Romania was a tennis tournament played on outdoor clay courts. It was the 12th edition of the event known that year as the BCR Open Romania, and was part of the International Series of the 2004 ATP Tour. It took place at the Arenele BNR in Bucharest, Romania, from September 13 through September 19, 2004.

== Finals ==
=== Singles ===
(Argentina) José Acasuso defeated (Russia) Igor Andreev 6–3, 6–0

- It was Acasuso's 1st singles title of the year and the 2nd of his career.

=== Doubles ===
(Argentina) Lucas Arnold Ker / (Argentina) Mariano Hood defeated (Argentina) José Acasuso / (Spain) Óscar Hernández 7–6^{(7–5)}, 6–1
