= 2001 Gelsor Open Romania – Doubles =

Doubles
- 2001 Gelsor Open Romania

Final
- Champions: (North Macedonia) Aleksandar Kitinov (Sweden) Johan Landsberg
- Runners-up: (Argentina) Pablo Albano (Germany) Marc-Kevin Goellner
- Score: 6–4, 6–7^{(5–7)}, [10–6]

Details
- Draw: 16
- Seeds: 4

Events
Singles	Doubles
- Gelsor Open Romania

Alberto Martín and Eyal Ran were the defending champions but only Martín competed that year with Paul Rosner.

Martín and Rosner lost in the quarterfinals to Andrei Pavel and Gabriel Trifu.

Aleksandar Kitinov and Johan Landsberg won in the final 6–4, 6–7^{(5–7)}, [10–6] against Pablo Albano and Marc-Kevin Goellner.

== Seeds ==
1. (Spain) Tomás Carbonell / (Argentina) Daniel Orsanic (first round)
2. (Argentina) Mariano Hood / (Argentina) Sebastián Prieto (first round)
3. (Argentina) Pablo Albano / (Germany) Marc-Kevin Goellner (final)
4. (Spain) Juan Balcells / (Spain) Albert Portas (quarterfinals)

== Draw ==
Key

- Q = Qualifier
- WC = Wild card
- LL = Lucky loser
- Alt = Alternate
- ITF = ITF entry
- PR = Protected ranking
- SR = Special ranking
- SE = Special exempt
- JE = Junior exempt
- JR = Junior Accelerator Programme entrant
- CO = College Accelerator Programme entrant
- NG = Next Gen Accelerator Program entrant
- w/o = Walkover
- r = Retired
- d = Defaulted

First round
1	(Spain) T Carbonell (Argentina) D Orsanic	1	2
WC	(Romania) A Pavel (Romania) G Trifu	6	6
WC	(Romania) G Cosac (Romania) D Pescariu
(Spain) A Martín (South Africa) P Rosner	w/o
3	(Argentina) P Albano (Germany) M-K Goellner	6	7
(Georgia (country)) I Labadze (Hungary) A Sávolt	4	5
(Italy) A Schneiter (Czech Republic) D Škoch	7^{7}	7^{7}
WC	(Romania) R Iliescu (Romania) B Ivașcu	6^{4}	6^{5}
(Italy) M Bertolini (Italy) C Brandi	6	5	3
(Australia) B Ellwood (Australia) N Healey	3	7	6
WC	(Romania) I Moldovan (Romania) A Voinea	4	2
4	(Spain) J Balcells (Spain) A Portas	6	6
(Australia) J Kerr (Australia) G Silcock	4	5
(Spain) J I Carrasco (Spain) Á López Morón	6	7
(North Macedonia) A Kitinov (Sweden) J Landsberg	6	3	6
2	(Argentina) M Hood (Argentina) S Prieto	4	6	4

Quarterfinals
WC	(Romania) A Pavel (Romania) G Trifu	6	6
(Spain) A Martín (South Africa) P Rosner	4	1
3	(Argentina) P Albano (Germany) M-K Goellner	6	6
(Italy) A Schneiter (Czech Republic) D Škoch	3	2
(Australia) B Ellwood (Australia) N Healey	7	6
4	(Spain) J Balcells (Spain) A Portas	5	4
(Spain) J I Carrasco (Spain) Á López Morón	2	6	2
(North Macedonia) A Kitinov (Sweden) J Landsberg	6	3	6

Semifinals
WC	(Romania) A Pavel (Romania) G Trifu	4	6	3
3	(Argentina) P Albano (Germany) M-K Goellner	6	3	6
(Australia) B Ellwood (Australia) N Healey	6	6^{2}	4
(North Macedonia) A Kitinov (Sweden) J Landsberg	3	7^{7}	6

Final
3	(Argentina) P Albano (Germany) M-K Goellner	4	7^{7}	[6]
(North Macedonia) A Kitinov (Sweden) J Landsberg	6	6^{5}	[10]
