= 2004 BCR Open Romania – Doubles =

Doubles
- 2004 BCR Open Romania

Final
- Champions: (Argentina) Lucas Arnold Ker (Argentina) Mariano Hood
- Runners-up: (Argentina) José Acasuso (Spain) Óscar Hernández
- Score: 7–6^{(7–5)}, 6–1

Details
- Draw: 16 (2WC/1Alt)
- Seeds: 4

Events
Singles	Doubles
← 2003 ·	Romanian Open	· 2005 →

Karsten Braasch and Sargis Sargsian were the defending champions, but Sargsian did not compete this year. Braasch teamed up with Philipp Kohlschreiber and lost in the semifinals to José Acasuso and Óscar Hernández.

Lucas Arnold Ker and Mariano Hood won the title by defeating Acasuso and Hernández 7–6^{(7–5)}, 6–1 in the final.

== Seeds ==
1. (Austria) Julian Knowle / (Serbia and Montenegro) Nenad Zimonjić (first round)
2. (Argentina) Lucas Arnold Ker / (Argentina) Mariano Hood (champions)
3. (Switzerland) Yves Allegro / (Germany) Michael Kohlmann (quarterfinals)
4. (Sweden) ~~Simon Aspelin~~ / (Australia) ~~Todd Perry~~ (withdrew due to an appendix injury on Perry)

== Draw ==
=== Key ===
- Q = Qualifier
- WC = Wild card
- LL = Lucky loser
- Alt = Alternate
- ITF = ITF entry
- PR = Protected ranking
- SR = Special ranking
- SE = Special exempt
- JE = Junior exempt
- JR = Junior Accelerator Programme entrant
- CO = College Accelerator Programme entrant
- NG = Next Gen Accelerator Program entrant
- w/o = Walkover
- r = Retired
- d = Defaulted

=== Draw ===
First round
1	(Austria) J Knowle (Serbia and Montenegro) N Zimonjić	4	4
(Russia) I Andreev (Russia) N Davydenko	6	6
(Argentina) J Acasuso (Spain) Ó Hernández	7	7^{7}
(Spain) D Ferrer (Spain) Á López Morón	5	6^{2}
3	(Switzerland) Y Allegro (Germany) M Kohlmann	6	3	6
(Spain) A Martín (Spain) D Sánchez	3	6	4
WC	(Romania) F Mergea (Romania) H Tecău	6	4	5
(Germany) K Braasch (Germany) P Kohlschreiber	2	6	7
(Czech Republic) P Pála (Czech Republic) D Škoch	3	7^{7}	6
(Germany) F Mayer (Netherlands) R Wassen	6	6^{4}	0
(Poland) M Fyrstenberg (Poland) M Matkowski	6	6
Alt	(Netherlands) R Sluiter (Netherlands) D van Scheppingen	3	3
WC	(Romania) G Moraru (Romania) G Trifu	0	2
(Italy) D Bracciali (Italy) G Galimberti	6	6
(Italy) M Bertolini (Belgium) T Vanhoudt	3	2
2	(Argentina) L Arnold Ker (Argentina) M Hood	6	6

Quarterfinals
(Russia) I Andreev (Russia) N Davydenko
(Argentina) J Acasuso (Spain) Ó Hernández	w/o
3	(Switzerland) Y Allegro (Germany) M Kohlmann	3	6^{2}
(Germany) K Braasch (Germany) P Kohlschreiber	6	7^{7}
(Czech Republic) P Pála (Czech Republic) D Škoch	5	4
(Poland) M Fyrstenberg (Poland) M Matkowski	7	6
(Italy) D Bracciali (Italy) G Galimberti	4	6	3
2	(Argentina) L Arnold Ker (Argentina) M Hood	6	4	6

Semifinals
(Argentina) J Acasuso (Spain) Ó Hernández	6^{5}	6	6
(Germany) K Braasch (Germany) P Kohlschreiber	7^{7}	2	3
(Poland) M Fyrstenberg (Poland) M Matkowski	1	3
2	(Argentina) L Arnold Ker (Argentina) M Hood	6	6

Final
(Argentina) J Acasuso (Spain) Ó Hernández	6^{5}	1
2	(Argentina) L Arnold Ker (Argentina) M Hood	7^{7}	6
