= Alejandro Fabbri =

Argentine tennis player and coach

- Country (sports): Argentina
- Born: 27 October 1982 (age 43) Rufino, Argentina
- Prize money: $129,022

Singles
- Career record: 0-0
- Career titles: 0
- Highest ranking: No. 328 (4 October 2004)

Doubles
- Career record: 1–1
- Career titles: 0
- Highest ranking: No. 166 (6 July 2009)

Alejandro Fabbri (born 27 October 1982) is an Argentine tennis coach and former professional tennis player.

Fabbri was born in Rufino, a small city in Santa Fe, where he grew up playing in the same age group as Guillermo Coria, also a native of Rufino. Turning professional in 2001, he reached a career high singles ranking of 328 in the world, which he attained in 2004. He made his only ATP Tour main draw in 2007 at the Croatia Open Umag, partnering Carlos Berlocq to the quarter-finals of the doubles. His biggest title win was also in doubles, at the 2008 Asunción Challenger. He won a further 21 doubles titles at ITF Futures level, as well as seven Futures titles in singles.

Since retiring from professional tennis he has worked as a tennis coach and in 2021 he joined the coaching team of Diego Schwartzman, assisting Juan Ignacio Chela. He was the coach of Hugo Dellien when the Bolivian broke through for his first Challenger title in 2018 and before that was the coach of Víctor Estrella Burgos.

== Challenger/Futures titles ==
=== Singles ===
Legend
ITF Futures (7)

No.	Date	Tournament	Tier	Surface	Opponent	Score
1.	Jun 4	Mexico F8, Torreón	Futures	Hard	(Brazil) Rodrigo-Antonio Grilli	6–4, 6–3
2.	Jun 4	USA F14, Sunnyvale	Futures	Hard	(United States) K. J. Hippensteel	6–4, 6–3
3.	Aug 7	Argentina F14, Bahía Blanca	Futures	Clay	(Argentina) Diego Veronelli	3–6, 6–2, 6–0
4.	Sep 7	Argentina F15, Buenos Aires	Futures	Clay	(Argentina) Damián Patriarca	6–7^{(5)}, 6–3 ret
5.	Nov 7	Uruguay F1, Montevideo	Futures	Clay	(Argentina) Cristian Villagrán	3–6, 7–6^{(3)}, 6–3
6.	Dec 8	Argentina F17, Tucumán	Futures	Clay	(Argentina) Diego Álvarez	7–5, 2–6, 6–0
7.	Oct 9	Argentina F19, San Juan	Futures	Clay	(Argentina) Marcos Conocente	6–2, 6–4

=== Doubles ===
Legend
ATP Challenger (1)
ITF Futures (21)

No.	Date	Tournament	Tier	Surface	Partner	Opponents	Score
1.	Oct 2011	Argentina F19, Mendoza	Futures	Clay	(Argentina) Jonathan Gonzalia	(Argentina) Martín Alund (Argentina) Renzo Olivo	6–3, 6–0
2.	Sep 2011	Argentina F16, Santiago del Estero	Futures	Clay	(Argentina) Jonathan Gonzalia	(Argentina) Juan-Pablo Amado (United States) Andrea Collarini	7–4^{(4)}, 6–4
3.	Aug 2011	Argentina F12, Neuquén	Futures	Clay	(Argentina) Juan-Pablo Villar	(Argentina) Tomas Buchhass (Argentina) Mateo Nicolas Martinez	6–4, 1–6, [10–5]
4.	Aug 2011	Argentina F10, Buenos Aires	Futures	Clay	(Argentina) Guillermo Bujniewicz	(Argentina) Guillermo Carry (Argentina) Facundo Mena	4–6, 6–3, [10–8]
5.	Jun 2011	Italy F13, Parma	Futures	Clay	(Argentina) Juan-Martín Aranguren	(Italy) Omar Giacalone (Italy) Gianluca Naso	6–4, 7–6^{(5)}
6.	May 2010	Italy F10, Cesena	Futures	Clay	(Argentina) Juan-Martín Aranguren	(Spain) Pablo Santos (Spain) Gabriel Trujillo Soler	6–2, 7–6^{(2)}
7.	May 2010	Italy F8, Pozzuoli	Futures	Clay	(Argentina) Juan-Martín Aranguren	(United Kingdom) Dan Evans (Lithuania) Laurynas Grigelis	6–4, 7–6^{(4)}
8.	Nov 2009	Argentina F22, Bahía Blanca	Futures	Clay	(Argentina) Jonathan Gonzalia	(Argentina) Mariano Benedicti (Argentina) Marco Trungelliti	6–2, 6–2
9.	Oct 2009	Argentina F19, San Juan	Futures	Clay	(Argentina) Diego Cristin	(Argentina) Alejandro Kon (Argentina) Juan-Manuel Valverde	3–6, 6–4, [10–6]
10.	Oct 2009	Argentina F18, La Rioja	Futures	Clay	(Argentina) Diego Cristin	(Argentina) Guillermo Durán (Argentina) Valentin Florez	7–6^{(4)}, 7–6^{(9)}
11.	Sep 2009	Argentina F16, Salta	Futures	Clay	(Argentina) Leandro Migani	(Argentina) Facundo Argüello (Argentina) Agustin Picco	6–3, 3–6, [10–7]
12.	May 2009	Italy F10, Pozzuoli	Futures	Clay	(Argentina) Juan-Martín Aranguren	(Italy) Leonardo Azzaro (Italy) Walter Trusendi	6–4, 6–4
1.	Oct 2008	Asunción Challenger, Asunción	Challenger	Clay	(Argentina) Leonardo Mayer	(Argentina) Martín García (Argentina) Mariano Hood	7–5, 6–4
13.	Mar 2008	Egypt F1, Cairo	Futures	Clay	(Argentina) Juan-Martín Aranguren	(Egypt) Karim Maamoun (Egypt) Sherif Sabry	7–5, 6–4
14.	Aug 2007	Argentina F14, Bahía Blanca	Futures	Clay	(Argentina) Damián Patriarca	(Argentina) Guillermo Bujniewicz (Argentina) Damian Listingart	6–1, 6–1
15.	May 2007	Italy F14, Pozzuoli	Futures	Clay	(Argentina) Antonio Pastorino	(Russia) Sergei Demekhine (Italy) Luca Vanni	6–1, 7–5
16.	Apr 2007	Italy F12, Piacenza	Futures	Clay	(Argentina) Guillermo Carry	(Croatia) Ivan Cerović (Greece) Alexandros Jakupovic	5–7, 6–4, 6–3
17.	Apr 2007	Italy F11, Padua	Futures	Clay	(Spain) Gabriel Trujillo Soler	(Slovenia) Blaž Kavčič (Slovenia) Grega Žemlja	7–6^{(5)}, 6–2
18.	Sep 2006	Brazil F11, Goiânia	Futures	Clay	(Brazil) Márcio Torres	(Brazil) Carlos Cirne-Lima (Brazil) Renato Silveira	6–4, 6–3
19.	Oct 2005	Chile F4, Santiago	Futures	Clay	(Uruguay) Martín Vilarrubí	(Argentina) Juan-Pablo Amado (Argentina) Agustin Tarantino	6–1, 6–2
20.	Oct 2005	Bolivia F2, Santa Cruz	Futures	Clay	(Uruguay) Martín Vilarrubí	(Argentina) Máximo González (Argentina) Damián Patriarca	7–6^{(4)}, 6–4
21.	Sep 2005	Bolivia F1, Cochabamba	Futures	Clay	(Uruguay) Martín Vilarrubí	(Argentina) Juan-Pablo Amado (Argentina) Agustin Tarantino	2–6, 6–2, 6–1
