= 2008 BCR Open Romania – Singles =

Singles
- 2008 BCR Open Romania

Final
- Champion: (France) Gilles Simon
- Runner-up: (Spain) Carlos Moyá
- Score: 6–3, 6–4

Details
- Draw: 32 (4Q / 3WC)
- Seeds: 8

Events
Singles	Doubles
← 2007 ·	BCR Open Romania	· 2009 →

Gilles Simon was the defending champion, and won in the final 6–3, 6–4, against Carlos Moyá.

== Seeds ==
1. (France) Richard Gasquet (semifinals)
2. (France) Gilles Simon (champion)
3. (Spain) Nicolás Almagro (second round)
4. (France) Paul-Henri Mathieu (first round)
5. (Latvia) Ernests Gulbis (first round)
6. (Spain) Carlos Moyá (final)
7. (Spain) Marcel Granollers (first round)
8. (Argentina) José Acasuso (semifinals)

== Draw ==
=== Key ===
- Q = Qualifier
- WC = Wild card
- LL = Lucky loser
- Alt = Alternate
- SE = Special exempt
- PR = Protected ranking
- ITF = ITF entry
- JE = Junior exempt
- w/o = Walkover
- r = Retired
- d = Defaulted
- SR = Special ranking

=== Finals ===
Semifinals
1/WC	(France) Richard Gasquet	2	4
6	(Spain) Carlos Moyá	6	6
8	(Argentina) José Acasuso	6	6^{4}	4
2	(France) Gilles Simon	4	7^{7}	6

Final
6	(Spain) Carlos Moyá	3	4
2	(France) Gilles Simon	6	6

=== Top half ===
First round
1/WC	(France) R Gasquet	3	6	6
(Spain) Ó Hernández	6	4	4
WC	(Romania) V Crivoi	3	6	6
Q	(Spain) R Ramírez Hildago	6	3	4
LL	(Italy) F Volandri	5	0^{r}
WC	(Romania) A Cruciat	7	4
(Russia) T Gabashvili	6	2	6
5	(Latvia) E Gulbis	2	6	4
3	(Spain) N Almagro	6^{6}	6	7
Q	(India) S Devvarman	7^{8}	2	5
(Spain) G García López	6	3	6
(Germany) M Zverev	4	6	0
Q	(Spain) P Andújar	4	6	6
(Argentina) B Dabul	6	2	4
Q	(Spain) A Martín	4	7^{7}	4
6	(Spain) C Moyá	6	6^{4}	6

Second round
1/WC	(France) R Gasquet	6	6
WC	(Romania) V Crivoi	3	2
WC	(Romania) A Cruciat	1	2
(Russia) T Gabashvili	6	6
3	(Spain) N Almagro	4	5
(Spain) G García López	6	7
Q	(Spain) P Andújar	3	6^{6}
6	(Spain) C Moyá	6	7^{8}

Quarterfinals
1/WC	(France) R Gasquet	6^{6}	6	6
(Russia) T Gabashvili	7^{8}	1	1
(Spain) G García López	7	3	4
6	(Spain) C Moyá	5	6	6

Semifinals
1/WC	(France) R Gasquet	2	4
6	(Spain) C Moyá	6	6

=== Bottom half ===
First round
8	(Argentina) J Acasuso	6	6
(Argentina) D Junqueira	4	4
(Argentina) M Vassallo Argüello	4	7	6
(Romania) V Hănescu	6	5	4
(Germany) D Gremelmayr	6	5	6
(France) J Chardy	1	7	4
(Spain) I Navarro	6	6^{5}	6
4	(France) P-H Mathieu	4	7^{7}	3
7	(Spain) M Granollers	2	4
(Italy) P Starace	6	6
(France) F Serra	3	7^{8}	7^{7}
(France) N Devilder	6	6^{6}	6^{4}
(South Korea) H-t Lee	1	6^{4}
(Spain) A Montañés	6	7^{7}
(Russia) E Korolev	1	2
2	(France) G Simon	6	6

Second round
8	(Argentina) J Acasuso	6	7
(Argentina) M Vassallo Argüello	4	5
(Germany) D Gremelmayr	3	0^{r}
(Spain) I Navarro	6	1
(Italy) P Starace	5	6	4
(France) F Serra	7	0	6
(Spain) A Montañés	3	4
2	(France) G Simon	6	6

Quarterfinals
8	(Argentina) J Acasuso	6	6
(Spain) I Navarro	4	4
(France) F Serra	2	3
2	(France) G Simon	6	6

Semifinals
8	(Argentina) J Acasuso	6	6^{4}	4
2	(France) G Simon	4	7^{7}	6
