= 2001 Gelsor Open Romania – Singles =

Singles
- 2001 Gelsor Open Romania

Final
- Champion: (Morocco) Younes El Aynaoui
- Runner-up: (Spain) Albert Montañés
- Score: 7–6^{(7–5)}, 7–6^{(7–2)}

Details
- Draw: 32
- Seeds: 8

Events
Singles	Doubles
- Gelsor Open Romania

Juan Balcells was the defending champion but lost in the quarterfinals to Albert Montañés.

Younes El Aynaoui won in the final 7–6^{(7–5)}, 7–6^{(7–2)} against Montañés.

== Seeds ==
A champion seed is indicated in bold text while text in italics indicates the round in which that seed was eliminated.

1. (Romania) Andrei Pavel (second round)
2. (Spain) Albert Portas (second round)
3. (Spain) Alberto Martín (first round)
4. (Sweden) Andreas Vinciguerra (first round)
5. (Spain) Galo Blanco (first round)
6. (France) Jérôme Golmard (semifinals)
7. (Morocco) **Younes El Aynaoui (champion)**
8. (Spain) Juan Balcells (quarterfinals)

== Draw ==
Key

- Q = Qualifier
- WC = Wild card
- LL = Lucky loser
- Alt = Alternate
- ITF = ITF entry
- PR = Protected ranking
- SR = Special ranking
- SE = Special exempt
- JE = Junior exempt
- JR = Junior Accelerator Programme entrant
- CO = College Accelerator Programme entrant
- NG = Next Gen Accelerator Program entrant
- w/o = Walkover
- r = Retired
- d = Defaulted

First round
1	(Romania) **A Pavel**	**6**	**6**
(Czech Republic) J Vaněk	0	3
(Argentina) J Acasuso	6^{7}	4
(Germany) **T Behrend**	**7^{9}**	**6**
(Austria) M Hipfl	0	1
(Spain) **F Mantilla**	**6**	**6**
WC	(Romania) D Pescariu	0	2
7	(Morocco) **Y El Aynaoui**	**6**	**6**
3	(Spain) A Martín	**6**	1	4
(Romania) **A Voinea**	3	**6**	**6**
Q	(Spain) **R Ramírez Hidalgo**	**7**	**6**
(Hungary) A Sávolt	5	3
(Spain) **F Vicente**	**6**	**6**
(United States) H Armando	2	0
LL	(Spain) **M López**	**6**	**6**
5	(Spain) G Blanco	2	2
6	(France) **J Golmard**	**6**	**6**
(Australia) A Ilie	2	2
(Georgia (country)) I Labadze	3	4
(Spain) **J Díaz**	**6**	**6**
WC	(Romania) **G Trifu**	4	**6**	**7^{7}**
WC	(Romania) I Moldovan	**6**	1	6^{5}
(Belgium) **C Rochus**	**6**	**6**
4	(Sweden) A Vinciguerra	1	2
8	(Spain) **J Balcells**	**7**	**7^{7}**
Q	(Germany) M-K Goellner	5	6^{4}
(Spain) D Sánchez	**6**	5	4
Q	(Argentina) **J I Chela**	2	**7**	**6**
(Spain) **A Montañés**	**6**	**6**
(Belgium) O Rochus	1	1
Q	(Greece) S Peppas	0	2
2	(Spain) **A Portas**	**6**	**6**

Second round
1	(Romania) A Pavel	0	2
(Germany) **T Behrend**	**6**	**6**
(Spain) F Mantilla	3	2
7	(Morocco) **Y El Aynaoui**	**6**	**6**
(Romania) **A Voinea**	**6**	**6**
Q	(Spain) R Ramírez Hidalgo	3	2
(Spain) **F Vicente**	**6**	**6**
LL	(Spain) M López	3	3
6	(France) **J Golmard**	**6**	2	**7^{7}**
(Spain) J Díaz	4	**6**	6^{4}
WC	(Romania) G Trifu	6^{4}	4
(Belgium) **C Rochus**	**7^{7}**	**6**
8	(Spain) **J Balcells**	**6**	**6**
Q	(Argentina) J I Chela	3	4
(Spain) **A Montañés**	**6**	4	**7^{9}**
2	(Spain) A Portas	4	**6**	6^{7}

Quarterfinals
(Germany) T Behrend	4	**7**	4
7	(Morocco) **Y El Aynaoui**	**6**	5	**6**
(Romania) A Voinea	4	**6**	5
(Spain) **F Vicente**	**6**	4	**7**
6	(France) **J Golmard**	**6**	3	**6**
(Belgium) C Rochus	1	**6**	3
8	(Spain) J Balcells	5	**6**	1
(Spain) **A Montañés**	**7**	3	**6**

Semifinals
7	(Morocco) **Y El Aynaoui**	**7^{7}**	**6**
(Spain) F Vicente	6^{4}	4
6	(France) J Golmard	**7^{7}**	3	5
(Spain) **A Montañés**	6^{5}	**6**	**7**

Final
7	(Morocco) **Younes El Aynaoui**	**7^{7}**	**7^{7}**
(Spain) Albert Montañés	6^{5}	6^{2}
