= 2004 BCR Open Romania – Singles =

Singles
- 2004 BCR Open Romania

Final
- Champion: (Argentina) José Acasuso
- Runner-up: (Russia) Igor Andreev
- Score: 6–3, 6–0

Details
- Draw: 32 (3WC/4Q)
- Seeds: 8

Events
Singles	Doubles
- Romanian Open

David Sánchez was the defending champion, but lost in the second round to José Acasuso.

Acasuso won the title by defeating Igor Andreev 6–3, 6–0 in the final.

== Seeds ==
1. (Spain) Fernando Verdasco (first round)
2. (Germany) Florian Mayer (semifinals)
3. (Spain) Albert Costa (first round)
4. (Russia) Igor Andreev (final)
5. (Russia) Nikolay Davydenko (first round)
6. (Spain) David Ferrer (quarterfinals)
7. (Italy) Filippo Volandri (semifinals)
8. (Spain) David Sánchez (second round)

== Draw ==
Key

- Q = Qualifier
- WC = Wild card
- LL = Lucky loser
- Alt = Alternate
- ITF = ITF entry
- PR = Protected ranking
- SR = Special ranking
- SE = Special exempt
- JE = Junior exempt
- JR = Junior Accelerator Programme entrant
- CO = College Accelerator Programme entrant
- NG = Next Gen Accelerator Program entrant
- w/o = Walkover
- r = Retired
- d = Defaulted

=== Finals ===
Semifinals
7	(Italy) Filippo Volandri	6^{5}	2
(Argentina) José Acasuso	7^{7}	6
4	(Russia) Igor Andreev	2	6	6
2	(Germany) Florian Mayer	6	1	4

Final
(Argentina) José Acasuso	6	6
4	(Russia) Igor Andreev	3	0

=== Top half ===
First round
1	(Spain) F Verdasco	6^{4}	6^{3}
(Romania) V Hănescu	7^{7}	7^{7}
(Austria) S Koubek	6	7^{7}
WC	(Romania) V Ioniță	3	6^{3}
Q	(France) R Gasquet	6	6
(Italy) P Starace	3	4
(Spain) A Montañés	3	1
7	(Italy) F Volandri	6	6
3/WC	(Spain) A Costa	1	2
(France) PH Mathieu	6	6
(Spain) À Corretja	7	2	7
(Spain) Ó Hernández	5	6	5
Q	(Argentina) F Squillari	6	4	2
(Argentina) J Acasuso	3	6	6
(Netherlands) R Sluiter	2	6^{3}
8	(Spain) D Sánchez	6	7^{7}

Second round
(Romania) V Hănescu	6	6
(Austria) S Koubek	2	3
Q	(France) R Gasquet	2	6	3
7	(Italy) F Volandri	6	1	6
(France) PH Mathieu	3	6	6
(Spain) À Corretja	6	3	1
(Argentina) J Acasuso	6	6
8	(Spain) D Sánchez	3	0

Quarterfinals
(Romania) V Hănescu	3	1
7	(Italy) F Volandri	6	6
(France) PH Mathieu	2	6^{2}
(Argentina) J Acasuso	6	7^{7}

Semifinals
7	(Italy) F Volandri	6^{5}	2
(Argentina) J Acasuso	7^{7}	6

=== Bottom half ===
First round
5	(Russia) N Davydenko	6^{3}	0
(Spain) F Mantilla	7^{7}	6
(Spain) Á Calatrava	7^{9}	6
(Argentina) J Mónaco	6^{7}	2
WC	(Romania) R Sabău	1	1
(Germany) P Kohlschreiber	6	6
(Belgium) K Vliegen	2	3
4	(Russia) I Andreev	6	6
6	(Spain) D Ferrer	6	7^{7}
Q	(Switzerland) S Wawrinka	4	6^{4}
(France) A Clément	6	4	4
Q	(Serbia and Montenegro) N Djokovic	2	6	6
(France) A Di Pasquale	4
(Germany) D Elsner	0^{r}
(Netherlands) D van Scheppingen	1	1
2	(Germany) F Mayer	6	6

Second round
(Spain) F Mantilla	6	6
(Spain) Á Calatrava	3	1
(Germany) P Kohlschreiber	6^{6}	2
4	(Russia) I Andreev	7^{8}	6
6	(Spain) D Ferrer	4	6	6
Q	(Serbia and Montenegro) N Djokovic	6	4	4
(France) A Di Pasquale	6^{6}	6	3
2	(Germany) F Mayer	7^{8}	4	6

Quarterfinals
(Spain) F Mantilla	4	2
4	(Russia) I Andreev	6	6
6	(Spain) D Ferrer	4	2
2	(Germany) F Mayer	6	6

Semifinals
4	(Russia) I Andreev	2	6	6
2	(Germany) F Mayer	6	1	4
