= 2007 BCR Open Romania – Singles =

Singles
- 2007 BCR Open Romania

Final
- Champion: (France) Gilles Simon
- Runner-up: (Romania) Victor Hănescu
- Score: 4–6, 6–3, 6–2

Details
- Draw: 32 (4Q / 3WC)
- Seeds: 8

Events
| Singles | Doubles |
| ← 2006 · | BCR Open Romania | · 2008 → |

Jürgen Melzer was the defending champion, but lost in the first round to Andreas Seppi.

Sixth-seeded Gilles Simon won in the final 4–6, 6–3, 6–2, against Victor Hănescu.

== Seeds ==
1. (Spain) Nicolás Almagro (first round, retired)
2. (Italy) Filippo Volandri (first round)
3. (Italy) Potito Starace (quarterfinals)
4. (Austria) Jürgen Melzer (first round)
5. (Russia) Igor Andreev (second round)
6. (France) Gilles Simon (champion)
7. (France) Fabrice Santoro (first round)
8. (Spain) Albert Montañés (second round)

== Draw ==
=== Key ===
- Q = Qualifier
- WC = Wild card
- LL = Lucky loser
- Alt = Alternate
- SE = Special exempt
- PR = Protected ranking
- ITF = ITF entry
- JE = Junior exempt
- w/o = Walkover
- r = Retired
- d = Defaulted
- SR = Special ranking

=== Finals ===
Semifinals
(Argentina) Carlos Berlocq | 7^{7} | 2 | 3
6 | (France) Gilles Simon | 6^{4} | 6 | 6
WC | (Romania) Victor Hănescu | 6 | 6
Q | (France) Gaël Monfils | 2 | 3

Final
6 | (France) Gilles Simon | 4 | 6 | 6
WC | (Romania) Victor Hănescu | 6 | 3 | 2

=== Top half ===
First round
1 | (Spain) N Almagro | 6 | 1^{r}
(Italy) S Bolelli | 4 | 5
Q | (Russia) Y Schukin | 7^{7} | 5 | 6
(Argentina) D Hartfield | 6^{5} | 7 | 2
(Australia) C Guccione | 4 | 6^{4}
(Spain) I Navarro Pastor | 6 | 7^{7}
(Argentina) C Berlocq | 7^{7} | 6
7/WC | (France) F Santoro | 6^{5} | 1
4 | (Austria) J Melzer | 6 | 5 | 4
(Italy) A Seppi | 4 | 7 | 6
(Argentina) S Roitman | 0 | 1
Q | (United States) H Armando | 6 | 6
(Russia) E Korolev | 4 | 6
(France) F Serra | 6 | 5^{r}
(Spain) G García López | 6^{3} | 4
6 | (France) G Simon | 7^{7} | 6

Second round
(Italy) S Bolelli | 4 | 3
Q | (Russia) Y Schukin | 6 | 6
(Spain) I Navarro Pastor | 5 | 3
(Argentina) C Berlocq | 7 | 6
(Italy) A Seppi | 0 | 3
Q | (United States) H Armando | 6 | 6
(Russia) E Korolev | 4 | 2
6 | (France) G Simon | 6 | 6

Quarterfinals
Q | (Russia) Y Schukin | 5 | 3
(Argentina) C Berlocq | 7 | 6
Q | (United States) H Armando | 4 | 2
6 | (France) G Simon | 6 | 6

Semifinals
(Argentina) C Berlocq | 7^{7} | 2 | 3
6 | (France) G Simon | 6^{4} | 6 | 6

=== Bottom half ===
First round
8 | (Spain) Montañés | 6 | 6
(France) N Devilder | 3 | 1
(Germany) F Mayer | 6^{1} | 6^{3}
WC | (Romania) V Hănescu | 7^{7} | 7^{7}
WC | (Romania) A Pavel | 7 | 7
(Spain) Ó Hernández | 5 | 5
(Belgium) K Vliegen | 6 | 5 | 2
3 | (Italy) P Starace | 3 | 7 | 6
5 | (Russia) I Andreev | 6 | 3 | 6
(Australia) P Luczak | 4 | 6 | 4
Q | (Romania) C Gârd | 4 | 4
(France) M Gicquel | 6 | 6
(Argentina) M Vassallo Argüello | 6 | 6
(Austria) W Eschauer | 4 | 4
Q | (France) G Monfils | 6 | 7^{7}
2 | (Italy) F Volandri | 3 | 6^{4}

Second round
8 | (Spain) Montañés | 3 | 2
WC | (Romania) V Hănescu | 6 | 6
WC | (Romania) A Pavel | 3 | 3
3 | (Italy) P Starace | 6 | 6
5 | (Russia) I Andreev | 4 | 3
(France) M Gicquel | 6 | 6
(Argentina) M Vassallo Argüello | 4 | 4
Q | (France) G Monfils | 6 | 6

Quarterfinals
WC | (Romania) V Hănescu | 7^{7} | 7
3 | (Italy) P Starace | 6^{5} | 5
(France) M Gicquel | 4 | 2
Q | (France) G Monfils | 6 | 6

Semifinals
WC | (Romania) V Hănescu | 6 | 6
Q | (France) G Monfils | 2 | 3
