= Martín García (tennis) =

Argentine tennis player

Martin Garcia
- Country (sports): Argentina
- Residence: Buenos Aires, Argentina
- Born: 2 May 1977 (age 48); Buenos Aires, Argentina
- Height: 1.91 m (6 ft 3 in)
- Turned pro: 1996
- Retired: 2008
- Plays: Right-handed
- Prize money: $868,540

Singles
- Career record: 0–3
- Career titles: 0; 0 Challenger, 0 Futures
- Highest ranking: No. 342 (2 February 1998)

Doubles
- Career record: 188–188
- Career titles: 8; 10 Challenger, 3 Futures
- Highest ranking: No. 21 (21 May 2001)

Grand Slam doubles results
- Australian Open: 3R (2001)
- French Open: SF (2000)
- Wimbledon: 3R (2006)
- US Open: 2R (2001, 2003)

Mixed doubles
- Career record: 5–16
- Career titles: 0

Grand Slam mixed doubles results
- Australian Open: 1R (2001, 2002, 2008)
- French Open: 1R (2000, 2001, 2007)
- Wimbledon: 3R (2005)
- US Open: 2R (2006)
- Last updated on: 22 April 2023.

Martín Alberto García (Latin American Spanish: [maɾˈtin alˈβeɾto ɣaɾˈsi.a]; (Note: In isolation, García is pronounced [ɡaɾˈsi.a].) born 2 May 1977) is a professional tennis player from Argentina.

García turned pro in 1996, and has won 8 doubles titles on the ATP Tour during his career. He reached his career high doubles ranking of World No. 21 on 21 May 2001.

== Performance timeline ==
Key
W	F	SF	QF	#R	RR	Q#	DNQ	A	NH

(W) winner; (F) finalist; (SF) semifinalist; (QF) quarterfinalist; (#R) rounds 4, 3, 2, 1; (RR) round-robin stage; (Q#) qualification round; (DNQ) did not qualify; (A) absent; (NH) not held; (SR) strike rate (events won / competed); (W–L) win–loss record.

=== Doubles ===
Tournament	1999	2000	2001	2002	2003	2004	2005	2006	2007	2008	SR	W–L	Win %
Grand Slam tournaments
Australian Open	A	1R	3R	1R	1R	2R	2R	1R	1R	1R	0 / 9	4–9	31%
French Open	A	SF	1R	1R	1R	1R	3R	1R	2R	A	0 / 8	7–8	47%
Wimbledon	A	1R	1R	2R	2R	2R	1R	3R	2R	1R	0 / 9	6–9	40%
US Open	1R	1R	2R	1R	2R	1R	1R	1R	1R	A	0 / 9	2–9	18%
Win–loss	0–1	4–4	3–4	1–4	2–4	2–4	3–4	2–4	2–4	0–2	0 / 35	19–35	35%
ATP Tour Masters 1000
Indian Wells Masters	A	A	1R	A	A	2R	1R	A	A	A	0 / 3	1–3	25%
Miami Open	A	1R	3R	A	A	2R	1R	2R	1R	A	0 / 6	3–6	33%
Monte-Carlo Masters	A	2R	QF	A	A	1R	A	1R	A	A	0 / 4	3–4	43%
Hamburg	A	A	2R	A	A	A	A	A	1R	A	0 / 2	1–2	33%
Rome Masters	A	1R	1R	A	A	A	A	1R	A	A	0 / 3	0–3	0%
Canada Masters	A	2R	1R	A	A	A	A	A	1R	A	0 / 3	1–3	25%
Cincinnati Masters	A	2R	QF	A	A	A	A	A	1R	A	0 / 3	3–3	50%
Paris Masters	A	SF	QF	A	A	A	A	A	A	A	0 / 2	5–2	71%
Stuttgart	A	1R	A	Not Masters Series							0 / 1	0–1	0%
Win–loss	0–0	6–7	8–8	0–0	0–0	2–3	0–2	1–3	0–4	0–0	0 / 27	17–27	39%

=== Mixed doubles ===
Tournament	2000	2001	2002	2003	2004	2005	2006	2007	2008	SR	W–L	Win %
Grand Slam tournaments
Australian Open	A	1R	1R	A	A	A	A	A	1R	0 / 3	0–3	0%
French Open	1R	1R	A	A	A	A	A	1R	A	0 / 3	0–3	0%
Wimbledon	1R	2R	A	A	1R	3R	1R	2R	A	0 / 6	4–6	40%
US Open	1R	1R	1R	A	A	A	2R	A	A	0 / 4	1–4	20%
Win–loss	0–3	1–4	0–2	0–0	0–1	2–1	1–2	1–2	0–1	0 / 16	5–16	24%

== ATP Career Finals ==
=== Doubles: 22 (8 titles, 14 runner-ups) ===
Legend Grand Slam Tournaments (0–0) ATP World Tour Finals (0–0) ATP Masters Series (0–0) ATP Championship Series (0–2) ATP International Series (8–12)	Finals by surface Hard (2–2) Clay (6–12) Grass (0–0) Carpet (0–0)	Finals by setting Outdoors (8–14) Indoors (0–0)

Result	W–L	Date	Tournament	Tier	Surface	Partner	Opponents	Score
Win	1–0	Aug 1999	Boston, United States	World Series	Hard	(Argentina) Guillermo Cañas	(South Africa) Marius Barnard (United States) T. J. Middleton	5–7, 7–6^{(7–2)}, 6–3
Win	2–0	Oct 1999	Bucharest, Romania	World Series	Clay	(Argentina) Lucas Arnold Ker	(Germany) Marc-Kevin Goellner (United States) Francisco Montana	6–3, 2–6, 6–3
Win	3–0	Oct 2000	Palermo, Italy	International Series	Clay	(Spain) Tomás Carbonell	(Argentina) Pablo Albano (Germany) Marc-Kevin Goellner	walkover
Loss	3–1	Jan 2001	Auckland, New Zealand	International Series	Hard	(South Africa) David Adams	(South Africa) Marius Barnard (United States) Jim Thomas	6–7^{(8–10)}, 4–6
Loss	3–2	Mar 2001	Acapulco, Mexico	Championship Series	Clay	(South Africa) David Adams	(United States) Donald Johnson (Brazil) Gustavo Kuerten	3–6, 6–7^{(5–7)}
Loss	3–3	Jan 2002	Auckland, New Zealand	International Series	Hard	(Czech Republic) Cyril Suk	(Sweden) Jonas Björkman (Australia) Todd Woodbridge	6–7^{(5–7)}, 6–7^{(7–9)}
Loss	3–4	Apr 2002	Casablanca, Morocco	International Series	Clay	(Argentina) Luis Lobo	(Australia) Stephen Huss (South Africa) Myles Wakefield	4–6, 2–6
Loss	3–5	Jul 2004	Kitzbühel, Austria	Championship Series	Clay	(Argentina) Lucas Arnold Ker	(Czech Republic) František Čermák (Czech Republic) Leoš Friedl	3–6, 5–7
Loss	3–6	Aug 2004	Sopot, Poland	International Series	Clay	(Argentina) Sebastián Prieto	(Czech Republic) František Čermák (Czech Republic) Leoš Friedl	6–2, 2–6, 3–6
Loss	3–7	Apr 2005	Casablanca, Morocco	International Series	Clay	(Peru) Luis Horna	(Czech Republic) František Čermák (Czech Republic) Leoš Friedl	4–6, 3–6
Loss	3–8	Apr 2005	Houston, United States	International Series	Clay	(Peru) Luis Horna	(The Bahamas) Mark Knowles (Canada) Daniel Nestor	3–6, 4–6
Win	4–8	Jul 2005	Amersfoort, Netherlands	International Series	Clay	(Peru) Luis Horna	(Chile) Fernando González (Chile) Nicolás Massú	6–4, 6–4
Win	5–8	Oct 2005	Palermo, Italy	International Series	Clay	(Argentina) Mariano Hood	(Poland) Mariusz Fyrstenberg (Poland) Marcin Matkowski	6–2, 6–3
Loss	5–9	Aug 2006	Sopot, Poland	International Series	Clay	(Argentina) Sebastián Prieto	(Czech Republic) František Čermák (Czech Republic) Leoš Friedl	3–6, 5–7
Loss	5–10	Sep 2006	Bucharest, Romania	International Series	Clay	(Peru) Luis Horna	(Poland) Mariusz Fyrstenberg (Poland) Marcin Matkowski	7–6^{(7–5)}, 6–7^{(5–7)}, [8–10]
Win	6–10	Oct 2006	Palermo, Italy	International Series	Clay	(Peru) Luis Horna	(Poland) Mariusz Fyrstenberg (Poland) Marcin Matkowski	7–6^{(7–1)}, 7–6^{(7–2)}
Win	7–10	Feb 2007	Buenos Aires, Argentina	International Series	Clay	(Argentina) Sebastián Prieto	(Spain) Álbert Montañés (Spain) Rubén Ramírez Hidalgo	6–4, 6–2
Loss	7–11	May 2007	Estoril, Portugal	International Series	Clay	(Argentina) Sebastián Prieto	(Brazil) Marcelo Melo (Brazil) André Sá	6–3, 2–6, [6–10]
Loss	7–12	Jul 2007	Båstad, Sweden	International Series	Clay	(Argentina) Sebastián Prieto	(Sweden) Simon Aspelin (Austria) Julian Knowle	2–6, 4–6
Loss	7–13	Aug 2007	Sopot, Poland	International Series	Clay	(Argentina) Sebastián Prieto	(Poland) Mariusz Fyrstenberg (Poland) Marcin Matkowski	1–6, 1–6
Loss	7–14	Sep 2007	Bucharest, Romania	International Series	Clay	(Argentina) Sebastián Prieto	(Austria) Oliver Marach (Slovakia) Michal Mertiňák	6–7^{(2–7)}, 6–7^{(10–12)}
Win	8–14	Jan 2008	Adelaide, Australia	International Series	Hard	(Brazil) Marcelo Melo	(Australia) Chris Guccione (Australia) Robert Smeets	6–3, 3–6, [10–7]

== ATP Challenger and ITF Futures finals ==
=== Doubles: 25 (13–12) ===
Legend ATP Challenger (10–12) ITF Futures (3–0)	Finals by surface Hard (3–5) Clay (10–6) Grass (0–0) Carpet (0–1)

Result	W–L	Date	Tournament	Tier	Surface	Partner	Opponents	Score
Loss	0–1	Jul 1997	Quito, Ecuador	Challenger	Clay	(Paraguay) Ramón Delgado	(Mexico) Bernardo Martínez (Mexico) Marco Osorio	4–6, 4–6
Win	1–1	May 1998	Germany F4, Esslingen	Futures	Clay	(Argentina) Federico Browne	(France) Julien Boutter (Monaco) Jean-Rene Lisnard	7–6, 6–2
Win	2–1	Jul 1998	Brazil F1, Londrina	Futures	Clay	(Argentina) Damián Furmanski	(Brazil) Alexandre Simoni (Brazil) Paulo Taicher	7–5, 5–4 ret.
Win	3–1	Nov 1998	Paraguay F1, Asunción	Futures	Clay	(Argentina) Damián Furmanski	(Argentina) Roberto Marcelo Alvarez (Argentina) Jose-Maria Arnedo	3–6, 6–1, 6–4
Win	4–1	Nov 1998	Buenos Aires, Argentina	Challenger	Clay	(Argentina) Guillermo Cañas	(Spain) Alberto Martín (Spain) Salvador Navarro	2–6, 6–3, 7–5
Loss	4–2	Dec 1998	Guadalajara, Mexico	Challenger	Clay	(Argentina) Sebastián Prieto	(Netherlands) Sander Groen (Lebanon) Ali Hamadeh	4–6, 2–6
Loss	4–3	Feb 1999	Hamburg, Germany	Challenger	Carpet	(Brazil) Cristiano Testa	(Germany) Michael Kohlmann (Switzerland) Filippo Veglio	4–6, 6–7
Loss	4–4	Mar 1999	Grenoble, France	Challenger	Hard	(Brazil) Cristiano Testa	(United States) Adam Peterson (United States) Chris Tontz	6–4, 3–6, 4–6
Loss	4–5	Mar 1999	Besançon, France	Challenger	Hard	(Brazil) Cristiano Testa	(Spain) Juan Ignacio Carrasco (Spain) Jairo Velasco	1–6, 6–7
Win	5–5	Apr 1999	Nice, France	Challenger	Clay	(Argentina) Sebastián Prieto	(Czech Republic) Tomáš Cibulec (Czech Republic) Leoš Friedl	7–6, 6–4
Loss	5–6	Sep 1999	Szczecin, Poland	Challenger	Clay	(Argentina) Guillermo Cañas	(North Macedonia) Aleksandar Kitinov (United States) Jack Waite	1–6, 7–5, 4–6
Win	6–6	Oct 1999	Lima, Peru	Challenger	Clay	(Argentina) Pablo Albano	(Argentina) Sebastián Prieto (Argentina) Mariano Hood	7–6, 3–6, 6–3
Win	7–6	Nov 1999	Montevideo, Uruguay	Challenger	Clay	(Argentina) Pablo Albano	(Argentina) Diego del Río (Argentina) Daniel Orsanic	6–2, 6–3
Win	8–6	Nov 1999	Buenos Aires, Argentina	Challenger	Clay	(Argentina) Guillermo Cañas	(South Africa) Paul Rosner (Serbia) Dušan Vemić	6–4, 6–4
Win	9–6	Sep 2000	Biella, Italy	Challenger	Clay	(Argentina) Mariano Puerta	(Sweden) Simon Aspelin (Sweden) Fredrik Bergh	6–2, 4–6, 6–4
Loss	9–7	Feb 2003	Dallas, United States	Challenger	Hard	(United States) Graydon Oliver	(United States) Justin Gimelstob (United States) Scott Humphries	6–7^{(7–9)}, 6–7^{(4–7)}
Win	10–7	Feb 2003	Joplin, United States	Challenger	Hard	(United States) Graydon Oliver	(United States) Diego Ayala (United States) Brandon Coupe	6–1, 6–4
Win	11–7	Mar 2003	Salinas, Ecuador	Challenger	Hard	(Argentina) Sebastián Prieto	(Germany) Michael Kohlmann (Israel) Harel Levy	walkover
Loss	11–8	May 2003	Prague, Czech Republic	Challenger	Clay	(Argentina) Sebastián Prieto	(Czech Republic) Tomáš Berdych (Czech Republic) Michal Navrátil	4–6, 6–3, 4–6
Loss	11–9	Aug 2003	Bronx, United States	Challenger	Hard	(United States) Graydon Oliver	(France) Julien Benneteau (France) Nicolas Mahut	1–6, 1–6
Loss	11–10	Nov 2003	Bratislava, Slovakia	Challenger	Hard	(Croatia) Mario Ančić	(Israel) Harel Levy (Israel) Jonathan Erlich	6–7^{(7–9)}, 3–6
Loss	11–11	Oct 2006	Montevideo, Uruguay	Challenger	Clay	(Argentina) Guillermo Cañas	(Argentina) Sergio Roitman (Argentina) Máximo González	3–6, 6–7^{(5–7)}
Win	12–11	Mar 2007	Bogotá, Colombia	Challenger	Clay	(Argentina) Diego Hartfield	(Portugal) Fred Gil (Belgium) Dick Norman	6–4, 3–6, [10–5]
Win	13–11	Oct 2007	Andrézieux, France	Challenger	Hard	(Argentina) Sebastián Prieto	(Argentina) José Acasuso (Argentina) Diego Hartfield	6–3, 6–1
Loss	13–12	Oct 2008	Asunción, Paraguay	Challenger	Clay	(Argentina) Mariano Hood	(Argentina) Alejandro Fabbri (Argentina) Leonardo Mayer	5–7, 4–6
