= Aleksandar Kitinov =

Macedonian tennis player

- Country (sports): Yugoslavia (1991–1992); North Macedonia (1992–2003)
- Born: 13 January 1971 (age 54) Skopje, SR Macedonia, SFR Yugoslavia
- Height: 1.90 m (6 ft 3 in)
- Turned pro: 1992
- Plays: Right-handed
- Prize money: $618,346

Singles
- Career record: 0–2
- Career titles: 0
- Highest ranking: No. 296 (29 April 1996)

Doubles
- Career record: 90–168
- Career titles: 3
- Highest ranking: No. 38 (15 November 1999)

Grand Slam doubles results
- Australian Open: 2R (1997, 1998, 1999)
- French Open: 2R (1998, 2001)
- Wimbledon: 3R (2001)
- US Open: 2R (2001)

Grand Slam mixed doubles results
- Australian Open: QF (1998)
- French Open: 1R (1998, 1999, 2000)
- Wimbledon: 1R (1997, 1998, 1999, 2000, 2002)
- US Open: 2R (1997)

Aleksandar Kitinov (Macedonian: Александар Китинов; born 13 January 1971) is a retired Macedonian professional tennis player. Kitinov turned pro in 1992 and retired in 2003. A doubles specialist, he won three titles during his career on the ATP Tour and reached a career-high ranking of No. 38 in November 1999.

== ATP Tour finals ==
=== Doubles (3 titles – 4 runners-up) ===
Result	No.	Date	Tournament	Surface	Partner	Opponents	Score
Loss	1.	Jul 1997	Newport, United States	Grass	(United States) Kent Kinnear	(United States) Justin Gimelstob (New Zealand) Brett Steven	3–6, 4–6
Win	1.	Sep 1997	Bournemouth, England	Clay	(United States) Kent Kinnear	(Spain) Alberto Martín (United Kingdom) Chris Wilkinson	7–6, 6–2
Loss	2.	Feb 1999	San Jose, United States	Hard (i)	(Serbia and Montenegro) Nenad Zimonjić	(Australia) Todd Woodbridge (Australia) Mark Woodforde	5–7, 7–6^{(7–3)}, 4–6
Loss	3.	Jul 1999	Gstaad, Switzerland	Clay	(Philippines) Eric Taino	(United States) Donald Johnson (Czech Republic) Cyril Suk	5–7, 6–7^{(4–7)}
Loss	4.	Jul 1999	Stuttgart, Germany	Clay	(United States) Jack Waite	(Brazil) Jaime Oncins (Argentina) Daniel Orsanic	2–6, 1–6
Win	2.	Oct 1999	Basel, Switzerland	Carpet	(South Africa) Brent Haygarth	(Czech Republic) Jiří Novák (Czech Republic) David Rikl	0–6, 6–4, 7–5
Win	3.	Sep 2001	Bucharest, Romania	Clay	(Sweden) Johan Landsberg	(Argentina) Pablo Albano (Germany) Marc-Kevin Goellner	6–4, 6–7^{(5–7)}, [10–6]
