= Juan-Martín Aranguren =

Argentine tennis player

Juan Martín Aranguren
- Country (sports): Argentina
- Residence: Buenos Aires, Argentina
- Born: 7 October 1983 (age 41); Buenos Aires, Argentina h
- Turned pro: 2003
- Plays: Right-handed (one-handed backhand)
- Prize money: $165,656

Singles
- Career record: 0–2
- Career titles: 0; 0 Challenger, 11 Futures
- Highest ranking: No. 184 (19 October 2009)

Grand Slam singles results
- Australian Open: Q1 (2008)
- French Open: Q1 (2008)
- Wimbledon: Q1 (2008, 2010)

Doubles
- Career record: 0-2
- Career titles: 0; 4 Challenger, 11 Futures
- Highest ranking: No. 160 (28 September 2009)
- Last updated on: 28 April 2021.

Juan Martín Aranguren (born 10 July 1983) is a retired Argentine professional tennis player who played primarily ITF and Challengers events.

Aranguren made his ATP Tour debut at the 2006 Romanian Open in Bucharest, when he successfully advanced through three qualifying rounds to reach the main draw. He defeated Sergiy Stakhovsky 6–4, 3–6, 7–5, Laurentiu-Antoniu Erlic 6–0, 6–3 and Adrian Ungur 7–6^{(7–5)}, 6–4 before being eliminated by second seed and eventual semi-finalist Florent Serra 1–6, 0–6 in the first round. The following year at the 2007 Romanian Open he received a wild card entry into the doubles main draw, alongside compatriot Gustavo Marcaccio where they were defeated in the first round by Sergio Roitman and Filippo Volandri 2–6, 4–6. He would go on to receive entry into the 2008 Buenos Aires Open main draw as an alternate pair, alongside another compatriot Diego Junqueira but again lost in the first round this time to Peter Luczak and Werner Eschauer in a three setter 6–4, 3–6, 13–15.

His next and final ATP main draw appearance wouldn't come until four years later in singles where he would qualify for the 2010 Chile Open in similar fashion. He defeated Federico Delbonis 7–6^{(7–3)}, 5–7, 6–1 Gastón Gaudio 3–6, 6–3, 6–1, and Boris Pašanski 6–3, 6–1 before losing in the first round to fellow qualifier David Marrero in three tight sets 6–7^{(4–7)}, 6–2, 6–7^{(2–7)}.

== ATP Challenger and ITF Futures finals ==
=== Singles: 21 (11–10) ===
Legend ATP Challenger (0–1) ITF Futures (11–9)	Finals by surface Hard (0–0) Clay (11–10) Grass (0–0) Carpet (0–0)

Result	W–L	Date	Tournament	Tier	Surface	Opponent	Score
Loss	0–1	Aug 2005	Argentina F7, Buenos Aires	Futures	Clay	(Argentina) Lionel Noviski	1–6, 3–6
Win	1–1	Sep 2005	Argentina F9, Buenos Aires	Futures	Clay	(Argentina) Agustin Tarantino	7–6^{(7–4)}, 1–6, 6–1
Win	2–1	Sep 2005	Uruguay F1, Montevideo	Futures	Clay	(Uruguay) Pablo Cuevas	6–2, 6–2
Win	3–1	Sep 2005	Argentina F12, Buenos Aires	Futures	Clay	(Argentina) Agustin Tarantino	6–2, 6–0
Loss	3–2	Oct 2005	Bolivia F1, Cochabamba	Futures	Clay	(Argentina) Agustin Tarantino	4–6, 4–6
Loss	3–3	Apr 2006	Uruguay F2, Montevideo	Futures	Clay	(Argentina) Cristian Villagrán	2–6, 3–6
Loss	3–4	May 2006	Argentina F8, Mendoza	Futures	Clay	(Argentina) Horacio Zeballos	6–7^{(2–7)}, 7–6^{(7–3)}, 4–6
Loss	3–5	Apr 2007	Argentina F1, Santa Fe	Futures	Clay	(Argentina) Eduardo Schwank	3–6, 2–6
Loss	3–6	May 2007	Argentina F2, Buenos Aires	Futures	Clay	(Argentina) Eduardo Schwank	4–6, 4–6
Win	4–6	Jun 2007	Argentina F9, Ospaca	Futures	Clay	(Argentina) Jonathan Gonzalia	6–4, 6–3
Win	5–6	Aug 2007	Argentina F10, Corrientes	Futures	Clay	(Argentina) Leandro Migani	6–3, 6–0
Win	6–6	Oct 2007	Argentina F17, Buenos Aires	Futures	Clay	(Argentina) Leandro Migani	6–0, 6–2
Win	7–6	Nov 2008	Argentina F14, Buenos Aires	Futures	Clay	(Argentina) Lionel Noviski	6–3, 6–4
Win	8–6	Nov 2008	Peru F5, Lima	Futures	Clay	(Latvia) Deniss Pavlovs	6–3, 7–5
Win	9–6	Jun 2009	Argentina F10, Posadas	Futures	Clay	(Argentina) Alejandro Fabbri	7–6^{(7–4)}, 6–4
Loss	9–7	Sep 2009	Como, Italy	Challenger	Clay	(Ukraine) Alexandr Dolgopolov	5–7, 6–7^{(5–7)}
Loss	9–8	May 2010	Italy F6, Vicenza	Futures	Clay	(Russia) Ilya Belyaev	3–6, 2–6
Loss	9–9	May 2011	Italy F7, Vicenza	Futures	Clay	(Netherlands) Matwé Middelkoop	5–7, 6–2, 4–6
Win	10–9	Sep 2011	Argentina F14, Mar del Plata	Futures	Clay	(Argentina) Pablo Galdón	6–3, 1–6, 6–4
Win	11–9	Mar 2012	Argentina F1, Carilo	Futures	Clay	(Argentina) Juan-Pablo Amado	6–3, 7–6^{(7–2)}
Loss	11–10	Mar 2012	Argentina F2, Dolores	Futures	Clay	(Argentina) Nicolas Pastor	6–1, 2–6, 6–7^{(2–7)}

=== Doubles: 32 (15–17) ===
Legend ATP Challenger (4–1) ITF Futures (11–16)	Finals by surface Hard (0–1) Clay (15–16) Grass (0–0) Carpet (0–0)

Result	W–L	Date	Tournament	Tier	Surface	Partner	Opponents	Score
Loss	0–1	Jul 2003	Ecuador F1, Guayaquil	Futures	Hard	(Argentina) Diego Cristin	(Argentina) Sebastián Decoud (Colombia) Pablo González	4–6, 5–7
Loss	0–2	Aug 2003	Argentins F2, Buenos Aires	Futures	Clay	(Argentina) Matias De Genaro	(Italy) Enzo Artoni (Argentina) Gustavo Marcaccio	6–4, 2–6, 3–6
Loss	0–3	May 2004	Argentins F2, Buenos Aires	Futures	Clay	(Argentina) Sebastián Decoud	(Argentina) Eduardo Schwank (Argentina) Juan-Pablo Amado	1–6, 6–7^{(6–8)}
Loss	0–4	May 2004	Bosnia & Herzegovina F2, Brčko	Futures	Clay	(Argentina) Juan-Cruz Vesprini	(Serbia and Montenegro) Goran Tošić (Serbia and Montenegro) Nikola Ćirić	2–6, 3–6
Win	1–4	Jun 2004	Bosnia & Herzegovina F3, Prijedor	Futures	Clay	(Argentina) Lionel Noviski	(Serbia and Montenegro) Goran Tošić (Serbia and Montenegro) Nikola Ćirić	6–4, 6–3
Loss	1–5	Jun 2004	Serbia & Montenegro F1, Sombor	Futures	Clay	(Argentina) Lionel Noviski	(Serbia and Montenegro) Goran Tošić (Serbia and Montenegro) Nikola Ćirić	6–3, 6–7^{(5–7)}, 3–6
Loss	1–6	Jun 2004	Serbia & Montenegro F2, Belgrade	Futures	Clay	(Argentina) Lionel Noviski	(Serbia and Montenegro) David Savić (Serbia and Montenegro) Ilija Bozoljac	2–6, 2–6
Loss	1–7	Jul 2004	Romania F9, Balș	Futures	Clay	(Belgium) Dominique Coene	(Romania) Gabriel Moraru (Romania) Horia Tecău	0–6, 6–4, 2–6
Win	2–7	Aug 2004	Chile F1A, Santiago	Futures	Clay	(Argentina) Patricio Rudi	(Argentina) Rodolfo Daruich (Argentina) Diego Junqueira	1–6, 6–3, 6–3
Loss	2–8	Oct 2004	Bolivia F2, Santa Cruz	Futures	Clay	(Argentina) Cristian Villagrán	(Brazil) Thiago Alves (Brazil) Júlio Silva	3–6, 7–5, 0–6
Loss	2–9	Apr 2005	Chile F1, Santiago	Futures	Clay	(Argentina) Patricio Rudi	(Argentina) Brian Dabul (Argentina) Damián Patriarca	2–6, 6–4, 2–6
Loss	2–10	Apr 2007	France F6, Angers	Futures	Clay	(Argentina) Sebastian Uriarte	(Australia) Joseph Sirianni (Germany) Dominik Meffert	1–6, 1–6
Loss	2–11	Jul 2007	France F10, Bourg-en-Bresse	Futures	Clay	(France) Xavier Audouy	(France) Jean-Baptiste Perlant (France) Xavier Pujo	2–6, 2–6
Win	3–11	Mar 2008	Italy F4, Caltanissetta	Futures	Clay	(Argentina) Juan-Francisco Spina	(Serbia) Miljan Zekić (Serbia) Nikola Ćirić	walkover
Win	4–11	Mar 2008	Egypt F1, Cairo	Futures	Clay	(Argentina) Alejandro Fabbri	(Egypt) Sherif Sabry (Egypt) Karim Maamoun	7–5, 6–4
Loss	4–12	Apr 2008	Italy F7, Rome	Futures	Clay	(Argentina) Alejandro Fabbri	(Argentina) Juan-Pablo Villar (Argentina) Jonathan Gonzalia	6–3, 6–7^{(5–7)}, [7–10]
Win	5–12	Jun 2008	Sassuolo, Italy	Challenger	Clay	(Italy) Stefano Galvani	(Spain) J.A. Sánchez de Luna (Spain) Rubén Ramírez Hidalgo	5–7, 6–2, [10–8]
Loss	5–13	Jun 2008	Milan, Italy	Challenger	Clay	(Spain) Marc Fornell Mestres	(Switzerland) Yves Allegro (Romania) Horia Tecău	4–6, 4–6
Win	6–13	Oct 2008	Aracaju, Brazil	Challenger	Clay	(Brazil) Franco Ferreiro	(Brazil) Thiago Alves (Brazil) João Souza	6–4, 6–4
Loss	6–14	May 2009	Italy F9, Aosta	Futures	Clay	(Argentina) Alejandro Fabbri	(Argentina) Leandro Migani (Chile) Guillermo Hormazábal	5–7, 6–2, [8–10]
Win	7–14	May 2009	Italy F10, Pozzuoli	Futures	Clay	(Argentina) Alejandro Fabbri	(Italy) Walter Trusendi (Italy) Leonardo Azzaro	6–4, 6–4
Win	8–14	May 2009	Italy F11, Parma	Futures	Clay	(Italy) Walter Trusendi	(Australia) Greg Jones (Netherlands) Antal van der Duim	6–2, 6–3
Win	9–14	Jun 2009	Italy F14, Mestre	Futures	Clay	(Italy) Federico Torresi	(Australia) Kaden Hensel (Australia) Adam Hubble	7–5, 6–1
Loss	9–15	Aug 2009	Germany F12, Dortmund	Futures	Clay	(United States) Rylan Rizza	(Czech Republic) Jaroslav Pospíšil (France) Alexandre Renard	4–6, 6–4, [4–10]
Win	10–15	Aug 2009	Geneva, Switzerland	Challenger	Clay	(Argentina) Diego Álvarez	(Finland) Henri Laaksonen (Austria) Philipp Oswald	6–4, 4–6, [10–2]
Win	11–15	Nov 2009	Lima, Peru	Challenger	Clay	(Argentina) Martín Alund	(Chile) Guillermo Rivera Aránguiz (Chile) Cristóbal Saavedra Corvalán	6–2, 7–6^{(7–4)}
Loss	11–16	Apr 2010	Italy F4, Vercelli	Futures	Clay	(Argentina) Alejandro Fabbri	(Russia) Ilya Belyaev (Russia) Andrey Kuznetsov	4–6, 6–7^{(2–7)}
Win	12–16	May 2010	Italy F8, Pozzuoli	Futures	Clay	(Argentina) Alejandro Fabbri	(United Kingdom) Dan Evans (Lithuania) Laurynas Grigelis	6–4, 7–6^{(7–4)}
Win	13–16	May 2010	Italy F10, Cesena	Futures	Clay	(Argentina) Alejandro Fabbri	(Spain) Pablo Santos González (Spain) Gabriel Trujillo Soler	6–2, 7–6^{(7–2)}
Win	14–16	Aug 2010	Germany F11, Wetzlar	Futures	Clay	(Argentina) Diego Álvarez	(Czech Republic) Radek Zahraj (Germany) Andre Begemann	6–4, 6–2
Loss	14–17	May 2011	Italy F7, Vicenza	Futures	Clay	(Argentina) Alejandro Fabbri	(Serbia) Ivan Bjelica (Netherlands) Matwé Middelkoop	4–6, 4–6
Win	15–17	Jun 2011	Italy F13, Parma	Futures	Clay	(Argentina) Alejandro Fabbri	(Italy) Gianluca Naso (Italy) Omar Giacalone	6–4, 7–6^{(7–5)}
