= Arenele BNR =

Tennis complex in Bucharest, Romania

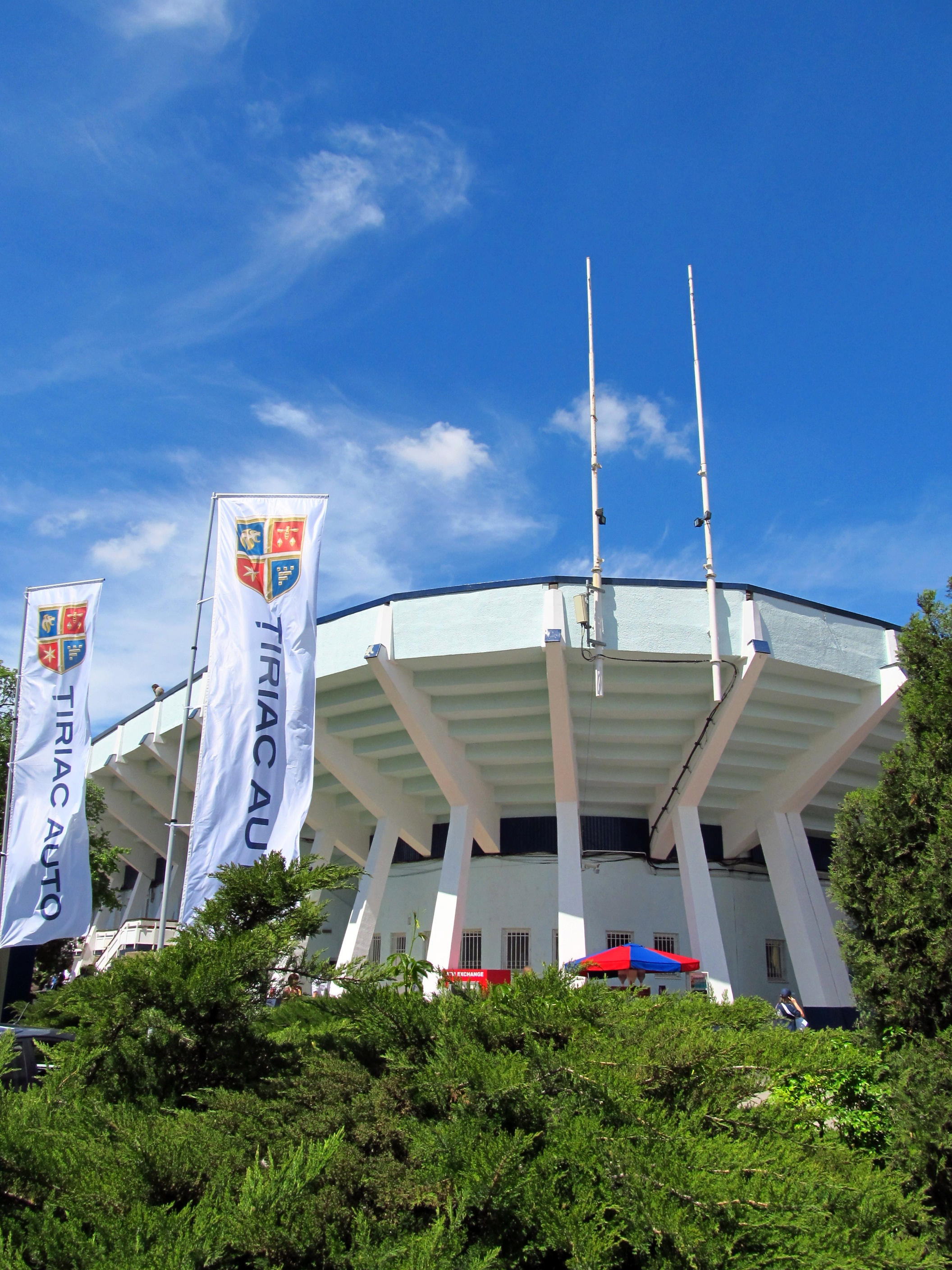
- The main court in 2012
- Interactive map of Arenele BNR
- Location: Strada Dr. Staicovici nr. 42-46, sector 5, Bucharest, Romania
- Coordinates: 44°25′51″N 26°04′36″E
- Capacity: 5,000 (tennis)
- Surface: Clay, Outdoors

Construction
- Opened: 1972

Tenants
- Bucharest Open (WTA International) (2014–2019); BRD Năstase Țiriac Trophy (ATP 250) (1993–2016)

The Arenele BNR (English: BNR Arenas) are a complex of tennis venues located in Bucharest, Romania. The central court has a capacity of 5,000 seats and the whole facility contains 11 courts. They are named after the National Bank of Romania (BNR).

They host the Bucharest Open (part of the WTA Tour and played annually in July after Wimbledon).

They also hosted the traditional Romanian Open, also known as the BRD Năstase Țiriac Trophy, that was part of the ATP World Tour for 24 editions.

== See also ==
- List of tennis stadiums by capacity

Events and tenants
Preceded by Olde Providence Racquet Club, Charlotte, North Carolina United States	Davis Cup; Final Venue; 1972	Succeeded by Public Auditorium, Cleveland United States
