= Romanian Open =

Men's tennis tournament in Bucharest

Coordinates: 44.431°N 26.077°E

Țiriac Open

ATP Tour
- Event name: Romanian Open (1993–1998); Gelsor Open Romania (1999–2001); Open Romania (2002); BCR Open Romania (2003–2010); BRD Năstase Țiriac Trophy (2011–2016); Țiriac Open (2024–)
- Tour: ATP World Series (1993–1999); ATP International Series (2000–2008); ATP 250 (2009–2016, 2024–)
- Founded: 1993; 33 years ago
- Editions: 27 (2026)
- Location: Bucharest, Romania
- Venue: Arenele BNR (1993–2016); Năstase–Marica Sports Club (2024); Simona Halep National Tennis Centre (2025–)
- Surface: Clay, outdoors
- Draw: 28S / 16Q / 16D
- Prize money: €612,620 (2026)
- Website: Official website

The Țiriac Open, also known by its original name, the Romanian Open, is a professional men's tennis tournament held in Bucharest, Romania. Played on outdoor clay courts, it is an ATP 250 event on the ATP Tour. Established in 1993, the tournament was held annually until 2016 before returning in 2024 under its current name. The tournament's ATP licence is owned by former Romanian tennis player Ion Țiriac.

== History ==
The tournament was first held in 1993 at Arenele BNR, a tennis complex in Bucharest, where it remained until 2016. Originally known as the Romanian Open and later the BCR Open Romania, it was renamed the BRD Năstase Țiriac Trophy in 2011 in honour of former Romanian tennis players Ilie Năstase and Ion Țiriac. Initially scheduled in September, the tournament moved to April in 2012 to coincide with the European clay-court season.

The tournament left Bucharest after the 2016 edition due to problems with the infrastructure at Arenele BNR. The complex's main stadium could no longer be used because it lacked the required fire safety approval, forcing matches to be played on secondary courts. Renovation of the main stadium was further complicated by legal restrictions on investments by the National Bank of Romania (BNR), which owned the complex. In 2017, Ion Țiriac made a public offer to purchase the sports complex from the BNR, with the aim of renovating it and bringing international tennis competitions back to the venue. Later that year, Țiriac, Ilie Năstase, Simona Halep and other athletes filed a lawsuit seeking recognition of the Romanian state's ownership of the complex and annulment of the 1991 agreement under which it had been transferred to the BNR.

The tournament was relocated to Budapest, Hungary, in 2017, where it was held as the Hungarian Open until 2019. The event subsequently moved to Belgrade, Serbia, in 2021, where it was held as the Serbia Open for two years, before being temporarily relocated to Banja Luka, Bosnia and Herzegovina, as the Srpska Open in 2023.

The tournament returned to Bucharest in 2024 under the name Țiriac Open, with its first edition since the relocation held at the Năstase–Marica Sports Club. In 2025, it moved to the National Tennis Centre in Bucharest, which also hosted the 2026 edition.

Plans have been announced to relocate the tournament to a new tennis complex in Otopeni, north of Bucharest, as part of a larger sports development led by Ion Țiriac. Known as Țiriac Sport Center, the development is planned to include a tennis academy with 30 courts and a 5,000-seat main stadium designed to meet ATP requirements. As of October 2026, construction of the tennis facilities was underway, with George Cosac, president of the Romanian Tennis Federation, stating that the tennis complex, including the main stadium, was expected to be completed by the end of 2027.

== Notable results ==
Gilles Simon holds the record for the most singles titles at the tournament, winning in 2007, 2008 and 2012. Victor Hănescu became the first Romanian player to reach the singles final in 2007, losing to Simon.

Romanian players have enjoyed greater success in doubles. Andrei Pavel and Gabriel Trifu won the title in 1998, while Marius Copil and Adrian Ungur won in 2015. Horia Tecău holds the tournament record with four doubles titles, winning three consecutive editions from 2012 to 2014, each with a different partner, and a fourth title alongside Florin Mergea in 2016.

== Past finals ==
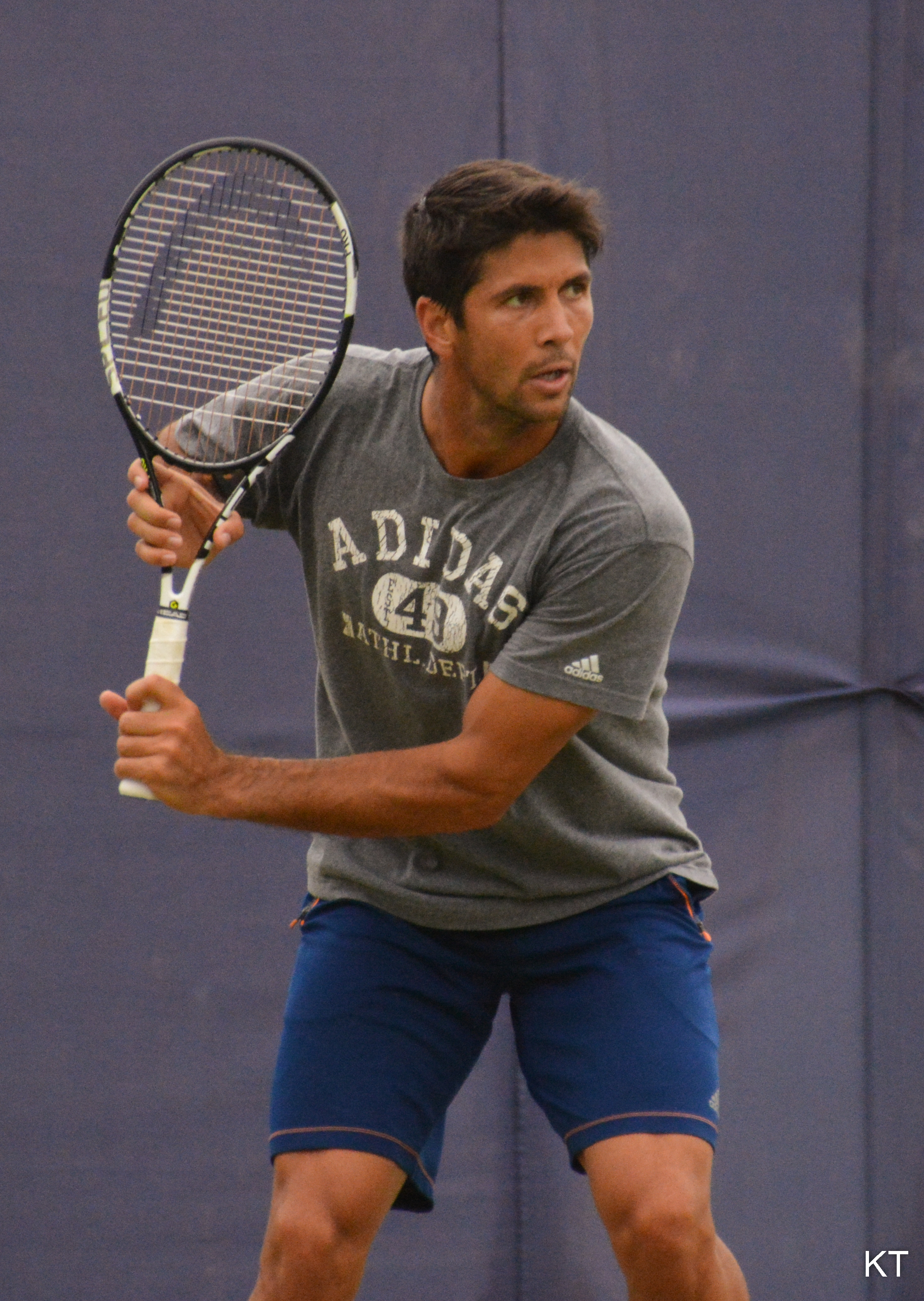
Fernando Verdasco grabbed the title of the Romanian Open in 2016.

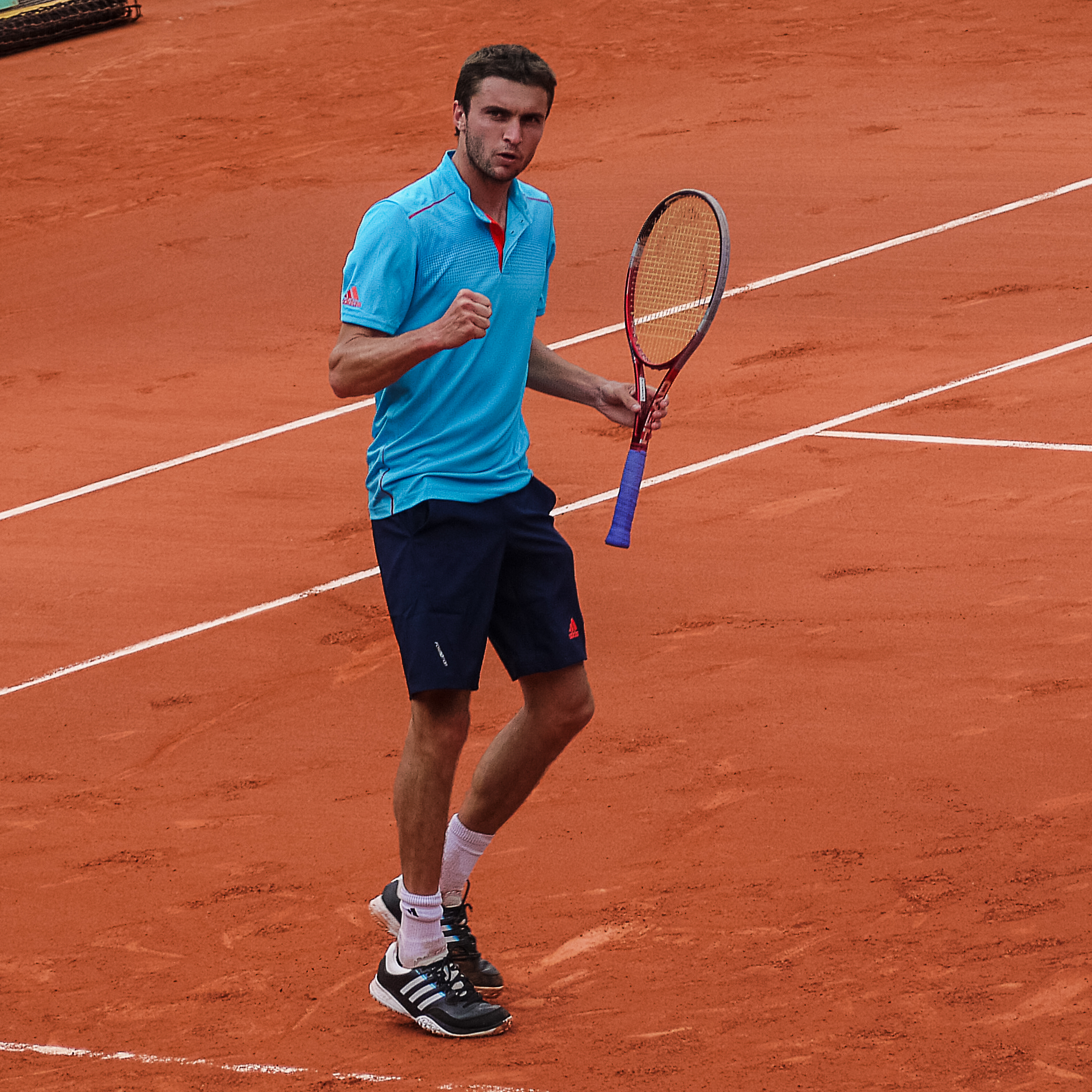
Gilles Simon (winner in 2007, 2008 & 2012) holds the record in Bucharest, for the most titles (three).

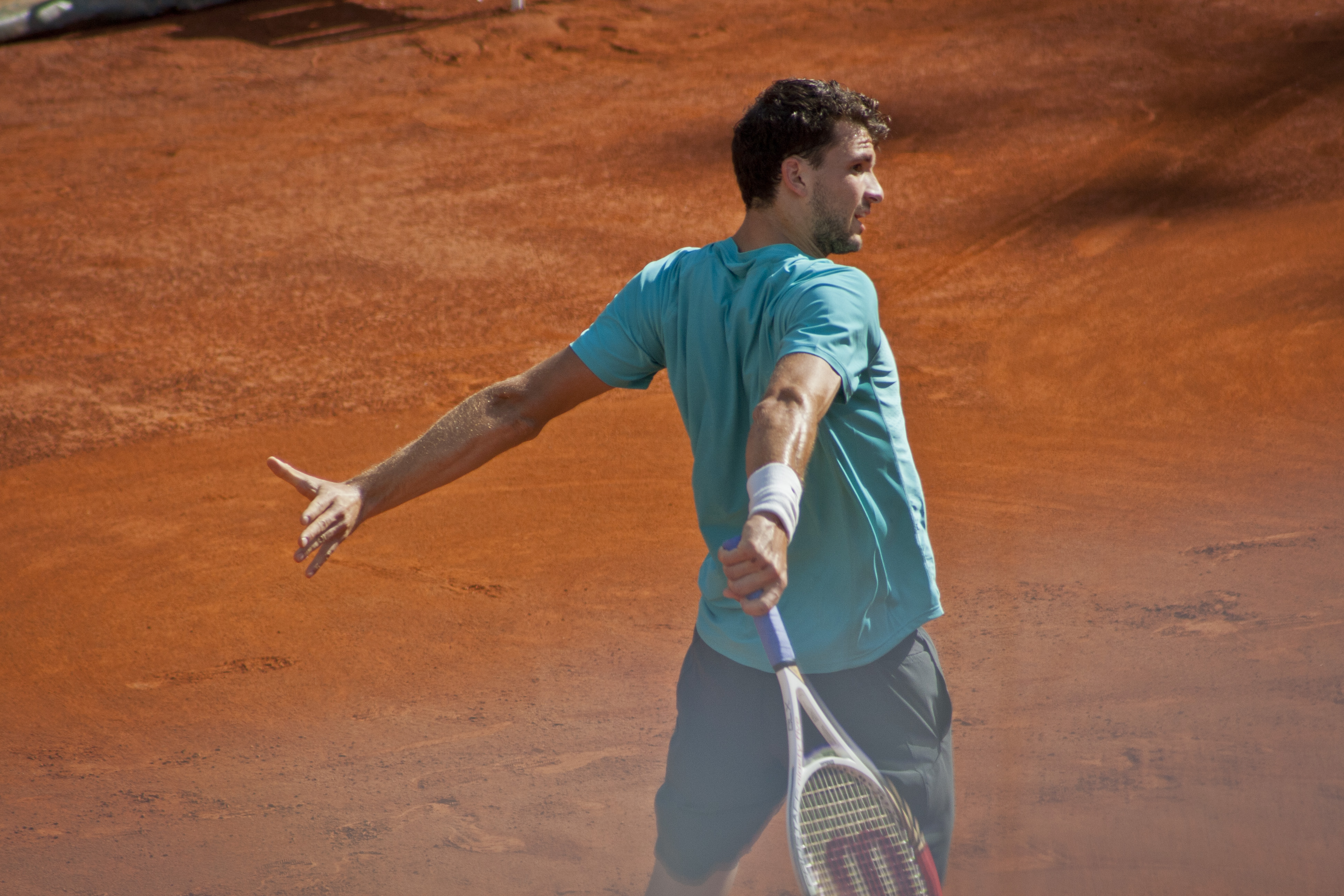
Grigor Dimitrov clinched Bucharest crown in 2014.

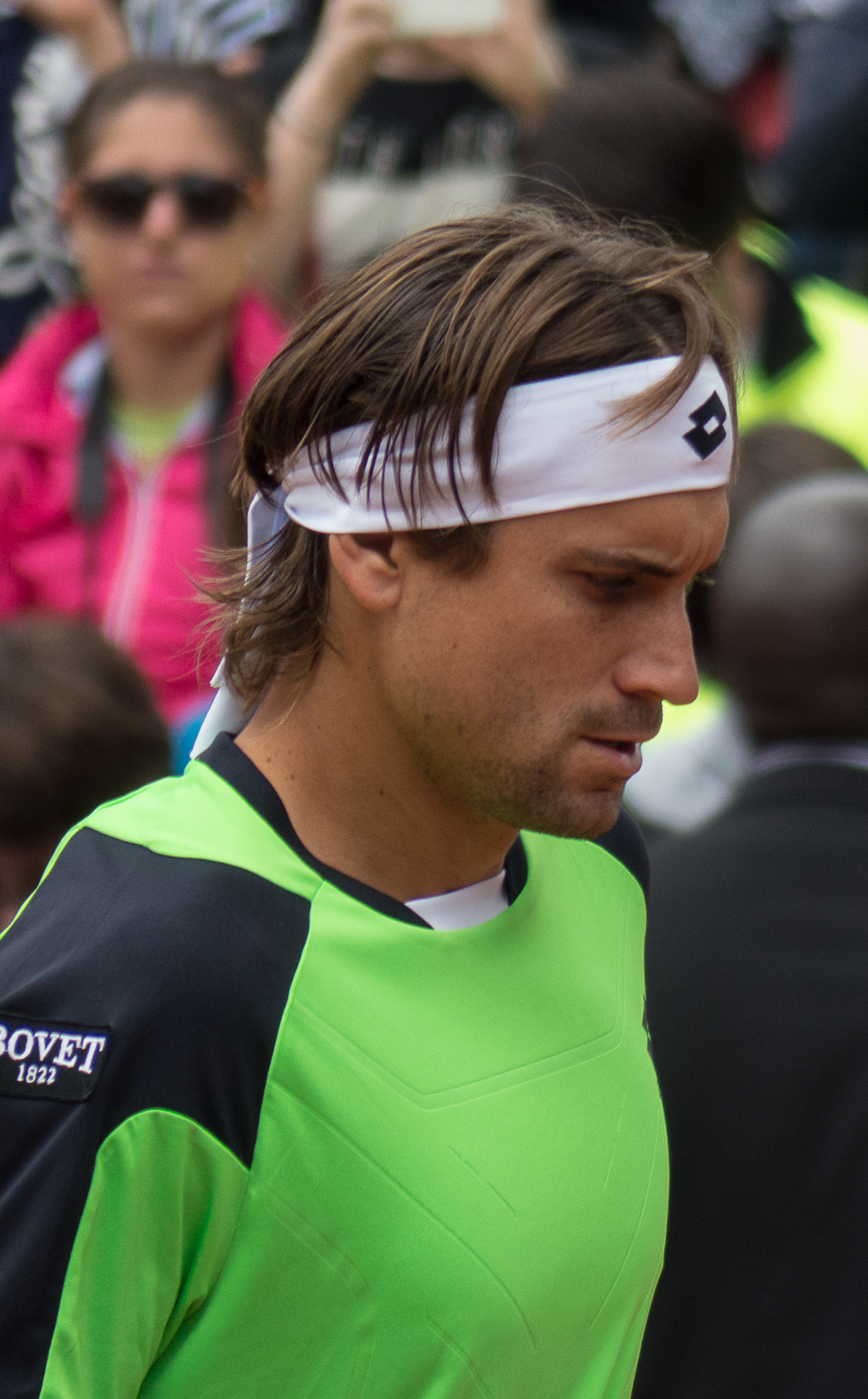
David Ferrer won his first ATP title in Romania in 2002.

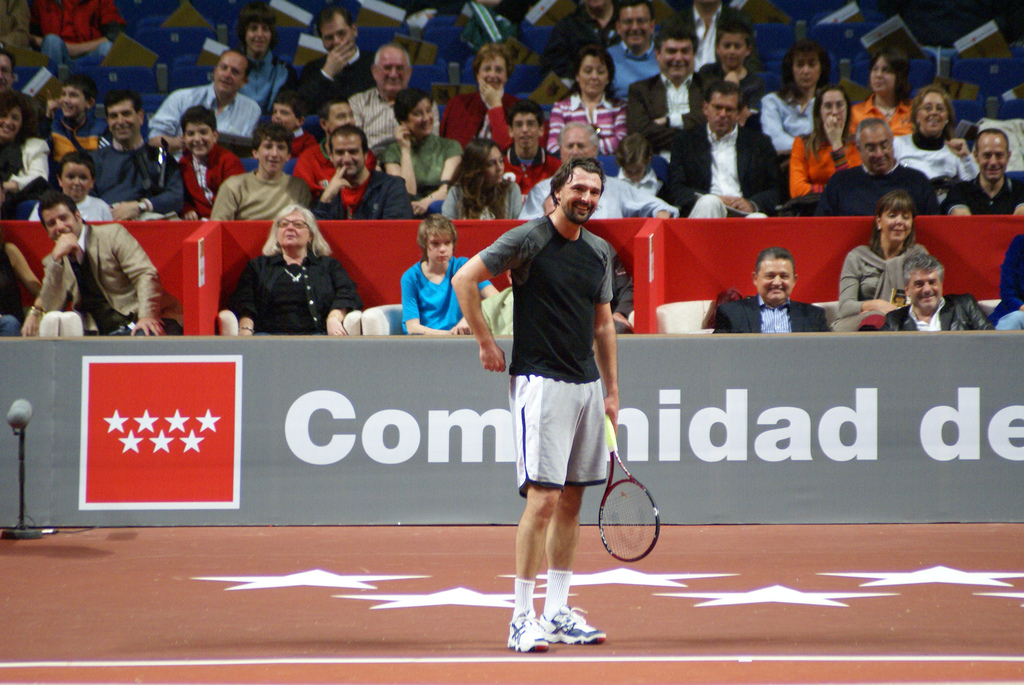
Goran Ivanišević was the winner of the first edition of the tournament in 1993.

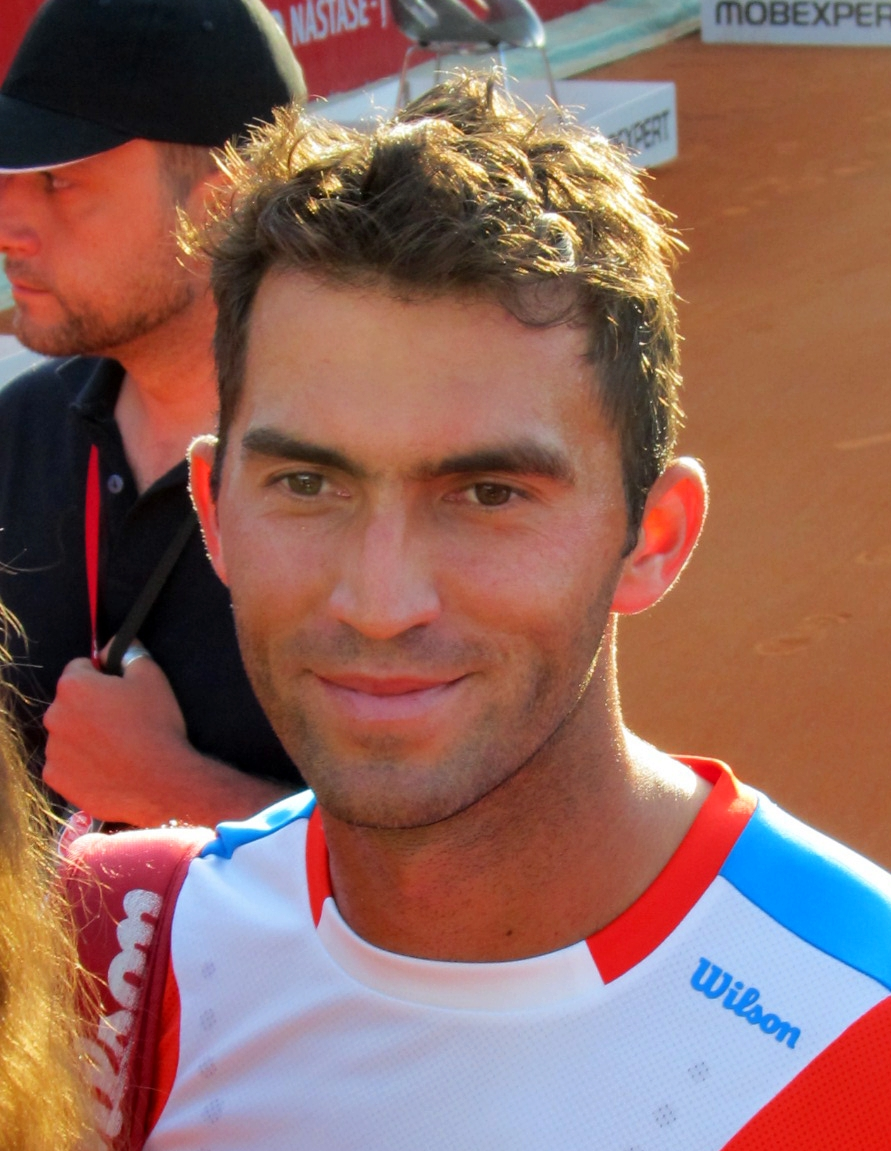
Horia Tecău (2012, 2013, 2014 & 2016) took a record of four doubles titles at the tournament, each time with a different partner.

=== Singles ===
Year	Champions	Runners-up	Score
1993	(Croatia) Goran Ivanišević	(Russia) Andrei Cherkasov	6–2, 7–6^{(7–5)}
1994	(Argentina) Franco Davín	(Croatia) Goran Ivanišević	6–2, 6–4
1995	(Austria) Thomas Muster	(Austria) Gilbert Schaller	6–3, 6–4
1996	(Spain) Alberto Berasategui	(Spain) Carlos Moyá	6–1, 7–6^{(7–5)}
1997	(Australia) Richard Fromberg	(Italy) Andrea Gaudenzi	6–1, 7–6^{(7–2)}
1998	(Spain) Francisco Clavet	(France) Arnaud Di Pasquale	6–4, 2–6, 7–5
1999	(Spain) Alberto Martín	(Morocco) Karim Alami	6–3, 6–2
2000	(Spain) Juan Balcells	(Germany) Markus Hantschk	6–3, 3–6, 7–6^{(7–1)}
2001	(Morocco) Younes El Aynaoui	(Spain) Albert Montañés	7–6^{(7–5)}, 7–6^{(7–2)}
2002	(Spain) David Ferrer	(Argentina) José Acasuso	6–3, 6–2
2003	(Spain) David Sánchez	(Chile) Nicolás Massú	6–2, 6–2
2004	(Argentina) José Acasuso	(Russia) Igor Andreev	6–3, 6–0
2005	(France) Florent Serra	(Russia) Igor Andreev	6–3, 6–4
2006	(Austria) Jürgen Melzer	(Italy) Filippo Volandri	6–1, 7–5
2007	(France) Gilles Simon	(Romania) Victor Hănescu	4–6, 6–3, 6–2
2008	(France) Gilles Simon (2)	(Spain) Carlos Moyá	6–3, 6–4
2009	(Spain) Albert Montañés	(Argentina) Juan Mónaco	7–6^{(7–2)}, 7–6^{(8–6)}
2010	(Argentina) Juan Ignacio Chela	(Spain) Pablo Andújar	7–5, 6–1
2011	(Germany) Florian Mayer	(Spain) Pablo Andújar	6–3, 6–1
2012	(France) Gilles Simon (3)	(Italy) Fabio Fognini	6–4, 6–3
2013	(Czech Republic) Lukáš Rosol	(Spain) Guillermo García-López	6–3, 6–2
2014	(Bulgaria) Grigor Dimitrov	(Czech Republic) Lukáš Rosol	7–6^{(7–2)}, 6–1
2015	(Spain) Guillermo García-López	(Czech Republic) Jiří Veselý	7–6^{(7–5)}, 7–6^{(13–11)}
2016	(Spain) Fernando Verdasco	(France) Lucas Pouille	6–3, 6–2
2017- 2023	replaced by Hungarian Open, Serbia Open and Srpska Open		
2024	(Hungary) Márton Fucsovics	(Argentina) Mariano Navone	6–4, 7–5
2025	(Italy) Flavio Cobolli	(Argentina) Sebastián Báez	6–4, 6–4
2026	(Argentina) Mariano Navone	(Spain) Daniel Mérida	6–2, 4–6, 7–5

=== Doubles ===
Year	Champions	Runners-up	Score
1993	(Netherlands) Menno Oosting (Belgium) Libor Pimek	(Romania) George Cosac (Romania) Ciprian Petre Porumb	7–6, 7–6
1994	(Australia) Wayne Arthurs (Australia) Simon Youl	(Spain) Jordi Arrese (Spain) José Antonio Conde	6–4, 6–4
1995	(United States) Mark Keil (United States) Jeff Tarango	(Czech Republic) Cyril Suk (Czech Republic) Daniel Vacek	6–4, 7–6
1996	(Sweden) David Ekerot (United States) Jeff Tarango (2)	(South Africa) David Adams (Netherlands) Menno Oosting	7–6, 7–6
1997	(Argentina) Luis Lobo (Spain) Javier Sánchez	(Netherlands) Hendrik Jan Davids (Argentina) Daniel Orsanic	7–5, 7–5
1998	(Romania) Andrei Pavel (Romania) Gabriel Trifu	(Romania) George Cosac (Romania) Dinu Pescariu	7–6, 7–6
1999	(Argentina) Lucas Arnold Ker (Argentina) Martín García	(Germany) Marc-Kevin Goellner (United States) Francisco Montana	6–3, 2–6, 6–3
2000	(Spain) Alberto Martín (Israel) Eyal Ran	(United States) Devin Bowen (Argentina) Mariano Hood	7–6^{(7–4)}, 6–1
2001	(North Macedonia) Aleksandar Kitinov (Sweden) Johan Landsberg	(Argentina) Pablo Albano (Germany) Marc-Kevin Goellner	6–4, 6–7^{(5–7)}, [10–6]
2002	(Germany) Jens Knippschild (Sweden) Peter Nyborg	(Spain) Emilio Benfele Álvarez (Argentina) Andrés Schneiter	6–3, 6–3
2003	(Germany) Karsten Braasch (Armenia) Sargis Sargsian	(Sweden) Simon Aspelin (South Africa) Jeff Coetzee	7–6^{(9–7)}, 6–2
2004	(Argentina) Lucas Arnold Ker (2) (Argentina) Mariano Hood	(Argentina) José Acasuso (Spain) Óscar Hernández	7–6^{(7–5)}, 6–1
2005	(Argentina) José Acasuso (Argentina) Sebastián Prieto	(Romania) Victor Hănescu (Romania) Andrei Pavel	6–3, 4–6, 6–3
2006	(Poland) Mariusz Fyrstenberg (Poland) Marcin Matkowski	(Argentina) Martín García (Peru) Luis Horna	6–7^{(5–7)}, 7–6^{(7–5)}, [10–8]
2007	(Austria) Oliver Marach (Slovakia) Michal Mertiňák	(Argentina) Martín García (Argentina) Sebastián Prieto	7–6^{(7–2)}, 7–6^{(10–8)}
2008	(France) Nicolas Devilder (France) Paul-Henri Mathieu	(Poland) Mariusz Fyrstenberg (Poland) Marcin Matkowski	7–6^{(7–4)}, 6–7^{(9–11)}, [22–20]
2009	(Czech Republic) František Čermák (Slovakia) Michal Mertiňák (2)	(Sweden) Johan Brunström (Netherlands Antilles) Jean-Julien Rojer	6–2, 6–4
2010	(Argentina) Juan Ignacio Chela (Poland) Łukasz Kubot	(Spain) Marcel Granollers (Spain) Santiago Ventura	6–2, 5–7, [13–11]
2011	(Italy) Daniele Bracciali (Italy) Potito Starace	(Austria) Julian Knowle (Spain) David Marrero	3–6, 6–4, [10–8]
2012	(Sweden) Robert Lindstedt (Romania) Horia Tecău	(France) Jérémy Chardy (Poland) Łukasz Kubot	7–6^{(7–2)}, 6–3
2013	(Belarus) Max Mirnyi (Romania) Horia Tecău (2)	(Czech Republic) Lukáš Dlouhý (Austria) Oliver Marach	4–6, 6–4, [10–6]
2014	(Netherlands) Jean-Julien Rojer (Romania) Horia Tecău (3)	(Poland) Mariusz Fyrstenberg (Poland) Marcin Matkowski	6–4, 6–4
2015	(Romania) Marius Copil (Romania) Adrian Ungur	(United States) Nicholas Monroe (New Zealand) Artem Sitak	3–6, 7–5, [17–15]
2016	(Romania) Florin Mergea (Romania) Horia Tecău (4)	(Australia) Chris Guccione (Brazil) André Sá	7–5, 6–4
2017- 2023	replaced by Hungarian Open, Serbia Open and Srpska Open		
2024	(France) Sadio Doumbia (France) Fabien Reboul	(Finland) Harri Heliövaara (United Kingdom) Henry Patten	6–3, 7–5
2025	(Spain) Marcel Granollers (Argentina) Horacio Zeballos	(Germany) Jakob Schnaitter (Germany) Mark Wallner	7–6^{(7–3)}, 6–4
2026	(France) Sadio Doumbia (2) (France) Fabien Reboul (2)	(Czech Republic) Adam Pavlásek (Czech Republic) Patrik Rikl	6–1, 6–4

== See also ==
- Transylvania Open
- Bucharest Open
- Winners Open
- List of tennis tournaments
