= 2004 Abierto Mexicano de Tenis Telefonica Movistar – Women's doubles =

Women's doubles
- 2004 Abierto Mexicano de Tenis Telefonica Movistar

Final
- Champions: (Australia) Lisa McShea (Venezuela) Milagros Sequera
- Runners-up: (Czech Republic) Olga Blahotová (Czech Republic) Gabriela Navrátilová
- Score: 2–6, 7–6^{(7–5)}, 6–4

Events
Singles	men	women
Doubles	men	women
← 2003 ·	Mexican Open	· 2005 →

Émilie Loit and Åsa Svensson were the defending champions, but had different outcomes. While Svensson did not compete this year, Loit teamed up with Marion Bartoli and reached the semifinals before losing to Olga Blahotová and Gabriela Navrátilová.

Lisa McShea and Milagros Sequera won the title, by defeating Blahotová and Navrátilová 2–6, 7–6^{(7–5)}, 6–4 in the final. It was the 2nd title for McShea and the 1st title for Sequera in their respective doubles careers. It was also the 1st title for the pair during this season.

== Seeds ==
1. (France) Marion Bartoli / (France) Émilie Loit (semifinals)
2. (Switzerland) Emmanuelle Gagliardi / (Austria) Patricia Wartusch (semifinals)
3. (Italy) Tathiana Garbin / (Italy) Rita Grande (first round)
4. (Australia) Lisa McShea / (Venezuela) Milagros Sequera (champions)

== Draw ==
=== Key ===
- Q = Qualifier
- WC = Wild card
- LL = Lucky loser
- Alt = Alternate
- SE = Special exempt
- PR = Protected ranking
- ITF = ITF entry
- JE = Junior exempt
- w/o = Walkover
- r = Retired
- d = Defaulted
- SR = Special ranking

=== Draw ===
First round
1	(France) M Bartoli (France) É Loit	6	6
(United States) J Embry (United States) M Washington	1	4
(United States) S Reeves (Italy) Ad Serra Zanetti	6^{4}	4
(Spain) MJ Martínez Sánchez (Spain) C Martínez Granados	7^{7}	6
3	(Italy) T Garbin (Italy) R Grande	4	2
LL	(Czech Republic) O Blahotová (Czech Republic) G Navrátilová	6	6
(Czech Republic) I Benešová (Czech Republic) R Voráčová	5	6	6
WC	(Mexico) D Múñoz Gallegos (Mexico) M Torres Sandoval	7	0	2
(Italy) F Pennetta (Argentina) P Tarabini	3	6	5
(Australia) B Stewart (Australia) S Stosur	6	4	7
(Hungary) M Czink (Russia) A Jidkova	3	2
4	(Australia) L McShea (Venezuela) M Sequera	6	6
(Romania) R Dragomir Ilie (Ukraine) T Perebiynis	6	7^{7}
(Japan) S Asagoe (United States) L Osterloh	2	6^{4}
Q	(Spain) M Marrero (Italy) An Serra Zanetti	6^{4}	6	3
2	(Switzerland) E Gagliardi (Austria) P Wartusch	7^{7}	1	6

Quarterfinals
1	(France) M Bartoli (France) É Loit	6	1	6
(Spain) MJ Martínez Sánchez (Spain) C Martínez Granados	4	6	2
LL	(Czech Republic) O Blahotová (Czech Republic) G Navrátilová	7	6
(Czech Republic) I Benešová (Czech Republic) R Voráčová	5	3
(Australia) B Stewart (Australia) S Stosur	7^{7}	2	4
4	(Australia) L McShea (Venezuela) M Sequera	6^{2}	6	6
(Romania) R Dragomir Ilie (Ukraine) T Perebiynis	2	4
2	(Switzerland) E Gagliardi (Austria) P Wartusch	6	6

Semifinals
1	(France) M Bartoli (France) É Loit	3	4
LL	(Czech Republic) O Blahotová (Czech Republic) G Navrátilová	6	6
4	(Australia) L McShea (Venezuela) M Sequera	2	6	6
2	(Switzerland) E Gagliardi (Austria) P Wartusch	6	1	4

Final
LL	(Czech Republic) O Blahotová (Czech Republic) G Navrátilová	6	6^{5}	4
4	(Australia) L McShea (Venezuela) M Sequera	2	7^{7}	6
