= 2005 Abierto Mexicano Telcel – Women's singles =

Women's singles
- 2005 Abierto Mexicano Telcel

Final
- Champion: (Italy) Flavia Pennetta
- Runner-up: (Slovakia) Ľudmila Cervanová
- Score: 3–6, 7–5, 6–3

Details
- Draw: 32 (2WC/4Q)
- Seeds: 8

Events
Singles	men	women
Doubles	men	women
← 2004 ·	Mexican Open	· 2006 →

Iveta Benešová was the defending champion, but did not compete this year.

Flavia Pennetta won the title by defeating Ľudmila Cervanová 3–6, 7–5, 6–3 in the final.

== Seeds ==
1. (Italy) Flavia Pennetta (champion)
2. (United States) Meghann Shaughnessy (second round)
3. (France) Émilie Loit (quarterfinals)
4. (Russia) Alina Jidkova (second round)
5. (Madagascar) Dally Randriantefy (semifinals)
6. (Spain) María Sánchez Lorenzo (first round)
7. (Poland) Marta Domachowska (second round)
8. (Spain) Nuria Llagostera Vives (first round)

== Draw ==
=== Key ===
- Q = Qualifier
- WC = Wild card
- LL = Lucky loser
- Alt = Alternate
- SE = Special exempt
- PR = Protected ranking
- ITF = ITF entry
- JE = Junior exempt
- w/o = Walkover
- r = Retired
- d = Defaulted
- SR = Special ranking

=== Finals ===
Semifinals
1	(Italy) Flavia Pennetta	6	6
(Italy) Antonella Serra Zanetti	2	1
5	(Madagascar) Dally Randriantefy	6	5	1
(Slovakia) Ľudmila Cervanová	2	7	6

Final
1	(Italy) Flavia Pennetta	3	7	6
(Slovakia) Ľudmila Cervanová	6	5	3

=== Top half ===
First round
1	(Italy) F Pennetta	7	6
(Germany) J Schruff	5	1
(Argentina) M Díaz Oliva	7^{7}	6
(Argentina) ME Salerni	6^{5}	3
(United States) L Lee-Waters	4	4
(United States) L Osterloh	6	6
WC	(Mexico) MJ López Herrera	2	2
7	(Poland) M Domachowska	6	6
4	(Russia) A Jidkova	6	6
Q	(Spain) RM Andrés Rodríguez	0	2
Q	(United States) J Ditty	1	6^{5}
(Colombia) C Castaño	6	7^{7}
(France) C Pin	2	1
(Switzerland) E Gagliardi	6	6
(Italy) An Serra Zanetti	6	6
8	(Spain) N Llagostera Vives	2	1

Second round
1	(Italy) F Pennetta	6	6
(Argentina) M Díaz Oliva	3	2
(United States) L Osterloh	7	6
7	(Poland) M Domachowska	5	4
4	(Russia) A Jidkova	6	4	2
(Colombia) C Castaño	2	6	6
(Switzerland) E Gagliardi	6^{4}	5
(Italy) An Serra Zanetti	7^{7}	7

Quarterfinals
1	(Italy) F Pennetta	3	6	6
(United States) L Osterloh	6	0	1
(Colombia) C Castaño	6^{4}	4
(Italy) An Serra Zanetti	7^{7}	6

Semifinals
1	(Italy) F Pennetta	6	6
(Italy) An Serra Zanetti	2	1

=== Bottom half ===
First round
5	(Madagascar) D Randriantefy	6	6
(United States) A Haynes	2	2
(Slovakia) Ľ Kurhajcová	5	3
(Ukraine) T Perebiynis	7	6
(France) S Beltrame	5	6	6
Q	(Hungary) Á Szávay	7	4	3
(Hungary) M Czink	4	0
3	(France) É Loit	6	6
6	(Spain) M Sánchez Lorenzo	3	5
(Slovakia) Ľ Cervanová	6	7
(Slovenia) T Pisnik	1	2
(United States) M Irvin	6	6
Q	(Argentina) E Krauth	3	7^{9}	6^{7}
(Spain) A Parra Santonja	6	6^{7}	7^{9}
WC	(Mexico) M Torres Sandoval	3	5
2	(United States) M Shaughnessy	6	7

Second round
5	(Madagascar) D Randriantefy	6	6
(Ukraine) T Perebiynis	3	2
(France) S Beltrame	6^{6}	5
3	(France) É Loit	7^{8}	7
(Slovakia) Ľ Cervanová	6	6
(United States) M Irvin	1	1
(Spain) A Parra Santonja	6	6^{6}	6
2	(United States) M Shaughnessy	4	7^{8}	3

Quarterfinals
5	(Madagascar) D Randriantefy	6	6
3	(France) É Loit	3	3
(Slovakia) Ľ Cervanová	6	6
(Spain) A Parra Santonja	2	3

Semifinals
5	(Madagascar) D Randriantefy	6	5	1
(Slovakia) Ľ Cervanová	2	7	6

== Qualifying ==
=== Seeds ===
1. (Spain) Laura Pous Tió (second round)
2. (Puerto Rico) Vilmarie Castellvi (second round)
3. (Czech Republic) Kateřina Böhmová (qualifying competition)
4. (Spain) Conchita Martínez Granados (first round)
5. (Hungary) Zsófia Gubacsi (first round)
6. (Czech Republic) Eva Birnerová (qualifying competition)
7. (Spain) Paula García (second round)
8. (Russia) Lioudmila Skavronskaia (first round)

=== Qualifiers ===
1. (Hungary) Ágnes Szávay
2. (Spain) Rosa María Andrés Rodríguez
3. (Argentina) Erica Krauth
4. (United States) Julie Ditty

=== Qualifying draw ===
==== First qualifier ====
First round
1	(Spain) Laura Pous Tió	6	6
(Mexico) Erika Clarke	1	1
(Ukraine) Alexandra Kravets	5	1
(Hungary) Ágnes Szávay	7	6
(Czech Republic) Olga Blahotová	6	6
(Argentina) Vanina García Sokol	3	1
WC	(Austria) Nina Murn	2	0
6	(Czech Republic) Eva Birnerová	6	6

Second round
1	(Spain) Laura Pous Tió	2	6	2
(Hungary) Ágnes Szávay	6	3	6
(Czech Republic) Olga Blahotová	3	0
6	(Czech Republic) Eva Birnerová	6	6

Qualifying competition
(Hungary) Ágnes Szávay	7^{7}	6
6	(Czech Republic) Eva Birnerová	6^{5}	4

==== Second qualifier ====
First round
2	(Puerto Rico) Vilmarie Castellvi	6	6
(Mexico) Marcela Arroyo	0	2
WC	(Uruguay) Ana Lucía Migliarini de León	4	3
(Portugal) Frederica Piedade	6	6
(Mexico) Daniela Múñoz Gallegos	2	0
(Spain) Rosa María Andrés Rodríguez	6	6
(Spain) Núria Roig	6	3	6
5	(Hungary) Zsófia Gubacsi	2	6	4

Second round
2	(Puerto Rico) Vilmarie Castellvi	2	7	4
(Portugal) Frederica Piedade	6	5	6
(Spain) Rosa María Andrés Rodríguez	6	6
(Spain) Núria Roig	1	1

Qualifying competition
(Portugal) Frederica Piedade	1	5
(Spain) Rosa María Andrés Rodríguez	6	7

==== Third qualifier ====
First round
3	(Czech Republic) Kateřina Böhmová	6	6
(Argentina) Betina Jozami	4	1
WC	(Mexico) Lorena Arias	0	3
(United States) Kaysie Smashey	6	6
(Germany) Jasmin Wöhr	2	0^{r}
(Argentina) Erica Krauth	6	4
WC	(Mexico) Valeria Pulido	1	0
7	(Spain) Paula García	6	6

Second round
3	(Czech Republic) Kateřina Böhmová	6	6
(United States) Kaysie Smashey	0	3
(Argentina) Erica Krauth	3	7	6
7	(Spain) Paula García	6	5	4

Qualifying competition
3	(Czech Republic) Kateřina Böhmová	4	2
(Argentina) Erica Krauth	6	6

==== Fourth qualifier ====
First round
4	(Spain) Conchita Martínez Granados	4	5
(Romania) Ruxandra Dragomir Ilie	6	7
(United States) Neha Uberoi	6	7^{7}
(Romania) Edina Gallovits	4	6^{5}
(France) Mathilde Johansson	6	6
(United States) Kristen Schlukebir	2	4
(United States) Julie Ditty	2	6	6
8	(Russia) Lioudmila Skavronskaia	6	2	3

Second round
(Romania) Ruxandra Dragomir Ilie	6^{7}	6	3
(United States) Neha Uberoi	7^{9}	3	6
(France) Mathilde Johansson	4	6	2
(United States) Julie Ditty	6	2	6

Qualifying competition
(United States) Neha Uberoi	3	3
(United States) Julie Ditty	6	6
