= 2005 Abierto Mexicano Telcel – Men's doubles =

Men's doubles
- 2005 Abierto Mexicano Telcel

Final
- Champions: (Spain) David Ferrer (Spain) Santiago Ventura
- Runners-up: (Czech Republic) Jiří Vaněk (Czech Republic) Tomáš Zíb
- Score: 4–6, 6–1, 6–4

Events
| Singles | men | women |
| Doubles | men | women |
| ← 2004 · | Mexican Open | · 2006 → |

Bob Bryan and Mike Bryan were the defending champions, but they competed in Scottsdale this week.

David Ferrer and Santiago Ventura won the title by defeating Jiří Vaněk and Tomáš Zíb 4–6, 6–1, 6–4 in the final.

== Seeds ==
1. (Argentina) Gastón Etlis / (Argentina) Martín Rodríguez (quarterfinals)
2. (Argentina) Lucas Arnold Ker / (Argentina) Mariano Hood (first round)
3. (Czech Republic) Jiří Novák / (Czech Republic) David Rikl (quarterfinals)
4. (Argentina) Martín García / (Argentina) Sebastián Prieto (first round)

== Draw ==
=== Key ===
- Q = Qualifier
- WC = Wild card
- LL = Lucky loser
- Alt = Alternate
- ITF = ITF entry
- PR = Protected ranking
- SR = Special ranking
- SE = Special exempt
- JE = Junior exempt
- JR = Junior Accelerator Programme entrant
- CO = College Accelerator Programme entrant
- NG = Next Gen Accelerator Program entrant
- w/o = Walkover
- r = Retired
- d = Defaulted

=== Draw ===
First round
1 | (Argentina) G Etlis (Argentina) M Rodríguez | 7^{7} | 6
WC | (Mexico) S González (Mexico) A Hernández | 6^{5} | 1
(Italy) E Artoni (Argentina) I González King | 1 | 2
(Spain) D Ferrer (Spain) S Ventura | 6 | 6
3 | (Czech Republic) J Novák (Czech Republic) D Rikl | 6 | 6
(Spain) Ó Hernández (Italy) F Volandri | 3 | 3
(Poland) M Fyrstenberg (Poland) M Matkowski | 5 | 6 | 4
(Spain) Á López Morón (Netherlands) R Wassen | 7 | 3 | 6
(Argentina) J Mónaco (Argentina) M Zabaleta
(Czech Republic) J Vaněk (Czech Republic) T Zíb | w/o
(Argentina) A Calleri (Argentina) JI Chela | 6 | 6
4 | (Argentina) M García (Argentina) S Prieto | 4 | 2
WC | (Mexico) B Echagaray (Mexico) M Gallardo Valles | 4 | 3
(Spain) Á Calatrava (Brazil) R Mello | 6 | 6
(Argentina) J Acasuso (Argentina) M Puerta | 6 | 6
2 | (Argentina) L Arnold Ker (Argentina) M Hood | 3 | 4

Quarterfinals
1 | (Argentina) G Etlis (Argentina) M Rodríguez | 1 | 4
(Spain) D Ferrer (Spain) S Ventura | 6 | 6
3 | (Czech Republic) J Novák (Czech Republic) D Rikl | 6 | 4 | 6^{5}
(Spain) Á López Morón (Netherlands) R Wassen | 1 | 6 | 7^{7}
(Czech Republic) J Vaněk (Czech Republic) T Zíb | 3 | 6 | 6
(Argentina) A Calleri (Argentina) JI Chela | 6 | 1 | 2
(Spain) Á Calatrava (Brazil) R Mello | 6 | 6
(Argentina) J Acasuso (Argentina) M Puerta | 0 | 2

Semifinals
(Spain) D Ferrer (Spain) S Ventura | 6 | 6
(Spain) Á López Morón (Netherlands) R Wassen | 4 | 2
(Czech Republic) J Vaněk (Czech Republic) T Zíb | 7^{7} | 6
(Spain) Á Calatrava (Brazil) R Mello | 6^{5} | 3

Final
(Spain) D Ferrer (Spain) S Ventura | 4 | 6 | 6
(Czech Republic) J Vaněk (Czech Republic) T Zíb | 6 | 1 | 4
