= 2011 BRD Năstase Țiriac Trophy – Singles =

Singles
- 2011 BRD Năstase Țiriac Trophy

Final
- Champion: (Germany) Florian Mayer
- Runner-up: (Spain) Pablo Andújar
- Score: 6–3, 6–1

Details
- Draw: 28
- Seeds: 8

Events
Singles	Doubles
← 2010 ·	BRD Năstase Țiriac Trophy	· 2012 →

Juan Ignacio Chela was the defending champion but was eliminated in the semifinals by Pablo Andújar.
Florian Mayer won the title, defeating Pablo Andújar 6–3, 6–1 in the final.

== Seeds ==
The top four seeds received a bye into the second round.

1. (Argentina) Juan Ignacio Chela (semifinals)
2. (Germany) Florian Mayer (champion)
3. (Spain) Marcel Granollers (second round)
4. (Spain) Pablo Andújar (final)
5. (Spain) Tommy Robredo (first round)
6. (Italy) Potito Starace (first round, retired)
7. (Italy) Andreas Seppi (quarterfinals)
8. (Spain) Albert Montañés (first round)

== Draw ==
=== Key ===
- Q = Qualifier
- WC = Wild card
- LL = Lucky loser
- Alt = Alternate
- SE = Special exempt
- PR = Protected ranking
- ITF = ITF entry
- JE = Junior exempt
- w/o = Walkover
- r = Retired
- d = Defaulted
- SR = Special ranking

=== Finals ===
Semifinals
1	(Argentina) Juan Ignacio Chela	4	5
4	(Spain) Pablo Andújar	6	7
(Italy) Filippo Volandri	6^{3}	2
2	(Germany) Florian Mayer	7^{7}	6

Final
4	(Spain) Pablo Andújar	3	1
2	(Germany) Florian Mayer	6	6

=== Top half ===
First round
Q	(France) F Serra	6	6
Q	(Italy) G Naso	2	4
(Russia) I Andreev	5	6	7
Q	(Germany) P Torebko	7	4	5
(France) É Prodon	1	6	1
7	(Italy) A Seppi	6	4	6
WC	(Romania) M Copil	6	6
WC	(Romania) V Crivoi	3	3
(Portugal) F Gil	2	6	6
(France) J Chardy	6	4	3
Q	(Italy) A Giannessi	7	6
8	(Spain) A Montañés	5	4

Second round
1	(Argentina) JI Chela	6	6
Q	(France) F Serra	1	0
(Russia) I Andreev	2	6	1
7	(Italy) A Seppi	6	3	6
4	(Spain) P Andújar	6	6
WC	(Romania) M Copil	2	3
(Portugal) F Gil	6^{2}	6	3
Q	(Italy) A Giannessi	7^{7}	0	6

Quarterfinals
1	(Argentina) JI Chela	7	6
7	(Italy) A Seppi	5	3
4	(Spain) P Andújar	6	6
Q	(Italy) A Giannessi	3	4

Semifinals
1	(Argentina) JI Chela	4	5
4	(Spain) P Andújar	6	7

=== Bottom half ===
First round
5	(Spain) T Robredo	4	6^{5}
(Brazil) J Souza	6	7^{7}
WC	(Romania) A Ungur	6	6
(Czech Republic) L Rosol	4	1
(Portugal) R Machado	3	3
(Italy) F Volandri	6	6
6	(Italy) P Starace	1	2	r
(Spain) P Riba	6	3
(Romania) V Hănescu	4	3
(Spain) A Ramos	6	6
(Argentina) C Berlocq	6	6
(Austria) A Haider-Maurer	2	1

Second round
(Brazil) J Souza	4	7^{8}	6
WC	(Romania) A Ungur	6	6^{6}	1
(Italy) F Volandri	6	6
3	(Spain) M Granollers	1	3
(Spain) P Riba	6	4	5
(Spain) A Ramos	2	6	7
(Argentina) C Berlocq	2	6	4
2	(Germany) F Mayer	6	0	6

Quarterfinals
(Brazil) J Souza	2	0
(Italy) F Volandri	6	6
(Spain) A Ramos	1	2
2	(Germany) F Mayer	6	6

Semifinals
(Italy) F Volandri	6^{3}	2
2	(Germany) F Mayer	7^{7}	6

== Qualifying draw ==
=== Seeds ===
1. (Netherlands) Thomas Schoorel (qualifying competition)
2. (France) Florent Serra (qualified)
3. (Russia) Evgeny Donskoy (qualifying competition)
4. (Italy) Alessandro Giannessi (qualified)
5. (Italy) Gianluca Naso (qualified)
6. (France) Jonathan Eysseric (second round)
7. (Germany) Peter Torebko (qualified)
8. (France) Olivier Patience (qualifying competition)

=== Qualifiers ===
1. (Italy) Gianluca Naso
2. (France) Florent Serra
3. (Germany) Peter Torebko
4. (Italy) Alessandro Giannessi

=== First qualifier ===
First round
1	(Netherlands) Thomas Schoorel	7^{7}	3	6
(Czech Republic) František Čermák	6^{4}	6	3
(Romania) Patrick Grigoriu	3	7	6^{6}
WC	(Romania) Luca George Tatomir	6	5	7^{8}
(Romania) Victor Ioniță	7^{7}	1	6^{4}
(Moldova) Andrei Ciumac	6^{2}	6	7^{7}
(Romania) Darius Florin Brăguși	3	2
5	(Italy) Gianluca Naso	6	6

Second round
1	(Netherlands) Thomas Schoorel	6	6
WC	(Romania) Luca George Tatomir	3	1
(Moldova) Andrei Ciumac	2	3
5	(Italy) Gianluca Naso	6	6

Qualifying competition
1	(Netherlands) Thomas Schoorel	6^{4}	4
5	(Italy) Gianluca Naso	7^{7}	6

=== Second qualifier ===
First round
2	(France) Florent Serra	6	6
(Romania) Laurențiu-Ady Gavrilă	0	2
WC	(Romania) Adrian-Marin Dăncescu	6	0	3
(Romania) Adrian Cruciat	3	6	6
(Romania) Teodor Nicolae Marin	6	3	5
(Romania) Răzvan Sabău	4	6	7
WC	(Romania) Andrei Cociașu	3	2
6	(France) Jonathan Eysseric	6	6

Second round
2	(France) Florent Serra	6	7
(Romania) Adrian Cruciat	3	5
(Romania) Răzvan Sabău	6^{5}	6	6
6	(France) Jonathan Eysseric	7^{7}	3	4

Qualifying competition
2	(France) Florent Serra	6	7^{7}
(Romania) Răzvan Sabău	1	6^{3}

=== Third qualifier ===
First round
3	(Russia) Evgeny Donskoy	6	6
WC	(Romania) Mihai Bădescu	0	0
(Romania) Petru-Alexandru Luncanu	6	4	2
(Romania) Robert Coman	4	6	6
(Romania) Victor Anagnastopol	1	3
(Romania) Teodor-Dacian Crăciun	6	6
WC	(Romania) Ciprian Alexandru Porumb	4	2
7	(Germany) Peter Torebko	6	6

Second round
3	(Russia) Evgeny Donskoy	4	6	6
(Romania) Robert Coman	6	1	0
(Romania) Teodor-Dacian Crăciun	1	6	4
7	(Germany) Peter Torebko	6	2	6

Qualifying competition
3	(Russia) Evgeny Donskoy	6	3	3
7	(Germany) Peter Torebko	4	6	6

=== Fourth qualifier ===
First round
4	(Italy) Alessandro Giannessi	7^{7}	6
(Romania) Alexandru Cătălin Marasin	6^{4}	1
WC	(Romania) Daniel Damian	4	2
(Romania) Alexandru-Daniel Carpen	6	6
(Romania) Andrei Săvulescu	6	6
WC	(Romania) Cătălin-Petre Nedelescu	3	1
WC	(Romania) Tudor Sulea	3	2
8	(France) Olivier Patience	6	6

Second round
4	(Italy) Alessandro Giannessi	6^{5}	6	6
(Romania) Alexandru-Daniel Carpen	7^{7}	1	1
(Romania) Andrei Săvulescu	1	1
8	(France) Olivier Patience	6	6

Qualifying competition
4	(Italy) Alessandro Giannessi	6	6
8	(France) Olivier Patience	3	4
