= 2011 BRD Năstase Țiriac Trophy =

- Date: 17–23 September
- Edition: 19th
- Category: 250 series
- Draw: 32S / 16D
- Surface: Clay / outdoor
- Location: Bucharest, Romania
- Venue: Arenele BNR

Champions

Singles
- (Germany) Florian Mayer

Doubles
- (Italy) Daniele Bracciali / (Italy) Potito Starace
← 2010 ·	BRD Năstase Țiriac Trophy	· 2012 →

The 2011 BRD Năstase Țiriac Trophy was a tennis tournament played on outdoor clay courts. It was the 19th edition of the BRD Năstase Țiriac Trophy tournament, and was part of the ATP World Tour 250 Series of the 2011 ATP World Tour. It was held in Bucharest, Romania, 17–23 September 2011.

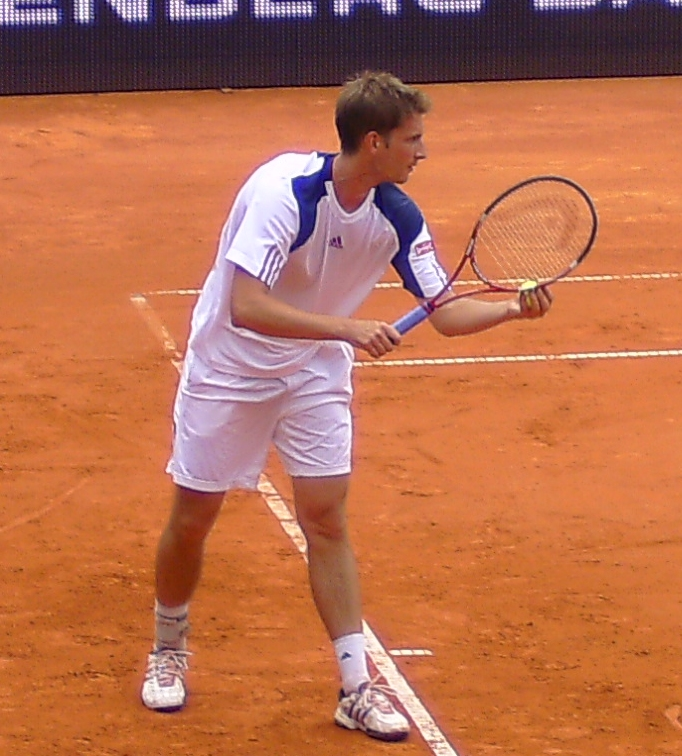
German Florian Mayer won his first ATP singles title defeating Spaniard Pablo Andújar in the final.

== Entrants ==
=== Seeds ===
Country	Player	Rank^{1}	Seed
ARG	Juan Ignacio Chela	23	1
GER	Florian Mayer	24	2
ESP	Marcel Granollers	30	3
ESP	Pablo Andújar	43	4
ESP	Tommy Robredo	44	5
ITA	Potito Starace	50	6
ITA	Andreas Seppi	51	7
ESP	Albert Montañés	54	8

- ^{1} Rankings are as of 12 September 2011.

=== Other entrants ===
The following players received wildcards into the singles main draw:

- (Romania) Marius Copil
- (Romania) Victor Crivoi
- (Romania) Adrian Ungur

The following players received entry from the qualifying draw:

- (Italy) Alessandro Giannessi
- (Italy) Gianluca Naso
- (France) Florent Serra
- (Germany) Peter Torebko

== Finals ==
=== Singles ===
(Germany) Florian Mayer defeated (Spain) Pablo Andújar, 6–3, 6–1

- It was Mayer's 1st career title.

=== Doubles ===
(Italy) Daniele Bracciali / (Italy) Potito Starace defeated (Austria) Julian Knowle / (Spain) David Marrero, 3–6, 6–4, [10–8].
