= 2011 BRD Năstase Țiriac Trophy – Doubles =

Doubles
- 2011 BRD Năstase Țiriac Trophy

Final
- Champions: (Italy) Daniele Bracciali (Italy) Potito Starace
- Runners-up: (Austria) Julian Knowle (Spain) David Marrero
- Score: 3–6, 6–4, [10–8]

Events
Singles	Doubles
← 2010 ·	BRD Năstase Țiriac Trophy	· 2012 →

Juan Ignacio Chela and Łukasz Kubot were the defending champions, but decided not to participate.
Daniele Bracciali and Potito Starace won the title, defeating Julian Knowle and David Marrero 3–6, 6–4, [10–8] in the final.

== Seeds ==
1. (Sweden) Robert Lindstedt / (Romania) Horia Tecău (quarterfinals)
2. (Czech Republic) František Čermák / (Slovakia) Filip Polášek (semifinals)
3. (Italy) Daniele Bracciali / (Italy) Potito Starace (champions)
4. (Austria) Julian Knowle / (Spain) David Marrero (final)

== Draw ==
=== Key ===
- Q = Qualifier
- WC = Wild card
- LL = Lucky loser
- Alt = Alternate
- SE = Special exempt
- PR = Protected ranking
- ITF = ITF entry
- JE = Junior exempt
- w/o = Walkover
- r = Retired
- d = Defaulted
- SR = Special ranking

=== Draw ===
First round
1	(Sweden) R Lindstedt (Romania) H Tecău	6^{8}	6	[10]
WC	(Romania) V Anagnastopol (Romania) F Mergea	7^{10}	4	[8]
(Australia) J Kerr (United States) T Parrott	6	6
(Italy) A Motti (India) P Raja	2	1
3	(Italy) D Bracciali (Italy) P Starace	6	6
WC	(Romania) V Crivoi (Romania) P-A Luncanu	2	2
(Spain) P Riba (Brazil) J Souza	6	6
(Germany) F Mayer (Netherlands) R Wassen	3	3
(Russia) E Donskoy (Spain) A Ramos	3	2
(Argentina) C Berlocq (Czech Republic) L Rosol	6	6
(Brazil) F Ferreiro (Portugal) R Machado	5	1
4	(Austria) J Knowle (Spain) D Marrero	7	6
(Romania) M Copil (Romania) V Hănescu	2	2
(Italy) A Seppi (Italy) F Volandri	6	6
(Germany) M Emmrich (Sweden) A Siljeström	6	6^{4}	[5]
2	(Czech Republic) F Čermák (Slovakia) F Polášek	2	7^{7}	[10]

Quarterfinals
1	(Sweden) R Lindstedt (Romania) H Tecău	6	2	[5]
(Australia) J Kerr (United States) T Parrott	3	6	[10]
3	(Italy) D Bracciali (Italy) P Starace	6	6
(Spain) P Riba (Brazil) J Souza	3	1
(Argentina) C Berlocq (Czech Republic) L Rosol	4	6^{3}
4	(Austria) J Knowle (Spain) D Marrero	6	7^{7}
(Italy) A Seppi (Italy) F Volandri	2	3
2	(Czech Republic) F Čermák (Slovakia) F Polášek	6	6

Semifinals
(Australia) J Kerr (United States) T Parrott	6^{3}	6	[4]
3	(Italy) D Bracciali (Italy) P Starace	7^{7}	3	[10]
4	(Austria) J Knowle (Spain) D Marrero	7^{7}	4	[10]
2	(Czech Republic) F Čermák (Slovakia) F Polášek	6^{2}	6	[8]

Final
3	(Italy) D Bracciali (Italy) P Starace	3	6	[10]
4	(Austria) J Knowle (Spain) D Marrero	6	4	[8]
