= 2006 Abierto Mexicano Telcel – Men's doubles =

Men's doubles
- 2006 Abierto Mexicano Telcel

Final
- Champions: (Czech Republic) František Čermák (Czech Republic) Leoš Friedl
- Runners-up: (Italy) Potito Starace (Italy) Filippo Volandri
- Score: 7–5, 6–2

Events
Singles	men	women
Doubles	men	women
← 2005 ·	Abierto Mexicano Telcel	· 2007 →

== Draw ==
First round
1	(Czech Republic) F Čermák (Czech Republic) L Friedl	7^{7}	6
(Argentina) JP Brzezicki (Argentina) JI Chela	6^{4}	1
(Greece) V Mazarakis (Serbia and Montenegro) B Pašanski	4	4
(Czech Republic) D Škoch (Czech Republic) J Vaněk	6	6
4	(Czech Republic) L Dlouhý (Czech Republic) P Vízner	4	6	[5]
(Czech Republic) T Cibulec (Czech Republic) I Minář	6	2	[10]
Alt.	(Ecuador) N Lapentti (Argentina) S Roitman	7^{8}	7^{7}
(Spain) A Martín (Spain) A Montañés	6^{6}	6^{3}
(Argentina) M García (Peru) L Horna	6	6
(Argentina) C Berlocq (United States) T Phillips	4	3
WC	(Brazil) M Daniel (Mexico) S González	2	3
3	(Poland) M Fyrstenberg (Poland) M Matkowski	6	6
WC	(Mexico) B Echagaray (Mexico) M Gallardo Valles	3	6^{2}
(France) F Serra (Spain) F Vicente	6	7^{7}
Alt.	(Italy) P Starace (Italy) F Volandri	5	6	[10]
2	(Argentina) D Junqueira (Costa Rica) JA Marín	7	2	[4]

Quarterfinals
1	(Czech Republic) F Čermák (Czech Republic) L Friedl	4	6	[10]
(Czech Republic) D Škoch (Czech Republic) J Vaněk	6	3	[4]
(Czech Republic) T Cibulec (Czech Republic) I Minář	6	6
(Ecuador) N Lapentti (Argentina) S Roitman	3	0
(Spain) M García (Peru) L Horna	6^{3}	1
3	(Poland) M Fyrstenberg (Poland) M Matkowski	7^{7}	6
(France) F Serra (Spain) F Vicente	6^{4}	3
(Italy) P Starace (Italy) F Volandri	7^{7}	6

Semifinals
1	(Czech Republic) F Čermák (Czech Republic) L Friedl	6	6
(Czech Republic) T Cibulec (Czech Republic) I Minář	2	2
3	(Poland) M Fyrstenberg (Poland) M Matkowski	2	6	[10]
(Italy) P Starace (Italy) F Volandri	6	3	[12]

Finals
1	(Czech Republic) F Čermák (Czech Republic) L Friedl	7	6
(Italy) P Starace (Italy) F Volandri	5	2
