= 2004 Abierto Mexicano de Tenis Telefonica Movistar =

- Date: March 1–7
- Edition: 11th (men) / 4th (women)
- Surface: Clay / outdoor
- Location: Acapulco, Mexico
- Venue: Fairmont Acapulco Princess

Champions

Men's singles
- (Spain) Carlos Moyá

Women's singles
- (Czech Republic) Iveta Benešová

Men's doubles
- (United States) Bob Bryan / (United States) Mike Bryan

Women's doubles
- (Australia) Lisa McShea / (Venezuela) Milagros Sequera
← 2003 ·	Mexican Open	· 2005 →

The 2004 Abierto Mexicano de Tenis Telefonica Movistar was a tennis tournament played on outdoor clay courts. It was the 11th edition of the men's tournament (4th for the women) of the event known that year as the Abierto Mexicano de Tenis Telefonica Movistar, and was part of the International Series Gold of the 2004 ATP Tour, and of the Tier III Series of the 2004 WTA Tour. Both the men's and the women's events took place at the Fairmont Acapulco Princess in Acapulco, Mexico, from March 1 through March 7, 2004.

== Finals ==
=== Men's singles ===
(Spain) Carlos Moyá defeated (Spain) Fernando Verdasco 6–3, 6–0

- It was Carlos Moyá's 2nd title of the year, and his 16th of his career. It was his 2nd win at the event.

=== Women's singles ===
(Czech Republic) Iveta Benešová defeated (Italy) Flavia Pennetta 7–6^{(7–5)}, 6–4

- It was Iveta Benešová's only title of the year and the 1st of her career.

=== Men's doubles ===
(United States) Bob Bryan / (United States) Mike Bryan defeated (Argentina) Juan Ignacio Chela / (Chile) Nicolás Massú 6–2, 6–3

- It was Bob Bryan's 3rd title of the year and the 17th of his career. It was Mike Bryan's 3rd title of the year and the 19th of his career.

=== Women's doubles ===
(Australia) Lisa McShea / (Venezuela) Milagros Sequera defeated (Czech Republic) Olga Blahotová / (Czech Republic) Gabriela Navrátilová 2–6, 7–6^{(7–5)}, 6–4

- It was McShea's 1st title of the year and the 2nd of her career. It was Sequera's 1st title of the year and the 1st of her career.
