= 2004 Abierto Mexicano de Tenis Telefonica Movistar – Women's singles =

Women's singles
- 2004 Abierto Mexicano de Tenis Telefonica Movistar

Final
- Champion: (Czech Republic) Iveta Benešová
- Runner-up: (Italy) Flavia Pennetta
- Score: 7–6^{(7–5)}, 6–4

Events
Singles	men	women
Doubles	men	women
- Mexican Open

Amanda Coetzer was the defending champion, but lost in second round to Marta Marrero.

Qualifier Iveta Benešová won her first WTA Tour singles title by defeating Flavia Pennetta 7–6^{(7–5)}, 6–4 in the final.

== Seeds ==
The first two seeds received a bye into the second round.

1. (South Africa) Amanda Coetzer (second round)
2. (Japan) Shinobu Asagoe (second round)
3. (Spain) María Sánchez Lorenzo (semifinals)
4. (France) Émilie Loit (quarterfinals)
5. (France) Marion Bartoli (second round)
6. (Switzerland) Emmanuelle Gagliardi (first round)
7. (Spain) Arantxa Parra Santonja (second round)
8. (Slovakia) Ľudmila Cervanová (first round)

== Draw ==
Key

- Q = Qualifier
- WC = Wild card
- LL = Lucky loser
- Alt = Alternate
- ITF = ITF entry
- PR = Protected ranking
- SR = Special ranking
- SE = Special exempt
- JE = Junior exempt
- JR = Junior Accelerator Programme entrant
- CO = College Accelerator Programme entrant
- NG = Next Gen Accelerator Program entrant
- w/o = Walkover
- r = Retired
- d = Defaulted

=== Finals ===
Semifinals
(Spain) Marta Marrero	1	6	3
Q	(Czech Republic) Iveta Benešová	6	4	6
3	(Spain) María Sánchez Lorenzo	2	3
(Italy) Flavia Pennetta	6	6

Final
Q	(Czech Republic) Iveta Benešová	7^{7}	6
(Italy) Flavia Pennetta	6^{5}	4

=== Top half ===
First round
(Spain) M Marrero	6	7^{7}
(Spain) G León García	3	6^{3}
(Venezuela) M Sequera	1	4
Q	(Australia) S Stosur	6	6
LL	(Germany) J Schruff	6	6
6	(Switzerland) E Gagliardi	2	2
4	(France) É Loit	6^{3}	6	6
WC	(Luxembourg) A Kremer	7^{7}	4	1
(Ukraine) T Perebiynis	4	2
Q	(United States) M Washington	6	6
Q	(Germany) A Roesch	4	0
Q	(Czech Republic) I Benešová	6	6
(Italy) R Grande	3	1
5	(France) M Bartoli	6	6

Second round
1	(South Africa) A Coetzer	5	3
(Spain) M Marrero	7	6
Q	(Australia) S Stosur	6	6
LL	(Germany) J Schruff	4	2
4	(France) É Loit	6	6
Q	(United States) M Washington	4	4
Q	(Czech Republic) I Benešová	6	6
5	(France) M Bartoli	3	1

Quarterfinals
(Spain) M Marrero	6	6
Q	(Australia) S Stosur	4	3
4	(France) É Loit	6^{4}	1
Q	(Czech Republic) I Benešová	7^{7}	6

Semifinals
(Spain) M Marrero	1	6	3
Q	(Czech Republic) I Benešová	6	4	6

=== Bottom half ===
First round
8	(Slovakia) Ľ Cervanová	3	7^{8}	2
(Italy) T Garbin	6	6^{6}	6
(Ukraine) J Vakulenko	6	6
WC	(Mexico) J Fernández	3	2
(Hungary) M Czink	5	7	3
PR	(Argentina) M Díaz Oliva	7	5	6
(Czech Republic) K Koukalová	5	3
3	(Spain) M Sánchez Lorenzo	7	6
7	(Spain) A Parra Santonja	6	6
(Russia) A Jidkova	4	4
(Italy) F Pennetta	4	6	6
(United States) S Reeves	6	4	3
(Slovakia) Ľ Kurhajcová	6^{2}	0^{r}
(Czech Republic) N Vaidišová	6^{5}	0

Second round
(Italy) T Garbin	3	6^{2}
(Ukraine) J Vakulenko	6	7^{7}
PR	(Argentina) M Díaz Oliva	3	3
3	(Spain) M Sánchez Lorenzo	6	6
7	(Spain) A Parra Santonja	4	1
(Italy) F Pennetta	6	6
(Czech Republic) N Vaidišová	6	6
2	(Japan) S Asagoe	2	3

Quarterfinals
(Ukraine) J Vakulenko	7^{7}	4	1
3	(Spain) M Sánchez Lorenzo	6^{5}	6	6
(Italy) F Pennetta	6	6
(Czech Republic) N Vaidišová	4	3

Semifinals
3	(Spain) M Sánchez Lorenzo	2	3
(Italy) F Pennetta	6	6
