= 2006 Abierto Mexicano Telcel =

- Date: February 27 – March 6
- Edition: 13th (men) / 6th (women)
- Surface: Clay / outdoor
- Location: Acapulco, Mexico

Champions

Men's singles
- (Peru) Luis Horna

Women's singles
- (Germany) Anna-Lena Grönefeld

Men's doubles
- (Czech Republic) František Čermák / (Czech Republic) Leoš Friedl

Women's doubles
- (Germany) Anna-Lena Grönefeld / (United States) Meghann Shaughnessy
← 2005 ·	Mexican Open	· 2007 →

The 2006 Abierto Mexicano Telcel was both a men's and women's tennis tournament on the 2006 ATP and WTA Tours that was played on outdoor clay courts and was held in Acapulco, Mexico. The tournament was held on February 27, 2006, and ended on March 6, 2006.

== Finals ==
=== Men's singles ===
(Peru) Luis Horna defeated (Argentina) Juan Ignacio Chela, 7–6^{(7–5)}, 6–4

=== Women's singles ===
(Germany) Anna-Lena Grönefeld defeated (Italy) Flavia Pennetta, 6–1, 4–6, 6–2

=== Men's doubles ===
(Czech Republic) František Čermák / (Czech Republic) Leoš Friedl defeated (Italy) Potito Starace / (Italy) Filippo Volandri, 7–5, 6–2

=== Women's doubles ===
(Germany) Anna-Lena Grönefeld / (United States) Meghann Shaughnessy defeated (Japan) Shinobu Asagoe / (France) Émilie Loit, 6–1, 6–3
