= 2010 BCR Open Romania – Doubles =

Doubles
- 2010 BCR Open Romania

Final
- Champions: (Argentina) Juan Ignacio Chela (Poland) Łukasz Kubot
- Runners-up: (Spain) Marcel Granollers (Spain) Santiago Ventura
- Score: 6–2, 5–7, [13–11]

Events
Singles	Doubles
← 2009 ·	BCR Open Romania	· 2011 →

František Čermák and Michal Mertiňák were the defending champions, but they decided to not compete this year.

== Seeds ==
1. (Austria) Julian Knowle / (Romania) Horia Tecău (first round)
2. (Spain) Marcel Granollers / (Spain) Santiago Ventura (finals)
3. (Argentina) Juan Ignacio Chela / (Poland) Łukasz Kubot (champions)
4. (Uruguay) Pablo Cuevas / (Spain) David Marrero (semifinals)

== Draw ==
=== Key ===
- Q = Qualifier
- WC = Wild card
- LL = Lucky loser
- Alt = Alternate
- SE = Special exempt
- PR = Protected ranking
- ITF = ITF entry
- JE = Junior exempt
- w/o = Walkover
- r = Retired
- d = Defaulted
- SR = Special ranking

=== Draw ===
First round
1	(Austria) J Knowle (Romania) H Tecău	3	2
(Germany) P Marx (Slovakia) I Zelenay	6	6
(Spain) D Gimeno-Traver (Spain) P Riba	6^{6}	0
(Czech Republic) L Friedl (Slovakia) F Polášek	7^{8}	6
3	(Argentina) JI Chela (Poland) Ł Kubot	6	7
(Poland) T Bednarek (Poland) M Przysiężny	3	5
(Italy) F Fognini (Spain) A Montañés	2	1
(Italy) D Bracciali (Italy) P Starace	6	6
(Italy) A Seppi (Italy) S Vagnozzi	4	4
(Mexico) S González (United States) T Rettenmaier	6	6
(Argentina) C Berlocq (Argentina) M González	3	3
4	(Uruguay) P Cuevas (Spain) D Marrero	6	6
WC	(Romania) V Crivoi (Romania) A Ungur	3	2
WC	(Romania) V Anagnastopol (Romania) M Copil	6	6
(Netherlands) R Haase (Germany) F Mayer	6	2	[5]
2	(Spain) M Granollers (Spain) S Ventura	1	6	[10]

Quarterfinals
(Germany) P Marx (Slovakia) I Zelenay	6	3	[10]
(Czech Republic) L Friedl (Slovakia) F Polášek	4	6	[6]
3	(Argentina) JI Chela (Poland) Ł Kubot	7^{7}	6
(Italy) D Bracciali (Italy) P Starace	6^{4}	1
(Mexico) S González (United States) T Rettenmaier	3	2
4	(Uruguay) P Cuevas (Spain) D Marrero	6	6
WC	(Romania) V Anagnastopol (Romania) M Copil	1	6^{5}
2	(Spain) M Granollers (Spain) S Ventura	6	7^{7}

Semifinals
(Germany) P Marx (Slovakia) I Zelenay	0	6^{5}
3	(Argentina) JI Chela (Poland) Ł Kubot	6	7^{7}
4	(Uruguay) P Cuevas (Spain) D Marrero	3	2
2	(Spain) M Granollers (Spain) S Ventura	6	6

Finals
3	(Argentina) JI Chela (Poland) Ł Kubot	6	5	[13]
2	(Spain) M Granollers (Spain) S Ventura	2	7	[11]
