= 2006 Abierto Mexicano Telcel – Men's singles =

Men's singles
- 2006 Abierto Mexicano Telcel

Final
- Champion: (Peru) Luis Horna
- Runner-up: (Argentina) Juan Ignacio Chela
- Score: 7–6^{(7–5)}, 6–4

Details
- Draw: 32
- Seeds: 8

Events
Singles	men	women
Doubles	men	women
- Abierto Mexicano Telcel

Rafael Nadal was the defending champion, but did not participate this year.

Luis Horna won the title, defeating Juan Ignacio Chela 7–6^{(7–5)}, 6–4 in the final.

== Seeds ==
1. (Argentina) Guillermo Coria (first round)
2. (Argentina) Gastón Gaudio (semifinals)
3. (Spain) Carlos Moyá (second round)
4. (Italy) Filippo Volandri (first round)
5. (Argentina) José Acasuso (second round, retired because of a right foot injury)
6. (France) Florent Serra (first round)
7. (Argentina) Juan Ignacio Chela (final)
8. (Chile) Nicolás Massú (second round)

== Draw ==
Key

- Q = Qualifier
- WC = Wild card
- LL = Lucky loser
- Alt = Alternate
- ITF = ITF entry
- PR = Protected ranking
- SR = Special ranking
- SE = Special exempt
- JE = Junior exempt
- JR = Junior Accelerator Programme entrant
- CO = College Accelerator Programme entrant
- NG = Next Gen Accelerator Program entrant
- w/o = Walkover
- r = Retired
- d = Defaulted

=== Finals ===
Semifinals
7	(Argentina) Juan Ignacio Chela	6	6
Q	(Spain) Nicolás Almagro	2	2
(Peru) Luis Horna	4	6	6
2	(Argentina) Gastón Gaudio	6	4	3

Final
7	(Argentina) Juan Ignacio Chela	6^{5}	4
(Peru) Luis Horna	7^{7}	6

=== Section 1 ===
First round
1	(Argentina) G Coria	2	4
Q	(Italy) A di Mauro	6	6
(Serbia) B Pašanski	2	6	7
(Czech Republic) I Minář	6	3	5
(Germany) T Behrend	7^{7}	5	6
(Czech Republic) J Vanēk	6^{4}	7	3
(Argentina) J Mónaco	6	6^{4}	0^{r}
7	(Argentina) JI Chela	4	7^{7}	3
3	(Spain) C Moyà	3	6	7
WC	(Mexico) M Gallardo Valles	6	4	5
(Spain) A Montañés	6	5
WC	(Argentina) JM del Potro	2	3^{r}
Q	(Spain) N Almagro	6	4	6
(Spain) F Vicente	3	6	4
WC	(Mexico) S González	2	1
5	(Argentina) J Acasuso	6	6

Second round
Q	(Italy) A di Mauro	1	6	6
(Serbia) B Pašanski	6	3	4
(Germany) T Behrend	1	6	2
7	(Argentina) JI Chela	6	2	6
3	(Spain) C Moyà	6	6^{5}	4
(Spain) A Montañés	2	7^{7}	6
Q	(Spain) N Almagro	6	0
5	(Argentina) J Acasuso	3	0^{r}

Quarterfinals
Q	(Italy) A di Mauro	5	2
7	(Argentina) JI Chela	7	6
(Spain) A Montañés	4	0
Q	(Spain) N Almagro	6	6

Semifinals
7	(Argentina) JI Chela	6	6
Q	(Spain) N Almagro	2	2

=== Section 2 ===
First round
6	(France) F Serra	4	7^{7}	4
Q	(Costa Rica) JA Marín	6	6^{4}	6
(Peru) L Horna	6	6
(Czech Republic) L Dlouhý	4	4
(Argentina) A Calleri	6	6
(Ecuador) N Lapentti	3	3
(Spain) A Martín	6	2	6
4	(Italy) F Volandri	0	6	2
8	(Chile) N Massú	6	7
(Argentina) C Berlocq	2	5
(United States) K Kim	5	3
(Brazil) M Daniel	7	6
(Italy) P Starace	6	5	3
(Romania) R Sabău	0	7	6
Q	(Spain) A Portas	5	2
2	(Argentina) G Gaudio	7	6

Second round
Q	(Costa Rica) JA Marín	3	6^{4}
(Peru) L Horna	6	7^{7}
(Argentina) A Calleri	6	6
(Spain) A Martín	3	2
8	(Chile) N Massú	4	4
(Brazil) M Daniel	6	6
(Romania) R Sabău	3	6	2
2	(Argentina) G Gaudio	6	3	6

Quarterfinals
(Peru) L Horna	6	6
(Argentina) A Calleri	3	4
(Brazil) M Daniel	4	6	3
2	(Argentina) G Gaudio	6	2	6

Semifinals
(Peru) L Horna	4	6	6
2	(Argentina) G Gaudio	6	4	3
