= Tennis in Argentina =

Tennis in Argentina is regulated by the Asociación Argentina de Tenis (Argentine Tennis Association), which also selects the coaches of the Argentine teams for the Davis Cup and Federation Cup. There are many tennis courts in Argentina, and the sport, even though still considered middle- to upper-class, is practiced by regardless of age.

== History ==
Although British immigrants brought the sport to Argentina, it was not until late in the 1970s that Guillermo Vilas' success made the sport popular, reaching second place in the 1975 ATP ranking. He was internationally recognised and was later included in the International Tennis Hall of Fame. During the 1980s, José Luis Clerc (4th), Alberto Mancini (8th) and Martín Jaite (10th) followed Vilas and kept interest in the sport alive. Argentina won the 1980 World Team Cup beating Italy 3–0, and reached the final of the 1980 Davis Cup, losing to United States 3–1. In the 1990s it was Gabriela Sabatini who best represented Argentine tennis, becoming an international figure on and off the court.

The boom of Argentine tennis players came in the 2000s, when many players became important in the circuit reaching high ranks. Paola Suárez won eight Grand Slam doubles between 2001 and 2005 and was, together with Spaniard Virginia Ruano Pascual, the top women's couple for three years in a row. In 2002, José Acasuso, Guillermo Cañas, Lucas Arnold and Gastón Etlis won again the World Team Cup for Argentina, this time 3–0 against Russia. Five years later, Acasuso, Juan Ignacio Chela, Agustín Calleri and Sebastián Prieto won it again, this time 2–1 against the Czech Republic. David Nalbandian lost in the final of Wimbledon in 2002. The 2004 French Open saw an Argentine final between Gastón Gaudio and Guillermo Coria. The following year's French Open saw Mariano Puerta reach the final.

Another example of the importance of the Argentine presence on the circuit was the August 2005 male rankings that counted five Argentine players among the top 12 (from 8th to 12th) of the ATP ranking, and three in the top ten of the Champions Race (5th, 8th and 9th). The 2005 Tennis Masters Cup, due to a series of last-minute resignations, had 4 Argentine players of the total of 8, with Gaudio reaching semi-finals, and Nalbandian winning the competition against #1 Roger Federer.

In 2009 Juan Martín del Potro became the first Argentinian to win the US Open since Guillermo Vilas did in 1977. Del Potro defeated world number 2 Rafael Nadal in straight sets in semifinals to reach the final and eventually beat world number 1 Roger Federer in five sets. That year Del Potro reached the final of the ATP World Tour Championship. In 2016, the Argentine Copa Davis team were crowned world champions. Juan Martín del Potro, Federico Delbonis, Leonardo Mayer and Guido Pella earned the country their first title in the sport's most important inter-country competition.

== Highest-ranked players ==
=== Singles ===
==== Men ====
#	Player	Highest rank		ATP Tour		ATP		Ref.
#	Player	No.	Date	First	Last	Titles	Wins	Ref.
1.	Guillermo Vilas	2	Apr 1975	1969	1992	62	951	
2.	Juan Martín del Potro	3	Aug 2018	2005	2019	22	439	
3.	David Nalbandian	3	Mar 2006	2000	2013	11	383	
4.	Guillermo Coria	3	May 2004	2000	2009	9	218	
5.	José Luis Clerc	4	Aug 1981	1977	1995	25	378	
6.	Gastón Gaudio	5	Apr 2005	1996	2011	8	270	
7.	Guillermo Cañas	8	Jun 2005	1995	2010	7	252	
8.	Diego Schwartzman	8	Oct 2020	2010	2020	3	158	
9.	Alberto Mancini	8	Oct 1989	1987	1994	3	148	
10.	Mariano Puerta	9	Aug 2005	1998	2009	3	128	
11.	Martín Jaite	10	Jul 1990	1983	1993	12	301	
12.	Juan Mónaco	10	Jul 2012	2002	2017	9	342	

==== Women ====
#	Player	Highest rank		WTA Tour		WTA		Ref.
#	Player	No.	Date	First	Last	Titles	Wins	Ref.
1.	Gabriela Sabatini	3	Feb 1989	1985	1996	27	632	
2.	Paola Suárez	9	Jun 2004	1991	2012	4	371	

=== Doubles ===
==== Men ====
#	Player	Highest rank		ATP Tour		ATP		Ref.
#	Player	No.	Date	First	Last	Titles	Wins	Ref.
1.	Horacio Zeballos	1	May 2024	2003	2020	17	221	

==== Women ====
#	Player	Highest rank		WTA Tour		WTA		Ref.
#	Player	No.	Date	First	Last	Titles	Wins	Ref.
1.	Paola Suárez	1	Sep 2002	1991	2012	44	513	
2.	Gisela Dulko	1	Nov 2010	2001	2012	17	305	
3.	Gabriela Sabatini	3	Nov 1988	1985	1996	13	252	

== Best results at major tournaments ==
As of the 2020 French Open.

=== Singles ===
==== Men ====
Player	Australian Open	French Open	Wimbledon	US Open	ATP Finals	Other
Guillermo Vilas	Win (2)	Win	Quarterfinal	Win	Win	Won 2 Monte-Carlo Masters, 2 Washington Masters, a Hamburg Masters and a Rome Masters.
Juan Martín del Potro	Quarterfinal	Semifinal	Semifinal	Win	Final	Won an Indian Wells Masters, a Silver medal and a Bronze medal at the Olympics.
David Nalbandian	Semifinal	Semifinal	Final	Semifinal	Win	Won a Madrid Masters and a Paris Masters.
Gastón Gaudio	3rd round	Win	2nd round	3rd round	Semifinal	
Guillermo Coria	4th round	Final	4th round	Quarterfinal	Round robin	Won a Hamburg Masters and a Monte-Carlo Masters.
Mariano Puerta	2nd round	Final	1st round	2nd round	Round robin	
José Luis Clerc	2nd round	Semifinal	4th round	4th round	Quarterfinal	Won a Rome Masters.
Diego Schwartzman	4th round	Semifinal	3rd round	Quarterfinal	Round robin	
Guillermo Cañas	4th round	Quarterfinal	4th round	3rd round	Did not play	Won a Canada Masters.
Martín Jaite	3rd round	Quarterfinal	2nd round	3rd round	Quarterfinal	
Alberto Mancini	2nd round	Quarterfinal	Did not play	4th round	Did not play	Won a Monte-Carlo Masters and a Rome Masters.

== Most wins against top 10 players ==
#	Player	Wins	Loss	Notes
1.	Juan Martín del Potro	53	78	Second player with most wins against the "Big Three" (Note: "Big Three" refers to number-one players and multiple Grand Slam winners Roger Federer, Rafael Nadal and Novak Djokovic.) (17).
2.	Guillermo Vilas	51	82	
3.	David Nalbandian	35	60	Only player to defeat the "Big Three" in the same tournament.
4.	José Luis Clerc	24	45	
5.	Guillermo Cañas	20	30	
5.	Juan Mónaco	20	56	
7.	Juan Ignacio Chela	17	52	
8.	Mariano Zabaleta	16	27	
9.	Gastón Gaudio	12	33	
10.	Agustín Calleri	11	28	
10.	Martín Jaite	11	34	

== Team competitions ==
=== Finals ===
Competition	Titles		Runner-ups		Ref.
Davis Cup	1	2016	4	1981, 2006, 2008, 2011	
Hopman Cup	–		1	2005	
