= 2005 Abierto Mexicano Telcel – Men's singles =

Men's singles
- 2005 Abierto Mexicano Telcel

Final
- Champion: (Spain) Rafael Nadal
- Runner-up: (Spain) Albert Montañés
- Score: 6–1, 6–0

Details
- Draw: 32 (3WC/4Q)
- Seeds: 8

Events
Singles	men	women
Doubles	men	women
- Mexican Open

Carlos Moyá was the defending champion, but lost in the second round to Mariano Puerta.

Rafael Nadal won in the final 6–1, 6–0, against Albert Montañés.

== Seeds ==
1. (Spain) Carlos Moyá (second round)
2. (Argentina) Gastón Gaudio (first round, retired due to a pubalgia)
3. (Argentina) Guillermo Cañas (quarterfinals)
4. (Argentina) Juan Ignacio Chela (first round)
5. (Czech Republic) Jiří Novák (quarterfinals)
6. (Italy) Filippo Volandri (quarterfinals)
7. (Spain) David Ferrer (second round)
8. (Spain) Rafael Nadal (champion)

== Draw ==
Key

- Q = Qualifier
- WC = Wild card
- LL = Lucky loser
- Alt = Alternate
- ITF = ITF entry
- PR = Protected ranking
- SR = Special ranking
- SE = Special exempt
- JE = Junior exempt
- JR = Junior Accelerator Programme entrant
- CO = College Accelerator Programme entrant
- NG = Next Gen Accelerator Program entrant
- w/o = Walkover
- r = Retired
- d = Defaulted

=== Finals ===
Semifinals
WC	(Argentina) Mariano Puerta	4	1
8	(Spain) Rafael Nadal	6	6
(Argentina) Agustín Calleri	6^{3}	6	6^{4}
(Spain) Albert Montañés	7^{7}	1	7^{7}

Final
8	(Spain) Rafael Nadal	6	6
(Spain) Albert Montañés	1	0

=== Top half ===
First round
1	(Spain) C Moyá	6	7^{7}
Q	(Ecuador) N Lapentti	4	6^{4}
(Spain) G García-López	3	6^{3}
WC	(Argentina) M Puerta	6	7^{7}
WC	(Mexico) M Gallardo-Vallés	1	1
(Spain) F Mantilla	6	6
(Brazil) R Mello	6	3	2
7	(Spain) D Ferrer	4	6	6
3	(Argentina) G Cañas	6	2
Q	(Argentina) E Massa	4	2^{r}
Q	(France) N Devilder	6	6
(Argentina) J Acasuso	4	4
(Spain) S Ventura	2	6	6
(Spain) N Almagro	6	4	2
(Spain) Á Calatrava	4	4
8	(Spain) R Nadal	6	6

Second round
1	(Spain) C Moyá	6	3	4
WC	(Argentina) M Puerta	4	6	6
(Spain) F Mantilla	7	6
7	(Spain) D Ferrer	5	2
3	(Argentina) G Cañas	6	7
Q	(France) N Devilder	0	5
(Spain) S Ventura	6^{0}	2
8	(Spain) R Nadal	7^{7}	6

Quarterfinals
WC	(Argentina) M Puerta	6	3	7^{7}
(Spain) F Mantilla	4	6	6^{5}
3	(Argentina) G Cañas	5	3
8	(Spain) R Nadal	7	6

Semifinals
WC	(Argentina) M Puerta	4	1
8	(Spain) R Nadal	6	6

=== Bottom half ===
First round
5	(Czech Republic) J Novák	6	7
Q	(Costa Rica) JA Marín	3	5
(Spain) D Sánchez	4	2
(Spain) Ó Hernández	6	6
(Argentina) A Calleri	7	7^{7}
(France) O Patience	5	6^{5}
(Argentina) J Mónaco	6	6
4	(Argentina) JI Chela	2	3
6	(Italy) F Volandri	6	7^{8}
(Argentina) M Zabaleta	2	6^{6}
(Spain) A Martín	6	2	7^{7}
(Czech Republic) J Vaněk	0	6	6^{1}
(Spain) A Montañés	6	6
WC	(Mexico) A Hernández	2	3
(Czech Republic) T Zíb	2	7	0
2	(Argentina) G Gaudio	6	5	0^{r}

Second round
5	(Czech Republic) J Novák	6	6
(Spain) Ó Hernández	3	1
(Argentina) A Calleri	7^{7}	6
(Argentina) J Mónaco	6^{4}	3
6	(Italy) F Volandri	7^{7}	7
(Spain) A Martín	6^{5}	5
(Spain) A Montañés	6	7^{17}
(Czech Republic) T Zíb	4	6^{15}

Quarterfinals
5	(Czech Republic) J Novák	5	1
(Argentina) A Calleri	7	6
6	(Italy) F Volandri	6	3	4
(Spain) A Montañés	4	6	6

Semifinals
(Argentina) A Calleri	6^{3}	6	6^{4}
(Spain) A Montañés	7^{7}	1	7^{7}

== Qualifying ==
=== Seeds ===
1. (Spain) Rubén Ramírez Hidalgo (qualifying competition)
2. (Argentina) Edgardo Massa (qualified)
3. (Spain) Marc López (qualifying competition)
4. (Ecuador) Nicolás Lapentti (qualified)
5. (United States) Hugo Armando (qualifying competition)
6. (Spain) Albert Portas (qualifying competition)
7. (Austria) Oliver Marach (first round, retired)
8. (France) Nicolas Devilder (qualified)

=== Qualifiers ===
1. (France) Nicolas Devilder
2. (Argentina) Edgardo Massa
3. (Costa Rica) Juan Antonio Marín
4. (Ecuador) Nicolás Lapentti

=== Qualifying draw ===
==== First qualifier ====
First round				Qualifying competition
				1	(Spain) Rubén Ramírez Hidalgo	4	6^{3}
	(Mexico) Miguel Ángel Reyes-Varela	0	3	8	(France) Nicolas Devilder	6	7^{7}
8	(France) Nicolas Devilder	6	6

==== Second qualifier ====
First round					Qualifying competition
2	(Argentina) Edgardo Massa	4	7^{9}	6
	(Argentina) Gastón Etlis	6	6^{7}	2	2	(Argentina) Edgardo Massa	3	6	7^{7}
	(Republic of Ireland) Kevin Sorensen	6^{6}	5		5	(United States) Hugo Armando	6	2	6^{1}
5	(United States) Hugo Armando	7^{8}	7

==== Third qualifier ====
First round				Qualifying competition
3	(Spain) Marc López	6	6
	(Netherlands) Rogier Wassen	1	1	3	(Spain) Marc López	4	4
	(Costa Rica) Juan Antonio Marín	6	0		(Costa Rica) Juan Antonio Marín	6	6
7	(Austria) Oliver Marach	3	0^{r}

==== Fourth qualifier ====
First round				Qualifying competition
4	(Ecuador) Nicolás Lapentti	6	6
WC	(Mexico) Bruno Echagaray	1	1	4	(Ecuador) Nicolás Lapentti	6^{4}	6	6
	(Mexico) Santiago González	2	3	6	(Spain) Albert Portas	7^{7}	4	3
6	(Spain) Albert Portas	6	6
