= 2004 Abierto Mexicano Telefonica Movistar – Men's singles =

Men's singles
- 2004 Abierto Mexicano Telefonica Movistar

Final
- Champion: (Spain) Carlos Moyá
- Runner-up: (Spain) Fernando Verdasco
- Score: 6–3, 6–0

Events
Singles	men	women
Doubles	men	women
← 2003 ·	Abierto Mexicano Telefonica Movistar	· 2005 →

Agustín Calleri was the defending champion but lost in the first round to Luis Horna.

Carlos Moyá won in the final 6–3, 6–0 against Fernando Verdasco.

== Seeds ==
A champion seed is indicated in bold text while text in italics indicates the round in which that seed was eliminated.

1. (Spain) **Carlos Moyá (champion)**
2. (Chile) Nicolás Massú (quarterfinals)
3. (Argentina) Agustín Calleri (first round)
4. (Argentina) Mariano Zabaleta (second round)
5. (Spain) Félix Mantilla Botella (second round)
6. (Argentina) Gastón Gaudio (second round)
7. (Argentina) Juan Ignacio Chela (semifinals)
8. (Italy) Filippo Volandri (quarterfinals)

== Draw ==
=== Key ===
- Q = Qualifier
- WC = Wild card
- LL = Lucky loser
- Alt = Alternate
- SE = Special exempt
- PR = Protected ranking
- ITF = ITF entry
- JE = Junior exempt
- w/o = Walkover
- r = Retired
- d = Defaulted
- SR = Special ranking

First round
1	(Spain) **C Moyá**	**6**	**6**
(Spain) D Sánchez	3	3
(Belgium) C Rochus	6^{4}	**6**	3
(France) **R Gasquet**	**7^{7}**	3	**6**
(Israel) H Levy	**6**	5	4
(Austria) **S Koubek**	3	**7**	**6**
(Spain) G Blanco	5	**6**	5
7	(Italy) **F Volandri**	**7**	4	**7**
3	(Argentina) A Calleri	6^{5}	4
(Peru) **L Horna**	**7^{7}**	**6**
Q	(Belgium) D Norman	4	**6**	6^{6}
(Spain) **Ó Hernández**	**6**	3	**7^{8}**
WC	(Mexico) M Gallardo-Valles	2	6^{4}
(Spain) **D Ferrer**	**6**	**7^{7}**
(Spain) A Montañés	3	4
7	(Argentina) **J I Chela**	**6**	**6**
6	(Argentina) **G Gaudio**	6^{2}	**7^{7}**	**6**
(Argentina) J Acasuso	**7^{7}**	6^{1}	1
Q	(Spain) M López	**6**	6^{3}	5
WC	(Argentina) **G Cañas**	4	**7^{7}**	**7**
(Spain) **R Ramírez Hidalgo**	**6**	**7^{7}**
(Spain) A Portas	3	6^{4}
(Ecuador) G Lapentti	**7^{7}**	2	3
4	(Argentina) **M Zabaleta**	6^{4}	**6**	**6**
5	(Spain) **F Mantilla**	**6**	**7^{7}**
Q	(France) O Patience	3	6^{4}
(Spain) **F Verdasco**	**6**	**6**
(Germany) T Behrend	2	4
Q	(United States) **J Salzenstein**	**6**	3	**6**
(Ecuador) N Lapentti	1	**6**	1
WC	(Mexico) A Hernández	2	0
2	(Chile) **N Massú**	**6**	**6**

Second round
1	(Spain) **C Moyá**	3	**6**	**6**
(France) R Gasquet	**6**	3	2
(Austria) S Koubek	4	2
8	(Italy) **F Volandri**	**6**	**6**
(Peru) L Horna	**6**	4	6^{2}
(Spain) **Ó Hernández**	3	**6**	**7^{7}**
(Spain) D Ferrer	3	3
7	(Argentina) **J I Chela**	**6**	**6**
6	(Argentina) G Gaudio	4	3
WC	(Argentina) **G Cañas**	**6**	**6**
(Spain) **R Ramírez Hidalgo**	**7**	**6**
4	(Argentina) M Zabaleta	5	3
5	(Spain) F Mantilla	**6**	4	0
(Spain) **F Verdasco**	4	**6**	**6**
Q	(United States) J Salzenstein	1	3
2	(Chile) **N Massú**	**6**	**6**

Quarterfinals
1	(Spain) **C Moyá**	3	**7**	**6**
8	(Italy) F Volandri	**6**	5	2
(Spain) Ó Hernández	**6**	0	2
7	(Argentina) **J I Chela**	3	**6**	**6**
WC	(Argentina) **G Cañas**	**6**	**6**
(Spain) R Ramírez Hidalgo	2	0
(Spain) **F Verdasco**	**6**	**6**
2	(Chile) N Massú	3	4

Semifinals
1	(Spain) **C Moyá**	**6**	**7^{7}**
7	(Argentina) J I Chela	2	6^{4}
WC	(Argentina) G Cañas	3	**6**	3
(Spain) **F Verdasco**	**6**	3	**6**

Final
1	(Spain) **Carlos Moyá**	**6**	**6**
(Spain) Fernando Verdasco	3	0
