= 2010 BCR Open Romania =

- Date: 20–26 September
- Edition: 18th
- Category: 250 series
- Draw: 32S / 16D
- Surface: Clay / outdoor
- Location: Bucharest, Romania
- Venue: Arenele BNR

Champions

Singles
- (Argentina) Juan Ignacio Chela

Doubles
- (Argentina) Juan Ignacio Chela / (Poland) Łukasz Kubot
← 2009 ·	BCR Open Romania	· 2011 →

The 2010 BCR Open Romania was a men's tennis tournament played on outdoor clay courts. It was the 18th edition of the event known that year as the BCR Open Romania, and was part of the ATP World Tour 250 series of the 2010 ATP World Tour. It was held at the Arenele BNR in Bucharest, Romania, from 20 September through 26 September 2010.

== Entrants ==
=== Seeds ===
Country	Player	Rank^{1}	Seed
ESP	Albert Montañés	22	1
GER	Florian Mayer	45	2
ITA	Potito Starace	50	3
ARG	Juan Ignacio Chela	51	4
ESP	Daniel Gimeno-Traver	53	5
ROM	Victor Hănescu	54	6
ITA	Andreas Seppi	58	7
FRA	Jérémy Chardy	59	8

- ^{1} Rankings are based on the rankings of September 13, 2010

=== Other entrants ===
The following players received wildcards into the singles main draw:

- (Romania) Marius Copil
- (Romania) Victor Crivoi
- (Romania) Adrian Ungur

The following players received entry from the qualifying draw:

- (Spain) Pablo Andújar
- (Spain) Albert Ramos-Viñolas
- (France) Guillaume Rufin
- (Italy) Simone Vagnozzi

The following players received entry as a Lucky loser:

- (Spain) Santiago Ventura

== Finals ==
=== Singles ===
(Argentina) Juan Ignacio Chela defeated (Spain) Pablo Andújar, 7–5, 6–1

- It was Chela's 2nd title of the year and 6th of his career.

=== Doubles ===
(Argentina) Juan Ignacio Chela / (Poland) Łukasz Kubot defeated (Spain) Marcel Granollers / (Spain) Santiago Ventura, 6–2, 5–7, [13–11]
