= 2005 Abierto Mexicano Telcel – Women's doubles =

Women's doubles
- 2005 Abierto Mexicano Telcel

Final
- Champions: (Russia) Alina Jidkova (Ukraine) Tatiana Perebiynis
- Runners-up: (Spain) Rosa María Andrés Rodríguez (Spain) Conchita Martínez Granados
- Score: 7–5, 6–3

Details
- Draw: 16 (1WC/1Q)
- Seeds: 4

Events
| Singles | men | women |
| Doubles | men | women |
| ← 2004 · | Mexican Open | · 2006 → |

Lisa McShea and Milagros Sequera were the defending champions, but Sequera did not compete this year. McShea teamed up with Jennifer Russell and lost in first round to Lilia Osterloh and Antonella Serra Zanetti.

Alina Jidkova and Tatiana Perebiynis won the title by defeating Rosa María Andrés Rodríguez and Conchita Martínez Granados 7–5, 6–3 in the final.

== Seeds ==
1. (Switzerland) Emmanuelle Gagliardi / (France) Émilie Loit (semifinals)
2. (Australia) Lisa McShea / (United States) Jennifer Russell (first round)
3. (Czech Republic) Eva Birnerová / (Czech Republic) Olga Blahotová (first round)
4. (Russia) Alina Jidkova / (Ukraine) Tatiana Perebiynis (champions)

== Draw ==
=== Key ===
- Q = Qualifier
- WC = Wild card
- LL = Lucky loser
- Alt = Alternate
- SE = Special exempt
- PR = Protected ranking
- ITF = ITF entry
- JE = Junior exempt
- w/o = Walkover
- r = Retired
- d = Defaulted
- SR = Special ranking

=== Draw ===
First round
1 | (Switzerland) E Gagliardi (France) É Loit | 0 | 7^{7} | 6
(Italy) F Pennetta (Argentina) ME Salerni | 6 | 6^{3} | 3
(Poland) M Domachowska (Slovakia) Ľ Kurhajcová | 4 | 6 | 3
(Romania) R Dragomir Ilie (Canada) M Drake | 6 | 4 | 6
4 | (Russia) A Jidkova (Ukraine) T Perebiynis | 6^{5} | 6 | 6
WC | (Mexico) M Torres Sandoval (Mexico) M Arroyo | 7^{7} | 3 | 1
Q | (Romania) E Gallovits (United States) A Haynes | 7^{9} | 7^{7}
(Spain) L Domínguez Lino (Spain) A Parra Santonja | 6^{7} | 6^{3}
(United States) L Lee-Waters (United States) K Smashey | 6^{4} | 3
(Argentina) E Krauth (United States) K Schlukebir | 7^{7} | 6
(Spain) RM Andrés Rodríguez (Spain) C Martínez Granados | 5 | 6 | 6
3 | (Czech Republic) E Birnerová (Czech Republic) O Blahotová | 7 | 3 | 4
(United States) J Ditty (Czech Republic) V Uhlířová | 6 | 6
(Germany) J Schruff (Germany) J Wöhr | 4 | 1
(United States) L Osterloh (Italy) An Serra Zanetti | 6 | 6^{5} | 7
2 | (Australia) L McShea (United States) J Russell | 0 | 7^{7} | 5

Quarterfinals
1 | (Switzerland) E Gagliardi (France) É Loit | 6 | 6
(Romania) R Dragomir Ilie (Canada) M Drake | 4 | 2
4 | (Russia) A Jidkova (Ukraine) T Perebiynis | 7 | 6
Q | (Romania) E Gallovits (United States) A Haynes | 5 | 2
(Argentina) E Krauth (United States) K Schlukebir | 1 | 3
(Spain) RM Andrés Rodríguez (Spain) C Martínez Granados | 6 | 6
(United States) J Ditty (Czech Republic) V Uhlířová | 2 | 6 | 6
(United States) L Osterloh (Italy) An Serra Zanetti | 6 | 2 | 3

Semifinals
1 | (Switzerland) E Gagliardi (France) É Loit | 3 | 0
4 | (Russia) A Jidkova (Ukraine) T Perebiynis | 6 | 6
(Spain) RM Andrés Rodríguez (Spain) C Martínez Granados | 7^{7} | 6
(United States) J Ditty (Czech Republic) V Uhlířová | 6^{4} | 3

Final
4 | (Russia) A Jidkova (Ukraine) T Perebiynis | 7 | 6
(Spain) RM Andrés Rodríguez (Spain) C Martínez Granados | 5 | 3

== Qualifying ==
=== Qualifying seeds ===
1. (Portugal) Frederica Piedade / (Spain) Laura Pous Tió (qualifying competition)
2. (Romania) Edina Gallovits / (United States) Angela Haynes (qualified)

=== Qualifiers ===
1. (Romania) Edina Gallovits / (United States) Angela Haynes

=== Qualifying draw ===
First round
1 | (Portugal) Frederica Piedade (Spain) Laura Pous Tió | 9
WC | (Mexico) Lorena Arias (Mexico) Erika Clarke | 7
(Czech Republic) Kateřina Böhmová (Spain) Paula García | 5
2 | (Romania) Edina Gallovits (United States) Angela Haynes | 8

Qualifying competition
1 | (Portugal) Frederica Piedade (Spain) Laura Pous Tió | 2 | 1
2 | (Romania) Edina Gallovits (United States) Angela Haynes | 6 | 6
