= 2009 BCR Open Romania – Singles =

Singles
- 2009 BCR Open Romania

Final
- Champion: (Spain) Albert Montañés
- Runner-up: (Argentina) Juan Mónaco
- Score: 7–6^{(7–2)}, 7–6^{(8–6)}

Details
- Draw: 32
- Seeds: 8

Events
Singles	Doubles
← 2008 ·	BCR Open Romania	· 2010 →

Gilles Simon was the defending champion, but chose not to participate that year.
Albert Montañés won in the final 7–6^{(7–2)}, 7–6^{(8–6)}, against Juan Mónaco.

== Seeds ==
1. (Romania) Victor Hănescu (first round)
2. (Spain) Nicolás Almagro (second round)
3. (Argentina) Juan Mónaco (final)
4. (Russia) Igor Andreev (first round)
5. (Spain) Albert Montañés (champion)
6. (Austria) Daniel Köllerer (second round)
7. (Italy) Andreas Seppi (first round)
8. (Uruguay) Pablo Cuevas (quarterfinals)

== Draw ==
=== Key ===
- Q = Qualifier
- WC = Wild card
- LL = Lucky loser
- Alt = Alternate
- ITF = ITF entry
- PR = Protected ranking
- SR = Special ranking
- SE = Special exempt
- JE = Junior exempt
- JR = Junior Accelerator Programme entrant
- CO = College Accelerator Programme entrant
- NG = Next Gen Accelerator Program entrant
- w/o = Walkover
- r = Retired
- d = Defaulted

=== Finals ===
Semifinals
(Germany) Simon Greul	4	3
3	(Argentina) Juan Mónaco	6	6
Q	(Spain) Santiago Ventura	6	4	1
5	(Spain) Albert Montañés	4	6	6

Final
3	(Argentina) Juan Mónaco	6^{2}	6^{6}
5	(Spain) Albert Montañés	7^{7}	7^{8}

=== Top half ===
First round
1	(Romania) V Hănescu	6^{5}	4
(Spain) Ó Hernández	7^{7}	6
(Belgium) O Rochus	7^{7}	1	4
(Argentina) M González	6^{4}	6	6
(Germany) S Greul	7	6
(Belgium) S Darcis	5	3
Q	(Italy) F Volandri	6	5	3
6	(Austria) D Köllerer	2	7	6
3	(Argentina) J Mónaco	6	6
Q	(Brazil) J Silva	2	4
(Portugal) F Gil	5	7	2
Q	(Spain) P Riba	7	5	6
(Australia) P Luczak	7	7^{8}
(Slovakia) K Beck	5	6^{6}
WC	(Romania) A Pavel	3	6^{2}
8	(Uruguay) P Cuevas	6	7^{7}

Second round
(Spain) Ó Hernández	5	6	1
(Argentina) M González	7	3	6
(Germany) S Greul	6	6
6	(Austria) D Köllerer	1	4
3	(Argentina) J Mónaco	6	6
Q	(Spain) P Riba	4	2
(Australia) P Luczak	5	4
8	(Uruguay) P Cuevas	7	6

Quarterfinals
(Argentina) M González	2	2
(Germany) S Greul	6	6
3	(Argentina) J Mónaco	6	2	6
8	(Uruguay) P Cuevas	3	6	1

Semifinals
(Germany) S Greul	4	3
3	(Argentina) J Mónaco	6	6

=== Bottom half ===
First round
7	(Italy) A Seppi	4	4
(Spain) R Ramírez Hidalgo	6	6
WC	(Romania) M Copil	6	6
(Romania) V Crivoi	3	2
(Spain) A Martín	4	6	6
(France) F Serra	6	0	4
Q	(Spain) S Ventura	6	6
4	(Russia) I Andreev	4	1
5	(Spain) A Montañés	6	6
(Italy) P Starace	4	2
WC	(Romania) P-A Luncanu	2	7^{7}	1
(Spain) M Granollers	6	6^{3}	6
(Spain) D Gimeno-Traver	6	4	3
(Italy) F Fognini	1	6	6
(Italy) S Bolelli	4	3
2	(Spain) N Almagro	6	6

Second round
(Spain) R Ramírez Hidalgo	6	6^{3}	6
WC	(Romania) M Copil	3	7^{7}	4
(Spain) A Martín	5^{r}
Q	(Spain) S Ventura	4
5	(Spain) A Montañés	6	6
(Spain) M Granollers	1	3
(Italy) F Fognini	6	7^{7}
2	(Spain) N Almagro	4	6^{3}

Quarterfinals
(Spain) R Ramírez Hidalgo	2	3
Q	(Spain) S Ventura	6	6
5	(Spain) A Montañés	6	6
(Italy) F Fognini	1	1

Semifinals
Q	(Spain) S Ventura	6	4	1
5	(Spain) A Montañés	4	6	6

== Qualifying ==
=== Seeds ===
1. (Poland) Łukasz Kubot (qualifying competition)
2. (Spain) Santiago Ventura Bertomeu (qualified)
3. (Spain) Pere Riba (qualified)
4. (Brazil) Júlio Silva (qualified)
5. (Spain) Daniel Muñoz de la Nava (qualifying competition)
6. (Germany) Dieter Kindlmann (first round)
7. (Italy) Filippo Volandri (qualified)
8. (France) Guillaume Rufin (first round)

=== Qualifiers ===
1. (Italy) Filippo Volandri
2. (Spain) Santiago Ventura Bertomeu
3. (Spain) Pere Riba
4. (Brazil) Júlio Silva

=== Draw ===
==== First qualifier ====
First round
1	(Poland) Łukasz Kubot	6	6
(Romania) Valentin Palas	3	2
(Romania) Alexandru-Daniel Carpen	6	6^{2}	6
WC	(Romania) Adrian-Marin Dancescu	2	7^{7}	4
(Romania) Tudor Dumitrescu	6	6
WC	(Romania) Mihai Badescu	4	4
(Italy) Daniele Giorgini	4	6	3
7	(Italy) Filippo Volandri	6	2	6

Second round
1	(Poland) Łukasz Kubot	6	6
(Romania) Alexandru-Daniel Carpen	4	0
(Romania) Tudor Dumitrescu	0	0
7	(Italy) Filippo Volandri	6	6

Qualifying competition
1	(Poland) Łukasz Kubot	3	2
7	(Italy) Filippo Volandri	6	6

==== Second qualifier ====
First round
2	(Spain) Santiago Ventura Bertomeu	6	6
WC	(Romania) Bogdan Andrii	3	2	2
WC	(Romania) Vlad-Cristian Smighelschi	4	3
(Romania) Teodor-Dacian Crăciun	6	6
(Romania) Robert Coman	6	6
WC	(Romania) Ioan Farcas	2	2
(Romania) Adrian Cruciat	6	6
6	(Germany) Dieter Kindlmann	2	3

Second round
2	(Spain) Santiago Ventura Bertomeu	6	6
(Romania) Teodor-Dacian Crăciun	0	3
(Romania) Robert Coman	4	4
(Romania) Adrian Cruciat	6	2^{r}

Qualifying competition
2	(Spain) Santiago Ventura Bertomeu	7^{7}	6
(Romania) Robert Coman	6^{1}	3

==== Third qualifier ====
First round
3	(Spain) Pere Riba	6	6
(Romania) Artemon Apostu-Efremov	3	1
WC	(Romania) Sergiu Margarit	0	2
(Romania) Răzvan Sabău	6	6
(Romania) Paul-Mihai Puscasu	6	6
(Romania) Adnan Al Mahmoud	2	2
WC	(Serbia) Dušan Vemić	7^{7}	4	7
8	(France) Guillaume Rufin	6^{3}	6	5

Second round
3	(Spain) Pere Riba	6	6
(Romania) Răzvan Sabău	3	0
(Romania) Paul-Mihai Puscasu	4	1
WC	(Serbia) Dušan Vemić	6	6

Qualifying competition
3	(Spain) Pere Riba	6	6
WC	(Serbia) Dušan Vemić	4	2

==== Fourth qualifier ====
First round
4	(Brazil) Júlio Silva	6	6
(Romania) Ilie-Aurelian Giurgiu	0	0
WC	(Romania) Catalin-Petre Nedelescu	0	0
(Austria) Oliver Marach	6	6
(Romania) Andrei Savulescu	6	6
(Romania) Laurentiu Erlic	3	3
(Romania) Marcel-Ioan Miron	2	6	5
5	(Spain) Daniel Muñoz de la Nava	6	4	7

Second round
4	(Brazil) Júlio Silva	6	7^{7}
(Austria) Oliver Marach	1	6^{3}
(Romania) Andrei Savulescu	2	2
5	(Spain) Daniel Muñoz de la Nava	6	6

Qualifying competition
4	(Brazil) Júlio Silva	6	6
5	(Spain) Daniel Muñoz de la Nava	3	2
