= 2005 Abierto Mexicano Telcel =

- Date: February 21 – February 27
- Edition: 12th (men) / 5th (women)
- Surface: Clay / Outdoor
- Location: Acapulco, Mexico

Champions

Men's singles
- (Spain) Rafael Nadal

Women's singles
- (Italy) Flavia Pennetta

Men's doubles
- (Spain) David Ferrer / (Spain) Santiago Ventura

Women's doubles
- (Russia) Alina Jidkova / (Ukraine) Tatiana Perebiynis
← 2004 ·	Mexican Open	· 2006 →

The 2005 Abierto Mexicano Telcel was both a men's and women's tennis tournament on the 2005 ATP and WTA Tours that was held in Acapulco, Mexico. The tournament was held from February 21 to February 27.

== Finals ==
=== Men's singles ===
(Spain) Rafael Nadal defeated (Spain) Albert Montañés 6–1, 6–0

- It was Nadal's 2nd title of the year and the 3rd of his career.

=== Women's singles ===
(Italy) Flavia Pennetta defeated (Slovakia) Ľudmila Cervanová, 3–6, 7–5, 6–3

=== Men's doubles ===
(Spain) David Ferrer / (Spain) Santiago Ventura defeated (Czech Republic) Jiří Vaněk / (Czech Republic) Tomáš Zíb 4–6, 6–1, 6–4

=== Women's doubles ===
(Russia) Alina Jidkova / (Ukraine) Tatiana Perebiynis defeated (Spain) Rosa María Andrés Rodríguez / (Spain) Conchita Martínez Granados, 7–5, 6–3
