= 2006 Abierto Mexicano Telcel – Women's doubles =

Women's doubles
- 2006 Abierto Mexicano Telcel

Final
- Champions: (Germany) Anna-Lena Grönefeld (United States) Meghann Shaughnessy
- Runners-up: (Japan) Shinobu Asagoe (France) Émilie Loit
- Score: 6–1, 6–3

Details
- Draw: 16 (1WC/1Q)
- Seeds: 4

Events
Singles	men	women
Doubles	men	women
← 2005 ·	Mexican Open	· 2007 →

Alina Jidkova and Tatiana Perebiynis were the defending champions, but none entered this year. Perebiynis opted to rest in order to compete at Indian Wells the following week.

Anna-Lena Grönefeld and Meghann Shaughnessy won the title by defeating Shinobu Asagoe and Émilie Loit 6–1, 6–3 in the final.

== Seeds ==
1. (Germany) Anna-Lena Grönefeld / (United States) Meghann Shaughnessy (champions)
2. (Japan) Shinobu Asagoe / (France) Émilie Loit (final)
3. (Argentina) Gisela Dulko / (Italy) Flavia Pennetta (quarterfinals, withdrew due to a low back dysfunction on Pennetta)
4. (Czech Republic) Iveta Benešová / (Italy) Tathiana Garbin (quarterfinals)

== Draw ==
=== Key ===
- Q = Qualifier
- WC = Wild card
- LL = Lucky loser
- Alt = Alternate
- SE = Special exempt
- PR = Protected ranking
- ITF = ITF entry
- JE = Junior exempt
- w/o = Walkover
- r = Retired
- d = Defaulted
- SR = Special ranking

=== Draw ===
First round
1	(Germany) AL Grönefeld (United States) M Shaughnessy	6	6
(Switzerland) E Gagliardi (Italy) A Serra Zanetti	0	1
Q	(Italy) S Errani (Spain) A Parra Santonja	6	1	7
(Czech Republic) E Birnerova (United States) B Mattek	3	6	5
4	(Czech Republic) I Benešová (Italy) T Garbin	6	6
(Czech Republic) H Šromová (Czech Republic) B Záhlavová	3	4
(Hungary) Á Szávay (Germany) J Wöhr	6^{5}	2
(Czech Republic) G Navrátilová (Czech Republic) V Uhlířová	7^{7}	6
(Hungary) Z Gubacsi (Italy) V Sassi	1	2
(Spain) L Domínguez Lino (Spain) M Sánchez Lorenzo	6	6
(United Kingdom) C Curran (United States) L Osterloh	2	2
3	(Argentina) G Dulko (Italy) F Pennetta	6	6
WC	(Mexico) E Clarke (Mexico) D Múñoz Gallegos	2	1
(Spain) C Martínez Granados (Spain) MJ Martínez Sánchez	6	6
(Argentina) MJ Argeri (Mexico) L Sobral	3	6	3
2	(Japan) S Asagoe (France) É Loit	6	4	6

Quarterfinals
1	(Germany) AL Grönefeld (United States) M Shaughnessy	6	6
Q	(Italy) S Errani (Spain) A Parra Santonja	1	1
4	(Czech Republic) I Benešová (Italy) T Garbin	5	3
(Czech Republic) G Navrátilová (Czech Republic) V Uhlířová	7	6
(Spain) L Domínguez Lino (Spain) M Sánchez Lorenzo
3	(Argentina) G Dulko (Italy) F Pennetta	w	/	o
(Spain) C Martínez Granados (Spain) MJ Martínez Sánchez	4	6	1
2	(Japan) S Asagoe (France) É Loit	6	4	6

Semifinals
1	(Germany) AL Grönefeld (United States) M Shaughnessy	6	6
(Czech Republic) G Navrátilová (Czech Republic) V Uhlířová	1	3
(Spain) L Domínguez Lino (Spain) M Sánchez Lorenzo	0	1
2	(Japan) S Asagoe (France) É Loit	6	6

Finals
1	(Germany) AL Grönefeld (United States) M Shaughnessy	6	6
2	(Japan) S Asagoe (France) É Loit	1	3

== Qualifying ==
=== Qualifying seeds ===
1. (Italy) Sara Errani / (Spain) Arantxa Parra Santonja (qualified)
2. (Spain) Laura Pous Tió / (Belarus) Anastasiya Yakimova (qualifying competition)

=== Qualifiers ===
1. (Italy) Sara Errani / (Spain) Arantxa Parra Santonja

=== Qualifying draw ===
First round
1	(Italy) Sara Errani (Spain) Arantxa Parra Santonja	8
WC	(Mexico) Marcela Arroyo (Mexico) Melissa Torres Sandoval	5
(Estonia) Maret Ani (Spain) Paula García	1
2	(Spain) Laura Pous Tió (Belarus) Anastasiya Yakimova	8

Qualifying competition
1	(Italy) Sara Errani (Spain) Arantxa Parra Santonja	7	3	6
2	(Spain) Laura Pous Tió (Belarus) Anastasiya Yakimova	5	6	3
