= 2010 BCR Open Romania – Singles =

Singles
- 2010 BCR Open Romania

Final
- Champion: (Argentina) Juan Ignacio Chela
- Runner-up: (Spain) Pablo Andújar
- Score: 7–5, 6–1

Details
- Draw: 32
- Seeds: 8

Events
Singles	Doubles
← 2009 ·	BCR Open Romania	· 2011 →

Albert Montañés was the defending champion, but was defeated 1–6, 3–6 by Juan Ignacio Chela in the semifinals.
Chela went on to win the tournament, defeating qualifier Pablo Andújar 7–5, 6–1 in the final.

== Seeds ==
1. (Spain) Albert Montañés (semifinals)
2. (Germany) Florian Mayer (second round)
3. (Italy) Potito Starace (quarterfinals)
4. (Argentina) Juan Ignacio Chela (champion)
5. (Spain) Daniel Gimeno-Traver (first round)
6. (Romania) Victor Hănescu (first round)
7. (Italy) Andreas Seppi (first round)
8. (France) Jérémy Chardy (quarterfinals)

== Main draw ==
=== Key ===
- Q = Qualifier
- WC = Wild card
- LL = Lucky loser
- Alt = Alternate
- ITF = ITF entry
- PR = Protected ranking
- SR = Special ranking
- SE = Special exempt
- JE = Junior exempt
- JR = Junior Accelerator Programme entrant
- CO = College Accelerator Programme entrant
- NG = Next Gen Accelerator Program entrant
- w/o = Walkover
- r = Retired
- d = Defaulted

=== Finals ===
Semifinals
1	(Spain) Albert Montañés	1	3
4	(Argentina) Juan Ignacio Chela	6	6
(Spain) Marcel Granollers	6^{5}	6	4
Q	(Spain) Pablo Andújar	7^{7}	4	6

Final
4	(Argentina) Juan Ignacio Chela	7	6
Q	(Spain) Pablo Andújar	5	1

=== Top half ===
First round
(Germany) T Kamke	6	7
(Italy) F Fognini	3	5
Q	(Italy) S Vagnozzi	7^{7}	6
WC	(Romania) M Copil	6^{4}	4
Q	(France) G Rufin	0	2
8	(France) J Chardy	6	6
(Germany) S Greul	6	6
(Poland) M Przysiężny	3	4
(Germany) B Phau	1	6	6
Q	(Spain) A Ramos-Viñolas	6	4	0
WC	(Romania) A Ungur	3	7^{8}	6
7	(Italy) A Seppi	6	6^{6}	4

Second round
1	(Spain) A Montañés	6	6
(Germany) T Kamke	4	4
Q	(Italy) S Vagnozzi	2	4
8	(France) J Chardy	6	6
4	(Argentina) JI Chela	6	6
(Germany) S Greul	1	0
(Germany) B Phau	6	6
WC	(Romania) A Ungur	2	4

Quarterfinals
1	(Spain) A Montañés	6	1	6
8	(France) J Chardy	3	6	3
4	(Argentina) JI Chela	6	6
(Germany) B Phau	3	3

Semifinals
1	(Spain) A Montañés	1	3
4	(Argentina) JI Chela	6	6

=== Bottom half ===
First round
6	(Romania) V Hănescu	6	2	1
(Spain) M Granollers	2	6	6
(Italy) F Volandri	6	6
(Poland) Ł Kubot	3	0
LL	(Spain) S Ventura	4	0
WC	(Romania) V Crivoi	6	6
5	(Spain) D Gimeno-Traver	6	5	6^{4}
(Argentina) C Berlocq	4	7	7^{7}
(Spain) P Riba	1	1
(Uruguay) P Cuevas	6	6
Q	(Spain) P Andújar	6	6
PR	(Argentina) M González	3	4

Second round
(Spain) M Granollers	4	7	6
(Italy) F Volandri	6	5	1
WC	(Romania) V Crivoi	6	6^{6}	4
3	(Italy) P Starace	4	7^{8}	6
(Argentina) C Berlocq	4	0
(Uruguay) P Cuevas	6	6
Q	(Spain) P Andújar	6	3	6
2	(Germany) F Mayer	3	6	2

Quarterfinals
(Spain) M Granollers	3	7^{9}	6
3	(Italy) P Starace	6	6^{7}	4
(Uruguay) P Cuevas	4	4
Q	(Spain) P Andújar	6	6

Semifinals
(Spain) M Granollers	6^{5}	6	4
Q	(Spain) P Andújar	7^{7}	4	6

== Qualifying ==
=== Seeds ===
1. (Netherlands) Robin Haase (first round)
2. (Spain) Pablo Andújar (qualified)
3. (Spain) Albert Ramos Viñolas (qualified)
4. (Spain) Santiago Ventura Bertomeu (qualifying competition, lucky loser)
5. (Netherlands) Thomas Schoorel (second round)
6. (France) Guillaume Rufin (qualified)
7. (Spain) Iván Navarro (qualifying competition)
8. (Italy) Simone Vagnozzi (qualified)

=== Qualifiers ===
1. (Italy) Simone Vagnozzi
2. (Spain) Pablo Andújar
3. (Spain) Albert Ramos Viñolas
4. (France) Guillaume Rufin

=== Lucky loser ===
1. (Spain) Santiago Ventura Bertomeu

=== Draw ===
==== First qualifier ====
First round
1	(Netherlands) Robin Haase	3	6^{6}
(France) Axel Michon	6	7^{8}
(United Kingdom) Daniel Smethurst	4	7^{9}	6
(Romania) Răzvan Sabău	6	6^{7}	2
(Egypt) Karim Maamoun	6	6
(Romania) Adrian Cruciat	1	4
(United Kingdom) Alexander Slabinsky	1	3
8	(Italy) Simone Vagnozzi	6	6

Second round
(France) Axel Michon	6	7^{7}
(United Kingdom) Daniel Smethurst	0	6^{0}
(Egypt) Karim Maamoun	5	4
8	(Italy) Simone Vagnozzi	7	6

Qualifying competition
(France) Axel Michon
8	(Italy) Simone Vagnozzi	w/o

==== Second qualifier ====
First round
2	(Spain) Pablo Andújar	5	6	6
(Romania) Cătălin-Ionuț Gârd	7	4	2
(Romania) Andrei Mlendea	5	4
(Romania) Victor-Mugurel Anagnastopol	7	6
(France) Alexandre Sidorenko	6	6
WC	(Romania) Sebastian Padure	1	1
(Andorra) Radu Albot	7^{7}	3	4
5	(Netherlands) Thomas Schoorel	6^{2}	6	6

Second round
2	(Spain) Pablo Andújar	6	2	7^{7}
(Romania) Victor-Mugurel Anagnastopol	2	6	6^{2}
(France) Alexandre Sidorenko	6	6
5	(Netherlands) Thomas Schoorel	3	4

Qualifying competition
2	(Spain) Pablo Andújar	7^{7}	6
(France) Alexandre Sidorenko	6^{2}	2

==== Third qualifier ====
First round
3	(Spain) Albert Ramos Viñolas	6	6
WC	(Moldova) Andrei Ciumac	3	1
(Russia) Evgeny Donskoy	5	4
(Italy) Marco Crugnola	7	6
(France) Nicolas Devilder	7	6
WC	(Romania) Adrian-Marin Dancescu	5	2
(Spain) Oscar Sabate Bretos	4	4
7	(Spain) Iván Navarro	6	6

Second round
3	(Spain) Albert Ramos Viñolas	6	6
(Italy) Marco Crugnola	1	4
(France) Nicolas Devilder	5	7^{7}	4
7	(Spain) Iván Navarro	7	6^{2}	6

Qualifying competition
3	(Spain) Albert Ramos Viñolas	6	7^{7}
7	(Spain) Iván Navarro	3	6^{4}

==== Fourth qualifier ====
First round
4	(Spain) Santiago Ventura Bertomeu	6	6
(Romania) Teodor-Dacian Crăciun	3	3
(United Kingdom) Alexander Ward	6	3
WC	(Romania) Bogdan Andrii	4	0^{r}
(Germany) Peter Torebko	4	4
(Romania) Petru-Alexandru Luncanu	6	6
(Romania) Robert Coman	2	1
6	(France) Guillaume Rufin	6	6

Second round
4	(Spain) Santiago Ventura Bertomeu	6	6
(United Kingdom) Alexander Ward	3	3
(Romania) Petru-Alexandru Luncanu	3	2
6	(France) Guillaume Rufin	6	6

Qualifying competition
4	(Spain) Santiago Ventura Bertomeu	3	2
6	(France) Guillaume Rufin	6	6
