= 2009 BCR Open Romania =

- Date: 21–27 September
- Edition: 17th
- Category: 250 series
- Surface: Clay / outdoor
- Location: Bucharest, Romania
- Venue: Arenele BNR

Champions

Singles
- (Spain) Albert Montañés

Doubles
- (Czech Republic) František Čermák / (Slovakia) Michal Mertiňák
← 2008 ·	BCR Open Romania	· 2010 →

The 2009 BCR Open Romania was a men's tennis tournament played on outdoor clay courts. It was the 17th edition of the event known that year as the BCR Open Romania, and was part of the ATP World Tour 250 series of the 2009 ATP World Tour. It was held at the Arenele BNR in Bucharest, Romania, from 21 September through 27 September 2009.

== Entrants ==
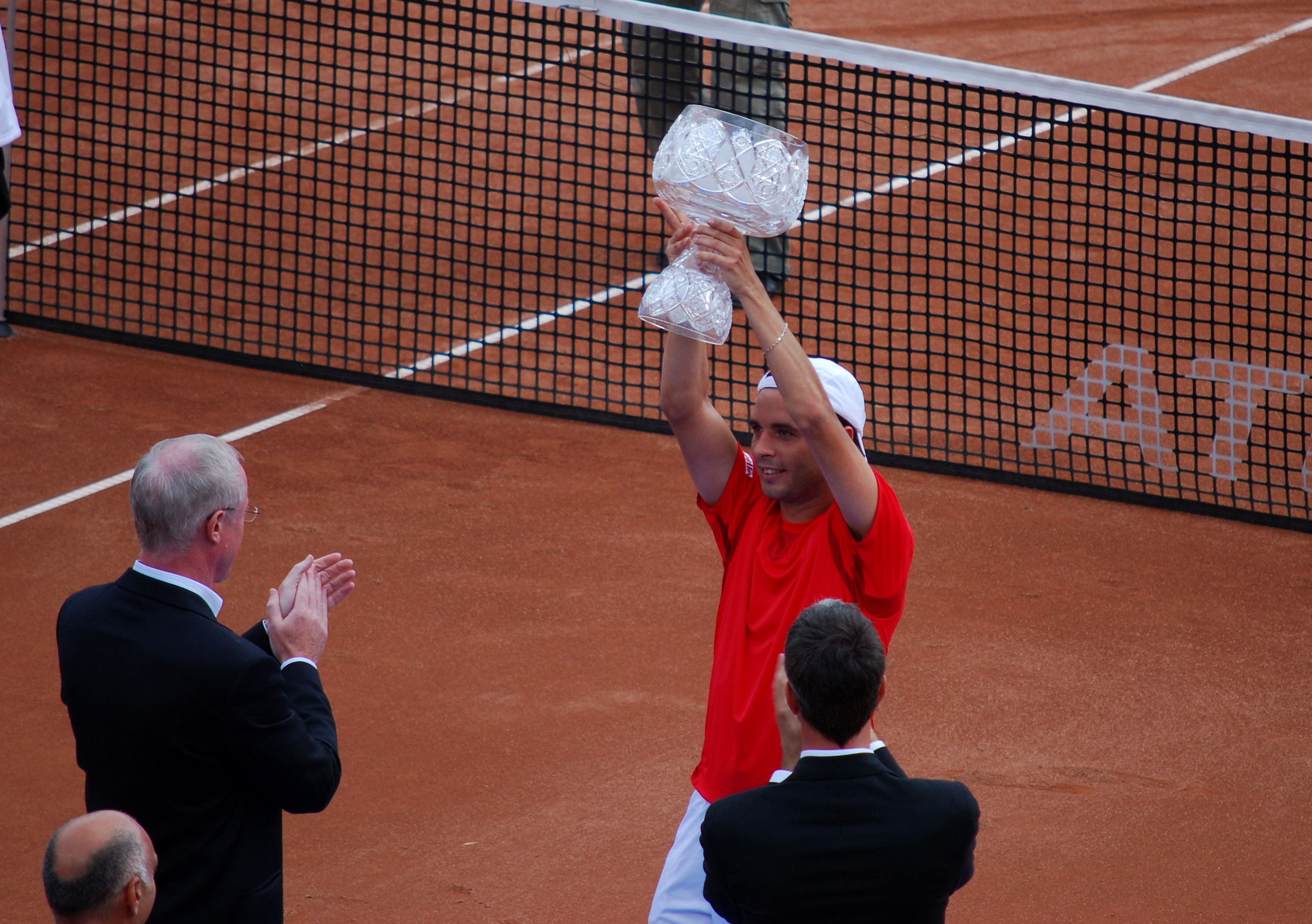
Spaniard Albert Montañés lifting the singles champion trophy

=== Seeds ===
Country	Player	Rank^{1}	Seed
ROU	Victor Hănescu	28	1
ESP	Nicolás Almagro	30	2
ARG	Juan Mónaco	37	3
RUS	Igor Andreev	43	4
ESP	Albert Montañés	46	5
AUT	Daniel Köllerer	57	6
ITA	Andreas Seppi	59	7
URU	Pablo Cuevas	60	8

- ^{1} Rankings are based on the rankings of September 14, 2009

=== Other entrants ===
The following players received wildcards into the singles main draw

- (Romania) Petru-Alexandru Luncanu
- (Romania) Andrei Pavel
- (Romania) Marius Copil

The following players received entry from the qualifying draw:

- (Spain) Pere Riba
- (Brazil) Júlio Silva
- (Spain) Santiago Ventura
- (Italy) Filippo Volandri

== Finals ==
=== Singles ===
(Spain) Albert Montañés defeated (Argentina) Juan Mónaco, 7–6^{(7–2)}, 7–6^{(8–6)}

- It was Montañés' 2nd title of the year, and the 3rd of his career.

=== Doubles ===
(Czech Republic) František Čermák / (Slovakia) Michal Mertiňák defeated (Sweden) Johan Brunström / (Netherlands Antilles) Jean-Julien Rojer, 6–2, 6–4
