= 2006 Abierto Mexicano Telcel – Women's singles =

Event in a tennis tournament

Women's singles
- 2006 Abierto Mexicano Telcel

Final
- Champion: (Germany) Anna-Lena Grönefeld
- Runner-up: (Italy) Flavia Pennetta
- Score: 6–1, 4–6, 6–2

Events
Singles	men	women
Doubles	men	women
- Abierto Mexicano Telcel

The women's singles competition at the 2006 Abierto Mexicano Telcel tennis tournament was won by the German player Anna-Lena Grönefeld.

== Draw ==
=== Finals ===
Quarterfinals
1	(Italy) Flavia Pennetta	3	7^{7}	6
Q	(Spain) María José Martínez Sánchez	6	6^{2}	0
(Spain) Laura Pous Tió	5	1
(Estonia) Maret Ani	7	6
Q	(Argentina) Natalia Gussoni	6^{3}	3
(France) Émilie Loit	7^{7}	6
(United States) Meghann Shaughnessy	1	2
2	(Germany) Anna-Lena Grönefeld	6	6

Semifinals
8	(Italy) Flavia Pennetta	6	6
(Estonia) Maret Ani	1	3
(France) Émilie Loit	4	2
2	(Germany) Anna-Lena Grönefeld	6	6

Finals
1	(Italy) Flavia Pennetta	1	6	2
2	(Germany) Anna-Lena Grönefeld	6	4	6

=== Section 1 ===
First round
1	(Italy) F Pennetta	6	6
(Italy) A Serra Zanetti	4	2
(Italy) T Garbin	6	6
(Spain) L Domínguez Lino	3	4
(Czech Republic) H Šromova	1	1
Q	(Spain) MJ Martínez Sánchez	6	6
(Estonia) K Kanepi	3	6	4
6	(Czech Republic) I Benešová	6	3	6
3	(Czech Republic) K Koukalova	6	6
Q	(Hungary) Z Gubacsi	3	3
(Spain) L Pous Tió	1	6	6
(Spain) M Sánchez Lorenzo	6	3	1
(Estonia) M Ani	6	6
WC	(Mexico) M Torres Sandoval	1	1
WC	(Mexico) D Múñoz Gallegos	1	2
7	(Israel) A Smashnova	6	6

Second round
1	(Italy) F Pennetta	6	5	6
(Italy) T Garbin	2	7	2
Q	(Spain) MJ Martínez Sánchez	6	3	6
6	(Czech Republic) I Benešová	2	6	3
3	(Czech Republic) K Koukalova	5	0
(Spain) L Pous Tió	7	6
(Estonia) M Ani	1	7^{8}	2
7	(Israel) A Smashnova	6	6^{6}	4^{r}

Quarterfinals
1	(Italy) F Pennetta	3	7^{7}	6
Q	(Spain) MJ Martínez Sánchez	6	6^{2}	0
(Spain) L Pous Tió	5	1
(Estonia) M Ani	7	6

Semifinals
1	(Italy) F Pennetta	6	6
(Estonia) M Ani	3	1

=== Section 2 ===
First round
8	(Japan) A Asagoe	3	7	3
WC	(Czech Republic) K Böhmová	6	5	6
Q	(Argentina) N Gussoni	6	7^{7}
(Czech Republic) Z Ondrášková	1	6^{4}
(United States) B Mattek	6^{2}	6	0
(Switzerland) E Gagliardi	7^{7}	2	6
(France) É Loit	7^{7}	6
4	(Argentina) G Dulko	6^{2}	2
5	(Colombia) C Castaño	4	6	6
(Spain) C Martínez Granados	6	2	3
(Argentina) M Díaz Oliva	1	0
(United States) M Shaughnessy	6	6
Q	(Brazil) C Tiene	6	6
(Spain) A Parra Santonja	3	0
(Puerto Rico) K Brandi	3	6	1
2	(Germany) AL Grönefeld	6	3	6

Second round
WC	(Czech Republic) K Böhmová	4	6^{4}
Q	(Argentina) N Gussoni	6	7^{7}
(Switzerland) E Gagliardi	4	5
(France) É Loit	6	7
5	(Colombia) C Castaño	1	0
(United States) M Shaughnessy	6	6
Q	(Brazil) C Tiene	3	6^{3}
2	(Germany) AL Grönefeld	6	7^{7}

Quarterfinals
Q	(Argentina) N Gussoni	6^{3}	3
(France) É Loit	7^{7}	6
(United States) M Shaughnessy	1	2
2	(Germany) AL Grönefeld	6	6

Semifinals
(France) É Loit	2	4
2	(Germany) AL Grönefeld	6	6
