= 2009 BCR Open Romania – Doubles =

Doubles
- 2009 BCR Open Romania

Final
- Champions: (Czech Republic) František Čermák; (Slovakia) Michal Mertiňák
- Runners-up: (Sweden) Johan Brunström; (Netherlands Antilles) Jean-Julien Rojer
- Score: 6–2, 6–4

Events
Singles	Doubles
- BCR Open Romania

Nicolas Devilder and Paul-Henri Mathieu were the defending champions, but they chose to participate that year.

František Čermák and Michal Mertiňák won in the final 6–2, 6–4 against Johan Brunström and Jean-Julien Rojer.

== Seeds ==
1. (Poland) Łukasz Kubot / (Austria) Oliver Marach (semifinals)
2. (Czech Republic) František Čermák / (Slovakia) Michal Mertiňák (champions)
3. (Sweden) Johan Brunström / (Netherlands Antilles) Jean-Julien Rojer (final)
4. (Uruguay) Pablo Cuevas / (Spain) Marcel Granollers (semifinals)

== Draw ==
Key

- Q = Qualifier
- WC = Wild card
- LL = Lucky loser
- Alt = Alternate
- ITF = ITF entry
- PR = Protected ranking
- SR = Special ranking
- SE = Special exempt
- JE = Junior exempt
- JR = Junior Accelerator Programme entrant
- CO = College Accelerator Programme entrant
- NG = Next Gen Accelerator Program entrant
- w/o = Walkover
- r = Retired
- d = Defaulted

=== Draw ===
First round

Quarterfinals

Semifinals

Finals

1
- (Poland) Ł Kubot
- (Austria) O Marach
6
7^{7}

WC
- (Romania) A Cruciat
- (Romania) P-A Luncanu
3
6^{2}

1
- (Poland) Ł Kubot
- (Austria) O Marach
6
6

- (Argentina) M González
- (Slovakia) I Zelenay
3
2

- (Austria) D Köllerer
- (Czech Republic) J Levinský
3
4

- (Austria) D Köllerer
- (Czech Republic) J Levinský
6
6

1
- (Poland) Ł Kubot
- (Austria) O Marach
5
6
[2]

3
- (Sweden) J Brunström
- (Netherlands Antilles) J-J Rojer
4
6
[10]

3
- (Sweden) J Brunström
- (Netherlands Antilles) J-J Rojer
7
4
[10]

- (Argentina) L Arnold Ker
- (Argentina) J Mónaco
6
3
[4]

3
- (Sweden) J Brunström
- (Netherlands Antilles) J-J Rojer
6
6^{7}
[10]

- (Spain) Ó Hernández
- (Spain) A Montañés
1
2

WC
- (Romania) M Copil
- (Romania) H Tecău
4
7^{9}
[8]

WC
- (Romania) M Copil
- (Romania) H Tecău
6
6

3
- (Sweden) J Brunström
- (Netherlands Antilles) J-J Rojer
2
4

- (Spain) R Ramírez Hidalgo
- (Spain) S Ventura
6^{1}
2

2
- (Czech Republic) F Čermák
- (Slovakia) M Mertiňák
6
6

- (Romania) A Pavel
- (Romania) G Trifu
7^{7}
6

- (Romania) A Pavel
- (Romania) G Trifu
5
0

- (Czech Republic) L Friedl
- (Serbia) D Vemić
0
6^{8}

4
- (Uruguay) P Cuevas
- (Spain) M Granollers
7
6

4
- (Uruguay) P Cuevas
- (Spain) M Granollers
6
7^{10}

4
- (Uruguay) P Cuevas
- (Spain) M Granollers
3
6
[9]

- (Germany) M Kohlmann
- (Austria) A Peya
3
2

2
- (Czech Republic) F Čermák
- (Slovakia) M Mertiňák
6
3
[11]

ALT
- (Portugal) F Gil
6
6

ALT
- (Portugal) F Gil
0
3

- (United States) J Cerretani
- (Croatia) L Zovko
3
0

2
- (Czech Republic) F Čermák
- (Slovakia) M Mertiňák
6
6

2
- (Czech Republic) F Čermák
- (Slovakia) M Mertiňák
6
6
