= 2004 Abierto Mexicano Telefonica Movistar – Men's doubles =

Men's doubles
- 2004 Abierto Mexicano Telefonica Movistar

Final
- Champions: (United States) Bob Bryan (United States) Mike Bryan
- Runners-up: (Argentina) Juan Ignacio Chela (Chile) Nicolás Massú
- Score: 6–2, 6–3

Events
Singles	men	women
Doubles	men	women
← 2003 ·	Abierto Mexicano Telefonica Movistar	· 2005 →

Mark Knowles and Daniel Nestor were the defending champions but did not compete that year.

Bob Bryan and Mike Bryan won in the final 6–2, 6–3 against Juan Ignacio Chela and Nicolás Massú.

== Seeds ==
1. (United States) Bob Bryan / (United States) Mike Bryan (champions)
2. (Argentina) Mariano Hood / (Argentina) Martín Rodríguez (first round)
3. (Sweden) Simon Aspelin / (Italy) Massimo Bertolini (first round)
4. (Argentina) Martín García / (Argentina) Sebastián Prieto (first round)

== Draw ==
=== Key ===
- Q = Qualifier
- WC = Wild card
- LL = Lucky loser
- Alt = Alternate
- SE = Special exempt
- PR = Protected ranking
- ITF = ITF entry
- JE = Junior exempt
- w/o = Walkover
- r = Retired
- d = Defaulted
- SR = Special ranking

First round
1	(United States) B Bryan (United States) M Bryan	6	6
(Spain) D Ferrer (Spain) R Ramírez Hidalgo	4	1
(Israel) H Levy (Italy) F Volandri	6^{4}	3
(Spain) G Blanco (Spain) D Sánchez	7^{7}	6
4	(Argentina) M García (Argentina) S Prieto	1	4
(Poland) M Fyrstenberg (Poland) M Matkowski	6	6
WC	(Mexico) B Echagaray (Mexico) M Gallardo-Valles	7	6
WC	(Mexico) S González (Mexico) A Hernández	5	4
(Argentina) G Gaudio (Ecuador) N Lapentti	6	5	4
(Spain) Á López Morón (Spain) A Portas	4	7	6
(Argentina) J I Chela (Chile) N Massú	7^{7}	6
3	(Sweden) S Aspelin (Italy) M Bertolini	6^{4}	3
(Spain) J I Carrasco (Spain) F Mantilla	7^{7}	6
(Spain) Ó Hernández (Peru) L Horna	6^{3}	0
(Argentina) L Arnold (Argentina) A Calleri	5	6	6
2	(Argentina) M Hood (Argentina) M Rodríguez	7	1	3

Quarterfinals
1	(United States) B Bryan (United States) M Bryan	7^{7}	6
(Spain) G Blanco (Spain) D Sánchez	6^{3}	2
(Poland) M Fyrstenberg (Poland) M Matkowski	6	6
WC	(Mexico) B Echagaray (Mexico) M Gallardo-Valles	2	4
(Spain) Á López Morón (Spain) A Portas	5	5
(Argentina) J I Chela (Chile) N Massú	7	7
(Spain) J I Carrasco (Spain) F Mantilla	7	3	3
(Argentina) L Arnold (Argentina) A Calleri	5	6	6

Semifinals
1	(United States) B Bryan (United States) M Bryan	6	6
(Poland) M Fyrstenberg (Poland) M Matkowski	1	2
(Argentina) J I Chela (Chile) N Massú	3	7	7^{7}
(Argentina) L Arnold (Argentina) A Calleri	6	5	6^{5}

Final
1	(United States) B Bryan (United States) M Bryan	6	6
(Argentina) J I Chela (Chile) N Massú	2	3
