= Juan Ignacio Chela =

Argentine tennis player

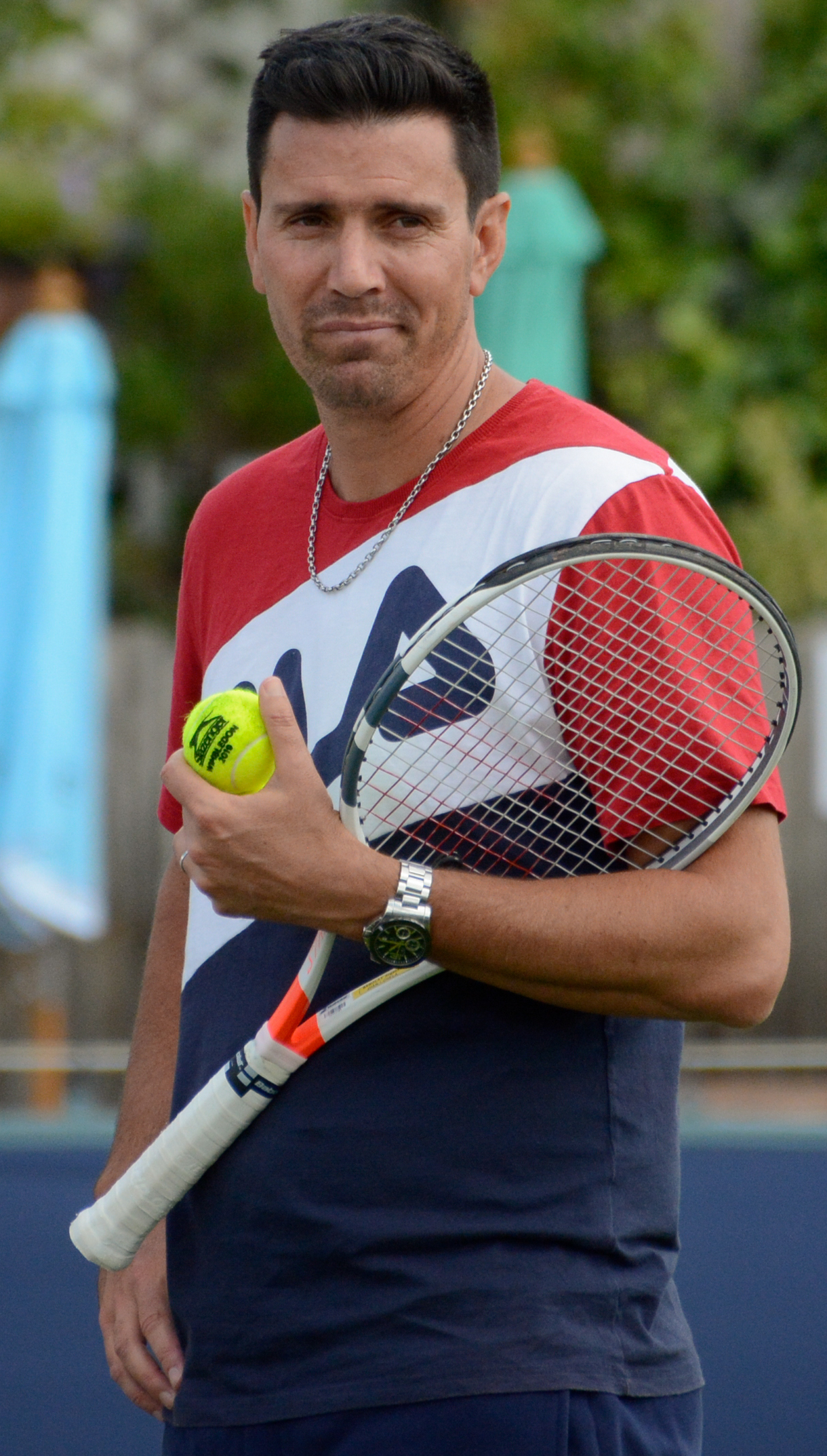
- Chela in 2019
- Country (sports): Argentina
- Residence: Buenos Aires
- Born: 30 August 1979 (age 47) Ciudad Evita, Argentina
- Height: 1.90 m (6 ft 3 in)
- Turned pro: 1998
- Retired: 3 December 2012
- Plays: Right-handed (two-handed backhand)
- Prize money: $5,601,394

Singles
- Career record: 326–277
- Career titles: 6
- Highest ranking: No. 15 (9 August 2004)

Grand Slam singles results
- Australian Open: 4R (2006)
- French Open: QF (2004, 2011)
- Wimbledon: 2R (2003, 2004, 2007, 2011)
- US Open: QF (2007)

Other tournaments
- Tour Finals: Alt (2007)
- Olympic Games: 2R (2000)

Doubles
- Career record: 104–122
- Career titles: 3
- Highest ranking: No. 32 (6 June 2011)

Grand Slam doubles results
- Australian Open: 3R (2004)
- French Open: 3R (2004, 2008)
- Wimbledon: SF (2010)
- US Open: 2R (2006)

Juan Ignacio Chela (Spanish pronunciation: [xwan iɣˈnasjo ˈtʃela]; born 30 August 1979), nicknamed as "El Flaco" or "Liliano," is a tennis coach and former professional player from Argentina. He reached a career-high singles ranking of world No. 15 in August 2004.

Chela was given a three-month ban from the professional tour in 2001 for failing a drugs test. Post-doping ban, Chela went on to reach the quarterfinals of the 2004 and 2011 French Open, and the 2007 US Open.

== Career ==
=== 2000–2001: Failed drugs test and doping suspension ===
In April 2001, Chela was found to have failed a routine drugs test (in August 2000) – testing positive for the banned steroid methyltestosterone – and was given a three-month ban, as well as being made to forfeit all prize money and ranking points accumulated over the previous eight months since testing positive.

=== 2004–2005: World No. 15 ===
In February 2024, he reached the quarterfinals in Salvador, defeating Flávio Saretta and David Ferrer, before falling to Agustín Calleri, 3–6, 6–3, 3–6. He won in doubles in Viña del Mar, partnering Gastón Gaudio. In Acapulco and Indian Wells, he reached the quarterfinals, but lost to Óscar Hernández Pérez and Roger Federer, respectively. In Acapulco, he also reached the final in doubles, partnering Nicolás Massú, but they lost to the Bryan brothers, 2–6, 3–6.

In April, Chela won in Estoril against Marat Safin, 6–7, 6–3, 6–3. He also won in doubles, partnering Gastón Gaudio.

He reached the quarterfinals of the French Open, where he lost to Tim Henman, 2–6, 4–6, 4–6. In doubles, he reached the quarterfinals in Rome, where he and Guillermo Cañas lost to the Bryan brothers, and in Hamburg, where he also partnered with Cañas.

On August 9, 2004, he reached his career-high singles ranking of world No. 15.

Chela (The Torino) was involved in a controversy during a third-round loss to Lleyton Hewitt in the Australian Open in 2005, when he attempted to spit on Hewitt.

=== 2006–2007: US Open quarterfinal ===
In April 2006, as part of the Argentine team for the Davis Cup, he held a record of six victories and four losses, the most important of his victories, giving Argentina the third point to beat defending champions Croatia in the quarterfinals.

In May 2007, he appeared in the quarterfinals of his sixth different Masters event at Rome, also his personal best showing, with wins over Marc Gicquel, Igor Andreev, and world No. 3 Andy Roddick, the latter being Chela's best victory since defeating No. 3 Yevgeny Kafelnikov in the second round in Mallorca in May 2000. He also partnered Pablo Cuevas in doubles, reaching the quarterfinals in Barcelona, where they lost to the Bryan brothers in straight sets.

In July, he reached the semifinals in Stuttgart, where he lost to Stan Wawrinka, 7–6, 4–6, 1–6. He reached the quarterfinals of the US Open, but lost to David Ferrer, 2–6, 3–6, 5–7. In October, he reached the quarterfinals in Vienna, where he lost to Novak Djokovic, 3–6, 7–5, 6–7 and reached the semifinals in doubles, partnering Fernando González.

=== 2008–2009 ===
In February 2008, he reached the semifinals in Buenos Aires, only to lose to David Nalbandian, 1–6, 2–6. In April, he reached the quarterfinals in Barcelona, where he lost to Rafael Nadal, 4–6, 2–6.

In 2009, Chela played mostly Challenger tournaments, although he did reach the quarterfinals in Viña del Mar, where he lost to Tommy Robredo 6–0, 3–6, 4–6.

=== 2010: Three titles, Wimbledon doubles semifinal ===
Chela won the US Men's Clay Court Championship in Houston, defeating Sam Querrey 5–7, 6–4, 6–3, for his first ATP Tour championship in over three years. After he beat Rajeev Ram in straight sets, Chela won a controversial three-set second-round match, in which fellow countryman Eduardo Schwank was fined for his use of tactics when injured. Chela then beat defending champion Lleyton Hewitt and another Argentine Horacio Zeballos in straight sets to reach the final.

Chela also won the BCR Open Romania in singles, defeating Pablo Andújar in the final 7–5, 6–1, and doubles partnering Łukasz Kubot. In singles it was his sixth career ATP World Tour title and in doubles his third.

Chela did reach the semifinals of the 2010 Wimbledon Championships in doubles, along with his partner Eduardo Schwank.

=== 2011: French Open quarterfinal ===
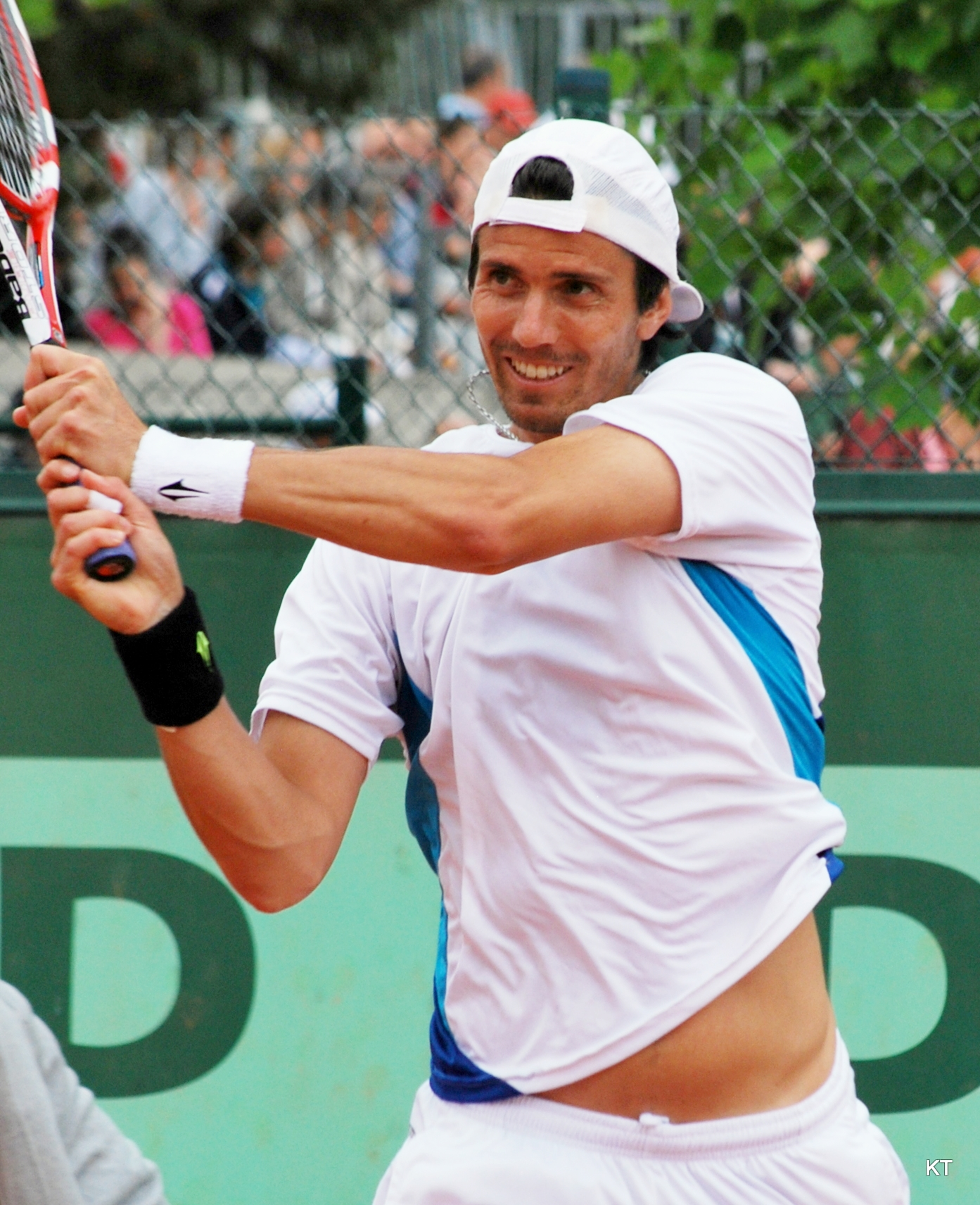
Chela at the 2012 French Open

He reached the quarterfinals in Vienna and in Santiago, and the semifinals in Costa do Sauipe, where he lost to Nicolás Almagro 6–1, 2–6, 4–6. He reached the final in Buenos Aires, where he again lost to Almagro, 3–6, 6–3, 4–6. In doubles, he reached the semifinals in Santiago, partnering Santiago González.

In April, he reached the final in doubles in Monte Carlo, partnering Bruno Soares, but they lost to the Bryan brothers in straight sets.

He reached the quarterfinals of the French Open, where he lost to Andy Murray, 6–7, 5–7, 2–6. In August, he reached the semifinals in Kitzbühel, where he lost to Albert Montañés, 2–6, 4–7. He reached his career-high doubles ranking of world No. 32 on 6 June 2011.

At the US Open, he made the third round, where he was defeated by young American Donald Young, 7–5, 6–4, 6–3.

=== 2012: Retirement ===
Chela did not make any ATP Tour finals in 2012, either in singles or in doubles. He again reached the third round of Wimbledon in doubles, along with Eduardo Schwank, losing to Daniele Bracciali and Julian Knowle in straight sets. He also reached the singles semifinals in Viña del Mar, where he lost to Carlos Berlocq and reached the doubles semifinals in Acapulco also with Schwank.

== ATP career finals ==
=== Singles: 12 (6–6) ===
Legend Grand Slam (0–0) ATP World Tour Masters 1000 (0–0) ATP World Tour 500 series (2–2) ATP World Tour 250 series (4–4)	Finals by surface Hard (0–2) Clay (6–4) Grass (0–0) Carpet (0–0)	Finals by setting Outdoors (6–6) Indoors (0–0)

Outcome	No.	Date	Tournament	Surface	Opponent	Score
Winner	1.	Feb 2000	Mexico City, Mexico	Clay	(Argentina) Mariano Puerta	6–4, 7–6^{(7–4)}
Runner-up	1.	Jan 2001	Bogotá, Colombia	Clay	(Spain) Fernando Vicente	4–6, 6–7^{(6–8)}
Runner-up	2.	Jan 2002	Sydney, Australia	Hard	(Switzerland) Roger Federer	3–6, 3–6
Winner	2.	Jul 2002	Amersfoort, Netherlands	Clay	(Spain) Albert Costa	6–1, 7–6^{(7–4)}
Runner-up	3.	Aug 2002	Long Island, United States	Hard	(Thailand) Paradorn Srichaphan	7–5, 2–6, 2–6
Winner	3.	Apr 2004	Estoril, Portugal	Clay	(Russia) Marat Safin	6–7^{(2–7)}, 6–3, 6–3
Runner-up	4.	Mar 2006	Acapulco, Mexico	Clay	(Peru) Luis Horna	6–7^{(6–8)}, 4–6
Runner-up	5.	Jul 2006	Kitzbühel, Austria	Clay	(Argentina) Agustín Calleri	6–7^{(9–11)}, 2–6, 3–6
Winner	4.	Feb 2007	Acapulco, Mexico	Clay	(Spain) Carlos Moyá	6–3, 7–6^{(7–2)}
Winner	5.	Apr 2010	Houston, United States	Clay	(United States) Sam Querrey	5–7, 6–4, 6–3
Winner	6.	Sep 2010	Bucharest, Romania	Clay	(Spain) Pablo Andújar	7–5, 6–1
Runner-up	6.	Feb 2011	Buenos Aires, Argentina	Clay	(Spain) Nicolás Almagro	3–6, 6–3, 4–6

=== Doubles: 6 (3–3) ===
Legend Grand Slam (0–0) ATP World Tour Masters 1000 (0–1) ATP World Tour 500 series (0–1) ATP World Tour 250 series (3–1)	Finals by surface Hard (0–0) Clay (3–3) Grass (0–0) Carpet (0–0)	Finals by setting Outdoors (3–3) Indoors (0–0)

Outcome	No.	Date	Tournament	Surface	Partner	Opponents	Score
Winner	1.	Feb 2004	Viña del Mar, Chile	Clay	(Argentina) Gastón Gaudio	(Ecuador) Nicolás Lapentti (Argentina) Martín Rodríguez	7–6^{(7–2)}, 7–6^{(7–3)}
Runner-up	1.	Mar 2004	Acapulco, Mexico	Clay	(Chile) Nicolás Massú	(United States) Bob Bryan (United States) Mike Bryan	6–2, 6–3
Winner	2.	Apr 2004	Estoril, Portugal	Clay	(Argentina) Gastón Gaudio	(Czech Republic) František Čermák (Czech Republic) Leoš Friedl	6–2, 6–1
Runner-up	2.	May 2005	Estoril, Portugal	Clay	(Spain) Tommy Robredo	(Czech Republic) František Čermák (Czech Republic) Leoš Friedl	6–3, 6–4
Winner	3.	Sep 2010	Bucharest, Romania	Clay	(Poland) Łukasz Kubot	(Spain) Marcel Granollers (Spain) Santiago Ventura	6–2, 5–7, [13–11]
Runner-up	3.	Apr 2011	Monte Carlo, Monaco	Clay	(Brazil) Bruno Soares	(United States) Bob Bryan (United States) Mike Bryan	6–3, 6–2

== Performance timelines ==
Key
W	F	SF	QF	#R	RR	Q#	DNQ	A	NH

(W) winner; (F) finalist; (SF) semifinalist; (QF) quarterfinalist; (#R) rounds 4, 3, 2, 1; (RR) round-robin stage; (Q#) qualification round; (DNQ) did not qualify; (A) absent; (NH) not held; (SR) strike rate (events won / competed); (W–L) win–loss record.

=== Singles ===
Tournament	2000	2001	2002	2003	2004	2005	2006	2007	2008	2009	2010	2011	2012	W–L
Grand Slam tournaments
Australian Open	A	3R	2R	2R	2R	3R	4R	3R	1R	A	1R	1R	3R	14–11
French Open	2R	A	1R	3R	QF	2R	1R	2R	2R	1R	2R	QF	1R	15–12
Wimbledon	1R	A	1R	2R	2R	A	1R	2R	A	A	1R	2R	1R	4–9
US Open	1R	A	4R	3R	1R	1R	1R	QF	A	2R	2R	3R	A	13–10
Win–loss	1–3	2–1	4–4	6–4	6–4	3–3	3–4	8–4	1–2	1–2	2–4	8–4	2–3	46–42
ATP Masters Series
Indian Wells Masters	A	1R	3R	2R	QF	3R	2R	QF	3R	1R	1R	3R	2R	12–12
Miami Masters	A	1R	QF	3R	3R	3R	4R	QF	2R	1R	2R	2R	2R	13–12
Monte Carlo Masters	3R	A	3R	QF	3R	1R	2R	2R	1R	2R	A	1R	1R	12–11
Rome Masters	1R	A	2R	2R	1R	2R	1R	QF	1R	1R	1R	3R	1R	8–12
Madrid Masters	A	A	1R	QF	2R	2R	2R	2R	A	1R	2R	1R	1R	6–10
Canada Masters	1R	A	1R	2R	3R	1R	1R	1R	A	A	2R	1R	A	4–9
Cincinnati Masters	1R	A	1R	3R	3R	3R	3R	2R	A	A	A	1R	A	9–8
Paris Masters	A	A	1R	1R	1R	A	2R	2R	A	A	1R	A	A	1–6
Hamburg Masters	A	A	3R	1R	1R	QF	1R	2R	2R	Not Masters Series				7–7
Win–loss	2–4	0–2	11–9	12–9	10–9	9–8	7–9	12–9	2–5	1–5	3–6	3–7	0–5	72–87
Career statistics
Titles / Finals	1–1	0–1	1–3	0–0	1–1	0–0	0–2	1–1	0–0	0–0	2–2	0–1	0–0	6–12
Year-end ranking	63	70	23	38	26	39	33	20	140	73	38	29	176	

=== Doubles ===
Tournament	2003	2004	2005	2006	2008	2009	2010	2011	2012	W–L
Australian Open	2R	3R	2R	3R			1R	1R	2R	7–7
French Open	2R	3R	2R	1R	3R	1R	1R	1R	2R	7–9
Wimbledon	2R	1R					SF	3R		7–4
US Open	1R	1R	1R	2R		3R	2R	2R		5–7
Win–loss	3–4	4–4	2–3	3–3	2–1	2–2	5–4	3–4	2–2	26–27

== Top-10 wins ==
Season	1997	1998	1999	2000	2001	2002	2003	2004	2005	2006	2007	2008	2009	2010	2011	2012	Total
Wins	0	0	0	3	1	2	3	1	2	2	2	0	0	1	0	0	17

#	Player	Rank	Event	Surface	Rd	Score	CR
2000
1.	(Brazil) Gustavo Kuerten	6	Mexico City, Mexico	Clay	2R	3–6, 7–6^{(10–8)}, 6–4	129
2.	(United Kingdom) Tim Henman	10	Monte Carlo, Monaco	Clay	2R	6–2, 4–6, 6–3	84
3.	(Russia) Yevgeny Kafelnikov	3	Mallorca, Spain	Clay	2R	5–7, 6–0, 6–3	59
2001
4.	(France) Sébastien Grosjean	7	Amsterdam, Netherlands	Clay	1R	6–4, 6–4	826
2002
5.	(Spain) Albert Costa	7	Amersfoot, Netherlands	Clay	F	6–1, 7–6^{(7–4)}	28
6.	(United Kingdom) Tim Henman	5	US Open, New York	Hard	3R	6–3, 6–3, 6–2	24
2003
7.	(Spain) Albert Costa	8	Sydney, Australia	Hard	1R	7–6^{(7–4)}, 6–1	23
8.	(Argentina) David Nalbandian	10	Indian Wells, United States	Hard	1R	4–6, 6–4, 7–5	30
9.	(Czech Republic) Jiří Novák	9	Monte Carlo, Monaco	Clay	2R	6–4, 6–2	33
2004
10.	(Australia) Lleyton Hewitt	9	Indian Wells, United States	Hard	3R	6–3, 4–6, 6–1	34
2005
11.	(United Kingdom) Tim Henman	9	Hamburg, Germany	Clay	3R	3–6, 6–4, 6–2	40
12.	(Russia) Nikolay Davydenko	6	New Haven, United States	Hard	2R	6–1, 7–6^{(7–5)}	50
2006
13.	(Australia) Lleyton Hewitt	6	Australian Open, Melbourne	Hard	2R	6–4, 6–4, 6–7^{(8–10)}, 6–2	51
14.	(Russia) Nikolay Davydenko	6	Cincinnati, United States	Hard	1R	6–4, 2–6, 6–2	35
2007
15.	(United States) Andy Roddick	3	Rome, Italy	Clay	3R	6–0, 6–4	23
16.	(Chile) Fernando González	5	World Team Cup, Düsseldorf	Clay	RR	6–3, 7–5	21
2010
17.	(Russia) Nikolay Davydenko	6	Umag, Croatia	Clay	QF	6–2, 6–1	56

== See also ==
- List of sportspeople sanctioned for doping offences
