= 2015 BRD Năstase Țiriac Trophy – Singles =

Singles
- 2015 BRD Năstase Țiriac Trophy

Final
- Champion: (Spain) Guillermo García López
- Runner-up: (Czech Republic) Jiří Veselý
- Score: 7–6^{(7–5)}, 7–6^{(13–11)}

Events
Singles	Doubles
← 2014 ·	BRD Năstase Țiriac Trophy	· 2016 →

Grigor Dimitrov was the defending champion, but chose not to participate this year.
Guillermo García López won the title, defeating Jiří Veselý in the final, 7–6^{(7–5)}, 7–6^{(13–11)}.

== Seeds ==
The top four seeds receive a bye into the second round.

1. (France) Gilles Simon (quarterfinals)
2. (France) Gaël Monfils (semifinals)
3. (Croatia) Ivo Karlović (quarterfinals)
4. (Czech Republic) Lukáš Rosol (quarterfinals)
5. (Spain) Guillermo García López (champion)
6. (Serbia) Viktor Troicki (first round)
7. (Czech Republic) Jiří Veselý (final)
8. (Italy) Simone Bolelli (quarterfinals)

== Draw ==
=== Key ===
- Q = Qualifier
- WC = Wild card
- LL = Lucky loser
- Alt = Alternate
- SE = Special exempt
- PR = Protected ranking
- ITF = ITF entry
- JE = Junior exempt
- w/o = Walkover
- r = Retired
- d = Defaulted
- SR = Special ranking

=== Finals ===
Semifinals
(Spain) Daniel Gimeno Traver	6	1	4
7	(Czech Republic) Jiří Veselý	2	6	6
5	(Spain) Guillermo García López	6^{2}	6	6
2/WC	(France) Gaël Monfils	7^{7}	4	2

Final
7	(Czech Republic) Jiří Veselý	6^{5}	6^{11}
5	(Spain) Guillermo García López	7^{7}	7^{13}

=== Top half ===
First round
WC	(Serbia) J Tipsarević	6	6
Q	(Italy) T Fabbiano	4	3
Q	(Croatia) N Mektić	6	6
(Uzbekistan) D Istomin	3	4
(Spain) D Gimeno Traver	5	6	6
6	(Serbia) V Troicki	7	3	1
(Croatia) B Ćorić	6	6^{4}	7^{7}
(Ukraine) S Stakhovsky	2	7^{7}	6^{2}
PR	(Germany) F Mayer	6	4	5
(Tunisia) M Jaziri	4	6	7
(Argentina) D Schwartzman	3	6^{9}
7	(Czech Republic) J Veselý	6	7^{11}

Second round
1	(France) G Simon	7	6
WC	(Serbia) J Tipsarević	5	4
Q	(Croatia) N Mektić	5	2
(Spain) D Gimeno Traver	7	6
3	(Croatia) I Karlović	3	6	6
(Croatia) B Ćorić	6	3	4
(Tunisia) M Jaziri	3	1
7	(Czech Republic) J Veselý	6	6

Quarterfinals
1	(France) G Simon	7^{7}	4	2
(Spain) D Gimeno Traver	6^{5}	6	6
3	(Croatia) I Karlović	4	4
7	(Czech Republic) J Veselý	6	6

Semifinals
(Spain) D Gimeno Traver	6	1	4
7	(Czech Republic) J Veselý	2	6	6

=== Bottom half ===
First round
5	(Spain) G García López	6	6
Q	(Italy) L Giustino	2	0
(Cyprus) M Baghdatis	6	6
(Belgium) S Darcis	4	2
Q	(Estonia) J Zopp	5	1
(Serbia) D Lajović	7	6
8	(Italy) S Bolelli	7^{7}	6
(Kazakhstan) A Golubev	6^{3}	4
(Croatia) I Dodig	5	6	4
(Austria) A Haider-Maurer	7	0	6
(Russia) M Youzhny	1	6	6
WC	(Romania) M Copil	6	4	3

Second round
5	(Spain) G García López	7	6
(Cyprus) M Baghdatis	5	2
(Serbia) D Lajović	6	4	3
4	(Czech Republic) L Rosol	4	6	6
8	(Italy) S Bolelli	6	6
(Austria) A Haider-Maurer	4	4
(Russia) M Youzhny	1	2
2/WC	(France) G Monfils	6	6

Quarterfinals
5	(Spain) G García López	6	7^{9}
4	(Czech Republic) L Rosol	4	6^{7}
8	(Italy) S Bolelli	3	6^{4}
2/WC	(France) G Monfils	6	7^{7}

Semifinals
5	(Spain) G García López	6^{2}	6	6
2/WC	(France) G Monfils	7^{7}	4	2

== Qualifying ==
=== Seeds ===
1. (Germany) Tobias Kamke (first round)
2. (Moldova) Radu Albot (second round)
3. (Estonia) Jürgen Zopp (qualified)
4. (Belgium) Niels Desein (first round)
5. (Austria) Gerald Melzer (qualifying competition)
6. (Romania) Adrian Ungur (second round)
7. (Russia) Evgeny Donskoy (qualifying competition)
8. (Czech Republic) Jan Hernych (first round)

=== Qualifiers ===
1. (Italy) Lorenzo Giustino
2. (Italy) Thomas Fabbiano
3. (Estonia) Jürgen Zopp
4. (Croatia) Nikola Mektić

=== Qualifying draw ===
==== First qualifier ====
First round
1	(Germany) Tobias Kamke	6^{5}	3
(Italy) Lorenzo Giustino	7^{7}	6
WC	(Romania) Bogdan Ionuț Apostol	6	6
(Bosnia and Herzegovina) Aldin Šetkić	4	3
(Serbia) Laslo Djere	6^{4}	2
(United Kingdom) Daniel Cox	7^{7}	6
(Romania) Costin Pavăl	2	0
7	(Russia) Evgeny Donskoy	6	6

Second round
(Italy) Lorenzo Giustino	6	3	6
WC	(Romania) Bogdan Ionuț Apostol	4	6	2
(United Kingdom) Daniel Cox	6^{3}	2
7	(Russia) Evgeny Donskoy	7^{7}	6

Qualifying competition
(Italy) Lorenzo Giustino	6	6
7	(Russia) Evgeny Donskoy	3	4

==== Second qualifier ====
First round
2	(Moldova) Radu Albot	6	6
(Russia) Philipp Davydenko	2	1
(Romania) Dragoș Dima	6	6
(Austria) Bastian Trinker	3	4
(Croatia) Toni Androić	4	4
(Romania) Victor Vlad Cornea	6	6
(Italy) Thomas Fabbiano	6	4	7^{8}
8	(Czech Republic) Jan Hernych	2	6	6^{6}

Second round
2	(Moldova) Radu Albot	4	6^{4}
(Romania) Dragoș Dima	6	7^{7}
(Romania) Victor Vlad Cornea	5	3
(Italy) Thomas Fabbiano	7	6

Qualifying competition
(Romania) Dragoș Dima	5	1
(Italy) Thomas Fabbiano	7	6

==== Third qualifier ====
First round
3	(Estonia) Jürgen Zopp	w/o
(New Zealand) Artem Sitak
(Romania) Petru-Alexandru Luncanu	0	6	4
(Czech Republic) Adam Pavlásek	6	3	6
(Australia) Chris Guccione	4	3
(Bulgaria) Alexandar Lazov	6	6
(Belarus) Uladzimir Ignatik	4	4
5	(Austria) Gerald Melzer	6	6

Second round
3	(Estonia) Jürgen Zopp	6	6
(Czech Republic) Adam Pavlásek	1	3
(Bulgaria) Alexandar Lazov	1	2
5	(Austria) Gerald Melzer	6	6

Qualifying competition
3	(Estonia) Jürgen Zopp	6	6
5	(Austria) Gerald Melzer	3	3

==== Fourth qualifier ====
First round
4	(Belgium) Niels Desein	6	1	3
(Serbia) Peđa Krstin	2	6	6
(Croatia) Nikola Mektić	6	6
WC	(Romania) Andrei Pătrui	2	2
WC	(Romania) Tudor Șulea	4	4
(Romania) Vasile Antonescu	6	6
WC	(Romania) Luca George Tatomir	1	7	4
6	(Romania) Adrian Ungur	6	5	6

Second round
(Serbia) Peđa Krstin	4	6	4
(Croatia) Nikola Mektić	6	4	6
(Romania) Vasile Antonescu	2	6	6
6	(Romania) Adrian Ungur	6	4	2

Qualifying competition
(Croatia) Nikola Mektić	6	6
(Romania) Vasile Antonescu	1	1
