= 2013 BRD Năstase Țiriac Trophy – Singles =

Singles
- 2013 BRD Năstase Țiriac Trophy

Final
- Champion: (Czech Republic) Lukáš Rosol
- Runner-up: (Spain) Guillermo García López
- Score: 6–3, 6–2

Events
Singles	Doubles
← 2012 ·	BRD Năstase Țiriac Trophy	· 2014 →

Gilles Simon was the defending champion, but lost in the semifinals to Lukáš Rosol.
Rosol went on to win his first ATP World Tour title of his career, defeating Guillermo García López in the final, 6–3, 6–2.

== Seeds ==
The top four seeds receive a bye into the second round.

1. (Serbia) Janko Tipsarević (quarterfinals)
2. (France) Gilles Simon (semifinals)
3. (Italy) Andreas Seppi (second round)
4. (Russia) Mikhail Youzhny (second round)
5. (Germany) Florian Mayer (semifinals)
6. (Italy) Fabio Fognini (withdrew because of fatigue)
7. (Argentina) Horacio Zeballos (first round)
8. (Serbia) Viktor Troicki (quarterfinals)

== Draw ==
=== Key ===
- Q = Qualifier
- WC = Wild card
- LL = Lucky loser
- Alt = Alternate
- SE = Special exempt
- PR = Protected ranking
- ITF = ITF entry
- JE = Junior exempt
- w/o = Walkover
- r = Retired
- d = Defaulted
- SR = Special ranking

=== Finals ===
Semifinals
(Spain) Guillermo García López	6	4	6
5	(Germany) Florian Mayer	4	6	3
(Czech Republic) Lukáš Rosol	6	6
2	(France) Gilles Simon	2	3

Final
(Spain) Guillermo García López	3	2
(Czech Republic) Lukáš Rosol	6	6

=== Top half ===
First round
(Belgium) X Malisse	1	2
(Colombia) S Giraldo	6	6
Q	(Czech Republic) J Pospíšil	2	2
Q	(Ukraine) S Stakhovsky	6	6
(Spain) G García López	3	6	6
7	(Argentina) H Zeballos	6	4	0
Q	(Germany) M Bachinger	4	3
(Romania) V Hănescu	6	6
WC	(Romania) A Ungur	3	1
(Belgium) D Goffin	6	6
Q	(Italy) F Cipolla	0	6^{1}
5	(Germany) F Mayer	6	7^{7}

Second round
1/WC	(Serbia) J Tipsarević	6	6
(Colombia) S Giraldo	3	3
Q	(Ukraine) S Stakhovsky	6	3	4
(Spain) G García López	1	6	6
4	(Russia) M Youzhny	4	3
(Romania) V Hănescu	6	6
(Belgium) D Goffin	6^{2}	6	3
5	(Germany) F Mayer	7^{7}	1	6

Quarterfinals
1/WC	(Serbia) J Tipsarević	3	6	4
(Spain) G García López	6	3	6
(Romania) V Hănescu	3	6^{3}
5	(Germany) F Mayer	6	7^{7}

Semifinals
(Spain) G García López	6	4	6
5	(Germany) F Mayer	4	6	3

=== Bottom half ===
First round
8	(Serbia) V Troicki	7^{7}	6
(Australia) M Matosevic	6^{5}	3
(Germany) T Kamke	6	6
(France) P-H Mathieu	1	3
(Luxembourg) G Müller	6^{4}	2
(Czech Republic) L Rosol	7	6
LL	(Italy) F Volandri	4	2
WC	(France) G Monfils	6	6
(Japan) T Ito	3	4
(Germany) D Brands	6	6
(Finland) J Nieminen	1	6	7^{7}
(Russia) E Donskoy	6	4	6^{3}

Second round
8	(Serbia) V Troicki	6	6
(Germany) T Kamke	4	2
(Czech Republic) L Rosol	6	3	6
3	(Italy) A Seppi	1	6	3
WC	(France) G Monfils	6^{1}	0^{r}
(Germany) D Brands	7^{7}	2
(Finland) J Nieminen	6	4	4
2	(France) G Simon	4	6	6

Quarterfinals
8	(Serbia) V Troicki	3	1
(Czech Republic) L Rosol	6	6
(Germany) D Brands	1	5
2	(France) G Simon	6	7

Semifinals
(Czech Republic) L Rosol	6	6
2	(France) G Simon	2	3

== Qualifying ==
=== Seeds ===
1. (Ukraine) Serhiy Stakhovsky (qualified)
2. (Germany) Matthias Bachinger (qualified)
3. (Italy) Filippo Volandri (qualifying competition, retired, lucky loser)
4. (Belgium) Steve Darcis (qualifying competition)
5. (France) Marc Gicquel (first round)
6. (Romania) Marius Copil (qualifying competition)
7. (Italy) Flavio Cipolla (qualified)
8. (France) Florent Serra (qualifying competition)

=== Qualifiers ===
1. (Ukraine) Serhiy Stakhovsky
2. (Germany) Matthias Bachinger
3. (Italy) Flavio Cipolla
4. (Czech Republic) Jaroslav Pospíšil

=== Lucky loser ===
1. ' (Italy) Filippo Volandri

=== Draw ===
==== First qualifier ====
First round
1	(Ukraine) Serhiy Stakhovsky	6	7
WC	(Romania) Patrick Ciorcilă	3	5
(Belgium) Ruben Bemelmans	4	4
(Republic of Ireland) James McGee	6	6
(Italy) Alessio di Mauro	7^{7}	5	3
(Italy) Alessandro Giannessi	6^{3}	7	6
(Italy) Potito Starace	3	2
6	(Romania) Marius Copil	6	6

Second round
1	(Ukraine) Serhiy Stakhovsky	1	6	7
(Republic of Ireland) James McGee	6	1	5
(Italy) Alessandro Giannessi	3	6^{5}
6	(Romania) Marius Copil	6	7^{7}

Qualifying competition
1	(Ukraine) Serhiy Stakhovsky	7	6
6	(Romania) Marius Copil	5	2

==== Second qualifier ====
First round
2	(Germany) Matthias Bachinger	6	6
(Uzbekistan) Farrukh Dustov	4	3
(Italy) Gianluca Naso	6	3	2
(Romania) Victor Crivoi	3	6	6
(Switzerland) Henri Laaksonen	6^{2}	7	4
(Kazakhstan) Evgeny Korolev	7^{7}	5	6
(Germany) Peter Torebko	5	1
8	(France) Florent Serra	7	6

Second round
2	(Germany) Matthias Bachinger	7	6
(Romania) Victor Crivoi	5	4
(Kazakhstan) Evgeny Korolev	3	1
8	(France) Florent Serra	6	6

Qualifying competition
2	(Germany) Matthias Bachinger	6	6
8	(France) Florent Serra	4	2

==== Third qualifier ====
First round
3	(Italy) Filippo Volandri	6	6
(Latvia) Andis Juška	1	2
WC	(Romania) Petru-Alexandru Luncanu	5	4
(Italy) Marco Cecchinato	7	6
(Greece) Theodoros Angelinos	3	7^{8}	3
(Portugal) Frederico Gil	6	6^{6}	6
WC	(Romania) Tudor Cristian Sulea	0	4
7	(Italy) Flavio Cipolla	6	6

Second round
3	(Italy) Filippo Volandri	6	6
(Italy) Marco Cecchinato	0	3
(Portugal) Frederico Gil	1	4
7	(Italy) Flavio Cipolla	6	6

Qualifying competition
3	(Italy) Filippo Volandri	2	0^{r}
7	(Italy) Flavio Cipolla	6	3

==== Fourth qualifier ====
First round
4	(Belgium) Steve Darcis	6	6
WC	(Romania) Dragoș Dima	2	3
(France) Nicolas Mahut	6	6
(Austria) Dominic Thiem	3	4
(Serbia) Filip Krajinović	7	6
(Austria) Michael Linzer	5	2
(Czech Republic) Jaroslav Pospíšil	6	6
5	(France) Marc Gicquel	2	1

Second round
4	(Belgium) Steve Darcis	6	6
(France) Nicolas Mahut	4	3
(Serbia) Filip Krajinović	1	3
(Czech Republic) Jaroslav Pospíšil	6	6

Qualifying competition
4	(Belgium) Steve Darcis	4	1
(Czech Republic) Jaroslav Pospíšil	6	6
