= 2013 BRD Năstase Țiriac Trophy – Doubles =

Doubles
- 2013 BRD Năstase Țiriac Trophy

Final
- Champions: (Belarus) Max Mirnyi (Romania) Horia Tecău
- Runners-up: (Czech Republic) Lukáš Dlouhý (Austria) Oliver Marach
- Score: 4–6, 6–4, [10–6]

Events
Singles	Doubles
← 2012 ·	BRD Năstase Țiriac Trophy	· 2014 →

Robert Lindstedt and Horia Tecău were the defending champions, but Lindstedt decided to participate in Barcelona instead.
Tecău successfully defended the title alongside Max Mirnyi, defeating Lukáš Dlouhý and Oliver Marach in the final, 4–6, 6–4, [10–6].

== Seeds ==
1. (Belarus) Max Mirnyi / (Romania) Horia Tecău (champions)
2. (Austria) Julian Knowle / (Slovakia) Filip Polášek (first round)
3. (Mexico) Santiago González / (United States) Scott Lipsky (semifinals)
4. (United States) Eric Butorac / (Australia) Paul Hanley (first round)

== Draw ==
=== Key ===
- Q = Qualifier
- WC = Wild card
- LL = Lucky loser
- Alt = Alternate
- SE = Special exempt
- PR = Protected ranking
- ITF = ITF entry
- JE = Junior exempt
- w/o = Walkover
- r = Retired
- d = Defaulted
- SR = Special ranking

=== Draw ===
First round
1	(Belarus) M Mirnyi (Romania) H Tecău	6	6
(Italy) D Bracciali (Italy) P Starace	4	4
(Belgium) X Malisse (United Kingdom) K Skupski	6	1	[8]
WC	(Romania) V Hănescu (Luxembourg) G Müller	4	6	[10]
4	(United States) E Butorac (Australia) P Hanley	7^{7}	3	[5]
(Germany) M Emmrich (Finland) J Nieminen	6^{3}	6	[10]
WC	(Romania) M Copil (France) G Monfils	7	3	[9]
(Italy) A Seppi (Serbia) V Troicki	5	6	[11]
Alt	(France) N Mahut (France) G Simon	3	4
(Czech Republic) F Čermák (Slovakia) M Mertiňák	6	6
(Germany) C Kas (Germany) F Mayer	3	2
3	(Mexico) S González (United States) S Lipsky	6	6
(Czech Republic) L Dlouhý (Austria) O Marach	2	6	[10]
(Colombia) JS Cabal (Colombia) R Farah	6	3	[5]
(United Kingdom) D Inglot (Czech Republic) L Rosol	6	6
2	(Austria) J Knowle (Slovakia) F Polášek	3	4

Quarterfinals
1	(Belarus) M Mirnyi (Romania) H Tecău	7^{7}	6
WC	(Romania) V Hănescu (Luxembourg) G Müller	6^{1}	2
(Germany) M Emmrich (Finland) J Nieminen	2	6^{3}
(Italy) A Seppi (Serbia) V Troicki	6	7^{7}
(Czech Republic) F Čermák (Slovakia) M Mertiňák	2	5
3	(Mexico) S González (United States) S Lipsky	6	7
(Czech Republic) L Dlouhý (Austria) O Marach	6	6
(United Kingdom) D Inglot (Czech Republic) L Rosol	2	4

Semifinals
1	(Belarus) M Mirnyi (Romania) H Tecău	6	3	[10]
(Italy) A Seppi (Serbia) V Troicki	3	6	[8]
3	(Mexico) S González (United States) S Lipsky	4	4
(Czech Republic) L Dlouhý (Austria) O Marach	6	6

Final
1	(Belarus) M Mirnyi (Romania) H Tecău	4	6	[10]
(Czech Republic) L Dlouhý (Austria) O Marach	6	4	[6]
