= 2013 BRD Năstase Țiriac Trophy =

- Date: 22–28 April
- Edition: 21st
- Category: World Tour 250 series
- Draw: 28S / 16D
- Prize money: €467,800
- Surface: Clay / outdoor
- Location: Bucharest, Romania

Champions

Singles
- (Czech Republic) Lukáš Rosol

Doubles
- (Belarus) Max Mirnyi / (Romania) Horia Tecău
← 2012 ·	BRD Năstase Țiriac Trophy	· 2014 →

The 2013 BRD Năstase Țiriac Trophy was a men's tennis tournament played on outdoor clay courts and held in Bucharest, Romania, from 21 to 28 April 2013. It was the 21st edition of the BRD Năstase Țiriac Trophy tournament, and was part of the ATP World Tour 250 series of the 2013 ATP World Tour. The total financial commitment by this tournament was €467,800.

It was an anniversary edition of the tournament, celebrating 40 years since Ilie Năstase became the first ever No. 1 player in the ATP rankings.

== Singles main draw entrants ==
=== Seeds ===
Country	Player	Rank^{1}	Seed
SRB	Janko Tipsarević	10	1
FRA	Gilles Simon	13	2
ITA	Andreas Seppi	18	3
RUS	Mikhail Youzhny	27	4
GER	Florian Mayer	30	5
~~ITA~~	~~Fabio Fognini~~	~~32~~	~~6~~
ARG	Horacio Zeballos	40	7
SRB	Viktor Troicki	45	8

- ^{1} Rankings are as of 15 April 2013.

=== Other entrants ===
The following players received wildcards into the singles main draw:

- (France) Gaël Monfils
- (Serbia) Janko Tipsarević
- (Romania) Adrian Ungur

The following players received entry from the qualifying draw:

- (Germany) Matthias Bachinger
- (Italy) Flavio Cipolla
- (Czech Republic) Jaroslav Pospíšil
- (Ukraine) Serhiy Stakhovsky

The following player received entry as alternate:

- (Italy) Filippo Volandri

=== Withdrawals ===
Before the tournament

- (Italy) Simone Bolelli (wrist injury)
- (Italy) Fabio Fognini (fatigue)
- (Austria) Jürgen Melzer
- (Japan) Go Soeda

=== Retirements ===
- (France) Gaël Monfils (lower back injury)

== Doubles main draw entrants ==
=== Seeds ===
Country	Player	Country	Player	Rank^{1}	Seed
BLR	Max Mirnyi	ROU	Horia Tecău	18	1
AUT	Julian Knowle	SVK	Filip Polášek	57	2
MEX	Santiago González	USA	Scott Lipsky	63	3
USA	Eric Butorac	AUS	Paul Hanley	78	4

- Rankings are as of 15 April 2013.

=== Other entrants ===
The following pairs received wildcards into the doubles main draw:

- (Romania) Marius Copil / (France) Gaël Monfils
- (Romania) Victor Hănescu / (Luxembourg) Gilles Müller

The following pair received entry as alternates:

- (France) Nicolas Mahut / (France) Gilles Simon

=== Withdrawals ===
Before the tournament

- (Italy) Fabio Fognini (fatigue)

== Finals ==
=== Singles ===
- (Czech Republic) Lukáš Rosol defeated (Spain) Guillermo García-López 6–3, 6–2

=== Doubles ===
- (Belarus) Max Mirnyi / (Romania) Horia Tecău defeated (Czech Republic) Lukáš Dlouhý / (Austria) Oliver Marach, 4–6, 6–4, [10–6]
