= 2014 BRD Năstase Țiriac Trophy =

- Date: 21–27 April
- Edition: 22nd
- Category: World Tour 250 series
- Draw: 28S / 16D
- Prize money: €485,760
- Surface: Clay / outdoor
- Location: Bucharest, Romania

Champions

Singles
- (Bulgaria) Grigor Dimitrov

Doubles
- (Netherlands) Jean-Julien Rojer / (Romania) Horia Tecău
← 2013 ·	BRD Năstase Țiriac Trophy	· 2015 →

The 2014 BRD Năstase Țiriac Trophy was a tennis tournament played on outdoor clay courts and held at Arenele BNR in Bucharest, Romania, from 21 to 27 April 2014. It was the 22nd edition of the BRD Năstase Țiriac Trophy tournament, and was part of the ATP World Tour 250 Series of the 2014 ATP World Tour. The event also futured an exhibition match with Goran Ivanišević, Cédric Pioline, Ilie Năstase and Andrei Pavel.

== Finals ==
=== Singles ===
- (Bulgaria) Grigor Dimitrov defeated (Czech Republic) Lukáš Rosol, 7–6^{(7–2)}, 6–1

=== Doubles ===
- (Netherlands) Jean-Julien Rojer / (Romania) Horia Tecău defeated (Poland) Mariusz Fyrstenberg / (Poland) Marcin Matkowski, 6–4, 6–4

== Points and prize money ==
=== Point distribution ===
Event	W	F	SF	QF	Round of 16	Round of 32	Q	Q3	Q2	Q1
Singles	250	150	90	45	20	0	12	6	0	0
Doubles	250	150	90	45	0	—	—	—	—	—

=== Prize money ===
Event	W	F	SF	QF	Round of 16	Round of 32	Q3	Q2	Q1
Singles	€77,315	€40,720	€22,060	€12,565	€7,405	€4,385	€710	€340	—
Doubles *	€23,500	€12,350	€6,690	€3,830	€2,240	—	—	—	—

_{* per team}

== Singles main-draw entrants ==
=== Seeds ===
Country	Player	Rank^{1}	Seed
BUL	Grigor Dimitrov	14	1
RUS	Mikhail Youzhny	15	2
FRA	Gaël Monfils	24	3
FRA	Gilles Simon	28	4
CAN	Vasek Pospisil	29	5
ITA	Andreas Seppi	35	6
FRA	Nicolas Mahut	40	7
FIN	Jarkko Nieminen	46	8

- ^{1} Rankings are as of April 14, 2014.

=== Other entrants ===
The following players received wildcards into the singles main draw:

- (Romania) Patrick Ciorcilă
- (Romania) Marius Copil
- (Bulgaria) Grigor Dimitrov

The following players received entry from the qualifying draw:

- (Georgia (country)) Nikoloz Basilashvili
- (Lithuania) Ričardas Berankis
- (France) Paul-Henri Mathieu
- (Romania) Adrian Ungur

=== Withdrawals ===
Before the tournament

- (France) Julien Benneteau
- (Spain) Guillermo García López
- (Germany) Florian Mayer
- (Serbia) Janko Tipsarević (knee injury)
- (Australia) Bernard Tomic

=== Retirements ===
- (France) Gaël Monfils (right ankle strain)

== Doubles main-draw entrants ==
=== Seeds ===
Country	Player	Country	Player	Rank^{1}	Seed
NED	Jean-Julien Rojer	ROU	Horia Tecău	51	1
USA	Eric Butorac	RSA	Raven Klaasen	57	2
POL	Mariusz Fyrstenberg	POL	Marcin Matkowski	57	3
GBR	Jamie Murray	AUS	John Peers	69	4

- Rankings are as of April 14, 2014.

=== Other entrants ===
The following pairs received wildcards into the doubles main draw:

- (Romania) Victor Crivoi / (Romania) Adrian Ungur
- (Romania) Victor Hănescu / (Romania) Andrei Pătrui

=== Withdrawals ===
During the tournament

- (Canada) Vasek Pospisil (back strain)
