= 2014 BRD Năstase Țiriac Trophy – Doubles =

Doubles
- 2014 BRD Năstase Țiriac Trophy

Final
- Champions: (Netherlands) Jean-Julien Rojer (Romania) Horia Tecău
- Runners-up: (Poland) Mariusz Fyrstenberg (Poland) Marcin Matkowski
- Score: 6–4, 6–4

Events
| Singles | Doubles |
| ← 2013 · | BRD Năstase Țiriac Trophy | · 2015 → |

Max Mirnyi and Horia Tecău were the defending champions, but Mirnyi chose not to participate. Tecău successfully defended the title alongside Jean-Julien Rojer, defeating Mariusz Fyrstenberg and Marcin Matkowski in the final, 6–4, 6–4.

== Seeds ==
1. (Netherlands) Jean-Julien Rojer / (Romania) Horia Tecău (champions)
2. (United States) Eric Butorac / (South Africa) Raven Klaasen (quarterfinals)
3. (Poland) Mariusz Fyrstenberg / (Poland) Marcin Matkowski (final)
4. (United Kingdom) Jamie Murray / (Australia) John Peers (semifinals)

== Draw ==
=== Key ===
- Q = Qualifier
- WC = Wild card
- LL = Lucky loser
- Alt = Alternate
- SE = Special exempt
- PR = Protected ranking
- ITF = ITF entry
- JE = Junior exempt
- w/o = Walkover
- r = Retired
- d = Defaulted
- SR = Special ranking

=== Draw ===
First round
1 | (Netherlands) J-J Rojer (Romania) H Tecău | 6 | 6
(France) N Mahut (France) A Mannarino | 0 | 4
PR | (United Kingdom) C Fleming (United Kingdom) R Hutchins | 7 | 6
(Germany) M Emmrich (Germany) C Kas | 5 | 3
4 | (United Kingdom) J Murray (Australia) J Peers | 6 | 6
(Poland) T Bednarek (Croatia) M Pavić | 3 | 4
(Italy) D Bracciali (Italy) A Seppi | 6 | 6
WC | (Romania) V Crivoi (Romania) A Ungur | 3 | 2
(Austria) O Marach (Romania) F Mergea | 3 | 3
(Austria) J Knowle (Canada) V Pospisil | 6 | 6
(Mexico) S González (United States) S Lipsky | 1 | 6^{4}
3 | (Poland) M Fyrstenberg (Poland) M Matkowski | 6 | 7^{7}
(Uzbekistan) D Istomin (Czech Republic) L Rosol | 7^{8} | 7
(Czech Republic) L Dlouhý (United Kingdom) J Marray | 6^{6} | 5
WC | (Romania) V Hănescu (Romania) A Pătrui | 1 | 6^{2}
2 | (United States) E Butorac (South Africa) R Klaasen | 6 | 7^{7}

Quarterfinals
1 | (Netherlands) J-J Rojer (Romania) H Tecău | 7^{7} | 7^{10}
PR | (United Kingdom) C Fleming (United Kingdom) R Hutchins | 6^{3} | 6^{8}
4 | (United Kingdom) J Murray (Australia) J Peers | 6 | 6
(Italy) D Bracciali (Italy) A Seppi | 1 | 2
(Austria) J Knowle (Canada) V Pospisil
3 | (Poland) M Fyrstenberg (Poland) M Matkowski | w/o
(Uzbekistan) D Istomin (Czech Republic) L Rosol | 6 | 3 | [10]
2 | (United States) E Butorac (South Africa) R Klaasen | 3 | 6 | [5]

Semifinals
1 | (Netherlands) J-J Rojer (Romania) H Tecău | 2 | 7^{7} | [10]
4 | (United Kingdom) J Murray (Australia) J Peers | 6 | 6^{3} | [8]
3 | (Poland) M Fyrstenberg (Poland) M Matkowski | 3 | 6 | [11]
(Uzbekistan) D Istomin (Czech Republic) L Rosol | 6 | 3 | [9]

Final
1 | (Netherlands) J-J Rojer (Romania) H Tecău | 6 | 6
3 | (Poland) M Fyrstenberg (Poland) M Matkowski | 4 | 4
