= 2015 BRD Năstase Țiriac Trophy – Doubles =

Doubles
- 2015 BRD Năstase Țiriac Trophy

Final
- Champions: (Romania) Marius Copil (Romania) Adrian Ungur
- Runners-up: (United States) Nicholas Monroe (New Zealand) Artem Sitak
- Score: 3–6, 7–5, [17–15]

Events
Singles	Doubles
← 2014 ·	BRD Năstase Țiriac Trophy	· 2016 →

Jean-Julien Rojer and Horia Tecău were the defending champions, but withdrew before their first-round match because of Tecău's right forearm injury.
Marius Copil and Adrian Ungur won the title, defeating Nicholas Monroe and Artem Sitak in the final, 3–6, 7–5, [17–15].

== Seeds ==
1. (Netherlands) Jean-Julien Rojer / (Romania) Horia Tecău (withdrew)
2. (India) Rohan Bopanna / (Romania) Florin Mergea (quarterfinals)
3. (South Africa) Raven Klaasen / (Czech Republic) Lukáš Rosol (quarterfinals)
4. (Philippines) Treat Huey / (United States) Scott Lipsky (quarterfinals)

== Draw ==
=== Key ===
- Q = Qualifier
- WC = Wild card
- LL = Lucky loser
- Alt = Alternate
- SE = Special exempt
- PR = Protected ranking
- ITF = ITF entry
- JE = Junior exempt
- w/o = Walkover
- r = Retired
- d = Defaulted
- SR = Special ranking

=== Draw ===
First round
Alt	(Serbia) D Lajović (Argentina) D Schwartzman	6	2	[10]
WC	(Romania) P Grigoriu (Romania) C Pavăl	4	6	[6]
(Italy) S Bolelli (Belgium) S Darcis	3	6	[10]
(Poland) M Fyrstenberg (Spain) G García-López	6	3	[5]
3	(South Africa) R Klaasen (Czech Republic) L Rosol	6	6
(Czech Republic) F Čermák (Czech Republic) J Veselý	2	2
(Austria) O Marach (Austria) P Oswald	3	6^{4}
(United States) N Monroe (New Zealand) A Sitak	6	7^{7}
(United Kingdom) C Fleming (United Kingdom) J Marray	7^{7}	6
(Croatia) M Pavić (New Zealand) M Venus	6^{4}	3
Alt	(Kazakhstan) A Golubev (Uzbekistan) D Istomin	3	4
4	(Philippines) T Huey (United States) S Lipsky	6	6
(Australia) C Guccione (Brazil) A Sá	1	2
WC	(Romania) M Copil (Romania) A Ungur	6	6
(Cyprus) M Baghdatis (Russia) M Youzhny
2	(India) R Bopanna (Romania) F Mergea	w/o

Quarterfinals
Alt	(Serbia) D Lajović (Argentina) D Schwartzman	5	5
(Italy) S Bolelli (Belgium) S Darcis	7	7
3	(South Africa) R Klaasen (Czech Republic) L Rosol	1	2
(United States) N Monroe (New Zealand) A Sitak	6	6
(United Kingdom) C Fleming (United Kingdom) J Marray	2	6	[10]
4	(Philippines) T Huey (United States) S Lipsky	6	3	[8]
WC	(Romania) M Copil (Romania) A Ungur	6	7^{8}
2	(India) R Bopanna (Romania) F Mergea	4	6^{6}

Semifinals
(Italy) S Bolelli (Belgium) S Darcis	0^{r}
(United States) N Monroe (New Zealand) A Sitak	1
(United Kingdom) C Fleming (United Kingdom) J Marray	4	6	[6]
WC	(Romania) M Copil (Romania) A Ungur	6	3	[10]

Final
(United States) N Monroe (New Zealand) A Sitak	6	5	[15]
WC	(Romania) M Copil (Romania) A Ungur	3	7	[17]
