= 2016 BRD Năstase Țiriac Trophy =

- Date: 18–25 April
- Edition: 24th
- Category: 250 series
- Draw: 28S / 16D
- Prize money: €463,520
- Surface: Clay / outdoor
- Location: Bucharest, Romania
- Venue: Arenele BNR

Champions

Singles
- (Spain) Fernando Verdasco

Doubles
- (Romania) Florin Mergea / (Romania) Horia Tecău
← 2015 ·	BRD Năstase Țiriac Trophy	· 2024 →

The 2016 BRD Năstase Țiriac Trophy was a tennis tournament played on outdoor clay courts and held at Arenele BNR in Bucharest, Romania, from 18 to 25 April 2016. It was the 24th edition of the BRD Năstase Țiriac Trophy tournament, and part of the ATP World Tour 250 series of the 2016 ATP World Tour.

== Finals ==
=== Singles ===
- (Spain) Fernando Verdasco defeated (France) Lucas Pouille, 6–3, 6–2

=== Doubles ===
- (Romania) Florin Mergea / (Romania) Horia Tecău defeated (Australia) Chris Guccione / (Brazil) André Sá, 7–5, 6–4

== Singles main draw entrants ==
=== Seeds ===
Country	Player	Rank^{1}	Seed
AUS	Bernard Tomic	21	1
CRO	Ivo Karlović	30	2
ARG	Federico Delbonis	36	3
ESP	Guillermo García-López	38	4
CYP	Marcos Baghdatis	40	5
ARG	Guido Pella	47	6
ITA	Paolo Lorenzi	53	7
FRA	Paul-Henri Mathieu	58	8

- ^{1} Rankings are as of April 11, 2016.

=== Other entrants ===
The following players received wildcards into the singles main draw:

- (Romania) Marius Copil
- (Australia) Bernard Tomic
- (Romania) Adrian Ungur

The following players received entry from the qualifying draw:

- (Moldova) Radu Albot
- (Italy) Andrea Arnaboldi
- (Austria) Michael Linzer
- (Bosnia and Herzegovina) Aldin Šetkić

=== Withdrawals ===
Before the tournament

- (France) Nicolas Mahut →replaced by (Italy) Marco Cecchinato

== Doubles main draw entrants ==
=== Seeds ===
Country	Player	Country	Player	Rank^{1}	Seed
ROU	Florin Mergea	ROU	Horia Tecău	17	1
USA	Eric Butorac	USA	Scott Lipsky	91	2
ARG	Guillermo Durán	ARG	Máximo González	103	3
ISR	Jonathan Erlich	GBR	Colin Fleming	110	4

- Rankings are as of April 11, 2016.

=== Other entrants ===
The following pairs received wildcards into the doubles main draw:

- (Romania) Marius Copil / (Romania) Adrian Ungur
- (Romania) Victor Vlad Cornea / (Romania) Victor Hănescu

=== Withdrawals ===
During the tournament

- (Argentina) Federico Delbonis (lower back injury)
