= 2016 BRD Năstase Țiriac Trophy – Doubles =

Doubles
- 2016 BRD Năstase Țiriac Trophy

Final
- Champions: (Romania) Florin Mergea (Romania) Horia Tecău
- Runners-up: (Australia) Chris Guccione (Brazil) André Sá
- Score: 7–5, 6–4

Events
Singles	Doubles
← 2015 ·	BRD Năstase Țiriac Trophy

Marius Copil and Adrian Ungur were the defending champions, but lost in the first round to Chris Guccione and André Sá.
Florin Mergea and Horia Tecău won the title, defeating Guccione and Sá in the final, 7–5, 6–4.

== Seeds ==
1. (Romania) Florin Mergea / (Romania) Horia Tecău (champions)
2. (United States) Eric Butorac / (United States) Scott Lipsky (quarterfinals)
3. (Argentina) Guillermo Durán / (Argentina) Máximo González (first round)
4. (Israel) Jonathan Erlich / (United Kingdom) Colin Fleming (semifinals)

== Draw ==
=== Key ===
- Q = Qualifier
- WC = Wild card
- LL = Lucky loser
- Alt = Alternate
- ITF = ITF entry
- PR = Protected ranking
- SR = Special ranking
- SE = Special exempt
- JE = Junior exempt
- JR = Junior Accelerator Programme entrant
- CO = College Accelerator Programme entrant
- NG = Next Gen Accelerator Program entrant
- w/o = Walkover
- r = Retired
- d = Defaulted

=== Draw ===
First round
1	(Romania) F Mergea (Romania) H Tecău	7^{7}	7^{7}
(New Zealand) M Daniell (New Zealand) A Sitak	6^{3}	6^{5}
(Spain) G García-López (Austria) J Knowle	3	3
(Argentina) F Delbonis (Italy) P Lorenzi	6	6
3	(Argentina) G Durán (Argentina) M González	1	4
(Netherlands) W Koolhof (Netherlands) M Middelkoop	6	6
(Poland) M Fyrstenberg (Mexico) S González	7	6
(Belarus) A Bury (United States) N Monroe	5	1
(Argentina) G Pella (Czech Republic) L Rosol	6	6
(Croatia) M Draganja (Croatia) M Pavić	3	2
(Netherlands) R Haase (Pakistan) A-u-H Qureshi	7^{7}	6^{7}	[6]
4	(Israel) J Erlich (United Kingdom) C Fleming	6^{3}	7^{9}	[10]
(Australia) C Guccione (Brazil) A Sá	6	6
WC	(Romania) M Copil (Romania) A Ungur	3	4
WC	(Romania) VV Cornea (Romania) V Hănescu	2	3
2	(United States) E Butorac (United States) S Lipsky	6	6

Quarterfinals
1	(Romania) F Mergea (Romania) H Tecău	w/o
(Argentina) F Delbonis (Italy) P Lorenzi
(Netherlands) W Koolhof (Netherlands) M Middelkoop	6	6
(Poland) M Fyrstenberg (Mexico) S González	2	2
(Argentina) G Pella (Czech Republic) L Rosol	6	4	[6]
4	(Israel) J Erlich (United Kingdom) C Fleming	2	6	[10]
(Australia) C Guccione (Brazil) A Sá	2	6	[18]
2	(United States) E Butorac (United States) S Lipsky	6	2	[16]

Semifinals
1	(Romania) F Mergea (Romania) H Tecău	3	6	[10]
(Netherlands) W Koolhof (Netherlands) M Middelkoop	6	2	[8]
4	(Israel) J Erlich (United Kingdom) C Fleming	4	4
(Australia) C Guccione (Brazil) A Sá	6	6

Final
1	(Romania) F Mergea (Romania) H Tecău	7	6
(Australia) C Guccione (Brazil) A Sá	5	4
