= 2015 BRD Năstase Țiriac Trophy =

- Date: 20–26 April
- Edition: 22nd
- Category: World Tour 250 series
- Draw: 28S / 16D
- Prize money: €439,405
- Surface: Clay / outdoor
- Location: Bucharest, Romania

Champions

Singles
- (Spain) Guillermo García López

Doubles
- (Romania) Marius Copil / (Romania) Adrian Ungur
| ← 2014 · | BRD Năstase Țiriac Trophy | · 2016 → |

The 2015 BRD Năstase Țiriac Trophy was a tennis tournament played on outdoor clay courts and held at Arenele BNR in Bucharest, Romania, from 20 to 26 April 2015. It was the 23rd edition of the BRD Năstase Țiriac Trophy tournament, and part of the ATP World Tour 250 Series of the 2015 ATP World Tour.

== Finals ==
=== Singles ===
- (Spain) Guillermo García López defeated (Czech Republic) Jiří Veselý, 7–6^{(7–5)}, 7–6^{(13–11)}

=== Doubles ===
- (Romania) Marius Copil / (Romania) Adrian Ungur defeated (United States) Nicholas Monroe / (New Zealand) Artem Sitak, 3–6, 7–5, [17–15]

== Points and prize money ==
=== Point distribution ===
| Event | W | F | SF | QF | Round of 16 | Round of 32 | Q | Q3 | Q2 | Q1 |
| Singles | 250 | 150 | 90 | 45 | 20 | 0 | 12 | 6 | 0 | 0 |
| Doubles | 250 | 150 | 90 | 45 | 0 | — | — | — | — | — |

=== Prize money ===
| Event | W | F | SF | QF | Round of 16 | Round of 32 | Q3 | Q2 | Q1 |
| Singles | €80,000 | €42,100 | €22,800 | €12,990 | €7,655 | €4,535 | €730 | €350 | — |
| Doubles * | €24,280 | €12,760 | €6,920 | €3,960 | €2,320 | — | — | — | — |

_{* per team}

== Singles main-draw entrants ==
=== Seeds ===
| Country | Player | Rank^{1} | Seed |
|---|---|---|---|
| FRA | Gilles Simon | 13 | 1 |
| FRA | Gaël Monfils | 18 | 2 |
| CRO | Ivo Karlović | 22 | 3 |
| CZE | Lukáš Rosol | 31 | 4 |
| ESP | Guillermo García López | 33 | 5 |
| SRB | Viktor Troicki | 37 | 6 |
| CZE | Jiří Veselý | 46 | 7 |
| ITA | Simone Bolelli | 49 | 8 |

- ^{1} Rankings are as of April 13, 2015.

=== Other entrants ===
The following players received wildcards into the singles main draw:

- (Romania) Marius Copil
- (France) Gaël Monfils
- (Serbia) Janko Tipsarević

The following players received entry from the qualifying draw:

- (Italy) Thomas Fabbiano
- (Italy) Lorenzo Giustino
- (Croatia) Nikola Mektić
- (Estonia) Jürgen Zopp

=== Withdrawals ===
Before the tournament

- (Argentina) Carlos Berlocq →replaced by Andrey Golubev
- (United States) Sam Querrey →replaced by Daniel Gimeno Traver
- (Italy) Andreas Seppi →replaced by Malek Jaziri

== Doubles main-draw entrants ==
=== Seeds ===
| Country | Player | Country | Player | Rank^{1} | Seed |
|---|---|---|---|---|---|
| ~~NED~~ | ~~Jean-Julien Rojer~~ | ~~ROU~~ | ~~Horia Tecău~~ | ~~22~~ | ~~1~~ |
| IND | Rohan Bopanna | ROU | Florin Mergea | 42 | 2 |
| RSA | Raven Klaasen | CZE | Lukáš Rosol | 76 | 3 |
| PHI | Treat Huey | USA | Scott Lipsky | 95 | 4 |

- Rankings are as of April 13, 2015.

=== Other entrants ===
The following pairs received wildcards into the doubles main draw:

- (Romania) Marius Copil / (Romania) Adrian Ungur
- (Romania) Patrick Grigoriu / (Romania) Costin Pavăl

The following pairs received entry as alternates:

- (Kazakhstan) Andrey Golubev / (Uzbekistan) Denis Istomin
- (Serbia) Dušan Lajović / (Argentina) Diego Schwartzman

=== Withdrawals ===
Before the tournament

- (Cyprus) Marcos Baghdatis (lower back injury)
- (Romania) Horia Tecău (right forearm injury)
- (Serbia) Viktor Troicki (lower back injury)

=== Retirements ===
- (Belgium) Steve Darcis (wrist injury)
