= 2016 BRD Năstase Țiriac Trophy – Singles =

Singles
- 2016 BRD Năstase Țiriac Trophy

Final
- Champion: (Spain) Fernando Verdasco
- Runner-up: (France) Lucas Pouille
- Score: 6–3, 6–2

Details
- Draw: 28
- Seeds: 8

Events
Singles	Doubles
← 2015 ·	BRD Năstase Țiriac Trophy

Guillermo García López was the defending champion, but lost in the semifinals to Fernando Verdasco.

Verdasco went on to win the title, defeating Lucas Pouille in the final, 6–3, 6–2.

== Seeds ==
The top four seeds receive a bye into the second round.

1. (Australia) Bernard Tomic (second round)
2. (Croatia) Ivo Karlović (second round)
3. (Argentina) Federico Delbonis (semifinals)
4. (Spain) Guillermo García López (semifinals)
5. (Cyprus) Marcos Baghdatis (first round)
6. (Argentina) Guido Pella (quarterfinals)
7. (Italy) Paolo Lorenzi (quarterfinals)
8. (France) Paul-Henri Mathieu (first round)

== Draw ==
=== Key ===
- Q = Qualifier
- WC = Wild card
- LL = Lucky loser
- Alt = Alternate
- ITF = ITF entry
- PR = Protected ranking
- SR = Special ranking
- SE = Special exempt
- JE = Junior exempt
- JR = Junior Accelerator Programme entrant
- CO = College Accelerator Programme entrant
- NG = Next Gen Accelerator Program entrant
- w/o = Walkover
- r = Retired
- d = Defaulted

=== Finals ===
Semifinals
(Spain) Fernando Verdasco	6	3	6
4	(Spain) Guillermo García López	3	6	2
3	(Argentina) Federico Delbonis	6^{4}	3
(France) Lucas Pouille	7^{7}	6

Final
(Spain) Fernando Verdasco	6	6
(France) Lucas Pouille	3	2

=== Top half ===
First round
Q	(Italy) A Arnaboldi	6^{4}	4
(Netherlands) R Haase	7^{7}	6
Q	(Bosnia and Herzegovina) A Šetkić	7^{7}	1	5
(Spain) F Verdasco	6^{5}	6	7
Q	(Moldova) R Albot	7^{7}	2	6
8	(France) P-H Mathieu	6^{0}	6	1
(United Kingdom) K Edmund	7^{7}	7^{7}
(Czech Republic) L Rosol	6^{4}	6^{5}
(France) A Mannarino	6	4	4
(Spain) D Gimeno Traver	3	6	6
WC	(Romania) A Ungur	5	2
6	(Argentina) G Pella	7	6

Second round
1/WC	(Australia) B Tomic	6^{4}	7	3
(Netherlands) R Haase	7^{7}	5	6
(Spain) F Verdasco	6	6
Q	(Moldova) R Albot	3	1
4	(Spain) G García López	6	6
(United Kingdom) K Edmund	3	3
(Spain) D Gimeno Traver	1	6	2
6	(Argentina) G Pella	6	3	6

Quarterfinals
(Netherlands) R Haase	6^{6}	3
(Spain) F Verdasco	7^{8}	6
4	(Spain) G García López	7^{7}	3	7^{8}
6	(Argentina) G Pella	6^{5}	6	6^{6}

Semifinals
(Spain) F Verdasco	6	3	6
4	(Spain) G García López	3	6	2

=== Bottom half ===
First round
5	(Cyprus) M Baghdatis	2	4
(Italy) M Cecchinato	6	6
(Bosnia and Herzegovina) D Džumhur	6	3	6
WC	(Romania) M Copil	1	6	2
(Ukraine) I Marchenko	6	4	6
(Israel) D Sela	4	6	4
7	(Italy) P Lorenzi	6	6
(Argentina) D Schwartzman	3	4
Q	(Austria) M Linzer	2	0
(Japan) T Daniel	6	6
(Serbia) D Lajović	3	4
(France) L Pouille	6	6

Second round
(Italy) M Cecchinato	6	7
(Bosnia and Herzegovina) D Džumhur	3	6^{3}
(Ukraine) I Marchenko	5	2
3	(Argentina) F Delbonis	7	6
7	(Italy) P Lorenzi	6	6
(Japan) T Daniel	2	0
(France) L Pouille	6	6
2	(Croatia) I Karlović	3	4

Quarterfinals
(Italy) M Cecchinato	2	2
3	(Argentina) F Delbonis	6	6
7	(Italy) P Lorenzi	6	4	5
(France) L Pouille	4	6	7

Semifinals
3	(Argentina) F Delbonis	6^{4}	3
(France) L Pouille	7^{7}	6

== Qualifying ==
=== Seeds ===
1. (Bosnia and Herzegovina) Mirza Bašić (first round)
2. (Argentina) Máximo González (qualifying competition)
3. (Moldova) Radu Albot (qualified)
4. (Italy) Andrea Arnaboldi (qualified)
5. (Germany) Tobias Kamke (qualifying competition)
6. (Bosnia and Herzegovina) Aldin Šetkić (qualified)
7. (Italy) Federico Gaio (qualifying competition)
8. (Germany) Florian Mayer (first round)

=== Qualifiers ===
1. (Austria) Michael Linzer
2. (Bosnia and Herzegovina) Aldin Šetkić
3. (Moldova) Radu Albot
4. (Italy) Andrea Arnaboldi

=== Qualifying draw ===
==== First qualifier ====
First round
1	(Bosnia and Herzegovina) Mirza Bašić	6	6^{3}	4
(Austria) Michael Linzer	3	7^{7}	6
(Uzbekistan) Farrukh Dustov	7^{7}	6
8	(Germany) Florian Mayer	6^{3}	3

Qualifying competition
(Austria) Michael Linzer	6	6^{4}	6
(Uzbekistan) Farrukh Dustov	3	7^{7}	4

==== Second qualifier ====
First round
2	(Argentina) Máximo González	2	6	6
(France) Constant Lestienne	6	4	3
(Czech Republic) Jan Mertl	6^{2}	6	3
6	(Bosnia and Herzegovina) Aldin Šetkić	7^{7}	3	6

Qualifying competition
2	(Argentina) Máximo González	6	6^{5}	1
6	(Bosnia and Herzegovina) Aldin Šetkić	0	7^{7}	6

==== Third qualifier ====
First round
3	(Moldova) Radu Albot	6	6
WC	(France) Florian Valsot	4	2
(Serbia) Miljan Zekić	3	3
5	(Germany) Tobias Kamke	6	6

Qualifying competition
3	(Moldova) Radu Albot	6	6
5	(Germany) Tobias Kamke	4	2

==== Fourth qualifier ====
First round
4	(Italy) Andrea Arnaboldi	6	6
WC	(Romania) Bogdan Borza	0	2
(Italy) Lorenzo Giustino	4	6	4
7	(Italy) Federico Gaio	6	4	6

Qualifying competition
4	(Italy) Andrea Arnaboldi	6	6
7	(Italy) Federico Gaio	1	4
