= 2012 BRD Năstase Țiriac Trophy – Singles =

Singles
- 2012 BRD Năstase Țiriac Trophy

Final
- Champions: (France) Gilles Simon
- Runners-up: (Italy) Fabio Fognini
- Score: 6–4, 6–3

Events
| Singles | Doubles |
| ← 2011 · | BRD Năstase Țiriac Trophy | · 2013 → |

Florian Mayer was the defending champion but lost to Xavier Malisse in the second round.
Gilles Simon won the tournament defeating Fabio Fognini 6–4, 6–3 in the final.

== Seeds ==
Top 4 active seeds received a bye into the second round.

1. (France) Gilles Simon (champion)
2. (Germany) Florian Mayer (second round)
3. (Austria) Jürgen Melzer (withdrew because of an ankle injury)
4. (Serbia) Viktor Troicki (second round)
5. (Cyprus) Marcos Baghdatis (second round)
6. (Italy) Andreas Seppi (quarterfinals)
7. (Poland) Łukasz Kubot (quarterfinals)
8. (Croatia) Ivan Dodig (first round)
9. (France) Jérémy Chardy (first round)

== Draw ==
=== Key ===
- Q = Qualifier
- WC = Wild card
- LL = Lucky loser
- Alt = Alternate
- SE = Special exempt
- PR = Protected ranking
- ITF = ITF entry
- JE = Junior exempt
- w/o = Walkover
- r = Retired
- d = Defaulted
- SR = Special ranking

=== Finals ===
Semifinals
1 | (France) Gilles Simon | 7 | 6
(Germany) Matthias Bachinger | 5 | 2
(Italy) Fabio Fognini | 6 | 6
Q | (Hungary) Attila Balázs | 3 | 1

Final
1 | (France) Gilles Simon | 6 | 6
(Italy) Fabio Fognini | 4 | 3

=== Top half ===
First round
(Israel) D Sela | 7^{7} | 6
(Romania) A Ungur | 6^{2} | 2
WC | (Romania) M Copil | 6 | 6
(Germany) T Kamke | 3 | 2
WC | (Romania) G Moraru | 2 | 3
7 | (Poland) Ł Kubot | 6 | 6
(Germany) M Bachinger | 3 | 6 | 6
(Italy) F Volandri | 6 | 1 | 3
WC | (Romania) V Crivoi | 3 | 3
Q | (Estonia) J Zopp | 6 | 6
Q | (Germany) D Brands | 7^{7} | 6
8 | (Croatia) I Dodig | 6^{4} | 2

Second round
1 | (France) G Simon | 6 | 6
(Israel) D Sela | 4 | 2
WC | (Romania) M Copil | 3 | 3
7 | (Poland) Ł Kubot | 6 | 6
4 | (Serbia) V Troicki | 3 | 6 | 6^{2}
(Germany) M Bachinger | 6 | 4 | 7^{7}
Q | (Estonia) J Zopp | 6^{3} | 3
Q | (Germany) D Brands | 7^{7} | 6

Quarterfinals
1 | (France) G Simon | 3 | 6 | 6
7 | (Poland) Ł Kubot | 6 | 1 | 3
(Germany) M Bachinger | 6 | 6
Q | (Germany) D Brands | 4 | 1

Semifinals
1 | (France) G Simon | 7 | 6
(Germany) M Bachinger | 5 | 2

=== Bottom half ===
First round
6 | (Italy) A Seppi | 1 | 7^{7} | 6
Q | (France) G Rufin | 6 | 6^{5} | 4
LL | (Canada) É Chvojka | 3 | 3
(Germany) C-M Stebe | 6 | 6
(Italy) F Fognini | 7 | 7^{7}
(Brazil) J Souza | 5 | 6^{5}
9 | (France) J Chardy | 3 | 0
(Italy) P Starace | 6 | 6
Q | (Hungary) A Balázs | 6^{7} | 7^{7} | 6
(Slovakia) L Lacko | 7^{9} | 6^{2} | 4
(Belgium) X Malisse | 6 | 6
(Bulgaria) G Dimitrov | 2 | 4

Second round
6 | (Italy) A Seppi | 6 | 6
(Germany) C-M Stebe | 2 | 3
(Italy) F Fognini | 7 | 7^{7}
5 | (Cyprus) M Baghdatis | 5 | 6^{4}
(Italy) P Starace | 3 | 4
Q | (Hungary) A Balázs | 6 | 6
(Belgium) X Malisse | 7 | 4 | 6
2 | (Germany) F Mayer | 5 | 6 | 4

Quarterfinals
6 | (Italy) A Seppi | 4 | 7^{7} | 4
(Italy) F Fognini | 6 | 6^{4} | 6
Q | (Hungary) A Balázs | 4 | 6 | 6
(Belgium) X Malisse | 6 | 3 | 4

Semifinals
(Italy) F Fognini | 6 | 6
Q | (Hungary) A Balázs | 3 | 1

== Qualifying ==
=== Seeds ===
1. (Slovakia) Martin Kližan (second round)
2. (Germany) Daniel Brands (qualified)
3. (Estonia) Jürgen Zopp (qualified)
4. (France) Guillaume Rufin (qualified)
5. (Canada) Érik Chvojka (qualifying competition, lucky loser)
6. (Italy) Gianluca Naso (qualifying competition)
7. (Netherlands) Matwé Middelkoop (first round)
8. (Germany) Kevin Krawietz (second round)

=== Qualifiers ===
1. (Hungary) Attila Balázs
2. (Germany) Daniel Brands
3. (Estonia) Jürgen Zopp
4. (France) Guillaume Rufin

=== Lucky losers ===
1. (Canada) Érik Chvojka

=== Draw ===
==== First qualifier ====
First round
1 | (Slovakia) Martin Kližan | 6 | 6
WC | (Romania) Alexandru Cătălin Marasin | 4 | 2
WC | (Romania) Sebastian Kraila | 0 | 0
(Hungary) Attila Balázs | 6 | 6
(Romania) Andrei Săvulescu | 6 | 6
(Romania) Andrei Ștefan Apostol | 4 | 3
(Serbia) Miljan Zekić | 3 | 4
5 | (Canada) Érik Chvojka | 6 | 6

Second round
1 | (Slovakia) Martin Kližan | 3 | 4
(Hungary) Attila Balázs | 6 | 6
(Romania) Andrei Săvulescu | 1 | 2
5 | (Canada) Érik Chvojka | 6 | 6

Qualifying competition
(Hungary) Attila Balázs | 6 | 6
5 | (Canada) Érik Chvojka | 0 | 3

==== Second qualifier ====
First round
2 | (Germany) Daniel Brands | 6 | 6
(Romania) Alexandru-Daniel Carpen | 3 | 0
WC | (Germany) Christian Marian | 1 | 0
(Belgium) Niels Desein | 6 | 6
(Romania) Teodor-Dacian Crăciun | 6 | 3 | 2
(Romania) Andrei Mlendea | 3 | 6 | 6
WC | (Romania) Dragoș Dima | 2 | 4
6 | (Italy) Gianluca Naso | 6 | 6

Second round
2 | (Germany) Daniel Brands | 6 | 6
(Belgium) Niels Desein | 4 | 2
(Romania) Andrei Mlendea | 3 | 2
6 | (Italy) Gianluca Naso | 6 | 6

Qualifying competition
2 | (Germany) Daniel Brands | 7^{7} | 6
6 | (Italy) Gianluca Naso | 6^{5} | 2

==== Third qualifier ====
First round
3 | (Estonia) Jürgen Zopp | 6 | 6
(Finland) Timo Nieminen | 2 | 1
(Romania) Teodor Nicolae Marin | 0 | 2
(Romania) Răzvan Sabău | 6 | 6
(Croatia) Nikola Mektić | 6 | 6
(Serbia) Nikola Ćaćić | 3 | 2
(Czech Republic) Michal Konečný | 3 | 4
8 | (Germany) Kevin Krawietz | 6 | 6

Second round
3 | (Estonia) Jürgen Zopp | 6 | 6
WC | (Romania) Răzvan Sabău | 4 | 3
(Croatia) Nikola Mektić | 7^{8} | 6^{4} | 6
8 | (Germany) Kevin Krawietz | 6^{6} | 7^{7} | 3

Qualifying competition
3 | (Estonia) Jürgen Zopp | 6 | 6
(Croatia) Nikola Mektić | 3 | 2

==== Fourth qualifier ====
First round
4 | (France) Guillaume Rufin | 6 | 6
(Hungary) Ádám Kellner | 3 | 4
(Romania) Vasile-Alexandru Ghilea | 7 | 6
(Romania) Victor Anagnastopol | 5 | 3
(Romania) Robert Coman | 2 | 6 | 3
(Serbia) Ilija Bozoljac | 6 | 3 | 6
(Italy) Alessio di Mauro | 7^{7} | 6
7 | (Netherlands) Matwé Middelkoop | 6^{4} | 4

Second round
4 | (France) Guillaume Rufin | 6 | 6
(Romania) Vasile-Alexandru Ghilea | 1 | 0
(Serbia) Ilija Bozoljac | 6^{3} | 1
(Italy) Alessio di Mauro | 7^{7} | 6

Qualifying competition
4 | (France) Guillaume Rufin | 6 | 6
(Italy) Alessio di Mauro | 1 | 1
