= 2012 BRD Năstase Țiriac Trophy – Doubles =

Doubles
- 2012 BRD Năstase Țiriac Trophy

Final
- Champions: (Sweden) Robert Lindstedt (Romania) Horia Tecău
- Runners-up: (France) Jérémy Chardy (Poland) Łukasz Kubot
- Score: 7–6^{(7–2)}, 6–3

Events
Singles	Doubles
- BRD Năstase Țiriac Trophy

Daniele Bracciali and Potito Starace were the defending champions, but they lost in the first round to Paul Hanley and Jordan Kerr.
Robert Lindstedt and Horia Tecău won the final over Jérémy Chardy and Łukasz Kubot, 7–6^{(7–2)}, 6–3.

== Seeds ==
1. (Sweden) Robert Lindstedt / (Romania) Horia Tecău (champions)
2. (Austria) Julian Knowle / (Austria) Jürgen Melzer (withdrew because of Melzer's ankle injury)
3. (Italy) Daniele Bracciali / (Italy) Potito Starace (first round)
4. (United States) James Cerretani / (Italy) Fabio Fognini (semifinals)
5. (Belgium) Xavier Malisse / (Belgium) Dick Norman (first round)

== Draw ==
Key

- Q = Qualifier
- WC = Wild card
- LL = Lucky loser
- Alt = Alternate
- ITF = ITF entry
- PR = Protected ranking
- SR = Special ranking
- SE = Special exempt
- JE = Junior exempt
- JR = Junior Accelerator Programme entrant
- CO = College Accelerator Programme entrant
- NG = Next Gen Accelerator Program entrant
- w/o = Walkover
- r = Retired
- d = Defaulted

=== Draw ===
First round
1	(Sweden) R Lindstedt (Romania) H Tecău	4	6	[10]
WC	(Romania) A Dăescu (Romania) F Mergea	6	4	[2]
(Slovakia) M Mertiňák (Brazil) A Sá	3	6	[10]
Alt	(Germany) M Emmrich (Sweden) A Siljeström	6	3	[8]
3	(Italy) D Bracciali (Italy) P Starace	6	5	[8]
(Australia) P Hanley (Australia) J Kerr	4	7	[10]
(Croatia) I Dodig (Brazil) M Melo	6	6
WC	(Romania) M Copil (Germany) A Waske	1	2
(Germany) T Kamke (Germany) F Mayer	6	7^{12}
(Sweden) J Brunström (Germany) P Marx	2	6^{10}
(Italy) A Seppi (Italy) F Volandri	6^{3}	4
4	(United States) J Cerretani (Italy) F Fognini	7^{7}	6
(Cyprus) M Baghdatis (United Kingdom) R Hutchins	2	4
(France) J Chardy (Poland) Ł Kubot	6	6
(Philippines) TC Huey (United Kingdom) D Inglot	7^{7}	6
5	(Belgium) X Malisse (Belgium) D Norman	6^{4}	4

Quarterfinals
1	(Sweden) R Lindstedt (Romania) H Tecău	6	6
(Slovakia) M Mertiňák (Brazil) A Sá	3	2
(Australia) P Hanley (Australia) J Kerr	7^{7}	4	[10]
(Croatia) I Dodig (Brazil) M Melo	6^{4}	6	[6]
(Germany) T Kamke (Germany) F Mayer	6	6^{2}	[9]
4	(United States) J Cerretani (Italy) F Fognini	3	7^{7}	[11]
(France) J Chardy (Poland) Ł Kubot	3	6	[10]
(Philippines) TC Huey (United Kingdom) D Inglot	6	3	[7]

Semifinals
1	(Sweden) R Lindstedt (Romania) H Tecău	5	6	[10]
(Australia) P Hanley (Australia) J Kerr	7	4	[8]
4	(United States) J Cerretani (Italy) F Fognini	3	2
(France) J Chardy (Poland) Ł Kubot	6	6

Final
1	(Sweden) R Lindstedt (Romania) H Tecău	7^{7}	6
(France) J Chardy (Poland) Ł Kubot	6^{2}	3
