= 2014 BRD Năstase Țiriac Trophy – Singles =

Singles
- 2014 BRD Năstase Țiriac Trophy

Final
- Champion: (Bulgaria) Grigor Dimitrov
- Runner-up: (Czech Republic) Lukáš Rosol
- Score: 7–6^{(7–2)}, 6–1

Details
- Draw: 28
- Seeds: 8

Events
Singles	Doubles
- BRD Năstase Țiriac Trophy

The 2014 BRD Năstase Țiriac Trophy - Singles was a session of the larger BRD Năstase Țiriac Trophy tennis tournament held at Arenele BNR in Bucharest, Romania, from 21 to 27 April 2014. Lukáš Rosol was the defending champion, but lost in the final to Grigor Dimitrov 7–6^{(7–2)}, 6–1

== Seeds ==
1. (Bulgaria) Grigor Dimitrov (champion)
2. (Russia) Mikhail Youzhny (second round)
3. (France) Gaël Monfils (semifinals, retired)
4. (France) Gilles Simon (quarterfinals)

5. (Canada) Vasek Pospisil (first round)
6. (Italy) Andreas Seppi (first round)
7. (France) Nicolas Mahut (first round)
8. (Finland) Jarkko Nieminen (second round)

== Draw ==
Key

- Q = Qualifier
- WC = Wild card
- LL = Lucky loser
- Alt = Alternate
- ITF = ITF entry
- PR = Protected ranking
- SR = Special ranking
- SE = Special exempt
- JE = Junior exempt
- JR = Junior Accelerator Programme entrant
- CO = College Accelerator Programme entrant
- NG = Next Gen Accelerator Program entrant
- w/o = Walkover
- r = Retired
- d = Defaulted

=== Finals ===
Semifinals
1/WC	(Bulgaria) Grigor Dimitrov	5
3	(France) Gaël Monfils	1^{r}
(Czech Republic) Lukáš Rosol	3	6	6
(Netherlands) Robin Haase	6	3	2

Final
1/WC	(Bulgaria) Grigor Dimitrov	7^{7}	6
(Czech Republic) Lukáš Rosol	6^{2}	1

=== Top half ===
First round
(France) J Chardy	6^{3}	0
(Czech Republic) J Veselý	7^{7}	6
(Ukraine) S Stakhovsky	2	6	6
WC	(Romania) P Ciorcilă	6	2	1
(Argentina) C Berlocq	6	2	7^{7}
6	(Italy) A Seppi	0	6	6^{4}
Q	(Georgia (country)) N Basilashvili	7^{7}	3	4
Q	(Lithuania) R Berankis	6^{2}	6	6
(France) A Mannarino	1	4
WC	(Romania) M Copil	6	6
Q	(France) P-H Mathieu	6	6
7	(France) N Mahut	3	1

Second round
1/WC	(Bulgaria) G Dimitrov	7^{7}	6
(Czech Republic) J Veselý	6^{5}	2
(Ukraine) S Stakhovsky	4	7^{7}	6
(Argentina) C Berlocq	6	6^{5}	2
3	(France) G Monfils	6	6
Q	(Lithuania) R Berankis	1	3
WC	(Romania) M Copil	3	2
Q	(France) P-H Mathieu	6	6

Quarterfinals
1/WC	(Bulgaria) G Dimitrov	6	6
(Ukraine) S Stakhovsky	3	4
3	(France) G Monfils	3	7^{10}	6
Q	(France) P-H Mathieu	6	6^{8}	2

Semifinals
1/WC	(Bulgaria) G Dimitrov	5
3	(France) G Monfils	1^{r}

=== Bottom half ===
First round
8	(Finland) J Nieminen	6	3	7^{7}
(Argentina) L Mayer	3	6	6^{4}
(Czech Republic) L Rosol	6	7^{8}
(Italy) F Volandri	1	6^{6}
(Israel) D Sela	3	4
(Romania) V Hănescu	6	6
5	(Canada) V Pospisil	7	2	1
Q	(Romania) A Ungur	5	6	6
(Uzbekistan) D Istomin	7^{8}	7^{8}
(Brazil) T Bellucci	6^{6}	6^{6}
(Australia) M Ebden	4	3
(Netherlands) R Haase	6	6

Second round
8	(Finland) J Nieminen	2	4
(Czech Republic) L Rosol	6	6
(Romania) V Hănescu	6	3	3
4	(France) G Simon	2	6	6
Q	(Romania) A Ungur	6	0	3
(Uzbekistan) D Istomin	4	6	6
(Netherlands) R Haase	6	6
2	(Russia) M Youzhny	3	3

Quarterfinals
(Czech Republic) L Rosol	7^{7}	6
4	(France) G Simon	6^{2}	2
(Uzbekistan) D Istomin	6	1	3
(Netherlands) R Haase	3	6	6

Semifinals
(Czech Republic) L Rosol	3	6	6
(Netherlands) R Haase	6	3	2

== Qualifying ==
=== Seeds ===
1. (Germany) Tobias Kamke (second round)
2. (Spain) Pere Riba (second round)
3. (France) Paul-Henri Mathieu (qualified)
4. (Romania) Adrian Ungur (qualified)
5. (Bosnia and Herzegovina) Damir Džumhur (first round)
6. (Lithuania) Ričardas Berankis (qualified)
7. (Moldova) Radu Albot (qualifying competition)
8. (Czech Republic) Jaroslav Pospíšil (qualifying competition)

=== Qualifiers ===
1. (Georgia (country)) Nikoloz Basilashvili
2. (Lithuania) Ričardas Berankis
3. (France) Paul-Henri Mathieu
4. (Romania) Adrian Ungur

=== Qualifying draw ===
==== First qualifier ====
First round
1	(Germany) Tobias Kamke	6	6
WC	(Romania) Petru-Alexandru Luncanu	3	2
(Croatia) Mate Pavić	4	4
(Georgia (country)) Nikoloz Basilashvili	6	6
(Moldova) Maxim Dubarenco	1	2
(Czech Republic) Roman Jebavý	6	6
(Switzerland) Henri Laaksonen	6	6
5	(Bosnia and Herzegovina) Damir Džumhur	4	1

Second round
1	(Germany) Tobias Kamke	5	4
(Georgia (country)) Nikoloz Basilashvili	7	6
(Czech Republic) Roman Jebavý	6^{1}	2
(Switzerland) Henri Laaksonen	7^{7}	6

Qualifying competition
(Georgia (country)) Nikoloz Basilashvili	6^{4}	6	6
(Switzerland) Henri Laaksonen	7^{7}	1	4

==== Second qualifier ====
First round
2	(Spain) Pere Riba	6	6
WC	(Romania) Andrei Pătrui	1	2
(Bosnia and Herzegovina) Mirza Bašić	7	4	6
(Romania) Victor Crivoi	5	6	4
(Bulgaria) Tihomir Grozdanov	4	1
(Russia) Alexey Vatutin	6	6
WC	(Romania) Andrei Ștefan Apostol	1	3
6	(Lithuania) Ričardas Berankis	6	6

Second round
2	(Spain) Pere Riba	4	3
(Bosnia and Herzegovina) Mirza Bašić	6	6
(Russia) Alexey Vatutin	5	2
6	(Lithuania) Ričardas Berankis	7	6

Qualifying competition
(Bosnia and Herzegovina) Mirza Bašić	7	4	2
6	(Lithuania) Ričardas Berankis	5	6	6

==== Third qualifier ====
First round
3	(France) Paul-Henri Mathieu	6	6
WC	(Romania) András Székely	1	2
(Belgium) Olivier Rochus	6	2	6
(Austria) Bastian Trinker	2	6	1
(Czech Republic) Jan Mertl	6	3	3
(Italy) Simone Vagnozzi	3	6	6
(Italy) Matteo Trevisan	4	6	2
7	(Moldova) Radu Albot	6	3	6

Second round
3	(France) Paul-Henri Mathieu	6	6
(Belgium) Olivier Rochus	1	4
(Italy) Simone Vagnozzi	3	5
7	(Moldova) Radu Albot	6	7

Qualifying competition
3	(France) Paul-Henri Mathieu	6	6
7	(Moldova) Radu Albot	3	1

==== Fourth qualifier ====
First round
4	(Romania) Adrian Ungur	6	4	6
(Germany) Matthias Bachinger	4	6	3
(Bosnia and Herzegovina) Aldin Šetkić	4	4
(Belarus) Egor Gerasimov	6	6
(Slovakia) Ivo Klec	4	0
(Austria) Michael Linzer	6	6
(Belgium) Niels Desein	5	7	4
8	(Czech Republic) Jaroslav Pospíšil	7	5	6

Second round
4	(Romania) Adrian Ungur	6	4	6
(Belarus) Egor Gerasimov	4	6	3
(Austria) Michael Linzer	2	0
8	(Czech Republic) Jaroslav Pospíšil	6	6

Qualifying competition
4	(Romania) Adrian Ungur	6	6
8	(Czech Republic) Jaroslav Pospíšil	4	4
