= 2012 BRD Năstase Țiriac Trophy =

- Date: 23–29 April
- Edition: 20th
- Category: ATP World Tour 250 Series
- Draw: 28S / 16D
- Prize money: $398,250
- Surface: Clay / outdoor
- Location: Bucharest, Romania

Champions

Singles
- (France) Gilles Simon

Doubles
- (Sweden) Robert Lindstedt / (Romania) Horia Tecău
- BRD Năstase Țiriac Trophy

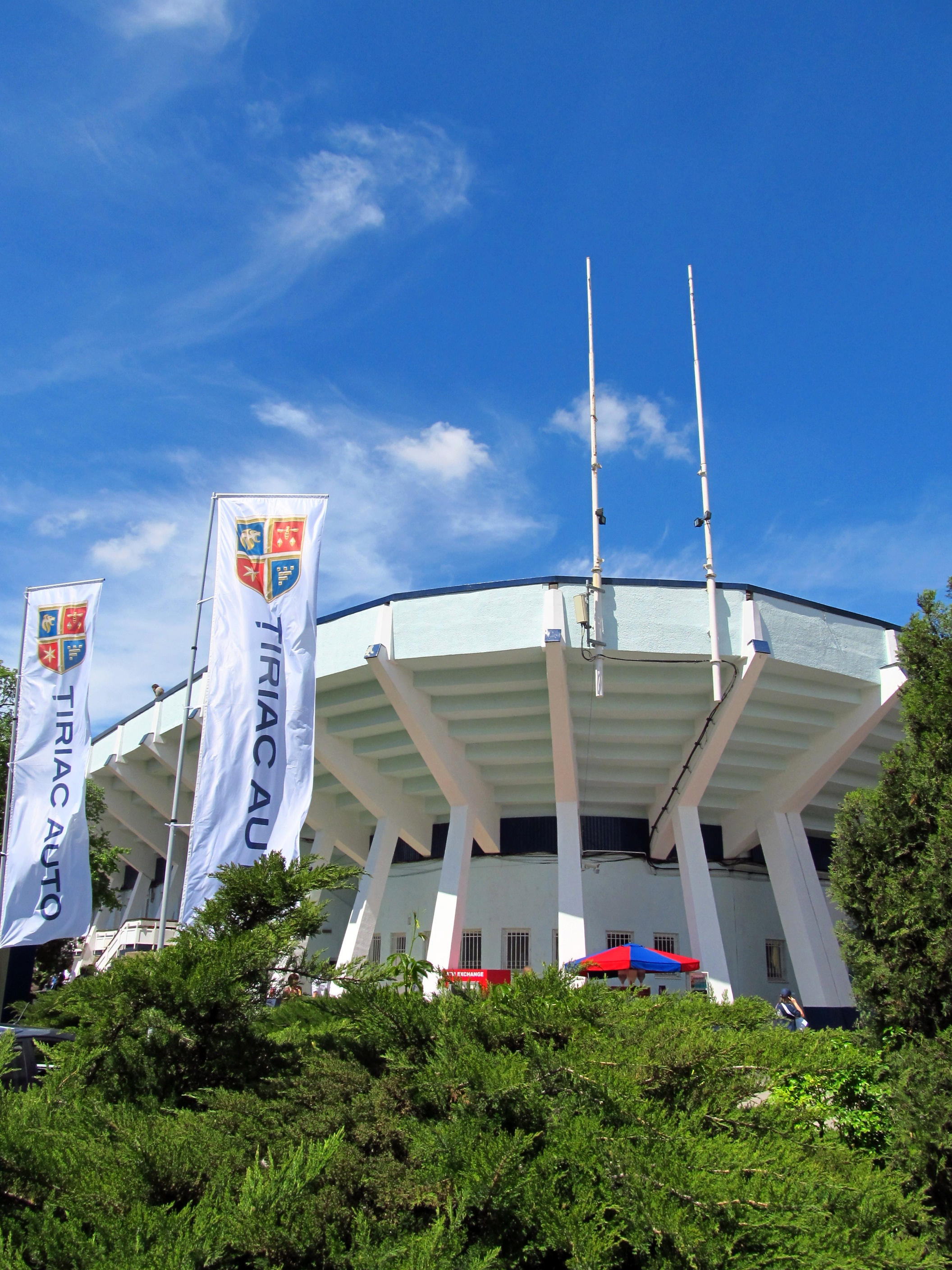
The main court at the 2012 BRD Năstase Țiriac Trophy seen from the outside

The 2012 BRD Năstase Țiriac Trophy was a tennis tournament played on outdoor clay courts. It was the 20th edition of the BRD Năstase Țiriac Trophy tournament, and was part of the ATP World Tour 250 Series of the 2012 ATP World Tour. It was held in Bucharest, Romania, 23 April until 29 April 2012. It was the first edition of the tournament to be played in spring after 19 years, when it was played in autumn. First-seeded Gilles Simon won the singles title.

== Singles main draw entrants ==
=== Seeds ===
Country	Player	Rank^{1}	Seed
FRA	Gilles Simon	15	1
GER	Florian Mayer	20	2
~~AUT~~	~~Jürgen Melzer~~	~~29~~	~~3~~
SRB	Viktor Troicki	30	4
CYP	Marcos Baghdatis	40	5
ITA	Andreas Seppi	44	6
POL	Łukasz Kubot	51	7
CRO	Ivan Dodig	57	8
FRA	Jérémy Chardy	59	9

- ^{1} Rankings are as of April 16, 2012

=== Other entrants ===
The following players received wildcards into the singles main draw:

- (Romania) Marius Copil
- (Romania) Victor Crivoi
- (Romania) Gabriel Moraru

The following players received entry from the qualifying draw:

- (Hungary) Attila Balázs
- (Germany) Daniel Brands
- (France) Guillaume Rufin
- (Estonia) Jürgen Zopp

The following players received entry as lucky loser:

- (Canada) Érik Chvojka

=== Withdrawals ===
The following players withdrew from the singles main draw:

- (France) Julien Benneteau (elbow fracture)
- (Austria) Jürgen Melzer (ankle injury)
- (Germany) Philipp Petzschner

== Doubles main draw entrants ==
=== Seeds ===
Country	Player	Country	Player	Rank^{1}	Seed
SWE	Robert Lindstedt	ROU	Horia Tecău	17	1
~~AUT~~	~~Julian Knowle~~	~~AUT~~	~~Jürgen Melzer~~	~~77~~	2
ITA	Daniele Bracciali	ITA	Potito Starace	83	3
USA	James Cerretani	ITA	Fabio Fognini	93	4
BEL	Xavier Malisse	BEL	Dick Norman	102	5

- Rankings are as of April 16, 2012

=== Other entrants ===
The following pairs received wildcards into the doubles main draw:

- (Romania) Marius Copil / (Germany) Alexander Waske
- (Romania) Andrei Dăescu / (Romania) Florin Mergea

The following pair received entry as alternates:

- (Germany) Martin Emmrich / (Sweden) Andreas Siljeström

=== Withdrawals ===
- (Austria) Jürgen Melzer (ankle injury)

== Finals ==
=== Singles ===
(France) Gilles Simon defeated (Italy) Fabio Fognini, 6–4, 6–3

- It was Simon's 1st title of the year and 10th of his career. It was his 3rd win in Bucharest, after 2007 and 2008.

=== Doubles ===
(Sweden) Robert Lindstedt / (Romania) Horia Tecău defeated (France) Jérémy Chardy / (Poland) Łukasz Kubot, 7–6^{(7–2)}, 6–3
