= Andrei Pătrui =

Romanian tennis player

- Country (sports): Romania
- Born: 1 July 1996 (age 29) Romania
- Height: 1.70 m (5 ft 7 in)
- Turned pro: 2013
- Plays: Right-handed (one-handed backhand)
- Prize money: $ 942

Singles
- Career record: 0
- Career titles: 0
- Highest ranking: 0
- Current ranking: 0

Grand Slam singles results
- Australian Open: -
- French Open: -
- Wimbledon: -
- US Open: -

Doubles
- Career record: 0
- Career titles: 0
- Highest ranking: No. 941 (9 September 2013)
- Current ranking: No. 978 (17 March 2014)
- Last updated on: 21 April 2014.

Andrei Pătrui (born 1 July 1996) is a Romanian tennis player.

His only appearance at World Tour level in doubles was with Victor Hănescu at the BRD Năstase Țiriac Trophy in Bucharest in April 2014. They lost their first-round match to Eric Butorac and Raven Klaasen. In 2017 Pătrui played his last tournament.
